= Hiromi Kojima =

Japanese footballer

Hiromi Kojima 小島 宏美
Personal information
- Full name: Hiromi Kojima
- Date of birth: December 12, 1977 (age 48)
- Place of birth: Nogata, Fukuoka, Japan
- Height: 1.77 m (5 ft 9 1/2 in)
- Positions: Midfielder; forward

Youth career
- 1993–1995: Higashi Fukuoka High School

Senior career*
Years	Team	Apps	(Gls)
1996–2001	Gamba Osaka	131	(36)
2002	Consadole Sapporo	5	(0)
2002	Omiya Ardija	11	(3)
2003	Oita Trinita	0	(0)
2003–2005	Vissel Kobe	38	(2)
2006–2008	FC Gifu	66	(16)
Total		251	(58)

International career
2000	Japan	1	(0)
- * Club domestic league appearances and goals

Hiromi Kojima (小島 宏美, Kojima Hiromi; born December 12, 1977) is a former Japanese football player. He played for Japan national team.

== Club career ==
Kojima was born in Nogata on December 12, 1977. After graduating from high school, he joined Gamba Osaka in 1996. He played many matches as forward from 1997. Around this time, many young players Tsuneyasu Miyamoto, Junichi Inamoto and Ryuji Bando got an opportunity to play in the club. However his opportunity to play decreased behind Kota Yoshihara in 2001. From 2002, he played for Consadole Sapporo (2002), Omiya Ardija (2002), Oita Trinita (2003) and Vissel Kobe (2003-05). At Vissel Kobe, he was converted to mainly defensive midfielder in 2004. He moved to Regional Leagues club FC Gifu in 2006. He retired end of 2008 season.

== National team career ==
On April 26, 2000, Kojima debuted for Japan national team against South Korea.

== Club statistics ==
Club performance			League		Cup		League Cup		Total	
Season	Club	League	Apps	Goals	Apps	Goals	Apps	Goals	Apps	Goals
Japan			League		Emperor's Cup		J.League Cup		Total	
1996	Gamba Osaka	J1 League	9	1	3	1	2	0	14	2
1997	Gamba Osaka	J1 League	20	1	3	0	6	1	29	2
1998	Gamba Osaka	J1 League	34	17	1	0	4	3	39	20
1999	Gamba Osaka	J1 League	21	6	2	2	3	1	26	9
2000	Gamba Osaka	J1 League	30	9	4	2	3	0	37	11
2001	Gamba Osaka	J1 League	17	2	3	0	2	0	22	2
2002	Consadole Sapporo	J1 League	5	0	0	0	2	1	7	1
2002	Omiya Ardija	J2 League	11	3	0	0	-		11	3
2003	Oita Trinita	J1 League	0	0	0	0	1	0	1	0
2003	Vissel Kobe	J1 League	6	0	3	1	1	0	10	1
2004	Vissel Kobe	J1 League	21	2	0	0	5	0	26	2
2005	Vissel Kobe	J1 League	11	0	1	0	0	0	12	0
2006	FC Gifu	JRL (Tōkai, Div. 1)	11	6	3	2	-		14	8
2007	FC Gifu	JFL	28	7	3	0	-		31	7
2008	FC Gifu	J2 League	27	2	2	0	-		29	2
Total			251	56	28	8	29	6	308	70

== National team statistics ==
Japan national team
Year	Apps	Goals
2000	1	0
Total	1	0
