= 1998 Gamba Osaka season =

Gamba Osaka
1998 season
- Manager: Koncilia; Antonetti
- Stadium: Osaka Expo '70 Stadium
- J.League: 15th
- Emperor's Cup: 3rd Round
- J.League Cup: GL-C 3rd
- Top goalscorer: Hiromi Kojima (17)
Home colours	Away colours

1998 Gamba Osaka season

== Competitions ==
Competitions	Position
J.League	15th / 18 clubs
Emperor's Cup	3rd round
J.League Cup	GL-C 3rd / 5 clubs

== Domestic results ==
=== J.League ===
21 March 1998 1-1	Gamba Osaka	1-2	Cerezo Osaka	Osaka Expo '70 Stadium
JST (UTC+09)

25 March 1998 1-2	Sanfrecce Hiroshima	0-1 (GG) (a.e.t.)	Gamba Osaka	Hiroshima Stadium
JST (UTC+09)

28 March 1998 1-3	Gamba Osaka	3-2	Avispa Fukuoka	Osaka Expo '70 Stadium
JST (UTC+09)

4 April 1998 1-4	Consadole Sapporo	1-0	Gamba Osaka	Muroran Irie Stadium
JST (UTC+09)

11 April 1998 1-5	Gamba Osaka	1-2	Shimizu S-Pulse	Osaka Expo '70 Stadium
JST (UTC+09)

15 April 1998 1-6	Kashima Antlers	1-0	Gamba Osaka	Kashima Soccer Stadium
JST (UTC+09)

18 April 1998 1-7	Gamba Osaka	3-1	Kashiwa Reysol	Osaka Expo '70 Stadium
JST (UTC+09)

25 April 1998 1-8	Gamba Osaka	0-1	Kyoto Purple Sanga	Osaka Expo '70 Stadium
JST (UTC+09)

29 April 1998 1-9	Yokohama Marinos	2-1	Gamba Osaka	International Stadium Yokohama
JST (UTC+09)

2 May 1998 1-10	Gamba Osaka	0-2	Urawa Red Diamonds	Osaka Expo '70 Stadium
JST (UTC+09)

5 May 1998 1-11	Nagoya Grampus Eight	0-0	Gamba Osaka	Gifu Nagaragawa Stadium
JST (UTC+09)

9 May 1998 1-12	Gamba Osaka	1-2 (GG) (a.e.t.)	Bellmare Hiratsuka	Osaka Expo '70 Stadium
JST (UTC+09)

25 July 1998 1-13	Júbilo Iwata	4-1	Gamba Osaka	Júbilo Iwata Stadium
JST (UTC+09)

29 July 1998 1-14	Gamba Osaka	2-4	Verdy Kawasaki	Ishikawa Kanazawa Stadium
JST (UTC+09)

1 August 1998 1-15	Vissel Kobe	0-4	Gamba Osaka	Kobe Universiade Memorial Stadium
JST (UTC+09)

5 August 1998 1-16	JEF United Ichihara	3-2 (GG) (a.e.t.)	Gamba Osaka	Ichihara Seaside Stadium
JST (UTC+09)

8 August 1998 1-17	Yokohama Flügels	3-6	Gamba Osaka	Yokohama Mitsuzawa Stadium
JST (UTC+09)

22 August 1998 2-1	Verdy Kawasaki	1-2	Gamba Osaka	Todoroki Athletics Stadium
JST (UTC+09)

29 August 1998 2-2	Gamba Osaka	1-0 (GG) (a.e.t.)	Vissel Kobe	Osaka Expo '70 Stadium
JST (UTC+09)

5 September 1998 2-3	JEF United Ichihara	0-1 (GG) (a.e.t.)	Gamba Osaka	Ichihara Seaside Stadium
JST (UTC+09)

12 September 1998 2-4	Gamba Osaka	1-1 (GG) (a.e.t.) (1-4 p)	Yokohama Flügels	Osaka Expo '70 Stadium
JST (UTC+09)

15 September 1998 2-5	Cerezo Osaka	2-1	Gamba Osaka	Osaka Nagai Stadium
JST (UTC+09)

19 September 1998 2-6	Gamba Osaka	0-2	Sanfrecce Hiroshima	Osaka Expo '70 Stadium
JST (UTC+09)

23 September 1998 2-7	Avispa Fukuoka	1-0	Gamba Osaka	Hakatanomori Football Stadium
JST (UTC+09)

26 September 1998 2-8	Gamba Osaka	1-0	Consadole Sapporo	Osaka Expo '70 Stadium
JST (UTC+09)

3 October 1998 2-9	Shimizu S-Pulse	4-1	Gamba Osaka	Nihondaira Sports Stadium
JST (UTC+09)

14 October 1998 2-10	Gamba Osaka	1-3	Kashima Antlers	Osaka Expo '70 Stadium
JST (UTC+09)

17 October 1998 2-11	Kashiwa Reysol	2-0	Gamba Osaka	Hitachi Kashiwa Soccer Stadium
JST (UTC+09)

21 October 1998 2-12	Kyoto Purple Sanga	1-3	Gamba Osaka	Nishikyogoku Athletic Stadium
JST (UTC+09)

24 October 1998 2-13	Gamba Osaka	1-4	Yokohama Marinos	Osaka Expo '70 Stadium
JST (UTC+09)

31 October 1998 2-14	Urawa Red Diamonds	1-0	Gamba Osaka	Urawa Komaba Stadium
JST (UTC+09)

3 November 1998 2-15	Gamba Osaka	2-3	Nagoya Grampus Eight	Osaka Expo '70 Stadium
JST (UTC+09)

7 November 1998 2-16	Bellmare Hiratsuka	2-1	Gamba Osaka	Hiratsuka Athletics Stadium
JST (UTC+09)

14 November 1998 2-17	Gamba Osaka	4-5	Júbilo Iwata	Osaka Expo '70 Stadium
JST (UTC+09)

=== Emperor's Cup ===
1st Round	bye

2nd Round	bye

13 December 1998 3rd Round	Gamba Osaka	1-2	Montedio Yamagata	Osaka Expo '70 Stadium
JST (UTC+09)

=== J.League Cup ===
16 May 1998 GL-C-1	Yokohama Flügels	0-2	Gamba Osaka	Yokohama Mitsuzawa Stadium
JST (UTC+09)

23 May 1998 GL-C-2	Gamba Osaka	5-2	Consadole Sapporo	Osaka Expo '70 Stadium
JST (UTC+09)

30 May 1998 GL-C-3	Gamba Osaka	0-2	Kawasaki Frontale	Osaka Expo '70 Stadium
JST (UTC+09)

3 June 1998 GL-C-4	Shimizu S-Pulse	2-0	Gamba Osaka	Nihondaira Sports Stadium
JST (UTC+09)

GL-C-5	bye

== Player statistics ==
No.	Pos.	Nat.	Player	D.o.B. (Age)	Height / Weight	J.League		Emperor's Cup		J.League Cup		Total	
No.	Pos.	Nat.	Player	D.o.B. (Age)	Height / Weight	Apps	Goals	Apps	Goals	Apps	Goals	Apps	Goals
1	GK	(Japan)	Hayato Okanaka	September 26, 1968 (aged 29)	cm / kg	33	0						
2	DF	(Japan)	Kenichiro Tokura	May 31, 1971 (aged 26)	cm / kg	5	0						
3	DF	(Japan)	Daisuke Saito	November 19, 1974 (aged 23)	cm / kg	18	0						
4	DF	(Japan)	Noritada Saneyoshi	October 19, 1972 (aged 25)	cm / kg	34	0						
5	DF	(North Macedonia)	Boban Babunski	May 5, 1968 (aged 29)	cm / kg	1	0						
5	DF	(France)	Claude Dambury	July 30, 1971 (aged 26)	cm / kg	22	2						
6	MF	(Japan)	Junichi Inamoto	September 18, 1979 (aged 18)	cm / kg	28	6						
7	DF	(Japan)	Naoki Hiraoka	May 24, 1973 (aged 24)	cm / kg	26	1						
8	MF	(Japan)	Koji Kondo	April 28, 1972 (aged 25)	cm / kg	0	0						
9	FW	(Cameroon)	Patrick M'Boma	November 15, 1970 (aged 27)	cm / kg	6	4						
9	FW	(Serbia and Montenegro)	Anto Drobnjak	September 21, 1968 (aged 29)	cm / kg	18	8						
10	MF	(Serbia and Montenegro)	Nebojša Krupniković	August 15, 1973 (aged 24)	cm / kg	13	2						
11	FW	(Japan)	Masanobu Matsunami	November 21, 1974 (aged 23)	cm / kg	25	1						
12	GK	(Japan)	Ryōta Tsuzuki	April 18, 1978 (aged 19)	cm / kg	1	0						
13	MF	(Japan)	Hiromi Kojima	December 12, 1977 (aged 20)	cm / kg	34	17						
14	MF	(Japan)	Shigeru Morioka	August 12, 1973 (aged 24)	cm / kg	13	0						
15	DF	(Japan)	Masao Kiba	September 6, 1974 (aged 23)	cm / kg	21	0						
16	DF	(Japan)	Daiju Matsumoto	December 9, 1977 (aged 20)	cm / kg	7	0						
17	DF	(Japan)	Toru Araiba	July 12, 1979 (aged 18)	cm / kg	30	0						
18	FW	(Japan)	Yuzo Funakoshi	June 12, 1977 (aged 20)	cm / kg	1	0						
19	DF	(Japan)	Kojiro Kaimoto	October 14, 1977 (aged 20)	cm / kg	13	0						
20	DF	(Japan)	Tsuneyasu Miyamoto	February 7, 1977 (aged 21)	cm / kg	32	0						
21	MF	(Japan)	Hitoshi Morishita	September 21, 1972 (aged 25)	cm / kg	27	1						
22	GK	(Japan)	Naoki Matsuyo	April 9, 1974 (aged 23)	cm / kg	0	0						
23	MF	(Japan)	Yuji Hironaga	July 25, 1975 (aged 22)	cm / kg	26	3						
24	MF	(Japan)	Eiji Hanayama	August 21, 1977 (aged 20)	cm / kg	1	0						
25	FW	(Japan)	Kohei Hayashi	June 27, 1978 (aged 19)	cm / kg	7	0						
26	DF	(Japan)	Yuji Furukawa	July 7, 1978 (aged 19)	cm / kg	0	0						
27	FW	(Japan)	Shingi Ono	April 9, 1974 (aged 23)	cm / kg	6	0						
28	DF	(Japan)	Josuke Sato	November 19, 1975 (aged 22)	cm / kg	0	0						
29	FW	(Japan)	Ryūji Bando	August 2, 1979 (aged 18)	cm / kg	13	0						
30	MF	(Slovenia)	Amir Karić	December 31, 1973 (aged 24)	cm / kg	7	0						
31	MF	(Japan)	Hideo Hashimoto	May 21, 1979 (aged 18)	cm / kg	0	0						

== Other pages ==
- (in Japanese) J.League official site
