= 1997 Gamba Osaka season =

Gamba Osaka
1997 season
- Manager: Kuže; Koncilia
- Stadium: Osaka Expo '70 Stadium
- J.League: 4th
- Emperor's Cup: Quarterfinals
- J.League Cup: GL-B 3rd
- Top goalscorer: Mboma (25)
Home colours	Away colours

1997 Gamba Osaka season

== Competitions ==
Competitions	Position
J.League	4th / 17 clubs
Emperor's Cup	Quarterfinals
J.League Cup	GL-B 3rd / 4 clubs

== Domestic results ==
=== J.League ===
12 April 1997 1-1	Gamba Osaka	4-1	Bellmare Hiratsuka	Osaka Expo '70 Stadium
JST (UTC+09)

16 April 1997 1-2	Yokohama Marinos	0-4	Gamba Osaka	Yokohama Mitsuzawa Stadium
JST (UTC+09)

19 April 1997 1-3	Gamba Osaka	4-1	Shimizu S-Pulse	Osaka Expo '70 Stadium
JST (UTC+09)

23 April 1997 1-4	Sanfrecce Hiroshima	2-0	Gamba Osaka	Hiroshima Big Arch
JST (UTC+09)

26 April 1997 1-5	Gamba Osaka	0-1	Avispa Fukuoka	Osaka Expo '70 Stadium
JST (UTC+09)

3 May 1997 1-6	Cerezo Osaka	0-2	Gamba Osaka	Osaka Nagai Stadium
JST (UTC+09)

7 May 1997 1-7	Gamba Osaka	2-3	Vissel Kobe	Osaka Expo '70 Stadium
JST (UTC+09)

10 May 1997 1-8	Kashima Antlers	1-2	Gamba Osaka	Kashima Soccer Stadium
JST (UTC+09)

17 May 1997 1-9	Gamba Osaka	0-1	Nagoya Grampus Eight	Osaka Expo '70 Stadium
JST (UTC+09)

24 May 1997 1-10	Yokohama Flügels	2-1	Gamba Osaka	Toyama Athletic Stadium
JST (UTC+09)

28 May 1997 1-11	Gamba Osaka	3-1	Júbilo Iwata	Osaka Expo '70 Stadium
JST (UTC+09)

31 May 1997 1-12	Kashiwa Reysol	4-1	Gamba Osaka	Hitachi Kashiwa Soccer Stadium
JST (UTC+09)

5 July 1997 1-13	Gamba Osaka	1-2	Urawa Red Diamonds	Osaka Expo '70 Stadium
JST (UTC+09)

1-14	bye

12 July 1997 1-15	Verdy Kawasaki	0-1	Gamba Osaka	Todoroki Athletics Stadium
JST (UTC+09)

16 July 1997 1-16	Gamba Osaka	0-3	Kyoto Purple Sanga	Osaka Expo '70 Stadium
JST (UTC+09)

19 July 1997 1-17	JEF United Ichihara	1-3	Gamba Osaka	Ichihara Seaside Stadium
JST (UTC+09)

30 July 1997 2-1	Kyoto Purple Sanga	3-2	Gamba Osaka	Tottori Soccer Stadium
JST (UTC+09)

2 August 1997 2-2	Bellmare Hiratsuka	3-4	Gamba Osaka	Hiratsuka Athletics Stadium
JST (UTC+09)

6 August 1997 2-3	Gamba Osaka	3-4	Yokohama Marinos	Ishikawa Kanazawa Stadium
JST (UTC+09)

9 August 1997 2-4	Shimizu S-Pulse	1-2	Gamba Osaka	Nihondaira Sports Stadium
JST (UTC+09)

16 August 1997 2-5	Gamba Osaka	3-0	Sanfrecce Hiroshima	Osaka Expo '70 Stadium
JST (UTC+09)

20 August 1997 2-6	Avispa Fukuoka	0-1	Gamba Osaka	Suizenji Stadium
JST (UTC+09)

23 August 1997 2-7	Gamba Osaka	3-2 (GG) (a.e.t.)	Cerezo Osaka	Osaka Expo '70 Stadium
JST (UTC+09)

30 August 1997 2-8	Vissel Kobe	0-4	Gamba Osaka	Kobe Universiade Memorial Stadium
JST (UTC+09)

3 September 1997 2-9	Gamba Osaka	2-1 (GG) (a.e.t.)	Kashima Antlers	Osaka Expo '70 Stadium
JST (UTC+09)

6 September 1997 2-10	Nagoya Grampus Eight	0-1	Gamba Osaka	Mizuho Athletic Stadium
JST (UTC+09)

10 September 1997 2-11	Gamba Osaka	2-1	Verdy Kawasaki	Osaka Expo '70 Stadium
JST (UTC+09)

13 September 1997 2-12	Gamba Osaka	2-1	Yokohama Flügels	Osaka Expo '70 Stadium
JST (UTC+09)

20 September 1997 2-13	Gamba Osaka	1-2	Kashiwa Reysol	Osaka Expo '70 Stadium
JST (UTC+09)

24 September 1997 2-14	Júbilo Iwata	1-0 (GG) (a.e.t.)	Gamba Osaka	Júbilo Iwata Stadium
JST (UTC+09)

27 September 1997 2-15	Urawa Red Diamonds	1-4	Gamba Osaka	Tokyo National Stadium
JST (UTC+09)

2-16	bye

4 October 1997 2-17	Gamba Osaka	4-3	JEF United Ichihara	Osaka Expo '70 Stadium
JST (UTC+09)

=== Emperor's Cup ===
1st Round	bye

2nd Round	bye

14 December 1997 3rd Round	Gamba Osaka	3-2 (GG) (a.e.t.)	Sagan Tosu	Osaka Expo '70 Stadium
JST (UTC+09)

20 December 1997 4th Round	Urawa Red Diamonds	1-2 (GG) (a.e.t.)	Gamba Osaka	Tottori Soccer Stadium
JST (UTC+09)

23 December 1997 Quarterfinals	Kashima Antlers	3-0	Gamba Osaka	Urawa Komaba Stadium
JST (UTC+09)

=== J.League Cup ===
8 March 1997 GL-B-1	Gamba Osaka	3-3	Consadole Sapporo	Osaka Expo '70 Stadium
JST (UTC+09)

15 March 1997 GL-B-2	Yokohama Marinos	3-4	Gamba Osaka	Yokohama Mitsuzawa Stadium
JST (UTC+09)

19 March 1997 GL-B-3	Verdy Kawasaki	1-2	Gamba Osaka	Todoroki Athletics Stadium
JST (UTC+09)

22 March 1997 GL-B-4	Gamba Osaka	1-2	Yokohama Marinos	Osaka Expo '70 Stadium
JST (UTC+09)

26 March 1997 GL-B-5	Gamba Osaka	0-1	Verdy Kawasaki	Osaka Expo '70 Stadium
JST (UTC+09)

29 March 1997 GL-B-6	Consadole Sapporo	1-0	Gamba Osaka	Suizenji Stadium
JST (UTC+09)

== Player statistics ==
No.	Pos.	Nat.	Player	D.o.B. (Age)	Height / Weight	J.League		Emperor's Cup		J.League Cup		Total	
No.	Pos.	Nat.	Player	D.o.B. (Age)	Height / Weight	Apps	Goals	Apps	Goals	Apps	Goals	Apps	Goals
1	GK	(Japan)	Hayato Okanaka	September 26, 1968 (aged 28)	185 cm / 83 kg	32	0	3	0	4	0	39	0
2	MF	(Japan)	Koji Yoshinari	May 19, 1974 (aged 22)	174 cm / 70 kg	1	0	0	0	0	0	1	0
3	DF	(Japan)	Daisuke Saito	November 19, 1974 (aged 22)	181 cm / 73 kg	31	0	3	0	3	0	37	0
4	DF	(Japan)	Noritada Saneyoshi	October 19, 1972 (aged 24)	178 cm / 70 kg	30	0	3	0	5	0	38	0
5	DF	(North Macedonia)	Babunski	May 5, 1968 (aged 28)	184 cm / 78 kg	23	5	2	1	5	1	30	7
6	MF	(Japan)	Hitoshi Morishita	September 21, 1972 (aged 24)	174 cm / 70 kg	29	2	1	0	5	0	35	2
7	MF	(Japan)	Naoki Hiraoka	May 24, 1973 (aged 23)	171 cm / 68 kg	28	1	3	2	6	1	37	4
8	MF	(Japan)	Koji Kondo	April 28, 1972 (aged 24)	175 cm / 67 kg	0	0		0	0	0		0
9	FW	(Cameroon)	Mboma	November 15, 1970 (aged 26)	185 cm / 85 kg	28	25	1	0	5	4	34	29
10	MF	(Serbia and Montenegro)	Krupni	August 15, 1973 (aged 23)	184 cm / 79 kg	27	9	3	1	6	2	36	12
11	FW	(Japan)	Masanobu Matsunami	November 21, 1974 (aged 22)	180 cm / 75 kg	32	13	3	0	6	1	41	14
12	GK	(Japan)	Kenji Honnami	June 23, 1964 (aged 32)	186 cm / 80 kg	0	0	0	0	2	0	2	0
13	MF	(Japan)	Hiromi Kojima	December 12, 1977 (aged 19)	176 cm / 66 kg	20	1	3	0	6	1	29	2
14	MF	(Japan)	Shigeru Morioka	August 12, 1973 (aged 23)	174 cm / 70 kg	28	5	1	0	0	0	29	5
15	DF	(Japan)	Masao Kiba	September 6, 1974 (aged 22)	177 cm / 73 kg	9	0	3	0	5	0	17	0
16	DF	(Japan)	Daiju Matsumoto	December 9, 1977 (aged 19)	178 cm / 70 kg	6	0	1	0	0	0	7	0
17	DF	(Japan)	Takashi Kiyama	February 18, 1972 (aged 25)	180 cm / 75 kg	10	0	0	0	5	0	15	0
18	MF	(Croatia)	Mladenović	September 13, 1964 (aged 32)	178 cm / 73 kg	0	0	0	0	0	0	0	0
19	DF	(Japan)	Kojiro Kaimoto	October 14, 1977 (aged 19)	182 cm / 72 kg	11	1	0	0	2	0	13	1
20	DF	(Japan)	Tsuneyasu Miyamoto	February 7, 1977 (aged 20)	176 cm / 71 kg	26	1	3	0	4	0	33	1
21	GK	(Japan)	Naoki Matsuyo	April 9, 1974 (aged 22)	180 cm / 72 kg	0	0		0	0	0		0
22	GK	(Japan)	Hiroyuki Kishi	April 26, 1977 (aged 19)	188 cm / 84 kg	0	0		0	0	0		0
23	GK	(Japan)	Ryota Tsuzuki	April 18, 1978 (aged 18)	185 cm / 78 kg	0	0	0	0	0	0	0	0
24	MF	(Japan)	Tadayoshi Tamura	August 16, 1978 (aged 18)	183 cm / 73 kg	0	0		0	0	0		0
25	FW	(Japan)	Kohei Hayashi	June 27, 1978 (aged 18)	175 cm / 70 kg	1	0	0	0	0	0	1	0
26	DF	(Japan)	Yuji Furukawa	July 7, 1978 (aged 18)	181 cm / 76 kg	0	0		0	0	0		0
27	DF	(Japan)	Takahiro Shimada	February 9, 1965 (aged 32)	182 cm / 78 kg	15	0	1	0	6	0	22	0
28	MF	(Japan)	Hideki Nomiyama	April 28, 1975 (aged 21)	181 cm / 65 kg	2	0	0	0	2	0	4	0
29	MF	(Japan)	Junichi Inamoto †	September 18, 1979 (aged 17)	-cm / -kg	27	3	3	0	6	0	36	3
30	DF	(Japan)	Toshimi Kikuchi †	June 17, 1973 (aged 23)	177 cm / 70 kg	13	0	0	0	0	0	13	0
18	FW	(Japan)	Yuzo Funakoshi †	June 12, 1977 (aged 19)	-cm / -kg	2	0	3	1	0	0	5	1
31	DF	(Japan)	Toru Araiba †	July 12, 1979 (aged 17)	-cm / -kg	2	0	0	0	0	0	2	0
31	MF	(Slovenia)	Karić †	December 31, 1973 (aged 23)	-cm / -kg	5	0	2	0	0	0	7	0

- † player(s) joined the team after the opening of this season.

== Transfers ==
In:

No.	Pos.	Nation	Player
21	GK	JPN	Naoki Matsuyo (from Tenri University)
23	GK	JPN	Ryota Tsuzuki (from Kunimi High School)
3	DF	JPN	Daisuke Saito (from Chuo University)
26	DF	JPN	Yuji Furukawa (from Ashiya High School)
2	MF	JPN	Koji Yoshinari (from University of Tsukuba)
10	MF	SCG	Nebojša Krupniković (from Standard Liège)
24	MF	JPN	Tadayoshi Tamura (from Kusatsu Higashi High School)
9	FW	CMR	Patrick Mboma (from Paris SG)
25	FW	JPN	Kohei Hayashi (from Takigawa Daini Seinior High School)

Out:

No.	Pos.	Nation	Player
—	GK	JPN	Atsushi Shirai (to JEF United Ichihara)
—	DF	UKR	Tsveiba
—	DF	JPN	Takeshi Yonezawa
—	DF	JPN	Yuji Hashimoto (to Sagan Tosu)
—	DF	JPN	Keiju Karashima (to Avispa Fukuoka)
—	DF	JPN	Takehiro Kato
—	MF	BLR	Aleinikov
—	MF	JPN	Yoshiyuki Matsuyama (to Kyoto Purple Sanga)
—	MF	JPN	Kunio Kitamura (to Nippon Denso)
—	MF	JPN	Hiromitsu Isogai (to Urawa Red Diamonds)
—	MF	CRO	Škrinjar
—	MF	JPN	Sojiro Ishii (to Nippon Denso)
—	MF	JPN	Masafumi Nakaguchi
—	MF	JPN	Hideki Yoshioka
—	MF	JPN	Kenji Takagi
—	FW	NED	Gillhaus (to AZ)
—	FW	JPN	Hiroto Yamamura
—	FW	JPN	Kensuke Nishijima

== Transfers during the season ==
=== In ===
- (Japan) Junichi Inamoto (Gamba Osaka youth)
- (Japan) Toshimi Kikuchi (from Verdy Kawasaki)
- (Japan) Yuzo Funakoshi (loan return from Telstar on June)
- (Japan) Toru Araiba (Gamba Osaka youth)
- (Slovenia) Karić (from Maribor on August)

=== Out ===
- (Japan) Kenji Honnami (to Verdy Kawasaki)
- (Croatia) Mladen Mladenović (on June)

== Awards ==
- J.League Top Scorer: (Cameroon) Mboma
- J.League Best XI: (Cameroon) Mboma

== Other pages ==
- (in Japanese) J. League official site
- (in Japanese) Gamba Osaka official site
