= 2001 Gamba Osaka season =

Gamba Osaka
2001 season
- Manager: Hiroshi Hayano; Kazuhiko Takemoto
- Stadium: Osaka Expo '70 Stadium
- J.League 1: 7th
- Emperor's Cup: Quarterfinals
- J.League Cup: 2nd Round
- Top goalscorer: Nino Bule (17)
Home colours	Away colours

2001 Gamba Osaka season

== Competitions ==
Competitions	Position
J.League 1	7th / 16 clubs
Emperor's Cup	Quarterfinals
J.League Cup	2nd round

== Domestic results ==
=== J.League 1 ===
10 March 2001 1-1	Avispa Fukuoka	2-0	Gamba Osaka	Hakatanomori Football Stadium
JST (UTC+09)

17 March 2001 1-2	Gamba Osaka	3-2	Yokohama F. Marinos	Osaka Expo '70 Stadium
JST (UTC+09)

31 March 2001 1-3	Vissel Kobe	0-1 (GG) (a.e.t.)	Gamba Osaka	Kobe Universiade Memorial Stadium
JST (UTC+09)

7 April 2001 1-4	Gamba Osaka	2-1	Cerezo Osaka	Osaka Expo '70 Stadium
JST (UTC+09)

14 April 2001 1-5	Gamba Osaka	0-1 (GG) (a.e.t.)	Shimizu S-Pulse	Osaka Expo '70 Stadium
JST (UTC+09)

29 April 2001 1-6	Consadole Sapporo	1-0	Gamba Osaka	Hakodate Chiyogadai Stadium
JST (UTC+09)

3 May 2001 1-7	Gamba Osaka	3-2 (GG) (a.e.t.)	Kashiwa Reysol	Osaka Expo '70 Stadium
JST (UTC+09)

6 May 2001 1-8	Júbilo Iwata	2-0	Gamba Osaka	Júbilo Iwata Stadium
JST (UTC+09)

12 May 2001 1-9	Gamba Osaka	2-3 (GG) (a.e.t.)	Nagoya Grampus Eight	Osaka Expo '70 Stadium
JST (UTC+09)

19 May 2001 1-10	Urawa Red Diamonds	1-2	Gamba Osaka	Urawa Komaba Stadium
JST (UTC+09)

16 June 2001 1-11	Gamba Osaka	3-4 (GG) (a.e.t.)	JEF United Ichihara	Osaka Expo '70 Stadium
JST (UTC+09)

23 June 2001 1-12	Sanfrecce Hiroshima	2-3	Gamba Osaka	Hiroshima Big Arch
JST (UTC+09)

7 July 2001 1-13	Gamba Osaka	5-0	Tokyo Verdy 1969	Osaka Expo '70 Stadium
JST (UTC+09)

14 July 2001 1-14	FC Tokyo	0-2	Gamba Osaka	Tokyo Stadium
JST (UTC+09)

21 July 2001 1-15	Gamba Osaka	3-1	Kashima Antlers	Osaka Expo '70 Stadium
JST (UTC+09)

11 August 2001 2-1	Nagoya Grampus Eight	3-2	Gamba Osaka	Mizuho Athletic Stadium
JST (UTC+09)

18 August 2001 2-2	Gamba Osaka	1-0	Júbilo Iwata	Osaka Expo '70 Stadium
JST (UTC+09)

25 August 2001 2-3	Kashima Antlers	3-1	Gamba Osaka	Kashima Soccer Stadium
JST (UTC+09)

8 September 2001 2-4	Gamba Osaka	1-2	FC Tokyo	Osaka Expo '70 Stadium
JST (UTC+09)

15 September 2001 2-5	Kashiwa Reysol	0-1	Gamba Osaka	Hitachi Kashiwa Soccer Stadium
JST (UTC+09)

22 September 2001 2-6	Gamba Osaka	0-0 (GG) (a.e.t.)	Consadole Sapporo	Osaka Expo '70 Stadium
JST (UTC+09)

29 September 2001 2-7	Shimizu S-Pulse	4-2	Gamba Osaka	Nihondaira Sports Stadium
JST (UTC+09)

13 October 2001 2-8	Cerezo Osaka	2-1 (GG) (a.e.t.)	Gamba Osaka	Osaka Nagai Stadium
JST (UTC+09)

17 October 2001 2-9	Gamba Osaka	3-2	Vissel Kobe	Osaka Expo '70 Stadium
JST (UTC+09)

20 October 2001 2-10	Gamba Osaka	1-1 (GG) (a.e.t.)	Urawa Red Diamonds	Osaka Expo '70 Stadium
JST (UTC+09)

31 October 2001 2-11	JEF United Ichihara	0-1	Gamba Osaka	Ichihara Seaside Stadium
JST (UTC+09)

3 November 2001 2-12	Gamba Osaka	1-2	Sanfrecce Hiroshima	Ishikawa Kanazawa Stadium
JST (UTC+09)

10 November 2001 2-13	Tokyo Verdy 1969	3-2	Gamba Osaka	Tokyo Stadium
JST (UTC+09)

17 November 2001 2-14	Yokohama F. Marinos	2-1	Gamba Osaka	Yokohama Mitsuzawa Stadium
JST (UTC+09)

24 November 2001 2-15	Gamba Osaka	3-2	Avispa Fukuoka	Osaka Expo '70 Stadium
JST (UTC+09)

=== Emperor's Cup ===
1st Round	bye

2nd Round	bye

9 December 2001 3rd Round	Gamba Osaka	5-0	Mito HollyHock	Osaka Expo '70 Stadium
JST (UTC+09)

16 December 2001 4th Round	Gamba Osaka	1-0	Albirex Niigata	Tottori Soccer Stadium
JST (UTC+09)

24 December 2001 Quarterfinals	Gamba Osaka	0-2	Shimizu S-Pulse	Kagawa Marugame Stadium
JST (UTC+09)

=== J.League Cup ===
4 April 2001 1st Round-1	Kyoto Purple Sanga	0-2	Gamba Osaka	Nishikyogoku Athletic Stadium
JST (UTC+09)

18 April 2001 1st Round-2	Gamba Osaka	2-0 (4-0 agg.)	Kyoto Purple Sanga	Osaka Expo '70 Stadium
JST (UTC+09)

13 June 2001 2nd Round-1	Gamba Osaka	1-3	Urawa Red Diamonds	Osaka Expo '70 Stadium
JST (UTC+09)

20 June 2001 2nd Round-2	Urawa Red Diamonds	3-2 (6-3 agg.)	Gamba Osaka	Urawa Komaba Stadium
JST (UTC+09)

== Player statistics ==
No.	Pos.	Nat.	Player	D.o.B. (Age)	Height / Weight	J.League 1		Emperor's Cup		J.League Cup		Total	
No.	Pos.	Nat.	Player	D.o.B. (Age)	Height / Weight	Apps	Goals	Apps	Goals	Apps	Goals	Apps	Goals
1	GK	(Japan)	Hayato Okanaka	September 26, 1968 (aged 32)	cm / kg	0	0						
2	DF	(Japan)	Shin Asahina	August 20, 1976 (aged 24)	cm / kg	6	0						
3	DF	(Japan)	Masao Kiba	September 6, 1974 (aged 26)	cm / kg	30	0						
4	DF	(Japan)	Noritada Saneyoshi	October 19, 1972 (aged 28)	cm / kg	1	0						
5	DF	(Japan)	Satoshi Yamaguchi	April 17, 1978 (aged 22)	cm / kg	22	2						
6	MF	(Japan)	Junichi Inamoto	September 18, 1979 (aged 21)	cm / kg	13	2						
7	DF	(Japan)	Tomohiro Katanosaka	April 18, 1971 (aged 29)	cm / kg	10	0						
8	MF	(Japan)	Hitoshi Morishita	September 21, 1972 (aged 28)	cm / kg	5	0						
9	FW	(Croatia)	Nino Bule	March 19, 1976 (aged 24)	cm / kg	27	17						
10	MF	(Brazil)	Vital	February 29, 1976 (aged 25)	cm / kg	20	6						
11	MF	(Japan)	Hiromi Kojima	December 12, 1977 (aged 23)	cm / kg	17	2						
13	DF	(Japan)	Arata Kodama	October 8, 1982 (aged 18)	cm / kg	0	0						
14	MF	(Japan)	Takayuki Yamaguchi	August 1, 1973 (aged 27)	cm / kg	7	0						
15	MF	(Japan)	Shinsuke Sakimoto	April 14, 1982 (aged 18)	cm / kg	2	0						
16	MF	(Japan)	Takahiro Futagawa	June 27, 1980 (aged 20)	cm / kg	26	2						
17	DF	(Japan)	Toru Araiba	July 12, 1979 (aged 21)	cm / kg	29	3						
18	FW	(Japan)	Kota Yoshihara	February 2, 1978 (aged 23)	cm / kg	27	11						
19	MF	(Japan)	Yasuhito Endō	January 28, 1980 (aged 21)	cm / kg	29	4						
20	DF	(France)	Claude Dambury	July 30, 1971 (aged 29)	cm / kg	6	0						
20	MF	(Bosnia and Herzegovina)	Mirko Hrgović	February 5, 1979 (aged 22)	cm / kg	4	0						
21	MF	(Japan)	Yoshiki Okamura	March 21, 1977 (aged 23)	cm / kg	0	0						
22	GK	(Japan)	Naoki Matsuyo	April 9, 1974 (aged 26)	cm / kg	1	0						
23	GK	(Japan)	Ryōta Tsuzuki	April 18, 1978 (aged 22)	cm / kg	29	0						
24	FW	(Japan)	Masanobu Matsunami	November 21, 1974 (aged 26)	cm / kg	26	1						
25	DF	(Japan)	Yusuke Igawa	October 30, 1982 (aged 18)	cm / kg	1	0						
26	FW	(Japan)	Satoshi Nakayama	November 7, 1981 (aged 19)	cm / kg	3	0						
27	MF	(Japan)	Hideo Hashimoto	May 21, 1979 (aged 21)	cm / kg	17	0						
28	DF	(Japan)	Koichi Hashigaito	March 30, 1982 (aged 18)	cm / kg	0	0						
30	GK	(Japan)	Koichi Ae	April 15, 1976 (aged 24)	cm / kg	0	0						
31	GK	(Japan)	Suguru Hino	July 29, 1982 (aged 18)	cm / kg	0	0						
32	MF	(Japan)	Naohiro Tamura	July 3, 1978 (aged 22)	cm / kg	0	0						
33	DF	(Japan)	Hiroshige Yanagimoto	October 15, 1972 (aged 28)	cm / kg	28	0						
35	DF	(Japan)	Tsuneyasu Miyamoto	February 7, 1977 (aged 24)	cm / kg	24	0						
36	MF	(Japan)	Haruki Seto	March 14, 1978 (aged 22)	cm / kg	0	0						
37	MF	(Japan)	Motoki Kawasaki	February 2, 1979 (aged 22)	cm / kg	0	0						
