= Masanobu Matsunami =

Japanese footballer

Masanobu Matsunami 松波 正信
Personal information
- Full name: Masanobu Matsunami
- Date of birth: November 21, 1974 (age 51)
- Place of birth: Gifu, Gifu, Japan
- Height: 1.80 m (5 ft 11 in)
- Position: Forward

Youth career
- 1990–1992: Teikyo High School

Senior career*
| Years | Team | Apps | (Gls) |
| 1993–2005 | Gamba Osaka | 280 | (45) |
| Total | | 280 | (45) |

Managerial career
- 2012: Gamba Osaka
- 2014–2015: Gainare Tottori
- 2021: Gamba Osaka
Medal record
Gamba Osaka
| Winner | J1 League | 2005 |
| Runner-up | J.League Cup | 2005 |
- * Club domestic league appearances and goals

Masanobu Matsunami (松波 正信, Matsunami Masanobu; born November 21, 1974) is a former Japanese football player and manager and currently academy manager for Gamba Osaka.

== Playing career ==
Matsunami was born in Gifu on November 21, 1974. After graduating from high school, he joined Gamba Osaka in 1993. He played as regular player from the first season. On 20 November, he became the youngest player to score a hat-trick in J1 League at age 18 years, 364 days. In 1997, he played with Patrick M'Boma and he played all 32 matches and scored 13 goals. M'Boma also scored 25 goals and became a top scorer. In 2000s, although he played as substitutes behind young players Hiromi Kojima, Kota Yoshihara and so on, he played many matches. In 2005, the club won the champions J1 League first league champions in club history. The club also won the 2nd place 2005 J.League Cup. He retired end of 2005 season.

== Coaching career ==
After retirement, Matsunami started coaching career at Gamba Osaka in 2006. He mainly coached for youth team until 2009. In 2010, he became a coach for top team under manager Akira Nishino. In 2012, José Carlos Serrão became new manager as Nishino successor. However, the club's results were bad and Serrão was sacked in March. Matsunami named new manager as Serrão successor. However, the club was relegated to J2 League end of season. Although the club won the 2nd place Emperor's Cup, he resigned end of 2012 season. In 2014, he moved to newly was relegated to J3 League club, Gainare Tottori. Although he managed in 2 seasons, the club could not return to J2 and he resigned end of 2015 season.

== Career statistics ==
Appearances and goals by club, season and competition
| Club | Season | League | | | Emperor's Cup | | J.League Cup | | Total | |
| Club | Season | Division | Apps | Goals | Apps | Goals | Apps | Goals | Apps | Goals |
|---|---|---|---|---|---|---|---|---|---|---|
| Gamba Osaka | 1993 | J1 League | 29 | 7 | 1 | 2 | 4 | 1 | 34 | 10 |
| Gamba Osaka | 1994 | J1 League | 21 | 4 | 4 | 0 | 0 | 0 | 25 | 4 |
| Gamba Osaka | 1995 | J1 League | 15 | 0 | 0 | 0 | — | | 15 | 0 |
| Gamba Osaka | 1996 | J1 League | 20 | 5 | 4 | 2 | 12 | 3 | 36 | 10 |
| Gamba Osaka | 1997 | J1 League | 32 | 13 | 3 | 0 | 6 | 1 | 41 | 14 |
| Gamba Osaka | 1998 | J1 League | 25 | 1 | 0 | 0 | 2 | 0 | 27 | 1 |
| Gamba Osaka | 1999 | J1 League | 23 | 5 | 0 | 0 | 4 | 0 | 27 | 5 |
| Gamba Osaka | 2000 | J1 League | 29 | 4 | 4 | 0 | 4 | 2 | 37 | 6 |
| Gamba Osaka | 2001 | J1 League | 26 | 1 | 3 | 1 | 4 | 4 | 33 | 6 |
| Gamba Osaka | 2002 | J1 League | 23 | 5 | 1 | 0 | 6 | 0 | 30 | 5 |
| Gamba Osaka | 2003 | J1 League | 17 | 0 | 2 | 1 | 4 | 1 | 23 | 2 |
| Gamba Osaka | 2004 | J1 League | 9 | 0 | 1 | 1 | 2 | 0 | 12 | 1 |
| Gamba Osaka | 2005 | J1 League | 11 | 0 | 2 | 1 | 5 | 2 | 18 | 3 |
| Career total | | | 280 | 45 | 21 | 8 | 53 | 14 | 354 | 67 |

== Managerial statistics ==
| Team | From | To | Record | | | | |
| Team | From | To | G | W | D | L | Win % |
|---|---|---|---|---|---|---|---|
| Gamba Osaka | 2012 | 2012 | 31 | 9 | 11 | 11 | 29.03 |
| Gainare Tottori | 2014 | 2015 | 69 | 28 | 19 | 22 | 40.58 |
| Total | | | 100 | 37 | 30 | 33 | 37.00 |
