= 1996 Gamba Osaka season =

Gamba Osaka
1996 season
- Manager: Josip Kuže
- Stadium: Expo '70 Commemorative Stadium
- J.League: 12th
- Emperor's Cup: Semifinals
- J.League Cup: GL-A 6th
- Top goalscorer: League: Mladen Mladenović (11); All: Hans Gillhaus (14)
- Highest home attendance: 12,431 (vs Verdy Kawasaki, 2 November 1996); 13,517 (vs Nagoya Grampus Eight, 26 October 1996, Ishikawa Kanazawa Stadium)
- Lowest home attendance: 5,025 (vs Júbilo Iwata, 2 October 1996)
- Average home league attendance: 8,004
Home colours	Away colours

1996 Gamba Osaka season

== Review and events ==
=== League results summary ===
Overall								Home						Away					
Pld	W	D	L	GF	GA	GD	Pts	W	D	L	GF	GA	GD	W	D	L	GF	GA	GD
30	11	0	19	38	59	−21	33	8	0	7	24	28	−4	3	0	12	14	31	−17

Source: J.LEAGUE OFFICIAL GUIDE 1997. ISBN 4-09-102329-0.

=== League results by round ===
Round	1	2	3	4	5	6	7	8	9	10	11	12	13	14	15	16	17	18	19	20	21	22	23	24	25	26	27	28	29	30
Ground	A	H	A	H	A	H	A	H	A	A	H	H	A	H	A	A	H	A	H	H	A	H	A	H	A	H	A	H	A	H
Result	W	L	L	W	L	W	L	W	W	L	W	L	L	W	W	L	L	L	W	L	L	L	L	W	L	L	L	L	L	W
Position	5	8	10	9	11	8	9	9	7	8	8	8	10	9	9	10	10	11	10	10	10	10	11	11	11	12	13	12	13	12

Source: J.LEAGUE OFFICIAL GUIDE 1997. ISBN 4-09-102329-0.
A = Away; H = Home; W = Win; D = Draw; L = Loss

== Competitions ==
Competitions	Position
J.League	12th / 16 clubs
Emperor's Cup	Semifinals
J.League Cup	GL-A 6th / 8 clubs

== Domestic results ==
=== J.League ===
16 March 1996 1	Yokohama Marinos	1–2	Gamba Osaka	Yokohama Mitsuzawa Football Stadium
19:05 JST (UTC+09)	Acosta 46'	J. League	Mladenović 44', 58'	Attendance: 11,728; Referee: Yasuhiro Matsuzaki; Assistant referees: Yū Nakamura, Toshiyuki Mayuzumi; Fourth official: Tasuku Onodera

20 March 1996 2	Gamba Osaka	0–1	Yokohama Flügels	Expo '70 Commemorative Stadium
15:00 JST (UTC+09)		J. League	Hattori 12'	Attendance: 9,739; Referee: Hideo Kikuchi; Assistant referees: Kazuhisa Osada, Takashi Aoki; Fourth official: Tsuyoshi Miyake

23 March 1996 3	Júbilo Iwata	2–0	Gamba Osaka	Júbilo Iwata Stadium
14:04 JST (UTC+09)	Nakayama 72'; Schillaci 77'	J. League		Attendance: 11,927; Referee: Tatsumi Ōno; Assistant referees: Kimio Izaki, Kō Ōishi; Fourth official: Tōru Nagata

30 March 1996 4	Gamba Osaka	2–2 (V-goal) (a.e.t.) (4–3 p)	Shimizu S-Pulse	Expo '70 Commemorative Stadium
15:00 JST (UTC+09)	Mladenović 2', 54'	J. League	Nagai 25'; Y. Matsubara 89'	Attendance: 5,674; Referee: Kazuo Kakihana; Assistant referees: Naoki Esumi, Ichirō Inukai; Fourth official: Tsuyoshi Miyake
	Penalties
	(penalty scored) Matsuyama; (penalty scored) Morishita; (penalty scored) Škrinjar; (penalty scored) Kiba		(penalty missed) Oliva; (penalty scored) Morioka; (penalty scored) Santos; (penalty scored) T. Itō; (penalty missed) Andō

3 April 1996 5	Urawa Red Diamonds	4–1	Gamba Osaka	Urawa Komaba Stadium
19:04 JST (UTC+09)	Fukunaga 57'; Bein 65'; Buchwald 73'; Tsuchihashi 76'	J. League	Gillhaus 16'	Attendance: 20,614; Referee: Fumikazu Shioyazono; Assistant referees: Mitsuru Satō, Masaaki Shimomura; Fourth official: Ichirō Kuwabara

6 April 1996 6	Gamba Osaka	2–1 (V-goal) (a.e.t.)	Sanfrecce Hiroshima	Expo '70 Commemorative Stadium
15:00 JST (UTC+09)	Mladenović 73'; Matsunami 98'	J. League	Noh 81'	Attendance: 7,042; Referee: Yasuhiro Hemmi; Assistant referees: Morihisa Yamaguchi, Akio Okutani; Fourth official: Tamotsu Ōnishi

13 April 1996 7	Nagoya Grampus Eight	2–0	Gamba Osaka	Nagoya Mizuho Athletics Stadium
15:03 JST (UTC+09)	Hirano 3'; Stojković 72'	J. League		Attendance: 22,105; Referee: Yasuhiro Matsuzaki; Assistant referees: Yoshikazu Hiroshima, Ichirō Inukai; Fourth official: Takafumi Igarashi

17 April 1996 8	Gamba Osaka	4–2	Kyoto Purple Sanga	Expo '70 Commemorative Stadium
19:01 JST (UTC+09)	Mladenović 11', 58'; Morishita 47'; Gillhaus 75'	J. League	Nagata 29'; Flavio 55'	Attendance: 6,349; Referee: Piotr Werner; Assistant referees: Hideaki Harada, Yasushi Tsuchimoto; Fourth official: Tamotsu Ōnishi

20 April 1996 9	Verdy Kawasaki	2–3	Gamba Osaka	Kawasaki Todoroki Stadium
19:01 JST (UTC+09)	K. Miura 40'; 43' (o.g.)	J. League	Hiraoka 59'; Morishita 77'; Matsunami 87'	Attendance: 10,858; Referee: Archundia; Assistant referees: Hiroshi Fukuda, Hisaharu Kitamura; Fourth official: Kenji Ōgiya

27 April 1996 10	JEF United Ichihara	2–1	Gamba Osaka	Yamagata Park Stadium
16:00 JST (UTC+09)	Jō 49'; Igarashi 89'	J. League	Matsunami 74'	Attendance: 13,153; Referee: Hiroshi Tanabe; Assistant referees: Toshiyuki Mayuzumi, Satoru Ishizawa; Fourth official: Masaki Abe

1 May 1996 11	Gamba Osaka	2–1 (V-goal) (a.e.t.)	Bellmare Hiratsuka	Expo '70 Commemorative Stadium
19:00 JST (UTC+09)	Matsunami 3'; Kitamura 110'	J. League	Noguchi 31'	Attendance: 7,153; Referee: Shinichirō Obata; Assistant referees: Morihisa Yamaguchi, Kazuhiko Matsumura; Fourth official: Tamotsu Ōnishi

4 May 1996 12	Gamba Osaka	1–7	Kashiwa Reysol	Expo '70 Commemorative Stadium
14:00 JST (UTC+09)	Mladenović 70'	J. League	Edílson 48', 63', 77', 87', 88'; N. Katō 55'; Arima 89'	Attendance: 10,646; Referee: Tōru Kamikawa; Assistant referees: Hideaki Harada, Hiroyuki Izumi; Fourth official: Tsuyoshi Miyake

11 May 1996 13	Kashima Antlers	4–0	Gamba Osaka	Kashima Soccer Stadium
14:59 JST (UTC+09)	Mazinho 25'; Hasegawa 29'; 40' (o.g.); Sōma 66'	J. League		Attendance: 15,142; Referee: Kiyoshi Ōta; Assistant referees: Yū Nakamura, Masahiro Katagiri; Fourth official: Masato Nogami

15 May 1996 14	Gamba Osaka	3–0	Avispa Fukuoka	Expo '70 Commemorative Stadium
19:00 JST (UTC+09)	Gillhaus 49'; Morioka 63'; Škrinjar 87'	J. League		Attendance: 5,389; Referee: Zoran Petrović; Assistant referees: Takayoshi Kashino, Takuji Fukazawa; Fourth official: Tamotsu Ōnishi

18 May 1996 15	Cerezo Osaka	0–2	Gamba Osaka	Osaka Nagai No.2 Stadium
15:00 JST (UTC+09)		J. League	Gillhaus 52'; Kiba 89'	Attendance: 9,325; Referee: Kazuo Kakihana; Assistant referees: Takashi Kunori, Naoki Esumi; Fourth official: Tsuyoshi Miyake

28 August 1996 16	Kashiwa Reysol	1–0	Gamba Osaka	Hitachi Kashiwa Soccer Stadium
19:00 JST (UTC+09)	Ishikawa 16'	J. League		Attendance: 6,093; Referee: Tetsuya Hamana; Assistant referees: Hiroshi Fukuda, Takao Onshi; Fourth official: Kōji Sugikawa

31 August 1996 17	Gamba Osaka	0–1	Kashima Antlers	Expo '70 Commemorative Stadium
19:00 JST (UTC+09)		J. League	Yanagisawa 57'	Attendance: 8,665; Referee: Leslie Mottram; Assistant referees: Sōichirō Kaneko, Tōru Yamashiro; Fourth official: Tamotsu Ōnishi

7 September 1996 18	Avispa Fukuoka	1–0	Gamba Osaka	Hakatanomori Football Stadium
18:29 JST (UTC+09)	23' (o.g.)	J. League		Attendance: 6,596; Referee: Shinichirō Obata; Assistant referees: Noboru Ishiyama, Hideaki Harada; Fourth official: Daikichi Kanada

14 September 1996 19	Gamba Osaka	2–0	Cerezo Osaka	Expo '70 Commemorative Stadium
16:04 JST (UTC+09)	Matsuyama 53'; Matsunami 58'	J. League		Attendance: 7,210; Referee: Zoran Petrović; Assistant referees: Yoshikazu Hiroshima, Kōji Minami; Fourth official: Sōichirō Kaneko

21 September 1996 20	Gamba Osaka	4–5 (V-goal) (a.e.t.)	Yokohama Marinos	Expo '70 Commemorative Stadium
15:00 JST (UTC+09)	Matsuyama 9'; Mladenović 50', 83'; Babunski 75'	J. League	Acosta 1' 117'; Bisconti 34', 57'; Omura 63'	Attendance: 7,874; Referee: Hiroshi Tanabe; Assistant referees: Satoru Kawano, Takayoshi Kashino; Fourth official: Tsuyoshi Miyake

28 September 1996 21	Yokohama Flügels	3–2 (V-goal) (a.e.t.)	Gamba Osaka	Yokohama Mitsuzawa Football Stadium
18:33 JST (UTC+09)	Hattori 21'; Evair 42' 102'	J. League	Mladenović 48'; Shimada 67'	Attendance: 7,035; Referee: Leslie Mottram; Assistant referees: Kazuaki Hamaguchi, Toshimitsu Yoshida; Fourth official: Kenji Ōgiya

2 October 1996 22	Gamba Osaka	0–1	Júbilo Iwata	Expo '70 Commemorative Stadium
19:00 JST (UTC+09)		J. League	Schillaci 15'	Attendance: 5,025; Referee: Zoran Petrović; Assistant referees: Akio Okutani, Hiroyuki Izumi; Fourth official: Tamotsu Ōnishi

5 October 1996 23	Shimizu S-Pulse	3–2 (V-goal) (a.e.t.)	Gamba Osaka	Nihondaira Sports Stadium
15:04 JST (UTC+09)	Nagai 79'; T. Itō 84'; Mukōjima 106'	J. League	Gillhaus 44', 49'	Attendance: 11,046; Referee: Hiroyuki Umemoto; Assistant referees: Yasushi Tsuchimoto, Akihisa Makino; Fourth official: Masakazu Hōjō

16 October 1996 24	Gamba Osaka	1–0 (V-goal) (a.e.t.)	Urawa Red Diamonds	Expo '70 Commemorative Stadium
19:00 JST (UTC+09)	Gillhaus 93'	J. League		Attendance: 5,254; Referee: Shinichirō Obata; Assistant referees: Hideaki Harada, Satoru Ishizawa; Fourth official: Tamotsu Ōnishi

19 October 1996 25	Sanfrecce Hiroshima	2–0	Gamba Osaka	Ehime Matsuyama Athletic Stadium
18:34 JST (UTC+09)	Noh 51'; Huistra 56'	J. League		Attendance: 7,202; Referee: Kazuo Kakihana; Assistant referees: Satoru Kawano, Tōru Yamashiro; Fourth official: Hiroshi Yoshinouchi

26 October 1996 26	Gamba Osaka	0–3	Nagoya Grampus Eight	Ishikawa Kanazawa Stadium
15:04 JST (UTC+09)		J. League	Stojković 38'; Mochizuki 60'; Hirano 63'	Attendance: 13,517; Referee: Bemard Saules; Assistant referees: Hisaharu Kitamura, Kō Ōishi; Fourth official: Tsutomu Kaji

30 October 1996 27	Kyoto Purple Sanga	2–1	Gamba Osaka	Kyoto Nishikyogoku Stadium
19:04 JST (UTC+09)	Edmílson 62'; Carlos 70'	J. League	Škrinjar 54'	Attendance: 7,003; Referee: Hiroshi Tanabe; Assistant referees: Yoshikazu Hiroshima, Takashi Aoki; Fourth official: Yoshihisa Takahashi

2 November 1996 28	Gamba Osaka	1–3	Verdy Kawasaki	Expo '70 Commemorative Stadium
15:01 JST (UTC+09)	Kojima 60'	J. League	Magrão 53', 66'; K. Miura 86'	Attendance: 12,431; Referee: Leslie Mottram; Assistant referees: Sōichirō Kaneko, Ichirō Inukai; Fourth official: Tsuyoshi Miyake

6 November 1996 29	Bellmare Hiratsuka	2–0	Gamba Osaka	Hiratsuka Stadium
19:00 JST (UTC+09)	8' (o.g.); Noguchi 88'	J. League		Attendance: 6,335; Referee: Keiichi Sunakawa; Assistant referees: Kenichi Koshiyama, Masaaki Shimomura; Fourth official: Jun Hirayama

9 November 1996 30	Gamba Osaka	2–1	JEF United Ichihara	Expo '70 Commemorative Stadium
14:30 JST (UTC+09)	Isogai 34'; Gillhaus 89'	J. League	Jō 35'	Attendance: 8,090; Referee: Yasuhiro Hemmi; Assistant referees: Naoyuki Mori, Masatoshi Shibata; Fourth official: Akio Okutani

=== Emperor's Cup ===
1st Round	bye

2nd Round	bye

17 November 1996 3rd Round	Gamba Osaka	4–1	Montedio Yamagata	Expo '70 Commemorative Stadium
: JST (UTC+09)	Isogai ?'; Hiraoka ?'; Matsunami ?'; Mladenović ?'		? ?'	Attendance: 1,028

23 December 1996 4th Round	Gamba Osaka	3–1	Fujitsu Kawasaki FC	Kawasaki Todoroki Stadium
: JST (UTC+09)	Morishita ?'; Matsunami ?'; Gillhaus ?'		? ?'	Attendance: 5,531

26 December 1996 Quarterfinals	Kyoto Purple Sanga	2–3	Gamba Osaka	Yokohama Mitsuzawa Football Stadium
: JST (UTC+09)	? ?' ? ?'		Isogai ?'; Gillhaus ?'; Kojima ?'	Attendance: 1,413

29 December 1996 Semifinals	Gamba Osaka	0–2	Sanfrecce Hiroshima	Expo '70 Commemorative Stadium
: JST (UTC+09)			? ?' ? ?'	Attendance: 8,452

=== J.League Cup ===
1 June 1996 GL-A-1-1	Yokohama Marinos	2–3	Gamba Osaka	Yokohama Mitsuzawa Football Stadium
16:00 JST (UTC+09)	Miura 56', 77'	J. League	Isogai 15', 52'; Gillhaus 18'	Attendance: 9,552; Referee: Naotsugu Fuse; Assistant referees: Hiroshi Fukuda, Hitoshi Nakagomi; Fourth official: Michio Nakahara

5 June 1996 GL-A-1-2	Gamba Osaka	1–1 (4–3 agg.)	Yokohama Marinos	Expo '70 Commemorative Stadium
19:00 JST (UTC+09)	Matsuyama 66'	J. League	T. Yamada 79'	Attendance: 7,114; Referee: Hideo Kikuchi; Assistant referees: Morihisa Yamaguchi, Hiroyuki Ōnishi; Fourth official: Tamotsu Ōnishi

8 June 1996 GL-A-2-1	Júbilo Iwata	3–1	Gamba Osaka	Júbilo Iwata Stadium
19:02 JST (UTC+09)	Nanami 23'; Fujita 30'; Schillaci 89'	J. League	Gillhaus 12'	Attendance: 13,150; Referee: Yoshimi Ogawa; Assistant referees: Naoyuki Mori, Kōji Minami; Fourth official: Toshiaki Futamata

12 June 1996 GL-A-2-2	Gamba Osaka	0–5 (1–8 agg.)	Júbilo Iwata	Expo '70 Commemorative Stadium
19:00 JST (UTC+09)	Vanenburg 30'; Nakayama 34', 89'; Takeda 35'; Ōkura 71'	J. League		Attendance: 5,421; Referee: Archundia; Assistant referees: Yoshikazu Hiroshima, Kazuhiko Matsumura; Fourth official: Tamotsu Ōnishi

15 June 1996 GL-A-3-1	Sanfrecce Hiroshima	1–1	Gamba Osaka	Oita Athletic Stadium
18:31 JST (UTC+09)	Kubo 84'	J. League	Matsuyama 21'	Attendance: 4,105; Referee: Zoran Petrović; Assistant referees: Noboru Ishiyama, Masatoshi Shibata; Fourth official: Tsunenori Nagamatsu

19 June 1996 GL-A-3-2	Gamba Osaka	0–3 (1–4 agg.)	Sanfrecce Hiroshima	Expo '70 Commemorative Stadium
19:00 JST (UTC+09)		J. League	Moriyasu 37'; Kubo 47'; Michiki 50'	Attendance: 5,074; Referee: Yasuhiro Matsuzaki; Assistant referees: Satoru Ishizawa, Takayoshi Kashino; Fourth official: Tamotsu Ōnishi

22 June 1996 GL-A-4-1	Gamba Osaka	4–3	Kyoto Purple Sanga	Expo '70 Commemorative Stadium
19:04 JST (UTC+09)	Matsunami 18', 31'; 57' (o.g.); Morioka 76'	J. League	To. Yamaguchi 72'; Matsuhashi 84'; Ōkuma 89'	Attendance: 8,519; Referee: Fumikazu Shioyazono; Assistant referees: Hiroyuki Izumi, Kazuhisa Osada; Fourth official: Tsuyoshi Miyake

26 June 1996 GL-A-4-2	Kyoto Purple Sanga	1–2 (4–6 agg.)	Gamba Osaka	Kyoto Nishikyogoku Stadium
19:04 JST (UTC+09)	Raudnei 77'	J. League	Škrinjar 43'; Matsunami 62'	Attendance: 8,508; Referee: Tōru Kamikawa; Assistant referees: Toshimitsu Yoshida, Kazuhiko Matsumura; Fourth official: Yōzō Tanaka

29 June 1996 GL-A-5-1	Gamba Osaka	1–4	Kashiwa Reysol	Expo '70 Commemorative Stadium
19:00 JST (UTC+09)	Gillhaus 41'	J. League	Date 38'; Valdir 62'; Arima 66'; N. Katō 85'	Attendance: 5,323; Referee: Piotr Werner; Assistant referees: Naoyuki Mori, Hiroyuki Ōnishi; Fourth official: Sōichirō Kaneko

3 July 1996 GL-A-5-2	Kashiwa Reysol	2–0 (6–1 agg.)	Gamba Osaka	Hitachi Kashiwa Soccer Stadium
19:00 JST (UTC+09)	Watanabe 22'; Edílson 53'	J. League		Attendance: 6,062; Referee: Yoshimi Ogawa; Assistant referees: Tetsu Karakida, Akihisa Makino; Fourth official: Katsuhiko Takayama

10 August 1996 GL-A-6-1	Gamba Osaka	1–1	Bellmare Hiratsuka	Expo '70 Commemorative Stadium
19:00 JST (UTC+09)	Gillhaus 50'	J. League	Simão 36'	Attendance: 5,730; Referee: Yoshitsugu Katayama; Assistant referees: Kazuya Yanagisawa, Takashi Aoki; Fourth official: Tsuyoshi Miyake

14 August 1996 GL-A-6-2	Bellmare Hiratsuka	0–0 (1–1 agg.)	Gamba Osaka	Hiratsuka Stadium
19:00 JST (UTC+09)		J. League		Attendance: 6,709; Referee: Hideo Kikuchi; Assistant referees: Kimio Izaki, Tetsu Karakida; Fourth official: Kazuhiko Uchida

17 August 1996 GL-A-7-1	Gamba Osaka	1–1	Urawa Red Diamonds	Expo '70 Commemorative Stadium
19:00 JST (UTC+09)	Matsuyama 89'	J. League	Ōshiba 58'	Attendance: 8,010; Referee: Tōru Kamikawa; Assistant referees: Morihisa Yamaguchi, Akio Okutani; Fourth official: Sōichirō Kaneko

21 August 1996 GL-A-7-2	Urawa Red Diamonds	3–0 (4–1 agg.)	Gamba Osaka	Urawa Komaba Stadium
19:03 JST (UTC+09)	Taguchi 7'; Ōshiba 19'; Okano 34'	J. League		Attendance: 18,483; Referee: Bemard Saules; Assistant referees: Masahiro Katagiri, Takayoshi Kashino; Fourth official: Izumi Okada

== Player statistics ==
No.	Pos	Nat	Player	Total		J.League		Emperor's Cup		J.League Cup	
No.	Pos	Nat	Player	Apps	Goals	Apps	Goals	Apps	Goals	Apps	Goals
	GK	(Japan) JPN	Kenji Honnami	26	0	16	0	4	0	6	0
	GK	(Japan) JPN	Atsushi Shirai	0	0	0	0	0	0	0	0
	GK	(Japan) JPN	Hayato Okanaka	24	0	16	0	0	0	8	0
	GK	(Japan) JPN	Hiroyuki Kishi	0	0	0	0	0	0	0	0
	DF	(Japan) JPN	Takahiro Shimada	25	1	10	1	4	0	11	0
	DF	(Ukraine) UKR	Tsveiba	32	0	17	0	3	0	12	0
	DF	(Japan) JPN	Takeshi Yonezawa	0	0	0	0	0	0	0	0
	DF	(Japan) JPN	Yūji Hashimoto	5	0	1	0	0	0	4	0
	DF	(Japan) JPN	Keiju Karashima	20	0	11	0	0	0	9	0
	DF	(Japan) JPN	Takashi Kiyama	14	0	12	0	2	0	0	0
	DF	(Japan) JPN	Noritada Saneyoshi	42	0	28	0	4	0	10	0
	DF	(Japan) JPN	Takehiro Katō	5	0	5	0	0	0	0	0
	DF	(Japan) JPN	Masao Kiba	38	1	22	1	3	0	13	0
	DF	(Japan) JPN	Tsuneyasu Miyamoto	22	0	13	0	2	0	7	0
	DF	(Japan) JPN	Kōjirō Kaimoto	10	0	5	0	0	0	5	0
	DF	(Japan) JPN	Daiju Matsumoto	0	0	0	0	0	0	0	0
	MF	(Belarus) BLR	Aleinikov	0	0	0	0	0	0	0	0
	MF	(Croatia) CRO	Mladenović	23	12	20	11	1	1	2	0
	MF	(Japan) JPN	Yoshiyuki Matsuyama	40	5	24	2	4	0	12	3
	MF	(Japan) JPN	Kunio Kitamura	3	1	1	1	0	0	2	0
	MF	(Japan) JPN	Hiromitsu Isogai	33	5	20	1	4	2	9	2
	MF	(Croatia) CRO	Škrinjar	26	3	15	2	0	0	11	1
	MF	(Japan) JPN	Sōjirō Ishii	0	0	0	0	0	0	0	0
	MF	(Japan) JPN	Masafumi Nakaguchi	0	0	0	0	0	0	0	0
	MF	(Japan) JPN	Kōji Kondō	36	0	24	0	3	0	9	0
	MF	(Japan) JPN	Hideki Yoshioka	0	0	0	0	0	0	0	0
	MF	(Japan) JPN	Hitoshi Morishita	45	3	28	2	4	1	13	0
	MF	(Japan) JPN	Naoki Hiraoka	39	2	24	1	3	1	12	0
	MF	(Japan) JPN	Shigeru Morioka	25	2	16	1	0	0	9	1
	MF	(Japan) JPN	Hideki Nomiyama	2	0	0	0	0	0	2	0
	MF	(Japan) JPN	Kenji Takagi	0	0	0	0	0	0	0	0
	MF	(Japan) JPN	Hiromi Kojima	14	2	9	1	3	1	2	0
	FW	(Netherlands) NED	Gillhaus	40	14	23	8	4	2	13	4
	FW	(Japan) JPN	Toshihiro Yamaguchi	11	0	11	0	0	0	0	0
	FW	(Japan) JPN	Hiroto Yamamura	0	0	0	0	0	0	0	0
	FW	(Japan) JPN	Masanobu Matsunami	36	10	20	5	4	2	12	3
	FW	(Japan) JPN	Kensuke Nishijima	0	0	0	0	0	0	0	0
	FW	(Japan) JPN	Yūzo Funakoshi	0	0	0	0	0	0	0	0
	DF	(North Macedonia) MKD	Babunski †	21	1	14	1	4	0	3	0

- † player(s) joined the team after the opening of this season.

== Transfers ==
In:

No.	Pos.	Nation	Player
—	GK	JPN	Hiroyuki Kishi (from Mikage Kogyo High School)
—	DF	JPN	Takeshi Yonezawa (from Júbilo Iwata)
—	DF	JPN	Kōjirō Kaimoto (from Tokai University Gyosei High School)
—	DF	JPN	Daiju Matsumoto (from Maebashi Commercial High School)
—	MF	CRO	Mladen Mladenović (from Salzburg)
—	MF	JPN	Hideki Yoshioka (from Yokohama Flügels)
—	MF	JPN	Hiromi Kojima (from Higashi Fukuoka High School)
—	FW	JPN	Yūzo Funakoshi (from Kunimi High School)

Out:

No.	Pos.	Nation	Player
—	GK	JPN	Tōru Kawashima (to Vortis Tokushima)
—	DF	JPN	Shōji Nonoshita (to Yokohama Flügels)
—	DF	JPN	Kaoru Asano
—	DF	JPN	Tomohiro Mori (to Honda Motor)
—	MF	JPN	Masayuki Mita (to Sony Sendai)
—	MF	JPN	Akira Kubota
—	MF	JPN	Taizō Komai
—	MF	JPN	Kazuya Matsuda (to Albireo Niigata)
—	MF	JPN	Masao Kiba
—	MF	JPN	Akio Matsuyama
—	FW	UKR	Protassov
—	FW	JPN	Hirohito Nakamura (to Honda Motor)

== Transfers during the season ==
=== In ===
- (North Macedonia) Babunski (from Lleida on July)

=== Out ===
- (Belarus) Sergei Aleinikov (on July)
- (Japan) Atsushi Shirai (to Consadole Sapporo)
- (Japan) Toshihiro Yamaguchi (to Kyoto Purple Sanga)
- (Japan) Yūzo Funakoshi (loan to Telstar on July)

== Awards ==
none

== Other pages ==
- (in Japanese) J. League official site
- (in Japanese) Gamba Osaka official site
