= 1999 Gamba Osaka season =

Gamba Osaka
1999 season
- Manager: Antonetti; Hiroshi Hayano
- Stadium: Osaka Expo '70 Stadium
- J. League 1: 11th
- Emperor's Cup: 4th Round
- J. League Cup: 2nd Round
- Top goalscorer: Luizinho (6); Hiromi Kojima (6)
Home colours	Away colours

1999 Gamba Osaka season

== Competitions ==
Competitions	Position
J. League 1	11th / 16 clubs
Emperor's Cup	4th Round
J. League Cup	2nd Round

== Domestic results ==
=== J. League 1 ===
6 March 1999 1-1	Urawa Red Diamonds	2-1	Gamba Osaka	Urawa Komaba Stadium
JST (UTC+09)

13 March 1999 1-2	Gamba Osaka	3-2 (GG) (a.e.t.)	Nagoya Grampus Eight	Osaka Expo '70 Stadium
JST (UTC+09)

20 March 1999 1-3	Gamba Osaka	3-2	Avispa Fukuoka	Osaka Expo '70 Stadium
JST (UTC+09)

27 March 1999 1-4	JEF United Ichihara	3-2 (GG) (a.e.t.)	Gamba Osaka	Ichihara Seaside Stadium
JST (UTC+09)

3 April 1999 1-5	Gamba Osaka	2-1	Vissel Kobe	Osaka Expo '70 Stadium
JST (UTC+09)

10 April 1999 1-6	Sanfrecce Hiroshima	2-0	Gamba Osaka	Hiroshima Stadium
JST (UTC+09)

17 April 1999 1-7	Gamba Osaka	0-1	Verdy Kawasaki	Osaka Expo '70 Stadium
JST (UTC+09)

24 April 1999 1-8	Bellmare Hiratsuka	1-3	Gamba Osaka	Hiratsuka Athletics Stadium
JST (UTC+09)

28 April 1999 1-9	Gamba Osaka	1-2	Kyoto Purple Sanga	Osaka Expo '70 Stadium
JST (UTC+09)

1 May 1999 1-10	Kashiwa Reysol	4-2	Gamba Osaka	Hitachi Kashiwa Soccer Stadium
JST (UTC+09)

5 May 1999 1-11	Gamba Osaka	1-0	Yokohama F. Marinos	Osaka Expo '70 Stadium
JST (UTC+09)

8 May 1999 1-12	Shimizu S-Pulse	2-1	Gamba Osaka	Nihondaira Sports Stadium
JST (UTC+09)

15 May 1999 1-13	Gamba Osaka	1-2	Cerezo Osaka	Osaka Expo '70 Stadium
JST (UTC+09)

22 May 1999 1-14	Júbilo Iwata	1-0	Gamba Osaka	Júbilo Iwata Stadium
JST (UTC+09)

29 May 1999 1-15	Gamba Osaka	1-0	Kashima Antlers	Osaka Expo '70 Stadium
JST (UTC+09)

7 August 1999 2-1	Verdy Kawasaki	1-0	Gamba Osaka	Todoroki Athletics Stadium
JST (UTC+09)

14 August 1999 2-2	Gamba Osaka	2-1 (GG) (a.e.t.)	Bellmare Hiratsuka	Osaka Expo '70 Stadium
JST (UTC+09)

18 August 1999 2-3	Kyoto Purple Sanga	1-0	Gamba Osaka	Nishikyogoku Athletic Stadium
JST (UTC+09)

21 August 1999 2-4	Gamba Osaka	1-0	Kashiwa Reysol	Osaka Expo '70 Stadium
JST (UTC+09)

28 August 1999 2-5	Yokohama F. Marinos	3-0	Gamba Osaka	Niigata City Athletic Stadium
JST (UTC+09)

4 September 1999 2-6	Gamba Osaka	1-0	Shimizu S-Pulse	Osaka Expo '70 Stadium
JST (UTC+09)

11 September 1999 2-7	Cerezo Osaka	4-1	Gamba Osaka	Osaka Nagai Stadium
JST (UTC+09)

15 September 1999 2-8	Gamba Osaka	3-1	Júbilo Iwata	Osaka Expo '70 Stadium
JST (UTC+09)

18 September 1999 2-9	Kashima Antlers	1-0 (GG) (a.e.t.)	Gamba Osaka	Kashima Soccer Stadium
JST (UTC+09)

23 September 1999 2-10	Gamba Osaka	1-2	Urawa Red Diamonds	Osaka Expo '70 Stadium
JST (UTC+09)

30 October 1999 2-11	Avispa Fukuoka	1-3	Gamba Osaka	Hakatanomori Football Stadium
JST (UTC+09)

17 November 1999 2-12	Nagoya Grampus Eight	2-1	Gamba Osaka	Mizuho Athletic Stadium
JST (UTC+09)

20 November 1999 2-13	Gamba Osaka	1-1 (GG) (a.e.t.)	Sanfrecce Hiroshima	Osaka Expo '70 Stadium
JST (UTC+09)

23 November 1999 2-14	Vissel Kobe	2-1	Gamba Osaka	Kobe Universiade Memorial Stadium
JST (UTC+09)

27 November 1999 2-15	Gamba Osaka	0-1	JEF United Ichihara	Osaka Expo '70 Stadium
JST (UTC+09)

=== Emperor's Cup ===
1st Round	bye

2nd Round	bye

12 December 1999 3rd Round	Gamba Osaka	1-0	Omiya Ardija	Osaka Expo '70 Stadium
JST (UTC+09)

19 December 1999 4th Round	Yokohama F. Marinos	2-1	Gamba Osaka	Tottori Soccer Stadium
JST (UTC+09)

=== J. League Cup ===
7 April 1999 1st Round-1	Kawasaki Frontale	1-3	Gamba Osaka	Todoroki Athletics Stadium
JST (UTC+09)

14 April 1999 1st Round-2	Gamba Osaka	0-1 (3-2 agg.)	Kawasaki Frontale	Osaka Expo '70 Stadium
JST (UTC+09)

12 June 1999 2nd Round-1	Gamba Osaka	1-1	Kashima Antlers	Osaka Expo '70 Stadium
JST (UTC+09)

19 June 1999 2nd Round-2	Kashima Antlers	1-0 (2-1 agg.)	Gamba Osaka	Akita Yabase Stadium
JST (UTC+09)

== Player statistics ==
No.	Pos.	Nat.	Player	D.o.B. (Age)	Height / Weight	J. League 1		Emperor's Cup		J. League Cup		Total	
No.	Pos.	Nat.	Player	D.o.B. (Age)	Height / Weight	Apps	Goals	Apps	Goals	Apps	Goals	Apps	Goals
1	GK	(Japan)	Hayato Okanaka	September 26, 1968 (aged 30)	cm / kg	29	0						
2	DF	(Japan)	Shinsuke Shiotani	May 11, 1970 (aged 28)	cm / kg	2	0						
3	DF	(Japan)	Daisuke Saito	November 19, 1974 (aged 24)	cm / kg	14	0						
4	DF	(Japan)	Noritada Saneyoshi	October 19, 1972 (aged 26)	cm / kg	28	0						
5	DF	(France)	Claude Dambury	July 30, 1971 (aged 27)	cm / kg	27	2						
6	MF	(Japan)	Junichi Inamoto	September 18, 1979 (aged 19)	cm / kg	22	1						
7	DF	(Japan)	Naoki Hiraoka	May 24, 1973 (aged 25)	cm / kg	29	3						
8	MF	(Japan)	Hitoshi Morishita	September 21, 1972 (aged 26)	cm / kg	23	0						
9	FW	(Serbia and Montenegro)	Anto Drobnjak	September 21, 1968 (aged 30)	cm / kg	13	4						
9	FW	(Brazil)	Taílson	November 28, 1975 (aged 23)	cm / kg	14	3						
10	MF	(Poland)	Piotr Świerczewski	April 8, 1972 (aged 26)	cm / kg	12	2						
10	MF	(Brazil)	Luizinho	February 4, 1972 (aged 27)	cm / kg	15	6						
11	MF	(Japan)	Hiromi Kojima	December 12, 1977 (aged 21)	cm / kg	21	6						
13	DF	(Japan)	Kojiro Kaimoto	October 14, 1977 (aged 21)	cm / kg	0	0						
14	MF	(Japan)	Yuji Hironaga	July 25, 1975 (aged 23)	cm / kg	7	1						
15	DF	(Japan)	Masao Kiba	September 6, 1974 (aged 24)	cm / kg	26	0						
16	DF	(Japan)	Daiju Matsumoto	December 9, 1977 (aged 21)	cm / kg	0	0						
17	DF	(Japan)	Toru Araiba	July 12, 1979 (aged 19)	cm / kg	0	0						
18	FW	(Japan)	Ryūji Bando	August 2, 1979 (aged 19)	cm / kg	21	1						
19	FW	(Japan)	Kohei Hayashi	June 27, 1978 (aged 20)	cm / kg	1	0						
20	DF	(Japan)	Tsuneyasu Miyamoto	February 7, 1977 (aged 22)	cm / kg	30	0						
21	MF	(Japan)	Yoshiki Okamura	March 21, 1977 (aged 21)	cm / kg	0	0						
22	GK	(Japan)	Naoki Matsuyo	April 9, 1974 (aged 24)	cm / kg	0	0						
23	GK	(Japan)	Ryōta Tsuzuki	April 18, 1978 (aged 20)	cm / kg	2	0						
24	FW	(Japan)	Masanobu Matsunami	November 21, 1974 (aged 24)	cm / kg	23	5						
25	FW	(Japan)	Shinichi Yamaguchi	July 29, 1976 (aged 22)	cm / kg	0	0						
26	MF	(Japan)	Satoshi Fujita	September 23, 1976 (aged 22)	cm / kg	0	0						
27	DF	(Japan)	Shin Asahina	August 20, 1976 (aged 22)	cm / kg	4	0						
28	DF	(Japan)	Josuke Sato	November 19, 1975 (aged 23)	cm / kg	0	0						
29	FW	(Japan)	Masashi Oguro	May 4, 1980 (aged 18)	cm / kg	11	0						
30	GK	(Japan)	Koichi Ae	April 15, 1976 (aged 22)	cm / kg	0	0						
31	MF	(Japan)	Hideo Hashimoto	May 21, 1979 (aged 19)	cm / kg	4	0						
32	MF	(Japan)	Takahiro Futagawa	June 27, 1980 (aged 18)	cm / kg	5	0						
33	DF	(Japan)	Hiroshige Yanagimoto	October 15, 1972 (aged 26)	cm / kg	20	0						
34	DF	(Japan)	Toshimi Kikuchi	June 17, 1973 (aged 25)	cm / kg	3	0						

== Other pages ==
- (in Japanese) J. League official site
