= 2000 Gamba Osaka season =

Gamba Osaka
2000 season
- Manager: Hiroshi Hayano
- Stadium: Osaka Expo '70 Stadium
- J.League 1: 6th
- Emperor's Cup: Semifinals
- J.League Cup: 2nd Round
- Top goalscorer: Hiromi Kojima (9)
Home colours	Away colours

2000 Gamba Osaka season

== Competitions ==
Competitions	Position
J.League 1	6th / 16 clubs
Emperor's Cup	Semifinals
J.League Cup	2nd round

== Domestic results ==
=== J.League 1 ===
11 March 2000 1-1	Verdy Kawasaki	2-1	Gamba Osaka	Todoroki Athletics Stadium
JST (UTC+09)

18 March 2000 1-2	Gamba Osaka	1-1 (GG) (a.e.t.)	Vissel Kobe	Osaka Expo '70 Stadium
JST (UTC+09)

25 March 2000 1-3	Kyoto Purple Sanga	1-0	Gamba Osaka	Nishikyogoku Athletic Stadium
JST (UTC+09)

1 April 2000 1-4	Gamba Osaka	0-1	Shimizu S-Pulse	Osaka Expo '70 Stadium
JST (UTC+09)

5 April 2000 1-5	Kawasaki Frontale	2-2 (GG) (a.e.t.)	Gamba Osaka	Todoroki Athletics Stadium
JST (UTC+09)

8 April 2000 1-6	Gamba Osaka	1-2 (GG) (a.e.t.)	Sanfrecce Hiroshima	Osaka Expo '70 Stadium
JST (UTC+09)

15 April 2000 1-7	FC Tokyo	1-3	Gamba Osaka	Tokyo National Stadium
JST (UTC+09)

22 April 2000 1-8	Gamba Osaka	4-0	Avispa Fukuoka	Osaka Expo '70 Stadium
JST (UTC+09)

29 April 2000 1-9	Yokohama F. Marinos	4-1	Gamba Osaka	International Stadium Yokohama
JST (UTC+09)

3 May 2000 1-10	Gamba Osaka	2-1	Cerezo Osaka	Osaka Expo '70 Stadium
JST (UTC+09)

6 May 2000 1-11	JEF United Ichihara	3-0	Gamba Osaka	Ichihara Seaside Stadium
JST (UTC+09)

13 May 2000 1-12	Gamba Osaka	2-1	Júbilo Iwata	Osaka Expo '70 Stadium
JST (UTC+09)

17 May 2000 1-13	Kashima Antlers	0-1	Gamba Osaka	Kashima Soccer Stadium
JST (UTC+09)

20 May 2000 1-14	Gamba Osaka	1-2 (GG) (a.e.t.)	Nagoya Grampus Eight	Osaka Expo '70 Stadium
JST (UTC+09)

27 May 2000 1-15	Kashiwa Reysol	2-1	Gamba Osaka	Hitachi Kashiwa Soccer Stadium
JST (UTC+09)

24 June 2000 2-1	Gamba Osaka	2-1	Verdy Kawasaki	Osaka Expo '70 Stadium
JST (UTC+09)

1 July 2000 2-2	Vissel Kobe	1-3	Gamba Osaka	Kobe Universiade Memorial Stadium
JST (UTC+09)

8 July 2000 2-3	Gamba Osaka	1-0	JEF United Ichihara	Osaka Expo '70 Stadium
JST (UTC+09)

15 July 2000 2-4	Cerezo Osaka	0-1	Gamba Osaka	Osaka Nagai Stadium
JST (UTC+09)

22 July 2000 2-5	Gamba Osaka	2-1	Yokohama F. Marinos	Osaka Expo '70 Stadium
JST (UTC+09)

26 July 2000 2-6	Avispa Fukuoka	2-1	Gamba Osaka	Hakatanomori Football Stadium
JST (UTC+09)

29 July 2000 2-7	Gamba Osaka	2-1 (GG) (a.e.t.)	FC Tokyo	Osaka Expo '70 Stadium
JST (UTC+09)

5 August 2000 2-8	Shimizu S-Pulse	2-1 (GG) (a.e.t.)	Gamba Osaka	Nihondaira Sports Stadium
JST (UTC+09)

12 August 2000 2-9	Gamba Osaka	3-0	Kyoto Purple Sanga	Osaka Expo '70 Stadium
JST (UTC+09)

19 August 2000 2-10	Sanfrecce Hiroshima	2-3	Gamba Osaka	Hiroshima Big Arch
JST (UTC+09)

8 November 2000 2-11	Gamba Osaka	4-0	Kawasaki Frontale	Osaka Expo '70 Stadium
JST (UTC+09)

11 November 2000 2-12	Gamba Osaka	1-3	Kashiwa Reysol	Osaka Expo '70 Stadium
JST (UTC+09)

18 November 2000 2-13	Nagoya Grampus Eight	1-2 (GG) (a.e.t.)	Gamba Osaka	Mizuho Athletic Stadium
JST (UTC+09)

23 November 2000 2-14	Gamba Osaka	1-2	Kashima Antlers	Osaka Expo '70 Stadium
JST (UTC+09)

26 November 2000 2-15	Júbilo Iwata	4-0	Gamba Osaka	Júbilo Iwata Stadium
JST (UTC+09)

=== Emperor's Cup ===
1st Round	bye

2nd Round	bye

10 December 2000 3rd Round	Gamba Osaka	4-1	Oita Trinita	Osaka Expo '70 Stadium
JST (UTC+09)

17 December 2000 4th Round	Gamba Osaka	1-1 (GG) (a.e.t.) (10-9 p)	Kashiwa Reysol	Nagasaki Athletic Stadium
JST (UTC+09)

23 December 2000 Quarterfinals	Júbilo Iwata	0-1 (GG) (a.e.t.)	Gamba Osaka	Sendai Stadium
JST (UTC+09)

29 December 2000 Semifinals	Kashima Antlers	3-2 (GG) (a.e.t.)	Gamba Osaka	International Stadium Yokohama
JST (UTC+09)

=== J.League Cup ===
24 May 2000 1st Round-1	Consadole Sapporo	0-1	Gamba Osaka	Sapporo Atsubetsu Park Stadium
JST (UTC+09)

19 April 2000 1st Round-2	Gamba Osaka	2-1 (3-1 agg.)	Consadole Sapporo	Osaka Expo '70 Stadium
JST (UTC+09)

5 July 2000 2nd Round-1	Gamba Osaka	0-1	Júbilo Iwata	Osaka Expo '70 Stadium
JST (UTC+09)

12 July 2000 2nd Round-2	Júbilo Iwata	1-2 (GG) (a.e.t.) (2-2 agg.) (3-2 p)	Gamba Osaka	Júbilo Iwata Stadium
JST (UTC+09)

== Player statistics ==
No.	Pos.	Nat.	Player	D.o.B. (Age)	Height / Weight	J.League 1		Emperor's Cup		J.League Cup		Total	
No.	Pos.	Nat.	Player	D.o.B. (Age)	Height / Weight	Apps	Goals	Apps	Goals	Apps	Goals	Apps	Goals
1	GK	(Japan)	Hayato Okanaka	September 26, 1968 (aged 31)	cm / kg	8	0						
2	DF	(Japan)	Shin Asahina	August 20, 1976 (aged 23)	cm / kg	4	0						
3	DF	(Japan)	Takehito Suzuki	June 11, 1971 (aged 28)	cm / kg	12	0						
4	DF	(Japan)	Noritada Saneyoshi	October 19, 1972 (aged 27)	cm / kg	3	0						
5	DF	(Japan)	Tsuneyasu Miyamoto	February 7, 1977 (aged 23)	cm / kg	29	0						
6	MF	(Japan)	Junichi Inamoto	September 18, 1979 (aged 20)	cm / kg	28	4						
7	DF	(Japan)	Naoki Hiraoka	May 24, 1973 (aged 26)	cm / kg	4	0						
7	DF	(Japan)	Tomohiro Katanosaka	April 18, 1971 (aged 28)	cm / kg	0	0						
8	MF	(Japan)	Hitoshi Morishita	September 21, 1972 (aged 27)	cm / kg	26	2						
9	FW	(Brazil)	Andradina	September 13, 1974 (aged 25)	cm / kg	12	3						
9	FW	(Croatia)	Nino Bule	March 19, 1976 (aged 23)	cm / kg	13	6						
10	MF	(Brazil)	Vital	February 29, 1976 (aged 24)	cm / kg	27	7						
11	MF	(Japan)	Hiromi Kojima	December 12, 1977 (aged 22)	cm / kg	30	9						
13	DF	(Japan)	Kojiro Kaimoto	October 14, 1977 (aged 22)	cm / kg	0	0						
14	MF	(Japan)	Takayuki Yamaguchi	August 1, 1973 (aged 26)	cm / kg	23	1						
15	DF	(Japan)	Masao Kiba	September 6, 1974 (aged 25)	cm / kg	23	0						
16	MF	(Japan)	Takahiro Futagawa	June 27, 1980 (aged 19)	cm / kg	21	0						
17	DF	(Japan)	Toru Araiba	July 12, 1979 (aged 20)	cm / kg	24	7						
18	FW	(Japan)	Kota Yoshihara	February 2, 1978 (aged 22)	cm / kg	19	3						
19	FW	(Japan)	Kohei Hayashi	June 27, 1978 (aged 21)	cm / kg	0	0						
20	DF	(France)	Claude Dambury	July 30, 1971 (aged 28)	cm / kg	27	0						
21	MF	(Japan)	Yoshiki Okamura	March 21, 1977 (aged 22)	cm / kg	0	0						
22	GK	(Japan)	Naoki Matsuyo	April 9, 1974 (aged 25)	cm / kg	3	0						
23	GK	(Japan)	Ryōta Tsuzuki	April 18, 1978 (aged 21)	cm / kg	19	0						
24	FW	(Japan)	Masanobu Matsunami	November 21, 1974 (aged 25)	cm / kg	29	4						
25	FW	(Japan)	Shinichi Yamaguchi	July 29, 1976 (aged 23)	cm / kg	0	0						
26	FW	(Japan)	Satoshi Nakayama	November 7, 1981 (aged 18)	cm / kg	0	0						
27	MF	(Japan)	Hideo Hashimoto	May 21, 1979 (aged 20)	cm / kg	5	0						
28	DF	(Japan)	Koichi Hashigaito	March 30, 1982 (aged 17)	cm / kg	0	0						
29	FW	(Japan)	Masashi Oguro	May 4, 1980 (aged 19)	cm / kg	7	1						
30	GK	(Japan)	Koichi Ae	April 15, 1976 (aged 23)	cm / kg	0	0						
32	MF	(Japan)	Naohiro Tamura	July 3, 1978 (aged 21)	cm / kg	0	0						
33	DF	(Japan)	Hiroshige Yanagimoto	October 15, 1972 (aged 27)	cm / kg	14	0						
