= 2002 in Japanese football =

2002 season

Japanese football in 2002.

== National team (Men) ==
=== Results ===
2002.03.21	Japan	1–0	Ukraine	Osaka, Japan
	Toda 24'	JFA		Stadium: Osaka Nagai Stadium; Attendance: 45,214

2002.03.27	Japan	2–0	Poland	Łódź, Poland
	H. Nakata 10'; Takahara 42'	JFA

2002.04.17	Japan	1–1	Costa Rica	Kanagawa, Japan
	Myojin 70'	JFA	? (?)	Stadium: International Stadium Yokohama; Attendance: 64,783

2002.04.29	Japan	1–0	Slovakia	Tokyo, Japan
	Nishizawa 38'	JFA		Stadium: Tokyo National Stadium; Attendance: 55,144

2002.05.02	Japan	3–3	Honduras	Hyōgo, Japan
	Nakamura 26', 41'; Santos 76'	JFA	? (?) ? (?) ? (?)	Stadium: Kobe Wing Stadium; Attendance: 38,130

2002.05.14	Japan	0–3	Norway	Oslo, Norway
		JFA	? (?) ? (?) ? (?)	Attendance: 8,348

2002.05.25	Japan	1–1	Sweden	Tokyo, Japan
	63' (o.g.)	JFA	? (?)	Stadium: Tokyo National Stadium; Attendance: 55,418

2002.06.04	Japan	2–2	Belgium	Saitama, Japan
	Suzuki 59'; Inamoto 67'	JFA	Wilmots 57'; Van der Heyden 75'	Stadium: Saitama Stadium 2002; Attendance: 55,256

2002.06.09	Japan	1–0	Russia	Kanagawa, Japan
	Inamoto 51'	JFA		Stadium: International Stadium Yokohama; Attendance: 66,108

2002.06.14	Japan	2–0	Tunisia	Osaka, Japan
	Morishima 48'; H. Nakata 75'	JFA		Stadium: Osaka Nagai Stadium; Attendance: 45,213

2002.06.18	Japan	0–1	Turkey	Miyagi, Japan
		JFA	Davala 12'	Stadium: Miyagi Stadium; Attendance: 45,666

2002.10.16	Japan	1–1	Jamaica	Tokyo, Japan
	Ono 7'	JFA	? (?)	Stadium: Tokyo National Stadium; Attendance: 55,437

2002.11.20	Japan	0–2	Argentina	Saitama, Japan
		JFA	? (?) ? (?)	Stadium: Saitama Stadium 2002; Attendance: 61,816

=== Players statistics ===
Player	-2001	03.21	03.27	04.17	04.29	05.02	05.14	05.25	06.04	06.09	06.14	06.18	10.16	11.20	2002	Total
Hiroaki Morishima	56(11)	O	-	O	O	O	-	O	O	-	O(1)	O	-	-	8(1)	64(12)
Yoshikatsu Kawaguchi	50(0)	-	O	-	-	-	O	-	-	-	-	-	-	-	2(0)	52(0)
Masashi Nakayama	47(21)	-	-	-	-	-	-	O	-	O	-	-	-	O	3(0)	50(21)
Hidetoshi Nakata	40(7)	-	O(1)	-	-	-	O	O	O	O	O(1)	O	O	-	8(2)	48(9)
Yutaka Akita	37(3)	-	-	-	-	-	-	O	-	-	-	-	O	O	3(0)	40(3)
Toshihiro Hattori	35(2)	-	-	O	-	-	O	O	-	O	-	-	O	-	5(0)	40(2)
Ryuzo Morioka	32(0)	-	-	-	-	-	-	O	O	-	-	-	-	-	2(0)	34(0)
Akira Narahashi	32(0)	-	-	-	-	-	-	-	-	-	-	-	O	O	2(0)	34(0)
Junichi Inamoto	25(1)	-	O	-	O	O	O	O	O(1)	O(1)	O	O	O	-	10(2)	35(3)
Akinori Nishizawa	24(9)	O	-	O	O(1)	O	-	-	-	-	-	O	-	-	5(1)	29(10)
Shinji Ono	24(2)	-	O	-	-	-	O	O	O	O	O	O	O(1)	-	8(1)	32(3)
Naoki Matsuda	24(0)	O	O	O	O	O	-	O	O	O	O	O	O	O	12(0)	36(0)
Atsushi Yanagisawa	22(9)	O	-	O	O	-	O	O	O	O	O	-	O	-	9(0)	31(9)
Koji Nakata	20(0)	O	O	O	O	O	O	O	O	O	O	O	O	O	13(0)	33(0)
Shunsuke Nakamura	17(3)	O	-	O	O	O(2)	-	-	-	-	-	-	O	O	6(2)	23(5)
Tomokazu Myojin	16(2)	O	O	O(1)	O	O	O	O	-	O	O	O	-	-	10(1)	26(3)
Naohiro Takahara	15(8)	O	O(1)	-	-	-	-	-	-	-	-	-	O	O	4(1)	19(9)
Seigo Narazaki	15(0)	O	-	O	-	O	-	O	O	O	O	O	O	O	10(0)	25(0)
Eisuke Nakanishi	13(0)	-	-	-	-	-	-	-	-	-	-	-	-	O	1(0)	14(0)
Takayuki Suzuki	10(3)	O	O	O	O	O	O	O	O(1)	O	O	O	O	O	13(1)	23(4)
Kazuyuki Toda	10(0)	O(1)	O	O	O	-	O	O	O	O	O	O	-	-	10(1)	20(1)
Yasuhiro Hato	10(0)	O	O	O	O	O	-	-	-	-	-	-	-	-	5(0)	15(0)
Yuji Nakazawa	9(2)	-	-	-	-	-	O	-	-	-	-	-	-	-	1(0)	10(2)
Tatsuhiko Kubo	9(0)	-	O	O	O	O	O	-	-	-	-	-	-	-	5(0)	14(0)
Tsuneyasu Miyamoto	5(0)	O	O	O	O	O	O	O	O	O	O	O	-	-	11(0)	16(0)
Takashi Fukunishi	5(0)	O	O	O	O	O	O	O	-	O	-	-	O	O	10(0)	15(0)
Daisuke Ichikawa	1(0)	O	O	O	-	O	O	O	O	-	O	O	-	-	9(0)	10(0)
Hitoshi Sogahata	1(0)	-	-	-	O	-	-	-	-	-	-	-	-	-	1(0)	2(0)
Alessandro Santos	0(0)	O	-	O	O	O(1)	O	O	O	-	-	O	-	O	9(1)	9(1)
Mitsuo Ogasawara	0(0)	O	-	O	O	O	O	O	-	-	O	-	-	O	8(0)	8(0)
Nobuhisa Yamada	0(0)	-	-	-	-	-	-	-	-	-	-	-	-	O	1(0)	1(0)
Yasuhito Endō	0(0)	-	-	-	-	-	-	-	-	-	-	-	-	O	1(0)	1(0)

== National team (Women) ==
=== Results ===
2002.04.03	Japan	0–1	France	France
			? (?)

2002.04.06	Japan	1–1	Australia	France
	Kasajima (?)		? (?)

2002.04.09	Japan	3–2	Canada	France
	Yanagita (?); Sawa (?)		? (?) ? (?)

2002.08.27	Japan	0–4	China	China
			? (?) ? (?) ? (?) ? (?)

2002.08.29	Japan	0–1	Russia	China
			? (?)

2002.08.31	Japan	0–0	South Korea	China

2002.10.02	Japan	0–1	North Korea	South Korea
			? (?)

2002.10.04	Japan	3–0	Vietnam	South Korea
	Otani (?); Sawa (?)

2002.10.07	Japan	1–0	South Korea	South Korea
	Sawa (?)

2002.10.09	Japan	2–2	China	South Korea
	Miyamoto (?); Sawa (?)		? (?) ? (?)

2002.10.11	Japan	2–0	Chinese Taipei	South Korea
	Kobayashi (?); Miyazaki (?)

=== Players statistics ===
Player	-2001	04.03	04.06	04.09	08.27	08.29	08.31	10.02	10.04	10.07	10.09	10.11	2002	Total
Homare Sawa	62(32)	O	O	O(2)	-	-	-	O	O(1)	O(1)	O(1)	O	8(5)	70(37)
Yumi Obe	56(6)	O	O	O	O	-	O	O	O	O	O	O	10(0)	66(6)
Hiromi Isozaki	38(3)	O	O	O	O	O	O	-	-	-	-	-	6(0)	44(3)
Nozomi Yamago	38(0)	O	-	O	O	O	-	O	-	O	O	O	8(0)	46(0)
Mito Isaka	37(15)	O	O	-	O	O	O	-	O	O	O	O	9(0)	46(15)
Tomoe Sakai	34(0)	O	-	O	O	O	O	O	-	O	O	O	9(0)	43(0)
Tomomi Miyamoto	30(5)	-	-	-	O	O	O	O	O	O	O(1)	-	7(1)	37(6)
Yasuyo Yamagishi	25(5)	O	O	O	O	O	O	O	O	O	O	O	11(0)	36(5)
Ayumi Hara	25(1)	-	-	-	O	-	O	-	-	-	-	-	2(0)	27(1)
Yayoi Kobayashi	21(4)	O	O	O	O	O	O	O	O	O	O	O(1)	11(1)	32(5)
Yoshie Kasajima	19(3)	-	O(1)	O	O	O	-	O	-	-	-	-	5(1)	24(4)
Mai Nakachi	19(0)	O	-	O	O	-	O	-	O	-	-	-	5(0)	24(0)
Tomomi Fujimura	17(1)	O	O	O	-	-	-	-	-	-	-	-	3(0)	20(1)
Mio Otani	16(9)	O	O	-	O	O	O	O	O(2)	O	O	O	10(2)	26(11)
Shiho Onodera	16(0)	-	O	-	-	-	O	-	-	-	-	-	2(0)	18(0)
Miyuki Yanagita	14(2)	-	O	O(1)	O	O	O	O	O	O	O	O	10(1)	24(3)
Harue Sato	13(4)	-	O	O	O	-	O	-	-	-	-	-	4(0)	17(4)
Naoko Kawakami	10(0)	O	O	-	O	O	O	O	O	O	O	O	10(0)	20(0)
Kanako Ito	6(2)	-	-	-	-	-	-	O	O	-	-	O	3(0)	9(2)
Kozue Ando	6(0)	O	O	-	O	O	O	-	-	-	-	-	5(0)	11(0)
Yuka Miyazaki	5(0)	-	-	-	-	-	-	O	O	O	O	O(1)	5(1)	10(1)
Noriko Baba	4(0)	O	-	-	-	-	-	-	-	-	-	-	1(0)	5(0)
Mai Aizawa	3(4)	-	-	-	-	O	-	-	-	-	-	O	2(0)	5(4)
Karina Maruyama	0(0)	-	-	-	-	-	-	O	O	O	O	O	5(0)	5(0)
Miho Fukumoto	0(0)	-	-	-	-	-	-	-	O	-	-	-	1(0)	1(0)

== Births ==
- 13 August: Satoshi Tanaka
