= Hideo Hashimoto =

Japanese footballer (born 1979)

Hideo Hashimoto 橋本 英郎
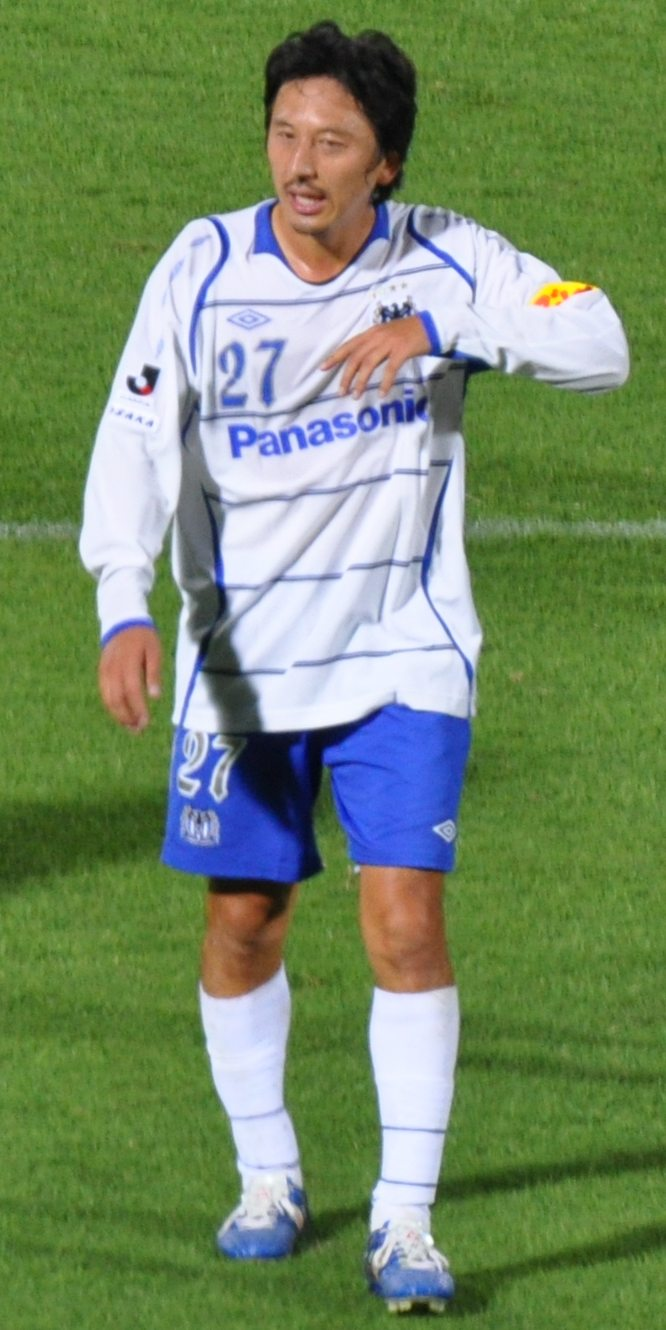
- Hashimoto with Gamba Osaka in 2010

Personal information
- Full name: Hideo Hashimoto
- Date of birth: 21 May 1979 (age 47)
- Place of birth: Osaka, Japan
- Height: 1.73 m (5 ft 8 in)
- Position: Midfielder

Youth career
- 1992–1997: Gamba Osaka

Senior career*
Years	Team	Apps	(Gls)
1998–2011	Gamba Osaka	287	(18)
2012–2014	Vissel Kobe	86	(2)
2015–2016	Cerezo Osaka	16	(0)
2016	→ Cerezo Osaka U-23 (loan)	6	(1)
2016	AC Nagano Parceiro	13	(0)
2017–2018	Tokyo Verdy	30	(0)
2019–2021	FC Imabari	65	(2)
2022	Ococias Kyoto	13	(0)

International career
2007–2010	Japan	15	(0)
Medal record
Gamba Osaka
Winner	AFC Champions League	2008
Winner	J1 League	2005
Runner-up	J1 League	2010
Winner	J.League Cup	2007
Runner-up	J.League Cup	2005
Winner	Emperor's Cup	2008
Winner	Emperor's Cup	2009
Runner-up	Emperor's Cup	2006
- * Club domestic league appearances and goals as of 19 January 2023

Hideo Hashimoto (橋本 英郎, Hashimoto Hideo; born 21 May 1979) is a Japanese former professional footballer who played as a midfielder.

== Club career ==
Hashimoto was born in Osaka on 21 May 1979. He joined J1 League club Gamba Osaka from youth team in 1998. He played many matches as right-side midfielder and defensive midfielder from 2001. He became a regular player as defensive midfielder from 2003 and one of the central player under manager Akira Nishino. In 2005, Gamba won the champions in J1 League first time in the club history. After that, Gamba won the many title, 2007 J.League Cup, 2008 and 2009 Emperor's Cup. In Asia, Gamba also won the champions in 2008 AFC Champions League and the 3rd place in 2008 Club World Cup. This is the golden era in the club history. However he could hardly play in the match for injury in 2011 and left the club end of 2011 season.

In 2012, Hashimoto moved to Vissel Kobe. Although he played many matches, the club finished at the 16th place of 18 clubs in 2012 season and was relegated to J2 League. In 2013 season, the club won the 2nd place and returned to J1. He played many matches until 2014 and left the club end of 2014 season. In 2015, he moved to J2 club Cerezo Osaka. However he could not play many matches. In July 2016, he moved to J3 League club AC Nagano Parceiro and played many matches. In 2017, he moved to J2 club Tokyo Verdy.

On 10 January 2019, Hashimoto joined Japan Football League club FC Imabari.

== National team career ==
His first cap as a full international came when he substituted Keita Suzuki on 1 June 2007 in a friendly against Montenegro. He was a member of the Japan team for 2007 Asian Cup and played one game as a substitute. He played 15 games for Japan until 2010.

== Club statistics ==
As of 1 January 2020.

Club performance			League		Cup		League Cup		Continental		Total	
Season	Club	League	Apps	Goals	Apps	Goals	Apps	Goals	Apps	Goals	Apps	Goals
Japan			League		Emperor's Cup		J.League Cup		Asia		Total	
1998	Gamba Osaka	J1 League	0	0	0	0	0	0	-		0	0
1999	Gamba Osaka	J1 League	4	0	1	0	1	1	-		6	1
2000	Gamba Osaka	J1 League	5	0	4	1	0	0	-		9	1
2001	Gamba Osaka	J1 League	17	0	3	0	2	0	-		22	0
2002	Gamba Osaka	J1 League	18	0	2	1	7	0	-		27	1
2003	Gamba Osaka	J1 League	23	1	1	0	4	0	-		28	1
2004	Gamba Osaka	J1 League	27	1	4	0	7	0	-		38	1
2005	Gamba Osaka	J1 League	33	1	3	0	10	1	-		46	2
2006	Gamba Osaka	J1 League	28	0	4	0	2	0	6	1	40	1
2007	Gamba Osaka	J1 League	34	3	4	0	9	0	-		47	3
2008	Gamba Osaka	J1 League	34	0	4	0	4	0	*14	*1	*56	*1
2009	Gamba Osaka	J1 League	31	4	5	0	2	0	6	0	44	4
2010	Gamba Osaka	J1 League	29	8	3	0	1	0	*5	0	38	8
2011	Gamba Osaka	J1 League	4	0	1	0	2	0	0	0	7	0
Total			287	18	39	2	51	2	31	2	408	24
2012	Vissel Kobe	J1 League	24	1	0	0	3	0	-		27	1
2013	Vissel Kobe	J2 League	34	1	1	0	-		-		35	1
2014	Vissel Kobe	J1 League	28	0	1	0	8	1	-		37	1
Total			86	2	2	0	11	1	-		99	3
2015	Cerezo Osaka	J2 League	14	0	0	0	-		-		14	0
2016	Cerezo Osaka	J2 League	2	0	0	0	-		-		2	0
Total			16	0	0	0	-		-		16	0
2016	Cerezo Osaka U-23	J3 League	6	1	-		-		-		6	1
Total			6	1	-		-		-		6	1
2016	Nagano Parceiro	J3 League	13	0	3	0	-		-		16	0
Total			13	0	3	0	-		-		16	0
2017	Tokyo Verdy	J2 League	26	0	1	0	-		-		27	0
2018	Tokyo Verdy	J2 League	4	0	3	0	-		-		7	0
Total			30	0	4	0	-		-		34	0
2019	FC Imabari	JFL	22	1	-		-		-		22	1
Total			22	1	-		-		-		22	1
Career total			460	22	48	2	62	3	*31	*2	601	29

- Includes FIFA Club World Cup, Fuji Xerox Super Cup

=== FIFA Club World Cup career statistics ===
Season	Team	Apps	Goals
2008	Gamba Osaka	3	1

== National team statistics ==
Japan national team
Year	Apps	Goals
2007	4	0
2008	2	0
2009	7	0
2010	2	0
Total	15	0

== Team honors ==
- AFC Champions League (1): 2008
- J1 League (2): 2005
- Emperor's Cup (2): 2008, 2009
- J.League Cup (1): 2007
- Japanese Super Cup (1): 2007
