= Koji Yoshinari =

Japanese footballer

Koji Yoshinari 吉成 浩司
Personal information
- Full name: Koji Yoshinari
- Date of birth: May 19, 1974 (age 52)
- Place of birth: Tokushima, Japan
- Height: 1.74 m (5 ft 8 1/2 in)
- Position: Midfielder

Youth career
- 1990–1992: Tokushima High School
- 1993–1996: University of Tsukuba

Senior career*
Years	Team	Apps	(Gls)
1997	Gamba Osaka	1	(0)
1998–2003	Otsuka Pharmaceutical	130	(14)
Total		131	(14)
- * Club domestic league appearances and goals

Koji Yoshinari (吉成 浩司, Yoshinari Koji; born May 19, 1974) is a former Japanese football player.

== Playing career ==
Yoshinari was born in Tokushima Prefecture on May 19, 1974. After graduating from University of Tsukuba, he joined J1 League club Gamba Osaka in 1997. On July 19, he debuted against JEF United Ichihara in J1 League. However he could only play this match. In 1998, he moved to his local club Otsuka Pharmaceutical. He played many matches as defensive midfielder. In 2003, the club won the champions in Japan Football League. He was also selected MVP award. He retired end of 2003 season.

== Club statistics ==
Club performance			League		Cup		League Cup		Total	
Season	Club	League	Apps	Goals	Apps	Goals	Apps	Goals	Apps	Goals
Japan			League		Emperor's Cup		J.League Cup		Total	
1997	Gamba Osaka	J1 League	1	0	0	0	0	0	1	0
1998	Otsuka Pharmaceutical	Football League	28	3	3	0	-		31	3
1999	Otsuka Pharmaceutical	Football League	12	0	2	0	-		14	0
2000	Otsuka Pharmaceutical	Football League	20	1	3	1	-		23	2
2001	Otsuka Pharmaceutical	Football League	26	1	2	0	-		28	1
2002	Otsuka Pharmaceutical	Football League	15	2	3	0	-		18	2
2003	Otsuka Pharmaceutical	Football League	29	7	2	1	-		31	8
Total			131	14	15	2	0	0	146	16
