= José Reginaldo Vital =

Brazilian footballer

Vital
Personal information
- Full name: Jose Reginaldo Vital
- Date of birth: 29 February 1976 (age 50)
- Place of birth: Paraná, Brazil
- Height: 1.75 m (5 ft 9 in)
- Position: Midfielder

Senior career*
Years	Team	Apps	(Gls)
1996–1999	Paraná		
2000–2002	Gamba Osaka		
2002	Atlético Paranaense		
2003	Ponte Preta		
2003	Consadole Sapporo		
2004–2005	Coritiba		
- * Club domestic league appearances and goals

Jose Reginaldo Vital (born 29 February 1976) is a former Brazilian football player.

== Club statistics ==
Club performance			League		Cup		League Cup		Total	
Season	Club	League	Apps	Goals	Apps	Goals	Apps	Goals	Apps	Goals
Brazil			League		Copa do Brasil		League Cup		Total	
1996	Paraná	Série A	9	0					9	0
1997	Paraná	Série A	12	1					12	1
1998	Paraná	Série A	21	2					21	2
1999	Paraná	Série A	19	2					19	2
Japan			League		Emperor's Cup		J.League Cup		Total	
2000	Gamba Osaka	J1 League	27	7	3	0	4	0	34	7
2001	Gamba Osaka	J1 League	20	6	0	0	4	2	24	8
2002	Gamba Osaka	J1 League	0	0	0	0	0	0	0	0
Brazil			League		Copa do Brasil		League Cup		Total	
2002	Atlético Paranaense	Série A	5	0					5	0
2003	Ponte Preta	Série A	2	0					2	0
Japan			League		Emperor's Cup		J.League Cup		Total	
2003	Consadole Sapporo	J2 League	22	5	0	0	-		22	5
Brazil			League		Copa do Brasil		League Cup		Total	
2004	Coritiba	Série A	13	1					13	1
2005	Coritiba	Série A	5	0					5	0
Country	Brazil		86	6					86	6
Country	Japan		69	18	3	0	8	2	80	20
Total			155	24	3	0	8	2	166	26
