= Masao Kiba =

Japanese footballer

Masao Kiba 木場 昌雄
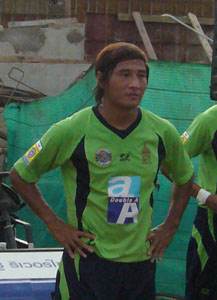

Personal information
- Full name: Masao Kiba
- Date of birth: September 6, 1974 (age 52)
- Place of birth: Minamiawaji, Hyogo, Japan
- Height: 1.77 m (5 ft 9 1/2 in)
- Position: Defender

Youth career
- 1990–1992: Takigawa Daini High School

Senior career*
Years	Team	Apps	(Gls)
1993–2004	Gamba Osaka	223	(1)
2005	Avispa Fukuoka	0	(0)
2006–2007	Valiente Toyama	19	(0)
2007	FC Mi-O Biwako Kusatsu	3	(0)
2008–2010	Customs Department	64	(0)
Total		309	(1)
- * Club domestic league appearances and goals

Masao Kiba (木場 昌雄, Kiba Masao; born September 6, 1974) is a former Japanese football player.

== Playing career ==
Kiba was born in Minamiawaji on September 6, 1974. After graduating from high school, he joined Gamba Osaka in 1993. He debuted in 1994 and he played in many matches, mainly as a center back and defensive midfielder for a long time. He also served as captain from 2001 to 2003. However he could hardly play in 2004 and he moved to Avispa Fukuoka in 2005. He did not play at all there and he left the club in July 2005. In 2006, he joined the Regional Leagues club Valiente Toyama and he played in many matches. In June 2007, he moved to the Regional Leagues club FC Mi-O Biwako Kusatsu. Although the club was promoted to the Japan Football League, he did not play in any matches. In 2008, he moved to Thailand and joined the Customs Department. He played as a regular played for three seasons and he retired at the end of the 2010 season.

== Club statistics ==
Club performance			League		Cup		League Cup		Total	
Season	Club	League	Apps	Goals	Apps	Goals	Apps	Goals	Apps	Goals
Japan			League		Emperor's Cup		J.League Cup		Total	
1993	Gamba Osaka	J1 League	0	0	0	0	0	0	0	0
1994	Gamba Osaka	J1 League	4	0	0	0	0	0	4	0
1995	Gamba Osaka	J1 League	28	0	4	0	-		32	0
1996	Gamba Osaka	J1 League	22	1	3	0	13	0	38	1
1997	Gamba Osaka	J1 League	9	0	3	0	5	0	17	0
1998	Gamba Osaka	J1 League	21	0	1	0	0	0	22	0
1999	Gamba Osaka	J1 League	26	0	2	0	3	0	31	0
2000	Gamba Osaka	J1 League	23	0	4	0	2	0	29	0
2001	Gamba Osaka	J1 League	30	0	2	0	2	0	34	0
2002	Gamba Osaka	J1 League	30	0	2	0	8	0	40	0
2003	Gamba Osaka	J1 League	28	0	2	0	4	0	34	0
2004	Gamba Osaka	J1 League	2	0	1	0	0	0	3	0
2005	Avispa Fukuoka	J2 League	0	0	0	0	-		0	0
2006	Valiente Toyama	Regional Leagues	13	0	-		-		13	0
2007	Valiente Toyama	Regional Leagues	6	0	-		-		6	0
2007	FC Mi-O Biwako Kusatsu	Regional Leagues	3	0	0	0	-		3	0
2008	Customs Department	Premier League	11	0	-		0	0	11	0
2009	Customs Department	Division 1	24	0	-		1	0	25	0
2010	Customs Department	Division 1	29	0	-		1	0	30	0
Total			309	1	24	0	39	0	372	1
