= Daiju Matsumoto =

Japanese footballer

Daiju Matsumoto 松本 大樹
Personal information
- Full name: Daiju Matsumoto
- Date of birth: December 9, 1977 (age 48)
- Place of birth: Gunma, Japan
- Height: 1.78 m (5 ft 10 in)
- Position: Defender

Youth career
- 1993–1995: Maebashi Commercial High School

Senior career*
Years	Team	Apps	(Gls)
1996–1999	Gamba Osaka	13	(0)
2000–2004	Omiya Ardija	61	(1)
Total		74	(1)
- * Club domestic league appearances and goals

Daiju Matsumoto (松本 大樹, Matsumoto Daiju; born December 9, 1977) is a former Japanese football player.

== Playing career ==
Matsumoto was born in Gunma Prefecture on December 9, 1977. After graduating from high school, he joined J1 League club Gamba Osaka in 1996. Although he debuted in 1997, he could not play many matches until 1999. In 2000, he moved to J2 League club Omiya Ardija. Although he could not play many matches initially, his opportunity to play increased and he became a regular player in 2002. However his opportunities decreased and he was hardly included in any team for matches in 2004. His club was promoted to J1 from 2005, but he retired at the end of the 2004 season.

== Club statistics ==
Club performance			League		Cup		League Cup		Total	
Season	Club	League	Apps	Goals	Apps	Goals	Apps	Goals	Apps	Goals
Japan			League		Emperor's Cup		J.League Cup		Total	
1996	Gamba Osaka	J1 League	0	0	0	0	0	0	0	0
1997	Gamba Osaka	J1 League	6	0	1	0	0	0	7	0
1998	Gamba Osaka	J1 League	7	0	0	0	2	0	9	0
1999	Gamba Osaka	J1 League	0	0	0	0	0	0	0	0
2000	Omiya Ardija	J2 League	3	0	0	0	1	0	4	0
2001	Omiya Ardija	J2 League	12	0	0	0	2	0	14	0
2002	Omiya Ardija	J2 League	33	1	3	0	-		36	1
2003	Omiya Ardija	J2 League	12	0	0	0	-		12	0
2004	Omiya Ardija	J2 League	1	0	1	0	-		2	0
Career total			74	1	5	0	5	0	84	1
