= Boban Babunski =

Macedonian footballer (born 1968)

Personal information
- Date of birth: 5 May 1968 (age 58)
- Place of birth: Skopje, SR Macedonia, SFR Yugoslavia
- Height: 1.85 m (6 ft 1 in)
- Position: Centre back

Senior career*
Years	Team	Apps	(Gls)
1986–1993	Vardar	141	(14)
1993–1994	CSKA Sofia	40	(4)
1994–1996	Lleida	63	(3)
1996–1998	Gamba Osaka	38	(6)
1998–1999	AEK Athens	8	(0)
1999–2000	Logroñés	34	(0)
2000	Sint-Truiden	1	(0)
2000	Chemnitzer FC	8	(1)
2001	Rabotnichki	3	(1)
2008	Kozhuf	1	(0)
Total		337	(29)

International career
1991	Yugoslavia	2	(0)
1993–2000	Macedonia	23	(1)

Managerial career
- 2002–2003: Macedonia (assistant)
- 2005: Macedonia (assistant)
- 2005–2006: Macedonia (interim)
- 2008–2009: Rabotnichki (coach)
- 2009–2014: Macedonia U21 (coach)
- 2011: Macedonia (caretaker)
- 2011–2012: Macedonia (assistant)
- 2018: FK Vardar
- 2022: Pobeda
- 2023: Pelister
- 2024-: KF Besa Dobërdoll
Medal record
Representing Yugoslavia
Silver medal – second place	UEFA U-21 Euro	1990
- * Club domestic league appearances and goals

Boban Babunski (Macedonian: Бобан Бабунски; born 5 May 1968) is a Macedonian retired footballer who played as a central defender, and a coach.

== Club career ==
Babunski was born in Skopje, SR Macedonia, Socialist Federal Republic of Yugoslavia. On the club level he started playing with hometown's FK Vardar, then spent two seasons in Bulgaria with CSKA Sofia to become of the first Macedonians to compete in the A Football Group. After two solid years in the Spanish second division with Lleida he played the same time in Japan, at Gamba Osaka.

On 31 July 1998 Babunski was transferred to the Greek side, AEK Athens for a fee of 330 million drachmas. He failed to establish himself in the squad and on 28 July 1999 he was transferred to Logroñés.

Babunski retired professionally in 2001 at the age of 33, after stints with, Sint-Truiden and Chemnitzer FC – he left Germany in December 2000, signing with native FK Rabotnichki – the second and the last teams two also in the respective countries' second level.

== International career ==
Babunski was capped two times for Yugoslavia in 1991. Subsequently, during seven years, he played 23 matches and scored once for the newly formed Macedonia.

== Managerial career ==
Babunski began his coaching career as assistant in the Macedonian national side, under Slobodan Santrač. When the latter resigned on 23 August 2005 he was appointed interim manager but, on 17 February of the following year, Srečko Katanec took over the job on a permanent basis.

On 23 July 2009, Babunski was signed as head coach of Macedonian First Football League champions Rabotnichki, also from Skopje, winning the domestic cup in his sole season. Four years later he returned to the national team.

== Personal life ==
Babunski's sons, David and Dorian, are also footballers. The former played youth football with FC Barcelona, whilst the latter did the same at Real Madrid. Babunski's great-grandfather was Jovan Babunski, a Serbian Chetnik vojvoda.

== Career statistics ==
=== Club ===
Appearances and goals by club, season and competition
Club	Season	League			National cup (Note: Includes Yugoslav Cup, Bulgarian Cup, Copa del Rey, Emperor's Cup, Greek Cup, Belgian Cup, DFB-Pokal, Macedonian Cup.)		League cup (Note: Includes J.League Cup, Greek League Cup.)		Total	
Club	Season	Division	Apps	Goals	Apps	Goals	Apps	Goals	Apps	Goals
FK Vardar	1985–86	First League	6	0					6	0
FK Vardar	1986–87	First League	19	0					19	0
FK Vardar	1987–88	First League	23	1					23	1
FK Vardar	1988–89	First League	14	0					14	0
FK Vardar	1989–90	First League	15	1					15	1
FK Vardar	1990–91	Second League	38	5					38	5
FK Vardar	1991–92	First League	26	7					26	7
FK Vardar	Total		141	14					141	14
CSKA Sofia	1992–93	A Football Group	22	2					22	2
CSKA Sofia	1993–94	A Football Group	18	2					18	2
CSKA Sofia	Total		40	4					40	4
Lleida	1994–95	Segunda División	31	1					31	1
Lleida	1995–96	Segunda División	31	1					31	1
Lleida	Spain		62	2					62	2
Gamba Osaka	1996	J1 League	14	1	4	0	3	0	21	1
Gamba Osaka	1997	J1 League	23	5	2	1	5	1	30	7
Gamba Osaka	1998	J1 League	1	0	0	0	0	0	1	0
Gamba Osaka	Total		38	6	6	1	8	1	52	8
AEK Athens	1998–99	Super League Greece	8	0					8	0
Logroñés	1999–2000	Segunda División	33	0					33	0
Sint-Truiden	1999–2000	Belgian Pro League	1	0					1	0
Chemnitzer FC	2000–01	2. Bundesliga	8	1					8	1
Rabotnichki	2000–01	Macedonian First Football League	3	1					3	1
Career total			306	25	6	1	8	1	348	31

=== International ===
Appearances and goals by national team and year
National team	Year	Apps	Goals
Yugoslavia	1991	2	0
Total		2	0
Macedonia	1993	1	0
Macedonia	1994	3	0
Macedonia	1995	4	0
Macedonia	1996	2	1
Macedonia	1997	2	0
Macedonia	1998	1	0
Macedonia	1999	6	0
Macedonia	2000	4	0
Total		23	1
