= Kohei Hayashi =

Japanese footballer

Kohei Hayashi 林 晃平
Personal information
- Full name: Kohei Hayashi
- Date of birth: June 27, 1978 (age 48)
- Place of birth: Hofu, Japan
- Height: 1.75 m (5 ft 9 in)
- Position: Forward

Youth career
- 1994–1996: Takigawa Daini High School

Senior career*
Years	Team	Apps	(Gls)
1997–2000	Gamba Osaka	9	(0)
1999	→ Consadole Sapporo (loan)	2	(0)
2001–2003	Kawasaki Frontale	52	(10)
2004–2007	Montedio Yamagata	127	(19)
Total		190	(29)
- * Club domestic league appearances and goals

Kohei Hayashi (林 晃平, Hayashi Kōhei; born June 27, 1978) is a former Japanese football player.

== Playing career ==
Hayashi was born in Hofu on June 27, 1978. After graduating from high school, he joined J1 League club Gamba Osaka in 1997. However he could hardly play in the match. In September 1999, he moved to J2 League club Consadole Sapporo. However he could hardly play in the match. Although he returned to Gamba in 2000, he could not play at all in the match. In 2001, he moved to J2 club Kawasaki Frontale. Although he played many matches in 2001, his opportunity to play decreased from 2002. In 2004, he moved to J2 club Montedio Yamagata. He played many matches as substitute forward in 4 seasons. He retired end of 2007 season.

== Career statistics ==
Appearances and goals by club, season and competition
Club	Season	League			Emperor's Cup		J.League Cup		Total	
Club	Season	Division	Apps	Goals	Apps	Goals	Apps	Goals	Apps	Goals
Gamba Osaka	1997	J1 League	1	0	0	0	0	0	1	0
Gamba Osaka	1998	J1 League	7	0	0	0	0	0	7	0
Gamba Osaka	1999	J1 League	1	0	0	0	0	0	1	0
Consadole Sapporo	1999	J2 League	2	0	0	0	0	0	2	0
Gamba Osaka	2000	J1 League	0	0	0	0	0	0	0	0
Kawasaki Frontale	2001	J2 League	39	9	0	0	1	0	40	9
Kawasaki Frontale	2002	J2 League	11	1	4	0	—		15	1
Kawasaki Frontale	2003	J2 League	2	0	3	2	—		5	2
Montedio Yamagata	2004	J2 League	40	4	2	0	—		42	4
Montedio Yamagata	2005	J2 League	34	7	2	1	—		36	8
Montedio Yamagata	2006	J2 League	34	6	0	0	—		34	6
Montedio Yamagata	2007	J2 League	19	2	0	0	—		19	2
Career total			190	29	11	3	1	0	202	32
