= Yuzo Funakoshi =

Japanese footballer

Yuzo Funakoshi 船越 優蔵
Personal information
- Date of birth: June 12, 1977 (age 49)
- Place of birth: Kobe, Japan
- Height: 1.94 m (6 ft 4 1/2 in)
- Position: Forward

Team information
- Current team: Albirex Niigata (manager)

Youth career
- 1993–1995: Kunimi High School

Senior career*
Years	Team	Apps	(Gls)
1996–1998	Gamba Osaka	3	(0)
1996–1997	→ Telstar (loan)	18	(2)
1999–2000	Shonan Bellmare	20	(1)
2001	Oita Trinita	27	(9)
2002–2006	Albirex Niigata	71	(12)
2007–2009	Tokyo Verdy	44	(9)
2010	SC Sagamihara		
Total		183	(33)

International career
1993	Japan U17	4	(1)

Managerial career
- 2013–2015: Thespakusatsu Gunma (assistant)
- 2022–2023: Japan U19 (assistant)
- 2023: Japan U18
- 2024–2025: Japan U20
- 2026–: Albirex Niigata
- * Club domestic league appearances and goals

Yuzo Funakoshi (船越 優蔵, Funakoshi Yuzo; born June 12, 1977) is a Japanese football manager and former footballer who is manager of J2 League club Albirex Niigata.

== Club career ==
Funakoshi was born in Kobe on June 12, 1977. After graduating from high school, he joined Gamba Osaka in 1996. He moved to Eerste Divisie club Telstar on loan in 1996. Although he returned to Gamba in 1997, he could hardly play in the match and moved to Bellmare Hiratsuka (later Shonan Bellmare) in 1999 and Oita Trinita in 2001. At Trinita, he played many matches. He moved to Albirex Niigata in 2002. Although he played many matches until 2003, he could hardly play in the match from 2004. He moved to Tokyo Verdy in 2007 and played until 2009. He played for SC Sagamihara in 2010 and retired at the end of the 2010 season.

== International career ==
In August 1993, Funakoshi was selected in the Japan U17 national team for the 1993 U-17 World Championship. He played full-time in all 4 matches and scored a goal against Mexico.

== Club statistics ==
Club	Season	League		Emperor's Cup		J.League Cup		Total	
Club	Season	Apps	Goals	Apps	Goals	Apps	Goals	Apps	Goals
Gamba Osaka	1996	0	0	0	0	0	0	0	0
Gamba Osaka	1997	2	0	3	1	0	0	5	1
Gamba Osaka	1998	1	0	0	0	1	1	2	1
Bellmare Hiratsuka	1999	12	1	0	0	2	0	14	1
Shonan Bellmare	2000	8	0	0	0	1	0	9	0
Oita Trinita	2001	27	9	3	0	0	0	30	9
Albirex Niigata	2002	34	7	0	0	–		34	7
Albirex Niigata	2003	22	4	3	1	–		25	5
Albirex Niigata	2004	4	0	1	0	3	0	8	0
Albirex Niigata	2005	7	1	0	0	2	0	9	1
Albirex Niigata	2006	4	0	0	0	0	0	4	0
Tokyo Verdy	2007	26	8	1	0	–		27	8
Tokyo Verdy	2008	7	1	1	0	2	0	10	1
Tokyo Verdy	2009	11	0	1	0	–		12	0
Total		165	31	13	2	11	1	189	34
