= Hitoshi Morishita (footballer, born 1972) =

Japanese footballer and manager

Hitoshi Morishita 森下 仁志
Personal information
- Full name: Hitoshi Morishita
- Date of birth: September 21, 1972 (age 54)
- Place of birth: Kainan, Wakayama, Japan
- Height: 1.73 m (5 ft 8 in)
- Position: Midfielder

Team information
- Current team: Tokyo Verdy (assistant manager)

Youth career
- 1988–1990: Teikyo High School
- 1991–1994: Juntendo University

Senior career*
Years	Team	Apps	(Gls)
1995–2001	Gamba Osaka	151	(7)
2001–2003	Consadole Sapporo	79	(3)
2004–2005	Júbilo Iwata	9	(0)
Total		239	(10)

Managerial career
- 2012–2013: Júbilo Iwata
- 2014: Kyoto Sanga FC (caretaker)
- 2015: Sagan Tosu
- 2017: Thespakusatsu Gunma
- 2019–2020: Gamba Osaka U-23
Medal record
Júbilo Iwata
Runner-up	Emperor's Cup	2004
- * Club domestic league appearances and goals

Hitoshi Morishita (森下 仁志, Morishita Hitoshi; born September 21, 1972) is a former Japanese football player and manager. he is the currently assistant manager of J1 League club Tokyo Verdy.

== Playing career ==
Morishita was born in Kainan, Wakayama on September 21, 1972. After graduating from Juntendo University, he joined Gamba Osaka in 1995. He became a regular player from 1996. However his opportunity to play decreased in 2001 and he moved to Consadole Sapporo in July 2001. Although he played as regular player, the club was relegated to J2 League from 2003. In 2004, he moved to Júbilo Iwata, but he could hardly play in matches and he retired at the end of the 2005 season.

== Coaching career ==
After retirement, Morishita started coaching at Júbilo Iwata in 2006. He coached the youth team from 2006 to 2007 and the top team from 2008 to 2011. In 2012, he became the manager of the club, but due to bad club results, he was sacked in May 2013 when the club was at 17th place out of 18 clubs. In 2014, he signed with J2 League club Kyoto Sanga FC and became a coach. In June, manager Badu was sacked and Morishita managed the club in two matches as caretaker until the club signed with a new manager, Ryoichi Kawakatsu. In 2015, he moved to Sagan Tosu and managed the club for the season. In 2017, he signed with J2 club Thespakusatsu Gunma. However the club finished at the bottom place in 2017 and was relegated to J3 League. He resigned at the end of the 2017 season. In 2019, he signed with his old club Gamba Osaka and he became the manager for Gamba Osaka U-23.

== Career statistics ==
Appearances and goals by club, season and competition
Club	Season	League			Emperor's Cup		J.League Cup		Asia		Total	
Club	Season	Division	Apps	Goals	Apps	Goals	Apps	Goals	Apps	Goals	Apps	Goals
Gamba Osaka	1995	J1 League	13	0	1	0	—		—		14	0
Gamba Osaka	1996	J1 League	28	2	4	1	13	0	—		45	3
Gamba Osaka	1997	J1 League	29	2	1	0	5	0	—		35	2
Gamba Osaka	1998	J1 League	27	1	1	0	4	1	—		32	2
Gamba Osaka	1999	J1 League	23	0	2	0	3	0	—		28	0
Gamba Osaka	2000	J1 League	26	2	3	0	1	0	—		30	2
Gamba Osaka	2001	J1 League	5	0	0	0	2	0	—		7	0
Hokkaido Consadole Sapporo	2001	J1 League	13	0	1	0	0	0	—		14	0
Hokkaido Consadole Sapporo	2002	J1 League	29	2	1	0	6	0	—		36	2
Hokkaido Consadole Sapporo	2003	J2 League	37	1	3	0	—		—		40	1
Júbilo Iwata	2004	J1 League	9	0	0	0	4	0	3	0	16	0
Júbilo Iwata	2005	J1 League	0	0	0	0	0	0	2	0	2	0
Career total			239	10	17	1	39	1	5	0	300	12

== Managerial statistics ==
Update; December 31, 2018

Team	From	To	Record				
Team	From	To	G	W	D	L	Win %
Júbilo Iwata	2012	2013	44	14	10	20	31.82
Kyoto Sanga FC	2014	2014	2	1	1	0	50.00
Sagan Tosu	2015	2015	34	9	13	12	26.47
Thespakusatsu Gunma	2017	2017	42	5	5	32	11.90
Gamba Osaka U-23	2019	present					
Total			122	29	29	64	23.77
