= Tsuneyasu Miyamoto =

Japanese footballer and manager

Tsuneyasu Miyamoto 宮本 恒靖
- May 2006 in Tokyo

Personal information
- Full name: Tsuneyasu Miyamoto
- Date of birth: 7 February 1977 (age 49)
- Place of birth: Tondabayashi, Osaka, Japan
- Height: 1.76 m (5 ft 9 in)
- Position: Defender

Youth career
- 1992–1994: Gamba Osaka

Senior career*
Years	Team	Apps	(Gls)
1995–2006	Gamba Osaka	295	(7)
2007–2008	Red Bull Salzburg	21	(0)
2009–2011	Vissel Kobe	42	(1)
Total		358	(8)

International career
1993	Japan U-17	4	(0)
1997	Japan U-20	5	(0)
2000	Japan U-23	1	(0)
2000–2006	Japan	71	(3)

Managerial career
- 2017–2018: Gamba Osaka U-23
- 2018–2021: Gamba Osaka
Medal record
Gamba Osaka
Winner	J1 League	2005
Runner-up	J.League Cup	2005
Runner-up	Emperor's Cup	2006
Representing Japan
AFC Asian Cup
Gold medal – first place	2004 China
- * Club domestic league appearances and goals

Tsuneyasu Miyamoto (宮本 恒靖, Miyamoto Tsuneyasu; born 7 February 1977) is a Japanese former football coach and former player who last coached Gamba Osaka. He played for Japan national team and is the current president of the Japan Football Association.

A central defender, Miyamoto went on to make 71 international appearances and led the Japan national team in the 2002 and 2006 World Cups as well as the 2004 Asian Cup. Miyamoto also captained Gamba Osaka during their 2005 J1 League championship season.

He is also a graduate of the 13th edition of FIFA Master.

== Club career ==
Miyamoto was born in Tondabayashi on 7 February 1977. He joined Gamba Osaka from youth team in 1995. He also continued to study at Doshisha University well into his professional career, graduating and finishing his studies. Miyamoto speaks fluent English, with a little French also in his canon, after spending time with Gamba teammates Claude Dambury and Patrick M'Boma in the past, as well as coach Frédéric Antonetti. While in Austria, he studied German.

Initially, Miyamoto had few opportunities to play as defender, he also played defensive midfielder. From late 1990s, he played as central defender. While he was the de facto team captain of Gamba Osaka in 2004, Gamba's coach was unhappy at the time spent with the national team by Miyamoto and handed the captaincy of Gamba to Satoshi Yamaguchi. Miyamoto continued to captain Japan for a while, ironically, often sitting on the bench for Gamba Osaka. But his professionalism shone through, and he took it all in stride. In 2005, the club won 2005 J1 League. With Ivica Osim taking over the national team from Zico in 2006, Japan saw a clean sweep and Miyamoto was one of many who had probably played his last game for the Japan national team.

In December 2006, Miyamoto signed for 1 season with Red Bull Salzburg with an option for another season. In December 2007, he signed a new deal with the Austrian club through 2009.

On, 15 January 2009, he signed for Vissel Kobe. In 2009, he became a captain and played as center-back and defensive midfielder. However his opportunity to play decreased from 2010. On 19 December 2011, Miyamoto confirmed his retirement in a press conference on Monday afternoon in Kobe, Japan.

== International career ==
Miyamoto played for Japan U17 national team in the 1993 U-17 World Championship and Japan U20 national team in the 1997 World Youth Championship. He played full-time in all matches in both tournaments. In September 2000, he was also selected Japan U23 national team for 2000 Summer Olympics.

On 18 June 2000, Miyamoto debuted for Japan national team against Bolivia. As a centre back, he served as captain for Japan in the 2002 World Cup, after an injury to Ryuzo Morioka, who had begun the tournament as captain. He then continued to captain his country through the 2004 Asian Cup and the 2006 World Cup. At 2004 Asian Cup, he played full-time in all six matches and Japan won the champions. At 2006 World Cup, he played the first two group matches of the cup, but was suspended for the third and last match against Brazil after he received yellow cards against Australia and Croatia. Yuji Nakazawa wore the armband in his place. This competition was his last game for Japan. He played 71 games and scored three goals for Japan until 2006.

== Coaching career ==
After retirement, Miyamoto started coaching career at Gamba Osaka in 2015. He became a manager for Gamba Osaka U-23 in 2017. On 23 July 2018, top team manager Levir Culpi was sacked when the club was at the 16th place of 18 clubs. Miyamoto was named new manager as Culpi successor. On 14 May 2021, Miyamoto was sacked by Gamba Osaka after the form of the 2008 AFC Champions League winners dipped markedly this season, recording one win in the first 10 games during which Gamba scored just three goals to leave the club in 18th place in the 20-team division. Miyamoto raised Gamba to the 9th place in 2018 season.

== Career statistics ==
=== Club ===
Appearances and goals by club, season and competition
Club	Season	League			National cup		League cup		Continental		Total	
Club	Season	Division	Apps	Goals	Apps	Goals	Apps	Goals	Apps	Goals	Apps	Goals
Gamba Osaka	1995	J1 League	11	0	4	0	–		–		15	0
Gamba Osaka	1996	J1 League	13	0	2	0	7	0	–		22	0
Gamba Osaka	1997	J1 League	26	1	3	0	4	0	–		33	1
Gamba Osaka	1998	J1 League	32	0	1	0	4	0	–		37	0
Gamba Osaka	1999	J1 League	30	0	2	0	2	0	–		34	0
Gamba Osaka	2000	J1 League	29	0	0	0	4	0	–		33	0
Gamba Osaka	2001	J1 League	24	0	3	0	2	0	–		29	0
Gamba Osaka	2002	J1 League	20	1	2	0	2	0	–		24	1
Gamba Osaka	2003	J1 League	26	1	2	0	5	1	–		33	2
Gamba Osaka	2004	J1 League	24	0	1	0	0	0	–		25	0
Gamba Osaka	2005	J1 League	30	3	2	0	4	0	–		36	3
Gamba Osaka	2006	J1 League	30	1	5	0	0	0	5	1	40	2
Gamba Osaka	Total		295	7	27	0	34	1	5	1	361	9
Red Bull Salzburg	2006–07	Austrian Bundesliga	9	0	1	0	–		0	0	10	0
Red Bull Salzburg	2007–08	Austrian Bundesliga	12	0	0	0	–		3	0	15	0
Red Bull Salzburg	2008–09	Austrian Bundesliga	0	0	2	0	–		0	0	2	0
Red Bull Salzburg	Total		21	0	3	0	–		3	0	27	0
Vissel Kobe	2009	J1 League	32	1	2	0	5	0	–		39	1
Vissel Kobe	2010	J1 League	6	0	2	0	4	0	–		12	0
Vissel Kobe	2011	J1 League	4	0	1	0	0	0	–		5	0
Vissel Kobe	Japan		42	1	5	0	9	0	0	0	56	1
Career total			358	8	35	0	43	1	8	1	444	10

=== International ===
Appearances and goals by national team and year
National team	Year	Apps	Goals
Japan	2000	2	0
Japan	2001	3	0
Japan	2002	11	0
Japan	2003	10	0
Japan	2004	19	2
Japan	2005	15	1
Japan	2006	11	0
Total		71	3

== Managerial statistics ==
Update; 14 May 2021

Team	From	To	Record				
Team	From	To	G	W	D	L	Win %
Gamba Osaka U-23	2017	2018	49	13	10	26	26.53
Gamba Osaka	2018	2021	117	52	26	39	44.44
Total			166	65	36	65	39.16

== Honors ==
Gamba Osaka

- J1 League: 2005

Red Bull Salzburg

- Austrian Bundesliga: 2007; runner-up: 2008

Japan

- AFC Asian Cup: 2004

Individual

- AFC Asian Cup Best Eleven: 2004
- J.League Manager of the Year: 2020
