= Claude Dambury =

French Guianan footballer (born 1971)

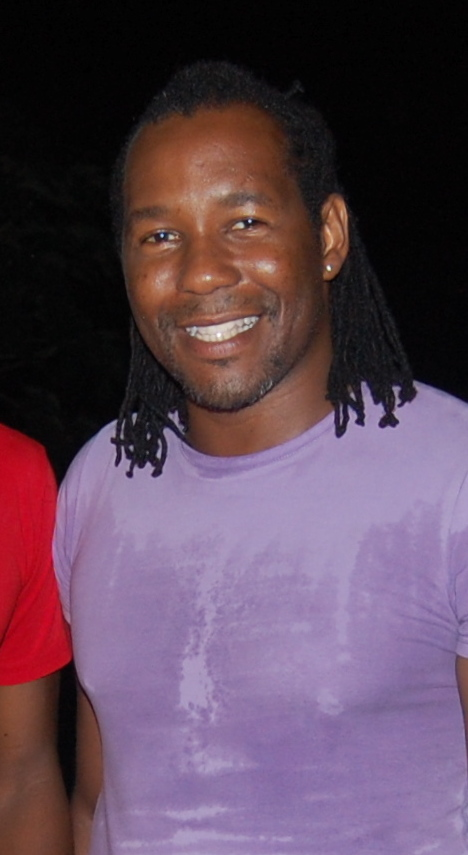

Personal information
- Date of birth: 30 July 1971 (age 55)
- Place of birth: Cayenne, French Guiana
- Height: 1.84 m (6 ft 0 in)
- Position: Defender

Senior career*
Years	Team	Apps	(Gls)
1993–1998	Gueugnon	142	(3)
1998–2001	Gamba Osaka	55	(4)
2001–2002	Créteil-Lusitanos	16	(1)
2002–2003	Martigues	34	(1)
2003–2005	Stade Reims	38	(2)
2005–2009	US Macouria		

International career
2008	French Guiana	2	(0)
- * Club domestic league appearances and goals

Claude Dambury (born 30 July 1971) is a French Guianan former professional footballer who played as a defender. At international level, he made two appearances for the French Guiana national team.

== Career statistics ==
=== Club ===
Appearances and goals by club, season and competition
Club	Season	League			National cup (Note: Includes Coupe de France, Emperor's Cup.)		League cup (Note: Includes Coupe de la Ligue, J.League Cup.)		Total	
Club	Season	Division	Apps	Goals	Apps	Goals	Apps	Goals	Apps	Goals
Gueugnon	1993–94	Division 2	7	0					7	0
Gueugnon	1994–95	Division 2	29	0					29	0
Gueugnon	1995–96	Division 1	27	1					27	1
Gueugnon	1996–97	Division 2	39	2					39	2
Gueugnon	1997–98	Division 2	40	0					40	0
Gueugnon	Total		142	3					142	3
Gamba Osaka	1998	J1 League	22	2	1	0	0	0	23	2
Gamba Osaka	1999	J1 League	27	2	2	0	3	0	32	2
Gamba Osaka	2000	J1 League	27	0	0	0	3	0	30	0
Gamba Osaka	2001	J1 League	6	0	0	0	0	0	6	0
Gamba Osaka	Total		82	4	3	0	6	0	91	4
Créteil-Lusitanos	2001–02	Division 2	16	1					16	1
Martigues	2002–03	National	34	1					34	1
Reims	2003–04	National	34	2					34	2
Reims	2004–05	Ligue 2	4	0					4	0
Reims	Total		38	2					38	2
Total			312	11	3	0	6	0	321	11

=== International ===
Appearances and goals by national team and year
National team	Year	Apps	Goals
French Guiana	2008	2	0
Total		2	0
