= Expo '70 Commemorative Stadium =

Sports venue in Suita, Japan

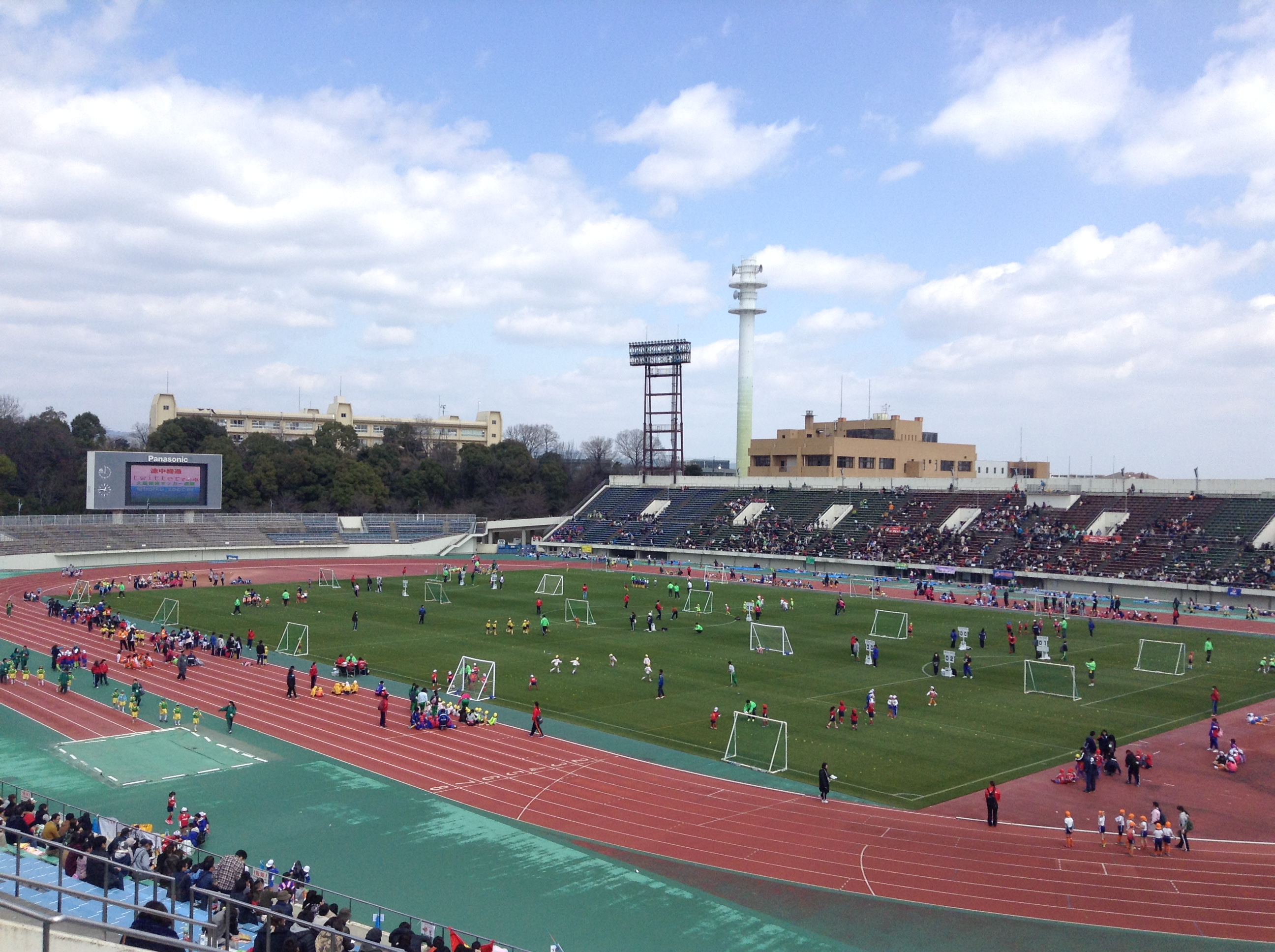
- Interactive map of Expo '70 Commemorative Stadium
- Location: Suita, Osaka, Japan
- Coordinates: 34.810278°N 135.5425°E
- Owner: Osaka Prefecture
- Capacity: 21,000 (mostly seated)
- Surface: Grass
- Field size: 106 x 68.9 m

Construction
- Opened: 1972
- Renovated: 1985, 1993, 1996, 2006

Tenants
- Gamba Osaka (1980–2015); Gamba Osaka U-23 (2016–2020)

Expo '70 Commemorative Stadium (万博記念競技場, Banpaku Kinen Kyōgi-jō), a.k.a. “Osaka Expo '70 Stadium", is an athletics stadium located in the Expo Commemoration Park, the site of Expo '70, in the city of Suita, Osaka Prefecture, Japan. It has a capacity of around about 21,000.

The stadium was the home ground of J.League club Gamba Osaka between 1993 and 2015 before the club moved to Suita City Football Stadium. It remains in use as a local athletics venue, rugby and as a home venue for Gamba Osaka's Under-23 team in the J3 League.

== Access ==
The stadium can be reached via an approximately one-minute walk from Koen-higashiguchi Station on the Osaka Monorail Saito Line.
