= 1997 Kyoto Purple Sanga season =

Kyoto Purple Sanga
1997 season
- Manager: Rocha
- Stadium: Nishikyogoku Athletic Stadium
- J.League: 14th
- Emperor's Cup: 4th Round
- J.League Cup: GL-E 3rd
- Top goalscorer: Nobuhiro Takeda (9)
Home colours	Away colours

1997 Kyoto Purple Sanga season

== Competitions ==
Competitions	Position
J.League	14th / 17 clubs
Emperor's Cup	4th round
J.League Cup	GL-E 3rd / 4 clubs

== Domestic results ==
=== J.League ===
1-1	bye

16 April 1997 1-2	JEF United Ichihara	2-4	Kyoto Purple Sanga	Ichihara Seaside Stadium
JST (UTC+09)

19 April 1997 1-3	Kyoto Purple Sanga	0-2	Bellmare Hiratsuka	Nishikyogoku Athletic Stadium
JST (UTC+09)

23 April 1997 1-4	Yokohama Marinos	3-1	Kyoto Purple Sanga	Yokohama Mitsuzawa Stadium
JST (UTC+09)

26 April 1997 1-5	Kyoto Purple Sanga	1-3	Shimizu S-Pulse	Nishikyogoku Athletic Stadium
JST (UTC+09)

3 May 1997 1-6	Sanfrecce Hiroshima	1-0	Kyoto Purple Sanga	Hiroshima Big Arch
JST (UTC+09)

7 May 1997 1-7	Kyoto Purple Sanga	1-0	Avispa Fukuoka	Nishikyogoku Athletic Stadium
JST (UTC+09)

10 May 1997 1-8	Cerezo Osaka	1-2	Kyoto Purple Sanga	Tottori Soccer Stadium
JST (UTC+09)

17 May 1997 1-9	Kyoto Purple Sanga	0-2	Vissel Kobe	Ishikawa Kanazawa Stadium
JST (UTC+09)

24 May 1997 1-10	Kashima Antlers	4-0	Kyoto Purple Sanga	Kashima Soccer Stadium
JST (UTC+09)

28 May 1997 1-11	Kyoto Purple Sanga	1-3	Nagoya Grampus Eight	Nishikyogoku Athletic Stadium
JST (UTC+09)

31 May 1997 1-12	Yokohama Flügels	0-1	Kyoto Purple Sanga	Yokohama Mitsuzawa Stadium
JST (UTC+09)

5 July 1997 1-13	Kyoto Purple Sanga	0-6	Júbilo Iwata	Nishikyogoku Athletic Stadium
JST (UTC+09)

9 July 1997 1-14	Kashiwa Reysol	3-2 (GG) (a.e.t.)	Kyoto Purple Sanga	Hitachi Kashiwa Soccer Stadium
JST (UTC+09)

12 July 1997 1-15	Kyoto Purple Sanga	1-1 (GG) (a.e.t.) (3-4 p)	Urawa Red Diamonds	Nishikyogoku Athletic Stadium
JST (UTC+09)

16 July 1997 1-16	Gamba Osaka	0-3	Kyoto Purple Sanga	Osaka Expo '70 Stadium
JST (UTC+09)

19 July 1997 1-17	Kyoto Purple Sanga	2-1	Verdy Kawasaki	Nishikyogoku Athletic Stadium
JST (UTC+09)

30 July 1997 2-1	Kyoto Purple Sanga	3-2	Gamba Osaka	Tottori Soccer Stadium
JST (UTC+09)

2-2	bye

6 August 1997 2-3	Kyoto Purple Sanga	2-3 (GG) (a.e.t.)	JEF United Ichihara	Kagoshima Kamoike Stadium
JST (UTC+09)

9 August 1997 2-4	Bellmare Hiratsuka	2-1	Kyoto Purple Sanga	Hiratsuka Athletics Stadium
JST (UTC+09)

15 August 1997 2-5	Kyoto Purple Sanga	1-4	Yokohama Marinos	Nishikyogoku Athletic Stadium
JST (UTC+09)

20 August 1997 2-6	Shimizu S-Pulse	1-0	Kyoto Purple Sanga	Nihondaira Sports Stadium
JST (UTC+09)

23 August 1997 2-7	Kyoto Purple Sanga	0-3	Sanfrecce Hiroshima	Nishikyogoku Athletic Stadium
JST (UTC+09)

30 August 1997 2-8	Avispa Fukuoka	4-2	Kyoto Purple Sanga	Hakatanomori Football Stadium
JST (UTC+09)

3 September 1997 2-9	Kyoto Purple Sanga	1-1 (GG) (a.e.t.) (6-7 p)	Cerezo Osaka	Nishikyogoku Athletic Stadium
JST (UTC+09)

6 September 1997 2-10	Vissel Kobe	4-2	Kyoto Purple Sanga	Kobe Universiade Memorial Stadium
JST (UTC+09)

10 September 1997 2-11	Urawa Red Diamonds	4-1	Kyoto Purple Sanga	Urawa Komaba Stadium
JST (UTC+09)

13 September 1997 2-12	Kyoto Purple Sanga	3-2	Kashima Antlers	Nishikyogoku Athletic Stadium
JST (UTC+09)

20 September 1997 2-13	Kyoto Purple Sanga	1-2	Yokohama Flügels	Nishikyogoku Athletic Stadium
JST (UTC+09)

24 September 1997 2-14	Nagoya Grampus Eight	1-2	Kyoto Purple Sanga	Gifu Nagaragawa Stadium
JST (UTC+09)

27 September 1997 2-15	Júbilo Iwata	2-1	Kyoto Purple Sanga	Júbilo Iwata Stadium
JST (UTC+09)

1 October 1997 2-16	Kyoto Purple Sanga	0-1	Kashiwa Reysol	Nishikyogoku Athletic Stadium
JST (UTC+09)

4 October 1997 2-17	Verdy Kawasaki	2-1 (GG) (a.e.t.)	Kyoto Purple Sanga	Todoroki Athletics Stadium
JST (UTC+09)

=== Emperor's Cup ===
1st Round	bye

2nd Round	bye

14 December 1997 3rd Round	Kyoto Purple Sanga	3-2 (GG) (a.e.t.)	Honda	Nishikyogoku Athletic Stadium
JST (UTC+09)

20 December 1997 4th Round	Kyoto Purple Sanga	1-5	Bellmare Hiratsuka	Kagawa Marugame Stadium
JST (UTC+09)

=== J.League Cup ===
8 March 1997 GL-E-1	Kyoto Purple Sanga	1-0	Avispa Fukuoka	Nishikyogoku Athletic Stadium
JST (UTC+09)

15 March 1997 GL-E-2	Júbilo Iwata	2-1	Kyoto Purple Sanga	Júbilo Iwata Stadium
JST (UTC+09)

19 March 1997 GL-E-3	Kyoto Purple Sanga	0-1	Yokohama Flügels	Nishikyogoku Athletic Stadium
JST (UTC+09)

22 March 1997 GL-E-4	Kyoto Purple Sanga	1-3	Júbilo Iwata	Nishikyogoku Athletic Stadium
JST (UTC+09)

26 March 1997 GL-E-5	Yokohama Flügels	1-0	Kyoto Purple Sanga	Yokohama Mitsuzawa Stadium
JST (UTC+09)

29 March 1997 GL-E-6	Avispa Fukuoka	2-2	Kyoto Purple Sanga	Hakatanomori Football Stadium
JST (UTC+09)

== Player statistics ==
No.	Pos.	Nat.	Player	D.o.B. (Age)	Height / Weight	J.League		Emperor's Cup		J.League Cup		Total	
No.	Pos.	Nat.	Player	D.o.B. (Age)	Height / Weight	Apps	Goals	Apps	Goals	Apps	Goals	Apps	Goals
1	GK	(Japan)	Shinichi Morishita	December 28, 1960 (aged 36)	180 cm / 80 kg	13	0	2	0	6	0	21	0
2	DF	(Japan)	Yoshihiro Nishida	January 30, 1973 (aged 24)	178 cm / 73 kg	31	1	2	0	5	0	38	1
3	DF	(Brazil)	Capone	May 23, 1972 (aged 24)	180 cm / 78 kg	10	0	1	0	5	0	16	0
4	DF	(Brazil)	Carlos	August 13, 1971 (aged 25)	183 cm / 75 kg	23	1	0	0	6	0	29	1
5	DF	(Japan)	Yasuhide Ihara	March 8, 1973 (aged 24)	180 cm / 70 kg	12	0	0	0	5	0	17	0
6	MF	(Japan)	Yuji Okuma	January 19, 1969 (aged 28)	174 cm / 70 kg	31	1	2	0	5	0	38	1
7	DF	(Japan)	Shinsuke Shiotani	May 11, 1970 (aged 26)	175 cm / 75 kg	5	0	0	0	4	0	9	0
8	MF/FW	(Japan)	Toshihiro Yamaguchi	November 19, 1971 (aged 25)	176 cm / 74 kg	7	1	2	0	4	0	13	1
9	FW	(Brazil)	Cléber	October 11, 1972 (aged 24)	180 cm / 77 kg	10	1	0	0	6	2	16	3
10	MF	(Japan)	Ruy Ramos	February 9, 1957 (aged 40)	181 cm / 65 kg	10	0	0	0	2	0	12	0
11	FW	(Japan)	Shinji Fujiyoshi	April 3, 1970 (aged 26)	177 cm / 70 kg	29	6	1	0	6	0	36	6
12	GK	(Japan)	Minoru Kushibiki	June 10, 1967 (aged 29)	186 cm / 82 kg	13	0	0	0	0	0	13	0
13	DF/FW/MF	(Japan)	Hiroshi Noguchi	February 25, 1972 (aged 25)	174 cm / 68 kg	29	4	1	0	3	0	33	4
14	MF	(Japan)	Rikizo Matsuhashi	August 22, 1968 (aged 28)	173 cm / 65 kg	10	0	0	0	0	0	10	0
15	MF	(Japan)	Takayuki Yamaguchi	August 1, 1973 (aged 23)	170 cm / 65 kg	29	6	2	0	6	1	37	7
16	MF	(Japan)	Masaya Honda	November 20, 1973 (aged 23)	180 cm / 75 kg	19	0	1	0	6	0	26	0
17	DF/FW/MF	(Japan)	Shokichi Sato	April 9, 1971 (aged 25)	177 cm / 70 kg	16	0	2	0	2	0	20	0
18	DF	(Japan)	Yasunari Hiraoka	March 13, 1972 (aged 24)	184 cm / 70 kg	26	0	1	0	1	0	28	0
19	FW	(Japan)	Takashi Nagata	April 13, 1972 (aged 24)	174 cm / 71 kg	17	2	1	1	1	0	19	3
20	FW	(Brazil)	Edmílson	March 26, 1974 (aged 22)	176 cm / 69 kg	0	0	0	0	0	0	0	0
21	GK	(Japan)	Yuji Keigoshi	September 17, 1963 (aged 33)	183 cm / 76 kg	0	0		0	0	0		0
22	DF	(Japan)	Takashi Onishi	October 16, 1971 (aged 25)	178 cm / 71 kg	4	0	0	0	0	0	4	0
23	MF	(Japan)	Tatsuma Yoshida	June 9, 1974 (aged 22)	174 cm / 64 kg	2	0	0	0	0	0	2	0
24	MF	(Japan)	Yoshiki Ito	November 1, 1978 (aged 18)	182 cm / 74 kg	0	0		0	0	0		0
25	DF	(Japan)	Haruhiko Sato	June 27, 1978 (aged 18)	178 cm / 68 kg	0	0		0	0	0		0
26	FW	(Japan)	Ryo Fukudome	June 26, 1978 (aged 18)	173 cm / 63 kg	0	0		0	0	0		0
27	DF	(Japan)	Michiharu Otagiri	September 2, 1978 (aged 18)	178 cm / 72 kg	0	0		0	0	0		0
28	GK	(Japan)	Naohito Hirai	July 16, 1978 (aged 18)	183 cm / 79 kg	0	0		0	0	0		0
29	GK	(Japan)	Koji Fujikawa	October 7, 1978 (aged 18)	180 cm / 78 kg	0	0		0	0	0		0
30	MF	(Japan)	Yoshiyuki Matsuyama	July 31, 1966 (aged 30)	177 cm / 72 kg	19	0	2	1	5	2	26	3
20	MF	(Brazil)	Daniel †	October 10, 1970 (aged 26)	175 cm / 74 kg	24	7	2	0	0	0	26	7
31	MF	(Japan)	Yuki Hara †	May 16, 1976 (aged 20)	-cm / -kg	0	0		0	0	0		0
32	FW	(Japan)	Nobuhiro Takeda †	May 10, 1967 (aged 29)	177 cm / 70 kg	16	9	2	1	0	0	18	10
33	DF	(Japan)	Masaki Ogawa †	April 3, 1975 (aged 21)	177 cm / 73 kg	13	0	2	1	0	0	15	1
34	GK	(Japan)	Shigetatsu Matsunaga †	August 12, 1962 (aged 34)	-cm / -kg	6	0	0	0	0	0	6	0
35	MF	(Brazil)	Mineiro †	February 5, 1969 (aged 28)	178 cm / 74 kg	7	1	2	0	0	0	9	1

- † player(s) joined the team after the opening of this season.

== Transfers ==
In:

No.	Pos.	Nation	Player
21	GK	JPN	Yuji Keigoshi (from Avispa Fukuoka)
28	GK	JPN	Naohito Hirai (from Kyoto Purple Sanga youth)
29	GK	JPN	Koji Fujikawa (from Seiko Gakuen Senior High School)
3	DF	BRA	Capone (from São Paulo FC)
18	DF	JPN	Yasunari Hiraoka (from Otsuka F.C. Vortis Tokushima)
22	DF	JPN	Takashi Onishi (from Sanfrecce Hiroshima)
25	DF	JPN	Haruhiko Sato (from Funabashi municipal High School)
27	DF	JPN	Michiharu Otagiri (from Toyama Daiichi High School)
23	MF	JPN	Tatsuma Yoshida (from Kashiwa Reysol)
24	MF	JPN	Yoshiki Ito (from Takigawa Daini Seinior High School)
30	MF	JPN	Yoshiyuki Matsuyama (from Gamba Osaka)
9	FW	BRA	Cléber Eduardo Arado (from Mogi Mirim)
26	FW	JPN	Ryo Fukudome (from Ohzu High School)

Out:

No.	Pos.	Nation	Player
—	GK	JPN	Shuichi Uemura
—	GK	JPN	Isao Ueda
—	DF	JPN	Makoto Sugiyama (retired)
—	DF	JPN	Shunzo Ono (retired)
—	DF	JPN	Norifumi Takamoto (retired)
—	DF	JPN	Ryoichi Fukushige (to Otsuka F.C. Vortis Tokushima)
—	DF	JPN	Yuji Nariyama (retired)
—	DF	JPN	Kozo Hosokawa (retired)
—	DF	JPN	Chikayuki Mochizuki
—	DF	JPN	Hiroyuki Sawada
—	DF	JPN	Hironori Nagamine
—	MF	JPN	Satoru Mochizuki (retired)
—	MF	BRA	Flavio
—	MF	JPN	Yuji Kakiuchi (to Albirex Niigata)
—	MF	JPN	Junji Goto
—	MF	JPN	Akira Kubota
—	MF	BRA	Alexandre
—	MF	JPN	Yosuke Sakamoto
—	MF	BRA	Sérgio
—	MF	JPN	Tomotetsu Kimura
—	MF	JPN	Shigetoshi Kitamura
—	FW	BRA	Baltazar
—	FW	JPN	Yoshiaki Sato
—	FW	BRA	Raudnei
—	FW	JPN	Masahiko Wada
—	FW	JPN	Shuji Nomiyama

== Transfers during the season ==
=== In ===
- (Brazil) Daniel (on April)
- (Japan) Yuki Hara
- (Japan) Nobuhiro Takeda (from Verdy Kawasaki)
- (Japan) Masaki Ogawa (from Kashima Antlers)
- (Japan) Shigetatsu Matsunaga (from Brummel Sendai)
- (Brazil) Mineiro (on September)

=== Out ===
- (Brazil) Edmílson (on February)
- (Brazil) Cléber (on July)
- (Japan) Ruy Ramos (to Verdy Kawasaki)

== Awards ==
none

== Other pages ==
- (in Japanese) J. League official site
- (in Japanese) Kyoto Sanga F.C. official site
