= 1996 Kyoto Purple Sanga season =

Kyoto Purple Sanga
1996 season
- Manager: Oscar; George Yonashiro (acting manager, 11 June 1996)
- Stadium: Kyoto Nishikyogoku Stadium
- J.League: 16th
- Emperor's Cup: Quarterfinals
- J.League Cup: GL-A 8th
- Top goalscorer: Edmílson (4)
- Highest home attendance: 18,058 (vs Verdy Kawasaki, 21 September 1996)
- Lowest home attendance: 5,231 (vs Cerezo Osaka, 30 March 1996)
- Average home league attendance: 9,404

1996 Kyoto Purple Sanga season

== Review and events ==
=== League results summary ===
Overall								Home						Away					
Pld	W	D	L	GF	GA	GD	Pts	W	D	L	GF	GA	GD	W	D	L	GF	GA	GD
30	8	0	22	22	54	−32	24	5	0	10	12	26	−14	3	0	12	10	28	−18

Source: J.LEAGUE OFFICIAL GUIDE 1997. ISBN 4-09-102329-0.

=== League results by round ===
Round	1	2	3	4	5	6	7	8	9	10	11	12	13	14	15	16	17	18	19	20	21	22	23	24	25	26	27	28	29	30
Ground	A	H	A	H	A	H	A	A	H	H	A	A	H	A	H	H	A	H	A	H	A	H	A	H	A	H	H	A	H	A
Result	L	L	L	L	L	L	L	L	L	L	L	L	L	L	L	L	L	W	L	W	L	W	L	L	W	W	W	W	L	W
Position	13	14	16	16	16	16	16	16	16	16	16	16	16	16	16	16	16	16	16	16	16	16	16	16	16	16	16	16	16	16

Source: J.LEAGUE OFFICIAL GUIDE 1997. ISBN 4-09-102329-0.
A = Away; H = Home; W = Win; D = Draw; L = Loss

== Competitions ==
Competitions	Position
J.League	16th / 16 clubs
Emperor's Cup	Quarterfinals
J.League Cup	GL-A 8th / 8 clubs

== Domestic results ==
=== J.League ===
16 March 1996 1	Verdy Kawasaki	1–0	Kyoto Purple Sanga	Kawasaki Todoroki Stadium
14:03 JST (UTC+09)	K. Miura 34'	J. League		Attendance: 12,835; Referee: Yoshimi Ogawa; Assistant referees: Tetsu Karakida, Ichirō Inukai; Fourth official: Mitsune Yamaguchi

20 March 1996 2	Kyoto Purple Sanga	0–2	JEF United Ichihara	Kyoto Nishikyogoku Stadium
15:04 JST (UTC+09)		J. League	Nakanishi 11'; Mutō 64'	Attendance: 8,318; Referee: Zoran Petrović; Assistant referees: Naoki Esumi, Hideaki Harada; Fourth official: Hiroyuki Ishida

23 March 1996 3	Kashima Antlers	5–1	Kyoto Purple Sanga	Kashima Soccer Stadium
15:00 JST (UTC+09)	Hasegawa 23', 89'; Kurosaki 39'; Mazinho 58'; Leonardo 63'	J. League	Matsuhashi 78'	Attendance: 15,224; Referee: Kiyoshi Ōta; Assistant referees: Toshiyuki Mayuzumi, Takao Onshi; Fourth official: Shigeyoshi Haga

30 March 1996 4	Kyoto Purple Sanga	0–2	Cerezo Osaka	Kyoto Nishikyogoku Stadium
15:03 JST (UTC+09)		J. League	24' (o.g.); Morishima 78'	Attendance: 5,231; Referee: Yasuhiro Hemmi; Assistant referees: Kazuya Yanagisawa, Hiroyuki Ōnishi; Fourth official: Yōzō Tanaka

3 April 1996 5	Yokohama Flügels	3–0	Kyoto Purple Sanga	Yokohama Mitsuzawa Football Stadium
19:03 JST (UTC+09)	Zinho 48'; Evair 71'; Harada 89'	J. League		Attendance: 6,162; Referee: Yoshitsugu Katayama; Assistant referees: Kenichi Koshiyama, Takuji Fukazawa; Fourth official: Jōji Kashihara

6 April 1996 6	Kyoto Purple Sanga	1–5	Shimizu S-Pulse	Kyoto Nishikyogoku Stadium
15:04 JST (UTC+09)	Nagata 45'	J. League	Massaro 33', 60'; Sawanobori 56', 67'; T. Itō 66'	Attendance: 8,683; Referee: Tōru Kamikawa; Assistant referees: Yoshikazu Hiroshima, Kōji Minami; Fourth official: Mitsuyoshi Nakaguma

13 April 1996 7	Sanfrecce Hiroshima	3–0	Kyoto Purple Sanga	Hiroshima Big Arch
14:02 JST (UTC+09)	Noh 74', 76'; Takagi 89'	J. League		Attendance: 7,098; Referee: Zoran Petrović; Assistant referees: Tetsu Karakida, Satoru Kawano; Fourth official: Masahiro Katsuyama

17 April 1996 8	Gamba Osaka	4–2	Kyoto Purple Sanga	Expo '70 Commemorative Stadium
19:01 JST (UTC+09)	Mladenović 11', 58'; Morishita 47'; Gillhaus 75'	J. League	Nagata 29'; Flavio 55'	Attendance: 6,349; Referee: Piotr Werner; Assistant referees: Hideaki Harada, Yasushi Tsuchimoto; Fourth official: Tamotsu Ōnishi

20 April 1996 9	Kyoto Purple Sanga	0–2	Bellmare Hiratsuka	Kyoto Nishikyogoku Stadium
15:04 JST (UTC+09)		J. League	Paulinho 59'; Nakata 81'	Attendance: 6,622; Referee: Keiichi Sunakawa; Assistant referees: Kazuya Yanagisawa, Naoki Esumi; Fourth official: Mitsuyoshi Nakaguma

27 April 1996 10	Kyoto Purple Sanga	0–3	Avispa Fukuoka	Kyoto Nishikyogoku Stadium
15:03 JST (UTC+09)		J. League	37' (o.g.); Yamashita 77'; Ueno 83'	Attendance: 7,664; Referee: Zoran Petrović; Assistant referees: Sōichirō Kaneko, Kōji Minami; Fourth official: Hiroyuki Ishida

1 May 1996 11	Kashiwa Reysol	2–0	Kyoto Purple Sanga	Hitachi Kashiwa Soccer Stadium
19:04 JST (UTC+09)	Arima 47'; Wagner 63'	J. League		Attendance: 7,422; Referee: Masayoshi Okada; Assistant referees: Kimio Izaki, Takuji Fukazawa; Fourth official: Masahiko Tsuma

4 May 1996 12	Yokohama Marinos	1–0	Kyoto Purple Sanga	Yokohama Mitsuzawa Football Stadium
15:03 JST (UTC+09)	Noda 69'	J. League		Attendance: 12,533; Referee: Tetsuya Hamana; Assistant referees: Mitsuru Satō, Susumu Takeda; Fourth official: Kazuhiko Uchida

11 May 1996 13	Kyoto Purple Sanga	1–2 (V-goal) (a.e.t.)	Júbilo Iwata	Kyoto Nishikyogoku Stadium
16:04 JST (UTC+09)	Alexandre 51'	J. League	Vanenburg 69'; Schillaci 90'	Attendance: 16,980; Referee: Tatsumi Ōno; Assistant referees: Sōichirō Kaneko, Takashi Aoki; Fourth official: Yoshihisa Takahashi

15 May 1996 14	Urawa Red Diamonds	1–0 (V-goal) (a.e.t.)	Kyoto Purple Sanga	Tokyo National Stadium
19:18 JST (UTC+09)	Taguchi 109'	J. League		Attendance: 50,974; Referee: Piotr Werner; Assistant referees: Toshimitsu Yoshida, Takao Onshi; Fourth official: Fusaya Suzuki

18 May 1996 15	Kyoto Purple Sanga	2–3	Nagoya Grampus Eight	Tottori Stadium
17:05 JST (UTC+09)	Y. Satō 8'; Noguchi 24'	J. League	Asano 44'; Moriyama 47'; Stojković 60'	Attendance: 9,023; Referee: Hiroyuki Umemoto; Assistant referees: Kōji Minami, Hiroyuki Izumi; Fourth official: Jun Kagemoto

28 August 1996 16	Kyoto Purple Sanga	0–3	Yokohama Marinos	Kyoto Nishikyogoku Stadium
19:04 JST (UTC+09)		J. League	Acosta 5'; Noda 7'; Bisconti 37'	Attendance: 13,848; Referee: Leslie Mottram; Assistant referees: Naoki Esumi, Ichirō Inukai; Fourth official: Yoshihisa Takahashi

31 August 1996 17	Júbilo Iwata	2–1	Kyoto Purple Sanga	Júbilo Iwata Stadium
19:00 JST (UTC+09)	Nakayama 15'; Hattori 80'	J. League	Matsuhashi 18'	Attendance: 12,358; Referee: Zoran Petrović; Assistant referees: Hisaharu Kitamura, Tetsu Karakida; Fourth official: Toshiaki Futamata

7 September 1996 18	Kyoto Purple Sanga	1–0	Urawa Red Diamonds	Kyoto Nishikyogoku Stadium
18:34 JST (UTC+09)	Alexandre 13'	J. League		Attendance: 10,088; Referee: Bemard Saules; Assistant referees: Kōji Taniuchi, Takayoshi Kashino; Fourth official: Hiroyuki Ishida

14 September 1996 19	Nagoya Grampus Eight	3–0	Kyoto Purple Sanga	Nagoya Mizuho Athletics Stadium
16:05 JST (UTC+09)	Okayama 72'; Moriyama 75'; Asano 87'	J. League		Attendance: 21,181; Referee: Leslie Mottram; Assistant referees: Tōru Yamashiro, Masatoshi Shibata; Fourth official: Kōji Katō

21 September 1996 20	Kyoto Purple Sanga	2–0	Verdy Kawasaki	Kyoto Nishikyogoku Stadium
19:04 JST (UTC+09)	Ta. Yamaguchi 12'; Fujiyoshi 77'	J. League		Attendance: 18,058; Referee: Zoran Petrović; Assistant referees: Morihisa Yamaguchi, Takashi Aoki; Fourth official: Hiroyuki Ishida

28 September 1996 21	JEF United Ichihara	1–0	Kyoto Purple Sanga	Ichihara Stadium
15:03 JST (UTC+09)	Hašek 62'	J. League		Attendance: 7,142; Referee: Yoshimi Ogawa; Assistant referees: Takashi Kunori, Akihisa Makino; Fourth official: Atsushi Nakamura

2 October 1996 22	Kyoto Purple Sanga	1–0	Kashima Antlers	Kyoto Nishikyogoku Stadium
19:04 JST (UTC+09)	Ta. Yamaguchi 44'	J. League		Attendance: 7,691; Referee: Kenji Tanaka; Assistant referees: Takayoshi Kashino, Kōji Minami; Fourth official: Yoshihisa Takahashi

5 October 1996 23	Cerezo Osaka	2–1	Kyoto Purple Sanga	Osaka Nagai Stadium
14:02 JST (UTC+09)	Manoel 61'; Nishizawa 65'	J. League	Ta. Yamaguchi 11'	Attendance: 8,236; Referee: Bemard Saules; Assistant referees: Satoru Kawano, Takuji Fukazawa; Fourth official: Tsuyoshi Miyake

16 October 1996 24	Kyoto Purple Sanga	0–1	Yokohama Flügels	Kyoto Nishikyogoku Stadium
19:02 JST (UTC+09)		J. League	Yamaguchi 75'	Attendance: 8,227; Referee: Yasuhiro Hemmi; Assistant referees: Naoyuki Mori, Sōichirō Kaneko; Fourth official: Morihisa Yamaguchi

19 October 1996 25	Shimizu S-Pulse	0–2	Kyoto Purple Sanga	Kobe Universiade Memorial Stadium
15:05 JST (UTC+09)		J. League	Fujiyoshi 46'; Alexandre 54'	Attendance: 8,902; Referee: Yoshitsugu Katayama; Assistant referees: Hiroyuki Izumi, Kazuhiko Matsumura; Fourth official: Keiji Hayashi

26 October 1996 26	Kyoto Purple Sanga	2–1 (V-goal) (a.e.t.)	Sanfrecce Hiroshima	Kyoto Nishikyogoku Stadium
15:05 JST (UTC+09)	Edmílson 16'; Noguchi 108'	J. League	Huistra 25'	Attendance: 7,315; Referee: Leslie Mottram; Assistant referees: Akio Okutani, Kōji Minami; Fourth official: Hiroyuki Ishida

30 October 1996 27	Kyoto Purple Sanga	2–1	Gamba Osaka	Kyoto Nishikyogoku Stadium
19:04 JST (UTC+09)	Edmílson 62'; Carlos 70'	J. League	Škrinjar 54'	Attendance: 7,003; Referee: Hiroshi Tanabe; Assistant referees: Yoshikazu Hiroshima, Takashi Aoki; Fourth official: Yoshihisa Takahashi

2 November 1996 28	Bellmare Hiratsuka	0–1	Kyoto Purple Sanga	Hiratsuka Stadium
15:03 JST (UTC+09)		J. League	Edmílson 62'	Attendance: 5,874; Referee: Zoran Petrović; Assistant referees: Yasushi Tsuchimoto, Akihisa Makino; Fourth official: Yoshihiko Tamura

6 November 1996 29	Kyoto Purple Sanga	0–1	Kashiwa Reysol	Kyoto Nishikyogoku Stadium
19:04 JST (UTC+09)		J. League	Edílson 10'	Attendance: 6,310; Referee: Yoshitsugu Katayama; Assistant referees: Satoru Ishizawa, Hiroyuki Ōnishi; Fourth official: Mitsuyoshi Nakaguma

9 November 1996 30	Avispa Fukuoka	0–2	Kyoto Purple Sanga	Hakatanomori Football Stadium
14:34 JST (UTC+09)		J. League	Matsuhashi 24'; Edmílson 32'	Attendance: 11,710; Referee: Fumikazu Shioyazono; Assistant referees: Hideaki Harada, Kazuhiko Matsumura; Fourth official: Daikichi Kanada

=== Emperor's Cup ===
1st Round	bye

2nd Round	bye

17 November 1996 3rd Round	Kyoto Purple Sanga	4–3	Vissel Kobe	Kyoto Nishikyogoku Stadium
: JST (UTC+09)	? ?' ? ?' ? ?' ? ?'		? ?' ? ?' ? ?'

23 December 1996 4th Round	Yokohama Flügels	0–1	Kyoto Purple Sanga	Ehime Matsuyama Athletic Stadium
: JST (UTC+09)			? ?'

26 December 1996 Quarterfinals	Kyoto Purple Sanga	2–3	Gamba Osaka	Yokohama Mitsuzawa Football Stadium
: JST (UTC+09)	? ?' ? ?'		Isogai ?'; Gillhaus ?'; Kojima ?'

=== J.League Cup ===
1 June 1996 GL-A-1-1	Kyoto Purple Sanga	1–1	Bellmare Hiratsuka	Kyoto Nishikyogoku Stadium
18:36 JST (UTC+09)	Raudnei 33'	J. League	Seki 64'	Attendance: 9,254; Referee: Zoran Petrović; Assistant referees: Kazuaki Hamaguchi, Takashi Aoki; Fourth official: Hiroyuki Ishida

5 June 1996 GL-A-1-2	Bellmare Hiratsuka	3–1 (4–2 agg.)	Kyoto Purple Sanga	Hiratsuka Stadium
19:04 JST (UTC+09)	T. Iwamoto 3'; Seki 50'; Natsuka 69'	J. League	Raudnei 23'	Attendance: 8,107; Referee: Archundia; Assistant referees: Kimio Izaki, Satoru Ishizawa; Fourth official: Jōji Kashihara

8 June 1996 GL-A-2-1	Kyoto Purple Sanga	0–1	Sanfrecce Hiroshima	Kumamoto Suizenji Stadium
18:34 JST (UTC+09)		J. League	Abe 29'	Attendance: 6,827; Referee: Kiyoshi Ōta; Assistant referees: Kazuya Yanagisawa, Tōru Yamashiro; Fourth official: Kōji Uehara

12 June 1996 GL-A-2-2	Sanfrecce Hiroshima	0–0 (1–0 agg.)	Kyoto Purple Sanga	Hiroshima Big Arch
19:04 JST (UTC+09)		J. League		Attendance: 4,331; Referee: Tatsumi Ōno; Assistant referees: Hiroyuki Izumi, Hiroyuki Ōnishi; Fourth official: Kōsō Sumida

15 June 1996 GL-A-3-1	Kyoto Purple Sanga	1–1	Urawa Red Diamonds	Kyoto Nishikyogoku Stadium
18:34 JST (UTC+09)	Raudnei 53'	J. League	Boli 31'	Attendance: 14,992; Referee: Yoshitsugu Katayama; Assistant referees: Mitsuru Satō, Takashi Aoki; Fourth official: Yoshihisa Takahashi

19 June 1996 GL-A-3-2	Urawa Red Diamonds	0–1 (1–2 agg.)	Kyoto Purple Sanga	Urawa Komaba Stadium
19:03 JST (UTC+09)		J. League	To. Yamaguchi 37'	Attendance: 18,742; Referee: Tetsuya Hamana; Assistant referees: Yoshikazu Hiroshima, Keiji Kamiara; Fourth official: Toshimitsu Yasumoto

22 June 1996 GL-A-4-1	Gamba Osaka	4–3	Kyoto Purple Sanga	Expo '70 Commemorative Stadium
19:04 JST (UTC+09)	Matsunami 18', 31'; 57' (o.g.); Morioka 76'	J. League	To. Yamaguchi 72'; Matsuhashi 84'; Ōkuma 89'	Attendance: 8,519; Referee: Fumikazu Shioyazono; Assistant referees: Hiroyuki Izumi, Kazuhisa Osada; Fourth official: Tsuyoshi Miyake

26 June 1996 GL-A-4-2	Kyoto Purple Sanga	1–2 (4–6 agg.)	Gamba Osaka	Kyoto Nishikyogoku Stadium
19:04 JST (UTC+09)	Raudnei 77'	J. League	Škrinjar 43'; Matsunami 62'	Attendance: 8,508; Referee: Tōru Kamikawa; Assistant referees: Toshimitsu Yoshida, Kazuhiko Matsumura; Fourth official: Yōzō Tanaka

29 June 1996 GL-A-5-1	Kyoto Purple Sanga	1–3	Yokohama Marinos	Toyama Stadium
18:35 JST (UTC+09)	Raudnei 49'	J. League	Zapata 22'; Nagayama 75'; Omura 82'	Attendance: 10,726; Referee: Archundia; Assistant referees: Kōji Taniuchi, Masaaki Shimomura; Fourth official: Motohito Takeuchi

3 July 1996 GL-A-5-2	Yokohama Marinos	0–1 (3–2 agg.)	Kyoto Purple Sanga	Yokohama Mitsuzawa Football Stadium
19:04 JST (UTC+09)		J. League	To. Yamaguchi 66'	Attendance: 8,159; Referee: Hideo Kikuchi; Assistant referees: Noboru Ishiyama, Hisaharu Kitamura; Fourth official: Ryū Tetsusashi

10 August 1996 GL-A-6-1	Kashiwa Reysol	3–1	Kyoto Purple Sanga	Hitachi Kashiwa Soccer Stadium
18:34 JST (UTC+09)	Sakai 70'; Hashiratani 79'; Edílson 89'	J. League	Y. Satō 30'	Attendance: 10,004; Referee: Zoran Petrović; Assistant referees: Yū Nakamura, Keiji Kamiara; Fourth official: Fujirō Masukura

24 August 1996 GL-A-6-2	Kyoto Purple Sanga	0–0 (1–3 agg.)	Kashiwa Reysol	Expo '70 Commemorative Stadium
18:31 JST (UTC+09)		J. League		Attendance: 2,387; Referee: Lim Kee Chong; Assistant referees: Tōru Yamashiro, Masatoshi Shibata; Fourth official: Hiroyuki Ishida

17 August 1996 GL-A-7-1	Júbilo Iwata	0–0	Kyoto Purple Sanga	Tosu Stadium
19:04 JST (UTC+09)		J. League		Attendance: 12,658; Referee: Yasuhiro Hemmi; Assistant referees: Hideaki Harada, Kazuhiko Matsumura; Fourth official: Masao Motomura

21 August 1996 GL-A-7-2	Kyoto Purple Sanga	3–1 (3–1 agg.)	Júbilo Iwata	Kyoto Nishikyogoku Stadium
19:04 JST (UTC+09)	Carlos 43'; Ta. Yamaguchi 55'; Alexandre 64'	J. League	Nakayama 22'	Attendance: 10,320; Referee: Masayoshi Okada; Assistant referees: Toshiyuki Mayuzumi, Akihisa Makino; Fourth official: Morihisa Yamaguchi

== Player statistics ==
Pos.	Nat.	Player	D.o.B. (Age)	Height / Weight	J.League		Emperor's Cup		J.League Cup		Total	
Pos.	Nat.	Player	D.o.B. (Age)	Height / Weight	Apps	Goals	Apps	Goals	Apps	Goals	Apps	Goals
FW	(Brazil)	Baltazar	July 17, 1959 (aged 36)	180 cm / 75 kg	3	0	0	0	0	0	3	0
DF	(Japan)	Makoto Sugiyama	May 17, 1960 (aged 35)	180 cm / 72 kg	3	0	0	0	2	0	5	0
GK	(Japan)	Shinichi Morishita	December 28, 1960 (aged 35)	180 cm / 80 kg	29	0	3	0	14	0	46	0
MF	(Japan)	Satoru Mochizuki	May 18, 1964 (aged 31)	183 cm / 72 kg	6	0	0	0	3	0	9	0
DF	(Japan)	Shunzō Ōno	March 29, 1965 (aged 30)	177 cm / 79 kg	10	0	2	0	4	0	16	0
MF	(Brazil)	Flavio	August 29, 1965 (aged 30)	190 cm / 81 kg	11	1	0	0	0	0	11	1
GK	(Japan)	Shūichi Uemura	December 3, 1966 (aged 29)	183 cm / 82 kg	1	0	0	0	0	0	1	0
GK	(Japan)	Minoru Kushibiki	June 10, 1967 (aged 28)	186 cm / 82 kg	2	0	0	0	0	0	2	0
DF	(Japan)	Norifumi Takamoto	December 31, 1967 (aged 28)	194 cm / 82 kg	3	0	0	0	0	0	3	0
MF	(Japan)	Rikizō Matsuhashi	August 22, 1968 (aged 27)	173 cm / 65 kg	17	3	0	0	10	1	27	4
MF	(Japan)	Yūji Ōkuma	January 19, 1969 (aged 27)	174 cm / 70 kg	19	0	2	0	13	1	34	1
FW	(Japan)	Yoshiaki Satō	June 19, 1969 (aged 26)	188 cm / 82 kg	4	1	0	0	5	1	9	2
MF	(Japan)	Yūji Kakiuchi	August 31, 1969 (aged 26)	164 cm / 64 kg	1	0	0	0	0	0	1	0
DF	(Japan)	Ryōichi Fukushige	January 30, 1971 (aged 25)	180 cm / 76 kg	2	0	0	0	0	0	2	0
DF	(Japan)	Shōkichi Satō	April 9, 1971 (aged 24)	177 cm / 70 kg	1	0	0	0	9	0	10	0
GK	(Japan)	Isao Ueda	April 11, 1971 (aged 24)	188 cm / 80 kg	0	0		0	0	0		0
DF	(Japan)	Yūji Nariyama	May 20, 1971 (aged 24)	177 cm / 69 kg	8	0	0	0	0	0	8	0
DF	(Japan)	Kōzō Hosokawa	August 3, 1971 (aged 24)	168 cm / 63 kg	7	0	0	0	1	0	8	0
MF	(Japan)	Junji Gotō	August 9, 1971 (aged 24)	170 cm / 65 kg	1	0	0	0	0	0	1	0
DF	(Brazil)	Carlos	August 13, 1971 (aged 24)	183 cm / 75 kg	25	1	3	1	12	1	40	3
MF	(Japan)	Hiroshi Noguchi	February 25, 1972 (aged 24)	174 cm / 68 kg	29	2	3	0	8	0	40	2
FW	(Japan)	Takashi Nagata	April 13, 1972 (aged 23)	174 cm / 71 kg	23	2	1	0	10	0	34	2
DF	(Japan)	Chikayuki Mochizuki	May 20, 1972 (aged 23)	178 cm / 73 kg	11	0	0	0	0	0	11	0
FW	(Japan)	Yoshihiro Nishida	January 30, 1973 (aged 23)	178 cm / 73 kg	16	0	2	0	11	0	29	0
MF	(Japan)	Yasuhide Ihara	March 8, 1973 (aged 23)	180 cm / 70 kg	16	0	3	0	8	0	27	0
MF	(Japan)	Akira Kubota	April 12, 1973 (aged 22)	168 cm / 63 kg	0	0		0	0	0		0
MF	(Japan)	Takayuki Yamaguchi	August 1, 1973 (aged 22)	170 cm / 65 kg	22	3	3	2	4	1	29	6
MF	(Brazil)	Alexandre	August 15, 1973 (aged 22)	177 cm / 65 kg	20	3	0	0	9	1	29	4
MF	(Japan)	Masaya Honda	November 20, 1973 (aged 22)	180 cm / 75 kg	14	0	2	0	5	0	21	0
MF	(Japan)	Yōsuke Sakamoto	January 12, 1974 (aged 22)	170 cm / 60 kg	7	0	0	0	0	0	7	0
DF	(Japan)	Hiroyuki Sawada	January 29, 1974 (aged 22)	176 cm / 70 kg	0	0		0	0	0		0
FW	(Brazil)	Edmílson	March 26, 1974 (aged 21)	176 cm / 69 kg	13	4	3	1	0	0	16	5
DF	(Japan)	Shinsuke Shiotani †	May 11, 1970 (aged 25)	-cm / -kg	27	0	3	0	12	0	42	0
DF	(Japan)	Hironori Nagamine †	May 12, 1973 (aged 22)	180 cm / 73 kg	1	0	0	0	0	0	1	0
MF	(Japan)	Ruy Ramos †	February 9, 1957 (aged 39)	181 cm / 65 kg	10	0	2	2	9	0	21	2
MF	(Japan)	Toshihiro Yamaguchi †	November 19, 1971 (aged 24)	176 cm / 74 kg	9	0	2	0	11	0	22	0
MF	(Brazil)	Sérgio †	January 11, 1967 (aged 29)	178 cm / 72 kg	9	0	2	0	11	0	22	0
FW	(Brazil)	Raudnei †	July 18, 1965 (aged 30)	179 cm / 74 kg	5	0	0	0	10	5	15	5
FW	(Japan)	Shinji Fujiyoshi †	April 3, 1970 (aged 25)	176 cm / 66 kg	13	2	3	1	0	0	16	3
MF	(Japan)	Tomotetsu Kimura †	June 16, 1974 (aged 21)	cm / kg	0	0		0	0	0		0
MF	(Japan)	Shigetoshi Kitamura †	May 21, 1975 (aged 20)	cm / kg	0	0		0	0	0		0
FW	(Japan)	Masahiko Wada †	October 29, 1975 (aged 20)	cm / kg	0	0		0	0	0		0
FW	(Japan)	Shūji Nomiyama †	May 23, 1977 (aged 18)	cm / kg	0	0		0	0	0		0

- † player(s) joined the team after the opening of this season.

== Transfers ==
In:

No.	Pos.	Nation	Player
—	GK	JPN	Minoru Kushibiki (from Otsuka F.C.)
—	DF	JPN	Shunzō Ōno (from Kashima Antlers)
—	MF	BRA	Flavio Henrique de Paiva Campos (from Juventude)
—	MF	JPN	Rikizō Matsuhashi (from Yokohama Marinos)
—	MF	JPN	Yūji Ōkuma (from Kashiwa Reysol)
—	MF	JPN	Takayuki Yamaguchi (from Brummel Sendai)
—	MF	BRA	José Alexandre Alves Lindo (from São Paulo)
—	MF	JPN	Masaya Honda (from Kinki University)
—	MF	JPN	Yōsuke Sakamoto (from Doshisha University)
—	FW	JPN	Yoshihiro Nishida (from Sanfrecce Hiroshima)

Out:

No.	Pos.	Nation	Player
—	DF	JPN	Shinji Tanaka (retired)
—	DF	JPN	Osamu Adachi (retired)
—	DF	JPN	Naohiko Minobe (retired)
—	DF	JPN	Tetsuya Ogura (retired)
—	DF	JPN	谷居 道太 (to Blaze Kumamoto)
—	DF	JPN	Tetsumasa Kimura (to Blaze Kumamoto)
—	MF	BRA	マウリシーニョ (to Botafogo)
—	MF	BRA	アリターナ (to Rio Branco)
—	MF	JPN	小西 俊市朗 (to Fukushima FC)
—	MF	JPN	栗田 守 (to Prima Ham F.C.)
—	MF	JPN	高橋 佳秀 (to Prima Ham F.C.)
—	FW	JPN	遠藤 善主 (to Ventforet Kofu)

== Transfers during the season ==
=== In ===
- (Japan) Shinsuke Shiotani (from Otsuka F.C.)
- (Japan) Hironori Nagamine
- (Japan) Ruy Ramos (from Verdy Kawasaki)
- (Japan) Toshihiro Yamaguchi (from Gamba Osaka)
- (Brazil) Sérgio Soares da Silva (on May)
- (Brazil) Raudnei Aniversa Freire (on May)
- (Japan) Shinji Fujiyoshi (from Verdy Kawasaki)
- (Japan) Tomotetsu Kimura
- (Japan) Shigetoshi Kitamura
- (Japan) Masahiko Wada
- (Japan) Shūji Nomiyama

=== Out ===
- (Brazil) Baltazar (on May)
- (Brazil) Flavio (on May)
- (Japan) Hironori Nagamine
- (Japan) Shuichi Uemura

== Awards ==
none

== Other pages ==
- (in Japanese) J. League official site
- (in Japanese) Kyoto Sanga F.C. official site
