= 1996 J.League =

4th season of J1 League

J.League
- Season: 1996
- Champions: Kashima Antlers; 1st J.League title
- Asian Club Championship: Kashima Antlers
- Matches: 240
- Goals: 778 (3.24 per match)
- Top goalscorer: Kazuyoshi Miura (23 goals)
- Highest attendance: 50,974 – Reds vs. Sanga (May 15)
- Lowest attendance: 4,491 – Sanfrecce vs. Avispa (November 6)
- Average attendance: 13,353

The 1996 J.League season was the fourth season since the establishment of the J.League. The season began on March 16 and ended on November 9.

== Clubs ==
The following sixteen clubs participated in J.League during the 1996 season. Of these clubs, Kyoto Purple Sanga, and Avispa Fukuoka were newly promoted teams from Japan Football League.

- Avispa Fukuoka
- Bellmare Hiratsuka
- Cerezo Osaka
- Gamba Osaka
- JEF United Ichihara
- Júbilo Iwata
- Kashima Antlers
- Kashiwa Reysol
- Kyoto Purple Sanga
- Nagoya Grampus Eight
- Sanfrecce Hiroshima
- Shimizu S-Pulse
- Urawa Red Diamonds
- Verdy Kawasaki
- Yokohama Flügels
- Yokohama Marinos

=== Personnel ===
Club	Head coach
Avispa Fukuoka	(Japan) Hidehiko Shimizu
Bellmare Hiratsuka	(Japan) Shigeharu Ueki
Cerezo Osaka	(Japan) Hiroshi Sowa
Gamba Osaka	(Croatia) Josip Kuže
JEF United Ichihara	(Japan) Yasuhiko Okudera
Júbilo Iwata	(Netherlands) Hans Ooft
Kashima Antlers	(Brazil) João Carlos
Kashiwa Reysol	(Brazil) Nicanor de Carvalho
Kyoto Purple Sanga	(Japan) George Yonashiro
Nagoya Grampus Eight	(Portugal) José Costa
Sanfrecce Hiroshima	(Netherlands) Wim Jansen
Shimizu S-Pulse	(Argentina) Osvaldo Ardiles
Urawa Red Diamonds	(Germany) Holger Osieck
Verdy Kawasaki	(Brazil) Emerson Leão
Yokohama Flügels	(Brazil) Otacílio Gonçalves
Yokohama Marinos	(Japan) Hiroshi Hayano

=== Foreign players ===
Club	Player 1	Player 2	Player 3	Player 4	Player 5	Non-visa foreign	Former players
Avispa Fukuoka	(Argentina) Carlos Mayor	(Argentina) Hugo Maradona	(Argentina) Pedro Troglio	(Paraguay) Richart Báez			
Bellmare Hiratsuka	(Brazil) Almir	(Brazil) Betinho	(Brazil) Paulinho McLaren	(Brazil) Simão	(Brazil) Zé Luiz		
Cerezo Osaka	(Brazil) Francisco Narcizio	(Brazil) Gilmar	(Brazil) Guga	(Brazil) Marquinhos	(Brazil) Sérgio Manoel		
Gamba Osaka	(Croatia) Mladen Mladenović	(Croatia) Vjekoslav Škrinjar	(North Macedonia) Boban Babunski	(Netherlands) Hans Gillhaus	(Ukraine) Akhrik Tsveiba		(Belarus) Sergei Aleinikov (Ukraine) Oleh Protasov
JEF United Ichihara	(Czech Republic) Ivan Hašek	(Federal Republic of Yugoslavia) Nenad Maslovar	(Netherlands) Peter Bosz	(New Zealand) Wynton Rufer		(Brazil) Sandro	
Júbilo Iwata	(Brazil) Dunga	(Italy) Salvatore Schillaci	(Netherlands) Gerald Vanenburg			(Netherlands) Dido Havenaar	
Kashima Antlers	(Brazil) Carlos Mozer	(Brazil) Jorginho	(Brazil) Mazinho	(Brazil) Rodrigo Carbone	(Brazil) Rodrigo Mendes		(Brazil) Leonardo
Kashiwa Reysol	(Brazil) Antônio Carlos Zago	(Brazil) Careca	(Brazil) Edílson	(Brazil) Valdir	(Brazil) Wagner		
Kyoto Purple Sanga	(Brazil) Edmílson Matias	(Brazil) José Alexandre	(Brazil) Luiz Carlos	(Brazil) Raudnei	(Brazil) Sérgio Soares		(Brazil) Baltazar (Brazil) Flávio Campos
Nagoya Grampus Eight	(Brazil) Alexandre Torres	(Federal Republic of Yugoslavia) Dragan Stojković	(France) Franck Durix	(Ivory Coast) Donald-Olivier Sié			(Poland) Tomasz Frankowski
Sanfrecce Hiroshima	(Brazil) Antônio Carlos	(Netherlands) Pieter Huistra	(South Korea) Noh Jung-yoon				
Shimizu S-Pulse	(Argentina) Fernando Oliva	(Brazil) Santos	(Italy) Daniele Massaro			(Brazil) Ademir	(Brazil) Toninho
Urawa Red Diamonds	(Denmark) Brian Steen Nielsen	(France) Basile Boli	(Germany) Guido Buchwald	(Germany) Uwe Bein			
Verdy Kawasaki	(Brazil) Argel Fuchs	(Brazil) Bismarck	(Brazil) Magrão			(Bolivia) Ko Ishikawa	(Brazil) Caíco (Brazil) Donizete Pantera
Yokohama Flügels	(Brazil) César Sampaio	(Brazil) Denilson	(Brazil) Evair	(Brazil) Zinho			
Yokohama Marinos	(Argentina) Alberto Acosta	(Argentina) Darío Figueroa	(Argentina) David Bisconti				(Argentina) Gustavo Zapata (Argentina) Néstor Gorosito

== Format ==
In the 1996 season, the league abolished the split-season format and followed a single-season format; sixteen clubs played in double round-robin format, a total of 30 games per club. The games went to golden-goal extra time and penalties if needed after regulation. A club received 3 points for any win, 1 point for PK loss, and 0 pts for regulation or extra time loss. The clubs were ranked by points, and tie breakers are in the following order:

- Goal differential
- Goals scored
- Head-to-head results
- Extra match or a coin toss

The club that finished at the top of the table was declared season champion.

Changes in competition format

- Number of competing clubs increased from 14 to 16
- Followed single-season format instead of split-season format
- Suntory Final Series was held this year, instead of Suntory Championship
- Number of games per club reduced to 30 from 52 games per season

== Final standings ==
Pos	Team	Pld	W	PKL	L	GF	GA	GD	Pts	Qualification
1	(Ibaraki Prefecture) Kashima Antlers	30	21	3	6	61	34	+27	66	1996 J.League Champions; Qualifies to 1996 Suntory Cup*, 1997/98 ACC, and 1997 Super Cup
2	(Aichi Prefecture) Nagoya Grampus Eight	30	21	0	9	63	39	+24	63	Qualifies to 1996 Suntory Cup*
3	(Kanagawa Prefecture) Yokohama Flügels	30	21	0	9	58	44	+14	63	
4	(Shizuoka Prefecture) Júbilo Iwata	30	20	2	8	53	38	+15	62	
5	(Chiba Prefecture) Kashiwa Reysol	30	20	0	10	67	52	+15	60	
6	(Saitama Prefecture) Urawa Red Diamonds	30	19	2	9	51	31	+20	59	
7	(Tokyo) Verdy Kawasaki	30	19	0	11	68	42	+26	57	
8	(Kanagawa Prefecture) Yokohama Marinos	30	14	0	16	39	40	−1	42	
9	(Chiba Prefecture) JEF United Ichihara	30	13	1	16	45	47	−2	40	
10	(Shizuoka Prefecture) Shimizu S-Pulse	30	12	1	17	50	60	−10	37	
11	(Kanagawa Prefecture) Bellmare Hiratsuka	30	12	0	18	47	58	−11	36	
12	(Osaka Prefecture) Gamba Osaka	30	11	0	19	38	59	−21	33	
13	(Osaka Prefecture) Cerezo Osaka	30	10	0	20	38	56	−18	30	
14	(Hiroshima Prefecture) Sanfrecce Hiroshima	30	10	0	20	36	60	−24	30	
15	(Fukuoka Prefecture) Avispa Fukuoka	30	9	2	19	42	64	−22	29	
16	(Kyoto Prefecture) Kyoto Purple Sanga	30	8	0	22	22	54	−32	24	

Rules for classification: Win = 3 pts; P.K. loss = 1 pt; Regulation, E.T. loss = 0 pts

== Top scorers ==
Rank	Scorer	Club	Goals
1	(Japan) Kazuyoshi Miura	Verdy Kawasaki	23
2	(Brazil) Edílson	Kashiwa Reysol	21
3	(Brazil) Evair	Yokohama Flügels	20
4	(Italy) Salvatore Schillaci	Júbilo Iwata	15
5	(Brazil) Magrão	Verdy Kawasaki	13
6	(Czech Republic) Ivan Hašek	JEF United Ichihara	12
6	(Japan) Yoshiyuki Hasegawa	Kashima Antlers	12
8	(Brazil) Mazinho	Kashima Antlers	11
8	(Croatia) Mladen Mladenović	Gamba Osaka	11
8	(Federal Republic of Yugoslavia) Dragan Stojković	Nagoya Grampus Eight	11
8	(Japan) Koji Noguchi	Bellmare Hiratsuka	11
8	(Japan) Masayuki Okano	Urawa Red Diamonds	11
8	(Japan) Takuya Takagi	Sanfrecce Hiroshima	11
8	(Japan) Yasuyuki Moriyama	Nagoya Grampus Eight	11

== Awards ==
=== Individual awards ===
Award	Recipient	Club
Most Valuable Player	(Brazil) Jorginho	Kashima Antlers
Rookie of the Year	(Japan) Toshihide Saito	Shimizu S-Pulse
Manager of the Year	(Brazil) Nicanor de Carvalho	Kashiwa Reysol
Top Scorer	(Japan) Kazuyoshi Miura	Verdy Kawasaki

=== Best Eleven ===
Pos	Footballer	Club	Nationality
GK	Seigo Narazaki	Yokohama Flügels	Japan
DF	Guido Buchwald	Urawa Red Diamonds	Germany
DF	Masami Ihara	Yokohama Marinos	Japan
DF	Naoki Soma	Kashima Antlers	Japan
MF	Jorginho	Kashima Antlers	Brazil
MF	Hiroshi Nanami	Júbilo Iwata	Japan
MF	Masakiyo Maezono	Yokohama Flügels	Japan
MF	Motohiro Yamaguchi	Yokohama Flügels	Japan
FW	Dragan Stojković	Nagoya Grampus Eight	FR Yugoslavia
FW	Kazuyoshi Miura	Verdy Kawasaki	Japan
FW	Masayuki Okano	Urawa Red Diamonds	Japan

== See also ==
- J.League Jikkyou Winning Eleven '97 (PlayStation video game based on the 1996 season)
