= Yūji =

Yuji
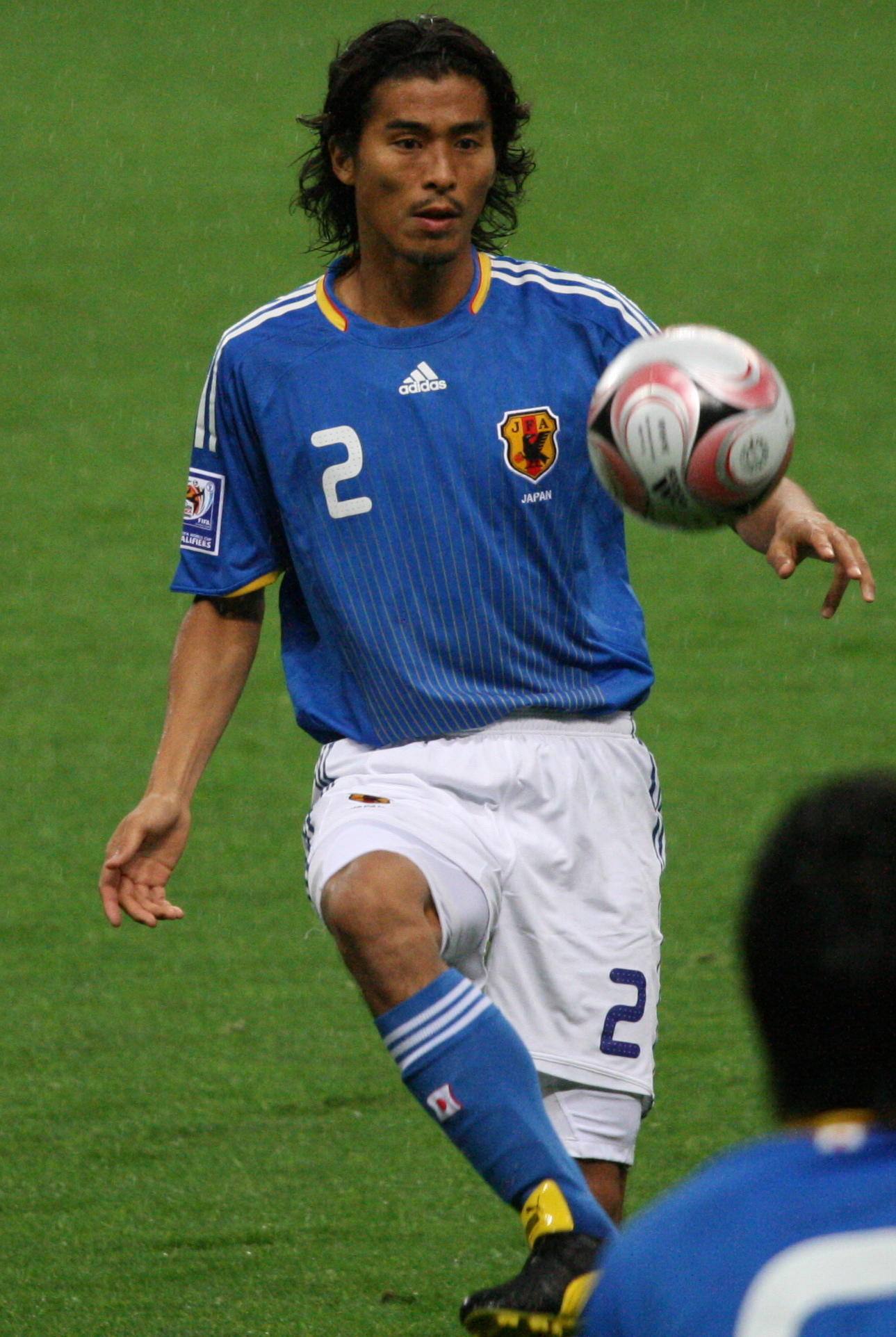
- Yuji Nakazawa, a football player
- Pronunciation: jɯɯdʑi, jɯdʑi (IPA)
- Gender: Male

Origin
- Origin: Japanese
- Meaning: It can have many different meanings depending on the kanji used.

Other names
- Alternative spelling: Yuzi (Kunrei-shiki) Yuzi (Nihon-shiki) Yūji, Yuji, Yuuji (Hepburn)

Yūji, Yuji or Yuuji is a common masculine Japanese given name.

== Written forms ==
Yūji can be written using different combinations of kanji characters. Some examples:

- 勇二, "courage, 2"
- 勇次, "courage, second"
- 裕二, "abundant, 2"
- 祐二, "help, 2"
- 祐次, "help, second"
- 雄治, "masculine, govern"
- 雄二, "masculine, 2"
- 悠児, "permanence, child"
- 悠二, "permanence, 2"
- 祐史, "to help, history"
- 祐司, "to help, rule"
- 裕司, "abundant, rule"

The name can also be written in hiragana ゆうじ or katakana ユウジ.

Yuji is a separate given name.

- 諭二, "to persuade, 2"
- 諭次, "to persuade, second"
- 愉二, "pleased, 2"
- 諭次, "pleased,second"
- 愈一, "more and more, 1"
- 愈次, "more and more, second"

And can also be written in hiragana ゆじ or katakana ユジ.

== Notable people with the name ==
- Yuji Abe (阿部 祐二; born 1958), Japanese television journalist and actor
- Yuji Adachi (足立 祐二; born 1964), Japanese musician and songwriter
- Yuji Adachi (politician) (安達 悠司; born 1982), Japanese politician
- Yuji Aida (相田 勇司; born 1999), Japanese judoka
- Yuji Akahoshi (赤星 優志; born 1999), Japanese professional baseball player
- Yuji Aoki (青木 雄二; 1945–2003), Japanese manga artist
- Yūji Ashimoto (葦本 祐二), Japanese former ski jumper
- Yuji Fujii (藤井 勇治; born 1950), Japanese politician
- Yuji Fujikawa (藤川 祐司; born 1987), Japanese former football player
- Yuji Fujimoto (藤本 祐司; born 1957), Japanese politician
- Yuji Fujimoto (speed skater) (藤本 祐司; born 1970), Japanese speed skater
- Yuji Fujinawa (藤縄 祐爾; born 1941), Japanese retired general
- Yuji Fujita (藤田 雄二; born 1972), Japanese mixed martial artist
- Yuji Fujiwaki (藤脇 祐二; born 1995), Japanese professional rock climber
- Yuji Funayama (basketball) (船山 裕士; born 1992), Japanese professional basketball player
- Yuji Funayama (bobsleigh) (船山 雄次; born 1953), Japanese bobsledder
- Yuji Funayama (footballer) (船山 祐二; born 1985), Japanese former footballer
- Yuji Hamano (濱野 裕二; born 1980), Japanese archer
- Yuji Hanada (花田 裕治), Japanese Paralympic swimmer
- Yuji Hashimoto (橋本 雄二; born 1970), Japanese former football player and manager
- Yūji Hattori (服部 祐兒; 1960–2025), Japanese Sumo wrestler
- Yuji Hayami (早見 裕司; born 1961), Japanese science fiction and fantasy writer
- Yūji Hayata (早田 雄二; 1916–1995), Japanese photographer
- Yuji Hino (火野 裕士; born 1985), Japanese professional wrestler
- Yuji Hirama (平間 祐次; born 1982), Japanese male curler
- Yuji Hiramatsu (平松 祐司; born 1997), Japanese high jumper
- Yuji Hirayama (平山 ユージ; born 1969), Japanese professional rock climber
- Yuji Hironaga (廣長 優志; born 1975), Japanese former football player
- Yuji Horii (堀井 雄二; born 1954), Japanese video game designer
- Yuji Hoshi (星 雄次; born 1992), Japanese footballer
- Yuji Hyakutake (百武 裕司; 1950–2002), Japanese amateur astronomer
- Yuji Ichioka (市岡 雄二; 1936–2002), Japanese American historian and civil rights activist
- Yuji Ide (井出 有治; born 1975), Japanese racing driver
- Yuji Iga (伊賀 裕治; born 1965), Japanese ice hockey player
- Yuji Igarashi (五十嵐 雄二; born 1968), Japanese golfer
- Yuji Iiyama (飯山 裕志; born 1979), Japanese baseball player
- Yuji Iizuka (飯塚 祐司; born 1974), Japanese ice hockey player and coach
- Yuji Ijiri (井尻 雄士; 1935–2017), Japanese economist, accounting researcher and educator
- Yuji Ishikawa (石川 裕司; born 1979), Japanese former football player
- Yuji Ito (fighter) (伊藤 裕二), Japanese former mixed martial artist
- Yuji Ito (footballer) (伊藤 裕二; born 1965), Japanese former football player
- Yuji Iwahara (岩原 裕二), Japanese manga artist
- Yuji Iwasawa (岩沢 雄司; born 1954), Japanese jurist and professor
- Yuji Kajikawa (梶川 裕嗣; born 1991), Japanese professional footballer
- Yuji Kakiuchi (垣内 友二; born 1969), Japanese former football player
- Yuji Kaku (賀来 ゆうじ; born 1984), Japanese manga artist
- Yuji Kamijo (上條 有司; born 1986), Japanese speed skater
- Yuji Kamimura (上村 祐司; born 1976), Japanese former football player
- Yuji Kamosawa (鴨沢 祐仁; 1952–2008), Japanese cartoonist
- Yuji Kaneko (金子 侑司; born 1990), Japanese former professional baseball infielder
- Yuji Kasama (上村 祐司; born 1959), Japanese former volleyball player
- Yuji Kato (加藤 裕司; born 1978), Japanese Paralympic judoka
- Yuji Kato (screenwriter) (加藤 祐司; born 1957), Japanese screenwriter
- Yuji Katsuro (勝呂 裕司; born 1949), Japanese Nordic combined skier
- Yuji Keigoshi (慶越 雄二; born 1963), Japanese former football player
- Yuji Kimura (木村 祐志; born 1987), Japanese footballer
- Yūji Kinoshita (木下 夕爾; 1914–1965), Japanese poet
- Yuji Kishi (岸 祐二; born 1970), Japanese actor and voice actor
- Yuji Kishioku (岸奥 裕二; born 1954), Japanese former football player
- Yuji Kitagawa (born 1986), Japanese rugby union player
- Yuji Kitajima (北島 祐二; born 2000), Japanese footballer
- Yūji Kobayashi (小林 雄次; born 1979), Japanese screenwriter and novelist
- Yūji Koseki (古関 裕而; 1909–1989), Japanese composer
- Yuji Kunimoto (国本 雄資; born 1990), Japanese racing driver
- Yūji Kuroiwa (黒岩 祐治; born 1954), Japanese politician
- Yūji Machi (真地 勇志; born 1962), Japanese voice actor
- Yuji Masuda (増田 裕司; born 1971), Japanese shogi player
- Yuji Matsubara (松原 雄二; born 1979), Japanese former rugby union player
- Yuji Matsumoto (松本 裕治), Japanese information scientist
- Yuji Matsuo (松尾 雄治; born 1954), Japanese former rugby union player and a sports journalist
- Yūji Mikimoto (幹本 雄之; born 1948), Japanese actor and voice actor
- Yuji Mishina, Japanese molecular biologist
- Yuji Mitsuya (三ツ矢 雄二; born 1954), Japanese actor, voice actor, and sound supervisor
- Yuji Miura (三浦 裕司; born 195?), Japanese ski mountaineer and trail runner
- Yuji Miyahara (宮原 裕司; born 1980), Japanese former football player
- Yuji Miyai (宮井 祐治; born 1978), Japanese sailor
- Yuji Moriyama (森山 雄治; born 1960), Japanese anime character designer, animator, animation supervisor and director
- Yuji Nagao (長尾 雄治; 1907-????), Japanese track and field athlete
- Yuji Nagata (永田 裕志; born 1968), Japanese professional wrestler
- Yuji Naka (中 裕司; born 1965), Japanese video game designer and programmer
- Yuji Nakae (中江 裕司; born 1960), Japanese film director
- Yuji Nakagawa (中川 雄二; born 1978), Japanese former football player
- Yuji Nakamura, born 1970, Japanese long-distance runner
- Yuji Nakazawa (中澤 佑二; born 1978), Japanese football player
- Yuji Nariyama (成山 裕治; born 1971), Japanese former football player
- Yūji Nashiro (名城 裕司; born 1983), Japanese kickboxer
- Yūji Nishida (西田 有志; born 2000), Japanese volleyball player
- Yuji Nishino (西野 勇士; born 1991), Japanese baseball player
- Yuji Nomi (野見 祐二; born 1958), Japanese composer
- Yuji Nunokawa (布川 ゆうじ; 1947–2022), Japanese anime producer, animator and director
- Yūji Oda (織田 裕二; born 1967), Japanese actor and singer
- Yuji Ohashi (大橋 祐二; born 1983), Japanese hurdler
- Yuji Ohno (大野 雄二; 1941–2026), Japanese jazz musician
- Yuji Okabayashi (岡林 裕二; born 1982), Japanese semi-retired professional wrestler
- Yuji Okano (大野 雄二; born 1964), Japanese shot putter
- Yuji Okuma (大熊 裕司; born 1969), Japanese former football player and manager
- Yuji Okumoto (ドナルド・奥本裕次郎; born 1959), American actor
- Yuji Onizaki (鬼﨑 裕司; born 1983), Japanese professional baseball infielder
- Yuji Ono (footballer) (小野 裕二; born 1992), Japanese footballer
- Yuji Ozaki (尾崎 雄二; born 1985), Japanese footballer
- Yuji Rokutan (六反 勇治; born 1987), Japanese professional footballer
- Yūji Saiga (雑賀 雄二, Saiga Yūji; born 1951), Japanese photographer
- Yuji Sakakura (阪倉 裕二; born 1967), Japanese former football player and manager
- Yuji Sakamoto (坂元 裕二; born 1967), Japanese screenwriter, lyricist and playwright
- Yuji Sakuda (作田 裕次; born 1987), Japanese football player
- Yuji Sakuragi (桜木 裕司; born 1977), Japanese mixed martial artist, kickboxer and professional wrestler
- Yuji Sasaki (ゆうじ 佐々木; born 1972), Japanese luger
- Yuji Sawa (沢 雄二; 1948–2025), Japanese politician
- Yuji Senuma (瀬沼 優司; born 1990), Japanese footballer
- Yuji Shimada (島田 裕二; born 1966), Japanese mixed martial arts and professional wrestling referee
- Yūji Shiozaki (塩崎 雄二; born 1967), Japanese manga author
- Yuji Sonoda (苑田 右二; born 1973), Japanese rugby union player
- Yuji Sugano (菅野 裕二; born 1961), Japanese former football player
- Yuji Tachikawa (立川 祐路; born 1975), Japanese racing team manager and former racing driver
- Yuji Taguchi (田口 侑治; born 1991), Japanese goalball player
- Yūji Tajiri (田尻 裕司; born 1968), Japanese film director, screenwriter, and actor
- Yūji Takada (高田 裕司; born 1960), Japanese actor and voice actor
- Yuji Takada (wrestler) (高田 裕司; born 1954), Japanese retired flyweight freestyle wrestler
- Yūji Takahashi (高橋 悠治; born 1938), Japanese composer, pianist, critic, conductor and author
- Yuji Takenouchi (竹ノ内 裕治; born 1969), Japanese composer, sound designer, and musician
- Yuji Takeuchi (田口 侑治; born 1983), Japanese former professional kickboxer
- Yuji Tanaka (田中 裕二; born 1965), Japanese comedian
- Yuji Taguchi (田口 侑治; born 1991), Japanese goalball player
- Yuji Terajima (寺嶋 裕二; born 1974), Japanese manga artist
- Yuji Tezuka (手塚 雄士; born 1943), Japanese former professional tennis player
- Yūji Tokizaki (時崎 雄司; 1940–2021), Japanese politician
- Yūji Tsushima (津島 雄二; 1930–2023), Japanese politician
- Yuji Tsukada (塚田 雄二; born 1957), Japanese former football player and manager
- Yūji Ueda (上田 祐司; born 1967), Japanese voice actor
- Yuji Umezawa (梅沢 勇治; born 1945), Japanese sprint canoeist
- Yuji Unozawa (宇野沢 祐次; born 1983), Japanese former football player
- Yuji Wakasa (輪笠 祐士; born 1996), Japanese footballer
- Yūji Wakiya (脇屋 友詞; born 1958), Japanese - Cantonese chef famous
- Yuji Yabu (養父 雄仁; born 1984), Japanese former football player
- Yuji Yaku (夜久 雄爾; born 1961), Japanese bobsledder
- Yūji Yamaguchi (山口 祐司; 1983–2019), Japanese anime director
- Yūji Yamamoto (山本 有二; born 1952), Japanese former politician
- Yuji Yamanaka (宇野沢 祐次; born 1937), Japanese biathlete
- Yuji Yaso (八十 祐治; born 1969), Japanese former football player
- Yuji Yasuraoka (安良岡 裕二; born 1971), Japanese retired professional wrestler
- Yuji Yokoyama (横山 雄次; born 1969), Japanese footballer and manager
- Yuji Yoshimi (吉見 祐治; born 1978), Japanese former professional baseball pitcher
- Yuji Yoshimura (1921-1997), Japanese bonsai master
- Yuji Yoshino (吉野 裕司), Japanese composer
- Yuji Yoshioka (吉岡 雄二; born 1971), Japanese former Nippon Professional Baseball infielder

== Fictional characters ==
- Yuji Kazami (風見 雄二), protagonist of the Grisaia visual novel series
- Yuji Sakai (坂井 悠二), protagonist of the light novel series Shakugan no Shana
- Yuji Terushima (照島 遊児), a character from Haikyu!! with the position of captain and outside hitter from Johzenji High
- Yuji Itadori (虎杖 悠仁), protagonist of the manga series Jujutsu Kaisen
- Yuji Endou (遠藤 勇次), recurring character in the manga series Gambling Apocalypse: Kaiji.

== See also ==
- 47077 Yuji, a main-belt asteroid
