= Takayuki Yamaguchi (footballer) =

Japanese footballer (born 1973)

Takayuki Yamaguchi 山口 貴之
Personal information
- Full name: Takayuki Yamaguchi
- Date of birth: August 1, 1973 (age 53)
- Place of birth: Machida, Tokyo, Japan
- Height: 1.70 m (5 ft 7 in)
- Position: Midfielder

Youth career
- 1989–1991: Yomiuri

Senior career*
Years	Team	Apps	(Gls)
1992–1999	Verdy Kawasaki	19	(2)
1995	→Brummell Sendai (loan)	14	(1)
1996–1997	→Kyoto Purple Sanga (loan)	51	(9)
1999	Vissel Kobe	8	(1)
2000–2001	Gamba Osaka	30	(1)
2001–2003	Vissel Kobe	24	(0)
2004–2005	Thespa Kusatsu	55	(14)
2006–2007	Sagan Tosu	66	(4)
2008	FC Machida Zelvia	6	(0)
Total		273	(32)
Medal record
Verdy Kawasaki
Winner	J1 League	1993
Winner	J1 League	1994
Runner-up	J1 League	1995
Winner	J.League Cup	1992
Winner	J.League Cup	1993
Winner	J.League Cup	1994
Runner-up	Emperor's Cup	1992
- * Club domestic league appearances and goals

Takayuki Yamaguchi (山口 貴之, Yamaguchi Takayuki; born August 1, 1973) is a former Japanese football player.

== Playing career ==
Yamaguchi was born in Machida on August 1, 1973. He joined Verdy Kawasaki from youth team in 1992. However he could not play at all in the match behind Ruy Ramos, Tsuyoshi Kitazawa, Bismarck and so on. In 1995, he moved to Japan Football League club Brummell Sendai and played many matches. In 1996, he moved to newly was promoted to J1 League club, Kyoto Purple Sanga. He played as regular player in 2 seasons and he returned to Verdy in 1998. However he could not play many matches and he moved to Vissel Kobe in July 1999. In 2000, he moved to Gamba Osaka and played many matches. In August 2001, he moved to Vissel again and played until 2003. In 2004, he moved to Japan Football League club Thespa Kusatsu. He played as regular player and the club was promoted to J2 League in 2005. In 2006, he moved to Sagan Tosu and played in 2 seasons. In 2008, he moved to his local club FC Machida Zelvia in Regional Leagues. He retired end of 2008 season.

== Club statistics ==
Club performance			League		Cup		League Cup		Total	
Season	Club	League	Apps	Goals	Apps	Goals	Apps	Goals	Apps	Goals
Japan			League		Emperor's Cup		League Cup		Total	
1992	Verdy Kawasaki	J1 League	-				0	0	0	0
1993	Verdy Kawasaki	J1 League	0	0	0	0	1	0	1	0
1994	Verdy Kawasaki	J1 League	0	0	0	0	0	0	0	0
1995	Verdy Kawasaki	J1 League	0	0	0	0	-		0	0
1995	Brummell Sendai	Football League	14	1	1	0	-		15	1
1996	Kyoto Purple Sanga	J1 League	22	3	3	2	4	1	29	6
1997	Kyoto Purple Sanga	J1 League	29	6	2	0	6	1	37	7
1998	Verdy Kawasaki	J1 League	15	2	3	0	0	0	18	2
1999	Verdy Kawasaki	J1 League	4	0	0	0	3	0	7	0
1999	Vissel Kobe	J1 League	8	1	0	0	0	0	8	1
2000	Gamba Osaka	J1 League	23	1	3	0	4	1	30	2
2001	Gamba Osaka	J1 League	7	0	0	0	2	0	9	0
2001	Vissel Kobe	J1 League	7	0	0	0	0	0	7	0
2002	Vissel Kobe	J1 League	2	0	1	0	1	0	4	0
2003	Vissel Kobe	J1 League	15	0	0	0	6	0	21	0
2004	Thespa Kusatsu	Football League	27	10	4	1	-		31	11
2005	Thespa Kusatsu	J2 League	28	4	1	0	-		29	4
2006	Sagan Tosu	J2 League	39	3	2	0	-		41	3
2007	Sagan Tosu	J2 League	27	1	3	0	-		30	1
2008	FC Machida Zelvia	Regional Leagues	6	0	-		-		6	0
Career total			273	32	23	3	27	3	323	38
