= Shinsuke Shiotani =

Japanese footballer

Shinsuke Shiotani 塩谷 伸介
Personal information
- Full name: Shinsuke Shiotani
- Date of birth: May 11, 1970 (age 56)
- Place of birth: Osaka, Japan
- Height: 1.75 m (5 ft 9 in)
- Position: Defender

Youth career
- 1986–1988: Kindai University High School
- 1989–1992: Kindai University

Senior career*
Years	Team	Apps	(Gls)
1993–1995	Otsuka Pharmaceutical	47	(2)
1996–1998	Kyoto Purple Sanga	47	(0)
1999	Gamba Osaka	2	(0)
Total		96	(2)
- * Club domestic league appearances and goals

Shinsuke Shiotani (塩谷 伸介, Shiotani Shinsuke; born May 11, 1970) is a former Japanese football player.

== Playing career ==
Shiotani was born in Osaka Prefecture on May 11, 1970. After graduating from Kindai University, he joined Otsuka Pharmaceutical in 1993. He played many matches as left side back and left side midfielder. In 1996, he moved to newly was promoted to J1 League club, Kyoto Purple Sanga. In 1999, he moved to his local club Gamba Osaka. Although he played in the first 2 matches, he got hurt in the 2nd match and hardly played in the match after that. He retired at the end of the 1999 season.

== Career statistics ==
Appearances and goals by club, season and competition
Club	Season	League			Emperor's Cup		J.League Cup		Total	
Club	Season	Division	Apps	Goals	Apps	Goals	Apps	Goals	Apps	Goals
Otsuka Pharmaceutical	1993	Football League	1	0	1	0	—		2	0
Otsuka Pharmaceutical	1994	Football League	17	1	2	0	—		19	1
Otsuka Pharmaceutical	1995	Football League	29	1	1	0	—		30	1
Kyoto Purple Sanga	1996	J1 League	27	0	3	0	12	0	42	0
Kyoto Purple Sanga	1997	J1 League	5	0	0	0	4	0	9	0
Kyoto Purple Sanga	1998	J1 League	15	0	0	0	4	0	19	0
Gamba Osaka	1999	J1 League	2	0	2	0	0	0	4	0
Career total			96	2	9	0	20	0	125	2
