= Takashi Nagata =

Japanese footballer

Takashi Nagata 永田 崇
Personal information
- Full name: Takashi Nagata
- Date of birth: April 13, 1972 (age 54)
- Place of birth: Chiba, Japan
- Height: 1.74 m (5 ft 8 1/2 in)
- Position: Forward

Youth career
- 1988–1990: Funabashi High School
- 1991–1994: Meiji University

Senior career*
Years	Team	Apps	(Gls)
1995–1997	Kyoto Purple Sanga	64	(8)
Total		64	(8)
- * Club domestic league appearances and goals

Takashi Nagata (永田 崇, Nagata Takashi; born April 13, 1972) is a former Japanese football player.

== Playing career ==
Nagata was born in Chiba Prefecture on April 13, 1972. After graduating from Meiji University, he joined Japan Football League club Kyoto Purple Sanga in 1995. He played many matches as substitute forward from first season. The club was promoted to J1 League from 1996. He retired end of 1997 season.

== Career statistics ==
Appearances and goals by club, season and competition
Club	Season	League			Emperor's Cup		J.League Cup		Total	
Club	Season	Division	Apps	Goals	Apps	Goals	Apps	Goals	Apps	Goals
Kyoto Purple Sanga	1995	Football League	24	4	0	0	—		24	4
Kyoto Purple Sanga	1996	J1 League	23	2	1	0	10	0	34	2
Kyoto Purple Sanga	1997	J1 League	17	2	1	1	1	0	19	3
Career total			64	8	2	1	11	0	77	9
