= Shuichi Uemura =

Japanese footballer

Shuichi Uemura 植村 修一
Personal information
- Full name: Shuichi Uemura
- Date of birth: December 3, 1966 (age 59)
- Place of birth: Kagoshima, Japan
- Height: 1.83 m (6 ft 0 in)
- Position: Goalkeeper

Youth career
- Shimabara Commercial High School
- Tokai University

Senior career*
Years	Team	Apps	(Gls)
- Toyota Motors
1992–1996	Kyoto Purple Sanga	61	(0)
Total		61	(0)
- * Club domestic league appearances and goals

Shuichi Uemura (植村 修一, Uemura Shuichi; born December 3, 1966) is a former Japanese football player.

== Playing career ==
Uemura was born in Kagoshima Prefecture on December 3, 1966. After graduating from Tokai University, he joined Toyota Motors. In 1992, he moved to Kyoto Shiko (later Kyoto Purple Sanga). He played many matches as goalkeeper until 1994. However the club gained former Japan national team goalkeeper Shinichi Morishita in 1995. So, Uemura he could hardly play in the match behind Morishita from 1995 and retired end of 1996 season.

== Club statistics ==
Club performance			League		Cup		League Cup		Total	
Season	Club	League	Apps	Goals	Apps	Goals	Apps	Goals	Apps	Goals
Japan			League		Emperor's Cup		J.League Cup		Total	
1987/88	Toyota Motors	JSL Division 1	22	0			0	0	22	0
1988/89	Toyota Motors	JSL Division 2	24	0			2	0	26	0
1989/90	Toyota Motors	JSL Division 2	13	0			2	0	15	0
1992	Kyoto Shiko	Football League	18	0			-		18	0
1993	Kyoto Shiko	Football League	17	0	-		-		17	0
1994	Kyoto Purple Sanga	Football League	23	0	0	0	-		23	0
1995	Kyoto Purple Sanga	Football League	2	0	0	0	-		2	0
1996	Kyoto Purple Sanga	J1 League	1	0	0	0	0	0	1	0
Total			120	0	0	0	4	0	124	0
