= Hiroshi Noguchi =

Japanese footballer

Hiroshi Noguchi 野口 裕司
Personal information
- Full name: Hiroshi Noguchi
- Date of birth: February 25, 1972 (age 54)
- Place of birth: Sakai, Ibaraki, Japan
- Height: 1.75 m (5 ft 9 in)
- Position: Defender

Youth career
- 1987–1989: Sakai High School
- 1990–1993: Komazawa University

Senior career*
Years	Team	Apps	(Gls)
1994–2002	Kyoto Purple Sanga	228	(27)
2003	Omiya Ardija	24	(1)
Total		252	(28)
Medal record
Kyoto Purple Sanga
Winner	Emperor's Cup	2002
- * Club domestic league appearances and goals

Hiroshi Noguchi (野口 裕司, Noguchi Hiroshi; born February 25, 1972) is a former Japanese football player.

== Playing career ==
Noguchi was born in Sakai, Ibaraki on February 25, 1972. After graduating from Komazawa University, he joined Kyoto Purple Sanga in 1994. He became a regular player from first season and he played many matches as right and left side back for a long time. However he could hardly play in the match in 2002. In 2003, he moved to Omiya Ardija. He played many matches and retired at the end of the 2003 season.

== Career statistics ==
Appearances and goals by club, season and competition
Club	Season	League			Emperor's Cup		J.League Cup		Total	
Club	Season	Division	Apps	Goals	Apps	Goals	Apps	Goals	Apps	Goals
Kyoto Purple Sanga	1994	Football League	25	9	0	0	—		25	9
Kyoto Purple Sanga	1995	Football League	27	5	0	0	—		27	5
Kyoto Purple Sanga	1996	J1 League	29	2	3	0	8	0	40	2
Kyoto Purple Sanga	1997	J1 League	29	4	1	0	3	0	33	4
Kyoto Purple Sanga	1998	J1 League	25	1	2	0	3	0	30	1
Kyoto Purple Sanga	1999	J1 League	22	1	2	1	4	0	28	2
Kyoto Purple Sanga	2000	J1 League	30	1	1	0	6	0	37	1
Kyoto Purple Sanga	2001	J2 League	40	4	4	1	1	0	45	4
Kyoto Purple Sanga	2002	J1 League	1	0	0	0	1	0	2	0
Omiya Ardija	2003	J2 League	24	1	0	0	—		24	1
Career total			252	28	13	2	26	0	291	30
