= Minoru Kushibiki =

Japanese footballer

Minoru Kushibiki 櫛引 実
Personal information
- Full name: Minoru Kushibiki
- Date of birth: June 10, 1967 (age 59)
- Place of birth: Osaka, Japan
- Height: 1.86 m (6 ft 1 in)
- Position: Goalkeeper

Youth career
- 1983–1985: Takatsuki Minami High School
- 1986–1989: Osaka University of Commerce

Senior career*
| Years | Team | Apps | (Gls) |
| 1990–1991 | Toshiba | 3 | (0) |
| 1991–1995 | Otsuka Pharmaceutical | 77 | (0) |
| 1996–1998 | Kyoto Purple Sanga | 15 | (0) |
| 1999 | Avispa Fukuoka | 0 | (0) |
| Total | | 95 | (0) |
- * Club domestic league appearances and goals

Minoru Kushibiki (櫛引 実, Kushibiki Minoru; born June 10, 1967) is a former Japanese football player.

== Playing career ==
Kushibiki was born in Osaka Prefecture on June 10, 1967. After graduating from Osaka University of Commerce, he joined Toshiba in 1990. In 1991, he moved to Otsuka Pharmaceutical. In 1993, he became a regular goalkeeper. In 1996, he moved to newly was promoted to J1 League club, Kyoto Purple Sanga. However he could not play many matches behind former Japan national team goalkeepers Shinichi Morishita and Shigetatsu Matsunaga. In 1999, he moved to Avispa Fukuoka. However he could not play at all in the match behind former Japan national team goalkeeper Nobuyuki Kojima. He retired end of 1999 season.

== Club statistics ==
| Club performance | | | League | | Cup | | League Cup | | Total | |
| Season | Club | League | Apps | Goals | Apps | Goals | Apps | Goals | Apps | Goals |
| Japan | | | League | | Emperor's Cup | | J.League Cup | | Total | |
|---|---|---|---|---|---|---|---|---|---|---|
| 1990/91 | Toshiba | JSL Division 1 | 3 | 0 | | | 0 | 0 | 3 | 0 |
| 1991/92 | Otsuka Pharmaceutical | JSL Division 2 | 1 | 0 | | | 0 | 0 | 1 | 0 |
| 1992 | Otsuka Pharmaceutical | Football League | 9 | 0 | | | - | | 9 | 0 |
| 1993 | Otsuka Pharmaceutical | Football League | 11 | 0 | 0 | 0 | - | | 11 | 0 |
| 1994 | Otsuka Pharmaceutical | Football League | 29 | 0 | 2 | 0 | - | | 31 | 0 |
| 1995 | Otsuka Pharmaceutical | Football League | 27 | 0 | 1 | 0 | - | | 28 | 0 |
| 1996 | Kyoto Purple Sanga | J1 League | 2 | 0 | 0 | 0 | 0 | 0 | 2 | 0 |
| 1997 | Kyoto Purple Sanga | J1 League | 13 | 0 | 0 | 0 | 0 | 0 | 13 | 0 |
| 1998 | Kyoto Purple Sanga | J1 League | 0 | 0 | 0 | 0 | 0 | 0 | 0 | 0 |
| 1999 | Avispa Fukuoka | J1 League | 0 | 0 | 0 | 0 | 0 | 0 | 0 | 0 |
| Total | | | 95 | 0 | 3 | 0 | 0 | 0 | 98 | 0 |
