= Kushibiki =

Kushibiki (written: 櫛引) is a Japanese surname. Notable people with the surname include:

- Kazuki Kushibiki (櫛引 一紀, born 1993), Japanese footballer
- Masatoshi Kushibiki (櫛引 政敏, born 1993), Japanese footballer
- Minoru Kushibiki (櫛引 実, born 1967), Japanese footballer
- Kushibiki Yumindo (櫛引 弓人, 1859/1865 – 1924), Japanese impresario

== See also ==
- Kushibiki, Yamagata, a former town in Higashitagawa District, Yamagata Prefecture, Japan
