= Shokichi Sato =

Japanese footballer

Shokichi Sato 佐藤 昌吉
Personal information
- Full name: Shokichi Sato
- Date of birth: April 9, 1971 (age 55)
- Place of birth: Aomori, Japan
- Height: 1.78 m (5 ft 10 in)
- Position: Midfielder

Youth career
- 1987–1989: Gonohe High School

Senior career*
Years	Team	Apps	(Gls)
1990–1993	NKK	15	(0)
1991–1992	→Sheffield United (loan)		
1994–1998	Kyoto Purple Sanga	47	(0)
1999	Omiya Ardija	13	(1)
Total		75	(1)
- * Club domestic league appearances and goals

Shokichi Sato (佐藤 昌吉, Satō Shōkichi; born April 9, 1971) is a former Japanese football player.

== Playing career ==
Sato was born in Aomori Prefecture on April 9, 1971. After graduating from high school, he joined NKK in 1990. He played several matches in every season. However the club was disbanded end of 1993 season. In 1994, he moved to Kyoto Purple Sanga. He played many matches as left side midfielder and left side back. In 1999, he moved to newly was promoted to J2 League club, Omiya Ardija. He retired end of 1999 season.

== Club statistics ==
Club performance			League		Cup		League Cup		Total	
Season	Club	League	Apps	Goals	Apps	Goals	Apps	Goals	Apps	Goals
Japan			League		Emperor's Cup		J.League Cup		Total	
1990/91	NKK	JSL Division 1	8	0	-		-		8	0
1992	NKK	Football League	3	0	-		-		3	0
1993	NKK	Football League	4	0	1	0	-		5	0
1994	Kyoto Purple Sanga	Football League	5	0	3	0	-		8	0
1995	Kyoto Purple Sanga	Football League	18	0	1	0	-		19	0
1996	Kyoto Purple Sanga	J1 League	1	0	0	0	9	0	10	0
1997	Kyoto Purple Sanga	J1 League	16	0	2	0	2	0	20	0
1998	Kyoto Purple Sanga	J1 League	7	0	0	0	2	0	9	0
1999	Omiya Ardija	J2 League	13	1	3	0	0	0	16	1
Total			75	1	10	0	13	0	98	1
