= Kozo Hosokawa =

Japanese footballer

Kozo Hosokawa 細川 浩三
Personal information
- Full name: Kozo Hosokawa
- Date of birth: August 3, 1971 (age 55)
- Place of birth: Kyoto, Japan
- Height: 1.68 m (5 ft 6 in)
- Position: Defender

Youth career
- 1987–1989: Yamashiro High School
- 1990–1993: Aoyama Gakuin University

Senior career*
Years	Team	Apps	(Gls)
1994–1996	Kyoto Purple Sanga	56	(5)
Total		56	(5)
- * Club domestic league appearances and goals

Kozo Hosokawa (細川 浩三, Hosokawa Kōzō; born August 3, 1971) is a Japanese former football player.

== Playing career ==
Hosokawa was born in Kyoto Prefecture on August 3, 1971. After graduating from Aoyama Gakuin University, he joined the local Japan Football League club Kyoto Purple Sanga in 1994. He played often as right or left back and the club was promoted to the J1 League in 1996. However, he did no play as much in 1996 and he retired at the end of the season.

== Career statistics ==
Appearances and goals by club, season and competition
Club	Season	League			Emperor's Cup		J.League Cup		Total	
Club	Season	Division	Apps	Goals	Apps	Goals	Apps	Goals	Apps	Goals
Kyoto Purple Sanga	1994	Football League	26	4	0	0	-		26	4
Kyoto Purple Sanga	1995	Football League	23	1	1	0	-		24	1
Kyoto Purple Sanga	1996	J1 League	7	0	0	0	1	0	8	0
Career total			56	5	1	0	1	0	58	5
