= Hisashi Kurosaki =

Japanese footballer and manager

Hisashi Kurosaki 黒崎 久志
Personal information
- Full name: Hisashi Kurosaki
- Date of birth: May 8, 1968 (age 58)
- Place of birth: Kanuma, Tochigi, Japan
- Height: 1.85 m (6 ft 1 in)
- Position: Forward

Team information
- Current team: Myanmar U23 (Head Coach)

Youth career
- 1984–1986: Utsunomiya Gakuen High School

Senior career*
Years	Team	Apps	(Gls)
1987–1992	Honda FC	95	(31)
1992–1997	Kashima Antlers	144	(48)
1998–1999	Kyoto Purple Sanga	41	(16)
2000	Vissel Kobe	17	(5)
2001	Albirex Niigata	44	(21)
2002–2003	Omiya Ardija	60	(9)
Total		401	(130)

International career
1989–1997	Japan	24	(4)

Managerial career
- 2007–2010: Albirex Niigata (assistant)
- 2010–2012: Albirex Niigata
- 2013–2017: Omiya Ardija (assistant)
- 2018–2020: Kashima Antlers (assistant)
- 2021–2023: Shandong Taishan (assistant)
- 2023: Wuhan Three Towns (assistant)
- 2024: Qingdao West Coast
- 2025–: Myanmar U23
Medal record
Honda
Runner-up	JSL Cup	1991
Kashima Antlers
Winner	J1 League	1996
Runner-up	J1 League	1993
Runner-up	J1 League	1997
Winner	J.League Cup	1997
Winner	Emperor's Cup	1997
Runner-up	Emperor's Cup	1993
- * Club domestic league appearances and goals

Hisashi Kurosaki (黒崎 久志, Kurosaki Hisashi; born May 8, 1968) is a Japanese former football player and manager who is currently the head coach of the Myanmar U23 national team. He played for Japan national team. His first name was written "比差支" (same pronunciation) from 1992 to 1999.

== Playing career ==
Kurosaki was born in Kanuma on May 8, 1968. After graduating from high school, he joined Honda in 1987. In 1992, he moved to J1 League club Kashima Antlers. In 1996, the club won J1 League. In 1997, the club also won J.League Cup and Emperor's Cup. In 1998, he moved to Kyoto Purple Sanga. In 2000s, he played at Vissel Kobe (2000), Albirex Niigata (2001) and Omiya Ardija (2002–03). He retired in 2003.

== International career ==
On May 5, 1989, Kurosaki debuted for Japan national team against South Korea. He also played at 1990 FIFA World Cup qualification and 1990 Asian Games. In 1993, he was selected Japan for the first time in 3 years. He played 24 games and scored 4 goals for Japan until 1997.

== Coaching career ==
After retirement, Kurosaki started coaching career at Kashima Antlers in 2004. He moved to Albirex Niigata in 2007 and became a manager in 2010. He was sacked in May 2012. In 2013, he signed with Omiya Ardija and became a coach. In May 2017, he was sacked with manager Hiroki Shibuya.

== Club statistics ==
Club performance			League		Cup		League Cup		Total	
Season	Club	League	Apps	Goals	Apps	Goals	Apps	Goals	Apps	Goals
Japan			League		Emperor's Cup		J.League Cup		Total	
1987/88	Honda	JSL Division 1	18	2	2	0	3	0	23	2
1988/89	Honda	JSL Division 1	22	7	2	1	0	0	24	8
1989/90	Honda	JSL Division 1	21	11	2	2	0	0	23	13
1990/91	Honda	JSL Division 1	16	7			1	0	17	7
1991/92	Honda	JSL Division 1	18	4			4	9	22	13
1992	Kashima Antlers	J1 League	-		3	5	8	4	11	9
1993	Kashima Antlers	J1 League	30	11	5	3	0	0	35	14
1994	Kashima Antlers	J1 League	30	10	0	0	1	0	31	10
1995	Kashima Antlers	J1 League	39	11	0	0	-		39	11
1996	Kashima Antlers	J1 League	19	6	2	0	14	3	35	9
1997	Kashima Antlers	J1 League	26	10	2	0	5	3	33	13
1998	Kyoto Purple Sanga	J1 League	27	13	2	4	4	3	33	20
1999	Kyoto Purple Sanga	J1 League	14	3	1	0	1	0	16	3
2000	Vissel Kobe	J1 League	17	5	4	1	0	0	21	6
2001	Albirex Niigata	J2 League	44	21	4	2	2	0	50	23
2002	Omiya Ardija	J2 League	35	7	3	1	-		38	8
2003	Omiya Ardija	J2 League	25	2	3	1	-		28	3
Total			401	130	35	20	43	22	479	172

== National team statistics ==
Japan national team
Year	Apps	Goals
1989	7	1
1990	2	0
1991	0	0
1992	0	0
1993	1	0
1994	1	0
1995	10	3
1996	2	0
1997	1	0
Total	24	4

== Managerial statistics ==
Team	From	To	Record				
Team	From	To	G	W	D	L	Win %
Albirex Niigata	2010	2012	81	24	25	32	29.63
Qingdao West Coast	2024	2024	23	5	5	13	21.74
Myanmar national under-23 football team	2025		9	0	5	4	0.00
Total			113	29	35	49	25.66

== Honors ==
=== Teams ===
- J1 League: 1996
- Emperor's Cup: 1997
- J.League Cup: 1997
- Japanese Super Cup: 1997

=== Individual ===
- Dynasty Cup Top scorers: 1995
