= Ryoichi Fukushige =

Japanese footballer

Ryoichi Fukushige 福重 良一
Personal information
- Full name: Ryoichi Fukushige
- Date of birth: January 30, 1971 (age 55)
- Place of birth: Wakayama, Japan
- Height: 1.81 m (5 ft 11 1/2 in)
- Position: Defender

Youth career
- 1986–1988: Wakayama Technical High School
- 1989–1992: Osaka University of Health and Sport Sciences

Senior career*
Years	Team	Apps	(Gls)
1993–1996	Kyoto Purple Sanga	40	(3)
1997–1998	Otsuka Pharmaceutical	55	(2)
Total		95	(5)
- * Club domestic league appearances and goals

Ryoichi Fukushige (福重 良一, Fukushige Ryoichi; born January 30, 1971) is a former Japanese football player.

== Playing career ==
Fukushige was born in Wakayama Prefecture on January 30, 1971. After graduating from Osaka University of Health and Sport Sciences, he joined Japan Football League (JFL) club Kyoto Shiko (later Kyoto Purple Sanga) in 1993. He played many matches as center back and the club was promoted to J1 League in 1996. However he did not play in any matches 1996. In 1997, he moved to the JFL club Otsuka Pharmaceutical. He played as a regular player for two seasons and retired at the end of the 1998 season.

== Career statistics ==
Appearances and goals by club, season and competition
Club	Season	League			Emperor's Cup		J.League Cup		Total	
Club	Season	Division	Apps	Goals	Apps	Goals	Apps	Goals	Apps	Goals
Kyoto Shiko	1993	Football League	10	0	0	0	—		10	0
Kyoto Purple Sanga	1994	Football League	6	0	3	1	—		9	1
Kyoto Purple Sanga	1995	Football League	22	3	1	0	—		23	3
Kyoto Purple Sanga	1996	J1 League	2	0	0	0	0	0	2	0
Otsuka Pharmaceutical	1997	Football League	26	1	2	0	—		28	1
Otsuka Pharmaceutical	1998	Football League	29	1	3	0	—		32	1
Career total			95	5	9	1	0	0	104	6
