= Masaya Honda =

Japanese footballer

Masaya Honda 本田 将也
Personal information
- Full name: Masaya Honda
- Date of birth: November 20, 1973 (age 52)
- Place of birth: Osaka, Japan
- Height: 1.80 m (5 ft 11 in)
- Position: Midfielder

Youth career
- 1989–1991: Nitta High School
- 1992–1995: Kindai University

Senior career*
Years	Team	Apps	(Gls)
1996–1999	Kyoto Purple Sanga	33	(0)
Total		33	(0)
- * Club domestic league appearances and goals

Masaya Honda (本田 将也, Honda Masaya; born November 20, 1973) is a former Japanese football player.

== Playing career ==
Honda was born in Osaka Prefecture on November 20, 1973. After graduating from Kindai University, he joined the newly promoted J1 League club, Kyoto Purple Sanga, in 1996 and played many matches as a defensive midfielder during the first season. However, he did not play in any matches in 1998 and retired at the end of the 1999 season.

== Career statistics ==
Appearances and goals by club, season and competition
Club	Season	League			Emperor's Cup		J.League Cup		Total	
Club	Season	Division	Apps	Goals	Apps	Goals	Apps	Goals	Apps	Goals
Kyoto Purple Sanga	1996	J1 League	14	0	2	0	5	0	21	0
Kyoto Purple Sanga	1997	J1 League	19	0	1	0	6	0	26	0
Kyoto Purple Sanga	1998	J1 League	0	0	0	0	0	0	0	0
Kyoto Purple Sanga	1999	J1 League	0	0	0	0	0	0	0	0
Career total			33	0	3	0	11	0	47	0
