= Junior (footballer, born 1977) =

Brazilian footballer

Personal information
- Full name: Alicilio Pinto Silva Junior
- Date of birth: May 15, 1977 (age 49)
- Place of birth: Brazil
- Height: 1.80 m (5 ft 11 in)
- Position: Defender

Senior career*
Years	Team	Apps	(Gls)
1998	Kyoto Purple Sanga	27	(0)
- * Club domestic league appearances and goals

Alicilio Pinto Silva Junior (born May 15, 1977) is a former Brazilian football player.

== Playing career ==
Junior joined Japanese J1 League club Kyoto Purple Sanga in 1998. He played as regular center back with Naoto Otake. However Purple Sanga was finished at the 13th place in J1 League and he left the club end of 1998 season.

== Club statistics ==
Club performance			League		Cup		League Cup		Total	
Season	Club	League	Apps	Goals	Apps	Goals	Apps	Goals	Apps	Goals
Japan			League		Emperor's Cup		J.League Cup		Total	
1998	Kyoto Purple Sanga	J1 League	27	0	0	0	2	0	29	0
Total			27	0	0	0	2	0	29	0
