= 1998 Kyoto Purple Sanga season =

Kyoto Purple Sanga
1998 season
- Manager: Ooft; Hidehiko Shimizu
- Stadium: Nishikyogoku Athletic Stadium
- J.League: 13th
- Emperor's Cup: 3rd Round
- J.League Cup: GL-D 5th
- Top goalscorer: Hisashi Kurosaki (13)
Home colours	Away colours

1998 Kyoto Purple Sanga season

== Competitions ==
Competitions	Position
J.League	13th / 18 clubs
Emperor's Cup	3rd round
J.League Cup	GL-D 5th / 5 clubs

== Domestic results ==
=== J.League ===
21 March 1998 1-1	Júbilo Iwata	2-0	Kyoto Purple Sanga	Júbilo Iwata Stadium
JST (UTC+09)

25 March 1998 1-2	Kyoto Purple Sanga	1-0	Shimizu S-Pulse	Nishikyogoku Athletic Stadium
JST (UTC+09)

28 March 1998 1-3	Kyoto Purple Sanga	0-2	Verdy Kawasaki	Nishikyogoku Athletic Stadium
JST (UTC+09)

4 April 1998 1-4	Kashima Antlers	6-0	Kyoto Purple Sanga	Kashima Soccer Stadium
JST (UTC+09)

11 April 1998 1-5	Kyoto Purple Sanga	2-1	Vissel Kobe	Nishikyogoku Athletic Stadium
JST (UTC+09)

15 April 1998 1-6	Kashiwa Reysol	3-2 (GG) (a.e.t.)	Kyoto Purple Sanga	Hitachi Kashiwa Soccer Stadium
JST (UTC+09)

18 April 1998 1-7	Kyoto Purple Sanga	1-3	JEF United Ichihara	Toyama Athletic Stadium
JST (UTC+09)

25 April 1998 1-8	Gamba Osaka	0-1	Kyoto Purple Sanga	Osaka Expo '70 Stadium
JST (UTC+09)

29 April 1998 1-9	Kyoto Purple Sanga	1-2 (GG) (a.e.t.)	Yokohama Flügels	Nishikyogoku Athletic Stadium
JST (UTC+09)

2 May 1998 1-10	Yokohama Marinos	2-1	Kyoto Purple Sanga	International Stadium Yokohama
JST (UTC+09)

5 May 1998 1-11	Kyoto Purple Sanga	1-2	Cerezo Osaka	Kagoshima Kamoike Stadium
JST (UTC+09)

9 May 1998 1-12	Urawa Red Diamonds	2-1 (GG) (a.e.t.)	Kyoto Purple Sanga	Tokyo National Stadium
JST (UTC+09)

25 July 1998 1-13	Kyoto Purple Sanga	1-2	Sanfrecce Hiroshima	Nishikyogoku Athletic Stadium
JST (UTC+09)

29 July 1998 1-14	Nagoya Grampus Eight	3-1	Kyoto Purple Sanga	Mizuho Athletic Stadium
JST (UTC+09)

1 August 1998 1-15	Kyoto Purple Sanga	1-0 (GG) (a.e.t.)	Avispa Fukuoka	Nishikyogoku Athletic Stadium
JST (UTC+09)

5 August 1998 1-16	Bellmare Hiratsuka	1-2 (GG) (a.e.t.)	Kyoto Purple Sanga	Hiratsuka Athletics Stadium
JST (UTC+09)

8 August 1998 1-17	Kyoto Purple Sanga	4-2	Consadole Sapporo	Nishikyogoku Athletic Stadium
JST (UTC+09)

22 August 1998 2-1	Kyoto Purple Sanga	2-3	Nagoya Grampus Eight	Nishikyogoku Athletic Stadium
JST (UTC+09)

29 August 1998 2-2	Avispa Fukuoka	0-1	Kyoto Purple Sanga	Hakatanomori Football Stadium
JST (UTC+09)

5 September 1998 2-3	Kyoto Purple Sanga	1-2	Bellmare Hiratsuka	Nishikyogoku Athletic Stadium
JST (UTC+09)

12 September 1998 2-4	Consadole Sapporo	2-0	Kyoto Purple Sanga	Sapporo Atsubetsu Park Stadium
JST (UTC+09)

15 September 1998 2-5	Kyoto Purple Sanga	2-3	Júbilo Iwata	Tottori Soccer Stadium
JST (UTC+09)

19 September 1998 2-6	Shimizu S-Pulse	3-2	Kyoto Purple Sanga	Nihondaira Sports Stadium
JST (UTC+09)

23 September 1998 2-7	Verdy Kawasaki	0-2	Kyoto Purple Sanga	Tokyo National Stadium
JST (UTC+09)

26 September 1998 2-8	Kyoto Purple Sanga	0-3	Kashima Antlers	Nishikyogoku Athletic Stadium
JST (UTC+09)

3 October 1998 2-9	Vissel Kobe	0-2	Kyoto Purple Sanga	Kobe Universiade Memorial Stadium
JST (UTC+09)

14 October 1998 2-10	Kyoto Purple Sanga	2-2 (GG) (a.e.t.) (5-3 p)	Kashiwa Reysol	Nishikyogoku Athletic Stadium
JST (UTC+09)

17 October 1998 2-11	JEF United Ichihara	1-2 (GG) (a.e.t.)	Kyoto Purple Sanga	Ichihara Seaside Stadium
JST (UTC+09)

21 October 1998 2-12	Kyoto Purple Sanga	1-3	Gamba Osaka	Nishikyogoku Athletic Stadium
JST (UTC+09)

24 October 1998 2-13	Yokohama Flügels	2-3	Kyoto Purple Sanga	Kagoshima Kamoike Stadium
JST (UTC+09)

31 October 1998 2-14	Kyoto Purple Sanga	2-1	Yokohama Marinos	Nishikyogoku Athletic Stadium
JST (UTC+09)

3 November 1998 2-15	Cerezo Osaka	1-2	Kyoto Purple Sanga	Osaka Nagai Stadium
JST (UTC+09)

7 November 1998 2-16	Kyoto Purple Sanga	1-3	Urawa Red Diamonds	Nishikyogoku Athletic Stadium
JST (UTC+09)

14 November 1998 2-17	Sanfrecce Hiroshima	1-2 (GG) (a.e.t.)	Kyoto Purple Sanga	Hiroshima Big Arch
JST (UTC+09)

=== Emperor's Cup ===
1st Round	bye

6 December 1998 2nd Round	Kyoto Purple Sanga	9-0	Fukuyama University	Tochigi Green Stadium
JST (UTC+09)

13 December 1998 3rd Round	Kyoto Purple Sanga	2-3 (GG) (a.e.t.)	Avispa Fukuoka	Nishikyogoku Athletic Stadium
JST (UTC+09)

=== J.League Cup ===
GL-D-1	bye

23 May 1998 GL-D-2	Kyoto Purple Sanga	3-3	JEF United Ichihara	Nishikyogoku Athletic Stadium
JST (UTC+09)

30 May 1998 GL-D-3	Vissel Kobe	3-1	Kyoto Purple Sanga	Kobe Universiade Memorial Stadium
JST (UTC+09)

3 June 1998 GL-D-4	Kyoto Purple Sanga	1-2	Nagoya Grampus Eight	Nishikyogoku Athletic Stadium
JST (UTC+09)

6 June 1998 GL-D-5	Bellmare Hiratsuka	1-1	Kyoto Purple Sanga	Hiratsuka Athletics Stadium
JST (UTC+09)

== Player statistics ==
No.	Pos.	Nat.	Player	D.o.B. (Age)	Height / Weight	J.League		Emperor's Cup		J.League Cup		Total	
No.	Pos.	Nat.	Player	D.o.B. (Age)	Height / Weight	Apps	Goals	Apps	Goals	Apps	Goals	Apps	Goals
1	GK	(Japan)	Shigetatsu Matsunaga	August 12, 1962 (aged 35)	cm / kg	34	0						
2	DF	(Japan)	Hiroshi Noguchi	February 25, 1972 (aged 26)	cm / kg	25	1						
3	DF	(Japan)	Eiji Gaya	February 8, 1969 (aged 29)	cm / kg	0	0						
4	DF	(Japan)	Naoto Otake	October 18, 1968 (aged 29)	cm / kg	31	1						
5	DF	(Brazil)	Junior	May 15, 1977 (aged 20)	cm / kg	27	0						
6	MF	(Japan)	Teruo Iwamoto	May 2, 1972 (aged 25)	cm / kg	33	8						
7	MF	(Japan)	Hajime Moriyasu	August 23, 1968 (aged 29)	cm / kg	32	1						
8	MF	(Japan)	Takahiro Yamada	April 29, 1972 (aged 25)	cm / kg	29	1						
9	FW	(Japan)	Hisashi Kurosaki	May 8, 1968 (aged 29)	cm / kg	27	13						
10	MF	(Brazil)	Paulo Silas	August 27, 1965 (aged 32)	cm / kg	30	5						
11	FW	(Japan)	Shinji Fujiyoshi	April 3, 1970 (aged 27)	cm / kg	6	0						
12	GK	(Japan)	Minoru Kushibiki	June 10, 1967 (aged 30)	cm / kg	0	0						
13	DF	(Japan)	Shinsuke Shiotani	May 11, 1970 (aged 27)	cm / kg	15	0						
14	DF	(Japan)	Masaki Ogawa	April 3, 1975 (aged 22)	cm / kg	31	1						
15	FW	(Brazil)	Edmílson Matias	March 26, 1974 (aged 23)	cm / kg	31	12						
16	MF	(Japan)	Masaya Honda	November 20, 1973 (aged 24)	cm / kg	0	0						
17	DF	(Japan)	Shokichi Sato	April 9, 1971 (aged 26)	cm / kg	7	0						
18	DF	(Japan)	Yasunari Hiraoka	March 13, 1972 (aged 26)	cm / kg	2	0						
19	DF	(Japan)	Kensaku Omori	November 21, 1975 (aged 22)	cm / kg	14	0						
20	MF	(Japan)	Taijiro Kurita	March 3, 1975 (aged 23)	cm / kg	9	0						
21	GK	(Japan)	Masahiko Nakagawa	August 26, 1969 (aged 28)	cm / kg	0	0						
22	FW	(Japan)	Shinya Mitsuoka	April 22, 1976 (aged 21)	cm / kg	24	2						
23	MF	(Japan)	Tatsuma Yoshida	June 9, 1974 (aged 23)	cm / kg	5	0						
24	MF	(Japan)	Yoshiki Ito	November 1, 1978 (aged 19)	cm / kg	0	0						
25	DF	(Japan)	Haruhiko Sato	June 27, 1978 (aged 19)	cm / kg	0	0						
26	FW	(Japan)	Ryo Fukudome	June 26, 1978 (aged 19)	cm / kg	0	0						
27	DF	(Japan)	Michiharu Otagiri	September 2, 1978 (aged 19)	cm / kg	0	0						
28	GK	(Japan)	Naohito Hirai	July 16, 1978 (aged 19)	cm / kg	0	0						
29	FW	(Japan)	Hiroyasu Kawakatsu	September 19, 1975 (aged 22)	cm / kg	8	1						
30	DF	(Japan)	Akihiro Minami	December 10, 1979 (aged 18)	cm / kg	0	0						
31	MF	(South Korea)	Park Kang-Jo	January 24, 1980 (aged 18)	cm / kg	0	0						
32	MF	(Brazil)	Amarildo	April 9, 1974 (aged 23)	cm / kg	0	0						
32	DF	(Japan)	Takehito Suzuki	June 11, 1971 (aged 26)	cm / kg	8	1						
33	DF	(Japan)	Keiju Karashima	June 24, 1971 (aged 26)	cm / kg	1	0						

== Other pages ==
- (in Japanese) J.League official site
