= Mineiro (footballer, born 1969) =

Brazilian footballer (born 1969)

Personal information
- Full name: Marcio dos Santos Silva
- Date of birth: February 5, 1969 (age 57)
- Place of birth: Brazil
- Height: 1.78 m (5 ft 10 in)
- Position: Midfielder

Senior career*
Years	Team	Apps	(Gls)
1997	Kyoto Purple Sanga	7	(1)
- * Club domestic league appearances and goals

Marcio dos Santos Silva (born February 5, 1969) is a former Brazilian football player.

== Playing career ==
Mineiro joined Japanese J1 League club Kyoto Purple Sanga in September 1997. On September 6, he debuted as midfielder against Vissel Kobe. He played all 7 matches without one match for suspension and left the club end of 1997 season.

== Club statistics ==
Club performance			League		Cup		League Cup		Total	
Season	Club	League	Apps	Goals	Apps	Goals	Apps	Goals	Apps	Goals
Japan			League		Emperor's Cup		J.League Cup		Total	
1997	Kyoto Purple Sanga	J1 League	7	1	2	0	0	0	9	1
Total			7	1	2	0	0	0	9	1
