= Yuji Nariyama =

Japanese footballer

Yuji Nariyama 成山 裕治
Personal information
- Full name: Yuji Nariyama
- Date of birth: May 20, 1971 (age 55)
- Place of birth: Kyoto, Japan
- Height: 1.77 m (5 ft 9 1/2 in)
- Position: Defender

Youth career
- 1987–1989: Yamashiro High School
- 1990–1993: Kindai University

Senior career*
| Years | Team | Apps | (Gls) |
| 1994–1996 | Kyoto Purple Sanga | 43 | (1) |
| Total | | 43 | (1) |
- * Club domestic league appearances and goals

Yuji Nariyama (成山 裕治, Nariyama Yuji; born May 20, 1971) is a Japanese former football player.

== Playing career ==
Nariyama was born in Kyoto Prefecture on May 20, 1971. After graduating from Kindai University, he joined Japan Football League club Kyoto Purple Sanga based in his local in 1994. He played many matches as side back from first season and the club was promoted to J1 League from 1996. However his opportunity to play decreased in 1996 and he retired at the end of the 1996 season.

== Club statistics ==
| Club performance | | | League | | Cup | | League Cup | | Total | |
| Season | Club | League | Apps | Goals | Apps | Goals | Apps | Goals | Apps | Goals |
| Japan | | | League | | Emperor's Cup | | J.League Cup | | Total | |
|---|---|---|---|---|---|---|---|---|---|---|
| 1994 | Kyoto Purple Sanga | Football League | 20 | 0 | 0 | 0 | - | | 20 | 0 |
| 1995 | Kyoto Purple Sanga | Football League | 15 | 1 | 0 | 0 | - | | 15 | 1 |
| 1996 | Kyoto Purple Sanga | J1 League | 8 | 0 | 0 | 0 | 0 | 0 | 8 | 0 |
| Total | | | 43 | 1 | 0 | 0 | 0 | 0 | 43 | 1 |
