= Shinichi Morishita =

Japanese footballer

Shinichi Morishita 森下 申一
Personal information
- Full name: Shinichi Morishita
- Date of birth: 28 December 1960 (age 65)
- Place of birth: Shizuoka, Shizuoka, Japan
- Height: 1.80 m (5 ft 11 in)
- Position: Goalkeeper

Youth career
- 1976–1978: Shizuoka Gakuen High School

College career
Years	Team	Apps	(Gls)
1979–1982	Tokyo University of Agriculture		

Senior career*
Years	Team	Apps	(Gls)
1983–1994	Júbilo Iwata	243	(0)
1995–1997	Kyoto Purple Sanga	70	(0)
Total		313	(0)

International career
1985–1991	Japan	28	(0)

Managerial career
- 2021: FC Tokyo
Medal record
Júbilo Iwata
Winner	Japan Soccer League	1987/88
Runner-up	JSL Cup	1989
Runner-up	J.League Cup	1994
Runner-up	Emperor's Cup	1989
- * Club domestic league appearances and goals

Shinichi Morishita (森下 申一, Morishita Shinichi; born 28 December 1960) is a former Japanese football player. who is becoming the assistant coach of the Myanmar national football team.

== Club career ==
Morishita was born in Shizuoka on 28 December 1960. After graduating from Tokyo University of Agriculture, he joined Yamaha Motors (later Júbilo Iwata) in 1983. The club won the league champions in 1987–88 and he was selected Best Eleven. He was also selected Japanese Footballer of the Year awards in 1987. In 1992, Japan Soccer League was folded and the club joined new league Japan Football League (JFL). The club won the champions in 1992 and 2nd place in 1993. The club was promoted to J1 League from 1994. He moved to JFL club Kyoto Purple Sanga in 1995. In 1995 season, the club won the 2nd place and was promoted J1 League. He retired in 1997. He played 313 games in the league.

== National team career ==
On 4 June 1985, Morishita debuted for Japan national team against Malaysia. He also played at 1986 World Cup qualification in 1985. From 1986, he played as regular goalkeeper at 1986 Asian Games and 1988 Summer Olympics qualification in 1987. From 1988, although he deprived of regular goalkeeper by Shigetatsu Matsunaga, he played all matches included Asian Games in 1990. He played 28 games for Japan until 1991

== Club statistics ==
Club performance			League		Cup		League Cup		Total	
Season	Club	League	Apps	Goals	Apps	Goals	Apps	Goals	Apps	Goals
Japan			League		Emperor's Cup		J.League Cup		Total	
1983	Yamaha Motors	JSL Division 1	14	0					14	0
1984	Yamaha Motors	JSL Division 1	16	0					16	0
1985/86	Yamaha Motors	JSL Division 1	21	0					21	0
1986/87	Yamaha Motors	JSL Division 1	22	0					22	0
1987/88	Yamaha Motors	JSL Division 1	22	0					22	0
1988/89	Yamaha Motors	JSL Division 1	19	0					19	0
1989/90	Yamaha Motors	JSL Division 1	21	0					21	0
1990/91	Yamaha Motors	JSL Division 1	20	0			2	0	22	0
1991/92	Yamaha Motors	JSL Division 1	21	0			1	0	22	0
1992	Yamaha Motors	Football League	18	0			-		18	0
1993	Yamaha Motors	Football League	17	0	1	0	5	0	23	0
1994	Júbilo Iwata	J1 League	32	0	1	0	4	0	37	0
1995	Kyoto Purple Sanga	Football League	28	0	1	0	-		29	0
1996	Kyoto Purple Sanga	J1 League	29	0	3	0	14	0	46	0
1997	Kyoto Purple Sanga	J1 League	13	0	2	0	6	0	21	0
Total			313	0	14	0	32	0	359	0

== National team statistics ==
Japan national team
Year	Apps	Goals
1985	2	0
1986	4	0
1987	10	0
1988	2	0
1989	3	0
1990	6	0
1991	1	0
Total	28	0

== Honors ==
- Japanese Footballer of the Year: 1987
- Japan Soccer League Best Eleven: 1987–88
- Best Goalkeeper of the year (Japan Soccer League): 1987–88, 1989–90
