= Edmílson Matias =

Brazilian footballer (born 1974)

Personal information
- Full name: Edmílson Matias
- Date of birth: March 26, 1974 (age 52)
- Place of birth: Andirá, Brazil
- Height: 1.77 m (5 ft 9 1/2 in)
- Position: Forward

Senior career*
Years	Team	Apps	(Gls)
1993	Matsubara		
1994	União Bandeirante		
1995–1997	Kyoto Purple Sanga	29	(17)
1997–1999	Palmeiras	24	(5)
1998	→ Kyoto Purple Sanga (loan)	31	(12)
2000	Vitória	0	(0)
2000	Yokohama F. Marinos	23	(7)
2001	Cruzeiro	0	(0)
2001	Coritiba	22	(5)
2002	Juventude	19	(3)
2003	Figueirense	13	(2)
2004	Al-Ahli (RSA)		
2004	Santo André	0	(0)
2004	Portuguesa	?	(4)
2005	Goiás	0	(0)
2006	Guarani	?	(8)
2007	Coritiba	?	(0)
2008	Ituano	0	(0)
2009	Rio Branco (MG)	0	(0)
2010	Monte Azul	0	(0)
2011-2013	Rio Branco SC		
- * Club domestic league appearances and goals

Edmílson Matias (born 26 March 1974) is a Brazilian former footballer.

== Biography ==
In 2006, he joined Guarani, where he participated at Campeonato Paulista, Copa do Brasil 2006 and Campeonato Brasileiro Série B 2006

In 2007, he signed a 1-year contract with Coritiba, which he played at Campeonato Paranaense and Campeonato Brasileiro Série B 2007.

In 2008, he signed for Ituano at Campeonato Paulista 2008. In 2009, he moved to Andradas for Rio Branco at Campeonato Mineiro. In 2010, he joined Campeonato Paulista newcomer Monte Azul.

== Club statistics ==
Club performance			League		Cup		League Cup		Total	
Season	Club	League	Apps	Goals	Apps	Goals	Apps	Goals	Apps	Goals
Japan			League		Emperor's Cup		J.League Cup		Total	
1995	Kyoto Purple Sanga	Football League	16	13	1	0	-		17	13
1996	Kyoto Purple Sanga	J1 League	13	4	3	1	0	0	16	5
1997	Kyoto Purple Sanga	J1 League	0	0	0	0	0	0	0	0
1998	Kyoto Purple Sanga	J1 League	31	12	2	2	4	1	37	15
2000	Yokohama F. Marinos	J1 League	23	7	3	0	5	1	31	8
Total			83	36	9	3	9	2	101	41

== Honours ==
- Campeonato Brasileiro Série B: 2007
- Copa do Brasil: 2004
