= Cléber Arado =

Brazilian footballer (1972–2021)

Personal information
- Full name: Cléber Eduardo Arado
- Date of birth: 11 October 1972
- Place of birth: São José do Rio Preto, São Paulo, Brazil
- Date of death: 2 January 2021 (aged 48)
- Place of death: Curitiba, Paraná, Brazil
- Height: 1.80 m (5 ft 11 in)
- Position: Forward

Senior career*
| Years | Team | Apps | (Gls) |
| 1992–1994 | América-SP | | |
| 1995 | Mogi Mirim | | |
| 1996 | Kyoto Purple Sanga | 10 | (1) |
| 1997 | Coritiba | 18 | (10) |
| 1998 | Mérida | 17 | (3) |
| 1998 | Atlético Paranaense | | |
| 1998–2000 | Coritiba | 28 | (9) |
| 2000–2001 | Portuguesa | | |
| 2001 | Guarani | 5 | (0) |
| 2001 | Avaí | 8 | (9) |
| 2002 | Etti Jundiaí | 8 | (9) |
| 2002 | Ceará | | |
| 2002 | Portuguesa | | |
| 2003–2004 | Ceará | | |
| 2006 | Rio Preto | | |
- * Club domestic league appearances and goals

Cléber Eduardo Arado (11 October 1972 – 2 January 2021) was a Brazilian professional footballer who played as a forward.

== Career ==
Cléber Arado started his career in América Futebol Clube (SP) in São Paulo, in 1992 he started his senior career. Then he played in Mogi Mirim Esporte Clube before the start of his international career.

Cléber Arado joined Japanese J1 League club Kyoto Purple Sanga in 1997. On 8 March, he debuted as forward against Avispa Fukuoka in J.League Cup. He also scored a goal in this match.

Next season he played for Brazilian club Coritiba Foot Ball Club, then in Spanish CP Mérida. In 1998 he returned to Brazil and played for several Brazilian clubs. He ended his professional career in 2006 in Rio Preto Esporte Clube.

== Death ==
Cléber Arado died from COVID-19 in Curitiba at age 48 during the COVID-19 pandemic in Brazil, after having been hospitalized for 34 days.
