= Yosuke Sakamoto =

Japanese footballer

Yosuke Sakamoto 坂元 要介
Personal information
- Full name: Yosuke Sakamoto
- Date of birth: January 12, 1974 (age 52)
- Place of birth: Kyoto, Kyoto, Japan
- Height: 1.70 m (5 ft 7 in)
- Position: Midfielder

Youth career
- 1989–1991: Takigawa Daini High School
- 1992–1995: Doshisha University

Senior career*
Years	Team	Apps	(Gls)
1996	Kyoto Purple Sanga	7	(0)
1997–1999	Sagawa Express Osaka		
2000–2002	FC Kyoto Bamb	57	(2)
Total		64	(2)
- * Club domestic league appearances and goals

Yosuke Sakamoto (坂元 要介, Sakamoto Yosuke; born January 12, 1974) is a former Japanese football player.

== Playing career ==
Sakamoto was born in Kyoto on January 12, 1974. After graduating from Doshisha University, he joined newly was promoted to J1 League club, Kyoto Purple Sanga based in his local in 1996. He played as defensive midfielder. In 1997, he moved to Regional Leagues club Sagawa Express Osaka. In 2000, he moved to Japan Football League club FC Kyoken (later FC Kyoken Kyoto, FC Kyoto Bamb) based in his local. He played many matches in 3 seasons and retired end of 2002 season.

== Career statistics ==
Appearances and goals by club, season and competition
Club	Season	League			Emperor's Cup		J.League Cup		Total	
Club	Season	Division	Apps	Goals	Apps	Goals	Apps	Goals	Apps	Goals
Kyoto Purple Sanga	1996	J1 League	7	0	0	0	0	0	7	0
FC Kyoken	2000	Football League	15	0	-		-		15	0
FC Kyoken Kyoto	2001	Football League	28	2	2	0	-		30	2
FC Kyoto Bamb	2002	Football League	14	0	-		-		14	0
Career total			64	2	2	0	0	0	66	0
