= Yuji Kakiuchi =

Japanese footballer

Yuji Kakiuchi 垣内 友二
Personal information
- Full name: Yuji Kakiuchi
- Date of birth: August 31, 1969 (age 57)
- Place of birth: Kanagawa, Japan
- Height: 1.64 m (5 ft 4 1/2 in)
- Position: Midfielder

Youth career
- Fujisawa Kita High School

Senior career*
Years	Team	Apps	(Gls)
????	Toho Titanium		
1992–1996	Kyoto Purple Sanga	62	(3)
1997–1998	Albirex Niigata		
- * Club domestic league appearances and goals

Yuji Kakiuchi (垣内 友二, Kakiuchi Yuji; born August 31, 1969) is a former Japanese football player.

== Playing career ==
Kakiuchi was born in Kanagawa Prefecture on August 31, 1969. After graduating from high school, he joined Toho Titanium. In 1992, he moved to Kyoto Shiko (later Kyoto Purple Sanga). He played many matches until 1995 and the club was promoted to the J1 League in 1996. However, he did not play as much in 1996. In 1997, he moved to the Regional Leagues club Albirex Niigata. The club was then promoted to the Japan Football League. He retired at the end of the 1998 season.

== Career statistics ==
Appearances and goals by club, season and competition
Club	Season	League			Emperor's Cup		J.League Cup		Total	
Club	Season	Division	Apps	Goals	Apps	Goals	Apps	Goals	Apps	Goals
Kyoto Shiko	1992	Football League	17	1			-		17	1
Kyoto Shiko	1993	Football League	15	0	-		-		15	0
Kyoto Purple Sanga	1994	Football League	13	0	0	0	-		13	0
Kyoto Purple Sanga	1995	Football League	16	2	1	0	-		17	2
Kyoto Purple Sanga	1996	J1 League	1	0	0	0	0	0	1	0
Albirex Niigata	1997	Regional Leagues			1	0	-		1	0
Albirex Niigata	1998	Football League	28	4	3	0	-		31	4
Career total			90	7	5	0	0	0	95	7
