= Sérgio Soares =

Brazilian footballer and manager

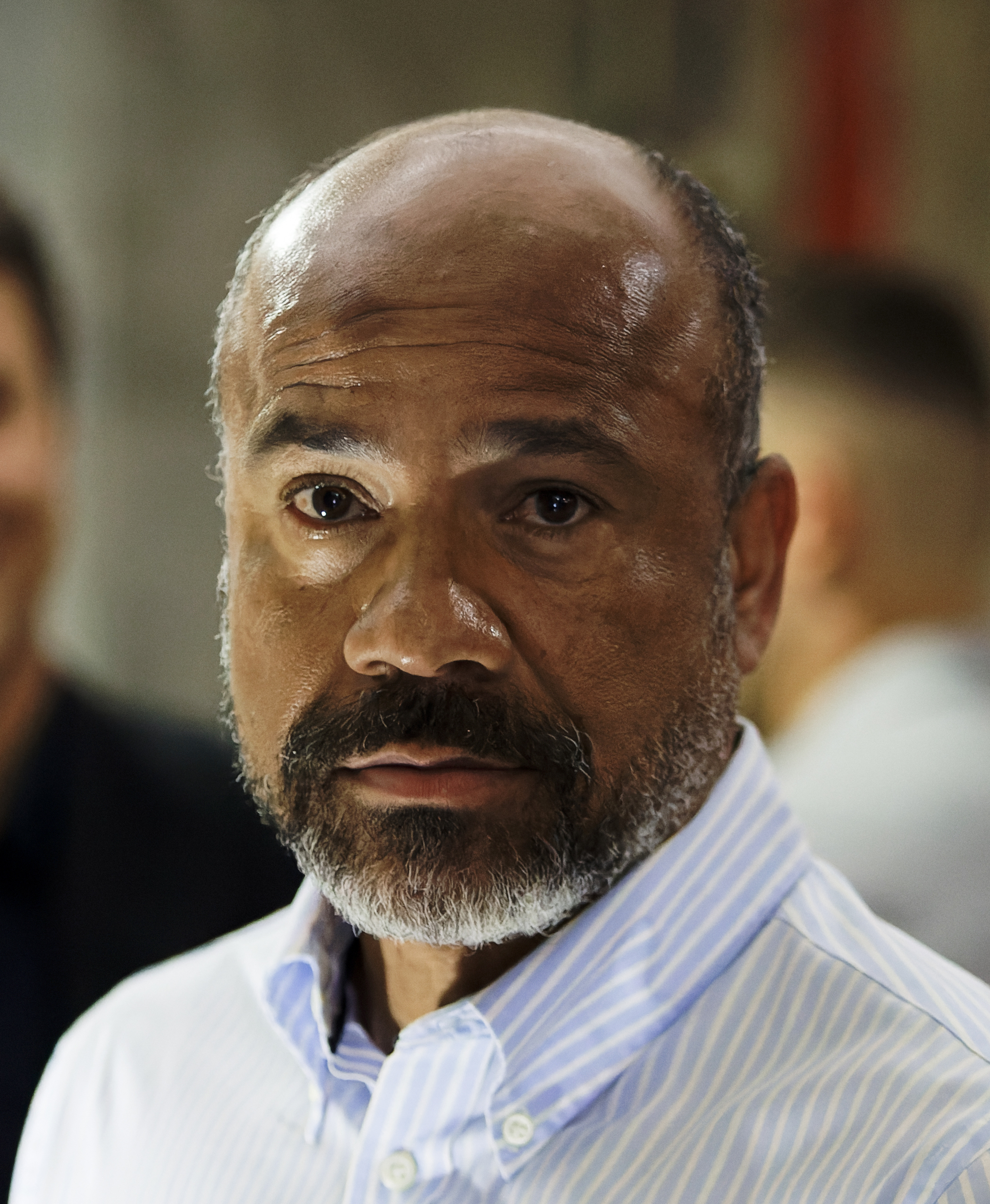
- Soares in 2023

Personal information
- Full name: Sérgio Soares da Silva
- Date of birth: 11 January 1967 (age 59)
- Place of birth: São Paulo, Brazil
- Height: 1.78 m (5 ft 10 in)
- Position: Midfielder

Team information
- Current team: Santo André (technical coordinator)

Youth career
- 1982–1985: Juventus-SP

Senior career*
Years	Team	Apps	(Gls)
1985–1992	Juventus-SP		
1992–1995	Al-Hilal		
1993	→ Juventus-SP (loan)		
1995	Guarani	14	(2)
1996–1997	Palmeiras		
1996	→ Kyoto Purple Sanga (loan)	9	(0)
1997	Goiás	5	(0)
1997	Juventus-SP		
1998–1999	Inter de Limeira	31	(2)
1998	→ Juventus-SP (loan)		
1999	Etti Jundiai		
2000	São José-SP		
2000	Gama	19	(0)
2001	Santo André		
2002	Juventus-SP		
2003	Santo André		
2003	Náutico	12	(0)
2004	Santo André		

Managerial career
- 2004: Santo André
- 2005: Santo André
- 2006: Juventus-SP
- 2006–2007: Grêmio Barueri
- 2007: Santo André
- 2008: Juventus-SP
- 2008: Santo André
- 2009: Ponte Preta
- 2009: São Caetano
- 2009: Paraná
- 2009–2010: Santo André
- 2010–2011: Atlético Paranaense
- 2011: Grêmio Barueri
- 2012: Cerezo Osaka
- 2013: Avaí
- 2013–2014: Ceará
- 2015: Bahia
- 2016: São Bernardo
- 2016: Ceará
- 2017: Santo André
- 2017: Goiás
- 2018: Santo André
- 2018: Londrina
- 2019: São Bernardo
- 2019: ABC
- 2020: Ferroviária
- 2021: Juventus-SP
- 2022: Portuguesa
- 2023: Altos
- 2023: Floresta
- 2024-2025: Juventus-SP
- * Club domestic league appearances and goals

Sérgio Soares da Silva (born 11 January 1967) is a Brazilian football coach and former player who played as a midfielder. He is the current technical coordinator of Santo André.

== Playing career ==
Born in São Paulo, Soares began his career with hometown side Juventus, making his first team debut in 1985 and being sold to Al-Hilal of Saudi Arabia in 1993. In 1996, after a short period at Guarani, he joined Palmeiras.

A backup option at Verdão, Soares was loaned to Japanese club Kyoto Purple Sanga for the remainder of the 1996 season. After featuring more sparingly in 1997, he still left the club and moved to Goiás, where he featured very rarely before returning to his first club Juventus.

Soares subsequently played for Inter de Limeira, Juventus (two stints), Etti Jundiai, São José-SP, Gama, Santo André (three stints) and Náutico. He retired in 2004 with Santo André, aged 37.

== Managerial career ==
Shortly after retiring, Soares was named assistant manager and supervisor at his last club Santo André. On 25 July 2004, he was named manager of the first team after Péricles Chamusca left.

Soares returned to his assistant role after the appointment of Luiz Carlos Ferreira for the 2005 season, but was again named manager on 14 March 2005, after Ferreira resigned. He left in December to return to his first club Juventus, now as manager.

On 26 January 2007, Soares replaced Marcelo Vilar at the helm of Grêmio Barueri, but was sacked on 8 April. He returned to Santo André on 17 May, but was dismissed on 1 November with the club struggling with relegation in the Série B.

On 21 January 2008, Soares returned to Juventus. He resigned on 29 February, and subsequently rejoined Santo André for a fourth period as manager on 16 May. He led the latter side to a top tier promotion before opting to join Ponte Preta on 4 December.

Soares left Ponte on 9 March 2009, and took over São Caetano three days later. He was sacked on 1 June, and was named in charge of Paraná five days later; he resigned on 7 September, and returned to Santo André the following day.

Soares led Santo André to the second position of the 2010 Campeonato Paulista, but resigned on 22 September after the club was in the relegation zone. On 4 October, he was named Atlético Paranaense manager, but was sacked on 3 February 2011.

Soares returned to Barueri on 11 May 2011, but was sacked on 1 August. On 6 January, he had his first managerial experience abroad after being named in charge of Japanese club Cerezo Osaka, but was relieved of his duties on 27 August and subsequently replaced by compatriot Levir Culpi.

On 6 December 2012, Soares replaced Argel Fuchs at the helm of Avaí. Sacked the following 10 March, he was named in charge of Ceará on 18 August 2013, in the place of Sérgio Guedes.

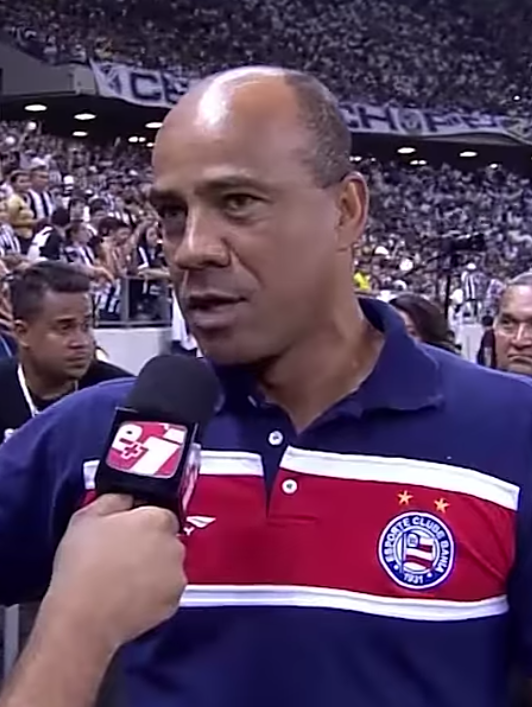
Soares in charge of Bahia in 2015

Soares resigned from Ceará on 22 October 2014, and was appointed Bahia manager on 22 December. On 6 October of the following year, after five winless matches, he was sacked, and took over São Bernardo on 26 February 2016.

Soares was announced back at Ceará on 4 April 2016, with the move being effective seven days later. On 14 November, it was announced that his contract would not be renewed, and he returned to Santo André on 28 February 2017.

On 3 April 2017, Soares agreed to become the manager of another club he represented as a player, Goiás, but was sacked on 27 May after four winless matches. He returned to Santo André for the 2018 Campeonato Paulista on 11 October 2017, and left after the competition ended.

On 29 June 2018, Soares took over Londrina also in the second level, but was dismissed on 4 August. On 11 February 2019, he returned to São Bernardo, and later moved to ABC on 15 May.

Sacked by ABC on 9 June 2019, and was appointed in charge of Ferroviária the following 17 January. He was dismissed by the latter on 27 March 2020, and returned to Juventus on 4 January 2021.

Soares was dismissed by Juventus on 4 May 2021, and was named manager of neighbouring Portuguesa for the 2022 campaign on 11 November. He won the 2022 Campeonato Paulista Série A2 with the club, before departing on 4 October of that year.

On 16 May 2023, Soares replaced Jerson Testoni at the helm of Altos in the Série C, but was sacked after just 40 days on 26 June. On 27 June, he took over fellow third division side Floresta, leaving on a mutual agreement on 8 August.

== Career statistics ==
Club	Season	League			State League		Cup		Continental		Other		Total	
Club	Season	Division	Apps	Goals	Apps	Goals	Apps	Goals	Apps	Goals	Apps	Goals	Apps	Goals
Guarani	1995	Série A	15	2	—		—		—		—		15	2
Palmeiras	1996	Série A	0	0	5	0	1	0	—		—		6	0
Palmeiras	1997	Série A	0	0	15	0	2	0	—		1 (Note: Appearance(s) in Torneio Rio – São Paulo)	0	18	0
Palmeiras	Total		0	0	20	0	3	0	—		1	0	24	0
Kyoto Purple Sanga	1996	J1 League	9	0	—		2	0	—		11 (Note: Appearance(s) in J.League Cup)	0	22	0
Goiás	1997	Série A	5	0	—		—		—		—		5	0
Inter de Limeira	1998	Paulista	—		14	2	—		—		—		14	2
Inter de Limeira	1999	Paulista	—		17	0	—		—		—		17	0
Inter de Limeira	Total		—		31	2	—		—		—		31	2
Gama	2000	Série A	19	0	—		—		—		—		19	0
Náutico	2003	Série B	12	0	—		1	0	—		—		13	0
Career total			60	0	51	2	6	0	0	0	12	0	129	2

== Managerial statistics ==
Team	From	To	Record				
Team	From	To	G	W	D	L	Win %
Cerezo Osaka	2012	2012	23	7	5	11	30.43
Total			23	7	5	11	30.43

== Titles ==
=== Player ===
Al-Hilal

- UAFA Club Cup: 1994, 1995

Palmeiras

- Campeonato Paulista: 1996

Santo André

- Copa Paulista: 2003
- Copa do Brasil: 2004

=== Manager ===
Grêmio Barueri

- Campeonato Paulista Série A2: 2006

Santo André

- Campeonato Paulista Série A2: 2008

Ceará

- Campeonato Cearense: 2014

Bahia

- Campeonato Baiano: 2015

Portuguesa

- Campeonato Paulista Série A2: 2022
