= José Alexandre =

Brazilian footballer

Personal information
- Full name: José Alexandre Alves Lindo
- Date of birth: August 15, 1973 (age 53)
- Place of birth: Santo André, Brazil
- Height: 1.77 m (5 ft 9 1/2 in)
- Position: Midfielder

Senior career*
Years	Team	Apps	(Gls)
1995	São Paulo	13	(2)
1996	Kyoto Purple Sanga	20	(3)
- * Club domestic league appearances and goals

José Alexandre Alves Lindo (born August 15, 1973) is a former Brazilian football player.

== Career ==
Alexandre played as an offensive midfielder for Mexican Primera División side Club Necaxa from 2004 to 2005.

== Career statistics ==
Appearances and goals by club, season and competition
Club	Season	League			Emperor's Cup		J.League Cup		Total	
Club	Season	Division	Apps	Goals	Apps	Goals	Apps	Goals	Apps	Goals
Kyoto Purple Sanga	1996	J1 League	20	3	0	0	9	1	29	4
Career total			20	3	0	0	9	1	29	4
