= Luiz Carlos (footballer, born 1971) =

Brazilian footballer

Personal information
- Full name: Luiz Carlos Guarnieri
- Date of birth: August 13, 1971 (age 55)
- Place of birth: Mogi Mirim, Brazil
- Height: 1.83 m (6 ft 0 in)
- Position: Defender

Senior career*
Years	Team	Apps	(Gls)
1995–1997	Kyoto Purple Sanga	72	(9)
- * Club domestic league appearances and goals

Luiz Carlos Guarnieri (born August 13, 1971) is a former Brazilian football player.

== Club statistics ==
Club performance			League		Cup		League Cup		Total	
Season	Club	League	Apps	Goals	Apps	Goals	Apps	Goals	Apps	Goals
Japan			League		Emperor's Cup		J.League Cup		Total	
1995	Kyoto Purple Sanga	Football League	24	7	1	0	-		25	7
1996	Kyoto Purple Sanga	J1 League	25	1	3	1	12	1	40	3
1997	Kyoto Purple Sanga	J1 League	23	1	0	0	6	0	29	1
Total			72	9	4	1	18	1	94	11
