= Wagner (footballer, born 1966) =

Brazilian footballer

Personal information
- Full name: Antonio Wagner de Moraes
- Date of birth: June 2, 1966 (age 60)
- Place of birth: Brazil
- Height: 1.74 m (5 ft 8 1/2 in)
- Position: Forward

Senior career*
Years	Team	Apps	(Gls)
1992	Fujita Industries		
1993–1995	Otsuka Pharmaceutical		
1996	Kashiwa Reysol		
- * Club domestic league appearances and goals

Antonio Wagner de Moraes (born June 2, 1966) is a former Brazilian football player.

== Career statistics ==
Appearances and goals by club, season and competition
Club	Season	League			Emperor's Cup		J.League Cup		Total	
Club	Season	Division	Apps	Goals	Apps	Goals	Apps	Goals	Apps	Goals
Fujita Industries	1992	Football League	16	8			—		16	8
Otsuka Pharmaceutical	1993	Football League	16	8	1	0	—		17	8
Otsuka Pharmaceutical	1994	Football League	23	20	0	0	—		23	20
Otsuka Pharmaceutical	1995	Football League	15	8	1	0	—		16	8
Kashiwa Reysol	1996	J1 League	6	2	0	0	5	1	11	3
Career total			76	46	2	0	5	1	83	47
