= Raudnei =

Brazilian footballer

Personal information
- Full name: Raudnei Anversa Freire
- Date of birth: 18 July 1965 (age 61)
- Place of birth: Echaporã, Brazil
- Height: 1.83 m (6 ft 0 in)
- Position: Forward

Senior career*
Years	Team	Apps	(Gls)
1985–87	Juventus		
1987–88	Porto	7	(2)
1989–90	Deportivo La Coruña	67	(17)
1990–91	Belenenses	14	(2)
1991–92	Gil Vicente	12	(0)
1992	Guarani		
1992–93	Castellón	17	(4)
1994	Santo André		
1994	Bahia	42	(11)
1995	Araçatuba		
1995	Bahia		
1996	Juventus		
1996	Kyoto Purple Sanga	5	(0)
1997	Juventus		
1997	America(RJ)	4	(0)
1998	Ituano		
1998	São Caetano		
1998	Paraná		
1999	Portuguesa		
1999	Juventude		
2000	União São João		
- * Club domestic league appearances and goals

Raudnei Anversa Freire (born 18 July 1965) is a former Brazilian football player.

== Honours ==
Porto

- Primeira Divisão: 1987-88

== Club statistics ==
Club performance			League		Cup		League Cup		Total	
Season	Club	League	Apps	Goals	Apps	Goals	Apps	Goals	Apps	Goals
Japan			League		Emperor's Cup		J.League Cup		Total	
1996	Kyoto Purple Sanga	J1 League	5	0	0	0	10	5	15	5
Total			5	0	0	0	10	5	15	5
