= 1995 Japan Football League =

Japan Football League
- Season: 1995
- Champions: Fukuoka Blux
- Promoted: Fukuoka Blux; Kyoto Purple Sanga
- Relegated: No relegation

Statistics of Japan Football League in the 1995 season.

== Overview ==
It was contested by 16 teams, and Fukuoka Blux won the championship. They were promoted to the J.League along with Kyoto Purple Sanga.

Newly promoted teams before the season were Brummell Sendai (now Vegalta Sendai), and Fukushima FC, which despite its name was based in Kōriyama.

== Clubs ==
The following sixteen clubs participated in Japan Football League Division 1 during the 1995 season:

- Brummell Sendai
- Cosmo Oil
- Fujitsu
- Fukuoka Flux
- Fukushima
- Honda
- Kyoto Purple Sanga
- NEC Yamagata
- NTT Kanto
- Otsuka Pharmaceutical
- Seino Transportation
- Tokyo Gas
- Toshiba
- Tosu Futures
- Ventforet Kofu
- Vissel Kobe

=== Personnel ===
Club	Head coach
Brummell Sendai	(Japan) Takekazu Suzuki
Cosmo Oil	(Japan) Yoshihiko Yamamoto
Fukuoka Flux	(Argentina) Jorge Olguín
Fujitsu	
Fukushima	
Honda	
Kyoto Purple Sanga	(Brazil) Oscar
NEC Yamagata	(Japan) Nobuhiro Ishizaki
NTT Kanto	
Otsuka Pharmaceutical	(Japan) Hajime Ishii
Seino Transportation	
Tokyo Gas	(Japan) Kiyoshi Okuma
Toshiba	(Japan) Takeo Takahashi
Tosu Futures	(South Korea) Chang Woe-ryong
Ventforet Kofu	(Japan) Yuji Tsukada
Vissel Kobe	(Scotland) Stuart Baxter

=== Foreign players ===
Club	Player 1	Player 2	Player 3	Player 4	Non-visa foreign	Former players
Brummell Sendai						
Cosmo Oil	(South Korea) Kim Byung-soo					
Fujitsu	(China) Gao Sheng				(South Korea) Shin Che-bon	
Fukuoka Flux	(Argentina) Carlos Mayor	(Argentina) Hugo Maradona	(Argentina) Nestor Omar Piccoli	(Argentina) Pedro Troglio		(Argentina) Darío Siviski
Fukushima	(South Korea) Gwak Kyung-keun					
Honda	(Brazil) Wagner Lopes	(Brazil) Walter				
Kyoto Purple Sanga	(Brazil) Baltazar	(Brazil) Edmílson Matias	(Brazil) Luiz Carlos	(Brazil) Mauricinho		(Uruguay) Mario López
NEC Yamagata	(Brazil) Aldro	(Brazil) Angelo				
NTT Kanto						
Otsuka Pharmaceutical	(Brazil) Almir	(Brazil) Wagner				
Seino Transportation						
Tokyo Gas	(Brazil) Amaral	(Cameroon) Edwin Ifeanyi				
Toshiba	(Czech Republic) Pavel Řehák	(Uruguay) Pedro Pedrucci				
Tosu Futures	(Argentina) Héctor Enrique	(Cameroon) Stephen Tataw	(Federal Republic of Yugoslavia) Zoran Milinković			(Federal Republic of Yugoslavia) Dragiša Binić
Ventforet Kofu	(Czech Republic) František Mysliveček					
Vissel Kobe	(Scotland) Lee Baxter	(Sweden) Jan Jönsson	(Switzerland) Thomas Bickel	(Tunisia) Ziad Tlemçani		

== League table ==
Pos	Club	P	W	L	GF	GA	Pts	Notes
1	Fukuoka Blux	30	24	6	83	25	72	Promoted to J.League
2	Kyoto Purple Sanga	30	23	7	74	38	70	Promoted to J.League
3	Tokyo Gas	30	20	7	66	35	61	
4	Tosu Futures	30	19	11	47	37	60	
5	Otsuka Pharmaceutical	30	19	11	53	28	57	
6	Vissel Kobe	30	18	12	53	36	55	
7	Honda	30	16	14	58	42	49	
8	Ventforet Kofu	30	14	16	54	54	43	
9	Toshiba	30	14	16	43	58	43	
10	NEC Yamagata	30	13	17	45	47	41	
11	Fujitsu	30	12	18	48	58	37	
12	Cosmo Oil	30	11	19	27	47	36	
13	Fukushima	30	11	19	24	67	33	
14	NTT Kanto	30	9	21	34	63	31	
15	Brummell Sendai	30	9	21	40	79	27	
16	Seino Transportation	30	8	22	28	62	26	

Source: RSSSF
