= Toru Kawashima =

Japanese footballer (1970–2024)

Toru Kawashima 川島 透
Personal information
- Date of birth: June 4, 1970
- Place of birth: Osaka, Japan
- Date of death: January 19, 2024 (aged 53)
- Height: 1.81 m (5 ft 11 in)
- Position: Goalkeeper

Youth career
- 1986–1988: Konko Daiichi High School
- 1989–1990: Chukyo University

Senior career*
Years	Team	Apps	(Gls)
1991–1995	Gamba Osaka		
1996–1998	Otsuka Pharmaceutical	50	(0)
- * Club domestic league appearances and goals

Toru Kawashima (川島 透, Kawashima Toru; June 4, 1970 – January 19, 2024) was a Japanese footballer who played as a goalkeeper for Otsuka Pharmaceutical.

== Career ==
Kawashima was born in Osaka Prefecture on June 4, 1970. After he dropped out of Chukyo University, he joined the Japan Soccer League club Matsushita Electric (later Gamba Osaka) in 1991. However he did not play as much as Kenji Honnami and Hayato Okanaka. In 1996, he moved to the Japan Football League club Otsuka Pharmaceutical. He played as a regular goalkeeper in 1996. However he gradually played less often during 1997 and he retired at the end of the 1998 season.

== Death ==
Kawashima died on January 19, 2024, at the age of 53.

== Career statistics ==
Appearances and goals by club, season and competition
Club	Season	League			Emperor's Cup		J.League Cup		Total	
Club	Season	Division	Apps	Goals	Apps	Goals	Apps	Goals	Apps	Goals
Gamba Osaka (Note: "Matsushita Electric" until 1992)	1991–92	JSL Division 1								
Gamba Osaka	1992	J1 League	–				0	0	0	0
Gamba Osaka	1993	J1 League	0	0	1	0	0	0	1	0
Gamba Osaka	1994	J1 League	2	0	0	0	0	0	2	0
Gamba Osaka	1995	J1 League	0	0			–		0	0
Gamba Osaka	Total									
Otsuka Pharmaceutical	1996	Football League	27	0			–		27	0
Otsuka Pharmaceutical	1997	Football League	15	0			–		15	0
Otsuka Pharmaceutical	1998	Football League	8	0			–		8	0
Otsuka Pharmaceutical	Total		50	0	1	0	0	0	50	0
Career total			52	0	1	0	0	0	53	0
