= 1995 Gamba Osaka season =

Gamba Osaka
1995 season
- Manager: Sigfried Held
- Stadium: Expo '70 Commemorative Stadium
- J.League: 14th
- Emperor's Cup: Semifinals
- Top goalscorer: League: Hans Gillhaus (20); All: Hans Gillhaus (24)
- Highest home attendance: 19,486 (vs Verdy Kawasaki, 8 July 1995)
- Lowest home attendance: 7,320 (vs Shimizu S-Pulse, 15 November 1995)
- Average home league attendance: 13,310
Home colours	Away colours

1995 Gamba Osaka season

== Review and events ==
=== League results summary ===
Overall								Home						Away					
Pld	W	D	L	GF	GA	GD	Pts	W	D	L	GF	GA	GD	W	D	L	GF	GA	GD
52	18	0	34	87	107	−20	57	11	0	15	54	55	−1	7	0	19	33	52	−19

Source: J.LEAGUE OFFICIAL RECORD & DATA 1996. ISBN 4-09-102323-1.

=== League results by round ===
J.League Suntory series (first stage)
Round	1	2	3	4	5	6	7	8	9	10	11	12	13	14	15	16	17	18	19	20	21	22	23	24	25	26
Ground	H	A	H	A	H	H	A	A	H	A	H	A	A	H	A	H	A	A	H	H	A	H	A	H	H	A
Result	W	L	W	W	W	L	W	W	L	L	W	L	L	W	L	L	L	L	L	L	L	L	W	L	W	L
Position	1	5	4	3	1	4	2	1	3	6	4	3	7	4	6	7	9	9	11	12	12	12	11	11	11	11

Source: J.LEAGUE OFFICIAL RECORD & DATA 1996. ISBN 4-09-102323-1.
A = Away; H = Home; W = Win; D = Draw; L = Loss

J.League NICOS series (second stage)
Round	1	2	3	4	5	6	7	8	9	10	11	12	13	14	15	16	17	18	19	20	21	22	23	24	25	26
Ground	A	H	A	H	A	H	A	A	H	H	A	H	A	A	H	A	H	A	H	H	A	A	H	A	H	H
Result	L	L	L	W	L	L	L	L	W	L	W	L	L	L	L	L	W	W	L	L	W	L	W	L	W	L
Position	8	12	12	10	12	14	14	14	14	14	13	13	14	14	14	14	14	13	13	13	13	13	13	13	13	13

Source: J.LEAGUE OFFICIAL RECORD & DATA 1996. ISBN 4-09-102323-1.
A = Away; H = Home; W = Win; D = Draw; L = Loss

== Competitions ==
Competitions	Position
J.League	14th / 14 clubs
Emperor's Cup	Semifinals

== Domestic results ==
=== J.League ===
18 March 1995 1st-1	Gamba Osaka	3–1	Nagoya Grampus Eight	Expo '70 Commemorative Stadium
15:02 JST (UTC+09)	Yamaguchi 45'; Protassov 72'; Isogai 75'	J. League	Stojković 53'	Attendance: 14,007; Referee: Juan Carlos Crespi; Assistant referees: Yoshikazu Hiroshima, Takashi Kunori; Fourth official: Tsuyoshi Miyake; Man of the Match: Toshihiro Yamaguchi

22 March 1995 1st-2	Júbilo Iwata	2–1	Gamba Osaka	Júbilo Iwata Stadium
18:59 JST (UTC+09)	Nakayama 12'; Schillaci 68'	J. League	Morioka 75'	Attendance: 16,078; Referee: Lutz Fröhlich; Assistant referees: Hitoshi Yamada, Yasushi Tsuchimoto; Fourth official: Tōru Nagata

25 March 1995 1st-3	Gamba Osaka	2–0	Urawa Red Diamonds	Expo '70 Commemorative Stadium
14:59 JST (UTC+09)	Isogai 51'; Morioka 68'	J. League		Attendance: 13,356; Referee: Shinichirō Obata; Assistant referees: Kazuo Kakihana, Mitsuyoshi Nakaguma; Fourth official: Sōichirō Kaneko; Man of the Match: Shigeru Morioka

29 March 1995 1st-4	Bellmare Hiratsuka	3–5	Gamba Osaka	Hiratsuka Stadium
19:00 JST (UTC+09)	Betinho 8', 29'; Noguchi 26'	J. League	Isogai 16' (pen.), 29'; Protassov 62', 68'; Aleinikov 77'	Attendance: 11,540; Referee: Yoshimi Ogawa; Assistant referees: Yasushi Tsuchimoto, Takuji Fukazawa; Fourth official: Ryū Tetsusashi; Man of the Match: Protassov

1 April 1995 1st-5	Gamba Osaka	4–0	Yokohama Marinos	Expo '70 Commemorative Stadium
15:00 JST (UTC+09)	Kondō 22', 26'; Y. Matsuyama 54'; Protassov 64'	J. League		Attendance: 17,749; Referee: Masayoshi Okada; Assistant referees: Sōichirō Kaneko, Naoyuki Mori; Fourth official: Tsuyoshi Miyake; Man of the Match: Kōji Kondō

5 April 1995 1st-6	Gamba Osaka	0–3	Sanfrecce Hiroshima	Expo '70 Commemorative Stadium
19:00 JST (UTC+09)		J. League	Noh 4', 29'; Katanosaka 71'	Attendance: 11,332; Referee: Yoshitsugu Katayama; Assistant referees: Yoshikazu Hiroshima, Akio Okutani; Fourth official: Sōichirō Kaneko

8 April 1995 1st-7	Kashiwa Reysol	2–4	Gamba Osaka	Kashiwa Hitachi Stadium
14:59 JST (UTC+09)	Tanada 10'; Müller 44'	J. League	Protassov 22'; Y. Matsuyama 41'; Gillhaus 44', 61'	Attendance: 14,450; Referee: Keiichi Sunakawa; Assistant referees: Takeshi Ōkura, Ichirō Inukai; Fourth official: Masahiko Tsuma; Man of the Match: Takahiro Shimada

12 April 1995 1st-8	Shimizu S-Pulse	1–3	Gamba Osaka	Nihondaira Sports Stadium
19:00 JST (UTC+09)	Yoshida 89'	J. League	Aleinikov 45', 73'; Gillhaus 57'	Attendance: 18,036; Referee: Kenji Tanaka; Assistant referees: Yasuhiro Hemmi, Yoshikazu Hiroshima; Fourth official: Toshiyuki Asanuma; Man of the Match: Aleinikov

15 April 1995 1st-9	Gamba Osaka	1–3	Kashima Antlers	Expo '70 Commemorative Stadium
15:03 JST (UTC+09)	Yamaguchi 30' (pen.)	J. League	Leonardo 26'; Sōma 45'; Santos 70'	Attendance: 17,769; Referee: Hiroyuki Umemoto; Assistant referees: Hiroshi Tanabe, Akio Okutani; Fourth official: Tsuyoshi Miyake

22 April 1995 1st-10	Verdy Kawasaki	1–0	Gamba Osaka	Kawasaki Todoroki Stadium
19:04 JST (UTC+09)	Takeda 48'	J. League		Attendance: 12,713; Referee: Shinichirō Obata; Assistant referees: Takeshi Ōkura, Tetsu Karakida; Fourth official: Hiroshi Yashiro

26 April 1995 1st-11	Gamba Osaka	3–2 (V-goal) (a.e.t.)	Yokohama Flügels	Expo '70 Commemorative Stadium
19:03 JST (UTC+09)	Protassov 72' 108'; Hiraoka 85'	J. League	Mitsuoka 2'; Harada 74'	Attendance: 12,236; Referee: Kenji Tanaka; Assistant referees: Yasuhiro Hemmi, Sōichirō Kaneko; Fourth official: Kazuo Kakihana; Man of the Match: Kenji Honnami

29 April 1995 1st-12	JEF United Ichihara	2–2 (V-goal) (a.e.t.) (4–3 p)	Gamba Osaka	Tecnoport Fukui Stadium
14:03 JST (UTC+09)	Rufer 48'; Jō 89'	J. League	Yamaguchi 26'; Protassov 70'	Attendance: 9,495; Referee: Yōtarō Moritsu; Assistant referees: Yoshikazu Hiroshima, Yasushi Tsuchimoto; Fourth official: Masao Nakajō
	Penalties
	(penalty scored) Rufer; (penalty scored) Jō; (penalty scored) Ejiri; (penalty missed) Y. Gotō; (penalty scored) Maslovar		(penalty scored) Morioka; (penalty scored) Yamaguchi; (penalty scored) Isogai; (penalty missed) Tsveiba; (penalty missed) Protassov

3 May 1995 1st-13	Cerezo Osaka	1–0	Gamba Osaka	Osaka Nagai No.2 Stadium
15:05 JST (UTC+09)	Valdés 54'	J. League		Attendance: 13,057; Referee: Juan Carlos Crespi; Assistant referees: Kazuo Kakihana, Tōru Kamikawa; Fourth official: Tsuyoshi Miyake

6 May 1995 1st-14	Gamba Osaka	5–1	Júbilo Iwata	Expo '70 Commemorative Stadium
15:02 JST (UTC+09)	Yamaguchi 26'; Gillhaus 47', 58'; 65' (o.g.); Protassov 88'	J. League	Nakayama 83'	Attendance: 17,815; Referee: Hiroyuki Umemoto; Assistant referees: Kazuya Yanagisawa, Mitsuyoshi Nakaguma; Fourth official: Tsuyoshi Miyake; Man of the Match: Yūji Hashimoto

10 May 1995 1st-15	Urawa Red Diamonds	4–2	Gamba Osaka	Omiya Football Stadium
19:02 JST (UTC+09)	Fukuda 10', 75'; Bein 58'; Tsuchihashi 89'	J. League	Yamaguchi 32'; Gillhaus 89'	Attendance: 9,589; Referee: Tetsuya Hamana; Assistant referees: Toshiyuki Mayuzumi, Takashi Kunori; Fourth official: Izumi Okada

13 May 1995 1st-16	Gamba Osaka	2–4	Bellmare Hiratsuka	Kyoto Nishikyogoku Stadium
16:03 JST (UTC+09)	Protassov 48'; Isogai 83' (pen.)	J. League	Almir 35'; Takada 78'; Sorimachi 79'; Betinho 89' (pen.)	Attendance: 15,119; Referee: Armando Perez; Assistant referees: Morihisa Yamaguchi, Kazuaki Hamaguchi; Fourth official: Hiroyuki Ishida

17 June 1995 1st-17	Yokohama Marinos	3–1	Gamba Osaka	Yokohama Mitsuzawa Football Stadium
19:03 JST (UTC+09)	Jinno 50'; Medina Bello 73', 89'	J. League	Gillhaus 86'	Attendance: 13,145; Referee: Juan Carlos Crespi; Assistant referees: Kazuaki Hamaguchi, Toshiyuki Mayuzumi; Fourth official: Kazuhiko Uchida

21 June 1995 1st-18	Sanfrecce Hiroshima	1–0	Gamba Osaka	Hiroshima Stadium
19:00 JST (UTC+09)	Hašek 36'	J. League		Attendance: 8,667; Referee: Lutz Fröhlich; Assistant referees: Hiroshi Tanabe, Tōru Kamikawa; Fourth official: Satoru Yamada

24 June 1995 1st-19	Gamba Osaka	1–3	Kashiwa Reysol	Kobe Universiade Memorial Stadium
16:00 JST (UTC+09)	Hiraoka 60'	J. League	Careca 58'; Nelsinho 75'; Tanada 84'	Attendance: 14,811; Referee: Yoshimi Ogawa; Assistant referees: Yoshikazu Hiroshima, Hiroyuki Izumi; Fourth official: Keiji Hayashi

28 June 1995 1st-20	Gamba Osaka	4–5 (V-goal) (a.e.t.)	Shimizu S-Pulse	Expo '70 Commemorative Stadium
19:00 JST (UTC+09)	Protassov 16', 58', 89'; Morioka 44'	J. League	Toninho 37' 108' (pen.); Dias 55', 57'; Miura 76'	Attendance: 15,752; Referee: Armando Perez; Assistant referees: Kazuaki Hamaguchi, Morihisa Yamaguchi; Fourth official: Kazuo Kakihana

1 July 1995 1st-21	Kashima Antlers	2–1	Gamba Osaka	Ishikawa Kanazawa Stadium
19:02 JST (UTC+09)	Santos 3'; Hasegawa 24'	J. League	Gillhaus 32'	Attendance: 18,746; Referee: Yōtarō Moritsu; Assistant referees: Kazuya Yanagisawa, Kōji Taniuchi; Fourth official: Tsutomu Kaji

8 July 1995 1st-22	Gamba Osaka	0–1	Verdy Kawasaki	Expo '70 Commemorative Stadium
19:00 JST (UTC+09)		J. League	Hashiratani 58'	Attendance: 19,486; Referee: Lutz Fröhlich; Assistant referees: Peter Augar, Olaf Blumenstein; Fourth official: Tsuyoshi Miyake

12 July 1995 1st-23	Yokohama Flügels	1–4	Gamba Osaka	Kagoshima Kamoike Stadium
19:03 JST (UTC+09)	Rodrigo 82'	J. League	Gillhaus 2', 72'; Morioka 44'; Kondō 50'	Attendance: 10,148; Referee: Fumikazu Shioyazono; Assistant referees: Peter Augar, Tōru Kamikawa; Fourth official: Takayuki Kamiyama; Man of the Match: Gillhaus

15 July 1995 1st-24	Gamba Osaka	0–5	JEF United Ichihara	Expo '70 Commemorative Stadium
19:00 JST (UTC+09)		J. League	Niimura 43', 61', 71'; Rufer 49'; Maslovar 80'	Attendance: 17,883; Referee: Yoshitsugu Katayama; Assistant referees: Sōichirō Kaneko, Naoki Esumi; Fourth official: Akio Okutani

19 July 1995 1st-25	Gamba Osaka	1–0	Cerezo Osaka	Expo '70 Commemorative Stadium
19:00 JST (UTC+09)	Aleinikov 73'	J. League		Attendance: 17,565; Referee: Kenji Tanaka; Assistant referees: Tōru Yamashiro, Akio Okutani; Fourth official: Kazuo Kakihana; Man of the Match: Aleinikov

22 July 1995 1st-26	Nagoya Grampus Eight	3–0	Gamba Osaka	Nagoya Mizuho Athletics Stadium
19:01 JST (UTC+09)	Hirano 32'; Nakanishi 83'; Okayama 85'	J. League		Attendance: 21,816; Referee: Yōtarō Moritsu; Assistant referees: Morihisa Yamaguchi, Satoru Kawano; Fourth official: Akihiko Kakei

12 August 1995 2nd-1	JEF United Ichihara	2–1 (V-goal) (a.e.t.)	Gamba Osaka	Sapporo Atsubetsu Stadium
12:00 JST (UTC+09)	Jō 54' 93'	J. League	Yamaguchi 59'	Attendance: 9,518; Referee: Hideo Kikuchi; Assistant referees: Kazuaki Hamaguchi, Tetsu Karakida; Fourth official: Eiji Kaneda

16 August 1995 2nd-2	Gamba Osaka	3–4 (V-goal) (a.e.t.)	Kashiwa Reysol	Expo '70 Commemorative Stadium
19:00 JST (UTC+09)	Aleinikov 23'; Gillhaus 70'; Yamaguchi 88'	J. League	Tanada 20' 93'; Sugano 44'; Hashiratani 67'	Attendance: 10,078; Referee: Zoran Petrović; Assistant referees: Kazuya Yanagisawa, Hideaki Harada; Fourth official: Kazuo Kakihana

19 August 1995 2nd-3	Nagoya Grampus Eight	3–1	Gamba Osaka	Gifu Nagaragawa Stadium
19:03 JST (UTC+09)	Ogura 11'; Asano 35'; Nakanishi 79'	J. League	Tsveiba 36'	Attendance: 21,734; Referee: Alfredo Trentalange; Assistant referees: Yasuhiro Matsuzaki, Naoyuki Mori; Fourth official: Katsuyasu Masui

23 August 1995 2nd-4	Gamba Osaka	5–2	Sanfrecce Hiroshima	Expo '70 Commemorative Stadium
19:02 JST (UTC+09)	Yamaguchi 13'; Aleinikov 19'; Isogai 40' (pen.); Morioka 79'; Kitamura 84'	J. League	Van Loen 5'; Hašek 38'	Attendance: 9,440; Referee: Yōtarō Moritsu; Assistant referees: Yasushi Tsuchimoto, Mitsuyoshi Nakaguma; Fourth official: Kazuo Kakihana; Man of the Match: Hiromitsu Isogai

26 August 1995 2nd-5	Kashima Antlers	4–0	Gamba Osaka	Kashima Soccer Stadium
18:04 JST (UTC+09)	Hasegawa 27', 61', 74'; Masuda 80'	J. League		Attendance: 16,110; Referee: Tatsumi Ōno; Assistant referees: Takashi Kunori, Masato Nogami; Fourth official: Kazuhiko Kumagai

2 September 1995 2nd-6	Gamba Osaka	1–4	Urawa Red Diamonds	Expo '70 Commemorative Stadium
19:00 JST (UTC+09)	Gillhaus 56'	J. League	Bein 42', 84'; Fukuda 53', 89'	Attendance: 15,181; Referee: Hiroyuki Umemoto; Assistant referees: Naoyuki Mori, Mikio Fukuoka; Fourth official: Tsuyoshi Miyake

6 September 1995 2nd-7	Verdy Kawasaki	2–0	Gamba Osaka	Kawasaki Todoroki Stadium
19:03 JST (UTC+09)	Bismarck 61'; Miura 81'	J. League		Attendance: 16,455; Referee: Yoshimi Ogawa; Assistant referees: Yū Nakamura, Ichirō Inukai; Fourth official: Haruo Suzuki

9 September 1995 2nd-8	Yokohama Flügels	2–1 (V-goal) (a.e.t.)	Gamba Osaka	Yokohama Mitsuzawa Football Stadium
19:03 JST (UTC+09)	12' (o.g.); Zinho 109' (pen.)	J. League	Isogai 24'	Attendance: 11,188; Referee: Zoran Petrović; Assistant referees: Kazuaki Hamaguchi, Kimio Izaki; Fourth official: Katsumi Ishii

13 September 1995 2nd-9	Gamba Osaka	3–2 (V-goal) (a.e.t.)	Bellmare Hiratsuka	Expo '70 Commemorative Stadium
19:03 JST (UTC+09)	Isogai 29'; Aleinikov 37'; Gillhaus 108'	J. League	Takada 43'; Natsuka 59'	Attendance: 7,563; Referee: Alfredo Trentalange; Assistant referees: Yoshikazu Hiroshima, Tetsu Karakida; Fourth official: Akio Okutani; Man of the Match: Noritada Saneyoshi

16 September 1995 2nd-10	Gamba Osaka	1–2	Yokohama Marinos	Expo '70 Commemorative Stadium
19:05 JST (UTC+09)	Isogai 28'	J. League	T. Yamada 39'; 41' (o.g.)	Attendance: 15,639; Referee: Masayoshi Okada; Assistant referees: Yasuhiro Hemmi, Akio Okutani; Fourth official: Kazuo Kakihana

23 September 1995 2nd-11	Shimizu S-Pulse	0–1 (V-goal) (a.e.t.)	Gamba Osaka	Nihondaira Sports Stadium
16:03 JST (UTC+09)		J. League	Gillhaus 96'	Attendance: 19,209; Referee: Tetsuya Hamana; Assistant referees: Naoyuki Mori, Mikio Fukuoka; Fourth official: Naoki Uchiyama; Man of the Match: Kenji Honnami

27 September 1995 2nd-12	Gamba Osaka	2–3	Júbilo Iwata	Kobe Universiade Memorial Stadium
19:04 JST (UTC+09)	Gillhaus 41', 60'	J. League	Nakayama 67'; Nanami 72'; Matsubara 89'	Attendance: 7,774; Referee: Alfredo Trentalange; Assistant referees: Morihisa Yamaguchi, Satoru Kawano; Fourth official: Akira Hinayama

30 September 1995 2nd-13	Cerezo Osaka	3–2	Gamba Osaka	Osaka Nagai No.2 Stadium
15:04 JST (UTC+09)	Bernardo 5'; Marquinhos 76'; Morishima 87'	J. League	Isogai 34', 67'	Attendance: 12,049; Referee: Yoshitsugu Katayama; Assistant referees: Hideaki Harada, Hiroyuki Izumi; Fourth official: Tsuyoshi Miyake

4 October 1995 2nd-14	Kashiwa Reysol	3–0	Gamba Osaka	Kashiwa Hitachi Stadium
19:00 JST (UTC+09)	Bentinho 42'; Valdir 60'; Yokoyama 75'	J. League		Attendance: 10,038; Referee: Fumikazu Shioyazono; Assistant referees: Mitsuru Satō, Toshiyuki Mayuzumi; Fourth official: Terunobu Kakinuma

7 October 1995 2nd-15	Gamba Osaka	1–2 (V-goal) (a.e.t.)	Nagoya Grampus Eight	Saga Stadium
17:00 JST (UTC+09)	Isogai 43' (pen.)	J. League	Stojković 39' (pen.); Okayama 94'	Attendance: 8,008; Referee: Tatsumi Ōno; Assistant referees: Hideaki Harada, Tōru Yamashiro; Fourth official: Kōki Ōba

14 October 1995 2nd-16	Sanfrecce Hiroshima	5–0	Gamba Osaka	Hiroshima Big Arch
15:05 JST (UTC+09)	Takagi 16'; Moriyama 22'; Noh 56', 85'; Van Loen 76'	J. League		Attendance: 10,912; Referee: Kiyoshi Ōta; Assistant referees: Yasuhiro Hemmi, Akihisa Makino; Fourth official: Kōji Ueno

18 October 1995 2nd-17	Gamba Osaka	3–1	Kashima Antlers	Expo '70 Commemorative Stadium
19:00 JST (UTC+09)	Yamamura 11'; Gillhaus 54', 62'	J. League	Leonardo 83' (pen.)	Attendance: 12,820; Referee: Shinichirō Obata; Assistant referees: Yoshikazu Hiroshima, Akio Okutani; Fourth official: Tsuyoshi Miyake; Man of the Match: Kōji Kondō

21 October 1995 2nd-18	Urawa Red Diamonds	0–1	Gamba Osaka	Urawa Komaba Stadium
15:01 JST (UTC+09)		J. League	Isogai 63' (pen.)	Attendance: 19,712; Referee: Naotsugu Fuse; Assistant referees: Kimio Izaki, Ichirō Inukai; Fourth official: Shigeru Kimura; Man of the Match: Kenji Honnami

1 November 1995 2nd-19	Gamba Osaka	1–3	Verdy Kawasaki	Kobe Universiade Memorial Stadium
19:04 JST (UTC+09)	Y. Matsuyama 63'	J. League	Ramos 16'; Miura 54'; Takeda 78'	Attendance: 17,009; Referee: Kazuo Kakihana; Assistant referees: Kazuya Yanagisawa, Sōichirō Kaneko; Fourth official: Tsuneo Murakami

4 November 1995 2nd-20	Gamba Osaka	0–1	Yokohama Flügels	Expo '70 Commemorative Stadium
14:59 JST (UTC+09)		J. League	Evair 74'	Attendance: 11,462; Referee: Armando Perez; Assistant referees: Sōichirō Kaneko, Tōru Kamikawa; Fourth official: Tsuyoshi Miyake

8 November 1995 2nd-21	Bellmare Hiratsuka	1–3	Gamba Osaka	Hiratsuka Stadium
19:03 JST (UTC+09)	Noguchi 19'	J. League	Hiraoka 18', 28'; Škrinjar 87'	Attendance: 8,320; Referee: Jamal Al-Sharif; Assistant referees: Yasuhiro Matsuzaki, Ichirō Inukai; Fourth official: Jōji Kashihara; Man of the Match: Naoki Hiraoka

11 November 1995 2nd-22	Yokohama Marinos	0–0 (V-goal) (a.e.t.) (3–1 p)	Gamba Osaka	Yokohama Mitsuzawa Football Stadium
15:00 JST (UTC+09)		J. League		Attendance: 11,851; Referee: Keiichi Sunakawa; Assistant referees: Takashi Kunori, Mikio Fukuoka; Fourth official: Kenji Ōgiya
	Penalties
	(penalty missed) Bisconti; (penalty scored) Matsuhashi; (penalty scored) M. Suzuki; (penalty scored) Medina Bello		(penalty missed) Škrinjar; (penalty missed) Tsveiba; (penalty scored) Y. Matsuyama; (penalty missed) Saneyoshi

15 November 1995 2nd-23	Gamba Osaka	3–2 (V-goal) (a.e.t.)	Shimizu S-Pulse	Expo '70 Commemorative Stadium
19:03 JST (UTC+09)	Gillhaus 41'; 51' (o.g.); Y. Matsuyama 106'	J. League	Marco 24'; Yoshida 50'	Attendance: 7,320; Referee: Zoran Petrović; Assistant referees: Sōichirō Kaneko, Akio Okutani; Fourth official: Yoshikazu Hiroshima; Man of the Match: Gillhaus

18 November 1995 2nd-24	Júbilo Iwata	1–0 (V-goal) (a.e.t.)	Gamba Osaka	Júbilo Iwata Stadium
16:02 JST (UTC+09)	Matsubara 103'	J. League		Attendance: 15,345; Referee: Jamal Al-Sharif; Assistant referees: Kazuaki Hamaguchi, Hiroyuki Izumi; Fourth official: Toshiaki Futamata

22 November 1995 2nd-25	Gamba Osaka	4–0	Cerezo Osaka	Expo '70 Commemorative Stadium
19:00 JST (UTC+09)	Gillhaus 18'; Hiraoka 52'; Yamaguchi 60'; Aleinikov 62'	J. League		Attendance: 9,016; Referee: Tatsumi Ōno; Assistant referees: Kazuya Yanagisawa, Mitsuyoshi Nakaguma; Fourth official: Hiroyuki Umemoto; Man of the Match: Hiromitsu Isogai

25 November 1995 2nd-26	Gamba Osaka	1–1 (V-goal) (a.e.t.) (4–5 p)	JEF United Ichihara	Expo '70 Commemorative Stadium
15:00 JST (UTC+09)	Kondō 38'	J. League	Y. Gotō 48'	Attendance: 9,864; Referee: Zoran Petrović; Assistant referees: Yoshikazu Hiroshima, Akio Okutani; Fourth official: Tsuyoshi Miyake
	Penalties
	(penalty scored) Y. Matsuyama; (penalty missed) Yamaguchi; (penalty missed) Gillhaus; (penalty scored) Miyamoto; (penalty scored) Morioka; (penalty missed) Hiraoka; (penalty scored) Hashimoto; (penalty missed) Kondō		(penalty missed) Ejiri; (penalty scored) Mutō; (penalty scored) Maslovar; (penalty scored) Akiba; (penalty missed) Manaka; (penalty missed) Shimokawa; (penalty scored) Sandro; (penalty scored) T. Gotō

=== Emperor's Cup ===
3 December 1995 1st Round	Gamba Osaka	3–1	Hokuriku Electric Power	Niigata Stadium
: JST (UTC+09)	Gillhaus ?', ?'; Isogai ?'		Morimoto ?'	Attendance: 2,637

10 December 1995 2nd Round	Gamba Osaka	4–1	Brummell Sendai	Kyoto Nishikyogoku Stadium
: JST (UTC+09)	Isogai ?', ?', ?'; Gillhaus ?'		Abe ?'	Attendance: 3,233

17 December 1995 Quarterfinals	Urawa Red Diamonds	1–2 (V-goal) (a.e.t.)	Gamba Osaka	Expo '70 Commemorative Stadium
13:00 JST (UTC+09)	Fukuda 44'		Aleinikov 1'; Gillhaus 110'	Attendance: 7,326; Referee: Yoshimi Ogawa

23 December 1995 Semifinals	Gamba Osaka	1–2	Sanfrecce Hiroshima	Kobe Universiade Memorial Stadium
: JST (UTC+09)	Kondō ?'		Takagi ?'; Huistra ?'	Attendance: 15,526

== Player statistics ==
No.	Pos	Nat	Player	Total		J-League		Emperor's Cup	
No.	Pos	Nat	Player	Apps	Goals	Apps	Goals	Apps	Goals
	GK	(Japan) JPN	Kenji Honnami	53	0	49	0	4	0
	GK	(Japan) JPN	Atsushi Shirai	1	0	1	0	0	0
	GK	(Japan) JPN	Hayato Okanaka	5	0	5	0	0	0
	GK	(Japan) JPN	Tōru Kawashima	0	0	0	0	0	0
	DF	(Japan) JPN	Takahiro Shimada	41	0	38	0	3	0
	DF	(Ukraine) UKR	Akhrik Tsveiba	40	1	40	1	0	0
	DF	(Japan) JPN	Yūji Hashimoto	39	0	37	0	2	0
	DF	(Japan) JPN	Shōji Nonoshita	0	0	0	0	0	0
	DF	(Japan) JPN	Keiju Karashima	14	0	14	0	0	0
	DF	(Japan) JPN	Takashi Kiyama	1	0	1	0	0	0
	DF	(Japan) JPN	Noritada Saneyoshi	35	0	31	0	4	0
	DF	(Japan) JPN	Kaoru Asano	0	0	0	0	0	0
	DF	(Japan) JPN	Takehiro Katō	0	0	0	0	0	0
	DF	(Japan) JPN	Tomohiro Mori	0	0	0	0	0	0
	DF	(Japan) JPN	Tsuneyasu Miyamoto	15	0	11	0	4	0
	MF	(Belarus) BLR	Sergei Aleinikov	40	9	36	8	4	1
	MF	(Japan) JPN	Masahiro Wada	12	0	12	0	0	0
	MF	(Japan) JPN	Kunio Kitamura	18	1	18	1	0	0
	MF	(Japan) JPN	Hiromitsu Isogai	41	17	37	13	4	4
	MF	(Croatia) CRO	Vjekoslav Škrinjar	19	1	15	1	4	0
	MF	(Japan) JPN	Masayuki Mita	0	0	0	0	0	0
	MF	(Japan) JPN	Sōjirō Ishii	6	0	6	0	0	0
	MF	(Japan) JPN	Masafumi Nakaguchi	0	0	0	0	0	0
	MF	(Japan) JPN	Kōji Kondō	47	5	43	4	4	1
	MF	(Japan) JPN	Hitoshi Morishita	14	0	13	0	1	0
	MF	(Japan) JPN	Akira Kubota	0	0	0	0	0	0
	MF	(Japan) JPN	Naoki Hiraoka	38	5	34	5	4	0
	MF	(Japan) JPN	Taizō Komai	0	0	0	0	0	0
	MF	(Japan) JPN	Shigeru Morioka	45	5	45	5	0	0
	MF	(Japan) JPN	Kazuya Matsuda	5	0	5	0	0	0
	MF	(Japan) JPN	Masao Kiba	32	0	28	0	4	0
	MF	(Japan) JPN	Hideki Nomiyama	0	0	0	0	0	0
	MF	(Japan) JPN	Kenji Takagi	0	0	0	0	0	0
	MF	(Japan) JPN	Akio Matsuyama	0	0	0	0	0	0
	FW	(Netherlands) NED	Hans Gillhaus	41	24	37	20	4	4
	FW	(Ukraine) UKR	Oleh Protasov	28	13	28	13	0	0
	FW	(Japan) JPN	Yoshiyuki Matsuyama	30	4	26	4	4	0
	FW	(Japan) JPN	Toshihiro Yamaguchi	41	9	41	9	0	0
	FW	(Japan) JPN	Hirohito Nakamura	1	0	1	0	0	0
	FW	(Japan) JPN	Hiroto Yamamura	12	1	10	1	2	0
	FW	(Japan) JPN	Masanobu Matsunami	15	0	15	0	0	0
	FW	(Japan) JPN	Kensuke Nishijima	0	0	0	0	0	0

- † player(s) joined the team after the opening of this season.

== Transfers ==
In:

No.	Pos.	Nation	Player
—	DF	JPN	Noritada Saneyoshi (from Ritsumeikan University)
—	DF	JPN	Tsuneyasu Miyamoto (from Gamba Osaka youth)
—	MF	CRO	Vjekoslav Škrinjar (from Croatia Zagreb)
—	MF	JPN	Masafumi Nakaguchi (from Osaka University of Commerce)
—	MF	JPN	Hitoshi Morishita (from Juntendo University)
—	MF	JPN	Hideki Nomiyama (from Kyushu Sangyo University)
—	MF	JPN	Kenji Takagi (from Gamba Osaka youth)
—	MF	JPN	Akio Matsuyama (from Gamba Osaka youth)

Out:

No.	Pos.	Nation	Player
—	GK	JPN	Kiyoshi Fujii
—	DF	JPN	Tetsuya Ogura (to Kyoto Purple Sanga)
—	DF	JPN	Takashi Umezawa (to Tosu Futures)
—	DF	JPN	Kiyotaka Hirai
—	MF	BUL	Kiril Metkov
—	MF	BRA	Flavio
—	MF	JPN	Yūji Yaso
—	MF	JPN	Kazuhiro Hashimura

== Transfers during the season ==
=== Out ===
- (Japan) Masahiro Wada (to Vissel Kobe)
- (Japan) Akira Kubota (to Kyoto Purple Sanga)

== Awards ==
none

== Other pages ==
- (in Japanese) J. League official site
- (in Japanese) Gamba Osaka official site
