= Keiju =

- Gender: Male

Origin
- Origin: Japanese
- Meaning: Different meanings depending on the kanji used

Keiju (written: 啓珠 or 桂樹) is a masculine Japanese given name. Notable people with the name include:

- Keiju Karashima (辛島 啓珠) (born 1971), Japanese footballer
- Keiju Kobayashi (小林 桂樹) (1923–2010), Japanese actor
- Keiju Okamoto (岡本 桂樹) (born 2006), Japanese singer
