= Karashima =

Karashima (written: 辛島) is a Japanese surname. Notable people with the surname include:

- Keiju Karashima (辛島 啓珠) (born 1971), Japanese footballer and manager
- Noboru Karashima (辛島 昇) (born 1933), Japanese historian, writer, and academic
