= Koji Kondo (footballer) =

Japanese association football player (1972–2003)

Koji Kondo 今藤 幸治
Personal information
- Date of birth: April 28, 1972
- Place of birth: Kariya, Aichi, Japan
- Date of death: April 17, 2003 (aged 30)
- Place of death: Toyoake, Aichi, Japan
- Height: 1.76 m (5 ft 9 1/2 in)
- Positions: Midfielder; defender

Youth career
- 1988–1990: Shizuoka Gakuen High School

Senior career*
Years	Team	Apps	(Gls)
1991–1998	Gamba Osaka	133	(4)
Total		133	(4)

International career
1994	Japan	2	(0)
- * Club domestic league appearances and goals

Koji Kondo (Japanese: 今藤 幸治, Hepburn: Kondō Kōji; April 28, 1972 – April 17, 2003) was a Japanese football player. He played for Japan national team.

== Club career ==
Kondo was born in Kariya on April 28, 1972. After graduating from Shizuoka Gakuen High School, he joined Matsushita Electric (later Gamba Osaka) in 1991. From 1992, he played as regular player at many positions, midfielder and side-back. However at 1996 Emperor's Cup on December 29, he hit his head against an opponent. An examination afterwards found a brain tumor. This match became his last match, and he left the club in June 1998. He played 133 games and scored 4 goals in the league.

== National team career ==
On May 22, 1994, Kondo debuted for Japan national team against Australia. He played as right side-back. On May 29, he also played against France.

== Death ==
On April 17, 2003, Kondo died of a brain tumor in Toyoake, Aichi, at the age of 30.

== Club statistics ==
Club performance			League		Cup		League Cup		Total	
Season	Club	League	Apps	Goals	Apps	Goals	Apps	Goals	Apps	Goals
Japan			League		Emperor's Cup		J.League Cup		Total	
1991/92	Matsushita Electric	JSL Division 1	0	0			0	0	0	0
1992	Gamba Osaka	J1 League	-				9	0	9	0
1993	Gamba Osaka	J1 League	28	0	2	0	2	0	32	0
1994	Gamba Osaka	J1 League	38	0	3	0	3	0	44	0
1995	Gamba Osaka	J1 League	43	4	4	1	-		47	5
1996	Gamba Osaka	J1 League	24	0	3	0	9	0	36	0
1997	Gamba Osaka	J1 League	0	0	0	0	0	0	0	0
1998	Gamba Osaka	J1 League	0	0	0	0	0	0	0	0
Total			133	4	12	1	23	0	167	5

== National team statistics ==
Japan national team
Year	Apps	Goals
1994	2	0
Total	2	0
