= Hayato Okanaka =

Japanese footballer

Hayato Okanaka 岡中 勇人
Personal information
- Full name: Hayato Okanaka
- Date of birth: September 26, 1968 (age 58)
- Place of birth: Hyogo, Japan
- Height: 1.86 m (6 ft 1 in)
- Position: Goalkeeper

Youth career
- 1984–1986: Tokai University Daigo High School
- 1987–1990: Tokai University

Senior career*
Years	Team	Apps	(Gls)
1991–2001	Gamba Osaka	156	(0)
2002–2005	Oita Trinita	84	(0)
Total		240	(0)
- * Club domestic league appearances and goals

Hayato Okanaka (岡中 勇人, Okanaka Hayato; born September 26, 1968) is a former Japanese football player.

== Playing career ==
Okanaka was born in Hyogo Prefecture on September 26, 1968. After graduating from Tokai University, he joined Matsushita Electric (later Gamba Osaka) in 1991. He battles with Kenji Honnami for regular goalkeeper for a long time. Although he could not play many matches in early 1990, he became a regular goalkeeper in late 1996. However he lost his position behind Ryota Tsuzuki in 2000. In 2002, he moved to J2 League club Oita Trinita. He played as regular goalkeeper and the club won the champions in 2000 and was promoted to J1 League. Although he played as regular goalkeeper in 2003, his opportunity to play decreased behind Riki Takasaki and Shusaku Nishikawa from 2004. He retired end of 2005 season.

== Club statistics ==
Club performance			League		Cup		League Cup		Total	
Season	Club	League	Apps	Goals	Apps	Goals	Apps	Goals	Apps	Goals
Japan			League		Emperor's Cup		League Cup		Total	
1990/91	Matsushita Electric	JSL Division 1	3	0	0	0	0	0	3	0
1991/92	Matsushita Electric	JSL Division 1	10	0			0	0	10	0
1992	Gamba Osaka	J1 League	-		0	0	0	0	0	0
1993	Gamba Osaka	J1 League	20	0	1	0	7	0	28	0
1994	Gamba Osaka	J1 League	0	0	0	0	0	0	0	0
1995	Gamba Osaka	J1 League	5	0	0	0	-		5	0
1996	Gamba Osaka	J1 League	16	0	0	0	8	0	24	0
1997	Gamba Osaka	J1 League	32	0	3	0	4	0	39	0
1998	Gamba Osaka	J1 League	33	0	1	0	4	0	38	0
1999	Gamba Osaka	J1 League	29	0	2	0	4	0	35	0
2000	Gamba Osaka	J1 League	8	0	0	0	1	0	9	0
2001	Gamba Osaka	J1 League	0	0	0	0	3	0	3	0
2002	Oita Trinita	J2 League	42	0	3	0	-		45	0
2003	Oita Trinita	J1 League	28	0	0	0	2	0	30	0
2004	Oita Trinita	J1 League	11	0	0	0	1	0	12	0
2005	Oita Trinita	J1 League	3	0	0	0	1	0	4	0
Career total			240	0	13	0	35	0	288	0
