= 1994 Gamba Osaka season =

Gamba Osaka
1994 season
- Manager: Kunishige Kamamoto
- Stadium: Expo '70 Commemorative Stadium
- J.League: 10th
- Emperor's Cup: Semifinals
- J.League Cup: Semifinals
- Top goalscorer: League: Toshihiro Yamaguchi (16); All: Toshihiro Yamaguchi (16)
- Highest home attendance: 21,829 (vs Verdy Kawasaki, 4 June 1994); 37,292 (vs Urawa Red Diamonds, 14 May 1994, Kobe Universiade Memorial Stadium)
- Lowest home attendance: 17,330 (vs Nagoya Grampus Eight, 19 October 1994); 12,568 (vs Júbilo Iwata, 4 May 1994, Kyoto Nishikyogoku Stadium)
- Average home league attendance: 22,367
Home colours	Away colours

1994 Gamba Osaka season

== Review and events ==
=== League results summary ===
Overall								Home						Away					
Pld	W	D	L	GF	GA	GD	Pts	W	D	L	GF	GA	GD	W	D	L	GF	GA	GD
44	15	0	29	66	82	−16	45	8	0	14	34	38	−4	7	0	15	32	44	−12

Source: J.LEAGUE OFFICIAL 1995 RECORD & DATA. ISBN 4-09-102317-7.

=== League results by round ===
J.League Suntory series (first stage)
Round	1	2	3	4	5	6	7	8	9	10	11	12	13	14	15	16	17	18	19	20	21	22
Ground	A	H	A	A	H	A	H	A	A	H	H	A	H	H	A	H	A	H	H	A	A	H
Result	L	L	W	W	L	L	W	L	L	L	L	L	W	W	L	L	W	L	L	L	L	W
Position	11	12	9	8	9	9	7	9	10	10	10	11	9	7	9	10	8	9	10	11	11	10

Source: J.LEAGUE OFFICIAL 1995 RECORD & DATA. ISBN 4-09-102317-7.
A = Away; H = Home; W = Win; D = Draw; L = Loss

J.League NICOS series (second stage)
Round	1	2	3	4	5	6	7	8	9	10	11	12	13	14	15	16	17	18	19	20	21	22
Ground	A	H	A	A	H	A	H	H	A	H	H	A	H	H	A	H	A	A	H	A	A	H
Result	L	L	W	L	L	L	L	L	L	L	W	L	W	W	W	W	L	W	L	W	L	L
Position	9	11	7	10	12	12	12	12	12	12	12	12	12	12	11	9	10	9	10	9	9	10

Source: J.LEAGUE OFFICIAL 1995 RECORD & DATA. ISBN 4-09-102317-7.
A = Away; H = Home; W = Win; D = Draw; L = Loss

== Competitions ==
Competitions	Position
J.League	10th / 12 clubs
Emperor's Cup	Semifinals
J.League Cup	Semifinals

== Domestic results ==
=== J.League ===
==== Suntory series ====
12 March 1994 1st-1	JEF United Ichihara	5–1	Gamba Osaka	Ichihara Stadium
15:00 JST (UTC+09)	Jō 24'; Otze 32', 77'; Igarashi 75'; Echigo 80'	J. League	Yamaguchi 88'	Attendance: 10,044; Referee: Bengt Borjesson; Assistant referees: Hiroshi Fukuda, Naotsugu Fuse; Fourth official: Takashi Ishiwatari

16 March 1994 1st-2	Gamba Osaka	1–2 (V-goal) (a.e.t.)	Sanfrecce Hiroshima	Expo '70 Commemorative Stadium
19:00 JST (UTC+09)	Yamaguchi 44'	J. League	Shima 71'; Hašek 118'	Attendance: 18,737; Referee: Kenji Tanaka; Assistant referees: Kazunori Ōtoshi, Yasuhiro Hemmi; Fourth official: Tsuyoshi Miyake

19 March 1994 1st-3	Nagoya Grampus Eight	0–2	Gamba Osaka	Nagoya Mizuho Football Stadium
15:02 JST (UTC+09)		J. League	Protassov 45'; Mita 62'	Attendance: 11,519; Referee: Bengt Borjesson; Assistant referees: Yoshitsugu Katayama, Yasuhiro Matsuzaki; Fourth official: Takao Wakahara; Man of the Match: Protassov

23 March 1994 1st-4	Júbilo Iwata	0–2	Gamba Osaka	Kusanagi Athletic Stadium
18:59 JST (UTC+09)		J. League	Shimada 1'; Isogai 75'	Attendance: 12,177; Referee: Shinichirō Obata; Assistant referees: Kazuo Kakihana, Yasushi Tsuchimoto; Fourth official: Takuya Okada

26 March 1994 1st-5	Gamba Osaka	1–3	Yokohama Flügels	Expo '70 Commemorative Stadium
16:04 JST (UTC+09)	Mita 33'	J. League	Maezono 37'; Amarilla 74', 87'	Attendance: 20,854; Referee: Zoran Petrović; Assistant referees: Fumikazu Shioyazono, Yoshitsugu Katayama; Fourth official: Tsuyoshi Miyake

2 April 1994 1st-6	Urawa Red Diamonds	2–1	Gamba Osaka	Urawa Komaba Stadium
15:01 JST (UTC+09)	Okano 20'; Fukuda 40'	J. League	Protassov 59'	Attendance: 9,157; Referee: Tatsumi Ōno; Assistant referees: Takeshi Ōkura, Kazuaki Hamaguchi; Fourth official: Keiji Kamiara

6 April 1994 1st-7	Gamba Osaka	3–2 (V-goal) (a.e.t.)	Bellmare Hiratsuka	Expo '70 Commemorative Stadium
19:03 JST (UTC+09)	Yamaguchi 57', 89' 104'	J. League	Betinho 64' (pen.); Almir 85'	Attendance: 19,798; Referee: Hideo Kikuchi; Assistant referees: Sōichirō Kaneko, Yoshikazu Hiroshima; Fourth official: Tsuyoshi Miyake; Man of the Match: Toshihiro Yamaguchi

9 April 1994 1st-8	Kashima Antlers	3–2 (V-goal) (a.e.t.)	Gamba Osaka	Kashima Soccer Stadium
15:01 JST (UTC+09)	Hasegawa 49' 96'; Hashimoto 81'	J. League	Morioka 16'; Isogai 54'	Attendance: 13,734; Referee: Bengt Borjesson; Assistant referees: Masahiro Katagiri, Masato Nogami; Fourth official: Ichirō Inukai

13 April 1994 1st-9	Verdy Kawasaki	2–0	Gamba Osaka	Kobe Universiade Memorial Stadium
19:03 JST (UTC+09)	Miura 67' (pen.); Takeda 83'	J. League		Attendance: 42,161; Referee: Zoran Petrović; Assistant referees: Kōetsu Kikuchi, Hiroyuki Umemoto; Fourth official: Kazunori Ōtoshi

16 April 1994 1st-10	Gamba Osaka	2–3	Yokohama Marinos	Expo '70 Commemorative Stadium
15:02 JST (UTC+09)	Morioka 8'; Isogai 49' (pen.)	J. League	Díaz 12', 63'; Medina Bello 20'	Attendance: 21,307; Referee: Bengt Borjesson; Assistant referees: Fumikazu Shioyazono, Yoshitsugu Katayama; Fourth official: Akira Okada

23 April 1994 1st-11	Gamba Osaka	0–2	Shimizu S-Pulse	Expo '70 Commemorative Stadium
15:02 JST (UTC+09)		J. League	Toninho 17'; Ōenoki 80'	Attendance: 19,303; Referee: Shinichirō Obata; Assistant referees: Sōichirō Kaneko, Toyohide Kanda; Fourth official: Tsuyoshi Miyake

27 April 1994 1st-12	Sanfrecce Hiroshima	3–3 (V-goal) (a.e.t.) (5–4 p)	Gamba Osaka	Hakatanomori Athletic Stadium
: JST (UTC+09)	Yanagimoto 9'; Hašek 14', 33'	J. League	Protassov 62', 71'; Karashima 86'	Attendance: 15,129; Referee: Kōetsu Kikuchi; Assistant referees: Hideaki Harada, Tōru Yamashiro; Fourth official: Masatoshi Shibata
	Penalties
	(penalty missed) Kazama; (penalty scored) Katanosaka; (penalty scored) Moriyasu; (penalty scored) Černý; (penalty scored) Hašek; (penalty scored) Takagi		(penalty missed) Isogai; (penalty scored) Flavio; (penalty scored) Protassov; (penalty scored) Aleinikov; (penalty scored) Karashima; (penalty missed) Matsunami

30 April 1994 1st-13	Gamba Osaka	3–0	Nagoya Grampus Eight	Kobe Universiade Memorial Stadium
15:03 JST (UTC+09)	Protassov 36', 38'; Isogai 59'	J. League		Attendance: 36,280; Referee: Kenji Tanaka; Assistant referees: Yoshikazu Hiroshima, Sōichirō Kaneko; Fourth official: Kazuya Yanagisawa; Man of the Match: Kenji Honnami

4 May 1994 1st-14	Gamba Osaka	3–0	Júbilo Iwata	Kyoto Nishikyogoku Stadium
19:03 JST (UTC+09)	Aleinikov 33'; Yamaguchi 55'; Matsunami 80'	J. League		Attendance: 12,568; Referee: Tatsumi Ōno; Assistant referees: Kazuya Yanagisawa, Kazunori Ōtoshi; Fourth official: Mitsuyoshi Nakaguma; Man of the Match: Aleinikov

7 May 1994 1st-15	Yokohama Flügels	3–2	Gamba Osaka	Yokohama Mitsuzawa Football Stadium
15:01 JST (UTC+09)	Amarilla 14', 86'; Válber 80'	J. League	Flavio 60' (pen.); Aleinikov 63'	Attendance: 13,904; Referee: Kōetsu Kikuchi; Assistant referees: Kazuaki Hamaguchi, Yū Nakamura; Fourth official: Michio Nakahara

14 May 1994 1st-16	Gamba Osaka	1–2	Urawa Red Diamonds	Kobe Universiade Memorial Stadium
19:01 JST (UTC+09)	Karashima 55'	J. League	Rummenigge 65' (pen.); Mizuuchi 84'	Attendance: 37,292; Referee: Kiichirō Tachi; Assistant referees: Morihisa Yamaguchi, Sōichirō Kaneko; Fourth official: Keiji Hayashi

18 May 1994 1st-17	Bellmare Hiratsuka	1–2 (V-goal) (a.e.t.)	Gamba Osaka	Hiratsuka Stadium
19:03 JST (UTC+09)	39' (o.g.)	J. League	Matsunami 89'; Nakamura 107'	Attendance: 14,321; Referee: Fumikazu Shioyazono; Assistant referees: Takashi Kunori, Kimio Izaki; Fourth official: Toshiya Kumagai; Man of the Match: Hirohito Nakamura

1 June 1994 1st-18	Gamba Osaka	1–3	Kashima Antlers	Expo '70 Commemorative Stadium
: JST (UTC+09)	Aleinikov 20'	J. League	Santos 12'; Zico 53'; Yoshida 61'	Attendance: 21,624; Referee: Yōtarō Moritsu; Assistant referees: Kazuo Kakihana, Sōichirō Kaneko; Fourth official: Tsuyoshi Miyake

4 June 1994 1st-19	Gamba Osaka	1–3	Verdy Kawasaki	Expo '70 Commemorative Stadium
19:05 JST (UTC+09)	Yamaguchi 24'	J. League	Miura 11', 22'; Kitazawa 87'	Attendance: 21,829; Referee: Hiroyuki Umemoto; Assistant referees: Yoshikazu Hiroshima, Yasuhiro Hemmi; Fourth official: Tsuyoshi Miyake

8 June 1994 1st-20	Yokohama Marinos	3–2	Gamba Osaka	Tochigi Utsunomiya Green Stadium
19:00 JST (UTC+09)	Bisconti 44' (pen.); T. Suzuki 64'; Jinno 75'	J. League	Protassov 15', 17'	Attendance: 17,022; Referee: Masahiro Sogawa; Assistant referees: Kazuaki Hamaguchi, Satoru Ishizawa; Fourth official: Hiroshi Okusawa

11 June 1994 1st-21	Shimizu S-Pulse	4–1	Gamba Osaka	Nihondaira Sports Stadium
15:04 JST (UTC+09)	Toninho 13', 71' (pen.), 89'; Miura 57'	J. League	Kiyama 88'	Attendance: 10,351; Referee: Yōtarō Moritsu; Assistant referees: Kazuaki Hamaguchi, Takeshi Ōkura; Fourth official: Masakazu Hōjō

15 June 1994 1st-22	Gamba Osaka	3–0	JEF United Ichihara	Expo '70 Commemorative Stadium
19:00 JST (UTC+09)	Shimada 48'; Protassov 65'; Aleinikov 74'	J. League		Attendance: 21,440; Referee: Kōetsu Kikuchi; Assistant referees: Morihisa Yamaguchi, Yasuhiro Hemmi; Fourth official: Sōichirō Kaneko; Man of the Match: Takahiro Shimada

==== NICOS series ====
10 August 1994 2nd-1	JEF United Ichihara	5–2	Gamba Osaka	Ichihara Stadium
19:02 JST (UTC+09)	Ordenewitz 20', 35', 67'; Jō 57'; Maslovar 70'	J. League	Yamaguchi 5', 71'	Attendance: 10,563; Referee: Tatsumi Ōno; Assistant referees: Toshiyuki Mayuzumi, Masahiro Katagiri; Fourth official: Misao Kataoka

13 August 1994 2nd-2	Gamba Osaka	1–1 (V-goal) (a.e.t.) (3–4 p)	Sanfrecce Hiroshima	Expo '70 Commemorative Stadium
19:00 JST (UTC+09)	Morioka 44'	J. League	Noh 6'	Attendance: 19,209; Referee: Yoshimi Ogawa; Assistant referees: Sōichirō Kaneko, Toyohide Kanda; Fourth official: Akio Okutani
	Penalties
	(penalty scored) Flavio; (penalty scored) Yamaguchi; (penalty missed) Protassov; (penalty scored) Mita; (penalty missed) Matsuyama; (penalty missed) Karashima		(penalty scored) Tore; (penalty missed) Kazama; (penalty missed) Matsuda; (penalty scored) Moriyasu; (penalty scored) Noh; (penalty scored) Moriyama

17 August 1994 2nd-3	Nagoya Grampus Eight	2–3 (V-goal) (a.e.t.)	Gamba Osaka	Tokyo National Stadium
19:00 JST (UTC+09)	Kosugi 83'; Hirano 89'	J. League	Yamaguchi 33'; Protassov 52'; Flavio 104'	Attendance: 50,375; Referee: Shizuo Takada; Assistant referees: Noboru Ishiyama, Hiroshi Fukuda; Fourth official: Takeyoshi Takahashi; Man of the Match: Protassov

20 August 1994 2nd-4	Júbilo Iwata	2–2 (V-goal) (a.e.t.) (5–4 p)	Gamba Osaka	Júbilo Iwata Stadium
18:59 JST (UTC+09)	Matsubara 72', 83'	J. League	Aleinikov 73'; Matsunami 89'	Attendance: 14,441; Referee: Hiroyuki Umemoto; Assistant referees: Kazuo Kakihana, Yasuhiro Hemmi; Fourth official: Takuya Okada
	Penalties
	(penalty scored) Ōishi; (penalty scored) M. Yoshida; (penalty scored) Date; (penalty scored) Koga; (penalty scored) Hattori		(penalty scored) Flavio; (penalty scored) Protassov; (penalty scored) Yamaguchi; (penalty scored) Kitamura; (penalty missed) Morioka

27 August 1994 2nd-5	Gamba Osaka	1–3	Yokohama Flügels	Kobe Universiade Memorial Stadium
19:01 JST (UTC+09)	Flavio 39'	J. League	Edu 65' (pen.); Maeda 70'; Maezono 72'	Attendance: 36,270; Referee: Yoshimi Ogawa; Assistant referees: Kazuya Yanagisawa, Kazunori Ōtoshi; Fourth official: Keiji Hayashi

31 August 1994 2nd-6	Urawa Red Diamonds	1–0	Gamba Osaka	Omiya Football Stadium
19:00 JST (UTC+09)	Lulu 5'	J. League		Attendance: 9,611; Referee: Hiroyuki Umemoto; Assistant referees: Kazuaki Hamaguchi, Toshiyuki Mayuzumi; Fourth official: Satoru Tanigawa

3 September 1994 2nd-7	Gamba Osaka	0–3	Bellmare Hiratsuka	Expo '70 Commemorative Stadium
19:03 JST (UTC+09)		J. League	T. Iwamoto 48', 65'; Nishiyama 86'	Attendance: 19,505; Referee: Yōtarō Moritsu; Assistant referees: Hiroshi Tanabe, Kazunori Ōtoshi; Fourth official: Tsuyoshi Miyake

7 September 1994 2nd-8	Gamba Osaka	0–1	Kashima Antlers	Expo '70 Commemorative Stadium
19:04 JST (UTC+09)		J. League	Leonardo 14'	Attendance: 18,887; Referee: Zoran Petrović; Assistant referees: Yoshikazu Hiroshima, Yasuhiro Matsuzaki; Fourth official: Tsuyoshi Miyake

10 September 1994 2nd-9	Verdy Kawasaki	2–1	Gamba Osaka	Kawasaki Todoroki Stadium
15:02 JST (UTC+09)	Takeda 60', 77'	J. League	Flavio 79' (pen.)	Attendance: 10,641; Referee: Kiyoshi Ōta; Assistant referees: Mitsuru Satō, Takashi Kunori; Fourth official: Yoshiharu Nakamura

14 September 1994 2nd-10	Gamba Osaka	0–0 (V-goal) (a.e.t.) (3–4 p)	Yokohama Marinos	Expo '70 Commemorative Stadium
19:01 JST (UTC+09)		J. League		Attendance: 19,060; Referee: Alberto Tejada; Assistant referees: Morihisa Yamaguchi, Tetsuya Hamana; Fourth official: Akio Okutani
	Penalties
	(penalty scored) Flavio; (penalty scored) Kitamura; (penalty missed) Yamaguchi; (penalty scored) Tsveiba; (penalty missed) Protassov		(penalty scored) Díaz; (penalty missed) Miura; (penalty scored) Ihara; (penalty scored) Koizumi; (penalty scored) Mizunuma

17 September 1994 2nd-11	Gamba Osaka	1–0	Shimizu S-Pulse	Expo '70 Commemorative Stadium
19:01 JST (UTC+09)	Isogai 38'	J. League		Attendance: 19,429; Referee: Kenji Tanaka; Assistant referees: Yoshikazu Hiroshima, Hideaki Harada; Fourth official: Akio Okutani; Man of the Match: Hiromitsu Isogai

21 September 1994 2nd-12	Sanfrecce Hiroshima	1–1 (V-goal) (a.e.t.) (4–3 p)	Gamba Osaka	Fukuyama Stadium
19:03 JST (UTC+09)	Hašek 2'	J. League	Yamamura 43'	Attendance: 8,898; Referee: Zoran Petrović; Assistant referees: Hiroshi Tanabe, Naoki Esumi; Fourth official: Hisae Nakamura
	Penalties
	(penalty scored) Kazama; (penalty scored) Tore; (penalty missed) Katanosaka; (penalty scored) Moriyama; (penalty scored) Černý		(penalty scored) Flavio; (penalty missed) Kitamura; (penalty missed) Tsveiba; (penalty scored) Isogai; (penalty scored) Kiyama

19 October 1994 2nd-13	Gamba Osaka	5–3	Nagoya Grampus Eight	Expo '70 Commemorative Stadium
19:03 JST (UTC+09)	Karashima 59'; Aleinikov 67'; Yamaguchi 77', 79'; Protassov 85'	J. League	Garça 11'; Jorginho 51'; Ogura 61'	Attendance: 17,330; Referee: Shinichirō Obata; Assistant referees: Kazuya Yanagisawa, Kazunori Ōtoshi; Fourth official: Akira Okada; Man of the Match: Toshihiro Yamaguchi

22 October 1994 2nd-14	Gamba Osaka	1–1 (V-goal) (a.e.t.) (5–4 p)	Júbilo Iwata	Kobe Universiade Memorial Stadium
19:05 JST (UTC+09)	Yamaguchi 60'	J. League	Yonezawa 35'	Attendance: 34,849; Referee: Kenji Tanaka; Assistant referees: Hiroshi Tanabe, Yasuhiro Matsuzaki; Fourth official: Keiji Hayashi; Man of the Match: Kenji Honnami
	Penalties
	(penalty scored) Isogai; (penalty scored) Yamaguchi; (penalty scored) Flavio; (penalty scored) Aleinikov; (penalty scored) Kitamura		(penalty scored) Vanenburg; (penalty scored) Ōishi; (penalty scored) M. Yoshida; (penalty missed) Schillaci; (penalty scored) Hattori

26 October 1994 2nd-15	Yokohama Flügels	0–2	Gamba Osaka	Kumamoto Suizenji Stadium
19:01 JST (UTC+09)		J. League	Yamaguchi 30', 82'	Attendance: 12,241; Referee: Fumikazu Shioyazono; Assistant referees: Hideaki Harada, Tōru Yamashiro; Fourth official: Mitsuo Kimura; Man of the Match: Kunio Kitamura

29 October 1994 2nd-16	Gamba Osaka	4–1	Urawa Red Diamonds	Expo '70 Commemorative Stadium
19:04 JST (UTC+09)	Kitamura 0'; Matsunami 70'; Flavio 75'; Tsveiba 89'	J. League	Buchwald 80'	Attendance: 18,318; Referee: Hideo Kikuchi; Assistant referees: Hiroshi Tanabe, Naoki Esumi; Fourth official: Akio Okutani; Man of the Match: Hiromitsu Isogai

2 November 1994 2nd-17	Bellmare Hiratsuka	3–0	Gamba Osaka	Hiratsuka Stadium
19:00 JST (UTC+09)	Noguchi 30'; Betinho 54', 86'	J. League		Attendance: 15,122; Referee: Shizuo Takada; Assistant referees: Satoru Kawano, Mitsuru Satō; Fourth official: Jōji Kashihara

5 November 1994 2nd-18	Kashima Antlers	1–2	Gamba Osaka	Kashima Soccer Stadium
15:01 JST (UTC+09)	Akita 89'	J. League	Morioka 16'; Isogai 87'	Attendance: 15,603; Referee: Rune Larsson; Assistant referees: Noboru Ishiyama, Takashi Kunori; Fourth official: Takao Onshi; Man of the Match: Shigeru Morioka

9 November 1994 2nd-19	Gamba Osaka	1–3	Verdy Kawasaki	Expo '70 Commemorative Stadium
19:06 JST (UTC+09)	Yamaguchi 39'	J. League	Bismarck 67' (pen.); Ishizuka 80'; Takeda 88'	Attendance: 19,778; Referee: Alberto Tejada; Assistant referees: Noboru Ishiyama, Yoshikazu Hiroshima; Fourth official: Akira Okada

12 November 1994 2nd-20	Yokohama Marinos	0–1 (V-goal) (a.e.t.)	Gamba Osaka	Yokohama Mitsuzawa Football Stadium
15:02 JST (UTC+09)		J. League	Matsuyama 113'	Attendance: 12,821; Referee: Masayoshi Okada; Assistant referees: Kazuaki Hamaguchi, Tetsu Karakida; Fourth official: Katsumi Ishii; Man of the Match: Kenji Honnami

16 November 1994 2nd-21	Shimizu S-Pulse	1–0	Gamba Osaka	Kusanagi Athletic Stadium
19:01 JST (UTC+09)	Iwashita 64'	J. League		Attendance: 17,090; Referee: Alberto Tejada; Assistant referees: Kazuo Kakihana, Kazuaki Hamaguchi; Fourth official: Masakazu Hōjō

9 November 1994 2nd-22	Gamba Osaka	1–2	JEF United Ichihara	Expo '70 Commemorative Stadium
15:05 JST (UTC+09)	Yamamura 89'	J. League	Ordenewitz 44'; M. Miyazawa 48'	Attendance: 18,417; Referee: Shinichirō Obata; Assistant referees: Kazunori Ōtoshi, Satoru Kawano; Fourth official: Akira Okada

=== Emperor's Cup ===
4 December 1994 1st Round	Gamba Osaka	3–1	Hannan University	Himeji Athletic Stadium
: JST (UTC+09)	Protassov ?', ?', ?'		Mochiyama ?'

11 December 1994 2nd Round	Gamba Osaka	5–0	Otsuka Pharmaceutical	Ehime Matsuyama Athletic Stadium
: JST (UTC+09)	Protassov ?'; Flavio ?', ?', ?'; Morioka ?'

18 December 1994 Quarterfinals	Kyoto Purple Sanga	0–2	Gamba Osaka	Hiroshima Big Arch
: JST (UTC+09)			Morioka ?'; Flavio ?'

23 December 1994 Semifinals	Bellmare Hiratsuka	3–2	Gamba Osaka	Tokyo National Stadium
: JST (UTC+09)	Noguchi 52'; Betinho 69'; Watanabe 82'		Matsuyama 78'; Kitamura 81'

=== J.League Cup ===
27 July 1994 1st Round	Gamba Osaka	2–1	Sanfrecce Hiroshima	Expo '70 Commemorative Stadium
19:00 JST (UTC+09)	Flavio 11', 70'	J. League	Černý 8'	Attendance: 19,235; Referee: Yōtarō Moritsu; Assistant referees: Yasuhiro Hemmi, Mitsuo Kadota; Fourth official: Kazuo Kakihana

30 July 1994 Quarterfinals	Gamba Osaka	3–0	Urawa Red Diamonds	Expo '70 Commemorative Stadium
19:00 JST (UTC+09)	Aleinikov 19'; Shimada 42'; Morioka 78'	J. League		Attendance: 20,556; Referee: Shinichirō Obata; Assistant referees: Morihisa Yamaguchi, Kazuo Kakihana; Fourth official: Akio Okutani

3 August 1994 Semifinals	Verdy Kawasaki	7–1	Gamba Osaka	Nagoya Mizuho Athletics Stadium
19:02 JST (UTC+09)	Bismarck 12', 31' (pen.), 35', 52'; Bentinho 16'; Kitazawa 71'; Takeda 89'	J. League	Flavio 75'	Attendance: 18,792; Referee: Masayoshi Okada; Assistant referees: Sōichirō Kaneko, Toshiyuki Mayuzumi; Fourth official: Yasushi Tsuchimoto

== Player statistics ==
No.	Pos	Nat	Player	Total		J-League		Emperor's Cup		J-League Cup	
No.	Pos	Nat	Player	Apps	Goals	Apps	Goals	Apps	Goals	Apps	Goals
	GK	(Japan) JPN	Kenji Honnami	50	0	43	0	4	0	3	0
	GK	(Japan) JPN	Atsushi Shirai	0	0	0	0	0	0	0	0
	GK	(Japan) JPN	Hayato Okanaka	0	0	0	0	0	0	0	0
	GK	(Japan) JPN	Tōru Kawashima	2	0	2	0	0	0	0	0
	GK	(Japan) JPN	Kiyoshi Fujii	0	0	0	0	0	0	0	0
	DF	(Japan) JPN	Takahiro Shimada	19	3	16	2	0	0	3	1
	DF	(Ukraine) UKR	Tsveiba	22	1	18	1	4	0	0	0
	DF	(Japan) JPN	Sōjirō Ishii	16	0	16	0	0	0	0	0
	DF	(Japan) JPN	Yūji Hashimoto	18	0	15	0	3	0	0	0
	DF	(Japan) JPN	Shōji Nonoshita	9	0	7	0	2	0	0	0
	DF	(Japan) JPN	Tetsuya Ogura	6	0	6	0	0	0	0	0
	DF	(Japan) JPN	Keiju Karashima	45	3	42	3	0	0	3	0
	DF	(Japan) JPN	Takashi Kiyama	34	1	27	1	4	0	3	0
	DF	(Japan) JPN	Takashi Umezawa	3	0	3	0	0	0	0	0
	DF	(Japan) JPN	Kaoru Asano	0	0	0	0	0	0	0	0
	DF	(Japan) JPN	Kazuya Matsuda	8	0	8	0	0	0	0	0
	DF	(Japan) JPN	Takehiro Katō	1	0	0	0	1	0	0	0
	DF	(Japan) JPN	Tomohiro Mori	0	0	0	0	0	0	0	0
	DF	(Japan) JPN	Masao Kiba	4	0	4	0	0	0	0	0
	DF	(Japan) JPN	Kiyotaka Hirai	0	0	0	0	0	0	0	0
	MF	(Belarus) BLR	Aleinikov	35	7	32	6	0	0	3	1
	MF	(Japan) JPN	Masahiro Wada	3	0	3	0	0	0	0	0
	MF	(Bulgaria) BUL	Metkov	0	0	0	0	0	0	0	0
	MF	(Brazil) BRA	Flavio	42	12	35	5	4	4	3	3
	MF	(Japan) JPN	Kunio Kitamura	18	2	15	1	3	1	0	0
	MF	(Japan) JPN	Hiromitsu Isogai	47	6	40	6	4	0	3	0
	MF	(Japan) JPN	Masayuki Mita	13	2	10	2	0	0	3	0
	MF	(Japan) JPN	Yūji Yaso	0	0	0	0	0	0	0	0
	MF	(Japan) JPN	Kazuhiro Hashimura	0	0	0	0	0	0	0	0
	MF	(Japan) JPN	Kōji Kondō	44	0	38	0	3	0	3	0
	MF	(Japan) JPN	Akira Kubota	6	0	6	0	0	0	0	0
	MF	(Japan) JPN	Taizō Komai	0	0	0	0	0	0	0	0
	FW	(Ukraine) UKR	Protassov	34	15	27	11	4	4	3	0
	FW	(Japan) JPN	Yoshiyuki Matsuyama	33	2	29	1	2	1	2	0
	FW	(Japan) JPN	Toshihiro Yamaguchi	46	16	39	16	4	0	3	0
	FW	(Japan) JPN	Naoki Hiraoka	13	0	11	0	1	0	1	0
	FW	(Japan) JPN	Shigeru Morioka	33	7	26	4	4	2	3	1
	FW	(Japan) JPN	Hirohito Nakamura	8	1	8	1	0	0	0	0
	FW	(Japan) JPN	Hiroto Yamamura	9	2	8	2	1	0	0	0
	FW	(Japan) JPN	Masanobu Matsunami	25	4	21	4	4	0	0	0
	FW	(Japan) JPN	Kensuke Nishijima	0	0	0	0	0	0	0	0

- † player(s) joined the team after the opening of this season.

== Transfers ==
In:

No.	Pos.	Nation	Player
—	GK	JPN	Atsushi Shirai (from Toshiba)
—	DF	UKR	Akhric Tsveiba (from FC KAMAZ)
—	DF	JPN	Keiju Karashima (from University of Tsukuba)
—	DF	JPN	Takashi Kiyama (from University of Tsukuba)
—	DF	JPN	Tomohiro Mori (from Renaiss Health & Medical College)
—	MF	JPN	Kazuhiro Hashimura (from Kibi International University)
—	FW	UKR	Oleg Protassov (from Olympiacos)
—	FW	JPN	Kensuke Nishijima (from Rakunan High School)

Out:

No.	Pos.	Nation	Player
—	DF	JPN	Tomoyuki Kajino (to Kashiwa Reysol)
—	DF	JPN	Susumu Uemura
—	DF	JPN	Naohiko Minobe (to Kyoto Purple Sanga)
—	DF	JPN	Tōru Morikawa
—	DF	JPN	Hiroki Azuma (to Yokohama Flügels)
—	DF	JPN	Yoshihisa Matsushima
—	MF	JPN	Katsuhiro Kusaki (to Kyoto Purple Sanga)
—	MF	JPN	Tomoo Kudaka (to Cerezo Osaka)
—	MF	PAR	Sachio Nakagoe
—	MF	JPN	Kazuaki Koezuka (to Kyoto Purple Sanga)
—	FW	JPN	Akihiro Nagashima (to Shimizu S-Pulse)
—	FW	JPN	Yoshiaki Satō (to Urawa Red Diamonds)

== Transfers during the season ==
=== In ===
none

== Awards ==
none

== Other pages ==
- (in Japanese) J. League official site
- (in Japanese) Gamba Osaka official site
