= Shigeru Morioka =

Japanese footballer

Shigeru Morioka 森岡 茂
Personal information
- Full name: Shigeru Morioka
- Date of birth: 12 April 1973 (age 53)
- Place of birth: Ozu, Ehime, Japan
- Height: 1.74 m (5 ft 8 1/2 in)
- Position: Midfielder

Youth career
- 1989–1991: Yawatahama Kogyo High School

Senior career*
Years	Team	Apps	(Gls)
1992–1998	Gamba Osaka	129	(15)
1999	Kyoto Purple Sanga	15	(2)
2000–2001	Vissel Kobe	18	(2)
2002–2005	Gamba Osaka	48	(3)
2006–2008	Banditonce Kakogawa	36	(9)
Total		246	(31)

International career
1996	Japan U-23	1	(0)

Managerial career
- 2008-2015: FC Osaka
Medal record
Gamba Osaka
Winner	J1 League	2005
Runner-up	J.League Cup	2005
- * Club domestic league appearances and goals

Shigeru Morioka (森岡 茂, Morioka Shigeru; born 12 August 1973) is a former Japanese football player.

== Club career ==
Morioka was born in Ozu on 12 August 1973. After graduating from high school, he joined Gamba Osaka in 1992. He debuted in 1993 and played many matches as offensive midfielder from 1994. His opportunity to play decreased in 1998. He moved to Kyoto Purple Sanga in 1999 and Vissel Kobe in 2000. He returned to Gamba in 2002. Although he played many matches in 2002, his opportunity to play decreased from 2003. In 2006, he moved to Regional Leagues club Banditonce Kobe (later Banditonce Kakogawa). He retired end of 2008 season.

== National team career ==
In July 1996, Morioka was selected Japan U-23 national team for 1996 Summer Olympics. At this tournament, he played 1 match as right side midfielder against Hungary in third match. Although Japan won 2 matches, Japan lost at First round. At this time, Japan won Brazil in first game. It was known as "Miracle of Miami" (マイアミの奇跡) in Japan.

== Career statistics ==
Appearances and goals by club, season and competition
Club	Season	League			Emperor's Cup		J.League Cup		Total	
Club	Season	Division	Apps	Goals	Apps	Goals	Apps	Goals	Apps	Goals
Gamba Osaka	1992	J1 League	-		0	0	0	0	0	0
Gamba Osaka	1993	J1 League	1	0	0	0	0	0	1	0
Gamba Osaka	1994	J1 League	26	4	4	2	3	1	33	7
Gamba Osaka	1995	J1 League	45	5	0	0	-		45	5
Gamba Osaka	1996	J1 League	16	1	0	0	9	1	25	2
Gamba Osaka	1997	J1 League	28	5	1	0	0	0	29	5
Gamba Osaka	1998	J1 League	13	0	1	0	0	0	14	0
Kyoto Purple Sanga	1999	J1 League	15	2	0	0	3	1	18	3
Vissel Kobe	2000	J1 League	13	2	0	0	2	0	15	2
Vissel Kobe	2001	J1 League	5	0	0	0	0	0	5	0
Gamba Osaka	2002	J1 League	21	1	2	0	8	0	31	1
Gamba Osaka	2003	J1 League	10	0	0	0	2	0	12	0
Gamba Osaka	2004	J1 League	14	2	2	0	5	1	21	3
Gamba Osaka	2005	J1 League	3	0	1	0	0	0	4	0
Banditonce Kobe	2006	Regional Leagues	12	2	4	0	-		16	2
Banditonce Kobe	2007	Regional Leagues	13	5	3	0	-		16	5
Banditonce Kakogawa	2008	Regional Leagues	11	2	-		-		11	2
Career total			246	31	18	2	32	4	296	37
