= Yoshiyuki Matsuyama =

Japanese footballer (born 1966)

Yoshiyuki Matsuyama 松山 吉之
Personal information
- Full name: Yoshiyuki Matsuyama
- Date of birth: July 31, 1966 (age 60)
- Place of birth: Kyoto, Kyoto, Japan
- Height: 1.77 m (5 ft 9 1/2 in)
- Position: Midfielder

Youth career
- 1982–1984: Yamashiro High School
- 1985–1988: Waseda University

Senior career*
Years	Team	Apps	(Gls)
1989–1991	Furukawa Electric	42	(6)
1991–1996	Gamba Osaka	120	(15)
1997	Kyoto Purple Sanga	19	(0)
Total		181	(21)

International career
1987–1989	Japan	10	(4)
Medal record
Furukawa Electric
Runner-up	JSL Cup	1990
- * Club domestic league appearances and goals

Yoshiyuki Matsuyama (松山 吉之, Matsuyama Yoshiyuki; born July 31, 1966) is a former Japanese football player. He played for Japan national team. His brother Hiroaki Matsuyama is also former footballer.

== Club career ==
Matsuyama was born in Kyoto on July 31, 1966. After graduating from Waseda University, he joined Furukawa Electric in 1989. He moved to Matsushita Electric (later Gamba Osaka) in 1991. In 1997, he moved to his local club Kyoto Purple Sanga. He retired end of 1997 season.

== National team career ==
In April 1987, when Matsuyama was a Waseda University student, he was selected Japan national team for 1988 Summer Olympics qualification. At this qualification, on April 8, he debuted against Indonesia. He played 10 games and scored 4 goals for Japan until 1989.

== Club statistics ==
Club performance			League		Cup		League Cup		Total	
Season	Club	League	Apps	Goals	Apps	Goals	Apps	Goals	Apps	Goals
Japan			League		Emperor's Cup		J.League Cup		Total	
1989/90	Furukawa Electric	JSL Division 1	21	2			2	2	23	4
1990/91	Furukawa Electric	JSL Division 1	21	4			0	0	21	4
1991/92	Matsushita Electric	JSL Division 1	19	5			0	0	19	5
1992	Gamba Osaka	J1 League	-				7	2	7	2
1993	Gamba Osaka	J1 League	22	3	2	1	0	0	24	4
1994	Gamba Osaka	J1 League	29	1	2	1	2	0	33	2
1995	Gamba Osaka	J1 League	26	4	4	0	-		30	4
1996	Gamba Osaka	J1 League	24	2	4	0	12	3	40	5
1997	Kyoto Purple Sanga	J1 League	19	0	2	0	5	2	26	2
Total			181	21	14	2	28	9	223	32

== National team statistics ==
Japan national team
Year	Apps	Goals
1987	9	4
1988	0	0
1989	1	0
Total	10	4
