= Yuji Hashimoto =

Japanese footballer and manager

Yuji Hashimoto 橋本 雄二
Personal information
- Full name: Yuji Hashimoto
- Date of birth: May 13, 1970 (age 56)
- Place of birth: Hitachi, Ibaraki, Japan
- Height: 1.85 m (6 ft 1 in)
- Position: Defender

Youth career
- 1986–1988: Hitachi Technical High School
- 1989–1992: Tokai University

Senior career*
Years	Team	Apps	(Gls)
1993–1996	Gamba Osaka	54	(0)
1997–1998	Sagan Tosu	48	(4)
Total		102	(4)

Managerial career
- 2003: Sagawa Printing
- 2004–2006: Banditonce Kobe
- 2007: Sagawa Printing
- 2009–2016: Banditonce Kakogawa
- 2017–2018: Lagend Shiga FC
- * Club domestic league appearances and goals

Yuji Hashimoto (橋本 雄二, Hashimoto Yuji; born May 13, 1970) is a Japanese former football player and manager.

== Playing career ==
Hashimoto was born in Hitachi on May 13, 1970. After graduating from Tokai University, he joined Gamba Osaka in 1993. He played many matches as center back in 1994 and 1995. However he could hardly play in the match in 1996 and he moved to Japan Football League club Sagan Tosu in 1997. He played as regular player in two seasons and he retired at the end of the 1998 season.

== Coaching career ==
After retirement, Hashimoto started his coaching career at Sagawa Express Osaka in 1999. In 2000, he moved to Regional Leagues club Sagawa Printing and became a coach. The club was promoted to Japan Football League from 2003, and he also became a manager in 2003. In 2004, he moved to Regional Leagues club Central Kobe (later Banditonce Kobe, Banditonce Kakogawa). He managed the club until 2006. In 2007, he moved to Sagawa Printing again and managed in one season. In 2008, he moved to Banditonce Kakogawa again and became a manager in 2009. He managed the club until 2016. In 2017, he moved to Regional Leagues club Lagend Shiga FC. He resigned in July 2018.

== Career statistics ==
Appearances and goals by club, season and competition
Club	Season	League			Emperor's Cup		J.League Cup		Total	
Club	Season	Division	Apps	Goals	Apps	Goals	Apps	Goals	Apps	Goals
Gamba Osaka	1993	J1 League	1	0	0	0	0	0	1	0
Gamba Osaka	1994	J1 League	15	0	3	0	0	0	18	0
Gamba Osaka	1995	J1 League	37	0	2	0	—		39	0
Gamba Osaka	1996	J1 League	1	0	0	0	4	0	5	0
Sagan Tosu	1997	Football League	24	3	3	0	5	0	32	3
Sagan Tosu	1998	Football League	24	1	0	0	—		24	1
Career total			102	4	8	0	11	0	121	4
