= 1992 Gamba Osaka season =

Gamba Osaka
1992 season
- Manager: Kunishige Kamamoto
- Stadium: Expo '70 Commemorative Stadium (under repair)
- Emperor's Cup: Quarterfinals
- J.League Cup: GL 8th
- Top goalscorer: League: All: Akihiro Nagashima (7)

1992 Gamba Osaka season

== Team name ==
Club name
Panasonic Gamba Osaka
Nickname
Gamba Osaka

== Competitions ==
Competitions	Position
Emperor's Cup	Quarterfinals
J.League Cup	GL 8th / 10 clubs

== Domestic results ==
=== Emperor's Cup ===
5 December 1992 1st Round	Mitsubishi Motors Mizushima	0–5	Gamba Osaka	Hofu Stadium
: JST (UTC+09:00)			Matsuyama ?', ?'; Kusaki ?'; Minobe ?'; Nagashima ?'

6 December 1992 2nd Round	Sanfrecce Hiroshima	2–3 (a.e.t.)	Gamba Osaka	Hofu Stadium
: JST (UTC+09:00)	Černý ?'; Daniel ?'		Müller ?', ?'; Uemura ?'

20 December 1992 Quarterfinals	Verdy Kawasaki	1–1 (a.e.t.) (4–2 p)	Gamba Osaka	Expo '70 Commemorative Stadium
: JST (UTC+09:00)	Pereira ?'		Nagashima ?'

=== J.League Cup ===
5 September 1992 GL-1	Gamba Osaka	2–0	Yokohama Marinos	Kobe Central Football Stadium
19:00 JST (UTC+09:00)	Nagashima 69'; Matsuyama 84'	J. League		Attendance: 4,728; Referee: Yōtarō Moritsu; Assistant referees: Kazunori Okada; Yoshikazu Hiroshima; Fourth official: Toshiyuki Osame

9 September 1992 GL-2	Gamba Osaka	1–0	JEF United Ichihara	Kobe Central Football Stadium
19:00 JST (UTC+09:00)	Matsuyama 51'	J. League		Attendance: 2,760; Referee: Shinichirō Obata; Assistant referees: Hiroyuki Umemoto; Keiji Hayashi; Fourth official: Toshiyuki Osame

12 September 1992 GL-3	Yokohama Flügels	3–2	Gamba Osaka	Nagasaki Stadium
15:00 JST (UTC+09:00)	Ikenoue 30'; Maeda 32'; Tomishima 44'	J. League	Nagashima 22', 71'	Attendance: 5,262; Referee: Kōetsu Kikuchi; Assistant referees: Fumikazu Shioyazono; Hideaki Harada; Fourth official: Tsutomu Io

19 September 1992 GL-4	Verdy Kawasaki	5–2	Gamba Osaka	Kawasaki Todoroki Stadium
19:00 JST (UTC+09:00)	Miura 31', 53', 72'; Takeda 43'; H. Katō 64'	J. League	Müller 47', 62'	Attendance: 7,568; Referee: Hitoshi Yamada; Assistant referees: Takeshi Ōkura; Takashi Kunori; Fourth official: Tsuneo Katō

23 September 1992 GL-5	Shimizu S-Pulse	1–2	Gamba Osaka	Kusanagi Athletic Stadium
16:00 JST (UTC+09:00)	Ōenoki 84'	J. League	Nagashima 50'; Müller 68'	Attendance: 12,199; Referee: Tetsuya Hamana; Assistant referees: Yoshio Sawada; Yoshimi Ogawa; Fourth official: Teruhito Kudō

26 September 1992 GL-6	Gamba Osaka	0–3	Nagoya Grampus Eight	Kyoto Nishikyogoku Stadium
18:00 JST (UTC+09:00)		J. League	Shimamura 37'; T. Ogura 60', 89'	Attendance: 14,341; Referee: Shinichirō Obata; Assistant referees: Mitsuyoshi Nakaguma; Yasuhiro Hemmi; Fourth official: Morihisa Yamaguchi

4 October 1992 GL-7	Gamba Osaka	1–3	Sanfrecce Hiroshima	Okayama Stadium
18:30 JST (UTC+09:00)	Nagashima 37'	J. League	Daniel 14'; Tanaka 43'; Černý 64'	Attendance: 6,157; Referee: Hiroyuki Umemoto; Assistant referees: Mitsuo Kadota; Masanori Watanabe; Fourth official: Toshiharu Fujimura

7 October 1992 GL-8	Kashima Antlers	1–2	Gamba Osaka	Kyoto Nishikyogoku Stadium
19:00 JST (UTC+09:00)	Santos 31'	J. League	Kusaki 42'; Kajino 64'	Attendance: 12,381; Referee: Fumikazu Shioyazono; Assistant referees: Hiroyuki Umemoto; Yōzō Tanaka; Fourth official: Ryūichi Mogi

11 October 1992 GL-9	Gamba Osaka	1–2 (sudden-death) (a.e.t.)	Urawa Red Diamonds	Kobe Universiade Memorial Stadium
14:01 JST (UTC+09:00)	Minobe 44'	J. League	Hashiratani 36'; Fukuda 107'	Attendance: 15,871; Referee: Morihisa Yamaguchi; Assistant referees: Kenji Tanaka; Akira Okada; Fourth official: Tetsuo Ebara

== Player statistics ==
Pos.	Nat.	Player	D.o.B. (Age)	Height / Weight	Emperor's Cup		J.League Cup		Total	
Pos.	Nat.	Player	D.o.B. (Age)	Height / Weight	Apps	Goals	Apps	Goals	Apps	Goals
DF	(Japan)	Tomoyuki Kajino	July 11, 1960 (aged 32)	182 cm / 76 kg		0	3	1		1
MF	(Brazil)	Müller	February 14, 1961 (aged 31)	174 cm / 69 kg		2	8	3		5
MF	(Japan)	Katsuhiro Kusaki	April 12, 1962 (aged 30)	177 cm / 72 kg		1	6	1		2
MF	(Japan)	Tomoo Kudaka	March 14, 1963 (aged 29)	168 cm / 64 kg		0	5	0		0
FW	(Japan)	Katsushi Kajii	July 11, 1963 (aged 29)	178 cm / 72 kg		0	1	0		0
GK	(Japan)	Yūji Keigoshi	September 17, 1963 (aged 28)	183 cm / 76 kg		0	7	0		0
DF	(China)	Jia Xiuquan	November 9, 1963 (aged 28)	182 cm / 80 kg		0	7	0		0
FW	(Japan)	Akihiro Nagashima	April 9, 1964 (aged 28)	181 cm / 76 kg		2	9	5		7
DF	(Japan)	Susumu Uemura	April 9, 1964 (aged 28)	185 cm / 75 kg		1	0	0		1
GK	(Japan)	Kenji Honnami	June 23, 1964 (aged 28)	186 cm / 85 kg		0	2	0		0
MF	(Japan)	Masahiro Wada	January 21, 1965 (aged 27)	178 cm / 68 kg		0	9	0		0
DF	(Japan)	Takahiro Shimada	February 9, 1965 (aged 27)	182 cm / 74 kg		0	0	0		0
DF	(Japan)	Naohiko Minobe	July 12, 1965 (aged 27)	176 cm / 68 kg		1	2	1		2
MF	(Paraguay)	Sachio Nakagoe	October 20, 1965 (aged 26)	169 cm / 72 kg		0	0	0		0
FW	(Japan)	Naoki Hirano	November 2, 1965 (aged 26)	174 cm / 71 kg		0	0	0		0
DF	(Japan)	Tōru Morikawa	June 29, 1966 (aged 26)	172 cm / 66 kg		0	8	0		0
DF	(Japan)	Hiroki Azuma	July 10, 1966 (aged 26)	179 cm / 74 kg		0	9	0		0
MF	(Japan)	Yoshiyuki Matsuyama	July 31, 1966 (aged 26)	177 cm / 72 kg		2	7	2		4
MF	(Brazil)	Lange	December 18, 1966 (aged 25)	168 cm / 67 kg		0	9	0		0
MF	(Japan)	Kazuaki Koezuka	February 10, 1967 (aged 25)	174 cm / 67 kg		0	6	0		0
FW	(Japan)	Tatsuya Bōno	April 27, 1967 (aged 25)	175 cm / 69 kg		0	0	0		0
DF	(Japan)	Yoshihisa Matsushima	November 16, 1967 (aged 24)	181 cm / 73 kg		0	0	0		0
MF	(Japan)	Tetsuya Shiokawa	April 10, 1968 (aged 24)	170 cm / 63 kg		0	0	0		0
MF	(Japan)	Kunio Kitamura	August 14, 1968 (aged 24)	175 cm / 70 kg		0	0	0		0
GK	(Japan)	Hayato Okanaka	September 26, 1968 (aged 23)	185 cm / 82 kg		0	0	0		0
DF	(Japan)	Kōji Maeda	February 3, 1969 (aged 23)	178 cm / 78 kg		0	0	0		0
MF		Kim Sang-Kwan	March 25, 1969 (aged 23)	182 cm / 75 kg		0	0	0		0
MF	(Japan)	Hiromitsu Isogai	April 19, 1969 (aged 23)	177 cm / 74 kg		0	8	0		0
MF	(Japan)	Yoshihiro Fujita	June 12, 1969 (aged 23)	164 cm / 60 kg		0	0	0		0
FW	(Japan)	Yoshiaki Satō	June 19, 1969 (aged 23)	188 cm / 82 kg	0	0	0	0	0	0
MF	(Japan)	Keizō Masuhara	August 26, 1969 (aged 23)	172 cm / 66 kg		0	0	0		0
MF	(Japan)	Masayuki Mita	October 5, 1969 (aged 22)	180 cm / 81 kg		0	0	0		0
MF	(Japan)	Sōjirō Ishii	March 29, 1970 (aged 22)	176 cm / 72 kg		0	0	0		0
GK	(Japan)	Tōru Kawashima	June 4, 1970 (aged 22)	181 cm / 73 kg		0	0	0		0
MF	(Japan)	Kōji Kondō	April 28, 1972 (aged 20)	176 cm / 65 kg		0	9	0		0
MF	(Japan)	Takashi Hazama	July 23, 1972 (aged 20)	175 cm / 65 kg		0	0	0		0
MF	(Japan)	Takashi Umezawa	December 7, 1972 (aged 19)	176 cm / 70 kg		0	0	0		0
MF	(Japan)	Akira Kubota	April 12, 1973 (aged 19)	168 cm / 63 kg		0	0	0		0
DF	(Japan)	Kaoru Asano	May 19, 1973 (aged 19)	181 cm / 74 kg		0	0	0		0
DF	(Japan)	Naoki Hiraoka	May 24, 1973 (aged 19)	173 cm / 65 kg		0	0	0		0
MF	(Japan)	Taizō Komai	June 14, 1973 (aged 19)	177 cm / 67 kg		0	0	0		0
MF	(Japan)	Shigeru Morioka	August 12, 1973 (aged 19)	174 cm / 67 kg		0	0	0		0
FW	(Brazil)	Edivaldo †	April 13, 1962 (aged 30)	cm / – kg		0	0	0		0

- † player(s) joined the team after the opening of this season.

== Transfers ==
In:

No.	Pos.	Nation	Player
—	DF	JPN	Tomoyuki Kajino (from Yanmar diesel)
—	DF	CHN	Jia Xiuquan (from Bayi FC)
—	MF	JPN	Katsuhiro Kusaki (from Yanmar diesel)
—	MF	JPN	Hiromitsu Isogai (from Tokai University)
—	FW	JPN	Yoshiyuki Matsuyama (from JR Furukawa)
—	FW	JPN	Yoshiaki Satō (from Doshisha University)
—	DF	JPN	Kaoru Asano (from Daisho Gakuen High School)
—	MF	PAR	Sachio Nakagoe
—	MF	JPN	Keizō Masuhara (from Kyoto Sangyo University)
—	MF	JPN	Masayuki Mita (from Osaka University of Commerce)
—	MF	JPN	Akira Kubota (from Rakunan High School)
—	MF	JPN	Taizō Komai (from Tokai University Gyosei Senior High School)
—	MF	JPN	Shigeru Morioka (from Yawatahama Technical High School)
—	FW	JPN	Sōjirō Ishii (from Meiji University)
—	DF	JPN	Naoki Hiraoka (from Hatsushiba High School)

Out:

No.	Pos.	Nation	Player
0	DF	JPN	Shinobu Ikeda (retired)
4	DF	BRA	Dario
12	MF	JPN	Hirokazu Sasaki (to Verdy Kawasaki)
25	FW	JPN	Hiroki Yanagi

== Transfers during the season ==
=== In ===
- (Brazil) Edivaldo (on November)

=== Out ===
none

== Other pages ==
- (in Japanese) J. League official site
- (in Japanese) Gamba Osaka official site
