= Takashi Kiyama =

Japanese footballer and manager

Takashi Kiyama 木山 隆之
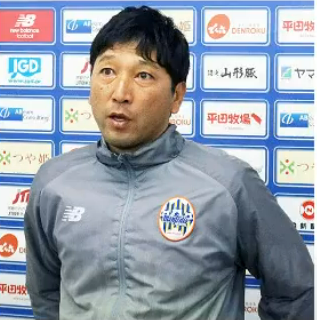

Personal information
- Full name: Takashi Kiyama
- Date of birth: February 18, 1972 (age 54)
- Place of birth: Itami, Hyogo, Japan
- Height: 1.80 m (5 ft 11 in)
- Position: Defender

Team information
- Current team: Fagiano Okayama (manager)

Youth career
- 1987–1989: Itami Nishi High School

College career
Years	Team	Apps	(Gls)
1990–1993	University of Tsukuba		

Senior career*
Years	Team	Apps	(Gls)
1994–1997	Gamba Osaka	50	(1)
1998	Consadole Sapporo	16	(0)
1999–2002	Mito Hollyhock	99	(1)
Total		165	(2)

Managerial career
- 2008–2010: Mito Hollyhock
- 2012: JEF United Chiba
- 2015–2016: Ehime FC
- 2017–2019: Montedio Yamagata
- 2020: Vegalta Sendai
- 2022–: Fagiano Okayama
- * Club domestic league appearances and goals

Takashi Kiyama (木山 隆之, Kiyama Takashi; born February 18, 1972) is a Japanese professional football manager and former player who is the manager of J1 League club Fagiano Okayama.

== Playing career ==
Kiyama was born in Itami on February 18, 1972. After graduating from University of Tsukuba, he joined Gamba Osaka in 1994. He played many matches as center back from first season. However his opportunity to play decreased from 1995 because of injuries. In 1998, he moved to Consadole Sapporo and played one season. In May 1999, he joined Japan Football League club Mito HollyHock. He became a regular player as center back and the club was promoted to J2 League from 2000. He played as central player of defense until 2002. He retired at the end of the 2002 season.

== Coaching career ==
After coaching for University of Tsukuba and then the youth team of Vissel Kobe, he took his first top team coaching position for his former club Mito HollyHock in 2008. He has the record for the youngest person to coach a J2 League club at 36 years and 19 days, and was the first J2 League coach to be sent off in his debut match. He is also the first professional sports coach in Japan to go public about his decision to quit smoking.

Kiyama was the manager for J2 side JEF United Chiba at 2012 season, but after JEF failed to get the promotion to J1, he was released from the team on November 28, 2012, but he continued managing the club until their defeat to Kashima Antlers on 2012 Emperor's Cup at the quarterfinals.

Kiyama returned to Vissel Kobe as assistant coach in 2013.

On 16 December 2014, he was named manager of Ehime FC. With him in charge, the team finished 2015 season on 5th place, reaching the play-offs for its first time ever. He left the club after the end of 2016 season.

On 29 November 2016, Kiyama was named manager of Montedio Yamagata. He led the team to the J1 entry playoff in 2019, losing to Tokushima Vortis in the 2nd round. He departed from the club on 11 December 2019.

On 19 December 2019, Kiyama was appointed the manager of Vegalta Sendai, the first J1 League side of this managerial career. On 18 December 2020, the club announced his departure at the end of the 2020 season.

On 28 September 2021, Kiyama returned to Gamba Osaka as a coach until the end of the season.

On 14 December 2021, he signed with Fagiano Okayama. Kiyama led the club to promotion into the J1 League for the first time in the club's history, after defeating Vegalta Sendai 2–0 in the 2024 play-off final.

== Career statistics ==
Appearances and goals by club, season and competition
Club	Season	League			Emperor's Cup		J.League Cup		Total	
Club	Season	Division	Apps	Goals	Apps	Goals	Apps	Goals	Apps	Goals
Gamba Osaka	1994	J1 League	27	1	4	0	3	0	34	1
Gamba Osaka	1995	J1 League	1	0	0	0	—		1	0
Gamba Osaka	1996	J1 League	12	0	2	0	0	0	14	0
Gamba Osaka	1997	J1 League	10	0	0	0	5	0	15	0
Consadole Sapporo	1998	J1 League	16	0	1	0	1	0	18	0
Mito HollyHock	1999	Football League	15	0	3	0	—		18	0
Mito HollyHock	2000	J2 League	26	0	3	0	0	0	29	0
Mito HollyHock	2001	J2 League	27	0	3	0	0	0	30	0
Mito HollyHock	2002	J2 League	31	1	3	0	—		34	1
Career total			165	2	19	0	9	0	193	2

== Managerial statistics ==
As of match played 7 December 2024

Managerial record by team and tenure
Team	Nat.	From	To	Record					Ref.
Team	Nat.	From	To	G	W	D	L	Win %	Ref.
Mito Hollyhock	(Japan)	1 February 2008	31 January 2011	134	44	32	58	32.84	
JEF United Chiba	(Japan)	1 February 2012	31 January 2013	48	24	10	14	50.00	
Ehime FC	(Japan)	1 February 2015	31 January 2017	90	36	28	26	40.00	
Montedio Yamagata	(Japan)	1 February 2017	31 January 2020	136	52	43	41	38.24	
Vegalta Sendai	(Japan)	1 February 2020	31 January 2021	36	6	10	20	16.67	
Fagiano Okayama	(Japan)	1 February 2022	Present	130	54	46	30	41.54	
Career Total				574	216	169	189	37.63	

== Honours ==
=== Manager ===
Fagiano Okayama

- J2 League Promotion play-off winner: 2024
