= Oleh Protasov =

Ukrainian footballer

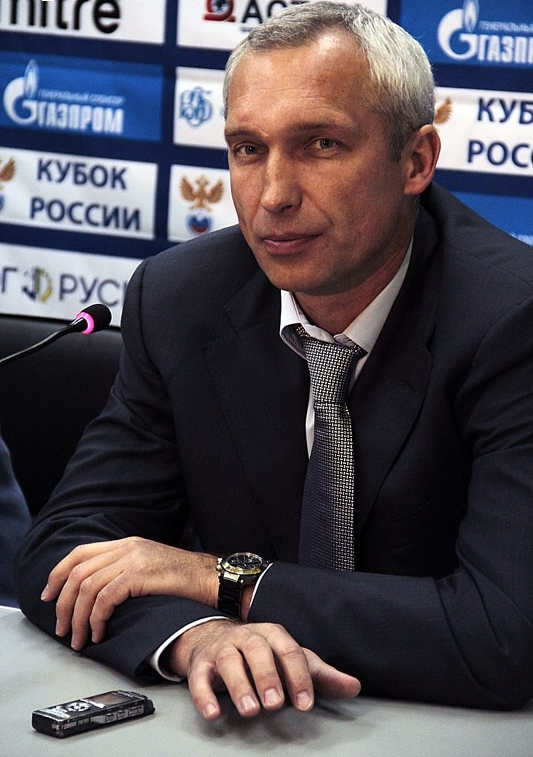
- Protasov in 2011

Personal information
- Full name: Oleh Valeriyovych Protasov
- Date of birth: 4 February 1964 (age 62)
- Place of birth: Dnipropetrovsk, Ukrainian SSR, Soviet Union
- Height: 1.86 m (6 ft 1 in)
- Position: Forward

Youth career
- 1972–1974: Meteor Dnipropetrovsk (SC Meteor)
- 1975–1981: Dnipro-75 (FC Dnipro)

Senior career*
Years	Team	Apps	(Gls)
1981–1987	Dnipro Dnipropetrovsk	145	(95)
1988–1990	Dynamo Kyiv	71	(30)
1990–1994	Olympiacos	83	(48)
1994–1995	Gamba Osaka	55	(24)
1996–1998	Veria	62	(11)
1998–1999	Proodeftiki	28	(5)
1999–2000	Panelefsiniakos	2	(1)
Total		446	(214)

International career
1984–1991	Soviet Union	68	(29)
1994	Ukraine	1	(0)

Managerial career
- 1999–2000: Veria
- 2002–2004: Olympiacos
- 2004–2005: AEL Limassol
- 2005: Steaua București
- 2006–2008: Dnipro Dnipropetrovsk
- 2008: Kuban Krasnodar
- 2009: Iraklis
- 2010–2011: Rostov
- 2012: Astana
- 2012–2013: Dinamo Minsk
- 2014–2015: Astra Giurgiu
- 2015: Aris
Medal record
Representing Soviet Union
UEFA European Championship
Runner-up	1988 West Germany
UEFA European U-19 Championships
Bronze medal – third place	1982 Finland
- * Club domestic league appearances and goals

Oleh Valeriyovych Protasov (Ukrainian: Олег Валерійович Протасов; born 4 February 1964) is a Ukrainian and Soviet former footballer who played as a striker. He was a key member of the Soviet Union national team throughout the 1980s; his 29 goals for the Soviet Union are second in the team's history, behind Oleg Blokhin's 42. Protasov also holds the record for the number of goals per season by scoring 35 goals. It should be considered that his first name is often spelled as Oleg on most international rosters, particularly during his playing career (Russification of Ukraine).

== Club career ==
Oleh Protasov started playing football at the age of 8 years old in his hometown of Dnipropetrovsk in Dnipro Dnipropetrovsk, where he played until 1987. His father, who was an engineer at Yuzhmash, brought him to the Meteor Stadium. Later, Protasov enrolled in the Dnipro-75 sports school led by Igor Vetrogonov. In 1983, he was on the champion's roster of Dnipro, which gained its first domestic title. While playing for Dnipro during the 1985 season, he became the top goalscorer of the season with 35, which became the record of goals scored in a single season. For this achievement, on 13 November 1986, he was awarded the European Silver Shoe during the annual award ceremony held at Le Lido. The award was handed to him by former French international footballer Roger Piantoni.

In 1987, Protasov moved to play for the Soviet-Ukrainian football giants, Dynamo Kyiv. His transfer to Dynamo, which took place along with Hennadiy Lytovchenko, was arranged as a compulsory military service. In all, in the Soviet Union, he won the Soviet Championship twice and was named Soviet Footballer of the Year in 1987. He scored 125 goals in the Soviet Championship, making him the eighth-best scorer of all time in the Championship.

Following the fall of the Soviet Union, Oleh Protasov got a chance to play abroad. In 1990, he joined Greek side Olympiacos Piraeus that was coached by Oleh Blokhin. Leaving Olympiacos in 1994, he played in Gamba Osaka, Veria FC, and finally Proodeftiki FC, from where he retired in 1999.

== International career ==
Protasov played for the Soviet Union 68 times, including at the 1986 and 1990 FIFA World Cups, as well as Euro 88, where he scored two goals. He also played one game for the Ukraine national team, in 1994.

In 1983, Protasov took part in the Summer Spartakiad of the Peoples of the USSR, representing the Ukrainian SSR.

== Managerial career ==
After retiring as a player, Protasov went into coaching, and led Olympiacos to the Greek title in 2003. In 2005, he coached Romanian team Steaua București.

=== Dnipro Dnipropetrovsk ===
In December 2005, Oleh Protasov returned in Ukraine to coach his hometown team, Dnipro Dnipropetrovsk, after an impressive UEFA Cup performance with Steaua București. Protasov left by his own choice and was on very good terms with the entire team and owners of the club.

In his first 2005–06 season as Dnipro Dnipropetrovsk's coach, Oleh Protasov led the team to a 6th-place finish in the Ukrainian Premier League. In the next, 2006–07 season, Protasov improved on this, finishing 4th in the league.

In the 2007–08 season his side unexpectedly led the title race ahead of the winter break, before a poor second half left his side in 4th once again. Dnipro sacked him on 29 August 2008 after an embarrassing defeat from AC Bellinzona in UEFA cup qualification match.

=== Kuban Krasnodar ===
After that, Protasov took over FC Kuban Krasnodar in the nearby region of Russia. Kuban had been recently relegated to the Russian First League. Under Protasov's leadership, the club finished 2nd in the league, with an 8-point lead over their nearest competitors. This finish earned them right to be promoted to the Russian Premier League.

However FC Kuban was affected by the 2008 financial crisis, which greatly decreased the club's budget. In a mutual agreement with the club, Protasov left the club on 19 November 2008.

=== Iraklis ===
Then, he signed a two-year deal worth 400,000 euro per year with Iraklis, starting from the summer of 2009. On 30 October, it was announced by Iraklis the termination of their contract, after 5 continual defeats in Super League and Greek Cup.

=== Astra Giurgiu ===
On 13 October 2014, Oleg became manager of FC Astra Giurgiu. He was sacked on 2 March 2015.

=== Aris ===
Protasov agreed on a three years contract with Aris, though Arvanitidis expulsion as head of the football department of the club, led to amateur Aris to terminate the deal after 15 minutes of its announcement.

== Personal life ==
Protasov is married to Natalia (née – Lemeshko), a daughter of Yevhen Lemeshko. They met through a post letter exchange. She wrote him a letter after reading his interview in "Nedelya". He is a naturalised citizen of Greece and can speak Greek, alongside English, Russian and his native Ukrainian.

== Career statistics ==
=== Club ===
Appearances and goals by club, season and competition
Club	Season	League		Cup		Continental		Total	
Club	Season	Apps	Goals	Apps	Goals	Apps	Goals	Apps	Goals
Dnipro Dnipropetrovsk	1982	4	1	0	0	0	0	4	1
Dnipro Dnipropetrovsk	1983	21	7	2	0	0	0	23	7
Dnipro Dnipropetrovsk	1984	34	17	2	2	6	0	42	19
Dnipro Dnipropetrovsk	1985	33	35	2	1	6	4	41	40
Dnipro Dnipropetrovsk	1986	23	17	1	1	2	0	26	18
Dnipro Dnipropetrovsk	1987	30	18	4	3	0	0	34	21
Dynamo Kyiv	1988	29	11	5	2	0	0	34	13
Dynamo Kyiv	1989	26	7	6	2	3	1	35	10
Dynamo Kyiv	1990	16	12	1	1	0	0	17	13
Olympiacos	1990–91	29	11	2	1	0	0	31	12
Olympiacos	1991–92	21	15	6	3	0	0	27	18
Olympiacos	1992–93	24	14	9	3	4	1	37	18
Olympiacos	1993–94	9	8	4	1	1	0	14	9
Gamba Osaka	1994	27	11	4	4	3	0	34	15
Gamba Osaka	1995	28	13	0	0	0	0	28	13
Veria	1997	30	4	4	1	0	0	34	5
Veria	1998	32	7	1	0	0	0	33	7
Proodeftiki	1998	28	5	0	0	0	0	28	5
Career total		444	213	53	25	25	6	522	244

=== International ===
Appearances and goals by national team and year
National team	Year	Apps	Goals
Soviet Union	1984	5	2
Soviet Union	1985	12	8
Soviet Union	1986	3	0
Soviet Union	1987	9	2
Soviet Union	1988	18	10
Soviet Union	1989	8	3
Soviet Union	1990	11	3
Soviet Union	1991	2	1
Total		68	29
Ukraine	1994	1	0
Total		1	0

Scores and results list the Soviet Union's goal tally first, score column indicates score after each Protasov goal.

List of international goals scored by Oleh Protasov
No.	Date	Venue	Opponent	Score	Result	Competition
1	15 May 1984	Kouvolan keskuskenttä, Kouvola, Finland	Finland	3–1	3–1	Friendly
2	2 June 1984	Wembley Stadium (1923), London, England	England	2–0	2–0	Friendly
3	28 January 1985	Maharaja College Stadium, Kochi, India	Iran	2–0	2–0	Nehru Cup 1985
4	27 March 1985	Boris Paichadze Stadium, Tbilisi, Soviet Union	Austria	2–0	2–0	Friendly
5	2 May 1985	Luzhniki Stadium, Moscow, Soviet Union	Switzerland	1–0	4–0	1986 World Cup qualification
6	2 May 1985	Luzhniki Stadium, Moscow, Soviet Union	Switzerland	2–0	4–0	1986 World Cup qualification
7	5 June 1985	Idrætsparken, Copenhagen, Denmark	Denmark	1–2	2–4	1986 World Cup qualification
8	7 August 1985	Luzhniki Stadium, Moscow, Soviet Union	Romania	1–0	2–0	Friendly
9	25 September 1985	Luzhniki Stadium, Moscow, Soviet Union	Denmark	1–0	1–0	1986 World Cup qualification
10	16 October 1985	Luzhniki Stadium, Moscow, Soviet Union	Republic of Ireland	2–0	2–0	1986 World Cup qualification
11	23 September 1987	Luzhniki Stadium, Moscow, Soviet Union	Greece	2–0	3–0	Friendly
12	28 October 1987	Lokomotiv Stadium (Tavriya), Simferopol, Soviet Union	Iceland	2–0	2–0	Euro 1988 qualifying
13	23 March 1988	Olympic Stadium (Athens), Athens, Greece	Greece	1–0	4–0	Friendly
14	23 March 1988	Olympic Stadium (Athens), Athens, Greece	Greece	3–0	4–0	Friendly
15	23 March 1988	Olympic Stadium (Athens), Athens, Greece	Greece	4–0	4–0	Friendly
16	31 March 1988	Olympic Stadium (Berlin), Berlin, West Germany	Argentina	3–1	4–2	Four Nations Tournament
17	31 March 1988	Olympic Stadium (Berlin), Berlin, West Germany	Argentina	4–2	4–2	Four Nations Tournament
18	27 April 1988	Štadión Antona Malatinského, Trnava, Czechoslovakia	Czechoslovakia	1–1	1–1	Friendly
19	1 June 1988	Lokomotiv Stadium (Moscow), Moscow, Soviet Union	Poland	2–1	2–1	Friendly
20	15 June 1988	AWD-Arena, Hanover, West Germany	Republic of Ireland	1–1	1–1	Euro 1988 Group Stage
21	22 June 1988	Neckarstadion, Stuttgart, West Germany	Italy	2–0	2–0	Euro 1988 Semi-finals
22	27 November 1988	Al-Sadaqua Walsalam Stadium, Kuwait City, Kuwait	Kuwait	1–0	2–0	Friendly
23	26 April 1989	Olimpiysky National Sports Complex, Kyiv, Soviet Union	East Germany	3–0	3–0	1990 World Cup qualification
24	15 November 1989	Lokomotiv Stadium (Tavriya), Simferopol, Soviet Union	Turkey	1–0	2–0	1990 World Cup qualification
25	15 November 1989	Lokomotiv Stadium (Tavriya), Simferopol, Soviet Union	Turkey	2–0	2–0	1990 World Cup qualification
26	24 February 1990	Stanford Stadium, Palo Alto, United States of America	United States	3–1	3–1	Friendly
27	28 March 1990	Olimpiysky National Sports Complex, Kyiv, Soviet Union	Netherlands	1–0	2–1	Friendly
28	18 June 1990	Stadio San Nicola, Bari, Italy	Cameroon	1–0	4–0	World Cup 1990 Group Stage
29	13 November 1991	GSZ Stadium, Larnaca, Cyprus	Cyprus	1–0	3–0	Euro 1992 qualifying

== Honours ==
Dnipro Dnipropetrovsk

- Soviet Top League: 1983
- USSR Federation Cup: 1986

Dynamo Kyiv

- Soviet Top League: 1990
- Soviet Cup: 1989–90

Olympiacos

- Greek Cup: 1991–92
- Greek Super Cup: 1992

Soviet Union

- UEFA European Championship runner-up: 1988

Individual

- ADN Eastern European Footballer of the Season: 1985
- Soviet Footballer of the Year: 1987
- Soviet Top League top scorer: 1985, 1987, 1990
- UEFA Silver Boot: 1986 (behind Marco van Basten, holder of the European Golden Shoe)
- Oleh Blokhin club: 275 goals
- Gazeta Sporturilor Romania Coach of the Year: 2005
