= Toshihiro Yamaguchi =

Japanese footballer

Toshihiro Yamaguchi 山口 敏弘
Personal information
- Full name: Toshihiro Yamaguchi
- Date of birth: November 19, 1971 (age 54)
- Place of birth: Kumamoto, Japan
- Height: 1.76 m (5 ft 9 1/2 in)
- Positions: Midfielder; forward

Youth career
- 1987–1989: Hokuyo High School
- 1990–1992: Kindai University

Senior career*
Years	Team	Apps	(Gls)
1993–1996	Gamba Osaka	97	(26)
1996–1997	Kyoto Purple Sanga	16	(1)
1998–2000	Sanfrecce Hiroshima	45	(4)
Total		158	(31)

International career
1994–1995	Japan	4	(0)
Medal record
Sanfrecce Hiroshima
Runner-up	Emperor's Cup	1999
- * Club domestic league appearances and goals

Toshihiro Yamaguchi (山口 敏弘, Yamaguchi Toshihiro; born November 19, 1971) is a former Japanese football player. He played for Japan national team.

== Club career ==
Yamaguchi was born in Kumamoto Prefecture on November 19, 1971. After dropped out from Kindai University, he joined Gamba Osaka in 1993. He became a regular player from 1994. He moved to Kyoto Purple Sanga in 1996 and played until 1997. In June 1998, he signed with Sanfrecce Hiroshima. The club won the 2nd place at 1999 Emperor's Cup. He retired end of 2000 season.

== National team career ==
On July 8, 1994, Yamaguchi debuted for Japan national team against Ghana. He also played at 1995 King Fahd Cup. He played 4 games for Japan until 1995.

== Career statistics ==
=== Club ===
Appearances and goals by club, season and competition
Club	Season	League			Emperor's Cup		J.League Cup		Total	
Club	Season	Division	Apps	Goals	Apps	Goals	Apps	Goals	Apps	Goals
Gamba Osaka	1993	J1 League	6	1	2	3	5	2	13	6
Gamba Osaka	1994	J1 League	39	16	4	0	3	0	46	16
Gamba Osaka	1995	J1 League	41	9	0	0	—		41	9
Gamba Osaka	1996	J1 League	11	0	0	0	0	0	11	0
Kyoto Purple Sanga	1996	J1 League	9	0	2	0	11	0	22	0
Kyoto Purple Sanga	1997	J1 League	7	1	2	0	4	0	13	1
Sanfrecce Hiroshima	1998	J1 League	17	2	3	0	0	0	20	2
Sanfrecce Hiroshima	1999	J1 League	26	2	2	0	3	0	31	2
Sanfrecce Hiroshima	2000	J1 League	2	0	0	0	1	0	3	0
Career total			158	31	11	3	27	2	200	36

=== International ===
Japan national team
Year	Apps	Goals
1994	2	0
1995	2	0
Total	4	0
