= Takahiro Shimada =

Japanese footballer

Takahiro Shimada 島田 貴裕
Personal information
- Full name: Takahiro Shimada
- Date of birth: February 9, 1965 (age 61)
- Place of birth: Osaka, Japan
- Height: 1.82 m (5 ft 11 1/2 in)
- Position: Defender

Youth career
- 1980–1982: Naniwa High School
- 1983–1986: Osaka University of Health and Sport Sciences

Senior career*
Years	Team	Apps	(Gls)
1987–1997	Gamba Osaka	199	(9)
Total		199	(9)
Medal record
Gamba Osaka
Winner	Emperor's Cup	1990
- * Club domestic league appearances and goals

Takahiro Shimada (島田 貴裕, Shimada Takahiro; born February 9, 1965) is a former Japanese football player.

== Playing career ==
Shimada was born in Osaka Prefecture on February 9, 1965. After graduating from Osaka University of Health and Sport Sciences, he joined Matsushita Electric (later Gamba Osaka) in 1987. He became a regular player as center back from first season. In 1990, the club won the champions Emperor's Cup, which was the first major title in the club's history. He retired at the end of the 1997 season.

== Coaching career ==
After retirement, Shimada became a coach for Gamba Osaka in 1998, managing its youth team until 2010. From 2011 to 2016, he served as the coach of the junior youth team, before returning as a youth team coach in 2017 and becoming its head coach in 2018.

== Club statistics ==
Club performance			League		Cup		League Cup		Total	
Season	Club	League	Apps	Goals	Apps	Goals	Apps	Goals	Apps	Goals
Japan			League		Emperor's Cup		J.League Cup		Total	
1987/88	Matsushita Electric	JSL Division 2	25	3			1	0	26	3
1988/89	Matsushita Electric	JSL Division 1	22	2			1	0	23	2
1989/90	Matsushita Electric	JSL Division 1	21	0			0	0	21	0
1990/91	Matsushita Electric	JSL Division 1	21	0			1	0	22	0
1991/92	Matsushita Electric	JSL Division 1	19	1			3	0	22	1
1992	Gamba Osaka	J1 League	-				0	0	0	0
1993	Gamba Osaka	J1 League	12	0	0	0	1	0	13	0
1994	Gamba Osaka	J1 League	16	2	0	0	3	1	19	3
1995	Gamba Osaka	J1 League	38	0	3	0	-		41	0
1996	Gamba Osaka	J1 League	10	1	4	0	11	0	25	1
1997	Gamba Osaka	J1 League	15	0	1	0	6	0	22	0
Total			199	9	8	0	27	1	234	10
