= Akhrik Tsveiba =

Footballer (born 1966)

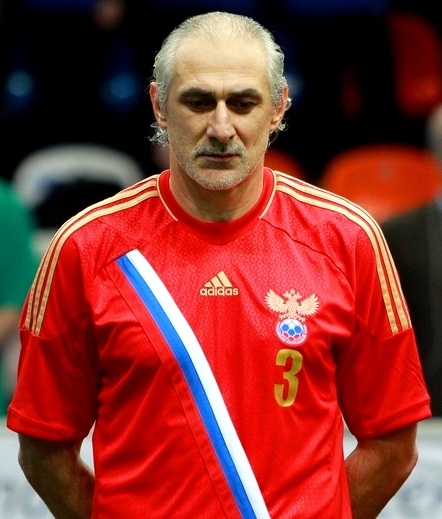
- Tsveiba in 2014

Personal information
- Full name: Akhrik Sokratovich Tsveiba
- Date of birth: 10 September 1966 (age 60)
- Place of birth: Gudauta, Abkhaz ASSR, Georgian SSR, Soviet Union
- Height: 1.82 m (6 ft 0 in)
- Position: Defender

Senior career*
Years	Team	Apps	(Gls)
1983–1984	Dinamo Sukhumi		
1984	SKA-Khabarovsk	4	(0)
1984–1989	Dinamo Tbilisi	79	(0)
1990–1993	Dynamo Kyiv	79	(3)
1992–1993	→ Dynamo-2 Kyiv	12	(0)
1993	KAMAZ Naberezhnye Chelny	11	(0)
1994	Qingdao Hainiu		
1994–1996	Gamba Osaka	75	(2)
1997	Alania Vladikavkaz	24	(0)
1998	Qianwei Huandao	18	(0)
1999–2000	Uralan Elista	44	(1)
2001	Dynamo Moscow	11	(0)
2001–2002	AEK Larnaca		

International career
1990–1991	Soviet Union	18	(1)
1992	CIS	7	(1)
1992	Ukraine	1	(0)
1997	Russia	8	(0)
- * Club domestic league appearances and goals

Akhrik Sokratovich Tsveiba (Russian: Ахрик Сократович Цвейба; born 10 September 1966) is a former professional footballer. At international level, he represented Soviet Union, CIS, Ukraine and Russia national teams.

== Club career ==
Born in Gudauta, Tsveiba began playing youth football with local side M. Chachba. He played as a defender for Dinamo Sukhumi, SKA-Khabarovsk, Dinamo Tbilisi and Dynamo Kyiv, appearing in 123 Soviet league matches. Tsveiba won the 1990 Soviet Top League with Dynamo and was awarded Master of Sports of the USSR.

Tsveiba started his career at Dinamo Sukhumi before playing regularly for Dinamo Tbilisi. In 1990, he left for Dynamo Kyiv, where he was nominated by the Ukraine national team. He then played briefly in Russia before signing with Gamba Osaka. He returned to Russia for Alania Vladikavkaz, where he was nominated by the Russia national team. Tsveiba left for the Chinese team Shanghai Pudong, before spending his late career with the Russian teams Uralan Elista and Dynamo Moscow.

In 2009, he was part of the Russia national team squad that won the 2009 Legends Cup.

== International career ==
Tsveiba was a non-playing squad member at the 1990 FIFA World Cup for the Soviet Union, and at Euro 1992 for the CIS. Tsveiba played for the Ukraine national team against Hungary in a friendly match in August 1992.

He changed his allegiance to Russia in 1998 FIFA World Cup qualification.

== Post-playing career ==
Tsveiba worked as a scout with Dynamo Moscow when the club was managed by Stanislav Cherchesov from 2014 to 2015.

== Personal life ==
His son Sandro Tsveiba is also a professional footballer.

== Career statistics ==
=== Club ===
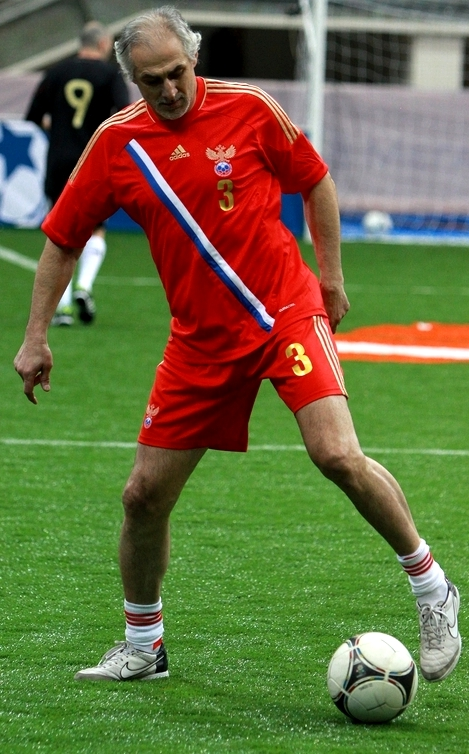
Tsveiba in 2014

Appearances and goals by club, season and competition
Club	Season	League			National cup (Note: Includes Soviet Cup, Ukrainian Cup, Russian Cup, Emperor's Cup, Chinese FA Cup)		League cup (Note: Includes Federation Cup, Russian Premier League Cup, J.League Cup)		Total	
Club	Season	Division	Apps	Goals	Apps	Goals	Apps	Goals	Apps	Goals
Dinamo Sukhumi	1984		0	0					0	0
SKA-Khabarovsk	1984		4	0					4	0
Dinamo Tbilisi	1985	Soviet Top League	0	0					0	0
Dinamo Tbilisi	1986	Soviet Top League	4	0					4	0
Dinamo Tbilisi	1987	Soviet Top League	23	0					23	0
Dinamo Tbilisi	1988	Soviet Top League	24	0					24	0
Dinamo Tbilisi	1989	Soviet Top League	28	0					28	0
Dinamo Tbilisi	Total		79	0					79	0
Dynamo Kyiv	1990	Soviet Top League	20	0					20	0
Dynamo Kyiv	1991	Soviet Top League	24	1					24	1
Dynamo Kyiv	1992	Ukrainian Premier League	9	0					9	0
Dynamo Kyiv	1992–93	Ukrainian Premier League	12	0					12	0
Dynamo Kyiv	Total		65	1					6	1
KAMAZ Naberezhnye Chelny	1993	Top League	11	0					11	0
Gamba Osaka	1994	J1 League	18	1	4	0	0	0	22	1
Gamba Osaka	1995	J1 League	40	1	0	0	–		40	1
Gamba Osaka	1996	J1 League	17	0	3	0	12	0	32	0
Gamba Osaka	Total		75	2	7	0	12	0	94	3
Alania Vladikavkaz	1997	Top League	24	0					24	0
Shanghai Pudong	1998	Jia-B League								
Uralan Elista	1999	Top Division	20	1					20	1
Uralan Elista	2000	Top Division	24	0					24	0
Uralan Elista	Russia		44	1					44	1
Dynamo Moscow	2001	Top Division	11	0					11	0
Career total			313	4	7	0	12	0	332	4

=== International ===
Appearances and goals by national team and year
National team	Year	Apps	Goals
Soviet Union	1990	8	1
Soviet Union	1991	10	0
Total		18	1
CIS	1992	7	1
Ukraine	1992	1	0
Russia	1997	8	0
Career total		34	2
