= Hiromitsu Isogai =

Japanese footballer

Hiromitsu Isogai 礒貝 洋光
Personal information
- Full name: Hiromitsu Isogai
- Date of birth: April 19, 1969 (age 57)
- Place of birth: Uki, Kumamoto, Japan
- Height: 1.76 m (5 ft 9 1/2 in)
- Position: Midfielder

Youth career
- 1985–1987: Teikyo High School
- 1988–1991: Tokai University

Senior career*
| Years | Team | Apps | (Gls) |
| 1992–1996 | Gamba Osaka | 125 | (26) |
| 1997–1998 | Urawa Reds | 10 | (3) |
| Total | | 135 | (29) |

International career
| 1995 | Japan | 2 | (0) |
- * Club domestic league appearances and goals

Hiromitsu Isogai (礒貝 洋光, Isogai Hiromitsu; born April 19, 1969) is a former Japanese football player. He played for Japan national team.

== Club career ==
Isogai was born in Uki on April 19, 1969. After graduating from Tokai University, he joined Gamba Osaka in 1992. He played as regular player from first season. He moved to Urawa Reds in 1997. He retired in July 1998.

== National team career ==
In January 1995, Isogai was selected by the Japan national team for the 1995 King Fahd Cup. At this competition, on January 6, he debuted against Nigeria. On January 8, he also played against Argentina. He played two games for Japan in 1995.

== Club statistics ==
| Club performance | | | League | | Cup | | League Cup | | Total | |
| Season | Club | League | Apps | Goals | Apps | Goals | Apps | Goals | Apps | Goals |
| Japan | | | League | | Emperor's Cup | | J.League Cup | | Total | |
|---|---|---|---|---|---|---|---|---|---|---|
| 1992 | Gamba Osaka | J1 League | - | | 3 | 0 | 8 | 0 | 11 | 0 |
| 1993 | Gamba Osaka | J1 League | 28 | 6 | 2 | 0 | 4 | 0 | 34 | 6 |
| 1994 | Gamba Osaka | J1 League | 40 | 6 | 4 | 0 | 3 | 0 | 47 | 6 |
| 1995 | Gamba Osaka | J1 League | 37 | 13 | 4 | 4 | - | | 41 | 17 |
| 1996 | Gamba Osaka | J1 League | 20 | 1 | 4 | 2 | 9 | 2 | 33 | 5 |
| 1997 | Urawa Reds | J1 League | 10 | 3 | 1 | 0 | 0 | 0 | 11 | 3 |
| 1998 | Urawa Reds | J1 League | 0 | 0 | 0 | 0 | 0 | 0 | 0 | 0 |
| Total | | | 135 | 29 | 18 | 6 | 24 | 2 | 177 | 37 |

== National team statistics ==
Japan national team
| Year | Apps | Goals |
|---|---|---|
| 1995 | 2 | 0 |
| Total | 2 | 0 |
