= Lange (Brazilian footballer) =

Brazilian footballer

Personal information
- Full name: Marcos Antonio Menezes Godoi
- Date of birth: December 18, 1966 (age 59)
- Place of birth: Cesário Lange, Brazil
- Height: 1.68 m (5 ft 6 in)
- Position: Midfielder

Youth career
- São Paulo

Senior career*
Years	Team	Apps	(Gls)
1985–1987	São Paulo	13	(1)
1987–1991	Yanmar Diesel	82	(0)
1991–1992	Gamba Osaka	21	(0)
- * Club domestic league appearances and goals

Marcos Antonio Menezes Godoi (born December 18, 1966) is a former Brazilian football player.

== Club statistics ==
Club performance			League		Cup		League Cup		Total	
Season	Club	League	Apps	Goals	Apps	Goals	Apps	Goals	Apps	Goals
Japan			League		Emperor's Cup		League Cup		Total	
1987/88	Yanmar Diesel	JSL Division 1	19	4	1	0	0	0	20	4
1988/89	Yanmar Diesel	JSL Division 1	16	5	0	0	4	1	20	6
1989/90	Yanmar Diesel	JSL Division 1	21	6	3	1	2	0	26	7
1990/91	Yanmar Diesel	JSL Division 1	18	5			0	0	18	5
1991/92	Matsushita Electric	JSL Division 1	8	1			0	0	8	1
1992	Gamba Osaka	J1 League	-				9	0	9	0
Career total			82	21	4	1	15	1	101	23
