= Naoki Hiraoka =

Japanese footballer and manager

Naoki Hiraoka 平岡 直起
Personal information
- Full name: Naoki Hiraoka
- Date of birth: May 24, 1973 (age 53)
- Place of birth: Sakai, Osaka, Japan
- Height: 1.73 m (5 ft 8 in)
- Position: Midfielder

Youth career
- 1989–1991: Hatsushiba High School

Senior career*
| Years | Team | Apps | (Gls) |
| 1992–2000 | Gamba Osaka | 156 | (11) |
| 2000–2002 | Nagoya Grampus Eight | 25 | (3) |
| 2003–2004 | Shimizu S-Pulse | 19 | (1) |
| 2005–2007 | FC Gifu | 41 | (6) |
| Total | | 241 | (21) |

Managerial career
- 2008: MIO Biwako Kusatsu
- * Club domestic league appearances and goals

Naoki Hiraoka (平岡 直起, Hiraoka Naoki; born May 24, 1973) is a former Japanese football player and manager.

== Playing career ==
Hiraoka was born in Sakai on May 24, 1973. After graduating from high school, he joined his local club Gamba Osaka in 1992. He debuted in 1994 and became a regular player as left side midfielder and left side back in 1995. However, he could hardly play in the match in 2000 and he moved to Nagoya Grampus Eight in August 2000. In 2003 he moved to Shimizu S-Pulse and played in 2 seasons. In 2005, he moved to Regional Leagues club FC Gifu. He played many matches and the club was promoted to Japan Football League from 2007. In 2007, the club won the 3rd place and was promoted to J2 League. However, he retired at the end of the 2007 season.

== Coaching career ==
After retirement, Hiraoka became a manager for newly was promoted to Japan Football League club, MIO Biwako Kusatsu in 2008. He managed the club until August 2008.

== Club statistics ==
| Club performance | | | League | | Cup | | League Cup | | Total | |
| Season | Club | League | Apps | Goals | Apps | Goals | Apps | Goals | Apps | Goals |
| Japan | | | League | | Emperor's Cup | | J.League Cup | | Total | |
|---|---|---|---|---|---|---|---|---|---|---|
| 1992 | Gamba Osaka | J1 League | - | | 0 | 0 | 0 | 0 | 0 | 0 |
| 1993 | Gamba Osaka | J1 League | 0 | 0 | 0 | 0 | 0 | 0 | 0 | 0 |
| 1994 | Gamba Osaka | J1 League | 11 | 0 | 1 | 0 | 1 | 0 | 13 | 0 |
| 1995 | Gamba Osaka | J1 League | 34 | 5 | 4 | 0 | - | | 38 | 5 |
| 1996 | Gamba Osaka | J1 League | 24 | 1 | 3 | 1 | 12 | 0 | 39 | 2 |
| 1997 | Gamba Osaka | J1 League | 28 | 1 | 3 | 2 | 6 | 1 | 37 | 4 |
| 1998 | Gamba Osaka | J1 League | 26 | 1 | 1 | 0 | 4 | 0 | 31 | 1 |
| 1999 | Gamba Osaka | J1 League | 29 | 3 | 1 | 0 | 4 | 1 | 34 | 4 |
| 2000 | Gamba Osaka | J1 League | 4 | 0 | 0 | 0 | 4 | 0 | 8 | 0 |
| 2000 | Nagoya Grampus Eight | J1 League | 2 | 0 | 1 | 0 | 2 | 0 | 5 | 0 |
| 2001 | Nagoya Grampus Eight | J1 League | 12 | 2 | 0 | 0 | 2 | 0 | 14 | 2 |
| 2002 | Nagoya Grampus Eight | J1 League | 12 | 1 | 0 | 0 | 3 | 0 | 15 | 1 |
| 2003 | Shimizu S-Pulse | J1 League | 8 | 0 | 1 | 0 | 2 | 0 | 11 | 0 |
| 2004 | Shimizu S-Pulse | J1 League | 11 | 1 | 0 | 0 | 4 | 0 | 15 | 1 |
| 2005 | FC Gifu | Regional Leagues | 4 | 3 | - | | - | | 4 | 3 |
| 2006 | FC Gifu | Regional Leagues | 12 | 2 | 2 | 0 | - | | 14 | 2 |
| 2007 | FC Gifu | Football League | 25 | 1 | 1 | 0 | - | | 26 | 1 |
| Total | | | 242 | 21 | 18 | 3 | 44 | 2 | 304 | 26 |
