= Hiroto Yamamura =

Japanese footballer

Hiroto Yamamura 山村 博土
Personal information
- Full name: Hiroto Yamamura
- Date of birth: July 12, 1974 (age 52)
- Place of birth: Shizuoka, Japan
- Height: 1.70 m (5 ft 7 in)
- Position: Forward

Youth career
- 1990–1992: Shizuoka Gakuen High School

Senior career*
Years	Team	Apps	(Gls)
1993–1996	Gamba Osaka	18	(3)
Total		18	(3)
- * Club domestic league appearances and goals

Hiroto Yamamura (山村 博土, Yamamura Hiroto; born July 12, 1974) is a former Japanese football player.

== Playing career ==
Yamamura was born in Shizuoka Prefecture on July 12, 1974. After graduating from Shizuoka Gakuen High School, he joined Gamba Osaka in 1993. He played many matches as forward in 1994 and 1995. However he could not play at all in the match in 1996 and retired end of 1996 season.

== Career statistics ==
Appearances and goals by club, season and competition
Club	Season	League			Emperor's Cup		J.League Cup		Total	
Club	Season	Division	Apps	Goals	Apps	Goals	Apps	Goals	Apps	Goals
Gamba Osaka	1993	J1 League	0	0			0	0	0	0
Gamba Osaka	1994	J1 League	8	2	1	0	0	0	9	2
Gamba Osaka	1995	J1 League	10	1	2	0	—		12	1
Gamba Osaka	1996	J1 League	0	0			0	0	0	0
Career total			18	3	3	0	0	0	21	3
