= Yuji Yaso =

Japanese footballer

Yuji Yaso 八十 祐治
Personal information
- Full name: Yuji Yaso
- Date of birth: October 31, 1969 (age 56)
- Place of birth: Takatsuki, Osaka, Japan
- Height: 1.80 m (5 ft 11 in)
- Position: Midfielder

Youth career
- Ibaraki High School
- Kobe University

Senior career*
Years	Team	Apps	(Gls)
1993–1994	Gamba Osaka	3	(0)
1995	Vissel Kobe	0	(0)
1996–1997	Albirex Niigata		
1998–2000	Yokogawa Electric		
- * Club domestic league appearances and goals

Yuji Yaso (八十 祐治, Yaso Yuji; born October 31, 1969) is a former Japanese football player.

== Playing career ==
Yaso was born in Takatsuki on October 31, 1969. After graduating from Kobe University, he joined his local club Gamba Osaka in 1993. Although he played 3 matches in 1993, he could not play at all in the match in 1994. In 1995, he moved to Japan Football League club Vissel Kobe. However he could hardly play in the match. In 1996, he moved to Regional Leagues club Albireo Niigata (later Albirex Niigata). In 1998, he moved to Regional Leagues club Yokogawa Electric. The club was promoted to Japan Football League from 1999. He played many matches as midfielder for the club and retired end of 2000 season.

== Club statistics ==
Club performance			League		Cup		League Cup		Total	
Season	Club	League	Apps	Goals	Apps	Goals	Apps	Goals	Apps	Goals
Japan			League		Emperor's Cup		League Cup		Total	
1993	Gamba Osaka	J1 League	3	0	0	0	0	0	3	0
1994	Gamba Osaka	J1 League	0	0	0	0	0	0	0	0
1995	Vissel Kobe	Football League	0	0	1	0	-		1	0
1996	Albireo Niigata	Regional Leagues			0	0	-			
1997	Albirex Niigata	Regional Leagues			0	0	-			
1998	Yokogawa Electric	Regional Leagues			-		-			
1999	Yokogawa Electric	Football League	22	0	-		-		22	0
2000	Yokogawa Electric	Football League	21	2	1	0	-		22	2
Career total			46	2	2	0	0	0	48	2
