= Masafumi Nakaguchi =

Japanese footballer and manager

Personal information
- Date of birth: 10 April 1972 (age 54)
- Place of birth: Tokushima, Tokushima, Japan
- Height: 1.75 m (5 ft 9 in)
- Position: Midfielder

Youth career
- 1988–1990: Kunimi Senior HS
- 1991–1994: Osaka University of Commerce

Senior career*
Years	Team	Apps	(Gls)
1995–1996	Gamba Osaka	0	(0)
1997–2001	Sagawa Express Osaka		

Managerial career
- 2002–2005: Sagawa Express Osaka (assistant)
- 2006: Sagawa Express Osaka
- 2007: Sagawa Express
- 2008–2012: Sagawa Shiga
- 2013–2015: Gamba Osaka (assistant)
- 2016–2019: MIO Biwako Shiga
- 2020: Vanraure Hachinohe
- * Club domestic league appearances and goals

Masafumi Nakaguchi (中口 雅史, Nakaguchi Masafumi; born 10 April 1972) is a Japanese former footballer.

== Career statistics ==
=== Club ===
Club	Season	League			National Cup		League Cup		Continental		Other		Total	
Club	Season	Division	Apps	Goals	Apps	Goals	Apps	Goals	Apps	Goals	Apps	Goals	Apps	Goals
Gamba Osaka	1995	J.League	0	0	0	0	0	0	0	0	0	0	0	0
Gamba Osaka	1996	J.League	0	0	0	0	0	0	0	0	0	0	0	0
Career total			0	0	0	0	0	0	0	0	0	0	0	0

== Managerial statistics ==
As of 23 September 2020.

Managerial record by team and tenure
Team	From	To	Record				
Team	From	To	P	W	D	L	Win %
Sagawa Shiga	2010	2012	103	57	21	25	55.3
MIO Biwako Shiga	2016	2019	124	42	30	52	33.9
Vanraure Hachinohe	2020	present	16	5	3	8	31.3
Total			243	104	54	85	42.8
