= Keiju Karashima =

Japanese footballer and manager

Keiju Karashima 辛島 啓珠
Personal information
- Full name: Keiju Karashima
- Date of birth: June 24, 1971 (age 55)
- Place of birth: Kyoto, Japan
- Height: 1.83 m (6 ft 0 in)
- Position: Defender

Youth career
- 1987–1989: Yamashiro High School

College career
| Years | Team | Apps | (Gls) |
| 1990–1993 | University of Tsukuba | | |

Senior career*
| Years | Team | Apps | (Gls) |
| 1994–1996 | Gamba Osaka | 67 | (3) |
| 1997 | Avispa Fukuoka | 1 | (0) |
| 1998–1999 | Kyoto Purple Sanga | 1 | (0) |
| 2000–2001 | Mito HollyHock | 36 | (0) |
| Total | | 105 | (3) |

Managerial career
- 2005–2007: Matsumoto Yamaga FC
- 2010–2012: Japan Soccer College
- 2013: FC Gifu
- 2014: Sagawa Printing Kyoto
- 2015: SC Sagamihara
- 2016–2017: Albirex Niigata Ladies
- 2018: Suzuka Unlimited FC
- 2019–2020: Mynavi Vegalta Sendai Ladies
- 2022–: Nankatsu SC
- * Club domestic league appearances and goals

Keiju Karashima (辛島 啓珠, Karashima Keiju; born June 24, 1971) is a Japanese former football player and manager.

== Playing career ==
Karashima was born in Kyoto on June 24, 1971. After graduating from University of Tsukuba, he joined Gamba Osaka in 1994. He became a regular player as center back from first season. However his opportunity to play decreased for injuries from 1995. In 1997, he moved to Avispa Fukuoka. However he could hardly play in the match and left the club end of 1997 season. After a blank for 10 months, in October 1998, he joined his local club Kyoto Purple Sanga. Although he played until 1999, he could hardly play in the match. In 2000, he moved to newly was promoted to J2 League club, Mito HollyHock. Although he played as regular player in 2000, his opportunity to play decreased in 2001 and retired in September 2001.

== Coaching career ==
After retirement, Karashima started coaching career at Kashiwa Reysol in October 2001. He coached youth team until June 2004. In 2005, he signed with Regional Leagues club Matsumoto Yamaga FC and became a manager. He managed the club until 2007. In 2008, he moved to newly was promoted to J2 League club, FC Gifu. He became a coach for the senior team and manager for reserve team. In 2009, he moved to Regional Leagues club Japan Soccer College and became a coach. In 2010, he became a manager and managed the club until 2012. In 2013, he returned to FC Gifu and became a coach under manager Koji Gyotoku. In August, Gyotoku was sacked and Karashima succeeded him in the role. In 2014, he moved to Japan Football League club Sagawa Printing Kyoto based in his local area. In 2015, he moved to J3 League club SC Sagamihara and managed the club until November. In 2016, he signed with L.League club Albirex Niigata Ladies. The club won the 2nd place 2016 Empress's Cup. He managed the club until 2017. In 2018, he moved to Regional Leagues club Suzuka Unlimited FC. In 2019, he signed with L.League club Mynavi Vegalta Sendai Ladies.

== Club statistics ==
| Season | Club | League | League | | Emperor's Cup | | J.League Cup | | Total | |
| Season | Club | League | Apps | Goals | Apps | Goals | Apps | Goals | Apps | Goals |
|---|---|---|---|---|---|---|---|---|---|---|
| 1994 | Gamba Osaka | J1 League | 42 | 3 | 0 | 0 | 3 | 0 | 45 | 3 |
| 1995 | Gamba Osaka | J1 League | 14 | 0 | 0 | 0 | – | | 14 | 0 |
| 1996 | Gamba Osaka | J1 League | 11 | 0 | 0 | 0 | 9 | 0 | 20 | 0 |
| 1997 | Avispa Fukuoka | J1 League | 1 | 0 | 0 | 0 | 0 | 0 | 1 | 0 |
| 1998 | Kyoto Purple Sanga | J1 League | 1 | 0 | 0 | 0 | 0 | 0 | 1 | 0 |
| 1999 | Kyoto Purple Sanga | J1 League | 0 | 0 | 0 | 0 | 0 | 0 | 0 | 0 |
| 2000 | Mito HollyHock | J2 League | 30 | 0 | 3 | 0 | 2 | 0 | 35 | 0 |
| 2001 | Mito HollyHock | J2 League | 6 | 0 | 0 | 0 | 1 | 0 | 7 | 0 |
| Total | | | 105 | 3 | 3 | 0 | 15 | 0 | 123 | 3 |

== Managerial statistics ==
| Team | From | To | Record | | | | |
| Team | From | To | G | W | D | L | Win % |
|---|---|---|---|---|---|---|---|
| Matsumoto Yamaga FC | 2005 | 2007 | 41 | 29 | 5 | 7 | 70.73 |
| FC Gifu Second | 2008 | 2008 | 9 | 9 | 0 | 0 | 100.00 |
| Japan Soccer College | 2010 | 2012 | 42 | 34 | 5 | 3 | 80.95 |
| FC Gifu | 2013 | 2013 | 13 | 3 | 4 | 6 | 23.08 |
| Sagawa Printing Kyoto | 2014 | 2014 | 26 | 20 | 1 | 5 | 76.92 |
| SC Sagamihara | 2015 | 2015 | 33 | 15 | 6 | 12 | 45.45 |
| Total | | | 164 | 110 | 21 | 33 | 67.07 |
