= Kenji Honnami =

Japanese footballer and manager

Kenji Honnami 本並 健治
Personal information
- Full name: Kenji Honnami
- Date of birth: June 23, 1964 (age 62)
- Place of birth: Hirakata, Osaka, Japan
- Height: 1.86 m (6 ft 1 in)
- Position: Goalkeeper

Youth career
- 1980–1982: Seifu High School

College career
| Years | Team | Apps | (Gls) |
| 1983–1986 | Osaka University of Commerce | | |

Senior career*
| Years | Team | Apps | (Gls) |
| 1987–1997 | Gamba Osaka | 182 | (0) |
| 1997–2001 | Tokyo Verdy | 85 | (0) |
| Total | | 267 | (0) |

International career
| 1994 | Japan | 3 | (0) |

Managerial career
- 2012–2016: Konomiya Speranza Osaka-Takatsuki
Medal record
Gamba Osaka
| Winner | Emperor's Cup | 1990 |
- * Club domestic league appearances and goals

Kenji Honnami (本並 健治, Honnami Kenji; born June 23, 1964) is a former Japanese football player and manager. He played for Japan national team.

== Club career ==
Honnami was born in Hirakata on June 23, 1964. After graduating from Osaka University of Commerce, he joined Japan Soccer League club Matsushita Electric (later Gamba Osaka) in 1986. The club won 1990 Emperor's Cup. In 1992, Japan Soccer League was folded and founded new league J1 League. Although he became a regular goalkeeper, he lost opportunity to play from 1996. He moved to Verdy Kawasaki (later Tokyo Verdy) in the middle of 1997 season. Although he was reserve goalkeeper behind Shinkichi Kikuchi, Honnami became a regular goalkeeper from 1999. He retired with his rival Kikuchi end of 2001 season.

== International career ==
On May 29, 1994, Honnami debuted for Japan national team against France. He played 3 games for Japan in 1994.

== Coaching career ==
In August 2012, Honnami became a manager for L.League club Speranza FC Osaka-Takatsuki (later Konomiya Speranza Osaka-Takatsuki). He resigned end of 2016 season.

== Away from football ==
He joined SASUKE 39 at 28 December 2021.He has given number 51. He was member of Akko Gundan (Red Tigers). He failed Stage 1 at Rolling Hill .

== Career statistics ==
=== Club ===
| Club performance | | | League | | Cup | | League Cup | | Total | |
| Season | Club | League | Apps | Goals | Apps | Goals | Apps | Goals | Apps | Goals |
| Japan | | | League | | Emperor's Cup | | J.League Cup | | Total | |
|---|---|---|---|---|---|---|---|---|---|---|
| 1987/88 | Matsushita Electric | JSL Division 2 | 25 | 0 | | | 0 | 0 | 25 | 0 |
| 1988/89 | Matsushita Electric | JSL Division 1 | 16 | 0 | | | 0 | 0 | 16 | 0 |
| 1989/90 | Matsushita Electric | JSL Division 1 | 10 | 0 | | | 1 | 0 | 11 | 0 |
| 1990/91 | Matsushita Electric | JSL Division 1 | 6 | 0 | | | 1 | 0 | 7 | 0 |
| 1991/92 | Matsushita Electric | JSL Division 1 | 1 | 0 | | | 0 | 0 | 1 | 0 |
| 1992 | Gamba Osaka | J1 League | - | | 2 | 0 | 2 | 0 | 4 | 0 |
| 1993 | Gamba Osaka | J1 League | 16 | 0 | 0 | 0 | 0 | 0 | 16 | 0 |
| 1994 | Gamba Osaka | J1 League | 43 | 0 | 4 | 0 | 3 | 0 | 50 | 0 |
| 1995 | Gamba Osaka | J1 League | 49 | 0 | 4 | 0 | - | | 53 | 0 |
| 1996 | Gamba Osaka | J1 League | 16 | 0 | 4 | 0 | 6 | 0 | 26 | 0 |
| 1997 | Gamba Osaka | J1 League | 0 | 0 | 0 | 0 | 2 | 0 | 2 | 0 |
| 1997 | Verdy Kawasaki | J1 League | 11 | 0 | 0 | 0 | 0 | 0 | 11 | 0 |
| 1998 | Verdy Kawasaki | J1 League | 1 | 0 | 1 | 0 | 0 | 0 | 2 | 0 |
| 1999 | Verdy Kawasaki | J1 League | 29 | 0 | 4 | 0 | 2 | 0 | 35 | 0 |
| 2000 | Verdy Kawasaki | J1 League | 29 | 0 | 2 | 0 | 1 | 0 | 32 | 0 |
| 2001 | Tokyo Verdy | J1 League | 15 | 0 | 0 | 0 | 0 | 0 | 15 | 0 |
| Total | | | 267 | 0 | 21 | 0 | 18 | 0 | 306 | 0 |

=== International ===
Japan national team
| Year | Apps | Goals |
|---|---|---|
| 1994 | 3 | 0 |
| Total | 3 | 0 |
