= 1993 J.League =

1st season of J1 League

J.League
- Season: 1993
- Champions: Verdy Kawasaki; 1st J.League title 6th Japanese title
- Asian Club Championship: Verdy Kawasaki
- Matches: 180
- Goals: 532 (2.96 per match)
- Top goalscorer: Ramón Díaz (28 goals)
- Highest attendance: 59,626 - Verdy vs. Marinos (May 15)
- Lowest attendance: 7,469 - Flügels vs. Reds (May 22)
- Average attendance: 17,976

The J.League 1993 season was the inaugural season of the J.League. The league fixtures began on 15 May and ended on 15 December. The first ever Suntory Championship took place in the following year, 9 and 16 January 1994.

== Clubs ==
Locations of clubs participating in the 1993 J.League
Greater Tokyo Area 1993 J.League clubs

Ten clubs participated in J.League during 1993 season:

Club name	Hometown	Stadium (majority games)	Capacity	Head coach
Gamba Osaka	Osaka, Osaka	Osaka Expo '70 Stadium	21,000	(Japan) Kunishige Kamamoto
JEF United Ichihara	Chiba, Chiba	Ichihara Seaside Stadium	14,051	(Japan) Yoshikazu Nagai
Kashima Antlers	Kashima, Ibaraki	Kashima Soccer Stadium	37,638	(Japan) Masakatsu Miyamoto
Nagoya Grampus Eight	Nagoya, Aichi	Paloma Mizuho Rugby Stadium	11,900	(Japan) Ryuzo Hiraki
Sanfrecce Hiroshima	Hiroshima, Hiroshima	Coca-Cola West Hiroshima Stadium	13,800	(Scotland) Stuart Baxter
Shimizu S-Pulse	Shimizu-ku, Shizuoka, Shizuoka Prefecture	Nihondaira Sports Stadium	20,248	(Brazil) Émerson Leão
Urawa Red Diamonds	Saitama, Greater Tokyo Area	Urawa Komaba Stadium	21,500	(Japan) Takaji Mori
Verdy Kawasaki	Kawasaki, Kanagawa	Todoroki Athletics Stadium	26,232	(Japan) Yasutaro Matsuki
Yokohama Flügels	Yokohama	Yokohama Mitsuzawa Stadium	15,454	(Japan) Shu Kamo
Yokohama Marinos	Yokohama	Yokohama Mitsuzawa Stadium	15,454	(Japan) Hidehiko Shimizu

=== Foreign players ===
Club	Player 1	Player 2	Player 3	Player 4	Player 5	Player 6	Non-visa foreign	Former player(s)
Gamba Osaka	(Belarus) Sergei Aleinikov	(Brazil) Flávio Campos	(Brazil) Luís Müller	(Brazil) Rinaldo	(Bulgaria) Kiril Metkov	(China) Jia Xiuquan		
JEF United Ichihara	(Czech Republic) František Mysliveček	(Czech Republic) Pavel Řehák	(Germany) Frank Ordenewitz	(Germany) Pierre Littbarski			(Brazil) Sandro (South Korea) Shin Che-bon	
Kashima Antlers	(Brazil) Alcindo	(Brazil) Carlos	(Brazil) Regis	(Brazil) Santos	(Brazil) Zico			
Nagoya Grampus Eight	(Brazil) Elivélton	(Brazil) Garça	(Brazil) Jorginho	(Brazil) Pita	(England) Gary Lineker	(Netherlands) Dido Havenaar		
Sanfrecce Hiroshima	(Czech Republic) Pavel Černý	(Scotland) Lee Baxter	(South Korea) Noh Jung-yoon	(Sweden) Jan Jönsson	(Sweden) Jean-Paul Vonderburg	(United States) Dan Calichman	(Brazil) Andrey	
Shimizu S-Pulse	(Brazil) Celso	(Brazil) Edu Manga	(Brazil) Marcão	(Brazil) Marco Antônio	(Brazil) Sidmar	(Brazil) Toninho	(Brazil) Ademir	
Urawa Red Diamonds	(Argentina) Marcelo Trivisonno	(Germany) Michael Rummenigge	(Germany) Uwe Rahn	(Slovakia) Miroslav Mentel			(Peru) Edwin Uehara	(Argentina) Marcelo Morales (Argentina) Victor Ferreyra
Verdy Kawasaki	(Brazil) Bismarck	(Brazil) Márcio Amoroso	(Brazil) Paulinho	(Brazil) Paulo	(Brazil) Pereira	(Netherlands) Erik van Rossum	(Bolivia) Ko Ishikawa	(Netherlands) Gène Hanssen (Netherlands) Henny Meijer
Yokohama Flügels	(Argentina) Fernando Moner	(Brazil) Aldro	(Brazil) Angelo	(Brazil) Edu Marangon	(El Salvador) Jaime Rodríguez	(Spain) Raúl Amarilla		
Yokohama Marinos	(Argentina) David Bisconti	(Argentina) Gustavo Zapata	(Argentina) Ramón Díaz	(Brazil) Everton				

== Format ==
In the first year, the league followed split-season format, and each halves (or stages) were known as Suntory Series and NICOS Series for sponsorship purposes. In each series, ten clubs played in double round-robin format, a total of 18 games per club (per series). The games went to golden-goal extra time and penalties if needed after regulation. The clubs were ranked by number of wins, and tie breakers are, in the following order:

- Goal differential
- Goals scored
- Head-to-head results
- Extra match or a coin toss

The club that finished at the top of the table is declared stage champion and qualifies for the Suntory Championship. The first stage winner, hosts the first leg in the championship series. If the same club win both stages, the runners-up of each stages plays against each other and the winners challenges the stage winner at the championship game.

== Results ==
1993.05.15 1-1	Verdy Kawasaki	1-2	Yokohama Marinos	Tokyo National Stadium
	Meijer 19'		Everton 48'; Díaz 59'	Attendance: 59,626

1993.05.16 1-1	Yokohama Flügels	3-2	Shimizu S-Pulse	Yokohama Mitsuzawa Stadium
	Angelo 9'; Moner 57'; Maeda 59'		Edu 42'; Toninho 89'	Attendance: 14,126

1993.05.16 1-1	Sanfrecce Hiroshima	2-1	JEF United Ichihara	Hiroshima Stadium
	Kazama 1'; Kojima 82'		Řehák 67'	Attendance: 11,875

1993.05.16 1-1	Kashima Antlers	5-0	Nagoya Grampus Eight	Kashima Soccer Stadium
	Zico 25', 30', 63'; Alcindo 53', 64'			Attendance: 10,898

1993.05.16 1-1	Gamba Osaka	1-0	Urawa Red Diamonds	Osaka Expo '70 Stadium
	Wada 29'			Attendance: 19,580

1993.05.19 1-2	Shimizu S-Pulse	1-0	Sanfrecce Hiroshima	Nihondaira Sports Stadium
	Toninho 16'			Attendance: 9,183

1993.05.19 1-2	JEF United Ichihara	2-1	Verdy Kawasaki	Tokyo National Stadium
	Littbarski 66'; Sasaki 72'		Kitazawa 68'	Attendance: 46,959

1993.05.19 1-2	Kashima Antlers	3-2	Yokohama Flügels	Kashima Soccer Stadium
	Alcindo 23'; Carlos 35'; Hasegawa 79'		Maeda 53'; Edu 84'	Attendance: 9,403

1993.05.19 1-2	Urawa Red Diamonds	0-3	Nagoya Grampus Eight	Urawa Komaba Stadium
			Moriyama 34', 48'; Goto 85'	Attendance: 9,259

1993.05.19 1-2	Yokohama Marinos	1-0 (aet, GG)	Gamba Osaka	Yokohama Mitsuzawa Stadium
	Bisconti 112'			Attendance: 10,332

1993.05.22 1-3	Nagoya Grampus Eight	1-1 (aet, PK 4-3)	Yokohama Marinos	Paloma Mizuho Rugby Stadium
	Sawairi 77'		Everton 32'	Attendance: 11,267

1993.05.22 1-3	Yokohama Flügels	3-1	Urawa Red Diamonds	Yokohama Mitsuzawa Stadium
	Takada 27'; Maeda 44', 59'		Mizuuchi 72'	Attendance: 7,469

1993.05.22 1-3	Gamba Osaka	0-3	JEF United Ichihara	Osaka Expo '70 Stadium
			Littbarski 28'; Řehák 39'; Ejiri 89'	Attendance: 15,993

1993.05.22 1-3	Shimizu S-Pulse	2-1	Kashima Antlers	Kusanagi Athletic Stadium
	Toninho 57'; Horiike 72'		Carlos 49'	Attendance: 14,713

1993.05.22 1-3	Sanfrecce Hiroshima	1-2	Verdy Kawasaki	Hiroshima Big Arch
	Matsuda 44'		Meijer 37'; Takeda 39'	Attendance: 36,863

1993.05.26 1-4	JEF United Ichihara	1-0	Urawa Red Diamonds	Tokyo National Stadium
	Franta 42'			Attendance: 45,033

1993.05.26 1-4	Verdy Kawasaki	1-0 (aet, GG)	Kashima Antlers	Todoroki Athletics Stadium
	Miura 96'			Attendance: 9,816

1993.05.26 1-4	Gamba Osaka	1-1 (aet, PK 6-7)	Shimizu S-Pulse	Osaka Expo '70 Stadium
	Nagashima 39'		Edu 67'	Attendance: 16,707

1993.05.26 1-4	Nagoya Grampus Eight	1-2	Yokohama Flügels	Paloma Mizuho Rugby Stadium
	Lineker 89'		Maeda 47'; Edu 60' (pen.)	Attendance: 12,544

1993.05.26 1-4	Sanfrecce Hiroshima	1-0	Yokohama Marinos	Hiroshima Stadium
	Takagi 57'			Attendance: 12,858

1993.05.29 1-5	Yokohama Marinos	0-5	JEF United Ichihara	Yokohama Mitsuzawa Stadium
			Kageyama 13'; 38' (o.g.); Řehák 47'; Ejiri 51'; Littbarski 82'	Attendance: 11,152

1993.05.29 1-5	Yokohama Flügels	1-2	Sanfrecce Hiroshima	Kagoshima Kamoike Stadium
	Angelo 11'		Černý 51'; Kazama 80'	Attendance: 15,141

1993.05.29 1-5	Kashima Antlers	4-0	Gamba Osaka	Kashima Soccer Stadium
	Santos 17'; Hasegawa 23', 71'; Alcindo 37'			Attendance: 14,058

1993.05.29 1-5	Shimizu S-Pulse	0-0 (aet, PK 5-6)	Nagoya Grampus Eight	Tokyo National Stadium
				Attendance: 50,475

1993.05.29 1-5	Urawa Red Diamonds	1-1 (aet, PK 4-2)	Verdy Kawasaki	Urawa Komaba Stadium
	Kawano 49'		Hashiratani 6'	Attendance: 9,690

1993.06.02 1-6	Urawa Red Diamonds	0-1	Yokohama Marinos	Urawa Komaba Stadium
			Noda 77'	Attendance: 9,088

1993.06.02 1-6	Kashima Antlers	2-1 (aet, GG)	JEF United Ichihara	Kashima Soccer Stadium
	Alcindo 24'; Carlos 91'		Makino 87'	Attendance: 15,194

1993.06.02 1-6	Yokohama Flügels	0-1	Gamba Osaka	Yokohama Mitsuzawa Stadium
			Nagashima 36'	Attendance: 9,725

1993.06.02 1-6	Shimizu S-Pulse	2-4	Verdy Kawasaki	Kusanagi Athletic Stadium
	Edu 67'; Aoshima 87'		Hashiratani 48'; Takeda 65'; Kitazawa 71'; Miura 89'	Attendance: 18,113

1993.06.02 1-6	Nagoya Grampus Eight	1-4	Sanfrecce Hiroshima	Mizuho Rugby Stadium
	Pita 55' (pen.)		Takagi 6'; Kojima 47'; Kazama 72'; Moriyasu 78'	Attendance: 11,466

1993.06.05 1-7	JEF United Ichihara	1-2 (aet, GG)	Shimizu S-Pulse	Ichihara Seaside Stadium
	Ejiri 35'		Edu 43'; Hasegawa 116'	Attendance: 9,427

1993.06.05 1-7	Yokohama Marinos	0-2	Kashima Antlers	Hakatanomori Athletic Stadium
			Santos 14'; Alcindo 56'	Attendance: 28,595

1993.06.05 1-7	Sanfrecce Hiroshima	1-0	Urawa Red Diamonds	Hiroshima Stadium
	Moriyama 71'			Attendance: 14,605

1993.06.05 1-7	Gamba Osaka	3-1	Nagoya Grampus Eight	Kobe Universiade Memorial Stadium
	Nagashima 15', 37', 84'		Jorginho 9'	Attendance: 38,304

1993.06.05 1-7	Verdy Kawasaki	1-1 (aet, PK 5-4)	Yokohama Flügels	Tokyo National Stadium
	Takeda 51'		Aldro 53'	Attendance: 54,995

1993.06.09 1-8	Shimizu S-Pulse	1-2	Yokohama Marinos	Nihondaira Sports Stadium
	Sawanobori 53'		Yamada 35', 41'	Attendance: 9,464

1993.06.09 1-8	Nagoya Grampus Eight	3-1	Verdy Kawasaki	Tokyo National Stadium
	Sawairi 15', 39'; Yonekura 59'		Totsuka 70'	Attendance: 56,335

1993.06.09 1-8	Kashima Antlers	3-1	Urawa Red Diamonds	Kashima Soccer Stadium
	Kurosaki 2', 33'; Alcindo 59'		Fukuda 2'	Attendance: 15,050

1993.06.09 1-8	Yokohama Flügels	1-0	JEF United Ichihara	Yokohama Mitsuzawa Stadium
	Aldro 89'			Attendance: 13,633

1993.06.09 1-8	Gamba Osaka	1-1 (aet, PK 3-4)	Sanfrecce Hiroshima	Osaka Expo '70 Stadium
	Matsunami 31'		Černý 10'	Attendance: 19,351

1993.06.12 1-9	Yokohama Marinos	3-2	Yokohama Flügels	Yokohama Mitsuzawa Stadium
	Miura 1', 17'; Díaz 21'		Aldro 15'; Moner 82'	Attendance: 11,734

1993.06.12 1-9	Urawa Red Diamonds	2-1	Shimizu S-Pulse	Urawa Komaba Stadium
	Fukuda 61' (pen.); Mizuuchi 66'		Aoshima 34'	Attendance: 9,590

1993.06.12 1-9	Sanfrecce Hiroshima	0-1	Kashima Antlers	Ehime Athletic Stadium
			Kurosaki 36'	Attendance: 25,131

1993.06.12 1-9	JEF United Ichihara	3-1	Nagoya Grampus Eight	Sapporo Atsubetsu Park Stadium
	Ejiri 32'; Řehák 46'; Niimura 57'		Goto 45'	Attendance: 20,947

1993.06.12 1-9	Verdy Kawasaki	1-0 (aet, GG)	Gamba Osaka	Todoroki Athletics Stadium
	Miura 92'			Attendance: 10,058

1993.06.16 1-10	Gamba Osaka	2-1 (aet, GG)	Yokohama Marinos	Osaka Expo '70 Stadium
	Kusaki 89' 109'		Hirakawa 41'	Attendance: 19,247

1993.06.16 1-10	Verdy Kawasaki	2-1	JEF United Ichihara	Todoroki Athletics Stadium
	Hanssen 86'; Takeda 89'		Niimura 13'	Attendance: 10,054

1993.06.16 1-10	Sanfrecce Hiroshima	0-3	Shimizu S-Pulse	Hiroshima Stadium
			Aoshima 7'; Oenoki 41'; Hasegawa 47'	Attendance: 10,054

1993.06.16 1-10	Yokohama Flügels	2-0	Kashima Antlers	Yokohama Mitsuzawa Stadium
	Watanabe 9'; Aldro 71'			Attendance: 14,886

1993.06.16 1-10	Nagoya Grampus Eight	3-1	Urawa Red Diamonds	Paloma Mizuho Rugby Stadium
	Jorginho 25'; Egawa 49'; Sawairi 61'		Motoyoshi 62'	Attendance: 12,227

1993.06.19 1-11	Shimizu S-Pulse	1-0	Yokohama Flügels	Nihondaira Sports Stadium
	Sawanobori 21'			Attendance: 8,726

1993.06.19 1-11	Yokohama Marinos	2-0	Verdy Kawasaki	Tokyo National Stadium
	Hirakawa 42'; Díaz 61'			Attendance: 53,376

1993.06.19 1-11	Nagoya Grampus Eight	0-4	Kashima Antlers	Paloma Mizuho Rugby Stadium
			Alcindo 18', 31', 57'; Hasegawa 78'	Attendance: 10,898

1993.06.19 1-11	JEF United Ichihara	1-0	Sanfrecce Hiroshima	Ichihara Seaside Stadium
	Littbarski 4'			Attendance: 9,042

1993.06.19 1-11	Urawa Red Diamonds	1-3	Gamba Osaka	Urawa Komaba Stadium
	Fukuda 84' (pen.)		Nagashima 22'; Isogai 46'; Matsunami 73'	Attendance: 8,953

1993.06.23 1-12	Shimizu S-Pulse	3-2	Gamba Osaka	Kusanagi Athletic Stadium
	Edu 23', 84'; Mukojima 68'		Flávio 34', 71'	Attendance: 15,703

1993.06.23 1-12	Yokohama Flügels	1-2 (aet, GG)	Nagoya Grampus Eight	Suizenji Stadium
	Maeda 56'		75' (o.g.); Hirano 94'	Attendance: 15,328

1993.06.23 1-12	Yokohama Marinos	3-2	Sanfrecce Hiroshima	Yokohama Mitsuzawa Stadium
	Bisconti 12', 25'; Díaz 31'		Noh Jung-yoon 47', 56'	Attendance: 11,863

1993.06.23 1-12	Urawa Red Diamonds	2-3	JEF United Ichihara	Urawa Komaba Stadium
	Mochizuki 17'; Mizuuchi 51'		Řehák 39', 49', 71'	Attendance: 8,514

1993.06.23 1-12	Kashima Antlers	3-2	Verdy Kawasaki	Kashima Soccer Stadium
	Santos 5'; Alcindo 27'; Koga 80'		Nagai 64'; Takeda 74'	Attendance: 15,777

1993.06.26 1-13	Verdy Kawasaki	1-0	Urawa Red Diamonds	Todoroki Athletics Stadium
	Miura 83'			Attendance: 10,078

1993.06.26 1-13	JEF United Ichihara	1-3	Yokohama Marinos	Ichihara Seaside Stadium
	Littbarski 57'		Díaz 50', 68', 85'	Attendance: 10,116

1993.06.26 1-13	Sanfrecce Hiroshima	1-2 (aet, GG)	Yokohama Flügels	Hiroshima Stadium
	Katanosaka 24'		Watanabe 3'; Sorimachi 94'	Attendance: 13,680

1993.06.26 1-13	Gamba Osaka	2-4	Kashima Antlers	Osaka Expo '70 Stadium
	Müller 31'; Flávio 48'		Santos 50'; Alcindo 52' (pen.); Hasegawa 63'; Kurosaki 76'	Attendance: 20,318

1993.06.26 1-13	Nagoya Grampus Eight	3-1	Shimizu S-Pulse	Gifu Nagaragawa Stadium
	Tsuruta 63'; Sawairi 85'; Goto 89'		Hasegawa 15'	Attendance: 29,102

1993.06.30 1-14	Verdy Kawasaki	1-1 (aet, PK 4-2)	Shimizu S-Pulse	Todoroki Athletics Stadium
	Nagai 12'		48' (o.g.)	Attendance: 10,067

1993.06.30 1-14	Yokohama Marinos	5-1	Urawa Red Diamonds	Yokohama Mitsuzawa Stadium
	Díaz 9', 47', 53'; Bisconti 36'; K. Kimura 39'		Mizuuchi 52'	Attendance: 12,110

1993.06.30 1-14	Sanfrecce Hiroshima	2-0	Nagoya Grampus Eight	Hiroshima Stadium
	Moriyasu 39'; Takagi 62'			Attendance: 9,709

1993.06.30 1-14	Gamba Osaka	2-1	Yokohama Flügels	Osaka Expo '70 Stadium
	Nagashima 14'; Müller 31'		Angelo 89'	Attendance: 16,506

1993.06.30 1-14	JEF United Ichihara	0-2	Kashima Antlers	Tochigi Green Stadium
			Kurosaki 29'; Ishii 52'	Attendance: 17,990

1993.07.03 1-15	Yokohama Flügels	0-0 (aet, PK 1-3)	Verdy Kawasaki	Nagasaki Athletic Stadium
				Attendance: 14,552

1993.07.03 1-15	Shimizu S-Pulse	4-1	JEF United Ichihara	Nihondaira Sports Stadium
	Hasegawa 12', 89'; Mukojima 18'; Oenoki 69'		Makino 74'	Attendance: 9,290

1993.07.03 1-15	Nagoya Grampus Eight	2-3	Gamba Osaka	Suzuka Sports Garden
	Goto 64'; Pita 71'		Müller 51', 85'; Nagashima 87'	Attendance: 12,167

1993.07.03 1-15	Urawa Red Diamonds	1-0	Sanfrecce Hiroshima	Urawa Komaba Stadium
	Matsumoto 59'			Attendance: 9,013

1993.07.03 1-15	Kashima Antlers	3-1	Yokohama Marinos	Kashima Soccer Stadium
	Kurosaki 18'; Alcindo 34', 77'		Jinno 79'	Attendance: 14,976

1993.07.07 1-16	JEF United Ichihara	1-0 (aet, GG)	Yokohama Flügels	Ichihara Seaside Stadium
	Řehák 112'			Attendance: 8,941

1993.07.07 1-16	Urawa Red Diamonds	0-2	Kashima Antlers	Urawa Komaba Stadium
			Ishii 9'; Kurosaki 55'	Attendance: 9,325

1993.07.07 1-16	Verdy Kawasaki	5-0	Nagoya Grampus Eight	Todoroki Athletics Stadium
	Kitazawa 6', 13'; Nagai 19'; Hanssen 71'; Miura 83'			Attendance: 10,225

1993.07.07 1-16	Yokohama Marinos	3-1	Shimizu S-Pulse	Yokohama Mitsuzawa Stadium
	Bisconti 31'; Díaz 60', 79'		Hasegawa 66'	Attendance: 12,199

1993.07.07 1-16	Sanfrecce Hiroshima	4-3 (aet, GG)	Gamba Osaka	Hiroshima Stadium
	Kazama 19'; Černý 46'; Matsuda 70'; Takagi 91'		Matsunami 23'; Müller 43', 59'	Attendance: 12,731

1993.07.10 1-17	Shimizu S-Pulse	0-0 (aet, PK 6-5)	Urawa Red Diamonds	Nihondaira Sports Stadium
				Attendance: 9,448

1993.07.10 1-17	Kashima Antlers	1-2 (aet, GG)	Sanfrecce Hiroshima	Kashima Soccer Stadium
	Hasegawa 71'		Černý 58'; Takagi 99'	Attendance: 15,055

1993.07.10 1-17	Yokohama Flügels	1-0	Yokohama Marinos	Yokohama Mitsuzawa Stadium
	Maezono 47'			Attendance: 13,943

1993.07.10 1-17	Nagoya Grampus Eight	0-1	JEF United Ichihara	Gifu Nagaragawa Stadium
			Littbarski 89'	Attendance: 26,370

1993.07.10 1-17	Gamba Osaka	2-3	Verdy Kawasaki	Osaka Expo '70 Stadium
	Nagashima 29'; Müller 71'		Takeda 16'; Kitazawa 40'; Hashiratani 85'	Attendance: 21,447

1993.07.14 1-18	JEF United Ichihara	0-1	Gamba Osaka	Ichihara Seaside Stadium
			Azuma 22'	Attendance: 9,113

1993.07.14 1-18	Kashima Antlers	1-2	Shimizu S-Pulse	Kashima Soccer Stadium
	Hasegawa 68'		Edu 61'; Tajima 84'	Attendance: 14,673

1993.07.14 1-18	Urawa Red Diamonds	0-2	Yokohama Flügels	Urawa Komaba Stadium
			Watanabe 17'; Iwai 30'	Attendance: 8,905

1993.07.14 1-18	Verdy Kawasaki	2-0	Sanfrecce Hiroshima	Todoroki Athletics Stadium
	Takeda 35'; Hanssen 66'			Attendance: 10,100

1993.07.14 1-18	Yokohama Marinos	1-0	Nagoya Grampus Eight	Yokohama Mitsuzawa Stadium
	Koizumi 14'			Attendance: 12,280

1993.07.24 2-1	Gamba Osaka	0-1 (aet, GG)	Kashima Antlers	Osaka Expo '70 Stadium
			Santos 107'	Attendance: 22,677

1993.07.24 2-1	Sanfrecce Hiroshima	4-0	Urawa Red Diamonds	Hiroshima Stadium
	Kazama 17', 73'; Noh Jung-yoon 36'; Kenichi Uemura 40'			Attendance: 13,067

1993.07.24 2-1	Nagoya Grampus Eight	1-2	Yokohama Flügels	Kobe Universiade Memorial Stadium
	Jorginho 29'		Maeda 8'; Edu 44'	Attendance: 38,757

1993.07.24 2-1	Yokohama Marinos	3-0	Verdy Kawasaki	Yokohama Mitsuzawa Stadium
	Bisconti 4'; Díaz 43', 72' (pen.)			Attendance: 14,248

1993.07.24 2-1	JEF United Ichihara	1-0	Shimizu S-Pulse	Ichihara Seaside Stadium
	Echigo 76'			Attendance: 9,358

1993.07.31 2-2	Kashima Antlers	1-1 (aet, PK 5-3)	Nagoya Grampus Eight	Kashima Soccer Stadium
	Santos 34'		Goto 24'	Attendance: 14,747

1993.07.31 2-2	Yokohama Flügels	2-3	JEF United Ichihara	Yokohama Mitsuzawa Stadium
	Takada 35'; Tomishima 88'		Echigo 22'; Goto 23'; Littbarski 61'	Attendance: 12,425

1993.07.31 2-2	Verdy Kawasaki	2-0	Gamba Osaka	Hakatanomori Athletic Stadium
	Takeda 53'; Miura 80'			Attendance: 27,674

1993.07.31 2-2	Urawa Red Diamonds	0-0 (aet, PK 4-2)	Yokohama Marinos	Urawa Komaba Stadium
				Attendance: 9,375

1993.07.31 2-2	Shimizu S-Pulse	2-1 (aet, GG)	Sanfrecce Hiroshima	Nihondaira Sports Stadium
	Mukojima 80'; Hasegawa 92'		Vonderburg 9'	Attendance: 8,991

1993.08.04 2-3	Sanfrecce Hiroshima	3-0	Yokohama Flügels	Hiroshima Stadium
	Tanaka 47'; Noh Jung-yoon 58'; Černý 89'			Attendance: 12,758

1993.08.04 2-3	Gamba Osaka	0-1	Urawa Red Diamonds	Osaka Expo '70 Stadium
			Hashiratani 3'	Attendance: 20,259

1993.08.04 2-3	Yokohama Marinos	0-4	Shimizu S-Pulse	Yokohama Mitsuzawa Stadium
			Edu 35', 85'; Sawanobori 44'; Mukojima 46'	Attendance: 13,146

1993.08.04 2-3	Verdy Kawasaki	2-1	Kashima Antlers	Todoroki Athletics Stadium
	Miura 51'; Ramos 82'		Alcindo 39'	Attendance: 10,150

1993.08.04 2-3	JEF United Ichihara	5-2	Nagoya Grampus Eight	Ichihara Seaside Stadium
	Goto 20'; Řehák 28' (pen.), 83'; Ordenewitz 42', 75'		Asano 8'; Okayama 68'	Attendance: 10,551

1993.08.07 2-4	Yokohama Flügels	0-1 (aet, GG)	Shimizu S-Pulse	Suizenji Stadium
			Tajima 112'	Attendance: 13,133

1993.08.07 2-4	Nagoya Grampus Eight	4-1	Urawa Red Diamonds	Suzuka Sports Garden
	Tsuruta 29'; Shimamura 48'; Hirano 56'; Garça 89'		Uehara 1'	Attendance: 11,858

1993.08.07 2-4	Yokohama Marinos	1-1 (aet, PK 8-7)	Kashima Antlers	Yokohama Mitsuzawa Stadium
	Miura 59'		Zico 30'	Attendance: 14,152

1993.08.07 2-4	Verdy Kawasaki	2-1	JEF United Ichihara	Sapporo Atsubetsu Park Stadium
	Miura 78'; Bismarck 89'		Littbarski 36'	Attendance: 21,745

1993.08.08 2-4	Sanfrecce Hiroshima	0-2	Gamba Osaka	Hiroshima Big Arch
			Nagashima 49'; Kudaka 75'	Attendance: 34,872

1993.08.14 2-5	Verdy Kawasaki	3-0	Sanfrecce Hiroshima	Todoroki Athletics Stadium
	Ramos 1'; Miura 41'; Takeda 63'			Attendance: 10,195

1993.08.14 2-5	Nagoya Grampus Eight	0-1 (aet, GG)	Shimizu S-Pulse	Gifu Nagaragawa Stadium
			Tajima 94'	Attendance: 25,301

1993.08.14 2-5	Kashima Antlers	1-2	Yokohama Flügels	Kashima Soccer Stadium
	Manaka 73'		Maeda 30'; Yamaguchi 48'	Attendance: 14,035

1993.08.14 2-5	Urawa Red Diamonds	2-3	JEF United Ichihara	Urawa Komaba Stadium
	Mochizuki 34'; Hashiratani 47'		Ordenewitz 4', 16'; Řehák 84'	Attendance: 9,366

1993.08.14 2-5	Gamba Osaka	2-1	Yokohama Marinos	Osaka Expo '70 Stadium
	Metkov 2', 68'		Bisconti 31'	Attendance: 21,509

1993.08.19 2-6	Verdy Kawasaki	3-1	Nagoya Grampus Eight	Tokyo National Stadium
	Miura 67' (pen.); 72' (o.g.); Nakamura 89'		Ogawa 5'	Attendance: 54,977

1993.08.20 2-6	Kashima Antlers	0-1	Shimizu S-Pulse	Kashima Soccer Stadium
			Mukojima 32'	Attendance: 13,938

1993.08.20 2-6	Gamba Osaka	2-0	JEF United Ichihara	Osaka Expo '70 Stadium
	Matsuyama 79'; Isogai 89'			Attendance: 20,438

1993.08.20 2-6	Yokohama Marinos	1-2 (aet, GG)	Sanfrecce Hiroshima	Yokohama Mitsuzawa Stadium
	Díaz 40'		Matsuda 33'; Takagi 102'	Attendance: 14,102

1993.08.20 2-6	Urawa Red Diamonds	0-1	Yokohama Flügels	Urawa Komaba Stadium
			Maeda 14'	Attendance: 9,267

1993.08.25 2-7	Kashima Antlers	4-3 (aet, GG)	Sanfrecce Hiroshima	Kashima Soccer Stadium
	Zico 33'; Kurosaki 47', 49'; Yoshida 115'		Takagi 5', 43'; Katanosaka 89'	Attendance: 13,923

1993.08.25 2-7	Shimizu S-Pulse	3-0	Urawa Red Diamonds	Nihondaira Sports Stadium
	Sawanobori 53'; Edu 67', 69'			Attendance: 8,699

1993.08.25 2-7	Yokohama Flügels	0-1	Verdy Kawasaki	Tokyo National Stadium
			Miura 44'	Attendance: 51,082

1993.08.25 2-7	Nagoya Grampus Eight	0-2	Gamba Osaka	Hakatanomori Athletic Stadium
			Wada 39'; Matsuyama 77'	Attendance: 27,356

1993.08.25 2-7	JEF United Ichihara	2-2 (aet, PK 2-4)	Yokohama Marinos	Tochigi Green Stadium
	Řehák 69'; Echigo 71'		Díaz 21', 51'	Attendance: 17,226

1993.08.28 2-8	Gamba Osaka	0-0 (aet, PK 4-5)	Yokohama Flügels	Osaka Expo '70 Stadium
				Attendance: 21,330

1993.08.28 2-8	Kashima Antlers	2-0	Urawa Red Diamonds	Kashima Soccer Stadium
	Yoshida 38'; Santos 66'			Attendance: 14,353

1993.08.28 2-8	JEF United Ichihara	1-3	Sanfrecce Hiroshima	Ichihara Seaside Stadium
	Řehák 18'		Černý 2'; Kojima 50'; Takagi 68'	Attendance: 10,515

1993.08.28 2-8	Yokohama Marinos	2-0	Nagoya Grampus Eight	Yokohama Mitsuzawa Stadium
	Jinno 13'; Bisconti 47'			Attendance: 14,450

1993.08.28 2-8	Verdy Kawasaki	0-0 (aet, PK 2-3)	Shimizu S-Pulse	Iwate Athletic Stadium
				Attendance: 28,625

1993.09.03 2-9	Shimizu S-Pulse	3-2	Gamba Osaka	Nihondaira Sports Stadium
	Sawanobori 43', 49'; Mukojima 89'		Isogai 53'; Flávio 61'	Attendance: 9,005

1993.09.03 2-9	Yokohama Flügels	3-2	Yokohama Marinos	Yokohama Mitsuzawa Stadium
	Yamaguchi 3', 86'; 70' (o.g.)		Díaz 35', 69'	Attendance: 13,257

1993.09.03 2-9	Nagoya Grampus Eight	1-0	Sanfrecce Hiroshima	Paloma Mizuho Rugby Stadium
	Yonekura 50'			Attendance: 11,016

1993.09.03 2-9	Urawa Red Diamonds	0-6	Verdy Kawasaki	Urawa Komaba Stadium
			Bismarck 7'; Ramos 38'; Miura 44'; Takeda 56', 88'; Y. Kato 79'	Attendance: 9,771

1993.09.03 2-9	JEF United Ichihara	1-2 (aet, GG)	Kashima Antlers	Ichihara Seaside Stadium
	Řehák 52'		Hasegawa 84'; Zico 94'	Attendance: 10,467

1993.11.06 2-10	Gamba Osaka	0-4	Verdy Kawasaki	Kobe Universiade Memorial Stadium
			Takeda 44', 76', 79'; Kitazawa 67'	Attendance: 41,054

1993.11.06 2-10	JEF United Ichihara	1-2 (aet, GG)	Yokohama Flügels	Tokyo National Stadium
	Řehák 33'		Maeda 80'; Edu 117'	Attendance: 45,748

1993.11.06 2-10	Yokohama Marinos	3-2 (aet, GG)	Urawa Red Diamonds	Yokohama Mitsuzawa Stadium
	Miura 48'; Díaz 73' (pen.); Everton 97'		F. Ikeda 23'; Hirose 85'	Attendance: 14,207

1993.11.06 2-10	Sanfrecce Hiroshima	0-0 (aet, PK 4-5)	Shimizu S-Pulse	Bingo Athletic Stadium
				Attendance: 10,199

1993.11.06 2-10	Nagoya Grampus Eight	2-1	Kashima Antlers	Paloma Mizuho Rugby Stadium
	Sawairi 7'; Jorginho 61'		Manaka 77'	Attendance: 11,584

1993.11.10 2-11	Kashima Antlers	3-4 (aet, GG)	Gamba Osaka	Kashima Soccer Stadium
	53' (o.g.); Alcindo 73'; Hasegawa 89'		Nagashima 10'; Isogai 59'; Matsunami 89'; Minobe 117'	Attendance: 13,417

1993.11.10 2-11	Shimizu S-Pulse	1-1 (aet, PK 3-4)	JEF United Ichihara	Kusanagi Athletic Stadium
	Hasegawa 25'		Nakanishi 50'	Attendance: 17,540

1993.11.10 2-11	Yokohama Flügels	1-0	Nagoya Grampus Eight	Nagasaki Athletic Stadium
	Maezono 83'			Attendance: 13,205

1993.11.10 2-11	Verdy Kawasaki	1-0 (aet, GG)	Yokohama Marinos	Tokyo National Stadium
	Takeda 91'			Attendance: 55,243

1993.11.10 2-11	Urawa Red Diamonds	1-2	Sanfrecce Hiroshima	Urawa Komaba Stadium
	Hirose 33'		Noh Jung-yoon 11'; Černý 23'	Attendance: 8,258

1993.11.13 2-12	Kashima Antlers	3-2	Yokohama Marinos	Kashima Soccer Stadium
	Alcindo 21', 69'; Zico 77'		Díaz 0', 19'	Attendance: 14,235

1993.11.13 2-12	Urawa Red Diamonds	0-5	Nagoya Grampus Eight	Urawa Komaba Stadium
			Jorginho 3', 62'; Elivélton 28'; Garça 40' (pen.), 44'	Attendance: 9,347

1993.11.13 2-12	Shimizu S-Pulse	3-1	Yokohama Flügels	Kusanagi Athletic Stadium
	Mukojima 31', 69'; Miura 79'		Amarilla 44'	Attendance: 16,080

1993.11.13 2-12	Gamba Osaka	3-6	Sanfrecce Hiroshima	Osaka Expo '70 Stadium
	Nagashima 27'; Minobe 33'; Isogai 58'		Takagi 25', 60'; Černý 43'; Noh Jung-yoon 67'; Jönsson 75'; Moriyama 85'	Attendance: 19,290

1993.11.13 2-12	JEF United Ichihara	1-4	Verdy Kawasaki	Miyagi Athletic Stadium
	Littbarski 23'		Bismarck 50', 59'; Pereira 75'; Nakamura 86'	Attendance: 19,524

1993.11.17 2-13	Shimizu S-Pulse	2-0	Nagoya Grampus Eight	Kusanagi Athletic Stadium
	Edu 29'; Hasegawa 34'			Attendance: 16,889

1993.11.17 2-13	Yokohama Flügels	2-3 (aet, GG)	Kashima Antlers	Suizenji Stadium
	Amarilla 48'; Edu 87' (pen.)		Zico 39'; Alcindo 75' (pen.); Manaka 114'	Attendance: 14,186

1993.11.17 2-13	JEF United Ichihara	2-3 (aet, GG)	Urawa Red Diamonds	Tokyo National Stadium
	Nakanishi 25'; Ordenewitz 75' (pen.)		Fukuda 69'; Rahn 86' (pen.); Mizuuchi 107'	Attendance: 53,570

1993.11.17 2-13	Yokohama Marinos	4-0	Gamba Osaka	Yokohama Mitsuzawa Stadium
	Everton 7'; Díaz 56', 83'; Mizunuma 70'			Attendance: 13,589

1993.11.17 2-13	Sanfrecce Hiroshima	1-3	Verdy Kawasaki	Hiroshima Stadium
	Katanosaka 61'		Miura 24', 29'; Takeda 89'	Attendance: 13,906

1993.11.20 2-14	Shimizu S-Pulse	0-2	Kashima Antlers	Nihondaira Sports Stadium
			Kurosaki 47', 80'	Attendance: 9,231

1993.11.20 2-14	Nagoya Grampus Eight	1-2	Verdy Kawasaki	Gifu Nagaragawa Stadium
	Jorginho 35'		Bismarck 63'; Miura 85'	Attendance: 26,584

1993.11.20 2-14	JEF United Ichihara	3-4 (aet, GG)	Gamba Osaka	Ichihara Seaside Stadium
	Ordenewitz 26', 86'; Řehák 45'		Isogai 44'; Matsunami 65', 78' 94'	Attendance: 10,395

1993.11.20 2-14	Yokohama Flügels	2-1	Urawa Red Diamonds	Kagoshima Kamoike Stadium
	Amarilla 17'; Edu 73' (pen.)		Mizuuchi 14'	Attendance: 15,121

1993.11.21 2-14	Sanfrecce Hiroshima	1-2	Yokohama Marinos	Oita Athletic Stadium
	Shima 21'		Miura 55'; Mizunuma 67'	Attendance: 14,640

1993.11.27 2-15	Verdy Kawasaki	3-0	Yokohama Flügels	Todoroki Athletics Stadium
	Ramos 54'; Miura 74' (pen.); Bismarck 85'			Attendance: 10,299

1993.11.27 2-15	Yokohama Marinos	2-0	JEF United Ichihara	Hakatanomori Athletic Stadium
	Koizumi 28'; Yamada 47'			Attendance: 27,495

1993.11.27 2-15	Gamba Osaka	2-2 (aet, PK 6-5)	Nagoya Grampus Eight	Nishikyogoku Athletic Stadium
	Ishii 68'; Matsuyama 86'		Moriyama 18'; Goto 83'	Attendance: 13,069

1993.11.27 2-15	Urawa Red Diamonds	0-2	Shimizu S-Pulse	Tokyo National Stadium
			Sawanobori 22'; Edu 42'	Attendance: 50,348

1993.11.27 2-15	Sanfrecce Hiroshima	0-1	Kashima Antlers	Hiroshima Big Arch
			Zico 22'	Attendance: 29,091

1993.12.01 2-16	Sanfrecce Hiroshima	2-0	JEF United Ichihara	Hiroshima Stadium
	Shima 47', 66'			Attendance: 10,006

1993.12.01 2-16	Yokohama Flügels	0-1	Gamba Osaka	Nagasaki Athletic Stadium
			Yamaguchi 54'	Attendance: 14,374

1993.12.01 2-16	Nagoya Grampus Eight	1-2	Yokohama Marinos	Mizuho Rugby Stadium
	Jorginho 15'		Díaz 30'; Mizunuma 56'	Attendance: 11,446

1993.12.01 2-16	Shimizu S-Pulse	0-1	Verdy Kawasaki	Tokyo National Stadium
			Takeda 26'	Attendance: 51,825

1993.12.01 2-16	Urawa Red Diamonds	2-1 (aet, GG)	Kashima Antlers	Urawa Komaba Stadium
	Rummenigge 4'; Motoyoshi 104'		Santos 43'	Attendance: 9,256

1993.12.08 2-17	Sanfrecce Hiroshima	1-0 (aet, GG)	Nagoya Grampus Eight	Hiroshima Stadium
	Černý 106'			Attendance: 9,672

1993.12.08 2-17	Gamba Osaka	0-2	Shimizu S-Pulse	Osaka Expo '70 Stadium
			Iwashita 28'; Hasegawa 34'	Attendance: 21,207

1993.12.08 2-17	Yokohama Marinos	4-1	Yokohama Flügels	Yokohama Mitsuzawa Stadium
	Díaz 11', 56', 79'; Everton 43'		Aldro 78'	Attendance: 13,024

1993.12.08 2-17	Verdy Kawasaki	4-0	Urawa Red Diamonds	Tokyo National Stadium
	Miura 17', 27', 82'; Fujiyoshi 79'			Attendance: 50,310

1993.12.08 2-17	Kashima Antlers	3-0	JEF United Ichihara	Kashima Soccer Stadium
	Alcindo 4', 81'; Ono 27'			Attendance: 13,282

1993.12.15 2-18	Kashima Antlers	1-2	Verdy Kawasaki	Kashima Soccer Stadium
	Alcindo 23'		Ishikawa 27'; Miura 68'	Attendance: 15,277

1993.12.15 2-18	Nagoya Grampus Eight	6-0	JEF United Ichihara	Paloma Mizuho Rugby Stadium
	Moriyama 22'; Mori 33'; Hirano 41', 58'; Jorginho 52'; Elivélton 83'			Attendance: 11,173

1993.12.15 2-18	Shimizu S-Pulse	1-0	Yokohama Marinos	Tokyo National Stadium
	Oenoki 55'			Attendance: 48,937

1993.12.15 2-18	Urawa Red Diamonds	2-0	Gamba Osaka	Urawa Komaba Stadium
	Mizuuchi 39', 64'			Attendance: 8,940

1993.12.15 2-18	Yokohama Flügels	1-2	Sanfrecce Hiroshima	Yokohama Mitsuzawa Stadium
	Moner 89'		Černý 54'; Shima 71'	Attendance: 12,730

== Standings ==
=== Suntory Series (1st Stage) Standings ===
Pos	Team	Pld	W	L	GF	GA	GD	Qualification
1	(Ibaraki Prefecture) Kashima Antlers	18	13	5	41	18	+23	1993 Suntory Series Champions; Qualifies to Suntory Championship '93
2	(Tokyo) Verdy Kawasaki	18	12	6	29	21	+8	
3	(Kanagawa Prefecture) Yokohama Marinos	18	11	7	29	24	+5	
4	(Shizuoka Prefecture) Shimizu S-Pulse	18	10	8	28	25	+3	
5	(Chiba Prefecture) JEF United Ichihara	18	9	9	26	23	+3	
6	(Hiroshima Prefecture) Sanfrecce Hiroshima	18	9	9	23	24	−1	
7	(Kanagawa Prefecture) Yokohama Flügels	18	8	10	24	21	+3	
8	(Osaka Prefecture) Gamba Osaka	18	8	10	27	31	−4	
9	(Aichi Prefecture) Nagoya Grampus Eight	18	7	11	21	38	−17	
10	(Saitama Prefecture) Urawa Red Diamonds	18	3	15	11	34	−23	

Source: J.League official data site

=== NICOS Series (2nd stage) Standings ===
Pos	Team	Pld	W	L	GF	GA	GD	Qualification
1	Verdy Kawasaki	18	16	2	43	10	+33	1993 NICOS Series Champions; Qualifies to Suntory Championship '93
2	Shimizu S-Pulse	18	14	4	26	9	+17	
3	Yokohama Marinos	18	10	8	31	24	+7	
4	Kashima Antlers	18	10	8	31	25	+6	
5	Sanfrecce Hiroshima	18	9	9	31	25	+6	
6	Gamba Osaka	18	8	10	24	34	−10	
7	Yokohama Flügels	18	8	10	20	30	−10	
8	Nagoya Grampus Eight	18	5	13	27	28	−1	
9	JEF United Ichihara	18	5	13	25	44	−19	
10	Urawa Red Diamonds	18	5	13	15	44	−29	

Source: / J. League official data site

=== Suntory Championship '93 ===
January 9, 1994
13:05

Kashima Antlers	0 – 2	Verdy Kawasaki
		Miura 60'; Bismarck 89'

Tokyo National Stadium, Tokyo
Attendance: 53,553
Referee: Kenji Tanaka

January 16, 1994
13:03

Verdy Kawasaki	1 – 1	Kashima Antlers
Miura 82'		Alcindo 38'

Tokyo National Stadium, Tokyo
Attendance: 59,715
Referee: Shizuo Takada

Verdy Kawasaki won the series on 3-1 aggregate.

=== Overall standings ===
Pos	Team	Pld	W	L	GF	GA	GD	Qualification
1	Verdy Kawasaki	36	28	8	69	28	+41	1993 J.League Champions; Qualifies to 1994/95 ACC, 1994 Super Cup, and 1994 Sanwa Bank Cup
2	Kashima Antlers	36	23	13	72	43	+29	
3	Shimizu S-Pulse	36	24	12	54	34	+20	
4	Yokohama Marinos	36	21	15	60	48	+12	
5	Sanfrecce Hiroshima	36	18	18	54	49	+5	
6	Yokohama Flügels	36	16	20	44	51	−7	
7	Gamba Osaka	36	16	20	51	65	−14	
8	JEF United Ichihara	36	14	22	51	67	−16	
9	Nagoya Grampus Eight	36	12	24	48	66	−18	
10	Urawa Red Diamonds	36	8	28	26	78	−52	

== Honours ==
Competition	Champion	Runners-up	3rd place
Domestic league
J.League Suntory Series	Kashima Antlers	Verdy Kawasaki	Yokohama Marinos
J.League NICOS Series	Verdy Kawasaki	Shimizu S-Pulse	Yokohama Marinos
Suntory Championship	Verdy Kawasaki	Kashima Antlers	n/a
Cup competitions
Emperor's Cup	Yokohama Flügels	Kashima Antlers	Shimizu S-Pulse; Sanfrecce Hiroshima
Nabisco Cup	Verdy Kawasaki	Shimizu S-Pulse	Yokohama Flügels; Gamba Osaka
XEROX Super Cup	Not held		

== Average attendance ==
In its first year, the league averaged 17,976 fans and had over 3.2 million fans total over the course of the season. The following chart shows the league ranked in terms of average attendance:

Team name	Total attendance	Average attendance
Verdy Kawasaki	454,237	25,235
Gamba Osaka	388,286	21,571
JEF United Ichihara	364,922	20,273
Nagoya Grampus Eight	357,451	19,858
Shimizu S-Pulse	332,312	18,462
Yokohama Marinos	302,054	16,781
Sanfrecce Hiroshima	299,586	16,644
Yokohama Flügels	278,346	15,464
Kashima Antlers	252,291	14,016
Urawa Red Diamonds	206,265	11,459
Total	3,235,750	17,976

== Top scorers ==
Rank	Scorer	Club	Goals
1	(Argentina) Ramón Díaz	Yokohama Marinos	28
2	(Brazil) Alcindo	Kashima Antlers	22
3	(Japan) Kazuyoshi Miura	Verdy Kawasaki	20
4	(Japan) Nobuhiro Takeda	Verdy Kawasaki	17
5	(Czech Republic) Pavel Řehák	JEF United Ichihara	16
6	(Brazil) Edu Manga	Shimizu S-Pulse	13
7	(Japan) Akihiro Nagashima	Gamba Osaka	12

== Awards ==
MVP

(Japan) Kazuyoshi Miura - (Verdy Kawasaki)

Rookie of the Year

(Japan) Masaaki Sawanobori - (Shimizu S-Pulse)

Manager of the Year

(Japan) Yasutaro Matsuki - (Verdy Kawasaki)

Top Scorer

(Argentina) Ramón Díaz - (Yokohama Marinos)

Best XI

Position	Player	Team
GK	(Japan) Shigetatsu Matsunaga	Yokohama Marinos
DF	(Brazil) Pereira	Verdy Kawasaki
DF	(Japan) Tetsuji Hashiratani	Verdy Kawasaki
DF	(Japan) Takumi Horiike	Shimizu S-Pulse
DF	(Japan) Masami Ihara	Yokohama Marinos
DF	(Japan) Shunzo Ono	Kashima Antlers
MF	(Brazil) Santos	Kashima Antlers
MF	(Japan) Yasuto Honda	Kashima Antlers
MF	(Japan) Ruy Ramos	Verdy Kawasaki
FW	(Argentina) Ramón Díaz	Yokohama Marinos
FW	(Japan) Kazuyoshi Miura	Verdy Kawasaki
