= 1990 Emperor's Cup final =

1990 Emperor's Cup Final
| Matsushita Electric | Nissan Motors |
| 0 | 0 |
- Date: January 1, 1991
- Venue: National Stadium, Tokyo

1990 Emperor's Cup Final was the 70th final of the Emperor's Cup competition. The final was played at National Stadium in Tokyo on January 1, 1991. Matsushita Electric won the championship.

== Overview ==
Matsushita Electric won their 1st title, by defeating defending champion Nissan Motors on a penalty shoot-out.

== Match details ==
January 1, 1991

| Nissan Motors | 0–0 | Matsushita Electric |
Penalties
| | 4–3 |

National Stadium
Referee: Shizuo Takada

Nissan Motors
| GK | (Japan) Shigetatsu Matsunaga |
| DF | (Japan) Kunio Nagayama |
| DF | (Japan) Makoto Sugiyama |
| DF | (Japan) Junji Koizumi |
| DF | (Japan) Masaharu Suzuki |
| DF | (Japan) Tetsuji Hashiratani |
| MF | (Japan) Masami Ihara |
| MF | (Japan) Kazushi Kimura (substituted off) |
| MF | (Brazil) Everton |
| MF | (Brazil) Renato |
| FW | (Japan) Takashi Mizunuma |
Substitutes:
| | (Japan) Kokichi Kimura | Substituted on |
| | (Japan) Koichi Hashiratani | Substituted on |
Manager:
(Brazil) Oscar

Matsushima Electric
| GK | (Japan) Yuji Keigoshi |
| DF | (Japan) Takahiro Shimada |
| DF | (Uruguay) Darío Pereyra |
| DF | (Japan) Naohiko Minobe |
| DF | (Japan) Masahiro Wada | Substituted off |
| MF | (Japan) Hiroki Azuma |
| MF | (Japan) Tomoo Kudaka |
| MF | (Japan) Katsushi Kajii |
| MF | (Japan) Naoki Hirano | Substituted off |
| FW | (Brazil) Luís Müller |
| FW | (Japan) Akihiro Nagashima |
Substitutes:
| | (Japan) Kazuaki Koezuka | Substituted on |
| | (Japan) Hirokazu Sasaki | Substituted on |
Manager:
(Japan) Yoji Mizuguchi

== See also ==
- 1990 Emperor's Cup
