= 1993 Bulgarian Cup final =

- Event: 1992–93 Bulgarian Cup
CSKA Sofia	Botev Plovdiv
A Group	A Group
1	0
- Date: 2 June 1993
- Venue: Hristo Botev Stadium, Blagoevgrad
- Referee: Dimo Momirov (Varna)
- Attendance: 18,000

The 1993 Bulgarian Cup final was played at the Hristo Botev Stadium in Blagoevgrad on 2 June 1993, and was contested between the sides of CSKA Sofia and Botev Plovdiv. The match was won by CSKA Sofia.

== Match ==
=== Details ===
2 June 1993
18:00 EEST

CSKA Sofia	1–0	Botev Plovdiv
Metkov 10'

Hristo Botev Stadium, Blagoevgrad
Attendance: 18,000
Referee: Dimo Momirov (Varna)

CSKA	Botev

CSKA:
GK	1	(Bulgaria) Rumen Nenov
DF	2	(Bulgaria) Zarko Machev
DF	3	(Bulgaria) Rosen Kirilov
DF	4	(Bulgaria) Milen Radukanov
DF	5	(North Macedonia) Boban Babunski
MF	6	(Bulgaria) Ivaylo Kirov (c)
MF	7	(Bulgaria) Anatoli Nankov (substituted off) 79'
FW	8	(Bulgaria) Bozhidar Iskrenov (substituted off) 14'
FW	9	(Bulgaria) Ivaylo Andonov
MF	10	(Bulgaria) Hristo Koilov
MF	11	(Bulgaria) Kiril Metkov
Substitutes:
FW		(Bulgaria) Stefan Draganov (substituted on) 14'
MF		(Bulgaria) Viktorio Pavlov (substituted on) 79'
Manager:
(Bulgaria) Tsvetan Yonchev

Botev:
GK	1	(Bulgaria) Dimitar Popov
DF	2	(Bulgaria) Engibar Engibarov
DF	3	(Bulgaria) Georgi Andonov (substituted off) 78'
DF	4	(Bulgaria) Ivan Kochev
DF	5	(Bulgaria) Zapryan Rakov (c)
MF	6	(Bulgaria) Ivan Dobrevski (substituted off) 78'
MF	7	(Bulgaria) Yasen Petrov
MF	8	(Bulgaria) Todor Zaytsev
FW	9	(Bulgaria) Boris Hvoynev
MF	10	(Bulgaria) Tsvetozar Dermendzhiev
MF	11	(Bulgaria) Geno Dobrevski
Substitutes:
MF		(Bulgaria) Marin Bakalov (substituted on) 78'
FW		(Bulgaria) Rumen Chakarov (substituted on) 78'
Manager:
(Bulgaria) Dinko Dermendzhiev

== See also ==
- 1992–93 A Group
