= 1993 Gamba Osaka season =

Gamba Osaka
1993 season
- Manager: Kunishige Kamamoto
- Stadium: Expo '70 Commemorative Stadium
- J.League: 7th
- Emperor's Cup: 2nd Round
- J.League Cup: Semifinals
- Top goalscorer: League: Akihiro Nagashima (12); All: Akihiro Nagashima (17)
- Highest home attendance: 22,677 (vs Kashima Antlers, 24 July 1993); 41,054 (vs Verdy Kawasaki, 6 November 1993, Kobe Universiade Memorial Stadium)
- Lowest home attendance: 15,993 (vs JEF United Ichihara, 22 May 1993)
- Average home league attendance: 20,500
Home colours	Away colours

1993 Gamba Osaka season

== Review and events ==
=== League results summary ===
Overall								Home						Away					
Pld	W	D	L	GF	GA	GD	Pts	W	D	L	GF	GA	GD	W	D	L	GF	GA	GD
36	16	0	20	51	65	−14	48	7	0	11	23	32	−9	9	0	9	28	33	−5

Source: J.LEAGUE OFFICIAL RECORD & DATA 1994. ISBN 4-09-102309-6.

=== League results by round ===
J.League Suntory series (first stage)
Round	1	2	3	4	5	6	7	8	9	10	11	12	13	14	15	16	17	18
Ground	H	A	H	H	A	A	H	H	A	H	A	A	A	H	A	A	H	A
Result	W	L	L	L	L	W	W	L	L	W	W	L	L	W	W	L	L	W
Position	5	7	9	9	9	9	7	9	9	9	8	9	9	9	7	7	8	8

Source: J.LEAGUE OFFICIAL RECORD & DATA 1994. ISBN 4-09-102309-6.
A = Away; H = Home; W = Win; D = Draw; L = Loss

J.League NICOS series (second stage)
Round	1	2	3	4	5	6	7	8	9	10	11	12	13	14	15	16	17	18
Ground	H	A	H	A	H	H	A	H	A	H	A	H	A	A	H	A	H	A
Result	L	L	L	W	W	W	W	L	L	L	W	L	L	W	W	W	L	L
Position	7	10	10	9	6	5	4	4	6	8	7	8	8	7	6	5	6	6

Source: J.LEAGUE OFFICIAL RECORD & DATA 1994. ISBN 4-09-102309-6.
A = Away; H = Home; W = Win; D = Draw; L = Loss

== Competitions ==
Competitions	Position
J.League	7th / 10 clubs
Emperor's Cup	2nd round
J.League Cup	Semifinals

== Domestic results ==
=== J.League ===
==== Suntory series ====
16 May 1993 1st-1	Gamba Osaka	1–0	Urawa Red Diamonds	Expo '70 Commemorative Stadium
19:04 JST (UTC+09)	Wada 29'	J. League		Attendance: 19,580; Referee: Kenji Tanaka; Assistant referees: Kazuo Kakihana, Yoshitsugu Katayama; Fourth official: Sōichirō Kaneko

19 May 1993 1st-2	Yokohama Marinos	1–0 (a.s.d.e.t.)	Gamba Osaka	Yokohama Mitsuzawa Football Stadium
19:00 JST (UTC+09)	Bisconti 112'	J. League		Attendance: 10,332; Referee: Masayoshi Okada; Assistant referees: Keiichi Sunakawa, Kazuaki Hamaguchi; Fourth official: Tōru Kamikawa

22 May 1993 1st-3	Gamba Osaka	0–3	JEF United Ichihara	Expo '70 Commemorative Stadium
19:01 JST (UTC+09)		J. League	Littbarski 28'; Pavel 39'; Ejiri 89'	Attendance: 15,993; Referee: Hiroyuki Umemoto; Assistant referees: Kazunori Okada, Kazuya Yanagisawa; Fourth official: Kazuo Kakihana

26 May 1993 1st-4	Gamba Osaka	1–1 (a.s.d.e.t.) (6–7 p)	Shimizu S-Pulse	Expo '70 Commemorative Stadium
18:59 JST (UTC+09)	Nagashima 39'	J. League	Edu 67'	Attendance: 16,707; Referee: Martin Bodenham; Assistant referees: Kōetsu Kikuchi, Yasuhiro Hemmi; Fourth official: Tsuyoshi Miyake
	Penalties
	(penalty scored) Müller; (penalty scored) Flavio; (penalty scored) Nagashima; (penalty missed) Kudaka; (penalty scored) Wada; (penalty missed) Kondō; (penalty scored) Uemura; (penalty scored) Matsuyama; (penalty missed) Azuma		(penalty scored) Toninho; (penalty scored) Hasegawa; (penalty scored) Marco Antonio; (penalty missed) Ōenoki; (penalty scored) Sugimoto; (penalty missed) Horiike; (penalty scored) Sawanobori; (penalty scored) Naitō; (penalty scored) Hiraoka

29 May 1993 1st-5	Kashima Antlers	4–0	Gamba Osaka	Kashima Soccer Stadium
16:57 JST (UTC+09)	Santos 17'; Hasegawa 23', 71'; Alcindo 37'	J. League		Attendance: 14,058; Referee: Hideo Kikuchi; Assistant referees: Takashi Kunori, Masato Nogami; Fourth official: Ichirō Inukai

2 June 1993 1st-6	Yokohama Flügels	0–1	Gamba Osaka	Yokohama Mitsuzawa Football Stadium
19:03 JST (UTC+09)		J. League	Nagashima 36'	Attendance: 9,725; Referee: Tatsumi Ōno; Assistant referees: Mitsuru Satō, Keiichi Sunakawa; Fourth official: Senri Takahashi

5 June 1993 1st-7	Gamba Osaka	3–1	Nagoya Grampus Eight	Kobe Universiade Memorial Stadium
18:30 JST (UTC+09)	Nagashima 15', 37', 84'	J. League	Jorginho 9'	Attendance: 38,304; Referee: Shinichirō Obata; Assistant referees: Yoshitsugu Katayama, Toyohide Kanda; Fourth official: Kazuya Yanagisawa

9 June 1993 1st-8	Gamba Osaka	1–1 (a.s.d.e.t.) (3–4 p)	Sanfrecce Hiroshima	Expo '70 Commemorative Stadium
19:00 JST (UTC+09)	Matsunami 31'	J. League	Černý 10'	Attendance: 19,351; Referee: Kenji Tanaka; Assistant referees: Morihisa Yamaguchi, Sōichirō Kaneko; Fourth official: Yoshikazu Hiroshima
	Penalties
	(penalty scored) Müller; (penalty scored) Flavio; (penalty missed) Wada; (penalty scored) Isogai; (penalty missed) Matsunami		(penalty scored) Kazama; (penalty scored) Černý; (penalty scored) Moriyama; (penalty scored) Katanosaka

12 June 1993 1st-9	Verdy Kawasaki	1–0 (a.s.d.e.t.)	Gamba Osaka	Kawasaki Todoroki Stadium
15:02 JST (UTC+09)	Miura 92'	J. League		Attendance: 10,058; Referee: Kiyoshi Ōta; Assistant referees: Noboru Ishiyama, Kimio Izaki; Fourth official: Kazuo Shirato

16 June 1993 1st-10	Gamba Osaka	2–1 (a.s.d.e.t.)	Yokohama Marinos	Expo '70 Commemorative Stadium
18:59 JST (UTC+09)	Kusaki 89' 109'	J. League	Hirakawa 41'	Attendance: 19,247; Referee: Hiroyuki Umemoto; Assistant referees: Morihisa Yamaguchi, Yoshitsugu Katayama; Fourth official: Tsuyoshi Miyake

19 June 1993 1st-11	Urawa Red Diamonds	1–3	Gamba Osaka	Urawa Komaba Stadium
15:31 JST (UTC+09)	Fukuda 84' (pen.)	J. League	Nagashima 22'; Isogai 46'; Matsunami 73'	Attendance: 8,953; Referee: Hideo Kikuchi; Assistant referees: Kimio Izaki, Naotsugu Fuse; Fourth official: Morihiko Yamaji

23 June 1993 1st-12	Shimizu S-Pulse	3–2	Gamba Osaka	Kusanagi Athletic Stadium
19:01 JST (UTC+09)	Edu 23', 84'; Mukōjima 68'	J. League	Flavio 34', 71'	Attendance: 15,703; Referee: Hideo Kikuchi; Assistant referees: Kazunori Okada, Yoshio Sawada; Fourth official: Teruhito Kudō

26 June 1993 1st-13	Gamba Osaka	2–4	Kashima Antlers	Expo '70 Commemorative Stadium
16:59 JST (UTC+09)	Müller 31'; Flavio 48' (pen.)	J. League	Santos 50'; Alcindo 52' (pen.); Hasegawa 63'; Kurosaki 76'	Attendance: 20,318; Referee: Martin Bodenham; Assistant referees: Yoshitsugu Katayama, Kazuo Kakihana; Fourth official: Sōichirō Kaneko

30 June 1993 1st-14	Gamba Osaka	2–1	Yokohama Flügels	Expo '70 Commemorative Stadium
19:00 JST (UTC+09)	Nagashima 14'; Müller 31'	J. League	Angelo 89'	Attendance: 16,506; Referee: Hiroyuki Umemoto; Assistant referees: Yoshitsugu Katayama, Yasuhiro Hemmi; Fourth official: Sōichirō Kaneko

3 July 1993 1st-15	Nagoya Grampus Eight	2–3	Gamba Osaka	Mie Sports Garden
18:30 JST (UTC+09)	Gotō 64'; Pita 71'	J. League	Müller 51', 85'; Nagashima 87'	Attendance: 12,167; Referee: Tetsuya Hamana; Assistant referees: Takeshi Ōkura, Yoshimi Ogawa; Fourth official: Takayoshi Kashino

7 July 1993 1st-16	Sanfrecce Hiroshima	4–3 (a.s.d.e.t.)	Gamba Osaka	Hiroshima Stadium
19:03 JST (UTC+09)	Kazama 19'; Černý 46'; Matsuda 70'; Takagi 90'	J. League	Matsunami 23'; Müller 43', 59'	Attendance: 12,731; Referee: Hiroyuki Umemoto; Assistant referees: Kazunori Okada, Hiroshi Tanabe; Fourth official: Ryōichi Nishida

10 July 1993 1st-17	Gamba Osaka	2–3	Verdy Kawasaki	Expo '70 Commemorative Stadium
16:03 JST (UTC+09)	Nagashima 29'; Müller 71'	J. League	Takeda 16'; Kitazawa 40'; Hashiratani 85'	Attendance: 21,447; Referee: Shinichirō Obata; Assistant referees: Yasuhiro Hemmi, Toyohide Kanda; Fourth official: Tsuyoshi Miyake

14 July 1993 1st-18	JEF United Ichihara	0–1	Gamba Osaka	Ichihara Stadium
19:01 JST (UTC+09)		J. League	Azuma 22'	Attendance: 9,113; Referee: Tetsuya Hamana; Assistant referees: Yū Nakamura, Satoru Ishizawa; Fourth official: Tatsuya Sakata

==== NICOS series ====
24 July 1993 2nd-1	Gamba Osaka	0–1 (a.s.d.e.t.)	Kashima Antlers	Expo '70 Commemorative Stadium
19:00 JST (UTC+09)		J. League	Santos 107'	Attendance: 22,677; Referee: Yōtarō Moritsu; Assistant referees: Morihisa Yamaguchi, Yoshikazu Hiroshima; Fourth official: Kazuo Kakihana

31 July 1993 2nd-2	Verdy Kawasaki	2–0	Gamba Osaka	Hakatanomori Athletic Stadium
19:01 JST (UTC+09)	Takeda 53'; Miura 80'	J. League		Attendance: 27,674; Referee: Kenji Tanaka; Assistant referees: Kazuya Yanagisawa, Hideaki Harada; Fourth official: Masatoshi Shibata

4 August 1993 2nd-3	Gamba Osaka	0–1	Urawa Red Diamonds	Expo '70 Commemorative Stadium
18:59 JST (UTC+09)		J. League	Hashiratani 3'	Attendance: 20,259; Referee: Hiroyuki Umemoto; Assistant referees: Yoshikazu Hiroshima, Sōichirō Kaneko; Fourth official: Tsuyoshi Miyake

8 August 1993 2nd-4	Sanfrecce Hiroshima	0–2	Gamba Osaka	Hiroshima Big Arch
19:03 JST (UTC+09)	Nagashima 49'; Kudaka 75'	J. League		Attendance: 34,872; Referee: Kenji Tanaka; Assistant referees: Kazuo Kakihana, Hiroshi Tanabe; Fourth official: Satoru Yamada

14 August 1993 2nd-5	Gamba Osaka	2–1	Yokohama Marinos	Expo '70 Commemorative Stadium
16:03 JST (UTC+09)	Metkov 2', 68'	J. League	Bisconti 31'	Attendance: 21,509; Referee: Kiyoshi Ōta; Assistant referees: Kazuo Kakihana, Hideaki Harada; Fourth official: Tsuyoshi Miyake

20 August 1993 2nd-6	Gamba Osaka	2–0	JEF United Ichihara	Expo '70 Commemorative Stadium
19:01 JST (UTC+09)	Matsuyama 79'; Isogai 89'	J. League		Attendance: 20,438; Referee: Kenji Tanaka; Assistant referees: Kazuya Yanagisawa, Yoshitsugu Katayama; Fourth official: Kazunori Okada

25 August 1993 2nd-7	Nagoya Grampus Eight	0–2	Gamba Osaka	Hakatanomori Athletic Stadium
19:02 JST (UTC+09)		J. League	Wada 39'; Matsuyama 77'	Attendance: 27,356; Referee: Kiichirō Tachi; Assistant referees: Masato Nogami, Hideaki Harada; Fourth official: Hiroyuki Izumi

28 August 1993 2nd-8	Gamba Osaka	0–0 (a.s.d.e.t.) (4–5 p)	Yokohama Flügels	Expo '70 Commemorative Stadium
19:01 JST (UTC+09)		J. League		Attendance: 21,330; Referee: Yōtarō Moritsu; Assistant referees: Yoshikazu Hiroshima, Kazuya Yanagisawa; Fourth official: Tsuyoshi Miyake
	Penalties
	(penalty scored) Wada; (penalty scored) Isogai; (penalty scored) Azuma; (penalty scored) Kudaka; (penalty missed) Nagashima		(penalty scored) Maeda; (penalty scored) Moner; (penalty scored) Watanabe; (penalty scored) Maezono; (penalty scored) Iwai

3 September 1993 2nd-9	Shimizu S-Pulse	3–2	Gamba Osaka	Nihondaira Sports Stadium
19:00 JST (UTC+09)	Sawanobori 43', 49'; Mukōjima 89'	J. League	Isogai 53'; Flavio 61'	Attendance: 9,005; Referee: Shizuo Takada; Assistant referees: Kimio Izaki, Yoshimi Ogawa; Fourth official: Takuji Fukazawa

6 November 1993 2nd-10	Gamba Osaka	0–4	Verdy Kawasaki	Kobe Universiade Memorial Stadium
19:03 JST (UTC+09)		J. League	Takeda 44', 76', 79'; Kitazawa 67'	Attendance: 41,054; Referee: Juan Carlos Crespi; Assistant referees: Fumikazu Shioyazono, Sōichirō Kaneko; Fourth official: Kazunori Okada

10 November 1993 2nd-11	Kashima Antlers	3–4 (a.s.d.e.t.)	Gamba Osaka	Kashima Soccer Stadium
19:03 JST (UTC+09)	53' (o.g.); Alcindo 73'; Hasegawa 89'	J. League	Nagashima 10'; Isogai 59'; Matsunami 89'; Minobe 117'	Attendance: 13,417; Referee: Kiichirō Tachi; Assistant referees: Toshiyuki Mayuzumi, Takashi Kunori; Fourth official: Ichirō Inukai

13 November 1993 2nd-12	Gamba Osaka	3–6	Sanfrecce Hiroshima	Expo '70 Commemorative Stadium
15:33 JST (UTC+09)	Nagashima 27'; Minobe 33'; Isogai 58'	J. League	Takagi 25', 60'; Černý 43'; Noh 67'; Jönsson 75'; Moriyama 85'	Attendance: 19,290; Referee: Juan Carlos Crespi; Assistant referees: Kōetsu Kikuchi, Yoshikazu Hiroshima; Fourth official: Tsuyoshi Miyake

17 November 1993 2nd-13	Yokohama Marinos	4–0	Gamba Osaka	Yokohama Mitsuzawa Football Stadium
19:03 JST (UTC+09)	Everton 7'; Díaz 56', 83'; Mizunuma 70'	J. League		Attendance: 13,589; Referee: Masahiro Sogawa; Assistant referees: Keiichi Sunakawa, Noboru Ishiyama; Fourth official: Haruo Suzuki

20 November 1993 2nd-14	JEF United Ichihara	3–4 (a.s.d.e.t.)	Gamba Osaka	Ichihara Stadium
14:59 JST (UTC+09)	Otze 26', 86'; Pavel 45'	J. League	Isogai 44'; Matsunami 65', 78' 94'	Attendance: 10,395; Referee: Kiichirō Tachi; Assistant referees: Hideo Kikuchi, Masahiro Katagiri; Fourth official: Fujirō Masukura

27 November 1993 2nd-15	Gamba Osaka	2–2 (a.s.d.e.t.) (6–5 p)	Nagoya Grampus Eight	Kyoto Nishikyogoku Stadium
15:01 JST (UTC+09)	Ishii 68'; Matsuyama 86'	J. League	Moriyama 18'; Gotō 83'	Attendance: 13,069; Referee: Shinichirō Obata; Assistant referees: Yoshitsugu Katayama, Yoshikazu Hiroshima; Fourth official: Hiroyuki Ishida
	Penalties
	(penalty missed) Isogai; (penalty scored) Matsuyama; (penalty scored) Wada; (penalty scored) Matsunami; (penalty scored) Kondō; (penalty scored) Shimada; (penalty scored) Aleinikov		(penalty scored) Fujikawa; (penalty scored) Jorginho; (penalty scored) Garça; (penalty scored) Elivélton; (penalty missed) Gotō; (penalty scored) Asano; (penalty missed) Egawa

1 December 1993 2nd-16	Yokohama Flügels	0–1	Gamba Osaka	Nagasaki Stadium
19:04 JST (UTC+09)		J. League	Yamaguchi 54'	Attendance: 14,374; Referee: Juan Carlos Crespi; Assistant referees: Kazuya Yanagisawa, Hideaki Harada; Fourth official: Shigehisa Yamaguchi

8 December 1993 2nd-17	Gamba Osaka	0–2	Shimizu S-Pulse	Expo '70 Commemorative Stadium
19:01 JST (UTC+09)		J. League	Iwashita 28'; Hasegawa 34'	Attendance: 21,207; Referee: Yōtarō Moritsu; Assistant referees: Morihisa Yamaguchi, Kazuya Yanagisawa; Fourth official: Sōichirō Kaneko

15 December 1993 2nd-18	Urawa Red Diamonds	2–0	Gamba Osaka	Urawa Komaba Stadium
19:00 JST (UTC+09)	Mizuuchi 39', 64'	J. League		Attendance: 8,940; Referee: Kiyoshi Ōta; Assistant referees: Yū Nakamura, Mitsuru Satō; Fourth official: Izumi Okada

=== Emperor's Cup ===
5 December 1993 1st Round	Kochi University	0–5	Gamba Osaka	Gifu Nagaragawa Stadium
: JST (UTC+09)			Matsunami ?', ?'; Yamaguchi ?', ?'; Aleinikov ?'	Attendance: 25,434

11 December 1993 2nd Round	Nagoya Grampus Eight	3–2	Gamba Osaka	Kyoto Nishikyogoku Stadium
: JST (UTC+09)	Yonekura ?', ?'; Jorginho ?'		Yamaguchi ?'; Matsuyama ?'	Attendance: 13,211

=== J.League Cup ===
11 September 1993 GL-A-1	Kashiwa Reysol	0–1	Gamba Osaka	Kashiwa Hitachi Stadium
18:30 JST (UTC+09)		J. League	Kudaka 76'	Attendance: 14,380; Referee: Hideo Kikuchi; Assistant referees: Kimio Izaki, Naotsugu Fuse; Fourth official: Tetsuya Azuma

15 September 1993 GL-A-2	Gamba Osaka	1–1 (a.s.d.e.t.) (4–2 p)	Shonan Bellmare	Expo '70 Commemorative Stadium
19:02 JST (UTC+09)	Müller 28'	J. League	Betinho 89'	Attendance: 22,016; Referee: Yōtarō Moritsu; Assistant referees: Yasuhiro Hemmi, Toyohide Kanda; Fourth official: Kazuo Kakihana
	Penalties
	(penalty scored) Flavio; (penalty scored) Müller; (penalty scored) Kudaka; (penalty scored) Wada		(penalty scored) Mirandinha; (penalty missed) Noguchi; (penalty scored) Natsuka; (penalty missed) Narahashi

18 September 1993 GL-A-3	Verdy Kawasaki	5–1	Gamba Osaka	Tokyo National Stadium
18:31 JST (UTC+09)	Bismarck 15', 44'; Y. Katō 35'; Fujiyoshi 66'; Nagai 82'	J. League	Kazuaki Koezuka 31'	Attendance: 47,373; Referee: Juan Carlos Crespi; Assistant referees: Hiroshi Fukuda, Noboru Ishiyama; Fourth official: Katsunori Moriya

25 September 1993 GL-A-4	Gamba Osaka	3–4	Kashima Antlers	Kobe Universiade Memorial Stadium
19:02 JST (UTC+09)	44' (o.g.); Aleinikov 50'; Nagashima 82'	J. League	Alcindo 29'; Gaya 35'; Carlos 51'; Hasegawa 57'	Attendance: 40,795; Referee: Hiroyuki Umemoto; Assistant referees: Yoshikazu Hiroshima, Sōichirō Kaneko; Fourth official: Yasuhiro Hemmi

1 October 1993 GL-A-5	JEF United Ichihara	3–4	Gamba Osaka	Ichihara Stadium
19:01 JST (UTC+09)	Pavel 30'; Otze 53'; Nakanishi 85'	J. League	Kusaki 41'; Flavio 44' (pen.); Metkov 50'; Nagashima 82'	Attendance: 9,828; Referee: Tetsuya Hamana; Assistant referees: Hisashi Uemura, Takeshi Ōkura; Fourth official: Terunobu Kakinuma

GL-A-6	bye

16 October 1993 GL-A-7	Gamba Osaka	5–0	Sanfrecce Hiroshima	Kyoto Nishikyogoku Stadium
18:33 JST (UTC+09)	Nagashima 10'; Yamaguchi 20', 63'; Metkov 44'; Matsunami 83'	J. League		Attendance: 13,831; Referee: Juan Carlos Crespi; Assistant referees: Noboru Ishiyama, Yoshikazu Hiroshima; Fourth official: Yoshitsugu Katayama

23 October 1993 Semifinals	Gamba Osaka	2–4	Shimizu S-Pulse	Expo '70 Commemorative Stadium
15:00 JST (UTC+09)	Nagashima 27', 86'	J. League	Tajima 19'; Ōenoki 35', 75'; Edu 70'	Attendance: 20,497; Referee: Masayoshi Okada; Assistant referees: Morihisa Yamaguchi, Hiroyuki Umemoto; Fourth official: Yoshitsugu Katayama

== Player statistics ==
No.	Pos	Nat	Player	Total		J-League		Emperor's Cup		J-League Cup	
No.	Pos	Nat	Player	Apps	Goals	Apps	Goals	Apps	Goals	Apps	Goals
	GK	(Japan) JPN	Kenji Honnami	16	0	16	0	0	0	0	0
	GK	(Japan) JPN	Hayato Okanaka	28	0	20	0	1	0	7	0
	GK	(Japan) JPN	Tōru Kawashima	1	0	0	0	1	0	0	0
	GK	(Japan) JPN	Kiyoshi Fujii	0	0	0	0	0	0	0	0
	DF	(Japan) JPN	Tomoyuki Kajino	30	0	23	0	1	0	6	0
	DF	(China) CHN	Jia Xiuquan	27	0	25	0	0	0	2	0
	DF	(Japan) JPN	Susumu Uemura	7	0	5	0	0	0	2	0
	DF	(Japan) JPN	Takahiro Shimada	13	0	12	0	0	0	1	0
	DF	(Japan) JPN	Naohiko Minobe	17	2	13	2	0	0	4	0
	DF	(Japan) JPN	Tōru Morikawa	2	0	1	0	0	0	1	0
	DF	(Japan) JPN	Hiroki Azuma	14	1	12	1	1	0	1	0
	DF	(Japan) JPN	Yoshihisa Matsushima	0	0	0	0	0	0	0	0
	DF	(Japan) JPN	Sōjirō Ishii	17	1	14	1	2	0	1	0
	DF	(Japan) JPN	Yuji Hashimoto	1	0	1	0	0	0	0	0
	DF	(Japan) JPN	Shōji Nonoshita	6	0	4	0	0	0	2	0
	DF	(Japan) JPN	Tetsuya Ogura	0	0	0	0	0	0	0	0
	DF	(Brazil) BRA	Claudio	0	0	0	0	0	0	0	0
	DF	(Japan) JPN	Kaoru Asano	3	0	3	0	0	0	0	0
	DF	(Japan) JPN	Kazuya Matsuda	0	0	0	0	0	0	0	0
	DF	(Japan) JPN	Takehiro Katō	0	0	0	0	0	0	0	0
	DF	(Japan) JPN	Masao Kiba	0	0	0	0	0	0	0	0
	DF	(Japan) JPN	Kiyotaka Hirai	0	0	0	0	0	0	0	0
	MF	(Brazil) BRA	Müller	20	8	18	7	0	0	2	1
	MF	(Japan) JPN	Katsuhiro Kusaki	16	3	13	2	0	0	3	1
	MF	(Japan) JPN	Tomoo Kudaka	34	2	26	1	2	0	6	1
	MF	(Brazil) BRA	Rinaldo	4	0	4	0	0	0	0	0
	MF	(Japan) JPN	Masahiro Wada	42	2	34	2	2	0	6	0
	MF	(Brazil) BRA	Flavio (Note: His position was DF in Suntory series.)	30	5	23	4	2	0	5	1
	MF	(Japan) JPN	Sachio Nakagoe	0	0	0	0	0	0	0	0
	MF	(Japan) JPN	Kazuaki Koezuka	20	1	15	0	0	0	5	1
	MF	(Japan) JPN	Kunio Kitamura	4	0	3	0	0	0	1	0
	MF	(Japan) JPN	Hiromitsu Isogai	34	6	28	6	2	0	4	0
	MF	(Japan) JPN	Masayuki Mita	0	0	0	0	0	0	0	0
	MF	(Japan) JPN	Yūji Yaso	3	0	3	0	0	0	0	0
	MF	(Japan) JPN	Kōji Kondō	32	0	28	0	2	0	2	0
	MF	(Japan) JPN	Takashi Umezawa	0	0	0	0	0	0	0	0
	MF	(Japan) JPN	Akira Kubota	0	0	0	0	0	0	0	0
	MF	(Japan) JPN	Taizō Komai	0	0	0	0	0	0	0	0
	MF	(Japan) JPN	Shigeru Morioka	1	0	1	0	0	0	0	0
	FW	(Japan) JPN	Akihiro Nagashima	38	17	32	12	0	0	6	5
	FW	(Japan) JPN	Yoshiyuki Matsuyama	24	4	22	3	2	1	0	0
	FW	(Japan) JPN	Yoshiaki Satō	0	0	0	0	0	0	0	0
	FW	(Japan) JPN	Toshihiro Yamaguchi	13	6	6	1	2	3	5	2
	FW	(Japan) JPN	Naoki Hiraoka	0	0	0	0	0	0	0	0
	FW	(Japan) JPN	Hirohito Nakamura	0	0	0	0	0	0	0	0
	FW	(Japan) JPN	Hiroto Yamamura	0	0	0	0	0	0	0	0
	FW	(Japan) JPN	Masanobu Matsunami	34	10	29	7	1	2	4	1
	MF	(Belarus) BLR	Aleinikov †	22	2	15	0	2	1	5	1
	MF	(Bulgaria) BUL	Metkov †	19	4	10	2	2	0	7	2

- † player(s) joined the team after the opening of this season.

== Transfers ==
In:

No.	Pos.	Nation	Player
—	DF	BRA	Flavio (from Vasco da Gama)
—	FW	JPN	Toshihiro Yamaguchi (from Kinki University)
—	GK	JPN	Kiyoshi Fujii (from Tamano Konan High School)
—	DF	JPN	Shōji Nonoshita (from Osaka University of Commerce)
—	DF	JPN	Tetsuya Ogura (from Waseda University)
—	DF	BRA	Claudio Giovanella (from Amparo)
—	DF	JPN	Kazuya Matsuda (from Renaiss Health & Medical College)
—	DF	JPN	Masao Kiba (from Takigawa Daini Senior High School)
—	DF	JPN	Takehiro Kato (from Yamashiro High School)
—	DF	JPN	Kiyotaka Hirai (from Moriyamakita High School)
—	MF	JPN	Yūji Yaso (from Kobe University)
—	FW	JPN	Hiroto Yamamura (from Shizuoka Gakuen Senior High School)
—	FW	JPN	Hirohito Nakamura (from Hokuyo High School)
—	FW	JPN	Masanobu Matsunami (from Teikyo Senior High School)

Out:

No.	Pos.	Nation	Player
—	GK	JPN	Yūji Keigoshi (to Verdy Kawasaki)
—	MF	BRA	Lange
—	MF	JPN	Tetsuya Shiokawa
—	FW	JPN	Katsushi Kajii
—	FW	JPN	Naoki Hirano
—	DF	JPN	Kōji Maeda (to PJM Futures)
—	MF		Kim Sang-Kwan
—	MF	JPN	Yoshihiro Fujita
—	MF	JPN	Keizō Masuhara
—	MF	JPN	Takashi Hazama
—	FW	JPN	Tatsuya Bōno
—		BRA	Edivaldo (died)

== Transfers during the season ==
=== In ===
- (Belarus) Serguei Aleinikov (from Lecce on July)|* (Bulgaria) Kiril Metkov Mihov (from CSKA Sofia on August)

=== Out ===
- (China) Jia Xiuquan (on November)
- (Brazil) Claudio (on November)

== Other pages ==
- (in Japanese) J. League official site
- (in Japanese) Gamba Osaka official site
