= Kudaka =

Kudaka may refer to:

- Kudaka Island, an island in Okinawa
- Tomoo Kudaka, a Japanese football player
