= Hristo Marashliev =

Bulgarian footballer and manager

Personal information
- Full name: Hristo Dimitrov Marashliev
- Date of birth: 14 February 1970 (age 56)
- Place of birth: Sofia, Bulgaria
- Height: 1.85 m (6 ft 1 in)
- Position: Striker

Youth career
- 1978–1989: CSKA Sofia

Senior career*
Years	Team	Apps	(Gls)
1989–1992	CSKA Sofia	35	(14)
1989–1990	→ Sliven (loan)	23	(4)
1992–1993	Académica	16	(2)
1993–1994	CSKA Sofia	18	(3)
1994	Slavia Sofia	13	(5)
1995–1996	CSKA Sofia	18	(1)
1996–1999	Velbazhd Kyustendil	48	(28)
1997	→ Spartak Varna (loan)	17	(15)
1999–2000	Cherno More	28	(21)
2000	Spartak Varna	8	(1)
2001	Marek Dupnitsa	12	(4)
2001–2002	Sliven	–	(–)
2002–2004	Bad Boys Slatina	–	(–)
2005	Velbazhd Kyustendil	–	(–)

Managerial career
- 2005–2008: CSKA Sofia (youth team)
- 2008: Hebar Pazardzhik (assistant)
- 2008–2009: Hebar Pazardzhik
- 2010: Bdin Vidin
- 2010–2015: CSKA Sofia (youth team)
- 2016: CSKA Sofia (youth team)
- 2020: Kom Berkovitsa
- * Club domestic league appearances and goals

Hristo Dimitrov Marashliev (Bulgarian: Христо Димитров Марашлиев; born 14 February 1970) is a former Bulgarian footballer who played as a striker. He is the son of Bulgarian former player and manager Dimitar Marashliev.

== Honours ==
Sliven

- Bulgarian Cup: 1989–90

CSKA Sofia

- Bulgarian League: 1991–92
