= Stefan Draganov =

Bulgarian footballer

Personal information
- Full name: Stefan Angelov Draganov
- Date of birth: 13 August 1966 (age 60)
- Place of birth: Plovdiv, Bulgaria
- Position: Forward

Senior career*
Years	Team	Apps	(Gls)
1983–1991	Lokomotiv Plovdiv	170	(50)
1992–1993	CSKA Sofia	39	(23)
1993–1995	Botev Plovdiv	37	(8)
1995–1996	Lokomotiv Plovdiv	25	(6)
1997–1998	Instant-Dict	34	(16)
1999	Leixões	8	(1)

International career
1988	Bulgaria U21	3	(1)

Managerial career
- 1999–2000: Lokomotiv Plovdiv (scout)
- 2000–2001: Lokomotiv Plovdiv
- 2010: TSC Maryland Red Devils
- * Club domestic league appearances and goals

Stefan Angelov Draganov (Bulgarian: Стефан Ангелов Драганов; born 13 August 1966) is a former Bulgarian footballer who played as a forward. In his career he played for Lokomotiv Plovdiv, CSKA Sofia, Botev Plovdiv, Hong Kong club Instant-Dict and Portuguese Leixões.

== Honours ==
CSKA Sofia

- A Group: 1991–92
- Bulgarian Cup: 1992–93

Instant-Dict

- Hong Kong First Division: 1997–98
