= Kazuaki Koezuka =

Japanese footballer

Kazuaki Koezuka 肥塚 一晃
Personal information
- Full name: Kazuaki Koezuka
- Date of birth: February 10, 1967 (age 59)
- Place of birth: Osaka, Japan
- Height: 1.74 m (5 ft 8 1/2 in)
- Position: Midfielder

Youth career
- 1982–1984: Shimizudani High School
- 1985–1988: Tenri University

Senior career*
Years	Team	Apps	(Gls)
1989–1993	Gamba Osaka	57	(3)
1994	Kyoto Purple Sanga	23	(2)
Total		80	(5)
Medal record
Gamba Osaka
Winner	Emperor's Cup	1990
- * Club domestic league appearances and goals

Kazuaki Koezuka (肥塚 一晃, Koezuka Kazuaki; born February 10, 1967) is a former Japanese football player.

== Playing career ==
Koezuka was born in Osaka Prefecture on February 10, 1967. After graduating from Tenri University, he joined his local club, the Matsushita Electric (later Gamba Osaka) in 1989. In 1990, he became a regular player as a midfielder and the club won the Emperor's Cup, the first major title in club history. In 1993, he did not play as often and he moved to the Japan Football League club Kyoto Purple Sanga in 1994. He retired at the end of the 1994 season.

== Club statistics ==
Club performance			League		Cup		League Cup		Total	
Season	Club	League	Apps	Goals	Apps	Goals	Apps	Goals	Apps	Goals
Japan			League		Emperor's Cup		J.League Cup		Total	
1989/90	Matsushita Electric	JSL Division 1	3	0			0	0	3	0
1990/91	Matsushita Electric	JSL Division 1	18	2			0	0	18	2
1991/92	Matsushita Electric	JSL Division 1	21	1			1	0	21	2
1992	Gamba Osaka	J1 League	-				6	0	6	0
1993	Gamba Osaka	J1 League	15	0	0	0	5	1	20	1
1994	Kyoto Purple Sanga	Football League	23	2	3	1	-		26	3
Total			80	5	3	1	12	1	95	7
