= Rumen Nenov =

Bulgarian footballer

Personal information
- Date of birth: 29 December 1969
- Place of birth: Razlog, Bulgaria
- Date of death: 15 June 2017 (aged 47)
- Place of death: Bulgaria
- Position: Goalkeeper

Senior career*
Years	Team	Apps	(Gls)
1988–1990	Botev Vratsa	68	(0)
1991–1993	CSKA Sofia	26	(1)
1993	Slavia Sofia	14	(0)
1994–1995	CSKA Sofia	18	(0)
1995–1996	Metalurg Pernik		
1996–1998	Lokomotiv Sofia	24	(0)
1999–2000	Slavia Sofia	12	(0)
2000–2001	Septemvri Sofia		
2001–2002	Vihren Sandanski		
2002–2003	Pirin Blagoevgrad		

Managerial career
- 2008–2009: Belasitsa Petrich (goalkeeping coach)
- 2009–2010: Bansko (goalkeeping coach)
- 2012–2013: Chavdar Etropole (goalkeeping coach)
- 2013: Botev Vratsa (goalkeeping coach)
- 2015: Botev Vratsa (goalkeeping coach)
- * Club domestic league appearances and goals

Rumen Nenov (Bulgarian: Румен Ненов; 29 December 1969 – 15 June 2017) was a Bulgarian footballer who played as a goalkeeper.

== Honours ==
CSKA Sofia

- A Group: 1991–92
- Bulgarian Cup: 1992–93
