= 1991–92 A Group =

44th completed season of top-tier football league in Bulgaria

A Group
- Season: 1991–92
- Dates: 17 August 1991 – 31 May 1992
- Champions: CSKA Sofia (27th title)
- Relegated: Minyor, Hebar
- Champions League: CSKA Sofia
- UEFA Cup: Lokomotiv Plovdiv; Botev Plovdiv
- Matches: 240
- Goals: 553 (2.3 per match)
- Top goalscorer: Nasko Sirakov (26 goals)

The 1991–92 A Group was the 44th season of the A Football Group, the top Bulgarian professional league for association football clubs, since its establishment in 1948.

== Overview ==
It was contested by 16 teams, and CSKA Sofia won the championship.

Dunav Ruse and Haskovo were relegated at the end of the last season. They were replaced by two teams from the B Group, Dobrudzha and Hebar.

== Team information ==
=== Stadia and locations ===
The following teams have ensured their participation in A Group for season 1991–92 (listed in alphabetical order):

Location of teams in 1991–92 A Group
Sofia 1991–92 A Group football clubs

Team	City	Stadium	Capacity
Beroe	Stara Zagora	Beroe	16,000
Botev	Plovdiv	Hristo Botev	18,000
Chernomorets	Burgas	Chernomorets	22,000
CSKA	Sofia	Bulgarian Army	22,995
Dobrudzha	Dobrich	Druzhba	12,500
Etar	Veliko Tarnovo	Ivaylo	18,000
Hebar	Pazardzhik	Georgi Benkovski	13,128
Levski	Sofia	Georgi Asparuhov	29,986
Lokomotiv	Gorna Oryahovitsa	Dimitar Dyulgerov	14,000
Lokomotiv	Plovdiv	Lokomotiv	24,000
Lokomotiv	Sofia	Lokomotiv	22,000
Minyor	Pernik	Minyor	20,000
Pirin	Blagoevgrad	Hristo Botev	15,000
Slavia	Sofia	Ovcha Kupel	18,000
Sliven	Sliven	Hadzhi Dimitar	15,000
Yantra	Gabrovo	Hristo Botev	12,000

== League standings ==
Pos	Team	Pld	W	D	L	GF	GA	GD	Pts	Qualification or relegation
1	CSKA Sofia (C)	30	20	7	3	74	26	+48	47	Qualification for Champions League first round
2	Levski Sofia	30	19	7	4	54	18	+36	45	Qualification for Cup Winners' Cup first round
3	Lokomotiv Plovdiv	30	14	9	7	42	22	+20	37	Qualification for UEFA Cup first round
4	Botev Plovdiv	30	13	11	6	46	27	+19	37	Qualification for UEFA Cup first round
5	Etar Veliko Tarnovo	30	12	13	5	35	18	+17	37	
6	Sliven	30	12	8	10	37	39	−2	32	
7	Beroe Stara Zagora	30	10	10	10	32	41	−9	30	
8	Lokomotiv Sofia	30	10	9	11	38	40	−2	29	
9	Yantra Gabrovo	30	8	11	11	24	33	−9	27	
10	Slavia Sofia	30	8	10	12	33	31	+2	26	
11	Lokomotiv G. Oryahovitsa	30	9	8	13	23	39	−16	26	
12	Chernomorets Burgas	30	8	9	13	28	43	−15	25	
13	Pirin Blagoevgrad	30	7	9	14	22	34	−12	23	
14	Dobrudzha Dobrich	30	8	7	15	29	48	−19	23	
15	Minyor Pernik (R)	30	5	9	16	19	51	−32	19	Relegation to 1992–93 B Group
16	Hebar Pazardzhik (R)	30	3	11	16	17	43	−26	17	Relegation to 1992–93 B Group

Source: rsssf.com
(C) Champions; (R) Relegated

== Results ==
Home \ Away	BSZ	BOT	CHB	CSK	DOB	ETA	HEB	LEV	LGO	LPL	LSO	MIN	PIR	SLA	SLI	YAN
Beroe Stara Zagora		3–2	2–2	2–2	3–1	0–0	0–0	2–1	1–0	1–0	0–2	1–0	1–0	1–0	3–0	0–0
Botev Plovdiv	2–0		4–1	2–2	3–0	2–0	3–1	2–0	3–0	1–1	2–1	5–1	1–0	2–1	2–0	0–0
Chernomorets Burgas	1–1	1–0		0–2	4–1	0–0	1–0	1–0	1–0	1–3	1–1	3–0	1–0	0–0	0–0	1–1
CSKA Sofia	10–2	1–1	3–0		2–1	2–0	1–0	2–2	5–0	2–1	2–1	7–0	2–0	3–1	3–1	3–0
Dobrudzha Dobrich	1–1	1–1	3–0	0–4		2–4	4–1	1–0	1–0	2–0	1–1	0–0	3–0	0–0	1–2	1–0
Etar Veliko Tarnovo	1–1	1–1	2–1	1–0	2–0		1–0	0–0	1–1	3–0	5–0	3–0	2–0	1–1	2–1	1–1
Hebar Pazardzhik	1–1	0–1	0–3	0–1	0–1	0–0		1–1	0–0	0–3	1–1	2–0	1–1	2–1	1–3	2–1
Levski Sofia	2–1	2–1	4–0	2–1	4–1	0–0	2–0		5–0	2–0	2–0	2–1	3–1	2–1	4–0	3–1
Lokomotiv G. Oryahovitsa	1–0	2–2	0–0	0–1	1–0	0–2	1–1	0–2		2–0	4–2	1–0	1–1	1–1	2–1	2–0
Lokomotiv Plovdiv	3–0	1–0	5–2	1–1	3–1	1–0	2–0	0–0	2–0		0–0	4–0	1–0	2–0	1–1	3–0
Lokomotiv Sofia	0–1	4–1	3–0	2–2	3–0	2–1	2–0	0–3	3–1	0–3		1–0	2–0	0–0	1–2	2–0
Minyor Pernik	2–0	1–1	1–0	1–0	0–0	0–0	2–2	0–1	0–1	1–1	2–2		1–1	0–2	0–0	2–0
Pirin Blagoevgrad	1–0	1–1	1–0	1–2	4–1	0–1	2–0	0–2	0–0	0–0	1–1	3–0		1–0	2–1	1–1
Slavia Sofia	1–1	0–0	2–0	2–2	2–0	1–0	1–1	0–2	2–0	1–1	4–1	0–1	4–0		1–2	2–1
Sliven	3–2	1–0	2–2	1–3	1–1	0–0	3–0	1–1	1–2	1–0	0–0	4–2	1–0	2–1		2–1
Yantra Gabrovo	2–1	0–0	2–1	1–3	2–0	1–1	0–0	0–0	1–0	0–0	1–0	4–1	0–0	2–1	1–0	

Source: A PFG (in Bulgarian)
Legend: Blue = home team win; Yellow = draw; Red = away team win.

== Champions ==
CSKA Sofia

Goalkeepers
(Bulgaria) Georgi Velinov	29	(0)
(Bulgaria) Rumen Nenov	1	(0)

Defenders
(Bulgaria) Veliyan Parushev*	15	(0)
(Bulgaria) Pavel Dochev	29	(0)
(Bulgaria) Rosen Kirilov	5	(0)
(Bulgaria) Georgi Nachov*	4	(0)
(Bulgaria) Krasimir Bezinski	15	(1)
(Bulgaria) Emil Dimitrov*	10	(1)
(Bulgaria) Radoslav Vidov	28	(0)
(Bulgaria) Stefan Kolev	17	(0)
(Bulgaria) Trifon Ivanov	5	(1)
(Bulgaria) Zarko Machev	7	(0)

Midfielders
(Bulgaria) Viktorio Pavlov*	7	(0)
(Bulgaria) Yordan Lechkov	29	(17)
(Bulgaria) Stoycho Stoilov	13	(1)
(Bulgaria) Ivaylo Kirov	14	(0)
(Bulgaria) Anatoli Nankov	27	(5)
(Bulgaria) Kiril Metkov	15	(11)
(Bulgaria) Lachezar Tanev	9	(1)
(Bulgaria) Yordan Marinov*	13	(0)

Forwards
(Bulgaria) Ivaylo Andonov	30	(16)
(Bulgaria) Stefan Draganov	11	(6)
(Bulgaria) Hristo Marashliev	12	(3)
(Bulgaria) Anton Dimitrov	19	(4)
(Bulgaria) Todor Pramatarov*	13	(4)

Manager
(Bulgaria) Asparuh Nikodimov

- Parushev, Nachov, E. Dimitrov, Pavlov, Marinov and Pramatarov left the club during the season.

== Top scorers ==
Rank	Scorer	Club	Goals
1	(Bulgaria) Nasko Sirakov	Levski Sofia	26
2	(Bulgaria) Yordan Lechkov	CSKA Sofia	17
2	(Bulgaria) Vladimir Stoyanov	Lokomotiv Sofia	17
4	(Bulgaria) Ivaylo Andonov	CSKA Sofia	16
5	(Bulgaria) Kiril Metkov	Lokomotiv Sofia (3); CSKA Sofia (11)	14
6	(Bulgaria) Aleksandar Radev	Lokomotiv Plovdiv	13
7	(Bulgaria) Rumen Chakarov	Pirin Blagoevgrad	11
7	(Bulgaria) Kancho Yordanov	Etar	11
9	(Bulgaria) Rumen Stoyanov	Dobrudzha	10
10	(Bulgaria) Dimitar Trendafilov	Beroe	9
10	(Bulgaria) Marin Bakalov	Botev Plovdiv	9
10	(Bulgaria) Todor Zaytsev	Botev Plovdiv	9
10	(Bulgaria) Boris Hvoynev	Botev Plovdiv	9
10	(Bulgaria) Zhivko Kelepov	Sliven	9

- Source:1991–92 Top Goalscorers
