= Katsuhiro Kusaki =

Japanese footballer and manager

Katsuhiro Kusaki 草木 克洋
Personal information
- Full name: Katsuhiro Kusaki
- Date of birth: April 12, 1962 (age 64)
- Place of birth: Kyoto, Japan
- Height: 1.77 m (5 ft 9 1/2 in)
- Positions: Midfielder; forward

Youth career
- 1978–1980: Rakunan High School

Senior career*
Years	Team	Apps	(Gls)
1981–1992	Yanmar Diesel	155	(33)
1992–1993	Gamba Osaka	13	(2)
1994	Kyoto Purple Sanga	18	(5)
Total		186	(40)

International career
1988	Japan	2	(0)

Managerial career
- 1998–1999: Sagawa Express Osaka
- 2003–2006: ALO's Hokuriku
- 2016–2017: Amitie SC Kyoto
Medal record
Yanmar Diesel
Winner	JSL Cup	1983
Winner	JSL Cup	1984
Runner-up	JSL Cup	1982
Runner-up	Emperor's Cup	1983
- * Club domestic league appearances and goals

Katsuhiro Kusaki (草木 克洋, Kusaki Katsuhiro; born April 12, 1962) is a former Japanese football player and manager. He played for Japan national team.

== Club career ==
Kusaki was born in Kyoto Prefecture on April 12, 1962. After graduating from high school, he joined Yanmar Diesel in 1981. The club won 1983 and 1984 JSL Cup. He moved to Gamba Osaka in 1992. He moved to his local club Kyoto Purple Sanga in 1994. He retired in 1994.

== National team career ==
On January 27, 1988, Kusaki debuted for Japan national team against United Arab Emirates. He played two games for Japan in 1988.

== Coaching career ==
After retirement, Kusaki signed with Sagawa Express Osaka in 1997 and became a manager in 1998. He managed until 1999. Through a coach for Sagan Tosu, he signed with ALO's Hokuriku in 2003. He managed until 2006. Through Kansai University of International Studies and Seibi University manager, he signed with Amitie SC Kyoto. He was terminated in September 2017.

== Club statistics ==
Club performance			League		Cup		League Cup		Total	
Season	Club	League	Apps	Goals	Apps	Goals	Apps	Goals	Apps	Goals
Japan			League		Emperor's Cup		J.League Cup		Total	
1981	Yanmar Diesel	JSL Division 1	0	0	0	0	0	0	0	0
1982	Yanmar Diesel	JSL Division 1	2	0	2	0	2	0	6	0
1983	Yanmar Diesel	JSL Division 1	15	5	4	0	4	2	23	7
1984	Yanmar Diesel	JSL Division 1	18	1	3	0	4	2	25	3
1985/86	Yanmar Diesel	JSL Division 1	22	5	2	0	2	2	26	7
1986/87	Yanmar Diesel	JSL Division 1	13	4	0	0	0	0	13	4
1987/88	Yanmar Diesel	JSL Division 1	18	5	1	0	2	1	21	6
1988/89	Yanmar Diesel	JSL Division 1	22	9	2	3	4	3	28	15
1989/90	Yanmar Diesel	JSL Division 1	12	1	0	0	0	0	12	1
1990/91	Yanmar Diesel	JSL Division 1	20	1			2	0	22	1
1991/92	Yanmar Diesel	JSL Division 2	13	2			1	0	14	2
1992	Gamba Osaka	J1 League	-				6	1	6	1
1993	Gamba Osaka	J1 League	13	2	0	0	3	1	16	3
1994	Kyoto Purple Sanga	Football League	18	5	3	1	-		21	6
Total			186	40	17	4	30	12	233	56

== National team statistics ==
Japan national team
Year	Apps	Goals
1988	2	0
Total	2	0
