= Bismarck (footballer, born 1969) =

Brazilian footballer (born 1969)

Personal information
- Full name: Bismarck Barreto Faria
- Date of birth: 17 September 1969 (age 57)
- Place of birth: São Gonçalo, Brazil
- Height: 1.77 m (5 ft 10 in)
- Position: Midfielder

Youth career
- 1979–1986: Vasco da Gama

Senior career*
Years	Team	Apps	(Gls)
1987–1993	Vasco da Gama	85	(28)
1993–1996	Verdy Kawasaki	137	(36)
1997–2001	Kashima Antlers	137	(33)
2002	Fluminense		
2002	Goiás	10	(1)
2003	Vissel Kobe	9	(0)

International career
1985	Brazil U17	6	(3)
1987–1989	Brazil U20	10	(3)
1989–1990	Brazil	13	(1)
- * Club domestic league appearances and goals

Bismarck Barreto Faria, better known as Bismarck (born 11 November 1969) is a Brazilian former professional footballer who played as a midfielder.

== Club career ==
Bismarck was born in São Gonçalo, Rio de Janeiro State. His professional career began in 1987 playing for Vasco da Gama of Brazil. In 1993, he moved to Japan to play for the Verdy Kawasaki of the J1 League. During his three seasons at Verdy, Bismarck was twice selected as a member of the J. League Best Eleven, in 1994 and 1995. In 1997, he moved to Kashima Antlers, where he was again selected for the league's Best Eleven award in his first season with the new club. In 2002, he returned to Brazil to play for the Fluminense and the Goiás. However, in 2003 Bismarck would return to Japan to play for Vissel Kobe before retiring at the end of that season.

== International career ==
Bismarck was part of the Brazil national under-20 football team that placed third in 1989 FIFA World Youth Championship. He won the MVP Award, the Adidas Golden Ball, for his performances throughout the tournament. At senior level, he was also a member of the Brazil national team that won the Copa América in 1989, and represented his nation in the 1990 FIFA World Cup in Italy.

== Personal life ==
He is named after Otto von Bismarck, the famous politician who played an important role in the creation of one of the world's Great Powers, the German Empire.

Bismarck, along with one-time Brazilian football teammates Jorginho and Cláudio Taffarel, were featured in a special version of the film Jesus produced and distributed during the 1998 World Cup.

== Career statistics ==
=== Club ===
Appearances and goals by club, season and competition
Club	Season	League			National Cup		League Cup		Total	
Club	Season	Division	Apps	Goals	Apps	Goals	Apps	Goals	Apps	Goals
Vasco da Gama	1987	Série A	1	0					1	0
Vasco da Gama	1988	Série A	24	8					24	8
Vasco da Gama	1989	Série A	17	8					17	8
Vasco da Gama	1990	Série A	16	5					16	5
Vasco da Gama	1991	Série A	7	2					7	2
Vasco da Gama	1992	Série A	20	5					20	5
Vasco da Gama	Total		85	28					85	28
Verdy Kawasaki	1993	J1 League	17	6	3	2	7	6	27	14
Verdy Kawasaki	1994	J1 League	42	14	2	1	3	6	47	21
Verdy Kawasaki	1995	J1 League	51	11	3	1	–		54	12
Verdy Kawasaki	1996	J1 League	27	5	5	3	15	4	47	12
Verdy Kawasaki	Total		137	36	13	7	25	16	175	59
Kashima Antlers	1997	J1 League	32	11	5	2	11	3	48	16
Kashima Antlers	1998	J1 League	30	6	3	1	3	0	36	7
Kashima Antlers	1999	J1 League	23	7	2	1	5	2	30	10
Kashima Antlers	2000	J1 League	26	3	4	0	7	2	37	5
Kashima Antlers	2001	J1 League	26	6	0	0	6	0	32	6
Kashima Antlers	Total		137	33	14	4	32	7	183	44
Fluminense	2002	Série A	0	0					0	0
Goiás	2002	Série A	10	1					10	1
Vissel Kobe	2003	J1 League	9	0	0	0	6	0	15	0
Career total			378	98	27	11	63	23	468	132

=== International ===
Appearances and goals by national team and year
National team	Year	Apps	Goals
Brazil	1989	7	1
Brazil	1990	4	0
Total		11	1

== Honours ==
=== Club ===
Vasco da Gama

- Campeonato Carioca: 1987, 1988, 1992, 1993
- Campeonato Brasileiro Série A: 1989

Verdy Kawasaki

- J1 League: 1993, 1994
- Emperor's Cup: 1996
- J. League Cup: 1993, 1994
- Japanese Super Cup: 1994, 1995

Kashima Antlers

- J1 League: 1998, 2000, 2001
- Emperor's Cup: 2000
- J. League Cup: 2000
- Japanese Super Cup: 1998, 1999

=== International ===
Brazil

- Copa América: 1989

=== Individual ===
- J1 League Best Eleven: 1994, 1995, 1997
- FIFA U-20 World Cup Golden Ball: 1989
