= Akihiro Nagashima =

Japanese footballer

Akihiro Nagashima 永島 昭浩
Personal information
- Full name: Akihiro Nagashima
- Date of birth: April 9, 1964 (age 62)
- Place of birth: Kobe, Hyogo, Japan
- Height: 1.82 m (5 ft 11 1/2 in)
- Position: Forward

Youth career
- 1980–1982: Mikage Technical High School

Senior career*
Years	Team	Apps	(Gls)
1983–1993	Gamba Osaka		
1994–1995	Shimizu S-Pulse	38	(9)
1995–2000	Vissel Kobe	138	(67)

International career
1990–1991	Japan	4	(0)
Medal record
Gamba Osaka
Winner	Emperor's Cup	1990
- * Club domestic league appearances and goals

Akihiro Nagashima (永島 昭浩, Nagashima Akihiro; born April 9, 1964) is a former Japanese football player. He played for the Japan national team.

== Club career ==
Nagashima was born in Kobe on April 9, 1964. After graduating from high school, he joined the Regional Leagues club Matsushita Electric (now Gamba Osaka) in 1983. In 1984, the club was promoted to the Japan Soccer League. The club won the 1990 Emperor's Cup. In 1992, the Japan Soccer League dissolved and founded a new league, J1 League. On June 5, 1993, Nagashima scored a hat-trick against Nagoya Grampus Eight, becoming the first Japanese player in J1 League to do so. In 1994, he moved to Shimizu S-Pulse.

In January 1995, the Great Hanshin earthquake occurred in his local Kobe. In June, Nagashima moved to Japan Football League club Vissel Kobe to encourage those in the disaster area. In 1996, the club won the 2nd place and was promoted to J1 League. He played 138 games and scored 67 goals for the club. He retired in 2000.

== National team career ==
On July 27, 1990, Nagashima debuted for Japan national team against South Korea. He played four games for Japan until 1991.

== Personal life ==
He is the father of Yūmi Nagashima (born November 23, 1991), an announcer for Fuji TV.

== Club statistics ==
Club performance			League		Cup		League Cup		Total	
Season	Club	League	Apps	Goals	Apps	Goals	Apps	Goals	Apps	Goals
Japan			League		Emperor's Cup		J.League Cup		Total	
1983	Matsushita Electric	Regional Leagues								
1984	Matsushita Electric	JSL Division 2	7	0	0	0	2	0	9	0
1985/86	Matsushita Electric	JSL Division 2	6	2	1	0	2	0	9	2
1986/87	Matsushita Electric	JSL Division 1	22	7	2	0	1	0	25	7
1987/88	Matsushita Electric	JSL Division 2	14	6	3	0	1	0	18	6
1988/89	Matsushita Electric	JSL Division 1	21	5	2	0	1	0	24	5
1989/90	Matsushita Electric	JSL Division 1	22	15	1	0	0	0	23	15
1990/91	Matsushita Electric	JSL Division 1	21	8	5	4	1	1	27	13
1991/92	Matsushita Electric	JSL Division 1	21	8			3	3	24	11
1992	Gamba Osaka	J1 League	-		3	2	9	5	12	7
1993	Gamba Osaka	J1 League	32	12	0	0	6	5	38	17
1994	Shimizu S-Pulse	J1 League	28	8	0	0	1	1	29	9
1995	Shimizu S-Pulse	J1 League	10	1	0	0	-		10	1
1995	Vissel Kobe	Football League	15	10	3	0	-		18	10
1996	Vissel Kobe	Football League	28	17	3	5	-		31	22
1997	Vissel Kobe	J1 League	32	22	2	1	5	3	39	26
1998	Vissel Kobe	J1 League	28	10	2	2	3	1	33	13
1999	Vissel Kobe	J1 League	26	7	0	0	1	0	27	7
2000	Vissel Kobe	J1 League	9	1	0	0	1	0	10	1
Total			342	139	27	14	37	19	406	172

== National team statistics ==
Japan national team
Year	Apps	Goals
1990	3	0
1991	1	0
Total	4	0

== Awards ==
- Japan Soccer League Best Eleven: 1989-90
