= Sojiro Ishii =

Japanese footballer

Sojiro Ishii 石井 壮二郎
Personal information
- Full name: Sojiro Ishii
- Date of birth: March 29, 1970 (age 56)
- Place of birth: Hyogo, Japan
- Height: 1.76 m (5 ft 9 1/2 in)
- Positions: Defender; midfielder

Youth career
- 1985–1987: Mikage High School
- 1988–1991: Meiji University

Senior career*
Years	Team	Apps	(Gls)
1992–1996	Gamba Osaka	36	(1)
1997–1998	Denso		
- * Club domestic league appearances and goals

Sojiro Ishii (石井 壮二郎, Ishii Sojiro; born March 29, 1970) is a former Japanese football player.

== Playing career ==
Ishii was born in Hyogo Prefecture on March 29, 1970. After graduating from Meiji University, he joined Gamba Osaka in 1992. He played many matches as side back from 1993. However, he did not play as often 1995 and he did not play at all in 1996. In 1997, he moved to the Japan Football League club Denso. He retired at the end of the 1998 season.

== Career statistics ==
Appearances and goals by club, season and competition
Club	Season	League			Emperor's Cup		J.League Cup		Total	
Club	Season	Division	Apps	Goals	Apps	Goals	Apps	Goals	Apps	Goals
Gamba Osaka	1992	J1 League	—				0	0	0	0
Gamba Osaka	1993	J1 League	14	1	2	0	1	0	17	1
Gamba Osaka	1994	J1 League	16	0	0	0	0	0	16	0
Gamba Osaka	1995	J1 League	6	0	0	0	—		6	0
Gamba Osaka	1996	J1 League	0	0			0	0	0	0
Career total			36	1	2	0	1	0	39	1
