= Flávio Campos =

Brazilian footballer and manager (born 1965)

Personal information
- Full name: Flávio Henrique de Paiva Campos
- Date of birth: August 29, 1965 (age 61)
- Place of birth: Rio de Janeiro, Brazil
- Height: 1.90 m (6 ft 3 in)
- Position: Midfielder

Senior career*
Years	Team	Apps	(Gls)
1987–1988	Flamengo		
1988–1991	São Paulo		
1991	Guarani		
1992	Vasco da Gama		
1993–1994	Gamba Osaka	57	(9)
1995	Bragantino		
1995	Juventude		
1996	Kyoto Purple Sanga	11	(1)
1996	Juventude		
1997	América-SP		
1997–1999	Juventude		

Managerial career
- 2002: 15 de Novembro
- 2007: Juventude
- 2007: Canoas
- 2009: Remo
- 2009: Brasil de Pelotas
- 2010: Sampaio Corrêa
- 2012–2013: Lajeadense
- 2014: Esportivo
- * Club domestic league appearances and goals

Flávio Henrique de Paiva Campos (born August 29, 1965) is a former Brazilian football player and manager.

== Club statistics ==
Appearances and goals by club, season and competition
Club	Season	League			Emperor's Cup		J.League Cup		Total	
Club	Season	Division	Apps	Goals	Apps	Goals	Apps	Goals	Apps	Goals
Gamba Osaka	1993	J1 League	23	4	2	0	5	1	30	5
Gamba Osaka	1994	J1 League	35	5	4	4	3	3	42	12
Kyoto Purple Sanga	1996	J1 League	11	1	0	0	0	0	11	0
Career total			69	10	6	4	8	4	83	18
