= Hiroki Azuma (footballer) =

Japanese footballer (born 1966)

Hiroki Azuma 東 博樹
Personal information
- Full name: Hiroki Azuma
- Date of birth: July 10, 1966 (age 60)
- Place of birth: Kyoto, Japan
- Height: 1.79 m (5 ft 10 1/2 in)
- Position: Defender

Youth career
- 1985–1988: Doshisha University

Senior career*
Years	Team	Apps	(Gls)
1989–1993	Gamba Osaka		
1994–1995	Yokohama Flügels	9	(0)
1996–1997	Vissel Kobe		
- * Club domestic league appearances and goals

Hiroki Azuma (東 博樹, Azuma Hiroki; born July 10, 1966) is a former Japanese football player.

== Playing career ==
Azuma was born in Kyoto Prefecture on July 10, 1966. After graduating from Doshisha University, he joined Japan Soccer League club Matsushita Electric (later Gamba Osaka) in 1989. Although he played many matches as defender, his opportunity to play decreased in 1993. In 1994, he moved to Yokohama Flügels. Although he played in 2 seasons, he could not play many matches. In 1996, he moved to Japan Football League club Vissel Kobe. The club won the 2nd place in 1996 and was promoted to J1 League. However he could not play at all in the match in 1997 and retired end of 1997 season.

== Club statistics ==
Club performance			League		Cup		League Cup		Total	
Season	Club	League	Apps	Goals	Apps	Goals	Apps	Goals	Apps	Goals
Japan			League		Emperor's Cup		J.League Cup		Total	
1989/90	Matsushita Electric	JSL Division 1								
1990/91	Matsushita Electric	JSL Division 1								
1991/92	Matsushita Electric	JSL Division 1								
1992	Gamba Osaka	J1 League	-				9	0	9	0
1993	Gamba Osaka	J1 League	12	1	1	0	1	0	14	1
1994	Yokohama Flügels	J1 League	7	0	0	0	0	0	7	0
1995	Yokohama Flügels	J1 League	2	0	0	0	-		2	0
1996	Vissel Kobe	Football League								
1997	Vissel Kobe	J1 League	0	0			0	0	0	0
Total			21	1	1	0	10	0	32	1
