= Luís Müller =

Brazilian footballer

Personal information
- Full name: Miguel Luís Müller
- Date of birth: February 14, 1961 (age 65)
- Place of birth: Brazil
- Height: 1.74 m (5 ft 8 1/2 in)
- Position: Midfielder

Senior career*
Years	Team	Apps	(Gls)
1978–1980	São Paulo		
1988–1991	Torino		
1992–1993	Gamba Osaka		
- * Club domestic league appearances and goals

Miguel Luís Müller (born February 14, 1961) is a former Brazilian football player.

== Playing career ==
In 1992, Müller joined new Japanese league, J1 League club Gamba Osaka. He played many matches as forward and scored 3 goals in 1992 J.League Cup. However Gamba finished at the 8th place of 10 clubs. In 1993 season, he played as midfielder and scored many goals in J1 League first season. He left the club end of 1993 season.

== Career statistics ==
Appearances and goals by club, season and competition
Club	Season	League			Emperor's Cup		J.League Cup		Total	
Club	Season	Division	Apps	Goals	Apps	Goals	Apps	Goals	Apps	Goals
Gamba Osaka	1992	J1 League	—				8	3	8	3
Gamba Osaka	1993	J1 League	18	7	0	0	2	1	20	8
Career total			18	7	0	0	10	4	28	11
