= Gène Hanssen =

Dutch footballer

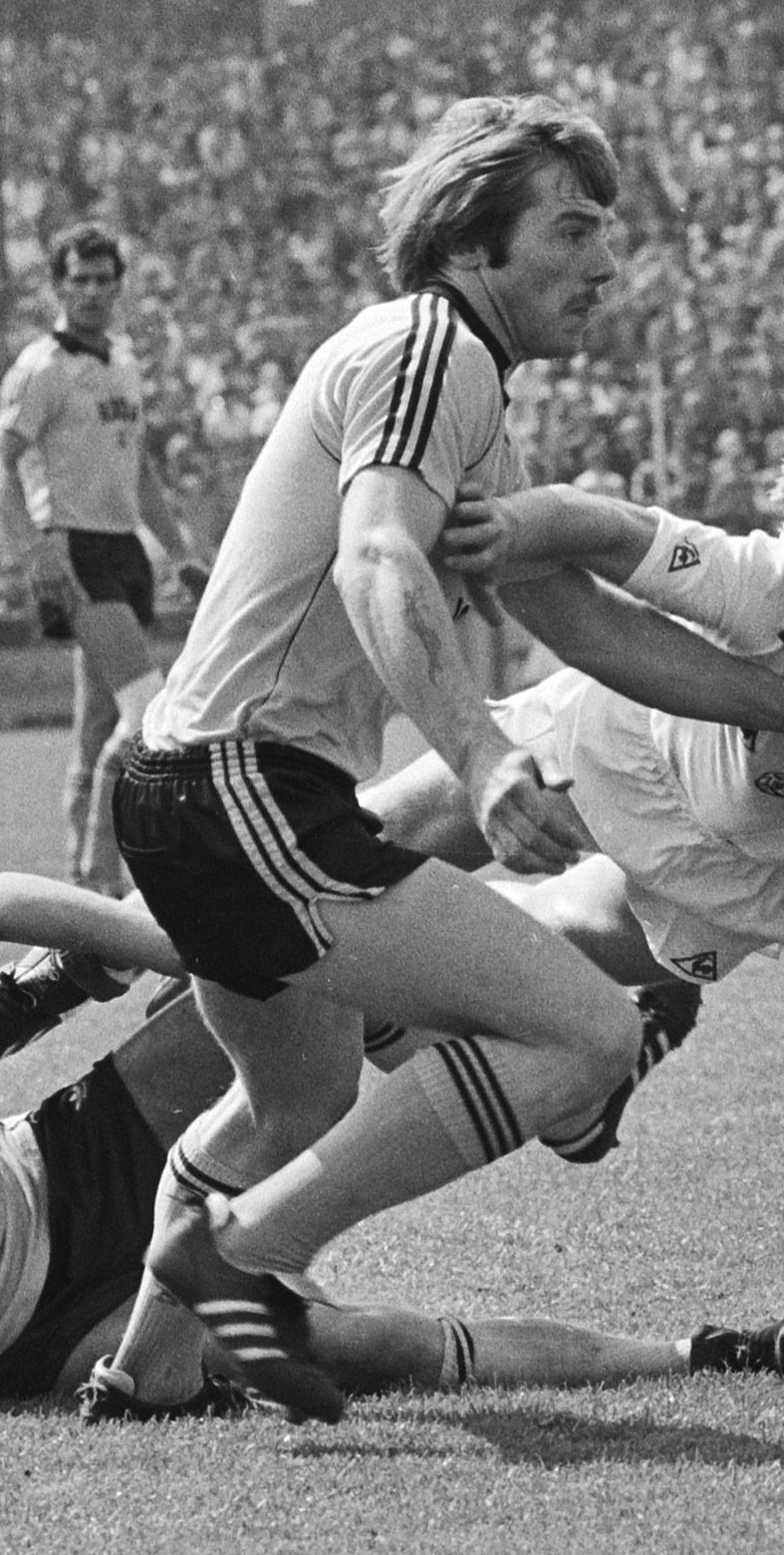
- Hanssen with Roda in 1982

Personal information
- Full name: Eugène Hanssen
- Date of birth: 9 January 1959 (age 67)
- Place of birth: Ubach over Worms, Netherlands
- Height: 1.75 m (5 ft 9 in)
- Position: Defender

Youth career
- RKVV Waubach
- Waubachsche Boys
- RKSV Sylvia

Senior career*
Years	Team	Apps	(Gls)
1978–1993	Roda JC	442	(30)
1993	Verdy Kawasaki	18	(3)
1993–1994	VVV	31	(1)
1994–1996	Lommel	53	(0)
1996–2000	Germania Teveren	77	(0)
Total		621	(34)
- * Club domestic league appearances and goals

Gène Hanssen (born 9 January 1959) is a Dutch retired football player.

== Career ==
Son of a miner, Hanssen started playing football for local amateur sides Waubachsche Boys and then RKSV Sylvia before joining the youth set-up of Roda JC. His hardworking mentality, tattoed arms and unyieldingness made him an iconic player of the miners club (Koempels) and he spent the majority of his career at the Eredivisie side.

At the end of his career, he had a brief spell with Verdy Kawasaki, but he left the club during its first season in the J1 League due to his wife's homesicknesss, the club agreeing to cancel his contract in July 1993. After a short stint at VVV, he played two years for Belgian top-tier side Lommel. He finished his professional career with German outfit Germania Teveren.

== Personal life ==
After retiring as aplayer, Hanssen guides people receiving social assistance or those who have been out of the workforce for an extended period within the Nico Wolter therapy project. In 2024, his girlfriend Hannelore passed away and he had subsequently to leave their house. Nicknamed Mr. Roda, he loves to keep goldfinches and rabbits.

== Club statistics ==
Club performance			League		Cup		League Cup		Total	
Season	Club	League	Apps	Goals	Apps	Goals	Apps	Goals	Apps	Goals
Japan			League		Emperor's Cup		J.League Cup		Total	
1993	Verdy Kawasaki	J1 League	18	3	0	0	0	0	18	3
Total			18	3	0	0	0	0	18	3

== Honours ==
J - League: 1993

J - League Cup: 1993
