= Masahiro Wada =

Japanese footballer and manager

Masahiro Wada 和田 昌裕
Personal information
- Full name: Masahiro Wada
- Date of birth: January 21, 1965 (age 61)
- Place of birth: Kobe, Hyogo, Japan
- Height: 1.78 m (5 ft 10 in)
- Positions: Defender; midfielder

Youth career
- 1980–1982: Mikage High School

College career
Years	Team	Apps	(Gls)
1983–1986	Juntendo University		

Senior career*
Years	Team	Apps	(Gls)
1987–1995	Gamba Osaka	152	(15)
1995–1998	Vissel Kobe	46	(2)
Total		198	(17)

Managerial career
- 2009: Vissel Kobe (caretaker)
- 2010–2012: Vissel Kobe
- 2014: Chonburi
- 2015: Kyoto Sanga FC
- 2015–2016: Port
- 2016: Sisaket
Medal record
Gamba Osaka
Winner	Emperor's Cup	1990
- * Club domestic league appearances and goals

Masahiro Wada (和田 昌裕, Wada Masahiro; born January 21, 1965) is a Japanese former football player and manager. His sons Atsuki Wada and Tomoki Wada are also footballer.

== Playing career ==
Wada was born in Kobe on January 21, 1965. After graduating from Juntendo University, he joined Matsushita Electric (later Gamba Osaka) in 1987. He played as regular player as left side back and left midfielder from first season. In 1990, the club won the champions 1990 Emperor's Cup first major title in club history. However his opportunity to play decreased from 1994. In July 1995, he moved to his local club Vissel Kobe in Japan Football League. He played as regular player and the club was promoted to J1 League in 1997. However he could hardly play in the match from 1997 and he retired end of 1998 season.

== Coaching career ==
=== Vissel Kobe ===
After the retirement from football, Wada remained as the coaching staff of Vissel Kobe. In 2009, he was appointed as the senior team caretaker after the resignation of Caio Júnior. Wada managed the team for five games in J1 and stepped down from the head coach position after the appointment of Toshiya Miura. He still worked as the assistant coach for the club.

On 12 September 2010, after the dismissal of Miura, Wada was promoted to be the club head coach again. In the later season, Masahiro Wada led Vissel Kobe to finish in the ninth position on J1 League, the highest rank in the club history. However, Wada was sacked by the club in 2012 season after 8 games with 3 wins and 5 losses in J1 since the club had aimed for the top four position for the continental football.

He still worked as the executive staff for Vissel Kobe until November 2013.

=== Chonburi ===
In 2014, Masahiro Wada has become the first foreign head coach of Chonburi in Thai Premier League, followed the invitation of Wittaya Laohakul who was the director of Chonburi and his teammate at Matsushita Electric. Wada finished his season in Thailand with the second place of 2014 Thai Premier League, runner-up of 2014 Thai FA Cup and received the TPL Coach of the Year award. However, he decided to turn down the new contract from Chonburi and return to Japan.

=== Return to Japan ===
In December 2014, Mashiro Wada has returned to Japan and become the manager of Kyoto Sanga FC in J2 League. He later stepped down from his position on 10 July 2015 after dropping the club to the relegation zone.

=== Second spell on Thailand ===
On 22 October 2015, Port F.C. made the official appointment of Masahiro Wada for the last nine games of relegation avoiding in Thai Premier League. Wada made the impressive run with Port but could not save them from relegation. He has maintained his role as the club head coach down in Division 1. Wada was sacked by Port F.C. on 11 July 2016 when the club was in third place and has 5 points away from leading position after 19 games. He was replaced by Jadet Meelarp.

== Club statistics ==
Club performance			League		Cup		League Cup		Total	
Season	Club	League	Apps	Goals	Apps	Goals	Apps	Goals	Apps	Goals
Japan			League		Emperor's Cup		J.League Cup		Total	
1987/88	Matsushita Electric	JSL Division 2	22	11			2	0	24	11
1988/89	Matsushita Electric	JSL Division 1	20	1			0	0	20	1
1989/90	Matsushita Electric	JSL Division 1	21	1			1	0	22	1
1990/91	Matsushita Electric	JSL Division 1	18	0			1	0	19	0
1991/92	Matsushita Electric	JSL Division 1	22	0			3	0	25	0
1992	Gamba Osaka	J1 League	-		3	0	9	0	12	0
1993	Gamba Osaka	J1 League	34	2	2	0	6	0	42	2
1994	Gamba Osaka	J1 League	3	0	0	0	0	0	3	0
1995	Gamba Osaka	J1 League	12	0	0	0	-		12	0
1995	Vissel Kobe	Football League	16	2	3	0	-		19	2
1996	Vissel Kobe	Football League	30	0	3	0	-		33	0
1997	Vissel Kobe	J1 League	0	0	2	0	2	0	4	0
1998	Vissel Kobe	J1 League	0	0	0	0	0	0	0	0
Total			198	17	13	0	22	0	233	17

== Managerial statistic ==
As of 24 September 2016

Nat.	Team	From	To	Record							
Nat.	Team	From	To	G	W	D	L	GF	GA	GD	Win %
(Japan)	Vissel Kobe	2009	2012	63	23	14	26	0	0	+0	36.51
(Thailand)	Chonburi	2 December 2013	10 November 2014	48	27	14	7	80	42	+38	56.25
(Japan)	Kyoto Sanga FC	16 December 2014	10 July 2015	22	6	4	12	0	0	+0	27.27
(Thailand)	Port	22 October 2015	11 July 2016	32	16	10	6	58	36	+22	50.00
(Thailand)	Sisaket	1 September 2016	28 October 2016	3	1	0	2	8	8	+0	33.33
Career totals				168	73	42	53	146	86	+60	43.45

^{1} A win or loss by the penalty shoot-out is counted as the draw in time.
