= Kiril Metkov =

Bulgarian footballer

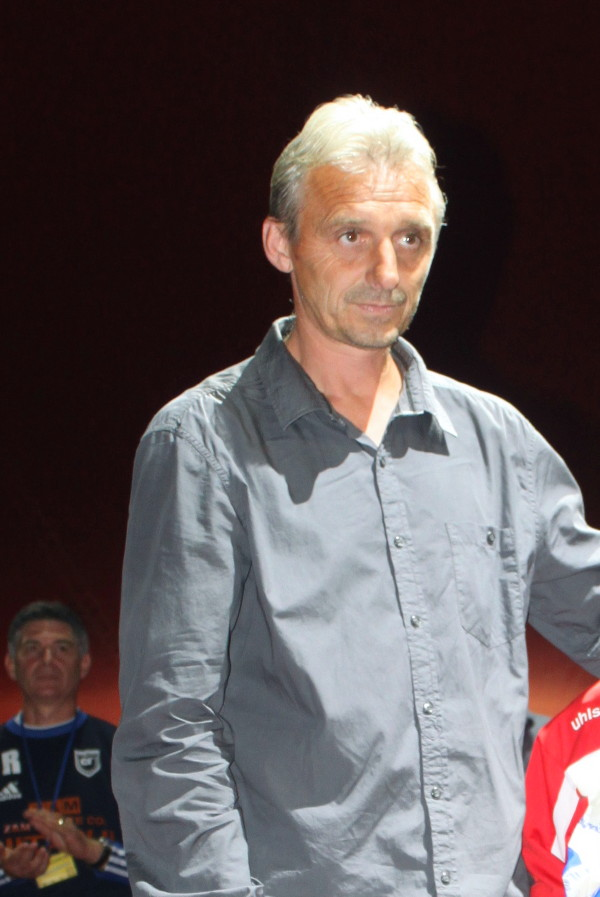

Personal information
- Date of birth: 1 February 1965 (age 61)
- Place of birth: Sofia, Bulgaria
- Height: 1.80 m (5 ft 11 in)
- Position: Attacking midfielder

Senior career*
| Years | Team | Apps | (Gls) |
| 1983–1991 | Lokomotiv Sofia | 229 | (43) |
| 1992–1993 | CSKA Sofia | 37 | (15) |
| 1993–1994 | Gamba Osaka | 10 | (2) |
| 1995 | Slavia Sofia | 4 | (0) |
| Total | | 280 | (60) |

International career
| 1989–1993 | Bulgaria | 9 | (0) |

Managerial career
- 2000–2019: Lokomotiv Sofia (youth)
- 2019–2020: CSKA 1948 II
- 2020–: Vitosha 13 Sofia
- * Club domestic league appearances and goals

Kiril Metkov (born 1 February 1965) is a former Bulgarian professional footballer who played as an attacking midfielder.

He started his domestic football career in 1983, and during his career played for Lokomotiv Sofia, CSKA Sofia, Gamba Osaka and Slavia Sofia, before retiring in 1995.

== Club statistics ==
| Club performance | | | League | | Cup | | League Cup | | Total | |
| Season | Club | League | Apps | Goals | Apps | Goals | Apps | Goals | Apps | Goals |
| Bulgaria | | | League | | Bulgarian Cup | | Continental | | Total | |
|---|---|---|---|---|---|---|---|---|---|---|
| 1991–92 | CSKA Sofia | A Group | 15 | 11 | 2 | 2 | — | | 17 | 13 |
| 1992–93 | CSKA Sofia | A Group | 22 | 4 | 5 | 4 | 2 | 1 | 29 | 9 |
| Total | | | 37 | 15 | 7 | 6 | 2 | 1 | 46 | 22 |
| Japan | | | League | | Emperor's Cup | | J.League Cup | | Total | |
| 1993 | Gamba Osaka | J1 League | 10 | 2 | 2 | 0 | 7 | 2 | 19 | 4 |
| 1994 | Gamba Osaka | J1 League | 0 | 0 | 0 | 0 | 0 | 0 | 0 | 0 |
| Total | | | 10 | 2 | 2 | 0 | 7 | 2 | 19 | 4 |

== National team statistics ==
Bulgaria national team
| Year | Apps | Goals |
|---|---|---|
| 1989 | 1 | 0 |
| 1990 | 0 | 0 |
| 1991 | 3 | 0 |
| 1992 | 2 | 0 |
| 1993 | 3 | 0 |
| Total | 9 | 0 |

== Honours ==
=== Club ===
CSKA Sofia

- Bulgarian League: 1991–92
- Bulgarian Cup: 1992–93
