= Tomoo Kudaka =

Japanese footballer

Tomoo Kudaka 久高 友雄
Personal information
- Full name: Tomoo Kudaka
- Date of birth: March 14, 1963
- Place of birth: Osaka, Japan
- Date of death: September 22, 1999 (aged 36)
- Place of death: Japan
- Height: 1.68 m (5 ft 6 in)
- Position: Midfielder

Youth career
- 1978–1980: Hokuyo High School

Senior career*
Years	Team	Apps	(Gls)
1981–1993	Gamba Osaka		
1994–1995	Cerezo Osaka	34	(0)
Medal record
Gamba Osaka
Winner	Emperor's Cup	1990
Cerezo Osaka
Runner-up	Emperor's Cup	1994
- * Club domestic league appearances and goals

Tomoo Kudaka (久高 友雄, Kudaka Tomoo; March 14, 1963 – September 22, 1999) was a Japanese football player.

== Playing career ==
Kudaka was born in Osaka Prefecture on March 14, 1963. After graduating from high school, he joined his local club, the Matsushita Electric (later Gamba Osaka) in 1981. He played as a regular player for a long time. Although the club played in the Prefectural Leagues in 1981, it was promoted to Regional Leagues in 1983 and the Japan Soccer League in 1984. In 1990, the club won the Emperor's Cup, which was the first major title in club history. In 1992, the Japan Soccer League folded and the new J1 League was founded. In 1994, he moved to a rival club in Osaka, Cerezo Osaka in the Japan Football League. He played as a regular player and the club won the championship in 1994 and was promoted to the J1 League. He retired at the end of the 1995 season.

== Coaching career ==
After retirement, Kudaka became a coach at Cerezo Osaka. He mainly coached for youth team. However, in summer 1999, he was diagnosed with stomach cancer. He died on September 22, 1999, at the age of 36.

== Club statistics ==
Club performance			League		Cup		League Cup		Total	
Season	Club	League	Apps	Goals	Apps	Goals	Apps	Goals	Apps	Goals
Japan			League		Emperor's Cup		J.League Cup		Total	
1981	Matsushita Electric	Prefectural Leagues								
1982	Matsushita Electric	Prefectural Leagues								
1983	Matsushita Electric	Regional Leagues								
1984	Matsushita Electric	JSL Division 2								
1985/86	Matsushita Electric	JSL Division 2								
1986/87	Matsushita Electric	JSL Division 1	22	1					22	1
1987/88	Matsushita Electric	JSL Division 2	26	3			2	0	28	3
1988/89	Matsushita Electric	JSL Division 1	22	0			1	0	23	0
1989/90	Matsushita Electric	JSL Division 1	16	0			1	0	17	0
1990/91	Matsushita Electric	JSL Division 1	20	0			1	0	21	0
1991/92	Matsushita Electric	JSL Division 1	20	0			3	0	23	0
1992	Gamba Osaka	J1 League	-				5	0	5	0
1993	Gamba Osaka	J1 League	26	1	2	0	6	1	34	2
1994	Cerezo Osaka	Football League	24	0	5	0	1	0	30	0
1995	Cerezo Osaka	J1 League	10	0	0	0	-		10	0
Total			186	5	7	0	20	1	213	6
