= Alcindo Sartori =

Brazilian footballer (born 1967)

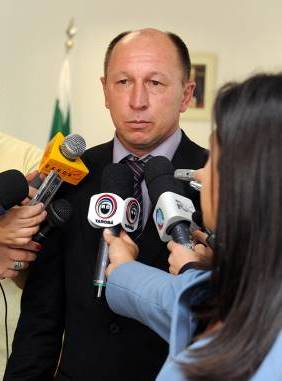
- Alcindo Sartori in 2011

Personal information
- Date of birth: 21 October 1967 (age 59)
- Place of birth: São Miguel do Iguaçu, Brazil
- Height: 1.75 m (5 ft 9 in)
- Position: Forward

Senior career*
Years	Team	Apps	(Gls)
1986–1991	Flamengo	212	(32)
1990	→ São Paulo (loan)	1	(0)
1991–1992	Grêmio	60	(18)
1993–1994	Kashima Antlers	71	(50)
1995	Verdy Kawasaki	38	(19)
1996	Consadole Sapporo	5	(1)
1996	Corinthians	4	(1)
1996	Fluminense	2	(2)
1997	Verdy Kawasaki	16	(10)
1998	Fluminense		
1999	Cabofriense		
2000	CFZ		

International career
1987	Brazil U20	4	(2)
- * Club domestic league appearances and goals

Alcindo Sartori (born 21 October 1967) is a retired Brazilian football player.

== Club career ==
He gained experience playing for Flamengo's reserves and made his first team debut in 1986. He played with players like Zico and in 1987 he was a member in the U-20 Brazil national team which participated in the FIFA World Youth Championship, scoring 2 goals in 4 games.

Alcindo played for Flamengo and São Paulo in the Campeonato Brasileiro.

In 1993, he joined Kashima Antlers in Japan, and with Zico he played a key role in winning the first stage of the J1 League championship, losing in the finals against second stage winners Verdy Kawasaki.

== Personal life ==
Sartori's son Igor is also a professional footballer playing for Hong Kong Premier League club Tai Po.

== Club statistics ==
Club performance			League		Cup		League Cup		Total	
Season	Club	League	Apps	Goals	Apps	Goals	Apps	Goals	Apps	Goals
Japan			League		Emperor's Cup		J.League Cup		Total	
1993	Kashima Antlers	J1 League	28	22	5	3	5	2	38	27
1994	Kashima Antlers	J1 League	43	28	0	0	1	0	44	28
1995	Verdy Kawasaki	J1 League	38	19	2	1	-		40	20
1996	Consadole Sapporo	Football League	5	1	0	0	-		5	1
1997	Verdy Kawasaki	J1 League	16	10	0	0	0	0	16	10
Total			130	80	7	4	6	2	143	86

== Performances in major international tournaments ==
Country	Competition	Category	Appearances		Goals	Team Record
Country	Competition	Category	Start	Sub	Goals	Team Record
Brazil	1987 FIFA World Youth Championship	U-20	4	0	2	Quarterfinals
