= 1992–93 Bulgarian Cup =

Tournament details
- Country: Bulgaria

Final positions
- Champions: CSKA Sofia (15th cup)
- Runners-up: Botev Plovdiv

Tournament statistics
- Top goal scorer(s): Yasen Petrov (Botev) (7 goals)

The 1992–93 Bulgarian Cup was the 53rd season of the Bulgarian Cup. CSKA Sofia won the competition, beating Botev Plovdiv 1–0 in the final at the Hristo Botev Stadium in Blagoevgrad.

== First round ==
Team 1	Agg.	Team 2	1st leg	2nd leg
4 / 7 November 1992
Cherno More Varna	3–2	Lokomotiv Plovdiv	1–0	2–2
Slavia Sofia	0–3	Litex Lovech	0–3	0–0
Lokomotiv Sofia	2–2 (a)	Beroe Stara Zagora	1–0	1–2
Spartak Plovdiv	1–4	CSKA Sofia	1–1	0–3 (w/o)
Chernomorets Burgas	3–0	Maritsa Plovdiv	2–0	1–0
Yantra Gabrovo	1–8	Botev Plovdiv	1–5	0–3 (w/o)
Pirin Blagoevgrad	2–1	Minyor Pernik	1–0	1–1
Dobrudzha Dobrich	2–2 (a)	Svetkavitsa	1–0	1–2
Lokomotiv GO	1–1 (a)	Bdin Vidin	0–0	1–1
Montana	11–0	Minyor Chiprovtsi	8–0	3–0 (w/o)
Shumen	1–3	Etar Veliko Tarnovo	1–2	0–1
Metalik Sopot	1–2	Parvomay	1–1	0–1
Dunav Ruse	5–2	Dorostol Silistra	2–0	3–2
Spartak Varna	1–3	Haskovo	1–1	0–2
Botev Novi Pazar	1–3	Sliven	1–0	0–3
7 / 14 November 1992
Rilski Sportist	3–5	Levski Sofia	1–1	2–4

== Second round ==
Team 1	Agg.	Team 2	1st leg	2nd leg
6 / 12 December 1992
Dunav Ruse	2–2 (a)	Dobrudzha Dobrich	1–2	1–0
Chernomorets Burgas	4–4 (a)	Haskovo	4–2	0–2
Lokomotiv Sofia	2–4	Levski Sofia	1–3	1–1
CSKA Sofia	6–0	Montana	5–0	1–0
Etar Veliko Tarnovo	5–2	Cherno More Varna	5–1	0–1
Litex Lovech	4–5	Lokomotiv GO	3–2	1–3
Pirin Blagoevgrad	1–2	Botev Plovdiv	1–0	0–2 (a.e.t.)
Parvomay	3–4	Sliven	1–2	2–2 (a.e.t.)

== Quarter-finals ==
Team 1	Agg.	Team 2	1st leg	2nd leg
24 March / 7 April 1993
Levski Sofia	8–4	Sliven	6–2	2–2
CSKA Sofia	10–2	Haskovo	5–1	5–1
Botev Plovdiv	4–2	Lokomotiv GO	3–0	1–2
24 March / 21 April 1993
Dobrudzha Dobrich	1–4	Etar Veliko Tarnovo	1–1	0–3

== Semi-finals ==
Team 1	Agg.	Team 2	1st leg	2nd leg
5 / 19 May 1993
Levski Sofia	2–3	Botev Plovdiv	2–0	0–3
Etar Veliko Tarnovo	3–7	CSKA Sofia	2–3	1–4

== Final ==
=== Details ===
2 June 1993
18:00 EEST

CSKA Sofia	1–0	Botev Plovdiv
Metkov 10'

Hristo Botev Stadium, Blagoevgrad
Attendance: 18,000
Referee: Dimo Momirov (Varna)

CSKA	Botev
