= Everton Nogueira =

Brazilian footballer (born 1959)

Personal information
- Full name: Everton Nogueira
- Date of birth: 12 December 1959 (age 66)
- Place of birth: Pradópolis, São Paulo, Brazil
- Height: 1.76 m (5 ft 9 in)
- Position: Attacking midfielder

Senior career*
Years	Team	Apps	(Gls)
1977–1979	Londrina	30	(7)
1981–1983	São Paulo	53	(18)
1983–1984	Guarani	–	(–)
1984–1986	Atlético Mineiro	68	(33)
1987–1988	Corinthians	–	(–)
1988–1989	Porto	10	(2)
1989–1990	Atlético Mineiro	–	(–)
1991–1994	Yokohama Marinos	61	(17)
1994	Kyoto Purple Sanga	14	(2)
- * Club domestic league appearances and goals

Everton Nogueira (born 12 December 1959) is a former Brazilian football player who played as an attacking midfielder.

== Club statistics ==
Club performance			League		Cup		League Cup		Total	
Season	Club	League	Apps	Goals	Apps	Goals	Apps	Goals	Apps	Goals
Japan			League		Emperor's Cup		J.League Cup		Total	
1990/91	Nissan Motors	JSL Division 1	19	4			4	2	23	6
1991/92	Nissan Motors	JSL Division 1	19	8			2	2	21	10
1992	Yokohama Marinos	J1 League	-		5	4	9	7	14	11
1993	Yokohama Marinos	J1 League	22	5	0	0	4	2	26	7
1994	Yokohama Marinos	J1 League	1	0	0	0	0	0	1	0
1994	Kyoto Purple Sanga	Football League	14	2	0	0	-		14	2
Total			75	19	5	4	19	13	99	36
