= 1990 Emperor's Cup =

Tournament details
- Country: Japan

Final positions
- Champions: Matsushita Electric SC
- Runners-up: Nissan Motors
- Semifinalists: Furukawa Electric; Honda

Statistics of Emperor's Cup in the 1990 season.

== Overview ==
It was contested by 32 teams, and Matsushita Electric won the championship.

== Results ==
=== 1st round ===
- Nissan Motors 10–0 Sapporo Mazda
- Mazda 2–1 Hitachi
- Toshiba 5–0 Tanabe Pharmaceuticals
- Mitsubishi Chemical Kurosaki 0–2 NKK
- Yamaha Motors 2–0 Tsukuba University
- Cosmo Oil 0–5 Fujita Industries
- Kochi University 0–2 Seino Transportation
- Kyoto Sangyo University 0–4 Furukawa Electric
- All Nippon Airways 3–0 NEC Yamagata
- National Institute of Fitness and Sports in Kanoya 1–2 Osaka University of Health and Sport Sciences
- Mitsubishi Motors 5–0 Aichi Gakuin University
- Fujitsu 1–2 Honda
- Yanmar Diesel 0–3 Juntendo University
- YKK 2–9 Matsushita Electric
- Kokushikan University 2–1 Osaka University of Commerce
- Waseda University 0–3 Yomiuri

=== 2nd round ===
- Nissan Motors 2–1 Mazda
- Toshiba 5–1 NKK
- Yamaha Motors 2–0 Fujita Industries
- Seino Transportation 0–4 Furukawa Electric
- All Nippon Airways 3–1 Osaka University of Health and Sport Sciences
- Mitsubishi Motors 0–0 (PK 5–6) Honda
- Juntendo University 0–2 Matsushita Electric
- Kokushikan University 1–1 (PK 4–2) Yomiuri

=== Quarterfinals ===
- Nissan Motors 2–1 Toshiba
- Yamaha Motors 0–1 Furukawa Electric
- All Nippon Airways 1–2 Honda
- Matsushita Electric 2–1 Kokushikan University

=== Semifinals ===
- Nissan Motors 1–0 Furukawa Electric
- Honda 1–2 Matsushita Electric

=== Final ===
- Nissan Motors 0–0 (PK 3–4) Matsushita Electric

Matsushita Electric won the championship.
