= 1993 J.League Cup final =

Verdy Kawasaki	Shimizu S-Pulse
2	1
- Date: November 23, 1993
- Venue: National Stadium, Tokyo

1993 J.League Cup final was the 2nd final of the J.League Cup competition. The final was played at National Stadium in Tokyo on November 23, 1993. Verdy Kawasaki won the championship.

== Match details ==
November 23, 1993

Verdy Kawasaki	2–1	Shimizu S-Pulse
Bismarck 73'; Tsuyoshi Kitazawa 85'	Report	Katsumi Oenoki 13'

National Stadium

Verdy Kawasaki
GK	1	(Japan) Shinkichi Kikuchi
DF	6	(Japan) Tadashi Nakamura
DF	2	(Japan) Mitsuhiro Kawamoto	(substituted off) 61'
DF	4	(Netherlands) Rossum
DF	3	(Brazil) Pereira
MF	7	(Brazil) Bismarck
MF	5	(Japan) Tetsuji Hashiratani
MF	10	(Japan) Ruy Ramos
MF	8	(Japan) Tsuyoshi Kitazawa
FW	9	(Japan) Nobuhiro Takeda	(substituted off) 66'
FW	11	(Japan) Kazuyoshi Miura
Substitutes:
GK	16	(Japan) Takayuki Fujikawa
MF	13	(Japan) Yoshiyuki Kato
MF	14	(Japan) Hideki Nagai	(substituted on) 61'
FW	15	(Japan) Yoshinori Abe
FW	12	(Japan) Shinji Fujiyoshi	(substituted on) 66'
Manager:
(Japan) Yasutaro Matsuki

Shimizu S-Pulse
GK	1	(Japan) Masanori Sanada
DF	6	(Japan) Hiroaki Hiraoka
DF	4	(Japan) Takumi Horiike
DF	2	(Brazil) Marco Antonio
DF	3	(Japan) Naoki Naito
MF	8	(Japan) Takamitsu Ota
MF	5	(Japan) Yasutoshi Miura
MF	7	(Japan) Katsumi Oenoki
MF	10	(Japan) Masaaki Sawanobori
FW	9	(Japan) Kenta Hasegawa
FW	11	(Japan) Jun Iwashita	(substituted off) 76'
Substitutes:
GK	16	(Japan) Katsumi Otaki
DF	12	(Japan) Hisashi Kato	(substituted on) 76'
MF	14	(Japan) Masao Sugimoto
FW	15	(Japan) Tatsuru Mukojima
FW	13	(Japan) Ryuji Okada
Manager:
(Brazil) Leao

== See also ==
- 1993 J.League Cup
