= 1993 Shimizu S-Pulse season =

Shimizu S-Pulse
1993 season
- Manager: Émerson Leão
- Stadium: Nihondaira Sports Stadium
- J.League: 3rd
- Emperor's Cup: Semifinals
- J.League Cup: Runners-up
- Top goalscorer: League: Edu (13); All: Edu (18)
- Highest home attendance: 9,464 (vs Yokohama Marinos, 9 June 1993); 51,825 (vs Verdy Kawasaki, 1 December 1993, Tokyo National Stadium)
- Lowest home attendance: 8,699 (vs Urawa Red Diamonds, 25 August 1993)
- Average home league attendance: 18,462
Home colours	Away colours

The 1993 season was Shimizu S-Pulse's second season in existence and their first season in the newly established J1 League. The club also competed in the Emperor's Cup and the J.League Cup. The team finished the season third in the league.

== Review and events ==
=== League results summary ===
Overall								Home						Away					
Pld	W	D	L	GF	GA	GD	Pts	W	D	L	GF	GA	GD	W	D	L	GF	GA	GD
36	24	0	12	54	34	+20	72	12	0	6	29	18	+11	12	0	6	25	16	+9

Source: J.LEAGUE OFFICIAL RECORD & DATA 1994. ISBN 4-09-102309-6.

=== League results by round ===
J.League Suntory series (first stage)
Round	1	2	3	4	5	6	7	8	9	10	11	12	13	14	15	16	17	18
Ground	A	H	H	A	H	H	A	H	A	A	H	H	A	A	H	A	H	A
Result	L	W	W	W	L	L	W	L	L	W	W	W	L	L	W	L	W	W
Position	6	4	5	3	4	6	5	6	7	6	3	3	4	5	4	5	5	4

Source: J.LEAGUE OFFICIAL RECORD & DATA 1994. ISBN 4-09-102309-6.
A = Away; H = Home; W = Win; D = Draw; L = Loss

J.League NICOS series (second stage)
Round	1	2	3	4	5	6	7	8	9	10	11	12	13	14	15	16	17	18
Ground	A	H	A	A	A	A	H	A	H	A	H	H	H	H	A	H	A	H
Result	L	W	W	W	W	W	W	W	W	W	L	W	W	L	W	L	W	W
Position	7	6	3	1	1	1	1	1	1	1	2	2	2	2	2	2	2	2

Source: J.LEAGUE OFFICIAL RECORD & DATA 1994. ISBN 4-09-102309-6.
A = Away; H = Home; W = Win; D = Draw; L = Loss

== Competitions ==
Competitions	Position
J.League	3rd / 10 clubs
Emperor's Cup	Semifinals
J.League Cup	Runners-up

== Domestic results ==
=== J.League ===
==== Suntory series ====
16 May 1993 1st-1	Yokohama Flügels	3–2	Shimizu S-Pulse	Yokohama Mitsuzawa Football Stadium
13:05 JST (UTC+09)	Angelo 9'; Moner 57'; Maeda 59'	J. League	Edu 42'; Toninho 89'	Attendance: 14,126; Referee: Martin Bodenham; Assistant referees: Kiichirō Tachi, Noboru Ishiyama

19 May 1993 1st-2	Shimizu S-Pulse	1–0	Sanfrecce Hiroshima	Nihondaira Sports Stadium
18:58 JST (UTC+09)	Toninho 16'	J. League		Attendance: 9,183; Referee: Kōetsu Kikuchi; Assistant referees: Yoshio Sawada, Yoshimi Ogawa

22 May 1993 1st-3	Shimizu S-Pulse	2–1	Kashima Antlers	Kusanagi Athletic Stadium
19:00 JST (UTC+09)	Toninho 57'; Horiike 72'	J. League	Carlos 49'	Attendance: 14,713; Referee: Kiyoshi Ōta; Assistant referees: Takeshi Ōkura, Yasushi Tsuchimoto; Fourth official: Takuji Fukazawa

26 May 1993 1st-4	Gamba Osaka	1–1 (a.s.d.e.t.) (6–7 p)	Shimizu S-Pulse	Expo '70 Commemorative Stadium
18:59 JST (UTC+09)	Nagashima 39'	J. League	Edu 67'	Attendance: 16,707; Referee: Martin Bodenham; Assistant referees: Kōetsu Kikuchi, Yasuhiro Hemmi; Fourth official: Tsuyoshi Miyake
	Penalties
	(penalty scored) Müller; (penalty scored) Flavio; (penalty scored) Nagashima; (penalty missed) Kudaka; (penalty scored) Wada; (penalty missed) Kōji Kondō; (penalty scored) Uemura; (penalty scored) Matsuyama; (penalty missed) Azuma		(penalty scored) Toninho; (penalty scored) Hasegawa; (penalty scored) Marco Antonio; (penalty missed) Ōenoki; (penalty scored) Sugimoto; (penalty missed) Horiike; (penalty scored) Sawanobori; (penalty scored) Naitō; (penalty scored) Hiraoka

29 May 1993 1st-5	Shimizu S-Pulse	0–0 (a.s.d.e.t.) (5–6 p)	Nagoya Grampus Eight	Tokyo National Stadium
18:59 JST (UTC+09)		J. League		Attendance: 50,475; Referee: Masahiro Sogawa; Assistant referees: Keiichi Sunakawa, Takeshi Ōkura; Fourth official: Takuji Fukazawa
	Penalties
	(penalty missed) Toninho; (penalty scored) Hasegawa; (penalty missed) Marco Antonio; (penalty scored) Ōenoki; (penalty scored) Sawanobori; (penalty scored) Ōta; (penalty scored) Hiraoka; (penalty missed) Naitō		(penalty scored) Fujikawa; (penalty missed) Iijima; (penalty scored) Lineker; (penalty scored) Gotō; (penalty missed) Yonekura; (penalty scored) Asano; (penalty scored) Nakanishi; (penalty scored) Tsuruta

2 June 1993 1st-6	Shimizu S-Pulse	2–4	Verdy Kawasaki	Kusanagi Athletic Stadium
16:02 JST (UTC+09)	Edu 67'; Aoshima 87'	J. League	Hashiratani 48'; Takeda 65'; Kitazawa 71'; Miura 89'	Attendance: 18,113; Referee: Martin Bodenham; Assistant referees: Fumikazu Shioyazono, Kazunori Okada; Fourth official: Teruhito Kudō

5 June 1993 1st-7	JEF United Ichihara	1–2 (a.s.d.e.t.)	Shimizu S-Pulse	Ichihara Stadium
18:31 JST (UTC+09)	Ejiri 35'	J. League	Edu 43'; Hasegawa 116'	Attendance: 9,427; Referee: Kenji Tanaka; Assistant referees: Hiroshi Fukuda, Masato Nogami; Fourth official: Katsuhiko Takayama

9 June 1993 1st-8	Shimizu S-Pulse	1–2	Yokohama Marinos	Nihondaira Sports Stadium
19:00 JST (UTC+09)	Sawanobori 53'	J. League	Yamada 35', 41'	Attendance: 9,464; Referee: Fumikazu Shioyazono; Assistant referees: Kimio Izaki, Yoshimi Ogawa; Fourth official: Masami Urayama

12 June 1993 1st-9	Urawa Red Diamonds	2–1	Shimizu S-Pulse	Urawa Komaba Stadium
18:34 JST (UTC+09)	Fukuda 61' (pen.); Mizuuchi 66'	J. League	Aoshima 34'	Attendance: 9,590; Referee: Tetsuya Hamana; Assistant referees: Mitsuru Satō, Hisashi Uemura; Fourth official: Morihiko Yamaji

16 June 1993 1st-10	Sanfrecce Hiroshima	0–3	Shimizu S-Pulse	Hiroshima Stadium
19:01 JST (UTC+09)		J. League	Aoshima 7'; Ōenoki 41'; Hasegawa 47'	Attendance: 13,923; Referee: Martin Bodenham; Assistant referees: Kōetsu Kikuchi, Sōichirō Kaneko; Fourth official: Kōji Ueno

19 June 1993 1st-11	Shimizu S-Pulse	1–0	Yokohama Flügels	Nihondaira Sports Stadium
19:01 JST (UTC+09)	Sawanobori 21'	J. League		Attendance: 8,726; Referee: Shizuo Takada; Assistant referees: Takashi Kunori, Yoshimi Ogawa; Fourth official: Takuji Fukazawa

23 June 1993 1st-12	Shimizu S-Pulse	3–2	Gamba Osaka	Kusanagi Athletic Stadium
19:01 JST (UTC+09)	Edu 23', 84'; Mukōjima 68'	J. League	Flavio 34', 71'	Attendance: 15,703; Referee: Hideo Kikuchi; Assistant referees: Kazunori Okada, Yoshio Sawada; Fourth official: Teruhito Kudō

26 June 1993 1st-13	Nagoya Grampus Eight	3–1	Shimizu S-Pulse	Gifu Nagaragawa Stadium
15:04 JST (UTC+09)	Tsuruta 63'; Sawairi 85'; Gotō 89'	J. League	Hasegawa 15'	Attendance: 29,102; Referee: Hiroyuki Umemoto; Assistant referees: Yoshikazu Hiroshima, Yasushi Tsuchimoto; Fourth official: Takayoshi Kashino

30 June 1993 1st-14	Verdy Kawasaki	1–1 (a.s.d.e.t.) (4–2 p)	Shimizu S-Pulse	Kawasaki Todoroki Stadium
19:02 JST (UTC+09)	Nagai 12'	J. League	48' (o.g.)	Attendance: 10,067; Referee: Fumikazu Shioyazono; Assistant referees: Naotsugu Fuse, Kimio Izaki; Fourth official: Hideaki Kobayashi
	Penalties
	(penalty scored) Hashiratani; (penalty scored) Miura; (penalty scored) Pereira; (penalty scored) Ishikawa		(penalty missed) Edu; (penalty scored) Hasegawa; (penalty missed) Ōenoki; (penalty scored) Sanada

3 July 1993 1st-15	Shimizu S-Pulse	4–1	JEF United Ichihara	Nihondaira Sports Stadium
18:59 JST (UTC+09)	Hasegawa 12', 89'; Mukōjima 18'; Ōenoki 69'	J. League	Makino 74'	Attendance: 9,290; Referee: Shinichirō Obata; Assistant referees: Kazuya Yanagisawa, Yoshio Sawada; Fourth official: Masami Urayama

7 July 1993 1st-16	Yokohama Marinos	3–1	Shimizu S-Pulse	Yokohama Mitsuzawa Football Stadium
19:02 JST (UTC+09)	Bisconti 31'; Díaz 60', 79'	J. League	Hasegawa 66'	Attendance: 12,199; Referee: Hitoshi Yamada; Assistant referees: Mitsuru Satō, Keiichi Sunakawa; Fourth official: Haruo Suzuki

10 July 1993 1st-17	Shimizu S-Pulse	0–0 (a.s.d.e.t.) (6–5 p)	Urawa Red Diamonds	Nihondaira Sports Stadium
18:59 JST (UTC+09)		J. League		Attendance: 9,448; Referee: Fumikazu Shioyazono; Assistant referees: Morihisa Yamaguchi, Yasushi Tsuchimoto; Fourth official: Takuji Fukazawa
	Penalties
	(penalty scored) Sanada; (penalty missed) Hasegawa; (penalty missed) Saitō; (penalty scored) Ōta; (penalty scored) Miura; (penalty scored) Horiike; (penalty scored) Sawanobori; (penalty scored) Mukōjima		(penalty scored) Hirose; (penalty scored) Mochizuki; (penalty missed) Matsumoto; (penalty missed) Trivisonno; (penalty scored) Tanaka; (penalty scored) E. Satō; (penalty scored) Nishino; (penalty missed) Imakura

14 July 1993 1st-18	Kashima Antlers	1–2	Shimizu S-Pulse	Kashima Soccer Stadium
19:03 JST (UTC+09)	Hasegawa 68'	J. League	Edu 61'; Tajima 84'	Attendance: 14,673; Referee: Martin Bodenham; Assistant referees: Kōetsu Kikuchi, Masato Nogami; Fourth official: Ryūichi Mogi

==== NICOS series ====
24 July 1993 2nd-1	JEF United Ichihara	1–0	Shimizu S-Pulse	Ichihara Stadium
16:02 JST (UTC+09)	Echigo 76'	J. League		Attendance: 9,358; Referee: Tatsumi Ōno; Assistant referees: Masayoshi Okada, Naotsugu Fuse; Fourth official: Makoto Numajiri

31 July 1993 2nd-2	Shimizu S-Pulse	2–1 (a.s.d.e.t.)	Sanfrecce Hiroshima	Nihondaira Sports Stadium
18:29 JST (UTC+09)	Mukōjima 80'; Hasegawa 92'	J. League	Vonderburg 9'	Attendance: 8,991; Referee: Masayoshi Okada; Assistant referees: Yoshio Sawada, Yoshimi Ogawa; Fourth official: Takuji Fukazawa

4 August 1993 2nd-3	Yokohama Marinos	0–4	Shimizu S-Pulse	Yokohama Mitsuzawa Football Stadium
19:01 JST (UTC+09)		J. League	Edu 35', 85'; Sawanobori 44'; Mukōjima 46'	Attendance: 13,146; Referee: Shizuo Takada; Assistant referees: Tatsumi Ōno, Takashi Kunori; Fourth official: Akira Sanpei

7 August 1993 2nd-4	Yokohama Flügels	0–1 (a.s.d.e.t.)	Shimizu S-Pulse	Kumamoto Suizenji Stadium
19:00 JST (UTC+09)		J. League	Tajima 112'	Attendance: 13,133; Referee: Hideo Kikuchi; Assistant referees: Toyohide Kanda, Hideaki Harada; Fourth official: Tōru Yamashiro

14 August 1993 2nd-5	Nagoya Grampus Eight	0–1 (a.s.d.e.t.)	Shimizu S-Pulse	Gifu Nagaragawa Stadium
19:04 JST (UTC+09)		J. League	Tajima 94'	Attendance: 25,301; Referee: Kenji Tanaka; Assistant referees: Yasuhiro Hemmi, Yoshio Sawada; Fourth official: Takayoshi Kashino

20 August 1993 2nd-6	Kashima Antlers	0–1	Shimizu S-Pulse	Kashima Soccer Stadium
19:01 JST (UTC+09)		J. League	Mukōjima 32'	Attendance: 13,938; Referee: Kiichirō Tachi; Assistant referees: Toshiyuki Mayuzumi, Masato Nogami; Fourth official: Ichirō Inukai

25 August 1993 2nd-7	Shimizu S-Pulse	3–0	Urawa Red Diamonds	Nihondaira Sports Stadium
18:59 JST (UTC+09)	Sawanobori 53'; Edu 67', 69'	J. League		Attendance: 8,699; Referee: Masayoshi Okada; Assistant referees: Yoshimi Ogawa, Yasushi Tsuchimoto; Fourth official: Masami Urayama

28 August 1993 2nd-8	Verdy Kawasaki	0–0 (a.s.d.e.t.) (2–3 p)	Shimizu S-Pulse	Iwate Morioka Stadium
15:02 JST (UTC+09)		J. League		Attendance: 28,625; Referee: Kōetsu Kikuchi; Assistant referees: Keiichi Sunakawa, Kimio Izaki; Fourth official: Fumiaki Kikuchi
	Penalties
	(penalty missed) Miura; (penalty missed) Kitazawa; (penalty scored) Bismarck; (penalty scored) Kikuhara; (penalty missed) Ishikawa		(penalty scored) Gomes; (penalty missed) Hasegawa; (penalty scored) Sawanobori; (penalty scored) Miura

3 September 1993 2nd-9	Shimizu S-Pulse	3–2	Gamba Osaka	Nihondaira Sports Stadium
19:00 JST (UTC+09)	Sawanobori 43', 49'; Mukōjima 89'	J. League	Isogai 53'; Flavio 61'	Attendance: 9,005; Referee: Shizuo Takada; Assistant referees: Kimio Izaki, Yoshimi Ogawa; Fourth official: Takuji Fukazawa

6 November 1993 2nd-10	Sanfrecce Hiroshima	0–0 (a.s.d.e.t.) (4–5 p)	Shimizu S-Pulse	Bingo Stadium
14:02 JST (UTC+09)		J. League		Attendance: 10,199; Referee: Hideo Kikuchi; Assistant referees: Yoshitsugu Katayama, Masanori Watanabe; Fourth official: Hiroshi Saeki
	Penalties
	(penalty scored) Kazama; (penalty scored) Matsuda; (penalty scored) Moriyama; (penalty scored) Moriyasu; (penalty missed) Katanosaka		(penalty scored) Sugimoto; (penalty scored) Miura; (penalty scored) Ōta; (penalty scored) Sawanobori; (penalty scored) Hiraoka

10 November 1993 2nd-11	Shimizu S-Pulse	1–1 (a.s.d.e.t.) (3–4 p)	JEF United Ichihara	Kusanagi Athletic Stadium
19:02 JST (UTC+09)	Hasegawa 25'	J. League	Nakanishi 50'	Attendance: 17,540; Referee: Yoshimi Ogawa; Assistant referees: Yoshio Sawada, Kōetsu Kikuchi; Fourth official: Teruhito Kudō
	Penalties
	(penalty scored) Ōta; (penalty scored) Sawanobori; (penalty missed) Miura; (penalty scored) Sugimoto; (penalty missed) Naitō		(penalty missed) Otze; (penalty scored) Pavel; (penalty scored) Kageyama; (penalty scored) Manaka; (penalty scored) Ejiri

13 November 1993 2nd-12	Shimizu S-Pulse	3–1	Yokohama Flügels	Kusanagi Athletic Stadium
15:31 JST (UTC+09)	Mukōjima 31', 69'; Miura 79'	J. League	Amarilla 44'	Attendance: 16,080; Referee: Shinichirō Obata; Assistant referees: Morihisa Yamaguchi, Yasushi Tsuchimoto; Fourth official: Masami Urayama

17 November 1993 2nd-13	Shimizu S-Pulse	2–0	Nagoya Grampus Eight	Kusanagi Athletic Stadium
19:00 JST (UTC+09)	Edu 29'; Hasegawa 34'	J. League		Attendance: 16,889; Referee: Fumikazu Shioyazono; Assistant referees: Toyohide Kanda, Yoshimi Ogawa; Fourth official: Teruhito Kudō

20 November 1993 2nd-14	Shimizu S-Pulse	0–2	Kashima Antlers	Nihondaira Sports Stadium
15:00 JST (UTC+09)		J. League	Kurosaki 47', 80'	Attendance: 9,231; Referee: Juan Carlos Crespi; Assistant referees: Tatsumi Ōno, Kimio Izaki; Fourth official: Masami Urayama

27 November 1993 2nd-15	Urawa Red Diamonds	0–2	Shimizu S-Pulse	Tokyo National Stadium
15:01 JST (UTC+09)		J. League	Sawanobori 22'; Edu 42'	Attendance: 50,348; Referee: Hideo Kikuchi; Assistant referees: Naotsugu Fuse, Takashi Kunori; Fourth official: Morihiko Yamaji

1 December 1993 2nd-16	Shimizu S-Pulse	0–1	Verdy Kawasaki	Tokyo National Stadium
19:04 JST (UTC+09)		J. League	Takeda 26'	Attendance: 51,825; Referee: Kōetsu Kikuchi; Assistant referees: Keiichi Sunakawa, Noboru Ishiyama; Fourth official: Takuji Fukazawa

8 December 1993 2nd-17	Gamba Osaka	0–2	Shimizu S-Pulse	Expo '70 Commemorative Stadium
19:01 JST (UTC+09)		J. League	Iwashita 28'; Hasegawa 34'	Attendance: 21,207; Referee: Yōtarō Moritsu; Assistant referees: Morihisa Yamaguchi, Kazuya Yanagisawa; Fourth official: Sōichirō Kaneko

15 December 1993 2nd-18	Shimizu S-Pulse	1–0	Yokohama Marinos	Tokyo National Stadium
19:03 JST (UTC+09)	Ōenoki 55'	J. League		Attendance: 48,937; Referee: Masayoshi Okada; Assistant referees: Kimio Izaki, Naotsugu Fuse; Fourth official: Takuji Fukazawa

=== Emperor's Cup ===
5 December 1993 1st Round	Sapporo University	0–6	Shimizu S-Pulse	Fuji Stadium
13:02 JST (UTC+09)			Edu ?', ?'; Sugimoto ?'; Sawanobori ?'; T. Itō ?'; Marco ?'

11 December 1993 2nd Round	Chuo University	0–1	Shimizu S-Pulse	Nihondaira Sports Stadium
13:00 JST (UTC+09)			Ōenoki ?'

19 December 1993 Quarterfinals	JEF United Ichihara	1–2 (a.e.t.)	Shimizu S-Pulse	Ehime Matsuyama Athletic Stadium
13:00 JST (UTC+09)	Pavel ?'		Sawanobori ?'; Hasegawa ?'

23 December 1993 Semifinals	Kashima Antlers	1–0	Shimizu S-Pulse	Tokyo National Stadium
13:09 JST (UTC+09)	Akita 69'

=== J.League Cup ===
10 September 1993 GL-B-1	Shimizu S-Pulse	2–1	Nagoya Grampus Eight	Kusanagi Athletic Stadium
19:01 JST (UTC+09)	Marco Antonio 44'; Edu 75'	J. League	Lineker 76'	Attendance: 17,932; Referee: Shizuo Takada; Assistant referees: Hisashi Uemura, Yoshimi Ogawa; Fourth official: Teruhito Kudō

GL-B-2	bye

18 September 1993 GL-B-3	Yokohama Marinos	1–5	Shimizu S-Pulse	Yokohama Mitsuzawa Football Stadium
18:30 JST (UTC+09)	Everton 53'	J. League	Mukōjima 18'; Sugimoto 27'; Edu 47'; Iwashita 61', 69'	Attendance: 13,769; Referee: Kōetsu Kikuchi; Assistant referees: Keiichi Sunakawa, Kazuaki Hamaguchi; Fourth official: Tōru Kamikawa

25 September 1993 GL-B-4	Shimizu S-Pulse	3–2	Urawa Red Diamonds	Sapporo Atsubetsu Stadium
14:03 JST (UTC+09)	Iwashita 34' (pen.), 53'; Marco Antonio 44'	J. League	Rummenigge 60' (pen.), 77'	Attendance: 20,237; Referee: Juan Carlos Crespi; Assistant referees: Fumikazu Shioyazono, Kimio Izaki; Fourth official: Kenichi Koshiyama

2 October 1993 GL-B-5	Yokohama Flügels	2–1 (a.s.d.e.t.)	Shimizu S-Pulse	Tokyo National Stadium
18:32 JST (UTC+09)	Sorimachi 41'; Yamaguchi 109'	J. League	Iwashita 57'	Attendance: 50,222; Referee: Hideo Kikuchi; Assistant referees: Keiichi Sunakawa, Kimio Izaki; Fourth official: Susumu Takeda

GL-B-6	bye

16 October 1993 GL-B-7	Shimizu S-Pulse	2–0	Júbilo Iwata	Nihondaira Sports Stadium
18:29 JST (UTC+09)	Sugimoto 30'; Naitō 40'	J. League		Attendance: 9,270; Referee: Hiroyuki Umemoto; Assistant referees: Kazuya Yanagisawa, Yoshio Sawada; Fourth official: Takuji Fukazawa

23 October 1993 Semifinals	Gamba Osaka	2–4	Shimizu S-Pulse	Expo '70 Commemorative Stadium
15:00 JST (UTC+09)	Nagashima 27', 86'	J. League	Tajima 19'; Ōenoki 35', 75'; Edu 70'	Attendance: 20,497; Referee: Masayoshi Okada; Assistant referees: Morihisa Yamaguchi, Hiroyuki Umemoto; Fourth official: Yoshitsugu Katayama

23 November 1993 Final	Verdy Kawasaki	2–1	Shimizu S-Pulse	Tokyo National Stadium
13:03 JST (UTC+09)	Bismarck 73'; Kitazawa 85'	J. League	Ōenoki 13'	Attendance: 53,677; Referee: Juan Carlos Crespi; Assistant referees: Fumikazu Shioyazono, Kōetsu Kikuchi; Fourth official: Keiichi Sunakawa

== Player statistics ==
Pos.	Nat.	Player	D.o.B. (Age)	Height / Weight	J.League		Emperor's Cup		J.League Cup		Total	
Pos.	Nat.	Player	D.o.B. (Age)	Height / Weight	Apps	Goals	Apps	Goals	Apps	Goals	Apps	Goals
GK	(Japan)	Kiyotaka Matsui	January 4, 1961 (aged 32)	180 cm / 83 kg	0	0		0	0	0		0
DF	(Brazil)	Marco Antonio	August 20, 1963 (aged 29)	190 cm / 83 kg	18	0	4	1	7	2	29	3
FW	(Brazil)	Toninho	March 23, 1965 (aged 28)	186 cm / 79 kg	6	3	0	0	0	0	6	3
MF	(Japan)	Katsumi Ōenoki	April 3, 1965 (aged 28)	178 cm / 71 kg	35	3	4	1	4	3	43	7
DF	(Japan)	Yasutoshi Miura	July 15, 1965 (aged 27)	171 cm / 66 kg	19	1	4	0	4	0	27	1
DF	(Japan)	Takumi Horiike	September 6, 1965 (aged 27)	173 cm / 67 kg	36	1	4	0	1	0	41	1
FW	(Japan)	Kenta Hasegawa	September 25, 1965 (aged 27)	177 cm / 77 kg	36	10	4	1	1	0	41	11
FW	(Japan)	Tatsuru Mukōjima	January 9, 1966 (aged 27)	161 cm / 54 kg	30	8	0	0	4	1	34	9
MF	(Brazil)	Edu	February 2, 1967 (aged 26)	184 cm / 79 kg	32	13	2	2	5	3	39	18
MF	(Japan)	Masao Sugimoto	June 26, 1967 (aged 25)	167 cm / 64 kg	22	0	4	1	6	2	32	3
DF	(Japan)	Yasuhiro Yamada	February 13, 1968 (aged 25)	174 cm / 74 kg	3	0	0	0	6	0	9	0
GK	(Japan)	Masanori Sanada	March 6, 1968 (aged 25)	178 cm / 73 kg	19	0	0	0	1	0	20	0
MF	(Brazil)	Santos	March 28, 1968 (aged 25)	174 cm / 68 kg	2	0	0	0	0	0	2	0
DF	(Japan)	Shinichirō Katō	April 17, 1968 (aged 25)	173 cm / 66 kg	0	0		0	0	0		0
DF	(Japan)	Naoki Naitō	May 30, 1968 (aged 24)	181 cm / 79 kg	26	0	1	0	7	1	34	1
FW	(Japan)	Fumiaki Aoshima	July 12, 1968 (aged 24)	178 cm / 75 kg	6	3	0	0	3	0	9	3
DF	(Japan)	Takahiro Natsuga	February 27, 1969 (aged 24)	177 cm / 76 kg	0	0		0	0	0		0
DF	(Japan)	Sōichi Shimane	May 28, 1969 (aged 23)	177 cm / 72 kg	0	0		0	0	0		0
GK	(Japan)	Katsumi Ōtaki	June 9, 1969 (aged 23)	184 cm / 72 kg	0	0		0	0	0		0
DF	(Japan)	Hiroaki Hiraoka	September 2, 1969 (aged 23)	180 cm / 70 kg	25	0	4	0	7	0	36	0
MF	(Japan)	Nobuhide Iwashina	December 11, 1969 (aged 23)	165 cm / 66 kg	0	0		0	0	0		0
MF	(Japan)	Masaaki Sawanobori	January 12, 1970 (aged 23)	170 cm / 66 kg	35	7	4	2	1	0	40	9
MF	(Japan)	Takamitsu Ōta	July 19, 1970 (aged 22)	172 cm / 63 kg	21	0	1	0	6	0	28	0
DF	(Japan)	Shōichi Tanaka	July 24, 1970 (aged 22)	173 cm / 73 kg	0	0		0	0	0		0
GK	(Japan)	Kōji Nakahara	July 27, 1970 (aged 22)	178 cm / 78 kg	0	0		0	0	0		0
MF	(Japan)	Osamu Takada	July 28, 1970 (aged 22)	172 cm / 68 kg	0	0		0	0	0		0
MF	(Japan)	Nobuyuki Takada	August 11, 1970 (aged 22)	173 cm / 63 kg	0	0		0	0	0		0
MF	(Japan)	Kazuhiro Kawasumi	October 5, 1970 (aged 22)	178 cm / 67 kg	0	0		0	0	0		0
DF	(Japan)	Hiroshi Saitō	November 13, 1970 (aged 22)	178 cm / 68 kg	15	0	0	0	0	0	15	0
DF	(Japan)	Kiyoshi Nakamura	May 20, 1971 (aged 21)	176 cm / 69 kg	0	0		0	0	0		0
MF	(Japan)	Junichi Tsuruta	September 28, 1971 (aged 21)	160 cm / 53 kg	0	0		0	0	0		0
MF	(Japan)	Kenji Tanaka	October 10, 1971 (aged 21)	170 cm / 68 kg	0	0		0	0	0		0
FW	(Japan)	Shinya Matsubara	November 3, 1971 (aged 21)	177 cm / 70 kg	0	0		0	0	0		0
DF	(Japan)	Yōsuke Mizoi	December 21, 1971 (aged 21)	172 cm / 67 kg	0	0		0	0	0		0
FW	(Japan)	Jun Iwashita	April 8, 1973 (aged 20)	173 cm / 69 kg	5	1	0	0	4	5	9	6
MF	(Japan)	Noriaki Asakura	May 11, 1973 (aged 20)	174 cm / 70 kg	2	0	0	0	5	0	7	0
DF	(Japan)	Masaharu Kotani	June 21, 1973 (aged 19)	183 cm / 83 kg	0	0		0	0	0		0
FW	(Japan)	Yuzuki Itō	April 7, 1974 (aged 19)	173 cm / 65 kg	0	0		0	0	0		0
DF	(Japan)	Hiroyuki Shirai	June 17, 1974 (aged 18)	180 cm / 72 kg	0	0	0	0	1	0	1	0
FW	(Japan)	Hiroaki Tajima	June 27, 1974 (aged 18)	173 cm / 65 kg	8	3	2	0	6	1	16	4
MF	(Japan)	Teruyoshi Itō	August 31, 1974 (aged 18)	168 cm / 71 kg	0	0	3	1	0	0	3	1
FW	(Japan)	Ryūji Okada	September 6, 1974 (aged 18)	170 cm / 58 kg	0	0		0	1	0		0
DF	(Japan)	Manabu Mochizuki	March 14, 1975 (aged 18)	171 cm / 68 kg	0	0		0	0	0		0
DF	(Japan)	Hisashi Katō †	April 24, 1956 (aged 37)	174 cm / 70 kg	14	0	3	0	1	0	18	0
DF	(Brazil)	Gomes †	September 2, 1964 (aged 28)	184 cm / 77 kg	8	0	0	0	0	0	8	0
GK	(Brazil)	Sidmar †	June 13, 1962 (aged 30)	cm / - kg	17	0	4	0	6	0	27	0
FW	(Brazil)	Marcão †	March 16, 1969 (aged 24)	cm / - kg	2	0	0	0	0	0	2	0

- † player(s) joined the team after the opening of this season.

== Transfers ==
In:

No.	Pos.	Nation	Player
—	GK	JPN	Kōji Nakahara (from Chuo University)
—	DF	JPN	Hiroshi Saitō (from XV de Jaú)
—	MF	JPN	Masao Sugimoto (from Yamaha)
—	MF	BRA	Edu (from Corinthians)
—	DF	JPN	Shinichirō Katō (from NKK)
—	DF	JPN	Shōichi Tanaka (from Kokushikan University)
—	DF	JPN	Manabu Mochizuki (from Shizuoka Gakuen Senior High School)
—	DF	JPN	Hiroyuki Shirai (from Tokai University Daiichi Senior High School)
—	MF	JPN	Kazuhiro Kawasumi (from University of Tsukuba)
—	MF	JPN	Teruyoshi Itō (from Tokai University Daiichi Senior High School)
—	FW	JPN	Yuzuki Itō (from Shizuoka Kita High School)
—	FW	JPN	Ryūji Okada (from Shizuoka Kita High School)
—	FW	JPN	Hiroaki Tajima (from Shimizu Higashi High School)

Out:

No.	Pos.	Nation	Player
—	MF		Yasushi Kawakami
—	FW	BRA	Mirandinha (to Fujita)
—	FW	BRA	Gerson Antonio Porto
—	GK	JPN	Naruchika Ariwara
—	MF	JPN	Akira Saitō
—	FW	JPN	Manabu Sugiyama
—	FW	JPN	Yukihiro Imaizumi

== Transfers during the season ==
=== In ===
- (Japan) Hisashi Katō (from Verdy Kawasaki on July)
- (Brazil) Gomes (from Atlético on July)
- (Brazil) Sidmar (from XV de Piracicaba on July)
- (Brazil) Marcão (on November)

=== Out ===
- (Brazil) Marco Antonio (in January 1994)

== Awards ==
- J.League Rookie of the Year: (Japan) Masaaki Sawanobori
- J.League Best XI: (Japan) Takumi Horiike

== Other pages ==
- (in Japanese) J. League official site
- (in Japanese) Shimizu S-Pulse official site
