= 1994 Shimizu S-Pulse season =

Shimizu S-Pulse
1994 season
- Manager: Leão; Rivellino (July 1994)
- Stadium: Nihondaira Sports Stadium
- J.League: 4th
- Emperor's Cup: 1st Round
- J.League Cup: Quarterfinals
- Top goalscorer: League: Toninho (22); All: Toninho (22)
- Highest home attendance: 10,361 (vs Sanfrecce Hiroshima, 4 June 1994); 52,218 (vs Kashima Antlers, 4 May 1994, Tokyo National Stadium)
- Lowest home attendance: 9,652 (vs Nagoya Grampus Eight, 16 April 1994)
- Average home league attendance: 19,726
Home colours	Away colours

The 1994 season was Shimizu S-Pulse's third season in existence and their second season in the J1 League. The club also competed in the Emperor's Cup and the J.League Cup. The team finished the season fourth in the league.

== Review and events ==
=== League results summary ===
Overall								Home						Away					
Pld	W	D	L	GF	GA	GD	Pts	W	D	L	GF	GA	GD	W	D	L	GF	GA	GD
44	27	0	17	69	56	+13	81	14	0	8	40	30	+10	13	0	9	29	26	+3

Source: J.LEAGUE OFFICIAL 1995 RECORD & DATA. ISBN 4-09-102317-7.

=== League results by round ===
J.League Suntory series (first stage)
Round	1	2	3	4	5	6	7	8	9	10	11	12	13	14	15	16	17	18	19	20	21	22
Ground	H	A	H	A	H	A	H	H	A	H	A	H	A	H	A	H	A	A	H	A	H	A
Result	W	W	W	L	W	W	W	W	W	W	W	W	W	L	L	L	L	W	L	W	W	W
Position	5	2	1	3	3	2	1	1	1	1	1	1	1	1	1	2	2	2	2	2	2	2

Source: J.LEAGUE OFFICIAL 1995 RECORD & DATA. ISBN 4-09-102317-7.
A = Away; H = Home; W = Win; D = Draw; L = Loss

J.League NICOS series (second stage)
Round	1	2	3	4	5	6	7	8	9	10	11	12	13	14	15	16	17	18	19	20	21	22
Ground	H	A	H	A	H	A	H	H	A	H	A	H	A	H	A	H	A	A	H	A	H	A
Result	L	L	W	W	L	W	L	L	W	W	L	W	L	W	L	L	L	L	W	W	W	W
Position	11	12	10	8	9	8	8	9	8	6	8	6	8	6	6	8	8	11	8	8	6	6

Source: J.LEAGUE OFFICIAL 1995 RECORD & DATA. ISBN 4-09-102317-7.
A = Away; H = Home; W = Win; D = Draw; L = Loss

== Competitions ==
Competitions	Position
J.League	4th / 12 clubs
Emperor's Cup	1st round
J.League Cup	Quarterfinals

== Domestic results ==
=== J.League ===
==== Suntory series ====
12 March 1994 1st-1	Shimizu S-Pulse	1–0	Yokohama Flügels	Nihondaira Sports Stadium
14:59 JST (UTC+09)	Nagashima 88'	J. League		Attendance: 10,071; Referee: Yōtarō Moritsu; Assistant referees: Kazuo Kakihana, Yasushi Tsuchimoto; Fourth official: Takuji Fukazawa; Man of the Match: Akihiro Nagashima

16 March 1994 1st-2	Urawa Red Diamonds	0–2	Shimizu S-Pulse	Urawa Komaba Stadium
19:00 JST (UTC+09)		J. League	Sawanobori 14'; Hasegawa 21'	Attendance: 9,290; Referee: Masahiro Sogawa; Assistant referees: Toshiyuki Mayuzumi, Kazuaki Hamaguchi; Fourth official: Izumi Okada; Man of the Match: Masaaki Sawanobori

19 March 1994 1st-3	Shimizu S-Pulse	4–1	Bellmare Hiratsuka	Nihondaira Sports Stadium
15:02 JST (UTC+09)	Sawanobori 9', 72'; Ronaldo 11'; Mukōjima 61'	J. League	Betinho 54'	Attendance: 10,285; Referee: Hiroyuki Umemoto; Assistant referees: Yū Nakamura, Takashi Kunori; Fourth official: Masakazu Hōjō; Man of the Match: Ronaldo

23 March 1994 1st-4	Kashima Antlers	3–2 (V-goal) (a.e.t.)	Shimizu S-Pulse	Kashima Soccer Stadium
19:03 JST (UTC+09)	Hasegawa 42' 111'; Kurosaki 85'	J. League	Toninho 5'; Horiike 9'	Attendance: 13,808; Referee: Tatsumi Ōno; Assistant referees: Yū Nakamura, Mitsuru Satō; Fourth official: Ichirō Inukai

26 March 1994 1st-5	Shimizu S-Pulse	2–1	Verdy Kawasaki	Kusanagi Athletic Stadium
19:04 JST (UTC+09)	Nagashima 15'; Toninho 41'	J. League	Bismarck 75'	Attendance: 18,239; Referee: Bengt Borjesson; Assistant referees: Yoshimi Ogawa, Naotsugu Fuse; Fourth official: Teruhito Kudō; Man of the Match: Yasutoshi Miura

2 April 1994 1st-6	Yokohama Marinos	0–1	Shimizu S-Pulse	Yokohama Mitsuzawa Football Stadium
19:06 JST (UTC+09)		J. League	Mukōjima 10'	Attendance: 14,337; Referee: Kenji Tanaka; Assistant referees: Yū Nakamura, Keiichi Sunakawa; Fourth official: Hideo Teranishi; Man of the Match: Tatsuru Mukōjima

6 April 1994 1st-7	Shimizu S-Pulse	1–0 (V-goal) (a.e.t.)	Júbilo Iwata	Kusanagi Athletic Stadium
19:05 JST (UTC+09)	Toninho 95'	J. League		Attendance: 17,806; Referee: Zoran Petrović; Assistant referees: Yoshimi Ogawa, Yasuhiro Matsuzaki; Fourth official: Teruhito Kudō; Man of the Match: Hisashi Katō

9 April 1994 1st-8	Shimizu S-Pulse	3–0	JEF United Ichihara	Ehime Matsuyama Athletic Stadium
14:00 JST (UTC+09)	Nagashima 8'; Toninho 50', 83'	J. League		Attendance: 15,198; Referee: Yōtarō Moritsu; Assistant referees: Mitsuo Kadota, Satoru Kawano; Fourth official: Tatsuya Hyōdō; Man of the Match: Toninho

13 April 1994 1st-9	Sanfrecce Hiroshima	1–3	Shimizu S-Pulse	Hiroshima Big Arch
19:03 JST (UTC+09)	Černý 58' (pen.)	J. League	Toninho 18', 21'; Sawanobori 87'	Attendance: 10,308; Referee: Bengt Borjesson; Assistant referees: Kazuo Kakihana, Hiroshi Tanabe; Fourth official: Shinji Saga; Man of the Match: Toninho

16 April 1994 1st-10	Shimizu S-Pulse	2–1	Nagoya Grampus Eight	Nihondaira Sports Stadium
15:04 JST (UTC+09)	Horiike 46'; Toninho 55'	J. League	Jorginho 74'	Attendance: 9,652; Referee: Yoshimi Ogawa; Assistant referees: Yoshikazu Hiroshima, Kazuya Yanagisawa; Fourth official: Masakazu Hōjō; Man of the Match: Takumi Horiike

23 April 1994 1st-11	Gamba Osaka	0–2	Shimizu S-Pulse	Expo '70 Commemorative Stadium
15:02 JST (UTC+09)		J. League	Toninho 17'; Ōenoki 80'	Attendance: 19,303; Referee: Shinichirō Obata; Assistant referees: Sōichirō Kaneko, Toyohide Kanda; Fourth official: Tsuyoshi Miyake; Man of the Match: Katsumi Ōenoki

27 April 1994 1st-12	Shimizu S-Pulse	2–1 (V-goal) (a.e.t.)	Urawa Red Diamonds	Kusanagi Athletic Stadium
19:01 JST (UTC+09)	Nagashima 48'; Sawanobori 119'	J. League	Y. Satō 22'	Attendance: 17,789; Referee: Hideo Kikuchi; Assistant referees: Yasushi Tsuchimoto, Naoyuki Mori; Fourth official: Teruhito Kudō; Man of the Match: Masaaki Sawanobori

30 April 1994 1st-13	Bellmare Hiratsuka	0–1	Shimizu S-Pulse	Hiratsuka Stadium
15:03 JST (UTC+09)		J. League	Ōenoki 83'	Attendance: 15,540; Referee: Kōetsu Kikuchi; Assistant referees: Kazuaki Hamaguchi, Takashi Kunori; Fourth official: Yoshiharu Nakamura; Man of the Match: Katsumi Ōenoki

4 May 1994 1st-14	Shimizu S-Pulse	3–3 (V-goal) (a.e.t.) (3–4 p)	Kashima Antlers	Tokyo National Stadium
14:05 JST (UTC+09)	Toninho 61', 63'; Hasegawa 71'	J. League	Santos 4'; Alcindo 53', 89'	Attendance: 52,218; Referee: Zoran Petrović; Assistant referees: Hiroshi Fukuda, Masato Nogami; Fourth official: Takuji Fukazawa
	Penalties
	(penalty scored) Toninho; (penalty missed) Sawanobori; (penalty missed) Hasegawa; (penalty scored) Iwashita; (penalty scored) Ōenoki		(penalty scored) Alcindo; (penalty scored) Manaka; (penalty scored) Ōno; (penalty missed) Ōba; (penalty scored) Santos

7 May 1994 1st-15	Verdy Kawasaki	2–0	Shimizu S-Pulse	Kawasaki Todoroki Stadium
19:03 JST (UTC+09)	Hasebe 10'; Miura 22'	J. League		Attendance: 10,595; Referee: Masayoshi Okada; Assistant referees: Toshiyuki Mayuzumi, Kimio Izaki; Fourth official: Jōji Kashihara

14 May 1994 1st-16	Shimizu S-Pulse	0–3	Yokohama Marinos	Nihondaira Sports Stadium
19:02 JST (UTC+09)		J. League	Díaz 24', 73'; Medina Bello 56'	Attendance: 10,005; Referee: Tatsumi Ōno; Assistant referees: Yasushi Tsuchimoto, Naoyuki Mori; Fourth official: Teruhito Kudō

18 May 1994 1st-17	Júbilo Iwata	4–2	Shimizu S-Pulse	Júbilo Iwata Stadium
19:03 JST (UTC+09)	Vanenburg 27'; Fujita 58'; Schillaci 72', 86'	J. League	Ronaldo 10'; Nagashima 43'	Attendance: 14,756; Referee: Shizuo Takada; Assistant referees: Morihisa Yamaguchi, Yasuhiro Matsuzaki; Fourth official: Toshiaki Futamata

1 June 1994 1st-18	JEF United Ichihara	1–2 (V-goal) (a.e.t.)	Shimizu S-Pulse	Tokyo National Stadium
19:03 JST (UTC+09)	Jō 17'	J. League	Toninho 86'; Iwashita 108'	Attendance: 54,656; Referee: Kenji Tanaka; Assistant referees: Kazuaki Hamaguchi, Kimio Izaki; Fourth official: Morio Okamoto; Man of the Match: Jun Iwashita

4 June 1994 1st-19	Shimizu S-Pulse	1–2	Sanfrecce Hiroshima	Nihondaira Sports Stadium
19:01 JST (UTC+09)	Nagashima 82'	J. League	Takagi 49', 61'	Attendance: 10,361; Referee: Zoran Petrović; Assistant referees: Yū Nakamura, Sōichirō Kaneko; Fourth official: Masakazu Hōjō

8 June 1994 1st-20	Nagoya Grampus Eight	0–1 (V-goal) (a.e.t.)	Shimizu S-Pulse	Kobe Universiade Memorial Stadium
19:03 JST (UTC+09)		J. League	Toninho 113'	Attendance: 38,239; Referee: Shinichirō Obata; Assistant referees: Morihisa Yamaguchi, Toyohide Kanda; Fourth official: Yasuhiro Hemmi; Man of the Match: Toninho

11 June 1994 1st-21	Shimizu S-Pulse	4–1	Gamba Osaka	Nihondaira Sports Stadium
15:04 JST (UTC+09)	Toninho 13', 71' (pen.), 89'; Miura 57'	J. League	Kiyama 88'	Attendance: 10,351; Referee: Yōtarō Moritsu; Assistant referees: Kazuaki Hamaguchi, Takeshi Ōkura; Fourth official: Masakazu Hōjō; Man of the Match: Toninho

15 June 1994 1st-22	Yokohama Flügels	1–2	Shimizu S-Pulse	Toyama Stadium
19:03 JST (UTC+09)	Hattori 83'	J. League	Nagashima 54', 69'	Attendance: 26,972; Referee: Zoran Petrović; Assistant referees: Fumikazu Shioyazono, Kōji Taniuchi; Fourth official: Kinji Sakō; Man of the Match: Akihiro Nagashima

==== NICOS series ====
10 August 1994 2nd-1	Shimizu S-Pulse	0–3	Yokohama Flügels	Kusanagi Athletic Stadium
19:05 JST (UTC+09)		J. League	Maezono 11'; Válber 41', 77'	Attendance: 18,478; Referee: Masayoshi Okada; Assistant referees: Mitsuru Satō, Masato Nogami; Fourth official: Teruhito Kudō

13 August 1994 2nd-2	Urawa Red Diamonds	2–0	Shimizu S-Pulse	Omiya Football Stadium
18:30 JST (UTC+09)	Rummenigge 75'; Y. Satō 83'	J. League		Attendance: 9,488; Referee: Fumikazu Shioyazono; Assistant referees: Hitoshi Yamada, Takeshi Ōkura; Fourth official: Akio Hayashi

17 August 1994 2nd-3	Shimizu S-Pulse	1–0	Bellmare Hiratsuka	Sapporo Atsubetsu Stadium
14:03 JST (UTC+09)	Naitō 65'	J. League		Attendance: 18,214; Referee: Zoran Petrović; Assistant referees: Tetsu Karakida, Kenichi Koshiyama; Fourth official: Naoyuki Takahashi; Man of the Match: Naoki Naitō

20 August 1994 2nd-4	Kashima Antlers	1–2	Shimizu S-Pulse	Tokyo National Stadium
18:00 JST (UTC+09)	Alcindo 23'	J. League	26' (o.g.); Hasegawa 71'	Attendance: 50,724; Referee: Masayoshi Okada; Assistant referees: Hiroshi Fukuda, Kōji Taniuchi; Fourth official: Hide Lii; Man of the Match: Kenta Hasegawa

27 August 1994 2nd-5	Shimizu S-Pulse	1–2	Verdy Kawasaki	Kusanagi Athletic Stadium
19:05 JST (UTC+09)	Iwashita 89'	J. League	Bismarck 62'; Kitazawa 75'	Attendance: 19,034; Referee: Kenji Tanaka; Assistant referees: Yoshikazu Hiroshima, Sōichirō Kaneko; Fourth official: Masakazu Hōjō

31 August 1994 2nd-6	Yokohama Marinos	0–1	Shimizu S-Pulse	Tokyo National Stadium
19:04 JST (UTC+09)		J. League	Iwashita 52'	Attendance: 51,390; Referee: Zoran Petrović; Assistant referees: Noboru Ishiyama, Naotsugu Fuse; Fourth official: Kazuo Shirato; Man of the Match: Kenta Hasegawa

3 September 1994 2nd-7	Shimizu S-Pulse	0–1 (V-goal) (a.e.t.)	Júbilo Iwata	Kobe Universiade Memorial Stadium
19:02 JST (UTC+09)		J. League	Fujita 108'	Attendance: 37,306; Referee: Yoshitsugu Katayama; Assistant referees: Sōichirō Kaneko, Satoru Kawano; Fourth official: Toyohide Kanda

7 September 1994 2nd-8	Shimizu S-Pulse	1–1 (V-goal) (a.e.t.) (1–3 p)	JEF United Ichihara	Kusanagi Athletic Stadium
19:07 JST (UTC+09)	Miura 4'	J. League	Kageyama 88'	Attendance: 17,487; Referee: Shizuo Takada; Assistant referees: Tetsu Karakida, Kōji Taniuchi; Fourth official: Masakazu Hōjō
	Penalties
	(penalty scored) Toninho; (penalty missed) Horiike; (penalty missed) Hasegawa; (penalty missed) Ōta		(penalty scored) Ordenewitz; (penalty missed) Littbarski; (penalty scored) Jō; (penalty scored) Gotō

10 September 1994 2nd-9	Sanfrecce Hiroshima	0–1	Shimizu S-Pulse	Hiroshima Stadium
18:32 JST (UTC+09)		J. League	Toninho 43'	Attendance: 13,307; Referee: Hideo Kikuchi; Assistant referees: Naotsugu Fuse, Hideaki Harada; Fourth official: Norio Kuriyama; Man of the Match: Takumi Horiike

14 September 1994 2nd-10	Shimizu S-Pulse	2–1	Nagoya Grampus Eight	Hakatanomori Athletic Stadium
19:01 JST (UTC+09)	Toninho 2'; Ronaldo 9'	J. League	Mori 5'	Attendance: 20,077; Referee: Zoran Petrović; Assistant referees: Hiroshi Tanabe, Tōru Yamashiro; Fourth official: Hiroyuki Izumi; Man of the Match: Ronaldo

17 September 1994 2nd-11	Gamba Osaka	1–0	Shimizu S-Pulse	Expo '70 Commemorative Stadium
19:01 JST (UTC+09)	Isogai 38'	J. League		Attendance: 19,429; Referee: Kenji Tanaka; Assistant referees: Yoshikazu Hiroshima, Hideaki Harada; Fourth official: Akio Okutani

21 September 1994 2nd-12	Shimizu S-Pulse	5–4 (V-goal) (a.e.t.)	Urawa Red Diamonds	Kusanagi Athletic Stadium
19:02 JST (UTC+09)	Shirai 39'; Toninho 44', 74'; Djalminha 61' 97'	J. League	Lulu 12', 22', 80'; Rummenigge 16'	Attendance: 19,001; Referee: Yoshimi Ogawa; Assistant referees: Yoshikazu Hiroshima, Naoyuki Mori; Fourth official: Teruhito Kudō; Man of the Match: Djalminha

19 October 1994 2nd-13	Bellmare Hiratsuka	2–1	Shimizu S-Pulse	Hiratsuka Stadium
19:02 JST (UTC+09)	Noguchi 5'; Betinho 88'	J. League	Hasegawa 74'	Attendance: 15,200; Referee: Alberto Tejada; Assistant referees: Keiichi Sunakawa, Yasuhiro Matsuzaki; Fourth official: Michio Nakahara

22 October 1994 2nd-14	Shimizu S-Pulse	3–1	Kashima Antlers	Kusanagi Athletic Stadium
19:04 JST (UTC+09)	Hasegawa 26', 89'; Naitō 66'	J. League	Kurosaki 3'	Attendance: 18,160; Referee: Yoshitsugu Katayama; Assistant referees: Naoyuki Mori, Mikio Fukuoka; Fourth official: Kouzu (興津 純男); Man of the Match: Noriaki Asakura

26 October 1994 2nd-15	Verdy Kawasaki	5–1	Shimizu S-Pulse	Tokyo National Stadium
19:04 JST (UTC+09)	Ishikawa 7'; Ramos 16'; Bentinho 34'; Kitazawa 51', 74'	J. League	Djalminha 4'	Attendance: 51,166; Referee: Zoran Petrović; Assistant referees: Takeshi Ōkura, Yasuhiro Matsuzaki; Fourth official: Tōru Kamikawa

29 October 1994 2nd-16	Shimizu S-Pulse	1–3	Yokohama Marinos	Tokyo National Stadium
19:03 JST (UTC+09)	Hasegawa 11'	J. League	Díaz 7', 63'; Medina Bello 15'	Attendance: 48,157; Referee: Masayoshi Okada; Assistant referees: Hiroshi Fukuda, Masato Nogami; Fourth official: Yoshikazu Ozaki

2 November 1994 2nd-17	Júbilo Iwata	2–1	Shimizu S-Pulse	Júbilo Iwata Stadium
19:03 JST (UTC+09)	Schillaci 46', 57'	J. League	Toninho 86'	Attendance: 15,377; Referee: Kiyoshi Ōta; Assistant referees: Masahiro Katagiri, Tetsu Karakida; Fourth official: Takuya Okada

5 November 1994 2nd-18	JEF United Ichihara	1–0	Shimizu S-Pulse	Ichihara Stadium
15:03 JST (UTC+09)	Pavel 5'	J. League		Attendance: 14,331; Referee: Masahiro Sogawa; Assistant referees: Kazuaki Hamaguchi, Toshiyuki Mayuzumi; Fourth official: Tatsuya Sakata

9 November 1994 2nd-19	Shimizu S-Pulse	2–1	Sanfrecce Hiroshima	Kusanagi Athletic Stadium
19:01 JST (UTC+09)	Hasegawa 62'; Djalminha 80'	J. League	Černý 41'	Attendance: 19,002; Referee: Yoshitsugu Katayama; Assistant referees: Masahiro Katagiri, Takashi Kunori; Fourth official: Teruhito Kudō; Man of the Match: Yuzuki Itō

12 November 1994 2nd-20	Nagoya Grampus Eight	0–2	Shimizu S-Pulse	Gifu Nagaragawa Stadium
15:03 JST (UTC+09)		J. League	Hasegawa 22'; Sawanobori 89'	Attendance: 23,774; Referee: Tatsumi Ōno; Assistant referees: Hitoshi Yamada, Mikio Fukuoka; Fourth official: Tatsuo Gotō; Man of the Match: Kenta Hasegawa

16 November 1994 2nd-21	Shimizu S-Pulse	1–0	Gamba Osaka	Kusanagi Athletic Stadium
19:01 JST (UTC+09)	Iwashita 64'	J. League		Attendance: 17,090; Referee: Alberto Tejada; Assistant referees: Kazuo Kakihana, Kazuaki Hamaguchi; Fourth official: Masakazu Hōjō; Man of the Match: Hiroyuki Shirai

19 November 1994 2nd-22	Yokohama Flügels	0–2	Shimizu S-Pulse	Yokohama Mitsuzawa Football Stadium
15:02 JST (UTC+09)		J. League	Toninho 10'; Sawanobori 63'	Attendance: 13,714; Referee: Hideo Kikuchi; Assistant referees: Tetsuya Hamana, Tetsu Karakida; Fourth official: Toshiya Kumagai; Man of the Match: Takumi Horiike

=== Emperor's Cup ===
4 December 1994 1st Round	Shimizu S-Pulse	1–2	Kawasaki Steel	Yamaguchi Ishin Park Stadium
13:00 JST (UTC+09)	Hasegawa ?'		Tamura ?'; Takagi ?'

=== J.League Cup ===
1st Round	bye

30 July 1994 Quarterfinals	Shimizu S-Pulse	1–3	Yokohama Marinos	Tochigi Utsunomiya Green Stadium
18:32 JST (UTC+09)	Nagashima 25'	J. League	Omura 7'; Yamada 11'; Bisconti 39'	Attendance: 18,021; Referee: Shizuo Takada; Assistant referees: Yū Nakamura, Mitsuru Satō; Fourth official: Kunikazu Nakayama

== Player statistics ==
Pos.	Nat.	Player	D.o.B. (Age)	Height / Weight	J.League		Emperor's Cup		J.League Cup		Total	
Pos.	Nat.	Player	D.o.B. (Age)	Height / Weight	Apps	Goals	Apps	Goals	Apps	Goals	Apps	Goals
DF	(Japan)	Hisashi Katō	April 24, 1956 (aged 37)	174 cm / 70 kg	6	0	0	0	0	0	6	0
GK	(Brazil)	Sidmar	June 13, 1962 (aged 31)	183 cm / 78 kg	30	0	0	0	1	0	31	0
FW	(Japan)	Akihiro Nagashima	April 9, 1964 (aged 29)	181 cm / 76 kg	28	8	0	0	1	1	29	9
FW	(Brazil)	Toninho	March 23, 1965 (aged 28)	186 cm / 79 kg	44	22	1	0	0	0	45	22
MF	(Japan)	Katsumi Ōenoki	April 3, 1965 (aged 28)	178 cm / 71 kg	29	2	1	0	1	0	31	2
DF	(Brazil)	Ronaldo	June 19, 1965 (aged 28)	187 cm / 89 kg	36	3	1	0	0	0	37	3
DF	(Japan)	Yasutoshi Miura	July 15, 1965 (aged 28)	171 cm / 65 kg	37	2	1	0	1	0	39	2
DF	(Japan)	Takumi Horiike	September 6, 1965 (aged 28)	173 cm / 66 kg	44	2	1	0	1	0	46	2
FW	(Japan)	Kenta Hasegawa	September 25, 1965 (aged 28)	177 cm / 77 kg	44	9	1	1	1	0	46	10
FW	(Japan)	Tatsuru Mukōjima	January 9, 1966 (aged 28)	161 cm / 54 kg	20	2	1	0	0	0	21	2
MF	(Japan)	Masao Sugimoto	June 26, 1967 (aged 26)	167 cm / 64 kg	3	0	0	0	0	0	3	0
DF	(Japan)	Yasuhiro Yamada	February 13, 1968 (aged 26)	174 cm / 73 kg	26	0	0	0	1	0	27	0
GK	(Japan)	Masanori Sanada	March 6, 1968 (aged 26)	178 cm / 73 kg	14	0	1	0	0	0	15	0
MF	(Brazil)	Santos	March 28, 1968 (aged 25)	174 cm / 64 kg	0	0	1	0	0	0	1	0
DF	(Japan)	Shinichirō Katō	April 17, 1968 (aged 25)	173 cm / 66 kg	0	0		0	0	0		0
DF	(Japan)	Naoki Naitō	May 30, 1968 (aged 25)	180 cm / 78 kg	28	2	0	0	1	0	29	2
FW	(Japan)	Fumiaki Aoshima	July 12, 1968 (aged 25)	178 cm / 76 kg	1	0	0	0	0	0	1	0
GK	(Japan)	Katsumi Ōtaki	June 9, 1969 (aged 24)	184 cm / 70 kg	0	0		0	0	0		0
DF	(Japan)	Hiroaki Hiraoka	September 2, 1969 (aged 24)	180 cm / 70 kg	2	0	0	0	0	0	2	0
MF	(Japan)	Masaaki Sawanobori	January 12, 1970 (aged 24)	170 cm / 66 kg	41	7	1	0	1	0	43	7
MF	(Japan)	Takamitsu Ōta	July 19, 1970 (aged 23)	172 cm / 65 kg	26	0	0	0	1	0	27	0
DF	(Japan)	Shōichi Tanaka	July 24, 1970 (aged 23)	174 cm / 73 kg	0	0		0	0	0		0
GK	(Japan)	Kōji Nakahara	July 27, 1970 (aged 23)	178 cm / 78 kg	0	0		0	0	0		0
DF	(Japan)	Hiroshi Saitō	November 13, 1970 (aged 23)	178 cm / 68 kg	1	0	0	0	0	0	1	0
DF	(Japan)	Kiyoshi Nakamura	May 20, 1971 (aged 22)	176 cm / 68 kg	9	0	0	0	1	0	10	0
GK	(Japan)	Keiji Chiba	June 19, 1971 (aged 22)	184 cm / 80 kg	0	0		0	0	0		0
DF	(Japan)	Kenji Tanaka	October 10, 1971 (aged 22)	170 cm / 68 kg	0	0		0	0	0		0
FW	(Japan)	Shinya Matsubara	November 3, 1971 (aged 22)	177 cm / 69 kg	0	0		0		0		0
FW	(Japan)	Takeshi Saitō	May 29, 1972 (aged 21)	179 cm / 68 kg	0	0		0	0	0		0
FW	(Japan)	Jun Iwashita	April 8, 1973 (aged 20)	173 cm / 70 kg	24	4	0	0	1	0	25	4
MF	(Japan)	Noriaki Asakura	May 11, 1973 (aged 20)	174 cm / 70 kg	8	0	0	0	0	0	8	0
DF	(Japan)	Masaharu Kotani	June 21, 1973 (aged 20)	183 cm / 82 kg	0	0		0	0	0		0
FW	(Japan)	Yuzuki Itō	April 7, 1974 (aged 19)	172 cm / 65 kg	5	0	1	0	0	0	6	0
DF	(Japan)	Hiroyuki Shirai	June 17, 1974 (aged 19)	180 cm / 70 kg	14	1	1	0	0	0	15	1
FW	(Japan)	Hiroaki Tajima	June 27, 1974 (aged 19)	173 cm / 65 kg	0	0	1	0	0	0	1	0
MF	(Japan)	Teruyoshi Itō	August 31, 1974 (aged 19)	168 cm / 72 kg	6	0	0	0	1	0	7	0
FW	(Japan)	Ryūji Okada	September 6, 1974 (aged 19)	170 cm / 58 kg	0	0		0	0	0		0
DF	(Japan)	Manabu Mochizuki	March 14, 1975 (aged 18)	171 cm / 68 kg	0	0		0	0	0		0
MF	(Japan)	Noriaki Suzuki	April 23, 1975 (aged 18)	165 cm / 60 kg	0	0		0	0	0		0
FW	(Japan)	Ryūzō Shimizu	July 1, 1975 (aged 18)	173 cm / 68 kg	0	0		0	0	0		0
DF	(Japan)	Takahiro Yamamoto	July 30, 1975 (aged 18)	180 cm / 70 kg	0	0		0	0	0		0
MF	(Japan)	Yasuhiro Nagahashi	August 2, 1975 (aged 18)	170 cm / 67 kg	0	0		0	0	0		0
MF	(Brazil)	Djalminha †	December 9, 1970 (aged 23)	178 cm / 69 kg	11	4	0	0	0	0	11	4

- † player(s) joined the team after the opening of this season.

== Transfers ==
In:

No.	Pos.	Nation	Player
—	GK	JPN	Keiji Chiba (from Kokushikan University)
—		JPN	Takahiro Yamamoto (from Shimizu S-Pulse youth)
—	MF	JPN	Noriaki Suzuki (from Shizuoka Gakuen Senior High School)
—	MF	JPN	Yasuhiro Nagahashi (from Shizuoka Kita High School)
—	FW	JPN	Akihiro Nagashima (from Gamba Osaka)
—	FW	JPN	Takeshi Saitō (from Seikei University)
—	FW	JPN	Ryūzō Shimizu (from Shimizu Commercial High School)
—	DF	BRA	Ronaldo (from São Paulo FC)

Out:

No.	Pos.	Nation	Player
—	GK	JPN	Kiyotaka Matsui (retired)
—	DF	BRA	Marco Antonio
—	DF	JPN	Takahiro Natsuga
—	DF	JPN	Sōichi Shimane
—	DF	JPN	Yōsuke Mizoi
—	DF	BRA	Gomes
—	MF	BRA	Edu
—	MF	JPN	Nobuhide Iwashina
—	MF	JPN	Osamu Takada
—	MF	JPN	Nobuyuki Takada
—	MF	JPN	Kazuhiro Kawasumi
—	MF	JPN	Junichi Tsuruta
—	FW	BRA	Marcão

== Transfers during the season ==
=== In ===
- (Brazil) Djalminha (on September)

=== Out ===
- (Japan) Hisashi Katō (to Verdy Kawasaki)
- (Brazil) Sidmar (on October)

== Awards ==
none

== Other pages ==
- (in Japanese) J. League official site
- (in Japanese) Shimizu S-Pulse official site
