= 1992 Shimizu S-Pulse season =

Shimizu S-Pulse
1992 season
- Manager: Émerson Leão
- Stadium: Nihondaira Sports Stadium
- Emperor's Cup: Quarterfinals
- J.League Cup: Runners-up
- Top goalscorer: League: All: Mirandinha (8)
| Home colours | Away colours |

The 1992 season was Shimizu S-Pulse's first season in existence. Although selected for participation in the newly planned J1 League, the team did not play in any league during the 1992 season and instead only competed in the Emperor's Cup and the J.League Cup.

== Competitions ==
| Competitions | Position |
|---|---|
| Emperor's Cup | Quarterfinals |
| J.League Cup | Runners-up |

== Domestic results ==
=== Emperor's Cup ===
| 5 December 1992 1st Round | Kawasaki Steel | 0–3 | Shimizu S-Pulse | Fuji Stadium |
| : JST (UTC+09:00) | | | Mirandinha ?', ?'; Marco Antonio ?' |

| 6 December 1992 2nd Round | Chuoh Bohan | 1–4 | Shimizu S-Pulse | Fuji Stadium |
| : JST (UTC+09:00) | Endō ?' | | Mirandinha ?', ?', ?'; Miura ?' |

| 20 December 1992 Quarterfinals | Yokohama Marinos | 4–3 (a.e.t.) | Shimizu S-Pulse | Hakatanomori Athletic Stadium |
| : JST (UTC+09:00) | Everton ?', ?' (pen.); K. Kimura ?'; Omura ?' | | Mirandinha ?'; Toninho ?'; Horiike ?' |

=== J.League Cup ===
| 5 September 1992 GL-1 | Nagoya Grampus Eight | 3–0 | Shimizu S-Pulse | Nagoya Mizuho Football Stadium |
| 15:30 JST (UTC+09:00) | Jorginho 54'; T. Ogura 65'; Asano 70' | J. League | | Attendance: 8,029; Referee: Kōetsu Kikuchi; Assistant referees: Tatsumi Ōno; Naoyuki Mori; Fourth official: Takayoshi Kashino |

| 9 September 1992 GL-2 | Shimizu S-Pulse | 2–1 | Yokohama Marinos | Nihondaira Sports Stadium |
| 19:00 JST (UTC+09:00) | Ōenoki 72'; Sawanobori 82' | J. League | Yamada 40' | Attendance: 8,032; Referee: Masayoshi Okada; Assistant referees: Kimio Izaki; Yasushi Tsuchimoto; Fourth official: Masami Urayama |

| 12 September 1992 GL-3 | Shimizu S-Pulse | 0–1 | Sanfrecce Hiroshima | Nihondaira Sports Stadium |
| 16:00 JST (UTC+09:00) | | J. League | Tanaka 84' | Attendance: 5,699; Referee: Yōtarō Moritsu; Assistant referees: Keiji Hayashi; Yoshimi Ogawa; Fourth official: Takuji Fukazawa |

| 19 September 1992 GL-4 | Yokohama Flügels | 0–3 | Shimizu S-Pulse | Kagoshima Kamoike Stadium |
| 15:37 JST (UTC+09:00) | | J. League | Mirandinha 46'; Toninho 84', 89' | Attendance: 4,687; Referee: Kenji Tanaka; Assistant referees: Kazuya Yanagisawa; Akihiro Torigoe; Fourth official: Shōji Hamada |

| 23 September 1992 GL-5 | Shimizu S-Pulse | 1–2 | Gamba Osaka | Kusanagi Athletic Stadium |
| 16:00 JST (UTC+09:00) | Ōenoki 84' | J. League | Nagashima 50'; Müller 68' | Attendance: 12,199; Referee: Tetsuya Hamana; Assistant referees: Yoshio Sawada; Yoshimi Ogawa; Fourth official: Teruhito Kudō |

| 26 September 1992 GL-6 | Kashima Antlers | 1–4 | Shimizu S-Pulse | Kasamatsu Stadium |
| 15:04 JST (UTC+09:00) | Kurosaki 12' | J. League | Mirandinha 14'; Mukōjima 16', 21'; Toninho 89' | Attendance: 11,333; Referee: Kiichirō Tachi; Assistant referees: Takashi Nohara; Masato Nogami; Fourth official: Ryūichi Mogi |

| 3 October 1992 GL-7 | Shimizu S-Pulse | 4–1 | Urawa Red Diamonds | Nihondaira Sports Stadium |
| 16:00 JST (UTC+09:00) | Ōenoki 9', 81'; Hasegawa 49', 89' | J. League | Ozaki 42' | Attendance: 5,321; Referee: Masayoshi Okada; Assistant referees: Yoshio Sawada; Yoshimi Ogawa; Fourth official: Takeshi Sakai |

| 7 October 1992 GL-8 | Verdy Kawasaki | 1–0 | Shimizu S-Pulse | Tokyo National Stadium |
| 19:00 JST (UTC+09:00) | Ramos 43' | J. League | | Attendance: 39,032; Referee: Shizuo Takada; Assistant referees: Hideo Kikuchi; Naotsugu Fuse; Fourth official: Masashi Kajino |

| 11 October 1992 GL-9 | Shimizu S-Pulse | 2–2 (sudden-death) (a.e.t.) (1–0 p) | JEF United Ichihara | Nihondaira Sports Stadium |
| 14:00 JST (UTC+09:00) | Marco Antonio 15'; Horiike 87' | J. League | Makino 48'; Echigo 74' | Attendance: 8,228; Referee: Masayoshi Okada; Assistant referees: Mitsuru Satō; Yoshimi Ogawa; Fourth official: Masami Urayama |
| | Penalties |
| | (penalty scored) Toninho | | (penalty missed) Pavel |

| 16 October 1992 Semifinals | Shimizu S-Pulse | 1–0 | Nagoya Grampus Eight | Kusanagi Athletic Stadium |
| 19:00 JST (UTC+09:00) | Naitō 9' | J. League | | Attendance: 13,391; Referee: Shinichirō Obata; Assistant referees: Morihisa Yamaguchi; Hiroyuki Umemoto; Fourth official: Yoshimi Ogawa |

| 23 November 1992 Final | Verdy Kawasaki | 1–0 | Shimizu S-Pulse | Tokyo National Stadium |
| 14:00 JST (UTC+09:00) | Miura 57' | J. League | | Attendance: 56,000; Referee: Masahiro Sogawa; Assistant referees: Fumikazu Shioyazono; Hitoshi Yamada; Fourth official: Kōetsu Kikuchi |

== Player statistics ==
| Pos. | Nat. | Player | D.o.B. (Age) | Height / Weight | Emperor's Cup | | J.League Cup | | Total | |
| Pos. | Nat. | Player | D.o.B. (Age) | Height / Weight | Apps | Goals | Apps | Goals | Apps | Goals |
|---|---|---|---|---|---|---|---|---|---|---|
| FW | (Brazil) | Mirandinha | July 2, 1959 (aged 33) | 172 cm / 69 kg | 3 | 6 | 8 | 2 | 11 | 8 |
| GK | (Japan) | Kiyotaka Matsui | January 4, 1961 (aged 31) | 180 cm / 83 kg | | 0 | 0 | 0 | | 0 |
| MF | | Yasushi Kawakami | May 8, 1963 (aged 29) | 168 cm / 65 kg | | 0 | 0 | 0 | | 0 |
| DF | (Brazil) | Marco Antonio | August 20, 1963 (aged 29) | 190 cm / 90 kg | | 1 | 11 | 1 | | 2 |
| FW | (Brazil) | Toninho | March 23, 1965 (aged 27) | 186 cm / 82 kg | | 1 | 11 | 3 | | 4 |
| MF | (Japan) | Katsumi Ōenoki | April 3, 1965 (aged 27) | 178 cm / 71 kg | | 0 | 9 | 4 | | 4 |
| DF | (Japan) | Yasutoshi Miura | July 15, 1965 (aged 27) | 171 cm / 65 kg | | 1 | 11 | 0 | | 1 |
| DF | (Japan) | Takumi Horiike | September 6, 1965 (aged 26) | 173 cm / 66 kg | | 1 | 11 | 1 | | 2 |
| FW | (Japan) | Kenta Hasegawa | September 25, 1965 (aged 26) | 177 cm / 77 kg | | 0 | 10 | 2 | | 2 |
| FW | (Japan) | Tatsuru Mukōjima | January 9, 1966 (aged 26) | 161 cm / 53 kg | | 0 | 11 | 2 | | 2 |
| DF | (Japan) | Yasuhiro Yamada | February 13, 1968 (aged 24) | 174 cm / 73 kg | | 0 | 2 | 0 | | 0 |
| GK | (Japan) | Masanori Sanada | March 6, 1968 (aged 24) | 178 cm / 73 kg | | 0 | 11 | 0 | | 0 |
| MF | (Brazil) | Ademir Santos | March 28, 1968 (aged 24) | 174 cm / 64 kg | | 0 | 1 | 0 | | 0 |
| DF | (Japan) | Naoki Naitō | May 30, 1968 (aged 24) | 180 cm / 78 kg | | 0 | 7 | 1 | | 1 |
| FW | (Japan) | Fumiaki Aoshima | July 12, 1968 (aged 24) | 178 cm / 76 kg | | 0 | 4 | 0 | | 0 |
| FW | (Japan) | Manabu Sugiyama | July 24, 1968 (aged 24) | 179 cm / 68 kg | | 0 | 0 | 0 | | 0 |
| DF | (Japan) | Takahiro Natsuga | February 27, 1969 (aged 23) | 177 cm / 74 kg | | 0 | 0 | 0 | | 0 |
| DF | (Japan) | Sōichi Shimane | May 28, 1969 (aged 23) | 177 cm / 72 kg | | 0 | 0 | 0 | | 0 |
| GK | (Japan) | Katsumi Ōtaki | June 9, 1969 (aged 23) | 184 cm / 70 kg | | 0 | 0 | 0 | | 0 |
| DF | (Japan) | Hiroaki Hiraoka | September 2, 1969 (aged 23) | 180 cm / 70 kg | | 0 | 10 | 0 | | 0 |
| FW | (Japan) | Yukihiro Imaizumi | September 28, 1969 (aged 22) | 157 cm / 62 kg | | 0 | 0 | 0 | | 0 |
| MF | (Japan) | Nobuhide Iwashina | December 11, 1969 (aged 22) | 165 cm / 67 kg | | 0 | 0 | 0 | | 0 |
| MF | (Japan) | Masaaki Sawanobori | January 12, 1970 (aged 22) | 170 cm / 65 kg | | 0 | 10 | 1 | | 1 |
| MF | (Japan) | Takamitsu Ōta | July 19, 1970 (aged 22) | 172 cm / 65 kg | | 0 | 1 | 0 | | 0 |
| MF | (Japan) | Nobuyuki Takada | August 11, 1970 (aged 22) | 173 cm / 65 kg | | 0 | 0 | 0 | | 0 |
| DF | (Japan) | Kiyoshi Nakamura | May 20, 1971 (aged 21) | 176 cm / 68 kg | | 0 | 0 | 0 | | 0 |
| MF | (Japan) | Junichi Tsuruta | September 28, 1971 (aged 20) | 160 cm / 53 kg | | 0 | 0 | 0 | | 0 |
| MF | (Japan) | Kenji Tanaka | October 10, 1971 (aged 20) | 170 cm / 68 kg | | 0 | 0 | 0 | | 0 |
| FW | (Japan) | Shinya Matsubara | November 3, 1971 (aged 20) | 177 cm / 69 kg | | 0 | 0 | 0 | | 0 |
| DF | (Japan) | Yōsuke Mizoi | December 21, 1971 (aged 20) | 172 cm / 67 kg | | 0 | 0 | 0 | | 0 |
| FW | (Brazil) | Gerson Antonio Porto | April 24, 1972 (aged 20) | 168 cm / 68 kg | | 0 | 0 | 0 | | 0 |
| MF | (Japan) | Akira Saitō | July 13, 1972 (aged 20) | 177 cm / 67 kg | | 0 | 0 | 0 | | 0 |
| GK | (Japan) | Naruchika Ariwara | February 28, 1973 (aged 19) | 185 cm / 81 kg | | 0 | 0 | 0 | | 0 |
| FW | (Japan) | Jun Iwashita | April 8, 1973 (aged 19) | 173 cm / 70 kg | | 0 | 0 | 0 | | 0 |
| MF | (Japan) | Noriaki Asakura | May 11, 1973 (aged 19) | 174 cm / 69 kg | | 0 | 7 | 0 | | 0 |
| DF | (Japan) | Masaharu Kotani | June 21, 1973 (aged 19) | 183 cm / 82 kg | | 0 | 0 | 0 | | 0 |

== Transfers ==
In:

| No. | Pos. | Nation | Player |
|---|---|---|---|
| — | GK | JPN | Masanori Sanada (from ANA SC) |
| — | GK | JPN | Kiyotaka Matsui (from NKK) |
| — | GK | JPN | Katsumi Ōtaki (from Meiji University) |
| — | DF | JPN | Takumi Horiike (from Yomiuri) |
| — | DF | JPN | Yasutoshi Miura (from Yomiuri) |
| — | DF | JPN | Naoki Naitō (from Hitachi) |
| — | DF | JPN | Hiroaki Hiraoka (from Juntendo University) |
| — | DF | JPN | Sōichi Shimane (from Senshu University) |
| — | DF | JPN | Yōsuke Mizoi (from Yomiuri Junior) |
| — | DF | BRA | Marco Antonio (from Grêmio Sãocarlense FC) |
| — | MF | JPN | Masaaki Sawanobori (from Tokai University) |
| — | MF | JPN | Nobuhide Iwashina (from Kokushikan University) |
| — | MF | JPN | Noriaki Asakura (from Shizuoka Kita High School) |
| — | FW | JPN | Tatsuru Mukōjima (from Toshiba) |
| — | FW | JPN | Jun Iwashita (from Tokai University Daiichi Senior High School) |
| — | FW | BRA | Mirandinha (from Corinthians) |
| — | FW | BRA | Toninho (from Yomiuri) |
| — | FW | BRA | Gerson Antonio Porto (from Shizuoka Kita High School) |
| — | GK | JPN | Naruchika Ariwara (from Pioneer) |
| — | DF | JPN | Masaharu Kotani (from Tokai University Daiichi Senior High School) |
| — | MF | JPN | Akira Saitō (from Nissan farm) |
| — | MF | JPN | Nobuyuki Takada (from Cosmo Oil) |
| — | MF | JPN | Junichi Tsuruta (from NEC) |
| — | MF | JPN | Kenji Tanaka (from Teikyo University) |
| — | FW | JPN | Sinya Matsubara (from Argentina Cipolletti) |
| — | FW | JPN | Manabu Sugiyama (from Kokushikan University) |
| — | FW | JPN | Yukihiro Imaizumi (from Ferroviário) |

Out:

| No. | Pos. | Nation | Player |

== Transfers during the season ==
=== In ===
none

=== Out ===
none

== Other pages ==
- (in Japanese) J. League official site
- (in Japanese) Shimizu S-Pulse official site
