= Fumiaki Aoshima =

Japanese footballer

Fumiaki Aoshima 青嶋 文明
Personal information
- Full name: Fumiaki Aoshima
- Date of birth: July 12, 1968 (age 58)
- Place of birth: Shizuoka, Japan
- Height: 1.78 m (5 ft 10 in)
- Position: Forward

Youth career
- 1984–1986: Shimizu Shogyo High School

Senior career*
Years	Team	Apps	(Gls)
1987–1991	Yamaha Motors	18	(2)
1992–1995	Shimizu S-Pulse	8	(3)
1995–1996	Tosu Futures	26	(18)
1996–1998	Honda	48	(30)
Total		100	(53)
Medal record
Yamaha Motors
Winner	Japan Soccer League	1987/88
Runner-up	JSL Cup	1989
Runner-up	Emperor's Cup	1989
Shimizu S-Pulse
Runner-up	J.League Cup	1992
Runner-up	J.League Cup	1993
- * Club domestic league appearances and goals

Fumiaki Aoshima (青嶋 文明, Aoshima Fumiaki; born July 12, 1968) is a former Japanese football player.

== Playing career ==
Aoshima was born in Shizuoka Prefecture on July 12, 1968. After graduating from high school, he joined his local club Yamaha Motors in 1987. Although he hardly played in any matches at first, he played many matches as forward in 1990–91 season. In 1992, he moved to a new club, the Shimizu S-Pulse, which is based in his hometown. However he could hardly play in the match behind Kenta Hasegawa, Tatsuru Mukojima and Akihiro Nagashima. In 1995, he moved to Japan Football League (JFL) club Tosu Futures. He played as regular player and scored 15 goals. In 1996, he returned to his local and joined JFL club Honda. He played as a regular player and the club won the championship in 1996. He retired at the end of the 1998 season.

== Club statistics ==
Season	Club	League	J.League		J.League Cup		Total	
Season	Club	League	Apps	Goals	Apps	Goals	Apps	Goals
1992	Shimizu S-Pulse	J1 League	-		4	0	4	0
1993	Shimizu S-Pulse	J1 League	6	3	3	0	9	3
1994	Shimizu S-Pulse	J1 League	1	0	0	0	1	0
1995	Shimizu S-Pulse	J1 League	1	0	-		1	0
Total			8	3	7	0	15	3
