= 1991 JSL Cup final =

Yomiuri	Honda
4	3
- Date: September 1, 1991
- Venue: Nagoya Mizuho Athletics Stadium, Aichi

1991 JSL Cup final was the 16th final of the JSL Cup competition. The final was played at Nagoya Mizuho Athletics Stadium in Aichi on September 1, 1991. Yomiuri won the championship.

== Overview ==
Yomiuri won their 3rd title, by defeating Honda 4–3 with Nobuhiro Takeda, Toninho, Kazuyoshi Miura and Tsuyoshi Kitazawa goal.

== Match details ==
September 1, 1991

Yomiuri	4-3	Honda
Nobuhiro Takeda 41'; Toninho 68'; Kazuyoshi Miura 80'; Tsuyoshi Kitazawa 89'		Hisashi Kurosaki 54', 82'; Yoshiyuki Hasegawa 65'

Nagoya Mizuho Athletics Stadium

== See also ==
- 1991 JSL Cup
