= Takumi Horiike =

Japanese footballer (born 1965)

Takumi Horiike 堀池 巧
Personal information
- Full name: Takumi Horiike
- Date of birth: 6 September 1965 (age 61)
- Place of birth: Shizuoka, Japan
- Height: 1.73 m (5 ft 8 in)
- Position: Defender

Youth career
- 1981–1983: Shimizu Higashi High School

College career
Years	Team	Apps	(Gls)
1984–1987	Juntendo University		

Senior career*
Years	Team	Apps	(Gls)
1988–1992	Yomiuri	85	(1)
1992–1999	Shimizu S-Pulse	180	(3)
1998–1999	→ Cerezo Osaka (loan)	23	(0)
Total		288	(4)

International career
1986–1995	Japan	58	(2)
Medal record
Yomiuri
Winner	Japan Soccer League	1990/91
Winner	Japan Soccer League	1991/92
Runner-up	Japan Soccer League	1989/90
Winner	JSL Cup	1991
Runner-up	Emperor's Cup	1991
Shimizu S-Pulse
Runner-up	J1 League	1999
Winner	J.League Cup	1996
Runner-up	J.League Cup	1992
Runner-up	J.League Cup	1993
Runner-up	Emperor's Cup	1998
Representing Japan
AFC Asian Cup
Gold medal – first place	1992 Japan
- * Club domestic league appearances and goals

Takumi Horiike (堀池 巧, Horiike Takumi; born 6 September 1965) is a former Japanese football player. He played for Japan national team.

== Club career ==
Horiike was educated at, and played for, Shimizu Higashi High School. He won the national high school championship with his teammates, including Katsumi Oenoki and Kenta Hasegawa. He continued his study and football at Juntendo University.

After graduating in 1988, he joined the Japan Soccer League team of Yomiuri. He played as a defensive midfielder, then as centre back, partnered with Hisashi Kato. When Japan's first professional league, the J1 League, started, Shimizu S-Pulse was founded in his local city. He joined the club in 1992 and re-united with his high school teammates Oenoki and Hasegawa. His position was a right full back. After the end of the inaugural season, he was chosen as a member of the Best Eleven in 1993.

He was transferred to Cerezo Osaka in 1998 and came back to Shimizu briefly in 1999 before resigning.

== National team career ==
Horiike was capped 58 times and scored 2 goals for the Japan national team between 1986 and 1995. He made his international debut on 1 August 1986 in a friendly against Malaysia while he was still a university student. He was mainly a right full back for the national team. He was a member of the Japan team that won the 1992 Asian Cup and he played 4 matches in the competition. Under national coach Hans Ooft, Japan progressed to the Final round at 1994 World Cup qualification. Horiike was on the pitch when Japan's hope to play in the finals was dashed by an injury-time Iraqi equaliser in the last qualifier, the match that the Japanese fans now refer to as the Agony of Doha.

He is currently working as a soccer commentator on television.

== Club statistics ==
Club performance			League		Cup		League Cup		Total	
Season	Club	League	Apps	Goals	Apps	Goals	Apps	Goals	Apps	Goals
Japan			League		Emperor's Cup		J.League Cup		Total	
1988/89	Yomiuri	JSL Division 1	18	0	3	0	3	0	24	0
1989/90	Yomiuri	JSL Division 1	22	0	4	1	4	0	30	1
1990/91	Yomiuri	JSL Division 1	22	1	2	1	2	0	26	2
1991/92	Yomiuri	JSL Division 1	22	0	5	0	5	0	32	0
1992	Shimizu S-Pulse	J1 League	-		3	1	11	1	14	2
1993	Shimizu S-Pulse	J1 League	36	1	4	0	1	0	41	1
1994	Shimizu S-Pulse	J1 League	44	2	1	0	1	0	46	2
1995	Shimizu S-Pulse	J1 League	40	0	1	0	-		41	0
1996	Shimizu S-Pulse	J1 League	30	0	3	0	16	0	49	0
1997	Shimizu S-Pulse	J1 League	29	0	0	0	6	0	35	0
1998	Shimizu S-Pulse	J1 League	1	0	0	0	9	0	10	0
1998	Cerezo Osaka	J1 League	14	0	1	1	0	0	15	1
1999	Cerezo Osaka	J1 League	9	0	0	0	0	0	9	0
1999	Shimizu S-Pulse	J1 League	0	0	0	0	2	0	2	0
Total			287	4	29	4	58	1	374	9

== National team statistics ==
Japan national team
Year	Apps	Goals
1986	2	0
1987	11	0
1988	1	0
1989	11	1
1990	6	0
1991	2	0
1992	7	0
1993	16	1
1994	0	0
1995	2	0
Total	58	2

== Honors and awards ==
=== Individual honors ===
- J.League Best Eleven: 1993

=== Team honors ===
- 1992 Asian Cup (Champions)
