= Hiroaki Tajima =

Japanese footballer

Hiroaki Tajima 田島 宏晃
Personal information
- Full name: Hiroaki Tajima
- Date of birth: June 27, 1974 (age 52)
- Place of birth: Shizuoka, Japan
- Height: 1.74 m (5 ft 8 1/2 in)
- Position: Forward

Youth career
- 1990–1992: Shimizu Higashi High School

Senior career*
Years	Team	Apps	(Gls)
1993–1996	Shimizu S-Pulse	28	(4)
1997–1999	Honda	69	(13)
2000–2002	Yokohama FC	94	(12)
2003	Sagawa Express Tokyo	0	(0)
Total		191	(29)
Medal record
Shimizu S-Pulse
Winner	J.League Cup	1996
Runner-up	J.League Cup	1993
- * Club domestic league appearances and goals

Hiroaki Tajima (田島 宏晃, Tajima Hiroaki; born June 27, 1974) is a former Japanese football player.

== Playing career ==
Tajima was born in Shizuoka Prefecture on June 27, 1974. After graduating from Shimizu Higashi High School, he joined his local club Shimizu S-Pulse in 1993. He played forward and offensive midfielder. However he could not play many matches at the club. In 1997, he moved to Japan Football League club Honda. He played many matches in 3 season. In 2000, he moved to Japan Football League (JFL) club Yokohama FC. He played as regular player and the club won the champions in 2000 and was promoted to J2 League. In 2003, he moved to JFL club Sagawa Express Tokyo. However he could not play at all in the match and retired end of 2003 season.

== Club statistics ==
Club performance			League		Cup		League Cup		Total	
Season	Club	League	Apps	Goals	Apps	Goals	Apps	Goals	Apps	Goals
Japan			League		Emperor's Cup		J.League Cup		Total	
1993	Shimizu S-Pulse	J1 League	8	3	2	0	6	1	16	4
1994	Shimizu S-Pulse	J1 League	0	0	1	0	0	0	1	0
1995	Shimizu S-Pulse	J1 League	17	1	1	0	-		18	1
1996	Shimizu S-Pulse	J1 League	3	0	0	0	0	0	3	0
1997	Honda	Football League	19	1	0	0	-		19	1
1998	Honda	Football League	30	1	4	0	-		34	1
1999	Honda	Football League	20	11	1	0	-		21	11
2000	Yokohama FC	Football League	18	4	2	0	-		20	4
2001	Yokohama FC	J2 League	41	3	4	2	4	0	49	5
2002	Yokohama FC	J2 League	35	5	3	0	-		38	5
2003	Sagawa Express Tokyo	Football League	0	0	0	0	-		0	0
Total			191	29	18	2	10	1	219	32
