= Hiroshi Saito (footballer) =

Japanese footballer

Hiroshi Saito 斉藤 浩史
Personal information
- Full name: Hiroshi Saito
- Date of birth: November 13, 1970 (age 55)
- Place of birth: Tokyo, Japan
- Height: 1.78 m (5 ft 10 in)
- Position: Defender

Youth career
- 1986–1988: Yomiuri

Senior career*
Years	Team	Apps	(Gls)
1989–1992	Yomiuri	10	(0)
1992	XV Novembro-Jaú		
1993–1994	Shimizu S-Pulse	16	(0)
1995	Brummell Sendai	20	(0)
Total		46	(0)
Medal record
Yomiuri
Winner	Japan Soccer League	1990/91
Winner	Japan Soccer League	1991/92
Runner-up	Japan Soccer League	1989/90
Winner	JSL Cup	1991
Runner-up	Emperor's Cup	1991
Shimizu S-Pulse
Runner-up	J.League Cup	1993
- * Club domestic league appearances and goals

Hiroshi Saito (斉藤 浩史, Saitō Hiroshi; born November 13, 1970) is a former Japanese football player.

== Playing career ==
Saito was born in Tokyo on November 13, 1970. He joined Yomiuri from youth team in 1989. In 1992, he moved to Brazilian club XV Novembro-Jaú. In 1993, he returned to Japan and joined Shimizu S-Pulse. Although he played many matches as defender in 1993, he could hardly play in the match in 1994. In 1995, he moved to Japan Football League club Brummell Sendai. He retired at the end of the 1995 season.

== Post-playing career ==
He joined Kyodo Co., Ltd., a company specializing in industrial equipment, where he was appointed President and Representative Director in September 2013. On 31 October 2023, Kyodo Co., Ltd. announced that it became the new owner of the Suzuka Point Getters after purchasing a 100% stake, appointing Saito as the club's new chairman and renaming the team to Atletico Suzuka Club.

== Club statistics ==
Club performance			League		Cup		League Cup		Total	
Season	Club	League	Apps	Goals	Apps	Goals	Apps	Goals	Apps	Goals
Japan			League		Emperor's Cup		J.League Cup		Total	
1989/90	Yomiuri	JSL Division 1								
1990/91	Yomiuri	JSL Division 1								
1991/92	Yomiuri	JSL Division 1								
1993	Shimizu S-Pulse	J1 League	15	0	0	0	0	0	15	0
1994	Shimizu S-Pulse	J1 League	1	0	0	0	0	0	1	0
Total			16	0	0	0	0	0	16	0
