= Takamitsu Ota =

Japanese footballer (1970–2026)

Takamitsu Ota 太田 貴光
Personal information
- Date of birth: July 19, 1970
- Place of birth: Shizuoka, Japan
- Date of death: August 12, 2026 (aged 56)
- Height: 1.72 m (5 ft 8 in)
- Position: Midfielder

Youth career
- 1986–1988: Shimizu Commercial High School

Senior career*
Years	Team	Apps	(Gls)
1989–1990	Fujitsu	0	(0)
1990–1992	Toyota Motors	1	(0)
1992–1995	Shimizu S-Pulse	55	(0)
1996–1998	Consadole Sapporo	43	(3)
1999–2001	Jatco TT	64	(7)
Total		163	(10)
Medal record
Shimizu S-Pulse
Runner-up	J.League Cup	1992
Runner-up	J.League Cup	1993
- * Club domestic league appearances and goals

Takamitsu Ota (太田 貴光, Ota Takamitsu; July 19, 1970 – August 12, 2026) was a Japanese footballer who played as a midfielder.

== Career ==
Ota was born in Shizuoka on July 19, 1970. After graduating from Shimizu Commercial High School, he joined Fujitsu in 1989. However he could not play at all in the match. In 1990, he moved to Toyota Motors. However he could hardly play in the match. In 1992, he moved to new club Shimizu S-Pulse based in his local. He played many matches as midfielder from 1993. However his opportunity to play decreased in 1995. In 1996, he moved to Japan Football League (JFL) club Consadole Sapporo. The club won the champions in 1997 and was promoted to J1 League. In 1999, he moved to Japan Football League club Jatco (later Jatco TT). He retired end of 2001 season.

== Death ==
Ota died on August 12, 2026, at the age of 56.

== Career statistics ==
Appearances and goals by club, season and competition
Club	Season	League			Emperor's Cup		J.League Cup		Total	
Club	Season	Division	Apps	Goals	Apps	Goals	Apps	Goals	Apps	Goals
Fujitsu	1989–90	JSL Division 2	0	0					0	0
Toyota Motors	1990–91	JSL Division 1	1	0					1	0
Toyota Motors	1991–92	JSL Division 1	0	0					0	0
Shimizu S-Pulse	1992	J1 League	–		0	0	1	0	1	0
Shimizu S-Pulse	1993	J1 League	21	0	1	0	6	0	28	0
Shimizu S-Pulse	1994	J1 League	26	0	0	0	1	0	27	0
Shimizu S-Pulse	1995	J1 League	8	0	0	0	–		8	0
Consadole Sapporo	1996	Japan Football League	5	0	1	0	–		6	0
Consadole Sapporo	1997	Japan Football League	24	1	0	0	6	0	30	1
Consadole Sapporo	1998	J1 League	14	2	0	0	0	0	14	2
Jatco TT (Note: "Jatco SC" until 2000)	1999	Japan Football League	16	1	2	0	–		18	1
Jatco TT	2000	Japan Football League	20	2	3	1	–		23	3
Jatco TT	2001	Japan Football League	28	4	2	0	–		30	4
Career total			163	10	9	1	14	0	186	11
