= Masao Sugimoto =

Japanese footballer

Masao Sugimoto 杉本 雅央
Personal information
- Full name: Masao Sugimoto
- Date of birth: June 26, 1967 (age 59)
- Place of birth: Shizuoka, Japan
- Height: 1.67 m (5 ft 5 1/2 in)
- Position: Midfielder

Youth career
- 1983–1985: Tokai University Daiichi High School
- 1986–1989: Juntendo University

Senior career*
Years	Team	Apps	(Gls)
1990–1992	Yamaha Motors	32	(2)
1993–1996	Shimizu S-Pulse	31	(0)
Total		63	(2)
Medal record
Shimizu S-Pulse
Winner	J.League Cup	1996
Runner-up	J.League Cup	1993
- * Club domestic league appearances and goals

Masao Sugimoto (杉本 雅央, Sugimoto Masao; born June 26, 1967) is a former Japanese football player.

== Playing career ==
Sugimoto was born in Shizuoka on June 26, 1967. After graduating from Juntendo University, he joined Yamaha Motors in 1990. He played many matches as midfielder from first season. In 1993, he moved to Shimizu S-Pulse. Although he played many matches in 1993, his opportunity to play decreased from 1994. He retired end of 1996 season.

== Club statistics ==
Club performance			League		Cup		League Cup		Total	
Season	Club	League	Apps	Goals	Apps	Goals	Apps	Goals	Apps	Goals
Japan			League		Emperor's Cup		J.League Cup		Total	
1990–91	Yamaha Motors	JSL Division 1	16	2			2	0	18	2
1991–92	Yamaha Motors	JSL Division 1	9	0			1	0	10	0
1992	Yamaha Motors	Football League	7	0	0	0	-		7	0
1993	Shimizu S-Pulse	J1 League	22	0	4	1	6	2	32	3
1994	Shimizu S-Pulse	J1 League	3	0	0	0	0	0	3	0
1995	Shimizu S-Pulse	J1 League	0	0	0	0	-		0	0
1996	Shimizu S-Pulse	J1 League	6	0	0	0	3	0	9	0
Total			63	2	4	1	12	2	79	5
