= Hiroaki Hiraoka (footballer) =

Japanese footballer and manager

Hiroaki Hiraoka 平岡 宏章
Personal information
- Full name: Hiroaki Hiraoka
- Date of birth: September 2, 1969 (age 57)
- Place of birth: Shizuoka, Japan
- Height: 1.80 m (5 ft 11 in)
- Position: Defender

Youth career
- 1985–1987: Shimizu Shogyo High School

College career
Years	Team	Apps	(Gls)
1988–1991	Juntendo University		

Senior career*
Years	Team	Apps	(Gls)
1992–1995	Shimizu S-Pulse	28	(0)
1996	Consadole Sapporo	7	(0)
1997–1998	Albirex Niigata		

Managerial career
- 2007–2008: Albirex Niigata Singapore
- 2020: Shimizu S-Pulse
- 2021–2022: Shimizu S-Pulse
Medal record
Shimizu S-Pulse
Runner-up	J.League Cup	1992
Runner-up	J.League Cup	1993
- * Club domestic league appearances and goals

Hiroaki Hiraoka (平岡 宏章, Hiraoka Hiroaki; born September 2, 1969) is a former Japanese football player and manager.

== Playing career ==
Hiraoka was born in Shizuoka Prefecture on September 2, 1969. After graduating from Juntendo University, he joined new club Shimizu S-Pulse based in his local in 1992. He became a regular player as left side back and the club won the 2nd place 1992 and 1993 J.League Cup. However he did not play in many matches in 1994. In 1996, he moved to the Japan Football League (JFL) club Consadole Sapporo. However he did not play in many matches there, either. In 1997, he moved to the Regional Leagues club Albirex Niigata. The club was promoted to JFL in 1998. He retired at the end of the 1998 season.

== Coaching career ==
After retirement, Hiraoka started coaching career for Albirex Niigata in 1999. In 2007, he became a manager for Albirex Niigata Singapore and managed the club until 2008.

== Career statistics ==
Appearances and goals by club, season and competition
Club	Season	League			Emperor's Cup		J.League Cup		Total	
Club	Season	Division	Apps	Goals	Apps	Goals	Apps	Goals	Apps	Goals
Shimizu S-Pulse	1992	J1 League	-		3	0	10	0	13	0
Shimizu S-Pulse	1993	J1 League	25	0	4	0	7	0	36	0
Shimizu S-Pulse	1994	J1 League	2	0	0	0	0	0	2	0
Shimizu S-Pulse	1995	J1 League	1	0	0	0	-		1	0
Consadole Sapporo	1996	Football League	7	0	0	0	-		7	0
Albirex Niigata	1997	Regional Leagues								
Albirex Niigata	1998	Football League	30	0	3	0	-		33	0
Career total			65	0	10	0	17	0	92	0
