= Sidmar (footballer) =

Brazilian football coach and former player

Personal information
- Full name: Sidmar Antônio Martins
- Date of birth: 13 June 1962 (age 64)
- Place of birth: Brazil
- Height: 1.83 m (6 ft 0 in)
- Position: Goalkeeper

Senior career*
Years	Team	Apps	(Gls)
1979–1983	Guarani		
1984–1988	XV Novembro-Piracicaba		
1988	Bahia		
1989–1990	Portuguesa Desportos		
1991–1992	Grêmio		
1992–1993	XV Novembro-Piracicaba		
1993–1994	Shimizu S-Pulse	47	(0)
1994–1995	XV Novembro-Piracicaba		
1995	Shimizu S-Pulse	14	(0)
2017	Fujieda MYFC	0	(0)
- * Club domestic league appearances and goals

Sidmar Antônio Martins (born 13 June 1962) is a former Brazilian football player who played as a goalkeeper. He is currently goalkeeper coach of Vissel Kobe.

== Club statistics ==
Club performance			League		Cup		League Cup		Total	
Season	Club	League	Apps	Goals	Apps	Goals	Apps	Goals	Apps	Goals
Japan			League		Emperor's Cup		J.League Cup		Total	
1993	Shimizu S-Pulse	J1 League	17	0	4	0	6	0	27	0
1994	Shimizu S-Pulse	J1 League	30	0	0	0	1	0	31	0
1995	Shimizu S-Pulse	J1 League	14	0	0	0	-		14	0
2017	Fujieda MYFC	J3 League	0	0	-		-		0	0
Total			61	0	4	0	7	0	72	0
