= Katsumi Oenoki =

Japanese footballer

Katsumi Oenoki 大榎 克己
Personal information
- Full name: Katsumi Oenoki
- Date of birth: April 3, 1965 (age 61)
- Place of birth: Shizuoka, Japan
- Height: 1.78 m (5 ft 10 in)
- Position: Midfielder

Youth career
- 1981–1983: Shimizu Higashi High School

College career
Years	Team	Apps	(Gls)
1984–1987	Waseda University		

Senior career*
Years	Team	Apps	(Gls)
1988–1991	Yamaha Motors	54	(6)
1992–2002	Shimizu S-Pulse	252	(10)
Total		306	(16)

International career
1989–1990	Japan	5	(0)

Managerial career
- 2014–2015: Shimizu S-Pulse
Medal record
Yamaha Motors
Runner-up	JSL Cup	1989
Runner-up	Emperor's Cup	1989
Shimizu S-Pulse
Runner-up	J1 League	1999
Winner	J.League Cup	1996
Runner-up	J.League Cup	1992
Runner-up	J.League Cup	1993
Winner	Emperor's Cup	2001
Runner-up	Emperor's Cup	1998
Runner-up	Emperor's Cup	2000
- * Club domestic league appearances and goals

Katsumi Oenoki (大榎 克己, Ōenoki Katsumi; born April 3, 1965) is a former Japanese football player. He played for Japan national team.

== Club career ==
Oenoki was educated at and played for Shimizu Higashi High School. He won the national high school championship with his teammates including Kenta Hasegawa and Takumi Horiike. He continued his study and football at Waseda University.

After graduating from the university in 1988, he joined Japan Soccer League side Yamaha Motors (current Júbilo Iwata). When Japan's first-ever professional league J1 League started, Shimizu S-Pulse was founded in his local city. He joined the club in 1992 and re-united with his high school teammates Hasegawa and Horiike. He helped the club to win the 1996 J.League Cup, the second stage of the 1999 J1 League, and the 1999–2000 Asian Cup Winners' Cup.

He made more than 250 league appearances for Shimizu and retired after the 2002 season.

== National team career ==
Oenoki was capped 5 times for the Japan national team between 1989 and 1990. His first international appearance came on May 5, 1989, in a friendly against Korea in Seoul. he also played at 1990 World Cup qualification.

== Coaching career ==
Oenoki worked as a coach at Shimizu S-Pulse in 2003 and he was the manager of Waseda University between 2004 and 2007. Under his guidance, Waseda was promoted from the Tokyo Prefectural University League to the Kanto League Div 2 in 2004, and then to Div 1 in 2005. The club finished runners-up in the national intercollegiate championship in 2006. He acquired the S-Class coaching license that is a prerequisite to manage a J.League club in 2007. In 2008, he returned to Shimizu S-Pulse and became a manager for youth team. In July 2014, he became a manager for top team as Afshin Ghotbi successor. However the club performance is bad he resigned in July 2015.

== Club statistics ==
Club performance			League		Cup		League Cup		Total	
Season	Club	League	Apps	Goals	Apps	Goals	Apps	Goals	Apps	Goals
Japan			League		Emperor's Cup		J.League Cup		Total	
1988/89	Yamaha Motors	JSL Division 1	16	2					16	2
1989/90	Yamaha Motors	JSL Division 1	21	2			5	0	26	2
1990/91	Yamaha Motors	JSL Division 1	17	2			2	0	19	2
1992	Shimizu S-Pulse	J1 League	-		0	0	9	4	9	4
1993	Shimizu S-Pulse	J1 League	35	3	4	1	4	3	43	7
1994	Shimizu S-Pulse	J1 League	29	2	1	0	1	0	31	2
1995	Shimizu S-Pulse	J1 League	39	1	1	0	-		40	1
1996	Shimizu S-Pulse	J1 League	26	1	3	0	16	2	45	3
1997	Shimizu S-Pulse	J1 League	28	0	3	0	5	0	36	0
1998	Shimizu S-Pulse	J1 League	30	1	4	0	5	0	39	1
1999	Shimizu S-Pulse	J1 League	9	0	2	0	2	0	13	0
2000	Shimizu S-Pulse	J1 League	27	2	0	0	6	0	33	2
2001	Shimizu S-Pulse	J1 League	11	0	5	0	2	0	18	0
2002	Shimizu S-Pulse	J1 League	18	0	2	0	7	0	27	0
Total			306	16	25	1	64	9	395	26

== National team statistics ==
Japan national team
Year	Apps	Goals
1989	4	0
1990	1	0
Total	5	0

== Managerial statistics ==
Team	From	To	Record				
Team	From	To	G	W	D	L	Win %
Shimizu S-Pulse	2014	2015	39	8	9	22	20.51
Total			39	8	9	22	20.51
