= Kenta Hasegawa =

Japanese soccer player and manager (born 1965)

Kenta Hasegawa 長谷川 健太
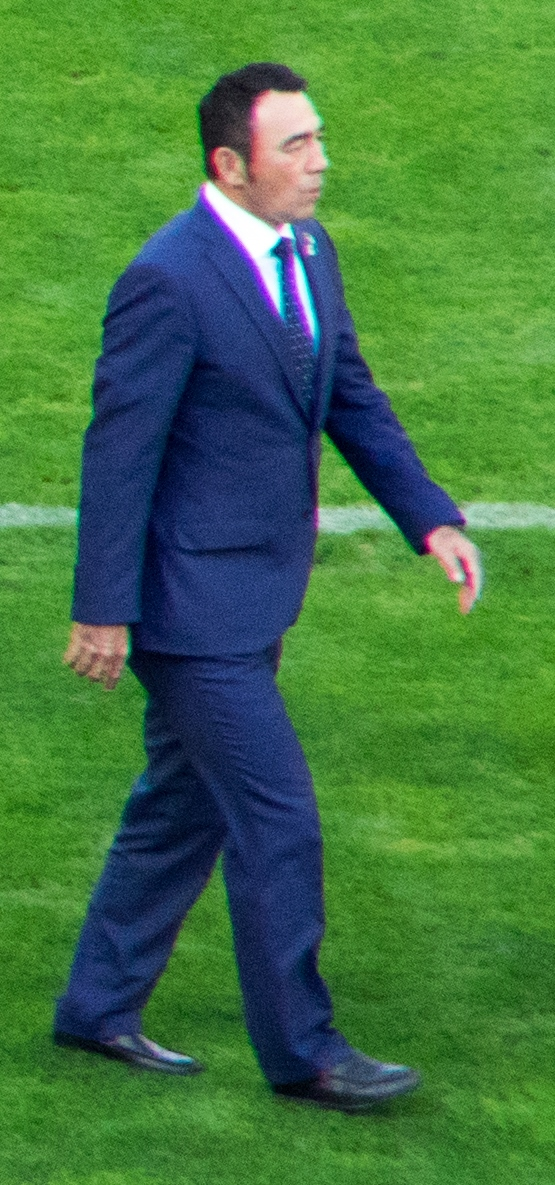

Personal information
- Full name: Kenta Hasegawa
- Date of birth: September 25, 1965 (age 61)
- Place of birth: Shizuoka, Shizuoka, Japan
- Height: 1.77 m (5 ft 10 in)
- Position: Forward

Youth career
- 1981–1983: Shimizu Higashi High School

College career
Years	Team	Apps	(Gls)
1984–1987	University of Tsukuba		

Senior career*
Years	Team	Apps	(Gls)
1988–1991	Nissan Motors	38	(10)
1992–1999	Shimizu S-Pulse	232	(45)
Total		270	(55)

International career
1989–1995	Japan	30	(4)

Managerial career
- 2005–2010: Shimizu S-Pulse
- 2013–2017: Gamba Osaka
- 2018–2021: FC Tokyo
- 2022–2025: Nagoya Grampus
Medal record
Yokohama Marinos
Winner	Japan Soccer League	1988/89
Winner	Japan Soccer League	1989/90
Runner-up	Japan Soccer League	1990/91
Winner	JSL Cup	1988
Winner	JSL Cup	1989
Winner	JSL Cup	1990
Winner	Emperor's Cup	1988
Winner	Emperor's Cup	1989
Runner-up	Emperor's Cup	1990
Shimizu S-Pulse
Runner-up	J1 League	1999
Winner	J.League Cup	1996
Runner-up	J.League Cup	1992
Runner-up	J.League Cup	1993
Runner-up	Emperor's Cup	1998
- * Club domestic league appearances and goals

Kenta Hasegawa (長谷川 健太, Hasegawa Kenta; born September 25, 1965) is a Japanese professional football manager and former player who is the manager of J1 League club of Nagoya Grampus.

== Club career ==
Hasegawa was educated at and played for Shimizu Higashi High School. He won the national high school championship with his teammates including Katsumi Oenoki and Takumi Horiike. He continued his study and football at University of Tsukuba where he won the Kanto University League title in 1987.

After graduating from the university in 1988, he joined Japan Soccer League side Nissan Motors (current Yokohama F. Marinos). He contributed to the club winning the Emperor's Cup twice in 1988 and 1989. When Japan's first-ever professional league J1 League started, Shimizu S-Pulse was founded in his local city. He joined the club in 1992 and re-united with his high school teammates Oenoki and Horiike. He helped the club to win the J.League Cup in 1996. He retired as a Shimizu player after the club won the second stage of the J1 League 1999 season. He played 207 league matches and scored 45 league goals in 7 seasons at Shimizu.

== International career ==
Hasegawa was capped 27 times and scored 4 goals for the Japan national team between 1989 and 1995. His first international appearance came on January 20, 1989 in a friendly against Iran in Teheran. He scored for the first time for his country on June 11, 1989 in a 1990 World Cup qualification against Indonesia at Nishigaoka Soccer Stadium in Tokyo. He was a member of the Japan squad who participated in the 1994 World Cup qualification for the 1994 World Cup. In the crucial last match, Hasegawa was substituted in the 59th minute by Masahiro Fukuda and watched from the bench a late Iraqi equaliser dashed Japan's hope to qualify for the finals in the US, the match that the Japanese fans now refer to as the Agony of Doha.

== Coaching career ==
After retiring from the game, Hasegawa started working as a pundit for national television NHK. He was also installed as the general manager of two university clubs, Hamamatsu University and Fuji Tokoha University (2000–2001). He became the manager of Hamamatsu University and lead them to win the Tokai University League title and the Shizuoka Prefectural qualification for the Emperor's Cup. He acquired the S-class coaching license that was required to manage a J1 League club in 2004 and became the manager of his old club Shimizu S-Pulse in 2005. The club struggled and narrowly escaped relegation in the 2005 season but they fought back strongly in the 2006 season and finished 4th in the league; a position equaled in 2007. In 2008 Hasegawa led S-Pulse to the final of the J.League Cup and a fifth-placed finish in the league, a placing which included them being the strongest performing team in the second half of the season. He was rewarded with an extended contract which will keep him at S-Pulse until 2010. He left Shimizu after he led the club to the final of 2010-11 Emperor's Cup when his contract was expired.

Hawegawa was appointed as a manager at J2 League club Gamba Osaka in 2013. The club won the champions in 2013 and was promoted to J1 League. In 2014, the club won all three major title in Japan; J1 League, J.League Cup and Emperor's Cup. He also was selected J.League Manager of the Year awards. In 2015, the club won the champions at Emperor's Cup and 2nd place at J1 League and J.League Cup. He resigned end of 2017 season.

In 2018, Hasegawa signed with FC Tokyo. In 2021, after a three year spell in which the club finished 6th, 2nd, 6th, and 9th in four respective seasons, Hasegawa resigned after an 8 - 0 loss to 2nd place Yokohama F. Marinos.

Shortly after the conclusion of the J1 league's 21/22 season, Hasegawa signed a contract with J1 league club Nagoya Grampus.

== Career statistics ==
=== Club ===
Club performance			League		Cup		League Cup		Total	
Season	Club	League	Apps	Goals	Apps	Goals	Apps	Goals	Apps	Goals
Japan			League		Emperor's Cup		J.League Cup		Total	
1988/89	Nissan Motors	JSL Division 1	18	4					18	4
1989/90	Nissan Motors	JSL Division 1	11	5			3	0	14	5
1990/91	Nissan Motors	JSL Division 1	4	0			4	0	8	0
1992	Shimizu S-Pulse	J1 League	-		3	0	10	2	13	2
1993	Shimizu S-Pulse	J1 League	36	10	4	1	1	0	41	11
1994	Shimizu S-Pulse	J1 League	44	9	1	1	1	0	46	10
1995	Shimizu S-Pulse	J1 League	21	3	0	0	-		21	3
1996	Shimizu S-Pulse	J1 League	24	7	3	2	16	7	43	16
1997	Shimizu S-Pulse	J1 League	30	5	1	0	6	2	37	7
1998	Shimizu S-Pulse	J1 League	31	9	5	2	5	0	41	11
1999	Shimizu S-Pulse	J1 League	21	2	2	1	2	1	25	3
Total			240	54	19	7	48	12	307	73

=== International ===
Japan national team
Year	Apps	Goals
1989	11	2
1990	6	1
1991	0	0
1992	0	0
1993	5	0
1994	2	0
1995	3	1
Total	27	4

=== Managerial ===
As of match played 5 July 2025

Managerial record by team and tenure
Team	From	To	Record				
Team	From	To	P	W	D	L	Win %
Shimizu S-Pulse	1 February 2005	31 January 2011	280	128	69	83	45.71
Gamba Osaka	1 February 2013	31 January 2018	251	125	58	68	49.80
FC Tokyo	1 February 2018	7 November 2021	182	86	35	61	47.25
Nagoya Grampus	1 February 2022	31 December 2025	169	69	42	58	40.83
Total			882	408	204	270	46.26

== In popular culture ==
In popular manga and anime series Chibi Maruko-chan, a boy called Kenta kun occasionally makes an appearance. He loves football and is a classmate of title character Chibi Maruko. Momoko Sakura, the author of the manga, created this character after Hasegawa. Sakura and Hasegawa attended the same primary school during the same period.

== Honours ==
=== As a coach ===
Gamba Osaka

- J.League Division 1: 2014
- J.League Division 2: 2013
- J.League Cup: 2014
- Emperor's Cup: 2014
- Emperor's Cup: 2015
- Japanese Super Cup: 2015

FC Tokyo

- J.League Cup: 2020

Nagoya Grampus

- J.League Cup: 2024

Individual

- J.League Manager of the Year: 2014
