= Tatsuru Mukojima =

Japanese footballer (born 1966)

Tatsuru Mukojima 向島 建
Personal information
- Full name: Tatsuru Mukojima
- Date of birth: January 9, 1966 (age 60)
- Place of birth: Shizuoka, Japan
- Height: 1.61 m (5 ft 3 1/2 in)
- Position: Forward

Youth career
- 1981–1983: Shizuoka Gakuen High School
- 1984–1987: Kokushikan University

Senior career*
Years	Team	Apps	(Gls)
1988–1992	Toshiba	85	(10)
1992–1996	Shimizu S-Pulse	85	(15)
1997–2001	Kawasaki Frontale	70	(14)
Total		240	(39)
Medal record
Shimizu S-Pulse
Winner	J.League Cup	1996
Runner-up	J.League Cup	1992
Runner-up	J.League Cup	1993
Kawasaki Frontale
Runner-up	J.League Cup	2000
- * Club domestic league appearances and goals

Tatsuru Mukojima (向島 建, Mukojima Tatsuru; born January 9, 1966) is a former Japanese football player.

== Playing career ==
Mukojima was born in Shizuoka Prefecture on January 9, 1966. After graduating from Kokushikan University, he joined Toshiba in 1988. He played as regular player first season. In 1992, he moved to new club Shimizu S-Pulse based in his local. He played many matches from first season and the club won the 2nd place in the 1992 and 1993 J.League Cup. However his opportunity to play decreased in 1996 and he moved to Japan Football League club Kawasaki Frontale in 1997. The club was promoted to J2 League in 1999 and J1 League in 2000. He retired end of 2001 season.

== Club statistics ==
Club performance			League		Cup		League Cup		Total	
Season	Club	League	Apps	Goals	Apps	Goals	Apps	Goals	Apps	Goals
Japan			League		Emperor's Cup		J.League Cup		Total	
1988/89	Toshiba	JSL Division 2	24	5			5	1	29	6
1989/90	Toshiba	JSL Division 1	20	2			2	0	22	2
1990/91	Toshiba	JSL Division 1	22	3			2	0	24	3
1991/92	Toshiba	JSL Division 1	19	0			2	0	21	0
1992	Shimizu S-Pulse	J1 League	-		3	0	11	2	14	2
1993	Shimizu S-Pulse	J1 League	30	8	0	0	4	1	34	9
1994	Shimizu S-Pulse	J1 League	20	2	1	0	0	0	21	2
1995	Shimizu S-Pulse	J1 League	29	2	0	0	-		29	2
1996	Shimizu S-Pulse	J1 League	6	3	0	0	1	0	7	3
1997	Kawasaki Frontale	Football League	21	10	2	0	-		23	10
1998	Kawasaki Frontale	Football League	14	2	2	1	1	0	17	3
1999	Kawasaki Frontale	J2 League	16	0	3	1	0	0	19	1
2000	Kawasaki Frontale	J1 League	8	1	1	0	1	0	10	1
2001	Kawasaki Frontale	J2 League	11	1	1	0	1	0	13	1
Total			240	39	10	2	30	4	280	45
