= Toninho (footballer, born 1965) =

Brazilian footballer

Personal information
- Full name: Antônio Benedito da Silva
- Date of birth: March 23, 1965 (age 61)
- Place of birth: Brazil
- Height: 1.86 m (6 ft 1 in)
- Position: Striker

Senior career*
Years	Team	Apps	(Gls)
- XV Novembro-Jaú
1985–1989	Portuguesa Desportos	87	(24)
- Guarani
1991–1992	Yomiuri		
1992–1996	Shimizu S-Pulse		
1995	→Urawa Reds (loan)		
	Vasco da Gama	11	(2)

International career
1989	Brazil	1	(0)
- * Club domestic league appearances and goals

Antônio Benedito da Silva (born March 23, 1965), nicknamed Toninho, is a former Brazilian football player who played for Portuguesa (Brazil), Guarani (Brazil), Yomiuri (Japan), Shimizu S-Pulse (Japan), Urawa Red Diamonds (Japan) and Vasco da Gama (Brazil). He played for the Brazil national team one time.

== Club statistics ==
Club performance			League		Cup		League Cup		Total	
Season	Club	League	Apps	Goals	Apps	Goals	Apps	Goals	Apps	Goals
Japan			League		Emperor's Cup		J.League Cup		Total	
1991/92	Yomiuri	JSL Division 1	22	18	5	0	5	10	32	28
1992	Shimizu S-Pulse	J1 League	-		2	1	11	3	13	4
1993	Shimizu S-Pulse	J1 League	6	3	0	0	0	0	6	3
1994	Shimizu S-Pulse	J1 League	44	22	1	0	0	0	45	22
1995	Shimizu S-Pulse	J1 League	25	11	0	0	-		25	11
1995	Urawa Reds	J1 League	26	6	2	0	-		28	6
1996	Shimizu S-Pulse	J1 League	4	1	0	0	3	0	7	1
Total			127	61	5	1	19	13	151	75

== National team statistics ==
Brazil national team
Year	Apps	Goals
1989	1	0
Total	1	0

== Honors ==
- Campeonato Paulista Top Scorer: 1989 with 12 goals
- Japan Soccer League Top Scorer: 1991-92 with 18 goals in 22 games
- Japan Soccer League Best Eleven: 1991-92

== Trivia ==
- His younger brother is Sonny Anderson.
