= Edu Manga =

Brazilian footballer (1967–2025)

Personal information
- Full name: Eduardo Antônio dos Santos
- Date of birth: 2 February 1967
- Place of birth: Osasco, São Paulo, Brazil
- Date of death: 3 October 2025 (aged 58)
- Place of death: Barueri, São Paulo, Brazil
- Height: 1.85 m (6 ft 1 in)
- Position: Midfielder

Senior career*
Years	Team	Apps	(Gls)
1985–1989	Palmeiras		
1989–1992	América	89	(40)
1992–1993	Corinthians		
1993	Shimizu S-Pulse	32	(13)
1994	América	6	(1)
1994–1995	Emelec	12	(2)
1996	Athletico Paranaense		
1996–1997	Valladolid	50	(0)
1998	Universidad Católica	11	(2)
1999–2000	Logroñés	9	(0)
2001	Sport Recife	17	(5)
2001	Remo	8	(1)
2002	Náutico		
2002	Figueirense	4	(0)

International career
1987–1989	Brazil	10	(0)
- * Club domestic league appearances and goals

Eduardo Antônio dos Santos (2 February 1967 – 3 October 2025), commonly known as Edu Manga, was a Brazilian professional footballer who played as a midfielder. He was also part of Brazil's squad for the 1987 Copa América tournament. Manga died from kidney disease in Barueri, São Paulo, on 3 October 2025, at the age of 58.

== Teams ==
- (Brazil) Palmeiras 1985–1989
- (Mexico) América 1989–1992
- (Brazil) Corinthians 1992–1993
- (Japan) Shimizu S-Pulse 1993
- (Mexico) América 1994
- (Ecuador) Emelec 1994–1995
- (Brazil) Athletico Paranaense 1996
- (Spain) Valladolid 1996–1997
- (Chile) Universidad Católica 1998
- (Spain) Logroñés 1999–2000
- (Brazil) Sport Recife 2001
- (Brazil) Remo 2001
- (Brazil) Náutico 2002
- (Brazil) Figueirense 2002

== Career statistics ==
=== Club ===
Appearances and goals by club, season and competition
Club	Season	League			National cup		League cup		Total	
Club	Season	Division	Apps	Goals	Apps	Goals	Apps	Goals	Apps	Goals
Shimizu S-Pulse	1993	J1 League	32	13	2	2	5	3	39	18
Total			32	13	2	2	5	3	39	18

=== International ===
Appearances and goals by national team and year
National team	Year	Apps	Goals
Brazil	1987	2	0
Brazil	1988	3	0
Brazil	1989	5	0
Total		10	0
