= Marco Antônio (footballer, born 1963) =

Brazilian footballer

Marco Antonio
Personal information
- Full name: Marco Antônio Paes dos Santos
- Date of birth: August 20, 1963 (age 63)
- Place of birth: Brazil
- Height: 1.90 m (6 ft 3 in)
- Position: Defender

Senior career*
Years	Team	Apps	(Gls)
1992–1993	Shimizu S-Pulse		
- * Club domestic league appearances and goals

Marco Antônio Paes dos Santos (born 20 August 1963) is a former Brazilian football player.

== Playing career ==
He was a defender for Sport Club do Recife winning the Campeonato Brasileiro 1987, and author of the goal in the victory over Guarani by 1 x 0 in Ilha do Retiro, making him one of the biggest idols of the club's history.

He joined Japanese J1 League club Shimizu S-Pulse in 1992. He played all matches in 1992 J.League Cup and S-Pulse won the 2nd place. He played many matches in 1993 season too. S-Pulse won the 3rd place in 1993 J.League and the 2nd place in 1993 J.League Cup for 2 years in a row. He left the club end of 1993 season.

== Japan statistics ==
Club performance			League		Cup		League Cup		Total	
Season	Club	League	Apps	Goals	Apps	Goals	Apps	Goals	Apps	Goals
Japan			League		Emperor's Cup		J.League Cup		Total	
1992	Shimizu S-Pulse	J1 League	-		3	1	11	1	14	2
1993	Shimizu S-Pulse	J1 League	18	0	4	1	7	2	29	3
Total			18	0	7	2	18	3	43	5
