= Celso Luis Gomes =

Brazilian footballer (born 1964)

Personal information
- Full name: Celso Luis Gomes
- Date of birth: 2 September 1964 (age 62)
- Place of birth: Três Corações, Minas Gerais, Brazil
- Height: 1.84 m (6 ft 1/2 in)
- Position: Defender

Senior career*
Years	Team	Apps	(Gls)
1993	Shimizu S-Pulse		
- * Club domestic league appearances and goals

Celso Luis Gomes (born 2 September 1964) is a former Brazilian football player.

== Club statistics ==
Club performance			League		Cup		League Cup		Total	
Season	Club	League	Apps	Goals	Apps	Goals	Apps	Goals	Apps	Goals
Japan			League		Emperor's Cup		J.League Cup		Total	
1993	Shimizu S-Pulse	J1 League	8	0	0	0	0	0	8	0
Total			8	0	0	0	0	0	8	0
