= Marcão (footballer, born 1969) =

Brazilian footballer

Personal information
- Full name: Marcos Fernando Nangi
- Date of birth: 16 March 1969 (age 57)
- Place of birth: São Paulo
- Height: 1.83 m (6 ft 0 in)
- Position: Striker

Senior career*
| Years | Team | Apps | (Gls) |
| 1989–1991 | Ponte Preta | | |
| 1991–1992 | Goiânia | | |
| 1992–1993 | CSA | | |
| 1993 | Goiás | | |
| 1993 | Shimizu S-Pulse | | |
| 1994–1995 | Piracicaba | | |
| 1994 | → Grêmio (loan) | | |
| 1995–1997 | Penafiel | | |
| 1997–1998 | Gil Vicente | | |
| 1998–2000 | Varzim | | |
| 2000–2002 | Os Belenenses | | |
| 2002–2003 | Varzim | | |
- * Club domestic league appearances and goals

Marcos Fernando Nangi (born 16 March 1969), also known as Marcão, is a former Brazilian football player.

== Playing career ==
In November 1993, Marcão joined Japanese J1 League club Shimizu S-Pulse when there are a few remaining games in 1993 season. On December 1, he debuted in J1 against Verdy Kawasaki. He played 2 matches in 1993 season and left the club end of 1993 season.

== Club statistics ==
| Club performance | | | League | | Cup | | League Cup | | Total | |
| Season | Club | League | Apps | Goals | Apps | Goals | Apps | Goals | Apps | Goals |
| Japan | | | League | | Emperor's Cup | | J.League Cup | | Total | |
|---|---|---|---|---|---|---|---|---|---|---|
| 1993 | Shimizu S-Pulse | J1 League | 2 | 0 | 0 | 0 | 0 | 0 | 2 | 0 |
| Total | | | 2 | 0 | 0 | 0 | 0 | 0 | 2 | 0 |

== Honours ==
Varzim

- Liga2 Portugal top goalscorer (2): 1998–1999, 1999-2000
