= Yasushi Kawakami =

Japanese footballer (born 1963)

Personal information
- Date of birth: 8 May 1963 (age 63)
- Place of birth: Okinawa, Japan
- Height: 1.68 m (5 ft 6 in)
- Positions: Midfielder; forward

Senior career*
Years	Team	Apps	(Gls)
1982–1987	Banfield		
1987–1989	All Nippon Airways		
1989–1992	Chuo Bohan		
1992	Shimizu S-Pulse		

Managerial career
- 1996–2006: Argentina (women) (assistant coach)
- 2008: Argentina U20 (women)
- * Club domestic league appearances and goals

Yasushi Kawakami (川上 靖, Kawakami Yasushi; born 8 May 1963) is a Japanese former football player, coach and manager.

== Playing career ==
Kawakami was born in Okinawa, Japan. His family emigrated to Argentina in 1968, when he was five years old. He signed with Banfield in 1982, becoming the first Japanese footballer to play in the Argentine league. He played eight matches and scored one goal in the Argentine second division. A goal scored by him against All Boys on 20 July 1985 was the first goal scored by a Japanese player in the Argentine league until Naohiro Takahara scored in 2001.

In 1987, he returned to Japan and signed with All Nippon Airways in the Japan Soccer League. From 1989, he played for Chuo Bohan and Shimizu S-Pulse. He retired from playing in 1992.

== Managerial career ==
After retirement, Kawakami started coaching career in Argentina. He was the technical director of the Argentina women's national team from 1999 to 2012. He also served as the assistant coach for Argentina women's national team from 1996 to 2006. He helped the national team qualify for their first FIFA Women's World Cup in 2003 with manager Carlos Borrello. In 2008, he became a manager for Argentina U-20 women's national team and managed the team in 2008 FIFA U-20 Women's World Cup.
