= Nobuhiro Takeda =

Japanese footballer

Nobuhiro Takeda 武田 修宏
Personal information
- Full name: Nobuhiro Takeda
- Date of birth: May 10, 1967 (age 59)
- Place of birth: Hamamatsu, Shizuoka, Japan
- Height: 1.77 m (5 ft 9 1/2 in)
- Position: Forward

Youth career
- 1983–1985: Shimizu Higashi High School

Senior career*
| Years | Team | Apps | (Gls) |
| 1986–1997 | Verdy Kawasaki | 243 | (108) |
| 1996 | → Júbilo Iwata (loan) | 24 | (4) |
| 1997 | Kyoto Purple Sanga | 16 | (9) |
| 1998–1999 | JEF United Ichihara | 57 | (19) |
| 2000–2001 | Tokyo Verdy | 19 | (2) |
| 2000 | → Sportivo Luqueño (loan) | 2 | (0) |
| Total | | 359 | (142) |

International career
| 1987–1994 | Japan | 18 | (1) |
Medal record
Tokyo Verdy
| Winner | Japan Soccer League | 1986/87 |
| Winner | Japan Soccer League | 1990/91 |
| Winner | Japan Soccer League | 1991/92 |
| Runner-up | Japan Soccer League | 1989/90 |
| Winner | J1 League | 1993 |
| Winner | J1 League | 1994 |
| Runner-up | J1 League | 1995 |
| Winner | JSL Cup | 1991 |
| Winner | J.League Cup | 1992 |
| Winner | J.League Cup | 1993 |
| Winner | J.League Cup | 1994 |
| Winner | Emperor's Cup | 1986 |
| Winner | Emperor's Cup | 1987 |
| Runner-up | Emperor's Cup | 1991 |
| Runner-up | Emperor's Cup | 1992 |
JEF United Ichihara
| Runner-up | J.League Cup | 1998 |
Representing Japan
AFC Asian Cup
| Gold medal – first place | 1992 Japan |
- * Club domestic league appearances and goals

Nobuhiro Takeda (武田 修宏, Takeda Nobuhiro; born 10 May 1967) is a Japanese former football player. He played for Japan national team. He was a forward and known as an opportunistic goal-scorer, making most of his quick thinking and canny positioning. He currently works at Nippon Television and belongs to an entertainment agency Horipro as a sportscaster. Takeda is also an influential businessman and player agent in Japanese.

== Club career ==
Takeda was educated at and played for Shimizu Higashi High School. He joined Japan Soccer League side Yomiuri in 1986. When Japan's first professional league J1 League started in 1993, Yomiuri was transformed to Verdy Kawasaki for whom he continued to play. His partnership with Kazuyoshi Miura up front was one of the key elements that brought successes to the club in the late 1980s and early 1990s. He was transferred to Júbilo Iwata for the 1996 season but came back to Verdy (1997), then moved to Kyoto Purple Sanga (July 1997-December 1997), JEF United Ichihara (1998–1999), again Verdy (2000), Paraguayan side Sportivo Luqueño (June 2000-December 2000), where he made two appearances for the club under coach Raul Vicente Amarilla, and finished his playing career at Verdy (2001).

== National team career ==
Takeda played 18 times for the Japan national team between 1987 and 1994. He made his international debut on April 8, 1987 in a 1988 Summer Olympics qualification against Indonesia at the Tokyo National Stadium. He scored his sole international goal in the match. He was a member of the Japan team that won the 1992 Asian Cup but he did not play in the tournament.

Under national coach Hans Ooft, Japan reached the 1994 World Cup qualification final stage for the 1994 World Cup. He was on the pitch, after replacing Masashi Nakayama in the 81st minute, when Japan's hope to play in the finals in the USA was dashed by an injury-time Iraqi equaliser in the last qualifier, the match that the Japanese fans now refer to as the Agony of Doha.

== Away from football ==
He took part in Sasuke (TV series) #38 in December 2020, and failed at Stage 1 (the Rolling Hill).

== Club statistics ==
| Club performance | | | League | | Cup | | League Cup | | Total | |
| Season | Club | League | Apps | Goals | Apps | Goals | Apps | Goals | Apps | Goals |
| Japan | | | League | | Emperor's Cup | | J.League Cup | | Total | |
|---|---|---|---|---|---|---|---|---|---|---|
| 1986/87 | Yomiuri | JSL Division 1 | 22 | 11 | 0 | 0 | 5 | 3 | 27 | 14 |
| 1987/88 | Yomiuri | JSL Division 1 | 21 | 5 | 4 | 0 | 1 | 0 | 26 | 5 |
| 1988/89 | Yomiuri | JSL Division 1 | 15 | 4 | 3 | 2 | 3 | 0 | 21 | 6 |
| 1989/90 | Yomiuri | JSL Division 1 | 22 | 13 | 4 | 1 | 4 | 1 | 30 | 15 |
| 1990/91 | Yomiuri | JSL Division 1 | 22 | 9 | 1 | 0 | 2 | 0 | 25 | 9 |
| 1991/92 | Yomiuri | JSL Division 1 | 20 | 6 | 5 | 5 | 5 | 5 | 30 | 16 |
| 1992 | Verdy Kawasaki | J1 League | - | | 5 | 1 | 11 | 4 | 16 | 5 |
| 1993 | Verdy Kawasaki | J1 League | 36 | 17 | 3 | 0 | 1 | 0 | 40 | 17 |
| 1994 | Verdy Kawasaki | J1 League | 40 | 23 | 0 | 0 | 3 | 1 | 43 | 24 |
| 1995 | Verdy Kawasaki | J1 League | 41 | 20 | 1 | 1 | - | | 42 | 21 |
| 1996 | Júbilo Iwata | J1 League | 24 | 4 | 1 | 0 | 14 | 2 | 39 | 6 |
| 1997 | Verdy Kawasaki | J1 League | 4 | 0 | 0 | 0 | 6 | 1 | 10 | 1 |
| 1997 | Kyoto Purple Sanga | J1 League | 16 | 9 | 2 | 1 | 0 | 0 | 18 | 10 |
| 1998 | JEF United Ichihara | J1 League | 33 | 13 | 1 | 0 | 6 | 2 | 40 | 15 |
| 1999 | JEF United Ichihara | J1 League | 24 | 6 | 0 | 0 | 2 | 1 | 26 | 7 |
| 2000 | Verdy Kawasaki | J1 League | 0 | 0 | 0 | 0 | 1 | 0 | 1 | 0 |
| 2001 | Tokyo Verdy | J1 League | 19 | 2 | 0 | 0 | 2 | 0 | 21 | 2 |
| Total | | | 359 | 142 | 35 | 14 | 61 | 17 | 455 | 173 |

== National team statistics ==
Japan national team
| Year | Apps | Goals |
|---|---|---|
| 1987 | 4 | 1 |
| 1988 | 0 | 0 |
| 1989 | 0 | 0 |
| 1990 | 4 | 0 |
| 1991 | 2 | 0 |
| 1992 | 2 | 0 |
| 1993 | 4 | 0 |
| 1994 | 2 | 0 |
| Total | 18 | 1 |

== Honors and awards ==
=== Team honors ===
- 1992 Asian Cup (Champions)

== Video games ==
- Takeda Nobuhiro no Super Cup Soccer - Super Famicom videogame, released November 26, 1993
- Takeda Nobuhiro no Ace Striker - Game Boy videogame, released February 18, 1994
- Takeda Nobuhiro no Super League Soccer - Super Famicom videogame, released November 25, 1994
