= Shizuo Takada =

Japanese football referee (born 1947)

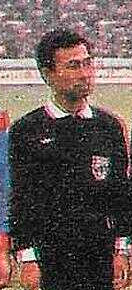
- Takada in the 1986 Intercontinental Cup
- Full name: Shizuo Takada
- Born: August 5, 1947 (age 79); Japan

International
Years	League	Role
1980s–1990	FIFA listed	Referee

Shizuo Takada (高田 静夫, Takada Shizuo; born August 5, 1947) is a Japanese former football referee. He refereed a first round match between Spain and Algeria in the 1986 FIFA World Cup. He also officiated a first round match between Yugoslavia and UAE in the 1990 FIFA World Cup.

== Honours ==
- Japan Football Hall of Fame: Inducted in 2013

Preceded by AFC Asian Cup Final 1980 (Indonesia) Sudarso Hardjowasito	AFC Asian Cup Final Referees; 1984 (Japan) Shizuo Takada	Succeeded by AFC Asian Cup Final 1988 (France) Michel Vautrot
