= Kusanagi Athletic Stadium =

Athletic stadium in Shizuoka, Japan

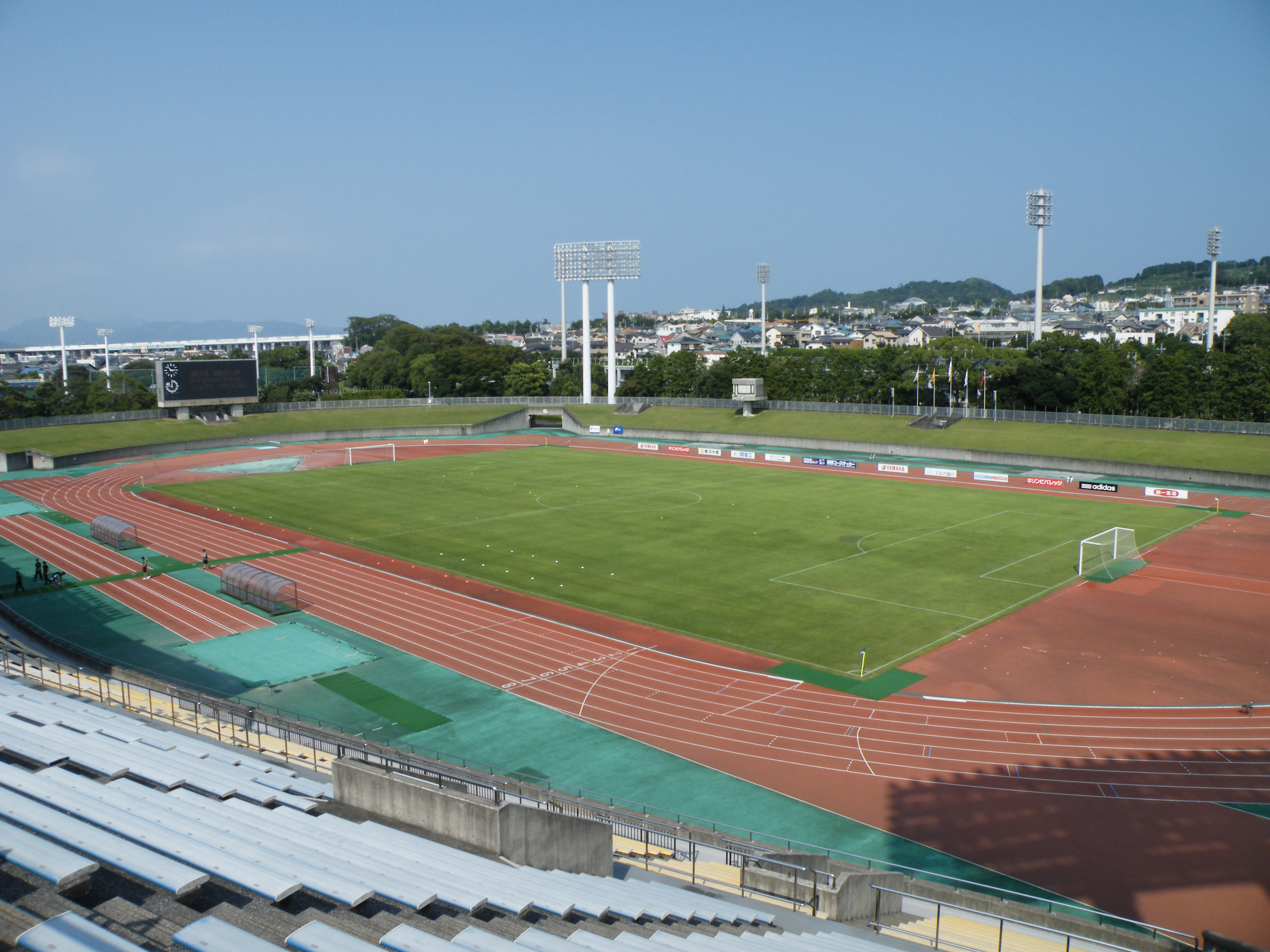
- Interactive map of Kusanagi Athletic Stadium
- Location: Shizuoka, Shizuoka, Japan
- Coordinates: 34°59′18.59″N 138°25′49.22″E
- Owner: Shizuoka Prefecture
- Capacity: 28,000

Construction
- Opened: 1957

Kusanagi Athletic Stadium (静岡県草薙総合運動場陸上競技場, Shizuokaken Kusanagi sougou undoujyou rikujyou kyougijyou) is an athletic stadium in Shizuoka, Shizuoka, Japan. It is part of the Kusanagi Sport Complex, which includes Kusanagi Baseball Stadium, Konohana Arena, and others.

The stadium comprises the Main Stand of 8,000 seats, with grass banking on the remaining three sides. The Back Stand opposite the Main Stand can accommodate 12,000, with the remaining ends 4,000 each.

== Football usage ==
In addition to athletics, the stadium has been utilised for matches by J.League football teams Shimizu S-Pulse, Júbilo Iwata and Fujieda MYFC.

Shimizu S-Pulse used the ground extensively in the 1990s, largely sharing home stadium duties with Nihondaira Stadium at the dawn of the J.League in 1992. S-Pulse called Kusanagi home while Nihondaira was being expanded in 1994, and its pitch re-laid in 2003. However, Shimizu have not used the stadium for competitive games since 2003.
