= Shimizu Higashi High School =

Japanese high school

Coordinates: 35°1′46″N 138°28′47.8″E

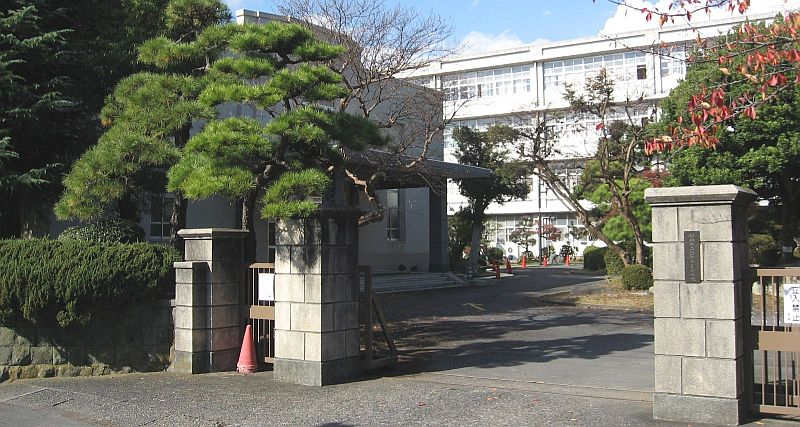
- Shizuoka Prefecture; Japan

Information
- Type: High school
- Established: 1923
- Principal: Hideki Ijima
- Affiliation: Prefectural
- Website: https://www.edu.pref.shizuoka.jp/shimizuhigashi-h/

Shimizu Higashi High School (静岡県立清水東高等学校, Shizuoka Kenritsu Shimizu-Higashi Kōtōgakkō) is a prefectural high school located in Shimizu ward in Shizuoka city, Shizuoka Prefecture, Japan. The school is designated as a Super Science High School by the Ministry of Education, Culture, Sports, Science, and Technology (MEXT).

== Notable alumni ==
A number of professional soccer players have graduated from Shimizu Higashi High School. These include: Ryuichi Sugiyama, Kenta Hasegawa, Katsumi Oenoki, Nobuhiro Takeda, Naoki Soma, Akinori Nishizawa, Naohiro Takahara, Atsuto Uchida, among many others.

== History ==
- 1923 - The school received approval from the Ministry of Education to establish a middle school in Ihara, Shizuoka Prefecture, area.
- 1924 - The school was opened as a middle school in the Ihara area.
- 1939 - The school was renamed as Shimizu.
- 1948 - The school system was reformed by Daiichi Shimizu, Shizuoka Prefecture. Part-time courses were established for the students.
- 1968 - Science and mathematics department was established.
