= Masayoshi Okada =

Japanese football referee (born 1958)

Masayoshi Okada (岡田 正義, Okada Masayoshi; born May 24, 1958 in Tokyo) is a Japanese football referee. He refereed a first round match between England and Tunisia in the 1998 FIFA World Cup.
