= 1990–91 Japan Soccer League =

Japan Soccer League
- Season: 1990-91
- Teams: 12
- Champions: Yomiuri; 4th title
- Runner up: Nissan Motors
- Matches: 132
- Goals: 287 (2.17 per match)
- Top goalscorer: Renato; Tsuyoshi Kitazawa; Tetsuya Totsuka (10 goals)

Both divisions of the Japan Soccer League were given the 3-1-0 league format.

== League tables ==
=== First Division ===
Yomiuri SC won its fourth JSL title and went to the Asian Club Championship. Nissan Motors, by virtue of its Emperor's Cup win, represented Japan for the first time in the Asian Cup Winners' Cup.

Yanmar Diesel, four-time champions in the 1970s, were relegated for the first time after an aimless decade. Nippon Kokan, who two seasons before was contending for the title, were relegated as well and would cease to exist by the middle of the decade.

Pos	Team	Pld	W	D	L	GF	GA	GD	Pts	Qualification or relegation
1	Yomiuri SC	22	15	4	3	41	16	+25	49	1991–92 Asian Club Championship
2	Nissan Motors	22	11	9	2	27	10	+17	42	1991–92 Asian Cup Winners' Cup
3	Honda	22	10	8	4	29	21	+8	38	
4	Toshiba	22	8	8	6	26	24	+2	32	
5	Toyota Motors	22	7	9	6	26	27	−1	30	
6	Matsushita	22	7	9	6	24	26	−2	30	
7	ANA Club	22	7	6	9	24	24	0	27	
8	Yamaha Motors	22	6	7	9	21	22	−1	25	
9	Furukawa Electric	22	5	10	7	22	24	−2	25	
10	Mitsubishi Motors	22	6	6	10	18	23	−5	24	
11	Yanmar Diesel	22	5	5	12	13	31	−18	20	Relegated to Second Division
12	Nippon Kokan	22	2	5	15	16	39	−23	11	Relegated to Second Division

Source: RSSSF

==== Topscorers ====
Rank	Player	Goals
1	(Brazil) Renato (Nissan Motors) (Japan) Tetsuya Totsuka (Yomiuri Club) (Japan) Tsuyoshi Kitazawa (Honda Motor)	10
4	(Japan) Nobuhiro Takeda (Yomiuri Club)	9
5	(Brazil) Jorginho Putinatti (Toyota Motor Corporation) (Japan) Akihiro Nagashima (Matsushita Electric)	8

=== Second Division ===
Struggling fallen giants Hitachi and Mazda were promoted back to the top flight after a few seasons of second division wilderness: Hitachi at the first attempt, Mazda on the third.

Nippon Steel, co-founder of the First Division in 1965, was relegated, leaving only five JSL founding clubs that would professionalize for the J.League. Osaka Gas, who never looked like national league material, joined them.

Pos	Team	Pld	W	D	L	GF	GA	GD	Pts	Promotion or relegation
1	Hitachi	30	27	1	2	102	19	+83	82	Promoted to First Division
2	Mazda	30	24	2	4	76	17	+59	74	Promoted to First Division
3	Fujita Engineering	30	21	7	2	60	15	+45	70	
4	Sumitomo	30	15	6	9	43	24	+19	51	
5	Fujitsu	30	15	6	9	46	30	+16	51	
6	NTT Kanto	30	16	3	11	43	41	+2	51	
7	Kawasaki Steel	30	15	4	11	37	41	−4	49	
8	Yomiuri SC Juniors	30	11	7	12	37	38	−1	40	
9	Tanabe Pharmaceuticals	30	12	4	14	39	41	−2	40	
10	Otsuka Pharmaceutical	30	11	2	17	32	44	−12	35	
11	Cosmo Oil Yokkaichi	30	9	7	14	26	39	−13	34	
12	Kofu Club	30	10	4	16	37	57	−20	34	
13	Kyoto Shiko Club	30	8	7	15	42	62	−20	31	
14	Toho Titanium	30	4	6	20	13	41	−28	18	
15	Osaka Gas	30	2	6	22	14	62	−48	12	Relegated to Regional Leagues
16	Nippon Steel	30	3	2	25	18	94	−76	11	Relegated to Regional Leagues

Source: RSSSF
