= 1993 J.League Cup =

J.League Yamazaki Nabisco Cup

Tournament details
- Country: Japan
- Dates: 10 September and 23 November 1993
- Teams: 13

Final positions
- Champions: Verdy Kawasaki (2nd title)
- Runners-up: Shimizu S-Pulse
- Semifinalists: Yokohama Flügels; Gamba Osaka

Tournament statistics
- Matches played: 40

The 1993 J. League Cup, officially the '93 J.League Yamazaki Nabisco Cup, was the 19th edition of Japan soccer league cup tournament and the second edition under the current J. League Cup format. The championship started on September 10 and finished on November 23, 1993.

== Group stage ==
=== Group A ===
Team	Pld	W	L	GF	GA	GD
Verdy Kawasaki	6	4	2	13	9	+4
Gamba Osaka	6	4	2	15	13	+2
Kashima Antlers	6	4	2	10	8	+2
Kashiwa Reysol	6	4	2	9	9	0
JEF Ichihara	6	2	4	10	8	+2
Bellmare Hiratsuka	6	2	4	10	13	−3
Sanfrecce Hiroshima	6	1	5	6	13	−7

=== Group B ===
Team	Pld	W	L	GF	GA	GD
Shimizu S-Pulse	5	4	1	13	6	+7
Yokohama Flügels	5	4	1	8	6	+2
Júbilo Iwata	5	2	3	9	7	+2
Nagoya Grampus	5	2	3	9	9	0
Yokohama Marinos	5	2	3	7	13	−6
Urawa Red Diamonds	5	1	4	7	12	−5

== Knockout phase ==
Semifinals; October 23
A1	Verdy Kawasaki	2
B2	Yokohama Flügels	1
B1	Shimizu S-Pulse	4
A2	Gamba Osaka	2

Final; November 23
A1	Verdy Kawasaki	2
B1	Shimizu S-Pulse	1

=== Final ===
November 23 13:03

Verdy Kawasaki	2–1	Shimizu S-Pulse
Bismarck 73'; Kitazawa 85'		Oenoki 13'

National Stadium
Attendance: 53,677
