= 1992 Emperor's Cup final =

1992 Emperor's Cup Final
Yokohama Marinos	Verdy Kawasaki
2	1
- Date: January 1, 1993
- Venue: National Stadium, Tokyo

1992 Emperor's Cup Final was the 72nd final of the Emperor's Cup competition. The final was played at National Stadium in Tokyo on January 1, 1993. Yokohama Marinos won the championship.

== Overview ==
Defending champion Yokohama Marinos won their 6th title, by defeating Verdy Kawasaki 2–1 with Takashi Mizunuma and Takuya Jinno goal.

== Match details ==
January 1, 1993

Yokohama Marinos	2–1	Verdy Kawasaki
Takashi Mizunuma 74'; Takuya Jinno 102'		Tadashi Nakamura 83'

National Stadium

Yokohama Marinos
GK	1	(Japan) Shigetatsu Matsunaga
DF	3	(Japan) Norio Omura
DF	4	(Japan) Masami Ihara
DF	13	(Japan) Kunio Nagayama
DF	15	(Japan) Masaharu Suzuki
DF	5	(Japan) Junji Koizumi
MF	7	(Brazil) Everton
MF	8	(Japan) Takashi Mizunuma
MF	10	(Japan) Kazushi Kimura
MF	22	(Japan) Takahiro Yamada
FW	9	(Brazil) Renato	(substituted off) 90'
Substitutes:
	16	(Japan) Takeshi Urakami
	6	(Japan) Toshinobu Katsuya
	18	(Japan) Satoru Noda
	20	(Japan) Rikizo Matsuhashi
	19	(Japan) Takuya Jinno	(substituted on) 90'
Manager:
(Japan) Hidehiko Shimizu

Verdy Kawasaki
GK	1	(Japan) Shinkichi Kikuchi
DF	2	(Japan) Hisashi Kato
DF	6	(Japan) Satoshi Tsunami
DF	13	(Japan) Ko Ishikawa
DF	15	(Brazil) Pereira
MF	5	(Japan) Tetsuji Hashiratani
MF	10	(Japan) Ruy Ramos
MF	17	(Japan) Hideki Nagai	(substituted off) 64'
MF	21	(Japan) Tadashi Nakamura
FW	9	(Japan) Nobuhiro Takeda
FW	11	(Japan) Miura Kazuyoshi
Substitutes:
	18	(Japan) Takayuki Fujikawa
	4	(Japan) Hirokazu Sasaki
	3	(Japan) Yoshiyuki Kato
	8	(Japan) Tetsuya Totsuka
	20	(Brazil) Paulinho	(substituted on) 64'
Manager:
(Brazil) Pepe

== See also ==
- 1992 Emperor's Cup
