= 1994 Verdy Kawasaki season =

Verdy Kawasaki
1994 season
- Manager: Yasutarō Matsuki
- Stadium: Kawasaki Todoroki Stadium
- J.League: Champions (→Asian Club Championship)
- Emperor's Cup: 2nd Round
- J.League Cup: Champions
- Super Cup: Winner
- Sanwa Bank Cup: Winner
- 1993–94 Asian Club Championship: 3rd
- 1994–95 Asian Club Championship: Quarterfinals
- Top goalscorer: League: Nobuhiro Takeda (23); All: Nobuhiro Takeda (25)
- Highest home attendance: 15,554 (vs Sanfrecce Hiroshima, 2 November 1994); 54,657 (vs Júbilo Iwata, 19 March 1994, Tokyo National Stadium)
- Lowest home attendance: 10,571 (vs Sanfrecce Hiroshima, 18 May 1994)
- Average home league attendance: 24,926
Home colours	Away colours

1994 Verdy Kawasaki season

== Review and events ==
Verdy Kawasaki won J.League NICOS series (second stage).

=== League results summary ===
Overall								Home						Away					
Pld	W	D	L	GF	GA	GD	Pts	W	D	L	GF	GA	GD	W	D	L	GF	GA	GD
44	31	0	13	91	47	+44	93	17	0	5	49	21	+28	14	0	8	42	26	+16

Source: J.LEAGUE OFFICIAL 1995 RECORD & DATA. ISBN 4-09-102317-7.

=== League results by round ===
J.League Suntory series (first stage)
Round	1	2	3	4	5	6	7	8	9	10	11	12	13	14	15	16	17	18	19	20	21	22
Ground	H	A	H	H	A	H	A	A	H	H	A	H	A	A	H	A	H	H	A	A	H	A
Result	W	L	W	L	L	W	W	L	W	L	W	W	L	W	W	W	L	W	W	L	W	W
Position	1	4	4	5	6	5	5	5	5	5	5	5	5	5	5	4	5	5	4	5	4	4

Source: J.LEAGUE OFFICIAL 1995 RECORD & DATA. ISBN 4-09-102317-7.
A = Away; H = Home; W = Win; D = Draw; L = Loss

J.League NICOS series (second stage)
Round	1	2	3	4	5	6	7	8	9	10	11	12	13	14	15	16	17	18	19	20	21	22
Ground	H	A	H	H	A	H	A	A	H	A	A	H	A	A	H	A	H	H	A	H	H	A
Result	L	W	W	W	W	W	L	W	W	W	W	W	L	W	W	W	L	W	W	W	W	L
Position	8	6	4	3	3	1	3	3	3	2	1	1	2	1	1	1	2	1	1	1	1	1

Source: J.LEAGUE OFFICIAL 1995 RECORD & DATA. ISBN 4-09-102317-7.
A = Away; H = Home; W = Win; D = Draw; L = Loss

== Competitions ==
Competitions	Position
J.League	Champions / 12 clubs
Emperor's Cup	2nd round
J.League Cup	Champions
Super Cup	Champions
Sanwa Bank Cup	Champions
1993–94 Asian Club Championship	3rd
1994–95 Asian Club Championship	Quarterfinals

== Domestic results ==
=== J.League ===
==== Suntory series ====
12 March 1994 1st-1	Verdy Kawasaki	5–1	Bellmare Hiratsuka	Tokyo National Stadium
19:04 JST (UTC+09)	Takeda 2'; Bismarck 19', 30'; Kitazawa 39'; Hashiratani 68'	J. League	Noguchi 50'	Attendance: 50,843; Referee: Zoran Petrović; Assistant referees: Noboru Ishiyama, Masayoshi Okada; Fourth official: Michio Nakahara; Man of the Match: Nobuhiro Takeda

16 March 1994 1st-2	Kashima Antlers	2–1 (V-goal) (a.e.t.)	Verdy Kawasaki	Kashima Soccer Stadium
19:04 JST (UTC+09)	Santos 22'; Alcindo 104'	J. League	Takeda 60'	Attendance: 14,181; Referee: Bengt Borjesson; Assistant referees: Hiroshi Fukuda, Kiyoshi Ōta; Fourth official: Ichirō Inukai

19 March 1994 1st-3	Verdy Kawasaki	3–2	Júbilo Iwata	Tokyo National Stadium
19:03 JST (UTC+09)	Miura 3'; Takeda 22', 64'	J. League	Nakayama 36'; M. Suzuki 54'	Attendance: 54,657; Referee: Masayoshi Okada; Assistant referees: Hitoshi Yamada, Tetsu Karakida; Fourth official: Mineo Takada; Man of the Match: Kazuyoshi Miura

23 March 1994 1st-4	Verdy Kawasaki	1–2	Yokohama Marinos	Tokyo National Stadium
19:05 JST (UTC+09)	Kitazawa 67'	J. League	Mizunuma 63'; Díaz 79' (pen.)	Attendance: 54,405; Referee: Zoran Petrović; Assistant referees: Noboru Ishiyama, Naotsugu Fuse; Fourth official: Tōru Kamikawa

26 March 1994 1st-5	Shimizu S-Pulse	2–1	Verdy Kawasaki	Kusanagi Athletic Stadium
19:04 JST (UTC+09)	Nagashima 15'; Toninho 41'	J. League	Bismarck 75'	Attendance: 18,239; Referee: Bengt Borjesson; Assistant referees: Yoshimi Ogawa, Naotsugu Fuse; Fourth official: Teruhito Kudō

2 April 1994 1st-6	Verdy Kawasaki	3–0	JEF United Ichihara	Hakatanomori Athletic Stadium
15:01 JST (UTC+09)	Takeda 22', 43'; Miura 42'	J. League		Attendance: 27,475; Referee: Hiroyuki Umemoto; Assistant referees: Kazuya Yanagisawa, Hideaki Harada; Fourth official: Hiroyuki Izumi; Man of the Match: Ruy Ramos

6 April 1994 1st-7	Sanfrecce Hiroshima	0–5	Verdy Kawasaki	Hiroshima Big Arch
19:03 JST (UTC+09)		J. League	Miura 22', 38' (pen.); Ramos 29'; Takeda 73'; Kitazawa 87'	Attendance: 27,052; Referee: Bengt Borjesson; Assistant referees: Fumikazu Shioyazono, Hiroshi Tanabe; Fourth official: Norio Kuriyama; Man of the Match: Kō Ishikawa

9 April 1994 1st-8	Nagoya Grampus Eight	1–0	Verdy Kawasaki	Nagoya Mizuho Football Stadium
15:01 JST (UTC+09)	Yonekura 61'	J. League		Attendance: 12,214; Referee: Kiichirō Tachi; Assistant referees: Yasuhiro Hemmi, Toyohide Kanda; Fourth official: Naoto Kuwahara

13 April 1994 1st-9	Verdy Kawasaki	2–0	Gamba Osaka	Kobe Universiade Memorial Stadium
19:03 JST (UTC+09)	Miura 67' (pen.); Takeda 83'	J. League		Attendance: 42,161; Referee: Zoran Petrović; Assistant referees: Kōetsu Kikuchi, Hiroyuki Umemoto; Fourth official: Kazunori Ōtoshi; Man of the Match: Capitão

16 April 1994 1st-10	Verdy Kawasaki	0–1 (V-goal) (a.e.t.)	Yokohama Flügels	Tokyo National Stadium
15:03 JST (UTC+09)		J. League	Amarilla 107'	Attendance: 51,770; Referee: Kōetsu Kikuchi; Assistant referees: Yū Nakamura, Hiroshi Fukuda; Fourth official: Kazuo Shirato

23 April 1994 1st-11	Urawa Red Diamonds	0–1 (V-goal) (a.e.t.)	Verdy Kawasaki	Tokyo National Stadium
19:03 JST (UTC+09)		J. League	Miura 98'	Attendance: 52,028; Referee: Kiyoshi Ōta; Assistant referees: Toshiyuki Mayuzumi, Tetsu Karakida; Fourth official: Izumi Okada; Man of the Match: Kazuyoshi Miura

27 April 1994 1st-12	Verdy Kawasaki	3–0	Kashima Antlers	Kawasaki Todoroki Stadium
19:03 JST (UTC+09)	Bismarck 44'; Takeda 50'; Abe 52'	J. League		Attendance: 10,575; Referee: Zoran Petrović; Assistant referees: Noboru Ishiyama, Naotsugu Fuse; Fourth official: Haruo Imai; Man of the Match: Bismarck

30 April 1994 1st-13	Júbilo Iwata	2–0	Verdy Kawasaki	Júbilo Iwata Stadium
19:03 JST (UTC+09)	M. Suzuki 51'; Schillaci 87' (pen.)	J. League		Attendance: 14,906; Referee: Shinichirō Obata; Assistant referees: Yasushi Tsuchimoto, Yasuhiro Matsuzaki; Fourth official: Takuya Okada

4 May 1994 1st-14	Yokohama Marinos	1–2	Verdy Kawasaki	Yokohama Mitsuzawa Football Stadium
19:04 JST (UTC+09)	Ihara 78'	J. League	Miura 86', 88'	Attendance: 13,343; Referee: Kōetsu Kikuchi; Assistant referees: Noboru Ishiyama, Masahiro Katagiri; Fourth official: Tōru Kamikawa; Man of the Match: Pereira

7 May 1994 1st-15	Verdy Kawasaki	2–0	Shimizu S-Pulse	Kawasaki Todoroki Stadium
19:03 JST (UTC+09)	Hasebe 10'; Miura 22'	J. League		Attendance: 10,595; Referee: Masayoshi Okada; Assistant referees: Toshiyuki Mayuzumi, Kimio Izaki; Fourth official: Jōji Kashihara; Man of the Match: Kazuyoshi Miura

14 May 1994 1st-16	JEF United Ichihara	0–1 (V-goal) (a.e.t.)	Verdy Kawasaki	Tokyo National Stadium
19:05 JST (UTC+09)		J. League	Miura 94'	Attendance: 52,228; Referee: Kiyoshi Ōta; Assistant referees: Takeshi Ōkura, Tetsu Karakida; Fourth official: Kaoru Nagase; Man of the Match: Shinkichi Kikuchi

18 May 1994 1st-17	Verdy Kawasaki	1–4	Sanfrecce Hiroshima	Kawasaki Todoroki Stadium
19:02 JST (UTC+09)	Miura 71' (pen.)	J. League	Hašek 27', 41', 74'; Moriyasu 50'	Attendance: 10,571; Referee: Zoran Petrović; Assistant referees: Keiichi Sunakawa, Tetsu Karakida; Fourth official: Masao Imamura

1 June 1994 1st-18	Verdy Kawasaki	2–1	Nagoya Grampus Eight	Kawasaki Todoroki Stadium
19:04 JST (UTC+09)	Hashiratani 55'; Takeda 69'	J. League	Moriyama 78'	Attendance: 10,591; Referee: Masayoshi Okada; Assistant referees: Noboru Ishiyama, Masahiro Katagiri; Fourth official: Tetsuo Yamaki; Man of the Match: Tetsuji Hashiratani

4 June 1994 1st-19	Gamba Osaka	1–3	Verdy Kawasaki	Expo '70 Commemorative Stadium
19:05 JST (UTC+09)	Yamaguchi 24'	J. League	Miura 11', 22'; Kitazawa 87'	Attendance: 21,829; Referee: Hiroyuki Umemoto; Assistant referees: Yoshikazu Hiroshima, Yasuhiro Hemmi; Fourth official: Tsuyoshi Miyake; Man of the Match: Tsuyoshi Kitazawa

8 June 1994 1st-20	Yokohama Flügels	1–1 (V-goal) (a.e.t.) (5–3 p)	Verdy Kawasaki	Tokyo National Stadium
19:02 JST (UTC+09)	Amarilla 35'	J. League	Nishizawa 74'	Attendance: 55,014; Referee: Hideo Kikuchi; Assistant referees: Hiroshi Fukuda, Masato Nogami
	Penalties
	(penalty scored) Edu; (penalty scored) Maeda; (penalty scored) Katsura; (penalty scored) Válber; (penalty scored) Iwai		(penalty missed) Hashiratani; (penalty scored) Miura; (penalty scored) Bismarck; (penalty scored) Kitazawa

11 June 1994 1st-21	Verdy Kawasaki	3–0	Urawa Red Diamonds	Kawasaki Todoroki Stadium
19:03 JST (UTC+09)	Miura 32'; Takeda 42', 54'	J. League		Attendance: 10,597; Referee: Fumikazu Shioyazono; Assistant referees: Hitoshi Yamada, Hiroshi Fukuda; Fourth official: T. Katō (加藤 恒夫); Man of the Match: Pereira

15 June 1994 1st-22	Bellmare Hiratsuka	0–3	Verdy Kawasaki	Hiratsuka Stadium
19:02 JST (UTC+09)		J. League	Takeda 31'; Miura 64', 69'	Attendance: 15,448; Referee: Masayoshi Okada; Assistant referees: Noboru Ishiyama, Takashi Kunori; Fourth official: Kōzō Shibata; Man of the Match: Bismarck

==== NICOS series ====
10 August 1994 2nd-1	Verdy Kawasaki	1–2	Bellmare Hiratsuka	Kawasaki Todoroki Stadium
19:01 JST (UTC+09)	Kitazawa 59'	J. League	Noguchi 11', 57'	Attendance: 10,630; Referee: Kiyoshi Ōta; Assistant referees: Noboru Ishiyama, Takeshi Ōkura; Fourth official: Michio Nakahara

13 August 1994 2nd-2	Kashima Antlers	2–2 (V-goal) (a.e.t.) (4–5 p)	Verdy Kawasaki	Kashima Soccer Stadium
19:04 JST (UTC+09)	Kurosaki 1'; Leonardo 37'	J. League	Hironaga 58'; Bentinho 63'	Attendance: 16,041; Referee: Hideo Kikuchi; Assistant referees: Kimio Izaki, Masato Nogami; Fourth official: Ichirō Inukai; Man of the Match: Shinkichi Kikuchi
	Penalties
	(penalty scored) Alcindo; (penalty scored) Leonardo; (penalty scored) Akita; (penalty missed) Yoshida; (penalty scored) Hasegawa; (penalty missed) Gaya		(penalty scored) Hashiratani; (penalty missed) Bismarck; (penalty scored) Ishikawa; (penalty scored) Kitazawa; (penalty scored) Bentinho; (penalty scored) Hironaga

17 August 1994 2nd-3	Verdy Kawasaki	4–1	Júbilo Iwata	Kawasaki Todoroki Stadium
19:03 JST (UTC+09)	Bentinho 15', 81', 86'; Bismarck 42' (pen.)	J. League	Matsubara 54'	Attendance: 10,629; Referee: Kenji Tanaka; Assistant referees: Takashi Kunori, Hiroshi Tanabe; Fourth official: Kanichi Takahashi; Man of the Match: Bentinho

20 August 1994 2nd-4	Verdy Kawasaki	1–0	Yokohama Marinos	Kawasaki Todoroki Stadium
19:03 JST (UTC+09)	Bentinho 15'	J. League		Attendance: 10,701; Referee: Kiyoshi Ōta; Assistant referees: Takeshi Ōkura, Tetsu Karakida; Fourth official: Haruo Imai; Man of the Match: Pereira

27 August 1994 2nd-5	Shimizu S-Pulse	1–2	Verdy Kawasaki	Kusanagi Athletic Stadium
19:05 JST (UTC+09)	Iwashita 89'	J. League	Bismarck 62'; Kitazawa 75'	Attendance: 19,034; Referee: Kenji Tanaka; Assistant referees: Yoshikazu Hiroshima, Sōichirō Kaneko; Fourth official: Masakazu Hōjō; Man of the Match: Tsuyoshi Kitazawa

31 August 1994 2nd-6	Verdy Kawasaki	3–1	JEF United Ichihara	Kawasaki Todoroki Stadium
19:02 JST (UTC+09)	Takeda 18', 85'; Bentinho 39'	J. League	Ordenewitz 43'	Attendance: 10,617; Referee: Yōtarō Moritsu; Assistant referees: Takashi Kunori, Masahiro Katagiri; Fourth official: Hideaki Ishii; Man of the Match: Ruy Ramos

3 September 1994 2nd-7	Sanfrecce Hiroshima	3–2	Verdy Kawasaki	Hiroshima Big Arch
19:05 JST (UTC+09)	Černý 7', 75'; Yanagimoto 52'	J. League	Bentinho 21', 54'	Attendance: 42,505; Referee: Hiroyuki Umemoto; Assistant referees: Morihisa Yamaguchi, Naoki Esumi; Fourth official: Mamoru Ueda

7 September 1994 2nd-8	Nagoya Grampus Eight	1–2	Verdy Kawasaki	Nagoya Mizuho Athletics Stadium
19:05 JST (UTC+09)	Lineker 45'	J. League	Takeda 36'; Bismarck 63'	Attendance: 21,316; Referee: Kōetsu Kikuchi; Assistant referees: Masahiro Katagiri, Mitsuo Kadota; Fourth official: Toshiya Narita; Man of the Match: Bismarck

10 September 1994 2nd-9	Verdy Kawasaki	2–1	Gamba Osaka	Kawasaki Todoroki Stadium
15:02 JST (UTC+09)	Takeda 60', 77'	J. League	Flavio 79' (pen.)	Attendance: 10,641; Referee: Kiyoshi Ōta; Assistant referees: Mitsuru Satō, Takashi Kunori; Fourth official: Yoshiharu Nakamura; Man of the Match: Nobuhiro Takeda

14 September 1994 2nd-10	Yokohama Flügels	2–3	Verdy Kawasaki	Yokohama Mitsuzawa Football Stadium
19:04 JST (UTC+09)	Maeda 8'; Katsura 85'	J. League	Bentinho 17', 68'; Takeda 45'	Attendance: 14,085; Referee: Fumikazu Shioyazono; Assistant referees: Hitoshi Yamada, Masato Nogami; Fourth official: Kazuhiko Uchida; Man of the Match: Nobuhiro Takeda

17 September 1994 2nd-11	Urawa Red Diamonds	1–3	Verdy Kawasaki	Tokyo National Stadium
18:32 JST (UTC+09)	Y. Satō 71'	J. League	Pereira 44', 47'; Bentinho 63'	Attendance: 55,125; Referee: Masayoshi Okada; Assistant referees: Hitoshi Yamada, Takeshi Ōkura; Fourth official: Keiji Kamiara; Man of the Match: Pereira

21 September 1994 2nd-12	Verdy Kawasaki	2–1	Kashima Antlers	Kawasaki Todoroki Stadium
19:04 JST (UTC+09)	Bismarck 52' (pen.), 72'	J. League	Hasegawa 76'	Attendance: 10,640; Referee: Naotsugu Fuse; Assistant referees: Noboru Ishiyama, Toshiyuki Mayuzumi; Fourth official: Takeshi Ōgiya; Man of the Match: Bismarck

19 October 1994 2nd-13	Júbilo Iwata	2–1 (V-goal) (a.e.t.)	Verdy Kawasaki	Júbilo Iwata Stadium
19:04 JST (UTC+09)	Schillaci 36'; Yonezawa 100'	J. League	Bentinho 44'	Attendance: 15,078; Referee: Tatsumi Ōno; Assistant referees: Yasushi Tsuchimoto, Takashi Kunori; Fourth official: Tōru Nagata

22 October 1994 2nd-14	Yokohama Marinos	0–2	Verdy Kawasaki	Tokyo National Stadium
15:03 JST (UTC+09)		J. League	Bismarck 35', 88'	Attendance: 49,243; Referee: Alberto Tejada; Assistant referees: Yū Nakamura, Tetsu Karakida; Fourth official: Kazuo Shirato; Man of the Match: Bismarck

26 October 1994 2nd-15	Verdy Kawasaki	5–1	Shimizu S-Pulse	Tokyo National Stadium
19:04 JST (UTC+09)	Ishikawa 7'; Ramos 16'; Bentinho 34'; Kitazawa 51', 74'	J. League	Djalminha 4'	Attendance: 51,166; Referee: Zoran Petrović; Assistant referees: Takeshi Ōkura, Yasuhiro Matsuzaki; Fourth official: Tōru Kamikawa; Man of the Match: Ruy Ramos

29 October 1994 2nd-16	JEF United Ichihara	1–3	Verdy Kawasaki	Ichihara Stadium
19:05 JST (UTC+09)	Maslovar 6'	J. League	Takeda 40'; Bismarck 75'; Kitazawa 84'	Attendance: 14,975; Referee: Naotsugu Fuse; Assistant referees: Mitsuru Satō, Masahiro Katagiri; Fourth official: Misao Kataoka; Man of the Match: Nobuhiro Takeda

2 November 1994 2nd-17	Verdy Kawasaki	0–1	Sanfrecce Hiroshima	Kawasaki Todoroki Stadium
19:03 JST (UTC+09)		J. League	Hašek 16'	Attendance: 15,554; Referee: Alberto Tejada; Assistant referees: Yū Nakamura, Yoshikazu Hiroshima; Fourth official: Yoshiharu Nakamura

5 November 1994 2nd-18	Verdy Kawasaki	2–1 (V-goal) (a.e.t.)	Nagoya Grampus Eight	Kawasaki Todoroki Stadium
19:04 JST (UTC+09)	Ramos 77'; Fujiyoshi 93'	J. League	Moriyama 67'	Attendance: 15,547; Referee: Zoran Petrović; Assistant referees: Hiroshi Fukuda, Masahiro Katagiri; Fourth official: Hideaki Ishii; Man of the Match: Ruy Ramos

9 November 1994 2nd-19	Gamba Osaka	1–3	Verdy Kawasaki	Expo '70 Commemorative Stadium
19:06 JST (UTC+09)	Yamaguchi 39'	J. League	Bismarck 67' (pen.); Ishizuka 80'; Takeda 88'	Attendance: 19,778; Referee: Alberto Tejada; Assistant referees: Noboru Ishiyama, Yoshikazu Hiroshima; Fourth official: Akira Okada; Man of the Match: Keiji Ishizuka

12 November 1994 2nd-20	Verdy Kawasaki	2–0	Yokohama Flügels	Kawasaki Todoroki Stadium
19:03 JST (UTC+09)	Bismarck 20'; Fujiyoshi 74'	J. League		Attendance: 15,533; Referee: Yoshimi Ogawa; Assistant referees: Yū Nakamura, Kimio Izaki; Fourth official: Kōzō Shibata; Man of the Match: Shinkichi Kikuchi

16 November 1994 2nd-21	Verdy Kawasaki	2–1	Urawa Red Diamonds	Tokyo National Stadium
19:03 JST (UTC+09)	Takeda 30', 42'	J. League	Rummenigge 87'	Attendance: 52,480; Referee: Naotsugu Fuse; Assistant referees: Mitsuru Satō, Toshiyuki Mayuzumi; Fourth official: Kazuhiko Uchida; Man of the Match: Nobuhiro Takeda

19 November 1994 2nd-22	Bellmare Hiratsuka	2–1	Verdy Kawasaki	Hiratsuka Stadium
15:01 JST (UTC+09)	Edson 21'; Betinho 65'	J. League	Fujiyoshi 25'	Attendance: 15,621; Referee: Hiroyuki Umemoto; Assistant referees: Noboru Ishiyama, Kimio Izaki; Fourth official: Haruo Suzuki

==== J.League Championship ====
26 November 1994 1	Sanfrecce Hiroshima	0–1	Verdy Kawasaki	Hiroshima Big Arch
14:38 JST (UTC+09)		J. League	Kitazawa 35'	Attendance: 42,316; Referee: Alberto Tejada; Assistant referees: Kazuya Yanagisawa, Yasuhiro Matsuzaki; Fourth official: Yōtarō Moritsu

2 December 1994 2	Verdy Kawasaki	1–0 (2–0 agg.)	Sanfrecce Hiroshima	Tokyo National Stadium
19:02 JST (UTC+09)	Ramos 80'	J. League		Attendance: 50,512; Referee: Zoran Petrović; Assistant referees: Noboru Ishiyama, Yoshikazu Hiroshima; Fourth official: Kiyoshi Ōta

=== Emperor's Cup ===
4 December 1994 1st Round	Fujieda Blux	1–4	Verdy Kawasaki	Júbilo Iwata Stadium
: JST (UTC+09)	Furube (?)		Ishizuka (?); Tsunami (?); Kitazawa (?); Bismarck (?)

11 December 1994 2nd Round	Cerezo Osaka	1–0	Verdy Kawasaki	Kagoshima Kamoike Stadium
: JST (UTC+09)	Morishima (?)

=== J.League Cup ===
1st Round	bye

30 July 1994 Quarterfinals	Verdy Kawasaki	1–0 (V-goal) (a.e.t.)	JEF United Ichihara	Kawasaki Todoroki Stadium
19:01 JST (UTC+09)	Bismarck 95'	J. League		Attendance: 10,612; Referee: Kōetsu Kikuchi; Assistant referees: Noboru Ishiyama, Kimio Izaki; Fourth official: Mineo Takada

3 August 1994 Semifinals	Verdy Kawasaki	7–1	Gamba Osaka	Nagoya Mizuho Athletics Stadium
19:02 JST (UTC+09)	Bismarck 12', 31' (pen.), 35', 52'; Bentinho 16'; Kitazawa 71'; Takeda 89'	J. League	Flavio 75'	Attendance: 18,792; Referee: Masayoshi Okada; Assistant referees: Sōichirō Kaneko, Toshiyuki Mayuzumi; Fourth official: Yasushi Tsuchimoto

6 August 1994 Final	Verdy Kawasaki	2–0	Júbilo Iwata	Kobe Universiade Memorial Stadium
19:04 JST (UTC+09)	Bentinho 34'; Bismarck 42'	J. League		Attendance: 37,475; Referee: Yoshimi Ogawa; Assistant referees: Hiroshi Fukuda, Kazuya Yanagisawa; Fourth official: Yoshitsugu Katayama

=== Super Cup ===
5 March 1994	Yokohama Flügels	1–2	Verdy Kawasaki	Tokyo National Stadium
14:06 JST (UTC+09)	Válber 63'	J. League	Takeda 44'; Bismarck 77'	Attendance: 51,154; Referee: Shinichirō Obata; Assistant referees: Tatsumi Ōno, Hiroshi Fukuda; Fourth official: Keiichi Sunakawa

=== Sanwa Bank Cup ===
26 February 1994	Verdy Kawasaki	2–2 (4–2 p)	(Argentina) Gimnasia	Tokyo National Stadium
: JST (UTC+09)	Miura (?); Bismarck (?)		Guerra (?); Guillermo B. Schelotto (?)	Attendance: 45,617

== International results ==
=== 1993–94 Asian Club Championship ===
1 February 1994 Quarterfinals-1	(Japan) Verdy Kawasaki	1–0	(Oman) Omani	Bangkok, Thailand
	Hasebe (?)

3 February 1994 Quarterfinals-2	(Japan) Verdy Kawasaki	2–0	(Lebanon) Al Ansar	Bangkok, Thailand
	Hironaga (?); Hasebe (?)

Quarterfinals-3	bye

5 February 1994 Semifinals	(Japan) Verdy Kawasaki	1–3 (a.e.t.)	(Thailand) Thai Farmers Bank	Bangkok, Thailand
	T. Kikuchi (?)		? (?) ? (?) ? (?)

7 February 1994 3rd place	(Japan) Verdy Kawasaki	4–1	(China) Liaoning	Bangkok, Thailand
	Ono (?); T. Kikuchi (?); Hironaga (?)		? (?)

=== 1994–95 Asian Club Championship ===
1st Round	bye

24 September 1994 2nd Round-1	(Hong Kong) Eastern	1–2	(Japan) Verdy Kawasaki	Hong Kong
	? (?)		Bentinho (?); Bismarck (?)

17 October 1994 2nd Round-2	(Japan) Verdy Kawasaki	4–3 (6–4 agg.)	(Hong Kong) Eastern	Tokyo, Japan
	Bismarck (?)		チェウン (?) チウ (?) マック (?)	Stadium: Tokyo National Stadium

20 November 1994 Quarterfinals-1	(Japan) Verdy Kawasaki	1–3	(South Korea) Ilhwa	Changwon, Korea Rep.
	Abe (?)		? (?) ? (?) ? (?)

November 1994 Quarterfinals-2	(Japan) Verdy Kawasaki	0–0	(Thailand) Thai Farmers Bank	Changwon, Korea Rep.

24 November 1994 Quarterfinals-3	(Japan) Verdy Kawasaki	0–0	(China) Liaoning	Changwon, Korea Rep.

== Player statistics ==
No.	Pos	Nat	Player	Total		J.League		J.League Championship		Emperor's Cup		J.League Cup		Super Cup		Sanwa Bank Cup	
No.	Pos	Nat	Player	Apps	Goals	Apps	Goals	Apps	Goals	Apps	Goals	Apps	Goals	Apps	Goals	Apps	Goals
	GK	(Japan) JPN	Takayuki Fujikawa	9	0	6	0	0	0	0	0	1	0	1	0	1	0
	GK	(Japan) JPN	Yūji Keigoshi	0	0	0	0	0	0	0	0	0	0	0	0	0	0
	GK	(Japan) JPN	Shinkichi Kikuchi	46	0	39	0	2	0	2	0	2	0	0	0	1	0
	GK	(Japan) JPN	Hiroki Koike	0	0	0	0	0	0	0	0	0	0	0	0	0	0
	GK	(Japan) JPN	Manabu Konno	0	0	0	0	0	0	0	0	0	0	0	0	0	0
	DF	(Brazil) BRA	Pereira	51	2	43	2	2	0	2	0	3	0	1	0	0	0
	DF	(Japan) JPN	Satoshi Tsunami	10	1	8	0	0	0	2	1	0	0	0	0	0	0
	DF	(Japan) JPN	Kō Ishikawa	49	1	40	1	2	0	2	0	3	0	1	0	1	0
	DF	(Japan) JPN	Kenichirō Tokura	14	0	11	0	0	0	0	0	3	0	0	0	0	0
	DF	(Japan) JPN	Tadashi Nakamura	25	0	21	0	2	0	1	0	1	0	0	0	0	0
	DF	(Japan) JPN	Mitsuhiro Kawamoto	14	0	13	0	0	0	0	0	0	0	0	0	1	0
	DF	(Japan) JPN	Kōichi Togashi	0	0	0	0	0	0	0	0	0	0	0	0	0	0
	DF	(Japan) JPN	Keizō Adachi	0	0	0	0	0	0	0	0	0	0	0	0	0	0
	DF	(Japan) JPN	Tatsuya Murata	0	0	0	0	0	0	0	0	0	0	0	0	0	0
	DF	(Japan) JPN	Toshimi Kikuchi	0	0	0	0	0	0	0	0	0	0	0	0	0	0
	DF	(Japan) JPN	Shun Suzuki	0	0	0	0	0	0	0	0	0	0	0	0	0	0
	DF	(Japan) JPN	Junji Nishizawa	8	1	7	1	0	0	0	0	0	0	0	0	1	0
	DF	(Japan) JPN	Yūji Hironaga	23	1	18	1	0	0	2	0	3	0	0	0	0	0
	MF	(Japan) JPN	Ruy Ramos	33	4	26	3	2	1	0	0	3	0	1	0	1	0
	MF	(Brazil) BRA	Paulo	4	0	3	0	0	0	0	0	0	0	1	0	0	0
	MF	(Japan) JPN	Tetsuya Totsuka	7	0	7	0	0	0	0	0	0	0	0	0	0	0
	MF	(Japan) JPN	Tetsuji Hashiratani	49	2	40	2	2	0	2	0	3	0	1	0	1	0
	MF	(Japan) JPN	Yoshiyuki Katō	8	0	6	0	0	0	0	0	0	0	1	0	1	0
	MF	(Japan) JPN	Masahiro Sukigara	0	0	0	0	0	0	0	0	0	0	0	0	0	0
	MF	(Japan) JPN	Tsuyoshi Kitazawa	49	12	40	9	2	1	2	1	3	1	1	0	1	0
	MF	(Brazil) BRA	Bismarck	51	23	42	14	2	0	2	1	3	6	1	1	1	1
	MF	(Japan) JPN	Hideki Nagai	20	0	15	0	0	0	1	0	2	0	1	0	1	0
	MF	(Japan) JPN	Shigetoshi Hasebe	22	1	20	1	0	0	1	0	1	0	0	0	0	0
	MF	(Japan) JPN	Junichi Watanabe	1	0	1	0	0	0	0	0	0	0	0	0	0	0
	MF	(Japan) JPN	Takayuki Yamaguchi	0	0	0	0	0	0	0	0	0	0	0	0	0	0
	MF	(Japan) JPN	Shingi Ono	0	0	0	0	0	0	0	0	0	0	0	0	0	0
	MF	(Japan) JPN	Keiji Ishizuka	11	2	7	1	2	0	2	1	0	0	0	0	0	0
	FW	(Japan) JPN	Kazuo Ozaki	0	0	0	0	0	0	0	0	0	0	0	0	0	0
	FW	(Japan) JPN	Kazuyoshi Miura	24	17	22	16	0	0	0	0	0	0	1	0	1	1
	FW	(Japan) JPN	Nobuhiro Takeda	47	25	40	23	2	0	0	0	3	1	1	1	1	0
	FW	(Japan) JPN	Shinji Fujiyoshi	12	3	8	3	0	0	2	0	0	0	1	0	1	0
	FW	(Japan) JPN	Tomohiro Hasumi	0	0	0	0	0	0	0	0	0	0	0	0	0	0
	FW	(Japan) JPN	Yoshinori Abe	11	1	11	1	0	0	0	0	0	0	0	0	0	0
	FW	(Japan) JPN	Takashi Ujiie	0	0	0	0	0	0	0	0	0	0	0	0	0	0
		(Japan) JPN	Naohito Tomaru	0	0	0	0	0	0	0	0	0	0	0	0	0	0
		(Japan) JPN	Tsuyoshi Yamamoto	0	0	0	0	0	0	0	0	0	0	0	0	0	0
	MF	(Brazil) BRA	Capitão †	21	0	18	0	2	0	1	0	0	0	0	0	0	0
	FW	(Brazil) BRA	Bentinho †	20	15	16	13	0	0	1	0	3	2	0	0	0	0
	DF	(Japan) JPN	Hisashi Katō †	9	0	7	0	2	0	0	0	0	0	0	0	0	0
		(Japan) JPN	Tomo Sugawara †	0	0	0	0	0	0	0	0	0	0	0	0	0	0
		(Japan) JPN	Mitsunori Yabuta †	0	0	0	0	0	0	0	0	0	0	0	0	0	0
		(Japan) JPN	Kei Hoshikawa †	0	0	0	0	0	0	0	0	0	0	0	0	0	0

- † player(s) joined the team after the opening of this season.

== Transfers ==
In:

No.	Pos.	Nation	Player
—	DF	JPN	Kenichirō Tokura (from Aoyama Gakuin University)
—	DF	JPN	Yūji Hironaga (from Toin Gakuen High School)
—	MF	JPN	Shigetoshi Hasebe (from Chuo University)
—	FW	JPN	Takashi Ujiie (from Yomiuri Junior)

Out:

No.	Pos.	Nation	Player
—	DF	JPN	Hirokazu Sasaki (to Cerezo Osaka)
—	MF	JPN	Ryūichi Yoneyama
—	MF	JPN	Shirō Kikuhara (loan to Urawa Red Diamonds)
—	MF	BRA	Amoroso
—	FW	JPN	Nobuyuki Hosaka (to Urawa Red Diamonds)
—	FW	JPN	Haruo Hiroyama
—	FW	BRA	Paulinho
—	FW	JPN	Kōji Seki (to Tokyo Gas)
—	FW		Kim San-Jun

== Transfers during the season ==
=== In ===
- (Brazil) Capitão (from Associação Portuguesa on April)
- (Brazil) Bentinho (on July)
- (Japan) Hisashi Katō (from Shimizu S-Pulse)
- (Japan) Tetsuya Totsuka (loan return from Kashiwa Reysol on November)
- (Japan) Tomo Sugawara (from Yomiuri S.C. youth)
- (Japan) Mitsunori Yabuta (from Yomiuri S.C. youth)
- (Japan) Kei Hoshikawa (from Yomiuri S.C. youth)

=== Out ===
- (Japan) Naohito Tomaru
- (Japan) Tsuyoshi Yamamoto
- (Japan) Kazuo Ozaki (retired)
- (Japan) Masahiro Sukigara (to Urawa Red Diamonds on March)
- (Japan) Tetsuya Totsuka (loan to Kashiwa Reysol on June)
- (Japan) Kazuyoshi Miura (loan to Genoa on July)
- (Brazil) Paulo (on July)
- (Brazil) Bentinho (on December)
- (Japan) ||Takayuki Yamaguchi (to Coritiba)

== Awards ==
- J.League Most Valuable Player: (Brazil) Pereira
- J.League Best XI: (Japan) Shinkichi Kikuchi, (Brazil) Pereira, (Japan) Tsuyoshi Kitazawa, (Japan) Tetsuji Hashiratani, (Brazil) Bismarck, (Japan) Ruy Ramos, (Japan) Nobuhiro Takeda
- J.League Cup Most Valuable Player: (Brazil) Bismarck

== Other pages ==
- (in Japanese) J. League official site
- (in Japanese) Tokyo Verdy official site
