= Tatsuya Murata =

Japanese footballer and manager

Tatsuya Murata 村田 達哉
Personal information
- Full name: Tatsuya Murata
- Date of birth: August 8, 1972 (age 54)
- Place of birth: Tokyo, Japan
- Height: 1.71 m (5 ft 7 1/2 in)
- Position: Defender

Team information
- Current team: Briobecca Urayasu (assistant manager)

Youth career
- 1988–1990: Yomiuri

Senior career*
Years	Team	Apps	(Gls)
1991–1994	Verdy Kawasaki	0	(0)
1995–2000	Consadole Sapporo	126	(5)
2001–2004	Vegalta Sendai	54	(0)
2003	→Omiya Ardija (loan)	22	(0)
Total		202	(5)

Managerial career
- 2018: Cobaltore Onagawa
Medal record
Verdy Kawasaki
Winner	Japan Soccer League	1991/92
Winner	J1 League	1993
Winner	J1 League	1994
Winner	JSL Cup	1991
Winner	J.League Cup	1992
Winner	J.League Cup	1993
Winner	J.League Cup	1994
Runner-up	Emperor's Cup	1991
Runner-up	Emperor's Cup	1992
- * Club domestic league appearances and goals

Tatsuya Murata (村田 達哉, Murata Tatsuya; born August 8, 1972) is a former Japanese football player and manager He is the currently assistant manager Japan Football League club Briobecca Urayasu.

== Playing career ==
Murata was born in Tokyo on August 8, 1972. He joined Yomiuri (later Verdy Kawasaki) from youth team in 1990. However he could not play at all in the match in top team. In 1995 he moved to Toshiba (later Consadole Sapporo). He became a regular player as left side-back. The club won the champions in 1997 and was promoted to J1 League. However the club was relegated to J2 League in a year. In 2000, his opportunity to play decreased and he moved to J2 club Vegalta Sendai in 2001. He played as regular player and the club was promoted to J1 end of 2001 season. In 2003, he lost his opportunity to play and moved to Omiya Ardija in June. He returned to Vegalta in 2004 and retired at the end of the 2004 season.

== Coaching career ==
After retirement, Murata moved to Italy and became a coach for ChievoVerona in 2005. He mainly coached youth team until 2007. In 2008, he returned to Japan and joined his old club Consadole Sapporo. He mainly served as scout and coach for top team. In 2014, he moved to L.League club Nippon TV Beleza and became a coach. In September 2014, he moved to Tokyo Verdy and served a coach until 2016. In 2017, he returned to Nippon TV Beleza. In 2018, he moved to Japan Football League club Cobaltore Onagawa and became a manager.

== Career statistics ==
Appearances and goals by club, season and competition
Club	Season	League			Emperor's Cup		J.League Cup		Total	
Club	Season	Division	Apps	Goals	Apps	Goals	Apps	Goals	Apps	Goals
Yomiuri	1990–91	JSL Division 1	0	0	0	0	0	0	0	0
Yomiuri	1991–92	JSL Division 1	0	0	0	0	0	0	0	0
Verdy Kawasaki	1992	J1 League	—				0	0	0	0
Verdy Kawasaki	1993	J1 League	0	0	0	0	0	0	0	0
Verdy Kawasaki	1994	J1 League	0	0	0	0	0	0	0	0
Toshiba	1995	Football League	17	0	1	0	—		18	0
Consadole Sapporo	1996	Football League	27	1	3	0	—		30	1
Consadole Sapporo	1997	Football League	27	3	3	0	7	0	37	3
Consadole Sapporo	1998	J1 League	18	1	3	0	4	0	25	1
Consadole Sapporo	1999	J2 League	30	0	3	0	2	0	35	0
Consadole Sapporo	2000	J2 League	7	0	2	0	1	0	10	0
Vegalta Sendai	2001	J2 League	27	0	2	1	2	0	31	1
Vegalta Sendai	2002	J1 League	25	0	0	0	4	0	29	0
Vegalta Sendai	2003	J1 League	0	0	0	0	0	0	0	0
Omiya Ardija	2003	J2 League	22	0	1	0	—		23	0
Vegalta Sendai	2004	J2 League	2	0	0	0	—		2	0
Career total			202	5	18	1	20	0	240	6
