= Takayuki Fujikawa =

Japanese footballer (1962–2018)

Takayuki Fujikawa 藤川 孝幸
Personal information
- Full name: Takayuki Fujikawa
- Date of birth: October 10, 1962
- Place of birth: Kawasaki, Kanagawa, Japan
- Date of death: November 15, 2018 (aged 56)
- Height: 1.83 m (6 ft 0 in)
- Position: Goalkeeper

Youth career
- 1978–1980: Yomiuri

Senior career*
Years	Team	Apps	(Gls)
1981–1995	Verdy Kawasaki	82	(0)
Total		82	(0)
Medal record
Verdy Kawasaki
Winner	Japan Soccer League	1983
Winner	Japan Soccer League	1984
Winner	Japan Soccer League	1986/87
Winner	Japan Soccer League	1990/91
Winner	Japan Soccer League	1991/92
Runner-up	Japan Soccer League	1981
Runner-up	Japan Soccer League	1989/90
Winner	J1 League	1993
Winner	J1 League	1994
Runner-up	J1 League	1995
Winner	JSL Cup	1985
Winner	JSL Cup	1991
Winner	J.League Cup	1992
Winner	J.League Cup	1993
Winner	J.League Cup	1994
Winner	Emperor's Cup	1984
Winner	Emperor's Cup	1986
Winner	Emperor's Cup	1987
Runner-up	Emperor's Cup	1981
Runner-up	Emperor's Cup	1991
Runner-up	Emperor's Cup	1992
- * Club domestic league appearances and goals

Takayuki Fujikawa (藤川 孝幸, Fujikawa Takayuki; October 10, 1962 – November 15, 2018) was a Japanese football player.

== Playing career ==
Fujikawa was born in Kawasaki on October 10, 1962. He joined Japan Soccer League club Yomiuri (later Verdy Kawasaki) from youth team in 1981. He played many matches as goalkeeper in 1985–86 season. After that, he battles with Shinkichi Kikuchi for the position for a long time. In 1992, Japan Soccer League was folded and founded new league J1 League. However, his opportunity to play decreased behind Kikuchi. He retired at the end of the 1995 season.

== Coaching career ==
After retirement, Fujikawa started coaching career at Verdy Kawasaki in 1996. He served goalkeeper coach until 2000. From 2001, he coached at many J.League clubs, Vissel Kobe (2001–2004), Vegalta Sendai (2005), Cerezo Osaka (2007) and Avispa Fukuoka (2008–2009). He also managed Konan University (2006) and International Budo University (2010). In May 2017, he became a chairman for Tokachi FC (later Hokkaido Tokachi Sky Earth).

On November 15, 2018, Fujikawa died of stomach cancer at the age of 56.

== Club statistics ==
Club performance			League		Cup		League Cup		Total	
Season	Club	League	Apps	Goals	Apps	Goals	Apps	Goals	Apps	Goals
Japan			League		Emperor's Cup		J.League Cup		Total	
1981	Yomiuri	JSL Division 1	0	0	0	0	0	0	0	0
1982	Yomiuri	JSL Division 1	0	0	0	0	0	0	0	0
1983	Yomiuri	JSL Division 1	0	0	1	0	0	0	1	0
1984	Yomiuri	JSL Division 1	0	0	0	0	0	0	0	0
1985/86	Yomiuri	JSL Division 1	12	0	2	0	4	0	18	0
1986/87	Yomiuri	JSL Division 1	0	0	0	0	1	0	1	0
1987/88	Yomiuri	JSL Division 1	6	0	1	0	0	0	7	0
1988/89	Yomiuri	JSL Division 1	9	0	0	0	0	0	9	0
1989/90	Yomiuri	JSL Division 1	11	0	0	0	0	0	11	0
1990/91	Yomiuri	JSL Division 1	2	0	0	0	0	0	2	0
1991/92	Yomiuri	JSL Division 1	16	0	5	0	0	0	21	0
1992	Verdy Kawasaki	J1 League	-		0	0	2	0	2	0
1993	Verdy Kawasaki	J1 League	9	0	0	0	0	0	9	0
1994	Verdy Kawasaki	J1 League	6	0	0	0	1	0	7	0
1995	Verdy Kawasaki	J1 League	11	0	0	0	-		11	0
Total			82	0	9	0	8	0	99	0
