= Tomohiro Hasumi =

Japanese footballer

Tomohiro Hasumi 蓮見 知弘
Personal information
- Full name: Tomohiro Hasumi
- Date of birth: June 6, 1972 (age 54)
- Place of birth: Nishitokyo, Tokyo, Japan
- Height: 1.71 m (5 ft 7 1/2 in)
- Position: Midfielder

Youth career
- 1988–1990: Yomiuri

Senior career*
Years	Team	Apps	(Gls)
1991–1995	Verdy Kawasaki	0	(0)
1996	Fujitsu	26	(2)
1997–1998	Tokyo Gas	52	(7)
1999–2001	Vegalta Sendai	80	(11)
Total		158	(20)
Medal record
Verdy Kawasaki
Winner	Japan Soccer League	1991/92
Winner	J1 League	1993
Winner	J1 League	1994
Runner-up	J1 League	1995
Winner	JSL Cup	1991
Winner	J.League Cup	1992
Winner	J.League Cup	1993
Winner	J.League Cup	1994
Runner-up	Emperor's Cup	1991
Runner-up	Emperor's Cup	1992
- * Club domestic league appearances and goals

Tomohiro Hasumi (蓮見 知弘, Hasumi Tomohiro; born June 6, 1972) is a former Japanese football player.

== Playing career ==
Hasumi was born in Nishitokyo on June 6, 1972. He joined Yomiuri (later Verdy Kawasaki) from youth team in 1991. However he could not play at all in the match in top team. In 1996, he moved to Japan Football League club Fujitsu and played many matches. In 1997, he moved to Tokyo Gas. He played as regular player and the club won the champions in 1998 season. In 1999, he moved to J2 League club Vegalta Sendai. Although he could not play many matches in first season, he became a regular player from 2000 season. The club won the 2nd place in 2001 and was promoted to J1 League. However he retired end of 2001 season without playing at J1 League.

== Career statistics ==
Appearances and goals by club, season and competition
Club	Season	League			Emperor's Cup		J.League Cup		Total	
Club	Season	Division	Apps	Goals	Apps	Goals	Apps	Goals	Apps	Goals
Yomiuri	1991–92	JSL Division 1	0	0	0	0	0	0	0	0
Verdy Kawasaki	1992	J1 League	—		0	0	0	0	0	0
Verdy Kawasaki	1993	J1 League	0	0	0	0	0	0	0	0
Verdy Kawasaki	1994	J1 League	0	0	0	0	0	0	0	0
Verdy Kawasaki	1995	J1 League	0	0	0	0	—		0	0
Fujitsu	1996	Football League	26	2	4	0	—		30	2
Tokyo Gas	1997	Football League	27	6	2	0	—		29	6
Tokyo Gas	1998	Football League	25	1	3	1	—		28	2
Vegalta Sendai	1999	J2 League	11	0	0	0	1	0	12	0
Vegalta Sendai	2000	J2 League	38	9	1	0	2	0	41	9
Vegalta Sendai	2001	J2 League	31	2	0	0	2	1	33	3
Career total			158	20	10	1	5	1	173	22
