= Hisashi Kato =

Japanese footballer and manager

Hisashi Kato 加藤 久
Personal information
- Full name: Hisashi Kato
- Date of birth: April 24, 1956 (age 70)
- Place of birth: Rifu, Miyagi, Japan
- Height: 1.74 m (5 ft 9 in)
- Position: Defender

Youth career
- 1972–1974: Sendai Daini High School

College career
Years	Team	Apps	(Gls)
1975–1978	Waseda University		

Senior career*
Years	Team	Apps	(Gls)
1980–1993	Verdy Kawasaki	216	(11)
1993–1994	Shimizu S-Pulse	20	(0)
1994	Verdy Kawasaki	7	(0)
Total		243	(11)

International career
1978–1987	Japan	61	(6)

Managerial career
- 1997: Verdy Kawasaki
- 2000: Shonan Bellmare
- 2004–2007: Kyoto Sanga FC
Medal record
Verdy Kawasaki
Winner	Japan Soccer League	1983
Winner	Japan Soccer League	1984
Winner	Japan Soccer League	1986/87
Winner	Japan Soccer League	1990/91
Winner	Japan Soccer League	1991/92
Runner-up	Japan Soccer League	1981
Runner-up	Japan Soccer League	1989/90
Winner	J1 League	1993
Winner	J1 League	1994
Winner	JSL Cup	1985
Winner	JSL Cup	1991
Winner	J.League Cup	1992
Winner	J.League Cup	1993
Winner	J.League Cup	1994
Winner	Emperor's Cup	1984
Winner	Emperor's Cup	1986
Winner	Emperor's Cup	1987
Runner-up	Emperor's Cup	1981
Runner-up	Emperor's Cup	1991
Runner-up	Emperor's Cup	1992
Shimizu S-Pulse
Runner-up	J.League Cup	1993
- * Club domestic league appearances and goals

Hisashi Kato (加藤 久, Kato Hisashi; born April 24, 1956) is a former Japanese football player and manager. He played for the Japanese national team.

== Club career ==
Kato was born in Rifu, Miyagi on April 24, 1956. After graduating from Waseda University, after a year's blank, he joined Yomiuri (later Verdy Kawasaki) in 1980. The club won the champions in Japan Soccer League 5 times, JSL Cup 2 times and Emperor's Cup 3 times. This was golden era in club history. In 1992, Japan Soccer League was folded and founded new league J1 League. The club won 1992 J.League Cup. J1 League first season in 1993, although he played in opening match, he lost opportunity to play after that. So, he moved to Shimizu S-Pulse in July. In July 1994, he returned to Verdy Kawasaki. The club won J1 League and retired end of 1994 season. He was 38 years old. He played 243 games and scored 11 goals in the league. He was selected Best Eleven 9 times.

== National team career ==
On November 19, 1978, when Kato was a Waseda University student, he debuted for Japan national team against Soviet Union. He played at 1978 and 1982 Asian Games. From 1984, he served as captain and played at 1984 Summer Olympics qualification, 1986 World Cup qualification, 1986 Asian Games and 1988 Summer Olympics qualification. At 1988 Olympics qualification in 1987, Japan failed to qualify for 1988 Summer Olympics and he retired from national team. He played 61 games and scored 6 goals for Japan until 1987.

== Coaching career ==
After retirement, Kato became a manager for Verdy Kawasaki in 1997. But he resigned in July. In 2000, he signed with J2 League club Shonan Bellmare. However the club finished 8th place, he was sacked end of 2000 season. In 2007, he signed with J2 club Kyoto Sanga FC and became a general manager. However he sacked manager Naohiko Minobe and Kato became new manager in October. He led the club to won 3rd place in 2007 and promoted to J1 League. In July 2010, he was sacked.

In 2018, Kato was selected Japan Football Hall of Fame.

== Club statistics ==
Club performance			League		Cup		League Cup		Total	
Season	Club	League	Apps	Goals	Apps	Goals	Apps	Goals	Apps	Goals
Japan			League		Emperor's Cup		J.League Cup		Total	
1980	Yomiuri	JSL Division 1	14	0	3	1	2	0	19	1
1981	Yomiuri	JSL Division 1	18	3	5	1	1	0	24	4
1982	Yomiuri	JSL Division 1	18	0	3	0	0	0	21	0
1983	Yomiuri	JSL Division 1	18	0	3	0	3	1	24	1
1984	Yomiuri	JSL Division 1	16	0	5	1	0	0	21	1
1985/86	Yomiuri	JSL Division 1	16	2	2	0	4	1	22	3
1986/87	Yomiuri	JSL Division 1	22	1	5	0	0	0	27	1
1987/88	Yomiuri	JSL Division 1	22	2	5	0	1	0	28	2
1988/89	Yomiuri	JSL Division 1	20	0	3	1	3	1	26	2
1989/90	Yomiuri	JSL Division 1	10	0	1	0	1	0	12	0
1990/91	Yomiuri	JSL Division 1	21	3	2	0	2	0	25	3
1991/92	Yomiuri	JSL Division 1	20	0	5	0	0	0	25	0
1992	Verdy Kawasaki	J1 League	-		5	0	9	1	14	1
1993	Verdy Kawasaki	J1 League	1	0	0	0	1	0	2	0
1993	Shimizu S-Pulse	J1 League	14	0	3	0	0	0	17	0
1994	Shimizu S-Pulse	J1 League	6	0	0	0	0	0	6	0
1994	Verdy Kawasaki	J1 League	7	0	0	0	0	0	7	0
Total			243	11	50	4	27	4	320	19

== National team statistics ==
Japan national team
Year	Apps	Goals
1978	5	1
1979	0	0
1980	3	0
1981	8	1
1982	8	0
1983	7	1
1984	6	1
1985	8	0
1986	5	0
1987	11	2
Total	61	6

== Managerial statistics ==
Team	From	To	Record				
Team	From	To	G	W	D	L	Win %
Verdy Kawasaki	1997	1997	12	4	0	8	33.33
Shonan Bellmare	2000	2000	40	15	1	24	37.50
Kyoto Sanga FC	2007	2010	90	28	23	39	31.11
Total			142	47	24	71	33.10

== Awards ==
- Japan Soccer League Best Eleven (9): 1981, 1982, 1983, 1984, 1985-86, 1986-87, 1987-88, 1990-91, 1991-92
- Japan Football Hall of Fame: Inducted in 2018
