= Junichi Watanabe (footballer) =

Japanese footballer

Junichi Watanabe 渡辺 淳一
Personal information
- Full name: Junichi Watanabe
- Date of birth: May 20, 1973 (age 53)
- Place of birth: Tokyo, Japan
- Height: 1.68 m (5 ft 6 in)
- Position: Midfielder

Youth career
- 1989–1991: Yomiuri

Senior career*
| Years | Team | Apps | (Gls) |
| 1992–1998 | Verdy Kawasaki | 36 | (1) |
| 1999 | XV Novembro Jaú | | |
| 2000–2001 | Shonan Bellmare | 39 | (2) |
| Total | | 75 | (3) |
Medal record
Verdy Kawasaki
| Winner | J1 League | 1993 |
| Winner | J1 League | 1994 |
| Runner-up | J1 League | 1995 |
| Winner | J.League Cup | 1992 |
| Winner | J.League Cup | 1993 |
| Winner | J.League Cup | 1994 |
| Runner-up | J.League Cup | 1996 |
| Winner | Emperor's Cup | 1996 |
| Runner-up | Emperor's Cup | 1992 |
- * Club domestic league appearances and goals

Junichi Watanabe (渡辺 淳一, Watanabe Junichi; born May 20, 1973) is a former Japanese football player.

== Playing career ==
Watanabe was born in Tokyo on May 20, 1973. He joined Verdy Kawasaki from youth team in 1992. Although he played as midfielder, he could not become a regular player behind Ruy Ramos, Tsuyoshi Kitazawa, Bismarck, Masakiyo Maezono and so on. In 1999, he moved to Brazilian club XV Novembro Jaú. In 2000, he returned to Japan and joined Shonan Bellmare. Although he became a regular player in 2000, his opportunity to play decreased in 2001 and retired end of 2001 season.

== Club statistics ==
| Club performance | | | League | | Cup | | League Cup | | Total | |
| Season | Club | League | Apps | Goals | Apps | Goals | Apps | Goals | Apps | Goals |
| Japan | | | League | | Emperor's Cup | | J.League Cup | | Total | |
|---|---|---|---|---|---|---|---|---|---|---|
| 1992 | Verdy Kawasaki | J1 League | - | | | | 0 | 0 | 0 | 0 |
| 1993 | Verdy Kawasaki | J1 League | 0 | 0 | | | 0 | 0 | 0 | 0 |
| 1994 | Verdy Kawasaki | J1 League | 1 | 0 | 0 | 0 | 0 | 0 | 1 | 0 |
| 1995 | Verdy Kawasaki | J1 League | 11 | 0 | 0 | 0 | - | | 11 | 0 |
| 1996 | Verdy Kawasaki | J1 League | 7 | 0 | 2 | 0 | 1 | 0 | 10 | 0 |
| 1997 | Verdy Kawasaki | J1 League | 12 | 1 | 0 | 0 | 4 | 1 | 16 | 2 |
| 1998 | Verdy Kawasaki | J1 League | 5 | 0 | | | 0 | 0 | 5 | 0 |
| 2000 | Shonan Bellmare | J2 League | 32 | 2 | | | 1 | 0 | 33 | 2 |
| 2001 | Shonan Bellmare | J2 League | 7 | 0 | | | 1 | 0 | 8 | 0 |
| Total | | | 75 | 3 | 2 | 0 | 7 | 1 | 84 | 4 |
