= 1992 Verdy Kawasaki season =

Verdy Kawasaki
1992 season
- Manager: Pepe
- Stadium: Kawasaki Todoroki Stadium
- Emperor's Cup: Runners-up
- J.League Cup: Champions (→Asian Club Championship)
- Asian Club Championship: 4th
- Top goalscorer: League: All: Kazuyoshi Miura (11)

1992 Verdy Kawasaki season

== Team name ==
Club name
Yomiuri Nihon Soccer Club
Nickname
Yomiuri Verdy

== Competitions ==
Competitions	Position
Emperor's Cup	Runners-up
J.League Cup	Champions
Asian Club Championship	4th

== Domestic results ==
=== Emperor's Cup ===
5 December 1992 1st Round	Verdy Kawasaki	2–0	Fukuoka University	Saga Stadium
: JST (UTC+09:00)	Kitazawa ?', ?'

6 December 1992 2nd Round	Verdy Kawasaki	1–0	Yamaha Motor	Saga Stadium
: JST (UTC+09:00)	Ramos ?'

20 December 1992 Quarterfinals	Verdy Kawasaki	1–1 (a.e.t.) (4–2 p)	Gamba Osaka	Expo '70 Commemorative Stadium
: JST (UTC+09:00)	Pereira 27'		Nagashima ?'

23 December 1992 Semifinals	Verdy Kawasaki	2–2 (a.e.t.) (4–3 p)	Urawa Red Diamonds	Tokyo National Stadium
13:10 JST (UTC+09:00)	Takeda 31'; Miura 53'		Hirose 36'; Fukuda 41'	Attendance: 48,000; Referee: Hideo Kikuchi

1 January 1993 Final	Verdy Kawasaki	1–2 (a.e.t.)	Yokohama Marinos	Tokyo National Stadium
: JST (UTC+09:00)	Nakamura 83'		Mizunuma 74'; Jinno 102'

=== J.League Cup ===
6 September 1992 GL-1	Sanfrecce Hiroshima	2–3	Verdy Kawasaki	Hiroshima Stadium
19:00 JST (UTC+09:00)	Moriyasu 25'; Takagi 51'	J. League	Pereira 40'; Tsunami 53'; Takeda 76'	Attendance: 13,861; Referee: Kenji Tanaka; Assistant referees: Kazuya Yanagisawa; Ryōichi Nishida; Fourth official: Shinji Saga

9 September 1992 GL-2	Kashima Antlers	4–3 (sudden-death) (a.e.t.)	Verdy Kawasaki	Tokyo National Stadium
19:00 JST (UTC+09:00)	Hasegawa 18' 114'; Kurosaki 48'; Zico 50'	J. League	Miura 8'; Kitazawa 39'; Takeda 54'	Attendance: 18,009; Referee: Tatsumi Ōno; Assistant referees: Takeshi Ōkura; Naotsugu Fuse; Fourth official: Ryōichi Mogi

12 September 1992 GL-3	Verdy Kawasaki	1–0	Urawa Red Diamonds	Kawasaki Todoroki Stadium
19:00 JST (UTC+09:00)	Miura 88' (pen.)	J. League		Attendance: 9,022; Referee: Kiyoshi Ōta; Assistant referees: Masayoshi Okada; Noboru Ishiyama; Fourth official: Michio Nakahara

19 September 1992 GL-4	Verdy Kawasaki	5–2	Gamba Osaka	Kawasaki Todoroki Stadium
19:00 JST (UTC+09:00)	Miura 31', 53', 72'; Takeda 43'; H. Katō 64'	J. League	Müller 47', 62'	Attendance: 7,568; Referee: Hitoshi Yamada; Assistant referees: Takeshi Ōkura; Takashi Kunori; Fourth official: Tsuneo Katō

23 September 1992 GL-5	JEF United Ichihara	1–0 (sudden-death) (a.e.t.)	Verdy Kawasaki	Chiba Sports Stadium
14:04 JST (UTC+09:00)	Pavel 95'	J. League		Attendance: 16,607; Referee: Tatsumi Ōno; Assistant referees: Kōetsu Kikuchi; Masahiro Katagiri; Fourth official: Yasuhiro Matsuzaki

26 September 1992 GL-6	Verdy Kawasaki	3–0	Yokohama Flügels	Tokyo National Stadium
15:00 JST (UTC+09:00)	Miura 12', 66'; Kikuhara 19'	J. League		Attendance: 10,317; Referee: Shizuo Takada; Assistant referees: Keiichi Sunakawa; Kimio Izaki; Fourth official: Masashi Kajino

3 October 1992 GL-7	Yokohama Marinos	2–1 (sudden-death) (a.e.t.)	Verdy Kawasaki	Tokyo National Stadium
15:35 JST (UTC+09:00)	Omura 71'; Jinno 103'	J. League	Takeda 55'	Attendance: 34,374; Referee: Hideo Kikuchi; Assistant referees: Shizuo Takada; Takeshi Ōkura; Fourth official: Masao Tanaka

7 October 1992 GL-8	Verdy Kawasaki	1–0	Shimizu S-Pulse	Tokyo National Stadium
19:00 JST (UTC+09:00)	Ramos 43'	J. League		Attendance: 39,032; Referee: Shizuo Takada; Assistant referees: Hideo Kikuchi; Naotsugu Fuse; Fourth official: Masashi Kajino

11 October 1992 GL-9	Nagoya Grampus Eight	0–1	Verdy Kawasaki	Mie Sports Garden
14:03 JST (UTC+09:00)		J. League	Miura 16' (pen.)	Attendance: 11,794; Referee: Yū Nakamura; Assistant referees: Yoshio Sawada; Yasushi Tsuchimoto; Fourth official: Mikio Fukuoka

16 October 1992 Semifinals	Verdy Kawasaki	1–0	Kashima Antlers	Tokyo National Stadium
19:04 JST (UTC+09:00)	Miura 64'	J. League		Attendance: 39,390; Referee: Hideo Kikuchi; Assistant referees: Masayoshi Okada; Yū Nakamura; Fourth official: Keizō Yamazaki

23 November 1992 Final	Verdy Kawasaki	1–0	Shimizu S-Pulse	Tokyo National Stadium
14:00 JST (UTC+09:00)	Miura 57'	J. League		Attendance: 56,000; Referee: Masahiro Sogawa; Assistant referees: Fumikazu Shioyazono; Hitoshi Yamada; Fourth official: Kōetsu Kikuchi

== International results ==
=== Asian Club Championship ===
1st Round	bye

12 December 1992 2nd Round-1	(China) Liaoning	3–3	(Japan) Verdy Kawasaki	Chengdu, China PR
	? ?' ? ?' ? ?'		Ramos ?'; Y. Katō ?'; Paulinho ?'

17 December 1992 2nd Round-2	(Japan) Verdy Kawasaki	1–1 (4a–4 agg.)	(China) Liaoning	Tokyo, Japan
	Pereira ?'		? ?'	Stadium: Tokyo National Stadium

12 January 1993 Quarterfinals-1	(Japan) Verdy Kawasaki	0–0	(Saudi Arabia) Al Shabab	Bahrain

14 January 1993 Quarterfinals-2	(Japan) Verdy Kawasaki	2–0	(Bahrain) Al-Muharraq	Bahrain
	Paulinho ?', ?'

16 January 1993 Quarterfinals-3	(Japan) Verdy Kawasaki	3–0	(Indonesia) Arseto	Bahrain
	Y. Katō ?'; Abe ?' ?' (o.g.)

20 January 1993 Semifinals	(Japan) Verdy Kawasaki	1–2 (a.e.t.)	(Iran) Pas	Bahrain
	Y. Katō 23'		? 67' ? 91'

22 January 1993 3rd place	(Japan) Verdy Kawasaki	3–4	(United Arab Emirates) Al-Wasl	Bahrain
	Fujiyoshi ?'; H. Katō ?'; Yoneyama ?'		? ?' ? ?' ? ?' ? ?'

== Player statistics ==
No.	Pos	Nat	Player	Total		Emperor's Cup		J-League Cup		Asian Club Championship	
No.	Pos	Nat	Player	Apps	Goals	Apps	Goals	Apps	Goals	Apps	Goals
	GK	(Japan) JPN	Takayuki Fujikawa	3	0	0	0	2	0	1	0
	GK	(Japan) JPN	Shinkichi Kikuchi	20	0	5	0	9	0	6	0
	GK	(Japan) JPN	Hiroki Koike	0	0	0	0	0	0	0	0
	GK	(Japan) JPN	Kōji Arimoto	0	0	0	0	0	0	0	0
	GK	(Japan) JPN	Manabu Konno	0	0	0	0	0	0	0	0
	DF	(Japan) JPN	Hisashi Katō	20	2	5	0	9	1	6	1
	DF	(Brazil) BRA	Pereira	20	3	5	1	11	1	4	1
	DF	(Japan) JPN	Satoshi Tsunami	16	1	3	0	11	1	2	0
	DF	(Japan) JPN	Hirokazu Sasaki	7	0	2	0	0	0	5	0
	DF	(Brazil) BRA	Davi	8	0	0	0	8	0	0	0
	DF	(Japan) JPN	Yoshiyuki Katō	8	3	2	0	0	0	6	3
	DF	(Japan) JPN	Nobuyuki Arai	0	0	0	0	0	0	0	0
	DF	(Japan) JPN	Kō Ishikawa	19	0	5	0	8	0	6	0
	DF	(Japan) JPN	Tadashi Nakamura	7	1	2	1	0	0	5	0
	DF	(Japan) JPN	Mitsuhiro Kawamoto	0	0	0	0	0	0	0	0
	DF	(Japan) JPN	Kōichi Togashi	0	0	0	0	0	0	0	0
	DF	(Japan) JPN	Naoto Tomaru	0	0	0	0	0	0	0	0
	DF	(Japan) JPN	Tatsuya Murata	0	0	0	0	0	0	0	0
	DF	(Japan) JPN	Takashi Yamaguchi	0	0	0	0	0	0	0	0
	MF	(Japan) JPN	Ruy Ramos	14	3	4	1	8	1	2	1
	MF	(Japan) JPN	Tetsuji Hashiratani	17	0	5	0	11	0	1	0
	MF	(Japan) JPN	Tsuyoshi Kitazawa	14	3	2	2	11	1	1	0
	MF	(Japan) JPN	Ryūichi Yoneyama	3	1	0	0	0	0	3	1
	MF	(Japan) JPN	Shirō Kikuhara	16	1	2	0	8	1	6	0
	MF	(Japan) JPN	Keiji Takao	0	0	0	0	0	0	0	0
	MF	(Japan) JPN	Nobuyuki Hosaka	0	0	0	0	0	0	0	0
	MF	(Japan) JPN	Osamu Takada	0	0	0	0	0	0	0	0
	MF	(Japan) JPN	Hideki Nagai	13	0	4	0	3	0	6	0
	MF	(Japan) JPN	Tomohiro Hasumi	0	0	0	0	0	0	0	0
	MF	(Japan) JPN	Kōji Seki	0	0	0	0	0	0	0	0
	MF	(Japan) JPN	Junichi Watanabe	0	0	0	0	0	0	0	0
	MF	(Japan) JPN	Takayuki Yamaguchi	4	0	0	0	0	0	4	0
	FW	(Japan) JPN	Tetsuya Totsuka	18	0	3	0	10	0	5	0
	FW	(Brazil) BRA	Ferreira	1	0	0	0	1	0	0	0
	FW	(Japan) JPN	Masahiro Sukigara	4	0	0	0	1	0	3	0
	FW	(Japan) JPN	Kazuyoshi Miura	16	11	5	1	10	10	1	0
	FW	(Japan) JPN	Nobuhiro Takeda	18	5	5	1	11	4	2	0
	FW	(Japan) JPN	Shinji Fujiyoshi	5	1	1	0	0	0	4	1
	FW	(Japan) JPN	Haruo Hiroyama	0	0	0	0	0	0	0	0
	FW	(Brazil) BRA	Paulinho	12	3	3	0	2	0	7	3
	FW	(Japan) JPN	Osamu Shinohara	0	0	0	0	0	0	0	0
	FW	(Japan) JPN	Yoshinori Abe	8	1	2	0	4	0	2	1
	FW	(Japan) JPN	Tsuyoshi Yamamoto	0	0	0	0	0	0	0	0
	FW	(Japan) JPN	Toshimi Kikuchi	0	0	0	0	0	0	0	0
	FW	(Japan) JPN	Kazuyoshi Seki	0	0	0	0	0	0	0	0
	FW	(Brazil) BRA	Amoroso	0	0	0	0	0	0	0	0

- J.LEAGUE OFFICIAL GUIDE 1992-1993. ISBN 4-09-102301-0.
- J.LEAGUE OFFICIAL GUIDE 1993 Suntory series. ISBN 4-09-102303-7.
- クラブサッカーの始祖鳥 読売クラブ〜ヴェルディの40年. Tokyo Verdy 1969 football club. 2010.
- J.LEAGUE YEARBOOK 1999. ISBN 4-88752-099-9.

== Transfers ==
In:

No.	Pos.	Nation	Player
—	DF	JPN	Kō Ishikawa (from Honda)
—	MF	JPN	Tetsuji Hashiratani (from Nissan)
—	MF	JPN	Hideki Nagai (from Kokushikan University)
—	DF	BRA	Pereira (from Guarani FC)
—	DF	BRA	Davi (from Universitario)
—	FW	BRA	Ferreira (from Vitória FC)
—	GK	JPN	Hiroki Koike (from Yomiuri Junior)
—	GK	JPN	Kōji Arimoto (from Yomiuri Junior)
—	GK	JPN	Manabu Konno (from Akita Shogyo High School)
—	DF	JPN	Nobuyuki Arai (from Yomiuri Junior)
—	DF	JPN	Naoto Tomaru (from Yomiuri Junior)
—	DF	JPN	Tomohiro Hasumi (from Yomiuri Junior)
—	DF	JPN	Tatsuya Murata (from Yomiuri Junior)
—	DF	JPN	Takashi Yamaguchi (from Yomiuri Junior)
—	MF	JPN	Keiji Takao (from Yomiuri Junior)
—	MF	JPN	Nobuyuki Hosaka (from Yomiuri Junior)
—	MF	JPN	Osamu Takada (from Yomiuri Junior)
—	MF	JPN	Junichi Watanabe (from Yomiuri Junior)
—	MF	JPN	Takayuki Yamaguchi (from Yomiuri youth)
—	FW	JPN	Haruo Hiroyama (from Yomiuri Junior)
—	FW	JPN	Osamu Shinohara (from Yomiuri Junior)
—	FW	JPN	Tsuyoshi Yamamoto (from Yomiuri Junior)
—	FW	JPN	Toshimi Kikuchi (from Tono High School)
—	FW	JPN	Kazuyoshi Seki (from Omiya Higashi High School)
—	FW	BRA	Paulinho (from Guarani FC)
—	FW	BRA	Amoroso (from Guarani FC)
—	DF	JPN	Hirokazu Sasaki (from Matsushita)

Out:

No.	Pos.	Nation	Player
2	DF	JPN	Yasuharu Kurata
4	DF	JPN	Takumi Horiike (to Shimizu S-Pulse)
7	DF	JPN	Yasutoshi Miura (to Shimizu S-Pulse)
15	MF	BRA	Pericles
17	MF	JPN	Hiroshi Saitō
20	FW	BRA	Toninho (to Shimizu S-Pulse)
21	GK	JPN	Kazuya Nakamura

- Yomiuri Junior is second team of Yomiuri SC (Verdy Kawasaki).

== Transfers during the season ==
=== In ===
none

=== Out ===
none

== Awards ==
- J.League Cup Most Valuable Player: (Japan) Kazuyoshi Miura

== Other pages ==
- (in Japanese) J. League official site
- (in Japanese) Tokyo Verdy official site
