= Satoshi Tsunami =

Japanese footballer and manager

Satoshi Tsunami 都並 敏史
Personal information
- Full name: Satoshi Tsunami
- Date of birth: 14 August 1961 (age 65)
- Place of birth: Setagaya, Tokyo, Japan
- Height: 1.75 m (5 ft 9 in)
- Position: Defender

Team information
- Current team: Briobecca Urayasu (manager)

Youth career
- 1977–1979: Yomiuri

Senior career*
Years	Team	Apps	(Gls)
1980–1995	Verdy Kawasaki	230	(5)
1996–1997	Avispa Fukuoka	21	(0)
1997–1998	Bellmare Hiratsuka	11	(0)
Total		262	(5)

International career
1980–1995	Japan	78	(2)

Managerial career
- 2005: Vegalta Sendai
- 2007: Cerezo Osaka
- 2008: Yokohama FC
- 2019–: Briobecca Urayasu
Medal record
Verdy Kawasaki
Winner	Japan Soccer League	1983
Winner	Japan Soccer League	1984
Winner	Japan Soccer League	1986/87
Winner	Japan Soccer League	1990/91
Winner	Japan Soccer League	1991/92
Runner-up	Japan Soccer League	1981
Runner-up	Japan Soccer League	1989/90
Winner	J1 League	1993
Winner	J1 League	1994
Runner-up	J1 League	1995
Winner	JSL Cup	1985
Winner	JSL Cup	1991
Winner	J.League Cup	1992
Winner	J.League Cup	1993
Winner	J.League Cup	1994
Winner	Emperor's Cup	1984
Winner	Emperor's Cup	1986
Winner	Emperor's Cup	1987
Runner-up	Emperor's Cup	1981
Runner-up	Emperor's Cup	1991
Runner-up	Emperor's Cup	1992
Representing Japan
AFC Asian Cup
Gold medal – first place	1992 Japan
- * Club domestic league appearances and goals

Satoshi Tsunami (都並 敏史, Tsunami Satoshi; born 14 August 1961) is a Japanese football manager and former player. He is currently manager of Japan Football League club, Briobecca Urayasu. He last played for Japan national team until 1995.

== Club career ==
Tsunami was a product of Yomiuri (later Verdy Kawasaki) youth system. He joined Japan Soccer League side Yomiuri in 1980. The club won the champions in Japan Soccer League 5 times, JSL Cup 3 times and Emperor's Cup 3 times. This was golden era in club history. He was also selected Best Eleven 3 times (1982, 1983 and 1984). In 1992, Japan Soccer League was folded and founded new league J1 League. However he lost opportunity to play after that. Toward the end of his career, he played for Avispa Fukuoka (1996–1997) and Bellmare Hiratsuka (1997–1998). He retired in 1998. He played 267 games and scored 5 goals in the league.

== National team career ==
Tsunami was capped 78 times and scored 2 goals for the Japan national team between 1980 and 1995. He made his first international appearance on 22 December 1980 in a 1982 World Cup qualification against Singapore in Hong Kong. He scored his first international goal on 20 September 1986 in an Asian Games match against Nepal in Daejeon, South Korea. After 1988 Summer Olympics qualification in 1987, he ceased to be selected Japan.

In May 1992, Tsunami was selected Japan for the first time in 5 years. He was a member of the Japan team that won the 1992 Asian Cup. He played all the Japan games except one for which he wasn't eligible due to suspension.

He was such a key player that national coach Hans Ooft named him a member of the Japan squad for the 1994 World Cup qualification stage for the 1994 World Cup in spite of his injury. However, he could not play any game in the competition that was centrally held in Doha, Qatar as his recovery wasn't as good as Ooft had wished it to be. Japan's hope to qualify for the finals was dashed by a stoppage time Iraqi equaliser in the last qualifying match. The Japanese fans now refer to this match as the Agony of Doha, and his absence was one of the main reasons why Japan's campaign ended up unsuccessful.

== Coaching career ==
After finishing his playing career, Tsunami worked as a pundit on television and as a coach at Tokyo Verdy's youth setup. He acquired the S-Class Coaching License that was a prerequisite to manage a J.League club in 2004.

In 2005, he was appointed the manager of J2 League side Vegalta Sendai. Vegalta finished fourth and failed to gain the promotion. Tsunami was dismissed after one season. In 2006, he became an assistant coach to new manager Ruy Ramos at another J2 side Tokyo Verdy. Again the team failed to move up and he was sacked after one season. In 2007, he became the manager of newly relegated J2 side Cerezo Osaka but was dismissed in May after a bad start.

In 2008, he was appointed as the manager of J2 League club Yokohama FC but was fired at the end of the 2008 season.

On 20 November 2018, Tsunami announcement officially manager of Briobecca Urayasu starting from 2019. He return as football manager after 11 years absence.

== Personal life ==
His son, Yuta Tsunami is also a footballer and currently play in Nara Club.

== Club statistics ==
Club performance			League		Cup		League Cup		Total	
Season	Club	League	Apps	Goals	Apps	Goals	Apps	Goals	Apps	Goals
Japan			League		Emperor's Cup		J.League Cup		Total	
1980	Yomiuri	JSL Division 1	12	2	3	0	2	1	17	3
1981	Yomiuri	JSL Division 1	18	1	5	0	1	0	24	1
1982	Yomiuri	JSL Division 1	17	0	3	0	1	0	21	0
1983	Yomiuri	JSL Division 1	18	0	3	0	3	0	24	0
1984	Yomiuri	JSL Division 1	18	1	5	0	0	0	23	1
1985/86	Yomiuri	JSL Division 1	21	0	2	0	4	1	27	1
1986/87	Yomiuri	JSL Division 1	19	0	3	0	1	0	23	0
1987/88	Yomiuri	JSL Division 1	10	0	4	0	1	0	15	0
1988/89	Yomiuri	JSL Division 1	21	0	3	0	3	1	27	1
1989/90	Yomiuri	JSL Division 1	10	0	4	0	4	0	18	0
1990/91	Yomiuri	JSL Division 1	21	1	2	0	2	0	25	1
1991/92	Yomiuri	JSL Division 1	21	0	4	1	5	0	30	1
1992	Verdy Kawasaki	J1 League	-		3	0	11	1	14	1
1993	Verdy Kawasaki	J1 League	5	0	0	0	0	0	5	0
1994	Verdy Kawasaki	J1 League	8	0	2	1	0	0	10	1
1995	Verdy Kawasaki	J1 League	16	0	0	0	-		16	0
1996	Avispa Fukuoka	J1 League	21	0	1	0	11	0	33	0
1997	Avispa Fukuoka	J1 League	0	0	0	0	0	0	0	0
1997	Bellmare Hiratsuka	J1 League	6	0	0	0	0	0	6	0
1998	Bellmare Hiratsuka	J1 League	5	0	0	0	4	0	9	0
Total			267	5	47	2	53	4	367	11

== National team statistics ==
Japan national team
Year	Apps	Goals
1980	3	0
1981	7	0
1982	8	0
1983	10	0
1984	5	0
1985	7	0
1986	5	2
1987	10	0
1988	0	0
1989	0	0
1990	0	0
1991	0	0
1992	10	0
1993	10	0
1994	0	0
1995	3	0
Total	78	2

== Managerial statistics ==
As of the end 2024 season.

Team	From	To	Record				
Team	From	To	G	W	D	L	Win %
Vegalta Sendai	2005		44	19	11	14	43.18
Cerezo Osaka	2007		13	4	3	6	30.77
Yokohama FC	2008		42	11	17	14	26.19
Briobecca Urayasu	2022	present	144	68	33	43	47.22
Total			243	102	64	77	41.98

== Honours and awards ==
=== Team honours ===
- 1992 Asian Cup (Champions)

=== Manager ===
Briobecca Urayasu

- Shakaijin Cup: 2022
- Japanese Regional Football Champions League: 2022
