= Yoshiyuki Kato =

Japanese footballer and manager

Yoshiyuki Kato 加藤 善之
Personal information
- Full name: Yoshiyuki Kato
- Date of birth: July 27, 1964 (age 62)
- Place of birth: Tokyo, Japan
- Height: 1.75 m (5 ft 9 in)
- Positions: Defender; midfielder

Youth career
- 1980–1982: Gyosei High School

Senior career*
Years	Team	Apps	(Gls)
1983–1994	Verdy Kawasaki	71	(4)
1995	Fukuoka Blux	7	(0)
Total		78	(4)

Managerial career
- 2011: Matsumoto Yamaga FC
Medal record
Verdy Kawasaki
Winner	Japan Soccer League	1983
Winner	Japan Soccer League	1984
Winner	Japan Soccer League	1986/87
Winner	Japan Soccer League	1990/91
Winner	Japan Soccer League	1991/92
Runner-up	Japan Soccer League	1989/90
Winner	J1 League	1993
Winner	J1 League	1994
Winner	JSL Cup	1985
Winner	JSL Cup	1991
Winner	J.League Cup	1992
Winner	J.League Cup	1993
Winner	J.League Cup	1994
Winner	Emperor's Cup	1984
Winner	Emperor's Cup	1986
Winner	Emperor's Cup	1987
Runner-up	Emperor's Cup	1991
Runner-up	Emperor's Cup	1992
- * Club domestic league appearances and goals

Yoshiyuki Kato (加藤 善之, Katō Yoshiyuki; born July 27, 1964) is a former Japanese football player and manager.

== Playing career ==
Kato was born in Tokyo on July 27, 1964. After graduating from high school, he joined Yomiuri (later Verdy Kawasaki) in 1983. Although he played many matches in the late 1980s, he could not become a regular player at the club which had many Japan national team players. In 1995, he moved to Japan Football League club Fukuoka Blux. He retired at the end of the 1995 season.

== Coaching career ==
In 2009, Kato became a general manager for Regional Leagues club Matsumoto Yamaga FC. The club was promoted to Japan Football League end of 2009 season. In June 2011, manager Hideo Yoshizawa was sacked and Kato became new manager as Yoshizawa successor. The club finished the 4th place in 2011 and won the Qualify to promoted to J2 League. However Kato did not have license for J.League manager, he resigned as manager and returned to general manager.

== Club statistics ==
Club performance			League		Cup		League Cup		Total	
Season	Club	League	Apps	Goals	Apps	Goals	Apps	Goals	Apps	Goals
Japan			League		Emperor's Cup		J.League Cup		Total	
1983	Yomiuri	JSL Division 1	0	0	0	0	0	0	0	0
1984	Yomiuri	JSL Division 1	0	0	0	0	1	0	1	0
1985/86	Yomiuri	JSL Division 1	0	0	0	0	0	0	0	0
1986/87	Yomiuri	JSL Division 1	6	0	0	0	0	0	6	0
1987/88	Yomiuri	JSL Division 1	15	0	0	0	1	0	16	0
1988/89	Yomiuri	JSL Division 1	20	4	3	0	1	0	24	4
1989/90	Yomiuri	JSL Division 1	6	0	1	0	4	2	11	2
1990/91	Yomiuri	JSL Division 1	9	0	2	0	0	0	11	0
1991/92	Yomiuri	JSL Division 1	2	0	0	0	1	0	3	0
1992	Verdy Kawasaki	J1 League	-		2	0	0	0	2	0
1993	Verdy Kawasaki	J1 League	7	1	1	0	7	1	15	2
1994	Verdy Kawasaki	J1 League	6	0	0	0	0	0	6	0
1995	Fukuoka Blux	Football League	7	0	0	0	-		7	0
Total			78	5	9	0	15	3	102	8
