= Nobuyuki Hosaka =

Japanese footballer

Nobuyuki Hosaka 保坂 信之
Personal information
- Full name: Nobuyuki Hosaka
- Date of birth: July 23, 1970 (age 56)
- Place of birth: Saitama, Japan
- Height: 1.72 m (5 ft 7 1/2 in)
- Position: Midfielder

Youth career
- Teikyo High School
- Tokai University

Senior career*
Years	Team	Apps	(Gls)
1990–1993	Verdy Kawasaki	0	(0)
1994–1995	Urawa Reds	17	(0)
1996–1998	Kawasaki Frontale	15	(1)
Total		32	(1)
Medal record
Verdy Kawasaki
Winner	Japan Soccer League	1990/91
Winner	Japan Soccer League	1991/92
Runner-up	Japan Soccer League	1989/90
Winner	J1 League	1993
Winner	JSL Cup	1991
Winner	J.League Cup	1992
Winner	J.League Cup	1993
Runner-up	Emperor's Cup	1991
Runner-up	Emperor's Cup	1992
- * Club domestic league appearances and goals

Nobuyuki Hosaka (保坂 信之, Hosaka Nobuyuki; born July 23, 1970) is a former Japanese football player who is the current first-team coach J2 League club of Tokyo Verdy.

== Playing career ==
Hosaka was born in Saitama on July 23, 1970. After graduating from Tokai University, he joined Yomiuri (later Verdy Kawasaki) in 1990. He played on the reserve team until 1992. Although he was promoted to the top team in 1992, he did not play in any matches. In 1994, he moved to his local club, the Urawa Reds. In early 1994, he became a regular player as defensive midfielder. However he did not play in matches starting in late 1994. In 1996, he moved to the Japan Football League club Fujitsu (later Kawasaki Frontale). He retired at the end of the 1998 season.

== Club statistics ==
Club performance			League		Cup		League Cup		Total	
Season	Club	League	Apps	Goals	Apps	Goals	Apps	Goals	Apps	Goals
Japan			League		Emperor's Cup		J.League Cup		Total	
1990/91	Yomiuri	JSL Division 1	0	0	0	0	0	0	0	0
1991/92	Yomiuri	JSL Division 1	0	0	0	0	0	0	0	0
1992	Verdy Kawasaki	J1 League	-		0	0	0	0	0	0
1993	Verdy Kawasaki	J1 League	0	0	0	0	0	0	0	0
1994	Urawa Reds	J1 League	17	0	0	0	0	0	17	0
1995	Urawa Reds	J1 League	0	0	0	0	-		0	0
Total			17	0	0	0	0	0	17	0
