= Shinkichi Kikuchi =

Japanese footballer

Shinkichi Kikuchi 菊池 新吉
Personal information
- Full name: Shinkichi Kikuchi
- Date of birth: April 12, 1967 (age 59)
- Place of birth: Tono, Iwate, Japan
- Height: 1.82 m (5 ft 11 1/2 in)
- Position: Goalkeeper

Youth career
- 1983–1985: Tono High School

Senior career*
Years	Team	Apps	(Gls)
1986–2001	Tokyo Verdy	280	(0)
2000	→ Kawasaki Frontale (loan)	6	(0)
Total		286	(0)

International career
1994–1995	Japan	7	(0)
Medal record
Tokyo Verdy
Winner	Japan Soccer League	1986/87
Winner	Japan Soccer League	1990/91
Winner	Japan Soccer League	1991/92
Runner-up	Japan Soccer League	1989/90
Winner	J1 League	1993
Winner	J1 League	1994
Runner-up	J1 League	1995
Winner	JSL Cup	1991
Winner	J.League Cup	1992
Winner	J.League Cup	1993
Winner	J.League Cup	1994
Runner-up	J.League Cup	1996
Winner	Emperor's Cup	1986
Winner	Emperor's Cup	1987
Winner	Emperor's Cup	1996
Runner-up	Emperor's Cup	1991
Runner-up	Emperor's Cup	1992
Kawasaki Frontale
Runner-up	J.League Cup	2000
- * Club domestic league appearances and goals

Shinkichi Kikuchi (菊池 新吉, Kikuchi Shinkichi; born April 12, 1967) is a former Japanese football player. He played for Japan national team. His younger brother Toshimi is also a former footballer.

== Club career ==
Kikuchi was born in Tono on April 12, 1967. After graduating from high school, he joined Japan Soccer League club Yomiuri (later Verdy Kawasaki, Tokyo Verdy) in 1986. The club won league champions 3 times, JSL Cup 1 time and Emperor's Cup 2 times. In Asia, the club also won 1987 Asian Club Championship. In 1992, Japan Soccer League was folded and founded new league J1 League. The club won the league champions in 1993 and 1994. The club also won 1992, 1993, 1994 J.League Cup and 1996 Emperor's Cup. He was a central player in golden era in both clubs history. In 1999, he lost opportunity to play behind Kenji Honnami. In 2000, Kikuchi moved to Kawasaki Frontale on loan. In 2001, he returned to Tokyo Verdy and retired with his rival Honnami end of the season.

== National team career ==
On September 27, 1994, Kikuchi debuted for Japan national team against Australia. In October, he played all matches at 1994 Asian Games. He was also selected Japan for 1995 King Fahd Cup. But he did not play in the match, as he was the team's reserve goalkeeper behind Shigetatsu Matsunaga. He played 7 games for Japan until 1995.

== Club statistics ==
Club performance			League		Cup		League Cup		Total	
Season	Club	League	Apps	Goals	Apps	Goals	Apps	Goals	Apps	Goals
Japan			League		Emperor's Cup		J.League Cup		Total	
1986/87	Yomiuri	JSL Division 1	22	0	5	0	0	0	27	0
1987/88	Yomiuri	JSL Division 1	10	0	4	0	1	0	15	0
1988/89	Yomiuri	JSL Division 1	9	0	3	0	1	0	13	0
1989/90	Yomiuri	JSL Division 1	8	0	0	0	1	0	9	0
1990/91	Yomiuri	JSL Division 1	22	0	2	0	2	0	26	0
1991/92	Yomiuri	JSL Division 1	6	0	0	0	5	0	11	0
1992	Verdy Kawasaki	J1 League	-		5	0	9	0	14	0
1993	Verdy Kawasaki	J1 League	28	0	3	0	8	0	39	0
1994	Verdy Kawasaki	J1 League	39	0	2	0	2	0	43	0
1995	Verdy Kawasaki	J1 League	36	0	3	0	-		39	0
1996	Verdy Kawasaki	J1 League	30	0	5	0	15	0	50	0
1997	Verdy Kawasaki	J1 League	11	0	2	0	6	0	19	0
1998	Verdy Kawasaki	J1 League	33	0	2	0	4	0	39	0
1999	Verdy Kawasaki	J1 League	0	0	0	0	2	0	2	0
2000	Kawasaki Frontale	J1 League	6	0	0	0	0	0	6	0
2001	Tokyo Verdy	J1 League	16	0	3	0	2	0	21	0
Total			276	0	39	0	58	0	373	0

== National team statistics ==
Japan national team
Year	Apps	Goals
1994	5	0
1995	2	0
Total	7	0

== Awards ==
- J.League Best XI - 1994, 1995

== Honours ==
- Japan Soccer League: 1987, 1991, 1992
- J - League: 1993, 1994
- JSL Cup: 1991
- J - League Cup: 1992, 1993, 1994
- Emperor's Cup: 1986, 1987, 1996
