= 1993 Verdy Kawasaki season =

Verdy Kawasaki
1993 season
- Manager: Yasutarō Matsuki
- Stadium: Kawasaki Todoroki Stadium
- J.League Suntory Series NICOS Series: Champions Runners-up Champions
- Emperor's Cup: Quarterfinals
- J.League Cup: Champions
- Asian Club Championship: Continued
- Top goalscorer: League: Kazuyoshi Miura (20); All: Kazuyoshi Miura (25)
- Highest home attendance: 10,299 (vs Yokohama Flügels, 27 November 1993); 59,626 (vs Yokohama Marinos, 15 May 1993, Tokyo National Stadium)
- Lowest home attendance: 9,816 (vs Kashima Antlers, 26 May 1993)
- Average home league attendance: 25,235
Home colours	Away colours

1993 Verdy Kawasaki season

== Review and events ==
Verdy Kawasaki won J.League NICOS series (second stage).

=== League results summary ===
Overall								Home						Away					
Pld	W	D	L	GF	GA	GD	Pts	W	D	L	GF	GA	GD	W	D	L	GF	GA	GD
36	28	0	8	72	31	+41	84	16	0	2	35	8	+27	12	0	6	37	23	+14

Source: J.LEAGUE OFFICIAL RECORD & DATA 1994. ISBN 4-09-102309-6.

=== League results by round ===
J.League Suntory series (first stage)
Round	1	2	3	4	5	6	7	8	9	10	11	12	13	14	15	16	17	18
Ground	H	A	A	H	A	A	H	A	H	H	A	A	H	H	A	H	A	H
Result	L	L	W	W	L	W	W	L	W	W	L	L	W	W	W	W	W	W
Position	7	9	7	6	7	4	4	5	4	2	4	5	5	3	3	3	2	2

Source: J.LEAGUE OFFICIAL RECORD & DATA 1994. ISBN 4-09-102309-6.
A = Away; H = Home; W = Win; D = Draw; L = Loss

J.League NICOS series (second stage)
Round	1	2	3	4	5	6	7	8	9	10	11	12	13	14	15	16	17	18
Ground	A	H	H	H	H	H	A	H	A	A	H	A	A	A	H	A	H	A
Result	L	W	W	W	W	W	W	L	W	W	W	W	W	W	W	W	W	W
Position	9	7	4	3	3	2	2	2	2	2	1	1	1	1	1	1	1	1

Source: J.LEAGUE OFFICIAL RECORD & DATA 1994. ISBN 4-09-102309-6.
A = Away; H = Home; W = Win; D = Draw; L = Loss

== Competitions ==
Competitions	Position
J.League	Champions / 10 clubs
Emperor's Cup	Quarterfinals
J.League Cup	Champions
Asian Club Championship	Continued

== Domestic results ==
=== J.League ===
==== Suntory series ====
15 May 1993 1st-1	Verdy Kawasaki	1–2	Yokohama Marinos	Tokyo National Stadium
19:29 JST (UTC+09)	Meijer 19'	J. League	Everton 48'; Díaz 59'	Attendance: 59,626; Referee: Shinichirō Obata; Assistant referees: Hideo Kikuchi, Fumikazu Shioyazono; Fourth official: Kōetsu Kikuchi

19 May 1993 1st-2	JEF United Ichihara	2–1	Verdy Kawasaki	Tokyo National Stadium
19:02 JST (UTC+09)	Littbarski 66'; Sasaki 72'	J. League	Kitazawa 68'	Attendance: 46,959; Referee: Martin Bodenham; Assistant referees: Yū Nakamura, Takashi Kunori; Fourth official: Kaoru Nagase

22 May 1993 1st-3	Sanfrecce Hiroshima	1–2	Verdy Kawasaki	Hiroshima Big Arch
18:31 JST (UTC+09)	Matsuda 44'	J. League	Meijer 37'; Takeda 39'	Attendance: 36,863; Referee: Yōtarō Moritsu; Assistant referees: Sōichirō Kaneko, Masanori Watanabe

26 May 1993 1st-4	Verdy Kawasaki	1–0 (a.s.d.e.t.)	Kashima Antlers	Kawasaki Todoroki Stadium
19:02 JST (UTC+09)	Miura 96'	J. League		Attendance: 9,816; Referee: Fumikazu Shioyazono; Assistant referees: Naotsugu Fuse, Kimio Izaki

29 May 1993 1st-5	Urawa Red Diamonds	1–1 (a.s.d.e.t.) (4–2 p)	Verdy Kawasaki	Urawa Komaba Stadium
19:04 JST (UTC+09)	Kawano 49'	J. League	Hashiratani 6'	Attendance: 9,690; Referee: Masayoshi Okada; Assistant referees: Naotsugu Fuse, Kimio Izaki; Fourth official: Morihiko Yamaji
	Penalties
	(penalty scored) Trivisonno; (penalty scored) Hirose; (penalty scored) Fukuda; (penalty scored) Hori		(penalty missed) Hashiratani; (penalty scored) Miura; (penalty scored) Kitazawa; (penalty missed) Pereira

2 June 1993 1st-6	Shimizu S-Pulse	2–4	Verdy Kawasaki	Kusanagi Athletic Stadium
16:02 JST (UTC+09)	Edu 67'; Aoshima 87'	J. League	Hashiratani 48'; Takeda 65'; Kitazawa 71'; Miura 89'	Attendance: 18,113; Referee: Martin Bodenham; Assistant referees: Fumikazu Shioyazono, Kazunori Okada; Fourth official: Teruhito Kudō

5 June 1993 1st-7	Verdy Kawasaki	1–1 (a.s.d.e.t.) (5–4 p)	Yokohama Flügels	Tokyo National Stadium
15:03 JST (UTC+09)	Takeda 51'	J. League	Aldro 53'	Attendance: 54,995; Referee: Hideo Kikuchi; Assistant referees: Noboru Ishiyama, Takashi Kunori
	Penalties
	(penalty scored) Hashiratani; (penalty scored) Miura; (penalty scored) Kitazawa; (penalty scored) Pereira; (penalty scored) Totsuka		(penalty scored) Edu; (penalty scored) Maeda; (penalty missed) Aldro; (penalty scored) Iwai; (penalty scored) Moner

9 June 1993 1st-8	Nagoya Grampus Eight	3–1	Verdy Kawasaki	Tokyo National Stadium
19:04 JST (UTC+09)	Sawairi 15', 39'; Yonekura 59'	J. League	Totsuka 70'	Attendance: 56,335; Referee: Tetsuya Hamana; Assistant referees: Toshiyuki Mayuzumi, Masahiro Katagiri; Fourth official: Takayoshi Kashino

12 June 1993 1st-9	Verdy Kawasaki	1–0 (a.s.d.e.t.)	Gamba Osaka	Kawasaki Todoroki Stadium
15:02 JST (UTC+09)	Miura 92'	J. League		Attendance: 10,058; Referee: Kiyoshi Ōta; Assistant referees: Noboru Ishiyama, Kimio Izaki; Fourth official: Kazuo Shirato

16 June 1993 1st-10	Verdy Kawasaki	2–1	JEF United Ichihara	Kawasaki Todoroki Stadium
19:02 JST (UTC+09)	Hanssen 86'; Takeda 89'	J. League	Niimura 13'	Attendance: 10,054; Referee: Shizuo Takada; Assistant referees: Keiichi Sunakawa, Toshiyuki Mayuzumi; Fourth official: Hideaki Ishii

19 June 1993 1st-11	Yokohama Marinos	2–0	Verdy Kawasaki	Tokyo National Stadium
19:04 JST (UTC+09)	Hirakawa 42'; Díaz 61'	J. League		Attendance: 53,376; Referee: Martin Bodenham; Assistant referees: Hiroshi Fukuda, Noboru Ishiyama; Fourth official: Kazuo Kojima

23 June 1993 1st-12	Kashima Antlers	3–2	Verdy Kawasaki	Kashima Soccer Stadium
19:06 JST (UTC+09)	Santos 5'; Alcindo 27'; Koga 80'	J. League	Nagai 64'; Takeda 74'	Attendance: 15,777; Referee: Hitoshi Yamada; Assistant referees: Masato Nogami, Kimio Izaki; Fourth official: Ichirō Inukai

26 June 1993 1st-13	Verdy Kawasaki	1–0	Urawa Red Diamonds	Kawasaki Todoroki Stadium
19:03 JST (UTC+09)	Miura 83'	J. League		Attendance: 10,078; Referee: Kiyoshi Ōta; Assistant referees: Hiroshi Fukuda, Masahiro Katagiri; Fourth official: Norio Nishiura

30 June 1993 1st-14	Verdy Kawasaki	1–1 (a.s.d.e.t.) (4–2 p)	Shimizu S-Pulse	Kawasaki Todoroki Stadium
19:02 JST (UTC+09)	Nagai 12'	J. League	48' (o.g.)	Attendance: 10,067; Referee: Fumikazu Shioyazono; Assistant referees: Naotsugu Fuse, Kimio Izaki; Fourth official: Hideaki Kobayashi
	Penalties
	(penalty scored) Hashiratani; (penalty scored) Miura; (penalty scored) Pereira; (penalty scored) Ishikawa		(penalty missed) Edu; (penalty scored) Hasegawa; (penalty missed) Ōenoki; (penalty scored) Sanada

3 July 1993 1st-15	Yokohama Flügels	0–0 (a.s.d.e.t.) (1–3 p)	Verdy Kawasaki	Nagasaki Stadium
19:05 JST (UTC+09)		J. League		Attendance: 14,552; Referee: Martin Bodenham; Assistant referees: Kiyoshi Ōta, Hideaki Harada; Fourth official: Shigehisa Yamaguchi
	Penalties
	(penalty missed) Edu; (penalty missed) Moner; (penalty missed) Iwai; (penalty scored) Maeda		(penalty scored) Hashiratani; (penalty missed) Miura; (penalty missed) Kitazawa; (penalty scored) Pereira; (penalty scored) Ishikawa

7 July 1993 1st-16	Verdy Kawasaki	5–0	Nagoya Grampus Eight	Kawasaki Todoroki Stadium
19:02 JST (UTC+09)	Kitazawa 6', 13'; Nagai 19'; Hanssen 71'; Miura 83'	J. League		Attendance: 10,225; Referee: Masayoshi Okada; Assistant referees: Yū Nakamura, Noboru Ishiyama; Fourth official: Mineo Takada

10 July 1993 1st-17	Gamba Osaka	2–3	Verdy Kawasaki	Expo '70 Commemorative Stadium
16:03 JST (UTC+09)	Nagashima 29'; Müller 71'	J. League	Takeda 16'; Kitazawa 40'; Hashiratani 85'	Attendance: 21,447; Referee: Shinichirō Obata; Assistant referees: Yasuhiro Hemmi, Toyohide Kanda; Fourth official: Tsuyoshi Miyake

14 July 1993 1st-18	Verdy Kawasaki	2–0	Sanfrecce Hiroshima	Kawasaki Todoroki Stadium
19:04 JST (UTC+09)	Takeda 35'; Hanssen 66'	J. League		Attendance: 10,100; Referee: Tatsumi Ōno; Assistant referees: Keiichi Sunakawa, Takeshi Ōkura; Fourth official: Hideo Teranishi

==== NICOS series ====
24 July 1993 2nd-1	Yokohama Marinos	3–0	Verdy Kawasaki	Yokohama Mitsuzawa Football Stadium
18:33 JST (UTC+09)	Bisconti 4'; Díaz 43', 72' (pen.)	J. League		Attendance: 14,248; Referee: Shizuo Takada; Assistant referees: Hitoshi Yamada, Yū Nakamura; Fourth official: 清美 Sasaki

31 July 1993 2nd-2	Verdy Kawasaki	2–0	Gamba Osaka	Hakatanomori Athletic Stadium
19:01 JST (UTC+09)	Takeda 53'; Miura 80'	J. League		Attendance: 27,674; Referee: Kenji Tanaka; Assistant referees: Kazuya Yanagisawa, Hideaki Harada; Fourth official: Masatoshi Shibata

4 August 1993 2nd-3	Verdy Kawasaki	2–1	Kashima Antlers	Kawasaki Todoroki Stadium
19:02 JST (UTC+09)	Miura 51'; Ramos 82'	J. League	Alcindo 39'	Attendance: 10,150; Referee: Fumikazu Shioyazono; Assistant referees: Hitoshi Yamada, Noboru Ishiyama; Fourth official: Masao Imamura

7 August 1993 2nd-4	Verdy Kawasaki	2–1	JEF United Ichihara	Sapporo Atsubetsu Stadium
12:05 JST (UTC+09)	Miura 78'; Bismarck 89'	J. League	Littbarski 36'	Attendance: 21,745; Referee: Shinichirō Obata; Assistant referees: Masayoshi Okada, Takashi Kunori; Fourth official: Eiji Kaneda

14 August 1993 2nd-5	Verdy Kawasaki	3–0	Sanfrecce Hiroshima	Kawasaki Todoroki Stadium
19:02 JST (UTC+09)	Ramos 1'; Miura 41'; Takeda 63'	J. League		Attendance: 10,195; Referee: Shizuo Takada; Assistant referees: Keiichi Sunakawa, Masato Nogami; Fourth official: Nobuhiro Shirai

19 August 1993 2nd-6	Verdy Kawasaki	3–1	Nagoya Grampus Eight	Tokyo National Stadium
19:03 JST (UTC+09)	Miura 67' (pen.); 72' (o.g.); Nakamura 89'	J. League	Ogawa 5'	Attendance: 54,977; Referee: Kōetsu Kikuchi; Assistant referees: Hiroshi Fukuda, Kimio Izaki; Fourth official: Hideaki Ishii

25 August 1993 2nd-7	Yokohama Flügels	0–1	Verdy Kawasaki	Tokyo National Stadium
19:03 JST (UTC+09)		J. League	Miura 44'	Attendance: 51,082; Referee: Kiyoshi Ōta; Assistant referees: Mitsuru Satō, Noboru Ishiyama; Fourth official: Tōru Kamikawa

28 August 1993 2nd-8	Verdy Kawasaki	0–0 (a.s.d.e.t.) (2–3 p)	Shimizu S-Pulse	Iwate Morioka Stadium
15:02 JST (UTC+09)		J. League		Attendance: 28,625; Referee: Kōetsu Kikuchi; Assistant referees: Keiichi Sunakawa, Kimio Izaki; Fourth official: Fumiaki Kikuchi
	Penalties
	(penalty missed) Miura; (penalty missed) Kitazawa; (penalty scored) Bismarck; (penalty scored) Kikuhara; (penalty missed) Ishikawa		(penalty scored) Gomes; (penalty missed) Hasegawa; (penalty scored) Sawanobori; (penalty scored) Miura

3 September 1993 2nd-9	Urawa Red Diamonds	0–6	Verdy Kawasaki	Urawa Komaba Stadium
19:03 JST (UTC+09)		J. League	Bismarck 7'; Ramos 38'; Miura 44'; Takeda 56', 88'; Y. Katō 79'	Attendance: 9,771; Referee: Masahiro Sogawa; Assistant referees: Toshiyuki Mayuzumi, Satoru Ishizawa; Fourth official: Morihiko Yamaji

6 November 1993 2nd-10	Gamba Osaka	0–4	Verdy Kawasaki	Kobe Universiade Memorial Stadium
19:03 JST (UTC+09)		J. League	Takeda 44', 76', 79'; Kitazawa 67'	Attendance: 41,054; Referee: Juan Carlos Crespi; Assistant referees: Fumikazu Shioyazono, Sōichirō Kaneko; Fourth official: Kazunori Okada

10 November 1993 2nd-11	Verdy Kawasaki	1–0 (a.s.d.e.t.)	Yokohama Marinos	Tokyo National Stadium
19:04 JST (UTC+09)	Takeda 91'	J. League		Attendance: 55,243; Referee: Fumikazu Shioyazono; Assistant referees: Keiichi Sunakawa, Kimio Izaki; Fourth official: Jōji Kashihara

13 November 1993 2nd-12	JEF United Ichihara	1–4	Verdy Kawasaki	Miyagi Athletic Stadium
13:03 JST (UTC+09)	Littbarski 23'	J. League	Bismarck 50', 59'; Pereira 75'; Nakamura 86'	Attendance: 19,524; Referee: Kiyoshi Ōta; Assistant referees: Takeshi Ōkura, Masato Nogami; Fourth official: Takayoshi Ōmi

17 November 1993 2nd-13	Sanfrecce Hiroshima	1–3	Verdy Kawasaki	Hiroshima Stadium
19:04 JST (UTC+09)	Katanosaka 61'	J. League	Miura 24', 29'; Takeda 89'	Attendance: 13,906; Referee: Hiroyuki Umemoto; Assistant referees: Kazuo Kakihana, Hiroshi Tanabe; Fourth official: Shinya Sasamoto

20 November 1993 2nd-14	Nagoya Grampus Eight	1–2	Verdy Kawasaki	Gifu Nagaragawa Stadium
19:05 JST (UTC+09)	Jorginho 35'	J. League	Bismarck 63'; Miura 85'	Attendance: 26,584; Referee: Yōtarō Moritsu; Assistant referees: Kazunori Okada, Yasuhiro Hemmi; Fourth official: Takahiko Sugiyama

27 November 1993 2nd-15	Verdy Kawasaki	3–0	Yokohama Flügels	Kawasaki Todoroki Stadium
19:04 JST (UTC+09)	Ramos 54'; Miura 74' (pen.); Bismarck 85'	J. League		Attendance: 10,299; Referee: Masahiro Sogawa; Assistant referees: Hiroshi Fukuda, Takeshi Ōkura; Fourth official: Jōji Kashihara

1 December 1993 2nd-16	Shimizu S-Pulse	0–1	Verdy Kawasaki	Tokyo National Stadium
19:04 JST (UTC+09)		J. League	Takeda 26'	Attendance: 51,825; Referee: Kōetsu Kikuchi; Assistant referees: Keiichi Sunakawa, Noboru Ishiyama; Fourth official: Takuji Fukazawa

8 December 1993 2nd-17	Verdy Kawasaki	4–0	Urawa Red Diamonds	Tokyo National Stadium
19:05 JST (UTC+09)	Miura 17', 27', 82'; Fujiyoshi 79'	J. League		Attendance: 50,310; Referee: Shizuo Takada; Assistant referees: Yū Nakamura, Mitsuru Satō; Fourth official: Kazuhiko Uchida

15 December 1993 2nd-18	Kashima Antlers	1–2	Verdy Kawasaki	Kashima Soccer Stadium
19:03 JST (UTC+09)	Alcindo 23'	J. League	Ishikawa 27'; Miura 68'	Attendance: 15,277; Referee: Juan Carlos Crespi; Assistant referees: Hiroshi Fukuda, Takashi Kunori; Fourth official: Ichirō Inukai

==== J.League Championship ====
9 January 1994 1	Kashima Antlers	0–2	Verdy Kawasaki	Tokyo National Stadium
13:05 JST (UTC+09)		J. League	Miura 60'; Bismarck 89'	Attendance: 53,553; Referee: Kenji Tanaka; Assistant referees: Morihisa Yamaguchi, Hiroyuki Umemoto; Fourth official: Shinichirō Obata

16 January 1994 2	Verdy Kawasaki	1–1 (3–1 agg.)	Kashima Antlers	Tokyo National Stadium
13:03 JST (UTC+09)	Miura 82' (pen.)	J. League	Alcindo 38'	Attendance: 53,010; Referee: Shizuo Takada; Assistant referees: Fumikazu Shioyazono, Yū Nakamura; Fourth official: Yoshimi Ogawa

=== Emperor's Cup ===
5 December 1993 1st Round	Hokuden	0–5	Verdy Kawasaki	Amagasaki Stadium
: JST (UTC+09)			Kitazawa (?); Miura (?); Bismarck (?); Pereira (?)

11 December 1993 2nd Round	Cosmo Oil	0–2	Verdy Kawasaki	Oita Athletic Stadium
: JST (UTC+09)			Kitazawa (?); Miura (?)

19 December 1993 Quarterfinals	Yokohama Flügels	2–1	Verdy Kawasaki	Hakatanomori Athletic Stadium
: JST (UTC+09)	Maezono (?); Maeda (?)		Miura (?)

=== J.League Cup ===
11 September 1993 GL-A-1	Verdy Kawasaki	1–1 (a.s.d.e.t.) (2–4 p)	Kashima Antlers	Kawasaki Todoroki Stadium
18:31 JST (UTC+09)	Bismarck 25'	J. League	Hasegawa 72'	Attendance: 10,092; Referee: Kiichirō Tachi; Assistant referees: Keiichi Sunakawa, Hiroshi Fukuda; Fourth official: Kazuhiko Uchida
	Penalties
	(penalty scored) Nagai; (penalty scored) Kikuhara; (penalty missed) Bismarck; (penalty missed) Kawamoto		(penalty scored) Santos; (penalty scored) Zico; (penalty scored) Akita; (penalty scored) Sugiyama

15 September 1993 GL-A-2	JEF United Ichihara	5–0	Verdy Kawasaki	Niigata Stadium
14:02 JST (UTC+09)	Otze 11', 13'; Nakanishi 20'; Pavel 66' (pen.), 71'	J. League		Attendance: 15,337; Referee: Shinichirō Obata; Assistant referees: Morihisa Yamaguchi, Yoshitsugu Katayama; Fourth official: Masaaki Shimomura

18 September 1993 GL-A-3	Verdy Kawasaki	5–1	Gamba Osaka	Tokyo National Stadium
18:31 JST (UTC+09)	Bismarck 15', 44'; Y. Katō 35'; Fujiyoshi 66'; Nagai 82'	J. League	Kazuaki Koezuka 31'	Attendance: 47,373; Referee: Juan Carlos Crespi; Assistant referees: Hiroshi Fukuda, Noboru Ishiyama; Fourth official: Katsunori Moriya

25 September 1993 GL-A-4	Sanfrecce Hiroshima	0–0 (a.s.d.e.t.) (1–4 p)	Verdy Kawasaki	Hiroshima Stadium
18:32 JST (UTC+09)		J. League		Attendance: 12,011; Referee: Shizuo Takada; Assistant referees: Kazunori Okada, Hiroshi Tanabe; Fourth official: Kazuhiko Matsumura
	Penalties
	(penalty scored) Matsuda; (penalty missed) Moriyama; (penalty missed) Kojima		(penalty scored) Pereira; (penalty scored) Kikuhara; (penalty scored) Nagai; (penalty scored) Sukigara

2 October 1993 GL-A-5	Verdy Kawasaki	2–0	Kashiwa Reysol	Kawasaki Todoroki Stadium
18:33 JST (UTC+09)	Bismarck 37'; Abe 55'	J. League		Attendance: 10,140; Referee: Tatsumi Ōno; Assistant referees: Noboru Ishiyama, Mitsuru Satō; Fourth official: Haruo Suzuki

9 October 1993 GL-A-6	Shonan Bellmare	2–5	Verdy Kawasaki	Hiratsuka Stadium
18:03 JST (UTC+09)	T. Iwamoto 10', 79'	J. League	Nagai 19', 65'; Fujiyoshi 62'; Totsuka 72'; Bismarck 89'	Attendance: 10,436; Referee: Tetsuya Hamana; Assistant referees: Toshiyuki Mayuzumi, Masahiro Katagiri; Fourth official: Takeshi Ōgiya

GL-A-7	bye

23 October 1993 Semifinals	Verdy Kawasaki	2–1 (a.s.d.e.t.)	Yokohama Flügels	Tokyo National Stadium
19:03 JST (UTC+09)	Fujiyoshi 41' 106'	J. League	Sorimachi 59'	Attendance: 50,633; Referee: Juan Carlos Crespi; Assistant referees: Tatsumi Ōno, Yū Nakamura; Fourth official: Naotsugu Fuse

23 November 1993 Final	Verdy Kawasaki	2–1	Shimizu S-Pulse	Tokyo National Stadium
13:03 JST (UTC+09)	Bismarck 73'; Kitazawa 85'	J. League	Ōenoki 13'	Attendance: 53,677; Referee: Juan Carlos Crespi; Assistant referees: Fumikazu Shioyazono, Kōetsu Kikuchi; Fourth official: Keiichi Sunakawa

== International results ==
=== Asian Club Championship ===
1st Round	bye

17 October 1993 2nd Round-1	(Hong Kong) Eastern	1–0	(Japan) Verdy Kawasaki	Hong Kong
	? (?)

27 October 1993 2nd Round-2	(Japan) Verdy Kawasaki	3–1 (3–2 agg.)	(Hong Kong) Eastern	Tokyo, Japan
	Fujiyoshi (?); Bismarck (?)		? (?)	Stadium: Tokyo National Stadium

== Player statistics ==
No.	Pos	Nat	Player	Total		J.League		J.League Championship		Emperor's Cup		J.League Cup		Asian Club Championship	
No.	Pos	Nat	Player	Apps	Goals	Apps	Goals	Apps	Goals	Apps	Goals	Apps	Goals	Apps	Goals
	GK	(Japan) JPN	Takayuki Fujikawa	9	0	9	0	0	0	0	0	0	0	0	0
	GK	(Japan) JPN	Yūji Keigoshi	1	0	1	0	0	0	0	0	0	0	0	0
	GK	(Japan) JPN	Shinkichi Kikuchi	42	0	28	0	2	0	3	0	8	0	1	0
	GK	(Japan) JPN	Hiroki Koike	0	0	0	0	0	0	0	0	0	0	0	0
	GK	(Japan) JPN	Manabu Konno	0	0	0	0	0	0	0	0	0	0	0	0
	DF	(Japan) JPN	Hisashi Katō	1	0	1	0	0	0	0	0	0	0	0	0
	DF	(Brazil) BRA	Pereira	45	2	32	1	2	0	3	1	7	0	1	0
	DF	(Japan) JPN	Satoshi Tsunami	5	0	5	0	0	0	0	0	0	0	0	0
	DF	(Japan) JPN	Hirokazu Sasaki	7	0	7	0	0	0	0	0	0	0	0	0
	DF	(Japan) JPN	Kō Ishikawa	34	1	22	1	2	0	2	0	7	0	1	0
	DF	(Japan) JPN	Tadashi Nakamura	45	2	34	2	1	0	2	0	7	0	1	0
	DF	(Japan) JPN	Mitsuhiro Kawamoto	21	0	13	0	1	0	2	0	4	0	1	0
	DF	(Japan) JPN	Kōichi Togashi	6	0	2	0	0	0	0	0	4	0	0	0
	DF	(Japan) JPN	Naohito Tomaru	0	0	0	0	0	0	0	0	0	0	0	0
	DF	(Japan) JPN	Tatsuya Murata	0	0	0	0	0	0	0	0	0	0	0	0
	DF	(Japan) JPN	Toshimi Kikuchi	0	0	0	0	0	0	0	0	0	0	0	0
	DF	(Japan) JPN	Shun Suzuki	0	0	0	0	0	0	0	0	0	0	0	0
	DF	(Japan) JPN	Junji Nishizawa	0	0	0	0	0	0	0	0	0	0	0	0
	MF	(Japan) JPN	Ruy Ramos	34	4	30	4	2	0	1	0	1	0	0	0
	MF	(Japan) JPN	Tetsuya Totsuka	18	2	10	1	0	0	1	0	6	1	1	0
	MF	(Japan) JPN	Tetsuji Hashiratani	36	3	31	3	2	0	2	0	1	0	0	0
	MF	(Japan) JPN	Yoshiyuki Katō	16	2	7	1	0	0	1	0	7	1	1	0
	MF	(Japan) JPN	Tsuyoshi Kitazawa	41	9	35	6	2	0	3	2	1	1	0	0
	MF	(Japan) JPN	Ryūichi Yoneyama	0	0	0	0	0	0	0	0	0	0	0	0
	MF	(Japan) JPN	Shirō Kikuhara	14	0	6	0	0	0	2	0	6	0	0	0
	MF	(Japan) JPN	Hideki Nagai	28	6	20	3	0	0	0	0	7	3	1	0
	MF	(Japan) JPN	Tomohiro Hasumi	0	0	0	0	0	0	0	0	0	0	0	0
	MF	(Japan) JPN	Junichi Watanabe	0	0	0	0	0	0	0	0	0	0	0	0
	MF	(Japan) JPN	Takayuki Yamaguchi	1	0	0	0	0	0	0	0	1	0	0	0
	MF	(Japan) JPN	Shingi Ono	0	0	0	0	0	0	0	0	0	0	0	0
	MF	(Brazil) BRA	Amoroso	0	0	0	0	0	0	0	0	0	0	0	0
	MF	(Japan) JPN	Keiji Ishizuka	1	0	0	0	0	0	0	0	1	0	0	0
	FW	(Japan) JPN	Kazuo Ozaki	2	0	2	0	0	0	0	0	0	0	0	0
	FW	(Japan) JPN	Masahiro Sukigara	4	0	0	0	0	0	0	0	3	0	1	0
	FW	(Japan) JPN	Kazuyoshi Miura	42	25	36	20	2	2	3	3	1	0	0	0
	FW	(Japan) JPN	Nobuhiro Takeda	42	17	36	17	2	0	3	0	1	0	0	0
	FW	(Japan) JPN	Shinji Fujiyoshi	17	7	6	1	0	0	2	0	8	4	1	2
	FW	(Japan) JPN	Nobuyuki Hosaka	0	0	0	0	0	0	0	0	0	0	0	0
	FW	(Japan) JPN	Haruo Hiroyama	0	0	0	0	0	0	0	0	0	0	0	0
	FW	(Brazil) BRA	Paulinho	0	0	0	0	0	0	0	0	0	0	0	0
	FW	(Japan) JPN	Kōji Seki	0	0	0	0	0	0	0	0	0	0	0	0
	FW	(Japan) JPN	Yoshinori Abe	18	1	8	0	0	0	3	0	6	1	1	0
	FW	(Japan) JPN	Tsuyoshi Yamamoto	0	0	0	0	0	0	0	0	0	0	0	0
	FW		Kim San-Jun	0	0	0	0	0	0	0	0	0	0	0	0
	DF	(Japan) JPN	Keizō Adachi †	0	0	0	0	0	0	0	0	0	0	0	0
	FW	(Netherlands) NED	Meijer †	11	2	11	2	0	0	0	0	0	0	0	0
	MF	(Netherlands) NED	Hanssen †	18	3	18	3	0	0	0	0	0	0	0	0
	DF	(Netherlands) NED	Rossum †	29	0	17	0	0	0	3	0	8	0	1	0
	MF	(Brazil) BRA	Bismarck †	30	16	17	6	2	1	3	2	7	6	1	1
	MF	(Brazil) BRA	Paulo †	2	0	0	0	2	0	0	0	0	0	0	0

- † player(s) joined the team after the opening of this season.

Note
The match data of the Asian Club Championship 2nd Round-1 (v. (Hong Kong) Eastern) is unknown.

== Transfers ==
In:

No.	Pos.	Nation	Player
—	FW	JPN	Kazuo Ozaki (from Urawa Red Diamonds)
—	GK	JPN	Yūji Keigoshi (from Gamba Osaka)
—	DF	JPN	Shun Suzuki (from Yomiuri youth)
—	DF	JPN	Junji Nishizawa (from Yomiuri youth)
—	MF	JPN	Shingi Ono (from Yomiuri youth)
—	MF	JPN	Keiji Ishizuka (from Yamashiro High School)
—	FW		Kim San-Jun (from Tokyo Korean Senior High School)

Out:

No.	Pos.	Nation	Player
—	DF	BRA	Davi
—	FW	BRA	Ferreira
—	GK	JPN	Kōji Arimoto
—	DF	JPN	Nobuyuki Arai
—	DF	JPN	Takashi Yamaguchi
—	MF	JPN	Keiji Takao
—	MF	JPN	Osamu Takada
—	FW	JPN	Osamu Shinohara
—	FW	JPN	Kazuyoshi Seki

== Transfers during the season ==
=== In ===
- (Japan) Keizō Adachi
- (Netherlands) Henny Meijer (on May)
- (Netherlands) Gène Hanssen (from Roda JC on May)
- (Netherlands) Eric van Rossum (on July)
- (Brazil) Bismarck (from Vasco da Gama on July)
- (Brazil) Paulo (from Botafogo FC on September)

=== Out ===
- (Netherlands) Henny Meijer (on July)
- (Netherlands) Gène Hanssen (on July)
- (Japan) Hisashi Katō (to Shimizu S-Pulse on July)
- (Netherlands) Eric van Rossum (on January)

== Awards ==
- J.League Most Valuable Player: (Japan) Kazuyoshi Miura
- J.League Best XI: (Brazil) Pereira, (Japan) Tetsuji Hashiratani, (Japan) Ruy Ramos, (Japan) Kazuyoshi Miura
- J.League Cup Most Valuable Player: (Brazil) Bismarck

== Other pages ==
- (in Japanese) J. League official site
- (in Japanese) Tokyo Verdy official site
