= Erik van Rossum =

Dutch footballer

Personal information
- Full name: Erik van Rossum
- Date of birth: 27 March 1963 (age 63)
- Place of birth: Netherlands
- Height: 1.90 m (6 ft 3 in)
- Position: Defender

Youth career
- NEC Nijmegen

Senior career*
| Years | Team | Apps | (Gls) |
| 1983–1987 | NEC Nijmegen | | |
| 1988 | FC Twente | | |
| 1989 | Willem II | | |
| 1989–1991 | Germinal Ekeren | | |
| 1991–1992 | Plymouth Argyle FC | | |
| 1993 | Verdy Kawasaki | | |
| 1995 | Albireo Niigata | | |
- * Club domestic league appearances and goals

Erik van Rossum (born 27 March 1963, in Nijmegen) is a former Dutch football player.

He runs a pub in Nijmegen.

== Club statistics ==
| Club performance | | | League | | Cup | | League Cup | | Total | |
| Season | Club | League | Apps | Goals | Apps | Goals | Apps | Goals | Apps | Goals |
| Japan | | | League | | Emperor's Cup | | J.League Cup | | Total | |
|---|---|---|---|---|---|---|---|---|---|---|
| 1993 | Verdy Kawasaki | J1 League | 17 | 0 | 3 | 0 | 8 | 0 | 28 | 0 |
| Total | | | 17 | 0 | 3 | 0 | 8 | 0 | 28 | 0 |
