= Hirokazu Sasaki =

Japanese footballer and manager

Hirokazu Sasaki 佐々木 博和
Personal information
- Full name: Hirokazu Sasaki
- Date of birth: February 16, 1962 (age 64)
- Place of birth: Osaka, Japan
- Height: 1.64 m (5 ft 4 1/2 in)
- Position: Midfielder

Youth career
- 1977–1979: Osaka Sangyo University High School

Senior career*
Years	Team	Apps	(Gls)
1980–1992	Matsushita Electric		
1992–1993	Verdy Kawasaki	7	(0)
1994–1995	Cerezo Osaka	31	(1)

Managerial career
- 2003: Speranza FC Takatsuki
Medal record
Matsushita Electric
Winner	Emperor's Cup	1990
Verdy Kawasaki
Winner	J1 League	1993
Winner	J.League Cup	1992
Winner	J.League Cup	1993
Runner-up	Emperor's Cup	1992
Cerezo Osaka
Runner-up	Emperor's Cup	1994
- * Club domestic league appearances and goals

Hirokazu Sasaki (佐々木 博和, Sasaki Hirokazu; born February 16, 1962) is a former Japanese football player and manager.

== Playing career ==
Sasaki was born in Osaka Prefecture on February 16, 1962, and grew up in Okayama Prefecture. After graduating from high school, he joined his local new club Matsushita Electric in 1980. He became a regular player and the club was promoted to Japan Soccer League in 1984. However his opportunity to play decreased from 1990. In 1992, Japan Soccer League was folded and founded new league J1 League and he moved to J1 League club Verdy Kawasaki. He could hardly play in the match. He returned to Osaka and joined Japan Football League club Cerezo Osaka. The club won the champions in 1994 and was promoted to J1 League. He retired end of 1995 season.

== Coaching career ==
In 2003, Sasaki became a manager for L.League club Speranza FC Takatsuki. He managed the club in 1 season.

== Club statistics ==
Club performance			League		Cup		League Cup		Total	
Season	Club	League	Apps	Goals	Apps	Goals	Apps	Goals	Apps	Goals
Japan			League		Emperor's Cup		J.League Cup		Total	
1980	Matsushita Electric	Prefectural Leagues								
1981	Matsushita Electric	Prefectural Leagues								
1982	Matsushita Electric	Prefectural Leagues								
1983	Matsushita Electric	Regional Leagues								
1984	Matsushita Electric	JSL Division 2								
1985/86	Matsushita Electric	JSL Division 2								
1986/87	Matsushita Electric	JSL Division 1	20	0						
1987/88	Matsushita Electric	JSL Division 2								
1988/89	Matsushita Electric	JSL Division 1	22	0			1	0	23	0
1989/90	Matsushita Electric	JSL Division 1	21	0			1	0	22	0
1990/91	Matsushita Electric	JSL Division 1	15	0			1	0	16	0
1991/92	Matsushita Electric	JSL Division 1	10	0			0	0	10	0
1992	Verdy Kawasaki	J1 League	-		2	0	0	0	2	0
1993	Verdy Kawasaki	J1 League	7	0	0	0	0	0	7	0
1994	Cerezo Osaka	Football League	19	1	3	0	1	0	23	1
1995	Cerezo Osaka	J1 League	12	0	0	0	-		12	0
Total			126	1	5	0	4	0	135	1
