= Davi (footballer, born 1963) =

Brazilian footballer

Personal information
- Full name: David Cortes da Silva
- Date of birth: November 19, 1963 (age 62)
- Place of birth: Rio de Janeiro, Brazil
- Height: 1.81 m (5 ft 11 1/2 in)
- Position: Defender

Senior career*
Years	Team	Apps	(Gls)
1982–1989	Santos FC		
1992	Verdy Kawasaki		
1992–1993	América-SP		
1994–1995	Guarani FC		
1996–1997	São José EC		
- * Club domestic league appearances and goals

David Cortes da Silva, or Davi (born 19 November 1963) is a Brazilian former footballer who played as a defender.

== Club career ==
Davi played for Verdy Kawasaki in 1992. He played many matches at J.League Cup and the club won the champions.

== National team career ==
In 1984, he was selected Brazil national team for 1984 Summer Olympics. At this tournament, Brazil won the silver medal.

== Club statistics ==
Club performance			League		Cup		League Cup		Total	
Season	Club	League	Apps	Goals	Apps	Goals	Apps	Goals	Apps	Goals
Japan			League		Emperor's Cup		J.League Cup		Total	
1992	Verdy Kawasaki	J1 League	-				8	0	8	0
Total			0	0	0	0	8	0	8	0
