= Paulinho (footballer, born 1971) =

Brazilian footballer

Personal information
- Full name: Paulo Cesar Bonfim
- Date of birth: 15 July 1971 (age 55)
- Place of birth: Brazil
- Height: 1.64 m (5 ft 5 in)
- Position: Forward

Senior career*
Years	Team	Apps	(Gls)
1992–1993	Verdy Kawasaki		
- * Club domestic league appearances and goals

Paulo Cesar Bonfim (born 15 July 1971) is a Brazilian former footballer who played as a forward.

== Playing career ==
Paulinho joined Japanese J1 League club Verdy Kawasaki in 1992. However he could not play many matches behind Japan international player, Kazuyoshi Miura and Nobuhiro Takeda. Paulinho played 2 matches in 1992 J.League Cup. He could not play at all in the match in 1993 and left the club end of 1993 season.

== Club statistics ==
Club	Season	League			Emperor's Cup		J.League Cup		Total	
Club	Season	Division	Apps	Goals	Apps	Goals	Apps	Goals	Apps	Goals
Verdy Kawasaki	1992	J1 League	-				2	0	2	0
Verdy Kawasaki	1993	J1 League	0	0			0	0	0	0
Total			0	0	0	0	2	0	2	0
