= Pereira (footballer, born 1960) =

Brazilian footballer

Personal information
- Full name: Luiz Carlos Pereira
- Date of birth: 6 March 1960 (age 66)
- Place of birth: Timburi, São Paulo, Brazil
- Height: 1.84 m (6 ft 0 in)
- Position: Defender

Youth career
- Platinense

Senior career*
Years	Team	Apps	(Gls)
1979–1980	Platinense		
1981–1985	Ituano		
1985	→ São Bento (loan)		
1986–1988	Bahia	46	(2)
1989–1992	Guarani	92	(9)
1992–1995	Verdy Kawasaki	125	(9)
1996–1998	Consadole Sapporo	61	(8)
Total		324	(28)
- * Club domestic league appearances and goals

Luiz Carlos Pereira (born 6 March 1960 in São Paulo), nicknamed "The Spanish Goose", is a retired Brazilian footballer who played as a defender.

== Career ==
Born in Timburi in the Brazilian state of São Paulo, Pereira began his career with Platinense of Santo Antônio da Platina in Paraná. In 1981 he joined Ituano, as Platinense could no longer afford to pay his wages after two years with them. Competing in the Campeonato Paulista Série A2, the team would train at night due to work commitments of the squad, with Pereira finding himself staying near the Estádio Álvaro de Souza Lima, where they trained.

Ituano's squad grew in strength in 1983, and the club narrowly missed out on promotion to the Campeonato Paulista in 1984. The following year, Pereira was loaned to São Bento, and would have reportedly signed on a permanent basis, were it not for the high fee demanded by Ituano. Instead, he drew the attention of Série A club Bahia, with whom he signed a contract ahead of the 1986 season.

Initially a midfielder in his early career, Pereira was converted into a defender at Bahia, due to the club's lack of depth in that area at the time. He helped the club to three Campeonato Baiano titles, as well as reaching the final of the 1988 Campeonato Brasileiro Série A, being named in the Bola de Prata (Silver Ball) squad, an honour given by Placar magazine. Despite this, he was unable to compete in the final matches of the tournament, as his contract expired before the games were played in February 1989.

Without a club, Pereira joined Guarani, where his performances in the 1991 Série B helped the club return to Brazil's top flight. His performances drew the attention of clubs in Japan, where football had begun to establish a foothold on the national sports scene, following the founding of the J.League in November 1991. Having initially rejected bids from Japanese clubs for Pereira, former Brazilian international footballer Pepe spoke with Guarani club president Beto Zini, convincing him to allow Pereira to join Verdy Kawasaki; the club Pepe was managing at the time.

Having featured for Verdy at the end of the 1992 season, he helped the club to the inaugural 1993 J.League title the following year, repeating this success the following year. He adapted well to life in Japan, and was named J.League Most Valuable Player in 1994. After three full seasons with Verdy, he joined newly-formed club Consadole Sapporo ahead of the 1996 season alongside compatriot and teammate at Verdy, Alcindo Sartori. A fifth place finish in the 1996 Japan Football League was followed by promotion to the J.League after finishing as champions of the 1997 Japan Football League. After one more season in the J.League, Pereira retired in 1998, following surgery for a knee injury.

== Personal life ==
Pereira's son, Leonardo Mantovani Pereira, is a youth football coach, and having worked for Ituano between 2020 and 2023, he joined São Paulo in 2024, taking charge of the under-11 and under-12 teams – a position he held for a year, leaving in July 2025.

== Club statistics ==
Appearances and goals by club, season and competition
Club	Season	League			State League		National Cup (Note: Includes Copa do Brasil and Emperor's Cup)		League Cup (Note: Includes J.League Cup)		Total	
Club	Season	Division	Apps	Goals	Apps	Goals	Apps	Goals	Apps	Goals	Apps	Goals
Bahia	1986	Série A	11	0	0	0	0	0	0	0	11	0
Bahia	1987	Série A	12	0	0	0	0	0	0	0	12	0
Bahia	1988	Série A	23	2	0	0	0	0	0	0	23	2
Bahia	Total		46	2	0	0	0	0	0	0	46	2
Guarani	1989	Série B	18	1	0	0	4	0	0	0	22	1
Guarani	1990	Série B	0	0	43 (Note: Appearances in the Campeonato Paulista)	5	0	0	0	0	43	5
Guarani	1991	Série B	1	0	12	1	0	0	0	0	13	1
Guarani	1992	Série A	18	2	0	0	0	0	0	0	18	2
Guarani	Total		37	3	55	6	4	0	0	0	96	9
Verdy Kawasaki	1992	–					5	1	11	1	16	2
Verdy Kawasaki	1993	J1 League	32	1	–		3	1	7	0	42	2
Verdy Kawasaki	1994	J1 League	43	2	–		2	0	3	0	48	2
Verdy Kawasaki	1995	J1 League	50	6	–		3	0	–		53	6
Verdy Kawasaki	Total		125	9	0	0	13	2	21	1	159	12
Consadole Sapporo	1996	Football League	23	7	–		3	0	–		30	7
Consadole Sapporo	1997	Football League	27	1	–		3	2	5	0	35	3
Consadole Sapporo	1998	J1 League	11	0	–		0	0	3	0	14	0
Consadole Sapporo	Total		61	8	0	0	6	2	8	0	75	10
Career total			269	22	55	6	23	4	29	1	376	33

== Honours ==
=== Individual Honors ===
- J. League Most Valuable Player: 1994
- J. League Best Eleven: 1993, 1994
- Japanese Footballer of the Year: 1994

=== Team Honors ===
- Campeonato Baiano: 1986, 1987, 1988
- J1 League: 1993, 1994
- J League Cup: 1993, 1994
- Japanese Super Cup: 1994
