= 1991 JSL Cup =

Tournament details
- Country: Japan

Final positions
- Champions: Yomiuri
- Runners-up: Honda
- Semifinalists: Nissan Motors; Mazda

Statistics of JSL Cup in the 1991 season.

== Overview ==
It was contested by 28 teams, and Yomiuri won the championship.

== Results ==
=== 1st round ===
- Tanabe Pharmaceuticals 2-1 Cosmo Oil
- Toshiba 2-0 Otsuka Pharmaceutical
- Hitachi 8-0 Toho Titanium
- NKK 1-0 Kyoto Shiko
- Matsushita Electric 1-0 Tokyo Gas
- Toyota Motors 3-0 Yomiuri Juniors
- Yomiuri 6-0 Chuo Bohan
- Mitsubishi Motors 2-4 Sumitomo Metals
- Yamaha Motors 1-3 Fujitsu
- Mazda 3-2 NTT Kanto
- Yanmar Diesel 1-4 Kofu
- Fujita Industries 2-0 Kawasaki Steel

=== 2nd round ===
- Honda 7-1 Tanabe Pharmaceuticals
- Toshiba 1-1 (PK 4–5) Hitachi
- NKK 1-2 Matsushita Electric
- Toyota Motors 3-3 (PK 4–5) Nissan Motors
- All Nippon Airways 1-3 Yomiuri
- Sumitomo Metals 0-3 Fujitsu
- Mazda 3-1 Kofu
- Fujita Industries 1-0 Furukawa Electric

=== Quarterfinals ===
- Honda 2-2 (PK 6–5) Hitachi
- Matsushita Electric 0-1 Nissan Motors
- Yomiuri 4-1 Fujitsu
- Mazda 1-1 (PK 4–2) Fujita Industries

=== Semifinals ===
- Honda 0-0 (PK 4–2) Nissan Motors
- Yomiuri 1-0 Mazda

=== Final ===
- Honda 3-4 Yomiuri

Yomiuri won the championship
