= 1992 Emperor's Cup =

Tournament details
- Country: Japan

Final positions
- Champions: Yokohama Marinos
- Runners-up: Verdy Kawasaki
- Semifinalists: Urawa Red Diamonds; Fujita Industries

Statistics of Emperor's Cup in the 1992 season.

== Overview ==
It was contested by 32 teams, and Yokohama Marinos won the championship.

This was the first edition featuring the rebranded top-flight clubs for the emerging J. League.

== Results ==
=== First round ===
- Verdy Kawasaki 2–0 Fukuoka University
- Yamaha Motors 4–0 Toho Titanium SC
- Sanfrecce Hiroshima 2–0 Doshisha University
- Mitsubishi Motors Mizushima 0–5 Gamba Osaka
- Urawa Red Diamonds 2–1 Anfini Sapporo
- YKK 0–4 Fujitsu
- NKK 2–3 Yanmar Diesel
- Nippon Steel Yawata 1–8 Kashima Antlers
- Nagoya Grampus Eight 1–3 Fujita Industries
- Honda 1–0 NEC Yamagata
- Keio University 3–2 Kyoto Shiko
- Otsuka Pharmaceutical 0–3 JEF United Ichihara
- Yokohama Marinos 8–0 Kanazawa Club
- Osaka University of Commerce 3–4 Yokohama Flügels
- Toshiba 5–6 Chuo Bohan
- Kawasaki Steel 0–3 Shimizu S-Pulse

=== Second round ===
- Verdy Kawasaki 1–0 Yamaha Motors
- Sanfrecce Hiroshima 2–3 Gamba Osaka
- Urawa Red Diamonds 3–0 Fujitsu
- Yanmar Diesel 1–2 Kashima Antlers
- Fujita Industries 3–1 Honda
- Keio University 0–1 JEF United Ichihara
- Yokohama Marinos 4–2 Yokohama Flügels
- Chuo Bohan 1–4 Shimizu S-Pulse

=== Quarter-finals ===
- Verdy Kawasaki 1–1 (PK 4–2) Gamba Osaka
- Urawa Red Diamonds 2–1 Kashima Antlers
- Fujita Industries 1–0 JEF United Ichihara
- Yokohama Marinos 4–3 Shimizu S-Pulse

=== Semi-finals ===
- Verdy Kawasaki 2–2 (PK 4–3) Urawa Red Diamonds
- Fujita Industries 0–1 Yokohama Marinos

=== Final ===
- Verdy Kawasaki 1–2 Yokohama Marinos

Yokohama Marinos won the championship.
