= 1992 J.League Cup =

J.League Yamazaki Nabisco Cup

Tournament details
- Country: Japan
- Dates: 5 September and 23 November 1992
- Teams: 10

Final positions
- Champions: Verdy Kawasaki (1st title)
- Runners-up: Shimizu S-Pulse
- Semifinalists: Kashima Antlers; Nagoya Grampus Eight

Tournament statistics
- Matches played: 48
- Goals scored: 151 (3.15 per match)

Awards
- MVP Award: Kazuyoshi Miura (Verdy Kawasaki)

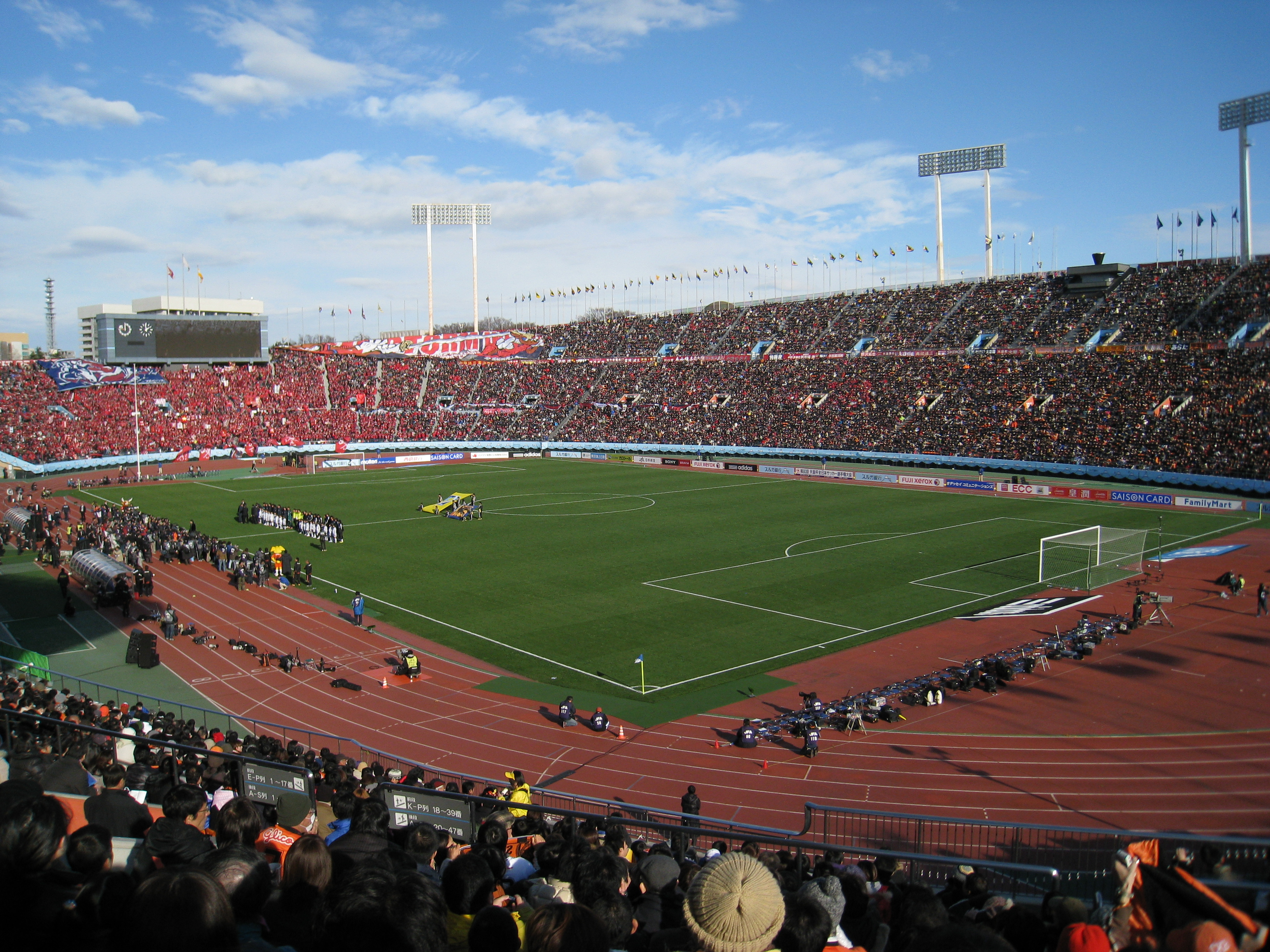

The J. League Cup 1992, officially the '92 J.League Yamazaki Nabisco Cup, was the 18th edition of Japan soccer league cup tournament and the first edition under the current J. League Cup format. The championship started on September 5 and finished on November 23, 1992.

== Round robin ==
Team	Pld	W	L	GF	GA	GD	Pts
Verdy Kawasaki	9	6	3	18	11	+7	29
Shimizu S-Pulse	9	5	4	16	12	+4	27
Nagoya Grampus Eight	9	6	3	14	10	+4	27
Kashima Antlers	9	4	5	25	20	+5	25
Urawa Reds	9	5	4	15	16	−1	25
JEF Ichihara	9	5	4	8	7	+1	22
Yokohama Marinos	9	5	4	14	14	0	22
Gamba Osaka	9	4	5	13	18	−5	21
Sanfrecce Hiroshima	9	3	6	15	18	−3	18
Yokohama Flügels	9	2	7	10	22	−12	10

== Knockout phase ==
Semifinals; October 16
1	Verdy Kawasaki	1
4	Kashima Antlers	0
2	Shimizu S-Pulse	1
3	Nagoya Grampus	0

Final; November 23
1	Verdy Kawasaki	1
2	Shimizu S-Pulse	0

=== Semifinals ===
16 October 1992
19:04

Verdy Kawasaki	1–0	Kashima Antlers
Miura 64'	Report

National Stadium, Tokyo
Attendance: 39,390
Referee: Hideo Kikuchi

16 October 1992
19:00

Shimizu S-Pulse	1–0	Nagoya Grampus Eight
Naito 9'	Report

Kusanagi Athletic Stadium, Shizuoka
Attendance: 13,391
Referee: Shinichiro Obata

=== Final ===
23 November 1992
14:00

Verdy Kawasaki	1–0	Shimizu S-Pulse
Miura 57'	Report

National Stadium, Tokyo
Attendance: 56,000
Referee: Masahiro Sogawa
