= 1995 Shimizu S-Pulse season =

Shimizu S-Pulse
1995 season
- Manager: Masakatsu Miyamoto
- Stadium: Nihondaira Sports Stadium
- J.League: 9th
- Emperor's Cup: 1st Round
- Top goalscorer: League: Dias (17); All: Dias (17)
- Highest home attendance: 21,047 (vs Yokohama Marinos, 19 July 1995); 43,502 (vs Verdy Kawasaki, 9 September 1995, Tokyo National Stadium)
- Lowest home attendance: 14,340 (vs Cerezo Osaka, 27 September 1995); 12,611 (vs JEF United Ichihara, 21 October 1995, Ishikawa Kanazawa Stadium)
- Average home league attendance: 19,747
| Home colours | Away colours |

The 1995 season was Shimizu S-Pulse's fourth season in existence and their third season in the J1 League. The club also competed in the Emperor's Cup. The team finished the season ninth in the league.

== Review and events ==
=== League results summary ===
| Overall | | | | | | | | Home | | | | | | Away | | | | | |
| Pld | W | D | L | GF | GA | GD | Pts | W | D | L | GF | GA | GD | W | D | L | GF | GA | GD |
|---|---|---|---|---|---|---|---|---|---|---|---|---|---|---|---|---|---|---|---|
| 52 | 25 | 0 | 27 | 77 | 97 | −20 | 75 | 12 | 0 | 14 | 37 | 44 | −7 | 13 | 0 | 13 | 40 | 53 | −13 |

Source: J.LEAGUE OFFICIAL RECORD & DATA 1996. ISBN 4-09-102323-1.

=== League results by round ===
J.League Suntory series (first stage)
| Round | 1 | 2 | 3 | 4 | 5 | 6 | 7 | 8 | 9 | 10 | 11 | 12 | 13 | 14 | 15 | 16 | 17 | 18 | 19 | 20 | 21 | 22 | 23 | 24 | 25 | 26 |
|---|---|---|---|---|---|---|---|---|---|---|---|---|---|---|---|---|---|---|---|---|---|---|---|---|---|---|
| Ground | H | A | H | H | A | A | H | H | A | H | A | H | A | H | A | A | H | H | A | A | H | A | H | A | H | A |
| Result | W | L | L | W | W | L | L | L | L | L | W | L | L | W | W | W | L | W | L | W | L | L | L | L | W | L |
| Position | 3 | 10 | 12 | 9 | 7 | 10 | 11 | 12 | 12 | 13 | 10 | 13 | 14 | 11 | 10 | 10 | 12 | 12 | 13 | 11 | 11 | 11 | 12 | 12 | 12 | 12 |

Source: J.LEAGUE OFFICIAL RECORD & DATA 1996. ISBN 4-09-102323-1.
A = Away; H = Home; W = Win; D = Draw; L = Loss

J.League NICOS series (second stage)
| Round | 1 | 2 | 3 | 4 | 5 | 6 | 7 | 8 | 9 | 10 | 11 | 12 | 13 | 14 | 15 | 16 | 17 | 18 | 19 | 20 | 21 | 22 | 23 | 24 | 25 | 26 |
|---|---|---|---|---|---|---|---|---|---|---|---|---|---|---|---|---|---|---|---|---|---|---|---|---|---|---|
| Ground | H | A | H | A | H | A | H | H | A | A | H | H | A | H | A | H | A | H | A | A | H | H | A | A | H | A |
| Result | L | W | W | W | L | W | W | W | W | W | L | W | W | W | W | W | L | L | L | L | W | L | L | L | L | W |
| Position | 10 | 8 | 5 | 3 | 6 | 5 | 5 | 4 | 2 | 2 | 3 | 3 | 2 | 2 | 2 | 2 | 2 | 2 | 3 | 3 | 3 | 4 | 4 | 5 | 5 | 4 |

Source: J.LEAGUE OFFICIAL RECORD & DATA 1996. ISBN 4-09-102323-1.
A = Away; H = Home; W = Win; D = Draw; L = Loss

== Competitions ==
| Competitions | Position |
|---|---|
| J.League | 9th / 14 clubs |
| Emperor's Cup | 1st round |

== Domestic results ==
=== J.League ===
| 18 March 1995 1st-1 | Shimizu S-Pulse | 3–2 (V-goal) (a.e.t.) | Kashiwa Reysol | Kusanagi Athletic Stadium |
| 15:03 JST (UTC+09) | Miura (yellow card) 5'; Toninho 37'; Hasegawa 67'; Dias 100' | J. League | Ōkura 24'; Urakami 29' (o.g.); Watanabe (yellow card) 43' | Attendance: 18,017; Referee: Yōtarō Moritsu; Assistant referees: Naoyuki Mori, Mikio Fukuoka; Fourth official: Naoki Uchiyama; Man of the Match: Toninho |

| 22 March 1995 1st-2 | Sanfrecce Hiroshima | 5–0 | Shimizu S-Pulse | Hiroshima Stadium |
| 19:01 JST (UTC+09) | Fue 7', 30'; Mori 10'; Huistra 28' (pen.); Moriyasu (yellow card) 36'; Hašek (yellow card) 58', (goal) 87' | J. League | Naitō (yellow card) 12'; Urakami (red card) 26' | Attendance: 7,421; Referee: Armando Perez; Assistant referees: Tōru Yamashiro, Yasuhiro Matsuzaki; Fourth official: Kazuhiko Matsumura |

| 25 March 1995 1st-3 | Shimizu S-Pulse | 0–1 | Cerezo Osaka | Kusanagi Athletic Stadium |
| 16:02 JST (UTC+09) | Ronaldão (yellow card) 44' | J. League | Kanda (yellow card) 29'; Kawamae (yellow card) 35'; Morishima 68'; Murata (yellow card) 64' | Attendance: 16,308; Referee: Keiichi Sunakawa; Assistant referees: Kimio Izaki, Akihisa Makino; Fourth official: Masakazu Hōjō |

| 29 March 1995 1st-4 | Shimizu S-Pulse | 4–2 | Kashima Antlers | Nihondaira Sports Stadium |
| 19:02 JST (UTC+09) | Dias 8', 79', (yellow card) 79'; Toninho 10', 44' | J. League | Jorginho 31', 38'; Santos (yellow card) 64'; Kurosaki (yellow card) 84' | Attendance: 18,118; Referee: Masayoshi Okada; Assistant referees: Satoru Kawano, Tōru Kamikawa; Fourth official: Toshiyuki Asanuma; Man of the Match: Dias |

| 1 April 1995 1st-5 | Verdy Kawasaki | 0–1 | Shimizu S-Pulse | Tokyo National Stadium |
| 15:03 JST (UTC+09) | Tsunami (yellow card) 11'; Embu (yellow card) 74' | J. League | Dias 24', (yellow card) 74'; Ota (yellow card) 64' | Attendance: 50.820; Referee: Naotsugu Fuse; Assistant referees: Toshiyuki Mayuzumi, Kenichi Koshiyama; Fourth official: Kōsei Gōukon; Man of the Match: Takumi Horiike |

| 5 April 1995 1st-6 | JEF United Ichihara | 3–1 | Shimizu S-Pulse | Ichihara Stadium |
| 19:04 JST (UTC+09) | Rufer 26'; Ejiri 54'; Jō 87' | J. League | Ōenoki (yellow card) 23'; Sidmar (yellow card) 30'; Toninho 61' | Attendance: 13,228; Referee: Armando Perez; Assistant referees: Hiroshi Fukuda, Hitoshi Yamada; Fourth official: Eita Horikawa |

| 8 April 1995 1st-7 | Shimizu S-Pulse | 2–3 | Yokohama Flügels | Nihondaira Sports Stadium |
| 15:04 JST (UTC+09) | Toninho (yellow card) 64', (goal) 71', 75'; Dias (yellow card) 78' | J. League | Maeda 38', 51'; Yamaguchi (yellow card) 44'; César Sampaio (yellow card) 53'; Maezono 54', (yellow card) 57' | Attendance: 18,409; Referee: Juan Carlos Crespi; Assistant referees: Morihisa Yamaguchi, Kōji Taniuchi; Fourth official: Masakazu Hōjō |

| 12 April 1995 1st-8 | Shimizu S-Pulse | 1–3 | Gamba Osaka | Nihondaira Sports Stadium |
| 19:00 JST (UTC+09) | Yoshida 89' | J. League | Tsveiba (yellow card) 2'; Aleinikov 45', 73'; Hashimoto (yellow card) 49'; Gillhaus (yellow card) 51', (goal) 57' | Attendance: 18,036; Referee: Kenji Tanaka; Assistant referees: Yasuhiro Hemmi, Yoshikazu Hiroshima; Fourth official: Toshiyuki Asanuma |

| 15 April 1995 1st-9 | Nagoya Grampus Eight | 2–0 | Shimizu S-Pulse | Nagoya Mizuho Athletics Stadium |
| 15:05 JST (UTC+09) | Mori 3'; Passi (yellow card) 26'; Stojković (yellow card) 79', (goal) 80' | J. League | Hiraoka (yellow card) 2'; Ota (yellow card) 33'; Ōenoki (yellow card) 86' | Attendance: 20,548; Referee: Armando Perez; Assistant referees: Noboru Ishiyama, Yasushi Tsuchimoto; Fourth official: Naoto Kuwahara |

| 22 April 1995 1st-10 | Shimizu S-Pulse | 2–3 (V-goal) (a.e.t.) | Júbilo Iwata | Nihondaira Sports Stadium |
| 16:04 JST (UTC+09) | Ōenoki (yellow card) 13'; Asakura (red card) 30'; Toninho (yellow card) 32', (goal) 76'; Sidmar (yellow card) 37'; Sawanobori 86'; Y. Itō (yellow card) 88' | J. League | Schillaci 30' (pen.) 116'; Ōishi 37', (yellow card) 64'; Fujita (yellow card) 80' | Attendance: 18,432; Referee: Juan Carlos Crespi; Assistant referees: Kazuya Yanagisawa, Satoru Kawano; Fourth official: Masakazu Hōjō |

| 26 April 1995 1st-11 | Urawa Red Diamonds | 2–3 | Shimizu S-Pulse | Omiya Football Stadium |
| 19:04 JST (UTC+09) | Dias 85'; Mizuuchi 45'; Fukuda 75' (pen.) | J. League | Sawanobori 26'; Shirai (yellow card) 32'; Naitō (yellow card) 42'; Dias (yellow card) 62' (yellow-red card) 89', (goal) 85'; Toninho 64' | Attendance: 9,739; Referee: Tetsuya Hamana; Assistant referees: Hitoshi Yamada, Mitsuru Satō; Fourth official: Noboru Shioi; Man of the Match: Sidmar |

| 29 April 1995 1st-12 | Shimizu S-Pulse | 1–4 | Bellmare Hiratsuka | Nihondaira Sports Stadium |
| 15:03 JST (UTC+09) | Nagashima 46'; Naitō (yellow card) 89' | J. League | Edson 28'; Tasaka 39'; H. Iwamoto (yellow card) 62'; T. Iwamoto (yellow card) 71'; Betinho 80'; Almir 88' | Attendance: 18,322; Referee: Yoshimi Ogawa; Assistant referees: Mikio Fukuoka, Tetsu Karakida; Fourth official: Toshiyuki Asanuma |

| 3 May 1995 1st-13 | Yokohama Marinos | 2–0 | Shimizu S-Pulse | Yokohama Mitsuzawa Football Stadium |
| 15:03 JST (UTC+09) | Ihara 21'; Bisconti 51' | J. League | | Attendance: 13,897; Referee: Shinichirō Obata; Assistant referees: Yasuhiro Matsuzaki, Sōichirō Kaneko; Fourth official: Sakae Ikeda |

| 6 May 1995 1st-14 | Shimizu S-Pulse | 1–0 | Sanfrecce Hiroshima | Nihondaira Sports Stadium |
| 16:05 JST (UTC+09) | Miura 35', 72'; Ōenoki (yellow card) 59' | J. League | Ōnishi (yellow card) 68'; Uemura (yellow card) 89' | Attendance: 18,511; Referee: Yōtarō Moritsu; Assistant referees: Naoyuki Mori, Kazuhisa Osada; Fourth official: Naoki Uchiyama; Man of the Match: Ronaldo |

| 10 May 1995 1st-15 | Cerezo Osaka | 1–1 (V-goal) (a.e.t.) (2–3 p) | Shimizu S-Pulse | Osaka Nagai No.2 Stadium |
| 19:03 JST (UTC+09) | Valdés 47'; Inagaki (yellow card) 86' | J. League | Tajima 59', (yellow card) 77'; Mukojima (yellow card) 61' (yellow-red card) 110'; Nagashima (yellow card) 102' | Attendance: 11,497; Referee: Hiroyuki Umemoto; Assistant referees: Yoshikazu Hiroshima, Yasuhiro Hemmi; Fourth official: Sōichirō Kaneko; Man of the Match: Sidmar |
| | Penalties |
| | (penalty missed) Marquinhos; (penalty scored) Kanda; (penalty missed) Yamahashi; (penalty scored) Minamoto; (penalty missed) Murata; (penalty missed) Kajino | | (penalty missed) Toninho; (penalty scored) Yoshida; (penalty scored) Ōenoki; (penalty missed) Ronaldo; (penalty missed) Nagashima; (penalty scored) Aoshima |

| 13 May 1995 1st-16 | Kashima Antlers | 0–1 | Shimizu S-Pulse | Kashima Soccer Stadium |
| 16:05 JST (UTC+09) | Masuda (yellow card) 89' | J. League | Dias 22', (yellow card) 45'; Miura (yellow card) 67'; Y. Itō (yellow card) 72' | Attendance: 15,813; Referee: Naotsugu Fuse; Assistant referees: Takeshi Ōkura, Takayoshi Kashino; Fourth official: Michio Horie; Man of the Match: Dias |

| 17 June 1995 1st-17 | Shimizu S-Pulse | 0–4 | Verdy Kawasaki | Nihondaira Sports Stadium |
| 19:04 JST (UTC+09) | Dias (yellow card) 53' | J. League | Hashiratani 3'; Takeda 10'; Alcindo 54'; Pereira 84' | Attendance: 18,776; Referee: Tetsuya Hamana; Assistant referees: Yoshikazu Hiroshima, Naoyuki Mori; Fourth official: Naoki Uchiyama |

| 21 June 1995 1st-18 | Shimizu S-Pulse | 1–1 (V-goal) (a.e.t.) (6–5 p) | JEF United Ichihara | Nihondaira Sports Stadium |
| 19:03 JST (UTC+09) | Y. Itō (yellow card) 56'; Hasegawa 69'; Ōenoki (yellow card) 101' | J. League | Ejiri 75'; Echigo (yellow card) 77' | Attendance: 18,545; Referee: Kenji Tanaka; Assistant referees: Kazuya Yanagisawa, Mitsuyoshi Nakaguma; Fourth official: Toshiyuki Asanuma; Man of the Match: Kenta Hasegawa |
| | Penalties |
| | (penalty scored) Dias; (penalty missed) Ōenoki; (penalty scored) Miura; (penalty scored) Tajima; (penalty missed) T. Itō; (penalty scored) Horiike; (penalty scored) Toninho; (penalty scored) Hasegawa | | (penalty missed) Maslovar; (penalty missed) Manaka; (penalty scored) Echigo; (penalty scored) Chano; (penalty scored) Ejiri; (penalty scored) M. Miyazawa; (penalty scored) Nakanishi; (penalty missed) Niimura |

| 24 June 1995 1st-19 | Yokohama Flügels | 6–1 | Shimizu S-Pulse | Yokohama Mitsuzawa Football Stadium |
| 19:03 JST (UTC+09) | Maeda 26', 55'; Rodrigo 33', 70', (yellow card) 34'; Yamaguchi 44'; Evair 73' | J. League | Dias 69' | Attendance: 13,789; Referee: Yōtarō Moritsu; Assistant referees: Hitoshi Yamada, Kō Ōishi; Fourth official: Ryū Tetsusashi |

| 28 June 1995 1st-20 | Gamba Osaka | 4–5 (V-goal) (a.e.t.) | Shimizu S-Pulse | Expo '70 Commemorative Stadium |
| 19:00 JST (UTC+09) | Protassov 16', 58', 89'; Kitamura (yellow card) 29'; Morioka 44'; Tsveiba (yellow card) 83' (yellow-red card) 103'; Alejnikov (yellow card) 107' | J. League | Toninho 37', 108' (pen.); Dias 55', 57'; T. Itō (yellow card) 62'; Miura (yellow card) 72', (goal) 76'; Ōenoki (yellow card) 97' | Attendance: 15,752; Referee: Armando Perez; Assistant referees: Kazuaki Hamaguchi, Morihisa Yamaguchi; Fourth official: Kazuo Kakihana; Man of the Match: Yasutoshi Miura |

| 1 July 1995 1st-21 | Shimizu S-Pulse | 1–2 | Nagoya Grampus Eight | Nihondaira Sports Stadium |
| 19:01 JST (UTC+09) | Yoshida (yellow card) 26'; Naitō (yellow card) 32'; Toninho 54' | J. League | Yonekura (yellow card) 15'; Torres 53'; Hirano 80' | Attendance: 18,917; Referee: Kiyoshi Ōta; Assistant referees: Kimio Izaki, Toshimitsu Yoshida; Fourth official: Naoki Uchiyama |

| 8 July 1995 1st-22 | Júbilo Iwata | 2–1 | Shimizu S-Pulse | Júbilo Iwata Stadium |
| 19:01 JST (UTC+09) | André Paus (yellow card) 16'; Nakayama (yellow card) 25'; Schillaci 46', 83' | J. League | Miura (yellow card) 6'; Dias 49' | Attendance: 19,069; Referee: Yoshimi Ogawa; Assistant referees: Hiroshi Fukuda, Naoyuki Mori; Fourth official: Toshiaki Futamata |

| 12 July 1995 1st-23 | Shimizu S-Pulse | 2–3 (V-goal) (a.e.t.) | Urawa Red Diamonds | Nihondaira Sports Stadium |
| 19:02 JST (UTC+09) | Sawanobori 13', 59' (pen.); Miura (yellow card) 84'; Nagahashi (yellow card) 89' | J. League | Taguchi 34'; Fukunaga 44'; Tsuchihashi (yellow card) 50'; Fukuda (yellow card) 52', 111'; Cho Ki-je (yellow card) 58' | Attendance: 18,643; Referee: Juan Carlos Crespi; Assistant referees: Kazuya Yanagisawa, Yoshikazu Hiroshima; Fourth official: Toshiyuki Asanuma |

| 15 July 1995 1st-24 | Bellmare Hiratsuka | 4–0 | Shimizu S-Pulse | Hiratsuka Stadium |
| 18:33 JST (UTC+09) | Noguchi 4', 25'; Betinho 5'; Kumon (yellow card) 22'; Nakata 45' | J. League | | Attendance: 15,449; Referee: Hideo Kikuchi; Assistant referees: Kōji Taniuchi, Hisaharu Kitamura; Fourth official: Akio Koizumi |

| 19 July 1995 1st-25 | Shimizu S-Pulse | 2–1 | Yokohama Marinos | Nihondaira Sports Stadium |
| 19:06 JST (UTC+09) | Mukōjima 3'; Sawanobori 23'; Toninho (yellow card) 55'; Naitō (yellow card) 89' | J. League | Omura 84' | Attendance: 21,047; Referee: Tatsumi Ōno; Assistant referees: Yasuhiro Hemmi, Yasushi Tsuchimoto; Fourth official: Masakazu Hōjō; Man of the Match: Katsumi Ōenoki |

| 22 July 1995 1st-26 | Kashiwa Reysol | 3–1 | Shimizu S-Pulse | Kashiwa Hitachi Stadium |
| 19:00 JST (UTC+09) | Nelsinho 29'; Careca 46'; Valdir (yellow card) 50'; Sanada 79' (o.g.) | J. League | Miura (yellow card) 27'; Ōenoki 65' | Attendance: 13,416; Referee: Shinichirō Obata; Assistant referees: Kimio Izaki, Masato Nogami; Fourth official: Kazuya Isokawa |

| 12 August 1995 2nd-1 | Shimizu S-Pulse | 0–1 | Sanfrecce Hiroshima | Nihondaira Sports Stadium |
| 19:01 JST (UTC+09) | Yamada (yellow card) 69' | J. League | Hašek 84'; Noh (yellow card) 89' | Attendance: 20,117; Referee: Fumikazu Shioyazono; Assistant referees: Morihisa Yamaguchi, Kimio Izaki; Fourth official: Naoki Uchiyama |

| 16 August 1995 2nd-2 | Urawa Red Diamonds | 1–2 | Shimizu S-Pulse | Urawa Komaba Stadium |
| 19:07 JST (UTC+09) | Fukuda 3' | J. League | Sanada (yellow card) 60'; Massaro 74'; Ōenoki (yellow card) 76'; T. Itō 80' | Attendance: 21,559; Referee: Alfredo Trentalange; Assistant referees: Yasuhiro Matsuzaki, Satoru Ishizawa; Fourth official: Toshimitsu Yasumoto; Man of the Match: Massaro |

| 19 August 1995 2nd-3 | Shimizu S-Pulse | 2–0 | Bellmare Hiratsuka | Tokyo National Stadium |
| 19:03 JST (UTC+09) | Sawanobori 44', 74'; Naitō (yellow card) 79' | J. League | Watanabe (yellow card) 35' | Attendance: 32,663; Referee: Kenji Tanaka; Assistant referees: Takashi Kunori, Masato Nogami; Fourth official: Yoshikazu Ozaki; Man of the Match: Masaaki Sawanobori |

| 23 August 1995 2nd-4 | Yokohama Marinos | 0–1 | Shimizu S-Pulse | Yokohama Mitsuzawa Football Stadium |
| 19:03 JST (UTC+09) | Ihara (yellow card) 80' | J. League | Dias 46' (pen.); Miura (yellow card) 85' | Attendance: 12,764; Referee: Fumikazu Shioyazono; Assistant referees: Masato Nogami, Ichirō Inukai; Fourth official: Mitsune Yamaguchi; Man of the Match: Masanori Sanada |

| 26 August 1995 2nd-5 | Shimizu S-Pulse | 0–2 | Júbilo Iwata | Nihondaira Sports Stadium |
| 19:01 JST (UTC+09) | Morioka (yellow card) 25'; Ōenoki (yellow card) 76'; Dias (yellow card) 77'; Naitō (yellow card) 79' | J. League | Nakayama 35', 86' | Attendance: 20,295; Referee: Keiichi Sunakawa; Assistant referees: Takeshi Ōkura, Sōichirō Kaneko; Fourth official: Toshiyuki Asanuma |

| 2 September 1995 2nd-6 | JEF United Ichihara | 0–1 | Shimizu S-Pulse | Tokyo National Stadium |
| 19:05 JST (UTC+09) | | J. League | Dias 89' | Attendance: 35,040; Referee: Zoran Petrović; Assistant referees: Mitsuru Satō, Kazuhisa Osada; Fourth official: Tsutomu Anazawa; Man of the Match: Dias |

| 6 September 1995 2nd-7 | Shimizu S-Pulse | 2–0 | Nagoya Grampus Eight | Nihondaira Sports Stadium |
| 19:02 JST (UTC+09) | Massaro 14'; Morioka (yellow card) 68'; T. Itō 89' | J. League | Torres (yellow card) 20'; Durix (yellow card) 44' | Attendance: 17,005; Referee: Fumikazu Shioyazono; Assistant referees: Naoyuki Mori, Kōji Minami; Fourth official: Masakazu Hōjō; Man of the Match: Takumi Horiike |

| 9 September 1995 2nd-8 | Shimizu S-Pulse | 1–1 (V-goal) (a.e.t.) (9–8 p) | Verdy Kawasaki | Tokyo National Stadium |
| 19:05 JST (UTC+09) | Dias 15' | J. League | Pereira (yellow card) 25'; Hashiratani (yellow card) 33'; Kitazawa 73' | Attendance: 43,502; Referee: Kenji Tanaka; Assistant referees: Noboru Ishiyama, Tetsu Karakida; Fourth official: Noritake Sakurada; Man of the Match: Santos |
| | Penalties |
| | (penalty scored) Santos; (penalty scored) Miura; (penalty scored) Ōenoki; (penalty scored) Horiike; (penalty scored) Massaro; (penalty scored) Mukōjima; (penalty scored) Morioka; (penalty scored) T. Itō; (penalty missed) Naitō; (penalty scored) Nagahashi | | (penalty scored) Hashiratani; (penalty scored) Pereira; (penalty scored) T. Kikuchi; (penalty scored) Bismarck; (penalty scored) Kitazawa; (penalty scored) Fujiyoshi; (penalty scored) Ishizuka; (penalty scored) Takeda; (penalty missed) Nakamura; (penalty missed) Tsunami |

| 13 September 1995 2nd-9 | Kashima Antlers | 2–3 (V-goal) (a.e.t.) | Shimizu S-Pulse | Kashima Soccer Stadium |
| 19:03 JST (UTC+09) | Mozer (yellow card) 72'; Masuda 87', 87'; Jorginho (yellow card) 96' | J. League | Massaro 17'; Sanada (yellow card) 82'; Dias 84' 106' | Attendance: 16,093; Referee: Armando Perez; Assistant referees: Hiroshi Fukuda, Takashi Kunori; Fourth official: Michio Horie; Man of the Match: Dias |

| 16 September 1995 2nd-10 | Yokohama Flügels | 0–3 | Shimizu S-Pulse | Nagasaki Stadium |
| 19:04 JST (UTC+09) | César Sampaio (yellow card) 49' (yellow-red card) 79'; Yamaguchi (yellow card) 62' | J. League | Mukōjima 24'; Dias 34', 50' | Attendance: 11,591; Referee: Tatsumi Ōno; Assistant referees: Hiroshi Tanabe, Hideaki Harada; Fourth official: Shigehisa Yamaguchi; Man of the Match: Yasutoshi Miura |

| 23 September 1995 2nd-11 | Shimizu S-Pulse | 0–1 (V-goal) (a.e.t.) | Gamba Osaka | Nihondaira Sports Stadium |
| 16:03 JST (UTC+09) | | J. League | Kondō (yellow card) 80'; Protassov (yellow card) 89'; Gillhaus 96' | Attendance: 19,209; Referee: Tetsuya Hamana; Assistant referees: Naoyuki Mori, Mikio Fukuoka; Fourth official: Naoki Uchiyama |

| 27 September 1995 2nd-12 | Shimizu S-Pulse | 2–1 (V-goal) (a.e.t.) | Cerezo Osaka | Nihondaira Sports Stadium |
| 19:00 JST (UTC+09) | A. Santos 66'; Sawanobori 99' | J. League | Morishima 35' | Attendance: 14,340; Referee: Masayoshi Okada; Assistant referees: Kazuhisa Osada, Takayoshi Kashino; Fourth official: Toshiyuki Asanuma; Man of the Match: Masaaki Sawanobori |

| 30 September 1995 2nd-13 | Kashiwa Reysol | 2–3 | Shimizu S-Pulse | Kashiwa Hitachi Stadium |
| 15:04 JST (UTC+09) | Bentinho 20', 44' | J. League | Shirai 6'; Nagahashi 61'; Marco 85' | Attendance: 12,332; Referee: Zoran Petrović; Assistant referees: Kenichi Koshiyama, Akihisa Makino; Fourth official: Masahiko Tsuma; Man of the Match: Marco |

| 4 October 1995 2nd-14 | Shimizu S-Pulse | 2–1 (V-goal) (a.e.t.) | Urawa Red Diamonds | Nihondaira Sports Stadium |
| 19:03 JST (UTC+09) | Sawanobori (yellow card) 3'; Marco 22'; Marcelo (yellow card) 39'; Santos 98' | J. League | Toninho 16'; Yamada (yellow card) 42' (yellow-red card) 42' | Attendance: 17,934; Referee: Armando Perez; Assistant referees: Masahiro Katagiri, Toshimitsu Yoshida; Fourth official: Masakazu Hōjō; Man of the Match: Santos |

| 7 October 1995 2nd-15 | Bellmare Hiratsuka | 0–4 | Shimizu S-Pulse | Tokyo National Stadium |
| 15:06 JST (UTC+09) | Kumon (yellow card) 73' | J. League | T. Itō 20'; Sawanobori 41'; Marco 68'; Santos 74' (pen.) | Attendance: 34,883; Referee: Zoran Petrović; Assistant referees: Hiroshi Fukuda, Kō Ōishi; Fourth official: Keizō Yamazaki; Man of the Match: Teruyoshi Itō |

| 14 October 1995 2nd-16 | Shimizu S-Pulse | 3–1 | Yokohama Marinos | Nihondaira Sports Stadium |
| 17:03 JST (UTC+09) | Marco 24', (yellow card) 25'; Sawanobori 30', 38'; Shirai (yellow card) 32' (yellow-red card) 67' | J. League | Medina Bello (yellow card) 17'; Ihara (yellow card) 60'; Omura 87' | Attendance: 19,943; Referee: Kazuo Kakihana; Assistant referees: Morihisa Yamaguchi, Kazuhisa Osada; Fourth official: Toshiyuki Asanuma; Man of the Match: Masaaki Sawanobori |

| 18 October 1995 2nd-17 | Júbilo Iwata | 3–2 (V-goal) (a.e.t.) | Shimizu S-Pulse | Júbilo Iwata Stadium |
| 19:00 JST (UTC+09) | Schillaci 39', 110'; Nakayama 66'; Vanenburg (yellow card) 86' | J. League | Marco 25'; Hasegawa 69'; Santos (yellow card) 70' | Attendance: 17,976; Referee: Fumikazu Shioyazono; Assistant referees: Kazuaki Hamaguchi, Naoki Esumi; Fourth official: Tōru Nagata |

| 21 October 1995 2nd-18 | Shimizu S-Pulse | 1–3 | JEF United Ichihara | Ishikawa Kanazawa Stadium |
| 16:02 JST (UTC+09) | Marco 71' | J. League | Rufer 50'; Mutō 55'; Niimura (yellow card) 85'; Nakanishi 88' | Attendance: 12,611; Referee: Kiyoshi Ōta; Assistant referees: Takashi Kunori, Kōji Taniuchi; Fourth official: Tsutomu Kaji |

| 1 November 1995 2nd-19 | Nagoya Grampus Eight | 2–1 | Shimizu S-Pulse | Nagoya Mizuho Athletics Stadium |
| 19:05 JST (UTC+09) | Iijima (yellow card) 34'; Asano 61'; Ogura 70' | J. League | Sawanobori 17' (pen.); Dias (yellow card) 26' | Attendance: 22,329; Referee: Masayoshi Okada; Assistant referees: Yoshikazu Hiroshima, Hiroyuki Izumi; Fourth official: Kazuo Koyake |

| 4 November 1995 2nd-20 | Verdy Kawasaki | 3–1 | Shimizu S-Pulse | Kawasaki Todoroki Stadium |
| 15:03 JST (UTC+09) | Takeda 2'; Fujiyoshi 72'; Ramos 74' | J. League | A. Santos 43' | Attendance: 21,337; Referee: Jamal Al-Sharif; Assistant referees: Hitoshi Yamada, Takeshi Ōkura; Fourth official: Takeshi Ōgiya |

| 8 November 1995 2nd-21 | Shimizu S-Pulse | 3–0 | Kashima Antlers | Nihondaira Sports Stadium |
| 19:00 JST (UTC+09) | Marco 65'; Sawanobori (yellow card) 71'; T. Itō 74'; Morioka 78' | J. League | Masuda (yellow card) 10'; Ishii (yellow card) 20'; Akita (yellow card) 67' | Attendance: 18,222; Referee: Yoshitsugu Katayama; Assistant referees: Hiroshi Tanabe, Kazuhisa Osada; Fourth official: Naoki Uchiyama; Man of the Match: Kenta Hasegawa |

| 11 November 1995 2nd-22 | Shimizu S-Pulse | 0–1 | Yokohama Flügels | Nihondaira Sports Stadium |
| 15:05 JST (UTC+09) | Horiike (yellow card) 84' | J. League | Koizumi (yellow card) 33'; Urakami 39' (o.g.); Hatō (yellow card) 56'; Miura (yellow card) 83'; Ōtake (yellow card) 89' | Attendance: 20,145; Referee: Jamal Al-Sharif; Assistant referees: Tetsu Karakida, Hisaharu Kitamura; Fourth official: Masakazu Hōjō |

| 15 November 1995 2nd-23 | Gamba Osaka | 3–2 (V-goal) (a.e.t.) | Shimizu S-Pulse | Expo '70 Commemorative Stadium |
| 19:03 JST (UTC+09) | Gillhaus 41'; 51' (o.g.); Kondō (yellow card) 81'; Y. Matsuyama 106' | J. League | Marco 24'; Yoshida 50'; Shirai (yellow card) 82' | Attendance: 7,320; Referee: Zoran Petrović; Assistant referees: Sōichirō Kaneko, Akio Okutani; Fourth official: Yoshikazu Hiroshima |

| 18 November 1995 2nd-24 | Cerezo Osaka | 3–0 | Shimizu S-Pulse | Osaka Nagai No.2 Stadium |
| 15:00 JST (UTC+09) | Marquinhos 69'; Bernardo 72'; 87' (o.g.) | J. League | Miura (yellow card) 31' | Attendance: 11,477; Referee: Armando Perez; Assistant referees: Noboru Ishiyama, Kōji Minami; Fourth official: Tsuyoshi Miyake |

| 22 November 1995 2nd-25 | Shimizu S-Pulse | 1–3 | Kashiwa Reysol | Nihondaira Sports Stadium |
| 19:05 JST (UTC+09) | Marco 45' | J. League | Bentinho 10', 25'; Caio 41', (yellow card) 81'; Nelsinho (yellow card) 47' | Attendance: 17,358; Referee: Yoshimi Ogawa; Assistant referees: Masahiro Katagiri, Ichirō Inukai; Fourth official: Toshiyuki Asanuma |

| 25 November 1995 2nd-26 | Sanfrecce Hiroshima | 0–2 | Shimizu S-Pulse | Hiroshima Big Arch |
| 15:03 JST (UTC+09) | | J. League | Santos 11'; Sawanobori 86' (pen.) | Attendance: 10,098; Referee: Kiyoshi Ōta; Assistant referees: Yasuhiro Hemmi, Satoru Kawano; Fourth official: Norio Kuriyama; Man of the Match: Takumi Horiike |

=== Emperor's Cup ===
| 3 December 1995 1st Round | Vissel Kobe | 2–0 | Shimizu S-Pulse | Nihondaira Sports Stadium |
| 13:00 JST (UTC+09) | Ziad ?', ?' |

== Player statistics ==
| Pos. | Nat. | Player | D.o.B. (Age) | Height / Weight | J.League | | Emperor's Cup | | Total | |
| Pos. | Nat. | Player | D.o.B. (Age) | Height / Weight | Apps | Goals | Apps | Goals | Apps | Goals |
|---|---|---|---|---|---|---|---|---|---|---|
| GK | (Brazil) | Sidmar | June 13, 1962 (aged 32) | 183 cm / 78 kg | 14 | 0 | 0 | 0 | 14 | 0 |
| FW | (Japan) | Akihiro Nagashima | April 9, 1964 (aged 30) | 181 cm / 76 kg | 10 | 1 | 0 | 0 | 10 | 1 |
| FW | (Brazil) | Toninho | March 23, 1965 (aged 29) | 186 cm / 79 kg | 25 | 11 | 0 | 0 | 25 | 11 |
| MF | (Japan) | Katsumi Ōenoki | April 3, 1965 (aged 29) | 178 cm / 71 kg | 39 | 1 | 1 | 0 | 40 | 1 |
| DF | (Brazil) | Ronaldo | June 19, 1965 (aged 29) | 188 cm / 89 kg | 10 | 0 | 0 | 0 | 10 | 0 |
| MF | (Japan) | Yasutoshi Miura | July 15, 1965 (aged 29) | 171 cm / 65 kg | 48 | 2 | 1 | 0 | 49 | 2 |
| DF | (Japan) | Takumi Horiike | September 6, 1965 (aged 29) | 173 cm / 66 kg | 40 | 0 | 1 | 0 | 41 | 0 |
| FW | (Japan) | Kenta Hasegawa | September 25, 1965 (aged 29) | 177 cm / 77 kg | 21 | 3 | 0 | 0 | 21 | 3 |
| FW | (Japan) | Tatsuru Mukōjima | January 9, 1966 (aged 29) | 161 cm / 53 kg | 29 | 2 | 0 | 0 | 29 | 2 |
| MF | (Brazil) | Dias | May 5, 1967 (aged 27) | 173 cm / 65 kg | 32 | 17 | 1 | 0 | 33 | 17 |
| MF | (Japan) | Masao Sugimoto | June 26, 1967 (aged 27) | 167 cm / 64 kg | 0 | 0 | | | | |
| DF | (Japan) | Yasuhiro Yamada | February 13, 1968 (aged 27) | 174 cm / 73 kg | 2 | 0 | 0 | 0 | 2 | 0 |
| GK | (Japan) | Masanori Sanada | March 6, 1968 (aged 27) | 178 cm / 73 kg | 34 | 0 | 1 | 0 | 35 | 0 |
| MF | (Brazil) / (Japan) (Note: He was naturalized in Japan in September 1995.) | Santos / Ademir Santos | March 28, 1968 (aged 26) | 174 cm / 64 kg | 8 | 2 | 0 | 0 | 8 | 2 |
| DF | (Japan) | Naoki Naitō | May 30, 1968 (aged 26) | 180 cm / 78 kg | 40 | 0 | 1 | 0 | 41 | 0 |
| FW | (Japan) | Fumiaki Aoshima | July 12, 1968 (aged 26) | 178 cm / 76 kg | 1 | 0 | 0 | 0 | 1 | 0 |
| GK | (Japan) | Takeshi Urakami | February 7, 1969 (aged 26) | 182 cm / 79 kg | 5 | 0 | 0 | 0 | 5 | 0 |
| GK | (Japan) | Katsumi Ōtaki | June 9, 1969 (aged 25) | 184 cm / 70 kg | 0 | 0 | | | | |
| MF | (Japan) | Yasuhiro Yoshida | July 14, 1969 (aged 25) | 172 cm / 70 kg | 33 | 2 | 0 | 0 | 33 | 2 |
| DF | (Japan) | Hiroaki Hiraoka | September 2, 1969 (aged 25) | 180 cm / 70 kg | 1 | 0 | 0 | 0 | 1 | 0 |
| MF | (Japan) | Masaaki Sawanobori | January 12, 1970 (aged 25) | 170 cm / 66 kg | 40 | 13 | 1 | 0 | 41 | 13 |
| MF | (Japan) | Takamitsu Ōta | July 19, 1970 (aged 24) | 172 cm / 65 kg | 8 | 0 | 0 | 0 | 8 | 0 |
| GK | (Japan) | Kōji Nakahara | July 27, 1970 (aged 24) | 178 cm / 78 kg | 0 | 0 | | | | |
| DF | (Japan) | Kiyoshi Nakamura | May 20, 1971 (aged 23) | 176 cm / 68 kg | 0 | 0 | | | | |
| MF/DF | (Japan) | Kenji Tanaka | October 10, 1971 (aged 23) | 170 cm / 68 kg | 0 | 0 | | | | |
| DF | (Japan) | Masahiro Andō | April 2, 1972 (aged 22) | 176 cm / 67 kg | 7 | 0 | 0 | 0 | 7 | 0 |
| FW | (Japan) | Jun Iwashita | April 8, 1973 (aged 21) | 173 cm / 70 kg | 7 | 0 | 0 | 0 | 7 | 0 |
| MF | (Japan) | Noriaki Asakura | May 11, 1973 (aged 21) | 174 cm / 69 kg | 4 | 0 | 0 | 0 | 4 | 0 |
| FW | (Japan) | Yuzuki Itō | April 7, 1974 (aged 20) | 172 cm / 65 kg | 18 | 0 | 1 | 0 | 19 | 0 |
| DF | (Japan) | Hiroyuki Shirai | June 17, 1974 (aged 20) | 180 cm / 70 kg | 24 | 1 | 1 | 0 | 25 | 1 |
| FW | (Japan) | Hiroaki Tajima | June 27, 1974 (aged 20) | 173 cm / 63 kg | 17 | 1 | 1 | 0 | 18 | 1 |
| MF | (Japan) | Teruyoshi Itō | August 31, 1974 (aged 20) | 168 cm / 72 kg | 44 | 4 | 1 | 0 | 45 | 4 |
| MF | (Japan) | Noriaki Suzuki | April 23, 1975 (aged 19) | 165 cm / 60 kg | 0 | 0 | | | | |
| FW | (Japan) | Ryūzō Shimizu | July 1, 1975 (aged 19) | 173 cm / 68 kg | 0 | 0 | | | | |
| MF | (Japan) | Yasuhiro Nagahashi | August 2, 1975 (aged 19) | 170 cm / 67 kg | 29 | 1 | 1 | 0 | 30 | 1 |
| DF | (Japan) | Shinichi Niimura | April 20, 1976 (aged 18) | 174 cm / 68 kg | 0 | 0 | | | | |
| MF | (Japan) | Yukihiko Satō | May 11, 1976 (aged 18) | 177 cm / 68 kg | 1 | 0 | 0 | 0 | 1 | 0 |
| FW | (Italy) | Massaro † | May 23, 1961 (aged 33) | 179 cm / 74 kg | 9 | 3 | 0 | 0 | 9 | 3 |
| FW | (Brazil) | Marco † | February 8, 1972 (aged 23) | 182 cm / 72 kg | 14 | 9 | 1 | 0 | 15 | 9 |
| MF | (Brazil) | Santos † | December 9, 1960 (aged 34) | 176 cm / 74 kg | 18 | 3 | 1 | 0 | 19 | 3 |
| DF | (Brazil) | Marcelo † | August 20, 1975 (aged 19) | 182 cm / 70 kg | 5 | 0 | 0 | 0 | 5 | 0 |
| DF | (Japan) | Ryūzō Morioka † | October 7, 1975 (aged 19) | 180 cm / 71 kg | 25 | 1 | 0 | 0 | 25 | 1 |

- † player(s) joined the team after the opening of this season.

== Transfers ==
In:

| No. | Pos. | Nation | Player |
|---|---|---|---|
| — | GK | BRA | Sidmar (from XV de Piracicaba) |
| — | GK | JPN | Takeshi Urakami (from Yokohama Marinos) |
| — | DF | JPN | Masahiro Andō (from Kokushikan University) |
| — | DF | JPN | Shinichi Niimura (from Shimizu Commercial High School) |
| — | MF | BRA | Carlos Alberto Dias (from Paraná Clube) |
| — | MF | JPN | Yasuhiro Yoshida (from Kashima Antlers) |
| — | MF | JPN | Yukihiko Satō (from Shimizu Commercial High School) |

Out:

| No. | Pos. | Nation | Player |
|---|---|---|---|
| — | GK | JPN | Keiji Chiba |
| — | DF | JPN | Shinichirō Katō |
| — | DF | JPN | Shōichi Tanaka |
| — | DF | JPN | Hiroshi Saitō (to Brummel Sendai) |
| — | DF | JPN | Masaharu Kotani |
| — | DF | JPN | Manabu Mochizuki |
| — | DF | JPN | Takahiro Yamamoto |
| — | MF | BRA | Djalminha |
| — | FW | JPN | Shinya Matsubara |
| — | FW | JPN | Takeshi Saitō |
| — | FW | JPN | Ryūji Okada |

== Transfers during the season ==
=== In ===
- (Italy) Daniele Massaro (from A.C. Milan on July)
- (Brazil) Marco Aurelio Silva Businhani (on July)
- (Brazil) Santos (from Kashima Antlers on August)
- (Brazil) Marcelo Miguel Pelissari (from Guarani on September)
- (Japan) Ryūzō Morioka (from Kashima Antlers)

=== Out ===
- (Brazil) Toninho (loan to Urawa Red Diamonds on August)
- (Brazil) Sidmar (on September)
- (Japan) Akihiro Nagashima (to Vissel Kobe)
- (Japan) Fumiaki Aoshima (to Tosu Futures)

== Awards ==
none

== Other pages ==
- (in Japanese) J. League official site
- (in Japanese) Shimizu S-Pulse official site
