= 1995 Verdy Kawasaki season =

Verdy Kawasaki
1995 season
- Manager: Nelsinho
- Stadium: Kawasaki Todoroki Stadium
- J.League: Runners-up
- Emperor's Cup: Quarterfinals
- Super Cup: Winner
- Sanwa Bank Cup: Runners-up
- Asian Club Championship: Quarterfinals
- Top goalscorer: League: Kazuyoshi Miura (23); All: Nobuhiro Takeda (26)
- Highest home attendance: 20,974 (vs Kashima Antlers, 21 October 1995); 50,820 (vs Shimizu S-Pulse, 1 April 1995, Tokyo National Stadium)
- Lowest home attendance: 12,035 (vs Nagoya Grampus Eight, 12 July 1995)
- Average home league attendance: 20,834
Home colours	Away colours

1995 Verdy Kawasaki season

== Review and events ==
Verdy Kawasaki won J.League NICOS series (second stage).

=== League results summary ===
Overall								Home						Away					
Pld	W	D	L	GF	GA	GD	Pts	W	D	L	GF	GA	GD	W	D	L	GF	GA	GD
52	35	0	17	106	62	+44	108	20	0	6	51	25	+26	15	0	11	55	37	+18

Source: J.LEAGUE OFFICIAL RECORD & DATA 1996. ISBN 4-09-102323-1.

=== League results by round ===
J.League Suntory series (first stage)
Round	1	2	3	4	5	6	7	8	9	10	11	12	13	14	15	16	17	18	19	20	21	22	23	24	25	26
Ground	H	A	H	A	H	H	A	H	A	H	A	H	A	H	A	H	A	A	H	A	H	A	H	A	H	A
Result	W	L	L	L	L	L	L	W	L	W	L	W	L	L	W	W	W	W	W	W	W	W	W	W	W	W
Position	7	11	13	14	14	14	14	13	14	12	14	12	10	12	11	11	10	10	8	7	7	7	6	5	2	2

Source: J.LEAGUE OFFICIAL RECORD & DATA 1996. ISBN 4-09-102323-1.
A = Away; H = Home; W = Win; D = Draw; L = Loss

J.League NICOS series (second stage)
Round	1	2	3	4	5	6	7	8	9	10	11	12	13	14	15	16	17	18	19	20	21	22	23	24	25	26
Ground	H	A	H	A	H	A	H	A	H	H	A	H	A	H	A	H	A	H	A	H	A	A	H	A	H	A
Result	W	W	W	L	W	W	W	L	W	W	W	W	W	W	W	W	W	L	W	W	W	L	W	L	L	L
Position	3	2	2	4	3	2	1	1	1	1	1	1	1	1	1	1	1	1	1	1	1	1	1	1	1	1

Source: J.LEAGUE OFFICIAL RECORD & DATA 1996. ISBN 4-09-102323-1.
A = Away; H = Home; W = Win; D = Draw; L = Loss

== Competitions ==
Competitions	Position
J.League	Runners-up / 14 clubs
Emperor's Cup	Quarterfinals
Super Cup	Champions
Sanwa Bank Cup	Runners-up
Asian Club Championship	Quarterfinals

== Domestic results ==
=== J.League ===
18 March 1995 1st-1	Verdy Kawasaki	0–0 (V-goal) (a.e.t.) (7–6 p)	Bellmare Hiratsuka	Tokyo National Stadium
19:05 JST (UTC+09)		J. League		Attendance: 48,103; Referee: Lutz Fröhlich; Assistant referees: Yasuhiro Matsuzaki, Tetsu Karakida; Fourth official: Keizō Yamazaki; Man of the Match: Takayuki Fujikawa
	Penalties
	(penalty scored) Bismarck; (penalty scored) Alcindo; (penalty missed) Hashiratani; (penalty missed) Kitazawa; (penalty scored) Pereira; (penalty scored) Takeda; (penalty scored) Nakamura; (penalty scored) Hasebe; (penalty scored) Ishikawa		(penalty scored) Betinho; (penalty scored) Noguchi; (penalty missed) Tasaka; (penalty missed) Natsuka; (penalty scored) Edson; (penalty scored) Narahashi; (penalty scored) Watanabe; (penalty scored) Yamamoto; (penalty missed) Nishiyama

22 March 1995 1st-2	Yokohama Marinos	6–2	Verdy Kawasaki	Yokohama Mitsuzawa Football Stadium
19:03 JST (UTC+09)	Noda 5'; Miura 21'; Bisconti 25', 82' (pen.); 38' (o.g.); T. Yamada 72'	J. League	Fujiyoshi 52'; Hashiratani 62'	Attendance: 13,033; Referee: Shinichirō Obata; Assistant referees: Sōichirō Kaneko, Hiroshi Tanabe; Fourth official: Michio Nakahara

25 March 1995 1st-3	Verdy Kawasaki	0–1	Kashiwa Reysol	Toyama Stadium
19:04 JST (UTC+09)		J. League	Müller 13'	Attendance: 22,349; Referee: Armando Perez; Assistant referees: Tatsumi Ōno, Kōji Taniuchi; Fourth official: Atsushi Tanaka

29 March 1995 1st-4	Sanfrecce Hiroshima	2–0	Verdy Kawasaki	Hiroshima Big Arch
19:04 JST (UTC+09)	Hašek 17', 82'	J. League		Attendance: 17,333; Referee: Juan Carlos Crespi; Assistant referees: Hitoshi Yamada, Kōji Minami; Fourth official: Mamoru Ueda

1 April 1995 1st-5	Verdy Kawasaki	0–1	Shimizu S-Pulse	Tokyo National Stadium
15:03 JST (UTC+09)		J. League	Dias 24'	Attendance: 50.820; Referee: Naotsugu Fuse; Assistant referees: Toshiyuki Mayuzumi, Kenichi Koshiyama; Fourth official: Kōsei Gōukon

5 April 1995 1st-6	Verdy Kawasaki	0–1	Cerezo Osaka	Tokyo National Stadium
19:04 JST (UTC+09)		J. League	Kizawa 60'	Attendance: 44,650; Referee: Masayoshi Okada; Assistant referees: Mitsuru Satō, Masato Nogami; Fourth official: Tsutomu Anazawa

8 April 1995 1st-7	Kashima Antlers	1–0	Verdy Kawasaki	Kashima Soccer Stadium
19:31 JST (UTC+09)	Hasegawa 84'	J. League		Attendance: 15,825; Referee: Yoshimi Ogawa; Assistant referees: Kazuhisa Osada, Toshimitsu Yoshida; Fourth official: Atsushi Fujigasaki

12 April 1995 1st-8	Verdy Kawasaki	4–1	Yokohama Flügels	Kawasaki Todoroki Stadium
19:04 JST (UTC+09)	Alcindo 15'; Bismarck 35', 76' (pen.); Takeda 79'	J. League	Hattori 10'	Attendance: 14,940; Referee: Naotsugu Fuse; Assistant referees: Yasuhiro Matsuzaki, Akihisa Makino; Fourth official: Mineo Takada; Man of the Match: Ruy Ramos

15 April 1995 1st-9	JEF United Ichihara	1–0 (V-goal) (a.e.t.)	Verdy Kawasaki	Ichihara Stadium
15:04 JST (UTC+09)	Y. Gotō 99'	J. League		Attendance: 13,512; Referee: Keiichi Sunakawa; Assistant referees: Masahiro Katagiri, Ichirō Inukai; Fourth official: Morio Okamoto

22 April 1995 1st-10	Verdy Kawasaki	1–0	Gamba Osaka	Kawasaki Todoroki Stadium
19:04 JST (UTC+09)	Takeda 48'	J. League		Attendance: 12,713; Referee: Shinichirō Obata; Assistant referees: Takeshi Ōkura, Tetsu Karakida; Fourth official: Hiroshi Yashiro; Man of the Match: Nobuhiro Takeda

26 April 1995 1st-11	Nagoya Grampus Eight	4–3 (V-goal) (a.e.t.)	Verdy Kawasaki	Nagoya Mizuho Athletics Stadium
19:03 JST (UTC+09)	Mori 15'; Passi 35'; Hirano 56'; Moriyama 95'	J. League	Fujiyoshi 54'; Pereira 73' (pen.); Bismarck 82'	Attendance: 21,557; Referee: Fumikazu Shioyazono; Assistant referees: Kazuya Yanagisawa, Akio Okutani; Fourth official: Toshiya Narita

29 April 1995 1st-12	Verdy Kawasaki	3–2 (V-goal) (a.e.t.)	Júbilo Iwata	Kawasaki Todoroki Stadium
15:03 JST (UTC+09)	Hashiratani 26'; Takeda 35'; Kitazawa 110'	J. League	Koga 20'; Fujita 68'	Attendance: 14,201; Referee: Juan Carlos Crespi; Assistant referees: Noboru Ishiyama, Toshimitsu Yoshida; Fourth official: Kazuo Shirato; Man of the Match: Tetsuji Hashiratani

3 May 1995 1st-13	Urawa Red Diamonds	2–2 (V-goal) (a.e.t.) (4–3 p)	Verdy Kawasaki	Tokyo National Stadium
19:03 JST (UTC+09)	Bein 42'; Okano 85'	J. League	Pereira 18'; Kitazawa 68'	Attendance: 56,652; Referee: Kiyoshi Ōta; Assistant referees: Mitsuru Satō, Ichirō Inukai; Fourth official: Noritake Sakurada
	Penalties
	(penalty missed) Fukuda; (penalty scored) Taguchi; (penalty scored) Hirose; (penalty scored) Buchwald; (penalty scored) Mizuuchi		(penalty scored) Pereira; (penalty missed) Hashiratani; (penalty scored) Bismarck; (penalty missed) Hayashi; (penalty scored) Kitazawa

6 May 1995 1st-14	Verdy Kawasaki	2–3	Yokohama Marinos	Kawasaki Todoroki Stadium
19:04 JST (UTC+09)	Takeda 20'; Pereira 69' (pen.)	J. League	Medina Bello 2'; T. Yamada 56'; Miura 59'	Attendance: 14,789; Referee: Armando Perez; Assistant referees: Masato Nogami, Toshiyuki Mayuzumi; Fourth official: Takao Oura

10 May 1995 1st-15	Kashiwa Reysol	0–1	Verdy Kawasaki	Tokyo National Stadium
19:03 JST (UTC+09)		J. League	Kitazawa 44'	Attendance: 46,294; Referee: Naotsugu Fuse; Assistant referees: Hitoshi Yamada, Hisaharu Kitamura; Fourth official: Masao Yamanaka; Man of the Match: Kentarō Hayashi

13 May 1995 1st-16	Verdy Kawasaki	3–1	Sanfrecce Hiroshima	Kawasaki Todoroki Stadium
19:04 JST (UTC+09)	Takeda 40'; Hasebe 71'; Alcindo 89'	J. League	Moriyasu 75'	Attendance: 13,119; Referee: Lutz Fröhlich; Assistant referees: Kenichi Koshiyama, Tōru Kamikawa; Fourth official: Haruo Imai; Man of the Match: Shigetoshi Hasebe

17 June 1995 1st-17	Shimizu S-Pulse	0–4	Verdy Kawasaki	Nihondaira Sports Stadium
19:04 JST (UTC+09)		J. League	Hashiratani 3'; Takeda 10'; Alcindo 54'; Pereira 84'	Attendance: 18,776; Referee: Tetsuya Hamana; Assistant referees: Yoshikazu Hiroshima, Naoyuki Mori; Fourth official: Naoki Uchiyama; Man of the Match: Tetsuji Hashiratani

21 June 1995 1st-18	Cerezo Osaka	3–6	Verdy Kawasaki	Osaka Nagai No.2 Stadium
19:04 JST (UTC+09)	Valdés 62'; Kawamae 73'; Marquinhos 89'	J. League	Alcindo 19', 33'; Pereira 29' (pen.), 42' (pen.); Takeda 50'; Bismarck 84'	Attendance: 13,703; Referee: Armando Perez; Assistant referees: Kazuo Kakihana, Toshimitsu Yoshida; Fourth official: Sōichirō Kaneko; Man of the Match: Bismarck

24 June 1995 1st-19	Verdy Kawasaki	3–1	Kashima Antlers	Kawasaki Todoroki Stadium
19:30 JST (UTC+09)	Alcindo 44'; Kitazawa 69'; Takeda 76'	J. League	Koga 79'	Attendance: 13,602; Referee: Kiyoshi Ōta; Assistant referees: Yasushi Tsuchimoto, Kazuhisa Osada; Fourth official: Hideaki Ishii; Man of the Match: Bismarck

28 June 1995 1st-20	Yokohama Flügels	0–1	Verdy Kawasaki	Toyama Stadium
19:02 JST (UTC+09)		J. League	Takeda 41'	Attendance: 24,521; Referee: Kenji Tanaka; Assistant referees: Hitoshi Yamada, Kōji Taniuchi; Fourth official: Kinji Sakō; Man of the Match: Kentarō Hayashi

1 July 1995 1st-21	Verdy Kawasaki	2–2 (V-goal) (a.e.t.) (3–2 p)	JEF United Ichihara	Kawasaki Todoroki Stadium
19:04 JST (UTC+09)	Takeda 27', 66'	J. League	Maslovar 69' (pen.), 89'	Attendance: 12,696; Referee: Juan Carlos Crespi; Assistant referees: Mitsuru Satō, Hiroyuki Izumi; Fourth official: Hiroshi Yamaguchi; Man of the Match: Shinkichi Kikuchi
	Penalties
	(penalty scored) Hashiratani; (penalty scored) Pereira; (penalty missed) Bismarck; (penalty scored) Watanabe; (penalty missed) Kitazawa		(penalty scored) Ejiri; (penalty missed) Vasilijević; (penalty missed) Echigo; (penalty scored) M. Miyazawa; (penalty missed) Maslovar

8 July 1995 1st-22	Gamba Osaka	0–1	Verdy Kawasaki	Expo '70 Commemorative Stadium
19:00 JST (UTC+09)		J. League	Hashiratani 58'	Attendance: 19,486; Referee: Lutz Fröhlich; Assistant referees: Peter Augar, Olaf Blumenstein; Fourth official: Tsuyoshi Miyake; Man of the Match: Shigetoshi Hasebe

12 July 1995 1st-23	Verdy Kawasaki	2–1 (V-goal) (a.e.t.)	Nagoya Grampus Eight	Kawasaki Todoroki Stadium
19:01 JST (UTC+09)	Takeda 31'; Fujiyoshi 107'	J. League	Torres 36'	Attendance: 12,035; Referee: Armando Perez; Assistant referees: Masato Nogami, Akihisa Makino; Fourth official: Mineo Takada; Man of the Match: Pereira

15 July 1995 1st-24	Júbilo Iwata	0–1	Verdy Kawasaki	Júbilo Iwata Stadium
19:03 JST (UTC+09)		J. League	Kitazawa 87'	Attendance: 18,961; Referee: Yōtarō Moritsu; Assistant referees: Morihisa Yamaguchi, Mikio Fukuoka; Fourth official: Tōru Nagata; Man of the Match: Satoshi Tsunami

19 July 1995 1st-25	Verdy Kawasaki	2–1 (V-goal) (a.e.t.)	Urawa Red Diamonds	Kawasaki Todoroki Stadium
19:00 JST (UTC+09)	Sugawara 54'; Alcindo 102'	J. League	Buchwald 75'	Attendance: 12,761; Referee: Fumikazu Shioyazono; Assistant referees: Yū Nakamura, Takuji Fukazawa; Fourth official: Nobutaka Fukamiya; Man of the Match: Tomo Sugawara

22 July 1995 1st-26	Bellmare Hiratsuka	2–3	Verdy Kawasaki	Hiratsuka Stadium
19:03 JST (UTC+09)	70' (o.g.); Sorimachi 72'	J. League	Hasebe 18'; Alcindo 49'; Takeda 89'	Attendance: 16,082; Referee: Hiroyuki Umemoto; Assistant referees: Yū Nakamura, Akihisa Makino; Fourth official: Susumu Takeda; Man of the Match: Toshimi Kikuchi

12 August 1995 2nd-1	Verdy Kawasaki	3–1	Bellmare Hiratsuka	Kawasaki Todoroki Stadium
19:04 JST (UTC+09)	Alcindo 11'; Miura 16', 23'	J. League	Edson 57'	Attendance: 13,931; Referee: Yoshimi Ogawa; Assistant referees: Noboru Ishiyama, Takayoshi Kashino; Fourth official: Mineo Takada; Man of the Match: Kazuyoshi Miura

16 August 1995 2nd-2	Yokohama Marinos	0–1	Verdy Kawasaki	Tokyo National Stadium
19:03 JST (UTC+09)		J. League	Alcindo 33'	Attendance: 52,699; Referee: Naotsugu Fuse; Assistant referees: Yoshikazu Hiroshima, Hiroshi Tanabe; Fourth official: Masao Yamanaka; Man of the Match: Bismarck

19 August 1995 2nd-3	Verdy Kawasaki	1–0	Júbilo Iwata	Kawasaki Todoroki Stadium
19:03 JST (UTC+09)	17' (o.g.)	J. League		Attendance: 15,757; Referee: Zoran Petrović; Assistant referees: Kazuya Yanagisawa, Satoru Ishizawa; Fourth official: Hideaki Ishii; Man of the Match: Pereira

23 August 1995 2nd-4	JEF United Ichihara	3–1	Verdy Kawasaki	Ichihara Stadium
19:04 JST (UTC+09)	Niimura 51', 66'; Jō 62'	J. League	Kitazawa 24'	Attendance: 15,234; Referee: Tetsuya Hamana; Assistant referees: Yū Nakamura, Akihisa Makino; Fourth official: Fujirō Masukura

26 August 1995 2nd-5	Verdy Kawasaki	3–2	Nagoya Grampus Eight	Kawasaki Todoroki Stadium
19:03 JST (UTC+09)	Alcindo 37'; Takeda 70'; Bismarck 89'	J. League	Ogura 12'; Moriyama 85'	Attendance: 15,503; Referee: Kenji Tanaka; Assistant referees: Mitsuru Satō, Tetsu Karakida; Fourth official: Tatsuo Kamekura; Man of the Match: Tadashi Nakamura

2 September 1995 2nd-6	Kashima Antlers	1–5	Verdy Kawasaki	Kashima Soccer Stadium
19:05 JST (UTC+09)	Hashimoto 71'	J. League	Takeda 35'; Miura 42', 55', 64'; Kitazawa 83'	Attendance: 16,628; Referee: Alfredo Trentalange; Assistant referees: Toshiyuki Mayuzumi, Kō Ōishi; Fourth official: Takao Onshi; Man of the Match: Kazuyoshi Miura

6 September 1995 2nd-7	Verdy Kawasaki	2–0	Gamba Osaka	Kawasaki Todoroki Stadium
19:03 JST (UTC+09)	Bismarck 61'; Miura 81'	J. League		Attendance: 16,455; Referee: Yoshimi Ogawa; Assistant referees: Yū Nakamura, Ichirō Inukai; Fourth official: Haruo Suzuki; Man of the Match: Shinkichi Kikuchi

9 September 1995 2nd-8	Shimizu S-Pulse	1–1 (V-goal) (a.e.t.) (9–8 p)	Verdy Kawasaki	Tokyo National Stadium
19:05 JST (UTC+09)	Dias 15'	J. League	Kitazawa 73'	Attendance: 43,502; Referee: Kenji Tanaka; Assistant referees: Noboru Ishiyama, Tetsu Karakida; Fourth official: Noritake Sakurada
	Penalties
	(penalty scored) Santos; (penalty scored) Miura; (penalty scored) Ōenoki; (penalty scored) Horiike; (penalty scored) Massaro; (penalty scored) Mukōjima; (penalty scored) Morioka; (penalty scored) T. Itō; (penalty missed) Naitō; (penalty scored) Nagahashi		(penalty scored) Hashiratani; (penalty scored) Pereira; (penalty scored) T. Kikuchi; (penalty scored) Bismarck; (penalty scored) Kitazawa; (penalty scored) Fujiyoshi; (penalty scored) Ishizuka; (penalty scored) Takeda; (penalty missed) Nakamura; (penalty missed) Tsunami

13 September 1995 2nd-9	Verdy Kawasaki	4–1	Yokohama Flügels	Tokyo National Stadium
19:00 JST (UTC+09)	Kitazawa 8'; Miura 41', 52', 87'	J. League	Zinho 6'	Attendance: 43,279; Referee: Tetsuya Hamana; Assistant referees: Toshiyuki Mayuzumi, Hisaharu Kitamura; Fourth official: Yoshikazu Ozaki; Man of the Match: Kazuyoshi Miura

16 September 1995 2nd-10	Verdy Kawasaki	2–1 (V-goal) (a.e.t.)	Cerezo Osaka	Sapporo Atsubetsu Stadium
14:01 JST (UTC+09)	Bismarck 4'; Hashiratani 98'	J. League	Valdés 49'	Attendance: 18,786; Referee: Zoran Petrović; Assistant referees: Kenichi Koshiyama, Kōji Taniuchi; Fourth official: Eiji Kaneda; Man of the Match: Ruy Ramos

23 September 1995 2nd-11	Kashiwa Reysol	1–7	Verdy Kawasaki	Kashiwa Hitachi Stadium
15:03 JST (UTC+09)	Caio 67'	J. League	Alcindo 37', 51'; Kitazawa 43'; Bismarck 66', 82'; Miura 74', 77'	Attendance: 14,032; Referee: Yasuhiro Matsuzaki; Assistant referees: Tatsumi Ōno, Kō Ōishi; Fourth official: Kazuya Isokawa; Man of the Match: Tsuyoshi Kitazawa

27 September 1995 2nd-12	Verdy Kawasaki	3–0	Sanfrecce Hiroshima	Hakatanomori Football Stadium
19:03 JST (UTC+09)	Alcindo 63', 81'; Miura 89'	J. League		Attendance: 16,965; Referee: Armando Perez; Assistant referees: Yasuhiro Hemmi, Tōru Kamikawa; Fourth official: Masatoshi Shibata; Man of the Match: Bismarck

30 September 1995 2nd-13	Urawa Red Diamonds	0–2	Verdy Kawasaki	Urawa Komaba Stadium
19:04 JST (UTC+09)		J. League	Miura 46'; Bismarck 56'	Attendance: 20,938; Referee: Masayoshi Okada; Assistant referees: Toshiyuki Mayuzumi, Mitsuyoshi Nakaguma; Fourth official: Izumi Okada; Man of the Match: Tetsuji Hashiratani

4 October 1995 2nd-14	Verdy Kawasaki	4–1	Yokohama Marinos	Kawasaki Todoroki Stadium
19:04 JST (UTC+09)	T. Kikuchi 39'; Miura 76' (pen.), 81'; Alcindo 86'	J. League	Medina Bello 18'	Attendance: 18,245; Referee: Kenji Tanaka; Assistant referees: Noboru Ishiyama, Takashi Kunori; Fourth official: Michio Nakahara; Man of the Match: Alcindo

7 October 1995 2nd-15	Júbilo Iwata	2–3	Verdy Kawasaki	Júbilo Iwata Stadium
19:03 JST (UTC+09)	Nanami 33'; Matsubara 82'	J. League	Miura 56'; Alcindo 61', 79'	Attendance: 17,983; Referee: Yoshitsugu Katayama; Assistant referees: Sōichirō Kaneko, Akio Okutani; Fourth official: Takuya Okada; Man of the Match: Bismarck

14 October 1995 2nd-16	Verdy Kawasaki	2–0	JEF United Ichihara	Kawasaki Todoroki Stadium
13:03 JST (UTC+09)	Takeda 59'; Kitazawa 71'	J. League		Attendance: 17,724; Referee: Masayoshi Okada; Assistant referees: Hiroshi Fukuda, Mikio Fukuoka; Fourth official: Kanichi Takahashi; Man of the Match: Tetsuji Hashiratani

18 October 1995 2nd-17	Nagoya Grampus Eight	0–1	Verdy Kawasaki	Gifu Nagaragawa Stadium
19:03 JST (UTC+09)		J. League	Alcindo 34'	Attendance: 22,293; Referee: Zoran Petrović; Assistant referees: Yasushi Tsuchimoto, Kōji Taniuchi; Fourth official: Tatsuo Gotō; Man of the Match: Tadashi Nakamura

21 October 1995 2nd-18	Verdy Kawasaki	0–1	Kashima Antlers	Kawasaki Todoroki Stadium
15:01 JST (UTC+09)		J. League	Leonardo 58' (pen.)	Attendance: 20,974; Referee: Armando Perez; Assistant referees: Mitsuru Satō, Takuji Fukazawa; Fourth official: Kazuhiko Uchida

1 November 1995 2nd-19	Gamba Osaka	1–3	Verdy Kawasaki	Kobe Universiade Memorial Stadium
19:04 JST (UTC+09)	Y. Matsuyama 63'	J. League	Ramos 16'; Miura 54'; Takeda 78'	Attendance: 17,009; Referee: Kazuo Kakihana; Assistant referees: Kazuya Yanagisawa, Sōichirō Kaneko; Fourth official: Tsuneo Murakami; Man of the Match: Kentarō Hayashi

4 November 1995 2nd-20	Verdy Kawasaki	3–1	Shimizu S-Pulse	Kawasaki Todoroki Stadium
15:03 JST (UTC+09)	Takeda 2'; Fujiyoshi 72'; Ramos 74'	J. League	A. Santos 43'	Attendance: 21,337; Referee: Jamal Al-Sharif; Assistant referees: Hitoshi Yamada, Takeshi Ōkura; Fourth official: Takeshi Ōgiya; Man of the Match: Shinji Fujiyoshi

8 November 1995 2nd-21	Yokohama Flügels	1–4	Verdy Kawasaki	Tokyo National Stadium
19:04 JST (UTC+09)	Harada 7'	J. League	Bismarck 11'; Miura 35', 82'; Takeda 89'	Attendance: 32,876; Referee: Kiyoshi Ōta; Assistant referees: Takashi Kunori, Kenichi Koshiyama; Fourth official: Masao Yamanaka; Man of the Match: Nobuhiro Takeda

11 November 1995 2nd-22	Cerezo Osaka	1–1 (V-goal) (a.e.t.) (4–2 p)	Verdy Kawasaki	Kobe Universiade Memorial Stadium
15:04 JST (UTC+09)	Marquinhos 79' (pen.)	J. League	Miura 47'	Attendance: 35,236; Referee: Tatsumi Ōno; Assistant referees: Kazuo Kakihana, Akio Okutani; Fourth official: Keiji Hayashi
	Penalties
	(penalty scored) Minamoto; (penalty scored) Murata; (penalty missed) Yamahashi; (penalty scored) Marquinhos; (penalty scored) Fukagawa		(penalty scored) Miura; (penalty missed) Pereira; (penalty missed) Alcindo; (penalty scored) Bismarck

15 November 1995 2nd-23	Verdy Kawasaki	2–0	Kashiwa Reysol	Kawasaki Todoroki Stadium
19:04 JST (UTC+09)	Takeda 18'; Miura 80'	J. League		Attendance: 15,556; Referee: Keiichi Sunakawa; Assistant referees: Noboru Ishiyama, Akihisa Makino; Fourth official: Tasuku Onodera; Man of the Match: Junji Nishizawa

18 November 1995 2nd-24	Sanfrecce Hiroshima	3–1	Verdy Kawasaki	Hiroshima Big Arch
19:02 JST (UTC+09)	Noh 20', 73'; Takagi 38'	J. League	Miura 8'	Attendance: 20,265; Referee: Shinichirō Obata; Assistant referees: Yoshikazu Hiroshima, Mitsuyoshi Nakaguma; Fourth official: Syūji Kagawa

22 November 1995 2nd-25	Verdy Kawasaki	0–2	Urawa Red Diamonds	Kawasaki Todoroki Stadium
19:05 JST (UTC+09)		J. League	Bein 39'; Fukuda 87'	Attendance: 20,392; Referee: Jamal Al-Sharif; Assistant referees: Hiroshi Fukuda, Kenichi Koshiyama; Fourth official: Michio Nakahara

25 November 1995 2nd-26	Bellmare Hiratsuka	2–1	Verdy Kawasaki	Hiratsuka Stadium
15:00 JST (UTC+09)	Narahashi 6'; Takada 89'	J. League	Miura 34' (pen.)	Attendance: 15,294; Referee: Armando Perez; Assistant referees: Toshiyuki Mayuzumi, Naoyuki Mori; Fourth official: Susumu Takeda

==== J.League Championship ====
30 November 1995 1	Yokohama Marinos	1–0	Verdy Kawasaki	Tokyo National Stadium
19:05 JST (UTC+09)	Bisconti 48'	J. League		Attendance: 47,631; Referee: Zoran Petrović; Assistant referees: Yasuhiro Matsuzaki, Noboru Ishiyama; Fourth official: Keiichi Sunakawa

6 December 1995 2	Verdy Kawasaki	0–1 (0–2 agg.)	Yokohama Marinos	Tokyo National Stadium
19:05 JST (UTC+09)		J. League	Ihara 29'	Attendance: 48,271; Referee: Shinichirō Obata; Assistant referees: Yoshikazu Hiroshima, Hiroshi Fukuda; Fourth official: Yoshimi Ogawa

=== Emperor's Cup ===
3 December 1995 1st Round	Otsuka Pharmaceutical	0–1	Verdy Kawasaki	Ehime Matsuyama Athletic Stadium
: JST (UTC+09)			Takeda ?'

10 December 1995 2nd Round	University of Tsukuba	0–4	Verdy Kawasaki	Tottori Stadium
: JST (UTC+09)			Alcindo ?'; T. Kikuchi ?'; Nakamura ?'; Bismarck ?'

17 December 1995 Quarterfinals	Sanfrecce Hiroshima	1–0	Verdy Kawasaki	Maebashi Athletic Stadium
: JST (UTC+09)	Takagi ?'

=== Super Cup ===
11 March 1995	Bellmare Hiratsuka	2–2 (2–4 p)	Verdy Kawasaki	Tokyo National Stadium
14:03 JST (UTC+09)	Noguchi 45'; Betinho 49'	J. League	Nunobe 82'; Alcindo 85'	Attendance: 53,167; Referee: Kiyoshi Ōta; Assistant referees: Tatsumi Ōno, Noboru Ishiyama; Fourth official: Naotsugu Fuse
	Penalties
	(penalty missed) Takada; (penalty scored) Tasaka; (penalty scored) Almir; (penalty missed) Nakata		(penalty missed) Kitazawa; (penalty scored) Pereira; (penalty scored) Bismarck; (penalty scored) Alcindo; (penalty scored) Hashiratani

=== Sanwa Bank Cup ===
4 March 1995	Verdy Kawasaki	1–2	(Brazil) Grêmio	Tokyo National Stadium
15:03 JST (UTC+09)	Bismarck 82' (pen.)		Paulo Nunes 54'; Jardel 62'	Attendance: 27,038; Referee: Jindamai Russamee; Assistant referees: Yū Nakamura, Yasuhiro Matsuzaki

== International results ==
=== Asian Club Championship ===
19 September 1995 1st Round-1	(Hong Kong) Eastern	0–3	(Japan) Verdy Kawasaki	Hong Kong
			T. Kikuchi ?'; Alcindo ?', ?'

2 October 1995 1st Round-2	(Japan) Verdy Kawasaki	3–0 (6–0 agg.)	(Hong Kong) Eastern	Kawasaki, Japan
	Hironaga ?'; Takeda ?' ?' (o.g.)			Stadium: Kawasaki Todoroki Stadium

11 October 1995 2nd Round	(Japan) Verdy Kawasaki	9–1	(Pakistan) Crescent	Kawasaki, Japan
	Fujiyoshi ?', ?', ?', ?'; Takeda ?', ?', ?', ?'; Hironaga ?'		? ?'	Stadium: Kawasaki Todoroki Stadium

26 November 1995 Quarterfinals-1	(Japan) Verdy Kawasaki	3–2	(Indonesia) Persib	Bandung, Indonesia
	Nunobe ?'; Embu ?'; Ono ?'		? ?' ? ?'

28 November 1995 Quarterfinals-2	(Japan) Verdy Kawasaki	0–0	(Thailand) Thai Farmers Bank	Bandung, Indonesia

30 November 1995 Quarterfinals-3	(Japan) Verdy Kawasaki	0–1	(South Korea) Ilhwa Chunma	Bandung, Indonesia
			? ?'

== Player statistics ==
No.	Pos	Nat	Player	Total		J.League		J.League Championship		Emperor's Cup		Super Cup		Sanwa Bank Cup		Asian Club Championship	
No.	Pos	Nat	Player	Apps	Goals	Apps	Goals	Apps	Goals	Apps	Goals	Apps	Goals	Apps	Goals	Apps	Goals
	GK	(Japan) JPN	Takayuki Fujikawa	16	0	11	0	0	0	0	0	1	0	1	0	3	0
	GK	(Japan) JPN	Shinkichi Kikuchi	41	0	36	0	2	0	3	0	0	0	0	0	0	0
	GK	(Japan) JPN	Takaya Ōishi	9	0	5	0	0	0	1	0	0	0	0	0	3	0
	GK	(Japan) JPN	Hiroki Koike	0	0	0	0	0	0	0	0	0	0	0	0	0	0
	GK	(Japan) JPN	Kazuma Itō	0	0	0	0	0	0	0	0	0	0	0	0	0	0
	DF	(Brazil) BRA	Pereira	58	6	50	6	2	0	3	0	1	0	1	0	1	0
	DF	(Japan) JPN	Satoshi Tsunami	22	0	16	0	0	0	0	0	1	0	1	0	4	0
	DF	(Japan) JPN	Kō Ishikawa	32	0	27	0	0	0	1	0	1	0	1	0	2	0
	DF	(Japan) JPN	Kenichirō Tokura	23	0	21	0	0	0	1	0	0	0	0	0	1	0
	DF	(Japan) JPN	Tadashi Nakamura	48	1	42	0	2	0	2	1	1	0	1	0	0	0
	DF	(Japan) JPN	Mitsuhiro Kawamoto	0	0	0	0	0	0	0	0	0	0	0	0	0	0
	DF	(Brazil) BRA	Embu	15	1	10	0	0	0	0	0	0	0	0	0	5	1
	DF	(Japan) JPN	Toshimi Kikuchi	31	3	24	1	2	0	3	1	0	0	0	0	2	1
	DF	(Japan) JPN	Shun Suzuki	0	0	0	0	0	0	0	0	0	0	0	0	0	0
	DF	(Japan) JPN	Junji Nishizawa	14	0	8	0	2	0	1	0	0	0	0	0	3	0
	DF	(Japan) JPN	Yūji Hironaga	18	2	9	0	0	0	2	0	0	0	1	0	6	2
	DF	(Japan) JPN	Tomo Sugawara	5	1	1	1	0	0	0	0	0	0	0	0	4	0
	DF	(Japan) JPN	Tomohiro Katayama	3	0	0	0	0	0	0	0	0	0	0	0	3	0
	DF	(Japan) JPN	Yukinori Shigeta	3	0	0	0	0	0	0	0	0	0	0	0	3	0
	MF	(Japan) JPN	Ruy Ramos	24	2	23	2	1	0	0	0	0	0	0	0	0	0
	MF	(Japan) JPN	Tetsuya Totsuka	0	0	0	0	0	0	0	0	0	0	0	0	0	0
	MF	(Japan) JPN	Tetsuji Hashiratani	52	5	46	5	2	0	2	0	1	0	1	0	0	0
	MF	(Brazil) BRA	Alcindo	45	23	38	19	2	0	2	1	1	1	1	0	1	2
	MF	(Japan) JPN	Tsuyoshi Kitazawa	47	11	40	11	2	0	3	0	1	0	1	0	0	0
	MF	(Brazil) BRA	Bismarck	60	13	51	11	2	0	3	1	1	0	1	1	2	0
	MF	(Japan) JPN	Shigetoshi Hasebe	33	2	29	2	0	0	1	0	1	0	0	0	2	0
	MF	(Japan) JPN	Kentarō Hayashi	51	0	43	0	2	0	3	0	0	0	0	0	3	0
	MF	(Japan) JPN	Junichi Watanabe	15	0	11	0	0	0	0	0	0	0	0	0	4	0
	MF	(Japan) JPN	Takayuki Yamaguchi	0	0	0	0	0	0	0	0	0	0	0	0	0	0
	MF	(Japan) JPN	Shingi Ono	4	1	0	0	0	0	0	0	0	0	0	0	4	1
	MF	(Japan) JPN	Keiji Ishizuka	21	0	15	0	0	0	2	0	0	0	1	0	3	0
	MF	(Japan) JPN	Nobuyuki Zaizen	0	0	0	0	0	0	0	0	0	0	0	0	0	0
	FW	(Japan) JPN	Nobuhiro Takeda	47	26	41	20	1	0	1	1	1	0	0	0	3	5
	FW	(Japan) JPN	Shinji Fujiyoshi	25	8	17	4	0	0	3	0	1	0	1	0	3	4
	FW	(Japan) JPN	Tomohiro Hasumi	3	0	0	0	0	0	0	0	0	0	0	0	3	0
	FW	(Japan) JPN	Yoshinori Abe	0	0	0	0	0	0	0	0	0	0	0	0	0	0
	FW	(Japan) JPN	Takanori Nunobe	8	2	3	0	0	0	0	0	1	1	1	0	3	1
	FW	(Japan) JPN	Takashi Ujiie	2	0	0	0	0	0	0	0	0	0	0	0	2	0
	FW	(Japan) JPN	Mitsunori Yabuta	1	0	0	0	0	0	0	0	0	0	0	0	1	0
	FW	(Japan) JPN	Kei Hoshikawa	3	0	0	0	0	0	0	0	0	0	0	0	3	0
	MF	(Japan) JPN	Taro Ichiki †	0	0	0	0	0	0	0	0	0	0	0	0	0	0
	FW	(Japan) JPN	Kazuyoshi Miura †	30	23	26	23	2	0	2	0	0	0	0	0	0	0

- † player(s) joined the team after the opening of this season.

== Transfers ==
In:

No.	Pos.	Nation	Player
—	GK	JPN	Takaya Ōishi (from University of Tsukuba)
—	GK	JPN	Kazuma Itō (from Yomiuri S.C. youth)
—	DF	BRA	Embu (from Corinthians)
—	DF	JPN	Tomo Sugawara (from Yomiuri S.C. youth)
—	DF	JPN	Tomohiro Katayama (from Yomiuri S.C. youth)
—	DF	JPN	Yukinori Shigeta (from Yomiuri S.C. youth)
—	MF	BRA	Alcindo Sartori (from Kashima Antlers)
—	MF	JPN	Kentarō Hayashi (from Komazawa University)
—	MF	JPN	Nobuyuki Zaizen (from Yomiuri S.C. youth)
—	MF	JPN	Takayuki Yamaguchi (from Coritiba)
—	FW	JPN	Takanori Nunobe (from Hyōgo FC)
—	FW	JPN	Mitsunori Yabuta (from Yomiuri S.C. youth)
—	FW	JPN	Kei Hoshikawa (from Yomiuri S.C. youth)

Out:

No.	Pos.	Nation	Player
—	GK	JPN	Yūji Keigoshi (to Fukuoka Blux)
—	GK	JPN	Manabu Konno
—	DF	JPN	Kōichi Togashi (to Yokohama Flügels)
—	DF	JPN	Keizō Adachi
—	DF	JPN	Tatsuya Murata (to Toshiba)
—	DF	JPN	Hisashi Katō (retired)
—	MF	JPN	Yoshiyuki Katō (loan to Fukuoka Blux)
—	MF	JPN	Hideki Nagai (loan to Fukuoka Blux)
—	MF	BRA	Capitão (to Portuguesa)
—	FW	BRA	Bentinho (to São Paulo FC)

== Transfers during the season ==
=== In ===
- (Japan) Kazuyoshi Miura (loan return from Genoa on June)

=== Out ===
- (Japan) Mitsuhiro Kawamoto (to Brummel Sendai)
- (Japan) Takayuki Yamaguchi (to Brummel Sendai)
- (Japan) Yoshinori Abe (to Brummel Sendai)

== Awards ==
- J.League Best XI: (Japan) Shinkichi Kikuchi, (Japan) Tetsuji Hashiratani, (Brazil) Bismarck, (Japan) Kazuyoshi Miura

== Other pages ==
- (in Japanese) J. League official site
- (in Japanese) Tokyo Verdy official site
