= 1994 Kashima Antlers season =

Kashima Antlers
1994 season
- Chairman: 間中竣; Masaru Suzuki (June 1994)
- Manager: Masakatsu Miyamoto; Edu (July 1994)
- Stadium: Kashima Soccer Stadium
- J.League: 3rd
- Emperor's Cup: 1st Round
- J.League Cup: 1st Round
- Top goalscorer: League: Alcindo (28); All: Alcindo (28)
- Highest home attendance: 16,270 (vs Yokohama Flügels, 4 June 1994); 50,724 (vs Shimizu S-Pulse, 20 August 1994, Tokyo National Stadium)
- Lowest home attendance: 13,734 (vs Gamba Osaka, 9 April 1994)
- Average home league attendance: 16,812
Home colours	Away colours

1994 Kashima Antlers season

== Review and events ==
=== League results summary ===
Overall								Home						Away					
Pld	W	D	L	GF	GA	GD	Pts	W	D	L	GF	GA	GD	W	D	L	GF	GA	GD
44	27	0	17	89	68	+21	81	14	0	8	43	31	+12	13	0	9	46	37	+9

Source: J.LEAGUE OFFICIAL 1995 RECORD & DATA. ISBN 4-09-102317-7.

=== League results by round ===
J.League Suntory series (first stage)
Round	1	2	3	4	5	6	7	8	9	10	11	12	13	14	15	16	17	18	19	20	21	22
Ground	H	H	A	H	A	H	A	H	A	H	A	A	H	A	H	A	H	A	H	A	H	A
Result	W	W	W	W	W	L	L	W	L	W	W	L	W	W	L	L	W	W	W	W	W	W
Position	5	3	3	2	2	3	4	4	4	4	4	4	4	4	4	5	4	4	3	3	3	3

Source: J.LEAGUE OFFICIAL 1995 RECORD & DATA. ISBN 4-09-102317-7.
A = Away; H = Home; W = Win; D = Draw; L = Loss

J.League NICOS series (second stage)
Round	1	2	3	4	5	6	7	8	9	10	11	12	13	14	15	16	17	18	19	20	21	22
Ground	H	H	A	H	A	H	A	A	H	H	A	A	H	A	H	A	H	H	A	A	H	A
Result	L	L	L	L	W	W	W	W	L	W	L	L	W	L	L	W	W	L	W	W	W	L
Position	7	10	12	12	11	9	6	5	5	5	6	8	7	8	8	7	6	7	6	5	5	5

Source: J.LEAGUE OFFICIAL 1995 RECORD & DATA. ISBN 4-09-102317-7.
A = Away; H = Home; W = Win; D = Draw; L = Loss

== Competitions ==
Competitions	Position
J.League	3rd / 12 clubs
Emperor's Cup	1st round
J.League Cup	1st round

== Domestic results ==
=== J.League ===
==== Suntory series ====
12 March 1994 1st-1	Kashima Antlers	1–0	Júbilo Iwata	Kashima Soccer Stadium
15:04 JST (UTC+09)	Hasegawa 30'	J. League		Attendance: 13,990; Referee: Kiyoshi Ōta; Assistant referees: Keiichi Sunakawa, Masato Nogami; Fourth official: Ichirō Inukai; Man of the Match: Santos

16 March 1994 1st-2	Kashima Antlers	2–1 (V-goal) (a.e.t.)	Verdy Kawasaki	Kashima Soccer Stadium
19:04 JST (UTC+09)	Santos 22'; Alcindo 104'	J. League	Takeda 60'	Attendance: 14,181; Referee: Bengt Borjesson; Assistant referees: Hiroshi Fukuda, Kiyoshi Ōta; Fourth official: Ichirō Inukai; Man of the Match: Alcindo

19 March 1994 1st-3	Yokohama Marinos	0–1	Kashima Antlers	Yokohama Mitsuzawa Football Stadium
15:01 JST (UTC+09)		J. League	Alcindo 53'	Attendance: 14,055; Referee: Kiichirō Tachi; Assistant referees: Kazuaki Hamaguchi, Satoru Ishizawa; Fourth official: Yoshio Itō; Man of the Match: Alcindo

23 March 1994 1st-4	Kashima Antlers	3–2 (V-goal) (a.e.t.)	Shimizu S-Pulse	Kashima Soccer Stadium
19:03 JST (UTC+09)	Hasegawa 42' 111'; Kurosaki 85'	J. League	Toninho 5'; Horiike 9'	Attendance: 13,808; Referee: Tatsumi Ōno; Assistant referees: Yū Nakamura, Mitsuru Satō; Fourth official: Ichirō Inukai; Man of the Match: Yoshiyuki Hasegawa

26 March 1994 1st-5	JEF United Ichihara	2–3 (V-goal) (a.e.t.)	Kashima Antlers	Tokyo National Stadium
15:03 JST (UTC+09)	Otze 4', 89'	J. League	Kurosaki 7' 95'; Alcindo 60'	Attendance: 52,612; Referee: Kiyoshi Ōta; Assistant referees: Takeshi Ōkura, Hiroshi Fukuda; Fourth official: Kōji Kunō; Man of the Match: Hisashi Kurosaki

2 April 1994 1st-6	Kashima Antlers	0–2	Sanfrecce Hiroshima	Kashima Soccer Stadium
15:02 JST (UTC+09)		J. League	Takagi 33'; Noh 82'	Attendance: 14,128; Referee: Zoran Petrović; Assistant referees: Kōetsu Kikuchi, Naotsugu Fuse; Fourth official: Masao Komada

6 April 1994 1st-7	Nagoya Grampus Eight	2–1 (V-goal) (a.e.t.)	Kashima Antlers	Nagoya Mizuho Football Stadium
18:59 JST (UTC+09)	Elivélton 54'; Hirano 105'	J. League	Akita 81'	Attendance: 11,981; Referee: Shinichirō Obata; Assistant referees: Morihisa Yamaguchi, Yasushi Tsuchimoto; Fourth official: Hisao Sugata

9 April 1994 1st-8	Kashima Antlers	3–2 (V-goal) (a.e.t.)	Gamba Osaka	Kashima Soccer Stadium
15:01 JST (UTC+09)	Hasegawa 49' 96'; Hashimoto 81'	J. League	Morioka 16'; Isogai 54'	Attendance: 13,734; Referee: Bengt Borjesson; Assistant referees: Masahiro Katagiri, Masato Nogami; Fourth official: Ichirō Inukai; Man of the Match: Yasuto Honda

13 April 1994 1st-9	Yokohama Flügels	1–0 (V-goal) (a.e.t.)	Kashima Antlers	Tokyo National Stadium
19:03 JST (UTC+09)	Maeda 98'	J. League		Attendance: 50,187; Referee: Kenji Tanaka; Assistant referees: Hiroshi Fukuda, Hitoshi Yamada; Fourth official: Hideaki Ishii

16 April 1994 1st-10	Kashima Antlers	4–2	Urawa Red Diamonds	Kashima Soccer Stadium
15:01 JST (UTC+09)	Kurosaki 10'; Hasegawa 61'; Alcindo 66' (pen.), 85' (pen.)	J. League	Fukuda 82'; N. Ikeda 89'	Attendance: 14,057; Referee: Hideo Kikuchi; Assistant referees: Kazuaki Hamaguchi, Takashi Kunori; Fourth official: Ichirō Inukai; Man of the Match: Hisashi Kurosaki

23 April 1994 1st-11	Bellmare Hiratsuka	1–3	Kashima Antlers	Hiratsuka Stadium
15:01 JST (UTC+09)	Betinho 50'	J. League	Alcindo 24', 46'; Hasegawa 63'	Attendance: 14,861; Referee: Yoshimi Ogawa; Assistant referees: Kazuaki Hamaguchi, Hitoshi Yamada; Fourth official: T. Watashita (渡下 武光); Man of the Match: Shunzō Ōno

27 April 1994 1st-12	Verdy Kawasaki	3–0	Kashima Antlers	Kawasaki Todoroki Stadium
19:03 JST (UTC+09)	Bismarck 44'; Takeda 50'; Abe 52'	J. League		Attendance: 10,575; Referee: Zoran Petrović; Assistant referees: Noboru Ishiyama, Naotsugu Fuse; Fourth official: Haruo Imai

30 April 1994 1st-13	Kashima Antlers	2–1 (V-goal) (a.e.t.)	Yokohama Marinos	Kashima Soccer Stadium
15:01 JST (UTC+09)	Alcindo 25' 99'	J. League	Miura 15'	Attendance: 15,061; Referee: Masayoshi Okada; Assistant referees: Hiroshi Fukuda, Masato Nogami; Fourth official: Ichirō Inukai; Man of the Match: Alcindo

4 May 1994 1st-14	Shimizu S-Pulse	3–3 (V-goal) (a.e.t.) (3–4 p)	Kashima Antlers	Tokyo National Stadium
14:05 JST (UTC+09)	Toninho 61', 63'; Hasegawa 71'	J. League	Santos 4'; Alcindo 53', 89'	Attendance: 52,218; Referee: Zoran Petrović; Assistant referees: Hiroshi Fukuda, Masato Nogami; Fourth official: Takuji Fukazawa; Man of the Match: Alcindo
	Penalties
	(penalty scored) Toninho; (penalty missed) Sawanobori; (penalty missed) Hasegawa; (penalty scored) Iwashita; (penalty scored) Ōenoki		(penalty scored) Alcindo; (penalty scored) Manaka; (penalty scored) Ōno; (penalty missed) Ōba; (penalty scored) Santos

7 May 1994 1st-15	Kashima Antlers	1–2	JEF United Ichihara	Kashima Soccer Stadium
18:30 JST (UTC+09)	Hasegawa 50'	J. League	Otze 56', 63' (pen.)	Attendance: 15,843; Referee: Tetsuya Hamana; Assistant referees: Masahiro Katagiri, Masato Nogami; Fourth official: Ichirō Inukai

14 May 1994 1st-16	Sanfrecce Hiroshima	2–0	Kashima Antlers	Hiroshima Big Arch
15:01 JST (UTC+09)	Noh 37', 58'	J. League		Attendance: 35,108; Referee: Yoshimi Ogawa; Assistant referees: Hideaki Harada, Hiroshi Tanabe; Fourth official: Kazuyuki Tanimoto

18 May 1994 1st-17	Kashima Antlers	2–1	Nagoya Grampus Eight	Kashima Soccer Stadium
19:03 JST (UTC+09)	Santos 73'; Alcindo 77'	J. League	Moriyama 14'	Attendance: 15,578; Referee: Masayoshi Okada; Assistant referees: Yū Nakamura, Satoru Ishizawa; Fourth official: Ichirō Inukai; Man of the Match: Zico

1 June 1994 1st-18	Gamba Osaka	1–3	Kashima Antlers	Expo '70 Commemorative Stadium
: JST (UTC+09)	Aleinikov 20'	J. League	Santos 12'; Zico 53'; Yoshida 61'	Attendance: 21,624; Referee: Yōtarō Moritsu; Assistant referees: Kazuo Kakihana, Sōichirō Kaneko; Fourth official: Tsuyoshi Miyake; Man of the Match: Santos

4 June 1994 1st-19	Kashima Antlers	3–2	Yokohama Flügels	Kashima Soccer Stadium
18:32 JST (UTC+09)	Alcindo 61', 86'; Masuda 78'	J. League	Maeda 41'; Amarilla 89'	Attendance: 16,270; Referee: Tatsumi Ōno; Assistant referees: Hiroshi Fukuda, Tetsu Karakida; Fourth official: Ichirō Inukai; Man of the Match: Alcindo

8 June 1994 1st-20	Urawa Red Diamonds	1–4	Kashima Antlers	Urawa Komaba Stadium
19:01 JST (UTC+09)	Rummenigge 77' (pen.)	J. League	Hasegawa 13'; Alcindo 51', 56' (pen.); Zico 78'	Attendance: 9,674; Referee: Zoran Petrović; Assistant referees: Mitsuru Satō, Toshiyuki Mayuzumi; Fourth official: Masahisa Kajiwara; Man of the Match: Zico

11 June 1994 1st-21	Kashima Antlers	4–0	Bellmare Hiratsuka	Kashima Soccer Stadium
18:32 JST (UTC+09)	Alcindo 9', 62'; Zico 31', 73'	J. League		Attendance: 16,058; Referee: Kenji Tanaka; Assistant referees: Masahiro Katagiri, Masato Nogami; Fourth official: Ichirō Inukai; Man of the Match: Zico

15 June 1994 1st-22	Júbilo Iwata	1–2	Kashima Antlers	Júbilo Iwata Stadium
19:03 JST (UTC+09)	Vanenburg 65'	J. League	Akita 12'; Zico 21'	Attendance: 14,634; Referee: Yoshimi Ogawa; Assistant referees: Tetsu Karakida, Kazuhisa Osada; Fourth official: Toshiaki Futamata; Man of the Match: Zico

==== NICOS series ====
10 August 1994 2nd-1	Kashima Antlers	2–2 (V-goal) (a.e.t.) (2–4 p)	Júbilo Iwata	Kashima Soccer Stadium
19:03 JST (UTC+09)	Alcindo 10'; Akita 85'	J. League	Schillaci 9'; M. Suzuki 53'	Attendance: 16,153; Referee: Zoran Petrović; Assistant referees: Hiroshi Fukuda, Takashi Kunori; Fourth official: Junichi Suzuki
	Penalties
	(penalty missed) Hasegawa; (penalty scored) Akita; (penalty scored) Yoshida; (penalty missed) Kurosaki		(penalty scored) Vanenburg; (penalty scored) Date; (penalty scored) M. Yoshida; (penalty scored) Ōishi

13 August 1994 2nd-2	Kashima Antlers	2–2 (V-goal) (a.e.t.) (4–5 p)	Verdy Kawasaki	Kashima Soccer Stadium
19:04 JST (UTC+09)	Kurosaki 1'; Leonardo 37'	J. League	Hironaga 58'; Bentinho 63'	Attendance: 16,041; Referee: Hideo Kikuchi; Assistant referees: Kimio Izaki, Masato Nogami; Fourth official: Ichirō Inukai
	Penalties
	(penalty scored) Alcindo; (penalty scored) Leonardo; (penalty scored) Akita; (penalty missed) Yoshida; (penalty scored) Hasegawa; (penalty missed) Gaya		(penalty scored) Hashiratani; (penalty missed) Bismarck; (penalty scored) Ishikawa; (penalty scored) Kitazawa; (penalty scored) Bentinho; (penalty scored) Hironaga

17 August 1994 2nd-3	Yokohama Marinos	2–2 (V-goal) (a.e.t.) (4–3 p)	Kashima Antlers	Yokohama Mitsuzawa Football Stadium
19:03 JST (UTC+09)	Díaz 7'; Medina Bello 46'	J. League	Hasegawa 36', 75'	Attendance: 13,836; Referee: Yoshimi Ogawa; Assistant referees: Mitsuru Satō, Naotsugu Fuse; Fourth official: Takatoshi Itō
	Penalties
	(penalty scored) Díaz; (penalty scored) Miura; (penalty scored) Ihara; (penalty scored) Mizunuma; (penalty missed) Medina Bello		(penalty missed) Alcindo; (penalty scored) Leonardo; (penalty scored) Hasegawa; (penalty scored) Ishii; (penalty missed) Ōno

20 August 1994 2nd-4	Kashima Antlers	1–2	Shimizu S-Pulse	Tokyo National Stadium
18:00 JST (UTC+09)	Alcindo 23'	J. League	26' (o.g.); Hasegawa 71'	Attendance: 50,724; Referee: Masayoshi Okada; Assistant referees: Hiroshi Fukuda, Kōji Taniuchi; Fourth official: Hide Lii

27 August 1994 2nd-5	JEF United Ichihara	1–4	Kashima Antlers	Tochigi Utsunomiya Green Stadium
18:00 JST (UTC+09)	Ordenewitz 89' (pen.)	J. League	Alcindo 4'; Leonardo 23', 70'; Hasegawa 41'	Attendance: 18,023; Referee: Masahiro Sogawa; Assistant referees: Yū Nakamura, Satoru Ishizawa; Fourth official: Hiroshi Tezuka; Man of the Match: Edinho

31 August 1994 2nd-6	Kashima Antlers	1–0 (V-goal) (a.e.t.)	Sanfrecce Hiroshima	Kashima Soccer Stadium
: JST (UTC+09)	Hasegawa 100'	J. League		Attendance: 15,947; Referee: Kiichirō Tachi; Assistant referees: Hiroshi Fukuda, Masato Nogami; Fourth official: Ichirō Inukai; Man of the Match: Edinho

3 September 1994 2nd-7	Nagoya Grampus Eight	2–4	Kashima Antlers	Nagoya Mizuho Athletics Stadium
18:30 JST (UTC+09)	Lineker 24'; Jorginho 81'	J. League	Hasegawa 32'; Leonardo 59'; Masuda 66'; Alcindo 68'	Attendance: 21,753; Referee: Tetsuya Hamana; Assistant referees: Naoyuki Mori, Mikio Fukuoka; Fourth official: Tsuyoshi Ogura; Man of the Match: Yasuto Honda

7 September 1994 2nd-8	Gamba Osaka	0–1	Kashima Antlers	Expo '70 Commemorative Stadium
19:04 JST (UTC+09)		J. League	Leonardo 14'	Attendance: 18,887; Referee: Zoran Petrović; Assistant referees: Yoshikazu Hiroshima, Yasuhiro Matsuzaki; Fourth official: Tsuyoshi Miyake; Man of the Match: Alcindo

10 September 1994 2nd-9	Kashima Antlers	1–2	Yokohama Flügels	Kashima Soccer Stadium
19:04 JST (UTC+09)	Hasegawa 3'	J. League	Yamaguchi 16'; Maeda 42'	Attendance: 15,638; Referee: Alberto Tejada; Assistant referees: Yasuhiro Matsuzaki, Masato Nogami; Fourth official: Ichirō Inukai

14 September 1994 2nd-10	Kashima Antlers	2–0	Urawa Red Diamonds	Kashima Soccer Stadium
19:03 JST (UTC+09)	Leonardo 31' (pen.), 48'	J. League		Attendance: 15,661; Referee: Tatsumi Ōno; Assistant referees: Kazuaki Hamaguchi, Takashi Kunori; Fourth official: Ichirō Inukai; Man of the Match: Masaaki Furukawa

17 September 1994 2nd-11	Bellmare Hiratsuka	3–1	Kashima Antlers	Hiratsuka Stadium
18:32 JST (UTC+09)	Betinho 5'; Noguchi 79', 87'	J. League	Kurosaki 78'	Attendance: 15,523; Referee: Keiichi Sunakawa; Assistant referees: Masahiro Katagiri, Tetsu Karakida; Fourth official: Masaki Yoshihara

21 September 1994 2nd-12	Verdy Kawasaki	2–1	Kashima Antlers	Kawasaki Todoroki Stadium
19:04 JST (UTC+09)	Bismarck 52' (pen.), 72'	J. League	Hasegawa 76'	Attendance: 10,640; Referee: Naotsugu Fuse; Assistant referees: Noboru Ishiyama, Toshiyuki Mayuzumi; Fourth official: Takeshi Ōgiya

19 October 1994 2nd-13	Kashima Antlers	2–1	Yokohama Marinos	Kashima Soccer Stadium
19:04 JST (UTC+09)	Ishii 1'; Kurosaki 67'	J. League	Miura 77'	Attendance: 15,216; Referee: Kenji Tanaka; Assistant referees: Masato Nogami, Masahiro Katagiri; Fourth official: Ichirō Inukai; Man of the Match: Alcindo

22 October 1994 2nd-14	Shimizu S-Pulse	3–1	Kashima Antlers	Kusanagi Athletic Stadium
19:04 JST (UTC+09)	Hasegawa 26', 89'; Naitō 66'	J. League	Kurosaki 3'	Attendance: 18,160; Referee: Yoshitsugu Katayama; Assistant referees: Naoyuki Mori, Mikio Fukuoka; Fourth official: Kouzu (興津 純男)

26 October 1994 2nd-15	Kashima Antlers	0–1	JEF United Ichihara	Kashima Soccer Stadium
19:02 JST (UTC+09)		J. League	Gotō 86'	Attendance: 15,106; Referee: Masayoshi Okada; Assistant referees: Hiroshi Fukuda, Masahiro Katagiri; Fourth official: Ichirō Inukai

29 October 1994 2nd-16	Sanfrecce Hiroshima	2–4	Kashima Antlers	Hiroshima Big Arch
19:05 JST (UTC+09)	Černý 43'; Takagi 72'	J. League	Hasegawa 3'; Kurosaki 66'; Alcindo 73', 80'	Attendance: 30,621; Referee: Hiroyuki Umemoto; Assistant referees: Kazuya Yanagisawa, Kazuo Kakihana; Fourth official: Satoru Yamada; Man of the Match: Alcindo

2 November 1994 2nd-17	Kashima Antlers	3–3 (V-goal) (a.e.t.) (5–4 p)	Nagoya Grampus Eight	Kashima Soccer Stadium
19:03 JST (UTC+09)	Masuda 38', 89'; Hasegawa 53'	J. League	Moriyama 36'; Yonekura 66'; Ogura 86'	Attendance: 15,608; Referee: Keiichi Sunakawa; Assistant referees: Masato Nogami, Yasuhiro Matsuzaki; Fourth official: Ichirō Inukai; Man of the Match: Tadatoshi Masuda
	Penalties
	(penalty scored) Alcindo; (penalty scored) Kurosaki; (penalty scored) Hasegawa; (penalty scored) Manaka; (penalty scored) Honda		(penalty scored) Yonekura; (penalty missed) Hirano; (penalty scored) Ogura; (penalty scored) Stojković; (penalty scored) Fujikawa

5 November 1994 2nd-18	Kashima Antlers	1–2	Gamba Osaka	Kashima Soccer Stadium
15:01 JST (UTC+09)	Akita 89'	J. League	Morioka 16'; Isogai 87'	Attendance: 15,603; Referee: Rune Larsson; Assistant referees: Noboru Ishiyama, Takashi Kunori; Fourth official: Takao Onshi

9 November 1994 2nd-19	Yokohama Flügels	0–2	Kashima Antlers	Kagoshima Kamoike Stadium
19:04 JST (UTC+09)		J. League	Naitō 73'; Hasegawa 83'	Attendance: 13,269; Referee: Fumikazu Shioyazono; Assistant referees: Hideaki Harada, Tōru Yamashiro; Fourth official: Shōji Hamada; Man of the Match: Naoki Naitō

12 November 1994 2nd-20	Urawa Red Diamonds	2–4	Kashima Antlers	Omiya Football Stadium
14:32 JST (UTC+09)	Hirose 18', 25'	J. League	Masuda 22'; Kurosaki 63'; Alcindo 84', 89'	Attendance: 9,962; Referee: Zoran Petrović; Assistant referees: Noboru Ishiyama, Satoru Ishizawa; Fourth official: Izumi Okada; Man of the Match: Masaki Ogawa

16 November 1994 2nd-21	Kashima Antlers	3–1	Bellmare Hiratsuka	Kashima Soccer Stadium
19:03 JST (UTC+09)	Masuda 6'; Hasegawa 35'; Alcindo 41'	J. League	Edson 83'	Attendance: 15,457; Referee: Masayoshi Okada; Assistant referees: Yū Nakamura, Masahiro Katagiri; Fourth official: Ichirō Inukai; Man of the Match: Alcindo

19 November 1994 2nd-22	Júbilo Iwata	3–2	Kashima Antlers	Júbilo Iwata Stadium
15:00 JST (UTC+09)	Koga 4'; Katsuya 73'; M. Suzuki 82'	J. League	Alcindo 62'; Hasegawa 67'	Attendance: 15,346; Referee: Alberto Tejada; Assistant referees: Mikio Fukuoka, Naoki Esumi; Fourth official: Tōru Nagata

=== Emperor's Cup ===
4 December 1994 1st Round	Tokyo Gas	2–0	Kashima Antlers	Niigata Stadium
: JST (UTC+09)	Harada 48'; Amaral 89'

=== J.League Cup ===
27 July 1994 1st Round	Kashima Antlers	1–2	Urawa Red Diamonds	Kashima Soccer Stadium
18:59 JST (UTC+09)	Santos 60'	J. League	Rummenigge 56'; Mizuuchi 80'	Attendance: 16,078; Referee: Naotsugu Fuse; Assistant referees: Masahiro Katagiri, Masato Nogami; Fourth official: Atsushi Fujigasaki

== Player statistics ==
No.	Pos	Nat	Player	Total		J-League		Emperor's Cup		J-League Cup	
No.	Pos	Nat	Player	Apps	Goals	Apps	Goals	Apps	Goals	Apps	Goals
	GK	(Japan) JPN	Osamu Chiba	4	0	3	0	1	0	0	0
	GK	(Japan) JPN	Masaaki Furukawa	35	0	34	0	0	0	1	0
	GK	(Japan) JPN	Yōhei Satō	5	0	5	0	0	0	0	0
	GK	(Japan) JPN	Hideaki Ozawa	4	0	3	0	1	0	0	0
	DF	(Japan) JPN	Shunzō Ōno	30	0	29	0	0	0	1	0
	DF	(Japan) JPN	Kenji Ōba	13	0	13	0	0	0	0	0
	DF	(Japan) JPN	Ryōsuke Okuno	27	0	26	0	1	0	0	0
	DF	(Japan) JPN	Eiji Gaya	36	0	35	0	0	0	1	0
	DF	(Japan) JPN	Yutaka Akita	39	4	38	4	0	0	1	0
	DF	(Japan) JPN	Kazuhisa Irii	0	0	0	0	0	0	0	0
	DF	(Japan) JPN	Naoki Soma	30	0	28	0	1	0	1	0
	DF	(Japan) JPN	Kenichi Serata	0	0	0	0	0	0	0	0
	DF	(Japan) JPN	Ichiei Muroi	0	0	0	0	0	0	0	0
	DF	(Japan) JPN	Masafumi Mizuki	0	0	0	0	0	0	0	0
	DF	(Japan) JPN	Taijirō Kurita	4	0	3	0	1	0	0	0
	DF	(Japan) JPN	Masaki Ogawa	5	0	4	0	1	0	0	0
	DF	(Japan) JPN	Ryūzō Morioka	1	0	1	0	0	0	0	0
	MF	(Brazil) BRA	Zico	7	5	7	5	0	0	0	0
	MF	(Brazil) BRA	Santos	24	5	22	4	1	0	1	1
	MF	(Japan) JPN	Masatada Ishii	32	1	30	1	1	0	1	0
	MF	(Brazil) BRA	Alcindo	44	28	43	28	0	0	1	0
	MF	(Japan) JPN	Yasuto Honda	45	0	43	0	1	0	1	0
	MF	(Japan) JPN	Yasuhiro Yoshida	10	1	9	1	0	0	1	0
	MF	(Japan) JPN	Tadatoshi Masuda	27	6	26	6	0	0	1	0
	MF	(Japan) JPN	Tōru Oniki	0	0	0	0	0	0	0	0
	MF	(Japan) JPN	Kōji Kumagai	11	0	11	0	0	0	0	0
	FW	(Japan) JPN	Naruyuki Naitō	16	1	15	1	1	0	0	0
	FW	(Japan) JPN	Hisashi Kurosaki	31	10	30	10	0	0	1	0
	FW	(Japan) JPN	Yoshiyuki Hasegawa	44	21	43	21	1	0	0	0
	FW	(Japan) JPN	Satoshi Koga	0	0	0	0	0	0	0	0
	FW	(Japan) JPN	Yasuo Manaka	9	0	8	0	1	0	0	0
	FW	(Japan) JPN	Kenji Okamoto	0	0	0	0	0	0	0	0
	FW	(Japan) JPN	Kōji Takeda	0	0	0	0	0	0	0	0
	FW	(Japan) JPN	Masaaki Ueki	0	0	0	0	0	0	0	0
	FW	(Japan) JPN	Kenichi Hashimoto	13	1	12	1	1	0	0	0
	GK	(Japan) JPN	Tomoya Ichikawa †	0	0	0	0	0	0	0	0
	MF	(Brazil) BRA	Edinho †	19	0	19	0	0	0	0	0
	MF	(Brazil) BRA	Leonardo †	10	7	9	7	1	0	0	0

- † player(s) joined the team after the opening of this season.

== Transfers ==
In:

No.	Pos.	Nation	Player
—	DF	JPN	Naoki Soma (from Waseda University)
—	DF	JPN	Masaki Ogawa (from Shimizu Commercial High School)
—	DF	JPN	Ryūzō Morioka (from Toin Gakuen High School)
—	MF	JPN	Kōji Kumagai (from Sanbongi Agricultural High School)
—	FW	JPN	Kenichi Hashimoto (from Toin Gakuen High School)

Out:

No.	Pos.	Nation	Player
—	DF	JPN	Makoto Sugiyama
—	DF	JPN	Masami Akazawa
—	DF	JPN	Takahiro Kawaji
—	DF	JPN	Yoshikazu Fujimoto
—	MF	BRA	Carlos
—	MF	BRA	Regis

== Transfers during the season ==
=== In ===
- (Japan) Tomoya Ichikawa (from Kashima Antlers youth)
- (Brazil) Edinho (from Fluminense on March)
- (Brazil) Leonardo (from São Paulo FC on July)

=== Out ===
- (Brazil) Zico (retired on August)

== Awards ==
none

== Other pages ==
- (in Japanese) J. League official site
- (in Japanese) Kashima Antlers official site
