= Hironaga =

Hironaga (written: 廣永 or 廣長) is a Japanese surname. Notable people with the surname include:

- Ryotaro Hironaga (廣永 遼太郎, born 1990), Japanese footballer
- Yuji Hironaga (廣長 優志, born 1975), Japanese footballer
