= Mitsuhiro Kawamoto =

Japanese footballer

Mitsuhiro Kawamoto 河本 充弘
Personal information
- Full name: Mitsuhiro Kawamoto
- Date of birth: June 12, 1971 (age 55)
- Place of birth: Kanagawa, Japan
- Height: 1.76 m (5 ft 9 1/2 in)
- Position: Defender

Youth career
- Yomiuri

Senior career*
Years	Team	Apps	(Gls)
????–1995	Verdy Kawasaki		
1995	Brummell Sendai		
1996	Tosu Futures		
Medal record
Verdy Kawasaki
Winner	J1 League	1993
Winner	J1 League	1994
Runner-up	J1 League	1995
Winner	J.League Cup	1992
Winner	J.League Cup	1993
Winner	J.League Cup	1994
Runner-up	Emperor's Cup	1992
- * Club domestic league appearances and goals

Mitsuhiro Kawamoto (河本 充弘, Kawamoto Mitsuhiro; born June 12, 1971) is a former Japanese football player.

== Playing career ==
Kawamoto was born in Kanagawa Prefecture on June 12, 1971. He played for Verdy Kawasaki until 1995. Although he played many matches as right and left side back, he could not become a regular player behind Satoshi Tsunami, Tadashi Nakamura and Ko Ishikawa. From 1995, he played for Japan Football League club Brummell Sendai (1995) and Tosu Futures (1996). He retired at the end of the 1996 season.

== Club statistics ==
Club performance			League		Cup		League Cup		Total	
Season	Club	League	Apps	Goals	Apps	Goals	Apps	Goals	Apps	Goals
Japan			League		Emperor's Cup		J.League Cup		Total	
1992	Verdy Kawasaki	J1 League	-				0	0	0	0
1993	Verdy Kawasaki	J1 League	13	0	2	0	4	0	19	0
1994	Verdy Kawasaki	J1 League	13	0	0	0	0	0	13	0
1995	Verdy Kawasaki	J1 League	0	0	0	0	-		0	0
1995	Brummell Sendai	Football League								
1996	Tosu Futures	Football League								
Total			26	0	4	0	2	0	32	0
