= Kiyoshi Nakamura (footballer) =

Japanese footballer

Kiyoshi Nakamura 中村 聖
Personal information
- Full name: Kiyoshi Nakamura
- Date of birth: May 20, 1971 (age 55)
- Place of birth: Konan, Shiga, Japan
- Height: 1.76 m (5 ft 9 1/2 in)
- Position: Defender

Youth career
- 1987–1989: Moriyama High School

Senior career*
Years	Team	Apps	(Gls)
1990–1991	Toyota Motors	3	(0)
1992–1995	Shimizu S-Pulse	9	(0)
1996–1998	Ventforet Kofu	24	(0)
Total		36	(0)
Medal record
Shimizu S-Pulse
Runner-up	J.League Cup	1992
Runner-up	J.League Cup	1993
- * Club domestic league appearances and goals

Kiyoshi Nakamura (中村 聖, Nakamura Kiyoshi; born May 20, 1971) is a former Japanese football player.

== Playing career ==
Nakamura was born in Konan on May 20, 1971. After graduating from high school, he joined Toyota Motors in 1990. He debuted in first season and played in several games as mainly side back. In 1992, he moved to new club Shimizu S-Pulse. Although he played some matches in 1994, he could not play many matches. In 1996, he moved to Japan Football League club Ventforet Kofu. He played many matches in 1996 season. However his opportunity to play decreased from 1997 season and he retired at the end of the 1998 season.

== Club statistics ==
Club performance			League		Cup		League Cup		Total	
Season	Club	League	Apps	Goals	Apps	Goals	Apps	Goals	Apps	Goals
Japan			League		Emperor's Cup		J.League Cup		Total	
1990/91	Toyota Motors	JSL Division 1	20	0	2	0	-		22	0
1992	Shimizu S-Pulse	J1 League	-		0	0	0	0	0	0
1993	Shimizu S-Pulse	J1 League	0	0	0	0	0	0	0	0
1994	Shimizu S-Pulse	J1 League	9	0	0	0	1	0	10	0
1995	Shimizu S-Pulse	J1 League	0	0	0	0	-		0	0
1996	Ventforet Kofu	Football League	20	0	2	0	-		22	0
1997	Ventforet Kofu	Football League	4	0	0	0	-		4	0
1998	Ventforet Kofu	Football League	0	0	0	0	-		0	0
Total			33	0	2	0	1	0	36	0
