= Marco Aurélio (footballer, born 1972) =

Brazilian footballer

Personal information
- Full name: Marco Aurelio Silva Businhani
- Date of birth: February 8, 1972 (age 54)
- Place of birth: Bauru, Brazi
- Height: 1.82 m (6 ft 0 in)
- Position: Forward

Senior career*
Years	Team	Apps	(Gls)
1992–1993	Noroeste		
1995	Shimizu S-Pulse	14	(9)
1997	Corinthians		
1998	Juventude		
2001	Internacional		
2002	Santo André		
- * Club domestic league appearances and goals

Marco Aurélio Silva Businhani (born February 8, 1972), known as Marco Aurélio or just Marco, is a Brazilian former professional footballer who played as a forward.

== Career statistics ==
Club performance			League		Cup		Total	
Season	Club	League	Apps	Goals	Apps	Goals	Apps	Goals
Japan			League		Emperor's Cup		Total	
1995	Shimizu S-Pulse	J1 League	14	9	1	0	15	9
Total			14	9	1	0	15	9
