= Yasuhiro Yamada =

Japanese footballer

Yasuhiro Yamada 山田 泰寛
Personal information
- Full name: Yasuhiro Yamada
- Date of birth: February 13, 1968
- Place of birth: Hiroshima, Japan
- Date of death: April 8, 2013 (aged 45)
- Place of death: Shizuoka, Japan
- Height: 1.74 m (5 ft 8 1/2 in)
- Position: Defender

Youth career
- 1983–1985: Tokai University Daiichi High School
- 1986–1989: Waseda University

Senior career*
Years	Team	Apps	(Gls)
1990–1991	Yanmar Diesel	14	(0)
1992–1995	Shimizu S-Pulse	31	(0)
Total		45	(0)
Medal record
Shimizu S-Pulse
Runner-up	J.League Cup	1992
Runner-up	J.League Cup	1993
- * Club domestic league appearances and goals

Yasuhiro Yamada (山田 泰寛, Yamada Yasuhiro; February 13, 1968 – April 8, 2013) was a Japanese football player.

== Playing career ==
Yamada was born in Hiroshima on February 13, 1968. After graduating from Waseda University, he joined Yanmar Diesel in 1990. He played many matches in his first season with the team. In 1992, he moved to new club Shimizu S-Pulse. He played as left side back and the club won the 2nd place 1992 and 1993 J.League Cup. He retired end of 1995 season.

== Coaching career ==
After retirement, Yamada started coaching career at Shimizu S-Pulse in 1996. He coached youth team until 1997. In 2000, he became a manager for new university, Fuji Tokoha University. In April 2013, the university was integrated into Tokoha University and he managed Tokoha University.

On April 8, 2013, Yamada died of liver cancer in Shizuoka at the age of 45.

== Club statistics ==
Club performance			League		Cup		League Cup		Total	
Season	Club	League	Apps	Goals	Apps	Goals	Apps	Goals	Apps	Goals
Japan			League		Emperor's Cup		J.League Cup		Total	
1990/91	Yanmar Diesel	JSL Division 2	14	0					14	0
1992	Shimizu S-Pulse	J1 League	-				2	0	2	0
1993	Shimizu S-Pulse	J1 League	3	0	0	0	6	0	9	0
1994	Shimizu S-Pulse	J1 League	26	0	0	0	1	0	27	0
1995	Shimizu S-Pulse	J1 League	2	0	0	0	-		2	0
Total			45	0	0	0	9	0	54	0
