= Edinho (footballer, born 1974) =

Brazilian footballer

Personal information
- Full name: Edson Silva Martins
- Date of birth: March 16, 1974 (age 52)
- Place of birth: Rio de Janeiro, Brazil
- Height: 1.74 m (5 ft 9 in)
- Position: Midfielder

Senior career*
| Years | Team | Apps | (Gls) |
| 1994 | Kashima Antlers | 19 | (0) |
| 1997-1998 | Aris | 33 | (6) |
- * Club domestic league appearances and goals

Edoson Silva Martins (born March 16, 1974) is a former Brazilian football player.

== Club statistics ==
| Club performance | | | League | | Cup | | League Cup | | Total | |
| Season | Club | League | Apps | Goals | Apps | Goals | Apps | Goals | Apps | Goals |
| Japan | | | League | | Emperor's Cup | | J.League Cup | | Total | |
|---|---|---|---|---|---|---|---|---|---|---|
| 1994 | Kashima Antlers | J1 League | 19 | 0 | 0 | 0 | 0 | 0 | 19 | 0 |
| Total | | | 19 | 0 | 0 | 0 | 0 | 0 | 19 | 0 |
