= Toshimi Kikuchi =

Japanese footballer and manager

Toshimi Kikuchi 菊池 利三
Personal information
- Full name: Toshimi Kikuchi
- Date of birth: 17 June 1973 (age 53)
- Place of birth: Tono, Iwate, Japan
- Height: 1.78 m (5 ft 10 in)
- Position: Defender

Team information
- Current team: Iwate Grulla Morioka (assistant manager)

Youth career
- 1989–1991: Tono High School

Senior career*
Years	Team	Apps	(Gls)
1992–2002	Tokyo Verdy	68	(2)
1997	→Gamba Osaka (loan)	13	(0)
1999	→Sanfrecce Hiroshima (loan)	1	(0)
1999	→Gamba Osaka (loan)	3	(0)
2000	→Omiya Ardija (loan)	11	(0)
Total		96	(2)

Managerial career
- 2017–2019: Iwate Grulla Morioka
- 2023–2024: Reilac Shiga
Medal record
Tokyo Verdy
Winner	J1 League	1993
Winner	J1 League	1994
Runner-up	J1 League	1995
Winner	J.League Cup	1992
Winner	J.League Cup	1993
Winner	J.League Cup	1994
Runner-up	J.League Cup	1996
Winner	Emperor's Cup	1996
Runner-up	Emperor's Cup	1992
Sanfrecce Hiroshima
Runner-up	Emperor's Cup	1999
- * Club domestic league appearances and goals

Toshimi Kikuchi (菊池 利三, Kikuchi Toshimi; born July 17, 1973) is a former Japanese football player and manager. His elder brother Shinkichi Kikuchi is also a former footballer. He set to assistant manager of JFL relegated club, Iwate Grulla Morioka from 2025.

== Playing career ==
Kikuchi was born in Tono on July 17, 1973. After graduating from high school, he joined Verdy Kawasaki (later Tokyo Verdy) in 1992. His elder brother Shinkichi Kikuchi plays also in this club for a long time. In 1995, he debuted and played many matches as mainly right and left side back. The club won the 2nd place 1995 J1 League and the champions 1996 Emperor's Cup. However his opportunity to play decreased from 1996. He also played for several clubs, Gamba Osaka (1997, 1999), Sanfrecce Hiroshima (1999), Omiya Ardija (2000). He retired at the end of the 2002 season.

== Managerial career ==
After retirement, Kikuchi started coaching career at Tokyo Verdy in 2003. He mainly served coach for youth team in his local Iwate Prefecture until 2012.

In 2017, he signed with his local club, Grulla Morioka (later Iwate Grulla Morioka) in J3 League and became a manager.

On 4 September 2023, Kikuchi became official manager of JFL club, Reilac Shiga after signed as assistant manager due to Akira Teramine has replace as manager. Kikuchi left the club in 2024 after expiration contract.

On 19 December 2024, Kikuchi announce will be appointment of JFL relegated club, Iwate Grulla Morioka as assistant manager from 2025 make return former club.

== Club statistics ==
Club performance			League		Cup		League Cup		Total	
Season	Club	League	Apps	Goals	Apps	Goals	Apps	Goals	Apps	Goals
Japan			League		Emperor's Cup		J.League Cup		Total	
1992	Verdy Kawasaki	J1 League	-		0	0	0	0	0	0
1993	Verdy Kawasaki	J1 League	0	0	0	0	0	0	0	0
1994	Verdy Kawasaki	J1 League	0	0	0	0	0	0	0	0
1995	Verdy Kawasaki	J1 League	24	1	3	1	-		27	2
1996	Verdy Kawasaki	J1 League	12	0	5	0	1	0	18	0
1997	Verdy Kawasaki	J1 League	1	0	0	0	3	0	4	0
1997	Gamba Osaka	J1 League	13	0	0	0	0	0	13	0
1998	Verdy Kawasaki	J1 League	9	0	2	0	3	0	14	0
1999	Sanfrecce Hiroshima	J1 League	1	0	0	0	1	0	2	0
1999	Gamba Osaka	J1 League	3	0	1	0	0	0	4	0
2000	Omiya Ardija	J2 League	11	0	0	0	1	0	12	0
2000	Verdy Kawasaki	J1 League	5	0	2	0	2	0	9	0
2001	Tokyo Verdy	J1 League	14	1	3	0	0	0	17	1
2002	Tokyo Verdy	J1 League	3	0	0	0	1	0	4	0
Total			96	2	16	1	12	0	126	3

== Managerial statistics ==
Update; December 31, 2018

Team	From	To	Record				
Team	From	To	G	W	D	L	Win %
Iwate Grulla Morioka	2017	present	64	19	12	33	29.69
Total			64	19	12	33	29.69
