= Carlos Alberto Dias =

Brazilian football player and manager (1967–2026)

Personal information
- Full name: Carlos Alberto Costa Dias
- Date of birth: 5 May 1967
- Place of birth: Brasília, Brazil
- Date of death: 5 October 2026 (aged 59)
- Place of death: Caruaru, Pernambuco, Brazil
- Height: 1.78 m (5 ft 10 in)
- Position: Striker

Senior career*
| Years | Team | Apps | (Gls) |
| 1985 | Matsubara | | |
| 1986–1988 | Fujita Industries | | |
| 1988–1989 | Coritiba | 20 | (7) |
| 1990–1992 | Botafogo | 53 | (5) |
| 1993 | Vasco da Gama | 0 | (0) |
| 1993 | Grêmio | 4 | (2) |
| 1994 | Paraná | 15 | (5) |
| 1995 | Shimizu S-Pulse | 32 | (17) |
| 1996 | Paraná | 8 | (1) |
| 1997 | Verdy Kawasaki | 10 | (3) |
| 1998 | Coritiba | 3 | (0) |
| 1999 | Paraná | 10 | (0) |
| 2000 | Ceará | | |
| 2001 | Madureira | | |
| 2002 | Ponta Grossa | | |
| 2003 | Operário | | |
| 2004 | Shizuoka | | |
| 2005–2006 | Operário Ferroviário | | |
| 2006 | Marcílio Dias | | |

International career
| 1992 | Brazil | 1 | (0) |

Managerial career
- 2014: Castanhal
- 2017: Paragominas
- 2018: Gama
- 2026: Ypiranga-PE
- * Club domestic league appearances and goals

Carlos Alberto Costa Dias (5 May 1967 – 5 October 2026) was a Brazilian professional football player and manager. He played as a striker for clubs in Brazil and Japan. Dias was capped once for the Brazil national team, against Finland in April 1992. He died on 5 October 2026, at the age of 59.

== Career statistics ==
Appearances and goals by club, season and competition
| Club | Season | League | | |
| Club | Season | Division | Apps | Goals |
|---|---|---|---|---|
| Coritiba | 1988 | Série A | 12 | 3 |
| Coritiba | 1989 | Série A | 8 | 4 |
| Coritiba | Total | | 20 | 7 |
| Botafogo | 1990 | Série A | 17 | 0 |
| Botafogo | 1991 | Série A | 13 | 1 |
| Botafogo | 1992 | Série A | 23 | 4 |
| Botafogo | Total | | 53 | 5 |
| Vasco da Gama | 1993 | Série A | 0 | 0 |
| Grêmio | 1993 | Série A | 4 | 2 |
| Paraná | 1994 | Série A | 15 | 5 |
| Shimizu S-Pulse | 1995 | J1 League | 32 | 17 |
| Paraná | 1996 | Série A | 8 | 1 |
| Verdy Kawasaki | 1997 | J1 League | 10 | 3 |
| Coritiba | 1998 | Série A | 3 | 0 |
| Paraná | 1999 | Série A | 10 | 0 |
| Career total | | | 155 | 40 |
