= Marcelo Miguel =

Brazilian footballer

Personal information
- Full name: Marcelo Miguel Pelissari
- Date of birth: 20 August 1975 (age 51)
- Place of birth: Jandaia do Sul, Brazil
- Height: 1.82 m (5 ft 11 1/2 in)
- Position: Defender

Senior career*
Years	Team	Apps	(Gls)
1992–1995	Guarani		
1995–1996	Shimizu S-Pulse	5	(0)
1996–1999	Portuguesa	44	(1)
2000	Goiás		
2001	Paraguaçuense		
2001–2002	Malutrom		
2003	Avaí		
2003–2004	União da Madeira	26	(1)
2005	Mogi Mirim		
2005	União Barbarense		
2006	Caxias do Sul		

International career
- Brazil U20
- * Club domestic league appearances and goals

Marcelo Miguel Pelissari (born 20 August 1975) is a Brazilian former footballer who played as a defender. In club football, he played in Série A for Portuguesa, in the Portuguese Segunda Liga for União da Madeira, in the J1 League for Shimizu S-Pulse, as well as at lower levels of the Brazilian league system.

Internationally, he played for the Brazil under-20 team that won the 1995 South American U-20 Championship, where he was named in the Ideal Team of the Tournament. He captained the team that finished as runners-up at the 1995 FIFA World Youth Championship, and played in their first five matches but was suspended for the final.

== Honours ==
Brazil U20

- South American U-20 Championship winners: 1995
- FIFA World Youth Championship runners-up: 1995
