= Yasuhiro Nagahashi =

Japanese footballer

Yasuhiro Nagahashi 長橋 康弘
Personal information
- Full name: Yasuhiro Nagahashi
- Date of birth: August 2, 1975 (age 51)
- Place of birth: Fuji, Shizuoka, Japan
- Height: 1.72 m (5 ft 7 1/2 in)
- Position: Midfielder

Youth career
- 1991–1993: Shizuoka Kita High School

Senior career*
Years	Team	Apps	(Gls)
1994–1996	Shimizu S-Pulse	29	(1)
1997–2006	Kawasaki Frontale	250	(13)
Total		279	(14)
Medal record
Shimizu S-Pulse
Winner	J.League Cup	1996
Kawasaki Frontale
Runner-up	J1 League	2006
Runner-up	J.League Cup	2000
- * Club domestic league appearances and goals

Yasuhiro Nagahashi (長橋 康弘, Nagahashi Yasuhiro; born August 2, 1975) is a former Japanese football player.

== Playing career ==
Nagahashi was born in Fuji on August 2, 1975. After graduating from high school, he joined his local club Shimizu S-Pulse in 1994. He debuted and played many matches as right side midfielder in 1995. However he could not play at all in the match in 1996. In 1997, he moved to Japan Football League club Kawasaki Frontale. He became a regular player as right side midfielder. The club was promoted to J2 League in 1999 and J1 League in 2000. In 2000, the club won the 2nd place J.League Cup. However the club was relegated to J2 from 2001. In 2004, the club won the champions and was promoted to J1 from 2005. In 2006, he could hardly play in the match and retired end of 2006 season.

== Club statistics ==
Club performance			League		Cup		League Cup		Total	
Season	Club	League	Apps	Goals	Apps	Goals	Apps	Goals	Apps	Goals
Japan			League		Emperor's Cup		League Cup		Total	
1994	Shimizu S-Pulse	J1 League	0	0	0	0	0	0	0	0
1995	Shimizu S-Pulse	J1 League	29	1	1	0	-		30	1
1996	Shimizu S-Pulse	J1 League	0	0	0	0	0	0	0	0
1997	Kawasaki Frontale	Football League	22	2	1	0	-		23	2
1998	Kawasaki Frontale	Football League	24	2	3	0	1	0	28	2
1999	Kawasaki Frontale	J2 League	31	0	4	0	1	0	36	0
2000	Kawasaki Frontale	J1 League	19	1	1	0	4	0	24	1
2001	Kawasaki Frontale	J2 League	15	0	0	0	2	0	17	0
2002	Kawasaki Frontale	J2 League	34	5	3	0	-		37	5
2003	Kawasaki Frontale	J2 League	35	2	4	0	-		39	2
2004	Kawasaki Frontale	J2 League	36	0	2	0	-		38	0
2005	Kawasaki Frontale	J1 League	31	1	1	0	5	0	37	1
2006	Kawasaki Frontale	J1 League	3	0	0	0	1	0	4	0
Career total			279	14	20	0	14	0	313	14
