= Tomoya Ichikawa =

Japanese baseball player (born 1985)

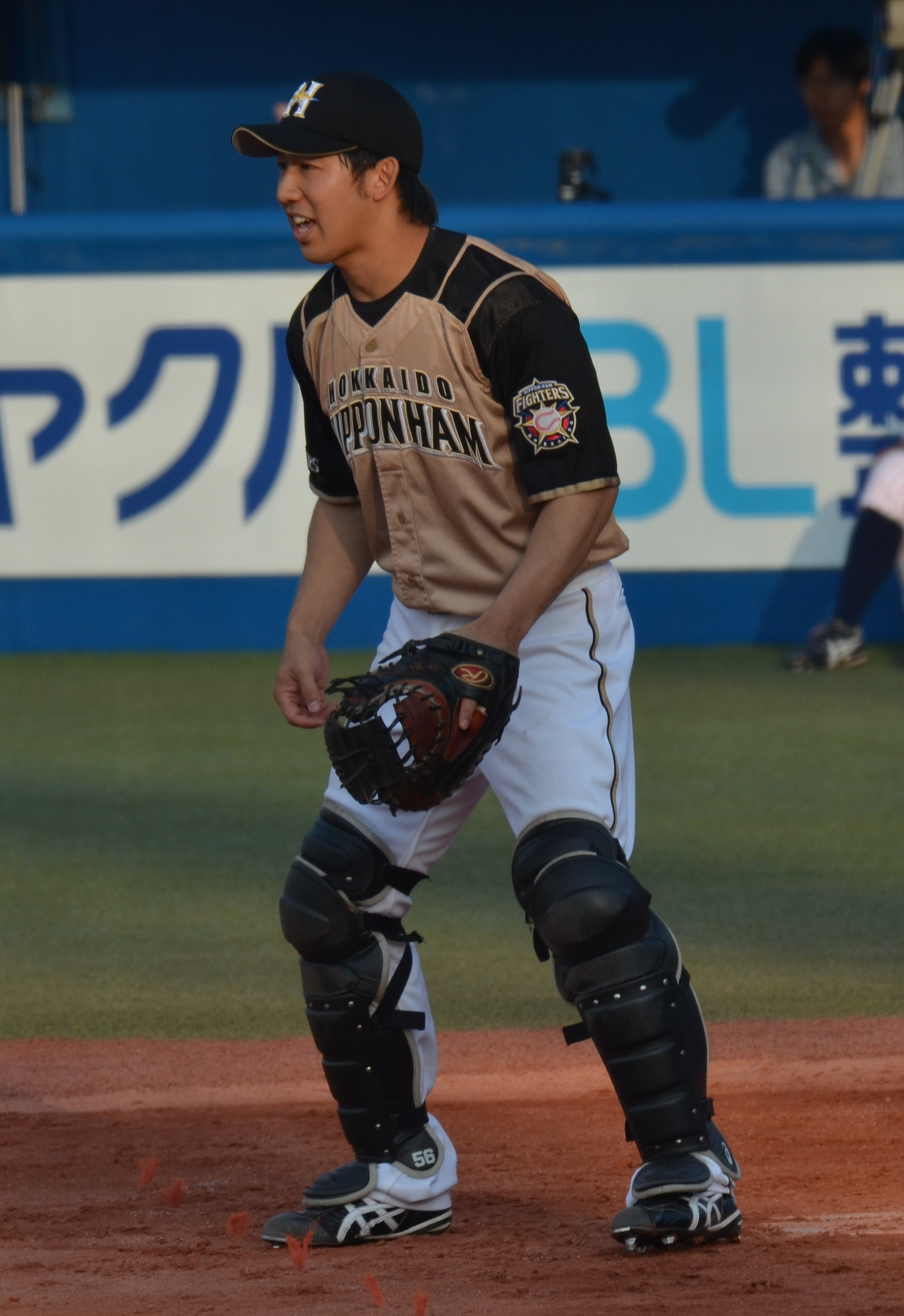
- Ichikawa with the Hokkaido Nippon-Ham Fighters

Yomiuri Giants – No. 102
- Catcher / Coach
- Born: May 9, 1985 (age 40); Sagamihara, Kanagawa, Japan
- Batted: Right Threw: Right

NPB debut
- April 1, 2010, for the Yomiuri Giants

Last NPB appearance
- August 4, 2018, for the Fukuoka SoftBank Hawks

NPB statistics (through 2019 season)
- Batting average: .199
- Hits: 112
- Home runs: 8
- RBIs: 47
- Stolen bases: 1
- Stats at Baseball Reference

Teams
- As player: Yomiuri Giants (2010–2013); Hokkaido Nippon-Ham Fighters (2014–2018); Fukuoka SoftBank Hawks (2018–2019); AS coach: Yomiuri Giants (2022-present)

Tomoya Ichikawa (市川 友也, Ichikawa Tomoya; born May 9, 1985) is a professional Japanese baseball player. He plays catcher for the Fukuoka SoftBank Hawks.
