= Yuji Hironaga =

Japanese footballer

Yuji Hironaga 廣長 優志
Personal information
- Full name: Yuji Hironaga
- Date of birth: 25 July 1975 (age 51)
- Place of birth: Osaka, Japan
- Height: 1.81 m (5 ft 11 1/2 in)
- Position: Midfielder

Youth career
- 1991–1993: Toin Gakuen High School

Senior career*
Years	Team	Apps	(Gls)
1994–2001	Tokyo Verdy	91	(3)
1998–1999	→Gamba Osaka (loan)	33	(4)
2002	Yokohama FC	32	(5)
2003–2004	Cerezo Osaka	19	(0)
Total		175	(12)

International career
1996	Japan U-23	2	(0)
Medal record
Tokyo Verdy
Winner	J1 League	1994
Runner-up	J1 League	1995
Winner	J.League Cup	1994
Runner-up	J.League Cup	1996
Winner	Emperor's Cup	1996
Cerezo Osaka
Runner-up	Emperor's Cup	2003
- * Club domestic league appearances and goals

Yuji Hironaga (廣長 優志, Hironaga Yūji; born 25 July 1975) is a former Japanese football player.

== Club career ==
Hironaga was born in Osaka Prefecture on 25 July 1975. After graduating from high school, he joined Verdy Kawasaki (later Tokyo Verdy) in 1994. He played as defensive midfielder and center back. In 1994, the club won the championships for the J1 League and J.League Cup. He then moved to his local club Gamba Osaka. He played many matches at Gamba, and returned to Verdy in June 1999. He played as a forward as well as a midfielder. His opportunity to play decreased in 2001 and he moved to the J2 League club Yokohama FC. He played many matches as defensive midfielder. He moved to Cerezo Osaka in 2003. He retired at the end of the 2004 season.

== National team career ==
In July 1996, Hironaga was selected Japan U-23 national team for 1996 Summer Olympics. At this tournament, he played 2 matches as defensive midfielder. Although Japan won 2 matches, Japan lost at First round. At this time, Japan won Brazil in first game. It was known as "Miracle of Miami" (マイアミの奇跡) in Japan.

== Career statistics ==
Appearances and goals by club, season and competition
Club	Season	League			Emperor's Cup		J.League Cup		Total	
Club	Season	Division	Apps	Goals	Apps	Goals	Apps	Goals	Apps	Goals
Verdy Kawasaki	1994	J1 League	18	1	2	0	3	0	23	1
Verdy Kawasaki	1995	J1 League	9	0	2	0	—		11	0
Verdy Kawasaki	1996	J1 League	8	0	0	0	4	0	12	0
Verdy Kawasaki	1997	J1 League	18	0	1	0	5	0	24	0
Gamba Osaka	1998	J1 League	26	3	1	1	2	0	29	4
Gamba Osaka	1999	J1 League	7	1	0	0	4	0	11	1
Verdy Kawasaki	1999	J1 League	5	0	0	0	0	0	5	0
Verdy Kawasaki	2000	J1 League	24	2	2	0	3	1	29	3
Tokyo Verdy	2001	J1 League	9	0	0	0	2	0	11	0
Yokohama FC	2002	J2 League	32	5	3	0	—		35	5
Cerezo Osaka	2003	J1 League	19	0	0	0	3	0	22	0
Cerezo Osaka	2004	J1 League	0	0	0	0	0	0	0	0
Career total			175	12	11	1	26	1	212	14
