= 1996 J.League Cup final =

Shimizu S-Pulse	Verdy Kawasaki
3	3
- Shimizu S-Pulse won 5–4 on penalties
- Date: September 25, 1996
- Venue: National Stadium, Tokyo

The 1996 J.League Cup final was the 4th final of the J.League Cup competition. The final was played at National Stadium in Tokyo on September 25, 1996. Shimizu S-Pulse won the championship.

== Match details ==
September 25, 1996

Shimizu S-Pulse	3–3	Verdy Kawasaki
Kenta Hasegawa 68'; Oliva 81'; Santos 90'	Report	87' (o.g.); Argel 89'; Bismarck 105'
Penalties
	5–4

National Stadium

Shimizu S-Pulse
GK	1	(Japan) Masanori Sanada
DF	3	(Japan) Masahiro Ando
DF	11	(Japan) Ryuzo Morioka
DF	2	(Japan) Toshihide Saito
DF	4	(Japan) Takumi Horiike
MF	8	(Argentina) Oliva
MF	5	(Brazil) Santos
MF	7	(Japan) Hideki Nagai	(substituted off) 100'
MF	6	(Japan) Katsumi Oenoki
MF	10	(Japan) Masaaki Sawanobori
FW	9	(Japan) Kenta Hasegawa
Substitutes:
GK	16	(Japan) Koji Nakahara
DF	12	(Japan) Hiroyuki Shirai	(substituted on) 100'
MF	14	(Japan) Teruyoshi Ito
MF	13	(Japan) Kazuyuki Toda
FW	15	(Japan) Tatsuru Mukojima
Manager:
(Argentina) Ardiles

Verdy Kawasaki
GK	1	(Japan) Shinkichi Kikuchi
DF	2	(Japan) Ko Ishikawa	(substituted off) 81'
DF	6	(Japan) Tadashi Nakamura	(substituted off) 75'
DF	10	(Japan) Tomo Sugawara
DF	3	(Brazil) Argel
DF	5	(Japan) Tetsuji Hashiratani
MF	7	(Brazil) Bismarck
MF	8	(Japan) Tsuyoshi Kitazawa
MF	4	(Japan) Yasutoshi Miura	(substituted off) 86'
FW	11	(Japan) Kazuyoshi Miura
FW	9	(Brazil) Magrao
Substitutes:
GK	16	(Japan) Takaya Oishi
DF	13	(Japan) Toshimi Kikuchi	(substituted on) 81'
DF	12	(Japan) Junji Nishizawa	(substituted on) 86'
FW	15	(Japan) Takanori Nunobe
FW	14	(South Korea) Shintetsu Gen	(substituted on) 75'
Manager:
(Brazil) Leao

== See also ==
- 1996 J.League Cup
