= 1997 Shimizu S-Pulse season =

Shimizu S-Pulse
1997 season
- Manager: Ardiles
- Stadium: Nihondaira Sports Stadium
- J.League: 5th
- Emperor's Cup: Quarterfinals
- J.League Cup: GL-A 2nd
- Top goalscorer: Oliva (13)
Home colours	Away colours

The 1997 season was Shimizu S-Pulse's sixth season in existence and their fifth season in the J1 League. The club also competed in the Emperor's Cup and the J.League Cup. The team finished the season fifth in the league.

== Competitions ==
Competitions	Position
J.League	5th / 17 clubs
Emperor's Cup	Quarterfinals
J.League Cup	GL-A 2nd / 4 clubs

== Domestic results ==
=== J.League ===
12 April 1997 1-1	Kashiwa Reysol	0-1	Shimizu S-Pulse	Tokyo National Stadium
JST (UTC+09)

16 April 1997 1-2	Shimizu S-Pulse	0-1	Urawa Red Diamonds	Nihondaira Sports Stadium
JST (UTC+09)

19 April 1997 1-3	Gamba Osaka	4-1	Shimizu S-Pulse	Osaka Expo '70 Stadium
JST (UTC+09)

23 April 1997 1-4	Shimizu S-Pulse	2-1 (GG) (a.e.t.)	Verdy Kawasaki	Nihondaira Sports Stadium
JST (UTC+09)

26 April 1997 1-5	Kyoto Purple Sanga	1-3	Shimizu S-Pulse	Nishikyogoku Athletic Stadium
JST (UTC+09)

3 May 1997 1-6	Shimizu S-Pulse	2-1	JEF United Ichihara	Nihondaira Sports Stadium
JST (UTC+09)

7 May 1997 1-7	Bellmare Hiratsuka	1-2	Shimizu S-Pulse	Tokyo National Stadium
JST (UTC+09)

10 May 1997 1-8	Shimizu S-Pulse	1-2 (GG) (a.e.t.)	Yokohama Marinos	Nihondaira Sports Stadium
JST (UTC+09)

1-9	bye

24 May 1997 1-10	Sanfrecce Hiroshima	1-0	Shimizu S-Pulse	Ehime Matsuyama Athletic Stadium
JST (UTC+09)

28 May 1997 1-11	Shimizu S-Pulse	1-0	Avispa Fukuoka	Nihondaira Sports Stadium
JST (UTC+09)

31 May 1997 1-12	Cerezo Osaka	1-2 (GG) (a.e.t.)	Shimizu S-Pulse	Osaka Nagai Stadium
JST (UTC+09)

5 July 1997 1-13	Shimizu S-Pulse	2-4	Vissel Kobe	Nihondaira Sports Stadium
JST (UTC+09)

9 July 1997 1-14	Kashima Antlers	0-1	Shimizu S-Pulse	Kashima Soccer Stadium
JST (UTC+09)

12 July 1997 1-15	Shimizu S-Pulse	3-1	Nagoya Grampus Eight	Nihondaira Sports Stadium
JST (UTC+09)

16 July 1997 1-16	Yokohama Flügels	4-3 (GG) (a.e.t.)	Shimizu S-Pulse	Yokohama Mitsuzawa Stadium
JST (UTC+09)

19 July 1997 1-17	Shimizu S-Pulse	1-2	Júbilo Iwata	Nihondaira Sports Stadium
JST (UTC+09)

30 July 1997 2-1	Shimizu S-Pulse	3-1	Yokohama Flügels	Nihondaira Sports Stadium
JST (UTC+09)

2 August 1997 2-2	Shimizu S-Pulse	2-3 (GG) (a.e.t.)	Kashiwa Reysol	Nihondaira Sports Stadium
JST (UTC+09)

6 August 1997 2-3	Urawa Red Diamonds	3-4	Shimizu S-Pulse	Urawa Komaba Stadium
JST (UTC+09)

9 August 1997 2-4	Shimizu S-Pulse	1-2	Gamba Osaka	Nihondaira Sports Stadium
JST (UTC+09)

16 August 1997 2-5	Verdy Kawasaki	1-0 (GG) (a.e.t.)	Shimizu S-Pulse	Todoroki Athletics Stadium
JST (UTC+09)

20 August 1997 2-6	Shimizu S-Pulse	1-0	Kyoto Purple Sanga	Nihondaira Sports Stadium
JST (UTC+09)

23 August 1997 2-7	JEF United Ichihara	0-3	Shimizu S-Pulse	Ichihara Seaside Stadium
JST (UTC+09)

30 August 1997 2-8	Shimizu S-Pulse	3-1	Bellmare Hiratsuka	Nihondaira Sports Stadium
JST (UTC+09)

3 September 1997 2-9	Yokohama Marinos	1-0 (GG) (a.e.t.)	Shimizu S-Pulse	Yokohama Mitsuzawa Stadium
JST (UTC+09)

2-10	bye

10 September 1997 2-11	Nagoya Grampus Eight	2-1	Shimizu S-Pulse	Mizuho Athletic Stadium
JST (UTC+09)

13 September 1997 2-12	Shimizu S-Pulse	1-0	Sanfrecce Hiroshima	Nihondaira Sports Stadium
JST (UTC+09)

20 September 1997 2-13	Shimizu S-Pulse	2-0	Cerezo Osaka	Nihondaira Sports Stadium
JST (UTC+09)

24 September 1997 2-14	Avispa Fukuoka	0-1 (GG) (a.e.t.)	Shimizu S-Pulse	Hakatanomori Football Stadium
JST (UTC+09)

27 September 1997 2-15	Vissel Kobe	0-3	Shimizu S-Pulse	Kobe Universiade Memorial Stadium
JST (UTC+09)

1 October 1997 2-16	Shimizu S-Pulse	2-0	Kashima Antlers	Nihondaira Sports Stadium
JST (UTC+09)

4 October 1997 2-17	Júbilo Iwata	2-0	Shimizu S-Pulse	Júbilo Iwata Stadium
JST (UTC+09)

=== Emperor's Cup ===
1st Round	bye

2nd Round	bye

14 December 1997 3rd Round	Shimizu S-Pulse	3-0	F.C. Fukushima	Nihondaira Sports Stadium
JST (UTC+09)

20 December 1997 4th Round	Shimizu S-Pulse	3-1	Sanfrecce Hiroshima	Tochigi Green Stadium
JST (UTC+09)

23 December 1997 Quarterfinals	Shimizu S-Pulse	1-6	Yokohama Flügels	Ehime Matsuyama Athletic Stadium
JST (UTC+09)

=== J.League Cup ===
8 March 1997 GL-A-1	Shimizu S-Pulse	0-0	Bellmare Hiratsuka	Nihondaira Sports Stadium
JST (UTC+09)

15 March 1997 GL-A-2	Brummell Sendai	0-2	Shimizu S-Pulse	Miyagi Athletic Stadium
JST (UTC+09)

19 March 1997 GL-A-3	Shimizu S-Pulse	2-0	JEF United Ichihara	Nihondaira Sports Stadium
JST (UTC+09)

22 March 1997 GL-A-4	Shimizu S-Pulse	1-1	Brummell Sendai	Nihondaira Sports Stadium
JST (UTC+09)

26 March 1997 GL-A-5	JEF United Ichihara	3-0	Shimizu S-Pulse	Ichihara Seaside Stadium
JST (UTC+09)

29 March 1997 GL-A-6	Bellmare Hiratsuka	2-2	Shimizu S-Pulse	Hiratsuka Athletics Stadium
JST (UTC+09)

== Player statistics ==
No.	Pos.	Nat.	Player	D.o.B. (Age)	Height / Weight	J.League		Emperor's Cup		J.League Cup		Total	
No.	Pos.	Nat.	Player	D.o.B. (Age)	Height / Weight	Apps	Goals	Apps	Goals	Apps	Goals	Apps	Goals
1	GK	(Japan)	Masanori Sanada	March 6, 1968 (aged 29)	178 cm / 73 kg	32	0	3	0	6	0	41	0
2	DF	(Japan)	Toshihide Saito	April 20, 1973 (aged 23)	181 cm / 73 kg	22	2	3	0	0	0	25	2
3	DF	(Japan)	Masahiro Ando	April 2, 1972 (aged 24)	176 cm / 67 kg	32	2	3	0	6	0	41	2
4	DF	(Japan)	Takumi Horiike	September 6, 1965 (aged 31)	173 cm / 68 kg	29	0	0	0	6	0	35	0
5	MF	(Brazil)	Santos	December 9, 1960 (aged 36)	176 cm / 74 kg	31	3	3	3	6	0	40	6
6	MF	(Japan)	Katsumi Oenoki	April 3, 1965 (aged 31)	178 cm / 70 kg	28	0	3	0	5	0	36	0
7	MF	(Japan)	Teruyoshi Ito	August 31, 1974 (aged 22)	168 cm / 71 kg	31	7	3	1	6	1	40	9
8	MF	(Argentina)	Oliva	September 26, 1971 (aged 25)	180 cm / 80 kg	22	13	3	2	5	2	30	17
9	FW	(Japan)	Kenta Hasegawa	September 25, 1965 (aged 31)	177 cm / 77 kg	30	5	1	0	6	2	37	7
10	MF	(Japan)	Masaaki Sawanobori	January 12, 1970 (aged 27)	170 cm / 60 kg	31	11	3	1	6	0	40	12
11	DF	(Japan)	Ryuzo Morioka	October 7, 1975 (aged 21)	179 cm / 70 kg	30	1	3	0	6	0	39	1
12	MF	(Japan)	Yukihiko Sato	May 11, 1976 (aged 20)	177 cm / 70 kg	0	0	1	0	2	0	3	0
13	DF	(Japan)	Tadaaki Matsubara	July 2, 1977 (aged 19)	182 cm / 74 kg	0	0		0	0	0		0
14	DF	(Japan)	Kazuyuki Toda	December 30, 1977 (aged 19)	178 cm / 68 kg	20	0	3	0	5	0	28	0
15	DF	(Japan)	Ryo Oishi	July 13, 1977 (aged 19)	177 cm / 70 kg	2	0	0	0	0	0	2	0
16	GK	(Japan)	Koji Nakahara	July 27, 1970 (aged 26)	178 cm / 76 kg	0	0		0	0	0		0
17	MF	(Japan)	Yuzuki Ito	April 7, 1974 (aged 22)	172 cm / 65 kg	6	0	0	0	4	0	10	0
18	FW	(Japan)	Daizo Okitsu	June 15, 1974 (aged 22)	170 cm / 68 kg	17	1	0	0	0	0	17	1
19	DF	(Japan)	Junji Nishizawa	May 10, 1974 (aged 22)	181 cm / 77 kg	21	0	3	0	1	0	25	0
20	GK	(Japan)	Keisuke Hada	February 20, 1978 (aged 19)	182 cm / 75 kg	0	0		0	0	0		0
21	MF	(Japan)	Nobuhiro Naito	May 25, 1978 (aged 18)	164 cm / 60 kg	0	0		0	1	0		0
22	MF	(Japan)	Hisaaki Kobayashi	September 20, 1978 (aged 18)	171 cm / 65 kg	0	0		0	0	0		0
23	MF/DF	(Brazil)	Alex	July 20, 1977 (aged 19)	178 cm / 69 kg	27	3	3	0	2	1	32	4
	DF	(Japan)	Tsuyoshi Tanikawa	April 25, 1980 (aged 16)	175 cm / 70 kg	0	0		0	0	0		0
→24	DF	(Japan)	Daisuke Ichikawa	May 14, 1980 (aged 16)	181 cm / 70 kg	0	0		0	0	0		0
	DF	(Japan)	Yuzo Wada	May 2, 1980 (aged 16)	172 cm / 63 kg	0	0		0	0	0		0
	MF	(Japan)	Kosuke Watanabe	July 16, 1979 (aged 17)	165 cm / 60 kg	0	0		0	0	0		0
	MF	(Japan)	Kohei Hiramatsu	April 19, 1980 (aged 16)	171 cm / 60 kg	0	0		0	0	0		0
24	DF	(Wales)	Bowen †	December 7, 1963 (aged 33)	178 cm / 75 kg	7	3	0	0	3	1	10	4

- † player(s) joined the team after the opening of this season.

== Transfers ==
In:

No.	Pos.	Nation	Player
19	DF	JPN	Junji Nishizawa (from Verdy Kawasaki)
—	DF	JPN	Tsuyoshi Tanikawa (from Shimizu S-Pulse youth)
—	DF	JPN	Daisuke Ichikawa (from Shimizu S-Pulse youth)
—	DF	JPN	Yuzo Wada (from Shimizu S-Pulse youth)
—	MF	JPN	Kosuke Watanabe (from Shimizu S-Pulse youth)
—	MF	JPN	Kohei Hiramatsu (from Shimizu S-Pulse youth)
21	MF	JPN	Nobuhiro Naito (from Shizuoka Gakuen Senior High School)
22	MF	JPN	Hisaaki Kobayashi (from Shimizu Commercial High School)
23	MF	BRA	Alex (from Meitoku Gijuku Senior High School)
18	FW	JPN	Daizo Okitsu (from University of Tsukuba)

Out:

No.	Pos.	Nation	Player
—	GK	JPN	Takeshi Urakami (to Kawasaki Frontale)
—	DF	JPN	Hiroyuki Shirai (to Verdy Kawasaki)
—	DF	JPN	Shinichi Niimura (to Hitachi Shimizu)
—	MF	JPN	Masao Sugimoto (retired)
—	MF	JPN	Ademir Santos
—	MF	JPN	Hideki Nagai (to Verdy Kawasaki)
—	MF	JPN	Noriaki Suzuki
—	MF	JPN	Yasuhiro Nagahashi (to Kawasaki Frontale)
—	FW	ITA	Massaro
—	FW	JPN	Tatsuru Mukojima (to Kawasaki Frontale)
—	FW	JPN	Hiroaki Tajima (to Honda Motor)
—	FW	JPN	Yoshika Matsubara (to JEF United Ichihara)
—	FW	JPN	Ryuzo Shimizu (retired)
—	FW	JPN	Hiroki Matsubara

== Transfers during the season ==
=== In ===
- (Wales) Mark Rossllyn Bowen (on March)

=== Out ===
- (Wales) Mark Rossllyn Bowen (on September)

== Awards ==
none

== Other pages ==
- (in Japanese) J. League official site
- (in Japanese) Shimizu S-Pulse official site
