= Masahiro Ando =

Masahiro Ando, Masahiro Andoh or Masahiro Andō may refer to:

- Masahiro Andō (animator), Japanese animator for the television series Sirius the Jaeger
- Masahiro Andō (director), Japanese anime director for the television series Hanasaku Iroha
- Masahiro Ando (footballer) (born 1972), Japanese footballer
- Masahiro Andoh (born 1954), Japanese musician
