= Keisuke Hada =

Japanese footballer

Keisuke Hada 羽田 敬介
Personal information
- Full name: Keisuke Hada
- Date of birth: February 20, 1978 (age 48)
- Place of birth: Ainan, Ehime, Japan
- Height: 1.82 m (5 ft 11 1/2 in)
- Position: Goalkeeper

Youth career
- 1993–1995: Minamiuwa High School

Senior career*
Years	Team	Apps	(Gls)
1996–2003	Shimizu S-Pulse	26	(0)
2004	Cerezo Osaka	4	(0)
2005–2007	Ehime FC	42	(0)
Total		72	(0)
Medal record
Shimizu S-Pulse
Runner-up	J1 League	1999
Winner	J.League Cup	1996
Winner	Emperor's Cup	2001
Runner-up	Emperor's Cup	1998
Runner-up	Emperor's Cup	2000
- * Club domestic league appearances and goals

Keisuke Hada (羽田 敬介, Hada Keisuke; born February 20, 1982) is a former Japanese football player.

== Playing career ==
Hada was born in Ainan, Ehime on February 20, 1982. After graduating from high school, he joined J1 League club Shimizu S-Pulse in 1996. However he could not play at all in the match behind Masanori Sanada until 2000. From 2001, he battles with newcomer Takaya Kurokawa for the position. Although he played many matches in 2001, his opportunity to play decreased behind Kurokawa from 2002. In 2004, he moved to Cerezo Osaka. However he could not play many matches behind Tomohiko Ito. In 2005, he moved to his local club Ehime FC in Japan Football League. He became a regular goalkeeper and played in all matches in 2005 season. The club also won the champions and was promoted to J2 League from 2006. However his opportunity to play decreased from 2006 season and retired end of 2007 season.

== Club statistics ==
Club performance			League		Cup		League Cup		Continental		Total	
Season	Club	League	Apps	Goals	Apps	Goals	Apps	Goals	Apps	Goals	Apps	Goals
Japan			League		Emperor's Cup		League Cup		Asia		Total	
1996	Shimizu S-Pulse	J1 League	0	0	0	0	0	0	-		0	0
1997	Shimizu S-Pulse	J1 League	0	0	0	0	0	0	-		0	0
1998	Shimizu S-Pulse	J1 League	0	0	0	0	0	0	-		0	0
1999	Shimizu S-Pulse	J1 League	0	0	0	0	0	0	-		0	0
2000	Shimizu S-Pulse	J1 League	0	0	0	0	0	0	-		0	0
2001	Shimizu S-Pulse	J1 League	18	0	0	0	1	0	-		19	0
2002	Shimizu S-Pulse	J1 League	6	0	3	0	3	0	3	0	15	0
2003	Shimizu S-Pulse	J1 League	2	0	0	0	0	0	3	0	5	0
2004	Cerezo Osaka	J1 League	4	0	0	0	2	0	-		6	0
2005	Ehime FC	Football League	30	0	2	0	-		-		32	0
2006	Ehime FC	J2 League	10	0	0	0	-		-		10	0
2007	Ehime FC	J2 League	2	0	0	0	-		-		2	0
Career total			70	0	5	0	6	0	6	0	87	0
