= Makoto Sugiyama =

Japanese footballer

Makoto Sugiyama 杉山 誠
Personal information
- Full name: Makoto Sugiyama
- Date of birth: May 17, 1960 (age 66)
- Place of birth: Fujieda, Shizuoka, Japan
- Height: 1.80 m (5 ft 11 in)
- Position: Defender

Youth career
- 1976–1978: Shizuoka Gakuen High School
- 1979–1982: Tokyo University of Agriculture

Senior career*
Years	Team	Apps	(Gls)
1983–1991	Nissan Motors	130	(0)
1991–1993	Kashima Antlers	55	(1)
1994–1996	Kyoto Purple Sanga	41	(1)
Total		226	(2)
Medal record
Nissan Motors
Winner	Japan Soccer League	1988/89
Winner	Japan Soccer League	1989/90
Runner-up	Japan Soccer League	1983
Runner-up	Japan Soccer League	1984
Runner-up	Japan Soccer League	1990/91
Winner	JSL Cup	1988
Winner	JSL Cup	1989
Winner	JSL Cup	1990
Runner-up	JSL Cup	1983
Runner-up	JSL Cup	1985
Runner-up	JSL Cup	1986
Winner	Emperor's Cup	1983
Winner	Emperor's Cup	1985
Winner	Emperor's Cup	1988
Winner	Emperor's Cup	1989
Runner-up	Emperor's Cup	1990
Kashima Antlers
Runner-up	J1 League	1993
Runner-up	Emperor's Cup	1993
- * Club domestic league appearances and goals

Makoto Sugiyama (杉山 誠, Sugiyama Makoto; born May 17, 1960) is a former Japanese football player.

== Club career ==
Sugiyama was born in Fujieda on May 17, 1960. After graduating from Tokyo University of Agriculture, he joined Japan Soccer League club Nissan Motors in 1983. He played as regular player from first season and the club won the champions 1983 and 1985 Emperor's Cup. From 1988 to 1990, the club won all three major title in Japan; Japan Soccer League, JSL Cup and Emperor's Cup for 2 years in a row. The club also won the champions 1990 JSL Cup. He moved to Division 2 club Sumitomo Metal (later Kashima Antlers) in 1991. In 1992, Japan Soccer League was folded and founded new league J1 League. The club won the 2nd place 1993 J1 League and 1993 Emperor's Cup. He moved to Japan Football League club Kyoto Purple Sanga in 1994. In 1995, although his opportunity to play decreased, the club won the 2nd place and was promoted to J1 League. He retired end of 1996 season.

== National team career ==
In August 1979, when Sugiyama was a Tokyo University of Agriculture student, he was selected Japan U-20 national team for 1995 World Youth Championship. But he did not play in the match.

== Club statistics ==
Club performance			League		Cup		League Cup		Total	
Season	Club	League	Apps	Goals	Apps	Goals	Apps	Goals	Apps	Goals
Japan			League		Emperor's Cup		J.League Cup		Total	
1983	Nissan Motors	JSL Division 1	15	0					15	0
1984	Nissan Motors	JSL Division 1	18	0					18	0
1985/86	Nissan Motors	JSL Division 1	19	0					19	0
1986/87	Nissan Motors	JSL Division 1								
1987/88	Nissan Motors	JSL Division 1								
1988/89	Nissan Motors	JSL Division 1	10	0					10	0
1989/90	Nissan Motors	JSL Division 1	20	0			4	0	24	0
1990/91	Nissan Motors	JSL Division 1	18	0			0	0	18	0
1991/92	Sumitomo Metal	JSL Division 2	29	1	-		1	0	30	1
1992	Kashima Antlers	J1 League	-		2	0	9	0	11	0
1993	Kashima Antlers	J1 League	26	0	0	0	6	0	32	0
1994	Kyoto Purple Sanga	Football League	26	1	3	0	-		29	1
1995	Kyoto Purple Sanga	Football League	12	0	0	0	-		12	0
1996	Kyoto Purple Sanga	J1 League	3	0	0	0	2	0	5	0
Total			196	2	5	0	22	0	223	2
