= 1996 Shimizu S-Pulse season =

Shimizu S-Pulse
1996 season
- Manager: Ardiles
- Stadium: Nihondaira Sports Stadium
- J.League: 10th
- Emperor's Cup: Quarterfinals
- J.League Cup: Champions
- Suntory Cup: Semifinals
- Top goalscorer: Masaaki Sawanobori (9)
- Highest home attendance: 21,931 (vs Júbilo Iwata, 27 April 1996)
- Lowest home attendance: 10,151 (vs Urawa Red Diamonds, 28 August 1996); 7,348 (vs Nagoya Grampus Eight, 11 May 1996, Nagasaki Stadium)
- Average home league attendance: 12,962
Home colours	Away colours

The 1996 season was Shimizu S-Pulse's fifth season in existence and their fourth season in the J1 League. The club also competed in the Emperor's Cup, the J.League Cup, and the Suntory Cup. The team finished the season tenth in the league and won the J.League Cup.

== Review and events ==
=== League results summary ===
Overall								Home						Away					
Pld	W	D	L	GF	GA	GD	Pts	W	D	L	GF	GA	GD	W	D	L	GF	GA	GD
30	12	0	18	50	60	−10	37	5	0	10	22	31	−9	7	0	8	28	29	−1

Source: J.LEAGUE OFFICIAL GUIDE 1997. ISBN 4-09-102329-0.

=== League results by round ===
Round	1	2	3	4	5	6	7	8	9	10	11	12	13	14	15	16	17	18	19	20	21	22	23	24	25	26	27	28	29	30
Ground	A	H	A	A	H	A	H	A	H	H	A	A	H	A	H	H	A	H	A	H	A	H	H	A	H	A	H	A	H	A
Result	L	W	L	L	W	W	W	L	L	L	W	L	L	L	L	L	L	L	W	L	W	W	W	W	L	L	L	W	L	W
Position	11	10	11	11	8	7	7	7	8	9	9	9	11	13	13	13	13	14	12	12	12	11	10	10	10	10	10	10	10	10

Source: J.LEAGUE OFFICIAL GUIDE 1997. ISBN 4-09-102329-0.
A = Away; H = Home; W = Win; D = Draw; L = Loss

== Competitions ==
Competitions	Position
J.League	10th / 16 clubs
Emperor's Cup	Quarterfinals
J.League Cup	Champions
Suntory Cup	Semifinals

== Domestic results ==
=== J.League ===
16 March 1996 1	Kashima Antlers	4–1	Shimizu S-Pulse	Kashima Soccer Stadium
15:04 JST (UTC+09)	Mazinho 0', 28'; Hasegawa 65', 75'	J. League	Sawanobori 10'	Attendance: 15,922; Referee: Zoran Petrović; Assistant referees: Noboru Ishiyama, Toshimitsu Yoshida; Fourth official: Masato Nogami

20 March 1996 2	Shimizu S-Pulse	2–1	Cerezo Osaka	Nihondaira Sports Stadium
15:00 JST (UTC+09)	Hasegawa 85'; Sawanobori 88'	J. League	Kajinō (yellow card) 67'; Marquinhos 73'	Attendance: 16,413; Referee: Tetsuya Hamana; Assistant referees: Sōichirō Kaneko, Hitoshi Nakagomi; Fourth official: Naoki Uchiyama

23 March 1996 3	Yokohama Flügels	1–0 (V-goal) (a.e.t.)	Shimizu S-Pulse	Yokohama Mitsuzawa Football Stadium
15:03 JST (UTC+09)	Sampaio (yellow card) 20'; Miura 100'	J. League		Attendance: 10,296; Referee: Hiroyuki Umemoto; Assistant referees: Noboru Ishiyama, Kōji Minami; Fourth official: Michio Nakahara

30 March 1996 4	Gamba Osaka	2–2 (V-goal) (a.e.t.) (4–3 p)	Shimizu S-Pulse	Expo '70 Commemorative Stadium
15:00 JST (UTC+09)	Mladenović 2', 54'	J. League	Nagai 25'; Massaro (yellow card) 53'; Y. Matsubara (yellow card) 82', (goal) 89'; Saitō (yellow card) 84'	Attendance: 5,674; Referee: Kazuo Kakihana; Assistant referees: Naoki Esumi, Ichirō Inukai; Fourth official: Tsuyoshi Miyake
	Penalties
	(penalty scored) Matsuyama; (penalty scored) Morishita; (penalty scored) Škrinjar; (penalty scored) Kiba		(penalty missed) Oliva; (penalty scored) Morioka; (penalty scored) Santos; (penalty scored) T. Itō; (penalty missed) Andō

3 April 1996 5	Shimizu S-Pulse	1–0 (V-goal) (a.e.t.)	Sanfrecce Hiroshima	Nihondaira Sports Stadium
19:01 JST (UTC+09)	Massaro (yellow card) 89', 116'	J. League	Michiki (yellow card) 73'; Kojima (yellow card) 89'	Attendance: 12,363; Referee: Kenji Tanaka; Assistant referees: Yasushi Tsuchimoto, Takashi Aoki; Fourth official: Toshiyuki Asanuma

6 April 1996 6	Kyoto Purple Sanga	1–5	Shimizu S-Pulse	Kyoto Nishikyogoku Stadium
15:04 JST (UTC+09)	Alexandre (yellow card) 31'; Nagata 45'	J. League	Massaro 33', 60'; Oliva (yellow card) 44'; Sawanobori 56', 67'; T. Itō 66'; Y. Itō (yellow card) 86'; Saitō (yellow card) 89'	Attendance: 8,683; Referee: Tōru Kamikawa; Assistant referees: Yoshikazu Hiroshima, Kōji Minami; Fourth official: Mitsuyoshi Nakaguma

13 April 1996 7	Shimizu S-Pulse	5–1	Bellmare Hiratsuka	Nihondaira Sports Stadium
15:05 JST (UTC+09)	Oliva 24', 55'; Massaro 38', 48', 83'; Ōenoki (yellow card) 51'	J. League	Miyazawa (yellow card) 21'; Paulinho 57', (yellow card) 85'	Attendance: 14,477; Referee: Hiroyuki Umemoto; Assistant referees: Yū Nakamura, Hiroyuki Ōnishi; Fourth official: Masakazu Hōjō

17 April 1996 8	Kashiwa Reysol	2–1 (V-goal) (a.e.t.)	Shimizu S-Pulse	Hitachi Kashiwa Soccer Stadium
19:00 JST (UTC+09)	N. Katō 80'; Hashiratani 95'	J. League	Sawanobori 77'	Attendance: 9,212; Referee: Archundia; Assistant referees: Kazuhisa Osada, Toshimitsu Yoshida; Fourth official: Misao Kataoka

20 April 1996 9	Shimizu S-Pulse	0–2	Avispa Fukuoka	Nihondaira Sports Stadium
15:04 JST (UTC+09)		J. League	Troglio 49'; Umeyama (yellow card) 53'; Maradona 56'; Tsunami (yellow card) 58'; Keigoshi (yellow card) 73'	Attendance: 14,011; Referee: Piotr Werner; Assistant referees: Takashi Kunori, Takao Onshi; Fourth official: Naoki Uchiyama

27 April 1996 10	Shimizu S-Pulse	1–2 (V-goal) (a.e.t.)	Júbilo Iwata	Nihondaira Sports Stadium
15:05 JST (UTC+09)	Ōgami 55' (o.g.); Massaro (yellow card) 56' (yellow-red card) 65'; Ōenoki (yellow card) 73'	J. League	H. Suzuki 74'; Fujita 91'	Attendance: 21,931; Referee: Yasuhiro Hemmi; Assistant referees: Yasushi Tsuchimoto, Naoyuki Mori; Fourth official: Toshiyuki Asanuma

1 May 1996 11	Yokohama Marinos	1–2	Shimizu S-Pulse	Tokyo National Stadium
19:04 JST (UTC+09)	Bisconti 49'	J. League	Toninho 30'; Sawanobori 64'	Attendance: 25,782; Referee: Zoran Petrović; Assistant referees: Noboru Ishiyama, Ichirō Inukai; Fourth official: Kimihiko Dakiyama

4 May 1996 12	Urawa Red Diamonds	2–1 (V-goal) (a.e.t.)	Shimizu S-Pulse	Urawa Komaba Stadium
18:34 JST (UTC+09)	Iwase 44'; Fukuda 98'	J. League	Massaro 79'; Ademir Santos (yellow card) 87'	Attendance: 19,213; Referee: Yoshitsugu Katayama; Assistant referees: Toshiyuki Mayuzumi, Tetsu Karakida; Fourth official: Akio Hayashi

11 May 1996 13	Shimizu S-Pulse	1–4	Nagoya Grampus Eight	Nagasaki Stadium
15:00 JST (UTC+09)	Y. Matsubara 64'	J. League	Stojković 26'; Okayama 49'; Hirano 66'; Durix 77'	Attendance: 7,348; Referee: Yasuhiro Matsuzaki; Assistant referees: Hideaki Harada, Masatoshi Shibata; Fourth official: Shigehisa Yamaguchi

15 May 1996 14	Verdy Kawasaki	5–3	Shimizu S-Pulse	Kawasaki Todoroki Stadium
19:00 JST (UTC+09)	Sanada 9' (o.g.); Kitazawa (yellow card) 11', (goal) 69'; Caíco 24'; K. Miura 36', 46'; Gen (yellow card) 51'	J. League	Saitō 42'; Sanada 57' (o.g.); Hasegawa 67'; Horiike (yellow card) 85'	Attendance: 12,016; Referee: Yoshimi Ogawa; Assistant referees: Mitsuru Satō, Kimio Izaki; Fourth official: Kenji Ōgiya

18 May 1996 15	Shimizu S-Pulse	1–2	JEF United Ichihara	Nihondaira Sports Stadium
17:05 JST (UTC+09)	Oliva 87'	J. League	Jō 10'; Ejiri (yellow card) 41'; Maslovar 68'	Attendance: 13,380; Referee: Keiichi Sunakawa; Assistant referees: Tetsu Karakida, Hitoshi Nakagomi; Fourth official: Masakazu Hōjō

28 August 1996 16	Shimizu S-Pulse	2–3	Urawa Red Diamonds	Nihondaira Sports Stadium
19:04 JST (UTC+09)	Ōenoki 28'; Saitō (yellow card) 56'; Takita 61' (o.g.)	J. League	Ōshiba 43'; Yamada 75'; Okano 76'	Attendance: 10,151; Referee: Yasuhiro Hemmi; Assistant referees: Yoshikazu Hiroshima, Takashi Aoki; Fourth official: Naoki Uchiyama

31 August 1996 17	Nagoya Grampus Eight	2–1	Shimizu S-Pulse	Nagoya Mizuho Athletics Stadium
19:05 JST (UTC+09)	Torres 28'; Hirano 56', (yellow card) 82'; Ogawa (yellow card) 68'	J. League	Y. Matsubara 37'; Ōenoki (yellow card) 39'; T. Itō (yellow card) 55'	Attendance: 21,008; Referee: Bemard Saules; Assistant referees: Naoyuki Mori, Kō Ōishi; Fourth official: Takao Wakahara

7 September 1996 18	Shimizu S-Pulse	0–2	Verdy Kawasaki	Nihondaira Sports Stadium
16:04 JST (UTC+09)		J. League	K. Miura 30'; Magrão 34'	Attendance: 15,814; Referee: Zoran Petrović; Assistant referees: Takashi Kunori, Toshiyuki Mayuzumi; Fourth official: Toshiyuki Asanuma

14 September 1996 19	JEF United Ichihara	0–1 (V-goal) (a.e.t.)	Shimizu S-Pulse	Akita Yabase Stadium
14:04 JST (UTC+09)	Manaka (yellow card) 35'; Igarashi (yellow card) 39'	J. League	Saitō (yellow card) 25'; Sawanobori (yellow card) 74'; Shimokawa 91' (o.g.)	Attendance: 7,848; Referee: Tatsumi Ōno; Assistant referees: Kenichi Koshiyama, Takao Onshi; Fourth official: Toshihisa Sugiyama

21 September 1996 20	Shimizu S-Pulse	0–2	Kashima Antlers	Nihondaira Sports Stadium
15:03 JST (UTC+09)		J. League	Yanagisawa 34'; Honda (yellow card) 62'; Kurosaki 72'; Jorginho (yellow card) 78'	Attendance: 10,673; Referee: Bemard Saules; Assistant referees: Hideaki Harada, Kō Ōishi; Fourth official: Masakazu Hōjō

28 September 1996 21	Cerezo Osaka	2–3	Shimizu S-Pulse	Osaka Nagai Stadium
15:00 JST (UTC+09)	Nishizawa 19'; Narcizio 57'	J. League	Santos 51'; Hasegawa 52', 75'	Attendance: 8,043; Referee: Shinichirō Obata; Assistant referees: Kimio Izaki, Hiroyuki Ōnishi; Fourth official: Tamotsu Ōnishi

2 October 1996 22	Shimizu S-Pulse	4–2	Yokohama Flügels	Tokyo National Stadium
19:00 JST (UTC+09)	Hasegawa 8'; Saitō (yellow card) 56'; Sawanobori 59'; Oliva 61', 86'	J. League	Yamaguchi 42', 87'; Ōtake (yellow card) 46'; Mori (yellow card) 86'	Attendance: 16,788; Referee: Tetsuya Hamana; Assistant referees: Takashi Kunori, Satoru Ishizawa; Fourth official: Hide Lii

5 October 1996 23	Shimizu S-Pulse	3–2 (V-goal) (a.e.t.)	Gamba Osaka	Nihondaira Sports Stadium
15:04 JST (UTC+09)	Andō (yellow card) 53'; Nagai 79'; T. Itō 84'; Sawanobori (yellow card) 98'; Mukōjima 106'	J. League	Gillhaus 44', 49'; Tsveiba (yellow card) 57'; Shimada (yellow card) 93'	Attendance: 11,046; Referee: Hiroyuki Umemoto; Assistant referees: Yasushi Tsuchimoto, Akihisa Makino; Fourth official: Masakazu Hōjō

16 October 1996 24	Sanfrecce Hiroshima	2–3	Shimizu S-Pulse	Kagoshima Kamoike Stadium
19:03 JST (UTC+09)	Michiki 19', 26'	J. League	Nagai 66'; Hasegawa 86', 89'	Attendance: 6,314; Referee: Fumikazu Shioyazono; Assistant referees: Yoshikazu Hiroshima, Masatoshi Shibata; Fourth official: Sadaaki Hagiwara

19 October 1996 25	Shimizu S-Pulse	0–2	Kyoto Purple Sanga	Kobe Universiade Memorial Stadium
15:05 JST (UTC+09)		J. League	Fujiyoshi 46'; Alexandre 54'	Attendance: 8,902; Referee: Yoshitsugu Katayama; Assistant referees: Hiroyuki Izumi, Kazuhiko Matsumura; Fourth official: Keiji Hayashi

26 October 1996 26	Bellmare Hiratsuka	3–0	Shimizu S-Pulse	Hiratsuka Stadium
15:03 JST (UTC+09)	Noguchi 18'; 67' (o.g.); Betinho 89'	J. League		Attendance: 8,240; Referee: Hideo Kikuchi; Assistant referees: Masahiro Katagiri, Ichirō Inukai; Fourth official: Yasuhiro Mineshita

30 October 1996 27	Shimizu S-Pulse	2–4	Kashiwa Reysol	Nihondaira Sports Stadium
18:59 JST (UTC+09)	Mukōjima 50', 89'	J. League	Watanabe 1'; Careca 5', (yellow card) 71'; Kojima (yellow card) 15'; Sakai 64'; Edílson 87'	Attendance: 10,237; Referee: Bemard Saules; Assistant referees: Kōji Taniuchi, Takayoshi Kashino; Fourth official: Naoki Uchiyama

2 November 1996 28	Avispa Fukuoka	1–3	Shimizu S-Pulse	Hakatanomori Football Stadium
15:00 JST (UTC+09)	Miyamura (yellow card) 88'; Troglio 89'	J. League	Saitō 32'; Morioka (yellow card) 35'; Sawanobori 57', 75'	Attendance: 5,616; Referee: Kazuo Kakihana; Assistant referees: Satoru Kawano, Masatoshi Shibata; Fourth official: Ryōichi Imamura

6 November 1996 29	Shimizu S-Pulse	0–2	Yokohama Marinos	Nihondaira Sports Stadium
19:03 JST (UTC+09)		J. League	Acosta 10', 53'; Matsuda (yellow card) 52'	Attendance: 10,898; Referee: Tatsumi Ōno; Assistant referees: Tetsu Karakida, Kōji Minami; Fourth official: Toshiyuki Asanuma

9 November 1996 30	Júbilo Iwata	1–2	Shimizu S-Pulse	Júbilo Iwata Stadium
14:33 JST (UTC+09)	Schillaci 64', (yellow card) 71'	J. League	Sugimoto (yellow card) 25'; T. Itō 36', 89'; Sawanobori (yellow card) 57'	Attendance: 17,543; Referee: Yoshimi Ogawa; Assistant referees: Morihisa Yamaguchi, Naoki Esumi; Fourth official: Takuya Okada

=== Emperor's Cup ===
1st Round	bye

2nd Round	bye

17 November 1996 3rd Round	Shimizu S-Pulse	1–0	Consadole Sapporo	Nihondaira Sports Stadium
13:00 JST (UTC+09)	? ?'

23 December 1996 4th Round	Shimizu S-Pulse	2–1	Fukushima FC	Gifu Nagaragawa Stadium
13:00 JST (UTC+09)	? ?' ? ?'		? ?'

26 December 1996 Quarterfinals	Sanfrecce Hiroshima	3–0	Shimizu S-Pulse	Kobe Universiade Memorial Stadium
19:00 JST (UTC+09)	? ?' ? ?' ? ?'

=== J.League Cup ===
1 June 1996 GL-B-1-1	Shimizu S-Pulse	1–0	Kashima Antlers	Nihondaira Sports Stadium
16:05 JST (UTC+09)	Ōenoki 55'	J. League	Honda (yellow card) 55'	Attendance: 15,039; Referee: Tōru Kamikawa; Assistant referees: Kazuya Yanagisawa, Yasushi Tsuchimoto; Fourth official: Naoki Uchiyama

5 June 1996 GL-B-1-2	Kashima Antlers	2–2 (2–3 agg.)	Shimizu S-Pulse	Kashima Soccer Stadium
19:00 JST (UTC+09)	Leonardo 35', 69'	J. League	Oliva 59'; Hasegawa 84'; Ademir Santos (yellow card) 89'	Attendance: 15,330; Referee: Yasuhiro Matsuzaki; Assistant referees: Mitsuru Satō, Takao Onshi; Fourth official: Hiroshi Kiuchi

8 June 1996 GL-B-2-1	Yokohama Flügels	0–1	Shimizu S-Pulse	Yokohama Mitsuzawa Football Stadium
18:33 JST (UTC+09)		J. League	Nagai 58', (yellow card) 62'; Ōenoki (yellow card) 86'	Attendance: 10,839; Referee: Tatsumi Ōno; Assistant referees: Takayoshi Kashino, Kō Ōishi; Fourth official: Mitsune Yamaguchi

12 June 1996 GL-B-2-2	Shimizu S-Pulse	3–3 (4–3 agg.)	Yokohama Flügels	Nihondaira Sports Stadium
19:00 JST (UTC+09)	Sawanobori 11'; Santos (yellow card) 37'; Hasegawa 60'; Nagai 81'	J. League	Maezono 24', 69'; Yamaguchi (yellow card) 28'; Satsukawa 64'	Attendance: 14,949; Referee: Zoran Petrović; Assistant referees: Kōji Taniuchi, Naoyuki Mori; Fourth official: Masakazu Hōjō

15 June 1996 GL-B-3-1	Shimizu S-Pulse	3–1	Avispa Fukuoka	Nihondaira Sports Stadium
16:04 JST (UTC+09)	Massaro 22'; Nagai 31'; Oliva 55'	J. League	Troglio (yellow card) 68'; Maradona 89'	Attendance: 13,079; Referee: Keiichi Sunakawa; Assistant referees: Kazuya Yanagisawa, Akio Okutani; Fourth official: Masakazu Hōjō

19 June 1996 GL-B-3-2	Avispa Fukuoka	0–1 (1–4 agg.)	Shimizu S-Pulse	Hakatanomori Football Stadium
19:01 JST (UTC+09)	I. Nakata (yellow card) 62'	J. League	Hasegawa 80'	Attendance: 6,519; Referee: Hiroshi Tanabe; Assistant referees: Hideaki Harada, Kazuhiko Matsumura; Fourth official: Daikichi Kanada

22 June 1996 GL-B-4-1	Shimizu S-Pulse	2–1	Cerezo Osaka	Nihondaira Sports Stadium
16:03 JST (UTC+09)	Nagai 50', 69', (yellow card) 75'	J. League	Narcizio 61'	Attendance: 15,401; Referee: Kiyoshi Ōta; Assistant referees: Masahiro Katagiri, Yasushi Tsuchimoto; Fourth official: Naoki Uchiyama

26 June 1996 GL-B-4-2	Cerezo Osaka	0–1 (1–3 agg.)	Shimizu S-Pulse	Osaka Nagai No.2 Stadium
19:01 JST (UTC+09)		J. League	Sawanobori 76'	Attendance: 5,677; Referee: Archundia; Assistant referees: Morihisa Yamaguchi, Takashi Aoki; Fourth official: Tamotsu Ōnishi

29 June 1996 GL-B-5-1	Shimizu S-Pulse	2–0	Nagoya Grampus Eight	Nihondaira Sports Stadium
19:04 JST (UTC+09)	Oliva 20', 58'; Santos (yellow card) 81'	J. League	Torres (yellow card) 44'	Attendance: 19,283; Referee: Tatsumi Ōno; Assistant referees: Kazuhisa Osada, Hitoshi Nakagomi; Fourth official: Masakazu Hōjō

3 July 1996 GL-B-5-2	Nagoya Grampus Eight	6–1 (6–3 agg.)	Shimizu S-Pulse	Nagoya Mizuho Athletics Stadium
19:04 JST (UTC+09)	Okayama 4', 68'; Hirano 7', 42'; Mochizuki (yellow card) 63'; Tomasz 75'; Moriyama 84'	J. League	Sawanobori (yellow card) 63'; Oliva 69'	Attendance: 18,034; Referee: Yasuhiro Hemmi; Assistant referees: Kazuaki Hamaguchi, Hiroyuki Ōnishi; Fourth official: Kōta Kurimoto

10 August 1996 GL-B-6-1	Verdy Kawasaki	0–0	Shimizu S-Pulse	Kawasaki Todoroki Stadium
19:00 JST (UTC+09)	Nakamura (yellow card) 20'; Magrão (yellow card) 85'; Watanabe (yellow card) 88'	J. League		Attendance: 18,835; Referee: Tetsuya Hamana; Assistant referees: Kenichi Koshiyama, Kō Ōishi; Fourth official: Masaki Yoshihara

14 August 1996 GL-B-6-2	Shimizu S-Pulse	0–0 (0–0 agg.)	Verdy Kawasaki	Nihondaira Sports Stadium
19:00 JST (UTC+09)		J. League		Attendance: 21,438; Referee: Zoran Petrović; Assistant referees: Hitoshi Nakagomi, Hiroyuki Ōnishi; Fourth official: Toshiyuki Asanuma

17 August 1996 GL-B-7-1	JEF United Ichihara	3–1	Shimizu S-Pulse	Ichihara Stadium
19:01 JST (UTC+09)	Nakanishi 23'; Maslovar 56'; Nonomura (yellow card) 73'; Jō 79'	J. League	Saitō (yellow card) 41'; Oliva (yellow card) 44'; Sawanobori 74'	Attendance: 9,071; Referee: Yoshitsugu Katayama; Assistant referees: Yū Nakamura, Kazuhisa Osada; Fourth official: Masahiko Tsuma

21 August 1996 GL-B-7-2	Shimizu S-Pulse	4–0 (5–3 agg.)	JEF United Ichihara	Nihondaira Sports Stadium
18:59 JST (UTC+09)	Hasegawa 10', 38'; Oliva 49'; Sawanobori (yellow card) 76'; Morioka 83'	J. League	Jō (yellow card) 20' (yellow-red card) 70'; Manaka (yellow card) 48'	Attendance: 12,788; Referee: Hideo Kikuchi; Assistant referees: Sōichirō Kaneko, Kimio Izaki; Fourth official: Toshiyuki Asanuma

4 September 1996 Semifinals	Shimizu S-Pulse	5–0	Bellmare Hiratsuka	Nihondaira Sports Stadium
19:03 JST (UTC+09)	Oliva 15', 22'; Ōenoki 18'; Hasegawa 56'; T. Itō 84'	J. League		Attendance: 13,629; Referee: Lim Kee Chong; Assistant referees: Morihisa Yamaguchi, Kazuya Yanagisawa; Fourth official: Hiroyuki Umemoto

25 September 1996 Final	Verdy Kawasaki	3–3 (a.e.t.) (4–5 p)	Shimizu S-Pulse	Tokyo National Stadium
19:01 JST (UTC+09)	Nakamura (yellow card) 28'; Magrão (yellow card) 29'; Hashiratani (yellow card) 52'; Argel (yellow card) 56', (goal) 89'; Sanada 87' (o.g.); Bismarck 105'	J. League	Sawanobori (yellow card) 26'; Hasegawa 68'; Oliva 81'; Santos 90', (yellow card) 104'	Attendance: 28,232; Referee: Leslie Mottram; Assistant referees: Yoshikazu Hiroshima, Naoki Esumi; Fourth official: Keiichi Sunakawa
	Penalties
	(penalty scored) K. Miura; (penalty missed) Magrão; (penalty scored) Bismarck; (penalty scored) Kitazawa; (penalty scored) Argel		(penalty scored) Sawanobori; (penalty scored) Santos; (penalty scored) Ōenoki; (penalty scored) Morioka; (penalty scored) Oliva

=== Suntory Cup ===
13 November 1996 Semifinals	Shimizu S-Pulse	0–0 (V-goal) (a.e.t.) (1–3 p)	Nagoya Grampus Eight	Nihondaira Sports Stadium
19:00 JST (UTC+09)		J. League		Attendance: 15,285; Referee: Bemard Saules; Assistant referees: Kazuya Yanagisawa, Hideaki Harada; Fourth official: Yoshimi Ogawa
	Penalties
	(penalty scored) Sawanobori; (penalty missed) Santos; (penalty missed) Saitō; (penalty missed) Ōenoki		(penalty scored) Durix; (penalty missed) Torres; (penalty scored) Stojković; (penalty scored) Nishigaya

== Player statistics ==
Pos.	Nat.	Player	D.o.B. (Age)	Height / Weight	J.League		Emperor's Cup		J.League Cup		Suntory Cup		Total	
Pos.	Nat.	Player	D.o.B. (Age)	Height / Weight	Apps	Goals	Apps	Goals	Apps	Goals	Apps	Goals	Apps	Goals
MF	(Brazil)	Santos	December 9, 1960 (aged 35)	176 cm / 74 kg	27	1	3	0	15	1	1	0	46	2
FW	(Italy)	Massaro	May 23, 1961 (aged 34)	179 cm / 74 kg	11	7	0	0	5	1	0	0	16	8
MF	(Brazil)	Toninho	March 23, 1965 (aged 30)	186 cm / 79 kg	4	1	0	0	3	0	0	0	7	1
DF	(Japan)	Katsumi Ōenoki	April 3, 1965 (aged 30)	178 cm / 71 kg	26	1	3	0	16	2	1	0	46	3
DF	(Japan)	Takumi Horiike	September 6, 1965 (aged 30)	173 cm / 66 kg	30	0	3	0	16	0	1	0	50	0
FW	(Japan)	Kenta Hasegawa	September 25, 1965 (aged 30)	177 cm / 77 kg	24	7	3	2	16	7	1	0	44	16
FW	(Japan)	Tatsuru Mukōjima	January 9, 1966 (aged 30)	161 cm / 54 kg	6	3	0	0	1	0	0	0	7	3
MF	(Japan)	Masao Sugimoto	June 26, 1967 (aged 28)	167 cm / 64 kg	6	0	0	0	3	0	0	0	9	0
GK	(Japan)	Masanori Sanada	March 6, 1968 (aged 28)	178 cm / 73 kg	30	0	3	0	16	0	1	0	50	0
MF	(Japan)	Ademir Santos	March 28, 1968 (aged 27)	174 cm / 64 kg	1	0	0	0	0	0	0	0	1	0
GK	(Japan)	Takeshi Urakami	February 7, 1969 (aged 27)	182 cm / 79 kg	0	0		0	0	0	0	0		0
MF	(Japan)	Masaaki Sawanobori	January 12, 1970 (aged 26)	170 cm / 66 kg	29	9	3	0	16	3	1	0	49	12
GK	(Japan)	Kōji Nakahara	July 27, 1970 (aged 25)	178 cm / 78 kg	0	0		0	0	0	0	0		0
MF	(Japan)	Hideki Nagai	January 26, 1971 (aged 25)	175 cm / 66 kg	29	3	3	0	16	5	1	0	49	8
DF	(Japan)	Masahiro Andō	April 2, 1972 (aged 23)	176 cm / 67 kg	30	0	3	0	16	0	1	0	50	0
DF	(Japan)	Toshihide Saitō	April 20, 1973 (aged 22)	180 cm / 70 kg	29	2	3	0	16	0	1	0	49	2
MF	(Japan)	Yuzuki Itō	April 7, 1974 (aged 21)	172 cm / 65 kg	13	0	0	0	0	0	0	0	13	0
DF	(Japan)	Hiroyuki Shirai	June 17, 1974 (aged 21)	180 cm / 70 kg	5	0	0	0	1	0	0	0	6	0
FW	(Japan)	Hiroaki Tajima	June 27, 1974 (aged 21)	173 cm / 65 kg	3	0	0	0	0	0	0	0	3	0
FW	(Japan)	Yoshika Matsubara	August 19, 1974 (aged 21)	179 cm / 73 kg	13	3	0	0	3	0	0	0	16	3
MF	(Japan)	Teruyoshi Itō	August 31, 1974 (aged 21)	168 cm / 72 kg	26	4	3	0	7	1	1	0	37	5
MF	(Japan)	Noriaki Suzuki	April 23, 1975 (aged 20)	165 cm / 60 kg	0	0		0	0	0	0	0		0
FW	(Japan)	Ryūzō Shimizu	July 1, 1975 (aged 20)	173 cm / 68 kg	0	0		0	0	0	0	0		0
MF	(Japan)	Yasuhiro Nagahashi	August 2, 1975 (aged 20)	170 cm / 67 kg	0	0		0	0	0	0	0		0
DF	(Brazil)	Marcelo	August 20, 1975 (aged 20)	182 cm / 70 kg	0	0		0	0	0	0	0		0
DF	(Japan)	Ryūzō Morioka	October 7, 1975 (aged 20)	180 cm / 71 kg	23	0	3	0	16	1	1	0	43	1
DF	(Japan)	Shinichi Niimura	April 20, 1976 (aged 19)	174 cm / 68 kg	0	0		0	0	0	0	0		0
MF	(Japan)	Yukihiko Satō	May 11, 1976 (aged 19)	177 cm / 68 kg	1	0	0	0	0	0	0	0	1	0
DF	(Japan)	Tadaaki Matsubara	July 2, 1977 (aged 18)	182 cm / 74 kg	0	0		0	0	0	0	0		0
DF	(Japan)	Ryō Ōishi	July 13, 1977 (aged 18)	177 cm / 70 kg	0	0		0	0	0	0	0		0
DF	(Japan)	Kazuyuki Toda	December 30, 1977 (aged 18)	178 cm / 68 kg	5	0	0	0	1	0	0	0	6	0
GK	(Japan)	Keisuke Hada	February 20, 1978 (aged 18)	182 cm / 75 kg	0	0		0	0	0	0	0		0
FW	(Japan)	Hiroki Matsubara †	November 15, 1973 (aged 22)	176 cm / 69 kg	2	0	0	0	0	0	0	0	2	0
FW	(Argentina)	Oliva †	September 26, 1971 (aged 24)	-cm / -kg	18	5	2	1	16	9	1	0	37	15

- † player(s) joined the team after the opening of this season.

== Transfers ==
In:

No.	Pos.	Nation	Player
—	GK	JPN	Keisuke Hada (from Minami Uwa High School)
—	DF	JPN	Toshihide Saitō (from Waseda University)
—	DF	JPN	Tadaaki Matsubara (from Shimizu Commercial High School)
—	DF	JPN	Ryō Ōishi (from Shimizu Commercial High School)
—	DF	JPN	Kazuyuki Toda (from Toin Gakuen High School)
—	MF	BRA	Toninho (loan return from Urawa Red Diamonds)
—	MF	JPN	Hideki Nagai (from Fukuoka Blux)
—	FW	JPN	Yoshika Matsubara (from Júbilo Iwata)

Out:

No.	Pos.	Nation	Player
—	GK	JPN	Katsumi Ōtaki
—	DF	JPN	Yasuhiro Yamada (retired)
—	DF	JPN	Naoki Naitō (to Sanfrecce Hiroshima)
—	DF	JPN	Hiroaki Hiraoka (to Toshiba)
—	DF	JPN	Kiyoshi Nakamura
—	MF	JPN	Yasutoshi Miura (to Verdy Kawasaki)
—	MF	BRA	Dias
—	MF	JPN	Yasuhiro Yoshida (to Sanfrecce Hiroshima)
—	MF	JPN	Takamitsu Ōta (to Toshiba)
—	MF	JPN	Kenji Tanaka
—	MF	JPN	Noriaki Asakura (to Toshiba)
—	FW	JPN	Jun Iwashita (to Vissel Kobe)
—	FW	BRA	Marco

== Transfers during the season ==
=== In ===
- (Japan) Hiroki Matsubara (from Ritsumeikan University)
- (Argentina) Fernando Nicolas Oliva (from Atlético Central Córdoba on March)

=== Out ===
- (Brazil) Marcelo (on July)
- (Brazil) Toninho

== Awards ==
- J.League Rookie of the Year: (Japan) Toshihide Saito

== Other pages ==
- (in Japanese) J. League official site
- (in Japanese) Shimizu S-Pulse official site
