= Fuji Tokoha University =

Coordinates: 35°11′49″N 138°41′28″E

- 富士常葉大学
- Type: Private
- Established: 1990; university from 2000, closed in 2018
- Location: 325 Obuchi, Fuji-shi, Shizuoka 417-0801 Japan, Fuji, Shizuoka, Japan

Fuji Tokoha University (富士常葉大学, Fuji Tokoha Daigaku) was a private university in Fuji City, Shizuoka Prefecture Japan.

The predecessor of the school was founded in 1990, and it was chartered as a university in 2000. The university had three departments:

- College of Distribution Economics
- College of Environment and Disaster Research
- University Library
