= Daizo Okitsu =

Japanese footballer

Daizo Okitsu 興津 大三
Personal information
- Full name: Daizo Okitsu
- Date of birth: June 15, 1974 (age 52)
- Place of birth: Hyogo, Japan
- Height: 1.73 m (5 ft 8 in)
- Position: Midfielder

Youth career
- 1990–1992: Shimizu Commercial High School
- 1993–1996: University of Tsukuba

Senior career*
Years	Team	Apps	(Gls)
1997–1999	Shimizu S-Pulse	17	(1)
2000	Cerezo Osaka	12	(0)
Total		29	(1)
Medal record
Shimizu S-Pulse
Runner-up	J1 League	1999
Runner-up	Emperor's Cup	1998
- * Club domestic league appearances and goals

Daizo Okitsu (興津 大三, Okitsu Daizō; born June 15, 1974) is a former Japanese football player.

== Playing career ==
Okitsu was born in Hyogo Prefecture on June 15, 1974. After graduating from University of Tsukuba, he joined J1 League club Shimizu S-Pulse in 1997. He played many matches as forward in 1997. However, he could hardly play in the match from 1998. In 2000, he moved to Cerezo Osaka. He played as midfielder in 2000 and retired end of 2000 season.

== Club statistics ==
Club performance			League		Cup		League Cup		Total	
Season	Club	League	Apps	Goals	Apps	Goals	Apps	Goals	Apps	Goals
Japan			League		Emperor's Cup		J.League Cup		Total	
1997	Shimizu S-Pulse	J1 League	17	1	0	0	0	0	17	1
1998	Shimizu S-Pulse	J1 League	0	0	0	0	1	0	1	0
1999	Shimizu S-Pulse	J1 League	0	0	2	0	0	0	2	0
2000	Cerezo Osaka	J1 League	12	0	1	0	3	0	16	0
Total			29	1	3	0	4	0	36	1
