= Hiroyuki Ishida =

Japanese footballer

Hiroyuki Ishida 石田 博行
Personal information
- Full name: Hiroyuki Ishida
- Date of birth: August 31, 1979 (age 47)
- Place of birth: Yokohama, Japan
- Height: 1.72 m (5 ft 7 1/2 in)
- Positions: Forward; midfielder

Senior career*
Years	Team	Apps	(Gls)
1998–1999	Shimizu S-Pulse	2	(0)
2001	Tokyo Verdy	0	(0)
2001	Clementi Khalsa	20	(6)
2001–2004	Sydney Olympic	65	(7)
2005–2006	Perth Glory	16	(1)
2006	→Johor (loan)	5	(0)
2006	Ventforet Kofu	0	(0)
2007–2008	Sagan Tosu	19	(2)
2009–2013	Fujieda MYFC	60	(11)
Total		187	(27)
Medal record
Shimizu S-Pulse
Runner-up	J1 League	1999
Runner-up	Emperor's Cup	1998
- * Club domestic league appearances and goals

Hiroyuki Ishida (石田 博行, Ishida Hiroyuki; born August 31, 1979) is a former Japanese football player.

== Early life ==
Ishida was born in Yokohama on August 31, 1979. Growing up, he worked as a paperboy.

== Career ==
After graduating from Junior high school, he moved to Brazil in 1995 at the age of sixteen and played many clubs. In 1998, he returned to Japan and joined J1 League club Shimizu S-Pulse. On October 24, he debuted against Bellmare Hiratsuka. However he could hardly play in the match until 1999. After 1 year blank, he joined Tokyo Verdy in 2001. However he could not play at all in the match.

In June 2001, he moved to Singapore and joined Clementi Khalsa. He played many matches until October 2001.

In October 2001, he moved to Australia and joined Olympic Sharks (later Sydney Olympic). He played in the first season of the A-League for Perth Glory coming from Sydney Olympic. Not long after the 05/06 season had finished he went to pursue his playing career in Malaysia after the Perth Glory changed its ownership over to the FFA.

After a brief stint at Johor FC in Malaysia, he moved back to Japan with Ventforet Kofu in 2006, then in J1. In 2007, he moved to J2 League side Sagan Tosu having not made a single appearance at Ventforet Kofu and played there for 2 seasons. After six months without a club, he joined Prefectural Leagues side Fujieda MYFC in the summer of 2009. He played regularly and the club was promoted to Regional Leagues in 2010 and Japan Football League in 2012. However his opportunity to play decreased from 2012 and he retired at the end of the 2013 season.

During his time at Sydney Olympic, Hiroyuki Ishida was a firm fan favourite. Ishida was known for his outstanding pace and dribbling skills on the wing, willingly pressuring the opposition; which is why the Olympic fans adored him so much. During his time at Olympic, Ishida claimed the NSL (National Soccer League) Championship in the 2001–2002 season, as well as the NSL Minor Premiership and the NSL Runners-up in 2002–2003.

== Style of play ==
Ishida played as a forward or midfielder. He was known for his speed.

== Club statistics ==
Club performance			League		Cup		League Cup		Total	
Season	Club	League	Apps	Goals	Apps	Goals	Apps	Goals	Apps	Goals
Japan			League		Emperor's Cup		J.League Cup		Total	
1998	Shimizu S-Pulse	J1 League	2	0	0	0	0	0	2	0
1999	Shimizu S-Pulse	J1 League	0	0	0	0	0	0	0	0
2001	Tokyo Verdy	J1 League	0	0	0	0	0	0	0	0
Singapore			League		Singapore Cup		League Cup		Total	
2001	Clementi Khalsa	S. League	20	6					20	6
Australia			League		Cup		League Cup		Total	
2001/02	Olympic Sharks	National Soccer League	12	0					12	0
2002/03	Olympic Sharks	National Soccer League	33	5					33	5
2003/04	Olympic Sharks	National Soccer League	20	2					20	2
2005/06	Perth Glory	A-League	16	1					16	1
Malaysia			League		Malaysia Cup		League Cup		Total	
2005/06	Johor	Premier League	5	0					5	0
Japan			League		Emperor's Cup		J.League Cup		Total	
2006	Ventforet Kofu	J1 League	0	0	0	0	0	0	0	0
2007	Sagan Tosu	J2 League	10	0	0	0	-		10	0
2008	Sagan Tosu	J2 League	9	2	0	0	-		9	2
2009	Fujieda MYFC	Prefectural Leagues	9	7	0	0	-		9	7
2010	Fujieda MYFC	Regional Leagues	15	3	0	0	-		15	3
2011	Fujieda MYFC	Regional Leagues	11	0	0	0	-		11	0
2012	Fujieda MYFC	Football League	11	0	0	0	-		11	0
2013	Fujieda MYFC	Football League	14	2	1	0	-		15	2
Country	Japan		70	11	1	0	0	0	71	11
Country	Singapore		20	6					20	6
Country	Australia		81	8					81	8
Country	Malaysia		5	0					5	0
Total			187	25	1	0	0	0	188	25
