= 1993 Kashima Antlers season =

Kashima Antlers
1993 season
- Chairman: 間中竣
- Manager: Masakatsu Miyamoto
- Stadium: Kashima Soccer Stadium
- J.League Suntory Series NICOS Series: Runners-up Champions 4th
- Emperor's Cup: Runners-up
- J.League Cup: GL-A 3rd
- Top goalscorer: League: Alcindo (22); All: Alcindo (28)
- Highest home attendance: 15,777 (vs Verdy Kawasaki, 23 June 1993)
- Lowest home attendance: 9,403 (vs Yokohama Flügels, 19 May 1993)
- Average home league attendance: 14,016
Home colours	Away colours

1993 Kashima Antlers season

== Review and events ==
Kashima Antlers won J.League Suntory series (first stage).

=== League results summary ===
Overall								Home						Away					
Pld	W	D	L	GF	GA	GD	Pts	W	D	L	GF	GA	GD	W	D	L	GF	GA	GD
36	23	0	13	72	43	+29	69	12	0	6	43	17	+26	11	0	7	29	26	+3

Source: J.LEAGUE OFFICIAL RECORD & DATA 1994. ISBN 4-09-102309-6.

=== League results by round ===
J.League Suntory series (first stage)
Round	1	2	3	4	5	6	7	8	9	10	11	12	13	14	15	16	17	18
Ground	H	H	A	A	H	H	A	H	A	A	A	H	A	A	H	A	H	H
Result	W	W	L	L	W	W	W	W	W	L	W	W	W	W	W	W	L	L
Position	1	1	1	4	2	1	1	1	1	1	1	1	1	1	1	1	1	1

Source: J.LEAGUE OFFICIAL RECORD & DATA 1994. ISBN 4-09-102309-6.
A = Away; H = Home; W = Win; D = Draw; L = Loss

J.League NICOS series (second stage)
Round	1	2	3	4	5	6	7	8	9	10	11	12	13	14	15	16	17	18
Ground	A	H	A	A	H	H	H	H	A	A	H	H	A	A	A	A	H	H
Result	W	W	L	L	L	L	W	W	W	L	L	W	W	W	W	L	W	L
Position	4	2	5	5	5	7	6	6	3	4	5	5	3	3	3	4	4	4

Source: J.LEAGUE OFFICIAL RECORD & DATA 1994. ISBN 4-09-102309-6.
A = Away; H = Home; W = Win; D = Draw; L = Loss

== Competitions ==
Competitions	Position
J.League	Runners-up / 10 clubs
Emperor's Cup	Runners-up
J.League Cup	GL-A 3rd / 7 clubs

== Domestic results ==
=== J.League ===
==== Suntory series ====
16 May 1993 1st-1	Kashima Antlers	5–0	Nagoya Grampus Eight	Kashima Soccer Stadium
16:00 JST (UTC+09)	Zico 25', 30', 63'; Alcindo 53', 64'	J. League		Attendance: 10,898; Referee: Masahiro Sogawa; Assistant referees: Hisashi Uemura, Masahiro Katagiri

19 May 1993 1st-2	Kashima Antlers	3–2	Yokohama Flügels	Kashima Soccer Stadium
19:01 JST (UTC+09)	Alcindo 23'; Carlos 35'; Hasegawa 79'	J. League	Maeda 53'; Edu 84'	Attendance: 9,403; Referee: Kiichirō Tachi; Assistant referees: Naotsugu Fuse, Kimio Izaki; Fourth official: Ryūichi Mogi

22 May 1993 1st-3	Shimizu S-Pulse	2–1	Kashima Antlers	Kusanagi Athletic Stadium
19:00 JST (UTC+09)	Toninho 57'; Horiike 72'	J. League	Carlos 49'	Attendance: 14,713; Referee: Kiyoshi Ōta; Assistant referees: Takeshi Ōkura, Yasushi Tsuchimoto; Fourth official: Takuji Fukazawa

26 May 1993 1st-4	Verdy Kawasaki	1–0 (a.s.d.e.t.)	Kashima Antlers	Kawasaki Todoroki Stadium
19:02 JST (UTC+09)	Miura 96'	J. League		Attendance: 9,816; Referee: Fumikazu Shioyazono; Assistant referees: Naotsugu Fuse, Kimio Izaki

29 May 1993 1st-5	Kashima Antlers	4–0	Gamba Osaka	Kashima Soccer Stadium
16:57 JST (UTC+09)	Santos 17'; Hasegawa 23', 71'; Alcindo 37'	J. League		Attendance: 14,058; Referee: Hideo Kikuchi; Assistant referees: Takashi Kunori, Masato Nogami; Fourth official: Ichirō Inukai

2 June 1993 1st-6	Kashima Antlers	2–1 (a.s.d.e.t.)	JEF United Ichihara	Kashima Soccer Stadium
19:00 JST (UTC+09)	Alcindo 24'; Carlos 91'	J. League	Makino 87'	Attendance: 15,194; Referee: Tetsuya Hamana; Assistant referees: Yū Nakamura, Hiroshi Fukuda; Fourth official: Ichirō Inukai

5 June 1993 1st-7	Yokohama Marinos	0–2	Kashima Antlers	Hakatanomori Athletic Stadium
18:30 JST (UTC+09)		J. League	Santos 14'; Alcindo 56'	Attendance: 28,595; Referee: Martin Bodenham; Assistant referees: Kōetsu Kikuchi, Hideaki Harada; Fourth official: Masatoshi Shibata

9 June 1993 1st-8	Kashima Antlers	3–1	Urawa Red Diamonds	Kashima Soccer Stadium
19:03 JST (UTC+09)	Kurosaki 2', 33'; Alcindo 59'	J. League	Fukuda 2'	Attendance: 15,050; Referee: Kōetsu Kikuchi; Assistant referees: Naotsugu Fuse, Masato Nogami; Fourth official: Ichirō Inukai

12 June 1993 1st-9	Sanfrecce Hiroshima	0–1	Kashima Antlers	Ehime Matsuyama Athletic Stadium
18:33 JST (UTC+09)		J. League	Kurosaki 36'	Attendance: 25,131; Referee: Hiroyuki Umemoto; Assistant referees: Sōichirō Kaneko, Hiroshi Tanabe

16 June 1993 1st-10	Yokohama Flügels	2–0	Kashima Antlers	Yokohama Mitsuzawa Football Stadium
19:02 JST (UTC+09)	Watanabe 9'; Aldro 71'	J. League		Attendance: 14,886; Referee: Fumikazu Shioyazono; Assistant referees: Noboru Ishiyama, Kazuaki Hamaguchi; Fourth official: Takashi Aoki

19 June 1993 1st-11	Nagoya Grampus Eight	0–4	Kashima Antlers	Nagoya Mizuho Football Stadium
19:02 JST (UTC+09)		J. League	Alcindo 18', 31', 57'; Hasegawa 78'	Attendance: 10,898; Referee: Yōtarō Moritsu; Assistant referees: Kazuya Yanagisawa, Yasushi Tsuchimoto; Fourth official: Takayoshi Kashino

23 June 1993 1st-12	Kashima Antlers	3–2	Verdy Kawasaki	Kashima Soccer Stadium
19:06 JST (UTC+09)	Santos 5'; Alcindo 27'; Koga 80'	J. League	Nagai 64'; Takeda 74'	Attendance: 15,777; Referee: Hitoshi Yamada; Assistant referees: Masato Nogami, Kimio Izaki; Fourth official: Ichirō Inukai

26 June 1993 1st-13	Gamba Osaka	2–4	Kashima Antlers	Expo '70 Commemorative Stadium
16:59 JST (UTC+09)	Müller 31'; Flavio 48' (pen.)	J. League	Santos 50'; Alcindo 52' (pen.); Hasegawa 63'; Kurosaki 76'	Attendance: 20,318; Referee: Martin Bodenham; Assistant referees: Yoshitsugu Katayama, Kazuo Kakihana; Fourth official: Sōichirō Kaneko

30 June 1993 1st-14	JEF United Ichihara	0–2	Kashima Antlers	Tochigi Utsunomiya Green Stadium
19:04 JST (UTC+09)		J. League	Kurosaki 29'; Ishii 52'	Attendance: 17,990; Referee: Masahiro Sogawa; Assistant referees: Toshiyuki Mayuzumi, Kazuaki Hamaguchi; Fourth official: Toshimitsu Yoshida

3 July 1993 1st-15	Kashima Antlers	3–1	Yokohama Marinos	Kashima Soccer Stadium
15:03 JST (UTC+09)	Kurosaki 18'; Alcindo 34', 77'	J. League	Jinno 79'	Attendance: 14,976; Referee: Kōetsu Kikuchi; Assistant referees: Hiroshi Fukuda, Masato Nogami; Fourth official: Ichirō Inukai

7 July 1993 1st-16	Urawa Red Diamonds	0–2	Kashima Antlers	Urawa Komaba Stadium
19:04 JST (UTC+09)		J. League	Ishii 9'; Kurosaki 55'	Attendance: 9,325; Referee: Martin Bodenham; Assistant referees: Tetsuya Hamana, Fumikazu Shioyazono; Fourth official: Morihiko Yamaji

10 July 1993 1st-17	Kashima Antlers	1–2 (a.s.d.e.t.)	Sanfrecce Hiroshima	Kashima Soccer Stadium
18:32 JST (UTC+09)	Hasegawa 71'	J. League	Černý 58'; Takagi 99'	Attendance: 15,055; Referee: Shizuo Takada; Assistant referees: Takashi Kunori, Kimio Izaki; Fourth official: Ichirō Inukai

14 July 1993 1st-18	Kashima Antlers	1–2	Shimizu S-Pulse	Kashima Soccer Stadium
19:03 JST (UTC+09)	Hasegawa 68'	J. League	Edu 61'; Tajima 84'	Attendance: 14,673; Referee: Martin Bodenham; Assistant referees: Kōetsu Kikuchi, Masato Nogami; Fourth official: Ryūichi Mogi

==== NICOS series ====
24 July 1993 2nd-1	Gamba Osaka	0–1 (a.s.d.e.t.)	Kashima Antlers	Expo '70 Commemorative Stadium
19:00 JST (UTC+09)		J. League	Santos 107'	Attendance: 22,677; Referee: Yōtarō Moritsu; Assistant referees: Morihisa Yamaguchi, Yoshikazu Hiroshima; Fourth official: Kazuo Kakihana

31 July 1993 2nd-2	Kashima Antlers	1–1 (a.s.d.e.t.) (5–3 p)	Nagoya Grampus Eight	Kashima Soccer Stadium
18:34 JST (UTC+09)	Santos 34'	J. League	Gotō 24'	Attendance: 14,747; Referee: Martin Bodenham; Assistant referees: Yū Nakamura, Noboru Ishiyama; Fourth official: Ichirō Inukai
	Penalties
	(penalty scored) Santos; (penalty scored) Kurosaki; (penalty scored) Akita; (penalty scored) Sugiyama; (penalty scored) Alcindo		(penalty scored) Fujikawa; (penalty missed) Sawairi; (penalty scored) Tsuruta; (penalty scored) Ogawa

4 August 1993 2nd-3	Verdy Kawasaki	2–1	Kashima Antlers	Kawasaki Todoroki Stadium
19:02 JST (UTC+09)	Miura 51'; Ramos 82'	J. League	Alcindo 39'	Attendance: 10,150; Referee: Fumikazu Shioyazono; Assistant referees: Hitoshi Yamada, Noboru Ishiyama; Fourth official: Masao Imamura

7 August 1993 2nd-4	Yokohama Marinos	1–1 (a.s.d.e.t.) (8–7 p)	Kashima Antlers	Yokohama Mitsuzawa Football Stadium
16:03 JST (UTC+09)	Miura 59'	J. League	Zico 30'	Attendance: 14,152; Referee: Hitoshi Yamada; Assistant referees: Yū Nakamura, Kimio Izaki; Fourth official: Kazuhiko Uchida
	Penalties
	(penalty scored) Ihara; (penalty scored) Bisconti; (penalty scored) Hirakawa; (penalty scored) Noda; (penalty scored) K. Kimura; (penalty scored) Koizumi; (penalty missed) Yamada; (penalty scored) Miura; (penalty scored) Nagayama		(penalty scored) Santos; (penalty scored) Kurosaki; (penalty scored) Akita; (penalty scored) Sugiyama; (penalty scored) Alcindo; (penalty scored) Gaya; (penalty missed) Honda; (penalty scored) Hasegawa; (penalty missed) Naitō

14 August 1993 2nd-5	Kashima Antlers	1–2	Yokohama Flügels	Kashima Soccer Stadium
18:31 JST (UTC+09)	Manaka 73'	J. League	Maeda 30'; Yamaguchi 48'	Attendance: 14,035; Referee: Masayoshi Okada; Assistant referees: Takeshi Ōkura, Masahiro Katagiri; Fourth official: Ichirō Inukai

20 August 1993 2nd-6	Kashima Antlers	0–1	Shimizu S-Pulse	Kashima Soccer Stadium
19:01 JST (UTC+09)		J. League	Mukōjima 32'	Attendance: 13,938; Referee: Kiichirō Tachi; Assistant referees: Toshiyuki Mayuzumi, Masato Nogami; Fourth official: Ichirō Inukai

25 August 1993 2nd-7	Kashima Antlers	4–3 (a.s.d.e.t.)	Sanfrecce Hiroshima	Kashima Soccer Stadium
19:04 JST (UTC+09)	Zico 33'; Kurosaki 47', 49'; Yoshida 115'	J. League	Takagi 5', 43'; Katanosaka 89'	Attendance: 13,923; Referee: Shizuo Takada; Assistant referees: Hisashi Uemura, Kazuaki Hamaguchi; Fourth official: Ichirō Inukai

28 August 1993 2nd-8	Kashima Antlers	2–0	Urawa Red Diamonds	Kashima Soccer Stadium
19:05 JST (UTC+09)	Yoshida 38'; Santos 66'	J. League		Attendance: 14,353; Referee: Kiyoshi Ōta; Assistant referees: Naotsugu Fuse, Masato Nogami; Fourth official: Masao Komada

3 September 1993 2nd-9	JEF United Ichihara	1–2 (a.s.d.e.t.)	Kashima Antlers	Ichihara Stadium
19:03 JST (UTC+09)	Pavel 52'	J. League	Hasegawa 84'; Zico 94'	Attendance: 10,467; Referee: Kōetsu Kikuchi; Assistant referees: Hiroshi Fukuda, Masahiro Katagiri; Fourth official: Fujirō Masukura

6 November 1993 2nd-10	Nagoya Grampus Eight	2–1	Kashima Antlers	Nagoya Mizuho Football Stadium
16:04 JST (UTC+09)	Sawairi 7'; Jorginho 61'	J. League	Manaka 77'	Attendance: 11,584; Referee: Yōtarō Moritsu; Assistant referees: Kazuya Yanagisawa, Yoshimi Ogawa; Fourth official: Takayoshi Kashino

10 November 1993 2nd-11	Kashima Antlers	3–4 (a.s.d.e.t.)	Gamba Osaka	Kashima Soccer Stadium
19:03 JST (UTC+09)	53' (o.g.); Alcindo 73'; Hasegawa 89'	J. League	Nagashima 10'; Isogai 59'; Matsunami 89'; Minobe 117'	Attendance: 13,417; Referee: Kiichirō Tachi; Assistant referees: Toshiyuki Mayuzumi, Takashi Kunori; Fourth official: Ichirō Inukai

13 November 1993 2nd-12	Kashima Antlers	3–2	Yokohama Marinos	Kashima Soccer Stadium
19:03 JST (UTC+09)	Alcindo 21', 69'; Zico 77'	J. League	Díaz 0', 19'	Attendance: 14,235; Referee: Hideo Kikuchi; Assistant referees: Hiroshi Fukuda, Masahiro Katagiri; Fourth official: Ichirō Inukai

17 November 1993 2nd-13	Yokohama Flügels	2–3 (a.s.d.e.t.)	Kashima Antlers	Kumamoto Suizenji Stadium
19:01 JST (UTC+09)	Amarilla 48'; Edu 87' (pen.)	J. League	Zico 39'; Alcindo 75' (pen.); Manaka 114'	Attendance: 14,186; Referee: Kōetsu Kikuchi; Assistant referees: Hideaki Harada, Satoru Ishizawa; Fourth official: Tōru Yamashiro

20 November 1993 2nd-14	Shimizu S-Pulse	0–2	Kashima Antlers	Nihondaira Sports Stadium
15:00 JST (UTC+09)		J. League	Kurosaki 47', 80'	Attendance: 9,231; Referee: Juan Carlos Crespi; Assistant referees: Tatsumi Ōno, Kimio Izaki; Fourth official: Masami Urayama

27 November 1993 2nd-15	Sanfrecce Hiroshima	0–1	Kashima Antlers	Hiroshima Big Arch
14:02 JST (UTC+09)		J. League	Zico 22'	Attendance: 29,091; Referee: Masayoshi Okada; Assistant referees: Masanori Watanabe, Hiroshi Tanabe; Fourth official: Naoki Esumi

1 December 1993 2nd-16	Urawa Red Diamonds	2–1 (a.s.d.e.t.)	Kashima Antlers	Urawa Komaba Stadium
19:02 JST (UTC+09)	Rummenigge 4'; Motoyoshi 104'	J. League	Santos 43'	Attendance: 9,256; Referee: Tatsumi Ōno; Assistant referees: Toshiyuki Mayuzumi, Kazuaki Hamaguchi; Fourth official: Keiji Kamiara

8 December 1993 2nd-17	Kashima Antlers	3–0	JEF United Ichihara	Kashima Soccer Stadium
19:02 JST (UTC+09)	Alcindo 4', 81'; Ōno 27'	J. League		Attendance: 13,282; Referee: Kiyoshi Ōta; Assistant referees: Hiroshi Fukuda, Takashi Kunori; Fourth official: Ichirō Inukai

15 December 1993 2nd-18	Kashima Antlers	1–2	Verdy Kawasaki	Kashima Soccer Stadium
19:03 JST (UTC+09)	Alcindo 23'	J. League	Ishikawa 27'; Miura 68'	Attendance: 15,277; Referee: Juan Carlos Crespi; Assistant referees: Hiroshi Fukuda, Takashi Kunori; Fourth official: Ichirō Inukai

==== J.League Championship ====
9 January 1994 1	Kashima Antlers	0–2	Verdy Kawasaki	Tokyo National Stadium
13:05 JST (UTC+09)		J. League	Miura 60'; Bismarck 89'	Attendance: 53,553; Referee: Kenji Tanaka; Assistant referees: Morihisa Yamaguchi, Hiroyuki Umemoto; Fourth official: Shinichirō Obata

16 January 1994 2	Verdy Kawasaki	1–1 (3–1 agg.)	Kashima Antlers	Tokyo National Stadium
13:03 JST (UTC+09)	Miura 82' (pen.)	J. League	Alcindo 38'	Attendance: 53,010; Referee: Shizuo Takada; Assistant referees: Fumikazu Shioyazono, Yū Nakamura; Fourth official: Yoshimi Ogawa

=== Emperor's Cup ===
5 December 1993 1st Round	Kashima Antlers	1–1 (a.e.t.) (3–2 p)	NKK	Miyagi Athletic Stadium
: JST (UTC+09)	Akita 29'		Márcio 21'

11 December 1993 2nd Round	Kashima Antlers	6–1	Tohoku Electric Power	Kashima Soccer Stadium
: JST (UTC+09)	Hasegawa 23', 54'; Alcindo 62'; Zico 72', 77'; Kurosaki 83'		FW. Satō (佐藤樹) 21'

19 December 1993 Quarterfinals	Kashima Antlers	5–3 (a.e.t.)	Nagoya Grampus Eight	Expo '70 Commemorative Stadium
: JST (UTC+09)	Alcindo 39', 70'; Hasegawa 49', 100'; Kurosaki 92'		Moriyama 6'; Mori 25'; Asano 36'	Attendance: 19,409

23 December 1993 Semifinals	Kashima Antlers	1–0	Shimizu S-Pulse	Tokyo National Stadium
13:09 JST (UTC+09)	Akita 69'

1 January 1994 Final	Kashima Antlers	2–6 (a.e.t.)	Yokohama Flügels	Tokyo National Stadium
: JST (UTC+09)	Kurosaki 6'; Okuno 89'		Edu 44' (pen.), 63' (pen.); Watanabe 112'; Amarilla 115', 118'; Sorimachi 119'	Attendance: 53,540; Referee: Masayoshi Okada

=== J.League Cup ===
11 September 1993 GL-A-1	Verdy Kawasaki	1–1 (a.s.d.e.t.) (2–4 p)	Kashima Antlers	Kawasaki Todoroki Stadium
18:31 JST (UTC+09)	Bismarck 25'	J. League	Hasegawa 72'	Attendance: 10,092; Referee: Kiichirō Tachi; Assistant referees: Keiichi Sunakawa, Hiroshi Fukuda; Fourth official: Kazuhiko Uchida
	Penalties
	(penalty scored) Nagai; (penalty scored) Kikuhara; (penalty missed) Bismarck; (penalty missed) Kawamoto		(penalty scored) Santos; (penalty scored) Zico; (penalty scored) Akita; (penalty scored) Sugiyama

GL-A-2	bye

18 September 1993 GL-A-3	Kashima Antlers	1–0	JEF United Ichihara	Kashima Soccer Stadium
18:33 JST (UTC+09)	Hasegawa 52'	J. League		Attendance: 14,571; Referee: Shizuo Takada; Assistant referees: Masahiro Katagiri, Masato Nogami; Fourth official: Ichirō Inukai

25 September 1993 GL-A-4	Gamba Osaka	3–4	Kashima Antlers	Kobe Universiade Memorial Stadium
19:02 JST (UTC+09)	44' (o.g.); Aleinikov 50'; Nagashima 82'	J. League	Alcindo 29'; Gaya 35'; Carlos 51'; Hasegawa 57'	Attendance: 40,795; Referee: Hiroyuki Umemoto; Assistant referees: Yoshikazu Hiroshima, Sōichirō Kaneko; Fourth official: Yasuhiro Hemmi

2 October 1993 GL-A-5	Kashima Antlers	1–2	Sanfrecce Hiroshima	Kashima Soccer Stadium
18:34 JST (UTC+09)	Manaka 34'	J. League	Wakamatsu 47'; Yokouchi 59'	Attendance: 14,587; Referee: Juan Carlos Crespi; Assistant referees: Hiroshi Fukuda, Takashi Kunori; Fourth official: Ichirō Inukai

9 October 1993 GL-A-6	Kashiwa Reysol	1–1 (a.s.d.e.t.) (3–2 p)	Kashima Antlers	Kashiwa Hitachi Stadium
18:30 JST (UTC+09)	Careca 22'	J. League	Alcindo 50' (pen.)	Attendance: 14,858; Referee: Masayoshi Okada; Assistant referees: Hiroshi Fukuda, Takeshi Ōkura; Fourth official: Kazuya Isokawa
	Penalties
	(penalty scored) Careca; (penalty scored) Ailton; (penalty scored) Nelsinho; (penalty missed) Ōkuma		(penalty missed) Santos; (penalty scored) Carlos; (penalty missed) Akita; (penalty scored) Sugiyama; (penalty missed) Alcindo

16 October 1993 GL-A-7	Kashima Antlers	2–1	Shonan Bellmare	Kashima Soccer Stadium
18:33 JST (UTC+09)	Zico 44'; Akita 55'	J. League	Betinho 39'	Attendance: 14,729; Referee: Hideo Kikuchi; Assistant referees: Keiichi Sunakawa, Masato Nogami; Fourth official: Ichirō Inukai

== Player statistics ==
No.	Pos	Nat	Player	Total		J-League		J.Championship		Emperor's Cup		J-League Cup	
No.	Pos	Nat	Player	Apps	Goals	Apps	Goals	Apps	Goals	Apps	Goals	Apps	Goals
	GK	(Japan) JPN	Osamu Chiba	3	0	0	0	0	0	0	0	3	0
	GK	(Japan) JPN	Masaaki Furukawa	46	0	36	0	2	0	5	0	3	0
	GK	(Japan) JPN	Yōhei Satō	0	0	0	0	0	0	0	0	0	0
	GK	(Japan) JPN	Hideaki Ozawa	0	0	0	0	0	0	0	0	0	0
	DF	(Japan) JPN	Makoto Sugiyama	33	0	26	0	1	0	0	0	6	0
	DF	(Japan) JPN	Shunzo Ōno	42	1	35	1	2	0	5	0	0	0
	DF	(Japan) JPN	Masatada Ishii	30	2	22	2	2	0	1	0	5	0
	DF	(Japan) JPN	Kenji Ōba	15	0	9	0	0	0	5	0	1	0
	DF	(Japan) JPN	Masami Akazawa	0	0	0	0	0	0	0	0	0	0
	DF	(Japan) JPN	Ryōsuke Okuno	23	1	11	0	1	0	5	1	6	0
	DF	(Japan) JPN	Eiji Gaya	35	1	27	0	2	0	0	0	6	1
	DF	(Japan) JPN	Yutaka Akita	47	3	35	0	2	0	5	2	5	1
	DF	(Japan) JPN	Kazuhisa Irii	9	0	6	0	1	0	0	0	2	0
	DF	(Japan) JPN	Takahiro Kawaji	0	0	0	0	0	0	0	0	0	0
	DF	(Japan) JPN	Yoshikazu Fujimoto	0	0	0	0	0	0	0	0	0	0
	DF	(Japan) JPN	Kenichi Serata	0	0	0	0	0	0	0	0	0	0
	DF	(Japan) JPN	Ichiei Muroi	0	0	0	0	0	0	0	0	0	0
	DF	(Japan) JPN	Masafumi Mizuki	0	0	0	0	0	0	0	0	0	0
	DF	(Japan) JPN	Taijirō Kurita	0	0	0	0	0	0	0	0	0	0
	MF	(Brazil) BRA	Zico	24	12	16	9	1	0	4	2	3	1
	MF	(Brazil) BRA	Santos	45	8	32	8	2	0	5	0	6	0
	MF	(Brazil) BRA	Alcindo	40	28	28	22	2	1	5	3	5	2
	MF	(Japan) JPN	Yasuto Honda	48	0	35	0	2	0	5	0	6	0
	MF	(Japan) JPN	Yasuhiro Yoshida	20	2	13	2	1	0	5	0	1	0
	MF	(Brazil) BRA	Carlos	14	4	11	3	0	0	0	0	3	1
	MF	(Brazil) BRA	Regis	8	0	8	0	0	0	0	0	0	0
	MF	(Japan) JPN	Tadatoshi Masuda	0	0	0	0	0	0	0	0	0	0
	MF	(Japan) JPN	Tōru Oniki	0	0	0	0	0	0	0	0	0	0
	FW	(Japan) JPN	Naruyuki Naitō	4	0	4	0	0	0	0	0	0	0
	FW	(Japan) JPN	Hisashi Kurosaki	37	14	30	11	2	0	5	3	0	0
	FW	(Japan) JPN	Yoshiyuki Hasegawa	42	16	30	9	2	0	5	4	5	3
	FW	(Japan) JPN	Satoshi Koga	21	1	15	1	0	0	1	0	5	0
	FW	(Japan) JPN	Yasuo Manaka	15	4	12	3	0	0	1	0	2	1
	FW	(Japan) JPN	Kenji Okamoto	0	0	0	0	0	0	0	0	0	0
	FW	(Japan) JPN	Kōji Takeda	0	0	0	0	0	0	0	0	0	0
	FW	(Japan) JPN	Masaaki Ueki	0	0	0	0	0	0	0	0	0	0

== Transfers ==
In:

No.	Pos.	Nation	Player
—	DF	JPN	Ryōsuke Okuno (from Waseda University)
—	DF	JPN	Yutaka Akita (from Aichi Gakuin University)
—	MF	BRA	Alcindo Sartori (from Grêmio)
—	DF	JPN	Ichiei Muroi (from Bunan Senior High School)
—	DF	JPN	Masafumi Mizuki (from Miyazaki Kogyo High School)
—	DF	JPN	Taijirō Kurita (from Shizuoka Gakuen Senior High School)
—	MF	JPN	Tōru Oniki (from Funabashi Municipal High School)
—	FW	JPN	Masaaki Ueki (from Mito Tanki Daigaku fuzoku High School)

Out:

No.	Pos.	Nation	Player
—	DF	JPN	Toshiaki Okutomo
—	MF	JPN	Yūman Jō
—	FW	BRA	Milton
—	DF	JPN	Seiichi Negishi
—	MF	JPN	Makoto Teguramori
—	MF	JPN	Masayoshi Hirano
—	MF	JPN	Isamu Fukui
—	FW	JPN	Jōkō Emoto
—	FW	JPN	Hiroshi Teguramori
—	FW	JPN	Katsuhiro Yamaki
—	FW	JPN	Ken Kakita

== Awards ==
- J.League Best XI: (Japan) Shunzo Ōno, (Brazil) Santos, (Japan) Yasuto Honda

== Other pages ==
- (in Japanese) J. League official site
- (in Japanese) Kashima Antlers official site
