= Fabinho (footballer, born 1974) =

Brazilian footballer

Personal information
- Full name: Fabio Augusto Justino
- Date of birth: June 16, 1974 (age 52)
- Place of birth: Brazil
- Height: 1.67 m (5 ft 5 1/2 in)
- Position: Forward

Senior career*
Years	Team	Apps	(Gls)
1998–2000	Shimizu S-Pulse		
2000	Vissel Kobe		
- * Club domestic league appearances and goals

Fabio Augusto Justino (born June 16, 1974), known as Fabinho, is a former Brazilian football player.

== Club statistics ==
Club performance			League		Cup		League Cup		Total	
Season	Club	League	Apps	Goals	Apps	Goals	Apps	Goals	Apps	Goals
Japan			League		Emperor's Cup		J.League Cup		Total	
1998	Shimizu S-Pulse	J1 League	19	5	5	2	5	3	29	10
1999	Shimizu S-Pulse	J1 League	20	4	3	0	4	1	27	5
2000	Shimizu S-Pulse	J1 League	17	2	0	0	4	1	21	3
2000	Vissel Kobe	J1 League	3	0	1	0	0	0	4	0
Total			59	11	9	2	13	5	71	18
