= 1999 Shimizu S-Pulse season =

Shimizu S-Pulse
1999 season
- Manager: Steve Perryman
- Stadium: Nihondaira Sports Stadium
- J.League 1: Runners-up
- Emperor's Cup: Quarterfinals
- J.League Cup: Quarterfinals
- Top goalscorer: Yoshikiyo Kuboyama (12)
Home colours	Away colours

The 1999 season was Shimizu S-Pulse's eighth season in existence and their seventh season in the J1 League. The club also competed in the Emperor's Cup and the J.League Cup. The team finished the season second in the league.

== Competitions ==
Competitions	Position
J.League 1	Runners-up / 16 clubs
Emperor's Cup	Quarterfinals
J.League Cup	Quarterfinals

== Domestic results ==
=== J.League 1 ===
6 March 1999 1-1	Shimizu S-Pulse	3-1	Verdy Kawasaki	Nihondaira Sports Stadium
JST (UTC+09)

13 March 1999 1-2	Bellmare Hiratsuka	0-1	Shimizu S-Pulse	Hiratsuka Athletics Stadium
JST (UTC+09)

20 March 1999 1-3	Shimizu S-Pulse	1-0	Kyoto Purple Sanga	Nihondaira Sports Stadium
JST (UTC+09)

27 March 1999 1-4	Kashiwa Reysol	1-2 (GG) (a.e.t.)	Shimizu S-Pulse	Hitachi Kashiwa Soccer Stadium
JST (UTC+09)

3 April 1999 1-5	Shimizu S-Pulse	2-3	Yokohama F. Marinos	Nihondaira Sports Stadium
JST (UTC+09)

10 April 1999 1-6	Avispa Fukuoka	1-3	Shimizu S-Pulse	Hakatanomori Football Stadium
JST (UTC+09)

17 April 1999 1-7	Cerezo Osaka	2-1	Shimizu S-Pulse	Osaka Nagai Stadium
JST (UTC+09)

24 April 1999 1-8	Shimizu S-Pulse	2-5	Júbilo Iwata	Nihondaira Sports Stadium
JST (UTC+09)

28 April 1999 1-9	Kashima Antlers	0-1	Shimizu S-Pulse	Tokyo National Stadium
JST (UTC+09)

1 May 1999 1-10	Shimizu S-Pulse	2-2 (GG) (a.e.t.)	Urawa Red Diamonds	Nihondaira Sports Stadium
JST (UTC+09)

5 May 1999 1-11	Nagoya Grampus Eight	3-4	Shimizu S-Pulse	Gifu Nagaragawa Stadium
JST (UTC+09)

8 May 1999 1-12	Shimizu S-Pulse	2-1	Gamba Osaka	Nihondaira Sports Stadium
JST (UTC+09)

15 May 1999 1-13	JEF United Ichihara	2-3	Shimizu S-Pulse	Ichihara Seaside Stadium
JST (UTC+09)

22 May 1999 1-14	Shimizu S-Pulse	1-0	Vissel Kobe	Nihondaira Sports Stadium
JST (UTC+09)

29 May 1999 1-15	Sanfrecce Hiroshima	2-0	Shimizu S-Pulse	Hiroshima Big Arch
JST (UTC+09)

7 August 1999 2-1	Shimizu S-Pulse	2-3 (GG) (a.e.t.)	Cerezo Osaka	Nihondaira Sports Stadium
JST (UTC+09)

14 August 1999 2-2	Júbilo Iwata	0-1	Shimizu S-Pulse	Júbilo Iwata Stadium
JST (UTC+09)

18 August 1999 2-3	Shimizu S-Pulse	2-0	Kashima Antlers	Nihondaira Sports Stadium
JST (UTC+09)

21 August 1999 2-4	Urawa Red Diamonds	0-3	Shimizu S-Pulse	Tokyo National Stadium
JST (UTC+09)

28 August 1999 2-5	Shimizu S-Pulse	4-3	Nagoya Grampus Eight	Nihondaira Sports Stadium
JST (UTC+09)

4 September 1999 2-6	Gamba Osaka	1-0	Shimizu S-Pulse	Osaka Expo '70 Stadium
JST (UTC+09)

11 September 1999 2-7	Shimizu S-Pulse	2-1 (GG) (a.e.t.)	JEF United Ichihara	Nihondaira Sports Stadium
JST (UTC+09)

15 September 1999 2-8	Vissel Kobe	1-2	Shimizu S-Pulse	Kobe Universiade Memorial Stadium
JST (UTC+09)

18 September 1999 2-9	Shimizu S-Pulse	2-0	Sanfrecce Hiroshima	Nihondaira Sports Stadium
JST (UTC+09)

23 September 1999 2-10	Verdy Kawasaki	0-2	Shimizu S-Pulse	Todoroki Athletics Stadium
JST (UTC+09)

30 October 1999 2-11	Kyoto Purple Sanga	0-2	Shimizu S-Pulse	Nishikyogoku Athletic Stadium
JST (UTC+09)

17 November 1999 2-12	Shimizu S-Pulse	2-1	Bellmare Hiratsuka	Nihondaira Sports Stadium
JST (UTC+09)

20 November 1999 2-13	Shimizu S-Pulse	1-0	Avispa Fukuoka	Nihondaira Sports Stadium
JST (UTC+09)

23 November 1999 2-14	Yokohama F. Marinos	1-2	Shimizu S-Pulse	International Stadium Yokohama
JST (UTC+09)

27 November 1999 2-15	Shimizu S-Pulse	1-2	Kashiwa Reysol	Nihondaira Sports Stadium
JST (UTC+09)

=== Emperor's Cup ===
1st Round	bye

2nd Round	bye

12 December 1999 3rd Round	Shimizu S-Pulse	2-1	Senshu University	Nihondaira Sports Stadium
JST (UTC+09)

19 December 1999 4th Round	Shimizu S-Pulse	2-2 (GG) (a.e.t.) (4-2 p)	Kyoto Purple Sanga	Nagasaki Athletic Stadium
JST (UTC+09)

23 December 1999 Quarterfinals	Shimizu S-Pulse	0-2	Sanfrecce Hiroshima	Sendai Stadium
JST (UTC+09)

=== J.League Cup ===
1st Round	bye

12 June 1999 2nd Round-1	Kyoto Purple Sanga	1-0	Shimizu S-Pulse	Nishikyogoku Athletic Stadium
JST (UTC+09)

19 June 1999 2nd Round-2	Shimizu S-Pulse	2-0 (GG) (a.e.t.) (2-1 agg.)	Kyoto Purple Sanga	Nihondaira Sports Stadium
JST (UTC+09)

20 July 1999 Quarterfinals-1	Nagoya Grampus Eight	3-2	Shimizu S-Pulse	Mizuho Athletic Stadium
JST (UTC+09)

24 July 1999 Quarterfinals-2	Shimizu S-Pulse	0-0 (2-3 agg.)	Nagoya Grampus Eight	Nihondaira Sports Stadium
JST (UTC+09)

== Player statistics ==
No.	Pos.	Nat.	Player	D.o.B. (Age)	Height / Weight	J.League 1		Emperor's Cup		J.League Cup		Total	
No.	Pos.	Nat.	Player	D.o.B. (Age)	Height / Weight	Apps	Goals	Apps	Goals	Apps	Goals	Apps	Goals
1	GK	(Japan)	Masanori Sanada	March 6, 1968 (aged 31)	cm / kg	30	0						
2	DF	(Japan)	Toshihide Saito	April 20, 1973 (aged 25)	cm / kg	28	3						
3	DF	(Japan)	Masahiro Ando	April 2, 1972 (aged 26)	cm / kg	16	2						
4	MF	(Japan)	Kazuyuki Toda	December 30, 1977 (aged 21)	cm / kg	28	0						
5	MF	(Brazil)	Santos	December 9, 1960 (aged 38)	cm / kg	27	1						
6	MF	(Japan)	Katsumi Oenoki	April 3, 1965 (aged 33)	cm / kg	9	0						
7	MF	(Japan)	Teruyoshi Ito	August 31, 1974 (aged 24)	cm / kg	29	1						
8	MF	(Brazil)	Alessandro Santos	July 20, 1977 (aged 21)	cm / kg	30	11						
9	FW	(Japan)	Kenta Hasegawa	September 25, 1965 (aged 33)	cm / kg	21	2						
10	MF	(Japan)	Masaaki Sawanobori	January 12, 1970 (aged 29)	cm / kg	28	9						
11	DF	(Japan)	Ryuzo Morioka	October 7, 1975 (aged 23)	cm / kg	26	1						
12	FW	(Brazil)	Fabinho	June 16, 1974 (aged 24)	cm / kg	20	4						
13	MF	(Japan)	Kazuaki Tasaka	August 3, 1971 (aged 27)	cm / kg	13	2						
14	FW	(Japan)	Hiroki Hattori	August 30, 1971 (aged 27)	cm / kg	10	1						
15	FW	(Japan)	Yoshikiyo Kuboyama	July 21, 1976 (aged 22)	cm / kg	27	12						
16	GK	(Japan)	Koji Nakahara	July 27, 1970 (aged 28)	cm / kg	0	0						
17	DF	(Japan)	Yuzo Wada	May 2, 1980 (aged 18)	cm / kg	0	0						
18	MF	(Japan)	Daizo Okitsu	June 15, 1974 (aged 24)	cm / kg	0	0						
19	MF	(Japan)	Kohei Hiramatsu	April 19, 1980 (aged 18)	cm / kg	1	0						
20	GK	(Japan)	Keisuke Hada	February 20, 1978 (aged 21)	cm / kg	0	0						
21	FW	(Japan)	Sotaro Yasunaga	April 20, 1976 (aged 22)	cm / kg	29	5						
22	DF	(Japan)	Junji Nishizawa	May 10, 1974 (aged 24)	cm / kg	8	1						
23	FW	(Japan)	Hiroyuki Ishida	August 31, 1979 (aged 19)	cm / kg	0	0						
24	GK	(Japan)	Yosuke Nozawa	November 9, 1979 (aged 19)	cm / kg	0	0						
25	DF	(Japan)	Daisuke Ichikawa	May 14, 1980 (aged 18)	cm / kg	22	0						
26	DF	(Japan)	Tsuyoshi Tanikawa	April 25, 1980 (aged 18)	cm / kg	1	0						
27	FW	(Japan)	Hitoshi Matsushima	April 30, 1980 (aged 18)	cm / kg	0	0						
28	MF	(Japan)	Nobuhiro Naito	May 25, 1978 (aged 20)	cm / kg	0	0						
29	MF	(Japan)	Hisaaki Kobayashi	September 20, 1978 (aged 20)	cm / kg	0	0						
33	DF	(Japan)	Takumi Horiike	September 6, 1965 (aged 33)	cm / kg	0	0						

== Other pages ==
- (in Japanese) J.League official site
