= 1998 Shimizu S-Pulse season =

Shimizu S-Pulse
1998 season
- Manager: Osvaldo Ardiles; Steve Perryman
- Stadium: Nihondaira Sports Stadium
- J.League: 3rd
- Emperor's Cup: Runners-up
- J.League Cup: Semifinals
- Top goalscorer: Oliva (21)
| Home colours | Away colours |

The 1998 season was Shimizu S-Pulse's seventh season in existence and their sixth season in the J1 League. The club also competed in the Emperor's Cup and the J.League Cup. The team finished the season third in the league.

== Competitions ==
| Competitions | Position |
|---|---|
| J.League | 3rd / 18 clubs |
| Emperor's Cup | 2nd |
| J.League Cup | Semifinals |

== Domestic results ==
=== J.League ===
| 21 March 1998 1-1 | Shimizu S-Pulse | 4-1 | Consadole Sapporo | Nihondaira Sports Stadium |
| JST (UTC+09) |

| 25 March 1998 1-2 | Kyoto Purple Sanga | 1-0 | Shimizu S-Pulse | Nishikyogoku Athletic Stadium |
| JST (UTC+09) |

| 28 March 1998 1-3 | Kashima Antlers | 3-2 | Shimizu S-Pulse | Kashima Soccer Stadium |
| JST (UTC+09) |

| 4 April 1998 1-4 | Shimizu S-Pulse | 0-2 | Kashiwa Reysol | Nihondaira Sports Stadium |
| JST (UTC+09) |

| 11 April 1998 1-5 | Gamba Osaka | 1-2 | Shimizu S-Pulse | Osaka Expo '70 Stadium |
| JST (UTC+09) |

| 15 April 1998 1-6 | Shimizu S-Pulse | 1-0 | Yokohama Marinos | Nihondaira Sports Stadium |
| JST (UTC+09) |

| 18 April 1998 1-7 | Urawa Red Diamonds | 0-2 | Shimizu S-Pulse | Urawa Komaba Stadium |
| JST (UTC+09) |

| 25 April 1998 1-8 | Shimizu S-Pulse | 3-1 | Nagoya Grampus Eight | Nihondaira Sports Stadium |
| JST (UTC+09) |

| 29 April 1998 1-9 | Bellmare Hiratsuka | 1-2 | Shimizu S-Pulse | Hiratsuka Athletics Stadium |
| JST (UTC+09) |

| 2 May 1998 1-10 | Shimizu S-Pulse | 2-1 | Júbilo Iwata | Nihondaira Sports Stadium |
| JST (UTC+09) |

| 5 May 1998 1-11 | Verdy Kawasaki | 2-0 | Shimizu S-Pulse | Todoroki Athletics Stadium |
| JST (UTC+09) |

| 9 May 1998 1-12 | Shimizu S-Pulse | 4-0 | Vissel Kobe | Nihondaira Sports Stadium |
| JST (UTC+09) |

| 25 July 1998 1-13 | JEF United Ichihara | 0-1 | Shimizu S-Pulse | Ichihara Seaside Stadium |
| JST (UTC+09) |

| 29 July 1998 1-14 | Shimizu S-Pulse | 2-0 | Yokohama Flügels | Nihondaira Sports Stadium |
| JST (UTC+09) |

| 1 August 1998 1-15 | Cerezo Osaka | 1-3 | Shimizu S-Pulse | Osaka Nagai Stadium |
| JST (UTC+09) |

| 5 August 1998 1-16 | Shimizu S-Pulse | 1-0 | Sanfrecce Hiroshima | Nihondaira Sports Stadium |
| JST (UTC+09) |

| 8 August 1998 1-17 | Avispa Fukuoka | 0-3 | Shimizu S-Pulse | Hakatanomori Football Stadium |
| JST (UTC+09) |

| 22 August 1998 2-1 | Yokohama Flügels | 2-4 | Shimizu S-Pulse | International Stadium Yokohama |
| JST (UTC+09) |

| 29 August 1998 2-2 | Shimizu S-Pulse | 1-2 | Cerezo Osaka | Nihondaira Sports Stadium |
| JST (UTC+09) |

| 5 September 1998 2-3 | Sanfrecce Hiroshima | 2-2 (GG) (a.e.t.) (8-7 p) | Shimizu S-Pulse | Hiroshima Big Arch |
| JST (UTC+09) |

| 12 September 1998 2-4 | Shimizu S-Pulse | 6-0 | Avispa Fukuoka | Nihondaira Sports Stadium |
| JST (UTC+09) |

| 15 September 1998 2-5 | Consadole Sapporo | 1-2 (GG) (a.e.t.) | Shimizu S-Pulse | Sapporo Atsubetsu Park Stadium |
| JST (UTC+09) |

| 19 September 1998 2-6 | Shimizu S-Pulse | 3-2 | Kyoto Purple Sanga | Nihondaira Sports Stadium |
| JST (UTC+09) |

| 23 September 1998 2-7 | Shimizu S-Pulse | 1-2 | Kashima Antlers | Nihondaira Sports Stadium |
| JST (UTC+09) |

| 26 September 1998 2-8 | Kashiwa Reysol | 1-2 | Shimizu S-Pulse | Hitachi Kashiwa Soccer Stadium |
| JST (UTC+09) |

| 3 October 1998 2-9 | Shimizu S-Pulse | 4-1 | Gamba Osaka | Nihondaira Sports Stadium |
| JST (UTC+09) |

| 14 October 1998 2-10 | Yokohama Marinos | 3-4 (GG) (a.e.t.) | Shimizu S-Pulse | Yokohama Mitsuzawa Stadium |
| JST (UTC+09) |

| 17 October 1998 2-11 | Shimizu S-Pulse | 1-0 (GG) (a.e.t.) | Urawa Red Diamonds | Nihondaira Sports Stadium |
| JST (UTC+09) |

| 21 October 1998 2-12 | Nagoya Grampus Eight | 0-2 | Shimizu S-Pulse | Mizuho Athletic Stadium |
| JST (UTC+09) |

| 24 October 1998 2-13 | Shimizu S-Pulse | 3-0 | Bellmare Hiratsuka | Nihondaira Sports Stadium |
| JST (UTC+09) |

| 31 October 1998 2-14 | Júbilo Iwata | 1-0 | Shimizu S-Pulse | Júbilo Iwata Stadium |
| JST (UTC+09) |

| 3 November 1998 2-15 | Shimizu S-Pulse | 0-0 (GG) (a.e.t.) (4-2 p) | Verdy Kawasaki | Nihondaira Sports Stadium |
| JST (UTC+09) |

| 7 November 1998 2-16 | Vissel Kobe | 3-0 | Shimizu S-Pulse | Kobe Universiade Memorial Stadium |
| JST (UTC+09) |

| 14 November 1998 2-17 | Shimizu S-Pulse | 4-1 | JEF United Ichihara | Nihondaira Sports Stadium |
| JST (UTC+09) |

=== Emperor's Cup ===
| 1st Round | bye |

| 2nd Round | bye |

| 13 December 1998 3rd Round | Shimizu S-Pulse | 5-0 | Mito HollyHock | Nihondaira Sports Stadium |
| JST (UTC+09) |

| 20 December 1998 4th Round | Avispa Fukuoka | 2-3 | Shimizu S-Pulse | Nihondaira Sports Stadium |
| JST (UTC+09) |

| 23 December 1998 Quarterfinals | Urawa Red Diamonds | 0-1 | Shimizu S-Pulse | Kagawa Marugame Stadium |
| JST (UTC+09) |

| 27 December 1998 Semifinals | Nagoya Grampus Eight | 1-2 (GG) (a.e.t.) | Shimizu S-Pulse | International Stadium Yokohama |
| JST (UTC+09) |

| 1 January 1999 Final | Yokohama Flügels | 2-1 | Shimizu S-Pulse | Tokyo National Stadium |
| JST (UTC+09) |

=== J.League Cup ===
| 16 May 1998 GL-C-1 | Shimizu S-Pulse | 2-0 | Consadole Sapporo | Nihondaira Sports Stadium |
| JST (UTC+09) |

| 23 May 1998 GL-C-2 | Kawasaki Frontale | 0-1 | Shimizu S-Pulse | Todoroki Athletics Stadium |
| JST (UTC+09) |

| GL-C-3 | bye |

| 3 June 1998 GL-C-4 | Shimizu S-Pulse | 2-0 | Gamba Osaka | Nihondaira Sports Stadium |
| JST (UTC+09) |

| 6 June 1998 GL-C-5 | Yokohama Flügels | 2-3 | Shimizu S-Pulse | Yokohama Mitsuzawa Stadium |
| JST (UTC+09) |

| 15 July 1998 Semifinals | Shimizu S-Pulse | 0-2 | Júbilo Iwata | Nihondaira Sports Stadium |
| JST (UTC+09) |

== Player statistics ==
| No. | Pos. | Nat. | Player | D.o.B. (Age) | Height / Weight | J.League | | Emperor's Cup | | J.League Cup | | Total | |
| No. | Pos. | Nat. | Player | D.o.B. (Age) | Height / Weight | Apps | Goals | Apps | Goals | Apps | Goals | Apps | Goals |
|---|---|---|---|---|---|---|---|---|---|---|---|---|---|
| 1 | GK | (Japan) | Masanori Sanada | March 6, 1968 (aged 30) | cm / kg | 34 | 0 | | | | | | |
| 2 | DF | (Japan) | Toshihide Saito | April 20, 1973 (aged 24) | cm / kg | 33 | 0 | | | | | | |
| 3 | DF | (Japan) | Masahiro Ando | April 2, 1972 (aged 25) | cm / kg | 30 | 2 | | | | | | |
| 4 | DF | (Japan) | Takumi Horiike | September 6, 1965 (aged 32) | cm / kg | 1 | 0 | | | | | | |
| 5 | MF | (Brazil) | Santos | December 9, 1960 (aged 37) | cm / kg | 30 | 4 | | | | | | |
| 6 | MF | (Japan) | Katsumi Oenoki | April 3, 1965 (aged 32) | cm / kg | 30 | 1 | | | | | | |
| 7 | MF | (Japan) | Teruyoshi Ito | August 31, 1974 (aged 23) | cm / kg | 34 | 5 | | | | | | |
| 8 | FW | (Argentina) | Oliva | September 26, 1971 (aged 26) | cm / kg | 27 | 21 | | | | | | |
| 9 | FW | (Japan) | Kenta Hasegawa | September 25, 1965 (aged 32) | cm / kg | 31 | 9 | | | | | | |
| 10 | MF | (Japan) | Masaaki Sawanobori | January 12, 1970 (aged 28) | cm / kg | 32 | 10 | | | | | | |
| 11 | DF | (Japan) | Ryuzo Morioka | October 7, 1975 (aged 22) | cm / kg | 26 | 0 | | | | | | |
| 12 | FW | (Brazil) | Fabinho | June 16, 1974 (aged 23) | cm / kg | 19 | 5 | | | | | | |
| 13 | DF | (Japan) | Tadaaki Matsubara | July 2, 1977 (aged 20) | cm / kg | 3 | 0 | | | | | | |
| 14 | MF | (Japan) | Kazuyuki Toda | December 30, 1977 (aged 20) | cm / kg | 34 | 0 | | | | | | |
| 15 | DF | (Japan) | Ryo Oishi | July 13, 1977 (aged 20) | cm / kg | 0 | 0 | | | | | | |
| 16 | GK | (Japan) | Koji Nakahara | July 27, 1970 (aged 27) | cm / kg | 0 | 0 | | | | | | |
| 17 | MF | (Japan) | Alessandro Santos | July 20, 1977 (aged 20) | cm / kg | 26 | 10 | | | | | | |
| 18 | MF | (Japan) | Daizo Okitsu | June 15, 1974 (aged 23) | cm / kg | 0 | 0 | | | | | | |
| 19 | DF | (Japan) | Junji Nishizawa | May 10, 1974 (aged 23) | cm / kg | 26 | 1 | | | | | | |
| 20 | GK | (Japan) | Keisuke Hada | February 20, 1978 (aged 20) | cm / kg | 0 | 0 | | | | | | |
| 21 | MF | (Japan) | Nobuhiro Naito | May 25, 1978 (aged 19) | cm / kg | 0 | 0 | | | | | | |
| 22 | MF | (Japan) | Hisaaki Kobayashi | September 20, 1978 (aged 19) | cm / kg | 0 | 0 | | | | | | |
| 23 | FW | (Japan) | Hiromi Sekiya | May 6, 1975 (aged 22) | cm / kg | 0 | 0 | | | | | | |
| 23 | FW | (Japan) | Hiroyuki Ishida | August 31, 1979 (aged 18) | cm / kg | 2 | 0 | | | | | | |
| 24 | GK | (Japan) | Yosuke Nozawa | November 9, 1979 (aged 18) | cm / kg | 0 | 0 | | | | | | |
| 25 | DF | (Japan) | Daisuke Ichikawa | May 14, 1980 (aged 17) | cm / kg | 20 | 1 | | | | | | |
| 26 | MF | (Japan) | Kohei Hiramatsu | April 19, 1980 (aged 17) | cm / kg | 5 | 0 | | | | | | |
| 28 | DF | (Japan) | Yuzo Wada | May 2, 1980 (aged 17) | cm / kg | 13 | 0 | | | | | | |
| 29 | DF | (Japan) | Daiki Wakamatsu | August 2, 1976 (aged 21) | cm / kg | 0 | 0 | | | | | | |

== Other pages ==
- (in Japanese) J.League official site
