= Tsuyoshi Tanikawa =

Japanese footballer

Tsuyoshi Tanikawa 谷川 烈
Personal information
- Full name: Tsuyoshi Tanikawa
- Date of birth: April 25, 1980 (age 46)
- Place of birth: Shizuoka, Japan
- Height: 1.78 m (5 ft 10 in)
- Position: Midfielder

Youth career
- 1996–1998: Shimizu S-Pulse

Senior career*
Years	Team	Apps	(Gls)
1999–2002	Shimizu S-Pulse	2	(1)
2001	→Ventforet Kofu (loan)	20	(0)
2003	New Hampshire Phantoms		
2004	Mito HollyHock	8	(1)
2005–2007	FC Machida Zelvia	33	(7)
Total		63	(9)
Medal record
Shimizu S-Pulse
Runner-up	J1 League	1999
Winner	Emperor's Cup	2001
Runner-up	Emperor's Cup	2000
- * Club domestic league appearances and goals

Tsuyoshi Tanikawa (谷川 烈, Tanikawa Tsuyoshi; born April 25, 1980) is a former Japanese football player.

== Playing career ==
Tanikawa was born in Shizuoka on April 25, 1980. He joined J1 League club Shimizu S-Pulse from youth team in 1999. On March 27, he debuted as left side back against Kashiwa Reysol. However he could hardly play in the match until 2001. In August 2001, he moved to J2 League club Ventforet Kofu on loan. After the transfer, he played full time in all matches as center back. In 2002, he returned to Shimizu S-Pulse. However he could hardly play in the match. In 2003, he moved to United States and joined New Hampshire Phantoms. In 2004, he returned to Japan and joined J2 club Mito HollyHock. However he could not play many matches. In 2005, he moved to Prefectural Leagues club FC Machida Zelvia. He played many matches and the club was promoted to Regional Leagues from 2006. He retired end of 2007 season.

== Club statistics ==
Club performance			League		Cup		League Cup		Continental		Total	
Season	Club	League	Apps	Goals	Apps	Goals	Apps	Goals	Apps	Goals	Apps	Goals
Japan			League		Emperor's Cup		J.League Cup		Asia		Total	
1999	Shimizu S-Pulse	J1 League	1	0	0	0	0	0	-		1	0
2000	Shimizu S-Pulse	J1 League	1	1	0	0	0	0	-		1	1
2001	Shimizu S-Pulse	J1 League	0	0	0	0	0	0	-		0	0
2001	Ventforet Kofu	J2 League	20	0	3	0	0	0	-		23	0
2002	Shimizu S-Pulse	J1 League	0	0	1	0	1	0	1	0	3	0
2004	Mito HollyHock	J2 League	8	1	0	0	-		-		8	1
2005	FC Machida Zelvia	Prefectural Leagues	7	2	-		-		-		7	2
2006	FC Machida Zelvia	Regional Leagues	14	4	-		-		-		14	4
2007	FC Machida Zelvia	Regional Leagues	12	1	-		-		-		12	1
Total			63	9	4	0	1	0	1	0	69	9
