= Ademir Santos =

Brazilian footballer

Ademir Santos 三渡洲 アデミール
Personal information
- Full name: Ademir Santos
- Date of birth: March 28, 1968 (age 58)
- Place of birth: Bahia, Brazil
- Height: 1.74 m (5 ft 8 1/2 in)
- Position: Midfielder

Youth career
- 1982–1985: Juventus-SP
- 1985–1986: Tokai University Daiichi High School

Senior career*
Years	Team	Apps	(Gls)
1987–1991	Yamaha Motors	30	(2)
1992–1996	Shimizu S-Pulse	11	(2)
Total		41	(4)
Medal record
Yamaha Motors
Winner	Japan Soccer League	1987/88
Runner-up	JSL Cup	1989
Runner-up	Emperor's Cup	1989
Shimizu S-Pulse
Winner	J.League Cup	1996
Runner-up	J.League Cup	1992
Runner-up	J.League Cup	1993
- * Club domestic league appearances and goals

Ademir Santos (三渡洲 アデミール, Santosu Ademīru; born March 28, 1968) is a Brazilian former football player who moved to Japan at age 16 to complete his high school studies and obtained his Japanese citizenship in 1995. His son Maito Santos is also former footballer.

== Playing career ==
Santos was born in Bahia, Brazil on March 28, 1968. In May 1985, he moved to Japan and entered high school in Japan. After graduating from high school, he joined Japan Soccer League club Yamaha Motors in 1987. He played in 30 matches as offensive midfielder. In 1992, he moved to new J1 League club Shimizu S-Pulse. However he could hardly play in the games due to restrictions on foreign players. In September 1995, he obtained his Japanese citizenship. However he could hardly play in the games due to injuries. He retired at the end of the 1996 season.

== Club statistics ==
Club performance			League		Cup		League Cup		Total	
Season	Club	League	Apps	Goals	Apps	Goals	Apps	Goals	Apps	Goals
Japan			League		Emperor's Cup		J.League Cup		Total	
1987/88	Yamaha Motors	JSL Division 1	12	1					12	1
1988/89	Yamaha Motors	JSL Division 1	1	0			2	1	3	1
1989/90	Yamaha Motors	JSL Division 1	5	0			0	0	5	0
1990/91	Yamaha Motors	JSL Division 1	12	1			0	0	12	1
1992	Shimizu S-Pulse	J1 League	-		0	0	1	0	1	0
1993	Shimizu S-Pulse	J1 League	2	0	0	0	0	0	2	0
1994	Shimizu S-Pulse	J1 League	0	0	1	0	0	0	1	0
1995	Shimizu S-Pulse	J1 League	8	2	0	0	-		8	2
1996	Shimizu S-Pulse	J1 League	1	0	0	0	0	0	1	0
Total			41	4	1	0	3	1	45	5
