= Yuzo Wada =

Japanese footballer

Yuzo Wada 和田 雄三
Personal information
- Full name: Yuzo Wada
- Date of birth: May 2, 1980 (age 46)
- Place of birth: Shizuoka, Japan
- Height: 1.72 m (5 ft 7 1/2 in)
- Position: Midfielder

Youth career
- 1996–1998: Shimizu S-Pulse

Senior career*
Years	Team	Apps	(Gls)
1998–1999	Shimizu S-Pulse	13	(0)
2000–2002	Oita Trinita	21	(4)
2003	Ventforet Kofu	0	(0)
Total		34	(4)
Medal record
Shimizu S-Pulse
Runner-up	J1 League	1999
Runner-up	Emperor's Cup	1998
- * Club domestic league appearances and goals

Yuzo Wada (和田 雄三, Wada Yuzo; born May 2, 1980) is a former Japanese football player.

== Playing career ==
Wada was born in Shizuoka Prefecture on May 2, 1980. He joined J1 League club Shimizu S-Pulse from youth team in 1998. He played many matches as left side midfielder in 1998. However he could not play at all in the match in 1999. In 2000, he moved to J2 League club Oita Trinita. Although he played many matches in 2000, he could hardly play in the match from 2001. In 2003, he moved to J2 club Ventforet Kofu. However he could not play at all in the match and retired end of 2003 season.

== Club statistics ==
Club performance			League		Cup		League Cup		Total	
Season	Club	League	Apps	Goals	Apps	Goals	Apps	Goals	Apps	Goals
Japan			League		Emperor's Cup		J.League Cup		Total	
1998	Shimizu S-Pulse	J1 League	13	0	2	0	5	1	20	1
1999	Shimizu S-Pulse	J1 League	0	0	0	0	0	0	0	0
2000	Oita Trinita	J2 League	12	4	0	0	1	0	13	4
2001	Oita Trinita	J2 League	5	0	2	0	0	0	7	0
2002	Oita Trinita	J2 League	4	0	0	0	-		4	0
2003	Ventforet Kofu	J2 League	0	0	0	0	-		0	0
Total			34	4	4	0	6	1	44	5
