= Junji Nishizawa =

Japanese footballer

Junji Nishizawa 西澤 淳二
Personal information
- Full name: Junji Nishizawa
- Date of birth: May 10, 1974 (age 52)
- Place of birth: Tokyo, Japan
- Height: 1.81 m (5 ft 11 1/2 in)
- Position: Defender

Youth career
- 1990–1992: Verdy Kawasaki

Senior career*
Years	Team	Apps	(Gls)
1993–1996	Verdy Kawasaki	27	(1)
1997–1999	Shimizu S-Pulse	55	(2)
2000	Kawasaki Frontale	19	(1)
2001–2002	Nagoya Grampus Eight	19	(0)
2002	Kashima Antlers	7	(0)
2003–2008	Consadole Sapporo	142	(1)
Total		269	(5)
Medal record
Verdy Kawasaki
Winner	J1 League	1993
Winner	J1 League	1994
Runner-up	J1 League	1995
Winner	J.League Cup	1993
Winner	J.League Cup	1994
Runner-up	J.League Cup	1996
Winner	Emperor's Cup	1996
Shimizu S-Pulse
Runner-up	J1 League	1999
Runner-up	Emperor's Cup	1998
Kawasaki Frontale
Runner-up	J.League Cup	2000
Kashima Antlers
Winner	J.League Cup	2002
Runner-up	Emperor's Cup	2002
Consadole Sapporo
Winner	J2 League	2007
- * Club domestic league appearances and goals

Junji Nishizawa (西澤 淳二, Nishizawa Junji; born May 10, 1974) is a former Japanese football player.

== Playing career ==
Nishizawa was born in Tokyo on May 10, 1974. He joined Verdy Kawasaki from youth team in 1993. He debuted as center back in 1994 and his opportunity to play increased year by year. In 1997, he moved to Shimizu S-Pulse. He became a regular player as center back. However he lost his regular position in 1999. In 2000, he moved to the newly promoted J1 League club, Kawasaki Frontale. Although the club finished at bottom place in J1 League, the club won the 2nd place in J.League Cup. He played many matches as right defender of three backs defense. In 2001, he moved to Nagoya Grampus Eight. Although he played many matches in 2001, he could hardly play in the match in 2002. In September 2002, he moved to Kashima Antlers. In 2003, he moved to J2 League club Consadole Sapporo. He played many matches for long time. The club won the champions in 2007 and was promoted to J1 League. He retired at the end of the 2008 season.

== Career statistics ==
Appearances and goals by club, season and competition
Club	Season	League			Emperor's Cup		J.League Cup		Total	
Club	Season	Division	Apps	Goals	Apps	Goals	Apps	Goals	Apps	Goals
Verdy Kawasaki	1993	J1 League	0	0	0	0	0	0	0	0
Verdy Kawasaki	1994	J1 League	7	1	0	0	0	0	7	1
Verdy Kawasaki	1995	J1 League	8	0	1	0	—		9	0
Verdy Kawasaki	1996	J1 League	12	0	0	0	9	0	21	0
Shimizu S-Pulse	1997	J1 League	21	0	3	0	1	0	25	0
Shimizu S-Pulse	1998	J1 League	26	1	0	0	4	0	30	1
Shimizu S-Pulse	1999	J1 League	8	1	2	0	0	0	10	1
Kawasaki Frontale	2000	J1 League	19	1	1	0	7	0	27	1
Nagoya Grampus Eight	2001	J1 League	17	0	1	0	4	0	22	0
Nagoya Grampus Eight	2002	J1 League	2	0	0	0	0	0	2	0
Kashima Antlers	2002	J1 League	7	0	1	0	0	0	8	0
Consadole Sapporo	2003	J2 League	21	1	0	0	—		21	1
Consadole Sapporo	2004	J2 League	36	0	4	0	—		40	0
Consadole Sapporo	2005	J2 League	19	0	0	0	—		19	0
Consadole Sapporo	2006	J2 League	10	0	7	0	—		17	0
Consadole Sapporo	2007	J2 League	38	0	0	0	—		38	0
Consadole Sapporo	2008	J1 League	18	0	0	0	1	0	19	0
Career total			269	5	26	0	21	0	316	5
