= Fernando Oliva =

Argentine footballer

Personal information
- Full name: Fernando Nicolas Oliva
- Date of birth: September 26, 1971 (age 55)
- Place of birth: Córdoba, Argentina
- Height: 1.80 m (5 ft 11 in)
- Position: Forward

Senior career*
Years	Team	Apps	(Gls)
1996–1998	Shimizu S-Pulse	67	(39)
2000–2001	Shimizu S-Pulse	5	(1)
- * Club domestic league appearances and goals

Fernando Nicolas Oliva (born September 26, 1971) is a former Argentine football player.

== Club statistics ==
Club performance			League		Cup		League Cup		Total	
Season	Club	League	Apps	Goals	Apps	Goals	Apps	Goals	Apps	Goals
Japan			League		Emperor's Cup		J.League Cup		Total	
1996	Shimizu S-Pulse	J1 League	18	5	2	1	16	9	36	15
1997	Shimizu S-Pulse	J1 League	22	13	3	2	5	2	30	17
1998	Shimizu S-Pulse	J1 League	27	21	0	0	0	0	27	21
2000	Shimizu S-Pulse	J1 League	5	1	4	1	2	1	11	3
2001	Shimizu S-Pulse	J1 League	0	0	0	0	0	0	0	0
Total			72	40	9	4	23	12	104	56

== Honors ==
Shimizu S-Pulse

- J.League Cup: 1996
- Asian Cup Winners Cup: 2000
- Emperor's Cup: 2001
- Japanese Super Cup: 2001
