= Carlos Alberto Santos =

Brazilian footballer and manager (born 1960)

Personal information
- Full name: Carlos Alberto Souza dos Santos
- Date of birth: December 9, 1960 (age 65)
- Place of birth: Vianópolis, Brazil
- Height: 1.76 m (5 ft 9 1/2 in)
- Position: Midfielder

Team information
- Current team: 7 de Abril (coach)

Senior career*
Years	Team	Apps	(Gls)
1981–1986	Goiás		
1987	Novorizontino		
1987–1992	Botafogo		
1992–1995	Kashima Antlers		
1995–2000	Shimizu S-Pulse		
2001	Vissel Kobe		
2003	Thespa Kusatsu		

Managerial career
- 2006–2007: Botafogo (U-20)
- 2015: Angra dos Reis
- 2017–: 7 de Abril
- * Club domestic league appearances and goals

Carlos Alberto Souza dos Santos, best known as Santos (born December 9, 1960) is a retired Brazilian football retired player and manager.

Carlos Alberto Santos made nearly 200 Campeonato Brasileiro appearances for Goiás and Botafogo.

In 1992, he joined Kashima Antlers in Japan. In 1993, He played a key role in winning the first stage of the J1 League championship and he was named 1993 J.League Team of the Year.

After leaving Antlers in 1995, he played 5 and a half years with Shimizu S-Pulse. In 1996, he helped to win J.League Cup and was named the J. League Cup MVP.

== Club statistics ==
Club performance			League		Cup		League Cup		Total	
Season	Club	League	Apps	Goals	Apps	Goals	Apps	Goals	Apps	Goals
Japan			League		Emperor's Cup		J.League Cup		Total	
1992	Kashima Antlers	J1 League	-		3	2	10	3	13	5
1993	Kashima Antlers	J1 League	32	8	5	0	6	0	43	8
1994	Kashima Antlers	J1 League	22	4	1	0	1	1	24	5
1995	Kashima Antlers	J1 League	25	5	0	0	-		25	5
1995	Shimizu S-Pulse	J1 League	18	3	1	0	-		19	3
1996	Shimizu S-Pulse	J1 League	27	1	3	0	15	1	45	2
1997	Shimizu S-Pulse	J1 League	31	3	3	3	6	0	40	6
1998	Shimizu S-Pulse	J1 League	30	4	4	2	5	1	39	7
1999	Shimizu S-Pulse	J1 League	27	1	3	0	4	0	34	1
2000	Shimizu S-Pulse	J1 League	27	4	5	1	5	4	37	9
2001	Vissel Kobe	J1 League	26	0	0	0	3	0	29	0
2003	Thespa Kusatsu	Regional Leagues	6	0	1	0	-		7	0
Total			271	33	29	8	55	10	355	51

== Honors ==
- J.League Best Eleven - 1993
- J. League Cup MVP - 1996
- J. League Meritoriousness Player Award - 2002
