= Masahiro Ando (footballer) =

Japanese footballer

Masahiro Ando 安藤 正裕
Personal information
- Full name: Masahiro Ando
- Date of birth: April 2, 1972 (age 54)
- Place of birth: Sakado, Saitama, Japan
- Height: 1.76 m (5 ft 9 1/2 in)
- Position: Midfielder

Youth career
- 1988–1990: Ogose High School
- 1991–1994: Kokushikan University

Senior career*
Years	Team	Apps	(Gls)
1995–1999	Shimizu S-Pulse	115	(16)
1999–2000	Júbilo Iwata	4	(0)
2000	Yokohama F. Marinos	7	(0)
2001	Omiya Ardija	44	(5)
2002	Gamba Osaka	2	(0)
2002	Vegalta Sendai	12	(0)
2003–2005	Omiya Ardija	84	(4)
2003	→Kyoto Purple Sanga (loan)	3	(0)
Total		271	(25)

International career
1999	Japan	1	(0)
Medal record
Shimizu S-Pulse
Runner-up	J1 League	1999
Winner	J.League Cup	1996
Runner-up	Emperor's Cup	1998
Júbilo Iwata
Winner	J1 League	1999
Yokohama F. Marinos
Runner-up	J1 League	2000
- * Club domestic league appearances and goals

Masahiro Ando (安藤 正裕, Andō Masahiro; born April 2, 1972) is a former Japanese football player. He played for Japan national team.

== Club career ==
Ando was born in Sakado on April 2, 1972. After graduating from Kokushikan University, he joined J1 League club Shimizu S-Pulse in 1995. He became a regular player as right midfielder from 1996. The club won the champions at 1996 J.League Cup. However his opportunity to play decreased behind Daisuke Ichikawa in 1999. In October 1999, he moved to across town to the Shimizu S-Pulse rivals, Júbilo Iwata. At Júbilo Iwata in 1999 season, Júbilo Iwata won the champions beat Shimizu S-Pulse championship playoff. In June 2000, he moved to Yokohama F. Marinos. In 2001, he moved to J2 League club Omiya Ardija and he played as regular player. In 2002, he moved to Gamba Osaka. However he could hardly play in the match. In September 2002, he moved to newly was promoted to J1 League club, Vegalta Sendai and he played many matches as right side back. In 2003, he moved to Omiya Ardija again. Although he played as regular player, he moved to Kyoto Purple Sanga competing for stay J1 in October. However he could hardly play in the match and the club was relegated to J2. In 2004, he returned to Omiya Ardija. He played as regular player and the club was promoted to J1 from 2005. However his opportunity to play decreased in 2005 and retired end of 2005 season.

== National team career ==
In June 1999, Ando was selected for the Japan national team for the 1999 Copa América. At this competition, on July 2, he played against Paraguay.

== Club statistics ==
Club performance			League		Cup		League Cup		Total	
Season	Club	League	Apps	Goals	Apps	Goals	Apps	Goals	Apps	Goals
Japan			League		Emperor's Cup		J.League Cup		Total	
1995	Shimizu S-Pulse	J1 League	7	0	0	0	-		7	0
1996	Shimizu S-Pulse	J1 League	30	0	3	0	16	0	49	0
1997	Shimizu S-Pulse	J1 League	32	2	3	0	6	0	41	2
1998	Shimizu S-Pulse	J1 League	30	2	5	0	5	1	40	3
1999	Shimizu S-Pulse	J1 League	16	2	0	0	3	1	19	3
1999	Júbilo Iwata	J1 League	4	0	3	0	0	0	7	0
2000	Júbilo Iwata	J1 League	0	0	0	0	0	0	0	0
2000	Yokohama F. Marinos	J1 League	7	0	0	0	1	0	8	0
2001	Omiya Ardija	J2 League	44	5	1	0	2	0	47	5
2002	Gamba Osaka	J1 League	2	0	0	0	1	0	3	0
2002	Vegalta Sendai	J1 League	12	0	2	0	0	0	14	0
2003	Omiya Ardija	J2 League	36	3	0	0	-		36	3
2003	Kyoto Purple Sanga	J1 League	3	0	1	0	0	0	4	0
2004	Omiya Ardija	J2 League	44	1	2	0	-		46	1
2005	Omiya Ardija	J1 League	4	0	0	0	0	0	4	0
Total			271	15	20	0	34	2	326	17

== National team statistics ==
Japan national team
Year	Apps	Goals
1999	1	0
Total	1	0
