= 1999 J.League Division 2 =

J.League Division 2
- Season: 1999
- Champions: Kawasaki Frontale; 1st J2 title 2nd D2 title
- Promoted: Kawasaki Frontale; FC Tokyo
- Matches: 180
- Goals: 490 (2.72 per match)
- Top goalscorer: Takuya Jinno (19 goals)
- Highest attendance: 17,427; Consadole Sapporo 4–1 FC Tokyo (29 August 1999)
- Lowest attendance: 619; Ventforet Kofu 3–5 FC Tokyo (10 September 1999)
- Total attendance: 827,217
- Average attendance: 4,595

Statistics of J.League Division 2 in the 1999 season.

== Overview ==
This was the first season of J.League Division 2, the second tier of professional leagues in Japan. It replaced the JFL, which was moved to the third tier. The league was contested by 10 teams, and Kawasaki Frontale won the championship and was promoted to J1 league along with FC Tokyo for the 2000 season.

=== Team changes ===
| Promoted from JFL 1998 | Relegated from 1998 J.League |
|---|---|
| Albirex Niigata; FC Tokyo; Kawasaki Frontale; Montedio Yamagata; Oita Trinita; Omiya Ardija; Sagan Tosu; Vegalta Sendai; Ventforet Kofu | Consadole Sapporo |

== Clubs ==
The following 10 clubs participated in J.League Division 2 during the 1999 season.

| Club name | Hometown | Stadium | Capacity |
|---|---|---|---|
| Albirex Niigata | Niigata | Niigata Athletic Stadium | 18,671 |
| Consadole Sapporo | Sapporo | Atsubetsu Stadium / Muroran Irie Stadium | 20,861 |
| FC Tokyo | Tokyo | Nishigaoka Soccer Stadium / Edogawa Stadium | 7,137 |
| Kawasaki Frontale | Kawasaki | Kawasaki Todoroki Stadium / Nagano Athletic Stadium / International Stadium | 26,232 |
| Montedio Yamagata | Yamagata | Yamagata Park Stadium / Yamagata Municipal Stadium / Tsuruoka Stadium | 20,315 |
| Oita Trinita | Oita | Oita Athletic Stadium / Saiki Stadium | 16,000 |
| Omiya Ardija | Tokyo | Omiya Football Stadium / Konosu Stadium / Tochigi Green Stadium | 15,500 |
| Sagan Tosu | Tosu | Tosu Stadium | 24,130 |
| Vegalta Sendai | Sendai | Sendai Stadium | 19,694 |
| Ventforet Kofu | Kōfu | Kose Sports Park Stadium / Konosu Stadium / Nirasaki Stadium | 17,000 |

=== Personnel ===
| Club | Head coach |
|---|---|
| Albirex Niigata | (Japan) Yoshikazu Nagai |
| Consadole Sapporo | (Japan) Takeshi Okada |
| FC Tokyo | (Japan) Kiyoshi Okuma |
| Kawasaki Frontale | (Japan) Ikuo Matsumoto |
| Montedio Yamagata | (Japan) Shigeharu Ueki |
| Oita Trinita | (Japan) Nobuhiro Ishizaki |
| Omiya Ardija | (Netherlands) Pim Verbeek |
| Sagan Tosu | (Japan) Hiroshi Sowa |
| Vegalta Sendai | (Japan) Hidehiko Shimizu |
| Ventforet Kofu | (Japan) Susumu Katsumata |

=== Foreign players ===
| Club | Player 1 | Player 2 | Player 3 | Non-visa foreign | Former players |
|---|---|---|---|---|---|
| Albirex Niigata | (Brazil) Saulo | (Brazil) Serjão | | (Brazil) Rikarudo Higa | |
| Consadole Sapporo | (Brazil) Assis | (Brazil) Biju | | | (Brazil) Dinei (Brazil) Kleber Romero (Brazil) Ricardinho |
| FC Tokyo | (Brazil) Almir | (Brazil) Amaral | | (Brazil) Sandro | |
| Kawasaki Frontale | (Brazil) Cadu | (Brazil) Tinga | (Brazil) Tuto | | (Brazil) Genilson |
| Montedio Yamagata | (Brazil) Alan Dotti | (Brazil) Walter | (Nigeria) Momodu Mutairu | | |
| Oita Trinita | (Brazil) Will | (Cameroon) Edwin Ifeanyi | (South Korea) Choi Dae-shik | | (Brazil) Alex |
| Omiya Ardija | (England) Mark Burke | (Netherlands) Jan Veenhof | | | (Cameroon) Edwin Ifeanyi (Netherlands) Jeroen Boere |
| Sagan Tosu | | | | (South Korea) Pak Yong-ho | |
| Vegalta Sendai | (Brazil) Paulo Henrique | (Colombia) Nixon Perea | (Federal Republic of Yugoslavia) Slobodan Dubajić | | |
| Ventforet Kofu | | | | | |

== Final table ==
| Pos | Team | Pld | W | OTW | D | OTL | L | GF | GA | GD | Pts | Promotion |
|---|---|---|---|---|---|---|---|---|---|---|---|---|
| 1 | Kawasaki Frontale (C) | 36 | 20 | 5 | 3 | 1 | 7 | 69 | 34 | +35 | 73 | Promoted to the 2000 J.League Division 1 |
| 2 | FC Tokyo (P) | 36 | 19 | 2 | 3 | 2 | 10 | 51 | 35 | +16 | 64 | Promoted to the 2000 J.League Division 1 |
| 3 | Oita Trinita | 36 | 18 | 3 | 3 | 4 | 8 | 62 | 42 | +20 | 63 | |
| 4 | Albirex Niigata | 36 | 16 | 4 | 2 | 1 | 13 | 46 | 40 | +6 | 58 | |
| 5 | Consadole Sapporo | 36 | 15 | 2 | 6 | 2 | 11 | 54 | 35 | +19 | 55 | |
| 6 | Omiya Ardija | 36 | 14 | 4 | 1 | 2 | 15 | 47 | 44 | +3 | 51 | |
| 7 | Montedio Yamagata | 36 | 14 | 1 | 4 | 4 | 13 | 47 | 53 | −6 | 48 | |
| 8 | Sagan Tosu | 36 | 11 | 1 | 2 | 2 | 20 | 52 | 64 | −12 | 37 | |
| 9 | Vegalta Sendai | 36 | 7 | 3 | 4 | 4 | 18 | 30 | 58 | −28 | 31 | |
| 10 | Ventforet Kofu | 36 | 4 | 1 | 4 | 4 | 23 | 32 | 85 | −53 | 18 | |

Source: Official J.League statistics webpage
(C) Champion; (P) Promoted

== Attendances ==
| # | Football club | Total attendance | Home games | Average | Highest | Lowest |
|---|---|---|---|---|---|---|
| 1 | Consadole Sapporo | 197,752 | 18 | 10,986 | 17,427 | 4,388 |
| 2 | Vegalta Sendai | 134,462 | 18 | 7,470 | 16,535 | 2,568 |
| 3 | Kawasaki Frontale | 97,128 | 18 | 5,396 | 13,812 | 2,425 |
| 4 | Albirex Niigata | 75,798 | 18 | 4,211 | 9,327 | 2,118 |
| 5 | Oita Trinita | 69,952 | 18 | 3,886 | 15,702 | 1,431 |
| 6 | FC Tokyo | 62,963 | 18 | 3,498 | 7,325 | 1,501 |
| 7 | Sagan Tosu | 60,936 | 18 | 3,385 | 5,797 | 1,838 |
| 8 | Montedio Yamagata | 53,643 | 18 | 2,980 | 5,836 | 1,812 |
| 9 | Omiya Ardija | 41,833 | 18 | 2,674 | 5,609 | 1,296 |
| 10 | Ventforet Kofu | 26,450 | 18 | 1469 | 3,807 | 619 |
