= 1999 Montedio Yamagata season =

Montedio Yamagata
1999 season
- Manager: Shigeharu Ueki
- Stadium: Yamagata Park Stadium
- J.League 2: 7th
- Emperor's Cup: Quarterfinals
- J.League Cup: 1st Round
- Top goalscorer: Satoshi Mashimo (18)
Home colours	Away colours

1999 Montedio Yamagata season

== Competitions ==
Competitions	Position
J.League 2	7th / 10 clubs
Emperor's Cup	Quarterfinals
J.League Cup	1st round

== Domestic results ==
=== J.League 2 ===
14 March 1999 1	Vegalta Sendai	2-3	Montedio Yamagata	Sendai Stadium
JST (UTC+09)

20 March 1999 2	Albirex Niigata	1-0	Montedio Yamagata	Niigata City Athletic Stadium
JST (UTC+09)

28 March 1999 3	Montedio Yamagata	2-1	Kawasaki Frontale	Tsuruoka Komakihara Stadium
JST (UTC+09)

4 April 1999 4	Oita Trinita	2-1	Montedio Yamagata	Oita Athletic Stadium
JST (UTC+09)

11 April 1999 5	FC Tokyo	0-1	Montedio Yamagata	Nishigaoka Soccer Stadium
JST (UTC+09)

18 April 1999 6	Montedio Yamagata	4-1	Ventforet Kofu	Yamagata Park Stadium
JST (UTC+09)

25 April 1999 7	Consadole Sapporo	3-2	Montedio Yamagata	Muroran Irie Stadium
JST (UTC+09)

29 April 1999 8	Montedio Yamagata	1-2	Omiya Ardija	Yamagata Park Stadium
JST (UTC+09)

2 May 1999 9	Sagan Tosu	0-1	Montedio Yamagata	Tosu Stadium
JST (UTC+09)

5 May 1999 10	Montedio Yamagata	3-0	Albirex Niigata	Yamagata Park Stadium
JST (UTC+09)

9 May 1999 11	Kawasaki Frontale	4-0	Montedio Yamagata	Todoroki Athletics Stadium
JST (UTC+09)

16 May 1999 12	Montedio Yamagata	2-1	Oita Trinita	Yamagata Park Stadium
JST (UTC+09)

23 May 1999 13	Montedio Yamagata	1-2	FC Tokyo	Yamagata Park Stadium
JST (UTC+09)

29 May 1999 14	Ventforet Kofu	2-1	Montedio Yamagata	Kose Sports Park Stadium
JST (UTC+09)

27 June 1999 15	Montedio Yamagata	1-1 (GG) (a.e.t.)	Consadole Sapporo	Yamagata Park Stadium
JST (UTC+09)

4 July 1999 16	Omiya Ardija	1-0 (GG) (a.e.t.)	Montedio Yamagata	Omiya Football Stadium
JST (UTC+09)

11 July 1999 17	Montedio Yamagata	3-2	Sagan Tosu	Tsuruoka Komakihara Stadium
JST (UTC+09)

17 July 1999 18	Montedio Yamagata	2-1	Vegalta Sendai	Yamagata Park Stadium
JST (UTC+09)

1 August 1999 19	Montedio Yamagata	1-0	Oita Trinita	Yamagata Park Stadium
JST (UTC+09)

8 August 1999 20	Sagan Tosu	3-0	Montedio Yamagata	Tosu Stadium
JST (UTC+09)

15 August 1999 21	FC Tokyo	1-0 (GG) (a.e.t.)	Montedio Yamagata	Edogawa Stadium
JST (UTC+09)

23 August 1999 22	Montedio Yamagata	1-4	Consadole Sapporo	Yamagata Park Stadium
JST (UTC+09)

29 August 1999 23	Kawasaki Frontale	1-0	Montedio Yamagata	Todoroki Athletics Stadium
JST (UTC+09)

5 September 1999 24	Montedio Yamagata	3-0	Ventforet Kofu	Yamagata Park Stadium
JST (UTC+09)

12 September 1999 25	Omiya Ardija	1-2	Montedio Yamagata	Omiya Football Stadium
JST (UTC+09)

15 September 1999 26	Montedio Yamagata	0-0 (GG) (a.e.t.)	Vegalta Sendai	Yamagata Park Stadium
JST (UTC+09)

18 September 1999 27	Albirex Niigata	1-3	Montedio Yamagata	Niigata City Athletic Stadium
JST (UTC+09)

26 September 1999 28	Montedio Yamagata	2-1	Sagan Tosu	Yamagata Park Stadium
JST (UTC+09)

3 October 1999 29	Montedio Yamagata	2-1	FC Tokyo	Yamagata City Athletic Stadium
JST (UTC+09)

11 October 1999 30	Consadole Sapporo	2-0	Montedio Yamagata	Sapporo Atsubetsu Park Stadium
JST (UTC+09)

17 October 1999 31	Montedio Yamagata	0-2	Kawasaki Frontale	Yamagata City Athletic Stadium
JST (UTC+09)

25 October 1999 32	Ventforet Kofu	3-0	Montedio Yamagata	Kose Sports Park Stadium
JST (UTC+09)

31 October 1999 33	Montedio Yamagata	1-2	Omiya Ardija	Yamagata Park Stadium
JST (UTC+09)

6 November 1999 34	Vegalta Sendai	1-1 (GG) (a.e.t.)	Montedio Yamagata	Sendai Stadium
JST (UTC+09)

14 November 1999 35	Montedio Yamagata	2-3 (GG) (a.e.t.)	Albirex Niigata	Yamagata Park Stadium
JST (UTC+09)

21 November 1999 36	Oita Trinita	1-1 (GG) (a.e.t.)	Montedio Yamagata	Oita Athletic Stadium
JST (UTC+09)

=== Emperor's Cup ===
28 November 1999 1st Round	Blaze Kumamoto	0-8	Montedio Yamagata	Suizenji Stadium
JST (UTC+09)

5 December 1999 2nd Round	Montedio Yamagata	3-0	Teihens	Iwaki Green Field
JST (UTC+09)

12 December 1999 3rd Round	Vissel Kobe	0-0 (GG) (a.e.t.) (3-4 p)	Montedio Yamagata	Kobe Universiade Memorial Stadium
JST (UTC+09)

19 December 1999 4th Round	Cerezo Osaka	3-4 (GG) (a.e.t.)	Montedio Yamagata	Ehime Matsuyama Athletic Stadium
JST (UTC+09)

23 December 1999 Quarterfinals	Montedio Yamagata	0-2	Kashiwa Reysol	Kobe Universiade Memorial Stadium
JST (UTC+09)

=== J.League Cup ===
7 April 1999 1st Round-1	Montedio Yamagata	0-5	Kyoto Purple Sanga	Yamagata Park Stadium
JST (UTC+09)

14 April 1999 1st Round-2	Kyoto Purple Sanga	4-1 (9-1 agg.)	Montedio Yamagata	Nishikyogoku Athletic Stadium
JST (UTC+09)

== Player statistics ==
No.	Pos.	Nat.	Player	D.o.B. (Age)	Height / Weight	J.League 2		Emperor's Cup		J.League Cup		Total	
No.	Pos.	Nat.	Player	D.o.B. (Age)	Height / Weight	Apps	Goals	Apps	Goals	Apps	Goals	Apps	Goals
1	GK	(Japan)	Katsumi Suzuki	April 21, 1969 (aged 29)	cm / kg	33	0						
2	DF	(Japan)	Toshihiko Uchiyama	October 21, 1978 (aged 20)	cm / kg	15	0						
3	DF	(Japan)	Masayuki Ota	June 17, 1973 (aged 25)	cm / kg	32	1						
4	DF	(Japan)	Hironari Iwamoto	June 27, 1970 (aged 28)	cm / kg	32	2						
5	DF	(Japan)	Naoki Hommachi	July 31, 1968 (aged 30)	cm / kg	32	0						
6	MF	(Japan)	Kenji Takahashi	June 5, 1970 (aged 28)	cm / kg	33	3						
7	MF	(Japan)	Tatsuma Yoshida	June 9, 1974 (aged 24)	cm / kg	34	5						
8	FW	(Nigeria)	Mutairu Momodu	June 2, 1975 (aged 23)	cm / kg	22	6						
9	FW	(Japan)	Satoshi Mashimo	March 6, 1974 (aged 25)	cm / kg	36	18						
10	MF	(Brazil)	Walter	October 21, 1968 (aged 30)	cm / kg	30	3						
11	MF	(Japan)	Daisuke Nakamori	July 10, 1974 (aged 24)	cm / kg	15	0						
13	MF	(Japan)	Takashi Shoji	September 14, 1971 (aged 27)	cm / kg	21	2						
14	MF	(Japan)	Hiroki Iizuka	April 4, 1978 (aged 20)	cm / kg	5	0						
15	MF	(Japan)	Tomokazu Hirama	June 30, 1977 (aged 21)	cm / kg	35	5						
16	GK	(Japan)	Tetsu Takahashi	August 22, 1979 (aged 19)	cm / kg	0	0						
17	FW	(Japan)	Taro Urabe	July 11, 1977 (aged 21)	cm / kg	15	1						
18	DF	(Japan)	Junji Sato	February 4, 1975 (aged 24)	cm / kg	28	0						
19	FW	(Japan)	Kosuke Harada	December 21, 1977 (aged 21)	cm / kg	8	1						
20	FW	(Japan)	Ryosuke Nemoto	August 24, 1980 (aged 18)	cm / kg	11	0						
21	GK	(Japan)	Takeshi Saito	June 1, 1979 (aged 19)	cm / kg	3	0						
22	DF	(Japan)	Masakazu Washida	November 15, 1978 (aged 20)	cm / kg	18	0						
23	DF	(Brazil)	Alan	March 19, 1977 (aged 21)	cm / kg	7	0						
24	MF	(Japan)	Jun Kokubo	September 8, 1980 (aged 18)	cm / kg	7	0						

== Other pages ==
- (in Japanese) J. League official site
