= 2001 Montedio Yamagata season =

Montedio Yamagata
2001 season
- Manager: Koichi Hashiratani
- Stadium: Yamagata Park Stadium
- J.League 2: 3rd
- Emperor's Cup: 3rd Round
- J.League Cup: 1st Round
- Top goalscorer: Ryosuke Nemoto (13)
Home colours	Away colours

2001 Montedio Yamagata season

Montedio Yamagata finished third in the J.League 2 table.

== Competitions ==
Competitions	Position
J.League 2	3rd / 12 clubs
Emperor's Cup	3rd round
J.League Cup	1st round

== Domestic results ==
=== J.League 2 ===
10 March 2001 1	Kyoto Purple Sanga	2-2 (GG) (a.e.t.)	Montedio Yamagata	Nishikyogoku Athletic Stadium
JST (UTC+09)

20 March 2001 2	Omiya Ardija	1-2	Montedio Yamagata	Omiya Football Stadium
JST (UTC+09)

24 March 2001 3	Albirex Niigata	1-1 (GG) (a.e.t.)	Montedio Yamagata	Niigata City Athletic Stadium
JST (UTC+09)

31 March 2001 4	Montedio Yamagata	3-0	Mito HollyHock	Yamagata Park Stadium
JST (UTC+09)

8 April 2001 5	Kawasaki Frontale	1-0	Montedio Yamagata	Todoroki Athletics Stadium
JST (UTC+09)

14 April 2001 6	Montedio Yamagata	2-1	Yokohama FC	Tsuruoka Komakihara Stadium
JST (UTC+09)

21 April 2001 7	Shonan Bellmare	3-2 (GG) (a.e.t.)	Montedio Yamagata	Hiratsuka Athletics Stadium
JST (UTC+09)

28 April 2001 8	Montedio Yamagata	1-0	Ventforet Kofu	Yamagata Park Stadium
JST (UTC+09)

3 May 2001 9	Vegalta Sendai	2-2 (GG) (a.e.t.)	Montedio Yamagata	Sendai Stadium
JST (UTC+09)

6 May 2001 10	Montedio Yamagata	0-0 (GG) (a.e.t.)	Sagan Tosu	Yamagata Park Stadium
JST (UTC+09)

12 May 2001 11	Oita Trinita	0-1 (GG) (a.e.t.)	Montedio Yamagata	Oita Athletic Stadium
JST (UTC+09)

19 May 2001 12	Montedio Yamagata	1-2 (GG) (a.e.t.)	Omiya Ardija	Yamagata Park Stadium
JST (UTC+09)

23 May 2001 13	Montedio Yamagata	0-1	Albirex Niigata	Yamagata Park Stadium
JST (UTC+09)

26 May 2001 14	Yokohama FC	1-0 (GG) (a.e.t.)	Montedio Yamagata	Yokohama Mitsuzawa Stadium
JST (UTC+09)

17 June 2001 15	Montedio Yamagata	1-2	Shonan Bellmare	Yamagata Park Stadium
JST (UTC+09)

23 June 2001 16	Sagan Tosu	0-1	Montedio Yamagata	Tosu Stadium
JST (UTC+09)

29 June 2001 17	Montedio Yamagata	0-0 (GG) (a.e.t.)	Oita Trinita	Yamagata Park Stadium
JST (UTC+09)

7 July 2001 18	Ventforet Kofu	0-1	Montedio Yamagata	Kose Sports Park Stadium
JST (UTC+09)

11 July 2001 19	Montedio Yamagata	0-2	Vegalta Sendai	Yamagata Park Stadium
JST (UTC+09)

14 July 2001 20	Montedio Yamagata	2-1	Kyoto Purple Sanga	Yamagata Park Stadium
JST (UTC+09)

21 July 2001 21	Mito HollyHock	1-2 (GG) (a.e.t.)	Montedio Yamagata	Hitachinaka City Stadium
JST (UTC+09)

25 July 2001 22	Montedio Yamagata	2-1 (GG) (a.e.t.)	Kawasaki Frontale	Yamagata Park Stadium
JST (UTC+09)

28 July 2001 23	Oita Trinita	1-2	Montedio Yamagata	Ōita Stadium
JST (UTC+09)

3 August 2001 24	Albirex Niigata	0-1 (GG) (a.e.t.)	Montedio Yamagata	Niigata Stadium
JST (UTC+09)

11 August 2001 25	Montedio Yamagata	2-1	Ventforet Kofu	Yamagata Park Stadium
JST (UTC+09)

14 August 2001 26	Vegalta Sendai	2-1	Montedio Yamagata	Sendai Stadium
JST (UTC+09)

18 August 2001 27	Montedio Yamagata	1-0	Yokohama FC	Yamagata City Athletic Stadium
JST (UTC+09)

25 August 2001 28	Shonan Bellmare	1-3	Montedio Yamagata	Hiratsuka Athletics Stadium
JST (UTC+09)

1 September 2001 29	Montedio Yamagata	2-0	Mito HollyHock	Yamagata City Athletic Stadium
JST (UTC+09)

5 September 2001 30	Kawasaki Frontale	0-2	Montedio Yamagata	Todoroki Athletics Stadium
JST (UTC+09)

8 September 2001 31	Montedio Yamagata	2-0	Sagan Tosu	Yamagata Park Stadium
JST (UTC+09)

15 September 2001 32	Omiya Ardija	3-0	Montedio Yamagata	Omiya Football Stadium
JST (UTC+09)

19 September 2001 33	Montedio Yamagata	4-3	Kyoto Purple Sanga	Yamagata Park Stadium
JST (UTC+09)

22 September 2001 34	Ventforet Kofu	0-2	Montedio Yamagata	Kose Sports Park Stadium
JST (UTC+09)

30 September 2001 35	Montedio Yamagata	2-1	Shonan Bellmare	Yamagata Park Stadium
JST (UTC+09)

6 October 2001 36	Yokohama FC	0-2	Montedio Yamagata	Yokohama Mitsuzawa Stadium
JST (UTC+09)

13 October 2001 37	Montedio Yamagata	0-2	Vegalta Sendai	Yamagata Park Stadium
JST (UTC+09)

17 October 2001 38	Sagan Tosu	0-3	Montedio Yamagata	Saga Stadium
JST (UTC+09)

20 October 2001 39	Montedio Yamagata	1-0 (GG) (a.e.t.)	Oita Trinita	Yamagata Park Stadium
JST (UTC+09)

28 October 2001 40	Kyoto Purple Sanga	0-0 (GG) (a.e.t.)	Montedio Yamagata	Nishikyogoku Athletic Stadium
JST (UTC+09)

3 November 2001 41	Montedio Yamagata	2-1	Omiya Ardija	Tsuruoka Komakihara Stadium
JST (UTC+09)

6 November 2001 42	Montedio Yamagata	2-1 (GG) (a.e.t.)	Albirex Niigata	Yamagata Park Stadium
JST (UTC+09)

10 November 2001 43	Mito HollyHock	0-1 (GG) (a.e.t.)	Montedio Yamagata	Kasamatsu Stadium
JST (UTC+09)

18 November 2001 44	Montedio Yamagata	0-1 (GG) (a.e.t.)	Kawasaki Frontale	Yamagata Park Stadium
JST (UTC+09)

=== Emperor's Cup ===
25 November 2001 1st Round	Volca Kagoshima	2-3 (GG) (a.e.t.)	Montedio Yamagata	Kagoshima Kamoike Stadium
JST (UTC+09)

2 December 2001 2nd Round	Montedio Yamagata	1-0	Ehime FC	Iwaki Green Field
JST (UTC+09)

9 December 2001 3rd Round	Vissel Kobe	1-0	Montedio Yamagata	Kobe Universiade Memorial Stadium
JST (UTC+09)

=== J.League Cup ===
4 April 2001 1st Round-1	Montedio Yamagata	2-0	Urawa Red Diamonds	Yamagata Park Stadium
JST (UTC+09)

18 April 2001 1st Round-2	Urawa Red Diamonds	3-0 (3-2 agg.)	Montedio Yamagata	Urawa Komaba Stadium
JST (UTC+09)

== Player statistics ==
No.	Pos.	Nat.	Player	D.o.B. (Age)	Height / Weight	J.League 2		Emperor's Cup		J.League Cup		Total	
No.	Pos.	Nat.	Player	D.o.B. (Age)	Height / Weight	Apps	Goals	Apps	Goals	Apps	Goals	Apps	Goals
1	GK	(Japan)	Katsumi Suzuki	April 21, 1969 (aged 31)	cm / kg	43	0						
2	DF	(Japan)	Toshihiko Uchiyama	October 21, 1978 (aged 22)	cm / kg	14	0						
3	DF	(Japan)	Masayuki Ota	June 17, 1973 (aged 27)	cm / kg	40	1						
4	DF	(Japan)	Yoshifumi Ono	May 22, 1978 (aged 22)	cm / kg	21	1						
5	DF	(Japan)	Taku Watanabe	November 9, 1971 (aged 29)	cm / kg	28	2						
6	MF	(Japan)	Kenji Takahashi	June 5, 1970 (aged 30)	cm / kg	43	0						
7	MF	(Japan)	Tatsuma Yoshida	June 9, 1974 (aged 26)	cm / kg	24	0						
8	MF	(Japan)	Atsushi Nagai	December 23, 1974 (aged 26)	cm / kg	37	0						
9	FW	(Japan)	Hideo Ōshima	March 7, 1980 (aged 21)	cm / kg	43	12						
10	MF	(Japan)	Teppei Nishiyama	February 22, 1975 (aged 26)	cm / kg	41	5						
11	FW	(Japan)	Taichi Sato	August 23, 1977 (aged 23)	cm / kg	9	2						
13	MF	(Japan)	Yusuke Sato	November 2, 1977 (aged 23)	cm / kg	40	7						
14	FW	(Japan)	Gakuya Horii	July 3, 1975 (aged 25)	cm / kg	31	10						
15	DF	(Japan)	Takayuki Odajima	September 15, 1977 (aged 23)	cm / kg	0	0						
16	GK	(Japan)	Seiichi Saito	July 22, 1976 (aged 24)	cm / kg	0	0						
17	MF	(Japan)	Jun Kokubo	September 8, 1980 (aged 20)	cm / kg	9	0						
18	DF	(Japan)	Junji Sato	February 4, 1975 (aged 26)	cm / kg	1	0						
19	MF	(Japan)	Hideki Matsuda	September 2, 1981 (aged 19)	cm / kg	9	2						
20	FW	(Japan)	Ryosuke Nemoto	August 24, 1980 (aged 20)	cm / kg	32	13						
21	GK	(Japan)	Takeshi Saito	June 1, 1979 (aged 21)	cm / kg	1	0						
22	DF	(Japan)	Masakazu Washida	November 15, 1978 (aged 22)	cm / kg	44	4						
23	DF	(Japan)	Mitsumasa Yoda	August 7, 1977 (aged 23)	cm / kg	3	0						
24	DF	(Japan)	Tetsuro Uki	October 4, 1971 (aged 29)	cm / kg	39	0						
25	MF	(Japan)	Makoto Kasahara	July 6, 1981 (aged 19)	cm / kg	0	0						
26	DF	(Japan)	Kentaro Suzuki	June 2, 1980 (aged 20)	cm / kg	43	2						
27	MF	(Japan)	Ippei Saga	May 20, 1980 (aged 20)	cm / kg	20	1						
28	MF	(Japan)	Genichi Takahashi	June 28, 1980 (aged 20)	cm / kg	0	0						
29	MF	(Japan)	Issei Yoshimi	June 16, 1982 (aged 18)	cm / kg	2	0						

== Other pages ==
- (in Japanese) J. League official site
