= 2000 Montedio Yamagata season =

Japanese football team season

Montedio Yamagata
2000 season
- Manager: Shigeharu Ueki
- Stadium: Yamagata Park Stadium
- J.League 2: 10th
- Emperor's Cup: 2nd Round
- J.League Cup: 1st Round
- Top goalscorer: Kenji Takahashi (10)
Home colours	Away colours

2000 Montedio Yamagata season

== Competitions ==
Competitions	Position
J.League 2	10th / 11 clubs
Emperor's Cup	2nd round
J.League Cup	1st round

== Domestic results ==
=== J.League 2 ===
12 March 2000 1	Oita Trinita	3-1	Montedio Yamagata	Oita Athletic Stadium
JST (UTC+09)

2	bye

26 March 2000 3	Montedio Yamagata	1-2	Mito HollyHock	Yamagata Park Stadium
JST (UTC+09)

30 March 2000 4	Shonan Bellmare	5-2	Montedio Yamagata	Hiratsuka Athletics Stadium
JST (UTC+09)

2 April 2000 5	Montedio Yamagata	0-1	Omiya Ardija	Yamagata Park Stadium
JST (UTC+09)

9 April 2000 6	Sagan Tosu	2-0	Montedio Yamagata	Tosu Stadium
JST (UTC+09)

16 April 2000 7	Montedio Yamagata	4-2	Ventforet Kofu	Tsuruoka Komakihara Stadium
JST (UTC+09)

23 April 2000 8	Consadole Sapporo	0-2	Montedio Yamagata	Hakodate Chiyogadai Stadium
JST (UTC+09)

29 April 2000 9	Montedio Yamagata	1-2 (GG) (a.e.t.)	Albirex Niigata	Yamagata Park Stadium
JST (UTC+09)

4 May 2000 10	Vegalta Sendai	2-1	Montedio Yamagata	Sendai Stadium
JST (UTC+09)

7 May 2000 11	Montedio Yamagata	1-0	Urawa Red Diamonds	Yamagata Park Stadium
JST (UTC+09)

13 May 2000 12	Montedio Yamagata	0-2	Oita Trinita	Yamagata Park Stadium
JST (UTC+09)

13	bye

21 May 2000 14	Mito HollyHock	3-1	Montedio Yamagata	Hitachinaka City Stadium
JST (UTC+09)

27 May 2000 15	Montedio Yamagata	0-1	Shonan Bellmare	Yamagata Park Stadium
JST (UTC+09)

1 June 2000 16	Omiya Ardija	3-0	Montedio Yamagata	Omiya Football Stadium
JST (UTC+09)

4 June 2000 17	Montedio Yamagata	1-0	Sagan Tosu	Yamagata Park Stadium
JST (UTC+09)

11 June 2000 18	Ventforet Kofu	1-4	Montedio Yamagata	Kose Sports Park Stadium
JST (UTC+09)

17 June 2000 19	Montedio Yamagata	0-1	Consadole Sapporo	Yamagata Park Stadium
JST (UTC+09)

21 June 2000 20	Albirex Niigata	4-0	Montedio Yamagata	Niigata City Athletic Stadium
JST (UTC+09)

25 June 2000 21	Montedio Yamagata	0-1	Vegalta Sendai	Yamagata Park Stadium
JST (UTC+09)

1 July 2000 22	Urawa Red Diamonds	2-0	Montedio Yamagata	Urawa Komaba Stadium
JST (UTC+09)

8 July 2000 23	Shonan Bellmare	1-0 (GG) (a.e.t.)	Montedio Yamagata	Hiratsuka Athletics Stadium
JST (UTC+09)

22 July 2000 24	Montedio Yamagata	2-1	Omiya Ardija	Yamagata City Athletic Stadium
JST (UTC+09)

29 July 2000 25	Sagan Tosu	1-0	Montedio Yamagata	Tosu Stadium
JST (UTC+09)

2 August 2000 26	Montedio Yamagata	4-1	Ventforet Kofu	Yamagata City Athletic Stadium
JST (UTC+09)

5 August 2000 27	Consadole Sapporo	1-0	Montedio Yamagata	Sapporo Atsubetsu Park Stadium
JST (UTC+09)

12 August 2000 28	Montedio Yamagata	0-1	Albirex Niigata	Yamagata Park Stadium
JST (UTC+09)

19 August 2000 29	Vegalta Sendai	2-1 (GG) (a.e.t.)	Montedio Yamagata	Sendai Stadium
JST (UTC+09)

27 August 2000 30	Montedio Yamagata	1-2	Urawa Red Diamonds	Yamagata Park Stadium
JST (UTC+09)

2 September 2000 31	Oita Trinita	2-1	Montedio Yamagata	Oita Athletic Stadium
JST (UTC+09)

32	bye

17 September 2000 33	Montedio Yamagata	0-1	Mito HollyHock	Yamagata Park Stadium
JST (UTC+09)

23 September 2000 34	Omiya Ardija	2-1	Montedio Yamagata	Omiya Football Stadium
JST (UTC+09)

28 September 2000 35	Montedio Yamagata	2-0	Sagan Tosu	Yamagata Park Stadium
JST (UTC+09)

1 October 2000 36	Ventforet Kofu	3-2	Montedio Yamagata	Fujihokuroku Park Stadium
JST (UTC+09)

8 October 2000 37	Montedio Yamagata	0-0 (GG) (a.e.t.)	Consadole Sapporo	Yamagata Park Stadium
JST (UTC+09)

14 October 2000 38	Albirex Niigata	1-0	Montedio Yamagata	Niigata City Athletic Stadium
JST (UTC+09)

22 October 2000 39	Montedio Yamagata	1-2	Vegalta Sendai	Yamagata Park Stadium
JST (UTC+09)

29 October 2000 40	Urawa Red Diamonds	1-2 (GG) (a.e.t.)	Montedio Yamagata	Urawa Komaba Stadium
JST (UTC+09)

5 November 2000 41	Montedio Yamagata	2-2 (GG) (a.e.t.)	Oita Trinita	Tsuruoka Komakihara Stadium
JST (UTC+09)

42	bye

16 November 2000 43	Mito HollyHock	0-1 (GG) (a.e.t.)	Montedio Yamagata	Hitachinaka City Stadium
JST (UTC+09)

19 November 2000 44	Montedio Yamagata	1-0	Shonan Bellmare	Yamagata Park Stadium
JST (UTC+09)

=== Emperor's Cup ===
25 November 2000 1st Round	Saga Kita High School	0-12	Montedio Yamagata	Saga Stadium
JST (UTC+09)

3 December 2000 2nd Round	Montedio Yamagata	1-2	Jatco	Shizuoka Ashitaka Athletic Stadium
JST (UTC+09)

=== J.League Cup ===
12 April 2000 1st Round-1	Montedio Yamagata	0-3	Sanfrecce Hiroshima	Yamagata Park Stadium
JST (UTC+09)

19 April 2000 1st Round-2	Sanfrecce Hiroshima	0-1 (3-1 agg.)	Montedio Yamagata	Hiroshima Stadium
JST (UTC+09)

== Player statistics ==
No.	Pos.	Nat.	Player	D.o.B. (Age)	Height / Weight	J.League 2		Emperor's Cup		J.League Cup		Total	
No.	Pos.	Nat.	Player	D.o.B. (Age)	Height / Weight	Apps	Goals	Apps	Goals	Apps	Goals	Apps	Goals
1	GK	(Japan)	Katsumi Suzuki	April 21, 1969 (aged 30)	cm / kg	39	0						
2	DF	(Japan)	Toshihiko Uchiyama	October 21, 1978 (aged 21)	cm / kg	23	0						
3	DF	(Japan)	Masayuki Ota	June 17, 1973 (aged 26)	cm / kg	29	1						
4	DF	(Japan)	Hironari Iwamoto	June 27, 1970 (aged 29)	cm / kg	35	0						
5	DF	(Japan)	Yoshiaki Maruyama	October 12, 1974 (aged 25)	cm / kg	35	0						
6	MF	(Japan)	Kenji Takahashi	June 5, 1970 (aged 29)	cm / kg	36	10						
7	MF	(Japan)	Tatsuma Yoshida	June 9, 1974 (aged 25)	cm / kg	36	2						
8	MF	(Japan)	Teppei Nishiyama	February 22, 1975 (aged 25)	cm / kg	36	6						
9	FW	(Japan)	Satoshi Mashimo	March 6, 1974 (aged 26)	cm / kg	21	2						
10	MF	(Brazil)	Jeferson	October 19, 1972 (aged 27)	cm / kg	12	1						
11	MF	(Cameroon)	Edwin Ifeanyi	April 28, 1972 (aged 27)	cm / kg	32	3						
13	MF	(Japan)	Daisuke Nakamori	July 10, 1974 (aged 25)	cm / kg	11	0						
14	FW	(Japan)	Gakuya Horii	July 3, 1975 (aged 24)	cm / kg	35	7						
15	DF	(Japan)	Takayuki Odajima	September 15, 1977 (aged 22)	cm / kg	23	0						
16	GK	(Japan)	Seiichi Saito	July 22, 1976 (aged 23)	cm / kg	0	0						
17	MF	(Japan)	Jun Kokubo	September 8, 1980 (aged 19)	cm / kg	14	0						
18	DF	(Japan)	Junji Sato	February 4, 1975 (aged 25)	cm / kg	32	1						
19	MF	(Japan)	Hideki Matsuda	September 2, 1981 (aged 18)	cm / kg	8	0						
20	FW	(Japan)	Ryosuke Nemoto	August 24, 1980 (aged 19)	cm / kg	25	3						
21	GK	(Japan)	Takeshi Saito	June 1, 1979 (aged 20)	cm / kg	1	0						
22	DF	(Japan)	Masakazu Washida	November 15, 1978 (aged 21)	cm / kg	20	1						
23	DF	(Japan)	Mitsumasa Yoda	August 7, 1977 (aged 22)	cm / kg	8	0						
24	MF	(Japan)	Masayuki Okamura	May 18, 1977 (aged 22)	cm / kg	0	0						
25	MF	(Japan)	Makoto Kasahara	July 6, 1981 (aged 18)	cm / kg	0	0						
26	DF	(Japan)	Mubu Nakayama	September 28, 1978 (aged 21)	cm / kg	0	0						
27	DF	(Japan)	Sadayoshi Shirai	January 4, 1981 (aged 19)	cm / kg	0	0						
28	FW	(Brazil)	Washington	November 14, 1978 (aged 21)	cm / kg	15	1						
29	MF	(Japan)	Atsushi Nagai	December 23, 1974 (aged 25)	cm / kg	15	1						
