= Satoshi Mashimo =

Japanese footballer

Satoshi Mashimo 真下 佐登史
Personal information
- Full name: Satoshi Mashimo
- Date of birth: March 6, 1974 (age 52)
- Place of birth: Isesaki, Gunma, Japan
- Height: 1.77 m (5 ft 9 1/2 in)
- Position: Forward

Youth career
- 1989–1991: Maebashi Commercial High School
- 1992–1995: Senshu University

Senior career*
Years	Team	Apps	(Gls)
1996–2000	Montedio Yamagata		
2001–2002	Tonan SC	17	(4)
- * Club domestic league appearances and goals

Satoshi Mashimo (真下 佐登史, Mashimo Satoshi; born March 6, 1974) is a former Japanese football player.

== Playing career ==
Mashimo was born in Isesaki on March 6, 1974. After graduating from Senshu University, he joined Japan Football League club Montedio Yamagata in 1996. He played many matches as forward and the club was promoted to new league J2 League from 1999. In 1999, he played in all matches and scored 18 goals. This is 2nd place in scorer ranking after Takuya Jinno (19 goals). However he could hardly score goals in 2000 and was released from the club end of 2000 season. In 2001, he moved to his local club Tonan SC in Regional Leagues and played in 2 seasons.

== Club statistics ==
Club performance			League		Cup		League Cup		Total	
Season	Club	League	Apps	Goals	Apps	Goals	Apps	Goals	Apps	Goals
Japan			League		Emperor's Cup		J.League Cup		Total	
1996	Montedio Yamagata	Football League			1	0	-		1	0
1997	Montedio Yamagata	Football League			3	3	-		3	3
1998	Montedio Yamagata	Football League			2	0	-		2	0
1999	Montedio Yamagata	J2 League	36	18	4	2	2	1	42	21
2000	Montedio Yamagata	J2 League	21	2	1	0	1	0	23	2
Total			57	20	11	5	3	1	71	26
