= Kenji Takahashi (footballer, born 1970) =

Japanese footballer

Kenji Takahashi 高橋 健二
Personal information
- Full name: Kenji Takahashi
- Date of birth: June 5, 1970 (age 56)
- Place of birth: Yamagata, Japan
- Height: 1.74 m (5 ft 8 1/2 in)
- Position: Midfielder

Youth career
- 1986–1988: Nihon University Yamagata High School
- 1989–1993: Kokushikan University

Senior career*
Years	Team	Apps	(Gls)
1994–2006	Montedio Yamagata	416	(39)
Total		416	(39)
- * Club domestic league appearances and goals

Kenji Takahashi (高橋 健二, Takahashi Kenji; born June 5, 1970) is a former Japanese football player.

== Playing career ==
Takahashi was born in Yamagata Prefecture on June 5, 1970. After graduating from Kokushikan University, he joined newly was promoted to Japan Football League club, NEC Yamagata (later Montedio Yamagata) in 1994. He became a regular player from first season and played many matches for a long time. The club was promoted to new league J2 League from 1999. He played for the club in 13 seasons and retired end of 2006 season.

== Career statistics ==
Appearances and goals by club, season and competition
Club	Season	League			Emperor's Cup		J.League Cup		Total	
Club	Season	Division	Apps	Goals	Apps	Goals	Apps	Goals	Apps	Goals
NEC Yamagata	1994	Football League	24	4	1	0	—		25	4
NEC Yamagata	1995	Football League	24	6	—		—		24	6
Montedio Yamagata	1996	Football League	23	0	3	1	—		26	1
Montedio Yamagata	1997	Football League	28	1	3	0	—		31	1
Montedio Yamagata	1998	Football League	29	8	4	1	—		33	9
Montedio Yamagata	1999	J2 League	33	3	5	2	2	0	40	5
Montedio Yamagata	2000	J2 League	36	10	2	0	2	0	40	10
Montedio Yamagata	2001	J2 League	43	0	3	1	2	0	48	1
Montedio Yamagata	2002	J2 League	43	2	1	0	—		44	2
Montedio Yamagata	2003	J2 League	41	2	3	1	—		44	3
Montedio Yamagata	2004	J2 League	34	1	1	0	—		35	1
Montedio Yamagata	2005	J2 League	35	2	2	1	—		37	3
Montedio Yamagata	2006	J2 League	23	0	0	0	—		23	0
Career total			416	39	28	7	6	0	450	46
