= Katsumi Suzuki (footballer) =

Japanese footballer

Katsumi Suzuki 鈴木 克美
Personal information
- Full name: Katsumi Suzuki
- Date of birth: April 21, 1969 (age 57)
- Place of birth: Yamagata, Japan
- Height: 1.82 m (5 ft 11 1/2 in)
- Position: Goalkeeper

Youth career
- 1985–1987: Nihon University Yamagata High School

Senior career*
Years	Team	Apps	(Gls)
1988–2004	Montedio Yamagata		
- * Club domestic league appearances and goals

Katsumi Suzuki (鈴木 克美, Suzuki Katsumi; born April 21, 1969) is a former Japanese football player.

== Playing career ==
Suzuki was born in Yamagata Prefecture on April 21, 1969. After graduating from high school, he joined Prefectural Leagues club NEC Yamagata (later Montedio Yamagata) in 1988. He played many matches as goalkeeper and the club was promoted to Regional Leagues from 1990, Japan Football League from 1994 and J2 League from 1999. Although he played as regular player for a long time, his opportunity to play decreased behind Takeshi Saito and Shigeru Sakurai from 2002. He retired end of 2004 season.

== Career statistics ==
Appearances and goals by club, season and competition
Club	Season	League			Emperor's Cup		J.League Cup		Total	
Club	Season	Division	Apps	Goals	Apps	Goals	Apps	Goals	Apps	Goals
NEC Yamagata	1994	Football League	25	0	1	0	—		26	0
NEC Yamagata	1995	Football League	7	0	—		—		7	0
Montedio Yamagata	1996	Football League	26	0	3	0	—		29	0
Montedio Yamagata	1997	Football League	14	0	3	0	—		17	0
Montedio Yamagata	1998	Football League	30	0	4	0	—		34	0
Montedio Yamagata	1999	J2 League	33	0	2	0	2	0	37	0
Montedio Yamagata	2000	J2 League	39	0	2	0	2	0	43	0
Montedio Yamagata	2001	J2 League	43	0	2	0	1	0	46	0
Montedio Yamagata	2002	J2 League	23	0	0	0	—		23	0
Montedio Yamagata	2003	J2 League	0	0	0	0	—		0	0
Montedio Yamagata	2004	J2 League	0	0	0	0	—		0	0
Career total			240	0	17	0	5	0	264	0
