= Nakamori =

Nakamori (written: 中森) is a Japanese surname. Notable people with the surname include:

- Akina Nakamori (中森 明菜, born 1965), Japanese singer and actress
- Akio Nakamori (中森 明夫, born 1960), Japanese writer
- Chikako Nakamori (中森 智佳子, born 1967), Japanese swimmer
- Daisuke Nakamori (中森 大介, born 1974), Japanese footballer and manager
- Fukuyo Nakamori (中森 福代, born 1949), Japanese politician
