= Masayuki Ota =

Japanese footballer

Masayuki Ota 太田 雅之
Personal information
- Full name: Masayuki Ota
- Date of birth: June 17, 1973 (age 53)
- Place of birth: Tokyo, Japan
- Height: 1.76 m (5 ft 9 1/2 in)
- Position: Defender

Youth career
- 1989–1991: Shichirigahama High School
- 1992–1995: Kokushikan University

Senior career*
Years	Team	Apps	(Gls)
1996–2006	Montedio Yamagata	274	(7)
Total		274	(7)
- * Club domestic league appearances and goals

Masayuki Ota (太田 雅之, Ota Masayuki; born June 17, 1973) is a former Japanese football player.

== Playing career ==
Ota was born in Tokyo on June 17, 1973. After graduating from Kokushikan University, he joined Japan Football League club Montedio Yamagata in 1996. He played many matches as right and left side back from first season. The club was promoted to J2 League from 1999. He could not play many matches from 2005 and retired at the end of the 2006 season.

== Career statistics ==
Appearances and goals by club, season and competition
Club	Season	League			Emperor's Cup		J.League Cup		Total	
Club	Season	Division	Apps	Goals	Apps	Goals	Apps	Goals	Apps	Goals
Montedio Yamagata	1996	Football League	22	1	2	0	—		24	1
Montedio Yamagata	1997	Football League	28	1	3	1	—		31	2
Montedio Yamagata	1998	Football League	20	2	3	0	—		23	2
Montedio Yamagata	1999	J2 League	32	1	0	0	0	0	32	1
Montedio Yamagata	2000	J2 League	29	1	2	0	2	0	33	1
Montedio Yamagata	2001	J2 League	40	1	3	0	2	0	45	1
Montedio Yamagata	2002	J2 League	38	0	1	0	—		39	0
Montedio Yamagata	2003	J2 League	29	0	2	0	—		31	0
Montedio Yamagata	2004	J2 League	28	0	0	0	—		28	0
Montedio Yamagata	2005	J2 League	5	0	1	1	—		6	1
Montedio Yamagata	2006	J2 League	3	0	0	0	—		3	0
Career total			274	7	17	2	4	0	295	9
