= 2007 Montedio Yamagata season =

Montedio Yamagata
2007 season
- Manager: Yasuhiro Higuchi
- Stadium: ND Soft Stadium Yamagata
- J. League 2: 9th
- Emperor's Cup: 4th Round
- Top goalscorer: Takuya Yokoyama (8); Tomotaka Kitamura (8)

2007 Montedio Yamagata season

== Competitions ==
Competitions	Position
J. League 2	9th / 13 clubs
Emperor's Cup	4th Round

== Domestic results ==
=== J. League 2 ===
Match	Date	Venue	Opponents	Score
1	2007..			-
2	2007..			-
3	2007..			-
4	2007..			-
5	2007..			-
6	2007..			-
7	2007..			-
8	2007..			-
9	2007..			-
10	2007..			-
11	2007..			-
12	2007..			-
13	2007..			-
14	2007..			-
15	2007..			-
16	2007..			-
17	2007..			-
18	2007..			-
19	2007..			-
20	2007..			-
21	2007..			-
22	2007..			-
23	2007..			-
24	2007..			-
25	2007..			-
26	2007..			-
27	2007..			-
28	2007..			-
29	2007..			-
30	2007..			-
31	2007..			-
32	2007..			-
33	2007..			-
34	2007..			-
35	2007..			-
36	2007..			-
37	2007..			-
38	2007..			-
39	2007..			-
40	2007..			-
41	2007..			-
42	2007..			-
43	2007..			-
44	2007..			-
45	2007..			-
46	2007..			-
47	2007..			-
48	2007..			-

=== Emperor's Cup ===
Match	Date	Venue	Opponents	Score
3rd Round	2007..			-
4th Round	2007..			-

== Player statistics ==
No.	Pos.	Player	D.o.B. (Age)	Height / Weight	J. League 2		Emperor's Cup		Total	
No.	Pos.	Player	D.o.B. (Age)	Height / Weight	Apps	Goals	Apps	Goals	Apps	Goals
1	GK	Kenta Shimizu	September 18, 1981 (aged 25)	cm / kg	48	0				
2	DF	Masakazu Washida	November 15, 1978 (aged 28)	cm / kg	21	0				
3	DF	Leonardo	July 22, 1982 (aged 24)	cm / kg	43	1				
4	DF	Shogo Kobara	November 2, 1982 (aged 24)	cm / kg	35	2				
5	MF	Takumi Watanabe	March 15, 1982 (aged 24)	cm / kg	31	2				
6	MF	Hayato Sasaki	November 29, 1982 (aged 24)	cm / kg	35	2				
7	MF	Katsuyuki Miyazawa	September 15, 1976 (aged 30)	cm / kg	44	4				
8	MF	Takumi Motohashi	August 3, 1982 (aged 24)	cm / kg	21	0				
9	FW	Takuya Yokoyama	June 29, 1985 (aged 21)	cm / kg	38	8				
10	MF	Nobuyuki Zaizen	October 19, 1976 (aged 30)	cm / kg	38	1				
11	FW	Yohei Toyoda	April 11, 1985 (aged 21)	cm / kg	29	6				
13	DF	Tatsuya Ishikawa	December 25, 1979 (aged 27)	cm / kg	46	2				
14	FW	Kohei Hayashi	June 27, 1978 (aged 28)	cm / kg	19	2				
15	DF	Kazuya Maeda	January 8, 1984 (aged 23)	cm / kg	4	0				
16	DF	Kohei Usui	July 16, 1979 (aged 27)	cm / kg	27	2				
17	DF	Makoto Kimura	June 10, 1979 (aged 27)	cm / kg	9	0				
18	DF	Kenta Kifuji	October 5, 1981 (aged 25)	cm / kg	13	1				
19	MF	Masaru Akiba	February 19, 1984 (aged 23)	cm / kg	43	3				
20	FW	Ryosuke Nemoto	August 24, 1980 (aged 26)	cm / kg	17	2				
21	GK	Taishi Endo	March 31, 1980 (aged 26)	cm / kg	0	0				
22	DF	Takuya Sonoda	November 23, 1984 (aged 22)	cm / kg	11	0				
23	MF	Ryohei Suzuki	July 30, 1983 (aged 23)	cm / kg	0	0				
24	FW	Shogo Sakai	January 28, 1988 (aged 19)	cm / kg	15	0				
25	FW	Shunta Takahashi	February 9, 1989 (aged 18)	cm / kg	0	0				
26	FW	Tomotaka Kitamura	May 27, 1982 (aged 24)	cm / kg	43	8				
27	GK	Yuta Suzuki	May 28, 1987 (aged 19)	cm / kg	0	0				
28	MF	Kentaro Sato	August 14, 1984 (aged 22)	cm / kg	10	0				
29	DF	Kosuke Suda	February 4, 1980 (aged 27)	cm / kg	19	0				
31	FW	Gustavo	July 7, 1984 (aged 22)	cm / kg	2	0				

== Other pages ==
- (in Japanese) J. League official site
