= 2004 Montedio Yamagata season =

Montedio Yamagata
2004 season
- Manager: Jun Suzuki
- Stadium: Yamagata Park Stadium
- J. League 2: 4th
- Emperor's Cup: 4th Round
- Top goalscorer: Hideo Oshima (22)
Home colours	Away colours

During the 2004 season, Montedio Yamagata competed in the J. League 2, in which they finished 4th.

== Competitions ==
Competitions	Position
J. League 2	4th / 12 clubs
Emperor's Cup	4th Round

== Domestic results ==
=== J. League 2 ===
Match	Date	Venue	Opponents	Score
1	2004..	[[]]	[[]]	-
2	2004..	[[]]	[[]]	-
3	2004..	[[]]	[[]]	-
4	2004..	[[]]	[[]]	-
5	2004..	[[]]	[[]]	-
6	2004..	[[]]	[[]]	-
7	2004..	[[]]	[[]]	-
8	2004..	[[]]	[[]]	-
9	2004..	[[]]	[[]]	-
10	2004..	[[]]	[[]]	-
11	2004..	[[]]	[[]]	-
12	2004..	[[]]	[[]]	-
13	2004..	[[]]	[[]]	-
14	2004..	[[]]	[[]]	-
15	2004..	[[]]	[[]]	-
16	2004..	[[]]	[[]]	-
17	2004..	[[]]	[[]]	-
18	2004..	[[]]	[[]]	-
19	2004..	[[]]	[[]]	-
20	2004..	[[]]	[[]]	-
21	2004..	[[]]	[[]]	-
22	2004..	[[]]	[[]]	-
23	2004..	[[]]	[[]]	-
24	2004..	[[]]	[[]]	-
25	2004..	[[]]	[[]]	-
26	2004..	[[]]	[[]]	-
27	2004..	[[]]	[[]]	-
28	2004..	[[]]	[[]]	-
29	2004..	[[]]	[[]]	-
30	2004..	[[]]	[[]]	-
31	2004..	[[]]	[[]]	-
32	2004..	[[]]	[[]]	-
33	2004..	[[]]	[[]]	-
34	2004..	[[]]	[[]]	-
35	2004..	[[]]	[[]]	-
36	2004..	[[]]	[[]]	-
37	2004..	[[]]	[[]]	-
38	2004..	[[]]	[[]]	-
39	2004..	[[]]	[[]]	-
40	2004..	[[]]	[[]]	-
41	2004..	[[]]	[[]]	-
42	2004..	[[]]	[[]]	-
43	2004..	[[]]	[[]]	-
44	2004..	[[]]	[[]]	-

=== Emperor's Cup ===
Match	Date	Venue	Opponents	Score
3rd Round	2004..	[[]]	[[]]	-
4th Round	2004..	[[]]	[[]]	-

== Player statistics ==
No.	Pos.	Player	D.o.B. (Age)	Height / Weight	J. League 2		Emperor's Cup		Total	
No.	Pos.	Player	D.o.B. (Age)	Height / Weight	Apps	Goals	Apps	Goals	Apps	Goals
1	GK	Katsumi Suzuki	April 21, 1969 (aged 34)	cm / kg	0	0				
2	DF	Masayuki Ota	June 17, 1973 (aged 30)	cm / kg	28	0				
3	DF	Tsuyoshi Furukawa	September 21, 1972 (aged 31)	cm / kg	22	1				
4	DF	Teruaki Kobayashi	June 20, 1979 (aged 24)	cm / kg	43	2				
5	DF	Shinya Sakoi	May 8, 1977 (aged 26)	cm / kg	24	0				
6	MF	Shinji Otsuka	December 29, 1975 (aged 28)	cm / kg	40	3				
7	MF	Kenji Takahashi	June 5, 1970 (aged 33)	cm / kg	34	1				
8	MF	Atsushi Nagai	December 23, 1974 (aged 29)	cm / kg	38	2				
9	FW	Hideo Ōshima	March 7, 1980 (aged 24)	cm / kg	43	22				
10	MF	Denni	August 21, 1982 (aged 21)	cm / kg	20	2				
11	MF	Daisuke Hoshi	December 10, 1980 (aged 23)	cm / kg	39	5				
13	DF	Toshihiko Uchiyama	October 21, 1978 (aged 25)	cm / kg	28	1				
14	DF	Yuki Inoue	October 31, 1977 (aged 26)	cm / kg	8	2				
15	FW	Masatoshi Matsuda	September 4, 1980 (aged 23)	cm / kg	5	1				
16	GK	Shigeru Sakurai	June 29, 1979 (aged 24)	cm / kg	40	0				
17	FW	Kosei Nakamura	April 5, 1981 (aged 22)	cm / kg	9	2				
18	MF	Kentaro Kawasaki	December 18, 1982 (aged 21)	cm / kg	14	0				
19	MF	Masaru Akiba	February 19, 1984 (aged 20)	cm / kg	31	1				
20	FW	Ryosuke Nemoto	August 24, 1980 (aged 23)	cm / kg	24	4				
21	GK	Koichi Ae	April 15, 1976 (aged 27)	cm / kg	4	0				
22	MF	Hayato Ochi	July 17, 1982 (aged 21)	cm / kg	0	0				
23	FW	Kohei Hayashi	June 27, 1978 (aged 25)	cm / kg	40	4				
24	MF	Takeshi Iseki	June 16, 1985 (aged 18)	cm / kg	0	0				
25	FW	Daisuke Horiuchi	April 21, 1985 (aged 18)	cm / kg	0	0				
26	DF	Naoya Otaki	June 11, 1984 (aged 19)	cm / kg	0	0				
27	DF	Leonardo	July 22, 1982 (aged 21)	cm / kg	38	0				
28	MF	Katsuyuki Miyazawa	September 15, 1976 (aged 27)	cm / kg	22	2				
29	FW	Naoya Umeda	April 27, 1978 (aged 25)	cm / kg	12	2				

== Other pages ==
- (in Japanese) J. League official site
