= Tatsuma Yoshida =

Japanese footballer and manager

Tatsuma Yoshida 吉田 達磨
Personal information
- Full name: Tatsuma Yoshida
- Date of birth: June 9, 1974 (age 52)
- Place of birth: Chiba, Japan
- Height: 1.72 m (5 ft 8 in)
- Position: Midfielder

Team information
- Current team: Kyoto Sanga (Assistant Manager)

Senior career*
Years	Team	Apps	(Gls)
1993–1996	Kashiwa Reysol	4	(1)
1997–1998	Kyoto Purple Sanga	7	(0)
1999–2001	Montedio Yamagata	94	(7)
2002	Jurong Town	2	(0)
Total		107	(8)

Managerial career
- 2006–2008: Kashiwa Reysol (assistant)
- 2003–2006: Kashiwa Reysol (academy)
- 2010–2011: Kashiwa Reysol (director of youth)
- 2011–2012: Kashiwa Reysol (technical director)
- 2012–2015: Kashiwa Reysol (sporting director)
- 2015–2016: Kashiwa Reysol
- 2016: Albirex Niigata
- 2017–2018: Ventforet Kofu
- 2019–2021: Singapore
- 2022: Ventforet Kofu
- 2023–2024: Tokushima Vortis
- 2024–2025: Daejeon Hana Citizen (assistant)
- 2026–: Kyoto Sanga (assistant)
- * Club domestic league appearances and goals

Tatsuma Yoshida (吉田 達磨, Yoshida Tatsuma; born 9 June 1974) is a Japanese football manager and former player. He was previously the head coach of the Singapore national team, serving from 2019 to 2021 which he was famously known in the country for enhancing Singapore fluidity football.

As a player, Tatsuma spent the majority of his career with Montedio Yamagata.

== Early life ==
Tatsuma was born in Chiba Prefecture on June 9, 1974.

== Playing career ==
=== Youth career ===
During Tatsuma junior high school years, he played for the Hitachi Junior Youth Soccer Club.

=== Senior career ===
After graduating from Urayasu High School, (Note: ja:千葉県立浦安高等学校) Tatsuma joined his local club Kashiwa Reysol in 1993. In 1997, he moved to Kyoto Purple Sanga.

In 1999, Tatsuma moved to newly promoted J2 League club, Montedio Yamagata. He became a regular for them, playing as a defensive midfielder. During the final day of the 1999 J.League Division 2 season, Yoshida scored a late long range free kick goal against Oita Trinita, denying their chances of being promoted to the J.League Division 1.

In 2002, he moved to Singapore and played for Jurong FC in the S-League (now Singapore Premier League). After five appearances, he retired at the end of the 2002 season.

== Coaching career ==
=== Return to Kashiwa Reysol ===
Tatsuma returned to Kashiwa Reysol in 2003 and spent seven years as director of the club's academy, where he helped to establish it as one of the best in the country. Japan internationals Hiroki Sakai, Masato Kudo and Kosuke Nakamura were groomed during his time there. Tatsuma spent a further three years as Reysol's sports director before succeeding as head coach for the 2015 J1 season on a two-year contract.

In his first season, Tatsuma produced a respectable performance at the 2015 AFC Champions League, reaching the quarter-finals before losing to Guangzhou Evergrande, the eventual winners of the competition that year. Reysol had also finished at the semi-finals of that year's Emperor's Cup. However, performances in the domestic league was lacklustre, and Tatsuma stint was cut short.

=== Albriex Niigata ===
In 2016, Tatsuma was appointed as head coach of Albirex Niigata until he was sacked on 27 September 2016 for poor performances

=== Ventforet Kofu ===
Tatsuma was appointed as Ventforet Kofu head coach in 2017. Ventforet was relegated to J2 League at the end of 2017 J1 League season and Tatsuma was subsequently dismissed in April 2018.

=== Singapore ===
On 30 May 2019, Tatsuma was unveiled as the head coach of the Singapore national team. Yoshida's first game in change for the national team began with a 4–3 victory against the Solomon Islands at the National Stadium. Yoshida extended his contract in 2021, but ended his stint by mutual agreement citing family reasons on 28 December that same year shortly after the 2020 AFF Suzuki Cup, whereby the Singapore team impressively reached the semi-finals after nine years.

=== Return to Ventforet Kofu ===
On 3 January 2022, the club confirmed that he will return to the club for the 2022 J2 League season. On 16 October 2022, he brought his club won 2022 Emperor's Cup for the first time in history thus qualifying them to their debut 2023–24 AFC Champions League group stage appearances.

=== Tokushima Vortis ===
In August 2023, Yoshida was appointed manager of J2 League club Tokushima Vortis following the mid-season departure of Beñat Labaien. They finished the season in 15th place. Following a disappointing start to the 2024 season with only 4 points from 7 games, Yoshida was dismissed on 31 March.

== Club statistics ==
Club performance			League		Cup		League Cup		Total	
Season	Club	League	Apps	Goals	Apps	Goals	Apps	Goals	Apps	Goals
Japan			League		Emperor's Cup		J.League Cup		Total	
1993	Kashiwa Reysol	JFL								
1994	Kashiwa Reysol	JFL								
1995	Kashiwa Reysol	J1 League	0	0	0	0	-		0	0
1996	Kashiwa Reysol	J1 League	4	1	0	0	1	0	5	1
1997	Kyoto Purple Sanga	J1 League	2	0	0	0	0	0	2	0
1998	Kyoto Purple Sanga	J1 League	5	0	0	0	0	0	5	0
1999	Montedio Yamagata	J2 League	34	5	4	0	2	0	40	5
2000	Montedio Yamagata	J2 League	36	2	2	0	2	0	40	2
2001	Montedio Yamagata	J2 League	24	0	0	0	2	0	26	0
2002	Jurong	Singapore Premier League	2	0	3	0	0	0	5	0
Total			105	8	6	0	7	0	118	8

== Managerial statistics ==
As of match played 25 December 2021

Team	From	To	Record				
Team	From	To	G	W	D	L	Win %
Kashiwa Reysol	1 February 2015	31 January 2016	50	19	13	18	38.00
Albirex Niigata	1 February 2016	27 September 2016	38	12	7	19	31.58
Ventforet Kofu	1 February 2017	30 April 2018	56	12	19	25	21.43
Singapore	30 May 2019	28 December 2021	19	13	4	2	68.42
Ventforet Kofu	1 Feb 2022	31 January 2023	22	7	9	6	31.82
Total			185	63	52	70	34.05

== Honours ==
=== Manager ===
Ventforet Kofu

- Emperor's Cup: 2022
