= Ryosuke Nemoto =

Japanese footballer

Ryosuke Nemoto 根本 亮助
Personal information
- Full name: Ryosuke Nemoto
- Date of birth: August 24, 1980 (age 46)
- Place of birth: Tsuruoka, Yamagata, Japan
- Height: 1.69 m (5 ft 6 1/2 in)
- Position: Forward

Youth career
- 1996–1998: Tsurusho Gakuen High School

Senior career*
Years	Team	Apps	(Gls)
1999–2008	Montedio Yamagata	210	(35)
Total		210	(35)
- * Club domestic league appearances and goals

Ryosuke Nemoto (根本 亮助, Nemoto Ryōsuke; born August 24, 1980) is a former Japanese football player. He spent his career playing for Japan club Montedio Yamagata.

== Career ==
=== Club career ===
Nemoto was born in Tsuruoka on August 24, 1980. After graduating from high school, he joined newly was promoted to J2 League club, Montedio Yamagata based in his local in 1999. He played many matches as forward from first season. The club won the 2nd place in 2008 and was promoted to J1 League first time in club history. However he retired end of 2008 season without playing J1.

=== Managerial career ===
After retiring, he became an academy coach for Montedio Yamagata youth team. In 2024, he has been pointed as the coach for Tsuruoka Higashi High School football club.

== Career statistics ==
Appearances and goals by club, season and competition
Club	Season	League			Emperor's Cup		J.League Cup		Total	
Club	Season	Division	Apps	Goals	Apps	Goals	Apps	Goals	Apps	Goals
Montedio Yamagata	1999	J2 League	11	0	2	0	1	0	14	0
Montedio Yamagata	2000	J2 League	25	3	2	3	1	0	28	6
Montedio Yamagata	2001	J2 League	32	13	3	1	1	0	36	14
Montedio Yamagata	2002	J2 League	38	4	1	0	—		39	4
Montedio Yamagata	2003	J2 League	5	0	0	0	—		5	0
Montedio Yamagata	2004	J2 League	24	4	0	0	—		24	4
Montedio Yamagata	2005	J2 League	25	5	2	0	—		27	5
Montedio Yamagata	2006	J2 League	18	3	0	0	—		18	3
Montedio Yamagata	2007	J2 League	17	2	1	2	—		18	4
Montedio Yamagata	2008	J2 League	15	1	0	0	—		15	1
Career total			210	35	11	6	3	0	224	41

== See also ==
- List of one-club men in association football
