= Mitsumasa Yoda =

Japanese footballer

Mitsumasa Yoda 依田 光正
Personal information
- Full name: Mitsumasa Yoda
- Date of birth: August 7, 1977 (age 49)
- Place of birth: Tokyo, Japan
- Height: 1.75 m (5 ft 9 in)
- Position: Defender

Team information
- Current team: Thespa Gunma (manager)

Youth career
- 1993–1995: Teikyo High School

College career
Years	Team	Apps	(Gls)
1996–1999	Teikyo University		

Senior career*
Years	Team	Apps	(Gls)
2000–2003	Montedio Yamagata	42	(0)
2004–2006	Thespa Kusatsu	45	(0)
Total		87	(0)

Managerial career
- 2023: Fukushima United FC
- 2026–: Thespa Gunma
- * Club domestic league appearances and goals

Mitsumasa Yoda (依田 光正, Yoda Mitsumasa; born August 7, 1977) is a Japanese football manager and former footballer who is manager of J3 League club Thespa Gunma.

== Playing career ==
Yoda was born in Tokyo on August 7, 1977. After graduating from Teikyo University, he joined J2 League club Montedio Yamagata in 2000. He played many matches as right side back from first season. In 2004, he moved to Japan Football League club Thespa Kusatsu. He played many matches and the club was promoted to J2 from 2005. He retired at the end of the 2006 season.

== Career statistics ==
Appearances and goals by club, season and competition
Club	Season	League			Emperor's Cup		J.League Cup		Total	
Club	Season	Division	Apps	Goals	Apps	Goals	Apps	Goals	Apps	Goals
Montedio Yamagata	2000	J2 League	8	0	0	0	0	0	8	0
Montedio Yamagata	2001	J2 League	3	0	1	0	0	0	4	0
Montedio Yamagata	2002	J2 League	19	0	1	0	—		20	0
Montedio Yamagata	2003	J2 League	12	0	1	0	—		13	0
Thespa Kusatsu	2004	Football League	13	0			—		13	0
Thespa Kusatsu	2005	J2 League	18	0			—		18	0
Thespa Kusatsu	2006	J2 League	14	0			—		14	0
Career total			87	0	3	0	0	0	90	0
