= Hideki Matsuda =

Japanese footballer

Hideki Matsuda 松田 英樹
Personal information
- Full name: Hideki Matsuda
- Date of birth: September 2, 1981 (age 45)
- Place of birth: Minokamo, Gifu, Japan
- Height: 1.74 m (5 ft 8 1/2 in)
- Position: Midfielder

Youth career
- 1997–1999: Kakamihara High School

Senior career*
Years	Team	Apps	(Gls)
2000–2002	Montedio Yamagata	25	(3)
2003–2004	Shizuoka FC		
2004–2005	TDK		
2007	Okinawa Kariyushi FC	19	(1)
2008	TDK	33	(8)
2009–2012	FC Ryukyu	78	(14)
Total		155	(26)
- * Club domestic league appearances and goals

Hideki Matsuda (松田 英樹, Matsuda Hideki; born September 2, 1981) is a former Japanese football player.

== Playing career ==
Matsuda was born in Minokamo on September 2, 1981. After graduating from high school, he joined J2 League club Montedio Yamagata in 2000. He played several matches every season from first season. However he could not play many matches. In 2003, he moved to Regional Leagues club Shizuoka FC. In the middle of 2004, he moved to Regional Leagues club TDK and played until 2005. After 1 year blank, he moved to Regional Leagues club Okinawa Kariyushi FC and played many matches. In 2008, he moved to Japan Football League (JFL) club TDK again. He played many matches as regular player. In 2009, JFL club FC Ryukyu. He played many matches as regular player until 2010. However his opportunity to play decreased from 2011 and he could not play at all in the match in 2012. He retired end of 2012 season.

== Club statistics ==
Club performance			League		Cup		League Cup		Total	
Season	Club	League	Apps	Goals	Apps	Goals	Apps	Goals	Apps	Goals
Japan			League		Emperor's Cup		J.League Cup		Total	
2000	Montedio Yamagata	J2 League	8	0	0	0	1	0	9	0
2001	Montedio Yamagata	J2 League	9	2	3	0	1	0	13	2
2002	Montedio Yamagata	J2 League	8	1	1	0	-		9	1
2003	Shizuoka FC	Regional Leagues								
2004	Shizuoka FC	Regional Leagues								
2004	TDK	Regional Leagues								
2005	TDK	Regional Leagues	10	6	1	0	-		11	6
2007	Okinawa Kariyushi FC	Regional Leagues	19	1	3	1	-		22	2
2008	TDK	Football League	33	8	1	0	-		34	8
2009	FC Ryukyu	Football League	34	5	-		-		34	5
2010	FC Ryukyu	Football League	32	8	2	1	-		34	9
2011	FC Ryukyu	Football League	12	1	0	0	-		12	1
2012	FC Ryukyu	Football League	0	0	0	0	-		0	0
Total			165	32	11	2	2	0	178	34
