= Daisuke Nakamori =

Japanese footballer and manager

Daisuke Nakamori 中森 大介
Personal information
- Full name: Daisuke Nakamori
- Date of birth: July 10, 1974 (age 52)
- Place of birth: Yamato, Kanagawa, Japan
- Height: 1.75 m (5 ft 9 in)
- Position: Midfielder

Youth career
- 1990–1992: Kojo High School
- 1993–1996: Takushoku University

Senior career*
Years	Team	Apps	(Gls)
1997–2000	Montedio Yamagata		
2001	Jatco TT		
2002–2008	Sagawa Printing		

Managerial career
- 2008–2012: Sagawa Printing
- * Club domestic league appearances and goals

Daisuke Nakamori (中森 大介, Nakamori Daisuke; born July 10, 1974) is a former Japanese football player and manager.

== Playing career ==
Nakamori was born in Yamato on July 10, 1974. After graduating from Takushoku University, he joined Japan Football League club Montedio Yamagata in 1997. The club was promoted to new league J2 League in 1999. In 2000, he moved to Japan Football League club Jatco TT. In 2002, he moved to Regional Leagues club Sagawa Printing. The club was promoted to JFL from 2003. In 2008, he played as playing manager and retired from playing career end of 2008 season.

== Coaching career ==
In 2008, when Nakamori played for Japan Football League club Sagawa Printing, he became a playing manager. He managed the club until 2012.

== Career statistics ==
Appearances and goals by club, season and competition
Club	Season	League			Emperor's Cup		J.League Cup		Total	
Club	Season	Division	Apps	Goals	Apps	Goals	Apps	Goals	Apps	Goals
Montedio Yamagata	1997	Football League								
Montedio Yamagata	1998	Football League								
Montedio Yamagata	1999	J2 League	15	0			1	0	16	0
Montedio Yamagata	2000	J2 League	11	0			2	0	13	0
Career total			26	0	0	0	3	0	29	0
