= Toshihiko Uchiyama (footballer, born 1978) =

Japanese footballer

Toshihiko Uchiyama 内山 俊彦
Personal information
- Full name: Toshihiko Uchiyama
- Date of birth: October 21, 1978 (age 48)
- Place of birth: Izumi, Kagoshima, Japan
- Height: 1.80 m (5 ft 11 in)
- Position: Defender

Youth career
- Reimei High School

Senior career*
Years	Team	Apps	(Gls)
1998–2006	Montedio Yamagata	207	(7)
2007–2009	Vissel Kobe	58	(1)
2010–2011	Ventforet Kofu	53	(5)
2012	Vegalta Sendai	8	(1)
Total		326	(14)
Medal record
Vegalta Sendai
Runner-up	J1 League	2012
- * Club domestic league appearances and goals

Toshihiko Uchiyama (内山 俊彦, Uchiyama Toshihiko; born October 21, 1978) is a former Japanese football player.

== Playing career ==
Uchiyama was born in Izumi on October 21, 1978. After graduating from high school, he joined Japan Football League club Montedio Yamagata in 1998. The club was promoted to new league J2 League from 1999. He played many matches as left side back and became a regular player from 2003. In 2007, he moved to J1 League club Vissel Kobe. Although he played as regular left side back in early 2007, he lost regular position behind Hiroto Mogi the middle of 2007. In 2008, he became a regular player because Mogi got hurt. However his opportunity to play decreased in 2009. In 2010, he moved to J2 club Ventforet Kofu. He played many matches as regular player and the club was promoted to J1 from 2011. In 2012, he moved to Vegalta Sendai. However he could not play many matches and retired at the end of the 2012 season.

== Career statistics ==
Appearances and goals by club, season and competition
Club	Season	League			Emperor's Cup		J.League Cup		Total	
Club	Season	Division	Apps	Goals	Apps	Goals	Apps	Goals	Apps	Goals
Montedio Yamagata	1998	Football League	6	1	0	0	—		6	1
Montedio Yamagata	1999	J2 League	15	0	4	1	1	0	20	1
Montedio Yamagata	2000	J2 League	23	0	1	0	2	0	26	0
Montedio Yamagata	2001	J2 League	14	0	0	0	0	0	14	0
Montedio Yamagata	2002	J2 League	13	0	1	0	—		14	0
Montedio Yamagata	2003	J2 League	33	0	3	1	—		36	1
Montedio Yamagata	2004	J2 League	28	1	2	0	—		30	1
Montedio Yamagata	2005	J2 League	41	2	1	0	—		42	2
Montedio Yamagata	2006	J2 League	34	3	1	1	—		35	4
Vissel Kobe	2007	J1 League	19	0	0	0	4	0	23	0
Vissel Kobe	2008	J1 League	27	1	1	0	6	0	34	1
Vissel Kobe	2009	J1 League	12	0	1	0	4	0	17	0
Ventforet Kofu	2010	J2 League	33	4	1	0	—		34	4
Ventforet Kofu	2011	J1 League	20	1	2	1	0	0	22	2
Vegalta Sendai	2012	J1 League	8	1	1	0	4	0	13	1
Career total			326	14	19	4	21	0	366	18
