= Masakazu Washida =

Japanese footballer

Masakazu Washida 鷲田 雅一
Personal information
- Full name: Masakazu Washida
- Date of birth: November 15, 1978 (age 47)
- Place of birth: Fukui, Japan
- Height: 1.83 m (6 ft 0 in)
- Position: Defender

Youth career
- 1994–1996: Maruoka High School

Senior career*
Years	Team	Apps	(Gls)
1997–1998	JEF United Ichihara	0	(0)
1999–2003	Montedio Yamagata	161	(7)
2004	JEF United Ichihara	0	(0)
2005–2006	Kyoto Purple Sanga	18	(0)
2007	Montedio Yamagata	21	(0)
2008	Tochigi SC	31	(0)
2009–2010	FC Ryukyu	24	(1)
2010	SC Sagamihara		
Total		255	(8)
Medal record
JEF United Ichihara
Runner-up	J.League Cup	1998
- * Club domestic league appearances and goals

Masakazu Washida (鷲田 雅一, Washida Masakazu; born November 15, 1978) is a former Japanese football player.

== Playing career ==
Washida was born in Fukui on November 15, 1978. After graduating from high school, he joined J1 League club JEF United Ichihara in 1997. However he could not play at all in the match until 1998. In 1999, he moved to newly was promoted to J2 League club, Montedio Yamagata. He played many matches as center back from 1999 and became a regular player from 2001. In 2004, he returned to JEF United Ichihara. However he could hardly play in the match. In 2005, he moved to J2 club Kyoto Purple Sanga. Although the club won the champions in 2005 and was promoted to J1 from 2006, he could not play many matches in both seasons. In 2007, he moved to J2 club Montedio Yamagata again and played many matches. In 2008, he moved to Japan Football League (JFL) club Tochigi SC. He played as regular player and the club was promoted to J2 end of 2008 season. However he moved to JFL club FC Ryukyu in 2009. Although he played many matches in 2009, he could not play at all in the match in 2010. In June 2010, he moved to Prefectural Leagues club SC Sagamihara. He retired at the end of the 2010 season.

== Club statistics ==
Club performance			League		Cup		League Cup		Total	
Season	Club	League	Apps	Goals	Apps	Goals	Apps	Goals	Apps	Goals
Japan			League		Emperor's Cup		J.League Cup		Total	
1997	JEF United Ichihara	J1 League	0	0	0	0	0	0	0	0
1998	JEF United Ichihara	J1 League	0	0	0	0	0	0	0	0
1999	Montedio Yamagata	J2 League	18	0	1	0	2	0	21	0
2000	Montedio Yamagata	J2 League	20	1	2	0	2	0	24	1
2001	Montedio Yamagata	J2 League	44	4	3	0	2	0	49	4
2002	Montedio Yamagata	J2 League	43	1	1	0	-		44	1
2003	Montedio Yamagata	J2 League	36	1	0	0	-		36	1
2004	JEF United Ichihara	J1 League	0	0	0	0	2	0	2	0
2005	Kyoto Purple Sanga	J2 League	13	0	1	0	-		14	0
2006	Kyoto Purple Sanga	J1 League	5	0	0	0	2	0	7	0
2007	Montedio Yamagata	J2 League	21	0	1	0	-		22	0
2008	Tochigi SC	Football League	31	0	2	0	-		33	0
2009	FC Ryukyu	Football League	24	1	-		-		24	1
2010	FC Ryukyu	Football League	0	0	-		-		0	0
Career total			255	8	11	0	10	0	276	8
