= Washington (footballer, born November 1978) =

Brazilian footballer

Personal information
- Full name: Washington Luigi Garcia
- Date of birth: 14 November 1978 (age 47)
- Place of birth: São Paulo, Brazil
- Height: 1.80 m (5 ft 11 in)
- Position: Forward

Senior career*
Years	Team	Apps	(Gls)
1999–2001	São Paulo		
2000	Montedio Yamagata	15	(1)
2002	Molenbeek		
2003	Volgar-Gazprom Astrakhan	18	(3)
2004–2005	Ponte Preta		
2005–2006	Goias		
2006–2007	Gama		
2007–2008	São Bento		
2008–2009	ASA		
2009	Indios	1	(0)
2010	Volta Redonda		
- * Club domestic league appearances and goals

Washington Luigi Garcia (born November 14, 1978), known as Washington, is a former Brazilian football player.

== Career ==
Born in Sao Paulo, Washington began playing professional football as a striker with São Paulo FC. He embarked on a journeyman's career, with stints in Japan, Belgium, Russia and Mexico.

== Club statistics ==
Club performance			League		Cup		League Cup		Total	
Season	Club	League	Apps	Goals	Apps	Goals	Apps	Goals	Apps	Goals
Japan			League		Emperor's Cup		J.League Cup		Total	
2000	Montedio Yamagata	J2 League	15	1			0	0	15	1
Total			15	1	0	0	0	0	15	1
