= Walter (footballer, born 1968) =

Brazilian footballer

Personal information
- Full name: Walter Henrique de Oliveira
- Date of birth: October 21, 1968 (age 58)
- Place of birth: Brazil
- Height: 1.80 m (5 ft 11 in)
- Position: Midfielder

Senior career*
Years	Team	Apps	(Gls)
1993–1994	Júbilo Iwata	15	(0)
1995–1997	Honda	67	(5)
1998	Consadole Sapporo	21	(3)
1999	Montedio Yamagata	30	(3)
- * Club domestic league appearances and goals

Walter Henrique de Oliveira (born October 21, 1968) is a former Brazilian football player.

== Club statistics ==
Club performance			League		Cup		League Cup		Total	
Season	Club	League	Apps	Goals	Apps	Goals	Apps	Goals	Apps	Goals
Japan			League		Emperor's Cup		J.League Cup		Total	
1993	Yamaha Motors	Football League	15	0	1	0	4	0	20	0
1994	Júbilo Iwata	J1 League	0	0	0	0	0	0	0	0
1995	Honda	Football League	23	1	1	0	—		24	1
1996	Honda	Football League	20	2	2	1	—		22	3
1997	Honda	Football League	24	2	3	0	—		27	2
1998	Consadole Sapporo	J1 League	21	3	0	0	1	0	22	3
1999	Montedio Yamagata	J2 League	30	3	0	0	5	0	35	3
Total			133	11	12	1	5	0	150	12
