= Fukuyo Nakamori =

Japanese politician (born 1949)

- 中森 福代

Member of the House of Representatives
- In office 11 September 2005 – 8 May 2009
- Preceded by: Multi-member district
- Succeeded by: Matsuo Ōtaka
- Constituency: Northern Kanto PR

Member of the Saitama Prefectural Assembly
- In office 2001–2005

Personal details
- Born: 28 October 1949 (age 76) Arakawa, Tokyo, Japan
- Party: Liberal Democratic

Fukuyo Nakamori (中森 福代, Nakamori Fukuyo; born 28 October 1949) is a Japanese politician serving in the House of Representatives in the Diet (national legislature) as a member of the Liberal Democratic Party. A native of Arakawa, Tokyo and high school graduate she was elected to the Diet for the first time in September 2005 after unsuccessfully running for mayor of Saitama, Saitama in May 2005.
