= Momodu Mutairu =

Nigerian footballer

Personal information
- Full name: Momodu Mutairu
- Date of birth: September 2, 1976 (age 50)
- Place of birth: Nigeria
- Height: 1.77 m (5 ft 9 1/2 in)
- Position: Forward

Senior career*
Years	Team	Apps	(Gls)
1996–1998	Kawasaki Frontale		
1999	Montedio Yamagata	22	(6)

International career
1995	Nigeria	2	(0)
- * Club domestic league appearances and goals

Momodu Mutairu (born September 2, 1976) is a former Nigerian football player.

== Career statistics ==
Appearances and goals by club, season and competition
Club	Season	League			Emperor's Cup		J.League Cup		Total	
Club	Season	Division	Apps	Goals	Apps	Goals	Apps	Goals	Apps	Goals
Fujitsu	1996	Football League								
Kawasaki Frontale	1997	Football League								
Kawasaki Frontale	1998	Football League	6	3			1	0	7	3
Montedio Yamagata	1999	J2 League	22	6			1	0	23	6
Career total			28	9	0	0	2	0	30	9

== National team statistics ==
Nigeria national team
Year	Apps	Goals
1995	2	0
Total	2	0
