= Edwin Ifeanyi =

Cameroonian footballer (born 1972)

Personal information
- Full name: Edwin Ifeanyi
- Date of birth: 28 April 1972 (age 54)
- Place of birth: Cameroon
- Height: 1.78 m (5 ft 10 in)
- Position: Midfielder

Senior career*
Years	Team	Apps	(Gls)
1995–1997	Tokyo Gas	72	(16)
1998	Verdy Kawasaki	2	(0)
1999	Omiya Ardija	10	(0)
1999	Oita Trinita	18	(1)
2000	Montedio Yamagata	32	(3)

International career
1992–1994	Cameroon	2	(0)
- * Club domestic league appearances and goals

Edwin Ifeanyi (born April 28, 1972) is a former Cameroonian football player.

== Club statistics ==
Club performance			League		Cup		League Cup		Total	
Season	Club	League	Apps	Goals	Apps	Goals	Apps	Goals	Apps	Goals
Japan			League		Emperor's Cup		J.League Cup		Total	
1995	Tokyo Gas	Football League	15	1	0	0	-		15	1
1996	Tokyo Gas	Football League	29	7	3	2	-		32	9
1997	Tokyo Gas	Football League	28	8	5	1	-		33	9
1998	Verdy Kawasaki	J1 League	2	0	0	0	3	0	5	0
1999	Omiya Ardija	J2 League	10	0	0	0	2	0	12	0
1999	Oita Trinita	J2 League	18	1	0	0	0	0	18	1
2000	Montedio Yamagata	J2 League	32	3	1	3	0	0	33	6
Total			134	20	9	6	5	0	148	26

== National team statistics ==
Cameroon national team
Year	Apps	Goals
1992	1	0
1993	0	0
1994	1	0
Total	2	0
