= Alan Dotti =

Brazilian footballer and manager (born 1977)

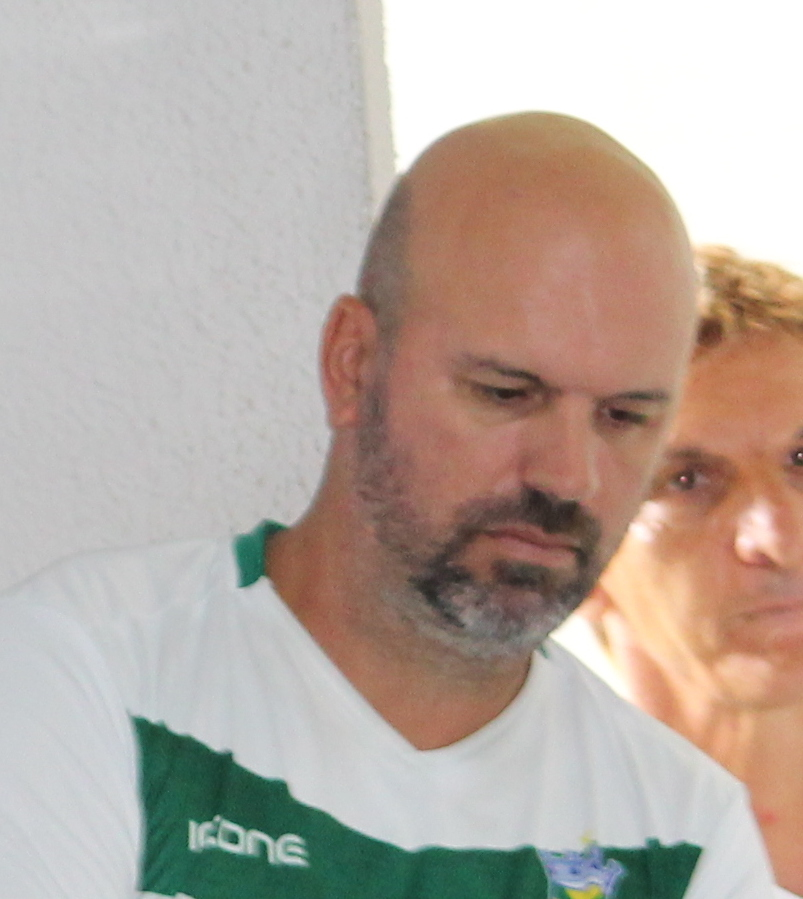
- Dotti in 2020

Personal information
- Full name: Alan David Dotti
- Date of birth: 19 March 1977 (age 49)
- Place of birth: São Paulo, Brazil
- Height: 1.90 m (6 ft 3 in)
- Position: Centre-back

Youth career
- Votuporanguense
- Junventus-SP
- Corinthians

Senior career*
Years	Team	Apps	(Gls)
1998	Rio Claro		
1999	Montedio Yamagata	7	(0)
2001	Inter de Limeira	0	(0)
2002–2003	Comercial-SP		
2003	União Rondonópolis		
2004	Juventude	0	(0)
2004	Santo André		
2005–2006	Extrema		

Managerial career
- 2010–2013: Santo André U20
- 2013: Santo André (interim)
- 2013: ASA (assistant)
- 2014: Cuiabá (assistant)
- 2014–2016: Confiança (assistant)
- 2016: ASA (assistant)
- 2016: Confiança (assistant)
- 2017–2018: Oeste U20
- 2018: Sampaio Corrêa (assistant)
- 2019: ASA
- 2019: Portuguesa (assistant)
- 2019: Portuguesa (interim)
- 2019: Sergipe (assistant)
- 2020: Santo André (assistant)
- 2020: Ferroviária (assistant)
- 2021: Santo André (assistant)
- 2021: Santo André (interim)
- 2021: São Bento (assistant)
- 2021: São Bento (interim)
- 2022–2024: Portuguesa U20
- 2024: Portuguesa
- 2025: Água Santa (assistant)
- 2025: Lagarto
- 2025: Água Santa
- 2026: São Bento
- 2026: Metropolitano
- * Club domestic league appearances and goals

Alan David Dotti (born 19 March 1977) is a Brazilian football coach and former player who played as a central defender.

== Playing career ==
After playing with the youth sides of Votuporanguense, Junventus-SP and Corinthians, Dotti made his senior debut with Rio Claro in 1998 before moving to Japan with Montedio Yamagata in the following year. He returned to his home country in 2001, with Inter de Limeira.

Dotti subsequently represented Comercial-SP and União Rondonópolis before signing for Juventude for the 2004 season, but was mainly used with the B-team. He then played for Santo André, before retiring with Extrema in 2006.

== Coaching career ==
After retiring, Dotti worked as a youth coach at Santo André before becoming an interim coach of the main squad in February 2013. He subsequently worked as an assistant at ASA, Cuiabá, Confiança (two stints) and back at ASA before becoming the under-20 coach of Oeste.

In July 2018, Dotti joined was named in Paulo Roberto Santos' staff at Sampaio Corrêa, as his assistant. On 20 November, he returned to ASA after being named head coach for the upcoming season, but resigned on 24 January 2019, after just one official match.

Dotti rejoined Santos' staff in February 2019 at Portuguesa, being the interim head coach in their first match as Santos was not registered on time. On 15 May, he joined Betinho's staff at Sergipe, but left the club five days later after accepting an offer from Inter de Limeira, which later also did not materialize.

Dotti continued to work in Santos' staff in the following years, at Santo André (two stints), Ferroviária and São Bento; he was also an interim head coach at Ramalhão in 2021, as Santos was sidelined due to the COVID-19, and at Bentão due to Santos' suspension.

Dotti left São Bento on 3 October 2021, and returned to Lusa on 19 November, now as head coach of the under-20 team. He led the club to the semifinals of the Campeonato Paulista Sub-20 in 2022 after 12 years.

On 17 April 2024, Dotti was confirmed as head coach of Portuguesa's first team for the year's Copa Paulista. He reached the semifinals of the competition, before departing by mutual consent on 30 November.

On 24 March 2025, after working as an assistant of Pintado at Água Santa, Dotti was named head coach of Lagarto. He left the club on 1 July, and returned to Água Santa the following day, now as head coach.

On 5 September 2025, after one win in his five matches in charge, Dotti was sacked by Netuno.

== Career statistics ==
=== Club ===
Appearances and goals by club, season and competition
Club	Season	League			National cup (Note: Includes Emperor's Cup)		League cup (Note: Includes J.League Cup)		Total	
Club	Season	Division	Apps	Goals	Apps	Goals	Apps	Goals	Apps	Goals
Montedio Yamagata	1999	J2 League	7	0					7	0
Career total			7	0	0	0	0	0	7	0

=== Managerial ===
As of 2 December 2024

Managerial record by team and tenure
Team	Nat.	From	To	Record								Ref
Team	Nat.	From	To	G	W	D	L	GF	GA	GD	Win %	Ref
Santo André (interim)	(Brazil)	12 February 2013	15 February 2013	1	0	1	0	0	0	+0	0.00	
ASA	(Brazil)	20 November 2018	24 January 2019	1	0	1	0	1	1	+0	0.00	
Portuguesa (interim)	(Brazil)	24 February 2019	24 February 2019	1	0	0	1	2	3	−1	0.00	
Santo André (interim) (Note: Interim head coach as Paulo Roberto Santos was sidelined due to COVID-19)	(Brazil)	15 March 2021	27 April 2021	4	0	1	3	0	5	−5	0.00	
São Bento (interim) (Note: Interim head coach as Paulo Roberto Santos was suspended)	(Brazil)	7 August 2021	28 August 2021	3	1	0	2	4	4	+0	33.33	
Portuguesa	(Brazil)	17 April 2024	30 November 2024	13	6	5	2	13	7	+6	46.15	
Água Santa (interim) (Note: Interim head coach as Pintado was suspended)	(Brazil)	9 February 2025	9 February 2025	1	0	1	0	1	1	+0	0.00	
Água Santa (interim)	(Brazil)	16 February 2025	16 February 2025	1	0	0	1	1	3	−2	0.00	
Lagarto	(Brazil)	24 March 2025	1 July 2025	10	4	2	4	12	14	−2	40.00	
Água Santa	(Brazil)	2 July 2025	5 September 2025	5	1	2	2	4	5	−1	20.00	
Career total				40	12	13	15	38	43	−5	30.00	—
