= 1996 Japan Football League =

Japan Football League
- Season: 1996
- Champions: Honda
- Promoted: Vissel Kobe
- Relegated: Tosu Futures; Cosmo Oil Yokkaichi (both were folded after the season)
- Matches: 240
- Goals: 825 (3.44 per match)

Statistics of Japan Football League in the 1996 season.

== Overview ==
It was contested by 16 teams, and Honda won the championship. However, citing continuing corporate ownership, they were refused promotion by the J.League, who took in the runner-up, Vissel Kobe, instead.

Newly promoted before the season were Nippon Denso, later known as FC Kariya, and Oita Trinity, later known as Oita Trinita.

== Clubs ==
The following sixteen clubs participated in Japan Football League Division 1 during the 1996 season.

- Brummell Sendai
- Consadole Sapporo
- Cosmo Oil Yokkaichi
- Denso
- Fujitsu Kawasaki
- Fukushima
- Honda
- Montedio Yamagata
- NTT Kanto
- Oita Trinity
- Otsuka Pharmaceutical
- Seino Transportation
- Tokyo Gas
- Tosu Futures
- Ventforet Kofu
- Vissel Kobe

=== Personnel ===
Club	Head coach
Brummell Sendai	(Japan) Choei Sato
Consadole Sapporo	(Japan) Takeo Takahashi
Cosmo Oil Yokkaichi	(Japan) Yoshihiko Yamamoto
Denso	
Fujitsu Kawasaki	
Fukushima	
Honda	
Montedio Yamagata	(Japan) Nobuhiro Ishizaki
NTT Kanto	
Oita Trinity	(South Korea) Moon Jung-sik
Otsuka Pharmaceutical	(Brazil) Edinho
Seino Transportation	
Tokyo Gas	(Japan) Kiyoshi Okuma
Tosu Futures	(South Korea) Chang Woe-ryong
Ventforet Kofu	(Japan) Yuji Tsukada
Vissel Kobe	(Scotland) Stuart Baxter

=== Foreign players ===
Club	Player 1	Player 2	Player 3	Player 4	Player 5	Non-visa foreign	Former players
Brummell Sendai	(Brazil) Edmar	(Czech Republic) František Mysliveček	(Germany) Frank Ordenewitz	(Germany) Pierre Littbarski	(Germany) Reinhard Stumpf		
Consadole Sapporo	(Brazil) Pereira	(Czech Republic) Luboš Zákostelský	(Czech Republic) Pavel Řehák	(Uruguay) Raul Otero		(North Korea) Kim Jong-song (Peru) David Soria Yoshinari	(Brazil) Alcindo
Cosmo Oil Yokkaichi	(South Korea) Kim Byung-soo						
Denso							
Fujitsu Kawasaki	(Netherlands) André Paus	(Nigeria) Momodu Mutairu					
Fukushima	(South Korea) Gwak Kyung-keun						
Honda	(Brazil) Wagner Lopes	(Brazil) Walter					
Montedio Yamagata	(Brazil) Aldro	(Brazil) Angelo					
NTT Kanto							
Oita Trinity	(South Korea) Choi Dae-shik	(South Korea) Hwangbo Kwan	(South Korea) Lee Woo-young				(South Korea) Lee Young-jin
Otsuka Pharmaceutical	(Brazil) Almir						
Seino Transportation							
Tokyo Gas	(Brazil) Amaral	(Brazil) João Cavalo	(Brazil) Júnior	(Cameroon) Edwin Ifeanyi			
Tosu Futures	(Cameroon) Stephen Tataw	(Panama) Jorge Dely Valdés				(Peru) Edwin Uehara (Peru) Hector Takayama	
Ventforet Kofu	(Brazil) Baron	(Uruguay) Mario López					
Vissel Kobe	(Denmark) Michael Laudrup	(Scotland) Lee Baxter	(Sweden) Jan Jönsson	(Switzerland) Thomas Bickel	(Tunisia) Ziad Tlemçani	(South Korea) Cho Kwi-jae	

== League standings ==
Pos	Club	P	W	L	F	A	GD	Pts	Notes
1	Honda	30	25	5	83	35	48	75	**Champions** (Refused promotion)
2	**Vissel Kobe**	30	25	5	78	32	46	75	Promoted to J.League
3	Tokyo Gas	30	24	6	63	28	35	73	
4	**Tosu Futures**	30	20	10	68	43	25	62	Folded
5	**Consadole Sapporo**	30	20	10	60	43	17	62	
6	**Brummell Sendai**	30	18	12	67	52	15	56	
7	Otsuka Pharmaceutical	30	18	12	56	41	15	55	
8	Montedio Yamagata	30	16	14	45	49	-4	49	
9	Fujitsu Kawasaki	30	15	15	48	45	3	45	
10	Oita Trinity	30	13	17	42	52	-10	39	
11	Ventforet Kofu	30	11	19	50	56	-6	33	
12	Cosmo Oil Yokkaichi	30	11	19	31	49	-28	33	Folded
13	NTT Kanto	30	7	23	36	55	-19	23	
14	Fukushima	30	7	23	30	63	-33	22	
15	Denso	30	5	25	40	90	-50	16	
16	Seino Transportation	30	5	25	28	82	-54	15	

Updated to match(es) played in November 1996. Source:
Rules for classification: 1) points; 2) goal difference; 3) number of goals scored.

- Notes:
- Teams in **Bold** are the J.League associate members
- After the season Tosu Futures & Cosmo Oil Yokkaichi folded
