= David Soria Yoshinari =

Japanese Peruvian footballer (born 1977)

David Soria
Personal information
- Full name: David Soria Yoshinari
- Date of birth: September 18, 1977 (age 49)
- Place of birth: Lima, Peru
- Height: 1.73 m (5 ft 8 in)
- Position: Midfielder

Team information
- Current team: U. César Vallejo
- Number: 18

Senior career*
Years	Team	Apps	(Gls)
1996–1997	Consadole Sapporo	2	(0)
1998–1999	AELU		
2000–2003	Sporting Cristal	123	(19)
2004	Coronel Bolognesi	34	(8)
2005–2007	Sporting Cristal	86	(4)
2008–2009	U. César Vallejo	63	(5)
2010	Total Chalaco	14	(2)
2011	Sport Áncash		
2012	Deportivo Coopsol		
2013	Walter Ormeño		

International career
2000	Peru	5	(0)
- * Club domestic league appearances and goals

David Soria Yoshinari (吉成大, Yoshinari Dai) (born September 18, 1977, in Lima, Peru) is a Japanese Peruvian retired football player.

== International career ==
Soria made five appearances for the Peru national football team during 2000.
