= 1997 Japan Football League =

Japan Football League
- Season: 1997
- Champions: Consadole Sapporo; 1st JFL title 3rd D2 title
- Promoted: Consadole Sapporo
- Relegated: Fukushima; Seino Transportation (both were folded after the season)
- Matches: 240
- Goals: 765 (3.19 per match)

Statistics of Japan Football League in the 1997 season.

== Overview ==
It was contested by 16 teams, and Consadole Sapporo won the championship.

As a result of Cosmo Oil Yokkaichi's closure the previous year, Jatco and Mito HollyHock were promoted before the season.

== Clubs ==
The following sixteen clubs participated in Japan Football League Division 1 during the 1997 season.

- Brummell Sendai
- Consadole Sapporo
- Denso
- Fukushima
- Honda Motors
- Jatco
- Kawasaki Frontale
- Mito HollyHock
- Montedio Yamagata
- NTT Kanto
- Oita Trinity
- Otsuka FC Vortis Tokushima
- Sagan Tosu
- Seino Transportation
- Tokyo Gas
- Ventforet Kofu

=== Personnel ===
Club	Head coach
Brummell Sendai	(Slovenia) Branko Elsner
Consadole Sapporo	(Uruguay) Hugo Fernández
Denso	
Fukushima	
Honda Motors	(Japan) Kazuaki Nagasawa
Jatco	
Kawasaki Frontale	(Japan) Kazuo Saito
Mito HollyHock	(Japan) Yuji Nakano
Montedio Yamagata	(Japan) Nobuhiro Ishizaki
NTT Kanto	(Japan) Norio Sasaki
Oita Trinity	
Otsuka FC Vortis Tokushima	(Brazil) Edinho
Sagan Tosu	(Japan) Hiroshi Sowa
Seino Transportation	
Tokyo Gas	(Japan) Kiyoshi Okuma
Ventforet Kofu	(Japan) Yuji Tsukada

=== Foreign players ===
Club	Player 1	Player 2	Player 3	Non-visa foreign	Former players
Brummell Sendai	(Federal Republic of Yugoslavia) Slobodan Dubajić	(Germany) Gerhard Schmidt	(Slovenia) Peter Binkovski		(Germany) Pierre Littbarski (Slovenia) Ante Šimundža
Consadole Sapporo	(Argentina) Hugo Maradona	(Brazil) Pereira	(Panama) Jorge Dely Valdés	(Netherlands) Dido Havenaar (Peru) David Soria Yoshinari	
Denso					
Fukushima	(South Korea) Gwak Kyung-keun				
Honda Motors	(Brazil) Marcus Vinícius	(Brazil) Walter		(Brazil) Sandro	
Jatco					
Kawasaki Frontale	(Brazil) Betinho	(Brazil) Rafael Scheidt	(Nigeria) Momodu Mutairu		
Mito HollyHock					
Montedio Yamagata	(Brazil) Angelo	(Brazil) Marquinho	(Brazil) Sidiclei		(Brazil) Aldro
NTT Kanto					
Oita Trinity	(South Korea) Choi Dae-shik	(South Korea) Kim Byung-soo	(South Korea) Lee Woo-young		
Otsuka FC Vortis Tokushima					
Sagan Tosu	(Uruguay) Mario López			(South Korea) Pak Yong-ho	
Seino Transportation					
Tokyo Gas	(Brazil) Amaral	(Cameroon) Edwin Ifeanyi			
Ventforet Kofu					

== League standings ==
Pos	Team	Pld	W	OTW	PKW	L	GF	GA	GD	Pts	Promotion
1	Consadole Sapporo (C, P)	30	24	2	0	4	77	26	+51	76	Promoted to 1998 J.League
2	Tokyo Gas	30	21	2	1	6	70	30	+40	68	
3	Kawasaki Frontale	30	21	2	0	7	87	36	+51	67	
4	Honda Motors	30	20	2	1	7	60	37	+23	65	
5	Montedio Yamagata	30	18	1	0	11	57	36	+21	56	
6	Ventforet Kofu	30	15	3	1	11	59	41	+18	52	
7	Otsuka FC Vortis Tokushima	30	13	1	0	16	50	45	+5	41	
8	Brummell Sendai	30	12	1	2	15	37	43	−6	40	
9	NTT Kanto	30	11	3	0	16	48	49	−1	39	
10	Fukushima	30	12	1	0	17	48	59	−11	38	Folded (Note: After the season, Fukushima has folded due to financial difficulties.)
11	Sagan Tosu	30	12	1	0	17	38	54	−16	38	
12	Oita Trinity	30	7	4	0	19	42	64	−22	29	
13	Denso	30	7	2	2	19	29	49	−20	27	
14	Seino Transportation	30	5	0	0	25	24	67	−43	15	Folded (Note: Seino Transportation were disbanded by parent company after the season.)
15	Jatco	30	2	1	3	24	25	70	−45	11	
16	Mito HollyHock	30	3	0	1	26	24	69	−45	10	

Updated to match(es) played on November 1997. Source: Montedio Yamagata website
Rules for classification: 1) points; 2) goal difference; 3) number of goals scored.
(C) Champion; (P) Promoted
Notes:

Home \ Away	BRU	CON	DEN	FRO	FFC	HOL	HON	JAT	MON	NTK	OVT	SAG	SET	TGA	TRI	VEN
Brummell Sendai		0–1	1–0	2–3	0–1	1–0	1–1^{PK 3–4}	2–0	1–3	0–3	2–0	2–0	2–1	3–1	3–0	2–0
Consadole Sapporo	3–0		1–0	4–3^{OT}	2–0	6–1	1–0	1–0	3–0	1–0	5–1	4–0	3–0	2–1	2–1	3–0
Denso	1–0^{OT}	1–6		1–4	0–1	1–0	0–3	4–3	2–1	0–0^{PK 4–3}	1–5	1–3	2–0	1–3	3–3^{PK 5–4}	0–2
Kawasaki Frontale	3–0	3–4^{OT}	1–0		3–1	1–0	1–3	4–0	2–1	2–1	1–0	5–0	3–0	3–0	4–0	2–3
Fukushima	1–0	2–5	1–0	2–6		1–2	0–1	3–1	2–1	2–3	3–1	2–0	0–1	1–2	4–3^{OT}	2–2^{PK 3–4}
Mito HollyHock	1–2	0–2	0–1	2–1	0–2		0–3	0–0^{PK 5–6}	0–4	2–3	1–6	0–2	2–0	1–3	1–2	1–5
Honda Motors	4–0	2–1	2–1	2–4	5–0	3–2		1–5	3–0	1–0	2–0	2–1	1–2	3–2	4–0	2–1
Jatco	2–2^{PK 1–4}	0–3	0–1	0–6	0–1	1–0^{OT}	1–2		0–3	0–3	1–3	1–1^{PK 4–1}	0–1	1–4	0–1^{OT}	0–3
Montedio Yamagata	3–1	4–1	2–1	1–2^{OT}	2–1	2–0	1–0^{OT}	2–1		1–2^{OT}	2–1	2–1	3–0	1–0	1–2	2–3
NTT Kanto	0–3	3–5	1–2^{OT}	0–1	2–0	3–2	0–1	3–2	0–2		2–1^{OT}	2–0	2–1	0–3	3–2^{OT}	0–1
Otsuka FC Vortis Tokushima	1–0	0–2	1–0^{OT}	0–1^{OT}	3–0	2–1	1–2	5–1	2–1	1–5		1–1^{PK 3–5}	3–0	1–2	1–2^{OT}	3–0
Sagan Tosu	2–1	0–2	0–0^{PK 3–1}	0–3	4–1	1–1^{PK 3–5}	3–0	1–2	0–1	4–1	0–1		2–1^{OT}	0–2	1–0	2–0
Seino Transportation	1–3	1–2	0–3	1–5	0–2	4–1	2–3^{OT}	1–1^{PK 2–4}	1–4	1–2	0–3	2–1		1–2	1–2	1–4
Tokyo Gas	5–0	0–0^{PK 6–5}	2–1	4–3^{OT}	1–0	1–0	5–0	4–1	2–1	3–1	1–0	5–2	2–0		3–2^{OT}	3–0
Oita Trinity	1–2^{OT}	1–2	1–0	1–7	1–2	4–2	1–2	2–1^{OT}	0–1	2–1	2–3	2–3^{OT}	1–0^{OT}	0–4		2–0
Ventforet Kofu	1–1^{PK 3–4}	2–0	2–1^{OT}	3–0	3–0	2–1^{OT}	1–2^{OT}	3–0	2–5	3–2	4–0	2–3^{OT}	3–0	1–0^{OT}	3–1	

Updated to match(es) played on November 1997. Source: Montedio Yamagata website
Legend: Blue = home team win; Yellow = draw; Red = away team win.

== Promotion and relegation ==
Because Fukushima and Seino Transportation were disbanded, no relegation has occurred. At the end of the season, the winner and runner-up of Regional League promotion series, Sony Sendai and Albirex Niigata were promoted automatically.
