= Hiroshi Sowa =

Japanese footballer and manager

Hiroshi Sowa 楚輪 博
Personal information
- Full name: Hiroshi Sowa
- Date of birth: May 1, 1956 (age 70)
- Place of birth: Hiroshima, Hiroshima, Japan
- Height: 1.74 m (5 ft 8 1/2 in)
- Position: Midfielder

Youth career
- 1972–1974: Hiroshima Technical High School
- 1975–1978: Hosei University

Senior career*
Years	Team	Apps	(Gls)
1979–1990	Yammer Diesel	191	(13)
Total		191	(13)

Managerial career
- 1996: Cerezo Osaka
- 1997–1999: Sagan Tosu
- 2004–2010: Kataller Toyama
Medal record
Yanmar Diesel
Winner	Japan Soccer League	1980
Winner	JSL Cup	1983
Winner	JSL Cup	1984
Runner-up	JSL Cup	1982
Runner-up	Emperor's Cup	1983
- * Club domestic league appearances and goals

Hiroshi Sowa (楚輪 博, Sowa Hiroshi; born May 1, 1956) is a former Japanese football player and manager.

== Playing career ==
Sowa was born in Hiroshima on May 1, 1956. After graduating from Hosei University, he played for Yammer Diesel (later Cerezo Osaka) from 1979 to 1990. He played 191 games and scored 13 goals, He was also selected Best Eleven in 1981 and 1982.

== Coaching career ==
After retirement, Sowa started coaching career at Cerezo Osaka in 1994. In 1996, he became a manager. In 1997, he moved to Japan Football League club Sagan Tosu and served as a manager. The club joined new league J2 League in 1999. He managed the club until 1999. In 2004, he signed with Japan Football League club YKK AP (later Kataller Toyama). In 2008, the club won the 3rd place and was promoted to J2 from 2009. However in 2010 season, the club results were bad and he was sacked in September when the club at the 18th place of 19 clubs.

== Managerial statistics ==
Team	From	To	Record				
Team	From	To	G	W	D	L	Win %
Cerezo Osaka	1996	1996	15	5	0	10	33.33
Sagan Tosu	1999	1999	36	12	2	22	33.33
Kataller Toyama	2009	2010	78	21	18	39	26.92
Total			129	38	20	71	29.46
