= Yamagata Municipal Stadium =

Athletic stadium in Yamagata Japan

Coordinates: 38°15′51″N 140°20′44″E

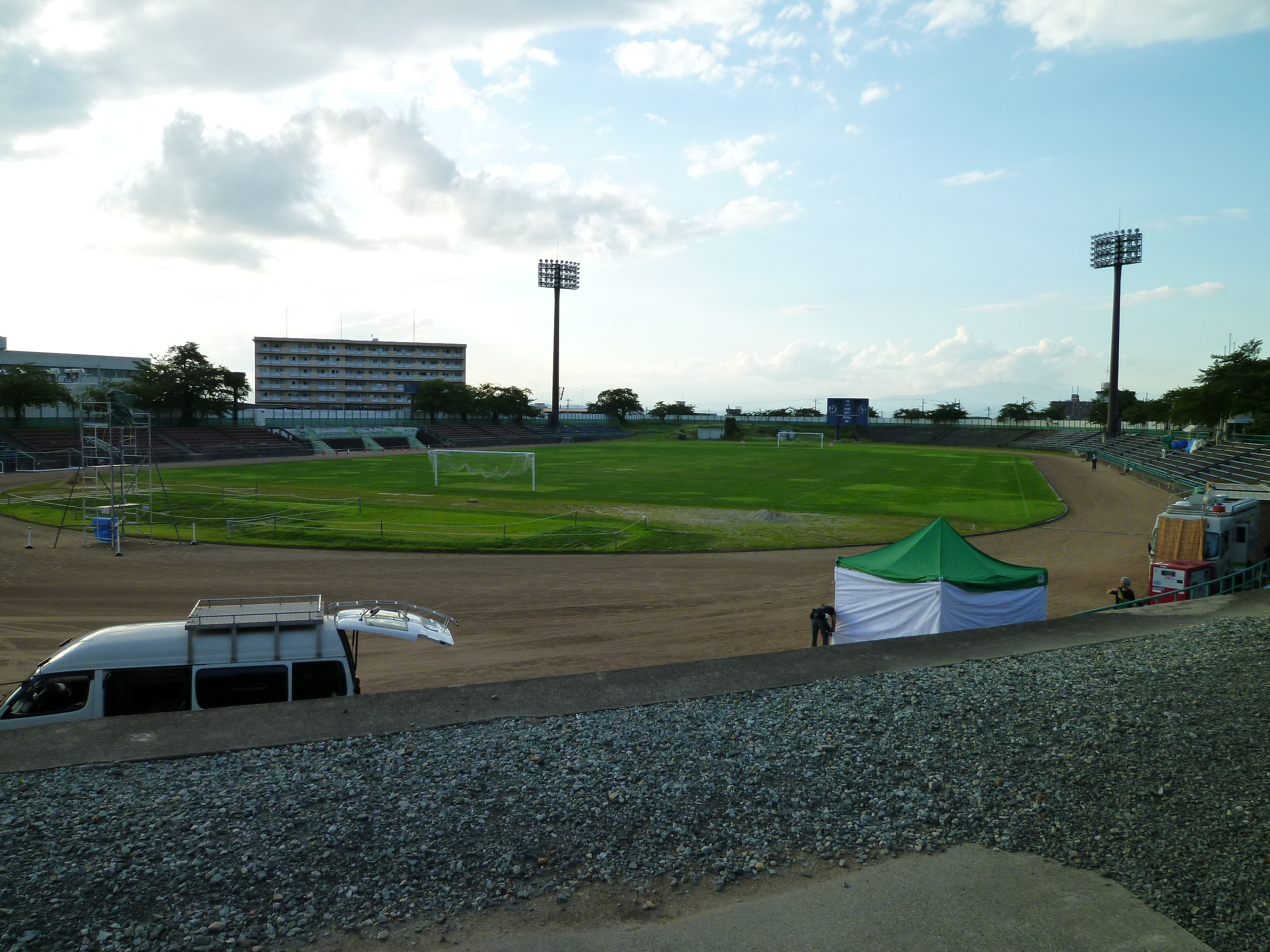
- Interactive map of Yamagata Municipal Stadium
- Location: Yamagata, Yamagata, Japan
- Owner: Yamagata City
- Capacity: 9,000
- Surface: grass
- Field size: 108 m x 71 m

Construction
- Opened: 1979
- Renovated: 1986, 1994
- Closed: 2013

Tenant
- Montedio Yamagata (1994-2001)

Yamagata City Playing Field
- 山形市球技場
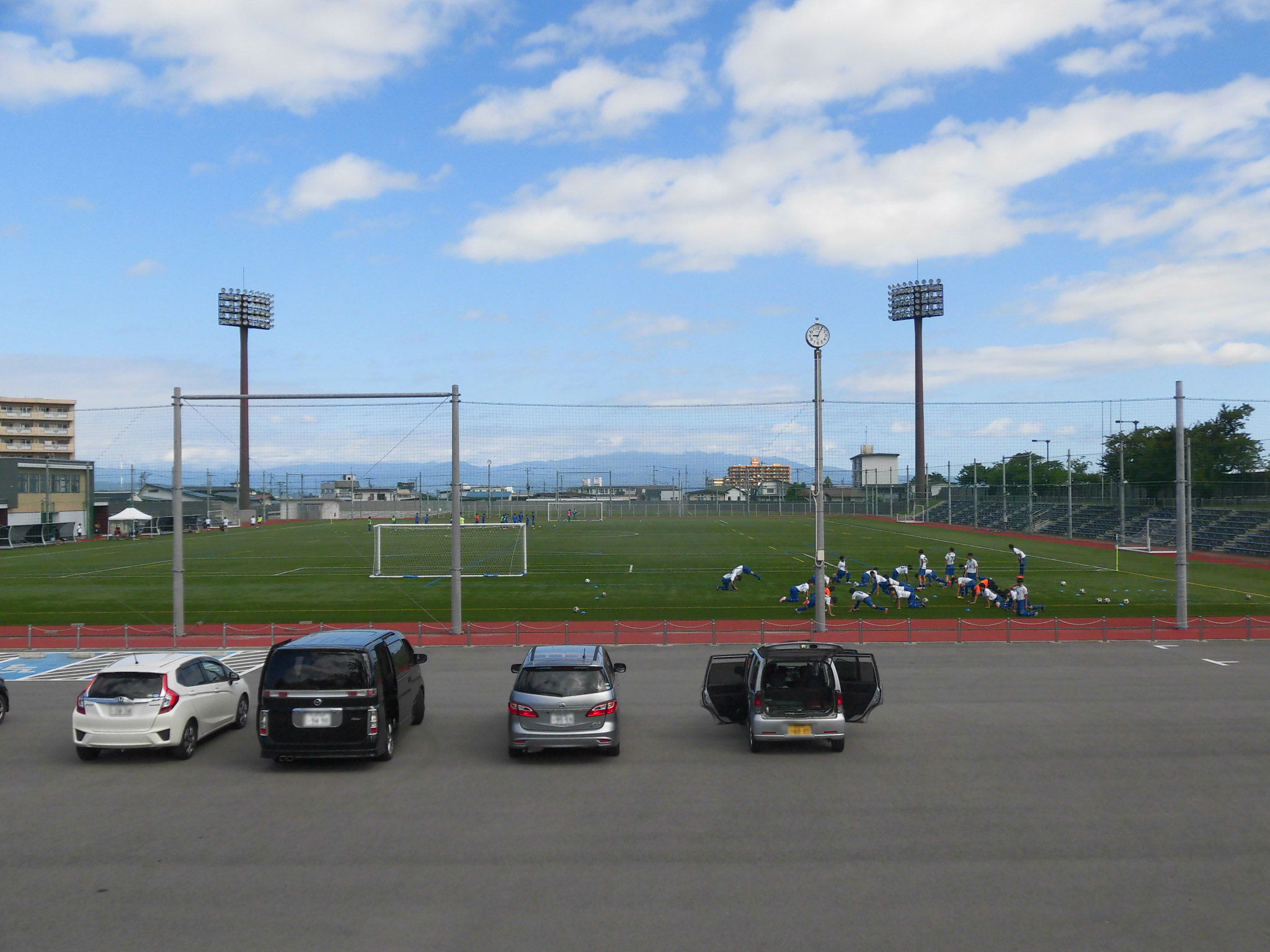
- Interactive map of Yamagata City Playing Field
- Owner: City of Yamagata
- Capacity: 1,600
- Surface: Artificial turf

Construction
- Opened: 1 April 2015

Yamagata Municipal Stadium (山形市陸上競技場) was an athletic stadium located in the city of Yamagata, Yamagata Prefecture Japan.

The stadium was home to the NEC Yamagata soccer team (now Montedio Yamagata) of the Japan Football League until 1995, when the team was relocated to ND Soft Stadium Yamagata. After renovation, the stadium was a multi-purpose venue with a cinder track and a central pitch of 108 x 71 meters. It was one of the home stadium of football club Montedio Yamagata from 1999 to 2001.
