= Kiyoshi Okuma =

Japanese footballer and manager

Kiyoshi Okuma 大熊 清
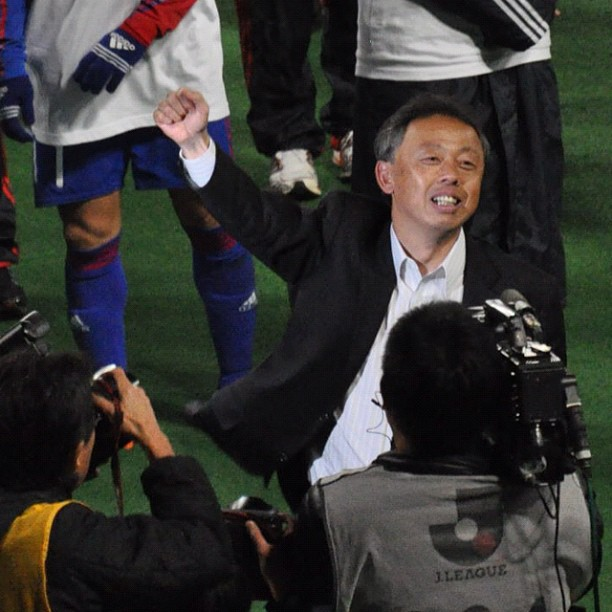

Personal information
- Full name: Kiyoshi Okuma
- Date of birth: June 21, 1964 (age 62)
- Place of birth: Saitama, Saitama, Japan
- Height: 1.78 m (5 ft 10 in)
- Position: Defender

Youth career
- 1980–1982: Saitama Urawa Minami High School
- 1983–1986: Chuo University

Senior career*
Years	Team	Apps	(Gls)
1987–1992	Tokyo Gas		

Managerial career
- 1994–2001: FC Tokyo
- 2002–2005: Japan U-20
- 2010–2011: FC Tokyo
- 2014: Omiya Ardija
- 2015–2016: Cerezo Osaka
- * Club domestic league appearances and goals

Kiyoshi Okuma (大熊 清, Okuma Kiyoshi; born June 21, 1964) is a former Japanese football player and manager. His younger brother Yuji Okuma is also a former footballer.

== Playing career ==
Okuma was born in Saitama on June 21, 1964. After graduating from Chuo University, he joined Tokyo Gas in 1987. He retired in 1992.

== Coaching career ==
After retirement, Okuma became a coach at Tokyo Gas (later FC Tokyo) from 1994. In 1994, he managed as caretaker in 1994 Emperor's Cup. In 1995, he became a manager and managed until 2001. In 2002, he became a manager Japan U-20 national team. He managed at the 2003 and 2005 World Youth Championship. In July 2006, he became a coach for Japan national team under manager Ivica Osim and Takeshi Okada. After 2010 World Cup, he resigned. In September 2010, he returned to FC Tokyo and managed until 2011. From 2014, he managed Omiya Ardija (2014) and Cerezo Osaka (2015-2016).

== Managerial statistics ==
Team	From	To	Record				
Team	From	To	G	W	D	L	Win %
FC Tokyo	1999	2001	96	49	9	38	51.04
FC Tokyo	2010	2011	49	27	11	11	55.10
Omiya Ardija	2014	2014	22	3	7	12	13.64
Cerezo Osaka	2015	2016	43	24	9	10	55.81
Total			210	103	36	71	49.05

== Personal honors ==
As manager

- AFC Coach of the Month - March 2000

== Team honors ==
As manager

- Japan Football League - 1998
- J2 League - 2011
- Emperor's Cup - 2011
