= Tsuruoka Stadium =

Athletic stadium in Tsuruoka, Yamagata, Japan

Coordinates: 38°42′49″N 139°48′54″E

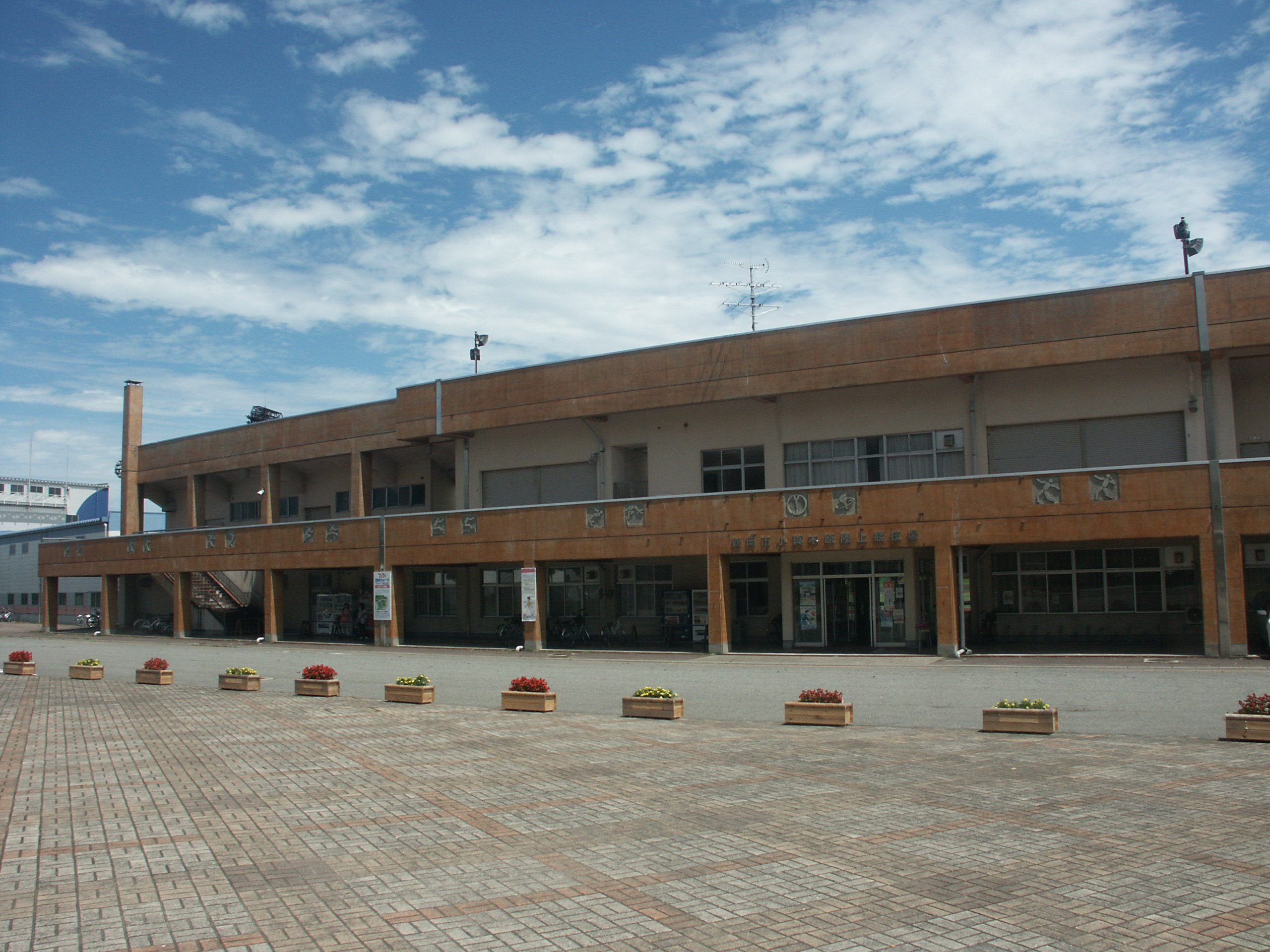

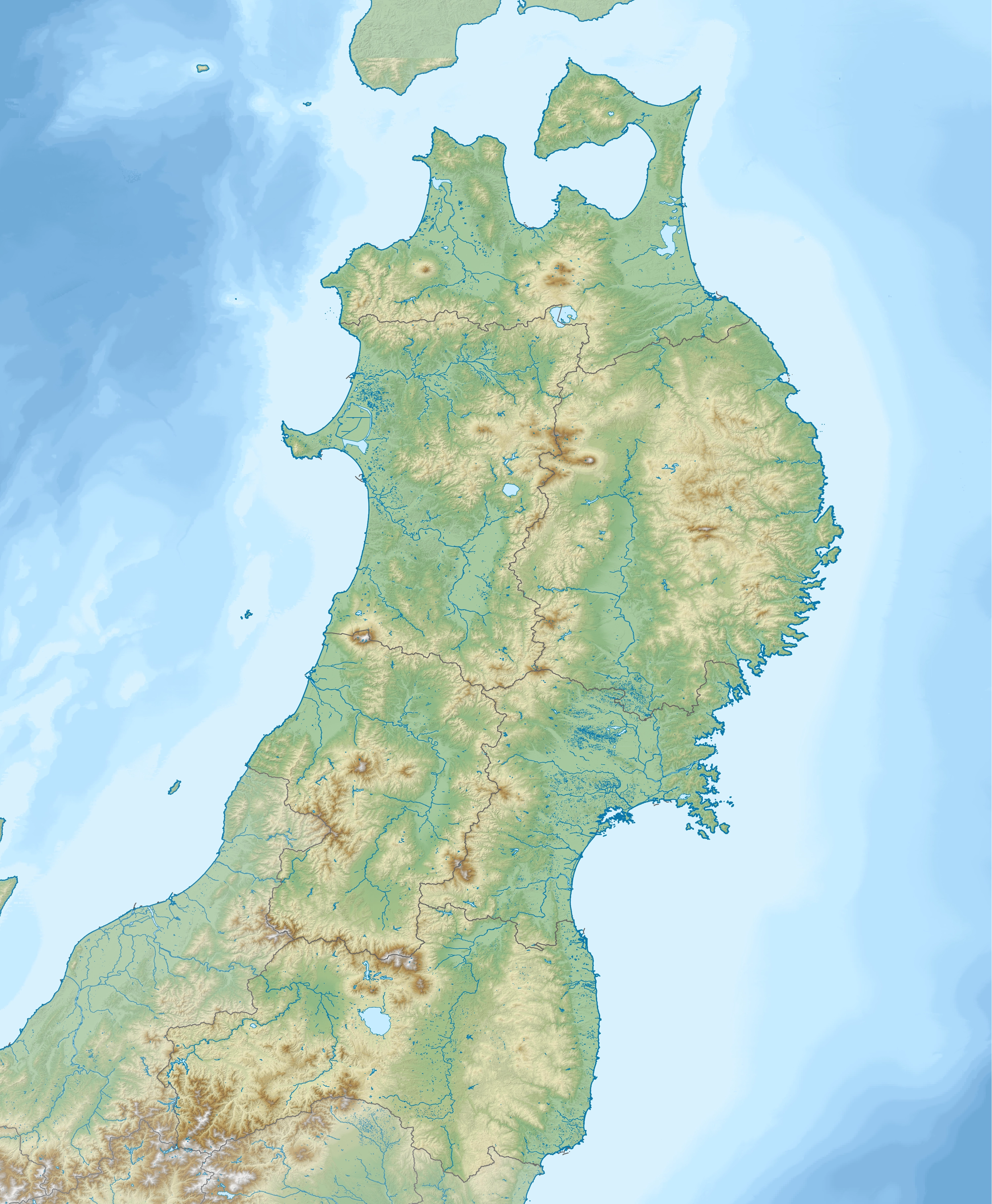
- Location within Yamagata Prefecture Location within Tohoku, Japan Location within Japan
- Interactive map of Tsuruoka Stadium
- Location: Tsuruoka, Yamagata, Japan
- Owner: Tsuruoka City
- Capacity: 7,000

Construction
- Opened: 1990

Tenants
- NEC Yamagata SC; Montedio Yamagata; Oyama SC; Mikawa SC

Tsuruoka Stadium (鶴岡市小真木原陸上競技場) is an athletic stadium in Tsuruoka, Yamagata, Japan. It is a part of Komagihara Park, and served as a home venue for NEC Yamagata SC.

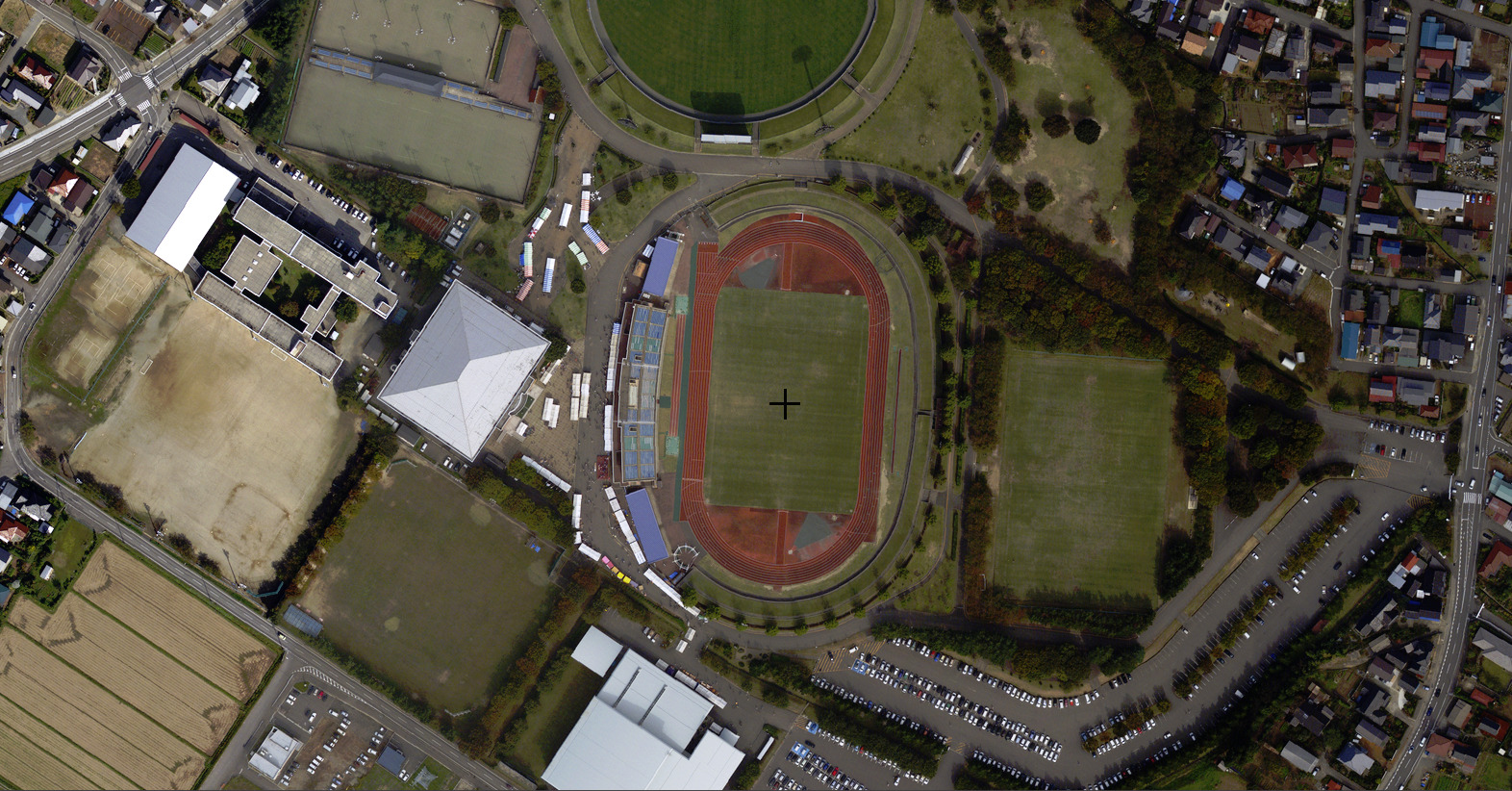
Satellite view in 2013
