= ND Soft Stadium Yamagata =

Sports venue in Tendo, Yamagata Prefecture, Japan

- ND suta, NDA suta

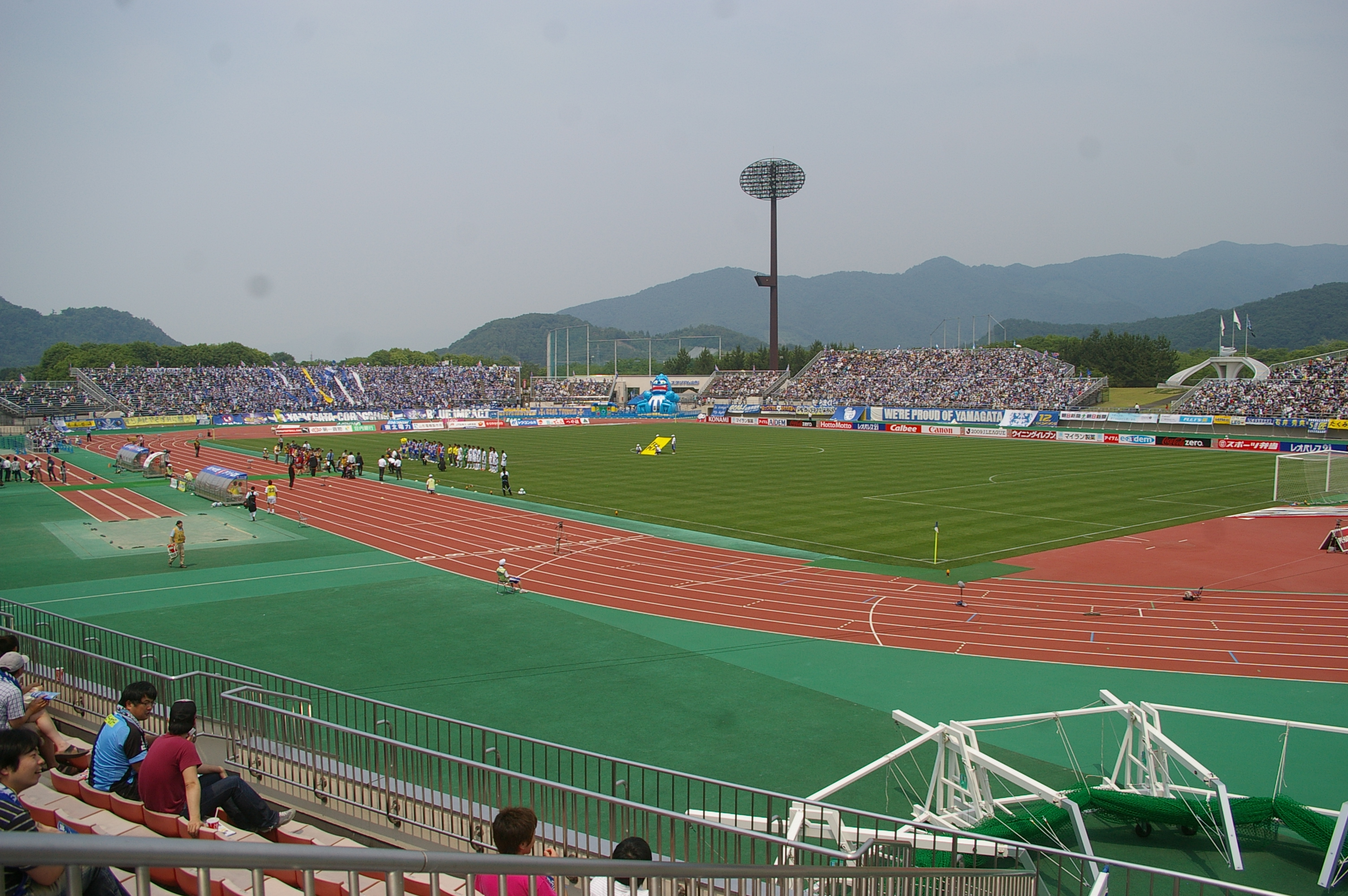

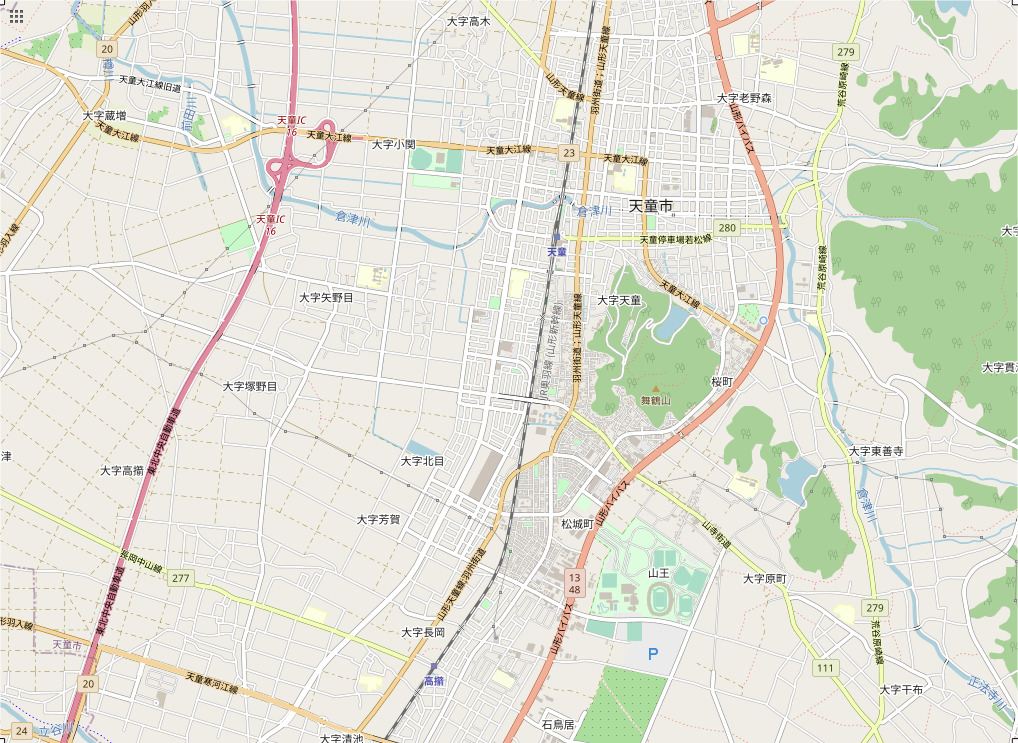
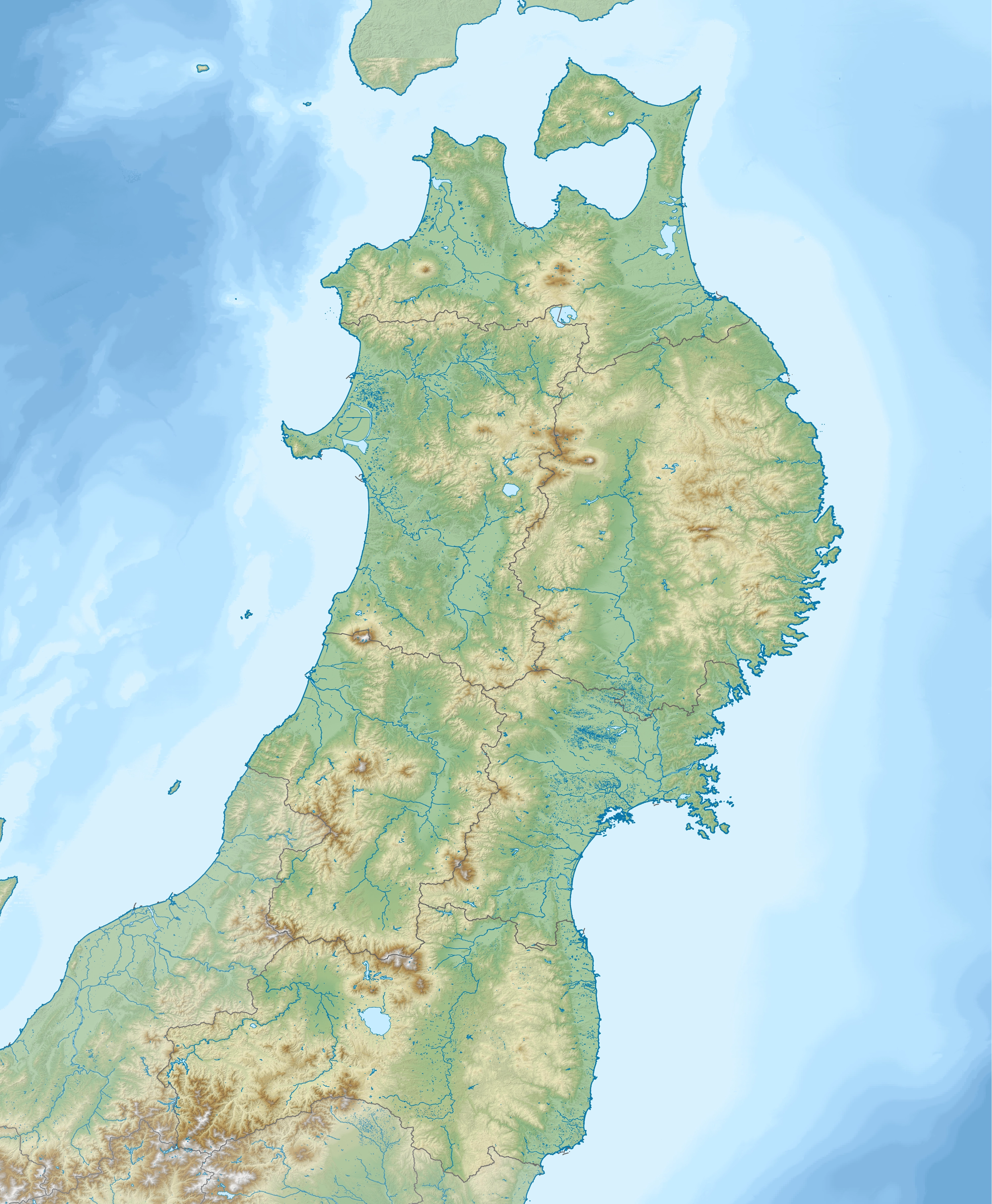
- Location within Tendo, Yamagata Location within Yamagata Prefecture Location within Tohoku, Japan Location within Japan
- Interactive map of ND Soft Stadium Yamagata
- Former names: Yamagata Park Stadium (1991–2007)
- Location: Tendō, Yamagata, Japan
- Coordinates: 38°20′11.61″N 140°22′42.81″E
- Owner: Yamagata Prefecture
- Operator: Montedio Yamagata
- Capacity: 21,292
- Surface: Grass
- Scoreboard: Panasonic display 8.0×14.4m(115.2 m^{2})
- Field size: 107 x 70 m
- Public transit: Japan Railways Tendo Minami Station
- Parking: 6,000 spaces

Construction
- Opened: June 1991
- Expanded: 1995

Tenant
- Montedio Yamagata

ND Soft Stadium Yamagata (NDソフトスタジアム山形) is a multi-purpose stadium in the Yamagata Prefectural Sports Park in Tendo, Yamagata Prefecture. The facility is owned by Yamagata Prefecture and operated and managed by Montedio Yamagata Co., Ltd. as the designated manager. The stadium holds 21,292 people and was built in 1991.

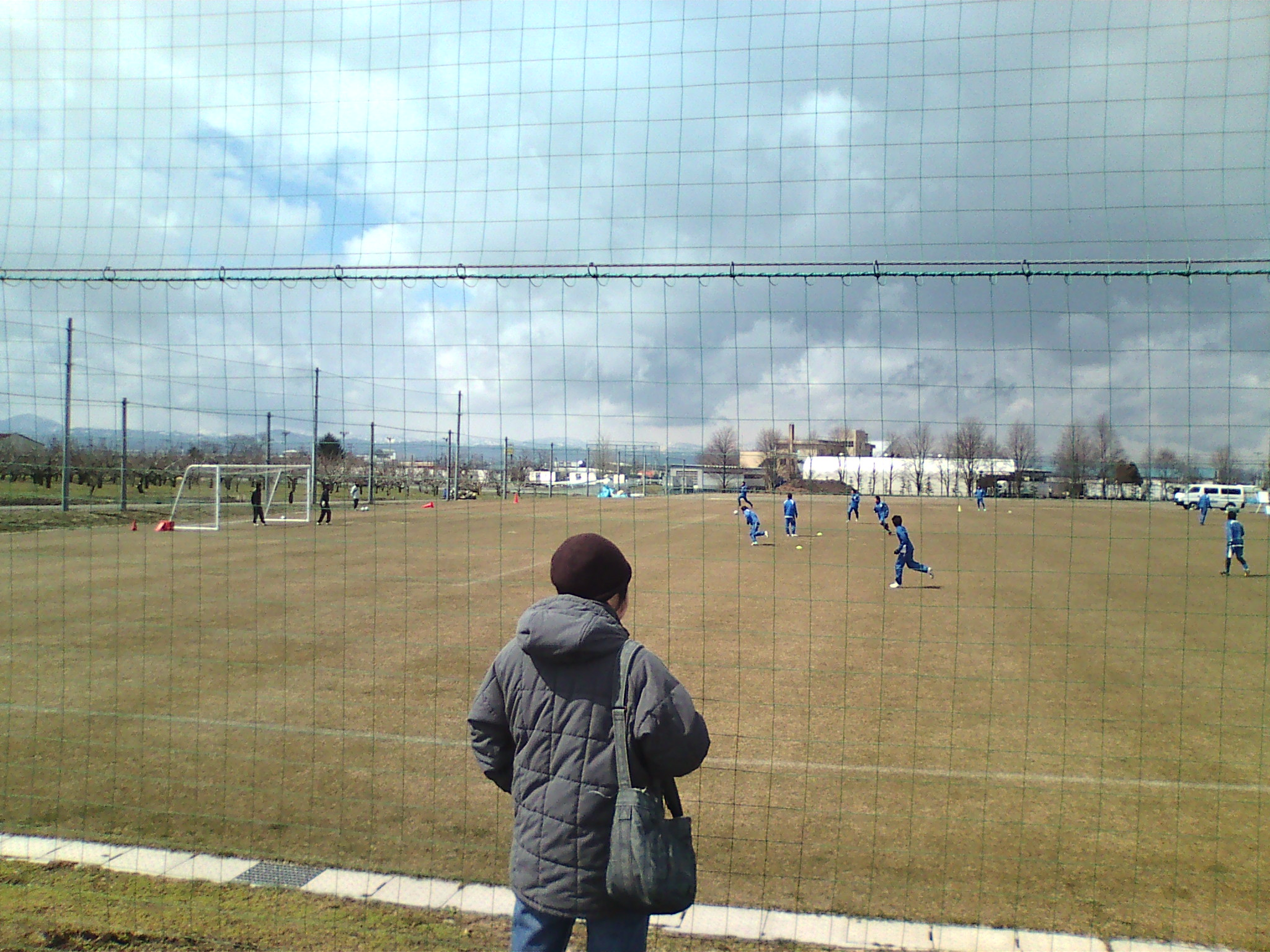
Practice ground at Yamagata Prefecture Sports Park

== Location map ==
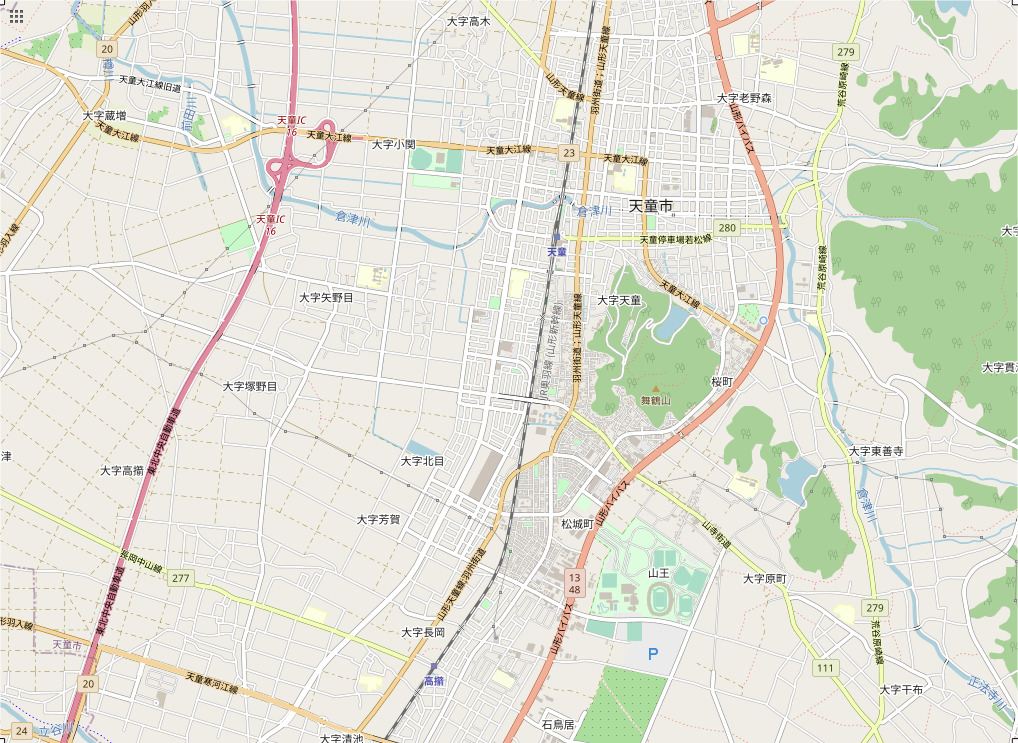
ND Soft Stadium (Tendo, Yamagata)
