= 2001 Consadole Sapporo season =

Consadole Sapporo
2001 season
- Manager: Takeshi Okada
- Stadium: Sapporo Dome
- J.League 1: 11th
- Emperor's Cup: 3rd Round
- J.League Cup: 1st Round
- Top goalscorer: Will (24)
Home colours	Away colours

Consadole Sapporo is a Japanese football club. Its 2001 season results are set out below.

== Competitions ==
Competitions	Position
J.League 1	11th / 16 clubs
Emperor's Cup	3rd round
J.League Cup	1st round

== Domestic results ==
=== J.League 1 ===
10 March 2001 1-1	Cerezo Osaka	1-2	Consadole Sapporo	Osaka Nagai Stadium
JST (UTC+09)

17 March 2001 1-2	Consadole Sapporo	2-1	Kashiwa Reysol	Kochi Haruno Athletic Stadium
JST (UTC+09)

31 March 2001 1-3	Sanfrecce Hiroshima	1-0	Consadole Sapporo	Hiroshima Big Arch
JST (UTC+09)

7 April 2001 1-4	Consadole Sapporo	2-0	Tokyo Verdy 1969	Muroran Irie Stadium
JST (UTC+09)

14 April 2001 1-5	Vissel Kobe	0-0 (GG) (a.e.t.)	Consadole Sapporo	Kobe Universiade Memorial Stadium
JST (UTC+09)

29 April 2001 1-6	Consadole Sapporo	1-0	Gamba Osaka	Hakodate Chiyogadai Stadium
JST (UTC+09)

3 May 2001 1-7	Shimizu S-Pulse	5-2	Consadole Sapporo	Nihondaira Sports Stadium
JST (UTC+09)

6 May 2001 1-8	FC Tokyo	2-1	Consadole Sapporo	Kagawa Marugame Stadium
JST (UTC+09)

12 May 2001 1-9	Consadole Sapporo	2-1	Kashima Antlers	Sapporo Atsubetsu Park Stadium
JST (UTC+09)

19 May 2001 1-10	Júbilo Iwata	2-1 (GG) (a.e.t.)	Consadole Sapporo	Júbilo Iwata Stadium
JST (UTC+09)

16 June 2001 1-11	Consadole Sapporo	2-2 (GG) (a.e.t.)	Nagoya Grampus Eight	Sapporo Atsubetsu Park Stadium
JST (UTC+09)

23 June 2001 1-12	Urawa Red Diamonds	2-0	Consadole Sapporo	Urawa Komaba Stadium
JST (UTC+09)

7 July 2001 1-13	Consadole Sapporo	2-3 (GG) (a.e.t.)	JEF United Ichihara	Sapporo Atsubetsu Park Stadium
JST (UTC+09)

14 July 2001 1-14	Avispa Fukuoka	0-2	Consadole Sapporo	Hakatanomori Football Stadium
JST (UTC+09)

21 July 2001 1-15	Consadole Sapporo	1-1 (GG) (a.e.t.)	Yokohama F. Marinos	Sapporo Dome
JST (UTC+09)

11 August 2001 2-1	Kashima Antlers	2-1	Consadole Sapporo	Kashima Soccer Stadium
JST (UTC+09)

18 August 2001 2-2	Consadole Sapporo	2-5	FC Tokyo	Sapporo Dome
JST (UTC+09)

25 August 2001 2-3	Yokohama F. Marinos	3-2 (GG) (a.e.t.)	Consadole Sapporo	International Stadium Yokohama
JST (UTC+09)

8 September 2001 2-4	Consadole Sapporo	3-4 (GG) (a.e.t.)	Avispa Fukuoka	Sapporo Atsubetsu Park Stadium
JST (UTC+09)

15 September 2001 2-5	Consadole Sapporo	3-2 (GG) (a.e.t.)	Shimizu S-Pulse	Sapporo Dome
JST (UTC+09)

22 September 2001 2-6	Gamba Osaka	0-0 (GG) (a.e.t.)	Consadole Sapporo	Osaka Expo '70 Stadium
JST (UTC+09)

29 September 2001 2-7	Consadole Sapporo	5-2	Vissel Kobe	Sapporo Atsubetsu Park Stadium
JST (UTC+09)

13 October 2001 2-8	Tokyo Verdy 1969	0-1	Consadole Sapporo	Tokyo Stadium
JST (UTC+09)

17 October 2001 2-9	Consadole Sapporo	4-2	Sanfrecce Hiroshima	Sapporo Atsubetsu Park Stadium
JST (UTC+09)

20 October 2001 2-10	Consadole Sapporo	1-2	Júbilo Iwata	Sapporo Atsubetsu Park Stadium
JST (UTC+09)

31 October 2001 2-11	Nagoya Grampus Eight	2-0	Consadole Sapporo	Mizuho Athletic Stadium
JST (UTC+09)

3 November 2001 2-12	Consadole Sapporo	1-1 (GG) (a.e.t.)	Urawa Red Diamonds	Sapporo Dome
JST (UTC+09)

10 November 2001 2-13	JEF United Ichihara	2-0	Consadole Sapporo	Ichihara Seaside Stadium
JST (UTC+09)

17 November 2001 2-14	Kashiwa Reysol	1-0	Consadole Sapporo	Hitachi Kashiwa Soccer Stadium
JST (UTC+09)

24 November 2001 2-15	Consadole Sapporo	0-1	Cerezo Osaka	Sapporo Dome
JST (UTC+09)

=== Emperor's Cup ===
1st Round	bye

2nd Round	bye

9 December 2001 3rd Round	Consadole Sapporo	2-3 (GG) (a.e.t.)	Kawasaki Frontale	Toyama Athletic Stadium
JST (UTC+09)

=== J.League Cup ===
4 April 2001 1st Round-1	Oita Trinita	2-0	Consadole Sapporo	Oita Athletic Stadium
JST (UTC+09)

18 April 2001 1st Round-2	Consadole Sapporo	2-1 (2-3 agg.)	Oita Trinita	Muroran Irie Stadium
JST (UTC+09)

== Player statistics ==
No.	Pos.	Nat.	Player	D.o.B. (Age)	Height / Weight	J.League 1		Emperor's Cup		J.League Cup		Total	
No.	Pos.	Nat.	Player	D.o.B. (Age)	Height / Weight	Apps	Goals	Apps	Goals	Apps	Goals	Apps	Goals
1	GK	(Japan)	Yohei Sato	November 22, 1972 (aged 28)	cm / kg	29	0						
2	DF	(Japan)	Ryuji Tabuchi	February 16, 1973 (aged 28)	cm / kg	29	0						
3	DF	(Japan)	Hideaki Mori	October 16, 1972 (aged 28)	cm / kg	23	0						
4	DF	(Japan)	Takumi Morikawa	July 11, 1977 (aged 23)	cm / kg	15	0						
5	DF	(Japan)	Yoshihiro Natsuka	October 7, 1969 (aged 31)	cm / kg	18	0						
6	DF	(Japan)	Kensaku Omori	November 21, 1975 (aged 25)	cm / kg	29	0						
7	MF	(Japan)	Yoshikazu Nonomura	May 8, 1972 (aged 28)	cm / kg	22	0						
8	MF	(Brazil)	Biju	September 17, 1974 (aged 26)	cm / kg	24	1						
9	FW	(Brazil)	Will	December 15, 1973 (aged 27)	cm / kg	26	24						
10	MF	(Brazil)	Almir	May 11, 1973 (aged 27)	cm / kg	14	0						
11	FW	(Japan)	Ryūji Bando	August 2, 1979 (aged 21)	cm / kg	27	9						
13	FW	(Japan)	Tomotaka Fukagawa	July 24, 1972 (aged 28)	cm / kg	11	0						
14	DF	(Japan)	Tsuyoshi Furukawa	September 21, 1972 (aged 28)	cm / kg	13	0						
15	MF	(Japan)	Haruki Seto	March 14, 1978 (aged 22)	cm / kg	2	0						
15	MF	(Japan)	Hitoshi Morishita	September 21, 1972 (aged 28)	cm / kg	13	0						
16	FW	(Japan)	Kenji Kikawada	October 28, 1974 (aged 26)	cm / kg	13	0						
17	FW	(Japan)	Masashi Oguro	May 4, 1980 (aged 20)	cm / kg	4	0						
18	MF	(Japan)	Koji Yamase	September 22, 1981 (aged 19)	cm / kg	24	3						
19	MF	(Japan)	Yuzuki Ito	April 7, 1974 (aged 26)	cm / kg	14	1						
20	MF	(Japan)	Tomohiro Wanami	April 27, 1980 (aged 20)	cm / kg	20	2						
21	GK	(Japan)	Yosuke Fujigaya	February 13, 1981 (aged 20)	cm / kg	1	0						
22	DF	(Japan)	Kyosuke Yoshikawa	November 8, 1978 (aged 22)	cm / kg	0	0						
23	DF	(Japan)	Yushi Soda	July 5, 1978 (aged 22)	cm / kg	9	0						
24	MF	(Japan)	Yasuyoshi Nara	December 12, 1982 (aged 18)	cm / kg	0	0						
25	MF	(Japan)	Koji Nakao	September 8, 1981 (aged 19)	cm / kg	3	0						
26	DF	(Japan)	Yasuyuki Konno	January 25, 1983 (aged 18)	cm / kg	17	0						
27	FW	(Japan)	Shinya Tokuni	April 8, 1981 (aged 19)	cm / kg	0	0						
28	MF	(Brazil)	Adalto	August 30, 1978 (aged 22)	cm / kg	7	2						
29	GK	(Japan)	Atsushi Inoue	May 28, 1977 (aged 23)	cm / kg	0	0						
30	GK	(Japan)	Hiroki Kobayashi	May 24, 1977 (aged 23)	cm / kg	0	0						
31	FW	(Japan)	Gakuya Horii	July 3, 1975 (aged 25)	cm / kg	6	1						
