= 2000 Consadole Sapporo season =

Consadole Sapporo
2000 season
- Manager: Takeshi Okada
- Stadium: Sapporo Atsubetsu Park Stadium
- J.League 2: 1st
- Emperor's Cup: 4th Round
- J.League Cup: 1st Round
- Top goalscorer: Emerson (31)
Home colours	Away colours

This is the page for the 2000 Consadole Sapporo season.

== Competitions ==
Competitions	Position
J.League 2	1st / 11 clubs
Emperor's Cup	4th round
J.League Cup	1st round

== Domestic results ==
=== J.League 2 ===
12 March 2000 1	Sagan Tosu	0-4	Consadole Sapporo	Tosu Stadium
JST (UTC+09)

20 March 2000 2	Ventforet Kofu	0-3	Consadole Sapporo	Kose Sports Park Stadium
JST (UTC+09)

3	bye

30 March 2000 4	Consadole Sapporo	3-0	Albirex Niigata	Muroran Irie Stadium
JST (UTC+09)

2 April 2000 5	Vegalta Sendai	1-2	Consadole Sapporo	Sendai Stadium
JST (UTC+09)

16 July 2000 6	Consadole Sapporo	1-1 (GG) (a.e.t.)	Urawa Red Diamonds	Muroran Irie Stadium
JST (UTC+09)

15 April 2000 7	Oita Trinita	0-0 (GG) (a.e.t.)	Consadole Sapporo	Oita Athletic Stadium
JST (UTC+09)

23 April 2000 8	Consadole Sapporo	0-3	Montedio Yamagata	Hakodate Chiyogadai Stadium
JST (UTC+09)

30 April 2000 9	Mito HollyHock	0-2	Consadole Sapporo	Hitachinaka City Stadium
JST (UTC+09)

4 May 2000 10	Consadole Sapporo	2-1 (GG) (a.e.t.)	Shonan Bellmare	Sapporo Atsubetsu Park Stadium
JST (UTC+09)

8 May 2000 11	Omiya Ardija	0-2	Consadole Sapporo	Omiya Football Stadium
JST (UTC+09)

14 May 2000 12	Consadole Sapporo	2-0	Sagan Tosu	Sapporo Atsubetsu Park Stadium
JST (UTC+09)

18 May 2000 13	Consadole Sapporo	2-1	Ventforet Kofu	Sapporo Atsubetsu Park Stadium
JST (UTC+09)

14	bye

27 May 2000 15	Albirex Niigata	0-1	Consadole Sapporo	Niigata City Athletic Stadium
JST (UTC+09)

1 June 2000 16	Consadole Sapporo	3-1	Vegalta Sendai	Sapporo Atsubetsu Park Stadium
JST (UTC+09)

4 June 2000 17	Urawa Red Diamonds	0-1	Consadole Sapporo	Urawa Komaba Stadium
JST (UTC+09)

10 June 2000 18	Consadole Sapporo	2-1 (GG) (a.e.t.)	Oita Trinita	Sapporo Atsubetsu Park Stadium
JST (UTC+09)

17 June 2000 19	Montedio Yamagata	0-1	Consadole Sapporo	Yamagata Park Stadium
JST (UTC+09)

21 June 2000 20	Consadole Sapporo	3-0	Mito HollyHock	Sapporo Atsubetsu Park Stadium
JST (UTC+09)

25 June 2000 21	Shonan Bellmare	1-2	Consadole Sapporo	Hiratsuka Athletics Stadium
JST (UTC+09)

2 July 2000 22	Consadole Sapporo	2-1	Omiya Ardija	Sapporo Atsubetsu Park Stadium
JST (UTC+09)

9 July 2000 23	Consadole Sapporo	2-1 (GG) (a.e.t.)	Albirex Niigata	Sapporo Atsubetsu Park Stadium
JST (UTC+09)

22 July 2000 24	Vegalta Sendai	0-2	Consadole Sapporo	Sendai Stadium
JST (UTC+09)

29 July 2000 25	Consadole Sapporo	2-1	Urawa Red Diamonds	Sapporo Atsubetsu Park Stadium
JST (UTC+09)

2 August 2000 26	Oita Trinita	1-0	Consadole Sapporo	Oita Athletic Stadium
JST (UTC+09)

5 August 2000 27	Consadole Sapporo	1-0	Montedio Yamagata	Sapporo Atsubetsu Park Stadium
JST (UTC+09)

12 August 2000 28	Mito HollyHock	0-2	Consadole Sapporo	Hitachinaka City Stadium
JST (UTC+09)

19 August 2000 29	Consadole Sapporo	1-1 (GG) (a.e.t.)	Shonan Bellmare	Sapporo Atsubetsu Park Stadium
JST (UTC+09)

26 August 2000 30	Omiya Ardija	0-2	Consadole Sapporo	Omiya Football Stadium
JST (UTC+09)

3 September 2000 31	Consadole Sapporo	1-2	Sagan Tosu	Sapporo Atsubetsu Park Stadium
JST (UTC+09)

11 September 2000 32	Ventforet Kofu	0-2	Consadole Sapporo	Kose Sports Park Stadium
JST (UTC+09)

33	bye

24 September 2000 34	Consadole Sapporo	1-0	Vegalta Sendai	Sapporo Atsubetsu Park Stadium
JST (UTC+09)

28 September 2000 35	Urawa Red Diamonds	1-2 (GG) (a.e.t.)	Consadole Sapporo	Urawa Komaba Stadium
JST (UTC+09)

1 October 2000 36	Consadole Sapporo	2-1	Oita Trinita	Sapporo Atsubetsu Park Stadium
JST (UTC+09)

8 October 2000 37	Montedio Yamagata	0-0 (GG) (a.e.t.)	Consadole Sapporo	Yamagata Park Stadium
JST (UTC+09)

15 October 2000 38	Consadole Sapporo	5-0	Mito HollyHock	Sapporo Atsubetsu Park Stadium
JST (UTC+09)

21 October 2000 39	Shonan Bellmare	0-3	Consadole Sapporo	Hiratsuka Athletics Stadium
JST (UTC+09)

29 October 2000 40	Consadole Sapporo	2-0	Omiya Ardija	Sapporo Atsubetsu Park Stadium
JST (UTC+09)

5 November 2000 41	Sagan Tosu	2-0	Consadole Sapporo	Tosu Stadium
JST (UTC+09)

12 November 2000 42	Consadole Sapporo	1-1 (GG) (a.e.t.)	Ventforet Kofu	Sapporo Atsubetsu Park Stadium
JST (UTC+09)

43	bye

19 November 2000 44	Albirex Niigata	1-2	Consadole Sapporo	Niigata City Athletic Stadium
JST (UTC+09)

=== Emperor's Cup ===
25 November 2000 1st Round	Gunma Fortona	0-2	Consadole Sapporo	Gunma Shikishima Soccer Stadium
JST (UTC+09)

3 December 2000 2nd Round	Consadole Sapporo	6-0	Kusatsu Higashi High School	Muroran Irie Stadium
JST (UTC+09)

10 December 2000 3rd Round	Kyoto Purple Sanga	0-1	Consadole Sapporo	Nishikyogoku Athletic Stadium
JST (UTC+09)

17 December 2000 4th Round	Yokohama F. Marinos	2-1 (GG) (a.e.t.)	Consadole Sapporo	Ehime Matsuyama Athletic Stadium
JST (UTC+09)

=== J.League Cup ===
24 May 2000 1st Round-1	Consadole Sapporo	0-1	Gamba Osaka	Sapporo Atsubetsu Park Stadium
JST (UTC+09)

19 April 2000 1st Round-2	Gamba Osaka	2-1 (3-1 agg.)	Consadole Sapporo	Osaka Expo '70 Stadium
JST (UTC+09)

== Player statistics ==
No.	Pos.	Nat.	Player	D.o.B. (Age)	Height / Weight	J.League 2		Emperor's Cup		J.League Cup		Total	
No.	Pos.	Nat.	Player	D.o.B. (Age)	Height / Weight	Apps	Goals	Apps	Goals	Apps	Goals	Apps	Goals
1	GK	(Japan)	Yohei Sato	November 22, 1972 (aged 27)	cm / kg	37	0						
2	DF	(Japan)	Ryuji Tabuchi	February 16, 1973 (aged 27)	cm / kg	36	1						
3	DF	(Japan)	Hideaki Mori	October 16, 1972 (aged 27)	cm / kg	33	2						
4	DF	(Japan)	Yoshifumi Ono	May 22, 1978 (aged 21)	cm / kg	6	0						
5	DF	(Japan)	Yoshihiro Natsuka	October 7, 1969 (aged 30)	cm / kg	29	3						
6	DF	(Japan)	Kensaku Omori	November 21, 1975 (aged 24)	cm / kg	38	1						
7	MF	(Japan)	Yoshikazu Nonomura	May 8, 1972 (aged 27)	cm / kg	36	2						
8	MF	(Brazil)	Biju	September 17, 1974 (aged 25)	cm / kg	33	6						
9	FW	(Brazil)	Emerson	September 6, 1981 (aged 18)	cm / kg	34	31						
10	MF	(Brazil)	Almir	May 11, 1973 (aged 26)	cm / kg	40	1						
11	FW	(Japan)	Ryūji Bando	August 2, 1979 (aged 20)	cm / kg	30	15						
13	FW	(Japan)	Tomotaka Fukagawa	July 24, 1972 (aged 27)	cm / kg	13	1						
14	DF	(Japan)	Tsuyoshi Furukawa	September 21, 1972 (aged 27)	cm / kg	26	0						
15	DF	(Japan)	Tatsuya Murata	August 8, 1972 (aged 27)	cm / kg	7	0						
16	FW	(Japan)	Kenji Kikawada	October 28, 1974 (aged 25)	cm / kg	30	5						
17	MF	(Japan)	Hiromasa Suguri	July 29, 1976 (aged 23)	cm / kg	4	0						
17	FW	(Japan)	Norihisa Shimizu	October 4, 1976 (aged 23)	cm / kg	7	0						
18	FW	(Japan)	Takuya Takagi	November 12, 1967 (aged 32)	cm / kg	17	0						
19	MF	(Japan)	Yuzuki Ito	April 7, 1974 (aged 25)	cm / kg	33	0						
20	DF	(Japan)	Tamotsu Komatsuzaki	July 10, 1970 (aged 29)	cm / kg	8	0						
21	GK	(Japan)	Yosuke Fujigaya	February 13, 1981 (aged 19)	cm / kg	0	0						
22	DF	(Japan)	Tomohiko Ikeuchi	November 1, 1977 (aged 22)	cm / kg	12	0						
23	MF	(Japan)	Ippei Saga	May 20, 1980 (aged 19)	cm / kg	2	0						
24	FW	(Japan)	Yu Kawamura	December 1, 1980 (aged 19)	cm / kg	2	0						
25	MF	(Japan)	Koji Nakao	September 8, 1981 (aged 18)	cm / kg	1	0						
26	FW	(Japan)	Takashi Sakurai	May 4, 1977 (aged 22)	cm / kg	4	0						
27	FW	(Japan)	Shinya Tokuni	April 8, 1981 (aged 18)	cm / kg	0	0						
28	MF	(Japan)	Koji Yamase	September 22, 1981 (aged 18)	cm / kg	14	2						
29	GK	(Japan)	Atsushi Inoue	May 28, 1977 (aged 22)	cm / kg	0	0						
30	GK	(Japan)	Hiroki Kobayashi	May 24, 1977 (aged 22)	cm / kg	3	0						
