= 2003 Consadole Sapporo season =

Consadole Sapporo
2003 season
- Manager: João Carlos; Chang Woe-Ryong
- Stadium: Sapporo Dome
- J. League 2: 9th
- Emperor's Cup: 3rd Round
- Top goalscorer: Gakuya Horii (8)
Home colours	Away colours

2003 Consadole Sapporo season

== Competitions ==
Competitions	Position
J. League 2	9th / 12 clubs
Emperor's Cup	3rd Round

== Domestic results ==
=== J. League 2 ===
Match	Date	Venue	Opponents	Score
1	2003.3.15	Sapporo Dome	Yokohama F.C.	1-3
2	2003.3.22	Yamagata Park Stadium	Montedio Yamagata	3-2
3	2003.3.29	Sapporo Dome	Mito HollyHock	2-4
4	2003.4.5	Niigata City Athletic Stadium	Albirex Niigata	1-0
5	2003.4.9	Ōmiya Park Soccer Stadium	Omiya Ardija	1-1
6	2003.4.12	Muroran Irie Stadium	Avispa Fukuoka	5-0
7	2003.4.19	Kose Sports Stadium	Ventforet Kofu	1-2
8	2003.4.26	Sapporo Dome	Sanfrecce Hiroshima	0-2
9	2003.4.29	Tosu Stadium	Sagan Tosu	0-1
10	2003.5.5	Sapporo Atsubetsu Park Stadium	Kawasaki Frontale	0-0
11	2003.5.10	Hiratsuka Athletics Stadium	Shonan Bellmare	2-0
12	2003.5.14	Mitsuzawa Stadium	Yokohama F.C.	0-0
13	2003.5.17	Sapporo Atsubetsu Park Stadium	Montedio Yamagata	1-0
14	2003.5.24	Mito City Athletic Stadium	Mito HollyHock	1-1
15	2003.5.31	Sapporo Dome	Albirex Niigata	2-0
16	2003.6.6	Todoroki Athletics Stadium	Kawasaki Frontale	0-1
17	2003.6.14	Sapporo Atsubetsu Park Stadium	Shonan Bellmare	1-1
18	2003.6.18	Hiroshima Stadium	Sanfrecce Hiroshima	1-1
19	2003.6.21	Sapporo Dome	Ventforet Kofu	3-3
20	2003.6.28	Hakatanomori Athletic Stadium	Avispa Fukuoka	0-0
21	2003.7.2	Sapporo Dome	Omiya Ardija	6-2
22	2003.7.5	Sapporo Atsubetsu Park Stadium	Sagan Tosu	3-0
23	2003.7.19	Hiratsuka Athletics Stadium	Shonan Bellmare	2-0
24	2003.7.26	Yamagata Park Stadium	Montedio Yamagata	1-2
25	2003.7.30	Sapporo Atsubetsu Park Stadium	Yokohama F.C.	2-2
26	2003.8.2	Niigata Stadium	Albirex Niigata	1-5
27	2003.8.10	Sapporo Dome	Kawasaki Frontale	1-1
28	2003.8.16	Kose Sports Stadium	Ventforet Kofu	1-1
29	2003.8.23	Chiyogadai Park Athletic Studium, Hakodate	Avispa Fukuoka	1-2
30	2003.8.30	Ōmiya Park Soccer Stadium	Omiya Ardija	0-3
31	2003.9.3	Sapporo Atsubetsu Park Stadium	Sanfrecce Hiroshima	1-2
32	2003.9.6	Tosu Stadium	Sagan Tosu	1-0
33	2003.9.13	Sapporo Atsubetsu Park Stadium	Mito HollyHock	1-0
34	2003.9.20	Sapporo Atsubetsu Park Stadium	Ventforet Kofu	0-2
35	2003.9.23	Hakatanomori Athletic Stadium	Avispa Fukuoka	0-1
36	2003.9.27	Sapporo Dome	Shonan Bellmare	1-2
37	2003.10.4	Hiroshima Big Arch	Sanfrecce Hiroshima	0-1
38	2003.10.11	Sapporo Atsubetsu Park Stadium	Sagan Tosu	4-1
39	2003.10.18	Todoroki Athletics Stadium	Kawasaki Frontale	0-1
40	2003.10.25	Muroran Irie Stadium	Omiya Ardija	0-1
41	2003.11.1	Sapporo Atsubetsu Park Stadium	Albirex Niigata	2-2
42	2003.11.9	Kasamatsu Stadium	Mito HollyHock	0-0
43	2003.11.16	Sapporo Dome	Montedio Yamagata	4-1
44	2003.11.23	International Stadium Yokohama	Yokohama F.C.	0-2

=== Emperor's Cup ===
Match	Date	Venue	Opponents	Score
1st round	2003.11.30	Marugame	Jinsei Gakuen High School	4 - 0
2nd round	2003.12.07	Muroran	Shizuoka Sangyo University	3 - 2
3rd round	2003.12.14	Expo '70, Suita	Gamba Osaka	1 - 3

== Player statistics ==
No.	Pos.	Player	D.o.B. (Age)	Height / Weight	J. League 2		Emperor's Cup		Total	
No.	Pos.	Player	D.o.B. (Age)	Height / Weight	Apps	Goals	Apps	Goals	Apps	Goals
1	GK	Yohei Sato	November 22, 1972 (aged 30)	cm / kg	7	0				
2	MF	Hitoshi Morishita	September 21, 1972 (aged 30)	cm / kg	37	1				
3	DF	Hideaki Mori	October 16, 1972 (aged 30)	cm / kg	4	0				
4	DF	Yasuyuki Konno	January 25, 1983 (aged 20)	cm / kg	26	2				
5	DF	Jin Sato	September 27, 1974 (aged 28)	cm / kg	28	4				
6	DF	Kensaku Omori	November 21, 1975 (aged 27)	cm / kg	14	0				
7	MF	Naoki Sakai	August 2, 1975 (aged 27)	cm / kg	10	0				
8	MF	Beto	January 7, 1975 (aged 28)	cm / kg	7	1				
8	MF	Vital	February 29, 1976 (aged 27)	cm / kg	22	5				
9	FW	Will	December 15, 1973 (aged 29)	cm / kg	4	4				
9	FW	Andradina	September 13, 1974 (aged 28)	cm / kg	22	6				
10	MF	Robert	April 3, 1971 (aged 31)	cm / kg	17	5				
10	MF	Tarik Oulida	January 19, 1974 (aged 29)	cm / kg	13	1				
11	FW	Shinya Aikawa	July 26, 1983 (aged 19)	cm / kg	11	0				
13	MF	Tomokazu Hirama	June 30, 1977 (aged 25)	cm / kg	8	0				
14	DF	Junji Nishizawa	May 10, 1974 (aged 28)	cm / kg	21	1				
15	FW	Yasuyuki Moriyama	May 1, 1969 (aged 33)	cm / kg	5	0				
16	FW	Gakuya Horii	July 3, 1975 (aged 27)	cm / kg	41	8				
17	FW	Tatsunori Arai	December 22, 1983 (aged 19)	cm / kg	35	3				
18	DF	Yushi Soda	July 5, 1978 (aged 24)	cm / kg	38	4				
19	MF	Koji Nakao	September 8, 1981 (aged 21)	cm / kg	24	0				
20	MF	Tomohiro Wanami	April 27, 1980 (aged 22)	cm / kg	35	4				
21	GK	Yosuke Fujigaya	February 13, 1981 (aged 22)	cm / kg	37	0				
22	DF	Kyosuke Yoshikawa	November 8, 1978 (aged 24)	cm / kg	14	0				
23	MF	Makoto Sunakawa	August 10, 1977 (aged 25)	cm / kg	34	6				
24	FW	Yu Kawamura	December 1, 1980 (aged 22)	cm / kg	1	0				
25	DF	Yoshihiro Nishida	January 30, 1973 (aged 30)	cm / kg	16	0				
26	DF	Hiroshi Kichise	July 10, 1983 (aged 19)	cm / kg	0	0				
27	MF	Hiroki Mihara	April 20, 1978 (aged 24)	cm / kg	17	0				
28	DF	Akihiro Tabata	May 15, 1978 (aged 24)	cm / kg	7	0				
29	GK	Atsushi Inoue	May 28, 1977 (aged 25)	cm / kg	0	0				
30	GK	Tetsuya Abe	June 24, 1983 (aged 19)	cm / kg	0	0				
31	MF	Yuji Ozaki	May 4, 1984 (aged 18)	cm / kg	0	0				
32	DF	Atsushi Ichimura	November 18, 1984 (aged 18)	cm / kg	5	0				
33	DF	Yuki Okada	October 4, 1983 (aged 19)	cm / kg	16	1				
34	DF	Takuya Kawaguchi	October 11, 1978 (aged 24)	cm / kg	21	0				
35	DF	Kazuya Kawabata	October 22, 1981 (aged 21)	cm / kg	1	0				

== Other pages ==
- (in Japanese) J. League official site
