= Atsushi Inoue =

Japanese footballer

Atsushi Inoue 井上 敦史
Personal information
- Full name: Atsushi Inoue
- Date of birth: May 28, 1977 (age 49)
- Place of birth: Niiza, Saitama, Japan
- Height: 1.81 m (5 ft 11 1/2 in)
- Position: Goalkeeper

Youth career
- 1993–1995: Saitama Urawa High School

College career
Years	Team	Apps	(Gls)
1996–1999	University of Tsukuba		

Senior career*
Years	Team	Apps	(Gls)
2000–2003	Consadole Sapporo	0	(0)
2004–2006	Yokogawa Musashino	88	(0)
2007–2012	Gainare Tottori	74	(0)
Total		162	(0)
- * Club domestic league appearances and goals

Atsushi Inoue (井上 敦史, Inoue Atsushi; born May 28, 1977) is a Japanese former footballer.

== Playing career ==
Inoue was born in Niiza on May 28, 1977. After graduating from University of Tsukuba, he joined J2 League club Consadole Sapporo in 2000. However he could not play at all in the match behind Yohei Sato and Yosuke Fujigaya until 2003. In 2004, he moved to Japan Football League (JFL) club Yokogawa Musashino. He became a regular goalkeeper and played many matches until 2006. In 2007, he moved to JFL club Gainare Tottori. He played many matches as regular goalkeeper until 2008. However he could not play at all in the match behind Junnosuke Schneider in 2009 and Kiyomitsu Kobari in 2010. The club was promoted to J2 from 2011 and he played several matches from 2011. However he could not play many matches and retired end of 2012 season.

== Career statistics ==
Appearances and goals by club, season and competition
Club	Season	League			Emperor's Cup		J.League Cup		Total	
Club	Season	Division	Apps	Goals	Apps	Goals	Apps	Goals	Apps	Goals
Consadole Sapporo	2000	J2 League	0	0	0	0	0	0	0	0
Consadole Sapporo	2001	J1 League	0	0	0	0	0	0	0	0
Consadole Sapporo	2002	J1 League	0	0	0	0	0	0	0	0
Consadole Sapporo	2003	J2 League	0	0	0	0	—		0	0
Yokogawa Musashino	2004	Football League	28	0	—		—		28	0
Yokogawa Musashino	2005	Football League	27	0	—		—		27	0
Yokogawa Musashino	2006	Football League	33	0	—		—		33	0
Gainare Tottori	2007	Football League	34	0	2	0	—		36	0
Gainare Tottori	2008	Football League	31	0	1	0	—		32	0
Gainare Tottori	2009	Football League	0	0	0	0	—		0	0
Gainare Tottori	2010	Football League	0	0	0	0	—		0	0
Gainare Tottori	2011	J2 League	6	0	1	0	—		7	0
Gainare Tottori	2012	J2 League	3	0	0	0	—		3	0
Career total			162	0	4	0	0	0	166	0
