= 1998 Consadole Sapporo season =

Consadole Sapporo
1998 season
- Manager: Fernández; Hajime Ishii
- Stadium: Sapporo Atsubetsu Park Stadium
- J.League: 14th
- Emperor's Cup: 4th Round
- J.League Cup: GL-C 5th
- Top goalscorer: Valdés (21)
| Home colours | Away colours |

1998 Consadole Sapporo season

== Competitions ==
| Competitions | Position |
|---|---|
| J.League | 14th / 18 clubs |
| Emperor's Cup | 4th round |
| J.League Cup | GL-C 5th / 5 clubs |

== Domestic results ==
=== J.League ===
| 21 March 1998 1-1 | Shimizu S-Pulse | 4-1 | Consadole Sapporo | Nihondaira Sports Stadium |
| JST (UTC+09) |

| 25 March 1998 1-2 | Consadole Sapporo | 1-3 | Kashima Antlers | Sendai Stadium |
| JST (UTC+09) |

| 28 March 1998 1-3 | Kashiwa Reysol | 1-1 (GG) (a.e.t.) (5-4 p) | Consadole Sapporo | Hitachi Kashiwa Soccer Stadium |
| JST (UTC+09) |

| 4 April 1998 1-4 | Consadole Sapporo | 1-0 | Gamba Osaka | Muroran Irie Stadium |
| JST (UTC+09) |

| 11 April 1998 1-5 | Yokohama Marinos | 4-0 | Consadole Sapporo | Yokohama Mitsuzawa Stadium |
| JST (UTC+09) |

| 15 April 1998 1-6 | Consadole Sapporo | 2-0 | Urawa Red Diamonds | Sendai Stadium |
| JST (UTC+09) |

| 18 April 1998 1-7 | Nagoya Grampus Eight | 2-1 (GG) (a.e.t.) | Consadole Sapporo | Mizuho Athletic Stadium |
| JST (UTC+09) |

| 25 April 1998 1-8 | Consadole Sapporo | 3-3 (GG) (a.e.t.) (4-5 p) | Bellmare Hiratsuka | Muroran Irie Stadium |
| JST (UTC+09) |

| 29 April 1998 1-9 | Júbilo Iwata | 4-0 | Consadole Sapporo | Júbilo Iwata Stadium |
| JST (UTC+09) |

| 2 May 1998 1-10 | Consadole Sapporo | 1-3 | Verdy Kawasaki | Muroran Irie Stadium |
| JST (UTC+09) |

| 5 May 1998 1-11 | Vissel Kobe | 2-3 | Consadole Sapporo | Kobe Universiade Memorial Stadium |
| JST (UTC+09) |

| 9 May 1998 1-12 | Consadole Sapporo | 3-2 (GG) (a.e.t.) | JEF United Ichihara | Muroran Irie Stadium |
| JST (UTC+09) |

| 25 July 1998 1-13 | Yokohama Flügels | 2-2 (GG) (a.e.t.) (5-3 p) | Consadole Sapporo | Yokohama Mitsuzawa Stadium |
| JST (UTC+09) |

| 29 July 1998 1-14 | Consadole Sapporo | 3-4 | Cerezo Osaka | Sapporo Atsubetsu Park Stadium |
| JST (UTC+09) |

| 1 August 1998 1-15 | Sanfrecce Hiroshima | 4-3 (GG) (a.e.t.) | Consadole Sapporo | Hiroshima Stadium |
| JST (UTC+09) |

| 5 August 1998 1-16 | Consadole Sapporo | 1-2 | Avispa Fukuoka | Sapporo Atsubetsu Park Stadium |
| JST (UTC+09) |

| 8 August 1998 1-17 | Kyoto Purple Sanga | 4-2 | Consadole Sapporo | Nishikyogoku Athletic Stadium |
| JST (UTC+09) |

| 22 August 1998 2-1 | Cerezo Osaka | 1-3 | Consadole Sapporo | Osaka Nagai Stadium |
| JST (UTC+09) |

| 29 August 1998 2-2 | Consadole Sapporo | 2-0 | Sanfrecce Hiroshima | Sapporo Atsubetsu Park Stadium |
| JST (UTC+09) |

| 5 September 1998 2-3 | Avispa Fukuoka | 1-0 | Consadole Sapporo | Hakatanomori Football Stadium |
| JST (UTC+09) |

| 12 September 1998 2-4 | Consadole Sapporo | 2-0 | Kyoto Purple Sanga | Sapporo Atsubetsu Park Stadium |
| JST (UTC+09) |

| 15 September 1998 2-5 | Consadole Sapporo | 1-2 (GG) (a.e.t.) | Shimizu S-Pulse | Sapporo Atsubetsu Park Stadium |
| JST (UTC+09) |

| 19 September 1998 2-6 | Kashima Antlers | 3-2 | Consadole Sapporo | Kashima Soccer Stadium |
| JST (UTC+09) |

| 23 September 1998 2-7 | Consadole Sapporo | 3-2 | Kashiwa Reysol | Sapporo Atsubetsu Park Stadium |
| JST (UTC+09) |

| 26 September 1998 2-8 | Gamba Osaka | 1-0 | Consadole Sapporo | Osaka Expo '70 Stadium |
| JST (UTC+09) |

| 3 October 1998 2-9 | Consadole Sapporo | 0-2 | Yokohama Marinos | Sapporo Atsubetsu Park Stadium |
| JST (UTC+09) |

| 14 October 1998 2-10 | Urawa Red Diamonds | 2-1 | Consadole Sapporo | Urawa Komaba Stadium |
| JST (UTC+09) |

| 17 October 1998 2-11 | Consadole Sapporo | 3-2 | Nagoya Grampus Eight | Sapporo Atsubetsu Park Stadium |
| JST (UTC+09) |

| 21 October 1998 2-12 | Bellmare Hiratsuka | 2-2 (GG) (a.e.t.) (4-3 p) | Consadole Sapporo | Hiratsuka Athletics Stadium |
| JST (UTC+09) |

| 14 October 1998 2-13 | Consadole Sapporo | 1-6 | Júbilo Iwata | Sapporo Atsubetsu Park Stadium |
| JST (UTC+09) |

| 31 October 1998 2-14 | Verdy Kawasaki | 1-2 | Consadole Sapporo | Todoroki Athletics Stadium |
| JST (UTC+09) |

| 3 November 1998 2-15 | Consadole Sapporo | 3-0 | Vissel Kobe | Sapporo Atsubetsu Park Stadium |
| JST (UTC+09) |

| 7 November 1998 2-16 | JEF United Ichihara | 1-3 | Consadole Sapporo | Ichihara Seaside Stadium |
| JST (UTC+09) |

| 14 November 1998 2-17 | Consadole Sapporo | 1-4 | Yokohama Flügels | Sapporo Atsubetsu Park Stadium |
| JST (UTC+09) |

=== Emperor's Cup ===
| 1st Round | bye |

| 9 December 1998 2nd Round | Consadole Sapporo | 1-0 | F.C. Primeiro | Bingo Athletic Stadium |
| JST (UTC+09) |

| 13 December 1998 3rd Round | Consadole Sapporo | 2-1 (GG) (a.e.t.) | Vissel Kobe | Kobe Universiade Memorial Stadium |
| JST (UTC+09) |

| 20 December 1998 4th Round | Júbilo Iwata | 3-2 | Consadole Sapporo | Gunma Shikishima Stadium |
| JST (UTC+09) |

=== J.League Cup ===
| 16 May 1998 GL-C-1 | Shimizu S-Pulse | 2-0 | Consadole Sapporo | Nihondaira Sports Stadium |
| JST (UTC+09) |

| 23 May 1998 GL-C-2 | Gamba Osaka | 5-2 | Consadole Sapporo | Osaka Expo '70 Stadium |
| JST (UTC+09) |

| 30 May 1998 GL-C-3 | Consadole Sapporo | 3-2 | Yokohama Flügels | Muroran Irie Stadium |
| JST (UTC+09) |

| GL-C-4 | bye |

| 6 June 1998 GL-C-5 | Consadole Sapporo | 0-2 | Kawasaki Frontale | Muroran Irie Stadium |
| JST (UTC+09) |

== Player statistics ==
| No. | Pos. | Nat. | Player | D.o.B. (Age) | Height / Weight | J.League | | Emperor's Cup | | J.League Cup | | Total | |
| No. | Pos. | Nat. | Player | D.o.B. (Age) | Height / Weight | Apps | Goals | Apps | Goals | Apps | Goals | Apps | Goals |
|---|---|---|---|---|---|---|---|---|---|---|---|---|---|
| 1 | GK | (Japan) | Dido Havenaar | September 26, 1957 (aged 40) | cm / kg | 34 | 0 | | | | | | |
| 2 | DF | (Japan) | Ryuji Tabuchi | February 16, 1973 (aged 25) | cm / kg | 31 | 0 | | | | | | |
| 3 | DF | (Brazil) | Pereira | March 6, 1960 (aged 38) | cm / kg | 11 | 0 | | | | | | |
| 4 | DF | (Japan) | Satoshi Kajino | November 9, 1965 (aged 32) | cm / kg | 23 | 1 | | | | | | |
| 5 | DF | (Japan) | Takashi Kiyama | February 18, 1972 (aged 26) | cm / kg | 16 | 0 | | | | | | |
| 6 | MF | (Japan) | Takamitsu Ota | July 19, 1970 (aged 27) | cm / kg | 14 | 2 | | | | | | |
| 7 | MF | (Japan) | Yoshikazu Goto | February 20, 1964 (aged 34) | cm / kg | 25 | 1 | | | | | | |
| 8 | MF | (Brazil) | Walter | October 21, 1968 (aged 29) | cm / kg | 21 | 3 | | | | | | |
| 9 | FW | (Panama) | Jorge Dely Valdés | March 12, 1967 (aged 31) | cm / kg | 31 | 21 | | | | | | |
| 10 | MF | (Argentina) | Hugo Maradona | May 9, 1969 (aged 28) | cm / kg | 28 | 5 | | | | | | |
| 11 | FW | (Japan) | Kenji Arima | November 26, 1972 (aged 25) | cm / kg | 10 | 2 | | | | | | |
| 12 | GK | (Japan) | Ryuji Kato | December 24, 1969 (aged 28) | cm / kg | 0 | 0 | | | | | | |
| 13 | FW | (Japan) | Tomotaka Fukagawa | July 24, 1972 (aged 25) | cm / kg | 24 | 2 | | | | | | |
| 14 | DF | (Japan) | Tsuyoshi Furukawa | September 21, 1972 (aged 25) | cm / kg | 22 | 0 | | | | | | |
| 15 | DF | (Japan) | Tatsuya Murata | August 8, 1972 (aged 25) | cm / kg | 18 | 1 | | | | | | |
| 16 | FW | (Japan) | Kenji Kikawada | October 28, 1974 (aged 23) | cm / kg | 20 | 1 | | | | | | |
| 17 | MF | (Japan) | Hiromasa Suguri | July 29, 1976 (aged 21) | cm / kg | 20 | 1 | | | | | | |
| 18 | FW | (Japan) | Kota Yoshihara | February 2, 1978 (aged 20) | cm / kg | 34 | 11 | | | | | | |
| 19 | DF | (Japan) | Taku Watanabe | November 9, 1971 (aged 26) | cm / kg | 14 | 1 | | | | | | |
| 20 | DF | (Japan) | Yoshifumi Ono | May 22, 1978 (aged 19) | cm / kg | 17 | 1 | | | | | | |
| 21 | GK | (Japan) | Yasuyuki Akaike | May 18, 1974 (aged 23) | cm / kg | 0 | 0 | | | | | | |
| 22 | MF | (Japan) | Tatsuya Asanuma | July 13, 1970 (aged 27) | cm / kg | 0 | 0 | | | | | | |
| 23 | MF | (Japan) | Hiromasa Tokioka | June 24, 1974 (aged 23) | cm / kg | 8 | 0 | | | | | | |
| 24 | MF | (Japan) | Nobuhito Toriizuka | August 7, 1972 (aged 25) | cm / kg | 10 | 0 | | | | | | |
| 25 | MF | (Japan) | Takashi Yamahashi | May 31, 1972 (aged 25) | cm / kg | 0 | 0 | | | | | | |
| 26 | MF | (Japan) | Naohiko Okada | December 30, 1978 (aged 19) | cm / kg | 0 | 0 | | | | | | |
| 27 | MF | (Japan) | Shin Tanada | July 25, 1969 (aged 28) | cm / kg | 8 | 3 | | | | | | |
| 28 | DF | (Japan) | Shoji Nonoshita | May 24, 1970 (aged 27) | cm / kg | 3 | 0 | | | | | | |
| 29 | FW | (Japan) | Koji Seki | June 26, 1972 (aged 25) | cm / kg | 4 | 0 | | | | | | |

== Other pages ==
- (in Japanese) J. League official site
