= 2002 Consadole Sapporo season =

Consadole Sapporo
2002 season
- Manager: Tetsuji Hashiratani; Ivančević; Chang Woe-Ryong
- Stadium: Sapporo Dome
- J.League 1: 16th
- Emperor's Cup: 3rd Round
- J.League Cup: GL-A 4th
- Top goalscorer: Takafumi Ogura (7)
Home colours	Away colours

2002 Consadole Sapporo season

== Competitions ==
Competitions	Position
J.League 1	16th / 16 clubs
Emperor's Cup	3rd round
J.League Cup	GL-A 4th / 4 clubs

== Domestic results ==
=== J.League 1 ===
Match	Date	Venue	Opponents	Score
1-1	2002.3.3	Hiroshima Big Arch	Sanfrecce Hiroshima	1-5
1-2	2002.3.9	Haruno Stadium	Vegalta Sendai	0-1
1-3	2002.3.17	Yamaha Stadium	Júbilo Iwata	0-4
1-4	2002.3.31	Mizuho Athletic Stadium	Nagoya Grampus Eight	3-0
1-5	2002.4.6	Hitachi Kashiwa Soccer Stadium	Kashiwa Reysol	1-4
1-6	2002.4.13	Muroran (ja:室蘭市入江運動公園陸上競技場)	Kyoto Purple Sanga	1-2 a.e.t. (sudden death)
1-7	2002.4.20	Hakodate (ja:函館市千代台公園陸上競技場)	Kashima Antlers	1-3
1-8	2002.7.13	Kobe Universiade Memorial Stadium	Vissel Kobe|0-1	
1-9	2002.7.20	National Olympic Stadium (Tokyo)	Urawa Red Diamonds	1-2 a.e.t. (sudden death)
1-10	2002.7.24	Sapporo Dome	Yokohama F. Marinos	2-3 a.e.t. (sudden death)
1-11	2002.7.28	National Olympic Stadium (Tokyo)	FC Tokyo	1-3
1-12	2002.8.3	Sapporo Dome	Shimizu S-Pulse	2-3
1-13	2002.8.7	Ichihara Seaside Stadium	JEF United Ichihara	0-2
1-14	2002.8.10	Sapporo Atsubetsu Park Stadium	Gamba Osaka	1-0
1-15	2002.8.17	Sapporo Dome	Tokyo Verdy 1969	1-2 a.e.t. (sudden death)
2-1	2002.8.31	Sapporo Atsubetsu Park Stadium	Kashiwa Reysol	2-2 a.e.t.
2-2	2002.9.7	Nishikyogoku Athletic Stadium	Kyoto Purple Sanga	0-1
2-3	2002.9.15	Sapporo Dome	Vissel Kobe	1-2
2-4	2002.9.18	International Stadium Yokohama	Yokohama F. Marinos	0-1 a.e.t. (sudden death)
2-5	2002.9.21	Sapporo Dome	Urawa Red Diamonds	1-2
2-6	2002.9.29	Sapporo Dome	Júbilo Iwata	0-1 a.e.t. (sudden death)
2-7	2002.10.5	Nihondaira Sports Stadium	Shimizu S-Pulse	0-3
2-8	2002.10.12	Sapporo Atsubetsu Park Stadium	FC Tokyo	0-4
2-9	2002.10.19	Osaka Expo '70 Stadium	Gamba Osaka	0-1
2-10	2002.10.23	Sapporo Dome	JEF United Ichihara	1-0
2-11	2002.10.27	Kashima Soccer Stadium	Kashima Antlers	2-3 a.e.t. (sudden death)
2-12	2002.11.9	Tokyo Stadium	Tokyo Verdy 1969	2-3 a.e.t. (sudden death)
2-13	2002.11.17	Sapporo Dome	Nagoya Grampus Eight	1-0
2-14	2002.11.23	Sendai Stadium	Vegalta Sendai	0-2
2-15	2002.11.30	Sapporo Dome	Sanfrecce Hiroshima	5-4 a.e.t. (sudden death)

=== Emperor's Cup ===
Match	Date	Venue	Opponents	Score
3rd round	2002..			-

=== J.League Cup ===
Match	Date	Venue	Opponents	Score
GL-A-1	2002..			-
GL-A-2	2002..			-
GL-A-3	2002..			-
GL-A-4	2002..			-
GL-A-5	2002..			-
GL-A-6	2002..			-

== Player statistics ==
No.	Pos.	Player	D.o.B. (Age)	Height / Weight	J.League 1		Emperor's Cup		J.League Cup		Total	
No.	Pos.	Player	D.o.B. (Age)	Height / Weight	Apps	Goals	Apps	Goals	Apps	Goals	Apps	Goals
1	GK	Yohei Sato	November 22, 1972 (aged 29)	cm / kg	27	0						
2	DF	Ryuji Tabuchi	February 16, 1973 (aged 29)	cm / kg	10	0						
3	DF	Hideaki Mori	October 16, 1972 (aged 29)	cm / kg	1	0						
4	DF	Yasuyuki Konno	January 25, 1983 (aged 19)	cm / kg	22	0						
5	DF	Maxsandro	August 3, 1972 (aged 29)	cm / kg	3	0						
5	MF	Jadílson	December 4, 1977 (aged 24)	cm / kg	17	0						
6	DF	Kensaku Omori	November 21, 1975 (aged 26)	cm / kg	29	0						
7	MF	Naoki Sakai	August 2, 1975 (aged 26)	cm / kg	17	1						
8	MF	Biju	September 17, 1974 (aged 27)	cm / kg	26	1						
9	FW	Luis Robson	September 21, 1974 (aged 27)	cm / kg	5	0						
9	FW	Yasuyuki Moriyama	May 1, 1969 (aged 32)	cm / kg	4	0						
10	MF	Koji Yamase	September 22, 1981 (aged 20)	cm / kg	14	4						
11	MF	Hiromi Kojima	December 12, 1977 (aged 24)	cm / kg	5	0						
11	FW	Kazushi Isoyama	January 8, 1975 (aged 27)	cm / kg	5	0						
13	MF	Tomokazu Hirama	June 30, 1977 (aged 24)	cm / kg	15	0						
14	DF	Tsuyoshi Furukawa	September 21, 1972 (aged 29)	cm / kg	16	0						
15	MF	Hitoshi Morishita	September 21, 1972 (aged 29)	cm / kg	29	2						
16	FW	Gakuya Horii	July 3, 1975 (aged 26)	cm / kg	14	1						
17	FW	Takafumi Ogura	July 6, 1973 (aged 28)	cm / kg	27	7						
18	DF	Yushi Soda	July 5, 1978 (aged 23)	cm / kg	23	4						
19	MF	Koji Nakao	September 8, 1981 (aged 20)	cm / kg	0	0						
20	MF	Tomohiro Wanami	April 27, 1980 (aged 21)	cm / kg	25	0						
21	GK	Yosuke Fujigaya	February 13, 1981 (aged 21)	cm / kg	4	0						
22	DF	Kyosuke Yoshikawa	November 8, 1978 (aged 23)	cm / kg	9	0						
23	FW	Shinya Aikawa	July 26, 1983 (aged 18)	cm / kg	4	2						
24	MF	Yasuyoshi Nara	December 12, 1982 (aged 19)	cm / kg	1	0						
25	FW	Tatsunori Arai	December 22, 1983 (aged 18)	cm / kg	5	2						
26	DF	Hiroshi Kichise	July 10, 1983 (aged 18)	cm / kg	1	0						
27	FW	Yuki Tazawa	July 16, 1979 (aged 22)	cm / kg	1	0						
28	FW	Srđan Baljak	November 25, 1978 (aged 23)	cm / kg	13	3						
29	GK	Atsushi Inoue	May 28, 1977 (aged 24)	cm / kg	0	0						
30	GK	Tetsuya Abe	June 24, 1983 (aged 18)	cm / kg	0	0						
31	DF	Yoshihiro Nishida	January 30, 1973 (aged 29)	cm / kg	16	1						
32	DF	Jin Sato	September 27, 1974 (aged 27)	cm / kg	19	1						
33	MF	Tomoaki Matsukawa	April 18, 1973 (aged 28)	cm / kg	4	0						

== Other pages ==
- (in Japanese) J. League official site
