= 1999 Consadole Sapporo season =

Consadole Sapporo
1999 season
- Manager: Takeshi Okada
- Stadium: Sapporo Atsubetsu Park Stadium
- J.League 2: 5th
- Emperor's Cup: 3rd Round
- J.League Cup: 1st Round
- Top goalscorer: Kota Yoshihara (15)
Home colours	Away colours

1999 Consadole Sapporo season

== Competitions ==
Competitions	Position
J.League 2	5th / 10 clubs
Emperor's Cup	3rd round
J.League Cup	1st round

== Domestic results ==
=== J.League 2 ===
14 March 1999 1	Oita Trinita	1-0	Consadole Sapporo	Oita Athletic Stadium
JST (UTC+09)

21 March 1999 2	Omiya Ardija	1-2	Consadole Sapporo	Omiya Football Stadium
JST (UTC+09)

28 March 1999 3	Consadole Sapporo	2-3	Sagan Tosu	Muroran Irie Stadium
JST (UTC+09)

4 April 1999 4	Vegalta Sendai	1-1 (GG) (a.e.t.)	Consadole Sapporo	Sendai Stadium
JST (UTC+09)

11 April 1999 5	Consadole Sapporo	0-1	Albirex Niigata	Muroran Irie Stadium
JST (UTC+09)

18 April 1999 6	Kawasaki Frontale	2-0	Consadole Sapporo	Todoroki Athletics Stadium
JST (UTC+09)

25 April 1999 7	Consadole Sapporo	3-2	Montedio Yamagata	Muroran Irie Stadium
JST (UTC+09)

29 April 1999 8	FC Tokyo	2-1	Consadole Sapporo	Nishigaoka Soccer Stadium
JST (UTC+09)

2 May 1999 9	Consadole Sapporo	6-0	Ventforet Kofu	Sapporo Atsubetsu Park Stadium
JST (UTC+09)

5 May 1999 10	Consadole Sapporo	1-0	Omiya Ardija	Sapporo Atsubetsu Park Stadium
JST (UTC+09)

9 May 1999 11	Sagan Tosu	2-2 (GG) (a.e.t.)	Consadole Sapporo	Tosu Stadium
JST (UTC+09)

16 May 1999 12	Consadole Sapporo	3-0	Vegalta Sendai	Sapporo Atsubetsu Park Stadium
JST (UTC+09)

22 May 1999 13	Albirex Niigata	0-1	Consadole Sapporo	Niigata City Athletic Stadium
JST (UTC+09)

29 May 1999 14	Consadole Sapporo	1-1 (GG) (a.e.t.)	Kawasaki Frontale	Sapporo Atsubetsu Park Stadium
JST (UTC+09)

27 June 1999 15	Montedio Yamagata	1-1 (GG) (a.e.t.)	Consadole Sapporo	Yamagata Park Stadium
JST (UTC+09)

4 July 1999 16	Consadole Sapporo	0-1	FC Tokyo	Sapporo Atsubetsu Park Stadium
JST (UTC+09)

9 July 1999 17	Ventforet Kofu	1-1 (GG) (a.e.t.)	Consadole Sapporo	Kose Sports Park Stadium
JST (UTC+09)

17 July 1999 18	Consadole Sapporo	1-0 (GG) (a.e.t.)	Oita Trinita	Sapporo Atsubetsu Park Stadium
JST (UTC+09)

1 August 1999 19	Consadole Sapporo	2-0	Vegalta Sendai	Sapporo Atsubetsu Park Stadium
JST (UTC+09)

7 August 1999 20	Albirex Niigata	1-1 (GG) (a.e.t.)	Consadole Sapporo	Niigata City Athletic Stadium
JST (UTC+09)

15 August 1999 21	Consadole Sapporo	3-2 (GG) (a.e.t.)	Oita Trinita	Sapporo Atsubetsu Park Stadium
JST (UTC+09)

23 August 1999 22	Montedio Yamagata	1-4	Consadole Sapporo	Yamagata Park Stadium
JST (UTC+09)

29 August 1999 23	Consadole Sapporo	4-1	FC Tokyo	Sapporo Atsubetsu Park Stadium
JST (UTC+09)

5 September 1999 24	Sagan Tosu	0-1	Consadole Sapporo	Tosu Stadium
JST (UTC+09)

10 September 1999 25	Kawasaki Frontale	2-0	Consadole Sapporo	Todoroki Athletics Stadium
JST (UTC+09)

15 September 1999 26	Consadole Sapporo	4-0	Ventforet Kofu	Sapporo Atsubetsu Park Stadium
JST (UTC+09)

19 September 1999 27	Omiya Ardija	1-0	Consadole Sapporo	Omiya Football Stadium
JST (UTC+09)

26 September 1999 28	Consadole Sapporo	1-2	Albirex Niigata	Sapporo Atsubetsu Park Stadium
JST (UTC+09)

2 October 1999 29	Oita Trinita	2-0	Consadole Sapporo	Oita Athletic Stadium
JST (UTC+09)

11 October 1999 30	Consadole Sapporo	2-0	Montedio Yamagata	Sapporo Atsubetsu Park Stadium
JST (UTC+09)

17 October 1999 31	FC Tokyo	0-1	Consadole Sapporo	Edogawa Stadium
JST (UTC+09)

24 October 1999 32	Consadole Sapporo	1-0	Sagan Tosu	Sapporo Atsubetsu Park Stadium
JST (UTC+09)

31 October 1999 33	Consadole Sapporo	1-2 (GG) (a.e.t.)	Kawasaki Frontale	Sapporo Atsubetsu Park Stadium
JST (UTC+09)

6 November 1999 34	Ventforet Kofu	0-3	Consadole Sapporo	Kose Sports Park Stadium
JST (UTC+09)

14 November 1999 35	Consadole Sapporo	0-1	Omiya Ardija	Sapporo Atsubetsu Park Stadium
JST (UTC+09)

21 November 1999 36	Vegalta Sendai	1-0	Consadole Sapporo	Sendai Stadium
JST (UTC+09)

=== Emperor's Cup ===
28 November 1999 1st Round	Hannan University	1-2	Consadole Sapporo	Osaka Nagai Second Stadium
JST (UTC+09)

5 December 1999 2nd Round	Consadole Sapporo	3-0	Mind House TC	Muroran Irie Stadium
JST (UTC+09)

12 December 1999 3rd Round	Avispa Fukuoka	1-0	Consadole Sapporo	Hakatanomori Football Stadium
JST (UTC+09)

=== J.League Cup ===
7 April 1999 1st Round-1	Consadole Sapporo	1-0	Avispa Fukuoka	Muroran Irie Stadium
JST (UTC+09)

14 April 1999 1st Round-2	Avispa Fukuoka	3-0 (3-1 agg.)	Consadole Sapporo	Hakatanomori Football Stadium
JST (UTC+09)

== Player statistics ==
No.	Pos.	Nat.	Player	D.o.B. (Age)	Height / Weight	J.League 2		Emperor's Cup		J.League Cup		Total	
No.	Pos.	Nat.	Player	D.o.B. (Age)	Height / Weight	Apps	Goals	Apps	Goals	Apps	Goals	Apps	Goals
1	GK	(Japan)	Yohei Sato	November 22, 1972 (aged 26)	cm / kg	35	0						
2	DF	(Japan)	Ryuji Tabuchi	February 16, 1973 (aged 26)	cm / kg	35	1						
3	DF	(Japan)	Shoji Nonoshita	May 24, 1970 (aged 28)	cm / kg	2	0						
4	DF	(Japan)	Satoshi Kajino	November 9, 1965 (aged 33)	cm / kg	26	0						
5	DF	(Japan)	Yoshihiro Natsuka	October 7, 1969 (aged 29)	cm / kg	32	3						
6	MF	(Japan)	Taijiro Kurita	March 3, 1975 (aged 24)	cm / kg	8	1						
7	MF	(Japan)	Shin Tanada	July 25, 1969 (aged 29)	cm / kg	32	1						
8	MF	(Brazil)	Kleber Romero	February 14, 1976 (aged 23)	cm / kg	1	0						
8	MF	(Brazil)	Biju	September 17, 1974 (aged 24)	cm / kg	19	2						
9	FW	(Brazil)	Ricardinho	January 20, 1979 (aged 20)	cm / kg	5	1						
9	FW	(Brazil)	Dinei	October 27, 1971 (aged 27)	cm / kg	3	0						
10	MF	(Brazil)	Assis	January 10, 1971 (aged 28)	cm / kg	29	8						
11	FW	(Japan)	Koji Seki	June 26, 1972 (aged 26)	cm / kg	25	6						
12	GK	(Japan)	Ryuji Kato	December 24, 1969 (aged 29)	cm / kg	0	0						
13	FW	(Japan)	Tomotaka Fukagawa	July 24, 1972 (aged 26)	cm / kg	36	5						
14	DF	(Japan)	Tsuyoshi Furukawa	September 21, 1972 (aged 26)	cm / kg	31	1						
15	DF	(Japan)	Tatsuya Murata	August 8, 1972 (aged 26)	cm / kg	30	0						
16	FW	(Japan)	Kenji Kikawada	October 28, 1974 (aged 24)	cm / kg	21	0						
17	MF	(Japan)	Hiromasa Suguri	July 29, 1976 (aged 22)	cm / kg	25	3						
18	FW	(Japan)	Kota Yoshihara	February 2, 1978 (aged 21)	cm / kg	32	15						
19	MF	(Japan)	Hiromasa Tokioka	June 24, 1974 (aged 24)	cm / kg	0	0						
20	DF	(Japan)	Yoshifumi Ono	May 22, 1978 (aged 20)	cm / kg	23	2						
21	GK	(Japan)	Yosuke Fujigaya	February 13, 1981 (aged 18)	cm / kg	2	0						
22	DF	(Japan)	Tomohiko Ikeuchi	November 1, 1977 (aged 21)	cm / kg	7	2						
23	MF	(Japan)	Ippei Saga	May 20, 1980 (aged 18)	cm / kg	4	0						
24	FW	(Japan)	Yu Kawamura	December 1, 1980 (aged 18)	cm / kg	11	0						
25	MF	(Japan)	Naohiko Okada	December 30, 1978 (aged 20)	cm / kg	0	0						
26	FW	(Japan)	Takashi Sakurai	May 4, 1977 (aged 21)	cm / kg	4	0						
27	DF	(Japan)	Jun Ideguchi	May 14, 1979 (aged 19)	cm / kg	1	0						
28	FW	(Japan)	Kohei Hayashi	June 27, 1978 (aged 20)	cm / kg	2	0						

== Other pages ==
- (in Japanese) J. League official site
