= Nobuhito =

- Gender: Male

Origin
- Origin: Japanese
- Meaning: Different meanings depending on the kanji used

Nobuhito (written: 信人 or 伸人) is a masculine Japanese given name. Notable people with the name include:

- Nobuhito, Prince Takamatsu (1905–1987), Japanese prince, third son of Emperor Taishō
- Nobuhito Sato (佐藤 信人; born 1970), Japanese golfer
- Nobuhito Toriizuka (鳥居塚 伸人; born 1972), Japanese footballer
