= Kichise =

Kichise (written: 吉瀬) is a Japanese surname. Notable people with the surname include:

- Hiroshi Kichise (吉瀬 広志, born 1983), Japanese footballer
- Michiko Kichise (吉瀬 美智子, born 1975), Japanese actress and model
