= Kikawada =

Kikawada (written: 黄川田) is a Japanese surname. Notable people with the surname include:

- Kenji Kikawada (黄川田 賢司, born 1974), Japanese footballer
- Masaya Kikawada (黄川田 将也, born 1980), Japanese actor
- Toru Kikawada (黄川田 徹, born 1953), Japanese politician
