= Ryuji Tabuchi =

Japanese footballer

Ryuji Tabuchi 田渕 龍二
Personal information
- Full name: Ryuji Tabuchi
- Date of birth: February 16, 1973 (age 53)
- Place of birth: Tokushima, Japan
- Height: 1.70 m (5 ft 7 in)
- Position: Defender

Youth career
- 1988–1990: Tokushima Commercial High School

Senior career*
Years	Team	Apps	(Gls)
1991–1996	Otsuka Pharmaceutical	113	(2)
1997–2002	Consadole Sapporo	170	(3)
2003	Vissel Kobe	13	(0)
Total		296	(5)
- * Club domestic league appearances and goals

Ryuji Tabuchi (田渕 龍二, Tabuchi Ryuji; born February 16, 1973) is a former Japanese football player.

== Playing career ==
Tabuchi was born in Tokushima Prefecture on February 16, 1973. After graduating from high school, he joined his local club Otsuka Pharmaceutical in 1991. He became a regular player as right side back from first season. However his opportunity to play decreased from 1995. In 1997, he moved to Japan Football League club Consadole Sapporo. He became a regular player and the club won the champions in 1997 and was promoted to J1 League from 1998. Although he played as regular player until 2001, his opportunity to play decreased behind Naoki Sakai and Yoshihiro Nishida in 2002. In 2003, he moved to Vissel Kobe. He retired at the end of the 2003 season.

== Club statistics ==
Club performance			League		Cup		League Cup		Total	
Season	Club	League	Apps	Goals	Apps	Goals	Apps	Goals	Apps	Goals
Japan			League		Emperor's Cup		J.League Cup		Total	
1991/92	Otsuka Pharmaceutical	JSL Division 2	29	0			1	0	30	0
1992	Otsuka Pharmaceutical	Football League	15	0	0	0	-		15	0
1993	Otsuka Pharmaceutical	Football League	9	1	1	0	-		10	1
1994	Otsuka Pharmaceutical	Football League	27	1	1	0	-		28	1
1995	Otsuka Pharmaceutical	Football League	14	0	0	0	-		14	0
1996	Otsuka Pharmaceutical	Football League	19	0	3	0	-		22	0
1997	Consadole Sapporo	Football League	29	1	3	0	6	0	38	1
1998	Consadole Sapporo	J1 League	31	0	3	0	4	0	38	0
1999	Consadole Sapporo	J2 League	35	1	3	0	2	0	40	1
2000	Consadole Sapporo	J2 League	36	1	3	0	2	0	41	1
2001	Consadole Sapporo	J1 League	29	0	0	0	2	0	31	0
2002	Consadole Sapporo	J1 League	10	0	0	0	6	0	16	0
2003	Vissel Kobe	J1 League	13	0	0	0	3	0	16	0
Total			296	5	17	0	26	0	339	5
