= Hiromasa Suguri =

Japanese footballer (born 1976)

Hiromasa Suguri 村主 博正
Personal information
- Full name: Hiromasa Suguri
- Date of birth: 29 July 1976 (age 50)
- Place of birth: Fukuroi, Shizuoka, Japan
- Height: 1.76 m (5 ft 9 in)
- Position: Midfielder

Youth career
- 1992–1994: Iwata Higashi High School

Senior career*
Years	Team	Apps	(Gls)
1995–1997	Honda	56	(8)
1998–2000	Consadole Sapporo	49	(4)
2000	Verdy Kawasaki	3	(0)
2001–2002	Omiya Ardija	20	(1)
2003–2007	Sagan Tosu	95	(4)
2005	→Avispa Fukuoka (loan)	8	(0)
Total		231	(17)

Managerial career
- 2022–2023: Iwaki FC
- 2026–: Kagoshima United FC
- * Club domestic league appearances and goals

Hiromasa Suguri (村主 博正, Suguri Hiromasa; born July 29, 1976) is a Japanese former football player. He was most recently the manager of J2 League club of Iwaki FC until 14 June 2023.

== Playing career ==
Suguri was born in Fukuroi on 29 July 1976. After graduating from high school, he joined Japan Football League club Honda in 1995. He played many matches as a midfielder from first season and the club won the championship in 1996. In 1998, he moved to the newly-promoted J1 League club, Consadole Sapporo. Although he played many matches in 1998, the club was relegated to the J2 League from 1999. In June 2000, he moved to Verdy Kawasaki. However, he hardly played. In 2001, he moved to the J2 club Omiya Ardija. Although he played in two seasons, he did not play many matches. In 2003, he moved to Sagan Tosu. He played many matches as a substitute in three seasons. In September 2005, he moved to Avispa Fukuoka on loan. He played many matches as a substitute and won the second place and was promoted to J1 at the end of 2005. In 2006, he returned to Sagan Tosu and retired at the end of the 2007 season.

== Managerial career ==
Suguri was obtained the Japan Football Association official S-Class coach license in 2021.

On 9 December 2021, Suguri appointed Iwaki FC manager ahead for J3 League from next season.

On 6 November 2022, Suguri brought Iwaki FC promotion to the J2 League for the first time in history starting next season and they were crowned J3 League champions for the first time in their history. But, On 14 June 2023, Suguri is poor performance and contract with Iwaki FC was cancelled.

== Club statistics ==
Club performance			League		Cup		League Cup		Total	
Season	Club	League	Apps	Goals	Apps	Goals	Apps	Goals	Apps	Goals
Japan			League		Emperor's Cup		J.League Cup		Total	
1995	Honda	Football League	13	0					13	0
1996	Honda	Football League	25	4					25	4
1997	Honda	Football League	18	4					18	4
1998	Consadole Sapporo	J1 League	20	1	3	0	1	0	24	1
1999	Consadole Sapporo	J2 League	25	3	2	0	1	0	28	3
2000	Consadole Sapporo	J2 League	4	0	0	0	1	0	5	0
2000	Verdy Kawasaki	J1 League	3	0	0	0	2	0	5	0
2001	Omiya Ardija	J2 League	10	0	0	0	0	0	10	0
2002	Omiya Ardija	J2 League	10	1	0	0	-		10	1
2003	Sagan Tosu	J2 League	17	0	1	0	-		18	0
2004	Sagan Tosu	J2 League	25	1	1	0	-		26	1
2005	Sagan Tosu	J2 League	17	2	0	0	-		17	2
2005	Avispa Fukuoka	J2 League	8	0	1	0	-		9	0
2006	Sagan Tosu	J2 League	14	1	0	0	-		14	1
2007	Sagan Tosu	J2 League	22	0	0	0	-		22	0
Career total			231	17	5	0	8	0	244	17

== Managerial statistics ==
As of 14 June 2023.

Managerial record by club and tenure
Team	From	To	Record				
Team	From	To	G	W	D	L	Win %
Iwaki FC	9 December 2021	14 June 2023	54	26	11	17	48.15
Total			54	26	11	17	48.15

== Honours ==
=== Manager ===
Iwaki FC

- J3 League : 2022
