= Tatsunori Arai =

Japanese footballer (born 1983)

Tatsunori Arai 新居 辰基
Personal information
- Full name: Tatsunori Arai
- Date of birth: December 22, 1983 (age 42)
- Place of birth: Tobetsu, Hokkaido, Japan
- Height: 1.72 m (5 ft 7 1/2 in)
- Position: Forward

Youth career
- 1999–2001: Consadole Sapporo

Senior career*
Years	Team	Apps	(Gls)
2002–2004	Consadole Sapporo	67	(8)
2004	Shizuoka FC		
2005–2006	Sagan Tosu	75	(40)
2007–2009	JEF United Chiba	72	(10)
2010	Shonan Bellmare	17	(0)
2011	Sagan Tosu	12	(1)
Total		243	(59)
- * Club domestic league appearances and goals

Tatsunori Arai (新居 辰基, Arai Tatsunori; born December 22, 1983) is a Japanese former football player.

== Early life ==
Arai was born in Tobetsu, Hokkaido on December 22, 1983. He played youth football for Hokkaido Consadole Sapporo.

== Playing career ==
He joined the J1 League club Consadole Sapporo from his youth team in 2002. He debuted in April and played several matches as forward in 2002. However Consadole finished in last place in the 2002 season and was relegated to the J2 League. He played many matches as substitute forward in 2003.

In October 2004, he joined the Regional Leagues club Shizuoka FC.

In 2005, he moved to the J2 club Sagan Tosu. He became a regular forward and became a top scorer in 2005 and 2006.

In 2007, he moved to the J1 club JEF United Chiba. He played often over three seasons. However did not score many goals and JEF United was relegated to the J2 league at the end of the 2009 season.

In 2010, he moved to the newly promoted J1 club, Shonan Bellmare. He made his debut for Shonan against Montedio Yamagata on 6 March 2010.

In 2011, he moved to the J2 club Sagan Tosu for the first time in five years. He retired at the end of the 2011 season.

== Personal life ==
He was arrested, along with teammate Koji Nakao, for driving under the influence and was dismissed with Nakao in August.

== Club statistics ==
Club performance			League		Cup		League Cup		Total	
Season	Club	League	Apps	Goals	Apps	Goals	Apps	Goals	Apps	Goals
Japan			League		Emperor's Cup		J.League Cup		Total	
2002	Consadole Sapporo	J1 League	5	2	1	0	3	0	9	2
2003	Consadole Sapporo	J2 League	35	3	0	0	-		35	3
2004	Consadole Sapporo	J2 League	27	3	0	0	-		27	3
2004	Shizuoka FC	Regional Leagues								
2005	Sagan Tosu	J2 League	39	17	2	1	-		41	18
2006	Sagan Tosu	J2 League	36	23	1	0	-		37	23
2007	JEF United Chiba	J1 League	25	5	1	0	5	0	31	5
2008	JEF United Chiba	J1 League	23	3	1	0	5	2	29	5
2009	JEF United Chiba	J1 League	24	2	3	1	4	1	31	4
2010	Shonan Bellmare	J1 League	17	0	1	1	3	0	21	1
2011	Sagan Tosu	J2 League	12	1	1	1	-		13	2
Career total			243	59	11	4	20	3	274	66
