= Tsuyoshi Furukawa =

Japanese footballer

Tsuyoshi Furukawa 古川 毅
Personal information
- Full name: Tsuyoshi Furukawa
- Date of birth: September 21, 1972 (age 54)
- Place of birth: Gonohe, Aomori, Japan
- Height: 1.80 m (5 ft 11 in)
- Position: Defender

Youth career
- 1988–1990: Gonohe High School
- 1991–1994: Sendai University

Senior career*
Years	Team	Apps	(Gls)
1995–1996	Otsuka Pharmaceutical	58	(2)
1997–2002	Consadole Sapporo	119	(1)
2003–2004	Montedio Yamagata	61	(1)
Total		238	(4)
- * Club domestic league appearances and goals

Tsuyoshi Furukawa (古川 毅, Furukawa Tsuyoshi; born September 21, 1972) is a Japanese football coach and former player in the J1 League. In 2022, he became head coach for Tokushima Vortis, where he started his career as a player.

== Playing career ==
Furukawa was born in Gonohe, Aomori on September 21, 1972. After graduating from Sendai University, he joined Japan Football League (JFL) club Otsuka Pharmaceutical in 1995. He played as a regular center back from first season. In 1997, he moved to JFL club Consadole Sapporo. The club won second place in 1997 and was promoted to the J1 League from 1998. Although he played many matches in 1998, the club was relegated to the J2 League from 1999. In 1999, he played as a regular player and the club won the championship in 2000 and was promoted to J1 in 2001 again. However, his playing opportunities decreased starting in 2001. In 2003, he moved to J2 club Montedio Yamagata. He played as a regular player and retired at the end of the 2004 season.

== Career statistics ==
Appearances and goals by club, season and competition
Club	Season	League			Emperor's Cup		J.League Cup		Total	
Club	Season	Division	Apps	Goals	Apps	Goals	Apps	Goals	Apps	Goals
Otsuka Pharmaceutical	1995	Football League	28	0	1	0	—		29	0
Otsuka Pharmaceutical	1996	Football League	30	2	4	1	—		34	3
Consadole Sapporo	1997	Football League	11	0	3	0	2	0	16	0
Consadole Sapporo	1998	J1 League	22	0	2	0	4	1	28	1
Consadole Sapporo	1999	J2 League	31	1	3	0	2	0	36	1
Consadole Sapporo	2000	J2 League	26	0	3	0	2	0	31	0
Consadole Sapporo	2001	J1 League	13	0	1	0	1	0	15	0
Consadole Sapporo	2002	J1 League	16	0	0	0	6	0	22	0
Montedio Yamagata	2003	J2 League	39	0	3	1	—		42	1
Montedio Yamagata	2004	J2 League	22	1	0	0	—		22	1
Career total			238	4	20	2	17	1	275	7
