= Tomokazu Hirama =

Japanese footballer

Tomokazu Hirama 平間 智和
Personal information
- Full name: Tomokazu Hirama
- Date of birth: June 30, 1977 (age 49)
- Place of birth: Shibata, Miyagi, Japan
- Height: 1.72 m (5 ft 7 1/2 in)
- Position: Midfielder

Youth career
- 1993–1995: Tohoku High School

Senior career*
Years	Team	Apps	(Gls)
1996–2001	Yokohama F. Marinos	47	(4)
1999	→Montedio Yamagata (loan)	35	(5)
2000	→Vegalta Sendai (loan)	35	(7)
2002–2003	Consadole Sapporo	23	(0)
2004	Albirex Niigata	1	(0)
2005	FC Horikoshi	26	(3)
2006–2007	Sony Sendai	54	(6)
Total		221	(25)
Medal record
Yokohama F. Marinos
Winner	J.League Cup	2001
- * Club domestic league appearances and goals

Tomokazu Hirama (平間 智和, Hirama Tomokazu; born June 30, 1977) is a Japanese former football player.

== Playing career ==
Hirama was born in Shibata, Miyagi, on June 30, 1977. After graduating from high school, he joined the J1 League club Yokohama Marinos (later Yokohama F. Marinos) in 1996. He played many matches from the first season. In 1999, he moved to the newly promoted J2 League club, Montedio Yamagata and became a regular player. In 2000, he moved to his local, Vegalta Sendai. Although a regular player until July, he played many matches as a substitute from July. In 2001, he returned to Yokohama F. Marinos. He played many matches and the club won the champions 2001 J.League Cup. In 2002, he moved to Consadole Sapporo. The club was relegated to J2 from 2003 and his opportunity to play decreased in the 2003 season. In 2004, he moved to Albirex Niigata but hardly played. In 2005, he moved to the Japan Football League (JFL) club FC Horikoshi and, in 2006, to the JFL club Sony Sendai in his local. He played in two seasons and retired at the end of the 2007 season.

== Club statistics ==
Club performance			League		Cup		League Cup		Total		
Season	Club	League	Apps	Goals	Apps	Goals	Apps	Goals	Apps	Goals	
Japan			League		Emperor's Cup		League Cup		Total		
1996	Yokohama Marinos	J1 League	5	0	0	0	0	0	5	0	
1997	Yokohama Marinos	J1 League	13	3	2	0	0	0	15	3	
1998	Yokohama Marinos	J1 League	13	0	1	0	1	0	15	0	
1999	Montedio Yamagata	J2 League	35	5	4	0	2	0	41	5	
2000	Vegalta Sendai	J2 League	35	7	0	0	2	0	37	7	
2001	Yokohama F. Marinos	J1 League	16	1	1	0	6	2	23	2	
2002	Consadole Sapporo	J1 League	15	0	1	0	6	0	22	0	
2003	Consadole Sapporo	J2 League	8	0	0	0	-		8	0	
2004	Albirex Niigata	J1 League	1	0	0	0	0	0	1	0	
2005	FC Horikoshi	Football League	26	3	3	1	-		29	4	
2006	Sony Sendai	Football League	31	3	1	1	-		32	4	
2007	Sony Sendai	Football League	23	3	1	0	-		24	3	
Total	Career total			221	25	14	2	17	2	252	29
