= Biju (footballer) =

Brazilian footballer (born 1974)

Personal information
- Full name: Andre Luiz de Souza Silva
- Date of birth: September 17, 1974 (age 52)
- Place of birth: Brazil
- Height: 1.74 m (5 ft 9 in)
- Position: Midfielder

Senior career*
Years	Team	Apps	(Gls)
1996	Goytacaz		
1997	Americano		
1998	União São João		
1999–2002	Consadole Sapporo	102	(10)
2003–2004	Kyoto Purple Sanga	27	(2)
2005	Sagan Tosu	22	(2)
2006	Ventforet Kofu	26	(1)
2007–2008	Mito HollyHock	44	(0)
2009	Zweigen Kanazawa	13	(1)
- * Club domestic league appearances and goals as of 22 January 2009

André Luiz de Souza Silva or simply known as Biju (born September 17, 1974) is a Brazilian former football player. His nickname is "Biju" because it was the name of a vegetable dish he often ate as a child.

After playing professionally in his native Brazil for three years, Biju joined the J2 League at Consadole Sapporo in 1999. In 2002, he moved to Kyoto Purple Sanga, and then Sagan Tosu. From 2006 he played for Ventforet Kofu. He joined Mito mid-season of 2007 on a 6-month contract. He spent his last career at Zweigen Kanazawa in Japanese Regional Leagues.

== Club statistics ==
Club performance			League		Cup		League Cup		Total	
Season	Club	League	Apps	Goals	Apps	Goals	Apps	Goals	Apps	Goals
Japan			League		Emperor's Cup		J.League Cup		Total	
1999	Consadole Sapporo	J2 League	19	2	3	1	0	0	22	3
2000	Consadole Sapporo	J2 League	33	6	4	1	1	0	38	7
2001	Consadole Sapporo	J1 League	24	1	1	0	2	0	27	1
2002	Consadole Sapporo	J1 League	26	1	1	0	0	0	27	1
2003	Kyoto Purple Sanga	J1 League	13	1	1	0	0	0	14	1
2004	Kyoto Purple Sanga	J2 League	14	1	0	0	-		14	1
2005	Sagan Tosu	J2 League	22	2	1	0	-		23	2
2006	Ventforet Kofu	J1 League	26	1	1	1	4	0	31	2
2007	Mito HollyHock	J2 League	22	0	2	0	-		24	0
2008	Mito HollyHock	J2 League	22	0	1	0	-		23	0
2009	Zweigen Kanazawa	Regional Leagues	13	1	2	0	-		15	1
Total			234	16	17	3	7	0	258	19

== Personal life ==
- Biju's wife is Japanese.
