= Kensaku Omori =

Japanese footballer

Kensaku Omori 大森 健作
Personal information
- Full name: Kensaku Omori
- Date of birth: November 21, 1975 (age 50)
- Place of birth: Seiyo, Ehime, Japan
- Height: 1.77 m (5 ft 9 1/2 in)
- Position: Defender

Youth career
- 1991–1993: Minamiuwa High School

Senior career*
Years	Team	Apps	(Gls)
1994–1996	Yokohama Marinos	13	(0)
1997	Kashima Antlers	1	(0)
1998–1999	Kyoto Purple Sanga	17	(0)
2000–2004	Consadole Sapporo	123	(1)
2004	Cerezo Osaka	5	(0)
2005–2007	Tokushima Vortis	42	(0)
Total		201	(1)

International career
1995	Japan U-20	3	(0)
Medal record
Yokohama Marinos
Winner	J1 League	1995
Kashima Antlers
Runner-up	J1 League	1997
Winner	J.League Cup	1997
Winner	Emperor's Cup	1997
- * Club domestic league appearances and goals

Kensaku Omori (大森 健作, Ōmori Kensaku; born November 21, 1975) is a former Japanese football player.

== Club career ==
Omori was born in Seiyo on November 21, 1975. After graduating from high school, he joined Yokohama Marinos in 1994. He played for the club until 1996, and he played for Kashima Antlers (1997) and Kyoto Purple Sanga (1998–99). However he could hardly play in the match at both clubs. He moved to Consadole Sapporo in 2000. Although he was originally left side-back, he became a regular player as left stopper of three back defense. He moved to Cerezo Osaka in August 2004. In 2005, he moved to Tokushima Vortis was just promoted to J2 League. He lost his opportunity to play in 2007 and retired at the end of the 2007 season.

== National team career ==
In April 1995, Omori was selected Japan U-20 national team for 1995 World Youth Championship. He played 3 matches as left side midfielder.

== Career statistics ==
Appearances and goals by club, season and competition
Club	Season	League			Emperor's Cup		J.League Cup		Total	
Club	Season	Division	Apps	Goals	Apps	Goals	Apps	Goals	Apps	Goals
Yokohama Marinos	1994	J1 League	1	0	0	0	0	0	1	0
Yokohama Marinos	1995	J1 League	9	0	1	0	—		10	0
Yokohama Marinos	1996	J1 League	3	0	0	0	5	0	8	0
Kashima Antlers	1997	J1 League	1	0	0	0	2	0	3	0
Kyoto Purple Sanga	1998	J1 League	14	0	0	0	3	0	17	0
Kyoto Purple Sanga	1999	J1 League	3	0	0	0	0	0	3	0
Consadole Sapporo	2000	J2 League	38	1	4	0	2	0	44	1
Consadole Sapporo	2001	J1 League	29	0	1	0	2	0	32	0
Consadole Sapporo	2002	J1 League	29	0	0	0	6	0	35	0
Consadole Sapporo	2003	J2 League	14	0	2	0	—		16	0
Consadole Sapporo	2004	J2 League	13	0	0	0	—		13	0
Cerezo Osaka	2004	J1 League	5	0	0	0	0	0	5	0
Tokushima Vortis	2005	J2 League	24	0	2	0	—		26	0
Tokushima Vortis	2006	J2 League	18	0	2	0	—		20	0
Tokushima Vortis	2007	J2 League	0	0	0	0	—		0	0
Career total			201	1	12	0	20	0	233	1
