= Almir (footballer, born 1973) =

Brazilian footballer

Personal information
- Full name: Almir Moraes Andrade
- Date of birth: May 11, 1973 (age 53)
- Place of birth: Luminárias, Brazi
- Height: 1.78 m (5 ft 10 in)
- Position: Midfielder

Senior career*
Years	Team	Apps	(Gls)
1994	Atlético Paranaense		
1995–1996	Otsuka Pharmaceutical		
1997	Palmeiras		
1997	Goiás		
1998	América Cali		
1998	Otsuka Pharmaceutical		
1999	FC Tokyo		
2000–2001	Consadole Sapporo		
2002	América-SP		
2003	Coritiba		

Managerial career
- Arena Lyon
- * Club domestic league appearances and goals

Almir Moraes Andrade (born May 11, 1973) is a former Brazilian football player.

== Club statistics ==
Club performance			League		Cup		League Cup		Total	
Season	Club	League	Apps	Goals	Apps	Goals	Apps	Goals	Apps	Goals
Japan			League		Emperor's Cup		J.League Cup		Total	
1995	Otsuka Pharmaceutical	Football League	21	3	1	0	-		22	3
1996	Otsuka Pharmaceutical	Football League	18	3	1	0	-		19	3
1998	Otsuka Pharmaceutical	Football League	20	4	3	1	-		23	5
1999	FC Tokyo	J2 League	33	8	4	4	6	0	43	12
2000	Consadole Sapporo	J2 League	40	1	3	1	2	0	45	2
2001	Consadole Sapporo	J1 League	14	0	0	0	1	0	15	0
Total			166	19	12	6	9	0	187	25
