= Gakuya Horii =

Japanese footballer (born 1975)

Gakuya Horii 堀井 岳也
Personal information
- Full name: Gakuya Horii
- Date of birth: July 3, 1975 (age 51)
- Place of birth: Kofu, Yamanashi, Japan
- Height: 1.75 m (5 ft 9 in)
- Position: Forward

Youth career
- 1991–1993: Nirasaki High School
- 1994–1997: Aoyama Gakuin University

Senior career*
Years	Team	Apps	(Gls)
1998–1999	Ventforet Kofu	49	(8)
2000–2001	Montedio Yamagata	66	(17)
2001–2005	Consadole Sapporo	105	(13)
2006	Ventforet Kofu	16	(1)
Total		236	(39)
- * Club domestic league appearances and goals

Gakuya Horii (堀井 岳也, Horii Gakuya; born July 3, 1975) is a former Japanese football player.

== Playing career ==
Horii was born in Kofu on July 3, 1975. After graduating from Aoyama Gakuin University, he joined Japan Football League club Ventforet Kofu based in his local in 1998. He played many matches as forward from first season and the club was promoted to new league J2 League from 1999. In 1999, although he played as regular player, the club finished at bottom place. In 2000, he moved to J2 club Montedio Yamagata. He played many matches in 2 seasons and scored 10 goals in 2001. In September 2001, he moved to J1 League club Consadole Sapporo. Although he played many matches until 2002, the club was relegated to J2 from 2003. From 2003, he became a regular player and played many matches until 2004. However his opportunity to play decreased in 2005. In 2006, he moved to newly was promoted to J1 club, Ventforet Kofu for the first time in 7 years. He retired end of 2006 season.

== Career statistics ==
Appearances and goals by club, season and competition
Club	Season	League			Emperor's Cup		J.League Cup		Total	
Club	Season	Division	Apps	Goals	Apps	Goals	Apps	Goals	Apps	Goals
Ventforet Kofu	1998	Football League	15	1	2	0	—		17	1
Ventforet Kofu	1999	J2 League	34	7	2	2	2	1	38	10
Montedio Yamagata	2000	J2 League	35	7	2	3	1	0	38	10
Montedio Yamagata	2001	J2 League	31	10	0	0	2	1	33	11
Consadole Sapporo	2001	J1 League	6	1	0	0	0	0	6	1
Consadole Sapporo	2002	J1 League	14	1	1	0	5	0	20	1
Consadole Sapporo	2003	J2 League	41	8	3	2	—		44	10
Consadole Sapporo	2004	J2 League	33	1	4	2	—		37	3
Consadole Sapporo	2005	J2 League	11	2	0	0	—		11	2
Ventforet Kofu	2006	J1 League	16	1	0	0	3	0	19	1
Career total			236	39	14	9	13	2	263	50
