= Yu Kawamura =

Japanese footballer (born 1980)

Yu Kawamura 河村 優
Personal information
- Full name: Yu Kawamura
- Date of birth: December 1, 1980 (age 45)
- Place of birth: Yaizu, Shizuoka, Japan
- Height: 1.70 m (5 ft 7 in)
- Position: Midfielder

Youth career
- 1996–1998: Fujieda Higashi High School

Senior career*
Years	Team	Apps	(Gls)
1999–2003	Consadole Sapporo	14	(0)
2001	→Mito HollyHock (loan)	40	(3)
2002	→Avispa Fukuoka (loan)	8	(1)
2004	Okinawa Kariyushi FC		
2005–2009	Shizuoka FC		
Total		62	(4)
- * Club domestic league appearances and goals

Yu Kawamura (河村 優, Kawamura Yu; born December 1, 1980) is a former Japanese football player.

== Playing career ==
Kawamura was born in Yaizu on December 1, 1980. After graduating from high school, he joined the J2 League club Consadole Sapporo in 1999. Although he played for two seasons, he was not in many matches. In 2001, he moved to Mito HollyHock on loan. He became a regular player and played often as offensive midfielder. In 2002, he moved to Avispa Fukuoka on loan. However he did not play much. In 2003, he returned to Consadole Sapporo, but he rarely played in a match. In 2004, he played for the Regional Leagues club Okinawa Kariyushi FC (2004) and Shizuoka FC (2005–07). He retired at the end of the 2007 season.

== Career statistics ==
Appearances and goals by club, season and competition
Club	Season	League			Emperor's Cup		J.League Cup		Total	
Club	Season	Division	Apps	Goals	Apps	Goals	Apps	Goals	Apps	Goals
Consadole Sapporo	1999	J2 League	11	0	0	0	2	0	13	0
Consadole Sapporo	2000	J2 League	2	0	2	0	1	0	5	0
Mito HollyHock	2001	J2 League	40	3	1	0	2	1	43	4
Avispa Fukuoka	2002	J2 League	8	1	0	0	—		8	1
Consadole Sapporo	2003	J2 League	1	0	0	0	—		1	0
Career total			62	4	3	0	5	1	70	5
