= Yuzuki Ito =

Japanese footballer

Yuzuki Ito 伊藤 優津樹
Personal information
- Full name: Yuzuki Ito
- Date of birth: April 7, 1974 (age 52)
- Place of birth: Shizuoka, Japan
- Height: 1.73 m (5 ft 8 in)
- Position: Midfielder

Youth career
- 1990–1992: Shizuoka Kita High School

Senior career*
Years	Team	Apps	(Gls)
1993–1997	Shimizu S-Pulse	42	(0)
1998–2004	Kawasaki Frontale	18	(3)
2000–2001	→Consadole Sapporo (loan)	47	(1)
Total		107	(4)
Medal record
Shimizu S-Pulse
Winner	J.League Cup	1996
Runner-up	J.League Cup	1993
- * Club domestic league appearances and goals

Yuzuki Ito (伊藤 優津樹, Itō Yuzuki; born April 7, 1974) is a former Japanese football player.

== Playing career ==
Ito was born in Shizuoka Prefecture on April 7, 1974. After graduating from high school, he joined his local club Shimizu S-Pulse in 1993. He debuted in 1994 and played often as left midfielder from 1995 onward. In 1998, he moved to the Japan Football League club Kawasaki Frontale. The club was promoted to the J2 League in 1999 and won the championship in 1999, but he was not playing as frequently. In 2000, he moved to the J2 club Consadole Sapporo on loan. He played as a regular left midfielder and the club won the championship and was promoted to the J1 League. However his opportunity to play decreased after injury in 2001. In 2002, he returned to Kawasaki Frontale. He did not play much and retired at the end of the 2004 season.

== Club statistics ==
Club performance			League		Cup		League Cup		Total	
Season	Club	League	Apps	Goals	Apps	Goals	Apps	Goals	Apps	Goals
Japan			League		Emperor's Cup		League Cup		Total	
1993	Shimizu S-Pulse	J1 League	0	0	0	0	0	0	0	0
1994	Shimizu S-Pulse	J1 League	5	0	1	0	0	0	6	0
1995	Shimizu S-Pulse	J1 League	18	0	1	0	-		19	0
1996	Shimizu S-Pulse	J1 League	13	0	0	0	0	0	13	0
1997	Shimizu S-Pulse	J1 League	6	0	0	0	4	0	10	0
1998	Kawasaki Frontale	Football League	2	1	0	0	2	0	4	1
1999	Kawasaki Frontale	J2 League	2	0	0	0	1	0	3	0
2000	Consadole Sapporo	J2 League	33	0	1	1	1	0	35	1
2001	Consadole Sapporo	J1 League	14	1	1	0	2	0	17	1
2002	Kawasaki Frontale	J2 League	4	2	0	0	-		4	2
2003	Kawasaki Frontale	J2 League	10	0	1	0	-		11	0
2004	Kawasaki Frontale	J2 League	0	0	0	0	-		0	0
Career total			107	4	5	0	10	0	122	4
