= Tomohiro Wanami =

Japanese footballer

Tomohiro Wanami 和波 智広
Personal information
- Full name: Tomohiro Wanami
- Date of birth: April 27, 1980 (age 46)
- Place of birth: Inabe, Mie, Japan
- Height: 1.75 m (5 ft 9 in)
- Position: Midfielder

Team information
- Current team: Veertien Mie
- Number: 7

Youth career
- 1996–1998: Akatsuki High School

Senior career*
Years	Team	Apps	(Gls)
1999–2000	Shonan Bellmare	52	(4)
2001–2007	Consadole Sapporo	174	(7)
2004	→ Vissel Kobe (loan)	0	(0)
2013–	Veertien Mie		
Total		226	(11)
- * Club domestic league appearances and goals

Tomohiro Wanami (和波 智広, Wanami Tomohiro; born April 27, 1980) is a Japanese football player. He plays for Veertien Mie.

== Playing career ==
Wanami was born in Inabe on April 27, 1980. After graduating from high school, he joined J1 League club Bellmare Hiratsuka (later Shonan Bellmare) in 1999. He became a regular player as left side midfielder in the middle of 1999. However the club was relegated to J2 League from 2000. In 2001, he moved to newly was promoted to J1 club, Consadole Sapporo. He played many matches as left side midfielder. However the club was relegated to J2 from 2003. In 2004, he moved to Vissel Kobe on loan. However he could not play at all in the match for injury. In May 2004, he returned to Consadole Sapporo. He played as regular player until 2005. However his opportunity to play decreased from 2006 and he retired end of 2007 season. In 2013, he came back as player at his local club Veertien Kuwana (later Veertien Mie) in Prefectural Leagues. The club was promoted to Regional Leagues from 2015 and Japan Football League from 2017.

== Career statistics ==
Appearances and goals by club, season and competition
Club	Season	League			Emperor's Cup		J.League Cup		Total	
Club	Season	Division	Apps	Goals	Apps	Goals	Apps	Goals	Apps	Goals
Bellmare Hiratsuka	1999	J1 League	17	1	1	0	1	0	19	1
Shonan Bellmare	2000	J2 League	35	3	3	0	1	0	39	3
Consadole Sapporo	2001	J1 League	20	2	1	0	1	0	22	2
Consadole Sapporo	2002	J1 League	25	0	0	0	2	1	27	1
Consadole Sapporo	2003	J2 League	35	4	3	1	—		38	5
Vissel Kobe	2004	J1 League	0	0	0	0	0	0	0	0
Consadole Sapporo	2004	J2 League	33	0	4	0	—		37	0
Consadole Sapporo	2005	J2 League	38	1	1	0	—		39	1
Consadole Sapporo	2006	J2 League	21	0	2	0	—		23	0
Consadole Sapporo	2007	J2 League	2	0	0	0	—		2	0
Career total			226	11	15	1	5	1	246	13
