= Dinei (footballer, born 1971) =

Brazilian footballer

Personal information
- Full name: Valdinei Rocha de Oliveira
- Date of birth: October 27, 1971 (age 55)
- Place of birth: Brazil
- Height: 1.68 m (5 ft 6 in)
- Position: Forward

Senior career*
Years	Team	Apps	(Gls)
1999	Consadole Sapporo	3	(0)
- * Club domestic league appearances and goals

Valdinei Rocha de Oliveira (born October 27, 1971) is a former Brazilian football player.

== Career statistics ==
Appearances and goals by club, season and competition
Club	Season	League			Emperor's Cup		J.League Cup		Total	
Club	Season	Division	Apps	Goals	Apps	Goals	Apps	Goals	Apps	Goals
Consadole Sapporo	1999	J2 League	3	0	0	0	0	0	3	0
Career total			3	0	0	0	0	0	3	0
