= Tomotaka Fukagawa =

Japanese footballer

Tomotaka Fukagawa 深川 友貴
Personal information
- Full name: Tomotaka Fukagawa
- Date of birth: July 24, 1972 (age 54)
- Place of birth: Muroran, Hokkaido, Japan
- Height: 1.80 m (5 ft 11 in)
- Position: Forward

Youth career
- 1988–1990: Muroran Otani High School
- 1991–1994: Kokushikan University

Senior career*
Years	Team	Apps	(Gls)
1995–1997	Cerezo Osaka	58	(7)
1998–2001	Consadole Sapporo	84	(8)
2002	Mito HollyHock	17	(0)
Total		159	(15)
- * Club domestic league appearances and goals

Tomotaka Fukagawa (深川 友貴, Fukagawa Tomotaka; born July 24, 1972) is a former Japanese football player.

== Playing career ==
Fukagawa was born in Muroran on July 24, 1972. After graduating from Kokushikan University, he joined newly was promoted to J1 League club, Cerezo Osaka in 1995. He played many matches as forward from first season. In 1998, he moved to newly was promoted to J1 League club, Consadole Sapporo based in his local. Although he played many matches until 1999, his opportunity to play decreased for injury from 2000. In 2002, he moved to Mito HollyHock. He retired end of 2002 season.

== Career statistics ==
Appearances and goals by club, season and competition
Club	Season	League			Emperor's Cup		J.League Cup		Total	
Club	Season	Division	Apps	Goals	Apps	Goals	Apps	Goals	Apps	Goals
Cerezo Osaka	1995	J1 League	23	3	2	1	—		25	4
Cerezo Osaka	1996	J1 League	17	1	1	1	3	0	21	2
Cerezo Osaka	1997	J1 League	18	3	0	0	6	1	24	4
Consadole Sapporo	1998	J1 League	24	2	3	1	0	0	27	3
Consadole Sapporo	1999	J2 League	36	5	3	1	2	1	41	7
Consadole Sapporo	2000	J2 League	13	1	2	0	2	0	17	1
Consadole Sapporo	2001	J1 League	11	0	0	0	1	0	12	0
Mito HollyHock	2002	J2 League	17	0	2	0	—		19	0
Career total			159	15	13	4	14	2	186	21
