= Koji Nakao =

Japanese footballer

Koji Nakao 中尾 康二
Personal information
- Full name: Koji Nakao
- Date of birth: 8 September 1981 (age 45)
- Place of birth: Kimotsuki, Kagoshima, Japan
- Height: 1.71 m (5 ft 7 1/2 in)
- Position: Midfielder

Youth career
- 1997–1999: Yokkaichi Chuo Technical High School

Senior career*
| Years | Team | Apps | (Gls) |
| 2000–2004 | Consadole Sapporo | 48 | (0) |
| 2002 | →Yokohama FC (loan) | 7 | (0) |
| 2004–2005 | Shizuoka FC | | |
| 2006–2007 | FC Gifu | 27 | (2) |
| 2008–2010 | Azul Claro Numazu | | |
| Total | | 82 | (2) |
- * Club domestic league appearances and goals

Koji Nakao (中尾 康二, Nakao Kōji; born 8 September 1981) is a former Japanese football player.

== Playing career ==
Nakao was born in Kimotsuki District, Kagoshima on 8 September 1981. After graduating from high school, he joined J2 League club Consadole Sapporo in 2000. On 23 April, he debuted as substitute midfielder from the 77th minute against Montedio Yamagata. Although the club was promoted to J1 League from 2001, he could hardly play in the match until 2002. In August 2002, he moved to J2 club Yokohama FC on loan. He played many matches as defensive midfielder. In 2003, he returned to Consadole Sapporo. Although the club was relegated to J2 from 2003, he played many matches as defensive midfielder. However he was arrested with teammate Tatsunori Arai for driving under the influence and was sacked with Arai in August. In August 2004, he moved to Regional Leagues club Shizuoka FC. In 2006, he moved to Regional Leagues club FC Gifu. He played many matches and the club was promoted to Japan Football League from 2007. In 2008, he moved to Prefectural Leagues club Azul Claro Numazu. He retired end of 2010 season.

== Career statistics ==
Appearances and goals by club, season and competition
| Club | Season | League | | | Emperor's Cup | | J.League Cup | | Total | |
| Club | Season | Division | Apps | Goals | Apps | Goals | Apps | Goals | Apps | Goals |
|---|---|---|---|---|---|---|---|---|---|---|
| Consadole Sapporo | 2000 | J2 League | 1 | 0 | 1 | 1 | 0 | 0 | 2 | 1 |
| Consadole Sapporo | 2001 | J1 League | 3 | 0 | 0 | 0 | 0 | 0 | 3 | 0 |
| Consadole Sapporo | 2002 | J1 League | 0 | 0 | 0 | 0 | 4 | 0 | 4 | 0 |
| Yokohama FC | 2002 | J2 League | 7 | 0 | 0 | 0 | - | | 7 | 0 |
| Consadole Sapporo | 2003 | J2 League | 24 | 0 | 0 | 0 | - | | 24 | 0 |
| Consadole Sapporo | 2004 | J2 League | 20 | 0 | 0 | 0 | - | | 20 | 0 |
| Shizuoka FC | 2004 | Regional Leagues | | | | | | | | |
| Shizuoka FC | 2005 | Regional Leagues | | | | | | | | |
| FC Gifu | 2006 | Regional Leagues | 13 | 2 | 3 | 1 | - | | 16 | 3 |
| FC Gifu | 2007 | Football League | 14 | 0 | 0 | 0 | - | | 14 | 0 |
| Career total | | | 82 | 0 | 4 | 2 | 4 | 0 | 90 | 2 |
