= Yoshifumi Ono =

Japanese footballer

Yoshifumi Ono 大野 貴史
Personal information
- Full name: Yoshifumi Ono
- Date of birth: May 22, 1978 (age 48)
- Place of birth: Osaka, Japan
- Height: 1.80 m (5 ft 11 in)
- Position: Defender

Youth career
- 1994–1996: Hatsushiba Hashimoto High School

Senior career*
Years	Team	Apps	(Gls)
1997–2000	Consadole Sapporo	46	(3)
2001–2002	Montedio Yamagata	37	(1)
2003	Shizuoka FC		
2004	Okinawa Kariyushi FC		
2004–2005	Shizuoka FC		
Total		83	(4)
- * Club domestic league appearances and goals

Yoshifumi Ono (大野 貴史, Ono Yoshifumi; born May 22, 1978) is a former Japanese football player.

== Playing career ==
Ono was born in Osaka Prefecture on May 22, 1978. After graduating from high school, he joined Japan Football League club Consadole Sapporo in 1997. Although he could not play at all in the match in 1997, the club won the 2nd place and was promoted to J1 League from 1998. He played many matches as center back from 1998. However the club was relegated to J2 League in a year. In 2000, he could hardly play in the match. In 2001, he moved to Montedio Yamagata. He played many matches in 2 seasons. From 2003, he played for Regional Leagues club Shizuoka FC and Okinawa Kariyushi FC. He retired at the end of the 2005 season.

== Career statistics ==
Appearances and goals by club, season and competition
Club	Season	League			Emperor's Cup		J.League Cup		Total	
Club	Season	Division	Apps	Goals	Apps	Goals	Apps	Goals	Apps	Goals
Consadole Sapporo	1997	Football League	0	0	0	0	0	0	0	0
Consadole Sapporo	1998	J1 League	17	1	2	0	0	0	19	1
Consadole Sapporo	1999	J2 League	23	2	1	0	1	0	25	2
Consadole Sapporo	2000	J2 League	6	0	1	0	0	0	7	0
Montedio Yamagata	2001	J2 League	21	1	2	0	0	0	23	1
Montedio Yamagata	2002	J2 League	16	0	0	0	—		16	0
Career total			83	4	6	0	1	0	90	4
