= Max Sandro =

Brazilian footballer

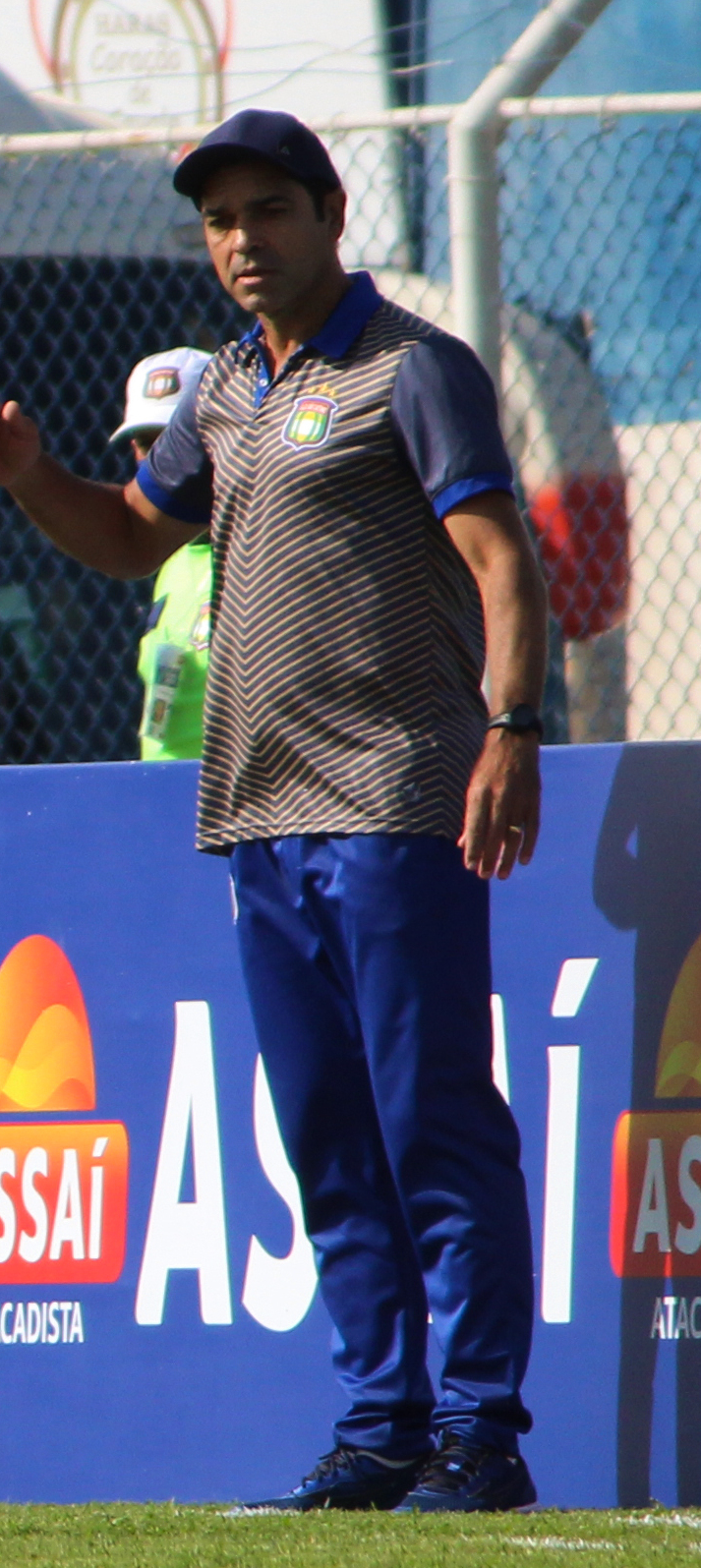
- Max Sandro as head coach of São Caetano in 2021

Personal information
- Full name: Max Sandro Barbosa de Oliveira
- Date of birth: 3 August 1972 (age 54)
- Place of birth: Rio de Janeiro, Brazil
- Height: 1.82 m (5 ft 11 1/2 in)
- Position: Defender

Team information
- Current team: Lemense (head coach)

Senior career*
| Years | Team | Apps | (Gls) |
| 1993–1995 | Americano | | |
| 1996 | Paysandu | | |
| 1997 | União São João | | |
| 1998 | Rio Branco-SP | | |
| 1998 | Ceará | | |
| 1999 | Portuguesa | | |
| 2000 | Botafogo | | |
| 2000 | Juventude | | |
| 2001 | Coritiba | | |
| 2002 | Consadole Sapporo | 3 | (0) |
| 2002 | Náutico | | |
| 2003 | Avaí | | |
| 2004 | Rio Branco-SP | | |
| 2005 | Santo André | | |
| 2006 | Juventus-SP | | |
| 2007–2010 | Audax | | |
| 2007 | → Guarani (loan) | | |

Managerial career
- 2012–2015: Audax U20
- 2016: Palmas
- 2017: Grêmio Osasco
- 2018: Audax
- 2019–2020: Chapecoense U20
- 2020–2021: Audax
- 2021–2022: São Caetano
- 2022: Patrocinense
- 2023: São José-SP
- 2023: Rio Branco-ES
- 2024: SKA Brasil
- 2024–2025: Capixaba
- 2026–: Lemense
- * Club domestic league appearances and goals

Max Sandro Barbosa de Oliveira (born 3 August 1972), known simply as Max Sandro, is a Brazilian football coach and former player. He is the head coach of Lemense.
