= Yōsuke Fujigaya =

Japanese footballer (born 1981)

Yosuke Fujigaya 藤ヶ谷 陽介
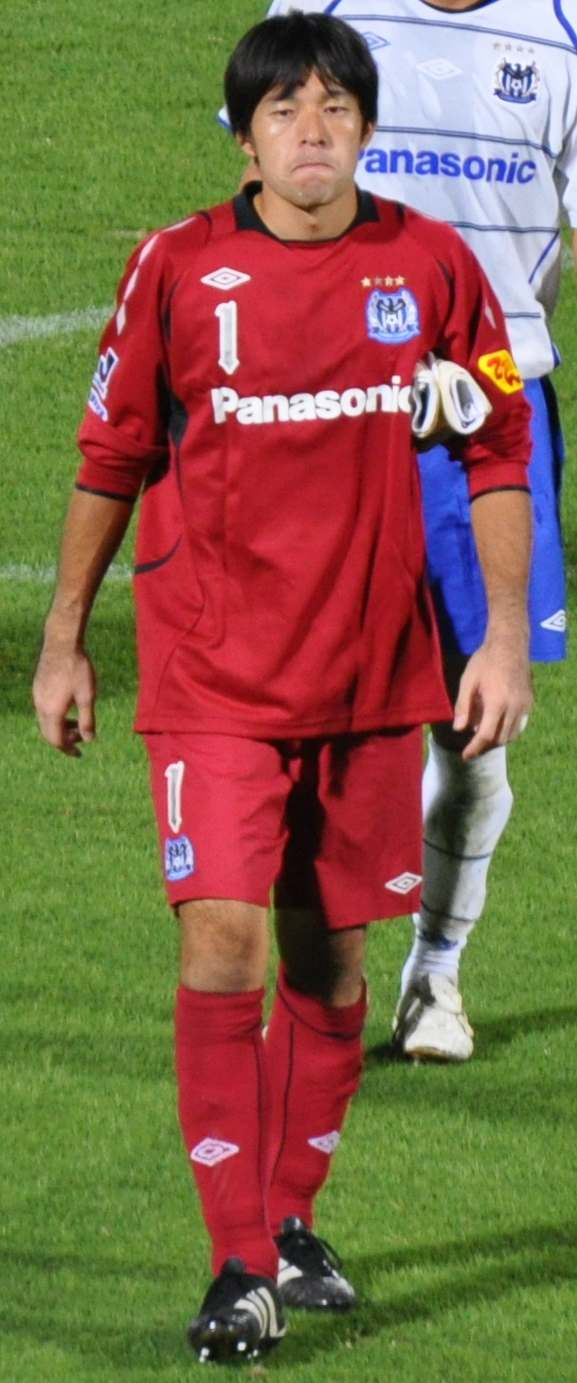
- Fujigaya with Gamba Osaka in 2010

Personal information
- Full name: Yosuke Fujigaya
- Date of birth: 13 February 1981 (age 45)
- Place of birth: Hamamatsu, Japan
- Height: 1.85 m (6 ft 1 in)
- Position: Goalkeeper

Youth career
- 1996–1998: Iwata Higashi High School

Senior career*
Years	Team	Apps	(Gls)
1999–2004	Consadole Sapporo	85	(0)
2005–2013	Gamba Osaka	258	(0)
2014	Júbilo Iwata	8	(0)
2015–2017	Gamba Osaka	2	(0)
2016	→Gamba Osaka U-23 (loan)	4	(0)
Total		357	(0)

International career
2001	Japan U-20	3	(0)
Medal record
Gamba Osaka
Winner	AFC Champions League	2008
Winner	J1 League	2005
Runner-up	J1 League	2010
Runner-up	J1 League	2015
Winner	J.League Cup	2007
Runner-up	J.League Cup	2005
Runner-up	J.League Cup	2015
Runner-up	J.League Cup	2016
Winner	Emperor's Cup	2008
Winner	Emperor's Cup	2009
Winner	Emperor's Cup	2015
Runner-up	Emperor's Cup	2006
Runner-up	Emperor's Cup	2012
Representing Japan
Asian Games
Silver medal – second place	2002 Busan	Team
AFC U-19 Championship
Silver medal – second place	2000 Iran
- * Club domestic league appearances and goals

Yosuke Fujigaya (藤ヶ谷 陽介, Fujigaya Yōsuke; born 13 February 1981) is a former Japanese football player.

== Club career ==
Fujigaya was born in Hamamatsu on 13 February 1981. After graduating from high school, he joined Consadole Sapporo in 1999. He became a regular goalkeeper instead Yohei Sato from 2003. He moved to Gamba Osaka in 2005. He played many matches as regular goalkeeper for a long time. The club won the champions 2005 J1 League, 2007 J.League Cup, 2008 and 2009 Emperor's Cup. In Asia, the club won the champions 2008 AFC Champions League. However the club was relegated to J2 League end of 2012 season. In 2013 season, he played full-time in all matches and the club was promoted to J1 League. However he left the club and moved to his local club Júbilo Iwata in 2014. He returned to Gamba Osaka in 2015. However he could hardly play in the match behind Masaaki Higashiguchi and retired end of 2017 season.

== National team career ==
In June 2001, Fujigaya was elected Japan U-20 national team for 2001 World Youth Championship. At this tournament, he played full-time in all 3 matches.

== Club statistics ==
Club performance			League		Cup		League Cup		Continental		Other^{1}		Total	
Season	Club	League	Apps	Goals	Apps	Goals	Apps	Goals	Apps	Goals	Apps	Goals	Apps	Goals
Japan			League		Emperor's Cup		J.League Cup		Asia				Total	
1999	Consadole Sapporo	J2 League	2	0	0	0	0	0	-		-		2	0
2000	Consadole Sapporo	J2 League	0	0	0	0	0	0	-		-		0	0
2001	Consadole Sapporo	J1 League	1	0	1	0	0	0	-		-		2	0
2002	Consadole Sapporo	J1 League	4	0	0	0	0	0	-		-		4	0
2003	Consadole Sapporo	J2 League	37	0	3	0	-		-		-		40	0
2004	Consadole Sapporo	J2 League	41	0	4	0	-		-		-		45	0
Total			85	0	8	0	0	0	-		-		93	0
2005	Gamba Osaka	J1 League	16	0	2	0	4	0	-		-		22	0
2006	Gamba Osaka	J1 League	26	0	0	0	2	0	6	0	1	0	35	0
2007	Gamba Osaka	J1 League	28	0	4	0	7	0	-		1	0	40	0
2008	Gamba Osaka	J1 League	28	0	5	0	4	0	9	0	-		46	0
2009	Gamba Osaka	J1 League	22	0	4	0	2	0	2	0	1	0	31	0
2010	Gamba Osaka	J1 League	34	0	2	0	2	0	5	0	-		43	0
2011	Gamba Osaka	J1 League	34	0	2	0	2	0	7	0	-		45	0
2012	Gamba Osaka	J1 League	28	0	0	0	1	0	5	0	-		34	0
2013	Gamba Osaka	J2 League	42	0	1	0	-		-		-		43	0
Total			258	0	20	0	24	0	34	0	3	0	337	0
2014	Júbilo Iwata	J2 League	8	0	0	0	-		-		-		8	0
Total			8	0	0	0	-		-		-		8	0
2015	Gamba Osaka	J1 League	1	0	0	0	4	0	0	0	1	0	6	0
2016	Gamba Osaka	J1 League	0	0	2	0	4	0	1	0	0	0	7	0
2017	Gamba Osaka	J1 League	1	0	1	0	4	0	0	0	-		6	0
Total			2	0	3	0	12	0	1	0	1	0	19	0
2016	Gamba Osaka U-23	J3 League	4	0	-		-		-		-		4	0
Total			4	0	-		-		-		-		4	0
Career total			357	0	31	0	36	0	35	0	4	0	463	0

^{1} = Japanese Super Cup and Suruga Bank Championship appearances.

== Honors ==
- AFC Champions League: 2008
- Pan-Pacific Championship: 2008
- J1 League: 2005
- J2 League: 2013
- Emperor's Cup: 2008, 2009, 2015
- J.League Cup: 2007
- Japanese Super Cup - 2015
