= Yoshihiro Nishida =

Japanese footballer

Yoshihiro Nishida 西田 吉洋
Personal information
- Full name: Yoshihiro Nishida
- Date of birth: 30 January 1973 (age 53)
- Place of birth: Ehime, Japan
- Height: 1.78 m (5 ft 10 in)
- Position: Midfielder

Youth career
- 1988–1990: Minamiuwa High School

College career
Years	Team	Apps	(Gls)
1991–1994	Doshisha University		

Senior career*
Years	Team	Apps	(Gls)
1995	Sanfrecce Hiroshima	0	(0)
1996–1997	Kyoto Purple Sanga	47	(1)
1998–1999	Avispa Fukuoka	46	(2)
2000–2002	Tokyo Verdy	41	(2)
2002–2003	Consadole Sapporo	32	(1)
Total		166	(6)
Medal record
Sanfrecce Hiroshima
Runner-up	Emperor's Cup	1995
- * Club domestic league appearances and goals

Yoshihiro Nishida (西田 吉洋, Nishida Yoshihiro; born 30 January 1973) is a former Japanese football player.

== Playing career ==
Nishida was born in Ehime Prefecture on 30 January 1973. After graduating from Doshisha University, he joined Sanfrecce Hiroshima in 1995. Although he was forward, he could not play at all in the match. In 1996, he moved to newly was promoted to J1 League club, Kyoto Purple Sanga. Although he played as forward initially, he was converted to right side midfielder and right side back and became a regular player. In 1998, he moved to Avispa Fukuoka and played many matches in 2 seasons. In 2000, he moved to Verdy Kawasaki (later Tokyo Verdy). Although he played many matches as right side back until 2001, he could hardly play in the match in 2002. In July 2002, he moved to Consadole Sapporo. Although he played as right side midfielder, the club was relegated to J2 League from 2003. He retired end of 2003 season.

== Club statistics ==
Club performance			League		Cup		League Cup		Total	
Season	Club	League	Apps	Goals	Apps	Goals	Apps	Goals	Apps	Goals
Japan			League		Emperor's Cup		J.League Cup		Total	
1995	Sanfrecce Hiroshima	J1 League	0	0	0	0	-		0	0
1996	Kyoto Purple Sanga	J1 League	16	0	2	0	11	0	29	0
1997	Kyoto Purple Sanga	J1 League	31	1	2	0	5	0	38	1
1998	Avispa Fukuoka	J1 League	16	1	2	1	1	0	19	2
1999	Avispa Fukuoka	J1 League	30	1	1	0	3	0	34	1
2000	Verdy Kawasaki	J1 League	12	0	0	0	2	0	14	0
2001	Tokyo Verdy	J1 League	26	2	0	0	2	0	28	2
2002	Tokyo Verdy	J1 League	3	0	0	0	0	0	3	0
2002	Consadole Sapporo	J1 League	16	1	1	0	0	0	17	1
2003	Consadole Sapporo	J2 League	16	0	0	0	-		16	0
Total			166	6	8	1	24	0	198	7
