= Kenji Kikawada =

Japanese footballer

Kenji Kikawada 黄川田 賢司
Personal information
- Full name: Kenji Kikawada
- Date of birth: October 28, 1974 (age 52)
- Place of birth: Niiza, Saitama, Japan
- Height: 1.79 m (5 ft 10 1/2 in)
- Position: Forward

Youth career
- 1990–1992: Sayamagaoka High School
- 1993–1996: Asia University

Senior career*
Years	Team	Apps	(Gls)
1997–2001	Consadole Sapporo	92	(6)
2002–2003	Kawasaki Frontale	39	(2)
Total		131	(8)
- * Club domestic league appearances and goals

Kenji Kikawada (黄川田 賢司, Kikawada Kenji; born October 28, 1974) is a former Japanese football player. His younger brother Masaya Kikawada is an actor.

== Playing career ==
Kikawada was born in Niiza on October 28, 1974. After graduating from Asia University, he joined the Japan Football League club Consadole Sapporo in 1997. The club won second place in 1997 and was promoted to the J1 League in 1998. He played many matches as forward. In 2002, he moved to Kawasaki Frontale. Although he played many matches in 2002, his opportunity to play decreased in 2003 and he retired in August 2003.

== Career statistics ==
Appearances and goals by club, season and competition
Club	Season	League			Emperor's Cup		J.League Cup		Total	
Club	Season	Division	Apps	Goals	Apps	Goals	Apps	Goals	Apps	Goals
Consadole Sapporo	1997	Football League	8	0	3	0	3	0	14	0
Consadole Sapporo	1998	J1 League	20	1	1	0	0	0	21	1
Consadole Sapporo	1999	J2 League	21	0	1	0	1	0	23	0
Consadole Sapporo	2000	J2 League	30	5	0	0	1	1	31	5
Consadole Sapporo	2001	J1 League	13	0	1	1	1	0	15	1
Kawasaki Frontale	2002	J2 League	34	2	1	0	—		35	2
Kawasaki Frontale	2003	J2 League	5	0	0	0	—		5	0
Career total			131	8	7	1	6	1	144	10
