= 2011 Gainare Tottori season =

Gainare Tottori
2011 season
- Manager: Takeo Matsuda
- Stadium: Tottori Bank Bird Stadium
- J2 League: 19th
| Home colours | Away colours |

2011 Gainare Tottori season.

== J2 League ==
2011 J.League

=== League table ===
| Pos | Team | Pld | W | D | L | GF | GA | GD | Pts |
|---|---|---|---|---|---|---|---|---|---|
| 16 | Kataller Toyama | 38 | 11 | 10 | 17 | 36 | 53 | −17 | 43 |
| 17 | Mito HollyHock | 38 | 11 | 9 | 18 | 40 | 49 | −9 | 42 |
| 18 | Yokohama FC | 38 | 11 | 8 | 19 | 40 | 54 | −14 | 41 |
| 19 | Gainare Tottori | 38 | 8 | 7 | 23 | 36 | 60 | −24 | 31 |
| 20 | FC Gifu | 38 | 6 | 6 | 26 | 39 | 83 | −44 | 24 |

Updated to match(es) played on December 3, 2011. Source: J.League Division 2
Rules for classification: 1st points; 2nd goal differential; 3rd goals scored; 4th head-to-head results; 5th disciplinary points; 6th draw. If two clubs are tied for first place, both clubs will be declared champions.

=== Matches ===
| Match | Date | Team | Score | Team | Venue | Attendance |
|---|---|---|---|---|---|---|
| 1 | 2011.03.06 | Tokushima Vortis | 1-0 | Gainare Tottori | Pocarisweat Stadium | 5,854 |
| 8 | 2011.04.24 | Giravanz Kitakyushu | 0-2 | Gainare Tottori | Honjo Stadium | 3,101 |
| 9 | 2011.04.30 | Gainare Tottori | 0-0 | Kataller Toyama | Tottori Bank Bird Stadium | 3,268 |
| 10 | 2011.05.04 | Yokohama FC | 0-1 | Gainare Tottori | NHK Spring Mitsuzawa Football Stadium | 5,464 |
| 11 | 2011.05.08 | Gainare Tottori | 0-1 | JEF United Chiba | Tottori Bank Bird Stadium | 3,560 |
| 12 | 2011.05.15 | Consadole Sapporo | 2-0 | Gainare Tottori | Sapporo Dome | 9,326 |
| 13 | 2011.05.22 | Gainare Tottori | 1-1 | Mito HollyHock | Tottori Bank Bird Stadium | 2,659 |
| 14 | 2011.05.29 | Tokyo Verdy | 0-0 | Gainare Tottori | Tokyo National Stadium | 2,322 |
| 15 | 2011.06.05 | Gainare Tottori | 2-1 | Kyoto Sanga FC | Tottori Bank Bird Stadium | 3,406 |
| 16 | 2011.06.12 | Ehime FC | 3-2 | Gainare Tottori | Ningineer Stadium | 2,775 |
| 17 | 2011.06.19 | Gainare Tottori | 4-0 | Shonan Bellmare | Tottori Bank Bird Stadium | 3,509 |
| 18 | 2011.06.26 | Oita Trinita | 2-1 | Gainare Tottori | Oita Bank Dome | 5,794 |
| 2 | 2011.06.29 | Gainare Tottori | 1-1 | FC Gifu | Tottori Bank Bird Stadium | 2,633 |
| 19 | 2011.07.02 | FC Tokyo | 3-0 | Gainare Tottori | Ajinomoto Stadium | 16,337 |
| 20 | 2011.07.10 | Gainare Tottori | 0-1 | Giravanz Kitakyushu | Tottori Bank Bird Stadium | 3,390 |
| 21 | 2011.07.18 | Thespa Kusatsu | 0-5 | Gainare Tottori | Shoda Shoyu Stadium Gunma | 1,979 |
| 22 | 2011.07.24 | Gainare Tottori | 0-2 | Tokushima Vortis | Tottori Bank Bird Stadium | 5,720 |
| 23 | 2011.07.31 | Kyoto Sanga FC | 1-0 | Gainare Tottori | Kyoto Nishikyogoku Athletic Stadium | 5,204 |
| 3 | 2011.08.06 | Tochigi SC | 1-0 | Gainare Tottori | Tochigi Green Stadium | 3,054 |
| 24 | 2011.08.14 | Sagan Tosu | 1-0 | Gainare Tottori | Best Amenity Stadium | 5,141 |
| 25 | 2011.08.21 | Gainare Tottori | 0-1 | Yokohama FC | Tottori Bank Bird Stadium | 8,212 |
| 26 | 2011.08.27 | FC Gifu | 2-3 | Gainare Tottori | Gifu Nagaragawa Stadium | 3,519 |
| 4 | 2011.09.04 | Gainare Tottori | 3-6 | Sagan Tosu | Tottori Bank Bird Stadium | 2,559 |
| 27 | 2011.09.10 | Gainare Tottori | 1-1 | Fagiano Okayama | Tottori Bank Bird Stadium | 7,943 |
| 28 | 2011.09.18 | Roasso Kumamoto | 2-0 | Gainare Tottori | Kumamoto Athletics Stadium | 5,200 |
| 29 | 2011.09.24 | Gainare Tottori | 0-1 | Tokyo Verdy | Tottori Bank Bird Stadium | 3,206 |
| 5 | 2011.09.28 | Gainare Tottori | 1-1 | Thespa Kusatsu | Tottori Bank Bird Stadium | 1,787 |
| 30 | 2011.10.01 | Shonan Bellmare | 0-1 | Gainare Tottori | Hiratsuka Stadium | 5,179 |
| 31 | 2011.10.15 | Gainare Tottori | 0-0 | Oita Trinita | Tottori Bank Bird Stadium | 2,837 |
| 6 | 2011.10.19 | Fagiano Okayama | 2-1 | Gainare Tottori | Kanko Stadium | 5,170 |
| 32 | 2011.10.22 | Gainare Tottori | 1-0 | Consadole Sapporo | Tottori Bank Bird Stadium | 3,108 |
| 7 | 2011.10.26 | Gainare Tottori | 0-1 | Roasso Kumamoto | Tottori Bank Bird Stadium | 1,994 |
| 33 | 2011.10.30 | Kataller Toyama | 4-2 | Gainare Tottori | Toyama Stadium | 2,460 |
| 34 | 2011.11.06 | Gainare Tottori | 0-5 | Tochigi SC | Tottori Bank Bird Stadium | 2,111 |
| 35 | 2011.11.12 | JEF United Chiba | 1-0 | Gainare Tottori | Fukuda Denshi Arena | 8,038 |
| 36 | 2011.11.19 | Gainare Tottori | 1-5 | FC Tokyo | Tottori Bank Bird Stadium | 5,746 |
| 37 | 2011.11.27 | Mito HollyHock | 3-1 | Gainare Tottori | K's denki Stadium Mito | 5,227 |
| 38 | 2011.12.03 | Gainare Tottori | 2-4 | Ehime FC | Tottori Bank Bird Stadium | 2,504 |
