= Nobuhito Toriizuka =

Japanese footballer

Nobuhito Toriizuka 鳥居塚 伸人
Personal information
- Full name: Nobuhito Toriizuka
- Date of birth: August 7, 1972 (age 54)
- Place of birth: Maebashi, Gunma, Japan
- Height: 1.66 m (5 ft 5 1/2 in)
- Position: Midfielder

Youth career
- 1988–1990: Maebashi Commercial High School
- 1991–1994: Tokai University

Senior career*
| Years | Team | Apps | (Gls) |
| 1995–1996 | Cosmo Oil Yokkaichi | 57 | (6) |
| 1997–1998 | Consadole Sapporo | 28 | (2) |
| 1999–2002 | Tonan SC | | |
| 2003–2008 | Thespa Kusatsu | 201 | (10) |
| Total | | 286 | (18) |
- * Club domestic league appearances and goals

Nobuhito Toriizuka (鳥居塚 伸人, Toriizuka Nobuhito; born August 7, 1972) is a former Japanese football player.

== Playing career ==
Toriizuka was born in Maebashi on August 7, 1972. After graduating from Tokai University, he joined Japan Football League (JFL) club Cosmo Oil (later Cosmo Oil Yokkaichi) in 1995. He played as regular player from first season. However the club was disbanded end of 1996 season. In 1997, he moved to JFL club Consadole Sapporo. The club won the 2nd place in 1997 and was promoted to J1 League from 1998. However he could not become a regular player. In 1999, he moved to his local club Tonan SC in Prefectural Leagues. He played many matches and the club was promoted to Regional Leagues from 2001. In 2003, he moved to Regional Leagues club Thespa Kusatsu. He played as regular player and the club was promoted to Japan Football League in 2004 and J2 League in 2005. He played as central player for a long time and retired end of 2008 season.

== Club statistics ==
| Club performance | | | League | | Cup | | League Cup | | Total | |
| Season | Club | League | Apps | Goals | Apps | Goals | Apps | Goals | Apps | Goals |
| Japan | | | League | | Emperor's Cup | | J.League Cup | | Total | |
|---|---|---|---|---|---|---|---|---|---|---|
| 1995 | Cosmo Oil | Football League | 29 | 4 | 0 | 0 | - | | 29 | 4 |
| 1996 | Cosmo Oil Yokkaichi | Football League | 28 | 2 | 4 | 0 | - | | 32 | 2 |
| 1997 | Consadole Sapporo | Football League | 18 | 2 | 2 | 0 | 6 | 1 | 26 | 3 |
| 1998 | Consadole Sapporo | J1 League | 10 | 0 | 0 | 0 | 2 | 0 | 12 | 0 |
| 1999 | Tonan SC | Prefectural Leagues | | | | | | | | |
| 2000 | Tonan SC | Prefectural Leagues | | | | | | | | |
| 2001 | Tonan SC | Regional Leagues | 17 | 4 | - | | - | | 17 | 4 |
| 2002 | Tonan SC | Regional Leagues | 9 | 0 | - | | - | | 9 | 0 |
| 2003 | Thespa Kusatsu | Regional Leagues | 14 | 1 | 1 | 0 | - | | 15 | 1 |
| 2004 | Thespa Kusatsu | Football League | 28 | 2 | 4 | 0 | - | | 32 | 2 |
| 2005 | Thespa Kusatsu | J2 League | 35 | 0 | 1 | 0 | - | | 36 | 0 |
| 2006 | Thespa Kusatsu | J2 League | 42 | 0 | 2 | 0 | - | | 44 | 0 |
| 2007 | Thespa Kusatsu | J2 League | 48 | 4 | 2 | 0 | - | | 50 | 4 |
| 2008 | Thespa Kusatsu | J2 League | 34 | 3 | 0 | 0 | - | | 34 | 3 |
| Total | | | 312 | 22 | 16 | 0 | 8 | 1 | 336 | 23 |
