= Hiroshi Kichise =

Japanese footballer

Hiroshi Kichise 吉瀬 広志
Personal information
- Full name: Hiroshi Kichise
- Date of birth: July 10, 1983 (age 43)
- Place of birth: Kasuga, Fukuoka, Japan
- Height: 1.78 m (5 ft 10 in)
- Position: Defender

Youth career
- 1999–2001: Chikuyo Gakuen High School

Senior career*
Years	Team	Apps	(Gls)
2002–2007	Consadole Sapporo	18	(0)
2005	→Mito HollyHock (loan)	17	(0)
2006	→Albirex Niigata Singapore (loan)	15	(0)
2008	Gainare Tottori	22	(1)
Total		75	(1)
- * Club domestic league appearances and goals

Hiroshi Kichise (吉瀬 広志, Kichise Hiroshi; born July 10, 1983) is a former Japanese football player.

== Playing career ==
Kichise was born in Kasuga on July 10, 1983. After graduating from high school, he joined J1 League club Consadole Sapporo in 2002. He debuted in April and played several matches in 2002. However Consadole finished at the bottom place in 2002 season and was relegated to J2 League. Although he could not play at all in the match in 2002, he played many matches in 2004. In 2005, he moved to Mito HollyHock on loan and played many matches. In 2006, he moved to Albirex Niigata Singapore on loan. In 2007, he returned to Consadole. However he could hardly play in the match in 2007. In 2008, he moved to Japan Football League club Gainare Tottori. Although he played many matches, he retired end of 2008 season.

== Club statistics ==
Club performance			League		Cup		League Cup		Total	
Season	Club	League	Apps	Goals	Apps	Goals	Apps	Goals	Apps	Goals
Japan			League		Emperor's Cup		J.League Cup		Total	
2002	Consadole Sapporo	J1 League	1	0	0	0	6	0	7	0
2003	Consadole Sapporo	J2 League	0	0	0	0	-		0	0
2004	Consadole Sapporo	J2 League	15	0	0	0	-		15	0
2005	Mito HollyHock	J2 League	17	0	1	0	-		18	0
Singapore			League		Singapore Cup		League Cup		Total	
2006	Albirex Niigata Singapore	S. League	15	0	1	0	-		16	0
Japan			League		Emperor's Cup		J.League Cup		Total	
2007	Consadole Sapporo	J2 League	2	0	1	0	-		3	0
2008	Gainare Tottori	Football League	22	1	1	0	-		23	1
Country	Japan		57	1	3	0	6	0	66	1
Country	Singapore		15	0	1	0	-		16	0
Total			72	1	4	0	6	0	82	1
