= Chiyogadai Park Athletic Studium =

Stadium in Hakodate, Hokkaidō, Japan

Coordinates: 41°47′10″N 140°44′43″E

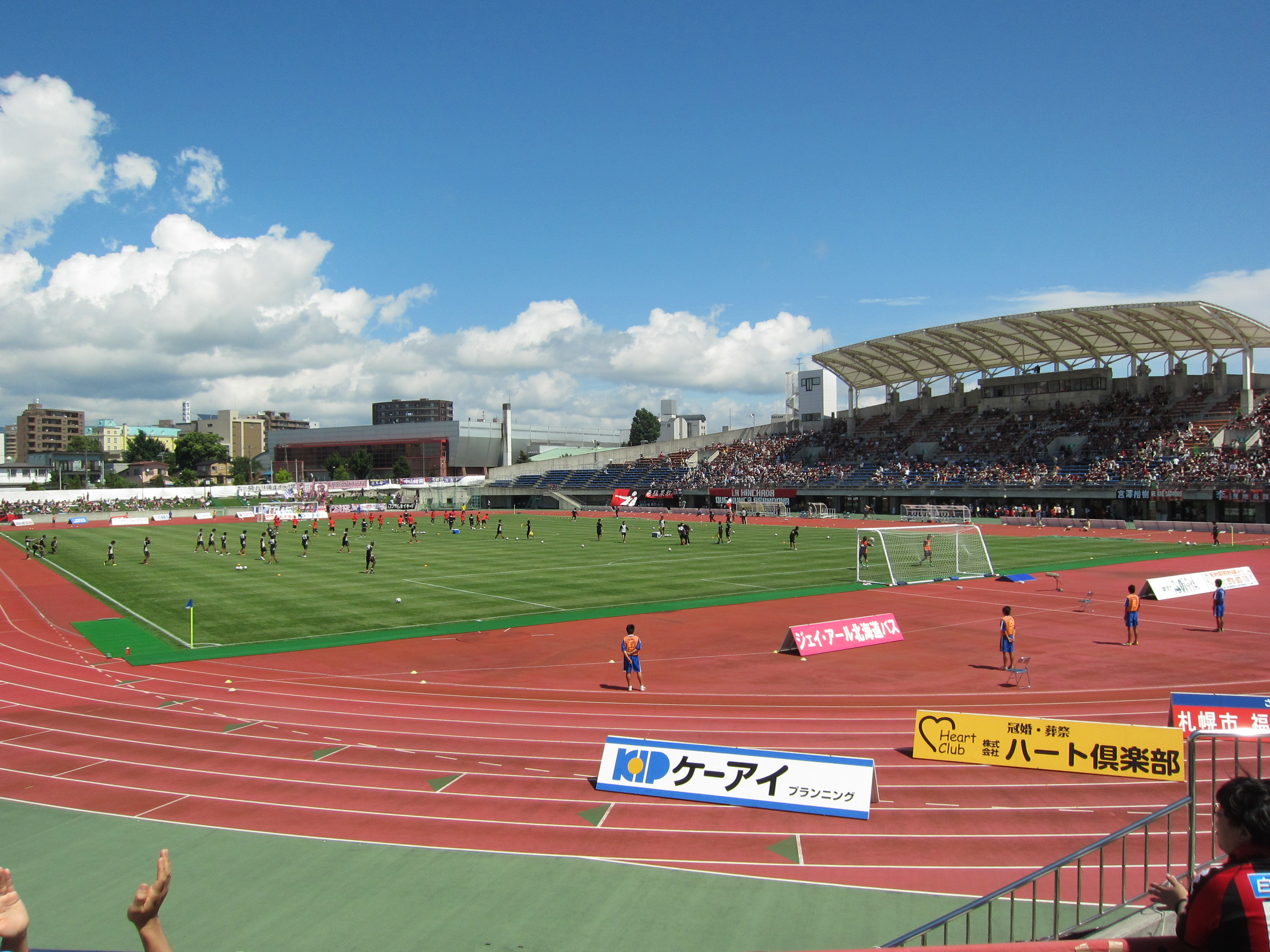
- Interactive map of Chiyogadai Park Athletic Studium
- Location: Hakodate, Hokkaido, Japan
- Owner: Hakodate City
- Operator: Hakodate Foundation in Culture and Sports Promotion
- Capacity: 15,000
- Field size: 106 m × 69 m

Construction
- Opened: 1961
- Renovated: 2001

Chiyogadai Park Athletic Studium (千代台公園陸上競技場) is a multi-use stadium in Hakodate, Hokkaido, Japan. It holds 15,000 people. It is mostly used for track and field competitions as well as football games.

The stadium was completely renovated in 2001, and since then has also been used by the J.League team Hokkaido Consadole Sapporo.
