= Muroran Irie Stadium =

Athletic stadium in Muroran, Japan

Coordinates: 42°19′17″N 140°58′38″E

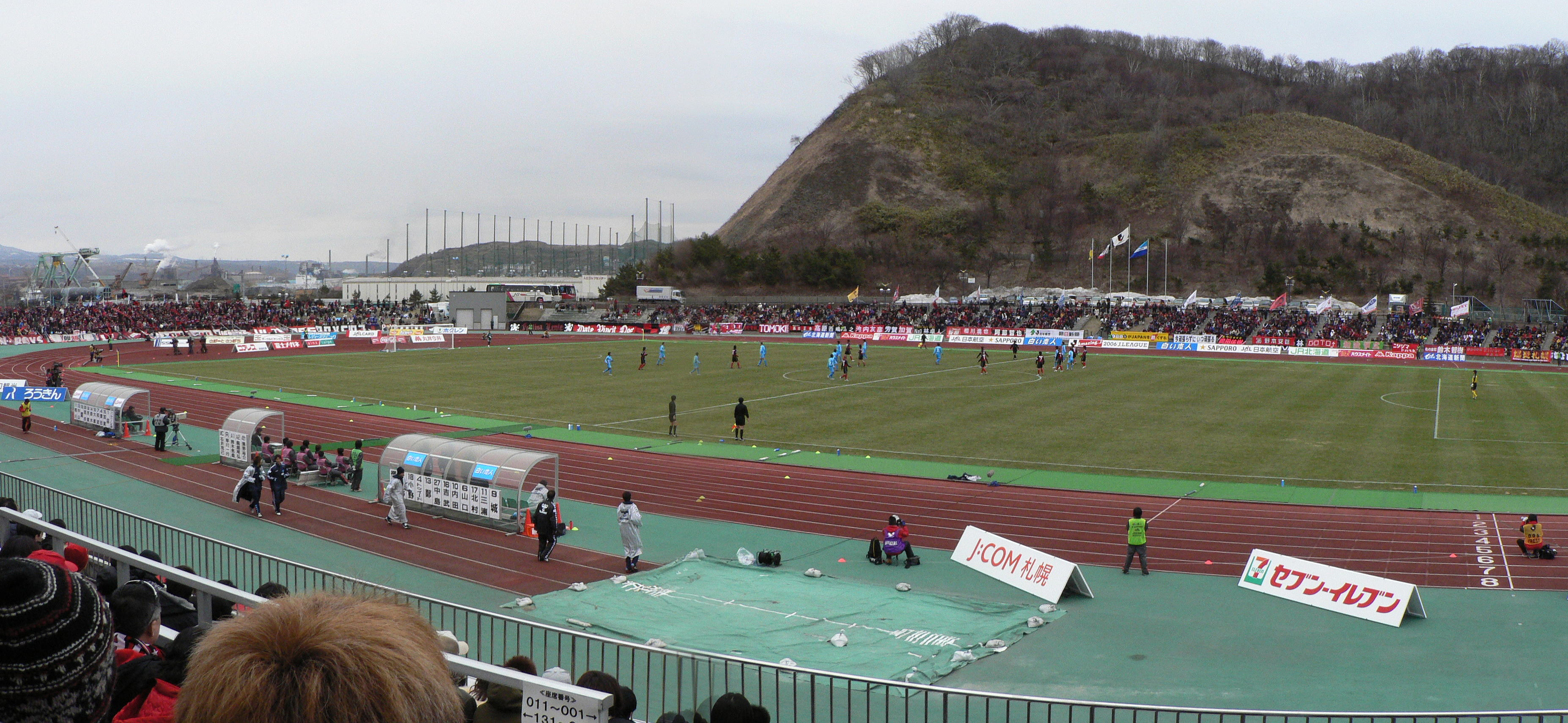
- Muroran Irie Stadium, March 2006
- Interactive map of Muroran Irie Stadium
- Location: Muroran, Hokkaido, Japan
- Owner: Muroran City
- Operator: Muroran City Athletic Association
- Capacity: 12,600
- Surface: Grass
- Field size: 69 m × 106 m

Construction
- Opened: 1988

Muroran Irie Stadium (室蘭市入江運動公園陸上競技場, Muroran Irie undōkōen rikujō kyōgijō) is an athletic stadium in Muroran, Hokkaido, Japan. It is mainly used for track and field competitions, and is also used for football games.

From 1998, it was the main stadium for the J. League football team Consadole Sapporo in early spring and late autumn months, before the Sapporo Dome opened; and after that, until 2011, they played every year, one J. League game at this stadium.
