= Sapporo Atsubetsu Stadium =

Stadium in Sapporo, Hokkaido, Japan

Coordinates: 43°01′09″N 141°27′50″E

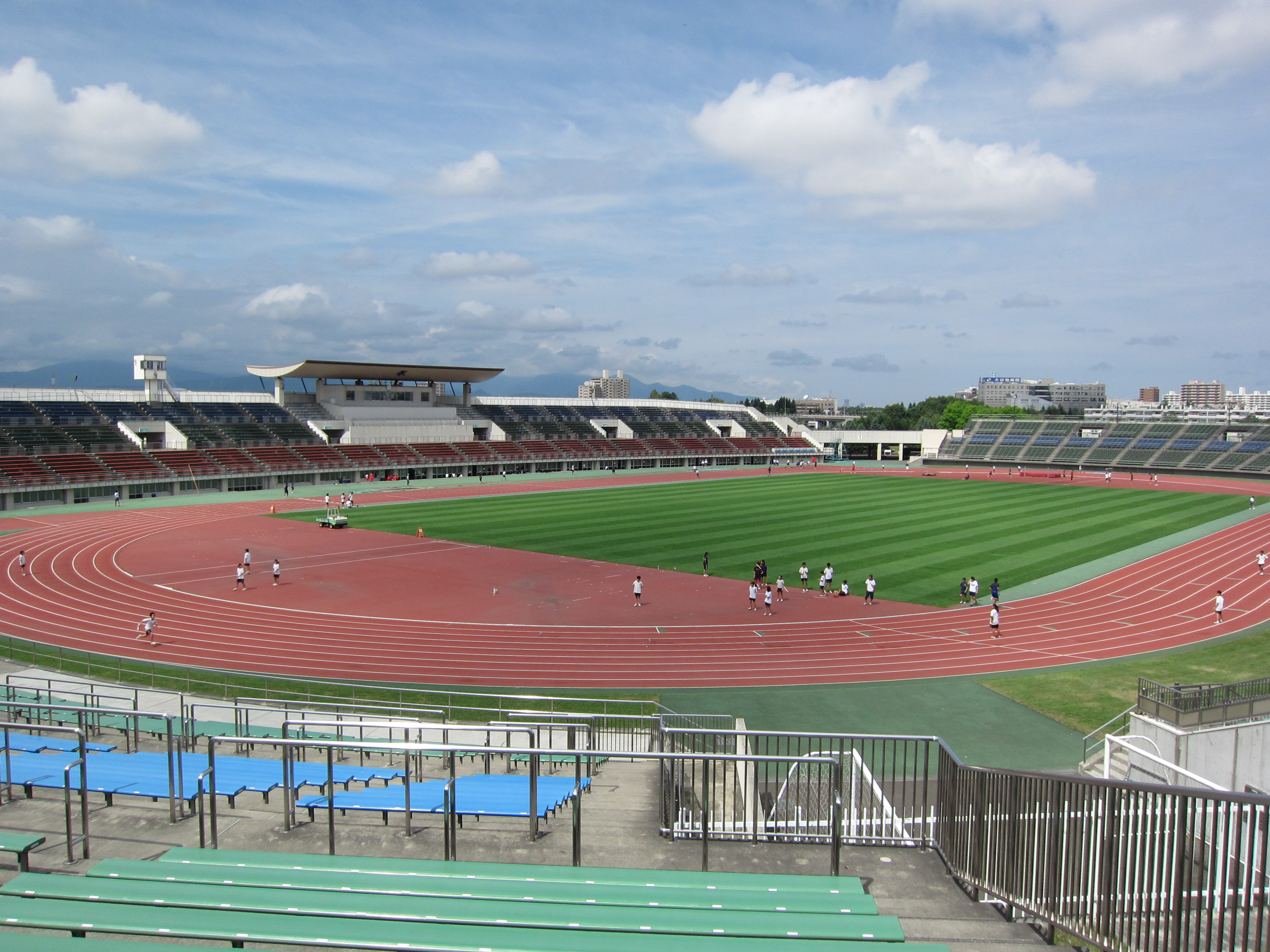
- Interactive map of Sapporo Atsubetsu Stadium
- Location: Sapporo, Hokkaido, Japan
- Owner: Sapporo City
- Capacity: 20,861

Construction
- Opened: 1986

Sapporo Atsubetsu Stadium (札幌厚別公園競技場) is a multi-use stadium in Sapporo, Hokkaido, Japan. It is currently used mostly for football matches. It serves as a home ground of Hokkaido Consadole Sapporo in addition to the Sapporo Dome. The stadium holds 20,005 people and was built in 1980.
