= 2000 Oita Trinita season =

Oita Trinita
2000 season
- Manager: Nobuhiro Ishizaki
- Stadium: Oita Athletic Stadium
- J.League 2: 3rd
- Emperor's Cup: 3rd Round
- J.League Cup: 1st Round
- Top goalscorer: Will (22)
| Home colours | Away colours |

2000 Oita Trinita season

== Competitions ==
| Competitions | Position |
|---|---|
| J.League 2 | 3rd / 11 clubs |
| Emperor's Cup | 3rd round |
| J.League Cup | 1st round |

== Domestic results ==
=== J.League 2 ===
| 12 March 2000 1 | Oita Trinita | 3-1 | Montedio Yamagata | Oita Athletic Stadium |
| JST (UTC+09) |

| 19 March 2000 2 | Mito HollyHock | 2-1 | Oita Trinita | Hitachinaka City Stadium |
| JST (UTC+09) |

| 26 March 2000 3 | Oita Trinita | 1-2 (GG) (a.e.t.) | Shonan Bellmare | Oita Athletic Stadium |
| JST (UTC+09) |

| 30 March 2000 4 | Omiya Ardija | 2-5 | Oita Trinita | Omiya Football Stadium |
| JST (UTC+09) |

| 2 April 2000 5 | Oita Trinita | 2-0 | Sagan Tosu | Saiki Stadium |
| JST (UTC+09) |

| 8 April 2000 6 | Ventforet Kofu | 1-3 | Oita Trinita | Kose Sports Park Stadium |
| JST (UTC+09) |

| 15 April 2000 7 | Oita Trinita | 0-0 (GG) (a.e.t.) | Consadole Sapporo | Oita Athletic Stadium |
| JST (UTC+09) |

| 23 April 2000 8 | Albirex Niigata | 0-3 | Oita Trinita | Niigata City Athletic Stadium |
| JST (UTC+09) |

| 29 April 2000 9 | Oita Trinita | 4-1 | Vegalta Sendai | Saiki Stadium |
| JST (UTC+09) |

| 3 May 2000 10 | Urawa Red Diamonds | 2-1 | Oita Trinita | Urawa Komaba Stadium |
| JST (UTC+09) |

| 11 | bye |

| 13 May 2000 12 | Montedio Yamagata | 0-2 | Oita Trinita | Yamagata Park Stadium |
| JST (UTC+09) |

| 18 May 2000 13 | Oita Trinita | 3-0 | Mito HollyHock | Oita Athletic Stadium |
| JST (UTC+09) |

| 21 May 2000 14 | Shonan Bellmare | 2-1 | Oita Trinita | Hiratsuka Athletics Stadium |
| JST (UTC+09) |

| 25 May 2000 15 | Oita Trinita | 2-1 | Omiya Ardija | Oita Athletic Stadium |
| JST (UTC+09) |

| 1 June 2000 16 | Sagan Tosu | 0-1 | Oita Trinita | Tosu Stadium |
| JST (UTC+09) |

| 4 June 2000 17 | Oita Trinita | 2-0 | Ventforet Kofu | Saiki Stadium |
| JST (UTC+09) |

| 10 June 2000 18 | Consadole Sapporo | 2-1 (GG) (a.e.t.) | Oita Trinita | Sapporo Atsubetsu Park Stadium |
| JST (UTC+09) |

| 17 June 2000 19 | Oita Trinita | 2-3 | Albirex Niigata | Oita Athletic Stadium |
| JST (UTC+09) |

| 21 June 2000 20 | Vegalta Sendai | 1-0 | Oita Trinita | Sendai Stadium |
| JST (UTC+09) |

| 24 June 2000 21 | Oita Trinita | 1-1 (GG) (a.e.t.) | Urawa Red Diamonds | Oita Athletic Stadium |
| JST (UTC+09) |

| 22 | bye |

| 9 July 2000 23 | Omiya Ardija | 0-1 | Oita Trinita | Omiya Football Stadium |
| JST (UTC+09) |

| 22 July 2000 24 | Oita Trinita | 1-0 | Sagan Tosu | Oita Athletic Stadium |
| JST (UTC+09) |

| 28 July 2000 25 | Ventforet Kofu | 2-3 | Oita Trinita | Kose Sports Park Stadium |
| JST (UTC+09) |

| 2 August 2000 26 | Oita Trinita | 1-0 | Consadole Sapporo | Oita Athletic Stadium |
| JST (UTC+09) |

| 5 August 2000 27 | Albirex Niigata | 2-1 (GG) (a.e.t.) | Oita Trinita | Niigata City Athletic Stadium |
| JST (UTC+09) |

| 12 August 2000 28 | Oita Trinita | 5-0 | Vegalta Sendai | Oita Athletic Stadium |
| JST (UTC+09) |

| 19 August 2000 29 | Urawa Red Diamonds | 4-1 | Oita Trinita | Urawa Komaba Stadium |
| JST (UTC+09) |

| 30 | bye |

| 2 September 2000 31 | Oita Trinita | 2-1 | Montedio Yamagata | Oita Athletic Stadium |
| JST (UTC+09) |

| 10 September 2000 32 | Mito HollyHock | 0-2 | Oita Trinita | Hitachi Athletic Stadium |
| JST (UTC+09) |

| 15 September 2000 33 | Oita Trinita | 5-0 | Shonan Bellmare | Suizenji Stadium |
| JST (UTC+09) |

| 24 September 2000 34 | Sagan Tosu | 0-2 | Oita Trinita | Tosu Stadium |
| JST (UTC+09) |

| 28 September 2000 35 | Oita Trinita | 4-1 | Ventforet Kofu | Oita Athletic Stadium |
| JST (UTC+09) |

| 1 October 2000 36 | Consadole Sapporo | 2-1 | Oita Trinita | Sapporo Atsubetsu Park Stadium |
| JST (UTC+09) |

| 5 October 2000 37 | Oita Trinita | 2-1 | Albirex Niigata | Oita Athletic Stadium |
| JST (UTC+09) |

| 15 October 2000 38 | Vegalta Sendai | 0-3 | Oita Trinita | Sendai Stadium |
| JST (UTC+09) |

| 22 October 2000 39 | Oita Trinita | 0-2 | Urawa Red Diamonds | Oita Athletic Stadium |
| JST (UTC+09) |

| 40 | bye |

| 5 November 2000 41 | Montedio Yamagata | 2-2 (GG) (a.e.t.) | Oita Trinita | Tsuruoka Komakihara Stadium |
| JST (UTC+09) |

| 10 November 2000 42 | Oita Trinita | 3-0 | Mito HollyHock | Oita Athletic Stadium |
| JST (UTC+09) |

| 16 November 2000 43 | Shonan Bellmare | 0-2 | Oita Trinita | Hiratsuka Athletics Stadium |
| JST (UTC+09) |

| 19 November 2000 44 | Oita Trinita | 1-0 | Omiya Ardija | Oita Athletic Stadium |
| JST (UTC+09) |

=== Emperor's Cup ===
| 25 November 2000 1st Round | Hatsushiba Hashimoto High School | 0-5 | Oita Trinita | Kimiidera Athletic Stadium |
| JST (UTC+09) |

| 3 December 2000 2nd Round | Oita Trinita | 7-0 | Ueda Gentian | Nobeoka Nishishina Athletic Stadium |
| JST (UTC+09) |

| 10 December 2000 3rd Round | Gamba Osaka | 4-1 | Oita Trinita | Osaka Expo '70 Stadium |
| JST (UTC+09) |

=== J.League Cup ===
| 12 April 2000 1st Round-1 | Oita Trinita | 2-2 | JEF United Ichihara | Oita Athletic Stadium |
| JST (UTC+09) |

| 19 April 2000 1st Round-2 | JEF United Ichihara | 3-1 (5-3 agg.) | Oita Trinita | Ichihara Seaside Stadium |
| JST (UTC+09) |

== Player statistics ==
| No. | Pos. | Nat. | Player | D.o.B. (Age) | Height / Weight | J.League 2 | | Emperor's Cup | | J.League Cup | | Total | |
| No. | Pos. | Nat. | Player | D.o.B. (Age) | Height / Weight | Apps | Goals | Apps | Goals | Apps | Goals | Apps | Goals |
|---|---|---|---|---|---|---|---|---|---|---|---|---|---|
| 1 | GK | (Japan) | Kazuya Maekawa | March 22, 1968 (aged 31) | cm / kg | 37 | 0 | | | | | | |
| 2 | DF | (Japan) | Takashi Miki | July 23, 1978 (aged 21) | cm / kg | 23 | 0 | | | | | | |
| 3 | DF | (Japan) | Kazuhiro Murata | May 12, 1969 (aged 30) | cm / kg | 15 | 0 | | | | | | |
| 4 | DF | (Japan) | Yasunari Hiraoka | March 13, 1972 (aged 27) | cm / kg | 19 | 1 | | | | | | |
| 5 | DF | (Brazil) | Sidiclei | May 13, 1972 (aged 27) | cm / kg | 35 | 5 | | | | | | |
| 6 | DF | (Japan) | Daiki Wakamatsu | August 2, 1976 (aged 23) | cm / kg | 29 | 2 | | | | | | |
| 7 | MF | (Japan) | Motoki Kawasaki | February 2, 1979 (aged 21) | cm / kg | 38 | 5 | | | | | | |
| 8 | MF | (Japan) | Iwao Yamane | July 31, 1976 (aged 23) | cm / kg | 35 | 4 | | | | | | |
| 9 | FW | (Brazil) | Valdney | April 20, 1971 (aged 28) | cm / kg | 10 | 4 | | | | | | |
| 9 | MF | (Brazil) | Luciano | June 19, 1977 (aged 22) | cm / kg | 7 | 1 | | | | | | |
| 9 | FW | (Brazil) | Andradina | September 13, 1974 (aged 25) | cm / kg | 17 | 9 | | | | | | |
| 10 | FW | (Brazil) | Will | December 15, 1973 (aged 26) | cm / kg | 29 | 22 | | | | | | |
| 11 | FW | (Japan) | Susumu Oki | February 23, 1976 (aged 24) | cm / kg | 6 | 0 | | | | | | |
| 12 | DF | (Japan) | Tetsuya Yamazaki | July 25, 1978 (aged 21) | cm / kg | 10 | 0 | | | | | | |
| 13 | MF | (Japan) | Takashi Shoji | September 14, 1971 (aged 28) | cm / kg | 19 | 3 | | | | | | |
| 14 | MF | (Japan) | Haruki Seto | March 14, 1978 (aged 21) | cm / kg | 21 | 1 | | | | | | |
| 15 | MF | (Japan) | Takashi Umeda | May 30, 1976 (aged 23) | cm / kg | 12 | 1 | | | | | | |
| 16 | MF | (Japan) | Keita Kanemoto | July 13, 1977 (aged 22) | cm / kg | 13 | 0 | | | | | | |
| 17 | GK | (Japan) | Keisuke Yoshisaka | May 15, 1974 (aged 25) | cm / kg | 0 | 0 | | | | | | |
| 18 | DF | (Japan) | Tomohiro Katanosaka | April 18, 1971 (aged 28) | cm / kg | 5 | 0 | | | | | | |
| 19 | MF | (Japan) | Takeshi Yamaguchi | June 10, 1979 (aged 20) | cm / kg | 0 | 0 | | | | | | |
| 20 | FW | (Japan) | Hiroshi Sakai | October 19, 1976 (aged 23) | cm / kg | 2 | 0 | | | | | | |
| 21 | GK | (Japan) | Kenji Koyama | September 5, 1972 (aged 27) | cm / kg | 4 | 0 | | | | | | |
| 22 | DF | (Japan) | Akira Kaji | January 13, 1980 (aged 20) | cm / kg | 34 | 3 | | | | | | |
| 23 | DF | (Japan) | Yuzo Wada | May 2, 1980 (aged 19) | cm / kg | 12 | 4 | | | | | | |
| 24 | MF | (Japan) | Kazuhisa Hamaoka | February 28, 1981 (aged 19) | cm / kg | 0 | 0 | | | | | | |
| 25 | MF | (Japan) | Ryohei Koike | August 24, 1980 (aged 19) | cm / kg | 0 | 0 | | | | | | |
| 26 | DF | (Japan) | Toshihiro Yoshimura | June 28, 1971 (aged 28) | cm / kg | 37 | 0 | | | | | | |
| 27 | DF | (Japan) | Seiichi Akahoshi | September 6, 1980 (aged 19) | cm / kg | 0 | 0 | | | | | | |
| 28 | FW | (Brazil) | Andre | July 15, 1980 (aged 19) | cm / kg | 1 | 0 | | | | | | |
| 28 | MF | (Japan) | Kensuke Kagami | November 21, 1974 (aged 25) | cm / kg | 15 | 2 | | | | | | |
| 29 | FW | (Japan) | Daiki Takamatsu | September 8, 1981 (aged 18) | cm / kg | 6 | 1 | | | | | | |
| 30 | MF | (Japan) | Yoshiya Takemura | December 6, 1973 (aged 26) | cm / kg | 39 | 5 | | | | | | |
| 31 | FW | (Japan) | Takayuki Yoshida | March 14, 1977 (aged 22) | cm / kg | 20 | 6 | | | | | | |
| 32 | GK | (Japan) | Koji Fujikawa | October 7, 1978 (aged 21) | cm / kg | 0 | 0 | | | | | | |
