= 2000 J.League Division 2 =

J.League Division 2
- Season: 2000
- Champions: Consadole Sapporo; 1st J2 title 4th D2 title
- Promoted: Consadole Sapporo; Urawa Red Diamonds
- Matches: 220
- Goals: 610 (2.77 per match)
- Top goalscorer: Emerson Sheik (31 goals)
- Highest attendance: 20,207; Urawa Red Diamonds 2–1 Sagan Tosu (19 November 1999)
- Lowest attendance: 721; Mito HollyHock 1–4 Sagan Tosu (2 August 2000)
- Total attendance: 1,340,820
- Average attendance: 6,095

Statistics of J.League Division 2 in the 2000 season.

== Overview ==
It was contested by 11 teams, and Consadole Sapporo won the championship.

== Clubs ==
The following 11 clubs participated in J.League Division 2 during the 2000 season.

- Albirex Niigata
- Consadole Sapporo
- Mito HollyHock
- Montedio Yamagata
- Oita Trinita
- Omiya Ardija
- Sagan Tosu
- Shonan Bellmare
- Urawa Red Diamonds
- Vegalta Sendai
- Ventforet Kofu

=== Personnel ===
Club	Head coach
Albirex Niigata	(Japan) Yoshikazu Nagai
Consadole Sapporo	(Japan) Takeshi Okada
Mito HollyHock	(Federal Republic of Yugoslavia) Branko Babić
Montedio Yamagata	(Japan) Shigeharu Ueki
Oita Trinita	(Japan) Nobuhiro Ishizaki
Omiya Ardija	(Japan) Toshiya Miura
Sagan Tosu	(Japan) Kazuhiro Koso
Shonan Bellmare	(Japan) Hisashi Kato
Urawa Red Diamonds	(Japan) Kenzo Yokoyama
Vegalta Sendai	(Japan) Hidehiko Shimizu
Ventforet Kofu	(Japan) Yuji Tsukada

=== Foreign players ===
Club	Player 1	Player 2	Player 3	Non-visa foreign	Former players
Albirex Niigata	(Brazil) Marco Túlio	(Brazil) Nasa	(Brazil) Serjão		
Consadole Sapporo	(Brazil) Almir	(Brazil) Biju	(Brazil) Emerson Sheik		
Mito HollyHock	(Brazil) Cléber	(Brazil) João Paulo	(Brazil) Leandro Perez	(Ghana) Michael Yano	
Montedio Yamagata	(Brazil) Washington	(Cameroon) Edwin Ifeanyi			(Brazil) Jeferson
Oita Trinita	(Brazil) Andradina	(Brazil) Sidiclei	(Brazil) Will		(Brazil) André (Brazil) Gugu (Brazil) Valdney
Omiya Ardija	(Brazil) Jorginho	(England) Mark Burke	(Netherlands) Jan Veenhof		
Sagan Tosu	(Brazil) André	(Brazil) Gugu		(South Korea) Pak Yong-ho	
Shonan Bellmare	(Croatia) Branko Hucika	(Paraguay) Ángel Ortiz	(Paraguay) Daniel Sanabria		(Tajikistan) Vitaliy Parakhnevych
Urawa Red Diamonds	(Brazil) Adiel	(Poland) Andrzej Kubica	(Uruguay) Fernando Picun		(Federal Republic of Yugoslavia) Željko Petrović
Vegalta Sendai	(Brazil) Ricardo	(Federal Republic of Yugoslavia) Slobodan Dubajić		(Philippines) Satoshi Ōtomo	(Brazil) Rodrigo
Ventforet Kofu	(Brazil) Sandro Zamboni	(Romania) Ovidiu Burcă		(South Korea) Kim Hwang-jung (South Korea) Kim Myung-hwi	(Brazil) Antônio

== Final table ==
Pos	Team	Pld	W	OTW	D	OTL	L	GF	GA	GD	Pts	Promotion
1	Consadole Sapporo (C)	40	27	4	5	0	4	71	22	+49	94	Promoted to the 2001 J.League Division 1
2	Urawa Red Diamonds (Note: Relegated from 1999 J.League Division 1)	40	23	5	3	2	7	82	40	+42	82	Promoted to the 2001 J.League Division 1
3	Oita Trinita	40	26	0	3	3	8	80	38	+42	81	
4	Omiya Ardija	40	21	2	1	2	14	55	49	+6	68	
5	Vegalta Sendai	40	15	4	2	4	15	60	69	−9	55	
6	Sagan Tosu	40	13	2	5	5	15	41	52	−11	48	
7	Albirex Niigata	40	11	4	5	2	18	54	63	−9	46	
8	Shonan Bellmare	40	12	3	1	7	17	59	71	−12	43	
9	Mito HollyHock (Note: Promoted from 1999 JFL)	40	9	6	4	2	19	37	61	−24	43	
10	Montedio Yamagata	40	9	2	2	3	24	40	61	−21	33	
11	Ventforet Kofu	40	5	0	3	2	30	31	84	−53	18	

(C) Champion

== Top scorers ==
As of 19 November 2000

Rank	Player	Club	Goals
1	(Brazil) Emerson Sheik	Consadole Sapporo	31
2	(Brazil) Will	Oita Trinita	22
3	(Japan) Naoki Naruo	Albirex Niigata	17
4	(Brazil) Jorginho	Omiya Ardija	15
4	(Japan) Ryūji Bando	Consadole Sapporo	15
6	(Japan) Yoshika Matsubara	Shonan Bellmare	12
6	(Japan) Yuichiro Nagai	Urawa Red Diamonds	12
8	(Japan) Masakiyo Maezono	Shonan Bellmare	11
8	(Japan) Shingo Suzuki	Albirex Niigata	11
8	(Poland) Andrzej Kubica	Urawa Red Diamonds	11

== Attendances ==
#	Football club	Total attendance	Home games	Average	Highest	Lowest
1	Urawa Red Diamonds	338,457	20	16,923	20,207	13,408
2	Consadole Sapporo	258,206	20	12,910	19,863	3,162
3	Vegalta Sendai	177,697	20	8,885	18,706	5,033
4	Shonan Bellmare	99,362	20	4,968	14,868	2,186
5	Oita Trinita	96,368	20	4,818	14,639	1,863
6	Albirex Niigata	80,139	20	4,007	11,662	1,786
7	Sagan Tosu	74,289	20	3,714	10,177	1,869
8	Montedio Yamagata	69,352	20	3,468	11,671	1,252
9	Omiya Ardija	69,531	20	3,477	9,499	844
10	Mito HollyHock	40,415	20	2,021	6,155	721
11	Ventforet Kofu	37,004	20	1,850	6,005	724
