= 1999 Oita Trinita season =

Oita Trinita
1999 season
- Manager: Nobuhiro Ishizaki
- Stadium: Oita Athletic Stadium
- J.League 2: 3rd
- Emperor's Cup: 3rd Round
- J.League Cup: 2nd Round
- Top goalscorer: Takuya Jinno (19)
Home colours	Away colours

1999 Oita Trinita season

== Competitions ==
Competitions	Position
J.League 2	3rd / 10 clubs
Emperor's Cup	3rd round
J.League Cup	2nd round

== Domestic results ==
=== J.League 2 ===
14 March 1999 1	Oita Trinita	1-0	Consadole Sapporo	Oita Athletic Stadium
JST (UTC+09)

21 March 1999 2	Oita Trinita	1-0	Kawasaki Frontale	Oita Athletic Stadium
JST (UTC+09)

28 March 1999 3	Omiya Ardija	5-0	Oita Trinita	Omiya Football Stadium
JST (UTC+09)

4 April 1999 4	Oita Trinita	2-1	Montedio Yamagata	Oita Athletic Stadium
JST (UTC+09)

11 April 1999 5	Sagan Tosu	1-3	Oita Trinita	Saga Stadium
JST (UTC+09)

17 April 1999 6	Oita Trinita	1-1 (GG) (a.e.t.)	FC Tokyo	Oita Athletic Stadium
JST (UTC+09)

25 April 1999 7	Vegalta Sendai	1-3	Oita Trinita	Sendai Stadium
JST (UTC+09)

29 April 1999 8	Oita Trinita	1-1 (GG) (a.e.t.)	Ventforet Kofu	Saiki Stadium
JST (UTC+09)

2 May 1999 9	Oita Trinita	1-0	Albirex Niigata	Oita Athletic Stadium
JST (UTC+09)

5 May 1999 10	Kawasaki Frontale	2-1	Oita Trinita	Todoroki Athletics Stadium
JST (UTC+09)

9 May 1999 11	Oita Trinita	1-0	Omiya Ardija	Oita Athletic Stadium
JST (UTC+09)

16 May 1999 12	Montedio Yamagata	2-1	Oita Trinita	Yamagata Park Stadium
JST (UTC+09)

22 May 1999 13	Oita Trinita	4-0	Sagan Tosu	Oita Athletic Stadium
JST (UTC+09)

29 May 1999 14	FC Tokyo	1-0 (GG) (a.e.t.)	Oita Trinita	Nishigaoka Soccer Stadium
JST (UTC+09)

26 June 1999 15	Oita Trinita	2-0	Vegalta Sendai	Oita Athletic Stadium
JST (UTC+09)

4 July 1999 16	Ventforet Kofu	1-2	Oita Trinita	Kose Sports Park Stadium
JST (UTC+09)

11 July 1999 17	Albirex Niigata	0-2	Oita Trinita	Niigata City Athletic Stadium
JST (UTC+09)

17 July 1999 18	Consadole Sapporo	1-0 (GG) (a.e.t.)	Oita Trinita	Sapporo Atsubetsu Park Stadium
JST (UTC+09)

1 August 1999 19	Montedio Yamagata	1-0	Oita Trinita	Yamagata Park Stadium
JST (UTC+09)

7 August 1999 20	Oita Trinita	2-4	FC Tokyo	Oita Athletic Stadium
JST (UTC+09)

15 August 1999 21	Consadole Sapporo	3-2 (GG) (a.e.t.)	Oita Trinita	Sapporo Atsubetsu Park Stadium
JST (UTC+09)

21 August 1999 22	Oita Trinita	0-1	Kawasaki Frontale	Oita Athletic Stadium
JST (UTC+09)

31 August 1999 23	Ventforet Kofu	0-4	Oita Trinita	Kose Sports Park Stadium
JST (UTC+09)

5 September 1999 24	Oita Trinita	5-0	Omiya Ardija	Oita Athletic Stadium
JST (UTC+09)

12 September 1999 25	Vegalta Sendai	1-2 (GG) (a.e.t.)	Oita Trinita	Sendai Stadium
JST (UTC+09)

15 September 1999 26	Oita Trinita	0-1	Albirex Niigata	Oita Athletic Stadium
JST (UTC+09)

19 September 1999 27	Sagan Tosu	2-3	Oita Trinita	Tosu Stadium
JST (UTC+09)

25 September 1999 28	FC Tokyo	4-2	Oita Trinita	Komazawa Olympic Park Stadium
JST (UTC+09)

2 October 1999 29	Oita Trinita	2-0	Consadole Sapporo	Oita Athletic Stadium
JST (UTC+09)

11 October 1999 30	Kawasaki Frontale	0-3	Oita Trinita	Nagano Athletic Stadium
JST (UTC+09)

16 October 1999 31	Oita Trinita	2-1 (GG) (a.e.t.)	Ventforet Kofu	Oita Athletic Stadium
JST (UTC+09)

24 October 1999 32	Omiya Ardija	2-3	Oita Trinita	Omiya Football Stadium
JST (UTC+09)

31 October 1999 33	Oita Trinita	1-0 (GG) (a.e.t.)	Vegalta Sendai	Saiki Stadium
JST (UTC+09)

6 November 1999 34	Albirex Niigata	2-1 (GG) (a.e.t.)	Oita Trinita	Niigata City Athletic Stadium
JST (UTC+09)

13 November 1999 35	Oita Trinita	3-2	Sagan Tosu	Oita Athletic Stadium
JST (UTC+09)

21 November 1999 36	Oita Trinita	1-1 (GG) (a.e.t.)	Montedio Yamagata	Oita Athletic Stadium
JST (UTC+09)

=== Emperor's Cup ===
28 November 1999 1st Round	Hiroshima University	0-6	Oita Trinita	Fukuyama Takegahana Stadium
JST (UTC+09)

5 December 1999 2nd Round	Oita Trinita	10-0	ALO's Hokuriku	Saiki Stadium
JST (UTC+09)

12 December 1999 3rd Round	Kyoto Purple Sanga	1-0	Oita Trinita	Nishikyogoku Athletic Stadium
JST (UTC+09)

=== J.League Cup ===
7 April 1999 1st Round-1	Oita Trinita	2-1	Bellmare Hiratsuka	Oita Athletic Stadium
JST (UTC+09)

14 April 1999 1st Round-2	Bellmare Hiratsuka	0-0 (1-2 agg.)	Oita Trinita	Hiratsuka Athletics Stadium
JST (UTC+09)

12 June 1999 2nd Round-1	Oita Trinita	1-0	Urawa Red Diamonds	Oita Athletic Stadium
JST (UTC+09)

19 June 1999 2nd Round-2	Urawa Red Diamonds	3-1 (3-2 agg.)	Oita Trinita	Urawa Komaba Stadium
JST (UTC+09)

== Player statistics ==
No.	Pos.	Nat.	Player	D.o.B. (Age)	Height / Weight	J.League 2		Emperor's Cup		J.League Cup		Total	
No.	Pos.	Nat.	Player	D.o.B. (Age)	Height / Weight	Apps	Goals	Apps	Goals	Apps	Goals	Apps	Goals
1	GK	(Japan)	Kenji Koyama	September 5, 1972 (aged 26)	cm / kg	36	0						
2	DF	(Japan)	Yuji Nakayoshi	September 4, 1972 (aged 26)	cm / kg	2	0						
3	DF	(Japan)	Kazuhiro Murata	May 12, 1969 (aged 29)	cm / kg	29	1						
4	DF	(Japan)	Yasunari Hiraoka	March 13, 1972 (aged 27)	cm / kg	26	0						
5	DF	(Japan)	Daiki Wakamatsu	August 2, 1976 (aged 22)	cm / kg	25	3						
6	MF	(Japan)	Takayuki Tateishi	July 8, 1969 (aged 29)	cm / kg	0	0						
7	MF	(Japan)	Motoki Kawasaki	February 2, 1979 (aged 20)	cm / kg	13	3						
8	MF	(Japan)	Iwao Yamane	July 31, 1976 (aged 22)	cm / kg	32	1						
9	MF	(South Korea)	Choi Dae-Shik	January 10, 1965 (aged 34)	cm / kg	31	4						
10	FW	(Brazil)	Will	December 15, 1973 (aged 25)	cm / kg	30	18						
11	MF	(Japan)	Taketo Shiokawa	December 17, 1977 (aged 21)	cm / kg	34	5						
12	DF	(Japan)	Tetsuya Yamazaki	July 25, 1978 (aged 20)	cm / kg	22	1						
13	FW	(Japan)	Shingo Mizushima	May 27, 1978 (aged 20)	cm / kg	0	0						
14	FW	(Brazil)	Alex	April 20, 1976 (aged 22)	cm / kg	11	2						
14	MF	(Cameroon)	Edwin Ifeanyi	April 28, 1972 (aged 26)	cm / kg	18	1						
15	FW	(Japan)	Kazumasa Shimizu	June 30, 1976 (aged 22)	cm / kg	6	1						
16	MF	(Japan)	Keita Kanemoto	July 13, 1977 (aged 21)	cm / kg	29	0						
17	GK	(Japan)	Keisuke Yoshisaka	May 15, 1974 (aged 24)	cm / kg	0	0						
18	MF	(Japan)	Takashi Umeda	May 30, 1976 (aged 22)	cm / kg	28	1						
19	DF	(Japan)	Takahiro Tasaki	December 13, 1977 (aged 21)	cm / kg	0	0						
20	MF	(Japan)	Norio Murata	February 7, 1976 (aged 23)	cm / kg	4	0						
21	MF	(Japan)	Yoshinori Hyodo	September 19, 1979 (aged 19)	cm / kg	0	0						
22	GK	(Japan)	Daigo Kuroiwa	August 5, 1975 (aged 23)	cm / kg	0	0						
23	DF	(Japan)	Yuji Nakatsuru	May 21, 1979 (aged 19)	cm / kg	0	0						
24	MF	(Japan)	Kazuhisa Hamaoka	February 28, 1981 (aged 18)	cm / kg	1	0						
25	MF	(Japan)	Ryohei Koike	August 24, 1980 (aged 18)	cm / kg	1	0						
26	DF	(Japan)	Toshihiro Yoshimura	June 28, 1971 (aged 27)	cm / kg	32	0						
27	DF	(Japan)	Seiichi Akahoshi	September 6, 1980 (aged 18)	cm / kg	0	0						
28	FW	(Japan)	Takuya Jinno	June 1, 1970 (aged 28)	cm / kg	36	19						
29	MF	(Japan)	Yoshiki Ito	November 1, 1978 (aged 20)	cm / kg	0	0						
30	MF	(Japan)	Yoshiya Takemura	December 6, 1973 (aged 25)	cm / kg	22	1						

== Other pages ==
- (in Japanese) J. League official site
