= 1999 Vegalta Sendai season =

Vegalta Sendai
1999 season
- Chairman: Kyogoku Akira
- Manager: Takekazu Suzuki; Hidehiko Shimizu
- Stadium: Sendai Stadium
- J. League 2: 9th
- J.League Cup: First round
- Emperor's Cup: Second round
- Top goalscorer: Yoshinori Abe (7)
Home colours	Away colours

In Japanese professional football, the 1999 Vegalta Sendai season statistics are given here.

== Competitions ==
Competitions	Position
J.League 2	9th / 10 clubs
Emperor's Cup	2nd round
J.League Cup	1st round

== J.League 2 ==
=== League table ===
Pos	Team	Pld	W	OTW	D	OTL	L	GF	GA	GD	Pts
6	Omiya Ardija	36	14	4	1	2	15	47	44	+3	51
7	Montedio Yamagata	36	14	1	4	4	13	47	53	−6	48
8	Sagan Tosu	36	11	1	2	2	20	52	64	−12	37
9	Vegalta Sendai	36	7	3	4	4	18	30	58	−28	31
10	Ventforet Kofu	36	4	1	4	4	23	32	85	−53	18

Source: Official J.League statistics webpage

=== Results ===
14 March 1999 1	Vegalta Sendai	2–3	Montedio Yamagata	Sendai Stadium
JST (UTC+09)

21 March 1999 2	Vegalta Sendai	1–2	FC Tokyo	Sendai Stadium
JST (UTC+09)

28 March 1999 3	Ventforet Kofu	1–2	Vegalta Sendai	Nirasaki Central Park Stadium
JST (UTC+09)

4 April 1999 4	Vegalta Sendai	1–1 (a.e.t.)	Consadole Sapporo	Sendai Stadium
JST (UTC+09)

11 April 1999 5	Omiya Ardija	4–0	Vegalta Sendai	Omiya Football Stadium
JST (UTC+09)

18 April 1999 6	Sagan Tosu	0–1	Vegalta Sendai	Tosu Stadium
JST (UTC+09)

25 April 1999 7	Vegalta Sendai	1–3	Oita Trinita	Sendai Stadium
JST (UTC+09)

28 April 1999 8	Albirex Niigata	0–3	Vegalta Sendai	Niigata City Athletic Stadium
JST (UTC+09)

2 May 1999 9	Vegalta Sendai	0–2	Kawasaki Frontale	Sendai Stadium
JST (UTC+09)

5 May 1999 10	FC Tokyo	2–0	Vegalta Sendai	Nishigaoka Soccer Stadium
JST (UTC+09)

9 May 1999 11	Vegalta Sendai	1–2 (a.e.t.)	Ventforet Kofu	Sendai Stadium
JST (UTC+09)

16 May 1999 12	Consadole Sapporo	3–0	Vegalta Sendai	Sapporo Atsubetsu Park Stadium
JST (UTC+09)

23 May 1999 13	Vegalta Sendai	0–1 (a.e.t.)	Omiya Ardija	Sendai Stadium
JST (UTC+09)

29 May 1999 14	Vegalta Sendai	1–2	Sagan Tosu	Sendai Stadium
JST (UTC+09)

26 June 1999 15	Oita Trinita	2–0	Vegalta Sendai	Oita Athletic Stadium
JST (UTC+09)

4 July 1999 16	Vegalta Sendai	0–3	Albirex Niigata	Sendai Stadium
JST (UTC+09)

11 July 1999 17	Kawasaki Frontale	5–1	Vegalta Sendai	Todoroki Athletics Stadium
JST (UTC+09)

17 July 1999 18	Montedio Yamagata	2–1	Vegalta Sendai	Yamagata Park Stadium
JST (UTC+09)

1 August 1999 19	Consadole Sapporo	2–0	Vegalta Sendai	Sapporo Atsubetsu Park Stadium
JST (UTC+09)

7 August 1999 20	Vegalta Sendai	0–3	Kawasaki Frontale	Sendai Stadium
JST (UTC+09)

15 August 1999 21	Ventforet Kofu	1–2	Vegalta Sendai	Kose Sports Park Stadium
JST (UTC+09)

21 August 1999 22	Vegalta Sendai	2–1	Omiya Ardija	Sendai Stadium
JST (UTC+09)

28 August 1999 23	Vegalta Sendai	1–2	Sagan Tosu	Sendai Stadium
JST (UTC+09)

4 September 1999 24	Albirex Niigata	0–1 (a.e.t.)	Vegalta Sendai	Niigata City Athletic Stadium
JST (UTC+09)

12 September 1999 25	Vegalta Sendai	1–2 (a.e.t.)	Oita Trinita	Sendai Stadium
JST (UTC+09)

15 September 1999 26	Montedio Yamagata	0–0 (a.e.t.)	Vegalta Sendai	Yamagata Park Stadium
JST (UTC+09)

19 September 1999 27	Vegalta Sendai	1–3	FC Tokyo	Sendai Stadium
JST (UTC+09)

26 September 1999 28	Kawasaki Frontale	3–1	Vegalta Sendai	Todoroki Athletics Stadium
JST (UTC+09)

3 October 1999 29	Vegalta Sendai	1–0 (a.e.t.)	Ventforet Kofu	Sendai Stadium
JST (UTC+09)

11 October 1999 30	Omiya Ardija	0–2	Vegalta Sendai	Tochigi Green Stadium
JST (UTC+09)

17 October 1999 31	Sagan Tosu	0–0 (a.e.t.)	Vegalta Sendai	Tosu Stadium
JST (UTC+09)

24 October 1999 32	Vegalta Sendai	0–1	Albirex Niigata	Sendai Stadium
JST (UTC+09)

31 October 1999 33	Oita Trinita	1–0 (a.e.t.)	Vegalta Sendai	Saiki Stadium
JST (UTC+09)

6 November 1999 34	Vegalta Sendai	1–1 (a.e.t.)	Montedio Yamagata	Sendai Stadium
JST (UTC+09)

14 November 1999 35	FC Tokyo	0–1	Vegalta Sendai	Komazawa Olympic Park Stadium
JST (UTC+09)

21 November 1999 36	Vegalta Sendai	1–0	Consadole Sapporo	Sendai Stadium
JST (UTC+09)

== Emperor's Cup ==
28 November 1999 1st Round	Honda Lock	0–5	Vegalta Sendai	Miyazaki Athletic Stadium
JST (UTC+09)

5 December 1999 2nd Round	Vegalta Sendai	1–2	Mito HollyHock	Sendai Stadium
JST (UTC+09)

== J.League Cup ==
7 April 1999 1st Round-1	Vegalta Sendai	1–2	Sanfrecce Hiroshima	Sendai Stadium
JST (UTC+09)

14 April 1999 1st Round-2	Sanfrecce Hiroshima	4–1 (6–2 agg.)	Vegalta Sendai	Hiroshima Stadium
JST (UTC+09)

== Player statistics ==
No.	Pos.	Nat.	Player	D.o.B. (Age)	Height / Weight	J.League 2		Emperor's Cup		J.League Cup		Total	
No.	Pos.	Nat.	Player	D.o.B. (Age)	Height / Weight	Apps	Goals	Apps	Goals	Apps	Goals	Apps	Goals
1	GK	(Japan)	Norio Takahashi	March 15, 1971 (aged 27)	cm / kg	12	0						
2	DF	(Japan)	Yoshihito Yamaji	January 13, 1971 (aged 28)	cm / kg	30	0						
3	DF	(Japan)	Katsuyuki Saito	April 7, 1973 (aged 25)	cm / kg	29	0						
4	DF	(Japan)	Yoshitaka Watanabe	April 18, 1973 (aged 25)	cm / kg	24	0						
5	DF	(Serbia and Montenegro)	Slobodan Dubajić	February 19, 1966 (aged 33)	cm / kg	30	1						
6	MF	(Japan)	Eiji Hanayama	August 21, 1977 (aged 21)	cm / kg	13	1						
7	MF	(Japan)	Naoki Chiba	July 24, 1977 (aged 21)	cm / kg	31	0						
8	MF	(Japan)	Kazuo Echigo	December 28, 1965 (aged 33)	cm / kg	26	0						
9	FW	(Japan)	Jun Takata	December 6, 1977 (aged 21)	cm / kg	20	4						
10	MF	(Japan)	Koji Nakajima	August 20, 1977 (aged 21)	cm / kg	26	2						
11	FW	(Japan)	Satoshi Taira	July 16, 1970 (aged 28)	cm / kg	30	2						
13	MF	(Japan)	Tomohiro Hasumi	June 6, 1972 (aged 26)	cm / kg	11	0						
14	MF	(Japan)	Yasunobu Chiba	April 11, 1971 (aged 27)	cm / kg	23	2						
15	MF	(Japan)	Manabu Nakamura	June 26, 1977 (aged 21)	cm / kg	22	1						
16	FW	(Japan)	Makoto Segawa	November 26, 1974 (aged 24)	cm / kg	27	2						
17	FW	(Japan)	Yoshinori Abe	September 10, 1972 (aged 26)	cm / kg	18	7						
18	DF	(Japan)	Kei Mikuriya	August 29, 1977 (aged 21)	cm / kg	28	0						
19	MF	(Japan)	Dan Ito	November 3, 1975 (aged 23)	cm / kg	7	0						
20	MF	(Japan)	Hiroaki Sato	April 16, 1979 (aged 19)	cm / kg	0	0						
21	GK	(Japan)	Tsuneyoshi Osaki	May 18, 1974 (aged 24)	cm / kg	0	0						
22	GK	(Japan)	Ken Ishikawa	February 6, 1970 (aged 29)	cm / kg	24	0						
23	FW	(Japan)	Seiki Aizawa	September 19, 1980 (aged 18)	cm / kg	0	0						
24	DF	(Japan)	Eiki Onodera	May 22, 1980 (aged 18)	cm / kg	0	0						
25	DF	(Japan)	Satoshi Sayama	May 27, 1980 (aged 18)	cm / kg	0	0						
26	MF	(Japan)	Motoki Imagawa	May 17, 1980 (aged 18)	cm / kg	3	0						
27	MF	(Colombia)	Nixon Perea	August 15, 1973 (aged 25)	cm / kg	24	3						
28	MF	(Brazil)	Paulo Henrique	February 21, 1972 (aged 27)	cm / kg	16	4						
29	MF	(Japan)	Nobuyuki Zaizen	October 19, 1976 (aged 22)	cm / kg	6	1						
