= List of Kawasaki Frontale records and statistics =

This article contains records and statistics for the Japanese professional football club, Kawasaki Frontale.

== J.League ==
Champions	Runners-up	Third place	Promoted	Relegated

Season	Division	Teams	Place	P	W	D	L	F	A	GD	Pts	Average Crowd/G
1999	J2	10	1st	36	25	3	8	69	34	35	73	5,396
2000	J1	16	16th	30	6	3	21	26	56	-30	21	7,439
2001	J2	12	7th	44	20	3	21	69	60	9	60	3,784
2002	J2	12	4th	44	23	11	10	71	53	18	80	5,247
2003	J2	12	3rd	44	24	13	7	88	47	41	85	7,258
2004	J2	12	1st	44	34	3	7	104	38	66	105	9,148
2005	J1	18	8th	34	15	5	14	54	47	7	50	13,658
2006	J1	18	2nd	34	20	7	7	84	55	59	67	14,340
2007	J1	18	5th	34	14	12	8	66	48	18	54	17,338
2008	J1	18	2nd	34	18	6	10	65	42	23	60	17,565
2009	J1	18	2nd	34	19	7	8	64	40	24	64	18,847
2010	J1	18	5th	34	15	9	10	61	47	14	54	18,562
2011	J1	18	11th	34	13	5	16	52	53	-1	44	17,340
2012	J1	18	8th	34	14	8	12	51	50	1	50	17,807
2013	J1	18	3rd	34	18	6	10	65	51	14	60	16,644
2014	J1	18	6th	34	16	7	11	56	43	13	55	16,661
2015	J1	18	5th	34	18	5	11	62	48	14	59	20,999
2016	J1	18	3rd	34	22	6	6	68	39	29	72	22,136
2017	J1	18	1st	34	21	9	4	71	32	39	72	22,112
2018	J1	18	1st	34	21	6	7	57	27	30	69	23,218
2019	J1	18	4th	34	16	12	6	57	34	23	60	23,272
2020 †	J1	18	1st	34	26	5	3	88	31	57	83	7,862
2021 †	J1	20	1st	38	28	8	2	81	28	53	92	7,342
2022	J1	18	2nd	34	20	6	8	65	42	23	66	17,939
2023	J1	18	8th	34	14	8	12	51	45	6	50	19,840
2024	J1	20	8th	38	13	13	12	66	57	9	52	21,076
2025	J1	20	8th	38	15	12	11	67	57	10	57	22,050
2026-27	J1	20	TBD	38								

Key

- Pos. = Position in league; P = Games played; W = Games won; D = Games drawn; L = Games lost; F = Goals scored; A = Goals conceded; GD = Goals difference; Pts = Points gained
- Attendance/G = Average home league attendance
- † 2020 & 2021 seasons attendances reduced by COVID-19 worldwide pandemic
- Source: J.League Data Site

== Domestic cup competitions ==
Year	J.League Cup	Emperor's Cup
1997	Did not enter	3rd round
1998	Group stage	3rd round
1999	1st round	4th round
2000	Runners-up	3rd round
2001	Quarter finals	Semi-finals
2002	Did not qualify	Quarter finals
2003	Did not qualify	4th round
2004	Did not qualify	5th round
2005	Group stage	Quarter finals
2006	Semi-finals	5th round
2007	Runners-up	Semi-finals
2008	Group stage	5th round
2009	Runners-up	Quarter finals
2010	Semi-finals	4th round
2011	2nd round	4th round
2012	Group stage	4th round
2013	Semi-finals	Quarter finals
2014	Semi-finals	3rd round
2015	Group stage	4th round
2016	Group stage	Runners-up
2017	Runners-up	Quarter finals
2018	Quarter finals	Quarter finals
2019	Winners	4th round
2020	Semi final	Winners
2021	Quarter finals	Semi-finals
2022	Quarter finals	3rd round
2023	Group Stage	Winners
2024	Semi-final	3rd round
2025	Semi-final	3rd round

== Japan Football League (JFL) ==
Season	League	Teams	Pos.	P	W (90min/ET/PK)	D	L (90min/ET/PK)	F	A	GD	Pts	Attendance/G
1997	JFL	16	3rd	30	23 (21/2/0)	-	7 (4/3/0)	87	36	51	67	
1998	JFL	16	2nd	30	23 (22/1/0)	-	7 (5/2/0)	72	24	48	68	

Key

- Points: 90min win – 3 points, Extra Time win (sudden death) – 2 points, PK win after Extra Time – 1 point, Any lost – 0 point
- In 1998, Kawasaki attended ""J1 Participation Tournament"", and lost at 1st round.

== Major international competitions ==
Season	Competition	Result	Attendance
2007	AFC Champions; League	Quarter finals	10,961
2009	AFC Champions; League	Quarter finals	13,029
2010	AFC Champions; League	Group stage	8,912
2014	AFC Champions; League	Round of 16	9,763
2017	AFC Champions; League	Quarter finals	13,175
2018	AFC Champions; League	Group stage	10,601
2019	AFC Champions; League	Group stage	10,933
2021	AFC Champions; League	Round of 16	0
2022	AFC Champions; League	Group stage	5,972
2023–24	AFC Champions; League	Round of 16	9,957

=== Continental record ===
Season	Competition	Round	Club	Home	Away	Aggregate
2007	AFC Champions League	Group F	(South Korea) Jeonnam Dragons	3–0	3–1	1st
2007	AFC Champions League	Group F	(Indonesia) Arema	3–0	3–1	1st
2007	AFC Champions League	Group F	(Thailand) Bangkok University	1–1	2–1	1st
2007	AFC Champions League	Quarter-finals	(Iran) Sepahan	0–0	0–0	0–0 (4–5p)
2009	AFC Champions League	Group H	(South Korea) Pohang Steelers	0–2	1–1	2nd
2009	AFC Champions League	Group H	(China) Tianjin Teda	1–0	1–3	2nd
2009	AFC Champions League	Group H	(Australia) Central Coast Mariners	2–1	5–1	2nd
2009	AFC Champions League	Round of 16	(Japan) Gamba Osaka	3–2		
2009	AFC Champions League	Quarter-finals	(Japan) Nagoya Grampus	2–1	1–3	3–4
2010	AFC Champions League	Group E	(South Korea) Seongnam Ilhwa Chunma	0–2	3–0	3rd
2010	AFC Champions League	Group E	(China) Beijing Guoan	1–3	0–2	3rd
2010	AFC Champions League	Group E	(Australia) Melbourne Victory	4–0	0–1	3rd
2014	AFC Champions League	Group H	(South Korea) Ulsan Hyundai	3–1	0–2	2nd
2014	AFC Champions League	Group H	(China) Guizhou Renhe	1–0	1–0	2nd
2014	AFC Champions League	Group H	(Australia) Western Sydney Wanderers	2–1	0–1	2nd
2014	AFC Champions League	Round of 16	(South Korea) FC Seoul	2–3	2–1	4–4(a)
2017	AFC Champions League	Group G	(China) Guangzhou Evergrande	0–0	1–1	1st
2017	AFC Champions League	Group G	(South Korea) Suwon Samsung Bluewings	1–1	1–0	1st
2017	AFC Champions League	Group G	(Hong Kong) Eastern	4–0	1–1	1st
2017	AFC Champions League	Round of 16	(Thailand) Muangthong United	4–1	3–1	7–2
2017	AFC Champions League	Quarter-finals	(Japan) Urawa Red Diamonds	3–1	1–4	4–5
2018	AFC Champions League	Group F	(South Korea) Ulsan Hyundai	2–2	1–2	4th
2018	AFC Champions League	Group F	(China) Shanghai SIPG	0–1	1–1	4th
2018	AFC Champions League	Group F	(Australia) Melbourne Victory	2–2	0–1	4th
2019	AFC Champions League	Group H	(South Korea) Ulsan Hyundai	2–2	0–1	3rd
2019	AFC Champions League	Group H	(China) Shanghai SIPG	2–2	0–1	3rd
2019	AFC Champions League	Group H	(Australia) Sydney FC	1–0	4–0	3rd
2021	AFC Champions League	Group I	(South Korea) Daegu FC	3–2	3–1	1st
2021	AFC Champions League	Group I	(China) Beijing Guoan	4–0	7–0	1st
2021	AFC Champions League	Group I	(Philippines) United City	8–0	2–0	1st
2021	AFC Champions League	Round of 16	(South Korea) Ulsan Hyundai	0–0(a.e.t.) (2–3 p)		
2022	AFC Champions League	Group I	(South Korea) Ulsan Hyundai	1–1	2–3	2nd
2022	AFC Champions League	Group I	(China) Guangzhou	1–0	8–0	2nd
2022	AFC Champions League	Group I	(Malaysia) Johor Darul Ta'zim	0–0	5–0	2nd
2023–24	AFC Champions League	Group I	(South Korea) Ulsan Hyundai	1–0	2–2	1st
2023–24	AFC Champions League	Group I	(Malaysia) Johor Darul Ta'zim	5–0	1–0	1st
2023–24	AFC Champions League	Group I	(Thailand) BG Pathum United	4–2	4–2	1st
2023–24	AFC Champions League	Round of 16	(China) Shandong Taishan	2–4	3–2	5–6
2024–25	AFC Champions League Elite	League stage	(South Korea) Ulsan HD	—N/a	1–0	2nd
2024–25	AFC Champions League Elite	League stage	(South Korea) Gwangju	0–1	—N/a	2nd
2024–25	AFC Champions League Elite	League stage	(China) Shanghai Shenhua	—N/a	0–2	2nd
2024–25	AFC Champions League Elite	League stage	(China) Shanghai Port	3–1	—N/a	2nd
2024–25	AFC Champions League Elite	League stage	(Thailand) Buriram United	—N/a	3–0	2nd
2024–25	AFC Champions League Elite	League stage	(China) Shandong Taishan	4–0 (Voided)	—N/a	2nd
2024–25	AFC Champions League Elite	League stage	(South Korea) Pohang Steelers	—N/a	4–0	2nd
2024–25	AFC Champions League Elite	League stage	(Australia) Central Coast Mariners	2–0	—N/a	2nd
2024–25	AFC Champions League Elite	Round of 16	(China) Shanghai Shenhua	4–0	0–1	4–1
2024–25	AFC Champions League Elite	Quarter-finals	(Qatar) Al Sadd	3–2(a.e.t.)		
2024–25	AFC Champions League Elite	Semi-finals	(Saudi Arabia) Al Nassr	3–2		
2024–25	AFC Champions League Elite	Final	(Saudi Arabia) Al-Ahli	0–2		

== Top scorers by season ==
Season	League	Player	Domestic league	Reference
1997	JFL	(Nigeria) Mutairu Momodu	21	
1998	JFL	(Brazil) Valdney	33	League Top Scorer
1999	J2	(Brazil) Tuto	17	
2000	J1	(Japan) Akira Konno	3	
2001	J2	(Brazil) Emerson	19	
2002	J2	(Brazil) Betinho	16	
2003	J2	(Brazil) Juninho	28	
2004	J2	(Brazil) Juninho	37	League Top Scorer
2005	J1	(Brazil) Juninho	16	
2006	J1	(Brazil) Juninho	20	
2007	J1	(Brazil) Juninho	22	League Top Scorer
2008	J1	(North Korea) Jong Tae-se	14	
2009	J1	(Brazil) Juninho	18	
2010	J1	(Brazil) Juninho	14	
2011	J1	(Japan) Yu Kobayashi	12	
2012	J1	(Brazil) Renato	10	
2013	J1	(Japan) Yoshito Ōkubo	26	League Top Scorer
2014	J1	(Japan) Yoshito Ōkubo	18	League Top Scorer
2015	J1	(Japan) Yoshito Ōkubo	23	League Top Scorer
2016	J1	(Japan) Yoshito Ōkubo (Japan) Yu Kobayashi	15	
2017	J1	(Japan) Yu Kobayashi	23	League Top Scorer
2018	J1	(Japan) Yu Kobayashi	15	
2019	J1	(Japan) Yu Kobayashi	13	
2020	J1	(Japan) Yu Kobayashi	14	
2021	J1	(Brazil) Leandro Damião	23	League Top Scorer
2022	J1	(Japan) Akihiro Ienaga (Brazil) Marcinho	12	
2023	J1	(Japan) Yasuto Wakizaka	9	
2024	J1	(Japan) Shin Yamada	19	
2025	J1	(Japan) Tatsuya Itō	13	
