= Yoshihito (name) =

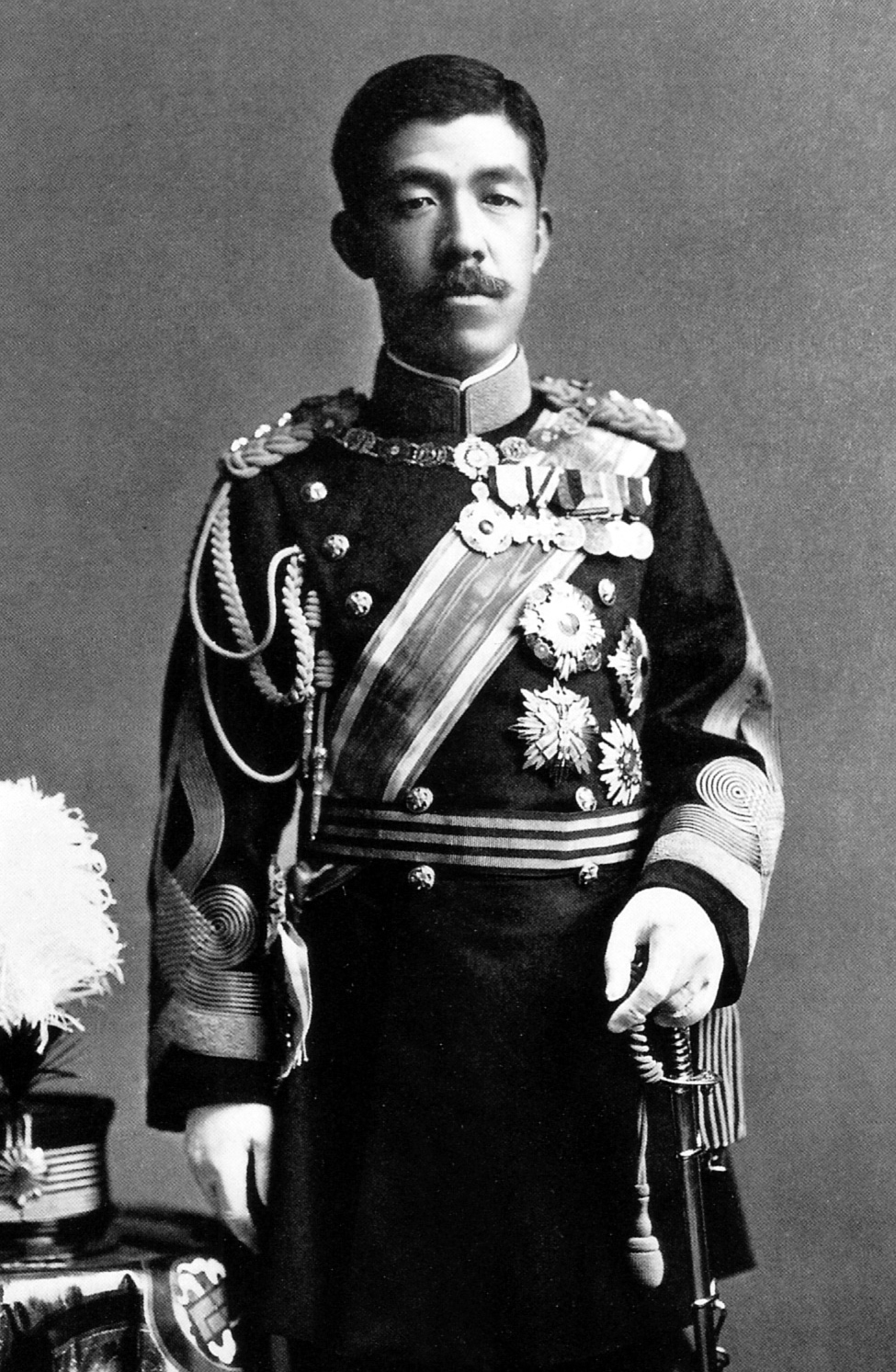
- Prince Yoshihito (1879–1926). Formal portrait, 1912.
- Pronunciation: joɕiçito (IPA)
- Gender: Male

Origin
- Origin: Japanese
- Meaning: Different meanings depending on the kanji used

Other names
- Alternative spelling: Yosihito (Kunrei-shiki) Yosihito (Nihon-shiki) Yoshihito (Hepburn)

Yoshihito is a masculine Japanese given name.

== Written forms ==
Yoshihito can be written using different combinations of kanji characters. Here are some examples:

- 義人, "justice, person"
- 義仁, "justice, benevolence"
- 吉人, "good luck, person"
- 吉仁, "good luck, benevolence"
- 善人, "virtuous, person"
- 善仁, "virtuous, benevolence"
- 芳人, "virtuous/fragrant, person"
- 芳仁, "virtuous/fragrant, benevolence"
- 良人, "good, person"
- 良仁, "good, benevolence"
- 喜仁, "rejoice, benevolence"
- 慶仁, "congratulate, benevolence"
- 佳仁, "skilled, benevolence"

The name can also be written in hiragana よしひと or katakana ヨシヒト.

== Notable people with the name ==
- Emperor Taishō, previously known as Prince Yoshihito (嘉仁, 1879–1926)
- Yoshihito, Prince Katsura (宜仁, 1948–2014), previously known as Prince Yoshihito of Mikasa, grandson of Emperor Taishō
- Yoshihito Onda (恩田 快人, born 1963), bassist and founder of the 1990s pop band Judy and Mary
- Yoshihito Fujita (藤田 祥史; born 1983), Japanese footballer
- Yoshihito Iizuka (飯塚 欣士; born 2001), Japanese footballer
- Yoshihito Ishii (石井 義人; born 1978), Japanese baseball infielder
- Yoshihito Nishioka (西岡 良仁; born 1995), Japanese tennis player
- Yoshihito Yamaji (山路 嘉人; born 1971), Japanese football player
- Yoshihito Yoshida (吉田 義人; born 1969), Japanese rugby union player
