= Daiki Wakamatsu =

Japanese footballer

Daiki Wakamatsu 若松 大樹
Personal information
- Full name: Daiki Wakamatsu
- Date of birth: August 2, 1976 (age 50)
- Place of birth: Aichi, Japan
- Height: 1.76 m (5 ft 9 1/2 in)
- Position: Defender

Youth career
- 1992–1994: Yokkaichi Chuo Technical High School

Senior career*
Years	Team	Apps	(Gls)
1995–1996	Cosmo Oil Yokkaichi	40	(1)
1997–1998	Montedio Yamagata	59	(11)
1998	→ Shimizu S-Pulse (loan)	0	(0)
1999–2003	Oita Trinita	111	(9)
2004	Omiya Ardija	27	(0)
Total		237	(21)
Medal record
Shimizu S-Pulse
Runner-up	Emperor's Cup	1998
- * Club domestic league appearances and goals

Daiki Wakamatsu (若松 大樹, Wakamatsu Daiki; born August 2, 1976) is a former Japanese football player.

== Playing career ==
Wakamatsu was born in Aichi Prefecture on August 2, 1976. After graduating from high school, he joined Japan Football League (JFL) club Cosmo Oil (later Cosmo Oil Yokkaichi) in 1995. He played many matches as right side back from first season. However the club was disbanded end of 1996 season. In 1997, he moved to JFL club Montedio Yamagata. He played as regular player in 2 seasons. In 1998, he moved to J1 League club Shimizu S-Pulse on loan. However he could not play at all in the match. In 1999, he moved to newly was promoted to J2 League club, Oita Trinita. He played as regular player and the club won the champions in 2002 and was promoted to J1 from 2003. However his opportunity to play decreased in 2003. In 2004, he moved to J2 club Omiya Ardija. He played many matches and retired at the end of the 2004 season.

== Career statistics ==
Appearances and goals by club, season and competition
Club	Season	League			Emperor's Cup		J.League Cup		Total	
Club	Season	Division	Apps	Goals	Apps	Goals	Apps	Goals	Apps	Goals
Cosmo Oil	1995	Football League	17	1	—		—		17	1
Cosmo Oil Yokkaichi	1996	Football League	23	0	3	0	—		26	0
Montedio Yamagata	1997	Football League	29	5	3	2	—		32	7
Montedio Yamagata	1998	Football League	30	6	4	0	—		34	6
Shimizu S-Pulse	1998	J1 League	0	0	0	0	0	0	0	0
Oita Trinita	1999	J2 League	25	3	1	0	2	0	28	3
Oita Trinita	2000	J2 League	29	2	3	0	1	0	33	2
Oita Trinita	2001	J2 League	8	1	3	0	0	0	11	1
Oita Trinita	2002	J2 League	35	3	2	0	—		37	3
Oita Trinita	2003	J1 League	14	0	1	0	3	0	18	0
Omiya Ardija	2004	J2 League	27	0	1	0	—		28	0
Career total			237	21	21	2	6	0	264	23
