= Yoshinori Abe =

Japanese footballer

Yoshinori Abe 阿部 良則
Personal information
- Full name: Yoshinori Abe
- Date of birth: September 10, 1972 (age 54)
- Place of birth: Fujisawa, Kanagawa, Japan
- Height: 1.72 m (5 ft 7 1/2 in)
- Position: Forward

Youth career
- 1988–1990: Yomiuri

Senior career*
Years	Team	Apps	(Gls)
1991–1995	Verdy Kawasaki	21	(1)
1995	Brummell Sendai	23	(13)
1996	Tosu Futures	22	(9)
1997	Verdy Kawasaki	11	(1)
1998–1999	Vegalta Sendai	39	(19)
2000	Shonan Bellmare	14	(1)
2001	Kawasaki Frontale	30	(4)
Total		160	(48)
Medal record
Verdy Kawasaki
Winner	Japan Soccer League	1991/92
Winner	J1 League	1993
Winner	J1 League	1994
Runner-up	J1 League	1995
Winner	JSL Cup	1991
Winner	J.League Cup	1992
Winner	J.League Cup	1993
Winner	J.League Cup	1994
Runner-up	Emperor's Cup	1991
Runner-up	Emperor's Cup	1992
- * Club domestic league appearances and goals

Yoshinori Abe (阿部 良則, Abe Yoshinori; born September 10, 1972) is a former Japanese football player.

== Playing career ==
Abe was born in Fujisawa on September 10, 1972. He joined Yomiuri (later Verdy Kawasaki) from youth team in 1991. Although his opportunity to play increased from first season, he could not regular player behind Japan national team players Kazuyoshi Miura and Nobuhiro Takeda. In 1995, he moved to Japan Football League (JFL) club Brummell Sendai (later Vegalta Sendai). He played many matches as forward. He moved to JFL club Tosu Futures in 1996 and returned to Verdy in 1997. In 1998, he moved to JFL club Brummell again. In 1999, the club was promoted to new league J2 League. From 2000, he played for J2 club Shonan Bellmare (2000) and Kawasaki Frontale (2001). He retired end of 2001 season.

== Club statistics ==
Club performance			League		Cup		League Cup		Total	
Season	Club	League	Apps	Goals	Apps	Goals	Apps	Goals	Apps	Goals
Japan			League		Emperor's Cup		J.League Cup		Total	
1991/92	Yomiuri	JSL Division 1	2	0	0	0	0	0	2	0
1992	Verdy Kawasaki	J1 League	-		2	0	4	0	6	0
1993	Verdy Kawasaki	J1 League	8	0	3	0	6	1	17	1
1994	Verdy Kawasaki	J1 League	11	1	0	0	0	0	11	1
1995	Verdy Kawasaki	J1 League	0	0	0	0	-		0	0
1995	Brummell Sendai	Football League	23	13	2	1	-		25	14
1996	Tosu Futures	Football League	22	9	0	0	-		22	9
1997	Verdy Kawasaki	J1 League	11	1	0	0	0	0	11	1
1998	Brummell Sendai	Football League	21	12	4	1	4	1	29	14
1999	Vegalta Sendai	J2 League	18	7	2	0	2	0	22	7
2000	Shonan Bellmare	J2 League	14	1	2	0	0	0	16	1
2001	Kawasaki Frontale	J2 League	30	4	5	5	1	0	36	9
Total			160	48	20	7	17	2	197	57
