= Toshihiro Yoshimura =

Japanese footballer

Toshihiro Yoshimura 吉村 寿洋
Personal information
- Full name: Toshihiro Yoshimura
- Date of birth: June 28, 1971 (age 55)
- Place of birth: Shizuoka, Japan
- Height: 1.75 m (5 ft 9 in)
- Position: Defender

Youth career
- 1987–1989: Tokai University Daiichi High School

Senior career*
Years	Team	Apps	(Gls)
1990–1994	Júbilo Iwata	17	(0)
1995–1997	Vissel Kobe	87	(0)
1998–2001	Oita Trinita	125	(2)
Total		229	(2)
Medal record
Júbilo Iwata
Runner-up	J.League Cup	1994
- * Club domestic league appearances and goals

Toshihiro Yoshimura (吉村 寿洋, Yoshimura Toshihiro; born June 28, 1971) is a former Japanese football player.

== Playing career ==
Yoshimura was born in Shizuoka Prefecture on June 28, 1971. After graduating from high school, he joined his local club Yamaha Motors (later Júbilo Iwata) in 1990. He debuted in 1991–92 season and played many matches as side back. However he could hardly play in the match from 1992. In 1995, he moved to Japan Football League (JFL) club Vissel Kobe. He became a regular player and played all matches in 1995 and 1996. The club was promoted to J1 League from 1997 and he also played as regular player in 1997. In 1998, he moved to JFL club Oita Trinity (later Oita Trinita). He played as regular player and the club was promoted to J2 League from 1999. He retired at the end of the 2001 season.

== Club statistics ==
Club performance			League		Cup		League Cup		Total	
Season	Club	League	Apps	Goals	Apps	Goals	Apps	Goals	Apps	Goals
Japan			League		Emperor's Cup		J.League Cup		Total	
1990/91	Yamaha Motors	JSL Division 1	0	0			0	0	0	0
1991/92	Yamaha Motors	JSL Division 1	16	0			0	0	16	0
1992	Yamaha Motors	Football League	0	0			-		0	0
1993	Yamaha Motors	Football League	1	0	1	0	4	0	6	0
1994	Júbilo Iwata	J1 League	0	0	0	0	0	0	0	0
1995	Vissel Kobe	Football League	30	0	3	0	-		33	0
1996	Vissel Kobe	Football League	30	0	3	0	-		33	0
1997	Vissel Kobe	J1 League	27	0	0	0	5	0	32	0
1998	Oita Trinity	Football League	24	1	3	0	-		27	1
1999	Oita Trinita	J2 League	32	0	3	0	4	0	39	0
2000	Oita Trinita	J2 League	37	0	3	0	1	0	41	0
2001	Oita Trinita	J2 League	32	1	3	0	2	0	37	1
Total			229	2	19	0	16	0	264	2
