= Yasunobu Chiba =

Japanese footballer

Yasunobu Chiba 千葉 泰伸
Personal information
- Full name: Yasunobu Chiba
- Date of birth: April 11, 1971 (age 55)
- Place of birth: Ishinomaki, Miyagi, Japan
- Height: 1.72 m (5 ft 7 1/2 in)
- Position: Midfielder

Youth career
- 1987–1989: Ishinomaki Technical High School
- 1990–1993: Juntendo University

Senior career*
| Years | Team | Apps | (Gls) |
| 1994–1995 | Toshiba | 31 | (2) |
| 1996–1999 | Vegalta Sendai | 76 | (9) |
| Total | | 107 | (11) |

Managerial career
- 2012-2016: Vegalta Sendai Ladies
- 2018: Mynavi Vegalta Sendai Ladies
- * Club domestic league appearances and goals

Yasunobu Chiba (千葉 泰伸, Chiba Yasunobu; born April 11, 1971) is a former Japanese football player and manager.

== Playing career ==
Chiba was born in Ishinomaki on April 11, 1971. After graduating from Juntendo University, he joined Japan Football League (JFL) club Toshiba in 1994. He played many matches as offensive midfielder from first season. In 1996, he moved to his local club Brummell Sendai in JFL. He played many matches and the club was promoted to J2 League from 1999. He retired end of 1999 season.

== Coaching career ==
Despite the name change, he managed MyNavi Sendai Ladies twice.

== Club statistics ==
| Club performance | | | League | | Cup | | League Cup | | Total | |
| Season | Club | League | Apps | Goals | Apps | Goals | Apps | Goals | Apps | Goals |
| Japan | | | League | | Emperor's Cup | | J.League Cup | | Total | |
|---|---|---|---|---|---|---|---|---|---|---|
| 1994 | Toshiba | Football League | 14 | 0 | 1 | 0 | - | | 15 | 0 |
| 1995 | Toshiba | Football League | 17 | 2 | 0 | 0 | - | | 17 | 2 |
| 1996 | Brummell Sendai | Football League | 17 | 3 | 3 | 1 | - | | 20 | 4 |
| 1997 | Brummell Sendai | Football League | 17 | 2 | 2 | 0 | 6 | 0 | 25 | 2 |
| 1998 | Brummell Sendai | Football League | 19 | 2 | 0 | 0 | 0 | 0 | 19 | 2 |
| 1999 | Vegalta Sendai | J2 League | 23 | 2 | 0 | 0 | 1 | 0 | 24 | 2 |
| Total | | | 107 | 11 | 6 | 1 | 7 | 0 | 120 | 12 |
