= Taketo Shiokawa =

Japanese footballer

Taketo Shiokawa 塩川 岳人
Personal information
- Full name: Taketo Shiokawa
- Date of birth: December 17, 1977 (age 48)
- Place of birth: Shizuoka, Japan
- Height: 1.68 m (5 ft 6 in)
- Position: Midfielder

Youth career
- 1993–1995: Shizuoka Gakuen High School

Senior career*
Years	Team	Apps	(Gls)
1996–1998	Montedio Yamagata	68	(18)
1999	Oita Trinita	34	(5)
2000–2004	Kawasaki Frontale	91	(7)
2005–2007	Yokohama F. Marinos	6	(1)
2007–2008	Tokushima Vortis	42	(0)
Total		241	(31)
Medal record
Kawasaki Frontale
Runner-up	J.League Cup	2000
- * Club domestic league appearances and goals

Taketo Shiokawa (塩川 岳人, Shiokawa Taketo; born December 17, 1977) is a former Japanese football player.

== Playing career ==
Shiokawa was born in Shizuoka Prefecture on December 17, 1977. After graduating from Shizuoka Gakuen High School, he joined Japan Football League club Montedio Yamagata in 1996. He played many matches as forward from first season. In 1999, he moved to newly was promoted to J2 League club, Oita Trinita. He became a regular player as right wing. In 2000, he moved to J1 League club Kawasaki Frontale. Although he could hardly play in the match in 2000 and the club was relegated to J2 from 2001, he became a regular player as left side midfielder from 2001. However his opportunity to play decreased behind Augusto from 2003. Although the club won the champions in 2004 and was promoted to J1 from 2005, he could hardly play in the match and he left the club end of 2004 season. In 2005, he moved to J1 club Yokohama F. Marinos. However he could hardly play in the match. In May 2007, he moved to J2 club Tokushima Vortis. He played many matches as regular player in 2007. However his opportunity to play decreased in 2008 and he retired end of 2008 season.

== Career statistics ==
Appearances and goals by club, season and competition
Club	Season	League			Emperor's Cup		J.League Cup		Total	
Club	Season	Division	Apps	Goals	Apps	Goals	Apps	Goals	Apps	Goals
Montedio Yamagata	1996	Football League	20	4	2	0	—		22	4
Montedio Yamagata	1997	Football League	19	3	3	2	—		22	5
Montedio Yamagata	1998	Football League	29	11	4	1	—		33	12
Oita Trinita	1999	J2 League	34	5	3	1	4	2	41	8
Kawasaki Frontale	2000	J1 League	4	0	0	0	6	0	10	0
Kawasaki Frontale	2001	J2 League	28	3	6	0	2	0	36	3
Kawasaki Frontale	2002	J2 League	38	4	5	1	—		43	5
Kawasaki Frontale	2003	J2 League	19	0	4	0	—		23	0
Kawasaki Frontale	2004	J2 League	2	0	2	0	—		4	0
Yokohama F. Marinos	2005	J1 League	3	1	0	0	0	0	3	1
Yokohama F. Marinos	2006	J1 League	3	0	0	0	2	1	5	1
Yokohama F. Marinos	2007	J1 League	0	0	0	0	0	0	0	0
Tokushima Vortis	2007	J2 League	33	0	2	0	—		35	0
Tokushima Vortis	2008	J2 League	9	0	0	0	—		9	0
Career total			241	31	31	5	14	3	286	39

== J.League Firsts ==
- Appearance: March 14, 1999. Oita Trinita 1 v 0 Consadole Sapporo, Oita Stadium
- Goal: March 21, 1999. Oita Trinita 1 v 0 Kawasaki Frontale, Oita Stadium
