= Satoshi Taira =

Japanese footballer

Satoshi Taira 平 聡
Personal information
- Full name: Satoshi Taira
- Date of birth: July 16, 1970 (age 56)
- Place of birth: Hanamaki, Iwate, Japan
- Height: 1.82 m (5 ft 11 1/2 in)
- Position: Forward

Youth career
- 1986–1988: Morioka Commercial High School
- 1989–1992: Juntendo University

Senior career*
| Years | Team | Apps | (Gls) |
| 1993–1999 | Vegalta Sendai | 66 | (14) |
| 2000–2003 | Morioka Zebra | | |
| 2004 | Nippon Steel Kamaishi | | |
| Total | | 66 | (14) |
- * Club domestic league appearances and goals

Satoshi Taira (平 聡, Taira Satoshi; born July 16, 1970) is a former Japanese football player.

== Playing career ==
Taira was born in Hanamaki on July 16, 1970. After graduating from Juntendo University, he joined Regional Leagues club Tohoku Electric Power (later Brummell Sendai, Vegalta Sendai) in 1993. He played many matches as forward and the club was promoted to Japan Football League from 1995. Although his opportunity to play decreased for injuries, he became a regular player from 1998 and the club was promoted to J2 League from 1999. From 2000, he played for his local club Morioka Zebra (2000–03) and Nippon Steel Kamaishi (2004) in Regional Leagues. He retired end of 2004 season.

== Career statistics ==
Appearances and goals by club, season and competition
| Club | Season | League | | | Emperor's Cup | | J.League Cup | | Total | |
| Club | Season | Division | Apps | Goals | Apps | Goals | Apps | Goals | Apps | Goals |
|---|---|---|---|---|---|---|---|---|---|---|
| Tohoku Electric Power | 1993 | Regional Leagues | | | | | | | | |
| Tohoku Electric Power | 1994 | Regional Leagues | | | | | | | | |
| Brummell Sendai | 1995 | Football League | 14 | 1 | 5 | 2 | - | | 19 | 3 |
| Brummell Sendai | 1996 | Football League | 3 | 1 | 2 | 3 | - | | 5 | 4 |
| Brummell Sendai | 1997 | Football League | 0 | 0 | 2 | 0 | 0 | 0 | 2 | 0 |
| Brummell Sendai | 1998 | Football League | 19 | 10 | 0 | 0 | 4 | 1 | 23 | 11 |
| Vegalta Sendai | 1999 | J2 League | 30 | 2 | 2 | 1 | 0 | 0 | 32 | 3 |
| Career total | | | 66 | 14 | 11 | 6 | 4 | 1 | 81 | 21 |
