= Motoki Kawasaki =

Japanese footballer

Motoki Kawasaki 川崎 元気
Personal information
- Full name: Motoki Kawasaki
- Date of birth: February 2, 1979 (age 47)
- Place of birth: Oita, Japan
- Height: 1.82 m (5 ft 11 1/2 in)
- Position: Midfielder

Youth career
- 1994–1996: Oita High School

Senior career*
Years	Team	Apps	(Gls)
1997–2001	Oita Trinita	102	(15)
2001	Gamba Osaka	0	(0)
2002–2003	Sagan Tosu	74	(7)
2004–2005	ALO'S Hokuriku	45	(14)
2006–2007	Banditonce Kobe	27	(10)
2008–2010	V-Varen Nagasaki	73	(9)
Total		321	(55)
- * Club domestic league appearances and goals

Motoki Kawasaki (川崎 元気, Kawasaki Motoki; born February 2, 1979) is a former Japanese football player.

== Playing career ==
Kawasaki was born in Oita Prefecture on February 2, 1979. After graduating from high school, he joined the Japan Football League club Oita Trinity (later Oita Trinita) based in his local area in 1997. He played many matches as offensive midfielder from his first season and the club was promoted to the new J2 League in 1999. In July 2001, he moved to the J1 League club Gamba Osaka. However he did not play in any matches. In 2002, he moved to the J2 club Sagan Tosu. He became a regular player as an offensive midfielder and played often over two seasons. In 2004, he moved to the Japan Football League (JFL) club ALO'S Hokuriku. Although he played often in 2004, his opportunity to play decreased in 2005. In 2006, he moved to the Regional Leagues club Banditonce Kobe. He played as a regular player for two seasons. In 2008, he moved to the Regional Leagues club V-Varen Nagasaki. He played in many matches and the club was promoted to the JFL in 2009. He retired at the end of the 2010 season.

== Career statistics ==
Appearances and goals by club, season and competition
Club	Season	League			Emperor's Cup		J.League Cup		Total	
Club	Season	Division	Apps	Goals	Apps	Goals	Apps	Goals	Apps	Goals
Oita Trinity	1997	Football League	15	2	2	0	-		17	2
Oita Trinity	1998	Football League	25	5	3	0	-		28	5
Oita Trinita	1999	J2 League	13	3	2	1	0	0	15	4
Oita Trinita	2000	J2 League	38	5	2	1	2	1	42	7
Oita Trinita	2001	J2 League	11	0	0	0	3	0	14	0
Gamba Osaka	2001	J1 League	0	0	0	0	0	0	0	0
Sagan Tosu	2002	J2 League	39	3	3	0	-		42	3
Sagan Tosu	2003	J2 League	35	4	1	0	-		36	4
ALO'S Hokuriku	2004	Football League	29	9	2	0	-		31	9
ALO'S Hokuriku	2005	Football League	16	5	1	0	-		17	5
Banditonce Kobe	2006	Regional Leagues	13	3	4	0	-		17	3
Banditonce Kobe	2007	Regional Leagues	14	7	3	0	-		17	7
V-Varen Nagasaki	2008	Regional Leagues	17	6	-		-		17	6
V-Varen Nagasaki	2009	Football League	23	2	2	0	-		25	2
V-Varen Nagasaki	2010	Football League	33	1	1	0	-		34	1
Career total			321	55	26	2	5	1	352	58
