= Yoshitaka Watanabe =

Japanese footballer

Yoshitaka Watanabe 渡辺 佳孝
Personal information
- Full name: Yoshitaka Watanabe
- Date of birth: April 18, 1973 (age 53)
- Place of birth: Miyagi, Japan
- Height: 1.80 m (5 ft 11 in)
- Position: Defender

Youth career
- 1989–1991: Miyagi Technical High School
- 1992–1995: Juntendo University

Senior career*
Years	Team	Apps	(Gls)
1996–1999	Vegalta Sendai	46	(1)
Total		46	(1)
- * Club domestic league appearances and goals

Yoshitaka Watanabe (渡辺 佳孝, Watanabe Yoshitaka; born April 18, 1973) is a former Japanese football player.

== Playing career ==
Watanabe was born in Miyagi Prefecture on April 18, 1973. After graduating from Juntendo University, he joined Japan Football League club Brummell Sendai (later Vegalta Sendai) based in his local in 1996. Although he could not play at all in the match until 1997, he played many matches as center back and left side back from 1998. The club was also promoted to J2 League from 1999. However he left the club at the end of the 1999 season.

== Career statistics ==
Appearances and goals by club, season and competition
Club	Season	League			Emperor's Cup		J.League Cup		Total	
Club	Season	Division	Apps	Goals	Apps	Goals	Apps	Goals	Apps	Goals
Brummell Sendai	1996	Football League	0	0	0	0	—		0	0
Brummell Sendai	1997	Football League	0	0	0	0	0	0	0	0
Brummell Sendai	1998	Football League	22	1	4	0	4	0	30	1
Vegalta Sendai	1999	J2 League	24	0	2	0	2	0	28	0
Career total			46	1	6	0	6	0	58	1
