= Yoshiya Takemura =

Japanese footballer

Yoshiya Takemura 竹村 栄哉
Personal information
- Full name: Yoshiya Takemura
- Date of birth: December 6, 1973 (age 52)
- Place of birth: Miyoshi, Hiroshima, Japan
- Height: 1.70 m (5 ft 7 in)
- Position: Midfielder

Youth career
- 1989–1991: Sanyo High School

Senior career*
Years	Team	Apps	(Gls)
1992–1997	Bellmare Hiratsuka	23	(1)
1998–1999	Mito HollyHock	24	(9)
1999–2001	Oita Trinita	98	(8)
2002–2003	Omiya Ardija	25	(0)
2004–2006	Sagan Tosu	60	(6)
2007–2010	V-Varen Nagasaki	60	(3)
Total		290	(27)
Medal record
Bellmare Hiratsuka
Winner	Emperor's Cup	1994
- * Club domestic league appearances and goals

Yoshiya Takemura (竹村 栄哉, Takemura Yoshiya; born December 6, 1973) is a former Japanese football player.

== Playing career ==
Takemura was born in Miyoshi on December 6, 1973. After graduating from high school, he joined Fujita Industries (later Bellmare Hiratsuka) in 1992. Although he played as offensive midfielder, he could not become a regular player. In 1998, he moved to Mito HollyHock. In May 1999, he moved to Oita Trinita. He played as regular player for the club in 3 seasons. In 2002, he moved to Omiya Ardija. Although he played many matches in 2002, he could hardly play in the match in 2003. In 2004, he moved to Sagan Tosu. Although he played as regular player in 2004, his opportunity to play decreased from 2005. In 2007, he moved to Regional Leagues club V-Varen Nagasaki. He played many matches and the club was promoted to Japan Football League from 2009. He retired end of 2010 season.

== Club statistics ==
Club performance			League		Cup		League Cup		Total	
Season	Club	League	Apps	Goals	Apps	Goals	Apps	Goals	Apps	Goals
Japan			League		Emperor's Cup		J.League Cup		Total	
1992	Fujita Industries	Football League	1	0	0	0	-		1	0
1993	Fujita Industries	Football League	0	0	0	0	-		0	0
1994	Bellmare Hiratsuka	J1 League	1	0	0	0	0	0	1	0
1995	Bellmare Hiratsuka	J1 League	13	1	1	0	-		14	1
1996	Bellmare Hiratsuka	J1 League	1	0	0	0	0	0	1	0
1997	Bellmare Hiratsuka	J1 League	7	0	0	0	0	0	7	0
Total			23	1	1	0	0	0	24	1
1998	Mito HollyHock	Football League	19	5	2	0	-		21	5
1999	Mito HollyHock	Football League	5	4	0	0	-		5	4
Total			24	9	2	0	-		26	9
1999	Oita Trinita	J2 League	22	1	3	0	2	0	27	1
2000	Oita Trinita	J2 League	39	5	3	0	2	0	44	5
2001	Oita Trinita	J2 League	37	2	3	0	2	0	42	2
Total			98	8	9	0	6	0	113	8
2002	Omiya Ardija	J2 League	21	0	1	0	-		22	0
2003	Omiya Ardija	J2 League	4	0	0	0	-		4	0
Total			25	0	1	0	-		26	0
2004	Sagan Tosu	J2 League	41	6	2	2	-		43	8
2005	Sagan Tosu	J2 League	16	0	0	0	-		16	0
2006	Sagan Tosu	J2 League	3	0	0	0	-		3	0
Total			60	6	2	2	-		62	8
2007	V-Varen Nagasaki	Regional Leagues	17	0	3	1	-		20	1
2008	V-Varen Nagasaki	Regional Leagues	17	2	-		-		17	2
2009	V-Varen Nagasaki	Football League	17	1	0	0	-		17	1
2010	V-Varen Nagasaki	Football League	9	0	1	0	-		10	0
Total			60	3	4	1	-		64	4
Career total			290	27	19	3	6	0	315	30
