= Kazuhisa Hamaoka =

Japanese footballer (born 1981)

Kazuhisa Hamaoka 濱岡 和久
Personal information
- Full name: Kazuhisa Hamaoka
- Date of birth: February 28, 1981 (age 45)
- Place of birth: Nagasaki, Japan
- Height: 1.65 m (5 ft 5 in)
- Position: Midfielder

Youth career
- 1996–1998: Chinzei Gakuin High School

Senior career*
Years	Team	Apps	(Gls)
1999–2000	Oita Trinita	1	(0)
2001–2006	Ehime FC	162	(27)
2007	Sagawa Printing	32	(6)
2008	Banditonce Kakogawa	14	(8)
2010–2013	Tochigi Uva FC	126	(17)
2014	Nara Club	2	(0)
2014	MIO Biwako Shiga	12	(2)
2015–2016	Tochigi Uva FC	37	(3)
Total		386	(63)
- * Club domestic league appearances and goals

Kazuhisa Hamaoka (濱岡 和久, Hamaoka Kazuhisa; born February 28, 1981) is a former Japanese football player.

== Playing career ==
Hamaoka was born in Nagasaki Prefecture on February 28, 1981. After graduating from high school, he joined newly was promoted to J2 League club, Oita Trinita in 1999. On August 1, he debuted as substitute midfielder from the 83rd minute against Montedio Yamagata. However he could hardly play in the match until 2000. In 2001, he moved to newly was promoted to Japan Football League (JFL) club, Ehime FC. He became a regular player and played many matches as midfielder. The club also won the champions in 2005 and was promoted to J2 from 2006. In 2007, he moved to JFL club Sagawa Printing and played as regular player in 1 season. In 2008, he moved to Regional Leagues club Banditonce Kakogawa and played in 1 season. After 1 year blank, he joined JFL club Tochigi Uva FC in 2010. He played many matches as regular player in 4 seasons. In 2014, he moved to Regional Leagues club Nara Club in 2014. In July he moved to JFL club MIO Biwako Shiga. In 2015, he moved to JFL club Tochigi Uva FC again. He played as regular player and left the club in August 2016.

== Career statistics ==
Appearances and goals by club, season and competition
Club	Season	League			Emperor's Cup		J. League Cup		Total	
Club	Season	Division	Apps	Goals	Apps	Goals	Apps	Goals	Apps	Goals
Oita Trinita	1999	J2 League	1	0	2	0	0	0	3	0
Oita Trinita	2000	J2 League	0	0	0	0	0	0	0	0
Oita Trinita	Total		1	0	2	0	0	0	3	0
Ehime FC	2001	Football League	28	5	1	0	-		29	5
Ehime FC	2002	Football League	16	4	2	2	-		18	6
Ehime FC	2003	Football League	30	9	2	0	-		32	9
Ehime FC	2004	Football League	27	2	2	0	-		29	2
Ehime FC	2005	Football League	30	6	2	1	-		32	7
Ehime FC	2006	J2 League	31	1	0	0	-		31	1
Ehime FC	Total		162	27	9	3	-		171	30
Sagawa Printing	2007	Football League	32	6	2	0	-		34	6
Banditonce Kakogawa	2008	Regional Leagues	14	8	1	0	-		15	8
Tochigi Uva FC	2010	Football League	32	5	1	0	-		33	5
Tochigi Uva FC	2011	Football League	32	5	2	0	-		34	5
Tochigi Uva FC	2012	Football League	29	4	0	0	-		29	4
Tochigi Uva FC	2013	Football League	33	3	2	0	-		35	3
Tochigi Uva FC	Total		126	17	3	0	-		129	17
Nara Club	2014	Regional Leagues	2	0	-		-		2	0
MIO Biwako Shiga	2014	Football League	12	2	-		-		12	2
Tochigi Uva FC	2015	Football League	27	2	1	0	-		28	2
Tochigi Uva FC	2016	Football League	10	1	0	0	-		10	1
Tochigi Uva FC	Total		37	3	1	0	-		38	3
Career total			386	63	20	3	0	0	406	66
