= Masao Tsuji =

Japanese footballer (born 1987)

Masao Tsuji 辻 正男
Personal information
- Full name: Masao Tsuji
- Date of birth: 29 March 1987 (age 39)
- Place of birth: Fujisawa, Kanagawa, Japan
- Height: 1.73 m (5 ft 8 in)
- Position: Forward

Youth career
- 2006–2009: Hosei University

Senior career*
Years	Team	Apps	(Gls)
2009–2012	YSCC Yokohama	50	(37)
2013	Gainare Tottori	9	(0)
2014–2015	Zweigen Kanazawa	25	(5)
2016–2018	YSCC Yokohama	37	(17)
2019	Thespakusatsu Gunma	6	(0)
- * Club domestic league appearances and goals as of 16 August 2020

Masao Tsuji (辻 正男, Tsuji, Masao; born 29 March 1987 in Fujisawa, Kanagawa) is a Japanese footballer who plays for YSCC Yokohama.

== Club statistics ==
Updated to 23 February 2018.

Club performance			League		Cup		Total	
Season	Club	League	Apps	Goals	Apps	Goals	Apps	Goals
Japan			League		Emperor's Cup		Total	
2009	YSCC Yokohama	JRL (Kantō, Div. 1)	0	0	–		0	0
2010	YSCC Yokohama	JRL (Kantō, Div. 1)	11	11	1	0	12	11
2011	YSCC Yokohama	JRL (Kantō, Div. 1)	14	6	1	0	15	6
2012	YSCC Yokohama	JFL	25	20	1	1	26	21
2013	Gainare Tottori	J2 League	9	0	0	0	9	0
2014	Zweigen Kanazawa	J3 League	10	4	0	0	10	4
2015	Zweigen Kanazawa	J2 League	15	1	0	0	15	1
2016	YSCC Yokohama	J3 League	7	3	–		7	3
2017	YSCC Yokohama	J3 League	30	14	0	0	30	14
Career total			121	59	3	1	124	60
