= Luciano (footballer, born 1977) =

Brazilian footballer

Personal information
- Full name: Luciano Asley Rocha Carlos
- Date of birth: June 19, 1977 (age 49)
- Place of birth: Brazil
- Height: 1.81 m (5 ft 11 1/2 in)
- Position: Midfielder

Senior career*
Years	Team	Apps	(Gls)
2000	Oita Trinita	7	(1)
2000	Sagan Tosu	15	(9)
2001	Oita Trinita	9	(1)
Total		31	(11)
- * Club domestic league appearances and goals

Luciano Asley Rocha Carlos (born June 19, 1977) is a former Brazilian football player.

== Playing career ==
Luciano joined J2 League club Oita Trinita as Valdney's successor in May 2000. He played many matches as a regular midfielder. In July 2000, he moved to the J2 club, Sagan Tosu. He played until the end of the 2000 season and scored many goals. In August 2001, he rejoined Trinita. However, he was unable to play many matches and left the club at the end of the 2001 season.

== Club statistics ==
Club performance			League		Cup		League Cup		Total	
Season	Club	League	Apps	Goals	Apps	Goals	Apps	Goals	Apps	Goals
Japan			League		Emperor's Cup		J.League Cup		Total	
2000	Oita Trinita	J2 League	7	1			0	0	7	1
2000	Sagan Tosu	J2 League	15	9			0	0	15	9
2001	Oita Trinita	J2 League	9	1			0	0	9	1
Total			31	11	0	0	0	0	31	11
