= Yoshihito Yamaji =

Japanese footballer

Yoshihito Yamaji 山路 嘉人
Personal information
- Full name: Yoshihito Yamaji
- Date of birth: January 13, 1971 (age 55)
- Place of birth: Higashimatsushima, Japan
- Height: 1.80 m (5 ft 11 in)
- Position: Defender

Youth career
- 1986–1988: Ishinomaki Commercial High School
- 1989–1992: Kokushikan University

Senior career*
Years	Team	Apps	(Gls)
1993–1995	Toshiba	34	(3)
1996–2000	Vegalta Sendai	100	(2)
Total		134	(5)
- * Club domestic league appearances and goals

Yoshihito Yamaji (山路 嘉人, Yamaji Yoshihito; born January 13, 1971) is a Japanese former football player.

== Playing career ==
Yamaji was born in Higashimatsushima on January 13, 1971. After graduating from Kokushikan University, he joined Japan Football League (JFL) club Toshiba in 1993. He played several matches from first season and became a regular player as center back in 1995. In 1996, he moved to JFL club Brummell Sendai (later Vegalta Sendai) based in his local. He played as regular player from first season and the club was promoted to J2 League from 1999. His opportunity to play decreased in 2000 and he retired at the end of the 2000 season.

== Club statistics ==
Club performance			League		Cup		League Cup		Total	
Season	Club	League	Apps	Goals	Apps	Goals	Apps	Goals	Apps	Goals
Japan			League		Emperor's Cup		J.League Cup		Total	
1993	Toshiba	Football League	5	0	0	0	-		5	0
1994	Toshiba	Football League	8	1	1	0	-		9	1
1995	Toshiba	Football League	21	2	1	0	-		2	2
1996	Brummell Sendai	Football League	22	0	3	0	-		25	0
1997	Brummell Sendai	Football League	15	0	0	0	2	0	17	0
1998	Brummell Sendai	Football League	27	2	4	0	1	0	32	2
1999	Vegalta Sendai	J2 League	30	0	2	0	2	0	34	0
2000	Vegalta Sendai	J2 League	6	0	0	0	2	0	8	0
Total			134	5	11	0	7	0	152	5
