= 2012 Japan Football League =

Japan Football League
- Season: 2012
- Champions: V-Varen Nagasaki; 1st JFL title 1st D3 title
- Promoted: V-Varen Nagasaki
- Relegated: Sagawa Shiga (withdrawn)
- Matches played: 272
- Goals scored: 762 (2.8 per match)
- Top goalscorer: Shunta Takahashi, Masao Tsuji (20 goals)
- Highest attendance: 11,658; Ryukyu vs MYFC
- Lowest attendance: 92; Shiga vs Sony
- Average attendance: 1,240

The 2012 Japan Football League (Japanese: 第14回日本フットボールリーグ, Hepburn: Dai Jūyon-kai Nihon Futtobōru Rīgu) was the fourteenth season of the Japan Football League, the third tier of the Japanese football league system. It has started on March 11, and finished on November 18.

== Clubs ==
Locations of the 2012 Japan Football League teams

The league intended to run the season in the usual 18-team format, but after the withdrawal of Arte Takasaki in January no replacement team was invited so in 2012 JFL features only 17 teams.

Subsequently, only one club will be directly relegated and one take part in pro/rele playoffs to bring the number of JFL clubs back to 18.

During the season, on 23 July, Nagano Parceiro were approved as J. League associate members, though they are not eligible for promotion until the completion of the renovation of their home stadium which is expected in 2016.

On 28 September 2012, J. League Organization made an announcement for club licenses for 2013, and only Nagasaki was granted conditional J2 license.

On 16 October 2012, it was reported that Sagawa Shiga F.C. had notified JFL organization about their intention of withdrawal from JFL as of the end of this season. On 17 October 2012, JFL Committee has approved the request from Sagawa Shiga F.C. for its withdrawal from JFL as of the end of the season.

Club name	Home town(s)	Note(s)
Blaublitz Akita	All cities/towns in Akita	
Honda FC	Hamamatsu, Shizuoka	
Honda Lock	Miyazaki, Miyazaki	
Hoyo Oita	Ōita, Ōita	Promoted from Kyushu league in 2011
Kamatamare Sanuki	All cities/towns in Kagawa	J. League associate member, not eligible for J2 promotion
MIO Biwako Shiga	Kusatsu, Shiga	
Fujieda MYFC	Fujieda, Shizuoka	Promoted from Tōkai league D1 in 2011
Nagano Parceiro	Nagano, Nagano	J. League associate member (since July 23), not eligible for J2 promotion
SP Kyoto	Mukō, Kyoto	
FC Ryukyu	All cities/towns in Okinawa	
Sagawa Shiga	Moriyama, Shiga	
Sony Sendai	Tagajō, Miyagi	
Tochigi Uva	Tochigi, Tochigi	
V-Varen Nagasaki	All cities/towns in Nagasaki	J. League associate member, eligible for J2 promotion
Yokogawa Musashino	Musashino, Tokyo	
YSCC Yokohama	Yokohama, Kanagawa	Promoted from Kantō league D1 in 2011
Zweigen Kanazawa	Kanazawa, Ishikawa	

== Change in rules ==
=== Relegation to regional leagues ===
Because of withdrawals by Arte Takasaki and Sagawa Shiga, no clubs will be relegated automatically as of the end of the season. The bottom finished (17th placed) club will play a play-off against the 3rd placed club of the 2012 Regional League promotion series.

== Table ==
Pos	Team	Pld	W	D	L	GF	GA	GD	Pts	Promotion or relegation
1	V-Varen Nagasaki (Note: V-Varen Nagasaki topped the table at the end of the 17th round and thus were awarded JFL seed for 2012 Emperor's Cup.) (C, P)	32	20	7	5	57	24	+33	67	Promotion to 2013 J.League Division 2
2	Nagano Parceiro	32	17	7	8	57	34	+23	58	
3	Sagawa Shiga (R)	32	16	9	7	61	37	+24	57	Withdrawn (Note: On 21 October Sagawa Express Co., the owner and operator of Sagawa Shiga FC, have announced that after the season the club will withdraw from JFL and cease its operations.)
4	Kamatamare Sanuki	32	15	8	9	49	29	+20	53	
5	Honda FC	32	16	5	11	55	39	+16	53	
6	YSCC Yokohama	32	15	4	13	58	50	+8	49	
7	SP Kyoto	32	12	9	11	43	43	0	45	
8	MIO Biwako Shiga	32	11	10	11	53	52	+1	43	
9	FC Ryukyu	32	12	7	13	58	62	−4	43	
10	Yokogawa Musashino	32	11	8	13	35	50	−15	41	
11	Fujieda MYFC	32	11	7	14	39	48	−9	40	
12	Sony Sendai	32	9	12	11	27	29	−2	39	
13	Blaublitz Akita	32	9	10	13	33	41	−8	37	
14	Zweigen Kanazawa	32	8	12	12	33	41	−8	36	
15	Hoyo Oita	32	9	8	15	40	57	−17	35	
16	Honda Lock	32	7	7	18	28	56	−28	28	
17	Tochigi Uva (O)	32	4	10	18	36	70	−34	22	Qualification for pro/rel playoffs

Updated to match(es) played on 18 November 2012. Source: Japan Football League
Rules for classification: 1st points; 2nd goal differential; 3rd goals scored; 4th head-to-head results; 5th disciplinary points; 6th draw.
(C) Champions; (O) Play-off winners; (P) Promoted; (R) Relegated

== Results ==
Home \ Away	BLA	HON	LOC	HOY	KAM	MIO	MYF	PAR	PRI	RYU	SSH	SON	UVA	VVN	YMC	YSC	ZWE
Blaublitz Akita		1–0	1–0	1–1	1–2	0–0	0–0	1–2	3–3	1–0	1–2	2–2	1–1	1–2	1–1	0–1	2–1
Honda FC	1–1		1–1	0–2	3–1	0–1	2–1	4–0	2–0	4–1	2–2	2–0	3–0	1–0	1–0	6–0	0–1
Honda Lock	1–1	0–3		0–2	1–2	1–4	1–0	1–0	0–1	2–3	1–1	0–1	2–4	0–4	2–3	0–1	2–0
Hoyo Oita	0–4	6–1	1–1		0–3	0–5	0–2	3–1	1–0	4–5	0–3	1–1	1–0	0–2	2–2	1–2	0–3
Kamatamare Sanuki	3–0	1–0	6–0	1–0		0–1	1–2	0–2	1–0	4–1	0–1	0–0	0–0	0–1	1–2	2–0	1–1
MIO Biwako Shiga	0–1	3–1	1–2	1–0	1–1		1–0	3–3	1–2	2–2	2–2	0–3	2–4	1–4	1–1	2–2	3–1
Fujieda MYFC	2–0	0–2	1–1	0–0	0–0	1–7		1–0	2–5	3–0	2–4	3–0	2–2	1–2	0–1	4–1	0–0
Nagano Parceiro	1–0	5–0	2–0	1–2	0–1	3–1	4–0		2–1	1–0	2–2	1–1	3–1	1–0	5–0	0–1	2–2
SP Kyoto	1–1	0–0	0–1	6–2	2–4	1–1	2–0	1–0		2–2	1–0	0–2	4–1	1–1	1–1	1–1	1–2
FC Ryukyu	0–1	1–2	1–0	3–2	2–2 (Note: F.C. Ryukyu vs Kamatamare Sanuki, a match for the 27th round originally scheduled on 29 September, was postponed due to approaching Typhoon Jelawat, and played on 31 October.)	4–1	1–2	0–2	4–0		2–1	1–1	4–2	1–0	1–3	3–4	3–2
Sagawa Shiga	0–1	4–0	2–3	2–1	2–1	4–0	1–1	0–1	4–0	4–3		3–1	3–0	2–0	1–2	1–4	0–0
Sony Sendai	3–2	0–1	1–1	0–1	0–0	2–0	1–0	1–2	0–1	1–1	0–0		1–0	0–1	1–0	0–0	0–0
Tochigi Uva	3–1	3–3	2–1	0–0	0–3	0–3	0–1	1–4 (Note: The 10th round game on May 6 between Tochigi Uva and Nagano Parceiro was discontinued after the first half because of heavy thunderstorm. The score at the moment was 0–0. The match was replayed in full on June 20.)	1–3	1–1	2–3	2–4		1–4	0–0	1–6	1–1
V-Varen Nagasaki	1–0	2–0	1–1	4–0	4–2	1–1	3–1	2–2	0–0	4–1	2–2	1–0	2–2		1–0	2–1	2–0
Yokogawa Musashino	2–0	0–7	0–1	0–4	0–3	1–2	1–3	1–1	2–0	2–2	1–1	1–0	2–1	1–0		1–2	1–2
YSCC Yokohama	4–1	0–2	4–1	3–3	1–2	3–0	4–1	1–2	1–2	2–0	1–3	2–0	2–0	0–3	1–2		1–2
Zweigen Kanazawa	1–2	2–1	2–0	0–0	1–1	2–2	1–3	2–2	0–1	2–3	0–1	0–0	0–0	0–1	2–1	0–4	

Updated to match(es) played on 18 November 2012. Source: Japan Football League: First round, second round
Legend: Blue = home team win; Yellow = draw; Red = away team win.

== Top scorers ==
Rank	Scorer	Club	Goals
1	(Japan) Shunta Takahashi	FC Ryukyu	20
1	(Japan) Masao Tsuji	YSCC Yokohama	20
3	(Japan) Shohei Kiyohara	Sagawa Shiga	17
3	(Japan) Kota Sugawara	MIO Biwako Shiga	17
3	(Japan) Yuji Unozawa	Nagano Parceiro	17
6	(Japan) Kiichi Iga	Honda FC	15
7	(Japan) Kazuki Ganaha	FC Ryukyu	13
7	(Japan) Hideyuki Ishida	Kamatamare Sanuki	13
9	(Japan) Shintaro Hirai	SP Kyoto	12
9	(Japan) Masatoshi Matsuda	Blaublitz Akita	12
9	(Japan) Shoma Mizunaga	V-Varen Nagasaki	12

Updated to games played on 18 November 2012
Source: Japan Football League

== Attendance ==
Pos	Team	Total	High	Low	Average	Change
1	V-Varen Nagasaki	58,502	8,545	679	3,656	+141.6%
2	Nagano Parceiro	44,963	4,127	1,803	2,810	+23.2%
3	Kamatamare Sanuki	37,511	3,457	1,216	2,344	−22.5%
4	Zweigen Kanazawa	37,013	9,136	522	2,313	−7.6%
5	FC Ryukyu	34,626	11,658	262	2,164	+16.3%
6	Blaublitz Akita	18,175	2,162	618	1,136	−10.8%
7	Honda FC	13,171	3,056	376	823	−7.4%
8	Sagawa Shiga	11,875	1,852	92	742	−35.6%
9	Yokogawa Musashino	11,445	1,312	316	715	−0.1%
10	YSCC Yokohama	11,360	1,436	411	710	n/a^{†}
11	MIO Biwako Shiga	10,189	2,206	208	637	−4.9%
12	Sony Sendai	9,413	1,174	263	588	−13.5%
13	Honda Lock	8,715	1,274	296	545	−19.5%
14	Fujieda MYFC	8,507	1,317	200	532	+81.0%^{†}
15	Tochigi Uva	7,853	1,588	175	491	−7.5%
16	Hoyo Oita	7,668	1,415	252	479	+161.7%^{†}
17	SP Kyoto	6,242	736	105	390	+1.8%
	League total	337,228	11,658	92	1,240	−26.3%

Updated to games played on 18 November 2012
Source: Japan Football League: First round, second round
Notes:
^{†} Team played previous season in Regional Leagues.

== Promotions and relegations after the regular season ==
V-Varen Nagasaki were automatically promoted to J2 while Machida Zelvia became the first ever team to be relegated from J. League, returning to the JFL after only one season.

SC Sagamihara and Fukushima United were promoted to JFL as the winner and runner-up of the Regional League promotion series, respectively. Third-placed Norbritz Hokkaido faced Tochigi Uva in a playoff series. Both games were played in Tochigi to prevent snow in Hokkaido from potentially postponing an away game. After two games, the series were tied 2–2, but Tochigi Uva won the penalty shootout 4–1, retaining their spot in JFL for the 2013 season.

=== Playoffs with Regional Promotion Series ===
December 9, 2012
14:00

Norbritz Hokkaido	2–1	Tochigi Uva
Yamada 44', 58'	Report (Japanese)	Wakabayashi 4'

Tochigi General Athletic Park Stadium, Tochigi
Attendance: 902
Referee: Tomoo Inoue 井上知大

December 16, 2012
13:00

Tochigi Uva	1–0 (a.e.t.)	Norbritz Hokkaido
Hamaoka 62' (pen.)	Report (Japanese)
Penalties
Hamaoka (penalty scored); Okada (penalty scored); Takeuchi (penalty scored); Amma (penalty scored)	4–1	(penalty missed) Hatakeyama; (penalty scored) Ji Jun-Gi; (penalty missed) Kuraya

Tochigi General Athletic Park Stadium, Tochigi
Attendance: 1,445
Referee: Takuya Maeda

Tochigi Uva won the series 4–1 on penalty kicks and remained in JFL.
