= Nixon Perea =

Colombian footballer (born 1973)

Personal information
- Full name: Nixon Perea Mosquera
- Date of birth: 15 August 1973 (age 53)
- Place of birth: Medellín, Colombia
- Height: 1.81 m (5 ft 11 in)
- Position: Midfielder

Team information
- Current team: Alianza Lima (youth manager)

Senior career*
Years	Team	Apps	(Gls)
1993	Unión Magdalena		
1994–1996	Atlético Nacional		
1997	Deportivo Pereira		
1998	Independiente Santa Fe		
1999	Vegalta Sendai	24	(3)

International career
- Colombia U20

Managerial career
- 2012–2021: Atlético Nacional (youth)
- 2023–: Alianza Lima (youth)
- 2023: Alianza Lima (caretaker)
- * Club domestic league appearances and goals

Nixon Perea Mosquera (born 15 August 1973) is a Colombian football coach and former player who played as a midfielder. He is the current manager of Peruvian club Alianza Lima's youth sides.

Perea has played for, Independiente Santa Fe (Colombia), Atlético Nacional (Colombia), and Vegalta Sendai (Japan). He played for the Colombia national team at 1993 FIFA World Youth Championship in Australia.

He has held coaching roles at Atlético Nacional and Alianza Lima. He was interim manager of Alianza Lima in July and August 2023, though he could only take charge of two games as interim as he did not hold a Pro License.

== Career statistics ==
Appearances and goals by club, season and competition
Club	Season	League			Emperor's Cup		J.League Cup		Total	
Club	Season	Division	Apps	Goals	Apps	Goals	Apps	Goals	Apps	Goals
Vegalta Sendai	1999	J2 League	24	3	2	0	0	0	26	3
Career total			24	3	2	0	0	0	26	3
