= Slobodan Dubajić =

Serbian footballer

Personal information
- Full name: Slobodan Dubajić
- Date of birth: 19 February 1963 (age 63)
- Place of birth: Zrenjanin, SFR Yugoslavia
- Height: 1.91 m (6 ft 3 in)
- Position: Defender

Senior career*
Years	Team	Apps	(Gls)
1982–1991	Proleter Zrenjanin	210	(19)
1991–1995	VfB Stuttgart	116	(7)
1996	Zeytinburnuspor	4	(0)
1997–2000	Vegalta Sendai	108	(16)
Total		438	(42)

International career
1994	FR Yugoslavia	1	(0)
- * Club domestic league appearances and goals

Slobodan Dubajić (Serbian Cyrillic: Слободан Дубајић; born 19 February 1963) is a Serbian retired footballer who played as a defender.

== Club career ==
Dubajić played for his hometown club Proleter Zrenjanin between 1982 and 1991, making his Yugoslav First League debut in his last season. He subsequently moved abroad to Germany and joined VfB Stuttgart, helping them win the Bundesliga in his debut season. In total, Dubajić made 116 league appearances and scored seven goals over the course of his four years with the club. He also briefly played for Turkish side Zeytinburnuspor, before moving to Japan and spending four years at Vegalta Sendai.

== International career ==
At international level, Dubajić was called up to Yugoslavia's UEFA Euro 1992 squad. However, the country received a ban just days before the tournament due to the Yugoslav Wars and the team returned home.

Later on, Dubajić was capped once for FR Yugoslavia, playing the first half of a 2–0 friendly loss to Brazil on 23 December 1994, in what was the country's inaugural match.

== Career statistics ==
=== Club ===
Appearances and goals by club, season and competition
Club	Season	League			National Cup		League Cup		Continental		Total	
Club	Season	Division	Apps	Goals	Apps	Goals	Apps	Goals	Apps	Goals	Apps	Goals
Proleter Zrenjanin	1982–83	Yugoslav Second League	6	0			—		—		6	0
Proleter Zrenjanin	1983–84	Yugoslav Second League	25	1			—		—		25	1
Proleter Zrenjanin	1984–85	Yugoslav Second League	11	0			—		—		11	0
Proleter Zrenjanin	1985–86	Yugoslav Second League	32	7			—		—		32	7
Proleter Zrenjanin	1986–87	Yugoslav Second League	32	1			—		—		32	1
Proleter Zrenjanin	1987–88	Yugoslav Second League					—		—			
Proleter Zrenjanin	1988–89	Yugoslav Second League	35	5			—		—		35	5
Proleter Zrenjanin	1989–90	Yugoslav Second League	35	3			—		—		35	3
Proleter Zrenjanin	1990–91	Yugoslav First League	34	2			—		—		34	2
Proleter Zrenjanin	Total		210	19			—		—		210	19
VfB Stuttgart	1991–92	Bundesliga	38	2	4	0	—		4	0	46	2
VfB Stuttgart	1992–93	Bundesliga	32	4	2	1	—		3	0	37	5
VfB Stuttgart	1993–94	Bundesliga	26	1	1	0	—		—		27	1
VfB Stuttgart	1994–95	Bundesliga	20	0	3	0	—		—		23	0
VfB Stuttgart	Total		116	7	10	1	—		7	0	133	8
Zeytinburnuspor	1996–97	1.Lig	4	0			—		—		4	0
Vegalta Sendai	1997	Japan Football League	22	2			0	0	—		22	2
Vegalta Sendai	1998	Japan Football League	25	10			3	0	—		25	10
Vegalta Sendai	1999	J.League Division 2	30	1			2	0	—		30	1
Vegalta Sendai	2000	J.League Division 2	31	3			0	0	—		31	3
Vegalta Sendai	Total		108	16			5	0	—		113	16
Career total			438	42	10	1	5	0	7	0	460	43

=== International ===
Appearances and goals by national team and year
National team	Year	Apps	Goals
FR Yugoslavia	1994	1	0
Total		1	0

== Honours ==
VfB Stuttgart

- Bundesliga: 1991–92
- DFB-Supercup: 1992
