= Nobeoka Nishishina Athletic Stadium =

Stadium in Nobeoka, Miyazaki, Japan

Coordinates: 32°34′14″N 131°38′26″E

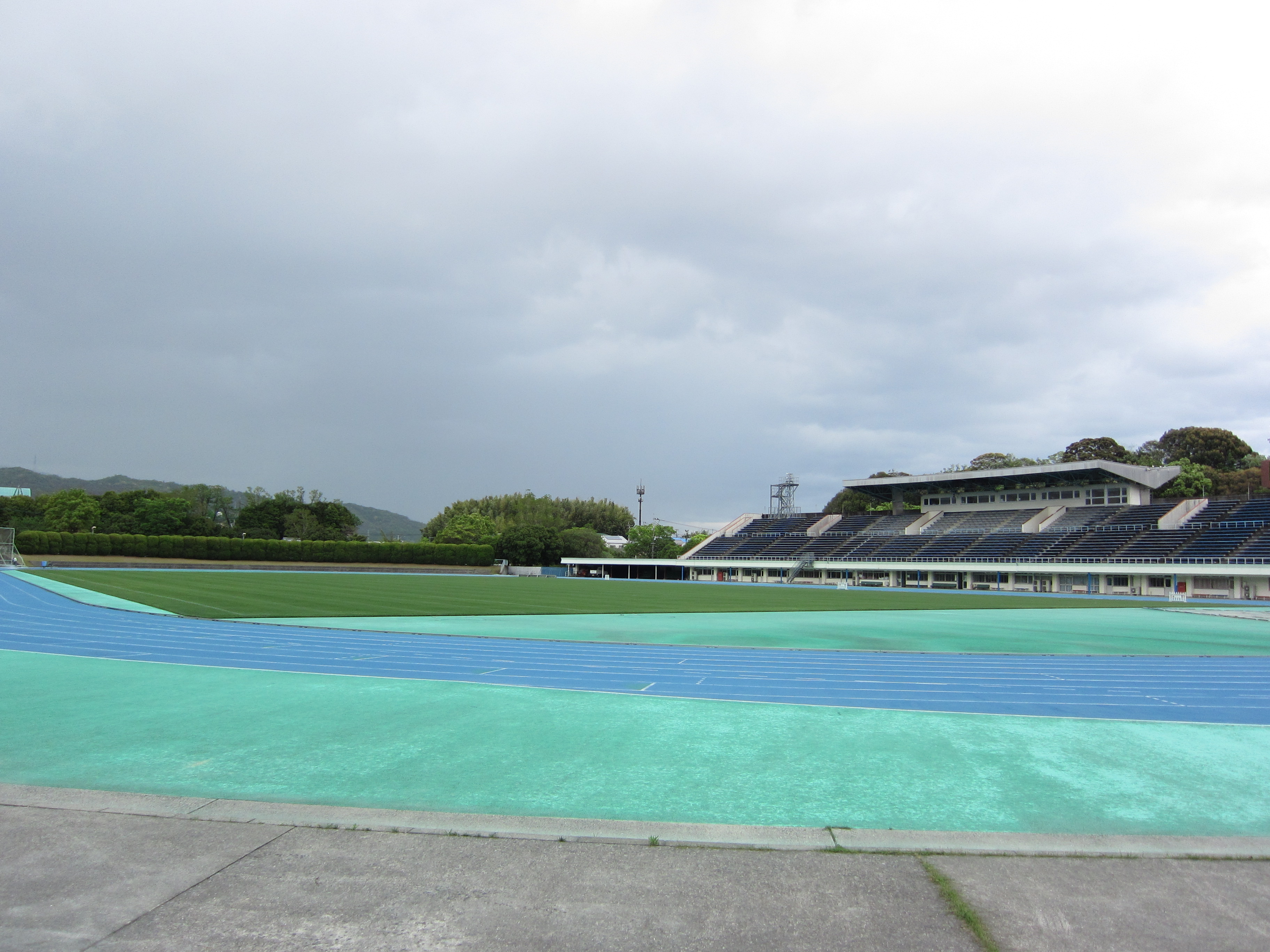
- Interactive map of Nobeoka Nishishina Athletic Stadium
- Location: Nobeoka, Miyazaki, Japan
- Capacity: 15,000

Construction
- Opened: 1968

Tenant
- Honda Lock SC

Nobeoka Nishishina Athletic Stadium is an athletic stadium in Nobeoka, Miyazaki, Japan.
