= Kazuhiro Koso =

Japanese footballer and manager

Kazuhiro Koso 高祖 和弘
Personal information
- Full name: Kazuhiro Koso
- Date of birth: March 6, 1959 (age 67)
- Place of birth: Saga, Saga, Japan
- Height: 1.79 m (5 ft 10 1/2 in)
- Position: Goalkeeper

Youth career
- 1974–1976: Saga Higashi High School
- 1977–1980: Tenri University

Senior career*
| Years | Team | Apps | (Gls) |
| 1981–1991 | Matsushita Electric | | |

Managerial career
- 2000–2001: Sagan Tosu
Medal record
Matsushita Electric
| Winner | Emperor's Cup | 1990 |
- * Club domestic league appearances and goals

Kazuhiro Koso (高祖 和弘, Koso Kazuhiro; born March 6, 1959) is a former Japanese football player and manager.

== Playing career ==
Koso was born in Saga on March 6, 1959. After graduating from Tenri University, he joined Matsushita Electric (later Gamba Osaka) in 1981. He retired in 1991.

== Coaching career ==
In 1990, when Koso was a player, he became goalkeeper coach at Matsushita Electric. He coached until 1997. In 2000, he signed as manager with his local club Sagan Tosu and became a manager. He managed until 2001.

== Managerial statistics ==
| Team | From | To | Record | | | | |
| Team | From | To | G | W | D | L | Win % |
|---|---|---|---|---|---|---|---|
| Sagan Tosu | 2000 | 2001 | 84 | 25 | 9 | 50 | 29.76 |
| Total | | | 84 | 25 | 9 | 50 | 29.76 |
