= Will (Brazilian footballer) =

Brazilian footballer (born 1973)

Personal information
- Full name: Will Robson Emilio Andrade
- Date of birth: December 15, 1973 (age 52)
- Place of birth: São Paulo, Brazil
- Height: 1.77 m (5 ft 9 1/2 in)
- Position: Forward

Senior career*
Years	Team	Apps	(Gls)
1992	Atlético Paranaense		
1994	Clube do Remo		
1996–1998	Atlético Paranaense		
1998–2000	Oita Trinita	85	(49)
2001	Consadole Sapporo	26	(24)
2002	Yokohama F. Marinos	24	(14)
2003	Consadole Sapporo	4	(4)
2003	Oita Trinita	16	(2)
2004–2005	Wuhan Huanghelou		(22)
2006	América		
2007–2008	Al-Sailiya		
- * Club domestic league appearances and goals

Will Robson Emilio Andrade (born 15 December 1973), known as just Will, is a former Brazilian footballer who played as a forward.

== Clubs ==
Will played for Atlético Paranaense in Brazil, before moving to play in Japan. He spent three seasons in the J2 League with Oita Trinita from 1998 to 2000. Next, he joined Consadole Sapporo, where he was the 2001 J. League's top scorer with 24 goals. He spent the following season on loan with Yokohama F. Marinos, who sacked him for kicking teammate, Daisuke Oku, during a match. He joined Oita Trinita for the next season, before returning to Consadole Sapporo for the 2004 season. Will also played for Wuhan Guanggu.

== Club statistics ==
Club performance			League		Cup		League Cup		Total	
Season	Club	League	Apps	Goals	Apps	Goals	Apps	Goals	Apps	Goals
Japan			League		Emperor's Cup		J.League Cup		Total	
1998	Oita Trinity	Football League	26	9	3	0	-		29	9
1999	Oita Trinita	J2 League	30	18	1	1	4	0	35	19
2000	Oita Trinita	J2 League	29	22	0	0	2	0	31	22
2001	Consadole Sapporo	J1 League	26	24	0	0	2	2	28	26
2002	Yokohama F. Marinos	J1 League	24	14	0	0	6	2	30	16
2003	Consadole Sapporo	J2 League	4	4	0	0	-		4	4
2003	Oita Trinita	J1 League	16	2	1	0	0	0	17	2
Total			155	93	5	1	14	4	174	98

== Honors ==
=== Individual honors ===
- J1 League Top Scorer : 2001
- J1 League Best Eleven: 2001
- China League One Top Scorer: 2004
