= Valdney =

Brazilian footballer

Personal information
- Full name: Valdney Freitas da Matta
- Date of birth: April 20, 1971 (age 55)
- Place of birth: Brazil
- Height: 1.82 m (5 ft 11 1/2 in)
- Position: Striker

Senior career*
Years	Team	Apps	(Gls)
1998	Kawasaki Frontale		
2000	Oita Trinita		
- * Club domestic league appearances and goals

Valdney Freitas da Matta (born April 20, 1971) is a former Brazilian football player.

== Career statistics ==
Appearances and goals by club, season and competition
Club	Season	League			Emperor's Cup		J.League Cup		Total	
Club	Season	Division	Apps	Goals	Apps	Goals	Apps	Goals	Apps	Goals
Kawasaki Frontale	1998	Football League	29	33	3	2	4	1	36	36
Oita Trinita	2000	J2 League	10	4	0	0	2	1	12	5
Career total			39	37	3	2	6	2	48	41
