= Saiki Chuo Hospital Stadium =

Sports venue in Saiki, Oita Prefecture, Japan

Saiki Stadium
- 佐伯市総合運動公園陸上競技場
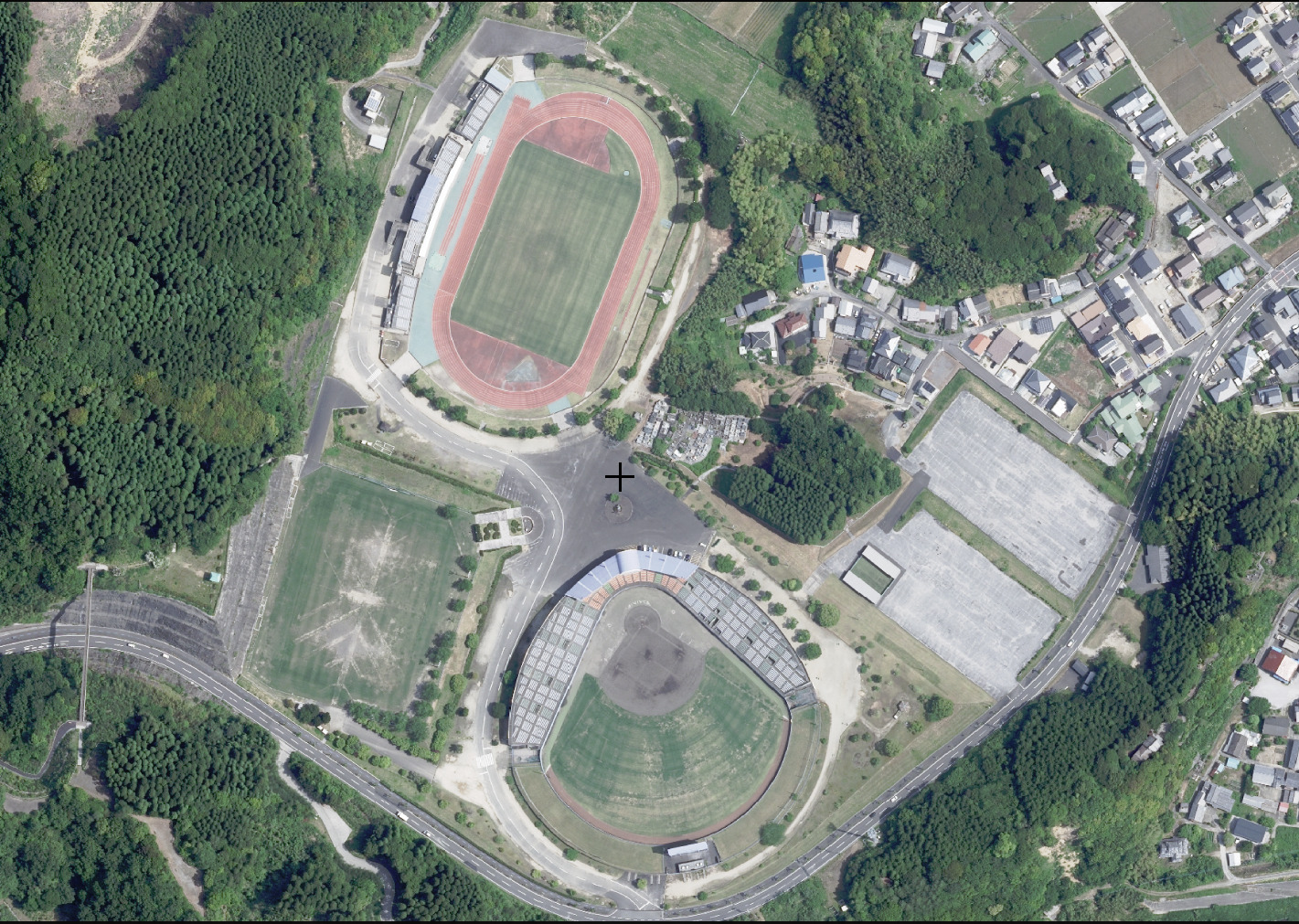

- Location within Oita Prefecture Location within Japan
- Full name: Saiki City Sports Park Track and Field Stadium
- Address: 2614 Hase, Saeki-shi, Oita-ken
- Location: Saiki, Oita, Japan
- Coordinates: 32°55′52.53″N 131°52′15.46″E
- Owner: Saiki City
- Capacity: 5,000

Tenant
- Verspah Oita

Website
- Official website

Saiki City Sports Park Track and Field Stadium (佐伯市総合運動公園陸上競技場) is an athletic stadium located in the city of Saiki, Ōita Prefecture, Japan. From June 1, 2019, due to naming rights, the nickname "Saeki Central Hospital Athletics Stadium" has been used. It is also used as a baseball stadium. The facility is owned by Saiki City and operated and managed by Saiki Environmental Center Ltd.

It was one of the home stadium of football club Oita Trinita from 1999 to 2000. Currently, Verspah Oita (JFL) hosts some home games.In 2001, the stadium was used as a training camp for the Tunisian national soccer team at the 2002 FIFA World Cup.

The stadium has a capacity for 5,000 people (seating only in the main stand, other seats on the lawn). It is 15 minutes by car from JR Kyushu Saiki Station.
