= Oita Athletic Stadium =

Athletic stadium in Oita, Japan

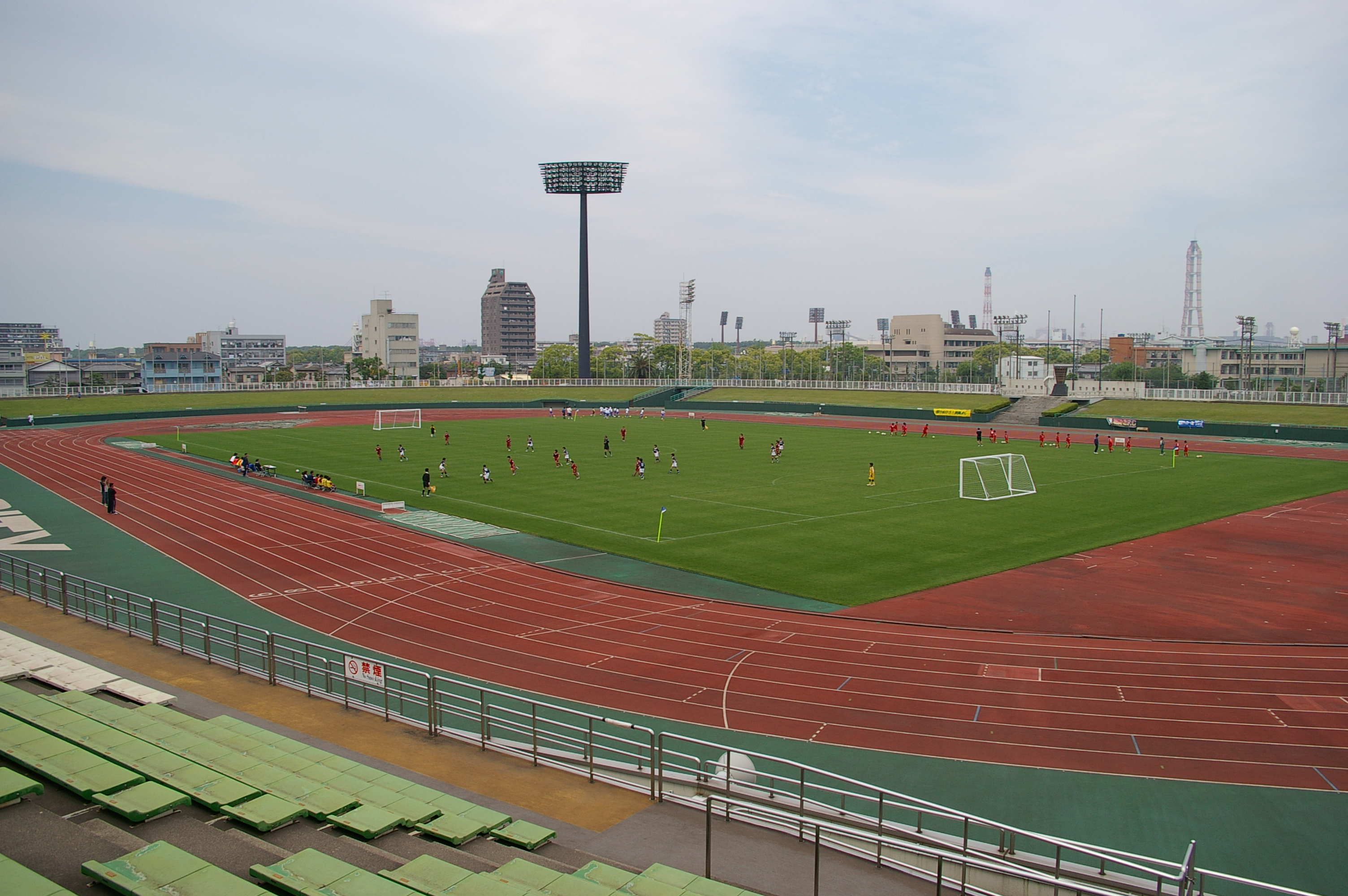
- Interactive map of Oita Athletic Stadium
- Former names: Oita Athletic Stadium
- Location: Oita, Oita, Japan
- Coordinates: 33°14′47″N 131°37′23″E
- Owner: Oita City
- Operator: Oita River Stadium Consortium
- Capacity: 16,000
- Surface: Natural grass
- Field size: 70m × 100m

Construction
- Opened: 1965
- Renovated: 1984
- Expanded: 1993

Tenants
- J-Lease FC; Verspah Oita; Japan Steel Oita Soccer Club

Oita Athletic Stadium (大分市営陸上競技場) is an athletics stadium located in Tsuru Sports Park in Ōita, Ōita Prefecture, Japan. The facility is owned by Oita City and is operated and managed by the Oita River Stadium Consortium.

On February 25, 2022, Oita City signed a naming rights agreement with Japanese real estate company J-Lease. As a result, the Oita Athletic Stadium was renamed to the
J-Lease Stadium, with the sponsorship contract beginning on April 1, 2022 until March 31, 2027.
