= Nobuhiro Ishizaki =

Japanese footballer and manager

Nobuhiro Ishizaki 石﨑 信弘
Personal information
- Full name: Nobuhiro Ishizaki
- Date of birth: 14 March 1958 (age 68)
- Place of birth: Hiroshima, Hiroshima, Japan
- Height: 1.75 m (5 ft 9 in)
- Position: Defender

Team information
- Current team: Matsumoto Yamaga FC (manager)

Youth career
- 1973–1975: Hiroshima Technical High School
- 1976–1979: Tokyo University of Agriculture

Senior career*
Years	Team	Apps	(Gls)
1980–1993	Toshiba		

Managerial career
- 1995–1998: Montedio Yamagata
- 1999–2001: Oita Trinita
- 2001–2003: Kawasaki Frontale
- 2004: Shimizu S-Pulse
- 2005: Tokyo Verdy
- 2006–2008: Kashiwa Reysol
- 2009–2012: Consadole Sapporo
- 2014–2016: Montedio Yamagata
- 2017–2018: Tegevajaro Miyazaki
- 2018–2020: Fujieda MYFC
- 2021–2022: Kataller Toyama
- 2023–2025: Vanraure Hachinohe
- 2026–: Matsumoto Yamaga FC
Medal record
Toshiba
Winner	JSL Cup	1981
Runner-up	JSL Cup	1984
Runner-up	JSL Cup	1988
- * Club domestic league appearances and goals

Nobuhiro Ishizaki (石﨑 信弘, Ishizaki Nobuhiro; born March 14, 1958) is a former Japanese football player and manager of Matsumoto Yamaga FC.

== Club career ==
Ishizaki was born in Hiroshima on March 14, 1958. After graduating from Tokyo University of Agriculture, he joined Toshiba in 1980. He played until 1993.

== Managerial career ==
After retirement, Ishizaki decided to pursue coaching, starting at NEC Yamagata (later Montedio Yamagata) in 1995. After that, he managed several J.League clubs, first managing Oita Trinita from 1999 to 2001, Kawasaki Frontale from 2001 to 2003, Shimizu S-Pulse in 2004, Tokyo Verdy (2005), Kashiwa Reysol from 2006 to 2008, Consadole Sapporo from 2009 to 2012 and Montedio Yamagata from 2014 to 2016. In 2017, he signed with Regional Leagues club Tegevajaro Miyazaki. He resigned in June 2018. In July 2018, he signed with J3 League club Fujieda MYFC.

In 2021, Ishizaki joined as manager of J3 club, Kataller Toyama but, he left the club in 2022 by way of resignation. In 27 November 2022, Ishizaki joined as manager of J3 club Vanraure Hachinohe to replace Ryo Shigaki

== Career statistics ==
=== Club ===
As of the end of 1993 season.

Club	Season	Division	JSL		Emperor's Cup		JSL Cup		Total	
Club	Season	Division	Apps	Goals	Apps	Goals	Apps	Goals	Apps	Goals
Toshiba	1988-89	Division 1	22	1					22	1
Toshiba	1990-91	Division 1	9	0			2	0	11	0
Toshiba	1991-92	Division 1	5	0			0	0	5	0
Career total			36	1	0	0	2	0	38	1

== Managerial statistics ==
As of the start from 2023 season.

Team	From	To	Record				
Team	From	To	G	W	D	L	Win %
Oita Trinita	1999	2001	87	53	6	28	60.92
Kawasaki Frontale	2001	2003	112	59	25	28	52.68
Shimizu S-Pulse	2004	2004	15	4	1	10	26.67
Tokyo Verdy	2005	2005	1	0	0	1	0.00
Kashiwa Reysol	2006	2008	116	54	22	40	46.55
Consadole Sapporo	2009	2012	159	57	36	66	35.85
Montedio Yamagata	2014	2016	118	33	36	49	27.97
Fujieda MYFC	2018	2020	100	42	20	38	42.00
Kataller Toyama	2021	2022	62	32	10	20	51.61
Vanraure Hachinohe	2023	present	0	0	0	0	—
Total			770	334	156	280	43.38
