= 1998 Japan Football League =

Japan Football League
- Season: 1998
- Champions: Tokyo Gas; 1st JFL title 1st D2 title
- Matches: 240
- Goals: 846 (3.53 per match)
- Top goalscorer: Valdney (33 goals)

Statistics of Japan Football League in the 1998 season.

== Overview ==
1998 JFL teams

The 1998 season was the seventh and the last of the former Japan Football League. It was contested by 16 teams, and Tokyo Gas won the championship. After the season, nine teams together with J. League Promotion and Relegation series' losers Consadole Sapporo formed the second division of J.League. Other seven clubs together with Regional Leagues promotion series winners Yokogawa Electric and newly created Yokohama FC have formed the new Japan Football League.

== Clubs ==
The following sixteen clubs participated in Japan Football League Division 1 during the 1998 season.

- Albirex Niigata
- Brummell Sendai
- Denso
- Honda Motors
- Jatco
- Kawasaki Frontale
- Kokushikan University
- Mito HollyHock
- Montedio Yamagata
- Oita Trinity
- Omiya Ardija
- Otsuka FC Vortis Tokushima
- Sagan Tosu
- Sony Sendai
- Tokyo Gas
- Ventforet Kofu

=== Personnel ===
Club	Head coach
Albirex Niigata	(Japan) Yoshikazu Nagai
Brummell Sendai	(Japan) Takekazu Suzuki
Denso	
Honda Motors	(Japan) Mitsunaga Shitara
Jatco	
Kawasaki Frontale	(Brazil) Beto Almeida
Kokushikan University	(Japan) Hideo Osawa
Mito HollyHock	(Japan) Toshiya Miura
Montedio Yamagata	(Japan) Nobuhiro Ishizaki
Oita Trinity	
Omiya Ardija	(Japan) Norio Sasaki
Otsuka FC Vortis Tokushima	(Brazil) Edinho
Sagan Tosu	(Japan) Hiroshi Sowa
Sony Sendai	
Tokyo Gas	(Japan) Kiyoshi Okuma
Ventforet Kofu	(Japan) Yuji Tsukada

=== Foreign players ===
Club	Player 1	Player 2	Player 3	Non-visa foreign	Former players
Albirex Niigata					(Zimbabwe) Neathan Gibson
Brummell Sendai	(Federal Republic of Yugoslavia) Slobodan Dubajić				
Denso					
Honda Motors	(Brazil) Marcus Vinícius				
Jatco					
Kawasaki Frontale	(Brazil) José Barreto	(Brazil) Tuto	(Brazil) Valdney		(Brazil) Altemir Pessali (Brazil) Betinho (Nigeria) Momodu Mutairu
Kokushikan University					
Mito HollyHock					
Montedio Yamagata	(Brazil) Marquinho	(Brazil) Sidiclei			
Oita Trinity	(Brazil) Will	(South Korea) Choi Dae-shik			
Omiya Ardija	(Netherlands) Jan Veenhof	(Netherlands) Jeroen Boere			
Otsuka FC Vortis Tokushima	(Brazil) Almir				
Sagan Tosu				(South Korea) Pak Yong-ho	
Sony Sendai					
Tokyo Gas	(Brazil) Amaral	(Brazil) Angelo		(Brazil) Sandro	
Ventforet Kofu	(Brazil) Baron				

== Table ==
Pos	Team	Pld	W	OTW	PKW	L	GF	GA	GD	Pts	Promotion
1	Tokyo Gas (C)	30	21	3	0	6	67	17	+50	69	Formed J.League Division 2
2	Kawasaki Frontale	30	22	1	0	7	72	24	+48	68	J.League Division 1 Pro/Rele Series
3	Montedio Yamagata	30	20	2	0	8	69	38	+31	64	Formed J.League Division 2
4	Ventforet Kofu	30	16	5	1	8	74	40	+34	59	Formed J.League Division 2
5	Honda Motors	30	16	3	0	11	57	45	+12	54	Formed new Japan Football League
6	Oita Trinity	30	14	1	1	14	51	51	0	45	Formed J.League Division 2
7	Brummell Sendai	30	10	5	3	12	55	53	+2	43	Formed J.League Division 2
8	Sagan Tosu	30	11	3	0	16	40	55	−15	39	Formed J.League Division 2
9	Otsuka FC Vortis Tokushima	30	11	2	1	16	58	48	+10	38	Formed new Japan Football League
10	Denso	30	11	2	1	16	48	59	−11	38	Formed new Japan Football League
11	Albirex Niigata	30	10	2	0	18	39	47	−8	34	Formed J.League Division 2
12	Omiya Ardija	30	9	2	0	19	51	56	−5	31	Formed J.League Division 2
13	Sony Sendai	30	7	1	0	22	42	71	−29	23	Formed new Japan Football League
14	Mito HollyHock	30	7	1	0	22	37	69	−32	23	Formed new Japan Football League
15	Kokushikan University	30	5	3	0	22	42	76	−34	21	Formed new Japan Football League
16	Jatco	30	4	3	0	23	44	97	−53	18	Formed new Japan Football League

Updated to match(es) played on November 1998. Source: Montedio Yamagata website
Rules for classification: 1) points; 2) goal difference; 3) number of goals scored.
(C) Champion

== Results ==
Home \ Away	ALB	ARD	BRU	DEN	FRO	HOL	HON	JAT	KSU	MON	OVT	SAG	SON	TGA	TRI	VEN
Albirex Niigata		1–2	2–3	0–2	0–2	2–1^{OT}	5–1	2–1	2–0	2–0	2–1	1–2	2–1^{OT}	1–2^{OT}	0–1^{OT}	3–1
Omiya Ardija	2–0		1–2	3–4^{OT}	0–2	3–0	1–2^{OT}	3–0	1–0^{OT}	0–2	4–1	0–2	2–1^{OT}	0–3	3–0	1–4
Brummell Sendai	0–2	2–2^{PK 5–4}		2–1^{OT}	2–3	3–0	0–1	6–1	2–1	2–1^{OT}	3–2^{OT}	5–1	2–1^{OT}	0–3	1–0^{OT}	0–1
Denso	3–0	3–2^{OT}	2–4		1–3	3–4	0–1	2–1	2–1	3–2	1–3	0–1	3–0	1–5	2–3	1–2
Kawasaki Frontale	2–0	3–2	2–0	6–0		3–0	0–1^{OT}	3–1	1–0	2–0	1–0	7–0	1–2	0–2	1–2	1–0^{OT}
Mito HollyHock	2–1	3–1	2–1	1–2	1–5		0–3	0–1	3–2	0–3	0–7	0–1	2–1^{OT}	0–1	1–3	1–6
Honda Motors	3–1	2–1	1–3	2–1	1–0^{OT}	2–0		2–1	5–1	1–3	2–1	1–0	3–4^{OT}	0–2	2–1	1–2^{OT}
Jatco	1–2	3–2^{OT}	1–3	3–1	3–2	1–5	3–10		1–2^{OT}	3–6	2–1	3–2^{OT}	0–5	0–1	1–2	2–7
Kokushikan University	2–1	0–2	2–2^{PK 1–4}	0–2	0–4	1–4	1–3	3–2		1–4	4–3	4–1	3–2^{OT}	1–6	2–3	1–3
Montedio Yamagata	1–0	3–1	1–1^{PK 4–5}	4–2	1–0	3–2	3–2	5–0	3–2		1–0	2–1^{OT}	6–1	1–3	3–1	3–2
Otsuka FC Vortis Tokushima	1–2	0–3	1–0	1–1^{PK 4–5}	1–3	1–0	4–0	3–1	5–3	0–1		3–1	3–0	1–2^{OT}	2–2^{PK 4–2}	1–2
Sagan Tosu	1–0	2–1^{OT}	5–0	1–2	2–5	2–1	1–2	2–1	1–2^{OT}	1–0^{OT}	2–3^{OT}		2–1^{OT}	0–3	1–0	1–0
Sony Sendai	1–2	3–4	1–3	0–1	0–5	1–0	2–1	3–4^{OT}	1–2	0–2	1–3	2–3		0–1	2–1	3–1
Tokyo Gas	2–1	2–1	3–0	0–1	0–1	1–0^{OT}	2–0	5–0	3–0	0–1	0–1^{OT}	2–0	3–0		5–0	2–1
Oita Trinity	2–1	3–1	3–1	3–1	0–1	2–2^{PK 5–3}	1–2	5–1	2–1	2–3^{OT}	0–4	2–0	1–3	3–2		0–1^{OT}
Ventforet Kofu	4–1	3–2^{OT}	6–2	1–0	2–3	3–2^{OT}	1–0	2–2^{PK 4–3}	2–0	3–1	4–1	2–1^{OT}	5–0	2–1	1–3	

Updated to match(es) played on November 1998. Source: Montedio Yamagata website
Legend: Blue = home team win; Yellow = draw; Red = away team win.

== Promotion and relegation ==
Kawasaki Frontale were awarded a spot in the first round of J.League Promotion and Relegation Series where they have played against Avispa Fukuoka.

November 19, 1998
19:00

Avispa Fukuoka	3 – 2 (a.e.t.)	Kawasaki Frontale
Kudo 24'; Yamashita 89'; Fernando 104'	Report	Ito 17'; Tuto 61'

Hakatanomori Stadium, Hakata-ku, Fukuoka
Attendance: 12,535

Avispa proceeded to the next round and Frontale entered the second division.

== Successor seasons ==
- 1999 J.League Division 2
- 1999 Japan Football League
