= Ōu Honsen =

Ōu Honsen 奥羽本戦
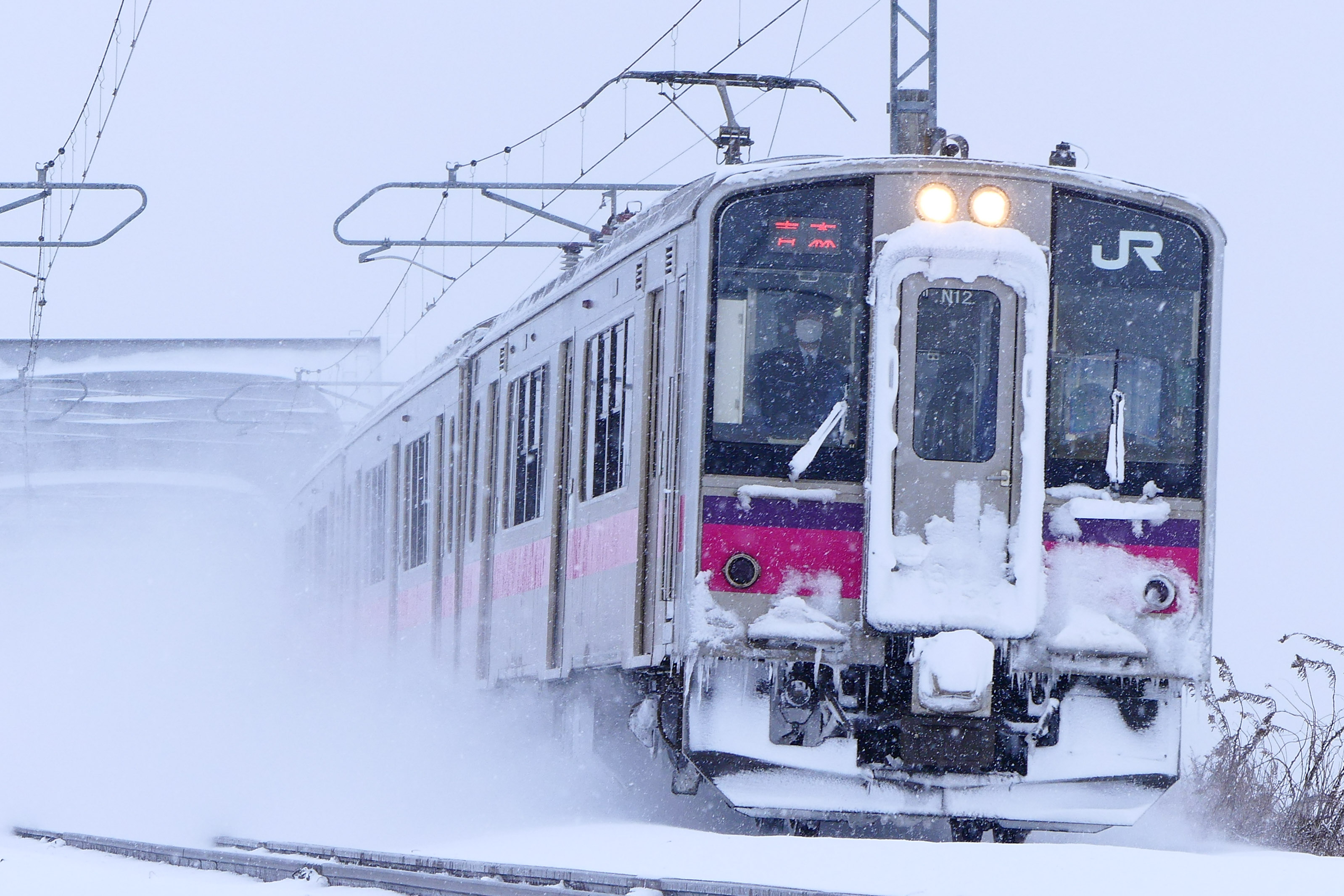
- Ōu Honsen logo and Ōu Honsen trains

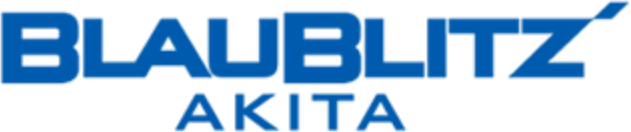
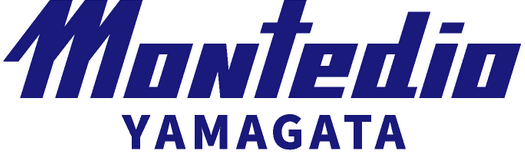
- Blaublitz Akita Montedio Yamagata
- Other names: Dewa derby Ushū derby Chōkaisan derby Japan Sea derby
- Location: (Japan) Akita Prefecture (Japan) Yamagata Prefecture
- Teams: Blaublitz Akita; Montedio Yamagata
- First meeting: Yamagata Nippon Electric 0–0 TDK (1990)
- Latest meeting: Akita 2 - 0 Yamagata; 100 Years (29 April 2026)
- Next meeting: 20 Nov 2026
- Broadcasters: Akita Television; NHK Yamagata; YBC Radio; Yamagata Television
- Stadiums: ND Soft Stadium Yamagata; Komagihara Athletic Field; Soyu Stadium

Statistics
- Total meetings: 23
- Most wins: Montedio Yamagata (15)
- All-time series: Yamagata: 15; Drawn: 4 Akita: 3
- Largest victory: Yamagata 9–1 Akita; 1991 Tohoku Soccer League
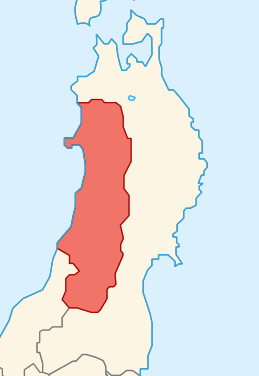
- Location of the two teams' stadia in Dewa Province

Home kit
| Akita Home colours | Yamagata Home colours |

The Ōu Honsen (奥羽本戦, Main battle of Ōu, a pun on the Ou Line railroad traversing the prefectures) is a footballing rivalry played between Blaublitz Akita and Montedio Yamagata, both professional J.League teams from the cities in the former Dewa Province, Japan. It is also known as the Dewa derby or Chokaisan derby, and named after Japan Railways Ōu Main Line which connects Akita City and Tendo, Yamagata. Series winners can wear home kits at the opponent's stadium next season. This matchup is a part of Tohoku derby.

== Stadiums ==
The game is usually hosted at Soyu Stadium and ND Soft Stadium Yamagata. The two stadiums are approximately 156 km (97 miles) apart.

| Team Name | Stadium | Capacity | Image |
|---|---|---|---|
| Blaublitz Akita | Soyu Stadium | 20,125 | |
| Blaublitz Akita | TDK Akita General Sports Centre | | |
| Blaublitz Akita | Mizubayashi Athletic Field | 10,000 | |
| Montedio Yamagata | ND Soft Stadium Yamagata | 20,315 | |
| Montedio Yamagata | Tsuruoka Komagihara Stadium | 7,000 | |

== Past results ==
Statistics as of 19 Oct 2026

| Tournament | GP | Akita wins | Draws | Yamagata wins | Goal diff |
|---|---|---|---|---|---|
| Tohoku League | 8 | 0 | 2 | 6 | 3–31 |
| J2 League | 13 | 3 | 2 | 7 | 13–22 |
| Emperor's Cup | 2 | 0 | 0 | 2 | 0–5 |
| Total | 23 | 3 | 4 | 15 | 9–48 |

=== Tohoku Soccer League ===
TDK were relegated into the regional league ahead of the 1987 season. The derby was first contested in 1990 when Tsuruoka club was promoted to Tohoku Soccer League. Yamagata won the Ōu League four times in a row between 1990 and 1993 before being accepted into the Japan Football League ahead of the 1994 season. The two teams did not play each other in the league again until the 2021 J2 League season after Akita's promotion as J3 champions.

| Season | Date | (Stage/)Week | | Location | Home | Score | Away | Attendance |
|---|---|---|---|---|---|---|---|---|
| 1990 | - | T | - | Yamagata Prefecture | Yamagata Nippon Electric | 0–0 | TDK | - |
| 1990 | - | T | - | Akita Prefecture | TDK | 1–1 | Yamagata Nippon Electric | - |
| 1991 | - | T | - | Yamagata Prefecture | Yamagata Nippon Electric | 9–1 | TDK | - |
| 1991 | - | T | - | Akita Prefecture | TDK | 1–3 | Yamagata Nippon Electric | - |
| 1992 | - | T | - | Yamagata Prefecture | NEC Yamagata | 2–0 | TDK | - |
| 1992 | - | T | - | Akita Prefecture | TDK | 0–4 | NEC Yamagata | - |
| 1993 | - | T | - | Yamagata Prefecture | NEC Yamagata | 7–0 | TDK | - |
| 1993 | - | T | - | Akita Prefecture | TDK | 0–5 | NEC Yamagata | - |

=== Emperor's Cup ===
The derby was also played twice in the Emperor's Cup.

| Season | Date | (Stage/)Week | | Venue | Home | Score | Away | Attendance |
|---|---|---|---|---|---|---|---|---|
| 2010 | September 5 | E | - | ND Soft Stadium Yamagata | Montedio Yamagata | 3–0 | Blaublitz Akita | 3,085 |
| 2011 | October 8 | E | - | ND Soft Stadium Yamagata | Montedio Yamagata | 2–0 | Blaublitz Akita | 2,425 |

=== J2 League ===
The clubs met again in the J2 League, after Akita got promoted by winning the J3 League. Their first league meeting in 28 years resulted in a scoreless draw at Soyu Stadium.

| Season | Date | (Stage/)Week | | Venue | Home | Score | Away | Attendance |
|---|---|---|---|---|---|---|---|---|
| 2021 | April 17 | J2 | 8 | Soyu Stadium | Blaublitz Akita | 0–0 | Montedio Yamagata | 1,777 |
| 2021 | Oct 10 | J2 | 33 | ND Soft Stadium Yamagata | Montedio Yamagata | 2-1 | Blaublitz Akita | 6,779 |
| 2022 | April 10 | J2 | 9 | ND Soft Stadium Yamagata | Montedio Yamagata | 5-1 | Blaublitz Akita | 5,722 |
| 2022 | July 17 | J2 | 27 | Soyu Stadium | Blaublitz Akita | 0-2 | Montedio Yamagata | 5,206 |
| 2023 | May 21 | J2 | 17 | ND Soft Stadium Yamagata | Montedio Yamagata | 2-1 | Blaublitz Akita | 8,476 |
| 2023 | Sep 23 | J2 | 36 | Soyu Stadium | Blaublitz Akita | 1–1 | Montedio Yamagata | 5,193 |
| 2024 | May 18 | J2 | 16 | ND Soft Stadium Yamagata | Montedio Yamagata | 0-2 | Blaublitz Akita | 8,229 |
| 2024 | June 03 | J2 | 22 | Soyu Stadium | Blaublitz Akita | 0-3 | Montedio Yamagata | 6,598 |
| 2025 | March 8 | J2 | 4 | ND Soft Stadium Yamagata | Montedio Yamagata | 4-2 | Blaublitz Akita | 15,687 |
| 2025 | June 21 | J2 | 20 | Soyu Stadium | Blaublitz Akita | 2-3 | Montedio Yamagata | 7,577 |
| 2026 | March 7 | 100 Year | 5 | ND Soft Stadium Yamagata | Montedio Yamagata | 0-1 | Blaublitz Akita | 12,681 |
| 2026 | April 28 | 100 Year | 13 | Soyu Stadium | Blaublitz Akita | 2-0 | Montedio Yamagata | 6,824 |
| 2026-27 | Nov 20 | J2 | 18 | Soyu Stadium | Blaublitz Akita | vs | Montedio Yamagata | |
| 2026-27 | May 9 | J2 | 36 | ND Soft Stadium Yamagata | Montedio Yamagata | vs | Blaublitz Akita | |

=== Friendlies ===
They have competed more than 27 practice games together.

| 2002-08-13 | Montedio Yamagata | v | TDK |
| | | 報告 |

| 2002-10-29 | Montedio Yamagata | 4–1 | TDK | #3 Sports Square |
| | | 報告 |

| 2003-03-05 | Montedio Yamagata | 5–0 | TDK | J-Village Stadium |
| | Akiba; Matsuda; Oshima; Hajix2 | 報告 |

| 2003-03-25 | Montedio Yamagata | 2–1 | TDK | Benibana Sports Park |
| | Nakamurax2 | 報告 | Sasaki Y. |

| 2003-05-02 | Montedio Yamagata | 1–1 | TDK | Benibana Sports Park |
| | Ito | 報告 | Honda |

| 2003-05-28 | Montedio Yamagata | 2–0 | TDK | Benibana Sports Park |
| | Hoshix2 | 報告 |

| 2003-06-10 | Montedio Yamagata | v | TDK |
| | | 報告 |

| 2003-10-01 | Montedio Yamagata | 3–2 | TDK | Benibana Sports Park |
| | Nakamurax2; Nemoto | 報告 |

| 2003-10-21 | Montedio Yamagata | 3–1 | TDK | Benibana Sports Park |
| | Nemotox2; Ito | 報告 |

| 2003-11-04 | Montedio Yamagata | 2–0 | TDK | Akanegaoka Athletic Field |
| | Akiba; Nemoto | 報告 |

| 2004-04-21 | Montedio Yamagata | 3–0 | TDK | Tendo, Yamagata |
| | Nakamura; Nemoto; Horiuchi | 報告 |

| 2004-09-12 | Montedio Yamagata | 2–1 | TDK | Tendo, Yamagata |
| | | 報告 | Kasuga |

| 2004-11-14 | Montedio Yamagata | 3–0 | TDK |
| | | 報告 報告 |

| 2005-04-24 | Montedio Yamagata | 2–0 | TDK | Yamagata Prefecture |
| | | 報告 |

| 2005-06-15 | Montedio Yamagata | v | TDK |
| | | 報告 |

| 2005-11-10 | Montedio Yamagata | v | TDK |
| | | 報告 |

| 2006-11-17 | Montedio Yamagata | 1–1 | TDK | Tendo, Yamagata |
| | | 報告 | Yokoyama |

| 2007-02-21 | Montedio Yamagata | 3–1 | TDK | J-Village Stadium |
| | | 報告 | Matsuda |

| 2008-02-28 | Montedio Yamagata | 2–2 | TDK | J-Village Stadium |
| | | 報告 | Kinoshita; Kazu Sato |

| 2009-11-01 | Montedio Yamagata | 3–1 | TDK | #3 Sports Square |
| 13:00 | | 報告 | Matsuda 44' |

| 2011-04-17 | Montedio Yamagata | 2–3 | Blaublitz Akita | #3 Sports Square |
| | Nishikawa; Hasegawa | 報告 報告; Report | | Attendance: 2,500 |

| 2011-04-17 | Montedio Yamagata | 0–2 | Blaublitz Akita | #3 Sports Square |
| | | 報告 報告 | | Attendance: 1,200 |

| 11 May 2015 | Montedio Yamagata | 1–0 | Blaublitz Akita | #3 Sports Square |
| 11:00 | | Report |

| 13 September 2015 | Montedio Yamagata | 4–0 | Blaublitz Akita | #3 Sports Square |
| 11:00 | Hidaka 24'; Hayashi 47', 69'; Toma 80' | Report |

| 27 April 2016 | Montedio Yamagata | 0–1 | Blaublitz Akita | #3 Sports Square |
| 13:00 | | Report | Maeyama |

| 12 August 2018 | Montedio Yamagata | 0–4 | Blaublitz Akita | #3 Sports Square |
| | | Report | Fujita; Chida; Toyama; I.Yamada |

| 27 May 2019 | Montedio Yamagata | 2–3 | Blaublitz Akita | #3 Sports Square |
| | | Report; Report | Fujinuma; Hori x2 |

== Players who have played for both clubs ==
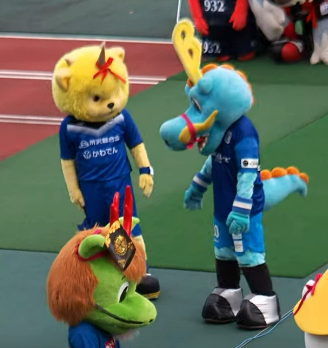
Dio and Blaugon

- (Japan) Yoshimasa Fujita (Y: 2002–2003, A: 2004)
- (Japan) Keita Hidaka (Y: 2012–2015, A: 2016–2018)
- (Japan) Kohei Higa (A: 2011, Y: 2012–2016)
- (South Korea) Han Ho-gang (Y: 2016, A: 2016–2020)
- (Japan) Yuki Inoue (Y: 2002–2004, A: 2009–2010)
- (Japan) Kenichi Kaga (Y: 2017–2019, A: 2020–)
- (Japan) Hideki Matsuda (Y: 2000–2002, A: 2004–2005, 2008)
- (Japan) Masatoshi Matsuda (Y: 2003–2004, A: 2007, 2009–2013)
- (Japan) Yuki Takabayashi (Y: 2006, A: 2007–2008)
- (Japan) Tetsu Takahashi (Y: 1998–1999, A: 2000–2002)
- (Japan) Keita Yoshioka (Y: 2022–2024, 2025 A: 2024)
