= Thaisa Moreno =

Brazilian footballer (born 1988)

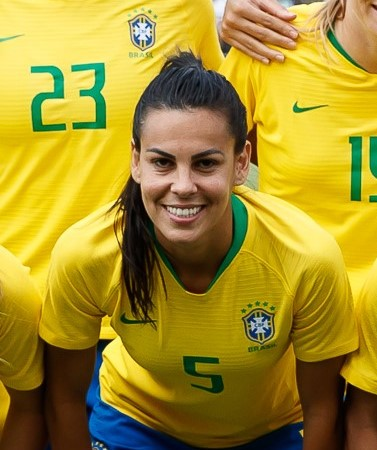
- Thaisa in July 2018

Personal information
- Full name: Thaisa de Moraes Rosa Moreno
- Date of birth: 17 December 1988 (age 37)
- Place of birth: Xambrê, Paraná, Brazil
- Height: 1.66 m (5 ft 5 in)
- Position: Midfielder

Team information
- Current team: Flamengo
- Number: 17

College career
Years	Team	Apps	(Gls)
2007–2008	Feather River Golden Eagles		(69)
2009–2010	FIU Panthers	20	(7)

Senior career*
Years	Team	Apps	(Gls)
2011	Foz Cataratas		
2012–2013	Ferroviária		
2013	Centro Olímpico	7	(0)
2014	Tyresö FF	5	(0)
2014	Ferroviária	10	(0)
2015	América Mineiro	6	(0)
2016	São José EC	8	(0)
2017	Grindavík	7	(1)
2018	Sky Blue FC	8	(0)
2018–2019	Milan	19	(3)
2019–2020	CD Tacón	15	(1)
2020–2021	Real Madrid	23	(1)
2021–2022	Roma	10	(0)
2022–	Flamengo	34	(3)

International career^{‡}
2013–	Brazil	86	(5)
Medal record
Women's football
Representing Brazil
Pan American Games
Gold medal – first place	2015 Toronto	Team
- * Club domestic league appearances and goals as of 22:55, 28 April 2024 (UTC) ‡ National team caps and goals as of 7 March 2020

Thaisa de Moraes Rosa Moreno (born 17 December 1988), known as Thaisa Moreno or just Thaisa, is a Brazilian footballer who plays as a midfielder for Flamengo and the Brazil women's national team. She previously played for Real Madrid, while her earlier career saw Thaisa play a short spell with Swedish Damallsvenskan club Tyresö FF in 2014 and with Sky Blue FC of the National Women's Soccer League in 2018.

== Club career ==
=== Centro Olímpico ===
Thaisa made her league debut against São Francisco on 13 November 2013.

=== Tyresö ===
Thaisa transferred from Centro Olímpico to Tyresö FF in January 2014, as one of four Brazilians to join the Swedish club.

Thaisa was a late substitute in Tyresö's 4–3 2014 UEFA Women's Champions League Final defeat by Wolfsburg. Shortly afterwards Tyresö were declared insolvent and kicked out of the 2014 Damallsvenskan season, expunging all their results and making all their players free agents.

=== Ferroviária ===
Thaisa made her league debut against Avaí on 1 October 2014.

=== América Mineiro ===
Thaisa made her league debut against Tiradentes on 30 September 2015.

=== São José ===
Thaisa made her league debut against Flamengo on 23 March 2016.

=== Grindavík ===
Thaisa made her league debut against Fylkir on 27 April 2017. She scored her first league goal against Haukar on 3 May 2017, scoring in the 71st minute.

=== Sky Blue ===
On 13 December 2017, she signed with Sky Blue FC in the NWSL. Thaisa made her league debut against Seattle Reign on 13 May 2018. After making eight appearances with the club, she was released on 25 July 2018, so she could pursue overseas opportunities.

=== AC Milan ===
Thaisa switched to newly formed A.C. Milan Women in the Seria A for the 2018–19 season. She made her league debut against Fiorentina on 30 September 2018. Thaisa scored her first league goal against Tavagnacco on 20 October 2018, scoring in the 87th minute.

=== Tacón ===
On 26 July 2019, Thaisa joined CD Tacón in the Spanish Primera División. She made her league debut against Sporting de Huelva on 14 September 2019. Thaisa scored her first league goal against Sporting de Huelva on 19 January 2020, scoring in the 48th minute.

=== Real Madrid ===
Thaisa made her league debut against Deportivo de La Coruña on 4 November 2020. She scored her first league goal against Sevilla on 5 December 2020, scoring in the 82nd minute.

=== Roma ===
After two years of playing in Madrid, Thaisa returned to Italian football and signed for Roma on the summer of 2021. She made her league debut against Empoli on 28 August 2021.

=== Flamengo ===
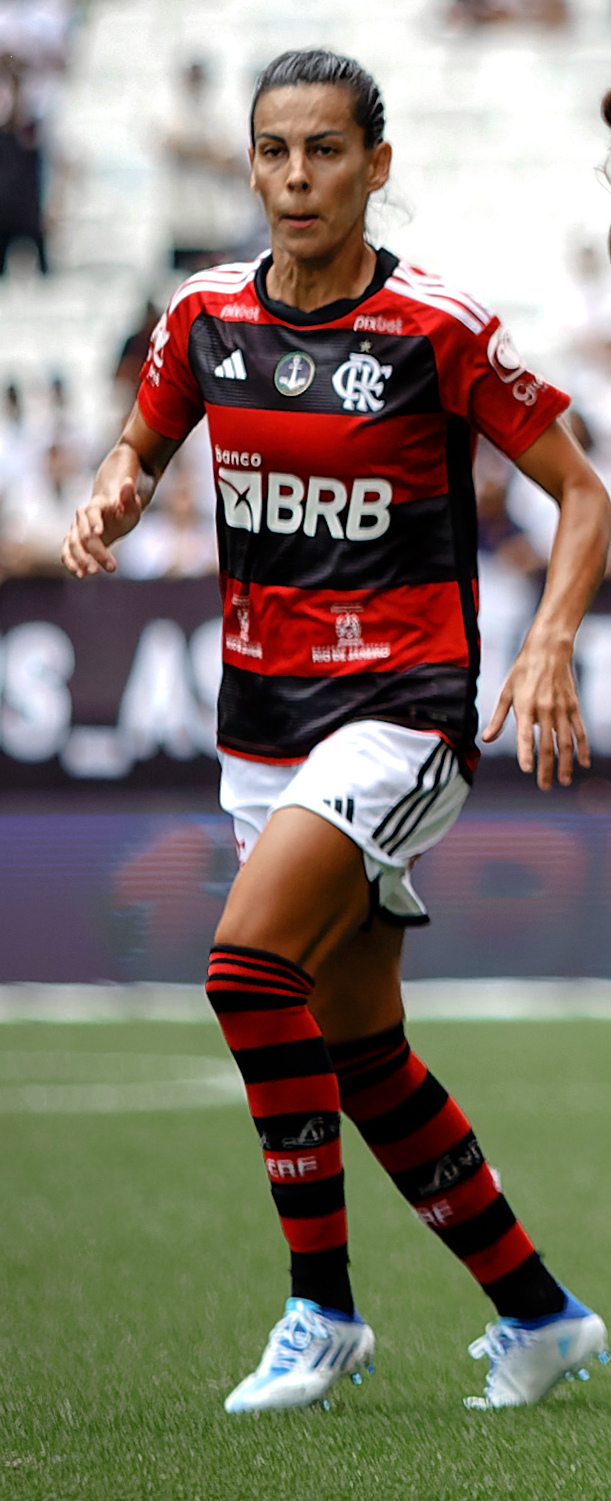
Thaisa with Flamengo in 2023

Thaisa made her league debut against São Paulo on 7 March 2022. She scored her first league goal against Ceará on 26 March 2023, scoring in the 63rd minute.

== International career ==
Thaisa made her senior debut for Brazil in September 2013, in a 1–0 defeat by New Zealand in Châtel-Saint-Denis, Switzerland. She scored her first national team goal in Brazil's 2–0 win over Chile at the 2013 Torneio Internacional de Brasília de Futebol Feminino.

== Career statistics ==
=== International goals ===
No.	Date	Venue	Opponent	Score	Result	Competition
1.	12 December 2013	Estádio Nacional Mané Garrincha, Brasília, Brazil	Chile	2–0	2–0	2013 International Women's Football Tournament of Brasília
2.	12 September 2014	Estadio Federativo Reina del Cisne, Loja, Ecuador	Bolivia	5–0	6–0	2014 Copa América Femenina
3.	11 July 2015	Tim Hortons Field, Hamilton, Canada	Costa Rica	2–0	3–0	2015 Pan American Games
4.	9 April 2017	Arena da Amazônia, Manaus, Brazil	Bolivia	6–0	6–0	Friendly
5.	19 April 2018	Estadio La Portada, La Serena, Chile	Argentina	2–0	3–0	2018 Copa América Femenina
6.	23 June 2019	Stade Océane, Le Havre, France	France	1–1	1–2 (a.e.t.)	2019 FIFA Women's World Cup

== Honours ==
Individual

- Serie A Goal of the Year: 2019
