= Nivaldo (footballer, born 1975) =

Brazilian footballer

Personal information
- Full name: Nivaldo Lourenço da Silva
- Date of birth: 28 September 1975 (age 51)
- Place of birth: Xambrê, Brazil
- Height: 1.76 m (5 ft 9 1/2 in)
- Position: Midfielder

Senior career*
Years	Team	Apps	(Gls)
1995–1996	Paraná		
1997–2002	Malutrom		
2003	Montedio Yamagata		
2004	Aparecidense		
2005	Sampaio Corrêa		
2005	Atlético Goianiense		
2006	Shonan Bellmare		
- * Club domestic league appearances and goals

Nivaldo Lourenço da Silva (born 28 September 1975), known simply as Nivaldo, is a former Brazilian football player.

== Club statistics ==
Club performance			League		Cup		Total	
Season	Club	League	Apps	Goals	Apps	Goals	Apps	Goals
Japan			League		Emperor's Cup		Total	
2003	Montedio Yamagata	J2 League	40	2	2	0	42	2
2006	Shonan Bellmare	J2 League	35	1	0	0	35	1
Career total			75	3	2	0	77	3
