= Shigeru Sakurai =

Japanese footballer

Shigeru Sakurai 桜井 繁
Personal information
- Full name: Shigeru Sakurai
- Date of birth: June 29, 1979 (age 47)
- Place of birth: Ibaraki, Japan
- Height: 1.84 m (6 ft 1/2 in)
- Position: Goalkeeper

Youth career
- 1995–1997: Sakai High School
- 1998–2001: Komazawa University

Senior career*
Years	Team	Apps	(Gls)
2002–2006	Montedio Yamagata	133	(0)
2007–2008	Ventforet Kofu	30	(0)
2009–2014	Vegalta Sendai	1	(0)
2015	Tochigi SC	20	(0)
Total		184	(0)
Medal record
Vegalta Sendai
Runner-up	J1 League	2012
- * Club domestic league appearances and goals

Shigeru Sakurai (桜井 繁, Sakurai Shigeru; born June 29, 1979) is a former Japanese football player.

== Playing career ==
Sakurai was born in Ibaraki Prefecture on June 29, 1979. After graduating from Komazawa University, he joined J2 League club Montedio Yamagata in 2002. He became a regular goalkeeper in 2003. However he lost his position behind Kenta Shimizu in 2006. In 2007, he moved to J1 League club Ventforet Kofu. However he could hardly play in the match behind Kensaku Abe and Tatsuya Tsuruta and Ventforet was relegated to J2 end of 2007 season. In 2008, he became a regular goalkeeper. In 2009, he moved to J2 club Vegalta Sendai. Although Vegalta was promoted to J1 end of 2010 season, he could hardly play in the match behind Takuto Hayashi and Kentaro Seki until 2014. In 2015, he moved to J2 club Tochigi SC. He played many matches while battling with Akihiko Takeshige for the position. However Tochigi finished at the bottom place in 2015 season and was relegated to J3 League. He retired end of 2015 season.

== Club statistics ==
Club performance			League		Cup		League Cup		Total	
Season	Club	League	Apps	Goals	Apps	Goals	Apps	Goals	Apps	Goals
Japan			League		Emperor's Cup		J.League Cup		Total	
2002	Montedio Yamagata	J2 League	4	0	1	0	-		5	0
2003	Montedio Yamagata	J2 League	44	0	3	0	-		47	0
2004	Montedio Yamagata	J2 League	40	0	2	0	-		42	0
2005	Montedio Yamagata	J2 League	40	0	1	0	-		41	0
2006	Montedio Yamagata	J2 League	5	0	1	0	-		6	0
Total			133	0	8	0	0	0	141	0
2007	Ventforet Kofu	J1 League	1	0	1	0	0	0	2	0
2008	Ventforet Kofu	J2 League	29	0	0	0	-		29	0
Total			30	0	1	0	0	0	31	0
2009	Vegalta Sendai	J2 League	0	0	1	0	-		1	0
2010	Vegalta Sendai	J1 League	0	0	1	0	2	0	3	0
2011	Vegalta Sendai	J1 League	0	0	1	0	0	0	1	0
2012	Vegalta Sendai	J1 League	0	0	1	0	1	0	2	0
2013	Vegalta Sendai	J1 League	0	0	0	0	2	0	2	0
2014	Vegalta Sendai	J1 League	1	0	0	0	2	0	3	0
Total			1	0	4	0	7	0	12	0
2015	Tochigi SC	J2 League	20	0	1	0	-		21	0
Total			20	0	1	0	-		21	0
Career total			184	0	14	0	7	0	205	0
