= 2003 Montedio Yamagata season =

Montedio Yamagata
2003 season
- Manager: Koichi Hashiratani
- Stadium: Yamagata Park Stadium
- J. League 2: 8th
- Emperor's Cup: 3rd Round
- Top goalscorer: Kosei Nakamura (11)
Home colours	Away colours

2003 Montedio Yamagata season

== Competitions ==
Competitions	Position
J. League 2	8th / 12 clubs
Emperor's Cup	3rd Round

== Domestic results ==
=== J. League 2 ===
Match	Date	Venue	Opponents	Score
1	2003.3.15	Hiratsuka Athletics Stadium	Shonan Bellmare	0-2
2	2003.3.22	Yamagata Park Stadium	Consadole Sapporo	2-3
3	2003.3.29	Hiroshima Stadium	Sanfrecce Hiroshima	1-2
4	2003.4.5	Yamagata Park Stadium	Yokohama F.C.	1-1
5	2003.4.9	Todoroki Athletics Stadium	Kawasaki Frontale	1-5
6	2003.4.12	Ōmiya Park Soccer Stadium	Omiya Ardija	1-2
7	2003.4.19	Yamagata Park Stadium	Sagan Tosu	4-1
8	2003.4.26	Hakatanomori Athletic Stadium	Avispa Fukuoka	2-2
9	2003.4.29	Yamagata Park Stadium	Albirex Niigata	1-0
10	2003.5.5	Kose Sports Stadium	Ventforet Kofu	2-1
11	2003.5.10	Yamagata Park Stadium	Mito HollyHock	1-0
12	2003.5.14	Yamagata Park Stadium	Shonan Bellmare	0-2
13	2003.5.17	Sapporo Atsubetsu Park Stadium	Consadole Sapporo	0-1
14	2003.5.24	Yamagata Park Stadium	Sanfrecce Hiroshima	0-0
15	2003.6.1	Mitsuzawa Stadium	Yokohama F.C.	4-0
16	2003.6.7	Yamagata Park Stadium	Ventforet Kofu	1-0
17	2003.6.14	Mito City Athletic Stadium	Mito HollyHock	2-0
18	2003.6.18	Yamagata Park Stadium	Avispa Fukuoka	0-0
19	2003.6.22	Tosu Stadium	Sagan Tosu	3-1
20	2003.6.28	Ōmiya Park Soccer Stadium	Omiya Ardija	2-0
21	2003.7.2	Yamagata Park Stadium	Kawasaki Frontale	2-2
22	2003.7.5	Niigata Stadium	Albirex Niigata	1-1
23	2003.7.19	Yamagata Park Stadium	Mito HollyHock	0-0
24	2003.7.26	Yamagata Park Stadium	Consadole Sapporo	2-1
25	2003.7.30	Hiratsuka Athletics Stadium	Shonan Bellmare	0-3
26	2003.8.3	Yamagata Park Stadium	Yokohama F.C.	1-2
27	2003.8.10	Kose Sports Stadium	Ventforet Kofu	1-2
28	2003.8.16	Yamagata Park Stadium	Sagan Tosu	1-1
29	2003.8.23	Yamagata Park Stadium	Omiya Ardija	1-0
30	2003.8.30	Todoroki Athletics Stadium	Kawasaki Frontale	1-2
31	2003.9.3	Hakatanomori Athletic Stadium	Avispa Fukuoka	0-1
32	2003.9.6	Yamagata Park Stadium	Albirex Niigata	1-2
33	2003.9.13	Hiroshima Stadium	Sanfrecce Hiroshima	0-1
34	2003.9.20	Tosu Stadium	Sagan Tosu	1-0
35	2003.9.23	Yamagata Park Stadium	Omiya Ardija	1-0
36	2003.9.27	Mito City Athletic Stadium	Mito HollyHock	0-1
37	2003.10.5	Yamagata Park Stadium	Avispa Fukuoka	3-3
38	2003.10.11	Niigata Stadium	Albirex Niigata	1-4
39	2003.10.18	Yamagata Park Stadium	Ventforet Kofu	2-1
40	2003.10.25	Yamagata Park Stadium	Kawasaki Frontale	0-0
41	2003.11.1	Mitsuzawa Stadium	Yokohama F.C.	2-4
42	2003.11.8	Yamagata Park Stadium	Sanfrecce Hiroshima	1-2
43	2003.11.16	Sapporo Dome	Consadole Sapporo	1-4
44	2003.11.23	Yamagata Park Stadium	Shonan Bellmare	1-0

=== Emperor's Cup ===
Match	Date	Venue	Opponents	Score
1st Round	2003..	[[]]	[[]]	-
2nd Round	2003..	[[]]	[[]]	-
3rd Round	2003..	[[]]	[[]]	-

== Player statistics ==
No.	Pos.	Player	D.o.B. (Age)	Height / Weight	J. League 2		Emperor's Cup		Total	
No.	Pos.	Player	D.o.B. (Age)	Height / Weight	Apps	Goals	Apps	Goals	Apps	Goals
1	GK	Katsumi Suzuki	April 21, 1969 (aged 33)	cm / kg	0	0				
2	DF	Masayuki Ota	June 17, 1973 (aged 29)	cm / kg	29	0				
3	DF	Tsuyoshi Furukawa	September 21, 1972 (aged 30)	cm / kg	39	0				
4	DF	Masakazu Washida	November 15, 1978 (aged 24)	cm / kg	36	1				
5	MF	Nivaldo	September 28, 1975 (aged 27)	cm / kg	40	2				
6	MF	Hayato Ochi	July 17, 1982 (aged 20)	cm / kg	2	0				
7	MF	Kenji Takahashi	June 5, 1970 (aged 32)	cm / kg	41	2				
8	MF	Atsushi Nagai	December 23, 1974 (aged 28)	cm / kg	42	1				
9	FW	Hideo Ōshima	March 7, 1980 (aged 23)	cm / kg	42	9				
10	FW	Alexandre Bortolato	November 10, 1973 (aged 29)	cm / kg	15	1				
11	FW	Toshiaki Haji	August 28, 1978 (aged 24)	cm / kg	28	6				
13	DF	Toshihiko Uchiyama	October 21, 1978 (aged 24)	cm / kg	33	0				
14	DF	Yuki Inoue	October 31, 1977 (aged 25)	cm / kg	31	1				
15	MF	Jun Kokubo	September 8, 1980 (aged 22)	cm / kg	32	2				
16	GK	Shigeru Sakurai	June 29, 1979 (aged 23)	cm / kg	44	0				
17	FW	Kosei Nakamura	April 5, 1981 (aged 21)	cm / kg	40	11				
18	FW	Masatoshi Matsuda	September 4, 1980 (aged 22)	cm / kg	9	4				
19	MF	Daisuke Hoshi	December 10, 1980 (aged 22)	cm / kg	38	9				
20	FW	Ryosuke Nemoto	August 24, 1980 (aged 22)	cm / kg	5	0				
21	GK	Koichi Ae	April 15, 1976 (aged 26)	cm / kg	0	0				
22	DF	Mitsumasa Yoda	August 7, 1977 (aged 25)	cm / kg	12	0				
23	MF	Yoshimasa Fujita	July 23, 1979 (aged 23)	cm / kg	0	0				
24	DF	Shingo Itō	April 28, 1979 (aged 23)	cm / kg	3	0				
25	MF	Kentaro Kawasaki	December 18, 1982 (aged 20)	cm / kg	21	1				
26	DF	Kazuyuki Matsuda	April 14, 1979 (aged 23)	cm / kg	0	0				
27	MF	Masaru Akiba	February 19, 1984 (aged 19)	cm / kg	17	0				
28	DF	Naoya Otaki	June 11, 1984 (aged 18)	cm / kg	0	0				
29	GK	Takeshi Saito	June 1, 1979 (aged 23)	cm / kg	0	0				
30	DF	Teruaki Kobayashi	June 20, 1979 (aged 23)	cm / kg	9	1				

== Other pages ==
- (in Japanese) J. League official site
