= Kentaro Kawasaki =

Japanese footballer

Kentaro Kawasaki 川崎 健太郎
Personal information
- Full name: Kentaro Kawasaki
- Date of birth: December 18, 1982 (age 43)
- Place of birth: Osaka, Japan
- Height: 1.75 m (5 ft 9 in)
- Position: Midfielder

Youth career
- 1998–2000: Cerezo Osaka

Senior career*
Years	Team	Apps	(Gls)
2001–2002	Cerezo Osaka	0	(0)
2002	Sagawa Express Osaka	6	(0)
2003–2005	Montedio Yamagata	38	(1)
2006–2007	Consadole Sapporo	6	(0)
2008–2010	Kataller Toyama	65	(1)
Total		115	(2)
Medal record
Cerezo Osaka
Runner-up	Emperor's Cup	2001
- * Club domestic league appearances and goals

Kentaro Kawasaki (川崎 健太郎, Kawasaki Kentaro; born December 18, 1982) is a former Japanese football player.

== Playing career ==
Kawasaki was born in Osaka on December 18, 1982. He joined J1 League club Cerezo Osaka in 2001. However he could not play at all in the match. In September 2002, he moved to Japan Football League (JFL) club Sagawa Express Osaka and played several matches. In 2003, he moved to J2 League club Montedio Yamagata. He played many matches as substitute player in 2003. However his opportunity to play decreased from 2004. In 2006, he moved to J2club Consadole Sapporo. However he could hardly play in the match in 2 seasons. In 2008, he moved to JFL club Kataller Toyama. Although he could not become a regular player for injury, he played many matches and Kataller was promoted to J2 end of 2008 season. He became a regular player in June 2009 and played many matches until end of 2009 season. However his opportunity to play decreased in 2010 and he retired end of 2010 season.

== Club statistics ==
Club performance			League		Cup		League Cup		Total	
Season	Club	League	Apps	Goals	Apps	Goals	Apps	Goals	Apps	Goals
Japan			League		Emperor's Cup		J.League Cup		Total	
2001	Cerezo Osaka	J1 League	0	0	0	0	0	0	0	0
2002	Cerezo Osaka	J2 League	0	0	0	0	-		0	0
2002	Sagawa Express Osaka	Football League	6	0	2	0	-		8	0
2003	Montedio Yamagata	J2 League	21	1	3	2	-		24	3
2004	Montedio Yamagata	J2 League	14	0	0	0	-		14	0
2005	Montedio Yamagata	J2 League	3	0	0	0	-		3	0
2006	Consadole Sapporo	J2 League	4	0	4	0	-		8	0
2007	Consadole Sapporo	J2 League	2	0	1	0	-		3	0
2008	Kataller Toyama	Football League	13	0	0	0	-		13	0
2009	Kataller Toyama	J2 League	35	1	2	1	-		37	2
2010	Kataller Toyama	J2 League	17	0	1	0	-		18	0
Career total			115	2	13	3	0	0	128	5
