= Mizubayashi Athletic Field =

Sports Stadium in Japan

- 由利本荘市本荘由利総合運動公園水林陸上競技場
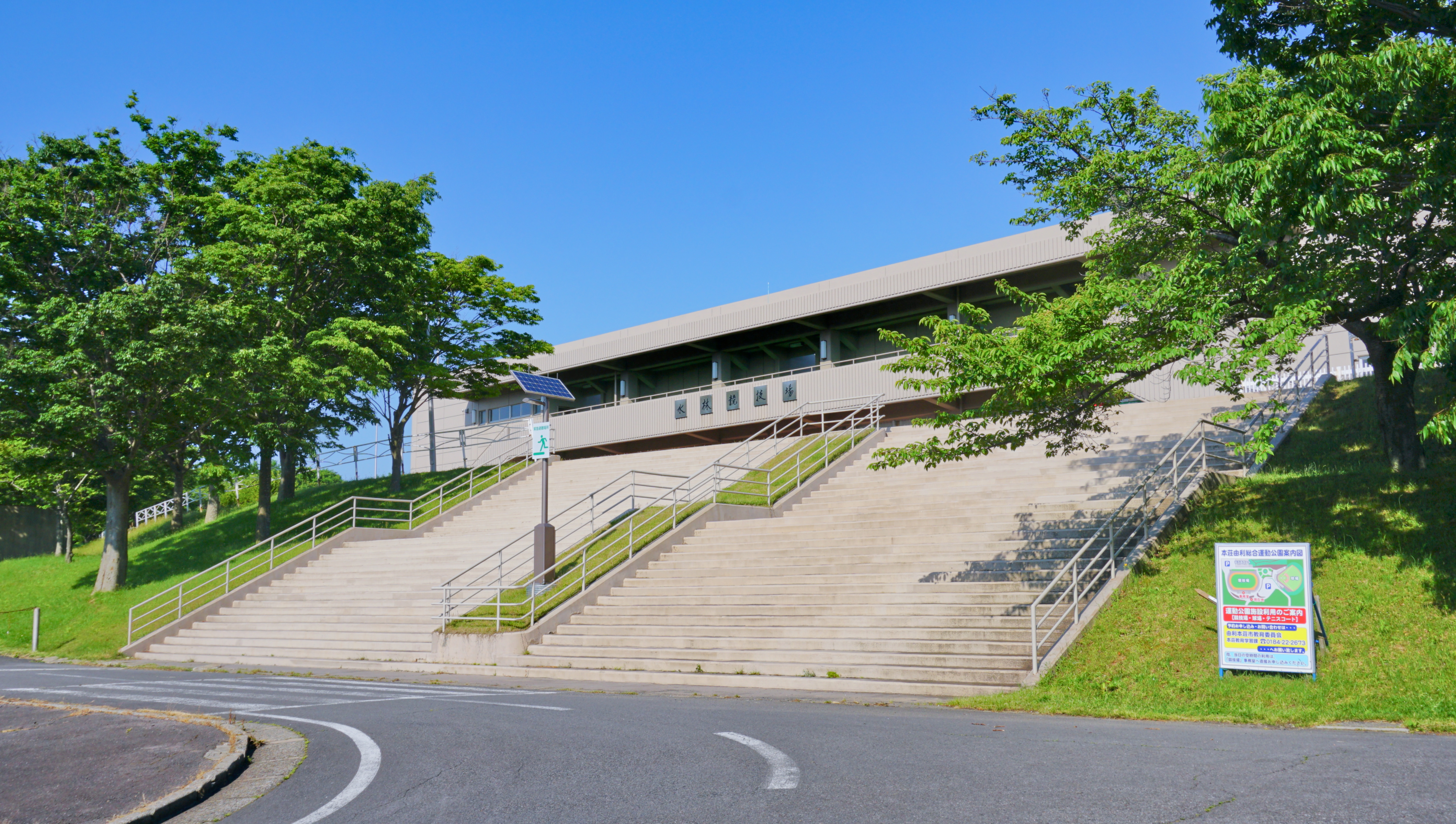
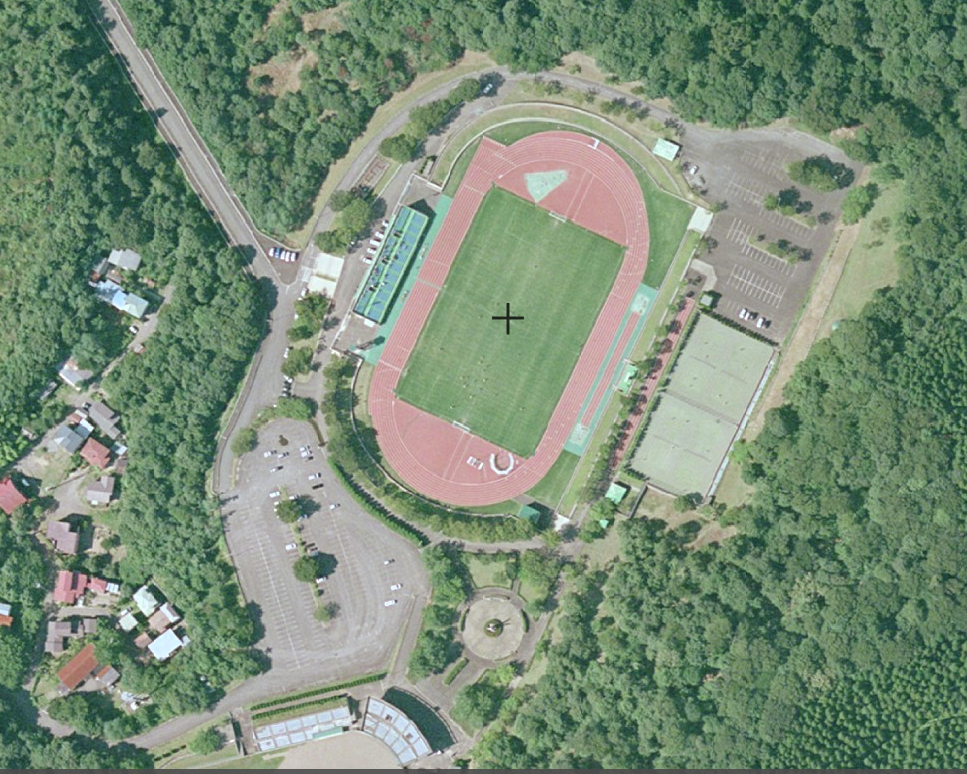

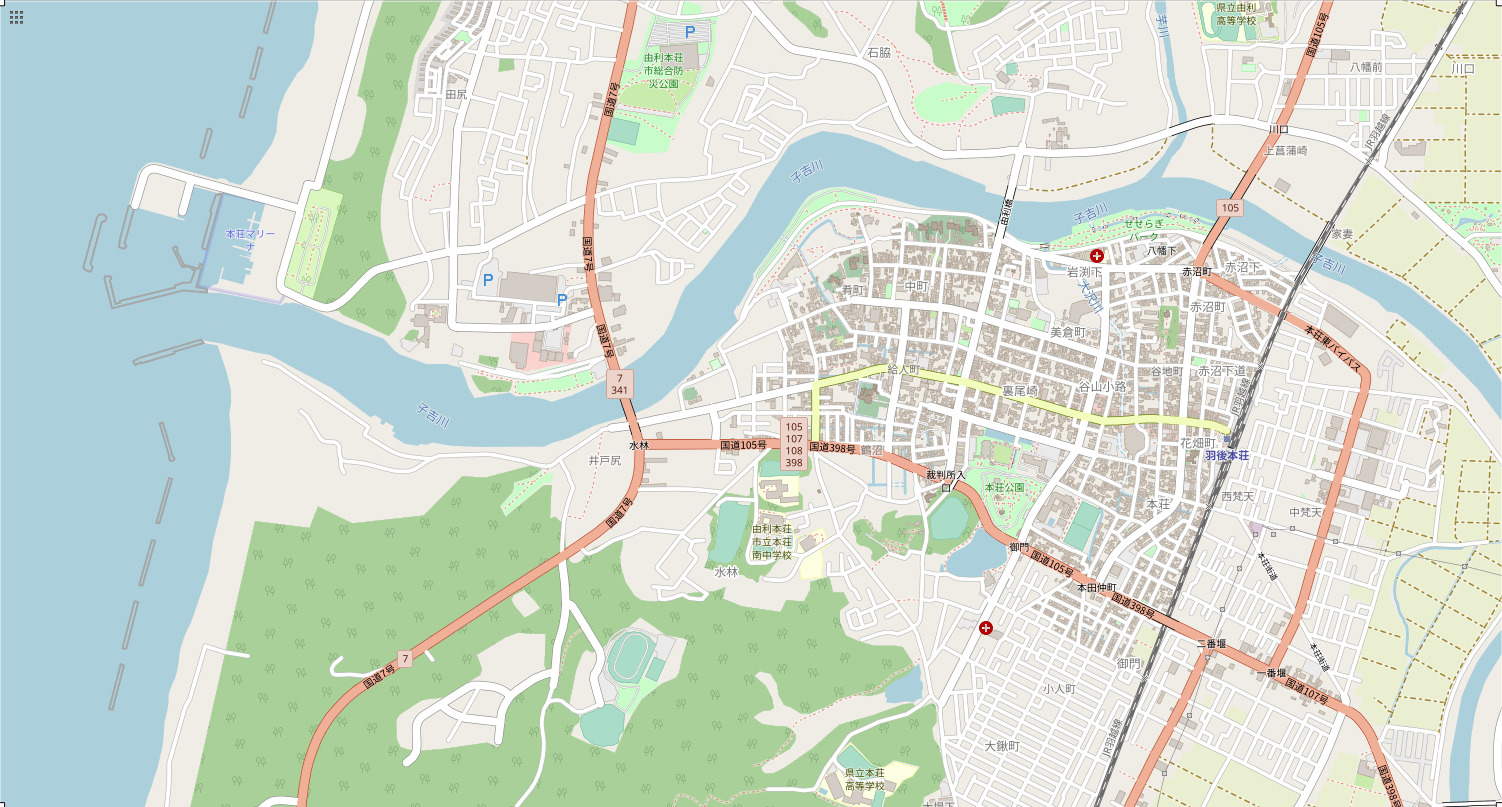
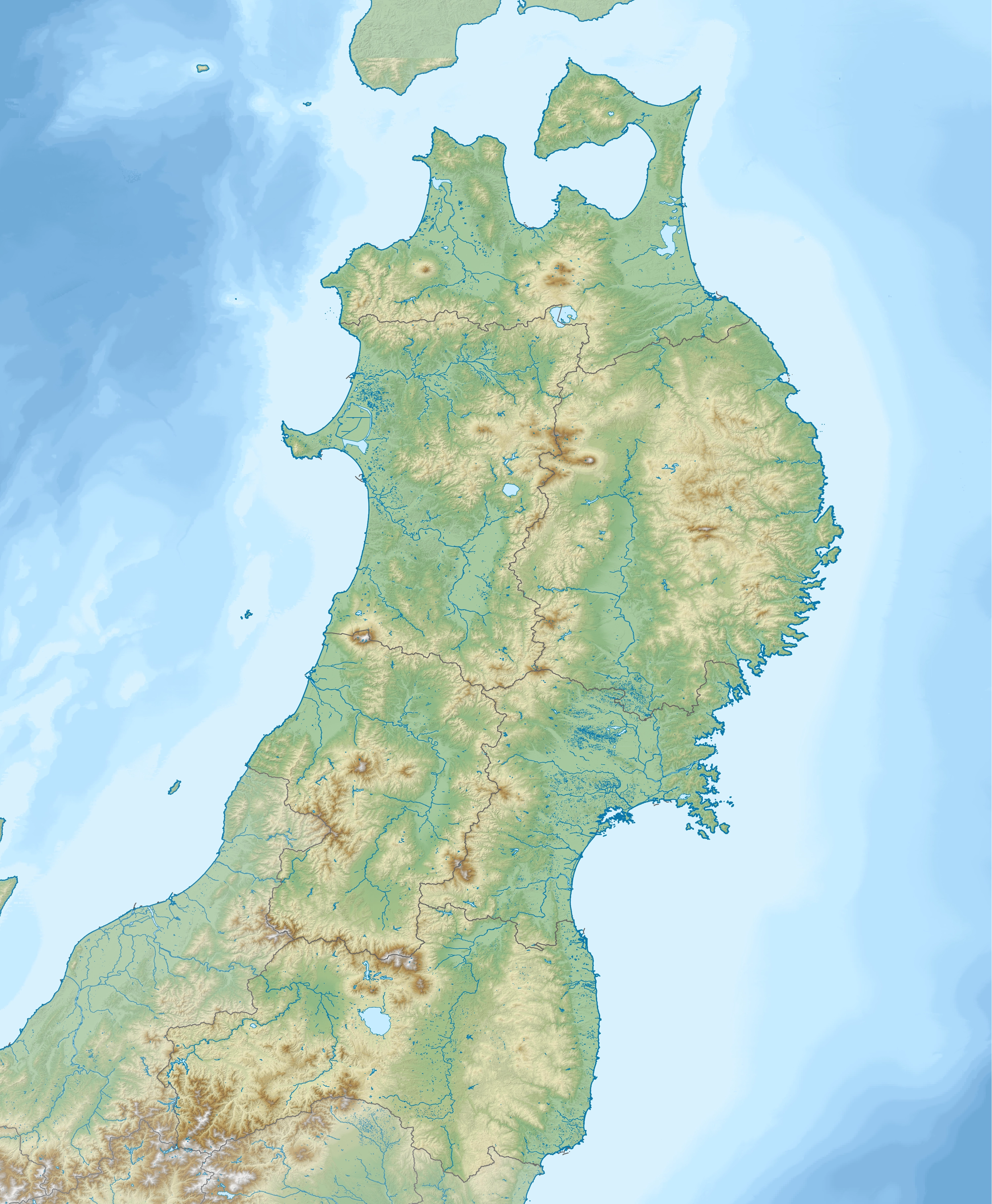
- Location within Honjo, Akita Location within Akita Prefecture Location within Tohoku, Japan Location within Japan
- Interactive map of Mizubayashi Athletic Field
- Full name: Honjo Yuri General Sports Park Mizubayashi Athletic Field
- Location: Yurihonjo, Akita, Japan
- Coordinates: 39°22′45.6″N 140°1′53.9″E
- Owner: City of Yurihonjo
- Operator: City of Yurihonjo
- Capacity: 10,000
- Surface: Turf
- Field size: 100m×65m
- Parking: 200 spaces

Construction
- Opened: 1978

Tenants
- TDK SC; TDK Shinwakai; Akita FC Cambiare

Honjo Yuri General Sports Park Mizubayashi Athletic Field (本荘由利総合運動公園水林陸上競技場) is a multi-purpose stadium at the Honjo Yuri General Sports Park in Yurihonjo, Akita, Japan. The stadium was originally opened in 1978 and has a capacity of 10,000 spectators. It is the former home ground of TDK SC, and the Sports Park has a Baseball Stadium and tennis courts.
