= Kosei Nakamura =

Japanese footballer

Kosei Nakamura 中村 幸聖
Personal information
- Full name: Kosei Nakamura
- Date of birth: April 5, 1981 (age 45)
- Place of birth: Kumamoto, Japan
- Height: 1.71 m (5 ft 7 1/2 in)
- Position: Forward

Team information
- Current team: BG Tampines Rovers (Assistant Coach); Singapore (Assistant Coach); BG Tampines Rovers II (Head Coach)

Youth career
- 1997–1999: Ozu High School

Senior career*
| Years | Team | Apps | (Gls) |
| 2000–2002 | Kashima Antlers | 2 | (0) |
| 2003–2004 | Montedio Yamagata | 49 | (13) |
| 2005–2006 | Albirex Niigata | 0 | (0) |
| 2005 | →Albirex Niigata (S) (loan) | 15 | (7) |
| Total | | 66 | (20) |

Managerial career
- 2019–2021: Kashima Antlers U18
- 2022–2024: Kashima Antlers (assistant)
- 2024–2025: Young Lions (assistant)
- 2024–2025: Singapore U23 (assistant)
- 2024–: Singapore (assistant)
- 2025–: BG Tampines Rovers (assistant)
Medal record
Kashima Antlers
| Winner | J1 League | 2000 |
| Winner | J1 League | 2001 |
| Winner | J.League Cup | 2000 |
| Winner | J.League Cup | 2002 |
| Winner | Emperor's Cup | 2000 |
| Runner-up | Emperor's Cup | 2002 |
- * Club domestic league appearances and goals

Kosei Nakamura (中村 幸聖, Nakamura Kōsei; born April 5, 1981) is a Japanese football coach and former football player, who is the assistant coach of BG Tampines Rovers, Singapore and the head coach of BG Tampines Rovers II.

== Playing career ==
Nakamura was born in Kumamoto Prefecture on April 5, 1981. After graduating from high school, he joined J1 League club Kashima Antlers in 2000. On May 3, he debuted as substitute forward from the 82nd minute against Verdy Kawasaki. However he could hardly play in the match until 2002. In 2003, he moved to J2 League club Montedio Yamagata. He played many matches and scored 11 goals in 2003. However he could not play many matches in 2004. In 2005, he moved to J1 club Albirex Niigata. However he could not play at all in the match. In June 2005, he moved to Albirex Niigata Singapore on loan and played many matches. In 2006, he returned to Albirex Niigata. However he could not play at all in the match and retired end of 2006 season.

== Club statistics ==
| Club performance | | | League | | Cup | | League Cup | | Total | |
| Season | Club | League | Apps | Goals | Apps | Goals | Apps | Goals | Apps | Goals |
| Japan | | | League | | Emperor's Cup | | J.League Cup | | Total | |
|---|---|---|---|---|---|---|---|---|---|---|
| 2000 | Kashima Antlers | J1 League | 1 | 0 | 0 | 0 | 0 | 0 | 1 | 0 |
| 2001 | Kashima Antlers | J1 League | 0 | 0 | 0 | 0 | 0 | 0 | 0 | 0 |
| 2002 | Kashima Antlers | J1 League | 1 | 0 | 0 | 0 | 4 | 1 | 5 | 1 |
| 2003 | Montedio Yamagata | J2 League | 40 | 11 | 3 | 1 | - | | 43 | 12 |
| 2004 | Montedio Yamagata | J2 League | 9 | 2 | 0 | 0 | - | | 9 | 2 |
| 2005 | Albirex Niigata | J1 League | 0 | 0 | 0 | 0 | 0 | 0 | 0 | 0 |
| Singapore | | | League | | Singapore Cup | | League Cup | | Total | |
| 2005 | Albirex Niigata Singapore | S.League | 15 | 7 | | | | | 15 | 7 |
| Japan | | | League | | Emperor's Cup | | J.League Cup | | Total | |
| 2006 | Albirex Niigata | J1 League | 0 | 0 | 0 | 0 | 0 | 0 | 0 | 0 |
| Total | Japan | | 51 | 13 | 3 | 1 | 4 | 1 | 58 | 15 |
| Total | Singapore | | 15 | 7 | | | | | 15 | 7 |
| Career total | | | 66 | 20 | 3 | 1 | 4 | 1 | 73 | 22 |
