= Masatoshi Matsuda =

Japanese footballer

Masatoshi Matsuda 松田 正俊
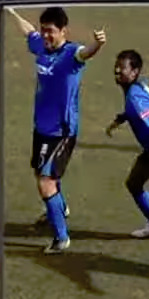

Personal information
- Full name: Masatoshi Matsuda
- Date of birth: September 4, 1980 (age 46)
- Place of birth: Chiba, Japan
- Height: 1.85 m (6 ft 1 in)
- Position: Forward

Youth career
- 1996–1998: Funabashi High School

Senior career*
Years	Team	Apps	(Gls)
1999–2002	FC Tokyo	4	(0)
1999	→Yokohama FC (loan)	9	(3)
2001	→Ventforet Kofu (loan)	12	(2)
2003–2004	Montedio Yamagata	14	(5)
2005–2006	Kyoto Purple Sanga	33	(10)
2007	TDK	32	(18)
2008–2009	Tochigi SC	39	(7)
2009–2013	Blaublitz Akita	138	(73)
Total		281	(118)
- * Club domestic league appearances and goals

Masatoshi Matsuda (松田 正俊, Matsuda Masatoshi; born September 4, 1980) is a former Japanese football player.

== Early life ==
Matsuda was born in Chiba on September 4, 1980.

== Playing career ==
After graduating from high school, he joined newly promoted J2 League club FC Tokyo in 1999. However he couldn't break into the team.

In August 1999, he moved to Japan Football League (JFL) club Yokohama FC on loan. He played many matches as forward and the club won the league as champions.

In 2000, he returned to FC Tokyo. Although the club was promoted to the J1 League from 2000, he struggled for minutes.

In September 2001, he moved to J2 club Ventforet Kofu on loan and played many matches.

In 2002, he returned to FC Tokyo. However, he struggled for minutes.

In 2003, he moved to J2 club Montedio Yamagata. Although he scored many goals, he got hurt in May and he could not play until the end of the 2003 season. In 2004, he could hardly play for the team.

In 2005, he moved to J2 club Kyoto Purple Sanga. Although he could not play many matches, he scored 8 goals in 2005 and the club was promoted to J1 from 2006.

In 2007, he moved to JFL club TDK (later Blaublitz Akita). He played as regular player and scored 18 goals.

In 2008, he moved to JFL club Tochigi SC. He played many matches and the club was promoted to the J2 league in 2009.

In September 2009, he moved to TDK again. He played as regular player and scored many goals every season. He also became a top scorer with 20 goals in 2011. He retired end of 2013 season.

== Club statistics ==
Club performance			League		Cup		League Cup		Total	
Season	Club	League	Apps	Goals	Apps	Goals	Apps	Goals	Apps	Goals
Japan			League		Emperor's Cup		J.League Cup		Total	
1999	FC Tokyo	J2 League	0	0	0	0	0	0	0	0
Total			0	0	0	0	0	0	0	0
1999	Yokohama FC	Football League	9	3	3	3	-		12	6
Total			9	3	3	3	-		12	6
2000	FC Tokyo	J1 League	1	0	0	0	0	0	1	0
2001	FC Tokyo	J1 League	1	0	0	0	0	0	1	0
Total			2	0	0	0	0	0	2	0
2001	Ventforet Kofu	J2 League	12	2	3	2	0	0	15	4
Total			12	2	3	2	0	0	15	4
2002	FC Tokyo	J1 League	2	0	1	0	1	0	4	0
Total			2	0	1	0	1	0	4	0
2003	Montedio Yamagata	J2 League	9	4	0	0	-		9	4
2004	Montedio Yamagata	J2 League	5	1	1	0	-		6	1
Total			14	4	1	0	-		15	4
2005	Kyoto Purple Sanga	J2 League	19	8	1	0	-		20	8
2006	Kyoto Purple Sanga	J1 League	14	2	0	0	4	1	18	3
Total			33	10	1	0	4	1	38	11
2007	TDK	Football League	32	18	4	5	-		36	23
Total			32	18	4	5	-		36	23
2008	Tochigi SC	Football League	22	6	2	0	-		24	6
2009	Tochigi SC	J2 League	17	1	0	0	-		17	1
Total			39	7	2	0	-		41	7
2009	TDK	Football League	8	7	0	0	-		8	7
Total			8	7	0	0	-		8	7
2010	Blaublitz Akita	Football League	34	24	1	0	-		35	24
2011	Blaublitz Akita	Football League	33	20	2	5	-		35	25
2012	Blaublitz Akita	Football League	32	12	2	0	-		34	12
2013	Blaublitz Akita	Football League	31	10	2	0	-		33	10
Total			138	73	7	5	-		145	78
Career total			281	118	21	15	5	1	307	134
