= 2015 Tochigi SC season =

Tochigi SC
2015 season
- Manager: Yuji Sakakura; Yasuharu Kurata
- Stadium: Tochigi Green Stadium
- J2 League: 22nd
Home colours	Away colours

2015 Tochigi SC season.

== League table ==
Pos	Team	Pld	W	D	L	GF	GA	GD	Pts	Promotion, qualification or relegation
18	Thespakusatsu Gunma	42	13	9	20	34	56	−22	48	
19	Mito HollyHock	42	10	16	16	40	47	−7	46	
20	FC Gifu	42	12	7	23	37	71	−34	43	
21	Oita Trinita (R)	42	8	14	20	41	51	−10	38	Qualification for relegation playoffs (Note: The playoffs and direct exchange between J2 and J3 are subject to eligibility of J2-licensed teams in top 2 of 2015 J3 League.)
22	Tochigi SC (R)	42	7	14	21	39	64	−25	35	Relegation to 2016 J3 League

Source: Meiji Yasuda J2 League Standing
Rules for classification: 1) Points; 2) Goal difference; 3) Goals scored
(R) Relegated

== J2 League ==
=== League table ===
Pos	Team	Pld	W	D	L	GF	GA	GD	Pts	Promotion, qualification or relegation
20	FC Gifu	42	12	7	23	37	71	−34	43	
21	Oita Trinita (R)	42	8	14	20	41	51	−10	38	Qualification for relegation playoffs (Note: The playoffs and direct exchange between J2 and J3 are subject to eligibility of J2-licensed teams in top 2 of 2015 J3 League.)
22	Tochigi SC (R)	42	7	14	21	39	64	−25	35	Relegation to 2016 J3 League

Source: Meiji Yasuda J2 League Standing
Rules for classification: 1) Points; 2) Goal difference; 3) Goals scored
(R) Relegated

=== Match details ===
J2 League match details
Match	Date	Team	Score	Team	Venue	Attendance
1	2015.03.08	Tochigi SC	1-2	Consadole Sapporo	Tochigi Green Stadium	7,146
2	2015.03.15	Yokohama FC	1-1	Tochigi SC	NHK Spring Mitsuzawa Football Stadium	6,794
3	2015.03.21	Tochigi SC	1-1	JEF United Chiba	Tochigi Green Stadium	5,479
4	2015.03.29	Tochigi SC	2-1	Tokushima Vortis	Tochigi Green Stadium	2,846
5	2015.04.01	Júbilo Iwata	3-0	Tochigi SC	Yamaha Stadium	6,946
6	2015.04.05	V-Varen Nagasaki	1-0	Tochigi SC	Nagasaki Stadium	2,858
7	2015.04.11	Tochigi SC	2-4	Giravanz Kitakyushu	Tochigi Green Stadium	3,125
8	2015.04.19	FC Gifu	0-1	Tochigi SC	Gifu Nagaragawa Stadium	4,008
9	2015.04.26	Tochigi SC	0-1	Ehime FC	Tochigi Green Stadium	3,832
10	2015.04.29	Oita Trinita	0-1	Tochigi SC	Oita Bank Dome	6,543
11	2015.05.03	Tochigi SC	2-2	Roasso Kumamoto	Tochigi Green Stadium	3,761
12	2015.05.06	Fagiano Okayama	0-0	Tochigi SC	City Light Stadium	9,599
13	2015.05.09	Tochigi SC	0-0	Avispa Fukuoka	Tochigi Green Stadium	3,575
14	2015.05.17	Kamatamare Sanuki	0-0	Tochigi SC	Kagawa Marugame Stadium	2,389
15	2015.05.24	Tochigi SC	1-1	Zweigen Kanazawa	Tochigi Green Stadium	4,852
16	2015.05.31	Tokyo Verdy	3-2	Tochigi SC	Ajinomoto Stadium	3,594
17	2015.06.06	Tochigi SC	5-1	Thespakusatsu Gunma	Tochigi Green Stadium	4,525
18	2015.06.14	Tochigi SC	0-2	Omiya Ardija	Tochigi Green Stadium	8,595
19	2015.06.21	Kyoto Sanga FC	1-2	Tochigi SC	Kyoto Nishikyogoku Athletic Stadium	3,904
20	2015.06.28	Tochigi SC	0-3	Cerezo Osaka	Tochigi Green Stadium	7,077
21	2015.07.04	Mito HollyHock	2-1	Tochigi SC	K's denki Stadium Mito	3,744
22	2015.07.08	Ehime FC	0-0	Tochigi SC	Ningineer Stadium	1,722
23	2015.07.12	Tochigi SC	0-2	Júbilo Iwata	Tochigi Green Stadium	5,888
24	2015.07.18	Thespakusatsu Gunma	1-0	Tochigi SC	Shoda Shoyu Stadium Gunma	3,337
25	2015.07.22	Tochigi SC	1-0	Kamatamare Sanuki	Tochigi Green Stadium	2,581
26	2015.07.26	Tochigi SC	2-2	Fagiano Okayama	Tochigi Green Stadium	5,395
27	2015.08.01	Roasso Kumamoto	2-0	Tochigi SC	Umakana-Yokana Stadium	5,116
28	2015.08.08	Omiya Ardija	1-0	Tochigi SC	NACK5 Stadium Omiya	9,564
29	2015.08.15	Tochigi SC	2-1	Yokohama FC	Tochigi Green Stadium	5,891
30	2015.08.23	Tochigi SC	0-1	FC Gifu	Tochigi Green Stadium	5,173
31	2015.09.13	Cerezo Osaka	4-1	Tochigi SC	Kincho Stadium	11,093
32	2015.09.20	Tochigi SC	2-2	Mito HollyHock	Tochigi Green Stadium	4,769
33	2015.09.23	JEF United Chiba	2-0	Tochigi SC	Fukuda Denshi Arena	8,938
34	2015.09.27	Tochigi SC	0-1	V-Varen Nagasaki	Tochigi Green Stadium	3,812
35	2015.10.04	Zweigen Kanazawa	2-2	Tochigi SC	Ishikawa Athletics Stadium	3,217
36	2015.10.10	Tochigi SC	1-1	Oita Trinita	Tochigi Green Stadium	6,717
37	2015.10.18	Avispa Fukuoka	4-2	Tochigi SC	Level5 Stadium	8,749
38	2015.10.25	Tochigi SC	0-1	Tokyo Verdy	Tochigi Green Stadium	9,319
39	2015.11.01	Tokushima Vortis	1-1	Tochigi SC	Pocarisweat Stadium	3,634
40	2015.11.08	Giravanz Kitakyushu	2-2	Tochigi SC	Honjo Stadium	2,487
41	2015.11.14	Tochigi SC	0-1	Kyoto Sanga FC	Tochigi Green Stadium	4,143
42	2015.11.23	Consadole Sapporo	4-1	Tochigi SC	Sapporo Dome	20,234
