= Keita Hidaka =

Japanese footballer

Personal information
- Full name: Keita Hidaka
- Date of birth: 19 February 1990 (age 36)
- Place of birth: Setagaya, Japan
- Height: 1.77 m (5 ft 10 in)
- Position: Midfielder

Team information
- Current team: FC Osaka
- Number: 8

Youth career
- –2004: Yokohama F. Marinos
- 2005–2007: Toko Gakuen High School

College career
Years	Team	Apps	(Gls)
2008–2011	Keio University		

Senior career*
Years	Team	Apps	(Gls)
2012–2015	Montedio Yamagata	9	(0)
2013	→ Machida Zelvia (loan)	6	(0)
2016–2018	Blaublitz Akita	65	(3)
2019	Vanraure Hachinohe	14	(0)
2020–2021	Tokyo United	9	(0)
2020	Vanraure Hachinohe (loan)	14	(0)
2021–	FC Osaka	47	(2)
Medal record
Montedio Yamagata
Runner-up	Emperor's Cup	2014
- * Club domestic league appearances and goals as of 14/1/24 @ 15:36(AEST)

Keita Hidaka (日髙 慶太, Hidaka Keita; born 19 February 1990) is a Japanese footballer who currently plays as a midfielder for FC Osaka.

== Career ==
=== Montedio Yamagata ===
Hidaka made his official debut for Montedio Yamagata in the J. League Division 2, J. League Cup on 10 September 2014, against Sagan Tosu in Best Amenity Stadium in Tosu, Japan. He started and finished the match which managed to reach extra time. Hidaka and his club lost the match 1-0 due to Hiroki Bandai's late 107th-minute goal after just being subbed in three minutes earlier.

== Club statistics ==
Updated to 23 February 2017.

Club performance			League		Cup		League Cup		Total	
Season	Club	League	Apps	Goals	Apps	Goals	Apps	Goals	Apps	Goals
Club			League		Emperor's Cup		J. League Cup		Total	
2012	Montedio Yamagata	J2 League	0	0	0	0	–		0	0
2013	Montedio Yamagata	J2 League	0	0	–		–		0	0
2013	Machida Zelvia	JFL	6	0	–		–		6	0
2012	Montedio Yamagata	J2 League	1	0	2	0	–		3	0
2015	Montedio Yamagata	J1 League	0	0	1	0	5	0	6	0
2016	Blaublitz Akita	J3 League	29	2	2	0	–		31	2
Total			36	2	5	0	6	0	47	2

== Honours ==
Blaublitz Akita

- J3 League (1): 2017
