= 1996 JEF United Ichihara season =

JEF United Ichihara
1996 season
- Manager: Yasuhiko Okudera
- Stadium: Ichihara Stadium
- J.League: 9th
- Emperor's Cup: 3rd Round
- J.League Cup: GL-B 4th
- Top goalscorer: League: Hašek (12); All: Hašek (18)
- Highest home attendance: 13,652 (vs Júbilo Iwata, 13 April 1996); 40,016 (vs Kashima Antlers, 4 May 1996, Tokyo National Stadium)
- Lowest home attendance: 7,142 (vs Kyoto Purple Sanga, 28 September 1996)
- Average home league attendance: 12,008
Home colours	Away colours

1996 JEF United Ichihara season

== Review and events ==
=== League results summary ===
Overall								Home						Away					
Pld	W	D	L	GF	GA	GD	Pts	W	D	L	GF	GA	GD	W	D	L	GF	GA	GD
30	13	0	17	45	47	−2	40	7	0	8	21	24	−3	6	0	9	24	23	+1

Source: J.LEAGUE OFFICIAL GUIDE 1997. ISBN 4-09-102329-0.

=== League results by round ===
Round	1	2	3	4	5	6	7	8	9	10	11	12	13	14	15	16	17	18	19	20	21	22	23	24	25	26	27	28	29	30
Ground	H	A	H	A	H	A	H	A	H	H	A	H	A	H	A	A	H	A	H	A	H	A	H	A	H	A	H	A	H	A
Result	L	W	L	W	L	L	L	L	W	W	L	W	W	W	W	L	W	L	L	W	W	W	L	L	L	L	W	L	L	L
Position	13	7	9	7	9	10	11	13	12	11	12	10	9	8	8	9	9	9	9	9	8	8	8	8	8	8	8	8	8	9

Source: J.LEAGUE OFFICIAL GUIDE 1997. ISBN 4-09-102329-0.
A = Away; H = Home; W = Win; D = Draw; L = Loss

== Competitions ==
Competitions	Position
J.League	9th / 16 clubs
Emperor's Cup	3rd round
J.League Cup	GL-B 4th / 8 clubs

== Domestic results ==
=== J.League ===
16 March 1996 1	JEF United Ichihara	0–1	Sanfrecce Hiroshima	Ichihara Stadium
17:04 JST (UTC+09)		J. League	Huistra 60'	Attendance: 10,722; Referee: Keiichi Sunakawa; Assistant referees: Takashi Kunori, Kenichi Koshiyama; Fourth official: Terunobu Kakinuma

20 March 1996 2	Kyoto Purple Sanga	0–2	JEF United Ichihara	Kyoto Nishikyogoku Stadium
15:04 JST (UTC+09)		J. League	Nakanishi 11'; Mutō 64'	Attendance: 8,318; Referee: Zoran Petrović; Assistant referees: Naoki Esumi, Hideaki Harada; Fourth official: Hiroyuki Ishida

23 March 1996 3	JEF United Ichihara	0–2	Bellmare Hiratsuka	Ichihara Stadium
15:01 JST (UTC+09)		J. League	Seki 70'; Noguchi 85'	Attendance: 10,293; Referee: Yoshimi Ogawa; Assistant referees: Kōji Taniuchi, Masaaki Shimomura; Fourth official: Katsuhiko Takayama

30 March 1996 4	Kashiwa Reysol	0–2	JEF United Ichihara	Hitachi Kashiwa Soccer Stadium
15:01 JST (UTC+09)		J. League	Ejiri 53'; Maslovar 65'	Attendance: 10,272; Referee: Tōru Kamikawa; Assistant referees: Hiroshi Fukuda, Sōichirō Kaneko; Fourth official: Fujirō Masukura

3 April 1996 5	JEF United Ichihara	0–1	Avispa Fukuoka	Ichihara Stadium
19:01 JST (UTC+09)		J. League	Maradona 29'	Attendance: 8,028; Referee: Shinichirō Obata; Assistant referees: Yū Nakamura, Takao Onshi; Fourth official: Kōji Sugikawa

6 April 1996 6	Yokohama Marinos	2–1	JEF United Ichihara	Tokyo National Stadium
19:04 JST (UTC+09)	Acosta 52', 61'	J. League	Nakanishi 87'	Attendance: 28,584; Referee: Masayoshi Okada; Assistant referees: Kazuhisa Osada, Kōji Taniuchi; Fourth official: Masao Yamanaka

13 April 1996 7	JEF United Ichihara	2–4	Júbilo Iwata	Ichihara Stadium
19:04 JST (UTC+09)	Nakanishi 62'; Hašek 86'	J. League	Nakayama 45'; Fukunishi 55'; Nanami 67'; Takeda 81'	Attendance: 13,652; Referee: Piotr Werner; Assistant referees: Masahiro Katagiri, Akihisa Makino; Fourth official: Kazuya Isokawa

17 April 1996 8	Urawa Red Diamonds	1–0	JEF United Ichihara	Urawa Komaba Stadium
19:03 JST (UTC+09)	Hirose 4' (pen.)	J. League		Attendance: 19,366; Referee: Keiichi Sunakawa; Assistant referees: Kenichi Koshiyama, Takayoshi Kashino; Fourth official: Izumi Okada

20 April 1996 9	JEF United Ichihara	3–0	Nagoya Grampus Eight	Niigata Stadium
15:03 JST (UTC+09)	Ejiri 58'; 66' (o.g.); Maslovar 78'	J. League		Attendance: 10,156; Referee: Yoshitsugu Katayama; Assistant referees: Noboru Ishiyama, Masaaki Shimomura; Fourth official: Hiroshi Abe

27 April 1996 10	JEF United Ichihara	2–1	Gamba Osaka	Yamagata Park Stadium
16:00 JST (UTC+09)	Jō 49'; Igarashi 89'	J. League	Matsunami 74'	Attendance: 13,153; Referee: Hiroshi Tanabe; Assistant referees: Toshiyuki Mayuzumi, Satoru Ishizawa; Fourth official: Masaki Abe

1 May 1996 11	Verdy Kawasaki	2–1 (V-goal) (a.e.t.)	JEF United Ichihara	Kawasaki Todoroki Stadium
19:00 JST (UTC+09)	Donizete 52'; Sugawara 100'	J. League	Sandro 84'	Attendance: 10,021; Referee: Tatsumi Ōno; Assistant referees: Kōji Taniuchi, Akihisa Makino; Fourth official: Toshiya Kumagai

4 May 1996 12	JEF United Ichihara	3–2	Kashima Antlers	Tokyo National Stadium
14:03 JST (UTC+09)	Hašek 1', 27'; Hiroyama 14'	J. League	Kurosaki 2'; Leonardo 5'	Attendance: 40,016; Referee: Kenji Tanaka; Assistant referees: Yoshikazu Hiroshima, Toshimitsu Yoshida; Fourth official: Keizō Yamazaki

11 May 1996 13	Cerezo Osaka	2–3	JEF United Ichihara	Kobe Universiade Memorial Stadium
14:00 JST (UTC+09)	Manoel 31', 59'	J. League	Jō 30'; Akiba 40'; Hašek 83'	Attendance: 5,896; Referee: Piotr Werner; Assistant referees: Akio Okutani, Hiroyuki Ōnishi; Fourth official: Kazuya Yanagisawa

15 May 1996 14	JEF United Ichihara	4–2	Yokohama Flügels	Ichihara Stadium
19:03 JST (UTC+09)	Maslovar 6'; Hašek 13', 32'; Sandro 81'	J. League	Evair 16'; Maezono 33'	Attendance: 10,042; Referee: Tōru Kamikawa; Assistant referees: Hiroshi Fukuda, Hisaharu Kitamura; Fourth official: Eiji Kawai

18 May 1996 15	Shimizu S-Pulse	1–2	JEF United Ichihara	Nihondaira Sports Stadium
16:05 JST (UTC+09)	Oliva 87'	J. League	Jō 10'; Maslovar 68'	Attendance: 13,380; Referee: Keiichi Sunakawa; Assistant referees: Tetsu Karakida, Hitoshi Nakagomi; Fourth official: Masakazu Hōjō

28 August 1996 16	Kashima Antlers	2–0	JEF United Ichihara	Kashima Soccer Stadium
18:59 JST (UTC+09)	Naitō 6'; Rodrigo 16'	J. League		Attendance: 16,046; Referee: Lim Kee Chong; Assistant referees: Satoru Ishizawa, Hitoshi Nakagomi; Fourth official: Masao Komada

31 August 1996 17	JEF United Ichihara	1–0 (V-goal) (a.e.t.)	Cerezo Osaka	Ichihara Stadium
19:03 JST (UTC+09)	Nakanishi 94'	J. League		Attendance: 7,469; Referee: Masayoshi Okada; Assistant referees: Toshiyuki Mayuzumi, Masahiro Katagiri; Fourth official: Terunobu Kakinuma

7 September 1996 18	Yokohama Flügels	2–0	JEF United Ichihara	Yokohama Mitsuzawa Football Stadium
18:34 JST (UTC+09)	Yamaguchi 27'; Yoshida 61'	J. League		Attendance: 11,103; Referee: Yasuhiro Matsuzaki; Assistant referees: Kimio Izaki, Susumu Takeda; Fourth official: Michio Nakahara

14 September 1996 19	JEF United Ichihara	0–1 (V-goal) (a.e.t.)	Shimizu S-Pulse	Akita Yabase Stadium
14:04 JST (UTC+09)		J. League	91' (o.g.)	Attendance: 7,848; Referee: Tatsumi Ōno; Assistant referees: Kenichi Koshiyama, Takao Onshi; Fourth official: Toshihisa Sugiyama

21 September 1996 20	Sanfrecce Hiroshima	3–4	JEF United Ichihara	Tottori Stadium
18:30 JST (UTC+09)	Takagi 25', 33', 66'	J. League	Jō 7'; Rufer 10', 58'; Hašek 82'	Attendance: 7,389; Referee: Yasuhiro Hemmi; Assistant referees: Yoshikazu Hiroshima, Sōichirō Kaneko; Fourth official: Tomohiro Takagaki

28 September 1996 21	JEF United Ichihara	1–0	Kyoto Purple Sanga	Ichihara Stadium
15:03 JST (UTC+09)	Hašek 62'	J. League		Attendance: 7,142; Referee: Yoshimi Ogawa; Assistant referees: Takashi Kunori, Akihisa Makino; Fourth official: Atsushi Nakamura

2 October 1996 22	Bellmare Hiratsuka	0–4	JEF United Ichihara	Hiratsuka Stadium
19:03 JST (UTC+09)		J. League	Hašek 31', 35'; Mutō 38'; Jō 40'	Attendance: 6,010; Referee: Masayoshi Okada; Assistant referees: Tetsu Karakida, Takao Onshi; Fourth official: Junichi Sasaki

5 October 1996 23	JEF United Ichihara	2–3	Kashiwa Reysol	Ichihara Stadium
15:03 JST (UTC+09)	Hašek 9'; Nakanishi 40'	J. League	Hashiratani 51'; Sakai 52', 53'	Attendance: 8,600; Referee: Tatsumi Ōno; Assistant referees: Satoru Ishizawa, Masaaki Shimomura; Fourth official: Eita Horikawa

16 October 1996 24	Avispa Fukuoka	3–2	JEF United Ichihara	Hakatanomori Football Stadium
19:01 JST (UTC+09)	Ishimaru 20'; Ueno 27'; Maradona 49'	J. League	Jō 26', 89'	Attendance: 5,309; Referee: Zoran Petrović; Assistant referees: Hiroyuki Izumi, Takuji Fukazawa; Fourth official: Ryōichi Imamura

19 October 1996 25	JEF United Ichihara	1–2	Yokohama Marinos	Tokyo National Stadium
15:02 JST (UTC+09)	Jō 60'	J. League	T. Suzuki 59'; Yasunaga 82'	Attendance: 16,902; Referee: Keiichi Sunakawa; Assistant referees: Kazuaki Hamaguchi, Kenichi Koshiyama; Fourth official: Masao Yamanaka

26 October 1996 26	Júbilo Iwata	2–1	JEF United Ichihara	Júbilo Iwata Stadium
14:01 JST (UTC+09)	Schillaci 16'; Nakayama 77'	J. League	Hašek 29'	Attendance: 12,164; Referee: Hiroyuki Umemoto; Assistant referees: Sōichirō Kaneko, Kazuhisa Osada; Fourth official: Takuya Okada

30 October 1996 27	JEF United Ichihara	1–0	Urawa Red Diamonds	Ichihara Stadium
19:04 JST (UTC+09)	Rufer 38'	J. League		Attendance: 8,337; Referee: Hideo Kikuchi; Assistant referees: Yū Nakamura, Tetsu Karakida; Fourth official: Fujirō Masukura

2 November 1996 28	Nagoya Grampus Eight	1–1 (V-goal) (a.e.t.) (4–2 p)	JEF United Ichihara	Nagoya Mizuho Athletics Stadium
15:03 JST (UTC+09)	Ōiwa 37'	J. League	Niimura 3'	Attendance: 20,679; Referee: Kiyoshi Ōta; Assistant referees: Akio Okutani, Kazuhiko Matsumura; Fourth official: Tsuyoshi Ogura
	Penalties
	(penalty scored) Durix; (penalty scored) Torres; (penalty scored) Nishigaya; (penalty scored) Iijima		(penalty scored) Rufer; (penalty scored) Hašek; (penalty missed) Ejiri; (penalty missed) Bosz

6 November 1996 29	JEF United Ichihara	1–5	Verdy Kawasaki	Ichihara Stadium
19:00 JST (UTC+09)	Rufer 61'	J. League	K. Miura 0', 11', 89'; Bismarck 36'; Magrão 84'	Attendance: 7,767; Referee: Masayoshi Okada; Assistant referees: Kō Ōishi, Takayoshi Kashino; Fourth official: Terunobu Kakinuma

9 November 1996 30	Gamba Osaka	2–1	JEF United Ichihara	Expo '70 Commemorative Stadium
14:30 JST (UTC+09)	Isogai 34'; Gillhaus 89'	J. League	Jō 35'	Attendance: 8,090; Referee: Yasuhiro Hemmi; Assistant referees: Naoyuki Mori, Masatoshi Shibata; Fourth official: Akio Okutani

=== Emperor's Cup ===
1st Round	bye

2nd Round	bye

17 November 1996 3rd Round	JEF United Ichihara	0–0 (V-goal) (a.e.t.) (4–5 p)	Fujitsu Kawasaki	Ichihara Stadium
: JST (UTC+09)

=== J.League Cup ===
1 June 1996 GL-B-1-1	JEF United Ichihara	0–1	Avispa Fukuoka	Ichihara Stadium
19:00 JST (UTC+09)		J. League	Troglio 50'	Attendance: 9,964; Referee: Tetsuya Hamana; Assistant referees: Kazuhisa Osada, Susumu Takeda; Fourth official: Masahiko Tsuma

5 June 1996 GL-B-1-2	Avispa Fukuoka	0–2 (1–2 agg.)	JEF United Ichihara	Hakatanomori Football Stadium
19:00 JST (UTC+09)		J. League	Maslovar 40'; Hiroyama 57'	Attendance: 6,227; Referee: Kenji Tanaka; Assistant referees: Hideaki Harada, Kazuhiko Matsumura; Fourth official: Daikichi Kanada

8 June 1996 GL-B-2-1	Cerezo Osaka	3–3	JEF United Ichihara	Sapporo Atsubetsu Stadium
13:02 JST (UTC+09)	Kawamae 7'; Kurata 75'; Kanda 83'	J. League	55' (o.g.), 71' (o.g.); Maslovar 69'	Attendance: 2,218; Referee: Hiroshi Tanabe; Assistant referees: Kenichi Koshiyama, Satoru Ishizawa; Fourth official: Eiji Kaneda

12 June 1996 GL-B-2-2	JEF United Ichihara	2–0 (5–2 agg.)	Cerezo Osaka	Ichihara Stadium
19:02 JST (UTC+09)	Hašek 11'; Jō 79'	J. League		Attendance: 6,042; Referee: Hideo Kikuchi; Assistant referees: Takayoshi Kashino, Takao Onshi; Fourth official: Terunobu Kakinuma

15 June 1996 GL-B-3-1	Nagoya Grampus Eight	1–1	JEF United Ichihara	Nagoya Mizuho Athletics Stadium
16:04 JST (UTC+09)	Stojković 70'	J. League	Ejiri 89'	Attendance: 21,172; Referee: Shinichirō Obata; Assistant referees: Morihisa Yamaguchi, Kōji Minami; Fourth official: Noriaki Fukunaga

19 June 1996 GL-B-3-2	JEF United Ichihara	1–0 (2–1 agg.)	Nagoya Grampus Eight	Ichihara Stadium
19:01 JST (UTC+09)	Hašek 69'	J. League		Attendance: 6,023; Referee: Archundia; Assistant referees: Tetsu Karakida, Kō Ōishi; Fourth official: Atsushi Nakamura

22 June 1996 GL-B-4-1	JEF United Ichihara	0–2	Verdy Kawasaki	Tecnoport Fukui Stadium
18:00 JST (UTC+09)		J. League	Kitazawa 23'; Bismarck 71'	Attendance: 15,515; Referee: Naotsugu Fuse; Assistant referees: Sōichirō Kaneko, Hideaki Harada; Fourth official: Kazuya Takahara

26 June 1996 GL-B-4-2	Verdy Kawasaki	1–2 (3–2 agg.)	JEF United Ichihara	Kawasaki Todoroki Stadium
19:00 JST (UTC+09)	Nunobe 37'	J. League	Jō 61'; Niimura 76'	Attendance: 6,862; Referee: Piotr Werner; Assistant referees: Mitsuru Satō, Ichirō Inukai; Fourth official: Nobuhiro Shirai

29 June 1996 GL-B-5-1	Yokohama Flügels	2–3	JEF United Ichihara	Yokohama Mitsuzawa Football Stadium
18:33 JST (UTC+09)	Hattori 20'; Yamaguchi 21'	J. League	Hašek 17', 40'; Sandro 79'	Attendance: 8,787; Referee: Zoran Petrović; Assistant referees: Kazuaki Hamaguchi, Takao Onshi; Fourth official: Michio Nakahara

3 July 1996 GL-B-5-2	JEF United Ichihara	1–5 (4–7 agg.)	Yokohama Flügels	Ichihara Stadium
19:00 JST (UTC+09)	Hašek 83'	J. League	Yamaguchi 4', 49'; Denilson 58'; Zinho 75', 84'	Attendance: 6,169; Referee: Archundia; Assistant referees: Toshimitsu Yoshida, Kō Ōishi; Fourth official: Kōji Sugikawa

10 August 1996 GL-B-6-1	Kashima Antlers	1–1	JEF United Ichihara	Kashima Soccer Stadium
18:00 JST (UTC+09)	Kurosaki 61'	J. League	Jō 49'	Attendance: 15,436; Referee: Kazuo Kakihana; Assistant referees: Kōji Taniuchi, Susumu Takeda; Fourth official: Atsushi Fujigasaki

14 August 1996 GL-B-6-2	JEF United Ichihara	1–1 (2–2 agg.)	Kashima Antlers	Ichihara Stadium
19:01 JST (UTC+09)	Hašek 21'	J. League	Mazinho 14'	Attendance: 11,635; Referee: Kiyoshi Ōta; Assistant referees: Toshiyuki Mayuzumi, Masahiro Katagiri; Fourth official: Katsuhiko Takayama

17 August 1996 GL-B-7-1	JEF United Ichihara	3–1	Shimizu S-Pulse	Ichihara Stadium
19:01 JST (UTC+09)	Nakanishi 23'; Maslovar 56'; Jō 79'	J. League	Sawanobori 74'	Attendance: 9,071; Referee: Yoshitsugu Katayama; Assistant referees: Yū Nakamura, Kazuhisa Osada; Fourth official: Masahiko Tsuma

21 August 1996 GL-B-7-2	Shimizu S-Pulse	4–0 (5–3 agg.)	JEF United Ichihara	Nihondaira Sports Stadium
18:59 JST (UTC+09)	Hasegawa 10', 38'; Oliva 49'; Morioka 83'	J. League		Attendance: 12,788; Referee: Hideo Kikuchi; Assistant referees: Sōichirō Kaneko, Kimio Izaki; Fourth official: Toshiyuki Asanuma

== Player statistics ==
Pos.	Nat.	Player	D.o.B. (Age)	Height / Weight	J.League		Emperor's Cup		J.League Cup		Total	
Pos.	Nat.	Player	D.o.B. (Age)	Height / Weight	Apps	Goals	Apps	Goals	Apps	Goals	Apps	Goals
FW	(New Zealand)	Rufer	December 29, 1962 (aged 33)	181 cm / 85 kg	10	4	0	0	2	0	12	4
MF	(Czech Republic)	Hašek	September 6, 1963 (aged 32)	171 cm / 65 kg	28	12	1	0	14	6	43	18
MF	(Japan)	Hisataka Fujikawa	May 1, 1964 (aged 31)	180 cm / 72 kg	11	0	0	0	3	0	14	0
DF	(Federal Republic of Yugoslavia)	Vasilijević	August 27, 1965 (aged 29)	180 cm / 85 kg	32	4	0	0	0	0	32	4
DF	(Japan)	Kazuya Igarashi	October 24, 1965 (aged 30)	177 cm / 70 kg	14	1	0	0	3	0	17	1
MF	(Federal Republic of Yugoslavia)	Maslovar	February 20, 1967 (aged 29)	182 cm / 77 kg	17	4	1	0	10	3	28	7
MF	(Japan)	Atsuhiko Ejiri	July 12, 1967 (aged 28)	178 cm / 70 kg	29	2	1	0	14	1	44	3
DF	(Japan)	Mikio Manaka	May 22, 1969 (aged 26)	172 cm / 70 kg	20	0	1	0	14	0	35	0
MF	(Japan)	Tarō Gotō	December 24, 1969 (aged 26)	164 cm / 62 kg	0	0	0	0	3	0	3	0
FW	(Japan)	Yasuhiko Niimura	May 11, 1970 (aged 25)	176 cm / 68 kg	21	1	1	0	6	1	28	2
GK	(Japan)	Kenichi Shimokawa	May 14, 1970 (aged 25)	188 cm / 88 kg	30	0	1	0	14	0	45	0
GK	(Japan)	Norihiro Karatani	August 17, 1970 (aged 25)	184 cm / 83 kg	0	0		0	0	0		0
MF	(Japan)	Yoshikazu Nonomura	May 8, 1972 (aged 23)	175 cm / 67 kg	18	0	1	0	13	0	32	0
DF	(Japan)	Shinichi Mutō	April 2, 1973 (aged 22)	168 cm / 60 kg	18	2	1	0	12	0	31	2
DF	(Brazil)	Sandro	May 19, 1973 (aged 22)	184 cm / 78 kg	24	2	0	0	13	1	37	3
MF	(Japan)	Eisuke Nakanishi	June 23, 1973 (aged 22)	174 cm / 73 kg	20	5	0	0	10	1	30	6
MF	(Japan)	Shūzō Machida	October 21, 1973 (aged 22)	178 cm / 69 kg	0	0		0	0	0		0
GK	(Japan)	Tomonori Tateishi	April 22, 1974 (aged 21)	183 cm / 72 kg	0	0		0	0	0		0
DF	(Japan)	Jun Mizuno	August 7, 1974 (aged 21)	173 cm / 68 kg	0	0		0	0	0		0
DF	(Japan)	Teppei Isaka	October 23, 1974 (aged 21)	184 cm / 69 kg	0	0		0	0	0		0
FW	(Japan)	Masatoshi Hara	June 16, 1975 (aged 20)	181 cm / 79 kg	0	0		0	0	0		0
FW	(Japan)	Shōji Jō	June 17, 1975 (aged 20)	179 cm / 72 kg	23	9	1	0	13	4	37	13
MF	(Japan)	Tadahiro Akiba	October 13, 1975 (aged 20)	174 cm / 67 kg	16	1	0	0	9	0	25	1
MF	(Japan)	Shinji Ōtsuka	December 29, 1975 (aged 20)	179 cm / 65 kg	5	0	0	0	2	0	7	0
GK	(Japan)	Shinobu Nagata	January 29, 1976 (aged 20)	178 cm / 72 kg	0	0		0	0	0		0
FW	(Japan)	Yoshiyuki Morisaki	April 20, 1976 (aged 19)	180 cm / 76 kg	0	0		0	1	0		0
FW	(Japan)	Kenji Kodama	May 9, 1976 (aged 19)	173 cm / 62 kg	0	0		0	0	0		0
DF	(Japan)	Kazuhiro Suzuki	November 16, 1976 (aged 19)	176 cm / 67 kg	9	0	1	0	6	0	16	0
DF	(Japan)	Takayuki Chano	November 23, 1976 (aged 19)	176 cm / 72 kg	16	0	1	0	7	0	24	0
MF	(Japan)	Nozomi Hiroyama	May 6, 1977 (aged 18)	173 cm / 63 kg	21	1	1	0	8	1	30	2
DF	(Japan)	Katsushi Kurihara	July 29, 1977 (aged 18)	175 cm / 65 kg	5	0	0	0	1	0	6	0
DF	(Japan)	Hiroshi Kawamoto	November 4, 1977 (aged 18)	177 cm / 70 kg	0	0		0	0	0		0
MF	(Japan)	Takayoshi Shikida	November 25, 1977 (aged 18)	168 cm / 60 kg	6	0	0	0	4	0	10	0
DF	(Japan)	Satoshi Yamaguchi †	April 17, 1978 (aged 17)	-cm / -kg	12	0	1	0	2	0	15	0
GK	(Japan)	Hiroyuki Nitao †	November 27, 1973 (aged 22)	181 cm / 76 kg	0	0		0	0	0		0
MF	(Netherlands)	Bosz †	November 21, 1963 (aged 32)	-cm / -kg	9	0	1	0	0	0	10	0

- † player(s) joined the team after the opening of this season.

== Transfers ==
In:

No.	Pos.	Nation	Player
—	GK	JPN	Norihiro Karatani (from NTT Kanto)
—	DF	JPN	Hiroshi Kawamoto (from Horikoshi High School)
—	DF	JPN	Katsushi Kurihara (from JEF United Ichihara youth)
—	MF	CZE	Ivan Hašek (from Sanfrecce Hiroshima)
—	MF	JPN	Takayoshi Shikida (from Funabashi Municipal High School)
—	MF	JPN	Nozomi Hiroyama (from Narashino High School)
—	MF	JPN	Shūzō Machida (from International Budo University)

Out:

No.	Pos.	Nation	Player
—	GK	JPN	Kosuke Kishimoto
—	DF	JPN	Michel Miyazawa
—	DF	JPN	Kenji Yamamoto (retired)
—	DF	JPN	Tadashi Koya (to Brummel Sendai)
—	DF	JPN	Hiroshi Miyazawa (to Bellmare Hiratsuka)
—	MF	JPN	Hideyuki Sudō (to Brummel Sendai)
—	DF	JPN	Kazuhiro Suzuki
—	MF	JPN	Yoshikazu Gotō (to Toshiba)
—	MF	JPN	Kazuo Echigo (to Brummel Sendai)
—	MF	JPN	Kōichi Usui (to Fukushima FC)
—	FW	PRK	Shin Che-Bon (to Fujitsu)
—	FW	JPN	Yūji Ozaki
—	FW	JPN	Kinya Takehara (to Fukushima FC)

== Transfers during the season ==
=== In ===
- (Japan) Hiroyuki Nitao (from Yokohama Flügels)
- (Japan) Satoshi Yamaguchi (JEF United Ichihara youth)
- (Netherlands) Peter Bosz (from Feyenoord on September)

=== Out ===
- (Federal Republic of Yugoslavia) Goran Vasilijević (to Lokomotiv Sofia on April)

== Awards ==
none

== Other pages ==
- (in Japanese) J. League official site
- (in Japanese) JEF United Ichihara Chiba official web site
