= 1995 JEF United Ichihara season =

JEF United Ichihara
1995 season
- Manager: Eijun Kiyokumo
- Stadium: Ichihara Stadium
- J.League: 5th
- Emperor's Cup: 1st Round
- Top goalscorer: League: Rufer (21); All: Rufer (22)
- Highest home attendance: 15,234 (vs Verdy Kawasaki, 23 August 1995); 52,149 (vs Urawa Red Diamonds, 6 May 1995, Tokyo National Stadium)
- Lowest home attendance: 7,449 (vs Cerezo Osaka, 1 November 1995)
- Average home league attendance: 15,418
| Home colours | Away colours |

1995 JEF United Ichihara season

== Review and events ==
=== League results summary ===
| Overall | | | | | | | | Home | | | | | | Away | | | | | |
| Pld | W | D | L | GF | GA | GD | Pts | W | D | L | GF | GA | GD | W | D | L | GF | GA | GD |
|---|---|---|---|---|---|---|---|---|---|---|---|---|---|---|---|---|---|---|---|
| 52 | 28 | 0 | 24 | 97 | 91 | +6 | 88 | 16 | 0 | 10 | 49 | 42 | +7 | 12 | 0 | 14 | 48 | 49 | −1 |

Source: J.LEAGUE OFFICIAL RECORD & DATA 1996. ISBN 4-09-102323-1.

=== League results by round ===
J.League Suntory series (first stage)
| Round | 1 | 2 | 3 | 4 | 5 | 6 | 7 | 8 | 9 | 10 | 11 | 12 | 13 | 14 | 15 | 16 | 17 | 18 | 19 | 20 | 21 | 22 | 23 | 24 | 25 | 26 |
|---|---|---|---|---|---|---|---|---|---|---|---|---|---|---|---|---|---|---|---|---|---|---|---|---|---|---|
| Ground | H | A | H | A | H | H | A | A | H | A | H | H | A | H | A | H | A | A | H | H | A | H | A | A | H | A |
| Result | W | L | L | L | W | W | W | L | W | W | L | W | L | L | W | W | W | L | W | W | L | W | L | W | L | L |
| Position | 4 | 9 | 9 | 13 | 10 | 9 | 7 | 7 | 7 | 7 | 8 | 8 | 8 | 8 | 7 | 5 | 4 | 4 | 3 | 2 | 2 | 2 | 2 | 2 | 3 | 6 |

Source: J.LEAGUE OFFICIAL RECORD & DATA 1996. ISBN 4-09-102323-1.
A = Away; H = Home; W = Win; D = Draw; L = Loss

J.League NICOS series (second stage)
| Round | 1 | 2 | 3 | 4 | 5 | 6 | 7 | 8 | 9 | 10 | 11 | 12 | 13 | 14 | 15 | 16 | 17 | 18 | 19 | 20 | 21 | 22 | 23 | 24 | 25 | 26 |
|---|---|---|---|---|---|---|---|---|---|---|---|---|---|---|---|---|---|---|---|---|---|---|---|---|---|---|
| Ground | H | H | A | H | A | H | A | A | H | H | A | H | A | A | H | A | H | A | H | H | A | A | H | A | H | A |
| Result | W | L | L | W | W | L | W | W | L | W | W | L | L | L | L | L | W | W | W | W | L | L | L | W | W | W |
| Position | 5 | 7 | 11 | 8 | 7 | 7 | 7 | 6 | 7 | 7 | 5 | 6 | 6 | 7 | 6 | 6 | 6 | 6 | 6 | 6 | 6 | 8 | 10 | 9 | 7 | 7 |

Source: J.LEAGUE OFFICIAL RECORD & DATA 1996. ISBN 4-09-102323-1.
A = Away; H = Home; W = Win; D = Draw; L = Loss

== Competitions ==
| Competitions | Position |
|---|---|
| J.League | 5th / 14 clubs |
| Emperor's Cup | 1st round |

== Domestic results ==
=== J.League ===
| 18 March 1995 1st-1 | JEF United Ichihara | 1–0 | Júbilo Iwata | Ichihara Stadium |
| 15:03 JST (UTC+09) | Vasilijević 89' | J. League | | Attendance: 13,637; Referee: Tetsuya Hamana; Assistant referees: Toshiyuki Mayuzumi, Mitsuru Satō; Fourth official: Kazuya Isokawa; Man of the Match: Vasilijević |

| 22 March 1995 1st-2 | Urawa Red Diamonds | 1–0 | JEF United Ichihara | Omiya Football Stadium |
| 19:03 JST (UTC+09) | Bein 72' | J. League | | Attendance: 9,704; Referee: Tatsumi Ōno; Assistant referees: Satoru Ishizawa, Tōru Kamikawa; Fourth official: Izumi Okada |

| 25 March 1995 1st-3 | JEF United Ichihara | 2–3 | Bellmare Hiratsuka | Ichihara Stadium |
| 15:01 JST (UTC+09) | Nakanishi 28'; Maslovar 30' | J. League | Takada 48'; Narahashi 75'; Noguchi 83' | Attendance: 11,895; Referee: Naotsugu Fuse; Assistant referees: Masahiro Katagiri, Ichirō Inukai; Fourth official: Terunobu Kakinuma |

| 29 March 1995 1st-4 | Yokohama Marinos | 3–2 (V-goal) (a.e.t.) | JEF United Ichihara | Yokohama Mitsuzawa Football Stadium |
| 19:03 JST (UTC+09) | T. Yamada 24'; M. Suzuki 78'; T. Suzuki 119' | J. League | Rufer 82', 84' | Attendance: 11,978; Referee: Hideo Kikuchi; Assistant referees: Kazuaki Hamaguchi, Takayoshi Kashino; Fourth official: Takatoshi Itō |

| 1 April 1995 1st-5 | JEF United Ichihara | 1–0 (V-goal) (a.e.t.) | Kashiwa Reysol | Ichihara Stadium |
| 15:05 JST (UTC+09) | Vasilijević 119' | J. League | | Attendance: 14,079; Referee: Yoshitsugu Katayama; Assistant referees: Noboru Ishiyama, Kō Ōishi; Fourth official: Kaoru Nagase; Man of the Match: Kenichi Shimokawa |

| 5 April 1995 1st-6 | JEF United Ichihara | 3–1 | Shimizu S-Pulse | Ichihara Stadium |
| 19:04 JST (UTC+09) | Rufer 26'; Ejiri 54'; Jō 87' | J. League | Toninho 61' | Attendance: 13,228; Referee: Armando Perez; Assistant referees: Hiroshi Fukuda, Hitoshi Yamada; Fourth official: Eita Horikawa; Man of the Match: Takayuki Chano |

| 8 April 1995 1st-7 | Sanfrecce Hiroshima | 1–2 | JEF United Ichihara | Hiroshima Big Arch |
| 15:02 JST (UTC+09) | Hašek 83' | J. League | Ejiri 1'; Rufer 7' | Attendance: 11,266; Referee: Kenji Tanaka; Assistant referees: Noboru Ishiyama, Naoki Esumi; Fourth official: Kōji Ueno; Man of the Match: Rufer |

| 12 April 1995 1st-8 | Kashima Antlers | 3–1 | JEF United Ichihara | Kashima Soccer Stadium |
| 19:01 JST (UTC+09) | Leonardo 25' (pen.); Hasegawa 27', 61' | J. League | Rufer 56' (pen.) | Attendance: 15,195; Referee: Juan Carlos Crespi; Assistant referees: Kimio Izaki, Kō Ōishi; Fourth official: Toshio Itō |

| 15 April 1995 1st-9 | JEF United Ichihara | 1–0 (V-goal) (a.e.t.) | Verdy Kawasaki | Ichihara Stadium |
| 15:04 JST (UTC+09) | Y. Gotō 99' | J. League | | Attendance: 13,512; Referee: Keiichi Sunakawa; Assistant referees: Masahiro Katagiri, Ichirō Inukai; Fourth official: Morio Okamoto; Man of the Match: Mikio Manaka |

| 22 April 1995 1st-10 | Yokohama Flügels | 0–3 | JEF United Ichihara | Kagoshima Kamoike Stadium |
| 14:02 JST (UTC+09) | | J. League | Vasilijević 42'; Nonomura 80'; Fujikawa 89' | Attendance: 10,558; Referee: Kiyoshi Ōta; Assistant referees: Tōru Yamashiro, Hiroyuki Izumi; Fourth official: Shōji Hamada; Man of the Match: Maslovar |

| 26 April 1995 1st-11 | JEF United Ichihara | 3–4 (V-goal) (a.e.t.) | Cerezo Osaka | Ichihara Stadium |
| 19:03 JST (UTC+09) | Ejiri 20'; 78' (o.g.); Rufer 80' | J. League | Marquinhos 5'; Kurata 49'; Valdés 84' 113' | Attendance: 11,757; Referee: Armando Perez; Assistant referees: Yasuhiro Matsuzaki, Kimio Izaki; Fourth official: Yoshitoshi Watanabe |

| 29 April 1995 1st-12 | JEF United Ichihara | 2–2 (V-goal) (a.e.t.) (4–3 p) | Gamba Osaka | Tecnoport Fukui Stadium |
| 14:03 JST (UTC+09) | Rufer 48'; Jō 89' | J. League | Yamaguchi 26'; Protassov 70' | Attendance: 9,495; Referee: Yōtarō Moritsu; Assistant referees: Yoshikazu Hiroshima, Yasushi Tsuchimoto; Fourth official: Masao Nakajō; Man of the Match: Atsuhiko Ejiri |
| | Penalties |
| | (penalty scored) Rufer; (penalty scored) Jō; (penalty scored) Ejiri; (penalty missed) Y. Gotō; (penalty scored) Maslovar | | (penalty scored) Morioka; (penalty scored) Yamaguchi; (penalty scored) Isogai; (penalty missed) Tsveiba; (penalty missed) Protassov |

| 3 May 1995 1st-13 | Nagoya Grampus Eight | 2–2 (V-goal) (a.e.t.) (4–3 p) | JEF United Ichihara | Gifu Nagaragawa Stadium |
| 15:03 JST (UTC+09) | Torres 4'; Hirano 21' | J. League | Maslovar 30'; Nakanishi 88' | Attendance: 20,293; Referee: Tatsumi Ōno; Assistant referees: Morihisa Yamaguchi, Mikio Fukuoka; Fourth official: Toyotaka Ogawa |
| | Penalties |
| | (penalty scored) Durix; (penalty missed) Torres; (penalty scored) Iijima; (penalty missed) Moriyama; (penalty scored) Stojković; (penalty scored) Nakanishi | | (penalty missed) Rufer; (penalty missed) Jō; (penalty scored) Ejiri; (penalty scored) Y. Gotō; (penalty scored) Maslovar; (penalty missed) M. Miyazawa |

| 6 May 1995 1st-14 | JEF United Ichihara | 0–1 | Urawa Red Diamonds | Tokyo National Stadium |
| 15:03 JST (UTC+09) | | J. League | Taguchi 89' | Attendance: 52,149; Referee: Yoshimi Ogawa; Assistant referees: Kazuaki Hamaguchi, Toshimitsu Yoshida; Fourth official: Hide Lii |

| 10 May 1995 1st-15 | Bellmare Hiratsuka | 3–4 (V-goal) (a.e.t.) | JEF United Ichihara | Hiratsuka Stadium |
| 19:01 JST (UTC+09) | Noguchi 37', 46'; Betinho 76' | J. League | Maslovar 36'; Ejiri 44', 89'; 107' (o.g.) | Attendance: 11,824; Referee: Juan Carlos Crespi; Assistant referees: Noboru Ishiyama, Hiroyuki Izumi; Fourth official: Akio Koizumi; Man of the Match: Atsuhiko Ejiri |

| 13 May 1995 1st-16 | JEF United Ichihara | 2–1 | Yokohama Marinos | Akita Yabase Stadium |
| 13:04 JST (UTC+09) | Jō 10'; Ejiri 75' | J. League | Bisconti 40' | Attendance: 15,807; Referee: Kiyoshi Ōta; Assistant referees: Hitoshi Yamada, Satoru Ishizawa; Fourth official: Atsushi Endō; Man of the Match: Tomonori Tateishi |

| 17 June 1995 1st-17 | Kashiwa Reysol | 0–3 | JEF United Ichihara | Kashiwa Hitachi Stadium |
| 19:03 JST (UTC+09) | | J. League | Rufer 0'; Ejiri 41'; Vasilijević 69' | Attendance: 13,314; Referee: Lutz Fröhlich; Assistant referees: Yū Nakamura, Toshimitsu Yoshida; Fourth official: Fujirō Masukura; Man of the Match: Mikio Manaka |

| 21 June 1995 1st-18 | Shimizu S-Pulse | 1–1 (V-goal) (a.e.t.) (6–5 p) | JEF United Ichihara | Nihondaira Sports Stadium |
| 19:03 JST (UTC+09) | Hasegawa 69' | J. League | Ejiri 75' | Attendance: 18,545; Referee: Kenji Tanaka; Assistant referees: Kazuya Yanagisawa, Mitsuyoshi Nakaguma; Fourth official: Toshiyuki Asanuma |
| | Penalties |
| | (penalty scored) Dias; (penalty missed) Ōenoki; (penalty scored) Miura; (penalty scored) Tajima; (penalty missed) T. Itō; (penalty scored) Horiike; (penalty scored) Toninho; (penalty scored) Hasegawa | | (penalty missed) Maslovar; (penalty missed) Manaka; (penalty scored) Echigo; (penalty scored) Chano; (penalty scored) Ejiri; (penalty scored) M. Miyazawa; (penalty scored) Nakanishi; (penalty missed) Niimura |

| 24 June 1995 1st-19 | JEF United Ichihara | 3–0 | Sanfrecce Hiroshima | Ichihara Stadium |
| 18:33 JST (UTC+09) | Niimura 37', 76'; Maslovar 46' | J. League | | Attendance: 14,276; Referee: Naotsugu Fuse; Assistant referees: Takeshi Ōkura, Kōji Taniuchi; Fourth official: Eiji Kawai; Man of the Match: Yasuhiko Niimura |

| 28 June 1995 1st-20 | JEF United Ichihara | 2–1 | Kashima Antlers | Ichihara Stadium |
| 19:03 JST (UTC+09) | Niimura 32'; Ejiri 51' | J. League | Santos 78' (pen.) | Attendance: 14,065; Referee: Hideo Kikuchi; Assistant referees: Hiroshi Fukuda, Takashi Kunori; Fourth official: Eita Horikawa; Man of the Match: Maslovar |

| 1 July 1995 1st-21 | Verdy Kawasaki | 2–2 (V-goal) (a.e.t.) (3–2 p) | JEF United Ichihara | Kawasaki Todoroki Stadium |
| 19:04 JST (UTC+09) | Takeda 27', 66' | J. League | Maslovar 69' (pen.), 89' | Attendance: 12,696; Referee: Juan Carlos Crespi; Assistant referees: Mitsuru Satō, Hiroyuki Izumi; Fourth official: Hiroshi Yamaguchi |
| | Penalties |
| | (penalty scored) Hashiratani; (penalty scored) Pereira; (penalty missed) Bismarck; (penalty scored) Watanabe; (penalty missed) Kitazawa | | (penalty scored) Ejiri; (penalty missed) Vasilijević; (penalty missed) Echigo; (penalty scored) M. Miyazawa; (penalty missed) Maslovar |

| 8 July 1995 1st-22 | JEF United Ichihara | 3–2 (V-goal) (a.e.t.) | Yokohama Flügels | Ichihara Stadium |
| 18:33 JST (UTC+09) | Rufer 51'; Ejiri 89'; Niimura 116' | J. League | Maeda 1'; Miura 11' | Attendance: 13,683; Referee: Tatsumi Ōno; Assistant referees: Takeshi Ōkura, Hisaharu Kitamura; Fourth official: Yoshitoshi Watanabe; Man of the Match: Yasuhiko Niimura |

| 12 July 1995 1st-23 | Cerezo Osaka | 1–0 | JEF United Ichihara | Osaka Nagai No.2 Stadium |
| 19:01 JST (UTC+09) | Minamoto 2' (pen.) | J. League | | Attendance: 9,699; Referee: Lutz Fröhlich; Assistant referees: Kimio Izaki, Kōji Minami; Fourth official: Kazuo Kakihana |

| 15 July 1995 1st-24 | Gamba Osaka | 0–5 | JEF United Ichihara | Expo '70 Commemorative Stadium |
| 19:00 JST (UTC+09) | | J. League | Niimura 43', 61', 71'; Rufer 49'; Maslovar 80' | Attendance: 17,883; Referee: Yoshitsugu Katayama; Assistant referees: Sōichirō Kaneko, Naoki Esumi; Fourth official: Akio Okutani; Man of the Match: Maslovar |

| 19 July 1995 1st-25 | JEF United Ichihara | 0–5 | Nagoya Grampus Eight | Ichihara Stadium |
| 19:03 JST (UTC+09) | | J. League | Durix 44' (pen.); Moriyama 66', 72', 74'; Okayama 79' | Attendance: 13,865; Referee: Juan Carlos Crespi; Assistant referees: Kimio Izaki, Tetsu Karakida; Fourth official: Eita Horikawa |

| 22 July 1995 1st-26 | Júbilo Iwata | 3–0 | JEF United Ichihara | Júbilo Iwata Stadium |
| 19:00 JST (UTC+09) | Nakayama 51'; Schillaci 63'; Endō 68' | J. League | | Attendance: 17,703; Referee: Naotsugu Fuse; Assistant referees: Noboru Ishiyama, Kō Ōishi; Fourth official: Toshiaki Futamata |

| 12 August 1995 2nd-1 | JEF United Ichihara | 2–1 (V-goal) (a.e.t.) | Gamba Osaka | Sapporo Atsubetsu Stadium |
| 12:00 JST (UTC+09) | Jō 54' 93' | J. League | Yamaguchi 59' | Attendance: 9,518; Referee: Hideo Kikuchi; Assistant referees: Kazuaki Hamaguchi, Tetsu Karakida; Fourth official: Eiji Kaneda; Man of the Match: Shōji Jō |

| 16 August 1995 2nd-2 | JEF United Ichihara | 2–3 | Nagoya Grampus Eight | Ichihara Stadium |
| 19:02 JST (UTC+09) | Niimura 40'; Jō 53' | J. League | Durix 21'; Ogura 22'; Nakanishi 89' | Attendance: 12,584; Referee: Keiichi Sunakawa; Assistant referees: Kenichi Koshiyama, Toshimitsu Yoshida; Fourth official: Terunobu Kakinuma |

| 19 August 1995 2nd-3 | Kashima Antlers | 5–1 | JEF United Ichihara | Kashima Soccer Stadium |
| 18:00 JST (UTC+09) | Jorginho 34' (pen.); Sōma 44'; Hasegawa 60', 62'; Kurosaki 85' | J. League | Ejiri 11' | Attendance: 15,783; Referee: Masayoshi Okada; Assistant referees: Hiroshi Fukuda, Hisaharu Kitamura; Fourth official: Atsushi Fujigasaki |

| 23 August 1995 2nd-4 | JEF United Ichihara | 3–1 | Verdy Kawasaki | Ichihara Stadium |
| 19:04 JST (UTC+09) | Niimura 51', 66'; Jō 62' | J. League | Kitazawa 24' | Attendance: 15,234; Referee: Tetsuya Hamana; Assistant referees: Yū Nakamura, Akihisa Makino; Fourth official: Fujirō Masukura; Man of the Match: Kenichi Shimokawa |

| 26 August 1995 2nd-5 | Yokohama Flügels | 0–1 | JEF United Ichihara | Yokohama Mitsuzawa Football Stadium |
| 19:01 JST (UTC+09) | | J. League | Maslovar 72' | Attendance: 12,421; Referee: Yoshimi Ogawa; Assistant referees: Kimio Izaki, Mitsuyoshi Nakaguma; Fourth official: Yoshiharu Nakamura; Man of the Match: Kazuya Igarashi |

| 2 September 1995 2nd-6 | JEF United Ichihara | 0–1 | Shimizu S-Pulse | Tokyo National Stadium |
| 19:05 JST (UTC+09) | | J. League | Dias 89' | Attendance: 35,040; Referee: Zoran Petrović; Assistant referees: Mitsuru Satō, Kazuhisa Osada; Fourth official: Tsutomu Anazawa |

| 6 September 1995 2nd-7 | Cerezo Osaka | 3–4 | JEF United Ichihara | Osaka Nagai No.2 Stadium |
| 19:05 JST (UTC+09) | Valdés 35', 60'; Inagaki 52' | J. League | Rufer 69' (pen.), 75'; Jō 85'; Y. Gotō 89' | Attendance: 8,347; Referee: Kenji Tanaka; Assistant referees: Hiroshi Tanabe, Yasuhiro Hemmi; Fourth official: Sōichirō Kaneko; Man of the Match: Yoshikazu Gotō |

| 9 September 1995 2nd-8 | Sanfrecce Hiroshima | 0–2 | JEF United Ichihara | Hiroshima Big Arch |
| 19:03 JST (UTC+09) | | J. League | Maslovar 60'; Niimura 70' | Attendance: 11,227; Referee: Yoshimi Ogawa; Assistant referees: Sōichirō Kaneko, Tōru Yamashiro; Fourth official: Mamoru Ueda; Man of the Match: Maslovar |

| 13 September 1995 2nd-9 | JEF United Ichihara | 1–3 | Kashiwa Reysol | Ichihara Stadium |
| 19:02 JST (UTC+09) | T. Gotō 80' | J. League | Tanada 8', 53'; Careca 67' | Attendance: 10,439; Referee: Tatsumi Ōno; Assistant referees: Kimio Izaki, Ichirō Inukai; Fourth official: Eiji Kawai |

| 16 September 1995 2nd-10 | JEF United Ichihara | 1–0 (V-goal) (a.e.t.) | Urawa Red Diamonds | Niigata Stadium |
| 19:03 JST (UTC+09) | Jō 116' | J. League | | Attendance: 14,543; Referee: Hideo Kikuchi; Assistant referees: Masahiro Katagiri, Sōichirō Kaneko; Fourth official: Masaaki Shimomura; Man of the Match: Shōji Jō |

| 23 September 1995 2nd-11 | Bellmare Hiratsuka | 2–2 (V-goal) (a.e.t.) (4–5 p) | JEF United Ichihara | Hiratsuka Stadium |
| 15:03 JST (UTC+09) | Betinho 73'; Noguchi 82' | J. League | Maslovar 75'; Jō 87' | Attendance: 12,062; Referee: Yoshitsugu Katayama; Assistant referees: Hitoshi Yamada, Akihisa Makino; Fourth official: Tasuku Onodera; Man of the Match: Kenichi Shimokawa |
| | Penalties |
| | (penalty scored) Betinho; (penalty scored) Noguchi; (penalty missed) Simão; (penalty scored) Takada; (penalty scored) Watanabe; (penalty missed) Natsuka | | (penalty scored) Jō; (penalty missed) Vasilijević; (penalty scored) Manaka; (penalty scored) Shimokawa; (penalty scored) Maslovar; (penalty scored) T. Gotō |

| 27 September 1995 2nd-12 | JEF United Ichihara | 1–2 | Yokohama Marinos | Tokyo National Stadium |
| 19:03 JST (UTC+09) | Y. Gotō 62' | J. League | Medina Bello 21', 73' | Attendance: 28,802; Referee: Yoshimi Ogawa; Assistant referees: Hiroshi Fukuda, Satoru Ishizawa; Fourth official: Noritake Sakurada |

| 30 September 1995 2nd-13 | Júbilo Iwata | 3–0 | JEF United Ichihara | Tokyo National Stadium |
| 15:00 JST (UTC+09) | Nakayama 30', 63'; Fujita 85' | J. League | | Attendance: 31,774; Referee: Yasuhiro Matsuzaki; Assistant referees: Hiroshi Tanabe, Ichirō Inukai; Fourth official: Hide Lii |

| 4 October 1995 2nd-14 | Nagoya Grampus Eight | 5–0 | JEF United Ichihara | Nagoya Mizuho Athletics Stadium |
| 19:00 JST (UTC+09) | Ogura 18', 83'; Stojković 67', 72'; Hirayama 81' | J. League | | Attendance: 21,174; Referee: Hiroyuki Umemoto; Assistant referees: Yoshikazu Hiroshima, Takuji Fukazawa; Fourth official: Hisao Sugata |

| 7 October 1995 2nd-15 | JEF United Ichihara | 0–0 (V-goal) (a.e.t.) (2–4 p) | Kashima Antlers | Ichihara Stadium |
| 15:03 JST (UTC+09) | | J. League | | Attendance: 13,032; Referee: Yasuhiro Matsuzaki; Assistant referees: Tetsu Karakida, Hisaharu Kitamura; Fourth official: Fujirō Masukura |
| | Penalties |
| | (penalty scored) Jō; (penalty missed) Ejiri; (penalty missed) Y. Gotō; (penalty scored) Shimokawa | | (penalty scored) Manaka; (penalty missed) Akita; (penalty scored) Honda; (penalty scored) Ōno; (penalty scored) Masuda |

| 14 October 1995 2nd-16 | Verdy Kawasaki | 2–0 | JEF United Ichihara | Kawasaki Todoroki Stadium |
| 13:03 JST (UTC+09) | Takeda 59'; Kitazawa 71' | J. League | | Attendance: 17,724; Referee: Masayoshi Okada; Assistant referees: Hiroshi Fukuda, Mikio Fukuoka; Fourth official: Kanichi Takahashi |

| 18 October 1995 2nd-17 | JEF United Ichihara | 6–3 | Yokohama Flügels | Ichihara Stadium |
| 19:03 JST (UTC+09) | Maslovar 24' (pen.), 58'; Nakanishi 72'; Rufer 74', 89', 89' | J. League | Zinho 28'; Evair 31', 40' | Attendance: 8,451; Referee: Armando Perez; Assistant referees: Kazuhisa Osada, Akihisa Makino; Fourth official: Morio Okamoto; Man of the Match: Nenad Maslovar |

| 21 October 1995 2nd-18 | Shimizu S-Pulse | 1–3 | JEF United Ichihara | Ishikawa Kanazawa Stadium |
| 16:02 JST (UTC+09) | Marco 71' | J. League | Rufer 50'; Mutō 55'; Nakanishi 88' | Attendance: 12,611; Referee: Kiyoshi Ōta; Assistant referees: Takashi Kunori, Kōji Taniuchi; Fourth official: Tsutomu Kaji; Man of the Match: Rufer |

| 1 November 1995 2nd-19 | JEF United Ichihara | 3–2 (V-goal) (a.e.t.) | Cerezo Osaka | Ichihara Stadium |
| 19:03 JST (UTC+09) | Rufer 29'; Jō 46'; Nakanishi 107' | J. League | Minamoto 27'; Kawamae 50' | Attendance: 7,449; Referee: Yasuhiro Matsuzaki; Assistant referees: Hiroshi Fukuda, Toshiyuki Mayuzumi; Fourth official: Yoshitoshi Watanabe; Man of the Match: Eisuke Nakanishi |

| 4 November 1995 2nd-20 | JEF United Ichihara | 4–2 | Sanfrecce Hiroshima | Ichihara Stadium |
| 15:03 JST (UTC+09) | Rufer 2', 29', 65'; Maslovar 41' | J. League | Uemura 58'; Noh 76' | Attendance: 14,624; Referee: Hideo Kikuchi; Assistant referees: Mitsuru Satō, Akihisa Makino; Fourth official: Katsuhiko Takayama; Man of the Match: Rufer |

| 8 November 1995 2nd-21 | Kashiwa Reysol | 4–3 (V-goal) (a.e.t.) | JEF United Ichihara | Kashiwa Hitachi Stadium |
| 19:04 JST (UTC+09) | Nelsinho 21', 44'; Valdir 61'; Caio 98' | J. League | Y. Gotō 17'; Maslovar 27'; Jō 89' | Attendance: 11,044; Referee: Zoran Petrović; Assistant referees: Hitoshi Yamada, Satoru Ishizawa; Fourth official: Eiji Kawai |

| 11 November 1995 2nd-22 | Urawa Red Diamonds | 2–1 | JEF United Ichihara | Urawa Komaba Stadium |
| 15:06 JST (UTC+09) | Fukuda 79'; Bein 86' | J. League | Ejiri 28' | Attendance: 19,433; Referee: Yasuhiro Matsuzaki; Assistant referees: Hiroshi Fukuda, Naoki Esumi; Fourth official: Toshimitsu Yasumoto |

| 15 November 1995 2nd-23 | JEF United Ichihara | 2–4 | Bellmare Hiratsuka | Ichihara Stadium |
| 19:03 JST (UTC+09) | Ejiri 34'; Rufer 89' | J. League | Betinho 4', 33', 55'; Júnior 63' | Attendance: 7,928; Referee: Armando Perez; Assistant referees: Masahiro Katagiri, Toshimitsu Yoshida; Fourth official: Kōji Sugikawa |

| 18 November 1995 2nd-24 | Yokohama Marinos | 1–5 | JEF United Ichihara | Yokohama Mitsuzawa Football Stadium |
| 15:03 JST (UTC+09) | Ueno 33' | J. League | Y. Gotō 51'; Maslovar 54', 85'; Akiba 63'; Jō 89' | Attendance: 11,926; Referee: Zoran Petrović; Assistant referees: Kimio Izaki, Takuji Fukazawa; Fourth official: Takeshi Ōgiya; Man of the Match: Tadahiro Akiba |

| 22 November 1995 2nd-25 | JEF United Ichihara | 1–0 | Júbilo Iwata | Ichihara Stadium |
| 19:03 JST (UTC+09) | Jō 80' | J. League | | Attendance: 11,787; Referee: Kenji Tanaka; Assistant referees: Yū Nakamura, Tōru Kamikawa; Fourth official: Fujirō Masukura; Man of the Match: Shōji Jō |

| 25 November 1995 2nd-26 | Gamba Osaka | 1–1 (V-goal) (a.e.t.) (4–5 p) | JEF United Ichihara | Expo '70 Commemorative Stadium |
| 15:00 JST (UTC+09) | Kondō 38' | J. League | Y. Gotō 48' | Attendance: 9,864; Referee: Zoran Petrović; Assistant referees: Yoshikazu Hiroshima, Akio Okutani; Fourth official: Tsuyoshi Miyake; Man of the Match: Sandro |
| | Penalties |
| | (penalty scored) Y. Matsuyama; (penalty missed) Yamaguchi; (penalty missed) Gillhaus; (penalty scored) Miyamoto; (penalty scored) Morioka; (penalty missed) Hiraoka; (penalty scored) Hashimoto; (penalty missed) Kondō | | (penalty missed) Ejiri; (penalty scored) Mutō; (penalty scored) Maslovar; (penalty scored) Akiba; (penalty missed) Manaka; (penalty missed) Shimokawa; (penalty scored) Sandro; (penalty scored) T. Gotō |

=== Emperor's Cup ===
| 3 December 1995 1st Round | Brummell Sendai | 2–1 | JEF United Ichihara | Akita Yabase Stadium |
| : JST (UTC+09) | Edmar ?', ?' | | Rufer ?' |

== Player statistics ==
| Pos. | Nat. | Player | D.o.B. (Age) | Height / Weight | J.League | | Emperor's Cup | | Total | |
| Pos. | Nat. | Player | D.o.B. (Age) | Height / Weight | Apps | Goals | Apps | Goals | Apps | Goals |
|---|---|---|---|---|---|---|---|---|---|---|
| FW | (New Zealand) | Wynton Rufer | December 29, 1962 (aged 32) | 181 cm / 80 kg | 39 | 21 | 1 | 1 | 40 | 22 |
| DF | (Japan) | Michel Miyazawa | July 14, 1963 (aged 31) | 176 cm / 68 kg | 11 | 0 | 0 | 0 | 11 | 0 |
| MF | (Japan) | Yoshikazu Gotō | February 20, 1964 (aged 31) | 170 cm / 65 kg | 48 | 6 | 1 | 0 | 49 | 6 |
| DF | (Japan) | Hisataka Fujikawa | May 1, 1964 (aged 30) | 180 cm / 75 kg | 15 | 1 | 0 | 0 | 15 | 1 |
| DF | (Federal Republic of Yugoslavia) | Goran Vasilijević | August 27, 1965 (aged 29) | 181 cm / 81 kg | 32 | 4 | 0 | 0 | 32 | 4 |
| DF | (Japan) | Kenji Yamamoto | August 28, 1965 (aged 29) | 161 cm / 58 kg | 20 | 0 | 0 | 0 | 20 | 0 |
| DF | (Japan) | Kazuya Igarashi | October 24, 1965 (aged 29) | 177 cm / 71 kg | 19 | 0 | 0 | 0 | 19 | 0 |
| MF | (Japan) | Kazuo Echigo | December 28, 1965 (aged 29) | 171 cm / 66 kg | 11 | 0 | 0 | 0 | 11 | 0 |
| MF | (Federal Republic of Yugoslavia) | Nenad Maslovar | February 20, 1967 (aged 28) | 183 cm / 74 kg | 52 | 16 | 1 | 0 | 53 | 16 |
| MF | (Japan) | Atsuhiko Ejiri | July 12, 1967 (aged 27) | 177 cm / 68 kg | 43 | 13 | 1 | 0 | 44 | 13 |
| GK | (Japan) | Kōsuke Kishimoto | October 13, 1967 (aged 27) | 186 cm / 79 kg | 0 | 0 | | | | |
| DF | (Japan) | Mikio Manaka | May 22, 1969 (aged 25) | 171 cm / 70 kg | 48 | 0 | 1 | 0 | 49 | 0 |
| FW | (Japan) | Yasuhiko Niimura | May 11, 1970 (aged 24) | 175 cm / 68 kg | 27 | 11 | 0 | 0 | 27 | 11 |
| GK | (Japan) | Kenichi Shimokawa | May 14, 1970 (aged 24) | 187 cm / 88 kg | 44 | 0 | 1 | 0 | 45 | 0 |
| DF | (Japan) | Tadashi Koya | May 24, 1970 (aged 24) | 173 cm / 70 kg | 0 | 0 | | | | |
| DF | (Japan) | Hiroshi Miyazawa | November 22, 1970 (aged 24) | 183 cm / 80 kg | 1 | 0 | 0 | 0 | 1 | 0 |
| FW | (North Korea) | Shin Je-Bon | September 27, 1971 (aged 23) | 176 cm / 70 kg | 3 | 0 | 0 | 0 | 3 | 0 |
| MF | (Japan) | Yoshikazu Nonomura | May 8, 1972 (aged 22) | 176 cm / 68 kg | 15 | 1 | 1 | 0 | 16 | 1 |
| FW | (Japan) | Yūji Ozaki | June 30, 1972 (aged 22) | 181 cm / 76 kg | 0 | 0 | | | | |
| DF | (Japan) | Kōichi Usui | July 30, 1972 (aged 22) | 180 cm / 70 kg | 0 | 0 | | | | |
| MF | (Japan) | Shinichi Mutō | April 2, 1973 (aged 21) | 168 cm / 58 kg | 14 | 1 | 1 | 0 | 15 | 1 |
| DF | (Brazil) | Sandro | May 19, 1973 (aged 21) | 186 cm / 75 kg | 32 | 0 | 1 | 0 | 33 | 0 |
| DF | (Japan) | Eisuke Nakanishi | June 23, 1973 (aged 21) | 173 cm / 68 kg | 31 | 5 | 1 | 0 | 32 | 5 |
| DF | (Japan) | Hideyuki Sudō | April 5, 1974 (aged 20) | 171 cm / 67 kg | 0 | 0 | | | | |
| GK | (Japan) | Tomonori Tateishi | April 22, 1974 (aged 20) | 181 cm / 72 kg | 10 | 0 | 0 | 0 | 10 | 0 |
| DF | (Japan) | Jun Mizuno | August 7, 1974 (aged 20) | 173 cm / 66 kg | 3 | 0 | 0 | 0 | 3 | 0 |
| DF | (Japan) | Teppei Isaka | October 23, 1974 (aged 20) | 182 cm / 72 kg | 0 | 0 | | | | |
| MF/FW | (Japan) | Kinya Takehara | November 16, 1974 (aged 20) | 172 cm / 62 kg | 1 | 0 | 0 | 0 | 1 | 0 |
| FW | (Japan) | Masatoshi Hara | June 16, 1975 (aged 19) | 181 cm / 77 kg | 0 | 0 | | | | |
| FW | (Japan) | Shōji Jō | June 17, 1975 (aged 19) | 178 cm / 72 kg | 43 | 14 | 0 | 0 | 43 | 14 |
| DF | (Japan) | Tadahiro Akiba | October 13, 1975 (aged 19) | 173 cm / 65 kg | 37 | 1 | 1 | 0 | 38 | 1 |
| MF | (Japan) | Shinji Ōtsuka | December 29, 1975 (aged 19) | 180 cm / 67 kg | 0 | 0 | | | | |
| GK | (Japan) | Shinobu Nagata | January 29, 1976 (aged 19) | 179 cm / 70 kg | 0 | 0 | | | | |
| FW | (Japan) | Yoshiyuki Morisaki | April 20, 1976 (aged 18) | 180 cm / 75 kg | 0 | 0 | | | | |
| FW | (Japan) | Kenji Kodama | May 9, 1976 (aged 18) | 173 cm / 61 kg | 0 | 0 | | | | |
| DF | (Japan) | Kazuhiro Suzuki | November 16, 1976 (aged 18) | 176 cm / 66 kg | 33 | 0 | 1 | 0 | 34 | 0 |
| DF/MF | (Japan) | Takayuki Chano | November 23, 1976 (aged 18) | 177 cm / 75 kg | 26 | 0 | 0 | 0 | 26 | 0 |
| MF | (Japan) | Tarō Gotō † | December 24, 1969 (aged 25) | 164 cm / 62 kg | 12 | 1 | 1 | 0 | 13 | 1 |

- † player(s) joined the team after the opening of this season.

== Transfers ==
In:

| No. | Pos. | Nation | Player |
|---|---|---|---|
| — | GK | JPN | Kōsuke Kishimoto (from Fujitsu) |
| — | DF | JPN | Hisataka Fujikawa (from Nagoya Grampus Eight) |
| — | DF | YUG | Goran Vasilijević (from Lokomotiv Sofia) |
| — | DF | JPN | Kōichi Usui (from Komazawa University) |
| — | DF | JPN | Kazuhiro Suzuki (from Funabashi municipal High School) |
| — | DF | JPN | Takayuki Chano (from Funabashi municipal High School) |
| — | MF | JPN | Yoshikazu Nonomura (from Keio University) |
| — | FW | NZL | Wynton Rufer (from SV Werder Bremen) |
| — | FW | JPN | Yūji Ozaki (from Chuo University) |
| — | FW | JPN | Yoshiyuki Morisaki (from Funabashi municipal High School) |
| — | FW | JPN | Kenji Kodama (from Miyazaki Kogyo High School) |

Out:

| No. | Pos. | Nation | Player |
|---|---|---|---|
| — | GK | JPN | Masahiro Ōta (to Urawa Red Diamonds) |
| — | DF | JPN | Masanaga Kageyama (to Urawa Red Diamonds) |
| — | DF | JPN | Yūji Sakakura (to Nagoya Grampus Eight) |
| — | DF | JPN | Hidetatsu Satō |
| — | DF | JPN | Hideo Suzuki |
| — | MF | JPN | Tōru Yoshida (to Brummel Sendai) |
| — | MF | CZE | Franta (to Ventforet Kofu) |
| — | MF | JPN | Masanori Kizawa (to Cerezo Osaka) |
| — | MF | JPN | Shigeyuki Satō |
| — | MF | JPN | Shū Yashiro |
| — | FW | CZE | Pavel Řehák (to Toshiba) |
| — | FW | GER | Frank Ordenewitz |
| — | FW | JPN | Munetada Hosaka |
| — | FW | JPN | Hiroyuki Maeda |

== Transfers during the season ==
=== In ===
- (Japan) Tarō Gotō (from Nagoya Grampus Eight)

== Awards ==
none

== Other pages ==
- (in Japanese) J. League official site
- (in Japanese) JEF United Ichihara Chiba official web site
