= 1994 JEF United Ichihara season =

JEF United Ichihara
1994 season
- Manager: Eijun Kiyokumo
- Stadium: Ichihara Stadium
- J.League: 9th
- Emperor's Cup: 2nd Round
- J.League Cup: Quarterfinals
- Top goalscorer: League: Ordenewitz (30); All: Ordenewitz (32)
- Highest home attendance: 14,975 (vs Verdy Kawasaki, 29 October 1994); 52,612 (vs Kashima Antlers, 26 March 1994, Tokyo National Stadium)
- Lowest home attendance: 9,597 (vs Júbilo Iwata, 13 April 1994)
- Average home league attendance: 19,778
Home colours	Away colours

1994 JEF United Ichihara season

== Review and events ==
=== League results summary ===
Overall								Home						Away					
Pld	W	D	L	GF	GA	GD	Pts	W	D	L	GF	GA	GD	W	D	L	GF	GA	GD
44	19	0	25	69	85	−16	57	9	0	13	40	42	−2	10	0	12	29	43	−14

Source: J.LEAGUE OFFICIAL 1995 RECORD & DATA. ISBN 4-09-102317-7.

=== League results by round ===
J.League Suntory series (first stage)
Round	1	2	3	4	5	6	7	8	9	10	11	12	13	14	15	16	17	18	19	20	21	22
Ground	H	A	H	A	H	A	H	A	H	H	A	H	A	H	A	H	A	H	A	A	H	A
Result	W	L	W	W	L	L	W	L	L	L	W	W	W	L	W	L	W	L	W	L	L	L
Position	1	6	5	4	5	6	6	6	7	8	6	6	6	6	6	6	6	7	6	6	6	6

Source: J.LEAGUE OFFICIAL 1995 RECORD & DATA. ISBN 4-09-102317-7.
A = Away; H = Home; W = Win; D = Draw; L = Loss

J.League NICOS series (second stage)
Round	1	2	3	4	5	6	7	8	9	10	11	12	13	14	15	16	17	18	19	20	21	22
Ground	H	A	H	A	H	A	H	A	H	H	A	H	A	H	A	H	A	H	A	A	H	A
Result	W	W	L	L	L	L	L	W	W	L	L	L	L	W	W	L	L	W	L	L	W	W
Position	2	2	3	4	7	10	11	11	7	9	9	10	11	9	9	10	11	10	11	11	10	9

Source: J.LEAGUE OFFICIAL 1995 RECORD & DATA. ISBN 4-09-102317-7.
A = Away; H = Home; W = Win; D = Draw; L = Loss

== Competitions ==
Competitions	Position
J.League	9th / 12 clubs
Emperor's Cup	2nd round
J.League Cup	Quarterfinals

== Domestic results ==
=== J.League ===
==== Suntory series ====
12 March 1994 1st-1	JEF United Ichihara	5–1	Gamba Osaka	Ichihara Stadium
15:00 JST (UTC+09)	Jō 24'; Otze 32', 77'; Igarashi 75'; Echigo 80'	J. League	Yamaguchi 88'	Attendance: 10,044; Referee: Bengt Borjesson; Assistant referees: Hiroshi Fukuda, Naotsugu Fuse; Fourth official: Takashi Ishiwatari; Man of the Match: Otze

16 March 1994 1st-2	Yokohama Flügels	4–1	JEF United Ichihara	Yokohama Mitsuzawa Football Stadium
19:04 JST (UTC+09)	Amarilla 1'; Ōtake 22'; Edu 47'; Maezono 61'	J. League	Jō 79'	Attendance: 13,028; Referee: Zoran Petrović; Assistant referees: Noboru Ishiyama, Keiichi Sunakawa; Fourth official: Jōji Kashihara

19 March 1994 1st-3	JEF United Ichihara	3–2	Urawa Red Diamonds	Ichihara Stadium
15:01 JST (UTC+09)	Littbarski 22'; Jō 87'; Echigo 89'	J. League	Mizuuchi 28'; Hori 69'	Attendance: 9,837; Referee: Tetsuya Hamana; Assistant referees: Mitsuru Satō, Kazuhisa Osada; Fourth official: Yoshihiko Nishimaki; Man of the Match: Shōji Jō

23 March 1994 1st-4	Bellmare Hiratsuka	2–3	JEF United Ichihara	Hiratsuka Stadium
19:03 JST (UTC+09)	Noguchi 48'; Betinho 85'	J. League	Otze 11'; Jō 13', 24'	Attendance: 10,797; Referee: Hideo Kikuchi; Assistant referees: Takashi Kunori, Tetsu Karakida; Fourth official: Kazuhiko Uchida; Man of the Match: Shōji Jō

26 March 1994 1st-5	JEF United Ichihara	2–3 (V-goal) (a.e.t.)	Kashima Antlers	Tokyo National Stadium
15:03 JST (UTC+09)	Otze 4', 89'	J. League	Kurosaki 7' 95'; Alcindo 60'	Attendance: 52,612; Referee: Kiyoshi Ōta; Assistant referees: Takeshi Ōkura, Hiroshi Fukuda; Fourth official: Kōji Kunō

2 April 1994 1st-6	Verdy Kawasaki	3–0	JEF United Ichihara	Hakatanomori Athletic Stadium
15:01 JST (UTC+09)	Takeda 22', 43'; Miura 42'	J. League		Attendance: 27,475; Referee: Hiroyuki Umemoto; Assistant referees: Kazuya Yanagisawa, Hideaki Harada; Fourth official: Hiroyuki Izumi

6 April 1994 1st-7	JEF United Ichihara	3–2 (V-goal) (a.e.t.)	Yokohama Marinos	Tokyo National Stadium
19:02 JST (UTC+09)	Echigo 18'; M. Miyazawa 74'; Otze 96' (pen.)	J. League	Miura 44'; Mizunuma 82'	Attendance: 51,291; Referee: Kōetsu Kikuchi; Assistant referees: Hitoshi Yamada, Tetsu Karakida; Fourth official: Katsuhiko Takayama; Man of the Match: Kazuo Echigo

9 April 1994 1st-8	Shimizu S-Pulse	3–0	JEF United Ichihara	Ehime Matsuyama Athletic Stadium
14:00 JST (UTC+09)	Nagashima 8'; Toninho 50', 83'	J. League		Attendance: 15,198; Referee: Yōtarō Moritsu; Assistant referees: Mitsuo Kadota, Satoru Kawano; Fourth official: Tatsuya Hyōdō

13 April 1994 1st-9	JEF United Ichihara	0–2	Júbilo Iwata	Ichihara Stadium
19:03 JST (UTC+09)		J. League	Vanenburg 26'; Nakayama 80' (pen.)	Attendance: 9,597; Referee: Kiyoshi Ōta; Assistant referees: Yū Nakamura, Takashi Kunori; Fourth official: Fujirō Masukura

16 April 1994 1st-10	JEF United Ichihara	1–3	Sanfrecce Hiroshima	Tecnoport Fukui Stadium
14:00 JST (UTC+09)	Otze 89'	J. League	Takagi 68', 70'; Černý 85'	Attendance: 14,846; Referee: Shizuo Takada; Assistant referees: Takeshi Ōkura, Kōji Taniuchi; Fourth official: Kazuya Takahara

23 April 1994 1st-11	Nagoya Grampus Eight	0–1	JEF United Ichihara	Nagoya Mizuho Football Stadium
15:03 JST (UTC+09)		J. League	Kizawa 22'	Attendance: 11,716; Referee: Kōetsu Kikuchi; Assistant referees: Keiichi Sunakawa, Mikio Fukuoka; Fourth official: Noriaki Fukunaga; Man of the Match: Kazuo Echigo

27 April 1994 1st-12	JEF United Ichihara	2–1 (V-goal) (a.e.t.)	Yokohama Flügels	Ichihara Stadium
19:02 JST (UTC+09)	Otze 67'; Igarashi 104'	J. League	Maezono 52'	Attendance: 9,734; Referee: Tatsumi Ōno; Assistant referees: Takashi Kunori, Kazuhisa Osada; Fourth official: Terunobu Kakinuma; Man of the Match: Mikio Manaka

30 April 1994 1st-13	Urawa Red Diamonds	0–2	JEF United Ichihara	Urawa Komaba Stadium
15:01 JST (UTC+09)		J. League	Otze 72'; Jō 87'	Attendance: 9,393; Referee: Kiyoshi Ōta; Assistant referees: Toshiyuki Mayuzumi, Masahiro Katagiri; Fourth official: Akio Hayashi; Man of the Match: Otze

4 May 1994 1st-14	JEF United Ichihara	1–2	Bellmare Hiratsuka	Ichihara Stadium
19:02 JST (UTC+09)	Otze 31' (pen.)	J. League	Edson 52'; Noguchi 86'	Attendance: 9,826; Referee: Shizuo Takada; Assistant referees: Kazuaki Hamaguchi, Takashi Kunori; Fourth official: Atsushi Nakamura

7 May 1994 1st-15	Kashima Antlers	1–2	JEF United Ichihara	Kashima Soccer Stadium
18:30 JST (UTC+09)	Hasegawa 50'	J. League	Otze 56', 63' (pen.)	Attendance: 15,843; Referee: Tetsuya Hamana; Assistant referees: Masahiro Katagiri, Masato Nogami; Fourth official: Ichirō Inukai; Man of the Match: Otze

14 May 1994 1st-16	JEF United Ichihara	0–1 (V-goal) (a.e.t.)	Verdy Kawasaki	Tokyo National Stadium
19:05 JST (UTC+09)		J. League	Miura 94'	Attendance: 52,228; Referee: Kiyoshi Ōta; Assistant referees: Takeshi Ōkura, Tetsu Karakida; Fourth official: Kaoru Nagase

18 May 1994 1st-17	Yokohama Marinos	1–2 (V-goal) (a.e.t.)	JEF United Ichihara	Hakatanomori Athletic Stadium
19:03 JST (UTC+09)	Díaz 38'	J. League	Otze 25'; Echigo 103'	Attendance: 25,488; Referee: Hiroyuki Umemoto; Assistant referees: Hideaki Harada, Tōru Yamashiro; Fourth official: Hiroyuki Izumi; Man of the Match: Kazuo Echigo

1 June 1994 1st-18	JEF United Ichihara	1–2 (V-goal) (a.e.t.)	Shimizu S-Pulse	Tokyo National Stadium
19:03 JST (UTC+09)	Jō 17'	J. League	Toninho 86'; Iwashita 108'	Attendance: 54,656; Referee: Kenji Tanaka; Assistant referees: Kazuaki Hamaguchi, Kimio Izaki; Fourth official: Morio Okamoto

4 June 1994 1st-19	Júbilo Iwata	2–3	JEF United Ichihara	Júbilo Iwata Stadium
19:00 JST (UTC+09)	Fujita 48', 78'	J. League	Otze 56', 83' (pen.); Jō 60'	Attendance: 14,764; Referee: Shinichirō Obata; Assistant referees: Yasuhiro Matsuzaki, Mikio Fukuoka; Fourth official: Takuya Okada; Man of the Match: Kenichi Shimokawa

8 June 1994 1st-20	Sanfrecce Hiroshima	4–2	JEF United Ichihara	Hiroshima Stadium
19:04 JST (UTC+09)	Hašek 53'; Yanagimoto 67'; Takagi 73'; Moriyasu 85'	J. League	Echigo 72', 89'	Attendance: 13,054; Referee: Kōetsu Kikuchi; Assistant referees: Mitsuo Kadota, Kazunori Ōtoshi; Fourth official: Katsuya Motoyasu

11 June 1994 1st-21	JEF United Ichihara	0–1	Nagoya Grampus Eight	Ichihara Stadium
18:31 JST (UTC+09)		J. League	Jorginho 64'	Attendance: 10,516; Referee: Zoran Petrović; Assistant referees: Takashi Kunori, Kimio Izaki; Fourth official: Tatsuya Sakata

15 June 1994 1st-22	Gamba Osaka	3–0	JEF United Ichihara	Expo '70 Commemorative Stadium
19:00 JST (UTC+09)	Shimada 48'; Protassov 65'; Aleinikov 74'	J. League		Attendance: 21,440; Referee: Kōetsu Kikuchi; Assistant referees: Morihisa Yamaguchi, Yasuhiro Hemmi; Fourth official: Sōichirō Kaneko

==== NICOS series ====
10 August 1994 2nd-1	JEF United Ichihara	5–2	Gamba Osaka	Ichihara Stadium
19:02 JST (UTC+09)	Ordenewitz 20', 35', 67'; Jō 57'; Maslovar 70'	J. League	Yamaguchi 5', 71'	Attendance: 10,563; Referee: Tatsumi Ōno; Assistant referees: Toshiyuki Mayuzumi, Masahiro Katagiri; Fourth official: Misao Kataoka; Man of the Match: Ordenewitz

13 August 1994 2nd-2	Yokohama Flügels	1–2	JEF United Ichihara	Nagasaki Stadium
18:34 JST (UTC+09)	Maezono 55'	J. League	Gotō 6'; Ordenewitz 47'	Attendance: 14,702; Referee: Zoran Petrović; Assistant referees: Hiroshi Fukuda, Tōru Yamashiro; Fourth official: Tsutomu Iya; Man of the Match: Yoshikazu Gotō

17 August 1994 2nd-3	JEF United Ichihara	3–4	Urawa Red Diamonds	Ichihara Stadium
19:02 JST (UTC+09)	Maslovar 17'; Jō 61'; Echigo 85'	J. League	Rummenigge 29', 58'; Y. Satō 63', 87'	Attendance: 10,502; Referee: Kiichirō Tachi; Assistant referees: Yū Nakamura, Toshiyuki Mayuzumi; Fourth official: Yoshitoshi Watanabe

20 August 1994 2nd-4	Bellmare Hiratsuka	3–1	JEF United Ichihara	Hiratsuka Stadium
18:33 JST (UTC+09)	Noguchi 46'; T. Iwamoto 64'; Ōmoto 73'	J. League	Jō 8'	Attendance: 15,334; Referee: Tatsumi Ōno; Assistant referees: Takashi Kunori, Kazuhisa Osada; Fourth official: Junichi Sasaki

27 August 1994 2nd-5	JEF United Ichihara	1–4	Kashima Antlers	Tochigi Utsunomiya Green Stadium
18:00 JST (UTC+09)	Ordenewitz 89' (pen.)	J. League	Alcindo 4'; Leonardo 23', 70'; Hasegawa 41'	Attendance: 18,023; Referee: Masahiro Sogawa; Assistant referees: Yū Nakamura, Satoru Ishizawa; Fourth official: Hiroshi Tezuka

31 August 1994 2nd-6	Verdy Kawasaki	3–1	JEF United Ichihara	Kawasaki Todoroki Stadium
19:02 JST (UTC+09)	Takeda 18', 85'; Bentinho 39'	J. League	Ordenewitz 43'	Attendance: 10,617; Referee: Yōtarō Moritsu; Assistant referees: Takashi Kunori, Masahiro Katagiri; Fourth official: Hideaki Ishii

3 September 1994 2nd-7	JEF United Ichihara	2–3	Yokohama Marinos	Tokyo National Stadium
18:32 JST (UTC+09)	Ordenewitz 52' (pen.), 89' (pen.)	J. League	Bisconti 29', 33'; Medina Bello 74'	Attendance: 48,935; Referee: Yoshimi Ogawa; Assistant referees: Kazuaki Hamaguchi, Takeshi Ōkura; Fourth official: Misao Kataoka

7 September 1994 2nd-8	Shimizu S-Pulse	1–1 (V-goal) (a.e.t.) (1–3 p)	JEF United Ichihara	Kusanagi Athletic Stadium
19:07 JST (UTC+09)	Miura 4'	J. League	Kageyama 88'	Attendance: 17,487; Referee: Shizuo Takada; Assistant referees: Tetsu Karakida, Kōji Taniuchi; Fourth official: Masakazu Hōjō; Man of the Match: Yoshikazu Gotō
	Penalties
	(penalty scored) Toninho; (penalty missed) Horiike; (penalty missed) Hasegawa; (penalty missed) Ōta		(penalty scored) Ordenewitz; (penalty missed) Littbarski; (penalty scored) Jō; (penalty scored) Gotō

10 September 1994 2nd-9	JEF United Ichihara	5–1	Júbilo Iwata	Sapporo Atsubetsu Stadium
12:32 JST (UTC+09)	Ordenewitz 29', 76'; Igarashi 42'; Maslovar 80'; Gotō 89'	J. League	Matsubara 74'	Attendance: 18,382; Referee: Zoran Petrović; Assistant referees: Noboru Ishiyama, Kenichi Koshiyama; Fourth official: Eiji Kaneda; Man of the Match: Littbarski

14 September 1994 2nd-10	JEF United Ichihara	0–1 (V-goal) (a.e.t.)	Sanfrecce Hiroshima	Tochigi Utsunomiya Green Stadium
18:32 JST (UTC+09)		J. League	Noh 97'	Attendance: 16,875; Referee: Masahiro Sogawa; Assistant referees: Yū Nakamura, Mitsuru Satō; Fourth official: Hiroshi Suzuki

17 September 1994 2nd-11	Nagoya Grampus Eight	3–1	JEF United Ichihara	Gifu Nagaragawa Stadium
18:00 JST (UTC+09)	Binić 57', 68'; Stojković 74'	J. League	Ordenewitz 67'	Attendance: 24,157; Referee: Yōtarō Moritsu; Assistant referees: Kazuya Yanagisawa, Sōichirō Kaneko; Fourth official: Yasushi Tsuchimoto

21 September 1994 2nd-12	JEF United Ichihara	0–3	Yokohama Flügels	Toyama Stadium
19:05 JST (UTC+09)		J. League	Válber 18'; Yamaguchi 52'; Maeda 66'	Attendance: 23,258; Referee: Alberto Tejada; Assistant referees: Tatsumi Ōno, Kōji Taniuchi; Fourth official: Atsushi Tanaka

19 October 1994 2nd-13	Urawa Red Diamonds	3–2 (V-goal) (a.e.t.)	JEF United Ichihara	Hakatanomori Athletic Stadium
19:03 JST (UTC+09)	Lulu 69'; 89' (o.g.); Rummenigge 102'	J. League	Shin 2'; Ordenewitz 64'	Attendance: 10,915; Referee: Shizuo Takada; Assistant referees: Sōichirō Kaneko, Tōru Yamashiro; Fourth official: Masatoshi Shibata

22 October 1994 2nd-14	JEF United Ichihara	2–1	Bellmare Hiratsuka	Ichihara Stadium
18:33 JST (UTC+09)	Sandro 52'; Nakanishi 60'	J. League	Noguchi 86'	Attendance: 14,635; Referee: Tetsuya Hamana; Assistant referees: Toshiyuki Mayuzumi, Kazuhisa Osada; Fourth official: Misao Kataoka; Man of the Match: Kenichi Shimokawa

26 October 1994 2nd-15	Kashima Antlers	0–1	JEF United Ichihara	Kashima Soccer Stadium
19:02 JST (UTC+09)		J. League	Gotō 86'	Attendance: 15,106; Referee: Masayoshi Okada; Assistant referees: Hiroshi Fukuda, Masahiro Katagiri; Fourth official: Ichirō Inukai; Man of the Match: Yoshikazu Gotō

29 October 1994 2nd-16	JEF United Ichihara	1–3	Verdy Kawasaki	Ichihara Stadium
19:05 JST (UTC+09)	Maslovar 6'	J. League	Takeda 40'; Bismarck 75'; Kitazawa 84'	Attendance: 14,975; Referee: Naotsugu Fuse; Assistant referees: Mitsuru Satō, Masahiro Katagiri; Fourth official: Misao Kataoka

2 November 1994 2nd-17	Yokohama Marinos	3–2	JEF United Ichihara	Tokyo National Stadium
19:01 JST (UTC+09)	Díaz 20'; Medina Bello 68'; Omura 89'	J. League	Ejiri 5'; Ordenewitz 13'	Attendance: 48,677; Referee: Zoran Petrović; Assistant referees: Hiroshi Fukuda, Kazuhisa Osada; Fourth official: Takatoshi Itō

5 November 1994 2nd-18	JEF United Ichihara	1–0	Shimizu S-Pulse	Ichihara Stadium
15:03 JST (UTC+09)	Pavel 5'	J. League		Attendance: 14,331; Referee: Masahiro Sogawa; Assistant referees: Kazuaki Hamaguchi, Toshiyuki Mayuzumi; Fourth official: Tatsuya Sakata; Man of the Match: Eisuke Nakanishi

9 November 1994 2nd-19	Júbilo Iwata	1–0	JEF United Ichihara	Júbilo Iwata Stadium
19:03 JST (UTC+09)	Vanenburg 44' (pen.)	J. League		Attendance: 15,357; Referee: Hideo Kikuchi; Assistant referees: Yasuhiro Hemmi, Hiroshi Tanabe; Fourth official: Toshiaki Futamata

12 November 1994 2nd-20	Sanfrecce Hiroshima	1–0 (V-goal) (a.e.t.)	JEF United Ichihara	Hiroshima Stadium
15:04 JST (UTC+09)	Takagi 93'	J. League		Attendance: 11,765; Referee: Tetsuya Hamana; Assistant referees: Hiroshi Tanabe, Kazunori Ōtoshi; Fourth official: Satoshi Hanashige

16 November 1994 2nd-21	JEF United Ichihara	2–0	Nagoya Grampus Eight	Ichihara Stadium
19:03 JST (UTC+09)	Ordenewitz 70'; Jō 75'	J. League		Attendance: 14,106; Referee: Yoshimi Ogawa; Assistant referees: Takashi Kunori, Satoru Ishizawa; Fourth official: Yoshitoshi Watanabe; Man of the Match: Mikio Manaka

9 November 1994 2nd-22	Gamba Osaka	1–2	JEF United Ichihara	Expo '70 Commemorative Stadium
15:05 JST (UTC+09)	Yamamura 89'	J. League	Ordenewitz 44'; M. Miyazawa 48'	Attendance: 18,417; Referee: Shinichirō Obata; Assistant referees: Kazunori Ōtoshi, Satoru Kawano; Fourth official: Akira Okada; Man of the Match: Sandro

=== Emperor's Cup ===
4 December 1994 1st Round	JEF United Ichihara	2–0	Toshiba	Yokohama Mitsuzawa Football Stadium
: JST (UTC+09)	Ordenewitz (?)

11 December 1994 2nd Round	JEF United Ichihara	1–2 (a.e.t.)	Bellmare Hiratsuka	Maebashi Athletic Stadium
: JST (UTC+09)	Maslovar (?)		Betinho (?); Noguchi (?)

=== J.League Cup ===
27 July 1994 1st Round	Nagoya Grampus Eight	1–3	JEF United Ichihara	Nagoya Mizuho Athletics Stadium
19:03 JST (UTC+09)	Mori 57'	J. League	Jō 5'; Gotō 26'; Niimura 36'	Attendance: 23,765; Referee: Keiichi Sunakawa; Assistant referees: Naoyuki Mori, Mikio Fukuoka; Fourth official: Yūji Kōda

30 July 1994 Quarterfinals	Verdy Kawasaki	1–0 (V-goal) (a.e.t.)	JEF United Ichihara	Kawasaki Todoroki Stadium
19:01 JST (UTC+09)	Bismarck 95'	J. League		Attendance: 10,612; Referee: Kōetsu Kikuchi; Assistant referees: Noboru Ishiyama, Kimio Izaki; Fourth official: Mineo Takada

== Player statistics ==
Pos.	Nat.	Player	D.o.B. (Age)	Height / Weight	J.League		Emperor's Cup		J.League Cup		Total	
Pos.	Nat.	Player	D.o.B. (Age)	Height / Weight	Apps	Goals	Apps	Goals	Apps	Goals	Apps	Goals
MF	(Germany)	Pierre Littbarski	April 16, 1960 (aged 33)	168 cm / 64 kg	28	1	0	0	2	0	30	1
DF	(Japan)	Michael Miyazawa (Note: His name is Michel Miyazawa. But his name is listed with Michael on J.League official books in 1994.)	July 14, 1963 (aged 30)	176 cm / 68 kg	28	2	2	0	0	0	30	2
FW	(Czech Republic)	Pavel	October 7, 1963 (aged 30)	178 cm / 72 kg	16	1	0	0	1	0	17	1
MF	(Japan)	Yoshikazu Gotō	February 20, 1964 (aged 30)	170 cm / 65 kg	36	3	2	0	2	1	40	4
FW	(Germany)	Otze / Ordenewitz	March 25, 1965 (aged 28)	180 cm / 76 kg	40	30	2	2	1	0	43	32
MF	(Japan)	Tōru Yoshida	May 17, 1965 (aged 28)	177 cm / 74 kg	17	0	0	0	2	0	19	0
MF	(Czech Republic)	Franta	June 19, 1965 (aged 28)	174 cm / 72 kg	14	0	0	0	0	0	14	0
DF	(Japan)	Kenji Yamamoto	August 28, 1965 (aged 28)	161 cm / 58 kg	9	0	0	0	0	0	9	0
DF	(Japan)	Kazuya Igarashi	October 24, 1965 (aged 28)	177 cm / 71 kg	36	3	1	0	0	0	37	3
MF	(Japan)	Kazuo Echigo	December 28, 1965 (aged 28)	171 cm / 66 kg	33	7	2	0	2	0	37	7
DF	(Japan)	Masanaga Kageyama	May 23, 1967 (aged 26)	181 cm / 78 kg	25	1	0	0	2	0	27	1
DF	(Japan)	Yūji Sakakura	June 7, 1967 (aged 26)	178 cm / 68 kg	8	0	0	0	2	0	10	0
MF	(Japan)	Atsuhiko Ejiri	July 12, 1967 (aged 26)	177 cm / 68 kg	25	1	1	0	0	0	26	1
DF	(Japan)	Mikio Manaka	May 22, 1969 (aged 24)	171 cm / 70 kg	27	0	2	0	0	0	29	0
MF	(Japan)	Masanori Kizawa	June 2, 1969 (aged 24)	170 cm / 62 kg	23	1	0	0	2	0	25	1
GK	(Japan)	Masahiro Ōta	April 28, 1970 (aged 23)	185 cm / 79 kg	1	0	0	0	0	0	1	0
FW	(Japan)	Yasuhiko Niimura	May 11, 1970 (aged 23)	175 cm / 68 kg	7	0	0	0	1	1	8	1
GK	(Japan)	Kenichi Shimokawa	May 14, 1970 (aged 23)	187 cm / 88 kg	43	0	2	0	2	0	47	0
DF	(Japan)	Tadashi Koya	May 24, 1970 (aged 23)	173 cm / 70 kg	21	0	2	0	0	0	23	0
DF	(Japan)	Hiroshi Miyazawa	November 22, 1970 (aged 23)	183 cm / 80 kg	5	0	0	0	0	0	5	0
FW	(North Korea) (Note: In J.League and domestic competitions, he was considered as a Japanese player.)	Shin Je-Bon	September 27, 1971 (aged 22)	176 cm / 70 kg	8	1	2	0	0	0	10	1
MF	(Japan)	Shinichi Mutō	April 2, 1973 (aged 20)	168 cm / 58 kg	7	0	1	0	0	0	8	0
FW	(Japan)	Munetada Hosaka	May 12, 1973 (aged 20)	169 cm / 61 kg	0	0		0	0	0		0
DF	(Brazil)	Sandro	May 19, 1973 (aged 20)	186 cm / 75 kg	12	1	2	0	0	0	14	1
MF	(Japan)	Eisuke Nakanishi	June 23, 1973 (aged 20)	173 cm / 68 kg	22	1	1	0	2	0	25	1
MF	(Japan)	Hideyuki Sudō	April 5, 1974 (aged 19)	171 cm / 67 kg	0	0		0	0	0		0
GK	(Japan)	Tomonori Tateishi	April 22, 1974 (aged 19)	181 cm / 72 kg	0	0		0	0	0		0
MF	(Japan)	Shigeyuki Satō	May 5, 1974 (aged 19)	165 cm / 57 kg	0	0		0	0	0		0
FW	(Japan)	Hiroyuki Maeda	May 22, 1974 (aged 19)	182 cm / 75 kg	0	0		0	0	0		0
DF	(Japan)	Hidetatsu Satō	June 18, 1974 (aged 19)	171 cm / 60 kg	0	0		0	0	0		0
DF	(Japan)	Jun Mizuno	August 7, 1974 (aged 19)	173 cm / 66 kg	4	0	0	0	0	0	4	0
DF	(Japan)	Teppei Isaka	October 23, 1974 (aged 19)	182 cm / 72 kg	1	0	0	0	0	0	1	0
FW	(Japan)	Kinya Takehara	November 16, 1974 (aged 19)	172 cm / 62 kg	0	0		0	0	0		0
DF	(Japan)	Hideo Suzuki	May 12, 1975 (aged 18)	175 cm / 63 kg	0	0		0	0	0		0
DF	(Japan)	Masatoshi Hara	June 16, 1975 (aged 18)	181 cm / 77 kg	0	0		0	0	0		0
FW	(Japan)	Shōji Jō	June 17, 1975 (aged 18)	178 cm / 72 kg	33	12	2	0	2	1	37	13
DF	(Japan)	Tadahiro Akiba	October 13, 1975 (aged 18)	173 cm / 65 kg	1	0	0	0	0	0	1	0
MF	(Japan)	Shinji Ōtsuka	December 29, 1975 (aged 18)	180 cm / 67 kg	0	0		0	0	0		0
GK	(Japan)	Shinobu Nagata	January 29, 1976 (aged 18)	179 cm / 70 kg	0	0		0	0	0		0
MF	(Federal Republic of Yugoslavia)	Nenad Maslovar †	February 20, 1967 (aged 27)	182 cm / 76 kg	15	4	2	1	2	0	19	5
MF	(Japan)	Shū Yashiro †	April 17, 1971 (aged 22)	161 cm / 56 kg	0	0		0	0	0		0

- † player(s) joined the team after the opening of this season.

== Transfers ==
In:

No.	Pos.	Nation	Player
—	GK	JPN	Shinobu Nagata (from JEF United Ichihara youth)
—	DF	JPN	Kenji Yamamoto (from NTT Kanto)
—	DF	JPN	Hideo Suzuki (from JEF United Ichihara youth)
—	DF	JPN	Masatoshi Hara (from Narashino High School)
—	DF	JPN	Tadahiro Akiba (from Funabashi municipal High School)
—	MF	JPN	Shinji Ōtsuka (from Narashino High School)
—	FW	JPN	Shōji Jō (from Kagoshima Jitsugyo High School)

Out:

No.	Pos.	Nation	Player
—	GK	JPN	Yoshio Katō
—	GK	JPN	Akio Sano
—	DF	JPN	Naoki Honmachi
—	MF	JPN	Masaaki Kanno (to Kyoto Purple Sanga)
—	MF	JPN	Masanao Sasaki (to Kashiwa Reysol)
—	MF	JPN	Kazuyuki Kyōya (retired)
—	FW	JPN	Keisuke Makino (to Cerezo Osaka)
—	FW	JPN	Kei Hirata

== Transfers during the season ==
=== In ===
- (Japan) Shū Yashiro (from Meiji University)
- (Federal Republic of Yugoslavia) Nenad Maslovar (from Red Star on July)

=== Out ===
- (Germany) Pierre Littbarski (on November)

== Awards ==
- J.League Top Scorer: (Germany) Ordenewitz

== Other pages ==
- (in Japanese) J. League official site
- (in Japanese) JEF United Ichihara Chiba official web site
