= Shinji Otsuka =

Japanese footballer

Shinji Otsuka 大塚 真司
Personal information
- Full name: Shinji Otsuka
- Date of birth: December 29, 1975 (age 50)
- Place of birth: Chiba, Japan
- Height: 1.79 m (5 ft 10 1/2 in)
- Position: Midfielder

Youth career
- 1991–1993: Narashino High School

Senior career*
Years	Team	Apps	(Gls)
1994–1996	JEF United Ichihara	5	(0)
1997–2000	Kawasaki Frontale	95	(4)
2001–2003	Omiya Ardija	78	(5)
2004–2005	Montedio Yamagata	79	(6)
2006–2008	Consadole Sapporo	85	(2)
Total		342	(17)

Managerial career
- 2024–2025: Ventforet Kofu
Medal record
Kawasaki Frontale
Runner-up	J.League Cup	2000
Consadole Sapporo
Winner	J2 League	2007
- * Club domestic league appearances and goals

Shinji Otsuka (大塚 真司, Otsuka Shinji; born December 29, 1975) is a Japanese professional football manager and former player who is the manager of J2 League club Ventforet Kofu.

== Club career ==
Otsuka was born in Chiba Prefecture on December 29, 1975. After graduating from high school, he joined his local club JEF United Ichihara in 1994. However he could hardly play in the match and he moved to Japan Football League club Kawasaki Frontale in 1997. He played many matches as defensive midfielder. The club was also promoted to J2 League in 1999 and J1 League in 2000. He moved to Omiya Ardija in 2001. Although he played as regular player in 2001, his opportunity to play decreased from 2002. He moved to Montedio Yamagata in 2004 and Consadole Sapporo in 2006. He played as regular player at both clubs until 2007. However he got hurt in October 2007. He could hardly play in the match in 2008 and retired end of 2008 season.

== International career ==
In April 1995, Otsuka was selected Japan U-20 national team for 1995 World Youth Championship. But he did not play in the match.

== Managerial career ==
In July 2024, Otsuka was named manager of J2 League club Ventforet Kofu following the dismissal of Yoshiyuki Shinoda. He had been working as head coach of the club since 2022. His appointment was his first managerial role after coaching at various clubs since 2009.

== Club statistics ==
Club performance			League		Cup		League Cup		Total	
Season	Club	League	Apps	Goals	Apps	Goals	Apps	Goals	Apps	Goals
Japan			League		Emperor's Cup		J.League Cup		Total	
1994	JEF United Ichihara	J1 League	0	0	0	0	0	0	0	0
1995	JEF United Ichihara	J1 League	0	0	0	0	-		0	0
1996	JEF United Ichihara	J1 League	5	0	0	0	2	0	7	0
1997	Kawasaki Frontale	Football League	25	3	2	0	-		27	3
1998	Kawasaki Frontale	Football League	21	1	3	0	4	0	28	1
1999	Kawasaki Frontale	J2 League	32	0	4	2	1	0	37	2
2000	Kawasaki Frontale	J1 League	17	0	0	0	4	0	21	0
2001	Omiya Ardija	J2 League	40	3	0	0	0	0	40	3
2002	Omiya Ardija	J2 League	15	1	4	1	-		19	2
2003	Omiya Ardija	J2 League	23	1	0	0	-		23	1
2004	Montedio Yamagata	J2 League	40	3	2	0	-		42	3
2005	Montedio Yamagata	J2 League	39	3	2	0	-		41	3
2006	Consadole Sapporo	J2 League	39	2	3	0	-		42	2
2007	Consadole Sapporo	J2 League	39	0	1	0	-		40	0
2008	Consadole Sapporo	J1 League	7	0	1	0	0	0	8	0
Total			342	17	22	3	11	0	375	20
