= Atsuhiko Ejiri =

Japanese footballer

Atsuhiko Ejiri 江尻 篤彦
Personal information
- Full name: Atsuhiko Ejiri
- Date of birth: July 12, 1967 (age 59)
- Place of birth: Shizuoka, Japan
- Height: 1.78 m (5 ft 10 in)
- Position: Midfielder

Youth career
- 1983–1985: Shimizu Shogyo High School

College career
Years	Team	Apps	(Gls)
1986–1989	Meiji University		

Senior career*
Years	Team	Apps	(Gls)
1990–1998	JEF United Ichihara	218	(26)
Total		218	(26)

Managerial career
- 2009–2010: JEF United Chiba
- 2019: JEF United Chiba
Medal record
JEF United Ichihara
Runner-up	JSL Cup	1990
Runner-up	J.League Cup	1998
- * Club domestic league appearances and goals

Atsuhiko Ejiri (江尻 篤彦, Ejiri Atsuhiko; born July 12, 1967) is a Japanese football manager and former football player.

== Playing career ==
Ejiri was born in Shizuoka Prefecture on July 12, 1967. After graduating from Meiji University, he joined Japan Soccer League club Furukawa Electric (later JEF United Ichihara) in 1990. He played many matches as offensive midfielder from first season and the club won the 2nd place 1990 JSL Cup. In 1992, Japan Soccer League was folded and founded new league J1 League. He played as regular player and also served a captain from 1996. The club won the 2nd place 1998 J.League Cup. He retired end of 1998 season.

== Coaching career ==
After retirement, Ejiri became a coach for JEF United Ichihara (later JEF United Chiba) in 1999. He mainly served as coach for top team. In 2005, he moved to Albirex Niigata and became a coach under manager Yasuharu Sorimachi (2005) and Jun Suzuki (2006). In 2007, he became a coach for Japan U-23 national team under manager Sorimachi and participated in 2008 Summer Olympics.

In 2009, Ejiri returned to JEF United and became a coach under manager Alex Miller. However the club performance was bad and manager Miller was sacked in July 2009. Ejiri became a manager as Miller successor. Although Ejiri managed in 15 matches, the club won only one match and finished at bottom place in the season. The club was relegated from the division 1 first time in the club history. Although he also managed in 2010 season, the club could not return division 1 and he resigned end of 2010 season.

On 18 March 2019, he was appointed manager once again, after the departure of argentine Juan Esnáider. He left his position at the end of 2019 season.

== Club statistics ==
Club performance			League		Cup		League Cup		Total	
Season	Club	League	Apps	Goals	Apps	Goals	Apps	Goals	Apps	Goals
Japan			League		Emperor's Cup		J.League Cup		Total	
1990/91	Furukawa Electric	JSL Division 1	15	1			5	0	20	1
1991/92	Furukawa Electric	JSL Division 1	10	1			0	0	10	1
1992	JEF United Ichihara	J1 League	-				9	0	9	0
1993	JEF United Ichihara	J1 League	36	4	3	1	3	1	42	6
1994	JEF United Ichihara	J1 League	25	1	1	0	0	0	26	1
1995	JEF United Ichihara	J1 League	43	13	1	0	-		44	13
1996	JEF United Ichihara	J1 League	29	2	1	0	14	1	44	3
1997	JEF United Ichihara	J1 League	30	1	1	0	7	0	38	1
1998	JEF United Ichihara	J1 League	30	3	1	0	6	0	37	3
Total			218	26	8	1	44	2	270	29

== Managerial statistics ==
Update; November 25, 2019

Team	From	To	Record				
Team	From	To	G	W	D	L	Win %
JEF United Chiba	2009	2010	51	19	12	20	37.25
JEF United Chiba	2019	2019	38	10	11	17	26.32
Total			89	29	23	37	32.58
