= Kenichi Shimokawa =

Japanese footballer

Kenichi Shimokawa 下川 健一
Personal information
- Full name: Kenichi Shimokawa
- Date of birth: May 14, 1970 (age 56)
- Place of birth: Gifu, Japan
- Height: 1.88 m (6 ft 2 in)
- Position: Goalkeeper

Youth career
- 1986–1988: Gifu Technical High School

Senior career*
Years	Team	Apps	(Gls)
1989–2000	JEF United Ichihara	276	(0)
2001–2006	Yokohama F. Marinos	1	(0)
Total		277	(0)

International career
1995–1997	Japan	9	(0)
Medal record
JEF United Ichihara
Runner-up	JSL Cup	1990
Runner-up	J.League Cup	1998
Yokohama F. Marinos
Winner	J1 League	2003
Winner	J1 League	2004
Runner-up	J1 League	2002
Winner	J.League Cup	2001
- * Club domestic league appearances and goals

Kenichi Shimokawa (下川 健一, Shimokawa Kenichi; born May 14, 1970) is a former Japanese football player. He played for Japan national team.

== Club career ==
Shimokawa was born in Gifu on May 14, 1970. After graduating from high school, he joined Furukawa Electric (later JEF United Ichihara) in 1989. From first season, he played as regular goalkeeper over 10 seasons. In 2000, his opportunity to play decreased behind Ryo Kushino. He moved to Yokohama F. Marinos in 2001. However, there were few opportunities to play in the match. His only match in the J1 League at Yokohama F. Marinos is last game in 2003 season. In this match, he played instead Tetsuya Enomoto was shown a red card in the 15th minute. Marinos won this match and won the J1 League champions in this season. He retired end of 2006 season.

== National team career ==
On June 10, 1995, Shimokawa debuted for Japan national team against Sweden. He played in all match at 1996 Asian Cup. He played 9 games for Japan until 1997.

== Club statistics ==
Club performance			League		Cup		League Cup		Total	
Season	Club	League	Apps	Goals	Apps	Goals	Apps	Goals	Apps	Goals
Japan			League		Emperor's Cup		J.League Cup		Total	
1989/90	Furukawa Electric	JSL Division 1	20	0			0	0	20	0
1990/91	Furukawa Electric	JSL Division 1	21	0			0	0	21	0
1991/92	Furukawa Electric	JSL Division 1	16	0			0	0	16	0
1992	JEF United Ichihara	J1 League	-		0	0	5	0	5	0
1993	JEF United Ichihara	J1 League	14	0	3	0	0	0	17	0
1994	JEF United Ichihara	J1 League	43	0	2	0	2	0	47	0
1995	JEF United Ichihara	J1 League	44	0	1	0	-		45	0
1996	JEF United Ichihara	J1 League	30	0	1	0	14	0	45	0
1997	JEF United Ichihara	J1 League	15	0	2	0	7	0	24	0
1998	JEF United Ichihara	J1 League	32	0	0	0	4	0	36	0
1999	JEF United Ichihara	J1 League	30	0	1	0	0	0	31	0
2000	JEF United Ichihara	J1 League	13	0	0	0	2	0	15	0
2001	Yokohama F. Marinos	J1 League	0	0	0	0	0	0	0	0
2002	Yokohama F. Marinos	J1 League	0	0	0	0	0	0	0	0
2003	Yokohama F. Marinos	J1 League	1	0	1	0	0	0	2	0
2004	Yokohama F. Marinos	J1 League	0	0	1	0	0	0	1	0
2005	Yokohama F. Marinos	J1 League	0	0	0	0	0	0	0	0
2006	Yokohama F. Marinos	J1 League	0	0	0	0	0	0	0	0
Total			277	0	12	0	34	0	323	0

== National team statistics ==
Japan national team
Year	Apps	Goals
1995	1	0
1996	7	0
1997	1	0
Total	9	0

- 1996 Asian Cup
