= Sandro (footballer, born 1973) =

Brazilian footballer

Personal information
- Full name: Sandro Chaves de Assis Rosa
- Date of birth: 19 May 1973 (age 53)
- Place of birth: Brazil
- Height: 1.84 m (6 ft 0 in)
- Position: Defensive midfielder

Youth career
- Portuguesa
- Shibuya Makuhari High School

Senior career*
Years	Team	Apps	(Gls)
1992–1996	JEF United Ichihara	72	(3)
1997	Honda	28	(2)
1998–2001	FC Tokyo	123	(4)
2002–2004	Oita Trinita	89	(7)
2005	ABC		
2005–2006	Pogoń Szczecin	4	(0)
2006	Ceará		
- * Club domestic league appearances and goals

Sandro Chaves de Assis Rosa (born 19 May 1973) is a Brazilian former professional footballer who played as a defensive midfielder. He has spent most of his football career in Japan where he moved to complete his high school studies.

He played for FC Tokyo and Oita Trinita in the J1 League before moving to Polish Ekstraklasa side Pogoń Szczecin.

== Club statistics ==
Club performance			League		Cup		League Cup		Total	
Season	Club	League	Apps	Goals	Apps	Goals	Apps	Goals	Apps	Goals
Japan			League		Emperor's Cup		J.League Cup		Total	
1992	JEF United Ichihara	J1 League	-				8	0	8	0
1993	JEF United Ichihara	J1 League	4	0	0	0	0	0	4	0
1994	JEF United Ichihara	J1 League	12	1	2	0	0	0	14	1
1995	JEF United Ichihara	J1 League	32	0	1	0	-		33	0
1996	JEF United Ichihara	J1 League	24	2	0	0	13	1	37	3
1997	Honda	Football League	28	2	3	0	-		31	2
1998	Tokyo Gas	Football League	29	1	3	0	-		32	1
1999	FC Tokyo	J2 League	36	3	4	0	7	1	47	4
2000	FC Tokyo	J1 League	29	0	1	0	2	0	32	0
2001	FC Tokyo	J1 League	29	0	0	0	4	0	33	0
2002	Oita Trinita	J2 League	37	4	2	0	-		39	4
2003	Oita Trinita	J1 League	27	2	1	0	3	0	31	2
2004	Oita Trinita	J1 League	25	1	1	0	2	0	28	1
Total			312	16	18	0	39	2	369	18
