= Yasuhiko Niimura =

Japanese footballer

Yasuhiko Niimura 新村 泰彦
Personal information
- Full name: Yasuhiko Niimura
- Date of birth: May 11, 1970 (age 56)
- Place of birth: Numazu, Japan
- Height: 1.75 m (5 ft 9 in)
- Position: Forward

Youth career
- 1986–1988: Nihon University Mishima High School
- 1989–1992: Kokushikan University

Senior career*
Years	Team	Apps	(Gls)
1993–1996	JEF United Ichihara	80	(14)
1997	Consadole Sapporo	14	(0)
1998–2003	Jatco		
Total		94	(14)
- * Club domestic league appearances and goals

Yasuhiko Niimura (新村 泰彦, Niimura Yasuhiko; born May 11, 1970) is a former Japanese football player.

== Playing career ==
Niimura was born in Numazu on May 11, 1970. After graduating from Kokushikan University, he joined JEF United Ichihara in 1993. He played many matches as forward from first season. In 1997, he moved to Japan Football League (JFL) club Consadole Sapporo. The club won the champions in 1997 and was promoted to J1 League end of the season. However he moved to JFL club Jatco in 1998. Although he played in 6 seasons, the club was disbanded end of 2003 season.

== Career statistics ==
Appearances and goals by club, season and competition
Club	Season	League			Emperor's Cup		J.League Cup		Total	
Club	Season	Division	Apps	Goals	Apps	Goals	Apps	Goals	Apps	Goals
JEF United Ichihara	1993	J1 League	25	2	2	0	4	0	31	2
JEF United Ichihara	1994	J1 League	7	0	0	0	1	1	8	1
JEF United Ichihara	1995	J1 League	27	11	0	0	—		27	11
JEF United Ichihara	1996	J1 League	21	1	1	0	6	1	28	2
Consadole Sapporo	1997	Football League	14	0	0	0	6	2	20	2
Career total			94	14	3	0	17	4	114	18
