= Nenad Maslovar =

Montenegrin footballer (born 1967)

Personal information
- Full name: Nenad Maslovar
- Date of birth: 20 February 1967 (age 59)
- Place of birth: Kotor, SFR Yugoslavia
- Height: 1.82 m (6 ft 0 in)
- Position: Midfielder

Senior career*
Years	Team	Apps	(Gls)
1986–1988	Bokelj		
1988–1990	Spartak Subotica	31	(1)
1990–1992	Velež Mostar	53	(7)
1992–1994	Red Star Belgrade	60	(19)
1994–1998	JEF United Ichihara	128	(41)
1999	Avispa Fukuoka	22	(4)

International career
1997	FR Yugoslavia	3	(0)

Managerial career
- 2009: OFK Grbalj
- * Club domestic league appearances and goals

Nenad Maslovar (Serbian Cyrillic: Ненад Масловар, born 20 February 1967) is a Montenegrin retired football player. He is currently president of Montenegrin Second League team OFK Grbalj.

== Club career ==
Born in Kotor, SR Montenegro, SFR Yugoslavia, he made his debut as senior with FK Bokelj during the 1986/87 season of the Yugoslav Second League. He continued his career in Yugoslav First League clubs FK Spartak Subotica and FK Velež Mostar reaching his highlight during the 1990s when he played with Red Star Belgrade becoming in that period a national team player. His last six years of his career he spent in Japan.

== International career ==
Maslovar made his debut for FR Yugoslavia on 12 June 1997, in a friendly match against Ghana at a Korean tournament and has earned a total of 3 caps, scoring no goals. His final international was four days later against hosts South Korea.

== Personal life ==
He was elected president of OFK Grbalj in November 2018.

== Club statistics ==
Club performance			League		Cup		League Cup		Total	
Season	Club	League	Apps	Goals	Apps	Goals	Apps	Goals	Apps	Goals
Yugoslavia			League		Yugoslav Cup		League Cup		Total	
1988/89	Spartak Subotica	First League	14	1					14	1
1989/90	Spartak Subotica	First League	17	0					17	0
1989/90	Velež Mostar	First League	8	0					8	0
1990/91	Velež Mostar	First League	29	2					29	2
1991/92	Velež Mostar	First League	16	5					16	5
Serbia			League		Serbian Cup		League Cup		Total	
1992/93	Red Star Belgrade	First League	29	5					29	5
1993/94	Red Star Belgrade	First League	31	14					31	14
Japan			League		Emperor's Cup		J.League Cup		Total	
1994	JEF United Ichihara	J1 League	15	4	2	1	2	0	19	5
1995	JEF United Ichihara	J1 League	52	16	1	0	-		53	16
1996	JEF United Ichihara	J1 League	17	4	1	0	10	3	28	7
1997	JEF United Ichihara	J1 League	17	9	2	0	4	3	23	11
1998	JEF United Ichihara	J1 League	27	8	1	0	6	6	34	14
1999	Avispa Fukuoka	J1 League	22	4	0	0	2	0	24	4
Country	Yugoslavia		84	8					84	8
Country	Serbia		60	19					60	19
Country	Japan		150	45	7	1	24	12	181	58
Total			294	72	7	1	24	12	345	85
