= Kazuya Igarashi =

Japanese footballer (born 1965)

Kazuya Igarashi 五十嵐 和也
Personal information
- Full name: Kazuya Igarashi
- Date of birth: October 24, 1965 (age 61)
- Place of birth: Iwate, Japan
- Height: 1.77 m (5 ft 9 1/2 in)
- Position: Defender

Youth career
- 1981–1983: Tono High School

Senior career*
Years	Team	Apps	(Gls)
1984–1996	JEF United Ichihara	191	(4)
1997–2000	Yokogawa Electric		
Total		191	(4)
Medal record
JEF United Ichihara
Winner	Japan Soccer League	1985/86
Winner	JSL Cup	1986
Runner-up	JSL Cup	1990
Runner-up	Emperor's Cup	1984
- * Club domestic league appearances and goals

Kazuya Igarashi (五十嵐 和也, Igarashi Kazuya; born October 24, 1965) is a former Japanese football player.

== Playing career ==
Igarashi was born in Iwate Prefecture on October 24, 1965. After graduating from high school, he joined Furukawa Electric (later JEF United Ichihara) in 1984. He played many matches from 1985 and the club won the championship for the 1985–86 Japan Soccer League and 1986 JSL Cup. In Asia, the club won the championship at the 1986 Asian Club Championship. This was the first Asian championship by a Japanese club. He played for the club until 1996. In 1997, he moved to the Regional Leagues club Yokogawa Electric. The club was promoted to the new Japan Football League in 1999. He retired at the end of the 2000 season.

== Club statistics ==
Club performance			League		Cup		League Cup		Total	
Season	Club	League	Apps	Goals	Apps	Goals	Apps	Goals	Apps	Goals
Japan			League		Emperor's Cup		J.League Cup		Total	
1984	Furukawa Electric	JSL Division 1								
1985/86	Furukawa Electric	JSL Division 1								
1986/87	Furukawa Electric	JSL Division 1								
1987/88	Furukawa Electric	JSL Division 1								
1988/89	Furukawa Electric	JSL Division 1								
1989/90	Furukawa Electric	JSL Division 1	20	0			2	0	22	0
1990/91	Furukawa Electric	JSL Division 1	20	0			0	0	20	0
1991/92	Furukawa Electric	JSL Division 1	19	0			1	0	20	0
1992	JEF United Ichihara	J1 League	-				2	0	2	0
1993	JEF United Ichihara	J1 League	7	0	1	0	2	0	10	0
1994	JEF United Ichihara	J1 League	36	3	1	0	0	0	37	3
1995	JEF United Ichihara	J1 League	19	0	0	0	-		19	0
1996	JEF United Ichihara	J1 League	14	1	0	0	3	0	17	1
1997	Yokogawa Electric	Regional Leagues								
1998	Yokogawa Electric	Regional Leagues								
1999	Yokogawa Electric	Football League	23	0	0	0	-		23	0
2000	Yokogawa Electric	Football League	12	0	1	0	-		13	0
Total			170	4	3	0	10	0	183	4
