= Mikio Manaka =

Japanese footballer (born 1969)

Mikio Manaka 眞中 幹夫
Personal information
- Full name: Mikio Manaka
- Date of birth: May 22, 1969 (age 57)
- Place of birth: Bando, Ibaraki, Japan
- Height: 1.71 m (5 ft 7 1/2 in)
- Position: Defender

Youth career
- 1985–1987: Sakai High School

College career
Years	Team	Apps	(Gls)
1988–1991	University of Tsukuba		

Senior career*
Years	Team	Apps	(Gls)
1992–1996	JEF United Ichihara	101	(0)
1997	Brummell Sendai	4	(0)
1998	Omiya Ardija	22	(0)
1999–2004	Yokohama FC	103	(4)
Total		230	(4)
- * Club domestic league appearances and goals

Mikio Manaka (眞中 幹夫, Manaka Mikio; born May 22, 1969) is a Japanese former footballer. His younger brother Yasuo Manaka is also a former footballer.

== Playing career ==
Manaka was born in Bando on May 22, 1969. After graduating from University of Tsukuba, he joined JEF United Ichihara in 1992. From 1994, he played many matches as a centre back. He moved to Japan Football League club Brummell Sendai in 1997. However, he only made four appearances and moved to Omiya Ardija in 1998. In 1999, he moved to Japan Football League club Yokohama FC. The club were champions in 1999 and 2000 and were promoted to the J2 League. In July 2004, his younger brother Yasuo Manaka also came to the club. He retired with Yasuo at the end of the 2004 season.

== Club statistics ==
Club performance			League		Cup		League Cup		Total	
Season	Club	League	Apps	Goals	Apps	Goals	Apps	Goals	Apps	Goals
Japan			League		Emperor's Cup		League Cup		Total	
1992	JEF United Ichihara	J1 League	-				0	0	0	0
1993	JEF United Ichihara	J1 League	6	0	1	0	1	0	8	0
1994	JEF United Ichihara	J1 League	27	0	2	0	0	0	29	0
1995	JEF United Ichihara	J1 League	48	0	1	0	-		49	0
1996	JEF United Ichihara	J1 League	20	0	1	0	14	0	35	0
1997	Brummell Sendai	Football League	4	0	2	0	3	0	9	0
1998	Omiya Ardija	Football League	22	0	0	0	-		22	0
1999	Yokohama FC	Football League	16	0	2	0	-		18	0
2000	Yokohama FC	Football League	19	1	2	0	-		21	1
2001	Yokohama FC	J2 League	17	1	0	0	3	0	20	1
2002	Yokohama FC	J2 League	19	0	1	0	-		20	0
2003	Yokohama FC	J2 League	28	2	0	0	-		28	2
2004	Yokohama FC	J2 League	4	0	0	0	-		4	0
Career total			230	4	12	0	21	0	263	4
