= Eisuke Nakanishi =

Japanese footballer

Eisuke Nakanishi 中西 永輔
Personal information
- Date of birth: June 23, 1973 (age 53)
- Place of birth: Suzuka, Mie, Japan
- Height: 1.74 m (5 ft 9 in)
- Position: Defender

Youth career
- 1989–1991: Yokkaichi Chuo Kogyo High School

Senior career*
Years	Team	Apps	(Gls)
1992–2003	JEF United Ichihara	273	(34)
2004–2006	Yokohama F. Marinos	36	(0)
Total		309	(34)

International career
1997–2002	Japan	14	(0)
Medal record
JEF United Ichihara
Runner-up	J.League Cup	1998
Yokohama F. Marinos
Winner	J1 League	2004
- * Club domestic league appearances and goals

Eisuke Nakanishi (中西 永輔, Nakanishi Eisuke; born June 23, 1973) is a Japanese former professional footballer who played as a defender. He played for the Japan national team.

== Club career ==
Nakanishi was born in Suzuka on June 23, 1973. Although he mainly played as a defender, he lso played as a amidfielder and a forward in the mid-1990s. After graduating from high school, he joined JEF United Ichihara in 1992. The club finished in 2nd place at the 1998 J.League Cup and 3rd place in 2001 and 2003 J1 League. He moved to Yokohama F. Marinos in 2004. The club became champions of the 2004 J1 League. He retired at the end of the 2006 season.

== International career ==
In September 1997, Nakanishi was selected to the Japan national team for 1998 World Cup qualification. At this qualification, on September 7, he debuted against Uzbekistan. At the 1998 World Cup, he played in the first two games alongside Masami Ihara and Yutaka Akita. However, he missed the third game. He played 14 matches for Japan until 2002.

== Honours ==
J - League: 2004

== Career statistics ==
=== Club ===
Appearances and goals by club, season and competition
Club	Season	League			Emperor's Cup		J.League Cup		Asia		Total	
Club	Season	Division	Apps	Goals	Apps	Goals	Apps	Goals	Apps	Goals	Apps	Goals
JEF United Ichihara	1992	J1 League	–				7	0	–		7	0
JEF United Ichihara	1993	J1 League	32	2	1	0	6	3	–		39	5
JEF United Ichihara	1994	J1 League	22	1	1	0	2	0	–		25	1
JEF United Ichihara	1995	J1 League	31	5	1	0	–		–		32	5
JEF United Ichihara	1996	J1 League	20	5	0	0	10	1	–		30	6
JEF United Ichihara	1997	J1 League	18	4	1	1	6	1	–		25	6
JEF United Ichihara	1998	J1 League	22	2	1	0	2	0	–		25	2
JEF United Ichihara	1999	J1 League	26	9	1	1	1	0	–		28	10
JEF United Ichihara	2000	J1 League	27	3	3	0	1	0	–		31	3
JEF United Ichihara	2001	J1 League	29	3	3	2	4	0	–		36	5
JEF United Ichihara	2002	J1 League	24	0	2	0	4	0	–		30	0
JEF United Ichihara	2003	J1 League	22	0	0	0	2	1	–		24	1
Yokohama F. Marinos	2004	J1 League	20	0	0	0	6	0	3	0	29	0
Yokohama F. Marinos	2005	J1 League	13	0	2	0	1	0	3	0	19	0
Yokohama F. Marinos	2006	J1 League	3	0	0	0	3	0	–		6	0
Career total			309	34	16	4	55	6	6	0	386	44

=== International ===
Appearances and goals by national team and year
National team	Year	Apps	Goals
Japan	1997	5	0
Japan	1998	6	0
Japan	1999	1	0
Japan	2000	1	0
Japan	2001	0	0
Japan	2002	1	0
Total		14	0
