= Shinichi Muto =

Japanese footballer and manager

Shinichi Muto 武藤 真一
Personal information
- Full name: Shinichi Muto
- Date of birth: April 2, 1973 (age 53)
- Place of birth: Sendai, Japan
- Height: 1.68 m (5 ft 6 in)
- Position: Midfielder

Youth career
- 1989–1991: Sendai Ikuei High School

Senior career*
| Years | Team | Apps | (Gls) |
| 1992–2003 | JEF United Ichihara | 195 | (13) |
| 2003 | Oita Trinita | 9 | (0) |
| 2004–2005 | Grulla Morioka | | |
| 2006–2007 | FC Ganju Iwate | | |
| Total | | 204 | (13) |

Managerial career
- 2004–2005: Grulla Morioka
- 2006–2007: FC Ganju Iwate
Medal record
JEF United Ichihara
| Runner-up | J.League Cup | 1998 |
- * Club domestic league appearances and goals

Shinichi Muto (武藤 真一, Muto Shinichi; born April 2, 1973) is a former Japanese football player and manager.

== Playing career ==
Muto was born in Sendai on April 2, 1973. After graduating from high school, he joined JEF United Ichihara in 1992. He debuted in 1994 and became a regular player as left side back and left side midfielder from 1997. In 2000s, he mainly played as defensive midfielder. In 2003, his opportunity to play decreased and he moved to Oita Trinita in June 2003. From 2004, he played as playing manager for Grulla Morioka (2004–05) and FC Ganju Iwate (2006-07). He retired end of 2007 season.

== Coaching career ==
In 2004, when Muto was player, he moved to Grulla Morioka and became a playing manager. He moved to FC Ganju Iwate in 2006 and became a playing manager. End of 2007 season, he retired from playing career and he left the club.

== Career statistics ==
Appearances and goals by club, season and competition
| Club | Season | League | | | Emperor's Cup | | J.League Cup | | Total | |
| Club | Season | Division | Apps | Goals | Apps | Goals | Apps | Goals | Apps | Goals |
|---|---|---|---|---|---|---|---|---|---|---|
| JEF United Ichihara | 1992 | J League | — | | 0 | 0 | 0 | 0 | 0 | 0 |
| JEF United Ichihara | 1993 | J League | 0 | 0 | 0 | 0 | 0 | 0 | 0 | 0 |
| JEF United Ichihara | 1994 | J League | 7 | 0 | 1 | 0 | 0 | 0 | 8 | 0 |
| JEF United Ichihara | 1995 | J League | 14 | 1 | 1 | 0 | — | | 15 | 1 |
| JEF United Ichihara | 1996 | J League | 18 | 2 | 1 | 0 | 12 | 0 | 31 | 2 |
| JEF United Ichihara | 1997 | J League | 28 | 1 | 2 | 0 | 8 | 0 | 38 | 1 |
| JEF United Ichihara | 1998 | J League | 32 | 3 | 1 | 0 | 6 | 1 | 39 | 4 |
| JEF United Ichihara | 1999 | J League | 15 | 1 | 1 | 0 | 2 | 0 | 18 | 1 |
| JEF United Ichihara | 2000 | J League | 25 | 2 | 3 | 1 | 2 | 0 | 30 | 3 |
| JEF United Ichihara | 2001 | J League | 28 | 3 | 3 | 0 | 4 | 0 | 35 | 3 |
| JEF United Ichihara | 2002 | J League | 25 | 0 | 3 | 0 | 7 | 3 | 35 | 3 |
| JEF United Ichihara | 2003 | J League | 3 | 0 | 0 | 0 | 1 | 0 | 4 | 0 |
| Oita Trinita | 2003 | J1 League | 9 | 0 | 0 | 0 | 1 | 0 | 10 | 0 |
| Career total | | | 204 | 13 | 16 | 1 | 43 | 4 | 263 | 18 |
