= Kenji Yamamoto (footballer) =

Japanese footballer

Kenji Yamamoto 山本 健二
Personal information
- Full name: Kenji Yamamoto
- Date of birth: August 28, 1965 (age 61)
- Place of birth: Yamanashi, Japan]
- Height: 1.61 m (5 ft 3 1/2 in)
- Position: Defender

Youth career
- 1981–1983: Nirasaki High School
- 1984–1987: Komazawa University

Senior career*
Years	Team	Apps	(Gls)
1988–1992	JEF United Ichihara	53	(0)
1993	NTT Kanto	9	(0)
1994–1995	JEF United Ichihara	29	(0)
Total		91	(0)
Medal record
JEF United Ichihara
Runner-up	JSL Cup	1990
- * Club domestic league appearances and goals

Kenji Yamamoto (山本 健二, Yamamoto Kenji; born August 28, 1965) is a former Japanese football player.

== Playing career ==
Yamamoto was born in Yamanashi Prefecture on August 28, 1965. After graduating from Komazawa University, he joined Furukawa Electric (later JEF United Ichihara) in 1988. In 1993, he moved to Japan Football League club NTT Kanto. He returned to JEF United in 1994. He retired end of 1995 season.

== Club statistics ==
Club performance			League		Cup		League Cup		Total	
Season	Club	League	Apps	Goals	Apps	Goals	Apps	Goals	Apps	Goals
Japan			League		Emperor's Cup		J.League Cup		Total	
1988/89	Furukawa Electric	JSL Division 1	19	0			2	0	21	0
1989/90	Furukawa Electric	JSL Division 1	16	0			1	0	17	0
1990/91	Furukawa Electric	JSL Division 1	10	0			0	0	10	0
1991/92	Furukawa Electric	JSL Division 1	8	0					8	0
1992	JEF United Ichihara	J1 League	-				1	0	1	0
1993	NTT Kanto	Football League	9	0	0	0	-		9	0
1994	JEF United Ichihara	J1 League	9	0	0	0	0	0	9	0
1995	JEF United Ichihara	J1 League	20	0	0	0	-		20	0
Total			91	0	0	0	4	0	95	0
