= Tadashi Koya =

Japanese footballer (born 1970)

Tadashi Koya 小屋 禎
Personal information
- Full name: Tadashi Koya
- Date of birth: May 24, 1970 (age 56)
- Place of birth: Kanagawa, Japan
- Height: 1.73 m (5 ft 8 in)
- Position: Defender

Youth career
- 1986–1988: Nihon University Fujisawa High School
- 1989–1992: Aoyama Gakuin University

Senior career*
Years	Team	Apps	(Gls)
1993–1995	JEF United Ichihara	24	(0)
1996	Brummell Sendai	10	(1)
Total		34	(1)
- * Club domestic league appearances and goals

Tadashi Koya (小屋 禎, Koya Tadashi; born May 24, 1970) is a former Japanese football player.

== Playing career ==
Koya was born in Kanagawa Prefecture on May 24, 1970. After graduating from Aoyama Gakuin University, he joined JEF United Ichihara in 1993. He debuted in 1993 and played often as either right or left side back. However he did not play at all in 1995 and he moved to the Japan Football League club Brummell Sendai in 1996. He retired at the end of the 1996 season.

== Club statistics ==
Club performance			League		Cup		League Cup		Total	
Season	Club	League	Apps	Goals	Apps	Goals	Apps	Goals	Apps	Goals
Japan			League		Emperor's Cup		J.League Cup		Total	
1993	JEF United Ichihara	J1 League	3	0	1	0	2	0	6	0
1994	JEF United Ichihara	J1 League	21	0	2	0	0	0	23	0
1995	JEF United Ichihara	J1 League	0	0	0	0	-		0	0
1996	Brummell Sendai	Football League	10	1	0	0	-		10	1
Total			34	1	3	0	2	0	39	1
