= Kazuo Echigo =

Japanese footballer and manager

Kazuo Echigo 越後 和男
Personal information
- Full name: Kazuo Echigo
- Date of birth: December 28, 1965 (age 60)
- Place of birth: Mie District, Japan
- Height: 1.71 m (5 ft 7 1/2 in)
- Position: Midfielder

Youth career
- 1981–1983: Yokkaichi Chuo Kogyo High School

Senior career*
Years	Team	Apps	(Gls)
1984–1995	JEF United Ichihara	174	(27)
1996–1999	Vegalta Sendai	84	(13)
Total		258	(40)

International career
1986–1987	Japan	6	(1)

Managerial career
- 2017–2018: Mynavi Vegalta Sendai Ladies
- 2019–2022: Chinese Taipei women
Medal record
JEF United Ichihara
Winner	Japan Soccer League	1985/86
Winner	JSL Cup	1986
Runner-up	JSL Cup	1990
Runner-up	Emperor's Cup	1984
- * Club domestic league appearances and goals

Kazuo Echigo (越後 和男, Echigo Kazuo; born December 28, 1965) is a former Japanese football player and manager. He also played for the Japanese National Team.

== Club career ==
Echigo was born in Mie District, Mie on December 28, 1965. After graduating from high school, he joined Furukawa Electric (later JEF United Ichihara) in 1984. The club won the 1985–86 Japan Soccer League and the 1986 JSL Cup. In Asia, the club won 1986 Asian Club Championship. They were the first Japanese club to win the Asian championships. In 1995, he moved to Brummell Sendai (later Vegalta Sendai). He retired in 1999.

== National team career ==
On July 25, 1986, Echigo debuted for the Japanese National Team against Syria. He also played at 1986 Asian Games. In 1987, he was selected by Japan for 1988 Summer Olympics qualifications. He played 6 games and scored 1 goal.

== Coaching career ==
After retirement, Echigo started a coaching career at Vegalta Sendai in 2000. He served as a coach until 2004. In 2007, he signed with JEF United Chiba and became a manager for the reserve team. In 2011, he moved back to Vegalta Sendai and served as manager for the youth team. In 2017, he became a manager for the Mynavi Vegalta Sendai Ladies. In the 2017 season, the club was finished in 4th place. However in the 2018 season, the club won only 1 out of 9 matches and he resigned in June.

Echigo was appointed as the manager of Chinese Taipei women's national football team on January 19, 2019, and at the 2022 AFC Women's Asian Cup almost led the team to its first world cup since 1991.

== Club statistics ==
Club performance			League		Cup		League Cup		Total	
Season	Club	League	Apps	Goals	Apps	Goals	Apps	Goals	Apps	Goals
Japan			League		Emperor's Cup		J.League Cup		Total	
1984	Furukawa Electric	JSL Division 1	4	2	3	1	1	0	8	3
1985/86	Furukawa Electric	JSL Division 1	22	4	2	1	4	0	28	5
1986/87	Furukawa Electric	JSL Division 1	15	0	-		5	1	20	1
1987/88	Furukawa Electric	JSL Division 1	10	0	1	0	2	0	13	0
1988/89	Furukawa Electric	JSL Division 1	20	3	2	0	1	0	23	3
1989/90	Furukawa Electric	JSL Division 1	13	1	1	0	2	1	16	2
1990/91	Furukawa Electric	JSL Division 1	11	4			0	0	11	4
1991/92	Furukawa Electric	JSL Division 1	13	3			1	0	14	3
1992	JEF United Ichihara	J1 League	-		3	1	9	2	12	3
1993	JEF United Ichihara	J1 League	22	3	3	0	3	0	28	3
1994	JEF United Ichihara	J1 League	33	7	2	0	2	0	37	7
1995	JEF United Ichihara	J1 League	11	0	0	0	-		11	0
1996	Brummell Sendai	Football League	22	7	3	0	-		25	7
1997	Brummell Sendai	Football League	9	2	0	0	3	1	12	3
1998	Brummell Sendai	Football League	27	4	4	0	0	0	31	4
1999	Vegalta Sendai	J2 League	26	0	0	0	1	0	27	0
Total			258	40	24	3	34	5	316	48

== National team statistics ==
Japan national team
Year	Apps	Goals
1986	3	0
1987	3	1
Total	6	1
