= Shin Che-bon =

South Korean footballer

Personal information
- Date of birth: September 27, 1971 (age 55)
- Place of birth: Tokyo, Japan
- Height: 1.76 m (5 ft 9 1/2 in)
- Position: Striker

Senior career*
Years	Team	Apps	(Gls)
1992–1995	JEF United Ichihara	18	(1)
1995	Fujitsu		
1996–1997	Honda Luminozo Sayama		
1998–2000	Yokogawa Electric		
- * Club domestic league appearances and goals

- Shin Che-bon
- Hangul: 신재범
- Hanja: 申在範
- RR: Sin Jaebeom
- MR: Sin Chaebŏm

Shin Che-bon (born September 27, 1971) is a former South Korean football player.

== Career statistics ==
Club	Season	League			Emperor's Cup		J.League Cup		Total	
Club	Season	Division	Apps	Goals	Apps	Goals	Apps	Goals	Apps	Goals
JEF United Ichihara	1992	J1 League	—				0	0	0	0
JEF United Ichihara	1993	J1 League	7	0	1	0	0	0	8	0
JEF United Ichihara	1994	J1 League	8	1	2	0	0	0	10	1
JEF United Ichihara	1995	J1 League	3	0	0	0	—		3	0
Career total			18	1	3	0	0	0	21	1
