= Yoshikazu Goto =

Japanese footballer and manager

Yoshikazu Goto 後藤 義一
Personal information
- Full name: Yoshikazu Goto
- Date of birth: February 20, 1964 (age 62)
- Place of birth: Shizuoka, Japan
- Height: 1.70 m (5 ft 7 in)
- Position: Midfielder

Youth career
- 1979–1981: Shimizu Shogyo High School

College career
Years	Team	Apps	(Gls)
1982–1985	Chuo University		

Senior career*
Years	Team	Apps	(Gls)
1986–1995	JEF United Ichihara	220	(25)
1996–1998	Consadole Sapporo	82	(7)
1999–2003	Yokohama FC	120	(5)
Total		422	(37)

Managerial career
- 2009–2011: Arte Takasaki
Medal record
JEF United Ichihara
Winner	JSL Cup	1986
Runner-up	JSL Cup	1990
- * Club domestic league appearances and goals

Yoshikazu Goto (後藤 義一, Goto Yoshikazu; born February 20, 1964) is a former Japanese football player and manager.

== Playing career ==
Goto was born in Shizuoka Prefecture on February 20, 1964. After graduating from Chuo University, he joined Furukawa Electric (later JEF United Ichihara) in 1986. He played many matches as midfielder from first season and the club won the champions 1986 JSL Cup and 1986 Asian Club Championship. This is first Asian champions as Japanese club. He became a regular player from 1987. He played for the club in 10 seasons and also served captain from 1994. In 1996, he moved to Japan Football League club Consadole Sapporo. He played as captain and the club won the champions in 1997 and was promoted to J1 League. In 1999, he moved to new club Yokohama FC in Japan Football League. The club won the champions in 1999 and 2000 and was promoted to J2 League. He played as regular player until 2002 and retired end of 2002 season. From 2003, although he became a coach, In July, he came back as player and retired end of the season.

== Coaching career ==
After retirement, Goto started coaching career at Yokohama FC in 2003. He served coach for top team until he came back as player in July. From 2004, he became a manager for youth team until 2008. In 2009, he signed with Japan Football League club Arte Takasaki. However the club was disbanded end of 2011 season due to financial strain. He was the last manager for the club.

== Club statistics ==
Club performance			League		Cup		League Cup		Total	
Season	Club	League	Apps	Goals	Apps	Goals	Apps	Goals	Apps	Goals
Japan			League		Emperor's Cup		J.League Cup		Total	
1986/87	Furukawa Electric	JSL Division 1	11	3	-		5	1	16	4
1987/88	Furukawa Electric	JSL Division 1	19	1	4	1	0	0	23	2
1988/89	Furukawa Electric	JSL Division 1	22	2	2	0	2	0	26	2
1989/90	Furukawa Electric	JSL Division 1	22	4	1	0	2	0	25	4
1990/91	Furukawa Electric	JSL Division 1	22	2			5	0	27	2
1991/92	Furukawa Electric	JSL Division 1	21	2			1	0	22	2
1992	JEF United Ichihara	J1 League	-				9	0	9	0
1993	JEF United Ichihara	J1 League	19	2	3	0	4	0	26	0
1994	JEF United Ichihara	J1 League	36	3	2	0	2	1	40	4
1995	JEF United Ichihara	J1 League	48	6	1	0	-		49	6
1996	Consadole Sapporo	Football League	28	3	3	1	-		31	4
1997	Consadole Sapporo	Football League	29	3	3	0	8	2	40	5
1998	Consadole Sapporo	J1 League	25	1	0	0	1	0	26	1
1999	Yokohama FC	Football League	21	1	3	0	-		24	1
2000	Yokohama FC	Football League	22	3	2	0	-		24	3
2001	Yokohama FC	J2 League	42	1	4	0	4	0	50	1
2002	Yokohama FC	J2 League	32	0	2	0	-		34	0
2003	Yokohama FC	J2 League	3	0	0	0	-		3	0
Total			422	37	30	2	43	4	495	39
