= Michel Miyazawa =

Japanese footballer (born 1963)

Michel Miyazawa 宮澤 ミッシェル
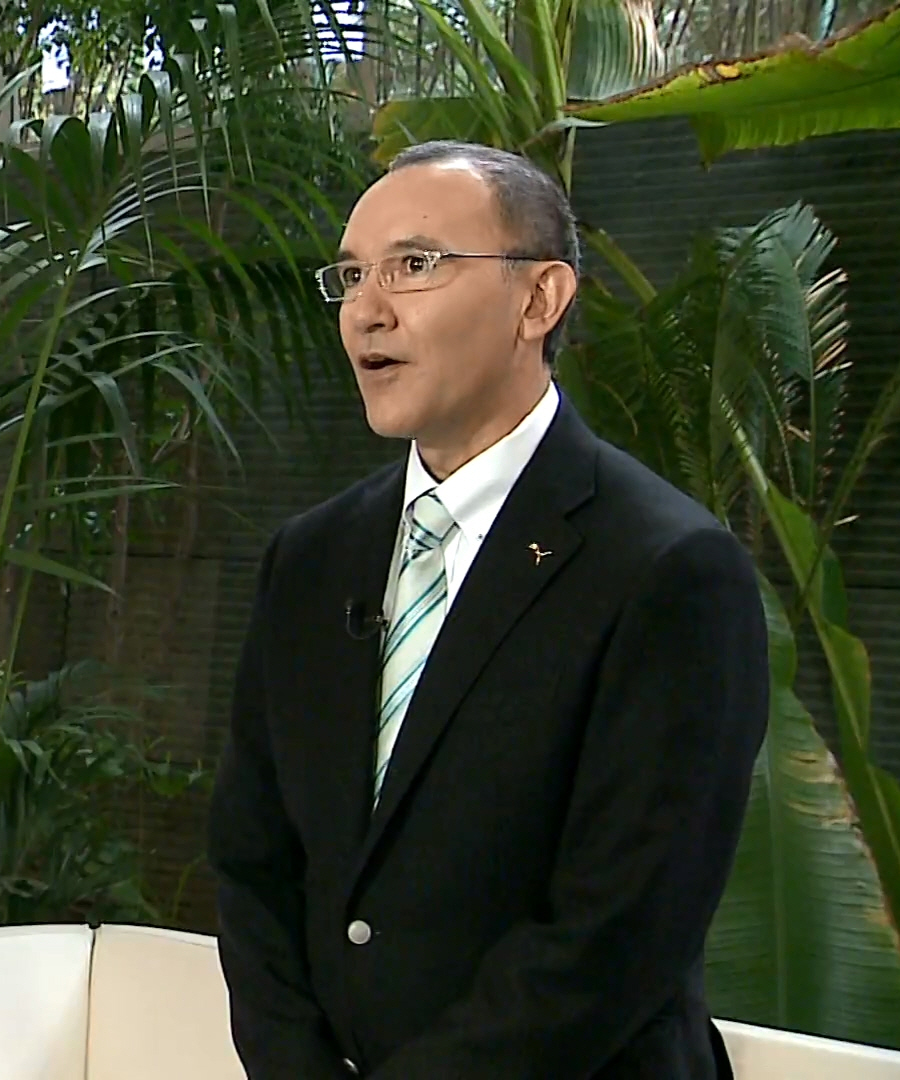
- Miyazawa in 2017

Personal information
- Full name: Michel Miyazawa
- Date of birth: July 14, 1963 (age 63)
- Place of birth: Chiba, Japan
- Height: 1.76 m (5 ft 9 1/2 in)
- Position: Defender

Youth career
- 1979–1981: Ichihara Midori High School
- 1982–1985: Kokushikan University

Senior career*
Years	Team	Apps	(Gls)
1986–1992	Fujita Industries	131	(4)
1992–1995	JEF United Ichihara	58	(2)
Total		189	(6)
Medal record
Fujita Industries
Runner-up	Emperor's Cup	1988
- * Club domestic league appearances and goals

Michel Miyazawa (宮澤 ミッシェル, Miyazawa Michel; born July 14, 1963) is a former Japanese football player. Seira Miyazawa, his daughter, is a former member of female idol group Nogizaka46.

== Playing career ==
Miyazawa was born in Chiba Prefecture on July 14, 1963. After graduating from Kokushikan University, he joined Fujita Industries in 1986. He became a regular player as center back from first season. The club won the 2nd place 1988 Emperor's Cup. In 1992, he moved to his local club JEF United Ichihara. He played many matches as center back. However his opportunity to play decreased in 1995 and he retired at the end of the 1995 season.

== Club statistics ==
Club performance			League		Cup		League Cup		Total	
Season	Club	League	Apps	Goals	Apps	Goals	Apps	Goals	Apps	Goals
Japan			League		Emperor's Cup		J.League Cup		Total	
1986/87	Fujita Industries	JSL Division 1	21	0						
1987/88	Fujita Industries	JSL Division 1	19	0						
1988/89	Fujita Industries	JSL Division 1	22	0			2	0	24	0
1989/90	Fujita Industries	JSL Division 1	10	0			3	0	13	0
1990/91	Fujita Industries	JSL Division 2	29	0			1	0	30	0
1991/92	Fujita Industries	JSL Division 2	30	4			1	0	31	4
1992	JEF United Ichihara	J1 League	-				9	0	9	0
1993	JEF United Ichihara	J1 League	19	0	0	0	4	0	23	0
1994	JEF United Ichihara	J1 League	28	2	2	0	0	0	30	2
1995	JEF United Ichihara	J1 League	11	0	0	0	-		11	0
Total			189	6	2	0	20	0	211	6
