= Goran Vasilijević =

Serbian footballer

Personal information
- Full name: Goran Vasilijević
- Date of birth: 27 August 1965 (age 61)
- Place of birth: Zemun, SFR Yugoslavia
- Height: 1.80 m (5 ft 11 in)
- Position: Defender

Senior career*
Years	Team	Apps	(Gls)
1984–1986	(Galenika) Zemun	49	(2)
1986–1988	Radnički Niš	61	(9)
1988–1994	Red Star Belgrade	87	(4)
1994	Lokomotiv Sofia	8	(1)
1995–1996	JEF United Ichihara	32	(4)
1996–1997	Lokomotiv Sofia	6	(1)
1997	Napredak Kruševac		
1998	Borac Čačak		
Total		243	(21)

International career
1986	Yugoslavia U21	1	(0)
1987	Yugoslavia Olympic	1	(0)

Managerial career
- 2002: Obilić
- * Club domestic league appearances and goals

Goran "Maza" Vasilijević (Serbian Cyrillic: Горан Маза Василијевић; born 27 August 1965) is a Serbian retired footballer who played as a defender.

After starting his career at Galenika Zemun and playing for Radnički Niš, Vasilijević joined Red Star Belgrade in the summer of 1988. He was a member of the team that won the European Cup in 1991. In the mid-1990s, Vasilijević also played abroad in Bulgaria and Japan.

In 2002, Vasilijević briefly served as manager of Obilić.

== Honours ==
Red Star Belgrade

- Yugoslav First League: 1990–91, 1991–92
- FR Yugoslavia Cup: 1992–93
- European Cup: 1990–91
- Intercontinental Cup: 1991
