= Zoran Petrović (referee) =

Serbian football referee (1952–2024)

- Born: 10 April 1952; Belgrade, PR Serbia, FPR Yugoslavia
- Died: 8 August 2024 (aged 72)
- Other occupation: Engineer

Domestic
Years	League	Role
1982–1997	Yugoslav First League	Referee

International
Years	League	Role
1983–1997	FIFA–listed	Referee

Zoran Petrović (Serbian Cyrillic: Зоран Петровић; 10 April 1952 – 8 August 2024) was a Serbian football referee.

== Career ==
=== FIFA World Cup ===
At the FIFA World Cup, Petrović refereed a total of four matches and served as linesman in two other matches.

At the 1986 World Cup in Mexico, he was the main referee in the Iraq vs. Mexico group stage match, as well as in the Morocco vs. West Germany round of 16 contest.

At the 1990 World Cup in Italy, Petrović was the main referee in the England vs. Netherlands group stage match, as well as in the Sweden vs. Costa Rica group stage match. At the same tournament he performed linesman duties at two more matches - the group stage match Austria vs. United States as well as the round of 16 contest Italy vs. Uruguay.

Furthermore, Petrović refereed the 1992 UEFA Cup Final return leg match at Amsterdam's Olympic Stadium that saw Ajax take on Torino Calcio.

=== J.League ===
After refereeing at two World Cups, Zoran Petrović signed a professional contract with the Japan Football Association. He refereed matches in Japan's J. League from 1994 until 1997, with the added task of passing his experience and knowledge onto upstart Japanese referees being stipulated as one of his contractual obligations in the country. He won two Best Referee Awards, in 1994 and 1996.

== Death ==
Petrović died on 8 August 2024, at the age of 72.
