= 康平 =

康平 may refer to:

- Kangping, Liaoning Province, China
- Kangping, Jiangcheng County, Yunnan Province, China
- Kōhei, Japanese era name
- Kōhei (given name), Japanese given name

== See also ==
- The dictionary definition of 康 at Wiktionary
- The dictionary definition of 平 at Wiktionary
