= 高平 =

高平 may refer to:

== People ==
- Takahira, a Japanese surname
- Kōhei (given name), a Japanese masculine given name
- Gao Ping (born 1970), Chinese composer

== Places ==
- Gaoping, a city in Shanxi, China
- Cao Bằng Province, a province in northern Vietnam
- Cao Bằng, the capital of Cao Bằng Province
