= Menglie =

Menglie Town
- Town
- 勐烈镇
- Location in Yunnan.
- Coordinates: 22°35′00″N 101°51′58″E
- Country: People's Republic of China
- Province: Yunnan
- Prefecture-level city: Pu'er City
- Autonomous county: Jiangcheng Hani and Yi Autonomous County
- Designated (town): 2005

Area
  - Total: 387.67 km^{2} (149.68 sq mi)

Population (2017)
  - Total: 32,032
  - Density: 82.627/km^{2} (214.00/sq mi)
- Time zone: UTC+08:00 (China Standard)
- Postal code: 665900
- Area code: 0879

Menglie (simplified Chinese: 勐烈镇; traditional Chinese: 勐烈鎮; pinyin: Mèngliè Zhèn) is a town in Jiangcheng Hani and Yi Autonomous County, Yunnan, China. As of the 2017 census it had a population of 32,032 and an area of 387.67 square kilometres (149.68 sq mi). It is the political, economic and cultural center of Jiangcheng Hani and Yi Autonomous County.

== Etymology ==
"Menglie" is a Dai place name, which means plain by a river. "Meng" means plain and "Lie" means river.

== Administrative division ==
As of 2016, the town is divided into two communities and seven villages:

- Dongcheng Community (东城社区)
- Xicheng Community (西城社区)
- Hongjiang (红疆村)
- Daxin (大新村)
- Duoba (朵把村)
- Jiangbian (江边村)
- Qiaotou (桥头村)
- Dazhai (大寨村)
- Niuluohe (牛倮河村)

== History ==
In 1902, the region came under the jurisdiction of Menglie Suppress Committee (勐烈弹压委员会).

The town was formed in February 1983. In December 2005, Hongjiang Township (红疆乡) was merged into Menglie Town.

== Geography ==
It lies at the southeastern of Jiangcheng Hani and Yi Autonomous County, bordering Kangping Town to the west, Laos to the south, Guoqing Township and Baozang Town to the north, and Qushui Town to the east.

The highest point in the town is Mount Luoguo (锣锅山) which stands 1,804 metres (5,919 ft) above sea level. The lowest point is the river valley of Mengye River (勐野江河谷), which, at 800 metres (2,600 ft) above sea level.

The town experiences a subtropical monsoon humid climate, with an average annual temperature of 18 °C (64 °F), and total annual rainfall of 2,254-millimetre (88.7 in). Flood in summer and drought in winter and spring.

The Mengye River (勐野河), Niuluo River (牛洛河), Menglie River (勐烈河), Dazhai River (大寨河), Wuma River (乌马河) and Lahu River (腊户河) flow through the town.

The Menglie Reservoir (勐烈水库) is a reservoir located in the town.

== Economy ==
The economy is supported primarily by farming and ranching. Tea, sugarcane, peanut, vegetable, fruit are the economic plants of this region. The region abounds with coal, iron, copper, Lead, zinc, rock salt, and plaster stone.

== Demographics ==
Population census
Year	Pop.	±%
2006	21,465	—
2017	32,032	+49.2%

As of 2017, the National Bureau of Statistics of China estimates the town's population now to be 32,032.

== Tourist attractions ==
The town boasts many cultural and historical relics, including the Menglie Lake Wetland Park (勐烈湖湿地公园), Jiangcheng Hani and Yi Autonomous County Martyrs Memorial Park, Jiangcheng Old Street, Zhenjiang Tower (镇江楼), and the Temple of Mountain Deity (山神庙)

== Transportation ==
The National Highway G219 passes across the town north to south.
