= Jiahe Township, Jiangcheng County =

Jiahe Township 嘉禾乡
- Township
- Location in Yunnan.
- Coordinates: 22°45′53″N 101°52′51″E
- Country: People's Republic of China
- Province: Yunnan
- Prefecture-level city: Pu'er City
- Autonomous county: Jiangcheng Hani and Yi Autonomous County

Area
  - Total: 531.75 km^{2} (205.31 sq mi)

Population (2017)
  - Total: 14,727
  - Density: 27.695/km^{2} (71.731/sq mi)
- Time zone: UTC+08:00 (China Standard)
- Postal code: 665999
- Area code: 0879

Jiahe Township (simplified Chinese: 嘉禾乡; traditional Chinese: 嘉禾鄉; pinyin: Jiāhé Xiāng) is a township in Jiangcheng Hani and Yi Autonomous County, Yunnan, China. As of the 2017 census it had a population of 14,727 and an area of 531.75 square kilometres (205.31 sq mi).

== Etymology ==
In Hani language, "Jiahe" means a place of hope and harvest.

== Administrative division ==
As of 2016, the township is divided into ten villages:

- Jiangxi (江西村)
- Lianhe (联合村)
- Lixian (李仙村)
- Baga (巴嘎村)
- Pingzhang (平掌村)
- Mingzishan (明子山村)
- Luosa (洛洒村)
- Gejie (隔界村)
- Nanwang (南旺村)
- Zhonghui (中会村)

== Geography ==
It lies at the northern of Jiangcheng Hani and Yi Autonomous County, bordering Baozang Town to the west, Guoqing Township to the south, Mojiang Hani Autonomous County and Lüchun County to the north, and Qushui Town to the east.

The highest point in the township is Mount Yaorenjian (瑶人尖山) which stands 2,075 metres (6,808 ft) above sea level. The lowest point is the confluence of Duo Stream and Lixian River (夺河和李仙江汇合处), which, at 360 metres (1,180 ft) above sea level.

The township enjoys a subtropical monsoon humid climate, with an average annual temperature of 18.1 °C (64.6 °F), total annual rainfall of 2,279-millimetre (89.7 in).

The Lixian River (李仙江) and Duo Stream (夺河) flow through the township.

== Economy ==
The principal industries in the area are agriculture and animal husbandry. Tea, sugarcane, and natural rubber are cash crops of the township.

== Demographics ==
Population census
| Year | Pop. | ±% |
|---|---|---|
| 2006 | 13,510 | — |
| 2017 | 14,727 | +9.0% |

As of 2017, the National Bureau of Statistics of China estimates the township's population now to be 14,727.

== Transportation ==
The township is connected to two highways: the National Highway G227 and the Provincial Highway S214.
