= Guoqing Township =

Guoqing Township 国庆乡
- Township
- Location in Yunnan.
- Coordinates: 22°38′13″N 101°52′04″E
- Country: People's Republic of China
- Province: Yunnan
- Prefecture-level city: Pu'er City
- Autonomous county: Jiangcheng Hani and Yi Autonomous County

Area
  - Total: 355.19 km^{2} (137.14 sq mi)

Population (2017)
  - Total: 13,381
  - Density: 37.673/km^{2} (97.572/sq mi)
- Time zone: UTC+08:00 (China Standard)
- Postal code: 665999
- Area code: 0879

Guoqing Township (simplified Chinese: 国庆乡; traditional Chinese: 國慶鄉; pinyin: Guóqìng Xiāng) is a township in Jiangcheng Hani and Yi Autonomous County, Yunnan, China. As of the 2017 census it had a population of 13,381 and an area of 355.19 square kilometres (137.14 sq mi).

== Administrative division ==
As of 2016, the township is divided into six villages:

- Medeng (么等村)
- Luojie (络捷村)
- Tianfang (田房村)
- Heping (和平村)
- Habo (哈播村)
- Gale (嘎勒村)

== Geography ==
The township is situated at the central Jiangcheng Hani and Yi Autonomous County. The town shares a border with Baozang Town to the west, Qushui Town to the east, Jiahe Township to the north, and Menglie Town to the south.

The township enjoys a subtropical monsoon humid climate, with an average annual temperature of 18.2 °C (64.8 °F) and total annual rainfall of 2,150-millimetre (85 in).

== Economy ==
The economy of the township has a predominantly agricultural orientation, including farming and pig-breeding. Tea and sugarcane are the economic plants of this region.

== Demographics ==
Population census
Year	Pop.	±%
2006	13,634	—
2017	13,381	−1.9%

As of 2017, the National Bureau of Statistics of China estimates the township's population now to be 13,381.

== Transportation ==
The National Highway G219 passes across the township north to south.
