= 2010–11 Eredivisie =

55th season of the Eredivisie

Eredivisie
- Season: 2010–11
- Dates: 6 August 2010 – 15 May 2011
- Champions: Ajax (30th title)
- Relegated: Willem II
- Champions League: Ajax; Twente
- Europa League: PSV; AZ; ADO Den Haag
- Matches: 306
- Goals: 987 (3.23 per match)
- Top goalscorer: Björn Vleminckx (23 goals)
- Biggest home win: PSV 10–0 Feyenoord
- Biggest away win: De Graafschap 0–5 Ajax
- Highest scoring: PSV 10–0 Feyenoord
- Longest winning run: 6 games Ajax
- Longest unbeaten run: 13 games Twente
- Longest winless run: 19 games Willem II
- Longest losing run: 7 games Willem II
- Total attendance: 5,639,460
- Average attendance: 19,116

The 2010–11 Eredivisie is the 55th season of Eredivisie since its establishment in 1955. It began on 6 August 2010 with the first matches of the season and ended on 29 May 2011 with the last matches of the European competition and relegation playoffs. FC Twente were the reigning champions, having won their first Dutch championship the previous season. A total of 18 teams took part in the league. Ajax won their 30th title after beating FC Twente 3–1 on 15 May 2011.

== Teams ==
RKC Waalwijk were directly relegated to the 2010–11 Eerste Divisie at the end of last season after finishing the season at the bottom of the table, ending one season at the highest division of Dutch football. They were replaced by 2009–10 Eerste Divisie champions De Graafschap, who return to the Eredivisie after one season.

Sparta Rotterdam were also relegated at the end of the promotion/relegation playoff tournament, as they lost their two-legged play-off against city rivals Excelsior on away goals. Sparta hence completed a 5-year stint in the league, while Excelsior played for the first time at the top level in 2 years. In contrast, Willem II retained their Eredivisie spot after beating Go Ahead Eagles after extra time of the return leg.

Locations of the 2010–11 Eredivisie teams
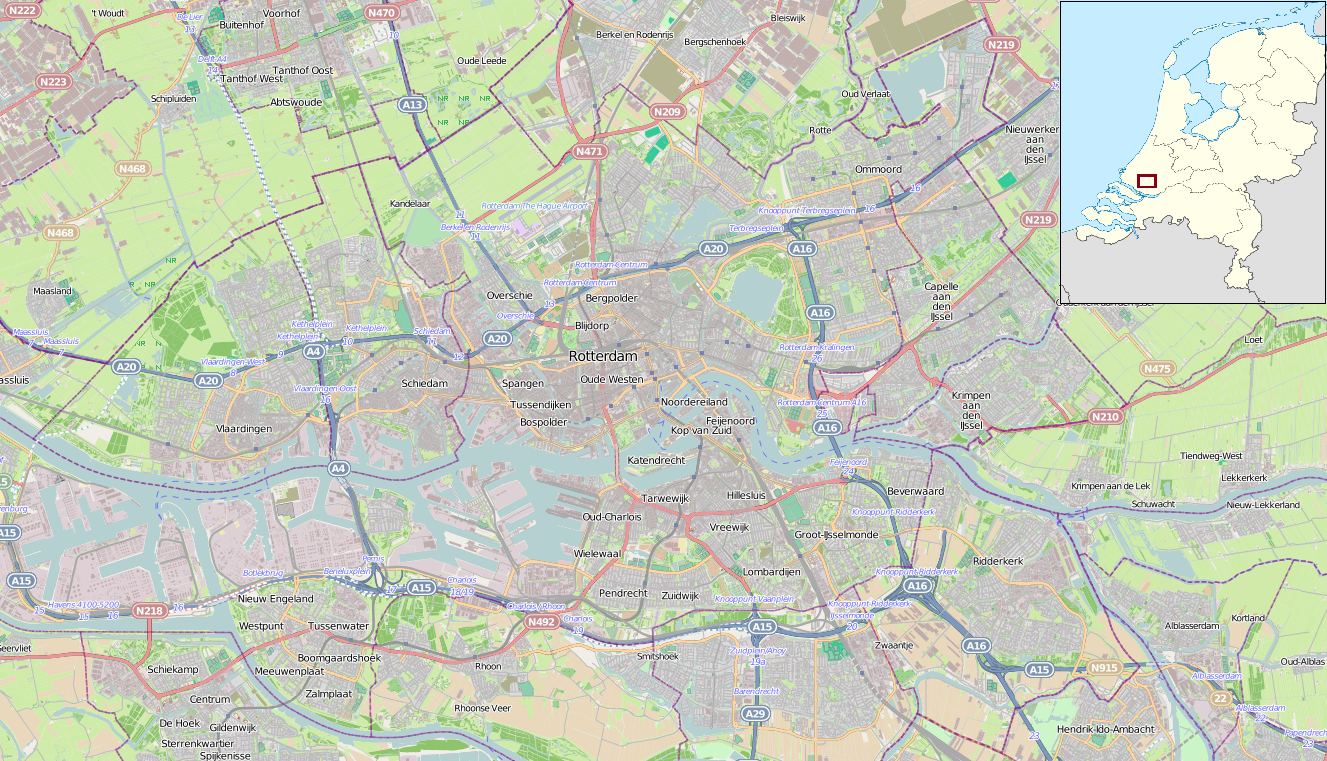
Rotterdam Eredivisie football clubs

Club	Location	Kit maker	Shirt Sponsor	Venue	Capacity
ADO Den Haag	The Hague	Hummel	Fit For Free Fitnesscentra	Kyocera Stadion	15,000
Ajax	Amsterdam	Adidas	Aegon	Amsterdam ArenA	52,960
AZ	Alkmaar	Quick	Afas Software	AZ Stadion	17,150
Excelsior	Rotterdam	Masita	DSW Zorgverzekeraar	Woudestein	3,527
Feyenoord	Rotterdam	Puma	ASR	Stadion Feijenoord	48,750
De Graafschap	Doetinchem	kwd	Centric	De Vijverberg	12,600
Groningen	Groningen	Klupp	Noordlease	Euroborg	22,700
Heerenveen	Heerenveen	Jako	Unive	Abe Lenstra Stadion	27,000
Heracles Almelo	Almelo	Jako	Ten Cate	Polman Stadion	8,500
NAC Breda	Breda	Klupp	Sunweb Vakanties	Rat Verlegh Stadion	19,000
NEC	Nijmegen	Nike	Curaçao	Stadion de Goffert	12,470
PSV	Eindhoven	Nike	Philips	Philips Stadion	35,250
Roda JC	Kerkrade	Diadora	Accon AVM	Parkstad Limburg Stadion	19,500
Twente	Enschede	Diadora	Arke	De Grolsch Veste	30,100
Utrecht	Utrecht	Kappa	Phanos (since March); Bank of Scotland	Stadion Galgenwaard	24,426
Vitesse Arnhem	Arnhem	Klupp	Afab	GelreDome	28,000
VVV-Venlo	Venlo	Masita	Seacon	De Koel	8,000
Willem II	Tilburg	Masita	Pondres	Koning Willem II Stadion	14,637

=== Managerial changes ===
Team	Outgoing head coach	Manner of departure	Date of vacancy	Position in table	Incoming head coach	Date of appointment	Position in table
FC Groningen	(Netherlands) Ron Jans	End of contract	1 July 2010	Pre-season	(Netherlands) Pieter Huistra	1 July 2010	Pre-season
SC Heerenveen	(Netherlands) Jan Everse	End of contract	1 July 2010	Pre-season	(Netherlands) Ron Jans	1 July 2010	Pre-season
AZ	(Netherlands) Dick Advocaat	Signed by Russia	1 July 2010	Pre-season	(Netherlands) Gertjan Verbeek	1 July 2010	Pre-season
Heracles Almelo	(Netherlands) Gertjan Verbeek	Signed by AZ	1 July 2010	Pre-season	(Netherlands) Peter Bosz	1 July 2010	Pre-season
FC Twente	(England) Steve McClaren	Signed by VfL Wolfsburg	1 July 2010	Pre-season	(Belgium) Michel Preud'homme	1 July 2010	Pre-season
ADO Den Haag	(Netherlands) Maurice Steijn	End of caretaker spell	1 July 2010	Pre-season	(Netherlands) John van den Brom	1 July 2010	Pre-season
Willem II	(Netherlands) Theo de Jong	End of caretaker spell	1 July 2010	Pre-season	(Netherlands) Gert Heerkes	1 July 2010	Pre-season
NAC Breda	(Netherlands) Robert Maaskant	Signed by Wisła Kraków	21 August 2010	17th	(Netherlands) John Karelse, (Netherlands) Gert Aandewiel, (Netherlands) Arno van Zwam	21 August 2010	13th
Vitesse Arnhem	(Netherlands) Theo Bos	Sacked	21 October 2010	16th	(Spain) Albert Ferrer	27 October 2010	15th
Ajax	(Netherlands) Martin Jol	Resigned	6 December 2010	4th	(Netherlands) Frank de Boer	6 December 2010	1st
VVV-Venlo	(Netherlands) Jan van Dijk	Sacked	20 December 2010	17th	(Netherlands) Willy Boessen	12 January 2011	17th
Willem II	(Netherlands) Gert Heerkes	Contract disbanded	15 April 2011	18th	(Netherlands) John Feskens	15 April 2011	18th

== League table ==
Pos	Team	Pld	W	D	L	GF	GA	GD	Pts	Qualification or relegation
1	Ajax (C)	34	22	7	5	72	30	+42	73	Qualification to Champions League group stage
2	Twente	34	21	8	5	65	34	+31	71	Qualification to Champions League third qualifying round
3	PSV	34	20	9	5	79	34	+45	69	Qualification to Europa League play-off round (Note: Since both 2010–11 KNVB Cup finalists, Twente and Ajax, qualified for the Champions League, allocation of the 2011–12 UEFA Europa League spots was based upon the final league standings, with the cup-winners spot going to the third-placed team and the regular spots available through league placement awarded to the next best teams below.)
4	AZ	34	17	8	9	55	44	+11	59	Qualification to Europa League third qualifying round
5	Groningen	34	17	6	11	65	52	+13	57	Qualification to European competition play-offs
6	Roda JC	34	14	13	7	65	50	+15	55	Qualification to European competition play-offs
7	ADO Den Haag (O)	34	16	6	12	63	55	+8	54	Qualification to European competition play-offs
8	Heracles	34	14	7	13	65	56	+9	49	Qualification to European competition play-offs
9	Utrecht	34	13	8	13	55	51	+4	47	
10	Feyenoord	34	12	8	14	53	54	−1	44	
11	NEC	34	10	13	11	57	56	+1	43	
12	Heerenveen	34	10	11	13	60	54	+6	41	
13	NAC Breda (Note: NAC Breda were docked 1 point because they were late with payment obligations to Contractspelers Fonds KNVB (CFK).)	34	12	5	17	44	60	−16	40	
14	De Graafschap	34	9	11	14	31	56	−25	38	
15	Vitesse Arnhem	34	9	8	17	42	61	−19	35	
16	Excelsior (O)	34	10	5	19	45	66	−21	35	Qualification to relegation play-offs
17	VVV-Venlo (O)	34	6	3	25	34	76	−42	21	Qualification to relegation play-offs
18	Willem II (R)	34	3	6	25	37	98	−61	15	Relegation to Eerste Divisie

Source: eredivisie.nl (in Dutch)
Rules for classification: 1) points; 2) goal difference; 3) number of goals scored.
(C) Champions; (O) Play-off winners; (R) Relegated

== Results ==
Home \ Away	ADO	AJX	AZ	EXC	FEY	GRA	GRO	HEE	HER	NAC	NEC	PSV	RJC	TWE	UTR	VIT	VVV	WIL
ADO Den Haag		3–2	0–2	2–1	2–2	2–2	2–4	3–1	3–2	3–0	5–1	2–2	1–3	1–2	1–0	1–0	3–0	2–1
Ajax	0–1		4–0	4–1	2–0	2–0	2–0	3–1	3–0	3–0	1–1	0–0	3–0	3–1	1–2	4–2	1–0	2–0
AZ	3–1	2–0		1–1	2–1	5–1	1–1	2–2	2–1	1–1	2–2	0–4	1–2	2–1	1–0	3–1	6–1	3–0
Excelsior	1–5	2–2	2–1		3–2	0–0	2–2	0–2	2–1	1–3	4–2	2–3	1–2	0–2	3–1	0–2	1–0	4–0
Feyenoord	2–1	1–2	0–1	1–0		0–1	5–1	2–2	2–1	2–1	1–1	3–1	1–1	0–1	3–1	4–0	3–0	6–1
De Graafschap	1–0	0–5	2–1	3–0	1–1		1–1	3–2	1–1	1–3	1–4	0–0	3–1	1–1	0–0	1–1	1–0	2–1
Groningen	3–1	2–2	2–0	2–0	2–0	2–1		1–0	1–4	2–1	3–1	0–0	1–4	1–2	1–0	4–1	3–2	7–1
Heerenveen	0–0	1–2	0–2	2–3	0–1	4–0	1–4		3–2	3–1	0–0	1–3	2–2	6–2	3–0	2–1	2–0	5–0
Heracles	3–0	1–4	0–0	4–1	1–1	2–0	3–0	4–2		4–1	3–2	0–2	1–0	0–0	2–1	6–1	2–2	3–0
NAC Breda	3–2	0–3	1–1	1–2	2–0	2–0	0–1	0–2	1–2		2–0	4–2	1–2	2–1	3–1	1–1	2–0	2–1
N.E.C. (football club)	1–1	1–2	0–1	2–0	3–0	1–0	3–2	2–2	1–1	2–2		2–2	5–0	2–4	1–1	0–0	1–0	3–1
PSV Eindhoven	0–1	0–0	3–1	4–2	10–0	6–0	1–1	2–2	5–2	4–1	3–1		3–1	0–1	1–0	2–1	3–0	2–1
Roda JC	1–1	2–2	1–2	3–0	3–0	1–1	1–0	0–0	4–2	5–1	1–1	0–0		0–0	1–1	4–1	5–2	2–2
Twente	3–2	2–2	1–2	2–1	2–1	2–0	4–2	0–0	5–0	2–0	1–1	2–0	1–1		4–0	1–0	2–1	4–0
Utrecht	2–3	3–0	5–1	2–0	0–4	2–2	1–0	2–1	1–1	3–1	4–0	1–2	1–1	1–1		4–2	3–2	3–0
Vitesse Arnhem	3–1	0–1	1–1	1–4	1–1	2–0	2–1	1–1	2–0	0–0	2–1	0–2	5–2	0–3	1–4		2–0	0–0
VVV-Venlo	2–3	0–2	0–1	1–0	3–2	1–0	3–5	2–2	1–0	3–0	1–4	0–3	0–4	1–2	1–2	1–5		0–0
Willem II	2–4	1–3	2–1	1–1	1–1	0–1	0–3	4–3	2–6	0–1	3–5	2–4	4–5	1–3	3–3	1–0	1–4	

Source: news.bbc.co.uk
Legend: Blue = home team win; Yellow = draw; Red = away team win.

== Play-offs ==
=== European competition ===
The teams placed fifth through eighth compete in a play-off tournament for one spot in the second qualifying round of the 2011–12 UEFA Europa League.

==== Semi-finals ====
Team 1	Agg.	Team 2	1st leg	2nd leg
Heracles	4–4 (a)	Groningen	3–2	1–2
ADO Den Haag	6–3	Roda JC	4–2	2–1

==== Finals ====
Team 1	Agg.	Team 2	1st leg	2nd leg
ADO Den Haag	6–6 (p. 4–3)	FC Groningen	5–1	1–5

=== Relegation ===
Excelsior and VVV-Venlo joined the Eerste Divisie-teams for the playoffs, after finishing 16th and 17th in the Eredivisie.

==== Round 1 ====
Team 1	Agg.	Team 2	1st leg	2nd leg
Volendam	5–2	MVV	3–2	2–0
Go Ahead Eagles	1–3	Den Bosch	0–1	1–2

==== Round 2 ====
Team 1	Agg.	Team 2	1st leg	2nd leg
Volendam	1−4	VVV-Venlo	1−2	0−2
Cambuur	3−3 (p. 6–7)	Zwolle	2−1	1−2
Veendam	3−4	Helmond Sport	3−3	0−1
Den Bosch	4−6	Excelsior	3−3	1−3

==== Round 3 ====
Team 1	Agg.	Team 2	1st leg	2nd leg
Zwolle	3–4	VVV-Venlo	1−2	2–2
Helmond Sport	3−9	Excelsior	1−5	2−4

VVV-Venlo and Excelsior will play in 2011–12 Eredivisie.

== Top goalscorers ==
Source: Eredivisie (official site) (in Dutch), Soccerway, ESPN Soccernet

Pos.	Player	Club	Goals
1	(Belgium) Björn Vleminckx	NEC	23
2	(Russia) Dmitri Bulykin	ADO	21
3	(Denmark) Mads Junker	Roda JC	20
4	(Slovenia) Tim Matavž	Groningen	16
4	(Hungary) Balázs Dzsudzsák	PSV	16
6	(Iceland) Kolbeinn Sigþórsson	AZ	15
6	(Netherlands) Luc Castaignos	Feyenoord	15
6	(Brazil) Everton	Heracles	15
6	(Sweden) Ola Toivonen	PSV	15
6	(Netherlands) Ricky van Wolfswinkel	Utrecht	15

== Attendances ==
No.	Club	Average	Change	Highest
1	AFC Ajax	47,316	-2,9%	51,738
2	Feyenoord	42,559	-3,3%	47,500
3	PSV	33,494	-0,3%	34,400
4	sc Heerenveen	25,800	0,4%	26,100
5	FC Twente	23,803	0,7%	24,200
6	FC Groningen	21,909	0,4%	22,990
7	FC Utrecht	20,085	-4,8%	24,500
8	NAC Breda	18,408	11,1%	19,000
9	AZ	16,345	-1,0%	16,851
10	SBV Vitesse	15,081	-11,2%	20,860
11	Roda JC	14,325	-3,1%	18,936
12	ADO Den Haag	13,172	12,1%	15,000
13	NEC	12,291	-0,6%	12,500
14	De Graafschap	11,972	14,1%	12,580
15	Willem II	11,421	-10,9%	13,500
16	Heracles Almelo	8,462	0,0%	8,500
17	VVV-Venlo	7,571	1,4%	8,000
18	SBV Excelsior	3,321	70,4%	3,624
