= 1453–1821: The Coming of Liberation =

2008 turn-based strategy video game

1453–1821: Η Ώρα της Απελευθέρωσης
- PC box cover
- Developer(s): S.D.S. Game Studios
- Publisher(s): Centric Multimedia
- Programmer(s): Anargyros Prosilis
- Artist(s): Anargyros Chatzitofis
- Writer(s): Panagotis Papathanasiou
- Composer(s): Georgios Papas
- Engine: Proprietary
- Platform(s): Microsoft Windows
- Release: EU: May 9, 2008
- Genre(s): Real-time strategy, Turn-based strategy
- Mode(s): Single-player

1453–1821: The Coming of Liberation (Greek: 1453–1821: Η Ώρα της Απελευθέρωσης) is a real-time strategy video game developed by Greek game developer S.D.S. Game Studios and published by Centric Multimedia. Released in 2008 for Microsoft Windows, it is the first Greek real-time strategy video game to receive a physical retail release.

The game is set during the Greek War of Independence waged by Greek revolutionaries against the Ottoman Empire between 1821 and 1830. Players assume command over the Greek forces aiming to liberate 20 Ottoman-held territories in the Peloponnese and Central Greece. Development of The Coming of Liberation began in August 2006 and was completed in May 2008 by a team of four people. After its release in 2008, the game became a best-seller for several months in both Greece and Cyprus having sold over 7,000 units in those countries.

== Gameplay ==
1453–1821: The Coming of Liberation combines elements of both turn-based and real-time strategy games, where the player takes control of Greek troops and decides how to strategically place them before battle. Troop placement is followed by a real-time battle phase, where players maneuver the units under their control in hopes of eliminating the enemy.

The game's map is divided into 20 territories, corresponding to districts in the Peloponnese and Central Greece. Each region has its own characteristics, such as population, guard, available men for military equipment and level of trade. The goal of the game is to liberate all territories within the allotted time. As the game closely follows historical facts, each round takes place during pre-specified points in time between 1821 and 1830. This means time progression can vary from one day to several years between rounds, depending on the historical developments of that time.

== Development ==
Development of The Coming of Liberation began in August 2006 when cousins Anargyros Prosilis and Anargyros Chatzitofis, both university freshmen at the time, set up S.D.S. Game Studios and began working on their own strategy game, as both were huge fans of the genre. After one year of work, they decided to show the game to friends and acquaintances, gathering feedback, comments and remarks. As they moved forward, the scope of the project grew larger, and the decision was made to release the game commercially. This was followed by an expansion of the creative team with Georgios Papas as a music composer for the game, and writer Panagotis Papathanasiou to flesh out the game's story.

Nearing completion at the end of February 2008, S.D.S. reached an agreement with Centric Multimedia to handle the publishing and distribution of The Coming of Liberation. The game received an official retail release on May 9, 2008.

== Sales ==
Following its release, The Coming of Liberation became a best seller in both the Greek and Cypriot markets, with reported significantly larger sales numbers than foreign games for several months. It is estimated that more than 7,000 copies of the game were sold, mainly in Greece and Cyprus, as well as a small amount of units sold abroad, mostly by the Greek and Greek-speaking community.
