= 1999 JEF United Ichihara season =

Football season

JEF United Ichihara
1999 season
- Manager: Gert Engels; Nicolae Zamfir
- Stadium: Ichihara Seaside Stadium
- J.League 1: 13th
- Emperor's Cup: 3rd Round
- J.League Cup: 2nd Round
- Top goalscorer: Baron (17)
Home colours	Away colours

The 1999 JEF United Ichihara season saw another poor showing from the Dogs during a period where they routinely battled against relegation.

== Competitions ==
Competitions	Position
J.League 1	13th / 16 clubs
Emperor's Cup	3rd round
J.League Cup	2nd round

== Domestic results ==
=== J.League 1 ===
6 March 1999 1-1	Kashima Antlers	4-0	JEF United Ichihara	Tokyo National Stadium
JST (UTC+09)

13 March 1999 1-2	JEF United Ichihara	0-0 (GG) (a.e.t.)	Urawa Red Diamonds	Ichihara Seaside Stadium
JST (UTC+09)

20 March 1999 1-3	Nagoya Grampus Eight	0-0 (GG) (a.e.t.)	JEF United Ichihara	Mizuho Athletic Stadium
JST (UTC+09)

27 March 1999 1-4	JEF United Ichihara	3-2 (GG) (a.e.t.)	Gamba Osaka	Ichihara Seaside Stadium
JST (UTC+09)

3 April 1999 1-5	JEF United Ichihara	1-3	Avispa Fukuoka	Ichihara Seaside Stadium
JST (UTC+09)

10 April 1999 1-6	Vissel Kobe	4-3 (GG) (a.e.t.)	JEF United Ichihara	Kobe Universiade Memorial Stadium
JST (UTC+09)

17 April 1999 1-7	JEF United Ichihara	0-2	Sanfrecce Hiroshima	Ichihara Seaside Stadium
JST (UTC+09)

24 April 1999 1-8	Verdy Kawasaki	1-0	JEF United Ichihara	Todoroki Athletics Stadium
JST (UTC+09)

28 April 1999 1-9	JEF United Ichihara	2-1	Bellmare Hiratsuka	Ichihara Seaside Stadium
JST (UTC+09)

1 May 1999 1-10	Kyoto Purple Sanga	2-3 (GG) (a.e.t.)	JEF United Ichihara	Nishikyogoku Athletic Stadium
JST (UTC+09)

5 May 1999 1-11	JEF United Ichihara	2-5	Kashiwa Reysol	Ichihara Seaside Stadium
JST (UTC+09)

8 May 1999 1-12	Yokohama F. Marinos	4-1	JEF United Ichihara	International Stadium Yokohama
JST (UTC+09)

15 May 1999 1-13	JEF United Ichihara	2-3	Shimizu S-Pulse	Ichihara Seaside Stadium
JST (UTC+09)

22 May 1999 1-14	Cerezo Osaka	2-0	JEF United Ichihara	Osaka Nagai Stadium
JST (UTC+09)

29 May 1999 1-15	JEF United Ichihara	2-1	Júbilo Iwata	Ichihara Seaside Stadium
JST (UTC+09)

7 August 1999 2-1	Sanfrecce Hiroshima	2-1	JEF United Ichihara	Hiroshima Stadium
JST (UTC+09)

14 August 1999 2-2	JEF United Ichihara	3-4 (GG) (a.e.t.)	Verdy Kawasaki	Ichihara Seaside Stadium
JST (UTC+09)

18 August 1999 2-3	Bellmare Hiratsuka	1-2	JEF United Ichihara	Hiratsuka Athletics Stadium
JST (UTC+09)

21 August 1999 2-4	JEF United Ichihara	2-1 (GG) (a.e.t.)	Kyoto Purple Sanga	Ichihara Seaside Stadium
JST (UTC+09)

28 August 1999 2-5	Kashiwa Reysol	2-0	JEF United Ichihara	Hitachi Kashiwa Soccer Stadium
JST (UTC+09)

4 September 1999 2-6	JEF United Ichihara	2-3 (GG) (a.e.t.)	Yokohama F. Marinos	Ichihara Seaside Stadium
JST (UTC+09)

11 September 1999 2-7	Shimizu S-Pulse	2-1 (GG) (a.e.t.)	JEF United Ichihara	Nihondaira Sports Stadium
JST (UTC+09)

15 September 1999 2-8	JEF United Ichihara	2-0	Cerezo Osaka	Ichihara Seaside Stadium
JST (UTC+09)

18 September 1999 2-9	Júbilo Iwata	1-2 (GG) (a.e.t.)	JEF United Ichihara	Júbilo Iwata Stadium
JST (UTC+09)

23 September 1999 2-10	JEF United Ichihara	0-2	Kashima Antlers	Tokyo National Stadium
JST (UTC+09)

30 October 1999 2-11	JEF United Ichihara	1-2	Nagoya Grampus Eight	Ichihara Seaside Stadium
JST (UTC+09)

17 November 1999 2-12	Urawa Red Diamonds	1-0	JEF United Ichihara	Urawa Komaba Stadium
JST (UTC+09)

20 November 1999 2-13	JEF United Ichihara	0-1	Vissel Kobe	Ichihara Seaside Stadium
JST (UTC+09)

23 November 1999 2-14	Avispa Fukuoka	0-5	JEF United Ichihara	Hakatanomori Football Stadium
JST (UTC+09)

27 November 1999 2-15	Gamba Osaka	0-1	JEF United Ichihara	Osaka Expo '70 Stadium
JST (UTC+09)

=== Emperor's Cup ===
1st Round	bye

2nd Round	bye

12 December 1999 3rd Round	JEF United Ichihara	2-3	Kawasaki Frontale	Ichihara Seaside Stadium
JST (UTC+09)

=== J.League Cup ===
1st Round	bye

12 June 1999 2nd Round-1	FC Tokyo	1-2	JEF United Ichihara	Nishigaoka Soccer Stadium
JST (UTC+09)

19 June 1999 2nd Round-2	JEF United Ichihara	1-4 (3-5 agg.)	FC Tokyo	Ichihara Seaside Stadium
JST (UTC+09)

== Player statistics ==
No.	Pos.	Nat.	Player	D.o.B. (Age)	Height / Weight	J.League 1		Emperor's Cup		J.League Cup		Total	
No.	Pos.	Nat.	Player	D.o.B. (Age)	Height / Weight	Apps	Goals	Apps	Goals	Apps	Goals	Apps	Goals
1	GK	(Japan)	Kenichi Shimokawa	May 14, 1970 (aged 28)	cm / kg	30	0						
2	DF	(Japan)	Eisuke Nakanishi	June 23, 1973 (aged 25)	cm / kg	26	9						
3	DF	(Japan)	Ichizo Nakata	April 19, 1973 (aged 25)	cm / kg	21	0						
4	DF	(Japan)	Takayuki Chano	November 23, 1976 (aged 22)	cm / kg	27	0						
5	DF	(Japan)	Satoshi Yamaguchi	April 17, 1978 (aged 20)	cm / kg	29	0						
6	MF	(Japan)	Tomoyuki Sakai	June 29, 1979 (aged 19)	cm / kg	22	0						
7	MF	(Japan)	Shinichi Muto	April 2, 1973 (aged 25)	cm / kg	15	1						
8	MF	(Japan)	Yoshikazu Nonomura	May 8, 1972 (aged 26)	cm / kg	9	1						
9	FW	(Japan)	Nobuhiro Takeda	May 10, 1967 (aged 31)	cm / kg	24	6						
10	FW	(Brazil)	Baron	January 19, 1974 (aged 25)	cm / kg	28	17						
11	MF	(Japan)	Nozomi Hiroyama	May 6, 1977 (aged 21)	cm / kg	30	2						
12	GK	(Japan)	Tomonori Tateishi	April 22, 1974 (aged 24)	cm / kg	0	0						
13	MF	(Japan)	Hirotoshi Yokoyama	May 9, 1975 (aged 23)	cm / kg	16	0						
14	DF	(Japan)	Kazuhiro Suzuki	November 16, 1976 (aged 22)	cm / kg	8	0						
15	MF	(Japan)	Yoshito Terakawa	September 6, 1974 (aged 24)	cm / kg	19	1						
16	FW		Terumasa Kin	November 19, 1975 (aged 23)	cm / kg	0	0						
17	GK	(Japan)	Ryo Kushino	March 3, 1979 (aged 20)	cm / kg	0	0						
18	DF	(Japan)	Katsushi Kurihara	July 29, 1977 (aged 21)	cm / kg	11	0						
19	MF	(Japan)	Shinji Murai	December 1, 1979 (aged 19)	cm / kg	1	0						
20	FW	(Japan)	Ryohei Nishiwaki	August 1, 1979 (aged 19)	cm / kg	2	0						
21	GK	(Japan)	Yoshihito Suzuki	July 11, 1980 (aged 18)	cm / kg	0	0						
22	DF	(Japan)	Yuki Inoue	October 31, 1977 (aged 21)	cm / kg	7	0						
23	DF	(Japan)	Kohei Inoue	October 5, 1978 (aged 20)	cm / kg	0	0						
24	FW	(Japan)	Takuma Sugano	April 5, 1980 (aged 18)	cm / kg	0	0						
25	FW	(Japan)	Takenori Hayashi	October 14, 1980 (aged 18)	cm / kg	17	1						
26	MF	(Japan)	Kohei Uchida	April 15, 1980 (aged 18)	cm / kg	0	0						
27	MF	(Brazil)	Paulo Henrique	February 21, 1972 (aged 27)	cm / kg	15	1						
27	MF	(Romania)	Robert Vancea	September 28, 1976 (aged 22)	cm / kg	12	0						
28	DF	(Japan)	Hideomi Yamamoto	June 26, 1980 (aged 18)	cm / kg	0	0						
29	MF	(Japan)	Yuki Abe	September 6, 1981 (aged 17)	cm / kg	30	1						
30	GK	(Japan)	Hiroki Nakamura	April 7, 1974 (aged 24)	cm / kg	0	0						
31	MF	(Netherlands)	Peter Bosz	November 21, 1963 (aged 35)	cm / kg	11	0						
32	DF	(Paraguay)	Roberto Blanco	April 17, 1980 (aged 18)	cm / kg	0	0						

== Other pages ==
- (in Japanese) J.League official site
