= 1998 JEF United Ichihara season =

JEF United Ichihara
1998 season
- Manager: Jan Versleijen
- Stadium: Ichihara Seaside Stadium
- J.League: 16th
- Emperor's Cup: 3rd Round
- J.League Cup: Runners-up
- Top goalscorer: Nobuhiro Takeda (13)
Home colours	Away colours

1998 JEF United Ichihara season

== Competitions ==
Competitions	Position
J.League	16th / 18 clubs
Emperor's Cup	3rd round
J.League Cup	Runners-up

== Domestic results ==
=== J.League ===
21 March 1998 1-1	Urawa Red Diamonds	3-2	JEF United Ichihara	Urawa Komaba Stadium
JST (UTC+09)

25 March 1998 1-2	JEF United Ichihara	1-2	Nagoya Grampus Eight	Ichihara Seaside Stadium
JST (UTC+09)

28 March 1998 1-3	Bellmare Hiratsuka	0-1	JEF United Ichihara	Hiratsuka Athletics Stadium
JST (UTC+09)

4 April 1998 1-4	JEF United Ichihara	3-1	Júbilo Iwata	Ichihara Seaside Stadium
JST (UTC+09)

11 April 1998 1-5	Verdy Kawasaki	2-1	JEF United Ichihara	Todoroki Athletics Stadium
JST (UTC+09)

15 April 1998 1-6	JEF United Ichihara	1-2	Vissel Kobe	Ichihara Seaside Stadium
JST (UTC+09)

18 April 1998 1-7	Kyoto Purple Sanga	1-3	JEF United Ichihara	Toyama Athletic Stadium
JST (UTC+09)

25 April 1998 1-8	Yokohama Flügels	2-0	JEF United Ichihara	Yokohama Mitsuzawa Stadium
JST (UTC+09)

29 April 1998 1-9	JEF United Ichihara	4-1	Cerezo Osaka	Ichihara Seaside Stadium
JST (UTC+09)

2 May 1998 1-10	Sanfrecce Hiroshima	3-1	JEF United Ichihara	Hiroshima Stadium
JST (UTC+09)

5 May 1998 1-11	JEF United Ichihara	4-2	Avispa Fukuoka	Ichihara Seaside Stadium
JST (UTC+09)

9 May 1998 1-12	Consadole Sapporo	3-2 (GG) (a.e.t.)	JEF United Ichihara	Muroran Irie Stadium
JST (UTC+09)

25 July 1998 1-13	JEF United Ichihara	0-1	Shimizu S-Pulse	Ichihara Seaside Stadium
JST (UTC+09)

29 July 1998 1-14	Kashima Antlers	4-1	JEF United Ichihara	Kashima Soccer Stadium
JST (UTC+09)

1 August 1998 1-15	JEF United Ichihara	3-0	Kashiwa Reysol	Ichihara Seaside Stadium
JST (UTC+09)

5 August 1998 1-16	Gamba Osaka	3-2 (GG) (a.e.t.)	JEF United Ichihara	Osaka Expo '70 Stadium
JST (UTC+09)

8 August 1998 1-17	JEF United Ichihara	2-1	Yokohama Marinos	Ichihara Seaside Stadium
JST (UTC+09)

22 August 1998 2-1	JEF United Ichihara	1-3	Kashima Antlers	Ichihara Seaside Stadium
JST (UTC+09)

29 August 1998 2-2	Kashiwa Reysol	1-0	JEF United Ichihara	Hitachi Kashiwa Soccer Stadium
JST (UTC+09)

5 September 1998 2-3	JEF United Ichihara	0-1 (GG) (a.e.t.)	Gamba Osaka	Ichihara Seaside Stadium
JST (UTC+09)

12 September 1998 2-4	Yokohama Marinos	3-2	JEF United Ichihara	Yokohama Mitsuzawa Stadium
JST (UTC+09)

15 September 1998 2-5	JEF United Ichihara	0-2	Urawa Red Diamonds	Ichihara Seaside Stadium
JST (UTC+09)

19 September 1998 2-6	Nagoya Grampus Eight	3-0	JEF United Ichihara	Mizuho Athletic Stadium
JST (UTC+09)

23 September 1998 2-7	JEF United Ichihara	4-2	Bellmare Hiratsuka	Ichihara Seaside Stadium
JST (UTC+09)

26 September 1998 2-8	Júbilo Iwata	6-2	JEF United Ichihara	Júbilo Iwata Stadium
JST (UTC+09)

3 October 1998 2-9	JEF United Ichihara	0-2	Verdy Kawasaki	Tokyo National Stadium
JST (UTC+09)

14 October 1998 2-10	Vissel Kobe	5-5 (GG) (a.e.t.) (5-3 p)	JEF United Ichihara	Kobe Universiade Memorial Stadium
JST (UTC+09)

17 October 1998 2-11	JEF United Ichihara	1-2 (GG) (a.e.t.)	Kyoto Purple Sanga	Ichihara Seaside Stadium
JST (UTC+09)

21 October 1998 2-12	JEF United Ichihara	0-3	Yokohama Flügels	Ichihara Seaside Stadium
JST (UTC+09)

24 October 1998 2-13	Cerezo Osaka	2-0	JEF United Ichihara	Technoport Fukui Stadium
JST (UTC+09)

31 October 1998 2-14	JEF United Ichihara	0-0 (GG) (a.e.t.) (6-5 p)	Sanfrecce Hiroshima	Ichihara Seaside Stadium
JST (UTC+09)

3 November 1998 2-15	Avispa Fukuoka	2-1	JEF United Ichihara	Hakatanomori Football Stadium
JST (UTC+09)

7 November 1998 2-16	JEF United Ichihara	1-3	Consadole Sapporo	Ichihara Seaside Stadium
JST (UTC+09)

14 November 1998 2-17	Shimizu S-Pulse	4-1	JEF United Ichihara	Nihondaira Sports Stadium
JST (UTC+09)

=== Emperor's Cup ===
1st Round	bye

2nd Round	bye

13 December 1998 3rd Round	JEF United Ichihara	0-2	Honda	Ichihara Seaside Stadium
JST (UTC+09)

=== J.League Cup ===
16 May 1998 GL-D-1	JEF United Ichihara	3-2	Bellmare Hiratsuka	Ichihara Seaside Stadium
JST (UTC+09)

23 May 1998 GL-D-2	Kyoto Purple Sanga	3-3	JEF United Ichihara	Nishikyogoku Athletic Stadium
JST (UTC+09)

GL-D-3	bye

3 June 1998 GL-D-4	JEF United Ichihara	4-1	Vissel Kobe	Ichihara Seaside Stadium
JST (UTC+09)

6 June 1998 GL-D-5	Nagoya Grampus Eight	1-4	JEF United Ichihara	Mizuho Athletic Stadium
JST (UTC+09)

15 July 1998 Semifinals	JEF United Ichihara	3-2	Kashima Antlers	Ichihara Seaside Stadium
JST (UTC+09)

19 July 1998 Final	Júbilo Iwata	4-0	JEF United Ichihara	Tokyo National Stadium
JST (UTC+09)		J. League

== Player statistics ==
No.	Pos.	Nat.	Player	D.o.B. (Age)	Height / Weight	J.League		Emperor's Cup		J.League Cup		Total	
No.	Pos.	Nat.	Player	D.o.B. (Age)	Height / Weight	Apps	Goals	Apps	Goals	Apps	Goals	Apps	Goals
1	GK	(Japan)	Kenichi Shimokawa	May 14, 1970 (aged 27)	cm / kg	32	0						
2	DF	(Japan)	Eisuke Nakanishi	June 23, 1973 (aged 24)	cm / kg	22	2						
3	MF	(Japan)	Shinichi Muto	April 2, 1973 (aged 24)	cm / kg	32	3						
4	DF	(Netherlands)	Arnold Scholten	December 5, 1962 (aged 35)	cm / kg	33	2						
5	DF	(Japan)	Satoshi Yamaguchi	April 17, 1978 (aged 19)	cm / kg	30	1						
6	MF	(Japan)	Tomoyuki Sakai	June 29, 1979 (aged 18)	cm / kg	25	0						
7	FW	(South Korea)	Kim Dae-Eui	May 30, 1974 (aged 23)	cm / kg	4	0						
8	MF	(Japan)	Yoshikazu Nonomura	May 8, 1972 (aged 25)	cm / kg	23	3						
9	FW	(Japan)	Nobuhiro Takeda	May 10, 1967 (aged 30)	cm / kg	33	13						
10	MF	(Serbia and Montenegro)	Nenad Maslovar	February 20, 1967 (aged 31)	cm / kg	27	8						
11	MF	(Japan)	Atsuhiko Ejiri	July 12, 1967 (aged 30)	cm / kg	30	3						
12	GK	(Japan)	Kazuma Ito	July 11, 1976 (aged 21)	cm / kg	0	0						
13	MF	(Japan)	Hirotoshi Yokoyama	May 9, 1975 (aged 22)	cm / kg	11	0						
14	DF	(Japan)	Kazuhiro Suzuki	November 16, 1976 (aged 21)	cm / kg	19	1						
15	DF	(Japan)	Takayuki Chano	November 23, 1976 (aged 21)	cm / kg	25	0						
16	MF	(Japan)	Nozomi Hiroyama	May 6, 1977 (aged 20)	cm / kg	30	7						
17	GK	(Japan)	Ryo Kushino	March 3, 1979 (aged 19)	cm / kg	0	0						
18	DF	(Japan)	Katsushi Kurihara	July 29, 1977 (aged 20)	cm / kg	10	0						
19	FW	(Japan)	Naoki Matsushita	June 6, 1978 (aged 19)	cm / kg	5	0						
20	FW	(Japan)	Terumasa Kin	November 19, 1975 (aged 22)	cm / kg	9	1						
21	GK	(Japan)	Atsushi Shirai	April 18, 1966 (aged 31)	cm / kg	2	0						
22	DF	(Japan)	Makoto Nakayama	January 18, 1979 (aged 19)	cm / kg	0	0						
23	DF	(Japan)	Kohei Inoue	October 5, 1978 (aged 19)	cm / kg	4	0						
24	DF	(Japan)	Naoki Yakushiji	May 20, 1978 (aged 19)	cm / kg	0	0						
25	DF	(Japan)	Masakazu Washida	November 15, 1978 (aged 19)	cm / kg	0	0						
26	DF	(Japan)	Yoshihiro Yatsukawa	December 30, 1978 (aged 19)	cm / kg	0	0						
27	FW	(Japan)	Yutaka Hosoda	April 18, 1979 (aged 18)	cm / kg	0	0						
28	MF	(Japan)	Shinji Murai	December 1, 1979 (aged 18)	cm / kg	4	1						
29	FW	(Japan)	Ryohei Nishiwaki	August 1, 1979 (aged 18)	cm / kg	5	2						
30	MF	(Australia)	Matthew Bingley	August 16, 1971 (aged 26)	cm / kg	11	0						
31	MF	(Japan)	Yuki Abe	September 6, 1981 (aged 16)	cm / kg	1	0						
31	DF	(Japan)	Ichizo Nakata	April 19, 1973 (aged 24)	cm / kg	5	0						
32	FW	(Japan)	Takayuki Suzuki	June 5, 1976 (aged 21)	cm / kg	7	0						

== Other pages ==
- (in Japanese) J. League official site
