= Satoshi Yamaguchi (footballer, born 1978) =

Japanese footballer (born 1978)

Satoshi Yamaguchi 山口 智
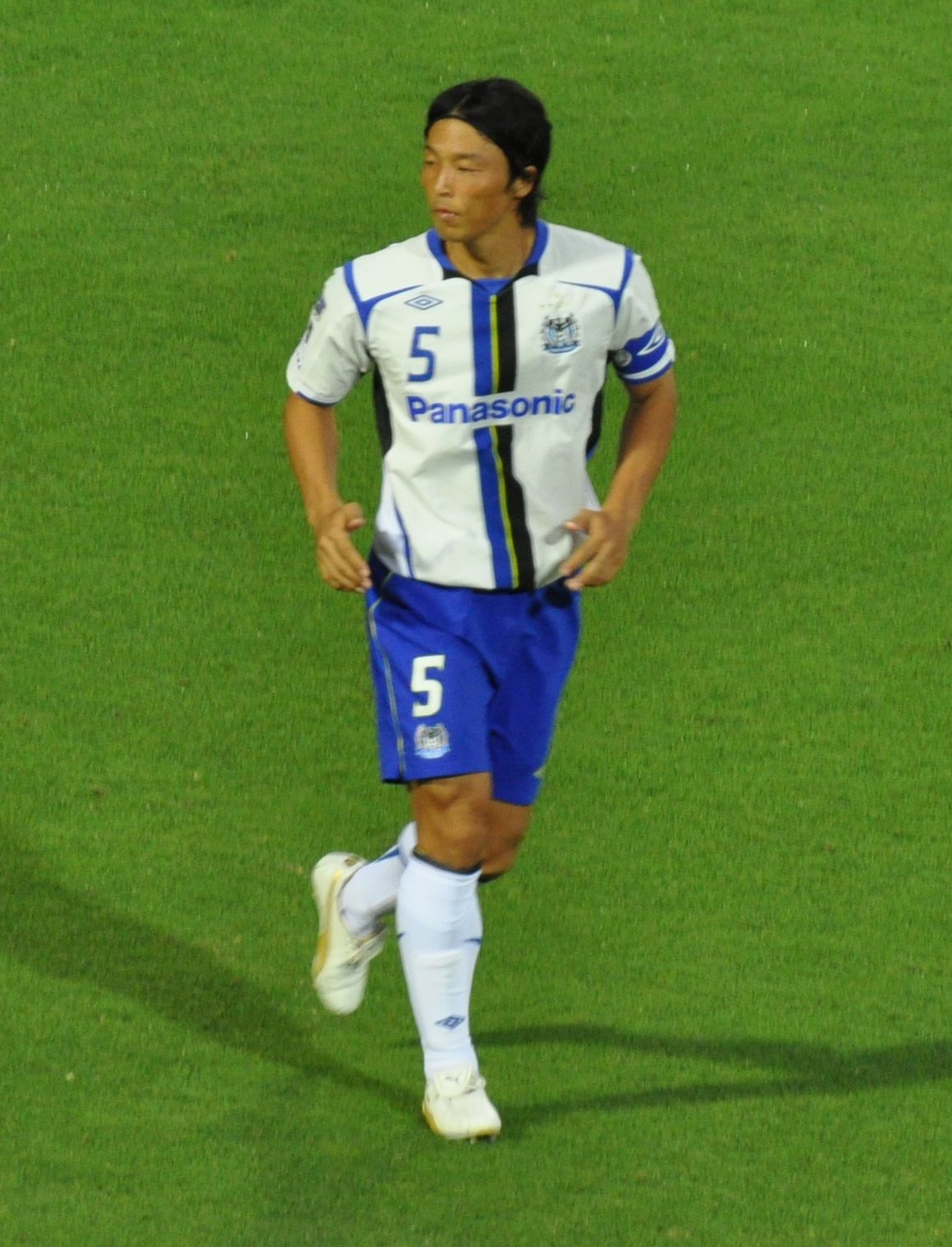
- Yamaguchi with Gamba Osaka in 2011

Personal information
- Full name: Satoshi Yamaguchi
- Date of birth: 17 April 1978 (age 48)
- Place of birth: Sakawa, Kochi, Japan
- Height: 1.78 m (5 ft 10 in)
- Position: Defender

Youth career
- 1994–1996: JEF United Ichihara

Senior career*
Years	Team	Apps	(Gls)
1996–2000	JEF United Ichihara	128	(5)
2001–2011	Gamba Osaka	320	(32)
2012–2014	JEF United Chiba	116	(13)
2015	Kyoto Sanga FC	17	(1)
Total		581	(51)

International career
1997	Japan U-20	5	(0)
2009	Japan	2	(0)

Managerial career
- 2021–: Shonan Bellmare
Medal record
JEF United Chiba
Runner-up	J.League Cup	1998
Gamba Osaka
Winner	AFC Champions League	2008
Winner	J1 League	2005
Runner-up	J1 League	2010
Winner	J.League Cup	2007
Runner-up	J.League Cup	2005
Winner	Emperor's Cup	2008
Winner	Emperor's Cup	2009
Runner-up	Emperor's Cup	2006
- * Club domestic league appearances and goals

Satoshi Yamaguchi (山口 智, Yamaguchi Satoshi; born April 17, 1978) is a Japanese professional football manager and former player who is the manager of J2 League club Shonan Bellmare.

== Club career ==
Yamaguchi was born in Sakawa, Kochi on April 17, 1978. He joined JEF United Ichihara (later JEF United Chiba) from youth team in 1996. He debuted on March 20, when he was 17 year and 354 days old. It was the youngest player to play for J1 League until Yuki Abe made new record in 1998. He became a regular player as center back from 1997. He moved to Gamba Osaka in 2001. The club won the champions 2005 J1 League, 2007 J.League Cup, 2008 and 2009 Emperor's Cup. He was also elected Best XI for 3 years in a row (2006-2008). In Asia, in 2008, the club won the champions AFC Champions League and the 3rd place Club World Cup. He returned JEF United Chiba in 2012 and played in 3 seasons. He moved to Kyoto Sanga FC in 2015 and retired end of 2015 season.

== National team career ==
In June 1997, Yamaguchi was selected Japan U-20 national team for 1997 World Youth Championship. He played as right back of 3 back defense with Tsuneyasu Miyamoto and Kazuyuki Toda full time in all 5 matches.

On May 27, 2009, Yamaguchi debuted for Japan national team against Chile. On May 31, he also played against Belgium. He played 2 games for Japan in 2009.

== Managerial career ==
From 2021 season, he will be the assistant coach of Shonan Bellmare on 14 May 2021. On 1 September 2021, Yamaguchi was appointed as manager of J1 club, Shonan Bellmare following the retirement of Bin Ukishima for during 2021 season. After winning his first victory as a manager in the 33rd round against Yokohama FC. On October 23 at same year, he led the team to remain in the final round of the 38th round against Gamba Osaka on December 4 at same year. It was decided that he would continue to serve as manager in the 2022 season and in June he was awarded the monthly best manager award.

== Club statistics ==
Club	Season	League		Emperor's Cup		J.League Cup		Continental^{1}		Other^{2}		Total	
Club	Season	Apps	Goals	Apps	Goals	Apps	Goals	Apps	Goals	Apps	Goals	Apps	Goals
JEF United Ichihara	1996	12	0	1	0	2	0	–		–		15	0
JEF United Ichihara	1997	28	2	1	1	8	0	–		–		37	3
JEF United Ichihara	1998	30	1	1	0	6	1	–		2	0	39	2
JEF United Ichihara	1999	29	0	1	0	0	0	–		-		30	0
JEF United Ichihara	2000	29	2	3	0	3	0	–		-		35	2
Gamba Osaka	2001	22	2	3	0	3	0	–		-		28	2
Gamba Osaka	2002	29	2	2	0	8	1	–		-		39	3
Gamba Osaka	2003	29	2	2	1	6	1	–		-		37	4
Gamba Osaka	2004	27	5	3	1	7	1	–		-		37	7
Gamba Osaka	2005	33	3	3	1	9	0	–		-		45	4
Gamba Osaka	2006	32	6	5	0	2	0	6	2	1	0	46	8
Gamba Osaka	2007	33	3	4	0	11	2	–		1	0	49	5
Gamba Osaka	2008	34	5	5	2	3	0	15	3	–		57	10
Gamba Osaka	2009	33	2	6	0	2	0	6	1	1	0	48	3
Gamba Osaka	2010	18	0	5	0	2	0	3	0	–		28	0
Gamba Osaka	2011	30	2	2	0	0	0	5	0	–		37	2
JEF United Chiba	2012	37	5	2	0	–		–		2	0	41	5
JEF United Chiba	2013	41	6	1	0	–		–		1	1	43	7
JEF United Chiba	2014	38	2	2	0	–		–		1	0	41	2
Kyoto Sanga FC	2015	17	1	1	0	–		–		–		18	1
Total		581	51	51	6	74	6	35	6	9	0	750	69

^{1}Includes AFC Champions League and FIFA Club World Cup.

^{2}Includes Japanese Super Cup and Promotion Playoffs to J1.

== National team statistics ==
Japan national team
Year	Apps	Goals
2009	2	0
Total	2	0

== Managerial statistics ==
As of the start from 2023 season.

Managerial record by team and tenure
Team	From	To	Record				
Team	From	To	P	W	D	L	Win %
Shonan Bellmare	1 September 2021	present	55	17	15	23	30.9
Total			55	17	15	23	30.9

== Personal honours ==
- J.League Best XI - 2006, 2007, 2008

== Team honours ==
- AFC Champions League - 2008
- Pan-Pacific Championship - 2008
- J1 League - 2005
- Emperor's Cup - 2008, 2009
- J.League Cup - 2007
- Japanese Super Cup - 2007
