= Katsushi Kurihara =

Japanese footballer (born 1977)

Katsushi Kurihara 栗原 克志
Personal information
- Full name: Katsushi Kurihara
- Date of birth: July 29, 1977 (age 49)
- Place of birth: Chiba, Japan
- Height: 1.75 m (5 ft 9 in)
- Position: Defender

Youth career
- 1993–1995: JEF United Ichihara

Senior career*
Years	Team	Apps	(Gls)
1996–1999	JEF United Ichihara	38	(0)
Total		38	(0)
Medal record
JEF United Ichihara
Runner-up	J.League Cup	1998
- * Club domestic league appearances and goals

Katsushi Kurihara (栗原 克志, Kurihara Katsushi; born July 29, 1977) is a Japanese former football player.

== Playing career ==
Kurihara was born in Chiba Prefecture on July 29, 1977. He joined his local club, JEF United Ichihara youth team in 1996. He played many matches as left side back and left side midfielder. The club also won second place in the 1998 J.League Cup. He retired at the end of the 1999 season.

== Career statistics ==
Appearances and goals by club, season and competition
Club	Season	League			Emperor's Cup		J.League Cup		Total	
Club	Season	Division	Apps	Goals	Apps	Goals	Apps	Goals	Apps	Goals
JEF United Ichihara	1996	J1 League	5	0	0	0	1	0	6	0
JEF United Ichihara	1997	J1 League	12	0	1	0	1	0	14	0
JEF United Ichihara	1998	J1 League	10	0	1	0	2	0	13	0
JEF United Ichihara	1999	J1 League	11	0	0	0	2	0	13	0
Career total			38	0	2	0	6	0	46	0
