= Peter Bosz =

Dutch association football player and manager (born 1963)

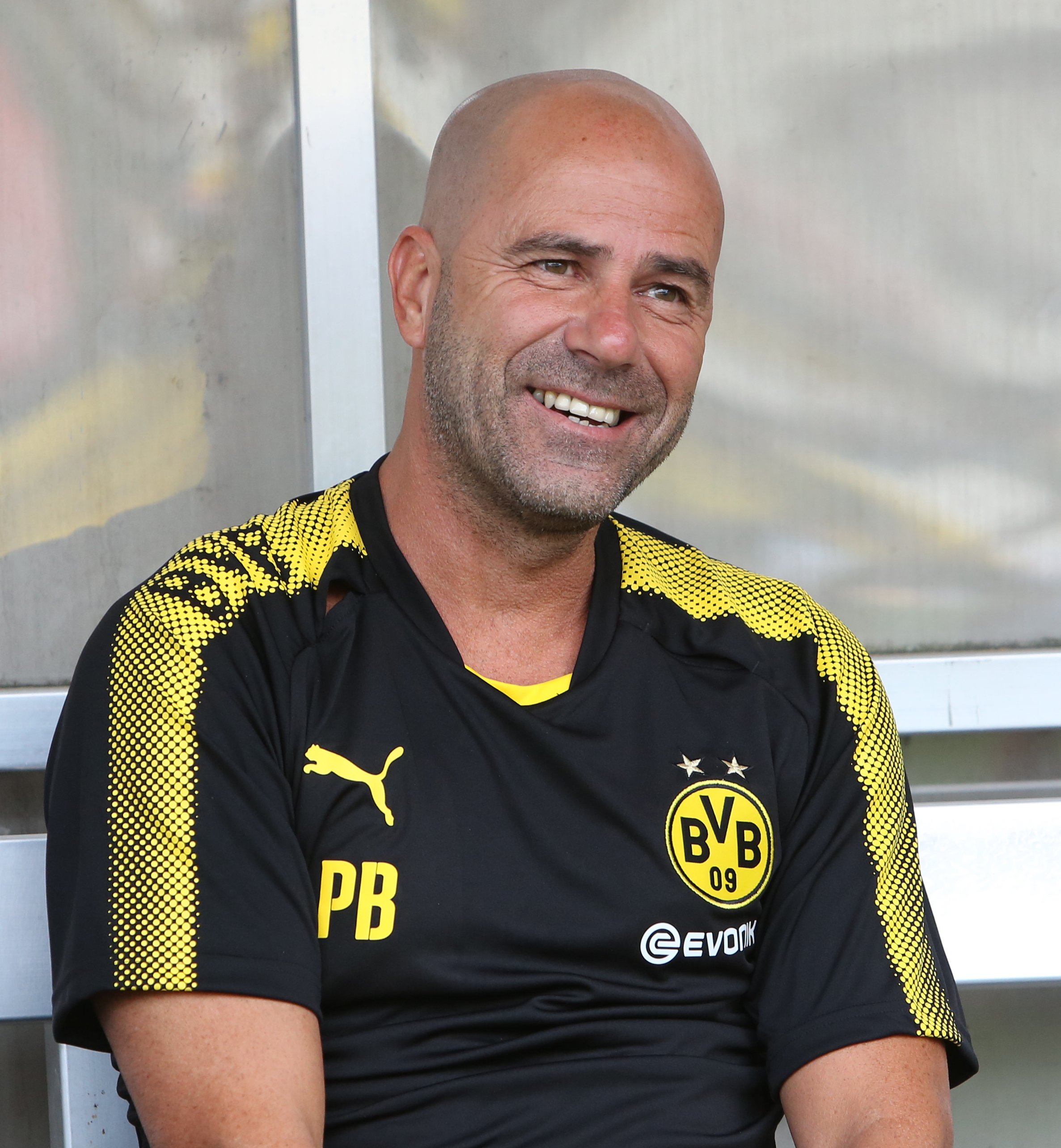
- Bosz managing Borussia Dortmund in 2017

Personal information
- Full name: Peter Sylvester Bosz
- Date of birth: 21 November 1963 (age 63)
- Place of birth: Apeldoorn, Netherlands
- Height: 1.78 m (5 ft 10 in)
- Position: Midfielder

Team information
- Current team: PSV (head coach)

Youth career
- OBV
- Apeldoornse Boys
- AGOVV

Senior career*
Years	Team	Apps	(Gls)
1981–1984	Vitesse	81	(2)
1984–1985	AGOVV (amateurs)		
1985–1988	RKC	105	(4)
1988–1991	Toulon	93	(0)
1991–1996	Feyenoord	155	(6)
1996–1997	JEF United Ichihara	36	(3)
1998	Hansa Rostock	14	(0)
1998–1999	NAC	26	(1)
1999	JEF United Ichihara	11	(0)
Total		521	(16)

International career
1991–1995	Netherlands	8	(0)

Managerial career
- 2000–2002: AGOVV
- 2002–2003: De Graafschap
- 2004–2006: Heracles Almelo
- 2010–2013: Heracles Almelo
- 2013–2016: Vitesse
- 2016: Maccabi Tel Aviv
- 2016–2017: Ajax
- 2017: Borussia Dortmund
- 2018–2021: Bayer Leverkusen
- 2021–2022: Lyon
- 2023–: PSV
- * Club domestic league appearances and goals

Peter Sylvester Bosz (Dutch pronunciation: [ˈpeːtər ˈbɔs]; born 21 November 1963) is a Dutch professional football manager and former player. He is currently the head coach of Dutch Eredivisie club PSV Eindhoven.

He had previously held managerial positions at several clubs, including Ajax where he reached the final of the UEFA Europa League in 2017, Borussia Dortmund, Bayer Leverkusen and Lyon, before being appointed as manager of PSV in June 2023, winning the Dutch Eredivisie title in 2024, 2025 and 2026.

== Playing career ==
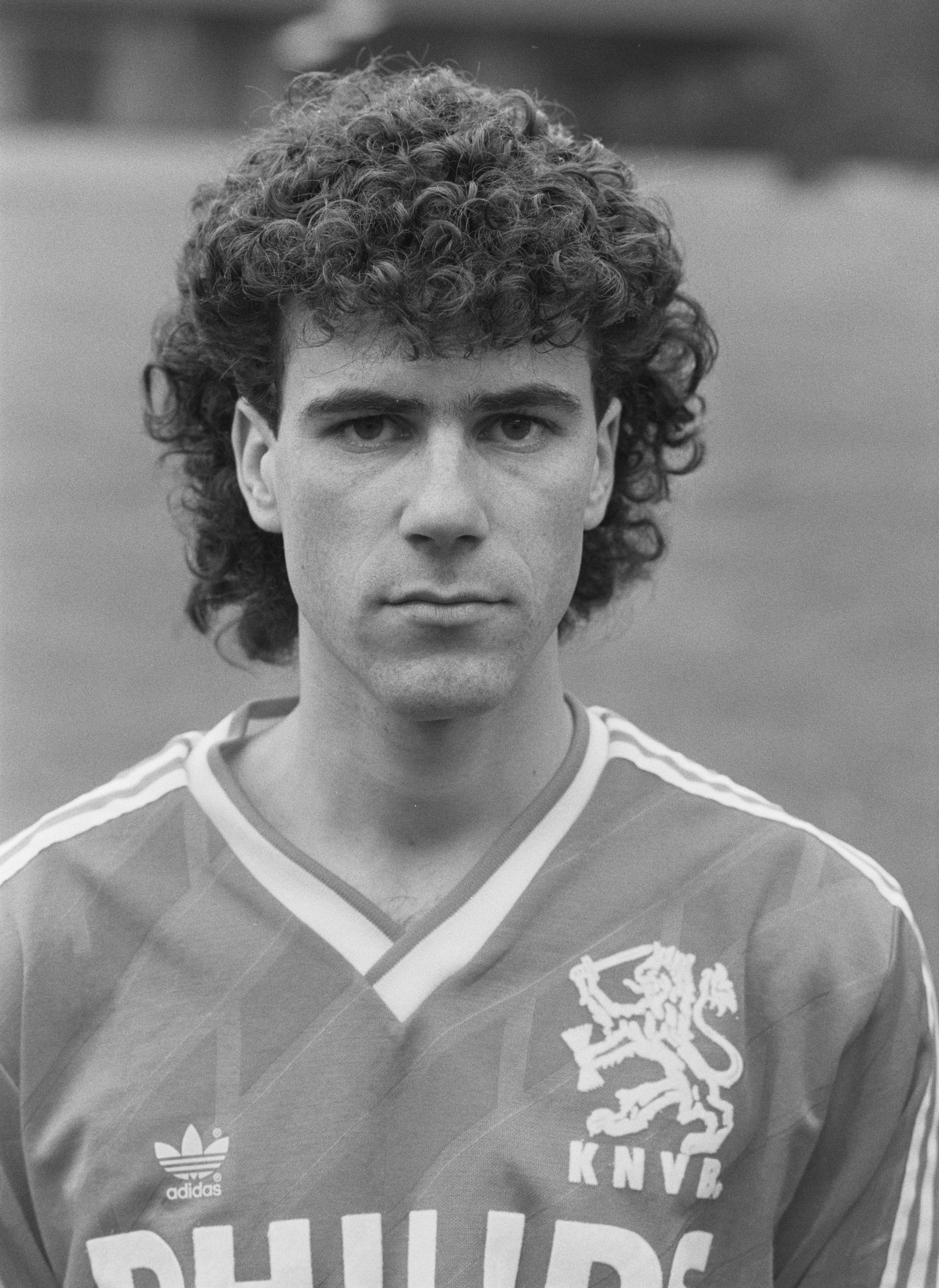
Bosz in 1988 with the Netherlands

=== Club ===
A midfielder, Bosz started his professional career with Vitesse in 1981. After a loan season with then amateurs AGOVV in 1984, he returned to professional football with RKC Waalwijk (from 1985 to 1988), then moving to France with Toulon (1988 to 1991), and playing six successive seasons with Dutch giants Feyenoord (1991 to 1996), Japanese club JEF United Ichihara (1996–97), German club Hansa Rostock (1997–98), NAC Breda (1998–99). He retired at the end of 1999 after a second spell with JEF United Ichihara.

=== International ===
Bosz made his debut for the Netherlands in a December 1991 Euro qualification match against Greece and earned eight caps, scoring no goals. His final international game was in 1995 against the Czech Republic. He was part of the Dutch squad at UEFA Euro 1992.

== Managerial career ==
=== Early career ===
After his retirement, Bosz started a career in management, first becoming head coach of amateurs AGOVV, a position he held from January 2000 to 2002. In 2002, he also won a national amateur league title. Bosz made his move into professional football in 2002, becoming head coach of De Graafschap (2002–2003). The team finished last in the 2002–03 Eredivisie and was relegated to the Eerste Divisie. Bosz next became manager of Heracles Almelo (2004–2006). He won the 2004–05 Eerste Divisie with the club and earned promotion to the Eredivisie. Bosz' Heracles secured their Eredivisie survival the following year, finishing 13th in the 2005–06 Eredivisie.

In July 2006, Bosz accepted an offer to be technical director at his former club Feyenoord. While at the club, he was responsible for completing the signings of (amongst others) Giovanni van Bronckhorst, Roy Makaay, Tim de Cler, Kevin Hofland and Denny Landzaat. He left the position on 14 January 2009, due to his opposition to the dismissal of head coach Gertjan Verbeek. In the summer of 2010, Bosz started his second spell as manager of Heracles Almelo, replacing Verbeek who had moved to AZ Alkmaar in the meantime. The team finished 8th in the 2010–11 Eredivisie, securing qualification for the European competition Playoffs, where they were eliminated by Groningen. Heracles finished 12th in the 2011–12 Eredivisie and 2012–13 Eredivisie. He left the club in 2013.

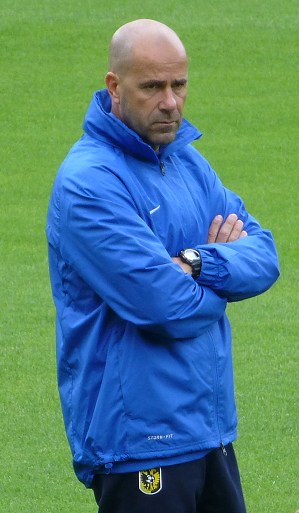
Bosz coaching Vitesse in 2013

On 19 June 2013, Bosz was appointed as manager of his old club Vitesse on a two-year contract. Bosz replaced outgoing manager Fred Rutten whose contract had expired. In November 2013, Vitesse was top of the league in the Eredivisie for the first time since 2006. It was the first time since 2000 they'd been top of the league later than the first week. Halfway through the season, after 17 matches, Vitesse was the leader in the competition. The team finished 2013–14 season in sixth place. The following season, Vitesse finished fifth, qualifying for the European competition play-offs. Also, Bosz was nominated for the Rinus Michels Award (for manager of the year), but lost to Phillip Cocu, who had led PSV Eindhoven to the Eredivisie title. In the 2015–16 season, Vitesse was in fifth place in the winter break, after which Bosz left the club. In January 2016 Bosz was announced as the new head coach of Israeli champions Maccabi Tel Aviv. Bosz left Tel Aviv in May 2016 for the Dutch team Ajax. During his time in Israel, Bosz was undefeated in 19 games, with twelve wins and seven draws. However, Tel Aviv lost the title to Hapoel Be'er Sheva and lost in the Israeli cup final to Maccabi Haifa.

=== Larger clubs ===
In May 2016, Ajax announced that Bosz was the new head coach of the club from July 2016, after signing a three-year contract. In his first competitive match as head coach, Bosz's side earned a 1–1 draw against PAOK in the third qualifying round of the Champions League on 27 July 2016. Bosz was unable to lead Ajax to the group stage of the Champions League, after losing 5–2 on aggregate to Russian side Rostov. On 11 September 2016, Bosz faced his former side Vitesse, as Ajax won 1–0. On 24 May 2017, Ajax were beaten 2–0 at Friends Arena, Stockholm in the Europa League final by Manchester United.

On 6 June 2017, it was announced that Bosz would move to German club Borussia Dortmund. Since there was no buy-out clause in his contract with his previous club, Ajax received nearly €5 million for compensation to buy out his contract. It was a record buyout of a head coach for a German club, breaking the previous record of €4 million. After no wins in their Champions League group stage, Dortmund dropped into the Europa League. On 10 December 2017, Bosz was sacked and replaced by Peter Stöger.

On 23 December 2018, he was appointed as the new head coach of Bayer Leverkusen. After his appointment, Leverkusen's form improved significantly leading to Leverkusen securing UEFA Champions League qualification in the final game of the season. Bosz was sacked in March 2021, after the team dropped to sixth place with seven points to direct UEFA Champions League qualification.

On 29 May 2021, Bosz was appointed as head coach of French side Lyon and signed a two-year contract, replacing Rudi Garcia. On 9 October 2022, Bosz was sacked ten matches into the season, with Lyon in ninth place in Ligue 1. He was replaced by Laurent Blanc.

=== PSV ===
On 23 June 2023, Bosz was appointed as the new manager of PSV Eindhoven. He signed a three-year deal. Bosz secured his first Eredivisie title with the team on 5 May 2024, ending PSV's six-year drought. On 18 May 2025, PSV confirmed their second Eredivisie title under Bosz after defeating Sparta Rotterdam 3–1 in the last match of the season. Although the team was initially 9 points behind Ajax with five matches left, they managed to narrow the lead and eventually get ahead after Ajax went on a four-match winless streak with two draws and two losses. With this, Bosz became the oldest coach to win the title at 61 years of age, as well as the third manager to win back-to-back titles in his first two years with the club.

== Coaching style ==
Bosz favours an attacking style of play, based on ball possession and aggressive pressing. Furthermore, Bosz's tactical ideas are heavily influenced by the football of Johan Cruyff.

As a result of this attacking style, Bosz has changed the positions of many of his players. Bosz won plaudits for his conversion of Ajax's Lasse Schone, who played on the wing for Frank de Boer into the holding midfield position, using Schone's technique to enhance Ajax's build-up play. Furthermore, Julian Brandt, was moved from the position of left-winger under Heiko Herrlich into a central attacking midfield position by Bosz, which resulted in a significant upturn in form. While at Lyon, he utilised midfielder Thiago Mendes as a central defender.

However, Bosz's style does have its detractors. His failure at Dortmund was partly credited to a perceived idealistic attacking approach, which left Dortmund vulnerable to the counter-attack.

== Career statistics ==
=== Club ===
Appearances and goals by club, season and competition
Club	Season	League			Emperor's Cup		J.League Cup		Total	
Club	Season	Division	Apps	Goals	Apps	Goals	Apps	Goals	Apps	Goals
1996	JEF United Ichihara	J1 League	9	0	1	0	0	0	10	0
1997	JEF United Ichihara	J1 League	27	3	2	0	8	0	37	3
1999	JEF United Ichihara	J1 League	11	0	0	0	0	0	11	0
Total			47	3	3	0	8	0	58	3

=== International ===
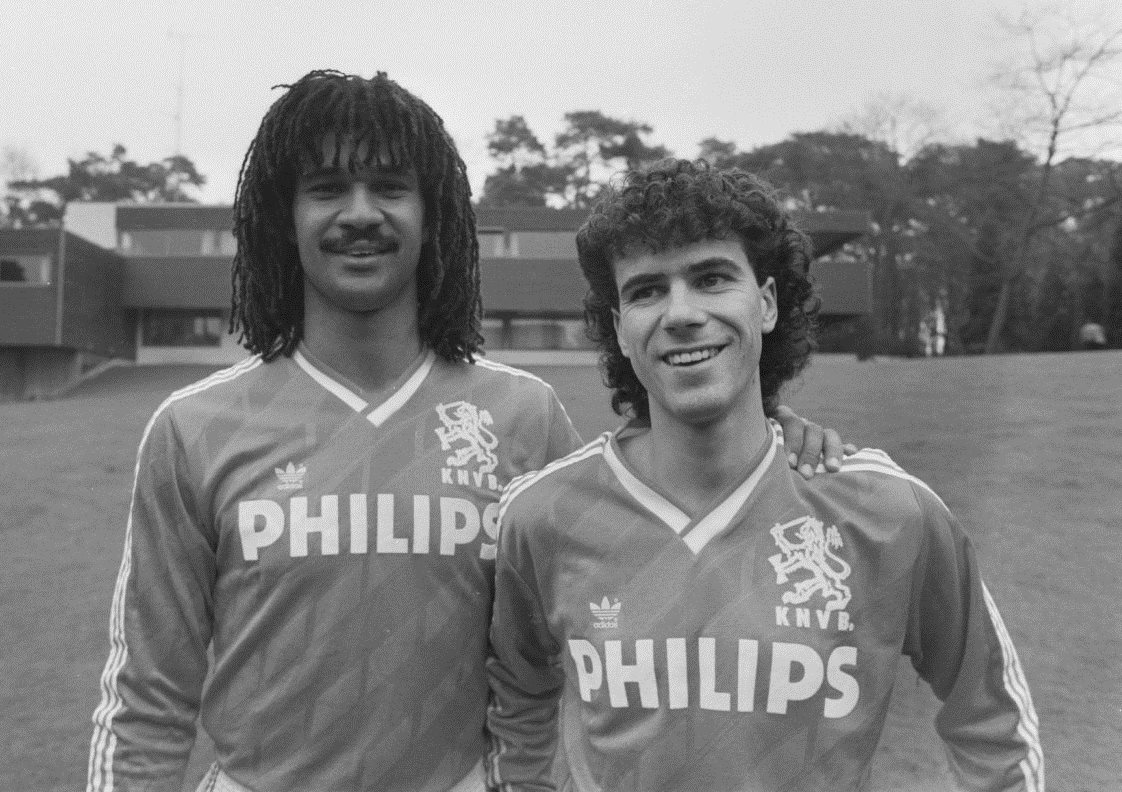
Bosz (right) and Ruud Gullit with the Dutch national team in 1988

Netherlands
Year	Apps	Goals
1991	1	0
1992	5	0
1993	0	0
1994	0	0
1995	2	0
Total	8	0

=== Managerial ===
As of match played 21 November 2026

Team	From	To	Record							
Team	From	To	G	W	D	L	GF	GA	GD	Win %
AGOVV	1 July 2000	30 June 2002	52	33	9	10	129	53	+76	63.46
De Graafschap	1 July 2002	30 June 2003	40	10	6	24	55	92	−37	25.00
Heracles Almelo	1 July 2004	30 June 2006	80	42	12	26	118	101	+17	52.50
Heracles Almelo	1 July 2010	30 June 2013	116	44	25	47	212	207	+5	37.93
Vitesse	1 July 2013	3 January 2016	103	46	27	30	197	142	+55	44.66
Maccabi Tel Aviv	4 January 2016	1 July 2016	25	17	7	1	52	16	+36	68.00
Ajax	1 July 2016	6 June 2017	56	36	11	9	119	50	+69	64.29
Borussia Dortmund	6 June 2017	10 December 2017	24	8	7	9	53	38	+15	33.33
Bayer Leverkusen	23 December 2018	23 March 2021	108	59	16	33	215	139	+76	54.63
Lyon	29 May 2021	9 October 2022	59	27	17	15	102	73	+29	45.76
PSV Eindhoven	1 July 2023	present	165	112	25	28	460	205	+255	67.88
Total			828	434	162	232	1,715	1,116	+599	52.42

== Honours ==
=== Player ===
Feyenoord

- Eredivisie: 1992–93
- KNVB Cup: 1991–92, 1993–94, 1994–95

=== Manager ===
AGOVV

- Hoofdklasse: 2002

Heracles Almelo

- Eerste Divisie: 2004–05

Ajax

- UEFA Europa League runner-up: 2016–17

Bayer Leverkusen

- DFB-Pokal runner-up: 2019–20

PSV

- Eredivisie: 2023–24, 2024–25, 2025–26
- Johan Cruyff Shield: 2023, 2025

Individual

- Eredivisie Manager of the Month: April 2026
- Rinus Michels Award: 2016–17, 2023–24
