= 1997 JEF United Ichihara season =

JEF United Ichihara
1997 season
- Manager: Jan Versleijen
- Stadium: Ichihara Seaside Stadium
- J.League: 13th
- Emperor's Cup: 4th Round
- J.League Cup: Quarterfinals
- Top goalscorer: Maslovar (9)
Home colours	Away colours

1997 JEF United Ichihara season

== Competitions ==
Competitions	Position
J.League	13th / 17 clubs
Emperor's Cup	4th round
J.League Cup	Quarterfinals

== Domestic results ==
=== J.League ===
12 April 1997 1-1	Verdy Kawasaki	0-2	JEF United Ichihara	Todoroki Athletics Stadium
JST (UTC+09)

16 April 1997 1-2	JEF United Ichihara	2-4	Kyoto Purple Sanga	Ichihara Seaside Stadium
JST (UTC+09)

1-3	bye

23 April 1997 1-4	Bellmare Hiratsuka	1-0	JEF United Ichihara	Hiratsuka Athletics Stadium
JST (UTC+09)

26 April 1997 1-5	JEF United Ichihara	1-2	Yokohama Marinos	Ichihara Seaside Stadium
JST (UTC+09)

3 May 1997 1-6	Shimizu S-Pulse	2-1	JEF United Ichihara	Nihondaira Sports Stadium
JST (UTC+09)

7 May 1997 1-7	JEF United Ichihara	3-2 (GG) (a.e.t.)	Sanfrecce Hiroshima	Ichihara Seaside Stadium
JST (UTC+09)

10 May 1997 1-8	Avispa Fukuoka	2-1	JEF United Ichihara	Nagasaki Athletic Stadium
JST (UTC+09)

17 May 1997 1-9	JEF United Ichihara	3-0	Cerezo Osaka	Ichihara Seaside Stadium
JST (UTC+09)

24 May 1997 1-10	Vissel Kobe	2-3 (GG) (a.e.t.)	JEF United Ichihara	Kobe Universiade Memorial Stadium
JST (UTC+09)

28 May 1997 1-11	JEF United Ichihara	0-2	Kashima Antlers	Tokyo National Stadium
JST (UTC+09)

31 May 1997 1-12	Nagoya Grampus Eight	3-2	JEF United Ichihara	Mizuho Athletic Stadium
JST (UTC+09)

5 July 1997 1-13	JEF United Ichihara	0-4	Yokohama Flügels	Niigata City Athletic Stadium
JST (UTC+09)

9 July 1997 1-14	Júbilo Iwata	4-1	JEF United Ichihara	Júbilo Iwata Stadium
JST (UTC+09)

12 July 1997 1-15	JEF United Ichihara	1-0	Kashiwa Reysol	Ichihara Seaside Stadium
JST (UTC+09)

16 July 1997 1-16	Urawa Red Diamonds	3-0	JEF United Ichihara	Urawa Komaba Stadium
JST (UTC+09)

19 July 1997 1-17	JEF United Ichihara	1-3	Gamba Osaka	Ichihara Seaside Stadium
JST (UTC+09)

30 July 1997 2-1	JEF United Ichihara	1-0 (GG) (a.e.t.)	Urawa Red Diamonds	Ichihara Seaside Stadium
JST (UTC+09)

2 August 1997 2-2	JEF United Ichihara	3-1	Verdy Kawasaki	Ichihara Seaside Stadium
JST (UTC+09)

6 August 1997 2-3	Kyoto Purple Sanga	2-3 (GG) (a.e.t.)	JEF United Ichihara	Kagoshima Kamoike Stadium
JST (UTC+09)

2-4	bye

16 August 1997 2-5	JEF United Ichihara	0-0 (GG) (a.e.t.) (5-6 p)	Bellmare Hiratsuka	Ichihara Seaside Stadium
JST (UTC+09)

20 August 1997 2-6	Yokohama Marinos	2-1 (GG) (a.e.t.)	JEF United Ichihara	Yokohama Mitsuzawa Stadium
JST (UTC+09)

23 August 1997 2-7	JEF United Ichihara	0-3	Shimizu S-Pulse	Ichihara Seaside Stadium
JST (UTC+09)

30 August 1997 2-8	Sanfrecce Hiroshima	3-0	JEF United Ichihara	Hiroshima Big Arch
JST (UTC+09)

3 September 1997 2-9	JEF United Ichihara	2-1	Avispa Fukuoka	Ichihara Seaside Stadium
JST (UTC+09)

6 September 1997 2-10	Cerezo Osaka	1-0	JEF United Ichihara	Osaka Nagai Stadium
JST (UTC+09)

10 September 1997 2-11	Kashiwa Reysol	1-2	JEF United Ichihara	Hitachi Kashiwa Soccer Stadium
JST (UTC+09)

13 September 1997 2-12	JEF United Ichihara	3-4 (GG) (a.e.t.)	Vissel Kobe	Technoport Fukui Stadium
JST (UTC+09)

20 September 1997 2-13	JEF United Ichihara	1-2	Nagoya Grampus Eight	Tokyo National Stadium
JST (UTC+09)

24 September 1997 2-14	Kashima Antlers	2-1 (GG) (a.e.t.)	JEF United Ichihara	Kashima Soccer Stadium
JST (UTC+09)

27 September 1997 2-15	Yokohama Flügels	1-2 (GG) (a.e.t.)	JEF United Ichihara	Kagoshima Kamoike Stadium
JST (UTC+09)

1 October 1997 2-16	JEF United Ichihara	0-5	Júbilo Iwata	Ichihara Seaside Stadium
JST (UTC+09)

4 October 1997 2-17	Gamba Osaka	4-3	JEF United Ichihara	Osaka Expo '70 Stadium
JST (UTC+09)

=== Emperor's Cup ===
1st Round	bye

2nd Round	bye

14 December 1997 3rd Round	JEF United Ichihara	1-0	Consadole Sapporo	Ichihara Seaside Stadium
JST (UTC+09)

20 December 1997 4th Round	JEF United Ichihara	1-2	Yokohama Flügels	Sendai Stadium
JST (UTC+09)

=== J.League Cup ===
8 March 1997 GL-A-1	JEF United Ichihara	4-0	Brummell Sendai	Ichihara Seaside Stadium
JST (UTC+09)

15 March 1997 GL-A-2	Bellmare Hiratsuka	1-2	JEF United Ichihara	Hiratsuka Athletics Stadium
JST (UTC+09)

19 March 1997 GL-A-3	Shimizu S-Pulse	2-0	JEF United Ichihara	Nihondaira Sports Stadium
JST (UTC+09)

22 March 1997 GL-A-4	JEF United Ichihara	3-1	Bellmare Hiratsuka	Ichihara Seaside Stadium
JST (UTC+09)

26 March 1997 GL-A-5	JEF United Ichihara	3-0	Shimizu S-Pulse	Ichihara Seaside Stadium
JST (UTC+09)

29 March 1997 GL-A-6	Brummell Sendai	1-3	JEF United Ichihara	Miyagi Athletic Stadium
JST (UTC+09)

15 October 1997 Quarterfinals-1	Nagoya Grampus Eight	4-0	JEF United Ichihara	Gifu Nagaragawa Stadium
JST (UTC+09)

18 October 1997 Quarterfinals-2	JEF United Ichihara	1-1 (1-5 agg.)	Nagoya Grampus Eight	Ichihara Seaside Stadium
JST (UTC+09)

== Player statistics ==
No.	Pos.	Nat.	Player	D.o.B. (Age)	Height / Weight	J.League		Emperor's Cup		J.League Cup		Total	
No.	Pos.	Nat.	Player	D.o.B. (Age)	Height / Weight	Apps	Goals	Apps	Goals	Apps	Goals	Apps	Goals
1	GK	(Japan)	Kenichi Shimokawa	May 14, 1970 (aged 26)	188 cm / 88 kg	15	0	2	0	7	0	24	0
2	DF	(Japan)	Eisuke Nakanishi	June 23, 1973 (aged 23)	174 cm / 73 kg	18	4	1	1	6	1	25	6
3	DF	(Japan)	Shinichi Muto	April 2, 1973 (aged 23)	168 cm / 60 kg	28	1	2	0	8	0	38	1
4	DF	(Japan)	Kazuhiro Suzuki	November 16, 1976 (aged 20)	176 cm / 67 kg	27	0	2	0	8	0	37	0
5	DF/MF	(Japan)	Satoshi Yamaguchi	April 17, 1978 (aged 18)	177 cm / 72 kg	28	2	1	1	8	0	37	3
6	MF	(Netherlands)	Bosz	November 21, 1963 (aged 33)	175 cm / 70 kg	27	3	2	0	8	0	37	3
7	MF	(Japan)	Nozomi Hiroyama	May 6, 1977 (aged 19)	173 cm / 63 kg	30	1	2	0	6	1	38	2
8	FW/MF	(Serbia and Montenegro)	Rade	May 21, 1970 (aged 26)	185 cm / 85 kg	16	8	0	0	6	8	22	16
9	FW	(Japan)	Yoshika Matsubara	August 19, 1974 (aged 22)	179 cm / 73 kg	25	8	2	0	7	3	34	11
10	MF	(Serbia and Montenegro)	Maslovar	February 20, 1967 (aged 30)	182 cm / 77 kg	17	9	2	0	4	3	23	12
11	MF	(Japan)	Atsuhiko Ejiri	July 12, 1967 (aged 29)	178 cm / 70 kg	30	1	1	0	7	0	38	1
12	GK	(Japan)	Tomonori Tateishi	April 22, 1974 (aged 22)	183 cm / 72 kg	0	0		0	0	0		0
13	DF	(Japan)	Tetsuro Uki	October 4, 1971 (aged 25)	cm / kg	5	0	0	0	2	0	7	0
14	MF	(Japan)	Yoshikazu Nonomura	May 8, 1972 (aged 24)	175 cm / 67 kg	31	1	2	0	8	0	41	1
15	DF	(Japan)	Takayuki Chano	November 23, 1976 (aged 20)	176 cm / 72 kg	8	0	1	0	4	0	13	0
16	MF	(Japan)	Takayoshi Shikida	November 25, 1977 (aged 19)	168 cm / 60 kg	14	0	0	0	4	0	18	0
17	GK	(Japan)	Ryo Kushino	March 3, 1979 (aged 18)	185 cm / 74 kg	0	0		0	0	0		0
18	DF	(Japan)	Katsushi Kurihara	July 29, 1977 (aged 19)	175 cm / 70 kg	12	0	1	0	1	0	14	0
19	FW	(Japan)	Naoki Matsushita	June 6, 1978 (aged 18)	174 cm / 68 kg	14	1	1	0	6	0	21	1
20	DF	(Japan)	Masakazu Washida	November 15, 1978 (aged 18)	183 cm / 73 kg	0	0		0	0	0		0
21	GK	(Japan)	Atsushi Shirai	April 18, 1966 (aged 30)	185 cm / 81 kg	17	0	0	0	1	0	18	0
22	DF	(Japan)	Makoto Nakayama	January 18, 1979 (aged 18)	176 cm / 67 kg	0	0		0	0	0		0
23	DF	(Japan)	Kohei Inoue	October 5, 1978 (aged 18)	173 cm / 65 kg	16	2	1	0	1	0	18	2
24	DF	(Japan)	Naoki Yakushiji	May 20, 1978 (aged 18)	180 cm / 71 kg	0	0		0	0	0		0
25	DF	(Japan)	Osamu Matsumoto	July 28, 1978 (aged 18)	182 cm / 65 kg	0	0		0	0	0		0
26	DF	(Japan)	Yoshihiro Yatsukawa	December 30, 1978 (aged 18)	168 cm / 60 kg	0	0		0	0	0		0
27	MF	(Japan)	Tomoyuki Sakai	June 29, 1979 (aged 17)	169 cm / 62 kg	18	2	2	0	1	0	21	2
28	FW	(Japan)	Takayuki Sugiyama †	March 24, 1976 (aged 20)	cm / kg	10	0	0	0	0	0	10	0
29	DF	(Netherlands)	Scholten †	December 5, 1962 (aged 34)	-cm / -kg	15	0	1	0	2	0	18	0
	MF	(Japan)	Yuki Abe †	September 6, 1981 (aged 15)	-cm / -kg	0	0	0	0	0	0	0	0
	FW	(Japan)	Ryohei Nishiwaki †	August 1, 1979 (aged 17)	-cm / -kg	0	0		0	1	0		0

- † player(s) joined the team after the opening of this season.

== Transfers ==
In:

No.	Pos.	Nation	Player
17	GK	JPN	Ryo Kushino (from Ohzu High School)
21	GK	JPN	Atsushi Shirai (from Gamba Osaka)
5	DF	JPN	Satoshi Yamaguchi (from JEF United Ichihara youth)
13	DF	JPN	Tetsuro Uki (from Tokyo Gas)
20	DF	JPN	Masakazu Washida (from Maruoka High School)
22	DF	JPN	Makoto Nakayama (from Teikyo Daisan High School)
23	DF	JPN	Kohei Inoue (from JEF United Ichihara youth)
24	DF	JPN	Naoki Yakushiji (from Shimizu Commercial High School)
25	DF	JPN	Osamu Matsumoto (from JEF United Ichihara youth)
26	DF	JPN	Yoshihiro Yatsukawa (from JEF United Ichihara youth)
8	FW	SCG	Rade Bogdanović (from Pohang Steelers)
9	FW	JPN	Yoshika Matsubara (from Shimizu S-Pulse)
19	FW	JPN	Naoki Matsushita (from Sendai Daini High School)

Out:

No.	Pos.	Nation	Player
—	GK	JPN	Norihiro Karatani (to Júbilo Iwata)
—	GK	JPN	Shinobu Nagata
—	GK	JPN	Hiroyuki Nitao (to Yokohama Flügels)
—	DF	JPN	Kazuya Igarashi
—	DF	JPN	Mikio Manaka (to Brummel Sendai)
—	DF	BRA	Sandro (to Honda Motor)
—	DF	JPN	Jun Mizuno
—	DF	JPN	Teppei Isaka (to Mito HollyHock)
—	DF	JPN	Hiroshi Kawamoto (retired)
—	MF	CZE	Hašek (to Sparta Prague)
—	MF	JPN	Hisataka Fujikawa
—	MF	JPN	Taro Goto (to Sagan Tosu)
—	MF	JPN	Shuzo Machida (retired)
—	MF	JPN	Tadahiro Akiba (to Avispa Fukuoka)
—	MF	JPN	Shinji Otsuka (to Kawasaki Frontale)
—	FW	NZL	Rufer (to 1. FC Kaiserslautern)
—	FW	JPN	Yasuhiko Niimura (to Consadole Sapporo)
—	FW	JPN	Masatoshi Hara (to Albireo Niigata)
—	FW	JPN	Shoji Jo (to Yokohama Marinos)
—	FW	JPN	Yoshiyuki Morisaki
—	FW	JPN	Kenji Kodama

== Transfers during the season ==
=== In ===
- (Japan) Takayuki Sugiyama
- (Netherlands) Arnold Scholten (from Ajax on July)
- (Japan) Yuki Abe (JEF United Ichihara youth)
- (Japan) Ryohei Nishiwaki (JEF United Ichihara youth)

=== Out ===
- (Japan) Osamu Matsumoto
- (Serbia and Montenegro) Rade (to Atlético Madrid on September)

== Awards ==
none

== Other pages ==
- (in Japanese) J. League official site
- (in Japanese) JEF United Ichihara Chiba official web site
