= Qushui, Jiangcheng County =

Qushui Town 曲水镇
- Town
- Location in Yunnan.
- Coordinates: 22°30′56″N 102°09′45″E
- Country: People's Republic of China
- Province: Yunnan
- Prefecture-level city: Pu'er City
- Autonomous county: Jiangcheng Hani and Yi Autonomous County

Area
  - Total: 588.3093 km^{2} (227.1475 sq mi)

Population (2017)
  - Total: 16,811
  - Density: 28.575/km^{2} (74.009/sq mi)
- Time zone: UTC+08:00 (China Standard)
- Postal code: 665999
- Area code: 0879

Qushui (simplified Chinese: 曲水镇; traditional Chinese: 曲水鎮; pinyin: Qǔshuǐ Zhèn) is a town in Jiangcheng Hani and Yi Autonomous County, Yunnan, China. As of the 2017 census it had a population of 16,811 and an area of 588.3093 square kilometres (227.1475 sq mi). The town sits at the junction of China, Vietnam and Laos.

== Administrative division ==
As of 2016, the town is divided into seven villages:

- Lvman (绿满村)
- Basan (坝伞村)
- Lazhu (拉珠村)
- Tianxin (田心村)
- Longtang (龙塘村)
- Gaoshan (高山村)
- Nuna (怒那村)

== History ==
On December 28, 2012, it was upgraded to a town.

== Geography ==
The town is situated at the eastern Jiangcheng Hani and Yi Autonomous County. The town is bordered to the north by Lüchun County, to the east by Vietnam, to the south by Laos, and to the west by Guoqing Township, Jiahe County and Menglie Town.

The highest point in the town is Mount Shiceng (十层大山) which stands 1,975 metres (6,480 ft) above sea level. The lowest point is in Gaoshan Village (高山村), which, at 317 metres (1,040 ft) above sea level.

The town enjoys a subtropical humid monsoon climate, with an average annual temperature of 21.8 °C (71.2 °F), total annual rainfall of 2,260-millimetre (89 in), annual average evaporation of 1,359.5-millimetre (53.52 in), and annual average sunshine hours in 1871 hours.

There are five major rivers and streams in the town, namely the Lvman River, Tuka River, Zhengkangba River, Lazhu River, and Tianxin River.

== Economy ==
Agriculture and animal husbandry also play roles in the local economy. The main crops are rice and corn.

== Demographics ==
Population census
Year	Pop.	±%
2006	10,343	—
2017	16,811	+62.5%

As of 2017, the National Bureau of Statistics of China estimates the town's population now to be 16,811.
