= Takahira =

Takahira (高平, 孝平 or 高比良) is a Japanese surname and masculine given name.

People with the surname include:

- Takahira Kogorō (高平 小五郎; 1854–1926), Japanese diplomat
- Masatoshi Takahira (高比良 政利; born 1937), Japanese wrestler
- Miyu Takahira (高平 美憂; born 1999), Japanese footballer
- Narumi Takahira (高平 成美; born 1989), Japanese voice actress
- Shinji Takahira (高平 慎士; born 1984), Japanese Olympic runner
- Kuruma Takahira (高比良 くるま, born 1994), Japanese comedian

People with the given name include:

- Kanda Takahira (神田 孝平; 1830–1898), Japanese scholar

== See also ==
- Kōhei (given name), another possible reading of the characters 高平 or 孝平
