= Yoshikazu Nonomura =

Japanese footballer

Yoshikazu Nonomura 野々村 芳和
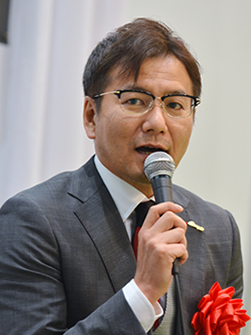

Personal information
- Full name: Yoshikazu Nonomura
- Date of birth: May 8, 1972 (age 54)
- Place of birth: Shizuoka, Japan
- Height: 1.75 m (5 ft 9 in)
- Position: Midfielder

Youth career
- 1988–1990: Shimizu Higashi High School
- 1991–1994: Keio University

Senior career*
Years	Team	Apps	(Gls)
1995–1999	JEF United Ichihara	96	(6)
2000–2001	Consadole Sapporo	58	(2)
Total		154	(8)
Medal record
JEF United Ichihara
Runner-up	J.League Cup	1998
- * Club domestic league appearances and goals

Yoshikazu Nonomura (野々村 芳和, Nonomura Yoshikazu; born May 8, 1972) is a former Japanese football player who became chairman of J. League on 31 January 2022.

== Playing career ==
Nonomura was born in Shizuoka on May 8, 1972. After graduating from Keio University, he joined JEF United Ichihara in 1995. He played many matches as defensive midfielder and right side midfielder from first season. The club won the 2nd place in 1998 J.League Cup. However his opportunity to play decreased in 1999 and he moved to J2 League club Consadole Sapporo in 2000. He played as regular player and the club won the champions in 2000 and was promoted to J1 League from 2001. He retired end of 2001 season.

== After retirement ==
After retirement, Nonomura became a chairman for Consadole Sapporo (later Hokkaido Consadole Sapporo) in March 2013. On 31 January 2022, Nonomura became a chairman for J. League.

== Career statistics ==
Appearances and goals by club, season and competition
Club	Season	League			Emperor's Cup		J.League Cup		Total	
Club	Season	Division	Apps	Goals	Apps	Goals	Apps	Goals	Apps	Goals
JEF United Ichihara	1995	J1 League	15	1	1	0	—		16	1
JEF United Ichihara	1996	J1 League	18	0	1	0	13	0	32	0
JEF United Ichihara	1997	J1 League	31	1	2	0	8	0	41	1
JEF United Ichihara	1998	J1 League	23	3	0	0	6	1	29	4
JEF United Ichihara	1999	J1 League	9	1	0	0	0	0	9	1
Consadole Sapporo	2000	J2 League	36	2	4	1	2	0	42	3
Consadole Sapporo	2001	J1 League	22	0	0	0	1	0	23	0
Career total			154	8	8	1	30	1	192	10
