= Nozomi Hiroyama =

Japanese footballer (born 1975)

Nozomi Hiroyama 廣山 望
Personal information
- Date of birth: June 6, 1975 (age 51)
- Place of birth: Sodegaura, Chiba, Japan
- Height: 1.76 m (5 ft 9 in)
- Position: Midfielder

Team information
- Current team: Japan U17 (Head Coach)

Youth career
- 1993–1995: Narashino High School

Senior career*
Years	Team	Apps	(Gls)
1996–2000	JEF United Ichihara	120	(12)
2001	Cerro Porteño	29	(3)
2002	Sport Recife	0	(0)
2002–2003	Braga	8	(0)
2003–2004	Montpellier	7	(0)
2004–2008	Tokyo Verdy	79	(11)
2005	→ Cerezo Osaka (loan)	15	(0)
2009–2010	Thespa Kusatsu	73	(3)
2011–2012	Richmond Kickers	39	(0)
Total		370	(29)

International career
1997	Japan U20	4	(1)
2001	Japan	2	(0)

Managerial career
- 2023–: Japan U17
Medal record
JEF United Ichihara
Runner-up	J.League Cup	1998
Tokyo Verdy
Winner	Emperor's Cup	2004
- * Club domestic league appearances and goals

Nozomi Hiroyama (廣山 望, Hiroyama Nozomi; born June 6, 1975) is a Japanese former professional footballer who played as a midfielder where he is currently the head coach of Japan U17.

Hiroyama played over 400 games during his career which included spells in Japan, France, Portugal, Paraguay, Brazil and United States, as well as earning two caps with the Japan national team. Hiroyama was the first Japanese footballer to dispute the Copa Libertadores competition.

== Club career ==
=== Japan ===
Hiroyama began his career with his hometown team, JEF United Ichihara, in the Japanese J1 League, helping his team to the final of the J.League Cup in 1998, and making 120 appearances and scoring 20 goals in total in his four years with the team. Whilst Hiroyama was at JEF United, the physical trainer of the team was Paraguayan, who gave good references to him, and then the opportunity was given to Hiroyama to play at Cerro Porteño.

=== South America ===
==== Cerro Porteño ====
Hiroyama signed for Paraguayan side Cerro Porteño in 2001, and during his time in South America became the first Japanese footballer to play and score in the Copa Libertadores. Hiroyama featured for Cerro Porteño for 1 year and a half. He was coached by Cesar Jacquet.

Hiroyama was one of two foreigners in Cerro Porteño's squad, which included Costa Rican footballer Froylan Ledezma. In Cerro Porteño's team, Hiroyama colleagued with Aldo Bobadilla, Diego Barreto, Nelson Zelaya, Carlos Baez, Sergio Aquino, Jorge Luis Campos, Guido Alvarenga, Julio dos Santos, Cesar Ramirez, Virgilio Ferreira, Santiago Salcedo and Ledezma.

Hiroyama scored 3 goals in 27 league games for Cerro Porteño. Hiroyama scored in a 1–0 victory against Sportivo San Lorenzo.

In the 2001 Copa Libertadores, Hiroyama scored 2 goals in 7 games. On 22 March 2001, Hiroyama scored a double in a 4–0 away victory against Sport Boys Callao in the Copa Libertadores. Both goals came in the first half of the game. On 10 April, Hiroyama played in Cerro Porteño's 6–0 home victory against Universidad de Chile. On 10 May in Cerro Porteño's first-leg tie of the Copa Libertadores round of 16 stage against Mexican club Cruz Azul, Hiroyama played in the team's 2–1 home victory. On 16 May, Hiroyama played in the team's 3–1 away defeat in the second-leg.

Hiroyama also played in the 2001 Copa Mercosur, appearing 8 times. He started on 5 occasions in the competition.

Hiroyama was champion with Cerro Porteño in the tournament of 2001.

==== Sport Recife ====
He moved to Brazilian side Sport Recife prior to the 2002 season, but never managed to find a way into the team, and left for Europe halfway through the season without making a senior appearance.

=== Europe ===
Hiroyama signed for Portuguese team Braga in the winter of 2002, but made just 8 appearances for the team before moving on to French side Montpellier; again, Hiroyama was unable to cement a place in the first team, and returned home to Japan prior to the beginning of the 2004 J1 League season.

=== Japan ===
Hiroyama quickly established himself at Tokyo Verdy, helping his team win the 2004 Emperor's Cup, and playing in the 2006 AFC Champions League, but was unable to prevent his side being relegated into J2 that same year. He had a brief spell on loan at Cerezo Osaka in 2005, before moving on to J2 side Thespa Kusatsu in 2009, having made 79 league appearances and scored 11 goals for Tokyo.

=== United States ===
Hiroyama signed with Richmond Kickers of the USL Professional Division on March 16, 2011, and made his debut for his new team on April 9, in a game against the Pittsburgh Riverhounds

On August 17, 2012, Hiroyama announced his retirement from professional football.

== International career ==
In June 1997, Hiroyama was selected Japan U-20 national team for 1997 World Youth Championship. He played 4 matches as right midfielder and scored a goal against Paraguay.

On October 4, 2001, Hiroyama debuted for Japan national team against Senegal. On October 7, he also played against Nigeria. He played 2 games for Japan in 2001.

== Coaching career ==
In 2020, Hiroyama was the second coach of Japan's under-16 national team.

== Personal life ==
In Paraguay, Hiroyama liked Sopa paraguaya and Empanadas. Also, he drank lots of Terere and took with him a Terere thermus kit to keep drinking. In terms of Paraguay's Guarani language, Hiroyama learnt a few words.

== Career statistics ==
=== Club ===
Appearances and goals by club, season and competition
Club	Season	League		National cup		League cup		Continental		Total	
Club	Season	Apps	Goals	Apps	Goals	Apps	Goals	Apps	Goals	Apps	Goals
JEF United Ichihara	1996	21	1	1	0	8	1	-		30	2
JEF United Ichihara	1997	30	1	4	2	6	1	–		40	4
JEF United Ichihara	1998	30	7	1	0	4	2	–		35	9
JEF United Ichihara	1999	30	2	3	0	0	0	–		33	2
JEF United Ichihara	2000	9	1	3	0	0	0	–		12	1
Cerro Porteño	2001	29	3					7	2	36	5
Sport Recife	2002	0	0							0	0
Braga	2002–03	8	0	0	0	1	0	–		9	0
Montpellier	2003–04	7	0							7	0
Tokyo Verdy	2004	4	0	1	0	1	0	–		6	0
Tokyo Verdy	2006	27	4	1	0	–		2	0	30	4
Tokyo Verdy	2007	32	7	1	0	–		–		33	7
Tokyo Verdy	2008	16	0	1	0	4	1	–		21	1
Cerezo Osaka (loan)	2005	15	0	0	0	3	0	–		18	0
Thespa Kusatsu	2009	44	3	2	0	–		–		46	3
Thespa Kusatsu	2010	29	0	0	0	–		–		29	0
Richmond Kickers	2011	20	0	3	1	–		–		23	1
Richmond Kickers	2012	19	0	1	0	–		–		20	0
Career total		370	29	22	3	27	5	9	2	428	39

=== International ===
Appearances and goals by national team and year
National team	Year	Apps	Goals
Japan	2001	2	0
Total		2	0
