= Centric Holdings =

Greek company

Centric Holdings S.A
- Formerly: Centric Multimedia
- Type: Public company (Anonymi Etairia)
- Traded as: Athex: CENTR
- Founded: 1995; 31 years ago
- Headquarters: Athens, Greece
- Key people: Rodolfo Odoni (Managing Director); Ioannis Capodistrias (Vice-President); George Athanasopoulos (COO)
- Revenue: ▲€859. million (2015)
- Number of employees: 14
- Website: www.centric.gr

Centric Holdings, formerly Centric Multimedia, is a Greek company that holds investments in entertainment and multimedia businesses. It has been trading on the Athens Stock Exchange (ATHEX) since 2002.

== History ==
=== Foundation and early year ===
Centric was founded in 1995 under the trading name "Group Multimedia Systems S.A." and it specialized in the production and distribution of digital products and home entertainment services.

Since its inception the company expanded its operations in the digital gaming industry, representing and distributing game consoles, computer games, online games and computer and gaming console peripherals in the Greek Market. In 2001, Centric signed an agreement with Microsoft for the distribution of the Xbox gaming console in Greece, establishing its position in the digital home entertainment market.

In 2002 Centric had an initial public offering on the Athens Stock Exchange and started trading in public.

=== Change of direction - 2007 ===
Due to the intense competition and the illegal software copying ("piracy") of gaming software, which ultimately suppressed gross profit margins and have therefore restrained long-term growth prospects for the digital home entertainment industry, Centric decided to explore different investment opportunities in order to enhance its presence in the digital entertainment industry. Hence in 2007 the company decided to focus on the integration of online services capitalizing on its vast experience on the business.

The online entertainment companies at the time were offering a combination of traditional services such as sportsbook, casino, poker and several soft games.

Therefore, in 2007 Centric started shifting its investments in areas with better growth prospects in order to boost its financial performance. The company acquired 21% of ECN Management Ltd, a company that owns the VistaΒet.com site. In addition Centric acquired 100% of Flyer S.A., which was the marketing partner of Sportingbet Plc for the provision of its online entertainment services in the Greek language.

=== Expanding partnerships 2008 - Present ===
In 2008 Centric raised its stake in ECN Management Ltd to a total of 51% further enhancing its position in the online entertainment market.

The company gradually distanced itself from the activity of the distribution of digital content and in 2011 has decided to discontinue it. Further, in 2012 under a decision of the General Meeting of its shareholders, Centric changed its name from Centric Multimedia to Centric Holdings, trusting that the new name depicts better and more accurately its current activities. Centric core activity is still to participate in online entertainment industry companies.

Its subsidiaries cooperate with Sportingbet Plc, now a subsidiary of Gaming VC, in the exploitation of "Sportingbet" and "VistaBet" brands. Additionally, Centric owns minority stakes in companies that are active in the hotels, shipping and it is also active in the Renewable Energy Sector.

== See also ==
- 1453–1821: The Coming of Liberation
