= Kohei Yamamoto =

Kohei Yamamoto may refer to:

- Kohei Yamamoto (footballer) (山本 孝平, born 1986), Japanese football player
- Kohei Yamamoto (cyclist) (山本 幸平, born 1985), Japanese cross-country mountain biker
- Kohei Yamamoto (swimmer) (山本 耕平), Japanese swimmer
- Kohei Yamamoto (actor) (山本 康平, born 1980), Japanese actor
