= Kohei Inoue =

Japanese footballer (born 1978)

Kohei Inoue 井上 公平
Personal information
- Full name: Kohei Inoue
- Date of birth: October 5, 1978 (age 48)
- Place of birth: Osaka, Japan
- Height: 1.74 m (5 ft 8 1/2 in)
- Position: Defender

Youth career
- 1994–1996: JEF United Ichihara

Senior career*
Years	Team	Apps	(Gls)
1997–1999	JEF United Ichihara	20	(2)
2000–2001	Albirex Niigata	55	(0)
2002–2006	Sagawa Express Tokyo	82	(2)
Total		157	(4)
Medal record
JEF United Ichihara
Runner-up	J.League Cup	1998
- * Club domestic league appearances and goals

Kohei Inoue (井上 公平, Inoue Kōhei; born October 5, 1978) is a former Japanese football player.

== Playing career ==
Inoue was born in Osaka Prefecture on October 5, 1978. He joined the J1 League club JEF United Ichihara as part of the youth team in 1997. He played as defensive midfielder during the first season. However he did not play as much in 1998. In 2000, he moved to the J2 League club Albirex Niigata. He became a regular player as right side back and played there for two seasons. In 2002, he moved to the Japan Football League club Sagawa Express Tokyo. He played often for five seasons and retired at the end of the 2006 season.

== Club statistics ==
Club performance			League		Cup		League Cup		Total	
Season	Club	League	Apps	Goals	Apps	Goals	Apps	Goals	Apps	Goals
Japan			League		Emperor's Cup		J.League Cup		Total	
1997	JEF United Ichihara	J1 League	16	2	1	0	1	0	18	2
1998	JEF United Ichihara	J1 League	4	0	0	0	0	0	4	0
1999	JEF United Ichihara	J1 League	0	0	0	0	0	0	0	0
2000	Albirex Niigata	J2 League	20	0	0	0	0	0	20	0
2001	Albirex Niigata	J2 League	35	0	0	0	2	0	37	0
2002	Sagawa Express Tokyo	Football League	13	0			-		13	0
2003	Sagawa Express Tokyo	Football League	18	1			-		18	1
2004	Sagawa Express Tokyo	Football League	13	0	3	0	-		16	0
2005	Sagawa Express Tokyo	Football League	24	0	3	0	-		27	0
2006	Sagawa Express Tokyo	Football League	14	1	0	0	-		14	1
Total			157	4	7	0	3	0	167	4
