= Kōhei (given name) =

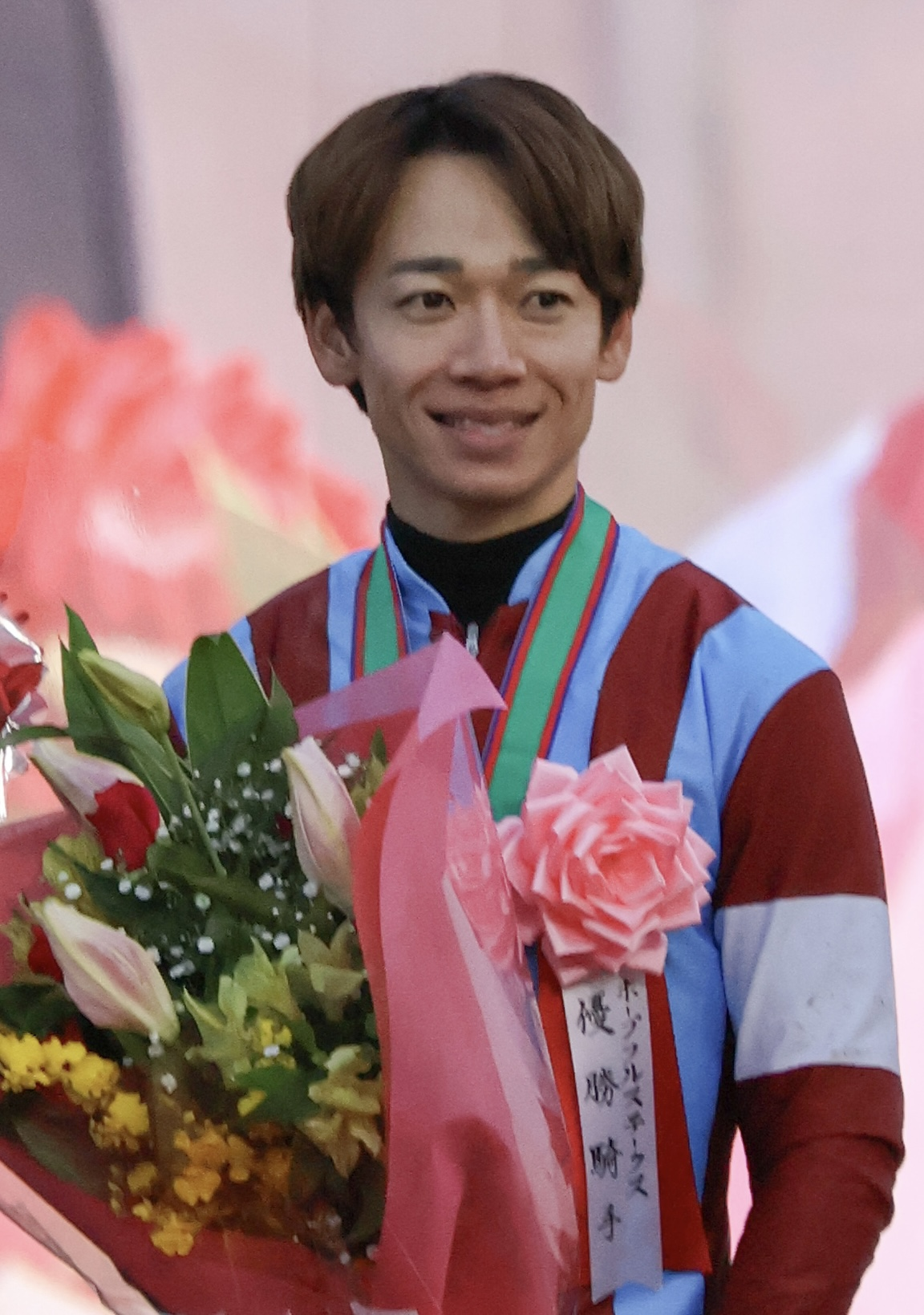
- Kohei Matsuyama, Japanese jockey
- Gender: Male

Origin
- Origin: Japanese
- Meaning: Different meanings depending on the kanji used

Kōhei, Kohei or Kouhei (written: 公平, 幸平, 航平, 孝平, 康平, 浩平, 耕平, 弘平, 厚平, 滉平, 晃平, 晃兵, 恒平, or 高平) is a masculine Japanese given name. Notable people with the name include:

- Kohei Aoki (青木康平, born 1980), Japanese basketball player
- Kōhei Funae (船江 恒平, born 1987), Japanese shogi player
- Kohei Futaoka (二岡 康平; born 1994), Japanese long-distance runner
- Harumafuji Kōhei (日馬富士 公平; born 1984), Mongolian sumo wrestler
- Kōhei Hasebe (長谷部 浩平; born 1994), Japanese shogi player
- Kohei Hattanda (八反田 康平; born 1990), Japanese footballer
- Kohei Hayashi (林 晃平; born 1978), Japanese footballer
- Kohei Higa (比嘉 厚平; born 1990), Japanese footballer
- Kōhei Horikoshi (堀越 耕平; born 1986), Japanese manga artist
- Kohei Inoue (井上 公平; born 1978), Japanese footballer
- Kouhei Kadono (上遠野 浩平; born 1968), Japanese writer
- Kohei Kato (加藤 恒平; born 1989), Japanese footballer
- Kohei Kawata (河田 晃兵; born 1978), Japanese footballer
- Kohei Kitagawa (北川 滉平; born 1995), Japanese footballer
- Kohei Kiyama (喜山 康平; born 1988), Japanese footballer
- Kōhei Kiyasu (喜安 浩平; born 1975), Japanese actor and voice actor
- Kohei Kono (河野 公平; born 1980), Japanese boxer
- Kouhei Kumai (熊井 幸平; born 1990), Japanese actor
- Kohei Matsumoto (松本 孝平; born 1994), Japanese footballer
- Kohei Matsuyama (松山 弘平; born 1990), Japanese jockey
- Kohei Mihara (三原 向平; born 1989), Japanese footballer
- Kohei Mishima (三島 康平; born 1987), Japanese footballer
- Kohei Mitamura (三田村 康平; born 1992), Japanese ice hockey player
- Kōhei Miyauchi (宮内 幸平; 1929–1995), Japanese voice actor
- Kōhei Morihara (森原 康平; born 1991), Japanese professional baseball player
- Kohei Nasu (那須 弘平; born 1942), Japanese judge
- Kohei Nishino (西野 晃平; born 1982), Japanese footballer
- Kohei Nishi (にしくん, born 1993), Japanese former AV actor, former AV director, and host
- Kōhei Oguri (小栗 康平; born 1945), Japanese film director and screenwriter
- Kohei Okuno (奥野 耕平; born 2000), Japanese footballer
- Kohei Otsuka (大塚 耕平; 1959–2026), Japanese politician
- Kohei Sato (佐藤 耕平, born 1977), Japanese wrestler
- Kohei Shimizu (清水 航平; born 1989), Japanese footballer
- Kohei Shimizu (skier) (清水 康平; born 1989), Japanese cross-country skier
- Kohei Shimoda (下田 光平; born 1989), Japanese footballer
- Kouhei Takeda (武田 航平; born 1986), Japanese actor
- Tamaarashi Kōhei (玉嵐 孝平; 1941–1993), Japanese sumo wrestler
- Kohei Tanaka (composer) (田中 公平; born 1954), Japanese composer
- Kohei Tanaka (footballer) (田中 康平; born 1985), Japanese footballer
- Kohei Tomita (冨田 康平; born 1996), Japanese footballer
- Kohei Uchida (内田 航平; born 1993), Japanese footballer
- Kohei Uchima (内間 康平; born 1988), Japanese cyclist
- Kōhei Uchimura (内村 航平; born 1989), Japanese artistic gymnast
- Wakamiyama Kōhei (若見山 幸平; born 1943), Japanese sumo wrestler
- Kohei Yamada (山田 晃平; born 1989), Japanese footballer
- Kohei Yamamoto (disambiguation), multiple people
- Kohei Yamamichi (山道 高平; born 1980), Japanese football defender
- Yasu Kōhei (屋須 弘平; 1846–1917), Japanese photographer
