= Baozang =

Baozang Town
- Town
- 宝藏镇
- Location in Yunnan.
- Coordinates: 22°41′05″N 101°39′00″E
- Country: People's Republic of China
- Province: Yunnan
- Prefecture-level city: Pu'er City
- Autonomous county: Jiangcheng Hani and Yi Autonomous County

Area
  - Total: 564 km^{2} (218 sq mi)

Population (2017)
  - Total: 11,000
  - Density: 20/km^{2} (51/sq mi)
- Time zone: UTC+08:00 (China Standard)
- Postal code: 665904
- Area code: 0879

Baozang (simplified Chinese: 宝藏镇; traditional Chinese: 寶藏鎮; pinyin: Bǎozàng Zhèn) is a town in Jiangcheng Hani and Yi Autonomous County, Yunnan, China. As of the 2017 census it had a population of 11,000 and an area of 564 square kilometres (218 sq mi).

== Administrative division ==
As of 2016, the town is divided into six villages:

- Shuicheng (水城村);
- Liangmahe (良马河村);
- Banhe (板河村);
- Haiming (海明村);
- Qianjin (前进村);
- Longma (龙马村).

== History ==
On December 28, 2012, it was upgraded to a town.

== Geography ==
The town sits at the southwestern Jiangcheng Hani and Yi Autonomous County. It borders Mojiang Hani Autonomous County in the north, GuoqingTownship and Menglie Town in the east, Kangping Town in the south, and Ning'er Hani and Yi Autonomous County in the west.

The town enjoys a subtropical humid monsoon climate, with an average annual temperature of 24 °C (75 °F), and total annual rainfall of 2,200-millimetre (87 in).

The Mengye River (勐野江) and Nankeng River (南坑河) flow through the town.

== Economy ==
The economy of the province is mainly based on agriculture and animal husbandry. Tea, sugarcane and natural rubber are the economic crops in the region.

== Demographics ==
Population census
Year	Pop.	±%
2006	8,909	—
2017	11,000	+23.5%

As of 2017, the National Bureau of Statistics of China estimates the town's population now to be 11,000.
