= Kangping, Jiangcheng County =

Kangping Town 康平镇
- Town
- Location in Yunnan.
- Coordinates: 22°36′09″N 101°27′17″E
- Country: People's Republic of China
- Province: Yunnan
- Prefecture-level city: Pu'er City
- Autonomous county: Jiangcheng Hani and Yi Autonomous County
- Designated (town): 2012

Area
  - Total: 798.69 km^{2} (308.38 sq mi)

Population (2017)
  - Total: 24,403
  - Density: 30.554/km^{2} (79.134/sq mi)
- Time zone: UTC+08:00 (China Standard)
- Postal code: 665903
- Area code: 0879

Kangping (simplified Chinese: 康平镇; traditional Chinese: 康平鎮; pinyin: Kāngpíng Zhèn) is a town in Jiangcheng Hani and Yi Autonomous County, Yunnan, China. As of the 2017 census it had a population of 24,403 and an area of 798.69 square kilometres (308.38 sq mi).

== Administrative division ==
As of 2016, the town is divided into nine villages:

- Yingpanshan (营盘山村)
- Dashujiao (大树脚村)
- Manlaojie (曼老街村)
- Mankelao (曼克老村)
- Zhongping (中平村)
- Mengkang (勐康村)
- Yaojiashan (瑶家山村)
- Jiebei (界碑村)
- Liangkeshu (两棵树村)

== History ==
On December 28, 2012, it was upgraded to a town.

== Geography ==
The town sits at the western Jiangcheng Hani and Yi Autonomous County. It is surrounded by Ning'er Hani and Yi Autonomous County on the northwest, Simao District on the west, Jinghong on the south, and Laos on the southeast.

The highest point in the town is the Lion Rock (狮子岩) which stands 2,207 metres (7,241 ft) above sea level. The lowest point is the junction of Mengkang River and Mengye River (勐康河与勐野江交汇处), which, at 830 metres (2,720 ft) above sea level.

The town enjoys a subtropical monsoon humid climate, with an average annual temperature of 18.1 °C (64.6 °F), total annual rainfall of 2,212-millimetre (87.1 in), and annual average evaporation is 1,359.5-millimetre (53.52 in).

The Manlao River (曼老江) flows through the town northwest to southeast.

== Economy ==
The town's economy is based on nearby mineral resources and agricultural resources. Tea, sugarcane, coffee, cassava, fruit, lac, banana, pineapple, and bamboo are cash crops of the town. The region abounds with copper, lead, tungsten, zinc, salt, coal, gypsum, limestone, terrazzo, and sand.

== Demographics ==
Population census
Year	Pop.	±%
2006	23,115	—
2017	24,403	+5.6%

As of 2017, the National Bureau of Statistics of China estimates the town's population now to be 24,403.

== Transportation ==
The Provincial Highway S214 passes across the town northwest to southeast.
