= 1993 JEF United Ichihara season =

JEF United Ichihara
1993 season
- Manager: Yoshikazu Nagai
- Stadium: Ichihara Stadium
- J.League: 8th
- Emperor's Cup: Quarterfinals
- J.League Cup: GL-A 5th
- Top goalscorer: League: Pavel (16); All: Pavel (22)
- Highest home attendance: 10,551 (vs Nagoya Grampus Eight, 4 August 1993); 53,570 (vs Urawa Red Diamonds, 17 November 1993, Tokyo National Stadium)
- Lowest home attendance: 8,941 (vs Yokohama Flügels, 7 July 1993)
- Average home league attendance: 20,273
Home colours	Away colours

1993 JEF United Ichihara season

== Review and events ==
=== League results summary ===
Overall								Home						Away					
Pld	W	D	L	GF	GA	GD	Pts	W	D	L	GF	GA	GD	W	D	L	GF	GA	GD
36	14	0	22	51	67	−16	42	7	0	11	27	32	−5	7	0	11	24	35	−11

Source: J.LEAGUE OFFICIAL RECORD & DATA 1994. ISBN 4-09-102309-6.

=== League results by round ===
J.League Suntory series (first stage)
Round	1	2	3	4	5	6	7	8	9	10	11	12	13	14	15	16	17	18
Ground	A	H	A	H	A	A	H	A	H	A	H	A	H	H	A	H	A	H
Result	L	W	W	W	W	L	L	L	W	L	W	W	L	L	L	W	W	L
Position	7	4	2	1	1	2	3	3	3	4	2	2	3	4	5	4	4	5

Source: J.LEAGUE OFFICIAL RECORD & DATA 1994. ISBN 4-09-102309-6.
A = Away; H = Home; W = Win; D = Draw; L = Loss

J.League NICOS series (second stage)
Round	1	2	3	4	5	6	7	8	9	10	11	12	13	14	15	16	17	18
Ground	H	A	H	A	A	A	H	H	H	H	A	H	H	H	A	A	A	A
Result	W	W	W	L	W	L	L	L	L	L	W	L	L	L	L	L	L	L
Position	4	1	1	2	2	3	3	5	7	7	6	7	7	8	8	8	8	9

Source: J.LEAGUE OFFICIAL RECORD & DATA 1994. ISBN 4-09-102309-6.
A = Away; H = Home; W = Win; D = Draw; L = Loss

== Competitions ==
Competitions	Position
J.League	8th / 10 clubs
Emperor's Cup	Quarterfinals
J.League Cup	GL-A 5th / 7 clubs

== Domestic results ==
=== J.League ===
==== Suntory series ====
16 May 1993 1st-1	Sanfrecce Hiroshima	2–1	JEF United Ichihara	Hiroshima Stadium
13:59 JST (UTC+09)	Kazama 1'; Kojima 82'	J. League	Pavel 67'	Attendance: 11,875; Referee: Hiroyuki Umemoto; Assistant referees: Yoshikazu Hiroshima, Hiroshi Tanabe

19 May 1993 1st-2	JEF United Ichihara	2–1	Verdy Kawasaki	Tokyo National Stadium
19:02 JST (UTC+09)	Littbarski 66'; Sasaki 72'	J. League	Kitazawa 68'	Attendance: 46,959; Referee: Martin Bodenham; Assistant referees: Yū Nakamura, Takashi Kunori; Fourth official: Kaoru Nagase

22 May 1993 1st-3	Gamba Osaka	0–3	JEF United Ichihara	Expo '70 Commemorative Stadium
19:01 JST (UTC+09)		J. League	Littbarski 28'; Pavel 39'; Ejiri 89'	Attendance: 15,993; Referee: Hiroyuki Umemoto; Assistant referees: Kazunori Okada, Kazuya Yanagisawa; Fourth official: Kazuo Kakihana

26 May 1993 1st-4	JEF United Ichihara	1–0	Urawa Red Diamonds	Tokyo National Stadium
19:02 JST (UTC+09)	Franta 42'	J. League		Attendance: 45,033; Referee: Tatsumi Ōno; Assistant referees: Mitsuru Satō, Kazuaki Hamaguchi; Fourth official: Morio Okamoto

29 May 1993 1st-5	Yokohama Marinos	0–5	JEF United Ichihara	Yokohama Mitsuzawa Football Stadium
14:01 JST (UTC+09)		J. League	Kageyama 13'; 38' (o.g.); Pavel 47'; Ejiri 51'; Littbarski 82'	Attendance: 11,152; Referee: Kiyoshi Ōta; Assistant referees: Yū Nakamura, Satoru Ishizawa; Fourth official: Tadahiko Nishimaki

2 June 1993 1st-6	Kashima Antlers	2–1 (a.s.d.e.t.)	JEF United Ichihara	Kashima Soccer Stadium
19:00 JST (UTC+09)	Alcindo 24'; Carlos 91'	J. League	Makino 87'	Attendance: 15,194; Referee: Tetsuya Hamana; Assistant referees: Yū Nakamura, Hiroshi Fukuda; Fourth official: Ichirō Inukai

5 June 1993 1st-7	JEF United Ichihara	1–2 (a.s.d.e.t.)	Shimizu S-Pulse	Ichihara Stadium
18:31 JST (UTC+09)	Ejiri 35'	J. League	Edu 43'; Hasegawa 116'	Attendance: 9,427; Referee: Kenji Tanaka; Assistant referees: Hiroshi Fukuda, Masato Nogami; Fourth official: Katsuhiko Takayama

9 June 1993 1st-8	Yokohama Flügels	1–0	JEF United Ichihara	Yokohama Mitsuzawa Football Stadium
19:05 JST (UTC+09)	Aldro 89'	J. League		Attendance: 13,633; Referee: Shizuo Takada; Assistant referees: Kazuaki Hamaguchi, Mitsuru Satō; Fourth official: Senri Takahashi

12 June 1993 1st-9	JEF United Ichihara	3–1	Nagoya Grampus Eight	Sapporo Atsubetsu Stadium
12:35 JST (UTC+09)	Ejiri 32'; Pavel 46'; Niimura 57'	J. League	Gotō 45'	Attendance: 20,947; Referee: Martin Bodenham; Assistant referees: Shizuo Takada, Hiroshi Fukuda; Fourth official: Kenichi Koshiyama

16 June 1993 1st-10	Verdy Kawasaki	2–1	JEF United Ichihara	Kawasaki Todoroki Stadium
19:02 JST (UTC+09)	Hanssen 86'; Takeda 89'	J. League	Niimura 13'	Attendance: 10,054; Referee: Shizuo Takada; Assistant referees: Keiichi Sunakawa, Toshiyuki Mayuzumi; Fourth official: Hideaki Ishii

19 June 1993 1st-11	JEF United Ichihara	1–0	Sanfrecce Hiroshima	Ichihara Stadium
17:02 JST (UTC+09)	Littbarski 4'	J. League		Attendance: 9,042; Referee: Kōetsu Kikuchi; Assistant referees: Satoru Ishizawa, Masahiro Katagiri; Fourth official: Shigeaki Yoshiya

23 June 1993 1st-12	Urawa Red Diamonds	2–3	JEF United Ichihara	Urawa Komaba Stadium
19:03 JST (UTC+09)	Mochizuki 17'; Mizuuchi 51'	J. League	Pavel 39', 49', 71'	Attendance: 8,514; Referee: Kōetsu Kikuchi; Assistant referees: Takashi Kunori, Naotsugu Fuse; Fourth official: Morihiko Yamaji

26 June 1993 1st-13	JEF United Ichihara	1–3	Yokohama Marinos	Ichihara Stadium
18:34 JST (UTC+09)	Littbarski 57'	J. League	Díaz 50', 68', 85'	Attendance: 10,116; Referee: Masayoshi Okada; Assistant referees: Takeshi Ōkura, Noboru Ishiyama; Fourth official: Kazuya Isokawa

30 June 1993 1st-14	JEF United Ichihara	0–2	Kashima Antlers	Tochigi Utsunomiya Green Stadium
19:04 JST (UTC+09)		J. League	Kurosaki 29'; Ishii 52'	Attendance: 17,990; Referee: Masahiro Sogawa; Assistant referees: Toshiyuki Mayuzumi, Kazuaki Hamaguchi; Fourth official: Toshimitsu Yoshida

3 July 1993 1st-15	Shimizu S-Pulse	4–1	JEF United Ichihara	Nihondaira Sports Stadium
18:59 JST (UTC+09)	Hasegawa 12', 89'; Mukōjima 18'; Ōenoki 69'	J. League	Makino 74'	Attendance: 9,290; Referee: Shinichirō Obata; Assistant referees: Kazuya Yanagisawa, Yoshio Sawada; Fourth official: Masami Urayama

7 July 1993 1st-16	JEF United Ichihara	1–0 (a.s.d.e.t.)	Yokohama Flügels	Ichihara Stadium
19:01 JST (UTC+09)	Pavel 112'	J. League		Attendance: 8,941; Referee: Tatsumi Ōno; Assistant referees: Kazuaki Hamaguchi, Masahiro Katagiri; Fourth official: Kō Ōishi

10 July 1993 1st-17	Nagoya Grampus Eight	0–1	JEF United Ichihara	Gifu Nagaragawa Stadium
18:34 JST (UTC+09)		J. League	Littbarski 89'	Attendance: 26,370; Referee: Hiroyuki Umemoto; Assistant referees: Yoshikazu Hiroshima, Yoshimi Ogawa; Fourth official: Takayoshi Kashino

14 July 1993 1st-18	JEF United Ichihara	0–1	Gamba Osaka	Ichihara Stadium
19:01 JST (UTC+09)		J. League	Azuma 22'	Attendance: 9,113; Referee: Tetsuya Hamana; Assistant referees: Yū Nakamura, Satoru Ishizawa; Fourth official: Tatsuya Sakata

==== NICOS series ====
24 July 1993 2nd-1	JEF United Ichihara	1–0	Shimizu S-Pulse	Ichihara Stadium
16:02 JST (UTC+09)	Echigo 76'	J. League		Attendance: 9,358; Referee: Tatsumi Ōno; Assistant referees: Masayoshi Okada, Naotsugu Fuse; Fourth official: Makoto Numajiri

31 July 1993 2nd-2	Yokohama Flügels	2–3	JEF United Ichihara	Yokohama Mitsuzawa Football Stadium
19:33 JST (UTC+09)	Takada 35'; Tomishima 88'	J. League	Echigo 22'; Gotō 23'; Littbarski 61'	Attendance: 12,425; Referee: Kōetsu Kikuchi; Assistant referees: Takashi Kunori, Satoru Ishizawa; Fourth official: Katsunori Moriya

4 August 1993 2nd-3	JEF United Ichihara	5–2	Nagoya Grampus Eight	Ichihara Stadium
19:01 JST (UTC+09)	Gotō 20'; Pavel 28' (pen.), 83'; Otze 42', 75'	J. League	Asano 8'; Okayama 68'	Attendance: 10,551; Referee: Tetsuya Hamana; Assistant referees: Hiroshi Fukuda, Toshiyuki Mayuzumi; Fourth official: Junichi Kurisawa

7 August 1993 2nd-4	Verdy Kawasaki	2–1	JEF United Ichihara	Sapporo Atsubetsu Stadium
12:05 JST (UTC+09)	Miura 78'; Bismarck 89'	J. League	Littbarski 36'	Attendance: 21,745; Referee: Shinichirō Obata; Assistant referees: Masayoshi Okada, Takashi Kunori; Fourth official: Eiji Kaneda

14 August 1993 2nd-5	Urawa Red Diamonds	2–3	JEF United Ichihara	Urawa Komaba Stadium
18:31 JST (UTC+09)	Mochizuki 34'; Hashiratani 47'	J. League	Otze 4', 16'; Pavel 84'	Attendance: 9,366; Referee: Hiroyuki Umemoto; Assistant referees: Toshiyuki Mayuzumi, Hisashi Uemura; Fourth official: Ichirō Kuwabara

20 August 1993 2nd-6	Gamba Osaka	2–0	JEF United Ichihara	Expo '70 Commemorative Stadium
19:01 JST (UTC+09)	Matsuyama 79'; Isogai 89'	J. League		Attendance: 20,438; Referee: Kenji Tanaka; Assistant referees: Kazuya Yanagisawa, Yoshitsugu Katayama; Fourth official: Kazunori Okada

25 August 1993 2nd-7	JEF United Ichihara	2–2 (a.s.d.e.t.) (2–4 p)	Yokohama Marinos	Tochigi Utsunomiya Green Stadium
19:00 JST (UTC+09)	Pavel 69'; Echigo 71'	J. League	Díaz 21', 51'	Attendance: 17,226; Referee: Masahiro Sogawa; Assistant referees: Toshiyuki Mayuzumi, Naotsugu Fuse; Fourth official: Akira Itō
	Penalties
	(penalty missed) Littbarski; (penalty missed) Pavel; (penalty scored) [Frank Ordenewitz		(penalty scored) Ihara; (penalty scored) Miura; (penalty scored) Bisconti; (penalty scored) Noda

28 August 1993 2nd-8	JEF United Ichihara	1–3	Sanfrecce Hiroshima	Ichihara Stadium
18:32 JST (UTC+09)	Pavel 18'	J. League	Černý 2'; Kojima 50'; Takagi 68'	Attendance: 10,515; Referee: Masayoshi Okada; Assistant referees: Hiroshi Fukuda, Masahiro Katagiri; Fourth official: Terunobu Kakinuma

3 September 1993 2nd-9	JEF United Ichihara	1–2 (a.s.d.e.t.)	Kashima Antlers	Ichihara Stadium
19:03 JST (UTC+09)	Pavel 52'	J. League	Hasegawa 84'; Zico 94'	Attendance: 10,467; Referee: Kōetsu Kikuchi; Assistant referees: Hiroshi Fukuda, Masahiro Katagiri; Fourth official: Fujirō Masukura

6 November 1993 2nd-10	JEF United Ichihara	1–2 (a.s.d.e.t.)	Yokohama Flügels	Tokyo National Stadium
16:02 JST (UTC+09)	Pavel 33'	J. League	Maeda 80'; Edu 117'	Attendance: 45,748; Referee: Masayoshi Okada; Assistant referees: Noboru Ishiyama, Takeshi Ōkura; Fourth official: Katsuhiko Takayama

10 November 1993 2nd-11	Shimizu S-Pulse	1–1 (a.s.d.e.t.) (3–4 p)	JEF United Ichihara	Kusanagi Athletic Stadium
19:02 JST (UTC+09)	Hasegawa 25'	J. League	Nakanishi 50'	Attendance: 17,540; Referee: Yoshimi Ogawa; Assistant referees: Yoshio Sawada, Kōetsu Kikuchi; Fourth official: Teruhito Kudō
	Penalties
	(penalty scored) Ōta; (penalty scored) Sawanobori; (penalty missed) Miura; (penalty scored) Sugimoto; (penalty missed) Naitō		(penalty missed) Otze; (penalty scored) Pavel; (penalty scored) Kageyama; (penalty scored) Manaka; (penalty scored) Ejiri

13 November 1993 2nd-12	JEF United Ichihara	1–4	Verdy Kawasaki	Miyagi Athletic Stadium
13:03 JST (UTC+09)	Littbarski 23'	J. League	Bismarck 50', 59'; Pereira 75'; Nakamura 86'	Attendance: 19,524; Referee: Kiyoshi Ōta; Assistant referees: Takeshi Ōkura, Masato Nogami; Fourth official: Takayoshi Ōmi

17 November 1993 2nd-13	JEF United Ichihara	2–3 (a.s.d.e.t.)	Urawa Red Diamonds	Tokyo National Stadium
19:00 JST (UTC+09)	Nakanishi 25'; Otze 75' (pen.)	J. League	Fukuda 69'; Rahn 86' (pen.); Mizuuchi 107'	Attendance: 53,570; Referee: Juan Carlos Crespi; Assistant referees: Kiyoshi Ōta, Toshiyuki Mayuzumi; Fourth official: Tatsuya Sakata

20 November 1993 2nd-14	JEF United Ichihara	3–4 (a.s.d.e.t.)	Gamba Osaka	Ichihara Stadium
14:59 JST (UTC+09)	Otze 26', 86'; Pavel 45'	J. League	Isogai 44'; Matsunami 65', 78' 94'	Attendance: 10,395; Referee: Kiichirō Tachi; Assistant referees: Hideo Kikuchi, Masahiro Katagiri; Fourth official: Fujirō Masukura

27 November 1993 2nd-15	Yokohama Marinos	2–0	JEF United Ichihara	Hakatanomori Athletic Stadium
16:03 JST (UTC+09)	Koizumi 28'; Yamada 47'	J. League		Attendance: 27,495; Referee: Juan Carlos Crespi; Assistant referees: Hiroyuki Umemoto, Hideaki Harada; Fourth official: Masatoshi Shibata

1 December 1993 2nd-16	Sanfrecce Hiroshima	2–0	JEF United Ichihara	Hiroshima Stadium
19:02 JST (UTC+09)	Shima 47', 66'	J. League		Attendance: 10,006; Referee: Hiroyuki Umemoto; Assistant referees: Kazuo Kakihana, Hiroshi Tanabe; Fourth official: Kazuyuki Tanimoto

8 December 1993 2nd-17	Kashima Antlers	3–0	JEF United Ichihara	Kashima Soccer Stadium
19:02 JST (UTC+09)	Alcindo 4', 81'; Ōno 27'	J. League		Attendance: 13,282; Referee: Kiyoshi Ōta; Assistant referees: Hiroshi Fukuda, Takashi Kunori; Fourth official: Ichirō Inukai

15 December 1993 2nd-18	Nagoya Grampus Eight	6–0	JEF United Ichihara	Nagoya Mizuho Football Stadium
19:02 JST (UTC+09)	Moriyama 22'; Mori 33'; Hirano 41', 58'; Jorginho 52'; Elivélton 83'	J. League		Attendance: 11,173; Referee: Yoshimi Ogawa; Assistant referees: Takeshi Ōkura, Yasushi Tsuchimoto; Fourth official: Takayoshi Kashino

=== Emperor's Cup ===
5 December 1993 1st Round	JEF United Ichihara	3–0	Osaka University of Commerce	Omiya Football Stadium
: JST (UTC+09)	Pavel ?'; Littbarski ?'; Ejiri ?'

11 December 1993 2nd Round	JEF United Ichihara	2–0	Toshiba	Chiba Sports Stadium
: JST (UTC+09)	Pavel ?'; Littbarski ?'

19 December 1993 Quarterfinals	JEF United Ichihara	1–2 (a.e.t.)	Shimizu S-Pulse	Ehime Matsuyama Athletic Stadium
13:00 JST (UTC+09)	Pavel ?'		Sawanobori ?'; Hasegawa ?'

=== J.League Cup ===
11 September 1993 GL-A-1	Shonan Bellmare	2–1	JEF United Ichihara	Hiratsuka Stadium
18:02 JST (UTC+09)	Betinho 39'; Mirandinha 84'	J. League	Nakanishi 52'	Attendance: 11,136; Referee: Masayoshi Okada; Assistant referees: Takeshi Ōkura, Takashi Kunori; Fourth official: Jōji Kashihara

15 September 1993 GL-A-2	JEF United Ichihara	5–0	Verdy Kawasaki	Niigata Stadium
14:02 JST (UTC+09)	Otze 11', 13'; Nakanishi 20'; Pavel 66' (pen.), 71'	J. League		Attendance: 15,337; Referee: Shinichirō Obata; Assistant referees: Morihisa Yamaguchi, Yoshitsugu Katayama; Fourth official: Masaaki Shimomura

18 September 1993 GL-A-3	Kashima Antlers	1–0	JEF United Ichihara	Kashima Soccer Stadium
18:33 JST (UTC+09)	Hasegawa 52'	J. League		Attendance: 14,571; Referee: Shizuo Takada; Assistant referees: Masahiro Katagiri, Masato Nogami; Fourth official: Ichirō Inukai

GL-A-4	bye

1 October 1993 GL-A-5	JEF United Ichihara	3–4	Gamba Osaka	Ichihara Stadium
19:01 JST (UTC+09)	Pavel 30'; Otze 53'; Nakanishi 85'	J. League	Kusaki 41'; Flavio 44' (pen.); Metkov 50'; Nagashima 82'	Attendance: 9,828; Referee: Tetsuya Hamana; Assistant referees: Hisashi Uemura, Takeshi Ōkura; Fourth official: Terunobu Kakinuma

9 October 1993 GL-A-6	Sanfrecce Hiroshima	0–1	JEF United Ichihara	Hiroshima Big Arch
18:02 JST (UTC+09)		J. League	Ejiri 86'	Attendance: 23,455; Referee: Shinichirō Obata; Assistant referees: Hiroshi Tanabe, Hideaki Harada; Fourth official: Katsuya Minokoshi

16 October 1993 GL-A-7	JEF United Ichihara	0–1	Kashiwa Reysol	Ichihara Stadium
18:34 JST (UTC+09)		J. League	Careca 55'	Attendance: 9,022; Referee: Shizuo Takada; Assistant referees: Hiroshi Fukuda, Takashi Kunori; Fourth official: Kaoru Nagase

== Player statistics ==
Pos.	Nat.	Player	D.o.B. (Age)	Height / Weight	J.League		Emperor's Cup		J.League Cup		Total	
Pos.	Nat.	Player	D.o.B. (Age)	Height / Weight	Apps	Goals	Apps	Goals	Apps	Goals	Apps	Goals
GK	(Japan)	Yoshio Katō	August 1, 1957 (aged 35)	180 cm / 76 kg	18	0	0	0	3	0	21	0
MF	(Germany)	Littbarski	April 16, 1960 (aged 33)	168 cm / 64 kg	35	9	3	2	6	0	44	11
MF	(Japan)	Masaaki Kanno	August 15, 1960 (aged 32)	175 cm / 71 kg	2	0	0	0	1	0	3	0
MF	(Japan)	Masanao Sasaki	June 19, 1962 (aged 30)	173 cm / 67 kg	18	1	0	0	0	0	18	1
DF	(Japan) (Note: He was naturalized in Japan in June 1993.)	Michel Miyazawa	July 14, 1963 (aged 29)	176 cm / 68 kg	19	0	0	0	4	0	23	0
FW	(Czech Republic)	Pavel	October 7, 1963 (aged 29)	178 cm / 72 kg	31	16	3	3	5	3	39	22
MF	(Japan)	Yoshikazu Gotō	February 20, 1964 (aged 29)	170 cm / 65 kg	19	2	3	0	4	0	26	2
MF	(Japan)	Tōru Yoshida	May 17, 1965 (aged 27)	177 cm / 74 kg	26	0	2	0	5	0	33	0
MF	(Czech Republic)	Franta	June 19, 1965 (aged 27)	174 cm / 72 kg	14	1	0	0	0	0	14	1
DF	(Japan)	Kazuya Igarashi	October 24, 1965 (aged 27)	177 cm / 71 kg	7	0	1	0	2	0	10	0
MF	(Japan)	Kazuo Echigo	December 28, 1965 (aged 27)	171 cm / 66 kg	22	3	3	0	3	0	28	3
DF	(Japan)	Masanaga Kageyama	May 23, 1967 (aged 25)	181 cm / 78 kg	29	1	3	0	6	0	38	1
DF	(Japan)	Yūji Sakakura	June 7, 1967 (aged 25)	178 cm / 68 kg	25	0	0	0	0	0	25	0
MF	(Japan)	Atsuhiko Ejiri	July 12, 1967 (aged 25)	177 cm / 68 kg	36	4	3	1	3	1	42	6
DF	(Japan)	Naoki Honmachi	July 31, 1968 (aged 24)	176 cm / 74 kg	0	0		0	0	0		0
FW	(Japan)	Keisuke Makino	April 11, 1969 (aged 24)	175 cm / 71 kg	10	2	0	0	1	0	11	2
DF	(Japan)	Mikio Manaka	May 22, 1969 (aged 23)	171 cm / 70 kg	6	0	1	0	1	0	8	0
MF	(Japan)	Masanori Kizawa	June 2, 1969 (aged 23)	170 cm / 62 kg	10	0	2	0	0	0	12	0
FW	(Japan)	Kei Hirata	September 9, 1969 (aged 23)	172 cm / 66 kg	0	0		0	1	0		0
GK	(Japan)	Masahiro Ōta	April 28, 1970 (aged 23)	185 cm / 79 kg	5	0	0	0	3	0	8	0
FW	(Japan)	Yasuhiko Niimura	May 11, 1970 (aged 23)	175 cm / 68 kg	25	2	2	0	4	0	31	2
GK	(Japan)	Kenichi Shimokawa	May 14, 1970 (aged 23)	187 cm / 88 kg	14	0	3	0	0	0	17	0
DF	(Japan)	Tadashi Koya	May 24, 1970 (aged 22)	173 cm / 70 kg	3	0	1	0	2	0	6	0
DF	(Japan)	Hiroshi Miyazawa	November 22, 1970 (aged 22)	183 cm / 80 kg	13	0	3	0	6	0	22	0
MF	(Japan)	Kazuyuki Kyōya	August 13, 1971 (aged 21)	172 cm / 74 kg	0	0		0	1	0		0
FW	(North Korea) (Note: In J.League and domestic competitions, he was considered as a Japanese player.)	Shin Je-Bon	September 27, 1971 (aged 21)	176 cm / 70 kg	7	0	1	0	0	0	8	0
MF	(Japan)	Shinichi Mutō	April 2, 1973 (aged 20)	168 cm / 58 kg	0	0		0	0	0		0
FW	(Japan)	Munetada Hosaka	May 12, 1973 (aged 20)	169 cm / 61 kg	0	0		0	0	0		0
DF	(Brazil)	Sandro	May 19, 1973 (aged 19)	186 cm / 75 kg	4	0	0	0	0	0	4	0
MF	(Japan)	Eisuke Nakanishi	June 23, 1973 (aged 19)	173 cm / 68 kg	32	2	1	0	6	3	39	5
GK	(Japan)	Akio Sano	February 18, 1974 (aged 19)	178 cm / 74 kg	0	0		0	0	0		0
MF	(Japan)	Hideyuki Sudō	April 5, 1974 (aged 19)	171 cm / 67 kg	0	0		0	0	0		0
GK	(Japan)	Tomonori Tateishi	April 22, 1974 (aged 19)	181 cm / 72 kg	0	0		0	0	0		0
MF	(Japan)	Shigeyuki Satō	May 5, 1974 (aged 19)	165 cm / 57 kg	0	0		0	0	0		0
FW	(Japan)	Hiroyuki Maeda	May 22, 1974 (aged 18)	182 cm / 75 kg	0	0		0	0	0		0
DF	(Japan)	Hidetatsu Satō	June 18, 1974 (aged 18)	171 cm / 60 kg	0	0		0	0	0		0
DF	(Japan)	Jun Mizuno	August 7, 1974 (aged 18)	173 cm / 66 kg	0	0		0	0	0		0
DF	(Japan)	Teppei Isaka	October 23, 1974 (aged 18)	182 cm / 72 kg	0	0		0	0	0		0
FW	(Japan)	Kinya Takehara	November 16, 1974 (aged 18)	172 cm / 62 kg	0	0		0	0	0		0
FW	(Germany)	Otze †	March 25, 1965 (aged 28)	180 cm / 76 kg	15	7	3	0	6	3	24	10

- † player(s) joined the team after the opening of this season.

== Transfers ==
In:

No.	Pos.	Nation	Player
—	GK	JPN	Masahiro Ōta (from Doshisha University)
—	GK	JPN	Tomonori Tateishi (from Horikoshi High School)
—	DF	JPN	Tadashi Koya (from Aoyama Gakuin University)
—	DF	JPN	Hiroshi Miyazawa (from Chuo University)
—	MF	GER	Pierre Littbarski (from 1. FC Köln)
—	FW	JPN	Yasuhiko Niimura (from Kokushikan University)
—	DF	JPN	Hidetatsu Satō (from Shizuoka Gakuen Senior High School)
—	DF	JPN	Jun Mizuno (from Funabashi Municipal High School)
—	DF	JPN	Teppei Isaka (from Mito Tanki Daigaku fuzoku High School)
—	MF	JPN	Hideyuki Sudō (from Sendai Ikuei Gakuen High School)
—	MF	JPN	Shigeyuki Satō (from Akita Keizai Hoka University Fuzoku High School)
—	FW	PRK	Shin Che-Bon (from Tokyo Korean Senior High School)
—	FW	JPN	Hiroyuki Maeda (from Shonan Institute of Technology High School)
—	FW	JPN	Kinya Takehara (from Kobe Koryo Gakuen High School)

Out:

No.	Pos.	Nation	Player
—	DF	JPN	Kenji Yamamoto (to NTT Kanto)
—	DF	JPN	Hiroki Shibuya
—	DF	JPN	Masayuki Miura (to PJM Futures)
—	MF	CZE	Marty
—	FW	JPN	Yūsuke Minoguchi (to PJM Futures)
—	MF	JPN	Saburo Iwamoto
—	MF	JPN	Yūji Iwasaki
—	FW	JPN	Satoru Kokubo
—	FW	JPN	Mitsunori Maesawa

== Transfers during the season ==
=== In ===
- (Germany) Frank Ordenewitz (Otze) (from 1. FC Köln on July)

== Other pages ==
- (in Japanese) J. League official site
- (in Japanese) JEF United Ichihara Chiba official web site
