= 1992 JEF United Ichihara season =

JEF United Ichihara
1992 season
- Manager: Yoshikazu Nagai
- Stadium: Ichihara Stadium (under repair)
- Emperor's Cup: Quarterfinals
- J.League Cup: GL 6th
- Top goalscorer: League: All: Řehák (5)

1992 JEF United Ichihara season

== Team name ==
Club name
JR East Furukawa Football Club
Nickname
JEF United

== Competitions ==
Competitions	Position
Emperor's Cup	Quarterfinals
J.League Cup	GL 6th / 10 clubs

== Domestic results ==
=== Emperor's Cup ===
5 December 1992 1st Round	Otsuka Pharmaceutical	0–3	JEF United Ichihara	Kochi Haruno Athletic Stadium
: JST (UTC+09:00)			Pavel ?', ?'; Echigo ?'

6 December 1992 2nd Round	Keio University	0–1	JEF United Ichihara	Kochi Haruno Athletic Stadium
: JST (UTC+09:00)			Kyōya ?'

20 December 1992 Quarterfinals	Fujita	1–0	JEF United Ichihara	Nishigaoka Soccer Stadium
: JST (UTC+09:00)	T. Iwamoto 36'

=== J.League Cup ===
5 September 1992 GL-1	Urawa Red Diamonds	2–3 (sudden-death) (a.e.t.)	JEF United Ichihara	Omiya Football Stadium
18:02 JST (UTC+09:00)	Mochizuki 65'; Hashiratani 82'	J. League	Řehák 35' 93'; Sasaki 74'	Attendance: 4,934; Referee: Hideo Kikuchi; Assistant referees: Hitoshi Yamada; Kimio Izaki; Fourth official: Morihiko Yamaji

9 September 1992 GL-2	Gamba Osaka	1–0	JEF United Ichihara	Kobe Central Football Stadium
19:00 JST (UTC+09:00)	Matsuyama 51'	J. League		Attendance: 2,760; Referee: Shinichirō Obata; Assistant referees: Hiroyuki Umemoto; Keiji Hayashi; Fourth official: Toshiyuki Osame

13 September 1992 GL-3	JEF United Ichihara	1–0 (sudden-death) (a.e.t.)	Kashima Antlers	Ota Stadium
14:02 JST (UTC+09:00)	Mysliveček 103'	J. League		Attendance: 6,829; Referee: Yū Nakamura; Assistant referees: Mitsuru Satō; Takashi Kunori; Fourth official: Hiromitsu Hirayama

18 September 1992 GL-4	JEF United Ichihara	0–1	Nagoya Grampus Eight	Hiratsuka Stadium
19:01 JST (UTC+09:00)		J. League	Shimamura 66'	Attendance: 4,049; Referee: Masayoshi Okada; Assistant referees: Tetsuya Hamana; Hiroshi Fukuda; Fourth official: Hiromitsu Hirayama

23 September 1992 GL-5	JEF United Ichihara	1–0 (sudden-death) (a.e.t.)	Verdy Kawasaki	Chiba Sports Stadium
14:04 JST (UTC+09:00)	Řehák 95'	J. League		Attendance: 16,607; Referee: Tatsumi Ōno; Assistant referees: Kōetsu Kikuchi; Masahiro Katagiri; Fourth official: Yasuhiro Matsuzaki

27 September 1992 GL-6	Sanfrecce Hiroshima	0–1	JEF United Ichihara	Hiroshima Stadium
19:00 JST (UTC+09:00)		J. League	Echigo 52'	Attendance: 4,388; Referee: Yōtarō Moritsu; Assistant referees: Kazunori Okada; Hiroshi Tanabe; Fourth official: Masahiro Katsuyama

3 October 1992 GL-7	Yokohama Flügels	0–0 (sudden-death) (a.e.t.) (0–1 p)	JEF United Ichihara	Nishigaoka Soccer Stadium
15:00 JST (UTC+09:00)		J. League		Attendance: 4,650; Referee: Masahiro Sogawa; Assistant referees: Kōetsu Kikuchi; Takashi Kunori; Fourth official: Senri Takahashi
	Penalties
	(penalty missed) Ikenoue		(penalty scored) Řehák

7 October 1992 GL-8	JEF United Ichihara	0–1	Yokohama Marinos	Nishigaoka Soccer Stadium
19:01 JST (UTC+09:00)		J. League	Hirakawa 33'	Attendance: 3,551; Referee: Tatsumi Ōno; Assistant referees: Takeshi Ōkura; Kazuaki Hamaguchi; Fourth official: Hiromitsu Hirayama

11 October 1992 GL-9	Shimizu S-Pulse	2–2 (sudden-death) (a.e.t.) (1–0 p)	JEF United Ichihara	Nihondaira Sports Stadium
14:00 JST (UTC+09:00)	Marco Antonio 15'; Horiike 87'	J. League	Makino 48'; Echigo 74'	Attendance: 8,228; Referee: Masayoshi Okada; Assistant referees: Mitsuru Satō; Yoshimi Ogawa; Fourth official: Masami Urayama
	Penalties
	(penalty scored) Toninho		(penalty missed) Řehák

== Player statistics ==
Pos.	Nat.	Player	D.o.B. (Age)	Height / Weight	Emperor's Cup		J.League Cup		Total	
Pos.	Nat.	Player	D.o.B. (Age)	Height / Weight	Apps	Goals	Apps	Goals	Apps	Goals
GK	(Japan)	Yoshio Katō	August 1, 1957 (aged 35)	180 cm / 76 kg		0	4	0		0
MF	(Japan)	Masaaki Kanno	August 15, 1960 (aged 32)	175 cm / 71 kg		0	7	0		0
MF	(Japan)	Masanao Sasaki	June 19, 1962 (aged 30)	173 cm / 67 kg		0	6	1		1
DF	(France)	Michel Miyazawa	July 14, 1963 (aged 29)	176 cm / 68 kg		0	9	0		0
FW	(Czech Republic)	Pavel Řehák	October 7, 1963 (aged 28)	178 cm / 72 kg		2	9	3		5
MF	(Japan)	Yoshikazu Gotō	February 20, 1964 (aged 28)	170 cm / 65 kg		0	9	0		0
MF	(Japan)	Tōru Yoshida	May 17, 1965 (aged 27)	177 cm / 74 kg		0	7	0		0
MF	(Czech Republic)	František Mysliveček	June 19, 1965 (aged 27)	174 cm / 72 kg		0	9	1		1
FW	(Japan)	Yūsuke Minoguchi	August 23, 1965 (aged 27)	181 cm / 78 kg		0	0	0		0
DF	(Japan)	Kenji Yamamoto	August 28, 1965 (aged 27)	161 cm / 58 kg		0	1	0		0
DF	(Japan)	Kazuya Igarashi	October 24, 1965 (aged 26)	177 cm / 71 kg		0	2	0		0
MF	(Japan)	Kazuo Echigo	December 28, 1965 (aged 26)	171 cm / 66 kg		1	9	2		3
DF	(Japan)	Masayuki Miura	November 4, 1966 (aged 25)	168 cm / 63 kg		0	0	0		0
DF	(Japan)	Hiroki Shibuya	November 30, 1966 (aged 25)	173 cm / 67 kg		0	0	0		0
DF	(Japan)	Masanaga Kageyama	May 23, 1967 (aged 25)	181 cm / 78 kg	3	0	0	0	3	0
DF	(Japan)	Yūji Sakakura	June 7, 1967 (aged 25)	178 cm / 68 kg		0	9	0		0
MF	(Japan)	Atsuhiko Ejiri	July 12, 1967 (aged 25)	177 cm / 68 kg		0	9	0		0
FW	(Japan)	Mitsunori Maesawa	December 20, 1967 (aged 24)	175 cm / 65 kg		0	0	0		0
FW	(Japan)	Satoru Kokubo	December 29, 1967 (aged 24)	172 cm / 65 kg		0	0	0		0
MF	(Czech Republic)	Martin Hřídel	May 22, 1968 (aged 24)	170 cm / 65 kg		0	0	0		0
DF	(Japan)	Naoki Honmachi	July 31, 1968 (aged 24)	176 cm / 74 kg		0	0	0		0
MF	(Japan)	Saburo Iwamoto	January 14, 1969 (aged 23)	163 cm / 61 kg		0	0	0		0
FW	(Japan)	Keisuke Makino	April 11, 1969 (aged 23)	175 cm / 71 kg		0	5	1		1
DF	(Japan)	Mikio Manaka	May 22, 1969 (aged 23)	171 cm / 70 kg		0	0	0		0
DF	(Japan)	Masanori Kizawa	June 2, 1969 (aged 23)	170 cm / 62 kg		0	0	0		0
FW	(Japan)	Kei Hirata	September 9, 1969 (aged 22)	172 cm / 66 kg		0	0	0		0
GK	(Japan)	Kenichi Shimokawa	May 14, 1970 (aged 22)	187 cm / 88 kg		0	5	0		0
MF	(Japan)	Kazuyuki Kyōya	August 13, 1971 (aged 21)	172 cm / 74 kg		1	0	0		1
FW	(North Korea)	Shin Je-Bon	September 27, 1971 (aged 20)	cm / - kg		0	0	0		0
MF	(Japan)	Yūji Iwasaki	June 18, 1972 (aged 20)	167 cm / 61 kg		0	0	0		0
MF	(Japan)	Shinichi Mutō	April 2, 1973 (aged 19)	168 cm / 58 kg		0	0	0		0
FW	(Japan)	Munetada Hosaka	May 12, 1973 (aged 19)	169 cm / 61 kg		0	0	0		0
MF	(Brazil)	Sandro	May 19, 1973 (aged 19)	186 cm / 75 kg		0	8	0		0
DF	(Japan)	Eisuke Nakanishi	June 23, 1973 (aged 19)	173 cm / 68 kg		0	7	0		0
GK	(Japan)	Akio Sano	February 18, 1974 (aged 18)	178 cm / 74 kg		0	0	0		0

== Transfers ==
In:

No.	Pos.	Nation	Player
—	DF	FRA	Michel Miyazawa (from Fujita)
—	DF	JPN	Eisuke Nakanishi (from Yokkaichi Chuo Technical High School)
—	MF	JPN	Masanao Sasaki (from ANA SC)
—	MF	CZE	František Mysliveček (from Bohemians)
—	MF	BRA	Sandro (from Shibuya Kyouiku Gakuen Makuhari Senior High School)
—	FW	JPN	Kei Hirata (from Sendai College)
—	GK	JPN	Akio Sano (from Noboribetsu Ohtani High School)
—	DF	JPN	Mikio Manaka (from Ibaraki University)
—	MF	JPN	Saburo Iwamoto (from Teikyo Senior High School)
—	MF	JPN	Shinichi Mutō (from Sendai Ikuei Gakuen High School)
—	FW	JPN	Munetada Hosaka (from Akita Shogyo High School)

Out:

No.	Pos.	Nation	Player
5	DF	JPN	Hisashi Kaneko
15	DF	JPN	Hiroaki Kumon (to Fujita)
24	MF	JPN	Futoshi Kobayashi
31	GK	JPN	Keiji Kageyama

== Transfers during the season ==
=== In ===
none

=== Out ===
none

== Other pages ==
- (in Japanese) J. League official site
- (in Japanese) JEF United Ichihara Chiba official site
