= Japan Championships in Athletics =

Annual outdoor track and field competition

- Current season, competition or edition: 2026 Japan Championships in Athletics
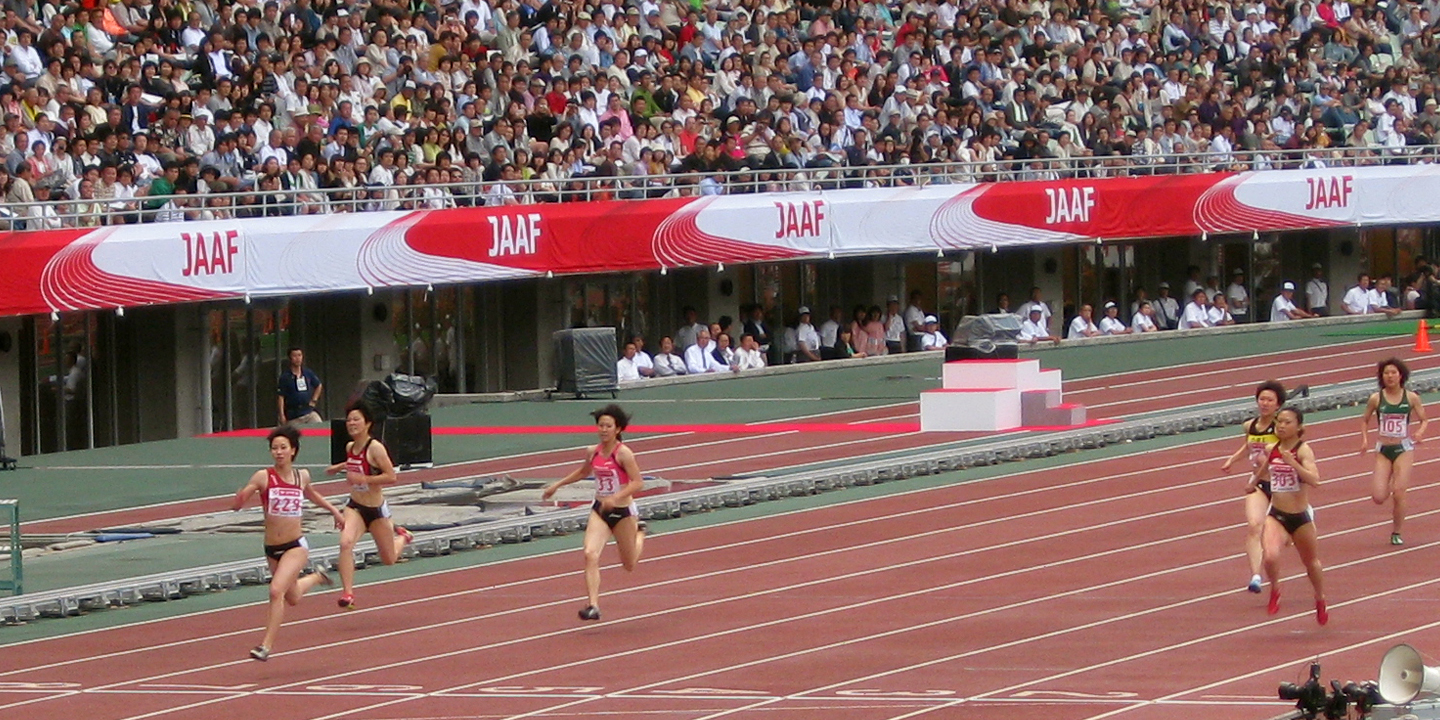
- Women's sprints at the 2012 championships
- Sport: Track and field
- Founded: 1913
- Country: Japan
- Broadcaster: NHK World-Japan
- Website: JAAF Official website

The Japan Championships in Athletics (日本陸上競技選手権大会, Nihon Rikujō Kyōgi Sensyuken Taikai) is an annual outdoor track and field competition, organized by Japan Association of Athletics Federations. Currently it takes place in June or July. The competition is also for the qualifying trial for the Japanese national team of international competitions.

== History ==
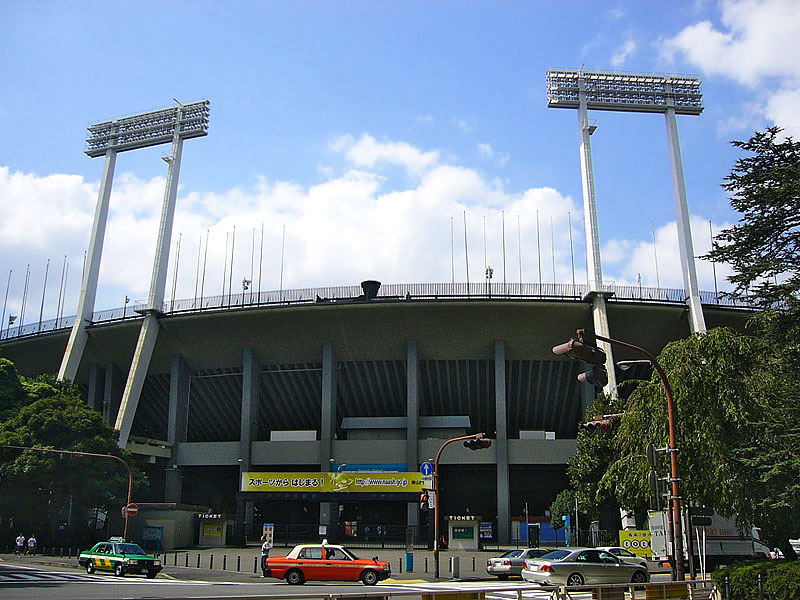
National Olympic Stadium

In 1913, it was first held in Tokyo as Zenkoku Rikujō Taikai (全国陸上大会) by the Japan Amateur Sports Association. In 1925, the Japan Amateur Athletic Federation (JAAF) was organized. Since then, the competition have been organized by the JAAF.

== Events ==
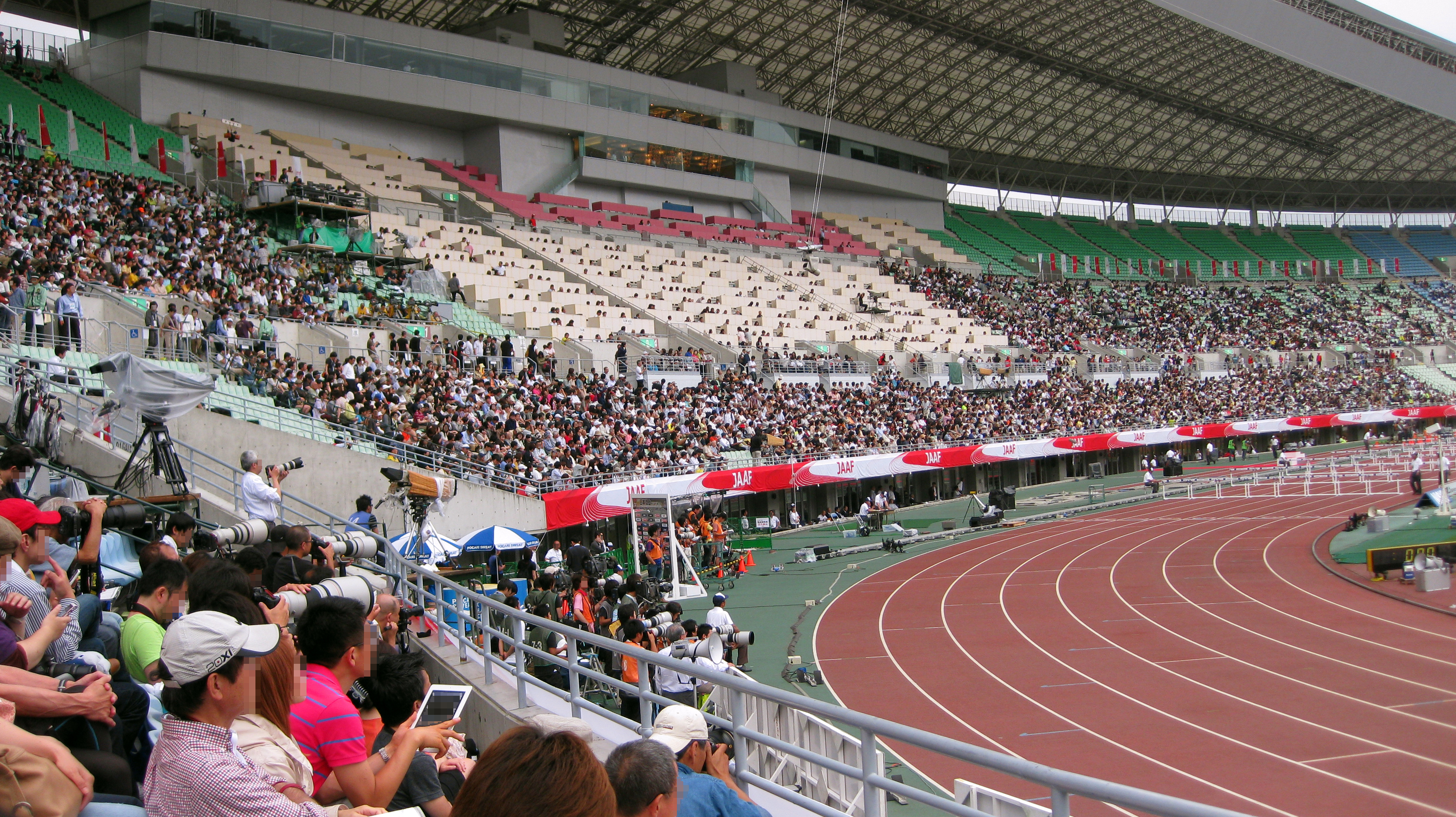
In 2012, Nagai Stadium hosted the 96th edition of the championships.

The following athletics events feature on the national championships.

- Sprint: 100 m, 200 m, 400 m
- Middle distance: 800 m, 1500 m
- Long distance: 5000 m, 10,000 m
- Hurdles: 100 m hurdles, 110 m hurdles, 400 m hurdles, 3000 m SC
- Jumps: Long jump, Triple jump, High jump, Pole vault
- Throws: Shot put, Discus throw, Hammer throw, Javelin throw

=== Other events ===
As of 2016, the following events are separate competitions for date and venue from the outdoor championships.

- Combined event: Decathlon and Heptathlon. Nihon Rikujō Kyōgi Sensyuken Taikai Konsei (日本陸上競技選手権大会混成) meaning Japan Championships in Athletics Combined event, it takes place in June.
- Relays: 4 × 100 m relays and 4 × 400 m relays. Nihon Rikujō Kyōgi Sensyuken Taikai Relay Kyōgi Taikai (日本陸上競技選手権大会リレー競技大会) meaning Japan Championships in Athletics Relay, it takes place in October.
- Marathon: The competition differ by year, is designated as a national championships.
- Race walk: 20 km and 50 km. Nihon Rikujō Kyōgi Sensyuken Taikai 20 kilometres Kyōho (日本陸上競技選手権大会20km競歩) meaning Japan Championships in Athletics 20 kilometres Race Walk, it takes place in Kobe in February. Nihon Rikujō Kyōgi Sensyuken Taikai 50 kilometres Kyōho (日本陸上競技選手権大会50km競歩) meaning Japan Championships in Athletics 50 kilometres Race Walk, it takes place in Wajima, Ishikawa in April.
- Cross country: Nihon Rikujō Kyōgi Sensyuken Taikai Cross country Kyōsō (日本陸上競技選手権大会クロスカントリー競走) meaning Japan Championships in Athletics Cross country, formerly known as Fukuoka International Cross Country, it takes place in Fukuoka in February.

== Editions ==
Edition
	Venue	Stadium	Date
30	Kyoto	Nishikyogoku Athletic Stadium	2–3 November 1946
31	Tobata, Fukuoka	Sayagatani Stadium	4–5 October 1947
32	Yamagata	Yamagata Prefectural Stadium	14–15 August 1948
33	Kashihara, Nara	Kashihara Koen Stadium	27–28 August 1949
34	Kagoshima	Kamoike Stadium	7–8 October 1950
35	Nagoya	Mizuho Athletic Stadium	13–14 October, 1951
36	Gifu	Gifu Prefectural Stadium	4–5 October 1952
37	Shinjuku, Tokyo	Meiji Jingu Gaien Stadium	10–11 October 1953
38	Shinjuku, Tokyo	Meiji Jingu Gaien Stadium	24–26 September 1954
39	Kobe	Kobe Oji Stadium	22–23 October 1955
40	Sendai, Miyagi	Miyagino Stadium	6–7 October 1956
41	Kobe	Kobe Oji Stadium	5–6 October 1957
42	Shinjuku, Tokyo	National Olympic Stadium	11–12 October 1958
43	Shinjuku, Tokyo	National Olympic Stadium	2–3 August 1959
44	Shinjuku, Tokyo	National Olympic Stadium	1–3 July 1960
45	Shinjuku, Tokyo	National Olympic Stadium	30 June – 2 July 1961
46	Omiya, Saitama	Ōmiya Velodrome	12–14 October 1962
47	Shinjuku, Tokyo	National Olympic Stadium	12–15 October 1963
48	Shinjuku, Tokyo	National Olympic Stadium	3–5 July 1964
49	Shinjuku, Tokyo	National Olympic Stadium	15–17 October 1965
50	Shinjuku, Tokyo	National Olympic Stadium	16–18 September 1966
51	Shinjuku, Tokyo	National Olympic Stadium	22–24 September 1967
52	Setagaya, Tokyo	Komazawa Olympic Park Stadium	29 August – 1 September 1968
53	Ageo, Saitama	Ageo Stadium	19–21 September 1969
54	Shinjuku, Tokyo	National Olympic Stadium	29–31 May 1970
55	Shinjuku, Tokyo	National Olympic Stadium	28–30 May 1971
56	Shinjuku, Tokyo	National Olympic Stadium	2–4 June 1972
57	Chiba, Chiba	Chiba Sports Center Stadium	1–3 June 1973
58	Shinjuku, Tokyo	National Olympic Stadium	31 May – 2 June 1974
59	Shinjuku, Tokyo	National Olympic Stadium	30 May – 1 June 1975
60	Shinjuku, Tokyo	National Olympic Stadium	4–6 June 1976
61	Shinjuku, Tokyo	National Olympic Stadium	28–30 October 1977
62	Shinjuku, Tokyo	National Olympic Stadium	28–29 October 1978
63	Shinjuku, Tokyo	National Olympic Stadium	27–28 October 1979
64	Shinjuku, Tokyo	National Olympic Stadium	25–26 October 1980
65	Shinjuku, Tokyo	National Olympic Stadium	24–25 October 1981
66	Shinjuku, Tokyo	National Olympic Stadium	11 September – 12 September 1982
67	Shinjuku, Tokyo	National Olympic Stadium	1–2 October 1983
68	Shinjuku, Tokyo	National Olympic Stadium	20–21 October 1984
69	Shinjuku, Tokyo	National Olympic Stadium	31 May – 2 June 1985
70	Shinjuku, Tokyo	National Olympic Stadium	30 May – 1 June 1986
71	Shinjuku, Tokyo	National Olympic Stadium	13–14 June 1987
72	Shinjuku, Tokyo	National Olympic Stadium	17–19 June 1988
73	Shinjuku, Tokyo	National Olympic Stadium	17–18 June 1989
74	Chiba, Chiba	Chiba Sports Center Stadium	9–10 June 1990
75	Shinjuku, Tokyo	National Olympic Stadium	13–16 June 1991
76	Shinjuku, Tokyo	National Olympic Stadium	12–14 June 1992
77	Shinjuku, Tokyo	National Olympic Stadium	11–13 June 1993
78	Shinjuku, Tokyo	National Olympic Stadium	10–12 June 1994
79	Shinjuku, Tokyo	National Olympic Stadium	9–11 June 1995
80	Osaka	Nagai Stadium	6–9 June 1996
81	Shinjuku, Tokyo	National Olympic Stadium	2–5 October 1997
82	Kumamoto, Kumamoto	Kumamoto Athletics Stadium	30 September – 12 October 1998
83	Shizuoka, Shizuoka	Kusanagi Stadium	1–3 October 1999
84	Rifu, Miyagi	Miyagi Stadium	6–8 October 2000
85	Shinjuku, Tokyo	National Olympic Stadium	8–10 June 2001
86	Kanazawa, Ishikawa	Ishikawa Kanazawa Stadium	7–9 June 2002
87	Yokohama	International Stadium Yokohama	6–8 June 2003
88	Tottori, Tottori	Tottori Athletics Stadium	4–6 June 2004
89	Shinjuku, Tokyo	National Olympic Stadium	2–5 June 2005
90	Kobe	Kobe Universiade Memorial Stadium	30 June – 2 July 2006
91	Osaka	Nagai Stadium	29 June – 1 July 2007
92	Kawasaki, Kanagawa	Todoroki Athletics Stadium	26–29 June 2008
93	Hiroshima	Hiroshima Big Arch	25–28 June 2009
94	Marugame, Kagawa	Kagawa Marugame Stadium	4–6 June 2010
95	Kumagaya, Saitama	Kumagaya Athletic Stadium	10–12 June 2011
96	Osaka	Nagai Stadium	8–10 June 2012
97	Chōfu, Tokyo	Ajinomoto Stadium	7–9 June 2013
98	Fukushima, Fukushima	Fukushima Azuma Stadium	6–8 June 2014
99	Niigata, Niigata	Denka Big Swan Stadium	26–28 June 2015
100	Nagoya	Mizuho Athletic Stadium	24–26 June 2016
101	Osaka	Yanmar Stadium Nagai	23–25 June 2017
102	Fukuoka	Hakatanomori Athletic Stadium	22–24 June 2018
103	Yamaguchi	Ishin Me-Life Stadium	27–30 June 2019
104	Niigata	Denka Big Swan Stadium	1–3 October 2020
105	Osaka	Yanmar Stadium Nagai	24–27 June 2021
106	Osaka	Yanmar Stadium Nagai	6–9 June 2022
107	Osaka	Yanmar Stadium Nagai	1–4 June 2023
108	Niigata	Denka Big Swan Stadium	27–30 June 2024
109	Tokyo	Japan National Stadium	4–6 July 2025
110	Nagoya	Paloma Mizuho Stadium	12–14 June 2026

== Records ==
Championships records
Event	Men					Women				
Event	Athlete	Record	Date	Location	Ref.	Athlete	Record	Date	Location	Ref.
100 m	Abdul Hakim Sani Brown	10.02 (−0.3 m/s)	28 June 2019	Fukuoka		Pauline Davis (BAH)	11.29 (±0.0 m/s)	1991	Shinjuku, Tokyo	
200 m	Shingo Suetsugu	20.03 NR (+0.6 m/s)	2003	Yokohama		Pauline Davis (BAH)	22.73 (+0.7 m/s)	1991	Shinjuku, Tokyo	
400 m	Susumu Takano	44.78	16 June 1991	Shinjuku, Tokyo		Asami Tanno	51.93	2005	Shinjuku, Tokyo	
800 m	Ko Ochiai	1:45.82	29 June 2024	Niigata		Rin Kubo	1:59.52 NR	5 July 2025	Shinjuku, Tokyo	
1500 m	Kazuto Iizawa	3:36.81	6 July 2025	Shinjuku, Tokyo		Nozomi Tanaka	4:01.44	28 June 2024	Niigata	
5000 m	Tatsuhiko Ito	13:13.56	28 June 2024	Niigata		Nozomi Tanaka	14:59.02	4 July 2025	Shinjuku, Tokyo	
10,000 m	Kazuya Shiojiri	27:09.80 NR	10 December 2023	Shinjuku, Tokyo		Hitomi Niiya	30:20.44 NR	4 December 2020	Osaka	
Sprint Hurdles; 110 m M / 100 m W	Shunsuke Izumiya	13.04 (−0.9 m/s)	4 June 2023	Osaka		Mako Fukube	12.75 (+0.8 m/s)	29 June 2024	Niigata	
Sprint Hurdles; 110 m M / 100 m W	Shunsuke Izumiya	13.04 (−0.9 m/s)	4 June 2023	Osaka		Mako Fukube	12.75 (±0.0 m/s)	5 July 2025	Shinjuku, Tokyo	
400 m hurdles	Ken Toyoda	47.99	28 June 2024	Niigata		Nicoleta Căruțașu (ROM)	55.78	1991	Shinjuku, Tokyo	
3000 m steeplechase	Ryuji Miura	8:14.47	11 June 2022	Osaka		Yuno Yamanaka	9:41.84	26 June 2021	Osaka	
High jump	Naoyuki Daigo	2.33 m NR	2 July 2006	Kobe		Megumi Sato	1.94 m	1988	Shinjuku, Tokyo	
Pole vault	Igor Potapovich (URS); Daichi Sawano	5.80 m	1990; 2004	Chiba; Tottori		Misaki Morota	4.41 m	28 June 2024	Niigata	
Long jump	Yuki Hashioka	8.36 m (+0.6 m/s)	27 June 2021	Osaka		Larysa Berezhna (URS)	7.03 m NWI	1990	Chiba	
Triple jump	Norifumi Yamashita	17.15 m NWI	1986	Shinjuku, Tokyo		Mariko Morimoto	14.16 m (+0.7 m/s) NR	3 June 2023	Osaka	
Shot put	Sergey Nikolayev (URS)	19.02 m	1990	Chiba		Zhen Wenhua (CHN)	19.40 m	1991	Shinjuku, Tokyo	
Discus throw	Adewale Olukoju (NGR)	64.20 m	1991	Shinjuku, Tokyo		Min Chunfeng (CHN)	59.94 m	1991	Shinjuku, Tokyo	
Hammer throw	Koji Murofushi	83.29 m	2003	Yokohama		Raika Murakami	66.88 m	5 July 2025	Shinjuku, Tokyo	
Javelin throw	Yuta Sakiyama	87.16 m	5 July 2025	Shinjuku, Tokyo		Haruka Kitaguchi	63.68 m	June 2019	Fukuoka	
Combined event Decathlon M / Heptathlon W	Keisuke Ushiro	8308 pts NR	31 May – 1 June 2014	Nagano, Nagano		Yuki Nakata	5962 pts NR	4–5 June 2004	Tottori	
4 × 100 m R	Hosei University	38.79	2015	Yokohama		Toho Bank	44.37	2012	Yokohama	
4 × 100 m R	(Yoshiya Nishigaki, Kazuma Ōseto, Takuto Yano, Takuya Nagata)					(Mayu Sato, Asami Chiba, Sayaka Aoki, Mayumi Watanabe)				
4 × 400 m R	Tsukuba University	3:03.96	2023	Shinjuku, Tokyo		Fukushima University	3:34.70	2007	Yokohama	
4 × 400 m R	(Kohei Kanno, Shinya Hayashi, Ryo Yoshikawa, Kenki Imaizumi)					(Natsumi Watanabe, Asami Tanno, Sayaka Aoki, Saika Kindaichi)				
Marathon	Atsushi Fujita	2:06:51	2000	Fukuoka		Mao Ichiyama	2:20:29	2020	Nagoya	
20 km W	Toshikazu Yamanishi	1:16:10 NR	16 February 2025	Kobe		Nanako Fujii	1:26:33 NR	16 February 2025	Kobe	
35 km W	Masatora Kawano	2:21:47 NR	27 October 2024	Takahata		Kumiko Okada	2:44:11 NR	16 April 2023	Wajima	
50 km W	Yusuke Suzuki	3:39:07	2019	Wajima		—	—	—	—	—

== Eligibility ==
As of 2020, registered athletes of Japan Association of Athletics Federations (including foreigners who are born and raised in Japan) who have Japanese nationality must fall in either of these conditions.

- Winner of the previous Japan Championships in Athletics
- Broken the participation standard record A (a common standard set mainly by the tournament organizer for athletes as a standard for permitting participation and participation)
- Won the 3rd place in each category in the 2019 regional championships (excluding the Tokyo championships) and met the participation standard record B (a lower standard compared to standard record A)

== See also ==
- List of Japanese records in athletics
- Category:National sport of athletics champions
