= Toru Yoshida =

Japanese footballer and manager

Toru Yoshida 吉田 暢
Personal information
- Full name: Toru Yoshida
- Date of birth: May 17, 1965 (age 61)
- Place of birth: Shiwa, Iwate, Japan
- Height: 1.77 m (5 ft 9 1/2 in)
- Position: Midfielder

Youth career
- 1981–198: Morioka Commercial High School

Senior career*
Years	Team	Apps	(Gls)
1984–1994	JEF United Ichihara	126	(2)
1995–1997	Brummell Sendai	46	(1)
Total		172	(3)

Managerial career
- 2001–2003: Sony Sendai
- 2006–2011: Grulla Morioka
Medal record
JEF United Ichihara
Winner	Japan Soccer League	1985/86
Winner	JSL Cup	1986
Runner-up	JSL Cup	1990
Runner-up	Emperor's Cup	1984
- * Club domestic league appearances and goals

Toru Yoshida (吉田 暢, Yoshida Tōru; born May 17, 1965) is a former Japanese football player and manager.

== Playing career ==
Yoshida was born in Shiwa, Iwate on May 17, 1965. After graduating from high school, he joined Furukawa Electric (later JEF United Ichihara) in 1984. He played many matches as side back from 1986 and the club won the champions 1986 JSL Cup and 1986 Asian Club Championship. This is first Asian champions as Japanese club. In 1995, he moved to Japan Football League club Brummell Sendai. He retired end of 1997 season.

== Coaching career ==
After retirement, Yoshida became a coach for Sony Sendai in 1998. In September 2001, he became a manager as Kazuaki Nagasawa successor. He managed the club until 2003. In 2006, he signed with Regional Leagues club Grulla Morioka based in his local Iwate Prefecture. He managed the club until 2011.

== Club statistics ==
Club performance			League		Cup		League Cup		Total	
Season	Club	League	Apps	Goals	Apps	Goals	Apps	Goals	Apps	Goals
Japan			League		Emperor's Cup		J.League Cup		Total	
1984	Furukawa Electric	JSL Division 1	6	0					6	0
1985/86	Furukawa Electric	JSL Division 1	0	0					0	0
1986/87	Furukawa Electric	JSL Division 1	18	1					18	1
1987/88	Furukawa Electric	JSL Division 1	17	0					17	0
1988/89	Furukawa Electric	JSL Division 1	5	1					5	1
1989/90	Furukawa Electric	JSL Division 1	22	0			2	0	24	0
1990/91	Furukawa Electric	JSL Division 1	12	0			5	0	17	0
1991/92	Furukawa Electric	JSL Division 1	3	0			1	0	4	0
1992	JEF United Ichihara	J1 League	-				7	0	7	0
1993	JEF United Ichihara	J1 League	26	0	2	0	5	0	33	0
1994	JEF United Ichihara	J1 League	17	0	0	0	2	0	19	0
1995	Brummell Sendai	Football League	12	0	2	0	-		14	0
1996	Brummell Sendai	Football League	25	1	2	1	-		27	2
1997	Brummell Sendai	Football League	9	0	0	0	6	0	15	0
Total			172	3	6	1	28	0	206	4
