= Masanao Sasaki =

Japanese footballer

Masanao Sasaki 佐々木 雅尚
Personal information
- Full name: Masanao Sasaki
- Date of birth: June 19, 1962 (age 64)
- Place of birth: Chiba, Japan
- Height: 1.73 m (5 ft 8 in)
- Position: Midfielder

Youth career
- 1978–1980: Ichihara Midori High School
- 1981–1984: Kokushikan University

Senior career*
Years	Team	Apps	(Gls)
1985–1991	Honda	121	(10)
1991–1992	All Nippon Airways	17	(1)
1992–1993	JEF United Ichihara	18	(1)
1994	Kashiwa Reysol	4	(0)
Total		160	(12)

International career
1988–1991	Japan	20	(0)
- * Club domestic league appearances and goals

Masanao Sasaki (佐々木 雅尚, Sasaki Masanao), born June 19, 1962, is a former Japanese football player. He played for the Japan national team.

== Club career ==
Sasaki was born in Chiba Prefecture on June 19, 1962. After graduating from Kokushikan University, he joined Honda in 1985. He moved to All Nippon Airways in 1991. He also played at his local club JEF United Ichihara (1992–93) and Kashiwa Reysol (1994). He retired in 1994.

== National team career ==
On June 2, 1988, Sasaki debuted for the Japan national team against China. In 1989 and 1990, he played in all Japan’s international matches included the 1990 World Cup qualification and the 1990 Asian Games. He played 20 games for Japan between 1988 and 1991.

== Club statistics ==
Club performance			League		Cup		League Cup		Total	
Season	Club	League	Apps	Goals	Apps	Goals	Apps	Goals	Apps	Goals
Japan			League		Emperor's Cup		J.League Cup		Total	
1985/86	Honda	JSL Division 1	18	2	2	0	2	0	22	2
1986/87	Honda	JSL Division 1	22	2	3	1	4	1	29	4
1987/88	Honda	JSL Division 1	20	3	3	0	3	2	26	5
1988/89	Honda	JSL Division 1	20	3	3	0	1	0	24	3
1989/90	Honda	JSL Division 1	22	0	2	0	2	1	26	1
1990/91	Honda	JSL Division 1	19	0			4	0	23	0
1991/92	All Nippon Airways	JSL Division 1	17	1			1	0	18	1
1992	JEF United Ichihara	J1 League	-		2	0	6	1	8	1
1993	JEF United Ichihara	J1 League	18	1	0	0	0	0	18	1
1994	Kashiwa Reysol	Football League	4	0	0	0	-		4	0
Total			160	12	15	1	23	5	198	18

== National team statistics ==
Japan national team
Year	Apps	Goals
1988	2	0
1989	11	0
1990	6	0
1991	1	0
Total	20	0
