= Yuji Sakakura =

Japanese footballer and manager

Yuji Sakakura 阪倉 裕二
Personal information
- Full name: Yuji Sakakura
- Date of birth: June 7, 1967 (age 59)
- Place of birth: Yokkaichi, Mie, Japan
- Height: 1.78 m (5 ft 10 in)
- Position: Defender

Youth career
- 1983–1985: Yokkaichi Chuo Kogyo High School

College career
Years	Team	Apps	(Gls)
1986–1989	Juntendo University		

Senior career*
Years	Team	Apps	(Gls)
1990–1994	JEF United Ichihara	65	(1)
1995	Nagoya Grampus Eight	18	(0)
1996–1997	Brummell Sendai	52	(0)
1998	Mind House Yokkaichi		
Total		135	(1)

International career
1990–1991	Japan	6	(0)

Managerial career
- 2001: Yokohama FC
- 2014–2015: Tochigi SC
- 2018: AC Nagano Parceiro
Medal record
JEF United Ichihara
Runner-up	JSL Cup	1990
Nagoya Grampus Eight
Winner	Emperor's Cup	1995
Representing Japan
AFC Asian Cup
Gold medal – first place	1992 Japan
- * Club domestic league appearances and goals

Yuji Sakakura (阪倉 裕二, Sakakura Yūji; born June 7, 1967) is a former Japanese football player and manager. He played for Japan national team.

== Club career ==
Sakakura was educated at and played for Yokkaichi Chuo Kogyo High School and Juntendo University. After completing university, he joined Japan Soccer League side Furuawa Electric (later JEF United Ichihara). He moved to Nagoya Grampus Eight in 1995, then Japan Football League side Brummell Sendai in 1996. He finished his playing career in 1998 at his home town club Mind House TC, a Regional Leagues side, after playing for them for one season.

== National team career ==
Sakakura was capped 6 times without scoring for the Japan national team between 1990 and 1991. His first full international cap came on July 27, 1990 in a Dynasty Cup match against South Korea in Beijing. He was a member of the Japan team that won the 1992 Asian Cup but did not play in the tournament.

== Coaching career ==
Sakakura was a coach at Yokohama FC between 1999 and 2004. He briefly served as caretaker manager at the club after Yoshikazu Nagai was sacked in 2001. He coached Kyoto Sanga FC's U-18 team from 2005 to 2007. He moved to Tochigi SC and became a coach. In 2014, he became a manager and managed until July 2015. He signed with Shimizu S-Pulse in 2016 and coached until 2017. He moved to AC Nagano Parceiro in 2018 and became a coach. In June, he became a manager as Tetsuya Asano successor. He managed until end of 2018 season.

== Club statistics ==
Club performance			League		Cup		League Cup		Total	
Season	Club	League	Apps	Goals	Apps	Goals	Apps	Goals	Apps	Goals
Japan			League		Emperor's Cup		J.League Cup		Total	
1990/91	Furukawa Electric	JSL Division 1	20	0			5	0	25	0
1991/92	Furukawa Electric	JSL Division 1	12	1			1	0	13	1
1992	JEF United Ichihara	J1 League	-				9	0	9	0
1993	JEF United Ichihara	J1 League	25	0	0	0	0	0	25	0
1994	JEF United Ichihara	J1 League	8	0	0	0	2	0	10	0
1995	Nagoya Grampus Eight	J1 League	18	0	0	0	-		18	0
1996	Brummell Sendai	Football League	26	0	3	0	-		29	0
1997	Brummell Sendai	Football League	26	0	2	0	5	0	33	0
Total			135	1	5	0	22	0	162	1

== National team statistics ==
Japan national team
Year	Apps	Goals
1990	5	0
1991	1	0
Total	6	0

== Managerial statistics ==
Team	From	To	Record				
Team	From	To	G	W	D	L	Win %
Yokohama FC	2001	2001	1	0	0	1	0.00
Tochigi SC	2014	2015	66	20	18	28	30.30
AC Nagano Parceiro	2018	2018	20	8	5	7	40.00
Total			87	28	23	36	32.18

== Honors and awards ==
=== Team Honors ===
- 1992 Asian Cup (Champions)
