= Keisuke Makino =

Japanese footballer (born 1969)

Keisuke Makino 牧野 景輔
Personal information
- Full name: Keisuke Makino
- Date of birth: April 11, 1969 (age 57)
- Place of birth: Hyogo, Japan
- Height: 1.75 m (5 ft 9 in)
- Position: Forward

Youth career
- 1985–1987: Takigawa Daini High School

Senior career*
Years	Team	Apps	(Gls)
1988–1993	JEF United Ichihara	37	(11)
1994–1995	Cerezo Osaka		
Medal record
Cerezo Osaka
Runner-up	Emperor's Cup	1994
- * Club domestic league appearances and goals

Keisuke Makino (牧野 景輔, Makino Keisuke; born April 11, 1969) is a former Japanese football player.

== Playing career ==
Makino was born in Hyogo Prefecture on April 11, 1969. After graduating from high school, he joined Japan Soccer League club Furukawa Electric (later JEF United Ichihara) in 1988. He played 27 matches and 9 goals in the league. In 1992, Japan Soccer League was folded and founded new league J1 League. In 1994, he moved to Japan Football League club Cerezo Osaka. The club was promoted to J1 in 1995. However he could not play at all in the match and retired end of 1995 season.

== Club statistics ==
Club performance			League		Cup		League Cup		Total	
Season	Club	League	Apps	Goals	Apps	Goals	Apps	Goals	Apps	Goals
Japan			League		Emperor's Cup		J.League Cup		Total	
1988/89	Furukawa Electric	JSL Division 1								
1989/90	Furukawa Electric	JSL Division 1								
1990/91	Furukawa Electric	JSL Division 1								
1991/92	Furukawa Electric	JSL Division 1								
1992	JEF United Ichihara	J1 League	-				5	1	5	1
1993	JEF United Ichihara	J1 League	10	2	0	0	1	0	11	2
1994	Cerezo Osaka	Football League								
1995	Cerezo Osaka	J1 League	0	0			-		0	0
Total			10	2	0	0	6	1	16	3
