= František Mysliveček =

Czech footballer (born 1965)

Personal information
- Full name: František Mysliveček
- Date of birth: 19 June 1965 (age 61)
- Place of birth: Czechoslovakia
- Height: 1.74 m (5 ft 8 1/2 in)
- Position: Midfielder

Senior career*
Years	Team	Apps	(Gls)
1992–1994	JEF United Ichihara	28	(1)
1995	Ventforet Kofu		
1996	Brummell Sendai	17	(0)
1996–1997	FK Teplice	9	(0)
- * Club domestic league appearances and goals

František Mysliveček (born 19 June 1965) is a former Czech football player.

He played in the Gambrinus liga for FK Teplice. After finishing his active career as a footballer, he started to work as a football official. In 2005, while he was an official at FC Slovan Liberec, he was fined and banned for two years by the Football Association for match fixing. In January 2010, he became the sport director of FC Viktoria Plzeň.

== Club statistics ==
Club performance			League		Cup		League Cup		Total	
Season	Club	League	Apps	Goals	Apps	Goals	Apps	Goals	Apps	Goals
Japan			League		Emperor's Cup		J.League Cup		Total	
1992	JEF United Ichihara	J1 League	-				9	1	9	1
1993	JEF United Ichihara	J1 League	14	1	0	0	0	0	14	1
1994	JEF United Ichihara	J1 League	14	0	0	0	0	0	14	0
1995	Ventforet Kofu	Football League								
1996	Brummell Sendai	Football League	17	0	0	0	-		17	0
Total			45	1	9	1	0	0	54	2
