= Naoki Hommachi =

Japanese footballer (born 1968)

Naoki Hommachi 本街 直樹
Personal information
- Full name: Naoki Hommachi
- Date of birth: July 31, 1968 (age 58)
- Place of birth: Hyogo, Japan
- Height: 1.77 m (5 ft 9 1/2 in)
- Position: Defender

Youth career
- 1984–1986: Takigawa Daini High School
- 1987–1990: Kokushikan University

Senior career*
Years	Team	Apps	(Gls)
1991–1993	JEF United Ichihara	0	(0)
1994–1999	Montedio Yamagata	167	(3)
Total		167	(3)
- * Club domestic league appearances and goals

Naoki Hommachi (本街 直樹, Hommachi Naoki; born July 31, 1968) is a former Japanese football player.

== Playing career ==
Hommachi was born in Hyogo Prefecture on July 31, 1968. After graduating from Kokushikan University, he joined Furukawa Electric (later JEF United Ichihara) in 1991. However he did not play at all in any match. In 1994, he moved to the newly promoted Japan Football League club NEC Yamagata (later Montedio Yamagata). He played as a regular player at center back. The club was promoted to the new J2 League in 1999. He retired at the end of the 1999 season.

== Club statistics ==
Club performance			League		Cup		League Cup		Total	
Season	Club	League	Apps	Goals	Apps	Goals	Apps	Goals	Apps	Goals
Japan			League		Emperor's Cup		J.League Cup		Total	
1990/91	Furukawa Electric	JSL Division 1	0	0	0	0	0	0	0	0
1991/92	Furukawa Electric	JSL Division 1	0	0			0	0	0	0
1992	JEF United Ichihara	J1 League	-				0	0	0	0
1993	JEF United Ichihara	J1 League	0	0	0	0	0	0	0	0
1994	NEC Yamagata	Football League	23	1	1	0	-		24	1
1995	NEC Yamagata	Football League	26	2	-		-		26	2
1996	Montedio Yamagata	Football League	28	0	3	0	-		31	0
1997	Montedio Yamagata	Football League	29	0	3	0	-		32	0
1998	Montedio Yamagata	Football League	29	0	4	0	-		33	0
1999	Montedio Yamagata	J2 League	32	0	5	0	2	0	39	0
Total			167	3	16	0	2	0	185	3
