= Pavel Řehák =

Czech footballer

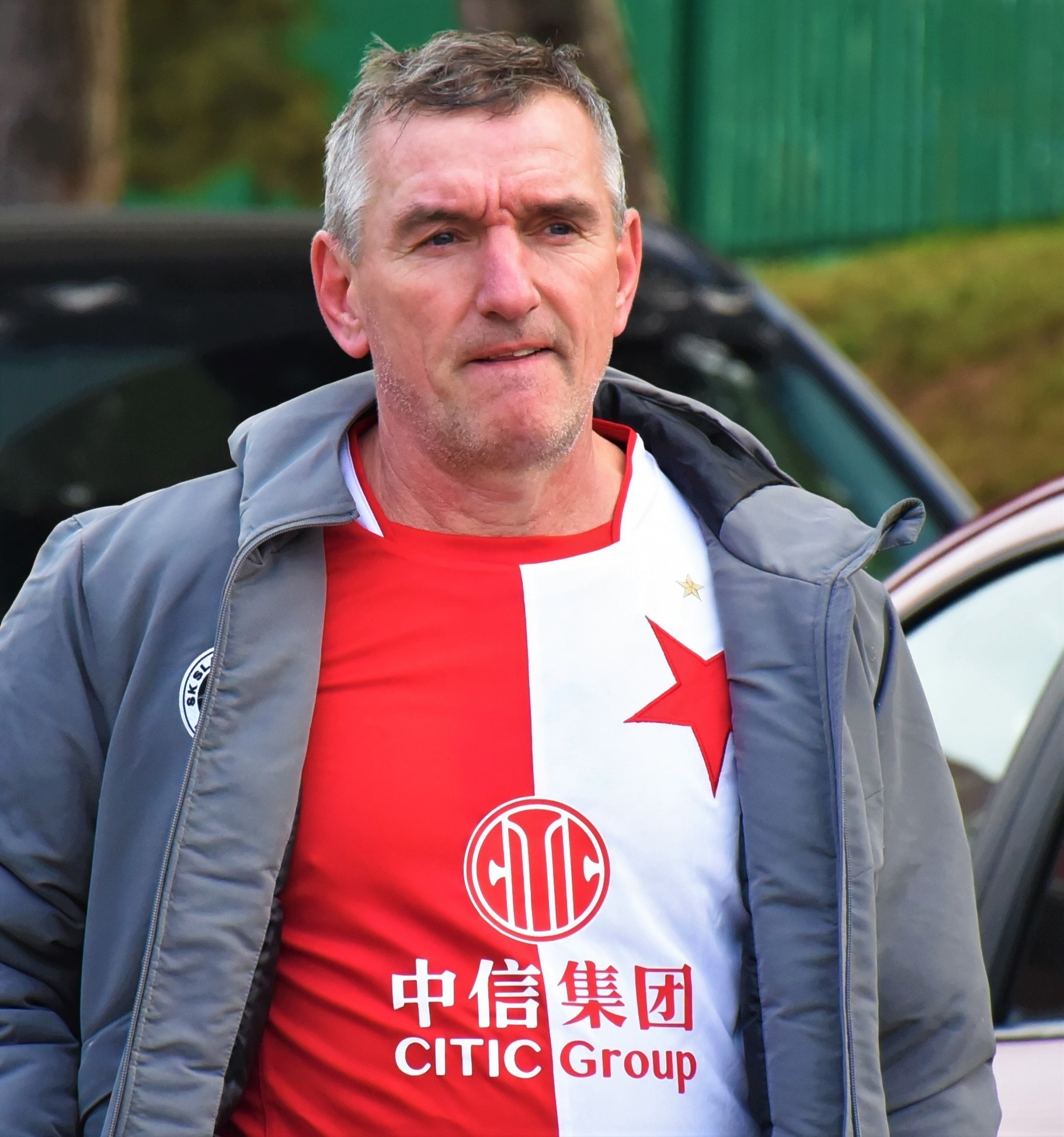
- Řehák in 2019.

Personal information
- Full name: Pavel Řehák
- Date of birth: October 7, 1963 (age 63)
- Place of birth: Czechoslovakia
- Height: 1.78 m (5 ft 10 in)
- Position: Striker

Senior career*
Years	Team	Apps	(Gls)
1984–1991	Slavia Praha	151	(37)
1991–1994	JEF United Ichihara	69	(25)
1995–1996	Consadole Sapporo	39	(16)
1997–1998	Slavia Praha	24	(3)
1998	Petra Drnovice	11	(0)
1999	Yokohama FC	20	(8)

Managerial career
- 2005: Vissel Kobe
- * Club domestic league appearances and goals

Řehák in 2026

Pavel Řehák (born 7 October 1963) is a former Czech football player.

He played in the top flight for Slavia Prague and Drnovice in his native country, as well as in Japan.

Following his playing career, Řehák became a manager. He was assistant manager for Vissel Kobe before taking on the manager role in June 2005.

== Club statistics ==
Club performance			League		Cup		League Cup		Total	
Season	Club	League	Apps	Goals	Apps	Goals	Apps	Goals	Apps	Goals
Japan			League		Emperor's Cup		J.League Cup		Total	
1991/92	Furukawa Electric	JSL Division 1	22	8			0	0	22	8
1992	JEF United Ichihara	J1 League	-				9	3	9	3
1993	JEF United Ichihara	J1 League	31	16	3	3	5	3	39	22
1994	JEF United Ichihara	J1 League	16	1	0	0	1	0	17	1
1995	Toshiba	Football League	23	11	1	0	-		24	11
1996	Consadole Sapporo	Football League	16	5	3	1	-		19	6
1999	Yokohama FC	Football League	20	8	3	4	-		23	12
Total			128	49	10	8	15	6	153	64

== Managerial statistics ==
Team	From	To	Record				
Team	From	To	G	W	D	L	Win %
Vissel Kobe	2005	2005	24	2	6	16	8.33
Total			24	2	6	16	8.33
