= Masanaga Kageyama =

Japanese footballer and manager

Masanaga Kageyama 影山 雅永
Personal information
- Full name: Masanaga Kageyama
- Date of birth: May 23, 1967 (age 59)
- Place of birth: Iwaki, Fukushima, Japan
- Height: 1.81 m (5 ft 11 in)
- Position: Defender

Youth career
- 1983–1985: Iwaki High School

College career
Years	Team	Apps	(Gls)
1986–1989	University of Tsukuba		

Senior career*
Years	Team	Apps	(Gls)
1990–1994	JEF United Ichihara	84	(2)
1995	Urawa Reds	0	(0)
1996	Brummell Sendai	19	(2)
Total		103	(4)

Managerial career
- 2006–2008: Macau
- 2008: Singapore U16
- 2010–2014: Fagiano Okayama
- 2017−2021: Japan U20
Medal record
JEF United Ichihara
Runner-up	JSL Cup	1990
- * Club domestic league appearances and goals

Masanaga Kageyama (影山 雅永, Kageyama Masanaga; born May 23, 1967) is a Japanese former footballer and manager.

== Playing career ==
Kageyama was born in Iwaki on May 23, 1967. After graduating from University of Tsukuba, he joined Furukawa Electric (later JEF United Ichihara) in 1990. He became a regular player as center back from 1991. He moved to Urawa Reds in 1995. However he could not play in the match and moved to Japan Football League club Brummell Sendai in 1996. He retired at the end of the 1996 season.

== Coaching career ==
After retirement, Kageyama served as technical staff for Japan national team. In 2001, he signed with Sanfrecce Hiroshima and became a coach. In 2006, he moved to Macau and became a manager for Macau national team. In 2008, he moved to Singapore and became a manager for Singapore U-16 national team. Although he managed at 2008 AFC U-16 Championship, U-16 Singapore lost all 3 matches. In 2009, he returned to Japan and signed with newly was promoted to J2 League club, Fagiano Okayama. He became a coach in 2009, and a manager as Satoshi Tezuka's successor in 2010. He managed the club until 2014. In 2017, Kageyama became a manager for Japan U-20 national team. U-20 Japan won the 3rd place at 2018 AFC U-19 Championship and qualified for 2019 U-20 World Cup.

== Club statistics ==
Club performance			League		Cup		League Cup		Total	
Season	Club	League	Apps	Goals	Apps	Goals	Apps	Goals	Apps	Goals
Japan			League		Emperor's Cup		J.League Cup		Total	
1990/91	Furukawa Electric	JSL Division 1	9	0	0	0	0	0	9	0
1991/92	Furukawa Electric	JSL Division 1	21	2	3	0	0	0	24	2
1992	JEF United Ichihara	J1 League	-		3	0	0	0	3	0
1993	JEF United Ichihara	J1 League	29	1	3	0	6	0	38	1
1994	JEF United Ichihara	J1 League	25	1	0	0	2	0	27	1
1995	Urawa Reds	J1 League	0	0	0	0	-		0	0
1996	Brummell Sendai	Football League	19	2	3	1	-		22	3
Total			103	6	12	1	8	0	123	7

== Managerial statistics ==
Team	From	To	Record				
Team	From	To	G	W	D	L	Win %
Fagiano Okayama	2010	2014	200	66	64	70	33.00
Total			200	66	64	70	33.00

== Criminal conviction ==
On 6 October 2025, the Bobigny Criminal Court in France sentenced Kageyama to a suspended 18-month prison term, a €5000 fine, a ban on entering France for 10 years, and a ban from working with minors for 10 years, after he was arrested at Charles de Gaulle Airport for viewing child pornography aboard an Air France flight.
