= Kazuyuki Kyoya =

Japanese footballer

Kazuyuki Kyoya 京谷 和幸
Personal information
- Full name: Kazuyuki Kyoya
- Date of birth: August 13, 1971 (age 55)
- Place of birth: Muroran, Hokkaido, Japan
- Height: 1.72 m (5 ft 7 1/2 in)
- Position: Midfielder

Youth career
- 1987–1989: Muroran Otani High School

Senior career*
Years	Team	Apps	(Gls)
1990–1993	JEF United Ichihara	11	(0)
Total		11	(0)
Medal record
JEF United Ichihara
Runner-up	JSL Cup	1990
- * Club domestic league appearances and goals

Kazuyuki Kyoya (京谷 和幸, Kyōya Kazuyuki; born August 13, 1971) is a former Japanese football player and wheelchair basketball player. He has competed in the 4 Summer Paralympics.

== Football career ==
Kyoya was born in Muroran on August 13, 1971. After graduating from high school, Kyoya joined the Japan Soccer League team Furukawa Electric (later JEF United Ichihara) in 1990. He played many matches in 1991. In 1992, the Japan Soccer League was dissolved and the new J1 League was founded. In October 1993, he debuted in the J.League games against Gamba Osaka at the J.League Cup.

However, on November 28, 1993, Kyoya injured his spinal cord in a traffic accident. He retired from his football career, as he could not walk.

== Wheelchair basketball career ==
In 1994, Kyoya started wheelchair basketball career. He has competed in the four Summer Paralympic Games: in 2000, 2004, 2008, and 2012. After the 2012 Paralympics, he retired from his career in wheelchair basketball.

== Club statistics ==
Club performance			League		Cup		League Cup		Total	
Season	Club	League	Apps	Goals	Apps	Goals	Apps	Goals	Apps	Goals
Japan			League		Emperor's Cup		J.League Cup		Total	
1990/91	Furukawa Electric	JSL Division 1	1	0			1	0	2	0
1991/92	Furukawa Electric	JSL Division 1	10	0			0	0	10	0
1992	JEF United Ichihara	J1 League	-				0	0	0	0
1993	JEF United Ichihara	J1 League	0	0	0	0	1	0	1	0
Career total			11	0	0	0	2	0	13	0

== Television movie ==
A television movie inspired by Kyoya's story titled Kimi ni Sasageru Emblem (君に捧げるエンブレム; lit. An Emblem Dedicated to You) was broadcast on Fuji TV on January 3, 2017. Arashi's member Sho Sakurai portrayed Kyoya.
