= Yusuke Minoguchi =

Japanese footballer (born 1965)

Yusuke Minoguchi 簔口 祐介
Personal information
- Full name: Yusuke Minoguchi
- Date of birth: 23 August 1965 (age 61)
- Place of birth: Hokkaido, Japan
- Height: 1.81 m (5 ft 11 1/2 in)
- Position: Forward

Youth career
- 1981–1983: Chiba Meitoku High School
- 1984–1987: Kokushikan University

Senior career*
Years	Team	Apps	(Gls)
1988–1992	JEF United Ichihara	67	(14)
1993–1994	PJM Futures		
1995	Fukuoka Blux		
1996	Oita Trinity		
Medal record
Furukawa Electric
Runner-up	JSL Cup	1990
- * Club domestic league appearances and goals

Yusuke Minoguchi (簔口 祐介, Minoguchi Yūsuke; born 23 August 1965) is a former Japanese football player.

== Club career ==
Minoguchi was born in Hokkaido on 23 August 1965. After graduating from Kokushikan University, he joined Furukawa Electric (later JEF United Ichihara) in 1988. He played 67 games and scored 14 goals in Japan Soccer League. From 1993, he played for Japan Football League club PJM Futures (1993–1994), Fukuoka Blux (1995) and Oita Trinity (1996).

== National team career ==
In 1988, Minoguchi was selected Japan national "B team" for 1988 Asian Cup. At this competition, he played 2 games. However, Japan Football Association don't count as Japan national team match because this Japan team was "B team" not "top team"

== Club statistics ==
Club performance			League		Cup		League Cup		Total	
Season	Club	League	Apps	Goals	Apps	Goals	Apps	Goals	Apps	Goals
Japan			League		Emperor's Cup		J.League Cup		Total	
1988/89	Furukawa Electric	JSL Division 1	14	2					14	2
1989/90	Furukawa Electric	JSL Division 1	16	6			1	0	17	6
1990/91	Furukawa Electric	JSL Division 1	18	2			5	2	23	4
1991/92	Furukawa Electric	JSL Division 1	19	4			1	0	20	4
1992	JEF United Ichihara	J1 League	-				0	0	0	0
Total			67	14	0	0	7	2	74	16
