= Martin Hřídel =

Czech footballer and manager (born 1968)

Personal information
- Date of birth: 22 May 1968 (age 58)
- Place of birth: Czechoslovakia
- Position: Forward

Senior career*
Years	Team	Apps	(Gls)
1992	JEF United Ichihara	0	(0)
1993–1996	FC Slovan Liberec	75	(11)
1996–1998	FC Viktoria Plzeň	40	(3)
Total		115	(14)

Managerial career
- 2008–2010: SK Kladno
- 2010: FC Zenit Čáslav
- 2010: 1. FK Příbram
- * Club domestic league appearances and goals

Martin Hřídel (born 22 May 1968) is a Czech former football player and manager, whose playing position was forward. As a player, he made more than 100 appearances in the top flight of Czech football, the Czech First League. As a manager, he managed SK Kladno and 1. FK Příbram in the Czech First League.

== Playing career ==
Hřídel played in the Czech First League for five seasons in the 1990s, playing for FC Slovan Liberec and FC Viktoria Plzeň.

== Managerial career ==
After his playing career, Hřídel worked as a coach with various teams including the national youth football teams. He went on to work as assistant coach to Luboš Kozel at FK Baumit Jablonec in 2007.

Hřídel joined SK Kladno in the summer of 2008, coming in as the new manager as a replacement for outgoing boss Jaroslav Šilhavý. In his first season, Kladno finished in 14th place in the 2008–09 Czech First League, one position above the relegation zone.

Hřídel led Kladno during the 2009–10 Czech First League until being replaced in April 2010. After his release he headed to Czech 2. Liga club FC Zenit Čáslav, where he saved the team from relegation.

Hřídel joined Czech First League side 1. FK Příbram in the summer of 2010. However, after a start which saw the team win just twice in ten games, Hřídel was relieved of his duties.
