= Chiba Sports Stadium =

Stadium in Inage Ward, Chiba Prefecture, Japan

Coordinates: 35°38′47″N 140°07′10″E

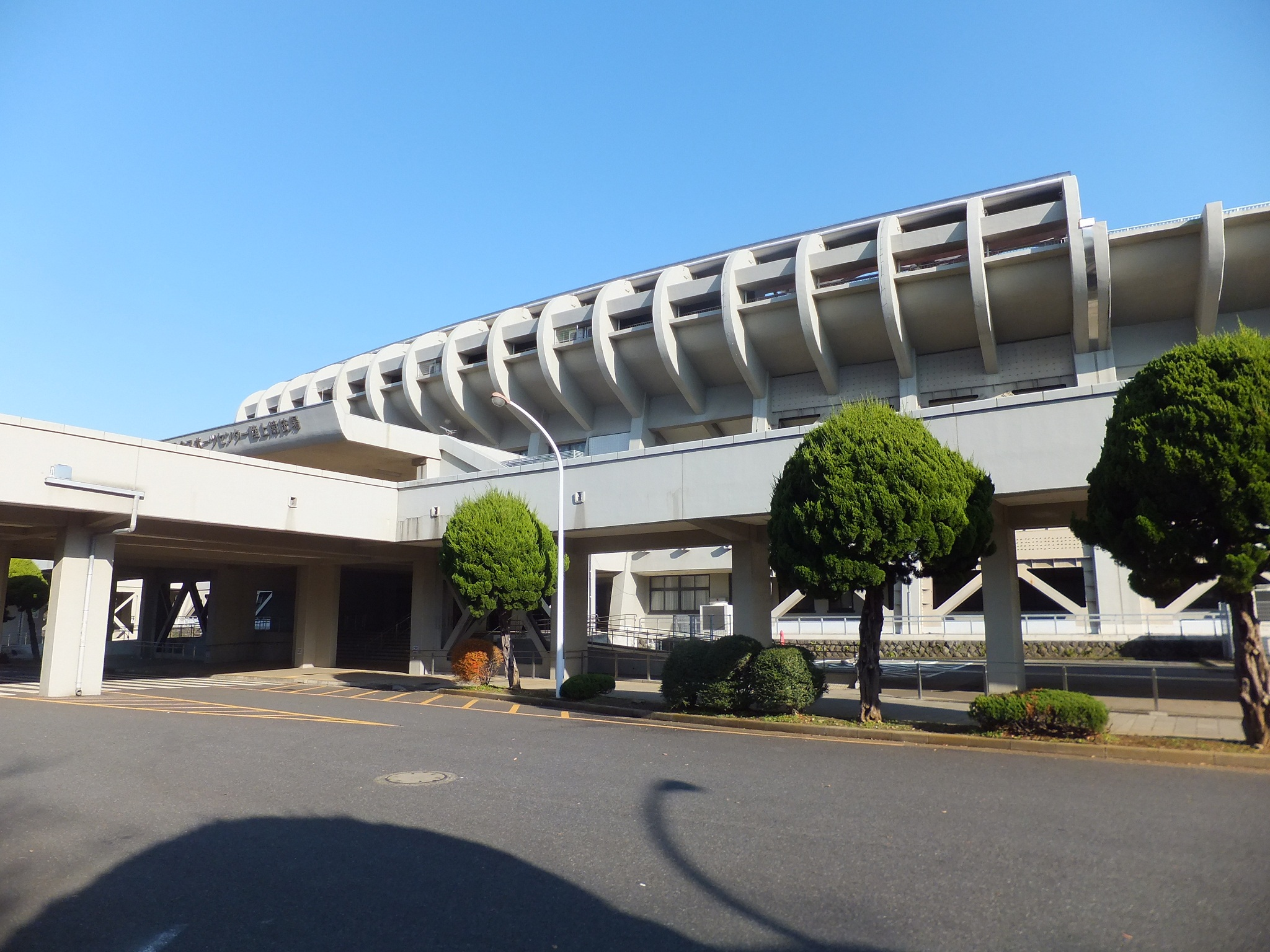
- Interactive map of Chiba Sports Stadium
- Former names: Chiba Park Stadium (1966-2003)
- Location: Chiba, Japan
- Capacity: 30,000
- Surface: Grass

Construction
- Opened: 1966

Chiba Sports Stadium (千葉県総合スポーツセンター陸上競技場) is a multi-purpose stadium in Chiba, Chiba, Japan. It is currently used mostly for football matches. The stadium holds 30,000 people.
