= 1995 Sanfrecce Hiroshima season =

Sanfrecce Hiroshima
1995 season
- Manager: Wim Jansen
- Stadium: Hiroshima Stadium
- J.League: 10th
- Emperor's Cup: Runners-up
- Top goalscorer: League: Noh Jung-Yoon (13); All: Noh Jung-Yoon (14)
- Highest home attendance: 8,667 (vs Gamba Osaka, 21 June 1995); 20,265 (vs Verdy Kawasaki, 18 November 1995, Hiroshima Big Arch)
- Lowest home attendance: 7,012 (vs Nagoya Grampus Eight, 12 April 1995)
- Average home league attendance: 11,689
Home colours	Away colours

1995 Sanfrecce Hiroshima season

== Review and events ==
=== League results summary ===
Overall								Home						Away					
Pld	W	D	L	GF	GA	GD	Pts	W	D	L	GF	GA	GD	W	D	L	GF	GA	GD
52	22	0	30	69	76	−7	67	15	0	11	39	21	+18	7	0	19	30	55	−25

Source: J.LEAGUE OFFICIAL RECORD & DATA 1996. ISBN 4-09-102323-1.

=== League results by round ===
J.League Suntory series (first stage)
Round	1	2	3	4	5	6	7	8	9	10	11	12	13	14	15	16	17	18	19	20	21	22	23	24	25	26
Ground	H	H	A	H	A	A	H	H	A	H	A	H	A	A	H	A	H	H	A	A	H	A	H	A	H	A
Result	L	W	L	W	W	W	L	W	L	W	W	L	W	L	W	L	L	W	L	L	W	L	W	L	W	L
Position	11	4	8	5	4	2	5	5	6	5	3	5	4	5	4	6	6	5	6	9	9	9	9	10	9	10

Source: J.LEAGUE OFFICIAL RECORD & DATA 1996. ISBN 4-09-102323-1.
A = Away; H = Home; W = Win; D = Draw; L = Loss

J.League NICOS series (second stage)
Round	1	2	3	4	5	6	7	8	9	10	11	12	13	14	15	16	17	18	19	20	21	22	23	24	25	26
Ground	A	H	A	A	H	A	H	H	A	A	H	A	H	A	H	H	A	H	A	A	H	H	A	H	A	H
Result	W	W	L	L	L	L	L	L	W	L	L	L	L	W	W	W	L	W	L	L	W	L	L	W	L	L
Position	7	3	7	9	10	12	11	11	10	11	12	12	13	13	12	11	11	11	11	12	11	12	12	12	12	12

Source: J.LEAGUE OFFICIAL RECORD & DATA 1996. ISBN 4-09-102323-1.
A = Away; H = Home; W = Win; D = Draw; L = Loss

== Competitions ==
Competitions	Position
J.League	10th / 14 clubs
Emperor's Cup	Runners-up

== Domestic results ==
=== J.League ===
18 March 1995 1st-1	Sanfrecce Hiroshima	0–1 (V-goal) (a.e.t.)	Cerezo Osaka	Hiroshima Big Arch
15:04 JST (UTC+09)		J. League	Yamahashi 113'	Attendance: 14,175; Referee: Kenji Tanaka; Assistant referees: Hiroshi Tanabe, Naoki Esumi; Fourth official: Yutaka Miyake

22 March 1995 1st-2	Sanfrecce Hiroshima	5–0	Shimizu S-Pulse	Hiroshima Stadium
19:01 JST (UTC+09)	Fue 7', 30'; Mori 10'; Huistra 28' (pen.); Hašek 87'	J. League		Attendance: 7,421; Referee: Armando Perez; Assistant referees: Tōru Yamashiro, Yasuhiro Matsuzaki; Fourth official: Kazuhiko Matsumura; Man of the Match: Masato Fue

25 March 1995 1st-3	Kashima Antlers	2–0	Sanfrecce Hiroshima	Kashima Soccer Stadium
15:00 JST (UTC+09)	Jorginho 33'; Kurosaki 89'	J. League		Attendance: 15,144; Referee: Lutz Fröhlich; Assistant referees: Noboru Ishiyama, Kō Ōishi; Fourth official: Kazuhiko Kumagai

29 March 1995 1st-4	Sanfrecce Hiroshima	2–0	Verdy Kawasaki	Hiroshima Big Arch
19:04 JST (UTC+09)	Hašek 17', 82'	J. League		Attendance: 17,333; Referee: Juan Carlos Crespi; Assistant referees: Hitoshi Yamada, Kōji Minami; Fourth official: Mamoru Ueda; Man of the Match: Hašek

1 April 1995 1st-5	Yokohama Flügels	1–2 (V-goal) (a.e.t.)	Sanfrecce Hiroshima	Kumamoto Suizenji Stadium
14:00 JST (UTC+09)	Evair 21'	J. League	Moriyasu 36'; Hašek 102'	Attendance: 10,481; Referee: Shinichirō Obata; Assistant referees: Tōru Yamashiro, Hiroyuki Izumi; Fourth official: Mitsuo Kimura; Man of the Match: Hašek

5 April 1995 1st-6	Gamba Osaka	0–3	Sanfrecce Hiroshima	Expo '70 Commemorative Stadium
19:00 JST (UTC+09)		J. League	Noh 4', 29'; Katanosaka 71'	Attendance: 11,332; Referee: Yoshitsugu Katayama; Assistant referees: Yoshikazu Hiroshima, Akio Okutani; Fourth official: Sōichirō Kaneko; Man of the Match: Noh Jung-Yoon

8 April 1995 1st-7	Sanfrecce Hiroshima	1–2	JEF United Ichihara	Hiroshima Big Arch
15:02 JST (UTC+09)	Hašek 83'	J. League	Ejiri 1'; Rufer 7'	Attendance: 11,266; Referee: Kenji Tanaka; Assistant referees: Noboru Ishiyama, Naoki Esumi; Fourth official: Kōji Ueno

12 April 1995 1st-8	Sanfrecce Hiroshima	4–0	Nagoya Grampus Eight	Hiroshima Stadium
19:01 JST (UTC+09)	Hašek 43', 77' (pen.), 84'; Mori 61'	J. League		Attendance: 7,012; Referee: Hideo Kikuchi; Assistant referees: Hideaki Harada, Kōji Minami; Fourth official: Shinji Saga; Man of the Match: Hašek

15 April 1995 1st-9	Júbilo Iwata	1–0	Sanfrecce Hiroshima	Júbilo Iwata Stadium
19:01 JST (UTC+09)	Nakayama 20'	J. League		Attendance: 18,542; Referee: Tatsumi Ōno; Assistant referees: Naoyuki Mori, Mikio Fukuoka; Fourth official: Takuya Okada

22 April 1995 1st-10	Sanfrecce Hiroshima	1–1 (V-goal) (a.e.t.) (4–2 p)	Urawa Red Diamonds	Hiroshima Big Arch
15:03 JST (UTC+09)	Moriyasu 3'	J. League	Bein 44'	Attendance: 12,387; Referee: Hiroyuki Umemoto; Assistant referees: Hiroshi Tanabe, Naoki Esumi; Fourth official: Kōji Hanaguchi; Man of the Match: Kazuya Maekawa
	Penalties
	(penalty scored) Van Loen; (penalty scored) Mori; (penalty scored) Moriyasu; (penalty scored) Kuwabara		(penalty scored) Fukuda; (penalty missed) Taguchi; (penalty scored) Hirose; (penalty missed) Hori

26 April 1995 1st-11	Bellmare Hiratsuka	2–3	Sanfrecce Hiroshima	Hiratsuka Stadium
19:03 JST (UTC+09)	Edson 13'; Betinho 25'	J. League	Uemura 10'; Michiki 23'; Van Loen 76'	Attendance: 11,337; Referee: Juan Carlos Crespi; Assistant referees: Takashi Kunori, Ichirō Inukai; Fourth official: Junichi Takahashi; Man of the Match: Van Loen

29 April 1995 1st-12	Sanfrecce Hiroshima	0–1	Yokohama Marinos	Oita Athletic Stadium
17:01 JST (UTC+09)		J. League	Jinno 89'	Attendance: 10,237; Referee: Masayoshi Okada; Assistant referees: Hideaki Harada, Tōru Yamashiro; Fourth official: Tsunenori Nagamatsu

3 May 1995 1st-13	Kashiwa Reysol	1–2	Sanfrecce Hiroshima	Niigata Stadium
19:04 JST (UTC+09)	Ōba 39'	J. League	Ōki 66'; Huistra 83'	Attendance: 14,723; Referee: Fumikazu Shioyazono; Assistant referees: Yū Nakamura, Kimio Izaki; Fourth official: Masaaki Shimomura; Man of the Match: Noh Jung-Yoon

6 May 1995 1st-14	Shimizu S-Pulse	1–0	Sanfrecce Hiroshima	Nihondaira Sports Stadium
16:05 JST (UTC+09)	Miura 35'	J. League		Attendance: 18,511; Referee: Yōtarō Moritsu; Assistant referees: Naoyuki Mori, Kazuhisa Osada; Fourth official: Naoki Uchiyama

10 May 1995 1st-15	Sanfrecce Hiroshima	3–0	Kashima Antlers	Hiroshima Big Arch
19:04 JST (UTC+09)	Van Loen 22', 82'; Huistra 58' (pen.)	J. League		Attendance: 13,143; Referee: Yoshitsugu Katayama; Assistant referees: Kazuaki Hamaguchi, Naoki Esumi; Fourth official: Kazuyuki Tanimoto; Man of the Match: Van Loen

13 May 1995 1st-16	Verdy Kawasaki	3–1	Sanfrecce Hiroshima	Kawasaki Todoroki Stadium
19:04 JST (UTC+09)	Takeda 40'; Hasebe 71'; Alcindo 89'	J. League	Moriyasu 75'	Attendance: 13,119; Referee: Lutz Fröhlich; Assistant referees: Kenichi Koshiyama, Tōru Kamikawa; Fourth official: Haruo Imai

17 June 1995 1st-17	Sanfrecce Hiroshima	1–2	Yokohama Flügels	Hiroshima Big Arch
18:31 JST (UTC+09)	Ōki 89'	J. League	Harada 52'; Hattori 83'	Attendance: 15,284; Referee: Armando Perez; Assistant referees: Naoki Esumi, Kōji Minami; Fourth official: Shinya Sasamoto

21 June 1995 1st-18	Sanfrecce Hiroshima	1–0	Gamba Osaka	Hiroshima Stadium
19:00 JST (UTC+09)	Hašek 36'	J. League		Attendance: 8,667; Referee: Lutz Fröhlich; Assistant referees: Hiroshi Tanabe, Tōru Kamikawa; Fourth official: Satoru Yamada; Man of the Match: Ryūji Michiki

24 June 1995 1st-19	JEF United Ichihara	3–0	Sanfrecce Hiroshima	Ichihara Stadium
18:33 JST (UTC+09)	Niimura 37', 76'; Maslovar 46'	J. League		Attendance: 14,276; Referee: Naotsugu Fuse; Assistant referees: Takeshi Ōkura, Kōji Taniuchi; Fourth official: Eiji Kawai

28 June 1995 1st-20	Nagoya Grampus Eight	2–1 (V-goal) (a.e.t.)	Sanfrecce Hiroshima	Nagoya Mizuho Athletics Stadium
19:00 JST (UTC+09)	Yonekura 70'; Moriyama 118'	J. League	Michiki 1'	Attendance: 19,616; Referee: Masayoshi Okada; Assistant referees: Masahiro Katagiri, Tōru Yamashiro; Fourth official: Yukio Fujita

1 July 1995 1st-21	Sanfrecce Hiroshima	3–1	Júbilo Iwata	Hiroshima Big Arch
18:33 JST (UTC+09)	Van Loen 2', 21', 70'	J. League	Schillaci 67'	Attendance: 16,211; Referee: Lutz Fröhlich; Assistant referees: Peter Augar, Olaf Blumenstein; Fourth official: Masahiro Katsuyama; Man of the Match: Van Loen

8 July 1995 1st-22	Urawa Red Diamonds	3–2 (V-goal) (a.e.t.)	Sanfrecce Hiroshima	Omiya Football Stadium
18:33 JST (UTC+09)	Fukuda 23' 93'; Fukunaga 89'	J. League	Uemura 61'; Michiki 89'	Attendance: 9,168; Referee: Keiichi Sunakawa; Assistant referees: Toshiyuki Mayuzumi, Kō Ōishi; Fourth official: Toshimitsu Yasumoto

12 July 1995 1st-23	Sanfrecce Hiroshima	1–0	Bellmare Hiratsuka	Hiroshima Stadium
19:03 JST (UTC+09)	Van Loen 33'	J. League		Attendance: 8,174; Referee: Yoshimi Ogawa; Assistant referees: Olaf Blumenstein, Tōru Yamashiro; Fourth official: Syūji Kagawa; Man of the Match: Ryūji Michiki

15 July 1995 1st-24	Yokohama Marinos	3–0	Sanfrecce Hiroshima	Sapporo Atsubetsu Stadium
15:00 JST (UTC+09)	Bisconti 24' (pen.), 78'; Medina Bello 73'	J. League		Attendance: 14,905; Referee: Juan Carlos Crespi; Assistant referees: Kenichi Koshiyama, Tetsu Karakida; Fourth official: Yutaka Furukawa

19 July 1995 1st-25	Sanfrecce Hiroshima	1–0 (V-goal) (a.e.t.)	Kashiwa Reysol	Hiroshima Stadium
19:00 JST (UTC+09)	Noh 101'	J. League		Attendance: 8,308; Referee: Hiroyuki Umemoto; Assistant referees: Hiroshi Tanabe, Sōichirō Kaneko; Fourth official: Norio Kuriyama; Man of the Match: Noh Jung-Yoon

22 July 1995 1st-26	Cerezo Osaka	3–1	Sanfrecce Hiroshima	Osaka Nagai No.2 Stadium
19:00 JST (UTC+09)	Toninho 57'; Marquinhos 59', 68'	J. League	Moriyama 86'	Attendance: 10,394; Referee: Yoshitsugu Katayama; Assistant referees: Kazuo Kakihana, Hideaki Harada; Fourth official: Tsuyoshi Miyake

12 August 1995 2nd-1	Shimizu S-Pulse	0–1	Sanfrecce Hiroshima	Nihondaira Sports Stadium
19:01 JST (UTC+09)		J. League	Hašek 84'	Attendance: 20,117; Referee: Fumikazu Shioyazono; Assistant referees: Morihisa Yamaguchi, Kimio Izaki; Fourth official: Naoki Uchiyama; Man of the Match: Hašek

16 August 1995 2nd-2	Sanfrecce Hiroshima	1–0	Cerezo Osaka	Hiroshima Big Arch
19:01 JST (UTC+09)	Uemura 88'	J. League		Attendance: 15,523; Referee: Hideo Kikuchi; Assistant referees: Hiroshi Fukuda, Hiroyuki Izumi; Fourth official: Shinji Saga; Man of the Match: Yahiro Kazama

19 August 1995 2nd-3	Kashiwa Reysol	1–0 (V-goal) (a.e.t.)	Sanfrecce Hiroshima	Kashiwa Hitachi Stadium
18:59 JST (UTC+09)	Valdir 97'	J. League		Attendance: 12,429; Referee: Tetsuya Hamana; Assistant referees: Toshiyuki Mayuzumi, Kazuhisa Osada; Fourth official: Eita Horikawa

23 August 1995 2nd-4	Gamba Osaka	5–2	Sanfrecce Hiroshima	Expo '70 Commemorative Stadium
19:02 JST (UTC+09)	Yamaguchi 13'; Aleinikov 19'; Isogai 40' (pen.); Morioka 79'; Kitamura 84'	J. League	Van Loen 5'; Hašek 38'	Attendance: 9,440; Referee: Yōtarō Moritsu; Assistant referees: Yasushi Tsuchimoto, Mitsuyoshi Nakaguma; Fourth official: Kazuo Kakihana

26 August 1995 2nd-5	Sanfrecce Hiroshima	0–1 (V-goal) (a.e.t.)	Urawa Red Diamonds	Hiroshima Big Arch
18:30 JST (UTC+09)		J. League	Fukuda 92'	Attendance: 14,545; Referee: Masayoshi Okada; Assistant referees: Satoru Kawano, Kōji Minami; Fourth official: Katsuya Motoyasu

2 September 1995 2nd-6	Bellmare Hiratsuka	4–0	Sanfrecce Hiroshima	Hiratsuka Stadium
19:03 JST (UTC+09)	18' (o.g.); Noguchi 73', 77'; Takemura 85'	J. League		Attendance: 12,354; Referee: Tetsuya Hamana; Assistant referees: Hitoshi Yamada, Akio Okutani; Fourth official: Jōji Kashihara

6 September 1995 2nd-7	Sanfrecce Hiroshima	0–0 (V-goal) (a.e.t.) (1–4 p)	Yokohama Marinos	Hiroshima Stadium
19:03 JST (UTC+09)		J. League		Attendance: 8,171; Referee: Alfredo Trentalange; Assistant referees: Tōru Kamikawa, Hiroyuki Izumi; Fourth official: Kazuyuki Tanimoto
	Penalties
	(penalty scored) Kazama; (penalty missed) Hašek; (penalty missed) Yanagimoto		(penalty scored) Bisconti; (penalty scored) Tetsuya Itō; (penalty scored) Omura; (penalty scored) Ihara

9 September 1995 2nd-8	Sanfrecce Hiroshima	0–2	JEF United Ichihara	Hiroshima Big Arch
19:03 JST (UTC+09)		J. League	Maslovar 60'; Niimura 70'	Attendance: 11,227; Referee: Yoshimi Ogawa; Assistant referees: Sōichirō Kaneko, Tōru Yamashiro; Fourth official: Mamoru Ueda

13 September 1995 2nd-9	Júbilo Iwata	1–2	Sanfrecce Hiroshima	Júbilo Iwata Stadium
19:00 JST (UTC+09)	Dunga 89'	J. League	7' (o.g.); Noh 20'	Attendance: 15,669; Referee: Kenji Tanaka; Assistant referees: Masahiro Katagiri, Toshimitsu Yoshida; Fourth official: Tōru Nagata; Man of the Match: Kazuya Maekawa

16 September 1995 2nd-10	Nagoya Grampus Eight	1–0	Sanfrecce Hiroshima	Nagoya Mizuho Athletics Stadium
19:05 JST (UTC+09)	Passi 37'	J. League		Attendance: 19,735; Referee: Kenji Tanaka; Assistant referees: Morihisa Yamaguchi, Mitsuyoshi Nakaguma; Fourth official: Takao Wakahara

23 September 1995 2nd-11	Sanfrecce Hiroshima	1–2	Kashima Antlers	Hiroshima Big Arch
15:03 JST (UTC+09)	Michiki 47'	J. League	Leonardo 39', 50'	Attendance: 13,025; Referee: Hideo Kikuchi; Assistant referees: Hiroshi Tanabe, Hideaki Harada; Fourth official: Masahiro Katsuyama

27 September 1995 2nd-12	Verdy Kawasaki	3–0	Sanfrecce Hiroshima	Hakatanomori Football Stadium
19:03 JST (UTC+09)	Alcindo 63', 81'; Miura 89'	J. League		Attendance: 16,965; Referee: Armando Perez; Assistant referees: Yasuhiro Hemmi, Tōru Kamikawa; Fourth official: Masatoshi Shibata

30 September 1995 2nd-13	Sanfrecce Hiroshima	0–1	Yokohama Flügels	Ehime Matsuyama Athletic Stadium
18:34 JST (UTC+09)		J. League	Miura 69'	Attendance: 11,206; Referee: Alfredo Trentalange; Assistant referees: Takashi Kunori, Satoru Kawano; Fourth official: Tatsuya Hyōdō

4 October 1995 2nd-14	Cerezo Osaka	1–2	Sanfrecce Hiroshima	Osaka Nagai No.2 Stadium
19:04 JST (UTC+09)	Bernardo 84'	J. League	Noh 79'; Takagi 89'	Attendance: 8,098; Referee: Yasuhiro Matsuzaki; Assistant referees: Morihisa Yamaguchi, Mitsuyoshi Nakaguma; Fourth official: Sōichirō Kaneko; Man of the Match: Takuya Takagi

7 October 1995 2nd-15	Sanfrecce Hiroshima	2–1	Kashiwa Reysol	Hiroshima Stadium
16:05 JST (UTC+09)	Noh 1'; Michiki 11'	J. League	Bentinho 19'	Attendance: 7,215; Referee: Keiichi Sunakawa; Assistant referees: Naoki Esumi, Kōji Minami; Fourth official: Yutaka Miyake; Man of the Match: Noh Jung-Yoon

14 October 1995 2nd-16	Sanfrecce Hiroshima	5–0	Gamba Osaka	Hiroshima Big Arch
15:05 JST (UTC+09)	Takagi 16'; Moriyama 22'; Noh 56', 85'; Van Loen 76'	J. League		Attendance: 10,912; Referee: Kiyoshi Ōta; Assistant referees: Yasuhiro Hemmi, Akihisa Makino; Fourth official: Kōji Ueno; Man of the Match: Takuya Takagi

18 October 1995 2nd-17	Urawa Red Diamonds	2–1	Sanfrecce Hiroshima	Urawa Komaba Stadium
19:03 JST (UTC+09)	Hirose 9'; Tsuchihashi 25'	J. League	Huistra 55'	Attendance: 19,878; Referee: Yasuhiro Matsuzaki; Assistant referees: Yū Nakamura, Noboru Ishiyama; Fourth official: Toshimitsu Yasumoto

21 October 1995 2nd-18	Sanfrecce Hiroshima	2–1	Bellmare Hiratsuka	Tottori Stadium
18:30 JST (UTC+09)	Takagi 3', 54'	J. League	Simão 53'	Attendance: 12,734; Referee: Zoran Petrović; Assistant referees: Satoru Kawano, Kōji Minami; Fourth official: Hiroshi Nishimura; Man of the Match: Takuya Takagi

1 November 1995 2nd-19	Yokohama Marinos	2–1	Sanfrecce Hiroshima	Yokohama Mitsuzawa Football Stadium
19:04 JST (UTC+09)	Bisconti 61'; Medina Bello 71'	J. League	Noh 67'	Attendance: 10,638; Referee: Zoran Petrović; Assistant referees: Noboru Ishiyama, Ichirō Inukai; Fourth official: Hiroshi Yamauchi

4 November 1995 2nd-20	JEF United Ichihara	4–2	Sanfrecce Hiroshima	Ichihara Stadium
15:03 JST (UTC+09)	Rufer 2', 29', 65'; Maslovar 41'	J. League	Uemura 58'; Noh 76'	Attendance: 14,624; Referee: Hideo Kikuchi; Assistant referees: Mitsuru Satō, Akihisa Makino; Fourth official: Katsuhiko Takayama

8 November 1995 2nd-21	Sanfrecce Hiroshima	2–0	Júbilo Iwata	Hiroshima Stadium
19:03 JST (UTC+09)	Mori 1', 79'	J. League		Attendance: 7,194; Referee: Kazuo Kakihana; Assistant referees: Yoshikazu Hiroshima, Tōru Yamashiro; Fourth official: Kazuhiko Matsumura; Man of the Match: Hideaki Mori

11 November 1995 2nd-22	Sanfrecce Hiroshima	0–2	Nagoya Grampus Eight	Hiroshima Big Arch
14:03 JST (UTC+09)		J. League	Asano 27'; Ogura 57'	Attendance: 12,170; Referee: Tetsuya Hamana; Assistant referees: Hideaki Harada, Hiroyuki Izumi; Fourth official: Satoshi Hanashige

15 November 1995 2nd-23	Kashima Antlers	2–1 (V-goal) (a.e.t.)	Sanfrecce Hiroshima	Kashima Soccer Stadium
19:04 JST (UTC+09)	Manaka 83' 99'	J. League	Huistra 4'	Attendance: 15,648; Referee: Jamal Al-Sharif; Assistant referees: Tatsumi Ōno, Hiroshi Fukuda; Fourth official: Tōru Kamikawa

18 November 1995 2nd-24	Sanfrecce Hiroshima	3–1	Verdy Kawasaki	Hiroshima Big Arch
19:02 JST (UTC+09)	Noh 20', 73'; Takagi 38'	J. League	Miura 8'	Attendance: 20,265; Referee: Shinichirō Obata; Assistant referees: Yoshikazu Hiroshima, Mitsuyoshi Nakaguma; Fourth official: Syūji Kagawa; Man of the Match: Noh Jung-Yoon

22 November 1995 2nd-25	Yokohama Flügels	4–3 (V-goal) (a.e.t.)	Sanfrecce Hiroshima	Yokohama Mitsuzawa Football Stadium
19:04 JST (UTC+09)	Yoshida 35'; Zinho 71', 74'; Mitsuoka 101'	J. League	Huistra 18'; Noh 58'; Moriyasu 83'	Attendance: 9,086; Referee: Armando Perez; Assistant referees: Noboru Ishiyama, Hisaharu Kitamura; Fourth official: Ryū Tetsusashi

25 November 1995 2nd-26	Sanfrecce Hiroshima	0–2	Shimizu S-Pulse	Hiroshima Big Arch
15:03 JST (UTC+09)		J. League	Santos 11'; Sawanobori 86' (pen.)	Attendance: 10,098; Referee: Kiyoshi Ōta; Assistant referees: Yasuhiro Hemmi, Satoru Kawano; Fourth official: Norio Kuriyama

=== Emperor's Cup ===
3 December 1995 1st Round	Komazawa University	2–3	Sanfrecce Hiroshima	Yamaguchi Ishin Park Stadium
: JST (UTC+09)	Morita ?'; Yoneyama ?'		Huistra ?'; Noh ?'; Takagi ?'

10 December 1995 2nd Round	Bellmare Hiratsuka	0–1	Sanfrecce Hiroshima	Hiratsuka Stadium
: JST (UTC+09)			Takagi ?'

17 December 1995 Quarterfinals	Sanfrecce Hiroshima	1–0	Verdy Kawasaki	Maebashi Athletic Stadium
: JST (UTC+09)	Takagi ?'

23 December 1995 Semifinals	Gamba Osaka	1–2	Sanfrecce Hiroshima	Kobe Universiade Memorial Stadium
: JST (UTC+09)	Kondō ?'		Takagi ?'; Huistra ?'	Attendance: 15,526

1 January 1996 Final	Nagoya Grampus Eight	3–0	Sanfrecce Hiroshima	Tokyo National Stadium
: JST (UTC+09)	Ogura ?', ?'; Hirano ?'			Attendance: 47,021

== Player statistics ==
Pos.	Nat.	Player	D.o.B. (Age)	Height / Weight	J.League		Emperor's Cup		Total	
Pos.	Nat.	Player	D.o.B. (Age)	Height / Weight	Apps	Goals	Apps	Goals	Apps	Goals
MF	(Japan)	Yahiro Kazama	October 16, 1961 (aged 33)	173 cm / 69 kg	25	0	1	0	26	0
FW/MF	(Czech Republic)	Ivan Hašek	September 6, 1963 (aged 31)	171 cm / 65 kg	23	11	0	0	23	11
DF	(Japan)	Yasuyuki Satō	April 12, 1966 (aged 28)	176 cm / 67 kg	43	0	2	0	45	0
FW	(Netherlands)	Pieter Huistra	January 18, 1967 (aged 28)	184 cm / 71 kg	35	6	5	2	40	8
FW	(Japan)	Takumi Shima	October 3, 1967 (aged 27)	169 cm / 69 kg	0	0				
DF	(Japan)	Yoshirō Moriyama	November 9, 1967 (aged 27)	176 cm / 72 kg	24	2	3	0	27	2
FW	(Japan)	Takuya Takagi	November 12, 1967 (aged 27)	188 cm / 82 kg	24	5	5	4	29	9
MF	(Japan)	Akinobu Yokouchi	November 30, 1967 (aged 27)	173 cm / 68 kg	2	0	0	0	2	0
GK	(Japan)	Kazuya Maekawa	March 22, 1968 (aged 26)	188 cm / 84 kg	37	0	5	0	42	0
MF	(Japan)	Mitsuaki Kojima	July 14, 1968 (aged 26)	173 cm / 72 kg	33	0	5	0	38	0
MF	(Japan)	Hajime Moriyasu	August 23, 1968 (aged 26)	173 cm / 62 kg	25	4	5	0	30	4
DF	(Norway)	Tore Pedersen	September 29, 1969 (aged 25)	185 cm / 79 kg	0	0	0	0	0	0
GK	(Japan)	Kazumasa Kawano	November 7, 1970 (aged 24)	185 cm / 80 kg	15	0	0	0	15	0
FW	(South Korea)	Noh Jung-Yoon	March 28, 1971 (aged 23)	171 cm / 68 kg	38	13	5	1	43	14
DF	(Japan)	Tomohiro Katanosaka	April 18, 1971 (aged 23)	172 cm / 71 kg	6	1	0	0	6	1
MF	(Japan)	Hiroyoshi Kuwabara	October 2, 1971 (aged 23)	178 cm / 73 kg	31	0	5	0	36	0
DF	(Japan)	Takashi Ōnishi	October 16, 1971 (aged 23)	177 cm / 70 kg	17	0	0	0	17	0
FW	(Japan)	Kenji Wakamatsu	August 16, 1972 (aged 22)	179 cm / 78 kg	0	0				
DF	(Japan)	Hiroshige Yanagimoto	October 15, 1972 (aged 22)	174 cm / 66 kg	50	0	5	0	55	0
DF	(Japan)	Hideaki Mori	October 16, 1972 (aged 22)	183 cm / 76 kg	36	4	0	0	36	4
MF	(Japan)	Hideaki Hagino	January 20, 1973 (aged 22)	173 cm / 66 kg	1	0	0	0	1	0
FW	(Japan)	Yoshihiro Nishida	January 30, 1973 (aged 22)	175 cm / 73 kg	0	0				
FW	(Japan)	Masato Fue	February 22, 1973 (aged 22)	174 cm / 69 kg	33	2	5	0	38	2
FW	(Japan)	Yasumasa Makino	July 1, 1973 (aged 21)	172 cm / 65 kg	0	0				
DF	(Japan)	Ryūji Michiki	August 25, 1973 (aged 21)	174 cm / 69 kg	44	5	3	0	47	5
DF	(Japan)	Kenichi Uemura	April 22, 1974 (aged 20)	180 cm / 70 kg	46	4	4	0	50	4
MF	(Japan)	Yūta Abe	July 31, 1974 (aged 20)	177 cm / 70 kg	0	0				
MF	(Brazil)	Andrey	September 23, 1974 (aged 20)	178 cm / 69 kg	0	0	0	0	0	0
GK	(Japan)	Takashi Shimoda	November 28, 1975 (aged 19)	183 cm / 74 kg	5	0	0	0	5	0
MF	(Japan)	Kōji Yoshimura	April 13, 1976 (aged 18)	177 cm / 67 kg	0	0				
MF	(Japan)	Tatsuhiko Kubo	June 18, 1976 (aged 18)	181 cm / 71 kg	0	0				
FW	(Japan)	Iwao Yamane	July 31, 1976 (aged 18)	168 cm / 64 kg	6	0	0	0	6	0
GK	(Japan)	Masato Tamada	August 25, 1976 (aged 18)	188 cm / 84 kg	0	0				
MF	(Japan)	Kazutoshi Miura	March 7, 1977 (aged 18)	169 cm / 67 kg	0	0				
FW	(Netherlands)	Van Loen †	February 4, 1965 (aged 30)	193 cm / 82 kg	36	9	1	0	37	9
GK	(Japan)	Toshikazu Katō †	April 22, 1969 (aged 25)	cm / – kg	0	0	0	0	0	0
FW	(Japan)	Susumu Ōki †	February 23, 1976 (aged 19)	177 cm / 75 kg	14	2	1	0	15	2
MF	(Japan)	Tsukimitsu Mizuta †	September 13, 1976 (aged 18)	174 cm / 71 kg	0	0				
DF	(Japan)	Masayuki Ōmori †	November 9, 1976 (aged 18)	cm / – kg	0	0				

- † player(s) joined the team after the opening of this season.

== Transfers ==
In:

No.	Pos.	Nation	Player
—	GK	JPN	Masato Tamada (from Omiya Higashi High School)
—	MF	JPN	Hideaki Hagino (from Sapporo University)
—	MF	JPN	Kōji Yoshimura (from Tatara Gakuen High School)
—	MF	JPN	Tatsuhiko Kubo (from Chikuyo Gakuen High School)
—	FW	NED	Pieter Egge Huistra (from Rangers)
—	FW	JPN	Yoshihiro Nishida (from Doshisha University)
—	FW	JPN	Iwao Yamane (from Hiroshima Minami High School)

Out:

No.	Pos.	Nation	Player
—	GK	JPN	Akira Kawaguchi (to Nagoya Grampus Eight)
—	GK	JPN	Kazuyori Mochizuki (retired)
—	DF	JPN	Hiroshi Matsuda (to Vissel Kobe)
—	DF	JPN	Nobuhiro Ueno (retired)
—	DF	JPN	Kunihiko Akahane
—	MF	JPN	Yasutaka Yoshida (to Cosmo Oil)
—	MF	JPN	Masakazu Kōda (to Vissel Kobe)
—	MF	JPN	Tetsuya Tanaka (to Vissel Kobe)
—	FW	CZE	Pavel Černý
—	FW	JPN	Shirō Hashimitsu
—	FW	JPN	Kazuo Sumata

== Transfers during the season ==
=== In ===
- (Japan) Toshikazu Katō (from Sanfrecce Hiroshima satellite team GK coach)
- (Netherlands) John van Loen (from Feyenoord on March)
- (Japan) Tsukimitsu Mizuta (from Kunimi High School)
- (Japan) Susumu Ōki (from Aoyama Gakuin University)
- (Japan) Masayuki Ōmori

=== Out ===
- (Norway) Tore Pedersen (on March)
- (Brazil) Andrey (on November)
- (Japan) Tomohiro Katanosaka (to Kashiwa Reysol)

== Awards ==
none

== Other pages ==
- (in Japanese) J. League official site
- (in Japanese) Sanfrecce Hiroshima official site
