= 1993 Sanfrecce Hiroshima season =

Sanfrecce Hiroshima
1993 season
- Manager: Stuart Baxter
- Stadium: Hiroshima Stadium
- J.League: 5th
- Emperor's Cup: Semifinals
- J.League Cup: GL-A 7th
- Top goalscorer: League: Takuya Takagi (11); All: Pavel Černý (14)
- Highest home attendance: 14,605 (vs Urawa Red Diamonds, 5 June 1993); 36,863 (vs Verdy Kawasaki, 22 May 1993, Hiroshima Big Arch)
- Lowest home attendance: 9,672 (vs Nagoya Grampus Eight, 8 December 1993)
- Average home league attendance: 16,644
Home colours	Away colours

1993 Sanfrecce Hiroshima season

== Review and events ==
=== League results summary ===
Overall								Home						Away					
Pld	W	D	L	GF	GA	GD	Pts	W	D	L	GF	GA	GD	W	D	L	GF	GA	GD
36	18	0	18	54	49	+5	54	9	0	9	24	20	+4	9	0	9	30	29	+1

Source: J.LEAGUE OFFICIAL RECORD & DATA 1994. ISBN 4-09-102309-6.

=== League results by round ===
J.League Suntory series (first stage)
Round	1	2	3	4	5	6	7	8	9	10	11	12	13	14	15	16	17	18
Ground	H	A	H	H	A	A	H	A	H	H	A	A	H	H	A	H	A	A
Result	W	L	L	W	W	W	W	W	L	L	L	L	L	W	L	W	W	L
Position	3	6	8	7	5	3	2	2	2	3	5	6	8	6	6	6	6	6

Source: J.LEAGUE OFFICIAL RECORD & DATA 1994. ISBN 4-09-102309-6.
A = Away; H = Home; W = Win; D = Draw; L = Loss

J.League NICOS series (second stage)
Round	1	2	3	4	5	6	7	8	9	10	11	12	13	14	15	16	17	18
Ground	H	A	H	H	A	A	A	A	A	H	A	A	H	H	H	H	H	A
Result	W	L	W	L	L	W	L	W	L	L	W	W	L	L	L	W	W	W
Position	1	3	2	4	4	4	5	3	5	6	4	4	5	6	7	7	5	5

Source: J.LEAGUE OFFICIAL RECORD & DATA 1994. ISBN 4-09-102309-6.
A = Away; H = Home; W = Win; D = Draw; L = Loss

== Competitions ==
Competitions	Position
J.League	5th / 10 clubs
Emperor's Cup	Semifinals
J.League Cup	GL-A 7th / 7 clubs

== Domestic results ==
=== J.League ===
==== Suntory series ====
16 May 1993 1st-1	Sanfrecce Hiroshima	2–1	JEF United Ichihara	Hiroshima Stadium
13:59 JST (UTC+09)	Kazama 1'; Kojima 82'	J. League	Pavel 67'	Attendance: 11,875; Referee: Hiroyuki Umemoto; Assistant referees: Yoshikazu Hiroshima, Hiroshi Tanabe

19 May 1993 1st-2	Shimizu S-Pulse	1–0	Sanfrecce Hiroshima	Nihondaira Sports Stadium
18:58 JST (UTC+09)	Toninho 16'	J. League		Attendance: 9,183; Referee: Kōetsu Kikuchi; Assistant referees: Yoshio Sawada, Yoshimi Ogawa

22 May 1993 1st-3	Sanfrecce Hiroshima	1–2	Verdy Kawasaki	Hiroshima Big Arch
18:31 JST (UTC+09)	Matsuda 44'	J. League	Meijer 37'; Takeda 39'	Attendance: 36,863; Referee: Yōtarō Moritsu; Assistant referees: Sōichirō Kaneko, Masanori Watanabe

26 May 1993 1st-4	Sanfrecce Hiroshima	1–0	Yokohama Marinos	Hiroshima Stadium
18:59 JST (UTC+09)	Takagi 57'	J. League		Attendance: 12,858; Referee: Kenji Tanaka; Assistant referees: Morihisa Yamaguchi, Masanori Watanabe; Fourth official: Shinji Saga

29 May 1993 1st-5	Yokohama Flügels	1–2	Sanfrecce Hiroshima	Kagoshima Kamoike Stadium
15:02 JST (UTC+09)	Angelo 11'	J. League	Černý 51'; Kazama 80'	Attendance: 15,141; Referee: Martin Bodenham; Assistant referees: Fumikazu Shioyazono, Hideaki Harada; Fourth official: Shōji Hamada

2 June 1993 1st-6	Nagoya Grampus Eight	1–4	Sanfrecce Hiroshima	Nagoya Mizuho Football Stadium
19:00 JST (UTC+09)	Pita 55' (pen.)	J. League	Takagi 6'; Kojima 47'; Kazama 72'; Moriyasu 78'	Attendance: 11,466; Referee: Kōetsu Kikuchi; Assistant referees: Yoshio Sawada, Yasushi Tsuchimoto; Fourth official: Takayoshi Kashino

5 June 1993 1st-7	Sanfrecce Hiroshima	1–0	Urawa Red Diamonds	Hiroshima Stadium
18:32 JST (UTC+09)	Moriyama 71'	J. League		Attendance: 14,605; Referee: Yōtarō Moritsu; Assistant referees: Yoshikazu Hiroshima, Hiroshi Tanabe

9 June 1993 1st-8	Gamba Osaka	1–1 (a.s.d.e.t.) (3–4 p)	Sanfrecce Hiroshima	Expo '70 Commemorative Stadium
19:00 JST (UTC+09)	Matsunami 31'	J. League	Černý 10'	Attendance: 19,351; Referee: Kenji Tanaka; Assistant referees: Morihisa Yamaguchi, Sōichirō Kaneko; Fourth official: Yoshikazu Hiroshima
	Penalties
	(penalty scored) Müller; (penalty scored) Flavio; (penalty missed) Wada; (penalty scored) Isogai; (penalty missed) Matsunami		(penalty scored) Kazama; (penalty scored) Černý; (penalty scored) Moriyama; (penalty scored) Katanosaka

12 June 1993 1st-9	Sanfrecce Hiroshima	0–1	Kashima Antlers	Ehime Matsuyama Athletic Stadium
18:33 JST (UTC+09)		J. League	Kurosaki 36'	Attendance: 25,131; Referee: Hiroyuki Umemoto; Assistant referees: Sōichirō Kaneko, Hiroshi Tanabe

16 June 1993 1st-10	Sanfrecce Hiroshima	0–3	Shimizu S-Pulse	Hiroshima Stadium
19:01 JST (UTC+09)		J. League	Aoshima 7'; Ōenoki 41'; Hasegawa 47'	Attendance: 13,923; Referee: Martin Bodenham; Assistant referees: Kōetsu Kikuchi, Sōichirō Kaneko; Fourth official: Kōji Ueno

19 June 1993 1st-11	JEF United Ichihara	1–0	Sanfrecce Hiroshima	Ichihara Stadium
17:02 JST (UTC+09)	Littbarski 4'	J. League		Attendance: 9,042; Referee: Kōetsu Kikuchi; Assistant referees: Satoru Ishizawa, Masahiro Katagiri; Fourth official: Shigeaki Yoshiya

23 June 1993 1st-12	Yokohama Marinos	3–2	Sanfrecce Hiroshima	Yokohama Mitsuzawa Football Stadium
18:59 JST (UTC+09)	Bisconti 12', 25'; Díaz 31'	J. League	Noh 47', 56'	Attendance: 11,863; Referee: Tetsuya Hamana; Assistant referees: Keiichi Sunakawa, Kazuaki Hamaguchi; Fourth official: Jōji Kashihara

26 June 1993 1st-13	Sanfrecce Hiroshima	1–2 (a.s.d.e.t.)	Yokohama Flügels	Hiroshima Stadium
18:34 JST (UTC+09)	Katanosaka 24'	J. League	Watanabe 3'; Sorimachi 94'	Attendance: 13,680; Referee: Yōtarō Moritsu; Assistant referees: Morihisa Yamaguchi, Hiroshi Tanabe; Fourth official: Masahiro Katsuyama

30 June 1993 1st-14	Sanfrecce Hiroshima	2–0	Nagoya Grampus Eight	Hiroshima Stadium
19:01 JST (UTC+09)	Moriyasu 39'; Takagi 62'	J. League		Attendance: 9,709; Referee: Martin Bodenham; Assistant referees: Kōetsu Kikuchi, Masanori Watanabe; Fourth official: Mamoru Ueda

3 July 1993 1st-15	Urawa Red Diamonds	1–0	Sanfrecce Hiroshima	Urawa Komaba Stadium
18:31 JST (UTC+09)	Matsumoto 59'	J. League		Attendance: 9,013; Referee: Fumikazu Shioyazono; Assistant referees: Takashi Kunori, Naotsugu Fuse; Fourth official: Morihiko Yamaji

7 July 1993 1st-16	Sanfrecce Hiroshima	4–3 (a.s.d.e.t.)	Gamba Osaka	Hiroshima Stadium
19:03 JST (UTC+09)	Kazama 19'; Černý 46'; Matsuda 70'; Takagi 90'	J. League	Matsunami 23'; Müller 43', 59'	Attendance: 12,731; Referee: Hiroyuki Umemoto; Assistant referees: Kazunori Okada, Hiroshi Tanabe; Fourth official: Ryōichi Nishida

10 July 1993 1st-17	Kashima Antlers	1–2 (a.s.d.e.t.)	Sanfrecce Hiroshima	Kashima Soccer Stadium
18:32 JST (UTC+09)	Hasegawa 71'	J. League	Černý 58'; Takagi 99'	Attendance: 15,055; Referee: Shizuo Takada; Assistant referees: Takashi Kunori, Kimio Izaki; Fourth official: Ichirō Inukai

14 July 1993 1st-18	Verdy Kawasaki	2–0	Sanfrecce Hiroshima	Kawasaki Todoroki Stadium
19:04 JST (UTC+09)	Takeda 35'; Hanssen 66'	J. League		Attendance: 10,100; Referee: Tatsumi Ōno; Assistant referees: Keiichi Sunakawa, Takeshi Ōkura; Fourth official: Hideo Teranishi

==== NICOS series ====
24 July 1993 2nd-1	Sanfrecce Hiroshima	4–0	Urawa Red Diamonds	Hiroshima Stadium
18:33 JST (UTC+09)	Kazama 17', 73'; Noh 36'; Kenichi Uemura 40'	J. League		Attendance: 13,067; Referee: Martin Bodenham; Assistant referees: Kōetsu Kikuchi, Hiroshi Tanabe; Fourth official: Satoshi Hanashige

31 July 1993 2nd-2	Shimizu S-Pulse	2–1 (a.s.d.e.t.)	Sanfrecce Hiroshima	Nihondaira Sports Stadium
18:29 JST (UTC+09)	Mukōjima 80'; Hasegawa 92'	J. League	Vonderburg 9'	Attendance: 8,991; Referee: Masayoshi Okada; Assistant referees: Yoshio Sawada, Yoshimi Ogawa; Fourth official: Takuji Fukazawa

4 August 1993 2nd-3	Sanfrecce Hiroshima	3–0	Yokohama Flügels	Hiroshima Stadium
19:03 JST (UTC+09)	Tanaka 47'; Noh 58'; Černý 89'	J. League		Attendance: 12,758; Referee: Shinichirō Obata; Assistant referees: Kazunori Okada, Masanori Watanabe; Fourth official: Kōji Hanaguchi

8 August 1993 2nd-4	Sanfrecce Hiroshima	0–2	Gamba Osaka	Hiroshima Big Arch
19:03 JST (UTC+09)	Nagashima 49'; Kudaka 75'	J. League		Attendance: 34,872; Referee: Kenji Tanaka; Assistant referees: Kazuo Kakihana, Hiroshi Tanabe; Fourth official: Satoru Yamada

14 August 1993 2nd-5	Verdy Kawasaki	3–0	Sanfrecce Hiroshima	Kawasaki Todoroki Stadium
19:02 JST (UTC+09)	Ramos 1'; Miura 41'; Takeda 63'	J. League		Attendance: 10,195; Referee: Shizuo Takada; Assistant referees: Keiichi Sunakawa, Masato Nogami; Fourth official: Nobuhiro Shirai

20 August 1993 2nd-6	Yokohama Marinos	1–2 (a.s.d.e.t.)	Sanfrecce Hiroshima	Yokohama Mitsuzawa Football Stadium
19:03 JST (UTC+09)	Díaz 40'	J. League	Matsuda 33'; Takagi 102'	Attendance: 14,102; Referee: Masayoshi Okada; Assistant referees: Keiichi Sunakawa, Noboru Ishiyama; Fourth official: Noriyuki Sasaki

25 August 1993 2nd-7	Kashima Antlers	4–3 (a.s.d.e.t.)	Sanfrecce Hiroshima	Kashima Soccer Stadium
19:04 JST (UTC+09)	Zico 33'; Kurosaki 47', 49'; Yoshida 115'	J. League	Takagi 5', 43'; Katanosaka 89'	Attendance: 13,923; Referee: Shizuo Takada; Assistant referees: Hisashi Uemura, Kazuaki Hamaguchi; Fourth official: Ichirō Inukai

28 August 1993 2nd-8	JEF United Ichihara	1–3	Sanfrecce Hiroshima	Ichihara Stadium
18:32 JST (UTC+09)	Pavel 18'	J. League	Černý 2'; Kojima 50'; Takagi 68'	Attendance: 10,515; Referee: Masayoshi Okada; Assistant referees: Hiroshi Fukuda, Masahiro Katagiri; Fourth official: Terunobu Kakinuma

3 September 1993 2nd-9	Nagoya Grampus Eight	1–0	Sanfrecce Hiroshima	Nagoya Mizuho Football Stadium
19:01 JST (UTC+09)	Yonekura 50'	J. League		Attendance: 11,016; Referee: Hideo Kikuchi; Assistant referees: Yoshio Sawada, Yasushi Tsuchimoto; Fourth official: Takayoshi Kashino

6 November 1993 2nd-10	Sanfrecce Hiroshima	0–0 (a.s.d.e.t.) (4–5 p)	Shimizu S-Pulse	Bingo Stadium
14:02 JST (UTC+09)		J. League		Attendance: 10,199; Referee: Hideo Kikuchi; Assistant referees: Yoshitsugu Katayama, Masanori Watanabe; Fourth official: Hiroshi Saeki
	Penalties
	(penalty scored) Kazama; (penalty scored) Matsuda; (penalty scored) Moriyama; (penalty scored) Moriyasu; (penalty missed) Katanosaka		(penalty scored) Sugimoto; (penalty scored) Miura; (penalty scored) Ōta; (penalty scored) Sawanobori; (penalty scored) Hiraoka

10 November 1993 2nd-11	Urawa Red Diamonds	1–2	Sanfrecce Hiroshima	Urawa Komaba Stadium
19:01 JST (UTC+09)	Hirose 33'	J. League	Noh 11'; Černý 23'	Attendance: 8,258; Referee: Shizuo Takada; Assistant referees: Yū Nakamura, Mitsuru Satō; Fourth official: Hisaharu Kitamura

13 November 1993 2nd-12	Gamba Osaka	3–6	Sanfrecce Hiroshima	Expo '70 Commemorative Stadium
15:33 JST (UTC+09)	Nagashima 27'; Minobe 33'; Isogai 58'	J. League	Takagi 25', 60'; Černý 43'; Noh 67'; Jönsson 75'; Moriyama 85'	Attendance: 19,290; Referee: Juan Carlos Crespi; Assistant referees: Kōetsu Kikuchi, Yoshikazu Hiroshima; Fourth official: Tsuyoshi Miyake

17 November 1993 2nd-13	Sanfrecce Hiroshima	1–3	Verdy Kawasaki	Hiroshima Stadium
19:04 JST (UTC+09)	Katanosaka 61'	J. League	Miura 24', 29'; Takeda 89'	Attendance: 13,906; Referee: Hiroyuki Umemoto; Assistant referees: Kazuo Kakihana, Hiroshi Tanabe; Fourth official: Shinya Sasamoto

21 November 1993 2nd-14	Sanfrecce Hiroshima	1–2	Yokohama Marinos	Oita Athletic Stadium
13:04 JST (UTC+09)	Shima 21'	J. League	Miura 55'; Mizunuma 67'	Attendance: 14,640; Referee: Shinichirō Obata; Assistant referees: Morihisa Yamaguchi, Yū Nakamura; Fourth official: Tsunenori Nagamatsu

27 November 1993 2nd-15	Sanfrecce Hiroshima	0–1	Kashima Antlers	Hiroshima Big Arch
14:02 JST (UTC+09)		J. League	Zico 22'	Attendance: 29,091; Referee: Masayoshi Okada; Assistant referees: Masanori Watanabe, Hiroshi Tanabe; Fourth official: Naoki Esumi

1 December 1993 2nd-16	Sanfrecce Hiroshima	2–0	JEF United Ichihara	Hiroshima Stadium
19:02 JST (UTC+09)	Shima 47', 66'	J. League		Attendance: 10,006; Referee: Hiroyuki Umemoto; Assistant referees: Kazuo Kakihana, Hiroshi Tanabe; Fourth official: Kazuyuki Tanimoto

8 December 1993 2nd-17	Sanfrecce Hiroshima	1–0 (a.s.d.e.t.)	Nagoya Grampus Eight	Hiroshima Stadium
19:03 JST (UTC+09)	Černý 106'	J. League		Attendance: 9,672; Referee: Juan Carlos Crespi; Assistant referees: Fumikazu Shioyazono, Yoshikazu Hiroshima; Fourth official: Shinji Saga

15 December 1993 2nd-18	Yokohama Flügels	1–2	Sanfrecce Hiroshima	Yokohama Mitsuzawa Football Stadium
19:04 JST (UTC+09)	Moner 89'	J. League	Černý 54'; Shima 71'	Attendance: 12,730; Referee: Kōetsu Kikuchi; Assistant referees: Keiichi Sunakawa, Kazuaki Hamaguchi; Fourth official: Masaki Yoshihara

=== Emperor's Cup ===
5 December 1993 1st Round	National Institute of Fitness and Sports in Kanoya	1–2	Sanfrecce Hiroshima	Hiroshima Stadium
: JST (UTC+09)	Kenmochi ?'		Moriyama ?'; Černý ?'

11 December 1993 2nd Round	Waseda University	0–2	Sanfrecce Hiroshima	Miyazaki Park Stadium
: JST (UTC+09)			Vonderburg ?'; Noh ?'

19 December 1993 Quarterfinals	Yokohama Marinos	1–3	Sanfrecce Hiroshima	Hiroshima Big Arch
: JST (UTC+09)	Miura 28'		Černý 38', 79'; Shima 53'	Attendance: 12,065

23 December 1993 Semifinals	Sanfrecce Hiroshima	1–2 (a.e.t.)	Yokohama Flügels	Kobe Universiade Memorial Stadium
: JST (UTC+09)	Noh ?'		Maeda ?'; Moner ?'

=== J.League Cup ===
GL-A-1	bye

14 September 1993 GL-A-2	Sanfrecce Hiroshima	3–4 (a.s.d.e.t.)	Kashiwa Reysol	Hiroshima Stadium
19:02 JST (UTC+09)	Shima 44'; Černý 48'; Noh 63'	J. League	Careca 21', 38'; Ōkura 23'; Tani 96'	Attendance: 7,848; Referee: Juan Carlos Crespi; Assistant referees: Fumikazu Shioyazono, Masanori Watanabe; Fourth official: Norio Kuriyama

21 September 1993 GL-A-3	Shonan Bellmare	2–1 (a.s.d.e.t.)	Sanfrecce Hiroshima	Hiratsuka Stadium
19:00 JST (UTC+09)	Noguchi 26' 113'	J. League	Kojima 53'	Attendance: 10,205; Referee: Tatsumi Ōno; Assistant referees: Takashi Kunori, Kimio Izaki; Fourth official: Michio Nakahara

25 September 1993 GL-A-4	Sanfrecce Hiroshima	0–0 (a.s.d.e.t.) (1–4 p)	Verdy Kawasaki	Hiroshima Stadium
18:32 JST (UTC+09)		J. League		Attendance: 12,011; Referee: Shizuo Takada; Assistant referees: Kazunori Okada, Hiroshi Tanabe; Fourth official: Kazuhiko Matsumura
	Penalties
	(penalty scored) Matsuda; (penalty missed) Moriyama; (penalty missed) Kojima		(penalty scored) Pereira; (penalty scored) Kikuhara; (penalty scored) Nagai; (penalty scored) Sukigara

2 October 1993 GL-A-5	Kashima Antlers	1–2	Sanfrecce Hiroshima	Kashima Soccer Stadium
18:34 JST (UTC+09)	Manaka 34'	J. League	Wakamatsu 47'; Yokouchi 59'	Attendance: 14,587; Referee: Juan Carlos Crespi; Assistant referees: Hiroshi Fukuda, Takashi Kunori; Fourth official: Ichirō Inukai

9 October 1993 GL-A-6	Sanfrecce Hiroshima	0–1	JEF United Ichihara	Hiroshima Big Arch
18:02 JST (UTC+09)		J. League	Ejiri 86'	Attendance: 23,455; Referee: Shinichirō Obata; Assistant referees: Hiroshi Tanabe, Hideaki Harada; Fourth official: Katsuya Minokoshi

16 October 1993 GL-A-7	Gamba Osaka	5–0	Sanfrecce Hiroshima	Kyoto Nishikyogoku Stadium
18:33 JST (UTC+09)	Nagashima 10'; Yamaguchi 20', 63'; Metkov 44'; Matsunami 83'	J. League		Attendance: 13,831; Referee: Juan Carlos Crespi; Assistant referees: Noboru Ishiyama, Yoshikazu Hiroshima; Fourth official: Yoshitsugu Katayama

== Player statistics ==
Pos.	Nat.	Player	D.o.B. (Age)	Height / Weight	J.League		Emperor's Cup		J.League Cup		Total	
Pos.	Nat.	Player	D.o.B. (Age)	Height / Weight	Apps	Goals	Apps	Goals	Apps	Goals	Apps	Goals
FW	(Japan)	Shinichirō Takahashi	October 27, 1957 (aged 35)	171 cm / 65 kg	3	0	0	0	3	0	6	0
DF	(Japan)	Hiroshi Matsuda	September 2, 1960 (aged 32)	182 cm / 75 kg	36	3	2	0	5	0	43	3
MF	(Japan)	Yahiro Kazama	October 16, 1961 (aged 31)	173 cm / 68 kg	35	6	4	0	0	0	39	6
FW	(Czech Republic)	Pavel Černý	October 11, 1962 (aged 30)	181 cm / 80 kg	33	10	4	3	1	1	38	14
DF	(Sweden)	Vonderburg	July 31, 1964 (aged 28)	185 cm / 80 kg	21	1	4	1	2	0	27	2
MF	(Japan)	Nobuhiro Ueno	August 26, 1965 (aged 27)	176 cm / 70 kg	0	0		0	0	0		0
DF	(Japan)	Yoshinori Taguchi	September 14, 1965 (aged 27)	184 cm / 79 kg	6	0	0	0	0	0	6	0
DF	(Japan)	Yasuyuki Satō	April 12, 1966 (aged 27)	176 cm / 67 kg	8	0	0	0	4	0	12	0
DF	(Japan)	Yasutaka Yoshida	November 22, 1966 (aged 26)	179 cm / 77 kg	2	0	0	0	3	0	5	0
GK	(Japan)	Akira Kawaguchi	January 24, 1967 (aged 26)	188 cm / 83 kg	0	0		0	0	0		0
MF	(Japan)	Kenji Tomita	July 1, 1967 (aged 25)	171 cm / 68 kg	0	0		0	0	0		0
MF	(Japan)	Takumi Shima	October 3, 1967 (aged 25)	169 cm / 66 kg	9	4	4	1	6	1	19	6
MF	(Japan)	Yoshirō Moriyama	November 9, 1967 (aged 25)	175 cm / 70 kg	29	2	4	0	6	0	39	2
FW	(Japan)	Takuya Takagi	November 12, 1967 (aged 25)	184 cm / 82 kg	29	11	2	0	0	0	31	11
FW	(Japan)	Akinobu Yokouchi	November 30, 1967 (aged 25)	173 cm / 68 kg	2	0	2	0	5	1	9	1
MF	(United States)	Daniel Calichman	February 21, 1968 (aged 25)	181 cm / 80 kg	13	0	0	0	1	0	14	0
GK	(Japan)	Kazuya Maekawa	March 22, 1968 (aged 25)	189 cm / 89 kg	15	0	0	0	0	0	15	0
MF	(Japan)	Mitsuaki Kojima	July 14, 1968 (aged 24)	173 cm / 70 kg	27	3	3	0	6	1	36	4
MF	(Japan)	Hajime Moriyasu	August 23, 1968 (aged 24)	174 cm / 65 kg	35	2	4	1	0	0	39	3
MF	(Japan)	Masakazu Kōda	September 12, 1969 (aged 23)	172 cm / 61 kg	0	0	0	0	4	0	4	0
GK	(Japan)	Kazumasa Kawano	November 7, 1970 (aged 22)	185 cm / 79 kg	21	0	4	0	6	0	31	0
FW	(South Korea)	Noh Jung-Yoon	March 28, 1971 (aged 22)	172 cm / 68 kg	28	6	4	2	2	1	34	9
DF/MF	(Japan)	Tomohiro Katanosaka	April 18, 1971 (aged 22)	171 cm / 68 kg	35	3	4	0	6	0	45	3
MF	(Japan)	Tetsuya Tanaka	July 27, 1971 (aged 21)	176 cm / 63 kg	15	1	1	0	3	0	19	1
FW	(Japan)	Ryūji Nagata	March 28, 1972 (aged 21)	178 cm / 72 kg	1	0	0	0	0	0	1	0
FW	(Japan)	Kazuhiro Ogura	May 10, 1972 (aged 21)	177 cm / 74 kg	0	0		0	0	0		0
FW	(Japan)	Kenji Wakamatsu	August 16, 1972 (aged 20)	179 cm / 76 kg	0	0		0	4	1		0
DF	(Japan)	Kunihiko Akabane	August 20, 1972 (aged 20)	182 cm / 75 kg	0	0		0	0	0		0
DF	(Japan)	Hiroshige Yanagimoto	October 15, 1972 (aged 20)	175 cm / 66 kg	19	0	2	0	0	0	21	0
DF	(Japan)	Hideaki Mori	October 16, 1972 (aged 20)	182 cm / 76 kg	0	0		0	0	0		0
FW	(Japan)	Masato Fue	February 22, 1973 (aged 20)	175 cm / 67 kg	2	0	2	0	0	0	4	0
FW	(Japan)	Kazuo Sumata	May 1, 1973 (aged 20)	176 cm / 76 kg	0	0		0	0	0		0
FW	(Japan)	Yasumasa Makino	July 1, 1973 (aged 19)	173 cm / 67 kg	0	0		0	0	0		0
DF	(Japan)	Ryūji Michiki	August 25, 1973 (aged 19)	175 cm / 67 kg	0	0	0	0	0	0	0	0
DF	(Japan)	Kenichi Uemura	April 22, 1974 (aged 19)	180 cm / 70 kg	17	1	2	0	6	0	25	1
MF	(Japan)	Yūta Abe	July 31, 1974 (aged 18)	177 cm / 69 kg	0	0	0	0	2	0	2	0
MF	(Brazil)	Andrey	September 23, 1974 (aged 18)	177 cm / 69 kg	0	0		0	0	0		0
GK	(England)	Lee Baxter	June 17, 1976 (aged 16)	183 cm / 74 kg	0	0		0	0	0		0
MF	(Sweden)	Jan Jönsson †	May 24, 1960 (aged 32)	cm / - kg	6	1	0	0	0	0	6	1
GK	(Japan)	Kazuyori Mochizuki †	November 20, 1961 (aged 31)	cm / - kg	0	0		0	0	0		0

- † player(s) joined the team after the opening of this season.

== Transfers ==
In:

No.	Pos.	Nation	Player
—	DF	JPN	Yoshinori Taguchi (from Yokohama Flügels)
—	DF	SWE	Jean-Paul Vonderburg (from Malmö)
—	MF	JPN	Mitsuaki Kojima (from Fujitsu)
—	MF	KOR	Noh Jung-Yoon (from Korea University)
—	GK	JPN	Akira Kawaguchi (from Ẽfini Sapporo)
—	DF	JPN	Kenichi Uemura (from Matsunaga High School)
—	DF	JPN	Kunihiko Akabane (from Osaka Gas)
—	MF	JPN	Kenji Tomita (from Yokohama Flügels)
—	MF	BRA	Andrey Gustavo Santos (from Makuhari Senior High School)
—	MF	JPN	Yūta Abe (from Tatara Gakuen High School)
—	FW	JPN	Kenji Wakamatsu (from Fukuoka University)

Out:

No.	Pos.	Nation	Player
—	DF	TCH	Július Bielik
—	MF	JPN	Hirofumi Zaima
—	MF	JPN	Mitsuhiko Ogata
—	FW	JPN	Eiji Hirata
—	FW	JPN	Teruyuki Tahara
—	GK	JPN	Daisuke Matsuyama
—	DF	JPN	Yūichi Yoshimoto
—	DF	JPN	Kenji Kita
—	DF	JPN	Toshiaki Tsukioka
—	MF	JPN	Yūshi Makita
—	MF	JPN	Ken Michiki
—	MF	JPN	Koji Yoshikawa

== Transfers during the season ==
=== In ===
- (Sweden) Jan Jönsson
- (Japan) Kazuyori Mochizuki (from Sanfrecce Hiroshima GK coach)

=== Out ===
- (Sweden) Jan Jönsson (on December)

== Other pages ==
- (in Japanese) J. League official site
- (in Japanese) Sanfrecce Hiroshima official site
