= 1992 Sanfrecce Hiroshima season =

Sanfrecce Hiroshima
1992 season
- Manager: Stuart Baxter
- Stadium: Hiroshima Stadium
- Emperor's Cup: 2nd Round
- J.League Cup: GL 9th
- Top goalscorer: League: All: Pavel Černý (4); Takuya Takagi (4)
Home colours	Away colours

1992 Sanfrecce Hiroshima season

== Team name ==
Club name
Sanfrecce Hiroshima Football Club
Nickname
Sanfrecce

== Competitions ==
Competitions	Position
Emperor's Cup	2nd round
J.League Cup	GL 9th / 10 clubs

== Domestic results ==
=== Emperor's Cup ===
5 December 1992 1st Round	Sanfrecce Hiroshima	2–0	Doshisha University	Hofu Stadium
: JST (UTC+09:00)	Fue ?'; Černý ?'

6 December 1992 2nd Round	Sanfrecce Hiroshima	2–3 (a.e.t.)	Gamba Osaka	Hofu Stadium
: JST (UTC+09:00)	Černý ?'; Daniel ?'		Müller ?', ?'; Uemura ?'

=== J.League Cup ===
6 September 1992 GL-1	Sanfrecce Hiroshima	2–3	Verdy Kawasaki	Hiroshima Stadium
19:00 JST (UTC+09:00)	Moriyasu 25'; Takagi 51'	J. League	Pereira 40'; Tsunami 53'; Takeda 76'	Attendance: 13,861; Referee: Kenji Tanaka; Assistant referees: Kazuya Yanagisawa; Ryōichi Nishida; Fourth official: Shinji Saga

9 September 1992 GL-2	Sanfrecce Hiroshima	2–3 (sudden-death) (a.e.t.)	Urawa Red Diamonds	Hiroshima Stadium
18:30 JST (UTC+09:00)	Černý 55' (pen.); 77' (o.g.)	J. League	Fukuda 20'; Uehara 68'; Hashiratani 104'	Attendance: 3,128; Referee: Shizuo Takada; Assistant referees: Takayuki Kimura; Hiroshi Tanabe; Fourth official: Nakaya Sasaki

12 September 1992 GL-3	Shimizu S-Pulse	0–1	Sanfrecce Hiroshima	Nihondaira Sports Stadium
16:00 JST (UTC+09:00)		J. League	Tanaka 84'	Attendance: 5,699; Referee: Yōtarō Moritsu; Assistant referees: Keiji Hayashi; Yoshimi Ogawa; Fourth official: Takuji Fukazawa

19 September 1992 GL-4	Yokohama Marinos	3–2	Sanfrecce Hiroshima	Ehime Matsuyama Athletic Stadium
14:30 JST (UTC+09:00)	Jinno 24'; Renato 77'; Everton 86'	J. League	Takagi 28'; Fue 89'	Attendance: 3,262; Referee: Shinichirō Obata; Assistant referees: Mitsuo Kadota; Satoru Kawano; Fourth official: Tatsuya Hyōdō

23 September 1992 GL-5	Nagoya Grampus Eight	3–0	Sanfrecce Hiroshima	Nagoya Mizuho Football Stadium
15:00 JST (UTC+09:00)	Sawairi 1', 44'; T. Ogura 79'	J. League		Attendance: 12,070; Referee: Morihisa Yamaguchi; Assistant referees: Yōzō Tanaka; Naoyuki Mori; Fourth official: Noriaki Fukunaga

27 September 1992 GL-6	Sanfrecce Hiroshima	0–1	JEF United Ichihara	Hiroshima Stadium
19:00 JST (UTC+09:00)		J. League	Echigo 52'	Attendance: 4,388; Referee: Yōtarō Moritsu; Assistant referees: Kazunori Okada; Hiroshi Tanabe; Fourth official: Masahiro Katsuyama

4 October 1992 GL-7	Gamba Osaka	1–3	Sanfrecce Hiroshima	Okayama Stadium
18:30 JST (UTC+09:00)	Nagashima 37'	J. League	Daniel 14'; Tanaka 43'; Černý 64'	Attendance: 6,157; Referee: Hiroyuki Umemoto; Assistant referees: Mitsuo Kadota; Masanori Watanabe; Fourth official: Toshiharu Fujimura

7 October 1992 GL-8	Sanfrecce Hiroshima	5–1	Yokohama Flügels	Hiroshima Stadium
18:30 JST (UTC+09:00)	Takagi 3', 88'; Tanaka 15'; Shima 51'; Bielik 86'	J. League	Maeda 39'	Attendance: 3,291; Referee: Kōetsu Kikuchi; Assistant referees: Masanori Watanabe; Ryōichi Nishida; Fourth official: Mamoru Ueda

11 October 1992 GL-9	Sanfrecce Hiroshima	0–3	Kashima Antlers	Hiroshima Stadium
14:00 JST (UTC+09:00)		J. League	Zico 19', 30', 84'	Attendance: 9,853; Referee: Hiroyuki Umemoto; Assistant referees: Yōtarō Moritsu; Takayuki Kimura; Fourth official: Kōji Ueno

== Player statistics ==
Pos.	Nat.	Player	D.o.B. (Age)	Height / Weight	Emperor's Cup		J.League Cup		Total	
Pos.	Nat.	Player	D.o.B. (Age)	Height / Weight	Apps	Goals	Apps	Goals	Apps	Goals
MF	(Japan)	Shinichirō Takahashi	October 27, 1957 (aged 34)	171 cm / 65 kg		0	3	0		0
MF	(Japan)	Yahiro Kazama	October 16, 1961 (aged 30)	173 cm / 67 kg		0	6	0		0
DF	(Czechoslovakia)	Július Bielik	March 8, 1962 (aged 30)	173 cm / 68 kg		0	6	1		1
FW	(Czechoslovakia)	Pavel Černý	October 11, 1962 (aged 29)	181 cm / 80 kg	2	2	8	2	10	4
MF	(Japan)	Yūshi Makita	January 10, 1964 (aged 28)	174 cm / 64 kg		0	0	0		0
MF	(Japan)	Hirofumi Zaima	April 2, 1964 (aged 28)	175 cm / 70 kg		0	0	0		0
DF	(Japan)	Nobuhiro Ueno	August 26, 1965 (aged 27)	175 cm / 70 kg		0	8	0		0
DF	(Japan)	Yasuyuki Satō	April 12, 1966 (aged 26)	176 cm / 67 kg		0	0	0		0
FW	(Japan)	Eiji Hirata	May 16, 1966 (aged 26)	175 cm / 65 kg		0	0	0		0
DF	(Japan)	Yasutaka Yoshida	November 22, 1966 (aged 25)	179 cm / 77 kg		0	3	0		0
FW	(Japan)	Takumi Shima	October 3, 1967 (aged 24)	170 cm / 65 kg		0	8	1		1
MF	(Japan)	Yoshirō Moriyama	November 9, 1967 (aged 24)	175 cm / 72 kg		0	6	0		0
FW	(Japan)	Takuya Takagi	November 12, 1967 (aged 24)	188 cm / 82 kg		0	7	4		4
MF	(Japan)	Akinobu Yokouchi	November 30, 1967 (aged 24)	172 cm / 64 kg		0	4	0		0
DF	(United States)	Daniel Calichman	February 21, 1968 (aged 24)	181 cm / 81 kg		1	6	1		2
GK	(Japan)	Kazuya Maekawa	March 22, 1968 (aged 24)	188 cm / 84 kg		0	1	0		0
FW	(Japan)	Teruyuki Tahara	May 3, 1968 (aged 24)	173 cm / 67 kg		0	0	0		0
MF	(Japan)	Hajime Moriyasu	August 23, 1968 (aged 24)	173 cm / 62 kg		0	8	1		1
MF	(Japan)	Mitsuhiko Ogata	March 26, 1969 (aged 23)	163 cm / 63 kg		0	0	0		0
FW	(Japan)	Masakazu Kōda	September 12, 1969 (aged 22)	172 cm / 61 kg		0	0	0		0
DF	(Japan)	Kenji Kita	May 28, 1970 (aged 22)	175 cm / 70 kg		0	0	0		0
GK	(Japan)	Kazumasa Kawano	November 7, 1970 (aged 21)	186 cm / 78 kg		0	8	0		0
DF	(Japan)	Tomohiro Katanosaka	April 18, 1971 (aged 21)	172 cm / 69 kg		0	9	0		0
MF	(Japan)	Tetsuya Tanaka	July 27, 1971 (aged 21)	176 cm / 63 kg		0	9	3		3
DF	(Japan)	Toshiaki Tsukioka	November 14, 1971 (aged 20)	171 cm / 63 kg		0	0	0		0
DF	(Japan)	Yūichi Yoshimoto	March 25, 1972 (aged 20)	170 cm / 65 kg		0	0	0		0
FW	(Japan)	Ryūji Nagata	March 28, 1972 (aged 20)	178 cm / 70 kg		0	0	0		0
FW	(Japan)	Kazuhiro Ogura	May 10, 1972 (aged 20)	177 cm / 77 kg		0	0	0		0
GK	(Japan)	Daisuke Matsuyama	July 20, 1972 (aged 20)	184 cm / 68 kg		0	0	0		0
DF	(Japan)	Hideaki Mori	October 6, 1972 (aged 19)	183 cm / 73 kg		0	0	0		0
DF	(Japan)	Hiroshige Yanagimoto	October 15, 1972 (aged 19)	173 cm / 64 kg		0	0	0		0
MF	(Japan)	Ken Michiki	October 16, 1972 (aged 19)	165 cm / 63 kg		0	0	0		0
MF	(Japan)	Masato Fue	March 22, 1973 (aged 19)	174 cm / 65 kg		1	4	1		2
FW	(Japan)	Kazuo Sumata	May 1, 1973 (aged 19)	176 cm / 72 kg		0	0	0		0
FW	(Japan)	Yasumasa Makino	July 1, 1973 (aged 19)	172 cm / 65 kg		0	0	0		0
MF	(Japan)	Koji Yoshikawa	July 4, 1973 (aged 19)	170 cm / 63 kg		0	0	0		0
DF	(Japan)	Ryūji Michiki	August 25, 1973 (aged 19)	174 cm / 64 kg	0	0	5	0	5	0
GK	(England)	Lee Baxter	June 17, 1976 (aged 16)	183 cm / 74 kg		0	0	0		0
DF	(Japan)	Hiroshi Matsuda †	September 2, 1960 (aged 32)	cm / – kg		0	3	0		0
GK	(Japan)	Kazuyori Mochizuki †	November 20, 1961 (aged 30)	cm / – kg		0	0	0		0

- † player(s) joined the team after the opening of this season.

== Transfers ==
In:

No.	Pos.	Nation	Player
—	DF	JPN	Hiroshige Yanagimoto (from Mazda SC Toyo)
—	MF	JPN	Tetsuya Tanaka (from Nippon Steel Yawata)
—	MF	JPN	Masato Fue (from Mazda SC Toyo)
—	FW	TCH	Pavel Černý (from Sparta Prague)
—	GK	JPN	Daisuke Matsuyama (from Mazda SC Toyo)
—	GK	ENG	Lee Baxter
—	DF	JPN	Hideaki Mori (from Mazda SC Toyo)
—	DF	JPN	Yūichi Yoshimoto (from Mazda SC Toyo)
—	DF	JPN	Toshiaki Tsukioka (from Mazda SC Toyo)
—	DF	JPN	Ryūji Michiki (from Kunimi High School)
—	MF	JPN	Koji Yoshikawa (from Taisha High School)
—	FW	JPN	Kazuhiro Ogura (from Mazda SC Toyo)
—	FW	JPN	Yasumasa Makino (from Hamana High School)
—	FW	JPN	Kazuo Sumata (from Tsurusaki Technical High School)

Out:

No.	Pos.	Nation	Player
3	DF	JPN	Hiroshi Matsuda (retired)
4	MF	TCH	Jiří Kabyl
13	DF	JPN	Hirofumi Yamanishi (retired)
16	FW	JPN	Akihiro Kameda (to Urawa Red Diamonds)
18	MF	JPN	Shinji Kobayashi (retired)
19	FW	JPN	Takashi Kawamura (to Yokohama Flügels)

- Mazda SC Toyo is second team of Mazda SC (Sanfrecce Hiroshima).

== Transfers during the season ==
=== In ===
- (Japan) Hiroshi Matsuda (from Sanfrecce Hiroshima Coach)
- (Japan) Kazuyori Mochizuki (from Sanfrecce Hiroshima Coach)

=== Out ===
none

== Other pages ==
- (in Japanese) J. League official site
- (in Japanese) Sanfrecce Hiroshima official site
