= Yoshiro Moriyama =

Japanese footballer

Yoshiro Moriyama 森山 佳郎
Personal information
- Full name: Yoshiro Moriyama
- Date of birth: November 9, 1967 (age 59)
- Place of birth: Kumamoto, Kumamoto, Japan
- Height: 1.75 m (5 ft 9 in)
- Position: Defender

Team information
- Current team: Vegalta Sendai (manager)

Youth career
- –1979: Higashimachi Elementary School
- 1980–1982: Nishikigaoka Junior High School
- 1983–1985: Kumamoto Daini High School

College career
Years	Team	Apps	(Gls)
1987–1990	University of Tsukuba		

Senior career*
Years	Team	Apps	(Gls)
1991–1995	Sanfrecce Hiroshima	97	(4)
1996–1997	Yokohama Flügels	53	(1)
1998	Júbilo Iwata	0	(0)
1999	Bellmare Hiratsuka	18	(0)
Total		168	(5)

International career
1994	Japan	7	(0)

Managerial career
- 2002–2011: Sanfrecce Hiroshima U18
- 2012–2023: Japan U17
- 2024–: Vegalta Sendai
Medal record
Sanfrecce Hiroshima
Runner-up	J1 League	1994
Runner-up	Emperor's Cup	1995
Yokohama Flügels
Runner-up	Emperor's Cup	1997
Júbilo Iwata
Runner-up	J1 League	1998
Winner	J.League Cup	1998
- * Club domestic league appearances and goals

Yoshiro Moriyama (森山 佳郎, Moriyama Yoshiro; born November 9, 1967) is a Japanese professional football manager and former player who played a defender. He is the manager of J2 League club Vegalta Sendai. He has been the manager of a number of teams in the Japan national football team youth set up, as well as the manager of the Sanfrecce Hiroshima U18 team.

== Club career ==
Moriyama was born in Kumamoto on November 9, 1967. After graduating from the University of Tsukuba, he joined Mazda (later Sanfrecce Hiroshima) in 1991. The club finished in 2nd place in the J1 League and were runners-up in the 1995 Emperor's Cup. He moved to Yokohama Flügels in 1996, Júbilo Iwata in 1998 and Bellmare Hiratsuka in 1999. He retired at the end of the 1999 season.

== National team career ==
On July 8, 1994, Moriyama debuted for the Japan national team against Ghana. He was also selected by Japan for 1994 Asian Games and played all matches. He played 7 games for Japan in 1994.

== Managerial career ==
In November 2023, Moriyama was appointed manager of J2 League club Vegalta Sendai.

== Career statistics ==
=== Club ===
Appearances and goals by club, season and competition
Club	Season	League			Emperor's Cup		J.League Cup		Total	
Club	Season	Division	Apps	Goals	Apps	Goals	Apps	Goals	Apps	Goals
Mazda	1991–92	JSL Division 1	2	0			2	1	4	1
Sanfrecce Hiroshima	1992	J1 League	—		0	0	6	0	6	0
Sanfrecce Hiroshima	1993	J1 League	29	2	4	0	6	0	39	2
Sanfrecce Hiroshima	1994	J1 League	42	0	3	0	1	0	46	0
Sanfrecce Hiroshima	1995	J1 League	24	2	3	0	—		27	2
Yokohama Flügels	1996	J1 League	26	1	1	0	10	1	37	2
Yokohama Flügels	1997	J1 League	27	0	0	0	6	0	33	0
Júbilo Iwata	1998	J1 League	0	0	0	0	1	0	1	0
Bellmare Hiratsuka	1999	J1 League	18	0	0	0	1	0	19	0
Career total			168	5	11	0	33	2	212	7

=== International ===
Japan national team
Year	Apps	Goals
1994	7	0
Total	7	0
