= Ryota Nishimura =

Japanese football manager

Ryota Nishimura (Japanese: 西村亮太) is a Japanese-Mexican football manager who was most recently the assistant manager of the Mexico national football team.

== Early life and education ==
Nishimura was born in 1985 in Osaka, Japan. He attended Otsuka High School. Nishimura attended Tsubasa University.

== Career ==
In 2012, Nishimura arrived in Mexico, where he attended ENDIT with Mexican manager Jaime Lozano.

== Personal life ==
Nishimura cited Japanese manager Yahiro Kazama as a managerial influence.
