= Kazumasa Kawano =

Japanese footballer

Kazumasa Kawano 河野 和正
Personal information
- Full name: Kazumasa Kawano
- Date of birth: 7 November 1970 (age 55)
- Place of birth: Oita, Japan
- Height: 1.86 m (6 ft 1 in)
- Position: Goalkeeper

Youth career
- 1986–1988: Nakatsu Technical High School

Senior career*
| Years | Team | Apps | (Gls) |
| 1989–1996 | Sanfrecce Hiroshima | 59 | (0) |
| 1997–1998 | Nagoya Grampus Eight | 6 | (0) |
| 1997 | → Yokohama Marinos (loan) | 10 | (0) |
| 1999–2002 | Cerezo Osaka | 25 | (0) |
| Total | | 100 | (0) |
Medal record
Sanfrecce Hiroshima
| Runner-up | J1 League | 1994 |
| Runner-up | Emperor's Cup | 1995 |
| Runner-up | Emperor's Cup | 1996 |
Cerezo Osaka
| Runner-up | Emperor's Cup | 2001 |
- * Club domestic league appearances and goals

Kazumasa Kawano (河野 和正, Kawano Kazumasa; born 7 November 1970) is a former Japanese football player. He is the current goalkeeper coach for the J1 League club of Nagoya Grampus.

== Playing career ==
Kawano was born in Oita Prefecture on 7 November 1970. After graduating from high school, he joined Mazda (later Sanfrecce Hiroshima) in 1989. He was mainly a reserve goalkeeper behind Kazuya Maekawa. However, from 1992, he played many matches because Maekawa was prone to injuries. In 1995, the club won 2nd place in the J1 League. In 1997, he moved to Nagoya Grampus Eight. In September 1997, he moved to Yokohama Marinos on loan. He played many matches instead Japan national team player Yoshikatsu Kawaguchi while left the club for 1998 World Cup qualification. After he returned to Grampus Eight in 1998, he moved to Cerezo Osaka in 1999. He battles with Seigo Shimokawa for the position and he played many matches from 2001. However, the club was relegated to J2 League in 2001. In 2002, he played many matches and the club won the 2nd place in the J2 League. Although the club was promoted to the J1 League from 2003, he retired at the end of the 2002 season.

== Coaching career ==
After retirement, Kawano started a coaching career at Cerezo Osaka in 2003. He mainly served as goalkeeper coach for the youth team until 2013. In 2014, he became a coach for the top team.

== Club statistics ==
| Club performance | | | League | | Cup | | League Cup | | Total | |
| Season | Club | League | Apps | Goals | Apps | Goals | Apps | Goals | Apps | Goals |
| Japan | | | League | | Emperor's Cup | | J.League Cup | | Total | |
|---|---|---|---|---|---|---|---|---|---|---|
| 1989/90 | Mazda | JSL Division 2 | 0 | 0 | 0 | 0 | 0 | 0 | 0 | 0 |
| 1990/91 | Mazda | JSL Division 2 | 0 | 0 | 0 | 0 | 0 | 0 | 0 | 0 |
| 1991/92 | Mazda | JSL Division 1 | 0 | 0 | 0 | 0 | 0 | 0 | 0 | 0 |
| 1992 | Sanfrecce Hiroshima | J1 League | - | | 2 | 0 | 8 | 0 | 10 | 0 |
| 1993 | Sanfrecce Hiroshima | J1 League | 21 | 0 | 4 | 0 | 6 | 0 | 31 | 0 |
| 1994 | Sanfrecce Hiroshima | J1 League | 17 | 0 | 3 | 0 | 1 | 0 | 21 | 0 |
| 1995 | Sanfrecce Hiroshima | J1 League | 15 | 0 | 0 | 0 | - | | 15 | 0 |
| 1996 | Sanfrecce Hiroshima | J1 League | 4 | 0 | 0 | 0 | 0 | 0 | 4 | 0 |
| 1997 | Nagoya Grampus Eight | J1 League | 0 | 0 | 0 | 0 | 0 | 0 | 0 | 0 |
| 1997 | Yokohama Marinos | J1 League | 10 | 0 | 0 | 0 | 0 | 0 | 10 | 0 |
| 1998 | Nagoya Grampus Eight | J1 League | 6 | 0 | 3 | 0 | 0 | 0 | 9 | 0 |
| 1999 | Cerezo Osaka | J1 League | 0 | 0 | 3 | 0 | 2 | 0 | 5 | 0 |
| 2000 | Cerezo Osaka | J1 League | 0 | 0 | 2 | 0 | 1 | 0 | 3 | 0 |
| 2001 | Cerezo Osaka | J1 League | 12 | 0 | 0 | 0 | 2 | 0 | 14 | 0 |
| 2002 | Cerezo Osaka | J2 League | 13 | 0 | 0 | 0 | - | | 13 | 0 |
| Total | | | 98 | 0 | 14 | 0 | 20 | 0 | 132 | 0 |
