= Akinobu Yokouchi =

Japanese footballer (born 1967)

Akinobu Yokouchi 横内 昭展
Personal information
- Full name: Akinobu Yokouchi
- Date of birth: 30 November 1967 (age 58)
- Place of birth: Fukuoka, Japan
- Height: 1.74 m (5 ft 9 in)
- Position: Midfielder

Team information
- Current team: Montedio Yamagata (head coach)

Youth career
- 1983–1985: Tokai University Daigo High School

Senior career*
Years	Team	Apps	(Gls)
1986–1995	Sanfrecce Hiroshima		

Managerial career
- 2017: Sanfrecce Hiroshima (caretaker)
- 2023–2024: Júbilo Iwata
- 2025–: Montedio Yamagata
Medal record
Sanfrecce Hiroshima
Runner-up	J1 League	1994
Runner-up	Emperor's Cup	1987
Runner-up	Emperor's Cup	1995
- * Club domestic league appearances and goals

Akinobu Yokouchi (横内 昭展, Yokouchi Akinobu; born November 30, 1967) is a Japanese football manager and former football player. He is the currently manager of J2 League club Montedio Yamagata.

== Playing career ==
Yokouchi was born in Fukuoka Prefecture on November 30, 1967. After graduating from high school, he joined Japan Soccer League club Mazda (later Sanfrecce Hiroshima) in 1986. He played many matches as offensive midfielder. In 1992, the Japan Soccer League folded and the new J1 League was founded. However he did not play in many matches due to an injury and retired at the end of the 1995 season.

== Managerial career ==
After retiring, Yokouchi began his coaching career with Sanfrecce Hiroshima in 1996, primarily working with the youth team until 2002. In 2003, he transitioned to coaching the top team. The club achieved championship victories in 2012, 2013, and 2015 J1 League. However, in 2017, the club struggled with poor results, leading to the dismissal of manager Hajime Moriyasu in July. Yokouchi served as caretaker manager for one match during this period.

On 25 December 2022, Yokouchi was appointed as the manager of J2 relegation club Jubilo Iwata for the upcoming 2023 season. On 12 November 2023, Yokouchi led his team to promotion to the J1 League for the 2024 season after securing a 1–2 away victory against Tochigi SC on the final day.

On June 25 Yokouchi was appointed as manager of Montedio Yamagata.

== Career statistics ==
=== Club ===
Club performance			League		Cup		League Cup		Total	
Season	Club	League	Apps	Goals	Apps	Goals	Apps	Goals	Apps	Goals
Japan			League		Emperor's Cup		J.League Cup		Total	
1986/87	Mazda	JSL Division 1	0	0					0	0
1987/88	Mazda	JSL Division 1	0	0					0	0
1988/89	Mazda	JSL Division 2								
1989/90	Mazda	JSL Division 2	13	1			2	1	15	2
1990/91	Mazda	JSL Division 2	29	5			2	0	31	5
1991/92	Mazda	JSL Division 1	22	2			4	0	26	2
1992	Sanfrecce Hiroshima	J1 League	-		0	0	4	0	4	0
1993	Sanfrecce Hiroshima	J1 League	2	0	2	0	5	1	9	1
1994	Sanfrecce Hiroshima	J1 League	0	0	3	0	0	0	3	0
1995	Sanfrecce Hiroshima	J1 League	2	0	0	0	-		2	0
Total			68	8	5	0	17	2	90	10

== Managerial statistics ==
As of the end 2024 season. League matches only

Team	From	To	Record				
Team	From	To	G	W	D	L	Win %
Sanfrecce Hiroshima	2017		1	0	1	0	0.00
Júbilo Iwata	2023	2024	80	31	20	29	38.75
Montedio Yamagata	2025	present	0	0	0	0	—
Total			81	31	21	29	38.27

== Honours ==
=== Manager ===
Júbilo Iwata

- Promotion to J1 League 2024
