= Takumi Shima =

Japanese footballer

Takumi Shima 島 卓視
Personal information
- Full name: Takumi Shima
- Date of birth: 3 October 1967 (age 59)
- Place of birth: Tokushima, Japan
- Height: 1.70 m (5 ft 7 in)
- Position: Forward

Youth career
- 1983–1985: Tokushima Commercial High School

Senior career*
| Years | Team | Apps | (Gls) |
| 1986–1995 | Sanfrecce Hiroshima | | |
Medal record
Sanfrecce Hiroshima
| Runner-up | J1 League | 1994 |
| Runner-up | Emperor's Cup | 1987 |
| Runner-up | Emperor's Cup | 1995 |
- * Club domestic league appearances and goals

Takumi Shima (島 卓視, Shima Takumi; born 3 October 1967) is a former Japanese football player.

== Playing career ==
Shima was born in Tokushima Prefecture on 3 October 1967. After graduating from high school, he joined Japan Soccer League club Mazda (later Sanfrecce Hiroshima) in 1986. He played many matches as forward and the club won the 2nd place 1987 Emperor's Cup. In 1992, Japan Soccer League was folded and founded new league J1 League. The club won the 2nd place 1994 J1 League. However he could not play at all in the match for injury in 1995 and retired end of 1995 season.

== Club statistics ==
| Club performance | | | League | | Cup | | League Cup | | Total | |
| Season | Club | League | Apps | Goals | Apps | Goals | Apps | Goals | Apps | Goals |
| Japan | | | League | | Emperor's Cup | | J.League Cup | | Total | |
|---|---|---|---|---|---|---|---|---|---|---|
| 1986/87 | Mazda | JSL Division 1 | | | | | | | | |
| 1987/88 | Mazda | JSL Division 1 | | | | | | | | |
| 1988/89 | Mazda | JSL Division 2 | | | | | | | | |
| 1989/90 | Mazda | JSL Division 2 | 22 | 4 | | | 2 | 0 | 24 | 4 |
| 1990/91 | Mazda | JSL Division 2 | 18 | 9 | | | 3 | 0 | 21 | 9 |
| 1991/92 | Mazda | JSL Division 1 | 15 | 4 | | | 0 | 0 | 15 | 4 |
| 1992 | Sanfrecce Hiroshima | J1 League | - | | 3 | 0 | 8 | 1 | 11 | 1 |
| 1993 | Sanfrecce Hiroshima | J1 League | 9 | 4 | 4 | 1 | 6 | 1 | 19 | 6 |
| 1994 | Sanfrecce Hiroshima | J1 League | 28 | 3 | 2 | 0 | 1 | 0 | 31 | 3 |
| 1995 | Sanfrecce Hiroshima | J1 League | 0 | 0 | 0 | 0 | - | | 0 | 0 |
| Total | | | 92 | 24 | 9 | 1 | 20 | 2 | 121 | 27 |
