= Shinichiro Takahashi =

Japanese footballer and manager

Shinichiro Takahashi 高橋 真一郎
Personal information
- Full name: Shinichiro Takahashi
- Date of birth: October 27, 1957 (age 69)
- Place of birth: Fukuyama, Hiroshima, Japan
- Height: 1.71 m (5 ft 7 in)
- Position: Forward

Youth career
- 1973–1975: Matsunaga High School
- 1976–1979: Osaka University of Economics

Senior career*
Years	Team	Apps	(Gls)
1980–1993	Sanfrecce Hiroshima	203	(46)
Total		203	(46)

Managerial career
- 2009: Kashiwa Reysol
- 2012: Tokyo Verdy
Medal record
Sanfrecce Hiroshima
Runner-up	Emperor's Cup	1987
- * Club domestic league appearances and goals

Shinichiro Takahashi (高橋 真一郎, Takahashi Shin'ichirō; born October 27, 1957) is a former Japanese football player and manager.

== Playing career ==
Takahashi was born in Fukuyama on October 27, 1957. After graduating from Osaka University of Economics, he joined his local club Toyo Industries (later Mazda, Sanfrecce Hiroshima) in 1980. He played regular player as forward and offensive midfielder. Although the club results were bad in Japan Soccer League, won the 2nd place 1987 Emperor's Cup. In 1992, Japan Soccer League was folded and founded new league J1 League. However he could hardly play in the match for injury and retired end of 1993 season.

== Coaching career ==
After retirement, Takahashi started coaching career at Sanfrecce Hiroshima in 1994. In 2000, he moved to Gamba Osaka and became a manager for youth team. In 2003, he returned to Sanfrecce. In 2004, he moved to Yokohama F. Marinos. He served as manager for youth team (2004–06) and coach for top team (2007). In 2008, he moved to Kashiwa Reysol. He served as coach in 2008 and manager in 2009. However the club results were bad in 2009 and he was sacked in July. In 2010, he returned to Sanfrecce again. In 2012, he moved to Tokyo Verdy and became a coach. In September, manager Ryoichi Kawakatsu resigned and Takahashi became new manager as Kawakatsu successor. He resigned end of 2012 season.

== Career statistics ==
Appearances and goals by club, season and competition
Club	Season	League			Emperor's Cup		J.League Cup		Total	
Club	Season	Division	Apps	Goals	Apps	Goals	Apps	Goals	Apps	Goals
Toyo Industries	1980	JSL Division 1	9	3					9	3
Mazda	1981	JSL Division 1	3	0					3	0
Mazda	1982	JSL Division 1	8	0					8	0
Mazda	1983	JSL Division 1	10	2					10	2
Mazda	1984	JSL Division 2	18	3					18	3
Mazda	1985–86	JSL Division 2	16	9					16	9
Mazda	1986–87	JSL Division 1	21	7					21	7
Mazda	1987–88	JSL Division 1	11	1			1	0	12	1
Mazda	1988–89	JSL Division 2	26	9			3	0	29	9
Mazda	1989–90	JSL Division 2	30	3			2	0	32	3
Mazda	1990–91	JSL Division 2	26	3			3	1	29	4
Mazda	1991–92	JSL Division 1	22	6			4	0	26	6
Sanfrecce Hiroshima	1992	J1 League	—		2	0	3	0	5	0
Sanfrecce Hiroshima	1993	J1 League	3	0	0	0	3	0	6	0
Career total			203	46	2	0	19	1	224	47

== Managerial statistics ==
Team	From	To	Record				
Team	From	To	G	W	D	L	Win %
Kashiwa Reysol	2009	2009	17	3	6	8	17.65
Tokyo Verdy	2012	2012	10	3	4	3	30.00
Total			27	6	10	11	22.22
