= John van Loen =

Dutch footballer

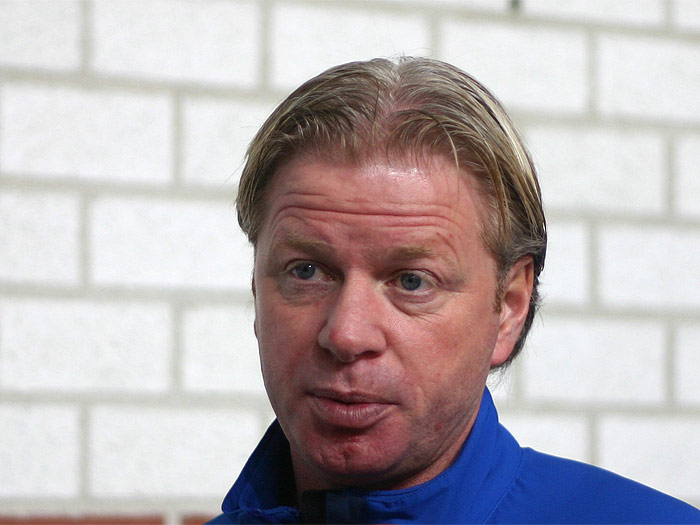

Personal information
- Full name: Johannes Maria van Loen
- Date of birth: 4 February 1965 (age 61)
- Place of birth: Utrecht, Netherlands
- Height: 1.92 m (6 ft 4 in)
- Position: Forward

Youth career
- UVV Utrecht

Senior career*
Years	Team	Apps	(Gls)
1983–1988	Utrecht	116	(44)
1988–1990	Roda JC	56	(25)
1990–1991	Anderlecht	25	(3)
1991–1993	Ajax	37	(11)
1993–1995	Feyenoord	54	(17)
1995	Sanfrecce Hiroshima	36	(9)
1996–1998	Utrecht	50	(7)
1998	APOEL	0	(0)
Total		374	(116)

International career
1985–1990	Netherlands	7	(1)

Managerial career
- 1998–2002: Utrecht (youth coach)
- 2002–2007: Utrecht (assistant)
- 2009–2010: Roda '46
- 2011–2012: Apeldoorn
- 2012–2013: Sparta Rotterdam (assistant)
- 2013–2014: DOS '37
- 2014–2016: Qarabağ (youth coach)
- 2017–2022: VVZ '49
- 2022: Locomotive Tbilisi
- * Club domestic league appearances and goals

Johannes ("John") Maria van Loen (born 4 February 1965) is a Dutch football manager and former player who most recently managed Locomotive Tbilisi. A forward, he earned seven caps for the Netherlands national team, with which he scored one goal. He played in the 1986 FIFA World Cup Qualification and the 1990 FIFA World Cup in Italy.

== Career statistics ==
=== Club ===
Appearances and goals by club, season and competition
Club	Season	League		
Club	Season	Division	Apps	Goals
Utrecht	1983–84	Eredivisie	2	0
Utrecht	1984–85	Eredivisie	22	5
Utrecht	1985–86	Eredivisie	30	15
Utrecht	1986–87	Eredivisie	31	11
Utrecht	1987–88	Eredivisie	31	13
Utrecht	Total		114	44
Roda	1988–89	Eredivisie	31	8
Roda	1989–90	Eredivisie	25	17
Roda	Total		56	25
Anderlecht	1990–91	First Division	26	3
Ajax	1991–92	Eredivisie	30	10
Ajax	1992–93	Eredivisie	7	1
Ajax	Total		37	11
Feyenoord Rotterdam	1992–93	Eredivisie	16	4
Feyenoord Rotterdam	1993–94	Eredivisie	23	9
Feyenoord Rotterdam	1994–95	Eredivisie	15	4
Feyenoord Rotterdam	Total		54	17
Sanfrecce Hiroshima	1995	J1 League	36	9
Utrecht	1995–96	Eredivisie	14	1
Utrecht	1996–97	Eredivisie	25	6
Utrecht	1997–98	Eredivisie	12	0
Utrecht	Total		51	7
APOEL Nicosia	1998–99	First Division	0	0
Career total			374	116

=== International ===
Appearances and goals by national team and year
National team	Year	Apps	Goals
Netherlands	1985	1	0
Netherlands	1986	0	0
Netherlands	1987	0	0
Netherlands	1988	1	0
Netherlands	1989	3	1
Netherlands	1990	2	0
Total		7	1

Scores and results list the Netherlands' goal tally first, score column indicates score after each Van Loen goal.

List of international goals scored by John van Loen
No.	Date	Venue	Opponent	Score	Result	Competition
1	4 January 1989	Ramat Gan Stadium, Tel Aviv, Israel	Israel	2–0	2–0	Friendly

== Honours ==
Utrecht

- KNVB Cup: 1984–85

Anderlecht

- Belgian First Division: 1990–91

Ajax

- UEFA Cup: 1991-92

Feyenoord

- Eredivisie: 1992-93
- KNVB Cup: 1993–94
- Dutch Super Cup (in 1996 rebranded as Johan Cruyff Shield): runner-up 1993, 1994
