= Kazuyori Mochizuki =

Japanese footballer and manager

Kazuyori Mochizuki 望月 一頼
Personal information
- Full name: Kazuyori Mochizuki
- Date of birth: November 20, 1961 (age 64)
- Place of birth: Shizuoka, Japan
- Height: 1.86 m (6 ft 1 in)
- Position: Goalkeeper

Youth career
- 1977–1979: Shimizu Higashi High School

College career
Years	Team	Apps	(Gls)
1980–1983	University of Tsukuba		

Senior career*
Years	Team	Apps	(Gls)
1984–1988	Mazda	0	(0)
1992–1994	Sanfrecce Hiroshima	0	(0)
Total		0	(0)

Managerial career
- 2006: Sanfrecce Hiroshima
Medal record
Sanfrecce Hiroshima
Runner-up	J1 League	1994
Runner-up	Emperor's Cup	1987
- * Club domestic league appearances and goals

Kazuyori Mochizuki (望月 一頼, Mochizuki Kazuyori; born November 20, 1961) is a Japanese manager and former footballer.

== Playing career ==
Mochizuki was born in Shizuoka on November 20, 1961. After graduating from the University of Tsukuba, he joined Japan Soccer League club Mazda (later Sanfrecce Hiroshima) in 1984. He was mainly used as a back-up and did not make any appearances, before retiring in 1988. After retirement, he became a coach at Mazda. In 1992, the Japan Soccer League was folded and founded a new league, the J1 League. He came out of retirement because the club, now known as Sanfrecce Hiroshima, had an injury crisis. Once again, he did not make any appearances and retired at the end of the 1994 season.

== Coaching career ==
After retirement, Mochizuki started his coaching career at Mazda (later Sanfrecce Hiroshima) in 1988. He mainly served as the goalkeeper coach. In November 1998, he became the goalkeeper coach for the Japan national team under manager Philippe Troussier. He also coached the Japan U-20 national team at the 1999 World Youth Championship and the Japan U-23 national team at the 2000 Summer Olympics. At 1999 World Youth Championship, Japan were runners-up. In October 2000, the Japan national team won the Asian Cup. In 2001, he returned to Sanfrecce as the new goalkeeper coach. In April 2006, Takeshi Ono was sacked and Mochizuki succeeded Ono as manager. He managed the club in 4 matches until June, where the club signed appointed Mihailo Petrović and Mochizuki returned to his previous position as goalkeeper coach until 2011. He became a director for the youth team in 2012 and went on manage the youth team from 2013 to 2014.

== Club statistics ==
Club performance			League		Cup		League Cup		Total	
Season	Club	League	Apps	Goals	Apps	Goals	Apps	Goals	Apps	Goals
Japan			League		Emperor's Cup		J.League Cup		Total	
1984	Mazda	JSL Division 2	0	0	0	0	0	0	0	0
1985/86	Mazda	JSL Division 2	0	0	0	0	0	0	0	0
1986/87	Mazda	JSL Division 1	0	0	0	0	0	0	0	0
1987/88	Mazda	JSL Division 1	0	0	0	0	0	0	0	0
1992	Sanfrecce Hiroshima	J1 League	-		0	0	0	0	0	0
1993	Sanfrecce Hiroshima	J1 League	0	0	0	0	0	0	0	0
1994	Sanfrecce Hiroshima	J1 League	0	0	0	0	0	0	0	0
Total			0	0	0	0	0	0	0	0

== Managerial statistics ==
Team	From	To	Record				
Team	From	To	G	W	D	L	Win %
Sanfrecce Hiroshima	2006	2006	4	2	1	1	50.00
Total			4	2	1	1	50.00
