= Nobuhiro Ueno =

Japanese footballer and manager

Nobuhiro Ueno 上野 展裕
Personal information
- Full name: Nobuhiro Ueno
- Date of birth: 26 August 1965 (age 61)
- Place of birth: Koka, Shiga, Japan
- Height: 1.75 m (5 ft 9 in)
- Position: Defender

Team information
- Current team: Becamex Ho Chi Minh City (head coach)

Youth career
- 1981–1983: Zeze High School
- 1984–1987: Waseda University

Senior career*
Years	Team	Apps	(Gls)
1988–1991	All Nippon Airways	10	(1)
1991–1994	Sanfrecce Hiroshima	18	(1)
Total		28	(2)

Managerial career
- 2004: Japan U-20
- 2009–2011: Zweigen Kanazawa
- 2012: Albirex Niigata (caretaker)
- 2014–2017: Renofa Yamaguchi
- 2018: Ventforet Kofu
- 2021: Kagoshima United
- 2023–2024: Fukuyama City FC
- 2024–2025: Truong Tuoi Binh Phuoc (fitness coach)
- 2025: Becamex Ho Chi Minh City (assistant)
- 2026–: Becamex Ho Chi Minh City
Medal record
All Nippon Airways
Runner-up	Japan Soccer League	1988/89
Sanfrecce Hiroshima
Runner-up	J1 League	1994
- * Club domestic league appearances and goals

Nobuhiro Ueno (上野 展裕, Ueno Nobuhiro; born August 26, 1965) is a Japanese football manager and former player, who is the head coach of V.League 1 club Becamex Ho Chi Minh City.

== Club career ==
Ueno was born in Koka on August 26, 1965. After graduating from Waseda University, he joined All Nippon Airways in 1988. Although he debuted in February 1990, he could not play many matches. In 1991, he moved to Mazda (later Sanfrecce Hiroshima). He played many matches as center back and defensive midfielder. However he could not play at all in the match from 1993 and he retired end of 1994 season.

== International career ==
In 1988, Ueno was selected Japan national "B team" for 1988 Asian Cup. But he did not play in the match.

== Managerial career ==
After retirement, Ueno started coaching career at Sanfrecce Hiroshima in 1995. He mainly served as coach for top team and manager for youth team until 2003. In 2004, he became a manager for Japan U-20 national team. In 2005, he signed with Kyoto Purple Sanga (later Kyoto Sanga FC) and served mainly coach for top team until 2008. In 2009, he moved to Regional Leagues club Zweigen Kanazawa. The club was promoted to Japan Football League (JFL) in 2010. he managed the club until 2011. In 2012, he signed with Albirex Niigata and managed youth team until 2013. In May 2012, top team manager Hisashi Kurosaki was sacked and Ueno managed top team as caretaker until June when the club signed with new manager Masaaki Yanagishita.

In 2014, he signed with JFL club Renofa Yamaguchi. In 2014, the club won the 4th place and was promoted to J3 League. In 2015, the club won the champions and was promoted to J2 League. However, as the club produced underwhelming performances throughout his time in charge of the club at the 2017 season, he was sacked in May, when the club was the antepenultimate-placed team at the J3.

In May 2018, he signed with J2 club Ventforet Kofu. He resigned at the end of 2018 season.

In July 2021, Ueno was appointed as manager of Kagoshima United mid-season. On 4 December of the same year, he left the club after half a season with Kagoshima.

On 5 January 2023, Ueno was appointed as the new Fukuyama City FC manager for the 2023 season of the Chūgoku Soccer League.

In September 2024, Ueno moved to Vietnam, being appointed as the fitness coach and tactical advisor of V.League 2 club Truong Tuoi Binh Phuoc.

== Career statistics ==
=== Club ===
As of the end of 1994 season.

Club performance			League		Cup		League Cup		Total	
Season	Club	League	Apps	Goals	Apps	Goals	Apps	Goals	Apps	Goals
Japan			League		Emperor's Cup		J.League Cup		Total	
1988/89	All Nippon Airways	JSL Division 1	0	0					0	0
1989/90	All Nippon Airways	JSL Division 1	4	1			0	0	4	1
1990/91	All Nippon Airways	JSL Division 1	6	0			0	0	6	0
1991/92	Mazda	JSL Division 1	18	1			1	0	19	1
1992	Sanfrecce Hiroshima	J1 League	-		1	0	8	0	9	0
1993	Sanfrecce Hiroshima	J1 League	0	0	0	0	0	0	0	0
1994	Sanfrecce Hiroshima	J1 League	0	0	0	0	0	0	0	0
Total			28	2	1	0	9	0	38	2

== Managerial statistics ==
As of 9 April 2023.

Team	From	To	Record				
Team	From	To	G	W	D	L	Win %
Zweigen Kanazawa	2009	2011	81	37	17	27	45.68
Albirex Niigata	2012		1	0	0	1	0.00
Renofa Yamaguchi	2014	2017	119	57	21	41	47.90
Ventforet Kofu	2018		31	14	6	11	45.16
Veertien Mie	2019	2021	57	19	16	22	33.33
Kagoshima United	2021		15	6	4	5	40.00
Fukuyama City FC	2023	present	2	2	0	0	100.00
Total			306	135	64	107	44.12

== Honours ==
=== Manager ===
Renofa Yamaguchi

- J3 League: 2015
