= Hiroshi Matsuda =

Japanese footballer and manager

Hiroshi Matsuda 松田 浩
Personal information
- Full name: Hiroshi Matsuda
- Date of birth: 2 September 1960 (age 66)
- Place of birth: Nagasaki, Japan
- Height: 1.81 m (5 ft 11 in)
- Position: Defender

Youth career
- Nagasaki Kita High School

College career
Years	Team	Apps	(Gls)
- University of Tsukuba

Senior career*
Years	Team	Apps	(Gls)
1984–1994	Sanfrecce Hiroshima		
1995–1996	Vissel Kobe	38	(2)

Managerial career
- 2002: Vissel Kobe
- 2003–2006: Avispa Fukuoka
- 2006–2008: Vissel Kobe
- 2009–2013: Tochigi SC
- 2021–2022: V-Varen Nagasaki
- 2022: Gamba Osaka
- 2023: Tegevajaro Miyazaki
Medal record
Sanfrecce Hiroshima
Runner-up	J1 League	1994
Runner-up	Emperor's Cup	1987
- * Club domestic league appearances and goals

Hiroshi Matsuda (松田 浩, Matsuda Hiroshi; born September 2, 1960) is a Japanese manager and former footballer.

== Club career ==
Matsuda was born in Nagasaki on September 2, 1960. After graduating from University of Tsukuba, he joined Japan Soccer League club Mazda (later Sanfrecce Hiroshima) in 1984. He became a regular player as a centre back with Katsuyoshi Shinto. The club were runners-up at the 1987 Emperor's Cup. In 1992, the Japan Soccer League was folded and a new league, the J1 League, was founded instead. In 1994, although the club finished in 2nd place in the J1 League, his opportunity to play decreased. In 1995, he moved to Japan Football League club Vissel Kobe. In 1996, the club finished in 2nd place and was promoted to the J1 League, and he retired end of the season.

== Managerial career ==
After retirement, Matsuda started his coaching career at Vissel Kobe in 1997. He mainly served as a coach until 2002. In July 2002, the club results were bad and manager Ryoichi Kawakatsu was sacked. Matsuda succeeded Kawakatsu as manager. He kept the club in the J1 League and left at the end of the season. In 2003, he moved to J2 League club Avispa Fukuoka. The club finished in 2nd place in 2005 and was promoted to the J1 League. However the club results were bad in 2006 and he was sacked in May. In August 2006, he returned to Vissel and became a coach under manager Stuart Baxter. However Baxter left the club for family matters in September, Matsuda succeeded him as manager. In the 2006 season, the club finished in 3rd place and was promoted to the J1 League. He managed the club until 2008. In 2009, he moved to newly promoted J2 League club, Tochigi SC. Although the club results were bad in the first season, the club finished midtable from 2010 to 2012. Matsuda was sacked in September 2013 due to poor results.

In 4 May 2021, he joined J2 club V-Varen Nagasaki, and resigned on 12 June 2022. On 17 August, Matsuda appointment of J1 club, Gamba Osaka until the end of the season. On 7 December, Matsuda was appointed the new manager of J3 club Tegevajaro Miyazaki, replacing Yasushi Takasaki after his contract expired end of the 2022 season.

== Club statistics ==
Club performance			League		Cup		League Cup		Total	
Season	Club	League	Apps	Goals	Apps	Goals	Apps	Goals	Apps	Goals
Japan			League		Emperor's Cup		J.League Cup		Total	
1984	Mazda	JSL Division 2								
1985/86	Mazda	JSL Division 2								
1986/87	Mazda	JSL Division 1	21	0					21	0
1987/88	Mazda	JSL Division 1	22	0					22	0
1988/89	Mazda	JSL Division 2								
1989/90	Mazda	JSL Division 2	28	0			2	0	30	0
1990/91	Mazda	JSL Division 2	24	3			3	0	27	3
1991/92	Mazda	JSL Division 1	0	0			1	0	1	0
1992	Sanfrecce Hiroshima	J1 League	-				3	0	3	0
1993	Sanfrecce Hiroshima	J1 League	36	3	2	0	5	0	43	3
1994	Sanfrecce Hiroshima	J1 League	8	0	2	1	0	0	10	1
1995	Vissel Kobe	Football League	28	2	3	0	-		31	2
1996	Vissel Kobe	Football League	10	0	0	0	-		10	0
Total			177	8	7	1	14	0	198	9

== Managerial statistics ==
As of the start from 2023 season

Team	From	To	Record				
Team	From	To	G	W	D	L	Win %
Vissel Kobe	2002		20	8	2	10	40.00
Avispa Fukuoka	2003	2006	144	66	35	43	45.83
Vissel Kobe	2006	2008	82	30	24	28	36.59
Tochigi SC	2009	2013	199	64	51	84	32.16
V-Varen Nagasaki	4 May 2021	12 June 2022	55	31	11	13	56.36
Gamba Osaka	17 August 2022	31 January 2023	10	4	3	3	40.00
Tegevajaro Miyazaki	1 February 2023	present	0	0	0	0	—
Total			511	203	126	182	39.73
