= Jean-Paul Vonderburg =

Swedish footballer (born 1964)

Personal information
- Full name: Jean-Paul Vonderburg
- Date of birth: 31 July 1964 (age 62)
- Place of birth: Sweden
- Height: 1.85 m (6 ft 1 in)
- Position: Defender

Youth career
- –1975: IF Cobran
- 1976–1984: Hammarby IF

Senior career*
Years	Team	Apps	(Gls)
1985–1988	Hammarby IF	45	(2)
1989–1992	Malmö FF	64	(3)
1992	AGF Aarhus	5	(1)
1993	Sanfrecce Hiroshima	21	(1)
1995–1996	Hammarby IF	31	(3)

International career^{‡}
1990–1991	Sweden	4	(0)
- * Club domestic league appearances and goals as of 26 October 2017 ‡ National team caps and goals as of 15 June 2007

Jean-Paul Vonderburg (born 31 July 1964) is a Swedish retired football player.

== Career ==
Vonderburg debuted in 1985 for Hammarby IF in the Allsvenskan. In 1988 when the club was demoted from the first division, he moved to the reigning champions Malmö FF. In 1989, he won his only championship with the club.

In the summer of 1992 Vonderburg left Sweden and moved to the Danish first division side AGF Aarhus. After only one season he moved to Japan and Sanfrecce Hiroshima. He stayed only one season. In 1995, he returned to Hammarby IF. With the club, he rose again from the first division. After a year in the Second Division, he finished his active career in 1996.

== National team career ==
Vonderburg debuted for the national team on 14 February 1990. His debut was a 1–2 defeat against the United Arab Emirates. He remained scoreless, in a 2–2 draw against Greece on 17 April 1991, he scored an own goal.

== Club statistics ==
Club performance			League		Cup		League Cup		Total	
Season	Club	League	Apps	Goals	Apps	Goals	Apps	Goals	Apps	Goals
Denmark			League		Danish Cup		League Cup		Total	
1992/93	AGF Aarhus	Superliga	5	1					5	1
Japan			League		Emperor's Cup		J.League Cup		Total	
1993	Sanfrecce Hiroshima	J1 League	21	1	4	1	2	0	27	2
Country	Denmark		5	1					5	1
Country	Japan		21	1	4	1	2	0	27	2
Total			26	2	4	1	2	0	32	3

== National team statistics ==
Sweden national team
Year	Apps	Goals
1990	2	0
1991	2	0
Total	4	0
