= Yahiro Kazama =

Japanese footballer and manager

Yahiro Kazama 風間 八宏
Personal information
- Full name: Yahiro Kazama
- Date of birth: 16 October 1961 (age 65)
- Place of birth: Shizuoka, Shizuoka, Japan
- Height: 1.73 m (5 ft 8 in)
- Position: Midfielder

Team information
- Current team: Nankatsu SC (manager)

Youth career
- 1977–1979: Shimizu Shogyo High School

College career
Years	Team	Apps	(Gls)
1980–1983	University of Tsukuba		

Senior career*
Years	Team	Apps	(Gls)
1984–1985	Bayer Leverkusen II		
1985–1988	Remscheid		
1988–1989	Eintracht Braunschweig	15	(0)
1989–1995	Sanfrecce Hiroshima	166	(13)
1996–1997	Remscheid		

International career
1979	Japan U-20	3	(0)
1980–1983	Japan	19	(0)

Managerial career
- 1998–2003: Toin University of Yokohama
- 2008–2012: University of Tsukuba
- 2012–2016: Kawasaki Frontale
- 2017–2019: Nagoya Grampus
- 2024–: Nankatsu SC
Medal record
Sanfrecce Hiroshima
Runner-up	J1 League	1994
Runner-up	Emperor's Cup	1995
- * Club domestic league appearances and goals

Yahiro Kazama (風間 八宏, Kazama Yahiro; born October 16, 1961) is a Japanese manager and former footballer. He currently manager of Nankatsu SC. He played for the Japan national team until 1983. He is the first Japanese player to score in the J1 League. His two sons Koki Kazama and Koya Kazama are also footballers.

== Club career ==
Kazama was born in Shizuoka on October 16, 1961. After graduating from University of Tsukuba, he moved to Germany in 1984. He played for several clubs, including Remscheid and Eintracht Braunschweig. In 1989, he returned to Japan and joined Japan Soccer League Division 2 club Mazda (later Sanfrecce Hiroshima). The club was promoted to Division 1 in 1991. In 1992, the Japan Soccer League was folded and a new league, the J1 League, was founded. In the league's first season, he played in the opening match and scored a goal, which is the first goal by a Japanese player in the J1 League. He left Sanfrecce Hiroshima at the end of the 1995 season and returned to Remscheid again. He retired in 1998.

== National team career ==
In August 1979, when Kazama was a Shimizu Commercial High School student, he was selected by the Japan U-20 national team for 1979 World Youth Championship and he played 3 games. In December 1980, when he was a University of Tsukuba student, he was selected by the Japan national team for 1982 World Cup qualification. At this qualification, on December 22, he debuted against Singapore. He also played in the 1982 Asian Games and the 1984 Summer Olympics qualification. He played 19 games for Japan until 1983. After he moved to Germany in 1984, he was not selected to play for Japan.

== Managerial career ==
After retirement, Kazama became a manager for the Toin University of Yokohama in 1998. He resigned in 2003. In 2008, he became a manager for his alma mater University of Tsukuba and managed until April 2012.

On 23 April 2012, Kawasaki Frontale announced Kazama as their new manager. He succeeded Naoki Soma who was fired for poor results. Kazama led the club to 3rd place twice (2013 and 2016) and were runners-up of the 2016 Emperor's Cup. He resigned at the end of the 2016 season.

On 4 January 2017, Kazama moved to J2 relegated club, Nagoya Grampus for 2017 season. He led the club to a 3rd place finish at the end of season and hence gained promotion to 2018 J1 League. In the 2018 season, although Grampus results were bad, Grampus finished at the 15th place and remained in J1. On 23 September 2019, it was announced Kazama would be leaving Grampus after an underwhelming season.

On 7 November 2023, Kazama was announce official appointment manager of Kantō Soccer League club, Nankatsu SC from 2024 season.

== Club statistics ==
Club performance			League		Cup		League Cup		Total	
Season	Club	League	Apps	Goals	Apps	Goals	Apps	Goals	Apps	Goals
Japan			League		Emperor's Cup		J.League Cup		Total	
1989/90	Mazda	JSL Division 2	27	3			1	0	28	3
1990/91	Mazda	JSL Division 2	21	4			3	0	24	4
1991/92	Mazda	JSL Division 1	15	0			4	0	19	0
1992	Sanfrecce Hiroshima	J1 League	–		1	0	6	0	7	0
1993	Sanfrecce Hiroshima	J1 League	35	6	4	0	0	0	39	6
1994	Sanfrecce Hiroshima	J1 League	43	0	3	0	1	0	47	0
1995	Sanfrecce Hiroshima	J1 League	25	0	1	0	-		26	0
Total			166	13	9	0	15	0	190	13

== National team statistics ==
Japan national team
Year	Apps	Goals
1980	4	0
1981	8	0
1982	4	0
1983	3	0
Total	19	0

== Managerial statistics ==
As of the start for 2025 season.

Team	From	To	Record				
Team	From	To	G	W	D	L	Win %
Kawasaki Frontale	2012	2016	163	84	32	47	51.53
Nagoya Grampus	2017	2019	102	43	18	41	42.16
Nankatsu SC	2024	present	18	6	4	8	33.33
Total			283	133	54	96	47.00
