= Tetsuya Tanaka (footballer) =

Japanese footballer

Tetsuya Tanaka 田中 哲也
Personal information
- Full name: Tetsuya Tanaka
- Date of birth: July 27, 1971 (age 55)
- Place of birth: Nagasaki, Japan
- Height: 1.76 m (5 ft 9 1/2 in)
- Position: Midfielder

Youth career
- 1987–1989: Kunimi High School

Senior career*
Years	Team	Apps	(Gls)
1990–1991	Nippon Steel Yawata		
1992–1994	Sanfrecce Hiroshima	15	(1)
1995	Vissel Kobe	15	(0)
1996–1998	Sagan Tosu	67	(7)
Total		97	(8)
Medal record
Sanfrecce Hiroshima
Runner-up	J1 League	1994
- * Club domestic league appearances and goals

Tetsuya Tanaka (田中 哲也, Tanaka Tetsuya; born July 27, 1971) is a former Japanese football player.

== Playing career ==
Tanaka was born in Nagasaki Prefecture on July 27, 1971. After graduating from high school, he joined Nippon Steel (later Nippon Steel Yawata) in 1990. Although he played as regular player from first season, the club finished at bottom place and was relegated to Regional Leagues. In 1992, he moved to Sanfrecce Hiroshima. Although he played all matches in 1992 J.League Cup, his opportunity to play decreased from 1993. He could not play at all in the match in 1994 and he moved to Japan Football League (JFL) club Vissel Kobe in 1995. In 1996, he moved to JFL club Tosu Futures (later Sagan Tosu). He played all matches until 1997. However his opportunity to play decreased for injury in 1998 and he retired end of 1998 season.

== Club statistics ==
Club performance			League		Cup		League Cup		Total	
Season	Club	League	Apps	Goals	Apps	Goals	Apps	Goals	Apps	Goals
Japan			League		Emperor's Cup		J.League Cup		Total	
1990/91	Nippon Steel	JSL Division 2	27	1			1	0	28	1
1991	Nippon Steel Yawata	Regional Leagues								
1992	Sanfrecce Hiroshima	J1 League	–		0	0	9	3	9	3
1993	Sanfrecce Hiroshima	J1 League	15	1	1	0	3	0	19	1
1994	Sanfrecce Hiroshima	J1 League	0	0	0	0	0	0	0	0
1995	Vissel Kobe	Football League	15	0	1	0	–		16	0
1996	Tosu Futures	Football League	30	2	3	3	–		33	5
1997	Sagan Tosu	Football League	30	4	3	0	5	0	38	4
1998	Sagan Tosu	Football League	7	1	0	0	–		7	1
Total			124	9	8	3	18	3	150	15
