= Yasutaka Yoshida =

Japanese footballer

Yasutaka Yoshida 吉田 安孝
Personal information
- Full name: Yasutaka Yoshida
- Date of birth: November 22, 1966 (age 59)
- Place of birth: Hiroshima, Japan
- Height: 1.80 m (5 ft 11 in)
- Position: Defender

Youth career
- 1982–1984: Hiroshima Kokutaiji High School
- 1985–1988: Tokai University

Senior career*
Years	Team	Apps	(Gls)
1989–1991	Tanabe Pharmaceutical	47	(7)
1991–1994	Sanfrecce Hiroshima	6	(0)
1995–1996	Cosmo Oil Yokkaichi	54	(1)
Total		107	(8)
Medal record
Sanfrecce Hiroshima
Runner-up	J1 League	1994
- * Club domestic league appearances and goals

Yasutaka Yoshida (吉田 安孝, Yoshida Yasutaka; born November 22, 1966) is a former Japanese football player.

== Playing career ==
Yoshida was born in Hiroshima Prefecture on November 22, 1966. After graduating from Tokai University, he joined Tanabe Pharmaceutical in 1989. He played many matches as defender from first season. In 1991, he moved to his local club Mazda (later Sanfrecce Hiroshima). However he could not play many matches and he moved to Japan Football League club Cosmo Oil (later Cosmo Oil Yokkaichi) in 1995. Although he played as regular player, the club was disbanded end of 1996 season and he retired end of 1996 season.

== Club statistics ==
Club performance			League		Cup		League Cup		Total	
Season	Club	League	Apps	Goals	Apps	Goals	Apps	Goals	Apps	Goals
Japan			League		Emperor's Cup		J.League Cup		Total	
1989/90	Tanabe Pharmaceutical	JSL Division 2	23	6			1	0	24	6
1990/91	Tanabe Pharmaceutical	JSL Division 2	24	1			1	0	25	1
1991/92	Mazda	JSL Division 1	4	0			4	0	8	0
1992	Sanfrecce Hiroshima	J1 League	-		0	0	3	0	3	0
1993	Sanfrecce Hiroshima	J1 League	2	0	0	0	3	0	5	0
1994	Sanfrecce Hiroshima	J1 League	0	0	0	0	0	0	0	0
1995	Cosmo Oil	Football League	27	0	-		-		27	0
1996	Cosmo Oil Yokkaichi	Football League	27	1	-		-		27	1
Total			107	8	0	0	12	0	119	8
