= Masakazu Koda =

Japanese footballer

Masakazu Koda 幸田 将和
Personal information
- Full name: Masakazu Koda
- Date of birth: September 12, 1969 (age 57)
- Place of birth: Ehime, Japan
- Height: 1.72 m (5 ft 7 1/2 in)
- Position: Defender

Youth career
- 1985–1987: Minamiuwa High School

Senior career*
Years	Team	Apps	(Gls)
1988–1994	Sanfrecce Hiroshima		
1995–1998	Vissel Kobe	95	(3)
1999–2001	Yokohama FC	46	(0)
2002–2003	Ehime FC	2	(0)
Total		143	(3)
Medal record
Sanfrecce Hiroshima
Runner-up	J1 League	1994
- * Club domestic league appearances and goals

Masakazu Koda (幸田 将和, Koda Masakazu; born September 12, 1969) is a former Japanese football player.

== Playing career ==
Koda was born in Ehime Prefecture on September 12, 1969. After graduating from high school, he joined Mazda (later Sanfrecce Hiroshima) in 1988. Although he played as a midfielder, he did not play often in matches. In 1995, he moved to the Japan Football League club Vissel Kobe. He was converted to a right side back and became a regular player. In 1997, the club won second place and was promoted to the J1 League. However he did not play as much in 1998. In 1999, he moved to the new club Yokohama FC in the Japan Football League (JFL). He played often and the club won the championships for two consecutive seasons (1999-2000) and the club was promoted to the J2 League. However he did not play as much in 2001. In 2002, he moved to his local club Ehime FC in the JFL. He retired at the end of the 2003 season.

== Club statistics ==
Club performance			League		Cup		League Cup		Total	
Season	Club	League	Apps	Goals	Apps	Goals	Apps	Goals	Apps	Goals
Japan			League		Emperor's Cup		J.League Cup		Total	
1988/89	Mazda	JSL Division 2	0	0	0	0	0	0	0	0
1989/90	Mazda	JSL Division 2								
1990/91	Mazda	JSL Division 2	0	0			0	0	0	0
1991/92	Mazda	JSL Division 1	0	0			0	0	0	0
1992	Sanfrecce Hiroshima	J1 League	-				0	0	0	0
1993	Sanfrecce Hiroshima	J1 League	0	0	0	0	4	0	4	0
1994	Sanfrecce Hiroshima	J1 League	0	0	0	0	0	0	0	0
1995	Vissel Kobe	Football League	28	1	3	0	-		31	1
1996	Vissel Kobe	Football League	29	1	3	0	-		32	1
1997	Vissel Kobe	J1 League	30	1	0	0	6	0	36	1
1998	Vissel Kobe	J1 League	8	0	0	0	0	0	8	0
1999	Yokohama FC	Football League	21	0	3	1	-		24	1
2000	Yokohama FC	Football League	20	0	0	0	-		20	0
2001	Yokohama FC	J2 League	5	0	0	0	1	0	6	0
2002	Ehime FC	Football League	2	0			-		2	0
2003	Ehime FC	Football League	0	0			-		0	0
Total			143	3	9	1	11	0	163	4
