= Július Bielik =

Slovak footballer

Personal information
- Date of birth: 8 March 1962 (age 64)
- Place of birth: Vyškov, Czechoslovakia
- Height: 1.78 m (5 ft 10 in)
- Position: Defender

Senior career*
Years	Team	Apps	(Gls)
1979–1982	Spartak Trnava	57	(2)
1982–1991	Sparta Prague	247	(7)
1991–1992	Mazda / Sanfrecce Hiroshima	20	(1)
1994–1995	Union Cheb	36	(3)
1995–1997	Hradec Králové	18	(0)
Total		378	(13)

International career
1983–1990	Czechoslovakia	18	(0)
1987–1988	Czechoslovakia Olympic	4	(1)

Managerial career
- 1997–1998: Viktoria Žižkov
- 1999: Jablonec
- * Club domestic league appearances and goals

Július Bielik (born 8 March 1962) is a Slovak former football player. He played for Sparta Prague in Czechoslovakia and Sanfrecce Hiroshima in Japan. He played for the Czechoslovakia national team 18 times and was a participant at the 1990 FIFA World Cup.

Bielik played for Spartak Trnava between 1979 and 1982 before moving to Sparta Prague. He won seven Czechoslovak First League titles with Sparta Prague (1983–84, 1984–85, 1986–87, 1987–88, 1988–89, 1989–90 and 1990–91) and then headed to play club football in Japan. Bielik returned to his homeland in 1994 and subsequently played at the top level for Union Cheb and Hradec Králové.

He later coached FK Viktoria Žižkov and FK Jablonec.

== Club statistics ==
Club performance			League	
Season	Club	League	Apps	Goals
Czechoslovakia			League	
1979/80	Spartak Trnava	First League	0	0
1980/81	Spartak Trnava	First League	27	2
1981/82	Spartak Trnava	First League	30	0
1982/83	Sparta Prague	First League	18	0
1983/84	Sparta Prague	First League	28	0
1984/85	Sparta Prague	First League	29	1
1985/86	Sparta Prague	First League	29	2
1986/87	Sparta Prague	First League	30	0
1987/88	Sparta Prague	First League	28	0
1988/89	Sparta Prague	First League	30	1
1989/90	Sparta Prague	First League	31	1
1990/91	Sparta Prague	First League	24	2
Japan			League	
1991/92	Mazda	JSL Division 1	20	1
1992	Sanfrecce Hiroshima	J1 League	-	
Czech Republic			League	
1994/95	Union Cheb	Gambrinus liga	28	3
1995/96	Union Cheb	Gambrinus liga	8	0
1995/96	Hradec Králové	Gambrinus liga	11	0
1996/97	Hradec Králové	Gambrinus liga	7	0
Country	Czechoslovakia		304	9
Country	Japan		20	1
Country	Czech Republic		54	3
Total			378	13

== National team statistics ==
Czechoslovakia national team
Year	Apps	Goals
1983	1	0
1984	0	0
1985	0	0
1986	0	0
1987	2	0
1988	6	0
1989	3	0
1990	6	0
Total	18	0
