= Eiji Hirata =

Japanese footballer

Eiji Hirata 平田 英治
Personal information
- Full name: Eiji Hirata
- Date of birth: May 16, 1966 (age 60)
- Place of birth: Yamaguchi, Yamaguchi, Japan
- Height: 1.75 m (5 ft 9 in)
- Position: Forward

Youth career
- 1982–1984: Yamaguchi High School
- 1985–1988: Waseda University

Senior career*
Years	Team	Apps	(Gls)
1989–1992	Sanfrecce Hiroshima	15	(4)
1993–1994	Švarc Benešov		
1994	Yamaguchi Teachers		
1995–1998	Otsuka Pharmaceutical	78	(1)
- * Club domestic league appearances and goals

Eiji Hirata (平田 英治, Hirata Eiji; born May 16, 1966) is a former Japanese football player.

== Playing career ==
Hirata was born in Yamaguchi on May 16, 1966. After graduating from Waseda University, he joined Japan Soccer League Division 2 club Mazda (later Sanfrecce Hiroshima) in 1989. He debuted in 1990 and he played many matches instead many players for injury. The club also was promoted to Division 1 at the end of the 1990–91 season. In 1993, he moved to the Czech 2. Liga club Švarc Benešov. In 1994, he returned to Japan and joined his local club Yamaguchi Teachers in Regional Leagues. In 1995, he moved to the Japan Football League club Otsuka Pharmaceutical. He retired at the end of the 1998 season.

== Coaching career ==
After retirement, Hirata started coaching career at Otsuka Pharmaceutical (later Tokushima Vortis) in 1999. He mainly served as coach for top team and manager for youth team.
