= Pavel Černý (footballer, born 1962) =

Czech footballer

Personal information
- Date of birth: 11 October 1962 (age 64)
- Place of birth: Nové Město nad Metují, Czechoslovakia
- Height: 1.81 m (5 ft 11 in)
- Positions: Forward; midfielder

Senior career*
Years	Team	Apps	(Gls)
1983–1989	Hradec Králové	144	(78)
1989–1992	Sparta Prague	66	(32)
1992–1994	Sanfrecce Hiroshima	67	(25)
1994–2002	Hradec Králové	191	(46)

International career^{‡}
1989–1991	Czechoslovakia	4	(0)
- * Club domestic league appearances and goals as of 2 August 2007 ‡ National team caps and goals as of 2 August 2007

Pavel Černý (born 11 October 1962) is a former Czech footballer.

Černý began his career with FC Hradec Králové before transferring to Sparta Prague for two seasons. He played in Japan for Sanfrecce Hiroshima and made four appearances for the Czechoslovakia national football team.

Černý's father, Jiří, was a footballer who also played for Hradec Králové. His son, also named Pavel, is a footballer as well.

== Club statistics ==
Club performance			League		Cup		League Cup		Total	
Season	Club	League	Apps	Goals	Apps	Goals	Apps	Goals	Apps	Goals
Czechoslovakia			League		Czechoslovak Cup		League Cup		Total	
1983/84	Spartak Hradec		0	0					0	0
1984/85	Spartak Hradec		30	16					30	16
1985/86	Spartak Hradec		26	15					26	15
1986/87	Spartak Hradec		29	23					29	23
1987/88	Spartak Hradec	First League	29	11					29	11
1988/89	Spartak Hradec	First League	30	13					30	13
1989/90	Spartak Hradec Králové		0	0					0	0
1989/90	Sparta Prague	First League	15	7					15	7
1990/91	Sparta Prague	First League	22	12					22	12
1991/92	Sparta Prague	First League	29	13					29	13
Japan			League		Emperor's Cup		J.League Cup		Total	
1992	Sanfrecce Hiroshima	J1 League	-		2	2	8	2	10	4
1993	Sanfrecce Hiroshima	J1 League	33	10	4	3	1	1	38	14
1994	Sanfrecce Hiroshima	J1 League	34	15	1	0	1	1	36	16
Czech Republic			League		Czech Cup		League Cup		Total	
1994/95	Hradec Králové	Gambrinus liga	15	6					15	6
1995/96	Hradec Králové	Gambrinus liga	26	10					26	10
1996/97	Hradec Králové	Gambrinus liga	21	3					21	3
1997/98	Hradec Králové	Gambrinus liga	25	4					25	4
1998/99	Hradec Králové	Gambrinus liga	23	1					23	1
1999/00	Hradec Králové	Gambrinus liga	29	4					29	4
2000/01	Hradec Králové	2. Liga	29	17					29	17
2001/02	Hradec Králové	Gambrinus liga	23	1					23	1
Country	Czechoslovakia		210	90					210	90
Country	Japan		67	25	7	5	10	4	84	34
Country	Czech Republic		191	46					191	46
Total			468	161	7	5	10	4	485	170

== National team statistics ==
Czechoslovakia national team
Year	Apps	Goals
1989	1	0
1990	2	0
1991	1	0
Total	4	0
