= Hiroshima General Ground Main Stadium =

Multi-purpose stadium in Hiroshima, Japan

Coordinates: 34°22′32″N 132°25′23″E

Coca-Cola West Hiroshima Stadium
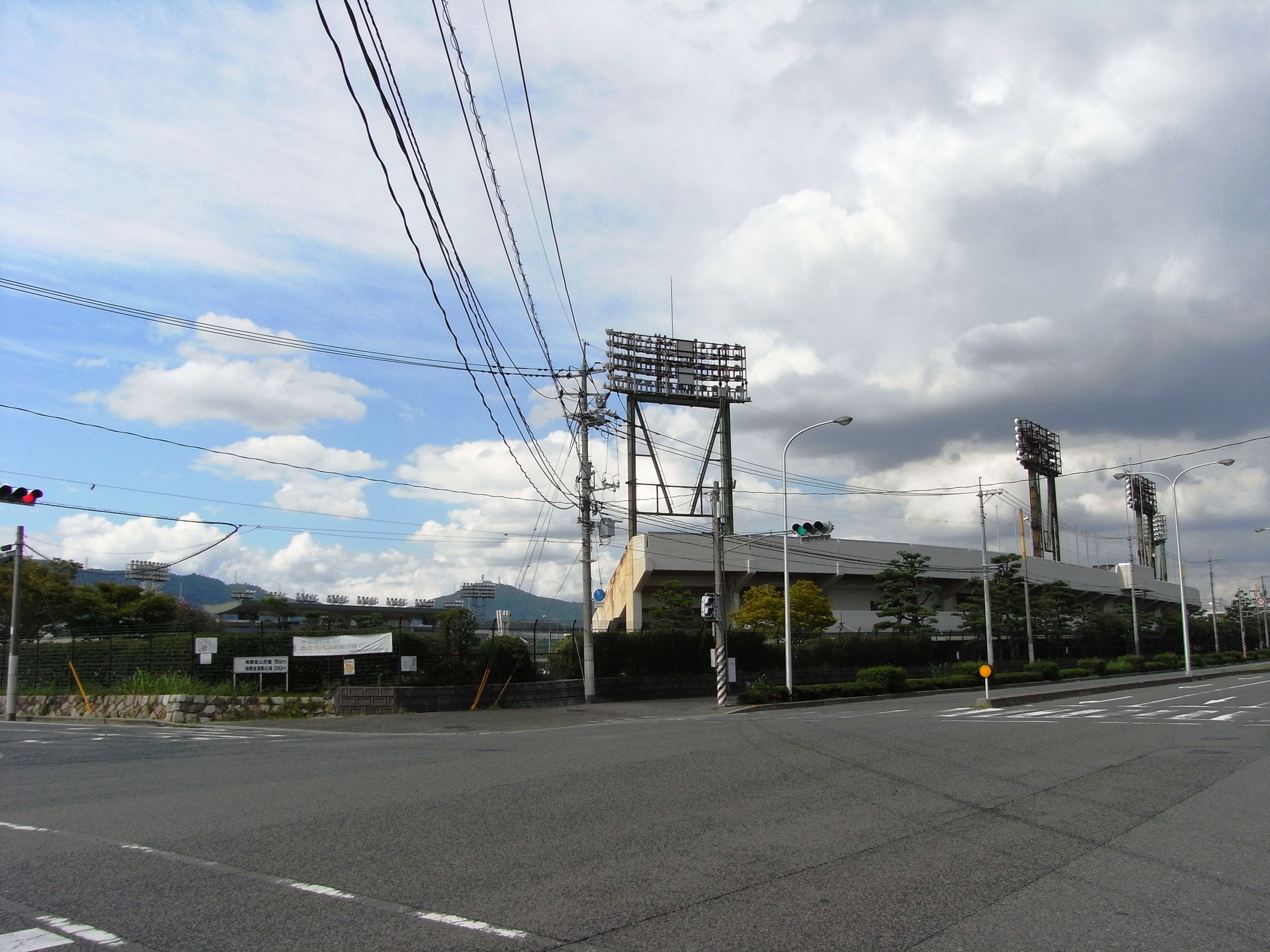
- Interactive map of Coca-Cola West Hiroshima Stadium
- Former names: Hiroshima Stadium (1941-2008)
- Location: Hiroshima, Japan
- Owner: Hiroshima Prefecture
- Capacity: 13,800
- Surface: Grass
- Field size: 106 x 71 m

Construction
- Opened: 1941
- Renovated: 1992

Coca-Cola West Hiroshima Stadium (Coca-Cola West 広島スタジアム) is a multi-purpose stadium in Hiroshima, Japan. It is currently used mostly for football matches and was the home stadium of Sanfrecce Hiroshima until 1995. The stadium holds 13,800 people.
