= 1994 J.League =

2nd season of J1 League

J.League
- Season: 1994
- Champions: Verdy Kawasaki; 2nd J.League title 7th Japanese title
- Asian Club Championship: Verdy Kawasaki
- Matches: 264
- Goals: 841 (3.19 per match)
- Top goalscorer: Frank Ordenewitz (30 goals)
- Highest attendance: 55,125 – Reds vs. Verdy (September 17)
- Lowest attendance: 7,854 – Reds vs. Sanfrecce (March 23)
- Total attendance: 5,152,117
- Average attendance: 19,516

The J.League 1994 season was the second season of the J.League. The league commenced on March 12 and completed on November 19. The Suntory Championship took place on November 26 and December 2.

== Clubs ==
The following 12 clubs participated in J.League during 1994 season. Of these clubs, Bellmare Hiratsuka and Júblio Iwata were newly promoted teams from Japan Football League.

Club name	Hometown	Stadium (majority games)	Capacity	Notes	Head coach
Bellmare Hiratsuka	Hiratsuka, Kanagawa	Hiratsuka Stadium	15,380	Promoted	(Japan) Mitsuru Komaeda
Gamba Osaka	Osaka, Osaka	Osaka Expo '70 Stadium	21,000		(Japan) Kunishige Kamamoto
JEF United Ichihara	Chiba, Chiba	Ichihara Seaside Stadium	14,051		(Japan) Eijun Kiyokumo
Júbilo Iwata	Iwata, Shizuoka	Júbilo Iwata Stadium	15,165	Promoted	(Netherlands) Hans Ooft
Kashima Antlers	Kashima, Ibaraki	Kashima Soccer Stadium	37,638		(Brazil) Edu Coimbra
Nagoya Grampus Eight	Nagoya, Aichi	Paloma Mizuho Rugby Stadium	11,900		(England) Gordon Milne
Sanfrecce Hiroshima	Hiroshima, Hiroshima	Hiroshima General Ground Main Stadium	13,800		(Scotland) Stuart Baxter
Shimizu S-Pulse	Shimizu-ku, Shizuoka, Shizuoka Prefecture	Nihondaira Sports Stadium	20,248		(Brazil) Rivellino
Urawa Red Diamonds	Saitama, Greater Tokyo Area	Urawa Komaba Stadium	21,500		(Japan) Kenzo Yokoyama
Verdy Kawasaki	Kawasaki, Kanagawa	Todoroki Athletics Stadium	26,232		(Japan) Yasutaro Matsuki
Yokohama Flügels	Yokohama	Yokohama Mitsuzawa Stadium	15,454		(Japan) Shu Kamo
Yokohama Marinos	Yokohama	Yokohama Mitsuzawa Stadium	15,454		(Japan) Hidehiko Shimizu

=== Foreign players ===
Club	Player 1	Player 2	Player 3	Player 4	Player 5	Non-visa foreign	Former players
Bellmare Hiratsuka	(Brazil) Almir	(Brazil) Betinho	(Brazil) Edson	(Brazil) Mirandinha			
Gamba Osaka	(Belarus) Sergei Aleinikov	(Brazil) Flávio Campos	(Bulgaria) Kiril Metkov	(Ukraine) Akhrik Tsveiba	(Ukraine) Oleh Protasov		
JEF United Ichihara	(Czech Republic) František Mysliveček	(Czech Republic) Pavel Řehák	(Federal Republic of Yugoslavia) Nenad Maslovar	(Germany) Frank Ordenewitz	(Germany) Pierre Littbarski	(Brazil) Sandro (South Korea) Shin Che-bon	
Júbilo Iwata	(Brazil) Walter	(Italy) Salvatore Schillaci	(Netherlands) André Paus	(Netherlands) Gerald Vanenburg			
Kashima Antlers	(Brazil) Alcindo	(Brazil) Edinho	(Brazil) Leonardo	(Brazil) Santos			(Brazil) Zico
Nagoya Grampus Eight	(Brazil) Elivélton	(Brazil) Garça	(Brazil) Jorginho	(Federal Republic of Yugoslavia) Dragan Stojković	(Federal Republic of Yugoslavia) Dragiša Binić	(Netherlands) Dido Havenaar	(England) Gary Lineker
Sanfrecce Hiroshima	(Czech Republic) Ivan Hašek	(Czech Republic) Pavel Černý	(Norway) Tore Pedersen	(Scotland) Lee Baxter	(South Korea) Noh Jung-yoon	(Brazil) Andrey	
Shimizu S-Pulse	(Brazil) Djalminha	(Brazil) Ronaldão	(Brazil) Sidmar	(Brazil) Toninho		(Brazil) Ademir	
Urawa Red Diamonds	(Germany) Guido Buchwald	(Germany) Michael Rummenigge	(Germany) Uwe Bein	(Slovakia) Ľubomír Luhový		(Peru) Edwin Uehara (South Korea) Cho Kwi-jae	(Germany) Uwe Rahn (Slovakia) Miroslav Mentel
Verdy Kawasaki	(Brazil) Bentinho	(Brazil) Bismarck	(Brazil) Capitão	(Brazil) Paulo	(Brazil) Pereira	(Bolivia) Ko Ishikawa	
Yokohama Flügels	(Argentina) Fernando Moner	(Brazil) Aldro	(Brazil) Edu Marangon	(Brazil) Válber			(Spain) Raúl Amarilla
Yokohama Marinos	(Argentina) David Bisconti	(Argentina) Gustavo Zapata	(Argentina) Ramón Díaz	(Argentina) Ramón Medina Bello			(Brazil) Everton

== Format ==
In the 1994 season, the league followed split-season format, just like the previous season. Each halves (or stages) were known as Suntory Series and NICOS Series for sponsorship purposes. In each series, twelve clubs played in double round-robin format with a total of 22 games per club (per series). The games then went to golden-goal extra time and penalties if needed after regulation. The clubs were ranked by number of wins, and tie breakers are, in the following order:

- Goal differential
- Goals scored
- Head-to-head results
- Extra match or a coin toss

The club that finished at the top of the table is declared stage champion and qualifies for the Suntory Championship. The first stage winner hosts the first leg in the championship series. If the same club win both stages, the runners-up of each stages plays against each other and the winners challenges the stage winner at the championship game.

Changes in competition format

- Number of competing clubs increased from 10 to 12
- Number of games per club in a series increased from 18 to 22 games and from 36 to 44 games per season.

== Standings ==
=== Suntory Series (1st Stage) standings ===
Pos	Team	Pld	W	L	GF	GA	GD	Qualification
1	(Hiroshima Prefecture) Sanfrecce Hiroshima	22	17	5	44	26	+18	1994 Suntory Series Champions; Qualified to Suntory Championship '94
2	(Shizuoka Prefecture) Shimizu S-Pulse	22	16	6	41	25	+16	
3	(Ibaraki Prefecture) Kashima Antlers	22	16	6	45	32	+13	
4	(Tokyo) Verdy Kawasaki	22	14	8	43	21	+22	
5	(Kanagawa Prefecture) Yokohama Flügels	22	13	9	36	27	+9	
6	(Chiba Prefecture) JEF United Ichihara	22	10	12	34	43	−9	
7	(Shizuoka Prefecture) Júbilo Iwata	22	9	13	27	32	−5	
8	(Aichi Prefecture) Nagoya Grampus Eight	22	9	13	23	28	−5	
9	(Kanagawa Prefecture) Yokohama Marinos	22	8	14	29	35	−6	
10	(Osaka Prefecture) Gamba Osaka	22	7	15	37	46	−9	
11	(Kanagawa Prefecture) Bellmare Hiratsuka	22	7	15	27	54	−27	
12	(Saitama Prefecture) Urawa Red Diamonds	22	6	16	26	43	−17	

=== NICOS Series (2nd stage) standings ===
Pos	Team	Pld	W	L	GF	GA	GD	Qualification
1	Verdy Kawasaki	22	17	5	48	26	+22	1994 NICOS Series Champions; Qualifies to Suntory Championship '94
2	Bellmare Hiratsuka	22	16	6	48	26	+22	
3	Yokohama Marinos	22	14	8	44	26	+18	
4	Sanfrecce Hiroshima	22	12	10	27	31	−4	
5	Kashima Antlers	22	11	11	44	36	+8	
6	Shimizu S-Pulse	22	11	11	28	31	−3	
7	Júbilo Iwata	22	11	11	29	37	−8	
8	Yokohama Flügels	22	9	13	31	33	−2	
9	JEF United Ichihara	22	9	13	35	42	−7	
10	Gamba Osaka	22	8	14	29	36	−7	
11	Urawa Red Diamonds	22	8	14	33	51	−18	
12	Nagoya Grampus Eight	22	6	16	33	54	−21	

=== Suntory Championship '94 ===
November 26, 1994
14:38

Sanfrecce Hiroshima	0 – 1	Verdy Kawasaki
		35' Kitazawa

Hiroshima Big Arch
Attendance: 42,316
Referee: Alberto Tejada

December 2, 1994
19:02

Verdy Kawasaki	1 – 0	Sanfrecce Hiroshima
Ramos 80'

Tokyo National Stadium
Attendance: 50,512
Referee: Zoran Petrović

VERDY KAWASAKI won the series on 2-0 aggregate.

=== Overall standings ===
Pos	Team	Pld	W	L	GF	GA	GD	Qualification
1	Verdy Kawasaki	44	31	13	91	47	+44	1994 J.League Champions; Qualifies to 1995/96 ACC, 1995 Super Cup, and 1995 Sanwa Bank Cup
2	Sanfrecce Hiroshima	44	29	15	71	57	+14	
3	Kashima Antlers	44	27	17	89	68	+21	
4	Shimizu S-Pulse	44	27	17	69	56	+13	
5	Bellmare Hiratsuka	44	23	21	75	80	−5	
6	Yokohama Marinos	44	22	22	73	61	+12	
7	Yokohama Flügels	44	22	22	67	60	+7	
8	Júbilo Iwata	44	20	24	56	69	−13	
9	JEF United Ichihara	44	19	25	69	85	−16	
10	Gamba Osaka	44	15	29	66	82	−16	
11	Nagoya Grampus Eight	44	15	29	56	82	−26	
12	Urawa Red Diamonds	44	14	30	59	94	−35	

== Honours ==
Competition	Champion	Runner-up	3rd place
League Competition
J.League Suntory Series	Sanfrecce Hiroshima	Shimizu S-Pulse	Kashima Antlers
J.League NICOS Series	Verdy Kawasaki	Bellmare Hiratsuka	Yokohama Marinos
Suntory Championship	Verdy Kawasaki	Sanfrecce Hiroshima	
Cup Tournaments
Emperor's Cup	Bellmare Hiratsuka	Cerezo Osaka	Yokohama Marinos; Gamba Osaka
Nabisco Cup	Verdy Kawasaki	Júbilo Iwata	Gamba Osaka; Yokohama Marinos
XEROX Super Cup	Verdy Kawasaki	Yokohama Flügels	

== Top scorers ==
Rank	Scorer	Club	Goals
1	(Germany) Frank Ordenewitz	JEF United Ichihara	30
2	(Brazil) Alcindo Sartori	Kashima Antlers	28
3	(Brazil) Betinho	Bellmare Hiratsuka	24
4	(Argentina) Ramón Díaz	Yokohama Marinos	23
4	(Japan) Nobuhiro Takeda	Verdy Kawasaki	23
6	(Brazil) Toninho	Shimizu S-Pulse	22
7	(Japan) Yoshiyuki Hasegawa	Kashima Antlers	21
8	(Czech Republic) Ivan Hašek	Sanfrecce Hiroshima	19
8	(Japan) Koji Noguchi	Bellmare Hiratsuka	19
10	(Japan) Kazuyoshi Miura	Verdy Kawasaki	16
10	(Japan) Toshihiro Yamaguchi	Gamba Osaka	16
12	(Argentina) Ramón Medina Bello	Yokohama Marinos	15
12	(Czechoslovakia) Pavel Černý	Sanfrecce Hiroshima	15
14	(Brazil) Bismarck	Verdy Kawasaki	14
14	(Japan) Takuya Takagi	Sanfrecce Hiroshima	14

== Awards ==
=== Individual awards ===
Award	Recipient	Club
Most Valuable Player	(Brazil) Pereira	Verdy Kawasaki
Rookie of the Year	(Japan) Kazuaki Tasaka	Bellmare Hiratsuka
Manager of the Year	(Japan) Yasutaro Matsuki	Verdy Kawasaki
Top Scorer	(Germany) Frank Ordenewitz	JEF United Ichihara

=== Best Eleven ===
Position	Footballer	Club	Nationality
GK	Shinkichi Kikuchi	Verdy Kawasaki	Japan
DF	Pereira	Verdy Kawasaki	Brazil
DF	Masami Ihara	Yokohama Marinos	Japan
DF	Yoshihiro Natsuka	Bellmare Hiratsuka	Japan
MF	Betinho	Bellmare Hiratsuka	Brazil
MF	Bismarck	Verdy Kawasaki	Brazil
MF	Tetsuji Hashiratani	Verdy Kawasaki	Japan
MF	Tsuyoshi Kitazawa	Verdy Kawasaki	Japan
MF	Ruy Ramos	Verdy Kawasaki	Japan
FW	Takuya Takagi	Sanfrecce Hiroshima	Japan
FW	Nobuhiro Takeda	Verdy Kawasaki	Japan
