= 1995 Emperor's Cup final =

1995 Emperor's Cup Final
| Nagoya Grampus Eight | Sanfrecce Hiroshima |
| 3 | 0 |
- Date: January 1, 1996
- Venue: National Stadium, Tokyo

1995 Emperor's Cup Final was the 75th final of the Emperor's Cup competition. The final was played at National Stadium in Tokyo on January 1, 1996. Nagoya Grampus Eight won the championship.

== Overview ==
Nagoya Grampus Eight won their first title by defeating Sanfrecce Hiroshima 3–0, with goals from Takafumi Ogura and Takashi Hirano.

== Match details ==
January 1, 1996

| Nagoya Grampus Eight | 3–0 | Sanfrecce Hiroshima |
|---|---|---|
| Takafumi Ogura 18', 52'; Takashi Hirano 53' |

National Stadium

Nagoya Grampus Eight
| GK | 1 | (Japan) Yuji Ito |
| DF | 2 | (Japan) Seiichi Ogawa |
| DF | 3 | (Japan) Go Oiwa |
| DF | 4 | (Japan) Kazuhisa Iijima |
| DF | 5 | (Brazil) Torres |
| MF | 7 | (France) Durix |
| MF | 8 | (Japan) Tetsuya Asano |
| MF | 9 | (Japan) Takashi Hirano | (substituted off) 89' |
| MF | 21 | (Japan) Tetsuya Okayama | (substituted off) 85' |
| FW | 10 | (Federal Republic of Yugoslavia) Stojković |
| FW | 11 | (Japan) Takafumi Ogura | (substituted off) 73' |
Substitutes:
| | 16 | (Japan) Ken Ishikawa |
| | 19 | (Japan) Kei Taniguchi |
| | 12 | (Japan) Naoki Mori | (substituted on) 89' |
| | 18 | (Japan) Tetsuo Nakanishi | (substituted on) 73' |
| | 15 | (Japan) Yasuyuki Moriyama | (substituted on) 85' |
Manager:
(France) Wenger

Sanfrecce Hiroshima
| GK | 1 | (Japan) Kazuya Maekawa |
| DF | 3 | (Japan) Hiroshige Yanagimoto |
| DF | 12 | (Japan) Mitsuaki Kojima |
| DF | 14 | (Japan) Kenichi Uemura |
| MF | 5 | (Japan) Ryuji Michiki |
| MF | 7 | (Japan) Hajime Moriyasu |
| MF | 11 | (Netherlands) Huistra | (substituted off) 61' |
| MF | 13 | (Japan) Masato Fue | (substituted off) 61' |
| MF | 19 | (Japan) Hiroyoshi Kuwabara |
| FW | 9 | (South Korea) Noh Jung-yoon |
| FW | 10 | (Japan) Takuya Takagi |
Substitutes:
| | 16 | (Japan) Takashi Shimoda |
| | 2 | (Japan) Yasuyuki Sato |
| | 4 | (Japan) Yoshiro Moriyama | (substituted on) 61' |
| | 17 | (Japan) Susumu Oki | (substituted on) 61' |
| | 20 | (Japan) Iwao Yamane |
Manager:
(Netherlands) Jansen

== See also ==
- 1995 Emperor's Cup
