= 1996 Emperor's Cup final =

1996 Emperor's Cup Final
Verdy Kawasaki	Sanfrecce Hiroshima
3	0
- Date: January 1, 1997
- Venue: National Stadium, Tokyo

1996 Emperor's Cup Final was the 76th final of the Emperor's Cup competition. The final was played at National Stadium in Tokyo on January 1, 1997. Verdy Kawasaki won the championship.

== Overview ==
Verdy Kawasaki won their 4th title, by defeating Sanfrecce Hiroshima 3–0 with Tsuyoshi Kitazawa, Yasutoshi Miura and Keisuke Kurihara goal.

== Match details ==
January 1, 1997

Verdy Kawasaki	3–0	Sanfrecce Hiroshima
Tsuyoshi Kitazawa 3'; Yasutoshi Miura 11'; Keisuke Kurihara 59'

National Stadium

Verdy Kawasaki
GK	(Japan) Shinkichi Kikuchi
DF	(Japan) Toshimi Kikuchi
DF	(Brazil) Argel
DF	(Japan) Kentaro Hayashi
DF	(Japan) Tadashi Nakamura
DF	(Japan) Tomo Sugawara
MF	(Japan) Yasutoshi Miura
MF	(Brazil) Bismarck
MF	(Japan) Tsuyoshi Kitazawa
FW	(Japan) Keisuke Kurihara	(substituted off) 81'
FW	(Japan) Kazuyoshi Miura
Substitutes:
	(Japan) Keiji Ishizuka	(substituted on) 81'
Manager:
(Brazil) Leao

Sanfrecce Hiroshima
GK	(Japan) Kazuya Maekawa
DF	(Japan) Naoki Naito	(substituted off) 71'
DF	(Japan) Hiroshige Yanagimoto
DF	(Japan) Mitsuaki Kojima
MF	(Japan) Ryuji Michiki
MF	(Japan) Hajime Moriyasu
MF	(Japan) Yasuhiro Yoshida	(substituted off) 78'
MF	(Brazil) Santos
MF	(Japan) Hiroyoshi Kuwabara
FW	(South Korea) Noh Jung-yoon
FW	(Japan) Takuya Takagi
Substitutes:
	(Japan) Tatsuhiko Kubo	(substituted on) 71'
	(Japan) Yuta Abe	(substituted on) 78'
Manager:
(Netherlands) Jansen

== See also ==
- 1996 Emperor's Cup
