= 1997 Sanfrecce Hiroshima season =

The 1997 Sanfrecce Hiroshima season refers to the club’s performance in Japan’s top football competitions during the year 1997. That season, the team played in the J1 League, finished in the lower half of the table, and also competed in the Emperor’s Cup and the J.League Cup, where they reached the mid stages but did not advance to the finals.

== Competitions ==
Competitions	Position
J.League	12th / 17 clubs
Emperor's Cup	4th round
J.League Cup	GL-D 3rd / 4 clubs

== Domestic results ==
=== J.League ===
12 April 1997 1-1	Júbilo Iwata	2-1	Sanfrecce Hiroshima	Júbilo Iwata Stadium
JST (UTC+09)

16 April 1997 1-2	Sanfrecce Hiroshima	2-3	Kashiwa Reysol	Hiroshima Big Arch
JST (UTC+09)

19 April 1997 1-3	Urawa Red Diamonds	0-1	Sanfrecce Hiroshima	Tokyo National Stadium
JST (UTC+09)

23 April 1997 1-4	Sanfrecce Hiroshima	2-0	Gamba Osaka	Hiroshima Big Arch
JST (UTC+09)

26 April 1997 1-5	Verdy Kawasaki	1-2	Sanfrecce Hiroshima	Todoroki Athletics Stadium
JST (UTC+09)

3 May 1997 1-6	Sanfrecce Hiroshima	1-0	Kyoto Purple Sanga	Hiroshima Big Arch
JST (UTC+09)

7 May 1997 1-7	JEF United Ichihara	3-2 (GG) (a.e.t.)	Sanfrecce Hiroshima	Ichihara Seaside Stadium
JST (UTC+09)

10 May 1997 1-8	Sanfrecce Hiroshima	0-1 (GG) (a.e.t.)	Bellmare Hiratsuka	Hiroshima Big Arch
JST (UTC+09)

17 May 1997 1-9	Yokohama Marinos	4-2	Sanfrecce Hiroshima	Yokohama Mitsuzawa Stadium
JST (UTC+09)

24 May 1997 1-10	Sanfrecce Hiroshima	1-0	Shimizu S-Pulse	Ehime Matsuyama Athletic Stadium
JST (UTC+09)

1-11	bye

31 May 1997 1-12	Avispa Fukuoka	0-1	Sanfrecce Hiroshima	Hakatanomori Football Stadium
JST (UTC+09)

5 July 1997 1-13	Sanfrecce Hiroshima	2-2 (GG) (a.e.t.) (3-2 p)	Cerezo Osaka	Hiroshima Big Arch
JST (UTC+09)

9 July 1997 1-14	Vissel Kobe	0-1 (GG) (a.e.t.)	Sanfrecce Hiroshima	Kobe Universiade Memorial Stadium
JST (UTC+09)

12 July 1997 1-15	Sanfrecce Hiroshima	2-3	Kashima Antlers	Hiroshima Big Arch
JST (UTC+09)

16 July 1997 1-16	Nagoya Grampus Eight	1-0	Sanfrecce Hiroshima	Mizuho Athletic Stadium
JST (UTC+09)

19 July 1997 1-17	Sanfrecce Hiroshima	2-3	Yokohama Flügels	Hiroshima Big Arch
JST (UTC+09)

30 July 1997 2-1	Sanfrecce Hiroshima	1-0	Nagoya Grampus Eight	Hiroshima Big Arch
JST (UTC+09)

2 August 1997 2-2	Sanfrecce Hiroshima	1-3	Júbilo Iwata	Hiroshima Big Arch
JST (UTC+09)

6 August 1997 2-3	Kashiwa Reysol	2-1	Sanfrecce Hiroshima	Hitachi Kashiwa Soccer Stadium
JST (UTC+09)

9 August 1997 2-4	Sanfrecce Hiroshima	1-2	Urawa Red Diamonds	Hiroshima Big Arch
JST (UTC+09)

16 August 1997 2-5	Gamba Osaka	3-0	Sanfrecce Hiroshima	Osaka Expo '70 Stadium
JST (UTC+09)

20 August 1997 2-6	Sanfrecce Hiroshima	3-1	Verdy Kawasaki	Hiroshima Big Arch
JST (UTC+09)

23 August 1997 2-7	Kyoto Purple Sanga	0-3	Sanfrecce Hiroshima	Nishikyogoku Athletic Stadium
JST (UTC+09)

30 August 1997 2-8	Sanfrecce Hiroshima	3-0	JEF United Ichihara	Hiroshima Big Arch
JST (UTC+09)

3 September 1997 2-9	Bellmare Hiratsuka	2-0	Sanfrecce Hiroshima	Hiratsuka Athletics Stadium
JST (UTC+09)

6 September 1997 2-10	Sanfrecce Hiroshima	2-3 (GG) (a.e.t.)	Yokohama Marinos	Hiroshima Big Arch
JST (UTC+09)

10 September 1997 2-11	Kashima Antlers	2-1 (GG) (a.e.t.)	Sanfrecce Hiroshima	Kashima Soccer Stadium
JST (UTC+09)

13 September 1997 2-12	Shimizu S-Pulse	1-0	Sanfrecce Hiroshima	Nihondaira Sports Stadium
JST (UTC+09)

20 September 1997 2-13	Sanfrecce Hiroshima	1-3	Avispa Fukuoka	Hiroshima Big Arch
JST (UTC+09)

2-14	bye

27 September 1997 2-15	Cerezo Osaka	3-1	Sanfrecce Hiroshima	Oita Athletic Stadium
JST (UTC+09)

1 October 1997 2-16	Sanfrecce Hiroshima	2-0	Vissel Kobe	Hiroshima Big Arch
JST (UTC+09)

4 October 1997 2-17	Yokohama Flügels	2-1	Sanfrecce Hiroshima	Yokohama Mitsuzawa Stadium
JST (UTC+09)

=== Emperor's Cup ===
1st Round	bye

2nd Round	bye

14 December 1997 3rd Round	Sanfrecce Hiroshima	3-1	Montedio Yamagata	Hiroshima Stadium
JST (UTC+09)

20 December 1997 4th Round	Shimizu S-Pulse	3-1	Sanfrecce Hiroshima	Tochigi Green Stadium
JST (UTC+09)

=== J.League Cup ===
8 March 1997 GL-D-1	Nagoya Grampus Eight	2-1	Sanfrecce Hiroshima	Gifu Nagaragawa Stadium
JST (UTC+09)

15 March 1997 GL-D-2	Sanfrecce Hiroshima	0-2	Kashiwa Reysol	Hiroshima Big Arch
JST (UTC+09)

19 March 1997 GL-D-3	Sanfrecce Hiroshima	1-0	Vissel Kobe	Hiroshima Big Arch
JST (UTC+09)

22 March 1997 GL-D-4	Kashiwa Reysol	3-0	Sanfrecce Hiroshima	Hitachi Kashiwa Soccer Stadium
JST (UTC+09)

26 March 1997 GL-D-5	Vissel Kobe	2-2	Sanfrecce Hiroshima	Kobe Universiade Memorial Stadium
JST (UTC+09)

29 March 1997 GL-D-6	Sanfrecce Hiroshima	4-2	Nagoya Grampus Eight	Hiroshima Big Arch
JST (UTC+09)

== Player statistics ==
No.	Pos.	Nat.	Player	D.o.B. (Age)	Height / Weight	J.League		Emperor's Cup		J.League Cup		Total	
No.	Pos.	Nat.	Player	D.o.B. (Age)	Height / Weight	Apps	Goals	Apps	Goals	Apps	Goals	Apps	Goals
1	GK	(Japan)	Kazuya Maekawa	March 22, 1968 (aged 28)	188 cm / 84 kg	24	0	0	0	6	0	30	0
2	DF	(Australia)	Popovic	July 4, 1973 (aged 23)	cm / kg	11	0	0	0	6	0	17	0
3	DF	(Japan)	Hiroshige Yanagimoto	October 15, 1972 (aged 24)	173 cm / 64 kg	13	0	0	0	0	0	13	0
4	MF	(Japan)	Hiroyoshi Kuwabara	October 2, 1971 (aged 25)	177 cm / 71 kg	32	0	2	0	5	1	39	1
5	DF	(Japan)	Tetsuya Ito	October 1, 1970 (aged 26)	178 cm / 69 kg	26	0	2	0	5	0	33	0
6	MF	(Japan)	Mitsuaki Kojima	July 14, 1968 (aged 28)	173 cm / 70 kg	30	0	2	0	5	0	37	0
7	MF	(Japan)	Hajime Moriyasu	August 23, 1968 (aged 28)	173 cm / 62 kg	25	1	2	0	5	0	32	1
8	MF	(Japan)	Yasuhiro Yoshida	July 14, 1969 (aged 27)	172 cm / 70 kg	29	2	0	0	6	0	35	2
9	FW	(Australia)	Arnold	August 3, 1963 (aged 33)	185 cm / 80 kg	18	6	0	0	5	4	23	10
10	MF	(Japan)	Tatsuhiko Kubo	June 18, 1976 (aged 20)	181 cm / 71 kg	22	7	2	0	5	1	29	8
11	FW	(Japan)	Masato Fue	February 22, 1973 (aged 24)	174 cm / 65 kg	22	1	2	0	6	0	30	1
12	FW	(Japan)	Susumu Oki	February 23, 1976 (aged 21)	177 cm / 75 kg	11	1	1	0	0	0	12	1
13	MF	(Brazil)	Santos	June 8, 1964 (aged 32)	179 cm / 80 kg	8	3	0	0	4	2	12	5
14	FW	(South Korea)	Noh Jung-Yoon	March 28, 1971 (aged 25)	172 cm / 68 kg	12	2	2	1	3	0	17	3
15	MF	(Japan)	Yuta Abe	July 31, 1974 (aged 22)	177 cm / 69 kg	6	0	0	0	0	0	6	0
16	GK	(Japan)	Takashi Shimoda	November 28, 1975 (aged 21)	183 cm / 74 kg	9	0	2	0	0	0	11	0
17	MF	(Japan)	Ryuji Michiki	August 25, 1973 (aged 23)	174 cm / 64 kg	26	1	2	0	0	0	28	1
18	FW	(Japan)	Takuya Takagi	November 12, 1967 (aged 29)	188 cm / 82 kg	26	12	2	1	0	0	28	13
19	DF	(Japan)	Kenichi Uemura	April 22, 1974 (aged 22)	180 cm / 70 kg	3	0	0	0	0	0	3	0
20	FW	(Japan)	Kenji Wakai	September 22, 1974 (aged 22)	171 cm / 68 kg	1	0	0	0	2	0	3	0
21	FW	(Japan)	Iwao Yamane	July 31, 1976 (aged 20)	170 cm / 62 kg	20	2	2	0	0	0	22	2
22	GK	(Japan)	Tetsuharu Yamaguchi	September 8, 1977 (aged 19)	184 cm / 82 kg	0	0		0	0	0		0
23	DF	(Japan)	Takashi Kageyama	May 27, 1977 (aged 19)	180 cm / 67 kg	1	0	0	0	0	0	1	0
24	MF	(Japan)	Kota Hattori	November 22, 1977 (aged 19)	175 cm / 71 kg	18	0	2	0	5	0	25	0
25	MF	(Japan)	Keita Kanemoto	July 13, 1977 (aged 19)	173 cm / 71 kg	8	0	1	0	2	0	11	0
26	FW	(Japan)	Hisashi Hiroike	October 25, 1978 (aged 18)	165 cm / 58 kg	0	0		0	0	0		0
27	DF	(Japan)	Shinya Kawashima	July 20, 1978 (aged 18)	187 cm / 77 kg	0	0		0	0	0		0
28	FW	(Japan)	Yuya Matsuoka	June 15, 1978 (aged 18)	173 cm / 64 kg	0	0		0	0	0		0
29	FW	(Japan)	Kazuyoshi Matsunaga †	November 13, 1977 (aged 19)	-cm / -kg	3	1	2	2	0	0	5	3
30	DF	(Japan)	Toru Yasutake †	December 20, 1978 (aged 18)	-cm / -kg	2	0	0	0	0	0	2	0
31	GK	(Japan)	Minoru Ueda †	June 20, 1977 (aged 19)	-cm / -kg	0	0		0	0	0		0
32	MF	(Japan)	Shoji Akimitsu †	May 7, 1977 (aged 19)	-cm / -kg	0	0		0	0	0		0
33	FW	(Japan)	Takahisa Iwamura †	May 11, 1978 (aged 18)	-cm / -kg	0	0		0	0	0		0
34	DF	(Japan)	Ryoji Araki †	May 10, 1978 (aged 18)	-cm / -kg	0	0		0	0	0		0
35	MF	(England)	Crook †	January 18, 1963 (aged 34)	-cm / -kg	15	3	0	0	0	0	15	3

- † player(s) joined the team after the opening of this season.

== Transfers ==
In:

No.	Pos.	Nation	Player
22	GK	JPN	Tetsuharu Yamaguchi
2	DF	AUS	Tony Popovic (from Sydney United)
5	DF	JPN	Tetsuya Ito (from Yokohama Marinos)
27	DF	JPN	Shinya Kawashima (from Shimizu Commercial High School)
9	FW	AUS	Graham James Arnold (from NAC Breda)
20	FW	JPN	Kenji Wakai (from University of Tsukuba)
26	FW	JPN	Hisashi Hiroike (from Hosho Senior High School)
28	FW	JPN	Yuya Matsuoka (from Ehime FC youth)

Out:

No.	Pos.	Nation	Player
—	GK	JPN	Kazumasa Kawano (to Nagoya Grampus Eight)
—	GK	JPN	Masato Tamada (to Albirex Niigata)
—	GK	JPN	Minoru Ueda
—	DF	JPN	Yasuyuki Sato (to Ōita F.C.)
—	DF	JPN	Naoki Naito (to Vissel Kobe)
—	MF	JPN	Takashi Onishi (to Kyoto Purple Sanga)
—	MF	JPN	Hideaki Hagino
—	MF	JPN	Koji Yoshimura (to Vissel Kobe)
—	MF	JPN	Tsukimitsu Mizuta
—	MF	JPN	Shoji Akimitsu
—	FW	NED	Huistra
—	FW	JPN	Jun Takata (to Brummel Sendai)
—	FW	JPN	Kazuyoshi Matsunaga

== Transfers during the season ==
=== In ===
- (Japan) Kazuyoshi Matsunaga
- (Japan) Toru Yasutake (from Sanfrecce Hiroshima youth)
- (Japan) Minoru Ueda
- (Japan) Shoji Akimitsu
- (Japan) Takahisa Iwamura (from Sanfrecce Hiroshima youth)
- (Japan) Ryoji Araki
- (England) Ian Stuart Crook (from Norwich City on July)

=== Out ===
- (Brazil) Santos (on June)

== Awards ==
none

== Other pages ==
- (in Japanese) J. League official site
- (in Japanese) Sanfrecce Hiroshima official site
