= 1996 Sanfrecce Hiroshima season =

Sanfrecce Hiroshima
1996 season
- Manager: Wim Jansen
- Stadium: Hiroshima Big Arch
- J.League: 14th
- Emperor's Cup: Runners-up
- J.League Cup: GL-A 3rd
- Top goalscorer: Takuya Takagi (11)
- Highest home attendance: 18,863 (vs Kashima Antlers, 20 March 1996)
- Lowest home attendance: 4,491 (vs Avispa Fukuoka, 6 November 1996)
- Average home league attendance: 8,469
Home colours	Away colours

This article details the 1996 season of Sanfrecce Hiroshima.

== Review and events ==
=== League results summary ===
Overall								Home						Away					
Pld	W	D	L	GF	GA	GD	Pts	W	D	L	GF	GA	GD	W	D	L	GF	GA	GD
30	10	0	20	36	60	−24	30	4	0	11	22	33	−11	6	0	9	14	27	−13

Source: J.LEAGUE OFFICIAL GUIDE 1997. ISBN 4-09-102329-0.

=== League results by round ===
Round	1	2	3	4	5	6	7	8	9	10	11	12	13	14	15	16	17	18	19	20	21	22	23	24	25	26	27	28	29	30
Ground	A	H	A	H	A	A	H	A	H	H	A	A	H	A	H	H	A	H	A	H	A	H	A	H	H	A	H	A	H	A
Result	W	L	W	L	L	L	W	W	L	L	W	L	L	W	L	L	L	L	L	L	W	W	L	L	W	L	W	L	L	L
Position	7	8	7	8	10	11	8	8	9	12	10	12	12	11	12	12	12	12	14	14	13	13	13	14	13	13	12	13	14	14

Source: J.LEAGUE OFFICIAL GUIDE 1997. ISBN 4-09-102329-0.
A = Away; H = Home; W = Win; D = Draw; L = Loss

== Competitions ==
Competitions	Position
J.League	14th / 16 clubs
Emperor's Cup	Runners-up
J.League Cup	GL-A 3rd / 8 clubs

== Domestic results ==
=== J.League ===
16 March 1996 1	JEF United Ichihara	0–1	Sanfrecce Hiroshima	Ichihara Stadium
17:04 JST (UTC+09)		J. League	Huistra 60'	Attendance: 10,722; Referee: Keiichi Sunakawa; Assistant referees: Takashi Kunori, Kenichi Koshiyama; Fourth official: Terunobu Kakinuma

20 March 1996 2	Sanfrecce Hiroshima	1–2 (V-goal) (a.e.t.)	Kashima Antlers	Hiroshima Big Arch
16:05 JST (UTC+09)	Takagi 46'	J. League	Leonardo 73'; Hasegawa 117'	Attendance: 18,863; Referee: Fumikazu Shioyazono; Assistant referees: Takayoshi Kashino, Kazuhiko Matsumura; Fourth official: Kōji Ueno

23 March 1996 3	Cerezo Osaka	1–2 (V-goal) (a.e.t.)	Sanfrecce Hiroshima	Osaka Nagai No.2 Stadium
15:01 JST (UTC+09)	Morishima 13'	J. League	Yoshida 26'; Takagi 96'	Attendance: 6,276; Referee: Zoran Petrović; Assistant referees: Akio Okutani, Hiroyuki Ōnishi; Fourth official: Tsuyoshi Miyake

30 March 1996 4	Sanfrecce Hiroshima	0–1 (V-goal) (a.e.t.)	Yokohama Flügels	Hiroshima Big Arch
15:04 JST (UTC+09)		J. League	Sampaio 103'	Attendance: 7,105; Referee: Tatsumi Ōno; Assistant referees: Yoshikazu Hiroshima, Kō Ōishi; Fourth official: Mamoru Ueda

3 April 1996 5	Shimizu S-Pulse	1–0 (V-goal) (a.e.t.)	Sanfrecce Hiroshima	Nihondaira Sports Stadium
19:01 JST (UTC+09)	Massaro 116'	J. League		Attendance: 12,363; Referee: Kenji Tanaka; Assistant referees: Yasushi Tsuchimoto, Takashi Aoki; Fourth official: Toshiyuki Asanuma

6 April 1996 6	Gamba Osaka	2–1 (V-goal) (a.e.t.)	Sanfrecce Hiroshima	Expo '70 Commemorative Stadium
15:00 JST (UTC+09)	Mladenović 73'; Matsunami 98'	J. League	Noh 81'	Attendance: 7,042; Referee: Yasuhiro Hemmi; Assistant referees: Morihisa Yamaguchi, Akio Okutani; Fourth official: Tamotsu Ōnishi

13 April 1996 7	Sanfrecce Hiroshima	3–0	Kyoto Purple Sanga	Hiroshima Big Arch
14:02 JST (UTC+09)	Noh 74', 76'; Takagi 89'	J. League		Attendance: 7,098; Referee: Zoran Petrović; Assistant referees: Tetsu Karakida, Satoru Kawano; Fourth official: Masahiro Katsuyama

17 April 1996 8	Bellmare Hiratsuka	0–1 (V-goal) (a.e.t.)	Sanfrecce Hiroshima	Hiratsuka Stadium
19:03 JST (UTC+09)		J. League	Uemura 101'	Attendance: 5,747; Referee: Hiroshi Tanabe; Assistant referees: Mitsuru Satō, Takao Onshi; Fourth official: Masaki Yoshihara

20 April 1996 9	Sanfrecce Hiroshima	0–1	Kashiwa Reysol	Hiroshima Big Arch
15:03 JST (UTC+09)		J. League	Yokoyama 11'	Attendance: 7,126; Referee: Yasuhiro Hemmi; Assistant referees: Yoshikazu Hiroshima, Hiroyuki Ōnishi; Fourth official: Shinya Sasamoto

27 April 1996 10	Sanfrecce Hiroshima	0–3	Yokohama Marinos	Hiroshima Big Arch
14:35 JST (UTC+09)		J. League	Gorosito 58'; Noda 60'; Miura 85'	Attendance: 12,453; Referee: Piotr Werner; Assistant referees: Morihisa Yamaguchi, Takashi Aoki; Fourth official: Kazuyuki Tanimoto

1 May 1996 11	Avispa Fukuoka	0–2	Sanfrecce Hiroshima	Kumamoto Suizenji Stadium
19:00 JST (UTC+09)		J. League	Huistra 47'; Moriyasu 82'	Attendance: 7,895; Referee: Archundia; Assistant referees: Tōru Yamashiro, Takayoshi Kashino; Fourth official: Kōji Uehara

4 May 1996 12	Júbilo Iwata	1–0	Sanfrecce Hiroshima	Júbilo Iwata Stadium
14:00 JST (UTC+09)	Vanenburg 24'	J. League		Attendance: 16,639; Referee: Masayoshi Okada; Assistant referees: Takashi Kunori, Satoru Kawano; Fourth official: Tōru Nagata

11 May 1996 13	Sanfrecce Hiroshima	1–3	Urawa Red Diamonds	Hiroshima Big Arch
15:02 JST (UTC+09)	Uemura 44'	J. League	Hori 39', 48'; Fukuda 71'	Attendance: 9,681; Referee: Zoran Petrović; Assistant referees: Naoki Esumi, Kazuhiko Matsumura; Fourth official: Hitoshi Yamada

15 May 1996 14	Nagoya Grampus Eight	1–2	Sanfrecce Hiroshima	Nagoya Mizuho Athletics Stadium
19:03 JST (UTC+09)	Stojković 64'	J. League	Huistra 69'; Takagi 80'	Attendance: 21,303; Referee: Shinichirō Obata; Assistant referees: Kazuya Yanagisawa, Ichirō Inukai; Fourth official: Yasuhiro Takeichi

18 May 1996 15	Sanfrecce Hiroshima	1–3	Verdy Kawasaki	Hiroshima Big Arch
15:02 JST (UTC+09)	Takagi 89'	J. League	Donizete 1'; Gen 31'; K. Miura 32'	Attendance: 12,124; Referee: Archundia; Assistant referees: Noboru Ishiyama, Satoru Kawano; Fourth official: Norio Kuriyama

28 August 1996 16	Sanfrecce Hiroshima	0–3	Júbilo Iwata	Hiroshima Big Arch
19:00 JST (UTC+09)		J. League	Dunga 0', 61'; Nakayama 41'	Attendance: 6,585; Referee: Bemard Saules; Assistant referees: Morihisa Yamaguchi, Hiroyuki Ōnishi; Fourth official: Hideki Tanigawa

31 August 1996 17	Urawa Red Diamonds	5–1	Sanfrecce Hiroshima	Urawa Komaba Stadium
19:04 JST (UTC+09)	Hori 28'; Bein 30'; Yamada 36', 38'; Okano 44'	J. League	Takagi 81'	Attendance: 20,028; Referee: Hideo Kikuchi; Assistant referees: Takashi Kunori, Keiji Kamiara; Fourth official: Shigeru Kimura

7 September 1996 18	Sanfrecce Hiroshima	2–3	Nagoya Grampus Eight	Hiroshima Big Arch
18:33 JST (UTC+09)	Takagi 12'; Fue 67'	J. League	Okayama 44'; Moriyama 70'; Stojković 72'	Attendance: 10,185; Referee: Hiroshi Tanabe; Assistant referees: Akio Okutani, Takashi Aoki; Fourth official: Keiichi Nadamoto

14 September 1996 19	Verdy Kawasaki	5–1	Sanfrecce Hiroshima	Tecnoport Fukui Stadium
18:00 JST (UTC+09)	1' (o.g.); K. Miura 15', 34'; Magrão 46', 75'	J. League	Noh 32'	Attendance: 11,782; Referee: Hiroyuki Umemoto; Assistant referees: Naoki Esumi, Hitoshi Nakagomi; Fourth official: Masao Nakajō

21 September 1996 20	Sanfrecce Hiroshima	3–4	JEF United Ichihara	Tottori Stadium
18:30 JST (UTC+09)	Takagi 25', 33', 66'	J. League	Jō 7'; Rufer 10', 58'; Hašek 82'	Attendance: 7,389; Referee: Yasuhiro Hemmi; Assistant referees: Yoshikazu Hiroshima, Sōichirō Kaneko; Fourth official: Tomohiro Takagaki

28 September 1996 21	Kashima Antlers	1–1 (V-goal) (a.e.t.) (8–9 p)	Sanfrecce Hiroshima	Kashima Soccer Stadium
15:04 JST (UTC+09)	Masuda 33'	J. League	Huistra 72'	Attendance: 15,975; Referee: Masayoshi Okada; Assistant referees: Noboru Ishiyama, Satoru Kawano; Fourth official: Michio Horie
	Penalties
	(penalty scored) Jorginho; (penalty scored) Hasegawa; (penalty scored) Oniki; (penalty missed) Manaka; (penalty scored) Rodrigo; (penalty scored) Akita; (penalty scored) Sōma; (penalty scored) Okuno; (penalty missed) Naitō; (penalty scored) Kumagai; (penalty missed) Furukawa		(penalty scored) Takagi; (penalty scored) Moriyasu; (penalty scored) Yoshida; (penalty scored) Kuwabara; (penalty missed) Huistra; (penalty scored) Kubo; (penalty scored) Yanagimoto; (penalty scored) Michiki; (penalty missed) Naitō; (penalty scored) Satō; (penalty scored) Maekawa

2 October 1996 22	Sanfrecce Hiroshima	2–1 (V-goal) (a.e.t.)	Cerezo Osaka	Hiroshima Stadium
19:00 JST (UTC+09)	Kubo 78' 90'	J. League	72' (o.g.)	Attendance: 5,387; Referee: Hiroshi Tanabe; Assistant referees: Naoki Esumi, Kazuhiko Matsumura; Fourth official: Kōji Ueno

5 October 1996 23	Yokohama Flügels	2–0	Sanfrecce Hiroshima	Yokohama Mitsuzawa Football Stadium
18:33 JST (UTC+09)	Evair 16', 39'	J. League		Attendance: 7,111; Referee: Naotsugu Fuse; Assistant referees: Mitsuru Satō, Keiji Kamiara; Fourth official: Masaki Yoshihara

16 October 1996 24	Sanfrecce Hiroshima	2–3	Shimizu S-Pulse	Kagoshima Kamoike Stadium
19:03 JST (UTC+09)	Michiki 19', 26'	J. League	Nagai 66'; Hasegawa 86', 89'	Attendance: 6,314; Referee: Fumikazu Shioyazono; Assistant referees: Yoshikazu Hiroshima, Masatoshi Shibata; Fourth official: Sadaaki Hagiwara

19 October 1996 25	Sanfrecce Hiroshima	2–0	Gamba Osaka	Ehime Matsuyama Athletic Stadium
18:34 JST (UTC+09)	Noh 51'; Huistra 56'	J. League		Attendance: 7,202; Referee: Kazuo Kakihana; Assistant referees: Satoru Kawano, Tōru Yamashiro; Fourth official: Hiroshi Yoshinouchi

26 October 1996 26	Kyoto Purple Sanga	2–1 (V-goal) (a.e.t.)	Sanfrecce Hiroshima	Kyoto Nishikyogoku Stadium
15:05 JST (UTC+09)	Edmílson 16'; Noguchi 108'	J. League	Huistra 25'	Attendance: 7,315; Referee: Leslie Mottram; Assistant referees: Akio Okutani, Kōji Minami; Fourth official: Hiroyuki Ishida

30 October 1996 27	Sanfrecce Hiroshima	3–2	Bellmare Hiratsuka	Hiroshima Stadium
19:01 JST (UTC+09)	Takagi 11'; Huistra 30'; Kojima 52'	J. League	Takada 19'; Noguchi 86'	Attendance: 5,037; Referee: Tatsumi Ōno; Assistant referees: Hideaki Harada, Hiroyuki Ōnishi; Fourth official: Kuniyasu Doi

2 November 1996 28	Kashiwa Reysol	3–0	Sanfrecce Hiroshima	Hitachi Kashiwa Soccer Stadium
14:59 JST (UTC+09)	Valdir 37'; Edílson 57', 83'	J. League		Attendance: 7,035; Referee: Naotsugu Fuse; Assistant referees: Kazuaki Hamaguchi, Masahiro Katagiri; Fourth official: Kōji Sugikawa

6 November 1996 29	Sanfrecce Hiroshima	2–4	Avispa Fukuoka	Hiroshima Big Arch
19:03 JST (UTC+09)	Moriyasu 53', 88'	J. League	Yamashita 30'; Mayor 48'; Ueno 66', 79'	Attendance: 4,491; Referee: Bemard Saules; Assistant referees: Hiroyuki Izumi, Takashi Aoki; Fourth official: Norio Kuriyama

9 November 1996 30	Yokohama Marinos	3–1	Sanfrecce Hiroshima	Yokohama Mitsuzawa Football Stadium
14:30 JST (UTC+09)	Omura 19', 50', 89'	J. League	12' (o.g.)	Attendance: 10,858; Referee: Hiroyuki Umemoto; Assistant referees: Kazuaki Hamaguchi, Takuji Fukazawa; Fourth official: Masahiko Takahashi

=== Emperor's Cup ===
1st Round	bye

2nd Round	bye

17 November 1996 3rd Round	Sanfrecce Hiroshima	2–0	Brummell Sendai	Hiroshima Stadium
: JST (UTC+09)	? ?' ? ?'

23 December 1996 4th Round	Kashiwa Reysol	1–2	Sanfrecce Hiroshima	Hiroshima Stadium
: JST (UTC+09)	? ?'		? ?' ? ?'

26 December 1996 Quarterfinals	Sanfrecce Hiroshima	3–0	Shimizu S-Pulse	Kobe Universiade Memorial Stadium
: JST (UTC+09)	? ?' ? ?' ? ?'

29 December 1996 Semifinals	Gamba Osaka	0–2	Sanfrecce Hiroshima	Expo '70 Commemorative Stadium
: JST (UTC+09)			? ?' ? ?'

1 January 1997 Final	Sanfrecce Hiroshima	0–3	Verdy Kawasaki	Tokyo National Stadium
: JST (UTC+09)			Kitazawa ?'; Y. Miura ?'; Kurihara ?'	Attendance: 38,737

=== J.League Cup ===
1 June 1996 GL-A-1-1	Sanfrecce Hiroshima	1–0	Júbilo Iwata	Hiroshima Big Arch
17:31 JST (UTC+09)	Huistra 57'	J. League		Attendance: 11,468; Referee: Yasuhiro Hemmi; Assistant referees: Naoki Esumi, Masatoshi Shibata; Fourth official: Keiichi Nadamoto

5 June 1996 GL-A-1-2	Júbilo Iwata	1–0 (1–1 agg.)	Sanfrecce Hiroshima	Júbilo Iwata Stadium
19:02 JST (UTC+09)	Nakayama 41'	J. League		Attendance: 8,354; Referee: Piotr Werner; Assistant referees: Yasushi Tsuchimoto, Tetsu Karakida; Fourth official: Takuya Okada

8 June 1996 GL-A-2-1	Kyoto Purple Sanga	0–1	Sanfrecce Hiroshima	Kumamoto Suizenji Stadium
18:34 JST (UTC+09)		J. League	Abe 29'	Attendance: 6,827; Referee: Kiyoshi Ōta; Assistant referees: Kazuya Yanagisawa, Tōru Yamashiro; Fourth official: Kōji Uehara

12 June 1996 GL-A-2-2	Sanfrecce Hiroshima	0–0 (1–0 agg.)	Kyoto Purple Sanga	Hiroshima Big Arch
19:04 JST (UTC+09)		J. League		Attendance: 4,331; Referee: Tatsumi Ōno; Assistant referees: Hiroyuki Izumi, Hiroyuki Ōnishi; Fourth official: Kōsō Sumida

15 June 1996 GL-A-3-1	Sanfrecce Hiroshima	1–1	Gamba Osaka	Oita Athletic Stadium
18:31 JST (UTC+09)	Kubo 84'	J. League	Matsuyama 21'	Attendance: 4,105; Referee: Zoran Petrović; Assistant referees: Noboru Ishiyama, Masatoshi Shibata; Fourth official: Tsunenori Nagamatsu

19 June 1996 GL-A-3-2	Gamba Osaka	0–3 (1–4 agg.)	Sanfrecce Hiroshima	Expo '70 Commemorative Stadium
19:00 JST (UTC+09)		J. League	Moriyasu 37'; Kubo 47'; Michiki 50'	Attendance: 5,074; Referee: Yasuhiro Matsuzaki; Assistant referees: Satoru Ishizawa, Takayoshi Kashino; Fourth official: Tamotsu Ōnishi

22 June 1996 GL-A-4-1	Kashiwa Reysol	1–2	Sanfrecce Hiroshima	Hitachi Kashiwa Soccer Stadium
18:30 JST (UTC+09)	29' (o.g.)	J. League	Huistra 21'; Kuwabara 68'	Attendance: 8,003; Referee: Piotr Werner; Assistant referees: Morihisa Yamaguchi, Takashi Aoki; Fourth official: Yoshiyuki Yamashita

26 June 1996 GL-A-4-2	Sanfrecce Hiroshima	1–3 (3–4 agg.)	Kashiwa Reysol	Hiroshima Stadium
19:00 JST (UTC+09)	Ōki 2'	J. League	Careca 39', 44'; Shimotaira 50'	Attendance: 4,603; Referee: Hiroshi Tanabe; Assistant referees: Naoki Esumi, Masatoshi Shibata; Fourth official: Yutaka Miyake

29 June 1996 GL-A-5-1	Sanfrecce Hiroshima	2–3	Bellmare Hiratsuka	Hiroshima Big Arch
18:31 JST (UTC+09)	Kubo 33'; Huistra 58'	J. League	Paulinho 19'; Seki 81', 89'	Attendance: 7,470; Referee: Hiroyuki Umemoto; Assistant referees: Akio Okutani, Takuji Fukazawa; Fourth official: Kuniyasu Doi

3 July 1996 GL-A-5-2	Bellmare Hiratsuka	3–0 (6–2 agg.)	Sanfrecce Hiroshima	Hiratsuka Stadium
19:01 JST (UTC+09)	Seki 15', 51'; Paulinho 83'	J. League		Attendance: 7,178; Referee: Piotr Werner; Assistant referees: Hiroshi Fukuda, Susumu Takeda; Fourth official: Hiroshi Yamaguchi

10 August 1996 GL-A-6-1	Sanfrecce Hiroshima	2–3	Urawa Red Diamonds	Hiroshima Big Arch
18:32 JST (UTC+09)	Santos 5', 39'	J. League	Bein 17'; Fukunaga 52'; 59' (o.g.)	Attendance: 9,271; Referee: Shinichirō Obata; Assistant referees: Tōru Yamashiro, Hiroyuki Ōnishi; Fourth official: Katsuya Motoyasu

14 August 1996 GL-A-6-2	Urawa Red Diamonds	0–2 (3–4 agg.)	Sanfrecce Hiroshima	Urawa Komaba Stadium
19:00 JST (UTC+09)		J. League	Santos 25', 77'	Attendance: 19,386; Referee: Hiroshi Tanabe; Assistant referees: Yū Nakamura, Kōji Minami; Fourth official: Toshimitsu Yasumoto

17 August 1996 GL-A-7-1	Yokohama Marinos	3–5	Sanfrecce Hiroshima	Yokohama Mitsuzawa Football Stadium
19:00 JST (UTC+09)	Omura 10'; T. Yamada 74'; Acosta 89'	J. League	Santos 16', 85'; Takagi 30'; Huistra 65'; Kubo 80'	Attendance: 10,407; Referee: Yoshimi Ogawa; Assistant referees: Toshimitsu Yoshida, Susumu Takeda; Fourth official: Mineo Takada

21 August 1996 GL-A-7-2	Sanfrecce Hiroshima	2–2 (7–5 agg.)	Yokohama Marinos	Hiroshima Big Arch
19:01 JST (UTC+09)	Huistra 44'; Moriyasu 51'	J. League	Acosta 18', 22'	Attendance: 8,250; Referee: Tōru Kamikawa; Assistant referees: Kazuya Yanagisawa, Hiroyuki Izumi; Fourth official: Kōji Hanaguchi

== Player statistics ==
Pos.	Nat.	Player	D.o.B. (Age)	Height / Weight	J.League		Emperor's Cup		J.League Cup		Total	
Pos.	Nat.	Player	D.o.B. (Age)	Height / Weight	Apps	Goals	Apps	Goals	Apps	Goals	Apps	Goals
DF	(Japan)	Yasuyuki Satō	April 12, 1966 (aged 29)	176 cm / 67 kg	13	0	2	0	8	0	23	0
FW	(Netherlands)	Huistra	January 18, 1967 (aged 29)	182 cm / 71 kg	28	7	0	0	14	5	42	12
FW	(Japan)	Takuya Takagi	November 12, 1967 (aged 28)	188 cm / 82 kg	30	11	5	2	6	1	41	14
GK	(Japan)	Kazuya Maekawa	March 22, 1968 (aged 27)	188 cm / 84 kg	25	0	5	0	14	0	44	0
DF	(Japan)	Naoki Naitō	May 30, 1968 (aged 27)	180 cm / 78 kg	26	0	5	0	13	0	44	0
MF	(Japan)	Mitsuaki Kojima	July 14, 1968 (aged 27)	173 cm / 70 kg	26	1	5	0	14	0	45	1
MF	(Japan)	Hajime Moriyasu	August 23, 1968 (aged 27)	173 cm / 62 kg	26	3	5	0	14	2	45	5
MF	(Japan)	Yasuhiro Yoshida	July 14, 1969 (aged 26)	172 cm / 70 kg	27	1	5	1	10	0	42	2
GK	(Japan)	Kazumasa Kawano	November 7, 1970 (aged 25)	185 cm / 80 kg	4	0	0	0	0	0	4	0
FW	(South Korea)	Noh Jung-Yoon	March 28, 1971 (aged 24)	172 cm / 68 kg	24	5	5	2	4	0	33	7
MF	(Japan)	Hiroyoshi Kuwabara	October 2, 1971 (aged 24)	177 cm / 71 kg	24	0	5	0	8	1	37	1
MF	(Japan)	Takashi Ōnishi	October 16, 1971 (aged 24)	177 cm / 70 kg	0	0		0	0	0		0
DF	(Japan)	Hiroshige Yanagimoto	October 15, 1972 (aged 23)	173 cm / 64 kg	29	0	5	1	14	0	48	1
DF	(Japan)	Hideaki Mori	October 16, 1972 (aged 23)	183 cm / 73 kg	0	0	0	0	0	0	0	0
MF	(Japan)	Hideaki Hagino	January 20, 1973 (aged 23)	173 cm / 66 kg	0	0		0	0	0		0
FW	(Japan)	Masato Fue	February 22, 1973 (aged 23)	174 cm / 65 kg	22	1	1	0	10	0	33	1
MF	(Japan)	Ryūji Michiki	August 25, 1973 (aged 22)	174 cm / 64 kg	17	2	5	0	8	1	30	3
DF	(Japan)	Kenichi Uemura	April 22, 1974 (aged 21)	180 cm / 70 kg	12	2	0	0	7	0	19	2
MF	(Japan)	Yūta Abe	July 31, 1974 (aged 21)	177 cm / 69 kg	3	0	3	0	6	1	12	1
GK	(Japan)	Takashi Shimoda	November 28, 1975 (aged 20)	183 cm / 74 kg	1	0	0	0	0	0	1	0
FW	(Japan)	Susumu Ōki	February 23, 1976 (aged 20)	177 cm / 75 kg	7	0	0	0	4	1	11	1
MF	(Japan)	Kōji Yoshimura	April 13, 1976 (aged 19)	177 cm / 68 kg	0	0		0	0	0		0
MF	(Japan)	Tatsuhiko Kubo	June 18, 1976 (aged 19)	181 cm / 71 kg	22	2	3	0	10	4	35	6
FW	(Japan)	Iwao Yamane	July 31, 1976 (aged 19)	170 cm / 62 kg	0	0		0	0	0		0
GK	(Japan)	Masato Tamada	August 25, 1976 (aged 19)	185 cm / 80 kg	0	0		0	0	0		0
MF	(Japan)	Tsukimitsu Mizuta	September 13, 1976 (aged 19)	174 cm / 71 kg	0	0		0	0	0		0
DF	(Japan)	Takashi Kageyama	May 27, 1977 (aged 18)	180 cm / 67 kg	4	0	0	0	0	0	4	0
MF	(Japan)	Keita Kanemoto	July 13, 1977 (aged 18)	173 cm / 71 kg	0	0		0	0	0		0
MF	(Japan)	Kōta Hattori	November 22, 1977 (aged 18)	175 cm / 71 kg	1	0	0	0	0	0	1	0
FW	(Japan)	Jun Takata	December 6, 1977 (aged 18)	179 cm / 71 kg	0	0		0	0	0		0
GK	(Japan)	Minoru Ueda †	June 20, 1977 (aged 18)	-cm / -kg	0	0		0	0	0		0
GK	(Japan)	Tetsuharu Yamaguchi †	September 8, 1977 (aged 18)	-cm / -kg	0	0		0	0	0		0
MF	(Japan)	Shoji Akimitsu †	May 7, 1977 (aged 18)	-cm / -kg	0	0		0	0	0		0
FW	(Japan)	Kazuyoshi Matsunaga †	November 13, 1977 (aged 18)	-cm / -kg	0	0		0	0	0		0
MF	(Brazil)	Santos †	June 8, 1964 (aged 31)	-cm / -kg	2	0	4	3	7	6	13	9

- † player(s) joined the team after the opening of this season.

== Transfers ==
In:

No.	Pos.	Nation	Player
—	DF	JPN	Naoki Naitō (from Shimizu S-Pulse)
—	DF	JPN	Takashi Kageyama (from Daisho Gakuen High School)
—	MF	JPN	Yasuhiro Yoshida (from Shimizu S-Pulse)
—	MF	JPN	Keita Kanemoto (from Hiroshima Minami High School)
—	MF	JPN	Kōta Hattori (from Makuhari Senior High School)
—	FW	JPN	Jun Takata (from Sanfrecce Hiroshima youth)

Out:

No.	Pos.	Nation	Player
—	GK	JPN	Toshikazu Katō
—	DF	JPN	Yoshirō Moriyama (to Yokohama Flügels)
—	DF	JPN	Masayuki Ōmori
—	MF	JPN	Yahiro Kazama
—	MF	JPN	Akinobu Yokouchi (retired)
—	MF	BRA	Andrey
—	MF	JPN	Yasumasa Makino (to Fujitsu)
—	MF	JPN	Kazutoshi Miura
—	FW	CZE	Hašek (to JEF United Ichihara)
—	FW	JPN	Takumi Shima (retired)
—	FW	JPN	Kenji Wakamatsu
—	FW	JPN	Yoshihiro Nishida (to Kyoto Purple Sanga)
—	FW	NED	Van Loen

== Transfers during the season ==
=== In ===
- (Brazil) Santos (from Veracruz on June)
- (Japan) Minoru Ueda
- (Japan) Tetsuharu Yamaguchi (from Isahaya Commercial High School)
- (Japan) Shoji Akimitsu
- (Japan) Kazuyoshi Matsunaga (from Nakatsu Kogyo High School)

=== Out ===
- (Japan) Hideaki Mori (to Avispa Fukuoka)

== Awards ==
none

== Other pages ==
- (in Japanese) J. League official site
- (in Japanese) Sanfrecce Hiroshima official site
