= Masato Fue =

Japanese footballer and manager

Masato Fue 笛 真人
Personal information
- Full name: Masato Fue
- Date of birth: March 22, 1973 (age 53)
- Place of birth: Kagoshima, Japan
- Height: 1.74 m (5 ft 8 1/2 in)
- Position: Forward

Youth career
- 1988–1990: Kagoshima Jitsugyo High School

Senior career*
Years	Team	Apps	(Gls)
1991–1998	Sanfrecce Hiroshima	93	(5)
2001–2002	Profesor Miyazaki		

Managerial career
- 2001–2002: Profesor Miyazaki
Medal record
Sanfrecce Hiroshima
Runner-up	J1 League	1994
Runner-up	Emperor's Cup	1995
Runner-up	Emperor's Cup	1996
- * Club domestic league appearances and goals

Masato Fue (笛 真人, Fue Masato; born February 22, 1973) is a Japanese former football player and manager.

== Playing career ==
Fue was born in Kagoshima Prefecture on February 22, 1973. After graduating from high school, he joined Mazda (later Sanfrecce Hiroshima) in 1991. He played many matches as a forward and offensive midfielder from 1994. The club won second place in the 1994 J1 League and 1995 Emperor's Cup. However, he could hardly play in the match in 1998 and retiredat the end of the v1998 season. In 2001, he joined the Regional Leagues club Profesor Miyazaki and he came back as playing manager. The club was promoted to the Japan Football League in 2002. He retired at the end of the 2002 season.

== Club statistics ==
Appearances and goals by club, season and competition
Club	Season	League			Emperor's Cup		J.League Cup		Total	
Club	Season	Division	Apps	Goals	Apps	Goals	Apps	Goals	Apps	Goals
Mazda	1991–92	JSL Division 1	0	0	0	0	0	0	0	0
Sanfrecce Hiroshima	1992	J1 League	-		2	1	4	1	6	2
Sanfrecce Hiroshima	1993	J1 League	2	0	2	0	0	0	4	0
Sanfrecce Hiroshima	1994	J1 League	13	1	2	0	0	0	15	1
Sanfrecce Hiroshima	1995	J1 League	33	2	5	0	-		38	2
Sanfrecce Hiroshima	1996	J1 League	22	1	1	0	10	0	33	1
Sanfrecce Hiroshima	1997	J1 League	22	1	2	0	6	0	30	0
Sanfrecce Hiroshima	1998	J1 League	1	0	0	0	3	0	4	0
Total			93	5	14	1	23	1	130	7
