= Keita Kanemoto =

Japanese footballer

Keita Kanemoto 金本 圭太
Personal information
- Full name: Keita Kanemoto
- Date of birth: July 13, 1977 (age 49)
- Place of birth: Hiroshima, Japan
- Height: 1.73 m (5 ft 8 in)
- Position: Midfielder

Youth career
- 1993–1995: Hiroshima Minami High School

Senior career*
Years	Team	Apps	(Gls)
1996–1998	Sanfrecce Hiroshima	11	(0)
1999–2003	Oita Trinita	90	(0)
Total		101	(0)
Medal record
Sanfrecce Hiroshima
Runner-up	Emperor's Cup	1996
- * Club domestic league appearances and goals

Keita Kanemoto (金本 圭太, Kanemoto Keita; born July 13, 1977) is a former Japanese football player.

== Playing career ==
Kanemoto was born in Hiroshima Prefecture on July 13, 1977. After graduating from high school, he joined his local club, Sanfrecce Hiroshima, in 1996. He played as defensive midfielder in 1997; however, he did not play very often. In 1999, he moved to the newly promoted J2 League club, Oita Trinita. He played in many matches as a defensive midfielder. The club won the championship in 2002 and was promoted to the J1 League in 2003. However he played less and less often in 2003 and he retired at the end of the 2003 season.

== Career statistics ==
Appearances and goals by club, season and competition
Club	Season	League			Emperor's Cup		J.League Cup		Total	
Club	Season	Division	Apps	Goals	Apps	Goals	Apps	Goals	Apps	Goals
Sanfrecce Hiroshima	1996	J1 League	0	0	0	0	0	0	0	0
Sanfrecce Hiroshima	1997	J1 League	8	0	1	0	2	0	11	0
Sanfrecce Hiroshima	1998	J1 League	3	0	0	0	2	0	5	0
Oita Trinita	1999	J2 League	29	0	3	1	4	0	36	1
Oita Trinita	2000	J2 League	13	0	2	0	0	0	15	0
Oita Trinita	2001	J2 League	13	0	2	0	2	0	17	0
Oita Trinita	2002	J2 League	27	0	1	0	—		28	0
Oita Trinita	2003	J1 League	8	0	0	0	1	0	9	0
Career total			101	0	10	1	15	0	121	1
