= Takashi Onishi =

Japanese footballer

Takashi Onishi 大西 貴
Personal information
- Full name: Takashi Onishi
- Date of birth: October 16, 1971 (age 55)
- Place of birth: Ehime, Japan
- Height: 1.78 m (5 ft 10 in)
- Position: Defender

Youth career
- 1987–1989: Minamiuwa High School
- 1990–1993: Fukuoka University

Senior career*
Years	Team	Apps	(Gls)
1994–1996	Sanfrecce Hiroshima	17	(0)
1997	Kyoto Purple Sanga	4	(0)
1998–2002	Ehime FC		

Managerial career
- 2001–2004: Ehime FC
Medal record
Sanfrecce Hiroshima
Runner-up	J1 League	1994
Runner-up	Emperor's Cup	1995
Runner-up	Emperor's Cup	1996
- * Club domestic league appearances and goals

Takashi Onishi (大西 貴, Onishi Takashi; born October 16, 1971) is a former Japanese football player.

== Playing career ==
Onishi was born in Ehime Prefecture on October 16, 1971. After graduating from Fukuoka University, he joined Sanfrecce Hiroshima in 1994. Although he debuted and played many matches in 1995, he could not play at all in 1996. In 1997, he moved to Kyoto Purple Sanga. In 1998, he moved to his local club Ehime FC in Regional Leagues. The club was promoted to Japan Football League from 2001. From 2001, he also served as manager. He retired at the end of the 2002 season.

== Coaching career ==
In 2001, when Onishi played for Ehime FC, he became a playing manager. He managed the club until 2004.

== Career statistics ==
Appearances and goals by club, season and competition
Club	Season	League			Emperor's Cup		J.League Cup		Total	
Club	Season	Division	Apps	Goals	Apps	Goals	Apps	Goals	Apps	Goals
Sanfrecce Hiroshima	1994	J1 League	0	0	0	0	0	0	0	0
Sanfrecce Hiroshima	1995	J1 League	17	0	0	0	-		17	0
Sanfrecce Hiroshima	1996	J1 League	0	0	0	0	0	0	0	0
Kyoto Purple Sanga	1997	J1 League	4	0	0	0	0	0	4	0
Ehime FC	1998	Regional Leagues			-		-		0	0
Ehime FC	1999	Regional Leagues			1	0	-		1	0
Ehime FC	2000	Regional Leagues			1	0	-		1	0
Ehime FC	2001	Football League	15	0	2	0	-		17	0
Ehime FC	2002	Football League	7	0	2	0	-		9	0
Career total			43	0	7	0	0	0	50	0
