= Kazuyoshi Matsunaga =

Japanese footballer (born 1977)

Kazuyoshi Matsunaga 松永 一慶
Personal information
- Full name: Kazuyoshi Matsunaga
- Date of birth: November 13, 1977 (age 48)
- Place of birth: Nakatsu, Oita, Japan
- Height: 1.90 m (6 ft 3 in)
- Position: Forward

Youth career
- 1993–1995: Nakatsu Technical High School

Senior career*
Years	Team	Apps	(Gls)
1996–1999	Sanfrecce Hiroshima	11	(2)
2000	Avispa Fukuoka	3	(2)
2001	Profesor Miyazaki		
2002	Jurong		
2002	Profesor Miyazaki	12	(2)
2003–2004	Tochigi SC	48	(14)
2005	ALO's Hokuriku	2	(0)
2006	Banditonce Kobe	7	(3)
2007–2008	Mitsubishi Mizushima	27	(3)
Total		110	(26)
Medal record
Sanfrecce Hiroshima
Runner-up	Emperor's Cup	1996
Runner-up	Emperor's Cup	1999
- * Club domestic league appearances and goals

Kazuyoshi Matsunaga (松永 一慶, Matsunaga Kazuyoshi; born November 13, 1977) is a former Japanese football player.

== Playing career ==
Matsunaga was born in Nakatsu on November 13, 1977. After graduating from high school, he joined J1 League club Sanfrecce Hiroshima in 1996. Although he played several matches as forward, he could not play many matches. In 2000, he moved to Avispa Fukuoka. However he could hardly play in the match. In 2001, he moved to Regional Leagues club Profesor Miyazaki. The club was promoted to Japan Football League (JFL) from 2002. In 2002, he moved to Singapore club Jurong. In 2002, he returned to Profesor Miyazaki. In 2003, he moved to JFL club Tochigi SC. He played as regular player in 2 seasons. In 2005, he moved to JFL club ALO's Hokuriku. However he could hardly play in the match. In 2006, he moved to Regional Leagues club Banditonce Kobe. In 2007, he moved to Mitsubishi Mizushima. He retired end of 2008 season.

== Club statistics ==
Club performance			League		Cup		League Cup		Total	
Season	Club	League	Apps	Goals	Apps	Goals	Apps	Goals	Apps	Goals
Japan			League		Emperor's Cup		J.League Cup		Total	
1996	Sanfrecce Hiroshima	J1 League	0	0	0	0	0	0	0	0
1997	Sanfrecce Hiroshima	J1 League	3	1	2	2	0	0	5	4
1998	Sanfrecce Hiroshima	J1 League	8	1	0	0	1	0	9	1
1999	Sanfrecce Hiroshima	J1 League	0	0	0	0	0	0	0	0
2000	Avispa Fukuoka	J1 League	3	2	0	0	2	1	5	3
2001	Professor Miyazaki	Regional Leagues								
2002	Professor Miyazaki	Football League	12	2	2	0	-		14	2
2003	Tochigi SC	Football League	29	9	1	1	-		30	10
2004	Tochigi SC	Football League	19	5	1	0	-		20	5
2005	ALO's Hokuriku	Football League	2	0	0	0	-		2	0
2006	Banditonce Kobe	Regional Leagues	7	3	0	0	-		7	3
2007	Mitsubishi Mizushima	Football League	14	1	0	0	-		14	1
2008	Mitsubishi Mizushima	Football League	13	2	-		-		13	2
Total			110	26	6	3	3	1	119	30
