= Yuta Abe =

Japanese footballer (born 1974)

Yuta Abe 安部 雄大
Personal information
- Full name: Yuta Abe
- Date of birth: 31 July 1974 (age 52)
- Place of birth: Yamaguchi, Japan
- Height: 1.77 m (5 ft 9 1/2 in)
- Position: Midfielder

Youth career
- 1990–1992: Tatara Gakuen High School

Senior career*
Years	Team	Apps	(Gls)
1993–1997	Sanfrecce Hiroshima	10	(0)
1998–2000	Vissel Kobe	66	(3)
2001	Yamaguchi Teachers		
Total		76	(3)
Medal record
Sanfrecce Hiroshima
Runner-up	J1 League	1994
Runner-up	Emperor's Cup	1995
Runner-up	Emperor's Cup	1996
- * Club domestic league appearances and goals

Yuta Abe (安部 雄大, Abe Yūta; born 31 July 1974) is a former Japanese football player.

== Playing career ==
Abe was born in Yamaguchi on 31 July 1974. After graduating from high school, he joined Sanfrecce Hiroshima in 1993. However he could not play many matches. In 1998, he moved to Vissel Kobe. He played as defensive midfielder and became a regular player. In 2001, he moved to his local club Yamaguchi Teachers in Regional Leagues. He retired end of 2001 season.

== Career statistics ==
Appearances and goals by club, season and competition
Club	Season	League			Emperor's Cup		J.League Cup		Total	
Club	Season	Division	Apps	Goals	Apps	Goals	Apps	Goals	Apps	Goals
Sanfrecce Hiroshima	1993	J1 League	0	0	0	0	2	0	2	0
Sanfrecce Hiroshima	1994	J1 League	1	0	0	0	0	0	1	0
Sanfrecce Hiroshima	1995	J1 League	0	0	0	0	—		0	0
Sanfrecce Hiroshima	1996	J1 League	3	0	3	0	6	1	12	1
Sanfrecce Hiroshima	1997	J1 League	6	0	0	0	0	0	6	0
Vissel Kobe	1998	J1 League	30	2	0	0	3	0	33	2
Vissel Kobe	1999	J1 League	25	1	0	0	2	0	27	1
Vissel Kobe	2000	J1 League	11	0	0	0	0	0	11	0
Career total			76	3	3	0	13	1	92	4
