= Iwao Yamane =

Japanese footballer

Iwao Yamane 山根 巌
Personal information
- Full name: Iwao Yamane
- Date of birth: July 31, 1976 (age 50)
- Place of birth: Hiroshima, Japan
- Height: 1.70 m (5 ft 7 in)
- Position: Midfielder

Youth career
- 1992–1994: Hiroshima Minami High School

Senior career*
| Years | Team | Apps | (Gls) |
| 1995–1998 | Sanfrecce Hiroshima | 37 | (3) |
| 1998–2002 | Oita Trinita | 121 | (12) |
| 2003–2005 | Kawasaki Frontale | 47 | (1) |
| 2006–2009 | Kashiwa Reysol | 93 | (3) |
| 2010–2011 | Zweigen Kanazawa | 44 | (0) |
| Total | | 342 | (19) |
Medal record
Sanfrecce Hiroshima
| Runner-up | Emperor's Cup | 1995 |
| Runner-up | Emperor's Cup | 1996 |
Kashiwa Reysol
| Runner-up | Emperor's Cup | 2008 |
- * Club domestic league appearances and goals

Iwao Yamane (山根 巌, Yamane Iwao; born July 31, 1976) is a former Japanese football player. His son Towa Yamane is also a footballer.

== Playing career ==
Yamane was born in Hiroshima on July 31, 1976. After graduating from high school, he joined J1 League club Sanfrecce Hiroshima in 1995. He played many matches as offensive midfielder in 1997. However his opportunity to play decreased in 1998. In November 1998, he moved to Japan Football League club Oita Trinity (later Oita Trinita). The club was promoted to J2 League from 1999. He also became a regular player as defensive midfielder under manager Nobuhiro Ishizaki. The club finished at 3rd place in 1999 and 2000, and missed promotion to J1 for 2 years in a row. In 2002, although Ishizaki already left the club, the club won the champions and was promoted to J1 from 2003. However he did not play in J1 from 2003, and moved to J2 club Kawasaki Frontale which Ishizaki managed in 2003. In 2003, the club finished at 3rd place and missed promotion to J1 and Ishizaki left the club. In 2004, the club won the champions and was promoted to J1 from 2005. However he could hardly play in the match from 2004 and he left the club end of 2005 season. In 2006, he moved to J2 club Kashiwa Reysol by inviting Ishizaki. He played as regular player under manager Ishizaki and the club was promoted to J1 form 2007. From 2008, although his opportunity to play decreased, the club won the 2nd place 2008 Emperor's Cup. In 2010, he moved to newly was promoted to Japan Football League club, Zweigen Kanazawa. He retired end of 2011 season.

== Club statistics ==
| Club performance | | | League | | Cup | | League Cup | | Total | |
| Season | Club | League | Apps | Goals | Apps | Goals | Apps | Goals | Apps | Goals |
| Japan | | | League | | Emperor's Cup | | J.League Cup | | Total | |
|---|---|---|---|---|---|---|---|---|---|---|
| 1995 | Sanfrecce Hiroshima | J1 League | 6 | 0 | 0 | 0 | - | | 6 | 0 |
| 1996 | Sanfrecce Hiroshima | J1 League | 0 | 0 | 0 | 0 | 0 | 0 | 0 | 0 |
| 1997 | Sanfrecce Hiroshima | J1 League | 20 | 2 | 2 | 0 | 0 | 0 | 22 | 2 |
| 1998 | Sanfrecce Hiroshima | J1 League | 11 | 1 | 0 | 0 | 4 | 0 | 15 | 1 |
| Total | | | 37 | 3 | 2 | 0 | 4 | 0 | 43 | 3 |
| 1998 | Oita Trinity | Football League | 0 | 0 | 3 | 2 | - | | 3 | 2 |
| 1999 | Oita Trinita | J2 League | 32 | 1 | 3 | 0 | 4 | 0 | 39 | 1 |
| 2000 | Oita Trinita | J2 League | 35 | 4 | 0 | 0 | 2 | 0 | 37 | 4 |
| 2001 | Oita Trinita | J2 League | 28 | 3 | 0 | 0 | 1 | 0 | 29 | 3 |
| 2002 | Oita Trinita | J2 League | 26 | 4 | 2 | 0 | - | | 28 | 4 |
| Total | | | 121 | 12 | 5 | 0 | 7 | 0 | 133 | 12 |
| 2003 | Kawasaki Frontale | J2 League | 39 | 1 | 4 | 0 | - | | 43 | 1 |
| 2004 | Kawasaki Frontale | J2 League | 5 | 0 | 0 | 0 | - | | 5 | 0 |
| 2005 | Kawasaki Frontale | J1 League | 3 | 0 | 0 | 0 | 2 | 0 | 5 | 0 |
| Total | | | 47 | 1 | 4 | 0 | 2 | 0 | 53 | 1 |
| 2006 | Kashiwa Reysol | J2 League | 45 | 2 | 0 | 0 | - | | 45 | 2 |
| 2007 | Kashiwa Reysol | J1 League | 21 | 1 | 1 | 0 | 0 | 0 | 22 | 1 |
| 2008 | Kashiwa Reysol | J1 League | 15 | 0 | 3 | 0 | 3 | 0 | 21 | 0 |
| 2009 | Kashiwa Reysol | J1 League | 12 | 0 | 0 | 0 | 2 | 1 | 14 | 1 |
| Total | | | 93 | 3 | 4 | 0 | 5 | 1 | 102 | 4 |
| 2010 | Zweigen Kanazawa | Football League | 21 | 0 | 2 | 0 | - | | 23 | 0 |
| 2011 | Zweigen Kanazawa | Football League | 23 | 0 | 1 | 1 | - | | 24 | 1 |
| Total | | | 44 | 0 | 3 | 1 | - | | 47 | 1 |
| Career total | | | 342 | 19 | 21 | 3 | 18 | 1 | 381 | 23 |
