= Hiroyoshi Kuwabara =

Japanese footballer

Hiroyoshi Kuwabara 桑原 裕義
Personal information
- Full name: Hiroyoshi Kuwabara
- Date of birth: October 2, 1971 (age 55)
- Place of birth: Hiroshima, Japan
- Height: 1.80 m (5 ft 11 in)
- Position: Midfielder

Youth career
- 1987–1989: Hiroshima Technical High School
- 1990–1993: Osaka University of Health and Sport Sciences

Senior career*
Years	Team	Apps	(Gls)
1994–2003	Sanfrecce Hiroshima	229	(0)
2004–2005	Albirex Niigata	46	(1)
2006–2011	Giravanz Kitakyushu	157	(2)
2006	→Fagiano Okayama (loan)	0	(0)
Total		432	(3)
Medal record
Sanfrecce Hiroshima
Runner-up	J1 League	1994
Runner-up	Emperor's Cup	1995
Runner-up	Emperor's Cup	1996
Runner-up	Emperor's Cup	1999
- * Club domestic league appearances and goals

Hiroyoshi Kuwabara (桑原 裕義, Kuwabara Hiroyoshi; born October 2, 1971) is a former Japanese football player.

== Playing career ==
Kuwabara was born in Hiroshima on October 2, 1971. After graduating from Osaka University of Health and Sport Sciences, he joined his local club Sanfrecce Hiroshima in 1994. He became a regular player from 1995 and played many matches for a long time. Although he played many matches as mainly defensive midfielder, he played as many position including central defender. The club won the 2nd place in 1995 and 1996 Emperor's Cup. However his opportunity to play decreased from 2002. In 2004, he moved to newly was promoted to J1 League club, Albirex Niigata. Although he played many matches as defensive midfielder in 2 seasons, he was released for generational change end of 2005 season. In 2006, he moved to Regional Leagues club New Wave Kitakyushu (later Giravanz Kitakyushu). In October 2010, he moved to Fagiano Okayama competing for promotion to Japan Football League (JFL). In 2011, he returned to Kitakyushu. He played as regular player and the club was promoted to JFL in 2008 and J2 League in 2010. He retired end of 2011 season at the age of 40.

== Club statistics ==
Club performance			League		Cup		League Cup		Total	
Season	Club	League	Apps	Goals	Apps	Goals	Apps	Goals	Apps	Goals
Japan			League		Emperor's Cup		J.League Cup		Total	
1994	Sanfrecce Hiroshima	J1 League	0	0	0	0	0	0	0	0
1995	Sanfrecce Hiroshima	J1 League	31	0	5	0	-		36	0
1996	Sanfrecce Hiroshima	J1 League	24	0	5	0	8	1	37	1
1997	Sanfrecce Hiroshima	J1 League	32	0	2	0	5	1	39	1
1998	Sanfrecce Hiroshima	J1 League	28	0	3	0	3	0	34	0
1999	Sanfrecce Hiroshima	J1 League	26	0	5	0	4	0	35	0
2000	Sanfrecce Hiroshima	J1 League	30	0	1	0	4	0	35	0
2001	Sanfrecce Hiroshima	J1 League	28	0	2	0	6	0	36	0
2002	Sanfrecce Hiroshima	J1 League	14	0	4	0	4	0	22	0
2003	Sanfrecce Hiroshima	J2 League	16	0	2	0	-		18	0
Total			229	0	31	0	34	2	294	2
2004	Albirex Niigata	J1 League	24	0	0	0	5	0	29	0
2005	Albirex Niigata	J1 League	22	1	0	0	2	0	24	1
Total			46	1	0	0	7	0	53	1
2006	New Wave Kitakyushu	Regional Leagues	14	0	-		-		14	0
Total			14	0	-		-		14	0
2006	Fagiano Okayama	Regional Leagues	0	0	0	0	-		0	0
Total			0	0	0	0	-		0	0
2007	New Wave Kitakyushu	Regional Leagues	18	0	-		-		18	0
2008	New Wave Kitakyushu	Football League	30	1	2	0	-		32	1
2009	New Wave Kitakyushu	Football League	34	1	1	0	-		35	1
2010	Giravanz Kitakyushu	J2 League	28	0	0	0	-		28	0
2011	Giravanz Kitakyushu	J2 League	33	0	2	0	-		35	0
Total			143	2	5	0	-		148	2
Career total			432	3	34	0	41	2	507	5
