= Yasuyuki Sato =

Japanese footballer

Yasuyuki Sato 佐藤 康之
Personal information
- Full name: Yasuyuki Sato
- Date of birth: 12 April 1966 (age 60)
- Place of birth: Hiroshima, Japan
- Height: 1.77 m (5 ft 9 1/2 in)
- Position: Defender

Youth career
- 1982–1984: Sanyo High School

Senior career*
Years	Team	Apps	(Gls)
1985–1996	Sanfrecce Hiroshima		
1997	Oita Trinity	23	(2)
Medal record
Sanfrecce Hiroshima
Runner-up	J1 League	1994
Runner-up	Emperor's Cup	1987
Runner-up	Emperor's Cup	1995
Runner-up	Emperor's Cup	1996
- * Club domestic league appearances and goals

Yasuyuki Sato (佐藤 康之, Satō Yasuyuki; born 12 April 1966) is a former Japanese football player.

== Playing career ==
Sato was born in Hiroshima on 12 April 1966. After graduating from high school, he joined his local club Mazda (later Sanfrecce Hiroshima) in 1985. He played many matches as center back. The club won the 2nd place in 1987 Emperor's Cup. Although his opportunity to play decreased in early 1990s, he became a regular player again from 1994. The club won the 2nd place in 1994 J1 League and 1995 Emperor's Cup. His opportunity to play decreased in 1996 and he moved to Japan Football League club Oita Trinity in 1997. He retired at the end of 1997 season.

== Club statistics ==
Club performance			League		Cup		League Cup		Total	
Season	Club	League	Apps	Goals	Apps	Goals	Apps	Goals	Apps	Goals
Japan			League		Emperor's Cup		J.League Cup		Total	
1985/86	Mazda	JSL Division 2								
1986/87	Mazda	JSL Division 1	16	0					16	0
1987/88	Mazda	JSL Division 1	21	0			1	0	22	0
1988/89	Mazda	JSL Division 2	17	1			1	0	18	1
1989/90	Mazda	JSL Division 2	15	0			0	0	15	0
1990/91	Mazda	JSL Division 2	28	1			3	0	31	1
1991/92	Mazda	JSL Division 1	9	0			3	0	12	0
1992	Sanfrecce Hiroshima	J1 League	-		2	0	0	0	2	0
1993	Sanfrecce Hiroshima	J1 League	8	0	0	0	4	0	12	0
1994	Sanfrecce Hiroshima	J1 League	37	0	3	0	1	0	41	0
1995	Sanfrecce Hiroshima	J1 League	43	0	2	0	-		45	0
1996	Sanfrecce Hiroshima	J1 League	13	0	2	0	8	0	23	0
1997	Oita Trinity	Football League	23	2			-		23	2
Total			230	4	9	0	21	0	260	4
