= Keisuke Kurihara (footballer) =

Japanese footballer and manager

Keisuke Kurihara 栗原 圭介
Personal information
- Full name: Keisuke Kurihara
- Date of birth: May 20, 1973 (age 53)
- Place of birth: Ota, Tokyo, Japan
- Height: 1.74 m (5 ft 9 in)
- Positions: Midfielder; forward

Youth career
- 1989–1991: Toin Gakuen High School

College career
Years	Team	Apps	(Gls)
1992–1995	Komazawa University		

Senior career*
Years	Team	Apps	(Gls)
1996–1999	Verdy Kawasaki	38	(8)
1998	→Bellmare Hiratsuka (loan)	16	(5)
2000	Sanfrecce Hiroshima	18	(4)
2001–2002	Shonan Bellmare	71	(24)
2003–2004	Albirex Niigata	26	(0)
2005–2008	Vissel Kobe	118	(23)
2009	Tochigi SC	34	(0)
Total		321	(64)

Managerial career
- 2014–2016: Fukushima United FC
Medal record
Verdy Kawasaki
Runner-up	J.League Cup	1996
Winner	Emperor's Cup	1996
- * Club domestic league appearances and goals

Keisuke Kurihara (栗原 圭介, Kurihara Keisuke; born May 20, 1973) is a former Japanese football player and manager.

== Playing career ==
Kurihara was born in Ota, Tokyo on May 20, 1973. After graduating from Komazawa University, he joined the J1 League club Verdy Kawasaki in 1996. He played as a forward during his first season. The club won the championship in the 1996 Emperor's Cup and he scored a goal in the Final. However he did not play much after that and moved to Bellmare Hiratsuka (later Shonan Bellmare) on loan in 1998. At Bellmare, he played often. In 1999, he returned to Verdy and played in many matches. In 2000, he moved to Sanfrecce Hiroshima. In 2001, he moved to the J2 League Shonan Bellmare again and played as a regular player over two seasons. In 2003, he moved to the J2 club Albirex Niigata. At Albirex, he was converted to an offensive midfielder and played as a substitute. The club won the championship in 2003 and was promoted to J1 in 2004. In 2005, he moved to Vissel Kobe. In 2005, he played as a substitute midfielder and the club was relegated to J2 in 2006. He then became a regular player and the club was returned to J1 in a year. In 2009, he moved to the newly promoted J2 League club, Tochigi SC. He retired at the end of the 2009 season.

== Coaching career ==
After retirement, Kurihara started coaching career at Vissel Kobe in 2010. In 2014, he moved to newly was promoted to J3 League club, Fukushima United FC and became a manager. He managed the club in 3 season until 2016.

== Career statistics ==
Appearances and goals by club, season and competition
Club	Season	League			Emperor's Cup		J.League Cup		Total	
Club	Season	Division	Apps	Goals	Apps	Goals	Apps	Goals	Apps	Goals
Verdy Kawasaki	1996	J1 League	7	2	4	2	5	1	16	5
Verdy Kawasaki	1997	J1 League	7	0	0	0	6	1	13	1
Verdy Kawasaki	1998	J1 League	0	0	0	0	4	1	4	1
Bellmare Hiratsuka	1998	J1 League	16	5	2	1	0	0	18	6
Verdy Kawasaki	1999	J1 League	24	6	0	0	3	1	27	7
Sanfrecce Hiroshima	2000	J1 League	18	4	2	2	1	0	21	6
Shonan Bellmare	2001	J2 League	33	17	2	1	2	0	37	18
Shonan Bellmare	2002	J2 League	38	7	1	1	—		39	8
Albirex Niigata	2003	J2 League	15	0	4	0	—		19	0
Albirex Niigata	2004	J1 League	11	0	1	0	4	0	16	0
Vissel Kobe	2005	J1 League	18	4	1	0	5	0	24	4
Vissel Kobe	2006	J2 League	45	12	0	0	—		45	12
Vissel Kobe	2007	J1 League	26	3	1	0	5	1	32	4
Vissel Kobe	2008	J1 League	29	4	2	3	5	2	36	9
Tochigi SC	2009	J2 League	34	0	0	0	—		34	0
Career total			321	64	20	10	42	7	383	81

== Managerial statistics ==
Team	From	To	Record				
Team	From	To	G	W	D	L	Win %
Fukushima United FC	2014	2016	99	29	28	42	29.29
Total			99	29	28	42	29.29
