= Ryuji Michiki =

Japanese footballer

Ryuji Michiki 路木 龍次
Personal information
- Full name: Ryuji Michiki
- Date of birth: 25 August 1973 (age 53)
- Place of birth: Nagasaki, Japan
- Height: 1.78 m (5 ft 10 in)
- Positions: Defender; midfielder

Youth career
- 1989–1991: Kunimi High School

Senior career*
Years	Team	Apps	(Gls)
1992–1997	Sanfrecce Hiroshima	99	(8)
1998–1999	Yokohama F. Marinos	19	(0)
1999–2002	Urawa Reds	55	(0)
2003	Vissel Kobe	0	(0)
2003	Oita Trinita	0	(0)
Total		173	(8)

International career
1996	Japan U-23	3	(0)
1996–1997	Japan	4	(0)
Medal record
Sanfrecce Hiroshima
Runner-up	J1 League	1994
Runner-up	Emperor's Cup	1995
Runner-up	Emperor's Cup	1996
Urawa Reds
Runner-up	J.League Cup	2002
- * Club domestic league appearances and goals

Ryuji Michiki (路木 龍次, Michiki Ryuji; born 25 August 1973) is a former Japanese football player. He played for Japan national team.

== Club career ==
Michiki was born in Nagasaki Prefecture on 25 August 1973. After graduating from high school, he joined Sanfrecce Hiroshima in 1992. He mainly played as left side-back. The club won the 2nd place at 1995 and 1996 Emperor's Cup. Although he moved to Yokohama Marinos (later Yokohama F. Marinos) in 1998, his opportunity to play decreased. He moved to Urawa Reds in 1999. In 2003, although he moved to Vissel Kobe in January, he resigned in February. Although he signed with Oita Trinita in April, he resigned in June.

== National team career ==
In July 1996, Michiki was selected Japan U-23 national team for 1996 Summer Olympics and he played in all matches. In first match against Brazil U-23 national team, he assisted Teruyoshi Ito's goal and Japan won Brazil (1–0). It was known as "Miracle of Miami" (マイアミの奇跡) in Japan.

On 13 October 1996, he debuted for Japan national team against Tunisia. He was selected Japan for 1996 Asian Cup in December, but he did not play in the match. He played 4 games for Japan until 1997.

== Club statistics ==
Appearances and goals by club, season and competition
Club	Season	League			Emperor's Cup		J.League Cup		Total	
Club	Season	Division	Apps	Goals	Apps	Goals	Apps	Goals	Apps	Goals
Sanfrecce Hiroshima	1992	J1 League	—		0	0	5	0	5	0
Sanfrecce Hiroshima	1993	J1 League	0	0	0	0	0	0	0	0
Sanfrecce Hiroshima	1994	J1 League	12	0	0	0	0	0	12	0
Sanfrecce Hiroshima	1995	J1 League	44	5	3	0	—		47	5
Sanfrecce Hiroshima	1996	J1 League	17	2	5	0	8	1	30	3
Sanfrecce Hiroshima	1997	J1 League	26	1	2	0	0	0	28	1
Yokohama Marinos	1998	J1 League	18	0	3	0	4	0	25	0
Yokohama F. Marinos	1999	J1 League	1	0	0	0	0	0	1	0
Urawa Reds	1999	J1 League	15	0	2	0	4	0	21	0
Urawa Reds	2000	J2 League	14	0	0	0	0	0	14	0
Urawa Reds	2001	J1 League	16	0	4	0	3	0	23	0
Urawa Reds	2002	J1 League	10	0	0	0	6	0	16	0
Vissel Kobe	2003	J1 League	0	0	0	0	0	0	0	0
Oita Trinita	2003	J1 League	0	0	0	0	0	0	0	0
Career total			173	8	16	0	31	1	220	9

== National team statistics ==
Japan national team
Year	Apps	Goals
1996	1	0
1997	3	0
Total	4	0
