= Mitsuaki Kojima =

Japanese footballer

Mitsuaki Kojima 小島 光顕
Personal information
- Full name: Mitsuaki Kojima
- Date of birth: 14 July 1968 (age 58)
- Place of birth: Nagasaki, Japan
- Height: 1.74 m (5 ft 8 1/2 in)
- Positions: Defender; midfielder

Youth career
- 1984–1986: Kunimi High School
- 1987–1990: Tokyo University of Agriculture

Senior career*
Years	Team	Apps	(Gls)
1991–1992	Fujitsu	46	(3)
1993–1998	Sanfrecce Hiroshima	155	(4)
1999–2002	Avispa Fukuoka	109	(0)
Total		310	(7)
Medal record
Sanfrecce Hiroshima
Runner-up	J1 League	1994
Runner-up	Emperor's Cup	1995
Runner-up	Emperor's Cup	1996
- * Club domestic league appearances and goals

Mitsuaki Kojima (小島 光顕, Kojima Mitsuaki; born 14 July 1968) is a former Japanese football player.

== Playing career ==
Kojima was born in Nagasaki Prefecture on 14 July 1968. After graduating from Tokyo University of Agriculture, he joined Fujitsu in 1991. He became a regular player as a defensive midfielder in his first season. In 1993, he moved to Sanfrecce Hiroshima. He also played as a defender, not only as a defensive midfielder. He played as a regular player and the club won second place in the 1994 J1 League, 1995, and 1996 Emperor's Cup. In 1999, he moved to Avispa Fukuoka. He played as a regular player as a center back. The club was relegated to the J2 League at the end of the 2001 season. Although he played often in 2002, he left the club for generational change and retired at the end of the 2002 season.

== Club statistics ==
Club performance			League		Cup		League Cup		Total	
Season	Club	League	Apps	Goals	Apps	Goals	Apps	Goals	Apps	Goals
Japan			League		Emperor's Cup		J.League Cup		Total	
1991/92	Fujitsu	JSL Division 2	28	2			1	0	29	2
1992	Fujitsu	Football League	18	1			-		18	1
1993	Sanfrecce Hiroshima	J1 League	27	3	3	0	6	1	36	4
1994	Sanfrecce Hiroshima	J1 League	15	0	1	0	0	0	16	0
1995	Sanfrecce Hiroshima	J1 League	33	0	5	0	-		38	0
1996	Sanfrecce Hiroshima	J1 League	26	1	5	0	14	0	45	1
1997	Sanfrecce Hiroshima	J1 League	30	0	2	0	5	0	37	0
1998	Sanfrecce Hiroshima	J1 League	24	0	2	0	2	0	28	0
1999	Avispa Fukuoka	J1 League	22	0	2	0	3	0	27	0
2000	Avispa Fukuoka	J1 League	27	0	1	0	2	0	30	0
2001	Avispa Fukuoka	J1 League	29	0	1	0	3	0	33	0
2002	Avispa Fukuoka	J2 League	31	0	0	0	-		31	0
Total			310	7	22	0	36	1	368	8
