= Kazuya Maekawa =

Japanese footballer

Kazuya Maekawa 前川 和也
Personal information
- Full name: Kazuya Maekawa
- Date of birth: March 22, 1968 (age 58)
- Place of birth: Hirado, Nagasaki, Japan
- Height: 1.89 m (6 ft 2 1/2 in)
- Position: Goalkeeper

Youth career
- 1983–1985: Hirado High School

Senior career*
Years	Team	Apps	(Gls)
1986–1999	Sanfrecce Hiroshima	210	(0)
2000–2001	Oita Trinita	75	(0)
Total		285	(0)

International career
1992–1996	Japan	17	(0)
Medal record
Sanfrecce Hiroshima
Runner-up	J1 League	1994
Runner-up	Emperor's Cup	1987
Runner-up	Emperor's Cup	1995
Runner-up	Emperor's Cup	1996
Runner-up	Emperor's Cup	1999
Representing Japan
AFC Asian Cup
Gold medal – first place	1992 Japan
- * Club domestic league appearances and goals

Kazuya Maekawa (前川 和也, Maekawa Kazuya; born March 22, 1968) is a former Japanese football player. He played for Japan national team. His son Daiya Maekawa is also footballer.

== Club career ==
Maekawa was educated at and played for Hirado High School. After graduating in 1986, he joined Japan Soccer League side Mazda. When Japan's first-ever professional league J1 League started in 1993, Mazda was transformed to Sanfrecce Hiroshima for whom he continued to play. In April 1990, he had a trial at Manchester United. He had been the first-choice GK for the club since 1989 although he was prone to injuries. He decided to have an operation on his shoulder in 1998 and his place was filled in by Takashi Shimoda who kept the place after Maekawa came back. Maekawa was transferred to J2 League side Oita Trinita in 2000 before retiring from the game after the 2001 season.

== National team career ==
Maekawa was capped 17 times for the Japan national team from 1992 to 1996. His first cap came on June 7, 1992 in a friendly against Wales in Ehime Matsuyama Athletic Stadium. He was a member of the Japan team that won the 1992 Asian Cup. He played 2 games after first-choice keeper Shigetatsu Matsunaga was shown a red card in the semi-final against China.

== Coaching career ==
After finishing his playing career, he remained at Oita Trinita and worked in the areas of marketing, operations and developments until 2005. He is now a coach at Sanfrecce Tsuneishi Soccer School, one of the affiliated soccer schools of Sanfrecce Hiroshima.

== Club statistics ==
Club performance			League		Cup		League cup		Total	
Season	Club	Division	Apps	Goals	Apps	Goals	Apps	Goals	Apps	Goals
1986–87	Mazda	JSL Division 1	0	0					0	0
1987–88	Mazda	JSL Division 1	0	0			0	0	0	0
1988–89	Mazda	JSL Division 2	2	0			0	0	2	0
1989–90	Mazda	JSL Division 2	30	0			2	0	32	0
1990–91	Mazda	JSL Division 2	30	0			3	0	33	0
1991–92	Mazda	JSL Division 1	20	0			2	0	22	0
1992	Sanfrecce Hiroshima	J1 League	–		0	0	1	0	1	0
1993	Sanfrecce Hiroshima	J1 League	15	0	0	0	0	0	15	0
1994	Sanfrecce Hiroshima	J1 League	27	0	0	0	0	0	27	0
1995	Sanfrecce Hiroshima	J1 League	37	0	0	0	–		37	0
1996	Sanfrecce Hiroshima	J1 League	25	0	5	0	14	0	44	0
1997	Sanfrecce Hiroshima	J1 League	24	0	0	0	6	0	30	0
1998	Sanfrecce Hiroshima	J1 League	0	0	0	0	0	0	0	0
1999	Sanfrecce Hiroshima	J1 League	0	0	0	0	2	0	2	0
2000	Oita Trinita	J2 League	37	0	0	0	0	0	37	0
2001	Oita Trinita	J2 League	38	0	2	0	2	0	42	0
Total			285	0	12	0	32	0	329	0

== National team statistics ==
Japan national team
Year	Apps	Goals
1992	3	0
1993	2	0
1994	2	0
1995	5	0
1996	5	0
Total	17	0

== Honors ==
=== International ===
Japan

- AFC Asian Cup (1): 1992 1992 Asian Cup (champions)
