= Hiroshige Yanagimoto =

Japanese footballer

Hiroshige Yanagimoto 柳本 啓成
Personal information
- Full name: Hiroshige Yanagimoto
- Date of birth: October 15, 1972 (age 54)
- Place of birth: Higashiosaka, Japan
- Height: 1.75 m (5 ft 9 in)
- Position: Defender

Youth career
- 1988–1990: Nara Ikuei High School

Senior career*
Years	Team	Apps	(Gls)
1991–1998	Sanfrecce Hiroshima	174	(4)
1999–2002	Gamba Osaka	73	(0)
2003–2006	Cerezo Osaka	73	(0)
Total		320	(4)

International career
1995–1997	Japan	30	(0)
Medal record
Sanfrecce Hiroshima
Runner-up	J1 League	1994
Runner-up	Emperor's Cup	1995
Runner-up	Emperor's Cup	1996
Cerezo Osaka
Runner-up	Emperor's Cup	2003
- * Club domestic league appearances and goals

Hiroshige Yanagimoto (柳本 啓成, Yanagimoto Hiroshige; born October 15, 1972) is a former Japanese football player. He played for Japan national team.

== Club career ==
Yanagimoto was born in Higashiosaka on October 15, 1972. After graduating from high school, he joined Mazda (later Sanfrecce Hiroshima) in 1991. He played as regular player at right side-back. The club won the 2nd place at 1994 J1 League, 1995 and 1996 Emperor's Cup. In 1999, he moved to his local club Gamba Osaka. He moved to rival team, Cerezo Osaka in 2003. The club won the 2nd place at 2003 Emperor's Cup. He retired at the end of the 2006 season.

== International career ==
In January 1995, Yanagimoto was selected for the Japan national team for the 1995 King Fahd Cup. At this competition, on January 8, he debuted against Argentina. After debut, he became a regular player at right side-back. In 1996, he played in all matches included 1996 Asian Cup. However at 1998 World Cup qualification in March 1997, he got hurt and subsequently dropped from the national team. He had played 30 games for Japan until 1997.

== Career statistics ==
=== Club ===
Club performance			League		Cup		League Cup		Total	
Season	Club	League	Apps	Goals	Apps	Goals	Apps	Goals	Apps	Goals
Japan			League		Emperor's Cup		J.League Cup		Total	
1991/92	Mazda	JSL Division 1	0	0	0	0	0	0	0	0
1992	Sanfrecce Hiroshima	J1 League	-		0	0	0	0	0	0
1993	Sanfrecce Hiroshima	J1 League	19	0	2	0	0	0	21	0
1994	Sanfrecce Hiroshima	J1 League	40	4	3	1	1	0	44	5
1995	Sanfrecce Hiroshima	J1 League	50	0	5	0	-		55	0
1996	Sanfrecce Hiroshima	J1 League	29	0	5	1	14	0	48	1
1997	Sanfrecce Hiroshima	J1 League	13	0	0	0	0	0	13	0
1998	Sanfrecce Hiroshima	J1 League	23	0	2	0	4	0	29	0
1999	Gamba Osaka	J1 League	20	0	0	0	4	0	24	0
2000	Gamba Osaka	J1 League	14	0	4	0	2	0	20	0
2001	Gamba Osaka	J1 League	28	0	2	0	4	0	34	0
2002	Gamba Osaka	J1 League	11	0	0	0	5	0	16	0
2003	Cerezo Osaka	J1 League	17	0	5	0	0	0	22	0
2004	Cerezo Osaka	J1 League	13	0	0	0	2	0	15	0
2005	Cerezo Osaka	J1 League	28	0	4	0	7	0	39	0
2006	Cerezo Osaka	J1 League	15	0	0	0	5	0	20	0
Total			320	4	32	2	48	0	400	6

=== International ===
Japan national team
Year	Apps	Goals
1995	12	0
1996	13	0
1997	5	0
Total	30	0

== Personal life ==
Yanagimoto married Japanese actress, Atsuko Okamoto, in July 2005, but divorced in July 2017.
