= 1994 Sanfrecce Hiroshima season =

Sanfrecce Hiroshima
1994 season
- Manager: Stuart Baxter
- Stadium: Hiroshima Stadium
- J.League: Runners-up
- Emperor's Cup: Quarterfinals
- J.League Cup: 1st Round
- Top goalscorer: League: Hašek (19); All: Hašek (20)
- Highest home attendance: 13,307 (vs Shimizu S-Pulse, 10 September 1994); 42,505 (vs Verdy Kawasaki, 3 September 1994, Hiroshima Big Arch)
- Lowest home attendance: 8,523 (vs Júbilo Iwata, 16 November 1994)
- Average home league attendance: 17,189
Home colours	Away colours

1994 Sanfrecce Hiroshima season

== Review and events ==
Sanfrecce Hiroshima won J.League Suntory series (first stage).

=== League results summary ===
Overall								Home						Away					
Pld	W	D	L	GF	GA	GD	Pts	W	D	L	GF	GA	GD	W	D	L	GF	GA	GD
44	29	0	15	71	57	+14	87	16	0	6	42	34	+8	13	0	9	29	23	+6

Source: J.LEAGUE OFFICIAL 1995 RECORD & DATA. ISBN 4-09-102317-7.

=== League results by round ===
J.League Suntory series (first stage)
Round	1	2	3	4	5	6	7	8	9	10	11	12	13	14	15	16	17	18	19	20	21	22
Ground	H	A	H	A	H	A	H	A	H	A	H	H	A	H	A	H	A	H	A	H	A	A
Result	W	W	W	W	W	W	L	W	L	W	W	W	W	W	L	W	W	L	W	W	W	L
Position	3	1	2	1	1	1	2	2	3	3	3	2	2	2	2	1	1	1	1	1	1	1

Source: J.LEAGUE OFFICIAL 1995 RECORD & DATA. ISBN 4-09-102317-7.
A = Away; H = Home; W = Win; D = Draw; L = Loss

J.League NICOS series (second stage)
Round	1	2	3	4	5	6	7	8	9	10	11	12	13	14	15	16	17	18	19	20	21	22
Ground	H	A	H	A	H	A	H	A	H	A	A	H	A	H	A	H	A	H	A	H	H	A
Result	W	W	W	W	L	L	W	L	L	W	L	W	L	W	L	L	W	W	L	W	W	L
Position	1	3	2	1	2	4	4	4	4	4	4	4	5	5	5	5	4	4	4	4	4	4

Source: J.LEAGUE OFFICIAL 1995 RECORD & DATA. ISBN 4-09-102317-7.
A = Away; H = Home; W = Win; D = Draw; L = Loss

== Competitions ==
Competitions	Position
J.League	Runners-up / 12 clubs
Emperor's Cup	Quarterfinals
J.League Cup	1st round

== Domestic results ==
=== J.League ===
==== Suntory series ====
12 March 1994 1st-1	Sanfrecce Hiroshima	2–0	Nagoya Grampus Eight	Hiroshima Big Arch
14:33 JST (UTC+09)	Noh 87'; Takagi 89'	J. League		Attendance: 11,503; Referee: Yoshimi Ogawa; Assistant referees: Yoshikazu Hiroshima, Hiroshi Tanabe; Fourth official: Shinya Sasamoto; Man of the Match: Noh Jung-Youn

16 March 1994 1st-2	Gamba Osaka	1–2 (V-goal) (a.e.t.)	Sanfrecce Hiroshima	Expo '70 Commemorative Stadium
19:00 JST (UTC+09)	Yamaguchi 44'	J. League	Shima 71'; Hašek 118'	Attendance: 18,737; Referee: Kenji Tanaka; Assistant referees: Kazunori Ōtoshi, Yasuhiro Hemmi; Fourth official: Tsuyoshi Miyake; Man of the Match: Ivan Hašek

19 March 1994 1st-3	Sanfrecce Hiroshima	2–1	Yokohama Flügels	Hiroshima Stadium
15:02 JST (UTC+09)	Shima 40'; Hašek 51'	J. League	Válber 58'	Attendance: 11,387; Referee: Hideo Kikuchi; Assistant referees: Hideaki Harada, Toyohide Kanda; Fourth official: Kazuhiko Matsumura; Man of the Match: Takumi Shima

23 March 1994 1st-4	Urawa Red Diamonds	0–1	Sanfrecce Hiroshima	Urawa Komaba Stadium
19:02 JST (UTC+09)		J. League	Noh 27'	Attendance: 7,854; Referee: Shizuo Takada; Assistant referees: Hitoshi Yamada, Toshiyuki Mayuzumi; Fourth official: Masahisa Kajiwara; Man of the Match: Kazuya Maekawa

26 March 1994 1st-5	Sanfrecce Hiroshima	4–2	Bellmare Hiratsuka	Hiroshima Big Arch
15:03 JST (UTC+09)	Noh 51'; Černý 68', 81'; Moriyasu 89'	J. League	T. Iwamoto 19'; Betinho 76'	Attendance: 12,041; Referee: Yōtarō Moritsu; Assistant referees: Morihisa Yamaguchi, Sōichirō Kaneko; Fourth official: Syūji Kagawa; Man of the Match: Černý

2 April 1994 1st-6	Kashima Antlers	0–2	Sanfrecce Hiroshima	Kashima Soccer Stadium
15:02 JST (UTC+09)		J. League	Takagi 33'; Noh 82'	Attendance: 14,128; Referee: Zoran Petrović; Assistant referees: Kōetsu Kikuchi, Naotsugu Fuse; Fourth official: Masao Komada; Man of the Match: Takuya Takagi

6 April 1994 1st-7	Sanfrecce Hiroshima	0–5	Verdy Kawasaki	Hiroshima Big Arch
19:03 JST (UTC+09)		J. League	Miura 22', 38' (pen.); Ramos 29'; Takeda 73'; Kitazawa 87'	Attendance: 27,052; Referee: Bengt Borjesson; Assistant referees: Fumikazu Shioyazono, Hiroshi Tanabe; Fourth official: Norio Kuriyama

9 April 1994 1st-8	Yokohama Marinos	0–2	Sanfrecce Hiroshima	Yokohama Mitsuzawa Football Stadium
19:03 JST (UTC+09)		J. League	Černý 43', 69'	Attendance: 13,739; Referee: Masahiro Sogawa; Assistant referees: Takeshi Ōkura, Kazuhisa Osada; Fourth official: Yoshiharu Nakamura; Man of the Match: Černý

13 April 1994 1st-9	Sanfrecce Hiroshima	1–3	Shimizu S-Pulse	Hiroshima Big Arch
19:03 JST (UTC+09)	Černý 58' (pen.)	J. League	Toninho 18', 21'; Sawanobori 87'	Attendance: 10,308; Referee: Bengt Borjesson; Assistant referees: Kazuo Kakihana, Hiroshi Tanabe; Fourth official: Shinji Saga

16 April 1994 1st-10	JEF United Ichihara	1–3	Sanfrecce Hiroshima	Tecnoport Fukui Stadium
14:00 JST (UTC+09)	Otze 89'	J. League	Takagi 68', 70'; Černý 85'	Attendance: 14,846; Referee: Shizuo Takada; Assistant referees: Takeshi Ōkura, Kōji Taniuchi; Fourth official: Kazuya Takahara; Man of the Match: Takuya Takagi

23 April 1994 1st-11	Sanfrecce Hiroshima	3–0	Júbilo Iwata	Hiroshima Big Arch
15:05 JST (UTC+09)	Hašek 59', 64'; Yanagimoto 76'	J. League		Attendance: 23,144; Referee: Hiroyuki Umemoto; Assistant referees: Hiroshi Tanabe, Hideaki Harada; Fourth official: Shinji Saga; Man of the Match: Hašek

27 April 1994 1st-12	Sanfrecce Hiroshima	3–3 (V-goal) (a.e.t.) (5–4 p)	Gamba Osaka	Hakatanomori Athletic Stadium
: JST (UTC+09)	Yanagimoto 9'; Hašek 14', 33'	J. League	Protassov 62', 71'; Karashima 86'	Attendance: 15,129; Referee: Kōetsu Kikuchi; Assistant referees: Hideaki Harada, Tōru Yamashiro; Fourth official: Masatoshi Shibata; Man of the Match: Kazuya Maekawa
	Penalties
	(penalty missed) Kazama; (penalty scored) Katanosaka; (penalty scored) Moriyasu; (penalty scored) Černý; (penalty scored) Hašek; (penalty scored) Takagi		(penalty missed) Isogai; (penalty scored) Flavio; (penalty scored) Protassov; (penalty scored) Aleinikov; (penalty scored) Karashima; (penalty missed) Matsunami

30 April 1994 1st-13	Yokohama Flügels	1–2	Sanfrecce Hiroshima	Nagasaki Stadium
15:02 JST (UTC+09)	Edu 19' (pen.)	J. League	Hašek 59'; Takagi 76'	Attendance: 15,958; Referee: Bengt Borjesson; Assistant referees: Noboru Ishiyama, Hideaki Harada; Fourth official: Shigehisa Yamaguchi; Man of the Match: Takuya Takagi

4 May 1994 1st-14	Sanfrecce Hiroshima	1–0	Urawa Red Diamonds	Hiroshima Big Arch
18:33 JST (UTC+09)	Hašek 89'	J. League		Attendance: 21,077; Referee: Kenji Tanaka; Assistant referees: Yoshikazu Hiroshima, Hideaki Harada; Fourth official: Kōji Ueno; Man of the Match: Hašek

7 May 1994 1st-15	Bellmare Hiratsuka	1–1 (V-goal) (a.e.t.) (5–4 p)	Sanfrecce Hiroshima	Hiratsuka Stadium
18:34 JST (UTC+09)	Mirandinha 89'	J. League	2' (o.g.)	Attendance: 14,785; Referee: Zoran Petrović; Assistant referees: Yasuhiro Matsuzaki, Kazuhisa Osada; Fourth official: Takeshi Ōgiya
	Penalties
	(penalty missed) Mirandinha; (penalty scored) Natsuka; (penalty scored) Sorimachi; (penalty scored) Almir; (penalty scored) Edson; (penalty scored) Shintō		(penalty scored) Takagi; (penalty missed) Moriyasu; (penalty scored) Moriyama; (penalty scored) Černý; (penalty scored) Hašek; (penalty missed) Shima

14 May 1994 1st-16	Sanfrecce Hiroshima	2–0	Kashima Antlers	Hiroshima Big Arch
15:01 JST (UTC+09)	Noh 37', 58'	J. League		Attendance: 35,108; Referee: Yoshimi Ogawa; Assistant referees: Hideaki Harada, Hiroshi Tanabe; Fourth official: Kazuyuki Tanimoto; Man of the Match: Noh Jung-Youn

18 May 1994 1st-17	Verdy Kawasaki	1–4	Sanfrecce Hiroshima	Kawasaki Todoroki Stadium
19:02 JST (UTC+09)	Miura 71' (pen.)	J. League	Hašek 27', 41', 74'; Moriyasu 50'	Attendance: 10,571; Referee: Zoran Petrović; Assistant referees: Keiichi Sunakawa, Tetsu Karakida; Fourth official: Masao Imamura; Man of the Match: Hašek

1 June 1994 1st-18	Sanfrecce Hiroshima	1–2	Yokohama Marinos	Hiroshima Big Arch
19:05 JST (UTC+09)	Hašek 72'	J. League	Bisconti 30'; Díaz 33'	Attendance: 13,416; Referee: Shizuo Takada; Assistant referees: Morihisa Yamaguchi, Hiroshi Tanabe; Fourth official: Mamoru Ueda

4 June 1994 1st-19	Shimizu S-Pulse	1–2	Sanfrecce Hiroshima	Nihondaira Sports Stadium
19:01 JST (UTC+09)	Nagashima 82'	J. League	Takagi 49', 61'	Attendance: 10,361; Referee: Zoran Petrović; Assistant referees: Yū Nakamura, Sōichirō Kaneko; Fourth official: Masakazu Hōjō; Man of the Match: Yahiro Kazama

8 June 1994 1st-20	Sanfrecce Hiroshima	4–2	JEF United Ichihara	Hiroshima Stadium
19:04 JST (UTC+09)	Hašek 53'; Yanagimoto 67'; Takagi 73'; Moriyasu 85'	J. League	Echigo 72', 89'	Attendance: 13,054; Referee: Kōetsu Kikuchi; Assistant referees: Mitsuo Kadota, Kazunori Ōtoshi; Fourth official: Katsuya Motoyasu; Man of the Match: Takuya Takagi

11 June 1994 1st-21	Júbilo Iwata	1–2	Sanfrecce Hiroshima	Júbilo Iwata Stadium
19:05 JST (UTC+09)	M. Endō 29'	J. League	Takagi 38'; Černý 89'	Attendance: 14,773; Referee: Masayoshi Okada; Assistant referees: Kazuya Yanagisawa, Yasushi Tsuchimoto; Fourth official: Tōru Nagata; Man of the Match: Černý

15 June 1994 1st-22	Nagoya Grampus Eight	1–0	Sanfrecce Hiroshima	Nagoya Minato Stadium
19:03 JST (UTC+09)	Moriyama 66'	J. League		Attendance: 16,547; Referee: Kenji Tanaka; Assistant referees: Yasushi Tsuchimoto, Naoyuki Mori; Fourth official: Akihiko Kakei

==== NICOS series ====
10 August 1994 2nd-1	Sanfrecce Hiroshima	4–0	Nagoya Grampus Eight	Hiroshima Stadium
19:03 JST (UTC+09)	Černý 6'; 7' (o.g.); Hašek 34', 66'	J. League		Attendance: 11,796; Referee: Shinichirō Obata; Assistant referees: Morihisa Yamaguchi, Hideaki Harada; Fourth official: Kōji Ueno; Man of the Match: Hašek

13 August 1994 2nd-2	Gamba Osaka	1–1 (V-goal) (a.e.t.) (3–4 p)	Sanfrecce Hiroshima	Expo '70 Commemorative Stadium
19:00 JST (UTC+09)	Morioka 44'	J. League	Noh 6'	Attendance: 19,209; Referee: Yoshimi Ogawa; Assistant referees: Sōichirō Kaneko, Toyohide Kanda; Fourth official: Akio Okutani; Man of the Match: Kazuya Maekawa
	Penalties
	(penalty scored) Flavio; (penalty scored) Yamaguchi; (penalty missed) Protassov; (penalty scored) Mita; (penalty missed) Matsuyama; (penalty missed) Karashima		(penalty scored) Tore; (penalty missed) Kazama; (penalty missed) Matsuda; (penalty scored) Moriyasu; (penalty scored) Noh; (penalty scored) Moriyama

17 August 1994 2nd-3	Sanfrecce Hiroshima	4–1	Yokohama Flügels	Hiroshima Stadium
19:03 JST (UTC+09)	Takagi 13', 64' (pen.); Fue 44'; Hašek 45'	J. League	Katsura 76'	Attendance: 11,782; Referee: Keiichi Sunakawa; Assistant referees: Hideaki Harada, Satoru Kawano; Fourth official: Kazuyuki Tanimoto; Man of the Match: Takuya Takagi

20 August 1994 2nd-4	Urawa Red Diamonds	0–2	Sanfrecce Hiroshima	Omiya Football Stadium
18:30 JST (UTC+09)		J. League	Hašek 32'; Noh 83'	Attendance: 9,367; Referee: Kōetsu Kikuchi; Assistant referees: Yū Nakamura, Kimio Izaki; Fourth official: Masahisa Kajiwara; Man of the Match: Hašek

27 August 1994 2nd-5	Sanfrecce Hiroshima	1–6	Bellmare Hiratsuka	Hiroshima Stadium
18:33 JST (UTC+09)	Shima 54'	J. League	Noguchi 21', 43', 70'; Betinho 66'; Kumon 68'; Edson 74'	Attendance: 12,771; Referee: Fumikazu Shioyazono; Assistant referees: Hiroshi Tanabe, Mitsuo Kadota; Fourth official: Kazuhiko Matsumura

31 August 1994 2nd-6	Kashima Antlers	1–0 (V-goal) (a.e.t.)	Sanfrecce Hiroshima	Kashima Soccer Stadium
: JST (UTC+09)	Hasegawa 100'	J. League		Attendance: 15,947; Referee: Kiichirō Tachi; Assistant referees: Hiroshi Fukuda, Masato Nogami; Fourth official: Ichirō Inukai

3 September 1994 2nd-7	Sanfrecce Hiroshima	3–2	Verdy Kawasaki	Hiroshima Big Arch
19:05 JST (UTC+09)	Černý 7', 75'; Yanagimoto 52'	J. League	Bentinho 21', 54'	Attendance: 42,505; Referee: Hiroyuki Umemoto; Assistant referees: Morihisa Yamaguchi, Naoki Esumi; Fourth official: Mamoru Ueda; Man of the Match: Černý

7 September 1994 2nd-8	Yokohama Marinos	3–0	Sanfrecce Hiroshima	Yokohama Mitsuzawa Football Stadium
19:03 JST (UTC+09)	Medina Bello 44', 66'; Yamada 86'	J. League		Attendance: 12,971; Referee: Alberto Tejada; Assistant referees: Noboru Ishiyama, Yū Nakamura; Fourth official: Tōru Kamikawa

10 September 1994 2nd-9	Sanfrecce Hiroshima	0–1	Shimizu S-Pulse	Hiroshima Stadium
18:32 JST (UTC+09)		J. League	Toninho 43'	Attendance: 13,307; Referee: Hideo Kikuchi; Assistant referees: Naotsugu Fuse, Hideaki Harada; Fourth official: Norio Kuriyama

14 September 1994 2nd-10	JEF United Ichihara	0–1 (V-goal) (a.e.t.)	Sanfrecce Hiroshima	Tochigi Utsunomiya Green Stadium
18:32 JST (UTC+09)		J. League	Noh 97'	Attendance: 16,875; Referee: Masahiro Sogawa; Assistant referees: Yū Nakamura, Mitsuru Satō; Fourth official: Hiroshi Suzuki; Man of the Match: Noh Jung-Youn

17 September 1994 2nd-11	Júbilo Iwata	0–0 (V-goal) (a.e.t.) (4–3 p)	Sanfrecce Hiroshima	Júbilo Iwata Stadium
14:00 JST (UTC+09)		J. League		Attendance: 13,970; Referee: Kiichirō Tachi; Assistant referees: Kazuo Kakihana, Yasuhiro Hemmi; Fourth official: Tōru Nagata
	Penalties
	(penalty scored) Vanenburg; (penalty scored) Hattori; (penalty scored) Fujita; (penalty missed) M. Yoshida; (penalty scored) Kudō		(penalty scored) Tore; (penalty missed) Moriyama; (penalty scored) Katanosaka; (penalty scored) Noh; (penalty missed) Satō

21 September 1994 2nd-12	Sanfrecce Hiroshima	1–1 (V-goal) (a.e.t.) (4–3 p)	Gamba Osaka	Fukuyama Stadium
19:03 JST (UTC+09)	Hašek 2'	J. League	Yamamura 43'	Attendance: 8,898; Referee: Zoran Petrović; Assistant referees: Hiroshi Tanabe, Naoki Esumi; Fourth official: Hisae Nakamura; Man of the Match: Yahiro Kazama
	Penalties
	(penalty scored) Kazama; (penalty scored) Tore; (penalty missed) Katanosaka; (penalty scored) Moriyama; (penalty scored) Černý		(penalty scored) Flavio; (penalty missed) Kitamura; (penalty missed) Tsveiba; (penalty scored) Isogai; (penalty scored) Kiyama

19 October 1994 2nd-13	Yokohama Flügels	3–1	Sanfrecce Hiroshima	Tokyo National Stadium
19:03 JST (UTC+09)	Edu 32'; Maeda 61'; Válber 68'	J. League	Takagi 44'	Attendance: 49,650; Referee: Zoran Petrović; Assistant referees: Hiroshi Fukuda, Kazuaki Hamaguchi; Fourth official: Mineo Takada

22 October 1994 2nd-14	Sanfrecce Hiroshima	1–0	Urawa Red Diamonds	Hiroshima Big Arch
18:35 JST (UTC+09)	Noh 31'	J. League		Attendance: 15,903; Referee: Zoran Petrović; Assistant referees: Yoshikazu Hiroshima, Mitsuo Kadota; Fourth official: Yutaka Miyake; Man of the Match: Noh Jung-Youn

26 October 1994 2nd-15	Bellmare Hiratsuka	4–1	Sanfrecce Hiroshima	Hiratsuka Stadium
19:03 JST (UTC+09)	Betinho 38' (pen.), 64'; Noguchi 58'; Watanabe 78'	J. League	Černý 89'	Attendance: 15,094; Referee: Kiyoshi Ōta; Assistant referees: Hitoshi Yamada, Takashi Kunori; Fourth official: Katsumi Ishii

29 October 1994 2nd-16	Sanfrecce Hiroshima	2–4	Kashima Antlers	Hiroshima Big Arch
19:05 JST (UTC+09)	Černý 43'; Takagi 72'	J. League	Hasegawa 3'; Kurosaki 66'; Alcindo 73', 80'	Attendance: 30,621; Referee: Hiroyuki Umemoto; Assistant referees: Kazuya Yanagisawa, Kazuo Kakihana; Fourth official: Satoru Yamada

2 November 1994 2nd-17	Verdy Kawasaki	0–1	Sanfrecce Hiroshima	Kawasaki Todoroki Stadium
19:03 JST (UTC+09)		J. League	Hašek 16'	Attendance: 15,554; Referee: Alberto Tejada; Assistant referees: Yū Nakamura, Yoshikazu Hiroshima; Fourth official: Yoshiharu Nakamura; Man of the Match: Ryūji Michiki

5 November 1994 2nd-18	Sanfrecce Hiroshima	2–1	Yokohama Marinos	Ehime Matsuyama Athletic Stadium
18:04 JST (UTC+09)	Černý 21', 53'	J. League	Jinno 5'	Attendance: 17,105; Referee: Shinichirō Obata; Assistant referees: Kazuya Yanagisawa, Satoru Kawano; Fourth official: Tatsuya Hyōdō; Man of the Match: Černý

9 November 1994 2nd-19	Shimizu S-Pulse	2–1	Sanfrecce Hiroshima	Kusanagi Athletic Stadium
19:01 JST (UTC+09)	Hasegawa 62'; Djalminha 80'	J. League	Černý 41'	Attendance: 19,002; Referee: Yoshitsugu Katayama; Assistant referees: Masahiro Katagiri, Takashi Kunori; Fourth official: Teruhito Kudō

12 November 1994 2nd-20	Sanfrecce Hiroshima	1–0 (V-goal) (a.e.t.)	JEF United Ichihara	Hiroshima Stadium
15:04 JST (UTC+09)	Takagi 93'	J. League		Attendance: 11,765; Referee: Tetsuya Hamana; Assistant referees: Hiroshi Tanabe, Kazunori Ōtoshi; Fourth official: Satoshi Hanashige; Man of the Match: Takuya Takagi

16 November 1994 2nd-21	Sanfrecce Hiroshima	0–0 (V-goal) (a.e.t.) (7–6 p)	Júbilo Iwata	Hiroshima Stadium
19:04 JST (UTC+09)		J. League		Attendance: 8,523; Referee: Zoran Petrović; Assistant referees: Yasuhiro Matsuzaki, Naoki Esumi; Fourth official: Shinji Saga; Man of the Match: Kazumasa Kawano
	Penalties
	(penalty scored) Kazama; (penalty scored) Moriyama; (penalty missed) Moriyasu; (penalty scored) Yanagimoto; (penalty scored) Černý; (penalty scored) Takagi; (penalty scored) Noh; (penalty scored) Kojima		(penalty scored) Vanenburg; (penalty scored) Hattori; (penalty scored) Fujita; (penalty missed) Yonezawa; (penalty scored) Matsubara; (penalty scored) Tanaka; (penalty scored) Koga; (penalty missed) Katsuya

19 November 1994 2nd-22	Nagoya Grampus Eight	1–0 (V-goal) (a.e.t.)	Sanfrecce Hiroshima	Nagoya Mizuho Athletics Stadium
15:03 JST (UTC+09)	Moriyama 100'	J. League		Attendance: 21,506; Referee: Yashitsugu Katayama; Assistant referees: Sōichirō Kaneko, Hideaki Harada; Fourth official: Eiji Murakami

==== J.League Championship ====
26 November 1994 1	Sanfrecce Hiroshima	0–1	Verdy Kawasaki	Hiroshima Big Arch
14:38 JST (UTC+09)		J. League	Kitazawa 35'	Attendance: 42,316; Referee: Alberto Tejada; Assistant referees: Kazuya Yanagisawa, Yasuhiro Matsuzaki; Fourth official: Yōtarō Moritsu

2 December 1994 2	Verdy Kawasaki	1–0 (2–0 agg.)	Sanfrecce Hiroshima	Tokyo National Stadium
19:02 JST (UTC+09)	Ramos 80'	J. League		Attendance: 50,512; Referee: Zoran Petrović; Assistant referees: Noboru Ishiyama, Yoshikazu Hiroshima; Fourth official: Kiyoshi Ōta

=== Emperor's Cup ===
4 December 1994 1st Round	Sanfrecce Hiroshima	1–0 (a.e.t.)	Cosmo Oil	Gifu Nagaragawa Stadium
: JST (UTC+09)	Yanagimoto ?'

11 December 1994 2nd Round	Sanfrecce Hiroshima	2–0 (a.e.t.)	Kofu Club	Kusanagi Athletic Stadium
: JST (UTC+09)	Hašek ?'; Matsuda ?'

18 December 1994 Quarterfinals	Sanfrecce Hiroshima	0–3	Yokohama Marinos	Nagoya Mizuho Athletics Stadium
: JST (UTC+09)			Omura 22'; 26' (o.g.); Bisconti 68'	Attendance: 19,252

=== J.League Cup ===
27 July 1994 1st Round	Gamba Osaka	2–1	Sanfrecce Hiroshima	Expo '70 Commemorative Stadium
19:00 JST (UTC+09)	Flavio 11', 70'	J. League	Černý 8'	Attendance: 19,235; Referee: Yōtarō Moritsu; Assistant referees: Yasuhiro Hemmi, Mitsuo Kadota; Fourth official: Kazuo Kakihana

== Player statistics ==
Pos.	Nat.	Player	D.o.B. (Age)	Height / Weight	J.League		J. Championship		Emperor's Cup		J.League Cup		Total	
Pos.	Nat.	Player	D.o.B. (Age)	Height / Weight	Apps	Goals	Apps	Goals	Apps	Goals	Apps	Goals	Apps	Goals
DF	(Japan)	Hiroshi Matsuda	September 2, 1960 (aged 33)	181 cm / 75 kg	8	0	0	0	2	1	0	0	10	1
MF	(Japan)	Yahiro Kazama	October 16, 1961 (aged 32)	173 cm / 67 kg	43	0	2	0	3	0	1	0	49	0
FW	(Czech Republic)	Černý	October 11, 1962 (aged 31)	181 cm / 80 kg	34	15	1	0	1	0	1	1	37	16
MF	(Czech Republic)	Hašek	September 6, 1963 (aged 30)	171 cm / 65 kg	32	19	2	0	3	1	1	0	38	20
DF	(Japan)	Nobuhiro Ueno	August 26, 1965 (aged 28)	175 cm / 70 kg	0	0	0	0		0	0	0		0
DF	(Japan)	Yasuyuki Satō	April 12, 1966 (aged 27)	176 cm / 67 kg	37	0	1	0	3	0	1	0	42	0
MF	(Japan)	Yasutaka Yoshida	November 22, 1966 (aged 27)	179 cm / 77 kg	0	0	0	0		0	0	0		0
GK	(Japan)	Akira Kawaguchi	January 24, 1967 (aged 27)	188 cm / 80 kg	0	0	0	0		0	0	0		0
FW	(Japan)	Takumi Shima	October 3, 1967 (aged 26)	170 cm / 65 kg	28	3	0	0	2	0	1	0	31	3
DF	(Japan)	Yoshirō Moriyama	November 9, 1967 (aged 26)	175 cm / 72 kg	42	0	2	0	3	0	1	0	48	0
FW	(Japan)	Takuya Takagi	November 12, 1967 (aged 26)	188 cm / 82 kg	42	14	2	0	0	0	1	0	45	14
MF	(Japan)	Akinobu Yokouchi	November 30, 1967 (aged 26)	172 cm / 64 kg	0	0	0	0	3	0	0	0	3	0
GK	(Japan)	Kazuya Maekawa	March 22, 1968 (aged 25)	188 cm / 84 kg	27	0	0	0	0	0	0	0	27	0
MF	(Japan)	Mitsuaki Kojima	July 14, 1968 (aged 25)	173 cm / 70 kg	15	0	2	0	1	0	0	0	18	0
MF	(Japan)	Hajime Moriyasu	August 23, 1968 (aged 25)	173 cm / 62 kg	40	3	2	0	3	0	1	0	46	3
MF	(Japan)	Masakazu Kōda	September 12, 1969 (aged 24)	172 cm / 61 kg	0	0	0	0		0	0	0		0
GK	(Japan)	Kazumasa Kawano	November 7, 1970 (aged 23)	185 cm / 78 kg	17	0	2	0	3	0	1	0	23	0
FW	(South Korea)	Noh Jung-Youn (Note: His name is Noh Jung-Yoon. But his name is listed with Noh Jungyoun on J.League official books in 1994.)	March 28, 1971 (aged 22)	172 cm / 68 kg	36	10	2	0	3	0	1	0	42	10
DF	(Japan)	Tomohiro Katanosaka	April 18, 1971 (aged 22)	172 cm / 70 kg	34	0	1	0	3	0	1	0	39	0
MF	(Japan)	Tetsuya Tanaka	July 27, 1971 (aged 22)	176 cm / 63 kg	0	0	0	0		0	0	0		0
MF	(Japan)	Hiroyoshi Kuwabara	October 2, 1971 (aged 22)	177 cm / 71 kg	0	0	0	0		0	0	0		0
DF	(Japan)	Takashi Ōnishi	October 16, 1971 (aged 22)	178 cm / 71 kg	0	0	0	0		0	0	0		0
FW	(Japan)	Kenji Wakamatsu	August 16, 1972 (aged 21)	179 cm / 76 kg	0	0	0	0		0	0	0		0
DF	(Japan)	Kunihiko Akahane	August 20, 1972 (aged 21)	182 cm / 75 kg	0	0	0	0		0	0	0		0
DF	(Japan)	Hiroshige Yanagimoto	October 15, 1972 (aged 21)	173 cm / 64 kg	40	4	2	0	3	1	1	0	46	5
DF	(Japan)	Hideaki Mori	October 16, 1972 (aged 21)	183 cm / 73 kg	0	0	0	0		0	0	0		0
FW	(Japan)	Shirō Hashimitsu	December 28, 1972 (aged 21)	172 cm / 62 kg	0	0	0	0		0	0	0		0
FW	(Japan)	Masato Fue	February 22, 1973 (aged 21)	174 cm / 65 kg	13	1	0	0	2	0	0	0	15	1
FW	(Japan)	Kazuo Sumata	May 1, 1973 (aged 20)	176 cm / 72 kg	0	0	0	0		0	0	0		0
FW	(Japan)	Yasumasa Makino	July 1, 1973 (aged 20)	172 cm / 65 kg	0	0	0	0		0	0	0		0
DF	(Japan)	Ryūji Michiki	August 25, 1973 (aged 20)	174 cm / 64 kg	12	0	2	0	0	0	0	0	14	0
DF	(Japan)	Kenichi Uemura	April 22, 1974 (aged 19)	180 cm / 70 kg	26	0	2	0	2	0	1	0	31	0
MF	(Japan)	Yūta Abe	July 31, 1974 (aged 19)	177 cm / 69 kg	1	0	0	0	0	0	0	0	1	0
MF	(Brazil)	Andrey	September 23, 1974 (aged 19)	177 cm / 71 kg	2	0	0	0	0	0	0	0	2	0
GK	(Japan)	Takashi Shimoda	November 28, 1975 (aged 18)	183 cm / 74 kg	0	0	0	0		0	0	0		0
DF	(Norway)	Tore †	September 29, 1969 (aged 24)	185 cm / 79 kg	14	0	1	0	2	0	0	0	17	0
GK	(Japan)	Kazuyori Mochizuki †	November 20, 1961 (aged 32)	cm / – kg	0	0	0	0		0	0	0		0

- † player(s) joined the team after the opening of this season.

== Transfers ==
In:

No.	Pos.	Nation	Player
—	GK	JPN	Takashi Shimoda (from Hiroshima Minami High School)
—	DF	JPN	Takashi Ōnishi (from Fukuoka University)
—	MF	CZE	Ivan Hašek (from Strasbourg)
—	MF	JPN	Hiroyoshi Kuwabara (from Osaka University of Health and Sport Sciences)
—	FW	JPN	Shirō Hashimitsu (from Ẽfini Sapporo)

Out:

No.	Pos.	Nation	Player
—	GK	ENG	Lee Baxter (no roster)
—	GK	JPN	Kazuyori Mochizuki (retired)
—	DF	SWE	Vonderburg
—	DF	JPN	Yoshinori Taguchi (to Urawa Red Diamonds)
—	MF	JPN	Kenji Tomita
—	MF	USA	Daniel Calichman
—	MF	SWE	Jan Jönsson
—	FW	JPN	Shinichirō Takahashi
—	FW	JPN	Ryūji Nagata
—	FW	JPN	Kazuhiro Ogura

== Transfers during the season ==
=== In ===
- (Norway) Tore (on August)
- (Japan) Kazuyori Mochizuki (from Sanfrecce Hiroshima GK coach)

== Awards ==
- J.League Best XI: (Japan) Takuya Takagi

== Other pages ==
- (in Japanese) J. League official site
- (in Japanese) Sanfrecce Hiroshima official site
