= Kenichi Uemura =

Japanese footballer and manager

Kenichi Uemura 上村 健一
Personal information
- Full name: Kenichi Uemura
- Date of birth: April 22, 1974 (age 52)
- Place of birth: Yatsushiro, Kumamoto, Japan
- Height: 1.80 m (5 ft 11 in)
- Position: Defender

Team information
- Current team: Guangzhou Dandelion (head coach)

Youth career
- 1990–1992: Matsunaga High School

Senior career*
Years	Team	Apps	(Gls)
1993–2003	Sanfrecce Hiroshima	251	(23)
2004	Cerezo Osaka	15	(0)
2005–2006	Tokyo Verdy	19	(0)
2006	YSCC Yokohama	0	(0)
2007–2008	Roasso Kumamoto	58	(3)
Total		343	(26)

International career
1996	Japan U-23	2	(1)
2001	Japan	4	(0)

Managerial career
- 2019: Kamatamare Sanuki
- 2024–2025: China U-17
- 2026–: Guangzhou Dandelion
Medal record
Men's football
Representing Japan
FIFA Confederations Cup
Runner-up	2001 Korea/Japan
- * Club domestic league appearances and goals

Kenichi Uemura (上村 健一, Uemura Kenichi; born April 22, 1974) is a former Japanese football player and manager. He played for the Japan national team.

== Club career ==
Uemura was born in Yatsushiro on April 22, 1974. After graduating from Matsunaga High School, he joined J1 League side Sanfrecce Hiroshima in 1993. He broke into the first team in the first season. His first league appearance came on July 4, 1993 against Verdy Kawasaki at Kawasaki Todoroki Stadium. He scored his first professional goal on July 24, 1993 against Urawa Reds at Hiroshima Stadium. He played in many matches as defender from his first season, except at times when he was injured.

After 11 year's long service at Sanfrecce Hiroshima, he moved to Cerezo Osaka in 2004, then Tokyo Verdy (2005–2006). After a brief spell at YSCC Yokohama, he joined Rosso Kumamoto (later Roasso Kumamoto) in 2007. He damaged his knee ligaments three times and experienced seven operations. These injuries have affected his form. Uemura retired from professional football after the 2008 season.

== National team career ==
He represented the Japan U-23 national team at the 1996 Summer Olympics. He played in 2 matches. He scored a goal in a group stage match against Hungary. Although Japan won 2 matches, Japan exited in the first round. Japan beat Brazil in their first game. It was known as the "Miracle of Miami" (マイアミの奇跡) in Japan.

In April 2001, Uemura was selected by the Japan national team. National team manager Philippe Troussier gave him his first full international cap on April 25 in a friendly against Spain in Córdoba. He was a member of the Japan team for the 2001 Confederations Cup. He played three games and Japan won second place. He played 4 games for Japan in 2001.

== Coaching career ==
After the retirement, Uemura started coaching career at J2 League club Roasso Kumamoto in 2009. In 2013, he moved to J2 club Kamatamare Sanuki and served as coach under manager Makoto Kitano. However the club was relegated to J3 League end of 2018 season. In 2019, Uemura became a manager as Kitano successor.

== Career statistics ==
=== Club ===
Appearances and goals by club, season and competition
Club	Season	League			Emperor's Cup		J.League Cup		Total	
Club	Season	Division	Apps	Goals	Apps	Goals	Apps	Goals	Apps	Goals
Sanfrecce Hiroshima	1993	J1 League	17	1	2	0	6	0	25	1
Sanfrecce Hiroshima	1994	J1 League	26	0	2	0	1	0	29	0
Sanfrecce Hiroshima	1995	J1 League	46	4	4	0	-		50	4
Sanfrecce Hiroshima	1996	J1 League	12	2	0	0	7	0	19	2
Sanfrecce Hiroshima	1997	J1 League	3	0	0	0	0	0	3	0
Sanfrecce Hiroshima	1998	J1 League	17	0	3	0	0	0	20	0
Sanfrecce Hiroshima	1999	J1 League	29	7	5	1	4	1	38	9
Sanfrecce Hiroshima	2000	J1 League	28	6	2	0	3	0	33	6
Sanfrecce Hiroshima	2001	J1 League	25	2	2	0	5	0	32	2
Sanfrecce Hiroshima	2002	J1 League	10	1	4	0	0	0	14	1
Sanfrecce Hiroshima	2003	J2 League	38	0	4	0	-		42	0
Cerezo Osaka	2004	J1 League	15	0	0	0	6	0	21	0
Tokyo Verdy	2005	J1 League	18	0	1	0	4	0	23	0
Tokyo Verdy	2006	J2 League	1	0	0	0	-		1	0
YSCC Yokohama	2006	Regional Leagues	0	0	-		-		0	0
Rosso Kumamoto	2007	Football League	30	3	1	0	-		31	3
Roasso Kumamoto	2008	J2 League	28	0	0	0	-		28	0
Career total			343	26	30	1	36	1	409	28

=== International ===
Japan national team
Year	Apps	Goals
2001	4	0
Total	4	0

== Managerial statistics ==
Update; December 31, 2018

Team	From	To	Record				
Team	From	To	G	W	D	L	Win %
Kamatamare Sanuki	2019	present					
Total			0	0	0	0	—

== Honors and awards ==
=== Team Honors ===
- FIFA Confederations Cup Runners-Up: 2001
