= Naoki Naito =

Japanese footballer (born 1968)

Naoki Naito 内藤 直樹
Personal information
- Full name: Naoki Naito
- Date of birth: May 30, 1968 (age 58)
- Place of birth: Shizuoka, Shizuoka, Japan
- Height: 1.80 m (5 ft 11 in)
- Position: Defender

Youth career
- 1984–1986: Tokai University Daiichi High School
- 1987–1990: Chuo University

Senior career*
Years	Team	Apps	(Gls)
1991–1992	Hitachi	20	(2)
1992–1995	Shimizu S-Pulse	94	(2)
1996	Sanfrecce Hiroshima	26	(0)
1997–1998	Vissel Kobe	23	(0)
Total		163	(4)
Medal record
Shimizu S-Pulse
Runner-up	J.League Cup	1992
Runner-up	J.League Cup	1993
Sanfrecce Hiroshima
Runner-up	Emperor's Cup	1996
- * Club domestic league appearances and goals

Naoki Naito (内藤 直樹, Naito Naoki; born May 30, 1968) is a former Japanese football player.

== Playing career ==
Naito was born in Shizuoka on May 30, 1968. After graduating from Chuo University, he joined Hitachi in 1991. He played many matches as defender from first season. In 1992, he moved to new club Shimizu S-Pulse based in his local. He played as regular player and the club won the 2nd place in 1992 and 1993 J.League Cup. In 1996, he moved to Sanfrecce Hiroshima. He played as regular player and the club won the 2nd place in 1996 Emperor's Cup. In 1997, he moved to newly was promoted to J1 League club, Vissel Kobe. However his opportunity to play decreased and he retired end of 1998 season.

== Club statistics ==
Club performance			League		Cup		League Cup		Total	
Season	Club	League	Apps	Goals	Apps	Goals	Apps	Goals	Apps	Goals
Japan			League		Emperor's Cup		J.League Cup		Total	
1991/92	Hitachi	JSL Division 1	20	2			1	0	21	2
1992	Shimizu S-Pulse	J1 League	-		3	0	7	1	10	1
1993	Shimizu S-Pulse	J1 League	26	0	1	0	7	1	34	1
1994	Shimizu S-Pulse	J1 League	28	2	0	0	1	0	29	2
1995	Shimizu S-Pulse	J1 League	40	0	1	0	-		41	0
1996	Sanfrecce Hiroshima	J1 League	26	0	5	0	13	0	44	0
1997	Vissel Kobe	J1 League	18	0	2	0	4	0	24	0
1998	Vissel Kobe	J1 League	5	0	0	0	2	0	7	0
Total			163	4	12	0	35	2	210	6
