= Noh Jung-yoon =

South Korean footballer (born 1971)

Noh Jung-Yoon 노정윤
Personal information
- Full name: Noh Jung-yoon
- Date of birth: March 28, 1971 (age 55)
- Place of birth: Incheon, South Korea
- Height: 1.70 m (5 ft 7 in)
- Position: Midfielder

Youth career
- 1986–1988: Bupyeong High School
- 1989–1992: Korea University

Senior career*
Years	Team	Apps	(Gls)
1993–1997	Sanfrecce Hiroshima	138	(36)
1998	NAC Breda	25	(1)
1999–2001	Cerezo Osaka	64	(5)
2001–2002	Avispa Fukuoka	46	(7)
2003–2004	Busan I'cons	47	(3)
2005–2006	Ulsan Hyundai	31	(0)
Total		351	(52)

International career^{‡}
1987	South Korea U-17		
1991–1992	South Korea U-23	28	(8)
1990–2000	South Korea	45	(5)
- * Club domestic league appearances and goals as of 26 April 2007 ‡ National team caps and goals as of 25 March 2007

- Noh Jung-yoon
- Hangul: 노정윤
- Hanja: 盧廷潤
- RR: No Jeongyun
- MR: No Chŏngyun

Noh Jung-yoon
Medal record

Representing South Korea

Men's football

Asian Games
Bronze medal – third place	1990 Beijing	Team

Noh Jung-yoon (born March 28, 1971) is a South Korean footballer who spent almost his whole career in the J1 League, with a spell in the Dutch League. The midfielder was the first Korean player to play in the J1 League when he moved to Japan in 1992 when the J1 League was newly formed.

The former South Korea national team midfielder has played for Sanfrecce Hiroshima, NAC Breda, Cerezo Osaka, and Avispa Fukuoka.

== Club statistics ==
Club performance			League		Cup		League Cup		Continental		Total	
Season	Club	League	Apps	Goals	Apps	Goals	Apps	Goals	Apps	Goals	Apps	Goals
Japan			League		Emperor's Cup		J.League Cup		Asia		Total	
1993	Sanfrecce Hiroshima	J1 League	28	6	4	2	2	1	—		34	9
1994	Sanfrecce Hiroshima	J1 League	36	10	3	0	1	0	—		40	10
1995	Sanfrecce Hiroshima	J1 League	38	13	5	1	—		—		43	14
1996	Sanfrecce Hiroshima	J1 League	24	5	5	2	4	0	—		33	7
1997	Sanfrecce Hiroshima	J1 League	12	2	2	1	3	0	—		17	3
Netherlands			League		KNVB Cup		League Cup		Europe		Total	
1997–98	NAC Breda	Eredivisie	9	0								
1998–99	NAC Breda	Eredivisie	16	1								
Japan			League		Emperor's Cup		J.League Cup		Asia		Total	
1999	Cerezo Osaka	J1 League	27	0	2	0	2	0	—		31	0
2000	Cerezo Osaka	J1 League	25	4	1	0	4	0	—		30	4
2001	Cerezo Osaka	J1 League	12	1	0	0	1	0	—		13	1
2001	Avispa Fukuoka	J1 League	13	2	0	0	0	0	—		13	2
2002	Avispa Fukuoka	J2 League	33	5	0	0	0	0	—		33	5
Korea Republic			League		FA Cup		League Cup		Asia		Total	
2003	Busan I'cons	K-League	27	2	0	0	—		—		27	2
2004	Busan I'cons	K-League	20	1	1	2	10	3	—		31	6
2005	Ulsan Hyundai	K-League	23	0	1	0	12	0	—		36	0
2006	Ulsan Hyundai	K-League	8	0	0	0	0	0	?	?		
Country	Japan		248	48	22	6	17	1	—		287	55
Country	Netherlands		25	1								
Country	Korea Republic		78	3	2	2	22	3				
Total			351	52								

== National team statistics ==
South Korea national team
Year	Apps	Goals
1990	8	1
1991	0	0
1992	1	0
1993	8	1
1994	5	0
1995	0	0
1996	0	0
1997	0	0
1998	5	0
1999	5	1
2000	13	2
Total	45	5

Results list South Korea's goal tally first.

Date	Venue	Opponent	Score	Result	Competition
September 25, 1990	Beijing, China	Pakistan	1 goal	7–0	1990 Asian Games
June 5, 1993	Seoul, South Korea	Hong Kong	1 goal	4–1	1994 FIFA World Cup qualification
June 19, 1999	Seoul, South Korea	Croatia	1 goal	1–1	1999 Korea Cup
October 7, 2000	Dubai, UAE	Australia	1 goal	4–2	2000 LG Cup
October 13, 2000	Tripoli, Lebanon	China	1 goal	2–2	2000 AFC Asian Cup
