= Antônio Carlos (footballer, born 1964) =

Brazilian footballer (born 1964)

Antonio Carlos
Personal information
- Full name: Antônio Carlos Santos
- Date of birth: 8 June 1964 (age 62)
- Place of birth: Rio de Janeiro, Brazil
- Height: 1.79 m (5 ft 10 1/2 in)
- Position: Midfielder

Senior career*
Years	Team	Apps	(Gls)
1980–1985	Fluminense	?	(?)
1985–1987	Botafogo	?	(?)
1987–1992	América	154	(37)
1992–1993	Porto	10	(2)
1993–1994	América	33	(10)
1994–1995	UANL	25	(3)
1995–1996	Veracruz	33	(15)
1996–1997	Sanfrecce Hiroshima	10	(3)
1998	Santos Laguna	32	(10)
1999	Atlético Morelia	8	(1)
1999	Atlante	9	(3)
Total		314	(84)
- * Club domestic league appearances and goals

Antônio Carlos Santos (born 8 June 1964) is a Brazilian former footballer. He played the bulk of his career for Club América in Mexico.

He was a commentator of Liga MX games for the Mexican television network TV Azteca as well as co-hosted the network's flagship sports program, Los Protagonistas (The Protagonists).

== Honours ==
Club América

- Primera División: 1987–88, 1988–89
- Campeón de Campeones: 1987–88, 1988–1989
- CONCACAF Champions Cup: 1987, 1990, 1992
- Copa Interamericana: 1991

Individual

- Mexican Balón de Oro: 1987–88
