= 1995 Emperor's Cup =

Association football tournament in Japan

Tournament details
- Country: Japan

Final positions
- Champions: Nagoya Grampus Eight
- Runners-up: Sanfrecce Hiroshima
- Semifinalists: Kashima Antlers; Gamba Osaka

Statistics of Emperor's Cup in the 1995 season.

== Overview ==
It was contested by 32 teams, and Nagoya Grampus Eight (managed by Arsène Wenger) won the championship.

== Results ==
=== First round ===
- Yokohama Marinos 3–2 Honda
- Fujitsu 2–5 Fukuoka Blux
- Cerezo Osaka 2–0 Hannan University
- Tokyo Gas 0–1 Kashima Antlers
- Júbilo Iwata 5–1 Hiroshima University
- Vissel Kobe 2–0 Shimizu S-Pulse
- Yokohama Flügels 3–2 Tosu Futures
- Kyoto Purple Sanga 1–2 Nagoya Grampus Eight
- Urawa Red Diamonds 2–0 Sapporo University
- Toshiba 1–2 Kashiwa Reysol
- Gamba Osaka 3–1 Hokuriku Electric Power
- Brummell Sendai 2–1 JEF United Ichihara
- Bellmare Hiratsuka 3–0 Nippon Denso
- Komazawa University 2–3 Sanfrecce Hiroshima
- Seino Transportation SC 0–2 Tsukuba University
- Otsuka Pharmaceutical 0–1 Verdy Kawasaki

=== Second round ===
- Yokohama Marinos 0–1 Fukuoka Blux
- Cerezo Osaka 1–2 Kashima Antlers
- Júbilo Iwata 0–2 Vissel Kobe
- Yokohama Flügels 1–4 Nagoya Grampus Eight
- Urawa Red Diamonds 1–0 Kashiwa Reysol
- Gamba Osaka 4–1 Brummell Sendai
- Bellmare Hiratsuka 0–1 Sanfrecce Hiroshima
- Tsukuba University 0–4 Verdy Kawasaki

=== Quarter-finals ===
- Fukuoka Blux 2–3 Kashima Antlers
- Vissel Kobe 0–2 Nagoya Grampus Eight
- Urawa Red Diamonds 1–2 Gamba Osaka
- Sanfrecce Hiroshima 1–0 Verdy Kawasaki

=== Semi-finals ===
- Kashima Antlers 1–5 Nagoya Grampus Eight
- Gamba Osaka 1–2 Sanfrecce Hiroshima

=== Final ===
- Nagoya Grampus Eight 3–0 Sanfrecce Hiroshima

Nagoya Grampus Eight won the championship.
