= 1996 Emperor's Cup =

Tournament details
- Country: Japan
- Teams: 80

Final positions
- Champions: Verdy Kawasaki (4th title)
- Runners-up: Sanfrecce Hiroshima
- Semifinalists: Urawa Red Diamonds; Gamba Osaka

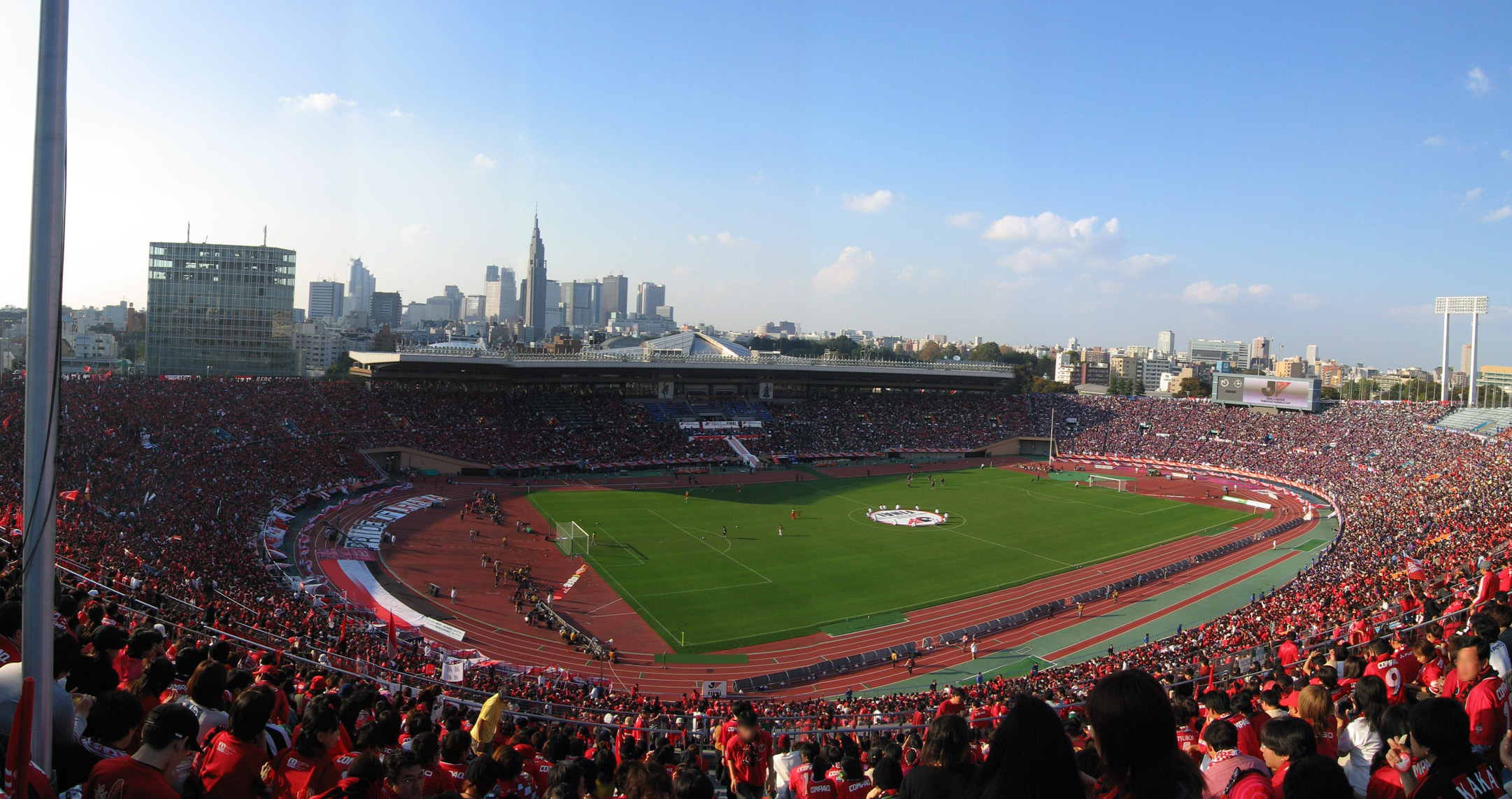
National Olympic Stadium in Tokyo (2004), the venue for the final of the 1996 Emperor's Cup.

Statistics of Emperor's Cup in the 1996 season.

== Overview ==
It was contested by 80 teams, and Verdy Kawasaki won the championship.

== Results ==
=== First round ===
- Denso 3–1 Juntendo University
- Blaze Kumamoto 2–1 Kwansei Gakuin University
- World Blitz Oyama 0–7 Vissel Kobe
- Nippon Bunri University 1–3 Mitsubishi Motors Mizushima
- Kaiho Bank SC 0–4 Montedio Yamagata
- Renaiss Gakuen Koga SC 1–1 (PK 5–3) Hokkaido University
- Morioka Zebra 0–5 Fujitsu
- Fukuoka University 2–2 (PK 5–4) Albireo Niigata
- Kawasoe Club 2–5 Ventforet Kofu
- FC Matsue 0–9 Kokushikan University
- Matsuyama University 0–11 Brummell Sendai
- Tokai University 1–0 Osaka University of Commerce
- Wakayama University 0–3 Consadole Sapporo
- Gonohe City Hall 2–1 Sanyo FC
- Fukushima 2–1 Hitachi Shimizu SC
- Teihens FC 0–4 Tsukuba University
- NTT Kanto 2–0 Doshisha University
- YKK AP SC 0–5 Waseda University
- Mind House Yokkaichi 1–5 Tokyo Gas
- FC Ueda Gentian 1–2 Kunimi High School
- Central Chugoku 0–3 Tosu Futures
- Sony Sendai 2–1 Hiroshima Teachers
- Tenri University 0–1 Cosmo Oil Yokkaichi FC
- Prima Ham Tsuchiura 2–3 Komazawa University
- Tokushima Shogyo High School 1–5 Oita Trinity
- Volca Kagoshima 3–1 TDK
- Yamagata FC 1–7 Otsuka Pharmaceutical
- Kochi University 8–1 Miyazaki Teachers
- Aoyama Gakuin University 0–4 Honda
- Toa University 3–4 Kagawa Shiun Club
- Maruoka High School 0–4 Seino Transportation SC
- Yonago Higashi High School 0–4 Kansai University

=== Second round ===
- Denso 3–1 Blaze Kumamoto
- Vissel Kobe 4–2 Mitsubishi Motors Mizushima
- Montedio Yamagata 6–0 Renaiss Gakuen Koga SC
- Fujitsu 3–0 Fukuoka University
- Ventforet Kofu 1–2 Kokushikan University
- Brummell Sendai 4–1 Tokai University
- Consadole Sapporo 4–0 Gonohe City Hall
- Fukushima 3–0 Tsukuba University
- NTT Kanto 1–0 Waseda University
- Tokyo Gas 8–0 Kunimi High School
- Tosu Futures 5–2 Sony Sendai
- Cosmo Oil Yokkaichi FC 3–0 Komazawa University
- Oita Trinity 6–1 Volca Kagoshima
- Otsuka Pharmaceutical 2–1 Kochi University
- Honda 3–2 Kagawa Shiun Club
- Seino Transportation SC 1–2 Kansai University

=== Third round ===
- Yokohama Flügels 4–0 Denso
- Kyoto Purple Sanga 4–3 Vissel Kobe
- Gamba Osaka 4–1 Montedio Yamagata
- JEF United Ichihara 0–0 (PK 4–5) Fujitsu
- Kashiwa Reysol 1–0 Kokushikan University
- Sanfrecce Hiroshima 2–0 Brummell Sendai
- Shimizu S-Pulse 1–0 Consadole Sapporo
- Júbilo Iwata 1–2 Fukushima
- Urawa Red Diamonds 3–0 NTT Kanto
- Cerezo Osaka 3–1 Tokyo Gas
- Bellmare Hiratsuka 1–0 Tosu Futures
- Nagoya Grampus Eight 0–1 Cosmo Oil Yokkaichi FC
- Verdy Kawasaki 4–0 Oita Trinity
- Yokohama Marinos 1–2 Otsuka Pharmaceutical
- Avispa Fukuoka 3–1 Honda
- Kashima Antlers 2–0 Kansai University

=== Fourth round ===
- Yokohama Flügels 0–1 Kyoto Purple Sanga
- Gamba Osaka 3–1 Fujitsu
- Kashiwa Reysol 1–2 Sanfrecce Hiroshima
- Shimizu S-Pulse 2–1 Fukushima
- Urawa Red Diamonds 4–0 Cerezo Osaka
- Bellmare Hiratsuka 3–1 Cosmo Oil Yokkaichi FC
- Verdy Kawasaki 4–0 Otsuka Pharmaceutical
- Avispa Fukuoka 0–2 Kashima Antlers

=== Quarterfinals ===
- Kyoto Purple Sanga 2–3 Gamba Osaka
- Sanfrecce Hiroshima 3–0 Shimizu S-Pulse
- Urawa Red Diamonds 3–0 Bellmare Hiratsuka
- Verdy Kawasaki 2–1 Kashima Antlers

=== Semifinals ===
- Gamba Osaka 0–2 Sanfrecce Hiroshima
- Urawa Red Diamonds 0–3 Verdy Kawasaki

=== Final ===
- Sanfrecce Hiroshima 0–3 Verdy Kawasaki

Verdy Kawasaki won the championship.
