= 2010 Consadole Sapporo season =

Consadole Sapporo
2010 season
- Manager: Nobuhiro Ishizaki
- Stadium: Sapporo Dome
- J. League 2: 13th
- Emperor's Cup: 3rd Round
- Top goalscorer: Hiroyuki Nishijima (5); Yoshihiro Uchimura (5); Hiroyuki Furuta (5)

2010 Consadole Sapporo season

== Competitions ==
Competitions	Position
J. League 2	13th / 19 clubs
Emperor's Cup	3rd Round

== Player statistics ==
No.	Pos.	Player	D.o.B. (Age)	Height / Weight	J. League 2		Emperor's Cup		Total	
No.	Pos.	Player	D.o.B. (Age)	Height / Weight	Apps	Goals	Apps	Goals	Apps	Goals
1	GK	Yuya Satō	February 10, 1986 (aged 24)	cm / kg	3	0				
2	DF	Mitsuyuki Yoshihiro	May 4, 1985 (aged 24)	cm / kg	19	0				
3	DF	Ryuji Fujiyama	June 9, 1973 (aged 36)	cm / kg	31	0				
4	DF	Naoki Ishikawa	September 13, 1985 (aged 24)	cm / kg	31	0				
5	DF	Yoshinobu Minowa	June 2, 1976 (aged 33)	cm / kg	0	0				
6	DF	Hiroyuki Nishijima	April 7, 1982 (aged 27)	cm / kg	33	5				
7	MF	Seiya Fujita	June 2, 1987 (aged 22)	cm / kg	30	3				
8	MF	Makoto Sunakawa	August 10, 1977 (aged 32)	cm / kg	27	1				
9	FW	Masashi Nakayama	September 23, 1967 (aged 42)	cm / kg	12	0				
10	FW	Hiroki Miyazawa	June 28, 1989 (aged 20)	cm / kg	28	2				
11	FW	Yusuke Kondo	December 5, 1984 (aged 25)	cm / kg	26	3				
13	FW	Yoshihiro Uchimura	August 24, 1984 (aged 25)	cm / kg	28	5				
15	DF	Cho Sung-Hwan	April 9, 1982 (aged 27)	cm / kg	0	0				
16	MF	Ri Han-Jae	June 27, 1982 (aged 27)	cm / kg	2	0				
17	MF	Yasuaki Okamoto	April 9, 1988 (aged 21)	cm / kg	17	2				
18	MF	Hironobu Haga	December 21, 1982 (aged 27)	cm / kg	35	0				
19	FW	Thiago Quirino	January 4, 1985 (aged 25)	cm / kg	17	2				
20	MF	Kazumasa Uesato	March 13, 1986 (aged 23)	cm / kg	28	4				
21	GK	Toshiyasu Takahara	October 18, 1980 (aged 29)	cm / kg	34	0				
23	DF	Shunsuke Iwanuma	June 2, 1988 (aged 21)	cm / kg	19	0				
24	FW	Junki Yokono	October 7, 1989 (aged 20)	cm / kg	10	0				
25	DF	Shuhei Hotta	May 12, 1989 (aged 20)	cm / kg	2	0				
26	FW	Shinya Uehara	September 29, 1986 (aged 23)	cm / kg	9	0				
27	MF	Hiroyuki Furuta	May 23, 1991 (aged 18)	cm / kg	23	5				
28	GK	Yuya Hikichi	September 2, 1990 (aged 19)	cm / kg	0	0				
29	MF	Park Jin-Soo	March 1, 1987 (aged 23)	cm / kg	2	0				
31	FW	Yōsuke Mikami	May 5, 1992 (aged 17)	cm / kg	10	3				
32	MF	Jumpei Takaki	September 1, 1982 (aged 27)	cm / kg	19	1				
33	MF	Takuma Arano	April 20, 1993 (aged 16)	cm / kg	2	0				

== Other pages ==
- (in Japanese) J. League official site
