= 2012 Consadole Sapporo season =

Consadole Sapporo
2012 season
- Chairman: Takemi Yahagi
- Manager: Nobuhiro Ishizaki
- J. League Division 1: 18th (relegated)
- Emperor's Cup: Second round
- J. League Cup: Group stage
Home colours	Away colours

The 2012 Consadole Sapporo season was Consadole Sapporo's 1st season in J. League Division 1 since 2008, hence the club's 8th overall in the top flight. Consadole Sapporo are also competing in the 2012 Emperor's Cup and 2012 J. League Cup.

== Competitions ==
=== J. League ===
==== League table ====
Pos	Team	Pld	W	D	L	GF	GA	GD	Pts	Qualification or relegation
14	Cerezo Osaka	34	11	9	14	47	53	−6	42	
15	Albirex Niigata	34	10	10	14	29	34	−5	40	
16	Vissel Kobe (R)	34	11	6	17	41	50	−9	39	Relegation to 2013 J.League Division 2
17	Gamba Osaka (R)	34	9	11	14	67	65	+2	38	Relegation to 2013 J.League Division 2
18	Consadole Sapporo (R)	34	4	2	28	25	88	−63	14	Relegation to 2013 J.League Division 2

Updated to match(es) played on 1 December 2012. Source: J.League Division 1
Rules for classification: 1) points; 2) goal difference; 3) number of goals scored.
(R) Relegated

==== Matches ====
10 March 2012 1	Consadole Sapporo	0–0	Jubilo Iwata	Sapporo Dome
14:04		Report		Attendance: 25,353; Referee: Hirose

17 March 2012 2	Vissel Kobe	2–1	Consadole Sapporo	HOME'S Stadium Kobe
17:06	Kondo 22'; Tokura 83'	Report	7' Yamamoto	Attendance: 14,036; Referee: Iida

24 March 2012 3	Consadole Sapporo	1–2	Urawa Red Diamonds	Sapporo Dome
16:03	Yamamoto 32'	Report	45+1', 63' Kashiwagi	Attendance: 20,192; Referee: Murakami

31 March 2012 4	Shimizu S-Pulse	1–0	Consadole Sapporo	OUTSOURCING Stadium Nihondaira
18:34	Takagi 49'	Report		Attendance: 14,216; Referee: Takayama

7 April 2012 5	Consadole Sapporo	0–2	Kashiwa Reysol	Sapporo Dome
		Report	Kudo 33'; Tanaka (yellow card) 55'; Kondo 63'; Barada (yellow card) 90+3'	Attendance: 14,023; Referee: Masaaki Iemoto

14 April 2012 6	Nagoya Grampus	3–1	Consadole Sapporo	Mizuho Athletic Stadium
	Kanazaki 3'; Nara 15' (o.g.); Abe (yellow card) 66'; Tamada 77'	Report	Takaki (yellow card) 87'; Furuta 89'	Attendance: 12,896; Referee: Futoshi Nakamura

21 April 2012 7	Consadole Sapporo	2–3	Kawasaki Frontale	Sapporo Dome
	Maeda 9' (yellow card) 75'; Takaki 32'	Report	Nakamura 57'; Renatinho 67' (pen.); Yamase 88'	Attendance: 11,119; Referee: Nobutsugu Murakami

28 April 2012 8	Omiya Ardija	2–1	Consadole Sapporo	NACK5 Stadium Omiya
	Carlinhos Paraíba 10'; Aoki 71'	Report	Takaki 45+1'; Maeda (yellow card) 85'	Attendance: 8,435; Referee: Yudai Yamamoto

3 May 2012 9	Consadole Sapporo	1–0	Cerezo Osaka	Sapporo Dome
	Kondo 25'; Kawai (yellow card) 28'; Miyazawa (yellow card) 78'; Kushibiki (yellow card) 88'	Report	Sakaemoto (yellow card) 15'; Branquinho (yellow card) 39'; Fujimoto (yellow card) 44'; Ogihara (yellow card) 76'	Attendance: 9,596; Referee: Hiroyuki Kimura

6 May 2012 10	Yokohama F. Marinos	2–1	Consadole Sapporo	Nissan Stadium
	Nakamura 22'; Taniguchi 78'	Report	Lee Ho-Seung (yellow card) 22'; Furuta 26'; Kushibiki (yellow card) 85'	Attendance: 24,183; Referee: Yoshiro Imamura

12 May 2012 11	Consadole Sapporo	0–1	F.C. Tokyo	Sapporo Dome
	Kawai (yellow card) 75'	Report	Kajiyama 1'; Ota (yellow card) 45+1'; Lucas (yellow card) 48'	Attendance: 10,816; Referee: Hajime Matsuo

19 May 2012 12	Kashima Antlers	7–0	Consadole Sapporo	Kashima Soccer Stadium
17:00 (UTC+08)	Iwamasa 9'; Osako 15' (pen.); Yamamura 40'; Koroki 61'; Motoyama 74'; Juninho 82'; Endo 89'	Report	North (yellow card) 15'; Kushibiki (yellow card) 45+1'	Attendance: 13,915; Referee: Hiroyoshi Takayama

26 May 2012 13	Consadole Sapporo	1–3	Sanfrecce Hiroshima	Sapporo Dome
14:00 (UTC+08)	Uchimura 50'; Nara (yellow card) 68'	Report	Satō 21'; Yamagishi 27'; Kōji Morisaki 83'	Attendance: 6,870; Referee: Jumpei Lida

16 June 2012 14	Vegalta Sendai	4–1	Consadole Sapporo	Yurtec Stadium Sendai
13:30 (UTC+08)	Yanagisawa 45+1', 47'; Wilson 56' (yellow card) 75'; Nakahara 72'; Sugai (yellow card) 81'	Report	Kamata 49' (o.g.); Okayama (yellow card) 51'	Attendance: 13,554; Referee: Koichiro Fukushima

23 June 2012 15	Consadole Sapporo	0–4	Gamba Osaka	Sapporo Dome
14:00 (UTC+08)	Hidaka (yellow card) 31'; Kawai (yellow card) 83'	Report	Paulinho 16'; Kurata 26'; Endō 35' (pen.); Uchida (yellow card) 37'; Takei 90+3'	Attendance: 14,759; Referee: Tomoya Maeda

30 June 2012 16	Sagan Tosu	1–0	Consadole Sapporo	Tosu Stadium
19:00 (UTC+08)	Mizunuma 90+5'	Report	North (yellow card) 47'; Sugiyama (yellow card) 70'; Okayama (yellow card) 90+3'	Attendance: 10,345; Referee: Hiroyuki Kimura

7 July 2012 17	Consadole Sapporo	0–1	Albirex Niigata	Sapporo Dome
14:00 (UTC+08)		Report	Tanaka 5'; Mikado (yellow card) 31'; Murakami (yellow card) 48'	Attendance: 7,673; Referee: Yudai Yamamoto

14 July 2012 18	Jubilo Iwata	4–1	Consadole Sapporo	Yamaha Stadium
19:00 (UTC+08)	Cho Byung-Kuk 25', 29'; Maeda 48'; Rodrigo Souto 52'	Report	Hidaka 49'	Attendance: 11,367; Referee: Koichiro Fukushima

28 July 2012 19	Consadole Sapporo	2–1	Nagoya Grampus	Sapporo Dome
16:00 (UTC+08)	Yamamoto 55'; Kim Jae-Hwan (yellow card) 67'; Uehara 90+2'	Report	Tanaka 58'; Taguchi (yellow card) 84'; Yoshimura (yellow card) 90+2'	Attendance: 8,360; Referee: Kenji Ogiya

4 August 2012 20	Cerezo Osaka	4–0	Consadole Sapporo	Kincho Stadium
19:00 (UTC+08)	Murata 37'; Kurogi (yellow card) 45+1'; Kakitani 54'; Maruhashi (yellow card) 64'; Kempes 68', 90'	Report	Nara (yellow card) 31'; Hidaka (yellow card) 88'	Attendance: 8,226; Referee: Futoshi Nakamura

11 August 2012 21	Consadole Sapporo	2–1	Vegalta Sendai	Sapporo Dome
14:00 (UTC+08)	Hidaka 79'; Watanabe 90+4' (o.g.)	Report	Watanabe 12'	Attendance: 11,945; Referee: Nobutsugu Murakami

18 August 2012 22	Consadole Sapporo	2–4	Vissel Kobe	Sapporo Dome
14:00 (UTC+08)	Furuta (yellow card) 49'; Uchimura (yellow card) 59'; Alcides Pinto de Melo Junior 66' (pen.) (yellow card) 66'; Uehara 74'	Report	Tashiro 2'; Nozawa 53', 82'; Mogi (yellow card) 65'; Tokura 83'	Attendance: 8,117; Referee: Yuichi Nishimura

25 August 2012 23	Gamba Osaka	7–2	Consadole Sapporo	Osaka Expo '70 Stadium
19:00 (UTC+08)	Sato 16'; Leandro 26', 45', 57'; Konno 68'; Ienaga 90+3'	Report	Hidaka 18'; Kim Jae-Hoan (yellow card) 53'; Uehara 71'	Attendance: 15,056; Referee: Itaru Hirose

1 September 2012 24	Consadole Sapporo	0–2	Shimizu S-Pulse	Sapporo Dome
14:00 (UTC+08)	Miyazawa (yellow card) 75'; North (yellow card) 88'	Report	Kohei Hattanda (yellow card) 19'; Takagi 38'; Omae 44'; Ishige (yellow card) 85'	Attendance: 10,783; Referee: Jumpei Iida

15 September 2012 25	Kashiwa Reysol	3–1	Consadole Sapporo	Hitachi Kashiwa Soccer Stadium
20:00	Otani 8'; Kudo 39'; Tanaka 90+4'	Report	Uchimura (yellow card) 16'; Takaki (yellow card) 36'; Shota Sakai 81'	Attendance: 10,445; Referee: Tomoya Maeda

22 September 2012 26	Consadole Sapporo	0–5	Omiya Ardija	Sapporo Dome
15:00	Kim Jae-Hoan (yellow card) 4'; Yamamoto (yellow card) 45+1'; Takaki (red card) 50'	Report	Novaković 51' (pen.), 62', 77'; Carlinhos Paraíba 60'; Murakami (yellow card) 86'; Hasegawa 90+3'	Attendance: 7,474; Referee: Kazuhiko Matsumura

29 September 2012 27	Kawasaki Frontale	1–0	Consadole Sapporo	Todoroki Athletics Stadium
20:00	Renatinho 80'	Report	Okamoto (yellow card) 54'; Kawai (yellow card) 76'	Attendance: 20,909; Referee: Takuto Okabe

6 October 2012 28	Urawa Red Diamonds	1–2	Consadole Sapporo	Saitama Stadium 2002
20:00	Umesaki 86'	Report	Okomoto (yellow card) 10'; Furuta 50', 73'; Kawai (yellow card) 56'; Nara (yellow card) 56'	Attendance: 30,692; Referee: Koichiro Fukushima

20 October 2012 29	Consadole Sapporo	0–0	Kashima Antlers	Sapporo Dome
17:00	Haga (yellow card) 44'; Kushibiki (yellow card) 49' (yellow-red card) 81'	Report

27 October 2012 30	F.C. Tokyo	5–0	Consadole Sapporo	Ajinomoto Stadium
18:00	Jang Hyun-Soo 17'; Tanabe 47'; Ishikawa 59', 64'; Vučićević 81'; Tokunaga (yellow card) 90+5'	Report		Attendance: 20,696; Referee: Yoshiro Imamura

7 November 2012 31	Sanfrecce Hiroshima	3–0	Consadole Sapporo	Hiroshima Big Arch
19:00	Morisaki 17' (yellow card) 73'; Satō 31'; Mizumoto 86'	Report	Kushibiki (yellow card) 16'; Yamamoto (yellow card) 50'	Attendance: 13,204; Referee: Yudai Yamamoto

17 November 2012 32	Consadole Sapporo	2–3	Sagan Tosu	Sapporo Dome
17:00 JST (UTC+9)	Uchimura 45+1'; Haga 56'	Report	Toyoda 54'; Ikeda 67'; Noda 71'	Attendance: 10,266; Referee: Takuya Maeda

24 November 2012 33	Consadole Sapporo	0–2	Yokohama F. Marinos	Sapporo Dome
17:30	Haga (yellow card) 52'	Report	Saitō 33', 50'; Nakamachi (yellow card) 57'; Nakamura (yellow card) 68'	Attendance: 19,587; Referee: Tomohiro Inoue

1 December 2012 34	Albirex Niigata	4–1	Consadole Sapporo	Tohoku Electric Power Big Swan Stadium
15:33 JST	Tsubouchi 8'; Bruno Lopes 43'; Alan Mineiro 71'; Bruno Lopes 80'	Report	Sakaki 53'	Attendance: 28,055; Referee: Hiroyuki Kimura

=== J. League Cup ===
Team	Pld	W	D	L	GF	GA	GD	Pts
Shimizu S-Pulse	6	5	0	1	12	4	+8	15
Kashima Antlers	6	5	0	1	10	5	+5	15
Albirex Niigata	6	3	1	2	6	5	+1	10
Yokohama F. Marinos	6	1	2	3	7	9	−2	5
Omiya Ardija	6	1	2	3	7	10	−3	5
Consadole Sapporo	6	1	2	3	6	11	−5	5
Vissel Kobe	6	1	1	4	6	10	−4	4

20 March 2012 Group B	Consadole Sapporo	0–1	Albirex Niigata	Sapporo Dome
13:04		Report	38' Mineiro	Attendance: 7,487; Referee: Nakamura

4 April 2012 Group B	Yokohama F. Marinos	1–2	Consadole Sapporo	NHK Spring Mitsuzawa Football Stadium
19:33	Matsumoto 68'	Report	6' Oshima; 45+2' Sakaki	Attendance: 7,148; Referee: Fukushima

18 April 2012 Group B	Consadole Sapporo	1–2	Kashima Antlers	Sapporo Dome
19:00	Shota Sakai 16'; Thiago Quirino (yellow card) 32' (yellow-red card) 39'; Miyazawa (yellow card) 85'	Report	Juninho 85' (pen.); Okamoto 90+4'	Attendance: 6,877; Referee: Takuto Okabe

16 May 2012 Group B	Omiya Ardija	1–1	Consadole Sapporo	NACK5 Stadium Omiya
19:00	Kim Young-Gwon 53'	Report	Maeda 88' (yellow card) 89'; Nara (yellow card) 90+4'	Attendance: 4,359; Referee: Tetsuro Yoshida

6 June 2012 Group B	Consadole Sapporo	0–4	Shimizu S-Pulse	Sapporo Dome
19:00		Report	Kawai 2'; Lee Ki-Je 5'; Ishige 57'; Sugiyama 78'	Attendance: 3,687; Referee: Toshimitsu Yoshida

9 June 2012 Group B	Vissel Kobe	2–2	Consadole Sapporo	Home's Stadium Kobe
13:00	Ōkubo 12', 21' (yellow card) 47'	Report	Shota Sakai 35'; Okamoto 38'; Okayama (yellow card) 81'; Osanai (yellow card) 90'	Attendance: 4,083; Referee: Kazuhiko Matsumura

=== Emperor's Cup ===
8 September 2012 Second round	Consadole Sapporo	1–1 (a.e.t.) (3–5 p)	A.C. Nagano Parceiro	Sapporo
13:00	Uehara 69'	Report	Mukai 8'	Stadium: Sapporo Atsubetsu Park Stadium; Attendance: 2,535; Referee: Ryoichi Imamura
