= 2009 Consadole Sapporo season =

Consadole Sapporo
2009 season
- Manager: Nobuhiro Ishizaki
- Stadium: Sapporo Dome
- J. League 2: 6th
- Emperor's Cup: 3rd Round
- Top goalscorer: Thiago Quirino (19)

2009 Consadole Sapporo season

== Competitions ==
Competitions	Position
J. League 2	6th / 18 clubs
Emperor's Cup	3rd Round

== Player statistics ==
No.	Pos.	Player	D.o.B. (Age)	Height / Weight	J. League 2		Emperor's Cup		Total	
No.	Pos.	Player	D.o.B. (Age)	Height / Weight	Apps	Goals	Apps	Goals	Apps	Goals
1	GK	Yuya Satō	February 10, 1986 (aged 23)	cm / kg	5	0				
2	DF	Mitsuyuki Yoshihiro	May 4, 1985 (aged 23)	cm / kg	41	0				
3	DF	Shingo Shibata	July 13, 1985 (aged 23)	cm / kg	2	0				
4	DF	Yushi Soda	July 5, 1978 (aged 30)	cm / kg	1	1				
5	DF	Yoshinobu Minowa	June 2, 1976 (aged 32)	cm / kg	0	0				
6	DF	Hiroyuki Nishijima	April 7, 1982 (aged 26)	cm / kg	47	5				
7	MF	Seiya Fujita	June 2, 1987 (aged 21)	cm / kg	47	3				
8	MF	Makoto Sunakawa	August 10, 1977 (aged 31)	cm / kg	46	3				
9	FW	Kengo Ishii	April 2, 1986 (aged 22)	cm / kg	16	1				
10	MF	Claiton	January 25, 1978 (aged 31)	cm / kg	23	4				
10	MF	Rafael Bastos	January 1, 1985 (aged 24)	cm / kg	17	3				
11	FW	Hiroki Miyazawa	June 28, 1989 (aged 19)	cm / kg	43	5				
13	FW	Genki Nakayama	September 15, 1981 (aged 27)	cm / kg	26	1				
14	MF	Danilson Córdoba	September 6, 1986 (aged 22)	cm / kg	41	6				
15	DF	Cho Sung-Hwan	April 9, 1982 (aged 26)	cm / kg	36	0				
16	GK	Hiroki Aratani	August 6, 1975 (aged 33)	cm / kg	30	0				
17	MF	Yasuaki Okamoto	April 9, 1988 (aged 20)	cm / kg	23	4				
18	MF	Hironobu Haga	December 21, 1982 (aged 26)	cm / kg	34	1				
19	FW	Thiago Quirino	January 4, 1985 (aged 24)	cm / kg	48	19				
20	MF	Kazumasa Uesato	March 13, 1986 (aged 22)	cm / kg	48	6				
21	GK	Toshiyasu Takahara	October 18, 1980 (aged 28)	cm / kg	16	0				
22	DF	Daigo Nishi	August 28, 1987 (aged 21)	cm / kg	41	7				
23	DF	Shunsuke Iwanuma	June 2, 1988 (aged 20)	cm / kg	5	1				
24	FW	Junki Yokono	October 7, 1989 (aged 19)	cm / kg	5	0				
25	DF	Shuhei Hotta	May 12, 1989 (aged 19)	cm / kg	0	0				
26	FW	Shinya Uehara	September 29, 1986 (aged 22)	cm / kg	25	3				
27	MF	Hiroyuki Furuta	May 23, 1991 (aged 17)	cm / kg	19	0				
28	GK	Yuya Hikichi	September 2, 1990 (aged 18)	cm / kg	0	0				
29	DF	Naoki Ishikawa	September 13, 1985 (aged 23)	cm / kg	20	1				

== Other pages ==
- (in Japanese) J. League official site
