= 2008 Consadole Sapporo season =

Consadole Sapporo
2008 season
- Manager: Toshiya Miura
- Stadium: Sapporo Dome
- J. League 1: 18th
- Emperor's Cup: 4th Round
- J. League Cup: GL-C 4th
- Top goalscorer: Davi (16)

2008 Consadole Sapporo season

== Competitions ==
Competitions	Position
J. League 1	18th / 18 clubs
Emperor's Cup	4th Round
J. League Cup	GL-C 4th / 4 clubs

== Domestic results ==
=== J. League 1 ===
Match	Date	Venue	Opponents	Score
1	2008..			-
2	2008..			-
3	2008..			-
4	2008..			-
5	2008..			-
6	2008..			-
7	2008..			-
8	2008..			-
9	2008..			-
10	2008..			-
11	2008..			-
12	2008..			-
13	2008..			-
14	2008..			-
15	2008..			-
16	2008..			-
17	2008..			-
18	2008..			-
19	2008..			-
20	2008..			-
21	2008..			-
22	2008..			-
23	2008..			-
24	2008..			-
25	2008..			-
26	2008..			-
27	2008..			-
28	2008..			-
29	2008..			-
30	2008..			-
31	2008..			-
32	2008..			-
33	2008..			-
34	2008..			-

=== Emperor's Cup ===
Match	Date	Venue	Opponents	Score
4th Round	2008..			-

=== J. League Cup ===
Match	Date	Venue	Opponents	Score
GL-C-1	2008..			-
GL-C-2	2008..			-
GL-C-3	2008..			-
GL-C-4	2008..			-
GL-C-5	2008..			-
GL-C-6	2008..			-

== Player statistics ==
No.	Pos.	Player	D.o.B. (Age)	Height / Weight	J. League 1		Emperor's Cup		J. League Cup		Total	
No.	Pos.	Player	D.o.B. (Age)	Height / Weight	Apps	Goals	Apps	Goals	Apps	Goals	Apps	Goals
1	GK	Yuya Satō	February 10, 1986 (aged 22)	cm / kg	15	0						
2	DF	Mitsuyuki Yoshihiro	May 4, 1985 (aged 22)	cm / kg	9	0						
3	DF	Junji Nishizawa	May 10, 1974 (aged 33)	cm / kg	18	0						
4	DF	Yushi Soda	July 5, 1978 (aged 29)	cm / kg	3	0						
5	DF	Tomohiko Ikeuchi	November 1, 1977 (aged 30)	cm / kg	20	2						
6	DF	Hiroyuki Nishijima	April 7, 1982 (aged 25)	cm / kg	21	2						
7	MF	Seiya Fujita	June 2, 1987 (aged 20)	cm / kg	19	0						
8	MF	Makoto Sunakawa	August 10, 1977 (aged 30)	cm / kg	32	1						
9	FW	Kengo Ishii	April 2, 1986 (aged 21)	cm / kg	9	0						
10	FW	Davi	March 10, 1984 (aged 23)	cm / kg	26	16						
11	FW	Nonato	July 5, 1979 (aged 28)	cm / kg	1	0						
11	FW	Anderson	February 1, 1978 (aged 30)	cm / kg	16	4						
13	FW	Genki Nakayama	September 15, 1981 (aged 26)	cm / kg	22	1						
14	MF	Tomoki Suzuki	June 8, 1985 (aged 22)	cm / kg	0	0						
15	MF	Alceu	May 7, 1984 (aged 23)	cm / kg	0	0						
15	MF	Claiton	January 25, 1978 (aged 30)	cm / kg	30	2						
16	MF	Shinji Otsuka	December 29, 1975 (aged 32)	cm / kg	7	0						
17	MF	Yasuaki Okamoto	April 9, 1988 (aged 19)	cm / kg	13	0						
18	MF	Hironobu Haga	December 21, 1982 (aged 25)	cm / kg	26	0						
19	DF	Shusuke Tsubouchi	May 5, 1983 (aged 24)	cm / kg	30	0						
20	MF	Kazumasa Uesato	March 13, 1986 (aged 21)	cm / kg	12	0						
21	DF	Yasuhiro Hiraoka	May 23, 1986 (aged 21)	cm / kg	14	0						
22	DF	Daigo Nishi	August 28, 1987 (aged 20)	cm / kg	27	3						
23	DF	Shunsuke Iwanuma	June 2, 1988 (aged 19)	cm / kg	0	0						
24	MF	Masaya Nishitani	September 16, 1978 (aged 29)	cm / kg	21	0						
25	FW	Hiroki Miyazawa	June 28, 1989 (aged 18)	cm / kg	6	1						
26	GK	Yasuhiro Tominaga	May 22, 1980 (aged 27)	cm / kg	0	0						
27	FW	Junki Yokono	October 7, 1989 (aged 18)	cm / kg	1	0						
28	GK	Takahiro Takagi	July 1, 1982 (aged 25)	cm / kg	20	0						
29	MF	Jun Marques Davidson	June 7, 1983 (aged 24)	cm / kg	17	0						
30	DF	Shuhei Hotta	May 12, 1989 (aged 18)	cm / kg	0	0						
31	GK	Toshiyasu Takahara	October 18, 1980 (aged 27)	cm / kg	0	0						
32	DF	Shingo Shibata	July 13, 1985 (aged 22)	cm / kg	14	3						
33	MF	Chong Yong-De	February 4, 1978 (aged 30)	cm / kg	11	0						
34	FW	Edson	February 26, 1990 (aged 18)	cm / kg	0	0						
35	DF	Yoshinobu Minowa	June 2, 1976 (aged 31)	cm / kg	12	0						

== Other pages ==
- (in Japanese) J. League official site
