= Masashi Nakayama =

Japanese footballer (born 1967)

Masashi Nakayama 中山 雅史
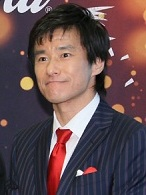
- Nakayama in 2014

Personal information
- Date of birth: 23 September 1967 (age 59)
- Place of birth: Fujieda, Shizuoka, Japan
- Height: 1.78 m (5 ft 10 in)
- Position: Forward

Youth career
- 1983–1985: Fujieda Higashi High School

College career
Years	Team	Apps	(Gls)
1986–1989	University of Tsukuba		

Senior career*
Years	Team	Apps	(Gls)
1990–2009	Júbilo Iwata	419	(207)
2010–2012	Consadole Sapporo	13	(0)
2015–2020	Azul Claro Numazu	0	(0)
Total		432	(207)

International career
1990–2003	Japan	53	(21)

Managerial career
- 2023–2025: Azul Claro Numazu
Medal record
Men's football
Representing Japan
AFC Asian Cup
Winner	1992 Japan
FIFA Confederations Cup
Runner-up	2001 Korea/Japan
- * Club domestic league appearances and goals

Masashi Nakayama (中山 雅史, Nakayama Masashi; born 23 September 1967), nicknamed "Gon" during his playing career, is a Japanese professional football manager and former player. He was the J.League Most Valuable Player in 1998, J.League Top Scorer in 1998 and 2000, and J.League Best XI in 1997, 1998, 2000, 2002.

== Club career ==
Born in Shizuoka, Nakayama attended Fujieda Higashi High School and University of Tsukuba before he joined Yamaha Motors (currently; Júbilo Iwata) of the Japan Soccer League, a precursor to the J1 League, which consisted of company sponsored teams. Playing as a forward, Nakayama made his J1 League debut on 11 March 1994. From then until 2009, he was an ever-present part of the Júbilo Iwata line-up as they were consistently one of the top teams in the J1 League since its inception. With a strike-rate of more than a goal every two games throughout his career, Nakayama was the inspirational and talismanic leader for both Júbilo Iwata and the Japan national team. He holds a record by scoring four hat-tricks in four successive J1 League games, from 15 to 29 April in 1998. He scored 16 times in these games. The record is recognized by the Guinness Book of World Records. He also holds the record for top scorer in a single season, scoring 36 goals in 1998.

On 4 December 2012, he announced his retirement at the age of 45, citing injuries to his both knees, after being J1 League's all-time leading scorer with 157 goals. At the time of his retirement, he had played three seasons for Consadole Sapporo. In September 2015, he began to train with Azul Claro Numazu, later signing for the team as a player. Two years later, having still not made his début for Azul Claro in league or cup competition, his contract was renewed for 2017 season, a first for a professional football club.

== International career ==
At the 1998 FIFA World Cup, Nakayama scored the only goal of the tournament and the first goal for the Japan national team in the history of the World Cup against Jamaica on 26 June 1998. He has scored 21 goals in 53 appearances for the Japan national team.

Nakayama also holds the world record fastest hat-trick at international level. He managed three goals in a 2000 Asian Cup qualification match against Brunei on 16 February 2000 in only three minutes and three seconds, beating the previous record of Englishman Willie Hall set in 1938 (against Northern Ireland) by 27 seconds.

== Managerial career ==
On 13 January 2020, Nakayama announced his retirement as a player at the age of 53. Having been the U-18 coach for Azul Claro Numazu for the prior two years, Nakayama revealed he was appointed the assistant manager of J2 League club Júbilo Iwata. On 13 November 2022, Nakayama returned to J3 League club Azul Claro, where he was appointed manager.

== Personal life ==
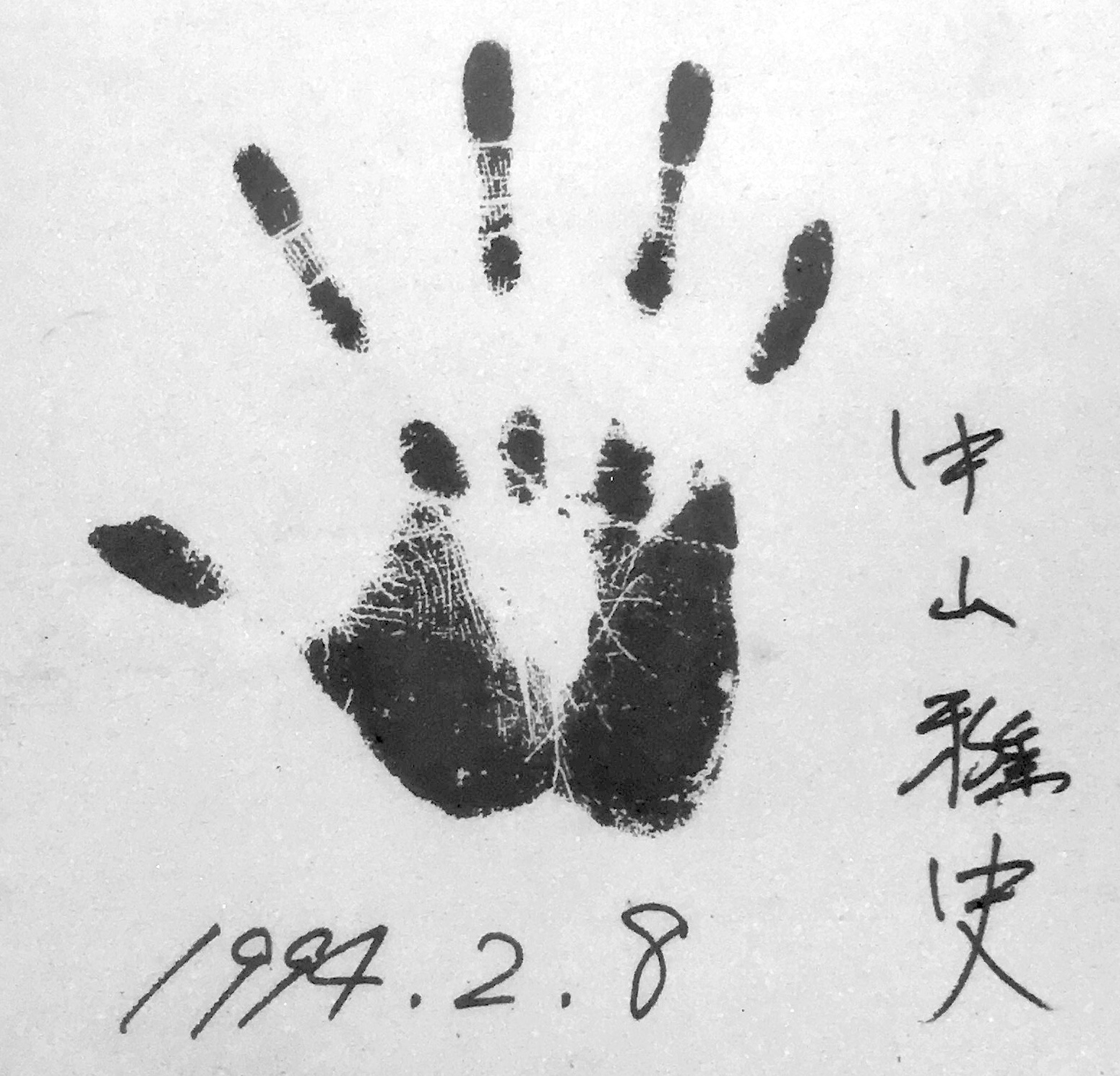
Masashi Nakayama's autograph

Nakayama married actress Tomoko Ikuta in 1996, and together they have a daughter. Ikuta did the voice-over for lead actress Lee Young-ae in the Japanese version of the popular South Korean TV series Jewel in the Palace.

Nakayama portrayed himself on television, performing voice work for a guest role on the anime Hungry Heart: Wild Striker; a fictionalized version of himself also appeared in the manga version of its sister series, Captain Tsubasa. He also portrayed himself in episode 19 of HappinessCharge PreCure!. This episode corresponded with the opening of the World Cup. He appeared on the front cover of the Japanese releases of Konami's Winning Eleven video game series (World Soccer: Winning Eleven 6 and World Soccer: Winning Eleven 6 - Final Evolution) in 2002 and 2003.

== Career statistics ==
=== Club ===
As of the end 2020 season after retirement as player

Appearances and goals by club, season and competition
Club	Season	League			Emperor's Cup		J.League Cup		AFC		Total	
Club	Season	Division	Apps	Goals	Apps	Goals	Apps	Goals	Apps	Goals	Apps	Goals
Júbilo Iwata (Note: "Yamaha Motors" until 1994)	1990–91	JSL Division 1	13	4			2	1	—		15	5
Júbilo Iwata	1991–92	JSL Division 1	18	15			1	0	—		19	15
Júbilo Iwata	1992	Football League	16	13			—		—		16	13
Júbilo Iwata	1993	Football League	18	18	1	0	0	0	—		19	18
Júbilo Iwata	1994	J1 League	12	3	0	0	0	0	—		12	3
Júbilo Iwata	1995	J1 League	45	18	0	0	—		—		45	18
Júbilo Iwata	1996	J1 League	27	9	0	0	13	7	—		40	16
Júbilo Iwata	1997	J1 League	27	18	4	2	11	6	—		42	26
Júbilo Iwata	1998	J1 League	27	36	3	4	0	0	—		30	40
Júbilo Iwata	1999	J1 League	23	6	1	2	1	1	—		25	9
Júbilo Iwata	2000	J1 League	29	20	3	2	4	1	—		36	23
Júbilo Iwata	2001	J1 League	30	16	1	0	8	4	—		39	20
Júbilo Iwata	2002	J1 League	29	16	3	2	7	3	—		39	21
Júbilo Iwata	2003	J1 League	12	3	5	0	2	1	—		19	4
Júbilo Iwata	2004	J1 League	19	3	4	1	5	0	4	1	32	5
Júbilo Iwata	2005	J1 League	29	6	2	0	2	0	1	0	34	6
Júbilo Iwata	2006	J1 League	13	1	1	0	3	1	—		17	2
Júbilo Iwata	2007	J1 League	15	1	2	0	5	1	—		22	2
Júbilo Iwata	2008	J1 League	16	1	2	1	3	1	—		21	3
Júbilo Iwata	2009	J1 League	1	0	1	0	1	0	—		3	0
Consadole Sapporo	2010	J2 League	12	0	1	0	—		—		13	0
Consadole Sapporo	2011	J2 League	0	0	0	0	—		—		0	0
Consadole Sapporo	2012	J1 League	1	0	0	0	0	0	—		1	0
Azul Claro Numazu	2015	Football League	0	0	—		—		—		0	0
Azul Claro Numazu	2016	Football League	0	0	—		—		—		0	0
Azul Claro Numazu	2017	J3 League	0	0	0	0	—		—		0	0
Azul Claro Numazu	2018	J3 League	0	0	0	0	—		—		0	0
Azul Claro Numazu	2019	J3 League					—		—			
Azul Claro Numazu	2020	J3 League					—		—			
Career total			432	207	34	12	68	27	5	1	539	247

=== International ===
Appearances and goals by national team and year
National team	Year	Apps	Goals
Japan	1990	1	0
Japan	1991	0	0
Japan	1992	6	3
Japan	1993	8	4
Japan	1994	0	0
Japan	1995	4	1
Japan	1996	0	0
Japan	1997	2	2
Japan	1998	10	4
Japan	1999	1	0
Japan	2000	7	6
Japan	2001	8	1
Japan	2002	3	0
Japan	2003	3	0
Total		53	21

Scores and results list Japan's goal tally first, score column indicates score after each Nakayama goal.

List of international goals scored by Masashi Nakayama
No.	Date	Venue	Opponent	Score	Result	Competition
1	29 August 1992	Beijing, China	South Korea	1–1	2–2	1992 Dynasty Cup
2	1 November 1992	Hiroshima, Japan	North Korea	1–1	1–1	1992 AFC Asian Cup
3	6 November 1992	Hiroshima, Japan	China	3–2	3–2	1992 AFC Asian Cup
4	5 May 1993	Dubai, United Arab Emirates	Sri Lanka	6–0	6–0	1994 FIFA World Cup qualification
5	18 October 1993	Doha, Qatar	Iran	1–2	1–2	1994 FIFA World Cup qualification
6	21 October 1993	Doha, Qatar	North Korea	2–0	3–0	1994 FIFA World Cup qualification
7	28 October 1993	Doha, Qatar	Iraq	2–1	2–2	1994 FIFA World Cup qualification
8	28 May 1995	Tokyo, Japan	Ecuador	1–0	3–0	1995 Kirin Cup
9	8 November 1997	Tokyo, Japan	Kazakhstan	3–0	5–1	1998 FIFA World Cup qualification
10	16 November 1997	Johor Bahru, Malaysia	Iran	1–0	3–2	1998 FIFA World Cup qualification
11	1 March 1998	Yokohama, Japan	South Korea	1–0	2–1	1998 Dynasty Cup
12	1 April 1998	Seoul, South Korea	South Korea	1–1	1–2	Friendly
13	26 June 1998	Lyon, France	Jamaica	1–2	1–2	1998 FIFA World Cup
14	28 October 1998	Osaka, Japan	Egypt	1–0	1–0	Friendly
15	13 February 2000	Macau	Singapore	2–0	3–0	2000 AFC Asian Cup qualification
16	16 February 2000	Macau	Brunei	1–0	9–0	2000 AFC Asian Cup qualification
17	16 February 2000	Macau	Brunei	2–0	9–0	2000 AFC Asian Cup qualification
18	16 February 2000	Macau	Brunei	3–0	9–0	2000 AFC Asian Cup qualification
19	20 February 2000	Macau	Macau	1–0	3–0	2000 AFC Asian Cup qualification
20	20 February 2000	Macau	Macau	3–0	3–0	2000 AFC Asian Cup qualification
21	15 August 2001	Fukuroi, Japan	Australia	3–0	3–0	2001 AFC–OFC Challenge Cup

== Managerial statistics ==
Update; as of 16 April 2023

Team	From	To	Record				
Team	From	To	G	W	D	L	Win %
Azul Claro Numazu	13 November 2022	present	7	2	3	2	28.57
Total			7	2	3	2	28.57

== Honours ==
Júbilo Iwata

- AFC Champions League: 1998–99
- Asian Super Cup: 1999
- J1 League: 1997, 1999, 2002
- Emperor's Cup: 2003
- Japanese Super Cup: 2000, 2003, 2004

Japan

- AFC Asian Cup: 1992
- FIFA Confederations Cup Runner-up: 2001

Individual

- J.League Most Valuable Player: 1998
- J.League Top Scorer: 1998, 2000
- J.League Best XI: 1997, 1998, 2000, 2002
- J.League 20th Anniversary Team
- Japanese Footballer of the Year: 1998
- AFC Player of the Month: April 1998
- Selected to AFC All Star Team: 1999
