= Makoto Sunakawa =

Japanese footballer

Makoto Sunakawa 砂川 誠
Personal information
- Full name: Makoto Sunakawa
- Date of birth: August 10, 1977 (age 49)
- Place of birth: Narashino, Chiba, Japan
- Height: 1.73 m (5 ft 8 in)
- Position: Midfielder

Youth career
- 1993–1995: Funabashi High School

Senior career*
Years	Team	Apps	(Gls)
1996–2002	Kashiwa Reysol	70	(6)
2003–2015	Consadole Sapporo	415	(35)
2015	FC Gifu	10	(0)
Total		495	(41)
Medal record
Kashiwa Reysol
Winner	J.League Cup	1999
- * Club domestic league appearances and goals

Makoto Sunakawa (砂川 誠, Sunakawa Makoto; born August 10, 1977) is a former Japanese football player.

== Playing career ==
Sunakawa was born in Narashino on August 10, 1977. After graduating from high school, he joined his local club Kashiwa Reysol in 1996. On June 1, he debuted in J.League Cup against Urawa Reds. However he could only play this match until 1998. From 1999, he played many matches as offensive midfielder and the club won the champions 1999 J.League Cup. The club also won the 3rd place in 1999 and 2000 J1 League. However his opportunity to play decreased in 2002. In 2003, he moved to newly was relegated to J2 League club, Consadole Sapporo. He became a regular player as offensive midfielder and the club won the champions in 2007. In 2008, although the club played in J1 League, finished at bottom place and was relegated to J2 in a year. From 2009, he lost his regular position behind young player Seiya Fujita and Hiroki Miyazawa. However he played many matches and the club was promoted to J1 in 2012. He also became a first player who played for more than 10 years in club history. Although the club was relegated to J2 in a year, he played many matches until 2014. In 2015, he could not play at all in the match for injury. In July 2015, he moved to FC Gifu and he retired end of 2015 season.

== Club statistics ==
Club performance			League		Cup		League Cup		Total	
Season	Club	League	Apps	Goals	Apps	Goals	Apps	Goals	Apps	Goals
Japan			League		Emperor's Cup		J.League Cup		Total	
1996	Kashiwa Reysol	J1 League	0	0	0	0	1	0	1	0
1997	Kashiwa Reysol	J1 League	0	0	0	0	0	0	0	0
1998	Kashiwa Reysol	J1 League	0	0	0	0	0	0	0	0
1999	Kashiwa Reysol	J1 League	15	0	3	1	4	1	22	2
2000	Kashiwa Reysol	J1 League	20	5	2	0	1	0	23	5
2001	Kashiwa Reysol	J1 League	23	1	1	0	2	0	26	1
2002	Kashiwa Reysol	J1 League	12	0	1	0	3	0	16	0
2003	Consadole Sapporo	J2 League	34	6	3	2	-		37	8
2004	Consadole Sapporo	J2 League	34	2	4	0	-		38	2
2005	Consadole Sapporo	J2 League	37	4	1	0	-		38	4
2006	Consadole Sapporo	J2 League	43	7	4	2	-		47	9
2007	Consadole Sapporo	J2 League	42	2	1	0	-		43	2
2008	Consadole Sapporo	J1 League	32	1	1	0	6	1	39	2
2009	Consadole Sapporo	J2 League	46	3	2	0	-		48	3
2010	Consadole Sapporo	J2 League	27	1	2	1	-		29	2
2011	Consadole Sapporo	J2 League	38	2	0	0	-		38	2
2012	Consadole Sapporo	J1 League	17	0	1	0	2	0	20	0
2013	Consadole Sapporo	J2 League	36	3	3	1	-		39	4
2014	Consadole Sapporo	J2 League	29	4	1	0	-		30	4
2015	Consadole Sapporo	J2 League	0	0	0	0	-		0	0
2015	FC Gifu	J2 League	10	0	0	0	-		10	0
Career total			495	41	30	7	19	2	544	50
