= Junki Hata =

Japanese footballer

Junki Hata 畑 潤基
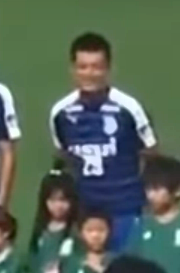
- Hata with Azul Claro Numazu in 2018 (low resolution image)

Personal information
- Full name: Junki Hata
- Date of birth: August 14, 1994 (age 32)
- Place of birth: Moriyama-ku, Nagoya, Aichi, Japan
- Height: 1.79 m (5 ft 10 1/2 in)
- Positions: Forward; midfielder

Team information
- Current team: Wyvern FC
- Number: 33

Youth career
- Omori JSC
- Omori FC
- –2009: Nagoya SS
- 2010–2012: Tokai Gakuen High School

College career
Years	Team	Apps	(Gls)
2013–2016	Tokai Gakuen University		

Senior career*
Years	Team	Apps	(Gls)
2016–2021	V-Varen Nagasaki	62	(8)
2017-2018	→ Azul Claro Numazu (loan)	25	(8)
2021	→ Tochigi SC (loan)	30	(3)
2022	FC Gifu	24	(3)
2023–2025	Blaublitz Akita	87	(4)
2026–	Wyvern FC		
- * Club domestic league appearances and goals as of 16:00, 20 November 2026 (UTC)

Junki Hata (畑 潤基, Hata Junki; born August 14, 1994) is a Japanese footballer who plays as a forward/midfielder for Wyvern FC.

== Career ==
Hata was born in Moriyama-ku, Nagoya, Aichi, and joined the system of Tokai Gakuen High School and College. He became the top goalscorer of Tokai College Football League with 31 goals in 18 games in 2016. He signed his first contract with V-Varen Nagasaki and made his first professional appearance on 18 September. He scored his first goal for Nagasaki in a 1-2 loss against Tokushima Vortis on 2 October.In his third season he was loaned to J3 club Azul Claro Numazu and bagged eight goals in 25 games in 2018. In 2019 Hata returned to Nagasaki and netted two goals during the regular season, one goal for the Emperor's Cup and three goals in YBC Levain Cup.In his fifth season Hata struck five goals in 29 games. However he was transferred to J2 team Tochigi SC and chalked up three goals in 2021. Hata signed with the third division club FC Gifu and hit three goals in 2022. In January 2023 he signed a contract with the second tier club Blaublitz Akita. He scored a headed goal in a 2-1 loss of the Ou Honsen derby on Matchweek 17.

== Club statistics ==
As of 20 November 2026.

Appearances and goals by club, season and competition
Club	Season	League			National cup (Note: Includes Emperor's Cup)		League cup (Note: Includes J.League Cup)		Other		Total	
Club	Season	Division	Apps	Goals	Apps	Goals	Apps	Goals	Apps	Goals	Apps	Goals
Tokai Gakuen University	2016	–			1	0	–		–		1	0
V-Varen Nagasaki	2016	J2 League	5	1	0	0	0	0	–		5	1
V-Varen Nagasaki	2017	J2 League	5	0	1	0	0	0	–		6	0
V-Varen Nagasaki	2019	J2 League	23	2	4	1	7	3	–		34	6
V-Varen Nagasaki	2020	J2 League	29	5	0	0	0	0	–		29	5
V-Varen Nagasaki	Total		62	8	5	1	7	3	0	0	74	12
Azul Claro Numazu (loan)	2017	J3 League	0	0	–		–		–		0	0
Azul Claro Numazu (loan)	2018	J3 League	25	8	–		–		–		25	8
Azul Claro Numazu (loan)	Total		25	8	0	0	0	0	0	0	25	8
Tochigi SC (loan)	2021	J2 League	30	3	1	0	–		–		31	3
FC Gifu	2022	J3 League	24	3	2	0	–		–		26	3
Blaublitz Akita	2023	J2 League	41	4	0	0	0	0	–		41	4
Blaublitz Akita	2024	J2 League	33	0	1	0	3	0	–		37	0
Blaublitz Akita	2025	J2 League	13	0	3	0	2	0	–		18	0
Blaublitz Akita	Total		87	4	4	0	5	0	0	0	96	4
Wyvern FC	2026	–			–		–		1 (Note: Appearance in All Japan Senior Football Championship)	1	1	1
Career total			228	26	13	1	12	3	1	1	254	31
