= 2011 Consadole Sapporo season =

Consadole Sapporo
2011 season
- Manager: Nobuhiro Ishizaki
- J.League Division 2: 3rd (Promoted to J1)
- Emperor's Cup: 2nd round
Home colours	Away colours

The 2011 Consadole Sapporo season was Consadole Sapporo's fourteenth season in the J. League system and 27th overall in the second tier. Consadole Sapporo won promotion to the 2012 J.League Division 1 and was knocked out of the Emperor's Cup in the second round.

== Competitions ==
=== J. League ===
==== Results summary ====
5 March 2011 Round 1	Ehime FC	2 - 0	Consadole Sapporo	Ningineer Stadium
Saturday 14:02	Josimar 16', Akai 56'	Report		Attendance: 6,230; Referee: Yoshida

6 July 2011 Round 2	Consadole Sapporo	0 - 0	Giravanz Kitakyushu	Sapporo Dome
Wednesday 17:03		Report		Attendance: 7,811; Referee: Noda

17 August 2011 Round 3	Consadole Sapporo	4 - 0	JEF United Chiba	Sapporo Dome
Wednesday 19:03	Takaki 3'; Uchimura 26', 53'; Furuta 87'	Report		Attendance: 11,765; Referee: Yoshida

3 September 2011 Round 4	Mito HollyHock	1 - 2	Consadole Sapporo	K's denki Stadium Mito
Saturday 18:04	Romero 45+1'	Report	6' Diogo; 51' Sunakawa	Attendance: 2,748; Referee: Okabe

21 September 2011 Round 5	Consadole Sapporo	4 - 2	Tokyo Verdy
Wednesday 19:03

19 October 2011 Round 6	Kyoto Sanga F.C.	4 - 0	Consadole Sapporo
Wednesday 19:04

26 October 2011 Round 7	Tokushima Vortis	0 - 2	Consadole Sapporo
Wednesday 19:04

23 April 2011 Round 8	Consadole Sapporo	0 - 1	Shonan Bellmare
Saturday 16:04

30 April 2011 Round 9	F.C. Tokyo	0 - 0	Consadole Sapporo
Saturday 13:04

4 May 2011 Round 10	Consadole Sapporo	1 - 0	Thespa Kusatsu
Wednesday 14:04

8 May 2011 Round 11	Roasso Kumamoto	1 - 0	Consadole Sapporo
Sunday 16:03

15 May 2011 Round 12	Consadole Sapporo	2 - 0	Gainare Tottori
Sunday 14:03

21 May 2011 Round 13	Sagan Tosu	1 - 0	Consadole Sapporo
Saturday 13:04

29 May 2011 Round 14	Consadole Sapporo	2 - 1	Fagiano Okayama
Sunday 13:04

4 June 2011 Round 15	Oita Trinita	0 - 1	Consadole Sapporo
Saturday 16:05

12 June 2011 Round 16	Consadole Sapporo	0 - 2	Yokohama F.C.
Sunday 13:03

19 June 2011 Round 17	F.C. Gifu	1 - 3	Consadole Sapporo
Sunday 18:04

26 June 2011 Round 18	Consadole Sapporo	0 - 0	Kataller Toyama
Sunday 14:03

2 July 2011 Round 19	Tochigi S.C.	1 - 1	Consadole Sapporo
Saturday 18:03

9 July 2011 Round 20	Consadole Sapporo	3 - 1	Ehime F.C.
Saturday 14:05

16 July 2011 Round 21	Consadole Sapporo	2 - 1	Mito HollyHock
Saturday 14:04

23 July 2011 Round 22	JEF United Chiba	2 - 0	Consadole Sapporo
Saturday 19:03

31 July 2011 Round 23	Consadole Sapporo	1 - 0	F.C. Gifu
Sunday 15:03

14 August 2011 Round 24	Kataller Toyama	1 - 2	Consadole Sapporo
Sunday 18:04

21 August 2011 Round 25	Consadole Sapporo	2 - 1	Kyoto Sanga F.C.
Sunday 13:03

26 August 2011 Round 26	Fagiano Okayama	1 - 0	Consadole Sapporo
Friday 19:33

11 September 2011 Round 27	Consadole Sapporo	1 - 0	Tochigi S.C.
Sunday 13:04

17 September 2011 Round 28	Giravanz Kitakyushu	0 - 3	Consadole Sapporo
Saturday 18:03

24 September 2011 Round 29	Consadole Sapporo	0 - 0	Tokushima Vortis
Saturday 13:03

2 October 2011 Round 30	Yokohama F.C.	1 - 2	Consadole Sapporo
Sunday 16:03

16 October 2011 Round 31	Consadole Sapporo	0 - 1	Sagan Tosu
Sunday 13:04

22 October 2011 Round 32	Gainare Tottori	1 - 0	Consadole Sapporo
Saturday 17:03

30 October 2011 Round 33	Consadole Sapporo	3 - 0	Roasso Kumamoto
Sunday 13:05

6 November 2011 Round 34	Tokyo Verdy	2 - 1	Consadole Sapporo
Sunday 16:03

12 November 2011 Round 35	Consadole Sapporo	2 - 0	Oita Trinita
Saturday 13:03

20 November 2011 Round 36	Thespa Kusatsu	2 - 1	Consadole Sapporo
Sunday 13:04

26 November 2011 Round 37	Shonan Bellmare	0 - 2	Consadole Sapporo
Saturday 14:03

3 December 2011 Round 38	Consadole Sapporo	2 - 1	F.C. Tokyo
Saturday 12:32

=== Results by round ===
Round	1	2	3	4	5	6	7	8	9	10	11	12	13	14	15	16	17	18	19	20	21	22	23	24	25	26	27	28	29	30	31	32	33	34	35	36	37	38
Ground	A	H	H	A	H	A	A	H	A	H	A	H	A	H	A	H	A	H	A	H	H	A	H	A	H	A	H	A	H	A	H	A	H	A	H	A	A	H
Result	L																																					
Position	18																																					

Updated to match(es) played on 6 March 2011. Source: "World-Football". 9 January 2024.
A = Away; H = Home; W = Win; D = Draw; L = Loss

=== League table ===
Pos	Team	Pld	W	D	L	GF	GA	GD	Pts	Promotion or relegation
1	FC Tokyo (C, P)	38	23	8	7	67	22	+45	77	Promotion to 2012 J.League Division 1 and Qualification to 2012 Champions League (Note: FC Tokyo, as winners of the 2011 Emperor's Cup, also qualified for the group stage of the 2012 AFC Champions League)
2	Sagan Tosu (P)	38	19	12	7	68	34	+34	69	Promotion to 2012 J.League Division 1
3	Consadole Sapporo (P)	38	21	5	12	49	32	+17	68	Promotion to 2012 J.League Division 1
4	Tokushima Vortis	38	19	8	11	51	38	+13	65	
5	Tokyo Verdy	38	16	11	11	69	45	+24	59	

Updated to match(es) played on December 3, 2011. Source: J.League Division 2
Rules for classification: 1st points; 2nd goal differential; 3rd goals scored; 4th head-to-head results; 5th disciplinary points; 6th draw. If two clubs are tied for first place, both clubs will be declared champions.
(C) Champions; (P) Promoted

=== Emperor's Cup ===
2011-10-08 Second Round	Consadole Sapporo	2 – 3 (a.e.t.)	Mito HollyHock	Sapporo Atsubetsu Park Stadium, Sapporo
13:00	Yokono 59'; Sakaki 85'	Report	Ozawa 58'; Romero Frank 88'; Koike 118'	Attendance: 3,523; Referee: Tomohiro Tsukada
