= Kazunari Okayama =

Zainichi Korean footballer (born 1978)

Kazunari Okayama 岡山 一成
Personal information
- Full name: Kazunari Okayama
- Date of birth: April 24, 1978 (age 48)
- Place of birth: Sakai, Osaka, Japan
- Height: 1.87 m (6 ft 2 in)
- Positions: Defender; forward

Youth career
- 1994–1996: Hatsushiba Hashimoto High School

Senior career*
Years	Team	Apps	(Gls)
1997–2000	Yokohama F. Marinos	30	(3)
1999	→Omiya Ardija (loan)	6	(1)
2001	Cerezo Osaka	28	(3)
2002–2004	Kawasaki Frontale	73	(3)
2005	Avispa Fukuoka	34	(0)
2006–2007	Kashiwa Reysol	46	(10)
2007–2008	Vegalta Sendai	51	(6)
2009–2010	Pohang Steelers	17	(1)
2011–2012	Consadole Sapporo	10	(0)
2013–2017	Nara Club	44	(1)
Total		339	(28)
Medal record
Yokohama F. Marinos
Runner-up	J1 League	2000
Cerezo Osaka
Runner-up	Emperor's Cup	2001
- * Club domestic league appearances and goals

Kazunari Okayama (岡山 一成, Okayama Kazunari; born April 24, 1978) or Kang Il-Sung (Korean: 강일성; Hanja: 康一成) is a former Japanese football player of Korean descent.

== Playing career ==
Okayama was born in Sakai on April 24, 1978. After graduating from high school, he joined J1 League club Yokohama Marinos (later Yokohama F. Marinos) in 1997. On September 6, he debuted as forward and scored a goal against Sanfrecce Hiroshima. After the debut, he scored a goal for 3 matches in a row. However he could hardly play in the match from 1998. In June 1999, he moved to J2 League club Omiya Ardija. In 2000, he returned to Yokohama F. Marinos. He was converted to center back and played many matches. In 2001, he moved to Cerezo Osaka. He played many matches as forward. In 2002, he moved to J2 club Kawasaki Frontale and became a regular player as right defender of three backs defense. Although he played many matches in 2003, he could not play as starting member in most matches and he could hardly play in the match in 2004. In 2005, he moved to Avispa Fukuoka. He played many matches as mainly center back and the club was promoted to J1 end of 2005 season. However he moved to J2 club Kashiwa Reysol in 2006. He played many matches as center back and the club was promoted to J1 from 2007 season. However he could hardly play in the match in 2007 and he moved to J2 club Vegalta Sendai in August 2007. He played as regular center back in 2 seasons. After a half year blank, he moved to South Korean club Pohang Steelers in July 2009. He played for the club in 2 seasons and returned to Japan end of 2010 season. After a half year blank, he joined to Consadole Sapporo in June 2011. However he could hardly play in the match and left the club end of 2012 season. In August 2013, he joined Regional Leagues club Nara Club. The club was promoted to Japan Football League from 2015. He retired at the end of the 2017 season.

== Career statistics ==
Appearances and goals by club, season and competition
Club	Season	League			Emperor's Cup		J.League Cup		Total	
Club	Season	Division	Apps	Goals	Apps	Goals	Apps	Goals	Apps	Goals
Yokohama Marinos	1997	J1 League	8	3	2	1	0	0	10	4
Yokohama Marinos	1998	J1 League	5	0	0	0	4	2	9	2
Yokohama F. Marinos	1999	J1 League	4	0	0	0	0	0	4	0
Omiya Ardija	1999	J2 League	6	1	2	2	0	0	8	3
Yokohama F. Marinos	2000	J1 League	13	0	1	0	1	0	15	0
Cerezo Osaka	2001	J1 League	28	3	4	0	2	0	34	3
Kawasaki Frontale	2002	J2 League	37	1	5	1	-		42	2
Kawasaki Frontale	2003	J2 League	34	2	1	0	-		35	2
Kawasaki Frontale	2004	J2 League	2	0	0	0	-		2	0
Avispa Fukuoka	2005	J2 League	34	0	1	0	-		35	0
Kashiwa Reysol	2006	J2 League	45	10	0	0	-		45	10
Kashiwa Reysol	2007	J1 League	1	0	0	0	3	0	4	0
Vegalta Sendai	2007	J2 League	18	2	0	0	-		18	2
Vegalta Sendai	2008	J2 League	33	4	0	0	-		33	4
Consadole Sapporo	2011	J2 League	5	0	1	0	-		6	0
Consadole Sapporo	2012	J1 League	5	0	1	0	2	0	8	0
Nara Club	2013	Regional Leagues	3	0	2	1	-		5	1
Nara Club	2014	Regional Leagues	8	0	2	1	-		10	1
Nara Club	2015	Football League	15	0	0	0	-		15	0
Nara Club	2016	Football League	5	0	1	0	-		6	0
Nara Club	2017	Football League	13	1	1	0	-		14	1
Total			322	27	24	6	12	2	358	35

== Honours ==
=== Club ===
Pohang Steelers

- League Cup: 2009
- AFC Champions League: 2009
