= Hiroyuki Nishijima =

Japanese footballer (born 1982)

Hiroyuki Nishijima 西嶋 弘之
Personal information
- Full name: Hiroyuki Nishijima
- Date of birth: April 7, 1982 (age 44)
- Place of birth: Kawai, Nara, Japan
- Height: 1.80 m (5 ft 11 in)
- Position: Defender

Youth career
- 1998–2000: Nara Ikuei High School

Senior career*
Years	Team	Apps	(Gls)
2001–2003	Sanfrecce Hiroshima	0	(0)
2004	Vissel Kobe	0	(0)
2004–2010	Consadole Sapporo	203	(14)
2011–2012	Tokushima Vortis	63	(6)
2013–2014	Yokohama FC	20	(0)
2015–2017	Giravanz Kitakyushu	60	(2)
Total		346	(22)
- * Club domestic league appearances and goals

Hiroyuki Nishijima (西嶋 弘之, Nishijima Hiroyuki; born April 7, 1982) is a former Japanese football player.

== Playing career ==
Nishijima was born in Kawai, Nara on April 7, 1982. After graduating from high school, he joined J1 League club Sanfrecce Hiroshima in 2001. However he could not play at all in the match until 2003. Although he moved to Vissel Kobe in 2004, he could not play at all in the match. In September 2004, he moved to J2 League club Consadole Sapporo. He became a regular player as left defender of three backs defense and played all matches until end of the season. Although his opportunity to play decreased for injuries from 2005, he became a regular player again from summer 2006. Consadole won the champions in 2007 season and was promoted to J1. Although Consadole was relegated to J2 in a year, he played many matches as mainly side back until 2010. In 2011, he moved to Tokushima Vortis. He played as regular side back in 2 seasons. In 2013, he moved to Yokohama FC. Although he played in 2 seasons, he could not play many matches. In 2015, he moved to Giravanz Kitakyushu. He played many matches in 2015 season. However his opportunity to play decreased from 2016 and Giravanz was also relegated to J3 League end of 2016 season. He retired end of 2017 season.

== Club statistics ==
Club performance			League		Cup		League Cup		Total	
Season	Club	League	Apps	Goals	Apps	Goals	Apps	Goals	Apps	Goals
Japan			League		Emperor's Cup		J.League Cup		Total	
2001	Sanfrecce Hiroshima	J1 League	0	0	0	0	0	0	0	0
2002	Sanfrecce Hiroshima	J1 League	0	0	0	0	0	0	0	0
2003	Sanfrecce Hiroshima	J2 League	0	0	0	0	-		0	0
Total			0	0	0	0	0	0	0	0
2004	Vissel Kobe	J1 League	0	0	0	0	0	0	0	0
Total			0	0	0	0	0	0	0	0
2004	Consadole Sapporo	J2 League	10	0	4	0	-		14	0
2005	Consadole Sapporo	J2 League	23	0	0	0	-		23	0
2006	Consadole Sapporo	J2 League	25	1	4	0	-		29	1
2007	Consadole Sapporo	J2 League	44	1	0	0	-		44	1
2008	Consadole Sapporo	J1 League	21	2	1	0	2	1	24	3
2009	Consadole Sapporo	J2 League	47	5	2	1	-		49	6
2010	Consadole Sapporo	J2 League	33	5	2	0	-		35	5
Total			203	14	13	1	2	1	218	16
2011	Tokushima Vortis	J2 League	35	4	1	0	-		36	4
2012	Tokushima Vortis	J2 League	28	2	1	0	-		29	2
Total			63	6	2	0	-		65	6
2013	Yokohama FC	J2 League	10	0	0	0	-		10	0
2014	Yokohama FC	J2 League	10	0	0	0	-		10	0
Total			20	0	0	0	-		20	0
2015	Giravanz Kitakyushu	J2 League	36	0	1	0	-		37	0
2016	Giravanz Kitakyushu	J2 League	14	1	2	0	-		16	1
2017	Giravanz Kitakyushu	J3 League	10	1	2	1	-		12	2
Total			60	2	5	1	-		65	3
Career total			346	22	20	2	2	1	368	25
