= Sapporo Minami High School =

Secondary school in Hokkaido, Japan

Coordinates: 43°2′12″N 141°21′11″E

- Japanese: 北海道札幌南高等学校
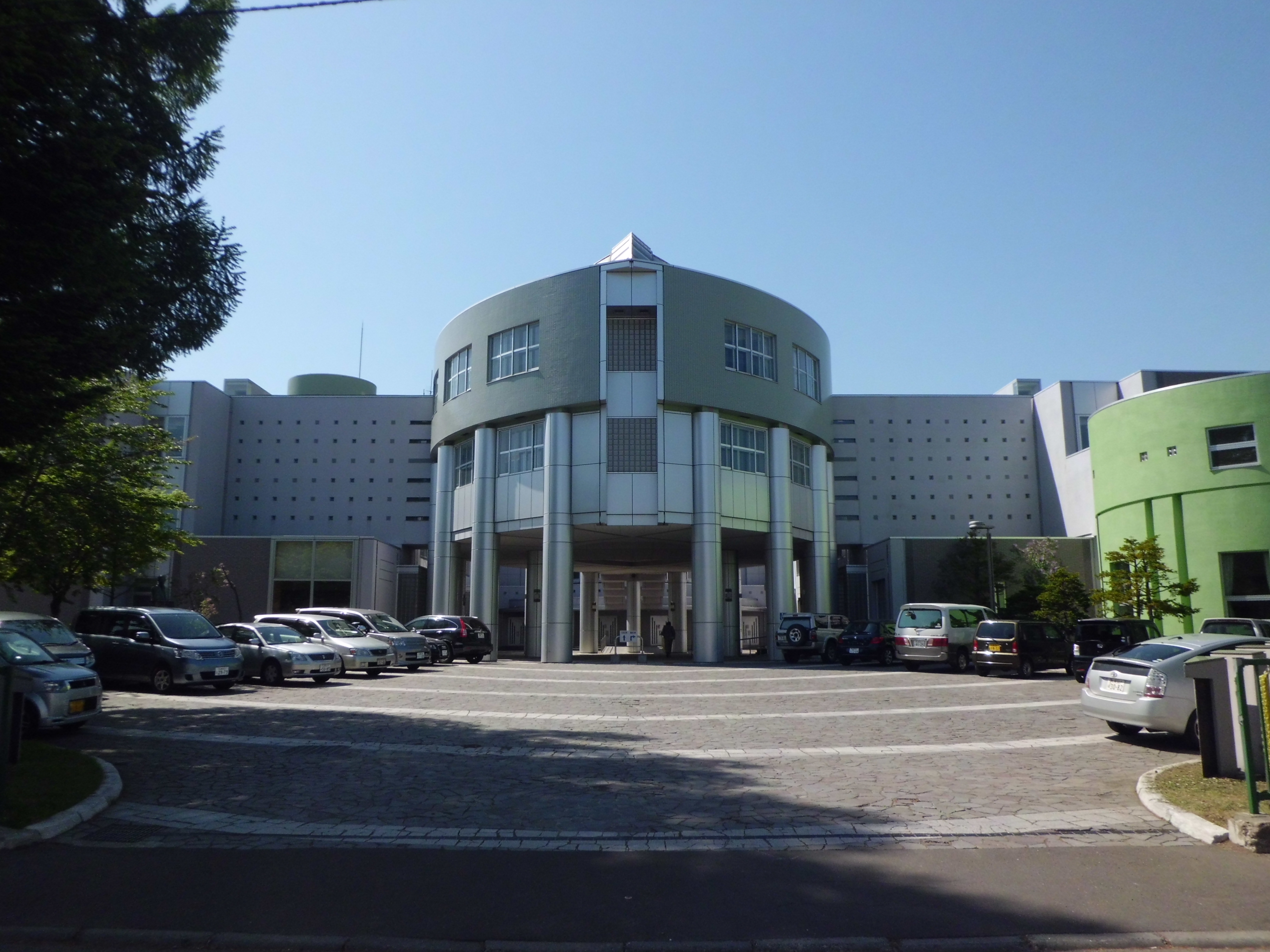

Information
- Established: 1895; 131 years ago
- Enrollment: c.1100

Hokkaido Sapporo Minami High School (北海道札幌南高等学校, Hokkaidō Sapporo Minami Kōtō Gakkō) is a high school in Chuo-ku, Sapporo, Hokkaidō, Japan, founded in 1895. It is the top high school in Hokkaido. There are approximately 1,100 students that attend the school.

The school is operated by the Hokkaido Prefectural Board of Education. In 1995, the school replaced its old school building with a new facility.

== Notable alumni ==
- Misao Fujimura (1st Year (10th Grade) Only)
- Satoru Iwata
- Tadamasa Kodaira
- Yasuharu Konishi
- Yushi Soda
- Tamiaki Yoneya
- Genzō Wakayama
- Junichi Watanabe

== Nearby places ==
- Toyohira River
- Sapporo Ring Road
