= Genki Nakayama =

Japanese footballer

Genki Nakayama 中山 元気
Personal information
- Full name: Genki Nakayama
- Date of birth: September 15, 1981 (age 45)
- Place of birth: Shimonoseki, Japan
- Height: 1.86 m (6 ft 1 in)
- Position: Forward

Youth career
- 1997–1999: Tatara Gakuen High School

Senior career*
Years	Team	Apps	(Gls)
2000–2004	Sanfrecce Hiroshima	34	(2)
2005–2009	Consadole Sapporo	155	(16)
2010	Shonan Bellmare	3	(1)
2011–2012	Renofa Yamaguchi		
Total		192	(19)

Managerial career
- 2013: Renofa Yamaguchi
- 2025: Renofa Yamaguchi
- * Club domestic league appearances and goals

Genki Nakayama (中山 元気, Nakayama Genki; born September 15, 1981) is a former Japanese football player.

== Playing career ==
Nakayama was born in Shimonoseki on September 15, 1981. After graduating from high school, he joined J1 League club Sanfrecce Hiroshima in 2000. However, he could hardly play in the match until 2002 and the club was relegated to J2 League from 2003. In summer 2003, he became a regular player and the club was promoted to J1 from 2004. However, he could not play many matches in 2004. In 2005, he moved to J2 club Consadole Sapporo. He became a regular player in 2006. Although his opportunity to play decreased in 2006, he became a regular player again in 2007 and the club won the champions and was promoted to J1 from 2008. Although he played many matches as regular player in 2008, the club was relegated to J2 in a year. In 2009, his opportunity to play decreased and played many matches as substitute forward. In 2010, he moved to newly was promoted to J1 club, Shonan Bellmare. However, he could hardly play in the match for injury in May. In 2011, he moved to Regional Leagues club Renofa Yamaguchi based in his home prefecture. He retired end of 2012 season.

== Career statistics ==
Appearances and goals by club, season and competition
Club	Season	League			Emperor's Cup		J.League Cup		Total	
Club	Season	Division	Apps	Goals	Apps	Goals	Apps	Goals	Apps	Goals
Sanfrecce Hiroshima	2000	J1 League	0	0	0	0	0	0	0	0
Sanfrecce Hiroshima	2001	J1 League	0	0	0	0	1	0	1	0
Sanfrecce Hiroshima	2002	J1 League	6	0	0	0	3	0	9	0
Sanfrecce Hiroshima	2003	J2 League	17	2	3	0	—		20	2
Sanfrecce Hiroshima	2004	J1 League	11	0	1	0	2	0	14	0
Consadole Sapporo	2005	J2 League	39	4	0	0	—		39	4
Consadole Sapporo	2006	J2 League	23	4	3	0	—		26	4
Consadole Sapporo	2007	J2 League	45	6	0	0	—		45	6
Consadole Sapporo	2008	J1 League	22	1	1	0	1	0	24	1
Consadole Sapporo	2009	J2 League	26	1	2	0	—		28	1
Shonan Bellmare	2010	J1 League	3	1	0	0	3	0	6	1
Career total			192	19	10	0	10	0	212	19
