= Yushi Soda =

Japanese footballer

Yushi Soda 曽田 雄志
Personal information
- Full name: Yushi Soda
- Date of birth: July 5, 1978 (age 48)
- Place of birth: Sapporo, Japan
- Height: 1.81 m (5 ft 11 1/2 in)
- Position: Defender

Youth career
- 1994–1996: Sapporo Minami High School
- 1997–2000: University of Tsukuba

Senior career*
Years	Team	Apps	(Gls)
2001–2009	Consadole Sapporo	232	(20)
Total		232	(20)
- * Club domestic league appearances and goals

Yushi Soda (曽田 雄志, Soda Yushi; born July 5, 1978) is a former Japanese football player.

== Playing career ==
Soda was born in Sapporo on July 5, 1978. After graduating from University of Tsukuba, he joined J1 League club Consadole Sapporo in 2001. He played many matches as forward from first season. In 2002, he also played as center back not only forward. However the club was relegated to J2 League from 2003. He was completely converted to center back in 2003 and became a regular player. He played many matches as center back for a long time and the club won the champions in 2007 and was promoted to J1 from 2008. However he could hardly play in the match in 2008 and the club was relegated to J2 in a year. On November 17, 2009, he announced his retirement. On November 29, he played as substitute forward from the 87th minute and scored a goal in 89th minute against Yokohama FC. This match is the only his match in 2009 season and his last match in his career.

== Career statistics ==
Appearances and goals by club, season and competition
Club	Season	League			Emperor's Cup		J.League Cup		Total	
Club	Season	Division	Apps	Goals	Apps	Goals	Apps	Goals	Apps	Goals
Consadole Sapporo	2001	J1 League	9	0	1	0	0	0	10	0
Consadole Sapporo	2002	J1 League	23	4	1	0	6	0	30	4
Consadole Sapporo	2003	J2 League	38	4	3	1	—		41	5
Consadole Sapporo	2004	J2 League	38	2	4	0	—		42	2
Consadole Sapporo	2005	J2 League	40	1	1	0	—		41	1
Consadole Sapporo	2006	J2 League	35	1	5	0	—		40	1
Consadole Sapporo	2007	J2 League	45	7	0	0	—		45	7
Consadole Sapporo	2008	J1 League	3	0	0	0	1	0	4	0
Consadole Sapporo	2009	J2 League	1	1	0	0	—		1	1
Career total			232	20	15	1	7	0	254	21
