= Yoshinobu Minowa =

Japanese footballer (born 1976)

Yoshinobu Minowa 箕輪 義信
Personal information
- Full name: Yoshinobu Minowa
- Date of birth: June 2, 1976 (age 50)
- Place of birth: Kawasaki, Kanagawa, Japan
- Height: 1.87 m (6 ft 1 1/2 in)
- Position: Defender

Youth career
- 1992–1994: Yaei Nishi High School
- 1995–1998: Sendai University

Senior career*
Years	Team	Apps	(Gls)
1999–2000	Júbilo Iwata	0	(0)
2000–2008	Kawasaki Frontale	244	(17)
2008–2010	Consadole Sapporo	12	(0)
Total		256	(17)

International career
2005	Japan	1	(0)
Medal record
Júbilo Iwata
Winner	J1 League	1999
Kawasaki Frontale
Runner-up	J1 League	2006
Runner-up	J1 League	2008
Runner-up	J.League Cup	2000
Runner-up	J.League Cup	2007
- * Club domestic league appearances and goals

Yoshinobu Minowa (箕輪 義信, Minowa Yoshinobu; born June 2, 1976) is a former Japanese football player. He played for Japan national team.

== Club career ==
Minowa was born in Kawasaki on June 2, 1976. After graduating from Sendai University, he joined Júbilo Iwata in 1999. However he did not play in the match, he moved to his local club Kawasaki Frontale in September 2000. The club was relegated to J2 League end of 2000 season. From 2001, although the club in J2 League, he became a regular player as defender. The club won the champions in 2004 and was promoted to J1 League. The club won the 2nd place 2006 J1 League and 2007 J.League Cup. In 2008, he lost his opportunity to play for injury and moved to Consadole Sapporo in June. The club was relegated to J2 League end of 2008 season. From 2009, he could not play for injury and he left the club end of 2010 season. He announced his retirement in September 2011.

== National team career ==
On April 25, 2005, when Minowa was 29 aged, he debuted for Japan national team in a friendly match against Ukraine.

== Club statistics ==
Club performance			League		Cup		League Cup		Continental		Total	
Season	Club	League	Apps	Goals	Apps	Goals	Apps	Goals	Apps	Goals	Apps	Goals
Japan			League		Emperor's Cup		J.League Cup		Asia		Total	
1999	Júbilo Iwata	J1 League	0	0	0	0	0	0	0	0	0	0
2000	Júbilo Iwata	J1 League	0	0	0	0	0	0	0	0	0	0
2000	Kawasaki Frontale	J1 League	1	0	0	0	0	0	-		1	0
2001	Kawasaki Frontale	J2 League	36	5	1	0	1	0	-		38	5
2002	Kawasaki Frontale	J2 League	40	4	0	0	-		-		40	4
2003	Kawasaki Frontale	J2 League	41	1	4	1	-		-		45	2
2004	Kawasaki Frontale	J2 League	36	1	2	0	-		-		38	1
2005	Kawasaki Frontale	J1 League	30	2	3	0	6	0	-		39	2
2006	Kawasaki Frontale	J1 League	30	3	2	0	10	0	-		42	3
2007	Kawasaki Frontale	J1 League	30	1	4	0	5	0	7	0	46	1
2008	Kawasaki Frontale	J1 League	0	0	0	0	0	0	-		0	0
2008	Consadole Sapporo	J1 League	12	0	0	0	0	0	-		12	0
2009	Consadole Sapporo	J2 League	0	0	0	0	-		-		0	0
2010	Consadole Sapporo	J2 League	0	0	0	0	-		-		0	0
Career total			256	17	16	1	22	0	7	0	301	18

== National team statistics ==
Japan national team
Year	Apps	Goals
2005	1	0
Total	1	0
