= 2016 V-Varen Nagasaki season =

V-Varen Nagasaki
2016 season
- Manager: Takuya Takagi
- Stadium: Transcosmos Stadium Nagasaki
- J2 League: 15th

2016 V-Varen Nagasaki season.

== J2 League ==
=== League table ===
Pos	Team	Pld	W	D	L	GF	GA	GD	Pts
14	Montedio Yamagata	42	11	14	17	43	49	−6	47
15	V-Varen Nagasaki	42	10	17	15	39	51	−12	47
16	Roasso Kumamoto	42	12	10	20	38	53	−15	46

Updated to match(es) played on 20 November 2016. Source: 2016 MEIJI YASUDA J2 LEAGUE League table
Rules for classification: 1) Points; 2) Goal difference; 3) Goals scored

=== Match details ===
J2 League match details
Match	Date	Team	Score	Team	Venue	Attendance
1	2016.02.28	Zweigen Kanazawa	1-2	V-Varen Nagasaki	Ishikawa Athletics Stadium	4,020
2	2016.03.06	V-Varen Nagasaki	0-3	Shimizu S-Pulse	Nagasaki Stadium	6,286
3	2016.03.13	Kamatamare Sanuki	2-2	V-Varen Nagasaki	Pikara Stadium	2,452
4	2016.03.20	Kyoto Sanga FC	0-0	V-Varen Nagasaki	Kyoto Nishikyogoku Athletic Stadium	5,658
5	2016.03.26	V-Varen Nagasaki	0-2	Roasso Kumamoto	Nagasaki Stadium	4,146
6	2016.04.03	V-Varen Nagasaki	1-1	Matsumoto Yamaga FC	Nagasaki Stadium	3,702
7	2016.04.10	Tokyo Verdy	0-0	V-Varen Nagasaki	Komazawa Olympic Park Stadium	2,752
9	2016.04.23	FC Machida Zelvia	1-0	V-Varen Nagasaki	Machida Stadium	4,431
10	2016.04.29	V-Varen Nagasaki	1-3	Yokohama FC	Nagasaki Stadium	5,254
11	2016.05.03	Giravanz Kitakyushu	2-2	V-Varen Nagasaki	Honjo Stadium	3,219
12	2016.05.07	V-Varen Nagasaki	0-3	Fagiano Okayama	Nagasaki Stadium	3,564
13	2016.05.15	V-Varen Nagasaki	1-1	Montedio Yamagata	Nagasaki Stadium	4,057
14	2016.05.22	Renofa Yamaguchi FC	0-3	V-Varen Nagasaki	Ishin Memorial Park Stadium	6,609
15	2016.05.28	V-Varen Nagasaki	1-1	JEF United Chiba	Nagasaki Stadium	4,826
16	2016.06.04	FC Gifu	2-4	V-Varen Nagasaki	Gifu Nagaragawa Stadium	4,074
17	2016.06.08	V-Varen Nagasaki	1-2	Cerezo Osaka	Nagasaki Stadium	5,388
18	2016.06.13	Hokkaido Consadole Sapporo	2-1	V-Varen Nagasaki	Sapporo Dome	10,607
19	2016.06.19	V-Varen Nagasaki	2-2	Thespakusatsu Gunma	Nagasaki Stadium	3,703
20	2016.06.26	Ehime FC	0-1	V-Varen Nagasaki	Ningineer Stadium	2,670
21	2016.07.03	Tokushima Vortis	0-0	V-Varen Nagasaki	Pocarisweat Stadium	3,243
22	2016.07.10	V-Varen Nagasaki	2-1	FC Gifu	Nagasaki Stadium	7,901
23	2016.07.16	V-Varen Nagasaki	2-1	Tokyo Verdy	Nagasaki Stadium	4,146
24	2016.07.20	Mito HollyHock	0-2	V-Varen Nagasaki	K's denki Stadium Mito	3,815
25	2016.07.24	Matsumoto Yamaga FC	1-0	V-Varen Nagasaki	Matsumotodaira Park Stadium	12,547
26	2016.07.31	V-Varen Nagasaki	1-0	FC Machida Zelvia	Nagasaki Stadium	4,433
27	2016.08.07	Roasso Kumamoto	1-2	V-Varen Nagasaki	Umakana-Yokana Stadium	6,572
28	2016.08.11	Shimizu S-Pulse	2-0	V-Varen Nagasaki	IAI Stadium Nihondaira	10,356
29	2016.08.14	V-Varen Nagasaki	0-0	Zweigen Kanazawa	Transcosmos Stadium Nagasaki	3,413
30	2016.08.21	V-Varen Nagasaki	1-1	Ehime FC	Transcosmos Stadium Nagasaki	4,850
8	2016.09.07	V-Varen Nagasaki	1-1	Mito HollyHock	Transcosmos Stadium Nagasaki	2,294
31	2016.09.11	Cerezo Osaka	2-0	V-Varen Nagasaki	Kincho Stadium	9,622
32	2016.09.18	V-Varen Nagasaki	0-0	Hokkaido Consadole Sapporo	Transcosmos Stadium Nagasaki	6,615
33	2016.09.25	Fagiano Okayama	0-0	V-Varen Nagasaki	City Light Stadium	8,165
34	2016.10.02	V-Varen Nagasaki	1-2	Tokushima Vortis	Transcosmos Stadium Nagasaki	3,687
35	2016.10.08	Yokohama FC	2-2	V-Varen Nagasaki	NHK Spring Mitsuzawa Football Stadium	2,465
36	2016.10.16	Thespakusatsu Gunma	3-0	V-Varen Nagasaki	Shoda Shoyu Stadium Gunma	2,980
37	2016.10.23	V-Varen Nagasaki	2-1	Renofa Yamaguchi FC	Transcosmos Stadium Nagasaki	4,536
38	2016.10.30	JEF United Chiba	0-0	V-Varen Nagasaki	Fukuda Denshi Arena	9,088
39	2016.11.03	V-Varen Nagasaki	0-0	Giravanz Kitakyushu	Transcosmos Stadium Nagasaki	6,089
40	2016.11.06	Montedio Yamagata	1-0	V-Varen Nagasaki	ND Soft Stadium Yamagata	5,206
41	2016.11.12	V-Varen Nagasaki	1-2	Kamatamare Sanuki	Transcosmos Stadium Nagasaki	3,194
42	2016.11.20	V-Varen Nagasaki	0-2	Kyoto Sanga FC	Transcosmos Stadium Nagasaki	5,041
