= 2014 Consadole Sapporo season =

Consadole Sapporo
2014 season
- Manager: Keiichi Zaizen; Ivica Barbarić
- Stadium: Sapporo Dome
- J2 League: 10th

2014 Consadole Sapporo season.

== J2 League ==
Match	Date	Team	Score	Team	Venue	Attendance
1	2014.03.02	Júbilo Iwata	0-1	Consadole Sapporo	Yamaha Stadium	11,730
2	2014.03.09	Consadole Sapporo	1-1	Montedio Yamagata	Sapporo Dome	16,064
3	2014.03.16	Shonan Bellmare	2-0	Consadole Sapporo	Shonan BMW Stadium Hiratsuka	8,269
4	2014.03.22	Consadole Sapporo	3-0	Giravanz Kitakyushu	Sapporo Dome	9,251
5	2014.03.30	Kyoto Sanga FC	1-1	Consadole Sapporo	Kyoto Nishikyogoku Athletic Stadium	4,703
6	2014.04.05	Consadole Sapporo	1-0	Matsumoto Yamaga FC	Sapporo Dome	9,723
7	2014.04.13	Oita Trinita	1-0	Consadole Sapporo	Oita Bank Dome	6,072
8	2014.04.20	Consadole Sapporo	1-0	Thespakusatsu Gunma	Sapporo Dome	8,536
9	2014.04.26	Fagiano Okayama	2-0	Consadole Sapporo	Kanko Stadium	6,381
10	2014.04.29	Consadole Sapporo	0-0	Tokyo Verdy	Sapporo Dome	10,163
11	2014.05.03	Tochigi SC	2-1	Consadole Sapporo	Tochigi Green Stadium	5,775
12	2014.05.06	Consadole Sapporo	2-2	Roasso Kumamoto	Sapporo Dome	12,302
13	2014.05.12	Consadole Sapporo	0-1	Ehime FC	Sapporo Dome	6,646
14	2014.05.18	JEF United Chiba	2-0	Consadole Sapporo	Fukuda Denshi Arena	9,480
15	2014.05.25	Consadole Sapporo	4-0	Mito HollyHock	Sapporo Dome	6,966
16	2014.05.31	Consadole Sapporo	1-1	Avispa Fukuoka	Sapporo Atsubetsu Stadium	8,851
17	2014.06.07	Kamatamare Sanuki	1-0	Consadole Sapporo	Kagawa Marugame Stadium	2,626
18	2014.06.14	Yokohama FC	2-2	Consadole Sapporo	NHK Spring Mitsuzawa Football Stadium	6,097
19	2014.06.21	Consadole Sapporo	2-1	Kataller Toyama	Sapporo Atsubetsu Stadium	6,844
20	2014.06.28	Consadole Sapporo	3-2	FC Gifu	Sapporo Atsubetsu Stadium	7,293
21	2014.07.05	V-Varen Nagasaki	0-1	Consadole Sapporo	Nagasaki Stadium	4,290
22	2014.07.20	Consadole Sapporo	1-1	Oita Trinita	Sapporo Dome	20,633
23	2014.07.26	Ehime FC	2-3	Consadole Sapporo	Ningineer Stadium	5,017
24	2014.07.30	Consadole Sapporo	0-1	Yokohama FC	Sapporo Dome	13,719
25	2014.08.03	Giravanz Kitakyushu	2-0	Consadole Sapporo	Honjo Stadium	2,493
26	2014.08.10	Consadole Sapporo	0-1	Kyoto Sanga FC	Sapporo Dome	12,212
27	2014.08.17	Montedio Yamagata	2-1	Consadole Sapporo	ND Soft Stadium Yamagata	6,402
28	2014.08.25	Consadole Sapporo	1-1	Tochigi SC	Sapporo Dome	8,797
29	2014.08.31	Roasso Kumamoto	0-2	Consadole Sapporo	Umakana-Yokana Stadium	5,625
30	2014.09.06	Consadole Sapporo	2-1	V-Varen Nagasaki	Sapporo Dome	9,123
31	2014.09.14	FC Gifu	1-1	Consadole Sapporo	Gifu Nagaragawa Stadium	10,580
32	2014.09.20	Thespakusatsu Gunma	3-0	Consadole Sapporo	Shoda Shoyu Stadium Gunma	5,597
33	2014.09.23	Consadole Sapporo	3-1	Fagiano Okayama	Sapporo Dome	12,804
34	2014.09.28	Matsumoto Yamaga FC	1-2	Consadole Sapporo	Matsumotodaira Park Stadium	13,825
35	2014.10.04	Mito HollyHock	0-0	Consadole Sapporo	K's denki Stadium Mito	5,297
36	2014.10.11	Consadole Sapporo	0-2	JEF United Chiba	Sapporo Atsubetsu Stadium	7,844
37	2014.10.19	Kataller Toyama	0-2	Consadole Sapporo	Toyama Stadium	4,108
38	2014.10.26	Consadole Sapporo	2-0	Shonan Bellmare	Sapporo Dome	11,896
39	2014.11.01	Tokyo Verdy	0-0	Consadole Sapporo	Ajinomoto Stadium	7,764
40	2014.11.09	Consadole Sapporo	1-1	Kamatamare Sanuki	Sapporo Dome	12,954
41	2014.11.15	Avispa Fukuoka	2-2	Consadole Sapporo	Level5 Stadium	3,444
42	2014.11.23	Consadole Sapporo	1-1	Júbilo Iwata	Sapporo Dome	19,634
