= 2015 Consadole Sapporo season =

Consadole Sapporo
2015 season
- Manager: Ivica Barbarić; Shuhei Yomoda
- Stadium: Sapporo Dome
- J2 League: 10th

2015 Consadole Sapporo season.

== J2 League ==
=== League table ===
Pos	Team	Pld	W	D	L	GF	GA	GD	Pts
9	JEF United Chiba	42	15	12	15	50	45	+5	57
10	Consadole Sapporo	42	14	15	13	47	43	+4	57
11	Fagiano Okayama	42	12	18	12	40	35	+5	54

Source: Meiji Yasuda J2 League Standing
Rules for classification: 1) Points; 2) Goal difference; 3) Goals scored

=== Match details ===
J2 League match details
Match	Date	Team	Score	Team	Venue	Attendance
1	2015.03.08	Tochigi SC	1-2	Consadole Sapporo	Tochigi Green Stadium	7,146
2	2015.03.15	Consadole Sapporo	0-1	V-Varen Nagasaki	Sapporo Dome	18,086
3	2015.03.21	Consadole Sapporo	2-1	Avispa Fukuoka	Sapporo Dome	10,889
4	2015.03.29	Omiya Ardija	1-1	Consadole Sapporo	NACK5 Stadium Omiya	10,491
5	2015.04.01	Consadole Sapporo	1-2	Kyoto Sanga FC	Sapporo Dome	8,193
6	2015.04.05	Consadole Sapporo	1-1	Tokyo Verdy	Sapporo Dome	9,485
7	2015.04.11	Kamatamare Sanuki	0-0	Consadole Sapporo	Kagawa Marugame Stadium	2,779
8	2015.04.19	Consadole Sapporo	1-0	Mito HollyHock	Sapporo Dome	9,138
9	2015.04.26	Fagiano Okayama	0-1	Consadole Sapporo	City Light Stadium	10,107
10	2015.04.29	Zweigen Kanazawa	1-1	Consadole Sapporo	Ishikawa Athletics Stadium	6,657
11	2015.05.03	Consadole Sapporo	3-0	Júbilo Iwata	Sapporo Dome	16,902
12	2015.05.06	Ehime FC	0-0	Consadole Sapporo	Ningineer Stadium	3,124
13	2015.05.09	Consadole Sapporo	2-3	Roasso Kumamoto	Sapporo Dome	10,405
14	2015.05.17	Thespakusatsu Gunma	0-2	Consadole Sapporo	Shoda Shoyu Stadium Gunma	4,701
15	2015.05.24	Tokushima Vortis	1-2	Consadole Sapporo	Pocarisweat Stadium	4,595
16	2015.06.01	Consadole Sapporo	1-1	Cerezo Osaka	Sapporo Dome	18,044
17	2015.06.06	JEF United Chiba	1-1	Consadole Sapporo	Fukuda Denshi Arena	14,481
18	2015.06.14	FC Gifu	0-1	Consadole Sapporo	Gifu Nagaragawa Stadium	7,065
19	2015.06.21	Consadole Sapporo	1-1	Giravanz Kitakyushu	Sapporo Dome	12,691
20	2015.06.29	Consadole Sapporo	1-1	Oita Trinita	Sapporo Dome	8,974
21	2015.07.04	Yokohama FC	0-0	Consadole Sapporo	NHK Spring Mitsuzawa Football Stadium	6,422
22	2015.07.08	Consadole Sapporo	2-3	Omiya Ardija	Sapporo Dome	9,140
23	2015.07.12	Cerezo Osaka	3-1	Consadole Sapporo	Kincho Stadium	9,602
24	2015.07.18	Consadole Sapporo	0-1	Kamatamare Sanuki	Sapporo Dome	8,120
25	2015.07.22	Giravanz Kitakyushu	1-1	Consadole Sapporo	Honjo Stadium	2,419
26	2015.07.26	Consadole Sapporo	0-1	Ehime FC	Sapporo Dome	17,767
27	2015.08.01	Kyoto Sanga FC	2-0	Consadole Sapporo	Kyoto Nishikyogoku Athletic Stadium	7,096
28	2015.08.08	V-Varen Nagasaki	0-0	Consadole Sapporo	Nagasaki Stadium	8,854
29	2015.08.15	Consadole Sapporo	0-0	Fagiano Okayama	Sapporo Dome	10,902
30	2015.08.23	Roasso Kumamoto	1-1	Consadole Sapporo	Umakana-Yokana Stadium	6,532
31	2015.09.12	Consadole Sapporo	2-0	Yokohama FC	Sapporo Dome	10,840
32	2015.09.20	Avispa Fukuoka	2-1	Consadole Sapporo	Level5 Stadium	13,873
33	2015.09.23	Consadole Sapporo	1-2	FC Gifu	Sapporo Atsubetsu Stadium	8,761
34	2015.09.27	Consadole Sapporo	0-0	Thespakusatsu Gunma	Sapporo Dome	11,570
35	2015.10.04	Tokyo Verdy	0-2	Consadole Sapporo	Ajinomoto Stadium	7,712
36	2015.10.10	Consadole Sapporo	2-1	Zweigen Kanazawa	Sapporo Atsubetsu Stadium	6,981
37	2015.10.18	Júbilo Iwata	3-0	Consadole Sapporo	Yamaha Stadium	11,179
38	2015.10.25	Oita Trinita	2-0	Consadole Sapporo	Oita Bank Dome	9,062
39	2015.11.01	Consadole Sapporo	3-2	JEF United Chiba	Sapporo Dome	9,611
40	2015.11.07	Consadole Sapporo	2-0	Tokushima Vortis	Sapporo Dome	14,428
41	2015.11.14	Mito HollyHock	2-1	Consadole Sapporo	K's denki Stadium Mito	6,555
42	2015.11.23	Consadole Sapporo	4-1	Tochigi SC	Sapporo Dome	20,234
