= 2017 Azul Claro Numazu season =

Azul Claro Numazu
2017 season
- Manager: Ken Yoshida
- Stadium: Ashitaka Park Stadium
- J3 League: 3rd

2017 Azul Claro Numazu season.

== J3 League ==
=== League table ===
Pos	Team	Pld	W	D	L	GF	GA	GD	Pts	Promotion
1	Blaublitz Akita (C)	32	18	7	7	53	31	+22	61	Ineligible for promotion to 2018 J2 League
2	Tochigi SC (P)	32	16	12	4	44	24	+20	60	Promotion to 2018 J2 League (Note: Only teams that hold a J2 license are eligible for promotion.)
3	Azul Claro Numazu	32	16	11	5	60	27	+33	59	
4	Kagoshima United	32	17	4	11	49	37	+12	55	
5	Nagano Parceiro	32	13	11	8	34	25	+9	50	
6	FC Ryukyu	32	13	11	8	44	36	+8	50	

Source: 2017 MEIJI YASUDA J3 LEAGUE League table
Rules for classification: 1) Points; 2) Goal difference; 3) Goals scored; 4th) head-to-head results; 5th) disciplinary points; 6th) draw
(C) Champions; (P) Promoted

=== Match details ===
J3 League match details
Match	Date	Team	Score	Team	Venue	Attendance
2	2017.03.18	Azul Claro Numazu	1-2	Fukushima United FC	Ashitaka Park Stadium	3,089
3	2017.03.25	Azul Claro Numazu	4-1	Fujieda MYFC	Ashitaka Park Stadium	2,947
4	2017.04.02	Kataller Toyama	0-3	Azul Claro Numazu	Toyama Stadium	3,008
5	2017.04.16	Tochigi SC	2-1	Azul Claro Numazu	Tochigi Green Stadium	3,591
6	2017.04.30	Azul Claro Numazu	2-0	Kagoshima United FC	Ashitaka Park Stadium	2,813
7	2017.05.07	SC Sagamihara	2-2	Azul Claro Numazu	Sagamihara Gion Stadium	6,015
8	2017.05.13	FC Ryukyu	2-2	Azul Claro Numazu	Okinawa Athletic Park Stadium	1,365
9	2017.05.21	Azul Claro Numazu	4-0	Gamba Osaka U-23	Ashitaka Park Stadium	3,056
10	2017.05.28	YSCC Yokohama	1-4	Azul Claro Numazu	NHK Spring Mitsuzawa Football Stadium	1,005
11	2017.06.04	Azul Claro Numazu	1-0	Giravanz Kitakyushu	Ashitaka Park Stadium	2,112
12	2017.06.10	Cerezo Osaka U-23	1-4	Azul Claro Numazu	Kincho Stadium	852
13	2017.06.18	Azul Claro Numazu	0-1	Blaublitz Akita	Ashitaka Park Stadium	2,491
14	2017.06.25	FC Tokyo U-23	1-6	Azul Claro Numazu	Yumenoshima Stadium	1,735
15	2017.07.02	Gainare Tottori	2-2	Azul Claro Numazu	Tottori Bank Bird Stadium	1,552
16	2017.07.09	Azul Claro Numazu	1-1	AC Nagano Parceiro	Ashitaka Park Stadium	2,612
17	2017.07.16	Azul Claro Numazu	1-0	Grulla Morioka	Ashitaka Park Stadium	2,338
18	2017.07.23	Blaublitz Akita	0-2	Azul Claro Numazu	Akigin Stadium	1,355
19	2017.08.20	Azul Claro Numazu	1-1	Gainare Tottori	Ashitaka Park Stadium	2,962
20	2017.08.27	Fukushima United FC	0-0	Azul Claro Numazu	Toho Stadium	3,897
21	2017.09.02	Azul Claro Numazu	5-0	FC Tokyo U-23	Ashitaka Park Stadium	3,848
22	2017.09.10	Gamba Osaka U-23	2-3	Azul Claro Numazu	Suita City Football Stadium	1,044
23	2017.09.17	Azul Claro Numazu	2-0	Kataller Toyama	Ashitaka Park Stadium	1,574
24	2017.09.24	Grulla Morioka	2-1	Azul Claro Numazu	Iwagin Stadium	1,017
25	2017.10.01	Azul Claro Numazu	1-1	YSCC Yokohama	Ashitaka Park Stadium	4,293
26	2017.10.08	Fujieda MYFC	2-2	Azul Claro Numazu	Fujieda Soccer Stadium	2,577
28	2017.10.21	Kagoshima United FC	1-2	Azul Claro Numazu	Kagoshima Kamoike Stadium	2,798
29	2017.10.29	Azul Claro Numazu	1-0	Cerezo Osaka U-23	Ashitaka Park Stadium	753
30	2017.11.05	Azul Claro Numazu	0-0	SC Sagamihara	Ashitaka Park Stadium	2,911
31	2017.11.12	AC Nagano Parceiro	1-0	Azul Claro Numazu	Minami Nagano Sports Park Stadium	3,605
32	2017.11.19	Azul Claro Numazu	1-0	FC Ryukyu	Ashitaka Park Stadium	2,014
33	2017.11.26	Giravanz Kitakyushu	0-0	Azul Claro Numazu	Mikuni World Stadium Kitakyushu	5,723
34	2017.12.03	Azul Claro Numazu	1-1	Tochigi SC	Ashitaka Park Stadium	8,649
