= 2018 Azul Claro Numazu season =

Azul Claro Numazu
2018 season
- Manager: Ken Yoshida
- Stadium: Ashitaka Park Stadium
- J3 League: 4th

2018 Azul Claro Numazu season.

== J3 League ==
Match	Date	Team	Score	Team	Venue	Attendance
1	2018.03.11	FC Tokyo U-23	0–3	Azul Claro Numazu	Yumenoshima Stadium	1,527
2	2018.03.17	Azul Claro Numazu	1–0	Grulla Morioka	Ashitaka Park Stadium	2,481
4	2018.03.25	Giravanz Kitakyushu	0–2	Azul Claro Numazu	Mikuni World Stadium Kitakyushu	3,417
5	2018.04.01	Azul Claro Numazu	2–0	Kataller Toyama	Ashitaka Park Stadium	1,806
6	2018.04.08	AC Nagano Parceiro	2–2	Azul Claro Numazu	Nagano U Stadium	3,003
7	2018.04.15	Blaublitz Akita	1–0	Azul Claro Numazu	Akigin Stadium	831
8	2018.04.28	Azul Claro Numazu	1–0	Gainare Tottori	Ashitaka Park Stadium	2,567
9	2018.05.03	Fujieda MYFC	0–1	Azul Claro Numazu	Fujieda Soccer Stadium	2,592
10	2018.05.06	Gamba Osaka U-23	3–0	Azul Claro Numazu	Expo '70 Commemorative Stadium	1,254
11	2018.05.20	Azul Claro Numazu	0–0	Fukushima United FC	Ashitaka Park Stadium	2,829
13	2018.06.10	Azul Claro Numazu	0–0	Kagoshima United FC	Ashitaka Park Stadium	1,526
14	2018.06.17	Azul Claro Numazu	2–0	Thespakusatsu Gunma	Ashitaka Park Stadium	2,927
15	2018.06.23	FC Ryukyu	1–0	Azul Claro Numazu	Okinawa Athletic Park Stadium	2,817
16	2018.07.01	Azul Claro Numazu	1–1	Cerezo Osaka U-23	Ashitaka Park Stadium	2,379
17	2018.07.07	Azul Claro Numazu	1–0	YSCC Yokohama	Ashitaka Park Stadium	1,271
18	2018.07.16	Fukushima United FC	1–1	Azul Claro Numazu	Aizu Athletic Park Stadium	1,395
19	2018.07.21	Azul Claro Numazu	2–0	FC Tokyo U-23	Ashitaka Park Stadium	1,673
20	2018.08.25	Gainare Tottori	2–2	Azul Claro Numazu	Tottori Bank Bird Stadium	3,644
21	2018.09.02	Azul Claro Numazu	1–0	Giravanz Kitakyushu	Ashitaka Park Stadium	5,687
22	2018.09.08	YSCC Yokohama	2–2	Azul Claro Numazu	NHK Spring Mitsuzawa Football Stadium	874
3	2018.09.12	SC Sagamihara	2–1	Azul Claro Numazu	Sagamihara Gion Stadium	1,602
23	2018.09.16	Grulla Morioka	0–3	Azul Claro Numazu	Iwagin Stadium	844
24	2018.09.22	Azul Claro Numazu	2–1	Fujieda MYFC	Ashitaka Park Stadium	2,502
25	2018.09.30	Azul Claro Numazu	1–4	FC Ryukyu	Ashitaka Park Stadium	1,568
27	2018.10.14	Thespakusatsu Gunma	2–2	Azul Claro Numazu	Shoda Shoyu Stadium Gunma	2,932
28	2018.10.21	Azul Claro Numazu	1–2	Gamba Osaka U-23	Ashitaka Park Stadium	4,041
29	2018.10.28	Cerezo Osaka U-23	0–0	Azul Claro Numazu	Kincho Stadium	966
30	2018.11.04	Azul Claro Numazu	2–3	AC Nagano Parceiro	Ashitaka Park Stadium	2,170
31	2018.11.11	Kataller Toyama	1–2	Azul Claro Numazu	Toyama Stadium	2,940
32	2018.11.18	Azul Claro Numazu	0–0	SC Sagamihara	Ashitaka Park Stadium	5,074
33	2018.11.25	Kagoshima United FC	1–0	Azul Claro Numazu	Shiranami Stadium	10,916
34	2018.12.02	Azul Claro Numazu	2–0	Blaublitz Akita	Ashitaka Park Stadium	5,215
