= 2013 Consadole Sapporo season =

Consadole Sapporo
2013 season
- Manager: Keiichi Zaizen
- Stadium: Sapporo Dome
- J2 League: 8th

2013 Consadole Sapporo season.

== J2 League ==
Match	Date	Team	Score	Team	Venue	Attendance
1	2013.03.03	JEF United Chiba	0-1	Consadole Sapporo	Fukuda Denshi Arena	13,583
2	2013.03.10	Consadole Sapporo	0-1	Tochigi SC	Sapporo Dome	13,248
3	2013.03.17	Vissel Kobe	1-0	Consadole Sapporo	Noevir Stadium Kobe	6,776
4	2013.03.20	Consadole Sapporo	1-2	Matsumoto Yamaga FC	Sapporo Dome	9,979
5	2013.03.24	Avispa Fukuoka	0-1	Consadole Sapporo	Level5 Stadium	5,188
6	2013.03.31	Consadole Sapporo	1-3	Gamba Osaka	Sapporo Dome	17,020
7	2013.04.07	Fagiano Okayama	3-2	Consadole Sapporo	Kanko Stadium	6,310
8	2013.04.14	Consadole Sapporo	2-1	Tokushima Vortis	Sapporo Dome	8,173
9	2013.04.17	Gainare Tottori	0-2	Consadole Sapporo	Tottori Bank Bird Stadium	1,711
10	2013.04.21	V-Varen Nagasaki	0-0	Consadole Sapporo	Nagasaki Stadium	3,709
11	2013.04.28	Consadole Sapporo	1-3	Roasso Kumamoto	Sapporo Atsubetsu Stadium	6,003
12	2013.05.03	Consadole Sapporo	0-1	Kyoto Sanga FC	Sapporo Dome	11,981
13	2013.05.06	Giravanz Kitakyushu	1-2	Consadole Sapporo	Honjo Stadium	3,100
14	2013.05.12	Montedio Yamagata	0-1	Consadole Sapporo	ND Soft Stadium Yamagata	6,460
15	2013.05.19	Consadole Sapporo	1-1	Tokyo Verdy	Sapporo Atsubetsu Stadium	7,171
16	2013.05.26	Consadole Sapporo	0-1	Mito HollyHock	Sapporo Atsubetsu Stadium	8,590
17	2013.06.01	Yokohama FC	0-2	Consadole Sapporo	NHK Spring Mitsuzawa Football Stadium	7,135
18	2013.06.08	Ehime FC	3-2	Consadole Sapporo	Ningineer Stadium	5,544
19	2013.06.15	Consadole Sapporo	1-0	Kataller Toyama	Sapporo Atsubetsu Stadium	4,837
20	2013.06.22	Consadole Sapporo	4-0	FC Gifu	Sapporo Atsubetsu Stadium	5,464
21	2013.06.29	Thespakusatsu Gunma	2-0	Consadole Sapporo	Shoda Shoyu Stadium Gunma	2,723
22	2013.07.03	Tokushima Vortis	1-0	Consadole Sapporo	Pocarisweat Stadium	1,875
23	2013.07.07	Consadole Sapporo	3-0	Avispa Fukuoka	Sapporo Atsubetsu Stadium	6,257
24	2013.07.14	Tokyo Verdy	2-1	Consadole Sapporo	Ajinomoto Stadium	5,753
25	2013.07.20	Matsumoto Yamaga FC	2-4	Consadole Sapporo	Matsumotodaira Park Stadium	11,019
26	2013.07.27	Consadole Sapporo	3-0	Gainare Tottori	Sapporo Dome	12,696
27	2013.08.04	Kataller Toyama	3-1	Consadole Sapporo	Toyama Stadium	4,071
28	2013.08.11	Consadole Sapporo	2-0	Yokohama FC	Sapporo Atsubetsu Stadium	8,756
29	2013.08.18	Gamba Osaka	3-0	Consadole Sapporo	Expo '70 Commemorative Stadium	12,449
30	2013.08.21	Consadole Sapporo	3-0	Ehime FC	Sapporo Atsubetsu Stadium	5,664
31	2013.08.25	Mito HollyHock	1-3	Consadole Sapporo	K's denki Stadium Mito	5,609
32	2013.09.01	Consadole Sapporo	2-2	Fagiano Okayama	Sapporo Atsubetsu Stadium	6,792
33	2013.09.15	Tochigi SC	4-3	Consadole Sapporo	Tochigi Green Stadium	4,340
34	2013.09.22	Consadole Sapporo	1-0	V-Varen Nagasaki	Sapporo Atsubetsu Stadium	7,618
35	2013.09.29	Roasso Kumamoto	2-1	Consadole Sapporo	Umakana-Yokana Stadium	6,051
36	2013.10.06	Consadole Sapporo	1-3	Thespakusatsu Gunma	Sapporo Atsubetsu Stadium	6,396
37	2013.10.20	Consadole Sapporo	3-1	Montedio Yamagata	Sapporo Dome	9,304
38	2013.10.27	Kyoto Sanga FC	2-0	Consadole Sapporo	Kyoto Nishikyogoku Athletic Stadium	8,590
39	2013.11.03	Consadole Sapporo	1-0	JEF United Chiba	Sapporo Dome	12,718
40	2013.11.10	Consadole Sapporo	1-0	Vissel Kobe	Sapporo Dome	18,088
41	2013.11.17	FC Gifu	0-3	Consadole Sapporo	Gifu Nagaragawa Stadium	7,015
42	2013.11.24	Consadole Sapporo	0-0	Giravanz Kitakyushu	Sapporo Dome	24,813
