= Tomoki Suzuki (footballer) =

Japanese football player

Tomoki Suzuki 鈴木 智樹
Personal information
- Full name: Tomoki Suzuki
- Date of birth: June 8, 1985 (age 41)
- Place of birth: Iwamizawa, Hokkaido, Japan
- Height: 1.72 m (5 ft 8 in)
- Position: Midfielder

Youth career
- 2001–2003: Consadole Sapporo

Senior career*
Years	Team	Apps	(Gls)
2004–2008	Consadole Sapporo	78	(2)
Total		78	(2)
- * Club domestic league appearances and goals

Tomoki Suzuki (鈴木 智樹, Suzuki Tomoki; born June 8, 1985) is a Japanese former professional footballer who played as a midfielder.

== Career statistics ==
Appearances and goals by club, season and competition
Club	Season	League			Emperor's Cup		J.League Cup		Total	
Club	Season	Division	Apps	Goals	Apps	Goals	Apps	Goals	Apps	Goals
Consadole Sapporo	2003	J2 League	0	0	3	1	–		3	1
Consadole Sapporo	2004	J2 League	27	0	0	0	–		27	0
Consadole Sapporo	2005	J2 League	20	0	1	0	–		21	0
Consadole Sapporo	2006	J2 League	31	2	1	0	–		32	2
Consadole Sapporo	2007	J2 League	0	0	0	0	–		0	0
Consadole Sapporo	2008	J1 League	0	0	0	0	0	0	0	0
Career total			78	2	5	1	0	0	83	3
