= Shota Sakaki =

Japanese footballer

Shota Sakaki 榊 翔太
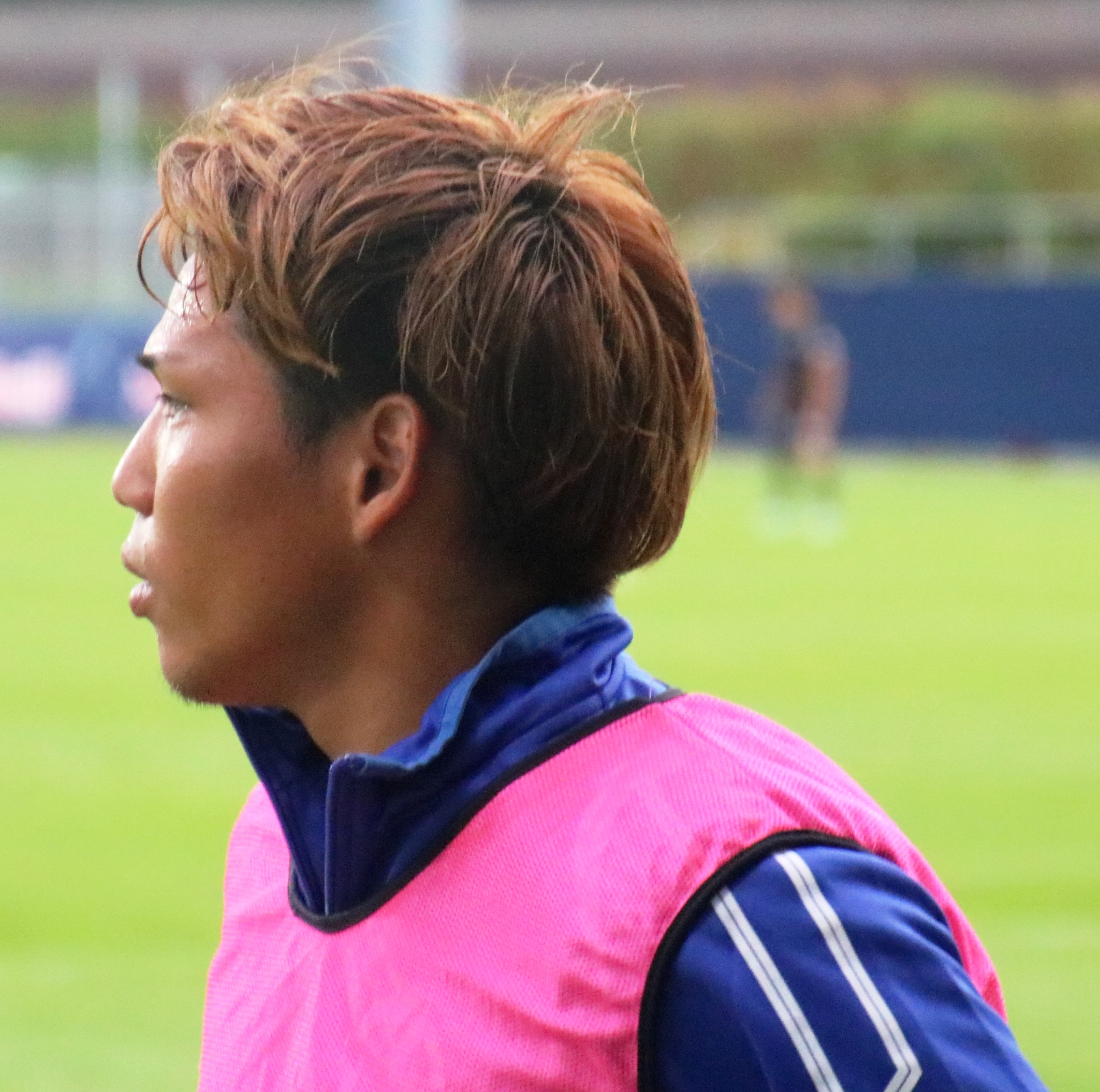
- Sakaki in 2016

Personal information
- Full name: Shota Sakaki
- Date of birth: August 3, 1993 (age 33)
- Place of birth: Shimizu, Hokkaido, Japan
- Height: 1.63 m (5 ft 4 in)
- Position: Forward

Team information
- Current team: AC Nagano Parceiro
- Number: 11

Youth career
- 2009–2011: Consadole Sapporo Youth

Senior career*
Years	Team	Apps	(Gls)
2011–2015	Consadole Sapporo	33	(2)
2015	→ J. League U-22 (loan)	1	(0)
2015–2017	SV Horn	40	(6)
2017–2020	Tochigi SC	15	(0)
- * Club domestic league appearances and goals as of 2 January 2019

Shota Sakaki (榊 翔太, Sakaki Shota; born August 3, 1993) is a Japanese football player who plays for AC Nagano Parceiro.

== Club statistics ==
Updated to 22 February 2018.

Club	Season	League		Cup^{1}		League Cup^{2}		Total	
Club	Season	Apps	Goals	Apps	Goals	Apps	Goals	Apps	Goals
Consadole Sapporo	2011	0	0	1	1	-		1	1
Consadole Sapporo	2012	12	2	0	0	5	3	17	5
Consadole Sapporo	2013	12	0	0	0	-		12	0
Consadole Sapporo	2014	9	0	0	0	-		9	0
Consadole Sapporo	2015	0	0	0	0	-		0	0
SV Horn	2015–16	23	5	1	1	-		24	6
SV Horn	2016–17	17	1	1	0	-		18	1
Tochigi SC	2017	2	0	0	0	-		2	0
Total		75	8	3	2	5	3	84	13

^{1}Includes Emperor's Cup.

^{2}Includes J.League Cup.
