= Yusuke Kondo =

Japanese footballer

Yusuke Kondo 近藤 祐介
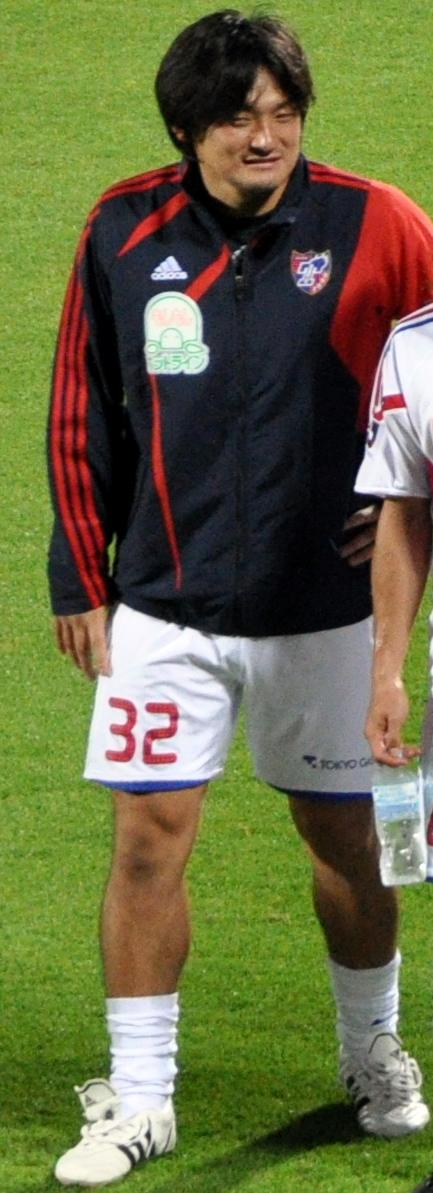

Personal information
- Full name: Yusuke Kondo
- Date of birth: December 5, 1984 (age 41)
- Place of birth: Edogawa, Tokyo, Japan
- Height: 1.80 m (5 ft 11 in)
- Position: Forward

Youth career
- 2000: Narashino High School
- 2001–2002: Ryutsu Keizai University Kashiwa High School

Senior career*
| Years | Team | Apps | (Gls) |
| 2003–2009 | FC Tokyo | 44 | (3) |
| 2006–2007 | → Vissel Kobe (loan) | 73 | (16) |
| 2010–2012 | Consadole Sapporo | 85 | (11) |
| 2013–2014 | Tochigi SC | 81 | (11) |
| 2015 | Giravanz Kitakyushu | 5 | (0) |
| 2015–2016 | AC Nagano Parceiro | 14 | (0) |
| 2016 | SC Sagamihara | 10 | (0) |
| Total | | 312 | (41) |
Medal record
FC Tokyo
| Winner | J.League Cup | 2004 |
| Winner | J.League Cup | 2009 |
- * Club domestic league appearances and goals

Yusuke Kondo (近藤 祐介, Kondo Yusuke; born December 5, 1984) is a former Japanese football player.

== Playing career ==
Kondo was born in Edogawa, Tokyo on December 5, 1984. After graduating from high school, he joined the J1 League club FC Tokyo in 2003. He got opportunities to play during his first season and FC Tokyo won the championship in the 2004 J.League Cup, the first major title in the club's history. In 2006, he was loaned to the newly demoted J2 League club, Vissel Kobe. He became a regular forward and Vissel was returned to J1 at the end of the 2006 season. He also played as a regular forward in 2007. In 2008, he returned to FC Tokyo. However he did not play much, due to an injury in 2008. Although he could not play as often as Sota Hirayama in 2009, FC Tokyo won the championship in the 2009 J.League Cup. In 2010, he moved to the J2 club Consadole Sapporo. He was converted to left midfielder in 2011 and played as a regular player in all 38 matches during the 2011 season. Consadole also won third place in the 2011 season and was promoted to J1. Although he played in many matches as right midfielder in 2012, Consadole finished in last place in by the end of the 2012 season. In 2013, he moved to the J2 club Tochigi SC. He played in many matches as a regular left midfielder during two seasons. In 2015, he moved to the J2 club Giravanz Kitakyushu. However he did not play much. In July 2015, he moved to the J3 League club AC Nagano Parceiro. In July 2016, he moved to the J3 club SC Sagamihara. He retired at the end of the 2016 season.

== Club statistics ==
| Club performance | | | League | | Cup | | League Cup | | Total | |
| Season | Club | League | Apps | Goals | Apps | Goals | Apps | Goals | Apps | Goals |
| Japan | | | League | | Emperor's Cup | | J.League Cup | | Total | |
|---|---|---|---|---|---|---|---|---|---|---|
| 2003 | FC Tokyo | J1 League | 6 | 1 | 2 | 1 | 0 | 0 | 8 | 2 |
| 2004 | FC Tokyo | J1 League | 9 | 0 | 1 | 0 | 2 | 0 | 12 | 0 |
| 2005 | FC Tokyo | J1 League | 11 | 1 | 1 | 0 | 4 | 1 | 16 | 2 |
| Total | | | 26 | 2 | 4 | 1 | 6 | 1 | 36 | 4 |
| 2006 | Vissel Kobe | J2 League | 42 | 10 | 0 | 0 | - | | 42 | 10 |
| 2007 | Vissel Kobe | J1 League | 31 | 6 | 2 | 0 | 6 | 1 | 39 | 7 |
| Total | | | 73 | 16 | 2 | 0 | 6 | 1 | 81 | 17 |
| 2008 | FC Tokyo | J1 League | 6 | 0 | 2 | 0 | 2 | 1 | 10 | 1 |
| 2009 | FC Tokyo | J1 League | 12 | 1 | 2 | 0 | 4 | 1 | 18 | 2 |
| Total | | | 18 | 1 | 4 | 0 | 6 | 2 | 28 | 3 |
| 2010 | Consadole Sapporo | J2 League | 26 | 3 | 1 | 0 | - | | 27 | 3 |
| 2011 | Consadole Sapporo | J2 League | 38 | 7 | 1 | 1 | – | | 39 | 8 |
| 2012 | Consadole Sapporo | J1 League | 21 | 1 | 0 | 0 | 6 | 0 | 27 | 1 |
| Total | | | 85 | 11 | 2 | 1 | 6 | 0 | 93 | 12 |
| 2013 | Tochigi SC | J2 League | 41 | 7 | 2 | 1 | – | | 43 | 8 |
| 2014 | Tochigi SC | J2 League | 40 | 4 | 0 | 0 | – | | 40 | 4 |
| Total | | | 81 | 11 | 2 | 1 | – | | 83 | 12 |
| 2015 | Giravanz Kitakyushu | J2 League | 5 | 0 | 0 | 0 | – | | 5 | 0 |
| Total | | | 5 | 0 | 0 | 0 | – | | 5 | 0 |
| 2015 | AC Nagano Parceiro | J3 League | 8 | 0 | 2 | 0 | – | | 10 | 0 |
| 2016 | AC Nagano Parceiro | J3 League | 6 | 0 | 0 | 0 | – | | 6 | 0 |
| Total | | | 14 | 0 | 2 | 0 | – | | 16 | 0 |
| 2016 | SC Sagamihara | J3 League | 10 | 0 | – | | – | | 10 | 0 |
| Total | | | 10 | 0 | – | | – | | 10 | 0 |
| Career total | | | 312 | 41 | 16 | 3 | 24 | 4 | 352 | 48 |
