= Ashitaka Park Stadium =

Sports stadium

- Interactive map of Ashitaka Park Stadium
- Location: Numazu, Shizuoka, Japan
- Coordinates: 35°09′10″N 138°50′52″E
- Owner: Shizuoka Prefecture
- Operator: Nissan Creative Services
- Capacity: 10,000

Construction
- Opened: 1996

Tenant
- Azul Claro Numazu

Ashitaka Park Stadium (愛鷹広域公園多目的競技場, Ashitaka Kōiki-kōen Tamokuteki Kyōgijō) is a multi-purpose athletic stadium in Numazu, Shizuoka, Japan. It is located in the Ashitaka Regional Park in Numazu City, Shizuoka Prefecture. It is also used as a ball game field. The facility is owned by Shizuoka Prefecture and operated and managed by Nissan Creative Services as a designated administrator.

== History ==
Opened in 1996. This is the second prefectural athletic field in Shizuoka Prefecture after the Kusanagi Athletic Stadium in Shizuoka Prefecture. Currently, there are three prefectural athletic stadiums in conjunction with Ogasayama Sports Park Stadium (Ecopa Stadium) in Shizuoka Prefecture, which was completed in 2001.

It was the first full-scale athletic field in the eastern part of the prefecture. Prior to its establishment, sports events in area were held either at the Koryo Ground, which had no seating, or at the Fuji Sports Park Athletic Stadium in Fuji City.

It was the home stadium of the now defunct JATCO Soccer Club and is now home to football club Azul Claro Numazu.

== Facility overview ==
- Japanese Association of Athletics Federations Class 2
- Athletics Track: 400m x 8 lanes, all-weather paving
- Field Measurements: 107 x 70m
- Surface: Natural grass
- Lighting: Main stand lights, 2 lighting towers (maximum illuminance 500Lx)
- Capacity1: 10,000 (main stand 5,000 people backstand (lawn) 5,000 people)

In the J. League, as a rule, lawn seats do not count to the capacity of a stadium, so the number of seats that can be listed as capacity is set to 5,056, which is only in the main stand. The lawn seats are behind the goal. As seen from the main stand, the left side is for the Azul Claro side and the right side is for the away supporters. Since the Ashitaka Park Stadium does not meet the J2 and J1 requirements, the clubs vision is to obtain a J1 license by 2024 and to be promoted to J1 by 2027. In order to expand and renovate the stadium, Ryuji Watanabe, President and CEO of Azul Claro Suruga Corporation, submitted a request to The Mayor of Numazu, Akiho Onuma and the "Shizuoka Eastern Regional Football Stadium Initiative Liaison Committee" was held in 2018 to discuss future development.

== Directions ==
- From JR Numazu Station Kitaguchi Bus Terminal 2, take Fujikyu City Bus to the "Ashita Sports Park" line to get off at the end (Saturdays and holidays only)
- 12 minutes by car from JR Numazu Station
