= Shinya Uehara =

Japanese footballer

Shinya Uehara 上原 慎也
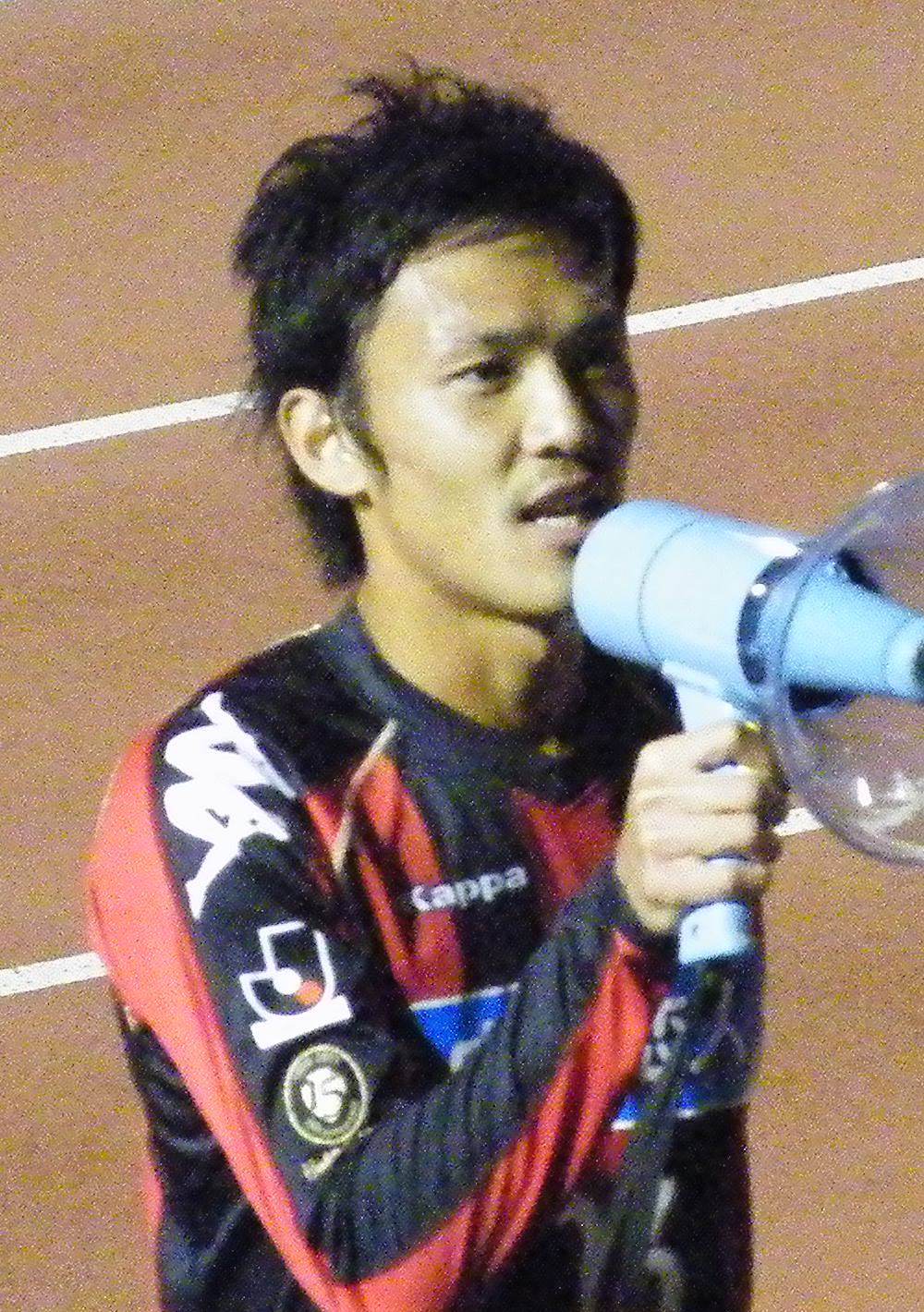

Personal information
- Full name: Shinya Uehara
- Date of birth: September 29, 1986 (age 40)
- Place of birth: Nishihara, Okinawa, Japan
- Height: 1.86 m (6 ft 1 in)
- Position: Striker

Team information
- Current team: Seriole Okinawa
- Number: 21

Youth career
- 2005–2008: Okinawa University

Senior career*
Years	Team	Apps	(Gls)
2009–2017	Hokkaido Consadole Sapporo	176	(19)
2018	Ehime FC	12	(0)
2019–2022	FC Ryukyu	109	(15)
2023–	Seriole Okinawa		
- * Club domestic league appearances and goals as of 18 September 2022

Shinya Uehara (上原 慎也, Uehara Shin'ya; born September 29, 1986) is a Japanese football player who plays for Seriole Okinawa.

== Club career stats ==
'Updated to 23 February 2019.

Appearances and goals by club, season and competition
Club	Season	League			Emperor's Cup		J.League Cup		Total	
Club	Season	Division	Apps	Goals	Apps	Goals	Apps	Goals	Apps	Goals
Hokkaido; Consadole Sapporo	2009	J2 League	25	3	1	0	—		26	3
Hokkaido; Consadole Sapporo	2010	J2 League	9	0	0	0	—		9	0
Hokkaido; Consadole Sapporo	2011	J2 League	25	2	1	0	—		26	2
Hokkaido; Consadole Sapporo	2012	J1 League	11	3	1	1	2	0	14	4
Hokkaido; Consadole Sapporo	2013	J2 League	40	5	2	0	—		42	5
Hokkaido; Consadole Sapporo	2014	J2 League	27	3	0	0	—		27	3
Hokkaido; Consadole Sapporo	2015	J2 League	13	2	3	1	—		16	3
Hokkaido; Consadole Sapporo	2016	J2 League	22	1	1	1	—		23	2
Hokkaido; Consadole Sapporo	2017	J1 League	4	0	1	0	7	2	12	2
Ehime FC	2018	J2 League	12	0	1	0	—		13	0
Career total			188	19	11	3	9	2	208	24
