= Shunsuke Iwanuma =

Japanese footballer

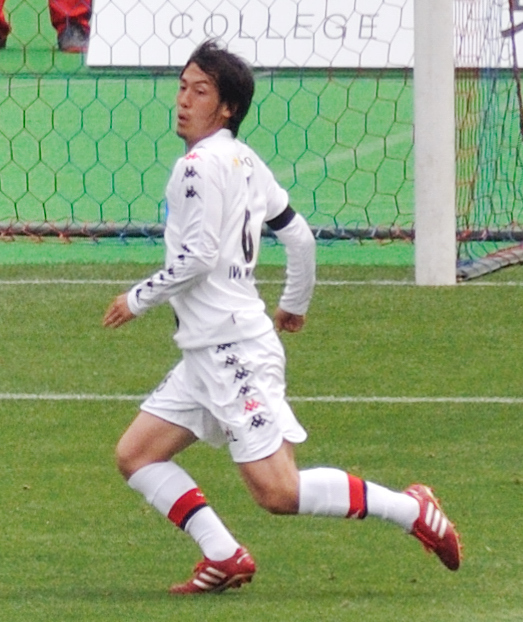

Personal information
- Date of birth: June 2, 1988 (age 38)
- Place of birth: Maebashi, Gunma, Japan
- Height: 1.75 m (5 ft 9 in)
- Position: Defender

Team information
- Current team: Nagano Parceiro
- Number: 6

Youth career
- 2004–2006: Maebashi Ikuei High School

Senior career*
Years	Team	Apps	(Gls)
2007–2012	Consadole Sapporo	89	(1)
2013–2015	Matsumoto Yamaga FC	94	(3)
2016	Kyoto Sanga FC	9	(1)
2017–	AC Nagano Parceiro		
- * Club domestic league appearances and goals as of 23 February 2017

Shunsuke Iwanuma (岩沼 俊介, Iwanuma Shunsuke; born June 2, 1988) is a Japanese football player who last played for Nagano Parceiro.

== Club statistics ==
Updated to 23 February 2017.

Club performance			League		Cup		League Cup		Total	
Season	Club	League	Apps	Goals	Apps	Goals	Apps	Goals	Apps	Goals
Japan			League		Emperor's Cup		J. League Cup		Total	
2007	Consadole Sapporo	J2 League	0	0	0	0	-		0	0
2008	Consadole Sapporo	J1 League	0	0	0	0	0	0	0	0
2009	Consadole Sapporo	J2 League	5	1	0	0	-		5	1
2010	Consadole Sapporo	J2 League	19	0	0	0	-		19	0
2011	Consadole Sapporo	J2 League	35	0	0	0	–		35	0
2012	Consadole Sapporo	J1 League	30	0	1	0	2	0	33	0
2013	Matsumoto Yamaga	J2 League	38	1	1	0	–		39	1
2014	Matsumoto Yamaga	J2 League	42	1	0	0	–		42	1
2015	Matsumoto Yamaga	J1 League	24	1	2	0	1	0	27	1
2016	Kyoto Sanga	J2 League	9	1	1	0	–		10	1
Career total			192	3	5	0	3	0	200	5
