= Yoshihiro Uchimura =

Japanese footballer

Yoshihiro Uchimura 内村 圭宏
Personal information
- Full name: Yoshihiro Uchimura
- Date of birth: August 24, 1984 (age 42)
- Place of birth: Oita, Japan
- Height: 1.74 m (5 ft 8 1/2 in)
- Position: Forward

Youth career
- 2000–2002: Oita High School

Senior career*
Years	Team	Apps	(Gls)
2003–2006	Oita Trinita	30	(2)
2007–2009	Ehime FC	121	(28)
2010–2018	Consadole Sapporo	236	(59)
2019	FC Imabari	27	(7)
Total		413	(96)
- * Club domestic league appearances and goals

Yoshihiro Uchimura (内村 圭宏, Uchimura Yoshihiro; born August 24, 1984) is a Japanese retired football player. He last played for FC Imabari.

== Playing career ==
Uchimura joined FC Imabari on 10 January 2019, but he retired after just one year and the promotion of the club to J3 League.

== Career statistics ==
As of 5 April 2020.

Appearances and goals by club, season and competition
Club	Season	League			Emperor's Cup		J.League Cup		Total	
Club	Season	Division	Apps	Goals	Apps	Goals	Apps	Goals	Apps	Goals
Oita Trinita	2003	J1 League	6	0	0	0	1	0	7	0
Oita Trinita	2004	J1 League	1	0	0	0	1	0	2	0
Oita Trinita	2005	J1 League	5	1	1	0	0	0	6	1
Oita Trinita	2006	J1 League	18	1	0	0	4	0	22	1
Ehime FC	2007	J2 League	40	6	2	0	—		42	6
Ehime FC	2008	J2 League	34	4	2	1	—		36	5
Ehime FC	2009	J2 League	47	18	1	1	—		48	19
Consadole Sapporo	2010	J2 League	28	5	1	0	—		29	5
Consadole Sapporo	2011	J2 League	27	12	0	0	—		27	12
Consadole Sapporo	2012	J1 League	27	2	1	0	2	0	30	2
Consadole Sapporo	2013	J2 League	32	17	0	0	—		32	17
Consadole Sapporo	2014	J2 League	29	5	0	0	—		29	5
Consadole Sapporo	2015	J2 League	35	7	0	0	—		35	7
Hokkaido; Consadole Sapporo	2016	J2 League	42	11	1	0	—		43	11
Hokkaido; Consadole Sapporo	2017	J1 League	15	0	1	0	4	0	20	0
Hokkaido; Consadole Sapporo	2018	J1 League	1	0	2	0	5	1	8	1
FC Imabari	JFL	2019	26	7	—		—		26	7
Career total			413	96	12	2	17	1	442	99
