= Yasuaki Okamoto =

Japanese footballer

Personal information
- Date of birth: April 9, 1988 (age 38)
- Place of birth: Kumamoto, Kumamoto, Japan
- Height: 1.70 m (5 ft 7 in)
- Position: Midfielder

Youth career
- 2004–2006: Luther Gakuin High School

Senior career*
Years	Team	Apps	(Gls)
2007–2013	Consadole Sapporo	147	(18)
2014–2017	Roasso Kumamoto	78	(6)
- * Club domestic league appearances and goals as of 2 February 2018

Yasuaki Okamoto (岡本 賢明, Okamoto Yasuaki; born April 9, 1988 in Kumamoto City) is a former Japanese football player who featured for Roasso Kumamoto.

== Career statistics ==
Updated to 2 February 2018.

Appearances and goals by club, season and competition
Club	Season	League			Emperor's Cup		J.League Cup		Total	
Club	Season	Division	Apps	Goals	Apps	Goals	Apps	Goals	Apps	Goals
Consadole Sapporo	2007	J2 League	9	2	1	0	–		10	2
Consadole Sapporo	2008	J1 League	13	0	0	0	5	0	18	0
Consadole Sapporo	2009	J2 League	23	4	0	0	–		23	4
Consadole Sapporo	2010	J2 League	17	2	2	2	–		19	4
Consadole Sapporo	2011	J2 League	25	4	1	0	–		26	4
Consadole Sapporo	2012	J1 League	30	0	1	0	4	1	35	1
Consadole Sapporo	2013	J2 League	30	6	0	0	–		30	6
Roasso Kumamoto	2014	J2 League	18	2	0	0	–		18	2
Roasso Kumamoto	2015	J2 League	18	2	2	0	–		20	2
Roasso Kumamoto	2016	J2 League	34	2	0	0	–		34	2
Roasso Kumamoto	2017	J2 League	8	0	0	0	–		8	0
Career total			225	24	7	2	9	1	241	27
