= Hironobu Haga =

Japanese footballer (born 1982)

Hironobu Haga 芳賀 博信
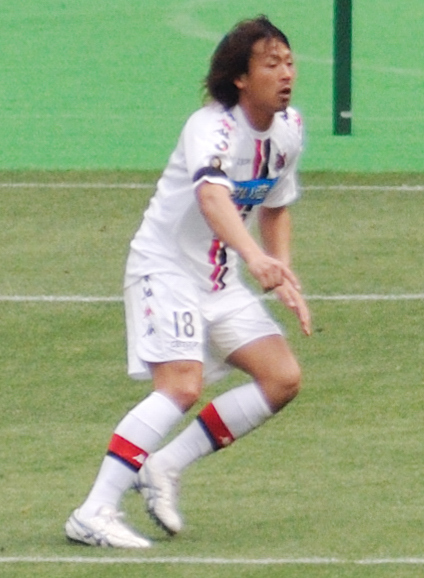

Personal information
- Full name: Hironobu Haga
- Date of birth: December 21, 1982 (age 43)
- Place of birth: Sendai, Japan
- Height: 1.73 m (5 ft 8 in)
- Position: Midfielder

Youth career
- 1998–2000: Sendai Ikuei High School
- 2001–2002: Sendai University

Senior career*
Years	Team	Apps	(Gls)
2004–2005	JEF United Chiba	1	(0)
2006–2012	Consadole Sapporo	210	(2)
Total		211	(2)
Medal record
JEF United Chiba
Winner	J.League Cup	2005
- * Club domestic league appearances and goals

Hironobu Haga (芳賀 博信, Haga Hironobu; born December 21, 1982) is a former Japanese football player.

== Career statistics ==
Appearances and goals by club, season and competition
Club	Season	League			Emperor's Cup		J.League Cup		Total	
Club	Season	Division	Apps	Goals	Apps	Goals	Apps	Goals	Apps	Goals
JEF United Ichihara	2004	J1 League	1	0	0	0	0	0	1	0
JEF United Chiba	2005	J1 League	0	0	0	0	0	0	0	0
Consadole Sapporo	2006	J2 League	46	0	4	0	—		50	0
Consadole Sapporo	2007	J2 League	47	1	0	0	—		47	1
Consadole Sapporo	2008	J1 League	26	0	0	0	5	0	31	0
Consadole Sapporo	2009	J2 League	34	1	2	0	—		36	1
Consadole Sapporo	2010	J2 League								
Career total			154	2	6	0	5	0	165	2
