= Junki Yokono =

Japanese footballer

Personal information
- Full name: Junki Yokono
- Date of birth: October 7, 1989 (age 37)
- Place of birth: Kitahiroshima, Japan
- Height: 1.83 m (6 ft 0 in)
- Position: Forward

Youth career
- 2005–2007: Consadole Sapporo (youth)

Senior career*
Years	Team	Apps	(Gls)
2008–2013	Consadole Sapporo	39	(7)
2012	→ Zweigen Kanazawa (loan)	9	(2)
2014	Khonkaen	19	(8)
2015	Fukushima United FC	26	(1)
2016	Bangkok	16	(2)
2017	ReinMeer Aomori	29	(10)
2018	Nara Club	24	(7)
2019–2020	FC Osaka	51	(5)
2022–2023	Hokkaido Tokachi Sky Earth	16	(14)
Total		229	(56)
- * Club domestic league appearances and goals

Junki Yokono (横野 純貴, Yokono Junki; born October 7, 1989) is a Japanese former footballer.

== Club statistics ==
Updated to 1 February 2024.

Club performance			League		Emperor's Cup		League Cup		Shakaijin Cup		Total	
Season	Club	League	Apps	Goals	Apps	Goals	Apps	Goals	Apps	Goals	Apps	Goals
Japan			League		Emperor's Cup		League Cup		Shakaijin Cup		Total	
2008	Consadole Sapporo	J1 League	1	0	0	0	0	0	–		1	0
2009	Consadole Sapporo	J2 League	5	0	0	0	–		–		5	0
2010	Consadole Sapporo	J2 League	10	0	2	0	–		–		12	0
2011	Consadole Sapporo	J2 League	14	4	1	1	–		–		15	5
2012	Consadole Sapporo	J1 League	1	0	–		0	0	–		1	0
2012	Zweigen Kanazawa	JFL	9	2	0	0	–		–		9	2
2013	Consadole Sapporo	J2 League	8	3	2	1	–		–		11	4
2015	Fukushima United FC	J3 League	26	1	1	0	–		–		27	1
2017	ReinMeer Aomori	JFL	29	10	–		–		–		29	10
2018	Nara Club	JFL	24	7	-		–		–		24	7
2019	FC Osaka	JFL	28	4	2	0	–		–		30	2
2020	FC Osaka	JFL	14	1	-		–		–		14	1
2021	FC Osaka	JFL	6	0	1	0	–		–		7	0
2022	Hokkaido Tokachi Sky Earth	Hokkaido Soccer League	10	9	–		–		1	1	11	10
2023	Hokkaido Tokachi Sky Earth	Hokkaido Soccer League	3	3	–		–		2	1	5	4
Career total			103	20	9	2	0	0	3	2	201	46
