= Hiroyuki Furuta =

Japanese footballer

Hiroyuki Furuta 古田 寛幸
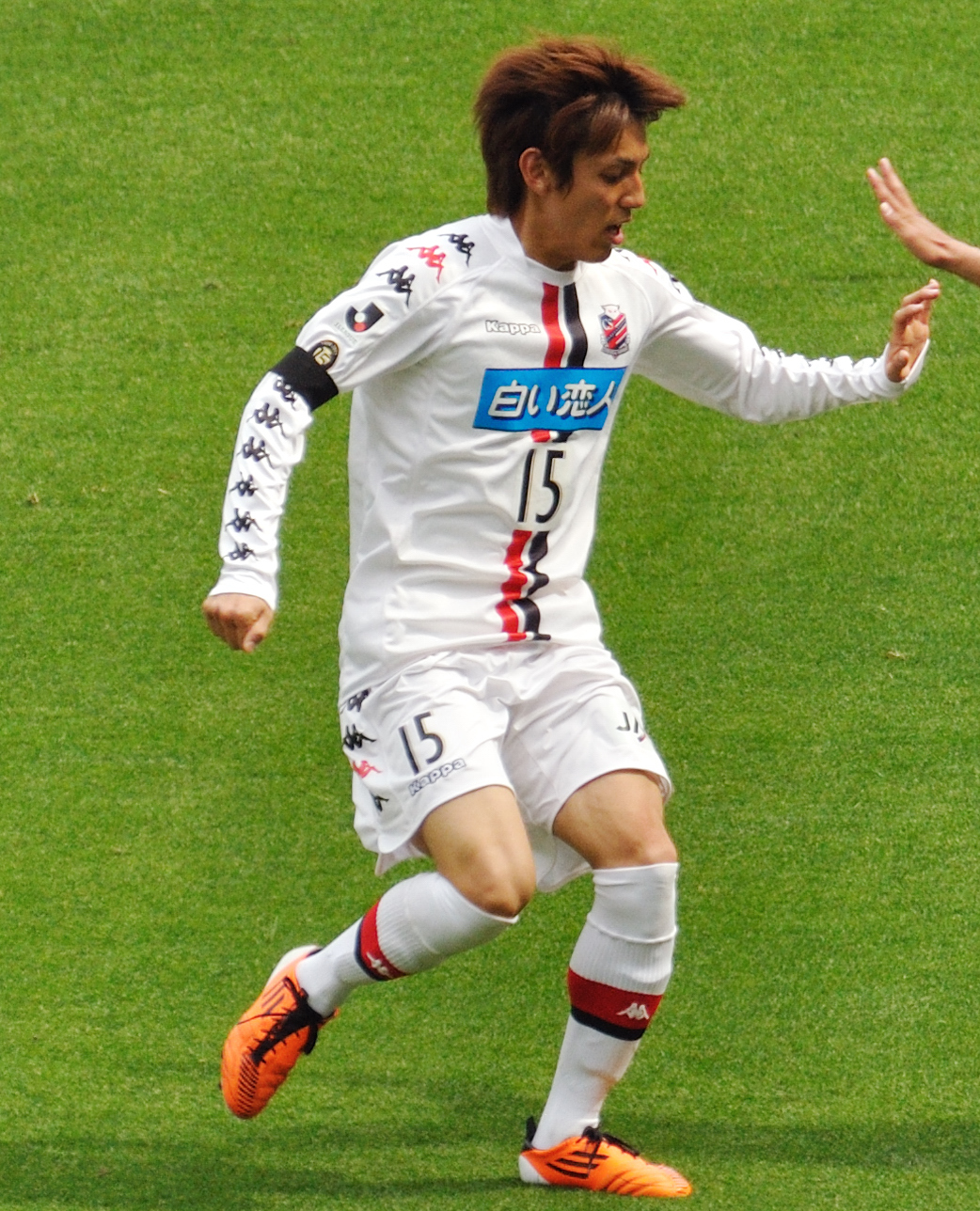

Personal information
- Full name: Hiroyuki Furuta
- Date of birth: 23 May 1991 (age 35)
- Place of birth: Sapporo, Hokkaidō, Japan
- Height: 1.70 m (5 ft 7 in)
- Position: Right winger

Youth career
- 2004–2009: Consadole Sapporo Youth

Senior career*
Years	Team	Apps	(Gls)
2009–2015	Consadole Sapporo	137	(14)
2014	→ Kamatamare Sanuki (loan)	14	(2)
2016–2017	Zweigen Kanazawa	23	(0)
2017	→ Blaublitz Akita (loan)	32	(2)
2018–2019	Blaublitz Akita	33	(1)

International career^{‡}
2009	Japan U-18	2	(0)
- * Club domestic league appearances and goals as of 14 January 2020 ‡ National team caps and goals as of 17 November 2009

Hiroyuki Furuta (古田 寛幸, Furuta Hiroyuki; born 23 May 1991) is a Japanese former football player.

== Career ==
Furuta retired at the end of the 2019 season.

== Career statistics ==
Updated to 14 January 2020.

Appearances and goals by club, season and competition
Club	Season	League		Cup^{1}		League Cup^{2}		Total	
Club	Season	Apps	Goals	Apps	Goals	Apps	Goals	Apps	Goals
Consadole Sapporo	2009	19	0	1	0	-		20	0
Consadole Sapporo	2010	23	5	1	0	-		24	5
Consadole Sapporo	2011	34	4	1	0	-		35	4
Consadole Sapporo	2012	28	4	1	0	1	0	30	4
Consadole Sapporo	2013	6	0	1	0	-		7	0
Consadole Sapporo	2014	5	0	-		-		5	0
Kamatamare Sanuki	2014	14	2	-		-		14	2
Consadole Sapporo	2015	22	1	1	0	-		23	1
Zweigen Kanazawa	2016	23	0	2	0	-		25	0
Blaublitz Akita	2017	32	2	1	0	-		33	2
Blaublitz Akita	2018	18	1	0	0	-		18	1
Blaublitz Akita	2019	15	0	0	0	-		15	0
Total		239	19	9	0	1	0	249	19

^{1}Includes Emperor's Cup. ^{2}Includes J. League Cup.

== National team career ==
As of 4 October 2010

=== Appearances in major competitions ===
Team	Competition	Category	Appearances		Goals	Team record
Team	Competition	Category	Start	Sub	Goals	Team record
Japan	2010 AFC U-19 Championship qualification	U-18	2	0	0	Qualified
Japan	2010 AFC U-19 Championship	U-19	0	1	0	

== Honours ==
Blaublitz Akita

- J3 League (1): 2017
