= 2005 Júbilo Iwata season =

Júbilo Iwata
2005 season
- Manager: Masakuni Yamamoto
- Stadium: Yamaha Stadium
- J. League 1: 6th
- Emperor's Cup: Quarterfinals
- J. League Cup: Quarterfinals
- AFC Champions League: Group stage
- Top goalscorer: Robert Cullen (13)
| Home colours | Away colours | Third colours |

The 2005 season was an average one for Júbilo Iwata. They came sixth in the J-League 1, advanced to the Quarterfinals in the Emperors and J-League Cups, and played a friendly against Real Madrid, which they lost.

== Competitions ==
| Competitions | Position |
|---|---|
| J. League 1 | 6th / 18 clubs |
| Emperor's Cup | Quarterfinals |
| J. League Cup | Quarterfinals |

== Domestic results ==
=== J. League 1 ===
==== League table ====
| Pos | Team | Pld | W | D | L | GF | GA | GD | Pts |
|---|---|---|---|---|---|---|---|---|---|
| 4 | JEF United Ichihara Chiba | 34 | 16 | 11 | 7 | 56 | 42 | +14 | 59 |
| 5 | Cerezo Osaka | 34 | 16 | 11 | 7 | 48 | 40 | +8 | 59 |
| 6 | Júbilo Iwata | 34 | 14 | 9 | 11 | 51 | 41 | +10 | 51 |
| 7 | Sanfrecce Hiroshima | 34 | 13 | 11 | 10 | 50 | 42 | +8 | 50 |
| 8 | Kawasaki Frontale | 34 | 15 | 5 | 14 | 54 | 47 | +7 | 50 |

Updated to match(es) played on December 3, 2005. Source: J. League Division 1
Rules for classification: 1) points; 2) goal difference; 3) number of goals scored.

==== Results summary ====
| Overall | | | | | | | | Home | | | | | | Away | | | | | |
| Pld | W | D | L | GF | GA | GD | Pts | W | D | L | GF | GA | GD | W | D | L | GF | GA | GD |
|---|---|---|---|---|---|---|---|---|---|---|---|---|---|---|---|---|---|---|---|
| 34 | 14 | 9 | 11 | 51 | 41 | +10 | 51 | 8 | 4 | 5 | 30 | 22 | +8 | 6 | 5 | 6 | 21 | 19 | +2 |

Source: J. League Data Site

==== Result round by round ====
| Round | 1 | 2 | 3 | 4 | 5 | 6 | 7 | 8 | 9 | 10 | 11 | 12 | 13 | 14 | 15 | 16 | 17 | 18 | 19 | 20 | 21 | 22 | 23 | 24 | 25 | 26 | 27 | 28 | 29 | 30 | 31 | 32 | 33 | 34 |
|---|---|---|---|---|---|---|---|---|---|---|---|---|---|---|---|---|---|---|---|---|---|---|---|---|---|---|---|---|---|---|---|---|---|---|
| Ground | A | H | H | A | H | A | A | H | A | H | A | H | H | A | H | A | H | A | H | A | H | A | H | A | H | A | H | A | H | A | H | A | A | H |
| Result | W | L | D | L | L | W | L | D | W | W | D | W | L | W | W | D | W | L | W | L | D | W | W | L | W | D | D | D | L | D | L | W | L | W |
| Position | 5 | 8 | 9 | 13 | 16 | 12 | 15 | 16 | 12 | 7 | 9 | 5 | 9 | 6 | 4 | 5 | 3 | 5 | 5 | 5 | 5 | 5 | 3 | 4 | 4 | 4 | 5 | 7 | 7 | 7 | 7 | 7 | 7 | 6 |

Source: J. League Data Site
A = Away; H = Home; W = Win; D = Draw; L = Loss

==== Matches ====
| 5 March 2005 1 | Yokohama F. Marinos | 0–1 | Júbilo Iwata | Yokohama |
| 16:04 | Nakanishi (yellow card) 89' | Report | M. Tanaka (yellow card) 6'; Kim Jin-kyu (yellow card) 55'; Nanami (yellow card) 60'; Fukunishi 89' | Stadium: Nissan Stadium; Attendance: 41,868; Referee: Okada |

| 13 March 2005 2 | Júbilo Iwata | 0–3 | Nagoya Grampus Eight | Iwata, Shizuoka |
| 15:34 | Maeda (yellow card) 49'; Hattori (yellow card) 56'; Kim Jin-kyu (yellow card) 62'; Fukunishi (yellow card) 64' | Report | Watanabe (yellow card) 6'; Claiton (yellow card) 21' (goal) 73'; Koga (yellow card) 32' (goal) 63'; Sugimoto 54'; Yamaguchi (yellow card) 82' | Stadium: Yamaha Stadium; Attendance: 16,251; Referee: Kazuhisa Osada |

| 2 April 2005 3 | Júbilo Iwata | 1–1 | Shimizu S-Pulse | Fukuroi, Shizuoka |
| 15:04 | Nishi (yellow card) 68'; Cullen 83' | Report | Morioka (yellow card) 28' (goal) 33'; Choi Tae-uk (yellow card) 44' | Stadium: Shizuoka Stadium ECOPA; Attendance: 37,384; Referee: Toshimitsu Yoshida |

| 10 April 2005 4 | FC Tokyo | 1–0 | Júbilo Iwata | Tokyo |
| 14:04 | Kurisawa 85' | Report | Cullen (yellow card) 68'; Nishi (yellow card) 72' | Stadium: Ajinomoto Stadium; Attendance: 32,049; Referee: Tsutomu Anazawa |

| 13 April 2005 5 | Júbilo Iwata | 1–3 | JEF United Chiba | Iwata, Shizuoka |
| 19:00 | Kim Jin-kyu (yellow card) 18'; Chano (yellow card) 22' (yellow-red card) 49'; Cullen 62' | Report | Y. Satō 12'; Saito 19'; Hanyu 61'; Yamagishi (yellow card) 89' | Stadium: Yamaha Stadium; Attendance: 9,854; Referee: Kenji Ogiya |

| 16 April 2005 6 | Albirex Niigata | 0–1 | Júbilo Iwata | Niigata |
| 19:04 | | Report | Naruoka 27'; Kikuchi (yellow card) 74' | Stadium: Niigata Stadium; Attendance: 40,387; Referee: Kiyoshi Ōta |

| 24 April 2005 7 | Kashima Antlers | 2–1 | Júbilo Iwata | Kashima |
| 15:04 | Fukai 1'; Ogasawara 17'; Ari (yellow card) 62'; Fernando (yellow card) 72' | Report | Ota 47'; Nishi (yellow card) 58'; Kikuchi (yellow card) 69'; Nakayama (yellow card) 83'; Cullen (yellow card) 89' | Stadium: Kashima Soccer Stadium; Attendance: 25,128; Referee: Yuichi Nishimura |

| 28 April 2005 8 | Júbilo Iwata | 2–2 | Urawa Red Diamonds | Fukuroi, Shizuoka |
| 19:04 | Maeda 19'; Fujita (yellow card) 44'; Kikuchi (yellow card) 76'; Nishi (yellow card) 78'; Nakayama 85' | Report | Alex (yellow card) 20'; T. Tanaka (yellow card) 26'; Emerson Sheik (yellow card) 37' (goal) 86'; Nagai 44'; Suzuki (yellow card) 59'; Uchidate (yellow card) 83' | Stadium: Shizuoka Stadium ECOPA; Attendance: 30,865; Referee: Masayoshi Okada |

| 1 May 2005 9 | Kashiwa Reysol | 0–4 | Júbilo Iwata | Kashiwa |
| 16:05 | Yamashita (yellow card) 3'; Cléber (yellow card) 55' | Report | Nakayama 4'; Maeda (yellow card) 10' (goal) 62'; Ota 11'; Kawaguchi 89' | Stadium: Kashiwanoha Stadium; Attendance: 12,837; Referee: Joji Kashihara |

| 4 May 2005 10 | Júbilo Iwata | 2–1 | Gamba Osaka | Iwata, Shizuoka |
| 14:05 | Maeda 33'; Cullen 78' | Report | Sidiclei (yellow card) 23'; Araújo 30' | Stadium: Yamaha Stadium; Attendance: 16,579; Referee: Hiroyoshi Takayama |

| 8 May 2005 11 | Vissel Kobe | 0–0 | Júbilo Iwata | Kobe |
| 16:05 | Kitamoto (yellow card) 17'; Matsuo (yellow card) 64' | Report | | Stadium: Kobe Wing Stadium; Attendance: 20,282; Referee: Toru Kamikawa |

| 15 May 2005 12 | Júbilo Iwata | 2–1 | Oita Trinita | Iwata, Shizuoka |
| 13:33 | Cullen 5'; Fukunishi (yellow card) 12'; Ota 51'; M. Tanaka (yellow card) 59' | Report | Dodô (yellow card) 9'; Arimura (yellow card) 32'; Shibakoya (yellow card) 44'; Magno Alves 65'; Fukaya (yellow card) 78' | Stadium: Yamaha Stadium; Attendance: 13,559; Referee: Toshimitsu Yoshida |

| 2 July 2005 13 | Júbilo Iwata | 1–2 | Kawasaki Frontale | Iwata, Shizuoka |
| 19:02 | Gral (yellow card) 15'; Nanami 89' | Report | Juninho (yellow card) 11' (goal) 29'; Taniguchi (yellow card) 12'; Nakamura (yellow card) 72'; Ito (yellow card) 80'; Hulk 85' | Stadium: Yamaha Stadium; Attendance: 11,686; Referee: Keiichi Sunakawa |

| 6 July 2005 14 | Omiya Ardija | 0–2 | Júbilo Iwata | Kumagaya |
| 19:06 | Davidson (yellow card) 10' | Report | Nishi 13'; Cullen 51' | Stadium: Kumagaya Athletic Stadium; Attendance: 7,436; Referee: Hiroyoshi Takayama |

| 9 July 2005 15 | Júbilo Iwata | 3–0 | Cerezo Osaka | Iwata, Shizuoka |
| 19:04 | Chano (yellow card) 4'; Suzuki (yellow card) 15'; Murai (yellow card) 44'; Maeda 51', 55', 70' | Report | | Stadium: Yamaha Stadium; Attendance: 9,858; Referee: Kazuhisa Osada |

| 13 July 2005 16 | Sanfrecce Hiroshima | 0–0 | Júbilo Iwata | Hiroshima |
| 19:02 | Shigehara (yellow card) 62'; Dininho (yellow card) 81' | Report | | Stadium: Big Arch; Attendance: 6,230; Referee: Kazuhiko Matsumura |

| 17 July 2005 17 | Júbilo Iwata | 6–0 | Tokyo Verdy 1969 | Iwata, Shizuoka |
| 19:02 | Nakayama 5'; Chano (yellow card) 22'; Maeda 30', 35'; Cullen 64', 87'; Ota 76' | Report | | Stadium: Yamaha Stadium; Attendance: 13,649; Referee: Kiyoshi Ota |

| 24 July 2005 18 | Nagoya Grampus Eight | 2–0 | Júbilo Iwata | Nagoya |
| 19:04 | Nakamura 16', 53'; Fujita (yellow card) 38'; Toyoda (yellow card) 58'; Nakayama (yellow card) 84' | Report | Maeda (yellow card) 44'; Suzuki (yellow card) 55'; Kawaguchi (yellow card) 87' | Stadium: Mizuho Park Athletics Stadium; Attendance: 16,483; Referee: Kenji Ogiya |

| 20 August 2005 19 | Júbilo Iwata | 3–1 | Yokohama F. Marinos | Fukuroi, Shizuoka |
| 19:02 | Cullen 1', 24'; Fukunishi (yellow card) 25'; Kawamura 89' | Report | Matsuda (yellow card) 73'; Kurihara 86' | Stadium: Shizuoka Stadium ECOPA; Attendance: 29,754; Referee: Keiichi Sunakawa |

| 24 August 2005 20 | Gamba Osaka | 3–1 | Júbilo Iwata | Kanazawa |
| 19:01 | Watanabe (yellow card) 35'; Fernandinho 66'; Hashimoto (yellow card) 72'; Araújo 73', 84' | Report | Maeda 24' (yellow card) 69'; Ota (yellow card) 49'; Chano (yellow card) 57' | Stadium: Ishikawa Athletics Stadium; Attendance: 19,129; Referee: Kenji Ogiya |

| 27 August 2005 21 | Júbilo Iwata | 1–1 | FC Tokyo | Iwata, Shizuoka |
| 19:05 | Kawamura (yellow card) 44'; Choi Yong-soo 80' | Report | Miura (yellow card) 15'; Baba (yellow card) 77'; Kurisawa 81' | Stadium: Yamaha Stadium; Attendance: 15,735; Referee: Yoshitsugu Katayama |

| 3 September 2005 22 | Oita Trinita | 1–2 | Júbilo Iwata | Ōita |
| 19:04 | Takamatsu 30'; Yoshida (yellow card) 32' | Report | Maeda 34'; Murai (yellow card) 50'; Kim Jin-kyu 89' | Stadium: Oita Stadium; Attendance: 28,143; Referee: Tsutomu Anazawa |

| 10 September 2005 23 | Júbilo Iwata | 2–0 | Omiya Ardija | Iwata, Shizuoka |
| 19:02 | Cullen 14'; Oi (yellow card) 33'; Ota 34'; M. Tanaka (yellow card) 51'; Funatani (yellow card) 55'; Fukunishi (yellow card) 58' | Report | Hisanaga (yellow card) 21'; Davidson (yellow card) 42'; Aratani (yellow card) 85' | Stadium: Yamaha Stadium; Attendance: 10,232; Referee: Kazuhisa Osada |

| 17 September 2005 24 | Cerezo Osaka | 2–0 | Júbilo Iwata | Osaka |
| 15:05 | Fabinho 17'; Nishizawa 36'; Shimomura (yellow card) 57'; Morishima (yellow card) 70' | Report | M. Tanaka (yellow card) 35'; Nakayama (yellow card) 86' | Stadium: Nagai Stadium; Attendance: 18,413; Referee: Akio Okutani |

| 24 September 2005 25 | Júbilo Iwata | 1–0 | Kashiwa Reysol | Iwata, Shizuoka |
| 15:36 | Nakayama 9'; Naruoka (yellow card) 72' | Report | Otani (yellow card) 15'; Masuda (yellow card) 35' | Stadium: Yamaha Stadium; Attendance: 11,589; Referee: Kazuhiko Matsumura |

| 1 October 2005 26 | Tokyo Verdy 1969 | 4–4 | Júbilo Iwata | Tokyo |
| 15:04 | Yamada (yellow card) 26' (yellow-red card) 89'; Washington 36', 64', 89'; Gil (yellow card) 42' (goal) 69'; Yoneyama (yellow card) 48'; Hirano (yellow card) 89' | Report | Kim Jin-kyu (yellow card) 50'; Nakayama 63'; Naruoka 71'; Nishi 79'; Fukunishi (yellow card) 80'; Ota 81'; Chano (yellow card) 89' | Stadium: Ajinomoto Stadium; Attendance: 35,257; Referee: Joji Kashihara |

| 16 October 2005 27 | Júbilo Iwata | 1–1 | Kashima Antlers | Fukuroi, Shizuoka |
| 15:05 | Nishi (yellow card) 27'; Cullen 59'; Ota (yellow card) 71'; Suzuki (yellow card) 87' | Report | Ogasawara (yellow card) 11'; Motoyama (yellow card) 18'; Masuda 46'; Ricardinho (yellow card) 71' | Stadium: Shizuoka Stadium ECOPA; Attendance: 29,465; Referee: Toru Kamikawa |

| 22 October 2005 28 | Shimizu S-Pulse | 1–1 | Júbilo Iwata | Shizuoka, Shizuoka |
| 19:04 | Saito (yellow card) 9'; Hyodo 66' | Report | Nishi 26'; Chano (yellow card) 84' | Stadium: Nihondaira Sports Stadium; Attendance: 16,220; Referee: Tsutomu Anazawa |

| 29 October 2005 29 | Júbilo Iwata | 1–3 | Sanfrecce Hiroshima | Iwata, Shizuoka |
| 15:34 | Nishi (yellow card) 38'; Nakayama 87' | Report | H. Satō (yellow card) 1' (goal) 58'; Oki 37'; Dininho (yellow card) 39'; Galvão (yellow card) 53' (goal) 54' | Stadium: Yamaha Stadium; Attendance: 10,654; Referee: Toshimitsu Yoshida |

| 12 November 2005 30 | JEF United Chiba | 2–2 | Júbilo Iwata | Ichihara |
| 16:06 | Abe 25'; Stoyanov (yellow card) 31'; Y. Satō 34' | Report | Chano (yellow card) 15'; Nishi (yellow card) 36'; Suzuki (yellow card) 39'; Naruoka (yellow card) 55'; Maeda 61' (yellow card) 66'; Ota 72' | Stadium: Fukuda Denshi Arena; Attendance: 17,080; Referee: Kenji Ogiya |

| 20 November 2005 31 | Júbilo Iwata | 2–3 | Albirex Niigata | Iwata, Shizuoka |
| 14:00 | Cullen 84'; Fukunishi 86' | Report | Fabinho (yellow card) 2'; Edmílson 68', 70', 83' | Stadium: Yamaha Stadium; Attendance: 13,596; Referee: Keiichi Sunakawa |

| 23 November 2005 32 | Kawasaki Frontale | 0–2 | Júbilo Iwata | Kawasaki |
| 15:01 | Nakamura (yellow card) 72'; Marcus (yellow card) 81' | Report | Maeda 24'; Suzuki (yellow card) 37'; Naruoka (yellow card) 38'; Cullen 88'; Nanami (yellow card) 89' | Stadium: Todoroki Stadium; Attendance: 15,430; Referee: Yuichi Nishimura |

| 26 November 2005 33 | Urawa Red Diamonds | 1–0 | Júbilo Iwata | Saitama |
| 15:03 | Marić (yellow card) 62' unknown 79' (o.g.); Hasebe (yellow card) 88' | Report | Hattori (yellow card) 21'; Nakayama (yellow card) 58'; Kim Jin-kyu (yellow card) 61'; Fukunishi (red card) 72' | Stadium: Saitama Stadium 2002; Attendance: 54,883; Referee: Toru Kamikawa |

| 3 December 2005 34 | Júbilo Iwata | 1–0 | Vissel Kobe | Iwata, Shizuoka |
| 14:04 | Chano 72' | Report | Komoto (yellow card) 32' | Stadium: Yamaha Stadium; Attendance: 13,330; Referee: Hiroyoshi Takayama |

=== Emperor's Cup ===
Júbilo Iwata received a bye to the fourth round as being part of the J.League Division 1.

| 3 November 2005 Fourth Round | Júbilo Iwata | 4–0 | Sagan Tosu | Iwata, Shizuoka |
| 13:00 | Nishi 15', 90'; Naruoka 33'; Cullen 62' (yellow card) 68' | Report | Hamada (yellow card) 35' | Stadium: Yamaha Stadium; Attendance: 3,980; Referee: Takuji Shiokawa |

| 10 December 2005 Fifth Round | Júbilo Iwata | 2–1 (a.e.t.) | Albirex Niigata | Iwata, Shizuoka |
| 13:00 | Fukunishi (yellow card) 54' (goal) 79'; Hattori (yellow card) 64'; Cullen (yellow card) 71'; Tanaka 115' | Report | Kaimoto (yellow card) 37' (yellow-red card) 57'; Hagimura (yellow card) 41'; Umeyama (yellow card) 51'; Ueno 89'; Edmílson (yellow card) 99'; Sueoka (yellow card) 115' | Stadium: Yamaha Stadium; Attendance: 5,072; Referee: Tsutomu Anazawa |

| 24 December 2005 Quarter-finals | Júbilo Iwata | 0–1 | Shimizu S-Pulse | Iwata, Shizuoka |
| 13:02 | Fukunishi (yellow card) 17' | Report | Hiramatsu (yellow card) 88'; Marquinhos 89' | Stadium: Yamaha Stadium; Attendance: 7,354; Referee: Masaaki Iemoto |

=== J. League Cup ===
Júbilo Iwata received a bye to the quarter-finals in order to avoid scheduling conflicts due to their participation in the AFC Champions League.

Quarter-finals

| 6 August 2005 1st Leg | JEF United Chiba | 3–2 | Júbilo Iwata | Tokyo |
| 18:30 | Hanyu 6' (yellow card) 55' (yellow-red card) 89'; Haas (yellow card) 16'; Nakajima 30'; Stoyanov (yellow card) 36'; Yoda 84' | Report | Kawamura (yellow card) 29'; Maeda 44'; Nakayama (yellow card) 81'; Kikuchi 88' | Stadium: National Stadium; Attendance: 10,522; Referee: Hajime Matsuo |

| 13 August 2005 2nd Leg | Júbilo Iwata | 2–2 (4–5 agg.) | JEF United Chiba | Iwata, Shizuoka |
| 19:05 | Maeda 60'; Kim Jin-kyu 68' | Report | Yamagishi (yellow card) 22'; Maki 35'; Saito (yellow card) 59'; Abe 65'; Hayashi (yellow card) 71'; Kudo (yellow card) 89' | Stadium: Yamaha Stadium; Attendance: 9,574; Referee: Masayoshi Okada |

== International results ==
=== AFC Champions League ===
Júbilo Iwata qualified for this tournament as winners of the 2003 Emperor's Cup.

| Team | Pld | W | D | L | GF | GA | GD | Pts |
|---|---|---|---|---|---|---|---|---|
| (China) Shenzhen Jianlibao | 6 | 4 | 1 | 1 | 9 | 3 | +6 | 13 |
| (South Korea) Suwon Samsung Bluewings | 6 | 4 | 1 | 1 | 14 | 3 | +11 | 13 |
| (Japan) Jubilo Iwata | 6 | 3 | 0 | 3 | 11 | 4 | +7 | 9 |
| (Vietnam) Hoang Anh Gia Lai | 6 | 0 | 0 | 6 | 1 | 25 | −24 | 0 |

| 9 March 2005 1 | Shenzhen Jianlibao (China) | 1–0 | (Japan) Júbilo Iwata | Shenzhen |
| | Li Yi 56' | Report | | Stadium: Shenzhen Stadium |

| 16 March 2005 2 | Júbilo Iwata (Japan) | 6–0 | (Vietnam) Hoang Anh GL | Iwata, Shizuoka |
| | Nishi 23'; Choi Yong-soo 29', 58'; Gral 67', 90'; Cullen 76' | Report | | Stadium: Yamaha Stadium |

| 6 April 2005 3 | Júbilo Iwata (Japan) | 0–1 | (South Korea) Suwon Samsung Bluewings | Iwata, Shizuoka |
| | | Report | Nádson 30' | Stadium: Yamaha Stadium |

| 20 April 2005 4 | Suwon Samsung Bluewings (South Korea) | 2–1 | (Japan) Júbilo Iwata | Suwon |
| | Kim Nam-il 62'; Sandro 85' | Report | Fujita 4' | Stadium: Suwon World Cup Stadium |

| 11 May 2005 5 | Júbilo Iwata (Japan) | 3–0 | (China) Shenzhen Jianlibao | Iwata, Shizuoka |
| | Funatani 56'; Ota 80', 86' | Report | | Stadium: Yamaha Stadium |

| 25 May 2005 6 | Hoang Anh GL (Vietnam) | 0–1 | (Japan) Júbilo Iwata | Pleiku |
| | | Report | Kawaguchi 16' | Stadium: Pleiku Stadium |

=== Friendlies ===
| 27 July 2005 International friendly | Júbilo Iwata (Japan) | 1–3 | (Spain) Real Madrid | Tokyo |
| 19:00 (JST) | Maeda 23' | Report | Raúl 3'; Ronaldo 28' (pen.), 90' (yellow card) 88' | Stadium: Ajinomoto Stadium |

== Player statistics ==
| No. | Pos. | Player | D.o.B. (Age) | Height / Weight | J. League 1 | | Emperor's Cup | | J. League Cup | | Total | |
| No. | Pos. | Player | D.o.B. (Age) | Height / Weight | Apps | Goals | Apps | Goals | Apps | Goals | Apps | Goals |
|---|---|---|---|---|---|---|---|---|---|---|---|---|
| 1 | GK | Yoshikatsu Kawaguchi | August 15, 1975 (aged 29) | cm / kg | 29 | 0 | | | | | | |
| 2 | DF | Hideto Suzuki | October 7, 1974 (aged 30) | cm / kg | 12 | 0 | | | | | | |
| 3 | DF | Takayuki Chano | November 23, 1976 (aged 28) | cm / kg | 28 | 1 | | | | | | |
| 4 | MF | Takahiro Kawamura | October 4, 1979 (aged 25) | cm / kg | 16 | 1 | | | | | | |
| 5 | DF | Makoto Tanaka | August 8, 1975 (aged 29) | cm / kg | 30 | 0 | | | | | | |
| 6 | MF | Toshihiro Hattori | September 23, 1973 (aged 31) | cm / kg | 28 | 0 | | | | | | |
| 7 | MF | Hiroshi Nanami | November 28, 1972 (aged 32) | cm / kg | 26 | 1 | | | | | | |
| 8 | FW | Rodrigo Gral | February 21, 1977 (aged 28) | cm / kg | 5 | 0 | | | | | | |
| 9 | FW | Masashi Nakayama | September 23, 1967 (aged 37) | cm / kg | 29 | 6 | | | | | | |
| 10 | MF | Toshiya Fujita | October 4, 1971 (aged 33) | cm / kg | 10 | 0 | | | | | | |
| 11 | MF | Norihiro Nishi | May 9, 1980 (aged 24) | cm / kg | 19 | 3 | | | | | | |
| 13 | FW | Nobuo Kawaguchi | April 10, 1975 (aged 29) | cm / kg | 8 | 1 | | | | | | |
| 14 | MF | Shinji Murai | December 1, 1979 (aged 25) | cm / kg | 30 | 0 | | | | | | |
| 15 | MF | Hitoshi Morishita | September 21, 1972 (aged 32) | cm / kg | 0 | 0 | | | | | | |
| 16 | FW | Choi Yong-Soo | September 10, 1973 (aged 31) | cm / kg | 15 | 1 | | | | | | |
| 17 | MF | Yoshiaki Ota | June 11, 1983 (aged 21) | cm / kg | 30 | 7 | | | | | | |
| 18 | FW | Ryoichi Maeda | October 9, 1981 (aged 23) | cm / kg | 25 | 12 | | | | | | |
| 19 | MF | Sho Naruoka | May 31, 1984 (aged 20) | cm / kg | 18 | 2 | | | | | | |
| 20 | DF | Kentaro Ohi | May 14, 1984 (aged 20) | cm / kg | 4 | 0 | | | | | | |
| 21 | GK | Yohei Sato | November 22, 1972 (aged 32) | cm / kg | 6 | 0 | | | | | | |
| 22 | FW | Robert Cullen | June 7, 1985 (aged 19) | cm / kg | 31 | 13 | | | | | | |
| 23 | MF | Takashi Fukunishi | September 1, 1976 (aged 28) | cm / kg | 23 | 2 | | | | | | |
| 24 | DF | Kohei Matsushita | July 24, 1985 (aged 19) | cm / kg | 0 | 0 | | | | | | |
| 25 | DF | Shun Morishita | May 11, 1986 (aged 18) | cm / kg | 1 | 0 | | | | | | |
| 26 | DF | Yasumasa Nishino | September 14, 1982 (aged 22) | cm / kg | 0 | 0 | | | | | | |
| 26 | FW | Camara | January 22, 1986 (aged 19) | cm / kg | 0 | 0 | | | | | | |
| 27 | MF | Naoya Kikuchi | November 24, 1984 (aged 20) | cm / kg | 9 | 0 | | | | | | |
| 28 | MF | Keisuke Funatani | January 7, 1986 (aged 19) | cm / kg | 14 | 0 | | | | | | |
| 29 | FW | Takashi Fujii | April 28, 1986 (aged 18) | cm / kg | 0 | 0 | | | | | | |
| 30 | GK | Naoki Hatta | June 24, 1986 (aged 18) | cm / kg | 0 | 0 | | | | | | |
| 31 | GK | Kenya Matsui | September 10, 1985 (aged 19) | cm / kg | 0 | 0 | | | | | | |
| 32 | GK | Hiromasa Yamamoto | June 5, 1979 (aged 25) | cm / kg | 0 | 0 | | | | | | |
| 33 | MF | Kota Ueda | May 9, 1986 (aged 18) | cm / kg | 0 | 0 | | | | | | |
| 34 | MF | Go Nakamura | November 19, 1986 (aged 18) | cm / kg | 0 | 0 | | | | | | |
| 35 | FW | Tatsuya Okamoto | September 19, 1986 (aged 18) | cm / kg | 0 | 0 | | | | | | |
| 36 | DF | Kim Jin-Kyu | February 16, 1985 (aged 20) | cm / kg | 24 | 1 | | | | | | |

== Other pages ==
- (in Japanese) J. League official site
