= 2001 J.League Cup final =

Yokohama F. Marinos	Júbilo Iwata
0	0
- Yokohama F. Marinos won 3–1 on penalties
- Date: October 27, 2001
- Venue: National Stadium, Tokyo

The 2001 J.League Cup final was the 9th final of the J.League Cup competition. The final was played at National Stadium in Tokyo on October 27, 2001. Yokohama F. Marinos won the championship.

== Match details ==
October 27, 2001

Yokohama F. Marinos	0–0	Júbilo Iwata
	Report
Penalties
	3–1

National Stadium

Yokohama F. Marinos
GK	16	(Japan) Tatsuya Enomoto
DF	5	(Japan) Norio Omura
DF	3	(Japan) Naoki Matsuda
DF	4	(Japan) Yasuhiro Hato
MF	15	(Japan) Tomokazu Hirama	(substituted off) 105'
MF	8	(Japan) Akihiro Endo	(substituted off) 90'
MF	13	(Japan) Kunio Nagayama
MF	32	(Brazil) Dutra
MF	10	(Japan) Shunsuke Nakamura
FW	9	(Brazil) Brito	(substituted off) 114'
FW	11	(Japan) Shoji Jo	(substituted off) 114'
Substitutes:
GK	30	(Japan) Kenichi Shimokawa
DF	7	(Brazil) Naza	(substituted on) 105'
MF	22	(Japan) Yuki Kaneko	(substituted on) 90'
FW	17	(Japan) Ryosuke Kijima	(substituted on) 114'
FW	29	(Japan) Daisuke Sakata	(substituted on) 114'
Manager:
(Brazil) Lazaroni

Júbilo Iwata
GK	12	(Japan) Tomoaki Ogami
DF	2	(Japan) Hideto Suzuki
DF	5	(Japan) Makoto Tanaka
DF	3	(Japan) Go Oiwa
MF	11	(Japan) Norihiro Nishi	(substituted off) 67'
MF	22	(Japan) Takahiro Kawamura	(substituted off) 90'
MF	6	(Japan) Toshihiro Hattori	(substituted off) 104'
MF	20	(Japan) Jo Kanazawa
MF	10	(Japan) Toshiya Fujita
FW	18	(Japan) Norihisa Shimizu
FW	9	(Japan) Masashi Nakayama
Substitutes:
GK	21	(Japan) Hiromasa Yamamoto
DF	14	(Japan) Takahiro Yamanishi
MF	15	(Socialist Federal Republic of Yugoslavia) Zivkovic	(substituted on) 90'
MF	13	(Japan) Nobuo Kawaguchi	(substituted on) 67'
FW	24	(Japan) Ryoichi Maeda	(substituted on) 104'
Manager:
(Japan) Masakazu Suzuki

== See also ==
- 2001 J.League Cup
