= 2003 Júbilo Iwata season =

Júbilo Iwata
2003 season
- Manager: Masaaki Yanagishita
- Stadium: Júbilo Iwata Stadium
- J.League 1: Runners-up
- Japanese Super Cup: Champions
- Emperor's Cup: Champions
- J.League Cup: Semifinals
- A3 Champions Cup: 4th
- Top goalscorer: Gral (21)
Home colours	Away colours	Third colours

2003 Júbilo Iwata season

== Competitions ==
Competitions	Position
J.League 1	Runners-up / 16 clubs
Emperor's Cup	Champions
J.League Cup	Semifinals

== Domestic results ==
=== J.League 1 ===
==== First stage ====
===== League table =====
Pos	Team	Pld	W	D	L	GF	GA	GD	Pts	Qualification
1	Yokohama F. Marinos (A)	15	10	2	3	29	16	+13	32	Qualification for Suntory Championship
2	Júbilo Iwata	15	9	4	2	34	17	+17	31	
3	JEF United Ichihara	15	8	3	4	33	20	+13	27	
4	FC Tokyo	15	7	4	4	14	11	+3	25	
5	Cerezo Osaka	15	8	1	6	29	29	0	25	

Updated to match(es) played on August 2, 2003. Source: J. League Division 1
Rules for classification: 1) points; 2) goal difference; 3) number of goals scored.
(A) Advance to a further round

===== Results summary =====
Overall								Home						Away					
Pld	W	D	L	GF	GA	GD	Pts	W	D	L	GF	GA	GD	W	D	L	GF	GA	GD
15	9	4	2	34	17	+17	31	5	2	1	20	9	+11	4	2	1	14	8	+6

Source: J. League Data Site

===== Result round by round =====
Round	1	2	3	4	5	6	7	8	9	10	11	12	13	14	15
Ground	H	A	H	A	H	A	H	H	A	H	A	A	H	A	H
Result	L	D	W	W	W	D	W	W	W	D	L	W	D	W	W
Position	15	13	10	5	4	4	3	1	1	1	3	2	3	2	2

Source: J. League Data Site
A = Away; H = Home; W = Win; D = Draw; L = Loss

===== Matches =====
21 March 2003 1	Júbilo Iwata	2–4	Yokohama F. Marinos	Fukuroi, Shizuoka
14:04	Maeda 11'; Fujita 26'; Nishino (yellow card) 80'; Nishi (yellow card) 85'	Report	Endō 7'; Sato 9'; Oku 48'; Marquinhos 69'	Stadium: Shizuoka Stadium ECOPA; Attendance: 32,930; Referee: Masayoshi Okada

5 April 2003 2	Gamba Osaka	1–1	Júbilo Iwata	Osaka
16:04	Arce (yellow card) 39'; Oguro 58'; Matsuyo (yellow card) 84'; Miyamoto (yellow card) 86'	Report	Gral 89'	Stadium: Expo '70 Commemorative Stadium; Attendance: 15,459; Referee: Toru Kamikawa

12 April 2003 3	Júbilo Iwata	1–0	Urawa Red Diamonds	Iwata, Shizuoka
15:33	Fujita (yellow card) 50' (goal) 58'; Nakayama (yellow card) 73'	Report	Yamada (yellow card) 48'	Stadium: Júbilo Iwata Stadium; Attendance: 13,822; Referee: Naotsugu Fuse

19 April 2003 4	Shimizu S-Pulse	0–2	Júbilo Iwata	Fukuroi, Shizuoka
15:06	Ahn Jung-hwan (yellow card) 63'	Report	Fujita (yellow card) 15' (goal) 65'; Gral 69'	Stadium: Shizuoka Stadium ECOPA; Attendance: 32,528; Referee: Kiyoshi Ota

26 April 2003 5	Júbilo Iwata	1–0	Vissel Kobe	Iwata, Shizuoka
14:04	Nishi (yellow card) 19'; Živković (yellow card) 35'; Suzuki (yellow card) 64'; Gral 66'	Report	Sugawara (yellow card) 40'; Sidiclei (yellow card) 66'	Stadium: Júbilo Iwata Stadium; Attendance: 11,215; Referee: Yoshitsugu Katayama

29 April 2003 6	Vegalta Sendai	1–1	Júbilo Iwata	Rifu
15:04	Abe (yellow card) 44'; Ishii (yellow card) 63'; Silvinho (yellow card) 75'; Éder 81' (yellow card) 81'; Iwamoto (yellow card) 85'	Report	Nanami 28'; Nishi (yellow card) 44'; Fukunishi (yellow card) 64'; Suzuki (yellow card) 79'; Tanaka (yellow card) 89'	Stadium: Miyagi Stadium; Attendance: 33,443; Referee: Toru Kamikawa

5 May 2003 7	Júbilo Iwata	7–2	Tokyo Verdy 1969	Fukuroi, Shizuoka
14:03	Fujita 13' (yellow card) 33'; Fukunishi 16'; Gral 24', 60'; Nakayama 31'; Nanami 47' (yellow card) 79'; Uemoto (yellow card) 66'; Kawaguchi 89'	Report	Mboma 10', 67'; Yamada (yellow card) 50'; Miura (yellow card) 86'	Stadium: Shizuoka Stadium ECOPA; Attendance: 25,303; Referee: Kazuhisa Osada

11 May 2003 8	Júbilo Iwata	5–0	Kyoto Purple Sanga	Iwata, Shizuoka
15:05	Tanaka 38'; Nanami 44'; Fukunishi 58'; Živković (yellow card) 65'; Gral 70', 84'	Report	Matsui (yellow card) 5'; Ishimaru (yellow card) 60'; Suzuki (yellow card) 64'	Stadium: Júbilo Iwata Stadium; Attendance: 12,819; Referee: Joji Kashihara

17 May 2003 9	Cerezo Osaka	1–3	Júbilo Iwata	Osaka
19:04	Nishizawa (yellow card) 19'; Ōkubo (yellow card) 22' (goal) 26'; Kudo (yellow card) 24' (yellow-red card) 29'	Report	Nakayama 8', 59'; Gral 30'; Hattori (yellow card) 42'	Stadium: Nagai Stadium; Attendance: 22,931; Referee: Naotsugu Fuse

24 May 2003 10	Júbilo Iwata	1–1	Nagoya Grampus Eight	Iwata, Shizuoka
19:04	Živković (yellow card) 69'; Fukunishi 83'	Report	Ueslei (yellow card) 22' (goal) 73'; Fujimoto (yellow card) 59'	Stadium: Júbilo Iwata Stadium; Attendance: 16,382; Referee: Kiyoshi Ota

5 July 2003 11	Kashima Antlers	5–2	Júbilo Iwata	Kashima
19:05	Fernando 8', 13'; Ōiwa 16'; Yanagisawa (yellow card) 39' (goal) 44'; Euller 71'; Ogasawara (yellow card) 77'	Report	van Zwam (red card) 11'; Gral (yellow card) 33' (goal) 52'; Hattori (yellow card) 35'; Maeda (yellow card) 40' (goal) 50'; Nishi (yellow card) 54'; Fukunishi (yellow card) 74'	Stadium: Kashima Soccer Stadium; Attendance: 39,684; Referee: Masayoshi Okada

13 July 2003 12	Oita Trinita	0–4	Júbilo Iwata	Ōita
19:04	Terakawa (yellow card) 27'	Report	Hattori 17'; Gral 28', 41'; Nishi (yellow card) 32'; Fukunishi (yellow card) 42'; Živković 89'	Stadium: Ōita Stadium; Attendance: 34,823; Referee: Joji Kashihara

20 July 2003 13	Júbilo Iwata	2–2	JEF United Ichihara	Iwata, Shizuoka
19:04	Kawamura (yellow card) 14'; Gral 27'; Yamanishi (yellow card) 42'; Maeda 76'	Report	Chano (yellow card) 31'; Sandro (yellow card) 33' (goal) 75'; Choi Yong-soo 50'; Saito (yellow card) 54'; Milinovič (yellow card) 70'	Stadium: Júbilo Iwata Stadium; Attendance: 16,519; Referee: Toshimitsu Yoshida

26 July 2003 14	Kashiwa Reysol	0–1	Júbilo Iwata	Tokyo
19:02	Hirayama (yellow card) 76'; Márcio (yellow card) 78'	Report	Nishi (yellow card) 8'; Fukunishi (yellow card) 28'; Fujita 55'; Hattori (yellow card) 62' (yellow-red card) 67'	Stadium: National Stadium; Attendance: 22,958; Referee: Toru Kamikawa

2 August 2003 15	Júbilo Iwata	1–0	FC Tokyo	Iwata, Shizuoka
19:04	Kawamura (yellow card) 35'; Fujita 75'	Report	Miura (yellow card) 17'; Baba (yellow card) 68'	Stadium: Júbilo Iwata Stadium; Attendance: 16,310; Referee: Masayoshi Okada

==== Second stage ====
Pos	Team	Pld	W	D	L	GF	GA	GD	Pts	Qualification
1	Yokohama F. Marinos (A)	15	7	5	3	27	17	+10	26	Qualification for Suntory Championship
2	JEF United Ichihara	15	7	5	3	24	18	+6	26	
3	Júbilo Iwata	15	7	5	3	22	17	+5	26	
4	Kashima Antlers	15	6	7	2	21	19	+2	25	
5	FC Tokyo	15	6	6	3	32	20	+12	24	

Updated to match(es) played on November 29, 2003. Source: J. League Division 1
Rules for classification: 1) points; 2) goal difference; 3) number of goals scored.
(A) Advance to a further round

Match	Date	Venue	Opponents	Score
2-1	2003.8.16	Saitama Stadium 2002	Urawa Red Diamonds	1-3
2-2	2003.8.23	Shizuoka Stadium	Shimizu S-Pulse	1-0
2-3	2003.8.30	Nishikyogoku Athletic Stadium	Kyoto Purple Sanga	0-1
2-4	2003.9.6	Yamaha Stadium	Cerezo Osaka	2-2
2-5	2003.9.13	Toyota Stadium	Nagoya Grampus Eight	2-2
2-6	2003.9.20	Yamaha Stadium	Kashima Antlers	1-1
2-7	2003.9.23	Ajinomoto Stadium	FC Tokyo	2-1
2-8	2003.9.28	Yamaha Stadium	Kashiwa Reysol	1-1
2-9	2003.10.4	Kobe Wing Stadium	Vissel Kobe	3-1
2-10	2003.10.18	Yamaha Stadium	Oita Trinita	2-0
2-11	2003.10.25	Ichihara Seaside Stadium	JEF United Ichihara	1-1
2-12	2003.11.8	Yamaha Stadium	Vegalta Sendai	1-0
2-13	2003.11.16	Ajinomoto Stadium	Tokyo Verdy 1969	2-1
2-14	2003.11.22	Yamaha Stadium	Gamba Osaka	2-1
2-15	2003.11.29	International Stadium Yokohama	Yokohama F. Marinos	1-2

==== Overall table ====
Pos	Team	Pld	W	D	L	GF	GA	GD	Pts	Qualification or relegation
1	Yokohama F. Marinos (C)	30	17	7	6	56	33	+23	58	Qualification for AFC Champions League 2004 group stage
2	Júbilo Iwata	30	16	9	5	56	34	+22	57	Qualification for AFC Champions League 2004 group stage
3	JEF United Ichihara	30	15	8	7	57	38	+19	53	
4	FC Tokyo	30	13	10	7	46	31	+15	49	
5	Kashima Antlers	30	13	9	8	44	40	+4	48	

Updated to match(es) played on November 29, 2003. Source: J. League Division 1 first stage, J. League Division 1 second stage
Rules for classification: 1) points; 2) goal difference; 3) number of goals scored.
(C) Champions

=== Japanese Super Cup ===
Júbilo Iwata qualified for this tournament as winners of the 2002 J.League.

1 March 2003 Final	Júbilo Iwata	3–0	Kyoto Purple Sanga	Tokyo
13:33	Fukunishi (yellow card) 44'; Fujita 62'; Gral 73', 86'; Suzuki (yellow card) 77'; Nakayama (yellow card) 78'; Hattori (yellow card) 89'	Report	Kurobe (yellow card) 79'; Ishimaru (yellow card) 84'	Stadium: National Stadium; Attendance: 22,904; Referee: Joji Kashihara

=== Emperor's Cup ===
Match	Date	Venue	Opponents	Score
3rd round	2003..			-
4th round	2003..			-
Quarterfinals	2003..			-
Semifinals	2003..			-

=== J.League Cup ===
==== Group stage ====
Team	Pld	W	D	L	GF	GA	GD	Pts
Júbilo Iwata	6	3	1	2	13	8	+5	10
Urawa Red Diamonds	6	2	2	2	4	5	−1	8
Tokyo Verdy 1969	6	2	2	2	7	10	−3	8
Vissel Kobe	6	2	1	3	9	10	−1	7

8 March 2003 1	Júbilo Iwata	2–0	Urawa Red Diamonds	Kagoshima
14:30	Gral 63'; Nakayama (yellow card) 68'; Nishi (yellow card) 74'; Maeda 89'	Report	Muroi (yellow card) 47'; Hasebe (yellow card) 58' (yellow-red card) 67'; Kobayashi (yellow card) 63'	Stadium: Kagoshima Kamoike Stadium; Attendance: 8,012; Referee: Toshimitsu Yoshida

15 March 2003 2	Vissel Kobe	4–2	Júbilo Iwata	Kobe
14:00	Oséas (yellow card) 43' (goal) 55', 78', 83'; Harison 70'; Okano (yellow card) 78'	Report	Gral 60'; Živković (yellow card) 86'; Nakayama 89'	Stadium: Kobe Universiade Memorial Stadium; Attendance: 7,455; Referee: Kazuhiko Matsumura

9 April 2003 3	Júbilo Iwata	4–0	Tokyo Verdy 1969	Iwata, Shizuoka
19:03	Živković 35'; Kawamura (yellow card) 38'; Maeda 44', 85'; Nishino 86'	Report	Hayashi (yellow card) 24'	Stadium: Júbilo Iwata Stadium; Attendance: 7,022; Referee: Toshimitsu Yoshida

23 April 2003 4	Urawa Red Diamonds	0–0	Júbilo Iwata	Saitama
19:02	Hasebe (yellow card) 41'; Hirakawa (yellow card) 78'	Report	Nishi (yellow card) 43'; Yamanishi (yellow card) 60'; Tanaka (yellow card) 65'	Stadium: Urawa Komaba Stadium; Attendance: 14,781; Referee: Masayoshi Okada

2 July 2003 5	Júbilo Iwata	3–1	Vissel Kobe	Iwata, Shizuoka
19:00	Gral 28', 64'; Naruoka 81'	Report	Harison (yellow card) 22' (goal) 78'; Yamaguchi (yellow card) 71'	Stadium: Júbilo Iwata Stadium; Attendance: 8,071; Referee: Hiroyoshi Takayama

16 July 2003 6	Tokyo Verdy 1969	3–2	Júbilo Iwata	Tokyo
19:01	Mboma 6', 11', 73'; Yamada (yellow card) 89'	Report	Maeda 49'; Nishino 79'	Stadium: National Stadium; Attendance: 12,258; Referee: Kiyoshi Ōta

==== Knockout stage ====
Quarterfinals

13 August 2003 1st leg	Yokohama F. Marinos	0–1	Júbilo Iwata	Yokohama
19:02	Yoo Sang-chul (yellow card) 11'; Oku (yellow card) 12'; Matsuda (yellow card) 73'	Report	Živković (red card) 17'; Nishino 19' (yellow card) 49'; Nanami (yellow card) 20'; Kikuchi (yellow card) 32'; Fukunishi (yellow card) 33'; Gral (yellow card) 67'	Stadium: International Stadium; Attendance: 12,016; Referee: Akio Okutani

27 August 2003 2nd leg	Júbilo Iwata	3–0 (3–1 agg.)	Yokohama F. Marinos	Iwata, Shizuoka
19:00	Fukunishi (yellow card) 41'; Naruoka (yellow card) 53'; Gral 56'; Maeda 69'; Nishino 85'	Report	Sato (yellow card) 29'	Stadium: Júbilo Iwata Stadium; Attendance: 8,808; Referee: Kiyoshi Ōta

Semifinals

1 October 2003 1st leg	Kashima Antlers	0–1	Júbilo Iwata	Kashima
19:00	Fukai (yellow card) 52'; Hirase (yellow card) 76'; Fernando (yellow card) 83'	Report	Živković 87'	Stadium: Kashima Soccer Stadium; Attendance: 9,915; Referee: Toshimitsu Yoshida

8 October 2003 2nd leg	Júbilo Iwata	0–2 (1–2 agg.)	Kashima Antlers	Iwata, Shizuoka
19:00	Gral (yellow card) 7'; Tanaka (yellow card) 21'	Report	Honda (yellow card) 26'; Fernando (yellow card) 36' (goal) 47'; Motoyama 61'; Hirase (yellow card) 71'; Kaneko (yellow card) 77'	Stadium: Júbilo Iwata Stadium; Attendance: 11,471; Referee: Masayoshi Okada

== International results ==
=== A3 Champions Cup ===
Júbilo Iwata qualified for this tournament as winners of the 2002 J.League.

Pos	Team	Pld	W	D	L	GF	GA	GD	Pts
1	(Japan) Kashima Antlers (C)	3	2	1	0	5	1	+4	7
2	(China) Dalian Shide	3	2	0	1	5	5	0	6
3	(South Korea) Seongnam Ilhwa Chunma	3	1	1	1	4	3	+1	4
4	(Japan) Júbilo Iwata	3	0	0	3	0	5	−5	0

Source: RSSSF
(C) Champions

16 February 2003 1	Júbilo Iwata (Japan)	0–2	(South Korea) Seongnam Ilhwa Chunma	Tokyo, Japan
13:00		Report	Shin Tae-yong 25'; Kim Dae-eui 56'	Stadium: National Stadium; Attendance: 20,793

19 February 2003 2	Júbilo Iwata (Japan)	0–2	(Japan) Kashima Antlers	Tokyo, Japan
19:00		Report	Euller 8'; Yanagisawa 74'	Stadium: National Stadium; Attendance: 20,176

22 February 2003 3	Dalian Shide (China)	1–0	(Japan) Júbilo Iwata	Tokyo, Japan
16:30	Janković 8'	Report		Stadium: National Stadium; Attendance: 27,881

== Player statistics ==
No.	Pos.	Player	D.o.B. (Age)	Height / Weight	J.League 1		Emperor's Cup		J.League Cup		Total	
No.	Pos.	Player	D.o.B. (Age)	Height / Weight	Apps	Goals	Apps	Goals	Apps	Goals	Apps	Goals
1	GK	Arno van Zwam	September 16, 1969 (aged 33)	cm / kg	17	0						
2	DF	Hideto Suzuki	October 7, 1974 (aged 28)	cm / kg	29	0						
3	DF	Taikai Uemoto	June 1, 1982 (aged 20)	cm / kg	5	0						
4	MF	Takahiro Kawamura	October 4, 1979 (aged 23)	cm / kg	22	3						
5	DF	Makoto Tanaka	August 8, 1975 (aged 27)	cm / kg	30	1						
6	MF	Toshihiro Hattori	September 23, 1973 (aged 29)	cm / kg	26	1						
7	MF	Hiroshi Nanami	November 28, 1972 (aged 30)	cm / kg	27	3						
8	FW	Rodrigo Gral	February 21, 1977 (aged 26)	cm / kg	29	21						
9	FW	Masashi Nakayama	September 23, 1967 (aged 35)	cm / kg	12	3						
10	MF	Toshiya Fujita	October 4, 1971 (aged 31)	cm / kg	13	6						
11	MF	Norihiro Nishi	May 9, 1980 (aged 22)	cm / kg	24	1						
12	GK	Hiromasa Yamamoto	June 5, 1979 (aged 23)	cm / kg	12	0						
13	FW	Nobuo Kawaguchi	April 10, 1975 (aged 27)	cm / kg	19	1						
14	DF	Takahiro Yamanishi	April 2, 1976 (aged 26)	cm / kg	25	0						
15	MF	Aleksandar Živković	July 28, 1977 (aged 25)	cm / kg	22	3						
16	GK	Daisuke Matsushita	October 31, 1981 (aged 21)	cm / kg	0	0						
17	MF	Yoshiaki Ota	June 11, 1983 (aged 19)	cm / kg	0	0						
18	FW	Ryoichi Maeda	October 9, 1981 (aged 21)	cm / kg	28	7						
19	MF	Sho Naruoka	May 31, 1984 (aged 18)	cm / kg	12	0						
20	DF	Kentaro Ohi	May 14, 1984 (aged 18)	cm / kg	0	0						
21	GK	Toshiyasu Takahara	October 18, 1980 (aged 22)	cm / kg	2	0						
22	MF	Yuya Hikichi	May 2, 1983 (aged 19)	cm / kg	0	0						
23	MF	Takashi Fukunishi	September 1, 1976 (aged 26)	cm / kg	26	5						
24	FW	Takuya Hara	June 4, 1983 (aged 19)	cm / kg	0	0						
25	DF	Kenichi Kaga	September 30, 1983 (aged 19)	cm / kg	0	0						
26	DF	Yasumasa Nishino	September 14, 1982 (aged 20)	cm / kg	16	0						
27	MF	Naoya Kikuchi	November 24, 1984 (aged 18)	cm / kg	7	0						
28	GK	Yohei Sato	November 22, 1972 (aged 30)	cm / kg	0	0						
29	MF	Thiago	April 1, 1982 (aged 20)	cm / kg	0	0						

== Other pages ==
- (in Japanese) J. League official site
