= 2001 Júbilo Iwata season =

Júbilo Iwata
2001 season
- Manager: Masakazu Suzuki
- Stadium: Júbilo Iwata Stadium
- J.League 1: Runners-up
- Emperor's Cup: 4th Round
- J.League Cup: Runners-up
- Asian Club Championship: Runners-up
- FIFA Club World Championship: Cancelled
- Top goalscorer: Masashi Nakayama (16)
Home colours	Away colours

2001 Júbilo Iwata season

== Competitions ==
Competitions	Position
J.League 1	Runners-up / 16 clubs
Emperor's Cup	4th round
J.League Cup	Runners-up

== Domestic results ==
=== J.League 1 ===
==== First stage ====
Pos	Team	Pld	W	OTW	D	OTL	L	GF	GA	GD	Pts	Qualification
1	Júbilo Iwata	15	9	4	1	1	0	32	12	+20	36	Qualification to the Suntory Championship
2	JEF United Ichihara	15	7	3	0	2	3	35	26	+9	27	
3	Nagoya Grampus Eight	15	5	5	2	0	3	29	20	+9	27	
4	Shimizu S-Pulse	15	6	4	0	2	3	28	18	+10	26	
5	Gamba Osaka	15	7	2	0	3	3	29	22	+7	25	

10 March 2001 1	Júbilo Iwata	4–1	JEF United Ichihara	Iwata, Shizuoka
14:03 JST (UTC+09)	H. Suzuki (yellow card) 8'; Oku 25', 31'; Tanaka 77'; Nishi 89'	Report	Yoshida (yellow card) 28' (yellow-red card) 56'; T. Uemura (yellow card) 44'; Chano (yellow card) 52'; Satō 55'	Stadium: Júbilo Iwata Stadium; Attendance: 15,246; Referee: Akio Okutani

17 March 2001 2	Sanfrecce Hiroshima	1–4	Júbilo Iwata	Hiroshima
16:05 JST (UTC+09)	Sawada (yellow card) 5'; K. Uemura (yellow card) 26'; Moriyasu (yellow card) 71'; Takahashi 84'	Report	Fujita 22', 72'; T. Hattori 26'; H. Suzuki (yellow card) 68'; Takahara 88'	Stadium: Hiroshima Park Stadium; Attendance: 10,663; Referee: Leslie Mottram (Scotland)

31 March 2001 3	Júbilo Iwata	1–0	FC Tokyo	Iwata, Shizuoka
15:33 JST (UTC+09)	T. Hattori 29'; Nishi (yellow card) 75'	Report	Doi (yellow card) 28'; Lopes (yellow card) 40'; Fujiyama (yellow card) 44'	Stadium: Júbilo Iwata Stadium; Attendance: 13,753; Referee: Yasuhiro Matsuzaki

7 April 2001 4	Kashima Antlers	1–2	Júbilo Iwata	Tokyo
15:04 JST (UTC+09)	T. Suzuki (yellow card) 2' (goal) 4'; Fabiano (yellow card) 35' (yellow-red card) 61'	Report	Takahara 8'; Oku (yellow card) 38'; Oiwa (yellow card) 44'; H. Suzuki (yellow card) 51'; Fujita 54'	Stadium: National Stadium; Attendance: 35,221; Referee: Toru Kamikawa

14 April 2001 5	Júbilo Iwata	3–2	Cerezo Osaka	Iwata, Shizuoka
16:03 JST (UTC+09)	Tanaka (red card) 32'; Oku (yellow card) 35'; Takahara (yellow card) 44' (goal) 89'; Nanami 47'; Nakayama 54'; Fukunishi (yellow card) 71'	Report	Ōkubo 8' (red card) 32'; Nishitani 39'; Shimizu (yellow card) 65'; Manaka (yellow card) 89'	Stadium: Júbilo Iwata Stadium; Attendance: 10,576; Referee: Kiyoshi Ota

29 April 2001 6	Júbilo Iwata	3–0	Nagoya Grampus Eight	Iwata, Shizuoka
14:04 JST (UTC+09)	Takahara 65', 88'; Nakayama 74'; Živković (yellow card) 83'	Report	Koga (yellow card) 24' (yellow-red card) 89'; Okayama (yellow card) 69'; Yamaguchi (yellow card) 76'	Stadium: Júbilo Iwata Stadium; Attendance: 17,009; Referee: Hiroyuki Umemoto

3 May 2001 7	Urawa Red Diamonds	0–2	Júbilo Iwata	Tokyo
19:04 JST (UTC+09)	Tsuchihashi (yellow card) 13'; Yamada (yellow card) 56'; Nishino (yellow card) 60'; Nagai (yellow card) 89'	Report	Oku 14'; Fujita (yellow card) 58'; Nakayama 65'; T. Hattori (yellow card) 85'	Stadium: National Stadium; Attendance: 53,125; Referee: Leslie Mottram (Scotland)

6 May 2001 8	Júbilo Iwata	2–0	Gamba Osaka	Iwata, Shizuoka
14:04 JST (UTC+09)	Takahara 6'; Fujita 43'; H. Suzuki (yellow card) 86'	Report		Stadium: Júbilo Iwata Stadium; Attendance: 15,869; Referee: Kiyoshi Ota

12 May 2001 9	Shimizu S-Pulse	1–0 (a.e.t.)	Júbilo Iwata	Fukuroi, Shizuoka
15:03 JST (UTC+09)	Sawanobori (yellow card) 39'; Hiramatsu 104'	Report	Oku (yellow card) 36'	Stadium: Shizuoka Stadium; Attendance: 52,959; Referee: Leslie Mottram (Scotland)

19 May 2001 10	Júbilo Iwata	2–1 (a.e.t.)	Consadole Sapporo	Iwata, Shizuoka
15:04 JST (UTC+09)	Tanaka (yellow card) 17' (yellow-red card) 57'; Takahara 89'; H. Suzuki (yellow card) 96'; Oiwa 102'	Report	Biju (yellow card) 25'; Bando (yellow card) 52'; Wanami 63' (yellow card) 68'; Nonomura (yellow card) 81'; Mori (yellow card) 99'; Tabuchi (yellow card) 101'	Stadium: Júbilo Iwata Stadium; Attendance: 12,979; Referee: Masayoshi Okada

16 June 2001 11	Kashiwa Reysol	0–1	Júbilo Iwata	Kashiwa
15:04 JST (UTC+09)		Report	Nakayama 5'; T. Hattori 33'	Stadium: Kashiwanoha Park Stadium; Attendance: 17,788; Referee: Dick Jol (Netherlands)

23 June 2001 12	Júbilo Iwata	2–1 (a.e.t.)	Avispa Fukuoka	Iwata, Shizuoka
15:33 JST (UTC+09)	Shimizu (yellow card) 23'; T. Hattori 27' (yellow card) 44' (yellow-red card) 89'; Fukunishi (yellow card) 38'; Fujita (yellow card) 50'; Nishi (yellow card) 53' 111'; Živković (yellow card) 55'	Report	Yamashita 22'; Badea (yellow card) 28'; H. Hattori (yellow card) 83'; Hirajima (yellow card) 84'; Nakaharai (yellow card) 95'	Stadium: Júbilo Iwata Stadium; Attendance: 13,046; Referee: Hisaharu Kitamura

7 July 2001 13	Yokohama F. Marinos	1–2 (a.e.t.)	Júbilo Iwata	Yokohama
19:04 JST (UTC+09)	unknown 83' (o.g.); Maruyama (yellow card) 84'	Report	Oiwa 31' (yellow card) 89'; Takahara 100'	Stadium: International Stadium Yokohama; Attendance: 41,593; Referee: Dick Jol (Netherlands)

14 July 2001 14	Júbilo Iwata	2–1 (a.e.t.)	Tokyo Verdy 1969	Iwata, Shizuoka
19:03 JST (UTC+09)	van Zwam (yellow card) 66'; Nakayama 88'; Fujita 96'	Report	Kikuchi (yellow card) 41'; Hayashi 66'; Yamada (yellow card) 91'; Nishida (yellow card) 95'	Stadium: Júbilo Iwata Stadium; Attendance: 16,032; Referee: Shinichiro Obata

21 July 2001 15	Vissel Kobe	2–2 (a.e.t.)	Júbilo Iwata	Kobe
19:04 JST (UTC+09)	Miura 18'; Kitamoto (yellow card) 32'; Yabuta 44'	Report	T. Hattori (yellow card) 34'; Nakayama 51', 81' (yellow card) 116'; Živković (yellow card) 119'	Stadium: Kobe Universiade Memorial Stadium; Attendance: 24,287; Referee: Masayoshi Okada

==== Second stage ====
Pos	Team	Pld	W	OTW	D	OTL	L	GF	GA	GD	Pts	Qualification
1	Kashima Antlers (Note: Champion from 2000 J.League Division 1 and Cup-Winner 2000 Emperor's Cup)	15	10	3	0	0	2	36	19	+17	36	Qualification to the Suntory Championship
2	Júbilo Iwata	15	9	4	0	0	2	31	14	+17	35	
3	Sanfrecce Hiroshima	15	8	0	0	0	7	36	27	+9	24	
4	Shimizu S-Pulse	15	5	4	0	1	5	34	27	+7	23	
5	JEF United Ichihara	15	7	0	2	0	6	25	28	−3	23	

Notes:

1 September 2001 1	Júbilo Iwata	3–1	Shimizu S-Pulse	Fukuroi, Shizuoka
19:04 JST (UTC+09)	Fukunishi 2', 11' (yellow card) 43'; Oku (yellow card) 77'; Nishi (yellow card) 78'; Maeda 88'	Report	Toda (yellow card) 34'; Baron 85'	Stadium: Shizuoka Stadium; Attendance: 43,506; Referee: Toru Kamikawa

18 August 2001 2	Gamba Osaka	1–0	Júbilo Iwata	Suita, Osaka
18:35 JST (UTC+09)	Yoshihara (yellow card) 50'; Vital 73' (yellow card) 89'	Report	Hattori (yellow card) 79'; Fukunishi (yellow card) 80'	Stadium: Expo '70 Stadium; Attendance: 18,314; Referee: Kazuhisa Osada

25 August 2001 3	Júbilo Iwata	2–0	Vissel Kobe	Iwata, Shizuoka
19:04 JST (UTC+09)	Hattori 44'; Nakayama 89'; Yamanishi (yellow card) 89'	Report	Yabuta (yellow card) 31'; Yoshimura (yellow card) 49'	Stadium: Júbilo Iwata Stadium; Attendance: 11,897; Referee: Tetsu Karakida

8 September 2001 4	Tokyo Verdy	1–2 (a.e.t.)	Júbilo Iwata	Tokyo
19:00 JST (UTC+09)	Hayama (yellow card) 44'; Yoneyama (yellow card) 48'; Yamada 53'; Emerson (yellow card) 57'; Kikuchi (yellow card) 70'	Report	Nakayama 2' 96'; Fukunishi (yellow card) 14'; Maeda (yellow card) 90'	Stadium: Tokyo Stadium; Attendance: 24,024; Referee: Leslie Mottram (Scotland)

15 September 2001 5	Júbilo Iwata	2–1 (a.e.t.)	Urawa Red Diamonds	Iwata, Shizuoka
14:04 JST (UTC+09)	Tanaka (yellow card) 9'; Fujita 21' 96'	Report	Michiki (yellow card) 28'; Yamada (yellow card) 41' (yellow-red card) 73'; Emerson Sheik 53'; Jojo (yellow card) 77'; Tuto (yellow card) 94'	Stadium: Júbilo Iwata Stadium; Attendance: 15,043; Referee: Kazuhiko Matsumura

22 September 2001 6	Nagoya Grampus Eight	0–2	Júbilo Iwata	Toyota
15:33 JST (UTC+09)	Nishizawa (yellow card) 18'; Yamaguchi (yellow card) 23'; Nakamura (yellow card) 65'	Report	Oku (yellow card) 25'; Fujita 35'; Maeda 89'	Stadium: Toyota Stadium; Attendance: 32,849; Referee: Shinichiro Obata

29 September 2001 7	Cerezo Osaka	0–1	Júbilo Iwata	Osaka
19:04 JST (UTC+09)	Saito (yellow card) 38'; Kurata (yellow card) 46' (yellow-red card) 57'; Yoon Jong-hwan (yellow card) 66'	Report	Fujita 40'; Fukunishi (yellow card) 62'	Stadium: Nagai Stadium; Attendance: 18,023; Referee: Hideaki Harada

13 October 2001 8	Júbilo Iwata	2–0	Kashima Antlers	Fukuroi, Shizuoka
14:02 JST (UTC+09)	Oku (yellow card) 14'; Nakayama 58'; Fujita 78'	Report	Bismarck (yellow card) 79'	Stadium: Shizuoka Stadium; Attendance: 28,255; Referee: Lim Kee Chong (Mauritius)

17 October 2001 9	FC Tokyo	2–5	Júbilo Iwata	Tokyo
19:00 JST (UTC+09)	Asari (yellow card) 26'; Miura 54'; Kagami 79'	Report	Kanazawa 64'; Shimizu 72', 81', 85'; Nakayama 86'	Stadium: National Stadium; Attendance: 22,734; Referee: Kiyoshi Ota

20 October 2001 10	Consadole Sapporo	1–2	Júbilo Iwata	Sapporo
14:04 JST (UTC+09)	Biju 89'	Report	Nakayama 44'; Kanazawa 76'; Kawamura (yellow card) 89'	Stadium: Atsubetsu Stadium; Attendance: 18,917; Referee: Takeshi Okada

31 October 2001 11	Júbilo Iwata	1–3	Kashiwa Reysol	Iwata, Shizuoka
19:04 JST (UTC+09)	Shimizu 31'; Fukunishi (yellow card) 60'; Oku (yellow card) 62'	Report	T. Watanabe 63'; M. Watanabe 74'; Sunakawa 82'; Sugiyama (yellow card) 86'	Stadium: Júbilo Iwata Stadium; Attendance: 9,289; Referee: Lim Kee Chong (Mauritius)

3 November 2001 12	Avispa Fukuoka	2–3 (a.e.t.)	Júbilo Iwata	Fukuoka
14:03 JST (UTC+09)	Hattori 20'; Noh Jung-yoon 32'; Kawaguchi (yellow card) 51' (red card) 73'; Miyoshi (yellow card) 84'	Report	Shimizu 15'; Oku (yellow card) 22'; Nishi (yellow card) 52'; Hattori 74'; H. Suzuki (yellow card) 85' (yellow-red card) 89'; Oiwa 98'; Nakayama 104'	Stadium: Hakatanomori Football Stadium; Attendance: 17,002; Referee: Kazuhiko Matsumura

10 November 2001 13	Júbilo Iwata	1–0 (a.e.t.)	Yokohama F. Marinos	Iwata, Shizuoka
14:03 JST (UTC+09)	Yamanishi (yellow card) 60'; Nakayama 94'	Report	Sakata (yellow card) 7'; Omura (yellow card) 14'; Koga (yellow card) 89'	Stadium: Júbilo Iwata Stadium; Attendance: 15,253; Referee: Hiroyuki Umemoto

17 November 2001 14	Júbilo Iwata	1–0	Sanfrecce Hiroshima	Iwata, Shizuoka
15:03 JST (UTC+09)	Fukunishi 66'	Report	K. Uemura (yellow card) 19'; Pashinin (yellow card) 33'; Kubo (yellow card) 74'; Morisaki (yellow card) 80'	Stadium: Júbilo Iwata Stadium; Attendance: 11,998; Referee: Kiyoshi Ota

24 November 2001 15	JEF United Ichihara	2–4	Júbilo Iwata	Ichihara
14:00 JST (UTC+09)	Hayashi 11', 48'; Milinovič (yellow card) 21'; Chano (yellow card) 40'; Mujčin (yellow card) 40' (yellow-red card) 51'; Nakanishi (yellow card) 52'	Report	Fujita (yellow card) 3' (goal) 41'; Oku 32'; Fukunishi (yellow card) 54' (goal) 74'; Živković (yellow card) 65'; Nakayama 89'	Stadium: Ichihara Stadium; Attendance: 11,449; Referee: Kim Young-joo (South Korea)

==== Suntory Championship ====
2 December 2001 1st Leg	Júbilo Iwata	2–2	Kashima Antlers	Fukuroi, Shizuoka
15:01	Hattori 11' (pen.); Fukunishi (yellow card) 16'; Nakayama 54'; Fujita (yellow card) 82'	Report; Highlights	Bismarck (yellow card) 6'; Fabiano (yellow card) 10'; T. Suzuki (yellow card) 30' (yellow-red card) 37'; Akita 79'; Hirase 83'	Stadium: Shizuoka Stadium; Attendance: 32,368; Referee: Masayoshi Okada

8 December 2001 2nd Leg	Kashima Antlers	1–0 (a.e.t.) (3–2 agg.)	Júbilo Iwata	Kashima
19:34	Kumagai (yellow card) 79'; Ogasawara (yellow card) 85' 100'	Report; Highlights	Nishi (yellow card) 99'	Stadium: Kashima Soccer Stadium; Attendance: 40,115; Referee: Leslie Mottram (Scotland)

=== Emperor's Cup ===
Júbilo Iwata was granted a Bye on the first and second rounds.

12 December 2001 Thrd Round	Júbilo Iwata	3–2 (a.e.t.)	Komazawa University	Iwata
JST (UTC+09)	Maeda 53'; Nishi 60'; Fujita 113' (pen.)	Report	Fukai 65', 90'	Stadium: Júbilo Iwata Stadium; Attendance: 3,533

16 December 2001 Fourth Round	Júbilo Iwata	1–3	Tokyo Verdy	Kumamoto
JST (UTC+09)	Oiwa 45'	Report	Edmundo 24', 28'; Yoneyama 51'	Stadium: Kumamoto Athletics Stadium; Attendance: 9,155

=== J.League Cup ===
4 April 2001 1st Round, Leg 1	Júbilo Iwata	2–2	Cerezo Osaka	Iwata
19:00 JST (UTC+09)	Fukunishi (yellow card) 35'; Suzuki (yellow card) 70'; Takahara 77', 80'	Report	Ōkubo 6' (yellow card) 83'; Saito (yellow card) 31'; Shimizu (yellow card) 40'; Kurata (yellow card) 78'; Kim Do-keun (yellow card) 78'; Manaka 89'	Stadium: Júbilo Iwata Stadium; Attendance: 6,536; Referee: Kazuhisa Osada

18 April 2001 1st Round, Leg 2	Cerezo Osaka	1–2 (3–4 agg.)	Júbilo Iwata	Osaka
19:00 JST (UTC+09)	Saito (yellow card) 15'; Yoon Jong-hwan (yellow card) 44'; Manaka (yellow card) 67'; Kim Do-keun (yellow card) 70'; Manaka 89'	Report	Suzuki (yellow card) 44'; Hattori (yellow card) 71'; Oiwa (yellow card) 84'; Živković 87'; Nakayama 89'	Stadium: Nagai Stadium; Attendance: 7,136; Referee: Toshimitsu Yoshida

13 June 2001 2nd Round, Leg 1	Júbilo Iwata	1–0	Oita Trinita	Iwata
19:00 JST (UTC+09)	Shimizu 17'; Oiwa (yellow card) 89'	Report	Kawasaki (yellow card) 61' (yellow-red card) 65'	Stadium: Júbilo Iwata Stadium; Attendance: 6,770; Referee: Hiroyuki Umemoto

20 June 2001 2nd Round, Leg 2	Oita Trinita	1–1 (1–2 agg.)	Júbilo Iwata	Kumamoto
19:02 JST (UTC+09)	Takamatsu 9'; Ikehata (yellow card) 11'; Miki (yellow card) 31'; Kaji (yellow card) 64'	Report	Fukunishi (yellow card) 12'; Živković (yellow card) 51'; Nakayama 66'	Stadium: Kumamoto Athletics Stadium; Attendance: 9,741; Referee: Hideaki Harada

8 August 2001 Quarter-finals, Leg 1	Júbilo Iwata	2–2	JEF United Ichihara	Kagoshima
19:06 JST (UTC+09)	Nanami (yellow card) 11'; Nakayama 36', 80' (yellow card) 59'; Suzuki (yellow card) 48'; Maeda (yellow card) 84'	Report	Choi Yong-soo 68', 76' (yellow card) 82'; Hasebe (yellow card) 83'	Stadium: Kagoshima Kamoike Stadium; Attendance: 11,038; Referee: Dick Jol (Netherlands)

28 August 2001 Quarter-finals, Leg 2	JEF United Ichihara	0–2 (2–4 agg.)	Júbilo Iwata	Ichihara
19:00 JST (UTC+09)	Choi Yong-soo (yellow card) 63'; Abe (yellow card) 65'	Report	Fukunishi (yellow card) 64'; Nishi (yellow card) 67'; Kawaguchi 80' (yellow card) 87'; Maeda 85'	Stadium: Ichihara Stadium; Attendance: 4,809; Referee: Tetsuya Hamana

26 September 2001 Semi-finals, Leg 1	Júbilo Iwata	1–0	Kashima Antlers	Iwata
19:05 JST (UTC+09)	Shimizu 54'; Oku (yellow card) 76'	Report	Kumagai (yellow card) 13' (yellow-red card) 89'; Fabiano (yellow card) 55'; Akita (yellow card) 80'; Motoyama (yellow card) 89'	Stadium: Júbilo Iwata Stadium; Attendance: 8,547; Referee: Wolfgang Stark (Germany)

10 October 2001 Semi-finals, Leg 2	Kashima Antlers	0–0 (0–1 agg.)	Júbilo Iwata	Kashima
19:04 JST (UTC+09)	Narahashi (yellow card) 13'; Augusto (red card) 44'; Ogasawara (yellow card) 64'; Hasegawa (yellow card) 84'	Report	Fujita (yellow card) 12'; Fukunishi (yellow card) 47'; Oku (yellow card) 58'; Kawamura (yellow card) 80'	Stadium: Kashima Soccer Stadium; Attendance: 7,367; Referee: Toru Kamikawa

27 October 2001 Final	Júbilo Iwata	0–0 (a.e.t.) (1–3 p)	Yokohama F. Marinos	Tokyo
14:00 JST (UTC+09)	Oiwa (yellow card) 92'	Report	Omura (yellow card) 25'; Nagayama (yellow card) 45' (yellow-red card) 86'; Nakamura (yellow card) 61'; Jo (yellow card) 96'; Matsuda (yellow card) 118'	Stadium: National Stadium; Attendance: 31,019; Referee: Leslie Mottram (Scotland)
	Penalties
	Fujita (penalty missed); Nakayama (penalty scored); Živković (penalty missed); Maeda (penalty missed)		(penalty scored) Nakamura; (penalty scored) Sakata; (penalty missed) Hato; (penalty missed) Dutra; (penalty scored) Omura

== International results ==
=== Asian Club Championship ===
Júbilo Iwata qualified for this tournament as winners of the 1999 season.

Second round

10 September 2000 1st Leg	South China (Hong Kong)	1–3	(Japan) Júbilo Iwata	Hong Kong
		Report		Stadium: Happy Valley Racecourse

16 September 2000 2nd Leg	Júbilo Iwata (Japan)	3–1 (6–2 agg.)	(Hong Kong) South China	Iwata, Japan
		Report		Stadium: Júbilo Iwata Stadium

Quarter-finals

Pos	Team	Pld	W	D	L	GF	GA	GD	Pts	Qualification
1	(Japan) Júbilo Iwata	3	3	0	0	12	2	+10	9	Advance to knockout stage
2	(South Korea) Suwon Samsung Bluewings	3	2	0	1	14	4	+10	6	Advance to knockout stage
3	(China) Shandong Luneng Taishan	3	1	0	2	5	13	−8	3	
4	(Indonesia) PSM Makassar (H)	3	0	0	3	2	14	−12	0	

(H) Hosts

21 March 2001 1	Suwon Samsung Bluewings (South Korea)	0–3	(Japan) Júbilo Iwata	Makassar, Indonesia
		Report	Fujita 14'; Yang Jong-hu 77' (o.g.); Nakayama 90'	Stadium: Andi Mattalata Stadium

23 March 2001 2	Júbilo Iwata (Japan)	6–2	(China) Shandong Luneng Taishan	Makassar, Indonesia
	Fujita 29' (pen.); Nakayama 42', 43', 56'; Živković 66' (pen.); Oku 78'	Report	Delvalle 34'; Li 90'	Stadium: Andi Mattalata Stadium

25 March 2001 3	PSM Makassar (Indonesia)	0–3	(Japan) Júbilo Iwata	Makassar, Indonesia
		Report	Naruo 37'; Seino 56'; Yamanishi 74'	Stadium: Andi Mattalata Stadium

Final Four

24 May 2001 Semi-finals	Júbilo Iwata (Japan)	1–0 (a.e.t.)	(Kazakhstan) Irtysh Pavlodar	Suwon, South Korea
	Kanazawa 103'	Report		Stadium: Suwon World Cup Stadium

26 May 2001 Final	Suwon Samsung Bluewings (South Korea)	1–0	(Japan) Júbilo Iwata	Suwon, South Korea
	Sandro 15'	Report		Stadium: Suwon World Cup Stadium

=== FIFA Club World Championship ===
As winners of the 1999 Asian Super Cup, Júbilo Iwata was one of the 12 teams that were invited to the 2001 FIFA Club World Championship, which would be hosted in Spain from 28 July to 12 August 2001. However, the tournament was cancelled, primarily due to the collapse of ISL, which was marketing partner of FIFA at the time.

31 July 2001 1	Real Madrid (Spain)	Cancelled	(Japan) Júbilo Iwata	Madrid, Spain
				Stadium: Santiago Bernabéu

3 August 2001 2	Júbilo Iwata (Japan)	Cancelled	(Ghana) Hearts of Oak	Madrid, Spain
				Stadium: Santiago Bernabéu

6 August 2001 3	Los Angeles Galaxy (United States)	Cancelled	(Japan) Júbilo Iwata	Madrid, Spain
				Stadium: Vicente Calderón

== Player statistics ==
No.	Pos.	Nat.	Player	D.o.B. (Age)	Height / Weight	J.League 1		Emperor's Cup		J.League Cup		Total	
No.	Pos.	Nat.	Player	D.o.B. (Age)	Height / Weight	Apps	Goals	Apps	Goals	Apps	Goals	Apps	Goals
1	GK	(Netherlands)	Arno van Zwam	September 16, 1969 (aged 31)	cm / kg	26	0						
2	DF	(Japan)	Hideto Suzuki	October 7, 1974 (aged 26)	cm / kg	27	0						
3	DF	(Japan)	Go Oiwa	June 23, 1972 (aged 28)	cm / kg	28	2						
4	MF	(Japan)	Naoya Saeki	December 18, 1977 (aged 23)	cm / kg	1	0						
5	DF	(Japan)	Makoto Tanaka	August 8, 1975 (aged 25)	cm / kg	24	1						
6	MF	(Japan)	Toshihiro Hattori	September 23, 1973 (aged 27)	cm / kg	27	5						
7	MF	(Japan)	Hiroshi Nanami	November 28, 1972 (aged 28)	cm / kg	17	1						
8	MF	(Japan)	Daisuke Oku	February 7, 1976 (aged 25)	cm / kg	25	4						
9	FW	(Japan)	Masashi Nakayama	September 23, 1967 (aged 33)	cm / kg	30	16						
10	MF	(Japan)	Toshiya Fujita	October 4, 1971 (aged 29)	cm / kg	26	11						
11	MF	(Japan)	Norihiro Nishi	May 9, 1980 (aged 20)	cm / kg	22	2						
12	GK	(Japan)	Tomoaki Ōgami	June 7, 1970 (aged 30)	cm / kg	3	0						
13	FW	(Japan)	Nobuo Kawaguchi	April 10, 1975 (aged 25)	cm / kg	23	0						
14	DF	(Japan)	Takahiro Yamanishi	April 2, 1976 (aged 24)	cm / kg	13	0						
15	MF	(Federal Republic of Yugoslavia)	Aleksandar Živković	July 28, 1977 (aged 23)	cm / kg	13	0						
16	GK	(Japan)	Daisuke Matsushita	October 31, 1981 (aged 19)	cm / kg	0	0						
17	DF	(Japan)	Tsutomu Kitade	September 18, 1978 (aged 22)	cm / kg	0	0						
18	FW	(Japan)	Norihisa Shimizu	October 4, 1976 (aged 24)	cm / kg	16	5						
19	FW	(Japan)	Naohiro Takahara	June 4, 1979 (aged 21)	cm / kg	13	8						
20	DF	(Japan)	Jo Kanazawa	July 9, 1976 (aged 24)	cm / kg	19	2						
21	GK	(Japan)	Hiromasa Yamamoto	June 5, 1979 (aged 21)	cm / kg	2	0						
22	MF	(Japan)	Takahiro Kawamura	October 4, 1979 (aged 21)	cm / kg	6	0						
23	MF	(Japan)	Takashi Fukunishi	September 1, 1976 (aged 24)	cm / kg	29	4						
24	FW	(Japan)	Ryoichi Maeda	October 9, 1981 (aged 19)	cm / kg	9	2						
25	DF	(Japan)	Taikai Uemoto	June 1, 1982 (aged 18)	cm / kg	0	0						
26	DF	(Japan)	Yasumasa Nishino	September 14, 1982 (aged 18)	cm / kg	0	0						
27	FW	(Japan)	Tomoaki Seino	September 29, 1981 (aged 19)	cm / kg	2	0						
28	MF	(Japan)	Shingo Kumabayashi	June 23, 1981 (aged 19)	cm / kg	0	0						
29	MF	(Japan)	Takashi Hirano	July 15, 1974 (aged 26)	cm / kg	3	0						
30	FW	(Japan)	Naoki Naruo	October 5, 1974 (aged 26)	cm / kg	0	0						
