= 2004 Júbilo Iwata season =

Júbilo Iwata
2004 season
- Manager: Takashi Kuwahara; Masakazu Suzuki; Masakuni Yamamoto
- Stadium: Yamaha Stadium
- J. League 1: 5th
- Emperor's Cup: Runners-up
- J. League Cup: GL-B 4th
- Top goalscorer: Gral (16)
Home colours	Away colours

During the 2004 season, Júbilo Iwata competed in the J. League 1, in which they finished 5th.

== Competitions ==
Competitions	Position
J. League 1	5th / 16 clubs
Emperor's Cup	Runners-up
J. League Cup	GL-B 4th / 4 clubs

== Domestic results ==
=== J. League 1 ===
Match	Date	Venue	Opponents	Score
1-1	2004.3.13	Yamaha Stadium	Tokyo Verdy 1969	2-0
1-2	2004.3.20	Toyota Stadium	Nagoya Grampus Eight	1-3
1-3	2004.4.3	Yamaha Stadium	Urawa Red Diamonds	3-1
1-4	2004.4.10	Nagai Stadium	Cerezo Osaka	1-2
1-5	2004.4.14	Hitachi Kashiwa Soccer Stadium	Kashiwa Reysol	1-3
1-6	2004.4.17	Yamaha Stadium	FC Tokyo	2-0
1-7	2004.5.2	Shizuoka Stadium	Shimizu S-Pulse	1-0
1-8	2004.5.5	Yamaha Stadium	Oita Trinita	2-1
1-9	2004.5.9	Osaka Expo '70 Stadium	Gamba Osaka	0-2
1-10	2004.5.15	Shizuoka Stadium	Yokohama F. Marinos	1-2
1-11	2004.5.23	Niigata Stadium	Albirex Niigata	1-2
1-12	2004.6.12	Yamaha Stadium	JEF United Ichihara	3-2
1-13	2004.6.16	Yamaha Stadium	Vissel Kobe	2-2
1-14	2004.6.19	Kashima Soccer Stadium	Kashima Antlers	1-0
1-15	2004.6.26	Yamaha Stadium	Sanfrecce Hiroshima	4-2
2-1	2004.8.14	Oita Stadium	Oita Trinita	1-1
2-2	2004.8.21	Yamaha Stadium	Nagoya Grampus Eight	1-2
2-3	2004.8.29	Saitama Stadium 2002	Urawa Red Diamonds	3-2
2-4	2004.9.11	National Stadium	Yokohama F. Marinos	3-0
2-5	2004.9.18	Shizuoka Stadium	Kashima Antlers	4-4
2-6	2004.9.23	Yamaha Stadium	Kashiwa Reysol	1-1
2-7	2004.9.26	Kobe Wing Stadium	Vissel Kobe	1-2
2-8	2004.10.2	Shizuoka Stadium	Shimizu S-Pulse	1-2
2-9	2004.10.17	National Stadium	FC Tokyo	0-0
2-10	2004.10.24	Yamaha Stadium	Albirex Niigata	3-1
2-11	2004.10.30	Ajinomoto Stadium	Tokyo Verdy 1969	1-2
2-12	2004.11.7	Yamaha Stadium	Cerezo Osaka	2-2
2-13	2004.11.20	Hiroshima Big Arch	Sanfrecce Hiroshima	3-2
2-14	2004.11.23	Yamaha Stadium	Gamba Osaka	1-2
2-15	2004.11.28	Ichihara Seaside Stadium	JEF United Ichihara	2-1

=== Emperor's Cup ===
Match	Date	Venue	Opponents	Score
4th Round	2004.11.13	Ajinomoto Stadium	Sagawa Express Tokyo SC	2-3
5th Round	2004.12.12	Yamaha Stadium	Gunma Horikoshi	2-1
Quarterfinals	2004.12.19	Kagawa Marugame Stadium	Consadole Sapporo	0-1 a.e.t. (sudden death)
Semifinals	2004.12.25	National Stadium	Urawa Red Diamonds	2-1
Final	2005.1.1	National Stadium	Tokyo Verdy 1969	2-1

=== J. League Cup ===
Match	Date	Venue	Opponents	Score
GL-B-1	2004.3.27	Yamaha Stadium	Albirex Niigata	0-0
GL-B-2	2004.4.29	Mizuho Athletic Stadium	Nagoya Grampus Eight	5-2
GL-B-3	2004.5.29	Yamaha Stadium	Gamba Osaka	0-1
GL-B-4	2004.6.5	Osaka Expo '70 Stadium	Gamba Osaka	2-3
GL-B-5	2004.7.17	Niigata Stadium	Albirex Niigata	1-1
GL-B-6	2004.7.24	Kagoshima Kamoike Stadium	Nagoya Grampus Eight	1-1

== Player statistics ==
No.	Pos.	Player	D.o.B. (Age)	Height / Weight	J. League 1		Emperor's Cup		J. League Cup		Total	
No.	Pos.	Player	D.o.B. (Age)	Height / Weight	Apps	Goals	Apps	Goals	Apps	Goals	Apps	Goals
1	GK	Yohei Sato	November 22, 1972 (aged 31)	cm / kg	23	0						
2	DF	Hideto Suzuki	October 7, 1974 (aged 29)	cm / kg	28	1						
3	DF	Taikai Uemoto	June 1, 1982 (aged 21)	cm / kg	0	0						
4	MF	Takahiro Kawamura	October 4, 1979 (aged 24)	cm / kg	21	1						
5	DF	Makoto Tanaka	August 8, 1975 (aged 28)	cm / kg	28	1						
6	MF	Toshihiro Hattori	September 23, 1973 (aged 30)	cm / kg	29	0						
7	MF	Hiroshi Nanami	November 28, 1972 (aged 31)	cm / kg	29	3						
8	FW	Rodrigo Gral	February 21, 1977 (aged 27)	cm / kg	26	16						
9	FW	Masashi Nakayama	September 23, 1967 (aged 36)	cm / kg	19	3						
10	MF	Toshiya Fujita	October 4, 1971 (aged 32)	cm / kg	29	7						
11	MF	Norihiro Nishi	May 9, 1980 (aged 23)	cm / kg	17	4						
12	GK	Hiromasa Yamamoto	June 5, 1979 (aged 24)	cm / kg	0	0						
12	GK	Fumiya Iwamaru	December 4, 1981 (aged 22)	cm / kg	7	0						
13	FW	Nobuo Kawaguchi	April 10, 1975 (aged 28)	cm / kg	8	0						
14	DF	Takahiro Yamanishi	April 2, 1976 (aged 27)	cm / kg	18	0						
15	MF	Hitoshi Morishita	September 21, 1972 (aged 31)	cm / kg	9	0						
16	GK	Toshiyasu Takahara	October 18, 1980 (aged 23)	cm / kg	0	0						
17	MF	Yoshiaki Ota	June 11, 1983 (aged 20)	cm / kg	7	1						
18	FW	Ryoichi Maeda	October 9, 1981 (aged 22)	cm / kg	27	8						
19	MF	Sho Naruoka	May 31, 1984 (aged 19)	cm / kg	20	1						
20	DF	Kentaro Ohi	May 14, 1984 (aged 19)	cm / kg	3	0						
21	GK	Kenya Matsui	September 10, 1985 (aged 18)	cm / kg	1	0						
22	FW	Robert Cullen	June 7, 1985 (aged 18)	cm / kg	9	0						
23	MF	Takashi Fukunishi	September 1, 1976 (aged 27)	cm / kg	26	6						
24	DF	Kohei Matsushita	July 24, 1985 (aged 18)	cm / kg	0	0						
25	DF	Kenichi Kaga	September 30, 1983 (aged 20)	cm / kg	0	0						
26	DF	Yasumasa Nishino	September 14, 1982 (aged 21)	cm / kg	9	1						
27	MF	Naoya Kikuchi	November 24, 1984 (aged 19)	cm / kg	18	1						
28	MF	Keisuke Funatani	January 7, 1986 (aged 18)	cm / kg	0	0						
29	MF	Gavião	February 2, 1980 (aged 24)	cm / kg	1	0						

== Other pages ==
- (in Japanese) J. League official site
