= Deives Thiago =

Brazilian footballer (born 1982)

Personal information
- Full name: Deives Thiago Santos da Silva
- Date of birth: April 1, 1982 (age 44)
- Place of birth: Porto Alegre, Brazil
- Height: 1.76 m (5 ft 9 in)
- Position: Midfielder

Team information
- Current team: Noroeste

Senior career*
Years	Team	Apps	(Gls)
2003	Júbilo Iwata		
2003	São José-PA		
2004	Grêmio		
2006	Canoas		
2007	Esportivo		
2008	Guarany de Bagé		
2008	Ceará		
2009	Trindade		
2009	Cerâmica		
2010	Inter-SM		
2010	Cianorte		
2011	Luverdense	4	(1)
2011–	Avenida		
2013	Noroeste		
- * Club domestic league appearances and goals

Deives Thiago Santos da Silva (born April 1, 1982) is a Brazilian football player, currently plays in Noroeste.

== Career ==
Deives Thiago played for Grêmio in the 2004 Campeonato Brasileiro Série A.

== Club statistics ==
Club performance			League		Cup		League Cup		Total	
Season	Club	League	Apps	Goals	Apps	Goals	Apps	Goals	Apps	Goals
Japan			League		Emperor's Cup		J.League Cup		Total	
2003	Júbilo Iwata	J1 League	0	0	1	0	0	0	1	0
Total			0	0	1	0	0	0	1	0
