= Takuya Hara (footballer) =

Japanese footballer

Takuya Hara 原 拓也
Personal information
- Full name: Takuya Hara
- Date of birth: June 4, 1983 (age 43)
- Place of birth: Fukuoka, Japan
- Height: 1.75 m (5 ft 9 in)
- Position: Forward

Youth career
- 1999–2001: Chikuyo High School

Senior career*
Years	Team	Apps	(Gls)
2002–2003	Júbilo Iwata	0	(0)
2004	Shonan Bellmare	6	(0)
2005	Shizuoka FC		
Total		6	(0)
Medal record
Júbilo Iwata
Winner	J1 League	2002
Runner-up	J1 League	2003
Winner	Emperor's Cup	2003
- * Club domestic league appearances and goals

Takuya Hara (原 拓也, Hara Takuya; born June 4, 1983) is a former Japanese football player.

== Playing career ==
Hara was born in Fukuoka Prefecture on June 4, 1983. After graduating from high school, he joined the J1 League club Júbilo Iwata in 2002. However he did not play in any matches. In 2004, he moved to the J2 League club Shonan Bellmare with teammate Yuya Hikichi. Although he played several matches as forward, he moved to the Regional Leagues club Shizuoka FC in 2005. He retired at the end of the 2005 season.

== Career statistics ==
Appearances and goals by club, season and competition
Club	Season	League			Emperor's Cup		J.League Cup		Total	
Club	Season	Division	Apps	Goals	Apps	Goals	Apps	Goals	Apps	Goals
Júbilo Iwata	2002	J1 League	0	0	0	0	0	0	0	0
Júbilo Iwata	2003	J1 League	0	0	0	0	0	0	0	0
Shonan Bellmare	2004	J2 League	6	0			—		6	0
Career total			6	0	0	0	0	0	6	0
