= Yuya Hikichi =

Japanese footballer

Yuya Hikichi 挽地 祐哉
Personal information
- Full name: Yuya Hikichi
- Date of birth: May 2, 1983 (age 43)
- Place of birth: Kagoshima, Kagoshima, Japan
- Height: 1.81 m (5 ft 11 1/2 in)
- Position: Midfielder

Youth career
- 1999–2001: Kagoshima Josei High School

Senior career*
Years	Team	Apps	(Gls)
2002–2003	Júbilo Iwata	0	(0)
2004	Shonan Bellmare	6	(0)
2005–2010	Tokushima Vortis	121	(2)
2010	Zweigen Kanazawa	9	(0)
Total		136	(2)
Medal record
Júbilo Iwata
Winner	J1 League	2002
Runner-up	J1 League	2003
Winner	Emperor's Cup	2003
- * Club domestic league appearances and goals

Yuya Hikichi (挽地 祐哉, Hikichi Yūya; born May 2, 1983) is a former Japanese football player.

== Playing career ==
Hikichi was born in Kagoshima on May 2, 1983. After graduating from high school, he joined the J1 League club Júbilo Iwata with teammate Yuya Funatsu in 2002. However he did not play in any matches. In 2004, he moved to the J2 League club Shonan Bellmare with teammate Takuya Hara. He played several matches as defensive midfielder and right side back. In 2005, he moved to the newly promoted J2 League club, Tokushima Vortis. He played many matches as center back in 2005. In 2006, he became a regular player as defensive midfielder. However he did not play much in 2008. In August 2010, he moved to the Japan Football League club Zweigen Kanazawa. He retired at the end of the 2010 season.

== Career statistics ==
Appearances and goals by club, season and competition
Club	Season	League			Emperor's Cup		J.League Cup		Total	
Club	Season	Division	Apps	Goals	Apps	Goals	Apps	Goals	Apps	Goals
Júbilo Iwata	2002	J1 League	0	0	0	0	0	0	0	0
Júbilo Iwata	2003	J1 League	0	0	0	0	0	0	0	0
Shonan Bellmare	2004	J2 League	6	0	0	0	-		6	0
Tokushima Vortis	2005	J2 League	19	0	1	0	-		20	0
Tokushima Vortis	2006	J2 League	38	1	1	0	-		39	1
Tokushima Vortis	2007	J2 League	40	0	2	0	-		42	0
Tokushima Vortis	2008	J2 League	9	0	1	0	-		10	0
Tokushima Vortis	2009	J2 League	15	1	1	0	-		16	1
Tokushima Vortis	2010	J2 League	0	0	0	0	-		0	0
Zweigen Kanazawa	2011	Football League	9	0	2	0	-		11	0
Career total			136	2	8	0	0	0	144	2
