= 1998 J.League Cup final =

Júbilo Iwata	JEF United Ichihara
4	0
- Date: July 19, 1998
- Venue: National Stadium, Tokyo

1998 J.League Cup final was the 6th final of the J.League Cup competition. The final was played at National Stadium in Tokyo on July 19, 1998. Júbilo Iwata won the championship.

== Match details ==
July 19, 1998

Júbilo Iwata	4–0	JEF United Ichihara
Nobuo Kawaguchi 51', 80'; Daisuke Oku 72'; Naohiro Takahara 87'	Report

National Stadium

Júbilo Iwata
GK	12	(Japan) Tomoaki Ogami
DF	28	(Japan) Takuma Koga
DF	5	(Japan) Makoto Tanaka
DF	14	(Japan) Takahiro Yamanishi
DF	4	(Brazil) Adilson
MF	7	(Japan) Hiroshi Nanami
MF	29	(Japan) Daisuke Oku
MF	10	(Japan) Toshiya Fujita
MF	6	(Japan) Toshihiro Hattori
FW	13	(Japan) Nobuo Kawaguchi
FW	19	(Japan) Naohiro Takahara
Substitutes:
GK	1	(Japan) Yushi Ozaki
DF	3	(Japan) Masahiro Endo
MF	18	(Japan) Norihisa Shimizu
MF	23	(Japan) Takashi Fukunishi
MF	20	(Japan) Kiyokazu Kudo
Manager:
(Brazil) Valmir

JEF United Ichihara
GK	1	(Japan) Kenichi Shimokawa
DF	2	(Japan) Eisuke Nakanishi
DF	3	(Japan) Shinichi Muto	(substituted off) 81'
DF	5	(Japan) Satoshi Yamaguchi
DF	30	(Australia) Bingley
MF	11	(Japan) Atsuhiko Ejiri	(substituted off) 81'
MF	10	(Federal Republic of Yugoslavia) Maslovar
MF	8	(Japan) Yoshikazu Nonomura
MF	4	(Netherlands) Scholten
FW	9	(Japan) Nobuhiro Takeda
FW	16	(Japan) Nozomi Hiroyama
Substitutes:
GK	21	(Japan) Atsushi Shirai
DF	18	(Japan) Katsushi Kurihara
DF	15	(Japan) Takayuki Chano
MF	6	(Japan) Tomoyuki Sakai	(substituted on) 81'
FW	19	(Japan) Naoki Matsushita	(substituted on) 81'
Manager:
(Netherlands) Versleijen

== See also ==
- 1998 J.League Cup
