= Aleksandar Živković (footballer, born 1977) =

Serbian footballer

Personal information
- Date of birth: 28 July 1977 (age 49)
- Place of birth: Niš, SFR Yugoslavia
- Height: 1.78 m (5 ft 10 in)
- Position: Midfielder

Youth career
- Radnički Niš

Senior career*
Years	Team	Apps	(Gls)
1993–1994	Radnički Niš	9	(0)
1994–1995	Partizan	4	(0)
1995–1998	Radnički Niš	75	(6)
1998–2000	Rad	55	(10)
2000–2003	Júbilo Iwata	56	(7)
2004	Obilić	28	(2)
2005	OFK Beograd	13	(1)
2005	Voždovac	15	(1)
2006–2009	Shandong Luneng	98	(16)
2010	Shenzhen Ruby	28	(3)
2011	Guangzhou R&F	24	(3)
Total		404	(49)

International career
2001	FR Yugoslavia	2	(0)
2008	Serbia Olympic (O.P.)	3	(0)
- * Club domestic league appearances and goals

Aleksandar Živković (Serbian Cyrillic: Александар Живковић, pronounced [aleksǎːndar ʒǐːʋkoʋitɕ, alěksaːn-]; born 28 July 1977) is a Serbian retired footballer who played as a midfielder.

== Club career ==
Živković made his senior debuts at his hometown club Radnički Niš, aged 16, which attracted the attention of Partizan. He spent just one year with the Crno-beli, before returning to Čair in 1995. Over the next three seasons, Živković played regularly for the side, making 75 league appearances and scoring six goals. He was subsequently transferred to Belgrade club Rad in 1998. After two seasons with the Građevinari, Živković moved abroad to Japan and joined Júbilo Iwata in mid-2000. He helped the team win the Emperor's Cup in 2003.

In the 2004 winter transfer window, Živković returned to his homeland and signed for Obilić. He also played with OFK Beograd and Voždovac, before going abroad for the second time and joining Shandong Luneng in early 2006. Over the next four seasons, Živković helped the team win two Chinese Super League and one Chinese FA Cup. He also played for Shenzhen Ruby and Guangzhou R&F, before retiring from the game at the age of 34.

== International career ==
In 2001, Živković made two appearances for FR Yugoslavia at the Kirin Cup. He also represented Serbia at the 2008 Summer Olympics as one of the three over-age players alongside Miljan Mrdaković and Vladimir Stojković.

== Career statistics ==
Appearances and goals by club, season and competition
Club	Season	League		National cup		League cup		Total	
Club	Season	Apps	Goals	Apps	Goals	Apps	Goals	Apps	Goals
Júbilo Iwata	2000	11	2	1	0	3	0	15	2
Júbilo Iwata	2001	13	0	1	0	7	1	21	1
Júbilo Iwata	2002	10	2	3	0	5	1	18	3
Júbilo Iwata	2003	22	3	0	0	9	2	31	5
Career total		56	7	5	0	24	4	85	11

== Honours ==
Júbilo Iwata

- Emperor's Cup: 2003

Shandong Luneng

- Chinese Super League: 2006, 2008
- Chinese FA Cup: 2006
