= 2002 Júbilo Iwata season =

Júbilo Iwata
2002 season
- Manager: Masakazu Suzuki
- Stadium: Júbilo Iwata Stadium
- J. League 1: Champions
- Emperor's Cup: Quarterfinals
- J. League Cup: Quarterfinals
- Top goalscorer: Naohiro Takahara (26)
Home colours	Away colours

2002 Júbilo Iwata season

== Competitions ==
Competitions	Position
J. League 1	Champions / 16 clubs
Emperor's Cup	Quarterfinals
J. League Cup	Quarterfinals

== Domestic results ==
=== J. League 1 ===
Match	Date	Venue	Opponents	Score
1-1	2002.3.2	Shizuoka Stadium	Nagoya Grampus Eight	2-0
1-2	2002.3.10	Tokyo Stadium	Tokyo Verdy 1969	3-2
1-3	2002.3.17	Yamaha Stadium	Consadole Sapporo	4-0
1-4	2002.3.31	Yamaha Stadium	Kyoto Purple Sanga	3-1
1-5	2002.4.6	Kobe Universiade Memorial Stadium	Vissel Kobe	1-0 a.e.t. (sudden death)
1-6	2002.4.13	Shizuoka Stadium	Kashima Antlers	2-0
1-7	2002.4.20	Yamaha Stadium	Yokohama F. Marinos	1-3
1-8	2002.7.13	Saitama Stadium 2002	Urawa Red Diamonds	3-2 a.e.t. (sudden death)
1-9	2002.7.20	Tokyo Stadium	F.C. Tokyo	2-0
1-10	2002.7.24	Yamaha Stadium	Shimizu S-Pulse	3-1
1-11	2002.7.27	Ichihara Seaside Stadium	JEF United Ichihara	2-2 a.e.t.
1-12	2002.8.3	Yamaha Stadium	Gamba Osaka	5-4 a.e.t. (sudden death)
1-13	2002.8.7	Hiroshima Big Arch	Sanfrecce Hiroshima	1-0 a.e.t. (sudden death)
1-14	2002.8.10	Yamaha Stadium	Vegalta Sendai	4-0
1-15	2002.8.17	Kashiwa no Ha Park Stadium	Kashiwa Reysol	3-2
2-1	2002.8.31	Yamaha Stadium	Vissel Kobe	1-0
2-2	2002.9.7	Kashima Soccer Stadium	Kashima Antlers	2-1
2-3	2002.9.14	Yamaha Stadium	Urawa Red Diamonds	1-2
2-4	2002.9.18	Nihondaira Sports Stadium	Shimizu S-Pulse	2-0
2-5	2002.9.22	Yamaha Stadium	F.C. Tokyo	6-1
2-6	2002.9.29	Sapporo Dome	Consadole Sapporo	1-0 a.e.t. (sudden death)
2-7	2002.10.5	Osaka Expo '70 Stadium	Gamba Osaka	2-0
2-8	2002.10.12	Yamaha Stadium	JEF United Ichihara	1-2
2-9	2002.10.20	Miyagi Stadium	Vegalta Sendai	3-2 a.e.t. (sudden death)
2-10	2002.10.23	Yamaha Stadium	Sanfrecce Hiroshima	1-0
2-11	2002.10.26	National Olympic Stadium (Tokyo)	Yokohama F. Marinos	3-1
2-12	2002.11.10	Yamaha Stadium	Kashiwa Reysol	3-2 a.e.t. (sudden death)
2-13	2002.11.16	Nishikyogoku Athletic Stadium	Kyoto Purple Sanga	3-0
2-14	2002.11.23	Yamaha Stadium	Tokyo Verdy 1969	1-0 a.e.t. (sudden death)
2-15	2002.11.30	Toyota Stadium	Nagoya Grampus Eight	3-2

=== Emperor's Cup ===
Match	Date	Venue	Opponents	Score
3rd Round	2002..			-
4th Round	2002..			-
Quarterfinals	2002..			-

=== J. League Cup ===
Match	Date	Venue	Opponents	Score
GL-A-1	2002..			-
GL-A-2	2002..			-
GL-A-3	2002..			-
GL-A-4	2002..			-
GL-A-5	2002..			-
GL-A-6	2002..			-
Quarterfinals	2002..			-

== Player statistics ==
No.	Pos.	Player	D.o.B. (Age)	Height / Weight	J. League 1		Emperor's Cup		J. League Cup		Total	
No.	Pos.	Player	D.o.B. (Age)	Height / Weight	Apps	Goals	Apps	Goals	Apps	Goals	Apps	Goals
1	GK	Arno van Zwam	September 16, 1969 (aged 32)	cm / kg	16	0						
2	DF	Hideto Suzuki	October 7, 1974 (aged 27)	cm / kg	27	0						
3	DF	Go Oiwa	June 23, 1972 (aged 29)	cm / kg	20	0						
4	MF	Takahiro Kawamura	October 4, 1979 (aged 22)	cm / kg	16	0						
5	DF	Makoto Tanaka	August 8, 1975 (aged 26)	cm / kg	25	0						
6	MF	Toshihiro Hattori	September 23, 1973 (aged 28)	cm / kg	26	2						
7	MF	Hiroshi Nanami	November 28, 1972 (aged 29)	cm / kg	24	1						
8	FW	Rodrigo Gral	February 21, 1977 (aged 25)	cm / kg	9	1						
9	FW	Masashi Nakayama	September 23, 1967 (aged 34)	cm / kg	29	16						
10	MF	Toshiya Fujita	October 4, 1971 (aged 30)	cm / kg	30	10						
11	MF	Norihiro Nishi	May 9, 1980 (aged 21)	cm / kg	26	4						
12	GK	Hiromasa Yamamoto	June 5, 1979 (aged 22)	cm / kg	14	0						
13	FW	Nobuo Kawaguchi	April 10, 1975 (aged 26)	cm / kg	23	3						
14	DF	Takahiro Yamanishi	April 2, 1976 (aged 25)	cm / kg	24	1						
15	MF	Aleksandar Živković	July 28, 1977 (aged 24)	cm / kg	10	2						
16	GK	Daisuke Matsushita	October 31, 1981 (aged 20)	cm / kg	0	0						
17	DF	Tsutomu Kitade	September 18, 1978 (aged 23)	cm / kg	0	0						
18	FW	Ryoichi Maeda	October 9, 1981 (aged 20)	cm / kg	4	0						
19	FW	Naoki Naruo	October 5, 1974 (aged 27)	cm / kg	0	0						
20	DF	Jo Kanazawa	July 9, 1976 (aged 25)	cm / kg	22	1						
21	GK	Yuya Funatsu	November 22, 1983 (aged 18)	cm / kg	0	0						
22	MF	Kim Geun-Chol	June 24, 1983 (aged 18)	cm / kg	0	0						
23	MF	Takashi Fukunishi	September 1, 1976 (aged 25)	cm / kg	28	5						
24	FW	Takuya Hara	June 4, 1983 (aged 18)	cm / kg	0	0						
25	DF	Taikai Uemoto	June 1, 1982 (aged 19)	cm / kg	1	0						
26	DF	Yasumasa Nishino	September 14, 1982 (aged 19)	cm / kg	1	0						
27	FW	Tomoaki Seino	September 29, 1981 (aged 20)	cm / kg	0	0						
28	MF	Shingo Kumabayashi	June 23, 1981 (aged 20)	cm / kg	0	0						
29	MF	Yuya Hikichi	May 2, 1983 (aged 18)	cm / kg	0	0						
30	DF	Kenichi Kaga	September 30, 1983 (aged 18)	cm / kg	0	0						
31	MF	Yoshiaki Ota	June 11, 1983 (aged 18)	cm / kg	0	0						
32	FW	Naohiro Takahara	June 4, 1979 (aged 22)	cm / kg	27	26						

== Other pages ==
- (in Japanese) J. League official site
