= Arno van Zwam =

Dutch footballer

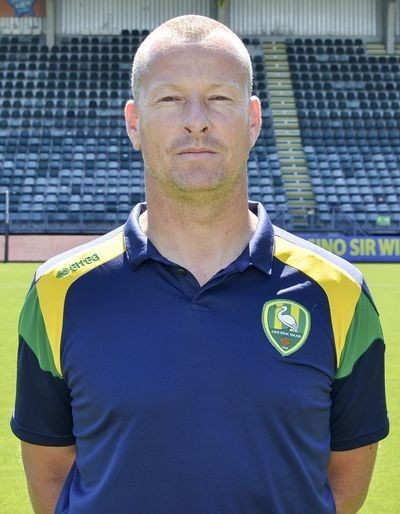

Personal information
- Full name: Arno van Zwam
- Date of birth: 16 September 1969 (age 57)
- Place of birth: Beneden-Leeuwen, Netherlands
- Position: Goalkeeper

Youth career
- Leones Beneden-Leeuwen
- Fortuna Sittard

Senior career*
Years	Team	Apps	(Gls)
1992–2000	Fortuna Sittard	200	(0)
2000–2003	Júbilo Iwata	74	(0)
2003–2007	NAC Breda	29	(0)
Total		303	(0)
- * Club domestic league appearances and goals

Arno van Zwam (born 16 September 1969) is a Dutch former professional footballer who played as a goalkeeper for several clubs, most notably Fortuna Sittard.

Van Zwam made his debut in professional football playing for the Fortuna Sittard squad in 1992. He also played for Júbilo Iwata in the J1 League between 2000 and 2003 before joining NAC Breda, ending his professional career in 2007.

== Club statistics ==
Club performance			League		Cup		League Cup		Total	
Season	Club	League	Apps	Goals	Apps	Goals	Apps	Goals	Apps	Goals
Netherlands			League		KNVB Cup		League Cup		Total	
1992/93	Fortuna Sittard	Eredivisie	0	0					0	0
1993/94	Fortuna Sittard	Eerste Divisie	0	0					0	0
1994/95	Fortuna Sittard	Eerste Divisie	34	0					34	0
1995/96	Fortuna Sittard	Eredivisie	33	0					33	0
1996/97	Fortuna Sittard	Eredivisie	34	0					34	0
1997/98	Fortuna Sittard	Eredivisie	34	0					34	0
1998/99	Fortuna Sittard	Eredivisie	31	0					31	0
1999/00	Fortuna Sittard	Eredivisie	34	0					34	0
Japan			League		Emperor's Cup		J.League Cup		Total	
2000	Júbilo Iwata	J1 League	15	0	3	0	4	0	22	0
2001	Júbilo Iwata	J1 League	26	0	2	0	8	0	36	0
2002	Júbilo Iwata	J1 League	16	0	0	0	5	0	21	0
2003	Júbilo Iwata	J1 League	17	0	0	0	5	0	22	0
Netherlands			League		KNVB Cup		League Cup		Total	
2003/04	NAC Breda	Eredivisie	7	0					7	0
2004/05	NAC Breda	Eredivisie	3	0					3	0
2005/06	NAC Breda	Eredivisie	17	0					17	0
2006/07	NAC Breda	Eredivisie	2	0					2	0
Country	Netherlands		229	0					229	0
Country	Japan		74	0	5	0	22	0	101	0
Total			303	0	5	0	22	0	330	0

== Honours ==
=== Team Honors ===
- J.League: 2002
- Japanese Super Cup: 2000

=== Individual Honors ===
- J.League Best XI: 2001
