= Tomoaki Seino =

Japanese footballer

Tomoaki Seino 清野 智秋
Personal information
- Full name: Tomoaki Seino
- Date of birth: 29 September 1981 (age 45)
- Place of birth: Agano, Niigata, Japan
- Height: 1.82 m (5 ft 11 1/2 in)
- Position: Forward

Youth career
- 1997–1999: Akita Commercial High School

Senior career*
Years	Team	Apps	(Gls)
2000–2002	Júbilo Iwata	2	(0)
2002–2003	Shizuoka FC		
2004–2006	Consadole Sapporo	75	(19)
2006–2008	Shizuoka FC		
2009	Convoy Sun Hei	11	(6)
Total		88	(25)
Medal record
Júbilo Iwata
Winner	J1 League	2002
Runner-up	J1 League	2001
Runner-up	J.League Cup	2001
- * Club domestic league appearances and goals

Tomoaki Seino (清野 智秋, Seino Tomoaki; born 29 September 1981) is a former Japanese football player.

== Playing career ==
Seino was born in Agano on 29 September 1981. After graduating from high school, he joined J1 League club Júbilo Iwata in 2000. On 29 April 2001, he debuted as substitute forward from the 87th minute against Nagoya Grampus Eight. However he could hardly play in the match until 2002 and was released from the club in June 2002. In November, he joined Regional Leagues club Shizuoka FC. In 2004, he moved to J2 League club Consadole Sapporo. In 2004, he played as forward all 44 matches and scored 9 goals. In 2005, although his opportunity to play decreased, he scored 10 goals. However he could hardly play in the match in 2006. In October 2006, he moved to Regional Leagues club Shizuoka FC again and played until end of 2008 season. In 2009, he moved to Hong Kong and joined Convoy Sun Hei in Hong Kong First Division League.

== Career statistics ==
Appearances and goals by club, season and competition
Club	Season	League			Emperor's Cup		J.League Cup		Total	
Club	Season	Division	Apps	Goals	Apps	Goals	Apps	Goals	Apps	Goals
Júbilo Iwata	2000	J1 League	0	0	0	0	0	0	0	0
Júbilo Iwata	2001	J1 League	2	0	0	0	0	0	2	0
Júbilo Iwata	2002	J1 League	0	0	0	0	1	0	1	0
Consadole Sapporo	2004	J2 League	44	9	4	0	—		48	9
Consadole Sapporo	2005	J2 League	28	10	1	0	—		29	10
Consadole Sapporo	2006	J2 League	3	0	0	0	—		3	0
Career total			77	19	5	0	1	0	83	19

== Honours ==
- Hong Kong League Cup: 2008–09
