= Yasumasa Nishino (footballer) =

Japanese footballer

Yasumasa Nishino 西野 泰正
Personal information
- Full name: Yasumasa Nishino
- Date of birth: September 14, 1982 (age 44)
- Place of birth: Toyama, Japan
- Height: 1.82 m (5 ft 11 1/2 in)
- Positions: Forward; defender

Youth career
- 1998–2000: Toyama Daiichi High School

Senior career*
Years	Team	Apps	(Gls)
2001–2006	Júbilo Iwata	30	(1)
2005	→Shimizu S-Pulse (loan)	17	(0)
2007–2010	Kyoto Sanga FC	43	(3)
2011–2014	Kamatamare Sanuki	111	(24)
Total		201	(28)
Medal record
Júbilo Iwata
Winner	J1 League	2002
Runner-up	J1 League	2001
Runner-up	J1 League	2003
Runner-up	J.League Cup	2001
Winner	Emperor's Cup	2003
Runner-up	Emperor's Cup	2004
Shimizu S-Pulse
Runner-up	Emperor's Cup	2005
- * Club domestic league appearances and goals

Yasumasa Nishino (西野 泰正, Nishino Yasumasa; born September 14, 1982) is a former Japanese football player and current first-team coach J2 League club of Júbilo Iwata.

== Playing career ==
Nishino was born in Toyama on September 14, 1982. After graduating from high school, he joined J1 League club Júbilo Iwata in 2001. Although he played as forward, he could not play many matches behind Masashi Nakayama, Naohiro Takahara, Ryoichi Maeda, Rodrigo Gral and so on. In April 2005, he moved to Júbilo's cross town rivals, Shimizu S-Pulse on loan. He played many matches as substitute forward. In 2006, he returned to Júbilo. However he could hardly play in the match. In 2007, he moved to J2 League club Kyoto Sanga FC. He played many matches as substitute forward and the club was promoted to J1 from 2008. However he could hardly score goals. In 2009, he was converted to right side back. However he injured his left knee before opening 2009 season and he could not play at all in the match in 2009 season. Although he came back in 2010 season, he could not play many matches and the club was relegated to J2 end of 2010 season. In 2011, he moved to Japan Football League club Kamatamare Sanuki. He played as regular forward and scored many goals. The club was also promoted to J2 from 2014 season. He retired end of 2014 season.

== Career statistics ==
Appearances and goals by club, season and competition
Club	Season	League			Emperor's Cup		J.League Cup		Asia		Total	
Club	Season	Division	Apps	Goals	Apps	Goals	Apps	Goals	Apps	Goals	Apps	Goals
Júbilo Iwata	2001	J1 League	0	0	0	0	1	0	—		1	0
Júbilo Iwata	2002	J1 League	1	0	1	0	0	0	—		2	0
Júbilo Iwata	2003	J1 League	16	0	3	1	7	4	—		26	5
Júbilo Iwata	2004	J1 League	9	1	1	0	3	3	3	1	16	5
Júbilo Iwata	2005	J1 League	0	0	0	0	0	0	0	0	0	0
Shimizu S-Pulse	2005	J1 League	17	0	1	0	4	0	—		22	0
Júbilo Iwata	2006	J1 League	4	0	0	0	2	1	—		6	1
Kyoto Sanga FC	2007	J2 League	21	3	1	0	—		—		22	3
Kyoto Sanga FC	2008	J1 League	12	0	2	1	2	0	—		16	1
Kyoto Sanga FC	2009	J1 League	0	0	0	0	0	0	—		0	0
Kyoto Sanga FC	2010	J1 League	10	0	0	0	1	0	—		11	0
Kamatamare Sanuki	2011	Football League	31	8	1	0	—		—		32	8
Kamatamare Sanuki	2012	Football League	26	10	3	3	—		—		29	13
Kamatamare Sanuki	2013	Football League	28	6	1	0	—		—		29	6
Kamatamare Sanuki	2014	J2 League	26	0	1	0	—		—		27	0
Career total			201	28	15	5	20	8	3	1	239	42
