= Daisuke Saito =

Daisuke Saito may refer to:

- Daisuke Saito (footballer, born 1974) (斎藤 大輔), Japanese footballer
- Daisuke Saito (footballer, born 1980) (斉藤 大介), Japanese footballer
