= Takahiro Kawamura =

Japanese footballer

Takahiro Kawamura 河村 崇大
Personal information
- Full name: Takahiro Kawamura
- Date of birth: 4 October 1979 (age 47)
- Place of birth: Shimada, Shizuoka, Japan
- Height: 1.81 m (5 ft 11 1/2 in)
- Position: Midfielder

Youth career
- 1995–1997: Júbilo Iwata

Senior career*
Years	Team	Apps	(Gls)
1998–2008	Júbilo Iwata	92	(6)
1999	→River Plate (loan)	0	(0)
2006	→Cerezo Osaka (loan)	21	(2)
2007	→Kawasaki Frontale (loan)	15	(0)
2009	Tokyo Verdy	32	(0)
2010	Police United	7	(2)
2011–2015	TOT	89	(13)
2016	BEC Tero Sasana	10	(1)
Total		266	(24)
Medal record
Júbilo Iwata
Winner	J1 League	1999
Winner	J1 League	2002
Runner-up	J1 League	1998
Runner-up	J1 League	2001
Runner-up	J1 League	2003
Winner	J.League Cup	1998
Runner-up	J.League Cup	2001
Winner	Emperor's Cup	2003
Runner-up	Emperor's Cup	2004
Kawasaki Frontale
Runner-up	J.League Cup	2007
- * Club domestic league appearances and goals

Takahiro Kawamura (河村 崇大, Kawamura Takahiro; born 4 October 1979) is a former Japanese football player.

== Playing career ==
Kawamura was born in Shimada on 4 October 1979. He joined the J1 League club Júbilo Iwata youth team in 1998. He also moved to the Argentine club River Plate on loan in 1999. He played many matches as mainly defensive midfielder from 2001 and the club won the championship in the 2002 J1 League and the 2003 Emperor's Cup. However his opportunity to play decreased in 2005. In 2006, he moved to Cerezo Osaka. Although he played many matches, the club was relegated to the J2 League at the end of the 2006 season. In 2007, he moved to Kawasaki Frontale. Although he could not play many matches, the club won second place at the 2007 J.League Cup. In 2008, he returned to Júbilo Iwata. However he could not play many matches. In 2009, he moved to the J2 club Tokyo Verdy and he played many matches. In 2010, he moved to Thailand and played for Police United (2010), TOT (2011–15), and BEC Tero Sasana (2016). He retired at the end of the 2016 season.

== Career statistics ==
Appearances and goals by club, season and competition
Club	Season	League			Emperor's Cup		J.League Cup		Asia		Total	
Club	Season	Division	Apps	Goals	Apps	Goals	Apps	Goals	Apps	Goals	Apps	Goals
Júbilo Iwata	1998	J1 League	0	0	0	0	0	0	—		0	0
Júbilo Iwata	1999	J1 League	0	0	0	0	0	0	—		0	0
Júbilo Iwata	2000	J1 League	0	0	0	0	0	0	—		0	0
Júbilo Iwata	2001	J1 League	6	0	1	0	4	0	—		11	0
Júbilo Iwata	2002	J1 League	16	0	1	0	6	1	—		23	1
Júbilo Iwata	2003	J1 League	22	3	5	0	7	0	—		34	3
Júbilo Iwata	2004	J1 League	21	1	5	0	6	0	6	1	38	2
Júbilo Iwata	2005	J1 League	16	1	3	0	2	0	5	0	26	1
Cerezo Osaka	2006	J1 League	21	2	1	0	2	0	—		24	2
Kawasaki Frontale	2007	J1 League	15	0	4	0	3	0	4	0	26	0
Júbilo Iwata	2008	J1 League	11	1	2	1	3	0	—		16	2
Tokyo Verdy	2009	J2 League	32	0	0	0	—		—		32	0
Career total			160	8	22	1	33	1	15	1	230	10

== Honors and awards ==
=== Club ===
Júbilo Iwata

- J1 League: 2002
- Emperor's Cup: 2003
- Japanese Super Cup: 2003, 2004
