= Toshiyasu Takahara =

Japanese footballer

Toshiyasu Takahara 髙原 寿康
Personal information
- Full name: Toshiyasu Takahara
- Date of birth: October 18, 1980 (age 46)
- Place of birth: Gifu, Japan
- Height: 1.85 m (6 ft 1 in)
- Position: Goalkeeper

Youth career
- 1996–1998: Gifu Technical High School
- 1999–2002: Aichi Gakuin University

Senior career*
Years	Team	Apps	(Gls)
2003–2004	Júbilo Iwata	2	(0)
2005–2012	Consadole Sapporo	74	(0)
2013	Shimizu S-Pulse	0	(0)
2014–2018	Machida Zelvia	144	(0)
Total		220	(0)
Medal record
Júbilo Iwata
Runner-up	J1 League	2003
Winner	Emperor's Cup	2003
Runner-up	Emperor's Cup	2004
- * Club domestic league appearances and goals

Toshiyasu Takahara (髙原 寿康, Takahara Toshiyasu; born October 18, 1980) is a former Japanese football player.

== Club statistics ==
Updated to 31 December 2018.

Club performance			League		Cup		League Cup		Continental		Other^{1}		Total	
Season	Club	League	Apps	Goals	Apps	Goals	Apps	Goals	Apps	Goals	Apps	Goals	Apps	Goals
Japan			League		Emperor's Cup		J.League Cup		AFC		Other		Total	
2003	Júbilo Iwata	J1 League	2	0	0	0	1	0	-		-		3	0
2004	Júbilo Iwata	J1 League	0	0	0	0	0	0	0	0	-		0	0
2005	Consadole Sapporo	J2 League	10	0	0	0	-		-		-		10	0
2006	Consadole Sapporo	J2 League	4	0	0	0	-		-		-		4	0
2007	Consadole Sapporo	J2 League	0	0	0	0	-		-		-		0	0
2008	Consadole Sapporo	J1 League	0	0	0	0	0	0	-		-		0	0
2009	Consadole Sapporo	J2 League	16	0	2	0	-		-		-		18	0
2010	Consadole Sapporo	J2 League	34	0	1	0	-		-		-		35	0
2011	Consadole Sapporo	J2 League	0	0	0	0	-		-		-		0	0
2012	Consadole Sapporo	J1 League	10	0	1	0	0	0	-		-		11	0
2013	Shimizu S-Pulse	J1 League	0	0	1	0	1	0	-		-		2	0
2014	Machida Zelvia	J3 League	11	0	0	0	-		-		-		11	0
2015	Machida Zelvia	J3 League	36	0	0	0	-		-		2	0	38	0
2016	Machida Zelvia	J2 League	42	0	0	0	–		–		–		42	0
2017	Machida Zelvia	J2 League	42	0	1	0	–		–		–		43	0
2018	Machida Zelvia	J2 League	13	0	2	0	–		–		–		15	0
Career total			222	0	8	0	2	0	0	0	2	0	232	0

^{1}Includes J2/J3 Playoffs.
