= Takahiro Yamanishi =

Japanese footballer

Takahiro Yamanishi 山西 尊裕
Personal information
- Full name: Takahiro Yamanishi
- Date of birth: April 2, 1976 (age 50)
- Place of birth: Shizuoka, Shizuoka, Japan
- Height: 1.73 m (5 ft 8 in)
- Position: Defender

Youth career
- 1992–1994: Shimizu Higashi High School

Senior career*
Years	Team	Apps	(Gls)
1995–2004	Júbilo Iwata	148	(2)
2005–2008	Shimizu S-Pulse	74	(0)
Total		222	(2)

International career
1995	Japan U-20	3	(0)
Medal record
Júbilo Iwata
Winner	J1 League	1997
Winner	J1 League	1999
Winner	J1 League	2002
Runner-up	J1 League	1998
Runner-up	J1 League	2001
Runner-up	J1 League	2003
Winner	J.League Cup	1998
Runner-up	J.League Cup	1997
Runner-up	J.League Cup	2001
Winner	Emperor's Cup	2003
Runner-up	Emperor's Cup	2004
Shimizu S-Pulse
Runner-up	J.League Cup	2008
Runner-up	Emperor's Cup	2005
- * Club domestic league appearances and goals

Takahiro Yamanishi (山西 尊裕, Yamanishi Takahiro; born April 2, 1976) is a former Japanese football player.

== Club career ==
Yamanishi was born in Shizuoka on April 2, 1976. After graduating from Shimizu Higashi High School, he joined Júbilo Iwata in 1995. He debuted in 1997 and played many matches as left defender. The club won the champions 1997, 1999, 2002 J1 League, 1998 J.League Cup and 2003 Emperor's Cup. In Asia, the club won the champions 1998–99 Asian Club Championship and the 2nd place 1999–00 and 2000–01 Asian Club Championship. This is golden era in the club history. In 2005, he moved to across Shizuoka Prefecture to the Júbilo Iwata rivals, Shimizu S-Pulse. Although he played most games as left side-back, his opportunity to play decreased behind Arata Kodama from 2007. He retired at the end of the 2008 season.

== National team career ==
In April 1995, Yamanishi was elected Japan U-20 national team for 1995 World Youth Championship. He played 3 matches as left side midfielder.

== Club statistics ==
Club performance			League		Cup		League Cup		Continental		Total	
Season	Club	League	Apps	Goals	Apps	Goals	Apps	Goals	Apps	Goals	Apps	Goals
Japan			League		Emperor's Cup		J.League Cup		Asia		Total	
1995	Júbilo Iwata	J1 League	0	0	0	0	-		-		0	0
1996	Júbilo Iwata	J1 League	0	0	0	0	0	0	-		0	0
1997	Júbilo Iwata	J1 League	26	1	4	0	12	0	-		42	1
1998	Júbilo Iwata	J1 League	13	0	3	0	6	0	-		22	0
1999	Júbilo Iwata	J1 League	11	0	3	0	0	0	-		14	0
2000	Júbilo Iwata	J1 League	18	0	3	1	3	0	-		24	1
2001	Júbilo Iwata	J1 League	13	0	1	0	4	0	-		18	0
2002	Júbilo Iwata	J1 League	24	1	3	0	7	0	-		34	1
2003	Júbilo Iwata	J1 League	25	0	5	0	9	0	-		39	0
2004	Júbilo Iwata	J1 League	18	0	2	0	5	0	4	0	29	0
2005	Shimizu S-Pulse	J1 League	34	0	5	0	7	0	-		46	0
2006	Shimizu S-Pulse	J1 League	32	0	3	0	5	0	-		40	0
2007	Shimizu S-Pulse	J1 League	1	0	0	0	2	0	-		3	0
2008	Shimizu S-Pulse	J1 League	7	0	1	0	6	0	-		14	0
Total			222	2	33	1	66	0	4	0	325	3

== Honors and awards ==
=== Club ===
Júbilo Iwata

- AFC Champions League: 1998–99
- Asian Super Cup: 1999
- J1 League: 1997, 1999, 2002
- Emperor's Cup: 2003
- J.League Cup: 1998
- Japanese Super Cup: 2000, 2003, 2004
