= Ari (footballer, born 1980) =

Brazilian footballer

Personal information
- Full name: Arivaldo Alves dos Santos
- Date of birth: November 19, 1980 (age 45)
- Place of birth: Bahia, Brazil
- Height: 1.80 m (5 ft 11 in)
- Position: Midfielder

Senior career*
Years	Team	Apps	(Gls)
2000	Itabaiana		
2001	Sergipe		
2002	Guaratinguetá		
2003	River		
2003–2005	Bahia		
2005	Kashima Antlers		
2006	Internacional		
2006	Atlético Mineiro		
2007	Fortaleza		
2008	Atlético Goianiense		
2008	Criciúma		
- * Club domestic league appearances and goals

Arivaldo Alves dos Santos (born November 19, 1980), known as just Ari, is a Brazilian football player.

== Club statistics ==
Club performance			League		Cup		League Cup		Total	
Season	Club	League	Apps	Goals	Apps	Goals	Apps	Goals	Apps	Goals
Japan			League		Emperor's Cup		League Cup		Total	
2005	Kashima Antlers	J1 League	14	0	0	0	3	0	17	0
Total	Japan		14	0	0	0	3	0	17	0
Career total			14	0	0	0	3	0	17	0
