= Nobuo Kawaguchi =

Japanese footballer

Nobuo Kawaguchi 川口 信男
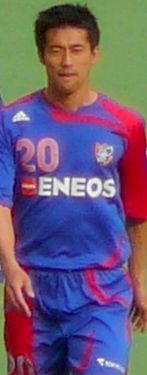

Personal information
- Full name: Nobuo Kawaguchi
- Date of birth: April 10, 1975 (age 51)
- Place of birth: Sanjo, Niigata, Japan
- Height: 1.78 m (5 ft 10 in)
- Position: Forward

Youth career
- 1991–1993: Niigata Technical High School
- 1994–1997: Juntendo University

Senior career*
Years	Team	Apps	(Gls)
1998–2005	Júbilo Iwata	139	(12)
2006–2008	FC Tokyo	45	(3)
Total		184	(15)
Medal record
Júbilo Iwata
Winner	J1 League	1999
Winner	J1 League	2002
Runner-up	J1 League	1998
Runner-up	J1 League	2001
Runner-up	J1 League	2003
Winner	J.League Cup	1998
Runner-up	J.League Cup	2001
Winner	Emperor's Cup	2003
Runner-up	Emperor's Cup	2004
- * Club domestic league appearances and goals

Nobuo Kawaguchi (川口 信男, Kawaguchi Nobuo; born April 10, 1975) is a former Japanese football player.

== Playing career ==
Kawaguchi was born in Sanjo on April 10, 1975. After graduating from Juntendo University, he joined J1 League club Júbilo Iwata in 1998. He played many matches as forward from first season and the club won the champions 1998 Emperor's Cup. At the Final, he scored 2 goals and was selected MVP award. The club also won the champions 1998–99 Asian Club Championship first Asian title in club history. From 2000, he also played many matches as substitute right side midfielder not only forward. The club won the champions 2002 J1 League and 2003 Emperor's Cup. However his opportunity to play decreased from 2004. On 2006, he moved to FC Tokyo. Although he played many matches in 2006, his opportunity to play decreased from 2007 and he retired end of 2008 season.

== Club statistics ==
Club performance			League		Cup		League Cup		Continental		Total	
Season	Club	League	Apps	Goals	Apps	Goals	Apps	Goals	Apps	Goals	Apps	Goals
Japan			League		Emperor's Cup		J.League Cup		Asia		Total	
1998	Júbilo Iwata	J1 League	20	3	3	0	5	3	-		28	6
1999	Júbilo Iwata	J1 League	18	1	1	0	4	0	-		23	1
2000	Júbilo Iwata	J1 League	20	3	3	2	3	0	-		26	5
2001	Júbilo Iwata	J1 League	23	0	0	0	8	1	-		31	1
2002	Júbilo Iwata	J1 League	23	3	3	1	7	1	-		33	5
2003	Júbilo Iwata	J1 League	19	1	3	2	6	0	-		28	3
2004	Júbilo Iwata	J1 League	8	0	4	1	5	0	3	0	20	1
2005	Júbilo Iwata	J1 League	8	1	1	0	0	0	5	1	14	2
2006	FC Tokyo	J1 League	24	3	2	0	6	0	-		32	3
2007	FC Tokyo	J1 League	14	0	3	0	4	0	-		21	0
2008	FC Tokyo	J1 League	7	0	0	0	2	0	-		9	0
Total			184	15	20	6	50	5	8	1	244	37

== Honors and awards ==
=== Individual ===
- J.League Cup MVP: 1998

=== Club ===
Júbilo Iwata

- AFC Champions League: 1998–99
- Asian Super Cup: 1999
- J1 League: 1999, 2002
- J.League Cup: 1998
- Japanese Super Cup: 2000, 2003
