= Norihiro Nishi =

Japanese footballer

Norihiro Nishi 西 紀寛
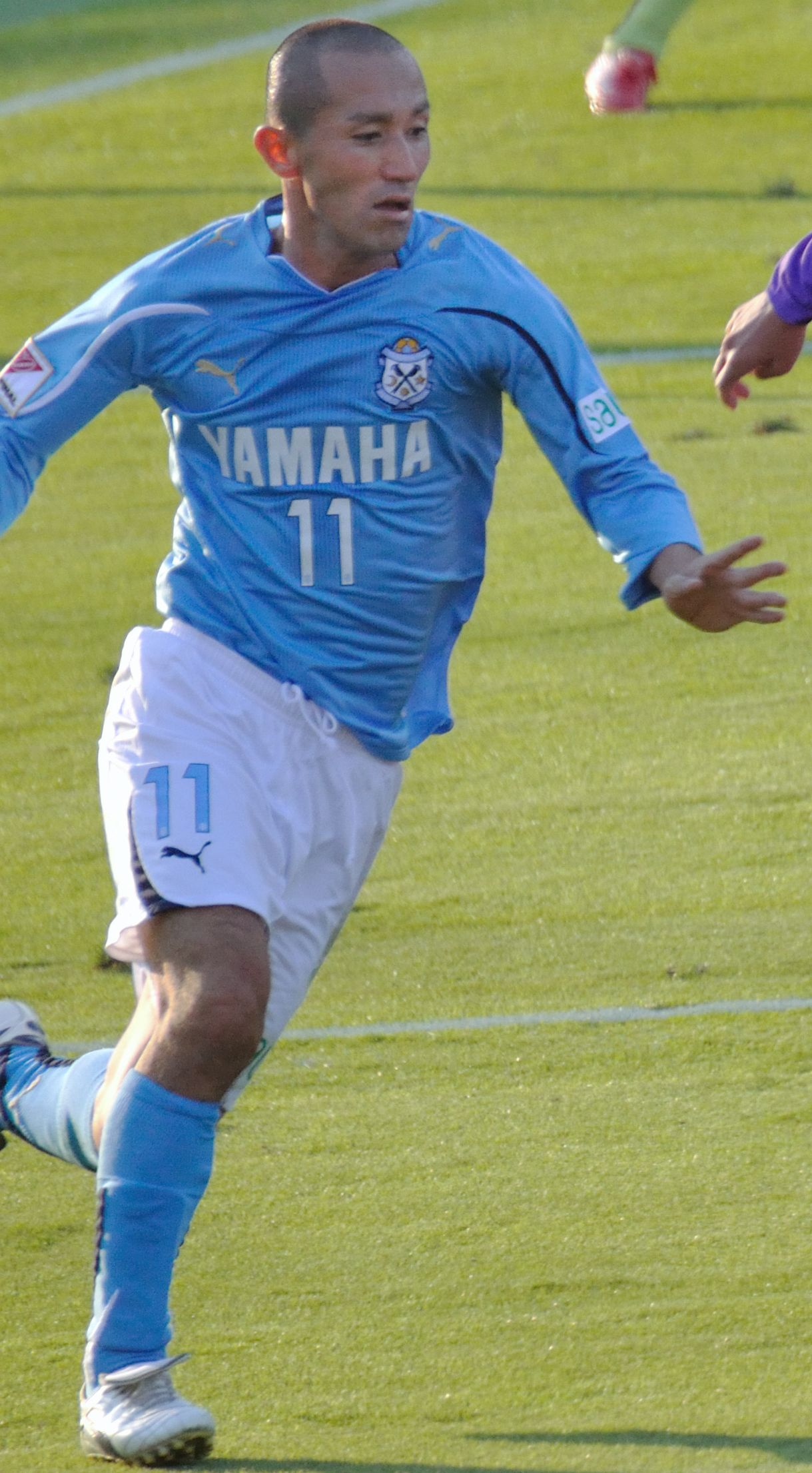

Personal information
- Full name: Norihiro Nishi
- Date of birth: May 9, 1980 (age 46)
- Place of birth: Takatsuki, Osaka, Japan
- Height: 1.75 m (5 ft 9 in)
- Position: Midfielder

Youth career
- 1996–1998: Ichiritsu Funabashi High School

Senior career*
Years	Team	Apps	(Gls)
1999–2011	Júbilo Iwata	255	(36)
2012–2013	Tokyo Verdy	73	(11)
2014	Police United	17	(2)
2016	Okinawa SV		
Total		345	(49)

International career
2004	Japan	5	(0)
Medal record
Júbilo Iwata
Winner	J1 League	1999
Winner	J1 League	2002
Runner-up	J1 League	2001
Runner-up	J1 League	2003
Winner	J.League Cup	2010
Runner-up	J.League Cup	2001
Winner	Emperor's Cup	2003
Runner-up	Emperor's Cup	2004
Representing Japan
AFC Asian Cup
Gold medal – first place	2004 China
- * Club domestic league appearances and goals

Norihiro Nishi (西 紀寛, Nishi Norihiro; born May 9, 1980) is a former Japanese football player. He played for Japan national team.

== Club career ==
Nishi was born in Takatsuki on May 9, 1980. After graduating from high school, he joined Júbilo Iwata in 1999. He played many matches from first season. The club won the champions 1999, 2002 J1 League and 2003 Emperor's Cup. In Asia, the club won the champions 1998–99 Asian Club Championship and 2nd place 1999–00 and 2000–01 Asian Club Championship. His opportunity to play decreased for injury from 2004. In 2009 and 2010, he played most matches and the club won 2010 J.League Cup. He moved to Tokyo Verdy in 2012 and played until 2013. After that, he played for Police United (2014) and Okinawa SV (2016). He retired end of 2016 season.

== National team career ==
In September 2000, Nishi was elected Japan U-23 national team for 2000 Summer Olympics, but he did not play in the match.

On April 25, 2004, Nishi debuted for Japan national team against Hungary. In July, he was elected Japan for 2004 Asian Cup. He played 2 matches and Japan won the champions. He played 5 games for Japan in 2004.

== Career statistics ==
Appearances and goals by club, season and competition
Club	Season	League			Emperor's Cup		J.League Cup		Asia		Total	
Club	Season	Division	Apps	Goals	Apps	Goals	Apps	Goals	Apps	Goals	Apps	Goals
Júbilo Iwata	1999	J1 League	13	4	3	0	1	0	—		17	4
Júbilo Iwata	2000	J1 League	19	3	3	0	0	0	—		22	3
Júbilo Iwata	2001	J1 League	22	2	2	1	7	0	—		31	3
Júbilo Iwata	2002	J1 League	26	4	3	0	7	1	—		36	5
Júbilo Iwata	2003	J1 League	24	1	5	1	8	0	—		37	2
Júbilo Iwata	2004	J1 League	17	4	4	2	0	0	4	1	25	7
Júbilo Iwata	2005	J1 League	19	3	1	2	0	0	4	1	24	6
Júbilo Iwata	2006	J1 League	16	4	2	1	5	0	—		23	5
Júbilo Iwata	2007	J1 League	17	2	1	0	0	0	—		18	2
Júbilo Iwata	2008	J1 League	12	2	2	1	6	1	—		20	4
Júbilo Iwata	2009	J1 League	29	4	2	0	4	0	—		9	0
Júbilo Iwata	2010	J1 League	31	3	2	0	7	1	—		40	4
Júbilo Iwata	2011	J1 League	10	0	0	0	2	0	—		12	0
Tokyo Verdy	2012	J2 League	38	6	1	0	—		—		39	6
Tokyo Verdy	2013	J2 League	35	5	2	0	—		—		37	5
Career total			328	47	33	8	47	3	8	2	416	60

== National team statistics ==
Japan national team
Year	Apps	Goals
2004	5	0
Total	5	0

=== Appearances in major competitions ===
Year	Competition	Category	Appearances		Goals	Team record
Year	Competition	Category	Start	Sub	Goals	Team record
2000	2000 Olympics	U-23	0	0	0	Quarterfinals
2004	2004 AFC Asian Cup	Senior	0	2	0	Champion

== Honors and awards ==
=== Club ===
Júbilo Iwata

- AFC Champions League: 1999
- Asian Super Cup: 1999
- J1 League: 1999, 2002
- Emperor's Cup: 2003
- Japanese Super Cup: 2000, 2003, 2004

=== International ===
Japan

- AFC Asian Cup: 2004
