= Naoya Kikuchi =

Japanese footballer

Naoya Kikuchi 菊地 直哉
Personal information
- Full name: Naoya Kikuchi
- Date of birth: November 24, 1984 (age 41)
- Place of birth: Shizuoka, Shizuoka, Japan
- Height: 1.81 m (5 ft 11 in)
- Position: Defender

Team information
- Current team: Sagan Tosu (assistant manager)

Youth career
- 1997–1999: Shimizu S-Pulse
- 2000–2002: Shimizu Shogyo High School

Senior career*
Years	Team	Apps	(Gls)
2003–2007	Júbilo Iwata	79	(5)
2005	→ Albirex Niigata (loan)	15	(1)
2008–2009	Carl Zeiss Jena	20	(0)
2009–2010	Oita Trinita	45	(0)
2011–2013	Albirex Niigata	45	(1)
2013–2016	Sagan Tosu	71	(0)
2016–2018	Hokkaido Consadole Sapporo	33	(0)
2019	Avispa Fukuoka	10	(0)

International career
2001	Japan U-17	3	(0)
2003	Japan U-20	5	(0)
2004	Japan U-23	1	(0)
2010	Japan	1	(0)
Medal record
Júbilo Iwata
Runner-up	J1 League	2003
Winner	Emperor's Cup	2003
Runner-up	Emperor's Cup	2004
Representing Japan
AFC U-19 Championship
Silver medal – second place	2002 Qatar
- * Club domestic league appearances and goals

Naoya Kikuchi (菊地 直哉, Kikuchi Naoya; born November 24, 1984) is a Japanese football coach and former professional player. he is the currently assistant manager of J2 League club Sagan Tosu.

Though naturally a central midfielder, Kikuchi also operated as a central defender and a left-back.

== Club career ==
Kikuchi played for the Shimizu S-Pulse junior youth team and Shimizu Commercial High School, which has a strong soccer tradition with players such as Shinji Ono among its alumni. After graduating the school, he joined Júbilo Iwata and briefly loaned to Albirex Niigata. In 2002, he was invited to have a try-out at Arsenal and later went on to have another trial with Dutch team Feyenoord.

On June 13, 2007, Kikuchi was arrested in Hamamatsu city for the charge of a statutory rape on a 15-year-old high school student. He was suspended on indictment and released some days later. On June 29, 2007, he was sacked by the club after the scandal. The Japan Football Association imposed one-year suspension on him. After performing voluntary community service for some months, he moved to Germany and joined FC Carl Zeiss Jena.

In summer 2009, Kikuchi left FC Carl Zeiss Jena. After trialling with another German club, FC Schalke 04, he signed for Oita Trinita on July 27, 2009. In the winter of 2010, Kikuchi transferred from Oita to Albirex Niigata. Kikuchi retired at the end of the 2019 season.

== International career ==
Kikuchi was part of the 2004 Olympic football team for Japan that exited the tournament in the first round, having finished last in group B behind the teams from Paraguay, Italy, and Ghana. He also had an impressive 2001 U-17 World Championship. He capped for Japan U-20 national team at the 2003 World Youth Championship.

He made his full international debut for Japan on January 6, 2010, in a 2011 AFC Asian Cup qualification against Yemen.

== Career statistics ==
=== Club ===
As of end of 2018 season

Club performance			League		Cup		League Cup		Continental		Total	
Season	Club	League	Apps	Goals	Apps	Goals	Apps	Goals	Apps	Goals	Apps	Goals
Japan			League		Emperor's Cup		J.League Cup		AFC		Total	
2003	Júbilo Iwata	J1 League	7	0	3	0	2	0	–		12	0
2004	Júbilo Iwata	J1 League	18	1	5	0	5	0	2	0	30	1
2005	Júbilo Iwata	J1 League	9	0	–		1	1	4	0	14	1
2005	Albirex Niigata	J1 League	15	1	2	0	–		–		17	1
2006	Júbilo Iwata	J1 League	32	3	3	0	8	0	–		43	3
2007	Júbilo Iwata	J1 League	13	1	–		4	0	–		17	1
Germany			League		DFB-Pokal		Other		Europe		Total	
2007–08	Carl Zeiss Jena	2. Bundesliga	3	0	1	0	–		–		4	0
2008–09	Carl Zeiss Jena	3. Liga	17	0	1	0	–		–		18	0
Japan			League		Emperor's Cup		J.League Cup		AFC		Total	
2009	Oita Trinita	J1 League	10	0	2	0	–		–		12	0
2010	Oita Trinita	J2 League	35	0	1	0	–		–		36	0
2011	Albirex Niigata	J1 League	23	0	2	0	3	1	–		28	1
2012	Albirex Niigata	J1 League	18	1	1	0	4	0	–		23	1
2013	Albirex Niigata	J1 League	4	0	–		3	0	–		7	0
2013	Sagan Tosu	J1 League	15	0	5	0	–		–		20	0
2014	Sagan Tosu	J1 League	21	0	3	0	3	0	–		27	0
2015	Sagan Tosu	J1 League	31	0	3	0	1	0	–		35	0
2016	Sagan Tosu	J1 League	4	0	–		4	0	–		8	0
2016	Consadole Sapporo	J2 League	17	0	1	0	–		–		18	0
2017	Consadole Sapporo	J1 League	16	0	1	0	4	0	–		21	0
2018	Consadole Sapporo	J1 League	0	0	1	0	0	0	–		1	0
Career total			303	7	35	0	42	2	6	0	386	9

=== International ===
Japan national team
Year	Apps	Goals
2010	1	0
Total	1	0
