= Toshimitsu Yoshida =

Japanese football referee (born 1963)

Toshimitsu Yoshida (吉田寿光, Yoshida Toshshimitsu)
- Born: 29 August 1963 (age 63) (Japan) Tochigi

Domestic
Years	League	Role
1997-2017	(Japan) J.League	Referee
2012-13	(China) Chinese Super League	Referee

International
Years	League	Role
2001-05	Asian Football Confederation	Referee

Toshimitsu Yoshida (吉田寿光, Yoshida Toshshimitsu; born 29 August 1963) is a Japanese football referee currently officiating in the J.League. Yoshida was suspended at international level by the Asian Football Confederation for a controversial decision made during a 2006 FIFA World Cup qualification match between Bahrain and Uzbekistan in which Uzbekistan should have retaken a penalty for encroachment but instead awarded a free-kick to Bahrain.
