= 2003 Emperor's Cup =

Tournament details
- Country: Japan
- Teams: 80

Final positions
- Champions: Júbilo Iwata (1st title)
- Runners-up: Cerezo Osaka
- Semifinalists: Shimizu S-Pulse; Kashima Antlers

The 83rd Emperor's Cup Statistics of Emperor's Cup in the 2003 season.

== Overview ==
It was contested by 80 teams, and Júbilo Iwata won the cup for the first time.

== Results ==
=== First round ===
- Hannan University 2–0 Wakayama Kihoku Shukyudan
- Ichiritsu Funabashi High School 1–0 Thespa Kusatsu
- Kanazawa 4–1 Yamaguchi Teachers
- Sanfrecce Hiroshima 1–0 Kwansei Gakuin University
- Omiya Ardija 5–0 Matsuzaka University
- Tochigi SC 5–2 Aomori Yamada High School
- Avispa Fukuoka 7–0 Tokai University
- Maruyasu Okazaki 1–0 Kibi International University
- Okinawa Kariyushi 1–0 Sagan Tosu
- ALO's Hokuriku 3–2 Doto University
- Consadole Sapporo 4–0 Jinsei Gakuen High School
- Shizuoka Sangyo University 4–2 Shiga Yasu High School
- Montedio Yamagata 4–3 Gifu Kogyo High School
- Ritsumeikan University 4–1 Tsuruoka Higashi High School
- Honda FC 5–0 Nirasaki Astros
- Tsukuba University 5–0 Matsusho Gakuen High School
- Otsuka Pharmaceuticals 5–0 Iwami FC
- TDK 3–1 Alouette Kumamoto
- Kawasaki Frontale 2–0 Juntendo University
- Kunimi High School 4–0 Panasonic Energy Tokushima
- Mito HollyHock 1–0 Sanfrecce Hiroshima Youth
- Gainare Tottori 1–0 Nippon Bunri University
- Shonan Bellmare 6–1 Tenri University
- Ehime FC 4–1 Japan Soccer College
- Yokohama 8–1 Viancone Fukushima
- Fukuoka University of Education 1–1(PK 6–5) Sony Sendai
- Ventforet Kofu 3–0 Fukui University of Technology
- Momoyama Gakuin University 6–1 Profesor Miyazaki
- Albirex Niigata 5–0 Volca Kagoshima
- Kochi University 3–1 Morioka Zebra
- Honda Luminoso Sayama 1–0 Komazawa University
- Sagawa Express Tokyo 4–0 Kyushu INAX

=== Second round ===
- Ichiritsu Funabashi High School 1–0 Hannan University
- Kawasaki Frontale 7–1 Kunimi High School
- Honda FC 2–1 Tsukuba University
- Avispa Fukuoka 3–0 Maruyasu Okazaki
- Yokohama 5–0 Fukuoka University of Education
- Albirex Niigata 2–0 Kochi University
- Omiya Ardija 4–0 Tochigi SC
- Shonan Bellmare 2–1 Ehime FC
- Mito HollyHock 4–1 Gainare Tottori
- Sanfrecce Hiroshima 3–0 Kanazawa
- ALO's Hokuriku 2–1 Okinawa Kariyushi
- Consadole Sapporo 3–2 Shizuoka Sangyo University
- Montedio Yamagata 6–1 Ritsumeikan University
- Sagawa Express Tokyo 2–1 Honda Luminoso Sayama
- Otsuka Pharmaceuticals 6–0 TDK
- Ventforet Kofu 2–1 Momoyama Gakuin University

=== Third round ===
- Yokohama F. Marinos 2–2(PK 4–1) Funabashi Municipal High School
- Gamba Osaka 3–1 Consadole Sapporo
- Júbilo Iwata 2–0 Sagawa Express Tokyo
- Tokyo Verdy 2–1 Ventforet Kofu
- Cerezo Osaka 4–1 ALO's Hokuriku
- Nagoya Grampus Eight 1–0 Yokohama
- Kashiwa Reysol 1–0 Omiya Ardija
- Sanfrecce Hiroshima 2–0 Kyoto Purple Sanga
- Shimizu S-Pulse 2–0 Mito HollyHock
- Kashima Antlers 3–2 Avispa Fukuoka
- Kawasaki Frontale 3–0 Oita Trinita
- Albirex Niigata 2–1 Vegalta Sendai
- JEF United Ichihara 5–0 Otsuka Pharmaceuticals
- Shonan Bellmare 2–1 Urawa Red Diamonds
- Vissel Kobe 3–0 Montedio Yamagata
- FC Tokyo 2–2 Honda FC

=== Fourth round ===
- Kashima Antlers 3–2 Kashiwa Reysol
- Yokohama F. Marinos 2–1 Sanfrecce Hiroshima
- JEF United Ichihara 5–0 Kawasaki Frontale
- Júbilo Iwata 4–0 Albirex Niigata
- Cerezo Osaka 3–2 Gamba Osaka
- Shimizu S-Pulse 2–1 Shonan Bellmare
- Vissel Kobe 2–2(PK 5–4) FC Tokyo
- Tokyo Verdy 1–0 Nagoya Grampus Eight

=== Quarterfinals ===
- Kashima Antlers 4–1 Yokohama F. Marinos
- Shimizu S-Pulse 1–0 JEF United Ichihara
- Cerezo Osaka 3–2 Vissel Kobe
- Júbilo Iwata 3–0 Tokyo Verdy

=== Semifinals ===
- Júbilo Iwata 4–2 Shimizu S-Pulse
- Cerezo Osaka 2–1 Kashima Antlers

=== Final ===
- Júbilo Iwata 1–0 Cerezo Osaka

Júbilo Iwata won the championship and guaranteed a place in the 2004 AFC Champions League after Kyoto Purple Sanga were relegated to Division 2.
