= Takashi Fukunishi =

Japanese footballer

Takashi Fukunishi 福西 崇史
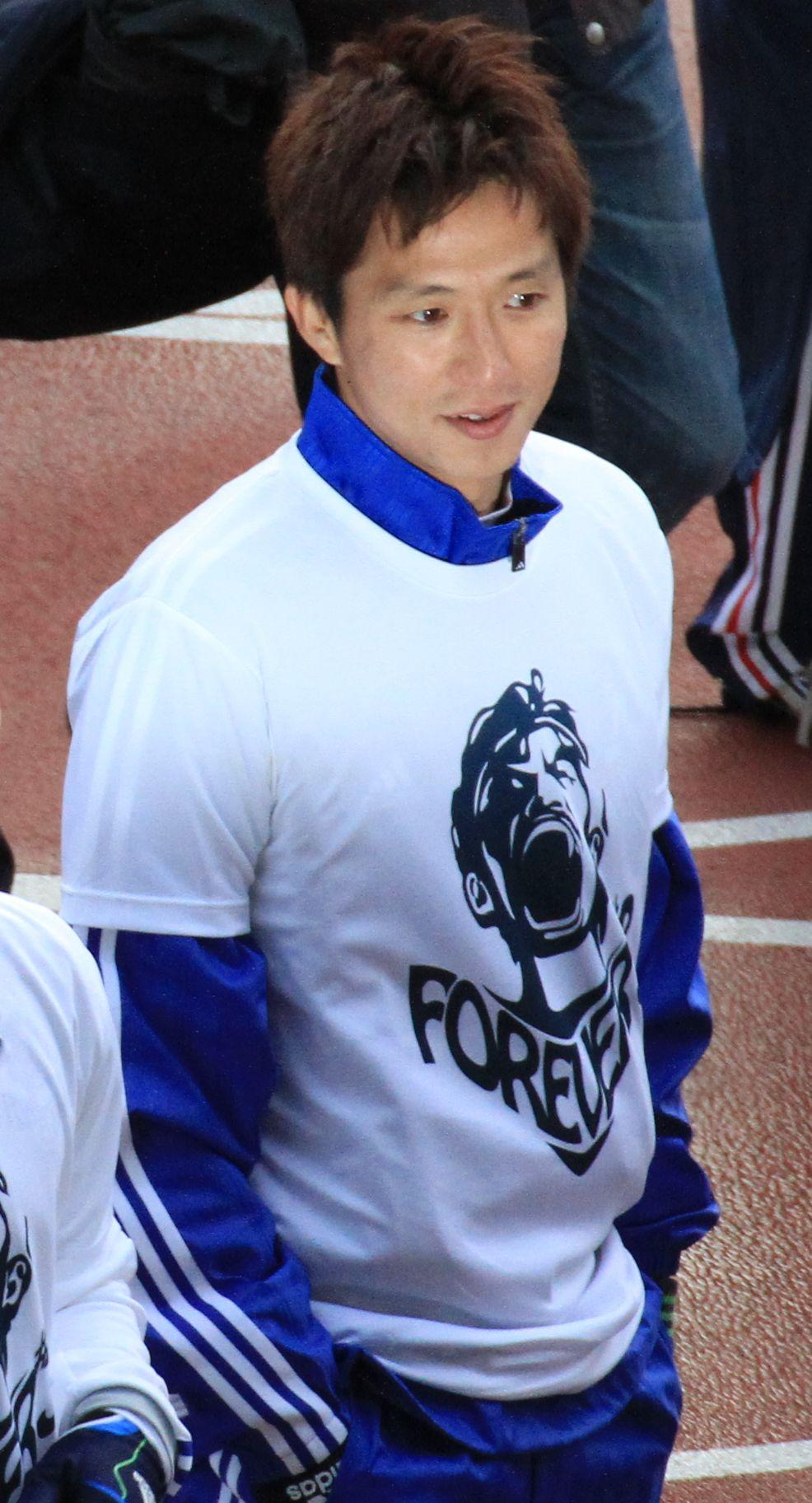
- Fukunishi in 2012

Personal information
- Full name: Takashi Fukunishi
- Date of birth: September 1, 1976 (age 50)
- Place of birth: Niihama, Ehime, Japan
- Height: 1.81 m (5 ft 11 in)
- Position: Midfielder

Youth career
- 1992–1994: Niihama Kogyo High School

Senior career*
Years	Team	Apps	(Gls)
1995–2006	Júbilo Iwata	292	(53)
2007	FC Tokyo	28	(6)
2008	Tokyo Verdy	29	(3)
Total		349	(62)

International career
1999–2006	Japan	64	(7)
Medal record
Júbilo Iwata
Winner	J1 League	1997
Winner	J1 League	1999
Winner	J1 League	2002
Runner-up	J1 League	1998
Runner-up	J1 League	2001
Runner-up	J1 League	2003
Winner	J.League Cup	1998
Runner-up	J.League Cup	1997
Runner-up	J.League Cup	2001
Winner	Emperor's Cup	2003
Runner-up	Emperor's Cup	2004
Representing Japan
AFC Asian Cup
Gold medal – first place	2004 China
- * Club domestic league appearances and goals

Takashi Fukunishi (福西 崇史, Fukunishi Takashi; born September 1, 1976) is a Japanese former professional footballer who played as a midfielder. He played for Japan national team.

== Club career ==
Fukunishi was born in Niihama on September 1, 1976. After graduating from high school, he joined Júbilo Iwata in 1995. He played as defensive midfielder with Dunga in 1990s. After that, he became a central player in golden era in club history. The club won the champions at 1997, 1999 and 2002 J1 League. The club also 1998 J.League Cup and 2003 Emperor's Cup. In Asia, the club won the champions 1998–99 Asian Club Championship and the 2nd place 1999–00 and 2000–01 Asian Club Championship. After that, he played FC Tokyo (2007) and Tokyo Verdy (2008).

== International career ==
In June 1999, Fukunishi was selected Japan national team for 1999 Copa América. At this competition, on June 29, he debuted against Peru. Although there were few opportunities for him to play, he was selected for the Japanese squad at the 2002 FIFA World Cup and played five minutes as a substitute against Russia. After the 2002 FIFA World Cup, he became a regular player from 2004 on. At 2000 AFC Asian Cup, he played all six matches and scored two goals, including Japan's first goal in the final. He also played at 2005 FIFA Confederations Cup and the 2006 FIFA World Cup. He played 64 games and scored 7 goals for Japan until 2006.

== Career statistics ==
=== Club ===
Appearances and goals by club, season and competition
Club	Season	League			Emperor's Cup		J.League Cup		Asia		Total	
Club	Season	Division	Apps	Goals	Apps	Goals	Apps	Goals	Apps	Goals	Apps	Goals
Júbilo Iwata	1995	J1 League	10	1	0	0	–		–		10	1
Júbilo Iwata	1996	J1 League	27	2	1	1	10	0	–		38	3
Júbilo Iwata	1997	J1 League	21	4	3	1	6	1	–		30	4
Júbilo Iwata	1998	J1 League	22	2	3	0	5	1	–		30	3
Júbilo Iwata	1999	J1 League	27	10	0	0	3	1	–		30	11
Júbilo Iwata	2000	J1 League	27	5	3	0	4	0	–		34	5
Júbilo Iwata	2001	J1 League	29	4	2	0	7	0	–		38	4
Júbilo Iwata	2002	J1 League	28	5	3	0	1	0	–		32	5
Júbilo Iwata	2003	J1 League	26	5	0	0	8	0	–		34	5
Júbilo Iwata	2004	J1 League	26	6	5	0	0	0	4	1	31	6
Júbilo Iwata	2005	J1 League	23	2	2	1	1	0	2	0	26	3
Júbilo Iwata	2006	J1 League	26	7	3	1	1	0	–		30	8
FC Tokyo	2007	J1 League	28	6	0	0	6	1	–		34	7
Tokyo Verdy	2008	J1 League	29	3	1	0	5	0	–		35	3
Career total			349	62	26	4	57	4	6	1	432	70

=== International ===
Appearances and goals by national team and year
National team	Year	Apps	Goals
Japan	1999	3	0
Japan	2000	0	0
Japan	2001	2	0
Japan	2002	10	0
Japan	2003	6	0
Japan	2004	18	5
Japan	2005	14	1
Japan	2006	11	1
Total		64	7

Scores and results list Japan's goal tally first, score column indicates score after each Fukunishi goal.

List of international goals scored by Takashi Fukunishi
No.	Date	Venue	Opponent	Score	Result	Competition
1	June 9, 2004	Saitama, Japan	India		7–0	2006 FIFA World Cup qualification
2	July 9, 2004	Hiroshima, Japan	Slovakia		3–1	Kirin Cup 2004
3	July 24, 2004	Chongqing, China	Thailand		4–1	2004 AFC Asian Cup
4	August 7, 2004	Beijing, China	China		3–1	2004 AFC Asian Cup
5	September 8, 2004	Kolkata, India	India		4–0	2006 FIFA World Cup qualification
6	March 25, 2005	Tehran, Iran	Iran		1–2	2006 FIFA World Cup qualification
7	February 22, 2006	Yokohama, Japan	India		6–0	2007 AFC Asian Cup qualification

== Honors ==
Júbilo Iwata

- AFC Champions League: 1999
- Asian Super Cup: 1999
- J1 League: 1997, 1999, 2002
- J.League Cup: 1998
- Japanese Super Cup: 2000, 2003, 2004

Japan

- AFC Asian Cup: 2004

Individua

- J1 League Best Eleven: 1999, 2001, 2002, 2003
