= Makoto Tanaka =

Japanese football manager

Makoto Tanaka 田中 誠
Personal information
- Full name: Makoto Tanaka
- Date of birth: August 8, 1975 (age 51)
- Place of birth: Shizuoka, Shizuoka, Japan
- Height: 1.78 m (5 ft 10 in)
- Position: Defender

Team information
- Current team: Kashima Antlers (Assistant Manager)

Youth career
- 1991–1993: Shimizu Shogyo High School

Senior career*
Years	Team	Apps	(Gls)
1994–2008	Júbilo Iwata	353	(10)
2009–2011	Avispa Fukuoka	66	(2)
Total		419	(12)

International career
1996	Japan U23	3	(0)
2004–2006	Japan	32	(0)

Managerial career
- 2017–2020: Júbilo Iwata (assistant)
- 2024: Tochigi SC
- 2025–: Kashima Antlers (assistant)
Medal record
Júbilo Iwata
Winner	J1 League	1997
Winner	J1 League	1999
Winner	J1 League	2002
Runner-up	J1 League	1998
Runner-up	J1 League	2001
Runner-up	J1 League	2003
Winner	J.League Cup	1998
Runner-up	J.League Cup	1994
Runner-up	J.League Cup	1997
Runner-up	J.League Cup	2001
Winner	Emperor's Cup	2003
Runner-up	Emperor's Cup	2004
Representing Japan
AFC Asian Cup
Gold medal – first place	2004 China
- * Club domestic league appearances and goals

Makoto Tanaka (田中 誠, Tanaka Makoto; born August 8, 1975) is a Japanese professional football manager and former player.

Tanaka spent the majority of his career with Júbilo Iwata, forming a part of the team's 'glory years' that won the club's first Asian Club Championship in 1999, and three Japanese league titles between 1997 and 2002. After leaving the club in 2008, Tanaka then had a stint with Avispa Fukuoka, before retiring at the end of the 2011 season. He was capped 32 times for the Japan national team and was part of the squad that won the 2004 AFC Asian Cup.

== Club career ==
Tanaka was born in Shizuoka on August 8, 1975. After graduating from Shimizu Commercial High School, he joined Júbilo Iwata in 1994. From 1997, he became a regular player as center back and central player in golden era in club history. The club won many title 1997, 1999, 2002 J1 League, 1998 J.League Cup and 2003 Emperor's Cup. In Asia, the club won the champions 1998–99 Asian Club Championship and the 2nd place 1999–00 and 2000–01 Asian Club Championship. He left the club end of 2008 season for generational change. He moved to J2 League club Avispa Fukuoka in 2009. The club won the 3rd place in 2010 and was promoted to J1 League. He announced his retirement at the end of the 2011 season having played over 500 in his career.

== National team career ==
In July 1996, Tanaka was selected for the Japanese U-23 team for the 1996 Summer Olympics. He played in all 3 of Japan's matches as they were eliminated in the group stage, despite two wins, including one against Brazil. It was known as the "Miracle of Miami" (マイアミの奇跡) in Japan.

On April 25, 2004, Tanaka debuted for the Japan national team against Hungary. At the 2004 AFC Asian Cup in China, he played all 6 matches as Japan won the title. He also represented Japan at the 2005 FIFA Confederations Cup. In 2006, he was called up for Japan's 2006 FIFA World Cup squad, but had to withdraw after sustaining a thigh injury prior to the tournament. In total, he played 32 matches for the national team.

== Managerial career ==
In December 2023, it was announced that Tanaka would be taking on his first managerial role with J2 League club Tochigi SC for the 2024 season. After only recording three wins in his first 15 league games in charge, Tanaka was dismissed in May 2024 after only three months in charge.

== Career statistics ==
=== Club ===
Appearances and goals by club, season and competition
Club	Season	League			Emperor's Cup		J.League Cup		Asia		Total	
Club	Season	Division	Apps	Goals	Apps	Goals	Apps	Goals	Apps	Goals	Apps	Goals
Júbilo Iwata	1994	J1 League	6	0	1	0	0	0	—		7	0
Júbilo Iwata	1995	J1 League	21	0	2	0	—		—		23	0
Júbilo Iwata	1996	J1 League	18	0	1	0	7	0	—		26	0
Júbilo Iwata	1997	J1 League	23	0	4	0	9	0	—		36	0
Júbilo Iwata	1998	J1 League	32	2	3	0	5	0	—		40	2
Júbilo Iwata	1999	J1 League	16	0	0	0	0	0	—		16	0
Júbilo Iwata	2000	J1 League	26	1	3	0	4	0	—		33	1
Júbilo Iwata	2001	J1 League	24	1	2	0	6	0	—		32	1
Júbilo Iwata	2002	J1 League	25	0	3	0	1	0	—		29	0
Júbilo Iwata	2003	J1 League	30	1	5	0	9	0	—		44	1
Júbilo Iwata	2004	J1 League	28	1	5	0	1	0	4	0	38	1
Júbilo Iwata	2005	J1 League	30	0	2	1	1	0	3	0	36	1
Júbilo Iwata	2006	J1 League	25	2	1	0	3	1	—		29	3
Júbilo Iwata	2007	J1 League	23	1	2	0	3	1	—		28	2
Júbilo Iwata	2008	J1 League	26	1	0	0	5	0	—		32	1
Júbilo Iwata	Total		353	10	29	1	54	2	7	0	443	13
Avispa Fukuoka	2009	J2 League	29	0	0	0	—		—		29	0
Avispa Fukuoka	2010	J2 League	29	2	1	0	—		—		30	2
Avispa Fukuoka	2011	J1 League	8	0	0	0	0	0	—		8	0
Avispa Fukuoka	Total		66	2	1	0	0	0	0	0	67	2
Total			419	12	30	1	54	2	7	0	510	15

=== International ===
Appearances and goals by national team and year
National team	Year	Apps	Goals
Japan	2004	14	0
Japan	2005	16	0
Japan	2006	2	0
Total		32	0

=== Managerial ===
As of 12 May 2024

Managerial record by team and tenure
Team	From	To	Record								Ref.
Team	From	To	P	W	D	L	GF	GA	GD	Win %	Ref.
Tochigi SC	25 February 2024	14 May 2024	16	3	3	10	11	32	−21	18.75	
Total			4	1	0	3	3	8	−5	25.00	

== National team ==
- 2004 Asian Cup (Champions)
- 2005 Confederations Cup

== Honors and awards ==
=== Individual ===
- J1 League Best Eleven: 1998, 2002

=== Club ===
Júbilo Iwata

- AFC Champions League: 1998–99
- Asian Super Cup: 1999
- J1 League: 1997, 1999, 2002
- Emperor's Cup: 2003
- J.League Cup: 1998
- Japanese Super Cup: 2000, 2003, 2004

=== International ===
Japan

- AFC Asian Cups: 2004
