= Toshihiro Hattori =

Japanese footballer

Toshihiro Hattori 服部 年宏
Personal information
- Date of birth: 23 September 1973 (age 53)
- Place of birth: Shizuoka, Japan
- Height: 1.78 m (5 ft 10 in)
- Positions: Midfielder; defender

Youth career
- 1989–1991: Tokai University Daiichi High School

College career
Years	Team	Apps	(Gls)
1992–1993	Tokai University		

Senior career*
Years	Team	Apps	(Gls)
1994–2006	Júbilo Iwata	350	(19)
2007–2009	Tokyo Verdy	104	(0)
2010–2011	Gainare Tottori	68	(3)
2012–2013	FC Gifu	77	(1)
Total		599	(23)

International career
1996	Japan U-23	3	(0)
1996–2003	Japan	44	(2)

Managerial career
- 2021: Júbilo Iwata (caretaker)
- 2022–2023: Fukushima United
- 2024: FC Imabari
Medal record
Men's football
Representing Japan
AFC Asian Cup
Winner	2000 Lebanon
FIFA Confederations Cup
Runner-up	2001 Korea/Japan
- * Club domestic league appearances and goals

Toshihiro Hattori (服部 年宏, Hattori Toshihiro; born 23 September 1973) is a Japanese professional manager and former footballer who played as a midfielder or defender. He last played for the Japan national team until 2003. He last manager of FC Imabari for 2024 season.

== Club career ==
Hattori was born in Shizuoka on 23 September 1973. After he dropped out from Tokai University, he joined Júbilo Iwata in 1994. He played in many defensive positions. He was a central player in golden era in club history. The club won the champions at J1 League three times (1999, 1999, 2002). The club also won 1998 J.League Cup and 2003 Emperor's Cup. In Asia, the club won the 1998–99 Asian Club Championship and came second place at 1999–2000 and 2000–01 Asian Club Championship. He played the club until 2006. Toward end of his career, he played for Tokyo Verdy (2007–09), Gainare Tottori (2010–11) and FC Gifu (2012–13). He retired end of 2013 season.

== International career ==
In July 1996, Hattori was selected Japan U23 national team for 1996 Summer Olympics. He played in all three matches. Although Japan won two matches, Japan lost at First round. At this time, Japan won Brazil in first game. It was known as "Miracle of Miami" (マイアミの奇跡) in Japan.

On 11 September 1996, Hattori debuted for Japan national team against Uzbekistan. He was selected Japan for 1996 Asian Cup and 1998 World Cup, but he did not play in the match both competition. After 1998 World Cup, he came to be well selected for Japan by new manager Philippe Troussier. He played at 1999 Copa América, 2000 Asian Cup, 2001 Confederations Cup and 2002 World Cup. At 2000 Asian Cup, he played in all matches and Japan won the champions. At 2001 Confederations Cup, Japan won 2nd place. After 2002 World Cup, he played as regular player under new manager Zico. He was also selected Japan for 2003 Confederations Cup, but he did not play in the match. He played 44 games and scored 2 goals for Japan until 2003.

== Managerial career ==
On 16 December 2013, he was appointed head of the training department of his former club, Júbilo Iwata. At the end of 2014, he received the J. League Meritorious Player Award.

In June 2016, he was appointed director of the Shizuoka Football Association. In September of the same year, he was certified as a JFA certified S-class coach.

In October 2020, Hattori was appointed assistant manager of Júbilo Iwata. Hattori served as manager in the 2021 season, but in October of the same year, manager Masakazu Suzuki was hospitalized due to poor health, so he was suddenly put in charge as caretaker manager. Manager Suzuki returned during the season. He returned to manager.

On 25 December 2021, Hattori leave from Júbilo Iwata. Hattori was then appointed manager of Fukushima United.

In the 2023 season, Fukushima United was ranked 18th at the end of 17th round and his left from the club was announced on 12 July of same year.

On 11 December 2023, Hattori was officially announced as manager of FC Imabari from the 2024 season. On 10 November 2024, Hattori secured promotion to the J2 League for the first time in the club's history from next season after defeating Gainare Tottori 0-5 in Matchweek 36. Hattori left the club at end of the 2024 season.

== Career statistics ==
=== Club ===
Appearances and goals by club, season and competition
Club	Season	League			Emperor's Cup		J.League Cup		ACL		Total	
Club	Season	Division	Apps	Goals	Apps	Goals	Apps	Goals	Apps	Goals	Apps	Goals
Júbilo Iwata	1994	J. League	25	0	1	0	4	0	–		30	0
Júbilo Iwata	1995	J. League	40	3	2	1	–		–		42	4
Júbilo Iwata	1996	J. League	15	3	1	0	11	1	–		27	4
Júbilo Iwata	1997	J. League	18	2	4	0	4	0	–		26	2
Júbilo Iwata	1998	J. League	32	1	3	0	2	0	–		37	1
Júbilo Iwata	1999	J. League Div 1	29	0	3	0	4	0	–		36	0
Júbilo Iwata	2000	J. League Div 1	25	2	3	1	1	1	–		29	4
Júbilo Iwata	2001	J. League Div 1	27	5	1	0	9	0	–		37	5
Júbilo Iwata	2002	J. League Div 1	26	2	0	0	1	0	–		27	2
Júbilo Iwata	2003	J. League Div 1	26	1	4	0	8	0	–		38	1
Júbilo Iwata	2004	J. League Div 1	29	0	5	0	5	1	4	1	43	2
Júbilo Iwata	2005	J. League Div 1	28	0	2	0	2	0	3	0	35	0
Júbilo Iwata	2006	J. League Div 1	30	0	2	0	7	0	–		39	0
Tokyo Verdy	2007	J. League Div 2	47	0	0	0	–		–		47	0
Tokyo Verdy	2008	J. League Div 1	31	0	1	0	4	0	–		36	0
Tokyo Verdy	2009	J. League Div 2	26	0	1	0	–		–		27	0
Gainare Tottori	2010	Football League	33	3	1	0	–		–		34	4
Gainare Tottori	2011	J. League Div 2	35	0	2	0	0	0	–		37	0
FC Gifu	2012	J. League Div 2	42	1	0	0	–		–		42	1
FC Gifu	2013	J. League Div 2	35	0	1	0	–		–		36	0
Career total			599	23	36	2	62	3	7	1	704	29

=== International ===
Appearances and goals by national team and year
National team	Year	Apps	Goals
Japan	1996	1	0
Japan	1997	1	0
Japan	1998	5	0
Japan	1999	5	0
Japan	2000	12	1
Japan	2001	11	1
Japan	2002	5	0
Japan	2003	4	0
Total		44	2

Scores and results list Japan's goal tally first, score column indicates score after each Hattori goal.

List of international goals scored by Toshihiro Hattori
No.	Date	Venue	Opponent	Score	Result	Competition
1	20 December 2000	National Stadium, Tokyo, Japan	South Korea		1–1	Friendly
2	15 August 2001	Shizuoka Stadium, Fukuroi, Japan	Australia		3–0	AFC/OFC Cup Challenge

== Managerial statistics ==
As of the end 2024 season.

Team	From	To	Record				
Team	From	To	G	W	D	L	Win %
Fukushima United	2022	2023	55	17	12	26	30.91
FC Imabari	2024		40	22	7	11	55.00
Total			95	39	19	37	41.05

== Honours ==
=== Player ===
Júbilo Iwata

- AFC Champions League: 1999
- Asian Super Cup: 1999
- J. League Division 1: 1997, 1999, 2002
- Emperor's Cup: 2003
- J.League Cup: 1998
- Japanese Super Cup: 2000, 2003, 2004

Japan

- FIFA Confederations Cup runner-up: 2001
- AFC Asian Cup: 2000

Individual

- J.League Best Eleven: 2001

=== Manager ===
FC Imabari

- J3 League runner-up: 2024
