= Toshiya Fujita (footballer) =

Japanese footballer (born 1971)

Toshiya Fujita 藤田 俊哉
Personal information
- Date of birth: October 4, 1971 (age 55)
- Place of birth: Shizuoka, Shizuoka, Japan
- Height: 1.74 m (5 ft 9 in)
- Position: Midfielder

Youth career
- 1987–1989: Shimizu Shogyo High School

College career
Years	Team	Apps	(Gls)
1990–1993	University of Tsukuba		

Senior career*
Years	Team	Apps	(Gls)
1994–2005	Júbilo Iwata	336	(94)
2003	→ Utrecht (loan)	14	(1)
2005–2008	Nagoya Grampus	83	(6)
2009–2010	Roasso Kumamoto	75	(6)
2011	JEF United Chiba	4	(0)
Total		512	(107)

International career
1995–2005	Japan	24	(3)

Managerial career
- 2014–2017: VVV-Venlo (Coach)
- 2017–2018: Leeds United (Head of Football Development (Asia))
Medal record
Júbilo Iwata
Winner	J1 League	1997
Winner	J1 League	1999
Winner	J1 League	2002
Runner-up	J1 League	1998
Runner-up	J1 League	2001
Runner-up	J1 League	2003
Winner	J.League Cup	1998
Runner-up	J.League Cup	1994
Runner-up	J.League Cup	1997
Runner-up	J.League Cup	2001
Winner	Emperor's Cup	2003
Runner-up	Emperor's Cup	2004
Representing Japan
FIFA Confederations Cup
Silver medal – second place	2001 Korea-Japan
AFC Asian Cup
Gold medal – first place	2004 China
- * Club domestic league appearances and goals

Toshiya Fujita (藤田 俊哉, Fujita Toshiya; born October 4, 1971) is a Japanese former professional footballer who played as a midfielder.

Fujita played for Júbilo Iwata, Utrecht, Nagoya Grampus, Roasso Kumamoto and JEF United Chiba. He won five major titles during his time at Júbilo. He also gained 24 caps for the Japan national team between 1995 and 2005.

From 2017 to 2018, he held the position of Head of Football Development (Asia) for English club Leeds United.

== Club career ==
Fujita attended and played football at Shimizu Commercial High School and University of Tsukuba before joining Júbilo Iwata in 1994. Playing as a creative midfielder, Fujita has played an integral role in helping to build Júbilo Iwata into one of the most successful franchises in the J1 League.

Although Fujita is not as well known as some of his more illustrious teammates, this probably has more to do with his low-key manner and quiet efficiency rather than a lack of skills. As part of the Júbilo midfield, Fujita had an essential role in providing the transition from defense to attack. In 1999, his contributions to his team were recognized as he was made team captain and won the league MVP award.

Fujita joined FC Utrecht, a team of the Eredivisie, on loan in mid-2003. The team was unable to match the performances of the top-tier teams in the Netherlands. As a result, FC Utrecht were unwilling to pay the transfer fee required to keep Fujita and he returned to Japan to once again play for Júbilo Iwata at the end of 2003.

From 2004, Fujita played for Júbilo Iwata again. However, his opportunity to play decreased in 2005, he moved to Nagoya Grampus Eight (later Nagoya Grampus) in June 2005. His opportunity to play decreased in 2008 and he left the club end of the season. From 2009, he played for J2 League club Roasso Kumamoto (2009–10) and JEF United Chiba (2011). He announced his retirement in June 2012.

== International career ==
On February 15, 1995, Fujita debuted for the Japan national team against Australia. In June 1999, he was selected by Japan for the first time in four years by manager Philippe Troussier. He played at 1999 Copa America. In 2001, he was selected by Japan for the 2001 FIFA Confederations Cup. He did not play in the match while Japan came second place.

In October 2003, he was selected Japan for the first time in four years by manager Zico. In 2004, he played in the 2006 FIFA World Cup qualification. He was also selected by Japan for the 2004 Asian Cup. While he did not play in the match, Japan won the title twice in a row. He played 24 games and scored 3 goals for Japan until 2005.

== Japan Pro-Footballers Association (JPFA) ==
Fujita had been managing the Japan Pro-Footballers Association as a chairman for five years with Tetsuro Kiyooka, FIFA players' agent as a chief operating officer and formed the organization as a trade union in 2011 as well as represented the all Japanese footballers and the Japan national football team to protect their rights and status.

== Coaching career ==
In 2014 joined Dutch side VVV-Venlo as part of the coaching staff.

On July 21, 2017, it was announced he had left VVV-Venlo join English EFL Championship side Leeds United as Head of Football Development (Asia). On January 3, 2018, Leeds signed their first ever Japanese player, signing Japanese international Yosuke Ideguchi from Gamba Osaka. In late 2018, Fujita left his role with Leeds United to become head of international relations with the Japanese Football Federation.

== Career statistics ==
=== Club ===
Appearances and goals by club, season and competition
Club	Season	League			National cup		League cup		Continental		Total	
Club	Season	Division	Apps	Goals	Apps	Goals	Apps	Goals	Apps	Goals	Apps	Goals
Júbilo Iwata	1994	J1 League	38	7	1	0	4	0	–		43	7
Júbilo Iwata	1995	J1 League	49	11	1	1	–		–		50	12
Júbilo Iwata	1996	J1 League	25	4	1	0	14	1	–		40	5
Júbilo Iwata	1997	J1 League	24	9	4	3	6	0	–		34	12
Júbilo Iwata	1998	J1 League	33	17	3	0	6	4	–		42	21
Júbilo Iwata	1999	J1 League	29	4	3	0	4	1	–		36	5
Júbilo Iwata	2000	J1 League	30	8	3	1	4	1	–		37	10
Júbilo Iwata	2001	J1 League	26	11	2	1	7	0	–		35	12
Júbilo Iwata	2002	J1 League	30	10	3	0	7	2	–		40	12
Júbilo Iwata	2003	J1 League	13	6	0	0	6	0	–		19	6
Júbilo Iwata	2004	J1 League	29	7	5	1	0	0	4	0	38	8
Júbilo Iwata	2005	J1 League	10	0	0	0	0	0	4	1	14	1
Utrecht (loan)	2003–04	Eredivisie	14	1	–		–		3	0	17	1
Nagoya Grampus (Note: "Nagoya Grampus Eight" until 2008)	2005	J1 League	22	2	2	0	0	0	–		24	2
Nagoya Grampus	2006	J1 League	24	2	2	0	4	0	–		30	2
Nagoya Grampus	2007	J1 League	29	2	2	0	1	0	–		32	2
Nagoya Grampus	2008	J1 League	8	0	1	0	4	1	–		13	1
Roasso Kumamoto	2009	J2 League	50	4	1	0	–		–		51	4
Roasso Kumamoto	2010	J2 League	25	2	0	0	–		–		25	2
JEF United Chiba	2011	J2 League	4	0	1	0	–		–		5	0
Career total			512	107	34	7	67	10	11	1	625	123

=== International ===
Appearances and goals by national team and year
National team	Year	Apps	Goals
Japan	1995	6	2
Japan	1996	0	0
Japan	1997	0	0
Japan	1998	0	0
Japan	1999	4	0
Japan	2000	0	0
Japan	2001	0	0
Japan	2002	0	0
Japan	2003	3	0
Japan	2004	10	1
Japan	2005	1	0
Total		24	3

Scores and results list Japan's goal tally first, score column indicates score after each Fujita goal.

List of international goals scored by Toshiya Fujita
No.	Date	Venue	Opponent	Score	Result	Competition
1	February 23, 1995	Hong Kong, China	China	1–0	2–1	Friendly
2	June 10, 1995	Nottingham, England	Sweden	1–0	2–2	Umbro Cup
3	March 31, 2004	Jalan Besar, Singapore	Singapore	2–1	2–1	2006 FIFA World Cup qualification

== Honors ==
Júbilo Iwata

- J1 League: 1997, 1999, 2002
- J.League Cup: 1998
- Japanese Super Cup: 2000, 2003, 2004
- Asian Club Championship: 1998–99
- Asian Super Cup: 1999

Japan

- FIFA Confederations Cup: runner-up 2001
- AFC Asian Cup: 2004

Individual

- J.League Most Valuable Player: 2001
- J.League Best XI: 1998, 2001, 2002
- Japanese Footballer of the Year: 2002
