= Hideto Suzuki =

Japanese footballer and manager

Hideto Suzuki 鈴木 秀人
Personal information
- Full name: Hideto Suzuki
- Date of birth: 7 October 1974 (age 52)
- Place of birth: Hamamatsu, Shizuoka, Japan
- Height: 1.80 m (5 ft 11 in)
- Position: Defender

Youth career
- 1990–1992: Hamamatsu Shogyo High School

Senior career*
Years	Team	Apps	(Gls)
1993–2009	Júbilo Iwata	328	(9)
Total		328	(9)

International career
1996	Japan U-23	3	(0)
1997	Japan	1	(0)

Managerial career
- 2019: Júbilo Iwata
- 2025: Azul Claro Numazu
Medal record
Júbilo Iwata
Winner	J1 League	1997
Winner	J1 League	1999
Winner	J1 League	2002
Runner-up	J1 League	1998
Runner-up	J1 League	2001
Runner-up	J1 League	2003
Winner	J.League Cup	1998
Runner-up	J.League Cup	1994
Runner-up	J.League Cup	1997
Runner-up	J.League Cup	2001
Winner	Emperor's Cup	2003
Runner-up	Emperor's Cup	2004
- * Club domestic league appearances and goals

Hideto Suzuki (鈴木 秀人, Suzuki Hideto; born 7 October 1974) is a former Japanese football player and manager. He played for Japan national team.

== Club career ==
Suzuki was born in Hamamatsu on 7 October 1974. After graduating from high school, he joined Japan Football League club Yamaha Motors (later Júbilo Iwata) in 1993. Although he did not play in the match, the club won the 2nd place in 1993 and was promoted to J1 League. He debuted in 1995 and he became a regular player. He was a central player in golden era in club history. The club won the champions at J1 League 3 times (1999, 1999, 2002). The club also won 1998 J.League Cup and 2003 Emperor's Cup. In Asia, the club won the champions at 1998–99 Asian Club Championship and 2nd place at 1999–00 and 2000–01 Asian Club Championship. From the late 2000s, his opportunity to play decreased. He retired at the end of the 2009 season. He played 328 games and scored 9 goals in the league.

== National team career ==
In July 1996, Suzuki was selected Japan U-23 national team for 1996 Summer Olympics and he played all 3 matches. Although Japan won 2 matches, Japan lost at First round. At this time, Japan won Brazil in first game. It was known as "Miracle of Miami" (マイアミの奇跡) in Japan.

In June 1997, Suzuki was selected Japan national team for 1998 World Cup qualification. At this qualification, on 28 June, he debuted against Oman. He was also selected Japan for 1999 Copa América, but he did not play in the match.

== Coaching career ==
After retirement, Suzuki started coaching career at Júbilo Iwata in 2010. He served as a coach for youth team from 2010. In 2014, he became an assistant coach for top team. On 1 July 2019, he became a manager for top team as Hiroshi Nanami successor. However he resigned for health reasons on 15 August.

== Career statistics ==
Club performance			League		Cup		League Cup		Continental		Total	
Season	Club	League	Apps	Goals	Apps	Goals	Apps	Goals	Apps	Goals	Apps	Goals
Japan			League		Emperor's Cup		J.League Cup		Asia		Total	
1993	Yamaha Motors	Football League	0	0	0	0	0	0	-		0	0
1994	Júbilo Iwata	J1 League	0	0	0	0	0	0	-		0	0
1995	Júbilo Iwata	J1 League	31	0	2	0	-		-		33	0
1996	Júbilo Iwata	J1 League	21	1	1	0	10	0	-		32	1
1997	Júbilo Iwata	J1 League	24	0	4	0	6	0	-		34	0
1998	Júbilo Iwata	J1 League	20	1	0	0	4	0	-		24	1
1999	Júbilo Iwata	J1 League	28	3	3	0	3	0	-		34	3
2000	Júbilo Iwata	J1 League	29	0	3	0	4	0	-		36	0
2001	Júbilo Iwata	J1 League	27	0	1	0	8	0	-		36	0
2002	Júbilo Iwata	J1 League	27	0	1	0	8	0	-		36	0
2003	Júbilo Iwata	J1 League	29	0	5	0	9	0	-		43	0
2004	Júbilo Iwata	J1 League	28	1	3	0	5	0	5	0	41	1
2005	Júbilo Iwata	J1 League	12	0	3	0	1	0	2	0	18	0
2006	Júbilo Iwata	J1 League	27	2	2	0	6	0	-		35	2
2007	Júbilo Iwata	J1 League	11	1	1	0	3	0	-		15	1
2008	Júbilo Iwata	J1 League	8	0	1	0	3	0	-		12	0
2009	Júbilo Iwata	J1 League	6	0	1	0	0	0	-		7	0
Total			328	9	31	0	70	0	7	0	436	9

== National team statistics ==
Japan national team
Year	Apps	Goals
1997	1	0
Total	1	0

== Managerial statistics ==
Team	From	To	Record				
Team	From	To	G	W	D	L	Win %
Júbilo Iwata	2019	2019	5	1	0	4	20.00
Total			5	1	0	4	20.00

== Honors and awards ==
=== Individual honors ===
- J1 League Best Eleven: 2002

=== Team honors ===
- AFC Champions League Champions: 1999
- Asian Super Cup Champions: 1999
- J1 League Champions: 1997, 1999, 2002
- Emperor's Cup Champions: 2003
- Japanese Super Cup Champions: 2000, 2003, 2004
