= Tomoaki Ōgami =

Japanese footballer

Tomoaki Ogami 大神 友明
Personal information
- Full name: Tomoaki Ogami
- Date of birth: June 7, 1970 (age 56)
- Place of birth: Hiroshima, Japan
- Height: 1.82 m (5 ft 11 1/2 in)
- Position: Goalkeeper

Youth career
- 1986–1988: Hiroshima Kokutaiji High School

College career
Years	Team	Apps	(Gls)
1989–1992	University of Tsukuba		

Senior career*
Years	Team	Apps	(Gls)
1993–2001	Júbilo Iwata	110	(0)
2002–2004	Avispa Fukuoka	38	(0)
Total		148	(0)
Medal record
Júbilo Iwata
Winner	J1 League	1997
Winner	J1 League	1999
Runner-up	J1 League	1998
Runner-up	J1 League	2001
Winner	J.League Cup	1998
Runner-up	J.League Cup	1994
Runner-up	J.League Cup	1997
Runner-up	J.League Cup	2001
- * Club domestic league appearances and goals

Tomoaki Ogami (大神 友明, Ōgami Tomoaki; born June 7, 1970) is a Japanese former footballer.

== Playing career ==
Ogami was born in Hiroshima on June 7, 1970. After graduating from the University of Tsukuba, he joined Yamaha Motors (later Júbilo Iwata) in 1993. He was third choice behind Shinichi Morishita and Dido Havenaar. In 1996, he became a starting goalkeeper. In 1997 and 1998, he played in all matches and he was selected for the Best Eleven in 1997. The club also won the 1997 J1 League and 1998 J.League Cup. In April 1999, the club won the 1998–99 Asian Club Championship, the first Asian title in the club history. He lost his place in the side due to injury in late 1999, and was third choice behind Yushi Ozaki and Arno van Zwam. In 2002, he moved to Avispa Fukuoka, where he was the starting goalkeeper. However, he lost his place in the side and was third choice behind Hideki Tsukamoto and Yuichi Mizutani. He retired at the end of the 2004 season.

== Career statistics ==
Appearances and goals by club, season and competition
Club	Season	League			Emperor's Cup		J.League Cup		Total	
Club	Season	Division	Apps	Goals	Apps	Goals	Apps	Goals	Apps	Goals
Yamaha Motors	1993	Football League	0	0	0	0	—		0	0
Júbilo Iwata	1994	J1 League	4	0	0	0	0	0	4	0
Júbilo Iwata	1995	J1 League	0	0	0	0	—		0	0
Júbilo Iwata	1996	J1 League	15	0	0	0	0	0	15	0
Júbilo Iwata	1997	J1 League	32	0	4	0	12	0	48	0
Júbilo Iwata	1998	J1 League	34	0	3	0	6	0	43	0
Júbilo Iwata	1999	J1 League	20	0	0	0	0	0	20	0
Júbilo Iwata	2000	J1 League	2	0	0	0	0	0	2	0
Júbilo Iwata	2001	J1 League	3	0	0	0	1	0	4	0
Avispa Fukuoka	2002	J2 League	38	0	0	0	—		38	0
Avispa Fukuoka	2003	J2 League	0	0	0	0	—		0	0
Avispa Fukuoka	2004	J2 League	0	0	0	0	—		0	0
Career total			148	0	7	0	19	0	174	0

== Honours ==
=== Club ===
Júbilo Iwata

- AFC Champions League: 1998–99
- Asian Super Cup: 1999
- J1 League: 1997, 1999
- J.League Cup: 1998
- Japanese Super Cup: 2000

=== Individual ===
- J.League Best XI - 1997
