= Hiroki Kobayashi =

Japanese footballer

Hiroki Kobayashi 小林 弘記
Personal information
- Full name: Hiroki Kobayashi
- Date of birth: May 24, 1977 (age 49)
- Place of birth: Shizuoka, Japan
- Height: 1.85 m (6 ft 1 in)
- Position: Goalkeeper

Youth career
- 1993–1995: Shimizu Commercial High School

Senior career*
Years	Team	Apps	(Gls)
1996–2000	Júbilo Iwata	0	(0)
2000	Verdy Kawasaki	0	(0)
2000–2001	Consadole Sapporo	3	(0)
2002	FC Tokyo	0	(0)
2003–2006	Shonan Bellmare	79	(0)
2007–2009	Roasso Kumamoto	62	(0)
Total		144	(0)
Medal record
Júbilo Iwata
Winner	J1 League	1997
Winner	J1 League	1999
Runner-up	J1 League	1998
Winner	J.League Cup	1998
Runner-up	J.League Cup	1997
- * Club domestic league appearances and goals

Hiroki Kobayashi (小林 弘記, Kobayashi Hiroki; born May 24, 1977) is a former Japanese football player.

== Playing career ==
Kobayashi was born in Shizuoka on . After graduating from Shimizu Commercial High School, he joined the J1 League club Júbilo Iwata in 1996. However he did not play at all, less than either Tomoaki Ogami or Yushi Ozaki. In April 2000, he moved to Verdy Kawasaki. However he did not play much there wither, less than Kenji Honnami. In June 2000, he moved to Consadole Sapporo. Although he played in the last three matches of the 2000 season, he played less than Yohei Sato. In 2002, he moved to FC Tokyo. However he still did not play much, less than Yoichi Doi. In 2003, he moved to Shonan Bellmare. He battled with Masahito Suzuki for a position and he played often. In 2005, he became a regular goalkeeper. However gradually played less often, in favor of new member Tomohiko Ito in 2006. In 2007, he moved to the Japan Football League club Rosso Kumamoto (later Roasso Kumamoto). He became a regular goalkeeper and played in all matches during the 2007 season. The club was promoted to the J2 League in 2008. However his opportunity to play decreased after that, and he retired at the end of the 2009 season.

== Club statistics ==
Club performance			League		Cup		League Cup		Total	
Season	Club	League	Apps	Goals	Apps	Goals	Apps	Goals	Apps	Goals
Japan			League		Emperor's Cup		J.League Cup		Total	
1996	Júbilo Iwata	J1 League	0	0	0	0	0	0	0	0
1997	Júbilo Iwata	J1 League	0	0	0	0	0	0	0	0
1998	Júbilo Iwata	J1 League	0	0	0	0	0	0	0	0
1999	Júbilo Iwata	J1 League	0	0	0	0	0	0	0	0
2000	Júbilo Iwata	J1 League	0	0	0	0	0	0	0	0
2000	Verdy Kawasaki	J1 League	0	0	0	0	0	0	0	0
2000	Consadole Sapporo	J2 League	3	0	0	0	0	0	3	0
2001	Consadole Sapporo	J1 League	0	0	0	0	0	0	0	0
2002	FC Tokyo	J1 League	0	0	0	0	0	0	0	0
2003	Shonan Bellmare	J2 League	21	0	0	0	-		21	0
2004	Shonan Bellmare	J2 League	9	0	0	0	-		9	0
2005	Shonan Bellmare	J2 League	39	0	1	0	-		40	0
2006	Shonan Bellmare	J2 League	10	0	0	0	-		10	0
2007	Rosso Kumamoto	Football League	34	0	0	0	-		34	0
2008	Roasso Kumamoto	J2 League	18	0	0	0	-		18	0
2009	Roasso Kumamoto	J2 League	10	0	1	0	-		11	0
Total			144	0	2	0	0	0	146	0
