= 1998 Júbilo Iwata season =

Júbilo Iwata
1998 season
- Manager: Valmir
- Stadium: Júbilo Iwata Stadium
- J.League: Runners-up
- Emperor's Cup: Quarterfinals
- J.League Cup: Champions
- Top goalscorer: Masashi Nakayama (36)
Home colours	Away colours

1998 Júbilo Iwata season

== Competitions ==
Competitions	Position
J.League	2nd / 18 clubs
Emperor's Cup	Quarterfinals
J.League Cup	Champions

== Domestic results ==
=== J.League ===
21 March 1998 1-1	Júbilo Iwata	2-0	Kyoto Purple Sanga	Júbilo Iwata Stadium
JST (UTC+09)

25 March 1998 1-2	Verdy Kawasaki	1-0	Júbilo Iwata	Tokyo National Stadium
JST (UTC+09)

28 March 1998 1-3	Júbilo Iwata	4-3	Vissel Kobe	Júbilo Iwata Stadium
JST (UTC+09)

4 April 1998 1-4	JEF United Ichihara	3-1	Júbilo Iwata	Ichihara Seaside Stadium
JST (UTC+09)

11 April 1998 1-5	Júbilo Iwata	4-0	Yokohama Flügels	Júbilo Iwata Stadium
JST (UTC+09)

15 April 1998 1-6	Cerezo Osaka	1-9	Júbilo Iwata	Osaka Nagai Stadium
JST (UTC+09)

18 April 1998 1-7	Júbilo Iwata	5-0	Sanfrecce Hiroshima	Júbilo Iwata Stadium
JST (UTC+09)

25 April 1998 1-8	Avispa Fukuoka	1-7	Júbilo Iwata	Suizenji Stadium
JST (UTC+09)

29 April 1998 1-9	Júbilo Iwata	4-0	Consadole Sapporo	Júbilo Iwata Stadium
JST (UTC+09)

2 May 1998 1-10	Shimizu S-Pulse	2-1	Júbilo Iwata	Nihondaira Sports Stadium
JST (UTC+09)

5 May 1998 1-11	Júbilo Iwata	0-3	Kashima Antlers	Júbilo Iwata Stadium
JST (UTC+09)

9 May 1998 1-12	Kashiwa Reysol	1-3	Júbilo Iwata	Hitachi Kashiwa Soccer Stadium
JST (UTC+09)

25 July 1998 1-13	Júbilo Iwata	4-1	Gamba Osaka	Júbilo Iwata Stadium
JST (UTC+09)

29 July 1998 1-14	Yokohama Marinos	0-1	Júbilo Iwata	Yamagata Park Stadium
JST (UTC+09)

1 August 1998 1-15	Júbilo Iwata	2-0	Urawa Red Diamonds	Júbilo Iwata Stadium
JST (UTC+09)

5 August 1998 1-16	Nagoya Grampus Eight	1-2	Júbilo Iwata	Mizuho Athletic Stadium
JST (UTC+09)

8 August 1998 1-17	Júbilo Iwata	3-1	Bellmare Hiratsuka	Júbilo Iwata Stadium
JST (UTC+09)

22 August 1998 2-1	Júbilo Iwata	2-3 (GG) (a.e.t.)	Yokohama Marinos	Júbilo Iwata Stadium
JST (UTC+09)

29 August 1998 2-2	Urawa Red Diamonds	2-0	Júbilo Iwata	Urawa Komaba Stadium
JST (UTC+09)

5 September 1998 2-3	Júbilo Iwata	4-2	Nagoya Grampus Eight	Júbilo Iwata Stadium
JST (UTC+09)

12 September 1998 2-4	Bellmare Hiratsuka	1-2	Júbilo Iwata	Hiratsuka Athletics Stadium
JST (UTC+09)

15 September 1998 2-5	Kyoto Purple Sanga	2-3	Júbilo Iwata	Tottori Soccer Stadium
JST (UTC+09)

19 September 1998 2-6	Júbilo Iwata	1-0	Verdy Kawasaki	Júbilo Iwata Stadium
JST (UTC+09)

23 September 1998 2-7	Vissel Kobe	0-7	Júbilo Iwata	Kobe Universiade Memorial Stadium
JST (UTC+09)

26 September 1998 2-8	Júbilo Iwata	6-2	JEF United Ichihara	Júbilo Iwata Stadium
JST (UTC+09)

3 October 1998 2-9	Yokohama Flügels	0-4	Júbilo Iwata	Yokohama Mitsuzawa Stadium
JST (UTC+09)

14 October 1998 2-10	Júbilo Iwata	3-0	Cerezo Osaka	Júbilo Iwata Stadium
JST (UTC+09)

17 October 1998 2-11	Sanfrecce Hiroshima	2-1	Júbilo Iwata	Hiroshima Big Arch
JST (UTC+09)

21 October 1998 2-12	Júbilo Iwata	6-1	Avispa Fukuoka	Júbilo Iwata Stadium
JST (UTC+09)

24 October 1998 2-13	Consadole Sapporo	1-6	Júbilo Iwata	Sapporo Atsubetsu Park Stadium
JST (UTC+09)

31 October 1998 2-14	Júbilo Iwata	1-0	Shimizu S-Pulse	Júbilo Iwata Stadium
JST (UTC+09)

3 November 1998 2-15	Kashima Antlers	1-0	Júbilo Iwata	Kashima Soccer Stadium
JST (UTC+09)

7 November 1998 2-16	Júbilo Iwata	4-0	Kashiwa Reysol	Júbilo Iwata Stadium
JST (UTC+09)

14 November 1998 2-17	Gamba Osaka	4-5	Júbilo Iwata	Osaka Expo '70 Stadium
JST (UTC+09)

=== Emperor's Cup ===
1st Round	bye

2nd Round	bye

13 December 1998 3rd Round	Júbilo Iwata	2-0	Omiya Ardija	Júbilo Iwata Stadium
JST (UTC+09)

20 December 1998 4th Round	Júbilo Iwata	3-2	Consadole Sapporo	Gunma Shikishima Stadium
JST (UTC+09)

23 December 1998 Quarterfinals	Júbilo Iwata	1-2	Yokohama Flügels	Kobe Universiade Memorial Stadium
JST (UTC+09)

=== J.League Cup ===
16 May 1998 GL-A-1	Júbilo Iwata	1-2	Urawa Red Diamonds	Niigata City Athletic Stadium
JST (UTC+09)

GL-A-2	bye

30 May 1998 GL-A-3	Verdy Kawasaki	1-2	Júbilo Iwata	Tokyo National Stadium
JST (UTC+09)

3 June 1998 GL-A-4	Brummel Sendai	2-6	Júbilo Iwata	Sendai Stadium
JST (UTC+09)

6 June 1998 GL-A-5	Júbilo Iwata	3-0	Sanfrecce Hiroshima	Júbilo Iwata Stadium
JST (UTC+09)

15 July 1998 Semifinals	Shimizu S-Pulse	0-2	Júbilo Iwata	Nihondaira Sports Stadium
JST (UTC+09)

19 July 1998 Final	Júbilo Iwata	4-0	JEF United Ichihara	Tokyo National Stadium
JST (UTC+09)		J. League

== Player statistics ==
No.	Pos.	Nat.	Player	D.o.B. (Age)	Height / Weight	J.League		Emperor's Cup		J.League Cup		Total	
No.	Pos.	Nat.	Player	D.o.B. (Age)	Height / Weight	Apps	Goals	Apps	Goals	Apps	Goals	Apps	Goals
1	GK	(Japan)	Yushi Ozaki	March 24, 1969 (aged 28)	cm / kg	0	0						
2	DF	(Japan)	Hideto Suzuki	October 7, 1974 (aged 23)	cm / kg	20	1						
3	DF	(Japan)	Masahiro Endo	August 15, 1970 (aged 27)	cm / kg	6	0						
4	DF	(Brazil)	Adílson Batista	March 16, 1968 (aged 30)	cm / kg	23	5						
5	DF	(Japan)	Makoto Tanaka	August 8, 1975 (aged 22)	cm / kg	32	2						
6	MF	(Japan)	Toshihiro Hattori	September 23, 1973 (aged 24)	cm / kg	32	1						
7	MF	(Japan)	Hiroshi Nanami	November 28, 1972 (aged 25)	cm / kg	33	7						
8	MF	(Brazil)	Dunga	October 31, 1963 (aged 34)	cm / kg	28	6						
9	FW	(Japan)	Masashi Nakayama	September 23, 1967 (aged 30)	cm / kg	27	36						
10	MF	(Japan)	Toshiya Fujita	October 4, 1971 (aged 26)	cm / kg	33	17						
11	FW	(Brazil)	Alessandro Oliveira	May 27, 1973 (aged 24)	cm / kg	9	3						
11	DF	(Brazil)	Dedimar	January 27, 1976 (aged 22)	cm / kg	4	1						
12	GK	(Japan)	Tomoaki Ōgami	June 7, 1970 (aged 27)	cm / kg	34	0						
13	FW	(Japan)	Nobuo Kawaguchi	April 10, 1975 (aged 22)	cm / kg	20	3						
14	DF	(Japan)	Takahiro Yamanishi	April 2, 1976 (aged 21)	cm / kg	13	0						
15	MF	(Japan)	Akira Konno	September 12, 1974 (aged 23)	cm / kg	4	0						
16	GK	(Japan)	Hiroki Kobayashi	May 24, 1977 (aged 20)	cm / kg	0	0						
17	DF	(Japan)	Yoshiro Moriyama	November 9, 1967 (aged 30)	cm / kg	0	0						
18	FW	(Japan)	Norihisa Shimizu	October 4, 1976 (aged 21)	cm / kg	4	1						
19	FW	(Japan)	Naohiro Takahara	June 4, 1979 (aged 18)	cm / kg	20	5						
20	MF	(Japan)	Kiyokazu Kudo	June 21, 1974 (aged 23)	cm / kg	9	0						
21	GK	(Japan)	Hiromasa Yamamoto	June 5, 1979 (aged 18)	cm / kg	0	0						
22	DF	(Japan)	Kensuke Tsukuda	June 28, 1977 (aged 20)	cm / kg	0	0						
23	MF	(Japan)	Takashi Fukunishi	September 1, 1976 (aged 21)	cm / kg	22	2						
24	MF	(Japan)	Koji Sakamoto	December 3, 1978 (aged 19)	cm / kg	0	0						
25	DF	(Japan)	Yasushi Kita	April 25, 1978 (aged 19)	cm / kg	7	0						
26	FW	(Japan)	Yoshika Matsubara	August 19, 1974 (aged 23)	cm / kg	0	0						
27	MF	(Japan)	Ryuji Ishino	June 3, 1978 (aged 19)	cm / kg	0	0						
28	DF	(Japan)	Takuma Koga	April 30, 1969 (aged 28)	cm / kg	30	2						
29	MF	(Japan)	Daisuke Oku	February 7, 1976 (aged 22)	cm / kg	32	12						
30	MF	(Japan)	Kazuki Kuranuki	November 10, 1978 (aged 19)	cm / kg	0	0						
31	MF	(Japan)	Takahiro Kawamura	October 4, 1979 (aged 18)	cm / kg	0	0						
32	FW	(Japan)	Shinya Hoshido	October 4, 1978 (aged 19)	cm / kg	0	0						
33	DF	(Japan)	Hideyuki Taizawa	May 2, 1979 (aged 18)	cm / kg	0	0						
34	DF	(Japan)	Tomoki Yamada	July 13, 1979 (aged 18)	cm / kg	0	0						
35	MF	(Japan)	Ken Fujita	August 27, 1979 (aged 18)	cm / kg	0	0						

== Other pages ==
- (in Japanese) J. League official site
