= Daisuke Oku =

Japanese footballer (1976–2014)

Daisuke Oku 奥 大介
Personal information
- Full name: Daisuke Oku
- Date of birth: February 7, 1976
- Place of birth: Amagasaki, Hyogo, Japan
- Date of death: October 17, 2014 (aged 38)
- Place of death: Miyakojima, Okinawa, Japan
- Height: 1.73 m (5 ft 8 in)
- Position: Midfielder

Youth career
- 1991–1993: Kobe Koryo Gakuen High School

Senior career*
Years	Team	Apps	(Gls)
1994–2001	Júbilo Iwata	147	(36)
2002–2006	Yokohama F. Marinos	117	(25)
2007	Yokohama FC	16	(1)
Total		280	(62)

International career
1995	Japan U-20	4	(1)
1998–2004	Japan	26	(2)
Medal record
Júbilo Iwata
Winner	J1 League	1997
Winner	J1 League	1999
Runner-up	J1 League	1998
Runner-up	J1 League	2001
Winner	J.League Cup	1998
Runner-up	J.League Cup	1994
Runner-up	J.League Cup	1997
Runner-up	J.League Cup	2001
Yokohama F. Marinos
Winner	J1 League	2003
Winner	J1 League	2004
Runner-up	J1 League	2002
Representing Japan
AFC Asian Cup
Gold medal – first place	2000 Lebanon
- * Club domestic league appearances and goals

Daisuke Oku (奧 大介, Oku Daisuke; February 7, 1976 – October 17, 2014) was a Japanese football player. He played for Japan national team.

== Club career ==
Oku was born in Amagasaki on February 7, 1976. After graduating from high school, he joined Júbilo Iwata in 1994. He debuted in 1996. He became a regular player from 1997. The club won the champions at 1997, 1999 J1 League and 1998 J.League Cup. In Asia, the club won the champions 1998–99 Asian Club Championship and the 2nd place 1999–00 and 2000–01 Asian Club Championship. He moved to Yokohama F. Marinos in 2002. The club won the champions in 2003 and 2004 J1 League. He also played as captain and was selected Best Eleven in both seasons. He moved to Yokohama FC in 2007. He retired end of 2007 season.

== National team career ==
In April 1995, Oku was selected Japan U-20 national team for 1995 World Youth Championship. At this competition, he played all 4 matches and scored a goal against Brazil in Quarterfinals.

After 1998 World Cup, in October 1998, Oku was selected Japan national team by new manager Philippe Troussier. On October 28, he debuted for Japan against Egypt. He played at 1999 Copa América and 2000 Asian Cup. At 2000 Asian Cup, he played 4 matches and Japan won the champions. However he was not selected Japan for 2002 World Cup. In 2003, he was selected Japan for the first time in 2 years by manager Zico. He also played at 2003 Confederations Cup. He played 26 games and scored 2 goals for Japan until 2004.

== Personal life ==
Oku married actress Hinako Saeki in 2002. In 2013, Oku was arrested by Kanagawa Prefecture police after he threatened to kill Hinako on multiple occasions. Saeki eventually filed for divorce later that year. But prosecutors decided not to indict Oku.

== Death ==
On the morning of 17 October 2014, Oku was killed following a car accident on Miyako Island. He was driving on a prefectural road at about 4:25 a.m. when his car veered into the opposite lane and struck a telephone pole. According to police, he was transported to a hospital, where he was soon pronounced dead from a broken pelvis and other injuries. There were no other passengers in the car and following his death, police began investigating the cause of the accident.

== Club statistics ==
Club performance			League		Cup		League Cup		Continental		Total	
Season	Club	League	Apps	Goals	Apps	Goals	Apps	Goals	Apps	Goals	Apps	Goals
Japan			League		Emperor's Cup		J.League Cup		Asia		Total	
1994	Júbilo Iwata	J1 League	0	0	0	0	0	0	-		0	0
1995	Júbilo Iwata	J1 League	0	0	0	0	-		-		0	0
1996	Júbilo Iwata	J1 League	6	0	0	0	8	0	-		14	0
1997	Júbilo Iwata	J1 League	26	9	4	0	12	3	-		42	12
1998	Júbilo Iwata	J1 League	32	12	3	0	6	2	-		41	14
1999	Júbilo Iwata	J1 League	28	7	3	0	4	0	-		35	7
2000	Júbilo Iwata	J1 League	30	4	3	0	4	0	-		37	4
2001	Júbilo Iwata	J1 League	25	4	2	0	6	0	-		33	4
2002	Yokohama F. Marinos	J1 League	26	7	2	1	0	0	-		28	8
2003	Yokohama F. Marinos	J1 League	26	5	1	0	5	1	-		32	6
2004	Yokohama F. Marinos	J1 League	25	10	2	1	4	1	4	1	35	13
2005	Yokohama F. Marinos	J1 League	25	1	2	1	1	0	5	1	33	3
2006	Yokohama F. Marinos	J1 League	15	2	1	0	4	0	-		20	2
2007	Yokohama FC	J1 League	16	1	0	0	2	1	-		18	2
Total			280	62	23	3	56	8	9	1	350	72

== National team statistics ==
Japan national team
Year	Apps	Goals
1998	1	0
1999	5	1
2000	12	1
2001	4	0
2002	0	0
2003	3	0
2004	1	0
Total	26	2

== Honours ==
=== Club ===
Júbilo Iwata

- AFC Champions League: 1998–99; runner-up: 1999–2000, 2000–01
- Asian Super Cup: 1999
- J1 League: 1997, 1999
- J.League Cup: 1998; runner-up 2001
- Japanese Super Cup: 1998, 2000

Yokohama F. Marinos

- J1 League: 2003, 2004
- Japanese Super Cup: runner-up 2004, 2005

=== International ===
- AFC Asian Cup : 2000

=== Individual ===
- J1 League Best Eleven: 1998, 2003, 2004
