= Hiroshi Nanami =

Japanese football player and manager (born 1972)

Hiroshi Nanami 名波 浩
Personal information
- Date of birth: November 28, 1972 (age 53)
- Place of birth: Fujieda, Shizuoka, Japan
- Height: 1.77 m (5 ft 10 in)
- Position: Midfielder

Youth career
- 1988–1990: Shimizu Shogyo High School

College career
Years	Team	Apps	(Gls)
1991–1994	Juntendo University		

Senior career*
Years	Team	Apps	(Gls)
1995–2008	Júbilo Iwata	301	(32)
1999–2000	→ Venezia (loan)	24	(1)
2006	→ Cerezo Osaka (loan)	13	(2)
2007	→ Tokyo Verdy (loan)	17	(0)
Total		355	(35)

International career
1995–2001	Japan	67	(9)

Managerial career
- 2014–2019: Júbilo Iwata
- 2021–2022: Matsumoto Yamaga
Medal record
Men's football
Representing Japan
AFC Asian Cup
Gold medal – first place	2000 Lebanon
- * Club domestic league appearances and goals

Hiroshi Nanami (名波 浩, Nanami Hiroshi; born November 28, 1972) is a Japanese former professional footballer and an assistant coach of the Japan national team.

== Club career ==
Nanami was born in Fujieda on November 28, 1972. After graduating from Juntendo University, he joined Júbilo Iwata in 1995. From first season, he played as regular player and became a most central player in golden era in club history. The club won the champions 1997 J1 League and 1998 J.League Cup. He was also selected Best Eleven for three years in a row (1996-1998). In Asia, the club won 1998–99 Asian Club Championship.

In July 1999, Nanami moved to Serie A club Venezia on loan. However the club was relegated to Serie B in 2000. In September 2000, he returned to Júbilo Iwata. He hurts his knees in 2001 and he reduced opportunities to play in the match after that. The club won the champions at 2002 J1 League and 2003 Emperor's Cup. In 2006, his opportunity to play decreased and he moved to Cerezo Osaka in August 2006. In 2007, he moved to J2 League club Tokyo Verdy. In 2008, he returned to Júbilo Iwata and announced his retirement in November 2008 after being dogged by a knee injury.

== International career ==
Nanami was a key figure for the Japan national team throughout the late 1990s and during the early part of this century.

On August 6, 1995, Nanami debuted and scored a goal for Japan against Costa Rica. From 1996, he became a central player and wore the number 10 shirt. In 1996, he played all matches for Japan included 1996 Asian Cup. At 1998 World Cup qualification in 1997, Japan won the qualify for 1998 World Cup first time Japan's history. In 1998, he played all matches included World Cup. He also played at 1999 Copa América and 2000 Asian Cup. At 2000 Asian Cup, he played full time in all matches and scored 3 goals. Japan won the champions and he was selected MVP Awards. After he hurts his knees in 2001, he did not play for Japan. He played 67 games and scored 9 goals for Japan until 2001.

== Coaching career ==
In September 2014, Nanami became a manager for Júbilo Iwata as Péricles Chamusca successor. Júbilo played in J2 League in 2014 season and aimed to return to J1 League. However Júbilo finished at 4th place in 2014 and missed promotion to J1. In 2015, Júbilo won the 2nd place and promoted to J1 League. Although Júbilo finished 13th place in 2016, Júbilo gained Shunsuke Nakamura and rose at 6th place in 2017. However the club results were bad from 2018. Although Júbilo finished at 16th place of 18 clubs in 2018 and remained J1, he resigned in June 2019 when Júbilo was at the bottom place. On 21 June 2021, he appointed manager of J2 club, Matsumoto Yamaga. 5 months later, coach performance he was poor and his club got relegated to 2022 J3 League for first time in history. In 2022, he left the club after contract expired.

== Career statistics ==
=== Club ===
Appearances and goals by club, season and competition
Club	Season	League			National cup		League cup		Continental		Total	
Club	Season	Division	Apps	Goals	Apps	Goals	Apps	Goals	Apps	Goals	Apps	Goals
Júbilo Iwata	1995	J1 League	51	3	2	0	–		–		53	3
Júbilo Iwata	1996	J1 League	30	3	1	0	14	1	–		45	4
Júbilo Iwata	1997	J1 League	21	5	2	1	2	0	–		25	6
Júbilo Iwata	1998	J1 League	33	7	3	0	2	0	–		38	7
Júbilo Iwata	1999	J1 League	15	4	0	0	2	0	–		17	4
Júbilo Iwata	2000	J1 League	5	1	2	0	0	0	–		7	1
Júbilo Iwata	2001	J1 League	17	1	0	0	4	0	–		21	1
Júbilo Iwata	2002	J1 League	24	1	0	0	5	0	–		29	1
Júbilo Iwata	2003	J1 League	27	3	5	1	5	0	–		37	4
Júbilo Iwata	2004	J1 League	29	3	3	0	5	0	3	1	40	4
Júbilo Iwata	2005	J1 League	26	1	2	0	2	0	3	0	33	1
Júbilo Iwata	2006	J1 League	10	0	0	0	4	0	–		14	0
Júbilo Iwata	2008	J1 League	13	0	2	0	3	0	–		18	0
Júbilo Iwata	Total		301	32	22	2	48	1	6	1	376	36
Venezia (loan)	1999–2000	Serie A	24	1	7	1	–		–		31	2
Cerezo Osaka (loan)	2006	J1 League	13	2	0	0	0	0	–		13	2
Tokyo Verdy (loan)	2007	J2 League	17	0	1	0	–		–		18	0
Career total			355	35	29	3	48	1	6	1	438	40

=== International ===
Appearances and goals by national team and year
National team	Year	Apps	Goals
Japan	1995	2	2
Japan	1996	13	1
Japan	1997	21	3
Japan	1998	11	0
Japan	1999	6	0
Japan	2000	12	3
Japan	2001	2	0
Total		67	9

Scores and results list Japan's goal tally first, score column indicates score after each Nanami goal.

List of international goals scored by Hiroshi Nanami
No.	Date	Venue	Opponent	Score	Result	Competition
1	6 August 1995	Kyoto, Japan	Costa Rica	1–0	3–0	Friendly
2	24 October 1995	Tokyo, Japan	Saudi Arabia	1–0	2–1	Friendly
3	9 December 1996	Al Ain, United Arab Emirates	Uzbekistan	1–0	4–0	1996 AFC Asian Cup
4	25 March 1997	Muscat, Oman	Macau	5–0	10–0	1998 FIFA World Cup qualification
5	22 June 1997	Tokyo, Japan	Macau	5–0	10–0	1998 FIFA World Cup qualification
6	1 November 1997	Seoul, South Korea	South Korea	1–0	2–0	1998 FIFA World Cup qualification
7	14 October 2000	Sidon, Lebanon	Saudi Arabia	3–0	4–1	2000 AFC Asian Cup
8	24 October 2000	Beirut, Lebanon	Iraq	1–1	4–1	2000 AFC Asian Cup
9	24 October 2000	Beirut, Lebanon	Iraq	3–1	4–1	2000 AFC Asian Cup

== Managerial statistics ==
As of end 2022 season.

Team	From	To	Record				
Team	From	To	G	W	D	L	Win %
Júbilo Iwata	2014	2019	170	63	53	54	37.06
Matsumoto Yamaga	2021	2022	76	27	19	30	35.53
Total			246	90	72	84	36.59

== Honours ==
Júbilo Iwata

- Asian Club Championship: 1999
- J1 League: 1997, 1999, 2002
- Emperor's Cup: 2003
- J.League Cup: 1998
- Japanese Super Cup: 2003, 2004

Japan

- AFC Asian Cup: 2000

Individual

- AFC Asian Cup Most Valuable Player: 2000
- AFC Asian Cup Best Eleven: 1996, 2000
- J.League Best Eleven: 1996, 1997, 1998, 2002
- J.League 20th Anniversary Team
- J.League Cup New Hero Award: 1996
- Selected to AFC All Star Team: 1998, 2000
