= Akira Konno =

Japanese footballer

Akira Konno 今野 章
Personal information
- Full name: Akira Konno
- Date of birth: September 12, 1974 (age 52)
- Place of birth: Ofunato, Iwate, Japan
- Height: 1.65 m (5 ft 5 in)
- Position: Midfielder

Youth career
- 1990–1992: Ofunato High School
- 1993–1996: Kokushikan University

Senior career*
Years	Team	Apps	(Gls)
1997–1999	Júbilo Iwata	5	(0)
2000–2006	Kawasaki Frontale	158	(24)
Total		163	(24)
Medal record
Júbilo Iwata
Winner	J1 League	1997
Winner	J1 League	1999
Runner-up	J1 League	1998
Winner	J.League Cup	1998
Runner-up	J.League Cup	1997
Kawasaki Frontale
Runner-up	J1 League	2006
Runner-up	J.League Cup	2000
- * Club domestic league appearances and goals

Akira Konno (今野 章, Konno Akira; born September 12, 1974) is a former Japanese football player.

== Playing career ==
Konno was born in Ofunato on September 12, 1974. After graduating from Kokushikan University, he joined the J1 League club Júbilo Iwata in 1997. He played as right side back, as well as his original position, offensive midfielder, but he did not play often. In 2000, he moved to the newly promoted J1 League club, Kawasaki Frontale. He played many matches as offensive midfielder and the club won second place in the 2000 J.League Cup. However the club results were poor in league competition and it was relegated to the J2 League in 2001. He then played in many matches as a central player and the club won the championship in 2004 and was promoted to J1 in 2005. However he did not play as much after that and he retired at the end of the 2006 season.

== Career statistics ==
Appearances and goals by club, season and competition
Club	Season	League			Emperor's Cup		J.League Cup		Total	
Club	Season	Division	Apps	Goals	Apps	Goals	Apps	Goals	Apps	Goals
Júbilo Iwata	1997	J1 League	0	0	0	0	1	0	1	0
Júbilo Iwata	1998	J1 League	4	0	0	0	1	0	5	0
Júbilo Iwata	1999	J1 League	1	0	0	0	1	0	2	0
Kawasaki Frontale	2000	J1 League	20	3	1	0	4	0	25	3
Kawasaki Frontale	2001	J2 League	35	9	5	0	2	0	42	9
Kawasaki Frontale	2002	J2 League	21	2	5	1	—		26	3
Kawasaki Frontale	2003	J2 League	41	7	4	1	—		45	8
Kawasaki Frontale	2004	J2 League	24	2	1	0	—		25	2
Kawasaki Frontale	2005	J1 League	9	1	0	0	4	0	13	1
Kawasaki Frontale	2006	J1 League	8	0	1	0	3	1	12	1
Career total			163	24	17	2	16	1	196	27
