= Satoshi Okura =

Japanese footballer

Satoshi Okura 大倉 智
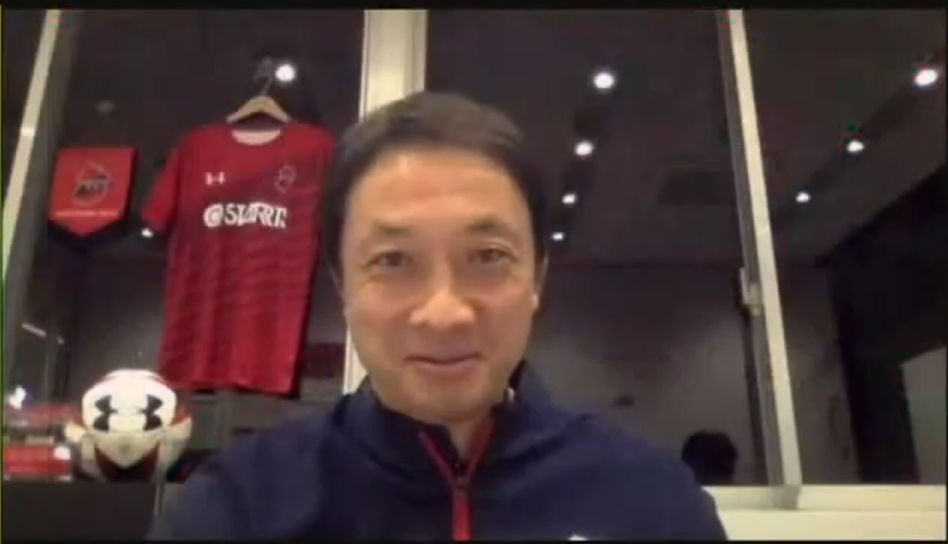

Personal information
- Full name: Satoshi Okura
- Date of birth: May 22, 1969 (age 57)
- Place of birth: Tokyo, Japan
- Height: 1.80 m (5 ft 11 in)
- Position: Forward

Youth career
- 1985–1987: Gyosei High School
- 1988–1991: Waseda University

Senior career*
Years	Team	Apps	(Gls)
1992–1995	Kashiwa Reysol	35	(6)
1996	Júbilo Iwata	4	(0)
1997	Brummell Sendai	26	(8)
1998	Jacksonville Cyclones		
Total		65	(14)
- * Club domestic league appearances and goals

Satoshi Okura (大倉 智, Okura Satoshi; born May 22, 1969) is a former Japanese football player. He is currently chairman of Iwaki FC.

== Playing career ==
Okura was born in Tokyo on May 22, 1969. After graduating from Waseda University, he joined Hitachi (later Kashiwa Reysol) in 1992. He played as a forward from his first season. In 1996, he moved to Júbilo Iwata. However he had hardly any playing time, with only nine appearances, four in regular league games, and five in the league cup. In 1997, he moved to Japan Football League club Brummell Sendai. He played as a regular player for one season. In 1998, he moved to the United States and joined the Jacksonville Cyclones. He retired as a player in September 1998.

== Club statistics ==
Club performance			League		Cup		League Cup		Total	
Season	Club	League	Apps	Goals	Apps	Goals	Apps	Goals	Apps	Goals
Japan			League		Emperor's Cup		J.League Cup		Total	
1992	Hitachi	Football League	6	0			-		6	0
1993	Kashiwa Reysol	Football League	12	5	1	0	6	4	19	9
1994	Kashiwa Reysol	Football League	0	0	0	0	0	0	0	0
1995	Kashiwa Reysol	J1 League	17	1	2	0	-		19	1
1996	Júbilo Iwata	J1 League	4	0	0	0	5	1	9	1
1997	Brummell Sendai	Football League	26	8	2	2	3	0	31	10
Total			65	14	5	2	14	5	84	21
