= Dmitri Radchenko =

Russian footballer (born 1970)

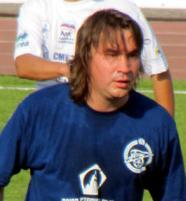

Personal information
- Full name: Dmitri Leonidovich Radchenko
- Date of birth: 2 December 1970 (age 55)
- Place of birth: Leningrad, Soviet Union
- Height: 1.84 m (6 ft 0 in)
- Position: Striker

Youth career
- Smena

Senior career*
Years	Team	Apps	(Gls)
1988	Dynamo Leningrad	20	(5)
1989–1990	Zenit Leningrad	61	(15)
1991–1993	Spartak Moscow	61	(27)
1993–1995	Racing Santander	72	(21)
1995–1999	Deportivo La Coruña	28	(5)
1996–1997	→ Rayo Vallecano	31	(1)
1997–1998	→ Mérida	10	(0)
1998–1999	→ Compostela	9	(0)
1999–2000	Júbilo Iwata	22	(4)
2001–2002	Hajduk Split	10	(4)
2002–2003	Bergantiños		
2004–2006	CD Baio		
2007–2008	Bergantiños B		

International career
1990	USSR	2	(0)
1992–1996	Russia	33	(9)

Managerial career
- 2004–2006: Deportivo La Coruña (youth)
- 2010–2013: Zenit Saint Petersburg (academy)
- 2013: Zenit Saint Petersburg (assistant)
- 2018: Akhmat Grozny (assistant)
- 2018–2019: Zenit-2 Saint Petersburg (assistant)
- * Club domestic league appearances and goals

Dmitri Leonidovich Radchenko (Дмитрий Леонидович Радченко; born 2 December 1970) is a Russian football coach and former player who played as a striker.

During his professional career he played in four countries, including in La Liga.

== Career ==
Born in Leningrad, Soviet Union, Radchenko started his professional career in his hometown, moving in 1991 to FC Spartak Moscow and helping the capital side to the first two editions of the Russian Premier League. In the 1990–91 edition of the European Cup he was essential in the quarter-final ousting of Real Madrid, notably scoring twice in the 3–1 away win.

For 1993–94, Radchenko signed with Racing Santander in Spain alongside teammate Dmitri Popov, and experienced arguably the best years in his career, notably scoring in a 5–0 home routing of FC Barcelona in his second season. A move to rising Deportivo de La Coruña followed, but he failed to establish in the starting XI, although heavily featured; the next three campaigns combined, he only netted once, with Rayo Vallecano, CP Mérida (both relegated from La Liga) and SD Compostela (Segunda División – where he shared teams again with Popov).

After relative success with Júbilo Iwata and HNK Hajduk Split, Radchenko finished his career in 2008 in the lower leagues of Spain (with some periods of inactivity in between). He played for Russia at the 1994 FIFA World Cup, where he scored a goal against Cameroon (6–1, with the remaining five courtesy of Oleg Salenko).

== Career statistics ==
=== Club ===
Appearances and goals by club, season and competition
Club	Season	League			National cup (Note: Includes Soviet Cup, Russian Cup, Copa del Rey, Emperor's Cup, Croatian Cup)		League cup (Note: Includes Federation Cup, Russian Premier League Cup, Copa de la Liga, J.League Cup)		Total	
Club	Season	Division	Apps	Goals	Apps	Goals	Apps	Goals	Apps	Goals
Dynamo Leningrad	1988	Second League	20	5					20	5
Zenit Leningrad	1989	Top League	26	4					26	4
Zenit Leningrad	1990	First League	35	11					35	11
Zenit Leningrad	Total		61	15					61	15
Spartak Moscow	1991	Top League	29	13					29	13
Spartak Moscow	1992	Top League	18	12					18	12
Spartak Moscow	1993	Top League	14	2					14	2
Spartak Moscow	Total		61	27					61	27
Racing de Santander	1993–94	La Liga	36	11					36	11
Racing de Santander	1994–95	La Liga	36	9					36	9
Racing de Santander	Total		72	20					72	20
Deportivo	1995–96	La Liga	28	5					28	5
Rayo Vallecano	1996–97	La Liga	31	1					31	1
Mérida	1997–98	La Liga	10	0					10	0
Compostela	1998–99	Segunda División	9	0					9	0
Júbilo Iwata	1999	J1 League	5	0	2	1	0	0	7	1
Júbilo Iwata	2000	J1 League	17	4	0	0	4	1	21	5
Júbilo Iwata	Total		22	4	2	1	4	1	28	6
Hajduk Split	2001–02	First Football League	10	4					10	4
Career total			324	82	2	1	4	1	330	83

=== International ===
Appearances and goals by national team and year
National team	Year	Apps	Goals
Soviet Union	1990	2	0
Total		2	0
Russia	1992	2	1
Russia	1993	5	1
Russia	1994	11	5
Russia	1995	8	2
Russia	1996	7	0
Total		33	9

Scores and results list Russia's goal tally first, score column indicates score after each Radchenko goal.

List of international goals scored by Dmitri Radchenko
No.	Date	Venue	Opponent	Score	Result	Competition
1	28 October 1992	Luzhniki, Moscow, Russia	Luxembourg	2–0	2–0	1994 FIFA World Cup qualification
2	29 January 1994	Kingdome, Seattle, United States	United States	1–0	1–1	Friendly
3	2 February 1994	Oakland–Alameda County Coliseum, Oakland, United States	Mexico	2–1	4–1	Friendly
4	20 April 1994	Bursa Atatürk, Bursa, Turkey	Turkey	1–0	1–0	Friendly
5	28 June 1994	Stanford Stadium, Stanford, United States	Cameroon	6–1	6–1	1994 FIFA World Cup
6	12 October 1994	Luzhniki, Moscow, Russia	San Marino	4–0	4–0	UEFA Euro 1996 qualifying
7	16 November 1994	Hampden Park, Glasgow, Scotland	Scotland	1–1	1–1	Euro 1996 qualifying
8	16 August 1995	Olympic Stadium, Helsinki, Finland	Finland	3–0	6–0	Euro 1996 qualifying
9	15 November 1995	Luzhniki, Moscow, Russia	Finland	1–0	3–1	Euro 1996 qualifying

== Honours ==
- Russian Premier League: 1992, 1993
- USSR/CIS Cup: 1992
- Russian Cup: 1994
- Supercopa de España: 1995
