= Valmir Louruz =

Brazilian footballer and manager

Personal information
- Date of birth: March 13, 1944
- Place of birth: Porto Alegre (RS - Brazil)
- Date of death: April 29, 2015 (aged 71)
- Position: Defender

Senior career*
Years	Team	Apps	(Gls)
1967–1968	Pelotas		
1968	Palmeiras		
1969–1971	Internacional		
1971	CSA		

Managerial career
- 1981: Juventude
- 1981–1983: Pelotas
- 1984: CSA
- 1984: Juventude
- 1985–1986: Brasil de Pelotas
- 1986: CSA
- 1987: Londrina
- 1987: Vitória
- 1988: Náutico
- 1988–1989: Vitória
- 1990–1993: Kuwait Olympic
- 1994: Santa Cruz
- 1995: Londrina
- 1996: Tuna Luso
- 1997: Paysandu
- 1997: Pelotas
- 1998: Júbilo Iwata
- 1999: Juventude
- 1999: Internacional
- 2000: Juventude
- 2000–2001: Figueirense
- 2001–2002: Vila Nova
- 2003: São José
- 2003: Pelotas
- 2003–2005: Al-Ahli (Jeddah)
- 2005–2006: CSA
- 2006–2007: Pelotas
- 2007–2008: Duque de Caxias
- 2009: CRB
- * Club domestic league appearances and goals

Valmir Louruz (Porto Alegre, March 13, 1944 – April 29, 2015) was a Brazilian football manager.

== Managerial statistics ==
Team	From	To	Record				
Team	From	To	G	W	D	L	Win %
Júbilo Iwata	1998	1998	34	26	0	8	76.47
Total			34	26	0	8	76.47

== Honors ==
=== Player ===
Internacional

- Campeonato Gaúcho: 1969, 1970, 1971

=== Manager ===
CSA

- Campeonato Alagoano: 1981

Vitória

- Campeonato Baiano: 1989

Júbilo Iwata

- J. League Cup: 1998

Juventude

- Copa do Brasil: 1999
