= 1996 Júbilo Iwata season =

Júbilo Iwata
1996 season
- Manager: Hans Ooft
- Stadium: Júbilo Iwata Stadium
- J.League: 4th
- Emperor's Cup: 3rd Round
- J.League Cup: GL-A 5th
- Top goalscorer: League: Salvatore Schillaci (15); All: Salvatore Schillaci (18)
- Highest home attendance: 17,543 (vs Shimizu S-Pulse, 9 November 1996)
- Lowest home attendance: 11,924 (vs Bellmare Hiratsuka, 15 May 1996)
- Average home league attendance: 13,792
Home colours	Away colours

1996 Júbilo Iwata season

== Review and events ==
=== League results summary ===
Overall								Home						Away					
Pld	W	D	L	GF	GA	GD	Pts	W	D	L	GF	GA	GD	W	D	L	GF	GA	GD
30	20	0	10	53	38	+15	62	9	0	6	27	20	+7	11	0	4	26	18	+8

Source: J.LEAGUE OFFICIAL GUIDE 1997. ISBN 4-09-102329-0.

=== League results by round ===
Round	1	2	3	4	5	6	7	8	9	10	11	12	13	14	15	16	17	18	19	20	21	22	23	24	25	26	27	28	29	30
Ground	H	A	H	H	A	H	A	H	A	A	H	H	A	H	A	A	H	A	H	A	H	A	A	H	A	H	A	H	A	H
Result	W	W	W	L	W	W	W	W	L	W	L	W	W	L	L	W	W	L	L	W	W	W	W	L	W	W	L	W	W	L
Position	3	4	3	4	3	2	2	2	3	2	3	2	2	3	4	3	3	6	6	6	6	4	4	6	5	5	4	4	3	4

Source: J.LEAGUE OFFICIAL GUIDE 1997. ISBN 4-09-102329-0.
A = Away; H = Home; W = Win; D = Draw; L = Loss

== Competitions ==
Competitions	Position
J.League	4th / 16 clubs
Emperor's Cup	3rd round
J.League Cup	GL-A 5th / 8 clubs

== Domestic results ==
=== J.League ===
16 March 1996 1	Júbilo Iwata	3–0	Avispa Fukuoka	Júbilo Iwata Stadium
16:04 JST (UTC+09)	Nakayama 48', 89'; Fujita 89'	J. League		Attendance: 13,439; Referee: Hiroyuki Umemoto; Assistant referees: Hiroshi Fukuda, Yasushi Tsuchimoto; Fourth official: Toshiaki Futamata

20 March 1996 2	Yokohama Marinos	0–1 (V-goal) (a.e.t.)	Júbilo Iwata	Yokohama Mitsuzawa Football Stadium
15:03 JST (UTC+09)		J. League	Nanami 95'	Attendance: 12,840; Referee: Kazuo Kakihana; Assistant referees: Masahiro Katagiri, Susumu Takeda; Fourth official: Hiroshi Yamaguchi

23 March 1996 3	Júbilo Iwata	2–0	Gamba Osaka	Júbilo Iwata Stadium
14:04 JST (UTC+09)	Nakayama 72'; Schillaci 77'	J. League		Attendance: 11,927; Referee: Tatsumi Ōno; Assistant referees: Kimio Izaki, Kō Ōishi; Fourth official: Tōru Nagata

30 March 1996 4	Júbilo Iwata	1–1 (V-goal) (a.e.t.) (3–4 p)	Urawa Red Diamonds	Júbilo Iwata Stadium
14:02 JST (UTC+09)	Dunga 11'	J. League	Bein 27'	Attendance: 12,730; Referee: Yasuhiro Matsuzaki; Assistant referees: Naoyuki Mori, Masatoshi Shibata; Fourth official: Takuya Okada
	Penalties
	(penalty scored) Vanenburg; (penalty missed) Dunga; (penalty scored) Fujita; (penalty missed) Kudō; (penalty scored) Schillaci		(penalty scored) Hirose; (penalty scored) Taguchi; (penalty scored) Hori; (penalty missed) Yamada; (penalty scored) N. Ikeda

3 April 1996 5	Nagoya Grampus Eight	1–2	Júbilo Iwata	Nagoya Mizuho Athletics Stadium
19:01 JST (UTC+09)	Mochizuki 72'	J. League	Takeda 76'; Fujita 78'	Attendance: 21,576; Referee: Hiroyuki Umemoto; Assistant referees: Sōichirō Kaneko, Kazuhiko Matsumura; Fourth official: Yūji Kōda

6 April 1996 6	Júbilo Iwata	2–1	Verdy Kawasaki	Júbilo Iwata Stadium
15:02 JST (UTC+09)	37' (o.g.); Schillaci 68'	J. League	K. Miura 35'	Attendance: 16,381; Referee: Kiyoshi Ōta; Assistant referees: Kimio Izaki, Takao Onshi; Fourth official: Toshiaki Futamata

13 April 1996 7	JEF United Ichihara	2–4	Júbilo Iwata	Ichihara Stadium
19:04 JST (UTC+09)	Nakanishi 62'; Hašek 86'	J. League	Nakayama 45'; Fukunishi 55'; Nanami 67'; Takeda 81'	Attendance: 13,652; Referee: Piotr Werner; Assistant referees: Masahiro Katagiri, Akihisa Makino; Fourth official: Kazuya Isokawa

17 April 1996 8	Júbilo Iwata	2–2 (V-goal) (a.e.t.) (4–3 p)	Kashima Antlers	Júbilo Iwata Stadium
19:00 JST (UTC+09)	Nakayama 2'; Takeda 60'	J. League	Jorginho 0'; Leonardo 81'	Attendance: 14,165; Referee: Yoshimi Ogawa; Assistant referees: Naoyuki Mori, Kōji Taniuchi; Fourth official: Tōru Nagata
	Penalties
	(penalty scored) Fujita; (penalty scored) Vanenburg; (penalty scored) Nanami; (penalty missed) Endō; (penalty scored) Nakayama		(penalty missed) Jorginho; (penalty scored) Honda; (penalty scored) Hasegawa; (penalty missed) Manaka; (penalty scored) Leonardo

20 April 1996 9	Cerezo Osaka	2–1	Júbilo Iwata	Ehime Matsuyama Athletic Stadium
16:02 JST (UTC+09)	Narcizio 32', 37'	J. League	Takeda 23'	Attendance: 6,323; Referee: Masayoshi Okada; Assistant referees: Satoru Kawano, Kazuhiko Matsumura; Fourth official: Hiroshi Yoshinouchi

27 April 1996 10	Shimizu S-Pulse	1–2 (V-goal) (a.e.t.)	Júbilo Iwata	Nihondaira Sports Stadium
15:05 JST (UTC+09)	55' (o.g.)	J. League	H. Suzuki 74'; Fujita 91'	Attendance: 21,931; Referee: Yasuhiro Hemmi; Assistant referees: Yasushi Tsuchimoto, Naoyuki Mori; Fourth official: Toshiyuki Asanuma

1 May 1996 11	Júbilo Iwata	2–3	Yokohama Flügels	Júbilo Iwata Stadium
19:00 JST (UTC+09)	Schillaci 14'; Vanenburg 32'	J. League	Satsukawa 29'; Hattori 66'; Maezono 75'	Attendance: 14,231; Referee: Fumikazu Shioyazono; Assistant referees: Kazuhisa Osada, Hitoshi Nakagomi; Fourth official: Toshiaki Futamata

4 May 1996 12	Júbilo Iwata	1–0	Sanfrecce Hiroshima	Júbilo Iwata Stadium
14:00 JST (UTC+09)	Vanenburg 24'	J. League		Attendance: 16,639; Referee: Masayoshi Okada; Assistant referees: Takashi Kunori, Satoru Kawano; Fourth official: Tōru Nagata

11 May 1996 13	Kyoto Purple Sanga	1–2 (V-goal) (a.e.t.)	Júbilo Iwata	Kyoto Nishikyogoku Stadium
16:04 JST (UTC+09)	Alexandre 51'	J. League	Vanenburg 69'; Schillaci 90'	Attendance: 16,980; Referee: Tatsumi Ōno; Assistant referees: Sōichirō Kaneko, Takashi Aoki; Fourth official: Yoshihisa Takahashi

15 May 1996 14	Júbilo Iwata	3–4	Bellmare Hiratsuka	Júbilo Iwata Stadium
19:00 JST (UTC+09)	Schillaci 57', 83', 89'	J. League	Simão 3'; Betinho 49', 55', 81'	Attendance: 11,924; Referee: Hiroshi Tanabe; Assistant referees: Morihisa Yamaguchi, Yasushi Tsuchimoto; Fourth official: Takuya Okada

18 May 1996 15	Kashiwa Reysol	4–0	Júbilo Iwata	Hitachi Kashiwa Soccer Stadium
15:03 JST (UTC+09)	Edílson 27', 35', 58'; Watanabe 44'	J. League		Attendance: 13,462; Referee: Hideo Kikuchi; Assistant referees: Kenichi Koshiyama, Kō Ōishi; Fourth official: Terunobu Kakinuma

28 August 1996 16	Sanfrecce Hiroshima	0–3	Júbilo Iwata	Hiroshima Big Arch
19:00 JST (UTC+09)		J. League	Dunga 0', 61'; Nakayama 41'	Attendance: 6,585; Referee: Bemard Saules; Assistant referees: Morihisa Yamaguchi, Hiroyuki Ōnishi; Fourth official: Hideki Tanigawa

31 August 1996 17	Júbilo Iwata	2–1	Kyoto Purple Sanga	Júbilo Iwata Stadium
19:00 JST (UTC+09)	Nakayama 15'; Hattori 80'	J. League	Matsuhashi 18'	Attendance: 12,358; Referee: Zoran Petrović; Assistant referees: Hisaharu Kitamura, Tetsu Karakida; Fourth official: Toshiaki Futamata

7 September 1996 18	Bellmare Hiratsuka	3–0	Júbilo Iwata	Hiratsuka Stadium
19:04 JST (UTC+09)	Seki 49', 70'; Almir 82'	J. League		Attendance: 8,015; Referee: Naotsugu Fuse; Assistant referees: Satoru Ishizawa, Keiji Kamiara; Fourth official: Jōji Kashihara

14 September 1996 19	Júbilo Iwata	2–3 (V-goal) (a.e.t.)	Kashiwa Reysol	Júbilo Iwata Stadium
19:00 JST (UTC+09)	Schillaci 35'; Hattori 72'	J. League	Sakai 26'; Edílson 85' 108'	Attendance: 13,163; Referee: Fumikazu Shioyazono; Assistant referees: Kazuaki Hamaguchi, Naoyuki Mori; Fourth official: Tōru Nagata

21 September 1996 20	Avispa Fukuoka	1–3	Júbilo Iwata	Hakatanomori Football Stadium
15:00 JST (UTC+09)	Báez 44'	J. League	34' (o.g.); Vanenburg 59', 70'	Attendance: 8,287; Referee: Kazuo Kakihana; Assistant referees: Masatoshi Shibata, Kazuhiko Matsumura; Fourth official: Ryōichi Imamura

28 September 1996 21	Júbilo Iwata	1–0	Yokohama Marinos	Júbilo Iwata Stadium
14:00 JST (UTC+09)	Schillaci 89'	J. League		Attendance: 14,688; Referee: Lim Kee Chong; Assistant referees: Kōji Taniuchi, Ichirō Inukai; Fourth official: Takuya Okada

2 October 1996 22	Gamba Osaka	0–1	Júbilo Iwata	Expo '70 Commemorative Stadium
19:00 JST (UTC+09)		J. League	Schillaci 15'	Attendance: 5,025; Referee: Zoran Petrović; Assistant referees: Akio Okutani, Hiroyuki Izumi; Fourth official: Tamotsu Ōnishi

5 October 1996 23	Urawa Red Diamonds	0–2	Júbilo Iwata	Urawa Komaba Stadium
15:03 JST (UTC+09)		J. League	Nakayama 22'; Nanami 82'	Attendance: 20,044; Referee: Leslie Mottram; Assistant referees: Kazuaki Hamaguchi, Hisaharu Kitamura; Fourth official: Toshimitsu Yasumoto

16 October 1996 24	Júbilo Iwata	0–2	Nagoya Grampus Eight	Júbilo Iwata Stadium
19:00 JST (UTC+09)		J. League	Mochizuki 75'; Durix 85'	Attendance: 13,512; Referee: Kenji Tanaka; Assistant referees: Kazuya Yanagisawa, Toshimitsu Yoshida; Fourth official: Takuya Okada

19 October 1996 25	Verdy Kawasaki	0–1	Júbilo Iwata	Toyama Stadium
15:03 JST (UTC+09)		J. League	Schillaci 6'	Attendance: 10,250; Referee: Bemard Saules; Assistant referees: Takashi Kunori, Kōji Taniuchi; Fourth official: Atsushi Tanaka

26 October 1996 26	Júbilo Iwata	2–1	JEF United Ichihara	Júbilo Iwata Stadium
14:01 JST (UTC+09)	Schillaci 16'; Nakayama 77'	J. League	Hašek 29'	Attendance: 12,164; Referee: Hiroyuki Umemoto; Assistant referees: Sōichirō Kaneko, Kazuhisa Osada; Fourth official: Takuya Okada

30 October 1996 27	Kashima Antlers	2–2 (V-goal) (a.e.t.) (4–3 p)	Júbilo Iwata	Kashima Soccer Stadium
19:02 JST (UTC+09)	Mazinho 40', 76'	J. League	Schillaci 1'; Fukunishi 55'	Attendance: 15,823; Referee: Zoran Petrović; Assistant referees: Kimio Izaki, Takuji Fukazawa; Fourth official: Masao Komada
	Penalties
	(penalty scored) Mazinho; (penalty scored) Honda; (penalty scored) Hasegawa; (penalty scored) Akita		(penalty scored) Hattori; (penalty scored) Nanami; (penalty missed) Nakayama; (penalty scored) Kudō; (penalty missed) Koga

2 November 1996 28	Júbilo Iwata	3–0	Cerezo Osaka	Júbilo Iwata Stadium
14:00 JST (UTC+09)	44' (o.g.); Schillaci 65'; Fujita 75'	J. League		Attendance: 12,019; Referee: Tōru Kamikawa; Assistant referees: Mitsuru Satō, Hitoshi Nakagomi; Fourth official: Tōru Nagata

6 November 1996 29	Yokohama Flügels	1–2	Júbilo Iwata	Yokohama Mitsuzawa Football Stadium
19:04 JST (UTC+09)	Maezono 47'	J. League	Dunga 63'; Hattori 89'	Attendance: 14,070; Referee: Zoran Petrović; Assistant referees: Noboru Ishiyama, Toshimitsu Yoshida; Fourth official: Tadashi Fujiwara

9 November 1996 30	Júbilo Iwata	1–2	Shimizu S-Pulse	Júbilo Iwata Stadium
14:33 JST (UTC+09)	Schillaci 64'	J. League	T. Itō 36', 89'	Attendance: 17,543; Referee: Yoshimi Ogawa; Assistant referees: Morihisa Yamaguchi, Naoki Esumi; Fourth official: Takuya Okada

=== Emperor's Cup ===
1st Round	bye

2nd Round	bye

17 November 1996 3rd Round	Júbilo Iwata	1–2	Fukushima FC	Júbilo Iwata Stadium
13:00 JST (UTC+09)	Fukunishi 81'		川口 裕之 54'; 65' (o.g.)	Attendance: 6,233

=== J.League Cup ===
1 June 1996 GL-A-1-1	Sanfrecce Hiroshima	1–0	Júbilo Iwata	Hiroshima Big Arch
17:31 JST (UTC+09)	Huistra 57'	J. League		Attendance: 11,468; Referee: Yasuhiro Hemmi; Assistant referees: Naoki Esumi, Masatoshi Shibata; Fourth official: Keiichi Nadamoto

5 June 1996 GL-A-1-2	Júbilo Iwata	1–0 (1–1 agg.)	Sanfrecce Hiroshima	Júbilo Iwata Stadium
19:02 JST (UTC+09)	Nakayama 41'	J. League		Attendance: 8,354; Referee: Piotr Werner; Assistant referees: Yasushi Tsuchimoto, Tetsu Karakida; Fourth official: Takuya Okada

8 June 1996 GL-A-2-1	Júbilo Iwata	3–1	Gamba Osaka	Júbilo Iwata Stadium
19:02 JST (UTC+09)	Nanami 23'; Fujita 30'; Schillaci 89'	J. League	Gillhaus 12'	Attendance: 13,150; Referee: Yoshimi Ogawa; Assistant referees: Naoyuki Mori, Kōji Minami; Fourth official: Toshiaki Futamata

12 June 1996 GL-A-2-2	Gamba Osaka	0–5 (1–8 agg.)	Júbilo Iwata	Expo '70 Commemorative Stadium
19:00 JST (UTC+09)	Vanenburg 30'; Nakayama 34', 89'; Takeda 35'; Ōkura 71'	J. League		Attendance: 5,421; Referee: Archundia; Assistant referees: Yoshikazu Hiroshima, Kazuhiko Matsumura; Fourth official: Tamotsu Ōnishi

15 June 1996 GL-A-3-1	Kashiwa Reysol	2–1	Júbilo Iwata	Hitachi Kashiwa Soccer Stadium
18:30 JST (UTC+09)	Wagner 24'; Sakai 87'	J. League	Schillaci 65'	Attendance: 11,276; Referee: Kiyoshi Ōta; Assistant referees: Kōji Taniuchi, Masahiro Katagiri; Fourth official: Morio Fujita

19 June 1996 GL-A-3-2	Júbilo Iwata	1–1 (2–3 agg.)	Kashiwa Reysol	Júbilo Iwata Stadium
19:02 JST (UTC+09)	Katsuya 64'	J. League	Careca 36'	Attendance: 9,160; Referee: Yasuhiro Hemmi; Assistant referees: Toshimitsu Yoshida, Takuji Fukazawa; Fourth official: Tōru Nagata

22 June 1996 GL-A-4-1	Bellmare Hiratsuka	1–3	Júbilo Iwata	Hiratsuka Stadium
18:30 JST (UTC+09)	Natsuka 89'	J. League	Vanenburg 50'; Takeda 76'; Nakayama 82'	Attendance: 10,069; Referee: Kazuo Kakihana; Assistant referees: Mitsuru Satō, Kazuhiko Matsumura; Fourth official: Kazuhiko Uchida

26 June 1996 GL-A-4-2	Júbilo Iwata	2–1 (5–2 agg.)	Bellmare Hiratsuka	Júbilo Iwata Stadium
19:02 JST (UTC+09)	9' (o.g.); Hattori 89'	J. League	Paulinho 66'	Attendance: 8,696; Referee: Yasuhiro Matsuzaki; Assistant referees: Kazuaki Hamaguchi, Tetsu Karakida; Fourth official: Takuya Okada

29 June 1996 GL-A-5-1	Urawa Red Diamonds	1–2	Júbilo Iwata	Urawa Komaba Stadium
18:33 JST (UTC+09)	Fukuda 3' (pen.)	J. League	Nakayama 62'; Schillaci 89'	Attendance: 20,324; Referee: Tetsuya Hamana; Assistant referees: Akihisa Makino, Susumu Takeda; Fourth official: Shigeru Kimura

3 July 1996 GL-A-5-2	Júbilo Iwata	2–2 (4–3 agg.)	Urawa Red Diamonds	Júbilo Iwata Stadium
19:01 JST (UTC+09)	Nakayama 66'; Vanenburg 73' (pen.)	J. League	Fukuda 53'; Boli 86'	Attendance: 11,832; Referee: Kazuo Kakihana; Assistant referees: Kimio Izaki, Takuji Fukazawa; Fourth official: Tōru Nagata

10 August 1996 GL-A-6-1	Júbilo Iwata	0–2	Yokohama Marinos	Júbilo Iwata Stadium
19:00 JST (UTC+09)		J. League	Omura 24', 39'	Attendance: 17,139; Referee: Masayoshi Okada; Assistant referees: Sōichirō Kaneko, Takao Onshi; Fourth official: Toshiaki Futamata

14 August 1996 GL-A-6-2	Yokohama Marinos	2–0 (4–0 agg.)	Júbilo Iwata	Yokohama Mitsuzawa Football Stadium
19:03 JST (UTC+09)	T. Suzuki 31'; Bisconti 89'	J. League		Attendance: 13,125; Referee: Leslie Mottram; Assistant referees: Takashi Kunori, Takuji Fukazawa; Fourth official: Hiroshi Yamaguchi

17 August 1996 GL-A-7-1	Júbilo Iwata	0–0	Kyoto Purple Sanga	Tosu Stadium
19:04 JST (UTC+09)		J. League		Attendance: 12,658; Referee: Yasuhiro Hemmi; Assistant referees: Hideaki Harada, Kazuhiko Matsumura; Fourth official: Masao Motomura

21 August 1996 GL-A-7-2	Kyoto Purple Sanga	3–1 (3–1 agg.)	Júbilo Iwata	Kyoto Nishikyogoku Stadium
19:04 JST (UTC+09)	Carlos 43'; Ta. Yamaguchi 55'; Alexandre 64'	J. League	Nakayama 22'	Attendance: 10,320; Referee: Masayoshi Okada; Assistant referees: Toshiyuki Mayuzumi, Akihisa Makino; Fourth official: Morihisa Yamaguchi

== Player statistics ==
No.	Pos	Nat	Player	Total		J.League		Emperor's Cup		J.League Cup	
No.	Pos	Nat	Player	Apps	Goals	Apps	Goals	Apps	Goals	Apps	Goals
	GK	(Japan) JPN	Dido Havenaar	31	0	16	0	1	0	14	0
	GK	(Japan) JPN	Yūshi Ozaki	0	0	0	0	0	0	0	0
	GK	(Japan) JPN	Tomoaki Ōgami	15	0	15	0	0	0	0	0
	GK	(Japan) JPN	Yukiya Hamano	0	0	0	0	0	0	0	0
	GK	(Japan) JPN	Hiroki Kobayashi	0	0	0	0	0	0	0	0
	DF	(Japan) JPN	Toshinobu Katsuya	41	0	27	0	1	0	13	0
	DF	(Netherlands) NED	Vanenburg	34	8	22	5	0	0	12	3
	DF	(Japan) JPN	Ippei Watanabe	0	0	0	0	0	0	0	0
	DF	(Japan) JPN	Masahiro Endō	12	0	12	0	0	0	0	0
	DF	(Japan) JPN	Hideto Suzuki	32	1	21	1	1	0	10	0
	DF	(Japan) JPN	Makoto Tanaka	26	0	18	0	1	0	7	0
	DF	(Japan) JPN	Takahiro Yamanishi	0	0	0	0	0	0	0	0
	DF	(Japan) JPN	Kensuke Tsukuda	0	0	0	0	0	0	0	0
	DF	(Japan) JPN	Akira Matsumori	0	0	0	0	0	0	0	0
	MF	(Brazil) BRA	Dunga	34	4	20	4	1	0	13	0
	MF	(Japan) JPN	Masanori Suzuki	0	0	0	0	0	0	0	0
	MF	(Japan) JPN	Takuma Koga	34	0	24	0	0	0	10	0
	MF	(Japan) JPN	Toshiya Fujita	40	5	25	4	1	0	14	1
	MF	(Japan) JPN	Hiroshi Nanami	45	4	30	3	1	0	14	1
	MF	(Japan) JPN	Toshihiro Hattori	27	4	15	3	1	0	11	1
	MF	(Japan) JPN	Kiyokazu Kudō	22	0	20	0	1	0	1	0
	MF	(Japan) JPN	Daisuke Oku	14	0	6	0	0	0	8	0
	MF	(Japan) JPN	Takashi Fukunishi	38	3	27	2	1	1	10	0
	MF	(Japan) JPN	Masao Yamamoto	0	0	0	0	0	0	0	0
	FW	(Italy) ITA	Schillaci	31	18	23	15	0	0	8	3
	FW	(Japan) JPN	Nobuhiro Takeda	39	6	24	4	1	0	14	2
	FW	(Japan) JPN	Masashi Nakayama	40	16	27	9	0	0	13	7
	FW	(Japan) JPN	Satoshi Ōkura	9	1	4	0	0	0	5	1
	FW	(Japan) JPN	Naohiro Ōyama	0	0	0	0	0	0	0	0
	FW	(Japan) JPN	Norihisa Shimizu	2	0	0	0	1	0	1	0
	FW	(Japan) JPN	Takayuki Iwakura	0	0	0	0	0	0	0	0

- † player(s) joined the team after the opening of this season.

== Transfers ==
In:

No.	Pos.	Nation	Player
—	GK	JPN	Hiroki Kobayashi (from Shimizu Commercial High School)
—	DF	JPN	Ippei Watanabe (from Yokohama Flügels)
—	DF	JPN	Kensuke Tsukuda (from Júbilo Iwata youth)
—	DF	JPN	Akira Matsumori (from Funabashi municipal High School)
—	MF	JPN	Masao Yamamoto (from Shutoku Senior High School)
—	FW	JPN	Nobuhiro Takeda (from Verdy Kawasaki)
—	FW	JPN	Satoshi Ōkura (from Kashiwa Reysol)
—	FW	JPN	Takayuki Iwakura (from Yoshida High School)

Out:

No.	Pos.	Nation	Player
—	DF	NED	André Paus (to Fujitsu)
—	DF	JPN	Takeshi Yonezawa (to Gamba Osaka)
—	DF	JPN	Yasuyuki Iwasaki (to Honda Motor)
—	DF	JPN	Ryōsuke Kawaguchi (to Fujitsu)
—	MF	JPN	Mitsunori Yoshida (retired)
—	MF	JPN	Kenji Komata (to Albireo Niigata)
—	MF	JPN	Yasuyoshi Hanba (retired)
—	MF	JPN	Kōji Kawada (to Fukushima FC)
—	FW	PRK	Kim Jong-Song (to Zainichi Chosen Football Club)
—	FW	JPN	Takao Ōishi (retired)
—	FW	JPN	Yoshika Matsubara (to Shimizu S-Pulse)

== Awards ==
- J.League Best XI: (Japan) Hiroshi Nanami

== Other pages ==
- (in Japanese) J. League official site
- (in Japanese) Júbilo Iwata official site
