= 1999 Júbilo Iwata season =

Júbilo Iwata
1999 season
- Manager: Takashi Kuwahara
- Stadium: Júbilo Iwata Stadium
- J.League 1: Champions
- Emperor's Cup: Quarterfinals
- J.League Cup: Quarterfinals
- Top goalscorer: Takashi Fukunishi (10)
Home colours	Away colours

1999 Júbilo Iwata season

== Competitions ==
Competitions	Position
J.League 1	Champions / 16 clubs
Emperor's Cup	Quarterfinals
J.League Cup	Quarterfinals

== Domestic results ==
=== J.League 1 ===
6 March 1999 1-1	Júbilo Iwata	3-1	Vissel Kobe	Júbilo Iwata Stadium
JST (UTC+09)

13 March 1999 1-2	Sanfrecce Hiroshima	0-1	Júbilo Iwata	Hiroshima Big Arch
JST (UTC+09)

20 March 1999 1-3	Júbilo Iwata	3-0	Verdy Kawasaki	Júbilo Iwata Stadium
JST (UTC+09)

27 March 1999 1-4	Bellmare Hiratsuka	2-1	Júbilo Iwata	Hiratsuka Athletics Stadium
JST (UTC+09)

3 April 1999 1-5	Júbilo Iwata	2-1	Kyoto Purple Sanga	Júbilo Iwata Stadium
JST (UTC+09)

10 April 1999 1-6	Kashiwa Reysol	0-1	Júbilo Iwata	Hitachi Kashiwa Soccer Stadium
JST (UTC+09)

17 April 1999 1-7	Júbilo Iwata	1-0	Yokohama F. Marinos	Júbilo Iwata Stadium
JST (UTC+09)

24 April 1999 1-8	Shimizu S-Pulse	2-5	Júbilo Iwata	Nihondaira Sports Stadium
JST (UTC+09)

19 May 1999 1-9	Júbilo Iwata	1-2 (GG) (a.e.t.)	Cerezo Osaka	Júbilo Iwata Stadium
JST (UTC+09)

26 May 1999 1-10	Júbilo Iwata	1-0 (GG) (a.e.t.)	Avispa Fukuoka	Júbilo Iwata Stadium
JST (UTC+09)

5 May 1999 1-11	Kashima Antlers	1-2 (GG) (a.e.t.)	Júbilo Iwata	Tokyo National Stadium
JST (UTC+09)

8 May 1999 1-12	Júbilo Iwata	4-3	Urawa Red Diamonds	Júbilo Iwata Stadium
JST (UTC+09)

15 May 1999 1-13	Nagoya Grampus Eight	1-2	Júbilo Iwata	Mizuho Athletic Stadium
JST (UTC+09)

22 May 1999 1-14	Júbilo Iwata	1-0	Gamba Osaka	Júbilo Iwata Stadium
JST (UTC+09)

29 May 1999 1-15	JEF United Ichihara	2-1	Júbilo Iwata	Ichihara Seaside Stadium
JST (UTC+09)

6 August 1999 2-1	Yokohama F. Marinos	3-0	Júbilo Iwata	International Stadium Yokohama
JST (UTC+09)

14 August 1999 2-2	Júbilo Iwata	0-1	Shimizu S-Pulse	Júbilo Iwata Stadium
JST (UTC+09)

18 August 1999 2-3	Cerezo Osaka	3-2 (GG) (a.e.t.)	Júbilo Iwata	Osaka Nagai Stadium
JST (UTC+09)

21 August 1999 2-4	Hakatanomori Football Stadium	0-2	Júbilo Iwata	Hakatanomori Football Stadium
JST (UTC+09)

28 August 1999 2-5	Júbilo Iwata	0-4	Kashima Antlers	Júbilo Iwata Stadium
JST (UTC+09)

4 September 1999 2-6	Urawa Red Diamonds	1-2 (GG) (a.e.t.)	Júbilo Iwata	Tokyo National Stadium
JST (UTC+09)

11 September 1999 2-7	Júbilo Iwata	1-2	Nagoya Grampus Eight	Júbilo Iwata Stadium
JST (UTC+09)

15 September 1999 2-8	Gamba Osaka	3-1	Júbilo Iwata	Osaka Expo '70 Stadium
JST (UTC+09)

18 September 1999 2-9	Júbilo Iwata	1-2 (GG) (a.e.t.)	JEF United Ichihara	Júbilo Iwata Stadium
JST (UTC+09)

23 September 1999 2-10	Vissel Kobe	0-0 (GG) (a.e.t.)	Júbilo Iwata	Kobe Universiade Memorial Stadium
JST (UTC+09)

30 October 1999 2-11	Verdy Kawasaki	1-0	Júbilo Iwata	Tokyo National Stadium
JST (UTC+09)

7 November 1999 2-12	Júbilo Iwata	5-2	Sanfrecce Hiroshima	Júbilo Iwata Stadium
JST (UTC+09)

27 October 1999 2-13	Júbilo Iwata	0-1	Kashiwa Reysol	Júbilo Iwata Stadium
JST (UTC+09)

23 November 1999 2-14	Kyoto Purple Sanga	2-6	Júbilo Iwata	Nishikyogoku Athletic Stadium
JST (UTC+09)

27 November 1999 2-15	Júbilo Iwata	3-2	Bellmare Hiratsuka	Júbilo Iwata Stadium
JST (UTC+09)

=== Emperor's Cup ===
1st Round	bye

2nd Round	bye

15 December 1999 3rd Round	Júbilo Iwata	2-0	Juntendo University	Júbilo Iwata Stadium
JST (UTC+09)

19 December 1999 4th Round	Júbilo Iwata	3-0	FC Tokyo	Kagoshima Kamoike Stadium
JST (UTC+09)

23 December 1999 Quarterfinals	Júbilo Iwata	0-1	Nagoya Grampus Eight	Kumamoto Athletics Stadium
JST (UTC+09)

=== J.League Cup ===
1st Round	bye

12 June 1999 2nd Round-1	Avispa Fukuoka	1-1	Júbilo Iwata	Hakatanomori Football Stadium
JST (UTC+09)

19 June 1999 2nd Round-2	Júbilo Iwata	1-0 (2-1 agg.)	Avispa Fukuoka	Júbilo Iwata Stadium
JST (UTC+09)

20 July 1999 Quarterfinals-1	Kashiwa Reysol	1-1	Júbilo Iwata	Hitachi Kashiwa Soccer Stadium
JST (UTC+09)

24 July 1999 Quarterfinals-2	Júbilo Iwata	0-2 (1-3 agg.)	Kashiwa Reysol	Kagoshima Kamoike Stadium
JST (UTC+09)

== Player statistics ==
No.	Pos.	Nat.	Player	D.o.B. (Age)	Height / Weight	J.League 1		Emperor's Cup		J.League Cup		Total	
No.	Pos.	Nat.	Player	D.o.B. (Age)	Height / Weight	Apps	Goals	Apps	Goals	Apps	Goals	Apps	Goals
1	GK	(Japan)	Yushi Ozaki	March 24, 1969 (aged 29)	cm / kg	11	0						
2	DF	(Japan)	Hideto Suzuki	October 7, 1974 (aged 24)	cm / kg	28	3						
3	DF	(Japan)	Takuma Koga	April 30, 1969 (aged 29)	cm / kg	8	0						
4	DF	(Brazil)	Adílson Batista	March 16, 1968 (aged 30)	cm / kg	7	0						
5	DF	(Japan)	Makoto Tanaka	August 8, 1975 (aged 23)	cm / kg	16	0						
6	MF	(Japan)	Toshihiro Hattori	September 23, 1973 (aged 25)	cm / kg	29	0						
7	MF	(Japan)	Hiroshi Nanami	November 28, 1972 (aged 26)	cm / kg	15	4						
8	MF	(Japan)	Daisuke Oku	February 7, 1976 (aged 23)	cm / kg	28	7						
9	FW	(Japan)	Masashi Nakayama	September 23, 1967 (aged 31)	cm / kg	23	6						
10	MF	(Japan)	Toshiya Fujita	October 4, 1971 (aged 27)	cm / kg	29	4						
11	MF	(Japan)	Kiyokazu Kudo	June 21, 1974 (aged 24)	cm / kg	20	0						
12	GK	(Japan)	Tomoaki Ōgami	June 7, 1970 (aged 28)	cm / kg	20	0						
13	FW	(Japan)	Nobuo Kawaguchi	April 10, 1975 (aged 23)	cm / kg	18	1						
14	DF	(Japan)	Takahiro Yamanishi	April 2, 1976 (aged 22)	cm / kg	11	0						
15	MF	(Japan)	Akira Konno	September 12, 1974 (aged 24)	cm / kg	1	0						
16	GK	(Japan)	Hiroki Kobayashi	May 24, 1977 (aged 21)	cm / kg	0	0						
17	DF	(Japan)	Koji Maeda	February 3, 1969 (aged 30)	cm / kg	15	1						
18	FW	(Japan)	Norihisa Shimizu	October 4, 1976 (aged 22)	cm / kg	17	1						
19	FW	(Japan)	Naohiro Takahara	June 4, 1979 (aged 19)	cm / kg	21	9						
20	DF	(Japan)	Jo Kanazawa	July 9, 1976 (aged 22)	cm / kg	12	0						
21	GK	(Japan)	Hiromasa Yamamoto	June 5, 1979 (aged 19)	cm / kg	0	0						
22	DF	(Japan)	Yoshinobu Minowa	June 2, 1976 (aged 22)	cm / kg	0	0						
23	MF	(Japan)	Takashi Fukunishi	September 1, 1976 (aged 22)	cm / kg	27	10						
24	MF	(Japan)	Koji Sakamoto	December 3, 1978 (aged 20)	cm / kg	0	0						
25	DF	(Japan)	Yasushi Kita	April 25, 1978 (aged 20)	cm / kg	3	0						
26	MF	(Japan)	Norihiro Nishi	May 9, 1980 (aged 18)	cm / kg	13	4						
27	DF	(Japan)	Hideyuki Taizawa	May 2, 1979 (aged 19)	cm / kg	0	0						
28	DF	(Japan)	Tomoki Yamada	July 13, 1979 (aged 19)	cm / kg	0	0						
29	MF	(Japan)	Takahiro Kawamura	October 4, 1979 (aged 19)	cm / kg	0	0						
30	MF	(Japan)	Kazuki Kuranuki	November 10, 1978 (aged 20)	cm / kg	0	0						
31	GK	(Japan)	Go Kaburaki	August 26, 1977 (aged 21)	cm / kg	0	0						
32	FW	(Russia)	Dmitri Radchenko	December 2, 1970 (aged 28)	cm / kg	5	0						
33	MF	(Paraguay)	Roberto Torres	April 6, 1972 (aged 26)	cm / kg	1	0						
34	DF	(Japan)	Masahiro Ando	April 2, 1972 (aged 26)	cm / kg	4	0						
35	MF	(Japan)	Fumitake Miura	August 12, 1970 (aged 28)	cm / kg	5	1						

== Other pages ==
- (in Japanese) J.League official site
