= 1999 Asian Super Cup =

- Event: 1999 Asian Super Cup
Júbilo Iwata	Ittihad
2	2

First leg
Júbilo Iwata	Ittihad
1	0
- Date: 22 October 1999
- Venue: Júbilo Iwata Stadium, Iwata, Shizuoka, Japan

Second leg
Ittihad	Júbilo Iwata
2	1
- Date: 19 November 1999
- Venue: Prince Abdullah al-Faisal Stadium, Jeddah, Saudi Arabia

The 1999 Asian Super Cup was the 5th Asian Super Cup, a football match played between the winners of the previous season's Asian Club Championship and Asian Cup Winners Cup competitions. The 1999 competition was contested by Júbilo Iwata of Japan, who won the 1998–99 Asian Club Championship, and Al Ittihad of Saudi Arabia, the winners of the 1998–99 Asian Cup Winners' Cup.

== Route to the Super Cup ==
=== Júbilo Iwata ===
Opponents	Round	Score^{1}	Júbilo Iwata goalscorers
(Hong Kong) Instant Dict	First round	7–0	?
(Myanmar) Finance and Revenue	Second round	4–0 ^{2}	?
(South Korea) Pohang Steelers	Quarterfinals	1–1	Masashi Nakayama 28'
(China) Dalian Wanda	Quarterfinals	0–2	
(South Korea) Busan Daewoo Royals	Quarterfinals	2–0	Daisuke Oku 63', Toshiya Fujita 90'
(United Arab Emirates) Al-Ain	Semifinals	2–2 (aet, 2 PK 4)	Makoto Tanaka 15', Toshiya Fujita 37'
(Iran) Esteghlal	Final	2–1	Hideto Suzuki 36', Masashi Nakayama 45'

^{1}Júbilo Iwata goals always recorded first.
^{2} The match was played over one leg by mutual agreement.

=== Al Ittihad ===
Opponents	Round	Score^{1}	Al Ittihad goalscorers
(Qatar) Al Ahly	Second round	7–1	?
(Uzbekistan) Pakhtakor	Quarterfinals	4–0	?
(Iraq) Al Talaba	Semifinals	3–1	Mohammed Al Sahafi 20', Dalian Atkinson 25', Ahmed Bahja 90'
(South Korea) Chunnam Dragons	Final	3–2 (aet)	Ahmed Bahja 10' (p) 105' (p), Mohammed Hawsawi 84'

^{1} Al Ittihad goals always recorded first.

== Game summary ==
Team 1	Agg.	Team 2	1st leg	2nd leg
Júbilo Iwata (Japan)	2–2 (a)	(Saudi Arabia) Al Ittihad	1–0	1–2

=== First leg ===
22 October 1999

Júbilo Iwata (Japan)	1–0	(Saudi Arabia) Al Ittihad
Masashi Nakayama 63'

Júbilo Iwata Stadium, Iwata, Shizuoka
Referee: Shamsul Maidin (Singapore)

=== Second leg ===
19 November 1999

Al Ittihad (Saudi Arabia)	2–1	(Japan) Júbilo Iwata
Hasan Al Yami 78'; Mohammad Haider 90'		Masashi Nakayama 58'

Prince Abdullah al-Faisal Stadium, Jeddah
Referee: Ali Bujsaim ( United Arab Emirates)
