= Yushi Ozaki =

Japanese footballer

Yushi Ozaki 尾﨑 勇史
Personal information
- Full name: Yushi Ozaki
- Date of birth: March 24, 1969 (age 57)
- Place of birth: Mie, Japan
- Height: 1.86 m (6 ft 1 in)
- Position: Goalkeeper

Youth career
- 1984–1986: Yokkaichi Chuo Kogyo High School

Senior career*
Years	Team	Apps	(Gls)
1987–2000	Júbilo Iwata	41	(0)
2000–2001	Avispa Fukuoka	10	(0)
2002–2003	Sanfrecce Hiroshima	2	(0)
Total		53	(0)
Medal record
Júbilo Iwata
Winner	Japan Soccer League	1987/88
Winner	J1 League	1997
Winner	J1 League	1999
Runner-up	J1 League	1998
Runner-up	JSL Cup	1989
Winner	J.League Cup	1998
Runner-up	J.League Cup	1994
Runner-up	J.League Cup	1997
Runner-up	Emperor's Cup	1989
- * Club domestic league appearances and goals

Yushi Ozaki (尾﨑 勇史, Ozaki Yūshi; born March 24, 1969) is a former Japanese football player.

== Playing career ==
Ozaki was born in Mie Prefecture on March 24, 1969. After graduating from high school, he joined Yamaha Motors (later Júbilo Iwata) in 1987. However he could hardly play in the match behind Shinichi Morishita until early 1990s and Tomoaki Ogami in late 1990s. From late 1999, he became a regular goalkeeper and the club won the champions in 1999 J1 League. However the club gained Arno van Zwam in June 2000 and Ozaki lost his regular position. In November 2000, he moved to Avispa Fukuoka. He battles with Nobuyuki Kojima and Hideki Tsukamoto for the position and he played in 10 matches. In 2002, he moved to Sanfrecce Hiroshima. However he could hardly play in the match behind Takashi Shimoda. He retired end of 2003 season.

== Club statistics ==
Club performance			League		Cup		League Cup		Total	
Season	Club	League	Apps	Goals	Apps	Goals	Apps	Goals	Apps	Goals
Japan			League		Emperor's Cup		J.League Cup		Total	
1987/88	Yamaha Motors	JSL Division 1	0	0					0	0
1988/89	Yamaha Motors	JSL Division 1	0	0					0	0
1989/90	Yamaha Motors	JSL Division 1	0	0					0	0
1990/91	Yamaha Motors	JSL Division 1	2	0			0	0	2	0
1991/92	Yamaha Motors	JSL Division 1	1	0			0	0	1	0
1992	Yamaha Motors	Football League	0	0			-		0	0
1993	Yamaha Motors	Football League	2	0	0	0	-		2	0
1994	Júbilo Iwata	J1 League	11	0	0	0	0	0	11	0
1995	Júbilo Iwata	J1 League	0	0	0	0	-		0	0
1996	Júbilo Iwata	J1 League	0	0	0	0	0	0	0	0
1997	Júbilo Iwata	J1 League	1	0	0	0	0	0	1	0
1998	Júbilo Iwata	J1 League	0	0	0	0	0	0	0	0
1999	Júbilo Iwata	J1 League	11	0	3	0	4	0	18	0
2000	Júbilo Iwata	J1 League	13	0	0	0	0	0	13	0
2000	Avispa Fukuoka	J1 League	0	0	0	0	0	0	0	0
2001	Avispa Fukuoka	J1 League	10	0	0	0	3	0	13	0
2002	Sanfrecce Hiroshima	J1 League	2	0	0	0	0	0	2	0
2003	Sanfrecce Hiroshima	J2 League	0	0	0	0	-		0	0
Total			53	0	3	0	7	0	63	0
