= 2000 Júbilo Iwata season =

Júbilo Iwata
2000 season
- Manager: Gjoko Hadžievski; Masakazu Suzuki
- Stadium: Júbilo Iwata Stadium
- J.League 1: 4th
- Emperor's Cup: Quarterfinals
- J.League Cup: Quarterfinals
- Top goalscorer: Masashi Nakayama (20)
| Home colours | Away colours |

2000 Júbilo Iwata season

== Competitions ==
| Competitions | Position |
|---|---|
| J.League 1 | 4th / 16 clubs (Note: Although Júbilo Iwata finished second in the aggregate table, it did not win either of the two stages (nor did first-place finishers Kashiwa Reysol) and thus did not advance to the championship playoff.) |
| Emperor's Cup | Quarterfinals |
| J.League Cup | Quarterfinals |

== Domestic results ==
=== J.League 1 ===
| 11 March 2000 1-1 | Júbilo Iwata | 0-1 (GG) (a.e.t.) | Kashiwa Reysol | Júbilo Iwata Stadium |
| JST (UTC+09) |

| 18 March 2000 1-2 | Nagoya Grampus Eight | 0-1 | Júbilo Iwata | Mizuho Athletic Stadium |
| JST (UTC+09) |

| 25 March 2000 1-3 | Yokohama F. Marinos | 1-3 | Júbilo Iwata | International Stadium Yokohama |
| JST (UTC+09) |

| 1 April 2000 1-4 | Júbilo Iwata | 3-1 | Cerezo Osaka | Júbilo Iwata Stadium |
| JST (UTC+09) |

| 5 April 2000 1-5 | FC Tokyo | 3-2 | Júbilo Iwata | Tokyo National Stadium |
| JST (UTC+09) |

| 8 April 2000 1-6 | Júbilo Iwata | 2-1 | Avispa Fukuoka | Júbilo Iwata Stadium |
| JST (UTC+09) |

| 15 April 2000 1-7 | JEF United Ichihara | 2-3 | Júbilo Iwata | Ichihara Seaside Stadium |
| JST (UTC+09) |

| 24 May 2000 1-8 | Júbilo Iwata | 1-0 | Vissel Kobe | Júbilo Iwata Stadium |
| JST (UTC+09) |

| 29 April 2000 1-9 | Verdy Kawasaki | 2-3 (GG) (a.e.t.) | Júbilo Iwata | Niigata City Athletic Stadium |
| JST (UTC+09) |

| 3 May 2000 1-10 | Kawasaki Frontale | 1-5 | Júbilo Iwata | Todoroki Athletics Stadium |
| JST (UTC+09) |

| 6 May 2000 1-11 | Júbilo Iwata | 2-3 (GG) (a.e.t.) | Kashima Antlers | Júbilo Iwata Stadium |
| JST (UTC+09) |

| 13 May 2000 1-12 | Gamba Osaka | 2-1 | Júbilo Iwata | Osaka Expo '70 Stadium |
| JST (UTC+09) |

| 17 May 2000 1-13 | Júbilo Iwata | 3-4 (GG) (a.e.t.) | Sanfrecce Hiroshima | Júbilo Iwata Stadium |
| JST (UTC+09) |

| 20 May 2000 1-14 | Kyoto Purple Sanga | 2-3 (GG) (a.e.t.) | Júbilo Iwata | Kagoshima Kamoike Stadium |
| JST (UTC+09) |

| 27 May 2000 1-15 | Júbilo Iwata | 0-2 | Shimizu S-Pulse | Júbilo Iwata Stadium |
| JST (UTC+09) |

| 24 June 2000 2-1 | Kashiwa Reysol | 2-1 | Júbilo Iwata | Kashiwanoha Park Stadium |
| JST (UTC+09) |

| 1 July 2000 2-2 | Júbilo Iwata | 5-1 | Nagoya Grampus Eight | Júbilo Iwata Stadium |
| JST (UTC+09) |

| 8 July 2000 2-3 | Kashima Antlers | 2-1 | Júbilo Iwata | Kashima Soccer Stadium |
| JST (UTC+09) |

| 15 July 2000 2-4 | Júbilo Iwata | 3-1 | Kawasaki Frontale | Júbilo Iwata Stadium |
| JST (UTC+09) |

| 22 July 2000 2-5 | Júbilo Iwata | 2-0 | Verdy Kawasaki | Júbilo Iwata Stadium |
| JST (UTC+09) |

| 26 July 2000 2-6 | Vissel Kobe | 2-3 | Júbilo Iwata | Kobe Universiade Memorial Stadium |
| JST (UTC+09) |

| 29 July 2000 2-7 | Júbilo Iwata | 3-1 | JEF United Ichihara | Júbilo Iwata Stadium |
| JST (UTC+09) |

| 5 August 2000 2-8 | Cerezo Osaka | 3-0 | Júbilo Iwata | Osaka Nagai Stadium |
| JST (UTC+09) |

| 12 August 2000 2-9 | Júbilo Iwata | 4-0 | Yokohama F. Marinos | Júbilo Iwata Stadium |
| JST (UTC+09) |

| 19 August 2000 2-10 | Avispa Fukuoka | 2-1 | Júbilo Iwata | Hakatanomori Football Stadium |
| JST (UTC+09) |

| 8 November 2000 2-11 | Júbilo Iwata | 2-0 | FC Tokyo | Júbilo Iwata Stadium |
| JST (UTC+09) |

| 11 November 2000 2-12 | Shimizu S-Pulse | 1-0 (GG) (a.e.t.) | Júbilo Iwata | Nihondaira Sports Stadium |
| JST (UTC+09) |

| 18 November 2000 2-13 | Júbilo Iwata | 3-2 | Kyoto Purple Sanga | Júbilo Iwata Stadium |
| JST (UTC+09) |

| 23 November 2000 2-14 | Sanfrecce Hiroshima | 0-3 | Júbilo Iwata | Hiroshima Big Arch |
| JST (UTC+09) |

| 26 November 2000 2-15 | Júbilo Iwata | 4-0 | Gamba Osaka | Júbilo Iwata Stadium |
| JST (UTC+09) |

=== Emperor's Cup ===
| 1st Round | bye |

| 2nd Round | bye |

| 10 December 2000 3rd Round | Júbilo Iwata | 5-0 | Aichi Gakuin University | Júbilo Iwata Stadium |
| JST (UTC+09) |

| 17 December 2000 4th Round | Júbilo Iwata | 2-0 | Nagoya Grampus Eight | Mizuho Athletic Stadium |
| JST (UTC+09) |

| 23 December 2000 Quarterfinals | Júbilo Iwata | 0-1 (GG) (a.e.t.) | Gamba Osaka | Sendai Stadium |
| JST (UTC+09) |

=== J.League Cup ===
| 1st Round | bye |

| 5 July 2000 2nd Round-1 | Gamba Osaka | 0-1 | Júbilo Iwata | Osaka Expo '70 Stadium |
| JST (UTC+09) |

| 12 July 2000 2nd Round-2 | Júbilo Iwata | 1-2 (GG) (a.e.t.) (2-2 agg.) (3-2 p) | Gamba Osaka | Júbilo Iwata Stadium |
| JST (UTC+09) |

| 30 August 2000 Quarterfinals-1 | Júbilo Iwata | 1-1 | Kyoto Purple Sanga | Júbilo Iwata Stadium |
| JST (UTC+09) |

| 6 September 2000 Quarterfinals-2 | Kyoto Purple Sanga | 2-1 (GG) (a.e.t.) (3-2 agg.) | Júbilo Iwata | Nishikyogoku Athletic Stadium |
| JST (UTC+09) |

== Player statistics ==
| No. | Pos. | Nat. | Player | D.o.B. (Age) | Height / Weight | J.League 1 | | Emperor's Cup | | J.League Cup | | Total | |
| No. | Pos. | Nat. | Player | D.o.B. (Age) | Height / Weight | Apps | Goals | Apps | Goals | Apps | Goals | Apps | Goals |
|---|---|---|---|---|---|---|---|---|---|---|---|---|---|
| 1 | GK | (Japan) | Yushi Ozaki | March 24, 1969 (aged 30) | cm / kg | 13 | 0 | | | | | | |
| 2 | DF | (Japan) | Hideto Suzuki | October 7, 1974 (aged 25) | cm / kg | 29 | 0 | | | | | | |
| 3 | DF | (Japan) | Go Oiwa | June 23, 1972 (aged 27) | cm / kg | 1 | 0 | | | | | | |
| 4 | DF | (Japan) | Masami Ihara | September 18, 1967 (aged 32) | cm / kg | 20 | 1 | | | | | | |
| 5 | DF | (Japan) | Makoto Tanaka | August 8, 1975 (aged 24) | cm / kg | 26 | 1 | | | | | | |
| 6 | MF | (Japan) | Toshihiro Hattori | September 23, 1973 (aged 26) | cm / kg | 25 | 2 | | | | | | |
| 7 | MF | (Japan) | Fumitake Miura | August 12, 1970 (aged 29) | cm / kg | 21 | 0 | | | | | | |
| 8 | MF | (Japan) | Daisuke Oku | February 7, 1976 (aged 24) | cm / kg | 30 | 4 | | | | | | |
| 9 | FW | (Japan) | Masashi Nakayama | September 23, 1967 (aged 32) | cm / kg | 29 | 20 | | | | | | |
| 10 | MF | (Japan) | Toshiya Fujita | October 4, 1971 (aged 28) | cm / kg | 30 | 8 | | | | | | |
| 11 | MF | (Japan) | Kiyokazu Kudo | June 21, 1974 (aged 25) | cm / kg | 0 | 0 | | | | | | |
| 12 | GK | (Japan) | Tomoaki Ōgami | June 7, 1970 (aged 29) | cm / kg | 2 | 0 | | | | | | |
| 13 | FW | (Japan) | Nobuo Kawaguchi | April 10, 1975 (aged 24) | cm / kg | 20 | 3 | | | | | | |
| 14 | DF | (Japan) | Takahiro Yamanishi | April 2, 1976 (aged 23) | cm / kg | 18 | 0 | | | | | | |
| 15 | DF | (Japan) | Masahiro Ando | April 2, 1972 (aged 27) | cm / kg | 0 | 0 | | | | | | |
| 16 | GK | (Japan) | Hiroki Kobayashi | May 24, 1977 (aged 22) | cm / kg | 0 | 0 | | | | | | |
| 16 | MF | (Japan) | Hiroshi Nanami | November 28, 1972 (aged 27) | cm / kg | 5 | 1 | | | | | | |
| 17 | MF | (Japan) | Naoya Saeki | December 18, 1977 (aged 22) | cm / kg | 0 | 0 | | | | | | |
| 18 | FW | (Japan) | Norihisa Shimizu | October 4, 1976 (aged 23) | cm / kg | 7 | 1 | | | | | | |
| 19 | FW | (Japan) | Naohiro Takahara | June 4, 1979 (aged 20) | cm / kg | 24 | 10 | | | | | | |
| 20 | DF | (Japan) | Jo Kanazawa | July 9, 1976 (aged 23) | cm / kg | 10 | 0 | | | | | | |
| 21 | GK | (Japan) | Hiromasa Yamamoto | June 5, 1979 (aged 20) | cm / kg | 0 | 0 | | | | | | |
| 22 | DF | (Japan) | Yoshinobu Minowa | June 2, 1976 (aged 23) | cm / kg | 0 | 0 | | | | | | |
| 23 | MF | (Japan) | Takashi Fukunishi | September 1, 1976 (aged 23) | cm / kg | 27 | 5 | | | | | | |
| 24 | FW | (Japan) | Ryoichi Maeda | October 9, 1981 (aged 18) | cm / kg | 1 | 0 | | | | | | |
| 25 | DF | (Japan) | Yasushi Kita | April 25, 1978 (aged 21) | cm / kg | 0 | 0 | | | | | | |
| 25 | MF | (Serbia and Montenegro) | Aleksandar Živković | July 28, 1977 (aged 22) | cm / kg | 11 | 2 | | | | | | |
| 26 | MF | (Japan) | Norihiro Nishi | May 9, 1980 (aged 19) | cm / kg | 19 | 3 | | | | | | |
| 27 | FW | (Japan) | Tomoaki Seino | September 29, 1981 (aged 18) | cm / kg | 0 | 0 | | | | | | |
| 28 | MF | (Japan) | Shingo Kumabayashi | June 23, 1981 (aged 18) | cm / kg | 0 | 0 | | | | | | |
| 29 | MF | (Japan) | Takahiro Kawamura | October 4, 1979 (aged 20) | cm / kg | 0 | 0 | | | | | | |
| 30 | MF | (Paraguay) | Roberto Torres | April 6, 1972 (aged 27) | cm / kg | 0 | 0 | | | | | | |
| 30 | GK | (Netherlands) | Arno van Zwam | September 16, 1969 (aged 30) | cm / kg | 15 | 0 | | | | | | |
| 31 | GK | (Japan) | Daisuke Matsushita | October 31, 1981 (aged 18) | cm / kg | 0 | 0 | | | | | | |
| 32 | FW | (Russia) | Dmitri Radchenko | December 2, 1970 (aged 29) | cm / kg | 17 | 4 | | | | | | |
