= 2004 Japanese Super Cup =

Yokohama F. Marinos	Júbilo Iwata
1	1
- Date: March 6, 2004
- Venue: National Stadium, Tokyo
- Attendance: 30,158

2004 Japanese Super Cup was the Japanese Super Cup competition. The match was played at National Stadium in Tokyo on March 6, 2004. Júbilo Iwata won the championship.

== Match details ==
March 6, 2004

Yokohama F. Marinos	1–1	Júbilo Iwata
Oku 64'		Fukunishi 85'
Penalties
Dutra (penalty scored); Endō (penalty missed); Kubo (penalty missed); Nakanishi (penalty scored)	2–4	Gral (penalty scored); Fukunishi (penalty missed); Suzuki (penalty scored); Nanami (penalty scored); Hattori (penalty scored)

National Stadium
Attendance: 30,158
