= 2003 Japanese Super Cup =

Júbilo Iwata	Kyoto Purple Sanga
3	0
- Date: March 1, 2003
- Venue: National Stadium, Tokyo
- Attendance: 22,904

2003 Japanese Super Cup was the Japanese Super Cup competition. The match was played at National Stadium in Tokyo on March 1, 2003. Júbilo Iwata won the championship. This was also the first Super Cup match pitting two teams from outside the Kantō region.

== Match details ==
March 1, 2003
13:33

Júbilo Iwata	3–0	Kyoto Purple Sanga
Fujita 62'; Gral 73', 86'	Report

National Stadium, Tokyo
Attendance: 22,904
Referee: Joji Kashihara
