= 1998–99 Asian Club Championship =

18th edition of premier club football tournament organized by the AFC

1998–1999 AFC Champions League Elite
Tournament details
- Dates: August 1998 – April 1999
- Teams: 32
- Venue(s): Final host: Azadi Stadium,Tehran,Iran

Final positions
- Champions: (Japan) Júbilo Iwata (1st title)
- Runners-up: (Iran) Esteghlal
- Third place: (United Arab Emirates) Al-Ain
- Fourth place: (China) Dalian Wanda

Tournament statistics
- Matches played: 54
- Goals scored: 184 (3.41 per match)
- Best player: Seydou Traoré
- Fair play award: (Japan) Júbilo Iwata

The 1998–99 Asian Club Championship was the 18th edition of the annual international club football competition held in the AFC region (Asia). It determined that year's club champion of association football in Asia.

Júbilo Iwata of Japan won the final against Esteghlal and became Asian champions for the first time.

== First round ==
=== West Asia ===
Team 1	Agg.	Team 2	1st leg	2nd leg
Al-Quwa Al-Jawiya (Iraq)	9–0^{1}	(Palestine) Khidmat Rafah	7–0	2–0
Al-Ain (United Arab Emirates)	7–2	Oman	5–2	2–0
Al-Ansar (Lebanon)	3–3 (a)	(Qatar) Al-Arabi	1–0	2–3
West Riffa (Bahrain)	2–3	(Yemen) Al-Wahda	2–0	0–3(aet)
Al-Salmiya (Kuwait)	2–3	(Saudi Arabia) Al-Hilal	0–0	2–3
Köpetdag Aşgabat (Turkmenistan)	4–4^{2}	(Kazakhstan) FC Irtysh	4–1	0–3
Vakhsh Qurghonteppa (Tajikistan)	w/o^{3}	(Uzbekistan) FK Neftchy Farg'ona		
Esteghlal (Iran)	bye			

^{1} Both legs were played in Baghdad, Iraq by mutual agreement.
^{2} FC Irtysh were ejected from the competition for using two ineligible players.
^{3} FK Neftchy Farg'ona withdrew.

=== East Asia ===
Team 1	Agg.	Team 2	1st leg	2nd leg
Pohang Steelers (South Korea)	6–0	(Vietnam) Cảng Sài Gòn	2–0	4–0
Singapore Armed Forces	2–4	(Malaysia) Selangor FA^{1}	1–4	1–0
Instant-Dict FC (Hong Kong)	0–7	(Japan) Júbilo Iwata	0–3	0–4
BEC Tero Sasana^{2} (Thailand)	6–1	(Nepal) Three Star Club	6–1	n/p^{3}
Dalian Wanda (China)	6–0	(India) East Bengal Club	6–0	0–0
Club Valencia (Maldives)	0–6	(South Korea) Busan Daewoo Royals	0–2	0–4
Allied Bank (Pakistan)	w/o^{4}	(Sri Lanka) Saunders SC		
Finance and Revenue (Myanmar)	bye^{5}			

^{1} Selangor FA were entered after Penang, who had beaten them for the championship, withdrew due to excessive travel costs.
^{2} BEC Tero Sasana finished fourth, but were entered after the three clubs who finished above them for the championship withdrew due to excessive travel costs.
^{3} The match was played over one leg by mutual agreement.
^{4} Allied Bank Limited FC withdrew.
^{5} Finance and Revenue were drawn against the representatives of Indonesia, where the 1997/98 season was abandoned and the championship withheld due to political and economic turmoil in the country.

== Round of 16 ==
=== West Asia ===
Team 1	Agg.	Team 2	1st leg	2nd leg
Al-Quwa Al-Jawiya (Iraq)	1–3	(Iran) Esteghlal	1–1	0–2
Al-Ain (United Arab Emirates)	3–2	(Lebanon) Al-Ansar	3–1	0–1
Al-Wahda (Yemen)	2–6	(Saudi Arabia) Al-Hilal	2–2	0–4
Vakhsh Qurghonteppa (Tajikistan)	0–6	(Turkmenistan) Köpetdag Aşgabat	0–1	0–5

=== East Asia ===
Team 1	Agg.	Team 2	1st leg	2nd leg
Dalian Wanda (China)	3–1	(Thailand) BEC Tero Sasana	3–0	0–1
Júbilo Iwata (Japan)	4–0	(Myanmar) Finance and Revenue	4–0	n/p^{1}
Saunders SC (Sri Lanka)	1–9	(South Korea) Busan Daewoo Royals	1–4	0–5
Pohang Steelers (South Korea)	10–1	(Malaysia) Selangor FA	6–0	4–1

^{1} The match was played over one leg by mutual agreement.

== Quarterfinals ==
=== West Asia ===
Team	Pld	W	D	L	GF	GA	GD	Pts
(United Arab Emirates) Al-Ain	3	2	0	1	7	2	+5	6
(Iran) Esteghlal	3	2	0	1	3	2	+1	6
(Saudi Arabia) Al-Hilal	3	1	0	2	5	5	0	3
(Turkmenistan) Köpetdag Aşgabat	3	1	0	2	4	10	−6	3

25 February 1999

Al-Ain (United Arab Emirates)	6–1	(Turkmenistan) Köpetdag Aşgabat
Majed Hamad 5' 80'; Abdullah Shila 14' 41'; Abédi Pelé 55'; Helal Saeed (8?)		Vladimir Bairamov 20'

Al Ain, Abu Dhabi, UAE

25 February 1999

Al-Hilal (Saudi Arabia)	1–2	(Iran) Esteghlal
Bashar Abdullah 47'		Farhad Majidi 13'; Sirous Dinmohammadi 40'

Al Ain, Abu Dhabi, UAE

27 February 1999

Al-Ain (United Arab Emirates)	0–1	(Iran) Esteghlal
		Alireza Akbarpour 70'

Al Ain, Abu Dhabi, UAE

27 February 1999

Al-Hilal (Saudi Arabia)	4–2	(Turkmenistan) Köpetdag Aşgabat
Elijah Litana 17'; Nawaf Al-Temyat 21'; Abdullah Al-Dossary 41'; Sami Al-Jaber 62' (pen.)		Azat Kuldjaqazov 14'; Vladimir Bairamov 31'

Al Ain, Abu Dhabi, UAE

1 March 1999

Al-Ain (United Arab Emirates)	1–0	(Saudi Arabia) Al-Hilal
Garib Harib 68'

Al Ain, Abu Dhabi, UAE

1 March 1999

Esteghlal (Iran)	0–1	(Turkmenistan) Köpetdag Aşgabat
		Vladimir Khalikov 72'

Al Ain, Abu Dhabi, UAE

=== East Asia ===
Team	Pld	W	D	L	GF	GA	GD	Pts
(China) Dalian Wanda	3	1	2	0	5	3	+2	5
(Japan) Júbilo Iwata	3	1	1	1	3	3	0	4
(South Korea) Pohang Steelers	3	0	3	0	3	3	0	3
(South Korea) Busan Daewoo Royals	3	0	2	1	3	5	−2	2

10 February 1999

Júbilo Iwata (Japan)	1–1	(South Korea) Pohang Steelers
Masashi Nakayama 28'		Park Sang-in 48'

Chongqing, China

10 February 1999

Dalian Wanda (China)	2–2	(South Korea) Busan Daewoo Royals
Hao Haidong 42'; Wang Peng 64'		Ahn Jung-Hwan 45' (pen.); Kim Jae-Young 81'

Chongqing, China

12 February 1999

Busan Daewoo Royals (South Korea)	1–1	(South Korea) Pohang Steelers
Lee Savik 17' (o.g.)		Park Sang-in 15'

Chongqing, China

12 February 1999

Dalian Wanda (China)	2–0	(Japan) Júbilo Iwata
Hao Haidong 1', 74'

Chongqing, China

14 February 1999

Busan Daewoo Royals (South Korea)	0–2	(Japan) Júbilo Iwata
		Daisuke Oku 63'; Toshiya Fujita 90'

Chongqing, China

14 February 1999

Dalian Wanda (China)	1–1	(South Korea) Pohang Steelers
Wang Peng 16'		Abbas Obeid Jassim 60'

Chongqing, China

== Semifinals ==
28 April 1999

Al-Ain (United Arab Emirates)	2–2^{(aet, 2–4 PK)}	(Japan) Júbilo Iwata
Fahd Hasan 35' 66'		Makoto Tanaka 15'; Toshiya Fujita 37'

Azadi Stadium, Tehran, Iran

28 April 1999

Dalian Wanda (China)	3–4^{(aet)}	(Iran) Esteghlal
Yan Song 60' 63'; Li Ming 77'		Mahmoud Fekri 44'; Ali Mousavi 51' 108'; Alireza Akbarpour 84'

Azadi Stadium, Tehran, Iran

== Third place match ==
30 April 1999

Al-Ain (United Arab Emirates)	3–2	(China) Dalian Wanda
Seydou Traoré 7'; Abédi Pelé 61'; Grarib Harib Farhan 80'		Yan Song 23'; Václav Němeček 44'

Azadi Stadium, Tehran, Iran

== Final ==
30 April 1999

Júbilo Iwata (Japan)	2–1	(Iran) Esteghlal
Hideto Suzuki 36'; Masashi Nakayama 45'		Sirous Dinmohammadi 66'

Azadi Stadium, Tehran, Iran
Attendance: 121,000
Referee: Omer Al-Mehannah (Saudi Arabia)

== Awards ==
Award	Player	Team
Most Valuable Player	(Burkina Faso) Seydou Traoré	(United Arab Emirates) Al-Ain
Fair Play Award	—	(Japan) Júbilo Iwata
