= 2000 Japanese Super Cup =

Júbilo Iwata	Nagoya Grampus Eight
1	1
- Date: March 4, 2000
- Venue: National Stadium, Tokyo
- Attendance: 25,063

2000 Japanese Super Cup was the Japanese Super Cup competition. The match was played at National Stadium in Tokyo on March 4, 2000. Júbilo Iwata won the championship.

== Match details ==
March 4, 2000

Júbilo Iwata	1–1	Nagoya Grampus Eight
Penalties
	3–2

National Stadium
Attendance: 25,063
