= 1998 J.League Cup =

J.League Yamazaki Nabisco Cup

Tournament details
- Country: Japan
- Teams: 20

Final positions
- Champions: Jubilo Iwata (1st title)
- Runners-up: JEF United Ichihara
- Semifinalists: Shimizu S-Pulse; Kashima Antlers

Statistics of J. League Cup, officially the '1998 J.League Yamazaki Nabisco Cup, in the 1998 season.

== Overview ==
It was contested by 20 teams, and Jubilo Iwata won the cup.

== Results ==
=== Group A ===
Pos	Team	Pld	W	D	L	GF	GA	GD	Pts	Qualification
1	Jubilo Iwata	4	3	0	1	12	5	+7	9	Semifinals
2	Urawa Red Diamonds	4	2	2	0	10	3	+7	8	
3	Verdy Kawasaki	4	2	1	1	6	4	+2	7	
4	Sanfrecce Hiroshima	4	1	1	2	3	7	−4	4	
5	Brummel Sendai	4	0	0	4	2	14	−12	0	

Source: rsssf.com

=== Group B ===
Pos	Team	Pld	W	D	L	GF	GA	GD	Pts	Qualification
1	Kashima Antlers	4	3	1	0	11	4	+7	10	Semifinals
2	Kashiwa Reysol	4	3	1	0	12	7	+5	10	
3	Avispa Fukuoka	4	1	1	2	7	9	−2	4	
4	Yokohama Marinos	4	1	0	3	7	11	−4	3	
5	Cerezo Osaka	4	0	1	3	5	11	−6	1	

Source: rsssf.com

=== Group C ===
Pos	Team	Pld	W	D	L	GF	GA	GD	Pts	Qualification
1	Shimizu S-Pulse	4	4	0	0	8	2	+6	12	Semifinals
2	Gamba Osaka	4	2	0	2	7	6	+1	6	
3	Kawasaki Frontale	4	2	0	2	4	2	+2	6	
4	Yokohama Flugels	4	1	0	3	5	8	−3	3	
5	Consadole Sapporo	4	1	0	3	5	11	−6	3	

Source: rsssf.com

=== Group D ===
Pos	Team	Pld	W	D	L	GF	GA	GD	Pts	Qualification
1	JEF United Ichihara	4	3	1	0	14	7	+7	10	Semifinals
2	Nagoya Grampus Eight	4	2	1	1	7	7	0	7	
3	Bellmare Hiratsuka	4	1	1	2	6	7	−1	4	
4	Vissel Kobe	4	1	1	2	5	8	−3	4	
5	Kyoto Purple Sanga	4	0	2	2	6	9	−3	2	

Source: rsssf.com

=== Semifinals ===
- Shimizu S-Pulse 0–2 Jubilo Iwata
- JEF United Ichihara 3–2 Kashima Antlers

=== Final ===
- Jubilo Iwata 4–0 JEF United Ichihara

Jubilo Iwata won J.League Cup for the first time.
