= 1994 J.League Cup final =

Verdy Kawasaki	Júbilo Iwata
2	0
- Date: August 6, 1994
- Venue: Kobe Universiade Memorial Stadium, Hyogo

1994 J.League Cup final was the 3rd final of the J.League Cup competition. The final was played at Kobe Universiade Memorial Stadium in Hyogo on August 6, 1994. Verdy Kawasaki won the championship.

== Match details ==
August 6, 1994

Verdy Kawasaki	2–0	Júbilo Iwata
Bentinho 34'; Bismarck 42'	Report

Kobe Universiade Memorial Stadium

Verdy Kawasaki
GK	1	(Japan) Shinkichi Kikuchi
DF	3	(Brazil) Pereira
DF	4	(Japan) Yuji Hironaga
DF	6	(Japan) Kenichiro Tokura
DF	2	(Japan) Ko Ishikawa
MF	7	(Brazil) Bismarck
MF	5	(Japan) Tetsuji Hashiratani
MF	10	(Japan) Ruy Ramos
MF	8	(Japan) Tsuyoshi Kitazawa
FW	9	(Japan) Nobuhiro Takeda	(substituted off) 77'
FW	11	(Brazil) Bentinho
Substitutes:
GK	16	(Japan) Takayuki Fujikawa
DF	12	(Japan) Tadashi Nakamura
MF	13	(Japan) Shigetoshi Hasebe
MF	14	(Japan) Hideki Nagai	(substituted on) 77'
FW	15	(Japan) Yoshinori Abe
Manager:
(Japan) Yasutaro Matsuki

Júbilo Iwata
GK	1	(Japan) Shinichi Morishita
DF	2	(Japan) Takuma Koga
DF	6	(Japan) Masahiro Endo
DF	3	(Netherlands) Paus
DF	4	(Japan) Yoshinori Higashikawa
MF	8	(Japan) Toshiya Fujita
MF	7	(Japan) Toshihiro Hattori
MF	5	(Japan) Kenji Komata
MF	10	(Netherlands) Vanenburg
FW	11	(Japan) Masanori Suzuki
FW	9	(Italy) Schillaci
Substitutes:
GK	16	(Japan) Yushi Ozaki
DF	12	(Japan) Michihisa Date
MF	13	(Japan) Tetsu Nagasawa
MF	14	(Japan) Hiroyuki Yoshida
FW	15	(Japan) Takao Oishi
Manager:
(Netherlands) Ooft

== See also ==
- 1994 J.League Cup
