= 1995 Júbilo Iwata season =

Júbilo Iwata
1995 season
- Manager: Hans Ooft
- Stadium: Júbilo Iwata Stadium
- J.League: 6th
- Emperor's Cup: 2nd Round
- Top goalscorer: League: Salvatore Schillaci (31); All: Salvatore Schillaci (31)
- Highest home attendance: 19,069 (vs Shimizu S-Pulse, 8 July 1995); 31,774 (vs JEF United Ichihara, 30 September 1995, Tokyo National Stadium)
- Lowest home attendance: 14,291 (vs Nagoya Grampus Eight, 10 May 1995); 10,554 (vs Kashiwa Reysol, 24 June 1995, Tecnoport Fukui Stadium)
- Average home league attendance: 17,313
Home colours	Away colours

1995 Júbilo Iwata season

== Review and events ==
=== League results summary ===
Overall								Home						Away					
Pld	W	D	L	GF	GA	GD	Pts	W	D	L	GF	GA	GD	W	D	L	GF	GA	GD
52	28	0	24	88	77	+11	85	18	0	8	50	28	+22	10	0	16	38	49	−11

Source: J.LEAGUE OFFICIAL RECORD & DATA 1996. ISBN 4-09-102323-1.

=== League results by round ===
J.League Suntory series (first stage)
Round	1	2	3	4	5	6	7	8	9	10	11	12	13	14	15	16	17	18	19	20	21	22	23	24	25	26
Ground	A	H	A	A	H	H	A	A	H	A	H	A	H	A	H	H	A	A	H	H	A	H	A	H	A	H
Result	L	W	W	W	W	L	L	W	W	W	L	L	W	L	W	W	L	L	W	W	L	W	W	L	L	W
Position	11	7	3	2	2	3	6	6	4	2	5	6	5	6	5	4	5	6	5	3	5	4	3	6	7	5

Source: J.LEAGUE OFFICIAL RECORD & DATA 1996. ISBN 4-09-102323-1.
A = Away; H = Home; W = Win; D = Draw; L = Loss

J.League NICOS series (second stage)
Round	1	2	3	4	5	6	7	8	9	10	11	12	13	14	15	16	17	18	19	20	21	22	23	24	25	26
Ground	A	H	A	H	A	H	A	A	H	H	A	A	H	A	H	A	H	A	H	H	A	A	H	H	A	H
Result	L	L	L	L	W	W	W	L	L	W	L	W	W	L	L	W	W	L	L	W	L	W	W	W	L	W
Position	13	14	14	14	13	11	9	10	12	9	10	9	8	10	10	8	8	10	10	9	10	10	7	7	9	9

Source: J.LEAGUE OFFICIAL RECORD & DATA 1996. ISBN 4-09-102323-1.
A = Away; H = Home; W = Win; D = Draw; L = Loss

== Competitions ==
Competitions	Position
J.League	6th / 14 clubs
Emperor's Cup	2nd round

== Domestic results ==
=== J.League ===
18 March 1995 1st-1	JEF United Ichihara	1–0	Júbilo Iwata	Ichihara Stadium
15:03 JST (UTC+09)	Vasilijević 89'	J. League		Attendance: 13,637; Referee: Tetsuya Hamana; Assistant referees: Toshiyuki Mayuzumi, Mitsuru Satō; Fourth official: Kazuya Isokawa

22 March 1995 1st-2	Júbilo Iwata	2–1	Gamba Osaka	Júbilo Iwata Stadium
18:59 JST (UTC+09)	Nakayama 12'; Schillaci 68'	J. League	Morioka 75'	Attendance: 16,078; Referee: Lutz Fröhlich; Assistant referees: Hitoshi Yamada, Yasushi Tsuchimoto; Fourth official: Tōru Nagata; Man of the Match: Toshihiro Hattori

25 March 1995 1st-3	Nagoya Grampus Eight	2–6	Júbilo Iwata	Nagoya Mizuho Athletics Stadium
15:03 JST (UTC+09)	Yonekura 35'; Durix 70'	J. League	Vanenburg 5' (pen.); Schillaci 44', 85'; Nakayama 54', 72'; Fujita 73'	Attendance: 20,660; Referee: Fumikazu Shioyazono; Assistant referees: Hideaki Harada, Takuji Fukazawa; Fourth official: Noriaki Fukunaga; Man of the Match: Masahiro Endō

29 March 1995 1st-4	Cerezo Osaka	3–4 (V-goal) (a.e.t.)	Júbilo Iwata	Osaka Nagai No.2 Stadium
19:02 JST (UTC+09)	Marquinhos 43', 89' (pen.); Morishima 48'	J. League	Fujita 25' 101'; Yonezawa 77'; Schillaci 78' (pen.)	Attendance: 10,993; Referee: Armando Perez; Assistant referees: Yasuhiro Matsuzaki, Kazuya Yanagisawa; Fourth official: Sōichirō Kaneko; Man of the Match: Toshiya Fujita

1 April 1995 1st-5	Júbilo Iwata	2–0	Urawa Red Diamonds	Júbilo Iwata Stadium
14:02 JST (UTC+09)	Nakayama 5'; Schillaci 7'	J. League		Attendance: 17,621; Referee: Keiichi Sunakawa; Assistant referees: Yū Nakamura, Takayoshi Kashino; Fourth official: Takuya Okada; Man of the Match: Dido

5 April 1995 1st-6	Júbilo Iwata	1–2	Yokohama Marinos	Júbilo Iwata Stadium
19:02 JST (UTC+09)	Schillaci 29'	J. League	Miura 53'; Omura 84'	Attendance: 17,813; Referee: Kenji Tanaka; Assistant referees: Kazuo Kakihana, Mikio Fukuoka; Fourth official: Toshiaki Futamata

8 April 1995 1st-7	Bellmare Hiratsuka	2–0	Júbilo Iwata	Hiratsuka Stadium
15:02 JST (UTC+09)	Betinho 7'; Almir 48'	J. League		Attendance: 14,630; Referee: Fumikazu Shioyazono; Assistant referees: Tetsu Karakida, Hisaharu Kitamura; Fourth official: Jōji Kashihara

12 April 1995 1st-8	Kashiwa Reysol	0–1 (V-goal) (a.e.t.)	Júbilo Iwata	Kashiwa Hitachi Stadium
19:03 JST (UTC+09)		J. League	Nanami 92'	Attendance: 13,789; Referee: Yoshimi Ogawa; Assistant referees: Masahiro Katagiri, Kōji Taniuchi; Fourth official: Atsushi Nakamura; Man of the Match: Masahiro Endō

15 April 1995 1st-9	Júbilo Iwata	1–0	Sanfrecce Hiroshima	Júbilo Iwata Stadium
19:01 JST (UTC+09)	Nakayama 20'	J. League		Attendance: 18,542; Referee: Tatsumi Ōno; Assistant referees: Naoyuki Mori, Mikio Fukuoka; Fourth official: Takuya Okada; Man of the Match: Masashi Nakayama

22 April 1995 1st-10	Shimizu S-Pulse	2–3 (V-goal) (a.e.t.)	Júbilo Iwata	Nihondaira Sports Stadium
16:04 JST (UTC+09)	Toninho 76'; Sawanobori 86'	J. League	Schillaci 30' (pen.) 116'; Ōishi 37'	Attendance: 18,432; Referee: Juan Carlos Crespi; Assistant referees: Kazuya Yanagisawa, Satoru Kawano; Fourth official: Masakazu Hōjō; Man of the Match: Toshinobu Katsuya

26 April 1995 1st-11	Júbilo Iwata	0–1 (V-goal) (a.e.t.)	Kashima Antlers	Júbilo Iwata Stadium
19:00 JST (UTC+09)		J. League	Manaka 91'	Attendance: 17,357; Referee: Hideo Kikuchi; Assistant referees: Yoshikazu Hiroshima, Yasushi Tsuchimoto; Fourth official: Toshiaki Futamata

29 April 1995 1st-12	Verdy Kawasaki	3–2 (V-goal) (a.e.t.)	Júbilo Iwata	Kawasaki Todoroki Stadium
15:03 JST (UTC+09)	Hashiratani 26'; Takeda 35'; Kitazawa 110'	J. League	Koga 20'; Fujita 68'	Attendance: 14,201; Referee: Juan Carlos Crespi; Assistant referees: Noboru Ishiyama, Toshimitsu Yoshida; Fourth official: Kazuo Shirato

3 May 1995 1st-13	Júbilo Iwata	2–1 (V-goal) (a.e.t.)	Yokohama Flügels	Júbilo Iwata Stadium
13:59 JST (UTC+09)	Schillaci 82' (pen.) 90'	J. League	Zinho 75' (pen.)	Attendance: 18,230; Referee: Armando Perez; Assistant referees: Takeshi Ōkura, Takashi Kunori; Fourth official: Tōru Nagata; Man of the Match: Dido

6 May 1995 1st-14	Gamba Osaka	5–1	Júbilo Iwata	Expo '70 Commemorative Stadium
15:02 JST (UTC+09)	Yamaguchi 26'; Gillhaus 47', 58'; 65' (o.g.); Protassov 88'	J. League	Nakayama 83'	Attendance: 17,815; Referee: Hiroyuki Umemoto; Assistant referees: Kazuya Yanagisawa, Mitsuyoshi Nakaguma; Fourth official: Tsuyoshi Miyake

10 May 1995 1st-15	Júbilo Iwata	1–0	Nagoya Grampus Eight	Júbilo Iwata Stadium
18:59 JST (UTC+09)	Fujita 71'	J. League		Attendance: 14,291; Referee: Masayoshi Okada; Assistant referees: Tetsu Karakida, Yasushi Tsuchimoto; Fourth official: Takuya Okada; Man of the Match: Toshiya Fujita

13 May 1995 1st-16	Júbilo Iwata	3–1	Cerezo Osaka	Júbilo Iwata Stadium
14:00 JST (UTC+09)	Schillaci 35', 81'; Nakayama 50'	J. League	Valdés 57'	Attendance: 18,041; Referee: Kenji Tanaka; Assistant referees: Yū Nakamura, Akio Okutani; Fourth official: Tōru Nagata; Man of the Match: Schillaci

17 June 1995 1st-17	Urawa Red Diamonds	2–1	Júbilo Iwata	Niigata Stadium
18:32 JST (UTC+09)	Bein 4'; Fukuda 35' (pen.)	J. League	Schillaci 48'	Attendance: 14,122; Referee: Hideo Kikuchi; Assistant referees: Mitsuru Satō, Kōji Taniuchi; Fourth official: Naoki Nakamura

21 June 1995 1st-18	Yokohama Marinos	3–2	Júbilo Iwata	Yokohama Mitsuzawa Football Stadium
19:00 JST (UTC+09)	Bisconti 52', 78'; Omura 57'	J. League	Fujita 37'; Endō 87'	Attendance: 13,505; Referee: Masayoshi Okada; Assistant referees: Hiroshi Fukuda, Takayoshi Kashino; Fourth official: Kazuo Shirato

24 June 1995 1st-19	Júbilo Iwata	4–1	Bellmare Hiratsuka	Tecnoport Fukui Stadium
14:03 JST (UTC+09)	Nakayama 27', 71'; Schillaci 61', 81'	J. League	Almir 35'	Attendance: 10,554; Referee: Shinichirō Obata; Assistant referees: Yasuhiro Hemmi, Kimio Izaki; Fourth official: Kazuya Takahara; Man of the Match: Masashi Nakayama

28 June 1995 1st-20	Júbilo Iwata	3–2	Kashiwa Reysol	Júbilo Iwata Stadium
19:01 JST (UTC+09)	Schillaci 10' (pen.), 62', 73'	J. League	Tanada 80'; Valdir 83'	Attendance: 17,218; Referee: Fumikazu Shioyazono; Assistant referees: Yasushi Tsuchimoto, Tōru Kamikawa; Fourth official: Takuya Okada; Man of the Match: Schillaci

1 July 1995 1st-21	Sanfrecce Hiroshima	3–1	Júbilo Iwata	Hiroshima Big Arch
18:33 JST (UTC+09)	Van Loen 2', 21', 70'	J. League	Schillaci 67'	Attendance: 16,211; Referee: Lutz Fröhlich; Assistant referees: Peter Augar, Olaf Blumenstein; Fourth official: Masahiro Katsuyama

8 July 1995 1st-22	Júbilo Iwata	2–1	Shimizu S-Pulse	Júbilo Iwata Stadium
19:01 JST (UTC+09)	Schillaci 46', 83'	J. League	Dias 49'	Attendance: 19,069; Referee: Yoshimi Ogawa; Assistant referees: Hiroshi Fukuda, Naoyuki Mori; Fourth official: Toshiaki Futamata; Man of the Match: Schillaci

12 July 1995 1st-23	Kashima Antlers	1–2	Júbilo Iwata	Kashima Soccer Stadium
19:05 JST (UTC+09)	Honda 85'	J. League	Endō 7'; Schillaci 48'	Attendance: 15,401; Referee: Tatsumi Ōno; Assistant referees: Masahiro Katagiri, Takashi Kunori; Fourth official: Toshio Itō; Man of the Match: Toshinobu Katsuya

15 July 1995 1st-24	Júbilo Iwata	0–1	Verdy Kawasaki	Júbilo Iwata Stadium
19:03 JST (UTC+09)		J. League	Kitazawa 87'	Attendance: 18,961; Referee: Yōtarō Moritsu; Assistant referees: Morihisa Yamaguchi, Mikio Fukuoka; Fourth official: Tōru Nagata

19 July 1995 1st-25	Yokohama Flügels	2–1 (V-goal) (a.e.t.)	Júbilo Iwata	Yokohama Mitsuzawa Football Stadium
19:04 JST (UTC+09)	Kuboyama 30'; Kaetsu 94'	J. League	Schillaci 62'	Attendance: 12,900; Referee: Keiichi Sunakawa; Assistant referees: Kazuhisa Osada, Hisaharu Kitamura; Fourth official: Haruo Suzuki

22 July 1995 1st-26	Júbilo Iwata	3–0	JEF United Ichihara	Júbilo Iwata Stadium
19:00 JST (UTC+09)	Nakayama 51'; Schillaci 63'; Endō 68'	J. League		Attendance: 17,703; Referee: Naotsugu Fuse; Assistant referees: Noboru Ishiyama, Kō Ōishi; Fourth official: Toshiaki Futamata; Man of the Match: Hideto Suzuki

12 August 1995 2nd-1	Nagoya Grampus Eight	4–0	Júbilo Iwata	Nagoya Mizuho Athletics Stadium
19:03 JST (UTC+09)	Okayama 13'; Ogura 27'; Stojković 61'; Durix 87'	J. League		Attendance: 22,573; Referee: Yoshitsugu Katayama; Assistant referees: Takeshi Ōkura, Kimio Izaki; Fourth official: Yukio Fujita

16 August 1995 2nd-2	Júbilo Iwata	0–2	Kashima Antlers	Júbilo Iwata Stadium
19:02 JST (UTC+09)		J. League	Kurosaki 23'; Hashimoto 74'	Attendance: 18,251; Referee: Hiroyuki Umemoto; Assistant referees: Yasuhiro Hemmi, Takayoshi Kashino; Fourth official: Tōru Nagata

19 August 1995 2nd-3	Verdy Kawasaki	1–0	Júbilo Iwata	Kawasaki Todoroki Stadium
19:03 JST (UTC+09)	17' (o.g.)	J. League		Attendance: 15,757; Referee: Zoran Petrović; Assistant referees: Kazuya Yanagisawa, Satoru Ishizawa; Fourth official: Hideaki Ishii

23 August 1995 2nd-4	Júbilo Iwata	1–2 (V-goal) (a.e.t.)	Yokohama Flügels	Júbilo Iwata Stadium
19:00 JST (UTC+09)	78' (o.g.)	J. League	Evair 2'; Miura 95'	Attendance: 16,832; Referee: Alfredo Trentalange; Assistant referees: Takashi Kunori, Mikio Fukuoka; Fourth official: Toshiaki Futamata

26 August 1995 2nd-5	Shimizu S-Pulse	0–2	Júbilo Iwata	Nihondaira Sports Stadium
19:01 JST (UTC+09)		J. League	Nakayama 35', 86'	Attendance: 20,295; Referee: Keiichi Sunakawa; Assistant referees: Takeshi Ōkura, Sōichirō Kaneko; Fourth official: Toshiyuki Asanuma; Man of the Match: Masashi Nakayama

2 September 1995 2nd-6	Júbilo Iwata	2–1	Cerezo Osaka	Júbilo Iwata Stadium
19:00 JST (UTC+09)	M. Suzuki 49'; Katsuya 74'	J. League	Morishima 26'	Attendance: 16,506; Referee: Yoshitsugu Katayama; Assistant referees: Takuji Fukazawa, Takuya Okada; Fourth official: Yoshikuni Ninomiya; Man of the Match: Hideto Suzuki

6 September 1995 2nd-7	Kashiwa Reysol	2–4	Júbilo Iwata	Kashiwa Hitachi Stadium
19:00 JST (UTC+09)	Watanabe 75'; Nelsinho 89'	J. League	Fujita 34'; Nakayama 54'; Kudō 71'; Fukunishi 83'	Attendance: 11,846; Referee: Zoran Petrović; Assistant referees: Takashi Kunori, Takayoshi Kashino; Fourth official: Kōji Sugikawa; Man of the Match: Toshihiro Hattori

9 September 1995 2nd-8	Urawa Red Diamonds	1–0	Júbilo Iwata	Urawa Komaba Stadium
18:33 JST (UTC+09)	Toninho 69'	J. League		Attendance: 22,150; Referee: Kiyoshi Ōta; Assistant referees: Kenichi Koshiyama, Kō Ōishi; Fourth official: Shigeru Kimura

13 September 1995 2nd-9	Júbilo Iwata	1–2	Sanfrecce Hiroshima	Júbilo Iwata Stadium
19:00 JST (UTC+09)	Dunga 89'	J. League	7' (o.g.); Noh 20'	Attendance: 15,669; Referee: Kenji Tanaka; Assistant referees: Masahiro Katagiri, Toshimitsu Yoshida; Fourth official: Tōru Nagata

16 September 1995 2nd-10	Júbilo Iwata	5–2	Bellmare Hiratsuka	Júbilo Iwata Stadium
19:00 JST (UTC+09)	Schillaci 20', 85'; Fujita 34'; Hattori 61' (pen.); 89' (o.g.)	J. League	Nakata 38'; Betinho 78'	Attendance: 15,672; Referee: Armando Perez; Assistant referees: Noboru Ishiyama, Takashi Kunori; Fourth official: Toshiaki Futamata; Man of the Match: Dunga

23 September 1995 2nd-11	Yokohama Marinos	2–1	Júbilo Iwata	Tokyo National Stadium
15:03 JST (UTC+09)	M. Suzuki 23'; Bisconti 71' (pen.)	J. League	Schillaci 62'	Attendance: 45,741; Referee: Kiyoshi Ōta; Assistant referees: Kazuaki Hamaguchi, Hisaharu Kitamura; Fourth official: Masao Yamanaka

27 September 1995 2nd-12	Gamba Osaka	2–3	Júbilo Iwata	Kobe Universiade Memorial Stadium
19:04 JST (UTC+09)	Gillhaus 41', 60'	J. League	Nakayama 67'; Nanami 72'; Matsubara 89'	Attendance: 7,774; Referee: Alfredo Trentalange; Assistant referees: Morihisa Yamaguchi, Satoru Kawano; Fourth official: Akira Hinayama; Man of the Match: Toshiya Fujita

30 September 1995 2nd-13	Júbilo Iwata	3–0	JEF United Ichihara	Tokyo National Stadium
15:00 JST (UTC+09)	Nakayama 30', 63'; Fujita 85'	J. League		Attendance: 31,774; Referee: Yasuhiro Matsuzaki; Assistant referees: Hiroshi Tanabe, Ichirō Inukai; Fourth official: Hide Lii; Man of the Match: Masashi Nakayama

4 October 1995 2nd-14	Kashima Antlers	1–0	Júbilo Iwata	Kashima Soccer Stadium
19:03 JST (UTC+09)	Okuno 50'	J. League		Attendance: 15,599; Referee: Zoran Petrović; Assistant referees: Hitoshi Yamada, Kenichi Koshiyama; Fourth official: Atsushi Fujigasaki

7 October 1995 2nd-15	Júbilo Iwata	2–3	Verdy Kawasaki	Júbilo Iwata Stadium
19:03 JST (UTC+09)	Nanami 33'; Matsubara 82'	J. League	Miura 56'; Alcindo 61', 79'	Attendance: 17,983; Referee: Yoshitsugu Katayama; Assistant referees: Sōichirō Kaneko, Akio Okutani; Fourth official: Takuya Okada

14 October 1995 2nd-16	Yokohama Flügels	1–3	Júbilo Iwata	Kumamoto Suizenji Stadium
14:03 JST (UTC+09)	Maezono 38'	J. League	Schillaci 11'; Nakayama 24'; Hattori 48' (pen.)	Attendance: 13,409; Referee: Naotsugu Fuse; Assistant referees: Hiroshi Tanabe, Tōru Yamashiro; Fourth official: Kōji Uehara; Man of the Match: Schillaci

18 October 1995 2nd-17	Júbilo Iwata	3–2 (V-goal) (a.e.t.)	Shimizu S-Pulse	Júbilo Iwata Stadium
19:00 JST (UTC+09)	Schillaci 39' 110'; Nakayama 66'	J. League	Marco 25'; Hasegawa 69'	Attendance: 17,976; Referee: Fumikazu Shioyazono; Assistant referees: Kazuaki Hamaguchi, Naoki Esumi; Fourth official: Tōru Nagata; Man of the Match: Toshihiro Hattori

21 October 1995 2nd-18	Cerezo Osaka	3–0	Júbilo Iwata	Kyoto Nishikyogoku Stadium
15:01 JST (UTC+09)	Fukagawa 13'; Marquinhos 82' (pen.), 83'	J. League		Attendance: 13,074; Referee: Yōtarō Moritsu; Assistant referees: Yasuhiro Hemmi, Mitsuyoshi Nakaguma; Fourth official: Hiroyuki Ishida

1 November 1995 2nd-19	Júbilo Iwata	1–1 (V-goal) (a.e.t.) (5–6 p)	Kashiwa Reysol	Júbilo Iwata Stadium
19:01 JST (UTC+09)	Schillaci 2'	J. League	Bentinho 89'	Attendance: 14,664; Referee: Armando Perez; Assistant referees: Kazuaki Hamaguchi, Naoyuki Mori; Fourth official: Takuya Okada
	Penalties
	(penalty missed) Kudō; (penalty scored) Dunga; (penalty scored) Fujita; (penalty missed) Nakayama; (penalty scored) Dido; (penalty scored) Katsuya; (penalty missed) Tanaka; (penalty scored) Koga; (penalty missed) H. Suzuki		(penalty scored) Bentinho; (penalty scored) Date; (penalty missed) Watanabe; (penalty scored) Shimotaira; (penalty missed) Sawada; (penalty scored) Ōkuma; (penalty missed) Arima; (penalty scored) Katanosaka; (penalty scored) Caio

4 November 1995 2nd-20	Júbilo Iwata	2–1	Urawa Red Diamonds	Júbilo Iwata Stadium
14:00 JST (UTC+09)	65' (o.g.); Fujita 81'	J. League	Fukunaga 11'	Attendance: 15,758; Referee: Shinichirō Obata; Assistant referees: Kimio Izaki, Masahiro Katagiri; Fourth official: Toshiaki Futamata; Man of the Match: Hideto Suzuki

8 November 1995 2nd-21	Sanfrecce Hiroshima	2–0	Júbilo Iwata	Hiroshima Stadium
19:03 JST (UTC+09)	Mori 1', 79'	J. League		Attendance: 7,194; Referee: Kazuo Kakihana; Assistant referees: Yoshikazu Hiroshima, Tōru Yamashiro; Fourth official: Kazuhiko Matsumura

11 November 1995 2nd-22	Bellmare Hiratsuka	0–1	Júbilo Iwata	Hiratsuka Stadium
15:03 JST (UTC+09)		J. League	Hattori 58' (pen.)	Attendance: 12,622; Referee: Naotsugu Fuse; Assistant referees: Kazuhisa Osada, Naoyuki Mori; Fourth official: Hisahito Okano; Man of the Match: Toshihiro Hattori

15 November 1995 2nd-23	Júbilo Iwata	3–0	Yokohama Marinos	Júbilo Iwata Stadium
19:01 JST (UTC+09)	Fujita 45'; Ōyama 73'; Kudō 89'	J. League		Attendance: 14,552; Referee: Hiroyuki Umemoto; Assistant referees: Tetsu Karakida, Takuji Fukazawa; Fourth official: Tōru Nagata; Man of the Match: Dunga

18 November 1995 2nd-24	Júbilo Iwata	1–0 (V-goal) (a.e.t.)	Gamba Osaka	Júbilo Iwata Stadium
16:02 JST (UTC+09)	Matsubara 103'	J. League		Attendance: 15,345; Referee: Jamal Al-Sharif; Assistant referees: Kazuaki Hamaguchi, Hiroyuki Izumi; Fourth official: Toshiaki Futamata; Man of the Match: Hiroshi Nanami

22 November 1995 2nd-25	JEF United Ichihara	1–0	Júbilo Iwata	Ichihara Stadium
19:03 JST (UTC+09)	Jō 80'	J. League		Attendance: 11,787; Referee: Kenji Tanaka; Assistant referees: Yū Nakamura, Tōru Kamikawa; Fourth official: Fujirō Masukura

25 November 1995 2nd-26	Júbilo Iwata	2–1 (V-goal) (a.e.t.)	Nagoya Grampus Eight	Júbilo Iwata Stadium
15:03 JST (UTC+09)	M. Suzuki 42' 106'	J. League	Nakanishi 1'	Attendance: 17,672; Referee: Yōtarō Moritsu; Assistant referees: Takashi Kunori, Mikio Fukuoka; Fourth official: Takuya Okada; Man of the Match: Hiroshi Nanami

=== Emperor's Cup ===
3 December 1995 1st Round	Júbilo Iwata	5–1	Hiroshima University	Júbilo Iwata Stadium
14:00 JST (UTC+09)	M. Suzuki 28', 56'; Hattori 73'; Vanenburg 82'; Fujita 89'		Tsutsui 68'	Attendance: 9,481

10 December 1995 2nd Round	Júbilo Iwata	0–2	Vissel Kobe	Kose Sports Park Stadium
12:02 JST (UTC+09)			Ziad 53', 69'	Attendance: 10,904

== Player statistics ==
No.	Pos	Nat	Player	Total		J-League		Emperor's Cup	
No.	Pos	Nat	Player	Apps	Goals	Apps	Goals	Apps	Goals
	GK	(Japan) JPN	Dido Havenaar	54	0	52	0	2	0
	GK	(Japan) JPN	Yūshi Ozaki	0	0	0	0	0	0
	GK	(Japan) JPN	Tomoaki Ōgami	0	0	0	0	0	0
	GK	(Japan) JPN	Yukiya Hamano	0	0	0	0	0	0
	DF	(Japan) JPN	Toshinobu Katsuya	35	1	35	1	0	0
	DF	(Netherlands) NED	André Paus	22	0	22	0	0	0
	DF	(Japan) JPN	Takeshi Yonezawa	19	1	19	1	0	0
	DF	(Japan) JPN	Takuma Koga	41	1	40	1	1	0
	DF	(Japan) JPN	Masahiro Endō	40	3	40	3	0	0
	DF	(Japan) JPN	Yasuyuki Iwasaki	2	0	2	0	0	0
	DF	(Japan) JPN	Ryōsuke Kawaguchi	0	0	0	0	0	0
	DF	(Japan) JPN	Toshihiro Hattori	42	4	40	3	2	1
	DF	(Japan) JPN	Hideto Suzuki	33	0	31	0	2	0
	DF	(Japan) JPN	Makoto Tanaka	23	0	21	0	2	0
	DF	(Japan) JPN	Takahiro Yamanishi	0	0	0	0	0	0
	MF	(Japan) JPN	Mitsunori Yoshida	24	0	24	0	0	0
	MF	(Netherlands) NED	Gerald Vanenburg	23	2	21	1	2	1
	MF	(Japan) JPN	Kenji Komata	1	0	1	0	0	0
	MF	(Japan) JPN	Toshiya Fujita	50	12	49	11	1	1
	MF	(Japan) JPN	Yasuyoshi Hanba	0	0	0	0	0	0
	MF	(Japan) JPN	Hiroshi Nanami	53	3	51	3	2	0
	MF	(Japan) JPN	Kiyokazu Kudō	17	2	15	2	2	0
	MF	(Japan) JPN	Kōji Kawada	0	0	0	0	0	0
	MF	(Japan) JPN	Daisuke Oku	0	0	0	0	0	0
	FW	(North Korea) PRK	Kim Jong-Song (Note: In J.League and domestic competitions, he was considered as a Japanese player.)	2	0	2	0	0	0
	FW	(Japan) JPN	Takao Ōishi	17	1	17	1	0	0
	FW	(Italy) ITA	Salvatore Schillaci	34	31	34	31	0	0
	FW	(Japan) JPN	Masashi Nakayama	45	18	45	18	0	0
	FW	(Japan) JPN	Masanori Suzuki	40	5	38	3	2	2
	FW	(Japan) JPN	Naohiro Ōyama	7	1	5	1	2	0
	FW	(Japan) JPN	Yoshika Matsubara	17	3	15	3	2	0
	FW	(Japan) JPN	Takashi Fukunishi	10	1	10	1	0	0
	FW	(Japan) JPN	Norihisa Shimizu	0	0	0	0	0	0
	MF	(Brazil) BRA	Dunga †	27	1	25	1	2	0

- † player(s) joined the team after the opening of this season.

== Transfers ==
In:

No.	Pos.	Nation	Player
—	GK	JPN	Dido Havenaar (from Nagoya Grampus Eight)
—	DF	JPN	Takahiro Yamanishi (from Shimizu Higashi High School)
—	MF	JPN	Hiroshi Nanami (from Juntendo University)
—	FW	JPN	Takashi Fukunishi (from Niihama Technical High School)
—	FW	JPN	Norihisa Shimizu (from Maebashi Commercial High School)
—	FW	PRK	Kim Jong-Song (from Zainichi Chosen Football Club)

Out:

No.	Pos.	Nation	Player
—	GK	JPN	Shinichi Morishita (to Kyoto Purple Sanga)
—	GK	JPN	Naoki Kikuchi
—	DF	JPN	Mamoru Kishimoto
—	DF	JPN	Masanori Higashikawa (to Honda Motor)
—	DF	JPN	Michihisa Date (to Kashiwa Reysol)
—	DF	JPN	Tetsu Nagasawa (to Honda Motor)
—	DF	JPN	Toshihiro Yoshimura (to Vissel Kobe)
—	DF	JPN	Yoshiaki Sakazaki
—	MF	BRA	Walter
—	MF	JPN	Hiroyuki Yoshida (to Fukuoka Blux)
—	MF	JPN	Tomoya Endō
—	MF	JPN	Atsushi Gotō
—	FW	JPN	Hidenori Tabata
—	FW	JPN	Tadashi Komine

== Transfers during the season ==
=== In ===
- (Brazil) Dunga (from VfB Stuttgart on June)

== Awards ==
none

== Other pages ==
- (in Japanese) J. League official site
- (in Japanese) Júbilo Iwata official site
