= 1994 Júbilo Iwata season =

Júbilo Iwata
1994 season
- Manager: Hans Ooft
- Stadium: Júbilo Iwata Stadium
- J.League: 8th
- Emperor's Cup: 1st Round
- J.League Cup: Runners-up
- Top goalscorer: League: Schillaci (9); All: Schillaci (14)
- Highest home attendance: 15,377 (vs Shimizu S-Pulse, 2 November 1994)
- Lowest home attendance: 13,529 (vs Nagoya Grampus Eight, 16 March 1994); 12,177 (vs Gamba Osaka, 23 March 1994, Kusanagi Athletic Stadium)
- Average home league attendance: 14,497
| Home colours | Away colours |

1994 Júbilo Iwata season

== Review and events ==
=== League results summary ===
| Overall | | | | | | | | Home | | | | | | Away | | | | | |
| Pld | W | D | L | GF | GA | GD | Pts | W | D | L | GF | GA | GD | W | D | L | GF | GA | GD |
|---|---|---|---|---|---|---|---|---|---|---|---|---|---|---|---|---|---|---|---|
| 44 | 20 | 0 | 24 | 56 | 69 | −13 | 60 | 13 | 0 | 9 | 34 | 30 | +4 | 7 | 0 | 15 | 22 | 39 | −17 |

Source: J.LEAGUE OFFICIAL 1995 RECORD & DATA. ISBN 4-09-102317-7.

=== League results by round ===
J.League Suntory series (first stage)
| Round | 1 | 2 | 3 | 4 | 5 | 6 | 7 | 8 | 9 | 10 | 11 | 12 | 13 | 14 | 15 | 16 | 17 | 18 | 19 | 20 | 21 | 22 |
|---|---|---|---|---|---|---|---|---|---|---|---|---|---|---|---|---|---|---|---|---|---|---|
| Ground | A | H | A | H | A | H | A | H | A | H | A | A | H | A | H | A | H | A | H | A | H | H |
| Result | L | W | L | L | W | L | L | W | W | L | L | L | W | L | W | W | W | W | L | L | L | L |
| Position | 7 | 8 | 8 | 9 | 8 | 8 | 10 | 8 | 6 | 7 | 8 | 9 | 7 | 8 | 7 | 7 | 7 | 6 | 7 | 7 | 7 | 7 |

Source: J.LEAGUE OFFICIAL 1995 RECORD & DATA. ISBN 4-09-102317-7.
A = Away; H = Home; W = Win; D = Draw; L = Loss

J.League NICOS series (second stage)
| Round | 1 | 2 | 3 | 4 | 5 | 6 | 7 | 8 | 9 | 10 | 11 | 12 | 13 | 14 | 15 | 16 | 17 | 18 | 19 | 20 | 21 | 22 |
|---|---|---|---|---|---|---|---|---|---|---|---|---|---|---|---|---|---|---|---|---|---|---|
| Ground | A | H | A | H | A | H | A | H | A | H | H | A | H | A | H | A | H | A | H | A | A | H |
| Result | W | L | L | W | L | L | W | W | L | W | W | L | W | L | L | W | W | L | W | L | L | W |
| Position | 6 | 5 | 8 | 9 | 10 | 11 | 10 | 7 | 10 | 7 | 5 | 7 | 6 | 7 | 7 | 6 | 5 | 6 | 5 | 6 | 7 | 7 |

Source: J.LEAGUE OFFICIAL 1995 RECORD & DATA. ISBN 4-09-102317-7.
A = Away; H = Home; W = Win; D = Draw; L = Loss

== Competitions ==
| Competitions | Position |
|---|---|
| J.League | 8th / 12 clubs |
| Emperor's Cup | 1st round |
| J.League Cup | Runners-up |

== Domestic results ==
=== J.League ===
==== Suntory series ====
| 12 March 1994 1st-1 | Kashima Antlers | 1–0 | Júbilo Iwata | Kashima Soccer Stadium |
| 15:04 JST (UTC+09) | Hasegawa 30' | J. League | | Attendance: 13,990; Referee: Kiyoshi Ōta; Assistant referees: Keiichi Sunakawa, Masato Nogami; Fourth official: Ichirō Inukai |

| 16 March 1994 1st-2 | Júbilo Iwata | 1–0 | Nagoya Grampus Eight | Júbilo Iwata Stadium |
| 19:01 JST (UTC+09) | Ōishi 80' | J. League | | Attendance: 13,529; Referee: Fumikazu Shioyazono; Assistant referees: Yasushi Tsuchimoto, Tetsu Karakida; Fourth official: Tōru Nagata; Man of the Match: Vanenburg |

| 19 March 1994 1st-3 | Verdy Kawasaki | 3–2 | Júbilo Iwata | Tokyo National Stadium |
| 19:03 JST (UTC+09) | Miura 3'; Takeda 22', 64' | J. League | Nakayama 36'; M. Suzuki 54' | Attendance: 54,657; Referee: Masayoshi Okada; Assistant referees: Hitoshi Yamada, Tetsu Karakida; Fourth official: Mineo Takada |

| 23 March 1994 1st-4 | Júbilo Iwata | 0–2 | Gamba Osaka | Kusanagi Athletic Stadium |
| 18:59 JST (UTC+09) | | J. League | Shimada 1'; Isogai 75' | Attendance: 12,177; Referee: Shinichirō Obata; Assistant referees: Kazuo Kakihana, Yasushi Tsuchimoto; Fourth official: Takuya Okada; Man of the Match: Masanori Suzuki |

| 26 March 1994 1st-5 | Yokohama Marinos | 2–3 | Júbilo Iwata | Yokohama Mitsuzawa Football Stadium |
| 15:01 JST (UTC+09) | Medina Bello 2'; Díaz 89' | J. League | M. Endō 23'; M. Suzuki 31'; Nakayama 36' | Attendance: 14,215; Referee: Kōetsu Kikuchi; Assistant referees: Keiichi Sunakawa, Kazuaki Hamaguchi; Fourth official: Masaki Yoshihara; Man of the Match: Masanori Suzuki |

| 2 April 1994 1st-6 | Júbilo Iwata | 1–2 | Yokohama Flügels | Júbilo Iwata Stadium |
| 14:00 JST (UTC+09) | Paus 55' | J. League | Amarilla 14'; Edu 62' | Attendance: 15,268; Referee: Yoshimi Ogawa; Assistant referees: Kazuo Kakihana, Yasushi Tsuchimoto; Fourth official: Toshiaki Futamata |

| 6 April 1994 1st-7 | Shimizu S-Pulse | 1–0 (V-goal) (a.e.t.) | Júbilo Iwata | Kusanagi Athletic Stadium |
| 19:05 JST (UTC+09) | Toninho 95' | J. League | | Attendance: 17,806; Referee: Zoran Petrović; Assistant referees: Yoshimi Ogawa, Yasuhiro Matsuzaki; Fourth official: Teruhito Kudō |

| 9 April 1994 1st-8 | Júbilo Iwata | 1–0 (V-goal) (a.e.t.) | Urawa Red Diamonds | Júbilo Iwata Stadium |
| 14:00 JST (UTC+09) | Paus 90' | J. League | | Attendance: 13,842; Referee: Hiroyuki Umemoto; Assistant referees: Kazunori Ōtoshi, Yasushi Tsuchimoto; Fourth official: Tōru Nagata; Man of the Match: Paus |

| 13 April 1994 1st-9 | JEF United Ichihara | 0–2 | Júbilo Iwata | Ichihara Stadium |
| 19:03 JST (UTC+09) | | J. League | Vanenburg 26'; Nakayama 80' (pen.) | Attendance: 9,597; Referee: Kiyoshi Ōta; Assistant referees: Yū Nakamura, Takashi Kunori; Fourth official: Fujirō Masukura; Man of the Match: Masashi Nakayama |

| 16 April 1994 1st-10 | Júbilo Iwata | 1–2 | Bellmare Hiratsuka | Júbilo Iwata Stadium |
| 14:00 JST (UTC+09) | 38' (o.g.) | J. League | Mirandinha 79'; Ōmoto 82' | Attendance: 13,929; Referee: Yōtarō Moritsu; Assistant referees: Yasushi Tsuchimoto, Kazunori Ōtoshi; Fourth official: Takuya Okada |

| 23 April 1994 1st-11 | Sanfrecce Hiroshima | 3–0 | Júbilo Iwata | Hiroshima Big Arch |
| 15:05 JST (UTC+09) | Hašek 59', 64'; Yanagimoto 76' | J. League | | Attendance: 23,144; Referee: Hiroyuki Umemoto; Assistant referees: Hiroshi Tanabe, Hideaki Harada; Fourth official: Shinji Saga |

| 27 April 1994 1st-12 | Nagoya Grampus Eight | 1–0 | Júbilo Iwata | Tokyo National Stadium |
| 19:00 JST (UTC+09) | Gotō 4' | J. League | | Attendance: 49,028; Referee: Shizuo Takada; Assistant referees: Kazuaki Hamaguchi, Hiroshi Fukuda; Fourth official: Keizō Yamazaki |

| 30 April 1994 1st-13 | Júbilo Iwata | 2–0 | Verdy Kawasaki | Júbilo Iwata Stadium |
| 19:03 JST (UTC+09) | M. Suzuki 51'; Schillaci 87' (pen.) | J. League | | Attendance: 14,906; Referee: Shinichirō Obata; Assistant referees: Yasushi Tsuchimoto, Yasuhiro Matsuzaki; Fourth official: Takuya Okada; Man of the Match: Schillaci |

| 4 May 1994 1st-14 | Gamba Osaka | 3–0 | Júbilo Iwata | Kyoto Nishikyogoku Stadium |
| 19:03 JST (UTC+09) | Aleinikov 33'; Yamaguchi 55'; Matsunami 80' | J. League | | Attendance: 12,568; Referee: Tatsumi Ōno; Assistant referees: Kazuya Yanagisawa, Kazunori Ōtoshi; Fourth official: Mitsuyoshi Nakaguma |

| 7 May 1994 1st-15 | Júbilo Iwata | 2–0 | Yokohama Marinos | Júbilo Iwata Stadium |
| 19:00 JST (UTC+09) | Paus 26'; Vanenburg 75' | J. League | | Attendance: 14,478; Referee: Kiyoshi Ōta; Assistant referees: Kazuo Kakihana, Mikio Fukuoka; Fourth official: Tōru Nagata; Man of the Match: Masahiro Endō |

| 14 May 1994 1st-16 | Yokohama Flügels | 1–2 | Júbilo Iwata | Kagoshima Kamoike Stadium |
| 18:33 JST (UTC+09) | Válber 13' | J. League | Paus 3'; Vanenburg 88' | Attendance: 15,502; Referee: Zoran Petrović; Assistant referees: Noboru Ishiyama, Tōru Yamashiro; Fourth official: Shōji Hamada; Man of the Match: Vanenburg |

| 18 May 1994 1st-17 | Júbilo Iwata | 4–2 | Shimizu S-Pulse | Júbilo Iwata Stadium |
| 19:03 JST (UTC+09) | Vanenburg 27'; Fujita 58'; Schillaci 72', 86' | J. League | Ronaldo 10'; Nagashima 43' | Attendance: 14,756; Referee: Shizuo Takada; Assistant referees: Morihisa Yamaguchi, Yasuhiro Matsuzaki; Fourth official: Toshiaki Futamata; Man of the Match: Salvatore Schillaci |

| 1 June 1994 1st-18 | Urawa Red Diamonds | 0–1 | Júbilo Iwata | Urawa Komaba Stadium |
| 19:00 JST (UTC+09) | | J. League | Yonezawa 89' | Attendance: 9,408; Referee: Zoran Petrović; Assistant referees: Takashi Kunori, Toshiyuki Mayuzumi; Fourth official: Keiji Kamiara; Man of the Match: Shinichi Morishita |

| 4 June 1994 1st-19 | Júbilo Iwata | 2–3 | JEF United Ichihara | Júbilo Iwata Stadium |
| 19:00 JST (UTC+09) | Fujita 48', 78' | J. League | Otze 56', 83' (pen.); Jō 60' | Attendance: 14,764; Referee: Shinichirō Obata; Assistant referees: Yasuhiro Matsuzaki, Mikio Fukuoka; Fourth official: Takuya Okada |

| 8 June 1994 1st-20 | Bellmare Hiratsuka | 2–1 | Júbilo Iwata | Hiratsuka Stadium |
| 19:00 JST (UTC+09) | Almir 47'; Noguchi 77' | J. League | M. Suzuki 43' | Attendance: 15,129; Referee: Shizuo Takada; Assistant referees: Keiichi Sunakawa, Masahiro Katagiri; Fourth official: Jōji Kashihara |

| 11 June 1994 1st-21 | Júbilo Iwata | 1–2 | Sanfrecce Hiroshima | Júbilo Iwata Stadium |
| 19:05 JST (UTC+09) | M. Endō 29' | J. League | Takagi 38'; Černý 89' | Attendance: 14,773; Referee: Masayoshi Okada; Assistant referees: Kazuya Yanagisawa, Yasushi Tsuchimoto; Fourth official: Tōru Nagata |

| 15 June 1994 1st-22 | Júbilo Iwata | 1–2 | Kashima Antlers | Júbilo Iwata Stadium |
| 19:03 JST (UTC+09) | Vanenburg 65' | J. League | Akita 12'; Zico 21' | Attendance: 14,634; Referee: Yoshimi Ogawa; Assistant referees: Tetsu Karakida, Kazuhisa Osada; Fourth official: Toshiaki Futamata |

==== NICOS series ====
| 10 August 1994 2nd-1 | Kashima Antlers | 2–2 (V-goal) (a.e.t.) (2–4 p) | Júbilo Iwata | Kashima Soccer Stadium |
| 19:03 JST (UTC+09) | Alcindo 10'; Akita 85' | J. League | Schillaci 9'; M. Suzuki 53' | Attendance: 16,153; Referee: Zoran Petrović; Assistant referees: Hiroshi Fukuda, Takashi Kunori; Fourth official: Junichi Suzuki; Man of the Match: Mitsunori Yoshida |
| | Penalties |
| | (penalty missed) Hasegawa; (penalty scored) Akita; (penalty scored) Yoshida; (penalty missed) Kurosaki | | (penalty scored) Vanenburg; (penalty scored) Date; (penalty scored) M. Yoshida; (penalty scored) Ōishi |

| 13 August 1994 2nd-2 | Júbilo Iwata | 2–3 (V-goal) (a.e.t.) | Nagoya Grampus Eight | Júbilo Iwata Stadium |
| 19:02 JST (UTC+09) | M. Suzuki 84'; Schillaci 87' | J. League | Lineker 52' (pen.); Jorginho 72'; Ogura 116' | Attendance: 14,592; Referee: Kōetsu Kikuchi; Assistant referees: Tetsu Karakida, Kōji Taniuchi; Fourth official: Tōru Nagata |

| 17 August 1994 2nd-3 | Verdy Kawasaki | 4–1 | Júbilo Iwata | Kawasaki Todoroki Stadium |
| 19:03 JST (UTC+09) | Bentinho 15', 81', 86'; Bismarck 42' (pen.) | J. League | Matsubara 54' | Attendance: 10,629; Referee: Kenji Tanaka; Assistant referees: Takashi Kunori, Hiroshi Tanabe; Fourth official: Kanichi Takahashi |

| 20 August 1994 2nd-4 | Júbilo Iwata | 2–2 (V-goal) (a.e.t.) (5–4 p) | Gamba Osaka | Júbilo Iwata Stadium |
| 18:59 JST (UTC+09) | Matsubara 72', 83' | J. League | Aleinikov 73'; Matsunami 89' | Attendance: 14,441; Referee: Hiroyuki Umemoto; Assistant referees: Kazuo Kakihana, Yasuhiro Hemmi; Fourth official: Takuya Okada; Man of the Match: Yoshika Matsubara |
| | Penalties |
| | (penalty scored) Ōishi; (penalty scored) M. Yoshida; (penalty scored) Date; (penalty scored) Koga; (penalty scored) Hattori | | (penalty scored) Flavio; (penalty scored) Protassov; (penalty scored) Yamaguchi; (penalty scored) Kitamura; (penalty missed) Morioka |

| 27 August 1994 2nd-5 | Yokohama Marinos | 2–1 | Júbilo Iwata | Hakatanomori Athletic Stadium |
| 19:03 JST (UTC+09) | Bisconti 39'; Díaz 44' | J. League | Vanenburg 68' | Attendance: 23,369; Referee: Shinichirō Obata; Assistant referees: Hideaki Harada, Tōru Yamashiro; Fourth official: Masatoshi Shibata |

| 31 August 1994 2nd-6 | Júbilo Iwata | 0–2 | Yokohama Flügels | Júbilo Iwata Stadium |
| 19:01 JST (UTC+09) | | J. League | Yoshioka 36'; Edu 67' | Attendance: 14,736; Referee: Shizuo Takada; Assistant referees: Kazuya Yanagisawa, Yasushi Tsuchimoto; Fourth official: Toshiaki Futamata |

| 3 September 1994 2nd-7 | Shimizu S-Pulse | 0–1 (V-goal) (a.e.t.) | Júbilo Iwata | Kobe Universiade Memorial Stadium |
| 19:02 JST (UTC+09) | | J. League | Fujita 108' | Attendance: 37,306; Referee: Yoshitsugu Katayama; Assistant referees: Sōichirō Kaneko, Satoru Kawano; Fourth official: Toyohide Kanda; Man of the Match: Toshiya Fujita |

| 7 September 1994 2nd-8 | Júbilo Iwata | 2–1 | Urawa Red Diamonds | Júbilo Iwata Stadium |
| 19:01 JST (UTC+09) | Fujita 63'; Vanenburg 84' | J. League | Rummenigge 25' | Attendance: 14,163; Referee: Masayoshi Okada; Assistant referees: Yoshimi Ogawa, Kazuhisa Osada; Fourth official: Toshiaki Futamata; Man of the Match: Vanenburg |

| 10 September 1994 2nd-9 | JEF United Ichihara | 5–1 | Júbilo Iwata | Sapporo Atsubetsu Stadium |
| 12:32 JST (UTC+09) | Ordenewitz 29', 76'; Igarashi 42'; Maslovar 80'; Gotō 89' | J. League | Matsubara 74' | Attendance: 18,382; Referee: Zoran Petrović; Assistant referees: Noboru Ishiyama, Kenichi Koshiyama; Fourth official: Eiji Kaneda |

| 14 September 1994 2nd-10 | Júbilo Iwata | 3–1 | Bellmare Hiratsuka | Júbilo Iwata Stadium |
| 18:59 JST (UTC+09) | Paus 29'; Matsubara 46', 59' | J. League | Betinho 36' | Attendance: 14,256; Referee: Shinichirō Obata; Assistant referees: Yoshitsugu Katayama, Yasushi Tsuchimoto; Fourth official: Takuya Okada; Man of the Match: Toshihiro Hattori |

| 17 September 1994 2nd-11 | Júbilo Iwata | 0–0 (V-goal) (a.e.t.) (4–3 p) | Sanfrecce Hiroshima | Júbilo Iwata Stadium |
| 14:00 JST (UTC+09) | | J. League | | Attendance: 13,970; Referee: Kiichirō Tachi; Assistant referees: Kazuo Kakihana, Yasuhiro Hemmi; Fourth official: Tōru Nagata; Man of the Match: Toshinobu Katsuya |
| | Penalties |
| | (penalty scored) Vanenburg; (penalty scored) Hattori; (penalty scored) Fujita; (penalty missed) M. Yoshida; (penalty scored) Kudō | | (penalty scored) Tore; (penalty missed) Moriyama; (penalty scored) Katanosaka; (penalty scored) Noh; (penalty missed) Satō |

| 21 September 1994 2nd-12 | Nagoya Grampus Eight | 4–1 | Júbilo Iwata | Nagoya Mizuho Athletics Stadium |
| 19:03 JST (UTC+09) | Binić 3'; Ogura 6'; Stojković 44' (pen.), 89' (pen.) | J. League | Yonezawa 46' | Attendance: 19,137; Referee: Hiroyuki Umemoto; Assistant referees: Morihisa Yamaguchi, Tetsu Karakida; Fourth official: Kazuo Koyake |

| 19 October 1994 2nd-13 | Júbilo Iwata | 2–1 (V-goal) (a.e.t.) | Verdy Kawasaki | Júbilo Iwata Stadium |
| 19:04 JST (UTC+09) | Schillaci 36'; Yonezawa 100' | J. League | Bentinho 44' | Attendance: 15,078; Referee: Tatsumi Ōno; Assistant referees: Yasushi Tsuchimoto, Takashi Kunori; Fourth official: Tōru Nagata; Man of the Match: Toshihiro Hattori |

| 22 October 1994 2nd-14 | Gamba Osaka | 1–1 (V-goal) (a.e.t.) (5–4 p) | Júbilo Iwata | Kobe Universiade Memorial Stadium |
| 19:05 JST (UTC+09) | Yamaguchi 60' | J. League | Yonezawa 35' | Attendance: 34,849; Referee: Kenji Tanaka; Assistant referees: Hiroshi Tanabe, Yasuhiro Matsuzaki; Fourth official: Keiji Hayashi |
| | Penalties |
| | (penalty scored) Isogai; (penalty scored) Yamaguchi; (penalty scored) Flavio; (penalty scored) Aleinikov; (penalty scored) Kitamura | | (penalty scored) Vanenburg; (penalty scored) Ōishi; (penalty scored) M. Yoshida; (penalty missed) Schillaci; (penalty scored) Hattori |

| 26 October 1994 2nd-15 | Júbilo Iwata | 1–2 | Yokohama Marinos | Júbilo Iwata Stadium |
| 19:03 JST (UTC+09) | Fujita 88' | J. League | Díaz 76'; Bisconti 82' | Attendance: 14,564; Referee: Keiichi Sunakawa; Assistant referees: Yasuhiro Hemmi, Kazuo Kakihana; Fourth official: Toshiaki Futamata |

| 29 October 1994 2nd-16 | Yokohama Flügels | 1–3 | Júbilo Iwata | Nagasaki Stadium |
| 18:33 JST (UTC+09) | Maeda 88' | J. League | Fujita 37'; Schillaci 65'; Matsubara 86' | Attendance: 14,472; Referee: Shinichirō Obata; Assistant referees: Hideaki Harada, Yoshikazu Hiroshima; Fourth official: Shigehisa Yamaguchi; Man of the Match: Mitsunori Yoshida |

| 2 November 1994 2nd-17 | Júbilo Iwata | 2–1 | Shimizu S-Pulse | Júbilo Iwata Stadium |
| 19:03 JST (UTC+09) | Schillaci 46', 57' | J. League | Toninho 86' | Attendance: 15,377; Referee: Kiyoshi Ōta; Assistant referees: Masahiro Katagiri, Tetsu Karakida; Fourth official: Takuya Okada; Man of the Match: Schillaci |

| 5 November 1994 2nd-18 | Urawa Red Diamonds | 2–0 | Júbilo Iwata | Kobe Universiade Memorial Stadium |
| 15:03 JST (UTC+09) | Lulu 30'; Hirose 80' | J. League | | Attendance: 23,195; Referee: Yōtarō Moritsu; Assistant referees: Morihisa Yamaguchi, Kazuo Kakihana; Fourth official: Tsuneo Murakami |

| 9 November 1994 2nd-19 | Júbilo Iwata | 1–0 | JEF United Ichihara | Júbilo Iwata Stadium |
| 19:03 JST (UTC+09) | Vanenburg 44' (pen.) | J. League | | Attendance: 15,357; Referee: Hideo Kikuchi; Assistant referees: Yasuhiro Hemmi, Hiroshi Tanabe; Fourth official: Toshiaki Futamata; Man of the Match: Vanenburg |

| 12 November 1994 2nd-20 | Bellmare Hiratsuka | 1–0 | Júbilo Iwata | Hiratsuka Stadium |
| 15:02 JST (UTC+09) | Narahashi 36' | J. League | | Attendance: 15,604; Referee: Alberto Tejada; Assistant referees: Hiroshi Fukuda, Takashi Kunori; Fourth official: Takeshi Ōgiya |

| 16 November 1994 2nd-21 | Sanfrecce Hiroshima | 0–0 (V-goal) (a.e.t.) (7–6 p) | Júbilo Iwata | Hiroshima Stadium |
| 19:04 JST (UTC+09) | | J. League | | Attendance: 8,523; Referee: Zoran Petrović; Assistant referees: Yasuhiro Matsuzaki, Naoki Esumi; Fourth official: Shinji Saga |
| | Penalties |
| | (penalty scored) Kazama; (penalty scored) Moriyama; (penalty missed) Moriyasu; (penalty scored) Yanagimoto; (penalty scored) Černý; (penalty scored) Takagi; (penalty scored) Noh; (penalty scored) Kojima | | (penalty scored) Vanenburg; (penalty scored) Hattori; (penalty scored) Fujita; (penalty missed) Yonezawa; (penalty scored) Matsubara; (penalty scored) Tanaka; (penalty scored) Koga; (penalty missed) Katsuya |

| 19 November 1994 2nd-22 | Júbilo Iwata | 3–2 | Kashima Antlers | Júbilo Iwata Stadium |
| 15:00 JST (UTC+09) | Koga 4'; Katsuya 73'; M. Suzuki 82' | J. League | Alcindo 62'; Hasegawa 67' | Attendance: 15,346; Referee: Alberto Tejada; Assistant referees: Mikio Fukuoka, Naoki Esumi; Fourth official: Tōru Nagata; Man of the Match: Toshihiro Hattori |

=== Emperor's Cup ===
| 4 December 1994 1st Round | Otsuka Pharmaceutical | 3–1 | Júbilo Iwata | Kochi Haruno Athletic Stadium |
| 13:00 JST (UTC+09) | Lê 4'; Sekiguchi 27'; Mario 39' (pen.) | | Date 38' | Attendance: 4,641 |

=== J.League Cup ===
| 27 July 1994 1st Round | Júbilo Iwata | 2–1 | Bellmare Hiratsuka | Júbilo Iwata Stadium |
| 19:00 JST (UTC+09) | Schillaci 9', 35' | J. League | T. Iwamoto 86' (pen.) | Attendance: 14,375; Referee: Tetsuya Hamana; Assistant referees: Yasushi Tsuchimoto, Takashi Kunori; Fourth official: Takuya Okada |

| 30 July 1994 Quarterfinals | Yokohama Flügels | 0–2 | Júbilo Iwata | Kagoshima Kamoike Stadium |
| 18:59 JST (UTC+09) | | J. League | Schillaci 50', 63' | Attendance: 12,956; Referee: Kiyoshi Ōta; Assistant referees: Hideaki Harada, Hiroshi Tanabe; Fourth official: Shōji Hamada |

| 3 August 1994 Semifinals | Yokohama Marinos | 0–1 | Júbilo Iwata | Hakatanomori Athletic Stadium |
| 19:01 JST (UTC+09) | | J. League | Schillaci 42' | Attendance: 11,672; Referee: Kenji Tanaka; Assistant referees: Kazuaki Hamaguchi, Tōru Yamashiro; Fourth official: Hideaki Harada |

| 6 August 1994 Final | Verdy Kawasaki | 2–0 | Júbilo Iwata | Kobe Universiade Memorial Stadium |
| 19:04 JST (UTC+09) | Bentinho 34'; Bismarck 42' | J. League | | Attendance: 37,475; Referee: Yoshimi Ogawa; Assistant referees: Hiroshi Fukuda, Kazuya Yanagisawa; Fourth official: Yoshitsugu Katayama |

== Player statistics ==
| No. | Pos | Nat | Player | Total | | J-League | | Emperor's Cup | | J-League Cup | |
| No. | Pos | Nat | Player | Apps | Goals | Apps | Goals | Apps | Goals | Apps | Goals |
|---|---|---|---|---|---|---|---|---|---|---|---|
| | GK | (Japan) JPN | Shinichi Morishita | 37 | 0 | 32 | 0 | 1 | 0 | 4 | 0 |
| | GK | (Japan) JPN | Yūshi Ozaki | 11 | 0 | 11 | 0 | 0 | 0 | 0 | 0 |
| | GK | (Japan) JPN | Tomoaki Ōgami | 4 | 0 | 4 | 0 | 0 | 0 | 0 | 0 |
| | GK | (Japan) JPN | Yukiya Hamano | 0 | 0 | 0 | 0 | 0 | 0 | 0 | 0 |
| | GK | (Japan) JPN | Naoki Kikuchi | 0 | 0 | 0 | 0 | 0 | 0 | 0 | 0 |
| | DF | (Japan) JPN | Toshinobu Katsuya | 23 | 1 | 22 | 1 | 1 | 0 | 0 | 0 |
| | DF | (Japan) JPN | Mamoru Kishimoto | 0 | 0 | 0 | 0 | 0 | 0 | 0 | 0 |
| | DF | (Japan) JPN | Masanori Higashikawa | 19 | 0 | 15 | 0 | 0 | 0 | 4 | 0 |
| | DF | (Japan) JPN | Michihisa Date | 26 | 1 | 25 | 0 | 1 | 1 | 0 | 0 |
| | DF | (Japan) JPN | Tetsu Nagasawa | 9 | 0 | 7 | 0 | 0 | 0 | 2 | 0 |
| | DF | (Japan) JPN | Takeshi Yonezawa | 17 | 4 | 16 | 4 | 1 | 0 | 0 | 0 |
| | DF | (Japan) JPN | Takuma Koga | 42 | 1 | 37 | 1 | 1 | 0 | 4 | 0 |
| | DF | (Japan) JPN | Yasuyuki Iwasaki | 0 | 0 | 0 | 0 | 0 | 0 | 0 | 0 |
| | DF | (Japan) JPN | Ryōsuke Kawaguchi | 0 | 0 | 0 | 0 | 0 | 0 | 0 | 0 |
| | DF | (Japan) JPN | Toshihiro Yoshimura | 0 | 0 | 0 | 0 | 0 | 0 | 0 | 0 |
| | DF | (Japan) JPN | Yoshiaki Sakazaki | 0 | 0 | 0 | 0 | 0 | 0 | 0 | 0 |
| | DF | (Japan) JPN | Hideto Suzuki | 0 | 0 | 0 | 0 | 0 | 0 | 0 | 0 |
| | DF | (Japan) JPN | Makoto Tanaka | 7 | 0 | 6 | 0 | 1 | 0 | 0 | 0 |
| | MF | (Japan) JPN | Mitsunori Yoshida | 35 | 0 | 34 | 0 | 0 | 0 | 1 | 0 |
| | MF | (Netherlands) NED | Vanenburg | 48 | 8 | 43 | 8 | 1 | 0 | 4 | 0 |
| | MF | (Japan) JPN | Kenji Komata | 30 | 0 | 26 | 0 | 0 | 0 | 4 | 0 |
| | MF | (Brazil) BRA | Walter | 0 | 0 | 0 | 0 | 0 | 0 | 0 | 0 |
| | MF | (Japan) JPN | Hiroyuki Yoshida | 16 | 0 | 16 | 0 | 0 | 0 | 0 | 0 |
| | MF | (Japan) JPN | Toshiya Fujita | 43 | 7 | 38 | 7 | 1 | 0 | 4 | 0 |
| | MF | (Japan) JPN | Yasuyoshi Hanba | 0 | 0 | 0 | 0 | 0 | 0 | 0 | 0 |
| | MF | (Japan) JPN | Tomoya Endō | 0 | 0 | 0 | 0 | 0 | 0 | 0 | 0 |
| | MF | (Japan) JPN | Kōji Kawada | 0 | 0 | 0 | 0 | 0 | 0 | 0 | 0 |
| | MF | (Japan) JPN | Atsushi Gotō | 0 | 0 | 0 | 0 | 0 | 0 | 0 | 0 |
| | MF | (Japan) JPN | Daisuke Oku | 0 | 0 | 0 | 0 | 0 | 0 | 0 | 0 |
| | FW | (Japan) JPN | Takao Ōishi | 31 | 1 | 30 | 1 | 1 | 0 | 0 | 0 |
| | FW | (Japan) JPN | Masashi Nakayama | 12 | 3 | 12 | 3 | 0 | 0 | 0 | 0 |
| | FW | (Japan) JPN | Masanori Suzuki | 34 | 7 | 29 | 7 | 1 | 0 | 4 | 0 |
| | FW | (Japan) JPN | Hidenori Tabata | 0 | 0 | 0 | 0 | 0 | 0 | 0 | 0 |
| | FW | (Japan) JPN | Masahiro Endō | 35 | 2 | 31 | 2 | 0 | 0 | 4 | 0 |
| | FW | (Japan) JPN | Naohiro Ōyama | 1 | 0 | 1 | 0 | 0 | 0 | 0 | 0 |
| | FW | (Japan) JPN | Kiyokazu Kudō | 10 | 0 | 9 | 0 | 1 | 0 | 0 | 0 |
| | FW | (Japan) JPN | Tadashi Komine | 0 | 0 | 0 | 0 | 0 | 0 | 0 | 0 |
| | FW | (Japan) JPN | Yoshika Matsubara | 18 | 7 | 18 | 7 | 0 | 0 | 0 | 0 |
| | DF | (Netherlands) NED | André Paus † | 39 | 5 | 35 | 5 | 0 | 0 | 4 | 0 |
| | DF | (Japan) JPN | Toshihiro Hattori † | 30 | 0 | 25 | 0 | 1 | 0 | 4 | 0 |
| | FW | (Italy) ITA | Schillaci † | 23 | 14 | 18 | 9 | 1 | 0 | 4 | 5 |

- † player(s) joined the team after the opening of this season.

== Transfers ==
In:

| No. | Pos. | Nation | Player |
|---|---|---|---|
| — | DF | JPN | Toshinobu Katsuya (from Yokohama Marinos) |
| — | DF | JPN | Ryōsuke Kawaguchi (from Osaka University of Commerce) |
| — | DF | JPN | Makoto Tanaka (from Shimizu Commercial High School) |
| — | MF | JPN | Toshiya Fujita (from University of Tsukuba) |
| — | MF | JPN | Daisuke Oku (from Kobe Koryo Gakuen High School) |
| — | FW | JPN | Masanori Suzuki (from Toshiba) |
| — | FW | JPN | Yoshika Matsubara (from Peñarol) |

Out: no data

== Transfers during the season ==
=== In ===
- (Netherlands) Andre Pausu (from FC Twente on February)
- (Japan) Toshihiro Hattori (from Tokai University)
- (Italy) Salvatore Schillaci (from Inter Milano on April)

== Awards ==
none

== Other pages ==
- (in Japanese) J. League official site
- (in Japanese) Júbilo Iwata official site
