= Masanori Suzuki =

Japanese footballer

Masanori Suzuki 鈴木 将方
Personal information
- Full name: Masanori Suzuki
- Date of birth: September 15, 1968 (age 58)
- Place of birth: Tokyo, Japan
- Height: 1.61 m (5 ft 3 1/2 in)
- Positions: Midfielder; forward

Youth career
- 1984–1986: Horikoshi High School
- 1987–1990: Kokushikan University

Senior career*
Years	Team	Apps	(Gls)
1991–1993	Toshiba		
1994–1997	Júbilo Iwata	74	(12)
Medal record
Júbilo Iwata
Winner	J1 League	1997
Runner-up	J.League Cup	1994
Runner-up	J.League Cup	1997
- * Club domestic league appearances and goals

Masanori Suzuki (鈴木 将方, Suzuki Masanori; born September 15, 1968) is a former Japanese football player.

== Playing career ==
Suzuki was born in Tokyo on September 15, 1968. After graduating from Kokushikan University, he joined Toshiba in 1991. He played as offensive midfielder and forward. In 1994, he moved to newly was promoted to J1 League club, Júbilo Iwata. From 1994, he played many matches instead Masashi Nakayama and Salvatore Schillaci left the games for injury. However he could hardly play in the match from 1996 and retired end of 1997 season.

== Club statistics ==
Club performance			League		Cup		League Cup		Total	
Season	Club	League	Apps	Goals	Apps	Goals	Apps	Goals	Apps	Goals
Japan			League		Emperor's Cup		J.League Cup		Total	
1990/91	Toshiba	JSL Division 1	3	0	0	0	0	0	3	0
1991/92	Toshiba	JSL Division 1	12	2			2	1	14	3
1992	Toshiba	Football League								
1993	Toshiba	Football League	0	0	2	0	-		2	0
1994	Júbilo Iwata	J1 League	29	7	1	0	4	0	34	7
1995	Júbilo Iwata	J1 League	38	3	2	2	-		40	5
1996	Júbilo Iwata	J1 League	0	0	0	0	0	0	0	0
1997	Júbilo Iwata	J1 League	7	0	1	0	2	0	10	0
Total			89	12	6	2	8	1	103	15
