= Toshinobu Katsuya =

Japanese footballer

Toshinobu Katsuya 勝矢 寿延
Personal information
- Full name: Toshinobu Katsuya
- Date of birth: September 2, 1961 (age 65)
- Place of birth: Nagasaki, Japan
- Height: 1.75 m (5 ft 9 in)
- Position: Defender

Youth career
- 1977–1979: Shimabara Shogyo High School

College career
Years	Team	Apps	(Gls)
1980–1983	Osaka University of Commerce		

Senior career*
Years	Team	Apps	(Gls)
1984–1991	Honda	140	(6)
1991–1993	Yokohama Marinos	45	(0)
1994–1997	Júbilo Iwata	99	(2)
1998	Cerezo Osaka	14	(0)
Total		298	(8)

International career
1985–1993	Japan	27	(0)
1989	Japan Futsal		
Medal record
Yokohama Marinos
Runner-up	Japan Soccer League	1991/92
Winner	Emperor's Cup	1991
Winner	Emperor's Cup	1992
Júbilo Iwata
Winner	J1 League	1997
Runner-up	J.League Cup	1994
Runner-up	J.League Cup	1997
Representing Japan
AFC Asian Cup
Gold medal – first place	1992 Japan
- * Club domestic league appearances and goals

Toshinobu Katsuya (勝矢 寿延, Katsuya Toshinobu; born September 2, 1961) is a former Japanese football player. He played for Japan national team.

== Club career ==
Katsuya was educated at and played for Shimabara Commerce High School and Osaka University of Commerce. After graduating in 1984, he joined Japan Soccer League side Honda. He was selected Best Eleven in 1985–86 and 1986–87. But he moved to fellow JSL side Nissan Motors (later Yokohama Marinos) in 1991. He was transferred to Júbilo Iwata in 1994, then to Cerezo Osaka in 1998, and retired from the game at the end of the 1998 season.

== National team career ==
In September 1985, Katsuya was selected Japan national team for 1986 World Cup qualification. At this qualification, on September 22, he debuted against Hong Kong. He also played 1986 Asian Games and 1988 Summer Olympics qualification in 1987.

In 1992, Katsuya was selected Japan for the first time in 5 years. He was a member of the Japan won the 1992 Asian Cup. He played 3 matches in the competition. In 1993, he was also selected Japan for 1994 World Cup qualification. At this qualification, he filled in for injured left back Satoshi Tsunami in the Final round. He was on the pitch when Japan's hope to play in the finals was dashed by an injury-time Iraqi equaliser in the last qualifier, the match that the Japanese fans now refer to as the Agony of Doha. This qualification was his last game for Japan. He played 27 games for Japan until 1993.

== Futsal career ==
In 1989, Katsuya selected Japan national futsal team for 1989 Futsal World Championship in Netherlands.

== Coaching career ==
After retirement, Katsuya started coaching career at Cerezo Osaka in 1999. He mainly served as coach and scout.

== Club statistics ==
Club performance			League		Cup		League Cup		Total	
Season	Club	League	Apps	Goals	Apps	Goals	Apps	Goals	Apps	Goals
Japan			League		Emperor's Cup		J.League Cup		Total	
1984	Honda	JSL Division 1	16	1					16	1
1985/86	Honda	JSL Division 1	22	0					22	0
1986/87	Honda	JSL Division 1	19	1					19	1
1987/88	Honda	JSL Division 1	22	1					22	1
1988/89	Honda	JSL Division 1	18	0					18	0
1989/90	Honda	JSL Division 1	22	2			2	1	24	3
1990/91	Honda	JSL Division 1	21	1			4	0	25	1
1991/92	Nissan Motors	JSL Division 1	20	0			3	0	23	0
1992	Yokohama Marinos	J1 League	-		0	0	6	0	6	0
1993	Yokohama Marinos	J1 League	25	0	1	0	0	0	26	0
1994	Júbilo Iwata	J1 League	22	1	1	0	0	0	23	1
1995	Júbilo Iwata	J1 League	35	1	0	0	-		35	1
1996	Júbilo Iwata	J1 League	27	0	1	0	13	1	41	0
1997	Júbilo Iwata	J1 League	15	0	2	0	4	0	21	0
1998	Cerezo Osaka	J1 League	14	0	0	0	0	0	14	0
Total			298	8	5	0	32	2	335	10

== National team statistics ==
Japan national team
Year	Apps	Goals
1985	2	0
1986	4	0
1987	6	0
1988	0	0
1989	0	0
1990	0	0
1991	0	0
1992	9	0
1993	6	0
Total	27	0

== Honors and awards ==
=== Team Honors ===
- 1992 Asian Cup (Champions)
