= Yoshika Matsubara =

Japanese footballer (born 1974)

Yoshika Matsubara 松原 良香
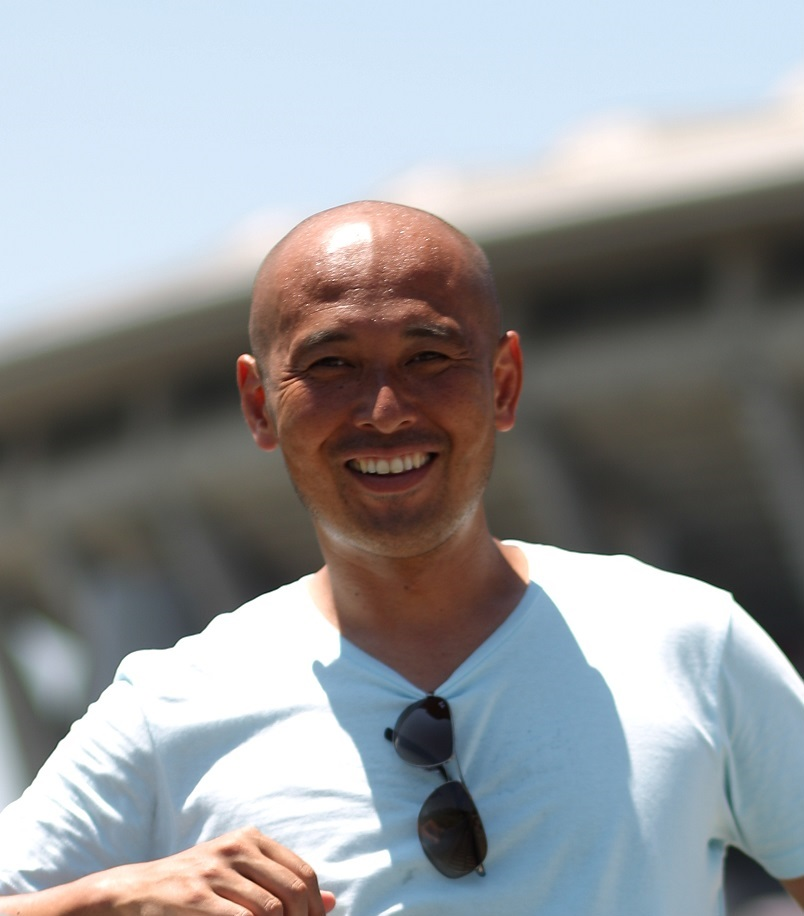

Personal information
- Date of birth: 19 August 1974 (age 52)
- Place of birth: Hamamatsu, Shizuoka, Japan
- Height: 1.79 m (5 ft 10 in)
- Position: Forward

Team information
- Current team: Iwate Grulla Morioka (manager)

Youth career
- 1990–1992: Tokai University Daiichi High School

Senior career*
Years	Team	Apps	(Gls)
1993	Peñarol		
1994–1998	Júbilo Iwata	33	(10)
1996	→ Shimizu S-Pulse (loan)	13	(3)
1997	→ JEF United Ichihara (loan)	25	(8)
1999	Rijeka	2	(0)
1999	Delémont	6	(0)
2000	Shonan Bellmare	35	(12)
2001	Progreso		
2001	Avispa Fukuoka	8	(0)
2002	Defensor Sporting		
2003–2004	Okinawa Kariyushi FC		
2004–2005	Shizuoka FC		

International career
1996	Japan U-23	2	(0)

Managerial career
- 2005: Shizuoka FC
- 2015: SC Sagamihara
- 2023: Iwate Grulla Morioka
Medal record
Júbilo Iwata
Runner-up	J1 League	1998
Winner	J.League Cup	1998
Runner-up	J.League Cup	1994
Shimizu S-Pulse333
Winner	J.League Cup	1996
- * Club domestic league appearances and goals

Yoshika Matsubara (松原 良香, Matsubara Yoshika; born 19 August 1974) is a Japanese football manager and former player who is the current manager of J3 League club Iwate Grulla Morioka.

== Playing career ==
Born in Hamamatsu, Shizuoka Prefecture, Matsubara spent time playing with Peñarol of Uruguay upon graduating from Tokai University Daiichi High School. He joined J1 League team Júbilo Iwata in 1994 upon his return to Japan, then making a series of moves starting with Shimizu S-Pulse, JEF United Ichihara, Rijeka of Croatia, Delémont of Switzerland, Shonan Bellmare, Progreso of Uruguay, Avispa Fukuoka, Defensor Sporting of Uruguay, Okinawa Kariyushi FC and Shizuoka FC.

Matsubara also represented the Japan U23 national team, and was part of the 1996 Summer Olympics team which defeated the Brazil which included players such as Rivaldo, Roberto Carlos and Bebeto.

== Career statistics ==
Appearances and goals by club, season and competition
Club	Season	League			National cup (Note: Includes Emperor's Cup, Croatian Cup)		League cup (Note: Includes J.League Cup)		Total	
Club	Season	Division	Apps	Goals	Apps	Goals	Apps	Goals	Apps	Goals
Júbilo Iwata	1994	J1 League	18	7	0	0	0	0	18	7
Júbilo Iwata	1995	J1 League	15	3	2	0	–		17	3
Júbilo Iwata	1998	J1 League	0	0	0	0	0	0	0	0
Júbilo Iwata	Total		33	10	2	0	0	0	35	10
Shimizu S-Pulse (loan)	1996	J1 League	13	3	0	0	3	0	16	3
JEF United Ichihara (loan)	1997	J1 League	25	8	2	0	7	3	34	11
HNK Rijeka	1998–99	Prva HNL	2	0	0	0	–		2	0
Delémont	1999–2000	Nationalliga A	6	0			–		6	0
Shonan Bellmare	2000	J2 League	35	12	3	0	2	1	40	13
Avispa Fukuoka	2001	J1 League	8	0	0	0	4	0	12	0
Okinawa Kariyushi FC	2003	Regional Leagues	20	11	2	1	–		22	12
Okinawa Kariyushi FC	2004	Regional Leagues								
Okinawa Kariyushi FC	Total									
Shizuoka FC	2004	Regional Leagues								
Shizuoka FC	2005	Regional Leagues								
Shizuoka FC	Total									
Career total			142	44	9	1	16	4	167	49

== Managerial statistics ==
Team	From	To	Record				
Team	From	To	G	W	D	L	Win %
SC Sagamihara	2015		3	2	1	0	66.67
Iwate Grulla Morioka	2023	present	0	0	0	0	—
Total			3	2	1	0	66.67
