= Takeshi Yonezawa =

Japanese footballer

Takeshi Yonezawa 米澤 剛志
Personal information
- Full name: Takeshi Yonezawa
- Date of birth: February 6, 1969 (age 57)
- Place of birth: Osaka, Japan
- Height: 1.86 m (6 ft 1 in)
- Position: Defender

Youth career
- 1984–1986: Hokuyo High School
- 1987–1990: Osaka University of Health and Sport Sciences

Senior career*
Years	Team	Apps	(Gls)
1991–1995	Júbilo Iwata		
1996	Gamba Osaka	0	(0)
1997	Oita Trinity		
Medal record
Júbilo Iwata
Runner-up	J.League Cup	1994
- * Club domestic league appearances and goals

Takeshi Yonezawa (米澤 剛志, Yonezawa Takeshi; born February 6, 1969) is a former Japanese football player.

== Playing career ==
Yonezawa was born in Osaka Prefecture on February 6, 1969. After graduating from Osaka University of Health and Sport Sciences, he joined Japan Football League (JFL) club Yamaha Motors (later Júbilo Iwata) in 1991. He played as center back for the club until 1995. In 1996, he moved to his local club Gamba Osaka. However he could not play at all in the match. In 1997, he moved to JFL club Oita Trinity. He retired end of 1997 season.

== Club statistics ==
Club performance			League		Cup		League Cup		Total	
Season	Club	League	Apps	Goals	Apps	Goals	Apps	Goals	Apps	Goals
Japan			League		Emperor's Cup		J.League Cup		Total	
1990/91	Yamaha Motors	JSL Division 1	0	0	0	0	0	0	0	0
1991/92	Yamaha Motors	JSL Division 1	7	1			1	0	8	1
1992	Yamaha Motors	Football League								
1993	Yamaha Motors	Football League	12	2			0	0	12	2
1994	Júbilo Iwata	J1 League	16	4	1	0	0	0	17	4
1995	Júbilo Iwata	J1 League	19	1	0	0	-		19	1
1996	Gamba Osaka	J1 League	0	0			0	0	0	0
Total			54	8	1	0	1	0	55	8
