= Takuma Koga =

Takuma Koga may refer to:

- Takuma Koga (footballer), Japanese footballer
- Takuma Koga (racing driver), Japanese racing driver
