= Mitsunori Yoshida =

Japanese footballer

Mitsunori Yoshida 吉田 光範
Personal information
- Full name: Mitsunori Yoshida
- Date of birth: March 8, 1962 (age 64)
- Place of birth: Kariya, Aichi, Japan
- Height: 1.75 m (5 ft 9 in)
- Position: Midfielder

Youth career
- 1977–1979: Kariya Kogyo High School

Senior career*
Years	Team	Apps	(Gls)
1980–1995	Júbilo Iwata	275	(35)
Total		275	(35)

International career
1988–1993	Japan	35	(2)
Medal record
Júbilo Iwata
Winner	Japan Soccer League	1987/88
Runner-up	JSL Cup	1989
Runner-up	J.League Cup	1994
Winner	Emperor's Cup	1982
Runner-up	Emperor's Cup	1989
Representing Japan
AFC Asian Cup
Gold medal – first place	1992 Japan
- * Club domestic league appearances and goals

Mitsunori Yoshida (吉田 光範, Yoshida Mitsunori; born March 8, 1962) is a former Japanese football player. He played for Japan national team.

== Club career ==
Yoshida was born in Kariya on March 8, 1962. After graduating from Kariya Industrial High School, he joined Japan Soccer League side Yamaha Motors (later Júbilo Iwata) in 1980. The club won 1982 Emperor's Cup and 1987–88 Japan Soccer League. He never moved to any other club and retired as an Iwata player after the 1995 season. He played total 275 league matches and scored 35 goals for club.

== National team career ==
Yoshida was capped 35 times and scored 2 goals for the Japan national team between 1988 and 1993. He made his international debut in a friendly against China on June 2, 1988, at Nagoya Mizuho Athletics Stadium. He scored his first international goal against China on May 13, 1989, at Okayama Stadium. He was a member of the Japan team that won the 1992 Asian Cup. He played twice in the tournament.

== Coaching career ==
After retirement, Yoshida started coaching career at Júbilo Iwata in 2001. He mainly served as coach for top team and manager for youth team until 2009.

== Club statistics ==
Appearances and goals by club, season and competition
Club	Season	League			Emperor's Cup		J.League Cup		Total	
Club	Season	Division	Apps	Goals	Apps	Goals	Apps	Goals	Apps	Goals
Yamaha Motors	1980	JSL Division 1	1	0					1	0
Yamaha Motors	1981	JSL Division 1	9	1					9	1
Yamaha Motors	1982	JSL Division 2	14	7					14	7
Yamaha Motors	1983	JSL Division 1	16	2					16	2
Yamaha Motors	1984	JSL Division 1	18	7					18	7
Yamaha Motors	1985–86	JSL Division 1	21	3					21	3
Yamaha Motors	1986–87	JSL Division 1	12	1					12	1
Yamaha Motors	1987–88	JSL Division 1	22	3					22	3
Yamaha Motors	1988–89	JSL Division 1	21	3					21	3
Yamaha Motors	1989–90	JSL Division 1	22	4			5	1	27	5
Yamaha Motors	1990–91	JSL Division 1	12	0			0	0	12	0
Yamaha Motors	1991–92	JSL Division 1	21	3			1	0	22	3
Yamaha Motors	1992	Football League	12	1			—		12	1
Yamaha Motors	1993	Football League	16	0	1	0	—		17	0
Júbilo Iwata	1994	J1 League	34	0	0	0	1	0	35	0
Júbilo Iwata	1995	J1 League	24	0	0	0	—		24	0
Career total			275	35	1	0	7	1	283	36

== National team statistics ==
Japan national team
Year	Apps	Goals
1988	1	0
1989	10	1
1990	0	0
1991	0	0
1992	8	0
1993	16	1
Total	35	2

== Honors and awards ==
=== Team Honors ===
- 1992 Asian Cup (Champions)
