= André Paus =

Dutch footballer and manager

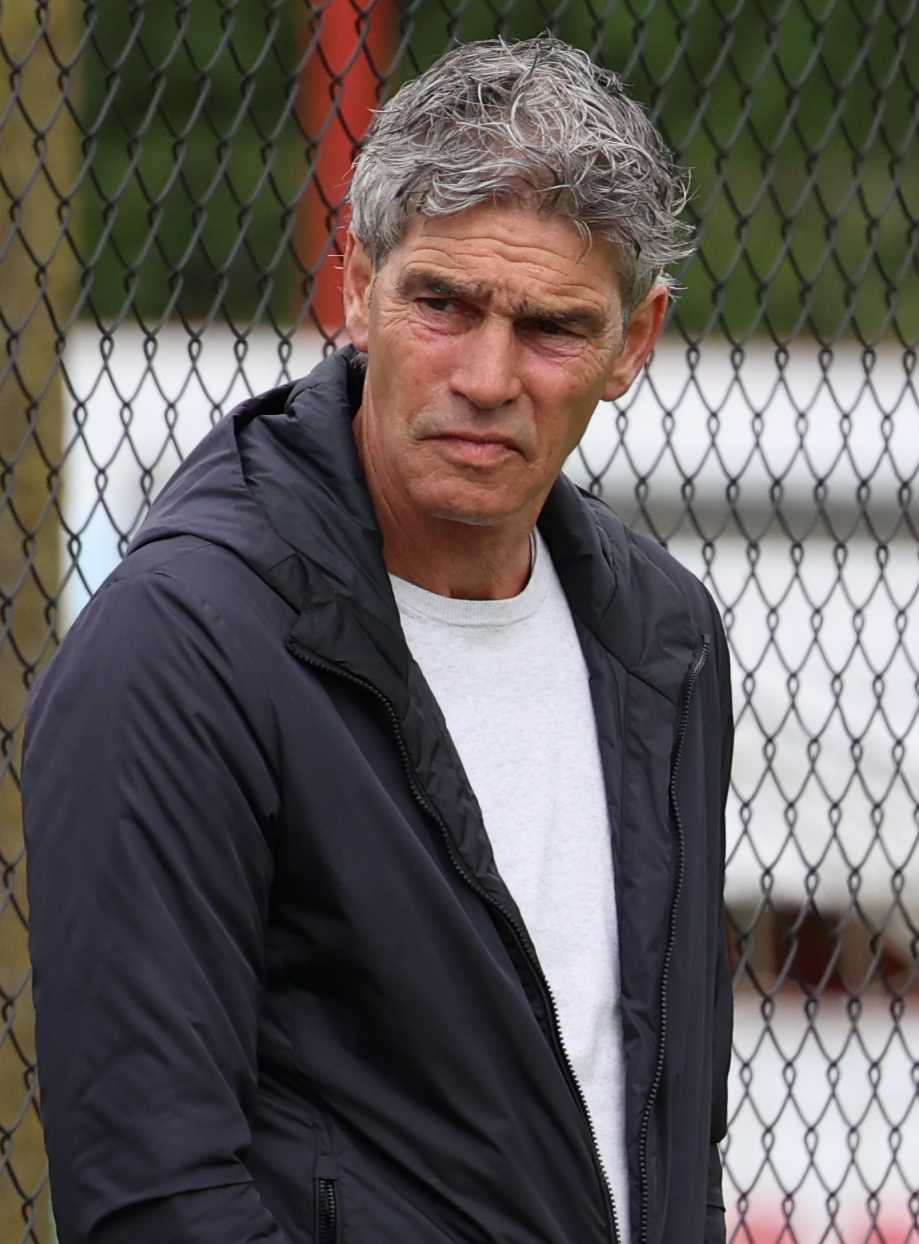

Personal information
- Full name: Andréas Gerardus Maria Paus
- Date of birth: 9 October 1965 (age 61)
- Place of birth: Weerselo, Netherlands
- Height: 1.93 m (6 ft 4 in)
- Position: Defender

Youth career
- –1981: VV UD Weerselo
- 1981–1985: FC Twente

Senior career*
Years	Team	Apps	(Gls)
1985–1994	FC Twente	118	(4)
1994–1995	Júbilo Iwata	64	(7)
1996	Fujitsu	22	(2)
1997–1998	Heracles Almelo	5	(0)
Total		209	(13)

Managerial career
- 2006–2011: WKE
- 2011–2012: SV Spakenburg
- 2012–2013: FC Lienden
- 2013–2014: Jong Vitesse
- 2013–2014: Vitesse (coach)
- 2014: Valletta
- 2014–2016: Anorthosis Famagusta
- 2016–2017: FC Twente (scout)
- 2017: AEL
- 2017–2018: Enosis Neon Paralimni
- 2019: Quick '20 (caretaker)
- 2019–2022: Birkirkara
- * Club domestic league appearances and goals

André Paus (born 9 October 1965 in Weerselo) is a Dutch former professional footballer and manager

== Career statistics ==
=== Club ===
Club performance			League		Cup		Other		Total	
Season	Club	League	Apps	Goals	Apps	Goals	Apps	Goals	Apps	Goals
Netherlands			League		KNVB Beker		UEFA Cup		Total	
1985–86	FC Twente	Eredivisie	2	0	0	0	–		2	0
1986–87	FC Twente	Eredivisie	5	0	0	0	–		5	0
1987–88	FC Twente	Eredivisie	3	0	0	0	–		3	0
1988–89	FC Twente	Eredivisie	6	0	0	0	0	0	6	0
1989–90	FC Twente	Eredivisie	18	0	0	0	2	1	20	1
1990–91	FC Twente	Eredivisie	12	0	0	0	2	1	14	1
1991–92	FC Twente	Eredivisie	27	1	1	0	–		28	1
1992–93	FC Twente	Eredivisie	29	3	1	0	–		30	3
1993–94	FC Twente	Eredivisie	16	0	1	0	0	0	17	0
Japan			League		Emperor's Cup		J.League Cup		Total	
1994	Júbilo Iwata	J1 League	35	5	0	0	4	0	39	5
1995	Júbilo Iwata	J1 League	29	2	0	0	–		29	2
1996	Fujitsu	Football League	22	2	0	0	–		22	2
Netherlands			League		KNVB Beker		UEFA Cup		Total	
1996–97	Heracles Almelo	Eerste Divisie	3	0	0	0	–		3	0
1997–98	Heracles Almelo	Eerste Divisie	2	0	0	0	–		2	0
Country	Netherlands		123	4	3	0	4	2	130	6
Country	Japan		86	9	0	0	4	0	90	9
Career Total			209	13	3	0	8	2	220	15

=== Managerial ===
As of 7 May 2022

Team		From	To	Record					Ref.
Team		From	To	G	W	D	L	Win %	Ref.
WKE	(Netherlands)	1 July 2006	30 June 2009	79	50	15	14	63.29	
SV Spakenburg	(Netherlands)	1 July 2009	30 June 2012	93	55	19	19	59.14	
FC Lienden	(Netherlands)	1 July 2012	30 June 2013	31	15	4	13	48.39	
Jong Vitesse	(Netherlands)	1 July 2013	24 January 2014	10	6	3	1	60.00	
Valletta	(Malta)	25 January 2014	31 May 2014	16	13	3	0	81.25	
Anorthosis Famagusta	(Cyprus)	1 June 2014	18 February 2016	55	30	10	15	54.55	
AEL	(Greece)	3 April 2017	20 September 2017	7	1	2	4	14.29	
Enosis Neon Paralimni	(Cyprus)	1 November 2017	14 November 2018	32	19	5	8	59.38	
Quick '20 (caretaker)	(Netherlands)	1 April 2019	30 June 2019	5	0	5	0	0.00	
Birkirkara	(Malta)	9 September 2019	20 April 2022	80	39	23	18	48.75	
Total				407	228	88	92	56.02	–

== Honours ==
=== Player ===
Júbilo Iwata

- J.League Cup: Runner Up: 1994

=== Manager ===
WKE

- Hoofdklasse: 2006–07, 2008–09

SV Spakenburg

- Topklasse Zaterdag: 2011–12

Valletta

- Maltese Premier League: 2013–14
- Maltese FA Trophy: 2013–14

Enosis Neon Paralimni

- Cypriot Second Division: 2017–18
