= Tokura =

Tokura (written: 都倉, 戸倉 or 十倉) is a Japanese surname. Notable people with the surname include:

- Ken Tokura (都倉 賢, born 1986), Japanese footballer
- Kenichiro Tokura (戸倉 健一郎, born 1971), Japanese footballer
- Saburo Tokura (戸倉 三郎, born 1954), Japanese jurist
- Shunichi Tokura (都倉 俊一, born 1948), Japanese composer
- Yoshinori Tokura (十倉 好紀, born 1954), Japanese physicist

== Fictional characters ==
- Aoi Tokura (都倉 碧), a character in the manga series Rainy Cocoa
- Eiko Tokura (十倉 栄依子), a character in the manga series Slow Start
- Misaki Tokura (戸倉 ミサキ), a character in the media franchise Cardfight!! Vanguard
