= 1997 Júbilo Iwata season =

Júbilo Iwata
1997 season
- Manager: Luiz Felipe Scolari; Takashi Kuwahara
- Stadium: Júbilo Iwata Stadium
- J.League: Champions
- Emperor's Cup: Semifinals
- J.League Cup: Runners-up
- Top goalscorer: Masashi Nakayama (18)
Home colours	Away colours

1997 Júbilo Iwata season

== Competitions ==
Competitions	Position
J.League	Champions / 17 clubs
Emperor's Cup	Semifinals
J.League Cup	Runners-up

== Domestic results ==
=== J.League ===
12 April 1997 1-1	Júbilo Iwata	2-1	Sanfrecce Hiroshima	Júbilo Iwata Stadium
JST (UTC+09)

16 April 1997 1-2	Avispa Fukuoka	0-1 (GG) (a.e.t.)	Júbilo Iwata	Hakatanomori Football Stadium
JST (UTC+09)

19 April 1997 1-3	Júbilo Iwata	1-2	Cerezo Osaka	Júbilo Iwata Stadium
JST (UTC+09)

23 April 1997 1-4	Vissel Kobe	1-2	Júbilo Iwata	Kobe Universiade Memorial Stadium
JST (UTC+09)

26 April 1997 1-5	Júbilo Iwata	1-2	Kashima Antlers	Júbilo Iwata Stadium
JST (UTC+09)

3 May 1997 1-6	Nagoya Grampus Eight	0-2	Júbilo Iwata	Gifu Nagaragawa Stadium
JST (UTC+09)

7 May 1997 1-7	Júbilo Iwata	3-1	Yokohama Flügels	Júbilo Iwata Stadium
JST (UTC+09)

1-8	bye

17 May 1997 1-9	Kashiwa Reysol	2-1	Júbilo Iwata	Hitachi Kashiwa Soccer Stadium
JST (UTC+09)

24 May 1997 1-10	Júbilo Iwata	2-0	Urawa Red Diamonds	Júbilo Iwata Stadium
JST (UTC+09)

28 May 1997 1-11	Gamba Osaka	3-1	Júbilo Iwata	Osaka Expo '70 Stadium
JST (UTC+09)

31 May 1997 1-12	Júbilo Iwata	0-1 (GG) (a.e.t.)	Verdy Kawasaki	Júbilo Iwata Stadium
JST (UTC+09)

5 July 1997 1-13	Kyoto Purple Sanga	0-6	Júbilo Iwata	Nishikyogoku Athletic Stadium
JST (UTC+09)

9 July 1997 1-14	Júbilo Iwata	4-1	JEF United Ichihara	Júbilo Iwata Stadium
JST (UTC+09)

12 July 1997 1-15	Bellmare Hiratsuka	2-1 (GG) (a.e.t.)	Júbilo Iwata	Hiratsuka Athletics Stadium
JST (UTC+09)

16 July 1997 1-16	Júbilo Iwata	3-4 (GG) (a.e.t.)	Yokohama Marinos	Júbilo Iwata Stadium
JST (UTC+09)

19 July 1997 1-17	Shimizu S-Pulse	1-2	Júbilo Iwata	Nihondaira Sports Stadium
JST (UTC+09)

30 July 1997 2-1	Yokohama Marinos	1-4	Júbilo Iwata	Yokohama Mitsuzawa Stadium
JST (UTC+09)

2 August 1997 2-2	Sanfrecce Hiroshima	1-3	Júbilo Iwata	Hiroshima Big Arch
JST (UTC+09)

6 August 1997 2-3	Júbilo Iwata	2-1	Avispa Fukuoka	Júbilo Iwata Stadium
JST (UTC+09)

9 August 1997 2-4	Cerezo Osaka	1-4	Júbilo Iwata	Osaka Nagai Stadium
JST (UTC+09)

16 August 1997 2-5	Júbilo Iwata	2-1	Vissel Kobe	Júbilo Iwata Stadium
JST (UTC+09)

20 August 1997 2-6	Kashima Antlers	2-0	Júbilo Iwata	Kashima Soccer Stadium
JST (UTC+09)

23 August 1997 2-7	Júbilo Iwata	1-3	Nagoya Grampus Eight	Júbilo Iwata Stadium
JST (UTC+09)

30 August 1997 2-8	Yokohama Flügels	0-2	Júbilo Iwata	Yokohama Mitsuzawa Stadium
JST (UTC+09)

2-9	bye

6 September 1997 2-10	Júbilo Iwata	2-1	Kashiwa Reysol	Júbilo Iwata Stadium
JST (UTC+09)

10 September 1997 2-11	Júbilo Iwata	3-1	Bellmare Hiratsuka	Júbilo Iwata Stadium
JST (UTC+09)

13 September 1997 2-12	Urawa Red Diamonds	0-1 (GG) (a.e.t.)	Júbilo Iwata	Urawa Komaba Stadium
JST (UTC+09)

20 September 1997 2-13	Verdy Kawasaki	1-6	Júbilo Iwata	Niigata City Athletic Stadium
JST (UTC+09)

24 September 1997 2-14	Júbilo Iwata	1-0 (GG) (a.e.t.)	Gamba Osaka	Júbilo Iwata Stadium
JST (UTC+09)

27 September 1997 2-15	Júbilo Iwata	2-1	Kyoto Purple Sanga	Júbilo Iwata Stadium
JST (UTC+09)

1 October 1997 2-16	JEF United Ichihara	0-5	Júbilo Iwata	Ichihara Seaside Stadium
JST (UTC+09)

4 October 1997 2-17	Júbilo Iwata	2-0	Shimizu S-Pulse	Júbilo Iwata Stadium
JST (UTC+09)

=== Emperor's Cup ===
1st Round	bye

2nd Round	bye

17 December 1997 3rd Round	Júbilo Iwata	3-0	Hannan University	Júbilo Iwata Stadium
JST (UTC+09)

20 December 1997 4th Round	Cerezo Osaka	2-3	Júbilo Iwata	Nagasaki Athletic Stadium
JST (UTC+09)

23 December 1997 Quarterfinals	Kashiwa Reysol	1-2	Júbilo Iwata	Osaka Nagai Stadium
JST (UTC+09)

28 December 1997 Semifinals	Júbilo Iwata	2-3	Yokohama Flügels	Kobe Universiade Memorial Stadium
JST (UTC+09)

=== J.League Cup ===
8 March 1997 GL-E-1	Yokohama Flügels	1-2	Júbilo Iwata	Yokohama Mitsuzawa Stadium
JST (UTC+09)

15 March 1997 GL-E-2	Júbilo Iwata	2-1	Kyoto Purple Sanga	Júbilo Iwata Stadium
JST (UTC+09)

19 March 1997 GL-E-3	Avispa Fukuoka	1-1	Júbilo Iwata	Hakatanomori Football Stadium
JST (UTC+09)

22 March 1997 GL-E-4	Kyoto Purple Sanga	1-3	Júbilo Iwata	Nishikyogoku Athletic Stadium
JST (UTC+09)

26 March 1997 GL-E-5	Júbilo Iwata	4-2	Avispa Fukuoka	Júbilo Iwata Stadium
JST (UTC+09)

29 March 1997 GL-E-6	Júbilo Iwata	0-0	Yokohama Flügels	Júbilo Iwata Stadium
JST (UTC+09)

15 October 1997 Quarterfinals-1	Urawa Red Diamonds	0-0	Júbilo Iwata	Urawa Komaba Stadium
JST (UTC+09)

18 October 1997 Quarterfinals-2	Júbilo Iwata	3-2 (3-2 agg.)	Urawa Red Diamonds	Júbilo Iwata Stadium
JST (UTC+09)

1 November 1997 Semifinals-1	Yokohama Flügels	1-0	Júbilo Iwata	Yokohama Mitsuzawa Stadium
JST (UTC+09)

9 November 1997 Semifinals-2	Júbilo Iwata	2-0 (GG) (a.e.t.) (2-1 agg.)	Yokohama Flügels	Júbilo Iwata Stadium
JST (UTC+09)

22 November 1997 Final-1	Júbilo Iwata	1-2	Kashima Antlers	Júbilo Iwata Stadium
JST (UTC+09)		J. League

29 November 1997 Final-2	Kashima Antlers	5-1 (7-2 agg.)	Júbilo Iwata	Kashima Soccer Stadium
JST (UTC+09)		J. League

== Player statistics ==
No.	Pos.	Nat.	Player	D.o.B. (Age)	Height / Weight	J.League		J.League Championship		Emperor's Cup		J.League Cup		Total	
No.	Pos.	Nat.	Player	D.o.B. (Age)	Height / Weight	Apps	Goals	Apps	Goals	Apps	Goals	Apps	Goals	Apps	Goals
1	GK	(Japan)	Yushi Ozaki	March 24, 1969 (aged 27)	186 cm / 88 kg	1	0	0	0	0	0	0	0	1	0
2	DF	(Japan)	Hideto Suzuki	October 7, 1974 (aged 22)	180 cm / 70 kg	24	0	1	0	4	0	6	0	35	0
3	DF	(Japan)	Masahiro Endo	August 15, 1970 (aged 26)	182 cm / 80 kg	5	0	0	0	0	0	0	0	5	0
4	DF	(Brazil)	Adílson	March 16, 1968 (aged 28)	183 cm / 78 kg	22	5	2	0	0	0	11	3	35	8
5	DF	(Japan)	Makoto Tanaka	August 8, 1975 (aged 21)	178 cm / 72 kg	23	0	2	0	4	0	9	0	38	0
6	MF	(Japan)	Toshihiro Hattori	September 23, 1973 (aged 23)	178 cm / 73 kg	18	2	2	0	4	0	4	0	28	2
7	MF	(Japan)	Hiroshi Nanami	November 28, 1972 (aged 24)	176 cm / 68 kg	21	5	2	0	2	1	2	0	27	6
8	MF	(Brazil)	Dunga	October 31, 1963 (aged 33)	177 cm / 77 kg	26	5	0	0	0	0	11	1	37	6
9	FW	(Japan)	Masashi Nakayama	September 23, 1967 (aged 29)	178 cm / 74 kg	27	18	2	3	4	2	11	6	44	29
10	MF	(Japan)	Toshiya Fujita	October 4, 1971 (aged 25)	173 cm / 65 kg	24	9	2	0	4	3	6	0	36	12
11	FW	(Italy)	Schillaci	December 1, 1964 (aged 32)	171 cm / 70 kg	3	1	0	0	0	0	2	1	5	2
12	GK	(Japan)	Tomoaki Ogami	June 7, 1970 (aged 26)	182 cm / 80 kg	32	0	2	0	4	0	12	0	50	0
13	FW	(Japan)	Naohiro Oyama	April 24, 1974 (aged 22)	171 cm / 63 kg	0	0	0	0		0	0	0		0
14	DF	(Japan)	Takahiro Yamanishi	April 2, 1976 (aged 20)	173 cm / 67 kg	26	1	2	0	4	0	12	0	44	1
15	MF	(Japan)	Akira Konno	September 12, 1974 (aged 22)	163 cm / 60 kg	0	0	0	0		0	1	0		0
16	GK	(Japan)	Norihiro Karatani	August 17, 1970 (aged 26)	184 cm / 82 kg	0	0	0	0		0	0	0		0
17	DF	(Japan)	Akira Matsumori	November 19, 1977 (aged 19)	183 cm / 72 kg	0	0	0	0		0	0	0		0
18	FW	(Japan)	Norihisa Shimizu	October 4, 1976 (aged 20)	170 cm / 68 kg	19	1	2	1	4	1	11	2	36	5
19	MF	(Japan)	Masanori Suzuki	September 15, 1968 (aged 28)	161 cm / 58 kg	7	0	0	0	1	0	2	0	10	0
20	MF	(Japan)	Kiyokazu Kudo	June 21, 1974 (aged 22)	173 cm / 74 kg	12	1	1	0	2	0	8	1	23	2
21	GK	(Japan)	Hiroki Kobayashi	May 24, 1977 (aged 19)	184 cm / 81 kg	0	0	0	0		0	0	0		0
22	DF	(Japan)	Kensuke Tsukuda	June 28, 1977 (aged 19)	181 cm / 71 kg	1	0	0	0	0	0	0	0	1	0
23	MF	(Japan)	Takashi Fukunishi	September 1, 1976 (aged 20)	181 cm / 73 kg	21	4	0	0	3	1	6	1	30	6
24	FW	(Japan)	Koji Sakamoto	December 3, 1978 (aged 18)	174 cm / 63 kg	0	0	0	0		0	2	0		0
25	MF	(Japan)	Yasushi Kita	April 25, 1978 (aged 18)	181 cm / 72 kg	1	0	1	0	0	0	5	0	7	0
26	DF	(Japan)	Toshinobu Katsuya	September 2, 1961 (aged 35)	175 cm / 76 kg	15	0	0	0	2	0	4	0	21	0
27	MF	(Japan)	Ryuji Ishino	June 3, 1978 (aged 18)	169 cm / 57 kg	0	0	0	0		0	0	0		0
28	MF	(Japan)	Takuma Koga	April 30, 1969 (aged 27)	175 cm / 72 kg	26	0	2	0	2	0	9	0	39	0
29	MF	(Japan)	Daisuke Oku	February 7, 1976 (aged 21)	173 cm / 71 kg	26	9	2	0	4	0	12	3	44	12
30	FW	(Japan)	Kazuki Kuranuki	November 10, 1978 (aged 18)	172 cm / 56 kg	0	0	0	0		0	0	0		0
31	FW	(Brazil)	Mabilia	October 31, 1972 (aged 24)	183 cm / 80 kg	10	3	0	0	0	0	4	1	14	4
32	FW	(Japan)	Shinya Hoshido	October 4, 1978 (aged 18)	183 cm / 67 kg	0	0	0	0		0	1	0		0
33	FW	(Japan)	Takanori Nunobe †	September 23, 1973 (aged 23)	177 cm / 71 kg	11	2	1	0	2	0	4	0	18	2
31	FW	(Brazil)	Alessandro †	May 27, 1973 (aged 23)	cm / kg	13	5	0	0	3	1	2	0	18	6

- † player(s) joined the team after the opening of this season.

== Transfers ==
In:

No.	Pos.	Nation	Player
16	GK	JPN	Norihiro Karatani (from JEF United Ichihara)
4	DF	BRA	Adílson Dias Batista (from Grêmio)
15	MF	JPN	Akira Konno (from Kokushikan University)
25	MF	JPN	Yasushi Kita (from Kinki University High School)
27	MF	JPN	Ryuji Ishino (from Júbilo Iwata youth)
24	FW	JPN	Koji Sakamoto (from Shizuoka Gakuen Senior High School)
30	FW	JPN	Kazuki Kuranuki (from Shizuoka Gakuen Senior High School)
31	FW	BRA	Marcelo Mabilia (from Tubarão)
32	FW	JPN	Shinya Hoshido (from Bunan Senior High School)

Out:

No.	Pos.	Nation	Player
—	GK	JPN	Dido (to Consadole Sapporo)
—	GK	JPN	Yukiya Hamano
—	DF	NED	Vanenburg
—	DF	JPN	Ippei Watanabe (to Vissel Kobe)
—	MF	JPN	Masao Yamamoto
—	FW	JPN	Nobuhiro Takeda (to Verdy Kawasaki)
—	FW	JPN	Satoshi Okura (to Brummel Sendai)
—	FW	JPN	Takayuki Iwakura

== Transfers during the season ==
=== In ===
- (Japan) Takanori Nunobe (from Verdy Kawasaki)
- (Brazil) Alessandro Andrade de Oliveira (from Santos FC on August)

=== Out ===
- (Brazil) Mabilia (on August)

== Awards ==
- J.League Most Valuable Player: (Brazil) Dunga
- J.League Best XI: (Japan) Tomoaki Ogami, (Brazil) Dunga, (Japan) Hiroshi Nanami, (Japan) Masashi Nakayama

== Other pages ==
- (in Japanese) J. League official site
- (in Japanese) Júbilo Iwata official site
