= Takao Oishi =

Japanese footballer

Takao Oishi 大石 隆夫
Personal information
- Full name: Takao Oishi
- Date of birth: May 25, 1964 (age 62)
- Place of birth: Shizuoka, Japan
- Height: 1.65 m (5 ft 5 in)
- Positions: Midfielder; forward

Youth career
- 1980–1982: Shimizu Higashi High School
- 1983–1986: Kokushikan University

Senior career*
Years	Team	Apps	(Gls)
1987–1995	Júbilo Iwata	157	(13)
Total		157	(13)
Medal record
Júbilo Iwata
Winner	Japan Soccer League	1987/88
Runner-up	JSL Cup	1989
Runner-up	J.League Cup	1994
Runner-up	Emperor's Cup	1989
- * Club domestic league appearances and goals

Takao Oishi (大石 隆夫, Oishi Takao; born May 25, 1964) is a former Japanese football player. His son Ryuhei Oishi is also footballer.

== Playing career ==
Oishi was born in Shizuoka Prefecture on May 25, 1964. After graduating from Kokushikan University, he joined his local club Yamaha Motors (later Júbilo Iwata) in 1987. He played many matches as offensive midfielder and forward. He retired end of 1995 season.

== Club statistics ==
Club performance			League		Cup		League Cup		Total	
Season	Club	League	Apps	Goals	Apps	Goals	Apps	Goals	Apps	Goals
Japan			League		Emperor's Cup		J.League Cup		Total	
1987/88	Yamaha Motors	JSL Division 1	14	1					14	1
1988/89	Yamaha Motors	JSL Division 1	16	0			1	0	17	0
1989/90	Yamaha Motors	JSL Division 1	17	4			5	1	22	5
1990/91	Yamaha Motors	JSL Division 1	14	1			2	0	16	1
1991/92	Yamaha Motors	JSL Division 1	20	1					20	1
1992	Yamaha Motors	Football League	16	3	2	0	-		18	3
1993	Yamaha Motors	Football League	13	1	1	1	5	1	19	3
1994	Júbilo Iwata	J1 League	30	1	1	0	0	0	31	1
1995	Júbilo Iwata	J1 League	17	1	0	0	-		17	1
Total			157	13	4	1	13	2	174	16
