= Kenji Komata =

Japanese footballer

Kenji Komata 古俣 健次
Personal information
- Full name: Kenji Komata
- Date of birth: July 15, 1964 (age 62)
- Place of birth: Niigata, Japan
- Height: 1.66 m (5 ft 5 1/2 in)
- Position: Midfielder

Youth career
- 1980–1982: Niigata Technical High School
- 1983–1986: Osaka University of Commerce

Senior career*
Years	Team	Apps	(Gls)
1987–1995	Júbilo Iwata	112	(1)
1996–1998	Albirex Niigata		
Medal record
Júbilo Iwata
Winner	Japan Soccer League	1987/88
Runner-up	JSL Cup	1989
Runner-up	J.League Cup	1994
Runner-up	Emperor's Cup	1989
- * Club domestic league appearances and goals

Kenji Komata (古俣 健次, Komata Kenji; born July 15, 1964) is a former Japanese football player.

== Playing career ==
Komata was born in Niigata Prefecture on July 15, 1964. After graduating from Osaka University of Commerce, he joined Yamaha Motors (later Júbilo Iwata) in 1987. He played as regular player as a defensive midfielder from the first season and the club won the championship in 1988. However his opportunity to play decreased in 1990s. In 1996, he moved to his local club Albireo Niigata (later Albirex Niigata) in the Regional Leagues. The club was promoted to the Japan Football League in 1998 and he retired at the end of the 1998 season.

== Club statistics ==
Club performance			League		Cup		League Cup		Total	
Season	Club	League	Apps	Goals	Apps	Goals	Apps	Goals	Apps	Goals
Japan			League		Emperor's Cup		J.League Cup		Total	
1987/88	Yamaha Motors	JSL Division 1	22	0					22	0
1988/89	Yamaha Motors	JSL Division 1	22	0					22	0
1989/90	Yamaha Motors	JSL Division 1	12	0			1	0	13	0
1990/91	Yamaha Motors	JSL Division 1	9	0			2	0	11	0
1991/92	Yamaha Motors	JSL Division 1	5	0			1	0	6	0
1992	Yamaha Motors	Football League	10	1			-		10	1
1993	Yamaha Motors	Football League	5	0	0	0	1	0	6	0
1994	Júbilo Iwata	J1 League	26	0	0	0	4	0	30	0
1995	Júbilo Iwata	J1 League	1	0	0	0	-		1	0
1996	Albireo Niigata	Regional Leagues			1	0	-		1	0
1997	Albirex Niigata	Regional Leagues			2	0	-		2	0
1998	Albirex Niigata	Football League	10	1	0	0	-		10	1
Total			122	2	3	0	9	0	134	2
