= Takuma Koga (footballer) =

Japanese association football player

Takuma Koga 古賀 琢磨
Personal information
- Full name: Takuma Koga
- Date of birth: April 30, 1969 (age 57)
- Place of birth: Shizuoka, Japan
- Height: 1.75 m (5 ft 9 in)
- Position: Defender

Youth career
- 1985–1987: Shimizu Higashi High School
- 1988–1991: Juntendo University

Senior career*
Years	Team	Apps	(Gls)
1992–1999	Júbilo Iwata	186	(6)
2000–2002	Shimizu S-Pulse	60	(0)
2003	Cerezo Osaka	16	(0)
Total		262	(6)
Medal record
Júbilo Iwata
Winner	J1 League	1997
Winner	J1 League	1999
Runner-up	J1 League	1998
Winner	J.League Cup	1998
Runner-up	J.League Cup	1994
Runner-up	J.League Cup	1997
Shimizu S-Pulse
Winner	Emperor's Cup	2001
Runner-up	Emperor's Cup	2000
Cerezo Osaka
Runner-up	Emperor's Cup	2003
- * Club domestic league appearances and goals

Takuma Koga (古賀 琢磨, Koga Takuma; born April 30, 1969) is a former Japanese football player. His younger brother Masato is also a former footballer.

== Playing career ==
Koga was born in Shizuoka Prefecture on April 30, 1969. After graduating from Juntendo University, he joined Japan Football League club Yamaha Motors (later Júbilo Iwata) in 1992. He played many matches first season and the club won the champions in 1992 and the 2nd place in 1993. The club was promoted to J1 League from 1994. From 1994, he became a regular player as right side back from and the club won the champions 1997 J1 League and 1998 J.League Cup. In Asia, the club also won the champions 1998–99 Asian Club Championship. In 1999, although the club won the champions 1999 J1 League, his opportunity to play decreased behind Kiyokazu Kudo. In 2000, he moved to across town to the Júbilo rivals Shimizu S-Pulse. From 2001, he became a regular player as left defender of three backs defense and the club won the champions 2001 Emperor's Cup. In Asia, the club won the champions in 1999–00 and the 3rd place in 2000–01 Asian Cup Winners' Cup. At 3rd place match in 2000–01, he scored an opening goal. In 2003, he moved to Cerezo Osaka and he retired end of 2003 season.

== Coaching career ==
After retirement, Koga started coaching career at Cerezo Osaka in 2004. In 2011, he signed with Football Association of Singapore as the head coach of the National Football Academy U-17 team in Singapore. The NFA U-17 team had taken part in the Lion City Cup and was also the Singapore representative that won the bronze medal at the first Youth Olympic Games.

== Club statistics ==
Club performance			League		Cup		League Cup		Total	
Season	Club	League	Apps	Goals	Apps	Goals	Apps	Goals	Apps	Goals
Japan			League		Emperor's Cup		J.League Cup		Total	
1992	Yamaha Motors	Football League	15	2			-		15	2
1993	Yamaha Motors	Football League	14	0	0	0	5	1	19	1
1994	Júbilo Iwata	J1 League	37	1	1	0	4	0	42	1
1995	Júbilo Iwata	J1 League	40	1	1	0	-		41	1
1996	Júbilo Iwata	J1 League	24	0	0	0	10	0	34	0
1997	Júbilo Iwata	J1 League	26	0	2	0	9	0	37	0
1998	Júbilo Iwata	J1 League	30	2	3	0	5	0	38	2
1999	Júbilo Iwata	J1 League	8	0	0	0	1	0	9	0
2000	Shimizu S-Pulse	J1 League	9	0	2	0	3	0	14	0
2001	Shimizu S-Pulse	J1 League	27	0	5	1	1	0	33	1
2002	Shimizu S-Pulse	J1 League	16	0	1	0	6	0	23	0
2003	Cerezo Osaka	J1 League	16	0	0	0	3	0	19	0
Total			262	6	15	1	47	1	324	8
