= Masahiro Endo =

Japanese footballer

Masahiro Endo 遠藤 昌浩
Personal information
- Date of birth: August 15, 1970 (age 56)
- Place of birth: Tokyo, Japan
- Height: 1.82 m (6 ft 0 in)
- Position: Left-back

Youth career
- 1986–1988: Teikyo High School

College career
Years	Team	Apps	(Gls)
1989–1992	Juntendo University		

Senior career*
Years	Team	Apps	(Gls)
1993–1998	Júbilo Iwata	99	(5)
1999	Yokohama FC	7	(4)
1999	Verdy Kawasaki	3	(0)
2000	Shimizu S-Pulse	7	(0)
2000–2001	Mechelen	4	(0)
2001–2002	La Louvière	1	(0)
Total		121	(9)

International career
1994	Japan	8	(0)
Medal record
Júbilo Iwata
Winner	J1 League	1997
Runner-up	J1 League	1998
Winner	J.League Cup	1998
Runner-up	J.League Cup	1994
Runner-up	J.League Cup	1997
Shimizu S-Pulse
Runner-up	Emperor's Cup	2000
- * Club domestic league appearances and goals

Masahiro Endo (遠藤 昌浩, Endō Masahiro; born August 15, 1970) is a Japanese former professional footballer who played as a left-back. At international level, he made eight appearances for the Japan national team.

== Club career ==
Endo was born in Tokyo on August 15, 1970. After graduating from Juntendo University, he joined the Japan Football League club Júbilo Iwata in 1993. The club won the second place in 1994 and was promoted to the J1 League. Although he played as a regular player until 1995, he lost the opportunity to play from 1996. After 1999, he played for Yokohama FC (1999), Verdy Kawasaki (1999) and Shimizu S-Pulse (2000). In 2000, he moved to Belgium and played for Mechelen and La Louvière. He retired in 2002.

== International career ==
On May 29, 1994, Endo debuted for the Japan national team against France. He was also selected for the 1994 Asian Games and he played full time in all matches. He played eight games for Japan in 1994.

== Career statistics ==
=== Club ===
Appearances and goals by club, season and competition
Club	Season	League			National cup (Note: Includes Emperor's Cup, Belgian Cup.)		League cup (Note: Includes J.League Cup.)		Total	
Club	Season	Division	Apps	Goals	Apps	Goals	Apps	Goals	Apps	Goals
Yamaha Motors	1993	Japan Football League	5	0	1	0	5	2	11	2
Júbilo Iwata	1994	J1 League	31	2	0	0	4	0	35	2
Júbilo Iwata	1995	J1 League	40	3	0	0	–		40	3
Júbilo Iwata	1996	J1 League	12	0	0	0	0	0	12	0
Júbilo Iwata	1997	J1 League	5	0	0	0	0	0	5	0
Júbilo Iwata	1998	J1 League	6	0	0	0	1	0	7	0
Júbilo Iwata	Total		94	5	0	0	5	0	99	51
Yokohama FC	1999	Japan Football League	7	4	0	0	–		7	4
Verdy Kawasaki	1999	J1 League	3	0	1	0	–		4	0
Shimizu S-Pulse	2000	J1 League	7	0	0	0	1	0	8	0
KV Mechelen	2000–01	Belgian First Division	4	0					4	0
La Louviére	2001–02	Belgian First Division	1	0					1	0
Career total			121	9	2	0	11	2	134	11

=== International ===
Appearances and goals by national team and year
National team	Year	Apps	Goals
Japan	1994	8	0
Total		8	0
