= Kiyokazu Kudo =

Japanese footballer

Kiyokazu Kudo 久藤 清一
Personal information
- Full name: Kiyokazu Kudo
- Date of birth: June 21, 1974 (age 52)
- Place of birth: Amagasaki, Hyogo, Japan
- Height: 1.73 m (5 ft 8 in)
- Position: Midfielder

Youth career
- 1990–1992: Chikuyo Gakuen High School

Senior career*
Years	Team	Apps	(Gls)
1993–2000	Júbilo Iwata	85	(3)
1998	→ Avispa Fukuoka (loan)	8	(1)
2000–2005	Cerezo Osaka	136	(6)
2006–2010	Avispa Fukuoka	172	(11)
Total		401	(21)

Managerial career
- 2019: Avispa Fukuoka
- 2021: Thespakusatsu Gunma
Medal record
Júbilo Iwata
Winner	J1 League	1997
Winner	J1 League	1999
Runner-up	J1 League	1998
Winner	J.League Cup	1998
Runner-up	J.League Cup	1994
Runner-up	J.League Cup	1997
Cerezo Osaka
Runner-up	Emperor's Cup	2001
Runner-up	Emperor's Cup	2003
- * Club domestic league appearances and goals

Kiyokazu Kudo (久藤 清一, Kudo Kiyokazu; born June 21, 1974) is a former Japanese football player and manager he is the current assistant coach J2 League team Júbilo Iwata.

== Playing career ==
Kudo was born in Amagasaki on June 21, 1974. After graduating from high school, he joined Yamaha Motors (later Júbilo Iwata) in 1993. He played many matches as mainly right midfielder. The club won the championships in the 1997 J1 League and 1998 J.League Cup. In late 1998, he moved to Avispa Fukuoka on loan. Although the club results were bad, the club stayed in the J1 League. In 1999, he returned to Júbilo Iwata. He became a regular player as a right side back. However he lost regular position in 2000 and he moved to Cerezo Osaka in May 2000. He could not become a regular player and the club was relegated to J2 in 2002. He then became a regular player and the club returned to J1 in 2003. He played as many positions in midfielder position. In 2006, he moved to Avispa Fukuoka. Although he played as a regular player, the club was relegated to J2 in 2007. He then played many matches as a regular player and the club was promoted to J1 in 2011. However he retired at the end of the 2010 season.

== Coaching career ==
After retirement, Kudo started his coaching career at Avispa Fukuoka in 2011. He mainly coached for the youth team. In 2016, he moved to Roasso Kumamoto and became a coach for the top team. In 2018, he returned to Avispa and became a coach for the top team. In June 2019, he became a manager as Fabio Pecchia's successor.

== Career statistics ==
Appearances and goals by club, season and competition
Club	Season	League			Emperor's Cup		J.League Cup		Total	
Club	Season	Division	Apps	Goals	Apps	Goals	Apps	Goals	Apps	Goals
Yamaha Motors	1993	Football League	0	0	0	0	0	0	0	0
Júbilo Iwata	1994	J1 League	9	0	1	0	0	0	10	0
Júbilo Iwata	1995	J1 League	15	2	2	0	—		17	2
Júbilo Iwata	1996	J1 League	20	0	1	0	1	0	22	0
Júbilo Iwata	1997	J1 League	12	1	2	0	8	1	22	2
Júbilo Iwata	1998	J1 League	9	0	0	0	1	0	10	0
Avispa Fukuoka	1998	J1 League	8	1	3	2	0	0	11	3
Júbilo Iwata	1999	J1 League	20	0	0	0	4	0	24	0
Júbilo Iwata	2000	J1 League	0	0	0	0	0	0	0	0
Cerezo Osaka	2000	J1 League	11	0	3	0	2	0	16	0
Cerezo Osaka	2001	J1 League	12	1	0	0	0	0	12	1
Cerezo Osaka	2002	J2 League	35	3	4	1	—		39	4
Cerezo Osaka	2003	J1 League	26	1	5	0	3	0	34	1
Cerezo Osaka	2004	J1 League	23	1	0	0	4	0	27	1
Cerezo Osaka	2005	J1 League	29	0	4	0	8	0	41	0
Avispa Fukuoka	2006	J1 League	29	1	0	0	4	1	33	2
Avispa Fukuoka	2007	J2 League	43	1	2	0	—		45	1
Avispa Fukuoka	2008	J2 League	34	4	1	0	—		35	4
Avispa Fukuoka	2009	J2 League	34	3	1	0	—		35	3
Avispa Fukuoka	2010	J2 League	32	2	2	0	—		34	2
Career total			401	21	31	3	35	2	467	26

== Managerial statistics ==
Update; December 31, 2018

Team	From	To	Record				
Team	From	To	G	W	D	L	Win %
Avispa Fukuoka	2019	2020					
Thespakusatsu Gunma	2021	2022					
Total			0	0	0	0	—
