= Yoshinori Higashikawa =

Japanese footballer and manager

Yoshinori Higashikawa 東川 昌典
Personal information
- Full name: Yoshinori Higashikawa
- Date of birth: September 30, 1964 (age 62)
- Place of birth: Ishikawa, Japan
- Height: 1.76 m (5 ft 9 1/2 in)
- Position: Defender

Youth career
- Kanazawa Nishi High School
- Kokushikan University

Senior career*
Years	Team	Apps	(Gls)
1988–1994	Júbilo Iwata	70	(4)
1995–1997	Honda	51	(1)
Total		121	(5)

Managerial career
- 2008–2009: V-Varen Nagasaki
Medal record
Júbilo Iwata
Runner-up	JSL Cup	1989
Runner-up	J.League Cup	1994
Runner-up	Emperor's Cup	1989
- * Club domestic league appearances and goals

Yoshinori Higashikawa (東川 昌典, Higashikawa Yoshinori; born September 30, 1964) is a former Japanese football player and manager.

== Playing career ==
Higashikawa was born in Ishikawa Prefecture on September 30, 1964. After graduating from Kokushikan University, he joined Yamaha Motors (later Júbilo Iwata) in 1988. He played many matches as side back from first season. However his opportunity to play decreased in 1990s. In 1995, he moved to the Japan Football League club Honda. He played many matches over three seasons and retired at the end of the 1997 season.

== Coaching career ==
After retirement, Higashikawa started coaching career at Honda in 1998. In 2006, he moved to newly promoted J2 League club, Ehime FC. He served as coach for the top team in 2006 and manager for the youth team in 2007. In 2008, he moved to the Regional Leagues club V-Varen Nagasaki and became a manager. The club was promoted to Japan Football League in 2009. However, the club results were poor and he was fired in June 2009.

== Club statistics ==
Club performance			League		Cup		League Cup		Total	
Season	Club	League	Apps	Goals	Apps	Goals	Apps	Goals	Apps	Goals
Japan			League		Emperor's Cup		J.League Cup		Total	
1988/89	Yamaha Motors	JSL Division 1	11	1						
1989/90	Yamaha Motors	JSL Division 1	16	0			5	0	21	0
1990/91	Yamaha Motors	JSL Division 1	8	0			0	0	8	0
1991/92	Yamaha Motors	JSL Division 1	2	0			0	0	2	0
1992	Yamaha Motors	Football League	17	3			-		17	3
1993	Yamaha Motors	Football League	1	0	0	0	3	0	4	0
1994	Júbilo Iwata	J1 League	15	0	0	0	4	0	19	0
1995	Honda	Football League	15	1	0	0	-		15	1
1996	Honda	Football League	25	0	3	0	-		28	0
1997	Honda	Football League	11	0	1	0	-		12	0
Total			121	5	4	0	12	0	137	0
