= Tetsu Nagasawa =

Japanese footballer and manager

Tetsu Nagasawa 長澤 徹
Personal information
- Full name: Tetsu Nagasawa
- Date of birth: May 28, 1968 (age 58)
- Place of birth: Osaka, Japan
- Height: 1.79 m (5 ft 10 in)
- Position: Midfielder

Team information
- Current team: Shonan Bellmare (manager)

Youth career
- 1984–1986: Shimizu Higashi High School

College career
| Years | Team | Apps | (Gls) |
| 1987–1990 | University of Tsukuba | | |

Senior career*
| Years | Team | Apps | (Gls) |
| 1991–1994 | Júbilo Iwata | 28 | (1) |
| 1995–1997 | Honda | 53 | (2) |
| Total | | 81 | (3) |

Managerial career
- 2013: Júbilo Iwata (caretaker)
- 2015–2018: Fagiano Okayama
- 2019: FC Tokyo U-23
- 2024–2025: RB Ōmiya Ardija
- 2026–: Shonan Bellmare
Medal record
Júbilo Iwata
| Runner-up | J.League Cup | 1994 |
- * Club domestic league appearances and goals

Tetsu Nagasawa (長澤 徹, Nagasawa Tetsu; born May 28, 1968) is a Japanese professional football manager and former footballer who is the manager of J2 League club Shonan Bellmare.

== Playing career ==
Nagasawa was born in Osaka Prefecture on May 28, 1968, but was raised in Matsuyama. After graduating from the University of Tsukuba, he joined Yamaha Motors (later Júbilo Iwata) in 1991. He played as a midfielder and right-back. In 1993, the club finished in 2nd place and was promoted to J1 League. However, his opportunity to play decreased in 1994. In 1995, he moved to Japan Football League club Honda. He became a regular in the line-up and played many matches until 1996. In 1997, he did not make any appearances for the club and he retired at the end of the season.

== Coaching career ==
After retirement, Nagasawa started his coaching career at Honda in 1998. In 2001, he moved to FC Tokyo. He served as coach for the club and as manager for the youth team until 2011. In 2012, he moved to his old club Júbilo Iwata and became a coach under manager Hitoshi Morishita. In May 2013, Morishita was sacked for poor results, and Nagasawa became caretaker manager, overseeing several matches, until the club appointed Takashi Sekizuka. In 2014, Nagasawa moved to J2 League club Fagiano Okayama and became a coach under manager Masanaga Kageyama. In 2015, Nagasawa succeeded Kageyama as manager. In 2016, Fagiano finished in 6th place, the highest in the club's history. He managed Fagiano until the end of the 2018 season. In 2019, he returned to FC Tokyo and became a coach under manager Kenta Hasegawa. Nagasawa also managed FC Tokyo U-23.

Ahead of the 2024 season, Nagasawa became manager of J3 League club Omiya Ardija. In his first season with the club, they secured promotion with six games remaining and finished first in the league.

In the 2025 J2 League season, Nagasawa had mixed results but was dismissed in September with the club in 8th position in the league.

In December 2025, Nagasawa was appointed manager of newly-relegated J2 League club Shonan Bellmare.

== Club statistics ==
| Club performance | | | League | | Cup | | League Cup | | Total | |
| Season | Club | League | Apps | Goals | Apps | Goals | Apps | Goals | Apps | Goals |
| Japan | | | League | | Emperor's Cup | | J.League Cup | | Total | |
|---|---|---|---|---|---|---|---|---|---|---|
| 1990/91 | Yamaha Motors | JSL Division 1 | 0 | 0 | 0 | 0 | 0 | 0 | 0 | 0 |
| 1991/92 | Yamaha Motors | JSL Division 1 | 6 | 0 | | | 0 | 0 | 6 | 0 |
| 1992 | Yamaha Motors | Football League | 0 | 0 | | | - | | 0 | 0 |
| 1993 | Yamaha Motors | Football League | 15 | 1 | 0 | 0 | 4 | 0 | 19 | 1 |
| 1994 | Júbilo Iwata | J1 League | 7 | 0 | 0 | 0 | 2 | 0 | 9 | 0 |
| 1995 | Honda | Football League | 24 | 1 | 1 | 0 | - | | 25 | 1 |
| 1996 | Honda | Football League | 29 | 1 | 3 | 0 | - | | 32 | 1 |
| 1997 | Honda | Football League | 0 | 0 | 0 | 0 | - | | 0 | 0 |
| Total | | | 81 | 3 | 4 | 0 | 6 | 0 | 91 | 3 |

== Managerial statistics ==
As of 22 April 2026

| Team | From | To | Record | | | | |
| Team | From | To | G | W | D | L | Win % |
|---|---|---|---|---|---|---|---|
| Júbilo Iwata | 2013 | 2013 | 6 | 0 | 3 | 3 | 0.00 |
| Fagiano Okayama | 2015 | 2018 | 177 | 59 | 60 | 58 | 33.33 |
| FC Tokyo U-23 | 2019 | 2019 | 34 | 9 | 9 | 16 | 26.47 |
| RB Omiya Ardija | 2024 | 2025 | 75 | 40 | 19 | 16 | 53.33 |
| Shonan Bellmare | 2026 | Present | 11 | 7 | 2 | 2 | 63.64 |
| Total | | | 292 | 108 | 91 | 93 | 36.99 |

== Honours ==
RB Omiya Ardija

- J3 League: 2024
