= Michihisa Date =

Japanese footballer

Michihisa Date 伊達 倫央
Personal information
- Full name: Michihisa Date
- Date of birth: 22 August 1966 (age 60)
- Place of birth: Shizuoka, Shizuoka, Japan
- Height: 1.80 m (5 ft 11 in)
- Position: Defender

Youth career
- 1982–1984: Shimizu Commercial High School

College career
Years	Team	Apps	(Gls)
1985–1988	University of Tsukuba		

Senior career*
Years	Team	Apps	(Gls)
1989–1994	Júbilo Iwata	106	(2)
1995–1997	Kashiwa Reysol	60	(3)
Total		166	(5)
Medal record
Júbilo Iwata
Runner-up	J.League Cup	1994
- * Club domestic league appearances and goals

Michihisa Date (伊達 倫央, Date Michihisa; born 22 August 1966) is a former Japanese football player.

== Playing career ==
Date was born in Shizuoka on 22 August 1966. After graduating from University of Tsukuba, he joined his local club Yamaha Motors (later Júbilo Iwata) in 1989. From his first season with the club, he played many matches as a centre-back. The club played in Japan Soccer League until 1992. In 1992, Japan Soccer League was folded and the club joined Japan Football League. In 1992, the club won the league. In 1993, the club finished in second place and was promoted to J1 League from 1994. In 1995, he moved to newly was promoted to J1 League club, Kashiwa Reysol. He retired at the end of the 1997 season.

== Club statistics ==
Club performance			League		Cup		League Cup		Total	
Season	Club	League	Apps	Goals	Apps	Goals	Apps	Goals	Apps	Goals
Japan			League		Emperor's Cup		J.League Cup		Total	
1989/90	Yamaha Motors	JSL Division 1	18	1			4	1	22	2
1990/91	Yamaha Motors	JSL Division 1	11	1			0	0	11	1
1991/92	Yamaha Motors	JSL Division 1	17	0			1	0	18	0
1992	Yamaha Motors	Football League	18	0			-		18	0
1993	Yamaha Motors	Football League	17	0	1	0	5	0	23	0
1994	Júbilo Iwata	J1 League	25	0	1	1	0	0	26	1
1995	Kashiwa Reysol	J1 League	28	1	1	0	-		29	1
1996	Kashiwa Reysol	J1 League	19	2	1	0	12	1	32	3
1997	Kashiwa Reysol	J1 League	13	0	2	1	0	0	15	1
Total			166	5	6	2	22	2	194	9
