= Hiroyuki Yoshida =

Japanese footballer

Hiroyuki Yoshida 吉田 裕幸
Personal information
- Full name: Hiroyuki Yoshida
- Date of birth: November 25, 1969 (age 56)
- Place of birth: Nagasaki, Japan
- Height: 1.63 m (5 ft 4 in)
- Position: Midfielder

Youth career
- 1985–1987: Kunimi High School
- 1988–1991: Kokushikan University

Senior career*
Years	Team	Apps	(Gls)
1992–1994	Júbilo Iwata	47	(3)
1995	Fukuoka Blux	1	(0)
1996	Consadole Sapporo	0	(0)
1996	Blaze Kumamoto		
1997–1998	Honda	36	(2)
Total		94	(5)
Medal record
Júbilo Iwata
Runner-up	J.League Cup	1994
- * Club domestic league appearances and goals

Hiroyuki Yoshida (吉田 裕幸, Yoshida Hiroyuki; born November 25, 1969) is a former Japanese football player.

== Playing career ==
Yoshida was born in Nagasaki Prefecture on November 25, 1969. After graduating from Kokushikan University, he joined Yamaha Motors (later Júbilo Iwata) in 1992. He played many matches as offensive midfielder from first season. However his opportunity to play decreased behind Gerald Vanenburg from 1994. From 1995, he played for Fukuoka Blux (1995), Consadole Sapporo (1996) and Blaze Kumamoto (1996). However he could hardly play in the match. In 1997, he moved to Honda. He played many matches in 2 seasons and he retired end of 1997 season.

== Club statistics ==
Club performance			League		Cup		League Cup		Total	
Season	Club	League	Apps	Goals	Apps	Goals	Apps	Goals	Apps	Goals
Japan			League		Emperor's Cup		J.League Cup		Total	
1992	Yamaha Motors	Football League	17	2			-		17	2
1993	Yamaha Motors	Football League	14	1	1	0	5	0	20	1
1994	Júbilo Iwata	J1 League	16	0	0	0	0	0	16	0
1995	Fukuoka Blux	Football League	1	0	0	0	-		1	0
1996	Consadole Sapporo	Football League	0	0	0	0	-		0	0
1996	Blaze Kumamoto	Regional Leagues								
1997	Honda	Football League	22	1	1	0	-		23	1
1998	Honda	Football League	14	1	4	0	-		18	1
Total			84	5	6	0	5	0	95	5
