= Salvatore Schillaci =

Italian footballer (1964–2024)

Salvatore Schillaci OMRI
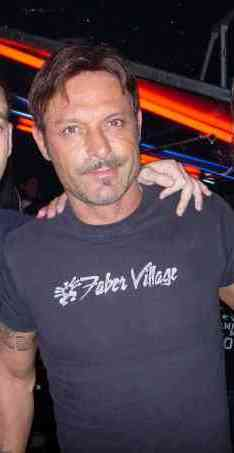
- Schillaci in 2009

Personal information
- Full name: Salvatore Schillaci
- Date of birth: 1 December 1964
- Place of birth: Palermo, Italy
- Date of death: 18 September 2024 (aged 59)
- Place of death: Palermo, Italy
- Height: 1.75 m (5 ft 9 in)
- Position: Striker

Youth career
- 1981: AMAT Palermo

Senior career*
Years	Team	Apps	(Gls)
1982–1989	Messina	219	(61)
1989–1992	Juventus	90	(26)
1992–1994	Internazionale	30	(11)
1994–1997	Júbilo Iwata	78	(56)
Total		417	(154)

International career
1989	Italy U21	1	(0)
1989	Italy B	1	(0)
1990–1991	Italy	16	(7)
Medal record
Men's football
Representing Italy
FIFA World Cup
Third place	1990 Italy
- * Club domestic league appearances and goals

Salvatore Schillaci OMRI (Italian: [salvaˈtoːre skilˈlaːtʃi]; 1 December 1964 – 18 September 2024), also known as Totò Schillaci, was an Italian professional footballer who played as a striker. During his club career, he played for Messina (1982–1989), Juventus (1989–1992), Internazionale (1992–1994) and Júbilo Iwata (1994–1997).

At the international level, Schillaci was the surprise star of the 1990 FIFA World Cup, as he helped Italy to a third-place finish on home soil. Coming on as substitute in Italy's first game, Schillaci went on to score six goals throughout the World Cup, claiming the Golden Boot as the leading goalscorer, and received the Golden Ball as player of the tournament ahead of Lothar Matthäus and Diego Maradona, who placed second and third respectively. That year he also placed second in the 1990 Ballon d'Or, behind Matthäus.

== Club career ==
Born on 1 December 1964 in Palermo, Italy, from a poor family, Schillaci started to play for an amateur team of his native city, Amat Palermo, the football team of the local bus company bearing the same name. He then signed in 1982 for the Sicilian club Messina, where he played until 1989 and showed his goal-scoring abilities, most notably winning the Serie B top-scorer award during the 1988–89 Serie B season, with 23 goals. He then joined Turin club Juventus, and made his debut in Serie A on 27 August 1989. Juventus, the "Old Lady" of Italian football, was at the time suffering from the breakup of the wonder team which dominated Italian football in the 1980s, under manager Giovanni Trapattoni; Schillaci's arrival coincided with a return to form under the direction of former legendary Juventus goalkeeper Dino Zoff. He featured prominently for the Turinese club that season, scoring 15 league goals and 21 in all competitions in a very positive year, which ended with Juventus winning both the 1989–90 Coppa Italia and the UEFA Cup titles. Due to his clever, inventive, and aggressive attacking style, he was then selected by head coach of Italy, Azeglio Vicini, to play in the 1990 FIFA World Cup, to be hosted by Italy itself, despite being a novice in the arena of national team competitions.

After the end of the 1990 World Cup, Schillaci played two more years for Juventus, alongside his Italy attacking team-mate Roberto Baggio, before joining Internazionale. Schillaci ultimately fell short of the expectations of the Inter fans, as well as those of Juventus, mainly because of the physical troubles which he suffered after the 1990 campaign. In 1994, he joined Japanese club Júbilo Iwata, becoming the first Italian player to play in the J.League, and he won the J.League Division 1 title with the club in 1997. He retired in 1999.

== International career ==
Having represented Italy U21, on 31 March 1990, Schillaci made his senior international debut for Italy under manager Azeglio Vicini in a 1–0 friendly away victory over Switzerland, in Basel. He was subsequently called up for Italy's squad for the 1990 FIFA World Cup that was played on home soil.

At the 1990 FIFA World Cup, Schillaci replaced Andrea Carnevale during Italy's first match against Austria. He scored as the match ended with a 1–0 win for Italy. Against Czechoslovakia, alongside Roberto Baggio. Italy won 2–0, with Baggio and Schillaci both scoring. Schillaci started alongside Baggio in Italy's next two matches of the knock-out stages, also opening the scoring in the round of 16 and quarter-finals, against Uruguay and the Republic of Ireland respectively, and set up Aldo Serena's goal against Uruguay.

For the semi-final match against defending champions Argentina, Gianluca Vialli replaced Baggio in the starting line-up, whereas Schillaci kept his place in the team. The match ended 1–1, with Schillaci scoring his fifth goal of the tournament, but Italy were eliminated after a penalty shoot-out, in which he refused to take a penalty, citing injury as his reason.

After setting up Baggio's opening goal, Schillaci scored the winning goal in Italy's 2–1 win in the third-place match against England from a penalty, and won the Golden Boot, with six goals, as well as the Golden Ball Award for the best player of the tournament. Overall, he scored seven goals in sixteen caps for Italy between 1990 and 1991, scoring his only other goal for Italy in a 2–1 defeat away against Norway, in 1991, in a UEFA Euro 1992 qualifying match.

== Style of play ==
Schillaci was a small, quick, agile, and mobile striker, with an eye for the goal, and solid technique. A prolific, reliable, and opportunistic goalscorer, Schillaci was known in particular for his anticipation, reactions, and his excellent positional sense, which, along with his acceleration, enabled him to make attacking runs to beat opponents to the ball in the area, giving him the reputation for frequently being "in the right place at the right time". He was capable of finishing well both inside and outside the area, as well as from volleys, with powerful strikes, and was capable of scoring with his head as well as with his feet, despite not being particularly imposing in the air; he was also accurate on set pieces and effective on penalties. Although he was primarily known for his selfish and instinctive style of play, he was also capable of linking-up with and playing off of his team-mates, despite not being a particularly notable passer. Due to his goalscoring exploits, his former Messina manager Francesco Scoglio described him by saying he had "never seen a player who wanted to score as much as him."

== Retirement ==
Schillaci retired in 1999. He returned to his native Palermo, where he owned a youth academy of football.

He appeared as a guest on Craig Doyle Live during UEFA Euro 2012. Former South Africa national team captain Steven Pienaar is nicknamed Schillo after Schillaci.

== Personal life and death ==
Schillaci's nephew Francesco Di Mariano and cousin Antonio Maurizio Schillaci have also played professional football. He married twice and had three children. He considered himself Catholic.

Schillaci was diagnosed with colon cancer in 2022. In September 2024, he was hospitalised with an atrial arrhythmia. Schillaci died on the morning of 18 September 2024, at the age of 59. Inter Milan led the tributes to Schillaci, stating: "He made an entire nation dream during the Magic Nights of Italia 90".

== Career statistics ==
=== Club ===
Appearances and goals by club, season and competition
Club	Season	League			Cup		Continental		Other		Total	
Club	Season	Division	Apps	Goals	Apps	Goals	Apps	Goals	Apps	Goals	Apps	Goals
Messina	1982–83	Serie C2	26	3	—		—		—		26	3
Messina	1983–84	Serie C1	26	4	—		—		—		26	4
Messina	1984–85	Serie C1	31	4	—		—		—		31	4
Messina	1985–86	Serie C1	31	11	6	1	—		—		37	12
Messina	1986–87	Serie B	33	3	3	2	—		—		36	5
Messina	1987–88	Serie B	37	13	5	2	—		—		42	15
Messina	1988–89	Serie B	35	23	4	2	—		—		39	25
Messina	Total		219	61	18	7	—		—		237	68
Juventus	1989–90	Serie A	30	15	8	2	12	4	—		50	21
Juventus	1990–91	Serie A	29	5	5	0	7	3	1	0	42	8
Juventus	1991–92	Serie A	31	6	9	1	—		—		40	7
Juventus	Total		90	26	22	3	19	7	1	0	132	36
Inter Milan	1992–93	Serie A	21	6	2	1	—		—		23	7
Inter Milan	1993–94	Serie A	9	5	1	0	3	0	—		13	5
Inter Milan	Total		30	11	3	1	3	0	—		36	12
Júbilo Iwata	1994	J1 League	18	9	1	0	4	5	—		23	14
Júbilo Iwata	1995	J1 League	34	31	0	0	—		—		34	31
Júbilo Iwata	1996	J1 League	23	15	0	0	8	3	—		31	18
Júbilo Iwata	1997	J1 League	3	1	0	0	2	1	—		5	2
Júbilo Iwata	Total		78	56	1	0	14	9	—		93	65
Career total			417	154	44	11	36	16	1	0	498	181

=== International ===
Appearances and goals by national team and year
National team	Year	Apps	Goals
Italy	1990	12	6
Italy	1991	4	1
Total		16	7

Scores and results list Italy's goal tally first.

#	Date	Venue	Opponent	Score	Result	Competition
1	9 June 1990	Stadio Olimpico, Rome	Austria	1–0	1–0	1990 FIFA World Cup
2	19 June 1990	Stadio Olimpico, Rome	Czechoslovakia	1–0	2–0	1990 FIFA World Cup
3	25 June 1990	Stadio Olimpico, Rome	Uruguay	1–0	2–0	1990 FIFA World Cup
4	30 June 1990	Stadio Olimpico, Rome	Republic of Ireland	1–0	1–0	1990 FIFA World Cup
5	3 July 1990	Stadio San Paolo, Naples	Argentina	1–0	1–1 (aet, 3–4 pen.)	1990 FIFA World Cup
6	7 July 1990	Stadio San Nicola, Bari	England	2–1	2–1	1990 FIFA World Cup
7	5 June 1991	Ullevaal Stadion, Oslo	Norway	1–2	1–2	UEFA Euro 1992 qualifier

== Honours ==
Messina

- Serie C1: 1985–86
- Serie C2: 1982–83

Juventus

- Coppa Italia: 1989–90
- UEFA Cup: 1989–90

Internazionale

- UEFA Cup: 1993–94

Júbilo Iwata

- J.League: 1997

Italy

- FIFA World Cup third place: 1990

Individual

- Serie B top-scorer: 1988–89
- FIFA World Cup Golden Boot: 1990
- FIFA World Cup Golden Ball: 1990
- FIFA World Cup All-Star Team: 1990
- Ballon d'Or second place: 1990
- Onze d'Argent: 1990

Orders

5th Class / Knight: Cavaliere Ordine al Merito della Repubblica Italiana: 1991

== See also ==
- List of FIFA World Cup top goalscorers
