= 1994 J.League Cup =

J.League Yamazaki Nabisco Cup

Tournament details
- Country: Japan
- Dates: 27 July and 6 August 1994
- Teams: 14

Final positions
- Champions: Verdy Kawasaki (3rd title)
- Runners-up: Júbilo Iwata
- Semifinalists: Yokohama Marinos; Gamba Osaka

Tournament statistics
- Matches played: 13
- Goals scored: 38 (2.92 per match)

The 1994 J. League Cup, officially the '94 J.League Yamazaki Nabisco Cup, was the 20th edition of Japan soccer league cup tournament and the third edition under the current J. League Cup format. The championship started on July 27, and finished on August 6, 1994.

== First round ==
July 27

Nagoya Grampus	1–3	JEF Ichihara

July 27

Gamba Osaka	2–1	Sanfrecce Hiroshima

July 27

Kashima Antlers	1–2	Urawa Reds

July 27

Kashiwa Reysol	1–2	Yokohama Marinos

July 27

Yokohama Flügels	1–0	Cerezo Osaka

July 27

Júbilo Iwata	2–1	Bellmare Hiratsuka

== Quarterfinals ==
July 30

Shimizu S-Pulse	1–3	Yokohama Marinos

July 30

Verdy Kawasaki	1–0	JEF Ichihara

July 30

Gamba Osaka	3–0	Urawa Reds

July 30

Yokohama Flügels	0–2	Júbilo Iwata

== Semifinals ==
August 3

Verdy Kawasaki	7–1	Gamba Osaka

August 3

Yokohama Marinos	0–1	Júbilo Iwata

== Final ==
August 6 19:04

Verdy Kawasaki	2–0	Júbilo Iwata
Bentinho 34'; Bismarck 42'

Universiade Stadium, Kobe
Attendance: 37,475
