= 1997 Yokohama Marinos season =

Yokohama Marinos
1997 season
- Manager: Xabier Azkargorta
- Stadium: Yokohama Mitsuzawa Stadium
- J.League: 3rd
- Emperor's Cup: 4th Round
- J.League Cup: GL-B 4th
- Top goalscorer: Julio Salinas (21)
Home colours	Away colours

1997 Yokohama Marinos season

== Competitions ==
Competitions	Position
J.League	3rd / 17 clubs
Emperor's Cup	4th round
J.League Cup	GL-B 4th / 4 clubs

== Domestic results ==
=== J.League ===
12 April 1997 1-1	Urawa Red Diamonds	2-3	Yokohama Marinos	Urawa Komaba Stadium
JST (UTC+09)

16 April 1997 1-2	Yokohama Marinos	0-4	Gamba Osaka	Yokohama Mitsuzawa Stadium
JST (UTC+09)

19 April 1997 1-3	Verdy Kawasaki	2-2 (GG) (a.e.t.) (3-4 p)	Yokohama Marinos	Todoroki Athletics Stadium
JST (UTC+09)

23 April 1997 1-4	Yokohama Marinos	3-1	Kyoto Purple Sanga	Yokohama Mitsuzawa Stadium
JST (UTC+09)

26 April 1997 1-5	JEF United Ichihara	1-2	Yokohama Marinos	Ichihara Seaside Stadium
JST (UTC+09)

3 May 1997 1-6	Yokohama Marinos	2-4	Bellmare Hiratsuka	Yokohama Mitsuzawa Stadium
JST (UTC+09)

1-7	bye

10 May 1997 1-8	Shimizu S-Pulse	1-2 (GG) (a.e.t.)	Yokohama Marinos	Nihondaira Sports Stadium
JST (UTC+09)

17 May 1997 1-9	Yokohama Marinos	4-2	Sanfrecce Hiroshima	Yokohama Mitsuzawa Stadium
JST (UTC+09)

24 May 1997 1-10	Avispa Fukuoka	1-3	Yokohama Marinos	Hakatanomori Football Stadium
JST (UTC+09)

28 May 1997 1-11	Yokohama Marinos	3-2 (GG) (a.e.t.)	Cerezo Osaka	Yokohama Mitsuzawa Stadium
JST (UTC+09)

31 May 1997 1-12	Vissel Kobe	2-1	Yokohama Marinos	Kobe Universiade Memorial Stadium
JST (UTC+09)

5 July 1997 1-13	Yokohama Marinos	0-3	Kashima Antlers	Yokohama Mitsuzawa Stadium
JST (UTC+09)

9 July 1997 1-14	Nagoya Grampus Eight	0-1	Yokohama Marinos	Mizuho Athletic Stadium
JST (UTC+09)

12 July 1997 1-15	Yokohama Marinos	1-0	Yokohama Flügels	Yokohama Mitsuzawa Stadium
JST (UTC+09)

16 July 1997 1-16	Júbilo Iwata	3-4 (GG) (a.e.t.)	Yokohama Marinos	Júbilo Iwata Stadium
JST (UTC+09)

19 July 1997 1-17	Yokohama Marinos	0-3	Kashiwa Reysol	Yokohama Mitsuzawa Stadium
JST (UTC+09)

30 July 1997 2-1	Yokohama Marinos	1-4	Júbilo Iwata	Yokohama Mitsuzawa Stadium
JST (UTC+09)

2 August 1997 2-2	Yokohama Marinos	0-2	Urawa Red Diamonds	Yokohama Mitsuzawa Stadium
JST (UTC+09)

6 August 1997 2-3	Gamba Osaka	3-4	Yokohama Marinos	Ishikawa Kanazawa Stadium
JST (UTC+09)

9 August 1997 2-4	Yokohama Marinos	7-2	Verdy Kawasaki	Yamagata Park Stadium
JST (UTC+09)

15 August 1997 2-5	Kyoto Purple Sanga	1-4	Yokohama Marinos	Nishikyogoku Athletic Stadium
JST (UTC+09)

20 August 1997 2-6	Yokohama Marinos	2-1 (GG) (a.e.t.)	JEF United Ichihara	Yokohama Mitsuzawa Stadium
JST (UTC+09)

23 August 1997 2-7	Bellmare Hiratsuka	1-3	Yokohama Marinos	Hiratsuka Athletics Stadium
JST (UTC+09)

2-8	bye

3 September 1997 2-9	Yokohama Marinos	1-0 (GG) (a.e.t.)	Shimizu S-Pulse	Yokohama Mitsuzawa Stadium
JST (UTC+09)

6 September 1997 2-10	Sanfrecce Hiroshima	2-3 (GG) (a.e.t.)	Yokohama Marinos	Hiroshima Big Arch
JST (UTC+09)

10 September 1997 2-11	Yokohama Flügels	2-3	Yokohama Marinos	Yokohama Mitsuzawa Stadium
JST (UTC+09)

13 September 1997 2-12	Yokohama Marinos	4-1	Avispa Fukuoka	Yokohama Mitsuzawa Stadium
JST (UTC+09)

20 September 1997 2-13	Yokohama Marinos	2-1	Vissel Kobe	Yokohama Mitsuzawa Stadium
JST (UTC+09)

24 September 1997 2-14	Cerezo Osaka	2-3 (GG) (a.e.t.)	Yokohama Marinos	Osaka Nagai Stadium
JST (UTC+09)

27 September 1997 2-15	Kashima Antlers	2-1	Yokohama Marinos	Kashima Soccer Stadium
JST (UTC+09)

1 October 1997 2-16	Yokohama Marinos	1-2	Nagoya Grampus Eight	Yokohama Mitsuzawa Stadium
JST (UTC+09)

4 October 1997 2-17	Kashiwa Reysol	2-3	Yokohama Marinos	Hitachi Kashiwa Soccer Stadium
JST (UTC+09)

=== Emperor's Cup ===
1st Round	bye

2nd Round	bye

14 December 1997 3rd Round	Yokohama Marinos	5-0	Momoyama Gakuin University	Hakatanomori Football Stadium
JST (UTC+09)

20 December 1997 4th Round	Yokohama Marinos	1-2	Tokyo Gas	Gifu Nagaragawa Stadium
JST (UTC+09)

=== J.League Cup ===
8 March 1997 GL-B-1	Verdy Kawasaki	1-1	Yokohama Marinos	Tokyo National Stadium
JST (UTC+09)

15 March 1997 GL-B-2	Yokohama Marinos	3-4	Gamba Osaka	Yokohama Mitsuzawa Stadium
JST (UTC+09)

19 March 1997 GL-B-3	Yokohama Marinos	1-3	Consadole Sapporo	Yokohama Mitsuzawa Stadium
JST (UTC+09)

22 March 1997 GL-B-4	Gamba Osaka	1-2	Yokohama Marinos	Osaka Expo '70 Stadium
JST (UTC+09)

26 March 1997 GL-B-5	Consadole Sapporo	1-2	Yokohama Marinos	Gifu Nagaragawa Stadium
JST (UTC+09)

29 March 1997 GL-B-6	Yokohama Marinos	1-2	Verdy Kawasaki	Yokohama Mitsuzawa Stadium
JST (UTC+09)

== Player statistics ==
No.	Pos.	Nat.	Player	D.o.B. (Age)	Height / Weight	J.League		Emperor's Cup		J.League Cup		Total	
No.	Pos.	Nat.	Player	D.o.B. (Age)	Height / Weight	Apps	Goals	Apps	Goals	Apps	Goals	Apps	Goals
1	GK	(Japan)	Yoshikatsu Kawaguchi	August 15, 1975 (aged 21)	181 cm / 75 kg	22	0	2	0	0	0	24	0
2	DF	(Japan)	Eiji Gaya	February 8, 1969 (aged 28)	176 cm / 69 kg	26	0	0	0	5	0	31	0
3	DF	(Japan)	Takehito Suzuki	June 11, 1971 (aged 25)	177 cm / 72 kg	22	1	0	0	0	0	22	1
4	DF	(Japan)	Masami Ihara	September 18, 1967 (aged 29)	182 cm / 72 kg	22	0	2	0	0	0	24	0
5	DF	(Japan)	Norio Omura	September 6, 1969 (aged 27)	180 cm / 75 kg	9	0	2	0	0	0	11	0
6	MF	(Japan)	Yoshiharu Ueno	April 21, 1973 (aged 23)	181 cm / 70 kg	30	2	2	0	5	1	37	3
7	FW	(Spain)	Salinas	September 1, 1962 (aged 34)	188 cm / 82 kg	26	21	2	2	5	3	33	26
8	MF	(Japan)	Satoru Noda	March 19, 1969 (aged 27)	174 cm / 68 kg	25	1	2	0	5	0	32	1
9	FW	(Japan)	Shoji Jo	June 17, 1975 (aged 21)	179 cm / 72 kg	21	12	2	2	0	0	23	14
10	MF	(Bolivia)	Baldivieso	December 2, 1971 (aged 25)	180 cm / 76 kg	22	9	2	0	5	1	29	10
11	MF	(Japan)	Fumitake Miura	August 12, 1970 (aged 26)	174 cm / 70 kg	27	3	1	0	6	1	34	4
12	FW	(Japan)	Kenichi Hashimoto	April 16, 1975 (aged 21)	177 cm / 70 kg	0	0	0	0	1	0	1	0
13	DF	(Japan)	Kunio Nagayama	September 16, 1970 (aged 26)	171 cm / 65 kg	18	1	2	0	2	0	22	1
14	DF	(Japan)	Naoki Matsuda	March 14, 1977 (aged 19)	180 cm / 70 kg	31	2	2	0	6	0	39	2
15	DF	(Japan)	Masaharu Suzuki	August 3, 1970 (aged 26)	168 cm / 63 kg	0	0	0	0	6	0	6	0
16	GK	(Japan)	Masahiko Nakagawa	August 26, 1969 (aged 27)	180 cm / 72 kg	0	0	0	0	6	0	6	0
17	FW	(Japan)	Sotaro Yasunaga	April 20, 1976 (aged 20)	178 cm / 68 kg	9	1	0	0	6	2	15	3
18	MF	(Japan)	Akihiro Endo	September 18, 1975 (aged 21)	172 cm / 65 kg	15	0	2	0	3	0	20	0
19	MF	(Japan)	Yoshito Terakawa	September 6, 1974 (aged 22)	174 cm / 62 kg	10	0	0	0	4	0	14	0
20	MF/DF	(Japan)	Ryuji Kubota	July 24, 1976 (aged 20)	184 cm / 77 kg	0	0		0	0	0		0
21	GK	(Japan)	Takuya Ito	December 30, 1976 (aged 20)	180 cm / 70 kg	0	0		0	0	0		0
22	MF	(Japan)	Takahiro Yamada	April 29, 1972 (aged 24)	174 cm / 70 kg	25	6	0	0	5	0	30	6
23	MF	(Japan)	Tomokazu Hirama	June 30, 1977 (aged 19)	171 cm / 62 kg	13	3	2	0	0	0	15	3
24	DF	(Japan)	Kei Mikuriya	August 29, 1977 (aged 19)	171 cm / 64 kg	0	0		0	0	0		0
25	MF	(Japan)	Shunsuke Nakamura	June 24, 1978 (aged 18)	178 cm / 66 kg	27	5	1	0	3	0	31	5
26	DF	(Japan)	Yoshiaki Maruyama	October 12, 1974 (aged 22)	176 cm / 71 kg	8	0	0	0	6	1	14	1
27	MF/DF	(Japan)	Satoshi Kusayanagi	April 3, 1977 (aged 19)	167 cm / 65 kg	0	0		0	0	0		0
28	MF	(Japan)	Takayuki Nakamaru	May 28, 1977 (aged 19)	172 cm / 65 kg	0	0		0	0	0		0
29	DF	(Japan)	Masatoshi Tanaka	April 5, 1977 (aged 19)	178 cm / 71 kg	0	0		0	0	0		0
30	FW	(Japan)	Hideki Matsuki	September 5, 1977 (aged 19)	178 cm / 70 kg	0	0		0	0	0		0
31	GK	(Japan)	Shinya Yoshihara	April 19, 1978 (aged 18)	185 cm / 75 kg	0	0		0	0	0		0
32	GK	(Japan)	Tatsuya Enomoto	March 16, 1979 (aged 17)	190 cm / 75 kg	0	0		0	0	0		0
33	MF	(Japan)	Manabu Tomita	June 15, 1978 (aged 18)	174 cm / 65 kg	0	0		0	0	0		0
34	MF	(Japan)	Masahiro Fukazawa †	July 12, 1977 (aged 19)	-cm / -kg	0	0		0	0	0		0
15	DF	(Serbia and Montenegro)	Petković †	June 13, 1974 (aged 22)	-cm / -kg	11	2	0	0	0	0	11	2
36	GK	(Japan)	Kazumasa Kawano †	November 7, 1970 (aged 26)	185 cm / 82 kg	10	0	0	0	0	0	10	0
30	DF	(Japan)	Kazunari Okayama †	April 24, 1978 (aged 18)	-cm / -kg	8	3	2	1	0	0	10	4

- † player(s) joined the team after the opening of this season.

== Transfers ==
In:

No.	Pos.	Nation	Player
31	GK	JPN	Shinya Yoshihara (from Hitachi Kogyo High School)
32	GK	JPN	Tatsuya Enomoto (from Urawagakuin High School)
2	DF	JPN	Eiji Gaya (from Kashima Antlers)
26	DF	JPN	Yoshiaki Maruyama (from Waseda University)
10	MF	BOL	Julio César Baldivieso Rico (from Bolívar)
25	MF	JPN	Shunsuke Nakamura (from Toko Gakuen Senior High School)
33	MF	JPN	Manabu Tomita (from Yokohama Marinos youth)
7	FW	ESP	Julio Salinas Fernández (from Sporting Gijón)
9	FW	JPN	Shoji Jo (from JEF United Ichihara)
12	FW	JPN	Kenichi Hashimoto (from Kashima Antlers)

Out:

No.	Pos.	Nation	Player
—	GK	JPN	Eiichiro Yamada (to Blaze Kumamoto)
—	GK	JPN	Daijiro Takakuwa (to Kashima Antlers)
—	DF	JPN	Tetsuya Ito (to Sanfrecce Hiroshima)
—	DF	JPN	Kensaku Omori (to Kashima Antlers)
—	DF	JPN	Yoshio Koido (to Otsuka F.C.)
—	DF	JPN	Fumiyasu Hata (retired)
—	DF	JPN	Noriaki Tsutsui (to Otsuka F.C.)
—	DF	JPN	Masayuki Miyazawa
—	MF	ARG	Zapata
—	MF	ARG	Bisconti
—	MF	JPN	Masato Koga (to Sagan Tosu)
—	MF	JPN	Mitsunobu Moriya
—	MF	JPN	Shusuke Shimada
—	MF	JPN	Naoto Muramatsu
—	MF	ARG	Figueroa
—	FW	ARG	Acosta
—	FW	JPN	Yosuke Fukase
—	FW	JPN	Masahiro Fukazawa

== Transfers during the season ==
=== In ===
- (Japan) Masahiro Fukazawa (loan return from River Plate on June)
- (Serbia and Montenegro) Petković (from OFK Beograd on August)
- (Japan) Kazumasa Kawano (from Nagoya Grampus Eight)
- (Japan) Kazunari Okayama (from Hatsushiba Hashimoto Senior High School)

=== Out ===
- (Japan) Masaharu Suzuki (to Nagoya Grampus Eight)
- (Japan) Hideki Matsuki
- (Japan) Sotaro Yasunaga (loan to Lleida on August)

== Awards ==
- J.League Best XI: (Japan) Masami Ihara

== Other pages ==
- (in Japanese) J. League official site
- (in Japanese) Yokohama F. Marinos official site
