= 1996 Yokohama Marinos season =

Yokohama Marinos
1996 season
- Manager: Hiroshi Hayano
- Stadium: Yokohama Mitsuzawa Football Stadium
- J.League: 8th
- Emperor's Cup: 3rd Round
- J.League Cup: GL-A 4th
- Super Cup: Runners-up
- Sanwa Bank Cup: Runners-up
- Asian Club Championship: Quarterfinals
- Top goalscorer: League: Acosta (10); All: Acosta (18)
- Highest home attendance: 13,978 (vs Bellmare Hiratsuka, 31 August 1996); 28,584 (vs JEF United Ichihara, 6 April 1996, Tokyo National Stadium)
- Lowest home attendance: 8,395 (vs Kashiwa Reysol, 15 May 1996)
- Average home league attendance: 14,589
| Home colours | Away colours |

1996 Yokohama Marinos season

== Review and events ==
=== League results summary ===
| Overall | | | | | | | | Home | | | | | | Away | | | | | |
| Pld | W | D | L | GF | GA | GD | Pts | W | D | L | GF | GA | GD | W | D | L | GF | GA | GD |
|---|---|---|---|---|---|---|---|---|---|---|---|---|---|---|---|---|---|---|---|
| 30 | 14 | 0 | 16 | 39 | 40 | −1 | 42 | 6 | 0 | 9 | 16 | 18 | −2 | 8 | 0 | 7 | 23 | 22 | +1 |

Source: J.LEAGUE OFFICIAL GUIDE 1997. ISBN 4-09-102329-0.

=== League results by round ===
| Round | 1 | 2 | 3 | 4 | 5 | 6 | 7 | 8 | 9 | 10 | 11 | 12 | 13 | 14 | 15 | 16 | 17 | 18 | 19 | 20 | 21 | 22 | 23 | 24 | 25 | 26 | 27 | 28 | 29 | 30 |
|---|---|---|---|---|---|---|---|---|---|---|---|---|---|---|---|---|---|---|---|---|---|---|---|---|---|---|---|---|---|---|
| Ground | H | H | A | H | A | H | A | H | A | A | H | H | A | H | A | A | H | A | H | A | A | H | A | H | A | H | A | H | A | H |
| Result | L | L | L | L | L | W | L | W | W | W | L | W | W | L | W | W | W | L | W | W | L | L | L | L | W | L | L | L | W | W |
| Position | 9 | 12 | 14 | 14 | 15 | 13 | 15 | 12 | 13 | 10 | 11 | 10 | 8 | 10 | 10 | 8 | 8 | 8 | 8 | 8 | 9 | 9 | 9 | 9 | 9 | 9 | 9 | 9 | 9 | 8 |

Source: J.LEAGUE OFFICIAL GUIDE 1997. ISBN 4-09-102329-0.
A = Away; H = Home; W = Win; D = Draw; L = Loss

== Competitions ==
| Competitions | Position |
|---|---|
| J.League | 8th / 16 clubs |
| Emperor's Cup | 3rd round |
| J.League Cup | GL-A 4th / 8 clubs |
| Super Cup | Runners-up |
| Sanwa Bank Cup | Runners-up |
| Asian Club Championship | Quarterfinals |

== Domestic results ==
=== J.League ===
| 16 March 1996 1 | Yokohama Marinos | 1–2 | Gamba Osaka | Yokohama Mitsuzawa Football Stadium |
| 19:05 JST (UTC+09) | Acosta 46' | J. League | Mladenović 44', 58' | Attendance: 11,728; Referee: Yasuhiro Matsuzaki; Assistant referees: Yū Nakamura, Toshiyuki Mayuzumi; Fourth official: Tasuku Onodera |

| 20 March 1996 2 | Yokohama Marinos | 0–1 (V-goal) (a.e.t.) | Júbilo Iwata | Yokohama Mitsuzawa Football Stadium |
| 15:03 JST (UTC+09) | | J. League | Nanami 95' | Attendance: 12,840; Referee: Kazuo Kakihana; Assistant referees: Masahiro Katagiri, Susumu Takeda; Fourth official: Hiroshi Yamaguchi |

| 23 March 1996 3 | Urawa Red Diamonds | 2–0 | Yokohama Marinos | Tokyo National Stadium |
| 19:03 JST (UTC+09) | Fukunaga 56'; Bein 58' | J. League | | Attendance: 49,094; Referee: Keiichi Sunakawa; Assistant referees: Hiroshi Fukuda, Ichirō Inukai; Fourth official: Noritake Sakurada |

| 30 March 1996 4 | Yokohama Marinos | 0–1 | Nagoya Grampus Eight | Yokohama Mitsuzawa Football Stadium |
| 15:05 JST (UTC+09) | | J. League | Durix 2' | Attendance: 12,013; Referee: Zoran Petrović; Assistant referees: Kazuaki Hamaguchi, Takuji Fukazawa; Fourth official: Haruo Suzuki |

| 3 April 1996 5 | Verdy Kawasaki | 3–2 (V-goal) (a.e.t.) | Yokohama Marinos | Tokyo National Stadium |
| 19:00 JST (UTC+09) | Hashiratani 18'; K. Miura 86'; Bismarck 90' | J. League | T. Yamada 43'; T. Suzuki 88' | Attendance: 35,518; Referee: Hideo Kikuchi; Assistant referees: Toshimitsu Yoshida, Akihisa Makino; Fourth official: Tsutomu Anazawa |

| 6 April 1996 6 | Yokohama Marinos | 2–1 | JEF United Ichihara | Tokyo National Stadium |
| 19:04 JST (UTC+09) | Acosta 52', 61' | J. League | Nakanishi 87' | Attendance: 28,584; Referee: Masayoshi Okada; Assistant referees: Kazuhisa Osada, Kōji Taniuchi; Fourth official: Masao Yamanaka |

| 13 April 1996 7 | Kashima Antlers | 3–1 | Yokohama Marinos | Kashima Soccer Stadium |
| 15:00 JST (UTC+09) | Hasegawa 17'; Leonardo 58'; Masuda 83' | J. League | Gorosito 23' | Attendance: 16,034; Referee: Tatsumi Ōno; Assistant referees: Kōji Minami, Keiji Kamiara; Fourth official: Kazushiro Miyajima |

| 17 April 1996 8 | Yokohama Marinos | 3–0 | Cerezo Osaka | Yokohama Mitsuzawa Football Stadium |
| 19:03 JST (UTC+09) | Bisconti 8'; Gorosito 34'; Mikuriya 44' | J. League | | Attendance: 10,057; Referee: Zoran Petrović; Assistant referees: Kimio Izaki, Hitoshi Nakagomi; Fourth official: Takeshi Ōgiya |

| 20 April 1996 9 | Yokohama Flügels | 1–2 (V-goal) (a.e.t.) | Yokohama Marinos | Yokohama Mitsuzawa Football Stadium |
| 15:00 JST (UTC+09) | Zinho 76' | J. League | Ihara 55'; Noda 100' | Attendance: 13,670; Referee: Yasuhiro Matsuzaki; Assistant referees: Toshiyuki Mayuzumi, Takuji Fukazawa; Fourth official: Michio Nakahara |

| 27 April 1996 10 | Sanfrecce Hiroshima | 0–3 | Yokohama Marinos | Hiroshima Big Arch |
| 14:35 JST (UTC+09) | | J. League | Gorosito 58'; Noda 60'; Miura 85' | Attendance: 12,453; Referee: Piotr Werner; Assistant referees: Morihisa Yamaguchi, Takashi Aoki; Fourth official: Kazuyuki Tanimoto |

| 1 May 1996 11 | Yokohama Marinos | 1–2 | Shimizu S-Pulse | Tokyo National Stadium |
| 19:04 JST (UTC+09) | Bisconti 49' | J. League | Toninho 30'; Sawanobori 64' | Attendance: 25,782; Referee: Zoran Petrović; Assistant referees: Noboru Ishiyama, Ichirō Inukai; Fourth official: Kimihiko Dakiyama |

| 4 May 1996 12 | Yokohama Marinos | 1–0 | Kyoto Purple Sanga | Yokohama Mitsuzawa Football Stadium |
| 15:03 JST (UTC+09) | Noda 69' | J. League | | Attendance: 12,533; Referee: Tetsuya Hamana; Assistant referees: Mitsuru Satō, Susumu Takeda; Fourth official: Kazuhiko Uchida |

| 11 May 1996 13 | Bellmare Hiratsuka | 0–2 | Yokohama Marinos | Tokyo National Stadium |
| 18:34 JST (UTC+09) | | J. League | Miura 44'; Bisconti 78' | Attendance: 31,699; Referee: Archundia; Assistant referees: Hisaharu Kitamura, Hitoshi Nakagomi; Fourth official: Tsutomu Anazawa |

| 15 May 1996 14 | Yokohama Marinos | 1–2 | Kashiwa Reysol | Yokohama Mitsuzawa Football Stadium |
| 19:03 JST (UTC+09) | T. Suzuki 40' | J. League | Edílson 57'; 65' (o.g.) | Attendance: 8,395; Referee: Fumikazu Shioyazono; Assistant referees: Takashi Kunori, Satoru Ishizawa; Fourth official: Hiroshi Yamaguchi |

| 18 May 1996 15 | Avispa Fukuoka | 0–1 | Yokohama Marinos | Hakatanomori Football Stadium |
| 15:03 JST (UTC+09) | | J. League | Endō 29' | Attendance: 14,295; Referee: Piotr Werner; Assistant referees: Kazuya Yanagisawa, Tōru Yamashiro; Fourth official: Daikichi Kanada |

| 28 August 1996 16 | Kyoto Purple Sanga | 0–3 | Yokohama Marinos | Kyoto Nishikyogoku Stadium |
| 19:04 JST (UTC+09) | | J. League | Acosta 5'; Noda 7'; Bisconti 37' | Attendance: 13,848; Referee: Leslie Mottram; Assistant referees: Naoki Esumi, Ichirō Inukai; Fourth official: Yoshihisa Takahashi |

| 31 August 1996 17 | Yokohama Marinos | 2–1 | Bellmare Hiratsuka | Yokohama Mitsuzawa Football Stadium |
| 19:07 JST (UTC+09) | Acosta 28'; Omura 78' | J. League | Simão 44' | Attendance: 13,978; Referee: Shinichirō Obata; Assistant referees: Kimio Izaki, Susumu Takeda; Fourth official: Toshiya Kumagai |

| 7 September 1996 18 | Kashiwa Reysol | 4–0 | Yokohama Marinos | Niigata Stadium |
| 18:30 JST (UTC+09) | Yoshida 16'; Sakai 41'; 73' (o.g.); Wagner 88' | J. League | | Attendance: 11,883; Referee: Leslie Mottram; Assistant referees: Mitsuru Satō, Masaaki Shimomura; Fourth official: Hiroshi Abe |

| 14 September 1996 19 | Yokohama Marinos | 0–0 (V-goal) (a.e.t.) (3–1 p) | Avispa Fukuoka | Nagasaki Stadium |
| 18:34 JST (UTC+09) | | J. League | | Attendance: 10,268; Referee: Bemard Saules; Assistant referees: Hiroyuki Izumi, Hiroyuki Ōnishi; Fourth official: Ryōichi Kanasaki |
| | Penalties |
| | (penalty scored) Noda; (penalty scored) Miura; (penalty scored) M. Suzuki; (penalty missed) T. Suzuki | | (penalty scored) Mayor; (penalty missed) Mori; (penalty missed) Ishimaru; (penalty missed) Nakagomi |

| 21 September 1996 20 | Gamba Osaka | 4–5 (V-goal) (a.e.t.) | Yokohama Marinos | Expo '70 Commemorative Stadium |
| 15:00 JST (UTC+09) | Matsuyama 9'; Mladenović 50', 83'; Babunski 75' | J. League | Acosta 1' 117'; Bisconti 34', 57'; Omura 63' | Attendance: 7,874; Referee: Hiroshi Tanabe; Assistant referees: Satoru Kawano, Takayoshi Kashino; Fourth official: Tsuyoshi Miyake |

| 28 September 1996 21 | Júbilo Iwata | 1–0 | Yokohama Marinos | Júbilo Iwata Stadium |
| 14:00 JST (UTC+09) | Schillaci 89' | J. League | | Attendance: 14,688; Referee: Lim Kee Chong; Assistant referees: Kōji Taniuchi, Ichirō Inukai; Fourth official: Takuya Okada |

| 2 October 1996 22 | Yokohama Marinos | 0–1 | Urawa Red Diamonds | Yokohama Mitsuzawa Football Stadium |
| 19:04 JST (UTC+09) | | J. League | Buchwald 8' (pen.) | Attendance: 11,798; Referee: Bemard Saules; Assistant referees: Noboru Ishiyama, Akihisa Makino; Fourth official: Hiroshi Yashiro |

| 5 October 1996 23 | Nagoya Grampus Eight | 2–0 | Yokohama Marinos | Nagoya Mizuho Athletics Stadium |
| 19:33 JST (UTC+09) | Okayama 5'; Hirano 12' | J. League | | Attendance: 21,984; Referee: Masayoshi Okada; Assistant referees: Morihisa Yamaguchi, Yū Nakamura; Fourth official: Toshiya Narita |

| 16 October 1996 24 | Yokohama Marinos | 1–3 | Verdy Kawasaki | Tokyo National Stadium |
| 19:03 JST (UTC+09) | Acosta 43' | J. League | Magrão 22'; Bismarck 71'; K. Miura 80' | Attendance: 21,870; Referee: Leslie Mottram; Assistant referees: Hiroshi Fukuda, Tetsu Karakida; Fourth official: Keizō Yamazaki |

| 19 October 1996 25 | JEF United Ichihara | 1–2 | Yokohama Marinos | Tokyo National Stadium |
| 15:02 JST (UTC+09) | Jō 60' | J. League | T. Suzuki 59'; Yasunaga 82' | Attendance: 16,902; Referee: Keiichi Sunakawa; Assistant referees: Kazuaki Hamaguchi, Kenichi Koshiyama; Fourth official: Masao Yamanaka |

| 26 October 1996 26 | Yokohama Marinos | 0–1 | Kashima Antlers | Yamagata Park Stadium |
| 13:05 JST (UTC+09) | | J. League | Mazinho 87' | Attendance: 16,110; Referee: Naotsugu Fuse; Assistant referees: Mitsuru Satō, Satoru Ishizawa; Fourth official: Masaki Abe |

| 30 October 1996 27 | Cerezo Osaka | 1–0 | Yokohama Marinos | Osaka Nagai Stadium |
| 19:03 JST (UTC+09) | Yokoyama 84' | J. League | | Attendance: 8,573; Referee: Fumikazu Shioyazono; Assistant referees: Naoki Esumi, Naoyuki Mori; Fourth official: Tamotsu Ōnishi |

| 2 November 1996 28 | Yokohama Marinos | 1–2 | Yokohama Flügels | Yokohama Mitsuzawa Football Stadium |
| 15:04 JST (UTC+09) | Bisconti 56' | J. League | Maezono 40'; Sampaio 89' | Attendance: 12,016; Referee: Kenji Tanaka; Assistant referees: Morihisa Yamaguchi, Takao Onshi; Fourth official: Susumu Miyaho |

| 6 November 1996 29 | Shimizu S-Pulse | 0–2 | Yokohama Marinos | Nihondaira Sports Stadium |
| 19:03 JST (UTC+09) | | J. League | Acosta 10', 53' | Attendance: 10,898; Referee: Tatsumi Ōno; Assistant referees: Tetsu Karakida, Kōji Minami; Fourth official: Toshiyuki Asanuma |

| 9 November 1996 30 | Yokohama Marinos | 3–1 | Sanfrecce Hiroshima | Yokohama Mitsuzawa Football Stadium |
| 14:30 JST (UTC+09) | Omura 19', 50', 89' | J. League | 12' (o.g.) | Attendance: 10,858; Referee: Hiroyuki Umemoto; Assistant referees: Kazuaki Hamaguchi, Takuji Fukazawa; Fourth official: Masahiko Takahashi |

=== Emperor's Cup ===
| 1st Round | bye |

| 2nd Round | bye |

| 17 November 1996 3rd Round | Yokohama Marinos | 1–2 (V-goal) (a.e.t.) | Otsuka Pharmaceutical | Tecnoport Fukui Stadium |
| : JST (UTC+09) | Acosta 34' | | Furukawa 56'; Sekiguchi 98' |

=== J.League Cup ===
| 1 June 1996 GL-A-1-1 | Yokohama Marinos | 2–3 | Gamba Osaka | Yokohama Mitsuzawa Football Stadium |
| 16:00 JST (UTC+09) | Miura 56', 77' | J. League | Isogai 15', 52'; Gillhaus 18' | Attendance: 9,552; Referee: Naotsugu Fuse; Assistant referees: Hiroshi Fukuda, Hitoshi Nakagomi; Fourth official: Michio Nakahara |

| 5 June 1996 GL-A-1-2 | Gamba Osaka | 1–1 (4–3 agg.) | Yokohama Marinos | Expo '70 Commemorative Stadium |
| 19:00 JST (UTC+09) | Matsuyama 66' | J. League | T. Yamada 79' | Attendance: 7,114; Referee: Hideo Kikuchi; Assistant referees: Morihisa Yamaguchi, Hiroyuki Ōnishi; Fourth official: Tamotsu Ōnishi |

| 8 June 1996 GL-A-2-1 | Kashiwa Reysol | 0–0 | Yokohama Marinos | Hitachi Kashiwa Soccer Stadium |
| 18:31 JST (UTC+09) | | J. League | | Attendance: 12,768; Referee: Shinichirō Obata; Assistant referees: Hisaharu Kitamura, Ichirō Inukai; Fourth official: Eiji Kawai |

| 12 June 1996 GL-A-2-2 | Yokohama Marinos | 3–1 (3–1 agg.) | Kashiwa Reysol | Yokohama Mitsuzawa Football Stadium |
| 19:00 JST (UTC+09) | Miura 9'; Matsuda 44'; Bisconti 50' | J. League | Edílson 75' | Attendance: 8,280; Referee: Kenji Tanaka; Assistant referees: Tōru Yamashiro, Naoki Esumi; Fourth official: Kazuhiko Uchida |

| 15 June 1996 GL-A-3-1 | Bellmare Hiratsuka | 1–1 | Yokohama Marinos | Hiratsuka Stadium |
| 18:30 JST (UTC+09) | Nakata 66' | J. League | Bisconti 67' | Attendance: 10,451; Referee: Piotr Werner; Assistant referees: Toshiyuki Mayuzumi, Keiji Kamiara; Fourth official: Hiroshi Yamaguchi |

| 19 June 1996 GL-A-3-2 | Yokohama Marinos | 0–3 (1–4 agg.) | Bellmare Hiratsuka | Yokohama Mitsuzawa Football Stadium |
| 19:00 JST (UTC+09) | | J. League | T. Iwamoto 8'; Paulinho 53', 57' | Attendance: 8,717; Referee: Zoran Petrović; Assistant referees: Morihisa Yamaguchi, Ichirō Inukai; Fourth official: Kazuo Shirato |

| 22 June 1996 GL-A-4-1 | Yokohama Marinos | 2–0 | Urawa Red Diamonds | Yokohama Mitsuzawa Football Stadium |
| 15:01 JST (UTC+09) | Matsuda 14'; Zapata 16' | J. League | | Attendance: 13,476; Referee: Archundia; Assistant referees: Yū Nakamura, Takao Onshi; Fourth official: Kenji Ōgiya |

| 26 June 1996 GL-A-4-2 | Urawa Red Diamonds | 2–1 (2–3 agg.) | Yokohama Marinos | Urawa Komaba Stadium |
| 19:00 JST (UTC+09) | Okano 78'; Fukuda 89' | J. League | Bisconti 89' | Attendance: 18,914; Referee: Naotsugu Fuse; Assistant referees: Takashi Kunori, Hitoshi Nakagomi; Fourth official: Ichirō Kuwabara |

| 29 June 1996 GL-A-5-1 | Kyoto Purple Sanga | 1–3 | Yokohama Marinos | Toyama Stadium |
| 18:35 JST (UTC+09) | Raudnei 49' | J. League | Zapata 22'; Nagayama 75'; Omura 82' | Attendance: 10,726; Referee: Archundia; Assistant referees: Kōji Taniuchi, Masaaki Shimomura; Fourth official: Motohito Takeuchi |

| 3 July 1996 GL-A-5-2 | Yokohama Marinos | 0–1 (3–2 agg.) | Kyoto Purple Sanga | Yokohama Mitsuzawa Football Stadium |
| 19:04 JST (UTC+09) | | J. League | To. Yamaguchi 66' | Attendance: 8,159; Referee: Hideo Kikuchi; Assistant referees: Noboru Ishiyama, Hisaharu Kitamura; Fourth official: Ryū Tetsusashi |

| 10 August 1996 GL-A-6-1 | Júbilo Iwata | 0–2 | Yokohama Marinos | Júbilo Iwata Stadium |
| 19:00 JST (UTC+09) | | J. League | Omura 24', 39' | Attendance: 17,139; Referee: Masayoshi Okada; Assistant referees: Sōichirō Kaneko, Takao Onshi; Fourth official: Toshiaki Futamata |

| 14 August 1996 GL-A-6-2 | Yokohama Marinos | 2–0 (4–0 agg.) | Júbilo Iwata | Yokohama Mitsuzawa Football Stadium |
| 19:03 JST (UTC+09) | T. Suzuki 31'; Bisconti 89' | J. League | | Attendance: 13,125; Referee: Leslie Mottram; Assistant referees: Takashi Kunori, Takuji Fukazawa; Fourth official: Hiroshi Yamaguchi |

| 17 August 1996 GL-A-7-1 | Yokohama Marinos | 3–5 | Sanfrecce Hiroshima | Yokohama Mitsuzawa Football Stadium |
| 19:00 JST (UTC+09) | Omura 10'; T. Yamada 74'; Acosta 89' | J. League | Santos 16', 85'; Takagi 30'; Huistra 65'; Kubo 80' | Attendance: 10,407; Referee: Yoshimi Ogawa; Assistant referees: Toshimitsu Yoshida, Susumu Takeda; Fourth official: Mineo Takada |

| 21 August 1996 GL-A-7-2 | Sanfrecce Hiroshima | 2–2 (7–5 agg.) | Yokohama Marinos | Hiroshima Big Arch |
| 19:01 JST (UTC+09) | Huistra 44'; Moriyasu 51' | J. League | Acosta 18', 22' | Attendance: 8,250; Referee: Tōru Kamikawa; Assistant referees: Kazuya Yanagisawa, Hiroyuki Izumi; Fourth official: Kōji Hanaguchi |

=== Super Cup ===
| 9 March 1996 | Yokohama Marinos | 0–2 | Nagoya Grampus Eight | Tokyo National Stadium |
| 14:03 JST (UTC+09) | | J. League | Okayama 29'; Fukuda 39' | Attendance: 39,570; Referee: Yoshimi Ogawa; Assistant referees: Noboru Ishiyama, Yū Nakamura; Fourth official: Tōru Kamikawa |

=== Sanwa Bank Cup ===
| 4 March 1996 | Yokohama Marinos | 1–1 (3–5 p) | (Sweden) IFK Göteborg | Tokyo National Stadium |
| | Miura ?' | | Mikael Martinsson ?' | Attendance: 28,113 |

== International results ==
=== Asian Club Championship ===
| 1st Round | (Japan) Yokohama Marinos | withdrew | (Macau) Artilheiros |

| 12 September 1996 2nd Round-1 | (Japan) Yokohama Marinos | 2–0 | (Malaysia) Johor FC | Yokohama, Japan |
| | Bisconti ?'; Ueno ?' | | | Stadium: Yokohama Mitsuzawa Football Stadium; Attendance: 4,261 |

| 18 September 1996 2nd Round-2 | (Malaysia) Johor FC | 1–1 (1–3 agg.) | (Japan) Yokohama Marinos | Johor Bahru, Malaysia |
| | ? ?' | | Ueno ?' (pen.) | Stadium: Tan Sri Dato Hj Hassan Yunos Stadium; Attendance: 1,500 |

| 24 November 1996 Quarterfinals-1 | (South Korea) Pohang Steelers | 2–2 | (Japan) Yokohama Marinos | Daegu, Korea Rep. |
| | ? ?' ? ?' | | Acosta ?'; Miura ?' | Attendance: 27,800 |

| 26 November 1996 Quarterfinals-2 | (Japan) Yokohama Marinos | 2–3 | (South Korea) Ilhwa Chunma | Daegu, Korea Rep. |
| | Acosta ?'; Noda ?' | | ? ?' ? ?' ? ?' |

| 28 November 1996 Quarterfinals-3 | (Japan) Yokohama Marinos | 10–0 | (Maldives) New Radiant | Daegu, Korea Rep. |
| | M. Suzuki ?'; Acosta ?', ?', ?', ?', ?'; Terakawa ?', ?'; Ueno ?'; Hirama ?' |

== Player statistics ==
| Pos. | Nat. | Player | D.o.B. (Age) | Height / Weight | J.League | | Emperor's Cup | | J.League Cup | | Super Cup | | Sanwa Bank Cup | | Dom. Total | | Asian Club Championship | |
| Pos. | Nat. | Player | D.o.B. (Age) | Height / Weight | Apps | Goals | Apps | Goals | Apps | Goals | Apps | Goals | Apps | Goals | Apps | Goals | Apps | Goals |
|---|---|---|---|---|---|---|---|---|---|---|---|---|---|---|---|---|---|---|
| MF | (Argentina) | Gorosito | May 14, 1964 (aged 31) | 175 cm / 70 kg | 6 | 3 | 0 | 0 | 0 | 0 | 1 | 0 | 1 | 0 | 8 | 3 | | 0 |
| FW | (Argentina) | Acosta | August 23, 1966 (aged 29) | 176 cm / 79 kg | 21 | 10 | 1 | 1 | 12 | 3 | 1 | 0 | 1 | 0 | 36 | 14 | | 7 |
| DF | (Japan) | Masami Ihara | September 18, 1967 (aged 28) | 182 cm / 72 kg | 29 | 1 | 1 | 0 | 13 | 0 | 1 | 0 | 1 | 0 | 45 | 1 | | 0 |
| MF | (Argentina) | Zapata | October 15, 1967 (aged 28) | 175 cm / 78 kg | 26 | 0 | 1 | 0 | 11 | 2 | 1 | 0 | 1 | 0 | 40 | 2 | | 0 |
| MF | (Argentina) | Bisconti | September 22, 1968 (aged 27) | 178 cm / 75 kg | 21 | 7 | 0 | 0 | 13 | 4 | 0 | 0 | 0 | 0 | 34 | 11 | | 1 |
| MF | (Japan) | Satoru Noda | March 19, 1969 (aged 26) | 174 cm / 68 kg | 28 | 4 | 1 | 0 | 9 | 0 | 1 | 0 | 1 | 0 | 40 | 4 | | 1 |
| GK | (Japan) | Masahiko Nakagawa | August 26, 1969 (aged 26) | 180 cm / 72 kg | 16 | 0 | 1 | 0 | 1 | 0 | 1 | 0 | 1 | 0 | 20 | 0 | | 0 |
| DF | (Japan) | Norio Omura | September 6, 1969 (aged 26) | 180 cm / 75 kg | 24 | 5 | 1 | 0 | 14 | 4 | 1 | 0 | 1 | 0 | 41 | 9 | | 0 |
| MF | (Japan) | Masato Koga | May 22, 1970 (aged 25) | 170 cm / 60 kg | 2 | 0 | 0 | 0 | 3 | 0 | 0 | 0 | 0 | 0 | 5 | 0 | | 0 |
| DF | (Japan) | Masaharu Suzuki | August 3, 1970 (aged 25) | 168 cm / 63 kg | 27 | 0 | 1 | 0 | 4 | 0 | 1 | 0 | 1 | 0 | 34 | 0 | | 1 |
| MF | (Japan) | Fumitake Miura | August 12, 1970 (aged 25) | 174 cm / 70 kg | 23 | 2 | 1 | 0 | 13 | 3 | 1 | 0 | 1 | 1 | 39 | 6 | | 1 |
| DF | (Japan) | Kunio Nagayama | September 16, 1970 (aged 25) | 171 cm / 65 kg | 16 | 0 | 1 | 0 | 8 | 1 | 0 | 0 | 0 | 0 | 25 | 1 | | 0 |
| DF | (Japan) | Tetsuya Itō | October 1, 1970 (aged 25) | 178 cm / 69 kg | 1 | 0 | 0 | 0 | 0 | 0 | 0 | 0 | 0 | 0 | 1 | 0 | | 0 |
| DF | (Japan) | Takehito Suzuki | June 11, 1971 (aged 24) | 177 cm / 72 kg | 24 | 3 | 1 | 0 | 14 | 1 | 1 | 0 | 1 | 0 | 41 | 4 | | 0 |
| GK | (Japan) | Eiichirō Yamada | June 15, 1971 (aged 24) | 180 cm / 75 kg | 0 | 0 | | 0 | 0 | 0 | 0 | 0 | 0 | 0 | | 0 | | 0 |
| MF | (Japan) | Takahiro Yamada | April 29, 1972 (aged 23) | 174 cm / 70 kg | 23 | 1 | 0 | 0 | 9 | 2 | 1 | 0 | 1 | 0 | 34 | 3 | | 0 |
| MF | (Japan) | Yoshiharu Ueno | April 21, 1973 (aged 22) | 181 cm / 70 kg | 16 | 0 | 1 | 0 | 6 | 0 | 1 | 0 | 1 | 0 | 25 | 0 | | 3 |
| GK | (Japan) | Daijirō Takakuwa | August 10, 1973 (aged 22) | 190 cm / 80 kg | 0 | 0 | | 0 | 0 | 0 | 0 | 0 | 0 | 0 | | 0 | | 0 |
| MF | (Japan) | Yoshito Terakawa | September 6, 1974 (aged 21) | 174 cm / 62 kg | 6 | 0 | 0 | 0 | 1 | 0 | 0 | 0 | 0 | 0 | 7 | 0 | | 2 |
| MF | (Japan) | Mitsunobu Moriya | June 27, 1975 (aged 20) | 175 cm / 68 kg | 0 | 0 | | 0 | 0 | 0 | 0 | 0 | 0 | 0 | | 0 | | 0 |
| GK | (Japan) | Yoshikatsu Kawaguchi | August 15, 1975 (aged 20) | 181 cm / 75 kg | 15 | 0 | 0 | 0 | 13 | 0 | 0 | 0 | 0 | 0 | 28 | 0 | | 0 |
| MF | (Japan) | Akihiro Endō | September 18, 1975 (aged 20) | 172 cm / 65 kg | 2 | 1 | 0 | 0 | 4 | 0 | 0 | 0 | 0 | 0 | 6 | 1 | | 0 |
| DF | (Japan) | Kensaku Ōmori | November 21, 1975 (aged 20) | 177 cm / 69 kg | 3 | 0 | 0 | 0 | 5 | 0 | 1 | 0 | 0 | 0 | 9 | 0 | | 0 |
| DF | (Japan) | Yoshio Koido | April 19, 1976 (aged 19) | 182 cm / 71 kg | 0 | 0 | | 0 | 0 | 0 | 0 | 0 | 0 | 0 | | 0 | | 0 |
| FW | (Japan) | Sōtarō Yasunaga | April 20, 1976 (aged 19) | 178 cm / 68 kg | 11 | 1 | 1 | 0 | 6 | 0 | 0 | 0 | 0 | 0 | 18 | 1 | | 0 |
| MF | (Japan) | Shūsuke Shimada | July 10, 1976 (aged 19) | 176 cm / 63 kg | 0 | 0 | | 0 | 0 | 0 | 0 | 0 | 0 | 0 | | 0 | | 0 |
| DF | (Japan) | Ryūji Kubota | July 24, 1976 (aged 19) | 184 cm / 77 kg | 3 | 0 | 0 | 0 | 0 | 0 | 0 | 0 | 0 | 0 | 3 | 0 | | 0 |
| DF | (Japan) | Fumiyasu Hata | July 28, 1976 (aged 19) | 178 cm / 65 kg | 0 | 0 | | 0 | 0 | 0 | 0 | 0 | 0 | 0 | | 0 | | 0 |
| DF | (Japan) | Noriaki Tsutsui | August 15, 1976 (aged 19) | 170 cm / 63 kg | 0 | 0 | | 0 | 0 | 0 | 0 | 0 | 0 | 0 | | 0 | | 0 |
| GK | (Japan) | Takuya Itō | December 30, 1976 (aged 19) | 180 cm / 70 kg | 0 | 0 | | 0 | 0 | 0 | 0 | 0 | 0 | 0 | | 0 | | 0 |
| DF | (Japan) | Naoki Matsuda | March 14, 1977 (aged 19) | 180 cm / 70 kg | 16 | 0 | 1 | 0 | 11 | 2 | 0 | 0 | 0 | 0 | 28 | 2 | | 0 |
| MF | (Japan) | Satoshi Kusayanagi | April 30, 1977 (aged 18) | 168 cm / 68 kg | 0 | 0 | | 0 | 0 | 0 | 0 | 0 | 0 | 0 | | 0 | | 0 |
| DF | (Japan) | Masatoshi Tanaka | April 5, 1977 (aged 18) | 178 cm / 68 kg | 0 | 0 | | 0 | 0 | 0 | 0 | 0 | 0 | 0 | | 0 | | 0 |
| MF | (Japan) | Naoto Muramatsu | May 4, 1977 (aged 18) | 181 cm / 74 kg | 0 | 0 | | 0 | 0 | 0 | 0 | 0 | 0 | 0 | | 0 | | 0 |
| DF | (Japan) | Masayuki Miyazawa | June 5, 1977 (aged 18) | 166 cm / 62 kg | 0 | 0 | | 0 | 0 | 0 | 0 | 0 | 0 | 0 | | 0 | | 0 |
| FW | (Japan) | Yosuke Fukase | June 5, 1977 (aged 18) | 181 cm / 68 kg | 0 | 0 | | 0 | 0 | 0 | 0 | 0 | 0 | 0 | | 0 | | 0 |
| MF | (Japan) | Tomokazu Hirama | June 30, 1977 (aged 18) | 172 cm / 61 kg | 5 | 0 | 0 | 0 | 0 | 0 | 0 | 0 | 0 | 0 | 5 | 0 | | 1 |
| FW | (Japan) | Masahiro Fukazawa | July 12, 1977 (aged 18) | 175 cm / 63 kg | 0 | 0 | | 0 | 0 | 0 | 0 | 0 | 0 | 0 | | 0 | | 0 |
| DF | (Japan) | Kei Mikuriya | August 29, 1977 (aged 18) | 171 cm / 64 kg | 12 | 1 | 0 | 0 | 7 | 0 | 0 | 0 | 0 | 0 | 19 | 1 | | 0 |
| FW | (Japan) | Hideki Matsuki | September 5, 1977 (aged 18) | 178 cm / 72 kg | 0 | 0 | | 0 | 0 | 0 | 0 | 0 | 0 | 0 | | 0 | | 0 |
| MF | (Japan) | Takayuki Nakamaru † | May 28, 1977 (aged 18) | -cm / -kg | 0 | 0 | | 0 | 0 | 0 | 0 | 0 | 0 | 0 | | 0 | | 0 |
| MF | (Argentina) | Figueroa † | February 13, 1978 (aged 18) | 178 cm / 71 kg | 1 | 0 | 0 | 0 | 0 | 0 | 0 | 0 | 0 | 0 | 1 | 0 | | 0 |

- † player(s) joined the team after the opening of this season.

== Transfers ==
In:

| No. | Pos. | Nation | Player |
|---|---|---|---|
| — | DF | JPN | Masatoshi Tanaka (from Yokohama Marinos youth) |
| — | DF | JPN | Masayuki Miyazawa (from Yokohama Marinos youth) |
| — | DF | JPN | Kei Mikuriya (from Narashino High School) |
| — | MF | ARG | Néstor Raúl Gorosito (from Universidad Católica) |
| — | MF | JPN | Satoshi Kusayanagi (from Yokohama Marinos youth) |
| — | MF | JPN | Naoto Muramatsu (from Narashino High School) |
| — | MF | JPN | Tomokazu Hirama (from Tohoku High School) |
| — | FW | JPN | Yosuke Fukase (from Nara Koryo High School) |
| — | FW | JPN | Masahiro Fukazawa (from Shizuoka Gakuen Senior High School) |
| — | FW | JPN | Hideki Matsuki (from Yokohama Marinos youth) |

Out:

| No. | Pos. | Nation | Player |
|---|---|---|---|
| — | MF | JPN | Keiichi Zaizen (to Toshiba) |
| — | MF | JPN | Rikizō Matsuhashi (to Kyoto Purple Sanga) |
| — | MF | JPN | Shinya Nishikawa |
| — | MF | JPN | Shinji Makino |
| — | MF | ARG | Massacessi (to Atlante) |
| — | FW | ARG | Medina Bello (to River Plate) |
| — | FW | JPN | Takuya Jinno (to Vissel Kobe) |

== Transfers during the season ==
=== In ===
- (Japan) Takayuki Nakamaru (from River Plate)
- (Argentina) Darío Damián Figueroa (on September)

=== Out ===
- (Argentina) Gorosito (on August)
- (Japan) Masahiro Fukazawa (loan to River Plate on August)

== Awards ==
- J.League Best XI: (Japan) Masami Ihara

== Other pages ==
- (in Japanese) J. League official site
- (in Japanese) Yokohama F. Marinos official site
