= Ryuji Kubota =

Japanese footballer

Ryuji Kubota 窪田 龍二
Personal information
- Full name: Ryuji Kubota
- Date of birth: July 24, 1976 (age 50)
- Place of birth: Hyogo, Japan
- Height: 1.85 m (6 ft 1 in)
- Position: Midfielder

Youth career
- 1992–1994: Kobe Koryo Gakuen High School

Senior career*
Years	Team	Apps	(Gls)
1995–1997	Yokohama Marinos	11	(0)
1998	Vissel Kobe	20	(0)
Total		31	(0)
Medal record
Yokohama Marinos
Winner	J1 League	1995
- * Club domestic league appearances and goals

Ryuji Kubota (窪田 龍二, Kubota Ryuji; born July 24, 1976) is a former Japanese football player.

== Playing career ==
Kubota was born in Hyogo Prefecture on July 24, 1976. After graduating from high school, he joined the Yokohama Marinos in 1995. He played as defensive midfielder and center back. On March 18, he debuted against Kashima Antlers in the opening match of the 1995 season. However he did not play much after that. He did not play at all in the match in 1997 and he moved to Vissel Kobe in 1998. Although he played many matches as defensive midfielder, he retired at the end of the 1998 season.

== Career statistics ==
Appearances and goals by club, season and competition
Club	Season	League			Emperor's Cup		J.League Cup		Total	
Club	Season	Division	Apps	Goals	Apps	Goals	Apps	Goals	Apps	Goals
Yokohama Marinos	1995	J1 League	8	0	1	0	—		9	0
Yokohama Marinos	1996	J1 League	3	0	0	0	0	0	3	0
Yokohama Marinos	1997	J1 League	0	0	0	0	0	0	0	0
Vissel Kobe	1998	J1 League	20	0			4	0	24	0
Career total			31	0	1	0	4	0	36	0
