= 1995 Yokohama Marinos season =

Yokohama Marinos
1995 season
- Manager: Jorge Solari; Hiroshi Hayano (from 19 June 1995)
- Stadium: Yokohama Mitsuzawa Football Stadium
- J.League: Champions
- Emperor's Cup: 2nd Round
- Top goalscorer: League: Bisconti (27); All: Bisconti (28)
- Highest home attendance: 14,127 (vs Kashima Antlers, 22 July 1995); 52,699 (vs Verdy Kawasaki, 16 August 1995, Tokyo National Stadium)
- Lowest home attendance: 10,331 (vs Cerezo Osaka, 18 October 1995)
- Average home league attendance: 18,326
| Home colours | Away colours |

1995 Yokohama Marinos season

== Review and events ==
Yokohama Marinos won J.League Suntory series (first stage).

=== League results summary ===
| Overall | | | | | | | | Home | | | | | | Away | | | | | |
| Pld | W | D | L | GF | GA | GD | Pts | W | D | L | GF | GA | GD | W | D | L | GF | GA | GD |
|---|---|---|---|---|---|---|---|---|---|---|---|---|---|---|---|---|---|---|---|
| 52 | 32 | 0 | 20 | 86 | 75 | +11 | 98 | 19 | 0 | 7 | 48 | 27 | +21 | 13 | 0 | 13 | 38 | 48 | −10 |

Source: J.LEAGUE OFFICIAL RECORD & DATA 1996. ISBN 4-09-102323-1.

=== League results by round ===
J.League Suntory series (first stage)
| Round | 1 | 2 | 3 | 4 | 5 | 6 | 7 | 8 | 9 | 10 | 11 | 12 | 13 | 14 | 15 | 16 | 17 | 18 | 19 | 20 | 21 | 22 | 23 | 24 | 25 | 26 |
|---|---|---|---|---|---|---|---|---|---|---|---|---|---|---|---|---|---|---|---|---|---|---|---|---|---|---|
| Ground | A | H | A | H | A | A | H | H | A | A | H | A | H | A | H | A | H | H | A | A | H | H | A | H | A | H |
| Result | W | W | W | W | L | W | W | L | W | L | W | W | W | W | L | L | W | W | L | L | L | W | W | W | L | W |
| Position | 2 | 1 | 1 | 1 | 3 | 1 | 1 | 3 | 2 | 3 | 2 | 2 | 1 | 2 | 1 | 1 | 1 | 1 | 1 | 1 | 1 | 1 | 1 | 1 | 1 | 1 |

Source: J.LEAGUE OFFICIAL RECORD & DATA 1996. ISBN 4-09-102323-1.
A = Away; H = Home; W = Win; D = Draw; L = Loss

J.League NICOS series (second stage)
| Round | 1 | 2 | 3 | 4 | 5 | 6 | 7 | 8 | 9 | 10 | 11 | 12 | 13 | 14 | 15 | 16 | 17 | 18 | 19 | 20 | 21 | 22 | 23 | 24 | 25 | 26 |
|---|---|---|---|---|---|---|---|---|---|---|---|---|---|---|---|---|---|---|---|---|---|---|---|---|---|---|
| Ground | A | H | A | H | A | H | A | A | H | A | H | A | H | A | H | A | H | A | H | H | A | H | A | H | A | H |
| Result | W | L | L | L | W | L | W | W | W | W | W | W | W | L | W | L | W | L | W | W | L | W | L | L | L | W |
| Position | 4 | 5 | 9 | 11 | 9 | 9 | 8 | 8 | 6 | 6 | 4 | 4 | 3 | 4 | 4 | 4 | 4 | 4 | 4 | 4 | 4 | 3 | 3 | 4 | 4 | 3 |

Source: J.LEAGUE OFFICIAL RECORD & DATA 1996. ISBN 4-09-102323-1.
A = Away; H = Home; W = Win; D = Draw; L = Loss

== Competitions ==
| Competitions | Position |
|---|---|
| J.League | Champions / 14 clubs |
| Emperor's Cup | 2nd round |

== Domestic results ==
=== J.League ===
| 18 March 1995 1st-1 | Kashima Antlers | 3–4 (V-goal) (a.e.t.) | Yokohama Marinos | Kashima Soccer Stadium |
| 15:04 JST (UTC+09) | Leonardo 17', 65' (pen.); Hasegawa 80' | J. League | Medina Bello 0', 87'; Bisconti 36'; Omura 96' | Attendance: 15,584; Referee: Yoshimi Ogawa; Assistant referees: Masato Nogami, Kenichi Koshiyama; Fourth official: Takao Onshi; Man of the Match: Norio Omura |

| 22 March 1995 1st-2 | Yokohama Marinos | 6–2 | Verdy Kawasaki | Yokohama Mitsuzawa Football Stadium |
| 19:03 JST (UTC+09) | Noda 5'; Miura 21'; Bisconti 25', 82' (pen.); 38' (o.g.); T. Yamada 72' | J. League | Fujiyoshi 52'; Hashiratani 62' | Attendance: 13,033; Referee: Shinichirō Obata; Assistant referees: Sōichirō Kaneko, Hiroshi Tanabe; Fourth official: Michio Nakahara; Man of the Match: Medina Bello |

| 25 March 1995 1st-3 | Yokohama Flügels | 0–1 | Yokohama Marinos | Tokyo National Stadium |
| 15:03 JST (UTC+09) | | J. League | Bisconti 12' | Attendance: 36,039; Referee: Juan Carlos Crespi; Assistant referees: Takashi Kunori, Kazuhisa Osada; Fourth official: Hide Lii; Man of the Match: Bisconti |

| 29 March 1995 1st-4 | Yokohama Marinos | 3–2 (V-goal) (a.e.t.) | JEF United Ichihara | Yokohama Mitsuzawa Football Stadium |
| 19:03 JST (UTC+09) | T. Yamada 24'; M. Suzuki 78'; T. Suzuki 119' | J. League | Rufer 82', 84' | Attendance: 11,978; Referee: Hideo Kikuchi; Assistant referees: Kazuaki Hamaguchi, Takayoshi Kashino; Fourth official: Takatoshi Itō; Man of the Match: Takehito Suzuki |

| 1 April 1995 1st-5 | Gamba Osaka | 4–0 | Yokohama Marinos | Expo '70 Commemorative Stadium |
| 15:00 JST (UTC+09) | Kondō 22', 26'; Y. Matsuyama 54'; Protassov 64' | J. League | | Attendance: 17,749; Referee: Masayoshi Okada; Assistant referees: Sōichirō Kaneko, Naoyuki Mori; Fourth official: Tsuyoshi Miyake |

| 5 April 1995 1st-6 | Júbilo Iwata | 1–2 | Yokohama Marinos | Júbilo Iwata Stadium |
| 19:02 JST (UTC+09) | Schillaci 29' | J. League | Miura 53'; Omura 84' | Attendance: 17,813; Referee: Kenji Tanaka; Assistant referees: Kazuo Kakihana, Mikio Fukuoka; Fourth official: Toshiaki Futamata; Man of the Match: Takehito Suzuki |

| 8 April 1995 1st-7 | Yokohama Marinos | 2–0 | Nagoya Grampus Eight | Yokohama Mitsuzawa Football Stadium |
| 15:00 JST (UTC+09) | T. Yamada 9', 58' | J. League | | Attendance: 13,254; Referee: Naotsugu Fuse; Assistant referees: Mitsuru Satō, Satoru Ishizawa; Fourth official: Hiroshi Yamaguchi; Man of the Match: Takahiro Yamada |

| 12 April 1995 1st-8 | Yokohama Marinos | 2–3 (V-goal) (a.e.t.) | Urawa Red Diamonds | Tokyo National Stadium |
| 19:02 JST (UTC+09) | M. Suzuki 44'; Díaz 66' | J. League | Rummenigge 0'; Bein 68' (pen.) 104' | Attendance: 48,710; Referee: Armando Perez; Assistant referees: Yū Nakamura, Tōru Kamikawa; Fourth official: Keizō Yamazaki |

| 15 April 1995 1st-9 | Bellmare Hiratsuka | 0–2 | Yokohama Marinos | Tokyo National Stadium |
| 19:03 JST (UTC+09) | | J. League | Koizumi 49'; Koga 87' | Attendance: 44,152; Referee: Kiyoshi Ōta; Assistant referees: Kazuaki Hamaguchi, Akihisa Makino; Fourth official: Masao Yamanaka; Man of the Match: Masaharu Suzuki |

| 22 April 1995 1st-10 | Cerezo Osaka | 4–0 | Yokohama Marinos | Osaka Nagai No.2 Stadium |
| 15:04 JST (UTC+09) | Valdés 5', 14', 60'; Kanda 58' | J. League | | Attendance: 12,393; Referee: Kenji Tanaka; Assistant referees: Yasuhiro Hemmi, Tōru Kamikawa; Fourth official: Sōichirō Kaneko |

| 26 April 1995 1st-11 | Yokohama Marinos | 1–0 | Kashiwa Reysol | Tokyo National Stadium |
| 19:01 JST (UTC+09) | Medina Bello 26' | J. League | | Attendance: 51,725; Referee: Hiroyuki Umemoto; Assistant referees: Kazuaki Hamaguchi, Hisaharu Kitamura; Fourth official: Yoshikazu Ozaki; Man of the Match: Medina Bello |

| 29 April 1995 1st-12 | Sanfrecce Hiroshima | 0–1 | Yokohama Marinos | Oita Athletic Stadium |
| 17:01 JST (UTC+09) | | J. League | Jinno 89' | Attendance: 10,237; Referee: Masayoshi Okada; Assistant referees: Hideaki Harada, Tōru Yamashiro; Fourth official: Tsunenori Nagamatsu; Man of the Match: Masami Ihara |

| 3 May 1995 1st-13 | Yokohama Marinos | 2–0 | Shimizu S-Pulse | Yokohama Mitsuzawa Football Stadium |
| 15:03 JST (UTC+09) | Ihara 21'; Bisconti 51' | J. League | | Attendance: 13,897; Referee: Shinichirō Obata; Assistant referees: Yasuhiro Matsuzaki, Sōichirō Kaneko; Fourth official: Sakae Ikeda; Man of the Match: Takahiro Yamada |

| 6 May 1995 1st-14 | Verdy Kawasaki | 2–3 | Yokohama Marinos | Kawasaki Todoroki Stadium |
| 19:04 JST (UTC+09) | Takeda 20'; Pereira 69' (pen.) | J. League | Medina Bello 2'; T. Yamada 56'; Miura 59' | Attendance: 14,789; Referee: Armando Perez; Assistant referees: Masato Nogami, Toshiyuki Mayuzumi; Fourth official: Takao Oura; Man of the Match: Zapata |

| 10 May 1995 1st-15 | Yokohama Marinos | 0–0 (V-goal) (a.e.t.) (4–5 p) | Yokohama Flügels | Yokohama Mitsuzawa Football Stadium |
| 19:03 JST (UTC+09) | | J. League | | Attendance: 13,817; Referee: Lutz Fröhlich; Assistant referees: Toshimitsu Yoshida, Kō Ōishi; Fourth official: Yoshiharu Nakamura |
| | Penalties |
| | (penalty scored) Bisconti; (penalty scored) Terakawa; (penalty missed) Zapata; (penalty scored) T. Suzuki; (penalty scored) Noda | | (penalty scored) Zinho; (penalty scored) Maezono; (penalty scored) Harada; (penalty scored) Watanabe; (penalty scored) Yamaguchi |

| 13 May 1995 1st-16 | JEF United Ichihara | 2–1 | Yokohama Marinos | Akita Yabase Stadium |
| 13:04 JST (UTC+09) | Jō 10'; Ejiri 75' | J. League | Bisconti 40' | Attendance: 15,807; Referee: Kiyoshi Ōta; Assistant referees: Hitoshi Yamada, Satoru Ishizawa; Fourth official: Atsushi Endō |

| 17 June 1995 1st-17 | Yokohama Marinos | 3–1 | Gamba Osaka | Yokohama Mitsuzawa Football Stadium |
| 19:03 JST (UTC+09) | Jinno 50'; Medina Bello 73', 89' | J. League | Gillhaus 86' | Attendance: 13,145; Referee: Juan Carlos Crespi; Assistant referees: Kazuaki Hamaguchi, Toshiyuki Mayuzumi; Fourth official: Kazuhiko Uchida; Man of the Match: Yoshikatsu Kawaguchi |

| 21 June 1995 1st-18 | Yokohama Marinos | 3–2 | Júbilo Iwata | Yokohama Mitsuzawa Football Stadium |
| 19:00 JST (UTC+09) | Bisconti 52', 78'; Omura 57' | J. League | Fujita 37'; Endō 87' | Attendance: 13,505; Referee: Masayoshi Okada; Assistant referees: Hiroshi Fukuda, Takayoshi Kashino; Fourth official: Kazuo Shirato; Man of the Match: Bisconti |

| 24 June 1995 1st-19 | Nagoya Grampus Eight | 3–2 | Yokohama Marinos | Gifu Nagaragawa Stadium |
| 19:03 JST (UTC+09) | Durix 39'; Okayama 53'; Yonekura 77' | J. League | T. Suzuki 55'; T. Yamada 63' | Attendance: 24,071; Referee: Hiroyuki Umemoto; Assistant referees: Sōichirō Kaneko, Satoru Kawano; Fourth official: Takahiko Sugiyama |

| 28 June 1995 1st-20 | Urawa Red Diamonds | 2–1 (V-goal) (a.e.t.) | Yokohama Marinos | Omiya Football Stadium |
| 19:02 JST (UTC+09) | Bein 67'; Hirose 99' | J. League | Medina Bello 51' | Attendance: 9,924; Referee: Lutz Fröhlich; Assistant referees: Peter Augar, Olaf Blumenstein; Fourth official: Izumi Okada |

| 1 July 1995 1st-21 | Yokohama Marinos | 0–3 | Bellmare Hiratsuka | Yokohama Mitsuzawa Football Stadium |
| 19:00 JST (UTC+09) | | J. League | 69' (o.g.); Noguchi 72'; Betinho 81' (pen.) | Attendance: 12,767; Referee: Naotsugu Fuse; Assistant referees: Takashi Kunori, Tetsu Karakida; Fourth official: Michio Nakahara |

| 8 July 1995 1st-22 | Yokohama Marinos | 1–0 | Cerezo Osaka | Yokohama Mitsuzawa Football Stadium |
| 19:00 JST (UTC+09) | Bisconti 49' | J. League | | Attendance: 11,469; Referee: Hideo Kikuchi; Assistant referees: Noboru Ishiyama, Akihisa Makino; Fourth official: Hisahito Okano; Man of the Match: Takuya Itō |

| 12 July 1995 1st-23 | Kashiwa Reysol | 2–2 (V-goal) (a.e.t.) (5–6 p) | Yokohama Marinos | Kashiwa Hitachi Stadium |
| 19:03 JST (UTC+09) | Tanada 0'; N. Katō 89' (pen.) | J. League | Medina Bello 21'; Noda 80' | Attendance: 11,597; Referee: Tetsuya Hamana; Assistant referees: Hiroshi Fukuda, Toshimitsu Yoshida; Fourth official: Kaoru Nagase; Man of the Match: Medina Bello |
| | Penalties |
| | (penalty scored) Careca; (penalty scored) Nelsinho; (penalty scored) Sawada; (penalty scored) Ōkuma; (penalty scored) N. Katō; (penalty missed) Sugano | | (penalty scored) Bisconti; (penalty scored) T. Suzuki; (penalty scored) Omura; (penalty scored) Ihara; (penalty scored) Noda; (penalty scored) Medina Bello |

| 15 July 1995 1st-24 | Yokohama Marinos | 3–0 | Sanfrecce Hiroshima | Sapporo Atsubetsu Stadium |
| 15:00 JST (UTC+09) | Bisconti 24' (pen.), 78'; Medina Bello 73' | J. League | | Attendance: 14,905; Referee: Juan Carlos Crespi; Assistant referees: Kenichi Koshiyama, Tetsu Karakida; Fourth official: Yutaka Furukawa; Man of the Match: Norio Omura |

| 19 July 1995 1st-25 | Shimizu S-Pulse | 2–1 | Yokohama Marinos | Nihondaira Sports Stadium |
| 19:06 JST (UTC+09) | Mukōjima 3'; Sawanobori 23' | J. League | Omura 84' | Attendance: 21,047; Referee: Tatsumi Ōno; Assistant referees: Yasuhiro Hemmi, Yasushi Tsuchimoto; Fourth official: Masakazu Hōjō |

| 22 July 1995 1st-26 | Yokohama Marinos | 1–0 | Kashima Antlers | Yokohama Mitsuzawa Football Stadium |
| 19:03 JST (UTC+09) | Medina Bello 12' | J. League | | Attendance: 14,127; Referee: Masayoshi Okada; Assistant referees: Yasuhiro Matsuzaki, Takayoshi Kashino; Fourth official: Junichi Sasaki; Man of the Match: Masami Ihara |

| 12 August 1995 2nd-1 | Kashima Antlers | 0–2 | Yokohama Marinos | Kashima Soccer Stadium |
| 19:02 JST (UTC+09) | | J. League | T. Suzuki 68'; Medina Bello 73' | Attendance: 16,162; Referee: Zoran Petrović; Assistant referees: Hiroshi Fukuda, Toshimitsu Yoshida; Fourth official: Wakao Namatame; Man of the Match: Takehito Suzuki |

| 16 August 1995 2nd-2 | Yokohama Marinos | 0–1 | Verdy Kawasaki | Tokyo National Stadium |
| 19:03 JST (UTC+09) | | J. League | Alcindo 33' | Attendance: 52,699; Referee: Naotsugu Fuse; Assistant referees: Yoshikazu Hiroshima, Hiroshi Tanabe; Fourth official: Masao Yamanaka |

| 19 August 1995 2nd-3 | Yokohama Flügels | 2–1 (V-goal) (a.e.t.) | Yokohama Marinos | Yokohama Mitsuzawa Football Stadium |
| 19:04 JST (UTC+09) | Maezono 89'; Zinho 105' | J. League | Bisconti 64' | Attendance: 14,104; Referee: Keiichi Sunakawa; Assistant referees: Masahiro Katagiri, Satoru Kawano; Fourth official: Yoshio Itō |

| 23 August 1995 2nd-4 | Yokohama Marinos | 0–1 | Shimizu S-Pulse | Yokohama Mitsuzawa Football Stadium |
| 19:03 JST (UTC+09) | | J. League | Dias 46' (pen.) | Attendance: 12,764; Referee: Fumikazu Shioyazono; Assistant referees: Masato Nogami, Ichirō Inukai; Fourth official: Mitsune Yamaguchi |

| 26 August 1995 2nd-5 | Cerezo Osaka | 0–2 | Yokohama Marinos | Osaka Nagai No.2 Stadium |
| 19:00 JST (UTC+09) | | J. League | Jinno 62'; Medina Bello 83' | Attendance: 12,848; Referee: Shinichirō Obata; Assistant referees: Kazuya Yanagisawa, Yasushi Tsuchimoto; Fourth official: Kazuo Kakihana; Man of the Match: Yoshikatsu Kawaguchi |

| 2 September 1995 2nd-6 | Yokohama Marinos | 2–3 | Kashiwa Reysol | Yokohama Mitsuzawa Football Stadium |
| 19:00 JST (UTC+09) | Bisconti 5', 73' | J. League | Hashiratani 28'; Careca 57'; Tanada 82' | Attendance: 12,123; Referee: Naotsugu Fuse; Assistant referees: Masahiro Katagiri, Kimio Izaki; Fourth official: Haruo Imai |

| 6 September 1995 2nd-7 | Sanfrecce Hiroshima | 0–0 (V-goal) (a.e.t.) (1–4 p) | Yokohama Marinos | Hiroshima Stadium |
| 19:03 JST (UTC+09) | | J. League | | Attendance: 8,171; Referee: Alfredo Trentalange; Assistant referees: Tōru Kamikawa, Hiroyuki Izumi; Fourth official: Kazuyuki Tanimoto; Man of the Match: Yoshikatsu Kawaguchi |
| | Penalties |
| | (penalty scored) Kazama; (penalty missed) Hašek; (penalty missed) Yanagimoto | | (penalty scored) Bisconti; (penalty scored) Tetsuya Itō; (penalty scored) Omura; (penalty scored) Ihara |

| 9 September 1995 2nd-8 | Bellmare Hiratsuka | 2–3 (V-goal) (a.e.t.) | Yokohama Marinos | Hiratsuka Stadium |
| 19:04 JST (UTC+09) | Ōmoto 13'; Betinho 20' (pen.) | J. League | Bisconti 49' (pen.), 55'; M. Suzuki 95' | Attendance: 15,118; Referee: Keiichi Sunakawa; Assistant referees: Takeshi Ōkura, Akihisa Makino; Fourth official: Michio Nakahara; Man of the Match: Masaharu Suzuki |

| 13 September 1995 2nd-9 | Yokohama Marinos | 3–1 | Urawa Red Diamonds | Yokohama Mitsuzawa Football Stadium |
| 19:03 JST (UTC+09) | Bisconti 68', 77'; Medina Bello 74' | J. League | Toninho 38' | Attendance: 13,205; Referee: Zoran Petrović; Assistant referees: Hitoshi Yamada, Takayoshi Kashino; Fourth official: Kazuhiko Uchida; Man of the Match: Satoru Noda |

| 16 September 1995 2nd-10 | Gamba Osaka | 1–2 | Yokohama Marinos | Expo '70 Commemorative Stadium |
| 19:05 JST (UTC+09) | Isogai 28' | J. League | T. Yamada 39'; 41' (o.g.) | Attendance: 15,639; Referee: Masayoshi Okada; Assistant referees: Yasuhiro Hemmi, Akio Okutani; Fourth official: Kazuo Kakihana; Man of the Match: Zapata |

| 23 September 1995 2nd-11 | Yokohama Marinos | 2–1 | Júbilo Iwata | Tokyo National Stadium |
| 15:03 JST (UTC+09) | M. Suzuki 23'; Bisconti 71' (pen.) | J. League | Schillaci 62' | Attendance: 45,741; Referee: Kiyoshi Ōta; Assistant referees: Kazuaki Hamaguchi, Hisaharu Kitamura; Fourth official: Masao Yamanaka; Man of the Match: Masaharu Suzuki |

| 27 September 1995 2nd-12 | JEF United Ichihara | 1–2 | Yokohama Marinos | Tokyo National Stadium |
| 19:03 JST (UTC+09) | Y. Gotō 62' | J. League | Medina Bello 21', 73' | Attendance: 28,802; Referee: Yoshimi Ogawa; Assistant referees: Hiroshi Fukuda, Satoru Ishizawa; Fourth official: Noritake Sakurada; Man of the Match: Medina Bello |

| 30 September 1995 2nd-13 | Yokohama Marinos | 5–0 | Nagoya Grampus Eight | Yokohama Mitsuzawa Football Stadium |
| 15:03 JST (UTC+09) | Matsuda 3'; Bisconti 9', 61'; Medina Bello 10', 63' | J. League | | Attendance: 12,591; Referee: Armando Perez; Assistant referees: Hiroshi Fukuda, Kō Ōishi; Fourth official: Toshiya Kumagai; Man of the Match: Naoki Matsuda |

| 4 October 1995 2nd-14 | Verdy Kawasaki | 4–1 | Yokohama Marinos | Kawasaki Todoroki Stadium |
| 19:04 JST (UTC+09) | T. Kikuchi 39'; Miura 76' (pen.), 81'; Alcindo 86' | J. League | Medina Bello 18' | Attendance: 18,245; Referee: Kenji Tanaka; Assistant referees: Noboru Ishiyama, Takashi Kunori; Fourth official: Michio Nakahara |

| 7 October 1995 2nd-15 | Yokohama Marinos | 1–0 | Yokohama Flügels | Yokohama Mitsuzawa Football Stadium |
| 15:03 JST (UTC+09) | Medina Bello 77' | J. League | | Attendance: 12,249; Referee: Yoshimi Ogawa; Assistant referees: Yū Nakamura, Kenichi Koshiyama; Fourth official: Masaki Yoshihara; Man of the Match: Medina Bello |

| 14 October 1995 2nd-16 | Shimizu S-Pulse | 3–1 | Yokohama Marinos | Nihondaira Sports Stadium |
| 16:03 JST (UTC+09) | Marco 24'; Sawanobori 30', 38' | J. League | Omura 87' | Attendance: 19,943; Referee: Kazuo Kakihana; Assistant referees: Morihisa Yamaguchi, Kazuhisa Osada; Fourth official: Toshiyuki Asanuma |

| 18 October 1995 2nd-17 | Yokohama Marinos | 0–0 (V-goal) (a.e.t.) (4–3 p) | Cerezo Osaka | Yokohama Mitsuzawa Football Stadium |
| 19:04 JST (UTC+09) | | J. League | | Attendance: 10,331; Referee: Keiichi Sunakawa; Assistant referees: Sōichirō Kaneko, Hisaharu Kitamura; Fourth official: Tasuku Onodera; Man of the Match: Yoshikatsu Kawaguchi |
| | Penalties |
| | (penalty missed) Bisconti; (penalty scored) Omura; (penalty missed) Massacessi; (penalty scored) Ihara; (penalty scored) Noda; (penalty missed) Zapata; (penalty scored) M. Suzuki | | (penalty missed) Kudaka; (penalty missed) Kanda; (penalty scored) Murata; (penalty scored) Fukagawa; (penalty scored) Tsukamoto; (penalty missed) Gilmar; (penalty missed) Bernardo |

| 21 October 1995 2nd-18 | Kashiwa Reysol | 4–2 | Yokohama Marinos | Tokyo National Stadium |
| 15:04 JST (UTC+09) | Valdir 3'; Careca 18', 61'; Nelsinho 52' | J. League | Bisconti 22'; Yasunaga 58' | Attendance: 29,523; Referee: Hideo Kikuchi; Assistant referees: Takeshi Ōkura, Tetsu Karakida; Fourth official: Noritake Sakurada |

| 1 November 1995 2nd-19 | Yokohama Marinos | 2–1 | Sanfrecce Hiroshima | Yokohama Mitsuzawa Football Stadium |
| 19:04 JST (UTC+09) | Bisconti 61'; Medina Bello 71' | J. League | Noh 67' | Attendance: 10,638; Referee: Zoran Petrović; Assistant referees: Noboru Ishiyama, Ichirō Inukai; Fourth official: Hiroshi Yamauchi; Man of the Match: Kensaku Omori |

| 4 November 1995 2nd-20 | Yokohama Marinos | 2–1 | Bellmare Hiratsuka | Yokohama Mitsuzawa Football Stadium |
| 15:00 JST (UTC+09) | Zapata 19'; Bisconti 78' | J. League | Betinho 33' (pen.) | Attendance: 12,074; Referee: Hiroyuki Umemoto; Assistant referees: Yū Nakamura, Mitsuyoshi Nakaguma; Fourth official: Masahiko Takahashi; Man of the Match: Zapata |

| 8 November 1995 2nd-21 | Urawa Red Diamonds | 2–2 (V-goal) (a.e.t.) (5–4 p) | Yokohama Marinos | Urawa Komaba Stadium |
| 19:05 JST (UTC+09) | Sugiyama 43'; Bein 69' | J. League | Medina Bello 37'; Bisconti 89' | Attendance: 19,455; Referee: Fumikazu Shioyazono; Assistant referees: Yasushi Tsuchimoto, Hisaharu Kitamura; Fourth official: Izumi Okada |
| | Penalties |
| | (penalty scored) Fukuda; (penalty scored) Hirose; (penalty scored) Toninho; (penalty scored) Yamada; (penalty scored) Bein | | (penalty scored) Bisconti; (penalty scored) Medina Bello; (penalty scored) M. Suzuki; (penalty scored) Ihara; (penalty missed) Noda |

| 11 November 1995 2nd-22 | Yokohama Marinos | 0–0 (V-goal) (a.e.t.) (3–1 p) | Gamba Osaka | Yokohama Mitsuzawa Football Stadium |
| 15:00 JST (UTC+09) | | J. League | | Attendance: 11,851; Referee: Keiichi Sunakawa; Assistant referees: Takashi Kunori, Mikio Fukuoka; Fourth official: Kenji Ōgiya; Man of the Match: Masami Ihara |
| | Penalties |
| | (penalty missed) Bisconti; (penalty scored) Matsuhashi; (penalty scored) M. Suzuki; (penalty scored) Medina Bello | | (penalty missed) Škrinjar; (penalty missed) Tsveiba; (penalty scored) Y. Matsuyama; (penalty missed) Saneyoshi |

| 15 November 1995 2nd-23 | Júbilo Iwata | 3–0 | Yokohama Marinos | Júbilo Iwata Stadium |
| 19:01 JST (UTC+09) | Fujita 45'; Ōyama 73'; Kudō 89' | J. League | | Attendance: 14,552; Referee: Hiroyuki Umemoto; Assistant referees: Tetsu Karakida, Takuji Fukazawa; Fourth official: Tōru Nagata |

| 18 November 1995 2nd-24 | Yokohama Marinos | 1–5 | JEF United Ichihara | Yokohama Mitsuzawa Football Stadium |
| 15:03 JST (UTC+09) | Ueno 33' | J. League | Y. Gotō 51'; Maslovar 54', 85'; Akiba 63'; Jō 89' | Attendance: 11,926; Referee: Zoran Petrović; Assistant referees: Kimio Izaki, Takuji Fukazawa; Fourth official: Takeshi Ōgiya |

| 22 November 1995 2nd-25 | Nagoya Grampus Eight | 1–0 | Yokohama Marinos | Nagoya Mizuho Athletics Stadium |
| 19:02 JST (UTC+09) | Moriyama 71' | J. League | | Attendance: 22,092; Referee: Kazuo Kakihana; Assistant referees: Sōichirō Kaneko, Kōji Minami; Fourth official: Motoyoshi Matsumoto |

| 25 November 1995 2nd-26 | Yokohama Marinos | 3–0 | Kashima Antlers | Yokohama Mitsuzawa Football Stadium |
| 15:02 JST (UTC+09) | Ueno 20'; Bisconti 46', 84' (pen.) | J. League | | Attendance: 11,939; Referee: Jamal Al-Sharif; Assistant referees: Kazuaki Hamaguchi, Naoki Esumi; Fourth official: Mitsune Yamaguchi; Man of the Match: Yoshiharu Ueno |

==== J.League Championship ====
| 30 November 1995 1 | Yokohama Marinos | 1–0 | Verdy Kawasaki | Tokyo National Stadium |
| 19:05 JST (UTC+09) | Bisconti 48' | J. League | | Attendance: 47,631; Referee: Zoran Petrović; Assistant referees: Yasuhiro Matsuzaki, Noboru Ishiyama; Fourth official: Keiichi Sunakawa |

| 6 December 1995 2 | Verdy Kawasaki | 0–1 (0–2 agg.) | Yokohama Marinos | Tokyo National Stadium |
| 19:05 JST (UTC+09) | | J. League | Ihara 29' | Attendance: 48,271; Referee: Shinichirō Obata; Assistant referees: Yoshikazu Hiroshima, Hiroshi Fukuda; Fourth official: Yoshimi Ogawa |

=== Emperor's Cup ===
| 3 December 1995 1st Round | Yokohama Marinos | 3–2 | Honda | Yokohama Mitsuzawa Football Stadium |
| : JST (UTC+09) | Miura 64'; Omura 68'; T. Suzuki 80' | | 7' (o.g.); Igawa 88' | Attendance: 11,192 |

| 10 December 1995 2nd Round | Yokohama Marinos | 0–1 | Fukuoka Blux | Kumamoto Athletics Stadium |
| : JST (UTC+09) | | | A. Nagai 10' | Attendance: 6,243 |

== Player statistics ==
| No. | Pos | Nat | Player | Total | | J-League | | J. Championship | | Emperor's Cup | |
| No. | Pos | Nat | Player | Apps | Goals | Apps | Goals | Apps | Goals | Apps | Goals |
|---|---|---|---|---|---|---|---|---|---|---|---|
| | GK | (Japan) JPN | Shigetatsu Matsunaga | 10 | 0 | 10 | 0 | 0 | 0 | 0 | 0 |
| | GK | (Japan) JPN | Eiichirō Yamada | 0 | 0 | 0 | 0 | 0 | 0 | 0 | 0 |
| | GK | (Japan) JPN | Daijirō Takakuwa | 0 | 0 | 0 | 0 | 0 | 0 | 0 | 0 |
| | GK | (Japan) JPN | Yoshikatsu Kawaguchi | 45 | 0 | 41 | 0 | 2 | 0 | 2 | 0 |
| | GK | (Japan) JPN | Takuya Itō | 2 | 0 | 2 | 0 | 0 | 0 | 0 | 0 |
| | DF | (Japan) JPN | Masami Ihara | 51 | 2 | 47 | 1 | 2 | 1 | 2 | 0 |
| | DF | (Japan) JPN | Junji Koizumi | 3 | 1 | 3 | 1 | 0 | 0 | 0 | 0 |
| | DF | (Japan) JPN | Norio Omura | 47 | 6 | 43 | 5 | 2 | 0 | 2 | 1 |
| | DF | (Japan) JPN | Masaharu Suzuki | 54 | 4 | 50 | 4 | 2 | 0 | 2 | 0 |
| | DF | (Japan) JPN | Kunio Nagayama | 0 | 0 | 0 | 0 | 0 | 0 | 0 | 0 |
| | DF | (Japan) JPN | Tetsuya Itō | 7 | 0 | 7 | 0 | 0 | 0 | 0 | 0 |
| | DF | (Japan) JPN | Takehito Suzuki | 30 | 4 | 27 | 3 | 1 | 0 | 2 | 1 |
| | DF | (Japan) JPN | Kensaku Ōmori | 10 | 0 | 9 | 0 | 0 | 0 | 1 | 0 |
| | DF | (Japan) JPN | Yoshio Koido | 0 | 0 | 0 | 0 | 0 | 0 | 0 | 0 |
| | DF | (Japan) JPN | Fumiyasu Hata | 0 | 0 | 0 | 0 | 0 | 0 | 0 | 0 |
| | DF | (Japan) JPN | Noriaki Tsutsui | 0 | 0 | 0 | 0 | 0 | 0 | 0 | 0 |
| | DF | (Japan) JPN | Naoki Matsuda | 36 | 1 | 33 | 1 | 2 | 0 | 1 | 0 |
| | MF | (Japan) JPN | Takashi Mizunuma | 1 | 0 | 1 | 0 | 0 | 0 | 0 | 0 |
| | MF | (Argentina) ARG | Gustavo Zapata | 48 | 1 | 46 | 1 | 2 | 0 | 0 | 0 |
| | MF | (Japan) JPN | Keiichi Zaizen | 0 | 0 | 0 | 0 | 0 | 0 | 0 | 0 |
| | MF | (Japan) JPN | Rikizō Matsuhashi | 7 | 0 | 6 | 0 | 0 | 0 | 1 | 0 |
| | MF | (Argentina) ARG | David Bisconti | 50 | 28 | 48 | 27 | 2 | 1 | 0 | 0 |
| | MF | (Japan) JPN | Satoru Noda | 54 | 2 | 50 | 2 | 2 | 0 | 2 | 0 |
| | MF | (Japan) JPN | Fumitake Miura | 20 | 4 | 16 | 3 | 2 | 0 | 2 | 1 |
| | MF | (Japan) JPN | Takahiro Yamada | 46 | 7 | 43 | 7 | 2 | 0 | 1 | 0 |
| | MF | (Japan) JPN | Yoshiharu Ueno | 7 | 2 | 5 | 2 | 0 | 0 | 2 | 0 |
| | MF | (Japan) JPN | Shinya Nishikawa | 1 | 0 | 1 | 0 | 0 | 0 | 0 | 0 |
| | MF | (Japan) JPN | Yoshito Terakawa | 19 | 0 | 19 | 0 | 0 | 0 | 0 | 0 |
| | MF | (Japan) JPN | Mitsunobu Moriya | 0 | 0 | 0 | 0 | 0 | 0 | 0 | 0 |
| | MF | (Japan) JPN | Akihiro Endō | 22 | 0 | 19 | 0 | 2 | 0 | 1 | 0 |
| | MF | (Japan) JPN | Shinji Makino | 0 | 0 | 0 | 0 | 0 | 0 | 0 | 0 |
| | MF | (Japan) JPN | Shūsuke Shimada | 1 | 0 | 1 | 0 | 0 | 0 | 0 | 0 |
| | MF | (Japan) JPN | Ryūji Kubota | 9 | 0 | 8 | 0 | 0 | 0 | 1 | 0 |
| | FW | (Argentina) ARG | Ramón Díaz | 6 | 1 | 6 | 1 | 0 | 0 | 0 | 0 |
| | FW | (Argentina) ARG | Medina Bello | 41 | 21 | 40 | 21 | 1 | 0 | 0 | 0 |
| | FW | (Japan) JPN | Masato Koga | 27 | 1 | 25 | 1 | 0 | 0 | 2 | 0 |
| | FW | (Japan) JPN | Takuya Jinno | 40 | 3 | 39 | 3 | 0 | 0 | 1 | 0 |
| | FW | (Japan) JPN | Sōtarō Yasunaga | 31 | 1 | 28 | 1 | 1 | 0 | 2 | 0 |
| | MF | (Japan) JPN | Massacessi † | 7 | 0 | 7 | 0 | 0 | 0 | 0 | 0 |
| | GK | (Japan) JPN | Masahiko Nakagawa † | 0 | 0 | 0 | 0 | 0 | 0 | 0 | 0 |

- † player(s) joined the team after the opening of this season.

== Transfers ==
In:

| No. | Pos. | Nation | Player |
|---|---|---|---|
| — | GK | JPN | Eiichirō Yamada (from Fujieda Blux) |
| — | GK | JPN | Takuya Itō (from Yokohama Marinos youth) |
| — | DF | JPN | Yoshio Koido (from Maebashi Commercial High School) |
| — | DF | JPN | Fumiyasu Hata (from Yokohama Marinos youth) |
| — | DF | JPN | Noriaki Tsutsui (from Yokohama Marinos youth) |
| — | DF | JPN | Naoki Matsuda (from Maebashi Ikuei High School) |
| — | MF | JPN | Keiichi Zaizen (from Kashiwa Reysol) |
| — | MF | JPN | Shinji Makino (from Tokai University Daigo Senior High school) |
| — | MF | JPN | Shūsuke Shimada (from Yokohama Marinos youth) |
| — | MF | JPN | Ryūji Kubota (from Kobe Koryo Gakuen High School) |
| — | FW | JPN | Sōtarō Yasunaga (from Shimizu Commercial High School) |

Out:

| No. | Pos. | Nation | Player |
|---|---|---|---|
| — | GK | JPN | Izumi Yokokawa |
| — | GK | JPN | Takeshi Urakami (to Shimizu S-Pulse) |
| — | DF | JPN | Hiroshi Hirakawa (to Yokohama Flügels) |
| — | DF | JPN | Hiroaki Kimura |
| — | DF | JPN | Satoshi Horiuchi |
| — | MF | JPN | Kazushi Kimura (retired) |
| — | MF | JPN | Kazuto Saiki (to Ventforet Kofu) |
| — | MF | JPN | Masahiro Katō |
| — | MF | JPN | Junichirō Murashige |
| — | MF | JPN | Nobuhisa Isono (to Prima Ham FC Tsuchiura) |
| — | FW | JPN | Satoru Yoshida (to Otsuka Pharmaceutical) |

== Transfers during the season ==
=== In ===
- (Argentina) Pedro Fernando Massacessi (from Pumas on April)
- (Japan) Masahiko Nakagawa (from Yokohama Flügels)

=== Out ===
- (Japan) Junji Koizumi (to Yokohama Flügels)
- (Argentina) Ramón Díaz (on May)
- (Japan) Takashi Mizunuma (retired)
- (Japan) Shigetatsu Matsunaga (to Tosu Futures)

== Awards ==
- J.League Rookie of the Year: (Japan) Yoshikatsu Kawaguchi
- J.League Best XI: (Japan) Masami Ihara, (Japan) Masaharu Suzuki

== Other pages ==
- (in Japanese) J. League official site
- (in Japanese) Yokohama F. Marinos official site
