= Takehito Suzuki =

Japanese footballer

Takehito Suzuki 鈴木 健仁
Personal information
- Full name: Takehito Suzuki
- Date of birth: June 11, 1971 (age 55)
- Place of birth: Machida, Tokyo, Japan
- Height: 1.77 m (5 ft 9 1/2 in)
- Position: Defender

Youth career
- 1987–1989: Nihon University Fujisawa High School

Senior career*
Years	Team	Apps	(Gls)
1990–1998	Yokohama Marinos	110	(8)
1998–1999	Kyoto Purple Sanga	37	(1)
2000	Gamba Osaka	12	(0)
2001–2002	Vissel Kobe	21	(2)
2002–2003	Vegalta Sendai	15	(0)
Total		195	(11)
Medal record
Yokohama Marinos
Runner-up	Japan Soccer League	1990/91
Runner-up	Japan Soccer League	1991/92
Winner	J1 League	1995
Winner	JSL Cup	1990
Winner	Emperor's Cup	1991
Winner	Emperor's Cup	1992
Runner-up	Emperor's Cup	1990
- * Club domestic league appearances and goals

Takehito Suzuki (鈴木 健仁, Suzuki Takehito; born June 11, 1971) is a former Japanese football player. He is currently the General Manager at JEF United Chiba.

== Playing career ==
Suzuki was born in Machida on June 11, 1971. After graduating from high school, he joined Nissan Motors (later Yokohama Marinos) in 1990. Through reserve team, he joined top team in 1992. He debuted in 1993 and he played many matches in 1994. He mainly played as right side back and right side midfielder. The club won the champions 1995 J1 League. However his opportunity to play decreased in 1998 and he moved to Kyoto Purple Sanga in October 1998. He played as regular player until 1999. In 2000, he moved to Gamba Osaka. In 2001, he moved to Vissel Kobe and played many matches. However he lost his opportunity to play in 2002 and moved to newly was promoted to J1 League club, Vegalta Sendai in June 2002. He retired at the end of the 2003 season.

== Career statistics ==
Appearances and goals by club, season and competition
Club	Season	League			Emperor's Cup		J.League Cup		Total	
Club	Season	Division	Apps	Goals	Apps	Goals	Apps	Goals	Apps	Goals
Yokohama Marinos	1992	J1 League	—		0	0	0	0	0	0
Yokohama Marinos	1993	J1 League	2	0	0	0	5	0	7	0
Yokohama Marinos	1994	J1 League	22	1	4	0	3	0	29	1
Yokohama Marinos	1995	J1 League	27	3	2	1	—		29	4
Yokohama Marinos	1996	J1 League	24	3	1	0	14	1	39	4
Yokohama Marinos	1997	J1 League	22	1	0	0	0	0	22	1
Yokohama Marinos	1998	J1 League	13	0	0	0	4	0	17	0
Kyoto Purple Sanga	1998	J1 League	8	1	2	0	0	0	10	1
Kyoto Purple Sanga	1999	J1 League	29	0	2	0	4	0	35	0
Gamba Osaka	2000	J1 League	12	0	4	0	2	0	18	0
Vissel Kobe	2001	J1 League	21	2	1	0	4	0	26	2
Vissel Kobe	2002	J1 League	0	0	0	0	0	0	0	0
Vegalta Sendai	2002	J1 League	15	0	0	0	0	0	15	0
Vegalta Sendai	2003	J1 League	0	0	0	0	0	0	0	0
Career total			195	11	16	1	36	1	247	13
