= Norio Omura =

Japanese footballer and manager

Norio Omura 小村 徳男
Personal information
- Date of birth: September 6, 1969 (age 57)
- Place of birth: Matsue, Shimane, Japan
- Height: 1.81 m (5 ft 11 in)
- Position: Defender

Youth career
- 1985–1987: Matsue Minami High School

College career
| Years | Team | Apps | (Gls) |
| 1988–1991 | Juntendo University | | |

Senior career*
| Years | Team | Apps | (Gls) |
| 1992–2001 | Yokohama F. Marinos | 248 | (22) |
| 2002–2003 | Vegalta Sendai | 48 | (4) |
| 2004–2006 | Sanfrecce Hiroshima | 67 | (3) |
| 2006–2007 | Yokohama FC | 33 | (1) |
| 2008 | Gainare Tottori | 17 | (0) |
| Total | | 413 | (30) |

International career
| 1995–1998 | Japan | 30 | (4) |

Managerial career
- 2013: Gainare Tottori
Medal record
Yokohama F. Marinos
| Winner | J1 League | 1995 |
| Runner-up | J1 League | 2000 |
| Winner | J.League Cup | 2001 |
| Winner | Emperor's Cup | 1992 |
- * Club domestic league appearances and goals

Norio Omura (小村 徳男, Omura Norio; born September 6, 1969) is a Japanese former football player and manager. He played for the Japan national team from 1995 to 1998.

== Club career ==
Omura was born in Matsue, Japan on September 6, 1969. After graduating from Juntendo University, he joined Yokohama Marinos (later Yokohama F. Marinos) in 1992. In the 1990s, he played center-back with Japan national team player Masami Ihara. The club won the champions 1992 Emperor's Cup. In Asia, the club won the 1992–93 Asian Cup Winners' Cup and in 1995 the J1 League. In 2000s, the club won second place at the 2000 J1 League and the champions at the 2001 J.League Cup. He moved to Vegalta Sendai in 2002 and Sanfrecce Hiroshima in 2004. In 2006, his opportunity to play decreased and he moved to J2 League club Yokohama FC in August 2006. In 2008, he moved to Japan Football League club Gainare Tottori. He retired end of 2008 season.

== International career ==
On May 21, 1995, Omura debuted for the Japan national team against Scotland. In 1996, he became a regular player and played center-back with club teammate Masami Ihara. He also played each of Japan's matches at the 1996 Asian Cup. In 1997, although he played at 1998 World Cup qualification, his opportunity to play decreased. In 1998, he played for Japan at the 1998 World Cup. He played in one game against Jamaica instead of Eisuke Nakanishi for suspension. This match was his last game for Japan. He played 30 games and scored four goals for Japan until 1998.

== Coaching career ==
In 2013, Omura became a manager for Gainare Tottori. However the club performed poorly that year. He was sacked in August 2013, when Gainare was in 20th place of 22 clubs.

== Career statistics ==
=== Club ===
Appearances and goals by club, season and competition
| Club | Season | League | | | Emperor's Cup | | J.League Cup | | Total | |
| Club | Season | Division | Apps | Goals | Apps | Goals | Apps | Goals | Apps | Goals |
|---|---|---|---|---|---|---|---|---|---|---|
| Yokohama F. Marinos (Note: "Yokohama Marinos" until 1999) | 1992 | J1 League | – | | 4 | 1 | 1 | 1 | 5 | 2 |
| Yokohama F. Marinos | 1993 | J1 League | 29 | 0 | 3 | 0 | 3 | 0 | 35 | 0 |
| Yokohama F. Marinos | 1994 | J1 League | 33 | 3 | 4 | 1 | 3 | 2 | 40 | 6 |
| Yokohama F. Marinos | 1995 | J1 League | 43 | 5 | 2 | 1 | – | | 45 | 6 |
| Yokohama F. Marinos | 1996 | J1 League | 24 | 5 | 1 | 0 | 14 | 4 | 39 | 9 |
| Yokohama F. Marinos | 1997 | J1 League | 9 | 0 | 2 | 0 | 0 | 0 | 11 | 0 |
| Yokohama F. Marinos | 1998 | J1 League | 32 | 3 | 1 | 0 | 0 | 0 | 33 | 3 |
| Yokohama F. Marinos | 1999 | J1 League | 27 | 3 | 3 | 0 | 6 | 0 | 36 | 3 |
| Yokohama F. Marinos | 2000 | J1 League | 30 | 2 | 3 | 2 | 6 | 2 | 39 | 6 |
| Yokohama F. Marinos | 2001 | J1 League | 21 | 1 | 0 | 0 | 5 | 0 | 26 | 1 |
| Vegalta Sendai | 2002 | J1 League | 28 | 4 | 2 | 0 | 5 | 0 | 35 | 4 |
| Vegalta Sendai | 2003 | J1 League | 20 | 0 | 1 | 0 | 5 | 0 | 26 | 0 |
| Sanfrecce Hiroshima | 2004 | J1 League | 25 | 3 | 1 | 0 | 5 | 1 | 31 | 4 |
| Sanfrecce Hiroshima | 2005 | J1 League | 33 | 0 | 2 | 0 | 5 | 0 | 40 | 0 |
| Sanfrecce Hiroshima | 2006 | J1 League | 9 | 0 | 0 | 0 | 1 | 0 | 10 | 0 |
| Yokohama FC | 2006 | J2 League | 15 | 1 | 0 | 0 | – | | 15 | 1 |
| Yokohama FC | 2007 | J1 League | 18 | 0 | 2 | 0 | 1 | 0 | 21 | 0 |
| Gainare Tottori | 2008 | Football League | 17 | 0 | 0 | 0 | – | | 17 | 0 |
| Career total | | | 413 | 30 | 31 | 5 | 60 | 10 | 504 | 45 |

=== International ===
Appearances and goals by national team and year
| National team | Year | Apps | Goals |
|---|---|---|---|
| Japan | 1995 | 4 | 0 |
| Japan | 1996 | 12 | 2 |
| Japan | 1997 | 10 | 2 |
| Japan | 1998 | 4 | 0 |
| Total | | 30 | 4 |

Scores and results list Japan's goal tally first, score column indicates score after each Omura goal.

List of international goals scored by Norio Omura
| No. | Date | Venue | Opponent | Score | Result | Competition |
|---|---|---|---|---|---|---|
| 1 | 19 February 1996 | Hong Kong Stadium, Wan Chai, Hong Kong | Poland | | 5–0 | 1996 Carlsberg Cup |
| 2 | 22 February 1996 | Hong Kong Stadium, Wan Chai, Hong Kong | Sweden | | 1–1 | 1996 Carlsberg Cup |
| 3 | 23 March 1997 | Sultan Qaboos Sports Complex, Muscat, Oman | Oman | | 1–0 | 1998 FIFA World Cup qualification |
| 4 | 27 March 1997 | Sultan Qaboos Sports Complex, Muscat, Oman | Nepal | | 6–0 | 1998 FIFA World Cup qualification |

== Managerial statistics ==
| Team | From | To | Record | | | | |
| Team | From | To | G | W | D | L | Win % |
|---|---|---|---|---|---|---|---|
| Gainare Tottori | 2013 | 2013 | 28 | 5 | 11 | 12 | 17.86 |
| Total | | | 28 | 5 | 11 | 12 | 17.86 |

== Honours ==
J - League: 1995

Emperor's Cup: 2001

J - League Cup: 2001

Asian Cup Winner's Cup: 1992, 1993
