= Kei Mikuriya =

Japanese footballer

Kei Mikuriya 御厨 景
Personal information
- Full name: Kei Mikuriya
- Date of birth: August 29, 1977 (age 49)
- Place of birth: Chiba, Japan
- Height: 1.71 m (5 ft 7 1/2 in)
- Position: Defender

Youth career
- 1993–1995: Narashino High School

Senior career*
Years	Team	Apps	(Gls)
1996–1997	Yokohama Marinos	12	(1)
1998–2000	Vegalta Sendai	56	(0)
Total		68	(1)

International career
1997	Japan U-20	2	(0)
- * Club domestic league appearances and goals

Kei Mikuriya (御厨 景, Mikuriya Kei; born August 29, 1977) is a former Japanese football player.

== Club career ==
Mikuriya was born in Chiba Prefecture on August 29, 1977. After graduating from high school, he joined Yokohama Marinos in 1996. Although he played as right side midfielder from first season, he lost his opportunity to play in 1997. In 1998, he moved to Brummell Sendai (later Vegalta Sendai). He played many matches as left side back. In 2000, his opportunity to play decreased and he retired at the end of the 2000 season.

== National team career ==
In June 1997, Mikuriya was selected Japan U-20 national team for 1997 World Youth Championship. At this tournament, he played 2 matches as right side midfielder.

== Career statistics ==
Appearances and goals by club, season and competition
Club	Season	League			Emperor's Cup		J.League Cup		Total	
Club	Season	Division	Apps	Goals	Apps	Goals	Apps	Goals	Apps	Goals
Yokohama Marinos	1996	J1 League	12	1	0	0	7	0	19	1
Yokohama Marinos	1997	J1 League	0	0	0	0	0	0	0	0
Brummell Sendai	1998	Football League	24	0	3	0	3	0	30	0
Vegalta Sendai	1999	J2 League	28	0	2	0	2	0	32	0
Vegalta Sendai	2000	J2 League	4	0	0	0	0	0	4	0
Career total			68	1	5	0	12	0	85	1
