= Noriaki Tsutsui =

Japanese footballer

Noriaki Tsutsui 筒井 紀章
Personal information
- Full name: Noriaki Tsutsui
- Date of birth: August 15, 1976 (age 50)
- Place of birth: Yokohama, Japan
- Height: 1.72 m (5 ft 7 1/2 in)
- Position: Midfielder

Youth career
- 1992–1994: Yokohama Marinos

Senior career*
Years	Team	Apps	(Gls)
1995–1996	Yokohama Marinos	0	(0)
1997–1998	Otsuka Pharmaceutical	50	(2)
1999	Albirex Niigata	20	(0)
2000–2007	Tokushima Vortis	141	(8)
Total		211	(10)
Medal record
Yokohama Marinos
Winner	J1 League	1995
- * Club domestic league appearances and goals

Noriaki Tsutsui (筒井 紀章, Tsutsui Noriaki; born August 15, 1976) is a former Japanese football player.

== Playing career ==
Tsutsui was born in Yokohama on August 15, 1976. He joined his local club Yokohama Marinos from youth team in 1995. However he could not play at all in the match until 1996. In 1997, he moved to Japan Football League club Otsuka Pharmaceutical (later Tokushima Vortis). He played as regular player in 2 seasons. In 1999, he moved to newly was promoted to J2 League club, Albirex Niigata. He played many matches as defensive midfielder. In 2000, he moved to Otsuka Pharmaceutical again and he played as regular player. The club won the champions for 2 years in a row (2003-2004) and was promoted to J2 from 2005. Although he played many matches in 2005, he could hardly play in the match from 2006 and retired end of 2007 season.

== Club statistics ==
Club performance			League		Cup		League Cup		Total	
Season	Club	League	Apps	Goals	Apps	Goals	Apps	Goals	Apps	Goals
Japan			League		Emperor's Cup		League Cup		Total	
1995	Yokohama Marinos	J1 League	0	0	0	0	-		0	0
1996	Yokohama Marinos	J1 League	0	0	0	0	0	0	0	0
1997	Otsuka Pharmaceutical	Football League	27	1	2	0	-		29	1
1998	Otsuka Pharmaceutical	Football League	23	1	3	0	-		26	1
1999	Albirex Niigata	J2 League	20	0	1	0	2	0	23	0
2000	Otsuka Pharmaceutical	Football League	11	0	3	0	-		14	0
2001	Otsuka Pharmaceutical	Football League	28	4	3	0	-		31	4
2002	Otsuka Pharmaceutical	Football League	16	0	3	0	-		19	0
2003	Otsuka Pharmaceutical	Football League	27	1	3	0	-		30	1
2004	Otsuka Pharmaceutical	Football League	29	2	1	0	-		30	2
2005	Tokushima Vortis	J2 League	27	1	0	0	-		27	1
2006	Tokushima Vortis	J2 League	1	0	0	0	-		1	0
2007	Tokushima Vortis	J2 League	2	0	0	0	-		2	0
Career total			211	10	19	0	2	0	232	10
