= Masami Ihara =

Japanese football manager (born 1967)

Masami Ihara 井原 正巳
Personal information
- Date of birth: September 18, 1967 (age 59)
- Place of birth: Koka, Shiga, Japan
- Height: 1.82 m (6 ft 0 in)
- Position: Defender

Youth career
- 1983–1985: Moriyama High School

College career
Years	Team	Apps	(Gls)
1986–1989	University of Tsukuba		

Senior career*
Years	Team	Apps	(Gls)
1990–1999	Yokohama F. Marinos	267	(5)
2000	Júbilo Iwata	20	(1)
2001–2002	Urawa Reds	54	(1)
Total		341	(7)

International career
1988–1999	Japan	122	(5)

Managerial career
- 2006–2008: Japan U-23 (assistant)
- 2009–2014: Kashiwa Reysol (assistant)
- 2015–2018: Avispa Fukuoka
- 2019–2023: Kashiwa Reysol (assistant)
- 2023–2024: Kashiwa Reysol
Medal record
Nissan Motors / Yokohama Marinos / Yokohama F. Marinos
Runner-up	Japan Soccer League	1990/91
Runner-up	Japan Soccer League	1991/92
Winner	J1 League	1995
Winner	JSL Cup	1990
Winner	Emperor's Cup	1991
Winner	Emperor's Cup	1992
Runner-up	Emperor's Cup	1990
Urawa Reds
Runner-up	J.League Cup	2002
Representing Japan
AFC Asian Cup
Gold medal – first place	1992 Japan
- * Club domestic league appearances and goals

Masami Ihara (井原 正巳, Ihara Masami; born September 18, 1967) is a Japanese former footballer and manager. He was most recently the manager of J1 League club Kashiwa Reysol.

A defender, Ihara was captain of the Japan national team for more than a decade in the 1990s, together with striker Kazuyoshi Miura and Brazilian-born midfielder Ruy Ramos. Ihara's long standing record of 122 national team appearances was surpassed by Yasuhito Endo on October 16, 2012.

== Club career ==
Ihara was rarely out of the spotlight in the emerging J1 League throughout the 1990s. After graduating from University of Tsukuba, he joined Nissan Motors (later Yokohama Marinos) and rapidly rose through the Marinos youth ranks to become a key player. The long-serving Ihara was so important to his club that he was nicknamed Mister Marinos by many Japanese fans. He formed the backbone of the club and also helped to bring on talented youngsters like Yoshikatsu Kawaguchi and Shunsuke Nakamura.

After leaving Marinos, Ihara also spent a season with Júbilo Iwata (2000) and his last two seasons with Urawa Reds (2001–2002). He retired in 2002. He played 341 games and scored 7 goals in the league. He was selected Best Eleven for six years in a row (1991–92 to 1997). He also was selected as part of the 30th Anniversary J.League Best Eleven.

== International career ==
On January 27, 1988, when Ihara was a University of Tsukuba student, he debuted for Japan national team against United Arab Emirates. After his debut, he became a regular player playing the 1990 FIFA World Cup qualification and at the 1990 Asian Games. In 1992, Japan won the AFC Asian Cup for the first time. However, at 1994 FIFA World Cup qualification, Japan failed to won for qualify to 1994 FIFA World Cup. After that, Ihara became a captain for Japan and played at 1995 King Fahd Cup and 1996 AFC Asian Cup. In 1997, at 1998 World Cup qualification, Japan achieved qualification for the 1998 FIFA World Cup for the first time. During the 1998 World Cup in France, the veteran sweeper's experience was crucial to Japan's survival in their first World Cup appearance, forming a flat back three defence with strong centre-back Yutaka Akita as well as speedy fullbacks Eisuke Nakanishi (or strong centre-back Norio Omura). Young Marinos goalkeeper, Yoshikatsu Kawaguchi was Japan's first choice goalkeeper at the time. After 1998 World Cup, he played at 1999 Copa América. This competition was his last game for Japan. He played 122 games and scored 5 goals for Japan until 1999.

== Coaching career ==
In 2006, Ihara became the assistant coach for the Japan U-23 national team and spent two years.

He then became the assistant coach for club Kashiwa Reysol in 2009, being the caretaker on two occasions.

After a horrible three years of being at the bottom half of the table in the J2 League, Avispa Fukuoka then hired Ihara as their coach, replacing the former Marijan Pušnik. Under Ihara, then club went on to win 24 games out of 42 and collected a total of 82 points, ending their regular season in third place. Avispa then went on to the playoffs, where they beat V-Varen Nagasaki 1–0, and then drew 1–1 against Cerezo Osaka. Avispa eventually ended up getting promoted to the J1 League as they were the higher-seeded team.

Ihara's first match in charge of Avispa in the 2016 J1 League was a 2–1 away loss against Sagan Tosu. The first win in the league was on their eighth match in a 1–0 away win in Tokyo against FC Tokyo. He resigned at the end of the 2018 season.

== Career statistics ==
=== Club ===
Appearances and goals by club, season and competition
Club	Season	League			Emperor's Cup		J.League Cup		Total	
Club	Season	Division	Apps	Goals	Apps	Goals	Apps	Goals	Apps	Goals
Yokohama F. Marinos (Note: "Nissan Motors" until 1992, "Yokohama Marinos" until 1999)	1990–91	JSL Division 1	22	2			4	0	26	2
Yokohama F. Marinos	1991–92	JSL Division 1	22	0			3	0	25	0
Yokohama F. Marinos	1992	J1 League	—		5	0	8	0	13	0
Yokohama F. Marinos	1993	J1 League	32	0	1	0	0	0	33	0
Yokohama F. Marinos	1994	J1 League	41	1	4	0	2	0	47	1
Yokohama F. Marinos	1995	J1 League	47	1	2	0	—		49	1
Yokohama F. Marinos	1996	J1 League	29	1	1	0	13	0	43	1
Yokohama F. Marinos	1997	J1 League	22	0	2	0	0	0	24	0
Yokohama F. Marinos	1998	J1 League	27	0	1	0	0	0	28	0
Yokohama F. Marinos	1999	J1 League	25	0	3	0	6	0	34	0
Yokohama F. Marinos	Total		267	5	19	0	36	0	322	5
Júbilo Iwata	2000	J1 League	20	1	0	0	3	0	23	1
Urawa Reds	2001	J1 League	26	1	4	0	6	0	36	1
Urawa Reds	2002	J1 League	28	0	0	0	9	1	37	1
Urawa Reds	Total		54	1	4	0	15	1	73	2
Career total			341	7	23	0	54	1	418	8

=== International ===
Appearances and goals by national team and year
National team	Year	Apps	Goals
Japan	1988	5	0
Japan	1989	11	0
Japan	1990	6	0
Japan	1991	2	0
Japan	1992	11	0
Japan	1993	15	2
Japan	1994	9	1
Japan	1995	16	1
Japan	1996	13	0
Japan	1997	21	1
Japan	1998	10	0
Japan	1999	3	0
Total		122	5

Scores and results list Japan's goal tally first, score column indicates score after each Ihara goal.

List of international goals scored by Masami Ihara
No.	Date	Venue	Opponent	Score	Result	Competition
1	5 May 1993	Dubai, United Arab Emirates	Sri Lanka	2–0	6–0	1994 FIFA World Cup qualification
2	5 May 1993	Dubai, United Arab Emirates	Sri Lanka	3–0	6–0	1994 FIFA World Cup qualification
3	11 October 1994	Hiroshima, Japan	South Korea	2–2	2–3	1994 Asian Games
4	3 June 1995	London, England	England	1–1	1–2	Umbro Cup
5	8 November 1997	Tokyo, Japan	Kazakhstan	4–0	5–1	1998 FIFA World Cup qualification

== Managerial statistics ==
Team	From	To	Record				
Team	From	To	G	W	D	L	Win %
Kashiwa Reysol	2009	2009	2	0	1	1	0.00
Avispa Fukuoka	2015	2018	181	77	47	57	42.54
Kashiwa Reysol	2023	2024	78	21	25	32	26.92
Total			261	98	73	90	37.55

== Honours ==
Nissan Motors / Yokohama F - Marinos

- Emperor's Cup: 1991, 1992
- J1 League: 1995
- Asian Cup Winners' Cup: 1991–92, 1992–93

Júbilo Iwata

- Japanese Super Cup: 2000

Japan

- AFC Asian Cup: 1992

Individual

- Asian Footballer of the Year: 1995
- J.League Best XI: 1993, 1994, 1995, 1996, 1997
- MasterCard Asian/Oceanian Team of the 20th Century: 1998
- J.League 20th Anniversary Team
- J.League 30th Anniversary Team

== See also ==
- List of footballers with 100 or more caps
