= Shusuke Shimada =

Japanese footballer

Shusuke Shimada 島田 周輔
Personal information
- Full name: Shusuke Shimada
- Date of birth: July 10, 1976 (age 50)
- Place of birth: Kanagawa, Japan
- Height: 1.77 m (5 ft 9 1/2 in)
- Position: Forward

Youth career
- 1992–1994: Yokohama Marinos

Senior career*
Years	Team	Apps	(Gls)
1995–1996	Yokohama Marinos	1	(0)
1997–1998	Yokogawa Electric		
1999	Albirex Niigata	24	(1)
2000	Otsuka Pharmaceutical	21	(15)
Total		46	(16)
Medal record
Yokohama Marinos
Winner	J1 League	1995
- * Club domestic league appearances and goals

Shusuke Shimada (島田 周輔, Shimada Shusuke; born July 10, 1976) is a former Japanese football player.

== Playing career ==
Shimada was born in Kanagawa Prefecture on July 10, 1976. He joined his local club Yokohama Marinos from youth team in 1995. On April 15, he debuted against Bellmare Hiratsuka. However he could only play this match until 1996. In 1997, he moved to Regional Leagues club Yokogawa Electric. In 1999, he moved to newly was promoted to J2 League club, Albirex Niigata and he played many matches. In 2000, he moved to Japan Football League club Otsuka Pharmaceutical. He scored 15 goals and was elected Rookie of the Year award in 2000. However he retired end of 2000 season.

== Club statistics ==
Club performance			League		Cup		League Cup		Total	
Season	Club	League	Apps	Goals	Apps	Goals	Apps	Goals	Apps	Goals
Japan			League		Emperor's Cup		J.League Cup		Total	
1995	Yokohama Marinos	J1 League	1	0	0	0	-		1	0
1996	Yokohama Marinos	J1 League	0	0	0	0	0	0	0	0
1997	Yokogawa Electric	Regional Leagues								
1998	Yokogawa Electric	Regional Leagues								
1999	Albirex Niigata	J2 League	24	1	0	0	0	0	24	1
2000	Otsuka Pharmaceutical	Football League	21	15	2	1	-		23	16
Total			46	16	2	1	0	0	48	17
