= Masato Koga =

Japanese association football player

Masato Koga 古賀 正人
Personal information
- Full name: Masato Koga
- Date of birth: May 22, 1970 (age 56)
- Place of birth: Shizuoka, Shizuoka, Japan
- Height: 1.70 m (5 ft 7 in)
- Position: Midfielder

Youth career
- 1986–1988: Shimizu Commercial High School
- 1989–1992: Hosei University

Senior career*
Years	Team	Apps	(Gls)
1993–1996	Yokohama Marinos	27	(1)
1997–2000	Sagan Tosu	105	(11)
2001–2006	Sagawa Express Chukyo		
Total		132	(12)
Medal record
Yokohama Marinos
Winner	J1 League	1995
- * Club domestic league appearances and goals

Masato Koga (古賀 正人, Koga Masato; born May 22, 1970) is a former Japanese football player. His elder brother Takuma is also a former footballer.

== Playing career ==
Koga was born in Shizuoka on May 22, 1970. After graduating from Hosei University, he joined the Yokohama Marinos in 1993. He debuted in 1995 and he played many matches as an offensive midfielder. The club also won the league championship in 1995. However he did not play in any matches in 1996 and he moved to the Japan Football League club Sagan Tosu in 1997. He became a regular player and the club was promoted to the J2 League in 1999. In 2001, he moved to the Regional Leagues club Sagawa Express Chukyo. He retired at the end of the 2006 season.

== Career statistics ==
Appearances and goals by club, season and competition
Club	Season	League			Emperor's Cup		J.League Cup		Total	
Club	Season	Division	Apps	Goals	Apps	Goals	Apps	Goals	Apps	Goals
Yokohama Marinos	1993	J1 League	0	0	0	0	0	0	0	0
Yokohama Marinos	1994	J1 League	0	0	0	0	0	0	0	0
Yokohama Marinos	1995	J1 League	25	1	2	0	—		27	1
Yokohama Marinos	1996	J1 League	2	0	0	0	3	0	5	0
Sagan Tosu	1997	Football League	26	2	3	1	6	0	35	3
Sagan Tosu	1998	Football League	22	5	3	0	—		25	5
Sagan Tosu	1999	J2 League	29	4	2	0	1	0	32	4
Sagan Tosu	2000	J2 League	28	0	2	1	2	0	32	1
Career total			132	12	12	2	12	0	156	14
