= Shinji Makino =

Japanese footballer

Shinji Makino 牧野 真二
Personal information
- Full name: Shinji Makino
- Date of birth: May 29, 1976 (age 50)
- Place of birth: Fukuoka, Japan
- Height: 1.80 m (5 ft 11 in)
- Position: Midfielder

Youth career
- 1992–1994: Tokai University Daigo High School

Senior career*
Years	Team	Apps	(Gls)
1995	Yokohama Marinos	0	(0)
1998–1999	Sagan Tosu	12	(0)
Total		12	(0)

International career
2005–2015	Japan Beach Soccer		
Medal record
Yokohama Marinos
Winner	J1 League	1995
- * Club domestic league appearances and goals

Shinji Makino (牧野 真二, Makino Shinji; born May 29, 1976) is a former Japanese football player.

== Playing career ==
Makino was born in Fukuoka Prefecture on May 29, 1976. After graduating from high school, he joined Yokohama Marinos in 1995. Although the club won the champions J1 League, he could not play at all in the match and left the club end of 1995 season. In 1998, he joined Japan Football League club Sagan Tosu. The club was promoted to J2 League in 1999. He played 12 matches as midfielder in 2 seasons. He retired end of 1999 season.

== Beach soccer career ==
In 2005, Makino was selected Japan national beach soccer team for 2005 Beach Soccer World Cup. Japan team won the 4th place. He played at Beach Soccer World Cup 7 times; 2005, 2006, 2008, 2009, 2011, 2013 and 2015.

== Career statistics ==
Appearances and goals by club, season and competition
Club	Season	League			Emperor's Cup		J.League Cup		Total	
Club	Season	Division	Apps	Goals	Apps	Goals	Apps	Goals	Apps	Goals
Yokohama Marinos	1995	J1 League	0	0	0	0	—		0	0
Sagan Tosu	1998	Football League	4	0	2	0	—		6	0
Sagan Tosu	1999	J2 League	8	0	0	0	2	0	10	0
Career total			12	0	2	0	2	0	16	0
