= Masaharu Suzuki =

Japanese footballer

Masaharu Suzuki 鈴木 正治
Personal information
- Full name: Masaharu Suzuki
- Date of birth: August 3, 1970 (age 56)
- Place of birth: Yaizu, Shizuoka, Japan
- Height: 1.68 m (5 ft 6 in)
- Position: Defender

Youth career
- 1986–1988: Shizuoka Gakuen High School

Senior career*
Years	Team	Apps	(Gls)
1989–1997	Yokohama Marinos	143	(4)
1997–1998	Nagoya Grampus Eight	2	(0)
Total		145	(4)

International career
1995–1996	Japan	2	(0)
Medal record
Yokohama Marinos
Winner	Japan Soccer League	1989/90
Runner-up	Japan Soccer League	1990/91
Runner-up	Japan Soccer League	1991/92
Winner	J1 League	1995
Winner	JSL Cup	1989
Winner	JSL Cup	1990
Winner	Emperor's Cup	1989
Winner	Emperor's Cup	1991
Winner	Emperor's Cup	1992
Runner-up	Emperor's Cup	1990
- * Club domestic league appearances and goals

Masaharu Suzuki (鈴木 正治, Suzuki Masaharu; born August 3, 1970) is a former Japanese football player. He played twice for the Japan national team.

== Club career ==
Suzuki was born in Yaizu on August 3, 1970. After graduating from Shizuoka Gakuen High School, he joined Japan Soccer League club Nissan Motors (later Yokohama Marinos) in 1989. In 1989-90, the club won all three major title in Japan; Japan Soccer League, JSL Cup and Emperor's Cup. The club also won 1990 JSL Cup and 1991 Emperor's Cup. In Asia, the club won 1991–92 Asian Cup Winners' Cup. In 1992, Japan Soccer League was folded and founded new league J1 League. The club won 1992 Emperor's Cup. In Asia, the club won 1992–93 Asian Cup Winners' Cup for 2 years in a row. In 1995, the club won J1 League and he was selected Best Eleven. He moved to Nagoya Grampus Eight in 1997. He retired at the end of the 1998 season.

== National team career ==
On October 24, 1995, Suzuki debuted for Japan national team against Saudi Arabia. He also played in 1996. He played 2 games for Japan until 1996.

== Club statistics ==
Club performance			League		Cup		League Cup		Total	
Season	Club	League	Apps	Goals	Apps	Goals	Apps	Goals	Apps	Goals
Japan			League		Emperor's Cup		J.League Cup		Total	
1989/90	Nissan Motors	JSL Division 1	5	0			0	0	5	0
1990/91	Nissan Motors	JSL Division 1	22	0			0	0	22	0
1991/92	Nissan Motors	JSL Division 1	0	0			0	0	0	0
1992	Yokohama Marinos	J1 League	-		3	0	0	0	3	0
1993	Yokohama Marinos	J1 League	5	0	0	0	2	0	7	0
1994	Yokohama Marinos	J1 League	34	0	4	0	3	0	41	0
1995	Yokohama Marinos	J1 League	50	4	2	0	-		52	0
1996	Yokohama Marinos	J1 League	27	0	1	0	4	0	32	0
1997	Yokohama Marinos	J1 League	0	0	0	0	6	0	6	0
1997	Nagoya Grampus Eight	J1 League	1	0	0	0	0	0	1	0
1998	Nagoya Grampus Eight	J1 League	1	0	0	0	0	0	1	0
Total			145	4	10	0	15	0	143	4

== National team statistics ==
Japan national team
Year	Apps	Goals
1995	1	0
1996	1	0
Total	2	0

== Awards ==
- J.League Best XI – 1995
