= Ramón Medina Bello =

Argentine footballer (born 1966)

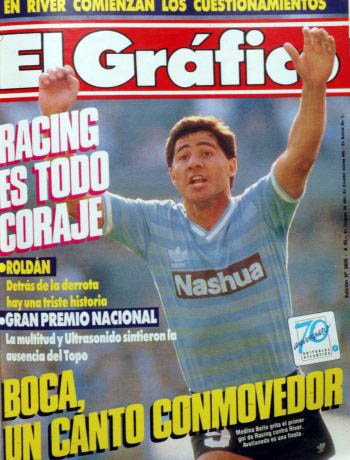

Personal information
- Full name: Ramón Ismael Medina Bello
- Date of birth: 29 April 1966 (age 60)
- Place of birth: Gualeguay, Argentina
- Height: 1.73 m (5 ft 8 in)
- Position: Striker

Senior career*
Years	Team	Apps	(Gls)
1986–1989	Racing Club	108	(25)
1989–1993	River Plate	140	(47)
1994–1995	Yokohama Marinos	70	(36)
1996–1997	River Plate	40	(10)
1997–1999	Talleres	26	(3)
2001–2004	Dock Sud	74	(26)
2005	Juventud Unida	10	(6)
Total		468	(153)

International career
1991–1994	Argentina	17	(5)
- * Club domestic league appearances and goals

Ramón Ismael Medina Bello (born 29 April 1966), nicknamed El Mencho, is an Argentine former professional footballer who played as a striker at club level in Argentina and Japan. Meidna Bello had a notable stint in River Plate, where he won the 1996 Copa Libertadores, and won the 1991 and 1993 Copa América with the Argentina national team.

== Club career ==
Medina Bello was born in Gualeguay, Entre Ríos. He began his professional football career in 1986 with Racing Club de Avellaneda. In 1989, he was transferred to River Plate, where he played until 1993. By that time, he was part of the Argentina national team, with whom he won the 1991 Copa América in Chile. He was also part of the national team in the 1994 FIFA World Cup.

Medina Bello went to play in Japan for the Yokohama Marinos until 1996, when he returned to River Plate. He retired in 1999 in Talleres and, after two years of retirement, played for Dock Sud in the Argentine Soccer League Fourth Division. In 2005, he played for Juventud Unida where he retired for good.

== International career ==
Medina Bello appeared in 2 games during the 1994 FIFA World Cup.

- 30 June 1994: Argentina – Bulgaria 0–2 ( In the 67th minute he replaced Leonardo Rodriguez )
- 3 July 1994: Romania – Argentina 3–2 ( In the 63rd minute he replaced Roberto Sensini )

== Career statistics ==
=== Club ===
Club performance			League	
Season	Club	League	Apps	Goals
Argentina			League	
1988–89	River Plate	Primera División	2	0
1989–90	River Plate	Primera División	32	9
1990–91	River Plate	Primera División	29	8
1991–92	River Plate	Primera División	31	6
1992–93	River Plate	Primera División	37	16
1993–94	River Plate	Primera División	9	8
Japan			League	
1994	Yokohama Marinos	J1 League	30	15
1995	Yokohama Marinos	J1 League	40	21
Argentina			League	
1995–96	River Plate	Primera División	10	2
1996–97	River Plate	Primera División	10	1
1997–98	River Plate	Primera División	20	7
1997–98	Talleres	Primera B Nacional	12	3
1998–99	Talleres	Primera División	14	0
2001–02	Dock Sud		11	5
2002–03	Dock Sud		0	0
2003–04	Dock Sud		0	0
2004–05	Juventud Unida		0	0
2005–06	Juventud Unida		10	6
Country	Argentina		227	71
Country	Japan		70	36
Total			297	107

=== International ===
Argentina national team
Year	Apps	Goals
1991	4	0
1992	2	1
1993	8	4
1994	3	0
Total	17	5

== Honours ==
Racing Club

- Supercopa Sudamericana: 1988

River Plate

- Argentine Primera División: 1989–90, 1991 Apertura, 1993 Apertura, 1994 Apertura, 1996 Apertura, 1997 Apertura, 1997 Clausura
- Copa Libertadores: 1996
- Intercontinental Cup runner-up: 1996
- Supercopa Sudamericana: 1997

Talleres de Córdoba

- Primera B Nacional: 1997–98

Argentina

- Copa América: 1991, 1993
