= David Bisconti =

Argentine footballer

Personal information
- Full name: Carlos David Nazareno Bisconti
- Date of birth: September 22, 1968 (age 58)
- Place of birth: Murphy, Santa Fe, Argentina
- Height: 1.80 m (5 ft 11 in)
- Positions: Midfielder; striker

Youth career
- Rosario Central

Senior career*
| Years | Team | Apps | (Gls) |
| 1988–1993 | Rosario Central | 154 | (28) |
| 1993–1996 | Yokohama Marinos | 121 | (53) |
| 1997–1998 | Universidad Católica | 40 | (25) |
| 1998–1999 | Badajoz | 13 | (2) |
| 1999–2000 | Gimnasia de Jujuy | 21 | (3) |
| 2000–2002 | Avispa Fukuoka | 32 | (13) |
| 2002 | Sagan Tosu | 24 | (16) |
| Total | | 405 | (140) |

International career
| 1991 | Argentina | 5 | (1) |
- * Club domestic league appearances and goals

Carlos David Nazareno Bisconti (born 22 September 1968), known as David Bisconti, is an Argentine former footballer who made 5 appearances for the Argentina national team.

== Career ==
Born in Murphy, Santa Fe, Argentina, Bisconti played the majority of his football for Rosario Central and Yokohama Marinos in Japan. He also played for Universidad Católica in Chile, Badajoz in Spain, Gimnasia y Esgrima de Jujuy in Argentina, and two other Japanese teams; Avispa Fukuoka and Sagan Tosu.

== Club statistics ==
| Club performance | | | League | | Cup | | League Cup | | Total | |
| Season | Club | League | Apps | Goals | Apps | Goals | Apps | Goals | Apps | Goals |
| Argentina | | | League | | Cup | | League Cup | | Total | |
|---|---|---|---|---|---|---|---|---|---|---|
| 1988/89 | Rosario Central | Primera División | 33 | 2 | | | | | 33 | 2 |
| 1989/90 | Rosario Central | Primera División | 35 | 5 | | | | | 35 | 5 |
| 1990/91 | Rosario Central | Primera División | 36 | 12 | | | | | 36 | 12 |
| 1991/92 | Rosario Central | Primera División | 38 | 10 | | | | | 38 | 10 |
| 1992/93 | Rosario Central | Primera División | 12 | 1 | | | | | 12 | 1 |
| Japan | | | League | | Emperor's Cup | | J.League Cup | | Total | |
| 1993 | Yokohama Marinos | J1 League | 27 | 8 | 3 | 1 | 5 | 1 | 35 | 10 |
| 1994 | Yokohama Marinos | J1 League | 25 | 11 | 4 | 1 | 3 | 1 | 32 | 13 |
| 1995 | Yokohama Marinos | J1 League | 48 | 27 | 0 | 0 | - | | 48 | 27 |
| 1996 | Yokohama Marinos | J1 League | 21 | 7 | 0 | 0 | 13 | 4 | 34 | 11 |
| Chile | | | League | | Copa Chile | | League Cup | | Total | |
| 1997 | Universidad Católica | Primera División | 29 | 23 | | | | | 29 | 23 |
| 1998 | Universidad Católica | Primera División | 11 | 2 | | | | | 11 | 2 |
| Spain | | | League | | Copa del Rey | | Copa de la Liga | | Total | |
| 1998/99 | Badajoz | Segunda División | 13 | 2 | | | | | 13 | 2 |
| Argentina | | | League | | Cup | | League Cup | | Total | |
| 1999/00 | Gimnasia y Esgrima Jujuy | Primera División | 21 | 3 | | | | | 21 | 3 |
| Japan | | | League | | Emperor's Cup | | J.League Cup | | Total | |
| 2000 | Avispa Fukuoka | J1 League | 12 | 6 | 0 | 0 | 0 | 0 | 12 | 6 |
| 2001 | Avispa Fukuoka | J1 League | 5 | 3 | 0 | 0 | 2 | 0 | 7 | 3 |
| 2002 | Avispa Fukuoka | J2 League | 15 | 4 | 0 | 0 | - | | 15 | 4 |
| 2002 | Sagan Tosu | J2 League | 24 | 10 | 2 | 6 | - | | 26 | 16 |
| Country | Argentina | | 175 | 33 | | | | | 175 | 33 |
| Country | Japan | | 177 | 76 | 9 | 8 | 23 | 6 | 209 | 90 |
| Country | Chile | | 40 | 25 | | | | | 40 | 25 |
| Country | Spain | | 13 | 2 | | | | | 13 | 2 |
| Total | | | 405 | 136 | 9 | 8 | 23 | 6 | 437 | 150 |

== National team statistics ==
Argentina national team
| Year | Apps | Goals |
|---|---|---|
| 1991 | 5 | 1 |
| Total | 5 | 1 |
