= Gustavo Zapata =

Argentine footballer and manager

Personal information
- Full name: Gustavo Miguel Zapata
- Date of birth: 15 October 1967 (age 59)
- Place of birth: Saladillo, Argentina
- Height: 1.75 m (5 ft 9 in)
- Position: Midfielder

Team information
- Current team: Tigre (assistant)

Senior career*
Years	Team	Apps	(Gls)
1986–1989	CA Temperley		
1989–1993	River Plate	97	(1)
1993–1996	Yokohama Marinos	95	(3)
1996–2000	San Lorenzo Almagro	46	(0)
2000–2001	Chacarita Juniors	11	(0)

International career
1991–1998	Argentina	27	(0)

Managerial career
- 2002–2003: Nueva Chicago (assistant)
- 2004–2005: Lanús (assistant)
- 2006–2007: Rosario Central (assistant)
- 2007–2008: Argentinos Juniors (assistant)
- 2009: River Plate (assistant)
- 2011: River Plate (assistant)
- 2011–2012: Independiente Rivadavia
- 2012–2015: River Plate II
- 2014: River Plate (caretaker)
- 2015: Racing Club II
- 2015–2016: Almería (assistant)
- 2019–: Tigre (assistant)
- * Club domestic league appearances and goals

Gustavo Miguel Zapata (born 15 October 1967 in Saladillo) is a retired Argentine footballer who played as a midfielder. He played for the Argentina national team at the 1991 Copa América in Chile, the 1993 Copa América in Ecuador, and in 1998 FIFA World Cup qualification.

== Coaching career ==
In the 2002/03 season, Zapata was the assistant manager of Néstor Gorosito at Nueva Chicago. In December 2004, he followed Gorosito when he was appointed as manager of Club Atlético Lanús.

In December 2008, the duo was appointed in River Plate. In 2011, he was once again appointed as assistant manager of River Plate, this time under manager Matías Almeyda. A half year later, he was appointed as the manager of Independiente Rivadavia. He was fired on 25 February 2019, after the team conceded 10 goals in two games.

In November 2012, Zapata took over the reserve team of River Plate. From May 27 to May 30, Zapata was the caretaker manager of River Plate following the departure of Ramon Diaz. On 11 February 2015, Zapata and his staff was surprisingly fired.

In the summer 2015, Zapata was then appointed as the manager of Racing Club's reserve team.

In December 2015, Néstor Gorosito was appointed as manager of Spanish club UD Almería and took Zapata with him as his assistant. On 12 February 2019, Zapata was appointed as the assistant manager of Néstor Gorosito at Tigre.

== Career statistics ==
=== Club ===
Club performance			League		Cup		League Cup		Total	
Season	Club	League	Apps	Goals	Apps	Goals	Apps	Goals	Apps	Goals
Argentina			League		Cup		League Cup		Total	
1989–90	River Plate	Primera División	0	0					0	0
1990–91	River Plate	Primera División	32	0					32	0
1991–92	River Plate	Primera División	28	1					28	1
1992–93	River Plate	Primera División	36	0					36	0
1993–94	River Plate	Primera División	1	0					1	0
Japan			League		Emperor's Cup		J.League Cup		Total	
1993	Yokohama Marinos	J1 League	3	0	3	0	0	0	6	0
1994	Yokohama Marinos	J1 League	20	2	4	0	2	0	26	2
1995	Yokohama Marinos	J1 League	46	1	0	0	-		46	1
1996	Yokohama Marinos	J1 League	26	0	1	0	11	2	38	2
Argentina			League		Cup		League Cup		Total	
1996–97	San Lorenzo Almagro	Primera División	14	0					14	0
1997–98	San Lorenzo Almagro	Primera División	24	0					24	0
1998–99	San Lorenzo Almagro	Primera División	8	0					8	0
1999–2000	San Lorenzo Almagro	Primera División	0	0					0	0
2000–01	Chacarita Juniors	Primera División	11	0					11	0
Country	Argentina		154	1					154	1
Country	Japan		95	3	8	0	13	2	116	5
Total			249	4	8	0	13	2	270	6

=== International ===
Argentina national team
Year	Apps	Goals
1991	4	0
1992	0	0
1993	14	0
1994	0	0
1995	0	0
1996	0	0
1997	7	0
1998	2	0
Total	27	0

== Honours ==
=== International ===
Argentina

- Copa América Champions : 1991, 1993
