= 1995 J.League =

3rd season of J1 League

J.League
- Season: 1995
- Champions: Yokohama Marinos; 1st J.League title 3rd Japanese title
- Asian Club Championship: Yokohama Marinos
- Matches: 364
- Goals: 1,214 (3.34 per match)
- Top goalscorer: Masahiro Fukuda (32 goals)
- Highest attendance: 56,652 – Reds vs. Verdy (May 3)
- Lowest attendance: 7,012 – Sanfrecce vs. Grampus (April 12)
- Average attendance: 16,922

The J.League 1995 season was the third season of the J.League. The league fixture began on March 18 and ended in 25 November. The Suntory Championship '95 took place on November 30 and December 6.

== Clubs ==
Fourteen clubs participated in J.League during 1995 season. Of these clubs, Kashiwa Reysol and Cerezo Osaka were newly promoted teams from Japan Football League.

Club name	Hometown	Stadium (majority games)	Capacity	Notes	Head coach
Bellmare Hiratsuka	Hiratsuka, Kanagawa	Hiratsuka Stadium	15,380		(Japan) Mitsuru Komaeda
Cerezo Osaka	Osaka	Nagai Stadium	47,816	Promoted	(Brazil) Paulo Emilio
Gamba Osaka	Osaka, Osaka	Osaka Expo '70 Stadium	21,000		(Germany) Sigfried Held
JEF United Ichihara	Chiba, Chiba	Ichihara Seaside Stadium	14,051		(Japan) Eijun Kiyokumo
Júbilo Iwata	Iwata, Shizuoka	Júbilo Iwata Stadium	15,165		(Netherlands) Hans Ooft
Kashima Antlers	Kashima, Ibaraki	Kashima Soccer Stadium	37,638		(Brazil) Edu Coimbra
Kashiwa Reysol	Kashiwa	Hitachi Kashiwa Stadium	15,349	Promoted	(Brazil) Antoninho
Nagoya Grampus Eight	Nagoya, Aichi	Paloma Mizuho Rugby Stadium	11,900		(France) Arsène Wenger
Sanfrecce Hiroshima	Hiroshima, Hiroshima	Hiroshima General Ground Main Stadium	13,800		(Netherlands) Wim Jansen
Shimizu S-Pulse	Shimizu-ku, Shizuoka, Shizuoka Prefecture	Nihondaira Sports Stadium	20,248		(Japan) Masakatsu Miyamoto
Urawa Red Diamonds	Saitama, Greater Tokyo Area	Urawa Komaba Stadium	21,500		(Germany) Holger Osieck
Verdy Kawasaki	Kawasaki, Kanagawa	Todoroki Athletics Stadium	26,232		(Brazil) Nelsinho Baptista
Yokohama Flügels	Yokohama	Yokohama Mitsuzawa Stadium	15,454		(Brazil) Antônio Silva
Yokohama Marinos	Yokohama	Yokohama Mitsuzawa Stadium	15,454		(Japan) Hiroshi Hayano

=== Foreign players ===
Club	Player 1	Player 2	Player 3	Player 4	Player 5	Non-visa foreign	Former players
Bellmare Hiratsuka	(Brazil) Betinho	(Brazil) Edson	(Brazil) Émerson	(Brazil) Júnior	(Brazil) Simão		(Brazil) Almir
Cerezo Osaka	(Brazil) Bernardo	(Brazil) Gilmar	(Brazil) Marquinhos	(Brazil) Toninho Cecílio	(Panama) Jorge Dely Valdés		
Gamba Osaka	(Belarus) Sergei Aleinikov	(Croatia) Vjekoslav Škrinjar	(Netherlands) Hans Gillhaus	(Ukraine) Akhrik Tsveiba	(Ukraine) Oleh Protasov		
JEF United Ichihara	(Federal Republic of Yugoslavia) Goran Vasilijević	(Federal Republic of Yugoslavia) Nenad Maslovar	(New Zealand) Wynton Rufer			(Brazil) Sandro (South Korea) Shin Che-bon	
Júbilo Iwata	(Brazil) Dunga	(Italy) Salvatore Schillaci	(Netherlands) André Paus	(Netherlands) Gerald Vanenburg		(Netherlands) Dido Havenaar (North Korea) Kim Jong-song	
Kashima Antlers	(Brazil) Carlos Mozer	(Brazil) Jorginho	(Brazil) Leonardo	(Brazil) Mazinho			(Brazil) Santos
Kashiwa Reysol	(Brazil) Bentinho	(Brazil) Careca	(Brazil) Nelsinho	(Brazil) Valdir	(Brazil) Wolnei Caio		(Brazil) Müller
Nagoya Grampus Eight	(Brazil) Alexandre Torres	(Federal Republic of Yugoslavia) Dragan Stojković	(France) Franck Durix	(France) Gérald Passi			
Sanfrecce Hiroshima	(Czech Republic) Ivan Hašek	(Netherlands) John van Loen	(Netherlands) Pieter Huistra	(South Korea) Noh Jung-yoon		(Brazil) Andrey	(Norway) Tore Pedersen
Shimizu S-Pulse	(Brazil) Dias	(Brazil) Marcelo Miguel	(Brazil) Marco Aurélio	(Brazil) Santos	(Italy) Daniele Massaro	(Brazil) Ademir	(Brazil) Ronaldão (Brazil) Sidmar
Urawa Red Diamonds	(Brazil) Toninho	(Germany) Guido Buchwald	(Germany) Michael Rummenigge	(Germany) Uwe Bein		(Peru) Edwin Uehara (South Korea) Cho Kwi-jae	(South Korea) Gwak Kyung-keun
Verdy Kawasaki	(Brazil) Alcindo	(Brazil) Bismarck	(Brazil) Embu	(Brazil) Pereira		(Bolivia) Ko Ishikawa	
Yokohama Flügels	(Brazil) César Sampaio	(Brazil) Evair	(Brazil) Rodrigo Batata	(Brazil) Zinho			
Yokohama Marinos	(Argentina) David Bisconti	(Argentina) Gustavo Zapata	(Argentina) Pedro Massacessi	(Argentina) Ramón Medina Bello			(Argentina) Ramón Díaz

== Format ==
In the 1995 season, the league followed split-season format, and each halves (or stages) were known as Suntory Series and NICOS Series for sponsorship purposes. In each series, fourteen clubs played in double round-robin format, a total of 26 games per club (per series). The games went to golden-goal extra time and penalties if needed after regulation. The points system is introduced for the first time and a club received 3pts for any win, 1pts for PK loss, and 0pts for regulation or extra time loss. The clubs were ranked by points and tie breakers are, in the following order:

- Goal differential
- Goals scored
- Head-to-head results
- Extra match or a coin toss

The club that finished at the top of the table is declared stage champion and qualifies for the Suntory Championship. The first stage winner, hosts the first leg in the championship series. If the same club win both stages, the runners-up of each stages plays against each other and the winners challenges the stage winner at the championship game.

Changes in Competition Format

- Number of competing clubs increased from 12 to 14
- Number of games per club in a series increased from 22 to 26 games and from 44 to 52 games per season
- Points system were introduced
- Due to fixture congestion, Yamazaki Nabisco Cup was cancelled that year

== Standings ==
=== Suntory Series (1st Stage) standings ===
Pos	Team	Pld	W	PKL	L	GF	GA	GD	Pts	Qualification
1	(Kanagawa Prefecture) Yokohama Marinos	26	17	1	8	47	38	+9	52	1995 Suntory Series Champions; Qualified to Suntory Championship '95
2	(Tokyo) Verdy Kawasaki	26	16	1	9	46	36	+10	49	
3	(Saitama Prefecture) Urawa Red Diamonds	26	15	3	8	41	34	+7	48	
4	(Aichi Prefecture) Nagoya Grampus Eight	26	15	1	10	50	48	+2	46	
5	(Shizuoka Prefecture) Júbilo Iwata	26	15	0	11	48	40	+8	45	
6	(Chiba Prefecture) JEF United Ichihara	26	14	3	9	48	40	+8	45	
7	(Kanagawa Prefecture) Bellmare Hiratsuka	26	14	1	11	60	47	+13	43	
8	(Ibaraki Prefecture) Kashima Antlers	26	14	0	12	38	38	0	42	
9	(Osaka Prefecture) Cerezo Osaka	26	13	2	11	43	44	−1	41	
10	(Hiroshima Prefecture) Sanfrecce Hiroshima	26	13	0	13	38	33	+5	39	
11	(Osaka Prefecture) Gamba Osaka	26	10	1	15	49	54	−5	31	
12	(Shizuoka Prefecture) Shimizu S-Pulse	26	10	0	16	35	63	−28	30	
13	(Kanagawa Prefecture) Yokohama Flügels	26	9	1	16	42	54	−12	28	
14	(Chiba Prefecture) Kashiwa Reysol	26	7	1	18	30	46	−16	22	

Rules for classification: Win = 3pts; P.K. loss = 1pt; Regulation, E.T. loss = 0pts

=== NICOS Series (2nd stage) standings ===
Pos	Team	Pld	W	PKL	L	GF	GA	GD	Pts	Qualification
1	Verdy Kawasaki	26	19	2	5	60	26	+34	59	1995 NICOS Series Champions; Qualified to Suntory Championship '95
2	Nagoya Grampus Eight	26	17	0	9	49	34	+15	51	
3	Yokohama Marinos	26	15	1	10	39	37	+2	46	
4	Shimizu S-Pulse	26	15	0	11	42	34	+8	45	
5	Kashiwa Reysol	26	14	1	11	57	54	+3	43	
6	Kashima Antlers	26	14	1	11	44	41	+3	43	
7	JEF United Ichihara	26	14	1	11	49	51	−2	43	
8	Urawa Red Diamonds	26	14	0	12	44	38	+6	42	
9	Júbilo Iwata	26	13	1	12	40	37	+3	40	
10	Cerezo Osaka	26	12	1	13	36	39	−3	37	
11	Yokohama Flügels	26	11	1	14	36	57	−21	34	
12	Sanfrecce Hiroshima	26	9	1	16	31	43	−12	28	
13	Gamba Osaka	26	8	2	16	38	53	−15	26	
14	Bellmare Hiratsuka	26	7	1	18	34	55	−21	22	

Rules for classification: Win = 3pts; P.K. loss = 1pt; Regulation, E.T. loss = 0pts

=== 1995 Suntory Championship ===
November 30, 1995

Yokohama Marinos	1–0	Verdy Kawasaki
Bisconti 49'

Tokyo National Stadium, Tokyo
Attendance: 47,631
Referee: Zoran Petrović

December 6, 1995

Verdy Kawasaki	0–1	Yokohama Marinos
		Ihara 29'

Tokyo National Stadium, Tokyo
Attendance: 48,271
Referee: Shinichiro Obata

Yokohama Marinos won the series 2–0 on aggregate.

== Top scorers ==
Rank	Scorer	Club	Goals
1	(Japan) Masahiro Fukuda	Urawa Red Diamonds	32
2	(Italy) Salvatore Schillaci	Júbilo Iwata	31
3	(Argentina) David Bisconti	Yokohama Marinos	27
4	(Brazil) Betinho	Bellmare Hiratsuka	25
5	(Japan) Kazuyoshi Miura	Verdy Kawasaki	23
5	(Japan) Koji Noguchi	Bellmare Hiratsuka	23
7	(Argentina) Ramón Medina Bello	Yokohama Marinos	21
7	(New Zealand) Wynton Rufer	JEF United Ichihara	21
9	(Japan) Nobuhiro Takeda	Verdy Kawasaki	20
9	(Netherlands) Hans Gillhaus	Gamba Osaka	20

== Honours ==
Competition	Champion	Runner-up	3rd place
League competition
J.League Suntory Series	Yokohama Marinos	Verdy Kawasaki	Urawa Red Diamonds
J.League NICOS Series	Verdy Kawasaki	Nagoya Grampus Eight	Yokohama Marinos
Suntory Championship	Yokohama Marinos	Verdy Kawasaki	n/a
Cup tournaments
Emperor's Cup	Nagoya Grampus Eight	Sanfrecce Hiroshima	n/a
Nabisco Cup	Not held due to fixture congestion		
XEROX Super Cup	Verdy Kawasaki	Bellmare Hiratsuka	n/a

== Awards ==
=== Individual awards ===
Award	Recipient	Club
Most Valuable Player	(Federal Republic of Yugoslavia) Dragan Stojković	Nagoya Grampus Eight
Rookie of the Year	(Japan) Yoshikatsu Kawaguchi	Yokohama Marinos
Manager of the Year	(France) Arsène Wenger	Nagoya Grampus Eight
Top Scorer	(Japan) Masahiro Fukuda	Urawa Red Diamonds

=== Best Eleven ===
Position	Footballer	Club	Nationality
GK	Shinkichi Kikuchi	Verdy Kawasaki	Japan
DF	Guido Buchwald	Urawa Red Diamonds	Germany
DF	Masami Ihara	Yokohama Marinos	Japan
DF	Masaharu Suzuki	Yokohama Marinos	Japan
DF	Naoki Soma	Kashima Antlers	Japan
MF	Bismarck	Verdy Kawasaki	Brazil
MF	Tetsuji Hashiratani	Verdy Kawasaki	Japan
FW	Masahiro Fukuda	Urawa Red Diamonds	Japan
FW	Kazuyoshi Miura	Verdy Kawasaki	Japan
FW	Hiroaki Morishima	Cerezo Osaka	Japan
FW	Dragan Stojković	Nagoya Grampus Eight	FR Yugoslavia
