= Junji Koizumi =

Japanese footballer

Junji Koizumi 小泉 淳嗣
Personal information
- Full name: Junji Koizumi
- Date of birth: January 11, 1968 (age 58)
- Place of birth: Tochigi, Japan
- Height: 1.83 m (6 ft 0 in)
- Position: Defender

Youth career
- 1983–1985: Utsunomiya Gakuen High School
- 1986–1987: Kokushikan University

Senior career*
Years	Team	Apps	(Gls)
1988–1995	Yokohama Marinos	73	(3)
1995–1996	Yokohama Flügels	31	(0)
1997	Kawasaki Frontale	22	(0)
Total		126	(3)
Medal record
Yokohama Marinos
Winner	Japan Soccer League	1988/89
Winner	Japan Soccer League	1989/90
Runner-up	Japan Soccer League	1990/91
Runner-up	Japan Soccer League	1991/92
Winner	J1 League	1995
Winner	JSL Cup	1988
Winner	JSL Cup	1989
Winner	JSL Cup	1990
Winner	Emperor's Cup	1988
Winner	Emperor's Cup	1989
Winner	Emperor's Cup	1991
Winner	Emperor's Cup	1992
Runner-up	Emperor's Cup	1990
- * Club domestic league appearances and goals

Junji Koizumi (小泉 淳嗣, Koizumi Junji; born January 11, 1968) is a former Japanese football player.

== Playing career ==
Koizumi was born in Tochigi Prefecture on January 11, 1968. After dropped out from Kokushikan University, he joined Nissan Motors (later Yokohama Marinos) in 1988. He debuted in 1990 and he played many matches as center back and defensive midfielder. The club won 1990 JSL Cup, 1991 and 1992 Emperor's Cup. In Asia, the club won 1991–92 and 1992–93 Asian Cup Winners' Cup In 1995, he lost his opportunity to play and moved to rival club in Yokohama, Yokohama Flügels. In 1997, he moved to Japan Football League club Kawasaki Frontale. He retired end of 1997 season.

== Club statistics ==
Club performance			League		Cup		League Cup		Total	
Season	Club	League	Apps	Goals	Apps	Goals	Apps	Goals	Apps	Goals
Japan			League		Emperor's Cup		J.League Cup		Total	
1988/89	Nissan Motors	JSL Division 1	0	0					0	0
1989/90	Nissan Motors	JSL Division 1	0	0			0	0	0	0
1990/91	Nissan Motors	JSL Division 1	19	0			0	0	19	0
1991/92	Nissan Motors	JSL Division 1	10	0			0	0	10	0
1992	Yokohama Marinos	J1 League	-				9	0	9	0
1993	Yokohama Marinos	J1 League	27	2	3	0	2	0	32	2
1994	Yokohama Marinos	J1 League	14	0	0	0	0	0	14	0
1995	Yokohama Marinos	J1 League	3	1	0	0	-		3	1
1995	Yokohama Flügels	J1 League	15	0	2	0	-		17	0
1996	Yokohama Flügels	J1 League	16	0	0	0	5	0	21	0
1997	Kawasaki Frontale	Football League	22	0	0	0	-		22	0
Total			126	3	5	0	16	0	147	3
