= Shigetatsu Matsunaga =

Japanese footballer

Shigetatsu Matsunaga 松永 成立
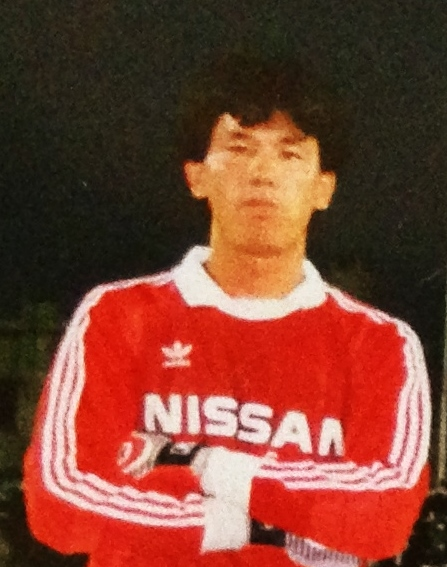

Personal information
- Full name: Shigetatsu Matsunaga
- Date of birth: 12 August 1962 (age 64)
- Place of birth: Hamamatsu, Shizuoka, Japan
- Height: 1.80 m (5 ft 11 in)
- Position: Goalkeeper

Team information
- Current team: Yokohama Marinos (goalkeeper coach)

Youth career
- 1978–1980: Hamana High School

College career
Years	Team	Apps	(Gls)
1981–1984	Aichi Gakuin University		

Senior career*
Years	Team	Apps	(Gls)
1985–1995	Yokohama Marinos	334	(0)
1995–1996	Tosu Futures	54	(0)
1997	Brummell Sendai	15	(0)
1997–2000	Kyoto Purple Sanga	85	(0)
Total		488	(0)

International career
1988–1995	Japan	40	(0)
Medal record
Nissan Motors / Yokohama Marinos
Winner	Japan Soccer League	1988/89
Winner	Japan Soccer League	1989/90
Runner-up	Japan Soccer League	1990/91
Runner-up	Japan Soccer League	1991/92
Winner	J1 League	1995
Winner	JSL Cup	1988
Winner	JSL Cup	1989
Winner	JSL Cup	1990
Runner-up	JSL Cup	1985
Runner-up	JSL Cup	1986
Winner	Emperor's Cup	1985
Winner	Emperor's Cup	1988
Winner	Emperor's Cup	1989
Winner	Emperor's Cup	1991
Winner	Emperor's Cup	1992
Runner-up	Emperor's Cup	1990
Representing Japan
AFC Asian Cup
Gold medal – first place	1992 Japan
- * Club domestic league appearances and goals

Shigetatsu Matsunaga (松永 成立, Shigetatsu Matsunaga; born 12 August 1962) is a Japanese football goalkeeper coach and former football player. He is the goalkeeper coach for J1 League club Yokohama Marinos.

== Club career ==
Matsunaga was educated at and played for Hamana High School and Aichi Gakuin University. After graduating from the university, he joined Nissan Motors (later Yokohama Marinos) in 1985. The club also won 1985 Emperor's Cup. From 1988 to 1990, the club won all three major title in Japan; Japan Soccer League, JSL Cup and Emperor's Cup for 2 years in a row. In 1990s, the club won 1990 JSL Cup, 1991 Emperor's Cup and 1992 Emperor's Cup. In Asia, the club won 1991–92 Asian Cup Winners' Cup.

When Japan's first-ever professional league J1 League started in 1993, Nissan Motors was transformed to Yokohama Marinos for whom he continued to play. The club won 1992 Emperor's Cup and 1992–93 Asian Cup Winners' Cup. After he lost his position to young Yoshikatsu Kawaguchi who would also replace him as the first-choice goalkeeper in the national team, he moved to Japan Football League (JFL) side Tosu Futures in 1995. He moved to fellow JFL side Brummell Sendai in 1997. He came back to J1 League to play for Kyoto Purple Sanga in 1998 and spent 3 seasons there before he retired in 2000.

== National team career ==
Matsunaga was capped 40 times for Japan national team between 1988 and 1995. He was the first-choice GK when Japan won the 1992 Asian Cup. However, he was sent off for retaliation in the semi-final against China and Kazuya Maekawa filled in for him for the rest of the competition. He was also tending the goal when Japan's hope to play in the 1994 World Cup finals was dashed by a late Iraqi equaliser in the 1994 World Cup qualification final qualifier, the match that the Japanese fans now refer to as the Agony of Doha.

== Coaching career ==
After retiring from the game, Matsunaga served as a goalkeeping coach for Kyoto Purple Sanga from 2001 to 2006. He is now a goalkeeping coach for Yokohama F. Marinos.

== Club statistics ==
Club performance			League		Cup		League Cup		Total	
Season	Club	League	Apps	Goals	Apps	Goals	Apps	Goals	Apps	Goals
Japan			League		Emperor's Cup		J.League Cup		Total	
1985/86	Nissan Motors	JSL Division 1	15	0					15	0
1986/87	Nissan Motors	JSL Division 1	22	0					22	0
1987/88	Nissan Motors	JSL Division 1	22	0					22	0
1988/89	Nissan Motors	JSL Division 1	21	0					21	0
1989/90	Nissan Motors	JSL Division 1	22	0			4	0	26	0
1990/91	Nissan Motors	JSL Division 1	22	0			4	0	26	0
1991/92	Nissan Motors	JSL Division 1	21	0			3	0	24	0
1992	Yokohama Marinos	J1 League	-		4	0	9	0	13	0
1993	Yokohama Marinos	J1 League	36	0	3	0	0	0	39	0
1994	Yokohama Marinos	J1 League	43	0	4	0	3	0	50	0
1995	Yokohama Marinos	J1 League	10	0	0	0	-		10	0
1995	Tosu Futures	Football League	24	0	1	0	-		25	0
1996	Tosu Futures	Football League	30	0	3	0	-		33	0
1997	Brummell Sendai	Football League	15	0	0	0	6	0	21	0
1997	Kyoto Purple Sanga	J1 League	6	0	0	0	0	0	6	0
1998	Kyoto Purple Sanga	J1 League	34	0	2	0	4	0	40	0
1999	Kyoto Purple Sanga	J1 League	30	0	2	0	3	1	35	1
2000	Kyoto Purple Sanga	J1 League	15	0	0	0	0	0	15	0
Total			488	0	19	0	36	1	543	1

== National team statistics ==
Japan national team
Year	Apps	Goals
1988	1	0
1989	9	0
1990	0	0
1991	1	0
1992	9	0
1993	14	0
1994	0	0
1995	6	0
Total	40	0

== Personal honours ==
- J.League Best XI – 1993
- J.League Meritoriousness Player Award – 2000

== Team honours ==
National Team

- AFC Asian Cup – 1992

Nissan Motors / Yokohama Marinos

- Asian Cup Winners' Cup – 1991/92, 1992/93
- Japan Soccer League Division 1 – 1988/89, 1989/90
- Emperor's Cup – 1985, 1988, 1989, 1991, 1992
- JSL Cup – 1988, 1989, 1990
