= Tetsuji Hashiratani =

Japanese footballer and manager

Tetsuji Hashiratani 柱谷 哲二
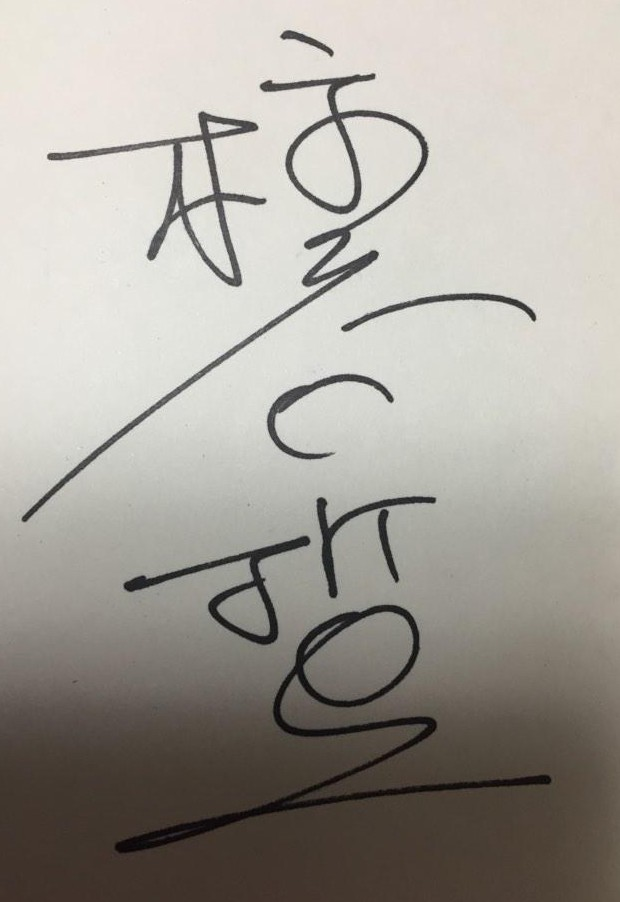
- Autograph

Personal information
- Full name: Tetsuji Hashiratani
- Date of birth: July 15, 1964 (age 62)
- Place of birth: Kyoto, Kyoto, Japan
- Height: 1.82 m (6 ft 0 in)
- Position: Defender

Youth career
- 1980–1982: Kyoto Shogyo High School

College career
Years	Team	Apps	(Gls)
1983–1986	Kokushikan University		

Senior career*
Years	Team	Apps	(Gls)
1987–1992	Nissan Motors	97	(2)
1992–1998	Verdy Kawasaki	183	(13)
Total		280	(15)

International career
1988–1995	Japan	72	(6)

Managerial career
- 2002: Consadole Sapporo
- 2008: Tokyo Verdy
- 2011–2015: Mito HollyHock
- 2016: Gainare Tottori
- 2017: Vanraure Hachinohe
- 2018: Giravanz Kitakyushu
Medal record
Nissan Motors
Winner	Japan Soccer League	1988/89
Winner	Japan Soccer League	1989/90
Runner-up	Japan Soccer League	1990/91
Runner-up	Japan Soccer League	1991/92
Winner	JSL Cup	1988
Winner	JSL Cup	1989
Winner	JSL Cup	1990
Winner	Emperor's Cup	1988
Winner	Emperor's Cup	1989
Winner	Emperor's Cup	1991
Runner-up	Emperor's Cup	1990
Verdy Kawasaki
Winner	J1 League	1993
Winner	J1 League	1994
Runner-up	J1 League	1995
Winner	J.League Cup	1992
Winner	J.League Cup	1993
Winner	J.League Cup	1994
Runner-up	J.League Cup	1996
Winner	Emperor's Cup	1996
Runner-up	Emperor's Cup	1992
Representing Japan
AFC Asian Cup
Gold medal – first place	1992 Japan
- * Club domestic league appearances and goals

Tetsuji Hashiratani (柱谷 哲二, Hashiratani Tetsuji; born July 15, 1964) is a former Japanese football player and manager. He played for Japan national team. His elder brother Koichi Hashiratani is also a former footballer.

== Club career ==
Hashiratani was educated at and played for Kyoto Commercial High School and Kokushikan University. He played as defender and defensive midfielder. He joined Japan Soccer League side Nissan Motors in 1987. From 1988 to 1990, the club won all three major title in Japan; Japan Soccer League, JSL Cup and Emperor's Cup for 2 years in a row. In 1990s, the club won 1990 JSL Cup, 1991 and 1992 Emperor's Cup. In Asia, the club won 1991–92 Asian Cup Winners' Cup. He moved to Verdy Kawasaki in 1992 when professional league J1 League was founded. The club won the league champions in 1993 and 1994. The club also won 1992, 1993, 1994 J.League Cup and 1996 Emperor's Cup. He was a central player in golden era in both clubs history. He retired in 1998. He was selected Best Eleven for 6 years in a row (1989/90-1995).

He was the first chairman of the J.League Pro-Footballers Association (JPFA).

== National team career ==
Hashiratani was capped 72 times and scored 6 goals for the Japan national team from 1988 to 1995. He was a member of the Japan team for the 1992 Asian Cup which Japan won. He was the captain when Japan's hope to play in the 1994 World Cup finals was dashed by a late Iraqi equaliser in the final qualifier, the match that the Japanese fans now refer to as the Agony of Doha.

== Coaching career ==
He succeeded Takeshi Okada as the manager of Consadole Sapporo at the beginning of the 2002 season. However, he was sacked after only seven matches. The club was relegated to J2 League that season. Then he coached Kokushikan University and Urawa Reds. He was a coach at Tokyo Verdy from 2006 to 2007. He was promoted to the manager of the club in 2008 but fired by the Verdy after the season. He would later return in 2010 to coach Kokushikan University. He was called back to professional managing once more, as he was announced to lead Mito HollyHock from the 2011 season. After poor results leaving Mito in the relegation zone, he was sacked in the middle of the 2015 season. He was signed to manage J3 League-team Gainare Tottori from the 2016 season, but he lasted only season before signing for JFL's Vanraure Hachinohe. He resigned end of 2017 season. He signed with Giravanz Kitakyushu as Hitoshi Morishita successor in June 2018. The club finished the 2018 season at bottom place of 17 club and he resigned at the end of the 2018 season.

== Club statistics ==
Club performance			League		Cup		League Cup		Total	
Season	Club	League	Apps	Goals	Apps	Goals	Apps	Goals	Apps	Goals
Japan			League		Emperor's Cup		J.League Cup		Total	
1987/88	Nissan Motors	JSL Division 1	12	0					12	0
1988/89	Nissan Motors	JSL Division 1	22	0					22	0
1989/90	Nissan Motors	JSL Division 1	21	2			4	0	25	2
1990/91	Nissan Motors	JSL Division 1	20	0			4	0	24	0
1991/92	Nissan Motors	JSL Division 1	22	0			3	0	25	0
1992	Verdy Kawasaki	J1 League	-		5	0	11	0	16	0
1993	Verdy Kawasaki	J1 League	31	3	2	0	1	0	34	3
1994	Verdy Kawasaki	J1 League	40	2	2	0	3	0	45	2
1995	Verdy Kawasaki	J1 League	46	5	2	0	-		48	5
1996	Verdy Kawasaki	J1 League	22	2	0	0	10	0	32	2
1997	Verdy Kawasaki	J1 League	16	0	2	0	3	0	21	0
1998	Verdy Kawasaki	J1 League	28	1	3	0	2	0	33	1
Total			280	15	16	0	41	0	341	11

== National team statistics ==
Japan national team
Year	Apps	Goals
1988	5	1
1989	10	0
1990	6	1
1991	2	1
1992	11	0
1993	14	2
1994	9	1
1995	15	0
Total	72	6

== Managerial statistics ==
Team	From	To	Record				
Team	From	To	G	W	D	L	Win %
Consadole Sapporo	2002	2002	13	2	4	7	15.38
Tokyo Verdy	2008	2008	40	10	10	20	25.00
Mito HollyHock	2011	2015	181	55	51	75	30.39
Gainare Tottori	2016	2016	30	8	6	16	26.67
Giravanz Kitakyushu	2018	2018	19	4	7	8	21.05
Total			253	71	70	112	28.06

== Honors and awards ==
=== Individual Honors ===
- Japan Soccer League Most Valuable Player: 1988-89
- J1 League Best Eleven: 1993, 1994, 1995

=== Team Honors ===
- 1992 Asian Cup (Champions)
