= Hiroshi Hirakawa =

Japanese footballer

Hiroshi Hirakawa 平川 弘
Personal information
- Full name: Hiroshi Hirakawa
- Date of birth: January 10, 1965 (age 61)
- Place of birth: Kanagawa, Japan
- Height: 1.80 m (5 ft 11 in)
- Positions: Defender; midfielder

Youth career
- 1980–1982: Chigasaki High School
- 1983–1986: Juntendo University

Senior career*
Years	Team	Apps	(Gls)
1987–1994	Yokohama Marinos	110	(4)
1995	Yokohama Flügels	13	(1)
1996	Consadole Sapporo	5	(0)
Total		128	(5)

International career
1985–1992	Japan	13	(0)
Medal record
Yokohama Marinos
Winner	Japan Soccer League	1988/89
Winner	Japan Soccer League	1989/90
Runner-up	Japan Soccer League	1990/91
Runner-up	Japan Soccer League	1991/92
Winner	JSL Cup	1988
Winner	JSL Cup	1989
Winner	JSL Cup	1990
Winner	Emperor's Cup	1988
Winner	Emperor's Cup	1989
Winner	Emperor's Cup	1991
Winner	Emperor's Cup	1992
Runner-up	Emperor's Cup	1990
- * Club domestic league appearances and goals

Hiroshi Hirakawa (平川 弘, Hirakawa Hiroshi; born January 10, 1965) is a former Japanese football player. He played for the Japan national team.

== Club career ==
Hirakawa was born in Kanagawa Prefecture on January 10, 1965. After graduating from Juntendo University, he joined Nissan Motors (later Yokohama Marinos) in 1987. From 1988 to 1990, the club won all three major title in Japan; Japan Soccer League, JSL Cup and Emperor's Cup for two consecutive seasons. During the 1990s, the club won the 1990 JSL Cup, 1991 and 1992 Emperor's Cup. In Asia, the club won the 1991–92 and 1992–93 Asian Cup Winners' Cups. Toward the end of his career, he played for Yokohama Flügels in 1995 and Consadole Sapporo in 1996. He retired in 1996.

== National team career ==
In March 1985, Hirakawa was selected Japan national team for 1986 World Cup qualification. At this qualification, on March 21, he debuted against North Korea. After he joined Nissan Motors, he was selected Japan again in 1988 and 1989. In 1992, he also played 1 game for the first time in 3 years. He played 13 games for Japan until 1992.

== Club statistics ==
Club performance			League		Cup		League Cup		Total	
Season	Club	League	Apps	Goals	Apps	Goals	Apps	Goals	Apps	Goals
Japan			League		Emperor's Cup		J.League Cup		Total	
1987/88	Nissan Motors	JSL Division 1	20	1					20	1
1988/89	Nissan Motors	JSL Division 1	12	1					12	1
1989/90	Nissan Motors	JSL Division 1	14	0			4	0	18	0
1990/91	Nissan Motors	JSL Division 1	0	0			0	0	0	0
1991/92	Nissan Motors	JSL Division 1	22	0			3	1	25	1
1992	Yokohama Marinos	J1 League	-		0	0	9	1	9	1
1993	Yokohama Marinos	J1 League	31	2	3	0	5	0	39	2
1994	Yokohama Marinos	J1 League	11	0	0	0	0	0	11	0
1995	Yokohama Flügels	J1 League	13	1	0	0	-		13	1
1996	Consadole Sapporo	Football League	5	0	0	0	-		5	0
Total			128	5	3	0	21	2	152	7

== National team statistics ==
Japan national team
Year	Apps	Goals
1985	6	0
1986	0	0
1987	0	0
1988	4	0
1989	2	0
1990	0	0
1991	0	0
1992	1	0
Total	13	0
