= Takashi Mizunuma =

Japanese footballer and manager

Takashi Mizunuma 水沼 貴史
Personal information
- Full name: Takashi Mizunuma
- Date of birth: May 28, 1960 (age 66)
- Place of birth: Saitama, Saitama, Japan
- Height: 1.76 m (5 ft 9 in)
- Position: Winger

Youth career
- 1976–1978: Saitama Urawa Minami High School
- 1979–1982: Hosei University

Senior career*
Years	Team	Apps	(Gls)
1983–1995	Yokohama Marinos	203	(38)
Total		208	(38)

International career
1979	Japan U-20	3	(1)
1984–1989	Japan	32	(7)

Managerial career
- 2006: Yokohama F. Marinos
Medal record
Nissan Motors / Yokohama Marinos
Winner	Japan Soccer League	1988/89
Winner	Japan Soccer League	1989/90
Runner-up	Japan Soccer League	1983
Runner-up	Japan Soccer League	1984
Runner-up	Japan Soccer League	1990/91
Runner-up	Japan Soccer League	1991/92
Winner	J1 League	1995
Winner	JSL Cup	1988
Winner	JSL Cup	1989
Winner	JSL Cup	1990
Runner-up	JSL Cup	1983
Runner-up	JSL Cup	1985
Runner-up	JSL Cup	1986
Winner	Emperor's Cup	1983
Winner	Emperor's Cup	1985
Winner	Emperor's Cup	1988
Winner	Emperor's Cup	1989
Winner	Emperor's Cup	1991
Winner	Emperor's Cup	1992
Runner-up	Emperor's Cup	1990
- * Club domestic league appearances and goals

Takashi Mizunuma (水沼 貴史, Mizunuma Takashi; born May 28, 1960) is a former Japanese football player and manager and football commentator. He played for Japan national team. His son Kota Mizunuma is also a footballer.

== Club career ==
Mizunuma was born in Saitama on May 28, 1960. After graduating from Hosei University, he joined Nissan Motors (later Yokohama Marinos) in 1983. The club won 1983 and 1985 Emperor's Cup. From 1988 to 1990, the club won all three major title in Japan; Japan Soccer League, JSL Cup and Emperor's Cup for 2 years in a row. In 1990s, the club won 1990 JSL Cup, 1991 and 1992 Emperor's Cup. In Asia, the club won 1991–92 and 1992–93 Asian Cup Winners' Cup. In 1995 season, he retired after he played in opening game.

== National team career ==
In August 1979, when Mizunuma was a Hosei University student, he was selected Japan U-20 national team for 1979 World Youth Championship. He played all 3 matches and scored a goal against Mexico. This goal is an only goal in Japan team at this championship.

In April 1984, Mizunuma was selected Japan national team for 1984 Summer Olympics qualification. At this qualification, on April 18, he debuted against Malaysia. He also played at 1986 World Cup qualification, 1988 Summer Olympics qualification and 1990 World Cup qualification. He played 32 games and scored 7 goals for Japan until 1989.

== Coaching career ==
In 2006, Mizunuma became an assistant coach for Yokohama F. Marinos. In August, he became a manager as Takeshi Okada successor and managed the club this season. In 2007, he resigned a manager and returned an assistant coach. He left the club end of 2007 season.

== After retirement ==
Between 1996 and January 2006, he appeared as a pundit on TBS show "Super Soccer" (where he had a guest appearance on the second broadcast, which was a player in activity). He was also in charge of JNN News no Mori's "World Soccer Paradise" section every Monday, and also appeared as a Monday commentator on the daytime variety show "Just". He was a soccer commentator for NBS on TV Kanagawa, and also a personality for "Kickoff !! F. Marinos" on TV Kanagawa until January 2006. He was also in charge of TBS Radio "Takashi Mizunuma no Sports Bomber!" between October 2002 and March 2003. Between 2003 and 2005, he coached his juniors as Hosei University coach at his alma mater. He also obtained an S-class license in 2004.

With a one-year contract from 1 February 2006 to 31 January 2007, he became the coach of Yokohama F. Marinos. Along with that, both"Super Soccer" and "Kick-off !! F. Marinos" shows were taken off the air. Furthermore, on 24 August 2006, he was appointed as a coach after Takeshi Okada resigned due to poor results. Although his team was prevented from being demoted to J2, he continued to be sluggish due to his inauguration without a concrete strategy, and decided to resign after the Emperor's Cup. In 2007, he became the coach of Yokohama F. Marinos again, but retired in one year. Mizunuma was the first former player from Marinos to become the coach of Yokohama F. Marinos.

In February 2008, it was announced that he would be reappointed as coach of the Hosei University Athletic Association Soccer Club.

In February 2010, he was a technical advisor to Tokyo 23 FC.

In addition, he wrote soccer commentary on sports channels such as SKY PerfecTV!, J Sports and wrote a column "Shūkyū 7 Days" every Saturday and Sunday on Yukan Fuji, and wrote "Mizunuma Takashi no Nice Middle!" on NumberWeb.

On January 22, 2012, he was elected as the director of Yokohama F. Marinos Old Boys at the Naoki Matsuda Memorial Game.

== Career statistics ==
=== Club ===
Club performance			League		Emperor's Cup		J.League Cup		Total	
Season	Club	League	Apps	Goals	Apps	Goals	Apps	Goals	Apps	Goals
Japan			League		Emperor's Cup		J.League Cup		Total	
1983	Nissan Motors	JSL Division 1	12	3					12	3
1984	Nissan Motors	JSL Division 1	17	8					17	8
1985/86	Nissan Motors	JSL Division 1	22	3					22	3
1986/87	Nissan Motors	JSL Division 1	22	3					22	3
1987/88	Nissan Motors	JSL Division 1	22	7					22	7
1988/89	Nissan Motors	JSL Division 1	20	4					20	4
1989/90	Nissan Motors	JSL Division 1	16	2			4	2	20	4
1990/91	Nissan Motors	JSL Division 1	10	1			4	0	14	1
1991/92	Nissan Motors	JSL Division 1	20	2			3	0	23	2
1992	Yokohama Marinos	J1 League	-		4	3	3	0	7	3
1993	Yokohama Marinos	J1 League	26	3	3	2	3	0	32	5
1994	Yokohama Marinos	J1 League	15	2	1	0	1	0	17	2
1995	Yokohama Marinos	J1 League	1	0	0	0	-		1	0
Total			203	38	8	5	18	2	229	45

=== International ===
Japan national team
Year	Apps	Goals
1984	5	1
1985	8	3
1986	0	0
1987	8	2
1988	3	0
1989	8	1
Total	32	7

== Managerial statistics ==
Team	From	To	Record				
Team	From	To	G	W	D	L	Win %
Yokohama F. Marinos	2006	2006	15	7	1	7	46.67
Total			15	7	1	7	46.67
