= Kazushi Kimura =

Japanese footballer and manager

Kazushi Kimura 木村 和司
Personal information
- Full name: Kazushi Kimura
- Date of birth: July 19, 1958 (age 68)
- Place of birth: Hiroshima, Hiroshima, Japan
- Height: 1.68 m (5 ft 6 in)
- Position: Midfielder

Youth career
- 1974–1976: Hiroshima Kogyo High School

College career
Years	Team	Apps	(Gls)
1977–1980	Meiji University		

Senior career*
Years	Team	Apps	(Gls)
1981–1994	Yokohama Marinos	233	(51)
Total		233	(51)

International career
1979–1986	Japan	54	(26)

Managerial career
- 2010–2011: Yokohama F. Marinos
Medal record
Nissan Motors / Yokohama Marinos
Winner	Japan Soccer League	1988/89
Winner	Japan Soccer League	1989/90
Runner-up	Japan Soccer League	1983
Runner-up	Japan Soccer League	1984
Runner-up	Japan Soccer League	1990/91
Runner-up	Japan Soccer League	1991/92
Winner	JSL Cup	1988
Winner	JSL Cup	1989
Winner	JSL Cup	1990
Runner-up	JSL Cup	1983
Runner-up	JSL Cup	1985
Runner-up	JSL Cup	1986
Winner	Emperor's Cup	1983
Winner	Emperor's Cup	1985
Winner	Emperor's Cup	1988
Winner	Emperor's Cup	1989
Winner	Emperor's Cup	1991
Winner	Emperor's Cup	1992
Runner-up	Emperor's Cup	1990
- * Club domestic league appearances and goals

Kazushi Kimura (木村 和司, Kimura Kazushi; born July 19, 1958) is a former Japanese football player and manager. He played for Japan national team.

== Club career ==
Kimura was born in Hiroshima on July 19, 1958. After graduating from Meiji University, he joined Nissan Motors (later Yokohama Marinos) in 1981. From 1982, he wore the number 10 shirt. He was selected Japanese Footballer of the Year awards in 1983 and 1984. The club also won 1983 and 1985 Emperor's Cup. From 1988 to 1990, the club won all three major title in Japan; Japan Soccer League, JSL Cup and Emperor's Cup for 2 years in a row. He was also selected Japanese Footballer of the Year awards again 1989. In 1990s, the club won 1990 JSL Cup, 1991 and 1992 Emperor's Cup. In Asia, the club won 1991–92 and 1992–93 Asian Cup Winners' Cup. He was a central player in golden era in club history. He retired in 1994. He played 251 games and scored 51 goals in the league. He was selected Japanese Footballer of the Year awards 3times and Best Eleven 5 times.

== National team career ==
On May 31, 1979, when Kimura was a Meiji University student, he debuted for Japan national team against Indonesia. He played at 1980 Summer Olympics qualification and 1982 World Cup qualification. From 1982, he played in all matches of Japan national team included 1982, 1986 Asian Games, 1984 Summer Olympics qualification and 1986 World Cup qualification. In 1985, he scored goals in six consecutive games. This is a record of continuous score in Japan national team. He played 54 games and scored 26 goals for Japan until 1986.

== Coaching career ==
Kimura became a manager for Yokohama F. Marinos in 2010. In 2011, although the club compete for the champions till half way, the club stalled in the late stages and finished 5th place. He was sacked end of 2011 season.

== Club statistics ==
Club performance			League		Cup		League Cup		Total	
Season	Club	League	Apps	Goals	Apps	Goals	Apps	Goals	Apps	Goals
Japan			League		Emperor's Cup		J.League Cup		Total	
1981	Nissan Motors	JSL Division 2	18	6	2	0	2	2	22	8
1982	Nissan Motors	JSL Division 1	18	0	2	2	0	0	20	2
1983	Nissan Motors	JSL Division 1	18	5	5	2	4	6	27	13
1984	Nissan Motors	JSL Division 1	17	8	4	2	0	0	21	10
1985/86	Nissan Motors	JSL Division 1	21	6	4	3	4	3	29	12
1986/87	Nissan Motors	JSL Division 1	20	2	4	1	5	1	29	4
1987/88	Nissan Motors	JSL Division 1	14	1	3	1	1	0	18	2
1988/89	Nissan Motors	JSL Division 1	22	8	5	1	5	4	32	13
1989/90	Nissan Motors	JSL Division 1	22	8	5	0	4	1	31	5
1990/91	Nissan Motors	JSL Division 1	10	3	4	2	4	2	18	7
1991/92	Nissan Motors	JSL Division 1	22	3	5	1	3	1	30	5
1992	Yokohama Marinos	J1 League	-		4	3	9	0	13	3
1993	Yokohama Marinos	J1 League	21	1	0	0	2	0	23	1
1994	Yokohama Marinos	J1 League	10	0	4	1	3	0	17	1
Total			251	51	51	22	46	20	348	93

== National team statistics ==
Japan national team
Year	Apps	Goals
1979	3	0
1980	9	4
1981	1	0
1982	8	1
1983	10	8
1984	7	4
1985	10	7
1986	6	2
Total	54	26

== International goals ==
No.	Date	Venue	Opponent	Score	Result	Competition
4.	28 December 1980	Causeway Bay, Hong Kong	Macau	1–0	3–0	1982 FIFA World Cup qualification
5.	21 November 1982	New Delhi, India	Iran	1–0	1–0	1982 Asian Games
6.	4 September 1983	Tokyo, Japan	Philippines	2–0	7–0	1984 Summer Olympics Qualifiers
7.	4 September 1983	Tokyo, Japan	Philippines	6–0	7–0	1984 Summer Olympics Qualifiers
8.	7 September 1983	Tokyo, Japan	Philippines	3–0	10–1	1984 Summer Olympics Qualifiers
9.	7 September 1983	Tokyo, Japan	Philippines	5–1	10–1	1984 Summer Olympics Qualifiers
10.	7 September 1983	Tokyo, Japan	Philippines	8–1	10–1	1984 Summer Olympics Qualifiers
11.	7 September 1983	Tokyo, Japan	Philippines	9–1	10–1	1984 Summer Olympics Qualifiers
12.	7 September 1983	Tokyo, Japan	Philippines	10–1	10–1	1984 Summer Olympics Qualifiers
13.	15 September 1983	Tokyo, Japan	Chinese Taipei	2–0	2–0	1984 Summer Olympics Qualifiers
14.	15 April 1984	Kallang, Singapore	Thailand	2–5	2–5	1984 Summer Olympics Qualifiers
18.	23 February 1985	Kallang, Singapore	Singapore	1–0	3–1	1986 FIFA World Cup qualification
19.	18 May 1985	Tokyo, Japan	Singapore	5–0	5–0	1986 FIFA World Cup qualification
20.	26 May 1985	Tokyo, Japan	Uruguay	1–?	1–4	Friendly
21.	4 June 1985	Nagoya, Japan	Malaysia	3–0	3–0	Friendly
22.	11 August 1985	Kobe, Japan	Hong Kong	1–0	3–0	1986 FIFA World Cup qualification
23.	22 September 1985	Causeway Bay, Hong Kong	Hong Kong	1–0	2–1	1986 FIFA World Cup qualification
24.	26 October 1985	Tokyo, Japan	South Korea	1–2	1–2	1986 FIFA World Cup qualification
25.	20 September 1986	Daejeon, South Korea	Nepal	3–0	5–0	1986 Asian Games
26.	20 September 1986	Daejeon, South Korea	Nepal	4–0	5–0	1986 Asian Games

== Managerial statistics ==
Team	From	To	Record				
Team	From	To	G	W	D	L	Win %
Yokohama F. Marinos	2010	2011	68	31	14	23	45.59
Total			68	31	14	23	45.59

== Honours and awards ==
=== Team ===
- Japan Soccer League Champions: 1988–89, 1989–90
- JSL Cup Champions: 1988, 1989, 1990
- Emperor's Cup Champions: 1983, 1985, 1988, 1989, 1991, 1992
- Asian Cup Winners' Cup Champions: 1991–92, 1992–93

=== Awards ===
- Japanese Football Player of the Year: 1983, 1984, 1989
- Japan Soccer League Most Valuable Player: 1989-90
- Japan Soccer League Best Eleven (5): 1983, 1984, 1985–86, 1988–89, 1989–90
- Japan Soccer League Assists leader: 1984
- Japan Football Hall of Fame: Inducted in 2020
