= Kunio Nagayama =

Japanese footballer

Kunio Nagayama 永山 邦夫
Personal information
- Full name: Kunio Nagayama
- Date of birth: 16 September 1970 (age 56)
- Place of birth: Kanagawa, Japan
- Height: 1.71 m (5 ft 7 1/2 in)
- Position: Midfielder

Youth career
- 1986–1988: Nissan Motors

Senior career*
Years	Team	Apps	(Gls)
1989–2003	Yokohama F. Marinos	196	(8)
Total		196	(8)
Medal record
Nissan Motors / Yokohama Marinos / Yokohama F. Marinos
Winner	Japan Soccer League	1989/90
Runner-up	Japan Soccer League	1990/91
Runner-up	Japan Soccer League	1991/92
Winner	J1 League	1995
Winner	J1 League	2003
Runner-up	J1 League	2000
Runner-up	J1 League	2002
Winner	JSL Cup	1989
Winner	JSL Cup	1990
Winner	J.League Cup	2001
Winner	Emperor's Cup	1989
Winner	Emperor's Cup	1991
Winner	Emperor's Cup	1992
Runner-up	Emperor's Cup	1990
- * Club domestic league appearances and goals

Kunio Nagayama (永山 邦夫, Nagayama Kunio; born 16 September 1970) is a former Japanese football player.

== Playing career ==
Nagayama was born in Kanagawa Prefecture on 16 September 1970. He joined Nissan Motors (later Yokohama Marinos) from youth team in 1989. He played many matches as right side midfielder and right side back from first season and the club won the champions in all three major title in Japan; Japan Soccer League, JSL Cup and Emperor's Cup. In early 1999s, the club won 1990 JSL Cup, 1991 and 1992 Emperor's Cup. In Asia, the club also won the champions 1991–92 and 1992–93 Asian Cup Winners' Cup. In late 1990s, although the club won the champions 1995 J1 League, he got hurt and could not play at all in the match in 1995 and 1998. In 2000s, he played many matches and the club won the champions 2001 J.League Cup. In 2003, although his opportunity to play decreased, the club won the champions 2003 J1 League. He retired end of 2003 season.

== Club statistics ==
Club performance			League		Cup		League Cup		Total	
Season	Club	League	Apps	Goals	Apps	Goals	Apps	Goals	Apps	Goals
Japan			League		Emperor's Cup		J.League Cup		Total	
1989/90	Nissan Motors	JSL Division 1	10	1			0	0	10	1
1990/91	Nissan Motors	JSL Division 1	20	2			0	0	20	2
1991/92	Nissan Motors	JSL Division 1	13	0			3	0	16	0
1992	Yokohama Marinos	J1 League	-		4	0	5	0	9	0
1993	Yokohama Marinos	J1 League	16	0	2	0	5	0	23	0
1994	Yokohama Marinos	J1 League	22	0	0	0	0	0	22	0
1995	Yokohama Marinos	J1 League	0	0	0	0	-		0	0
1996	Yokohama Marinos	J1 League	16	0	1	0	8	1	25	1
1997	Yokohama Marinos	J1 League	18	1	2	0	2	0	22	1
1998	Yokohama Marinos	J1 League	0	0	0	0	0	0	0	0
1999	Yokohama F. Marinos	J1 League	11	1	2	0	4	0	17	1
2000	Yokohama F. Marinos	J1 League	24	2	1	1	6	0	31	3
2001	Yokohama F. Marinos	J1 League	20	1	1	0	9	0	30	1
2002	Yokohama F. Marinos	J1 League	18	0	2	0	6	0	26	0
2003	Yokohama F. Marinos	J1 League	8	0	0	0	5	0	13	0
Total			196	8	15	1	53	1	264	10
