= Rikizo Matsuhashi =

Japanese footballer

Rikizo Matsuhashi 松橋 力蔵
Personal information
- Full name: Rikizo Matsuhashi
- Date of birth: 22 August 1968 (age 58)
- Place of birth: Tokyo, Japan
- Height: 1.73 m (5 ft 8 in)
- Position: Midfielder

Team information
- Current team: FC Tokyo (head coach)

Youth career
- 1984–1986: Ichihara Midori High School

Senior career*
Years	Team	Apps	(Gls)
1989–1995	Yokohama F. Marinos	40	(0)
1996–1997	Kyoto Purple Sanga	27	(3)
1998–2001	Jatco TT	79	(15)
Total		146	(18)

Managerial career
- 2006–2008: Yokohama F. Marinos U18 (assistant)
- 2008–2009: Yokohama F. Marinos (assistant)
- 2009–2014: Yokohama F. Marinos U18
- 2014–2015: Yokohama F. Marinos U18 (assistant)
- 2015–2017: Yokohama F. Marinos U18
- 2017–2021: Yokohama F. Marinos (assistant)
- 2021–2022: Albirex Niigata (assistant)
- 2022–2025: Albirex Niigata
- 2025–: FC Tokyo
Medal record
Yokohama Marinos
Winner	Japan Soccer League	1989/90
Runner-up	Japan Soccer League	1990/91
Runner-up	Japan Soccer League	1991/92
Winner	J1 League	1995
Winner	JSL Cup	1989
Winner	JSL Cup	1990
Winner	Emperor's Cup	1989
Winner	Emperor's Cup	1991
Winner	Emperor's Cup	1992
Runner-up	Emperor's Cup	1990
- * Club domestic league appearances and goals

Rikizo Matsuhashi (松橋 力蔵, Matsuhashi Rikizo; born August 22, 1968) is a Japanese football manager and former football player who is the currently head coach of J1 League side FC Tokyo.

== Playing career ==
Matsuhashi was born in Tokyo on August 22, 1968. After graduating from high school, he joined Nissan Motors (later Yokohama Marinos) in 1989. Although he played as midfielder, he could not become a regular player. In 1996, he moved to newly was promoted to J1 League club, Kyoto Purple Sanga and he played many matches. In 1998, he moved to Japan Football League club Jatco (later Jatco TT). From 1999, the club joined new league Japan Football League. He retired end of 2001 season.

== Managerial career ==
On 6 December 2021, Matsuhashi was announced as the successor to Albert Puig in the dugout for Albirex Niigata.On 23 October 2022, Matsuhashi brought his club to promotion to the J1 League next season as well as the J2 League champions for the 2022 season. He left from the club as manager in 2024 after two years at Albirex Niigata.

On 21 December 2024, Matsuhashi announcement officially manager of FC Tokyo from 2025 season.

== Career statistics ==
Appearances and goals by club, season and competition
Club	Season	League			Emperor's Cup		J.League Cup		Total	
Club	Season	Division	Apps	Goals	Apps	Goals	Apps	Goals	Apps	Goals
Yokohama Marinos	1992	J1 League	-		2	2	6	0	8	2
Yokohama Marinos	1993	J1 League	3	0	0	0	2	0	5	0
Yokohama Marinos	1994	J1 League	8	0	0	0	0	0	8	0
Yokohama Marinos	1995	J1 League	6	0	1	0	-		7	0
Kyoto Purple Sanga	1996	J1 League	17	3	0	0	10	1	27	4
Kyoto Purple Sanga	1997	J1 League	10	0	0	0	0	0	10	0
Jatco	1998	JFL (1992-98)	22	3	-		-		22	3
Jatco	1999	JFL	23	6	2	1	-		25	7
Jatco TT	2000	JFL	22	6	3	1	-		25	7
Jatco TT	2001	JFL	12	0	0	0	-		12	0
Career total			123	18	8	4	18	1	149	23

== Managerial statistics ==
As of match played 6 June 2026

Managerial record by team and tenure
Team	Nat.	From	To	Record								Ref.
Team	Nat.	From	To	G	W	D	L	GF	GA	GD	Win %	Ref.
Albirex Niigata	(Japan)	1 February 2022	31 January 2025	136	57	37	42	194	169	+25	41.91	
FC Tokyo	(Japan)	1 February 2025	Present	66	28	18	20	85	76	+9	42.42	
Career Total				202	85	55	62	279	245	+34	42.08	

== Honours ==
=== Manager ===
Albirex Niigata

- J2 League Champions : 2022
