= Takuya Jinno =

Japanese footballer and manager

Takuya Jinno 神野 卓哉
Personal information
- Full name: Takuya Jinno
- Date of birth: June 1, 1970 (age 56)
- Place of birth: Soka, Saitama, Japan
- Height: 1.80 m (5 ft 11 in)
- Position: Forward

Youth career
- 1986–1988: Shutoku High School

Senior career*
Years	Team	Apps	(Gls)
1989–1995	Yokohama Marinos	113	(12)
1996–1998	Vissel Kobe	87	(13)
1999	Oita Trinita	36	(19)
2000	FC Tokyo	18	(4)
2001	Oita Trinita	9	(0)
2001–2003	Yokohama FC	75	(16)
Total		338	(64)

Managerial career
- 2017–2020: NHK Spring Yokohama FC; Seagulls
- 2024: Iwate Grulla Morioka
Medal record
Yokohama Marinos
Winner	Japan Soccer League	1989/90
Runner-up	Japan Soccer League	1990/91
Runner-up	Japan Soccer League	1991/92
Winner	J1 League	1995
Winner	JSL Cup	1989
Winner	JSL Cup	1990
Winner	Emperor's Cup	1989
Winner	Emperor's Cup	1991
Winner	Emperor's Cup	1992
Runner-up	Emperor's Cup	1990
Representing Japan
AFC Asian Cup
Gold medal – first place	1992 Japan
- * Club domestic league appearances and goals

Takuya Jinno (神野 卓哉, Jinno Takuya; born June 1, 1970) is a Japanese football manager and former player who was most recently manager of J3 League club Iwate Grulla Morioka.

== Club career ==
Jinno was born in Soka on June 1, 1970. He was educated at and played for Shutoku High School. After graduating in 1989, he joined Japan Soccer League side Nissan Motors. When Japan's first-ever professional league J1 League started in 1993, Nissan Motors was transformed to Yokohama Marinos for whom he continued to play.

He moved to Japan Football League side Vissel Kobe in 1996 and helped them to gain the promotion to J1 League. In 1999, he was transferred to J2 League side Oita Trinita where he scored the most goals in the league for the season. He played the 2000 season for FC Tokyo. He briefly played for Oita again in the early stage of the 2001 season before he moved to Yokohama FC where he retired from the game in 2003.

== National team career ==
Jinno was a member of the Japan national team that won the 1992 Asian Cup but he was never capped.

== Coaching career ==
Jinno remained at Yokohama FC after the retirement and has been working in the area of development for the club until 2009. After 2011, he worked for Gainare Tottori (2011), Avispa Fukuoka (2012–14) and AC Nagano Parceiro (2015–16). In June 2017, he signed with L.League club NHK Spring Yokohama FC Seagulls and became a manager.

=== Iwate Grulla Morioka ===
In May 2024, he became manager of J3 League club Iwate Grulla Morioka following the dismissal of Tetsuji Nakamikawa. He was unable to improve the club's standings in the league, losing 8 of 11 league games and with the team rooted at the bottom of the table, Jinno was dismissed in September 2024.

== Club statistics ==
Club performance			League		Cup		League Cup		Total	
Season	Club	League	Apps	Goals	Apps	Goals	Apps	Goals	Apps	Goals
Japan			League		Emperor's Cup		J.League Cup		Total	
1989/90	Nissan Motors	JSL (Div. 1)	0	0			1	0	1	0
1990/91	Nissan Motors	JSL (Div. 1)	15	4			0	0	15	4
1991/92	Nissan Motors	JSL (Div. 1)	15	0			1	0	16	0
1992	Yokohama Marinos	J1 League	-		4	1	9	3	13	4
1993	Yokohama Marinos	J1 League	19	2	0	0	2	0	21	2
1994	Yokohama Marinos	J1 League	25	3	0	0	2	0	27	3
1995	Yokohama Marinos	J1 League	39	3	1	0	-		40	3
1996	Vissel Kobe	JFL	30	10	3	2	-		33	12
1997	Vissel Kobe	J1 League	29	1	2	0	6	0	37	1
1998	Vissel Kobe	J1 League	28	2	2	1	3	0	43	3
1999	Oita Trinita	J2 League	36	19	3	6	4	1	43	26
2000	FC Tokyo	J1 League	18	4	0	0	2	0	20	4
2001	Oita Trinita	J2 League	9	0	0	0	4	0	13	0
2001	Yokohama FC	J2 League	25	8	4	5	0	0	29	13
2002	Yokohama FC	J2 League	40	8	2	0	-		42	8
2003	Yokohama FC	J2 League	10	0	0	0	-		10	0
Total			338	64	21	15	34	4	393	83

== Team honours ==
=== Club ===
- Asian Cup Winners Cup – 1992
- Japan Soccer League Division 1/J1 League – 1990, 1995
- Emperor's Cup – 1989, 1991, 1992
- JSL Cup – 1989, 1990

=== National team ===
- AFC Asian Cup – 1992

== Personal honours ==
- J2 League Top Scorer – 1999
