= 1988 JSL Cup final =

Nissan Motors	Toshiba
3	0
- Date: September 11, 1988
- Venue: Yokkaichi Stadium, Mie

1988 JSL Cup final was the 13th final of the JSL Cup competition. The final was played at Yokkaichi Stadium in Mie on September 11, 1988. Nissan Motors won the championship.

== Overview ==
Nissan Motors won their 1st title, by defeating Toshiba 3–0 with Hiroshi Hirakawa and Takashi Mizunuma goal.

== Match details ==
September 11, 1988

Nissan Motors	3-0	Toshiba
Hiroshi Hirakawa 14'; Takashi Mizunuma 27', 36'

Yokkaichi Stadium

== See also ==
- 1988 JSL Cup
