= Satoru Noda (footballer) =

Japanese footballer

Satoru Noda 野田 知
Personal information
- Full name: Satoru Noda
- Date of birth: March 19, 1969 (age 57)
- Place of birth: Muroran, Hokkaido, Japan
- Height: 1.74 m (5 ft 8 1/2 in)
- Position: Midfielder

Youth career
- 1984–1986: Muroran Otani High School
- 1987–1990: Kokushikan University

Senior career*
Years	Team	Apps	(Gls)
1991–1998	Yokohama Marinos	197	(10)
1999–2002	Avispa Fukuoka	100	(4)
2003–2004	Volca Kagoshima		
Total		297	(14)

International career
1989	Japan Futsal		
Medal record
Yokohama Marinos
Runner-up	Japan Soccer League	1991/92
Winner	J1 League	1995
Winner	Emperor's Cup	1991
Winner	Emperor's Cup	1992
- * Club domestic league appearances and goals

Satoru Noda (野田 知, Noda Satoru; born March 19, 1969) is a Japanese former football player.

== Club career ==
Noda was born in Muroran on March 19, 1969. After graduating from Kokushikan University, he joined Nissan Motors (later Yokohama Marinos) in 1991. In 1992, he became a regular player as defensive midfielder. The club won the champions 1991, 1992 Emperor's Cup and 1995 J1 League. In Asia, the club won the champions 1991–92 and 1992–93 Asian Cup Winners' Cup. In 1999, he moved to Avispa Fukuoka. Although he played as regular player, the club was relegated to J2 League in 2002. In 2002, his opportunity to play decreased and he moved to Regional Leagues club Volca Kagoshima in 2003. He retired end of 2004 season.

== National team career ==
In 1988, when Noda was a Kokushikan University student, he was selected Japan national "B team" for 1988 Asian Cup. At this competition, he played 1 game. However, Japan Football Association don't count as Japan national team match because this Japan team was "B team" not "top team"

== Futsal career ==
In 1989, Noda selected Japan national futsal team for 1989 Futsal World Championship in Netherlands.

== Club statistics ==
Club performance			League		Cup		League Cup		Total	
Season	Club	League	Apps	Goals	Apps	Goals	Apps	Goals	Apps	Goals
Japan			League		Emperor's Cup		J.League Cup		Total	
1990/91	Nissan Motors	JSL Division 1	1	0			0	0	1	0
1991/92	Nissan Motors	JSL Division 1	2	0			0	0	2	0
1992	Yokohama Marinos	J1 League	-		1	0	9	0	10	0
1993	Yokohama Marinos	J1 League	23	1	0	0	5	0	28	1
1994	Yokohama Marinos	J1 League	41	2	4	0	3	0	48	2
1995	Yokohama Marinos	J1 League	50	2	2	0	-		52	2
1996	Yokohama Marinos	J1 League	28	4	1	0	9	0	38	4
1997	Yokohama Marinos	J1 League	25	1	2	0	5	0	32	1
1998	Yokohama Marinos	J1 League	27	0	0	0	4	0	31	0
1999	Avispa Fukuoka	J1 League	27	2	2	0	3	0	32	2
2000	Avispa Fukuoka	J1 League	29	2	1	0	3	0	33	2
2001	Avispa Fukuoka	J1 League	28	0	1	0	4	0	33	0
2002	Avispa Fukuoka	J2 League	16	0	0	0	-		16	0
2003	Volca Kagoshima	Regional Leagues			1	0	-		1	0
2004	Volca Kagoshima	Regional Leagues			-		-			
Total			297	14	15	0	45	0	357	14
