= 1990 JSL Cup final =

| Nissan Motors | Furukawa Electric |
| 3 | 1 |
- Date: September 2, 1990
- Venue: Nagoya Mizuho Athletics Stadium, Aichi

1990 JSL Cup final was the 15th final of the JSL Cup competition. The final was played at Nagoya Mizuho Athletics Stadium in Aichi on September 2, 1990. Nissan Motors won the championship.

== Overview ==
Defending champion Nissan Motors won their 3rd title, by defeating Furukawa Electric 3–1 with Renato and Kazushi Kimura goal. Nissan Motors won the title for 3 years in a row.

== Match details ==
September 2, 1990

| Nissan Motors | 3-1 | Furukawa Electric |
|---|---|---|
| Renato 22'; 27' (o.g.); Kazushi Kimura 44' | | Masaaki Kanno 35' |

Nagoya Mizuho Athletics Stadium

== See also ==
- 1990 JSL Cup
