= Satoru Noda =

Satoru Noda may refer to:

- Satoru Noda (artist), Japanese manga artist
- Satoru Noda (footballer), Japanese football player
