= Mizunuma =

Mizunuma (written: 水沼 lit. "water marsh") is a Japanese surname. Notable people with the surname include:

- Kota Mizunuma (水沼 宏太, born 1990), Japanese footballer
- Naoki Mizunuma (水沼 尚輝, born 1996), Japanese swimmer
- Takashi Mizunuma (水沼 貴史, born 1960), Japanese footballer and manager

== See also ==
- Mizunuma Station, a railway station in Kiryū, Gunma Prefecture, Japan
- 6414 Mizunuma, a main-belt asteroid
