= 1994 Yokohama Marinos season =

Yokohama Marinos
1994 season
- Manager: Hidehiko Shimizu
- Stadium: Yokohama Mitsuzawa Football Stadium
- J.League: 6th
- Emperor's Cup: Semifinals
- J.League Cup: Semifinals
- Top goalscorer: League: Díaz (23); All: Díaz (26)
- Highest home attendance: 14,337 (vs Shimizu S-Pulse, 2 April 1994); 51,390 (vs Shimizu S-Pulse, 31 August 1994, Tokyo National Stadium)
- Lowest home attendance: 12,821 (vs Gamba Osaka, 12 November 1994)
- Average home league attendance: 19,801
Home colours	Away colours

1994 Yokohama Marinos season

== Review and events ==
=== League results summary ===
Overall								Home						Away					
Pld	W	D	L	GF	GA	GD	Pts	W	D	L	GF	GA	GD	W	D	L	GF	GA	GD
44	22	0	22	73	61	+12	66	11	0	11	33	30	+3	11	0	11	40	31	+9

Source: J.LEAGUE OFFICIAL 1995 RECORD & DATA. ISBN 4-09-102317-7.

=== League results by round ===
J.League Suntory series (first stage)
Round	1	2	3	4	5	6	7	8	9	10	11	12	13	14	15	16	17	18	19	20	21	22
Ground	H	A	H	A	H	H	A	H	H	A	A	H	A	H	A	A	H	A	A	H	H	A
Result	W	L	L	W	L	L	L	L	W	W	L	L	L	L	L	W	L	W	L	W	W	L
Position	3	7	7	7	7	7	9	10	9	6	7	8	8	10	11	11	11	8	9	8	8	9

Source: J.LEAGUE OFFICIAL 1995 RECORD & DATA. ISBN 4-09-102317-7.
A = Away; H = Home; W = Win; D = Draw; L = Loss

J.League NICOS series (second stage)
Round	1	2	3	4	5	6	7	8	9	10	11	12	13	14	15	16	17	18	19	20	21	22
Ground	H	A	H	A	H	H	A	H	H	A	A	H	A	H	A	A	H	A	A	H	H	A
Result	W	W	W	L	W	L	W	W	W	W	L	L	L	L	W	W	W	L	W	L	W	W
Position	3	1	1	2	1	2	2	1	2	1	3	3	3	4	3	3	3	3	3	3	3	3

Source: J.LEAGUE OFFICIAL 1995 RECORD & DATA. ISBN 4-09-102317-7.
A = Away; H = Home; W = Win; D = Draw; L = Loss

== Competitions ==
Competitions	Position
J.League	6th / 12 clubs
Emperor's Cup	Semifinals
J.League Cup	Semifinals

== Domestic results ==
=== J.League ===
==== Suntory series ====
12 March 1994 1st-1	Yokohama Marinos	2–0	Urawa Red Diamonds	Yokohama Mitsuzawa Football Stadium
15:02 JST (UTC+09)	Medina Bello 53'; Noda 89'	J. League		Attendance: 13,991; Referee: Shizuo Takada; Assistant referees: Hitoshi Yamada, Takeshi Ōkura; Fourth official: Susumu Takeda; Man of the Match: Medina Bello

16 March 1994 1st-2	Bellmare Hiratsuka	1–0 (V-goal) (a.e.t.)	Yokohama Marinos	Hiratsuka Stadium
19:02 JST (UTC+09)	Almir 110'	J. League		Attendance: 16,131; Referee: Tatsumi Ōno; Assistant referees: Yū Nakamura, Yasuhiro Matsuzaki; Fourth official: Akio Koizumi

19 March 1994 1st-3	Yokohama Marinos	0–1	Kashima Antlers	Yokohama Mitsuzawa Football Stadium
15:01 JST (UTC+09)		J. League	Alcindo 53'	Attendance: 14,055; Referee: Kiichirō Tachi; Assistant referees: Kazuaki Hamaguchi, Satoru Ishizawa; Fourth official: Yoshio Itō

23 March 1994 1st-4	Verdy Kawasaki	1–2	Yokohama Marinos	Tokyo National Stadium
19:05 JST (UTC+09)	Kitazawa 67'	J. League	Mizunuma 63'; Díaz 79' (pen.)	Attendance: 54,405; Referee: Zoran Petrović; Assistant referees: Noboru Ishiyama, Naotsugu Fuse; Fourth official: Tōru Kamikawa; Man of the Match: Takashi Mizunuma

26 March 1994 1st-5	Yokohama Marinos	2–3	Júbilo Iwata	Yokohama Mitsuzawa Football Stadium
15:01 JST (UTC+09)	Medina Bello 2'; Díaz 89'	J. League	M. Endō 23'; M. Suzuki 31'; Nakayama 36'	Attendance: 14,215; Referee: Kōetsu Kikuchi; Assistant referees: Keiichi Sunakawa, Kazuaki Hamaguchi; Fourth official: Masaki Yoshihara

2 April 1994 1st-6	Yokohama Marinos	0–1	Shimizu S-Pulse	Yokohama Mitsuzawa Football Stadium
19:06 JST (UTC+09)		J. League	Mukōjima 10'	Attendance: 14,337; Referee: Kenji Tanaka; Assistant referees: Yū Nakamura, Keiichi Sunakawa; Fourth official: Hideo Teranishi

6 April 1994 1st-7	JEF United Ichihara	3–2 (V-goal) (a.e.t.)	Yokohama Marinos	Tokyo National Stadium
19:02 JST (UTC+09)	Echigo 18'; Miyazawa 74'; Otze 96' (pen.)	J. League	Miura 44'; Mizunuma 82'	Attendance: 51,291; Referee: Kōetsu Kikuchi; Assistant referees: Hitoshi Yamada, Tetsu Karakida; Fourth official: Katsuhiko Takayama

9 April 1994 1st-8	Yokohama Marinos	0–2	Sanfrecce Hiroshima	Yokohama Mitsuzawa Football Stadium
19:03 JST (UTC+09)		J. League	Černý 43', 69'	Attendance: 13,739; Referee: Masahiro Sogawa; Assistant referees: Takeshi Ōkura, Kazuhisa Osada; Fourth official: Yoshiharu Nakamura

13 April 1994 1st-9	Yokohama Marinos	3–2	Nagoya Grampus Eight	Yokohama Mitsuzawa Football Stadium
19:02 JST (UTC+09)	Díaz 13', 26', 86'	J. League	Moriyama 24'; Hirano 81'	Attendance: 13,142; Referee: Tatsumi Ōno; Assistant referees: Noboru Ishiyama, Tetsu Karakida; Fourth official: Hideaki Kobayashi; Man of the Match: Díaz

16 April 1994 1st-10	Gamba Osaka	2–3	Yokohama Marinos	Expo '70 Commemorative Stadium
15:02 JST (UTC+09)	Morioka 8'; Isogai 49' (pen.)	J. League	Díaz 12', 63'; Medina Bello 20'	Attendance: 21,307; Referee: Bengt Borjesson; Assistant referees: Fumikazu Shioyazono, Yoshitsugu Katayama; Fourth official: Akira Okada; Man of the Match: Masaharu Suzuki

23 April 1994 1st-11	Yokohama Flügels	1–0	Yokohama Marinos	Yokohama Mitsuzawa Football Stadium
15:01 JST (UTC+09)	Maezono 73'	J. League		Attendance: 14,326; Referee: Zoran Petrović; Assistant referees: Noboru Ishiyama, Naotsugu Fuse; Fourth official: Nobuhiro Shirai

27 April 1994 1st-12	Yokohama Marinos	1–2	Bellmare Hiratsuka	Yokohama Mitsuzawa Football Stadium
19:02 JST (UTC+09)	Medina Bello 26'	J. League	Almir 72'; T. Iwamoto 74'	Attendance: 13,472; Referee: Fumikazu Shioyazono; Assistant referees: Yū Nakamura, Mitsuru Satō; Fourth official: Haruo Suzuki

30 April 1994 1st-13	Kashima Antlers	2–1 (V-goal) (a.e.t.)	Yokohama Marinos	Kashima Soccer Stadium
15:01 JST (UTC+09)	Alcindo 25' 99'	J. League	Miura 15'	Attendance: 15,061; Referee: Masayoshi Okada; Assistant referees: Hiroshi Fukuda, Masato Nogami; Fourth official: Ichirō Inukai

4 May 1994 1st-14	Yokohama Marinos	1–2	Verdy Kawasaki	Yokohama Mitsuzawa Football Stadium
19:04 JST (UTC+09)	Ihara 78'	J. League	Miura 86', 88'	Attendance: 13,343; Referee: Kōetsu Kikuchi; Assistant referees: Noboru Ishiyama, Masahiro Katagiri; Fourth official: Tōru Kamikawa

7 May 1994 1st-15	Júbilo Iwata	2–0	Yokohama Marinos	Júbilo Iwata Stadium
19:00 JST (UTC+09)	Paus 26'; Vanenburg 75'	J. League		Attendance: 14,478; Referee: Kiyoshi Ōta; Assistant referees: Kazuo Kakihana, Mikio Fukuoka; Fourth official: Tōru Nagata

14 May 1994 1st-16	Shimizu S-Pulse	0–3	Yokohama Marinos	Nihondaira Sports Stadium
19:02 JST (UTC+09)		J. League	Díaz 24', 73'; Medina Bello 56'	Attendance: 10,005; Referee: Tatsumi Ōno; Assistant referees: Yasushi Tsuchimoto, Naoyuki Mori; Fourth official: Teruhito Kudō; Man of the Match: Medina Bello

18 May 1994 1st-17	Yokohama Marinos	1–2 (V-goal) (a.e.t.)	JEF United Ichihara	Hakatanomori Athletic Stadium
19:03 JST (UTC+09)	Díaz 38'	J. League	Otze 25'; Echigo 103'	Attendance: 25,488; Referee: Hiroyuki Umemoto; Assistant referees: Hideaki Harada, Tōru Yamashiro; Fourth official: Hiroyuki Izumi

1 June 1994 1st-18	Sanfrecce Hiroshima	1–2	Yokohama Marinos	Hiroshima Big Arch
19:05 JST (UTC+09)	Hašek 72'	J. League	Bisconti 30'; Díaz 33'	Attendance: 13,416; Referee: Shizuo Takada; Assistant referees: Morihisa Yamaguchi, Hiroshi Tanabe; Fourth official: Mamoru Ueda; Man of the Match: Satoru Noda

4 June 1994 1st-19	Nagoya Grampus Eight	2–0	Yokohama Marinos	Nagoya Mizuho Football Stadium
14:01 JST (UTC+09)	Hirano 10'; 26' (o.g.)	J. League		Attendance: 12,190; Referee: Fumikazu Shioyazono; Assistant referees: Yasushi Tsuchimoto, Naoyuki Mori; Fourth official: Tsutomu Suda

8 June 1994 1st-20	Yokohama Marinos	3–2	Gamba Osaka	Tochigi Utsunomiya Green Stadium
19:00 JST (UTC+09)	Bisconti 44' (pen.); T. Suzuki 64'; Jinno 75'	J. League	Protassov 15', 17'	Attendance: 17,022; Referee: Masahiro Sogawa; Assistant referees: Kazuaki Hamaguchi, Satoru Ishizawa; Fourth official: Hiroshi Okusawa; Man of the Match: Takuya Jinno

11 June 1994 1st-21	Yokohama Marinos	2–1 (V-goal) (a.e.t.)	Yokohama Flügels	Hiratsuka Stadium
18:59 JST (UTC+09)	Díaz 80'; Omura 93'	J. League	Edu 37'	Attendance: 16,671; Referee: Yoshimi Ogawa; Assistant referees: Yū Nakamura, Satoru Kawano; Fourth official: Yasuhiko Koiso; Man of the Match: Norio Omura

15 June 1994 1st-22	Urawa Red Diamonds	2–1 (V-goal) (a.e.t.)	Yokohama Marinos	Urawa Komaba Stadium
19:02 JST (UTC+09)	Hirose 25'; Asano 108'	J. League	Noda 67'	Attendance: 9,822; Referee: Kiyoshi Ōta; Assistant referees: Kimio Izaki, Satoru Ishizawa; Fourth official: Izumi Okada

==== NICOS series ====
10 August 1994 2nd-1	Yokohama Marinos	3–0	Urawa Red Diamonds	Yokohama Mitsuzawa Football Stadium
19:01 JST (UTC+09)	Miura 48'; Medina Bello 65', 74'	J. League		Attendance: 13,639; Referee: Hideo Kikuchi; Assistant referees: Yū Nakamura, Yasushi Tsuchimoto; Fourth official: Noriyuki Sasaki; Man of the Match: Medina Bello

13 August 1994 2nd-2	Bellmare Hiratsuka	0–4	Yokohama Marinos	Hiratsuka Stadium
18:32 JST (UTC+09)		J. League	Díaz 26', 85'; Medina Bello 68', 75'	Attendance: 15,592; Referee: Tetsuya Hamana; Assistant referees: Noboru Ishiyama, Kazuaki Hamaguchi; Fourth official: Ryū Tetsusashi; Man of the Match: Díaz

17 August 1994 2nd-3	Yokohama Marinos	2–2 (V-goal) (a.e.t.) (4–3 p)	Kashima Antlers	Yokohama Mitsuzawa Football Stadium
19:03 JST (UTC+09)	Díaz 7'; Medina Bello 46'	J. League	Hasegawa 36', 75'	Attendance: 13,836; Referee: Yoshimi Ogawa; Assistant referees: Mitsuru Satō, Naotsugu Fuse; Fourth official: Takatoshi Itō; Man of the Match: Shigetatsu Matsunaga
	Penalties
	(penalty scored) Díaz; (penalty scored) Miura; (penalty scored) Ihara; (penalty scored) Mizunuma; (penalty missed) Medina Bello		(penalty missed) Alcindo; (penalty scored) Leonardo; (penalty scored) Hasegawa; (penalty scored) Ishii; (penalty missed) Ōno

20 August 1994 2nd-4	Verdy Kawasaki	1–0	Yokohama Marinos	Kawasaki Todoroki Stadium
19:03 JST (UTC+09)	Bentinho 15'	J. League		Attendance: 10,701; Referee: Kiyoshi Ōta; Assistant referees: Takeshi Ōkura, Tetsu Karakida; Fourth official: Haruo Imai

27 August 1994 2nd-5	Yokohama Marinos	2–1	Júbilo Iwata	Hakatanomori Athletic Stadium
19:03 JST (UTC+09)	Bisconti 39'; Díaz 44'	J. League	Vanenburg 68'	Attendance: 23,369; Referee: Shinichirō Obata; Assistant referees: Hideaki Harada, Tōru Yamashiro; Fourth official: Masatoshi Shibata; Man of the Match: Bisconti

31 August 1994 2nd-6	Yokohama Marinos	0–1	Shimizu S-Pulse	Tokyo National Stadium
19:04 JST (UTC+09)		J. League	Iwashita 52'	Attendance: 51,390; Referee: Zoran Petrović; Assistant referees: Noboru Ishiyama, Naotsugu Fuse; Fourth official: Kazuo Shirato

3 September 1994 2nd-7	JEF United Ichihara	2–3	Yokohama Marinos	Tokyo National Stadium
18:32 JST (UTC+09)	Ordenewitz 52' (pen.), 89' (pen.)	J. League	Bisconti 29', 33'; Medina Bello 74'	Attendance: 48,935; Referee: Yoshimi Ogawa; Assistant referees: Kazuaki Hamaguchi, Takeshi Ōkura; Fourth official: Misao Kataoka; Man of the Match: Masami Ihara

7 September 1994 2nd-8	Yokohama Marinos	3–0	Sanfrecce Hiroshima	Yokohama Mitsuzawa Football Stadium
19:03 JST (UTC+09)	Medina Bello 44', 66'; Yamada 86'	J. League		Attendance: 12,971; Referee: Alberto Tejada; Assistant referees: Noboru Ishiyama, Yū Nakamura; Fourth official: Tōru Kamikawa; Man of the Match: Takahiro Yamada

10 September 1994 2nd-9	Yokohama Marinos	2–1	Nagoya Grampus Eight	Yokohama Mitsuzawa Football Stadium
19:02 JST (UTC+09)	Bisconti 48' (pen.); Díaz 87'	J. League	Moriyama 89'	Attendance: 13,652; Referee: Kiichirō Tachi; Assistant referees: Hiroshi Fukuda, Kazuaki Hamaguchi; Fourth official: Junichi Sasaki; Man of the Match: Shigetatsu Matsunaga

14 September 1994 2nd-10	Gamba Osaka	0–0 (V-goal) (a.e.t.) (3–4 p)	Yokohama Marinos	Expo '70 Commemorative Stadium
19:01 JST (UTC+09)		J. League		Attendance: 19,060; Referee: Alberto Tejada; Assistant referees: Morihisa Yamaguchi, Tetsuya Hamana; Fourth official: Akio Okutani; Man of the Match: Shigetatsu Matsunaga
	Penalties
	(penalty scored) Flavio; (penalty scored) Kitamura; (penalty missed) Yamaguchi; (penalty scored) Tsveiba; (penalty missed) Protassov		(penalty scored) Díaz; (penalty missed) Miura; (penalty scored) Ihara; (penalty scored) Koizumi; (penalty scored) Mizunuma

17 September 1994 2nd-11	Yokohama Flügels	1–0	Yokohama Marinos	Yokohama Mitsuzawa Football Stadium
19:02 JST (UTC+09)	Válber 5'	J. League		Attendance: 14,508; Referee: Naotsugu Fuse; Assistant referees: Takashi Kunori, Yasuhiro Matsuzaki; Fourth official: Hiroshi Yamaguchi

21 September 1994 2nd-12	Yokohama Marinos	1–2	Bellmare Hiratsuka	Yokohama Mitsuzawa Football Stadium
19:02 JST (UTC+09)	Ueno 79'	J. League	Betinho 18' (pen.), 82'	Attendance: 13,448; Referee: Masayoshi Okada; Assistant referees: Kazuaki Hamaguchi, Hiroshi Fukuda; Fourth official: Mineo Takada

19 October 1994 2nd-13	Kashima Antlers	2–1	Yokohama Marinos	Kashima Soccer Stadium
19:04 JST (UTC+09)	Ishii 1'; Kurosaki 67'	J. League	Miura 77'	Attendance: 15,216; Referee: Kenji Tanaka; Assistant referees: Masato Nogami, Masahiro Katagiri; Fourth official: Ichirō Inukai

22 October 1994 2nd-14	Yokohama Marinos	0–2	Verdy Kawasaki	Tokyo National Stadium
15:03 JST (UTC+09)		J. League	Bismarck 35', 88'	Attendance: 49,243; Referee: Alberto Tejada; Assistant referees: Yū Nakamura, Tetsu Karakida; Fourth official: Kazuo Shirato

26 October 1994 2nd-15	Júbilo Iwata	1–2	Yokohama Marinos	Júbilo Iwata Stadium
19:03 JST (UTC+09)	Fujita 88'	J. League	Díaz 76'; Bisconti 82'	Attendance: 14,564; Referee: Keiichi Sunakawa; Assistant referees: Yasuhiro Hemmi, Kazuo Kakihana; Fourth official: Toshiaki Futamata; Man of the Match: Díaz

29 October 1994 2nd-16	Shimizu S-Pulse	1–3	Yokohama Marinos	Tokyo National Stadium
19:03 JST (UTC+09)	Hasegawa 11'	J. League	Díaz 7', 63'; Medina Bello 15'	Attendance: 48,157; Referee: Masayoshi Okada; Assistant referees: Hiroshi Fukuda, Masato Nogami; Fourth official: Yoshikazu Ozaki; Man of the Match: Masanori Suzuki

2 November 1994 2nd-17	Yokohama Marinos	3–2	JEF United Ichihara	Tokyo National Stadium
19:01 JST (UTC+09)	Díaz 20'; Medina Bello 68'; Omura 89'	J. League	Ejiri 5'; Ordenewitz 13'	Attendance: 48,677; Referee: Zoran Petrović; Assistant referees: Hiroshi Fukuda, Kazuhisa Osada; Fourth official: Takatoshi Itō; Man of the Match: Norio Omura

5 November 1994 2nd-18	Sanfrecce Hiroshima	2–1	Yokohama Marinos	Ehime Matsuyama Athletic Stadium
18:04 JST (UTC+09)	Černý 21', 53'	J. League	Jinno 5'	Attendance: 17,105; Referee: Shinichirō Obata; Assistant referees: Kazuya Yanagisawa, Satoru Kawano; Fourth official: Tatsuya Hyōdō

9 November 1994 2nd-19	Nagoya Grampus Eight	1–6	Yokohama Marinos	Gifu Nagaragawa Stadium
18:33 JST (UTC+09)	Ogura 49'	J. League	Zapata 18'; Miura 33', 70', 81'; Díaz 53' (pen.), 68'	Attendance: 23,072; Referee: Kenji Tanaka; Assistant referees: Yasushi Tsuchimoto, Naoyuki Mori; Fourth official: Takahiko Sugiyama; Man of the Match: Fumitake Miura

12 November 1994 2nd-20	Yokohama Marinos	0–1 (V-goal) (a.e.t.)	Gamba Osaka	Yokohama Mitsuzawa Football Stadium
15:02 JST (UTC+09)		J. League	Matsuyama 113'	Attendance: 12,821; Referee: Masayoshi Okada; Assistant referees: Kazuaki Hamaguchi, Tetsu Karakida; Fourth official: Katsumi Ishii

16 November 1994 2nd-21	Yokohama Marinos	2–0	Yokohama Flügels	Yokohama Mitsuzawa Football Stadium
19:01 JST (UTC+09)	Bisconti 37', 81'	J. League		Attendance: 13,102; Referee: Kiyoshi Ōta; Assistant referees: Keiichi Sunakawa, Kazuhisa Osada; Fourth official: Ryū Tetsusashi; Man of the Match: Bisconti

19 November 1994 2nd-22	Urawa Red Diamonds	3–6	Yokohama Marinos	Toyama Stadium
15:04 JST (UTC+09)	Rummenigge 18'; Taguchi 81'; Yamada 84'	J. League	Zapata 40'; Bisconti 45', 62'; Jinno 55'; Miura 68'; Omura 73'	Attendance: 22,838; Referee: Yōtarō Moritsu; Assistant referees: Kazuya Yanagisawa, Kōji Taniuchi; Fourth official: Kinji Sakō; Man of the Match: Zapata

=== Emperor's Cup ===
4 December 1994 1st Round	Yokohama Marinos	2–0	Hokuriku Electric Power	Tecnoport Fukui Stadium
: JST (UTC+09)	Díaz 66'; K. Kimura 77'			Attendance: 5,421

11 December 1994 2nd Round	Yokohama Marinos	1–0	Nagoya Grampus Eight	Tochigi Utsunomiya Green Stadium
: JST (UTC+09)	Díaz 79'			Attendance: 18,014

18 December 1994 Quarterfinals	Sanfrecce Hiroshima	0–3	Yokohama Marinos	Nagoya Mizuho Athletics Stadium
: JST (UTC+09)			Omura 22'; 26' (o.g.); Bisconti 68'	Attendance: 19,252

23 December 1994 Semifinals	Yokohama Marinos	1–2 (a.e.t.)	Cerezo Osaka	Kobe Universiade Memorial Stadium
: JST (UTC+09)	71' (o.g.)		Kazuhiro Murata 65'; Toninho 96'	Attendance: 35,087

=== J.League Cup ===
27 July 1994 1st Round	Kashiwa Reysol	1–2	Yokohama Marinos	Hakatanomori Athletic Stadium
19:00 JST (UTC+09)	Careca 39'	J. League	Omura 63'; Díaz 84'	Attendance: 8,558; Referee: Tatsumi Ōno; Assistant referees: Hideaki Harada, Satoru Kawano; Fourth official: Masatoshi Shibata

30 July 1994 Quarterfinals	Shimizu S-Pulse	1–3	Yokohama Marinos	Tochigi Utsunomiya Green Stadium
18:32 JST (UTC+09)	Nagashima 25'	J. League	Omura 7'; Yamada 11'; Bisconti 39'	Attendance: 18,021; Referee: Shizuo Takada; Assistant referees: Yū Nakamura, Mitsuru Satō; Fourth official: Kunikazu Nakayama

3 August 1994 Semifinals	Yokohama Marinos	0–1	Júbilo Iwata	Hakatanomori Athletic Stadium
19:01 JST (UTC+09)		J. League	Schillaci 42'	Attendance: 11,672; Referee: Kenji Tanaka; Assistant referees: Kazuaki Hamaguchi, Tōru Yamashiro; Fourth official: Hideaki Harada

== Player statistics ==
No.	Pos	Nat	Player	Total		J-League		Emperor's Cup		J-League Cup	
No.	Pos	Nat	Player	Apps	Goals	Apps	Goals	Apps	Goals	Apps	Goals
	GK	(Japan) JPN	Shigetatsu Matsunaga	50	0	43	0	4	0	3	0
	GK	(Japan) JPN	Izumi Yokokawa	0	0	0	0	0	0	0	0
	GK	(Japan) JPN	Takeshi Urakami	2	0	2	0	0	0	0	0
	GK	(Japan) JPN	Daijirō Takakuwa	0	0	0	0	0	0	0	0
	DF	(Japan) JPN	Hiroshi Hirakawa	11	0	11	0	0	0	0	0
	DF	(Japan) JPN	Masami Ihara	47	1	41	1	4	0	2	0
	DF	(Japan) JPN	Junji Koizumi	14	0	14	0	0	0	0	0
	DF	(Japan) JPN	Norio Omura	40	6	33	3	4	1	3	2
	DF	(Japan) JPN	Masaharu Suzuki	41	0	34	0	4	0	3	0
	DF	(Japan) JPN	Kunio Nagayama	22	0	22	0	0	0	0	0
	DF	(Japan) JPN	Tetsuya Itō	7	0	6	0	0	0	1	0
	DF	(Japan) JPN	Takehito Suzuki	29	1	22	1	4	0	3	0
	DF	(Japan) JPN	Hiroaki Kimura	0	0	0	0	0	0	0	0
	DF	(Japan) JPN	Satoshi Horiuchi	0	0	0	0	0	0	0	0
	MF	(Japan) JPN	Kazushi Kimura	17	1	10	0	4	1	3	0
	MF	(Brazil) BRA	Everton	1	0	1	0	0	0	0	0
	MF	(Japan) JPN	Takashi Mizunuma	17	2	15	2	1	0	1	0
	MF	(Argentina) ARG	Gustavo Zapata	26	2	20	2	4	0	2	0
	MF	(Japan) JPN	Rikizō Matsuhashi	8	0	8	0	0	0	0	0
	MF	(Argentina) ARG	Bisconti	32	13	25	11	4	1	3	1
	MF	(Japan) JPN	Satoru Noda	48	2	41	2	4	0	3	0
	MF	(Japan) JPN	Kazuto Saiki	0	0	0	0	0	0	0	0
	MF	(Japan) JPN	Masahiro Katō	0	0	0	0	0	0	0	0
	MF	(Japan) JPN	Takahiro Yamada	36	2	32	1	1	0	3	1
	MF	(Japan) JPN	Junichirō Murashige	0	0	0	0	0	0	0	0
	MF	(Japan) JPN	Nobuhisa Isono	0	0	0	0	0	0	0	0
	MF	(Japan) JPN	Shinya Nishikawa	0	0	0	0	0	0	0	0
	MF	(Japan) JPN	Yoshito Terakawa	0	0	0	0	0	0	0	0
	MF	(Japan) JPN	Mitsunobu Moriya	0	0	0	0	0	0	0	0
	MF	(Japan) JPN	Akihiro Endō	0	0	0	0	0	0	0	0
	FW	(Argentina) ARG	Ramón Díaz	44	26	37	23	4	2	3	1
	FW	(Argentina) ARG	Medina Bello	31	15	30	15	0	0	1	0
	FW	(Japan) JPN	Masato Koga	0	0	0	0	0	0	0	0
	FW	(Japan) JPN	Takuya Jinno	27	3	25	3	0	0	2	0
	FW	(Japan) JPN	Fumitake Miura	45	8	38	8	4	0	3	0
	FW	(Japan) JPN	Satoru Yoshida	2	0	2	0	0	0	0	0
	MF	(Japan) JPN	Yoshiharu Ueno †	18	1	15	1	3	0	0	0
	DF	(Japan) JPN	Kensaku Ōmori †	1	0	1	0	0	0	0	0

- † player(s) joined the team after the opening of this season.

== Transfers ==
In:

No.	Pos.	Nation	Player
—	GK	JPN	Yoshikatsu Kawaguchi (from Shimizu Commercial High School)
—	MF	JPN	Mitsunobu Moriya (from Sendai Ikuei High School)
—	MF	JPN	Akihiro Endō (from Kagoshima Jitsugyo High School)
—	DF	JPN	Tetsuya Itō (from NKK)
—	FW	JPN	Medina Bello (from River Plate)

Out:

No.	Pos.	Nation	Player
—	GK	JPN	Isao Ueda
—	DF	JPN	Toshinobu Katsuya (to Júbilo Iwata)
—	DF	JPN	Tsuney Okazaki
—	MF	JPN	Tatsuya Ai (to Otsuka Pharmaceutical)
—	MF	JPN	Keiichi Zaizen (to Kashiwa Reysol)
—	MF	JPN	Yutaka Matsushita
—	MF	JPN	Mikio Miyashita

== Transfers during the season ==
=== In ===
- (Japan) Yoshiharu Ueno (from Waseda University)
- (Japan) Kensaku Ōmori (from Minamiuwa High School)

=== Out ===
- (Brazil) Everton Nogueira (on June)

== Awards ==
- J.League Best XI: (Japan) Masami Ihara

== Other pages ==
- (in Japanese) J. League official site
- (in Japanese) Yokohama F. Marinos official site
