= Terakawa =

Terakawa (written: 寺川) is a Japanese surname. Notable people with the surname include:

- Aya Terakawa (寺川 綾, born 1948), Japanese swimmer
- Yoshito Terakawa (寺川 能人, born 1974), Japanese footballer
- Aimi Terakawa (寺川 愛美, born 1991), Japanese voice actor

== See also ==
- 28004 Terakawa, a main-belt asteroid
