= 1993 Yokohama Marinos season =

Yokohama Marinos
1993 season
- Manager: Hidehiko Shimizu
- Stadium: Yokohama Mitsuzawa Football Stadium
- J.League: 4th
- Emperor's Cup: Quarterfinals
- J.League Cup: GL-B 5th
- Asian Cup Winners' Cup: Semifinals
- Top goalscorer: League: Ramón Díaz (28); All: Ramón Díaz (32)
- Highest home attendance: 14,450 (vs Nagoya Grampus Eight, 28 August 1993); 53,376 (vs Verdy Kawasaki, 19 June 1993, Tokyo National Stadium)
- Lowest home attendance: 10,332 (vs Gamba Osaka, 19 May 1993)
- Average home league attendance: 16,781
Home colours	Away colours	Third colours

1993 Yokohama Marinos season

== Review and events ==
=== League results summary ===
Overall								Home						Away					
Pld	W	D	L	GF	GA	GD	Pts	W	D	L	GF	GA	GD	W	D	L	GF	GA	GD
36	21	0	15	60	48	+12	63	14	0	4	38	23	+15	7	0	11	22	25	−3

Source: J.LEAGUE OFFICIAL RECORD & DATA 1994. ISBN 4-09-102309-6.

=== League results by round ===
J.League Suntory series (first stage)
Round	1	2	3	4	5	6	7	8	9	10	11	12	13	14	15	16	17	18
Ground	A	H	A	A	H	A	H	A	H	A	H	H	A	H	A	H	A	H
Result	W	W	L	L	L	W	L	W	W	L	W	W	W	W	L	W	L	W
Position	3	2	4	5	8	7	8	7	5	7	6	4	2	2	2	2	3	3

Source: J.LEAGUE OFFICIAL RECORD & DATA 1994. ISBN 4-09-102309-6.
A = Away; H = Home; W = Win; D = Draw; L = Loss

J.League NICOS series (second stage)
Round	1	2	3	4	5	6	7	8	9	10	11	12	13	14	15	16	17	18
Ground	H	A	H	H	A	H	A	H	A	H	A	A	H	A	H	A	H	H
Result	W	L	L	W	L	L	W	W	L	W	L	L	W	W	W	W	W	L
Position	2	4	7	6	7	8	7	7	8	5	8	6	6	5	4	3	3	3

Source: J.LEAGUE OFFICIAL RECORD & DATA 1994. ISBN 4-09-102309-6.
A = Away; H = Home; W = Win; D = Draw; L = Loss

== Competitions ==
Competitions	Position
J.League	4th / 10 clubs
Emperor's Cup	Quarterfinals
J.League Cup	GL-B 5th / 6 clubs
Asian Cup Winners' Cup	Semifinals

== Domestic results ==
=== J.League ===
==== Suntory series ====
15 May 1993 1st-1	Verdy Kawasaki	1–2	Yokohama Marinos	Tokyo National Stadium
19:29 JST (UTC+09)	Meijer 19'	J. League	Everton 48'; Díaz 59'	Attendance: 59,626; Referee: Shinichirō Obata; Assistant referees: Hideo Kikuchi, Fumikazu Shioyazono; Fourth official: Kōetsu Kikuchi

19 May 1993 1st-2	Yokohama Marinos	1–0 (a.s.d.e.t.)	Gamba Osaka	Yokohama Mitsuzawa Football Stadium
19:00 JST (UTC+09)	Bisconti 112'	J. League		Attendance: 10,332; Referee: Masayoshi Okada; Assistant referees: Keiichi Sunakawa, Kazuaki Hamaguchi; Fourth official: Tōru Kamikawa

22 May 1993 1st-3	Nagoya Grampus Eight	1–1 (a.s.d.e.t.) (4–3 p)	Yokohama Marinos	Nagoya Mizuho Football Stadium
15:02 JST (UTC+09)	Sawairi 77'	J. League	Everton 32'	Attendance: 11,267; Referee: Martin Bodenham; Assistant referees: Fumikazu Shioyazono, Yoshimi Ogawa; Fourth official: Takayoshi Kashino
	Penalties
	(penalty missed) Yonekura; (penalty scored) Sawairi; (penalty scored) Moriyama; (penalty scored) Lineker; (penalty scored) Fujikawa		(penalty missed) Everton; (penalty scored) Ihara; (penalty scored) Bisconti; (penalty scored) Díaz; (penalty missed) Miura

26 May 1993 1st-4	Sanfrecce Hiroshima	1–0	Yokohama Marinos	Hiroshima Stadium
18:59 JST (UTC+09)	Takagi 57'	J. League		Attendance: 12,858; Referee: Kenji Tanaka; Assistant referees: Morihisa Yamaguchi, Masanori Watanabe; Fourth official: Shinji Saga

29 May 1993 1st-5	Yokohama Marinos	0–5	JEF United Ichihara	Yokohama Mitsuzawa Football Stadium
14:01 JST (UTC+09)		J. League	Kageyama 13'; 38' (o.g.); Pavel 47'; Ejiri 51'; Littbarski 82'	Attendance: 11,152; Referee: Kiyoshi Ōta; Assistant referees: Yū Nakamura, Satoru Ishizawa; Fourth official: Tadahiko Nishimaki

2 June 1993 1st-6	Urawa Red Diamonds	0–1	Yokohama Marinos	Urawa Komaba Stadium
19:02 JST (UTC+09)		J. League	Noda 77'	Attendance: 9,088; Referee: Hitoshi Yamada; Assistant referees: Toshiyuki Mayuzumi, Kazuaki Hamaguchi; Fourth official: Morihiko Yamaji

5 June 1993 1st-7	Yokohama Marinos	0–2	Kashima Antlers	Hakatanomori Athletic Stadium
18:30 JST (UTC+09)		J. League	Santos 14'; Alcindo 56'	Attendance: 28,595; Referee: Martin Bodenham; Assistant referees: Kōetsu Kikuchi, Hideaki Harada; Fourth official: Masatoshi Shibata

9 June 1993 1st-8	Shimizu S-Pulse	1–2	Yokohama Marinos	Nihondaira Sports Stadium
19:00 JST (UTC+09)	Sawanobori 53'	J. League	Yamada 35', 41'	Attendance: 9,464; Referee: Fumikazu Shioyazono; Assistant referees: Kimio Izaki, Yoshimi Ogawa; Fourth official: Masami Urayama

12 June 1993 1st-9	Yokohama Marinos	3–2	Yokohama Flügels	Yokohama Mitsuzawa Football Stadium
18:31 JST (UTC+09)	Miura 1', 17'; Díaz 21'	J. League	Aldro 15'; Moner 82'	Attendance: 11,734; Referee: Hideo Kikuchi; Assistant referees: Yū Nakamura, Masato Nogami; Fourth official: Tetsuya Sugano

16 June 1993 1st-10	Gamba Osaka	2–1 (a.s.d.e.t.)	Yokohama Marinos	Expo '70 Commemorative Stadium
18:59 JST (UTC+09)	Kusaki 89' 109'	J. League	Hirakawa 41'	Attendance: 19,247; Referee: Hiroyuki Umemoto; Assistant referees: Morihisa Yamaguchi, Yoshitsugu Katayama; Fourth official: Tsuyoshi Miyake

19 June 1993 1st-11	Yokohama Marinos	2–0	Verdy Kawasaki	Tokyo National Stadium
19:04 JST (UTC+09)	Hirakawa 42'; Díaz 61'	J. League		Attendance: 53,376; Referee: Martin Bodenham; Assistant referees: Hiroshi Fukuda, Noboru Ishiyama; Fourth official: Kazuo Kojima

23 June 1993 1st-12	Yokohama Marinos	3–2	Sanfrecce Hiroshima	Yokohama Mitsuzawa Football Stadium
18:59 JST (UTC+09)	Bisconti 12', 25'; Díaz 31'	J. League	Noh 47', 56'	Attendance: 11,863; Referee: Tetsuya Hamana; Assistant referees: Keiichi Sunakawa, Kazuaki Hamaguchi; Fourth official: Jōji Kashihara

26 June 1993 1st-13	JEF United Ichihara	1–3	Yokohama Marinos	Ichihara Stadium
18:34 JST (UTC+09)	Littbarski 57'	J. League	Díaz 50', 68', 85'	Attendance: 10,116; Referee: Masayoshi Okada; Assistant referees: Takeshi Ōkura, Noboru Ishiyama; Fourth official: Kazuya Isokawa

30 June 1993 1st-14	Yokohama Marinos	5–1	Urawa Red Diamonds	Yokohama Mitsuzawa Football Stadium
19:00 JST (UTC+09)	Díaz 9', 47', 53'; Bisconti 36'; K. Kimura 39'	J. League	Mizuuchi 52'	Attendance: 12,110; Referee: Shizuo Takada; Assistant referees: Mitsuru Satō, Keiichi Sunakawa; Fourth official: Mitsuo Ōno

3 July 1993 1st-15	Kashima Antlers	3–1	Yokohama Marinos	Kashima Soccer Stadium
15:03 JST (UTC+09)	Kurosaki 18'; Alcindo 34', 77'	J. League	Jinno 79'	Attendance: 14,976; Referee: Kōetsu Kikuchi; Assistant referees: Hiroshi Fukuda, Masato Nogami; Fourth official: Ichirō Inukai

7 July 1993 1st-16	Yokohama Marinos	3–1	Shimizu S-Pulse	Yokohama Mitsuzawa Football Stadium
19:02 JST (UTC+09)	Bisconti 31'; Díaz 60', 79'	J. League	Hasegawa 66'	Attendance: 12,199; Referee: Hitoshi Yamada; Assistant referees: Mitsuru Satō, Keiichi Sunakawa; Fourth official: Haruo Suzuki

10 July 1993 1st-17	Yokohama Flügels	1–0	Yokohama Marinos	Yokohama Mitsuzawa Football Stadium
18:35 JST (UTC+09)	Maezono 47'	J. League		Attendance: 13,943; Referee: Martin Bodenham; Assistant referees: Masayoshi Okada, Hisashi Uemura; Fourth official: Takashi Aoki

14 July 1993 1st-18	Yokohama Marinos	1–0	Nagoya Grampus Eight	Yokohama Mitsuzawa Football Stadium
19:01 JST (UTC+09)	Koizumi 14'	J. League		Attendance: 12,280; Referee: Fumikazu Shioyazono; Assistant referees: Noboru Ishiyama, Naotsugu Fuse

==== NICOS series ====
24 July 1993 2nd-1	Yokohama Marinos	3–0	Verdy Kawasaki	Yokohama Mitsuzawa Football Stadium
18:33 JST (UTC+09)	Bisconti 4'; Díaz 43', 72' (pen.)	J. League		Attendance: 14,248; Referee: Shizuo Takada; Assistant referees: Hitoshi Yamada, Yū Nakamura; Fourth official: 清美 Sasaki

31 July 1993 2nd-2	Urawa Red Diamonds	0–0 (a.s.d.e.t.) (4–2 p)	Yokohama Marinos	Urawa Komaba Stadium
18:32 JST (UTC+09)		J. League		Attendance: 9,375; Referee: Kiichirō Tachi; Assistant referees: Naotsugu Fuse, Kimio Izaki; Fourth official: Keiji Kamiara
	Penalties
	(penalty scored) Mochizuki; (penalty scored) Fukuda; (penalty scored) Hori; (penalty scored) Trivisonno		(penalty missed) Bisconti; (penalty scored) Ihara; (penalty scored) Mizunuma; (penalty missed) Koizumi

4 August 1993 2nd-3	Yokohama Marinos	0–4	Shimizu S-Pulse	Yokohama Mitsuzawa Football Stadium
19:01 JST (UTC+09)		J. League	Edu 35', 85'; Sawanobori 44'; Mukōjima 46'	Attendance: 13,146; Referee: Shizuo Takada; Assistant referees: Tatsumi Ōno, Takashi Kunori; Fourth official: Akira Sanpei

7 August 1993 2nd-4	Yokohama Marinos	1–1 (a.s.d.e.t.) (8–7 p)	Kashima Antlers	Yokohama Mitsuzawa Football Stadium
16:03 JST (UTC+09)	Miura 59'	J. League	Zico 30'	Attendance: 14,152; Referee: Hitoshi Yamada; Assistant referees: Yū Nakamura, Kimio Izaki; Fourth official: Kazuhiko Uchida
	Penalties
	(penalty scored) Ihara; (penalty scored) Bisconti; (penalty scored) Hirakawa; (penalty scored) Noda; (penalty scored) K. Kimura; (penalty scored) Koizumi; (penalty missed) Yamada; (penalty scored) Miura; (penalty scored) Nagayama		(penalty scored) Santos; (penalty scored) Kurosaki; (penalty scored) Akita; (penalty scored) Sugiyama; (penalty scored) Alcindo; (penalty scored) Gaya; (penalty missed) Honda; (penalty scored) Hasegawa; (penalty missed) Naitō

14 August 1993 2nd-5	Gamba Osaka	2–1	Yokohama Marinos	Expo '70 Commemorative Stadium
16:03 JST (UTC+09)	Metkov 2', 68'	J. League	Bisconti 31'	Attendance: 21,509; Referee: Kiyoshi Ōta; Assistant referees: Kazuo Kakihana, Hideaki Harada; Fourth official: Tsuyoshi Miyake

20 August 1993 2nd-6	Yokohama Marinos	1–2 (a.s.d.e.t.)	Sanfrecce Hiroshima	Yokohama Mitsuzawa Football Stadium
19:03 JST (UTC+09)	Díaz 40'	J. League	Matsuda 33'; Takagi 102'	Attendance: 14,102; Referee: Masayoshi Okada; Assistant referees: Keiichi Sunakawa, Noboru Ishiyama; Fourth official: Noriyuki Sasaki

25 August 1993 2nd-7	JEF United Ichihara	2–2 (a.s.d.e.t.) (2–4 p)	Yokohama Marinos	Tochigi Utsunomiya Green Stadium
19:00 JST (UTC+09)	Pavel 69'; Echigo 71'	J. League	Díaz 21', 51'	Attendance: 17,226; Referee: Masahiro Sogawa; Assistant referees: Toshiyuki Mayuzumi, Naotsugu Fuse; Fourth official: Akira Itō
	Penalties
	(penalty missed) Littbarski; (penalty missed) Pavel; (penalty scored) [Frank Ordenewitz		(penalty scored) Ihara; (penalty scored) Miura; (penalty scored) Bisconti; (penalty scored) Noda

28 August 1993 2nd-8	Yokohama Marinos	2–0	Nagoya Grampus Eight	Yokohama Mitsuzawa Football Stadium
18:33 JST (UTC+09)	Jinno 13'; Bisconti 47'	J. League		Attendance: 14,450; Referee: Kenji Tanaka; Assistant referees: Noboru Ishiyama, Takashi Kunori; Fourth official: Mitsuo Ōno

3 September 1993 2nd-9	Yokohama Flügels	3–2	Yokohama Marinos	Yokohama Mitsuzawa Football Stadium
19:03 JST (UTC+09)	Yamaguchi 3', 86'; 70' (o.g.)	J. League	Díaz 35', 69'	Attendance: 13,257; Referee: Masayoshi Okada; Assistant referees: Keiichi Sunakawa, Takashi Kunori; Fourth official: Kanichi Takahashi

6 November 1993 2nd-10	Yokohama Marinos	3–2 (a.s.d.e.t.)	Urawa Red Diamonds	Yokohama Mitsuzawa Football Stadium
15:01 JST (UTC+09)	Miura 48'; Díaz 73' (pen.); Everton 97'	J. League	F. Ikeda 23'; Hirose 85'	Attendance: 14,207; Referee: Tatsumi Ōno; Assistant referees: Takashi Kunori, Naotsugu Fuse; Fourth official: Tsuyoshi Karasawa

10 November 1993 2nd-11	Verdy Kawasaki	1–0 (a.s.d.e.t.)	Yokohama Marinos	Tokyo National Stadium
19:04 JST (UTC+09)	Takeda 91'	J. League		Attendance: 55,243; Referee: Fumikazu Shioyazono; Assistant referees: Keiichi Sunakawa, Kimio Izaki; Fourth official: Jōji Kashihara

13 November 1993 2nd-12	Kashima Antlers	3–2	Yokohama Marinos	Kashima Soccer Stadium
19:03 JST (UTC+09)	Alcindo 21', 69'; Zico 77'	J. League	Díaz 0', 19'	Attendance: 14,235; Referee: Hideo Kikuchi; Assistant referees: Hiroshi Fukuda, Masahiro Katagiri; Fourth official: Ichirō Inukai

17 November 1993 2nd-13	Yokohama Marinos	4–0	Gamba Osaka	Yokohama Mitsuzawa Football Stadium
19:03 JST (UTC+09)	Everton 7'; Díaz 56', 83'; Mizunuma 70'	J. League		Attendance: 13,589; Referee: Masahiro Sogawa; Assistant referees: Keiichi Sunakawa, Noboru Ishiyama; Fourth official: Haruo Suzuki

21 November 1993 2nd-14	Sanfrecce Hiroshima	1–2	Yokohama Marinos	Oita Athletic Stadium
13:04 JST (UTC+09)	Shima 21'	J. League	Miura 55'; Mizunuma 67'	Attendance: 14,640; Referee: Shinichirō Obata; Assistant referees: Morihisa Yamaguchi, Yū Nakamura; Fourth official: Tsunenori Nagamatsu

27 November 1993 2nd-15	Yokohama Marinos	2–0	JEF United Ichihara	Hakatanomori Athletic Stadium
16:03 JST (UTC+09)	Koizumi 28'; Yamada 47'	J. League		Attendance: 27,495; Referee: Juan Carlos Crespi; Assistant referees: Hiroyuki Umemoto, Hideaki Harada; Fourth official: Masatoshi Shibata

1 December 1993 2nd-16	Nagoya Grampus Eight	1–2	Yokohama Marinos	Nagoya Mizuho Football Stadium
19:04 JST (UTC+09)	Jorginho 15'	J. League	Díaz 30'; Mizunuma 56'	Attendance: 11,446; Referee: Kenji Tanaka; Assistant referees: Yoshikazu Hiroshima, Yoshimi Ogawa; Fourth official: Takayoshi Kashino

8 December 1993 2nd-17	Yokohama Marinos	4–1	Yokohama Flügels	Yokohama Mitsuzawa Football Stadium
19:02 JST (UTC+09)	Díaz 11', 56', 79'; Everton 43'	J. League	Aldro 78'	Attendance: 13,024; Referee: Tetsuya Hamana; Assistant referees: Noboru Ishiyama, Kazuaki Hamaguchi; Fourth official: Takatoshi Itō

15 December 1993 2nd-18	Shimizu S-Pulse	1–0	Yokohama Marinos	Tokyo National Stadium
19:03 JST (UTC+09)	Ōenoki 55'	J. League		Attendance: 48,937; Referee: Masayoshi Okada; Assistant referees: Kimio Izaki, Naotsugu Fuse; Fourth official: Takuji Fukazawa

=== Emperor's Cup ===
5 December 1993 1st Round	Yokohama Marinos	3–1	Kashiwa Reysol	Kagoshima Kamoike Stadium
: JST (UTC+09)	Díaz 17'; Mizunuma 32'; Miura 77'		Careca 29'	Attendance: 11,979

11 December 1993 2nd Round	Yokohama Marinos	2–1	Kawasaki Steel	Nagoya Minato Stadium
: JST (UTC+09)	Mizunuma 26'; Bisconti 44'		Kinoshita 71'	Attendance: 14,438

19 December 1993 Quarterfinals	Yokohama Marinos	1–3	Sanfrecce Hiroshima	Hiroshima Big Arch
: JST (UTC+09)	Miura 28'		Černý 38', 79'; Shima 53'	Attendance: 12,065

=== J.League Cup ===
11 September 1993 GL-B-1	Yokohama Flügels	3–1	Yokohama Marinos	Yokohama Mitsuzawa Football Stadium
18:32 JST (UTC+09)	Edu 52', 70'; Aldro 87'	J. League	Díaz 15' (pen.)	Attendance: 13,419; Referee: Juan Carlos Crespi; Assistant referees: Kōetsu Kikuchi, Noboru Ishiyama; Fourth official: Toshiya Kumagai

GL-B-2	bye

18 September 1993 GL-B-3	Yokohama Marinos	1–5	Shimizu S-Pulse	Yokohama Mitsuzawa Football Stadium
18:30 JST (UTC+09)	Everton 53'	J. League	Mukōjima 18'; Sugimoto 27'; Edu 47'; Iwashita 61', 69'	Attendance: 13,769; Referee: Kōetsu Kikuchi; Assistant referees: Keiichi Sunakawa, Kazuaki Hamaguchi; Fourth official: Tōru Kamikawa

25 September 1993 GL-B-4	Nagoya Grampus Eight	4–1	Yokohama Marinos	Tokyo National Stadium
18:31 JST (UTC+09)	Lineker 16' (pen.), 56'; Hirano 82'; Egawa 88'	J. League	Díaz 89' (pen.)	Attendance: 52,063; Referee: Kōetsu Kikuchi; Assistant referees: Noboru Ishiyama, Naotsugu Fuse; Fourth official: Takayoshi Kashino

2 October 1993 GL-B-5	Yokohama Marinos	2–0	Júbilo Iwata	Yokohama Mitsuzawa Football Stadium
18:30 JST (UTC+09)	Bisconti 52'; Díaz 68'	J. League		Attendance: 13,186; Referee: Masahiro Sogawa; Assistant referees: Yū Nakamura, Kazuaki Hamaguchi; Fourth official: Mineo Takada

GL-B-6	bye

16 October 1993 GL-B-7	Urawa Red Diamonds	1–2	Yokohama Marinos	Omiya Football Stadium
18:30 JST (UTC+09)	Mochizuki 10'	J. League	Yamada 38'; Everton 76'	Attendance: 9,092; Referee: Fumikazu Shioyazono; Assistant referees: Toshiyuki Mayuzumi, Naotsugu Fuse; Fourth official: Masahisa Kajiwara

== International results ==
=== Asian Cup Winners' Cup ===
1st Round	bye

8 September 1993 2nd Round-1	(Japan) Yokohama Marinos	5–0	Air Force Philippines	Yokohama, Japan
	Jinno ?', ?'; Zaizen ?'; Matsuhashi ?'; Mizunuma ?' (pen.)			Attendance: Yokohama Mitsuzawa Football Stadium

15 September 1993 2nd Round-2	Air Force Philippines	0–1 (6–0 agg.)	(Japan) Yokohama Marinos	Manila, Philippines
			? ?'

22 September 1993 Quarterfinals-1	(Indonesia) Semen Padang	2–1	(Japan) Yokohama Marinos	Padang, Indonesia
	? ?' ? ?'		? ?'

29 September 1993 Quarterfinals-2	(Japan) Yokohama Marinos	11–0 (12–2 agg.)	(Indonesia) Semen Padang	Tokyo, Japan
	? ?' ? ?' ? ?' ? ?' ? ?' ? ?' ? ?' ? ?' ? ?' ? ?' ? ?'			Stadium: Tokyo National Stadium

Semifinals	(Japan) Yokohama Marinos	withdrew	(Hong Kong) South China

== Player statistics ==
Pos.	Nat.	Player	D.o.B. (Age)	Height / Weight	J.League		Emperor's Cup		J.League Cup		Dom. Total		Asian Cup Winners' Cup	
Pos.	Nat.	Player	D.o.B. (Age)	Height / Weight	Apps	Goals	Apps	Goals	Apps	Goals	Apps	Goals	Apps	Goals
MF	(Japan)	Kazushi Kimura	July 19, 1958 (aged 34)	168 cm / 64 kg	21	1	0	0	2	0	23	1		
FW	(Argentina)	Díaz	August 29, 1959 (aged 33)	172 cm / 68 kg	32	28	3	1	5	3	40	32		
MF	(Brazil)	Everton	December 12, 1959 (aged 33)	176 cm / 71 kg	22	5	0	0	4	2	26	7		
MF	(Japan)	Takashi Mizunuma	May 28, 1960 (aged 32)	172 cm / 63 kg	26	3	3	2	3	0	32	5		
DF	(Japan)	Toshinobu Katsuya	September 2, 1961 (aged 31)	176 cm / 72 kg	25	0	1	0	0	0	26	0		
GK	(Japan)	Shigetatsu Matsunaga	August 12, 1962 (aged 30)	180 cm / 73 kg	36	0	3	0	0	0	39	0		
GK	(Japan)	Izumi Yokokawa	February 25, 1963 (aged 30)	183 cm / 80 kg	0	0	0	0	3	0	3	0		
DF	(Japan)	Hiroshi Hirakawa	January 10, 1965 (aged 28)	179 cm / 78 kg	31	2	3	0	5	0	39	2		
DF	(Japan)	Masami Ihara	September 18, 1967 (aged 25)	181 cm / 72 kg	32	0	1	0	0	0	33	0		
DF	(Japan)	Junji Koizumi	January 11, 1968 (aged 25)	183 cm / 73 kg	27	2	3	0	2	0	32	2		
MF	(Japan)	Tatsuya Ai	April 17, 1968 (aged 25)	169 cm / 65 kg	1	0	0	0	1	0	2	0		
MF	(Japan)	Keiichi Zaizen	June 17, 1968 (aged 24)	173 cm / 60 kg	1	0	0	0	0	0	1	0		
MF	(Japan)	Rikizō Matsuhashi	August 22, 1968 (aged 24)	173 cm / 68 kg	3	0	0	0	2	0	5	0		
MF	(Japan)	Yutaka Matsushita	September 13, 1968 (aged 24)	174 cm / 69 kg	0	0	0	0	0	0	0	0		
MF	(Argentina)	Bisconti	September 22, 1968 (aged 24)	178 cm / 75 kg	27	8	3	1	5	1	35	10		
GK	(Japan)	Takeshi Urakami	February 7, 1969 (aged 24)	183 cm / 80 kg	0	0	0	0	2	0	2	0		
MF	(Japan)	Satoru Noda	March 19, 1969 (aged 24)	174 cm / 68 kg	23	1	0	0	5	0	28	1		
DF	(Japan)	Norio Omura	September 6, 1969 (aged 23)	181 cm / 75 kg	29	0	3	0	3	0	35	0		
MF	(Japan)	Mikio Miyashita	September 23, 1969 (aged 23)	171 cm / 64 kg	0	0	0	0	0	0	0	0		
FW	(Japan)	Masato Koga	May 22, 1970 (aged 22)	170 cm / 63 kg	0	0	0	0	0	0	0	0		
FW	(Japan)	Takuya Jinno	June 1, 1970 (aged 22)	178 cm / 70 kg	19	2	0	0	2	0	21	2		
DF	(Japan)	Masaharu Suzuki	August 3, 1970 (aged 22)	168 cm / 65 kg	5	0	0	0	2	0	7	0		
FW	(Japan)	Fumitake Miura	August 12, 1970 (aged 22)	174 cm / 71 kg	24	5	3	2	4	0	31	7		
MF	(Japan)	Kazuto Saiki	August 20, 1970 (aged 22)	177 cm / 70 kg	0	0	0	0	0	0	0	0		
DF	(Japan)	Kunio Nagayama	September 16, 1970 (aged 22)	170 cm / 63 kg	16	0	2	0	5	0	23	0		
FW	(Japan)	Satoru Yoshida	December 18, 1970 (aged 22)	179 cm / 72 kg	0	0	0	0	0	0	0	0		
MF	(Japan)	Masahiro Katō	April 2, 1971 (aged 22)	173 cm / 65 kg	0	0	0	0	0	0	0	0		
GK	(Japan)	Isao Ueda	April 11, 1971 (aged 22)	188 cm / 80 kg	0	0	0	0	0	0	0	0		
DF	(Japan)	Takehito Suzuki	June 11, 1971 (aged 21)	178 cm / 75 kg	2	0	0	0	5	0	7	0		
MF	(Japan)	Takahiro Yamada	April 29, 1972 (aged 21)	175 cm / 70 kg	27	3	3	0	1	1	31	4		
DF		Tsuney Okazaki	July 20, 1972 (aged 20)	180 cm / 76 kg	0	0	0	0	0	0	0	0		
DF	(Japan)	Hiroaki Kimura	May 20, 1973 (aged 19)	175 cm / 64 kg	0	0	0	0	0	0	0	0		
MF	(Japan)	Junichirō Murashige	June 1, 1973 (aged 19)	173 cm / 66 kg	0	0	0	0	0	0	0	0		
GK	(Japan)	Daijirō Takakuwa	August 10, 1973 (aged 19)	190 cm / 80 kg	0	0	0	0	0	0	0	0		
MF	(Japan)	Nobuhisa Isono	January 8, 1974 (aged 19)	174 cm / 72 kg	0	0	0	0	0	0	0	0		
MF	(Japan)	Shinya Nishikawa	June 12, 1974 (aged 18)	169 cm / 58 kg	0	0	0	0	0	0	0	0		
DF	(Japan)	Satoshi Horiuchi	August 5, 1974 (aged 18)	178 cm / 69 kg	0	0	0	0	0	0	0	0		
MF	(Japan)	Yoshito Terakawa	September 6, 1974 (aged 18)	178 cm / 60 kg	0	0	0	0	0	0	0	0		
MF	(Argentina)	Zapata †	October 15, 1967 (aged 25)	cm / - kg	3	0	3	0	0	0	6	0		

- † player(s) joined the team after the opening of this season.

== Transfers ==
In:

No.	Pos.	Nation	Player
—	MF	ARG	David Bisconti (from Rosario Central)
—	FW	ARG	Ramón Díaz (from River Plate)
—	DF	JPN	Satoshi Horiuchi (from Nissan youth)
—	MF	JPN	Masahiro Katō (from Shizuoka Gakuen Senior High School)
—	MF	JPN	Kazuto Saiki (from Aoyama Gakuin University)
—	MF	JPN	Yoshito Terakawa (from Takigawa Daini Senior High School)
—	MF	JPN	Shinya Nishikawa (from Tokai University Daigo Senior High School)
—	FW	JPN	Fumitake Miura (from University of Tsukuba)
—	FW	JPN	Masato Koga (from Hosei University)

Out:

No.	Pos.	Nation	Player
—	DF	JPN	Tōru Sano (retired)
—	FW	BRA	Renato (to Hitachi)
—	DF	JPN	Yoshinori Hiroma
—	MF	JPN	Naofumi Koike
—	FW	JPN	Tetsuya Kawakami
—	MF	BRA	Mario César

== Transfers during the season ==
=== In ===
- (Argentina) Gustavo Zapata (from River Plate on November)

== Awards ==
- J.League Top Scorer: (Argentina) Ramón Díaz
- J.League Best XI: (Japan) Shigetatsu Matsunaga, (Japan) Masami Ihara, (Argentina) Ramón Díaz

== Other pages ==
- (in Japanese) J. League official site
- (in Japanese) Yokohama F. Marinos official site
