= Yoshito Terakawa =

Japanese footballer

Yoshito Terakawa 寺川 能人
Personal information
- Full name: Yoshito Terakawa
- Date of birth: September 6, 1974 (age 52)
- Place of birth: Hyogo, Japan
- Height: 1.81 m (5 ft 11 1/2 in)
- Position: Midfielder

Youth career
- 1990–1992: Takigawa Daini High School

Senior career*
Years	Team	Apps	(Gls)
1993–1998	Yokohama Marinos	46	(0)
1999	JEF United Ichihara	19	(1)
2000–2002	Albirex Niigata	120	(23)
2003	Oita Trinita	30	(4)
2004–2008	Albirex Niigata	136	(1)
2009–2010	Shonan Bellmare	80	(8)
2011–2012	FC Ryukyu	52	(3)
Total		483	(40)
Medal record
Yokohama Marinos
Winner	J1 League	1995
- * Club domestic league appearances and goals

Yoshito Terakawa (寺川 能人, Terakawa Yoshito; born September 6, 1974) is a former Japanese football player.

== Playing career ==
Terakawa was born in Hyogo Prefecture on September 6, 1974. After graduating from high school, he joined Yokohama Marinos in 1993. He debuted as central midfielder in 1995 and the club won the champions 1995 J1 League. However he could not become a regular player and he moved to JEF United Ichihara in 1999. In 2000, he moved to J2 League club Albirex Niigata. He became a regular player and played for the club in 3 seasons. In 2003, he moved to newly was promoted to J1 League club, Oita Trinita and played in all matches in 2003 season. In 2004, he returned to newly was promoted to J1 club, Albirex Niigata. He played for the club in 5 seasons. In 2009, he moved to J2 club Shonan Bellmare. He played in all matches in 2009 and the club was promoted to J1. In 2011, he moved to Japan Football League club FC Ryukyu. He retired end of 2012 season.

== Club statistics ==
Club	Season	League	League		Emperor's Cup		J.League Cup		Total	
Club	Season	League	Apps	Goals	Apps	Goals	Apps	Goals	Apps	Goals
Yokohama Marinos	1993	J1 League	0	0	0	0	0	0	0	0
Yokohama Marinos	1994	J1 League	0	0	0	0	0	0	0	0
Yokohama Marinos	1995	J1 League	19	0	0	0	-		19	0
Yokohama Marinos	1996	J1 League	6	0	0	0	1	0	7	0
Yokohama Marinos	1997	J1 League	10	0	0	0	4	0	14	0
Yokohama Marinos	1998	J1 League	11	0	0	0	2	0	13	0
JEF United Ichihara	1999	J1 League	19	1	0	0	2	0	21	1
Albirex Niigata	2000	J2 League	36	3	3	0	1	0	40	3
Albirex Niigata	2001	J2 League	42	11	4	0	1	0	47	11
Albirex Niigata	2002	J2 League	42	9	3	1	-		45	10
Oita Trinita	2003	J1 League	30	4	1	0	3	0	34	4
Albirex Niigata	2004	J1 League	27	0	1	1	4	0	32	1
Albirex Niigata	2005	J1 League	31	0	2	1	5	1	38	2
Albirex Niigata	2006	J1 League	33	1	2	0	5	0	40	1
Albirex Niigata	2007	J1 League	18	0	1	0	6	0	25	0
Albirex Niigata	2008	J1 League	27	0	2	0	3	0	32	0
Shonan Bellmare	2009	J2 League	51	7	0	0	-		51	7
Shonan Bellmare	2010	J1 League	29	1	2	0	4	0	35	1
FC Ryukyu	2011	Football League	30	1	0	0	–		30	1
FC Ryukyu	2012	Football League	22	2	0	0	–		22	2
Total			483	40	21	3	41	1	545	44
