= Tosu Futures =

Tosu Futures 鳥栖フューチャーズ
- Full name: Tosu Futures
- Nickname: Futures
- Founded: 1987 (as PJM Futures)
- Dissolved: 1997
- Ground: Tosu Stadium, Tosu, Saga
- Capacity: 24,000
- League: Japan Football League
Home colours	Away colours

The Tosu Futures (鳥栖フューチャーズ, Tosu Futures) was a former Japanese football club that played in the Japan Football League between 1994 and 1996.

== History ==
PJM Futures was founded in Hamamatsu, Shizuoka in 1987 as the team of PJM Japan, a company based on Paul J. Meyer's U.S. academy Success Motivation Institute (the company name came from Meyer's initials). The club was later moved to Tosu, Saga in 1994, where it changed its name to Tosu Futures. This happened one year after joining the former Japan Football League's Division 2 (which was merged into a single JFL division in 1994). Saga Stadium was used as a temporary home ground until Tosu Stadium opened in 1996. In January 1997, Tosu futures ceased operations following the withdrawal of PJM Japan and was dissolved. In February 1997, Sagan Tosu was established.

== Former players ==
- (Japan) Hitoshi Morishita (1987–1996)
- (Japan) Shigetatsu Matsunaga (1995–1996)
- (Argentina) Hugo Maradona (1992–1994)
- (Argentina) Sergio Batista (1993–1994)
- (Argentina) Pedro Pasculli (1994)
- (Argentina) Héctor Enrique (1995)
- (Federal Republic of Yugoslavia) Dragiša Binić (1995)
- (Federal Republic of Yugoslavia) Zoran Maričić (1995)
- (Federal Republic of Yugoslavia) Zoran Milinković (1995)
- (Federal Republic of Yugoslavia) Aleksandar Zelenović (1995)
- (Cameroon) Stephen Tataw (1995–1996)
