= 1988–89 Japan Soccer League =

Japan Soccer League
- Season: 1988-89
- Teams: 12
- Champions: Nissan; 1st title
- Runner up: ANA Club
- Matches: 132
- Goals: 292 (2.21 per match)
- Top goalscorer: Adílson (11 goals)

Statistics of Japan Soccer League for the 1988–89 season.

== First Division ==
Nissan won their first league title. By winning the 1988 Emperor's Cup and 1988 Japan Soccer League Cup along with the title, Nissan completed the second Japanese treble. For the first time, the format of three points for a win was adopted, but only for the First Division.

Four-time champion Mitsubishi was relegated for the first time, along with struggling Sumitomo.

Pos	Team	Pld	W	D	L	GF	GA	GD	Pts	Qualification or relegation
1	Nissan	22	14	4	4	32	17	+15	46	1989–90 Asian Club Championship
2	ANA Club	22	12	4	6	37	22	+15	40	
3	Yamaha Motors	22	12	3	7	31	21	+10	39	
4	Fujita Engineering	22	10	6	6	34	20	+14	36	
5	Yomiuri	22	8	8	6	25	23	+2	32	
6	Furukawa Electric	22	8	5	9	21	19	+2	29	
7	Matsushita Electric	22	8	5	9	26	30	−4	29	
8	Yanmar Diesel	22	7	7	8	23	22	+1	28	
9	Honda	22	7	6	9	20	23	−3	27	
10	Nippon Kokan	22	3	10	9	17	31	−14	19	
11	Sumitomo	22	4	7	11	12	37	−25	19	Relegated to Second Division
12	Mitsubishi Motors	22	1	11	10	14	27	−13	14	Relegated to Second Division

Source: RSSSF

=== Topscorers ===
Rank	Player	Goals
1	(Brazil) Adílson (Yamaha Motor)	11
2	(Japan) Osamu Maeda (All Nippon Airways Club)	10
3	(Japan) Koichi Hashiratani (Nissan Motors) (Japan) Katsuhiro Kusaki (Yanmar) (Japan) Koichi Kobayashi (Fujita Industries) (Japan) Katsuhiro Kusaki (Yanmar) (Japan) Masanobu Yamaguchi (Matsushita Electric)	9
7	(Japan) Kazushi Kimura (Nissan Motors)	8

== Second Division ==
This was the last season in which the second tier was contested in an East-and-West format. Toshiba won a second championship, but this time their promotion was automatic. Fallen giant Hitachi, still adjusting to the change in town, joined them. Regional outfits Fujieda Municipal and NTT Kansai went back to their regional leagues.

=== First stage ===
==== East ====
Pos	Team	Pld	W	D	L	GF	GA	GD	Pts
1	Toshiba	14	9	5	0	38	7	+31	23
2	Fujitsu	14	8	4	2	22	13	+9	20
3	Hitachi	14	7	5	2	18	9	+9	19
4	NTT Kanto	14	6	4	4	16	12	+4	16
5	Kofu Club	14	7	0	7	19	24	−5	14
6	Toho Titanium	14	3	3	8	10	24	−14	9
7	Cosmo Oil	14	2	4	8	13	25	−12	8
8	Fujieda City Office	14	1	1	12	7	29	−22	3

Source: RSSSF

==== West ====
Pos	Team	Pld	W	D	L	GF	GA	GD	Pts
1	Mazda	14	9	4	1	24	6	+18	22
2	Toyota Motors	14	8	5	1	27	8	+19	21
3	Tanabe Pharmaceuticals	14	8	3	3	20	11	+9	19
4	Osaka Gas	14	7	4	3	20	18	+2	18
5	Nippon Steel	14	4	4	6	16	19	−3	12
6	Kawasaki Steel	14	1	6	7	8	15	−7	8
7	Teijin Matsuyama	14	2	4	8	18	32	−14	8
8	NTT Kansai	14	1	2	11	7	31	−24	4

Source: RSSSF

=== Second stage ===
==== Promotion Group ====
Pos	Team	Pld	W	D	L	GF	GA	GD	Pts	Promotion
1	Toshiba	14	8	5	1	20	10	+10	21	Promoted to First Division
2	Hitachi	14	8	2	4	13	9	+4	18	Promoted to First Division
3	Tanabe Pharmaceuticals	14	6	5	3	17	13	+4	17	
4	Fujitsu	14	6	4	4	16	15	+1	16	
5	Mazda	14	5	4	5	16	9	+7	14	
6	Toyota Motors	14	3	6	5	18	18	0	12	
7	NTT Kanto	13	4	2	7	18	20	−2	10	
8	Osaka Gas	13	0	2	11	5	29	−24	2	

Source: RSSSF

==== Relegation Group ====
===== East =====
Pos	Team	Pld	W	D	L	GF	GA	GD	Pts	Relegation
1	Kofu Club	6	2	2	2	24	29	−5	20	
2	Cosmo Oil	6	4	1	1	25	30	−5	17	
3	Toho Titanium	6	1	2	3	17	33	−16	13	
4	Fujieda City Office	6	1	3	2	11	38	−27	8	Relegated to Regional Leagues

Source: RSSSF

===== West =====
Pos	Team	Pld	W	D	L	GF	GA	GD	Pts	Relegation
1	Nippon Steel	6	3	2	1	25	25	0	20	
2	Kawasaki Steel	6	1	4	1	15	22	−7	14	
3	Teijin Matsuyama	6	2	1	3	26	42	−16	13	
4	NTT Kansai	6	2	1	3	17	42	−25	9	Relegated to Regional Leagues

Source: RSSSF

===== 9th-16th Places Playoff =====
Pos	East	Score	West
9–10	Kofu Club	1-1(PK3-1)	Nippon Steel
11–12	Cosmo Oil	0-0(PK3-2)	Kawasaki Steel
13–14	Toho Titanium	2-3	Teijin Matsuyama
15–16	Fujieda City Office	0-3	NTT Kansai
