= 1992–93 Asian Cup Winners' Cup =

Tournament details
- Teams: 17

Final positions
- Champions: (Japan) Yokohama Marinos (2nd title)
- Runners-up: (Iran) Persepolis

The 1992–93 Asian Cup Winners' Cup was the third edition of association football competition run by the Asian Football Confederation specifically for its members cup holders.

Defending champions Yokohama Marinos defeated Persepolis in the final. They became the first team to successfully defend their title in the Asian Cup Winners' Cup, and the first to win two titles.

== Teams ==
Location of the 1992–93 Asian Cup Winners Cup teams

== Bracket ==
First round

Second round

Intermediate round

Semi-finals

Final

(Bangladesh) Mohammedan
1
0
1

(Vietnam) Quảng Nam-Đà Nẵng
1
1
2

(Vietnam) Quảng Nam-Đà Nẵng (w/o)
–
–
–

(Singapore) Balestier Khalsa
–
–
–

(Vietnam) Quảng Nam-Đà Nẵng
1
0
1

(Japan) Yokohama Marinos
1
3
4

(Indonesia) Pupuk Kaltim (w/o)
–
–
–

(Hong Kong) Sing Tao
–
–
–

(Indonesia) Pupuk Kaltim
1
1
2

(Japan) Yokohama Marinos
1
3
4

(Japan) Yokohama Marinos
1
1
1

(Iran) Persepolis
1
1
2

(Iran) Persepolis (w/o)
–
–
–

(Lebanon) Safa
–
–
–

(Iran) Persepolis
0
2
2

(Oman) Fanja
0
0
0

(Oman) Fanja (w/o)
–
–
–

(India) Mohammedan
–
–
–

(Iran) Persepolis
2
1
3

(United Arab Emirates) Baniyas Club
1
1
2

(Jordan) Al Ramtha
3
1
4

(United Arab Emirates) Baniyas Club
2
5
7

(Iran) Persepolis
1
1
2

(Saudi Arabia) Al Ittihad
0
1
1

(Kuwait) Al-Arabi
0
1
1

(Qatar) Al-Ahli
0
0
0

(Kuwait) Al-Arabi
0
1
1

(Saudi Arabia) Al Ittihad
1
2
3

== First round ==
Team 1	Agg.	Team 2	1st leg	2nd leg
Pupuk Kaltim (Indonesia)	w/o (Note: Pupuk Kaltim won on walkover as Sing Tao withdrew.)	(Hong Kong) Sing Tao	Canc.	Canc.
PIA (Pakistan)	Canc. (Note: The tie was scratched after PIA and York withdrew.)	(Sri Lanka) York	Canc.	Canc.
Quảng Nam-Đà Nẵng (Vietnam)	w/o (Note: Quảng Nam-Đà Nẵng won on walkover as Balestier Khalsa withdrew.)	(Singapore) Balestier United	Canc.	Canc.
Al Arabi (Kuwait)	1–0	(Qatar) Al Ahli	0–0	1–0
Al Ramtha (Jordan)	4–7	(United Arab Emirates) Baniyas Club	3–2	1–5
Fanja (Oman)	w/o (Note: Fanja won on walkover as Mohammedan withdrew.)	(India) Mohammedan	Canc.	Canc.
Persepolis (Iran)	w/o (Note: Persepolis won on walkover as Safa withdrew.)	(Lebanon) Safa	Canc.	Canc.
Yokohama Marinos (Japan)	bye			
Mohammedan (Bangladesh)	bye			
Al Ittihad (Saudi Arabia)	bye			

== Second round ==
Team 1	Agg.	Team 2	1st leg	2nd leg
Pupuk Kaltim (Indonesia)	2–4	(Japan) Yokohama Marinos	1–1	1–3
Al Arabi (Kuwait)	1–3	(Saudi Arabia) Al Ittihad	0–1	1–2
Persepolis (Iran)	2–0	(Oman) Fanja	0–0	2–0
Quảng Nam-Đà Nẵng (Vietnam)	bye			
Mohammedan (Bangladesh)	bye (Note: Mohammedan were initially drawn against the winner of the fixture involving PIA and York, but both teams withdrew.)			
Baniyas Club (United Arab Emirates)	bye			

== Intermediate round ==
Team 1	Agg.	Team 2	1st leg	2nd leg
Persepolis (Iran)	3–2	(United Arab Emirates) Baniyas Club	2–1	1–1
Mohammedan (Bangladesh)	1–2	(Vietnam) Quảng Nam-Đà Nẵng	1–1	0–1

== Semi-finals ==
Team 1	Agg.	Team 2	1st leg	2nd leg
Quảng Nam-Đà Nẵng (Vietnam)	1–4	(Japan) Yokohama Marinos	1–1	0–3
Persepolis (Iran)	2–1	(Saudi Arabia) Al Ittihad	1–0	1–1

== Final ==
Team 1	Agg.	Team 2	1st leg	2nd leg
Yokohama Marinos (Japan)	2–1	(Iran) Persepolis	1–1	1–0

=== First leg ===
January 17, 1993

Yokohama Marinos (Japan)	1–1	(Iran) Persepolis
Renato		Hassan Shirmohammadi

National Stadium, Tokyo

=== Second leg ===
April 16, 1993

Persepolis (Iran)	0–1	(Japan) Yokohama Marinos
		Takuya Jinno

Azadi Stadium, Tehran
