= 1989–90 Japan Soccer League =

Japan Soccer League
- Season: 1989-90
- Teams: 12
- Champions: Nissan; 2nd title
- Runner up: Yomiuri
- Matches: 132
- Goals: 305 (2.31 per match)
- Top goalscorer: Renato (17 goals)

== League tables ==
=== First Division ===
Nissan won a second title, spurred by increasing links between the team, its parent company and their hometown, Yokohama. Fujita Industries and Hitachi were relegated. By winning the 1989 Emperor's Cup and 1989 Japan Soccer League Cup along with the title, Nissan completed their second Japanese treble. This is the third treble in the nation's history.

Pos	Team	Pld	W	D	L	GF	GA	GD	Pts	Qualification or relegation
1	Nissan	22	14	5	3	44	26	+18	47	1990–91 Asian Club Championship
2	Yomiuri S.C.	22	13	7	2	38	16	+22	46	
3	ANA Club	22	11	7	4	34	19	+15	40	
4	Furukawa Electric	22	10	8	4	25	16	+9	38	
5	Yamaha Motors	22	9	7	6	23	19	+4	34	
6	Honda	22	10	2	10	32	29	+3	32	
7	Yanmar Diesel	22	6	9	7	20	23	−3	27	
8	Nippon Kokan	22	5	9	8	16	32	−16	24	
9	Toshiba	22	4	8	10	20	28	−8	20	
10	Matsushita Electric	22	4	7	11	24	31	−7	19	
11	Fujita Engineering	22	4	5	13	17	30	−13	17	Relegated to Second Division
12	Hitachi	22	3	4	15	12	36	−24	13	Relegated to Second Division

Source: RSSSF

==== Topscorers ====
Rank	Player	Goals
1	(Brazil) Renato (Nissan Motors)	17
2	(Japan) Akihiro Nagashima (Matsushita Electric)	15
3	(Japan) Nobuhiro Takeda (Yomiuri Club)	13
4	(Japan) Hisashi Kurosaki (Honda Motor)	11

=== Second Division ===
Fallen giant Mitsubishi and struggler Toyota Motors returned to the top flight. Mazda Auto Hiroshima, who had been put as an A-squad to rival its parent company, and Teijin went back to their regional leagues (Chugoku and Shikoku, respectively).

Pos	Team	Pld	W	D	L	GF	GA	GD	Pts	Promotion or relegation
1	Mitsubishi Motors	30	22	4	4	89	25	+64	70	Promoted to First Division
2	Toyota Motors	30	22	3	5	84	26	+58	69	Promoted to First Division
3	Mazda	30	20	7	3	62	20	+42	67	
4	Kyoto Shiko Club	30	17	9	4	61	28	+33	60	
5	Fujitsu	30	17	4	9	58	35	+23	55	
6	Sumitomo	30	14	10	6	50	27	+23	52	
7	Tanabe Pharmaceuticals	30	15	7	8	44	36	+8	52	
8	Kawasaki Steel	30	14	7	9	47	23	+24	49	
9	NTT Kanto	30	13	8	9	41	32	+9	47	
10	Cosmo Oil	30	8	8	14	38	39	−1	32	
11	Toho Titanium	30	6	9	15	26	56	−30	27	
12	Kofu Club	30	5	9	16	25	51	−26	24	
13	Nippon Steel	30	7	3	20	29	68	−39	24	
14	Osaka Gas	30	5	4	21	17	78	−61	19	
15	Mazda Auto Hiroshima	30	3	3	24	30	87	−57	12	Relegated to Regional Leagues
16	Teijin SC Matsuyama	30	2	5	23	16	86	−70	11	Relegated to Regional Leagues

Source: RSSSF
