= 1988 Emperor's Cup =

Tournament details
- Country: Japan

Final positions
- Champions: Nissan Motors
- Runners-up: Fujita Industries
- Semifinalists: Yamaha Motors; All Nippon Airways

Statistics of Emperor's Cup in the 1988 season.

== Overview ==
It was contested by 32 teams, and Nissan Motors won the championship.

== Results ==
=== 1st round ===
- Yamaha Motors 3–0 Toho Titanium
- Fujitsu 1–2 Matsushita Electric
- Cosmo Oil 2–1 Toshiba
- Aoyama Gakuin University 0–8 Honda
- Yomiuri 4–1 TDK
- Komazawa University 2–1 YKK
- Yanmar Diesel 8–1 Sapporo University
- Tsukuba University 0–2 Nissan Motors
- Mitsubishi Motors 1–0 Mazda
- Doshisha University 1–2 Sumitomo Metals
- Osaka University of Commerce 3–4 Yawata Steel
- Mitsubishi Chemical Kurosaki 1–5 Fujita Industries
- Furukawa Electric 1–0 Chuo Bohan
- Tanabe Pharmaceuticals 4–1 Teijin
- All Nippon Airways 5–0 Osaka University of Health and Sport Sciences
- Toyota Motors 1–0 NKK

=== 2nd round ===
- Yamaha Motors 2–0 Matsushita Electric
- Cosmo Oil 0–2 Honda
- Yomiuri 3–0 Komazawa University
- Yanmar Diesel 0–1 Nissan Motors
- Mitsubishi Motors 1–2 Sumitomo Metals
- Yawata Steel 0–7 Fujita Industries
- Furukawa Electric 1–1 (PK 2–4) Tanabe Pharmaceuticals
- All Nippon Airways 3–1 Toyota Motors

=== Quarterfinals ===
- Yamaha Motors 2–0 Honda
- Yomiuri 1–1 (PK 2–3) Nissan Motors
- Sumitomo Metals 0–2 Fujita Industries
- Tanabe Pharmaceuticals 0–1 All Nippon Airways

=== Semifinals ===
- Yamaha Motors 0–1 Nissan Motors
- Fujita Industries 2–1 All Nippon Airways

=== Final ===
- Nissan Motors 3–1 Fujita Industries

Nissan Motors won the championship Excluded from the Asian Cup Winners' Cup 1989.
