= 1991–92 Asian Cup Winners' Cup =

Tournament details
- Teams: 17

Final positions
- Champions: (Japan) Nissan (1st title)
- Runners-up: (Saudi Arabia) Al Nassr

The 1991–92 Asian Cup Winners' Cup was the second edition of association football competition run by the Asian Football Confederation specifically for its members cup holders.

== Bracket ==
First round
(Bahrain) Al-Ahli	1	0	1
(Jordan) Al-Ramtha	0	2	2
(United Arab Emirates) Sharjah	2	0	2
(Oman) Dhofar (a)	1	1	2
(Qatar) Al-Sadd	1	1	2 (2)
(Kuwait) Kazma (p)	1	1	2 (4)
(Saudi Arabia) Al-Nassr	2	2	4
(Lebanon) Al-Ansar	1	1	2
(Bangladesh) Abahani KC	0	0	0
(India) East Bengal	0	1	1
(Japan) Nissan	6	0	6
(Singapore) Geylang	0	0	0
(Indonesia) Pupuk Kaltim	6	3	9
(Pakistan) Karachi Port Trust	0	0	0

Second round
(Jordan) Al-Ramtha	1	1	2
(Oman) Dhofar	0	1	1
(Saudi Arabia) Al-Nassr	2	0	2
(Yemen) Al-Ahli	0	0	0

Quarter-finals
(Jordan) Al-Ramtha (a)	0	1	1
(Iran) Malavan	0	1	1
(Kuwait) Kazma	0	1	1
(Saudi Arabia) Al-Nassr	1	2	3
(India) East Bengal	1	0	1
(Japan) Nissan	3	4	7
(Indonesia) Pupuk Kaltim	w/o
(Philippines) Sinugba^{1}

Semi-finals
(Jordan) Al-Ramtha	0	1	1
(Saudi Arabia) Al-Nassr	1	2	3
(Japan) Nissan	2	0	2
(Indonesia) Pupuk Kaltim	0	0	0

Final
(Saudi Arabia) Al-Nassr	1	0	1
(Japan) Nissan	1	5	6

^{1} Withdrew.

== First round ==
=== West Asia ===
Team 1	Agg.	Team 2	1st leg	2nd leg
Sharjah (United Arab Emirates)	2–2 (a)	(Oman) Dhofar	2–1	0–1
Al Sadd (Qatar)	2–2 (2–4p)	(Kuwait) Kazma	1–1	1–1
Al Nassr (Saudi Arabia)	4–2	(Lebanon) Al Ansar	2–1	2–1
Al Ahli (Bahrain)	1–2	(Jordan) Al Ramtha	1–0	0–2
Al Ahli (Yemen)	bye			
Malavan (Iran)	bye			

=== East Asia ===
Team 1	Agg.	Team 2	1st leg	2nd leg
Nissan (Japan)	6–0	(Singapore) Geylang	6–0	0–0
Pupuk Kaltim (Indonesia)	9–0^{1}	(Pakistan) Karachi Port Trust	6–0	3–0
Abahani KC (Bangladesh)	0–1	(India) East Bengal	0–0	0–1
Sinugba (Philippines)	bye^{2}			

^{1} Pupuk Kaltim entered as the Indonesian league runners-up for 1990, as the 1991/92 league had not yet finished.
^{2} Sinugba were drawn against the South Korean representatives, but the South Korean FA did not send a team.

== Second Round (West Asia) ==
Team 1	Agg.	Team 2	1st leg	2nd leg
Al Nassr (Saudi Arabia)	2–0	(Yemen) Al Ahli	2–0	0–0
Al Ramtha (Jordan)	2–1	(Oman) Dhofar	1–0	1–1
Malavan (Iran)	bye			
Kazma (Kuwait)	bye			

== Quarterfinals ==
Team 1	Agg.	Team 2	1st leg	2nd leg
Al Ramtha (Jordan)	1–1 (a)	(Iran) Malavan	0–0	1–1
Kazma (Kuwait)	1–3	(Saudi Arabia) Al Nassr	0–1	1–2
East Bengal (India)	1–7	(Japan) Nissan	1–3	0–4
Pupuk Kaltim (Indonesia)	w/o^{1}	(Philippines) Sinugba		

^{1} Sinugba withdrew.

== Semifinals ==
Team 1	Agg.	Team 2	1st leg	2nd leg
Al Ramtha (Jordan)	1–3	(Saudi Arabia) Al Nassr	0–1	1–2
Nissan (Japan)	2–0	(Indonesia) Pupuk Kaltim	2–0	0–0

== Final ==
Al Nassr lost 5-0 was the record in the finals of the Asian Cup Winners' Cup

Team 1	Agg.	Team 2	1st leg	2nd leg
Al Nassr (Saudi Arabia)	1–6	(Japan) Nissan	1–1	0–5

=== 1st leg ===
January 30, 1992

Al Nassr (Saudi Arabia)	1–1	(Japan) Nissan
Walid Al Torayr 72'		Koichi Hashiratani 04'

Prince Faisal bin Fahd Stadium, Riyadh
Referee: Fayez Betar (Syria)

=== 2nd leg ===
February 7, 1992

Nissan (Japan)	5–0	(Saudi Arabia) Al Nassr
Everton 35'; Carlos Renato 37', 52', 62'; Matsuhashi 70'

Nissan fc Stadium
