= 1988 JSL Cup =

Tournament details
- Country: Japan

Final positions
- Champions: Nissan Motors
- Runners-up: Toshiba
- Semifinalists: Mitsubishi Motors; Yanmar Diesel

Statistics of JSL Cup in the 1988 season.

== Overview ==
It was contested by 28 teams, and Nissan Motors won the championship.

== Results ==
=== 1st round ===
- Nissan Motors 7-0 Osaka Gas
- Yomiuri 5-0 Cosmo Oil
- Hitachi 3-1 Kofu
- Mitsubishi Motors 4-1 Kawasaki Steel
- Fujita Industries 3-0 Fujitsu
- Yamaha Motors 3-0 Teijin
- Mazda 2-1 NTT Kansai
- Toshiba 1-0 Tanabe Pharmaceuticals
- Furukawa Electric 1-0 Nippon Steel
- Yanmar Diesel 4-0 Fujieda City Office
- Matsushita Electric 0-0 (PK 3–4) NTT Kanto
- Toyota Motors 5-0 Toho Titanium

=== 2nd round ===
- NKK 1-3 Nissan Motors
- Yomiuri 1-0 Hitachi
- Mitsubishi Motors 2-1 Fujita Industries
- Yamaha Motors 0-2 All Nippon Airways
- Honda 1-1 (PK 3–4) Mazda
- Toshiba 3-2 Furukawa Electric
- Yanmar Diesel 1-1 (PK 5–4) NTT Kanto
- Toyota Motors 2-3 Sumitomo Metals

=== Quarterfinals ===
- Nissan Motors 1-0 Yomiuri
- Mitsubishi Motors 2-1 All Nippon Airways
- Mazda 0-0 (PK 1–4) Toshiba
- Yanmar Diesel 5-1 Sumitomo Metals

=== Semifinals ===
- Nissan Motors 2-0 Mitsubishi Motors
- Toshiba 1-0 Yanmar Diesel

=== Final ===
- Nissan Motors 3-0 Toshiba

Nissan Motors won the championship
