= 1989 Emperor's Cup =

Tournament details
- Country: Japan

Final positions
- Champions: Nissan Motors
- Runners-up: Yamaha Motors
- Semifinalists: Yomiuri Club; All Nippon Airways

Statistics of Emperor's Cup in the 1989 season.

== Overview ==
It was contested by 32 teams, and Nissan Motors won the championship.

== Results ==
=== 1st round ===
- Nissan Motors 3–1 Tokai University
- Cosmo Oil 0–0 (PK 2–0) Mitsubishi Motors
- Honda 4–3 Tsukuba University
- Sapporo Mazda 1–4 Yanmar Diesel
- Yomiuri 4–0 Osaka Gas
- Mitsubishi Chemical Kurosaki 2–5 Hitachi
- Yawata Steel 1–0 Kyoto Shiko
- Otsuka Pharmaceutical 1–2 Fujita Industries
- Yamaha Motors 5–1 Yomiuri Junior
- PJM Futures 5–0 TDK
- Toshiba 1–0 NTT Kansai
- Juntendo University 1–0 Furukawa Electric
- Matsushita Electric 0–1 Mazda
- Tanabe Pharmaceuticals 1–2 NKK
- Meiji University 4–2 YKK
- Fujieda City Hall 0–2 All Nippon Airways

=== 2nd round ===
- Nissan Motors 4–0 Cosmo Oil
- Honda 1–3 Yanmar Diesel
- Yomiuri 1–0 Hitachi
- Yawata Steel 1–3 Fujita Industries
- Yamaha Motors 1–0 PJM Futures
- Toshiba 3–0 Juntendo University
- Mazda 1–0 NKK
- Meiji University 0–3 All Nippon Airways

=== Quarterfinals ===
- Nissan Motors 1–0 Yanmar Diesel
- Yomiuri 1–0 Fujita Industries
- Yamaha Motors 2–1 Toshiba
- Mazda 1–2 All Nippon Airways

=== Semifinals ===
- Nissan Motors 1–0 Yomiuri
- Yamaha Motors 1–1 (PK 4–2) All Nippon Airways

=== Final ===
- Nissan Motors 3–2 Yamaha Motors

Nissan Motors won the championship Excluded from the Asian Cup Winners' Cup 1990.
