= 1991 Emperor's Cup =

Tournament details
- Country: Japan

Final positions
- Champions: Nissan Motors
- Runners-up: Yomiuri Club
- Semifinalists: Toshiba; Honda Giken

The 71st Emperor's Cup was held from December 14, 1991, to January 1, 1992. It was the last cup involving clubs from the old Japan Soccer League before it was reorganized into the J.League. The tournament was won by Nissan Motors, now known as Yokohama F. Marinos. The 12 JSL First Division clubs qualified automatically, while the other clubs qualified for the first round via regional qualifying cups.

== First round ==
Tie no	Home team	Score	Away team
1	Yomiuri Club	3–2	Yanmar Diesel
2	Nippon Steel	1–4	Fujita Industries
3	East Japan JR Furukawa	2–0	Fukuoka University
4	Osaka University of Health and Sport Sciences	1–4	Yamaha Motors
5	Toyota Motors	3–0	Keio University
6	Nippon Denso	1–6	Hitachi
7	Kyoto Shiko Club	1–5	Otsuka Pharmaceutical
8	Juntendo University	0–4	Toshiba
9	Honda Giken	2–1	Fujitsu
10	YKK	0–1	PJM Futures
11	Mitsubishi Motors	1–0	Osaka University of Commerce
12	Shin Nittetsu Muroran	0–5	Matsushita
13	ANA	0–1	Kawasaki Steel
14	Waseda University	1–2	Mazda
15	Yamagata Nippon Denki	3–3	Kokushikan University
Kokushikan won 4 – 5 on penalties
16	Mie Teachers	0–9	Nissan Motors

== Second round ==
Tie no	Home team	Score	Away team
1	Yomiuri Club	2–0	Fujita Industries
2	East Japan JR Furukawa	1–0	Yamaha Motors
3	Toyota Motors	1–2	Hitachi
4	Otsuka Pharmaceutical	0–1	Toshiba
5	Honda Giken	2–1	PJM Futures
6	Mitsubishi Motors	1–0	Matsushita
7	Kawasaki Steel	1–1	Mazda
Kawasaki Steel won 4 – 2 on penalties
8	Kokushikan University	1–5	Nissan Motors

== Quarterfinals ==
Tie no	Home team	Score	Away team
1	Yomiuri Club	2–0	East Japan JR Furukawa
3	Hitachi	0–2	Toshiba
5	Honda Giken	2–2	Mitsubishi Motors
Honda won 4 – 3 on penalties
7	Kawasaki Steel	1–2	Nissan Motors

== Semifinals ==
Tie no	Home team	Score	Away team
1	Yomiuri Club	1–0	Toshiba
5	Honda Giken	1–1	Nissan Motors
Nissan won 2 – 4 on penalties

== Final ==
1992-01-01

Yomiuri Club	1 –4 (AET)	Nissan Motors

Tokyo National Stadium, Tokyo
