= 1989 JSL Cup =

Tournament details
- Country: Japan

Final positions
- Champions: Nissan Motors
- Runners-up: Yamaha Motors
- Semifinalists: Fujita Industries; Yomiuri

Statistics of JSL Cup in the 1989 season.

== Overview ==
It was contested by 28 teams, and Nissan Motors won the championship.

== Results ==
=== 1st round ===
- Kawasaki Steel 3-2 Mazda Auto Hiroshima
- All Nippon Airways 2-1 Kofu
- NKK 4-0 Osaka Gas
- Fujita Industries 1-1 Kyoto Shiko
- Furukawa Electric 1-0 Fujitsu
- Matsushita Electric 0-0 (PK 1–3) Cosmo Oil
- Yomiuri 2-0 Nippon Steel
- Toyota Motors 3-0 Toho Titanium
- NTT Kanto 3-3 (PK 5–4) Tanabe Pharmaceuticals
- Yamaha Motors 3-0 Sumitomo Metals
- Hitachi 1-1 (PK 2–4) Mazda
- Honda 6-0 Teijin

=== 2nd round ===
- Nissan Motors 3-2 Kawasaki Steel
- All Nippon Airways 2-1 NKK
- Fujita Industries 4-2 Furukawa Electric
- Cosmo Oil 1-4 Yanmar Diesel
- Mitsubishi Motors 0-2 Yomiuri
- Toyota Motors 1-1 (PK 5–4) NTT Kanto
- Yamaha Motors 1-0 Mazda
- Honda 1-1 Toshiba

=== Quarterfinals ===
- Nissan Motors 2-0 All Nippon Airways
- Fujita Industries 1-0 Yanmar Diesel
- Yomiuri 4-2 Toyota Motors
- Yamaha Motors 2-1 Toshiba

=== Semifinals ===
- Nissan Motors 2-1 Fujita Industries
- Yomiuri 0-1 Yamaha Motors

=== Final ===
Nissan Motors 1-0 Yamaha Motors

Nissan Motors won the championship
