= 1990 JSL Cup =

Tournament details
- Country: Japan

Final positions
- Champions: Nissan Motors
- Runners-up: Furukawa Electric
- Semifinalists: All Nippon Airways; Honda

Statistics of JSL Cup in the 1990 season.

== Overview ==
It was contested by 28 teams, and Nissan Motors won the championship.

== Results ==
=== 1st round ===
- Toyota Motors 2-0 Kawasaki Steel
- NKK 3-0 Toho Titanium
- Mazda 2-2 (PK 4–3) Kyoto Shiko
- All Nippon Airways 4-0 Nippon Steel
- Matsushita Electric 1-2 Fujitsu
- Hitachi 1-1 (PK 3–2) Sumitomo Metals
- Toshiba 3-0 Tanabe Pharmaceuticals
- Furukawa Electric 4-1 Kofu
- Yanmar Diesel 1-0 Mitsubishi Motors
- NTT Kanto 2-0 Osaka Gas
- Honda 2-1 Yomiuri Juniors
- Cosmo Oil 2-0 Otsuka Pharmaceutical

=== 2nd round ===
- Nissan Motors 3-0 Toyota Motors
- NKK 0-3 Mazda
- All Nippon Airways 1-1 (PK 4–2) Fujitsu
- Hitachi 0-4 Yomiuri
- Yamaha Motors 1-0 Toshiba
- Furukawa Electric 1-1 (PK 4–1) Yanmar Diesel
- NTT Kanto 0-2 Honda
- Cosmo Oil 3-1 Fujita Industries

=== Quarterfinals ===
- Nissan Motors 1-0 Mazda
- All Nippon Airways 1-0 Yomiuri
- Yamaha Motors 1-1 (PK 4–5) Furukawa Electric
- Honda 1-0 Cosmo Oil

=== Semifinals ===
- Nissan Motors 1-0 All Nippon Airways
- Furukawa Electric 0-0 (PK 4–3) Honda

=== Final ===
- Nissan Motors 3-1 Furukawa Electric

Nissan Motors won the championship
