= Masahiro =

- Gender: Male

Origin
- Origin: Japanese
- Meaning: Different meanings depending on the kanji used

Masahiro is a masculine Japanese given name. Notable people with the name include:

- Abe Masahiro (阿部 正弘; 1819–1857), Japanese councillor (Rōjū)
- Masahiro Abe (阿部 真宏; born 1978), Japanese baseball player
- Masahiro Akimoto (footballer) (秋元 雅博; born 1979), Japanese footballer
- Masahiro Akimoto (ski jumper) (秋元 正博; born 1956), Japanese ski jumper
- Masahiro Anbe (安部 真弘; born 1983), Japanese artist
- Masahiro Ando (footballer) (安藤 正裕; born 1972), Japanese footballer
- Masahiro Andoh (安藤 まさひろ; born 1954), Japanese guitarist and composer
- Masahiro Araki (荒木 雅博; born 1977), Japanese baseball player
- Masahiro Chono (蝶野 正洋; born 1963), American-Japanese wrestler
- Masahiro Endo (遠藤 雅大; born 1970), Japanese footballer
- Masahiro Fukuda (福田 正博; born 1966), Japanese footballer
- Masahiro Fukasawa (深澤 仁博; born 1977), Japanese footballer
- Masahiro Futahashi (二橋 正弘; born 1941), Japanese politician
- Masahiro Hamazaki (浜崎 昌弘; 1940–2011), Japanese footballer
- Masahiro Hasemi (長谷見 昌弘; born 1945), Japanese racing driver
- Masahiro Hayama (早間 雅博; 1910–?), Japanese ice hockey player
- Masahiro Imamura (今村 雅弘; born 1947), Japanese politician
- Masahiro Inoue (井上 正大; born 1989) actor
- Masahiro Ishii (石井 正弘; born 1945), Japanese politician
- Masahiro Ito (伊藤 暢達; born 1972), Japanese video game artist
- Masahiro Itō (伊藤 昌弘; born 1992), Japanese voice actor and singer
- Masahiro Kamiya (神谷 まさひろ; born 1963), Japanese actor and ex-child actor
- Masahiro Kanagawa (金川 真大; born 1983), Japanese murderer
- Masahiro Kaneko (born 1991), Japanese footballer
- Masahiro Kano (born 1977), Japanese footballer
- Masahiro Kawai (川相 昌弘; born 1964), Japanese baseball player
- Masahiro Kawasaki (川崎 真弘; 1949–2006), Japanese musician and composer
- Masahiro Kazuma (數馬 正浩; born 1982), Japanese footballer
- Masahiro Kikuno (菊野 昌宏; born 1983), Japanese watchmaker
- Masahiro Kobayashi (actor) (小林 正寛; born 1971), Japanese actor and voice actor
- Masahiro Kobayashi (director) (小林 政広; born 1954), Japanese film director
- Masahiro Koga (古賀 正紘; born 1978), Japanese footballer
- Masahiro Koishikawa (小石川 正弘; born 1952), Japanese astronomer
- Kongō Masahiro (金剛 正裕; born 1948), Japanese sumo wrestler
- Masahiro Kotaka (小高 正宏; born 1960), Japanese weightlifter
- Masahiro Kunda (薫田 真広; born 1966), Japanese rugby union player and coach
- Masahiro Kuramoto (倉本 昌弘; born 1955), Japanese golfer
- Masahiro Kuranuki (倉貫 匡弘; born 1982), Japanese actor
- Masahiro Makino (マキノ 雅弘; 1908–1993), Japanese film director
- Masahiro Matsuoka (松岡 昌宏; born 1977), Japanese drummer and actor
- Masahiro Miyashita (宮下 真洋; born 1975), Japanese footballer
- Masahiro Momitani (籾谷 真弘; born 1981), Japanese footballer
- Masahiro Mori (ceramic designer) (森 正洋; 1927–2005), Japanese ceramic designer
- Masahiro Mori (roboticist) (森 政弘; born 1927), Japanese roboticist
- Masahiro Morioka (森岡 正博; born 1958), Japanese philosopher
- Masahiro Morioka (politician) (森岡 正宏), Japanese politician
- Masahiro Motoki (本木 雅弘; born 1965), Japanese actor
- Masahiro Mukai (向井雅浩), Japanese director
- Masahiro Nakai (中居 正広; born 1972), Japanese singer, actor and host
- Masahiro Narita (成田 正弘; born 1994), Japanese basketball player
- Masahiro Nasukawa (那須川 将大; born 1986), Japanese footballer
- Masahiro Nojima (野島正弘; born 1971), Japanese baseball player
- Masahiro Nonaka (野中 政宏; born 1968), Japanese voice actor
- Masahiro Ōhashi (大橋 正博; born 1981), Japanese footballer
- Masahiro Okamoto (岡本 昌弘; born 1983), Japanese footballer
- Masahiro Ota (born 1970), Japanese footballer
- Ōuchi Masahiro (大内 政弘; 1446–1495), Japanese daimyō
- Masahiro Sakurai (桜井 政博; born 1970), Japanese video game designer
- Masahiro Sato (佐藤 真弘; born 1936), Japanese ice hockey player
- Masahiro Sayama (佐山 雅弘; 1953–2018), Japanese pianist
- Masahiro Sekita (関田 誠大; born 1993), Japanese volleyball player
- Masahiro Shimizu (清水 雅広; born 1964), Japanese motorcycle racer
- Masahiro Shimmyo (born 1972), Japanese footballer
- Masahiro Shinoda (篠田 正浩; 1931–2025), Japanese film director
- Masahiro Sukigara (鋤柄 昌宏; born 1966), Japanese footballer
- Masahiro Tabata (田端 正広; born 1940), Japanese politician
- Masahiro Takahashi (高橋 昌大; born 1985), Japanese footballer
- Masahiro Takamatsu (高松 正裕; born 1982), Japanese judoka
- Masahiro Takashima (髙嶋 政宏; born 1965), Japanese actor
- Takatsukasa Masahiro (鷹司 政熙; 1761–1841), Japanese court noble
- Masahiro Takatsuki (高月 正宏; born 1942), Japanese rower
- Tamanoumi Masahiro (玉の海 正洋; 1944–1971), Japanese sumo wrestler
- Masahiro Tanaka (田中 将大; born 1988), Japanese baseball player
- Tokitsuumi Masahiro (時津海 正博; born 1973), Japanese sumo wrestler
- Masahiro Usui (碓井 将大; born 1991), Japanese actor
- Masahiro Wada (和田 昌裕; born 1965), Japanese footballer
- Masahiro Yamada (screenwriter) (山田 正弘; 1931–2005), Japanese screenwriter and poet
- Masahiro Yamada (sociologist) (山田 昌弘; born 1957), Japanese sociologist
- Masahiro Yamamoto (baseball) (山本 昌; born 1965), Japanese baseball player
- Masahiro Yamamoto (kickboxer) (山本 真弘; born 1983), Japanese kickboxer
- Masahiro Yamanaka (山中 真尋), Japanese voice actor
- Masahiro Yanagida (柳田 将洋), Japanese volleyball player
- Masahiro Yasuhara (安原 昌弘; born 1963), Japanese cyclist
- Masahiro Yasuoka (安岡 正篤; 1898–1983), Japanese scholar
- Masahiro Yoshimura (吉村 昌弘; 1936–2003), Japanese swimmer

== Swordsmiths ==
One of several historical Katana swordsmiths (and the swords crafted by them), including:

- Ōsuminojō Masahiro (大隅掾正弘), a disciple of Horikawa Kunihiro
- Hojōji Masahiro (法城寺正弘), latter half 17th century
- Kawachidaijō Masahiro (河内大掾正広), a.k.a. Hizen Masahiro I; a disciple of Hizen Tadayoshi. See List of Wazamono for this and the preceding swordmaker

== See also ==
- Masahiro (株式会社マサヒロ), a kitchen knife manufacturer based in Seki, Gifu, and its Masahiro (正広) line of knives.
- Masahiro (正広), a trade brand of inexpensive katana for the North American market, manufactured by several Chinese workshops.
