= Jun Mizukoshi =

Japanese footballer and manager

Jun Mizukoshi 水越 潤
Personal information
- Full name: Jun Mizukoshi
- Date of birth: January 15, 1975 (age 51)
- Place of birth: Uda, Nara, Japan
- Height: 1.71 m (5 ft 7 1/2 in)
- Position: Midfielder

Youth career
- 1990–1992: Tenri High School
- 1993–1996: Tenri University

Senior career*
Years	Team	Apps	(Gls)
1997	Takada FC		
1997–1999	Albirex Niigata		
2000	Jatco TT	17	(3)
2001	EHC Hoensbroek		
2001–2005	Ventforet Kofu	142	(13)
2006–2007	New Wave Kitakyushu	30	(3)
2006	→TDK (loan)	0	(0)
2008	Diablossa Takada FC	9	(1)
2008–2010	Nara Club	2	(0)
Total		200	(20)

Managerial career
- 2013: Nara Club
- * Club domestic league appearances and goals

Jun Mizukoshi (水越 潤, Mizukoshi Jun; born January 15, 1975) is a former Japanese football player and manager.

== Playing career ==
Mizukoshi was born in Uda on January 15, 1975. After graduating from Tenri University, he joined Prefectural Leagues club Takada FC (later Diablossa Takada FC) in 1997. In October 1997, he moved to Regional Leagues club Albirex Niigata. He played many matches and the club was promoted to Japan Football League from 1998 and J2 League from 1999. In 2000, he moved to Japan Football League club Jatco TT. In 2001, he moved to Netherlands and joined EHC Hoensbroek. In June 2001, he returned to Japan and joined J2 club Ventforet Kofu. He became a regular player as right midfielder. Although the club finished at bottom place in 2001, through at middle place, the club won the 3rd place in 2005 and was promoted to J1 League from 2006. However he moved to Regional Leagues club New Wave Kitakyushu in 2006 and played many matches. In October 2006, he moved to Regional Leagues club TDK on loan. In 2007, he returned to New Wave Kitakyushu. In 2008, he moved to his first club Diablossa Takada FC in Regional Leagues. In November 2008, he moved to Prefectural Leagues club Nara Club. The club was promoted to Regional Leagues from 2009. He retired end of 2010 season.

== Coaching career ==
In October 2013, Mizukoshi became a manager for Regional Leagues club Nara Club as Jiro Yabe successor. He managed the club until end of 2013 season

== Career statistics ==
Appearances and goals by club, season and competition
Club	Season	League			Emperor's Cup		J.League Cup		Total	
Club	Season	Division	Apps	Goals	Apps	Goals	Apps	Goals	Apps	Goals
Takada FC	1997	Prefectural Leagues								
Albirex Niigata	1997	Regional Leagues								
Albirex Niigata	1998	Football League	29	2	3	0	—		32	2
Albirex Niigata	1999	J2 League	35	2	3	0	1	0	39	2
Jatco TT	2000	Football League	17	3	3	0	—		20	3
Ventforet Kofu	2001	J2 League	9	0	2	0	0	0	11	0
Ventforet Kofu	2002	J2 League	33	4	3	0	—		36	4
Ventforet Kofu	2003	J2 League	44	5	3	1	—		47	6
Ventforet Kofu	2004	J2 League	29	3	1	0	—		30	3
Ventforet Kofu	2005	J2 League	27	1	1	0	—		28	1
New Wave Kitakyushu	2006	Regional Leagues	14	0	—		—		14	0
TDK	2006	Regional Leagues	0	0	0	0	—		0	0
New Wave Kitakyushu	2007	Regional Leagues	16	3	—		—		16	3
Diablossa Takada FC	2008	Regional Leagues	9	1	—		—		9	1
Nara Club	2008	Prefectural Leagues	0	0	—		—		0	0
Nara Club	2009	Regional Leagues	2	0	2	0	—		4	0
Nara Club	2010	Regional Leagues	0	0	0	0	—		0	0
Career total			264	24	21	0	1	0	286	24
