= Hideaki Matsuura =

Japanese footballer

Hideaki Matsuura 松裏 英明
Personal information
- Full name: Hideaki Matsuura
- Date of birth: June 25, 1981 (age 45)
- Place of birth: Kyoto, Japan
- Height: 1.76 m (5 ft 9 1/2 in)
- Position: Defender

Youth career
- 1997–1999: Júbilo Iwata

Senior career*
Years	Team	Apps	(Gls)
2000	Peñarol		
2001	Ventforet Kofu	13	(0)
2002–2003	Jatco	17	(1)
2005	Denso	28	(1)
2006	Shizuoka FC		
2007	Sagawa Printing		
2008	AC Nagano Parceiro		
- * Club domestic league appearances and goals

Hideaki Matsuura (松裏 英明, Matsuura Hideaki; born June 25, 1981) is a former Japanese football player.

== Playing career ==
Matsuura was born in Kyoto on June 25, 1981. After playing at Júbilo Iwata youth team, he moved to Uruguayan club Peñarol in 2000. In 2001, he returned to Japan and joined J2 League club Ventforet Kofu. In 2002, he moved to Japan Football League (JFL) club Jatco. Although he played in 2 seasons, he could not play many matches and left the club end of 2003 season. After 1 year blank, he joined JFL club Denso and played many matches. From 2006, he played for Shizuoka FC (2006), Sagawa Printing (2007) and AC Nagano Parceiro (2008). He retired end of 2008 season.

== Career statistics ==
Appearances and goals by club, season and competition
Club	Season	League			Emperor's Cup		J.League Cup		Total	
Club	Season	Division	Apps	Goals	Apps	Goals	Apps	Goals	Apps	Goals
Ventforet Kofu	2001	J2 League	13	0			1	0	14	0
Jatco	2002	Football League	9	1	—		—		9	1
Jatco	2003	Football League	8	0	—		—		8	0
Denso	2005	Football League	28	1			—		28	1
Career total			58	2	0	0	1	0	59	2
