= Aoba =

Aoba or AOBA may refer to:

== Places ==
- Aoba Island, also known as Ambae, Vanuatu
- Aoba-ku, Sendai, a ward of the city of Sendai, Japan
  - Aoba-dōri Station, a railway station in Sendai
- Aoba-ku, Yokohama, a ward of the city of Yokohama, Japan

== Other uses ==
- 4292 Aoba, an asteroid
- American Osteopathic Board of Anesthesiology
- Aoba (surname), includes a list of people with the surname
- Aoba (train), the name of a train service in Japan
- Japanese cruiser Aoba
