= 2004 Ventforet Kofu season =

Ventforet Kofu
2004 season
- Manager: Hideki Matsunaga
- Stadium: Kose Sports Park Stadium
- J. League 2: 7th
- Emperor's Cup: 4th Round
- Top goalscorer: Baron (14)
| Home colours | Away colours |

During the 2004 season, Ventforet Kofu competed in the J. League 2, in which they finished 7th.

== Competitions ==
| Competitions | Position |
|---|---|
| J. League 2 | 7th / 12 clubs |
| Emperor's Cup | 4th Round |

== League table ==
| Pos | Team | Pld | W | D | L | GF | GA | GD | Pts |
|---|---|---|---|---|---|---|---|---|---|
| 5 | Kyoto Purple Sanga | 44 | 19 | 12 | 13 | 65 | 53 | +12 | 69 |
| 6 | Vegalta Sendai | 44 | 15 | 14 | 15 | 62 | 66 | −4 | 59 |
| 7 | Ventforet Kofu | 44 | 15 | 13 | 16 | 51 | 46 | +5 | 58 |
| 8 | Yokohama FC | 44 | 10 | 22 | 12 | 42 | 50 | −8 | 52 |
| 9 | Mito HollyHock | 44 | 6 | 19 | 19 | 33 | 60 | −27 | 37 |

Updated to match(es) played on November 27, 2004. Source: J. League Division 2
Rules for classification: 1) points; 2) goal difference; 3) number of goals scored.

== Domestic results ==
=== J. League 2 ===
| Match | Date | Venue | Opponents | Score |
|---|---|---|---|---|
| 1 | 2004.. | [[]] | [[]] | - |
| 2 | 2004.. | [[]] | [[]] | - |
| 3 | 2004.. | [[]] | [[]] | - |
| 4 | 2004.. | [[]] | [[]] | - |
| 5 | 2004.. | [[]] | [[]] | - |
| 6 | 2004.. | [[]] | [[]] | - |
| 7 | 2004.. | [[]] | [[]] | - |
| 8 | 2004.. | [[]] | [[]] | - |
| 9 | 2004.. | [[]] | [[]] | - |
| 10 | 2004.. | [[]] | [[]] | - |
| 11 | 2004.. | [[]] | [[]] | - |
| 12 | 2004.. | [[]] | [[]] | - |
| 13 | 2004.. | [[]] | [[]] | - |
| 14 | 2004.. | [[]] | [[]] | - |
| 15 | 2004.. | [[]] | [[]] | - |
| 16 | 2004.. | [[]] | [[]] | - |
| 17 | 2004.. | [[]] | [[]] | - |
| 18 | 2004.. | [[]] | [[]] | - |
| 19 | 2004.. | [[]] | [[]] | - |
| 20 | 2004.. | [[]] | [[]] | - |
| 21 | 2004.. | [[]] | [[]] | - |
| 22 | 2004.. | [[]] | [[]] | - |
| 23 | 2004.. | [[]] | [[]] | - |
| 24 | 2004.. | [[]] | [[]] | - |
| 25 | 2004.. | [[]] | [[]] | - |
| 26 | 2004.. | [[]] | [[]] | - |
| 27 | 2004.. | [[]] | [[]] | - |
| 28 | 2004.. | [[]] | [[]] | - |
| 29 | 2004.. | [[]] | [[]] | - |
| 30 | 2004.. | [[]] | [[]] | - |
| 31 | 2004.. | [[]] | [[]] | - |
| 32 | 2004.. | [[]] | [[]] | - |
| 33 | 2004.. | [[]] | [[]] | - |
| 34 | 2004.. | [[]] | [[]] | - |
| 35 | 2004.. | [[]] | [[]] | - |
| 36 | 2004.. | [[]] | [[]] | - |
| 37 | 2004.. | [[]] | [[]] | - |
| 38 | 2004.. | [[]] | [[]] | - |
| 39 | 2004.. | [[]] | [[]] | - |
| 40 | 2004.. | [[]] | [[]] | - |
| 41 | 2004.. | [[]] | [[]] | - |
| 42 | 2004.. | [[]] | [[]] | - |
| 43 | 2004.. | [[]] | [[]] | - |
| 44 | 2004.. | [[]] | [[]] | - |

=== Emperor's Cup ===
| Match | Date | Venue | Opponents | Score |
|---|---|---|---|---|
| 3rd Round | 2004.. | [[]] | [[]] | - |
| 4th Round | 2004.. | [[]] | [[]] | - |

== Player statistics ==
| No. | Pos. | Player | D.o.B. (Age) | Height / Weight | J. League 2 | | Emperor's Cup | | Total | |
| No. | Pos. | Player | D.o.B. (Age) | Height / Weight | Apps | Goals | Apps | Goals | Apps | Goals |
|---|---|---|---|---|---|---|---|---|---|---|
| 1 | GK | Kensaku Abe | May 13, 1980 (aged 23) | cm / kg | 39 | 0 | | | | |
| 2 | DF | Hideaki Tominaga | August 27, 1976 (aged 27) | cm / kg | 38 | 3 | | | | |
| 3 | DF | Takuma Tsuda | October 4, 1980 (aged 23) | cm / kg | 29 | 4 | | | | |
| 4 | DF | Hideomi Yamamoto | June 26, 1980 (aged 23) | cm / kg | 18 | 1 | | | | |
| 5 | DF | Yukihiro Aoba | July 26, 1979 (aged 24) | cm / kg | 34 | 0 | | | | |
| 6 | DF | Kenji Nakada | October 4, 1973 (aged 30) | cm / kg | 4 | 0 | | | | |
| 7 | MF | Hiroyuki Dobashi | November 27, 1977 (aged 26) | cm / kg | 32 | 1 | | | | |
| 8 | MF | Kazuki Kuranuki | November 10, 1978 (aged 25) | cm / kg | 41 | 1 | | | | |
| 9 | FW | Daisuke Sudo | April 25, 1977 (aged 26) | cm / kg | 24 | 3 | | | | |
| 10 | MF | Ken Fujita | August 27, 1979 (aged 24) | cm / kg | 28 | 2 | | | | |
| 11 | FW | Takafumi Ogura | July 6, 1973 (aged 30) | cm / kg | 40 | 6 | | | | |
| 13 | MF | Hirotaka Uchibayashi | June 27, 1983 (aged 20) | cm / kg | 5 | 0 | | | | |
| 14 | MF | Katsuya Ishihara | October 2, 1978 (aged 25) | cm / kg | 36 | 3 | | | | |
| 15 | DF | Alair | January 27, 1982 (aged 22) | cm / kg | 31 | 1 | | | | |
| 16 | FW | Baron | January 19, 1974 (aged 30) | cm / kg | 23 | 14 | | | | |
| 16 | FW | Careca | April 13, 1983 (aged 20) | cm / kg | 5 | 0 | | | | |
| 17 | MF | Toshiki Chino | July 19, 1985 (aged 18) | cm / kg | 7 | 0 | | | | |
| 18 | DF | Takafumi Kanazawa | April 25, 1981 (aged 22) | cm / kg | 3 | 0 | | | | |
| 19 | DF | Yosuke Ikehata | June 7, 1979 (aged 24) | cm / kg | 36 | 0 | | | | |
| 20 | MF | Jun Mizukoshi | January 15, 1975 (aged 29) | cm / kg | 29 | 3 | | | | |
| 21 | GK | Torashi Shimazu | August 20, 1978 (aged 25) | cm / kg | 0 | 0 | | | | |
| 22 | GK | Daisuke Matsushita | October 31, 1981 (aged 22) | cm / kg | 3 | 0 | | | | |
| 23 | FW | Kotaro Yamazaki | October 19, 1978 (aged 25) | cm / kg | 18 | 5 | | | | |
| 24 | DF | Kazuki Tsuda | July 26, 1982 (aged 21) | cm / kg | 1 | 0 | | | | |
| 25 | MF | Kenta Suzuki | September 16, 1985 (aged 18) | cm / kg | 5 | 0 | | | | |
| 26 | FW | Taro Hasegawa | August 17, 1979 (aged 24) | cm / kg | 17 | 3 | | | | |
| 27 | FW | Hidehito Shirao | September 30, 1980 (aged 23) | cm / kg | 8 | 1 | | | | |
| 28 | MF | Shinya Nasu | December 29, 1978 (aged 25) | cm / kg | 11 | 0 | | | | |
| 29 | MF | Makoto Watanabe | September 25, 1980 (aged 23) | cm / kg | 2 | 0 | | | | |
| 30 | GK | Yuya Satō | February 10, 1986 (aged 18) | cm / kg | 3 | 0 | | | | |
| 31 | MF | Emerson | March 21, 1978 (aged 25) | cm / kg | 0 | 0 | | | | |
| 31 | DF | Lê | July 6, 1979 (aged 24) | cm / kg | 6 | 0 | | | | |
| 32 | DF | Arata Sugiyama | July 25, 1980 (aged 23) | cm / kg | 22 | 0 | | | | |
| 33 | DF | Ichizo Nakata | April 19, 1973 (aged 30) | cm / kg | 5 | 0 | | | | |
| 33 | MF | Hirotoshi Yokoyama | May 9, 1975 (aged 28) | cm / kg | 12 | 0 | | | | |

== Other pages ==
- (in Japanese) J. League official site
