= Hidehito =

- Gender: Male

Origin
- Origin: Japanese
- Meaning: Different meanings depending on the kanji used

Hidehito (written: 秀人 or 英飛人) is a masculine Japanese given name. Notable people with the name include:

- Hayateumi Hidehito (追風海 英飛人; born 1975), Japanese sumo wrestler
- Hidehito Shirao (白尾 秀人; born 1980), Japanese footballer
