= Michiharu Otagiri =

Japanese footballer

Michiharu Otagiri 小田切 道治
Personal information
- Full name: Michiharu Otagiri
- Date of birth: 2 September 1978 (age 48)
- Place of birth: Ishikawa, Japan
- Height: 1.79 m (5 ft 10 1/2 in)
- Position: Defender

Team information
- Current team: Renofa Yamaguchi FC (manager)

Youth career
- 1994–1996: Toyama Daiichi High School

Senior career*
Years	Team	Apps	(Gls)
1997–1998	Kyoto Purple Sanga	0	(0)
1999	Ventforet Kofu	9	(0)
2000–2003	Jatco	87	(8)
2004–2009	Kataller Toyama	132	(7)
Total		228	(15)

Managerial career
- 2022–2025: Kataller Toyama
- 2025: Nara Club
- 2026–: Renofa Yamaguchi FC
- * Club domestic league appearances and goals

Michiharu Otagiri (小田切 道治, Otagiri Michiharu; born September 2, 1978) is a former Japanese football player. He is the currently manager of J3 League club Renofa Yamaguchi FC.

== Playing career ==
Otagiri was born in Ishikawa Prefecture on September 2, 1978. After graduating from high school, he joined J1 League club Kyoto Purple Sanga in 1997. However, he could not play at all in the match until 1998. In 1999, he was promoted to J2 League club, Ventforet Kofu. Although he played as left side back, he could not play many matches. In 2000, he moved to Japan Football League (JFL) club Jatco TT (later Jatco). He became a regular player and played many matches. However, the club was disbanded at the end of the 2003 season. In 2004, he moved to JFL clubYKK AP (later Kataller Toyama). He played as a regular player until 2007. Although his opportunity to play decreased in 2008, the club was promoted to J2 League in 2009. He retired at end of the 2009 season.

== Managerial career ==
In 2010, Otagiri became the coach of Kataller Toyama U-15.

== Club statistics ==
Club performance			League		Cup		League Cup		Total	
Season	Club	League	Apps	Goals	Apps	Goals	Apps	Goals	Apps	Goals
Japan			League		Emperor's Cup		J.League Cup		Total	
1997	Kyoto Purple Sanga	J1	0	0	0	0	0	0	0	0
1998	Kyoto Purple Sanga	J1	0	0	0	0	0	0	0	0
1999	Ventforet Kofu	J2	9	0	0	0	2	0	11	0
2000	Jatco TT	JFL	13	2	3	0	-		16	2
2001	Jatco TT	JFL	29	1	2	0	-		31	1
2002	Jatco	JFL	17	1	-		-		17	1
2003	Jatco	JFL	28	4	-		-		28	4
2004	YKK AP	JFL	19	0	-		-		19	0
2005	YKK AP	JFL	25	2	-		-		25	2
2006	YKK AP	JFL	31	2	3	0	-		34	2
2007	YKK AP	JFL	31	3	-		-		31	3
2008	Kataller Toyama	JFL	10	0	1	0	-		11	0
2009	Kataller Toyama	J2	16	0	0	0	-		16	0
Total			228	15	9	0	2	0	239	15

== Managerial statistics ==
As of 9 April 2023.

Team	From	To	Record				
Team	From	To	G	W	D	L	Win %
Kataller Toyama	19 September 2022	present	15	9	1	5	60.00
Total			15	9	1	5	60.00
