= Hayama (surname) =

Hayama (written: 葉山, 羽山, 端山, 早山, or 早間) is a Japanese surname. Notable people with the surname include:

- Go Hayama (端山 豪; born 1993), Japanese footballer
- Hiro Hayama (葉山 豪; born 1975), Japanese actor and model
- Ikumi Hayama (葉山 いくみ; born 1984), Japanese voice actress
- Masahiro Hayama (早間 雅博; 1910–?), Japanese ice hockey player
- Peggy Hayama (ペギー 葉山; 1933–2017), Japanese singer
- Reiko Hayama (葉山 レイコ; born 1969), Japanese actress
- Yoshiki Hayama (葉山 嘉樹; 1894–1945), Japanese writer

== Fictional characters ==
- Akira Hayama (葉山 アキラ), a character in the manga series Shokugeki no Sōma
- Hayato Hayama (葉山 隼人), a character in the light novel series My Youth Romantic Comedy Is Wrong, As I Expected
- Kotono Hayama (葉山 小十乃), a character in the anime series Saint October
- Nayu Hayama (葉山 奈由), protagonist of the manga series Chu-Bra!!
- Teru Hayama (葉山 照), a character in the manga series Three Leaves, Three Colors
- Umi Hayama (羽山 海己), a character in the visual novel Kono Aozora ni Yakusoku o
