= Zaizen =

Zaizen (written: 財前) is a Japanese surname. Notable people with the surname include:

- Atsushi Zaizen (財前 淳, born 1999), Japanese footballer
- Keiichi Zaizen (財前 恵一, born 1968), Japanese footballer
- Naomi Zaizen (財前 直見, born 1966), Japanese actress
- Nobuyuki Zaizen (財前 宣之, born 1976), Japanese footballer

== See also ==
- Ioan Zaizan (born 1983), Romanian runner
