= Yusaku Tanioku =

Japanese footballer

Yusaku Tanioku 谷奥 優作
Personal information
- Full name: Yusaku Tanioku
- Date of birth: October 18, 1978 (age 48)
- Place of birth: Nabari, Mie, Japan
- Height: 1.75 m (5 ft 9 in)
- Position: Defender

Youth career
- 1994–1996: Nabari Nishi High School

Senior career*
Years	Team	Apps	(Gls)
1997–2002	Ventforet Kofu	95	(2)
2003–2005	Tokushima Vortis	63	(0)
2006–2009	Sagawa Shiga	35	(0)
Total		193	(2)
- * Club domestic league appearances and goals

Yusaku Tanioku (谷奥 優作, Tanioku Yusaku; born October 18, 1978) is a former Japanese footballer.

== Playing career ==
Tanioku was born in Nabari on October 18, 1978. After graduating from high school, he joined Japan Football League club Ventforet Kofu in 1997. The club was promoted to new league J2 League from 1999. He played many matches from 1999 and became a regular player as side back in 2000. However the club finished at bottom place for 3 years in a row (1999-2001). In 2003, he moved to Japan Football League (JFL) club Otsuka Pharmaceutical (later Tokushima Vortis). He played many matches and the club won the champions in 2005 and was promoted to J2 from 2005. In 2006, he moved to JFL club Sagawa Express Osaka (later Sagawa Shiga). Although he played many matches in 2006, he could not play many matches from 2007 and retired at the end of the 2009 season.

== Club statistics ==
Club performance			League		Cup		League Cup		Total	
Season	Club	League	Apps	Goals	Apps	Goals	Apps	Goals	Apps	Goals
Japan			League		Emperor's Cup		J.League Cup		Total	
1997	Ventforet Kofu	Football League	0	0	0	0	-		0	0
1998	Ventforet Kofu	Football League	0	0	0	0	-		0	01
1999	Ventforet Kofu	J2 League	13	0	0	0	0	0	13	0
2000	Ventforet Kofu	J2 League	37	1	0	0	0	0	37	1
2001	Ventforet Kofu	J2 League	38	1	0	0	2	0	40	1
2002	Ventforet Kofu	J2 League	7	0	0	0	-		7	0
2003	Otsuka Pharmaceutical	Football League	20	0	3	0	-		23	0
2004	Otsuka Pharmaceutical	Football League	24	0	0	0	-		24	0
2005	Tokushima Vortis	J2 League	19	0	1	0	-		20	0
2006	Sagawa Express Osaka	Football League	19	0	-		-		19	0
2007	Sagawa Express	Football League	5	0	0	0	-		5	0
2008	Sagawa Shiga	Football League	8	0	0	0	-		8	0
2009	Sagawa Shiga	Football League	3	0	9	9	-		3	0
Total			193	2	4	0	2	0	199	2
