= Satoru Yoshida =

Japanese footballer

Satoru Yoshida 吉田 悟
Personal information
- Full name: Satoru Yoshida
- Date of birth: December 18, 1970 (age 55)
- Place of birth: Saitama, Japan
- Height: 1.80 m (5 ft 11 in)
- Position: Forward

Youth career
- 1986–1988: Kawagoe Higashi High School

Senior career*
Years	Team	Apps	(Gls)
1990–1994	Yokohama Marinos	2	(0)
1995–1997	Otsuka Pharmaceutical	76	(8)
1998–2001	Ventforet Kofu	75	(7)
Total		153	(15)

Managerial career
- 2011: Nara Club
Medal record
Yokohama Marinos
Runner-up	Japan Soccer League	1990/91
Runner-up	Japan Soccer League	1991/92
Winner	JSL Cup	1990
Winner	Emperor's Cup	1991
Winner	Emperor's Cup	1992
Runner-up	Emperor's Cup	1990
- * Club domestic league appearances and goals

Satoru Yoshida (吉田 悟, Yoshida Satoru; born December 18, 1970) is a former Japanese football player.

== Playing career ==
Yoshida was born in Saitama Prefecture on December 18, 1970. After graduating from high school, he joined Nissan Motors (later Yokohama Marinos) in 1990. Through reserve team, he joined top team in 1992. However he could hardly play in the match. In 1995, he moved to Japan Football League (JFL) club Otsuka Pharmaceutical and he played as regular player. In 1998, he moved to JFL club Ventforet Kofu. Although he did not play in the match in 1998 season, the club was promoted to new league J2 League in 1999. From 1999, he played many matches and retired end of 2001 season.

== Club statistics ==
Club performance			League		Cup		League Cup		Total	
Season	Club	League	Apps	Goals	Apps	Goals	Apps	Goals	Apps	Goals
Japan			League		Emperor's Cup		J.League Cup		Total	
1992	Yokohama Marinos	J1 League	-		0	0	0	0	0	0
1993	Yokohama Marinos	J1 League	0	0	0	0	0	0	0	0
1994	Yokohama Marinos	J1 League	2	0	0	0	0	0	2	0
1995	Otsuka Pharmaceutical	Football League	25	2			-		25	2
1996	Otsuka Pharmaceutical	Football League	22	3			-		22	3
1997	Otsuka Pharmaceutical	Football League	29	3			-		29	3
1998	Ventforet Kofu	Football League	0	0			-		0	0
1999	Ventforet Kofu	J2 League	24	4			0	0	24	4
2000	Ventforet Kofu	J2 League	21	0			2	0	23	0
2001	Ventforet Kofu	J2 League	30	3			1	0	31	0
Total			153	15	0	0	3	0	156	15

== Managerial statistics ==
Season	club	League								Cup
Season	club	rank	game	point	win	draw	lost	goal	goallost	Emperor's Cup
2011	Nara Club (Kansai Div.1)	Champion	14	35	11	2	1	42	13	first round
