= 2000 Ventforet Kofu season =

Ventforet Kofu
2000 season
- Manager: Yuji Tsukada
- Stadium: Kose Sports Park Stadium
- J.League 2: 11th
- Emperor's Cup: 4th Round
- J.League Cup: 1st Round
- Top goalscorer: Terumasa Kin (5)
Home colours	Away colours

2000 Ventforet Kofu season

== Competitions ==
Competitions	Position
J.League 2	11th / 11 clubs
Emperor's Cup	4th round
J.League Cup	1st round

== Domestic results ==
=== J.League 2 ===
1	bye

20 March 2000 2	Ventforet Kofu	0-3	Consadole Sapporo	Kose Sports Park Stadium
JST (UTC+09)

26 March 2000 3	Albirex Niigata	3-2	Ventforet Kofu	Niigata City Athletic Stadium
JST (UTC+09)

30 March 2000 4	Ventforet Kofu	1-0	Vegalta Sendai	Kose Sports Park Stadium
JST (UTC+09)

2 April 2000 5	Urawa Red Diamonds	3-1	Ventforet Kofu	Urawa Komaba Stadium
JST (UTC+09)

8 April 2000 6	Ventforet Kofu	1-3	Oita Trinita	Kose Sports Park Stadium
JST (UTC+09)

16 April 2000 7	Montedio Yamagata	4-2	Ventforet Kofu	Tsuruoka Komakihara Stadium
JST (UTC+09)

22 April 2000 8	Ventforet Kofu	0-3	Mito HollyHock	Nirasaki Central Park Stadium
JST (UTC+09)

30 April 2000 9	Shonan Bellmare	3-0	Ventforet Kofu	Hiratsuka Athletics Stadium
JST (UTC+09)

4 May 2000 10	Ventforet Kofu	1-2	Omiya Ardija	Kose Sports Park Stadium
JST (UTC+09)

7 May 2000 11	Sagan Tosu	1-1 (GG) (a.e.t.)	Ventforet Kofu	Tosu Stadium
JST (UTC+09)

12	bye

18 May 2000 13	Consadole Sapporo	2-1	Ventforet Kofu	Sapporo Atsubetsu Park Stadium
JST (UTC+09)

21 May 2000 14	Ventforet Kofu	1-2	Albirex Niigata	Kose Sports Park Stadium
JST (UTC+09)

28 May 2000 15	Vegalta Sendai	3-1	Ventforet Kofu	Sendai Stadium
JST (UTC+09)

1 June 2000 16	Ventforet Kofu	0-3	Urawa Red Diamonds	Kose Sports Park Stadium
JST (UTC+09)

4 June 2000 17	Oita Trinita	2-0	Ventforet Kofu	Saiki Stadium
JST (UTC+09)

11 June 2000 18	Ventforet Kofu	1-4	Montedio Yamagata	Kose Sports Park Stadium
JST (UTC+09)

17 June 2000 19	Mito HollyHock	2-0	Ventforet Kofu	Hitachinaka City Stadium
JST (UTC+09)

21 June 2000 20	Ventforet Kofu	1-2	Shonan Bellmare	Kose Sports Park Stadium
JST (UTC+09)

25 June 2000 21	Omiya Ardija	1-0	Ventforet Kofu	Omiya Football Stadium
JST (UTC+09)

2 July 2000 22	Ventforet Kofu	0-1	Sagan Tosu	Kose Sports Park Stadium
JST (UTC+09)

8 July 2000 23	Ventforet Kofu	1-2	Vegalta Sendai	Kose Sports Park Stadium
JST (UTC+09)

22 July 2000 24	Urawa Red Diamonds	3-0	Ventforet Kofu	Urawa Komaba Stadium
JST (UTC+09)

28 July 2000 25	Ventforet Kofu	2-3	Oita Trinita	Kose Sports Park Stadium
JST (UTC+09)

2 August 2000 26	Montedio Yamagata	4-1	Ventforet Kofu	Yamagata City Athletic Stadium
JST (UTC+09)

6 August 2000 27	Ventforet Kofu	0-1	Mito HollyHock	Fujihokuroku Park Stadium
JST (UTC+09)

12 August 2000 28	Shonan Bellmare	4-2	Ventforet Kofu	Hiratsuka Athletics Stadium
JST (UTC+09)

19 August 2000 29	Ventforet Kofu	1-2 (GG) (a.e.t.)	Omiya Ardija	Kose Sports Park Stadium
JST (UTC+09)

27 August 2000 30	Sagan Tosu	3-0	Ventforet Kofu	Tosu Stadium
JST (UTC+09)

31	bye

11 September 2000 32	Ventforet Kofu	0-2	Consadole Sapporo	Kose Sports Park Stadium
JST (UTC+09)

15 September 2000 33	Albirex Niigata	0-1	Ventforet Kofu	Niigata City Athletic Stadium
JST (UTC+09)

24 September 2000 34	Ventforet Kofu	0-1	Urawa Red Diamonds	Kose Sports Park Stadium
JST (UTC+09)

28 September 2000 35	Oita Trinita	4-1	Ventforet Kofu	Oita Athletic Stadium
JST (UTC+09)

1 October 2000 36	Ventforet Kofu	3-2	Montedio Yamagata	Fujihokuroku Park Stadium
JST (UTC+09)

8 October 2000 37	Mito HollyHock	2-1 (GG) (a.e.t.)	Ventforet Kofu	Hitachi Athletic Stadium
JST (UTC+09)

14 October 2000 38	Ventforet Kofu	2-1	Shonan Bellmare	Kose Sports Park Stadium
JST (UTC+09)

22 October 2000 39	Omiya Ardija	1-0	Ventforet Kofu	Omiya Football Stadium
JST (UTC+09)

29 October 2000 40	Ventforet Kofu	0-1	Sagan Tosu	Kose Sports Park Stadium
JST (UTC+09)

41	bye

12 November 2000 42	Consadole Sapporo	1-1 (GG) (a.e.t.)	Ventforet Kofu	Sapporo Atsubetsu Park Stadium
JST (UTC+09)

16 November 2000 43	Ventforet Kofu	0-0 (GG) (a.e.t.)	Albirex Niigata	Kose Sports Park Stadium
JST (UTC+09)

19 November 2000 44	Vegalta Sendai	0-1	Ventforet Kofu	Sendai Stadium
JST (UTC+09)

=== Emperor's Cup ===
25 November 2000 1st Round	Matsushita Electric IFC	0-4	Ventforet Kofu	Suzuka Sports Garden
JST (UTC+09)

3 December 2000 2nd Round	Ventforet Kofu	2-1 (GG) (a.e.t.)	Dohto University	Kose Sports Park Stadium
JST (UTC+09)

10 December 2000 3rd Round	FC Tokyo	0-1	Ventforet Kofu	Nishigaoka Soccer Stadium
JST (UTC+09)

17 December 2000 4th Round	JEF United Ichihara	3-1	Ventforet Kofu	Kochi Haruno Athletic Stadium
JST (UTC+09)

=== J.League Cup ===
12 April 2000 1st Round-1	Ventforet Kofu	0-2	Yokohama F. Marinos	Kose Sports Park Stadium
JST (UTC+09)

19 April 2000 1st Round-2	Yokohama F. Marinos	5-1 (7-1 agg.)	Ventforet Kofu	Yokohama Mitsuzawa Stadium
JST (UTC+09)

== Player statistics ==
No.	Pos.	Nat.	Player	D.o.B. (Age)	Height / Weight	J.League 2		Emperor's Cup		J.League Cup		Total	
No.	Pos.	Nat.	Player	D.o.B. (Age)	Height / Weight	Apps	Goals	Apps	Goals	Apps	Goals	Apps	Goals
1	GK	(Japan)	Takehisa Sakamoto	August 26, 1971 (aged 28)	cm / kg	0	0						
2	DF	(Japan)	Masahiro Kano	April 4, 1977 (aged 22)	cm / kg	18	0						
3	DF	(Japan)	Susumu Watanabe	October 10, 1973 (aged 26)	cm / kg	38	3						
4	MF	(Japan)	Makoto Kaneko	December 9, 1975 (aged 24)	cm / kg	34	2						
5	DF	(Japan)	Daisuke Ishihara	December 9, 1971 (aged 28)	cm / kg	29	4						
6	DF	(Japan)	Kenji Nakada	October 4, 1973 (aged 26)	cm / kg	37	1						
7	FW		Terumasa Kin	November 19, 1975 (aged 24)	cm / kg	31	5						
8	MF	(Japan)	Tatsuya Ai	April 17, 1968 (aged 31)	cm / kg	36	1						
9	FW	(Japan)	Satoru Yoshida	December 18, 1970 (aged 29)	cm / kg	21	0						
10	MF	(Brazil)	Antonio	November 16, 1970 (aged 29)	cm / kg	9	1						
11	MF	(Japan)	Masahiro Shimmyo	July 16, 1972 (aged 27)	cm / kg	33	2						
12	MF	(Japan)	Hiroyuki Dobashi	November 27, 1977 (aged 22)	cm / kg	30	3						
13	DF	(Japan)	Shinichi Fujita	April 10, 1973 (aged 26)	cm / kg	27	2						
14	MF	(Japan)	Yoshinobu Akao	October 3, 1975 (aged 24)	cm / kg	4	0						
15	DF	(Japan)	Yusaku Tanioku	October 18, 1978 (aged 21)	cm / kg	37	1						
16	MF	(Japan)	Fumiyuki Kanda	September 29, 1977 (aged 22)	cm / kg	13	0						
17	MF	(Japan)	Keita Tanzawa	December 27, 1977 (aged 22)	cm / kg	0	0						
18	FW	(Japan)	Daichi Fukushima	August 1, 1977 (aged 22)	cm / kg	4	0						
19	MF	(Japan)	Yohei Takayama	November 26, 1979 (aged 20)	cm / kg	0	0						
20	MF	(Japan)	Kazuki Kuranuki	November 10, 1978 (aged 21)	cm / kg	39	3						
21	GK	(Japan)	Tomohiko Ito	May 28, 1978 (aged 21)	cm / kg	38	0						
22	GK	(Japan)	Hiromasa Azuma	August 29, 1977 (aged 22)	cm / kg	2	0						
23	FW	(Brazil)	Luis	February 20, 1978 (aged 22)	cm / kg	13	3						
24	FW	(Japan)	Takuma Sugano	April 5, 1980 (aged 19)	cm / kg	20	3						
25	MF	(Romania)	Ovidiu Burcă	March 16, 1980 (aged 19)	cm / kg	16	1						
26	MF	(Japan)	Michihiro Tsuruta	January 4, 1968 (aged 32)	cm / kg	4	0						
27	DF		Kim Myung-Hwi	May 8, 1981 (aged 18)	cm / kg	5	0						
