= 2002 Ventforet Kofu season =

Ventforet Kofu
2002 season
- Manager: Takeshi Oki
- Stadium: Kose Sports Park Stadium
- J. League 2: 7th
- Emperor's Cup: 3rd Round
- Top goalscorer: Tomoyoshi Tsurumi (8); Yoshitaka Kageyama (8)
Home colours	Away colours

2002 Ventforet Kofu season

== Competitions ==
Competitions	Position
J. League 2	7th / 12 clubs
Emperor's Cup	3rd Round

== League table ==
Pos	Team	Pld	W	D	L	GF	GA	GD	Pts
5	Shonan Bellmare	44	16	16	12	46	43	+3	64
6	Omiya Ardija	44	14	17	13	52	42	+10	59
7	Ventforet Kofu	44	16	10	18	51	55	−4	58
8	Avispa Fukuoka	44	10	12	22	58	69	−11	42
9	Sagan Tosu	44	9	14	21	41	64	−23	41

Updated to match(es) played on November 24, 2002. Source: J.League Data Site
Rules for classification: 1) points; 2) goal difference; 3) number of goals scored.

== Domestic results ==
=== J. League 2 ===
Match	Date	Venue	Opponents	Score
1	2002.3.3	Mitsuzawa Stadium	Yokohama F.C.	2-3
2	2002.3.9	Kose Sports Stadium	Avispa Fukuoka	0-2
3	2002.3.16	Hitachinaka (ja:ひたちなか市総合運動公園陸上競技場)	Mito HollyHock	1-0
4	2002.3.21	Yamagata Park Stadium	Montedio Yamagata	3-2
5	2002.3.24	Kose Sports Stadium	Cerezo Osaka	1-3
6	2002.3.30	Kose Sports Stadium	Omiya Ardija	1-0
7	2002.4.6	Hiratsuka Athletics Stadium	Shonan Bellmare	0-0
8	2002.4.10	Kose Sports Stadium	Sagan Tosu	1-1
9	2002.4.13	Oita (ja:大分市営陸上競技場)	Oita Trinita	0-1
10	2002.4.20	Kose Sports Stadium	Albirex Niigata	1-3
11	2002.4.24	Kose Sports Stadium	Kawasaki Frontale	1-4
12	2002.4.27	Hakata no mori stadium	Avispa Fukuoka	1-1
13	2002.5.3	Kose Sports Stadium	Montedio Yamagata	1-0
14	2002.5.6	Ojiyama (ja:皇子山陸上競技場)	Cerezo Osaka	2-2
15	2002.5.11	Ōmiya Park Soccer Stadium	Omiya Ardija	1-3
16	2002.7.6	Kose Sports Stadium	Shonan Bellmare	0-2
17	2002.7.10	Tosu Stadium	Sagan Tosu	0-0
18	2002.7.13	Todoroki Athletics Stadium	Kawasaki Frontale	1-2
19	2002.7.20	Kose Sports Stadium	Yokohama F.C.	1-0
20	2002.7.24	Kose Sports Stadium	Oita Trinita	1-2
21	2002.7.27	Niigata Stadium	Albirex Niigata	0-1
22	2002.8.3	Kose Sports Stadium	Mito HollyHock	2-1
23	2002.8.7	Ōmiya Park Soccer Stadium	Omiya Ardija	0-3
24	2002.8.10	Kose Sports Stadium	Kawasaki Frontale	2-2
25	2002.8.17	Kose Sports Stadium	Sagan Tosu	0-0
26	2002.8.21	Oita (ja:大分市営陸上競技場)	Oita Trinita	1-0
27	2002.8.25	Kose Sports Stadium	Avispa Fukuoka	3-0
28	2002.8.31	Yumenoshima Stadium	Yokohama F.C.	1-1
29	2002.9.7	Hiratsuka Athletics Stadium	Shonan Bellmare	1-0
30	2002.9.11	Kose Sports Stadium	Albirex Niigata	2-1
31	2002.9.15	Yamagata Park Stadium	Montedio Yamagata	1-0
32	2002.9.21	Kose Sports Stadium	Cerezo Osaka	0-2
33	2002.9.25	Kasamatsu Stadium	Mito HollyHock	2-1
34	2002.9.29	Kose Sports Stadium	Omiya Ardija	2-3
35	2002.10.5	Kose Sports Stadium	Oita Trinita	1-2
36	2002.10.9	Niigata City Athletic Stadium	Albirex Niigata	1-1
37	2002.10.12	Kose Sports Stadium	Montedio Yamagata	3-0
38	2002.10.19	Hakata no mori stadium	Avispa Fukuoka	4-1
39	2002.10.23	Kose Sports Stadium	Mito HollyHock	1-0
40	2002.10.26	Nagai Stadium	Cerezo Osaka	0-0
41	2002.11.2	Kose Sports Stadium	Shonan Bellmare	0-1
42	2002.11.10	Tosu Stadium	Sagan Tosu	4-1
43	2002.11.16	Todoroki Athletics Stadium	Kawasaki Frontale	1-2
44	2002.11.24	Kose Sports Stadium	Yokohama F.C.	0-1

=== Emperor's Cup ===
Match	Date	Venue	Opponents	Score
1st Round	2002..	[[]]	Tsukuba University	3-1
2nd Round	2002..	[[]]	Alouette Kumamoto	2-0
3rd Round	2002..	[[]]	Vegalta Sendai	0-1

== Player statistics ==
No.	Pos.	Player	D.o.B. (Age)	Height / Weight	J. League 2		Emperor's Cup		Total	
No.	Pos.	Player	D.o.B. (Age)	Height / Weight	Apps	Goals	Apps	Goals	Apps	Goals
1	GK	Hiromasa Azuma	August 29, 1977 (aged 24)	cm / kg	0	0				
2	DF	Yusaku Tanioku	October 18, 1978 (aged 23)	cm / kg	7	0				
3	DF	Masahiro Kano	April 4, 1977 (aged 24)	cm / kg	12	0				
4	MF	Makoto Kaneko	December 9, 1975 (aged 26)	cm / kg	0	0				
5	DF	Masayoshi Yoshida	August 4, 1982 (aged 19)	cm / kg	2	0				
6	DF	Kenji Nakada	October 4, 1973 (aged 28)	cm / kg	23	1				
7	MF	Hiroyuki Dobashi	November 27, 1977 (aged 24)	cm / kg	26	1				
8	MF	Kazuki Kuranuki	November 10, 1978 (aged 23)	cm / kg	44	1				
9	FW	Manabu Komatsubara	April 2, 1981 (aged 20)	cm / kg	8	1				
10	MF	Ken Fujita	August 27, 1979 (aged 22)	cm / kg	33	5				
11	FW	Naoki Urata	June 27, 1974 (aged 27)	cm / kg	10	1				
13	MF	Tetsuya Oishi	November 26, 1979 (aged 22)	cm / kg	29	0				
14	MF	Katsuya Ishihara	October 2, 1978 (aged 23)	cm / kg	40	4				
15	MF	Yusuke Yoshizaki	June 12, 1981 (aged 20)	cm / kg	14	0				
16	FW	Hitoshi Matsushima	April 30, 1980 (aged 21)	cm / kg	24	1				
17	MF	Tomoyoshi Tsurumi	October 12, 1979 (aged 22)	cm / kg	41	8				
18	FW	Hayato Yano	October 29, 1980 (aged 21)	cm / kg	1	0				
19	MF	Takashi Ono	July 4, 1979 (aged 22)	cm / kg	0	0				
20	MF	Jun Mizukoshi	January 15, 1975 (aged 27)	cm / kg	33	4				
21	GK	Yusuke Kawakita	May 13, 1978 (aged 23)	cm / kg	9	0				
22	GK	Tatsuya Tsuruta	September 9, 1982 (aged 19)	cm / kg	36	0				
23	FW	Kosuke Suzuki	June 16, 1981 (aged 20)	cm / kg	7	0				
24	DF	Koichi Yokozeki	September 11, 1979 (aged 22)	cm / kg	5	0				
25	DF	Yukihiro Aoba	July 26, 1979 (aged 22)	cm / kg	43	0				
26	MF	Hiromitsu Hayashi	June 14, 1983 (aged 18)	cm / kg	0	0				
27	MF	Kenichi Ego	June 7, 1979 (aged 22)	cm / kg	1	0				
28	FW	Shinya Hoshido	October 4, 1978 (aged 23)	cm / kg	0	0				
28	MF	Shinya Nasu	December 29, 1978 (aged 23)	cm / kg	28	4				
29	FW	Yoshitaka Kageyama	March 31, 1978 (aged 23)	cm / kg	38	8				
30	MF	Reiji Nakajima	June 28, 1979 (aged 22)	cm / kg	1	0				
31	MF	Naoki Makino	November 11, 1976 (aged 25)	cm / kg	4	0				
32	DF	Yosuke Ikehata	June 7, 1979 (aged 22)	cm / kg	36	1				
33	DF	Tsuyoshi Nakao	May 29, 1983 (aged 18)	cm / kg	1	0				
34	DF	Alair	January 27, 1982 (aged 20)	cm / kg	21	0				
35	GK	Kazuki Sawada	June 5, 1982 (aged 19)	cm / kg	0	0				
36	DF	Yohei Suzuki	July 26, 1978 (aged 23)	cm / kg	0	0				
37	FW	Jorginho	September 5, 1979 (aged 22)	cm / kg	16	7				

== Other pages ==
- (in Japanese) J. League official site
