= 1992 Yokohama Marinos season =

Yokohama Marinos
1992 season
- Manager: Hidehiko Shimizu
- Stadium: Yokohama Mitsuzawa Football Stadium (under repair)
- Emperor's Cup: Champions (→Asian Cup Winners' Cup)
- J.League Cup: GL 7th
- Asian Cup Winners' Cup: Champions
- Top goalscorer: League: All: Everton (11)

1992 Yokohama Marinos season

== Team name ==
Club name
Nissan F.C. Yokohama Marinos
Nickname
Yokohama Marinos

== Competitions ==
Competitions	Position
Emperor's Cup	Champions
J.League Cup	GL 7th / 10 clubs
Asian Cup Winners' Cup	Champions

== Domestic results ==
=== Emperor's Cup ===
5 December 1992 1st Round	Yokohama Marinos	8–0	Kanazawa Club	Kyoto Yamashiro Stadium
: JST (UTC+09:00)	K. Kimura ?', ?'; Mizunuma ?', ?', ?'; Jinno ?'; Everton ?'; Koizumi ?'

6 December 1992 2nd Round	Yokohama Marinos	4–2 (a.e.t.)	Yokohama Flügels	Kyoto Yamashiro Stadium
: JST (UTC+09:00)	Everton ?' (pen.) ?' (o.g.); Matsuhashi ?', ?'		Alfred ?'; Chelona ?'

20 December 1992 Quarterfinals	Yokohama Marinos	4–3 (a.e.t.)	Shimizu S-Pulse	Hakatanomori Athletic Stadium
: JST (UTC+09:00)	Everton ?', ?' (pen.); K. Kimura ?'; Omura ?'		Mirandinha ?'; Toninho ?'; Horiike ?'

23 December 1992 Semifinals	Fujita	0–1	Yokohama Marinos	Kobe Universiade Memorial Stadium
: JST (UTC+09:00)			Koizumi ?'

1 January 1993 Final	Verdy Kawasaki	1–2 (a.e.t.)	Yokohama Marinos	Tokyo National Stadium
: JST (UTC+09:00)	Nakamura 83'		Mizunuma 74'; Jinno 102'

=== J.League Cup ===
5 September 1992 GL-1	Gamba Osaka	2–0	Yokohama Marinos	Kobe Central Football Stadium
19:00 JST (UTC+09:00)	Nagashima 69'; Matsuyama 84'	J. League		Attendance: 4,728; Referee: Yōtarō Moritsu; Assistant referees: Kazunori Okada; Yoshikazu Hiroshima; Fourth official: Toshiyuki Osame

9 September 1992 GL-2	Shimizu S-Pulse	2–1	Yokohama Marinos	Nihondaira Sports Stadium
19:00 JST (UTC+09:00)	Ōenoki 72'; Sawanobori 82'	J. League	Yamada 40'	Attendance: 8,032; Referee: Masayoshi Okada; Assistant referees: Kimio Izaki; Yasushi Tsuchimoto; Fourth official: Masami Urayama

12 September 1992 GL-3	Yokohama Marinos	1–0	Nagoya Grampus Eight	Hiratsuka Stadium
18:00 JST (UTC+09:00)	Everton 22'	J. League		Attendance: 7,047; Referee: Hitoshi Yamada; Assistant referees: Hiroshi Fukuda; Masato Nogami; Fourth official: Katsunori Moriya

19 September 1992 GL-4	Yokohama Marinos	3–2	Sanfrecce Hiroshima	Ehime Matsuyama Athletic Stadium
14:30 JST (UTC+09:00)	Jinno 24'; Renato 77'; Everton 86'	J. League	Takagi 28'; Fue 89'	Attendance: 3,262; Referee: Shinichirō Obata; Assistant referees: Mitsuo Kadota; Satoru Kawano; Fourth official: Tatsuya Hyōdō

23 September 1992 GL-5	Yokohama Marinos	4–3 (sudden-death) (a.e.t.)	Kashima Antlers	Tokyo National Stadium
14:00 JST (UTC+09:00)	Everton 32', 54' 105+2'; Jinno 59'	J. League	Ōba 46'; Yoshida 51'; Zico 58'	Attendance: 13,145; Referee: Hitoshi Yamada; Assistant referees: Mitsuru Satō; Yū Nakamura; Fourth official: Haruo Suzuki

27 September 1992 GL-6	Urawa Red Diamonds	2–1	Yokohama Marinos	Kawagoe Stadium
14:00 JST (UTC+09:00)	Fukuda 46'; Hori 63'	J. League	Everton 10'	Attendance: 7,199; Referee: Yū Nakamura; Assistant referees: Hideo Kikuchi; Kiyoshi Ōta; Fourth official: Morihiko Yamaji

3 October 1992 GL-7	Yokohama Marinos	2–1 (sudden-death) (a.e.t.)	Verdy Kawasaki	Tokyo National Stadium
15:35 JST (UTC+09:00)	Omura 71'; Jinno 103'	J. League	Takeda 55'	Attendance: 34,374; Referee: Hideo Kikuchi; Assistant referees: Shizuo Takada; Takeshi Ōkura; Fourth official: Masao Tanaka

7 October 1992 GL-8	JEF United Ichihara	0–1	Yokohama Marinos	Nishigaoka Soccer Stadium
19:01 JST (UTC+09:00)		J. League	Hirakawa 33'	Attendance: 3,551; Referee: Tatsumi Ōno; Assistant referees: Takeshi Ōkura; Kazuaki Hamaguchi; Fourth official: Hiromitsu Hirayama

11 October 1992 GL-9	Yokohama Marinos	1–2 (sudden-death) (a.e.t.)	Yokohama Flügels	Hiratsuka Stadium
14:00 JST (UTC+09:00)	Everton 48'	J. League	Tomishima 10'; Alfred 119'	Attendance: 5,109; Referee: Hideo Kikuchi; Assistant referees: Fumikazu Shioyazono; Hisashi Uemura; Fourth official: Harumi Sasaki

== International results ==
=== Asian Cup Winners' Cup ===
1st Round	bye

18 November 1992 2nd Round-1	(Indonesia) Pupuk Kaltim	1–1	(Japan) Yokohama Marinos	Bontang, Indonesia
	? ?'		? ?'

26 November 1992 2nd Round-2	(Japan) Yokohama Marinos	3–0 (4–1 agg.)	(Indonesia) Pupuk Kaltim	Tokyo, Japan
	Jinno ?', ?'; Everton ?'			Stadium: Tokyo National Stadium

12 December 1992 Semifinals-1	(Vietnam) Quảng Nam Đà Nẵng	1–1	(Japan) Yokohama Marinos	Da Nang, Vietnam
	? ?'		? ?'

26 December 1992 Semifinals-2	(Japan) Yokohama Marinos	3–0 (4–1 agg.)	(Vietnam) Quảng Nam Đà Nẵng	Tokyo, Japan
	Renato 39', 47'; Matsuhashi 86'			Stadium: Tokyo National Stadium

17 January 1993 Final-1	(Japan) Yokohama Marinos	1–1	(Iran) Persepolis	Tokyo, Japan
	Renato ?'		? ?'	Stadium: Tokyo National Stadium

16 April 1993 Final-2	(Iran) Persepolis	0–1 (1–2 agg.)	(Japan) Yokohama Marinos	Tehran, Iran
			Jinno ?'

== Player statistics ==
Pos.	Nat.	Player	D.o.B. (Age)	Height / Weight	Emperor's Cup		J.League Cup		Dom. Total		Asian Cup Winners' Cup	
Pos.	Nat.	Player	D.o.B. (Age)	Height / Weight	Apps	Goals	Apps	Goals	Apps	Goals	Apps	Goals
FW	(Brazil)	Renato	February 21, 1957 (aged 35)	182 cm / 77 kg		0	6	1		1		
MF	(Japan)	Kazushi Kimura	July 19, 1958 (aged 34)	168 cm / 64 kg		2	9	0		2		
MF	(Brazil)	Everton	December 12, 1959 (aged 32)	176 cm / 71 kg		4	9	7		11		
MF	(Japan)	Takashi Mizunuma	May 28, 1960 (aged 32)	171 cm / 61 kg		4	3	0		4		
DF	(Japan)	Toshinobu Katsuya	September 2, 1961 (aged 31)	176 cm / 72 kg		0	6	0		0		
GK	(Japan)	Shigetatsu Matsunaga	August 12, 1962 (aged 30)	180 cm / 74 kg		0	9	0		0		
GK	(Japan)	Izumi Yokokawa	February 25, 1963 (aged 29)	183 cm / 80 kg		0	0	0		0		
DF	(Japan)	Tōru Sano	November 15, 1963 (aged 28)	183 cm / 78 kg		0	0	0		0		
DF	(Japan)	Hiroshi Hirakawa	January 10, 1965 (aged 27)	179 cm / 73 kg		0	9	1		1		
DF	(Japan)	Masami Ihara	September 18, 1967 (aged 24)	182 cm / 72 kg		0	8	0		0		
DF	(Japan)	Junji Koizumi	January 11, 1968 (aged 24)	183 cm / 73 kg		2	9	0		2		
MF	(Japan)	Tatsuya Ai	April 17, 1968 (aged 24)	169 cm / 66 kg		0	0	0		0		
MF	(Japan)	Keiichi Zaizen	June 17, 1968 (aged 24)	173 cm / 60 kg		0	0	0		0		
DF	(Japan)	Yoshinori Hiroma	June 23, 1968 (aged 24)	176 cm / 65 kg		0	0	0		0		
MF	(Japan)	Rikizō Matsuhashi	August 22, 1968 (aged 24)	173 cm / 65 kg		2	6	0		2		
MF	(Brazil)	Mario César	September 11, 1968 (aged 23)	176 cm / 69 kg		0	0	0		0		
DF	(Japan)	Yutaka Matsushita	September 13, 1968 (aged 23)	174 cm / 70 kg		0	0	0		0		
GK	(Japan)	Takeshi Urakami	February 7, 1969 (aged 23)	182 cm / 72 kg		0	0	0		0		
MF	(Japan)	Satoru Noda	March 19, 1969 (aged 23)	174 cm / 68 kg		0	9	0		0		
DF	(Japan)	Norio Omura	September 6, 1969 (aged 22)	180 cm / 75 kg		0	1	1		1		
MF	(Japan)	Naofumi Koike	September 21, 1969 (aged 22)	164 cm / 65 kg		0	0	0		0		
MF	(Japan)	Mikio Miyashita	September 23, 1969 (aged 22)	170 cm / 64 kg		0	0	0		0		
FW	(Japan)	Takuya Jinno	June 1, 1970 (aged 22)	179 cm / 68 kg		2	9	3		5		
FW	(Japan)	Tetsuya Kawakami	June 27, 1970 (aged 22)	171 cm / 67 kg		0	0	0		0		
DF	(Japan)	Masaharu Suzuki	August 3, 1970 (aged 22)	168 cm / 63 kg		0	0	0		0		
DF	(Japan)	Kunio Nagayama	September 16, 1970 (aged 21)	171 cm / 65 kg		0	5	0		0		
FW	(Japan)	Satoru Yoshida	December 18, 1970 (aged 21)	178 cm / 69 kg		0	0	0		0		
FW	(Japan)	Masahiro Katō	April 2, 1971 (aged 21)	173 cm / 65 kg		0	0	0		0		
GK	(Japan)	Isao Ueda	April 11, 1971 (aged 21)	185 cm / 76 kg		0	0	0		0		
DF	(Japan)	Takehito Suzuki	June 11, 1971 (aged 21)	177 cm / 72 kg		0	0	0		0		
FW	(Japan)	Takahiro Yamada	April 29, 1972 (aged 20)	174 cm / 70 kg		0	9	1		1		
DF	(Brazil)	Tsuney Cláudio Okasaki	July 20, 1972 (aged 20)	180 cm / 76 kg		0	0	0		0		
DF	(Japan)	Hiroaki Kimura	May 20, 1973 (aged 19)	176 cm / 64 kg		0	0	0		0		
MF	(Japan)	Junichirō Murashige	June 1, 1973 (aged 19)	173 cm / 66 kg		0	0	0		0		
GK	(Japan)	Daijirō Takakuwa	August 10, 1973 (aged 19)	190 cm / 80 kg		0	0	0		0		
MF	(Japan)	Nobuhisa Isono	January 8, 1974 (aged 18)	174 cm / 72 kg		0	0	0		0		

== Transfers ==
In:

No.	Pos.	Nation	Player
—	GK	JPN	Izumi Yokokawa (from Fujita)
—	DF	JPN	Norio Omura (from Juntendo University)
—	DF	JPN	Takehito Suzuki (from Nissan farm)
—	FW	JPN	Satoru Yoshida (from Nissan farm)
—	GK	JPN	Daijirō Takakuwa (from Nihon University Senior High School)
—	DF	JPN	Yutaka Matsushita (from Nissan farm)
—	DF	JPN	Yoshinori Hiroma (from Nissan farm)
—	DF	JPN	Hiroaki Kimura (from Nissan youth)
—	MF	JPN	Nobuhisa Isono (from Fujioka High School)
—	MF	JPN	Naofumi Koike (from Nissan farm)
—	MF	JPN	Mikio Miyashita (from Nissan farm)
—	MF	JPN	Junichirō Murashige (from Nissan youth)
—	DF	BRA	Tsuney Cláudio Okasaki (from Friburguense Atlético)
—	FW	JPN	Tetsuya Kawakami (from Nissan farm)
—	MF	BRA	Mario César (from AE Apucarana)

Out:

No.	Pos.	Nation	Player
3	DF	JPN	Shinji Tanaka (to Urawa Red Diamonds)
5	DF	JPN	Tetsuji Hashiratani (to Verdy Kawasaki)
6	MF	JPN	Masaaki Sakaida
11	FW	JPN	Kōichi Hashiratani (to Urawa Red Diamonds)
17	DF	JPN	Yoshiaki Okamoto

- Nissan farm is second team of Nissan FC (Yokohama Marinos).

== Transfers during the season ==
=== In ===
none

=== Out ===
none

== Other pages ==
- (in Japanese) J. League official site
- (in Japanese) Yokohama F. Marinos official site
