= Toru Sano =

Japanese footballer and manager

Toru Sano 佐野 達
Personal information
- Full name: Toru Sano
- Date of birth: November 15, 1963 (age 62)
- Place of birth: Shizuoka, Shizuoka, Japan
- Height: 1.83 m (6 ft 0 in)
- Position: Defender

Youth career
- 1979–1981: Shimizu Commercial High School
- 1982–1985: Hosei University

Senior career*
Years	Team	Apps	(Gls)
1986–1992	Yokohama Marinos	79	(1)
Total		79	(1)

International career
1988–1990	Japan	9	(0)

Managerial career
- 2009: Thespa Kusatsu
- 2010–2012: V-Varen Nagasaki
- 2013–2015: Saurcos Fukui
- 2016–2017: Verspah Oita
Medal record
Yokohama Marinos
Winner	Japan Soccer League	1988/89
Winner	Japan Soccer League	1989/90
Runner-up	Japan Soccer League	1990/91
Runner-up	Japan Soccer League	1991/92
Winner	JSL Cup	1988
Winner	JSL Cup	1989
Winner	JSL Cup	1990
Runner-up	JSL Cup	1986
Winner	Emperor's Cup	1988
Winner	Emperor's Cup	1989
Winner	Emperor's Cup	1991
Winner	Emperor's Cup	1992
Runner-up	Emperor's Cup	1990
- * Club domestic league appearances and goals

Toru Sano (佐野 達, Sano Tōru; born November 15, 1963) is a former Japanese football player and manager. He played for Japan national team.

== Club career ==
Sano was born in Shizuoka on November 15, 1963. After graduating from Hosei University, he joined Nissan Motors (later Yokohama Marinos) in 1986. From 1988 to 1990, the club won all three major title in Japan; Japan Soccer League, JSL Cup and Emperor's Cup for 2 years in a row. He could not play in the match much for injury. In 1992, Japan Soccer League was folded and founded new league J1 League. However, he retired in 1992 without playing in J1 League.

== National team career ==
On January 27, 1988, Sano debuted for Japan national team against United Arab Emirates. He played full-time in all matches in 1988. He also played at 1990 Asian Games. He played 9 games for Japan until 1990.

== Coaching career ==
After retirement, Sano coached at Yokohama Marinos (1993–96), Yokohama Flügels (1997–98) and Kyoto Purple Sanga (1999–03). He signed with J2 League club Thespa Kusatsu in 2005 and became a manager in 2009. In 2010, he moved to Japan Football League (JFL) club V-Varen Nagasaki. In 2012 season, however the club won the champions and was promoted to J2 League, he resigned end of the season. In 2013, he signed with Regional Leagues club Saurcos Fukui. He moved to JFL club Verspah Oita in 2016. He resigned in 2017.

== Club statistics ==
Appearances and goals by club, season and competition
Club	Season	League			Emperor's Cup		J.League Cup		Total	
Club	Season	Division	Apps	Goals	Apps	Goals	Apps	Goals	Apps	Goals
Nissan Motors	1986–87	JSL Division 1	22	0					22	0
Nissan Motors	1987–88	JSL Division 1	22	1					22	1
Nissan Motors	1988–89	JSL Division 1	18	0					18	0
Nissan Motors	1989–90	JSL Division 1	15	0			1	0	16	0
Nissan Motors	1990–91	JSL Division 1	2	0			4	0	6	0
Nissan Motors	1991–92	JSL Division 1	0	0			0	0	0	0
Yokohama Marinos	1992	J1 League	—		0	0	0	0	0	0
Career total			79	1	0	0	5	0	84	1

== National team statistics ==
Japan national team
Year	Apps	Goals
1988	5	0
1989	1	0
1990	3	0
Total	9	0

== Managerial statistics ==
Team	From	To	Record				
Team	From	To	G	W	D	L	Win %
Thespa Kusatsu	2009	2009	51	18	11	22	35.29
Total			51	18	11	22	35.29
