= Aoba (surname) =

Aoba (written: 青葉) is a Japanese surname. Notable people with the surname include:

- Ichiko Aoba (青葉 市子) (born 1990), Japanese singer-songwriter
- Kaori Aoba (青葉 かおり) (born 1978), Japanese Go player
- Ringo Aoba (青葉 りんご), Japanese voice actress
- Yukihiro Aoba (青葉 幸洋) (born 1979), Japanese footballer

== Fictional characters ==
- Aoba Kozue (蒼葉 梢), a character in Mahoraba
- Aoba Koyo (青葉 紅葉), a character in Katekyo Hitman Reborn!
- Shigeru Aoba (青葉 シゲル), a character in Neon Genesis Evangelion
- Aoba Suzukaze (涼風 青葉), a character in New Game!
- Yayoi Aoba (青葉 弥生), a character in Captain Tsubasa
- The Aoba was a Salamis-Class Cruiser in the Mobile Suit Gundam universe
- Aoba Tsuzaki (津崎 青葉), a character in Jinki:EXTEND
- Aoba Yamashiro (山城アオバ), a character in the popular manga and anime series Naruto
- Aoba Seragaki (瀬良垣 蒼葉), the protagonist of BL (Boy's Love) game DRAMAtical Murder
- Moca Aoba (青葉 モカ), a character in the multimedia franchise BanG Dream!
- Aoba Tsumugi (青葉 つむぎ), a character in the Japanese game franchise Ensemble Stars!
