= Takehisa Sakamoto =

Japanese footballer

Takehisa Sakamoto 坂本 武久
Personal information
- Full name: Takehisa Sakamoto
- Date of birth: August 26, 1971 (age 55)
- Place of birth: Yamanashi, Japan
- Height: 1.84 m (6 ft 1/2 in)
- Position: Goalkeeper

Youth career
- 1987–1989: Nirasaki High School
- 1990–1993: Meiji University

Senior career*
| Years | Team | Apps | (Gls) |
| 1994–2000 | Ventforet Kofu | 91 | (0) |
| Total | | 91 | (0) |
- * Club domestic league appearances and goals

Takehisa Sakamoto (坂本 武久, Sakamoto Takehisa; born August 26, 1971) is a former Japanese football player.

== Playing career ==
Sakamoto was born in Yamanashi Prefecture on August 26, 1971. After graduating from Meiji University, he joined Japan Football League club Kofu SC (later Ventforet Kofu) based in his local in 1994. He played many matches as goalkeeper and the club was promoted to J2 League from 1999. However he could not play at all in the match behind Tomohiko Ito in 2000 and retired end of 2000 season.

== Career statistics ==
Appearances and goals by club, season and competition
| Club | Season | League | | | Emperor's Cup | | J.League Cup | | Total | |
| Club | Season | Division | Apps | Goals | Apps | Goals | Apps | Goals | Apps | Goals |
|---|---|---|---|---|---|---|---|---|---|---|
| Kofu SC | 1994 | Football League | 10 | 0 | 2 | 0 | — | | 12 | 0 |
| Ventforet Kofu | 1995 | Football League | 6 | 0 | — | | — | | 6 | 0 |
| Ventforet Kofu | 1996 | Football League | 14 | 0 | 2 | 0 | — | | 16 | 0 |
| Ventforet Kofu | 1997 | Football League | 26 | 0 | 3 | 0 | — | | 29 | 0 |
| Ventforet Kofu | 1998 | Football League | 25 | 0 | 0 | 0 | — | | 25 | 0 |
| Ventforet Kofu | 1999 | J2 League | 30 | 0 | 0 | 0 | 2 | 0 | 32 | 0 |
| Ventforet Kofu | 2000 | J2 League | 0 | 0 | 0 | 0 | 0 | 0 | 0 | 0 |
| Career total | | | 91 | 0 | 7 | 0 | 2 | 0 | 100 | 0 |
