= Kim Hwang-jung =

South Korean footballer (born 1975)

Terumasa Kin
Personal information
- Date of birth: November 19, 1975 (age 50)
- Place of birth: Osaka, Japan
- Height: 1.66 m (5 ft 5 1/2 in)
- Position: Striker

Youth career
- 1994–1997: Hannan University

Senior career*
Years	Team	Apps	(Gls)
1998–1999	JEF United Ichihara	9	(1)
2000–2001	Ventforet Kofu	31	(5)
2001	Ulsan Hyundai Horangi	7	(0)
- * Club domestic league appearances and goals

Kim Hwang-Jung (Korean: 김황정), or Terumasa Kin (金 晃正; born 19 November 1975) is a former South Korean football player.

== Club statistics ==
Club performance			League		Cup		League Cup		Total	
Season	Club	League	Apps	Goals	Apps	Goals	Apps	Goals	Apps	Goals
Japan			League		Emperor's Cup		J.League Cup		Total	
1998	JEF United Ichihara	J1 League	9	1	0	0	1	0	10	1
1999	JEF United Ichihara	J1 League	0	0	0	0	1	0	1	0
2000	Ventforet Kofu	J2 League	31	5			2	1	33	6
2001	Ventforet Kofu	J2 League	0	0			1	0	1	0
Total			40	6	0	0	5	1	45	7
