= Takuma Sugano =

Japanese footballer

Takuma Sugano 菅野 拓真
Personal information
- Full name: Takuma Sugano
- Date of birth: April 5, 1980 (age 46)
- Place of birth: Kanagawa, Japan
- Height: 1.88 m (6 ft 2 in)
- Position: Forward

Youth career
- 1996–1998: Narashino High School

Senior career*
Years	Team	Apps	(Gls)
1999–2001	JEF United Ichihara	3	(1)
2000	→ Ventforet Kofu (loan)	20	(3)
2001	Shonan Bellmare	11	(0)
2002–2005	River Plate Asunción		
Total		34	(4)
- * Club domestic league appearances and goals

Takuma Sugano (菅野 拓真, Sugano Takuma; born April 5, 1980) is a former Japanese football player.

== Playing career ==
Sugano was born in Kanagawa Prefecture on April 5, 1980. After graduating from high school, he joined the J1 League club JEF United Ichihara in 1999. On April 12, 2000, he made his debut against Oita Trinita in the 2000 J.League Cup. However, this would be his only appearance for the team. In May 2000, he was loaned to the J2 League club Ventforet Kofu, where he played numerous matches as a forward. In 2001, he returned to JEF United Ichihara, though his playtime was limited. In August 2001, he transferred to Shonan Bellmare and made several appearances as a substitute. The following year, he joined the Paraguayan club River Plate Asunción. On October 12, 2003, he scored in a promotion play-off against 3 de Febrero, though the match ended 4–2 in favor of 3 de Febrero. Sugano retired at the end of the 2005 season.

== Club statistics ==
Club performance			League		Cup		League Cup		Total	
Season	Club	League	Apps	Goals	Apps	Goals	Apps	Goals	Apps	Goals
Japan			League		Emperor's Cup		J.League Cup		Total	
1999	JEF United Ichihara	J1 League	0	0	0	0	0	0	0	0
2000	JEF United Ichihara	J1 League	0	0	0	0	1	0	1	0
2000	Ventforet Kofu	J2 League	20	3	2	1	0	0	22	4
2001	JEF United Ichihara	J1 League	3	1	0	0	0	0	3	1
2001	Shonan Bellmare	J2 League	11	0			0	0	11	0
Total			34	4	2	1	1	0	37	5
