= Makoto Kaneko (footballer) =

Japanese footballer

Makoto Kaneko 金子 誠
Personal information
- Full name: Makoto Kaneko
- Date of birth: December 9, 1975 (age 50)
- Place of birth: Kanagawa, Japan
- Height: 1.74 m (5 ft 8 1/2 in)
- Position: Midfielder

Youth career
- 1991–1993: Toin Gakuen High School
- 1994–1997: Komazawa University

Senior career*
Years	Team	Apps	(Gls)
1998–2002	Ventforet Kofu		
- * Club domestic league appearances and goals

Makoto Kaneko (金子 誠, Kaneko Makoto; born December 9, 1975) is a former Japanese football player.

== Playing career ==
Kaneko was born in Kanagawa Prefecture on December 9, 1975. After graduating from Komazawa University, he joined the Japan Football League club Ventforet Kofu in 1998. The club was promoted to the new J2 League in 1999. Although he played many matches as a regular midfielder until 2001, the club finished in last place three years in a row (1999-2001). In 2002, he did not play at all and retired at the end of the 2002 season.

== Career statistics ==
Appearances and goals by club, season and competition
Club	Season	League			Emperor's Cup		J.League Cup		Total	
Club	Season	Division	Apps	Goals	Apps	Goals	Apps	Goals	Apps	Goals
Ventforet Kofu	1998	Football League								
Ventforet Kofu	1999	J2 League	31	3			2	0	33	3
Ventforet Kofu	2000	J2 League	34	2			0	0	34	2
Ventforet Kofu	2001	J2 League	38	3			2	0	40	2
Ventforet Kofu	2002	J2 League	0	0			—		0	0
Career total			103	8	0	0	4	0	107	8
