= Daisuke Ishihara =

Japanese footballer

Daisuke Ishihara 石原 大助
Personal information
- Full name: Daisuke Ishihara
- Date of birth: December 9, 1971 (age 54)
- Place of birth: Yamanashi, Japan
- Height: 1.70 m (5 ft 7 in)
- Position: Defender

Youth career
- 1987–1989: Kofu Higashi High School
- 1990–1993: Nippon Sport Science University

Senior career*
| Years | Team | Apps | (Gls) |
| 1994–2001 | Ventforet Kofu | 213 | (6) |
| Total | | 213 | (6) |
- * Club domestic league appearances and goals

Daisuke Ishihara (石原 大助, Ishihara Daisuke; born December 9, 1971) is a former Japanese football player.

== Playing career ==
Ishihara was born in Yamanashi Prefecture on December 9, 1971. After graduating from Nippon Sport Science University, he joined the Japan Football League club Kofu SC (later Ventforet Kofu), based in his local area, in 1994. He became a regular player as a center back during the first season and the club was promoted to the new J2 League in 1999. Although he played often, the club finished in last place for three years in a row (1999-2001). His did not play as much in 2001 and he retired at the end of the 2001 season.

== Career statistics ==
Appearances and goals by club, season and competition
| Club | Season | League | | | Emperor's Cup | | J.League Cup | | Total | |
| Club | Season | Division | Apps | Goals | Apps | Goals | Apps | Goals | Apps | Goals |
|---|---|---|---|---|---|---|---|---|---|---|
| Kofu SC | 1994 | Football League | 27 | 2 | 2 | 0 | — | | 29 | 2 |
| Ventforet Kofu | 1995 | Football League | 29 | 0 | — | | — | | 29 | 0 |
| Ventforet Kofu | 1996 | Football League | 23 | 0 | 0 | 0 | — | | 23 | 0 |
| Ventforet Kofu | 1997 | Football League | 24 | 0 | 3 | 0 | — | | 27 | 0 |
| Ventforet Kofu | 1998 | Football League | 28 | 0 | 3 | 0 | — | | 31 | 0 |
| Ventforet Kofu | 1999 | J2 League | 36 | 0 | 1 | 0 | 2 | 0 | 39 | 0 |
| Ventforet Kofu | 2000 | J2 League | 29 | 4 | 3 | 0 | 0 | 0 | 32 | 4 |
| Ventforet Kofu | 2001 | J2 League | 17 | 0 | 3 | 0 | 0 | 0 | 20 | 0 |
| Career total | | | 213 | 6 | 15 | 0 | 2 | 0 | 230 | 6 |
