= Tatsuya Ai =

Japanese footballer (born 1968)

Tatsuya Ai 阿井 達也
Personal information
- Full name: Tatsuya Ai
- Date of birth: April 17, 1968 (age 58)
- Place of birth: Saitama, Japan
- Height: 1.69 m (5 ft 6 1/2 in)
- Position: Midfielder

Youth career
- 1984–1986: Iruma Koyo High School
- 1987–1990: Rissho University

Senior career*
Years	Team	Apps	(Gls)
1991–1993	Yokohama Marinos		
1994–1995	Otsuka Pharmaceutical	32	(0)
1996	Denso	28	(1)
1997–2000	Ventforet Kofu	129	(13)
Total		189	(14)
Medal record
Yokohama Marinos
Runner-up	Japan Soccer League	1991/92
Winner	Emperor's Cup	1991
Winner	Emperor's Cup	1992
- * Club domestic league appearances and goals

Tatsuya Ai (阿井 達也, Ai Tatsuya; born April 17, 1968) is a former Japanese football player.

== Playing career ==
Ai was born in Saitama Prefecture on April 17, 1968. After graduating from Rissho University, he joined Nissan Motors (later Yokohama Marinos) in 1991. However he could hardly play in the match and he moved to Japan Football League (JFL) club Otsuka Pharmaceutical in 1994. Although he became a regular player as midfielder in 1994, he lost his opportunity to play in 1995. He moved to JFL club Denso in 1996 and Ventforet Kofu in 1997 and he played as regular player at both clubs. At Ventforet in 1999, the club was promoted to new league J2 League. He retired end of 2000 season.

== Career statistics ==
Appearances and goals by club, season and competition
Club	Season	League			Emperor's Cup		J.League Cup		Total	
Club	Season	Division	Apps	Goals	Apps	Goals	Apps	Goals	Apps	Goals
Yokohama Marinos	1992	J1 League	—		0	0	0	0	0	0
Yokohama Marinos	1993	J1 League	1	0	0	0	1	0	2	0
Otsuka Pharmaceutical	1994	Football League	30	0	2	0	—		32	0
Otsuka Pharmaceutical	1995	Football League	2	0	0	0	—		2	0
Denso	1996	Football League	28	1	3	0	—		31	1
Ventforet Kofu	1997	Football League	29	8	3	1	—		32	9
Ventforet Kofu	1998	Football League	29	4	3	0	—		32	4
Ventforet Kofu	1999	J2 League	35	0	2	0	2	0	39	0
Ventforet Kofu	2000	J2 League	36	1	3	1	2	0	41	2
Career total			190	14	16	2	5	0	211	16
