= Tomohiko Ito (footballer) =

Japanese footballer

Tomohiko Ito 伊藤 友彦
Personal information
- Full name: Tomohiko Ito
- Date of birth: May 28, 1978 (age 48)
- Place of birth: Osaka, Japan
- Height: 1.87 m (6 ft 1 1/2 in)
- Position: Goalkeeper

Youth career
- 1994–1996: Chukyo University Chukyo High School

Senior career*
Years	Team	Apps	(Gls)
1997–1998	Nagoya SC		
1999–2000	Ventforet Kofu	44	(0)
2001–2002	Shonan Bellmare	1	(0)
2003–2005	Cerezo Osaka	23	(0)
2006–2010	Shonan Bellmare	30	(0)
Total		98	(0)
Medal record
Cerezo Osaka
Runner-up	Emperor's Cup	2003
- * Club domestic league appearances and goals

Tomohiko Ito (伊藤 友彦, Itō Tomohiko; born May 28, 1978) is a former Japanese football player.

== Playing career ==
Ito was born in Osaka Prefecture on May 28, 1978. After graduating from high school, he joined Regional Leagues club Nagoya SC in 1997. In 1999, he moved to newly was promoted to J2 League club, Ventforet Kofu. Although he could not play at all in the match behind Takehisa Sakamoto, he became a regular goalkeeper from late 1999. However the club finished at bottom place for 2 years in a row (1999-2000). In 2001, he moved to J2 club Shonan Bellmare. However he could hardly play in the match behind Yuji Ito and Masahito Suzuki. In 2003, he moved to J1 club Cerezo Osaka. However he could not play at all in the match behind Seigo Shimokawa and Daisuke Tada in 2003. In 2004, he played many matches as regular goalkeeper. However he could hardly play in the match behind new member Motohiro Yoshida in 2005. In 2006, he moved to J2 club Shonan Bellmare for the first time in 4 years. Although he played many matches as regular goalkeeper in 2006, he could not play at all in the match behind newcomer Kim Yeong-gi from 2007 and retired end of 2009 season. However he came back as player in 2010 because many goalkeeper got hurt. However he did not play the match and retired end of 2010 season.

== Career statistics ==
Appearances and goals by club, season and competition
Club	Season	League			Emperor's Cup		J.League Cup		Total	
Club	Season	Division	Apps	Goals	Apps	Goals	Apps	Goals	Apps	Goals
Ventforet Kofu	1999	J2 League	6	0	2	0	0	0	8	0
Ventforet Kofu	2000	J2 League	38	0	4	0	2	0	44	0
Shonan Bellmare	2001	J2 League	1	0	0	0	0	0	1	0
Shonan Bellmare	2002	J2 League	0	0	0	0	—		0	0
Cerezo Osaka	2003	J1 League	0	0	0	0	0	0	0	0
Cerezo Osaka	2004	J1 League	23	0	1	0	4	0	28	0
Cerezo Osaka	2005	J1 League	0	0	1	0	0	0	1	0
Shonan Bellmare	2006	J2 League	30	0	0	0	—		30	0
Shonan Bellmare	2007	J2 League	0	0	0	0	—		0	0
Shonan Bellmare	2008	J2 League	0	0	0	0	—		0	0
Shonan Bellmare	2009	J2 League	0	0	0	0	—		0	0
Shonan Bellmare	2010	J1 League	0	0	0	0	0	0	0	0
Career total			98	0	8	0	6	0	112	0
