= Freitas (footballer, born 1978) =

Brazilian footballer

Personal information
- Full name: Ricardo de Freitas Carreira
- Date of birth: January 20, 1978 (age 48)
- Place of birth: Brazil
- Height: 1.80 m (5 ft 11 in)
- Position: Defender

Senior career*
Years	Team	Apps	(Gls)
2001	Ventforet Kofu	20	(0)
- * Club domestic league appearances and goals

Ricardo de Freitas Carreira (born January 20, 1978) is a former Brazilian football player.

== Playing career ==
In 2001, Freitas joined Japanese J2 League club Ventforet Kofu, He debuted in the league against Shonan Bellmare on March 17. Ventforet finished bottom of the league for the third year in a row and he left the team at the end of the 2001 season.

== Club statistics ==
Club performance			League		Cup		League Cup		Total	
Season	Club	League	Apps	Goals	Apps	Goals	Apps	Goals	Apps	Goals
Japan			League		Emperor's Cup		J.League Cup		Total	
2001	Ventforet Kofu	J2 League	20	0			2	0	22	0
Total			20	0	0	0	2	0	22	0
