= Tetsumasa Kimura =

Japanese footballer and manager

Tetsumasa Kimura 木村 哲昌
Personal information
- Full name: Tetsumasa Kimura
- Date of birth: January 24, 1972 (age 54)
- Place of birth: Yamato, Kanagawa, Japan
- Height: 1.70 m (5 ft 7 in)
- Position: Defender

Youth career
- 1987–1989: Kojo High School
- 1990–1993: Komazawa University

Senior career*
Years	Team	Apps	(Gls)
1994–1995	Kyoto Purple Sanga		
1996	Blaze Kumamoto		
1996	Denso		
1997	Blaze Kumamoto		
1997–1999	Ventforet Kofu	36	(0)
2000	JEF United Ichihara	0	(0)
2001–2002	Gunma FC Horikoshi		
2003	East Auckland		
2003	University-Mount Wellington		
2004	Onehunga Sports		

Managerial career
- 2012–2014: SC Sagamihara
- 2015: Vonds Ichihara
- * Club domestic league appearances and goals

Tetsumasa Kimura (木村 哲昌, Kimura Tetsumasa; born January 24, 1972) is a former Japanese football player and manager.

== Playing career ==
Kimura was born in Yamato on January 24, 1972. After graduating from Komazawa University, he joined the Japan Football League (JFL) club Kyoto Purple Sanga in 1994. In 1996, he played for the Regional Leagues club Blaze Kumamoto, JFL club Denso, and Ventforet Kofu. At Ventforet Kofu, the club was promoted to the new J2 League. He played as a regular right side back. In 2000, he moved to the J1 League club JEF United Ichihara. However he did not play in any matches. In 2001, he moved to the Prefectural Leagues club Gunma FC Horikoshi. In 2003, he moved to New Zealand and played for East Auckland, University-Mount Wellington, and Onehunga Sports. He retired at the end of the 2004 season.

== Coaching career ==
In 2012, Kimura became a manager for the Regional Leagues club SC Sagamihara in 2012. The club was promoted to the Japan Football League in 2013 and the J3 League in 2014. In 2015, he moved to the Regional Leagues club Vonds Ichihara and became a coach. In May 2014, he became a manager and managed the club until the end of the 2014 season.

== Club statistics ==
Club performance			League		Cup		League Cup		Total	
Season	Club	League	Apps	Goals	Apps	Goals	Apps	Goals	Apps	Goals
Japan			League		Emperor's Cup		J.League Cup		Total	
1994	Kyoto Purple Sanga	Football League								
1995	Kyoto Purple Sanga	Football League					-			
1996	Blaze Kumamoto	Regional Leagues								
1996	Denso	Football League								
1997	Blaze Kumamoto	Regional Leagues								
1997	Ventforet Kofu	Football League								
1998	Ventforet Kofu	Football League								
1999	Ventforet Kofu	J2 League	36	0			2	0	38	0
2000	JEF United Ichihara	J1 League	0	0			0	0	0	0
Total			36	0	0	0	0	0	36	0

== Managerial statistics ==
Team	From	To	Record				
Team	From	To	G	W	D	L	Win %
SC Sagamihara	2014	2014	33	12	7	14	36.36
Total			33	12	7	14	36.36
