= Hiroyuki Dobashi =

Japanese footballer

Hiroyuki Dobashi 土橋 宏由樹
Personal information
- Full name: Hiroyuki Dobashi
- Date of birth: November 27, 1977 (age 48)
- Place of birth: Kofu, Yamanashi, Japan
- Height: 1.80 m (5 ft 11 in)
- Position: Midfielder

Youth career
- 1993–1995: Nirasaki Technical High School

Senior career*
| Years | Team | Apps | (Gls) |
| 1998–2005 | Ventforet Kofu | | |
| 2006–2007 | Matsumoto Yamaga FC | 27 | (9) |
| 2008–2011 | AC Nagano Parceiro | 82 | (18) |
- * Club domestic league appearances and goals

Hiroyuki Dobashi (土橋 宏由樹, Dobashi Hiroyuki; born November 27, 1977) is a former Japanese football player.

== Playing career ==
Dobashi was born in Kofu on November 27, 1977. After graduating from high school, he joined Japan Football League club Ventforet Kofu based in his local in 1998. The club was promoted to new league J2 League from 1999. Although he played many matches as defensive midfielder, the club finished at bottom place for 3 years in a row (1999-2001). From 2002, he played many matches except for the season when he got hurt and the club results got better. In 2005, although the club won the 3rd place and was promoted to J1 League from 2006, he could not play at all in the match in 2005. In 2006, he moved to Regional Leagues club Matsumoto Yamaga FC. He became a regular player and played many matches in 2 seasons. In 2008, he moved to Regional Leagues club AC Nagano Parceiro. He played as regular player and the club was promoted to Japan Football League from 2011. Although he played as regular player, his opportunity to play decreased since he injured his right knee in summer and retired end of 2011 season.

== Career statistics ==
Appearances and goals by club, season and competition
| Club | Season | League | | | Emperor's Cup | | J.League Cup | | Total | |
| Club | Season | Division | Apps | Goals | Apps | Goals | Apps | Goals | Apps | Goals |
|---|---|---|---|---|---|---|---|---|---|---|
| Ventforet Kofu | 1998 | Football League | | | | | | | | |
| Ventforet Kofu | 1999 | J2 League | 26 | 3 | 2 | 0 | 0 | 0 | 28 | 3 |
| Ventforet Kofu | 2000 | J2 League | 30 | 3 | 4 | 0 | 2 | 0 | 36 | 3 |
| Ventforet Kofu | 2001 | J2 League | 13 | 0 | 0 | 0 | 1 | 0 | 14 | 0 |
| Ventforet Kofu | 2002 | J2 League | 26 | 1 | 1 | 0 | - | | 27 | 1 |
| Ventforet Kofu | 2003 | J2 League | 11 | 0 | 2 | 0 | - | | 13 | 0 |
| Ventforet Kofu | 2004 | J2 League | 32 | 1 | 0 | 0 | - | | 32 | 1 |
| Ventforet Kofu | 2005 | J2 League | 0 | 0 | 0 | 0 | - | | 0 | 0 |
| Matsumoto Yamaga FC | 2006 | Regional Leagues | 14 | 3 | 1 | 0 | - | | 15 | 3 |
| Matsumoto Yamaga FC | 2007 | Regional Leagues | 13 | 6 | - | | - | | 13 | 6 |
| AC Nagano Parceiro | 2008 | Regional Leagues | 13 | 0 | - | | - | | 13 | 0 |
| AC Nagano Parceiro | 2009 | Regional Leagues | 12 | 4 | - | | - | | 12 | 4 |
| AC Nagano Parceiro | 2010 | Regional Leagues | 12 | 4 | - | | - | | 12 | 4 |
| AC Nagano Parceiro | 2011 | Football League | 18 | 1 | - | | - | | 18 | 1 |
| Career total | | | 220 | 26 | 10 | 0 | 3 | 0 | 233 | 26 |
