= Shinichi Fujita =

Japanese footballer

Shinichi Fujita 藤田 慎一
Personal information
- Full name: Shinichi Fujita
- Date of birth: April 10, 1973 (age 53)
- Place of birth: Osaka, Japan
- Height: 1.77 m (5 ft 9 1/2 in)
- Position: Defender

Youth career
- 1989–1991: Hokuyo High School
- 1992–1995: Kindai University

Senior career*
Years	Team	Apps	(Gls)
1996–1997	Kawasaki Frontale		
1998–1999	Albirex Niigata		
2000	Ventforet Kofu	27	(2)
- * Club domestic league appearances and goals

Shinichi Fujita (藤田 慎一, Fujita Shinichi; born April 10, 1973) is a former Japanese soccer player and youth soccer coach. He was a defender.

Fujita was born in Osaka Prefecture on April 10, 1973. After graduating from Kindai University, he joined Japan Football League (JFL) club Kawasaki Frontale in 1996. In 1998, he moved to JFL club Albirex Niigata. The club was promoted to new league J2 League from 1999. In 2000, he moved to J2 club Ventforet Kofu. He played many matches and retired at the end of the 2000 season.

== Club statistics ==
Club performance			League		Cup		League Cup		Total	
Season	Club	League	Apps	Goals	Apps	Goals	Apps	Goals	Apps	Goals
Japan			League		Emperor's Cup		J.League Cup		Total	
1999	Albirex Niigata	J2 League	12	0			2	0	14	0
2000	Ventforet Kofu	J2 League	27	2			2	0	29	2
Total			39	2	0	0	4	0	43	2
