= Kenji Nakada =

Japanese footballer

Kenji Nakada 仲田 建二
Personal information
- Full name: Kenji Nakada
- Date of birth: October 4, 1973 (age 53)
- Place of birth: Yamanashi, Japan
- Height: 1.80 m (5 ft 11 in)
- Position: Defender

Youth career
- 1989–1991: Narasaki High School
- 1992–1995: Aoyama Gakuin University

Senior career*
Years	Team	Apps	(Gls)
1996–2005	Ventforet Kofu	228	(8)
Total		228	(8)

Managerial career
- 2020: FC Gifu
- 2022: YSCC Yokohama
- * Club domestic league appearances and goals

Kenji Nakada (仲田 建二, Nakada Kenji; born October 4, 1973) is a Japanese football manager and former player.

== Playing career ==
Nakada was born in Yamanashi Prefecture on October 4, 1973. After graduating from Aoyama Gakuin University, he joined Japan Football League club Ventforet Kofu based in his local in 1996. He became a regular player as center back from first season and the club was promoted to new league J2 League from 1999. Although he played many matches for a long time, the club finished at bottom place for 3 years in a row (1999-2001). His opportunity to play decreased from 2002. Although he could not play at all in the match in 2005, the club won 3rd place and was promoted to J1 League from 2006. However he retired at the end of the 2005 season without playing J1.

== Career statistics ==
Appearances and goals by club, season and competition
Club	Season	League			Emperor's Cup		J.League Cup		Total	
Club	Season	Division	Apps	Goals	Apps	Goals	Apps	Goals	Apps	Goals
Ventforet Kofu	1996	Football League	24	1	2	1	—		26	2
Ventforet Kofu	1997	Football League	28	0	3	0	—		31	0
Ventforet Kofu	1998	Football League	30	2	4	0	—		34	2
Ventforet Kofu	1999	J2 League	28	3	2	0	2	0	32	3
Ventforet Kofu	2000	J2 League	37	1	4	1	2	0	43	2
Ventforet Kofu	2001	J2 League	34	0	3	0	1	0	38	0
Ventforet Kofu	2002	J2 League	23	1	0	0	—		23	1
Ventforet Kofu	2003	J2 League	20	0	3	0	—		23	0
Ventforet Kofu	2004	J2 League	4	0	0	0	—		4	0
Ventforet Kofu	2005	J2 League	0	0	0	0	—		0	0
Career total			228	8	21	2	5	0	254	10
