= Kazuki Kuranuki =

Japanese footballer

Kazuki Kuranuki 倉貫 一毅
Personal information
- Full name: Kazuki Kuranuki
- Date of birth: November 10, 1978 (age 48)
- Place of birth: Otsu, Shiga, Japan
- Height: 1.72 m (5 ft 7 1/2 in)
- Position: Midfielder

Youth career
- 1994–1996: Shizuoka Gakuen High School

Senior career*
Years	Team	Apps	(Gls)
1997–1999	Júbilo Iwata	0	(0)
2000–2006	Ventforet Kofu	246	(12)
2007–2008	Kyoto Sanga FC	35	(5)
2008–2011	Tokushima Vortis	137	(9)
2012–2013	Kyoto Sanga FC	27	(0)
2014	Gainare Tottori	32	(0)
Total		477	(26)

Managerial career
- 2023: FC Ryukyu
- 2023-2024: YSCC Yokohama
Medal record
Júbilo Iwata
Winner	J1 League	1997
Winner	J1 League	1999
Runner-up	J1 League	1998
Winner	J.League Cup	1998
Runner-up	J.League Cup	1997
- * Club domestic league appearances and goals

Kazuki Kuranuki (倉貫 一毅, Kuranuki Kazuki; born November 10, 1978) is a Japanese football manager and former football player.

== Playing career ==
Kuranuki was born in Otsu on November 10, 1978. After graduating from Shizuoka Gakuen High School, he joined J1 League club Júbilo Iwata in 1997. However, he did not play in any official games for the club in which many Japan national team players played. In 2000, he moved to a J2 League club, Ventforet Kofu. He became a regular player as offensive midfielder from first season. The club finished in last place for two consecutive seasons (2000-2001). After that, the club finished around the middle of the J2 League from 2002 to 2004. In 2005, the club improved and finished in 3rd place, earning a promotion to the J1 League for the 2006 season.

Kuranuki was injured in April 2006 with an anterior cruciate ligament injury in the left knee, and he could not play until December. In 2007, Kuranuki moved to J2 club Kyoto Sanga FC. He played as a regular player in 2007, and the club was promoted to J1 from 2008. However, the club gained many players and Kuranuki did not play regularly.

In June 2008, Kuranuki moved to J2 club Tokushima Vortis. He played as regular player until the 2011 season. In 2012, Kuranuki moved to Kyoto Sanga FC again and played in two seasons. In 2014, Kuranuki moved to J3 League club Gainare Tottori. He played as regular player and retired at the end of the 2014 season.

== Managerial career ==
On 28 October 2022, Kuranuki appointed manager of relegated J3 club, FC Ryukyu from 2023 season.

== Career statistics ==
Appearances and goals by club, season and competition
Club	Season	League			Emperor's Cup		J.League Cup		Total	
Club	Season	Division	Apps	Goals	Apps	Goals	Apps	Goals	Apps	Goals
Júbilo Iwata	1997	J1 League	0	0	0	0	0	0	0	0
Júbilo Iwata	1998	J1 League	0	0	0	0	0	0	0	0
Júbilo Iwata	1999	J1 League	0	0	0	0	0	0	0	0
Ventforet Kofu	2000	J2 League	39	3	4	0	2	0	45	3
Ventforet Kofu	2001	J2 League	25	0	1	0	1	0	27	0
Ventforet Kofu	2002	J2 League	44	1	3	0	—		47	1
Ventforet Kofu	2003	J2 League	44	0	3	0	—		47	0
Ventforet Kofu	2004	J2 League	41	1	1	0	—		42	1
Ventforet Kofu	2005	J2 League	43	4	2	0	—		45	4
Ventforet Kofu	2006	J1 League	10	3	2	1	3	0	15	4
Kyoto Sanga FC	2007	J2 League	35	5	0	0	—		35	5
Kyoto Sanga FC	2008	J1 League	0	0	0	0	0	0	0	0
Tokushima Vortis	2008	J2 League	21	3	1	0	—		22	3
Tokushima Vortis	2009	J2 League	49	3	1	1	—		50	4
Tokushima Vortis	2010	J2 League	33	2	2	0	—		35	2
Tokushima Vortis	2011	J2 League	34	1	1	0	—		35	1
Kyoto Sanga FC	2012	J2 League	13	0	0	0	—		13	0
Kyoto Sanga FC	2013	J2 League	14	0	2	0	—		16	0
Gainare Tottori	2014	J3 League	32	0	2	0	—		34	0
Career total			477	26	25	2	6	0	508	28

== Managerial statistics ==
As of 28 October 2022.

Managerial record by club and tenure
Team	From	To	Record							
Team	From	To	G	W	D	L	GF	GA	GD	Win %
FC Ryukyu	28 October 2022	present	0	0	0	0	0	0	+0	—
Total			0	0	0	0	0	0	+0	—
