= Alex (footballer, born 1975) =

Brazilian footballer

Personal information
- Full name: Alex Felipe Nery
- Date of birth: August 14, 1975 (age 51)
- Place of birth: Brazil
- Height: 1.70 m (5 ft 7 in)
- Position: Midfielder

Senior career*
Years	Team	Apps	(Gls)
2001	Ventforet Kofu	26	(3)
- * Club domestic league appearances and goals

Alex Felipe Nery (born August 14, 1975) is a former Brazilian football player.

== Playing career ==
In summer 2001, Alex joined Japanese J2 League club Ventforet Kofu which finished at the bottom place for 2 years in a row (1999-2000). He debuted in J2 against Montedio Yamagata on July 7. He played many matches as regular midfielder after the debut. However Ventforet finished at the bottom place for 3 years in a row and he left Ventforet end of 2001 season.

== Club statistics ==
Club performance			League		Cup		League Cup		Total	
Season	Club	League	Apps	Goals	Apps	Goals	Apps	Goals	Apps	Goals
Japan			League		Emperor's Cup		J.League Cup		Total	
2001	Ventforet Kofu	J2 League	26	3			0	0	26	3
Total			26	3	0	0	0	0	26	3
