= 1999 Ventforet Kofu season =

Ventforet Kofu
1999 season
- Manager: Susumu Katsumata
- Stadium: Kose Sports Park Stadium
- J.League 2: 10th
- Emperor's Cup: 2nd Round
- J.League Cup: 1st Round
- Top goalscorer: Katsutomo Oshiba (7); Gakuya Horii (7)
Home colours	Away colours

1999 Ventforet Kofu season

== Competitions ==
Competitions	Position
J.League 2	10th / 10 clubs
Emperor's Cup	2nd round
J.League Cup	1st round

== Domestic results ==
=== J.League 2 ===
14 March 1999 1	Ventforet Kofu	1-2	Omiya Ardija	Nirasaki Central Park Stadium
JST (UTC+09)

21 March 1999 2	Sagan Tosu	4-0	Ventforet Kofu	Tosu Stadium
JST (UTC+09)

28 March 1999 3	Ventforet Kofu	1-2	Vegalta Sendai	Nirasaki Central Park Stadium
JST (UTC+09)

4 April 1999 4	Albirex Niigata	6-1	Ventforet Kofu	Niigata City Athletic Stadium
JST (UTC+09)

10 April 1999 5	Ventforet Kofu	1-2	Kawasaki Frontale	Kose Sports Park Stadium
JST (UTC+09)

18 April 1999 6	Montedio Yamagata	4-1	Ventforet Kofu	Yamagata Park Stadium
JST (UTC+09)

23 April 1999 7	Ventforet Kofu	0-3	FC Tokyo	Kose Sports Park Stadium
JST (UTC+09)

29 April 1999 8	Oita Trinita	1-1 (GG) (a.e.t.)	Ventforet Kofu	Saiki Stadium
JST (UTC+09)

2 May 1999 9	Consadole Sapporo	6-0	Ventforet Kofu	Sapporo Atsubetsu Park Stadium
JST (UTC+09)

5 May 1999 10	Ventforet Kofu	0-3	Sagan Tosu	Kose Sports Park Stadium
JST (UTC+09)

9 May 1999 11	Vegalta Sendai	1-2 (GG) (a.e.t.)	Ventforet Kofu	Sendai Stadium
JST (UTC+09)

16 May 1999 12	Ventforet Kofu	3-0	Albirex Niigata	Kose Sports Park Stadium
JST (UTC+09)

23 May 1999 13	Kawasaki Frontale	3-1	Ventforet Kofu	Todoroki Athletics Stadium
JST (UTC+09)

29 May 1999 14	Ventforet Kofu	2-1	Montedio Yamagata	Kose Sports Park Stadium
JST (UTC+09)

27 June 1999 15	FC Tokyo	1-0	Ventforet Kofu	Edogawa Stadium
JST (UTC+09)

4 July 1999 16	Ventforet Kofu	1-2	Oita Trinita	Kose Sports Park Stadium
JST (UTC+09)

9 July 1999 17	Ventforet Kofu	1-1 (GG) (a.e.t.)	Consadole Sapporo	Kose Sports Park Stadium
JST (UTC+09)

17 July 1999 18	Omiya Ardija	1-1 (GG) (a.e.t.)	Ventforet Kofu	Konosu Stadium
JST (UTC+09)

1 August 1999 19	Ventforet Kofu	5-0	Sagan Tosu	Kose Sports Park Stadium
JST (UTC+09)

8 August 1999 20	Omiya Ardija	2-0	Ventforet Kofu	Omiya Football Stadium
JST (UTC+09)

15 August 1999 21	Ventforet Kofu	1-2	Vegalta Sendai	Kose Sports Park Stadium
JST (UTC+09)

19 August 1999 22	Albirex Niigata	1-1 (GG) (a.e.t.)	Ventforet Kofu	Niigata City Athletic Stadium
JST (UTC+09)

31 August 1999 23	Ventforet Kofu	0-4	Oita Trinita	Kose Sports Park Stadium
JST (UTC+09)

5 September 1999 24	Montedio Yamagata	3-0	Ventforet Kofu	Yamagata Park Stadium
JST (UTC+09)

10 September 1999 25	Ventforet Kofu	3-5	FC Tokyo	Nirasaki Central Park Stadium
JST (UTC+09)

15 September 1999 26	Consadole Sapporo	4-0	Ventforet Kofu	Sapporo Atsubetsu Park Stadium
JST (UTC+09)

19 September 1999 27	Ventforet Kofu	1-2	Kawasaki Frontale	Nirasaki Central Park Stadium
JST (UTC+09)

26 September 1999 28	Ventforet Kofu	0-1	Omiya Ardija	Kose Sports Park Stadium
JST (UTC+09)

3 October 1999 29	Vegalta Sendai	1-0 (GG) (a.e.t.)	Ventforet Kofu	Sendai Stadium
JST (UTC+09)

11 October 1999 30	Ventforet Kofu	0-2	Albirex Niigata	Kose Sports Park Stadium
JST (UTC+09)

16 October 1999 31	Oita Trinita	2-1 (GG) (a.e.t.)	Ventforet Kofu	Oita Athletic Stadium
JST (UTC+09)

25 October 1999 32	Ventforet Kofu	3-0	Montedio Yamagata	Kose Sports Park Stadium
JST (UTC+09)

30 October 1999 33	FC Tokyo	2-0	Ventforet Kofu	Komazawa Olympic Park Stadium
JST (UTC+09)

6 November 1999 34	Ventforet Kofu	0-3	Consadole Sapporo	Kose Sports Park Stadium
JST (UTC+09)

14 November 1999 35	Kawasaki Frontale	3-0	Ventforet Kofu	Todoroki Athletics Stadium
JST (UTC+09)

21 November 1999 36	Sagan Tosu	5-0	Ventforet Kofu	Tosu Stadium
JST (UTC+09)

=== Emperor's Cup ===
28 November 1999 1st Round	Maebashi Commercial High School	1-2	Ventforet Kofu	Gunma Shikishima Soccer Stadium
JST (UTC+09)

5 December 1999 2nd Round	Ventforet Kofu	0-0 (GG) (a.e.t.) (3-4 p)	Sony Sendai	Kose Sports Park Stadium
JST (UTC+09)

=== J.League Cup ===
7 April 1999 1st Round-1	Ventforet Kofu	0-2	Verdy Kawasaki	Kose Sports Park Stadium
JST (UTC+09)

14 April 1999 1st Round-2	Verdy Kawasaki	1-1 (3-1 agg.)	Ventforet Kofu	Todoroki Athletics Stadium
JST (UTC+09)

== Player statistics ==
No.	Pos.	Nat.	Player	D.o.B. (Age)	Height / Weight	J.League 2		Emperor's Cup		J.League Cup		Total	
No.	Pos.	Nat.	Player	D.o.B. (Age)	Height / Weight	Apps	Goals	Apps	Goals	Apps	Goals	Apps	Goals
1	GK	(Japan)	Takehisa Sakamoto	August 26, 1971 (aged 27)	cm / kg	30	0						
2	DF	(Japan)	Tetsumasa Kimura	January 24, 1972 (aged 27)	cm / kg	36	0						
3	DF	(Japan)	Susumu Watanabe	October 10, 1973 (aged 25)	cm / kg	35	2						
4	MF	(Japan)	Makoto Kaneko	December 9, 1975 (aged 23)	cm / kg	31	3						
5	DF	(Japan)	Daisuke Ishihara	December 9, 1971 (aged 27)	cm / kg	36	0						
6	DF	(Japan)	Kenji Nakada	October 4, 1973 (aged 25)	cm / kg	28	3						
7	MF	(Japan)	Kazuto Saiki	August 20, 1970 (aged 28)	cm / kg	31	0						
8	MF	(Japan)	Tatsuya Ai	April 17, 1968 (aged 30)	cm / kg	35	0						
9	FW	(Japan)	Satoru Yoshida	December 18, 1970 (aged 28)	cm / kg	24	4						
10	FW	(Japan)	Katsutomo Oshiba	May 10, 1973 (aged 25)	cm / kg	36	7						
11	MF	(Japan)	Masahiro Shimmyo	July 16, 1972 (aged 26)	cm / kg	26	2						
12	MF	(Japan)	Hiroyuki Dobashi	November 27, 1977 (aged 21)	cm / kg	26	3						
13	MF	(Japan)	Yoshinobu Akao	October 3, 1975 (aged 23)	cm / kg	16	1						
14	FW	(Japan)	Gakuya Horii	July 3, 1975 (aged 23)	cm / kg	34	7						
15	DF	(Japan)	Yuki Imamura	July 11, 1976 (aged 22)	cm / kg	1	0						
16	MF	(Japan)	Takeshi Shimizu	August 18, 1975 (aged 23)	cm / kg	7	0						
17	MF	(Japan)	Keiji Koizumi	July 28, 1976 (aged 22)	cm / kg	1	0						
18	MF	(Japan)	Yoshio Kitajima	October 29, 1975 (aged 23)	cm / kg	6	0						
19	MF	(Japan)	Atsuto Oishi	October 24, 1976 (aged 22)	cm / kg	5	0						
20	DF	(Japan)	Yusaku Tanioku	October 18, 1978 (aged 20)	cm / kg	13	0						
21	GK	(Japan)	Yuki Muramatsu	August 27, 1977 (aged 21)	cm / kg	0	0						
22	GK	(Japan)	Tomohiko Ito	May 28, 1978 (aged 20)	cm / kg	6	0						
23	DF	(Japan)	Shinya Hagihara	April 7, 1971 (aged 27)	cm / kg	4	0						
24	MF	(Japan)	Yohei Takayama	November 26, 1979 (aged 19)	cm / kg	1	0						
25	DF	(Japan)	Yasuhiro Yamamura	August 18, 1976 (aged 22)	cm / kg	0	0						
26	MF	(Japan)	Isao Dobashi	April 11, 1975 (aged 23)	cm / kg	0	0						
27	MF	(Japan)	Eiichi Uemura	December 1, 1975 (aged 23)	cm / kg	1	0						
28	DF	(Japan)	Michiharu Otagiri	September 2, 1978 (aged 20)	cm / kg	9	0						

== Other pages ==
- (in Japanese) J. League official site
