= Hitoshi Matsushima =

Japanese footballer

Hitoshi Matsushima 松島 仁
Personal information
- Full name: Hitoshi Matsushima
- Date of birth: April 30, 1980 (age 46)
- Place of birth: Obihiro, Hokkaido, Japan
- Height: 1.82 m (5 ft 11 1/2 in)
- Position: Forward

Youth career
- 1996–1998: Tokai University Daiichi High School

Senior career*
Years	Team	Apps	(Gls)
1999–2000	Shimizu S-Pulse	4	(0)
2001–2002	Ventforet Kofu	51	(4)
Total		55	(4)
Medal record
Shimizu S-Pulse
Runner-up	J1 League	1999
Runner-up	Emperor's Cup	2000
- * Club domestic league appearances and goals

Hitoshi Matsushima (松島 仁, Matsushima Hitoshi; born April 30, 1980) is a former Japanese football player.

== Playing career ==
Matsushima was born in Obihiro on April 30, 1980. After graduating from high school, he joined J1 League club Shimizu S-Pulse in 1999. Although he played several matches from first season, he could hardly play in the match. In 2001, he moved to J2 League club Ventforet Kofu. He played many matches as substitute forward in 2 seasons and retired end of 2002 season.

== Career statistics ==
Appearances and goals by club, season and competition
Club	Season	League			Emperor's Cup		J.League Cup		Total	
Club	Season	Division	Apps	Goals	Apps	Goals	Apps	Goals	Apps	Goals
Shimizu S-Pulse	1999	J1 League	0	0	0	0	2	0	2	0
Shimizu S-Pulse	2000	J1 League	4	0	2	0	0	0	6	0
Ventforet Kofu	2001	J2 League	27	3	0	0	2	0	29	3
Ventforet Kofu	2002	J2 League	24	1	2	0	—		26	1
Career total			55	4	4	0	4	0	63	4
