= Sandro Zamboni =

Brazilian footballer

Personal information
- Full name: Sandro Luís Zamboni Britzke
- Date of birth: February 20, 1978 (age 48)
- Place of birth: Brazil
- Height: 1.88 m (6 ft 2 in)
- Position: Forward

Senior career*
Years	Team	Apps	(Gls)
1997	Santa Helena		
1998–1999	Camboriú		
2000	Ventforet Kofu	13	(3)
2002–2003	TSV Schwieberdingen		
2003–2004	Al Ahli SC		
2004–2006	Deportivo Marquense		
2006–2008	Suchitepéquez		
2008–2009	Alianza		
2009–2010	Deportivo Mictlán		
2010–2013	Deportivo Petapa		
2013	Deportivo Ayutla		
2014	Aurora		
2014–2015	Deportivo Petapa		
2015	Cobán Imperial		
2015–2016	Cotzumalguapa	10	(2)
- * Club domestic league appearances and goals

Sandro Luís Zamboni Britzke (born February 20, 1978) is a Brazilian former professional footballer who played as a forward.

== Career ==
In 2000, Zamboni joined the Japanese J2 League club Ventforet Kofu, which finished at the bottom place in 1999 season. However, he could not play many matches and Ventforet finished at the bottom place for two years in a row.

Playing several years in Guatemala, Zamboni scored 16 goals in 2011–12 and 17 goals in 2012–13 for Deportivo Petapa.

== Career statistics ==
Club performance			League		Cup		League Cup		Total	
Season	Club	League	Apps	Goals	Apps	Goals	Apps	Goals	Apps	Goals
Japan			League		Emperor's Cup		J.League Cup		Total	
2000	Ventforet Kofu	J2 League	13	3			1	0	14	3
Total			13	3	0	0	1	0	14	3
