= 2001 Ventforet Kofu season =

Ventforet Kofu
2001 season
- Manager: Reis
- Stadium: Kose Sports Park Stadium
- J.League 2: 12th
- Emperor's Cup: 3rd Round
- J.League Cup: 1st Round
- Top goalscorer: Keisuke Ota (11)
Home colours	Away colours

2001 Ventforet Kofu season

== Competitions ==
Competitions	Position
J.League 2	12th / 12 clubs
Emperor's Cup	3rd Round
J.League Cup	1st Round

== Domestic results ==
=== J.League 2 ===
10 March 2001 1	Kawasaki Frontale	3-1	Ventforet Kofu	Todoroki Athletics Stadium
JST (UTC+09)

17 March 2001 2	Ventforet Kofu	0-3	Shonan Bellmare	Kose Sports Park Stadium
JST (UTC+09)

25 March 2001 3	Vegalta Sendai	3-0	Ventforet Kofu	Sendai Stadium
JST (UTC+09)

31 March 2001 4	Ventforet Kofu	1-3	Oita Trinita	Kose Sports Park Stadium
JST (UTC+09)

7 April 2001 5	Omiya Ardija	3-1	Ventforet Kofu	Omiya Football Stadium
JST (UTC+09)

14 April 2001 6	Ventforet Kofu	3-1	Mito HollyHock	Kose Sports Park Stadium
JST (UTC+09)

21 April 2001 7	Yokohama FC	2-1	Ventforet Kofu	Yokohama Mitsuzawa Stadium
JST (UTC+09)

28 April 2001 8	Montedio Yamagata	1-0	Ventforet Kofu	Yamagata Park Stadium
JST (UTC+09)

3 May 2001 9	Ventforet Kofu	2-0	Sagan Tosu	Kose Sports Park Stadium
JST (UTC+09)

6 May 2001 10	Kyoto Purple Sanga	4-0	Ventforet Kofu	Nishikyogoku Athletic Stadium
JST (UTC+09)

12 May 2001 11	Ventforet Kofu	0-2	Albirex Niigata	Kose Sports Park Stadium
JST (UTC+09)

19 May 2001 12	Shonan Bellmare	4-1	Ventforet Kofu	Hiratsuka Athletics Stadium
JST (UTC+09)

23 May 2001 13	Ventforet Kofu	1-2 (GG) (a.e.t.)	Vegalta Sendai	Kose Sports Park Stadium
JST (UTC+09)

26 May 2001 14	Mito HollyHock	2-1	Ventforet Kofu	Hitachinaka City Stadium
JST (UTC+09)

16 June 2001 15	Ventforet Kofu	2-0	Yokohama FC	Kose Sports Park Stadium
JST (UTC+09)

23 June 2001 16	Ventforet Kofu	1-3	Kyoto Purple Sanga	Kose Sports Park Stadium
JST (UTC+09)

28 June 2001 17	Albirex Niigata	4-0	Ventforet Kofu	Niigata City Athletic Stadium
JST (UTC+09)

7 July 2001 18	Ventforet Kofu	0-1	Montedio Yamagata	Kose Sports Park Stadium
JST (UTC+09)

11 July 2001 19	Sagan Tosu	4-0	Ventforet Kofu	Tosu Stadium
JST (UTC+09)

14 July 2001 20	Ventforet Kofu	1-1 (GG) (a.e.t.)	Kawasaki Frontale	Kose Sports Park Stadium
JST (UTC+09)

21 July 2001 21	Oita Trinita	5-0	Ventforet Kofu	Oita Athletic Stadium
JST (UTC+09)

25 July 2001 22	Ventforet Kofu	0-2	Omiya Ardija	Kose Sports Park Stadium
JST (UTC+09)

28 July 2001 23	Ventforet Kofu	0-1	Albirex Niigata	Kose Sports Park Stadium
JST (UTC+09)

3 August 2001 24	Vegalta Sendai	4-1	Ventforet Kofu	Sendai Stadium
JST (UTC+09)

11 August 2001 25	Montedio Yamagata	2-1	Ventforet Kofu	Yamagata Park Stadium
JST (UTC+09)

14 August 2001 26	Ventforet Kofu	1-5	Sagan Tosu	Kose Sports Park Stadium
JST (UTC+09)

18 August 2001 27	Ventforet Kofu	2-3 (GG) (a.e.t.)	Mito HollyHock	Kose Sports Park Stadium
JST (UTC+09)

26 August 2001 28	Yokohama FC	1-2 (GG) (a.e.t.)	Ventforet Kofu	Yokohama Mitsuzawa Stadium
JST (UTC+09)

1 September 2001 29	Ventforet Kofu	2-3	Oita Trinita	Kose Sports Park Stadium
JST (UTC+09)

5 September 2001 30	Omiya Ardija	1-2	Ventforet Kofu	Omiya Football Stadium
JST (UTC+09)

8 September 2001 31	Kyoto Purple Sanga	2-0	Ventforet Kofu	Nishikyogoku Athletic Stadium
JST (UTC+09)

15 September 2001 32	Ventforet Kofu	1-1 (GG) (a.e.t.)	Shonan Bellmare	Kose Sports Park Stadium
JST (UTC+09)

19 September 2001 33	Kawasaki Frontale	1-2	Ventforet Kofu	Todoroki Athletics Stadium
JST (UTC+09)

22 September 2001 34	Ventforet Kofu	0-2	Montedio Yamagata	Kose Sports Park Stadium
JST (UTC+09)

28 September 2001 35	Ventforet Kofu	1-3	Yokohama FC	Kose Sports Park Stadium
JST (UTC+09)

6 October 2001 36	Mito HollyHock	2-0	Ventforet Kofu	Kasamatsu Stadium
JST (UTC+09)

13 October 2001 37	Sagan Tosu	2-0	Ventforet Kofu	Okinawa Athletic Stadium
JST (UTC+09)

17 October 2001 38	Ventforet Kofu	0-2	Kyoto Purple Sanga	Kose Sports Park Stadium
JST (UTC+09)

20 October 2001 39	Albirex Niigata	4-1	Ventforet Kofu	Niigata Stadium
JST (UTC+09)

29 October 2001 40	Ventforet Kofu	3-0	Kawasaki Frontale	Kose Sports Park Stadium
JST (UTC+09)

3 November 2001 41	Shonan Bellmare	2-0	Ventforet Kofu	Hiratsuka Athletics Stadium
JST (UTC+09)

6 November 2001 42	Ventforet Kofu	3-0	Vegalta Sendai	Kose Sports Park Stadium
JST (UTC+09)

10 November 2001 43	Oita Trinita	3-0	Ventforet Kofu	Ōita Stadium
JST (UTC+09)

18 November 2001 44	Ventforet Kofu	0-1 (GG) (a.e.t.)	Omiya Ardija	Kose Sports Park Stadium
JST (UTC+09)

=== Emperor's Cup ===
25 November 2001 1st Round	Osaka University of Health and Sport Sciences	0-4	Ventforet Kofu	Takatsuki Hagitani Soccer Stadium
JST (UTC+09)

2 December 2001 2nd Round	Ventforet Kofu	1-0	ALO's Hokuriku	Kose Sports Park Stadium
JST (UTC+09)

9 December 2001 3rd Round	Urawa Red Diamonds	2-0	Ventforet Kofu	Omiya Football Stadium
JST (UTC+09)

=== J.League Cup ===
4 April 2001 1st Round-1	FC Tokyo	5-0	Ventforet Kofu	Tokyo Stadium
JST (UTC+09)

18 April 2001 1st Round-2	Ventforet Kofu	0-1 (0-6 agg.)	FC Tokyo	Kose Sports Park Stadium
JST (UTC+09)

== Player statistics ==
No.	Pos.	Nat.	Player	D.o.B. (Age)	Height / Weight	J.League 2		Emperor's Cup		J.League Cup		Total	
No.	Pos.	Nat.	Player	D.o.B. (Age)	Height / Weight	Apps	Goals	Apps	Goals	Apps	Goals	Apps	Goals
1	GK	(Japan)	Hiromasa Azuma	August 29, 1977 (aged 23)	cm / kg	25	0						
2	DF	(Japan)	Yusaku Tanioku	October 18, 1978 (aged 22)	cm / kg	38	1						
3	DF	(Japan)	Takashi Sambonsuge	June 5, 1978 (aged 22)	cm / kg	18	0						
4	MF	(Japan)	Makoto Kaneko	December 9, 1975 (aged 25)	cm / kg	38	3						
5	DF	(Japan)	Daisuke Ishihara	December 9, 1971 (aged 29)	cm / kg	17	0						
6	DF	(Japan)	Hideaki Matsuura	June 25, 1981 (aged 19)	cm / kg	13	0						
7	MF	(Japan)	Hiroyuki Dobashi	November 27, 1977 (aged 23)	cm / kg	13	0						
8	MF	(Japan)	Teppei Uchida	May 22, 1975 (aged 25)	cm / kg	1	0						
9	MF	(Japan)	Ken Fujita	August 27, 1979 (aged 21)	cm / kg	35	4						
10	MF	(Japan)	Kazuki Kuranuki	November 10, 1978 (aged 22)	cm / kg	25	0						
11	FW		Terumasa Kin	November 19, 1975 (aged 25)	cm / kg	0	0						
11	MF	(Brazil)	Alex	August 14, 1975 (aged 25)	cm / kg	26	3						
12	DF	(Japan)	Masahiro Kano	April 4, 1977 (aged 23)	cm / kg	37	1						
13	MF	(Japan)	Atsushi Mio	January 26, 1983 (aged 18)	cm / kg	33	2						
14	FW	(Japan)	Shinya Hoshido	October 4, 1978 (aged 22)	cm / kg	18	1						
15	MF	(Japan)	Keisuke Ota	July 23, 1981 (aged 19)	cm / kg	43	11						
16	FW	(Japan)	Hitoshi Matsushima	April 30, 1980 (aged 20)	cm / kg	27	3						
17	DF	(Brazil)	Freitas	January 20, 1978 (aged 23)	cm / kg	20	0						
18	DF	(Japan)	Kenji Nakada	October 4, 1973 (aged 27)	cm / kg	34	0						
19	MF	(Brazil)	Vagner	January 9, 1978 (aged 23)	cm / kg	3	0						
19	DF	(Japan)	Tsuyoshi Tanikawa	April 25, 1980 (aged 20)	cm / kg	20	0						
20	FW	(Brazil)	Deili	March 8, 1980 (aged 21)	cm / kg	13	1						
20	MF	(Japan)	Jun Mizukoshi	January 15, 1975 (aged 26)	cm / kg	9	0						
21	GK	(Japan)	Yusuke Kawakita	May 13, 1978 (aged 22)	cm / kg	13	0						
22	GK	(Japan)	Wataru Ota	March 14, 1981 (aged 19)	cm / kg	6	0						
23	DF	(Japan)	Yutaka Ito	April 23, 1978 (aged 22)	cm / kg	0	0						
24	FW	(Japan)	Satoru Yoshida	December 18, 1970 (aged 30)	cm / kg	30	3						
25	FW	(Japan)	Yoshitaka Kageyama	March 31, 1978 (aged 22)	cm / kg	0	0						
26	DF	(Japan)	Keijiro Ozawa	May 23, 1978 (aged 22)	cm / kg	0	0						
27	MF	(Japan)	Katsuya Ishihara	October 2, 1978 (aged 22)	cm / kg	30	2						
28	MF	(Japan)	Reiji Nakajima	June 28, 1979 (aged 21)	cm / kg	0	0						
29	FW	(Japan)	Masatoshi Matsuda	September 4, 1980 (aged 20)	cm / kg	12	2						

== Other pages ==
- (in Japanese) J. League official site
