= Yoshitaka Kageyama =

Japanese footballer

Yoshitaka Kageyama 影山 由高
Personal information
- Full name: Yoshitaka Kageyama
- Date of birth: March 31, 1978 (age 48)
- Place of birth: Tokyo, Japan
- Height: 1.73 m (5 ft 8 in)
- Position: Forward

Youth career
- Azabu University Fuchinobe High School

Senior career*
Years	Team	Apps	(Gls)
- Toho Titanium
2001–2003	Ventforet Kofu	44	(8)
2004	Sagawa Printing	23	(3)
Total		67	(11)
- * Club domestic league appearances and goals

Yoshitaka Kageyama (影山 由高, Kageyama Yoshitaka; born March 31, 1978) is a former Japanese football player.

== Playing career ==
Kageyama was born in Tokyo on March 31, 1978. After graduating from high school, he played for Toho Titanium. In August 2001, he moved to J2 League club Ventforet Kofu. Although he could hardly play in the match in 2001, he became a regular forward under new manager Takeshi Oki in 2002. He scored 8 goals and became a top scorer in the club. However manager Oki resigned end of 2002 season and Kageyama could hardly play in the match under new manager Hideki Matsunaga in 2003 season. In 2004, he moved to Japan Football League club Sagawa Printing. He retired end of 2004 season.

== Career statistics ==
Appearances and goals by club, season and competition
Club	Season	League			Emperor's Cup		J.League Cup		Total	
Club	Season	Division	Apps	Goals	Apps	Goals	Apps	Goals	Apps	Goals
Ventforet Kofu	2001	J2 League	0	0	1	0	0	0	1	0
Ventforet Kofu	2002	J2 League	38	8	0	0	—		38	8
Ventforet Kofu	2003	J2 League	6	0	0	0	—		6	0
Sagawa Printing	2004	Football League	23	3	2	0	—		25	3
Career total			67	11	3	0	0	0	70	11
