= Izumi Yokokawa =

Japanese footballer

Izumi Yokokawa 横川 泉
Personal information
- Full name: Izumi Yokokawa
- Date of birth: February 25, 1963 (age 63)
- Place of birth: Yamanashi, Japan
- Height: 1.83 m (6 ft 0 in)
- Position: Goalkeeper

Youth career
- 1978–1980: Nirasaki High School
- 1981–1984: Meiji University

Senior career*
Years	Team	Apps	(Gls)
1985–1992	Fujita Industries	112	(0)
1992–1994	Yokohama Marinos	0	(0)
Total		112	(0)
Medal record
Fujita Industries
Runner-up	Emperor's Cup	1985
Runner-up	Emperor's Cup	1988
Yokohama Marinos
Winner	Emperor's Cup	1992
- * Club domestic league appearances and goals

Izumi Yokokawa (横川 泉, Yokokawa Izumi; born February 25, 1963) is a former Japanese football player.

== Playing career ==
Yokokawa was born in Yamanashi Prefecture on February 25, 1963. After graduating from Meiji University, he joined Fujita Industries in 1985. He became a regular goalkeeper from first season. The club won the 2nd place 1985 and 1988 Emperor's Cup. However he lost his opportunity to play behind Kiyoto Furushima from 1991. In 1992, he moved to Yokohama Marinos. However he could hardly play in the match behind Shigetatsu Matsunaga and retired end of 1994 season.

== Club statistics ==
Club performance			League		Cup		League Cup		Total	
Season	Club	League	Apps	Goals	Apps	Goals	Apps	Goals	Apps	Goals
Japan			League		Emperor's Cup		J.League Cup		Total	
1985/86	Fujita Industries	JSL Division 1	21	0					21	0
1986/87	Fujita Industries	JSL Division 1	21	0					21	0
1987/88	Fujita Industries	JSL Division 1	21	0					21	0
1988/89	Fujita Industries	JSL Division 1	17	0			2	0	19	0
1989/90	Fujita Industries	JSL Division 1	4	0			4	0	8	0
1990/91	Fujita Industries	JSL Division 2	28	0			0	0	28	0
1991/92	Fujita Industries	JSL Division 2	0	0			0	0	0	0
1992	Yokohama Marinos	J1 League	-		0	0	0	0	0	0
1993	Yokohama Marinos	J1 League	0	0	0	0	3	0	3	0
1994	Yokohama Marinos	J1 League	0	0	0	0	0	0	0	0
Total			112	0	0	0	9	0	121	0
