= Yukihiro Aoba =

Japanese footballer

Yukihiro Aoba 青葉 幸洋
Personal information
- Full name: Yukihiro Aoba
- Date of birth: July 26, 1979 (age 47)
- Place of birth: Higashimatsuyama, Saitama, Japan
- Height: 1.74 m (5 ft 8 1/2 in)
- Position: Defender

Youth career
- 1995–1997: Higashi Matsuyama Minami High School
- 1998–2001: Juntendo University

Senior career*
Years	Team	Apps	(Gls)
2002–2005	Ventforet Kofu	140	(0)
2006	Tokyo Verdy	14	(2)
2007	Tokushima Vortis	44	(1)
Total		198	(3)
- * Club domestic league appearances and goals

Yukihiro Aoba (青葉 幸洋, Aoba Yukihiro; born July 26, 1979) is a former Japanese football player.

== Playing career ==
Aoba was born in Higashimatsuyama on July 26, 1979. After graduating from Juntendo University, he joined J2 League club Ventforet Kofu in 2002. He became a regular player as left side back from first season. Although his original position is side back, he also played many matches as center back. Ventforet won the 3rd place in 2005 season and was promoted to J1 League. However he left the club end of 2005 season without playing J1. In 2006, he moved to J2 club Tokyo Verdy. However he could not play many matches. In 2007, he moved to Tokushima Vortis. He played many matches as regular player. He retired at the end of the 2007 season.

== Career statistics ==
Appearances and goals by club, season and competition
Club	Season	League			Emperor's Cup		Asia		Total	
Club	Season	Division	Apps	Goals	Apps	Goals	Apps	Goals	Apps	Goals
Ventforet Kofu	2002	J2 League	43	0	3	0	-		46	0
Ventforet Kofu	2003	J2 League	38	0	3	0	-		41	0
Ventforet Kofu	2004	J2 League	34	0	2	0	-		36	0
Ventforet Kofu	2005	J2 League	25	0	2	0	-		27	0
Tokyo Verdy	2006	J2 League	14	2	0	0	1	0	15	2
Tokushima Vortis	2007	J2 League	44	1	2	0	-		46	1
Career total			198	3	12	0	1	0	211	0
