= Masahiro Shimmyo =

Japanese footballer

Masahiro Shimmyo 新明 正広
Personal information
- Full name: Masahiro Shimmyo
- Date of birth: July 16, 1972 (age 54)
- Place of birth: Chiba, Japan
- Height: 1.77 m (5 ft 9 1/2 in)
- Position: Midfielder

Youth career
- 1988–1990: Narashino High School

Senior career*
Years	Team	Apps	(Gls)
1991–1996	Consadole Sapporo	69	(9)
1997–2000	Ventforet Kofu	110	(14)
Total		179	(23)
- * Club domestic league appearances and goals

Masahiro Shimmyo (新明 正広, Shimmyo Masahiro; born July 16, 1972) is a former Japanese football player.

== Playing career ==
Shimmyo was born in Chiba Prefecture on July 16, 1972. After graduating from high school, he joined Japan Soccer League club Toshiba (later Consadole Sapporo) in 1991. In 1992, Japan Soccer League was folded and the club joined new league Japan Football League (JFL). He played many matches as offensive midfielder from 1992. However his opportunity to play decreased in 1996. In 1997, he moved to JFL club Ventforet Kofu. He played many matches and the club was promoted to new league J2 League from 1999. Although he played many matches, the club finished at bottom place for 2 years in a row (1999-2000). He retired end of 2000 season.

== Club statistics ==
Club performance			League		Cup		League Cup		Total	
Season	Club	League	Apps	Goals	Apps	Goals	Apps	Goals	Apps	Goals
Japan			League		Emperor's Cup		J.League Cup		Total	
1991/92	Toshiba	JSL Division 1	0	0					0	0
1992	Toshiba	Football League	9	0			-		9	0
1993	Toshiba	Football League	13	3	2	0	-		15	3
1994	Toshiba	Football League	19	2	0	0	-		19	2
1995	Toshiba	Football League	20	4	0	0	-		20	4
1996	Consadole Sapporo	Football League	8	0	0	0	-		8	0
1997	Ventforet Kofu	Football League	25	0	2	0	-		27	0
1998	Ventforet Kofu	Football League	26	10	4	1	-		30	11
1999	Ventforet Kofu	J2 League	26	2	1	0	2	0	29	2
2000	Ventforet Kofu	J2 League	33	2	4	0	2	0	39	2
Total			179	23	13	1	4	0	196	24
