= Masahiro Momitani =

Japanese footballer

Masahiro Momitani 籾谷 真弘
Personal information
- Full name: Masahiro Momitani
- Date of birth: June 2, 1981 (age 45)
- Place of birth: Osaka, Japan
- Height: 1.80 m (5 ft 11 in)
- Position: Defender

Youth career
- 1997–1999: Cerezo Osaka

Senior career*
| Years | Team | Apps | (Gls) |
| 2000–2001 | Cerezo Osaka | 0 | (0) |
| 2002–2006 | Thespa Kusatsu | 84 | (4) |
| 2007–2012 | AC Nagano Parceiro | 66 | (6) |
| Total | | 150 | (10) |
Medal record
Cerezo Osaka
| Runner-up | Emperor's Cup | 2001 |
- * Club domestic league appearances and goals

Masahiro Momitani (籾谷 真弘, Momitani Masahiro; born June 2, 1981) is a former Japanese football player.

== Playing career ==
Momitani was born in Osaka Prefecture on June 2, 1981. He joined J1 League club Cerezo Osaka from youth team in 2000. However he could not play at all in the match until 2001. In 2002, he moved to Prefectural Leagues club Thespa Kusatsu. He played many matches as center back and the club was promoted to Regional Leagues from 2003, Japan Football League (JFL) from 2004 and J2 League from 2005. Although he played many matches until 2005, he could not play many matches in 2006. In 2007, he moved to Regional Leagues club AC Nagano Parceiro. He played as regular player and the club was promoted to JFL from 2011. However his opportunity to play decreased from 2011 and he retired end of 2012 season.

== Career statistics ==
Appearances and goals by club, season and competition
| Club | Season | League | | | Emperor's Cup | | J.League Cup | | Total | |
| Club | Season | Division | Apps | Goals | Apps | Goals | Apps | Goals | Apps | Goals |
|---|---|---|---|---|---|---|---|---|---|---|
| Cerezo Osaka | 2000 | J1 League | 0 | 0 | 0 | 0 | 0 | 0 | 0 | 0 |
| Cerezo Osaka | 2001 | J1 League | 0 | 0 | 0 | 0 | 0 | 0 | 0 | 0 |
| Thespa Kusatsu | 2002 | Prefectural Leagues | 13 | 3 | | | — | | 13 | 3 |
| Thespa Kusatsu | 2003 | Regional Leagues | 13 | 0 | | | — | | 13 | 0 |
| Thespa Kusatsu | 2004 | Football League | 15 | 0 | 4 | 0 | — | | 19 | 0 |
| Thespa Kusatsu | 2005 | J2 League | 36 | 1 | 1 | 0 | — | | 37 | 1 |
| Thespa Kusatsu | 2006 | J2 League | 7 | 0 | 0 | 0 | — | | 7 | 0 |
| AC Nagano Parceiro | 2007 | Regional Leagues | 13 | 0 | — | | — | | 13 | 0 |
| AC Nagano Parceiro | 2008 | Regional Leagues | 13 | 4 | — | | — | | 13 | 4 |
| AC Nagano Parceiro | 2009 | Regional Leagues | 12 | 1 | — | | — | | 12 | 1 |
| AC Nagano Parceiro | 2010 | Regional Leagues | 14 | 1 | — | | — | | 14 | 1 |
| AC Nagano Parceiro | 2011 | Football League | 12 | 0 | — | | — | | 12 | 0 |
| AC Nagano Parceiro | 2012 | Football League | 2 | 0 | 0 | 0 | — | | 2 | 0 |
| Career total | | | 150 | 10 | 5 | 0 | 0 | 0 | 155 | 10 |
