= Masahiro Kano =

Japanese footballer

Masahiro Kano 加納 昌弘
Personal information
- Full name: Masahiro Kano
- Date of birth: April 4, 1977 (age 49)
- Place of birth: Chiba, Japan
- Height: 1.74 m (5 ft 8 1/2 in)
- Position: Defender

Youth career
- 1993–1995: Senshu University Matsudo High School
- 1996–1999: Senshu University

Senior career*
Years	Team	Apps	(Gls)
2000–2002	Ventforet Kofu	67	(1)
Total		67	(1)
- * Club domestic league appearances and goals

Masahiro Kano (加納 昌弘, Kano Masahiro; born April 4, 1977) is a former Japanese football player.

== Playing career ==
Kano was born in Chiba Prefecture on April 4, 1977. After graduating from Senshu University, he joined the J2 League club Ventforet Kofu in 2000. He played many matches as substitute in 2000 and became a regular player as defensive midfielder in 2001. In 2002, he became a regular player as a right side back, but he rarely played during that summer and retired at the end of the 2002 season.

== Career statistics ==
Appearances and goals by club, season and competition
Club	Season	League			Emperor's Cup		J.League Cup		Total	
Club	Season	Division	Apps	Goals	Apps	Goals	Apps	Goals	Apps	Goals
Ventforet Kofu	2000	J2 League	18	0			2	0	20	0
Ventforet Kofu	2001	J2 League	37	1			1	0	38	1
Ventforet Kofu	2002	J2 League	12	0			—		12	0
Career total			67	1	0	0	3	0	70	1
