= Keiichi Zaizen =

Japanese footballer and manager

Keiichi Zaizen 財前 恵一
Personal information
- Full name: Keiichi Zaizen
- Date of birth: June 17, 1968 (age 58)
- Place of birth: Muroran, Hokkaido, Japan
- Height: 1.73 m (5 ft 8 in)
- Position: Midfielder

Youth career
- 1984–1986: Muroran Otani High School

Senior career*
Years	Team	Apps	(Gls)
1987–1995	Yokohama Marinos	12	(0)
1994	→Kashiwa Reysol (loan)	3	(0)
1996	Consadole Sapporo	4	(0)
Total		19	(0)

Managerial career
- 2013–2014: Consadole Sapporo
Medal record
Yokohama Marinos
Winner	Japan Soccer League	1988/89
Winner	Japan Soccer League	1989/90
Runner-up	Japan Soccer League	1990/91
Runner-up	Japan Soccer League	1991/92
Winner	J1 League	1995
Winner	JSL Cup	1988
Winner	JSL Cup	1989
Winner	JSL Cup	1990
Winner	Emperor's Cup	1988
Winner	Emperor's Cup	1989
Winner	Emperor's Cup	1991
Winner	Emperor's Cup	1992
Runner-up	Emperor's Cup	1990
- * Club domestic league appearances and goals

Keiichi Zaizen (財前 恵一, Zaizen Keiichi; born June 17, 1968) is a Japanese former football player and manager. His younger brother Nobuyuki is also a former footballer.

== Playing career ==
Zaizen was born in Muroran on June 17, 1968. After graduating from high school, he joined Nissan Motors in 1987. However he could hardly play in the match. He also played for Japan Football League club Kashiwa Reysol (1994) and Consadole Sapporo (1996). He retired end of 1996 season.

== Coaching career ==
After retirement, Zaizen started coaching career at Consadole Sapporo in 1997. He mainly coached for youth team until 2009. In 2010, he moved to Avispa Fukuoka and mainly managed youth team until 2012. In 2013, he returned to Consadole and he became a manager for top team. However he was sacked in August 2014.

== Club statistics ==
Club performance			League		Cup		League Cup		Total	
Season	Club	League	Apps	Goals	Apps	Goals	Apps	Goals	Apps	Goals
Japan			League		Emperor's Cup		J.League Cup		Total	
1987/88	Nissan Motors	JSL Division 1	1	0					1	0
1988/89	Nissan Motors	JSL Division 1	0	0					0	0
1989/90	Nissan Motors	JSL Division 1	3	0			0	0	3	0
1990/91	Nissan Motors	JSL Division 1	4	0			0	0	4	0
1991/92	Nissan Motors	JSL Division 1	3	0			3	0	6	0
1992	Yokohama Marinos	J1 League	-		0	0	0	0	0	0
1993	Yokohama Marinos	J1 League	1	0	0	0	0	0	1	0
1994	Kashiwa Reysol	Football League	3	0	0	0	-		3	0
1995	Yokohama Marinos	J1 League	0	0	0	0	-		0	0
1996	Consadole Sapporo	Football League	4	0	0	0	-		4	0
Total			19	0	0	0	3	0	22	0

== Managerial statistics ==
Team	From	To	Record				
Team	From	To	G	W	D	L	Win %
Consadole Sapporo	2013	2014	70	29	12	29	41.43
Total			70	29	12	29	41.43
