= Masahiro Hayama =

Japanese ice hockey player

- Born: 23 January 1910 Pyongyang, Korean Empire
- Position: Defence
- National team: Japan

Masahiro Hayama (早間 雅博, Hayama Masahiro; born 23 January 1910, date of death unknown) was a Japanese ice hockey player. He competed in the men's tournament at the 1936 Winter Olympics.
