= Hidehito Shirao =

Japanese footballer

Hidehito Shirao 白尾 秀人
Personal information
- Full name: Hidehito Shirao
- Date of birth: September 30, 1980 (age 46)
- Place of birth: Yoron, Kagoshima, Japan
- Height: 1.75 m (5 ft 9 in)
- Position: Forward

Youth career
- 1996–1997: Yoron High School
- 1998: Kunimi High School
- 1999–2002: Kokushikan University

Senior career*
Years	Team	Apps	(Gls)
2003–2005	Ventforet Kofu	23	(2)
2006–2007	Matsumoto Yamaga FC	24	(22)
2006	→V-Varen Nagasaki (loan)	0	(0)
2008	FC Ryukyu	5	(1)
Total		52	(25)
- * Club domestic league appearances and goals

Hidehito Shirao (白尾 秀人, Shirao Hidehito; born September 30, 1980) is a former Japanese football player.

== Club statistics ==
Club performance			League		Cup		Total	
Season	Club	League	Apps	Goals	Apps	Goals	Apps	Goals
Japan			League		Emperor's Cup		Total	
1999	Kokushikan University	Football League	2	2	2	2	4	4
2000	Kokushikan University	Football League	5	3	-		5	3
2001	Kokushikan University	Football League	5	3	-		5	3
2002	Kokushikan University	Football League	13	6			13	6
2003	Ventforet Kofu	J2 League	12	1	0	0	12	1
2004	Ventforet Kofu	J2 League	8	1	1	0	9	1
2005	Ventforet Kofu	J2 League	3	0	0	0	3	0
2006	Matsumoto Yamaga FC	Regional Leagues	14	14	2	1	16	15
2006	V-Varen Nagasaki	Regional Leagues	0	0	0	0	0	0
2007	Matsumoto Yamaga FC	Regional Leagues	10	8	-		10	8
2008	FC Ryukyu	Football League	5	1	-		5	1
Total			77	39	5	3	82	42
