= Jatco SC =

- Full name: Jatco Soccer Club
- Founded: 1972
- Dissolved: 2003
- Ground: Numazu, Shizuoka, Japan

Jatco SC (ジヤトコサッカー部) was a Japanese football club based in Numazu, Shizuoka. The club had played in Japan Football League.

== Club name ==
- 1972–1999; Jatco
- 2000–2001; Jatco TT
- 2002–2003; Jatco

== See also ==
- Azul Claro Numazu, successor club in the location
