= List of Yokohama F. Marinos managers =

The following is a list of managers of Yokohama F. Marinos and their major honours from the beginning of the club's official managerial records in 1993 to the present day. As of the start of the 2011 season, Yokohama F. Marinos have had 15 full-time managers.

== Managers ==
As of 8 May 2022. Statistics include competitive matches only. Caretakers are shown in italics.

Name	Nationality	From	To	P	W	D	L	GF	GA	Win %	Honours and/or notes
Hidehiko Shimizu	Japan	1993	1994								
Jorge Solari	Argentina	10 March 1995	1995								J.League 1° stage champions 1995
Hiroshi Hayano	Japan	1995	31 December 1996								J.League champions 1995
Xabier Azkargorta	Spain	1 January 1997	31 December 1998	79	49	1	29	175	133	62.03	
Antonio de la Cruz	Spain	1 January 1999	31 December 1999	39	24	4	11	75	44	61.54	
Osvaldo Ardiles	Argentina	January 2000	2 June 2001	53	28	5	20	88	71	52.83	J.League 1° stage champions 2000
Yoshiaki Shimojo	Japan	2 June 2001	22 July 2001	7	2	1	4	8	10	28.57	
Sebastião Lazaroni	Brazil	22 July 2001	9 October 2002	52	32	9	11	74	40	61.54	J.League Cup 2001
Yoshiaki Shimojo	Japan	9 October 2002	31 December 2002	9	3	2	4	11	10	33.33	
Takeshi Okada	Japan	1 January 2003	24 August 2006	148	70	37	41	222	175	47.30	J.League 1° stage champions 2003, 2004, J.League 2° stage champions 2003, J.League champions 2003, 2004
Takashi Mizunuma	Japan	24 August 2006	31 December 2006	18	8	2	8	25	21	44.44	
Hiroshi Hayano	Japan	1 January 2007	31 December 2007	45	18	10	17	76	57	40.00	
Takashi Kuwahara	Japan	1 January 2008	14 July 2008	23	8	6	9	27	20	34.78	
Kokichi Kimura	Japan	14 July 2008	31 December 2009	69	27	23	19	99	70	39.13	
Kazushi Kimura	Japan	1 January 2010	31 December 2011	85	40	18	27	132	100	47.06	
Yasuhiro Higuchi	Japan	1 January 2012	8 December 2014	140	66	35	39	191	137	47.14	Emperor's Cup 2013
Erick Mombaerts	France	14 December 2014	31 December 2017	138	65	34	39	195	142	47.10	
Ange Postecoglou	Australia	1 January 2018	10 June 2021	161	79	31	51	297	217	49.07	J1 League champions 2019
Hideki Matsunaga	Japan	10 June 2021	18 July 2021	5	4	0	1	8	4	80.00	
Kevin Muscat	Australia	18 July 2021	Present	35	20	7	8	62	31	57.14	
