= Shinobu Ikeda =

Japanese footballer

Shinobu Ikeda 池田 司信
Personal information
- Full name: Shinobu Ikeda
- Date of birth: January 5, 1962 (age 64)
- Place of birth: Shizuoka, Japan
- Height: 1.64 m (5 ft 4 1/2 in)
- Position: Defender

Youth career
- 1977–1979: Shizuoka Gakuen High School

Senior career*
| Years | Team | Apps | (Gls) |
| 1980–1990 | Nissan Motors | | |
| 1990–1992 | Matsushita Electric | 3 | (0) |
| Total | | 3 | (0) |

International career
| 1985 | Japan | 1 | (0) |

Managerial career
- 1998–1999: Matsushita Electric Panasonic Bambina
- 2000–2002: Japan Women
- 2001–2002: Japan Women U-20
- 2003–2004: Gunma Horikoshi
- 2007–2008: Zweigen Kanazawa
Medal record
Nissan Motors
| Winner | Japan Soccer League | 1988/89 |
| Winner | Japan Soccer League | 1989/90 |
| Runner-up | Japan Soccer League | 1983 |
| Runner-up | Japan Soccer League | 1984 |
| Winner | JSL Cup | 1988 |
| Winner | JSL Cup | 1989 |
| Runner-up | JSL Cup | 1983 |
| Runner-up | JSL Cup | 1985 |
| Runner-up | JSL Cup | 1986 |
| Winner | Emperor's Cup | 1983 |
| Winner | Emperor's Cup | 1985 |
| Winner | Emperor's Cup | 1988 |
| Winner | Emperor's Cup | 1989 |
Matsushita Electric
| Winner | Emperor's Cup | 1990 |
- * Club domestic league appearances and goals

Shinobu Ikeda (池田 司信, Ikeda Shinobu; born January 5, 1962) is a former Japanese football player. He played for Japan national team. He also managed Japan women's national team.

== Club career ==
Ikeda was born in Shizuoka Prefecture on January 5, 1962. After graduating from Shizuoka Gakuen High School, he joined Nissan Motors in 1980. The club won the 1983 and 1985 Emperor's Cup. From 1988 to 1990, the club won all three major titles in Japan: the Japan Soccer League, the JSL Cup, and the Emperor's Cup, for two years in a row. The club also won the 1989 Emperor's Cup. He moved to Matsushita Electric in 1990. The club won the 1990 Emperor's Cup. He retired in 1992.

== National team career ==
On June 4, 1985, Ikeda debuted for Japan national team against Malaysia.

== Coaching career ==
After retirement, Ikeda started coaching career at Gamba Osaka (former Matsushita Electric) in 1992. In 1998, he became a manager for L.League club Matsushita Electric Panasonic Bambina and managed until 1999. In 2000, he became a manager for Japan women's national team. He managed at 2001 AFC Women's Championship and Japan won the 2nd place. He managed until April 2002. He also managed Japan U-20 women's national team for 2002 U-19 Women's World Championship. After that, he managed Gunma Horikoshi (2003-2004) and Zweigen Kanazawa (2007-2008).

== Club statistics ==
| Club performance | | | League | | Cup | | League Cup | | Total | |
| Season | Club | League | Apps | Goals | Apps | Goals | Apps | Goals | Apps | Goals |
| Japan | | | League | | Emperor's Cup | | JSL Cup | | Total | |
|---|---|---|---|---|---|---|---|---|---|---|
| 1980 | Nissan Motors | JSL Division 1 | 0 | 0 | | | | | 0 | 0 |
| 1981 | Nissan Motors | JSL Division 2 | | | | | | | | |
| 1982 | Nissan Motors | JSL Division 1 | 1 | 0 | | | | | 1 | 0 |
| 1983 | Nissan Motors | JSL Division 1 | 11 | 0 | | | | | 11 | 0 |
| 1984 | Nissan Motors | JSL Division 1 | 16 | 0 | | | | | 16 | 0 |
| 1985/86 | Nissan Motors | JSL Division 1 | 14 | 0 | | | | | 14 | 0 |
| 1986/87 | Nissan Motors | JSL Division 1 | 11 | 0 | | | | | 11 | 0 |
| 1987/88 | Nissan Motors | JSL Division 1 | 15 | 0 | | | | | 15 | 0 |
| 1988/89 | Nissan Motors | JSL Division 1 | 1 | 0 | | | | | 1 | 0 |
| 1989/90 | Nissan Motors | JSL Division 1 | 0 | 0 | | | 0 | 0 | 0 | 0 |
| 1990/91 | Matsushita Electric | JSL Division 1 | 3 | 0 | | | 1 | 0 | 4 | 0 |
| 1991/92 | Matsushita Electric | JSL Division 1 | 0 | 0 | | | 0 | 0 | 0 | 0 |
| Total | | | 72 | 0 | 0 | 0 | 1 | 0 | 73 | 0 |

== National team statistics ==
Japan national team
| Year | Apps | Goals |
|---|---|---|
| 1985 | 1 | 0 |
| Total | 1 | 0 |
