= Shinji Tanaka =

Japanese footballer and manager

Shinji Tanaka 田中 真二
Personal information
- Full name: Shinji Tanaka
- Date of birth: September 25, 1960 (age 66)
- Place of birth: Saitama, Saitama, Japan
- Height: 1.74 m (5 ft 9 in)
- Positions: Midfielder; defender

Youth career
- 1976–1978: Saitama Urawa Minami High School
- 1979–1982: Chuo University

Senior career*
Years	Team	Apps	(Gls)
1983–1992	Nissan Motors	141	(0)
1992–1993	Urawa Reds	22	(0)
1994–1995	Kyoto Purple Sanga	6	(0)
Total		169	(0)

International career
1979	Japan U-20	3	(0)
1980–1985	Japan	17	(0)

Managerial career
- 1999–2006: Tokushima Vortis
Medal record
Nissan Motors
Winner	Japan Soccer League	1988/89
Winner	Japan Soccer League	1989/90
Runner-up	Japan Soccer League	1983
Runner-up	Japan Soccer League	1984
Runner-up	Japan Soccer League	1990/91
Runner-up	Japan Soccer League	1991/92
Winner	JSL Cup	1988
Winner	JSL Cup	1989
Winner	JSL Cup	1990
Runner-up	JSL Cup	1983
Runner-up	JSL Cup	1985
Runner-up	JSL Cup	1986
Winner	Emperor's Cup	1983
Winner	Emperor's Cup	1985
Winner	Emperor's Cup	1988
Winner	Emperor's Cup	1989
Winner	Emperor's Cup	1991
Runner-up	Emperor's Cup	1990
- * Club domestic league appearances and goals

Shinji Tanaka (田中 真二, Tanaka Shinji; born September 25, 1960) is a former Japanese football player and manager. He played for Japan national team.

== Club career ==
Tanaka was born in Saitama on September 25, 1960. After graduating from Chuo University, he joined Nissan Motors in 1983. The club won 1983 and 1985 Emperor's Cup. From 1988 to 1990, the club won all three major title in Japan; Japan Soccer League, JSL Cup and Emperor's Cup for 2 years in a row. He was also selected Best Eleven 1989–90. In 1990s, he lost opportunity to play in the match. He moved to J1 League club Urawa Reds in 1992 and Japan Football League club Kyoto Purple Sanga in 1994. He retired in 1995.

== National team career ==
In August 1979, when Tanaka was a Chuo University student, he was selected Japan U-20 national team for 1979 World Youth Championship and he played all 3 games. In March 1980, he was selected Japan national team for 1980 Summer Olympics qualification. At this qualification, on March 30, he debuted against Malaysia. In December, he also played at 1982 World Cup qualification. In 1984, he played at 1984 Summer Olympics qualification for the first time in 3 years. In 1985, he also played at 1986 World Cup qualification. He played 17 games for Japan until 1985.

== Coaching career ==
After retirement, Tanaka became a manager for Japan Football League club Otsuka Pharmaceutical (later Tokushima Vortis). The club won the champions in 2003 and 2004 and was promoted to J2 League. He was sacked in September 2006.

== Club statistics ==
Club performance			League		Cup		League Cup		Total	
Season	Club	League	Apps	Goals	Apps	Goals	Apps	Goals	Apps	Goals
Japan			League		Emperor's Cup		J.League Cup		Total	
1983	Nissan Motors	JSL Division 1	18	0					18	0
1984	Nissan Motors	JSL Division 1	15	0					15	0
1985/86	Nissan Motors	JSL Division 1	22	0					22	0
1986/87	Nissan Motors	JSL Division 1	19	0					19	0
1987/88	Nissan Motors	JSL Division 1	22	0					22	0
1988/89	Nissan Motors	JSL Division 1	22	0					22	0
1989/90	Nissan Motors	JSL Division 1	22	0			4	0	26	0
1990/91	Nissan Motors	JSL Division 1	0	0			4	0	4	0
1991/92	Nissan Motors	JSL Division 1	1	0			0	0	1	0
1992	Urawa Reds	J1 League	-		4	0	9	0	13	0
1993	Urawa Reds	J1 League	22	0	0	0	0	0	22	0
1994	Kyoto Purple Sanga	Football League	6	0	3	0	-		9	0
1995	Kyoto Purple Sanga	Football League	0	0	0	0	-		0	0
Total			169	0	7	0	17	0	193	0

== National team statistics ==
Japan national team
Year	Apps	Goals
1980	4	0
1981	8	0
1982	0	0
1983	0	0
1984	2	0
1985	3	0
Total	17	0

== Managerial statistics ==
Team	From	To	Record				
Team	From	To	G	W	D	L	Win %
Tokushima Vortis	2005	2006	83	18	24	41	21.69
Total			83	18	24	41	21.69
