= Takeshi Koshida =

Japanese footballer

Takeshi Koshida 越田 剛史
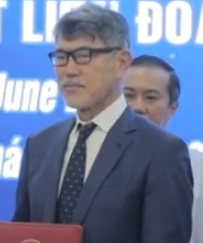
- Takeshi Koshida in 2023

Personal information
- Full name: Takeshi Koshida
- Date of birth: October 19, 1960 (age 66)
- Place of birth: Kanazawa, Ishikawa, Japan
- Height: 1.82 m (5 ft 11 1/2 in)
- Position: Defender

Youth career
- 1976–1978: Kanazawa Sakuragaoka High School

College career
Years	Team	Apps	(Gls)
1979–1982	University of Tsukuba		

Senior career*
Years	Team	Apps	(Gls)
1983–1989	Nissan Motors	97	(6)
1990–1996	Kanazawa SC		
Total		97	(6)

International career
1979	Japan U-20	3	(0)
1980–1985	Japan	19	(0)

Managerial career
- 2006–2010: Zweigen Kanazawa (Technical director)
- 2010–2023: Hokuriku University (Sporting director)
- 2023–: Vietnam (Technical director)
- 2023–: Vietnam women (Technical director)
Medal record
Nissan Motors
Winner	Japan Soccer League	1988/89
Runner-up	Japan Soccer League	1983
Runner-up	Japan Soccer League	1984
Winner	JSL Cup	1988
Runner-up	JSL Cup	1983
Runner-up	JSL Cup	1985
Runner-up	JSL Cup	1986
Winner	Emperor's Cup	1983
Winner	Emperor's Cup	1985
Winner	Emperor's Cup	1988
- * Club domestic league appearances and goals

Takeshi Koshida (越田 剛史, Koshida Takeshi; born October 19, 1960) is a Japanese football manager and former footballer. He is the technical director of Vietnam national football team and Vietnam women's national football team.

== Club career ==
Koshida was born in Kanazawa on October 19, 1960. After graduating from University of Tsukuba, he joined Nissan Motors in 1983. The club won 1983 and 1985 Emperor's Cup. In 1988-89 season, although the club won JSL Cup and Emperor's Cup, he left the club later in the season. In 1990, he returned to his hometown and joined Japanese Regional Leagues club Kanazawa SC. He retired in 1996.

== International career ==
In August 1979, when Koshida was a University of Tsukuba student, he was selected by the Japan U-20 national team for the 1979 World Youth Championship and played in three matches. In December 1980, he was selected by the Japan national team for the 1982 World Cup qualification. On December 22, he debuted against Singapore. He played at the 1982 Asian Games, 1984 Summer Olympics qualification, and the 1986 World Cup qualification. He played 19 games for Japan until 1985.

== Club statistics ==
Club performance			League	
Season	Club	League	Apps	Goals
Japan			League	
1983	Nissan Motors	JSL Division 1	15	1
1984	Nissan Motors	JSL Division 1	16	1
1985/86	Nissan Motors	JSL Division 1	21	2
1986/87	Nissan Motors	JSL Division 1	17	1
1987/88	Nissan Motors	JSL Division 1	12	1
1988/89	Nissan Motors	JSL Division 1	16	0
Total			97	6

== National team statistics ==
Japan national team
Year	Apps	Goals
1980	1	0
1981	1	0
1982	7	0
1983	6	0
1984	3	0
1985	1	0
Total	19	0
