= Nobutoshi Kaneda =

Japanese footballer

Nobutoshi Kaneda 金田 喜稔
Personal information
- Full name: Nobutoshi Kaneda
- Date of birth: February 16, 1958 (age 68)
- Place of birth: Fuchu, Hiroshima, Japan
- Height: 1.68 m (5 ft 6 in)
- Positions: Forward; midfielder

Youth career
- 1973–1975: Hiroshima Kogyo High School

College career
| Years | Team | Apps | (Gls) |
| 1976–1979 | Chuo University | | |

Senior career*
| Years | Team | Apps | (Gls) |
| 1980–1991 | Nissan Motors | 157 | (21) |
| Total | | 157 | (21) |

International career
| 1977–1984 | Japan | 58 | (6) |
Medal record
Nissan Motors
| Winner | Japan Soccer League | 1988/89 |
| Winner | Japan Soccer League | 1989/90 |
| Runner-up | Japan Soccer League | 1983 |
| Runner-up | Japan Soccer League | 1984 |
| Runner-up | Japan Soccer League | 1990/91 |
| Winner | JSL Cup | 1988 |
| Winner | JSL Cup | 1989 |
| Winner | JSL Cup | 1990 |
| Runner-up | JSL Cup | 1983 |
| Runner-up | JSL Cup | 1985 |
| Runner-up | JSL Cup | 1986 |
| Winner | Emperor's Cup | 1983 |
| Winner | Emperor's Cup | 1985 |
| Winner | Emperor's Cup | 1988 |
| Winner | Emperor's Cup | 1989 |
| Runner-up | Emperor's Cup | 1990 |
- * Club domestic league appearances and goals

Nobutoshi Kaneda (金田 喜稔, Kaneda Nobutoshi; born February 16, 1958) is a former Japanese football player. He played for Japan national team.

== Club career ==
Kaneda was born in Fuchu, Hiroshima on February 16, 1958. After graduating from Chuo University, he joined Nissan Motors in 1980. The club won the 1983 and 1985 Emperor's Cups. From 1988 to 1990, the club won all three major titles in Japan: the Japan Soccer League, the JSL Cup, and the Emperor's Cup for two consecutive seasons. He retired in 1991. He played 157 games and scored 21 goals while in the league. He was selected as one of the Best Eleven in 1983.

== National team career ==
On June 15, 1977, when Kaneda was a Chuo University student, he debuted and scored a goal for the Japan national team against South Korea. At this time, he was 19 years and that was a record for the youngest goal scorer in the Japan national team. He was selected to play for Japan in the 1978 and 1982 Asian Games. He played 58 games and scored 6 goals for Japan until 1984.

== Club statistics ==
| Club performance | | | League | | Cup | | League Cup | | Total | |
| Season | Club | League | Apps | Goals | Apps | Goals | Apps | Goals | Apps | Goals |
| Japan | | | League | | Emperor's Cup | | JSL Cup | | Total | |
|---|---|---|---|---|---|---|---|---|---|---|
| 1980 | Nissan Motors | JSL Division 1 | 18 | 1 | | | | | 18 | 1 |
| 1981 | Nissan Motors | JSL Division 2 | 18 | 2 | | | | | 18 | 2 |
| 1982 | Nissan Motors | JSL Division 1 | 18 | 2 | | | | | 18 | 2 |
| 1983 | Nissan Motors | JSL Division 1 | 18 | 3 | | | | | 18 | 3 |
| 1984 | Nissan Motors | JSL Division 1 | 15 | 3 | | | | | 15 | 3 |
| 1985/86 | Nissan Motors | JSL Division 1 | 4 | 0 | | | | | 4 | 0 |
| 1986/87 | Nissan Motors | JSL Division 1 | 21 | 4 | | | | | 21 | 4 |
| 1987/88 | Nissan Motors | JSL Division 1 | 16 | 1 | | | | | 16 | 1 |
| 1988/89 | Nissan Motors | JSL Division 1 | 6 | 0 | | | | | 6 | 0 |
| 1989/90 | Nissan Motors | JSL Division 1 | 19 | 5 | | | 0 | 0 | 19 | 5 |
| 1990/91 | Nissan Motors | JSL Division 1 | 4 | 0 | | | 1 | 0 | 5 | 0 |
| Total | | | 157 | 21 | 0 | 0 | 1 | 0 | 158 | 21 |

== National team statistics ==
Japan national team
| Year | Apps | Goals |
|---|---|---|
| 1977 | 1 | 1 |
| 1978 | 14 | 0 |
| 1979 | 3 | 0 |
| 1980 | 12 | 2 |
| 1981 | 6 | 0 |
| 1982 | 8 | 0 |
| 1983 | 8 | 2 |
| 1984 | 6 | 1 |
| Total | 58 | 6 |
