= Hajime Ishii (footballer) =

Japanese footballer and manager

Hajime Ishii 石井 肇
Personal information
- Full name: Hajime Ishii
- Date of birth: May 26, 1959 (age 67)
- Place of birth: Kanagawa, Japan
- Height: 1.78 m (5 ft 10 in)
- Position: Defender

Youth career
- 1975–1977: Nihon University High School
- 1978–1981: Nihon University

Senior career*
Years	Team	Apps	(Gls)
1982–1988	Nissan Motors	8	(0)
1988–1991	Otsuka Pharmaceutical		
Total		8+	(0+)

Managerial career
- 1993–1995: Otsuka Pharmaceutical
- 1998: Consadole Sapporo
- 2003: Vegalta Sendai
- 2017: Shanghai JuJu Sports
Medal record
Nissan Motors
Runner-up	Japan Soccer League	1983
Runner-up	Japan Soccer League	1984
Runner-up	JSL Cup	1983
Runner-up	JSL Cup	1985
Runner-up	JSL Cup	1986
Winner	Emperor's Cup	1983
Winner	Emperor's Cup	1985
- * Club domestic league appearances and goals

Hajime Ishii (石井 肇, Ishii Hajime; born May 26, 1959) is a former Japanese football player and manager.

== Playing career ==
Ishii was born in Kanagawa Prefecture on May 26, 1959. After graduating from Nihon University, he joined Nissan Motors in 1982. In 1988, he moved to Otsuka Pharmaceutical.

== Coaching career ==
In 1988, player Ishii also became an assistant coach at Otsuka Pharmaceutical. In 1993, he was promoted to manager. In 1997, he moved to Consadole Sapporo and became an assistant coach. In October 1998, manager Hugo Fernandez was sacked and Ishii was promoted to manager. In 2003, he moved to Vegalta Sendai. In September, he managed as caretaker.

== Club statistics ==
Club performance			League		Cup		League Cup		Total	
Season	Club	League	Apps	Goals	Apps	Goals	Apps	Goals	Apps	Goals
Japan			League		Emperor's Cup		League Cup		Total	
1982	Nissan Motors	JSL Division 1								
1983	Nissan Motors	JSL Division 1								
1984	Nissan Motors	JSL Division 1								
1985/86	Nissan Motors	JSL Division 1								
1986/87	Nissan Motors	JSL Division 1								
1987/88	Nissan Motors	JSL Division 1								
1988/89	Otsuka Pharmaceutical	Prefectural Leagues								
1989	Otsuka Pharmaceutical	Regional Leagues								
1990/91	Otsuka Pharmaceutical	JSL Division 2	22	1	-		1	0	23	1
Total	Japan		22	1	0	0	1	0	23	1
Career total			22	1	0	0	1	0	23	1

== Managerial statistics ==
Team	From	To	Record				
Team	From	To	G	W	D	L	Win %
Consadole Sapporo	1998	1998	6	3	0	3	50.00
Vegalta Sendai	2003	2003	1	0	1	0	0.00
Total			7	3	1	3	42.86
