= 1983 in Japanese football =

1983 season

Japanese football in 1983

== Japan Soccer League ==
=== Division 1 ===
Pos	Team	Pld	W	D	L	GF	GA	GD	Pts	Qualification or relegation
1	Yomiuri	18	12	3	3	27	13	+14	27	Champions
2	Nissan	18	11	3	4	28	17	+11	25	
3	Fujita Engineering	18	7	7	4	18	15	+3	21	
4	Yamaha Motors	18	7	5	6	25	20	+5	19	
5	Yanmar Diesel	18	6	7	5	19	21	−2	19	
6	Mitsubishi Motors	18	6	4	8	17	16	+1	16	
7	Furukawa Electric	18	6	3	9	13	15	−2	15	
8	Honda	18	4	6	8	17	23	−6	14	
9	Hitachi	18	3	6	9	14	22	−8	12	To promotion/relegation Series
10	Mazda	18	5	2	11	15	31	−16	12	Relegated to Second Division

=== Division 2 ===
Pos	Team	Pld	W	D	L	GF	GA	GD	Pts	Promotion or relegation
1	Nippon Kokan	18	13	4	1	39	12	+27	30	Promoted to First Division
2	Sumitomo	18	8	8	2	33	27	+6	24	To promotion/relegation Series with First Division
3	Toshiba	18	8	4	6	38	23	+15	20	
4	Nippon Steel	18	7	5	6	29	21	+8	19	
5	Toyota Motors	18	7	5	6	23	30	−7	19	
6	Tanabe Pharmaceuticals	18	7	4	7	29	29	0	18	
7	Fujitsu	18	6	4	8	26	26	0	16	
8	Kofu Club	18	4	6	8	29	40	−11	14	
9	Toho Titanium	18	5	2	11	21	42	−21	12	To promotion/relegation Series with Regional Series
10	Saitama Teachers	18	4	1	13	14	28	−14	9	Relegated to Regional Leagues

== Emperor's Cup ==
January 1, 1984

Nissan Motors	2–0	Yanmar Diesel
? (?) ? (?)

National Stadium

== National team ==
=== Results ===
1983.02.12	Japan	2–2	Syria	Damascus, Syria
	Hara 68', 78'	JFA	? (?) ? (?)

1983.02.25	Japan	0–1	Qatar	Doha, Qatar
		JFA	? (?)

1983.03.06	Japan	1–1	South Korea	Tokyo, Japan
	Tanaka 6'	JFA	? (?)	Stadium: Tokyo National Stadium

1983.06.07	Japan	1–0	Syria	Tokyo, Japan
	Kaneda 63'	JFA		Stadium: Tokyo National Stadium

1983.09.04	Japan	7–0	Philippines	Tokyo, Japan
	Hara 23'; Kimura 27', 76'; Kato 37'; Yokoyama 41'; Tanaka 48', 78'	JFA		Stadium: Tokyo National Stadium

1983.09.07	Japan	10–1	Philippines	Tokyo, Japan
	3' (o.g.); Maeda 10'; Kimura 28', 35', 77', 82', 89'; Hara 29'; Yokoyama 46'; Kaneda 73'	JFA	? (?)	Stadium: Tokyo National Stadium

1983.09.15	Japan	2–0	Chinese Taipei	Tokyo, Japan
	Hara 43'; Kimura 80'	JFA		Stadium: Tokyo National Stadium

1983.09.20	Japan	1–1	Chinese Taipei	Taipei, Chinese Taipei
	Maeda 83'	JFA	? (?)

1983.09.25	Japan	1–3	New Zealand	Auckland, New Zealand
	Hara 20'	JFA	? (?) ? (?) ? (?)

1983.10.07	Japan	0–1	New Zealand	Tokyo, Japan
		JFA	? (?)	Stadium: Tokyo National Stadium

=== Players statistics ===
Player	-1982	02.12	02.25	03.06	06.07	09.04	09.07	09.15	09.20	09.25	10.07	1983	Total
Hideki Maeda	55(9)	O	O	O	-	-	O(1)	-	O(1)	O	O	7(2)	62(11)
Mitsuhisa Taguchi	46(0)	O	O	O	O	-	O	O	O	O	O	9(0)	55(0)
Nobutoshi Kaneda	44(3)	-	-	O	O(1)	O	O(1)	O	O	O	O	8(2)	52(5)
Hiromi Hara	29(7)	O(2)	O	O	O	O(1)	O(1)	O(1)	O	O(1)	O	10(6)	39(13)
Hisashi Kato	24(2)	-	-	O	O	O(1)	-	O	O	O	O	7(1)	31(3)
Masafumi Yokoyama	23(8)	-	-	-	O	O(1)	O(1)	O	O	O	O	7(2)	30(10)
Kazushi Kimura	21(5)	O	O	O	O	O(2)	O(5)	O(1)	O	O	O	10(8)	31(13)
Satoshi Tsunami	18(0)	O	O	O	O	O	O	O	O	O	O	10(0)	28(0)
Tetsuo Sugamata	17(0)	O	O	O	O	-	-	-	O	-	-	5(0)	22(0)
Kazuo Ozaki	16(3)	-	-	O	-	-	-	-	-	-	-	1(0)	17(3)
Akihiro Nishimura	16(0)	O	O	O	O	O	O	O	O	O	O	10(0)	26(0)
Yahiro Kazama	16(0)	-	-	-	-	O	-	O	-	O	-	3(0)	19(0)
Koichi Hashiratani	12(0)	-	-	-	O	-	-	-	-	-	-	1(0)	13(0)
Takeshi Okada	10(1)	O	O	-	O	-	O	O	O	O	-	7(0)	17(1)
Takeshi Koshida	9(0)	O	-	-	-	O	O	O	-	O	O	6(0)	15(0)
Hiroshi Yoshida	7(1)	O	O	-	-	-	-	-	-	-	-	2(0)	9(1)
Toshio Matsuura	6(1)	O	O	O	-	-	O	-	O	-	-	5(0)	11(1)
Koji Tanaka	6(0)	O	O	O(1)	O	O(2)	O	O	-	-	O	8(3)	14(3)
Kazumi Tsubota	5(0)	-	-	-	-	O	-	-	-	-	-	1(0)	6(0)
Yutaka Ikeuchi	0(0)	O	O	-	-	-	-	-	-	-	O	3(0)	3(0)
Toru Yoshikawa	0(0)	O	-	-	-	-	-	-	-	-	-	1(0)	1(0)

== Births ==
- 25 January: Yasuyuki Konno
