= Hiroshi Hayano =

Japanese footballer and manager

Hiroshi Hayano 早野 宏史
Personal information
- Date of birth: November 14, 1955 (age 70)
- Place of birth: Kanagawa, Japan
- Height: 1.69 m (5 ft 6 1/2 in)
- Position: Forward

Youth career
- 1971–1973: Ikuta High School
- 1974–1977: Chuo University

Senior career*
Years	Team	Apps	(Gls)
1978–1986	Nissan Motors		

Managerial career
- 1990–1991: Nissan FC Ladies
- 1995–1996: Yokohama Marinos
- 1999–2001: Gamba Osaka
- 2004–2005: Kashiwa Reysol
- 2006: Yokohama F. Marinos
Medal record
Nissan Motors
Runner-up	Japan Soccer League	1983
Runner-up	Japan Soccer League	1984
Runner-up	JSL Cup	1983
Runner-up	JSL Cup	1985
Winner	Emperor's Cup	1983
Winner	Emperor's Cup	1985
- * Club domestic league appearances and goals

Hiroshi Hayano (早野 宏史, Hayano Hiroshi; born November 14, 1955) is a Japanese former football player and manager.

== Playing career ==
Hayano was born in Kanagawa Prefecture on November 14, 1955. After graduating from Chuo University, he played for Nissan Motors from 1978 to 1986.

== Coaching career ==
After retirement, Hayano started coaching career at Nissan Motors (later Yokohama F. Marinos). He managed youth team and Nissan FC Ladies until 1991. In 1992, he became assistant coach for top team. In June 1995, he was promoted to manager to replace Jorge Solari for health reasons. He led the club to won the champions. He managed until 1996. After that, he managed Gamba Osaka (1999–2001), Kashiwa Reysol (2004–2005) and Yokohama F. Marinos (2006).

== Managerial statistics ==
Team	From	To	Record				
Team	From	To	G	W	D	L	Win %
Yokohama Marinos	1995	1996	66	35	0	31	53.03
Gamba Osaka	1999	2001	68	31	4	33	45.59
Kashiwa Reysol	2004	2005	49	10	18	21	20.41
Yokohama F. Marinos	2007	2007	34	14	8	12	41.18
Total			217	90	30	97	41.47
