= Kazumi Tsubota =

Japanese footballer

Kazumi Tsubota 坪田 和美
Personal information
- Full name: Kazumi Tsubota
- Date of birth: January 23, 1956 (age 70)
- Place of birth: Nagasaki, Japan
- Height: 1.77 m (5 ft 9 1/2 in)
- Position: Goalkeeper

Youth career
- Shimabara Commercial High School
- Hosei University

Senior career*
Years	Team	Apps	(Gls)
1979–1992	Yanmar Diesel	170	(0)

International career
1981–1984	Japan	7	(0)
Medal record
Yanmar Diesel
Winner	Japan Soccer League	1980
Winner	JSL Cup	1983
Winner	JSL Cup	1984
Runner-up	JSL Cup	1982
Runner-up	Emperor's Cup	1983
- * Club domestic league appearances and goals

Kazumi Tsubota (坪田 和美, Tsubota Kazumi; born January 23, 1956) is a former Japanese football player. He played for Japan national team.

== Club career ==
Tsubota was born in Nagasaki Prefecture on January 23, 1956. After graduating from Hosei University, he joined Yanmar Diesel in 1979. The club won the league champions in 1981. The club also won 1983 and 1984 JSL Cup. He retired in 1992. He played 170 games in the league.

== National team career ==
On March 8, 1981, Tsubota debuted for Japan national team against South Korea. In 1983 and 1984, he played at 1984 Summer Olympics qualification. He played 7 games for Japan until 1984.

== National team statistics ==
Japan national team
Year	Apps	Goals
1981	5	0
1982	0	0
1983	1	0
1984	1	0
Total	7	0
