= Hiroshi Soejima =

Japanese footballer and manager

Hiroshi Soejima 副島 博志
Personal information
- Full name: Hiroshi Soejima
- Date of birth: July 26, 1959 (age 67)
- Place of birth: Saga, Saga, Japan
- Height: 1.81 m (5 ft 11 1/2 in)
- Position: Midfielder

Youth career
- 1975–1977: Saga Shogyo High School

Senior career*
Years	Team	Apps	(Gls)
1978–1991	Yanmar Diesel	167	(6)
1991–1992	Sumitomo Metal	15	(0)
Total		182	(6)

International career
1980	Japan	3	(0)

Managerial career
- 2000–2001: Cerezo Osaka
- 2002: Sagan Tosu
- 2003: Vissel Kobe
- 2010–2012: Thespa Kusatsu
- 2015: Ayutthaya
Medal record
Yanmar Diesel
Winner	Japan Soccer League	1980
Runner-up	Japan Soccer League	1978
Winner	JSL Cup	1983
Winner	JSL Cup	1984
Runner-up	JSL Cup	1982
Runner-up	Emperor's Cup	1983
- * Club domestic league appearances and goals

Hiroshi Soejima (副島 博志, Soejima Hiroshi; born July 26, 1959) is a former Japanese football player and manager. He played for Japan national team.

== Club career ==
Soejima was born in Saga on July 26, 1959. After graduating from high school, he joined Yanmar Diesel in 1978. After reserve team in 2 season, he was promoted top team in 1980. In 1980, the club won the champions in Japan Soccer League and he was selected Best Eleven. The club also won 1983 and 1984 Emperor's Cup. In 1991, he moved to Division 2 club Sumitomo Metal and played in 1 season. He retired in 1992.

== National team career ==
On June 9, 1980, Soejima debuted for Japan national team against Hong Kong. He played 3 games for Japan in 1980.

== Coaching career ==
After retirement, Soejima started coaching career at Kashima Antlers (former Sumitomo Metal) in 1992. He moved to Gamba Osaka in 1996. In 1998, he returned to Cerezo Osaka (former Yanmar Diesel) and became a manager in 2000. He was sacked in August 2001. He managed his local club Sagan Tosu in 2002 and Vissel Kobe in 2003. In 2005, he returned to Cerezo Osaka and managed youth team until 2008. He moved to Kataller Toyama and became a coach. In 2010, he moved to Thespa Kusatsu and managed until 2012. In 2015, he moved to Thailand and became a manager Ayutthaya.

== Club statistics ==
Club performance			League		Cup		League Cup		Total	
Season	Club	League	Apps	Goals	Apps	Goals	Apps	Goals	Apps	Goals
Japan			League		Emperor's Cup		JSL Cup		Total	
1980	Yanmar Diesel	JSL Division 1								
1981	Yanmar Diesel	JSL Division 1								
1982	Yanmar Diesel	JSL Division 1								
1983	Yanmar Diesel	JSL Division 1								
1984	Yanmar Diesel	JSL Division 1								
1985/86	Yanmar Diesel	JSL Division 1								
1986/87	Yanmar Diesel	JSL Division 1								
1987/88	Yanmar Diesel	JSL Division 1								
1988/89	Yanmar Diesel	JSL Division 1								
1989/90	Yanmar Diesel	JSL Division 1	11	0			1	0	12	0
1990/91	Yanmar Diesel	JSL Division 1	7	0			0	0	7	0
1991/92	Sumitomo Metal	JSL Division 2	15	0			2	0	17	0
Total			33	0	0	0	3	0	36	0

== National team statistics ==
Japan national team
Year	Apps	Goals
1980	3	0
Total	3	0

== Managerial statistics ==
Team	From	To	Record				
Team	From	To	G	W	D	L	Win %
Cerezo Osaka	2000	2001	47	20	2	25	42.55
Sagan Tosu	2002	2002	44	9	14	21	20.45
Vissel Kobe	2003	2003	30	8	6	16	26.67
Thespa Kusatsu	2010	2012	116	42	26	48	36.21
Total			237	79	48	110	33.33
