= Yoshiaki Shimojo =

Japanese footballer and manager

Yoshiaki Shimojo 下條 佳明
Personal information
- Full name: Yoshiaki Shimojo
- Date of birth: May 10, 1954 (age 72)
- Place of birth: Nagano, Japan
- Height: 1.76 m (5 ft 9 1/2 in)
- Position: Defender

Youth career
- Matsumoto Agatagaoka High School
- Waseda University

Senior career*
Years	Team	Apps	(Gls)
1978–1984	Nissan Motors		

Managerial career
- 1992–1994: Nissan FC Ladies
- 2001: Yokohama F. Marinos
- 2002: Yokohama F. Marinos
Medal record
Nissan Motors
Runner-up	Japan Soccer League	1983
Runner-up	Japan Soccer League	1984
Runner-up	JSL Cup	1983
Winner	Emperor's Cup	1983
- * Club domestic league appearances and goals

Yoshiaki Shimojo (下條 佳明, Shimojo Yoshiaki; born May 10, 1954) is a former Japanese football player and manager.

== Playing career ==
Shimojo was born in Nagano Prefecture on May 10, 1954. After graduating from Waseda University, he played for Nissan Motors from 1978 to 1984.

== Coaching career ==
After retirement, Shimojo became a coach at Nissan Motors (later Yokohama Marinos, Yokohama F. Marinos). In 1992, he became a manager for Nissan FC Ladies. In 1995, he became a coach for Yokohama Flügels. In 1996, he returned to Yokohama Marinos. He served as a coach and a team director until 2006. He also managed in 2001 and 2002.

== Managerial statistics ==
Team	From	To	Record				
Team	From	To	G	W	D	L	Win %
Yokohama F. Marinos	2001	2001	5	0	1	4	0.00
Yokohama F. Marinos	2002	2002	8	6	0	2	75.00
Total			13	6	1	6	46.15
