= 1983 Japanese Regional Leagues =

Japanese amateur leagues football season

Japanese Regional Leagues
- Season: 1983
- Promoted: Yokohama Tristar

Statistics of Japanese Regional Leagues for the 1983 season.

== Champions list ==
Region	Champions
Hokkaido	Sapporo Mazda
Tohoku	TDK
Kantō	Yokohama Tristar
Hokushi'netsu	Nissei Plastic Industrial
Tōkai	Daikyo Oil
Kansai	Matsushita Electric
Chūgoku	Mazda Auto Hiroshima
Shikoku	Teijin Matsuyama
Kyushu	Mitsubishi Chemical Kurosaki

== League standings ==
=== Hokkaido ===
Pos	Team	Pld	W	D	L	GF	GA	GD	Pts	Qualification
1	Sapporo Mazda	7	5	1	1	19	4	+15	11	Qualified for the 7th JSL Promotion Tournament
2	Nippon Steel Muroran	7	4	1	2	10	6	+4	9	
3	Blackpecker Hakodate	7	4	0	3	18	13	+5	8	
4	Nippon Oil Muroran	7	4	0	3	15	16	−1	8	
5	Sapporo	7	3	0	4	14	12	+2	6	
6	Hokushukai	7	3	0	4	8	20	−12	6	
7	Hakodate Mazda	7	1	2	4	14	16	−2	4	
8	Otaru Shuyukai	7	2	0	5	9	20	−11	4	

Source: RSSSF

=== Tohoku ===
Pos	Team	Pld	W	D	L	GF	GA	GD	Pts	Qualification
1	TDK	14	13	1	0	76	13	+63	27	Qualified for the 7th JSL Promotion Tournament
2	Morioka Zebra	14	9	2	3	37	16	+21	20	
3	Matsushima	14	9	1	4	42	24	+18	19	
4	Nippon Steel Kamaishi	14	6	2	6	28	21	+7	14	
5	Nitto Boseki Fukushima	14	5	3	6	26	35	−9	13	
6	Akita Toyota	14	4	0	10	13	54	−41	8	
7	Akisho Club	14	3	1	10	14	45	−31	7	
8	Kureha	14	2	0	12	16	44	−28	4	

Source: RSSSF

=== Kantō ===
Pos	Team	Pld	W	D	L	GF	GA	GD	Pts	Qualification or relegation
1	Yokohama Tristar	18	14	3	1	55	11	+44	31	Qualified for the 7th JSL Promotion Tournament
2	NTT Kanto	18	11	4	3	39	21	+18	26	
3	Ibaraki Teachers	18	11	2	5	46	21	+25	24	
4	Ibaraki Hitachi	18	9	4	5	37	20	+17	22	
5	Chiba Teachers	18	9	3	6	28	32	−4	21	
6	Mitsubishi Yowa	18	6	4	8	23	45	−22	16	
7	Furukawa Chiba	18	6	2	10	25	32	−7	14	
8	Hitachi Mito Katsuta	18	2	6	10	13	26	−13	10	
9	Pioneer Kawagoe	18	3	4	11	18	47	−29	10	Relegated
10	Tochigi Teachers	18	1	4	13	16	45	−29	6	Relegated

Source: RSSSF

==== Promotion Relegation Playoffs ====
January 29, 1984

Hitachi Tochigi (Kanto Adult Tournament 2nd place)	1-1	Hitachi Mito Katsuta (Kanto League 8th place)

Utsunomiya City Soccer Stadium, Utsunomiya

February 5, 1984

Hitachi Mito Katsuta (Kanto League 8th place)	4-0	Hitachi Tochigi (Kanto Adult Tournament 2nd place)

Katsuta-Ishikawa Movement, Hiroba
- Hitachi Mito Katsuta stayed in the Kanto Division after a 5-1 on aggregate victory.

=== Hokushi'netsu ===
Pos	Team	Pld	W	D	L	GF	GA	GD	Pts	Qualification or relegation
1	Nissei Plastic Industrial	9	9	0	0	35	6	+29	18	Qualified for the 7th JSL Promotion Tournament
2	Toyama Club	9	8	0	1	22	5	+17	16	
3	YKK	9	5	1	3	26	14	+12	11	
4	Fukui Bank	9	4	1	4	21	19	+2	9	
5	Teihens	9	4	1	4	13	22	−9	9	
6	Fukui Teachers	9	3	2	4	12	18	−6	8	
7	Yamaga	9	2	3	4	12	14	−2	7	
8	Kanazawa	9	2	1	6	12	27	−15	5	
9	Seiyū Club	9	2	0	7	14	26	−12	4	
10	Uozu Club	9	1	1	7	14	30	−16	3	Relegated

Source: RSSSF

=== Tōkai ===
Pos	Team	Pld	W	D	L	GF	GA	GD	Pts	Qualification or relegation (Note: Teams played each other once (9 matches), before the league split into two groups (the top five (Championship Group) and the bottom five (Relegation Group)) for the last four mataches.)
1	Daikyo Oil	13	11	1	1	34	10	+24	23	Qualified for the 7th JSL Promotion Tournament
2	Maruyasu	13	7	3	3	28	19	+9	17	
3	Seino Transportation	13	6	4	3	33	17	+16	16	
4	Yamaha Club	13	5	3	5	25	25	0	13	
5	Fujieda City Government	13	4	1	8	18	32	−14	9	
6	Nagoya	13	4	4	5	16	18	−2	12	
7	Tomoegawa Papers	13	4	3	6	18	30	−12	11	
8	Honda Hamayukai	13	4	2	7	15	19	−4	10	
9	Jatco	13	3	4	6	15	20	−5	10	Relegated
10	Shizuoka Gas	13	2	5	6	14	26	−12	9	Relegated

Source: RSSSF

=== Kansai ===
Pos	Team	Pld	W	D	L	GF	GA	GD	Pts	Qualification
1	Matsushita Electric	18	15	3	0	79	5	+74	33	Qualified for the 7th JSL Promotion Tournament
2	NTT Kinki	18	10	3	5	27	23	+4	23	
3	Dainichi Nippon Cable	18	9	3	6	24	24	0	21	
4	Osaka Gas	18	8	3	7	29	33	−4	19	
5	Kyoto Shiko Club	18	5	7	6	20	22	−2	17	
6	Kyoto Police	18	7	3	8	25	29	−4	17	
7	Mitsubishi Motors Kyoto	18	6	4	8	17	29	−12	16	
8	Hyogo Teachers	18	5	5	8	22	37	−15	15	
9	Osaka Teachers	18	6	2	10	20	31	−11	14	
10	Tanabe	18	2	1	15	16	46	−30	5	

Source: RSSSF

=== Chūgoku ===
Pos	Team	Pld	W	D	L	GF	GA	GD	Pts	Qualification
1	Mazda Auto Hiroshima	14	10	3	1	35	12	+23	23	Qualified for the 7th JSL Promotion Tournament
2	Yamaguchi Teachers	14	8	3	3	35	23	+12	19	
3	Kawasaki Steel Mizushima	14	7	4	3	24	15	+9	18	
4	Mitsubishi Oil	14	6	3	5	22	19	+3	15	
5	Tanabe Pharmaceuticals	14	6	3	5	25	22	+3	15	
6	Mitsui Shipbuilding	14	6	1	7	23	26	−3	13	
7	Hitachi Kasado	14	3	2	9	18	36	−18	8	
8	Masuda Club	14	0	1	13	15	44	−29	1	

Source: RSSSF

=== Shikoku ===
Pos	Team	Pld	W	D	L	GF	GA	GD	Pts	Qualification or relegation
1	Teijin Matsuyama	16	16	0	0	80	7	+73	32	Qualified for the 7th JSL Promotion Tournament
2	Takasho OB Club	16	10	1	5	45	32	+13	21	
3	Otsuka Pharmaceuticals	16	8	4	4	40	29	+11	20	
4	Nangoku Club	16	6	4	6	25	27	−2	16	
5	Daio Paper	16	6	3	7	45	54	−9	15	
6	Aiyu Club	16	5	4	7	32	36	−4	14	
7	Imabari Club	16	5	2	9	35	42	−7	12	
8	Showa Club	16	4	2	10	34	42	−8	10	
9	Taiho Pharmaceutical	16	1	2	13	15	82	−67	4	Relegated

Source: RSSSF

=== Kyushu ===
Pos	Team	Pld	W	D	L	GF	GA	GD	Pts	Qualification or relegation
1	Mitsubishi Chemical Kurosaki	9	6	2	1	34	10	+24	14	Qualified for the 7th JSL Promotion Tournament
2	Nippon Steel Oita	9	7	0	2	28	20	+8	14	
3	Mitsubishi Heavy Industries Nagasaki	9	5	2	2	30	16	+14	12	
4	Kagoshima Teachers	9	4	3	2	26	18	+8	11	
5	NTT Kumamoto	9	5	1	3	11	10	+1	11	
6	Saga Nanyo Club	9	4	1	4	26	21	+5	9	
7	Nakatsu Club	9	4	0	5	25	31	−6	8	
8	Kumamoto Teachers	9	4	0	5	24	29	−5	8	
9	Kawasoe Club	9	1	0	8	9	26	−17	2	
10	Kyocera Sendai	9	0	1	8	11	43	−32	1	Relegated

Source: RSSSF
