= Yuki Kaneko =

Yuki Kaneko may refer to:

- Yuki Kaneko (footballer, born 1982), Japanese footballer
- Yuki Kaneko (badminton) (born 1994), Japanese badminton player
- Yūki Kaneko (born 1987), Japanese voice actress
