= Soejima =

Soejima (written: 副島) is a Japanese surname. Notable people with the surname include:

- Hiroshi Soejima (副島 博志, born 1959), Japanese footballer and manager
- Kameli Soejima (born 1983), Fijian-born Japanese rugby union player
- Masazumi Soejima (副島 正純, born 1970), Japanese Paralympic wheelchair racer
- Shigenori Soejima (副島 成記, born 1974), Japanese character designer
- Soejima Taneomi (副島 種臣, 1828–1905), Japanese diplomat and statesman

== See also ==
- 8274 Soejima, a main-belt asteroid
