= 2000 Yokohama F. Marinos season =

Yokohama F. Marinos
2000 season
- Manager: Ardiles
- Stadium: International Stadium Yokohama
- J.League 1: Runners-up
- Emperor's Cup: Quarterfinals
- J.League Cup: Quarterfinals
- Top goalscorer: Yoo Sang-Chul (17)
- Average home league attendance: 16,644
Home colours	Away colours

2000 Yokohama F. Marinos season

== Competitions ==
Competitions	Position
J.League 1	Runners-up / 16 clubs
Emperor's Cup	Quarterfinals
J.League Cup	Quarterfinals

== Domestic results ==
=== J.League 1 ===
11 March 2000 1-1	Yokohama F. Marinos	0-1	FC Tokyo	International Stadium Yokohama
JST (UTC+09)

18 March 2000 1-2	Shimizu S-Pulse	1-2	Yokohama F. Marinos	Nihondaira Sports Stadium
JST (UTC+09)

25 March 2000 1-3	Yokohama F. Marinos	1-3	Júbilo Iwata	International Stadium Yokohama
JST (UTC+09)

1 April 2000 1-4	Kashima Antlers	2-3	Yokohama F. Marinos	Tokyo National Stadium
JST (UTC+09)

5 April 2000 1-5	Yokohama F. Marinos	1-0	Vissel Kobe	Yokohama Mitsuzawa Stadium
JST (UTC+09)

8 April 2000 1-6	Verdy Kawasaki	1-3	Yokohama F. Marinos	Tokyo National Stadium
JST (UTC+09)

15 April 2000 1-7	Yokohama F. Marinos	2-0	Nagoya Grampus Eight	International Stadium Yokohama
JST (UTC+09)

22 April 2000 1-8	Kashiwa Reysol	3-2 (GG) (a.e.t.)	Yokohama F. Marinos	Kashiwanoha Park Stadium
JST (UTC+09)

29 April 2000 1-9	Yokohama F. Marinos	4-1	Gamba Osaka	International Stadium Yokohama
JST (UTC+09)

3 May 2000 1-10	Sanfrecce Hiroshima	2-0	Yokohama F. Marinos	Hiroshima Big Arch
JST (UTC+09)

6 May 2000 1-11	Yokohama F. Marinos	2-1	Kyoto Purple Sanga	International Stadium Yokohama
JST (UTC+09)

13 May 2000 1-12	Avispa Fukuoka	2-4	Yokohama F. Marinos	Hakatanomori Football Stadium
JST (UTC+09)

17 May 2000 1-13	Yokohama F. Marinos	4-1	Kawasaki Frontale	International Stadium Yokohama
JST (UTC+09)

20 May 2000 1-14	Yokohama F. Marinos	2-3	Cerezo Osaka	Yokohama Mitsuzawa Stadium
JST (UTC+09)

27 May 2000 1-15	JEF United Ichihara	0-2	Yokohama F. Marinos	Tokyo National Stadium
JST (UTC+09)

24 June 2000 2-1	FC Tokyo	3-0	Yokohama F. Marinos	Tokyo National Stadium
JST (UTC+09)

1 July 2000 2-2	Yokohama F. Marinos	0-1	Shimizu S-Pulse	Tokyo National Stadium
JST (UTC+09)

8 July 2000 2-3	Kyoto Purple Sanga	1-3	Yokohama F. Marinos	Tottori Soccer Stadium
JST (UTC+09)

15 July 2000 2-4	Yokohama F. Marinos	4-2	Sanfrecce Hiroshima	Yokohama Mitsuzawa Stadium
JST (UTC+09)

22 July 2000 2-5	Gamba Osaka	2-1	Yokohama F. Marinos	Osaka Expo '70 Stadium
JST (UTC+09)

26 July 2000 2-6	Yokohama F. Marinos	1-0	Kashiwa Reysol	Yokohama Mitsuzawa Stadium
JST (UTC+09)

29 July 2000 2-7	Nagoya Grampus Eight	3-2	Yokohama F. Marinos	Mizuho Athletic Stadium
JST (UTC+09)

5 August 2000 2-8	Yokohama F. Marinos	1-1 (GG) (a.e.t.)	Kashima Antlers	Tokyo National Stadium
JST (UTC+09)

12 August 2000 2-9	Júbilo Iwata	4-0	Yokohama F. Marinos	Júbilo Iwata Stadium
JST (UTC+09)

19 August 2000 2-10	Yokohama F. Marinos	3-2	Verdy Kawasaki	Yokohama Mitsuzawa Stadium
JST (UTC+09)

8 November 2000 2-11	Vissel Kobe	2-4	Yokohama F. Marinos	Kobe Universiade Memorial Stadium
JST (UTC+09)

11 November 2000 2-12	Yokohama F. Marinos	1-0	JEF United Ichihara	International Stadium Yokohama
JST (UTC+09)

18 November 2000 2-13	Cerezo Osaka	1-2	Yokohama F. Marinos	Osaka Nagai Stadium
JST (UTC+09)

23 November 2000 2-14	Kawasaki Frontale	1-0 (GG) (a.e.t.)	Yokohama F. Marinos	Todoroki Athletics Stadium
JST (UTC+09)

26 November 2000 2-15	Yokohama F. Marinos	2-1 (GG) (a.e.t.)	Avispa Fukuoka	International Stadium Yokohama
JST (UTC+09)

=== Emperor's Cup ===
1st Round	bye

2nd Round	bye

13 December 2000 3rd Round	Yokohama F. Marinos	2-0	Fukuoka University	Yokohama Mitsuzawa Stadium
JST (UTC+09)

17 December 2000 4th Round	Yokohama F. Marinos	2-1 (GG) (a.e.t.)	Consadole Sapporo	Ehime Matsuyama Athletic Stadium
JST (UTC+09)

23 December 2000 Quarterfinals	Yokohama F. Marinos	1-1 (GG) (a.e.t.) (1-4 p)	Kashima Antlers	Tottori Soccer Stadium
JST (UTC+09)

=== J.League Cup ===
12 April 2000 1st Round-1	Ventforet Kofu	0-2	Yokohama F. Marinos	Kose Sports Park Stadium
JST (UTC+09)

19 April 2000 1st Round-2	Yokohama F. Marinos	5-1 (7-1 agg.)	Ventforet Kofu	Yokohama Mitsuzawa Stadium
JST (UTC+09)

28 June 2000 2nd Round-1	Yokohama F. Marinos	4-1	Sanfrecce Hiroshima	Yokohama Mitsuzawa Stadium
JST (UTC+09)

5 July 2000 2nd Round-2	Sanfrecce Hiroshima	1-0 (2-4 agg.)	Yokohama F. Marinos	Hiroshima Stadium
JST (UTC+09)

30 August 2000 Quarterfinals-1	Yokohama F. Marinos	1-2	Kashima Antlers	Yamagata Park Stadium
JST (UTC+09)

6 September 2000 Quarterfinals-2	Kashima Antlers	1-1 (3-2 agg.)	Yokohama F. Marinos	Kashima Soccer Stadium
JST (UTC+09)

== Player statistics ==
No.	Pos.	Nat.	Player	D.o.B. (Age)	Height / Weight	J.League 1		Emperor's Cup		J.League Cup		Total	
No.	Pos.	Nat.	Player	D.o.B. (Age)	Height / Weight	Apps	Goals	Apps	Goals	Apps	Goals	Apps	Goals
1	GK	(Japan)	Yoshikatsu Kawaguchi	August 15, 1975 (aged 24)	cm / kg	28	0						
2	DF	(Japan)	Jun Ideguchi	May 14, 1979 (aged 20)	cm / kg	0	0						
3	DF	(Japan)	Naoki Matsuda	March 14, 1977 (aged 22)	cm / kg	24	2						
4	DF	(Japan)	Yasuhiro Hato	May 4, 1976 (aged 23)	cm / kg	26	0						
5	DF	(Japan)	Norio Omura	September 6, 1969 (aged 30)	cm / kg	30	2						
6	MF	(Japan)	Yoshiharu Ueno	April 21, 1973 (aged 26)	cm / kg	23	1						
7	MF	(Japan)	Hideki Nagai	January 26, 1971 (aged 29)	cm / kg	21	0						
8	MF	(South Korea)	Yoo Sang-Chul	October 18, 1971 (aged 28)	cm / kg	22	17						
9	MF	(Japan)	Atsuhiro Miura	July 24, 1974 (aged 25)	cm / kg	26	5						
10	MF	(Japan)	Shunsuke Nakamura	June 24, 1978 (aged 21)	cm / kg	30	5						
11	FW	(Japan)	Takayuki Yoshida	March 14, 1977 (aged 22)	cm / kg	7	1						
12	FW	(Argentina)	Raul Maldonado	March 11, 1975 (aged 25)	cm / kg	4	0						
12	DF	(Japan)	Masahiro Ando	April 2, 1972 (aged 27)	cm / kg	7	0						
13	MF	(Japan)	Kunio Nagayama	September 16, 1970 (aged 29)	cm / kg	24	2						
14	MF	(Japan)	Seiji Koga	August 7, 1979 (aged 20)	cm / kg	0	0						
15	MF	(Japan)	Kazuhiro Murakami	January 20, 1981 (aged 19)	cm / kg	0	0						
16	GK	(Japan)	Tatsuya Enomoto	March 16, 1979 (aged 20)	cm / kg	3	0						
17	FW	(Japan)	Ryosuke Kijima	May 29, 1979 (aged 20)	cm / kg	5	0						
18	MF	(Japan)	Akihiro Endō	September 18, 1975 (aged 24)	cm / kg	29	3						
19	MF	(Japan)	Daisuke Tonoike	January 29, 1975 (aged 25)	cm / kg	25	8						
20	DF	(Japan)	Kazunari Okayama	April 24, 1978 (aged 21)	cm / kg	13	0						
21	GK	(Japan)	Hideaki Ozawa	March 17, 1974 (aged 25)	cm / kg	0	0						
22	GK	(Japan)	Go Kaburaki	August 26, 1977 (aged 22)	cm / kg	0	0						
23	FW	(Japan)	Yoichi Mori	August 1, 1980 (aged 19)	cm / kg	2	0						
24	MF	(Japan)	Shintaro Harada	November 8, 1980 (aged 19)	cm / kg	16	1						
25	DF	(Japan)	Yohei Kurakawa	August 10, 1977 (aged 22)	cm / kg	0	0						
26	FW	(Japan)	Masayuki Onishi	July 5, 1977 (aged 22)	cm / kg	0	0						
27	MF	(Japan)	Masahiro Ōhashi	June 23, 1981 (aged 18)	cm / kg	1	0						
28	MF	(Japan)	Naohiro Ishikawa	May 12, 1981 (aged 18)	cm / kg	2	0						
29	MF	(Japan)	Masahiro Fukazawa	July 12, 1977 (aged 22)	cm / kg	0	0						
30	FW	(Morocco)	Abdeljalil Hadda	March 21, 1972 (aged 27)	cm / kg	0	0						
30	FW	(Brazil)	Edmílson Matias	March 26, 1974 (aged 25)	cm / kg	23	7						
31	DF	(Croatia)	Goran Jurić	February 5, 1963 (aged 37)	cm / kg	9	0						
31	FW	(Japan)	Shoji Jo	June 17, 1975 (aged 24)	cm / kg	4	2						
32	DF	(Japan)	Hayuma Tanaka	July 31, 1982 (aged 17)	cm / kg	0	0						
34	MF	(Japan)	Yuki Kaneko	May 29, 1982 (aged 17)	cm / kg	3	0						
37	FW	(South Korea)	Shin Byung-Ho	April 26, 1977 (aged 22)	cm / kg	0	0						

== Other pages ==
- (in Japanese) J.League official site
