= Koji Kobayashi (engineer) =

Koji Kobayashi (February 17, 1907 – November 30, 1996) was a Japanese engineer and businessman known for his contributions to the electronics industry. He served as the president of NEC from 1964 until 1976 and then as chairman until 1988.

== Early life and education ==
Koji Kobayashi was born on February 17, 1907, in Hatsukari, a village in Yamanashi Prefecture. He was the fourth boy among nine children. Despite the remote location of his village and the distance to the nearest middle school, Kobayashi was a dedicated student who excelled academically. His academic performance earned him a scholarship, and with the financial support of his brothers, he was able to attend Matsumoto High School. During this period, he received the Nomura Fellowship from the Nomura Foundation.

Kobayashi graduated from the Department of Electrical Engineering of Tokyo Imperial University in March 1929 with a Bachelor of Engineering degree. Ten years later, he was awarded a Doctor of Engineering degree for his research on feedback amplifiers.

== Death ==
Kobayashi died on 30 November 1996. His death was reportedly caused by hemorrhaging of the digestive tract.
