= Yasuhiro Higuchi =

Japanese footballer and manager

Yasuhiro Higuchi 樋口 靖洋
Personal information
- Date of birth: May 5, 1961 (age 65)
- Place of birth: Mie, Japan

Youth career
- 1977–1979: Yokkaichi Chuo Technical High School

Senior career*
Years	Team	Apps	(Gls)
1980–1984	Nissan Motors		

Managerial career
- 2006–2007: Montedio Yamagata
- 2008: Omiya Ardija
- 2009: Yokohama FC
- 2012–2014: Yokohama F. Marinos
- 2015: Ventforet Kofu
- 2016–2018: YSCC Yokohama
- 2019–2021: FC Ryukyu
- 2022-: Veertien Mie
Medal record
Nissan Motors
Runner-up	Japan Soccer League	1983
Runner-up	Japan Soccer League	1984
Runner-up	JSL Cup	1983
Winner	Emperor's Cup	1983
- * Club domestic league appearances and goals

Yasuhiro Higuchi (樋口 靖洋, Higuchi Yasuhiro; born May 5, 1961) is a Japanese football manager and former player who manages Veertien Mie.

== Playing career ==
Higuchi was born in Mie Prefecture on May 5, 1961. After graduating from high school, he played for Nissan Motors from 1980 to 1984.

== Coaching career ==
After retirement, Higuchi started coaching career at Nissan Motors (later Yokohama F. Marinos) from 1985 and mainly coached youth team (1993–1998) and top team (1999–2005). In 2006, he moved to J2 League club Montedio Yamagata and became a manager for top team first time in his career. In 2008, he moved to J1 League club Omiya Ardija. Although he managed in J1 League in his career, he resigned in a year. In 2009, he signed with J2 club Yokohama FC. However he resigned for poor performance in a year. In 2010, he returned to Yokohama F. Marinos and served as an assistant coach under manager Kazushi Kimura. In 2012, Higuchi became a manager as Kimura successor. In 2013 J1 season, although the club was the top place until late, the club lost the last two matches and missed the league champions. In 2013 Emperor's Cup, the club won the champions defeated league champions Sanfrecce Hiroshima. He managed Marinos until end of 2014 season and moved to Ventforet Kofu in 2015. However the club results were bad and he resigned in May when the club at the bottom place. In 2016, he signed with J3 League club YSCC Yokohama which was the bottom place for the 2nd consecutive year in J3 until 2015. Although the club was bottom place in 2016, the club left the bottom place first time in 2017. He managed the club until end of 2018 season. He signed with J2 club FC Ryukyu in 2019 season.

== Managerial statistics ==
Update; Games managed up to December 31, 2020

Team	From	To	Record				
Team	From	To	G	W	D	L	Win %
Montedio Yamagata	2006	2007	96	32	27	37	33.33
Omiya Ardija	2008	2008	34	12	7	15	35.29
Yokohama FC	2009	2009	51	11	11	29	21.57
Yokohama F. Marinos	2012	2014	102	45	31	26	44.12
Ventforet Kofu	2015	2015	11	2	0	9	18.18
YSCC Yokohama	2016	2018	94	21	23	50	22.34
FC Ryukyu	2019	2021	84	27	18	39	32.14
Veertien Mie	2022	present	0	0	0	0	—
Total			472	150	117	205	31.78

== Honours ==
Yokohama F. Marinos

- Emperor's Cup: 2013
