= Souza =

Souza may refer to:

- Souza, a variant of the surname Sousa, including a list of people with the name
- Souza (footballer, born 1975), José Ivanaldo de Souza, Brazilian football attacking midfielder
- Souza (footballer, born 1977), Sergio Roberto Pereira de Souza, Brazilian football midfielder
- Souza (footballer, born 1979), Willamis de Souza Silva, Brazilian former football midfielder and television pundit
- Souza (footballer, born 1982), Rodrigo de Souza Cardoso, Brazilian football striker
- Souza (footballer, born 1988), Elierce Barbosa de Souza, Brazilian football defensive midfielder
- Souza (footballer, born 2006), João Victor de Souza Menezes, Brazilian football left-back

== See also ==
- Sousa (disambiguation)
