= Kokichi Kimura =

Japanese footballer and manager

Kokichi Kimura 木村 浩吉
Personal information
- Full name: Kokichi Kimura
- Date of birth: July 12, 1961 (age 65)
- Place of birth: Aichi, Japan
- Height: 1.67 m (5 ft 5 1/2 in)
- Position: Forward

Senior career*
Years	Team	Apps	(Gls)
1985–1991	Nissan Motors	54	(8)
Total		54	(8)

Managerial career
- 2008–2009: Yokohama F. Marinos
- 2012–2014: Laos
Medal record
Nissan Motors
Winner	Japan Soccer League	1988/89
Winner	Japan Soccer League	1989/90
Runner-up	Japan Soccer League	1990/91
Winner	JSL Cup	1988
Winner	JSL Cup	1989
Winner	JSL Cup	1990
Runner-up	JSL Cup	1985
Runner-up	JSL Cup	1986
Winner	Emperor's Cup	1985
Winner	Emperor's Cup	1988
Winner	Emperor's Cup	1989
Runner-up	Emperor's Cup	1990
- * Club domestic league appearances and goals

Kokichi Kimura (木村 浩吉, Kimura Kōkichi; born July 12, 1961) is a former Japanese football player and manager.

== Playing career ==
Kimura was born in Aichi Prefecture on July 12, 1961. He played for Nissan Motors from 1985 to 1991.

== Coaching career ==
After retirement, Kimura became a coach at Nissan Motors (later Yokohama F. Marinos) in 1991. In July 2008, he became a manager and managed until 2009. In 2012, he became a manager for Laos national team.

== Managerial statistics ==
Team	From	To	Record				
Team	From	To	G	W	D	L	Win %
Yokohama F. Marinos	2008	2009	52	19	19	14	36.54
Total			52	19	19	14	36.54
