= Toru Yoshikawa =

Japanese footballer

Toru Yoshikawa 吉川 亨
Personal information
- Full name: Toru Yoshikawa
- Date of birth: December 13, 1961 (age 64)
- Place of birth: Mie, Japan
- Height: 1.72 m (5 ft 7 1/2 in)
- Position: Midfielder

Youth career
- 1977–1979: Yokkaichi Chuo Technical High School

Senior career*
Years	Team	Apps	(Gls)
1980–1992	Hitachi		
1992–1994	Kyoto Purple Sanga		
1995–2000	FC Kyoken		

International career
1983	Japan	1	(0)
Medal record
Hitachi
Runner-up	Japan Soccer League	1982
Runner-up	JSL Cup	1980
- * Club domestic league appearances and goals

Toru Yoshikawa (吉川 亨, Yoshikawa Tōru; born December 13, 1961) is a former Japanese football player. He played for Japan national team.

== Club career ==
Yoshikawa was born in Mie Prefecture on December 13, 1961. After graduating from high school, he joined Hitachi in 1980. In 1992, he moved to Kyoto Shiko (later Kyoto Purple Sanga). In 1995, he moved to Kyoiku Kenkyusya (later FC Kyoken). He retired in 2000.

== National team career ==
On February 12, 1983, Yoshikawa debuted for Japan national team against Syria.

== National team statistics ==
Japan national team
Year	Apps	Goals
1983	1	0
Total	1	0
