= Raul Maldonado =

Argentine footballer

Personal information
- Full name: Raul Horácio Maldonado
- Date of birth: March 11, 1975 (age 51)
- Place of birth: Córdoba, Argentina
- Height: 1.83 m (6 ft 0 in)
- Position: Forward

Senior career*
Years	Team	Apps	(Gls)
2000	Yokohama F. Marinos	4	(0)
- * Club domestic league appearances and goals

Raul Horácio Maldonado (born March 11, 1975) is a former Argentine football player and a manager.

== Club statistics ==
Club performance			League		Cup		League Cup		Total	
Season	Club	League	Apps	Goals	Apps	Goals	Apps	Goals	Apps	Goals
Japan			League		Emperor's Cup		J.League Cup		Total	
2000	Yokohama F. Marinos	J1 League	4	0	0	0	1	0	5	0
Total			4	0	0	0	1	0	5	0
