= Yuki Kaneko (footballer, born 1982) =

Japanese footballer

Yuki Kaneko 金子 勇樹
Personal information
- Full name: Yuki Kaneko
- Date of birth: May 29, 1982 (age 44)
- Place of birth: Ota, Tokyo, Japan
- Height: 1.68 m (5 ft 6 in)
- Position: Midfielder

Youth career
- 1998–2000: Yokohama F. Marinos

Senior career*
Years	Team	Apps	(Gls)
2000–2004	Yokohama F. Marinos	13	(0)
2004–2007	Consadole Sapporo	61	(1)
Total		74	(1)
Medal record
Yokohama F. Marinos
Winner	J1 League	2003
Winner	J1 League	2004
Runner-up	J1 League	2000
Runner-up	J1 League	2002
Winner	J.League Cup	2001
- * Club domestic league appearances and goals

Yuki Kaneko (金子 勇樹, Kaneko Yūki; born May 29, 1982) is a former Japanese football player.

== Playing career ==
Kaneko was born in Ota, Tokyo on May 29, 1982. He joined J1 League club Yokohama F. Marinos from youth team in 2000. He debuted in November 2000 and his opportunity to play increased in 2001. However he could hardly play in the match from 2002. In August 2004, he moved to J2 League club Consadole Sapporo. He became a regular player as defensive midfielder in summer 2005. However his opportunity to play decreased from 2006 and he retired end of 2007 season.

== Club statistics ==
Club performance			League		Cup		League Cup		Continental		Total	
Season	Club	League	Apps	Goals	Apps	Goals	Apps	Goals	Apps	Goals	Apps	Goals
Japan			League		Emperor's Cup		J.League Cup		Asia		Total	
2000	Yokohama F. Marinos	J1 League	3	0	1	0	0	0	-		4	0
2001	Yokohama F. Marinos	J1 League	8	0	0	0	4	0	-		12	0
2002	Yokohama F. Marinos	J1 League	1	0	0	0	4	0	-		5	0
2003	Yokohama F. Marinos	J1 League	1	0	2	0	2	0	-		5	0
2004	Yokohama F. Marinos	J1 League	0	0	0	0	1	0	1	0	2	0
2004	Consadole Sapporo	J2 League	8	1	3	0	-		-		11	1
2005	Consadole Sapporo	J2 League	27	0	1	0	-		-		28	0
2006	Consadole Sapporo	J2 League	19	0	4	0	-		-		23	0
2007	Consadole Sapporo	J2 League	7	0	1	0	-		-		8	0
Career total			74	1	12	0	11	0	1	0	98	1
