= Hideki Matsunaga =

Japanese footballer and manager

Hideki Matsunaga 松永 英機
Personal information
- Full name: Hideki Matsunaga
- Date of birth: February 8, 1963 (age 63)
- Place of birth: Fujieda, Shizuoka, Japan
- Height: 1.69 m (5 ft 6 1/2 in)
- Position: Defender

Youth career
- 1978–1980: Shizuoka Gakuen High School

College career
| Years | Team | Apps | (Gls) |
| 1981–1984 | Osaka University of Commerce | | |

Senior career*
| Years | Team | Apps | (Gls) |
| 1984–1991 | Matsushita Electric | | |

Managerial career
- 1999: Verdy Kawasaki
- 2003–2004: Ventforet Kofu
- 2005: Vissel Kobe
- 2006: Sagawa Printing
- 2007–2009: FC Gifu
- 2021: Yokohama F. Marinos (caretaker)
Medal record
Matsushita Electric
| Winner | Emperor's Cup | 1990 |
- * Club domestic league appearances and goals

Hideki Matsunaga (松永 英機, Matsunaga Hideki; born February 8, 1963) is a former Japanese football player and manager.

== Playing career ==
Matsunaga was born in Fujieda on February 8, 1963. After graduating from Osaka University of Commerce, he played for Matsushita Electric from 1984 to 1991. The club became the champions of the 1990 Emperor's Cup which was the first major title in the club's history.

== Coaching career ==
When Matsunaga was a player for Matsushita Electric (later Gamba Osaka), he became a coach at the club in 1989. He coached for the club until 1994. In 1997, Matsunaga signed with Verdy Kawasaki and in 1999 he became a manager. From 2003, he managed Ventforet Kofu (2003-2004), Vissel Kobe (2005), Sagawa Printing (2006) and FC Gifu (2007-2009).

== Managerial statistics ==
| Team | From | To | Record | | | | |
| Team | From | To | G | W | D | L | Win % |
|---|---|---|---|---|---|---|---|
| Verdy Kawasaki | January 1999 | December 1999 | 30 | 17 | 2 | 11 | 56.67 |
| Ventforet Kofu | January 2003 | December 2004 | 88 | 34 | 25 | 29 | 38.64 |
| Vissel Kobe | January 2005 | April 2005 | 6 | 1 | 2 | 3 | 16.67 |
| Sagawa Printing | January 2006 | August 2006 | 24 | 5 | 6 | 13 | 20.83 |
| FC Gifu | June 2007 | December 2009 | 111 | 33 | 32 | 46 | 29.73 |
| Yokohama F. Marinos | June 2021 | July 2021 | 5 | 4 | 0 | 1 | 80.00 |
| Total | | | 264 | 94 | 67 | 103 | 35.61 |
