= Souza (footballer, born 1977) =

Brazilian footballer

Personal information
- Full name: Sergio Roberto Pereira de Souza
- Date of birth: May 29, 1977 (age 49)
- Place of birth: Brazil
- Height: 1.78 m (5 ft 10 in)
- Position: Midfielder

Senior career*
Years	Team	Apps	(Gls)
1993–1994	Dom Bosco		
1995	Flamengo		
1996	Botafogo		
1996	Ceres		
1997	Sao Cristovao		
1998	Barra Tijuca		
1999	Tombense		
2000	Sta. Maria		
2001	Albirex Niigata		
- * Club domestic league appearances and goals

Sergio Roberto Pereira de Souza (born May 29, 1977) is a Brazilian football player.
