= Matsumoto Agatagaoka High School =

- 長野県松本県ヶ丘高等学校
- Matsumoto Agatagaoka High logo

Location
- Matsumoto, Nagano; Japan
- Coordinates: 36.232194°N 137.9854°E

Information
- Type: Public secondary
- Established: 1923
- Website: Official website

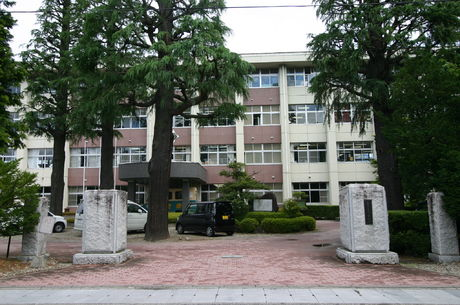
Matsumoto Agatagaoka High School

Matsumoto Agatagaoka High School (松本県ヶ丘高等学校, Matsumoto Agatagaoka Koutou Gakkou) is a senior high school in Matsumoto, Nagano Prefecture, Japan. The school is located in Agata 2 Chome.

== History ==
Matsumoto Agatagaoka High School was first opened as Nagano Prefectural Matsumoto No. 2 Junior High on 17, April, 1923. On 1, April, 1948 it was renamed Nagano Prefectural Matsumoto Agatagaoka High School. The school's name comes from its location in Agata.

The high school offers both a general course and an English course. In 1994, the English program was established. The general education course accepts 280 students per year while the English course accepts 40. There have been more than 27 thousand graduates since the founding of the school.

The common name for the school is Kenryo (縣陵), and the school festival is called Kenryosai (縣陵祭).

== School symbols ==
The four points of the school symbol represent the Japanese Alps. It was designed by a high school staff member in 1923. The current design was revised in 1948.

=== School song ===
The school has had four songs. The current song is Wakaki Warera (若き我等). The music is by Kiyoshi Nobutoki, with lyrics by Tatsuyuki Takano.

== Academics ==
About 140 to 150 students are accepted to national and public universities in Japan each year. Among them, about 50 are accepted to Shinshu University. There are successful applicants to Hokkaido University, Tohoku University, Nagoya University, and Osaka University every year. Students have also been accepted to Kyoto University and Tokyo University. About 150 students are accepted to private universities such as Waseda University, Keiou University, Jochi University, Meiji University, Rikkyo University, and Hosei University every year.

== Students ==
=== Clubs ===
The school hosts a number of clubs, split between sports and cultural clubs. In 2015, sports clubs had a participation rate of 56.1% and the cultural clubs had a rate of 45.4%.

==== Sports clubs ====
The school offers boys' soccer, boys' and girls' volleyball, boys' and girls' basketball, boys' and girls' tennis (regulation and soft), boys' and girls' badminton, table tennis, baseball, kendo, track and field, swimming, mountaineering, karate, and Japanese archery (弓道, kydou).

==== Cultural clubs ====
Clubs include brass band, music (chorus), light music, drama, art, newspaper, pictures, physics, Earth science, creature, home economics, dance, English (debate), literature, tea ceremony, calligraphy, shogi, comic, volunteer, digital art, card, and Japanese flower arrangement (生け花, ikebana).

=== School festival ===
The school festival's name is Kenryosai (縣陵祭). During that time, students enjoy eating foods, listening to announcements from the cultural clubs, and participate in the relay.

=== Walking competition ===
The competition is held in October. Boys walk 32 kilometers while girls walk 28.

=== Notable alumni ===
Many famous people have graduated from Matsumoto Agatagaoka High School, including lawyers, university professors, athletes, singers, and actors. These include film director Takashi Yamazaki, who directed Always: Sunset on Third Street and Eternal Zero.
