= Japan national football team results (1980–1989) =

This article lists the results for the Japan national football team between 1980 and 1989.

== 1980 ==
Date	Opponent	Result	Score	Venue	Competition
22 March 1980	South Korea	L	1–3	Kuala Lumpur, Malaysia	1980 Olympic Games Qualification
24 March 1980	Philippines	W	10–0	Kuala Lumpur, Malaysia	1980 Olympic Games Qualification
28 March 1980	Indonesia	W	2–0	Kuala Lumpur, Malaysia	1980 Olympic Games Qualification
30 March 1980	Malaysia	D	1–1	Kuala Lumpur, Malaysia	1980 Olympic Games Qualification
2 April 1980	Brunei	W	2–1	Kuala Lumpur, Malaysia	1980 Olympic Games Qualification
9 June 1980	Hong Kong	W	3–1	Guangzhou, China	Guangzhou International Football Tournament
11 June 1980	China	L	0–1	Guangzhou, China	Guangzhou International Football Tournament
18 June 1980	Hong Kong	W	2–0	Guangzhou, China	Guangzhou International Football Tournament
22 December 1980	Singapore	W	1–0	Hong Kong	1982 FIFA World Cup qualification (AFC and OFC)
26 December 1980	China	L	0–1	Hong Kong	1982 FIFA World Cup qualification (AFC and OFC)
28 December 1980	Macau	W	3–0	Hong Kong	1982 FIFA World Cup qualification (AFC and OFC)
30 December 1980	North Korea	L	0–1	Hong Kong	1982 FIFA World Cup qualification (AFC and OFC)

== 1981 ==
Date	Opponent	Result	Score	Venue	Competition
8 February 1981	Malaysia	L	0–1	Kuantan, Malaysia	International Friendly
10 February 1981	Malaysia	D	1–1	Kuala Lumpur, Malaysia	International Friendly
17 February 1981	Singapore	W	1–0	Singapore	International Friendly
19 February 1981	Singapore	D	1–1	Singapore	International Friendly
24 February 1981	Indonesia	L	0–2	Jakarta, Indonesia	International Friendly
8 March 1981	South Korea	L	0–1	Tokyo National Stadium, Tokyo, Japan	International Friendly
2 June 1981	China	D	0–0	Ōmiya Park Soccer Stadium, Saitama, Japan	Kirin Cup
19 June 1981	Malaysia	W	2–0	Daegu, South Korea	International Friendly
21 June 1981	South Korea	L	0–2	Busan, South Korea	International Friendly
30 August 1981	Malaysia	W	2–0	Kuala Lumpur, Malaysia	Merdeka Tournament
3 September 1981	India	W	3–2	Kuala Lumpur, Malaysia	Merdeka Tournament
8 September 1981	United Arab Emirates	W	3–2	Kuala Lumpur, Malaysia	Merdeka Tournament
14 September 1981	Indonesia	W	2–0	Kuala Lumpur, Malaysia	Merdeka Tournament
18 September 1981	Iraq	L	0–2	Kuala Lumpur, Malaysia	Merdeka Tournament

== 1982 ==
Date	Opponent	Result	Score	Venue	Competition
21 March 1982	South Korea	L	0–3	Seoul, South Korea	International Friendly
2 June 1982	Singapore	W	2–0	Coca-Cola West Hiroshima Stadium, Hiroshima, Japan	International Friendly
15 July 1982	Romania	L	0–4	Suceava, Romania	International Friendly
18 July 1982	Romania	L	1–3	Bucharest, Romania	International Friendly
21 November 1982	Iran	W	1–0	New Delhi, India	1982 Asian Games Football
23 November 1982	South Yemen	W	3–1	New Delhi, India	1982 Asian Games Football
25 November 1982	South Korea	W	2–1	New Delhi, India	1982 Asian Games Football
28 November 1982	Iraq	L	0–1	New Delhi, India	1982 Asian Games Football

== 1983 ==
Date	Opponent	Result	Score	Venue	Competition
12 February 1983	Syria	D	2–2	Damascus, Syria	International Friendly
20 February 1983	Egypt Olympic Team	D	0–0^{1}	Mahara, Egypt	International Friendly
22 February 1983	Egypt Olympic Team	D	0–0^{1}	Mahara, Egypt	International Friendly
25 February 1983	Qatar	L	0–1	Doha, Qatar	International Friendly
6 March 1983	South Korea	D	1–1	Tokyo National Stadium, Tokyo, Japan	International Friendly
7 June 1983	Syria	W	1–0	Tokyo National Stadium, Tokyo, Japan	Kirin Cup
4 September 1983	Philippines	W	7–0^{1}	Tokyo National Stadium, Tokyo, Japan	1984 Olympic Games Qualification
7 September 1983	Philippines	W	10–1^{1}	Tokyo National Stadium, Tokyo, Japan	1984 Olympic Games Qualification
15 September 1983	Chinese Taipei	W	2–0^{1}	Tokyo National Stadium, Tokyo, Japan	1984 Olympic Games Qualification
20 September 1983	Chinese Taipei	D	1–1^{1}	(Taiwan) Taipei, Republic of China	1984 Olympic Games Qualification
25 September 1983	New Zealand	L	1–3^{1}	Auckland, New Zealand	1984 Olympic Games Qualification
7 October 1983	New Zealand	L	0–1^{1}	Tokyo National Stadium, Tokyo, Japan	1984 Olympic Games Qualification
1:Not recognized by FIFA.

== 1984 ==
Date	Opponent	Result	Score	Venue	Competition
6 March 1984	Brunei	W	7–1	Bandar Seri Begawan, Brunei	International Friendly
15 April 1984	Thailand	L	2–5^{1}	Singapore	1984 Olympic Games Qualification
18 April 1984	Malaysia	L	1–2^{1}	Singapore	1984 Olympic Games Qualification
21 April 1984	Iraq	L	1–2^{1}	Singapore	1984 Olympic Games Qualification
26 April 1984	Qatar	L	1–2^{1}	Singapore	1984 Olympic Games Qualification
31 May 1984	China	W	1–0^{1}	Ōmiya Park Soccer Stadium, Saitama, Japan	Kirin Cup
30 September 1984	South Korea	W	2–1	Seoul, South Korea	International Friendly
1:Not recognized by FIFA.

== 1985 ==
Date	Opponent	Result	Score	Venue	Competition
23 February 1985	Singapore	W	3–1	Singapore	1986 FIFA World Cup qualification (AFC)
21 March 1985	North Korea	W	1–0	Tokyo National Stadium, Tokyo, Japan	1986 FIFA World Cup qualification (AFC)
30 April 1985	North Korea	D	0–0	Pyongyang, North Korea	1986 FIFA World Cup qualification (AFC)
18 May 1985	Singapore	W	5–0	Tokyo National Stadium, Tokyo, Japan	1986 FIFA World Cup qualification (AFC)
26 May 1985	Uruguay	L	1–4	Tokyo National Stadium, Tokyo, Japan	Kirin Cup
4 June 1985	Malaysia	W	3–0^{1}	Mizuho Athletic Stadium, Nagoya, Japan	Kirin Cup
11 August 1985	Hong Kong	W	3–0	Kobe Universiade Memorial Stadium, Kobe, Japan	1986 FIFA World Cup qualification (AFC)
22 September 1985	Hong Kong	W	2–1	Hong Kong	1986 FIFA World Cup qualification (AFC)
26 October 1985	South Korea	L	1–2	Tokyo National Stadium, Tokyo, Japan	1986 FIFA World Cup qualification (AFC)
3 November 1985	South Korea	L	0–1	Seoul, South Korea	1986 FIFA World Cup qualification (AFC)
1:Not recognized by FIFA.

== 1986 ==
Date	Opponent	Result	Score	Venue	Competition
25 July 1986	Syria	W	2–1^{1}	Kuala Lumpur, Malaysia	Merdeka Tournament
1 August 1986	Malaysia	L	1–2^{1}	Kuala Lumpur, Malaysia	Merdeka Tournament
20 September 1986	Nepal	W	5–0	Daejeon, South Korea	1986 Asian Games Football
22 September 1986	Iran	L	0–2	Daejeon, South Korea	1986 Asian Games Football
24 September 1986	Kuwait	L	0–2	Daejeon, South Korea	1986 Asian Games Football
28 September 1986	Bangladesh	W	4–0	Daejeon, South Korea	1986 Asian Games Football
1:Not recognized by FIFA.

== 1987 ==
Date	Opponent	Result	Score	Venue	Competition
8 April 1987	Indonesia	W	3–0^{1}	Tokyo National Stadium, Tokyo, Japan	1988 Olympic Games Qualification
12 April 1987	Singapore	W	1–0^{1}	Tokyo National Stadium, Tokyo, Japan	1988 Olympic Games Qualification
27 May 1987	Senegal	D	2–2	Coca-Cola West Hiroshima Stadium, Hiroshima, Japan	Kirin Cup
14 June 1987	Singapore	W	1–0^{1}	Singapore	1988 Olympic Games Qualification
26 June 1987	Indonesia	W	2–1^{1}	Jakarta, Indonesia	1988 Olympic Games Qualification
2 September 1987	Thailand	D	0–0^{1}	Bangkok, Thailand	1988 Olympic Games Qualification
15 September 1987	Nepal	W	5–0^{1}	Tokyo National Stadium, Tokyo, Japan	1988 Olympic Games Qualification
18 September 1987	Nepal	W	9–0^{1}	Tokyo National Stadium, Tokyo, Japan	1988 Olympic Games Qualification
26 September 1987	Thailand	W	1–0^{1}	Tokyo National Stadium, Tokyo, Japan	1988 Olympic Games Qualification
4 October 1987	China	W	1–0^{1}	Guangzhou, China	1988 Olympic Games Qualification
26 October 1987	China	L	0–2^{1}	Tokyo National Stadium, Tokyo, Japan	1988 Olympic Games Qualification
1:Not recognized by FIFA.

== 1988 ==
Date	Opponent	Result	Score	Venue	Competition
27 January 1988	United Arab Emirates	D	1–1	Dubai, United Arab Emirates	International Friendly
30 January 1988	United Arab Emirates	L	0–2	Abu Dhabi, United Arab Emirates	International Friendly
2 February 1988	Oman	D	1–1	Muscat, Oman	International Friendly
8 April 1988	Kuwait	L	0–1	Kuala Lumpur, Malaysia	1988 AFC Asian Cup qualification
11 April 1988	Malaysia	W	1–0	Kuala Lumpur, Malaysia	1988 AFC Asian Cup qualification
16 April 1988	Jordan	D	1–1	Kuala Lumpur, Malaysia	1988 AFC Asian Cup qualification
8 April 1988	Pakistan	W	4–1	Kuala Lumpur, Malaysia	1988 AFC Asian Cup qualification
2 June 1988	China	L	0–3	Mizuho Athletic Stadium, Nagoya, Japan	Kirin Cup
9 July 1988	Turkey Olympic Team	L	0–3^{1}	Istanbul, Turkey	International Friendly
26 October 1988	South Korea	L	0–1	Tokyo National Stadium, Tokyo, Japan	International Friendly
4 December 1988	Iran	D	0–0	Qatar SC Stadium, Doha, Qatar	1988 AFC Asian Cup
6 December 1988	South Korea	L	0–2	Qatar SC Stadium, Doha, Qatar	1988 AFC Asian Cup
10 December 1988	United Arab Emirates	L	0–1	Al-Ahly Stadium, Doha, Qatar	1988 AFC Asian Cup
12 December 1988	Qatar	L	0–3	Al-Ahly Stadium, Doha, Qatar	1988 AFC Asian Cup
1:Not recognized by FIFA.

== 1989 ==
Date	Opponent	Result	Score	Venue	Competition
20 January 1989	Iran	D	2–2	Tehran, Iran	International Friendly
5 May 1989	South Korea	L	0–1	Seoul, South Korea	International Friendly
10 May 1989	China	D	2–2	Nishigaoka Soccer Stadium, Tokyo, Japan	International Friendly
13 May 1989	China	W	2–0	Kanko Stadium, Okayama, Japan	International Friendly
22 May 1989	Hong Kong	D	0–0	Hong Kong	1990 FIFA World Cup qualification (AFC)
28 May 1989	Indonesia	D	0–0	Jakarta, Indonesia	1990 FIFA World Cup qualification (AFC)
4 June 1989	North Korea	W	2–1	Tokyo National Stadium, Tokyo, Japan	1990 FIFA World Cup qualification (AFC)
11 June 1989	Indonesia	W	5–0	Nishigaoka Soccer Stadium, Tokyo, Japan	1990 FIFA World Cup qualification (AFC)
18 June 1989	Hong Kong	D	0–0	Kobe Universiade Memorial Stadium, Kobe, Japan	1990 FIFA World Cup qualification (AFC)
25 June 1989	North Korea	L	0–2	Pyongyang, North Korea	1990 FIFA World Cup qualification (AFC)
23 July 1989	Brazil	L	0–1	Rio de Janeiro, Brazil	International Friendly
