= 1985 Emperor's Cup =

Tournament details
- Country: Japan

Final positions
- Champions: Nissan Motors
- Runners-up: Fujita Industries
- Semifinalists: Toyota Motors; Mazda

Statistics of Emperor's Cup in the 1985 season.

== Overview ==
It was contested by 32 teams, and Nissan Motors won the championship.

== Results ==
=== 1st round ===
- Fujita Industries 2–1 Osaka University of Health and Sport Sciences
- Tanabe Pharmaceuticals 3–1 Teijin
- Yanmar Diesel 3–0 Cosmo Oil
- Matsushita Electric 2–3 Mitsubishi Motors
- Yamaha Motors 2–0 Chuo University
- Nissei Resin 1–3 All Nippon Airways
- Kokushikan University 2–3 Toyota Motors
- Toshiba 1–2 Honda
- Nippon Kokan 3–0 Tsukuba University
- Sapporo University 0–2 Toho Titanium
- Hitachi 6–0 Fukushima
- Niigata Eleven 0–6 Nissan Motors
- Yomiuri 3–0 Seino Transportation
- Mazda 1–0 Sumitomo Metals
- Doshisha University 0–2 Yawata Steel
- Mitsubishi Chemical Kurosaki 0–9 Furukawa Electric

=== 2nd round ===
- Fujita Industries 1–0 Tanabe Pharmaceuticals
- Yanmar Diesel 0–1 Mitsubishi Motors
- Yamaha Motors 1–0 All Nippon Airways
- Toyota Motors 2–1 Honda
- Nippon Kokan 3–1 Toho Titanium
- Hitachi 1–2 Nissan Motors
- Yomiuri 0–1 Mazda
- Yawata Steel 0–2 Furukawa Electric

=== Quarterfinals ===
- Fujita Industries 2–0 Mitsubishi Motors
- Yamaha Motors 1–2 Toyota Motors
- Nippon Kokan 2–2 (PK 2–3) Nissan Motors
- Mazda 2–1 Furukawa Electric

=== Semifinals ===
- Fujita Industries 2–0 Toyota Motors
- Nissan Motors 5–0 Mazda

=== Final ===
- Fujita Industries 0–2 Nissan Motors

Nissan Motors won the championship Excluded from the Asian Cup Winners' Cup 1986.
