= Yokohama F. Marinos =

Association football club in Japan

Yokohama F. Marinos 横浜F・マリノス
- Full name: Yokohama F·Marinos
- Nicknames: Marinos, Tricolor
- Founded: 1972; 54 years ago as Nissan Motor
- Stadium: Nissan Stadium
- Capacity: 72,327
- Owner: Nissan
- Chairman: Akihiro Nakayama
- Manager: Steve Corica
- League: J1 League
- 2026: J1 League, 13th of 20
- Website: www.f-marinos.com
Home colours	Away colours

Clubs owned by CFG Listed in order of acquisition/foundation. Bold indicates the club was founded by CFG. * indicates the club was acquired by CFG. § indicates the club is co-owned. † indicates the club is no longer owned by CFG.
2008	(England) Manchester City*
2009–2012
2013	(United States) **New York City FC**^{§}
2014	(Australia) Melbourne City*
2014	(Japan) Yokohama F. Marinos*^{†}
2015–2016
2017	(Uruguay) Montevideo City*
2017	(Spain) Girona*^{§}
2018
2019	(China) Shenzhen Peng City*^{§}
2019	(India) Mumbai City^{†}
2020	(Belgium) Lommel*
2020	(France) Troyes*
2021
2022	(Italy) Palermo*^{§}
2023	(Brazil) Bahia*^{§}

Yokohama F. Marinos (横浜F・マリノス, Yokohama Efu Marinosu), stylised as Yokohama F·Marinos, is a Japanese professional football club based in Yokohama, Kanagawa Prefecture, part of the Greater Tokyo Area. The club competes in the J1 League, which is the top tier of football in the country.

Having won the J-League title five times and finishing second twice, they are one of the most successful J-League clubs. The team is based in Yokohama and was founded as the company team of Nissan Motor. The club was formed by the merger of Yokohama Marinos and Yokohama Flügels in 1999, but has carried on the history and visual identity of Marinos. The current name is intended to reflect both of the original names. Yokohama F. Marinos is the longest serving team in the top flight of Japanese football, having played at the top level since 1982, also making them, along with Kashima Antlers, one of only two teams to have competed in Japan's top flight of football every year since the league was professionalized.

== History ==
=== As Nissan Motors (1972–1991) ===
The team traces its origins to 1972 as the Nissan Motors Football Club, based in Yokohama. Nissan won promotion to Division 2 Football League in 1976. Under coach Shu Kamo, the team won the Japan Soccer League in 1988 and 1989, as well as the JSL Cup in 1988, 1989 and 1990 and the Emperor's Cup in 1983, 1985, 1988, 1989 and 1991. The 1989 team won the "Triple Crown" - all three major tournaments in Japan - with famous players such as Kazushi Kimura, Takashi Mizunuma and Brazilian Oscar. At the end of the 1991–92 season, the team won the Asian Cup Winners' Cup.

=== As Yokohama Marinos (1992–1998) ===
Nissan obtained registration in the newly formed J.League to acquire professional club status and changed the club's name to Yokohama Marinos, a reference to Yokohama's status as a major port city. In their first seasons as a professional team, Yokohama Marinos continued to win competitions: triumphant in the Emperor's Cup, a second consecutive Asian Cup Winners' Cup, and their first J.League title in 1995. Matches between Yokohama Marinos and Verdy Kawasaki were known as the National Derby.

=== As Yokohama F. Marinos (1999–present) ===

The usual starting line-up of the 2019 J1 League winning team

In 1999, the club was renamed Yokohama F. Marinos after the technical and financial merger with Yokohama Flügels, which had declared bankruptcy. An F was added to the name to represent the Flügels half of the club. However, many Flügels fans have rejected the new team, feeling that their team was dissolved into the F. Marinos rather than merged with it. As a result, they refused to follow F. Marinos and instead created Yokohama FC, the new city rival of F. Marinos, with the help of public donations and an affiliation with IMG, a talent agency.

In 2000, Marinos were runner-up in the 2000 J1 League, where Shunsuke Nakamura was named the best player of the season.

On 27 October 2001, Marinos won the J.League Cup, defeating Júbilo Iwata in a 0–0 match where Marinos won the penalty shootout 3–1.

In the 2002 season, Marinos were league runners-up behind Júbilo Iwata.

==== Back-to-back league champions ====
In 2003 and 2004, Marinos became back-to-back league champions for the second time, in the professional era, with the stars of the team being South Koreans Ahn Jung-hwan, Yoo sang-chul and Japanese players Daisuke Oku, Tatsuhiko Kubo and Yuji Nakazawa (who was the best player of the year in 2004). Their coach was the Japanese Takeshi Okada, who was named the 'Best Coach of the Year' in 2003 and 2004.

From 2005 to 2008, with notable players Hayuma Tanaka, Hideo Ōshima, Daisuke Sakata and Koji Yamase, Marinos didn't achieve any single honours. The highest they reached during this period was the 2008 Emperor's Cup semi-final where they were knockout by Gamba Osaka in extra time.

In 2010, club legend Shunsuke Nakamura returned to Yokohama F. Marinos after 8 years and stayed until the end of the 2017 J1 League season.

On August 4, 2011, a year after leaving the club, former Marinos player Naoki Matsuda collapsed during training with Matsumoto Yamaga due to cardiac arrest and died at the age of 34. As a result, his former number 3 has been retired.

And after two semi-final defeats in 2011 and 2012, Marinos won the 2013 Emperor's Cup on 1 January 2014, the first after 21 years and in 2013, they were runner-up in the J.League for the second time in their history.

==== Owned by City Football Group ====
On 20 May 2014, it was announced that the City Football Group, a subsidiary of Abu Dhabi United Group, had invested in a minority stake in Yokohama F. Marinos, creating a partnership with the football club and the automaker Nissan.

And after consecutive defeats, such as a loss in the 2017 Emperor's Cup Final and in the 2018 J.League Cup Final, the team managed to get a good shape thanks to the direction of the Australian coach Ange Postecoglou, which ended 15 years of drought by winning the 2019 J1 League title, with emphasis on the participation of Teruhito Nakagawa being the 'Best Player of the Season' and top scorer with 15 goals together with Brazilian Marcos Júnior.

In 2020, Marinos made it out of the 2020 AFC Champions League group stage for the first time since the AFC Champions League switched to the current format. The club were drawn in Group H alongside Chinese Shanghai SIPG, South Korean Jeonbuk Hyundai Motors and Australian Sydney FC. Marinos qualified to the knockout stages as group leaders with 4 wins, 1 draw and 1 losses. However the club was bowed out from the tournament in the Round of 16 losing 3–2 to South Korean Suwon Samsung Bluewings.

In 2021, Marinos finished in second place 13 points behind league champions, Kawasaki Frontale where on 18 July 2021, Head coach Ange Postecoglou was signed by Scottish club, Celtic while Hideki Matsunaga will be the caretaker for the club until 18 July 2021, Marinos signed another Australian head coach, Kevin Muscat.

In 2022, Kevin Muscat steered the club to win their fifth J1 League title. The club also finished as group leaders in the 2022 AFC Champions League group stage being placed in Group H alongside South Korean Jeonbuk Hyundai Motors, Vietnamese Hoang Anh Gia Lai and Australian Sydney FC. Marinos qualified to the knockout stages with 4 wins, 1 draw and 1 losses where they faced another Japanese side Vissel Kobe in the Round of 16, however, the club suffered a 3–2 defeat to Vissel Kobe thus crashing out from the competition.

In 2023, Marinos than finished as league runners up with 64 points behind Vissel Kobe who got 71 points. Kevin Muscat than guided the club in the 2023–24 AFC Champions League group stage being drawn in Group G with Chinese Shandong Taishan, South Korean Incheon United and Filipino Kaya–Iloilo. Marinos finished the group tied with 12 points along with Shandong Taishan and Incheon United but qualified to the round of 16 as group leaders.

On 6 December 2023, Kevin Muscat resigned as the head coach in which Harry Kewell were appointed as the new head coach of the club on 31 December 2023 becoming the third consecutive Australian manager in the club history. Harry Kewell than guided the club in the round of 16 fixture against Thai Bangkok United, winning the match 3–2 on aggregate with Anderson Lopes scoring an injury time penalty in the 120th minute of extra time during the second leg sending the team to the quarter-finals. Marinos then faced off against Shandong Taishan again in which Marinos won 3–1 on aggregate thus seeing them to the semi-finals against South Korean Ulsan Hyundai. Marinos suffered a 1–0 defeat away in which the club bounced back in the second leg at home winning the match 3–2 thus seeing both club tied with 3–3 on aggregate sending the match into extra time and then penalties shootout. Marinos went on to win the penalties shootout 5–4 where vice-captain Eduardo scored the winning penalty to send the team to their first-ever Champions League final against Emirati Al Ain. They would start losing 0-1 during the first leg at home, but then came back with two goals from Asahi Uenaka and Kota Watanabe to make it 2–1 at the end of the match, but, unfortunately, they'd lose 5–1 away in the second leg (6–3 on aggregate), thus ending as runners-up of the competition.

On 25 June 2026, City Football Group transferred its entire shareholding in Yokohama F. Marinos to Nissan Motor Co., Ltd., making Nissan the sole owner of the club. Both parties stated that they would continue their relationship as partner clubs.

== Rivalries ==
Yokohama derby

- The classic among the most representative teams in the city of Yokohama, Yokohama F. Marinos, Yokohama FC and YSCC Yokohama. Between 1993 and 1998, the Yokohama derby corresponded only to the departure between the late Yokohama Flügels and Yokohama F. Marinos.

Kanagawa derby

- This is the derby played by the Kanagawa prefecture teams, currently the most important match is that of Yokohama F. Marinos and Kawasaki Frontale. Other Kanagawa derby rivals include Shonan Bellmare, Yokohama FC and YSCC Yokohama.

Previously, Verdy Kawasaki and the extinct Yokohama Flügels were Kanagawa derby rivals. With Verdy moving to Tokyo from Kawasaki, matches between the two clubs are no longer considered Kanagawa derbies.

== Kits and crests ==
Yokohama F. Marinos utilizes a three colour system composed of blue, white and red.

In 2012, Yokohama F. Marinos have unveiled a special edition 20th Anniversary jersey

=== Slogan ===
Year	Slogan
2009	Enjoy・Growing・Victory
2010	ACTIVE
2011	ACTIVE 2011
2012	All for Win
2013	All for Win -Realize
2014	All For Win -Fight it out!
2015–2017	Integral Goal - All for Win
2018	Brave and Challenging
2019	URBAN ELEGANCE TRICOLORE
2020	Brave and Challenging BRAVE BLUE
2021–2024	Brave and Challenging
2025	Be a Stunner

=== Kit suppliers and shirt sponsors ===
Period	Kit supplier	Shirt sponsor	Notes
1992–1996	Mizuno (J-League) and Adidas (Emperor's Cup)	Nissan	Kodak
1997–2007	Adidas	Nissan	ANA
2008–2011	Nike	Nissan	ANA
2012–present	Adidas	Nissan	SANEI ARCHITECTURE
2012–present	Adidas	Nissan	MUGEN ESTATE
2012–present	Adidas	Nissan	NISSHIN OILLIO

== Uniforms ==
**Home - 1st kits**
1992	1993 - 1994	1995 - 1996	1997 - 1998	1999 - 2000
2001	2002	2003	2004 - 2005	2006
2007	2008 - 2009	2010	2011	2012
2013	2014	2015	2016	2017
2018	2019	2020	2021	2022
2023	2024	2025	2026 -	

**Away - 2nd kits**
1992	1993 - 1996	1997 - 1998	1999 - 2000	2001 - 2002
2003 - 2004	2005 - 2006	2007	2008 - 2009	2010
2011	2012	2013	2014	2015
2016	2017	2018	2019	2020
2021	2022	2023	2024	2025
2026 -

**Other - 3rd kits**
1993 3rd	2001 - 2002 3rd	2004; ACL 1st	2009; Yokohama Port 150th anniversary	2012; 20 year anniversary
2013; PSM Memorial	2014; ACL 1st	2014; ACL 2nd	2014 commemoration of the 2014 Emperor's Cup victory	2015; Cup 1st
2015; CUP 2nd	2016; Cup 1st	2016; CUP 2nd	2016; Yokohama Port Opening Commemorative	2017; CUP 1st
2017; Cup 2nd	2017 SP	2018 SP	2019 SP; Yokohama; 160th Anniversary	2020 SP
2021 SP	2022 SP	2023 SP	2024 SP	2025 SP

== Stadiums ==
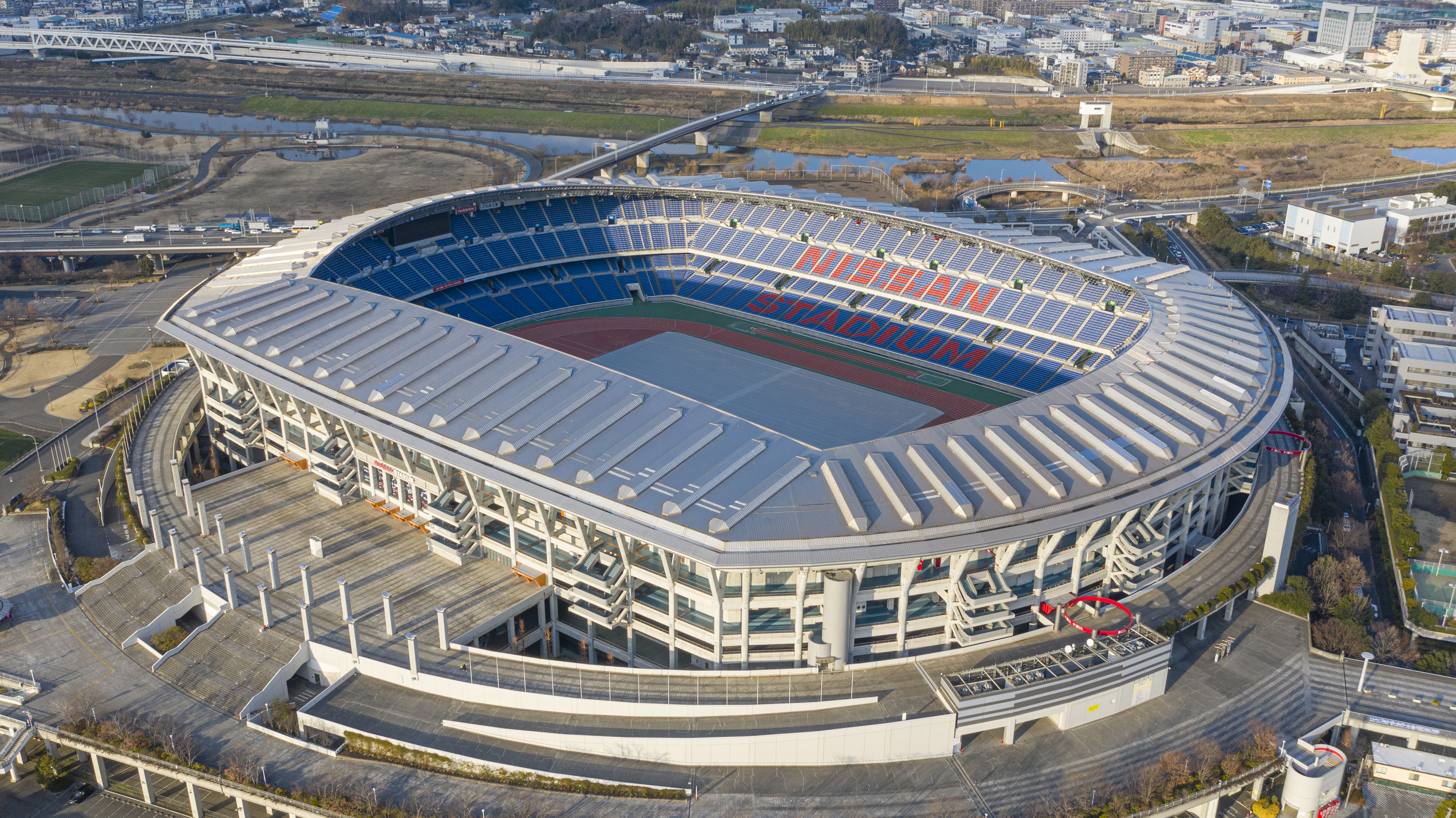
International Stadium Yokohama, one of the two home stadiums of the Yokohama F. Marinos

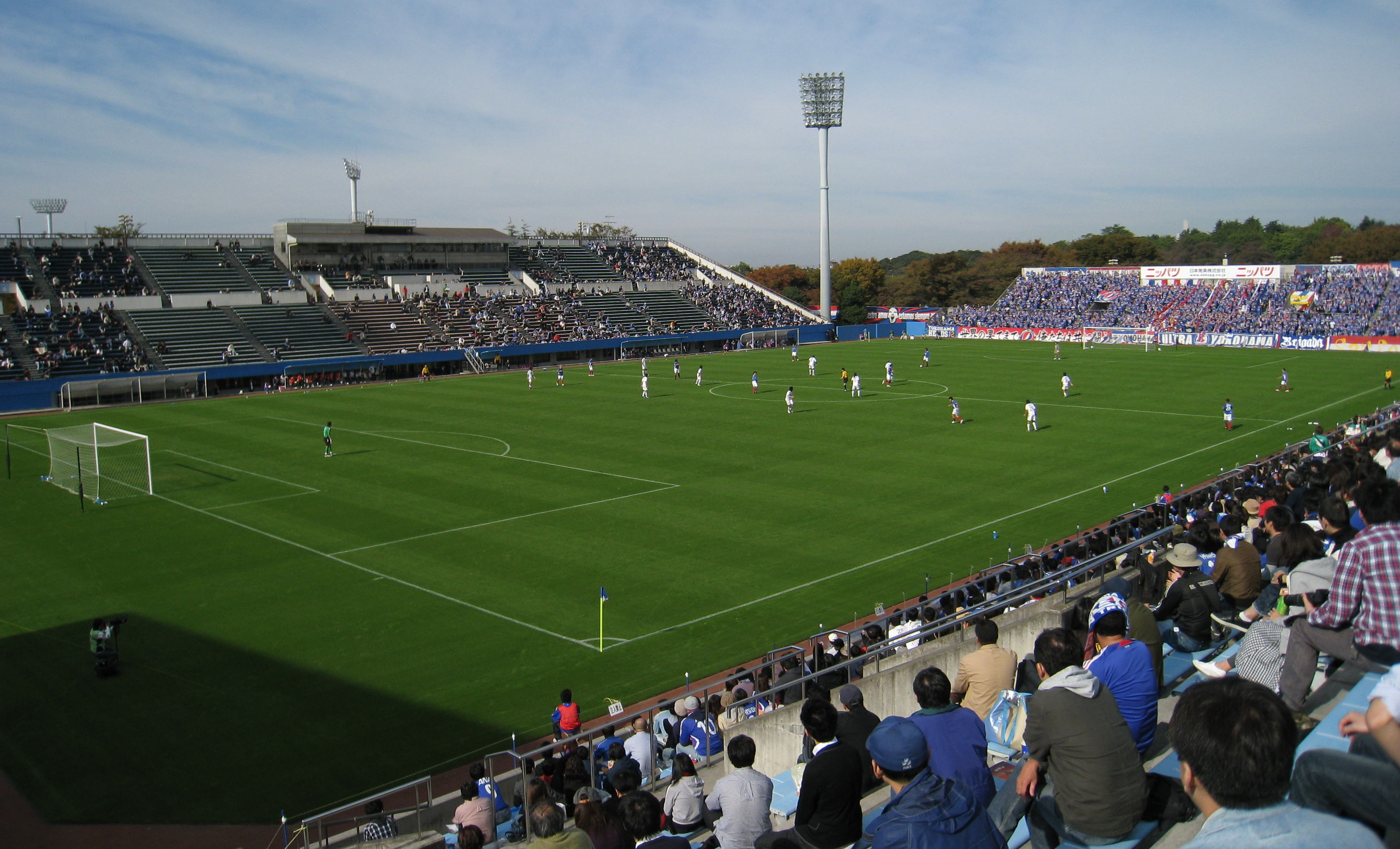
Mitsuzawa Stadium, one of the two home stadiums of the Yokohama F. Marinos

The team's home stadiums are Nissan Stadium, otherwise known as International Stadium Yokohama, and Mitsuzawa Stadium. The team trained at Marinos Town located in the area of Minato Mirai, but moved to Kozukue Field located next to the home ground in 2016.

== Theme song ==
The club's official theme song is "We Are F. Marinos" by Japanese duo Yuzu. The song was first released in 2005, with the song being used at games up to today, sometimes having mascot Marinos-kun dance to the song on a pedestal on the running track of Nissan Stadium.

== Players and staff ==
=== Current squad ===
As of 21 September 2026.

Note: Flags indicate national team as defined under FIFA eligibility rules; some limited exceptions apply. Players may hold more than one non-FIFA nationality.

No.	Pos.	Nation	Player
1	GK	JPN	Park Il-gyu
7	FW	JPN	Daiya Tōno
8	MF	JPN	Takuya Kida (captain)
9	FW	JPN	Kaina Tanimura
11	FW	BEL	Jordy Croux (vice-captain)
13	DF	JPN	Taisei Inoue
14	MF	JPN	Kei Chinen
15	DF	JPN	Taiki Watanabe
17	DF	COL	Jeison Quiñónes
18	FW	JPN	George Onaiwu
19	FW	BRA	Tevis (on loan from Cruzeiro)
20	GK	JPN	Yuya Tsuboi
21	GK	JPN	Hiroki Iikura
22	DF	JPN	Ryotaro Tsunoda (vice-captain)
23	FW	JPN	Ryō Miyaichi
24	FW	JPN	Tomoki Kondo
25	MF	JPN	Tōichi Suzuki
26	FW	ISR	Dean David

No.	Pos.	Nation	Player
27	DF	JPN	Ken Matsubara
28	MF	JPN	Riku Yamane
30	FW	BRA	Yuri
32	MF	JPN	Yuta Tanaka
33	DF	JPN	Kosei Suwama
34	MF	JPN	Takuto Kimura
35	DF	JPN	Kanta Sekitomi
36	GK	ESP	Rubén Blanco
39	FW	JPN	Hikaru Takahashi ^{DSP}
40	MF	JPN	Jun Amano
41	MF	JPN	Kosuke Matsumura ^{DSP}
43	FW	JPN	Rio Nitta
44	DF	AUS	Thomas Deng
47	MF	JPN	Shin Miidera
51	GK	JPN	Ryosei Kawai ^{Type 2}
54	DF	JPN	Shota Fujii ^{Type 2}
55	DF	JPN	Kanata Hirano ^{Type 2}

The official club website lists the club mascot as player #0 and the supporters as player #12.

=== Out on loan ===
Note: Flags indicate national team as defined under FIFA eligibility rules; some limited exceptions apply. Players may hold more than one non-FIFA nationality.

No.	Pos.	Nation	Player
—	GK	JPN	Ryoya Kimura (at Tegevajaro Miyazaki)
—	DF	JPN	Kei Murakami (at Matsumoto Yamaga FC)
—	GK	JPN	Tomoki Tagawa (at Hokkaido Consadole Sapporo)
—	FW	JPN	Hiroto Asada (at FC Gifu)

No.	Pos.	Nation	Player
—	MF	JPN	Kohei Mochizuki (at Zweigen Kanazawa)
—	DF	JPN	Reno Noguchi (at Azul Claro Numazu)
—	MF	TOG	Jean Claude (at (China) Shanghai Port)
—	MF	JPN	Aruto Higuchi (at Fukushima United FC)

=== Retired number ===
Note: Flags indicate national team as defined under FIFA eligibility rules; some limited exceptions apply. Players may hold more than one non-FIFA nationality.

No.	Pos.	Nation	Player
3	DF	JPN	Naoki Matsuda

== Club officials ==
Position	Name
Manager	(Japan) Hideo Oshima
Fitness coach	(Japan) Tomoo Tsukoshi
Goalkeeper coach	(Japan) Shigetatsu Matsunaga
Assistant goalkeeper coach	(Japan) Tetsuya Enomoto
Conditioning coach	(Japan) Yusuke Tanaka
Chief analyst	(Japan) Satoru Okada
Analyst	(Japan) Jun Yamaguchi
Performance data analyst	(Japan) Yuki Masui

== Managerial history ==
Manager	Nationality	Tenure	
Manager	Nationality	Start	Finish
Hidehiko Shimizu	Japan	1993	1994
Jorge Solari	Argentina	1995	1995
Hiroshi Hayano	Japan	1995	1996
Xabier Azkargorta	Spain	1997	August 1998
Antonio de la Cruz	Spain	August 1998	1999
Osvaldo Ardiles	Argentina	Jan 1, 2000	Dec 31, 2000
Yoshiaki Shimojo	Japan	2001	2001
Sebastião Lazaroni	Brazil	2001	2002
Yoshiaki Shimojo	Japan	2002	Dec 31, 2002
Takeshi Okada	Japan	Jan 1, 2003	Aug 24, 2006
Takashi Mizunuma	Japan	Aug 25, 2006	Dec 31, 2006
Hiroshi Hayano	Japan	Jan 1, 2007	Dec 31, 2007
Takashi Kuwahara	Japan	Jan 1, 2008	July 17, 2008
Kokichi Kimura	Japan	July 18, 2008	Dec 31, 2009
Kazushi Kimura	Japan	Feb 16, 2010	Dec 31, 2011
Yasuhiro Higuchi	Japan	Dec 30, 2011	Dec 7, 2014
Erick Mombaerts	France	Dec 16, 2014	Jan 1, 2018
Ange Postecoglou	Australia	Jan 1, 2018	June 10, 2021
Hideki Matsunaga (caretaker)	Japan	June 10, 2021	July 18, 2021
Kevin Muscat	Australia	July 18, 2021	December 13, 2023
Harry Kewell	Australia	Dec 31, 2023	July 15, 2024
John Hutchinson (caretaker)	Malta	July 16, 2024	December 9, 2024
Steve Holland	England	December 17, 2024	April 18, 2025
Patrick Kisnorbo	Australia	April 18, 2025	June 19, 2025
Hideo Ōshima	Japan	June 19, 2025	2026
Steve Corica	Australia	2026	Present

== Honours ==
Yokohama F. Marinos honours
Honour	No.	Years
All Japan Senior Football Championship	1	1976
Emperor's Cup	7	1983, 1985, 1988, 1989, 1991 1992, 2013
Japan Soccer League Division 1/J1 League	7	1988–89, 1989–90, 1995, 2003, 2004, 2019, 2022
JSL Cup/J.League Cup	4	1988, 1989, 1990, 2001
Asian Cup Winners' Cup	2	1991–92, 1992–93
Japanese Super Cup	1	2023

== International players ==
This list includes players that were called up to their national teams while playing at Yokohama F. Marinos, either to participate in official or friendly competitions, friendly matches or in training camps.

**Japan**: (Japan) Akihiro Endo; (Japan) Yasuhiro Hato; (Japan) Masami Ihara; (Japan) Shoji Jo; (Japan) Yoshikatsu Kawaguchi; (Japan) Kazushi Kimura; (Japan) Tatsuhiko Kubo; (Japan) Yuzo Kurihara; (Japan) Naoki Matsuda; (Japan) Shigetatsu Matsunaga; (Japan) Takashi Mizunuma; (Japan) Shunsuke Nakamura; (Japan) Eisuke Nakanishi; (Japan) Yuji Nakazawa; (Japan) Daisuke Oku; (Japan) Norio Omura; (Japan) Daisuke Sakata; (Japan) Hayuma Tanaka; (Japan) Yoshiharu Ueno; (Japan) Kazuma Watanabe; (Japan) Koji Yamase; (Japan) Takefusa Kubo; (Japan) Shinnosuke Hatanaka; (Japan) Ken Matsubara; (Japan) Kota Watanabe; (Japan) Daizen Maeda; (Japan) Ryo Miyaichi; (Japan) Takuma Nishimura; (Japan) Tomoki Iwata; (Japan) Ryuta Koike; (Japan) Joel Chima Fujita; (Japan) Kota Mizunuma	**AFC**/**OFC**/**CAF**: (Australia) Miloš Degenek; (South Korea) Kim Kun-hoan; (South Korea) Shin Byung-ho; (South Korea) Yoo Sang-chul; (South Korea) Yun Il-lok; (Thailand) Theerathon Bunmathan; (Indonesia) Sandy Walsh	**CONMEBOL**: (Argentina) Alberto Acosta; (Argentina) Pablo Bastianini; (Argentina) David Bisconti; (Argentina) Ramón Díaz; (Argentina) Darío Figueroa; (Argentina) Néstor Gorosito; (Argentina) Raul Maldonado; (Argentina) Pedro Massacessi; (Argentina) Ramón Medina Bello; (Argentina) Gustavo Zapata; (Bolivia) Julio César Baldivieso; (Uruguay) Marcelo Lipatín	**UEFA**: (North Macedonia) David Babunski; (Croatia) Igor Jovićević; (Croatia) Goran Jurić; (Serbia) Dušan Petković; (Spain) Andoni Goikoetxea; (Spain) Julio Salinas; (Portugal) Hugo Vieira	**CONCACAF**: (Curaçao) Quenten Martinus

== Club captains ==
- (Japan) Shigetatsu Matsunaga 1993
- (Japan) Masami Ihara 1994–1998
- (Japan) Yoshiharu Ueno 1999–2000
- (Japan) Norio Omura 2001
- (Japan) Naoki Matsuda 2002–2003
- (Japan) Daisuke Oku 2004
- (Japan) Naoki Matsuda 2005–2006
- (Japan) Yuji Nakazawa 2007
- (Japan) Ryuji Kawai 2008–2009
- (Japan) Yuzo Kurihara 2010
- (Japan) Shunsuke Nakamura 2011–2016
- (Japan) Manabu Saito 2017
- (Japan) Yuji Nakazawa 2018
- (Japan) Takuya Kida 2019–present

== Players who played in the FIFA World Cup ==
The list includes players who were called up to their national teams while playing at Yokohama F. Marinos, to represent their country in the FIFA World Cup .

- 1994 FIFA World Cup: Ramón Medina Bello
- 1998 FIFA World Cup: Masami Ihara, Shoji Jo, Yoshikatsu Kawaguchi, Norio Omura, César Sampaio
- 2002 FIFA World Cup: Naoki Matsuda
- 2006 FIFA World Cup: Yuji Nakazawa
- 2010 FIFA World Cup: Yuji Nakazawa, Shunsuke Nakamura
- 2014 FIFA World Cup: Manabu Saito
- 2018 FIFA World Cup: Milos Degenek

== Record as J.League member ==
Champions	Runners-up	Third place	Promoted	Relegated

Season	Div.	Teams	Pos.	Attendance/G	J.League Cup	Emperor's Cup	Asia	
1992	–	–	–	–	Group stage	Winners	CWC	Winners
1993	J1	10	**4th**	16,781	Group stage	Quarter-final	CWC	Withdrew
1994	J1	12	**6th**	19,801	Semi-final	Semi-final	–	
1995	J1	14	**1st**	18,326	–	2nd round	–	
1996	J1	16	**8th**	14,589	Group stage	3rd round	CC	Group stage
1997	J1	17	**3rd**	9,211	Group stage	Round of 16	–	
1998	J1	18	**4th**	19,165	Group stage	3rd round	–	
1999	J1	16	**4th**	20,095	Quarter-final	Quarter-final	–	
2000	J1	16	**2nd**	16,644	Quarter-final	Quarter-final	–	
2001	J1	16	**13th**	20,595	Winners	3rd round	–	
2002	J1	16	**2nd**	24,108	Group stage	Round of 16	–	
2003	J1	16	**1st**	24,957	Quarter-final	Quarter-final	–	
2004	J1	16	**1st**	24,818	Quarter-final	Round of 16	CL	Group stage
2005	J1	18	**9th**	25,713	Semi-final	Round of 16	CL	Group stage
2006	J1	18	**9th**	23,663	Semi-final	Quarter-final	–	
2007	J1	18	**7th**	24,039	Semi-final	Round of 16	–	
2008	J1	18	**9th**	23,682	Quarter-final	Semi-final	–	
2009	J1	18	**10th**	22,057	Semi-final	Round of 16	–	
2010	J1	18	**8th**	25,684	Group stage	Round of 16	–	
2011	J1	18	**5th**	21,038	Quarter-final	Semi-final	–	
2012	J1	18	**4th**	22,946	Group stage	Semi-final	–	
2013	J1	18	**2nd**	27,496	Semi-final	Winners	–	
2014	J1	18	**7th**	23,088	Quarter-final	3rd round	CL	Group stage
2015	J1	18	**7th**	24,221	Group stage	Round of 16	–	
2016	J1	18	**10th**	24,004	Semi-final	Semi-final	–	
2017	J1	18	**5th**	24,180	Group stage	Runners-up	–	
2018	J1	18	**12th**	21,788	Runners-up	Round of 16	–	
2019	J1	18	**1st**	27,010	Group stage	Round of 16	–	
2020 †	J1	18	**9th**	7,968	Semi-final	Did not qualify	CL	Round of 16
2021 †	J1	20	**2nd**	8,991	Play-off	2nd round	–	
2022	J1	18	**1st**	19,811	Quarter-final	3rd round	CL	Round of 16
2023	J1	18	**2nd**	27,716	Semi-final	3rd round	CL	Runner-up
2024	J1	20	**9th**	24,843	Semi-final	Semi-final	CLE	Quarter-final
2025	J1	20	**15th**	26,577	Quarter-final	2nd round		
2026	J1	10	**TBD**		N/A	N/A		
2026-27	J1	20	**TBD**		TBD	TBD		

Key

- Pos. = Position
- Attendance/G = Average home league attendance
- † 2020 & 2021 seasons attendances reduced by COVID-19 worldwide pandemic
- Source: J.League Data Site

== Continental record ==
Season	Competition	Round	Club	Home	Away	Aggregate
1989–90	Asian Club Championship	Qualifying round (Group 6)	(China) Liaoning	0–1		**2nd out of 4**
1989–90	Asian Club Championship	Qualifying round (Group 6)	(Macau) Hap Kuan	9–0		**2nd out of 4**
1989–90	Asian Club Championship	Qualifying round (Group 6)	(North Korea) Chadongcha	2–0		**2nd out of 4**
1989–90	Asian Club Championship	Group A	(Malaysia) Kuala Lumpur City	2–1		**1st out of 3**
1989–90	Asian Club Championship	Group A	(Oman) Fanja	1–0		**1st out of 3**
1989–90	Asian Club Championship	Final	(China) Liaoning	1–2	1–1	**2–3**
1990–91	Asian Club Championship	Qualifying round (Group 7)	(North Korea) April 25	0–1		**3rd out of 3**
1990–91	Asian Club Championship	Qualifying round (Group 7)	(China) Liaoning	2–3		**3rd out of 3**
1991–92	Asian Cup Winners' Cup	Quarter-finals	(India) East Bengal	4–0	3–1	**4–1**
1991–92	Asian Cup Winners' Cup	Semi-finals	(Indonesia) Pupuk Kaltim	2–0	0–0	**2–0**
1991–92	Asian Cup Winners' Cup	Final	(Saudi Arabia) Al-Nassr	5–0	1–1	**6–1**
1992–93	Asian Cup Winners' Cup	Second round	(Indonesia) Pupuk Kaltim	3–1	1–1	**4–2**
1992–93	Asian Cup Winners' Cup	Semi-finals	(Vietnam) SHB Đà Nẵng	3–0	1–1	**4–1**
1992–93	Asian Cup Winners' Cup	Final	(Iran) Persepolis	1–1	1–0	**2–1**
1993–94	Asian Cup Winners' Cup	First round	(Philippines) Philippine Air Force	5–0	1–0	**6–0**
1993–94	Asian Cup Winners' Cup	Quarter-finals	(Indonesia) Semen Padang	11–0	1–2	**12–2**
1993–94	Asian Cup Winners' Cup	Semi-finals	(Hong Kong) South China	**w/o**		
1996–97	Asian Club Championship	First round	(Macau) GD Artilheiros	**w/o**		
1996–97	Asian Club Championship	Second round	(Malaysia) Johor Darul Ta'zim	2–0	1–1	**3–1**
1996–97	Asian Club Championship	Quarter-finals (East Asia Group)	(South Korea) Pohang Steelers	2–2		**3rd out of 4**
1996–97	Asian Club Championship	Quarter-finals (East Asia Group)	(South Korea) Seongnam FC	2–3		**3rd out of 4**
1996–97	Asian Club Championship	Quarter-finals (East Asia Group)	(Maldives) New Radiant	10–0		**3rd out of 4**
2004	AFC Champions League	Group G	(Vietnam) Bình Định	6–0	3–0	**2nd out of 4**
2004	AFC Champions League	Group G	(Indonesia) Persik Kediri	4–0	4–1	**2nd out of 4**
2004	AFC Champions League	Group G	(South Korea) Seongnam FC	1–2	1–0	**2nd out of 4**
2004	A3 Champions Cup	Table	(South Korea) Seongnam FC	0–3		**2nd out of 4**
2004	A3 Champions Cup	Table	(China) Shanghai Shenhua	2–0		**2nd out of 4**
2004	A3 Champions Cup	Table	(China) Shanghai International	2–1		**2nd out of 4**
2005	AFC Champions League	Group F	(China) Shandong Taishan	0–1	1–2	**2nd out of 4**
2005	AFC Champions League	Group F	(Indonesia) PSM Makassar	3–0	2–0	**2nd out of 4**
2005	AFC Champions League	Group F	(Thailand) Police Tero	2–0	2–1	**2nd out of 4**
2005	A3 Champions Cup	Table	(South Korea) Pohang Steelers	1–1		**3rd out of 4**
2005	A3 Champions Cup	Table	(China) Shenzhen Jianlibao	2–0		**3rd out of 4**
2005	A3 Champions Cup	Table	(South Korea) Suwon Samsung Bluewings	1–3		**3rd out of 4**
2014	AFC Champions League	Group G	(South Korea) Jeonbuk Hyundai Motors	2–1	0–3	**4th out of 4**
2014	AFC Champions League	Group G	(China) Guangzhou	1–1	1–2	**4th out of 4**
2014	AFC Champions League	Group G	(Australia) Melbourne Victory	3–2	0–1	**4th out of 4**
2020	AFC Champions League	Group H	(South Korea) Jeonbuk Hyundai Motors	4–1	2–1	**1st out of 4**
2020	AFC Champions League	Group H	(Australia) Sydney FC	4–0	1–1	**1st out of 4**
2020	AFC Champions League	Group H	(China) Shanghai Port	1–2	1–0	**1st out of 4**
2020	AFC Champions League	Round of 16	(South Korea) Suwon Samsung Bluewings	**2–3**		
2022	AFC Champions League	Group H	(South Korea) Jeonbuk Hyundai Motors	0–1	1–1	**1st out of 4**
2022	AFC Champions League	Group H	(Vietnam) Hoàng Anh Gia Lai	2–0	2–1	**1st out of 4**
2022	AFC Champions League	Group H	(Australia) Sydney FC	3–0	1–0	**1st out of 4**
2022	AFC Champions League	Round of 16	(Japan) Vissel Kobe	**2–3**		
2023–24	AFC Champions League	Group G	(South Korea) Incheon United	2–4	1–2	**1st out of 4**
2023–24	AFC Champions League	Group G	(China) Shandong Taishan	3–0	1–0	**1st out of 4**
2023–24	AFC Champions League	Group G	(Philippines) Kaya-Iloilo	3–0	2–1	**1st out of 4**
2023–24	AFC Champions League	Round of 16	(Thailand) Bangkok United	1–0 (a.e.t.)	2–2	**3–2**
2023–24	AFC Champions League	Quarter-finals	(China) Shandong Taishan	1–0	2–1	**3–1**
2023–24	AFC Champions League	Semi-finals	(South Korea) Ulsan Hyundai	3–2 (a.e.t.)	0–1	**3–3** **(5–4 p)**
2023–24	AFC Champions League	Final	(United Arab Emirates) Al Ain	2–1	1–5	**3–6**
2024–25	AFC Champions League Elite	League stage (East region)	(South Korea) Gwangju	3–7		**1st out of 11**
2024–25	AFC Champions League Elite	League stage (East region)	(South Korea) Ulsan HD	4–0		**1st out of 11**
2024–25	AFC Champions League Elite	League stage (East region)	(China) Shandong Taishan	2–2 (Voided)		**1st out of 11**
2024–25	AFC Champions League Elite	League stage (East region)	(Thailand) Buriram United	5–0		**1st out of 11**
2024–25	AFC Champions League Elite	League stage (East region)	(South Korea) Pohang Steelers	2–0		**1st out of 11**
2024–25	AFC Champions League Elite	League stage (East region)	(Australia) Central Coast Mariners	4–0		**1st out of 11**
2024–25	AFC Champions League Elite	League stage (East region)	(China) Shanghai Shenhua	1–0		**1st out of 11**
2024–25	AFC Champions League Elite	League stage (East region)	(China) Shanghai Port	2–0		**1st out of 11**
2024–25	AFC Champions League Elite	Round of 16	(China) Shanghai Port	4–1	1–0	**5–1**
2024–25	AFC Champions League Elite	Quarter-finals	(Saudi Arabia) Al Nassr	**1–4**		

=== Performance in AFC competitions ===
- **AFC Champions League Elite: 10 appearances**
  1989–90: Runners-up
  1990–91: Group stage
  1996–97: Quarter-finals
  2004: Group stage
  2005: Group stage
  2014: Group stage
  2020: Round of 16
  2022: Round of 16
  2023–24: Runners-up
  2024–25: Quarter-finals
- **Asian Cup Winners' Cup: 3 appearances**
  1991–92: **Winners**
  1992–93: **Winners**
  1993–94: Semi-finals

== Awards ==
J.League MVP Award:

- Shunsuke Nakamura (2000; 2013)
- Yuji Nakazawa (2004)
- Teruhito Nakagawa (2019)
- Tomoki Iwata (2022)

J.League Top Scorer:

- Ramón Díaz (1993)
- Teruhito Nakagawa (2019)
- Marcos Júnior (2019)
- Daizen Maeda (2021)
- Anderson Lopes (2023)
- Anderson Lopes (2024)

J.League Rookie of the Year:

- Yoshikatsu Kawaguchi (1995)
- Daisuke Nasu (2003)
- Kazuma Watanabe (2009)

J.League Manager of the Year:

- Takeshi Okada (2003; 2004)
- Ange Postecoglou (2019)
- Kevin Muscat (2022)

J.League Fair Play Award:

- Daisuke Sakata (2007)
- Yuji Nakazawa (2015; 2017)

J.League Monthly MVP :

- Shunsuke Nakamura (March 2013)
- Tetsuya Enomoto (October 2013)
- Manabu Saito (August 2015)
- Shunsuke Nakamura (October 2015)
- Manabu Saito (October 2016; November 2016)
- Yuji Nakazawa (June 2017)
- Takuya Kida (May 2019)
- Teruhito Nakagawa (October 2019)
- Erik (September 2020)
- Leo Ceara (August 2021)
- Kota Mizunuma (June 2022)
- Tomoki Iwata (September 2022)

J.League Best XI:

- 1993: Shigetatsu Matsunaga, Masami Ihara, Ramón Díaz
- 1994: Masami Ihara
- 1995: Masami Ihara, Masaharu Suzuki
- 1996: Masami Ihara
- 1997: Masami Ihara
- 1999: Shunsuke Nakamura
- 2000: Naoki Matsuda, Shunsuke Nakamura
- 2002: Naoki Matsuda
- 2003: Yuji Nakazawa, Daisuke Oku, Tatsuhiko Kubo, Dutra
- 2004: Yuji Nakazawa, Daisuke Oku, Dutra
- 2005: Yuji Nakazawa
- 2008: Yuji Nakazawa
- 2013: Yuji Nakazawa, Shunsuke Nakamura
- 2019: Teruhito Nakagawa, Marcos Júnior, Takuya Kida, Thiago Martins
- 2021: Daizen Maeda
- 2022: Élber, Kota Mizunuma, Tomoki Iwata, Ryuta Koike, Yohei Takaoka
- 2023: Anderson Lopes
- 2024: Anderson Lopes

AFC Champions League Best XI:

- 2020: Takuya Kida, Teruhito Nakagawa

J.League Cup MVP:

- 2001: Tatsuya Enomoto

J.League Cup New Hero:

- 2013: Manabu Saito
- 2018: Keita Endo
- 2024: Riku Yamane

== Players who played in the national team ==
- **Rei Fahd** cup 1995 Arabia Saudita: Shigetatsu Matsunaga, Masami Ihara
- Confederations Cup 2001 Japan and South Korea: Yoshikatsu Kawaguchi, Naoki Matsuda, Yasuhiro Hato
- Confederations Cup 2003 France: Daisuke Oku
- Confederations Cup 2013 Brazil: Yuzo Kurihara
- **Asian Cup** 1988 Qatar: Satoru Noda
- **Asian Cup** 1992 Japan: Shigetatsu Matsunaga, Toshinobu Katsuya, Masami Ihara, Takahiro Yamada, Takuya Jinno
- **Asian Cup** 1996 United Arab Emirates: Masami Ihara, Norio Omura
- **Asian Cup** 2000 Lebanon: Yoshikatsu Kawaguchi, Naoki Matsuda, Atsuhiro Miura, Shunsuke Nakamura
- **Asian Cup** 2004 China: Naoki Matsuda, Yuji Nakazawa
- **Asian Cup** 2007 Indonesia/Malaysia/Thailand/Vietnam: Yuji Nakazawa
- olympic games 1996 Atlanta: Yoshikatsu Kawaguchi, Akihiro Endo, Naoki Matsuda
- **olympic games** 2000 Sydney: Naoki Matsuda, Shunsuke Nakamura, Atsuhiro Miura
- olympic games 2004 Athens: Daisuke Nasu
- olympic games 2012 London: Manabu Saito
- olympic games 2020 Tokyo: Daizen Maeda
- olympic games 2024 Paris: Asahi Uenaka
- U-20 World Cup 1995 Qatar: Naoki Matsuda
- U-20 World Cup 1997 Malaysia: Shunsuke Nakamura
- U-20 World Cupe 1999 Nigeria: Tatsuya Enomoto
- U-20 World Cup 2003 United Arab Emirates: Daisuke Sakata, Yuzo Kurihara, Yutaro Abe
- **U-20 World Cup** 2007 Canada: Mike Havenaar
- **U-20 World Cup** 2017 South Korea: Keita Endo
- **U-20 World Cup** 2019 Poland: Kota Yamada
- **U-20 World Cup** **2023** Argentina: Riku Yamane
- U-17 World Cup 2001 Trinidad and Tobago: Sho Kitano
- U-17 World Cup 2007 South Korea: Takashi Kanai, Kota Mizunuma, Jin Hanato, Manabu Saito
- U-17 World Cup 2011 Mexico: Takuya Kida
- U-17 World Cup 2017 India: Naoki Tsubaki
- U-17 World Cup 2025 Qatar: Fujii Shota, Hiroto Asada
- East Asian Cup 2003 Japan: Tatsuhiko Kubo, Daisuke Oku, Yuji Nakazawa
- East Asian Cup 2005 South Korea: Yuji Nakazawa
- East Asian Cup 2008 China: Koji Yamase, Yuji Nakazawa
- East Asian Cup 2010 Japan: Yuji Nakazawa
- East Asian Cup 2013 South Korea: Yuzo Kurihara, Manabu Saito
- East Asian Cup 2019 South Korea: Shinnosuke Hatanaka, Keita Endo, Teruhito Nakagawa
- East Asian Cup 2022 Japan: Shinnosuke Hatanaka, Ryuta Koike, Tomoki Iwata, JoelChima Fujita, Kota Mizunuma, Ryo Miyaichi, Takuma Nishimura

== Players who have worn the club's jersey the most times ==
Rank			games
1	(Japan) Yuji Nakazawa	2002–2018	510
2	(Japan) Naoki Matsuda	1995–2010	385
3	(Japan) Shunsuke Nakamura	1997–2002 2010–2016	338
4	(Japan) Yuzo Kurihara	2002-2019	316
5	(Japan) Yoshiharu Ueno	1994-2007	287
6	(Japan) Shingo Hyodo	2008-2016	268
7	(Japan) Takuya Kida	2012-	267
8	(Japan) Norio Omura	1992-2001	248
9	(Japan) Daisuke Sakata	2001-2010	247
10	(Japan) Hiroki Iikura	2005-2019 2023-	243

== Top scorers in the club's history ==
Rank			goals
1	(Japan) Shunsuke Nakamura	1997–2002 2010–2016	68
2	(Japan) Shoji Jo	1997–2001	59
3	(Brazil) Anderson Lopes	2022-2025	58
4	(Argentina) David Bisconti	1993-96	53
5	(Argentina) Ramón Díaz	1993–95	52
6	(Japan) Daisuke Sakata	2001-2010	46
7	(Brazil) Marcos Jr	2019-2023	37
8	(Argentina) Ramón Medina Bello	1994–1995	36
9	(Japan) Teruhito Nakagawa	2015-2022	35
10	(Japan) Hideo Oshima	2005-2008	34
10	(Spain) Julio Salinas	1997-1998	34
10	(Brazil) Marquinhos	2003 2012–2013	34

== In popular culture ==
In the manga series – Captain Tsubasa, one of the characters was Yokohama Marinos midfielder Mamoru Izawa.

== Base categories ==
The Yokohama F. Marinos youth academy started in 1986, before the opening of the J-League. The youth academy is divided into 3 categories U-12, U-15 and U-18, and has included many well known players, Shunsuke Nakamura, Manabu Saito, Jungo Fujimoto, Mike Havenaar, Hiroki Iikura, Takashi Amano, Hiroyuki Taniguchi, Tetsuya Enomoto, Yuzo Kurihara, Hayuma Tanaka, Yuki Kaneko, Daisuke Sakata, Naohiro Ishikawa, Rikizo Matsuhashi, Eitaro Matsuda, Kota Yamada, Keita Endo, Ryo Takano, Takuya Kida, Andrew Kumagai, Yuji Ono, Jun Amano, Sho Matsumoto, Jin Hanato, Kota Mizunuma, Takashi Kanai, Masakazu Tashiro, Yota Akimoto etc. ... .

- All Japan Club Youth Soccer Tournament
- JFA Prince League Kanto
- Prince Takamado Trophy
- J-Youth Cup
- JFA Championship
- Danone Nations Cup

== Social media ==
Platform	Followers
Facebook	100,000
Twitter	510,361
Instagram	135,883
YouTube	101,000
TikTok	72,900
