= 1983 JSL Cup =

Tournament details
- Country: Japan

Final positions
- Champions: Yanmar Diesel
- Runners-up: Nissan Motors
- Semifinalists: Fujita Industries; Nippon Kokan

Statistics of JSL Cup in the 1983 season.

== Overview ==
It was contested by 20 teams, and Yanmar Diesel won the championship.

== Results ==
=== 1st round ===
- Yomiuri 1-1 (PK 3–1) Nippon Steel
- Kofu 1-1 (PK 4–1) Toho Titanium
- Furukawa Electric 0-1 Nippon Kokan
- Tanabe Pharmaceuticals 1-0 Saitama Teachers

=== 2nd round ===
- Yanmar Diesel 5-1 Mitsubishi Motors
- Yomiuri 4-2 Fujitsu
- Toyota Motors 3-0 Kofu
- Fujita Industries 1-0 Mazda
- Toshiba 2-2 (PK 4–2) Yamaha Motors
- Nippon Kokan 2-1 Sumitomo Metals
- Nissan Motors 3-1 Tanabe Pharmaceuticals
- Honda 3-1 Hitachi

=== Quarterfinals ===
- Yanmar Diesel 1-0 Yomiuri
- Toyota Motors 1-3 Fujita Industries
- Toshiba 1-3 Nippon Kokan
- Nissan Motors 2-1 Honda

=== Semifinals ===
- Yanmar Diesel 1-1 (PK 3–2) Fujita Industries
- Nippon Kokan 3-3 (PK 3–4) Nissan Motors

=== Final ===
- Yanmar Diesel 1-0 Nissan Motors

Yanmar Diesel won the championship
