= 1983 Emperor's Cup =

Tournament details
- Country: Japan

Final positions
- Champions: Yanmar Diesel
- Runners-up: Furukawa Electric
- Semifinalists: Fujita Industries; Nippon Kokan

Statistics of Emperor's Cup in the 1983 season.

== Overview ==
It was contested by 28 teams, and Nissan Motors won the championship.

== Results ==
=== 1st round ===
- Fukushima FC 0–5 Fujitsu
- Nippon Steel 2–2 (PK 2–3) Teijin
- Tanabe Pharmaceuticals 1–7 Nissan Motors
- Yomiuri 4–0 Aichi Gakuin University
- Waseda University 0–2 Yamaha Motors
- Niigata Eleven 1–9 Osaka University of Health and Sport Sciences
- Nippon Kokan 4–0 Sapporo University
- Honda 4–2 Toshiba
- Sumitomo Metals 2–1 Hitachi
- Mazda 5–0 Fukuoka University
- Matsushita Electric 3–1 Kawasaki Steel Mizushima
- Osaka University of Commerce 2–1 Daikyo Oil

=== 2nd round ===
- Mitsubishi Motors 1–2 Fujitsu
- Teijin 1–4 Nissan Motors
- Yomiuri 1–0 Yamaha Motors
- Osaka University of Health and Sport Sciences 1–1 (PK 1–3) Fujita Industries
- Furukawa Electric 2–3 Nippon Kokan
- Honda 3–0 Sumitomo Metals
- Mazda 2–0 Matsushita Electric
- Osaka University of Commerce 0–0 (PK 2–3) Yanmar Diesel

=== Quarterfinals ===
- Fujitsu 0–6 Nissan Motors
- Yomiuri 0–0 (PK 2–4) Fujita Industries
- Nippon Kokan 2–1 Honda
- Mazda 2–3 Yanmar Diesel

=== Semifinals ===
- Nissan Motors 3–2 Fujita Industries
- Nippon Kokan 0–1 Yanmar Diesel

=== Final ===
- Nissan Motors 2–0 Yanmar Diesel

Nissan Motors won the championship.
