= List of Japan international footballers =

This is a list of Japan international footballers – Japanese association football players who have played for the Japan national football team as recorded by the Japan Football Association.

== Players ==
- Bold players have been called up to the Japan national football team in the last 12 months.

Updated: December 05, 2022
Player	Caps	Goals	First game	Last game
Shusaku Nishikawa	31	0	2009.10.08	2016
Shuichi Gonda	18	0	2010.01.06	
Daiya Maekawa	0	0	2021.03.25	2021.03.25
Maya Yoshida	104	11	2010.01.06	2022.12.05
Takehiro Tomiyasu	21	1	2018.10.12	2021.03.25
Yuto Nagatomo	122	4	2008.05.24	2022.12.05
Shinji Okazaki	119	50	2008.10.09	2019.06.24
Shinji Kagawa	97	31	2008.05.24	2019.03.26
Teruhito Nakagawa	2	0	2019.12.14	2019.12.18
Ao Tanaka	2	0	2019.12.14	2019.12.18
Tsukasa Morishima	2	0	2019.12.10	2019.12.18
Keita Endo	2	0	2019.12.10	2019.12.18
Daiki Hashioka	2	0	2019.12.10	2019.12.18
Yuki Soma	3	0	2019.12.10	2019.12.18
Ayase Ueda	6	0	2019.06.17	2019.12.18
Shinnosuke Hatanaka	7	0	2019.03.26	2019.12.18
Musashi Suzuki	7	1	2019.03.22	2019.12.18
Sho Sasaki	9	0	2018.09.11	2019.12.18
Genta Miura	10	1	2017.12.12	2019.12.18
Kosuke Nakamura	6	0	2017.12.09	2019.12.18
Yosuke Ideguchi	15	2	2017.06.07	2019.12.18
Ryota Oshima	7	0	2016.09.01	2019.12.18
Taiyo Koga	1	0	2019.12.14	2019.12.14
Shunta Tanaka	1	0	2019.12.14	2019.12.14
Tsuyoshi Watanabe	1	0	2019.12.14	2019.12.14
Daiki Suga	1	1	2019.12.14	2019.12.14
Koki Ogawa	1	3	2019.12.14	2019.12.14
Kyosuke Tagawa	2	1	2019.12.10	2019.12.14
Keisuke Osako	2	0	2019.06.17	2019.12.14
Kento Hashimoto	7	0	2019.03.26	2019.12.10
Kyogo Furuhashi	1	0	2019.11.19	2019.11.19
Shoya Nakajima	19	5	2018.03.23	2019.11.19
Naomichi Ueda	11	0	2017.12.12	2019.11.19
Sei Muroya	10	0	2017.12.09	2019.11.19
Takuma Asano	20	4	2015.08.02	2019.11.19
Gaku Shibasaki	45	3	2014.09.09	2019.11.19
Hotaru Yamaguchi	48	3	2013.07.21	2019.11.19
Genki Haraguchi	53	11	2011.10.07	2019.11.19
Kensuke Nagai	12	3	2010.01.06	2019.11.19
Eiji Kawashima	91	0	2008.02.17	2019.11.19
Junya Ito	17	2	2017.12.09	2019.11.14
Takumi Minamino	22	11	2015.10.13	2019.11.14
Wataru Endo	22	1	2015.08.02	2019.11.14
Hiroki Sakai	61	1	2012.05.23	2019.11.14
Takefusa Kubo	7	0	2019.06.09	2019.10.15
Daichi Kamada	4	1	2019.03.22	2019.10.15
Ritsu Doan	18	3	2018.09.11	2019.10.15
Koki Anzai	4	0	2019.03.22	2019.10.10
Yuya Osako	45	15	2013.07.21	2019.09.10
Ko Itakura	3	0	2019.06.20	2019.09.05
Tomoki Iwata	2	0	2019.06.20	2019.06.24
Daizen Maeda	2	0	2019.06.17	2019.06.24
Hiroki Abe	3	0	2019.06.17	2019.06.24
Daiki Sugioka	3	0	2019.06.17	2019.06.24
Koji Miyoshi	3	2	2019.06.17	2019.06.24
Yugo Tatsuta	1	0	2019.06.20	2019.06.20
Yuta Nakayama	1	0	2019.06.17	2019.06.17
Teruki Hara	1	0	2019.06.17	2019.06.17
Ryosuke Yamanaka	2	1	2018.11.20	2019.06.09
Daniel Schmidt	5	0	2018.11.16	2019.06.09
Yuki Kobayashi	8	1	2016.06.07	2019.06.09
Gen Shoji	18	1	2015.03.31	2019.06.09
Hidemasa Morita	3	0	2018.09.11	2019.06.05
Takashi Usami	27	3	2015.03.27	2019.03.26
Daigo Nishi	2	0	2011.06.01	2019.03.26
Takashi Inui	36	6	2009.01.20	2019.03.26
Masaaki Higashiguchi	8	0	2015.08.09	2019.03.22
Tsukasa Shiotani	7	1	2014.10.10	2019.02.01
Yoshinori Muto	29	3	2014.09.05	2019.02.01
Koya Kitagawa	8	0	2018.10.12	2019.01.24
Toshihiro Aoyama	12	1	2013.07.21	2019.01.17
Tomoaki Makino	38	4	2010.01.06	2019.01.17
Kento Misao	6	0	2017.12.16	2018.11.20
Kenyu Sugimoto	8	1	2017.09.05	2018.11.20
Kengo Kawamata	9	1	2015.03.27	2018.10.12
Jun Amano	1	0	2018.09.11	2018.09.11
Shintaro Kurumaya	4	0	2017.10.10	2018.09.11
Yu Kobayashi	14	2	2014.10.10	2018.09.11
Keisuke Honda	98	37	2008.06.22	2018.07.02
Makoto Hasebe	114	2	2006.02.10	2018.07.02
Gotoku Sakai	42	0	2012.09.06	2018.06.28
Yuya Kubo	13	2	2016.11.11	2018.03.27
Tomoya Ugajin	1	0	2018.03.23	2018.03.23
Ryota Morioka	5	0	2014.09.05	2018.03.23
Shoma Doi	2	0	2017.12.12	2017.12.16
Hiroyuki Abe	3	0	2017.12.09	2017.12.16
Shu Kurata	9	2	2015.08.05	2017.12.16
Yasuyuki Konno	93	4	2005.08.03	2017.12.16
Shuto Yamamoto	1	0	2017.12.12	2017.12.12
Shogo Taniguchi	3	0	2015.06.11	2017.12.09
Yojiro Takahagi	3	0	2013.07.21	2017.12.09
Mu Kanazaki	11	2	2009.01.20	2017.12.09
Kazuki Nagasawa	1	0	2017.11.14	2017.11.14
Masato Morishige	41	2	2013.07.21	2017.03.28
Hiroshi Kiyotake	43	5	2011.08.10	2017.03.28
Ryota Nagaki	1	0	2016.11.11	2016.11.11
Yuichi Maruyama	2	0	2016.10.11	2016.11.11
Manabu Saito	6	1	2013.07.21	2016.11.11
Yosuke Kashiwagi	11	0	2010.01.06	2016.10.16
Mike Havenaar	18	4	2011.09.02	2016.03.24
Hiroki Fujiharu	3	0	2015.03.27	2015.11.17
Daiki Niwa	2	0	2015.08.09	2015.10.13
Koki Yonekura	2	0	2015.08.09	2015.10.13
Shinzo Koroki	16	0	2008.10.09	2015.09.03
Yuki Muto	2	2	2015.08.02	2015.08.09
Naoyuki Fujita	1	0	2015.08.05	2015.08.05
Kosuke Ota	7	0	2010.01.06	2015.08.05
Atsuto Uchida	74	2	2008.01.26	2015.03.31
Hiroki Mizumoto	7	0	2006.10.04	2015.03.31
Yohei Toyoda	8	1	2013.07.25	2015.01.23
Yasuhito Endo	152	15	2002.11.20	2015.01.23
Taishi Taguchi	3	0	2014.10.10	2014.11.14
Daisuke Suzuki	2	0	2013.07.25	2014.10.14
Yoichiro Kakitani	18	5	2013.07.21	2014.10.14
Junya Tanaka	4	0	2012.02.24	2014.10.14
Hajime Hosogai	30	1	2009.10.08	2014.10.14
Yusuke Minagawa	1	0	2014.09.05	2014.09.05
Tatsuya Sakai	1	0	2014.09.05	2014.09.05
Yoshito Okubo	60	6	2003.05.31	2014.06.24
Masahiko Inoha	21	1	2011.01.17	2014.05.27
Masato Kudo	4	2	2013.07.21	2013.09.06
Yuichi Komano	78	1	2005.08.03	2013.08.14
Hiroki Yamada	2	0	2013.07.25	2013.07.28
Yuhei Tokunaga	9	0	2009.10.08	2013.07.28
Yuzo Kurihara	20	3	2006.08.09	2013.07.28
Takahiro Ogihara	1	0	2013.07.25	2013.07.25
Kazuhiko Chiba	1	0	2013.07.25	2013.07.25
Hideto Takahashi	7	0	2012.05.23	2013.07.25
Ryota Moriwaki	3	0	2011.06.01	2013.07.25
Ryoichi Maeda	33	10	2007.08.22	2013.06.22
Kengo Nakamura	68	6	2006.10.04	2013.06.22
Yuki Otsu	2	0	2013.02.06	2013.03.22
Ryo Miyaichi	2	0	2012.05.23	2012.10.16
Jungo Fujimoto	13	1	2007.03.24	2012.08.15
Takayuki Morimoto	10	3	2009.10.10	2012.05.23
Tadanari Lee	11	2	2011.01.09	2012.02.29
Naoya Kondo	1	0	2012.02.24	2012.02.24
Chikashi Masuda	1	0	2012.02.24	2012.02.24
Naohiro Ishikawa	6	0	2003.12.07	2012.02.24
Yuki Abe	53	3	2005.01.29	2011.10.07
Akihiro Ienaga	3	0	2007.03.24	2011.08.10
Kunimitsu Sekiguchi	3	0	2010.10.08	2011.06.07
Michihiro Yasuda	7	1	2008.02.17	2011.06.01
Daiki Iwamasa	8	0	2009.10.10	2011.01.29
Takuya Honda	2	0	2011.01.17	2011.01.25
Mitsuru Nagata	2	0	2010.09.07	2011.01.21
Daisuke Matsui	31	1	2003.06.22	2011.01.13
Hideo Hashimoto	15	0	2007.06.01	2010.09.07
Seigo Narazaki	77	0	1998.02.15	2010.09.07
Yuji Nakazawa	110	17	1999.09.08	2010.09.04
Marcus Tulio Tanaka	43	8	2006.08.09	2010.06.29
Keiji Tamada	72	16	2004.03.31	2010.06.29
Junichi Inamoto	82	5	2000.02.05	2010.06.24
Shunsuke Nakamura	98	24	2000.02.13	2010.06.19
Kisho Yano	19	2	2007.03.24	2010.06.14
Koji Yamase	13	5	2006.08.09	2010.04.07
Hisato Sato	31	4	2006.02.10	2010.02.14
Sota Hirayama	4	3	2010.01.06	2010.02.11
Mitsuo Ogasawara	55	7	2002.03.21	2010.02.11
Kazuma Watanabe	1	0	2010.01.06	2010.01.06
Takuji Yonemoto	1	0	2010.01.06	2010.01.06
Kazuya Yamamura	1	0	2010.01.06	2010.01.06
Naoya Kikuchi	1	0	2010.01.06	2010.01.06
Naoki Yamada	2	0	2009.05.27	2010.01.06
Ryota Tsuzuki	6	0	2001.06.04	2009.09.09
Satoshi Yamaguchi	2	0	2009.05.27	2009.05.31
Tatsuya Tanaka	16	3	2005.07.31	2009.03.28
Kazumichi Takagi	5	0	2008.08.20	2009.02.04
Seiichiro Maki	38	8	2005.07.31	2009.02.04
Shuhei Terada	6	0	2008.05.27	2009.01.28
Takeshi Aoki	2	0	2008.08.20	2009.01.20
Yoshikatsu Kawaguchi	116	0	1997.02.13	2008.11.19
Masashi Oguro	22	5	2005.01.29	2008.08.20
Shinji Ono	56	6	1998.04.01	2008.08.20
Keita Suzuki	28	0	2006.08.09	2008.05.27
Naohiro Takahara	57	23	2000.02.13	2008.05.27
Satoru Yamagishi	11	0	2006.10.04	2008.03.26
Yuzo Tashiro	3	0	2008.02.17	2008.02.23
Ryuji Bando	7	2	2006.10.04	2008.02.23
Akira Kaji	64	2	2003.10.08	2008.02.23
Naotake Hanyu	17	0	2006.08.16	2008.02.20
Daiki Takamatsu	2	0	2006.11.15	2007.08.22
Koki Mizuno	4	0	2007.03.24	2007.07.16
Koji Nakata	57	2	2000.02.05	2007.06.05
Keisuke Tsuboi	40	0	2003.06.11	2007.06.01
Kazuki Ganaha	6	3	2006.08.09	2006.11.15
Alessandro Santos	82	7	2002.03.21	2006.11.15
Takahiro Futagawa	1	0	2006.10.04	2006.10.04
Tsukasa Umesaki	1	0	2006.09.06	2006.09.06
Yuto Sato	1	0	2006.08.16	2006.08.16
Daisuke Sakata	1	0	2006.08.09	2006.08.09
Naoshi Nakamura	1	0	2006.08.09	2006.08.09
Daigo Kobayashi	1	0	2006.08.09	2006.08.09
Hayuma Tanaka	1	0	2006.08.09	2006.08.09
Hidetoshi Nakata	77	11	1997.05.21	2006.06.22
Tsuneyasu Miyamoto	71	3	2000.06.18	2006.06.18
Takashi Fukunishi	64	7	1999.06.29	2006.06.18
Atsushi Yanagisawa	58	17	1998.02.15	2006.06.18
Teruyuki Moniwa	9	1	2003.10.08	2006.06.12
Tatsuhiko Kubo	32	11	1998.10.28	2006.05.13
Shinji Murai	5	0	2005.08.03	2006.05.09
Makoto Tanaka	32	0	2004.04.25	2006.05.09
Masashi Motoyama	28	0	2000.06.18	2006.02.18
Yoshinobu Minowa	1	0	2005.10.12	2005.10.12
Takayuki Suzuki	55	11	2001.04.25	2005.10.12
Yoichi Doi	4	0	2004.02.07	2005.10.08
Takayuki Chano	7	0	2004.04.25	2005.08.07
Atsuhiro Miura	25	1	1999.06.06	2005.05.22
Naoki Matsuda	40	1	2000.02.05	2005.01.29
Toshiya Fujita	24	3	1995.02.15	2005.01.29
Takuya Yamada	4	0	2003.12.07	2004.08.18
Norihiro Nishi	5	0	2004.04.25	2004.08.03
Nobuhisa Yamada	15	1	2002.11.20	2004.02.18
Teruaki Kurobe	4	0	2003.03.28	2004.02.07
Daisuke Oku	26	2	1998.10.28	2004.02.07
Hitoshi Sogahata	4	0	2001.11.07	2003.09.10
Yuichiro Nagai	4	1	2003.04.16	2003.06.22
Ryuzo Morioka	38	0	1999.03.31	2003.06.08
Toshihiro Hattori	44	2	1996.09.11	2003.06.08
Yutaka Akita	44	4	1995.10.24	2003.06.08
Akira Narahashi	38	0	1994.09.27	2003.06.08
Masashi Nakayama	53	21	1990.07.31	2003.06.08
Yoshiteru Yamashita	3	0	2001.06.04	2003.04.16
Eisuke Nakanishi	14	0	1997.09.07	2002.11.20
Kazuyuki Toda	20	1	2001.05.31	2002.06.18
Tomokazu Myojin	26	3	2000.02.13	2002.06.18
Daisuke Ichikawa	10	0	1998.04.01	2002.06.18
Akinori Nishizawa	29	10	1997.05.21	2002.06.18
Hiroaki Morishima	64	12	1995.05.21	2002.06.18
Yasuhiro Hato	15	0	2001.04.25	2002.05.02
Teruyoshi Ito	27	0	1997.06.08	2001.11.07
Nozomi Hiroyama	2	0	2001.10.04	2001.10.07
Chikara Fujimoto	2	0	2001.07.01	2001.10.04
Kenichi Uemura	4	0	2001.04.25	2001.06.07
Hiroshi Nanami	67	9	1995.08.06	2001.04.25
Shigeyoshi Mochizuki	15	1	1997.06.15	2001.03.24
Shoji Jo	35	7	1995.09.20	2001.03.24
Tomoyuki Sakai	1	0	2000.12.20	2000.12.20
Hideaki Kitajima	3	1	2000.10.17	2000.12.20
Keiji Kaimoto	1	0	2000.10.20	2000.10.20
Daijiro Takakuwa	1	0	2000.10.20	2000.10.20
Go Oiwa	3	0	2000.02.05	2000.06.11
Yoshiharu Ueno	1	0	2000.06.06	2000.06.06
Kazuyoshi Miura	89	55	1990.09.26	2000.06.06
Hiromi Kojima	1	0	2000.04.26	2000.04.26
Takashi Hirano	15	4	1997.06.08	2000.02.20
Masaaki Sawanobori	16	3	1993.04.08	2000.02.20
Atsushi Yoneyama	1	0	2000.02.16	2000.02.16
Tomoyuki Hirase	2	0	2000.02.05	2000.02.13
Wagner Lopes	20	5	1997.09.28	1999.09.08
Naoki Soma	58	4	1995.05.28	1999.09.08
Masayuki Okano	25	2	1995.09.20	1999.07.05
Masami Ihara	122	5	1988.01.27	1999.07.05
Kota Yoshihara	1	0	1999.07.02	1999.07.02
Masahiro Ando	1	0	1999.07.02	1999.07.02
Toshihide Saito	17	0	1996.08.25	1999.07.02
Kazuaki Tasaka	7	0	1995.05.28	1999.06.29
Tsuyoshi Kitazawa	58	3	1991.06.02	1999.06.06
Takashi Shimoda	1	0	1999.03.31	1999.03.31
Norio Omura	30	4	1995.05.21	1998.06.26
Motohiro Yamaguchi	58	4	1995.01.06	1998.06.26
Tadatoshi Masuda	1	0	1998.02.15	1998.02.15
Tadashi Nakamura	16	0	1995.02.15	1998.02.15
Takuya Takagi	44	27	1992.05.31	1997.11.08
Yasuto Honda	29	1	1995.10.24	1997.10.26
Takeshi Watanabe	1	0	1997.08.13	1997.08.13
Ryuji Michiki	4	0	1996.10.13	1997.08.13
Hideto Suzuki	1	0	1997.06.28	1997.06.28
Yasuyuki Moriyama	1	0	1997.06.15	1997.06.15
Hiroshige Yanagimoto	30	0	1995.01.08	1997.03.27
Masakiyo Maezono	19	4	1994.05.22	1997.03.15
Hisashi Kurosaki	24	4	1989.05.05	1997.02.13
Kenichi Shimokawa	9	0	1995.06.10	1997.02.09
Naoki Sakai	1	0	1996.10.13	1996.10.13
Kazuya Maekawa	17	0	1992.06.07	1996.10.13
Yoshiyuki Hasegawa	6	0	1995.02.15	1996.05.29
Masaki Tsuchihashi	1	0	1996.05.26	1996.05.26
Nobuyuki Kojima	4	0	1995.06.06	1996.02.19
Hajime Moriyasu	35	1	1992.05.31	1996.02.19
Masaharu Suzuki	2	0	1995.10.24	1996.02.14
Kentaro Sawada	4	0	1995.09.20	1996.02.14
Shinkichi Kikuchi	7	0	1994.09.27	1995.10.28
Masahiro Fukuda	45	9	1990.07.27	1995.10.28
Tetsuji Hashiratani	72	6	1988.01.27	1995.10.28
Kentaro Hayashi	2	0	1995.08.06	1995.08.09
Ruy Ramos	32	1	1990.09.26	1995.08.09
Koji Noguchi	1	0	1995.08.06	1995.08.06
Katsuo Kanda	1	0	1995.05.28	1995.05.28
Kenta Hasegawa	27	4	1989.01.20	1995.02.26
Shigetatsu Matsunaga	40	0	1988.10.26	1995.02.26
Satoshi Tsunami	78	2	1980.12.22	1995.02.21
Hiromitsu Isogai	2	0	1995.01.06	1995.01.08
Toshihiro Yamaguchi	4	0	1994.07.08	1995.01.08
Yoshihiro Natsuka	11	1	1994.05.22	1995.01.08
Takumi Horiike	58	2	1986.08.01	1995.01.08
Yoshiro Moriyama	7	0	1994.07.08	1994.10.11
Masahiro Endo	8	0	1994.05.29	1994.10.11
Teruo Iwamoto	9	2	1994.05.22	1994.10.11
Takafumi Ogura	5	1	1994.05.22	1994.10.09
Nobuhiro Takeda	18	1	1987.04.08	1994.10.03
Naoto Otake	1	0	1994.09.27	1994.09.27
Takahiro Yamada	1	0	1994.09.27	1994.09.27
Kenji Honnami	3	0	1994.05.29	1994.07.14
Tetsuya Asano	8	1	1991.06.02	1994.07.14
Koji Kondo	2	0	1994.05.22	1994.05.29
Yoshiaki Sato	1	0	1994.05.22	1994.05.22
Mitsunori Yoshida	35	2	1988.06.02	1993.10.28
Toshinobu Katsuya	27	0	1985.09.22	1993.10.28
Yasutoshi Miura	3	0	1993.10.04	1993.10.18
Hiroshi Hirakawa	13	0	1985.03.21	1992.06.07
Yasuharu Sorimachi	4	0	1990.07.27	1991.07.27
Akihiro Nagashima	4	0	1990.07.27	1991.07.27
Yuji Sakakura	6	0	1990.07.27	1991.07.27
Masanao Sasaki	20	0	1988.06.02	1991.06.02
Shinichi Morishita	28	0	1985.06.04	1991.06.02
Shiro Kikuhara	5	0	1990.07.29	1990.10.01
Katsuyoshi Shinto	15	1	1987.05.27	1990.10.01
Toru Sano	9	0	1988.01.27	1990.09.28
Katsumi Oenoki	5	0	1989.05.05	1990.07.29
Shinichiro Tani	1	0	1990.07.27	1990.07.27
Atsushi Natori	6	0	1988.10.26	1989.07.23
Satoru Mochizuki	7	0	1988.01.27	1989.07.23
Yoshiyuki Matsuyama	10	4	1987.04.08	1989.07.23
Takashi Mizunuma	32	7	1984.04.18	1989.07.23
Tomoyuki Kajino	9	1	1988.06.02	1989.06.25
Osamu Maeda	14	6	1988.01.27	1989.06.18
Masaaki Mori	8	0	1988.06.02	1989.06.04
Tomoyasu Asaoka	8	0	1987.04.12	1989.05.05
Katsuhiro Kusaki	2	0	1988.01.27	1988.10.26
Hiromi Hara	75	37	1978.11.19	1988.10.26
Kiyotaka Matsui	15	0	1984.05.31	1988.06.02
Yuji Sugano	1	0	1988.02.02	1988.02.02
Satoshi Tezuka	25	2	1980.06.11	1988.02.02
Nobuyo Fujishiro	2	0	1988.01.27	1988.01.30
Akihiro Nishimura	49	2	1980.06.18	1988.01.30
Kuniharu Nakamoto	5	0	1987.09.02	1987.10.26
Hisashi Kato	61	6	1978.11.23	1987.10.26
Yasuhiko Okudera	32	9	1972.07.12	1987.10.26
Yasuharu Kurata	6	0	1986.09.20	1987.09.26
Toshio Matsuura	22	6	1981.06.02	1987.09.26
Kazuo Echigo	6	1	1986.07.25	1987.09.18
Hisashi Kaneko	7	1	1986.07.25	1987.09.18
Satoshi Miyauchi	20	0	1984.09.30	1987.09.18
Yasutaro Matsuki	11	0	1984.04.15	1986.09.28
Koichi Hashiratani	29	3	1981.02.08	1986.09.28
Kazushi Kimura	54	26	1979.05.31	1986.09.28
Yoshinori Ishigami	12	0	1984.09.30	1986.09.24
Osamu Taninaka	3	0	1984.09.30	1986.08.01
George Yonashiro	2	0	1985.10.26	1985.11.03
Tetsuya Totsuka	18	3	1980.12.22	1985.11.03
Takeshi Koshida	19	0	1980.12.22	1985.11.03
Yutaka Ikeuchi	8	0	1983.02.12	1985.08.11
Takeshi Okada	24	1	1980.06.09	1985.08.11
Shinobu Ikeda	1	0	1985.06.04	1985.06.04
Shinji Tanaka	17	0	1980.03.30	1985.06.04
Kazuaki Nagasawa	9	0	1978.07.13	1985.06.04
Masaru Uchiyama	1	0	1985.05.26	1985.05.26
Atsushi Uchiyama	2	0	1984.09.30	1985.02.23
Koji Tanaka	20	3	1982.07.15	1984.05.31
Nobutoshi Kaneda	58	6	1977.06.15	1984.05.31
Kazumi Tsubota	7	0	1981.03.08	1984.04.26
Kazuo Saito	32	0	1976.01.28	1984.04.26
Hideki Maeda	65	11	1975.08.04	1984.04.26
Hiroyuki Usui	38	15	1974.02.12	1984.04.26
Mitsuhisa Taguchi	59	0	1975.09.08	1984.04.21
Masafumi Yokoyama	31	10	1979.08.23	1984.04.18
Tetsuo Sugamata	23	0	1978.07.23	1984.04.15
Yahiro Kazama	19	0	1980.12.22	1983.09.25
Kazuo Ozaki	17	3	1981.02.08	1983.03.06
Hiroshi Yoshida	9	1	1981.02.08	1983.02.25
Toru Yoshikawa	1	0	1983.02.12	1983.02.12
Mitsugu Nomura	12	0	1981.06.02	1982.07.18
Ryoichi Kawakatsu	13	0	1981.02.08	1982.07.18
Masaaki Kato	3	1	1981.08.30	1981.09.08
Toshihiko Okimune	2	0	1981.08.30	1981.09.03
Naoji Ito	1	0	1981.06.19	1981.06.19
Shigemitsu Sudo	13	0	1979.08.23	1981.03.08
Haruhisa Hasegawa	15	4	1978.11.19	1981.03.08
Yoshio Kato	8	0	1980.06.09	1981.02.24
Tsutomu Sonobe	7	0	1978.05.23	1981.02.24
Satoshi Yamaguchi	1	0	1981.02.19	1981.02.19
Masakuni Yamamoto	4	0	1980.12.26	1981.02.19
Yasuhito Suzuki	4	0	1980.12.22	1980.12.30
Hiroyuki Sakashita	1	0	1980.12.28	1980.12.28
Takayoshi Yamano	2	0	1980.06.11	1980.06.18
Hiroshi Soejima	3	0	1980.06.09	1980.06.18
Kozo Tashima	7	1	1979.06.27	1980.06.18
Ikuo Takahara	4	2	1980.03.22	1980.04.02
Yuji Kishioku	10	2	1979.05.31	1980.04.02
Yukitaka Omi	6	0	1978.05.23	1980.04.02
Eijun Kiyokumo	42	0	1974.09.28	1980.04.02
Hiroshi Ochiai	63	9	1974.09.07	1980.04.02
Keizo Imai	29	0	1974.09.03	1980.04.02
Yoshikazu Nagai	69	9	1971.08.13	1980.03.30
Tatsuhiko Seta	25	0	1973.05.22	1980.03.22
Mitsuo Kato	1	0	1979.08.23	1979.08.23
Michio Yasuda	1	0	1979.08.23	1979.08.23
Nobuo Fujishima	65	7	1971.09.29	1979.08.23
Shigeharu Ueki	1	0	1979.07.13	1979.07.13
Katsuyuki Kawachi	3	0	1979.06.16	1979.07.13
Yoshiichi Watanabe	6	1	1979.06.16	1979.07.13
Shigemi Ishii	15	0	1974.02.12	1979.07.11
Kazuyoshi Nakamura	5	1	1979.03.04	1979.07.01
Mitsuo Watanabe	28	4	1974.02.12	1979.07.01
Mitsunori Fujiguchi	26	2	1972.07.12	1978.12.15
Atsuyoshi Furuta	32	0	1971.08.13	1978.12.15
Ichiro Hosotani	4	1	1978.07.13	1978.07.26
Hisao Sekiguchi	3	1	1978.05.23	1978.07.26
Akira Nishino	12	1	1977.03.06	1978.07.26
Toyohito Mochizuki	2	0	1978.07.21	1978.07.23
Choei Sato	1	0	1978.07.21	1978.07.21
Mitsuru Komaeda	2	2	1976.08.10	1977.06.15
Masaki Yokotani	20	0	1974.07.23	1977.06.15
Kozo Arai	47	4	1970.12.10	1977.06.15
Kunishige Kamamoto	76	75	1964.03.03	1977.06.15
Nobuo Kawakami	41	0	1970.07.31	1977.03.06
Kuniya Daini	44	0	1972.07.12	1976.12.04
Hiroji Imamura	4	0	1976.08.08	1976.08.22
Daishiro Yoshimura	46	7	1970.08.02	1976.08.22
Toshio Takabayashi	12	2	1974.02.12	1976.08.20
Akira Matsunaga	10	2	1973.05.22	1976.04.11
Takaji Mori	56	2	1966.12.16	1976.03.31
Aritatsu Ogi	62	11	1963.08.08	1976.03.17
Michio Ashikaga	7	0	1971.09.23	1975.09.08
Kazumi Takada	16	0	1970.12.12	1975.09.08
Koji Funamoto	19	0	1967.09.27	1975.09.08
Shusaku Hirasawa	11	1	1972.08.04	1974.09.28
Kenzo Yokoyama	49	0	1964.10.16	1974.09.28
Kazuhisa Kono	1	0	1974.02.20	1974.02.20
Noritaka Hidaka	4	0	1972.09.14	1973.06.23
Minoru Kobata	13	0	1970.07.31	1973.06.23
Yoshitada Yamaguchi	49	0	1964.10.16	1973.06.23
Seiichi Sakiya	3	0	1971.09.27	1972.08.06
George Kobayashi	3	0	1972.07.16	1972.07.22
Kiyoshi Tomizawa	9	2	1965.03.14	1971.10.02
Hiroshi Katayama	38	0	1961.08.02	1971.10.02
Teruki Miyamoto	58	19	1961.06.11	1971.10.02
Ryuichi Sugiyama	56	15	1961.05.28	1971.10.02
Masakatsu Miyamoto	44	1	1958.12.25	1971.10.02
Tadahiko Ueda	13	7	1970.08.02	1971.09.23
Yoshio Kikugawa	16	0	1969.10.12	1971.08.13
Takeshi Ono	3	0	1965.03.25	1971.08.13
Teruo Nimura	5	0	1970.12.10	1970.12.19
Eizo Yuguchi	5	1	1969.10.18	1970.12.18
Takeo Kimura	14	4	1966.12.17	1970.12.18
Masafumi Hara	5	0	1970.07.31	1970.12.17
Yusuke Omi	5	1	1970.08.04	1970.12.16
Norio Yoshimizu	4	1	1970.07.31	1970.08.16
Yasuyuki Kuwahara	12	5	1966.12.14	1970.07.31
Tsuyoshi Kunieda	2	0	1969.10.16	1969.10.18
Masashi Watanabe	39	12	1958.12.25	1969.10.18
Mitsuo Kamata	44	2	1958.12.25	1969.10.18
Junji Kawano	2	0	1968.03.31	1969.10.16
Ikuo Matsumoto	11	1	1966.12.10	1969.10.16
Tadao Onishi	1	0	1969.10.10	1969.10.10
Shigeo Yaegashi	45	11	1956.06.03	1968.10.14
Ryozo Suzuki	24	0	1961.08.15	1968.04.04
Hisao Kami	15	0	1964.10.16	1968.03.31
Masahiro Hamazaki	2	0	1966.12.16	1966.12.19
Kazuo Imanishi	3	0	1966.12.10	1966.12.18
Shozo Tsugitani	12	4	1961.08.15	1965.03.27
Masanobu Izumi	1	0	1965.03.25	1965.03.25
Katsuyoshi Kuwahara	2	0	1965.03.22	1965.03.25
Saburo Kawabuchi	26	8	1958.12.25	1965.03.22
Nobuyuki Oishi	1	0	1964.03.03	1964.03.03
Takao Nishiyama	1	0	1964.03.03	1964.03.03
Tsukasa Hosaka	19	0	1960.11.06	1964.03.03
Michihiro Ozawa	36	0	1956.06.03	1964.03.03
Yasuo Takamori	30	0	1955.01.02	1963.08.15
Yoshinobu Ishii	1	0	1962.09.21	1962.09.21
Takayuki Kuwata	5	2	1961.05.28	1962.09.21
Takehiko Kawanishi	8	0	1959.12.20	1962.09.21
Yoshio Furukawa	19	0	1956.06.03	1962.09.21
Masao Uchino	18	3	1955.01.02	1962.09.12
Ryuzo Hiraki	30	1	1954.03.14	1962.09.12
Ken Naganuma	4	1	1954.03.07	1961.11.28
Hiroshi Saeki	4	0	1958.12.25	1961.08.15
Koji Sasaki	14	1	1958.12.25	1961.08.10
Kenji Tochio	2	0	1961.05.28	1961.06.11
Tatsuya Shiji	1	1	1961.05.28	1961.05.28
Hiroshi Ninomiya	12	9	1958.12.25	1961.05.28
Akira Kitaguchi	10	1	1958.05.26	1959.12.13
Masanori Tokita	12	2	1951.03.07	1959.09.05
Seishiro Shimatani	1	0	1959.01.11	1959.01.11
Hiroaki Sato	15	0	1955.01.02	1959.01.11
Gyoji Matsumoto	1	0	1958.12.28	1958.12.28
Yoshinori Shigematsu	1	0	1958.05.28	1958.05.28
Waichiro Omura	5	0	1956.06.03	1958.05.28
Isao Iwabuchi	8	2	1955.01.05	1958.05.28
Takashi Takabayashi	9	2	1954.03.14	1958.05.28
Kenzo Ohashi	1	0	1958.05.26	1958.05.26
Tadao Kobayashi	3	0	1956.06.03	1956.11.27
Toshio Iwatani	8	4	1951.03.07	1956.06.10
Yukio Shimomura	1	0	1955.10.09	1955.10.09
Takashi Tokuhiro	1	0	1955.10.09	1955.10.09
Reizo Fukuhara	2	0	1955.01.05	1955.10.09
Hisataka Okamoto	5	0	1955.01.02	1955.10.09
Tomohiko Ikoma	5	0	1955.01.02	1955.10.09
Nobuo Matsunaga	4	0	1954.03.14	1955.10.09
Arawa Kimura	6	1	1954.03.07	1955.10.09
Shunichiro Okano	2	0	1955.01.02	1955.01.11
Yasukazu Tanaka	4	0	1955.01.02	1955.01.11
Kakuichi Mimura	4	0	1955.01.02	1955.01.11
Yozo Aoki	1	0	1955.01.05	1955.01.05
Hidemaro Watanabe	2	0	1954.03.14	1954.05.03
Masao Ono	3	0	1954.03.14	1954.05.03
Koji Miyata	6	0	1951.03.07	1954.05.03
Yoshio Okada	7	0	1951.03.07	1954.05.03
Takashi Kano	7	2	1951.03.07	1954.05.03
Hirokazu Ninomiya	6	1	1940.06.16	1954.05.03
Taizo Kawamoto	9	4	1934.05.13	1954.05.03
Hiroto Muraoka	2	0	1954.03.07	1954.05.01
Taro Kagawa	5	0	1951.03.07	1954.05.01
Takeshi Inoue	1	0	1954.03.07	1954.03.07
Osamu Yamaji	1	0	1954.03.07	1954.03.07
Shigeo Sugimoto	3	0	1951.03.07	1954.03.07
Seki Matsunaga	1	0	1951.03.09	1951.03.09
Ken Noritake	1	0	1951.03.09	1951.03.09
Nobuyuki Kato	1	0	1951.03.09	1951.03.09
Ko Arima	3	0	1951.03.07	1951.03.09
Megumu Tamura	3	0	1951.03.07	1951.03.09
Yukio Tsuda	4	0	1940.06.16	1951.03.09
Kim Sung-gan	1	0	1940.06.16	1940.06.16
Kazu Naoki	1	0	1940.06.16	1940.06.16
Saburo Shinosaki	1	0	1940.06.16	1940.06.16
Takashi Kasahara	1	0	1940.06.16	1940.06.16
Lee Yoo-hyung	1	0	1940.06.16	1940.06.16
Kunitaka Sueoka	1	0	1940.06.16	1940.06.16
Kim Yong-sik	3	0	1936.08.04	1940.06.16
Tokutaro Ukon	5	1	1934.05.15	1940.06.16
Shogo Kamo	2	0	1936.08.04	1936.08.07
Takeshi Kamo	2	0	1936.08.04	1936.08.07
Koichi Oita	2	0	1936.08.04	1936.08.07
Rihei Sano	2	0	1936.08.04	1936.08.07
Akira Matsunaga	2	1	1936.08.04	1936.08.07
Yasuo Suzuki	2	0	1934.05.15	1936.08.07
Motoo Tatsuhara	4	0	1934.05.13	1936.08.07
Teizo Takeuchi	4	0	1930.05.25	1936.08.07
Tadao Horie	3	0	1934.05.15	1936.08.04
Takeshi Natori	1	1	1934.05.20	1934.05.20
Shunichi Kumai	2	0	1934.05.13	1934.05.20
Teiichi Matsumaru	3	0	1934.05.13	1934.05.20
Takashi Kawanishi	3	0	1934.05.13	1934.05.20
Hideo Sakai	3	0	1934.05.13	1934.05.20
Shiro Misaki	3	0	1934.05.13	1934.05.20
Ichiji Otani	3	1	1934.05.13	1934.05.20
Akira Nozawa	3	3	1934.05.13	1934.05.20
Yukio Goto	4	0	1930.05.25	1934.05.20
Teruo Abe	2	0	1934.05.13	1934.05.15
Hiroshi Kanazawa	2	0	1934.05.13	1934.05.15
Shoichi Nishimura	2	1	1934.05.13	1934.05.15
Masao Nozawa	2	0	1930.05.25	1930.05.29
Saizo Saito	2	0	1930.05.25	1930.05.29
Tokizo Ichihashi	2	1	1930.05.25	1930.05.29
Tadao Takayama	2	1	1930.05.25	1930.05.29
Hideo Shinojima	2	1	1930.05.25	1930.05.29
Shiro Teshima	2	2	1930.05.25	1930.05.29
Takeo Wakabayashi	2	4	1930.05.25	1930.05.29
Yasuo Haruyama	4	0	1927.08.27	1930.05.29
Nagayasu Honda	4	0	1927.08.27	1930.05.29
Shigemaru Takenokoshi	5	1	1925.05.20	1930.05.29
Tameo Ide	1	0	1930.05.25	1930.05.25
Michiyo Taki	1	0	1927.08.29	1927.08.29
Shigeru Takahashi	2	0	1927.08.27	1927.08.29
Tamotsu Asakura	2	0	1927.08.27	1927.08.29
Haruo Arima	2	0	1927.08.27	1927.08.29
Ko Takamoro	2	0	1927.08.27	1927.08.29
Daigoro Kondo	2	0	1927.08.27	1927.08.29
Junji Nishikawa	2	0	1927.08.27	1927.08.29
Misao Tamai	2	1	1927.08.27	1927.08.29
Shigeyoshi Suzuki	2	1	1927.08.27	1927.08.29
Shojiro Sugimura	1	0	1927.08.27	1927.08.27
Kinjiro Shimizu	1	0	1925.05.20	1925.05.20
Kiyonosuke Marutani	1	0	1925.05.20	1925.05.20
Sakae Takahashi	1	0	1925.05.20	1925.05.20
Masuzo Madono	2	0	1925.05.17	1925.05.20
Masao Takada	2	0	1925.05.17	1925.05.20
Sachi Kagawa	2	0	1925.05.17	1925.05.20
Jiro Miyake	2	0	1925.05.17	1925.05.20
Hifuyo Uchida	2	0	1925.05.17	1925.05.20
Uichiro Hatta	2	0	1925.05.17	1925.05.20
Toshio Miyaji	2	0	1925.05.17	1925.05.20
Yoshimatsu Oyama	2	0	1925.05.17	1925.05.20
Yanosuke Watanabe	2	0	1925.05.17	1925.05.20
Kiyoo Kanda	4	0	1923.05.23	1925.05.20
Shiro Azumi	3	0	1923.05.23	1925.05.17
Shumpei Inoue	1	0	1923.05.24	1923.05.24
Kikuzo Kisaka	2	0	1923.05.23	1923.05.24
Setsu Sawagata	2	0	1923.05.23	1923.05.24
Toshio Hirabayashi	2	0	1923.05.23	1923.05.24
Shizuo Miyama	2	0	1923.05.23	1923.05.24
Usaburo Hidaka	2	0	1923.05.23	1923.05.24
Fukusaburo Harada	2	0	1923.05.23	1923.05.24
Ryuzo Shimizu	2	1	1923.05.23	1923.05.24
Naoemon Shimizu	2	1	1923.05.23	1923.05.24
Yoshio Fujiwara	1	0	1923.05.23	1923.05.23

== See also ==
- List of Japan international footballers born outside Japan
