= 1925 in Japanese football =

1925 season

Japanese football in 1925.

== Emperor's Cup ==
November 2, 1925

Rijo Shukyu-Dan	3–0	Tokyo Imperial University
? ?' ? ?' ? ?'

Meiji Jingu Gaien Stadium

== National team ==
=== Results ===
1925.05.17	Japan	0–4	Philippines	Manila, Philippines
		JFA	? ?' ? ?' ? ?' ? ?'

1925.05.20	Japan	0–2	Republic of China	Manila, Philippines
		JFA	? ?' ? ?'

=== Players statistics ===
Player	-1924	05.17	05.20	1925	Total
Kiyoo Kanda	2(0)	O	O	2(0)	4(0)
Shiro Azumi	2(0)	O	-	1(0)	3(0)
Yanosuke Watanabe	0(0)	O	O	2(0)	2(0)
Yoshimatsu Oyama	0(0)	O	O	2(0)	2(0)
Toshio Miyaji	0(0)	O	O	2(0)	2(0)
Uichiro Hatta	0(0)	O	O	2(0)	2(0)
Masuzo Madono	0(0)	O	O	2(0)	2(0)
Hifuyo Uchida	0(0)	O	O	2(0)	2(0)
Jiro Miyake	0(0)	O	O	2(0)	2(0)
Sachi Kagawa	0(0)	O	O	2(0)	2(0)
Masao Takada	0(0)	O	O	2(0)	2(0)
Sakae Takahashi	0(0)	-	O	1(0)	1(0)
Shigemaru Takenokoshi	0(0)	-	O	1(0)	1(0)
Kiyonosuke Marutani	0(0)	-	O	1(0)	1(0)
Kinjiro Shimizu	0(0)	-	O	1(0)	1(0)

== Births ==
- June 24 - Masanori Tokita
- October 24 - Toshio Iwatani
