= 1927 in Japanese football =

1927 season

Japanese football in 1927.

== Emperor's Cup ==
October 30, 1927

| Kobe Icchu Club | 2–0 | Rijo Shukyu-Dan |
|---|---|---|
| ? ?' ? ?' |

Meiji Jingu Gaien Stadium

== National team ==
=== Results ===
| 1927.08.27 | Japan | 1–5 | Republic of China | Shanghai, China |
| | Tamai 41' | JFA | ? ?' ? ?' ? ?' ? ?' ? ?' |

| 1927.08.29 | Japan | 2–1 | Philippines | Shanghai, China |
| | Suzuki 70'; Takenokoshi 75' | JFA | ? ?' |

=== Players statistics ===
| Player | -1926 | 08.27 | 08.29 | 1927 | Total |
| Shigemaru Takenokoshi | 1(0) | O | O(1) | 2(1) | 3(1) |
| Misao Tamai | 0(0) | O(1) | O | 2(1) | 2(1) |
| Shigeyoshi Suzuki | 0(0) | O | O(1) | 2(1) | 2(1) |
| Nagayasu Honda | 0(0) | O | O | 2(0) | 2(0) |
| Daigoro Kondo | 0(0) | O | O | 2(0) | 2(0) |
| Ko Takamoro | 0(0) | O | O | 2(0) | 2(0) |
| Haruo Arima | 0(0) | O | O | 2(0) | 2(0) |
| Tamotsu Asakura | 0(0) | O | O | 2(0) | 2(0) |
| Yasuo Haruyama | 0(0) | O | O | 2(0) | 2(0) |
| Shigeru Takahashi | 0(0) | O | O | 2(0) | 2(0) |
| Junji Nishikawa | 0(0) | O | O | 2(0) | 2(0) |
| Shojiro Sugimura | 0(0) | O | - | 1(0) | 1(0) |
| Michiyo Taki | 0(0) | - | O | 1(0) | 1(0) |

== Births ==
- January 10 - Megumu Tamura
