= 1923 in Japanese football =

1923 season

Japanese football in 1923.

== Emperor's Cup ==
February 3, 1924

Astra Club	2–1	Nagoya Shukyu-Dan
? ?' ? ?'		? ?'

Tokyo Koto-Shihan Ground

== National team ==
=== Results ===
1923.05.23	Japan	1–2	Philippines	Osaka, Japan
	R. Shimizu 5'	JFA	? ?' ? ?'	Stadium: Osaka City Ground

1923.05.24	Japan	1–5	Republic of China	Osaka, Japan
	N. Shimizu 15'	JFA	? ?' ? ?' ? ?' ? ?' ? ?'	Stadium: Osaka City Ground

=== Players statistics ===
Player	-1922	05.23	05.24	1923	Total
Ryuzo Shimizu	0(0)	O(1)	O	2(1)	2(1)
Naoemon Shimizu	0(0)	O	O(1)	2(1)	2(1)
Fukusaburo Harada	0(0)	O	O	2(0)	2(0)
Usaburo Hidaka	0(0)	O	O	2(0)	2(0)
Shizuo Miyama	0(0)	O	O	2(0)	2(0)
Toshio Hirabayashi	0(0)	O	O	2(0)	2(0)
Kiyoo Kanda	0(0)	O	O	2(0)	2(0)
Setsu Sawagata	0(0)	O	O	2(0)	2(0)
Kikuzo Kisaka	0(0)	O	O	2(0)	2(0)
Shiro Azumi	0(0)	O	O	2(0)	2(0)
Yoshio Fujiwara	0(0)	O	-	1(0)	1(0)
Shumpei Inoue	0(0)	-	O	1(0)	1(0)

== Births ==
- January 15 - Koji Miyata
- March 2 - Masao Ono
