= Nagayasu Honda =

Japanese footballer

Nagayasu Honda 本田 長康
Personal information
- Full name: Nagayasu Honda
- Place of birth: Empire of Japan
- Position: Midfielder

Youth career
- Waseda University High School
- Waseda University

Senior career*
Years	Team	Apps	(Gls)
- Waseda WMW

International career
1927–1930	Japan	4	(0)
Medal record
Waseda WMW
Winner	Emperor's Cup	1928
- * Club domestic league appearances and goals

Nagayasu Honda (本田 長康, Honda Nagayasu) was a Japanese football player. He played for Japan national team.

== Club career ==
Honda played for Waseda WMW was consisted of his alma mater Waseda University players and graduates. At the club, he played with many Japan national team players Shigeyoshi Suzuki, Haruo Arima, Misao Tamai, Tamotsu Asakura, Shigeru Takahashi, Shojiro Sugimura, Ko Takamoro, Michiyo Taki and Tameo Ide. He won 1928 Emperor's Cup at the club.

== National team career ==
In August 1927, when Honda was a Waseda University Senior High School student, he was selected Japan national team for 1927 Far Eastern Championship Games in Shanghai. At this competition, on August 27, he debuted against Republic of China. On August 29, he also played against Philippines, and Japan won this match. This is Japan national team first victory in International A Match. He also played at 1930 Far Eastern Championship Games in Tokyo and Japan won the championship. He played 4 games for Japan until 1930.

== National team statistics ==
Japan national team
Year	Apps	Goals
1927	2	0
1928	0	0
1929	0	0
1930	2	0
Total	4	0
