= Ko Takamoro =

Japanese footballer

Ko Takamoro 高師 康
Personal information
- Full name: Ko Takamoro
- Date of birth: November 9, 1907
- Place of birth: Saitama, Saitama, Empire of Japan
- Date of death: March 26, 1995 (aged 87)
- Place of death: Japan
- Height: 1.67 m (5 ft 5 1/2 in)
- Position: Defender

Youth career
- Waseda University High School
- ????–1930: Waseda University

Senior career*
Years	Team	Apps	(Gls)
- Saitama Shukyu-Dan
- Waseda WMW

International career
1927	Japan	2	(0)
Medal record
Waseda WMW
Winner	Emperor's Cup	1928
- * Club domestic league appearances and goals

Ko Takamoro (高師 康, Takamoro Ko; November 9, 1907 – March 26, 1995) was a Japanese football player. He played for Japan national team.

== Club career ==
Takamoro was born in Saitama on November 9, 1907. He played for Saitama Shukyu-Dan and Waseda WMW was consisted of his alma mater Waseda University players and graduates. At the club, he played with many Japan national team players Shigeyoshi Suzuki, Haruo Arima, Misao Tamai, Tamotsu Asakura, Shigeru Takahashi, Shojiro Sugimura, Nagayasu Honda and Michiyo Taki. He won 1928 Emperor's Cup.

== National team career ==
In August 1927, when Takamoro was a Waseda University Senior High School student, he was selected Japan national team for 1927 Far Eastern Championship Games in Shanghai. At this competition, on August 27, he debuted against Republic of China. On August 29, he also played against Philippines and Japan won this match. This is Japan national team first victory in International A Match. He played 2 games for Japan in 1927.

== After retirement ==
After retirement, Takamoro worked at Asahi Shimbun from 1936 to 1962.

Takamoro died on March 26, 1995, at the age of 87.

== National team statistics ==
Japan national team
Year	Apps	Goals
1927	2	0
Total	2	0
