= Shiro Azumi =

Japanese footballer

Shiro Azumi 安積 四郎
Personal information
- Full name: Shiro Azumi
- Place of birth: Empire of Japan
- Position: Forward

Youth career
- Meisei Commercial High School

Senior career*
| Years | Team | Apps | (Gls) |
- Osaka SC

International career
| 1923–1925 | Japan | 3 | (0) |
- * Club domestic league appearances and goals

Shiro Azumi (安積 四郎, Azumi Shiro) was a Japanese football player. He played for the Japan national team.

== Club career ==
After graduating from high school, Azumi played for Osaka SC was founded by his alma mater high school graduates and many Japan national team players Kiyoo Kanda, Fukusaburo Harada, Usaburo Hidaka, Toshio Hirabayashi, Setsu Sawagata, Kikuzo Kisaka, Yoshio Fujiwara, Shumpei Inoue, Yoshimatsu Oyama, Toshio Miyaji, Uichiro Hatta, Sakae Takahashi and Kiyonosuke Marutani were playing in those days.

== National team career ==
In May 1923, Azumi was selected Japan national team for 1923 Far Eastern Championship Games in Osaka. At this competition, on May 23, he debuted against Philippines. This match is Japan team first match in International A Match. He also played at 1925 Far Eastern Championship Games in Manila. He played 3 games for Japan until 1925. But Japan lost in both matches.

== National team statistics ==
Japan national team
| Year | Apps | Goals |
|---|---|---|
| 1923 | 2 | 0 |
| 1924 | 0 | 0 |
| 1925 | 1 | 0 |
| Total | 3 | 0 |
