= Kiyoo Kanda =

Japanese footballer

Kiyoo Kanda 神田 清雄
Personal information
- Full name: Kiyoo Kanda
- Place of birth: Osaka City, Empire of Japan
- Date of death: May 9, 1970
- Place of death: Japan
- Position: Midfielder

Youth career
- Meisei Commercial High School
- Doshisha University

Senior career*
Years	Team	Apps	(Gls)
- Osaka SC

International career
1923–1925	Japan	4	(0)
- * Club domestic league appearances and goals

Kiyoo Kanda (神田 清雄, Kanda Kiyoo; ? – May 9, 1970) was a Japanese football player. He played for Japan national team.

== Club career ==
Kanda played for Osaka SC was founded by his alma mater high school graduates and many Japan national team players Shiro Azumi, Fukusaburo Harada, Usaburo Hidaka, Toshio Hirabayashi, Setsu Sawagata, Kikuzo Kisaka, Yoshio Fujiwara, Shumpei Inoue, Yoshimatsu Oyama, Toshio Miyaji, Uichiro Hatta, Sakae Takahashi and Kiyonosuke Marutani were playing in those days.

== National team career ==
In May 1923, Kanda was selected Japan national team for 1923 Far Eastern Championship Games in Osaka. At this competition, on May 23, he debuted against Philippines. This match is Japan team first match in International A Match. He also played at 1925 Far Eastern Championship Games in Manila. He played 4 games for Japan until 1925. But Japan lost in both matches.

Kanda died on May 9, 1970.

== National team statistics ==
Japan national team
Year	Apps	Goals
1923	2	0
1924	0	0
1925	2	0
Total	4	0
