= Shojiro Sugimura =

Japanese footballer

Shojiro Sugimura 杉村 正二郎
Personal information
- Full name: Shojiro Sugimura
- Date of birth: April 4, 1905
- Place of birth: Osaka, Osaka, Empire of Japan
- Date of death: January 15, 1975 (aged 69)
- Place of death: Bunkyo, Tokyo, Japan
- Position: Midfielder

Youth career
- ????: Tennoji High School
- ????–1929: Waseda University

Senior career*
Years	Team	Apps	(Gls)
- Waseda WMW

International career
1927	Japan	1	(0)
- * Club domestic league appearances and goals

Shojiro Sugimura (杉村 正二郎, Sugimura Shojiro; April 4, 1905 – January 15, 1975) was a Japanese football player. He played for Japan national team. He is sometimes known as Shojiro Nomura (野村 正二郎).

== Club career ==
Sugimura was born in Osaka on April 4, 1905. He played for Waseda WMW was consisted of his alma mater Waseda University players and graduates. At the club, he played with many Japan national team players Shigeyoshi Suzuki, Haruo Arima, Misao Tamai, Tamotsu Asakura, Shigeru Takahashi, Nagayasu Honda, Ko Takamoro and Michiyo Taki.

== National team career ==
In August 1927, when Sugimura was a Waseda University student, he was selected Japan national team for 1927 Far Eastern Championship Games in Shanghai. At this competition, on August 27, he debuted against Republic of China.

== After retirement ==
After retirement, Sugimura joined Japan Football Association and served as a director. He also worked Ministry of Education, Science and Culture and taught as professor at Sophia University.

On January 15, 1975, Sugimura died of myocardial infarction in Bunkyo, Tokyo at the age of 69.

== National team statistics ==
Japan national team
Year	Apps	Goals
1927	1	0
Total	1	0
