= Shigeyoshi Suzuki =

Japanese footballer and manager

Shigeyoshi Suzuki 鈴木 重義
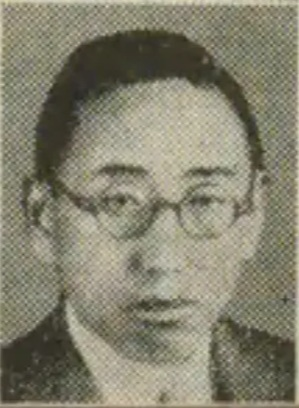
- Shigeyoshi Suzuki, July 1936

Personal information
- Full name: Shigeyoshi Suzuki
- Date of birth: October 13, 1902
- Place of birth: Fukushima, Empire of Japan
- Date of death: December 20, 1971 (aged 69)
- Place of death: Japan
- Position: Forward

Youth career
- 1920–1922: Waseda University High School

College career
Years	Team	Apps	(Gls)
1923–1926	Waseda University		

Senior career*
Years	Team	Apps	(Gls)
- Waseda WMW

International career
1927	Japan	2	(1)

Managerial career
- 1930: Japan
- 1936: Japan
- * Club domestic league appearances and goals

Shigeyoshi Suzuki (鈴木 重義, Suzuki Shigeyoshi; October 13, 1902 – December 20, 1971) was a Japanese football player who played for and later managed the Japan national team.

== Club career ==
Suzuki was born in Fukushima Prefecture on October 13, 1902. He was a founding member of the football team at Waseda University High School in 1921, and a founding member of the Waseda University football team in 1924. At Waseda, he played with many Japan national team players including Haruo Arima, Misao Tamai, Tamotsu Asakura, Shigeru Takahashi, Shojiro Sugimura, Nagayasu Honda, Ko Takamoro and Michiyo Taki.

== National team career ==
In August 1927, Suzuki was selected for the Japan national team at the 1927 Far Eastern Championship Games in Shanghai. At this competition, on August 27, he debuted as captain against the Republic of China. On August 29, he also played and scored a goal against the Philippines, and Japan won this match, its first victory in an International A Match. Suzuki played 2 games and scored 1 goal for Japan in 1927.

== Coaching career ==
In 1930, Suzuki became manager for Japan national team for 1930 Far Eastern Championship Games in Tokyo. He led Japan to the champions. In 1936, he became manager for Japan again and managed at 1936 Summer Olympics in Berlin. Japan completed a come-from-behind victory against Sweden. The first victory in Olympics for the Japan and the historic victory over one of the powerhouses became later known as "Miracle of Berlin" (ベルリンの奇跡) in Japan. In 2016, this team was selected to the Japan Football Hall of Fame.

After World War II, Suzuki became an executive in the insurance industry. He died on December 20, 1971, at the age of 69. In 2007, he was selected to the Japan Football Hall of Fame.

== National team statistics ==
Japan national team
Year	Apps	Goals
1927	2	1
Total	2	1

== Honours ==
- Japan Football Hall of Fame: Inducted in 2007
