= Haruo Arima =

Japanese footballer

Haruo Arima 有馬 暎夫
Personal information
- Full name: Haruo Arima
- Place of birth: Empire of Japan
- Position: Midfielder

Youth career
- Waseda University

Senior career*
Years	Team	Apps	(Gls)
- Waseda WMW

International career
1927	Japan	2	(0)
- * Club domestic league appearances and goals

Haruo Arima (有馬 暎夫, Arima Haruo) was a Japanese football player. He played for the Japan national team.

== Club career ==
Arima played for Waseda WMW was consisted of his alma mater Waseda University players and graduates. At the club, he played with many Japan national team players Shigeyoshi Suzuki, Misao Tamai, Tamotsu Asakura, Shigeru Takahashi, Shojiro Sugimura, Nagayasu Honda, Ko Takamoro and Michiyo Taki.

== National team career ==
In August 1927, Arima was selected Japan national team for 1927 Far Eastern Championship Games in Shanghai. At this competition, on August 27, he debuted against Republic of China. On August 29, he also played against Philippines and Japan won this match. This is Japan national team first victory in International A Match. He played 2 games for Japan in 1927.

== National team statistics ==
Japan national team
Year	Apps	Goals
1927	2	0
Total	2	0
