= Masuzō =

- Gender: Male

Origin
- Origin: Japanese
- Meaning: Different meanings depending on the kanji used

Masuzō, Masuzo or Masuzou (written: 益三) is a masculine Japanese given name. Notable people with the name include:

- Masuzo Madono, Japanese footballer
- Masuzo Shikata (志方 益三) (1895–1964), Japanese chemist
