= Misao Tamai =

Japanese footballer

Misao Tamai 玉井 操
Personal information
- Full name: Misao Tamai
- Date of birth: December 16, 1903
- Place of birth: Hyogo, Empire of Japan
- Date of death: December 23, 1978 (aged 75)
- Place of death: Kobe, Hyogo, Japan
- Position: Forward

Youth career
- 1919–1921: Meiji Gakuin High School
- 1922–1927: Waseda University

Senior career*
Years	Team	Apps	(Gls)
- Waseda WMW

International career
1927	Japan	2	(1)
- * Club domestic league appearances and goals

Misao Tamai (玉井 操, Tamai Misao; December 16, 1903 – December 23, 1978) was a Japanese football player.

== Club career ==
Tamai was born in Hyogo Prefecture on December 16, 1903. He played for Waseda WMW was consisted of his alma mater Waseda University players and graduates. At the club, he played with many Japan national team players Shigeyoshi Suzuki, Haruo Arima, Tamotsu Asakura, Shigeru Takahashi, Shojiro Sugimura, Nagayasu Honda, Ko Takamoro and Michiyo Taki.

== National team career ==
In August 1927, when Tamai was a Waseda University student, he was selected Japan national team for 1927 Far Eastern Championship Games in Shanghai. At this competition, on August 27, he debuted and scored a goal against Republic of China. On August 29, he also played against Philippines and Japan won this match. This is Japan national team first victory in International A Match. He played 2 games and scored 1 goal for Japan in 1927.

== After retirement ==
After retirement, Tamai became a vice-president of Japan Football Association from 1957 to 1976.

On December 23, 1978, Tamai died of heart failure in Kobe at the age of 75. In 2006, he was selected Japan Football Hall of Fame.

== National team statistics ==
Japan national team
Year	Apps	Goals
1927	2	1
Total	2	1

== Honours ==
- Japan Football Hall of Fame: Inducted in 2006
