= Hidaka =

Hidaka (Japanese: 日高 sun-tall) may refer to:

== People ==
- Hidaka (surname)
- Princess Hidaka, birth name of Empress Genshō

== Places in Japan ==
=== Populated places ===
- Hidaka, Saitama, a city in Saitama Prefecture
- Hidaka, Kōchi, a village in Kochi Prefecture
- Hidaka, Hyōgo, a former town in Hyōgo Prefecture
- Hidaka, Wakayama, a town in Hidaka District in Wakayama Prefecture
- Hidaka, Hokkaidō, a town in Hidaka Subprefecture, Hokkaidō

=== Administrative divisions ===
- Hidaka District, Wakayama in Wakayama Prefecture
- Hidaka District, Hokkaidō, a district in Hidaka Subprefecture, Hokkaidō
- Hidaka Subprefecture, a subprefecture of Hokkaidō

=== Geographic features ===
- Hidaka Mountains, a mountain range in Hokkaidō
- Hidaka Pass, a mountain pass in the Hidaka Mountains
