= Oita =

Oita often refers to:

- Ōita Prefecture, Kyushu, Japan
- Ōita (city), the capital of the prefecture

Oita or Ōita may also refer to:

== Places ==
- Ōita District, Ōita, a former district in Ōita Prefecture, Japan
- Ōita Stadium, a multi-use stadium in Ōita, Ōita Prefecture, Japan
- Oița River, a tributary of the Bistriţa River in Romania
- Mount Oeta (also "Oita" or "Oiti"), a mountain in Central Greece

== Transportation ==
- Oita Airport, an airport in Kunisaki, Ōita Prefecture, Japan
- Ōita Station, a JR Kyūshū train station in Ōita, Ōita Prefecture, Japan

== People ==
- Koichi Oita (1914–1996), former Japanese football (soccer) player and manager

== Sports and entertainment ==
- Oita Miyoshi Weisse Adler, a men's volleyball team based in Ōita, Ōita Prefecture, Japan
- Oita Trinita, a J. League football (soccer) team in Ōita, Ōita Prefecture, Japan

== Biology ==
- Oita salamander, a species of salamander in the family Hynobiidae endemic to Japan
