= Kinjirō =

- Gender: Male

Origin
- Origin: Japanese
- Meaning: Different meanings depending on the kanji used

Kinjirō, Kinjiro or Kinjirou (written: 金治郎, 金二郎, 錦治郎 or 欽次郎) is a masculine Japanese given name. Notable people with the name include:

- Kinjiro Matsudaira (松平 欽次郎; 1885–1963), American inventor and politician
- Kinjiro Nakamura (仲村 錦治郎; born 1975), Japanese table tennis player
- Kinjirō Ninomiya (二宮 金次郎; 1787–1856), later known as Sontoku Ninomiya (二宮 尊徳), Japanese agricultural leader.
- Kinjiro Okabe (岡部 金治郎; 1896–1984), Japanese electrical engineer
- Kinjiro Shimizu (清水 金二郎), Japanese footballer
