= Hidaka (surname) =

Hidaka (written: 日高) is a Japanese surname. Notable people with the surname include:

- Hatsuo Hidaka (日高 初男; 1915–?), Japanese World War II flying ace
- Hiroaki Hidaka (日高 広明; 1962–2006), Japanese serial killer
- Ikuto Hidaka (日高 郁人; born 1972), Japanese professional wrestler
- Keita Hidaka (日髙 慶太; born 1990), Japanese footballer
- Mayumi Hidaka (日高 真弓; born 1981), Japanese actress
- Mitsuhiro Hidaka (日高 光啓; born 1986), Japanese singer, rapper, actor and dancer
- Moriyasu Hidaka (日高 盛康), Imperial Japanese Navy officer
- Noriko Hidaka (日髙 のり子; born 1962), Japanese voice actress
- Noritaka Hidaka (日高 憲敬; born 1947), Japanese footballer
- Rina Hidaka (日高 里菜; born 1994), Japanese voice actress
- Ryo Hidaka (日高 亮; born 1990), Japanese baseball player
- Hidaka Sōnojō (日高 壮之丞; 1848–1932), Imperial Japanese Navy admiral
- Sumiko Hidaka (日高 澄子; 1923–2002), Japanese actress
- Takeshi Hidaka (日高 剛; born 1977), Japanese baseball player
- Takuma Hidaka (日高 拓磨; born 1983), Japanese footballer
- Usaburo Hidaka (日高 卯三郎), Japanese footballer

== Fictional characters ==
- Chinatsu Hidaka (日高 ちなつ), a character in the manga series New Game!
- Ken Hidaka (飛鷹 健), a character in the media franchise Weiß Kreuz
- Mamoru Hidaka (日高 守), a character in the anime series Creamy Mami, the Magic Angel
- Shurato Hidaka (日高 秋亜人), a character in the manga and anime series Legend of Heavenly Sphere Shurato
- Yuri Hidaka (日高 由梨), a character in the manga series Hikaru no Go
