= Shikata =

Shikata (written: 志方) is a Japanese surname. Notable people with the surname include:

- Akiko Shikata (志方 あきこ), Japanese singer-songwriter and composer
- Masuzo Shikata (志方 益三, 1895–1964), Japanese chemist
- Miiko Shikata (1925–2023), American actress known as Miiko Taka
- Nao Shikata (四方 菜穂, born 1979), Japanese footballer
