= Shogo Kamo =

Japanese footballer

Shogo Kamo 加茂 正五
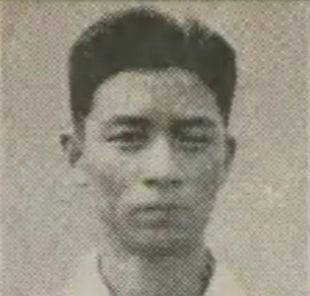
- Shogo Kamo, July 1936

Personal information
- Full name: Shogo Kamo
- Date of birth: December 12, 1915
- Place of birth: Hamamatsu, Shizuoka, Empire of Japan
- Date of death: September 14, 1977 (aged 61)
- Place of death: Shinjuku, Tokyo, Japan
- Height: 1.72 m (5 ft 7 1/2 in)
- Position: Forward

Youth career
- Hamamatsu Daiichi Junior High School
- Waseda Daiichi High School

College career
Years	Team	Apps	(Gls)
- Waseda University

Senior career*
Years	Team	Apps	(Gls)
- Waseda WMW

International career
1936	Japan	2	(0)
Medal record
Waseda University
Winner	Emperor's Cup	1938
- * Club domestic league appearances and goals

Shogo Kamo (加茂 正五, Kamo Shōgo; December 12, 1915 – September 14, 1977) was a Japanese football player. He played for Japan national team. His brother Takeshi Kamo also played for Japan national team.

== Club career ==
Kamo was born in Hamamatsu on December 12, 1915. He played for Waseda University. He won the 1938 Emperor's Cup with Sei Fuwa, Sekiji Sasano, Kunitaka Sueoka, Hidetoki Takahashi, and the rest of the team. After graduating from university, he played for Waseda WMW, which consisted of players who were fellow Waseda University alumni.

== National team career ==

In 1936, when Kamo was a Waseda University student, he was selected for the Japan national team for the 1936 Summer Olympics in Berlin. At this competition, he debuted against Sweden on August 4. He assisted Taizo Kawamoto and Tokutaro Ukon with goals, and Japan completed a come-from-behind victory. The first victory in the Olympics for Japan and a historic victory over one of the powerhouses later became known as the "Miracle of Berlin" (ベルリンの奇跡) in Japan. In 2016, this team was selected for the Japan Football Hall of Fame. On August 7, he also played against Italy. He played two games for Japan in 1936. His older brother Takeshi Kamo was also an Olympic footballer for Japan.

On September 14, 1977, Kamo collapsed during training for an exhibition match at the National Stadium in Shinjuku, Tokyo. He died of a myocardial infarction at a hospital at the age of 61.

== National team statistics ==
Japan national team
Year	Apps	Goals
1936	2	0
Total	2	0
