= Fukusaburo Harada =

Japanese footballer

Fukusaburo Harada 原田 福三郎
Personal information
- Full name: Fukusaburo Harada
- Place of birth: Empire of Japan
- Position: Goalkeeper

Youth career
- Meisei Commercial High School

Senior career*
Years	Team	Apps	(Gls)
- Osaka SC

International career
1923	Japan	2	(0)
- * Club domestic league appearances and goals

Fukusaburo Harada (原田 福三郎, Harada Fukusaburo) was a Japanese football player. He played for Japan national team.

== Club career ==
Harada played for Osaka SC was founded by his alma mater high school graduates and many Japan national team players Kiyoo Kanda, Shiro Azumi, Usaburo Hidaka, Toshio Hirabayashi, Setsu Sawagata, Kikuzo Kisaka, Yoshio Fujiwara and Shumpei Inoue were playing in those days.

== National team career ==
In May 1923, Harada was selected Japan national team for 1923 Far Eastern Championship Games in Osaka. At this competition, on May 23, he debuted against Philippines. This match is Japan team first match in International A Match. Next day, he also played against Republic of China. But Japan lost in both matches (1-2, v Philippines and 1-5, v Republic of China). He played 2 games for Japan in 1923. He was also selected Japan for 1925 Far Eastern Championship Games, but he did not compete, as he was the team's reserve goalkeeper behind Yanosuke Watanabe.

== National team statistics ==
Japan national team
Year	Apps	Goals
1923	2	0
Total	2	0
