= Yasukazu =

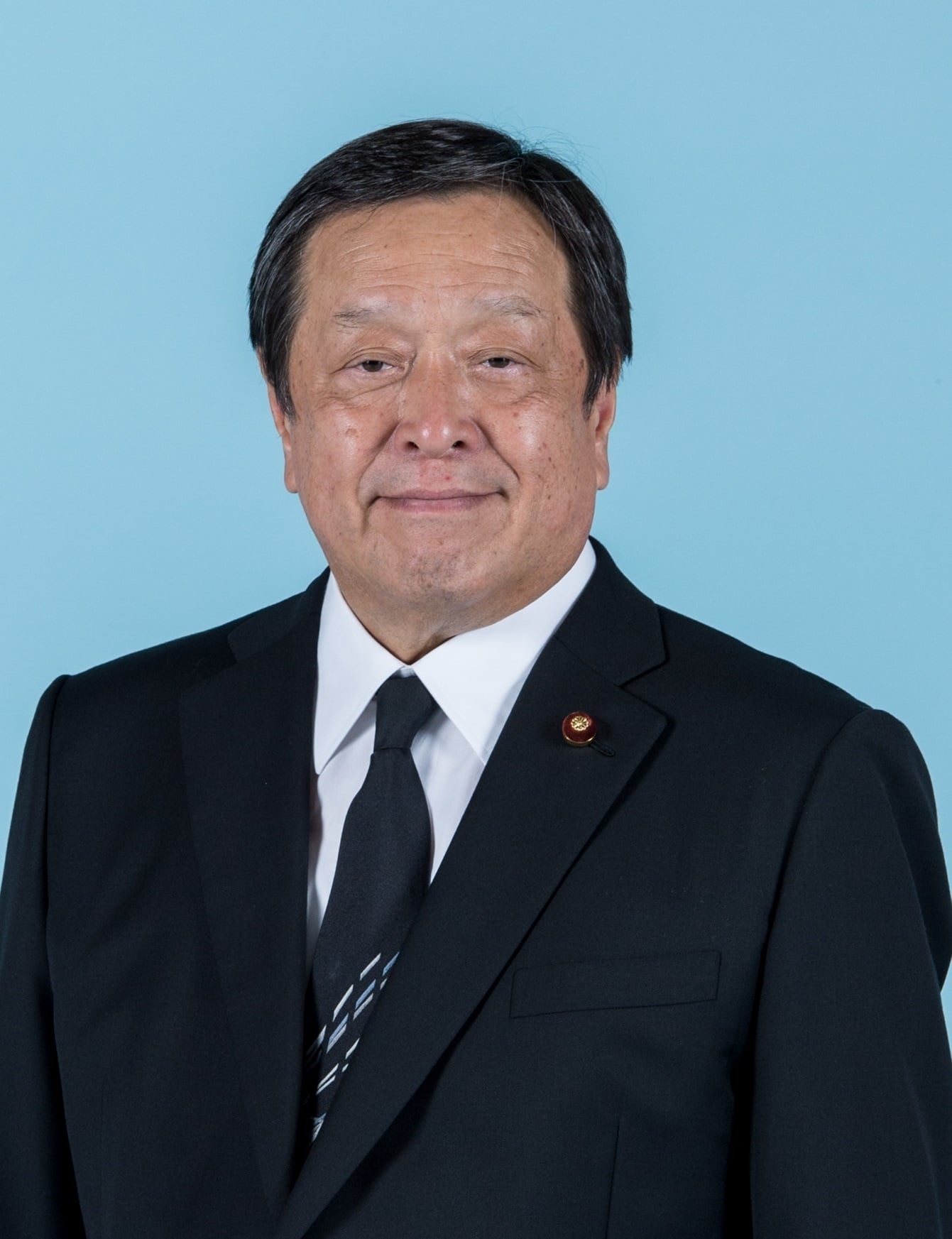
- Yasukazu Hamada, Japanese politician
- Pronunciation: jasɯkadzɯ (IPA)
- Gender: Male

Origin
- Origin: Japanese
- Meaning: Different meanings depending on the kanji used

Yasukazu is a masculine Japanese given name.

== Written forms ==
Yasukazu can be written using many different combinations of kanji characters. Here are some examples:

- 靖一, "peaceful, one"
- 靖和, "peaceful, harmony"
- 靖多, "peaceful, many"
- 康和, "healthy, harmony"
- 康一, "healthy, one"
- 康数, "healthy, number"
- 安和, "tranquil, harmony"
- 安多, "tranquil, many"
- 保一, "preserve, one"
- 保和, "preserve, harmony"
- 保多, "preserve, many"
- 泰和, "peaceful, harmony"
- 泰一, "peaceful, one"
- 八洲和, "8, continent, harmony"
- 易和, "divination, harmony"

The name can also be written in hiragana やすかず or katakana ヤスカズ.

== Notable people with the name ==
- Yasukazu Hamada (浜田 靖一; born 1955), Japanese politician
- Yasukazu Tanaka (田中 雍和; born 1933), Japanese footballer
