= Kikuzo Kisaka =

Japanese footballer

Kikuzo Kisaka 木坂 規矩三
Personal information
- Full name: Kikuzo Kisaka
- Place of birth: Empire of Japan
- Position: Forward

Youth career
- Kobe Higher Commercial School

Senior career*
Years	Team	Apps	(Gls)
- Osaka SC

International career
1923	Japan	2	(0)
- * Club domestic league appearances and goals

Kikuzo Kisaka (木坂 規矩三, Kisaka Kikuzo) was a Japanese football player. He played for Japan national team.

== Club career ==
After graduating from Kobe Higher Commercial School, Kisaka played for Osaka SC many Japan national team players Kiyoo Kanda, Shiro Azumi, Fukusaburo Harada, Usaburo Hidaka, Toshio Hirabayashi, Setsu Sawagata, Yoshio Fujiwara and Shumpei Inoue were playing in those days.

== National team career ==
In May 1923, Kisaka was selected Japan national team for 1923 Far Eastern Championship Games in Osaka. At this competition, on May 23, he debuted against Philippines. This match is Japan team first match in International A Match. Next day, he also played against Republic of China. But Japan lost in both matches (1–2, v Philippines and 1–5, v Republic of China). He played 2 games for Japan in 1923.

== National team statistics ==
Japan national team
Year	Apps	Goals
1923	2	0
Total	2	0
