= Yoshio Fujiwara =

Japanese footballer

Yoshio Fujiwara 藤原 良夫
Personal information
- Full name: Yoshio Fujiwara
- Place of birth: Empire of Japan
- Position: Forward

Youth career
- Mikage Higher Normal School

Senior career*
Years	Team	Apps	(Gls)
- Osaka SC

International career
1923	Japan	1	(0)
- * Club domestic league appearances and goals

Yoshio Fujiwara (藤原 良夫, Fujiwara Yoshio) was a Japanese football player. He played for Japan national team.

== Club career ==
After graduating from Mikage Higher Normal School, Fujiwara played for Osaka SC many Japan national team players Kiyoo Kanda, Shiro Azumi, Fukusaburo Harada, Usaburo Hidaka, Toshio Hirabayashi, Setsu Sawagata, Kikuzo Kisaka and Shumpei Inoue were playing in those days.

== National team career ==
In May 1923, Fujiwara was selected Japan national team for 1923 Far Eastern Championship Games in Osaka. At this competition, on May 23, he debuted against Philippines. But Japan lost this match (1–2). This match is Japan team first match in International A Match.

== National team statistics ==
Japan national team
Year	Apps	Goals
1923	1	0
Total	1	0
