= Cai Bingfen =

Chinese footballer

Personal information
- Position: Forward

International career
Years	Team	Apps	(Gls)
1927	China	2	(3)

Cai Bingfen (Chinese: 蔡炳芬; pinyin: Cài Bǐngfēn) was a Chinese footballer who played as a forward for the China national football team.

== Career statistics ==
=== International ===
National team	Year	Apps	Goals
China	1927	2	3
Total		2	3

=== International goals ===
Scores and results list China's goal tally first.

No	Date	Venue	Opponent	Score	Result	Competition
1.	27 August 1927	Zhonghua Stadium, Shanghai, China	Japan	2–0	5–1	1927 Far Eastern Championship Games
2.	27 August 1927	Zhonghua Stadium, Shanghai, China	Japan	–	5–1	1927 Far Eastern Championship Games
3.	27 August 1927	Zhonghua Stadium, Shanghai, China	Japan	5–1	5–1	1927 Far Eastern Championship Games
