= Shumpei Inoue =

Japanese footballer

Shumpei Inoue 井上 俊平
Personal information
- Full name: Shumpei Inoue
- Place of birth: Empire of Japan
- Position: Forward

Youth career
- Mikage Higher Normal School

Senior career*
Years	Team	Apps	(Gls)
- Osaka SC

International career
1923	Japan	1	(0)
- * Club domestic league appearances and goals

Shumpei Inoue (井上 俊平, Inoue Shumpei) was a Japanese football player. He played for Japan national team.

== Club career ==
After graduating from Mikage Higher Normal School, Inoue played for Osaka SC many Japan national team players Kiyoo Kanda, Shiro Azumi, Fukusaburo Harada, Usaburo Hidaka, Toshio Hirabayashi, Setsu Sawagata, Kikuzo Kisaka and Yoshio Fujiwara were playing in those days.

== National team career ==
In May 1923, Inoue was selected Japan national team for 1923 Far Eastern Championship Games in Osaka. At this competition, on May 24, he debuted against Republic of China. But Japan lost the matches (1-5).

== National team statistics ==
Japan national team
Year	Apps	Goals
1923	1	0
Total	1	0
