= Daigoro Kondo =

Japanese footballer

Daigoro Kondo 近藤 台五郎
Personal information
- Full name: Daigoro Kondo
- Date of birth: June 1, 1907
- Place of birth: Tokyo, Empire of Japan
- Date of death: February 9, 1991 (aged 83)
- Place of death: Yokosuka, Kanagawa, Japan
- Position: Defender

Youth career
- Mito High School
- ????–1932: Tokyo Imperial University

Senior career*
Years	Team	Apps	(Gls)
- Tokyo Imperial University LB

International career
1927	Japan	2	(0)
- * Club domestic league appearances and goals

Daigoro Kondo (近藤 台五郎, Kondo Daigoro; June 1, 1907 – February 9, 1991) was a Japanese football player. He played for Japan national team.

== Club career ==
Kondo was born in Tokyo on June 1, 1907. He played for Tokyo Imperial University LB was consisted of his alma mater Tokyo Imperial University players and graduates.

== National team career ==
In August 1927, when Kondo was a Mito High School student, he was selected Japan national team for 1927 Far Eastern Championship Games in Shanghai. At this competition, on August 27, he debuted against Republic of China. On August 29, he also played against Philippines and Japan won this match. This is Japan national team first victory in International A Match. He played 2 games for Japan in 1927.

== After retirement ==
After graduating from Tokyo Imperial University, Kondo retired and became a doctor. He served as a professor of Tokyo Women's Medical University and so on.

On February 9, 1991, Kondo died of intracranial hemorrhage in Yokosuka at the age of 83.

== National team statistics ==
Japan national team
Year	Apps	Goals
1927	2	0
Total	2	0
