= Takeshi Kamo =

Japanese footballer

Takeshi Kamo 加茂 健
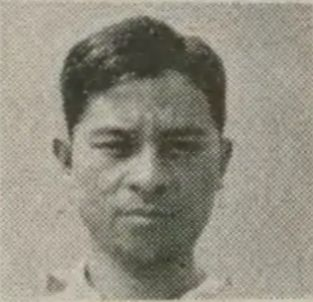
- Takeshi Kamo, July 1936

Personal information
- Full name: Takeshi Kamo
- Date of birth: February 8, 1915
- Place of birth: Hamamatsu, Shizuoka, Empire of Japan
- Date of death: March 26, 2004 (aged 89)
- Place of death: Kawasaki, Kanagawa, Japan
- Position: Forward

Youth career
- Hamamatsu Daiichi Junior High School
- Waseda Daiichi High School

College career
| Years | Team | Apps | (Gls) |
| 1932–1937 | Waseda University | | |

International career
| 1936 | Japan | 2 | (0) |

Takeshi Kamo (加茂 健, Kamo Takeshi; February 8, 1915 – March 26, 2004) was a Japanese football player who represented the Japan national team. His brother Shogo Kamo also played for Japan national team.

== National team career ==

Miracle of Berlin (1936 Olympics 1st round v Sweden on August 4)

Kamo was born in Hamamatsu on February 8, 1915. In 1936, when he was a Waseda University student, he was selected for the Japan national team for the 1936 Summer Olympics in Berlin. He debuted against Sweden at this competition on August 4. Japan completed a come-from-behind victory against Sweden. The first victory in the Olympics for Japan and a historic victory over one of the powerhouses became later known as "Miracle of Berlin" (ベルリンの奇跡) in Japan. On August 7, he also played against Italy. He played two games for Japan in 1936. His younger brother Shogo Kamo was also an Olympic footballer for Japan. In 2016, this team was selected for the Japan Football Hall of Fame.

On March 26, 2004, Kamo died of heart failure at Miyamae Hospital in Kawasaki at the age of 89. He was the last surviving member of his team from the 1936 Olympics.

== National team statistics ==
Japan national team
| Year | Apps | Goals |
|---|---|---|
| 1936 | 2 | 0 |
| Total | 2 | 0 |
