= Setsu Sawagata =

Japanese footballer

Setsu Sawagata 澤潟 節
Personal information
- Full name: Setsu Sawagata
- Place of birth: Empire of Japan
- Position: Midfielder

Senior career*
Years	Team	Apps	(Gls)
- Osaka SC

International career
1923	Japan	2	(0)
- * Club domestic league appearances and goals

Setsu Sawagata (澤潟 節, Sawagata Setsu) was a Japanese football player. He played for Japan national team.

== Club career ==
Sawagata played for Osaka SC many Japan national team players Kiyoo Kanda, Shiro Azumi, Fukusaburo Harada, Usaburo Hidaka, Toshio Hirabayashi, Kikuzo Kisaka, Yoshio Fujiwara and Shumpei Inoue were playing in those days.

== National team career ==
In May 1923, Sawagata was selected Japan national team for 1923 Far Eastern Championship Games in Osaka. At this competition, on May 23, he debuted against Philippines. This match is Japan team first match in International A Match. Next day, he also played against Republic of China. But Japan lost in both matches (1-2, v Philippines and 1-5, v Republic of China). He played 2 games for Japan in 1923.

== National team statistics ==
Japan national team
Year	Apps	Goals
1923	2	0
Total	2	0
