= Rihei Sano =

Japanese footballer

Rihei Sano 佐野 理平
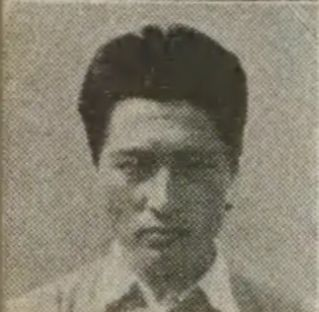
- Rihei Sano, July 1936

Personal information
- Full name: Rihei Sano
- Date of birth: September 21, 1912
- Place of birth: Shizuoka, Empire of Japan
- Date of death: March 26, 1992 (aged 79)
- Place of death: Japan
- Position: Goalkeeper

Youth career
- Waseda University

Senior career*
Years	Team	Apps	(Gls)
- Waseda WMW

International career
1936	Japan	2	(0)
- * Club domestic league appearances and goals

Rihei Sano (佐野 理平, Sano Rihei; September 21, 1912 – March 26, 1992) was a Japanese football player. He played for Japan national team.

== Club career ==
Sano was born in Shizuoka Prefecture on September 21, 1912. He played for Waseda WMW was consisted of his alma mater Waseda University players and graduates.

== National team career ==

Miracle of Berlin (1936 Olympics 1st round v Sweden on August 4)

In 1936, when Sano was a Waseda University student, he was selected Japan national team for 1936 Summer Olympics in Berlin. At this competition, on August 4, he debuted against Sweden. Japan completed a come-from-behind victory against Sweden. The first victory in Olympics for the Japan and the historic victory over one of the powerhouses became later known as "Miracle of Berlin" (ベルリンの奇跡) in Japan. In 2016, this team was selected Japan Football Hall of Fame. On August 7, he also played against Italy. He played 2 games for Japan in 1936.

Sano died on March 26, 1992, at the age of 79.

== National team statistics ==
Japan national team
Year	Apps	Goals
1936	2	0
Total	2	0
