= Yasuo Haruyama =

Japanese footballer

Yasuo Haruyama 春山 泰雄
Personal information
- Full name: Yasuo Haruyama
- Date of birth: April 4, 1906
- Place of birth: Tokyo, Empire of Japan
- Date of death: June 17, 1987 (aged 81)
- Place of death: Toshima, Tokyo, Japan
- Position: Forward

Youth career
- Mito High School
- ????–1931: Tokyo Imperial University

Senior career*
Years	Team	Apps	(Gls)
- Tokyo Imperial University LB

International career
1927–1930	Japan	4	(0)
- * Club domestic league appearances and goals

Yasuo Haruyama (春山 泰雄, Haruyama Yasuo; April 4, 1906 – June 17, 1987) was a Japanese football player.

== Club career ==
Haruyama was born in Tokyo on April 4, 1906. He played for Tokyo Imperial University LB was consisted of his alma mater Tokyo Imperial University players and graduates.

== National team career ==
In August 1927, when Haruyama was a Mito High School student, he was selected Japan national team for 1927 Far Eastern Championship Games in Shanghai. At this competition, on August 27, he debuted against Republic of China. On August 29, he also played against Philippines, and Japan won this match. This is Japan national team first victory in International A Match. He also played at 1930 Far Eastern Championship Games in Tokyo and Japan won the championship. He played 4 games for Japan until 1930.

== After retirement ==
After retirement, Haruyama joined Nikkan Sports in 1946.

On June 17, 1987, Haruyama died of a bleeding of gastrointestinal tract in Toshima, Tokyo at the age of 81.

== National team statistics ==
Japan national team
Year	Apps	Goals
1927	2	0
1928	0	0
1929	0	0
1930	2	0
Total	4	0
