= Shigemaru Takenokoshi =

Japanese footballer, manager, and referee

Shigemaru Takenokoshi 竹腰 重丸
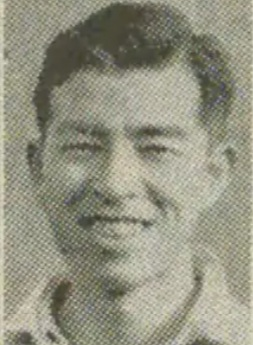
- Shigemaru Takenokoshi, July 1936

Personal information
- Full name: Shigemaru Takenokoshi
- Date of birth: February 15, 1906
- Place of birth: Usuki, Oita, Empire of Japan
- Date of death: October 6, 1980 (aged 74)
- Place of death: Bunkyo, Tokyo, Japan
- Position: Midfielder

Youth career
- 1922–1924: Yamaguchi High School

College career
Years	Team	Apps	(Gls)
1925–1929	Tokyo Imperial University		

Senior career*
Years	Team	Apps	(Gls)
1930–????	Tokyo Imperial University LB		
- Tokyo OB Club

International career
1925–1930	Japan	5	(1)

Managerial career
- 1934: Japan
- 1938–1940: Japan
- 1951–1956: Japan
- 1958–1959: Japan
Medal record
Tokyo OB Club
Winner	Emperor's Cup	1933
- * Club domestic league appearances and goals

Shigemaru Takenokoshi (竹腰 重丸, Takenokoshi Shigemaru; February 15, 1906 – October 6, 1980) was a Japanese football player, manager, and referee. He played for Japan national team. He also managed Japan national team.

== Club career ==
Takenokoshi was born in Usuki on February 15, 1906. He played for Tokyo Imperial University LB was consisted of his alma mater Tokyo Imperial University players and graduates. He also played for Tokyo OB Club and won 1933 Emperor's Cup with Shiro Teshima and Teiichi Matsumaru.

== National team career ==
In May 1925, when Takenokoshi was a Tokyo Imperial University student, he was selected Japan national team for 1925 Far Eastern Championship Games in Manila. At this competition, on May 20, he debuted against Republic of China. He also played at 1927 in Shanghai and 1930 Far Eastern Championship Games in Tokyo. At 1927 Far Eastern Championship Games, on August 29, he scored a goal against Philippines and Japan won this match. This is Japan national team first victory in International A Match. At 1930 Far Eastern Championship Games, he led Japan to the champions as captain. He played 5 games and scored 1 goal for Japan until 1930.

== Coaching career ==
In 1934, Takenokoshi was named manager for Japan national team for the 1934 Far Eastern Championship Games in Manila. In 1936, he served as assistant coach under manager Shigeyoshi Suzuki for 1936 Summer Olympics in Berlin. Japan completed a come-from-behind victory against powerhouse Sweden. This was the first Olympic football victory for Japan and later became known in Japan as "The Miracle of Berlin." (ベルリンの奇跡) In 2016, this team was selected Japan Football Hall of Fame. He also managed Japan from 1938 to 1940.

After World War II, in 1951, Takenokoshi became a manager for Japan as Hirokazu Ninomiya's successor. He managed at 1954 Asian Games and 1956 Summer Olympics. After 1956 Summer Olympics, he resigned. In 1958, he became a manager for Japan as Taizo Kawamoto successor again. However, in December 1959, at 1960 Summer Olympics qualification, following Japan's failure to qualify for 1960 Summer Olympics, he stepped down as manager.

On October 6, 1980, Takenokoshi died of stroke in Bunkyo, Tokyo at the age of 74. In 2005, he was selected Japan Football Hall of Fame.

== National team statistics ==
Japan national team
Year	Apps	Goals
1925	1	0
1926	0	0
1927	2	1
1928	0	0
1929	0	0
1930	2	0
Total	5	1

== Honours ==
- Japan Football Hall of Fame: Inducted in 2005
