= Junji Nishikawa =

Japanese footballer

Junji Nishikawa 西川 潤之
Personal information
- Full name: Junji Nishikawa
- Date of birth: June 29, 1907
- Place of birth: Empire of Japan
- Position: Goalkeeper

Youth career
- Hosei University

International career
| Years | Team | Apps | (Gls) |
| 1927 | Japan | 2 | (0) |

Junji Nishikawa (西川 潤之, Nishikawa Junji; born June 29, 1907, date of death unknown) was a Japanese football player. He played for Japan national team.

== National team career ==
Nishikawa was born on June 29, 1907. In August 1927, when he was a Hosei University student, he was selected Japan national team for 1927 Far Eastern Championship Games in Shanghai. At this competition, on August 27, he debuted against Republic of China. On August 29, he also played against Philippines and Japan won this match. This is Japan national team first victory in International A Match. He played 2 games for Japan in 1927.

== National team statistics ==
Japan national team
| Year | Apps | Goals |
|---|---|---|
| 1927 | 2 | 0 |
| Total | 2 | 0 |
