= Meiji Gakuin Senior High School =

Private high school in Tokyo, Japan

- 明治学院高等学校

- Meiji Gakuin Senior High School in 2024

Location
- 1-2-37 Shirokanedai; Minato, Tokyo, 108-0071; Japan; 35.6365°N 139.7302°E

Information
- School type: Private senior high school
- Religious affiliation: Christianity
- Established: 1863; 163 years ago (predecessor)
- Founder: James Curtis Hepburn
- Principal: Nozomi Tokunaga
- Grades: 10–12
- Gender: Coeducational
- Enrollment: 976 (April 2026)
- Language: Japanese
- Affiliation: Meiji Gakuin University
- Website: www.meigaku.ed.jp

Meiji Gakuin Senior High School (明治学院高等学校, Meiji Gakuin Kōtōgakkō) is a private senior high school in Shirokane, Minato, Tokyo. Affiliated with Meiji Gakuin University (学校法人明治学院), it originated from the Meiji Gakuin, which was established in 1887 and housed a five-year secondary education program, originally only for boys. After World War I this was modified into separate junior high school and senior high school programs. The school became coeducational in 1991.

== Notable alumni ==
- Tōson Shimazaki - writer
- Wada Eisaku - painter
- Masuda Takashi - industrialist
- Morinosuke Chiwaki - dentist
- Numa Morikazu - politician
- Yi Gwangsu - Korean independence activist
- Yoshie Fujiwara - operatic tenor
- Misao Tamai - footballer
- Miliyah Kato - singer-songwriter and fashion designer
