= Tokizo Ichihashi =

Japanese footballer

Tokizo Ichihashi 市橋 時蔵
Personal information
- Full name: Tokizo Ichihashi
- Date of birth: June 9, 1909
- Place of birth: Hyogo, Empire of Japan
- Position: Forward

Youth career
- Kobe Daiichi High School
- Keio University

Senior career*
Years	Team	Apps	(Gls)
- Keio BRB

International career
1930	Japan	2	(1)
- * Club domestic league appearances and goals

Tokizo Ichihashi (市橋 時蔵, Ichihashi Tokizo; June 9, 1909 – ?) was a Japanese football player. He played for Japan national team.

== Club career ==
Ichihashi was born in Hyogo Prefecture on June 9, 1909. He played for Keio BRB was consisted of his alma mater Keio University players and graduates.

== National team career ==
In May 1930, when Ichihashi was a Keio University student, he was selected Japan national team for 1930 Far Eastern Championship Games in Tokyo and Japan won the championship. At this competition, on May 25, he debuted and scored a goal against Philippines. On May 29, he also played against Republic of China. He played 2 matches and scored 1 goal for Japan in 1930.

== National team statistics ==
Japan national team
Year	Apps	Goals
1930	2	1
Total	2	1
