= Fukui Fumimasa =

Japanese Buddhist scholar-monk, Sinology scholar, and Tendai monk

Fukui Fumimasa (June 6, 1934 – May 4, 2017) was a Japanese Buddhist scholar-monk, Sinology scholar and Tendai monk; he was a monk in the highest grade. He was the chief monk at Yuishinin Temple, a temple within Nikkozan Rinnō-ji Temple located at Nikkō, Tochigi Prefecture and was professor emeritus at Waseda University. His father was Fukui Kōjun, and his younger brother was Fukui Shigemasa. Both father and brother were Asian Studies scholars and Tendai Buddhist monks.

== Biography ==
Fukui was born in Tokyo. He went to Waseda University Junior and Senior High School and specialized in Asian Philosophy at Waseda University's Literature Department. Fukui pursued advanced studies at Waseda and received both his Masters and Doctorate degrees there. He went abroad to study in France and was a student of Paul Demiéville (1894–1979), Maxime Kaltenmark (1910–2002) and Rolf Stein (1911–1999). Fukui later became a professor at Waseda University. Fukui specialized in the historical philology of the Heart Sutra and the theories on the formation of Daoism. During the Cultural Revolution in China, he assisted many French sinologists in gaining access to research institutions, monasteries and universities in Japan.

In 1991, he was honored with the rank of chevalier in the French Ordre des Palmes académiques for his extraordinary scholastic merit. In 2014, he was honored with the Japanese Order of the Sacred Treasure. He was a member of the 17th and 18th Science Council of Japan. From 1996 to 2004, he was the eighth president of Waseda University's Young Buddhist Association. He retired at age 70.

Forty-eight Japanese essays were written to honor Fukui Fumimasa on his seventieth birthday and retirement in Philosophy and Ritual in the Asian Culture - Essays in honour of Dr Fumimasa-Bunga Fukui on his seventieth birthday along with a brief biography.

== Selected bibliography ==
=== Sole author ===
- Fukui, Fumimasa (福井文雅) (1987), 般若心経の歴史的研究 [Study of the History of the Prajñāpāramitāhṛdaya Sūtra (Heart Sutra)] (in Japanese, Chinese, and English), Shunjūsha, ISBN 978-4393111284
- Fukui, Fumimasa (福井文雅) (1991A), 欧米の東洋学と比較論 [Study of European and American Oriental Studies] (in Japanese), Ryūbunkan, ISBN 978-4897473147
- Fukui, Fumimasa (福井文雅) (1991B), 中国思想研究と現代 [Research into Chinese Thought and Today] (in Japanese), Ryūbunkan, ISBN 978-4897473154
- Fukui, Fumimasa (1994A), "La fonction bouddhique des song ou "strophes" dans la littérature taoïste [The Buddhist Function of sòng [頌] or "Verse" in Daoist Literature]", in Fukui, Fumimasa (福井文雅); Fussman, Gérard (eds.), Bouddhisme et cultures locales: Quelques cas de réciproques adaptations : actes du colloque franco-japonais de septembre 1991 (Etudes thématiques) [Buddhism and Local Cultures: Some Cases of Reciprocal Adaptations : Proceedings of the Franco-Japanese Conference September 1991] (in French), Ecole française d'Extrême-Orient, ISBN 978-2855396019
- Fukui, Fumimasa (福井文雅) (1998), 漢字文化圏の思想と宗教 儒教、仏教、道教 [Thought and Religion in the Sinographic Sphere : Confucianism, Buddhism and Daoism] (in Japanese), Goyōshobō, ISBN 978-4795253933
- Fukui, Fumimasa (福井文雅) (2000), 般若心経の総合的研究 歴史・社会・資料 [A Comprehensive Study of the Prajñāpāramitāhṛdaya Sūtra (Heart Sutra) : History, Society and Historical Data] (in Japanese), Shunjūsha, ISBN 978-4393112045
- Fukui, Fumimasa (福井文雅) (2000), 道教の歴史と構造 増補修訂 [History and Structure of Daoism - Revised and Supplemented] (in Japanese), Goyōshobō, ISBN 4906673015
- Fukui, Fumimasa (福井文雅) (2002), 漢字文化圏の座標 [The Sinographic Cultural Sphere] (in Japanese, Chinese, English, and French), Goyōshobō, ISBN 978-4896197419
- Fukui, Fumimasa (福井文雅) (2005), 般若心経ドリル [Exercises in the Prajñāpāramitāhṛdaya Sūtra (Heart Sutra)] (in Japanese), Hitotsubashi Shoten, ISBN 978-4565076007
- Fukui, Fumimasa (福井文雅) (2006), アジア思想概論 [Outline of Asian Thought] (in Japanese), Goyōshobō, ISBN 978-4896197433
- Fukui, Fumimasa (福井文雅) (2007), "L'état présent des études sur le sūtra du cœur, par m. Bunga Fukui" [The Present State of Studies on the Heart Sutra by Bunga Fukui] (PDF), Comptes rendus des séances de l'Académie des Inscriptions et Belles-Lettres (in French) (151–2): 695–704
- Fukui, Fumimasa (福井文雅) (2008), ヨーロッパの東方学と般若心経研究の歴史 [History of European Oriental Studies and Research into the Prajñāpāramitāhṛdaya Sūtra (Heart Sutra)] (in Japanese), Goyōshobō, ISBN 978-4896197440

=== Works co-authored ===
- Fukui, Fumimasa (福井文雅); Godard, Colette [in French] (1966), La Chine et le Japon - religions du monde [China and Japan - World Religions] (in French), Blood & Gay
- Fukui, Fumimasa (福井文雅) (1984), Makita, Tairyō (牧田諦亮) [in Japanese] (ed.), 敦煌と中国仏教 講座敦煌7 [Dunhuang and Chinese Buddhism, Lectures on Dunhuang Volume 7] (in Japanese), vol. 7, Daitō Shuppansha, ISBN 4500004564
- Fukui, Fumimasa (福井文雅); Nitta, Daisaku (新田大作) [in Japanese], eds. (1991C), チャレンジ漢和辞典 [Challenge Chinese–Japanese Dictionary] (in Japanese), Fukutake Shoten, ISBN 978-4828804309
- Fukui, Fumimasa (福井文雅) (1991D), Yamada, Toshiaki (山田利明) [in Japanese]; Maeda, Shigeki (前田繁樹) [in Japanese] (eds.), 道教と中国思想 講座道教 4 [Daoism and Chinese Thought– Lectures on Daoism Volume 4] (in Japanese), vol. 4, Yūzankaku, ISBN 978-4639016946
- Fukui, Fumimasa (福井文雅); Noguchi, Tetsurō (野口鉄郎) [in Japanese]; Sakade, Noshiyobu (坂出祥伸) [in Japanese]; Yamada, Toshiaki (山田利明) [in Japanese], eds. (1994B), 道教事典 [Encyclopedia of Daoism] (in Japanese), Hirakawa Shuppan, ISBN 978-4892032356
- Zürcher, Erik; Fukui, Bunga-Fumimasa (1996), "Chapter 27.1 Early Medieval China (from A.D. 200-500)", History of Humanity:Volume 3:From the Seventh Century B.C. to the Seventh Century A.D., vol. 3, London: Routledge, pp. 508–517, ISBN 9780415093071
- Fukui, Fumimasa (福井文雅), ed. (2003), 東方学の新視点 [New Viewpoints on East Asian Studies] (in Japanese), Goyōshobō, ISBN 978-4896197426

=== Translations by Fukui Fumimasa ===
- Gernet, Jacques (1965), La Chine Ancienne 古代中国 [Ancient China] (in Japanese), translated by Fukui, Fumimasa (福井文雅), (Original language in French), Hakusuisha/Collection Que sais-je?
- Chen, Kenneth Kuan Sheng (1981), The Chinese Transformation of Buddhism 仏教と中国社会 [Buddhism and Chinese Society], The World of Buddhist Culture (叢書・仏教文化の世界) (in Japanese), translated by Fukui, Fumimasa (福井文雅); Okamoto, Tensei (岡本天晴), (Original language in English), Kinbanasha
- Stein, Rolf (1985), Jardins en miniature d'Extreme-Orient 盆栽の宇宙誌 [The Universe of Bonsai], Asian Culture (アジア文化叢書) (in Japanese), translated by Fukui, Fumimasa (福井文雅); Myojin, Hiroshi (明神洋), (Original language in French), Serika Shobō, ISBN 978-4796701433
- 大乗仏典 中国・日本篇10 敦煌I [Mahayana Buddhist Sutras: Chinese and Japanese works Volume 10, Dunhuang Part 1] (in Japanese), vol. 10, translated by Fukui, Fumimasa (福井文雅); Matsuo, Yoshiki (松尾良樹), (Original language in Chinese), Chūōkōronsha, 1992, ISBN 978-4124026306

=== Translations by Other Authors of Works by Fukui Fumimasa ===
- Fukui, Fumimasa (福井文雅) (1983), 般若心經觀在中國的變遷 [The Changing View of the Heart Sutra in China], 敦煌學 [Dunhuang Studies] (in Chinese), 6, translated by Guo, Zide (郭自得); Guo, Changcheng (郭長城), Taipei: 17–30
- Fukui, Fumimasa (福井文雅) (2010), 汉字文化圈的思想与宗教:儒教、佛教、道教 [original title:漢字文化圏の思想と宗教 儒教、仏教、道教] [Thought and Religion in the Sinographic Sphere : Confucianism, Buddhism and Daoism], translated by Xu, Shuisheng (徐水生); Zhang, Gu (张谷), 武汉大学出版 [Wuhan University Publishing House], ISBN 9787307076211

== Sources ==
- "福井文雅" [Fukui Fumimasa], 人事興信録 [Japanese Who's Who] (in Japanese), 興信データ[Kōshin Data], 2001, p. 1323
- Fukui, Fumimasa (福井文雅) (2007), "L'état présent des études sur le sūtra du cœur, par m. Bunga Fukui" [The Present State of Studies on the Heart Sutra by Bunga Fukui], Comptes rendus des séances de l'Académie des Inscriptions et Belles-Lettres (in French) (151–2): 695–704
- Gendai (2004), 現代日本人名録 [Who's who in Modern Japan 2004], Nichigai Associates
- The Committee for the Printing of Collected Essays Honoring Dr. Fukui Fumimasa's 70th Birthday and Retirement (福井文雅博士古稀・退職記念論集刊行会) (2005), アジア文化の思想と儀礼 : 福井文雅博士古稀記念論集. [Philosophy and Ritual in Asian Culture - Essays in honour of Dr Fumimasa-Bunga Fukui on his seventieth birthday] (in Japanese), Shunjūsha, ISBN 978-4393112335
