= Masao Takada =

Japanese footballer

Masao Takada 高田 正夫
Personal information
- Full name: Masao Takada
- Place of birth: Empire of Japan
- Position: Forward

Youth career
- Meisei Commercial High School
- Kwansei Gakuin University

Senior career*
Years	Team	Apps	(Gls)
- Kwangaku Club

International career
1925	Japan	2	(0)
- * Club domestic league appearances and goals

Masao Takada (高田 正夫, Takada Masao) was a Japanese football player. He played for Japan national team.

== Club career ==
Takada played for Kwangaku Club was consisted of his alma mater Kwansei Gakuin University players and graduates.

== National team career ==
In May 1925, when Takada was a Kwansei Gakuin University student, he was selected Japan national team for 1925 Far Eastern Championship Games in Manila. At this competition, on May 17, he debuted against Philippines. On May 20, he also played against Republic of China. But Japan lost in both matches (0-4, v Philippines and 0-2, v Republic of China). He played 2 games for Japan in 1925.

== National team statistics ==
Japan national team
Year	Apps	Goals
1925	2	0
Total	2	0
