= Hifuyo Uchida =

Japanese footballer

Hifuyo Uchida 内田 一二四
Personal information
- Full name: Hifuyo Uchida
- Place of birth: Empire of Japan
- Position: Forward

Youth career
- Kwansei Gakuin University

International career
Years	Team	Apps	(Gls)
1925	Japan	2	(0)

Hifuyo Uchida (内田 一二四, Uchida Hifuyo) was a Japanese football player. He played for Japan national team.

== National team career ==
In May 1925, when Uchida was a Kwansei Gakuin University student, he was selected Japan national team for 1925 Far Eastern Championship Games in Manila. At this competition, on May 17, he debuted against Philippines. On May 20, he also played against Republic of China. But Japan lost in both matches (0-4, v Philippines and 0–2, v Republic of China). He played 2 games for Japan in 1925.

== National team statistics ==
Japan national team
Year	Apps	Goals
1925	2	0
Total	2	0
