= Jiro Miyake =

Japanese footballer

Jiro Miyake 三宅 二郎
Personal information
- Full name: Jiro Miyake
- Place of birth: Empire of Japan
- Date of death: November 30, 1984 (aged 83)
- Place of death: Japan
- Position: Forward

Youth career
- 1921–1925: Kansai University

International career
| Years | Team | Apps | (Gls) |
| 1925 | Japan | 2 | (0) |

Jiro Miyake (三宅 二郎, Miyake Jirō; ? – November 30, 1984) was a Japanese football player. He played for the Japan national team.

== National team career ==
In May 1925, when Miyake was a Kansai University student, he was selected to play on the Japan national team for the 1925 Far Eastern Championship Games in Manila. At this competition, on May 17, he debuted against the Philippines. On May 20, he also played against the Republic of China. But Japan lost in both matches (0-4, v Philippines and 0-2, v Republic of China).

== After retirement ==
After graduating from Kansai University, Miyake joined Asahi Shimbun in 1926.

On November 30, 1984, Miyake died of pneumonia at the age of 83.

== National team statistics ==
Japan national team
| Year | Apps | Goals |
|---|---|---|
| 1925 | 2 | 0 |
| Total | 2 | 0 |
