= Usaburo Hidaka =

Japanese footballer

Usaburo Hidaka 日高 卯三郎
Personal information
- Full name: Usaburo Hidaka
- Place of birth: Japan
- Position: Defender

Youth career
- Meisei Commercial High School

Senior career*
Years	Team	Apps	(Gls)
- Osaka SC

International career
1923	Japan	2	(0)
- * Club domestic league appearances and goals

Usaburo Hidaka (日高 卯三郎, Hidaka Usaburō) was a Japanese football player. He played for the Japan national team.

== Club career ==
Hidaka played for Osaka SC was founded by his alma mater high school graduates and many Japan national team players Kiyoo Kanda, Shiro Azumi, Fukusaburo Harada, Toshio Hirabayashi, Setsu Sawagata, Kikuzo Kisaka, Yoshio Fujiwara and Shumpei Inoue were playing in those days.

== National team career ==
In May 1923, Hidaka was selected Japan national team for 1923 Far Eastern Championship Games in Osaka. At this competition, on May 23, he debuted against Philippines. This match is Japan team first match in International A Match. Next day, he also played against Republic of China. But Japan lost in both matches (1-2, v Philippines and 1-5, v Republic of China). He played 2 games for Japan in 1923.

== National team statistics ==
Japan national team
Year	Apps	Goals
1923	2	0
Total	2	0
