= Ryuzo Shimizu =

Japanese footballer

Ryuzo Shimizu 清水 隆三
Personal information
- Full name: Ryuzo Shimizu
- Date of birth: September 30, 1902
- Place of birth: Empire of Japan
- Position: Forward

Youth career
- Tokyo Aoyama Normal School

Senior career*
Years	Team	Apps	(Gls)
- Tokyo Shukyu-Dan

International career
1923	Japan	2	(1)
- * Club domestic league appearances and goals

Ryuzo Shimizu (清水 隆三, Shimizu Ryūzō; September 30, 1902 – ?) was a Japanese football player. He played for Japan national team.

== Club career ==
Shimizu was born on September 30, 1902. After graduating from Tokyo Aoyama Normal School, he played for Tokyo Shukyu-Dan was founded by his alma mater school graduates.

== National team career ==
In May 1923, Shimizu was selected Japan national team for 1923 Far Eastern Championship Games in Osaka. At this competition, on May 23, he debuted against Philippines and scored a goal in the 5th minute. However, Japan was lost at the end. This match is Japan team first match in International A Match and this goal is Japan team first goal in International A Match. Next day, he also played against Republic of China. But Japan lost in both matches (1–2, v Philippines and 1–5, v Republic of China). He played 2 games and scored 1 goal for Japan in 1923.

== National team statistics ==
Japan national team
Year	Apps	Goals
1923	2	1
Total	2	1
