= 1938 Emperor's Cup =

Tournament details
- Country: Japan

Final positions
- Champions: Waseda University
- Runners-up: Keio University
- Semifinalists: Kwansei Gakuin University; Yonhi College

Statistics of Emperor's Cup in the 1938 season.

== Overview ==
It was contested by 5 teams, and Waseda University won the championship.

== Results ==
=== Quarterfinals ===
- Kwansei Gakuin University 5–0 Nagoya Technical College

=== Semifinals ===
- Kwansei Gakuin University 2–5 Keio University
- Yonhi College 2–2 (lottery) Waseda University

=== Final ===
- Keio University 1–4 Waseda University

Waseda University won the championship.
