= Koichi Oita =

Japanese footballer and manager

Koichi Oita 種田 孝一
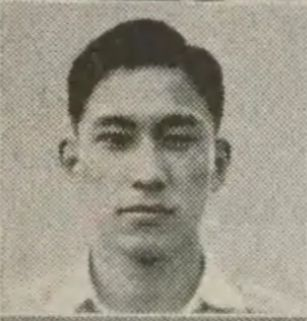
- Koichi Oita, July 1936

Personal information
- Full name: Koichi Oita
- Date of birth: April 9, 1914
- Place of birth: Tokyo, Empire of Japan
- Date of death: September 11, 1996 (aged 82)
- Place of death: Bunkyo, Tokyo, Japan
- Height: 1.74 m (5 ft 8 1/2 in)
- Positions: Defender; midfielder

Youth career
- ????: Mito High School
- ????–1937: Tokyo Imperial University

International career
Years	Team	Apps	(Gls)
1936	Japan	2	(0)

Managerial career
- 1947–1956: Sumitomo Metal

Koichi Oita (種田 孝一, Oita Koichi; April 9, 1914 – September 11, 1996) was a Japanese football player and manager. He played for Japan national team.

== National team career ==

Miracle of Berlin (1936 Olympics 1st round v Sweden on August 4)

Oita was born in Tokyo on April 9, 1914. In 1936, when he was a Tokyo Imperial University student, he was selected Japan national team for 1936 Summer Olympics in Berlin. At this competition, on August 4, he debuted against Sweden. Although he was a midfielder, he played as a defender. Japan completed a come-from-behind victory against Sweden. The first victory in Olympics for the Japan and the historic victory over one of the powerhouses became later known as "Miracle of Berlin" (ベルリンの奇跡) in Japan. In 2016, this team was selected Japan Football Hall of Fame. On August 7, he also played against Italy. He played 2 games for Japan in 1936.

== Coaching career ==
After retirement, in 1947, Oita became a manager for new club Sumitomo Metal and managed until 1956.

September 11, 1996, Oita died of heart failure in Bunkyo, Tokyo at the age of 82.

== National team statistics ==
Japan national team
Year	Apps	Goals
1936	2	0
Total	2	0
