= Tatsuya Shiji =

Japanese footballer and manager

Tatsuya Shiji 志治 達雄
Personal information
- Full name: Tatsuya Shiji
- Date of birth: October 20, 1938 (age 88)
- Place of birth: Aichi, Empire of Japan
- Height: 1.75 m (5 ft 9 in)
- Position: Forward

Youth career
- Atsuta High School
- 1958–1961: Kwansei Gakuin University

Senior career*
Years	Team	Apps	(Gls)
1962–????	Toyota Motors		

International career
1961	Japan	1	(1)

Managerial career
- 1965–1974: Toyota Motors
- * Club domestic league appearances and goals

Tatsuya Shiji (志治 達雄, Shiji Tatsuya; born October 20, 1938) is a former Japanese football player and manager. He played for Japan national team.

== Club career ==
Shiji was born in Aichi Prefecture on October 20, 1938. When he was a Kwansei Gakuin University student, he won 1959 Emperor's Cup as a member of Kwangaku Club was consisted of his alma mater Kwansei Gakuin University players and graduates. After graduating from Kwansei Gakuin University, he played for his local club Toyota Motors.

== National team career ==
On May 28, 1961, when Shiji was a Kwansei Gakuin University student, he debuted and scored a goal for Japan national team against Malaya.

== Coaching career ==
In 1965, Shiji became a manager for Toyota Motors. In 1966, the club joined Japanese Regional Leagues. He promoted the club to new division Japan Soccer League (JSL) Division 2 in 1972 and JSL Division 1 in 1973. He resigned in 1974.

== National team statistics ==
Japan national team
Year	Apps	Goals
1961	1	1
Total	1	1
