= Masuzo Shikata =

Masuzo Shikata (志方 益三, Shikata Masuzō, Tokyo, August 10, 1895 – May 8, 1964) was a Japanese chemist and one of the pioneers in electrochemistry. Together with his mentor and colleague, Czech chemist and inventor Jaroslav Heyrovský, he developed the first polarograph, a type of electrochemical analyzing machine, and co-authored the paper which introduced the machine and the name "polarograph". This machine was important because it automated the measurement of I-V curves (current-voltage curves) of solutions, which when done by hand could take over an hour for each test.

== Biography ==
After graduating from Department of Agricultural Chemistry at the Imperial University of Tokyo in 1920, Shikata gravitated towards electrochemistry and did further study at the Research Institute of Physics and Chemistry, also in Tokyo. He was able to study chemistry in Berlin under Professor Isidor Traube. While in Germany he learned of Jaroslav Heyrovský's research in electrochemistry, and joined his team in 1923. Shikata and Heyrovský built their first polarograph in 1924.

After being made Professor, Masuzo held the chair of Professor of Wood Chemistry in the Agricultural Chemistry department at Kyoto University and was chair from the first establishment in 1927 of Kyoto University's Chemical Research Institute.

During World War II he was dispatched to Manchukuo in Japanese-occupied China. When he returned in 1954, he was made Professor at Nagoya University and he stayed there until he retired in 1959.

While living his retirement in Nagoya, he fell ill and went back to Kyoto, where he died of an apoplectic, or hemorrhagic, stroke.
