= Noritaka Hidaka =

Japanese footballer

Noritaka Hidaka 日高 憲敬
Personal information
- Full name: Noritaka Hidaka
- Date of birth: May 29, 1947 (age 79)
- Place of birth: Tokyo, Japan
- Position: Forward

Youth career
- Saitama Urawa High School
- Rikkyo University

Senior career*
| Years | Team | Apps | (Gls) |
| 1971–1977 | Nippon Steel | 114 | (50) |
| Total | | 114 | (50) |

International career
| 1972–1973 | Japan | 4 | (0) |
- * Club domestic league appearances and goals

Noritaka Hidaka (日高 憲敬, Hidaka Noritaka; born May 29, 1947) is a former Japanese football player. He played for Japan national team.

== Club career ==
Hidaka was born in Tokyo on May 29, 1947. When he was a Rikkyo University student, he won the 2nd place at 1969 Emperor's Cup. This is last finalist as university team in Emperor's Cup. After graduating from Rikkyo University, he joined Nippon Steel in 1971. He retired in 1977. He played 114 games and scored 50 goals in the league.

== National team career ==
On September 14, 1972, Hidaka debuted for Japan national team against South Korea. In 1973, he also played at 1974 World Cup qualification. He played 4 games for Japan until 1973.

== National team statistics ==
Japan national team
| Year | Apps | Goals |
|---|---|---|
| 1972 | 1 | 0 |
| 1973 | 3 | 0 |
| Total | 4 | 0 |
