= Masuzo Madono =

Japanese footballer

Masuzo Madono 真殿 益蔵
Personal information
- Full name: Masuzo Madono
- Place of birth: Empire of Japan
- Position: Midfielder

Youth career
- Kwansei Gakuin University

International career
Years	Team	Apps	(Gls)
1925	Japan	2	(0)

Masuzo Madono (真殿 益蔵, Madono Masuzo) was a Japanese football player. He played for the Japan national team.

== National team career ==
In May 1925, when Madono was a Kwansei Gakuin University student, he was selected Japan national team for 1925 Far Eastern Championship Games in Manila. At this competition, on May 17, he debuted against Philippines. On May 20, he also played against Republic of China. But Japan lost in both matches (0-4, v Philippines and 0-2, v Republic of China). He played 2 games for Japan in 1925.

== National team statistics ==
Japan national team
Year	Apps	Goals
1925	2	0
Total	2	0
