= 1928 Emperor's Cup =

Japanese football tournament

Tournament details
- Country: Japan
- Teams: 7

Final positions
- Champions: Waseda University WMW (1st title)
- Runners-up: Imperial University of Kyoto
- Semifinalists: Imperial University of Tohoku; Keio BRB

Tournament statistics
- Matches played: 6
- Goals scored: 31 (5.17 per match)

The 1928 Emperor's Cup was the 7th edition of the Emperor's Cup competition.

== Overview ==
It was contested by 7 teams, and Waseda University WMW won the cup.

== Results ==
=== Quarterfinals ===
- Imperial University of Kyoto 8–0 Jintsu Secondary School
- Keio BRB 2–1 Hiroshima Koto-shihan
- Nagoya Technical College 0–2 Waseda University WMW

=== Semifinals ===
- Imperial University of Kyoto 5–0 Imperial University of Tohoku
- Keio BRB 1–5 Waseda University WMW

=== Final ===
- Imperial University of Kyoto 1–6 Waseda University WMW

Waseda University WMW won the cup.
