= Yanosuke Watanabe =

Japanese footballer

Yanosuke Watanabe 渡邊 彌之助
Personal information
- Full name: Yanosuke Watanabe
- Place of birth: Empire of Japan
- Position: Goalkeeper

Youth career
- Kwansei Gakuin University

International career
Years	Team	Apps	(Gls)
1925	Japan	2	(0)

Yanosuke Watanabe (渡邊 彌之助, Watanabe Yanosuke) was a Japanese football player. He played for Japan national team.

== National team career ==
In May 1925, when Watanabe was a Kwansei Gakuin University student, he was selected Japan national team for 1925 Far Eastern Championship Games in Manila. At this competition, on May 17, he debuted against Philippines. On May 20, he also played against Republic of China. But Japan lost in both matches (0-4, v Philippines and 0-2, v Republic of China). He played 2 games for Japan in 1925.

== National team statistics ==
Japan national team
Year	Apps	Goals
1925	2	0
Total	2	0
