= Kinjiro Shimizu =

Japanese footballer

Kinjiro Shimizu 清水 金二郎
Personal information
- Full name: Kinjiro Shimizu
- Place of birth: Japan
- Position: Forward

Youth career
- Kwansei Gakuin University

International career
Years	Team	Apps	(Gls)
1925	Japan	1	(0)

Kinjiro Shimizu (清水 金二郎, Shimizu Kinjirō) was a Japanese football player. He played for Japan national team.

== National team career ==
In May 1925, when Shimizu was a Kwansei Gakuin University student, he was selected Japan national team for 1925 Far Eastern Championship Games in Manila. At this competition, on May 20, he debuted against Republic of China. But Japan lost in this match (0-2).

== National team statistics ==
Japan national team
Year	Apps	Goals
1925	1	0
Total	1	0
