= Yasukazu Tanaka =

Japanese footballer

Yasukazu Tanaka 田中 雍和
Personal information
- Full name: Yasukazu Tanaka
- Date of birth: June 15, 1933 (age 93)
- Place of birth: Empire of Japan
- Position: Forward

Youth career
- Hiroshima Kokutaiji High School
- Chuo University

Senior career*
Years	Team	Apps	(Gls)
- Toyo Industries

International career
1955	Japan	4	(0)
- * Club domestic league appearances and goals

Yasukazu Tanaka (田中 雍和, Tanaka Yasukazu; born June 15, 1933) is a former Japanese football player. He played for Japan national team.

== Club career ==
Tanaka was born on June 15, 1933. When he was a Chuo University student, he won the 2nd place at 1955 Emperor's Cup with Ken Naganuma, Masao Uchino and so on. After graduating from university, he played for Toyo Industries.

== National team career ==
On January 2, 1955, when Tanaka was a Chuo University student, he debuted for Japan national team against Burma. He played 4 games for Japan in 1955.

== National team statistics ==
Japan national team
Year	Apps	Goals
1955	4	0
Total	4	0
