= Osaka City Ground =

Athletic stadium in Osaka, Japan

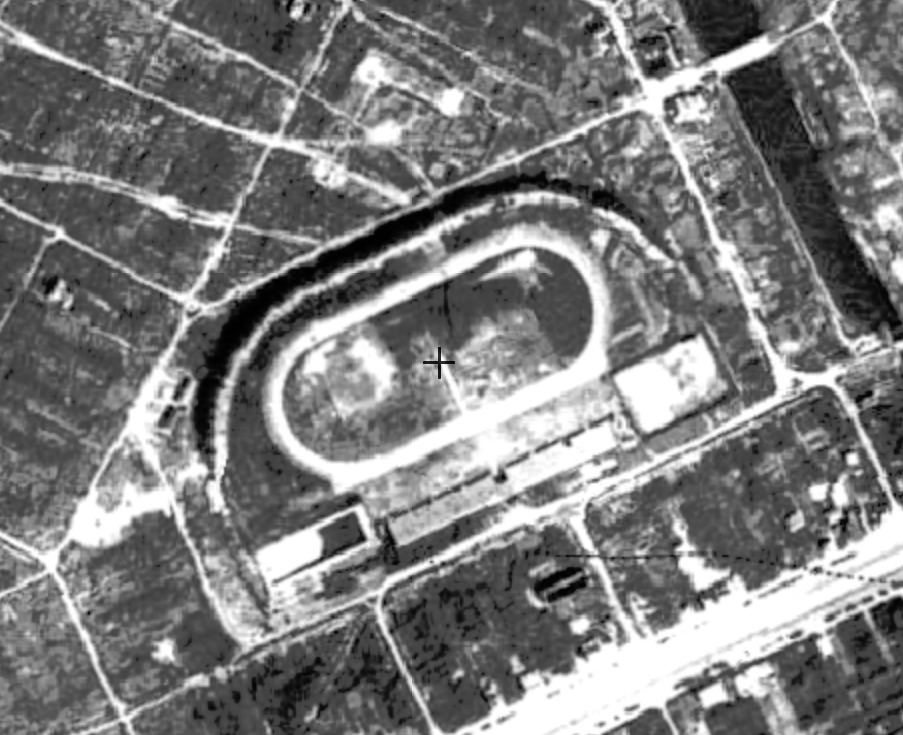
- Location: Osaka, Osaka, Japan
- Owner: Osaka City
- Capacity: 27,000

Construction
- Opened: 1923
- Closed: 1964

Osaka City Ground (大阪市立運動場) was an athletic stadium in Osaka, Osaka, Japan.

It was used as a football stadium for the 1923 Far Eastern Games. It was said to have a seating capacity of 20,000 in 1923.
