= Kiyonosuke Marutani =

Japanese footballer

Kiyonosuke Marutani 丸谷 清之介
Personal information
- Full name: Kiyonosuke Marutani
- Place of birth: Empire of Japan
- Position: Midfielder

Senior career*
Years	Team	Apps	(Gls)
- Osaka SC

International career
1925	Japan	1	(0)
- * Club domestic league appearances and goals

Kiyonosuke Marutani (丸谷 清之介, Marutani Kiyonosuke) was a Japanese football player. He played for Japan national team.

== Club career ==
Marutani played for Osaka SC was founded by his alma mater high school graduates and many Japan national team players Yoshimatsu Oyama, Toshio Miyaji, Uichiro Hatta and Sakae Takahashi were playing in those days.

== National team career ==
In May 1925, Marutani was selected Japan national team for 1925 Far Eastern Championship Games in Manila. At this competition, on May 20, he debuted against Republic of China. But Japan lost in this match (0-2).

== National team statistics ==
Japan national team
Year	Apps	Goals
1925	1	0
Total	1	0
