= Sakae Takahashi (footballer) =

Japanese footballer

Sakae Takahashi 高橋 栄
Personal information
- Full name: Sakae Takahashi
- Place of birth: Empire of Japan
- Position: Defender

Senior career*
Years	Team	Apps	(Gls)
- Osaka SC

International career
1925	Japan	1	(0)
- * Club domestic league appearances and goals

Sakae Takahashi (高橋 栄, Takahashi Sakae) was a Japanese football player. He played for Japan national team.

== Club career ==
Takahashi played for Osaka SC where many Japan national team players like Yoshimatsu Oyama, Toshio Miyaji, Uichiro Hatta and Kiyonosuke Marutani were playing in those days.

== National team career ==
In May 1925, Takahashi was selected for the Japan national team for the 1925 Far Eastern Championship Games in Manila. At this competition, on May 20, he debuted against Republic of China, but Japan lost in the match (0-2).

== National team statistics ==
Japan national team
Year	Apps	Goals
1925	1	0
Total	1	0
