= Toshio Miyaji =

Japanese footballer

Toshio Miyaji 宮地 利雄
Personal information
- Full name: Toshio Miyaji
- Place of birth: Empire of Japan
- Position: Midfielder

Senior career*
Years	Team	Apps	(Gls)
- Osaka SC

International career
1925	Japan	2	(0)
- * Club domestic league appearances and goals

Toshio Miyaji (宮地 利雄, Miyaji Toshio) was a Japanese football player. He played for Japan national team.

== Club career ==
Miyaji played for Osaka SC many Japan national team players Yoshimatsu Oyama, Uichiro Hatta, Sakae Takahashi and Kiyonosuke Marutani were playing in those days.

== National team career ==
In May 1925, Miyaji was selected Japan national team for 1925 Far Eastern Championship Games in Manila. At this competition, on May 17, he debuted against Philippines. On May 20, he also played against Republic of China. But Japan lost in both matches (0-4, v Philippines and 0-2, v Republic of China). He played 2 games for Japan in 1925.

== National team statistics ==
Japan national team
Year	Apps	Goals
1925	2	0
Total	2	0
