= Uichiro Hatta =

Japanese footballer

Uichiro Hatta 八田 卯一郎
Personal information
- Full name: Uichiro Hatta
- Date of birth: September 10, 1903
- Place of birth: Osaka, Osaka, Empire of Japan
- Date of death: April 20, 1989 (aged 85)
- Place of death: Fujisawa, Kanagawa, Japan
- Position: Midfielder

Youth career
- Meisei Commercial High School

Senior career*
Years	Team	Apps	(Gls)
1921–????	Osaka SC		

International career
1925	Japan	2	(0)
- * Club domestic league appearances and goals

Uichiro Hatta (八田 卯一郎, Hatta Uichirō; September 10, 1903 – April 20, 1989) was a Japanese football player. He played for Japan national team.

== Club career ==
Hatta was born in Osaka on September 10, 1903. He played for Osaka SC was founded by his alma mater high school graduates and many Japan national team players Yoshimatsu Oyama, Toshio Miyaji, Sakae Takahashi and Kiyonosuke Marutani were playing in those days.

== National team career ==
In May 1925, Hatta was selected Japan national team for 1925 Far Eastern Championship Games in Manila. At this competition, on May 17, he debuted against Philippines. On May 20, he also played against Republic of China. But Japan lost in both matches (0-4, v Philippines and 0-2, v Republic of China). He played 2 games for Japan in 1925.

== After retirement ==
After retirement, Hatta entered Tokyo Imperial University and studied law. He graduated from university in 1930 and he became a judge. He worked at Tokyo District Court and so on.

April 20, 1989, Hatta died of heart failure in Fujisawa at the age of 85.

== National team statistics ==
Japan national team
Year	Apps	Goals
1925	2	0
Total	2	0
