= Waseda University Junior and Senior High School =

- 早稲田大学高等学院・中学部
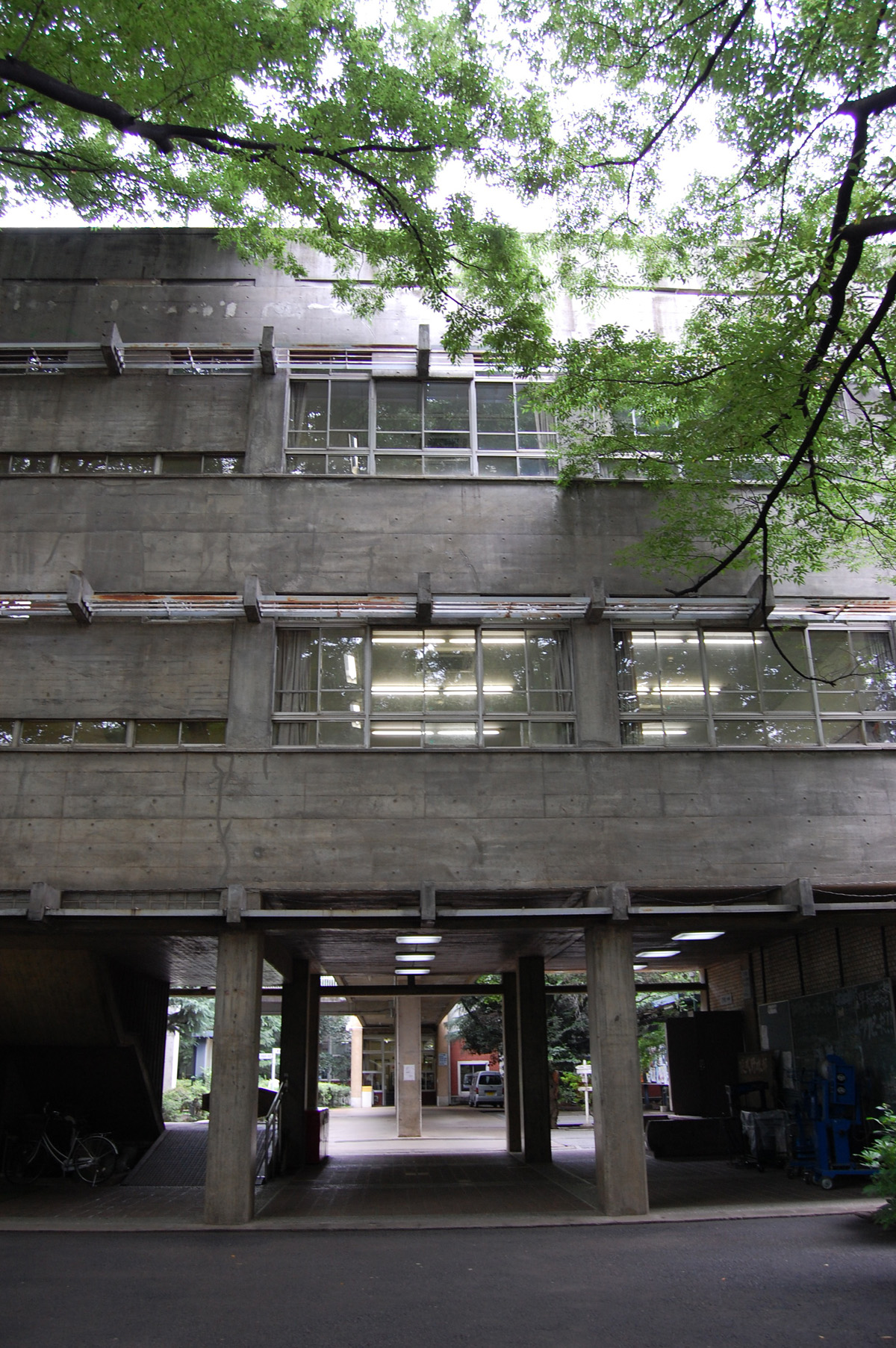

Location
- 3-31-1 Kamishakujii, Nerima-ku, Tokyo 177-0044 Japan. Nerima, Tokyo; Japan; 35°42′33.13″N 139°43′9.6″E

Information
- Type: Private
- Motto: 学問の独立 (Independence of Learning)
- Established: 1920
- President: Hiroshi Yamanishi
- Enrollment: 1,500
- Color: Maroon
- Mascot: Waseda Bear (same as Waseda University)
- Endowment: N/A
- Affiliations: Super Science High School
- Website: https://www.waseda.jp/school/shs/

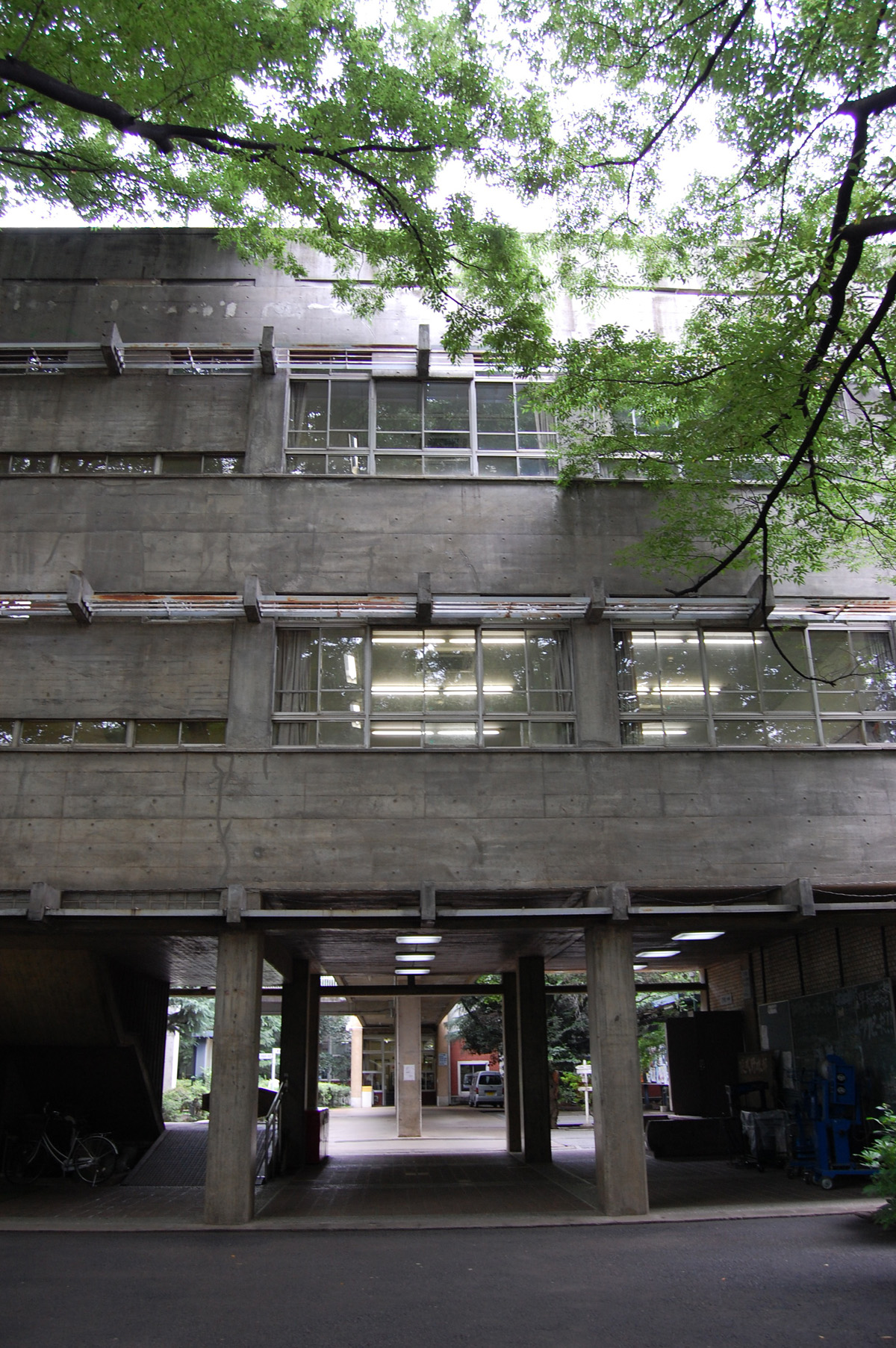
Waseda University Senior High School

Waseda University Junior and Senior High School (早稲田大学高等学院・中学部, Waseda Daigaku Kōtō Gakuin Chūgakubu) is a junior and high school in Japan, located in Tokyo. It was founded in 1920 as a high school affiliated to Waseda University.

== Overview ==
The school is one of two directly affiliated (附属) schools of Waseda University along with Waseda University Honjo Senior High School.

The school was originally founded as Daigaku Yoka (the preparatory course of the university) in 1920 under the old system and re-established in 1949 as a high school following the educational reform.

Its junior high school was established in 2010 as the first junior high school directly operated by the school corporation Waseda University, accepting 120 students per year across four classes.

== Notable alumni ==
=== Politicians ===
- Hirotaka Akamatsu
- Tanzan Ishibashi
- Tadahiko Ito
- Akira Kazami
- Yōhei Kōno
- Noboru Takeshita
- Kensuke Miyazaki
- Yukio Aoshima

=== Businessmen ===
- Nobuyuki Idei
- Masaru Ibuka
- Yusaku Maezawa

=== Academics ===
- Fukui Fumimasa
- Tomio Hora

=== Writers ===
- Tatsuzō Ishikawa
- Kosuke Gomi
- Hidemitsu Tanaka
- Fumio Niwa
- Yoshinaga Fujita
- Ashihei Hino
- Mitsuharu Kaneko
- Yoshiki Hayama
- Isamu Yoshii
- Aizu Yaichi
- Santōka Taneda

=== Actors ===
- Takeshi Kato
- Masahiko Tsugawa
- Hisaya Morishige

=== Musicians ===
- Hachidai Nakamura
- Satoshi Tomiie

=== Filmmakers ===
- Takeshi Furusawa
- Satsuo Yamamoto
- Sōjirō Motoki

=== Athletes ===
- Kisshomaru Ueshiba
- Onishi Tetsunosuke
- Taizo Kawamoto
- Takashi Kondo
- Jiro Sato
- Katsuo Takaishi
- Atsushi Tani
- Akira Fujita
- Tadao Horie
- Tōru Mori

=== Others ===
- Hajime Takano, journalist
- Oki Sato, architect
- Daisuke Nanba, assassin
- Fumihiro Joyu, Aum Shinrikyo spokesperson
- Kenichi Hirose, Aum Shinrikyo affiliate

== See also ==
- List of high schools in Tokyo

== Related books ==
- 早稲田大学高等学院編『三十周年記念誌 : 1979』(Japanese), published in 1980
- 早稲田大学高等学院編『継承そして創造 : 五十年の軌跡-未来に向けて』 (Japanese), published in 1999
- 早稲田大学高等学院米式蹴球部OB会編『半世紀の道のり : 早稲田大学高等学院米式蹴球部50年史』(Japanese), published in 2000
