= Michiyo Taki =

Japanese footballer

Michiyo Taki 瀧 通世
Personal information
- Full name: Michiyo Taki
- Place of birth: Empire of Japan
- Position: Forward

Youth career
- Waseda University High School

International career
Years	Team	Apps	(Gls)
1927	Japan	1	(0)

Michiyo Taki (瀧 通世, Taki Michiyo) was a Japanese football player. He played for Japan national team.

== National team career ==
In August 1927, when Taki was a Waseda University High School student, he was selected Japan national team for 1927 Far Eastern Championship Games in Shanghai. At this competition, on August 29, he debuted against Philippines and Japan won this match. This is Japan national team's first victory in International A Match.

== National team statistics ==
Japan national team
Year	Apps	Goals
1927	1	0
Total	1	0
