= Shigeru Takahashi =

Japanese footballer

Shigeru Takahashi 高橋 茂
Personal information
- Full name: Shigeru Takahashi
- Place of birth: Empire of Japan
- Position: Forward

Youth career
- Waseda University

International career
Years	Team	Apps	(Gls)
1927	Japan	2	(0)

Shigeru Takahashi (高橋 茂, Takahashi Shigeru) was a Japanese football player. He played for Japan national team.

== National team career ==
In August 1927, when Takahashi was a Waseda University student, he was selected Japan national team for 1927 Far Eastern Championship Games in Shanghai. At this competition, on August 27, he debuted against Republic of China. On August 29, he also played against Philippines and Japan won this match. This is Japan national team first victory in International A Match. He played 2 games for Japan in 1927.

== National team statistics ==
Japan national team
Year	Apps	Goals
1927	2	0
Total	2	0
