= Tamotsu Asakura =

Japanese footballer

Tamotsu Asakura 朝倉 保
Personal information
- Full name: Tamotsu Asakura
- Place of birth: Empire of Japan
- Position: Midfielder

Youth career
- Waseda University

International career
Years	Team	Apps	(Gls)
1927	Japan	2	(0)

Tamotsu Asakura (朝倉 保, Asakura Tamotsu) was a Japanese football player. He played for the Japan national team.

== National team career ==
In August 1927, when Asakura was a Waseda University student, he was selected Japan national team for 1927 Far Eastern Championship Games in Shanghai. At this competition, on August 27, he debuted against Republic of China. On August 29, he also played against Philippines and Japan won this match. This is Japan national team first victory in International A Match. He played 2 games for Japan in 1927.

== National team statistics ==
Japan national team
Year	Apps	Goals
1927	2	0
Total	2	0
