= Football at the 1923 Far Eastern Championship Games =

1923 Far Eastern Championship Games
Tournament details
- Host country: Japan
- Teams: 3
- Venue: (in 1 host city)

Final positions
- Champions: China (5th title)

Tournament statistics
- Matches played: 3
- Goals scored: 11 (3.67 per match)
- Top scorer(s): (Beiyang government) Wong Pak Chung (Beiyang government) Yip Kao Ko (3 goals)

The football sporting event at the 1923 Far Eastern Championship Games featured matches between China, Japan and the Philippines.

== Results ==
Team	Pld	W	D	L	GF	GA	GD	Pts
(Beiyang government) China	2	2	0	0	8	1	7	4
Philippines	2	1	0	1	2	4	–2	2
Japan	2	0	0	2	2	7	–5	0

22 May 1923

(Beiyang government) China	3–0	Philippines
Pak Chung 11' ? ?	Report

Osaka City Ground, Osaka
Referee: Hiroshi Saburo Takeuchi (Japan)

23 May 1923

Japan	1–2	Philippines
Shimizu 5'	Report

Osaka City Ground, Osaka
Referee: Hiroshi Saburo Takeuchi (Japan)

24 May 1923

Japan	1–5	(Beiyang government) China
Shimizu 15'	Report	Pak Chung 1', 42'; Kao Ko 10', ?', 46'

Osaka City Ground, Osaka
Referee: Hiroshi Saburo Takeuchi (Japan)

== Winner ==
1923 Far Eastern Games Football champions

China
Fifth title

== Statistics ==
=== Goalscorers ===
There were 12 goals scored in 3 matches, for an average of 4 goals per match.

3 goals

- (Beiyang government) Wong Pak Chung
- (Beiyang government) Yip Kao Ko

2 goals

- (Japan) Ryuzo Shimizu

== See also ==
Football at the Summer Olympics
Football at the 1935 Central American and Caribbean Games
