= Football at the 1927 Far Eastern Championship Games =

1927 Far Eastern Championship Games
Tournament details
- Host country: China
- Teams: 3
- Venue: (in 1 host city)

Final positions
- Champions: China (7th title)

Tournament statistics
- Matches played: 3
- Goals scored: 13 (4.33 per match)
- Top scorer: (Republic of China (1912–1949)) Suen Kam Shun (4 goals)

The football sporting event at the 1927 Far Eastern Championship Games featured matches between China, Japan and the Philippines.

A brawl occurred in the final match.

== Results ==
Team	Pld	W	D	L	GF	GA	GD	Pts
(Republic of China (1912–1949)) China	2	2	0	0	8	2	6	4
Japan	2	1	0	1	3	6	–3	2
Philippines	2	0	0	2	2	5	–3	0

27 August 1927

(Republic of China (1912–1949)) China	5–1	Japan
Suen Kam Shun 19', 30'; Cai Bingfen 21' (?), 73'	Report	Tamai 41'

Zhonghua Stadium, Shanghai
Attendance: 15,000
Referee: Du Lianke (China)

29 August 1927

Japan	2–1	Philippines
Suzuki 70'; Takenokoshi 75'	Report	? (?)

Zhonghua Stadium, Shanghai

31 August 1927

(Republic of China (1912–1949)) China	3–1	Philippines
Suen Kam Shun (?); Chen Huanxian (?)	Report

Zhonghua Stadium, Shanghai
Referee: Du Lianke (China)

== Winner ==
1927 Far Eastern Games Football champions

China
Seventh title

== Statistics ==
=== Goalscorers ===
There were 13 goals scored in 3 matches, for an average of 4.33 goals per match.

4 goals

- (Republic of China (1912–1949)) Suen Kam Shun

3 goals

- (Republic of China (1912–1949)) Cai Bingfen

1 goal

- (Republic of China (1912–1949)) Chen Huanxian
- (Japan) Misao Tamai
