= Japan national football team results (1917–1939) =

This article lists the results for the Japan national football team between 1917 and 1939.

== 1917 ==
Date	Opponent	Result	Score	Venue	Competition	Source
9 May 1917	China	L	0–5	Shibaura Stadium, Tokyo, Japan	Far Eastern Games	
10 May 1917	Philippines	L	2–15	Shibaura Stadium, Tokyo, Japan	Far Eastern Games	

== 1921 ==
Date	Opponent	Result	Score	Venue	Competition
30 May 1921	Philippines	L	1–3	(Beiyang government) Shanghai, China	Far Eastern Games
1 June 1921	China	L	0–4	(Beiyang government) Shanghai, China	Far Eastern Games

== 1923 ==
Date	Opponent	Result	Score	Venue	Competition	References
23 May 1923	Philippines	L	1–2	Municipal Stadium, Osaka, Japan	Far Eastern Games	
24 May 1923	China	L	1–5	Municipal Stadium, Osaka, Japan	Far Eastern Games	

== 1925 ==
Date	Opponent	Result	Score	Venue	Competition	References
17 May 1925	Philippines	L	0–4	Manila, Philippines	Far Eastern Games	
20 May 1925	China	L	0–2	Manila, Philippines	Far Eastern Games	

== 1927 ==
Date	Opponent	Result	Score	Venue	Competition	References
27 August 1927	China	L	1–5	(Beiyang government) Shanghai, China	Far Eastern Games	
29 August 1927	Philippines	W	2–1	(Beiyang government) Shanghai, China	Far Eastern Games	

== 1930 ==
Date	Opponent	Result	Score	Venue	Competition	References
25 May 1930	Philippines	W	7–2	Meiji Jingu Gaien Stadium, Tokyo, Japan	Far Eastern Games	
29 May 1930	China	D	3–3	Meiji Jingu Gaien Stadium, Tokyo, Japan	Far Eastern Games	

== 1934 ==
Date	Opponent	Result	Score	Venue	Competition	References
13 May 1934	Dutch East Indies	L	1–7	Rizal Memorial Stadium, Manila, Philippines	Far Eastern Games	
15 May 1934	Philippines	W	4–3	Rizal Memorial Stadium, Manila, Philippines	Far Eastern Games	
20 May 1934	China	L	3–4	Rizal Memorial Stadium, Manila, Philippines	Far Eastern Games	

== 1936 ==
Date	Opponent	Result	Score	Venue	Competition	References
4 August 1936	Sweden	W	3–2	Hertha-BSC-Platz, Berlin, Germany	1936 Olympic Games Football Matches	
7 August 1936	Italy	L	0–8	Mommsenstadion, Berlin, Germany	1936 Olympic Games Football Matches	

== 1939 ==
Because the opponents were considered to be puppet states and not internationally recognized, the matches were not recorded by FIFA.

Date	Opponent	Result	Score	Venue	Competition
2 September 1939	Reorganized National Government of China	W	3–0	Xinjing, Manchukuo	International Friendly
3 September 1939	Manchukuo	W	6–0	Xinjing, Manchukuo	International Friendly
