= List of Japanese football champions =

Japanese football champions

Japanese League (1st tier)

Japan Soccer League (1965–1971) Japan Soccer League Division 1 (1972–1992) J.League (1993–1998) J.League Division 1 (1999–2014) J1 League (2015–present)
- Country
- Japan
- Founded
- 1965
- Number of teams
- 20 (2024)
- Current champions
- Kashima Antlers (2025)
- Most successful club
- Kashima Antlers (9 titles)

The Japanese football champions are the winners of the top league in Japan, the Japan Soccer League from 1965 to 1992 and the J.League since then.

Sanfrecce Hiroshima and Tokyo Verdy are the only teams that have won the title four times in a row (in 1965–1968 as Toyo Industries and in 1991–1994 as Yomiuri S.C./Verdy Kawasaki, respectively). Notice that from 1985 to 1992 Japanese football adjusted to the "fall-spring" season schedule (common in most of Europe) but after establishment of J.League switched back to "spring-fall" scheme (common in North America, East Asia, and Nordic European latitudes).

== List of champions ==
Teams in bold have completed the double of the title and the Emperor's Cup in the same season. In 1985 no double was possible due to the season's timeframe change; thus, the doubles completed between then and 1992 are won in the middle of the season.

Numbers in parentheses indicate number of wins at the date. Leading goalscorer's nationality is at the time of award and does not necessarily indicate the national team played for.

=== Before the professional era (1965–1992) ===
==== Japan Soccer League (1965–1971) ====
Season	Champions (number of titles)	Runners-up	Third place	Leading goalscorer	Goals
1965	**Toyo Industries**	Yawata Steel	Furukawa Electric	(Japan) Mutsuhiko Nomura (Hitachi)	15
1966	Toyo Industries (2)	Yawata Steel	Furukawa Electric	(Japan) Aritatsu Ogi (Toyo Industries)	14
1967	**Toyo Industries** (3)	Furukawa Electric	Mitsubishi Heavy Industries	(Japan) Takeo Kimura (Furukawa Electric)	15
1968	Toyo Industries (4)	Yanmar Diesel	Mitsubishi Heavy Industries	(Japan) Kunishige Kamamoto (Yanmar Diesel)	14
1969	Mitsubishi Heavy Industries	Toyo Industries	Yawata Steel	(Japan) Hiroshi Ochiai (Mitsubishi Motors)	12
1970	Toyo Industries (5)	Mitsubishi Heavy Industries	Hitachi SC	(Japan) Kunishige Kamamoto (Yanmar Diesel)	16
1971	Yanmar Diesel	Mitsubishi Heavy Industries	Nippon Steel	(Japan) Kunishige Kamamoto (Yanmar Diesel)	11

==== Japan Soccer League Division 1 (1972–1992) ====
In 1972, the Japan Soccer League expanded to two divisions with the introduction of a Second Division, and the top flight became known as the Japan Soccer League Division 1.

Season	Champions (number of titles)	Runners-up	Third place	Leading goalscorer	Goals
1972	**Hitachi SC**	Yanmar Diesel	Toyo Industries	(Japan) Akira Matsunaga (Hitachi)	12
1973	**Mitsubishi Heavy Industries** (2)	Hitachi SC	Yanmar Diesel	(Japan) Akira Matsunaga (Hitachi)	11
1974	**Yanmar Diesel** (2)	Mitsubishi Heavy Industries	Hitachi SC	(Japan) Kunishige Kamamoto (Yanmar Diesel)	21
1975	Yanmar Diesel (3)	Mitsubishi Heavy Industries	Hitachi SC	(Japan) Kunishige Kamamoto (Yanmar Diesel)	17
1976	**Furukawa Electric**	Mitsubishi Heavy Industries	Fujita Industries	(Japan) Kunishige Kamamoto (Yanmar Diesel)	15
1977	**Fujita Industries**	Mitsubishi Heavy Industries	Hitachi SC	(Brazil) Carvalho (Fujita Industries)	23
1978	**Mitsubishi Heavy Industries** (3)^{†}	Yanmar Diesel	Fujita Industries	(Japan) Kunishige Kamamoto (Yanmar Diesel) (Brazil) Carvalho (Fujita Industries)	15
1979	**Fujita Industries** (2)	Yomiuri SC	Hitachi SC	(Brazil) Ruy Ramos (Yomiuri)	14
1980	Yanmar Diesel (4)	Fujita Industries	Furukawa Electric	(Japan) Hiroyuki Usui (Hitachi)	14
1981	Fujita Industries (3)	Yomiuri SC	Mitsubishi Heavy Industries	(Japan) Hiroshi Yoshida (Furukawa Electric)	14
1982	Mitsubishi Heavy Industries (4)	Yanmar Diesel	Furukawa Electric	(Japan) Hiroyuki Usui (Hitachi)	13
1983	Yomiuri SC	Nissan Motors	Fujita Industries	(Brazil) Ruy Ramos (Yomiuri)	10
1984	**Yomiuri SC** (2)	Nissan Motors	Yamaha Motors	(Japan) Tetsuya Totsuka (Yomiuri)	14
1985–86	Furukawa Electric (2)	NKK SC	Honda Motors	(Japan) Hiroshi Yoshida (Furukawa Electric)	16
1986–87	**Yomiuri SC** (3)	NKK SC	Mitsubishi Heavy Industries	(Japan) Toshio Matsuura (NKK)	17
1987–88	Yamaha Motors	NKK SC	Mitsubishi Heavy Industries	(Japan) Toshio Matsuura (NKK)	11
1988–89	**Nissan Motors**^{†}	ANA SC	Yamaha Motors	(Brazil) Adílson (Yamaha Motors)	11
1989–90	**Nissan Motors** (2)^{†}	Yomiuri SC	ANA SC	(Brazil) Renato (Nissan Motors)	17
1990–91	Yomiuri SC (4)	Nissan Motors	Honda Motors	(Japan) Tetsuya Totsuka (Yomiuri) (Japan) Tsuyoshi Kitazawa (Honda Motors) (Brazil) Renato (Nissan Motors)	10
1991–92	Yomiuri SC (5)	Nissan Motors	Yamaha Motors	(Brazil) Toninho (Yomiuri)	18

^{†} Treble with the JSL Cup

=== Professional era (1993–present) ===
In 1992, the J.League was established as Japan's first professional football league. All clubs selected to participate in the new league relinquished their corporate identities and adopted independent club names.

From 1993 to 2005 (except in 1996), and again in 2015 and 2016, the league was contested under an Apertura and Clausura format. Consequently, the runners-up for those seasons are the winners of one stage who lost to the winners of the championship playoff. The third-placed club are the highest-ranked team in the aggregate table that did not participate in the playoff. If no playoff was held because the same club won both stages, the third-placed club is the team with the second-highest points total in the aggregate table.

==== J.League (1993–1998) ====
Season	Champions (number of titles)	Runners-up	Third place	Leading goalscorer	Goals
1992	Transition period; top flight clubs only play the J.League Cup, but Japan Football League plays inaugural season				
1993	Verdy Kawasaki (6)	Kashima Antlers	Shimizu S-Pulse	(Argentina) Ramón Díaz (Yokohama Marinos)	28
1994	Verdy Kawasaki (7)	Sanfrecce Hiroshima	Kashima Antlers	(Germany) Frank Ordenewitz (JEF United Ichihara)	30
1995	Yokohama Marinos (3)	Verdy Kawasaki	Nagoya Grampus Eight	(Japan) Masahiro Fukuda (Urawa Red Diamonds)	32
1996	Kashima Antlers	Nagoya Grampus Eight	Yokohama Flügels	(Japan) Kazuyoshi Miura (Verdy Kawasaki)	23
1997	Júbilo Iwata (2)	Kashima Antlers	Yokohama Marinos	(Cameroon) Patrick M'Boma (Gamba Osaka)	25
1998	Kashima Antlers (2)	Júbilo Iwata	Shimizu S-Pulse	(Japan) Masashi Nakayama (Júbilo Iwata)	36

==== J.League Division 1 (1999–2014) ====
In 1999, the J.League expanded to two divisions with the introduction of a Second Division, and the top flight became known as the J.League Division 1.

Season	Champions (number of titles)	Runners-up	Third place	Leading goalscorer	Goals
1999	Júbilo Iwata (3)	Shimizu S-Pulse	Kashiwa Reysol	(South Korea) Hwang Sun-hong (Cerezo Osaka)	24
2000	**Kashima Antlers** (3)^{†}	Yokohama F. Marinos	Kashiwa Reysol	(Japan) Masashi Nakayama (Júbilo Iwata)	20
2001	Kashima Antlers (4)	Júbilo Iwata	JEF United Ichihara	(Brazil) Will (Consadole Sapporo)	20
2002	Júbilo Iwata (4)	Yokohama F. Marinos	Gamba Osaka	(Japan) Naohiro Takahara (Júbilo Iwata)	26
2003	Yokohama F. Marinos (4)	Júbilo Iwata	JEF United Chiba	(Brazil) Ueslei (Nagoya Grampus Eight)	22
2004	Yokohama F. Marinos (5)	Urawa Red Diamonds	Gamba Osaka	(Brazil) Emerson (Urawa Red Diamonds)	27
2005	Gamba Osaka	Urawa Red Diamonds	Kashima Antlers	(Brazil) Araújo (Gamba Osaka)	33
2006	**Urawa Red Diamonds** (5)	Kawasaki Frontale	Gamba Osaka	(Brazil) Washington (Urawa Red Diamonds) (Brazil) Magno Alves (Gamba Osaka)	26
2007	**Kashima Antlers** (5)	Urawa Red Diamonds	Gamba Osaka	(Brazil) Juninho (Kawasaki Frontale)	22
2008	Kashima Antlers (6)	Kawasaki Frontale	Nagoya Grampus	(Brazil) Marquinhos (Kashima Antlers)	21
2009	Kashima Antlers (7)	Kawasaki Frontale	Gamba Osaka	(Japan) Ryoichi Maeda (Júbilo Iwata)	20
2010	Nagoya Grampus	Gamba Osaka	Cerezo Osaka	(Australia) Joshua Kennedy (Nagoya Grampus) (Japan) Ryoichi Maeda (Júbilo Iwata)	17
2011	Kashiwa Reysol (2)	Nagoya Grampus	Gamba Osaka	(Australia) Joshua Kennedy (Nagoya Grampus)	19
2012	Sanfrecce Hiroshima (6)	Vegalta Sendai	Urawa Red Diamonds	(Japan) Hisato Satō (Sanfrecce Hiroshima)	22
2013	Sanfrecce Hiroshima (7)	Yokohama F. Marinos	Kawasaki Frontale	(Japan) Yoshito Ōkubo (Kawasaki Frontale)	26
2014	**Gamba Osaka** (2)^{†}	Urawa Red Diamonds	Kashima Antlers	(Japan) Yoshito Ōkubo (Kawasaki Frontale)	18

^{†} Treble with the J.League Cup

==== J1 League (2015–present) ====
In 2015, the J.League Division 1 was renamed the J1 League.

Season	Champions (number of titles)	Runners-up	Third place	Leading goalscorer	Goals
2015	Sanfrecce Hiroshima (8)	Gamba Osaka	Urawa Red Diamonds	(Japan) Yoshito Ōkubo (Kawasaki Frontale)	23
2016	**Kashima Antlers** (8)	Urawa Red Diamonds	Kawasaki Frontale	(Brazil) Leandro (Vissel Kobe) (Nigeria) Peter Utaka (Sanfrecce Hiroshima)	19
2017	Kawasaki Frontale	Kashima Antlers	Cerezo Osaka	(Japan) Yū Kobayashi (Kawasaki Frontale)	23
2018	Kawasaki Frontale (2)	Sanfrecce Hiroshima	Kashima Antlers	(Brazil) Jô (Nagoya Grampus)	24
2019	Yokohama F. Marinos (6)	FC Tokyo	Kashima Antlers	(Japan) Teruhito Nakagawa (Yokohama F. Marinos) (Brazil) Marcos Júnior (Yokohama F. Marinos)	15
2020	**Kawasaki Frontale** (3)	Gamba Osaka	Nagoya Grampus	(Kenya) Michael Olunga (Kashiwa Reysol)	28
2021	Kawasaki Frontale (4)	Yokohama F. Marinos	Vissel Kobe	(Brazil) Leandro Damião (Kawasaki Frontale) (Japan) Daizen Maeda (Yokohama F. Marinos)	23
2022	Yokohama F. Marinos (7)	Kawasaki Frontale	Sanfrecce Hiroshima	(Brazil) Thiago Santana (Shimizu S-Pulse)	14
2023	Vissel Kobe	Yokohama F. Marinos	Sanfrecce Hiroshima	(Brazil) Anderson Lopes (Yokohama F. Marinos) (Japan) Yuya Osako (Vissel Kobe)	22
2024	**Vissel Kobe** (2)	Sanfrecce Hiroshima	Machida Zelvia	(Brazil) Anderson Lopes (Yokohama F. Marinos)	24
2025	Kashima Antlers (9)	Kashiwa Reysol	Kyoto Sanga	(Brazil) Léo Ceará (Kashima Antlers)	21

== Total titles won ==
Location of Japanese football champions
Japanese football champions in the Greater Tokyo Area

Fourteen clubs have won the Japanese top flight title, although only eleven have been champions since the establishment of the J.League. Of those eleven clubs, Kashima Antlers, Gamba Osaka, Nagoya Grampus, Kawasaki Frontale, and Vissel Kobe have never won the Japan Soccer League title. Of these, Vissel Kobe never competed in the former Japan Soccer League Division 1.

All Japanese champion clubs still exist and currently compete in the J.League. However, some have relocated from the cities in which they won their Japan Soccer League titles, while others have severed ties with their original parent companies.

Clubs in bold compete in the J1 League as of the 2026–27 season. Italics indicates defunct clubs.

=== Professional J.League era (1993–present) ===
Club	Champions	Runners-up	Winning seasons	Runners-up seasons
**Kashima Antlers**	9	3	1996, 1998, 2000, 2001, 2007, 2008, 2009, 2016, 2025	1993, 1997, 2017
**Yokohama F. Marinos**	5	5	1995, 2003, 2004, 2019, 2022	2000, 2002, 2013, 2021, 2023
**Kawasaki Frontale**	4	4	2017, 2018, 2020, 2021	2006, 2008, 2009, 2022
Júbilo Iwata	3	3	1997, 1999, 2002	1998, 2001, 2003
**Sanfrecce Hiroshima**	3	3	2012, 2013, 2015	1994, 2018, 2024
**Gamba Osaka**	2	3	2005, 2014	2010, 2015, 2020
**Tokyo Verdy**	2	1	1993, 1994	1995
**Vissel Kobe**	2	0	2023, 2024	
**Urawa Red Diamonds**	1	5	2006	2004, 2005, 2007, 2014, 2016
**Nagoya Grampus**	1	2	2010	1996, 2011
**Kashiwa Reysol**	1	1	2011	2025
**Shimizu S-Pulse**	0	1		1999
Vegalta Sendai	0	1		2012
**FC Tokyo**	0	1		2019

=== All-time (1965–present) ===
Club	Champions	Runners-up	Winning seasons	Runners-up seasons
**Kashima Antlers**	9	3	1996, 1998, 2000, 2001, 2007, 2008, 2009, 2016, 2025	1993, 1997, 2017
**Sanfrecce Hiroshima**	8	4	1965, 1966, 1967, 1968, 1970, 2012, 2013, 2015	1969, 1994, 2018, 2024
**Yokohama F. Marinos**	7	9	1988–89, 1989–90, 1995, 2003, 2004, 2019, 2022	1983, 1984, 1990–91, 1991–92, 2000, 2002, 2013, 2021, 2023
**Tokyo Verdy**	7	4	1983, 1984, 1986–87, 1990–91, 1991–92, 1993, 1994	1979, 1981, 1989–90, 1995
**Urawa Red Diamonds**	5	11	1969, 1973, 1978, 1982, 2006	1970, 1971, 1974, 1975, 1976, 1977, 2004, 2005, 2007, 2014, 2016
**Cerezo Osaka**	4	4	1971, 1974, 1975, 1980	1968, 1972, 1978, 1982
**Kawasaki Frontale**	4	4	2017, 2018, 2020, 2021	2006, 2008, 2009, 2022
Júbilo Iwata	4	3	1987–88, 1997, 1999, 2002	1998, 2001, 2003
Shonan Bellmare	3	1	1977, 1979, 1981	1980
**Gamba Osaka**	2	3	2005, 2014	2010, 2015, 2020
**Kashiwa Reysol**	2	2	1972, 2011	1973, 2025
**JEF United Chiba**	2	1	1976, 1985–86	1967
**Vissel Kobe**	2	0	2023, 2024	
**Nagoya Grampus**	1	2	2010	1996, 2011
NKK SC	0	3		1985–86, 1986–87, 1987–88
Nippon Steel Yawata	0	2		1965, 1966
Yokohama Flügels	0	1		1988–89
**Shimizu S-Pulse**	0	1		1999
Vegalta Sendai	0	1		2012
**FC Tokyo**	0	1		2019

== Total titles won by prefecture ==
This is a breakdown of titles won by prefecture. As some clubs have relocated between cities both before and during the J.League era, titles are attributed to the prefectures in which the clubs are currently based. Sanfrecce Hiroshima, Júbilo Iwata, Yokohama F. Marinos, Cerezo Osaka, Nagoya Grampus, and Kawasaki Frontale are the only champion clubs that have remained based in their respective cities throughout their histories.

=== Professional J.League era (1993–present) ===
Prefecture	Number of titles	Clubs
(Ibaraki Prefecture) Ibaraki	9	Kashima Antlers (9)
(Kanagawa Prefecture) Kanagawa	9	Yokohama F. Marinos (5), Kawasaki Frontale (4)
(Shizuoka Prefecture) Shizuoka	3	Júbilo Iwata (3)
(Hiroshima Prefecture) Hiroshima	3	Sanfrecce Hiroshima (3)
(Osaka Prefecture) Osaka	2	Gamba Osaka (2)
Tokyo	2	Tokyo Verdy (2)
(Hyōgo Prefecture) Hyōgo	3	Vissel Kobe (3)
(Saitama Prefecture) Saitama	1	Urawa Red Diamonds (1)
(Aichi Prefecture) Aichi	1	Nagoya Grampus (1)
(Chiba Prefecture) Chiba	1	Kashiwa Reysol (1)

=== All-time (1965–present) ===
Prefecture	Number of titles	Clubs
(Kanagawa Prefecture) Kanagawa	14	Yokohama F. Marinos (7), Kawasaki Frontale (4), Shonan Bellmare (3)
(Ibaraki Prefecture) Ibaraki	9	Kashima Antlers (9)
(Hiroshima Prefecture) Hiroshima	8	Sanfrecce Hiroshima (8)
Tokyo	7	Tokyo Verdy (7)
(Osaka Prefecture) Osaka	6	Cerezo Osaka (4), Gamba Osaka (2)
(Saitama Prefecture) Saitama	5	Urawa Red Diamonds (5)
(Shizuoka Prefecture) Shizuoka	4	Júbilo Iwata (4)
(Chiba Prefecture) Chiba	4	Kashiwa Reysol (2), JEF United Chiba (2)
(Hyōgo Prefecture) Hyōgo	3	Vissel Kobe (3)
(Aichi Prefecture) Aichi	1	Nagoya Grampus (1)

== Total titles won by region ==
This is a breakdown of titles won by region. Note that the Japan Football Association (JFA) divides Japan into nine football regions rather than the traditional eight geographical regions, with Chūbu split into Hokushin'etsu (combining Hokuriku and Shin'etsu) and Tōkai. See the Japanese Regional Leagues for further details.

=== Professional J.League era (1993–present) ===
Region	Number of titles	Clubs
Kantō	23	Kashima Antlers (9), Yokohama F. Marinos (5), Kawasaki Frontale (4), Tokyo Verdy (2), Urawa Red Diamonds (1), Kashiwa Reysol (1)
Kansai	4	Gamba Osaka (2), Vissel Kobe (2)
Tōkai	4	Júbilo Iwata (3), Nagoya Grampus (1)
Chūgoku	3	Sanfrecce Hiroshima (3)

=== All-time (1965–present) ===
Region	Number of titles	Clubs
Kantō	39	Kashima Antlers (9), Tokyo Verdy (7), Yokohama F. Marinos (7), Urawa Red Diamonds (5), Kawasaki Frontale (4), Shonan Bellmare (3), JEF United Chiba (2), Kashiwa Reysol (2)
Chūgoku	8	Sanfrecce Hiroshima (8)
Kansai	8	Cerezo Osaka (4), Gamba Osaka (2), Vissel Kobe (2)
Tōkai	5	Júbilo Iwata (4), Nagoya Grampus (1)

== See also ==
- J1 League
- Japan Soccer League
- Japanese Super Cup
- List of winners of J2 League and predecessors
- List of winners of J3 League and predecessors
- Football in Japan
- Japanese football league system
- L. League and WE League (women's title)

== Sources ==
- List at RSSSF
