= Koji Tanaka =

Japanese football player and manager (1955–2026)

Koji Tanaka 田中 孝司
Personal information
- Date of birth: November 2, 1955
- Place of birth: Saitama, Japan
- Date of death: May 26, 2026 (aged 70)
- Place of death: Yokohama, Japan
- Height: 1.70 m (5 ft 7 in)
- Position: Midfielder

Youth career
- 1971–1973: Saitama Urawa High School
- 1974–1977: Meiji University

Senior career*
Years	Team	Apps	(Gls)
1978–1988	NKK		

International career
1982–1984	Japan	20	(3)

Managerial career
- 1993–1995: Japan U-20
- 1997–1999: Nagoya Grampus Eight
- 2001–2002: Shonan Bellmare
- 2003–2006: Vegalta Sendai
- 2016–2020: Matsue City
Medal record
NKK
Runner-up	Japan Soccer League	1985/86
Runner-up	Japan Soccer League	1986/87
Runner-up	Japan Soccer League	1987/88
Winner	JSL Cup	1980
Winner	JSL Cup	1987
Winner	Emperor's Cup	1981
Runner-up	Emperor's Cup	1986
- * Club domestic league appearances and goals

Koji Tanaka (田中 孝司, Tanaka Kōji; November 2, 1955 – May 26, 2026) was a Japanese football player and manager. He played for the Japan national team.

== Club career ==
Tanaka was born in Saitama on November 2, 1955. After graduating from Meiji University, he joined Nippon Kokan (later NKK) in 1978. The club won the champions at 1980 JSL Cup and 1981 Emperor's Cup. From 1985, the club won the second place for three years in a row and won the champions 1987 JSL Cup. He retired in 1988.

== International career ==
On July 15, 1982, Tanaka debuted for the Japan national team against Romania. In November, he played at 1982 Asian Games. In 1983 and 1984, he played at 1984 Summer Olympics qualification. He played 20 games and scored 3 goals for Japan until 1984.

== Coaching career ==
After retirement, Tanaka started coaching career at NKK in 1989. In 1993, he became a manager for Japan U-20 national team. At 1995 World Youth Championship, he led U-20 Japan to advanced to the quarter-finals. In 1995, he signed with Nagoya Grampus Eight and became a coach. In November 1997, he became a manager as Carlos Queiroz successor. He was sacked in April 1999. In 2001, he signed with J2 League club Shonan Bellmare and managed the club until 2002.

In 2016 Tanaka was appointed manager of Matsue City FC, renamed FC Kagura Shimane.

== Death ==
Tanaka died from acute myeloid leukemia on May 26, 2026, at the age of 70.

== Playing statistics ==
=== Club ===
Appearances and goals by club, season and competition
Club	Season	League		
Club	Season	Division	Apps	Goals
NKK (Note: "Nippon Kokan" until 1988)	1978	Japan Soccer League Division 1	18	0
NKK	1979	Japan Soccer League Division 1	16	1
NKK	1980	Japan Soccer League Division 2		
NKK	1981	Japan Soccer League Division 2		
NKK	1982	Japan Soccer League Division 1	18	0
NKK	1983	Japan Soccer League Division 2		
NKK	1984	Japan Soccer League Division 1	18	0
NKK	1985–86	Japan Soccer League Division 1	15	0
NKK	1986–87	Japan Soccer League Division 1	22	0
NKK	1987–88	Japan Soccer League Division 1	22	0
NKK	1988–89	Japan Soccer League Division 1	14	0
Total			143	1

=== International ===
Appearances and goals by national team and year
National team	Year	Apps	Goals
Japan	1982	6	0
Japan	1983	8	3
Japan	1984	6	0
Total		20	3

== Managerial statistics ==
Team	From	To	Record				
Team	From	To	G	W	D	L	Win %
Nagoya Grampus Eight	1998	1999	40	25	1	14	62.50
Shonan Bellmare	2001	2002	88	36	20	32	40.91
Vegalta Sendai	2003	2006					
Matsue City	2016	2020					
Total			128	61	21	46	47.66
