= Kuniharu Nakamoto =

Japanese footballer (born 1959)

Kuniharu Nakamoto 中本 邦治
Personal information
- Full name: Kuniharu Nakamoto
- Date of birth: October 29, 1959 (age 67)
- Place of birth: Hiroshima, Japan
- Height: 1.74 m (5 ft 8 1/2 in)
- Position: Defender

Youth career
- 1975–1977: Hiroshima Technical High School
- 1978–1981: Chuo University

Senior career*
| Years | Team | Apps | (Gls) |
| 1982–1991 | NKK | | |

International career
| 1979 | Japan U-20 | 3 | (0) |
| 1987 | Japan | 5 | (0) |
Medal record
NKK
| Runner-up | Japan Soccer League | 1985/86 |
| Runner-up | Japan Soccer League | 1986/87 |
| Runner-up | Japan Soccer League | 1987/88 |
| Winner | JSL Cup | 1987 |
| Runner-up | Emperor's Cup | 1986 |
- * Club domestic league appearances and goals

Kuniharu Nakamoto (中本 邦治, Nakamoto Kuniharu; born October 29, 1959) is a former Japanese football player. He played for Japan national team.

== Club career ==
Nakamoto was born in Hiroshima Prefecture on October 29, 1959. After graduating from Chuo University, he joined Nippon Kokan (later NKK) in 1982. From 1985, the club won 2nd place for 3 years in a row. In 1987, the club won JSL Cup. He retired in 1991.

== National team career ==
In August 1979, when Nakamoto was a Chuo University student, he was selected Japan U-20 national team for 1979 World Youth Championship. He played 3 matches. In September 1987, he was selected Japan national team for 1988 Summer Olympics qualification. At this qualification, on September 2, he debuted against Thailand. He played 5 games for Japan in 1987.

== Club statistics ==
| Club performance | | | League | | Cup | | League Cup | | Total | |
| Season | Club | League | Apps | Goals | Apps | Goals | Apps | Goals | Apps | Goals |
| Japan | | | League | | Emperor's Cup | | JSL Cup | | Total | |
|---|---|---|---|---|---|---|---|---|---|---|
| 1982 | Nippon Kokan | JSL Division 1 | | | | | | | | |
| 1983 | Nippon Kokan | JSL Division 2 | | | | | | | | |
| 1984 | Nippon Kokan | JSL Division 1 | | | | | | | | |
| 1985/86 | Nippon Kokan | JSL Division 1 | | | | | | | | |
| 1986/87 | Nippon Kokan | JSL Division 1 | | | | | | | | |
| 1987/88 | Nippon Kokan | JSL Division 1 | | | | | | | | |
| 1988/89 | NKK | JSL Division 1 | | | | | | | | |
| 1989/90 | NKK | JSL Division 1 | 17 | 0 | | | 2 | 0 | 19 | 0 |
| 1990/91 | NKK | JSL Division 1 | 20 | 0 | | | 2 | 0 | 22 | 0 |
| Total | | | 37 | 0 | 0 | 0 | 4 | 0 | 41 | 0 |

== National team statistics ==
Japan national team
| Year | Apps | Goals |
|---|---|---|
| 1987 | 5 | 0 |
| Total | 5 | 0 |
