= Hisao Kuramata =

Japanese footballer and manager

Hisao Kuramata 倉又 寿雄
Personal information
- Full name: Hisao Kuramata
- Date of birth: December 1, 1958 (age 67)
- Place of birth: Saitama, Japan
- Height: 1.72 m (5 ft 7 1/2 in)
- Position: Defender

Youth career
- 1974–1976: Bunan High School
- 1977–1980: Nippon Sport Science University

Senior career*
Years	Team	Apps	(Gls)
1981–1992	NKK		

Managerial career
- 2006: FC Tokyo
Medal record
NKK
Runner-up	Japan Soccer League	1985/86
Runner-up	Japan Soccer League	1986/87
Runner-up	Japan Soccer League	1987/88
Winner	JSL Cup	1987
Winner	Emperor's Cup	1981
Runner-up	Emperor's Cup	1986
- * Club domestic league appearances and goals

Hisao Kuramata (倉又 寿雄, Kuramata Hisao; born December 1, 1958) is a former Japanese football player and manager.

== Playing career ==
Kuramata was born in Saitama Prefecture on December 1, 1958. After graduating from Nippon Sport Science University, he joined Nippon Kokan (later NKK) in 1981. He played until 1992.

== Coaching career ==
After retirement, Kuramata became an assistant coach for NKK in 1993. Because the club was disbanded end of season, he moved to Tokyo Gas (later FC Tokyo). He coached the top team as assistant coach and youth team as manager until 2012. He also managed the top team in 2006 as Alexandre Gallo successor.

== Managerial statistics ==
Team	From	To	Record				
Team	From	To	G	W	D	L	Win %
FC Tokyo	2006	2006	17	7	1	9	41.18
Total			17	7	1	9	41.18
