= Kiyotaka Matsui =

Japanese footballer (born 1961)

Kiyotaka Matsui 松井 清隆
Personal information
- Full name: Kiyotaka Matsui
- Date of birth: January 4, 1961 (age 65)
- Place of birth: Takatsuki, Osaka, Japan
- Height: 1.80 m (5 ft 11 in)
- Position: Goalkeeper

Youth career
- 1976–1978: Kyoto Nishi High School
- 1979–1982: Osaka University of Health and Sport Sciences

Senior career*
Years	Team	Apps	(Gls)
1983–1992	NKK	170	(0)
1992–1993	Shimizu S-Pulse	0	(0)
Total		170	(0)

International career
1984–1988	Japan	15	(0)
Medal record
NKK
Runner-up	Japan Soccer League	1985/86
Runner-up	Japan Soccer League	1986/87
Runner-up	Japan Soccer League	1987/88
Winner	JSL Cup	1987
Runner-up	Emperor's Cup	1986
Shimizu S-Pulse
Runner-up	J.League Cup	1992
Runner-up	J.League Cup	1993
- * Club domestic league appearances and goals

Kiyotaka Matsui (松井 清隆, Matsui Kiyotaka; born January 4, 1961) is a former Japanese football player. He played for Japan national team.

== Club career ==
Matsui was born in Takatsuki on January 4, 1961. After graduating from Osaka University of Health and Sport Sciences, he joined Nippon Kokan (later NKK) in 1983. From 1985, the club won the 2nd place for 3 years in a row and won the champions 1987 JSL Cup. In 1992, he moved to Shimizu S-Pulse joined new league J.League. He retired in 1993.

== National team career ==
On May 31, 1984, Matsui debuted for Japan national team against China. In 1985, he played as regular goalkeeper at 1986 World Cup qualification. He also played at 1986 Asian Games and 1988 Summer Olympics qualification. He played 15 games for Japan until 1988.

== Club statistics ==
Club performance			League		Cup		League Cup		Total	
Season	Club	League	Apps	Goals	Apps	Goals	Apps	Goals	Apps	Goals
Japan			League		Emperor's Cup		J.League Cup		Total	
1983	Nippon Kokan	JSL Division 2	12	0					12	0
1984	Nippon Kokan	JSL Division 1	18	0					18	0
1985/86	Nippon Kokan	JSL Division 1	20	0					20	0
1986/87	Nippon Kokan	JSL Division 1	22	0					22	0
1987/88	Nippon Kokan	JSL Division 1	22	0			5	0	27	0
1988/89	NKK	JSL Division 1	16	0			0	0	16	0
1989/90	NKK	JSL Division 1	22	0			2	0	24	0
1990/91	NKK	JSL Division 1	15	0			2	0	17	0
1991/92	NKK	JSL Division 2	23	0			0	0	23	0
1992	Shimizu S-Pulse	J1 League	-		0	0	0	0	0	0
1993	Shimizu S-Pulse	J1 League	0	0	0	0	0	0	0	0
Total			170	0	0	0	9	0	179	0

== National team statistics ==
Japan national team
Year	Apps	Goals
1984	2	0
1985	8	0
1986	2	0
1987	1	0
1988	2	0
Total	15	0
