= Tomoyasu Asaoka =

Japanese footballer (1962–2021)

Tomoyasu Asaoka 浅岡 朝泰
Personal information
- Full name: Tomoyasu Asaoka
- Date of birth: 6 April 1962
- Place of birth: Tokyo, Japan
- Date of death: 6 October 2021 (aged 59)
- Height: 1.76 m (5 ft 9 in)
- Position: Midfielder

Youth career
- 1978–1980: Soka High School

College career
Years	Team	Apps	(Gls)
1981–1984	University of Tsukuba		

Senior career*
Years	Team	Apps	(Gls)
1985–1988	Nippon Kokan	63	(6)
1988–1991	Yomiuri	40	(2)
Total		103	(8)

International career
1987–1989	Japan	8	(0)
Medal record
Nippon Kokan
Runner-up	Japan Soccer League	1985/86
Runner-up	Japan Soccer League	1986/87
Runner-up	Japan Soccer League	1987/88
Winner	JSL Cup	1987
Runner-up	Emperor's Cup	1986
Yomiuri
Winner	Japan Soccer League	1990/91
Runner-up	Japan Soccer League	1989/90
- * Club domestic league appearances and goals

Tomoyasu Asaoka (浅岡 朝泰, Asaoka Tomoyasu; 6 April 1962 – 6 October 2021) was a Japanese professional footballer who played as a midfielder for Nippon Kokan, Yomiuri and the Japan national team.

== Club career ==
Asaoka was born in Tokyo on 6 April 1962. After graduating from the University of Tsukuba, he joined Nippon Kokan in 1985. Starting in 1985, the club won second place for three years in a row. He was also selected Best Eleven 1985–86. He moved to Yomiuri in 1988. The club won the league championship in 1990–91. He retired in 1991.

== International career ==
In April 1987, Asaoka was selected in Japan national team for 1988 Summer Olympics qualification. At this qualification, on 12 April, he debuted against Singapore. He played 8 games for Japan until 1989.

== Death ==
Asaoka died on 6 October 2021, aged 59.

== Career statistics ==
=== Club ===
Appearances and goals by club, season and competition
Club	Season	League			Emperor's Cup		JSL Cup		Total	
Club	Season	Division	Apps	Goals	Apps	Goals	Apps	Goals	Apps	Goals
Nippon Kokan	1985–86	JSL Division 1	21	2					21	2
Nippon Kokan	1986–87	JSL Division 1	21	2					21	2
Nippon Kokan	1987–88	JSL Division 1	21	2					21	2
Nippon Kokan	Total		63	6					63	6
Yomiuri	1988–89	JSL Division 1	17	2	3	1	3	0	23	3
Yomiuri	1989–90	JSL Division 1	22	0	4	0	3	0	29	0
Yomiuri	1990–91	JSL Division 1	1	0	1	0	0	0	2	0
Yomiuri	Total		40	2	8	1	6	0	54	3
Career total			103	8	8	1	6	0	117	9

=== International ===
Appearances and goals by national team and year
National team	Year	Apps	Goals
Japan	1987	1	0
Japan	1988	5	0
Japan	1989	2	0
Total		8	0
