= Nobuyo Fujishiro =

Japanese footballer

Nobuyo Fujishiro 藤代 伸世
Personal information
- Full name: Nobuyo Fujishiro
- Date of birth: January 25, 1960 (age 66)
- Place of birth: Chiba, Japan
- Height: 1.79 m (5 ft 10 1/2 in)
- Position: Midfielder

Youth career
- 1975–1977: Chiba Keizai High School

College career
Years	Team	Apps	(Gls)
1978–1981	Juntendo University		

Senior career*
Years	Team	Apps	(Gls)
1982–1991	NKK		
1992	Sumitomo Metal	16	(5)

International career
1988	Japan	2	(0)
Medal record
NKK
Runner-up	Japan Soccer League	1985/86
Runner-up	Japan Soccer League	1986/87
Runner-up	Japan Soccer League	1987/88
Winner	JSL Cup	1987
Runner-up	Emperor's Cup	1986
- * Club domestic league appearances and goals

Nobuyo Fujishiro (藤代 伸世, Fujishiro Nobuyo; born January 25, 1960) is a former Japanese football player. He played for the Japan national team.

== Club career ==
Fujishiro was born in Chiba Prefecture on January 25, 1960. After graduating from Juntendo University, he joined Nippon Kokan (later NKK SC) in 1982. Starting in 1985, the club won second place for three years in a row. The club also won the 1987 JSL Cup. He left the club in 1991 and joined Sumitomo Metal in 1992. He retired in 1992.

== National team career ==
On January 27, 1988, Fujishiro debuted for the Japan national team against the United Arab Emirates. He played two games for Japan in 1988.

== Club statistics ==
Club performance			League		Cup		League Cup		Total	
Season	Club	League	Apps	Goals	Apps	Goals	Apps	Goals	Apps	Goals
Japan			League		Emperor's Cup		JSL Cup		Total	
1982	Nippon Kokan	JSL Division 1								
1983	Nippon Kokan	JSL Division 2								
1984	Nippon Kokan	JSL Division 1								
1985/86	Nippon Kokan	JSL Division 1								
1986/87	Nippon Kokan	JSL Division 1								
1987/88	Nippon Kokan	JSL Division 1								
1988/89	NKK	JSL Division 1								
1989/90	NKK	JSL Division 1	20	2			2	0	22	2
1990/91	NKK	JSL Division 1	20	4			2	1	22	5
1991/92	Sumitomo Metal	JSL Division 2	16	5			0	0	16	5
Total			56	11	0	0	4	1	60	11

== National team statistics ==
Japan national team
Year	Apps	Goals
1988	2	0
Total	2	0
