= Takayoshi Yamano =

Japanese footballer

Takayoshi Yamano 山野 孝義
Personal information
- Full name: Takayoshi Yamano
- Date of birth: April 5, 1955 (age 71)
- Place of birth: Osaka, Japan
- Height: 1.75 m (5 ft 9 in)
- Position: Defender

Youth career
- 1971–1973: Hokuyo High School
- 1974–1977: Osaka University of Commerce

Senior career*
Years	Team	Apps	(Gls)
1978–1984	Yanmar Diesel	125	(4)
1985–1991	Osaka Gas		
Total		125	(4)

International career
1980	Japan	2	(0)
Medal record
Yanmar Diesel
Winner	Japan Soccer League	1980
Runner-up	Japan Soccer League	1978
Winner	JSL Cup	1983
Winner	JSL Cup	1984
Runner-up	JSL Cup	1982
Runner-up	Emperor's Cup	1983
- * Club domestic league appearances and goals

Takayoshi Yamano (山野 孝義, Yamano Takayoshi; born April 5, 1955) is a former Japanese football player. He played for Japan national team.

== Club career ==
Yamano was born in Osaka Prefecture on April 5, 1955. After graduating from Osaka University of Commerce, he joined his local club Yanmar Diesel in 1978. The club won the league champions in 1980. The club also won 1983 and 1984 JSL Cup. In 1985, he moved to Osaka Gas. He retired in 1991.

== National team career ==
On June 11, 1980, Yamano debuted for Japan national team against China. He played 2 games for Japan in 1980.

== Club statistics ==
Club performance			League	
Season	Club	League	Apps	Goals
Japan			League	
1978	Yanmar Diesel	JSL Division 1		
1979	Yanmar Diesel	JSL Division 1		
1980	Yanmar Diesel	JSL Division 1		
1981	Yanmar Diesel	JSL Division 1		
1982	Yanmar Diesel	JSL Division 1		
1983	Yanmar Diesel	JSL Division 1		
1984	Yanmar Diesel	JSL Division 1		
1985/86	Osaka Gas	JSL Division 2		
1986/87	Osaka Gas	JSL Division 2		
1987/88	Osaka Gas	JSL Division 2		
1988/89	Osaka Gas	JSL Division 2		
1989/90	Osaka Gas	JSL Division 2	27	0
1990/91	Osaka Gas	JSL Division 2	23	0
Total			50	0

== National team statistics ==
Japan national team
Year	Apps	Goals
1980	2	0
Total	2	0
