= Toshio Matsuura =

Japanese footballer and manager

Satoshio Matsuura 松浦 敏夫
Personal information
- Full name: Satoshio Matsuura
- Date of birth: November 20, 1955 (age 70)
- Place of birth: Yokohama, Japan
- Height: 1.90 m (6 ft 3 in)
- Position: Forward

Youth career
- 1971–1973: Yokohama Midorigaoka High School
- 1974–1977: Waseda University

Senior career*
Years	Team	Apps	(Gls)
1978–1991	NKK		

International career
1981–1987	Japan	22	(6)

Managerial career
- 1992–1993: NKK
Medal record
NKK
Runner-up	Japan Soccer League	1985/86
Runner-up	Japan Soccer League	1986/87
Runner-up	Japan Soccer League	1987/88
Winner	JSL Cup	1980
Winner	JSL Cup	1987
Winner	Emperor's Cup	1981
Runner-up	Emperor's Cup	1986
- * Club domestic league appearances and goals

Satoshio Matsuura (松浦 敏夫, Matsuura Satoshio; born November 20, 1955) is a former Japanese football player and manager. He played for Japan national team.

== Club career ==
Matsuura was born in Yokohama on November 20, 1955. After graduating from Waseda University, he joined Nippon Kokan (later NKK) in 1978. The club won the champions at 1980 JSL Cup and 1981 Emperor's Cup. From 1985, the club won the 2nd place for 3 years in a row and won the champions 1987 JSL Cup. He also became a top scorer in 1986–87 and 1987–88. He retired in 1991.

== National team career ==
On June 2, 1981, Matsuura debuted for Japan national team against China. He played at 1984 Summer Olympics qualification. In 1986, he was selected Japan for the first time in 2 years and also played 1986 Asian Games. In 1987, he played at 1984 Summer Olympics qualification. This qualification was his last game for Japan. He played 22 games and scored 6 goals for Japan until 1987.

== Coaching career ==
After retirement, Matsuura became a manager NKK in 1992. However the club was disbanded end of 1993 season and he resigned.

== Club statistics ==
Club performance			League		Cup		League Cup		Total	
Season	Club	League	Apps	Goals	Apps	Goals	Apps	Goals	Apps	Goals
Japan			League		Emperor's Cup		JSL Cup		Total	
1978	Nippon Kokan	JSL Division 1	18	3					18	3
1979	Nippon Kokan	JSL Division 1	18	6					18	6
1980	Nippon Kokan	JSL Division 2								
1981	Nippon Kokan	JSL Division 2								
1982	Nippon Kokan	JSL Division 1	18	2					18	2
1983	Nippon Kokan	JSL Division 2								
1984	Nippon Kokan	JSL Division 1	18	8					18	8
1985/86	Nippon Kokan	JSL Division 1	21	10					21	10
1986/87	Nippon Kokan	JSL Division 1	22	14					22	14
1987/88	Nippon Kokan	JSL Division 1	21	11					21	11
1988/89	NKK	JSL Division 1	22	4					22	4
1989/90	NKK	JSL Division 1	19	8			1	0	20	8
1990/91	NKK	JSL Division 1	16	2			0	0	16	2
Total			193	68	0	0	1	0	194	68

== National team statistics ==
Japan national team
Year	Apps	Goals
1981	4	1
1982	2	0
1983	5	0
1984	1	0
1985	0	0
1986	3	1
1987	7	4
Total	22	6

== Personal honors ==
- Japan Soccer League First Division Top Scorer - 1986/87, 1987/88
