= Satoru Mochizuki =

Japanese footballer

Satoru Mochizuki 望月 聡
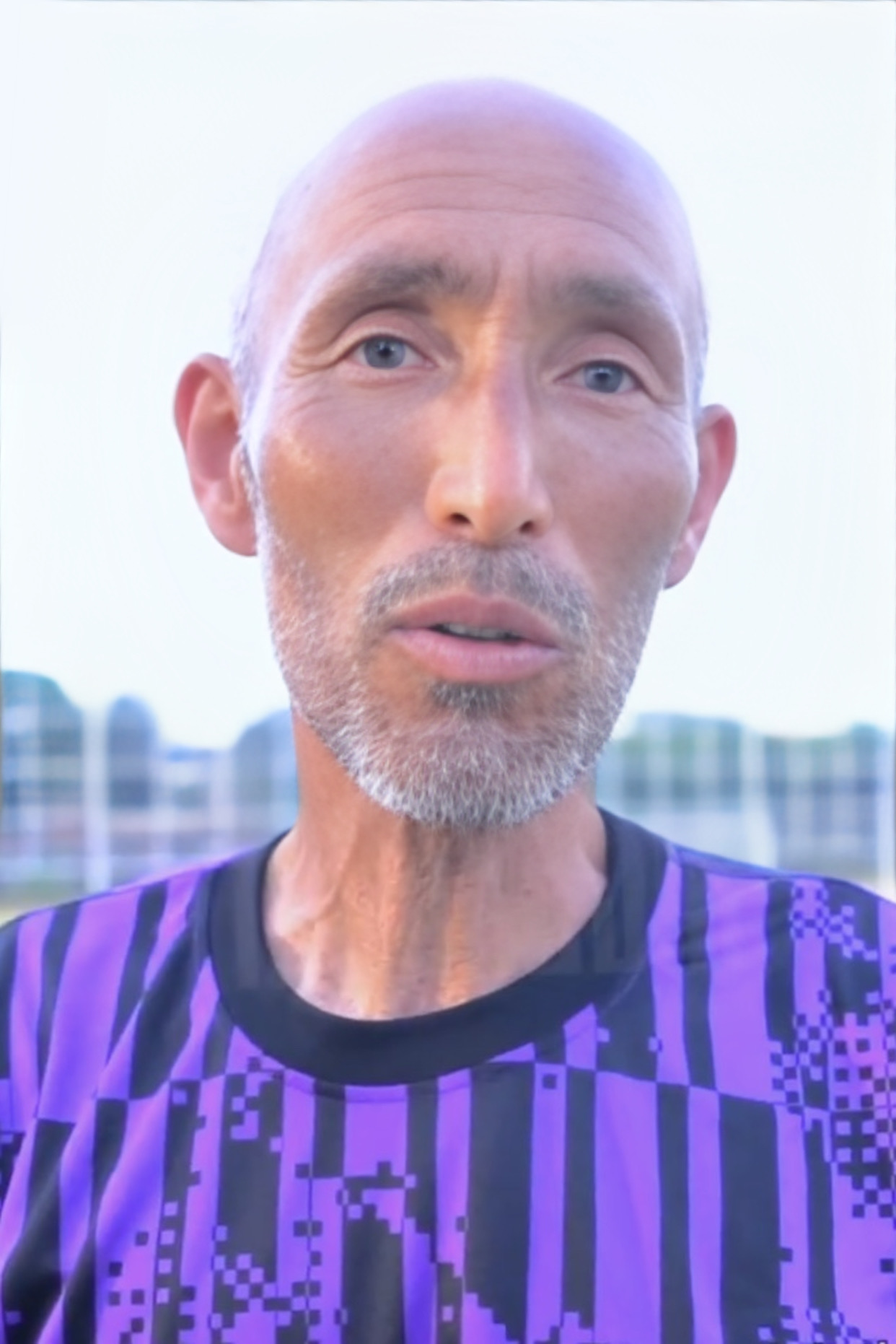
- Mochizuki with Indonesia in 2024

Personal information
- Full name: Satoru Mochizuki
- Date of birth: 18 May 1964 (age 62)
- Place of birth: Otsu, Shiga, Japan
- Height: 1.83 m (6 ft 0 in)
- Positions: Midfielder; forward

Team information
- Current team: Indonesia Women (head coach)

Youth career
- 1980–1982: Moriyama High School
- 1983–1986: Osaka University of Commerce

Senior career*
Years	Team	Apps	(Gls)
1987–1992	NKK	98	(30)
1992–1995	Urawa Reds	37	(4)
1995–1996	Kyoto Purple Sanga	27	(1)
Total		162	(35)

International career
1988–1989	Japan	7	(0)

Managerial career
- 1998: Kyoto Purple Sanga
- 2000–2001: Vissel Kobe
- 2005: Japan U17
- 2006–2007: Urawa Red Diamonds (youth)
- 2008–2009: Biwako Seikei Sport College
- 2008–2012: Japan Women (assistant)
- 2015–2019: Japan Women's Universiade
- 2024–2025: Indonesia Women
- 2026: Indonesia Women
Medal record
Representing Indonesia (as manager)
AFF Women's Cup
Winner	2024 Laos
Winner	2026 Malaysia
FIFA Series
Third place	2026 Thailand
- * Club domestic league appearances and goals

Satoru Mochizuki (望月 聡, Mochizuki Satoru; born 18 May 1964) is a Japanese football manager and former player who is currently in charge for the Indonesia women's national team. In his career as a player, he has played for the Japan national team.

== Club career ==
Mochizuki was born in Otsu on 18 May 1964. After graduating from Osaka University of Commerce, he joined Nippon Kokan (later NKK SC) in 1987. The club won the 2nd place at 1987–88 Japan Soccer League and the champions at 1987 JSL Cup. In 1992, he moved to J1 League club Urawa Reds. In 1995, he moved to Japan Football League club Kyoto Purple Sanga. In 1995, the club won the 2nd place and was promoted to J1 League. He retired in 1996.

== International career ==
On 27 January 1988, Mochizuki debuted for Japan national team against United Arab Emirates. He also played at 1990 World Cup qualification in 1989. He played 7 games for Japan until 1989.

== Managerial career ==
Mochizuki served as the assistant manager for the Japan women's national football team from 2008 to 2012, where he helped the team won the 2011 FIFA Women's World Cup.

On 20 February 2024, Mochizuki was appointed as the new Indonesia women's national football team coach. Mochizuki also lead the women’s U17 team at the 2024 AFC U-17 Women's Asian Cup tournament in Bali.

On 28 May 2024, the women's senior first match under Mochizuki tutelage, ends in a huge victory against Singapore in 5–1 win on a friendly match.

Under Mochizuki, the team participated in the annual 2024 AFF Women's Cup, which also served as the qualification for the upcoming ASEAN Women's Championship, Indonesia managed to win their first maiden trophy in history, by defeating Cambodia 3–1 in the final.

== Career statistics ==
=== Club ===
Club performance			League		Cup		League Cup		Total	
Season	Club	League	Apps	Goals	Apps	Goals	Apps	Goals	Apps	Goals
Japan			League		Emperor's Cup		J.League Cup		Total	
1987/88	Nippon Kokan	JSL Division 1	21	5	2	1	5	1	28	7
1988/89	NKK	JSL Division 1	22	3	1	0	1	0	24	3
1989/90	NKK	JSL Division 1	14	2	1	0	2	3	17	5
1990/91	NKK	JSL Division 1	13	4	2	1	2	1	17	6
1991/92	NKK	JSL Division 2	28	16	0	0	2	0	30	16
1992	Urawa Reds	J1 League	-		4	1	9	1	13	2
1993	Urawa Reds	J1 League	31	3	2	0	5	1	38	4
1994	Urawa Reds	J1 League	6	1	2	0	0	0	8	1
1995	Urawa Reds	J1 League	0	0	0	0	-		0	0
1995	Kyoto Purple Sanga	Football League	21	1	1	0	-		22	1
1996	Kyoto Purple Sanga	J1 League	6	0	0	0	3	0	9	0
Total			162	35	15	3	29	7	206	45

=== International ===
Appearances and goals by national team and year
National team	Year	Apps	Goals
Japan	1988	3	0
Japan	1989	4	0
Total		7	0

== Honours ==
=== Player ===
NKK

- JSL Cup: 1987

=== Manager ===
Indonesia Women

- AFF Women's Cup: 2024, 2026
- FIFA Series Third-place: 2026
