= Satoshi Miyauchi =

Japanese footballer and manager

Satoshi Miyauchi 宮内 聡
Personal information
- Full name: Satoshi Miyauchi
- Date of birth: November 26, 1959 (age 66)
- Place of birth: Tokyo, Japan
- Height: 1.75 m (5 ft 9 in)
- Position: Midfielder

Youth career
- 1975–1977: Teikyo High School

Senior career*
Years	Team	Apps	(Gls)
1978–1988	Furukawa Electric	114	(6)
Total		114	(6)

International career
1984–1987	Japan	20	(0)

Managerial career
- 1989–1997: Prima Ham FC Kunoichi
- 1997–1999: Japan Women
Medal record
Furukawa Electric
Winner	Japan Soccer League	1985/86
Winner	JSL Cup	1982
Winner	JSL Cup	1986
Runner-up	JSL Cup	1979
Runner-up	Emperor's Cup	1984
- * Club domestic league appearances and goals

Satoshi Miyauchi (宮内 聡, Miyauchi Satoshi; born November 26, 1959) is a former Japanese football player and manager. He played for Japan national team. He also managed Japan women's national team.

== Club career ==
Miyauchi was born in Tokyo on November 26, 1959. After graduating from high school, he joined Furukawa Electric in 1978. Initially, he could not play in many games for injury. In 1982, the club won JSL Cup. From 1983, he played as regular player and the club won 1985–86 Japan Soccer League and 1986 JSL Cup. He was also selected Best Eleven in 1985–86 and 1986–87. In Asia, the club won 1986 Asian Club Championship. This is first Asian champions as Japanese club. He retired in 1988. He played 114 games and scored 6 goals in the league.

== National team career ==
In August 1979, Miyauchi was selected Japan U-20 national team for 1979 World Youth Championship. But he did not play in the match. On September 30, 1984, he debuted for Japan national team against South Korea. He played at 1986 World Cup qualification, 1986 Asian Games and 1988 Summer Olympics qualification. He played 20 games for Japan until 1987.

== Coaching career ==
After retirement, in 1989, Miyauchi became a manager for L.League club Prima Ham FC Kunoichi. The club won 1994 Empress's Cup, 1995 L.League and 1997 L.League Cup. He resigned in 1997. In 1997, he also became a manager for Japan women's national team. He managed at 1997 AFC Women's Championship and 1998 Asian Games. Japan won the 3rd place at both tournament. In 1999, he managed at 1999 World Cup. However Japan was defeated in group stage and failure to qualify for 2000 Summer Olympics. He resigned after 1999 World Cup.

== Club statistics ==
Club performance			League	
Season	Club	League	Apps	Goals
Japan			League	
1978	Furukawa Electric	JSL Division 1	1	0
1979	Furukawa Electric	JSL Division 1	10	1
1980	Furukawa Electric	JSL Division 1	3	1
1981	Furukawa Electric	JSL Division 1	3	0
1982	Furukawa Electric	JSL Division 1	4	1
1983	Furukawa Electric	JSL Division 1	16	2
1984	Furukawa Electric	JSL Division 1	18	1
1985/86	Furukawa Electric	JSL Division 1	21	0
1986/87	Furukawa Electric	JSL Division 1	18	0
1987/88	Furukawa Electric	JSL Division 1	20	0
Total			114	6

== National team statistics ==
Japan national team
Year	Apps	Goals
1984	1	0
1985	8	0
1986	6	0
1987	5	0
Total	20	0
