= Shunzo Ono =

Japanese footballer

Shunzo Ono 大野 俊三
Personal information
- Full name: Shunzo Ono
- Date of birth: March 29, 1965 (age 61)
- Place of birth: Funabashi, Chiba, Japan
- Height: 1.77 m (5 ft 9 1/2 in)
- Position: Defender

Youth career
- 1980–1982: Narashino High School

Senior career*
Years	Team	Apps	(Gls)
1983–1995	Kashima Antlers		
1996	Kyoto Purple Sanga	10	(0)
Medal record
Kashima Antlers
Runner-up	J1 League	1993
Runner-up	JSL Cup	1987
Runner-up	Emperor's Cup	1993
- * Club domestic league appearances and goals

Shunzo Ono (大野 俊三, Ōno Shunzō; born March 29, 1965) is a former Japanese footballer who played as a defender.

== Playing career ==
Ono was born in Funabashi on March 29, 1965. After graduating from Narashino High School, he joined Japan Soccer League side Sumitomo Metal (later Kashima Antlers) in 1983. He played as center back and the club won the 2nd place in 1987 JSL Cup. In 1992, Japan Soccer League was folded and founded new league J1 League. In first season in 1993, the club won the 2nd place J1 League and he was selected Best Eleven. The club also won the 2nd place 1993 Emperor's Cup. However his opportunity to play decreased in 1995 and he moved to Kyoto Purple Sanga in 1996. He retired end of 1996 season.

== After retirement ==
After his playing career, Ono became the owner of an izakaya (Japanese pub). He now works as a soccer commentator and personality on a local radio station, and Director of the Kashima Heights Sports Plaza.

== Club statistics ==
Club performance			League		Cup		League Cup		Total	
Season	Club	League	Apps	Goals	Apps	Goals	Apps	Goals	Apps	Goals
Japan			League		Emperor's Cup		J.League Cup		Total	
1983	Sumitomo Metal	JSL Division 2								
1984	Sumitomo Metal	JSL Division 2								
1985/86	Sumitomo Metal	JSL Division 1								
1986/87	Sumitomo Metal	JSL Division 2								
1987/88	Sumitomo Metal	JSL Division 1								
1988/89	Sumitomo Metal	JSL Division 1								
1989/90	Sumitomo Metal	JSL Division 2	30	6			1	0	31	6
1990/91	Sumitomo Metal	JSL Division 2	25	0			2	0	27	0
1991/92	Sumitomo Metal	JSL Division 2	26	2			2	0	28	2
1992	Kashima Antlers	J1 League	-		1	0	6	0	7	0
1993	Kashima Antlers	J1 League	35	1	5	0	0	0	40	1
1994	Kashima Antlers	J1 League	29	0	0	0	1	0	30	0
1995	Kashima Antlers	J1 League	25	0	0	0	-		25	0
1996	Kyoto Purple Sanga	J1 League	10	0	2	0	4	0	16	0
Total			180	9	8	0	16	0	204	9

== Personal honors ==
- J.League Best XI - 1993

== Team honors ==
Sumitomo Metal/Kashima Antlers

- Japan Soccer League Division 2 - 1984, 1986/87
