= Satoshi Tezuka =

Japanese footballer and manager

Satoshi Tezuka 手塚 聡
Personal information
- Full name: Satoshi Tezuka
- Date of birth: September 4, 1958 (age 68)
- Place of birth: Tochigi, Japan
- Height: 1.72 m (5 ft 7 1/2 in)
- Position: Forward

Youth career
- 1974–1976: Imaichi High School

College career
Years	Team	Apps	(Gls)
1977–1980	Chuo University		

Senior career*
Years	Team	Apps	(Gls)
1981–1991	Fujita Industries	167	(42)
Total		167	(42)

International career
1980–1988	Japan	25	(2)

Managerial career
- 2005: Thespa Kusatsu
- 2007–2009: Fagiano Okayama
- 2010–2011: Fukushima United FC
Medal record
Fujita Industries
Winner	Japan Soccer League	1981
Runner-up	Emperor's Cup	1982
Runner-up	Emperor's Cup	1985
Runner-up	Emperor's Cup	1988
- * Club domestic league appearances and goals

Satoshi Tezuka (手塚 聡, Tezuka Satoshi; born September 4, 1958) is a former Japanese football player and manager. He played for Japan national team.

== Club career ==
Tezuka was born in Tochigi Prefecture on September 4, 1958. After graduating from Chuo University, he joined Fujita Industries in 1981. The club won the league champions in 1981. He retired in 1991. He played 167 games and scored 42 goals in the league.

== National team career ==
On June 11, 1980, when Tezuka was a Chuo University student, he debuted for Japan national team against China. He played at 1986 World Cup qualification, 1986 Asian Games and 1988 Summer Olympics qualification. He played 25 games and scored 2 goals for Japan until 1988.

== Coaching career ==
After retirement, Tezuka started coaching career at Fujita Industries (later Bellmare Hiratsuka, Shonan Bellmare) in 1991. He moved to Mito HollyHock in 2003. In 2005, he moved to Thespa Kusatsu and became a manager. In 2007, he signed with Japanese Regional Leagues club Fagiano Okayama. He promoted the club to Japan Football League in 2008 and J2 League in 2009. In 2010, he moved to Fukushima United FC and managed until 2011.

== Club statistics ==
Club performance			League		Cup		League Cup		Total	
Season	Club	League	Apps	Goals	Apps	Goals	Apps	Goals	Apps	Goals
Japan			League		Emperor's Cup		JSL Cup		Total	
1981	Fujita Industries	JSL Division 1								
1982	Fujita Industries	JSL Division 1								
1983	Fujita Industries	JSL Division 1								
1984	Fujita Industries	JSL Division 1								
1985/86	Fujita Industries	JSL Division 1								
1986/87	Fujita Industries	JSL Division 1								
1987/88	Fujita Industries	JSL Division 1								
1988/89	Fujita Industries	JSL Division 1								
1989/90	Fujita Industries	JSL Division 1	20	5			3	2	23	7
1990/91	Fujita Industries	JSL Division 2	21	4			1	0	22	4
Total			41	9	0	0	4	2	45	11

== National team statistics ==
Japan national team
Year	Apps	Goals
1980	2	0
1981	6	0
1982	0	0
1983	0	0
1984	0	0
1985	2	0
1986	4	0
1987	8	2
1988	3	0
Total	25	2

== Managerial statistics ==
Team	From	To	Record				
Team	From	To	G	W	D	L	Win %
Thespa Kusatsu	2005	2005	44	5	8	31	11.36
Fagiano Okayama	2009	2009	51	8	12	31	15.69
Total			95	13	20	62	13.68
