= Hisashi Kaneko =

Japanese footballer (born 1959)

Hisashi Kaneko 金子 久
Personal information
- Full name: Hisashi Kaneko
- Date of birth: September 12, 1959 (age 67)
- Place of birth: Saitama, Saitama, Japan
- Height: 1.79 m (5 ft 10 1/2 in)
- Position: Defender

Youth career
- 1975–1977: Teikyo High School

Senior career*
Years	Team	Apps	(Gls)
1978–1992	Furukawa Electric	163	(23)
Total		163	(23)

International career
1979	Japan U-20	1	(0)
1986–1987	Japan	7	(1)
Medal record
Furukawa Electric
Winner	Japan Soccer League	1985/86
Winner	JSL Cup	1982
Winner	JSL Cup	1986
Runner-up	JSL Cup	1979
Runner-up	JSL Cup	1990
Runner-up	Emperor's Cup	1984
- * Club domestic league appearances and goals

Hisashi Kaneko (金子 久, Kaneko Hisashi; born September 12, 1959) is a former Japanese football player. He played for Japan national team.

== Club career ==
Kaneko was born in Saitama on September 12, 1959. After graduating from high school, he joined Furukawa Electric in 1978. Initially, he did play in many games. The club won the 1982 JSL Cup. In 1985, he played as a regular player and the club won the 1985–86 Japan Soccer League and 1986 JSL Cup. He was also selected for the Best Eleven in 1985–86 and in 1986–87. The club won the 1986 Asian Club Championship, which was the first time the Asian championships was won by a Japanese club. He retired in 1992.

== National team career ==
In August 1979, Kaneko was selected Japan U-20 national team for 1979 World Youth Championship. On July 25, 1986, he debuted for Japan national team against Syria. He also played at 1986 Asian Games. In 1987, he was selected Japan for 1988 Summer Olympics qualification. He played 7 games and scored 1 goal for Japan until 1987.

== Club statistics ==
Club performance			League		Cup		League Cup		Total	
Season	Club	League	Apps	Goals	Apps	Goals	Apps	Goals	Apps	Goals
Japan			League		Emperor's Cup		JSL Cup		Total	
1978	Furukawa Electric	JSL Division 1	0	0					0	0
1979	Furukawa Electric	JSL Division 1	1	0					1	0
1980	Furukawa Electric	JSL Division 1	2	0					2	0
1981	Furukawa Electric	JSL Division 1	13	0					13	0
1982	Furukawa Electric	JSL Division 1	12	1					12	1
1983	Furukawa Electric	JSL Division 1	10	1					10	1
1984	Furukawa Electric	JSL Division 1	10	1					10	1
1985/86	Furukawa Electric	JSL Division 1	22	2					22	2
1986/87	Furukawa Electric	JSL Division 1	22	5					22	5
1987/88	Furukawa Electric	JSL Division 1	20	4					20	4
1988/89	Furukawa Electric	JSL Division 1	22	3					22	3
1989/90	Furukawa Electric	JSL Division 1	21	5			2	0	23	5
1990/91	Furukawa Electric	JSL Division 1	5	1			5	2	10	3
1991/92	Furukawa Electric	JSL Division 1	3	0			0	0	3	0
Total			163	23	0	0	7	2	170	25

== National team statistics ==
Japan national team
Year	Apps	Goals
1986	3	0
1987	4	1
Total	7	1
