= Shiro Kikuhara =

Japanese footballer

Shiro Kikuhara 菊原 志郎
Personal information
- Full name: Shiro Kikuhara
- Date of birth: July 7, 1969 (age 57)
- Place of birth: Kanagawa, Japan
- Height: 1.67 m (5 ft 5 1/2 in)
- Position: Midfielder

Youth career
- Yomiuri

Senior career*
| Years | Team | Apps | (Gls) |
| 1985–1996 | Verdy Kawasaki | 95 | (13) |
| 1994–1995 | → Urawa Reds (loan) | 9 | (0) |
| Total | | 104 | (13) |

International career
| 1990 | Japan | 5 | (0) |
Medal record
Verdy Kawasaki
| Winner | Japan Soccer League | 1986/87 |
| Winner | Japan Soccer League | 1990/91 |
| Winner | Japan Soccer League | 1991/92 |
| Runner-up | Japan Soccer League | 1989/90 |
| Winner | J1 League | 1993 |
| Winner | JSL Cup | 1985 |
| Winner | JSL Cup | 1991 |
| Winner | J.League Cup | 1992 |
| Winner | J.League Cup | 1993 |
| Runner-up | J.League Cup | 1996 |
| Winner | Emperor's Cup | 1986 |
| Winner | Emperor's Cup | 1987 |
| Winner | Emperor's Cup | 1996 |
| Runner-up | Emperor's Cup | 1991 |
| Runner-up | Emperor's Cup | 1992 |
- * Club domestic league appearances and goals

Shiro Kikuhara (菊原 志郎, Kikuhara Shirō; born July 7, 1969) is a former Japanese football player. He played for Japan national team.

== Club career ==
Kikuhara was born in Kanagawa Prefecture on July 7, 1969. He joined the Yomiuri (later Verdy Kawasaki) youth team in 1985. In February 1986, he debuted in the Japan Soccer League when he was 16 years old. The club won the league championship three times, the JSL Cup twice, and the Emperor's Cup twice. In Asia, the club also won the 1987 Asian Club Championship. In 1992, the Japan Soccer League was dissolved and the new league J1 League was formed. The club won the 1993 J.League and the 1992 and 1993 J.League Cups. However, he gradually played less often. So he moved to the Urawa Reds in 1994. He returned to Verdy Kawasaki in 1996 and retired at the end of the season.

== National team career ==
On July 29, 1990, Kikuhara debuted for Japan national team against China. He also played at 1990 Asian Games. He played 5 games for Japan in 1990.

== Club statistics ==
| Club performance | | | League | | Cup | | League Cup | | Total | |
| Season | Club | League | Apps | Goals | Apps | Goals | Apps | Goals | Apps | Goals |
| Japan | | | League | | Emperor's Cup | | J.League Cup | | Total | |
|---|---|---|---|---|---|---|---|---|---|---|
| 1985/86 | Yomiuri | JSL Division 1 | 7 | 0 | 0 | 0 | 0 | 0 | 7 | 0 |
| 1986/87 | Yomiuri | JSL Division 1 | 0 | 0 | 1 | 0 | 1 | 0 | 2 | 0 |
| 1987/88 | Yomiuri | JSL Division 1 | 8 | 3 | 1 | 0 | 0 | 0 | 9 | 3 |
| 1988/89 | Yomiuri | JSL Division 1 | 18 | 3 | 2 | 0 | 3 | 1 | 23 | 4 |
| 1989/90 | Yomiuri | JSL Division 1 | 21 | 3 | 4 | 1 | 4 | 1 | 29 | 5 |
| 1990/91 | Yomiuri | JSL Division 1 | 19 | 3 | 2 | 0 | 2 | 0 | 23 | 3 |
| 1991/92 | Yomiuri | JSL Division 1 | 16 | 1 | 2 | 0 | 4 | 0 | 22 | 1 |
| 1992 | Verdy Kawasaki | J1 League | - | | 2 | 0 | 8 | 1 | 10 | 1 |
| 1993 | Verdy Kawasaki | J1 League | 6 | 0 | 2 | 0 | 6 | 0 | 14 | 0 |
| 1994 | Urawa Reds | J1 League | 8 | 0 | 3 | 0 | 0 | 0 | 11 | 0 |
| 1995 | Urawa Reds | J1 League | 1 | 0 | 0 | 0 | - | | 1 | 0 |
| 1996 | Verdy Kawasaki | J1 League | 0 | 0 | 0 | 0 | 0 | 0 | 0 | 0 |
| Total | | | 104 | 13 | 19 | 1 | 28 | 3 | 151 | 17 |

== National team statistics ==
Japan national team
| Year | Apps | Goals |
|---|---|---|
| 1990 | 5 | 0 |
| Total | 5 | 0 |
