= Akira Nishino (footballer) =

Japanese football manager (born 1955)

Akira Nishino 西野 朗
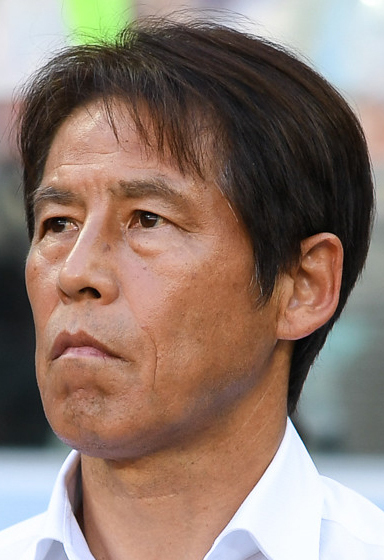
- Nishino as Japan manager at the 2018 World Cup

Personal information
- Full name: Akira Nishino
- Date of birth: 7 April 1955 (age 71)
- Place of birth: Saitama, Saitama, Japan
- Height: 1.82 m (6 ft 0 in)
- Position: Midfielder

Youth career
- 1971–1973: Urawa Nishi High School

College career
Years	Team	Apps	(Gls)
1974–1977	Waseda University		

Senior career*
Years	Team	Apps	(Gls)
1978–1990	Hitachi	143	(29)

International career
1977–1978	Japan	12	(1)

Managerial career
- 1991–1992: Japan U20
- 1994–1996: Japan U23
- 1998–2001: Kashiwa Reysol
- 2002–2011: Gamba Osaka
- 2012: Vissel Kobe
- 2014–2015: Nagoya Grampus
- 2018: Japan
- 2019–2021: Thailand U23
- 2019–2021: Thailand
Medal record
Hitachi
Runner-up	Japan Soccer League	1982
Runner-up	JSL Cup	1980
- * Club domestic league appearances and goals

Akira Nishino (西野 朗, Nishino Akira; born 7 April 1955) is a Japanese football manager and former player.

== Club career ==
Nishino was born in Saitama on 7 April 1955. After graduating from Waseda University, he joined Hitachi in 1978. The club won the 2nd place at 1980 JSL Cup and 1982 Japan Soccer League. He retired in 1990. He was elected Best Eleven in 1985–86.

== International career ==
In March 1977, when Nishino was a Waseda University student, he was selected in Japan national team for 1978 World Cup qualification. At this qualification, on 6 March, he debuted against Israel. He played 12 games and scored 1 goal for Japan until 1978.

== Managerial career ==
=== Early years ===
After retirement, in 1990, Nishino became a coach for Hitachi (later Kashiwa Reysol). From 1991, he managed the Japan U-20 national team and Japan U-23 national team. At U-23 Japan in 1996 Summer Olympics Qualifiers, Japan qualified to 1996 Summer Olympics for the first time in 28 years since 1968 Summer Olympics, where Japan won the bronze medal. At 1996 Olympics, although Japan won 2 matches, Japan lost in the First round. At this time, Japan beat Brazil in first game. It was known as the "Miracle of Miami" (マイアミの奇跡) in Japan.

=== Kashiwa Reysol ===
In 1997, Nishino returned to Kashiwa Reysol and became a coach. In 1998, he became a manager. In 1999, he led the club to win the 1999 J.League Cup. In 2000, the club won the 3rd place in J.League Division 1 for 2 years in a row and he received Best Managers award. However, he was sacked in July 2001.

=== Gamba Osaka ===
In 2002, Nishino signed with Gamba Osaka. In 2005, the club won J.League Division 1 for the first time in club history and he was elected for the Best Manager award. In 2008, the club won AFC Champions League and the 3rd place at 2008 FIFA Club World Cup. He was also elected AFC 'Coach of the Year' awards. The club also won the 2007 J.League Cup, the 2008 and the 2009 Emperor's Cup. He resigned in 2011. In May 2012, he signed with Vissel Kobe as Masahiro Wada's successor. However, he was sacked in November.

=== Nagoya Grampus ===
In 2014, Nishino signed with Nagoya Grampus and managed the club until 2015.

=== Japan national team ===
In March 2016, Nishino returned to the Japan Football Association as a technical director. In April 2018, Japan national team manager Vahid Halilhodžić was sacked and Nishino was named as the new manager. A big challenge for Nishino was lack of time for preparation, while also being doubted because of his lack of coaching experience. Nonetheless, in the 2018 World Cup, he registered history by helping Japan to beat Colombia 2–1, the first ever defeat of a CONMEBOL team to an Asian side. His brilliant tactics continued to be demonstrated when Japan held Senegal in a 2–2 draw. His Japan lost 0–1 to Poland in the final group match, but as Japan received fewer yellow cards than Senegal, Japan controversially qualified to the knockout stage, becoming the only Asian team to do so in the 2018 World Cup. However, his Japan lost 2–3 to Belgium despite having led 2–0, thus were eliminated from the tournament. Nishino stepped down once his current term expired following the World Cup.

=== Thailand national team ===
Nishino consented to take charge of the Thailand's senior and under-23 national sides on 17 July 2019, became the first Japanese to coach Thailand, and on 24 January 2020, this contract has been extended until 2022. On 29 July 2021, Football Association of Thailand announced that it had parted ways with Nishino, which was later explained due to poor performance in 2022 FIFA World Cup qualification.

== Career statistics ==
=== Club ===
Appearances and goals by club, season and competition
Club	Season	League		
Club	Season	Division	Apps	Goals
Hitachi	1978	JSL Division 1	13	1
Hitachi	1979	JSL Division 1	12	0
Hitachi	1980	JSL Division 1	15	6
Hitachi	1981	JSL Division 1	8	1
Hitachi	1982	JSL Division 1	15	4
Hitachi	1983	JSL Division 1	18	2
Hitachi	1984	JSL Division 1	17	2
Hitachi	1985–86	JSL Division 1	22	12
Hitachi	1986–87	JSL Division 1	17	1
Hitachi	1987–88	JSL Division 2		
Hitachi	1988–89	JSL Division 2		
Hitachi	1989–90	JSL Division 1	6	0
Career total			143	29

=== International ===
Appearances and goals by national team and year
National team	Year	Apps	Goals
Japan	1977	4	0
Japan	1978	8	1
Total		12	1

== Managerial statistics ==
As of match played 15 June 2021

Managerial record by team and tenure
Team	Nat	From	To	Record				
Team	Nat	From	To	G	W	D	L	Win %
Japan U23	(Japan)	1 January 1994	31 December 1996	1	0	0	1	0.00
Japan	(Japan)	20 July 1996	3 August 1996	3	2	0	1	66.67
Kashiwa Reysol	(Japan)	1 February 1998	30 July 2001	129	78	6	45	60.47
Gamba Osaka	(Japan)	1 February 2002	31 January 2012	461	247	87	127	53.58
Vissel Kobe	(Japan)	22 May 2012	8 November 2012	23	6	7	10	26.09
Nagoya Grampus	(Japan)	1 February 2014	31 January 2016	87	36	19	32	41.38
Japan	(Japan)	9 April 2018	31 July 2018	7	2	1	4	28.57
Thailand U23	(Thailand)	17 July 2019	29 July 2021	9	4	2	3	44.44
Thailand	(Thailand)	17 July 2019	29 July 2021	11	2	5	4	18.18
Career Total				731	377	127	227	51.57

== Honours ==
=== Manager ===
Kashiwa Reysol

- J.League Cup: 1999

Gamba Osaka

- J.League Division 1: 2005
- Emperor's Cup: 2008, 2009
- J.League Cup: 2007
- Japanese Super Cup: 2007
- AFC Champions League: 2008

=== Individual ===
- Japan Football Hall of Fame: Inducted in 2019

Player

- Japan Soccer League Best Eleven: 1985–86

Manager

- J.League Manager of the Year: 2000, 2005
- AFC Coach of the Year: 2008
