= Shigemitsu Sudo =

Japanese association football player

Shigemitsu Sudo 須藤 茂光
Personal information
- Full name: Shigemitsu Sudo
- Date of birth: April 2, 1956 (age 70)
- Place of birth: Mikasa, Hokkaido, Japan
- Height: 1.72 m (5 ft 7 1/2 in)
- Position: Defender

Youth career
- 1972–1974: Odawara Johoku Technical High School
- 1975–1978: Chuo University

Senior career*
Years	Team	Apps	(Gls)
1979–1987	Hitachi	117	(0)
Total		117	(0)

International career
1979–1981	Japan	13	(0)

Managerial career
- 2018–2020: Verspah Oita
- 2023-: Mynavi Sendai Ladies
Medal record
Hitachi
Runner-up	Japan Soccer League	1982
Runner-up	JSL Cup	1980
- * Club domestic league appearances and goals

Shigemitsu Sudo (須藤 茂光, Sudo Shigemitsu; born April 2, 1956) is a former Japanese football player and manager. He played for Japan national team.Currently, he is manager WE League club of Mynavi Sendai Ladies.

== Club career ==
Sudo was born in Mikasa on April 2, 1956. After graduating from Chuo University, he joined Hitachi in 1979. The club won the 2nd place in 1980 JSL Cup and 1982 Japan Soccer League. He retired in 1987. He played 117 games in the league.

== National team career ==
On August 23, 1979, Sudo debuted for Japan national team against North Korea. In 1980, he played at 1980 Summer Olympics qualification and 1982 World Cup qualification. He played 13 games for Japan until 1981.

== Coaching career ==
After retirement, Sudo mainly coached his alma mater Chuo University and some youth teams. In 2018, he signed with Japan Football League club Verspah Oita and became a manager.

In the middle of 2023, he became the manager of Mynavi Sendai Ladies.

== Club statistics ==
Club performance			League	
Season	Club	League	Apps	Goals
Japan			League	
1979	Hitachi	JSL Division 1	18	0
1980	Hitachi	JSL Division 1	16	0
1981	Hitachi	JSL Division 1	14	0
1982	Hitachi	JSL Division 1	11	0
1983	Hitachi	JSL Division 1	15	0
1984	Hitachi	JSL Division 1	14	0
1985/86	Hitachi	JSL Division 1	22	0
1986/87	Hitachi	JSL Division 1	7	0
Total			117	0

== National team statistics ==
Japan national team
Year	Apps	Goals
1979	1	0
1980	8	0
1981	4	0
Total	13	0
