= Yoshinori Ishigami =

Japanese footballer

Yoshinori Ishigami 石神 良訓
Personal information
- Full name: Yoshinori Ishigami
- Date of birth: November 4, 1957 (age 68)
- Place of birth: Shizuoka, Japan
- Height: 1.78 m (5 ft 10 in)
- Position: Defender

Youth career
- 1973–1975: Shizuoka Technical High School

Senior career*
Years	Team	Apps	(Gls)
1976–1990	Yamaha Motors		

International career
1984–1986	Japan	12	(0)
Medal record
Yamaha Motors
Winner	Japan Soccer League	1987/88
Runner-up	JSL Cup	1989
Winner	Emperor's Cup	1982
Runner-up	Emperor's Cup	1989
- * Club domestic league appearances and goals

Yoshinori Ishigami (石神 良訓, Ishigami Yoshinori; born November 4, 1957) is a former Japanese football player. He played for Japan national team.

== Club career ==
Ishigami was born in Shizuoka Prefecture on November 4, 1957. After graduating from high school, he joined the Prefectural Leagues club Yamaha Motors in 1976. The club was promoted to the Regional Leagues in 1977 and to the Japan Soccer League 1979. The club won the league championship in 1987–88. The club also won the 1982 Emperor's Cup. He retired in 1990. He was twice selected for the Best Eleven.

== National team career ==
On September 30, 1984, Ishigami debuted for Japan national team against South Korea. He played at 1986 World Cup qualification and 1986 Asian Games. He played 12 games for Japan until 1986.

== Club statistics ==
Club performance			League		Cup		League Cup		Total	
Season	Club	League	Apps	Goals	Apps	Goals	Apps	Goals	Apps	Goals
Japan			League		Emperor's Cup		JSL Cup		Total	
1976	Yamaha Motors	Prefectural Leagues								
1977	Yamaha Motors	Regional Leagues								
1978	Yamaha Motors	Regional Leagues								
1979	Yamaha Motors	JSL Division 2								
1980	Yamaha Motors	JSL Division 1	9	1					9	1
1981	Yamaha Motors	JSL Division 1	17	4					17	4
1982	Yamaha Motors	JSL Division 2	18	1					18	1
1983	Yamaha Motors	JSL Division 1	18	1					18	1
1984	Yamaha Motors	JSL Division 1	18	1					18	1
1985/86	Yamaha Motors	JSL Division 1	22	0					22	0
1986/87	Yamaha Motors	JSL Division 1	21	0					21	0
1987/88	Yamaha Motors	JSL Division 1	21	2					21	2
1988/89	Yamaha Motors	JSL Division 1	21	0					21	0
1989/90	Yamaha Motors	JSL Division 1	11	0			5	0	16	0
Total			158	9	0	0	5	0	163	9

== National team statistics ==
Japan national team
Year	Apps	Goals
1984	1	0
1985	8	0
1986	3	0
Total	12	0
