= Kazuaki Nagasawa =

Japanese footballer and manager

Kazuaki Nagasawa 長澤 和明
Personal information
- Full name: Kazuaki Nagasawa
- Date of birth: February 4, 1958 (age 68)
- Place of birth: Shizuoka, Shizuoka, Japan
- Height: 1.77 m (5 ft 9 1/2 in)
- Position: Midfielder

Youth career
- 1973–1975: Shimizu Higashi High School
- 1976–1979: Tokyo University of Agriculture

Senior career*
Years	Team	Apps	(Gls)
1980–1989	Yamaha Motors	123	(9)
Total		123	(9)

International career
1978–1985	Japan	9	(0)

Managerial career
- 1991–1993: Yamaha Motors
- 1995–1996: Suzuyo Shimizu FC Lovely Ladies
- 1997: Honda
- 1999–2001: Sony Sendai
Medal record
Yamaha Motors
Winner	Japan Soccer League	1987/88
Winner	Emperor's Cup	1982
- * Club domestic league appearances and goals

Kazuaki Nagasawa (長澤 和明, Nagasawa Kazuaki; born February 4, 1958) is a Japanese former football player and manager. He played for Japan national team. Actress Masami Nagasawa is his daughter.

== Club career ==
Nagasawa was born in Shizuoka on February 4, 1958. After graduating from Tokyo University of Agriculture, he joined Yamaha Motors in 1980. Although he played as regular player, he could not play in the game at the end of his career for injury. He retired in 1989. He played 123 games and scored 9 goals in the league.

== National team career ==
On July 13, 1978, when Nagasawa was a Tokyo University of Agriculture student, he debuted for Japan national team against Iraq. Although he did not play for Japan from 1979, in 1985, he played for Japan at 1986 World Cup qualification for the first time in 7 years. He played 9 games for Japan until 1985.

== Coaching career ==
After retirement, Nagasawa started coaching career at Yamaha Motors (later Júbilo Iwata). In 1991, he became a manager. He led the club to won 2nd place at Japan Football League in 1993 and promoted to J1 League. He resigned end of 1993 season. He signed with L.League club Suzuyo Shimizu FC Lovely Ladies in 1995. In 1997, he moved to Honda. In 1999, he signed with Sony Sendai and managed until August 2001. From 2001, he managed some university and high school.

== Club statistics ==
Club performance			League	
Season	Club	League	Apps	Goals
Japan			League	
1980	Yamaha Motors	JSL Division 1	17	0
1981	Yamaha Motors	JSL Division 1	18	2
1982	Yamaha Motors	JSL Division 2	15	1
1983	Yamaha Motors	JSL Division 1	17	1
1984	Yamaha Motors	JSL Division 1	9	2
1985/86	Yamaha Motors	JSL Division 1	18	2
1986/87	Yamaha Motors	JSL Division 1	21	1
1987/88	Yamaha Motors	JSL Division 1	0	0
1988/89	Yamaha Motors	JSL Division 1	0	0
Total			123	9

== National team statistics ==
Japan national team
Year	Apps	Goals
1978	6	0
1979	0	0
1980	0	0
1981	0	0
1982	0	0
1983	0	0
1984	0	0
1985	3	0
Total	9	0
