= 1992 in Japanese football =

1992 season

Japanese football in 1992

== Japan Football League ==
=== First Division ===
| Pos | Club | Pts | W | D | L | GF | GA | GD | Notes |
|---|---|---|---|---|---|---|---|---|---|
| 1 | Yamaha Motors | 44 | 13 | 5 | 0 | 37 | 6 | +31 | |
| 2 | Hitachi | 40 | 12 | 4 | 2 | 37 | 19 | +18 | |
| 3 | Fujita Industries | 31 | 9 | 4 | 5 | 37 | 22 | +15 | |
| 4 | Yanmar Diesel | 24 | 7 | 3 | 8 | 23 | 19 | +4 | |
| 5 | Toshiba | 23 | 6 | 5 | 7 | 30 | 29 | +1 | |
| 6 | Fujitsu | 20 | 5 | 5 | 8 | 19 | 27 | -8 | |
| 7 | Tokyo Gas | 20 | 5 | 5 | 8 | 22 | 34 | －12 | |
| 8 | Otsuka Pharmaceutical | 18 | 4 | 6 | 8 | 17 | 29 | －12 | |
| 9 | Honda | 16 | 4 | 4 | 10 | 19 | 36 | －17 | Relegated to Second Division |
| 10 | Nippon Kokan | 11 | 2 | 5 | 11 | 12 | 32 | －20 | Relegated to Second Division |

=== Second Division ===
Seino Unyu and Osaka Gas had been promoted automatically after winning the Regional Playoffs.

| Pos | Club | Pts | W | D | L | GF | GA | GD | Notes |
|---|---|---|---|---|---|---|---|---|---|
| 1 | Chuo Bohan | 38 | 12 | 2 | 4 | 46 | 21 | +25 | Promoted to First Division |
| 2 | Kyoto Shiko Club | 37 | 11 | 4 | 3 | 39 | 17 | +22 | Promoted to First Division |
| 3 | Kawasaki Steel | 35 | 11 | 2 | 5 | 32 | 17 | +15 | |
| 4 | Cosmo Oil | 30 | 9 | 3 | 6 | 26 | 21 | +5 | |
| 5 | Kofu Club | 28 | 9 | 1 | 8 | 26 | 29 | －3 | |
| 6 | NTT Kanto | 22 | 5 | 7 | 6 | 24 | 20 | +4 | |
| 7 | Seino Unyu | 19 | 4 | 7 | 7 | 20 | 29 | －9 | |
| 8 | Toho Titanium | 14 | 2 | 8 | 8 | 9 | 19 | －10 | |
| 9 | Tanabe Pharmaceutical | 14 | 3 | 5 | 10 | 17 | 32 | －15 | Relegated to Regional Leagues |
| 10 | Osaka Gas | 12 | 3 | 3 | 12 | 14 | 48 | －34 | Relegated to Regional Leagues |

== National team ==
=== Results ===
| 1992.05.31 | Japan | 0–1 | Argentina | Tokyo, Japan |
| | | JFA | ? (?) | Stadium: Tokyo National Stadium |

| 1992.06.07 | Japan | 0–1 | Wales | Ehime, Japan |
| | | JFA | ? (?) | Stadium: Ehime Matsuyama Athletic Stadium |

| 1992.08.22 | Japan | 0–0 | South Korea | Beijing, China PR |
| | | JFA |

| 1992.08.24 | Japan | 2–0 | China PR | Beijing, China PR |
| | Fukuda 38'; Takagi 82' | JFA |

| 1992.08.26 | Japan | 4–1 | North Korea | Beijing, China PR |
| | Fukuda 32'; Takagi 34', 46'; Miura 74' | JFA | ? (?) |

| 1992.08.29 | Japan | 2–2 (a.e.t.) (4–2 p) | South Korea | Beijing, China PR |
| | Nakayama 83'; Takagi 96' | JFA | ? (?) ? (?) |

| 1992.10.30 | Japan | 0–0 | United Arab Emirates | Hiroshima, Japan |
| | | JFA | | Stadium: Bingo Athletic Stadium |

| 1992.11.01 | Japan | 1–1 | North Korea | Hiroshima, Japan |
| | Nakayama 80' | JFA | ? (?) | Stadium: Hiroshima Big Arch |

| 1992.11.03 | Japan | 1–0 | Iran | Hiroshima, Japan |
| | Miura 85' | JFA | | Stadium: Hiroshima Big Arch |

| 1992.11.06 | Japan | 3–2 | China PR | Hiroshima, Japan |
| | Fukuda 48'; Kitazawa 57'; Nakayama 84' | JFA | ? (?) ? (?) | Stadium: Hiroshima Big Arch |

| 1992.11.08 | Japan | 1–0 | Saudi Arabia | Hiroshima, Japan |
| | Takagi 36' | JFA | | Stadium: Hiroshima Big Arch |

=== Players statistics ===
| Player | -1991 | 05.31 | 06.07 | 08.22 | 08.24 | 08.26 | 08.29 | 10.30 | 11.01 | 11.03 | 11.06 | 11.08 | 1992 | Total |
| Satoshi Tsunami | 55(2) | O | O | O | O | O | O | - | O | O | O | O | 10(0) | 65(2) |
| Takumi Horiike | 33(1) | O | O | O | - | - | - | O | - | O | O | O | 7(0) | 40(1) |
| Masami Ihara | 24(0) | O | O | O | O | O | O | O | O | O | O | O | 11(0) | 35(0) |
| Tetsuji Hashiratani | 23(3) | O | O | O | O | O | O | O | O | O | O | O | 11(0) | 34(3) |
| Toshinobu Katsuya | 12(0) | O | O | O | O | O | O | O | O | - | - | O | 9(0) | 21(0) |
| Hiroshi Hirakawa | 12(0) | - | O | - | - | - | - | - | - | - | - | - | 1(0) | 13(0) |
| Mitsunori Yoshida | 11(1) | - | O | O | O | O | O | O | - | O | - | O | 8(0) | 19(1) |
| Shigetatsu Matsunaga | 11(0) | O | - | O | O | O | O | O | O | O | O | - | 9(0) | 20(0) |
| Nobuhiro Takeda | 10(1) | O | O | - | - | - | - | - | - | - | - | - | 2(0) | 12(1) |
| Masahiro Fukuda | 7(0) | - | - | O | O(1) | O(1) | O | - | O | O | O(1) | O | 8(3) | 15(3) |
| Kazuyoshi Miura | 5(0) | O | O | O | O | O(1) | O | O | O | O(1) | O | O | 11(2) | 16(2) |
| Ruy Ramos | 5(0) | O | - | O | O | O | O | O | O | O | O | O | 10(0) | 15(0) |
| Tsuyoshi Kitazawa | 2(0) | O | O | O | O | O | O | O | O | O | O(1) | O | 11(1) | 13(1) |
| Tetsuya Asano | 2(0) | - | - | - | O | O | O | - | - | - | - | - | 3(0) | 5(0) |
| Masashi Nakayama | 1(0) | O | - | - | - | O | O(1) | - | O(1) | O | O(1) | - | 6(3) | 7(3) |
| Takuya Takagi | 0(0) | O | O | O | O(1) | O(2) | O(1) | O | O | O | O | O(1) | 11(5) | 11(5) |
| Hajime Moriyasu | 0(0) | O | O | O | - | - | - | O | O | O | O | - | 7(0) | 7(0) |
| Kazuya Maekawa | 0(0) | - | O | - | - | - | - | - | - | - | O | O | 3(0) | 3(0) |

== Births ==
- 21 May: Shoma Doi
