= 1980 JSL Cup final =

Nippon Kokan	Hitachi
3	1
- Date: August 24, 1980
- Venue: Osaka Nagai Stadium, Osaka

1980 JSL Cup final was the fifth final of the JSL Cup competition. The final was played at Osaka Nagai Stadium in Osaka on August 24, 1980. Nippon Kokan won the championship.

== Overview ==
Nippon Kokan won their 1st title, by defeating Hitachi 3–1.

== Match details ==
August 24, 1980

Nippon Kokan	3-1	Hitachi
? (?) ? (?) ? (?)		? (?)

Osaka Nagai Stadium

== See also ==
- 1980 JSL Cup
