= 1984 JSL Cup final =

Yanmar Diesel	Toshiba
3	0
- Date: April 15, 1984
- Venue: Komazawa Olympic Park Stadium, Tokyo

1984 JSL Cup final was the ninth final of the JSL Cup competition. The final was played at Komazawa Olympic Park Stadium in Tokyo on April 15, 1984. Yanmar Diesel won the championship.

== Overview ==
Defending champion Yanmar Diesel won their 3rd title, by defeating Toshiba 3–0. Yanmar Diesel won the title for 2 years in a row.

== Match details ==
April 15, 1984

Yanmar Diesel	3-0	Toshiba
? (?) ? (?) ? (?)

Komazawa Olympic Park Stadium

== See also ==
- 1984 JSL Cup
