= Tetsuo Sugamata =

Japanese footballer

Tetsuo Sugamata 菅又 哲男
Personal information
- Full name: Tetsuo Sugamata
- Date of birth: November 29, 1957 (age 68)
- Place of birth: Utsunomiya, Tochigi, Japan
- Height: 1.79 m (5 ft 10 1/2 in)
- Position: Defender

Youth career
- 1973–1975: Saitama Urawa Minami High School
- 1976–1979: Hosei University

Senior career*
Years	Team	Apps	(Gls)
1980–1987	Hitachi		

International career
1978–1984	Japan	23	(0)
Medal record
Hitachi
Runner-up	Japan Soccer League	1982
Runner-up	JSL Cup	1980
- * Club domestic league appearances and goals

Tetsuo Sugamata (菅又 哲男, Sugamata Tetsuo; born November 29, 1957) is a former Japanese football player. He played for Japan national team.

== Club career ==
Sugamata was born in Utsunomiya on November 29, 1957. After graduating from Hosei University, he joined Hitachi in 1980. The club won the 2nd place in 1980 JSL Cup, 1982 Japan Soccer League. He retired in 1987. He played 131 games in the league. He was selected Best Eleven in 1980 and 1982).

== National team career ==
On July 23, 1978, when Sugamata was a Hosei University student, he debuted for Japan national team against Singapore. After he joined Hitachi, he played for Japan again in June 1980. In December, he was selected Japan for 1982 World Cup qualification. In 1982, he also played at 1982 Asian Games. He played 23 games for Japan until 1984.

== National team statistics ==
Japan national team
Year	Apps	Goals
1978	1	0
1979	0	0
1980	7	0
1981	3	0
1982	6	0
1983	5	0
1984	1	0
Total	23	0
