= Konica Cup (football) =

Football cup competition in Japan

The Konica Cup was a football cup competition in Japan, run by the Japan Soccer League as a prelude to the 1992 Summer Olympics. Only JSL First Division clubs were allowed to compete. Along with the JSL Cup it was a predecessor to the J. League Cup, but also involving the Japanese Olympic and Youth teams. The J. League Cup would later copy the format of a cup having only top division teams. No draws were allowed, instead draws were settled by extra time and penalty kicks.

== 1990 ==
=== Group A ===
P	Club	PTS	W	L	GF	GA	GD
1	Yamaha Motor	18	5	1	11	4	7
2	Yomiuri S.C.	16	4	2	12	3	9
3	Matsushita	15	4	2	8	7	1
4	Furukawa Electric	12	4	2	6	4	2
5	NKK F.C.	9	3	3	4	6	-2
6	Toyota Motor	4	1	5	5	8	-3
7	Japan Youth	0	0	6	3	17	-14

=== Group B ===
P	Club	PTS	W	L	GF	GA	GD
1	ANA	20	5	1	10	4	6
2	Toshiba	16	4	2	11	9	2
3	Mitsubishi Motors	13	4	2	6	4	2
4	Nissan Motors	12	3	3	9	6	3
5	Honda Motor	8	3	3	4	5	-1
6	Yanmar Diesel	6	2	4	4	9	-5
7	Japan Olympic	2	0	6	6	13	-7

Semifinals:
Yomiuri 5 ANA 0
Yamaha 2 Toshiba 0

Final: Yamaha Motor 1 Yomiuri 2

== 1991 ==
This season the Japanese youth team sat out.

=== Group A ===
P	Club	PTS	W	L	GF	GA	GD
1	Toyota Motor	21	5	0	15	5	10
2	Honda Motor	17	4	1	11	7	4
3	Matsushita	12	3	2	9	11	-2
4	Yomiuri S.C.	9	2	3	8	8	0
5	ANA	3	1	4	2	10	-8
6	Hitachi	1	0	5	2	6	-4

=== Group B ===
P	Club	PTS	W	L	GF	GA	GD
1	JR Furukawa	19	5	1	11	5	6
2	Nissan Motors	16	4	2	10	4	6
3	Yamaha Motor	11	3	3	7	8	-1
4	Mazda	11	3	3	6	8	-2
5	Toshiba	9	2	4	8	7	1
6	Mitsubishi Motors	8	2	4	6	9	-3
7	Japan Olympic	8	2	4	8	15	-7

Semifinals:
Nissan Motors 0 Toyota Motor 2
JR Furukawa 0 Honda Motor 1

Final: Toyota Motor 6 (a.e.t.) Honda Motor 5

== Sources ==
- Contents of Domestic Competition of Football in Japan
