= Konica Minolta Cup =

Konica Minolta Cup may refer to

- Japan LPGA Championship Konica Minolta Cup, was a golf competition
- WRU Challenge Cup, a Welsh rugby union competition

Konica Cup (before the Minolta merger) may refer to

- Konica Cup (football), a football competition
