= 1987 JSL Cup final =

Nippon Kokan	Sumitomo Metal
3	0
- Date: July 19, 1987
- Venue: Nagoya Mizuho Athletics Stadium, Aichi

1987 JSL Cup final was the 12th final of the JSL Cup competition. The final was played at Nagoya Mizuho Athletics Stadium in Aichi on July 19, 1987. Nippon Kokan won the championship.

== Overview ==
Nippon Kokan won their 2nd title, by defeating Sumitomo Metal 3–0.

== Match details ==
July 19, 1987

Nippon Kokan	3-0	Sumitomo Metal
? ?' ? ?' ? ?'

Nagoya Mizuho Athletics Stadium

== See also ==
- 1987 JSL Cup
