= 1989 JSL Cup final =

Nissan Motors	Yamaha Motors
1	0
- Date: September 16, 1989
- Venue: Toyohashi Football Stadium, Aichi

1989 JSL Cup final was the 14th final of the JSL Cup competition. The final was played at Toyohashi Football Stadium in Aichi on September 16, 1989. Nissan Motors won the championship.

== Overview ==
Defending champion Nissan Motors won their 2nd title, by defeating Yamaha Motors 1–0 with Takashi Mizunuma goal. Nissan Motors won the title for 2 years in a row.

== Match details ==
September 16, 1989

Nissan Motors	1-0	Yamaha Motors
Takashi Mizunuma 26'

Toyohashi Football Stadium

== See also ==
- 1989 JSL Cup
