= 1984 JSL Cup =

Tournament details
- Country: Japan

Final positions
- Champions: Yanmar Diesel
- Runners-up: Toshiba
- Semifinalists: Hitachi; Honda

Statistics of JSL Cup in the 1984 season.

== Overview ==
It was contested by 20 teams, and Yanmar Diesel won the championship.

== Results ==
=== 1st round ===
- Nippon Kokan 2-0 All Nippon Airways
- Yomiuri 4-2 Fujitsu
- Nissan Motors 1-0 Toyota Motors
- Furukawa Electric 1-1 (PK 3–2) Nippon Steel

=== 2nd round ===
- Yamaha Motors 0-1 Matsushita Electric
- Nippon Kokan 0-2 Hitachi
- Mazda 4-1 Yomiuri
- Yanmar Diesel 3-1 Sumitomo Metals
- Honda 3-0 Kofu
- Nissan Motors 0-0 (PK 4–5) Mitsubishi Motors
- Fujita Industries 0-2 Furukawa Electric
- Toshiba 2-1 Tanabe Pharmaceuticals

=== Quarterfinals ===
- Matsushita Electric 1-2 Hitachi
- Mazda 0-3 Yanmar Diesel
- Honda 2-0 Mitsubishi Motors
- Furukawa Electric 0-1 Toshiba

=== Semifinals ===
- Hitachi 2-2 (PK 3–4) Yanmar Diesel
- Honda 0-1 Toshiba

=== Final ===
- Yanmar Diesel 3-0 Toshiba

Yanmar Diesel won the cup
