= Adílson (footballer, born 1959) =

Brazilian footballer

Personal information
- Full name: Adílson Luíz Anastácio
- Date of birth: January 10, 1959 (age 67)
- Place of birth: Brazil
- Height: 1.75 m (5 ft 9 in)
- Position: Forward

Senior career*
Years	Team	Apps	(Gls)
- AA Internacional
1985	Ponte Preta		
- Corinthians
1987	XV de Jaú		
1987–1989	Yamaha Motors		
- * Club domestic league appearances and goals

Adílson Luíz Anastácio, or simply known as Adílson (born January 10, 1959) is a Brazilian former football player.

He played for Ponte Preta in the Campeonato Brasileiro.

== Personal honors ==
- Japan Soccer League First Division Top Scorer – 1988/89
