= Honda FC =

Japanese football club

Honda Football Club ホンダフットボールクラブ
- Full name: Honda Motor Football Club
- Founded: 1971; 55 years ago
- Ground: Honda Miyakoda Soccer Stadium; Hamamatsu, Shizuoka
- Capacity: 4,000
- Owner: Honda Motor Company
- Chairman: Masaaki Miyaji
- Manager: Shota Itokazu
- League: Japan Football League
- 2025: 1st of 16 (champions)
- Website: www.honda-fc.gr.jp
Home colours	Away colours

Honda Football Club (ホンダフットボールクラブ, Honda Futtobōru Kurabu) commonly known as Honda FC (ホンダFC, Honda Efu Shī) is a Japanese professional football club based in Hamamatsu, Shizuoka. They currently play in the Japan Football League, the country's 4th tier of semi-professional league football.

== History ==
The club was founded as Honda Motor, Honda works team in 1971. They were promoted to the Japan Soccer League Division 2 in 1975 and to the JSL Division 1 in 1981. While still in Division 2, Honda was invited to a friendly match at Aloha Stadium in Hawaii against New York Cosmos (at the time featuring Brazilian legend Pelé as their top star) and lost 5–0.

The closest they came to the JSL title was in 1985–86 and 1990–91 seasons, when they finished in third place. In 1991 they also made the finals of both the Japan Soccer League Cup and Konica Cup, but lost both times. They also made the Emperor's Cup semi-finals in 1990 and 1991. They stayed in the top flight until the conclusion of the league in 1992.

In the early 1990s, the club considered the possibilities of turning professional and participating in J. League. They sought the merger with their sister club Honda Motor Sayama F.C. and Urawa was chosen as a possible hometown. However, they failed to persuade the owner Honda Motor who insisted they should abide by their principle to concentrate on their core business of automobile manufacturing.

As a result of this decision, many players left the club. They played in the newly formed Japan Football League Division 1 in 1992 and finished 9th out of 10. They were relegated to Division 2 where they won the championship in 1993. The 2 divisions of the JFL were merged in 1994 and the club joined the league.

In 1996, they won the championship in the JFL. Around that time, the club made the second effort to be a professional club. They acquired associate membership in J. League under new name Acute Hamamatsu but the inadequate stadium and insufficient local support (the closest professional club is Júbilo Iwata, formerly part of Yamaha Motor Corporation), forced them to give it up. Iwata was a common derby foe in the JSL and their fixtures were known as Tenryu-side Derby (天竜川決戦).

In 1999, the JFL was reorganised as the new JFL. They have been playing in the league since its inception.

== J's Gatekeeper ==
Honda F.C. does not aim to be promoted to the J. League due to the mandatory loss of corporate backing. They provide a hurdle for independent sides wishing to gain promotion, which requires teams to finish in the top two in the league. Honda perennially occupying one of these spots makes their challenge even more difficult. Supporters of these clubs have dubbed Honda F.C. as J's Gatekeeper (the Gatekeeper of J. League).

Honda F.C., having played in the old Japan Soccer League in the past but never contending for the title, has in 2007 given some J1 teams a run for their money in the Emperor's Cup, reaching the quarterfinals after disposing of former champions Kashiwa Reysol and top contenders Nagoya Grampus (their first quarterfinals since 1991). They were nevertheless defeated by J1 champions Kashima Antlers on 22 December. The 2008 cup did not go well for them, as they were eliminated by Sagan Tosu 4–0 in the third round, but they still won the JFL championship.

== Stadium ==
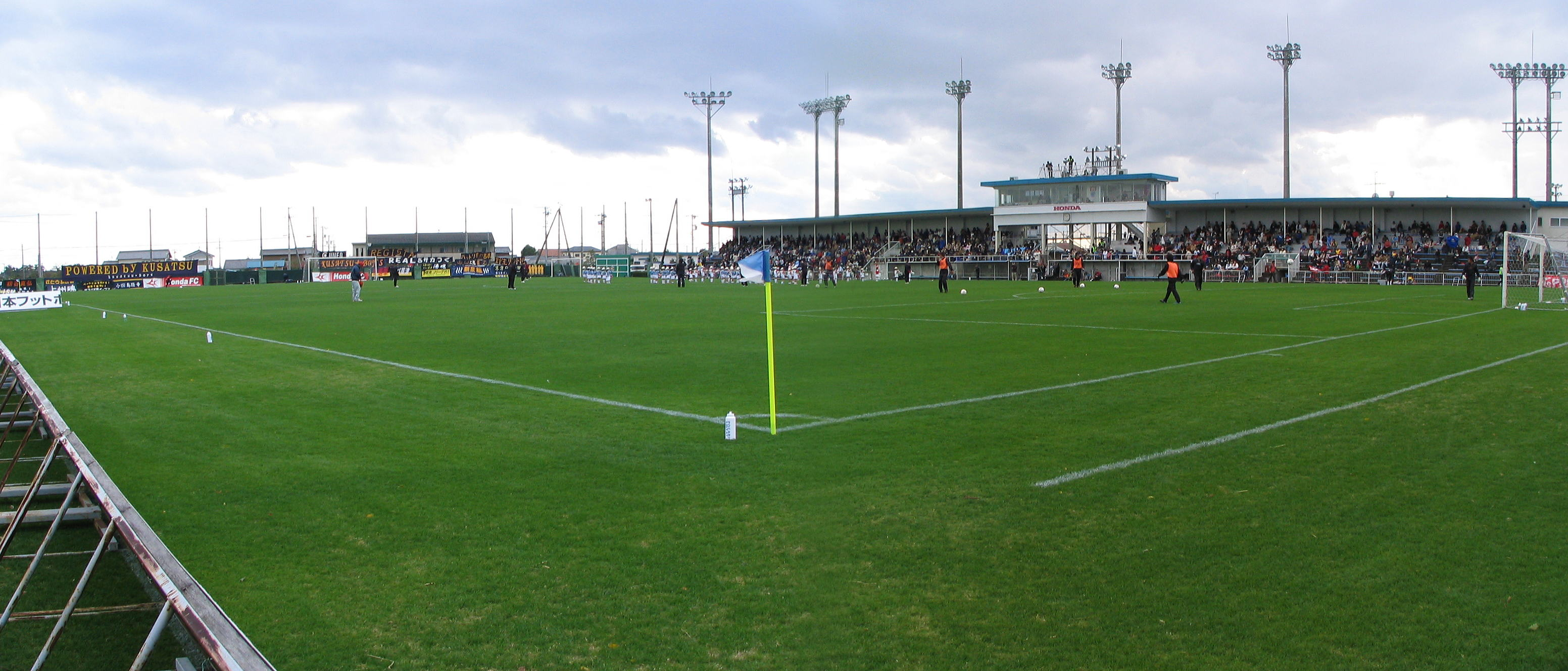
Miyakoda Soccer Stadium

The club's home arena is the Honda Miyakoda Soccer Stadium located in Hamana-ku, Hamamatsu. It is owned by Honda Motor Company. The stadium was redeveloped in 1996. This reconstruction included the building of a new mobile platform (1,000 seats) and corner floodlights. The stadium now holds 4,000 spectators.

== League & cup record ==
Champions	Runners-up	Third place	Promoted	Relegated

League													League Cup	Emperor's Cup
Season	Division	Tier	Teams	Pos.	P	W	D	L	F	A	GD	Pts	League Cup	Emperor's Cup
1971	Western Shizuoka			1st									–	Did not qualify
1972	Shizuoka			1st									–	Did not qualify
1973	Tōkai	-	8	1st	14	12	1	1	48	13	35	25	–	3rd round
1974	Tōkai	-	10	1st	13	9	3	1	53	11	42	21	–	2nd round
1975	JSL Div.2	2	10	4th	18	10	2	6	33	29	4	22	–	Did not qualify
1976	JSL Div.2	2	10	4th	18	6	9	3	25	17	8	21	Quarter final	1st round
1977	JSL Div.2	2	10	7th	18	8	0	10	25	24	1	29	Semi final	2nd round
1978	JSL Div.2	2	10	1st	18	14	0	4	39	9	30	57	Quarter final	2nd round
1979	JSL Div.2	2	10	4th	18	11	0	7	31	25	6	44	2nd round	2nd round
1980	JSL Div.2	2	10	1st	18	13	2	3	43	17	26	28	2nd round	2nd round
1981	JSL Div.1	1	10	6th	18	5	4	9	23	28	-5	14	2nd round	2nd round
1982	JSL Div.1	1	10	9th	18	4	6	8	17	29	-12	14	Quarter final	1st round
1983	JSL Div.1	1	10	8th	18	4	6	8	17	23	-6	14	Quarter final	Quarter final
1984	JSL Div.1	1	10	5th	18	7	5	6	26	23	3	19	Semi final	Quarter final
1985–86	JSL Div.1	1	12	3rd	22	8	12	2	30	20	10	28	Semi final	2nd round
1986–87	JSL Div.1	1	12	9th	22	6	8	8	20	24	-4	20	Semi final	Quarter final
1987–88	JSL Div.1	1	12	8th	22	6	8	8	19	22	-3	20	Semi final	Quarter final
1988–89	JSL Div.1	1	12	9th	22	7	6	9	20	23	-3	27	2nd round	Quarter final
1989–90	JSL Div.1	1	12	6th	22	10	2	10	32	29	3	22	2nd round	2nd round
1990–91	JSL Div.1	1	12	3rd	22	10	8	4	29	21	8	38	Semi final	Semi-final
1991–92	JSL Div.1	1	12	10th	22	5	8	9	18	25	-7	23	Final	Semi-final
1992	JFL (former) Div.1	2	10	9th	18	4	4	10	19	36	-17	16	Not eligible	2nd round
1993	JFL (former) Div.2	3	10	1st	18	15	-	3	62	21	41	-	Not eligible	Did not qualify
1994	JFL (former)	2	16	9th	30	12	-	18	49	62	-13	-	Not eligible	Did not qualify
1995	JFL (former)	2	16	7th	30	16	-	14	58	42	16	49	Not eligible	1st round
1996	JFL (former)	2	16	1st	30	25	-	5	83	3	48	75	Not eligible	3rd round
1997	JFL (former)	2	16	4th	30	23	-	7	60	37	23	65	Not eligible	3rd round
1998	JFL (former)	2	16	5th	30	19	-	11	57	45	12	54	Not eligible	4th round
1999	JFL	3	9	2nd	24	18	1	5	69	34	35	50	Not eligible	3rd round
2000	JFL	3	12	2nd	22	17	0	5	51	29	22	49	Not eligible	3rd round
2001	JFL	3	16	1st	30	22	5	3	74	19	55	71	Not eligible	3rd round
2002	JFL	3	18	1st	17	13	2	2	39	14	25	41	Not eligible	3rd round
2003	JFL	3	16	2nd	30	21	4	5	73	30	43	67	Not eligible	3rd round
2004	JFL	3	16	2nd	30	19	5	6	64	36	28	62	Not eligible	4th round
2005	JFL	3	16	5th	30	17	5	8	59	37	22	56	Not eligible	4th round
2006	JFL	3	18	1st	34	26	5	3	77	36	41	83	Not eligible	4th round
2007	JFL	3	18	5th	34	16	10	8	61	42	19	58	Not eligible	Quarter final
2008	JFL	3	18	1st	34	22	8	4	80	33	47	74	Not eligible	3rd round
2009	JFL	3	18	7th	34	13	12	9	49	38	11	51	Not eligible	2nd round
2010	JFL	3	18	4th	34	18	5	11	52	43	9	59	Not eligible	2nd round
2011	JFL	3	18	6th	34	15	7	11	40	36	4	52	Not eligible	Did not qualify
2012	JFL	3	17	5th	32	16	5	11	55	39	16	53	Not eligible	Did not qualify
2013	JFL	3	18	5th	34	14	11	9	54	38	16	53	Not eligible	Did not qualify
2014	JFL	4	14	1st	26	16	5	5	58	28	30	53	Not eligible	Did not qualify
2015	JFL	4	16	3rd	30	21	5	4	73	22	51	68	Not eligible	Did not qualify
2016	JFL	4	16	1st	30	18	7	5	52	29	23	61	Not eligible	Round of 16
2017	JFL	4	16	1st	30	21	7	2	72	20	52	70	Not eligible	2nd round
2018	JFL	4	16	1st	30	25	4	1	76	25	51	79	Not eligible	2nd round
2019	JFL	4	16	1st	30	19	6	5	59	30	29	63	Not eligible	Quarter final
2020	JFL	4	16	4th	15	5	7	3	20	12	8	22	Not eligible	Quarter final
2021	JFL	4	17	2nd	32	20	5	5	69	25	44	67	Not eligible	3rd round
2022	JFL	4	16	3rd	30	16	8	6	47	23	24	56	Not eligible	2nd round
2023	JFL	4	15	1st	28	14	8	5	48	25	23	50	Not eligible	2nd round
2024	JFL	4	16	7th	30	11	10	9	34	27	7	43	Not eligible	2nd round
2025	JFL	4	16	1st	30	17	9	4	51	28	23	60	Not eligible	1st round
2026–27	JFL	4	16	TBD	30								Not eligible	TBD

Key

- Pos. = Position in league; P = Games played; W = Games won; D = Games drawn; L = Games lost; F = Goals scored; A = Goals conceded; GD = Goals difference; Pts = Points gained
- Source: JFL, Honda FC website

== Honours ==
Honda FC honours
Honour	No.	Years
All Japan Senior Football Championship	2	1974, 1999
Japan Soccer League Division 2	2	1978, 1980
Japan Football League (former) Division 2	1	1993
Japan Football League (former)	1	1996
Japan Football League	11	2001, 2002, 2006, 2008, 2014, 2016, 2017, 2018, 2019, 2023, 2025

== Current squad ==
As of 1 October 2025

Note: Flags indicate national team as defined under FIFA eligibility rules; some limited exceptions apply. Players may hold more than one non-FIFA nationality.

No.	Pos.	Nation	Player
1	GK	JPN	Yuta Aoki (captain)
2	DF	JPN	Daiki Ikematsu
3	DF	JPN	Yusuke Kishida
4	DF	JPN	Yuta Hachinohe
5	MF	JPN	Yuya Suzuki
6	MF	JPN	Ryusei Kusakari
7	MF	JPN	Kazuki Matsumoto
8	MF	JPN	Toshiki Sasaki
9	FW	JPN	Reon Kodama
10	FW	JPN	Riku Suzuki
11	DF	JPN	Hayato Kawabata
13	FW	JPN	Yuki Okazaki
14	MF	JPN	Ryo Saito

No.	Pos.	Nation	Player
15	MF	JPN	Oura Ishihara
16	DF	JPN	Tappei Kawanami
17	MF	JPN	Fumiya Matsuoka
18	FW	JPN	Yumenosuke Shoji
19	MF	JPN	Kenshin Iwakiri
21	GK	JPN	Yuki Kusumoto
22	DF	JPN	Koshiro Chibana
23	MF	JPN	Ren Higashi
24	DF	JPN	Go Takeda
25	DF	JPN	Daichi Miwa
26	MF	JPN	Akihiko Terada
32	GK	JPN	Jun Kasai

== Coaching staff ==
Position	Staff
Manager	(Japan) Hidekazu Kobayashi
Assistant Manager	(Japan) Takahiro Tsuchiya (Japan) Shota Itokazu
Goalkeeper coach	(Japan) Moto Nakamura
Physical coach	(Japan) Shoji Takagi
Analyst	(Japan) Tatsuya Furuhashi
Trainer	(Japan) Masataka Oba (Japan) Tomoya Oba
Manager	(Japan) Shunsei Mashiyama

== Managerial history ==
Manager	Nationality	Tenure	
Manager	Nationality	Start	Finish
Katsuyoshi Kuwabara	Japan	1 February 1973	31 January 1983
Masakatsu Miyamoto	Japan	1 February 1983	30 June 1990
Masataka Imai	Japan	1 July 1990	31 December 1992
Kazuaki Nagasawa	Japan	1 February 1997	31 January 1998
Akiyoshi Ohashi	Japan	1 January 2000	31 December 2001
Takayoshi Amma	Japan	1 February 2002	31 January 2005
Hideo Yoshizawa	Japan	1 February 2005	31 December 2006
Masakazu Ishibashi	Japan	1 January 2007	31 December 2009
Takahiro Ōkubo	Japan	1 January 2010	31 December 2011
Yoshitaka Maeda	Japan	1 February 2012	31 January 2014
Hiroyasu Ibata	Japan	1 February 2014	31 January 2021
Hiroyuki Abe	Japan	1 February 2021	31 January 2023
Hidekazu Kobayashi	Japan	1 February 2023	31 January 2025
Shota Itokazu	Japan	1 February 2025	current

== Kit evolution ==
Home kit - 1st
2003 - 2004	2005 - 2006	2007 - 2008	2009 - 2010	2011 - 2012
2013 - 2014	2015 - 2016	2017 - 2018	2019	2020
2021	2022	2023	2024	2025 -

Away kit - 2nd
2003 - 2004	2005 - 2006	2007 - 2008	2009 - 2010	2011 - 2012
2013 - 2014	2015 - 2016	2017 - 2018	2019	2020
2021	2022	2023	2024	2025 -
