= 1981 Emperor's Cup =

Japanaese annual football competition

Tournament details
- Country: Japan

Final positions
- Champions: Nippon Kokan
- Runners-up: Yomiuri FC
- Semifinalists: Nippon Steel; Tsukuba University

Statistics of Emperor's Cup in the 1981 season.

== Overview ==
It was contested by 28 teams, and Nippon Kokan won the championship.

== Results ==
=== 1st round ===
- Teijin 1–3 Toyota Motors
- Mazda 1–2 Kyushu Sangyo University
- Dainichi Cable Industries 0–2 Nippon Steel
- Yomiuri 2–0 Osaka University of Commerce
- Kawasaki Steel Mizushima 1–3 Matsushita Electric
- Waseda University 6–0 Gonohe Town Hall
- Fukuoka University 1–4 Doshisha University
- Tsukuba University 6–0 YKK
- Fujitsu 1–3 Hitachi
- Yamaha Motors 1–2 Nissan Motors
- Aichi Gakuin University 0–3 Honda
- Nippon Kokan 6–1 Fujita Industries

=== 2nd round ===
- Yanmar Diesel 2–1 Toyota Motors
- Kyushu Sangyo University 1–3 Nippon Steel
- Yomiuri 1–0 Matsushita Electric
- Waseda University 0–3 Mitsubishi Motors
- Furukawa Electric 11–4 Doshisha University
- Tsukuba University 3–1 Hitachi
- Nissan Motors 1–2 Honda
- Nippon Kokan 2–1 Fujita Industries

=== Quarterfinals ===
- Yanmar Diesel 1–2 Nippon Steel
- Yomiuri 0–0 (PK 7–6) Mitsubishi Motors
- Furukawa Electric 1–2 Tsukuba University
- Honda 2–4 Nippon Kokan

=== Semifinals ===
- Nippon Steel 0–0 (PK 3–5) Yomiuri
- Tsukuba University 0–1 Nippon Kokan

=== Final ===
- Yomiuri 0–2 Nippon Kokan

Nippon Kokan won the championship.
