= Osaka Gas SC =

Japanese football club

Osaka Gas S.C.
- Full name: Osaka Gas Soccer Club
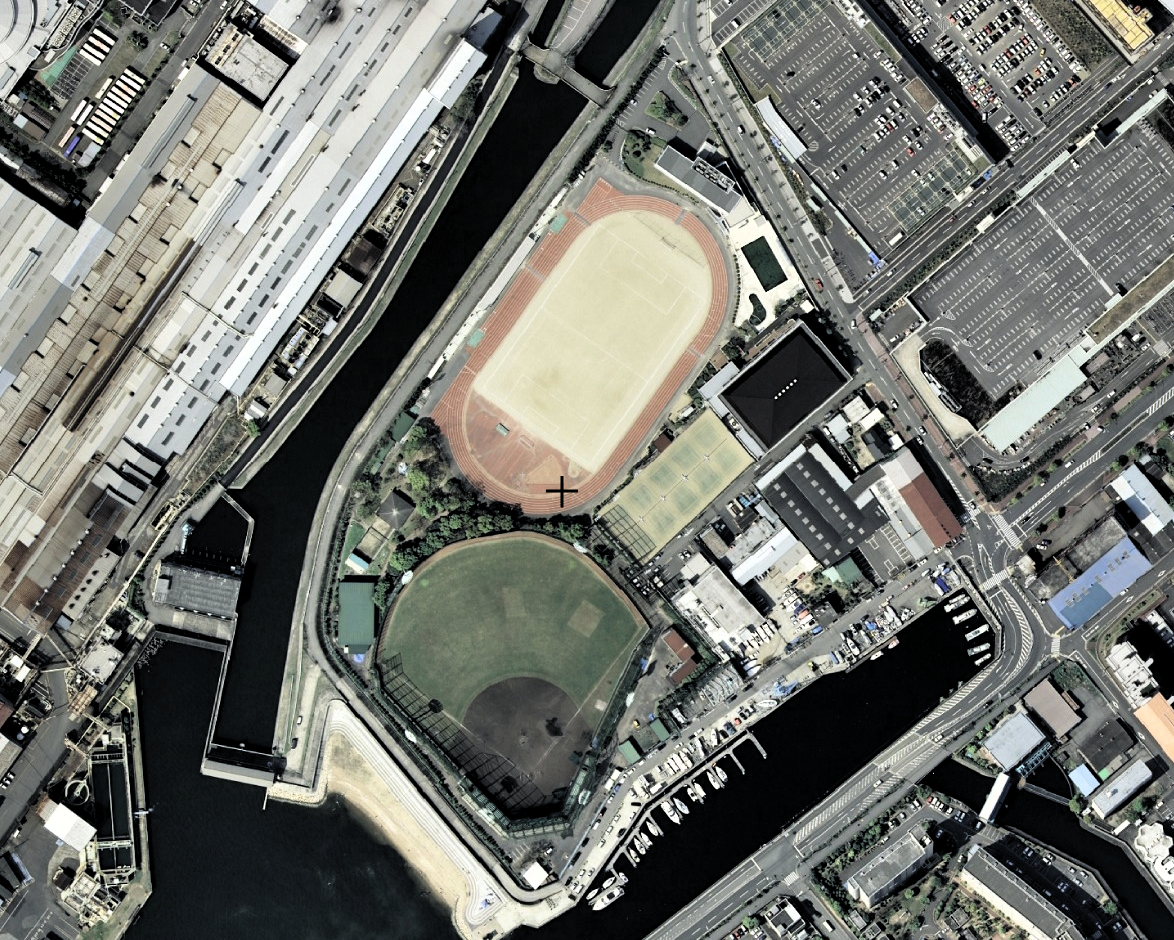
- Ground: Osaka Gas Stadium, Osaka, Japan
- League: Prefectural Leagues

Osaka Gas Soccer Club is a Japanese football club based in Osaka. The club has played in Japan Soccer League Division 2. Currently plays in Japanese Prefectural Leagues.
