= 1980 JSL Cup =

Tournament details
- Country: Japan

Final positions
- Champions: Nippon Kokan
- Runners-up: Hitachi
- Semifinalists: Nissan Motors FC; Teijin Matsuyama

Statistics of JSL Cup in the 1980 season.

== Overview ==
It was contested by 20 teams, and Nippon Kokan won the championship.

== Results ==
=== 1st round ===
- Yomiuri 3-2 Yamaha Motors
- Furukawa Electric 3-2 Fujita Industries
- Honda 3-0 Tanabe Pharmaceuticals
- Yanmar Diesel 2-0 Fujitsu

=== 2nd round ===
- Hitachi 5-1 Sumitomo Metals
- Yomiuri 1-3 Toyo Industries
- Mitsubishi Motors 0-1 Furukawa Electric
- Nissan Motors 2-0 Daikyo Oil
- Nippon Steel 2-4 Nippon Kokan
- Honda 0-1 Toshiba
- Kofu 0-3 Yanmar Diesel
- Teijin Matsuyama 4-2 Toyota Motors

=== Quarterfinals ===
- Hitachi 4-1 Toyo Industries
- Furukawa Electric 1-1 (PK 4–5) Nissan Motors
- Nippon Kokan 1-0 Toshiba
- Yanmar Diesel 1-2 Teijin Matsuyama

=== Semifinals ===
- Hitachi 2-0 Nissan Motors
- Nippon Kokan 2-1 Teijin Matsuyama

=== Final ===
- Hitachi 1-3 Nippon Kokan

Nippon Kokan won the championship
