= 1986 Emperor's Cup =

Tournament details
- Country: Japan

Final positions
- Champions: Yomiuri FC (2nd title)
- Runners-up: Nippon Kokan
- Semifinalists: Nissan Motors; Yamaha Motors

Statistics of Emperor's Cup in the 1986 season.

== Overview ==
It was contested by 32 teams, and Yomiuri won the championship.

== Results ==
=== 1st round ===
- Furukawa Electric (withdrew) – Hyōgo Teachers
- Teijin 0–1 Osaka Gas
- Yomiuri 3–1 Fukuoka University
- Yawata Steel 1–1 (PK 8–7) Hitachi
- Nissan Motors 3–0 Kawasaki Steel Mizushima
- NTT Kansai 0–4 Mazda
- Seino Transportation SC 3–2 Tanabe Pharmaceuticals
- Kochi University 0–3 Fujita Industries
- Honda 3–0 Kofu
- All Nippon Airways 3–1 Fujieda City Hall S.C.
- Matsushita Electric 1–1 (PK 3–1) Toyota Motors
- Toshiba 0–1 Yamaha Motors
- Mitsubishi Motors 4–2 Sapporo University
- Waseda University 0–1 Yanmar Diesel
- Kokushikan University 0–0 (PK 5–3) Akita City Hall
- F.C. Ueda Gentian 1–7 Nippon Kokan

=== 2nd round ===
- Hyōgo Teachers 1–1 (PK 3–2) Osaka Gas
- Yomiuri 2–1 Yawata Steel
- Nissan Motors 2–0 Mazda
- Seino Transportation SC 0–2 Fujita Industries
- Honda 5–1 All Nippon Airways
- Matsushita Electric 0–2 Yamaha Motors
- Mitsubishi Motors 0–1 Yanmar Diesel
- Kokushikan University 1–6 Nippon Kokan

=== Quarterfinals ===
- Hyōgo Teachers 0–5 Yomiuri
- Nissan Motors 2–0 Fujita Industries
- Honda 2–2 (PK 2–4) Yamaha Motors
- Yanmar Diesel 0–3 Nippon Kokan

=== Semifinals ===
- Yomiuri 1–1 (PK 4–3) Nissan Motors
- Yamaha Motors 0–1 Nippon Kokan

=== Final ===
- Yomiuri 2–1 Nippon Kokan

Yomiuri won the championship Excluded from the Asian Cup Winners' Cup 1987.
