= Football at the 1988 Summer Olympics – Men's qualification =

The men's qualification for the 1988 Summer Olympics.

== Qualified teams ==
- Automatically qualified
  - South Korea (as hosts)
- Europe (UEFA)
  - Italy
  - Sweden
  - Soviet Union
  - West Germany
  - Yugoslavia
- Africa (CAF)
  - Nigeria
  - Tunisia
  - Zambia
- Asia (AFC)
  - China
  - Iraq
- North and Central America (CONCACAF)
  - Guatemala (replaces Mexico)
  - United States
- South America (CONMEBOL)
  - Argentina
  - Brazil
- Oceania (OFC)
  - Australia

== Qualifications ==
=== UEFA (Europe) ===
The European Qualifiers for the 1988 Summer Olympics tournament took place between 12 November 1986 and 31 May 1988. Italy, Sweden, Soviet Union, West Germany and Yugoslavia gained qualification to the Olympic tournament.

=== CONMEBOL (South America) ===
The South American Pre-Olympic tournament was held over a total of three groups from 18 April to 3 May 1987 in Bolivia, and saw Argentina and Brazil qualify.

=== CONCACAF (North, Central America and Caribbean) ===
The CONCACAF qualifying rounds and Pre-Olympic tournament was held from 25 January 1987 to 14 February 1988, and saw Mexico and United States qualify.

On 30 June 1988, FIFA banned Mexico from all competitions for two years due to the falsification of documents regarding the ages of players for the 1988 CONCACAF U-20 Tournament. FIFA confirmed on 5 July 1988 that Guatemala would replace Mexico in the final Olympic tournament in Seoul.

=== CAF (Africa) ===
The African Qualifiers tournament for the 1988 Summer Olympics took place over a total of four rounds between 16 November 1986 and 31 January 1988. After the fourth round, Nigeria, Tunisia and Zambia gained qualification to the Olympic tournament.

=== AFC (Asia) ===
The Pre-Olympic tournaments of the Asian Qualifiers for the 1988 Summer Olympic were held from 16 April 1987 to 26 October 1987. China PR and Iraq qualified, South Korea qualifying automatically as hosts.

=== OFC (Oceania) ===
The Oceanian qualifying rounds and Pre-Olympic tournament were held from 15 November 1987 to 27 March 1988. Australia qualify.
