= 1987 JSL Cup =

Tournament details
- Country: Japan

Final positions
- Champions: Nippon Kokan
- Runners-up: Sumitomo Metals
- Semifinalists: Honda; All Nippon Airways

Statistics of JSL Cup in the 1987 season.

== Overview ==
It was contested by 28 teams, and Nippon Kokan won the championship.

== Results ==
=== 1st round ===
- Fujitsu 2-0 Kawasaki Steel
- Mitsubishi Motors 1-1 (PK 4–3) Toyota Motors
- Toshiba 4-0 Kofu
- Yamaha Motors 3-0 Toho Titanium
- Nippon Kokan 4-0 Seino Transportations
- Fujita Industries 4-0 Tanabe Pharmaceuticals
- All Nippon Airways 3-2 NTT Kansai
- Matsushita Electric 3-0 Osaka Gas
- Yomiuri 1-3 Sumitomo Metals
- Mazda Auto Hiroshima 2-2 (PK 5–4) NTT Kanto
- Hitachi 3-0 Cosmo Oil

=== 2nd round ===
- Honda 3-1 Fujitsu
- Mitsubishi Motors 1-0 Mazda
- Toshiba 1-0 Yamaha Motors
- Nippon Kokan 1-1 (PK 5–4) Nissan Motors
- Furukawa Electric 1-0 Fujita Industries
- All Nippon Airways 1-0 Matsushita Electric
- Sumitomo Metals 7-1 Mazda Auto Hiroshima
- Hitachi 0-4 Yanmar Diesel

=== Quarterfinals ===
- Honda 3-0 Mitsubishi Motors
- Toshiba 0-3 Nippon Kokan
- Furukawa Electric 1-1 (PK 7–8) All Nippon Airways
- Sumitomo Metals 2-1 Yanmar Diesel

=== Semifinals ===
- Honda 0-3 Nippon Kokan
- All Nippon Airways 0-0 (PK 3–4) Sumitomo Metals

=== Final ===
- Nippon Kokan 3-1 Sumitomo Metals

Nippon Kokan won the championship
