= 1987–88 Japan Soccer League =

Japan Soccer League
- Season: 1987-88
- Teams: 12
- Champions: Yamaha Motors; 1st title
- Runner up: Nippon Kokan
- Matches: 132
- Goals: 238 (1.8 per match)
- Top goalscorer: Toshio Matsuura (11 goals)

Statistics of Japan Soccer League for the 1987–88 season.

== First Division ==
Pos	Team	Pld	W	D	L	GF	GA	GD	Pts	Qualification or relegation
1	Yamaha Motors	22	12	10	0	27	10	+17	34	1988–89 Asian Club Championship
2	Nippon Kokan	22	13	4	5	25	13	+12	30	
3	Mitsubishi Motors	22	12	5	5	27	15	+12	29	
4	Nissan	22	10	5	7	27	20	+7	25	
5	Yomiuri	22	8	8	6	23	17	+6	24	
6	Yanmar Diesel	22	7	10	5	22	19	+3	24	
7	Furukawa Electric	22	6	9	7	17	16	+1	21	
8	Honda	22	6	8	8	19	22	−3	20	
9	Fujita Engineering	22	6	6	10	16	20	−4	18	
10	Sumitomo	22	5	5	12	17	32	−15	15	
11	Mazda	22	2	9	11	8	18	−10	13	Relegated to Second Division
12	Toyota Motors	22	3	5	14	10	36	−26	11	Relegated to Second Division

Source: RSSSF

=== Topscorers ===
Rank	Player	Goals
1	(Japan) Toshio Matsuura (Nippon Kokan)	11
2	(Japan) Hiromi Hara (Mitsubishi Heavy Industries)	10
3	(Brazil) António Carlos André (Yamaha Motor) (Brazil) Jonas (Yanmar)	9
5	(Brazil) Wagner Lopes (Nissan Motors) (Brazil) Adílson (Yamaha Motor) (Japan) Kazuhiro Mogi (Sumitomo Metals)	8

== Second Division ==
=== First stage ===
==== East ====
Pos	Team	Pld	W	D	L	GF	GA	GD	Pts
1	Toshiba	14	8	4	2	20	5	+15	20
2	ANA Yokohama	14	7	6	1	26	13	+13	20
3	Hitachi	14	6	6	2	22	9	+13	18
4	NTT Kanto	14	5	7	2	20	12	+8	17
5	Fujitsu	14	5	4	5	17	13	+4	14
6	Toho Titanium	14	3	4	7	11	25	−14	10
7	Seino Transportation	14	3	1	10	7	25	−18	7
8	Kofu Club	14	1	4	9	8	29	−21	6

Source: RSSSF

==== West ====
Pos	Team	Pld	W	D	L	GF	GA	GD	Pts
1	Matsushita Electric	14	11	3	0	51	7	+44	25
2	Tanabe Pharmaceuticals	14	8	3	3	27	13	+14	19
3	Cosmo Oil	14	7	4	3	24	15	+9	18
4	Kawasaki Steel	14	6	2	6	21	19	+2	14
5	Osaka Gas	14	6	2	6	15	25	−10	14
6	Nippon Steel	14	4	3	7	15	28	−13	11
7	NTT Kansai	14	3	0	11	11	34	−23	6
8	Mazda Auto Hiroshima	14	2	1	11	8	31	−23	5

Source: RSSSF

=== Second stage ===
==== Promotion Group ====
Pos	Team	Pld	W	D	L	GF	GA	GD	Pts	Promotion
1	ANA	14	11	2	1	26	6	+20	24	Promoted to First Division
2	Matsushita Electric	14	9	2	3	24	8	+16	20	Promoted to First Division
3	Toshiba	14	8	2	4	15	8	+7	18	
4	Hitachi	14	6	3	5	11	12	−1	15	
5	NTT Kanto	14	4	6	4	8	9	−1	14	
6	Tanabe Pharmaceuticals	14	2	7	5	11	16	−5	11	
7	Cosmo Oil	14	2	1	11	7	21	−14	5	
8	Kawasaki Steel	14	1	3	10	8	30	−22	5	

Source: RSSSF

==== Relegation Group ====
===== East =====
Pos	Team	Pld	W	D	L	GF	GA	GD	Pts	Relegation
1	Fujitsu	6	4	0	2	25	17	+8	22	
2	Toho Titanium	6	2	0	4	17	33	−16	14	
3	Kofu Club	6	3	1	2	15	34	−19	13	
4	Seino Transportation	6	2	1	3	13	35	−22	12	Relegated to Regional Leagues

Source: RSSSF

===== West =====
Pos	Team	Pld	W	D	L	GF	GA	GD	Pts	Relegation
1	Nippon Steel	6	4	0	2	23	33	−10	19	
2	Osaka Gas	6	1	3	2	20	30	−10	19	
3	NTT Kansai	6	2	1	3	19	43	−24	11	
4	Mazda Auto Hiroshima	6	2	2	2	16	40	−24	11	Relegated to Regional Leagues

Source: RSSSF

===== 9th-16th Places Playoff =====
Pos	East	Score	West
9–10	Fujitsu	1-2	Nippon Steel
11–12	Toho Titanium	2-0	Osaka Gas
13–14	Kofu Club	0-0(PK4-1)	NTT Kansai
15–16	Seino Transportation	5-0	Mazda Auto Hiroshima
