= 1986–87 Japan Soccer League =

Japan Soccer League
- Season: 1986-87
- Teams: 12
- Champions: Yomiuri; 3rd title
- Runner up: Nippon Kokan
- Matches: 132
- Goals: 278 (2.11 per match)
- Top goalscorer: Toshio Matsuura (14 goals)

Statistics of Japan Soccer League for the 1986–87 season.

== First Division ==
Despite moving to Kashiwa, Chiba and a soccer-specific stadium of their own, Hitachi did not adjust well and were relegated in bottom place, the first drop for the former champions. Matsushita, despite having more victories than relegation rivals Yamaha, had more losses as well and thus joined Hitachi.

Pos	Team	Pld	W	D	L	GF	GA	GD	Pts	Qualification or relegation
1	Yomiuri	22	11	7	4	35	18	+17	29	1987 Asian Club Championship
2	Nippon Kokan	22	11	7	4	30	17	+13	29	
3	Mitsubishi Motors	22	9	10	3	23	14	+9	28	
4	Furukawa Electric	22	10	6	6	26	17	+9	26	
5	Nissan	22	10	4	8	35	24	+11	24	
6	Yanmar Diesel	22	8	8	6	21	22	−1	24	
7	Mazda	22	6	11	5	17	17	0	23	
8	Fujita Engineering	22	8	6	8	24	22	+2	22	
9	Honda	22	6	8	8	20	24	−4	20	
10	Yamaha Motors	22	3	11	8	11	22	−11	17	
11	Matsushita Electric	22	5	6	11	23	38	−15	16	Relegated to Second Division
12	Hitachi	22	1	4	17	13	43	−30	6	Relegated to Second Division

Source: RSSSF

== Second Division ==
Sumitomo returned to the top flight at the first time of asking, followed by Toyota Motors, who had been struggling since their 1977 relegation and came close to dropping out of the League. TDK and the Kyoto Police Dept. team went back to the regional divisions; TDK would not return to the second tier until 2021.

=== First stage ===
==== East ====
Pos	Team	Pld	W	D	L	GF	GA	GD	Pts
1	Toshiba	14	10	3	1	24	7	+17	23
2	Sumitomo	14	9	3	2	36	9	+27	21
3	Kofu Club	14	6	3	5	15	15	0	15
4	Cosmo Oil	14	5	4	5	17	15	+2	14
5	ANA Yokohama	14	4	5	5	20	18	+2	13
6	Fujitsu	14	6	1	7	16	20	−4	13
7	Toho Titanium	14	4	4	6	13	19	−6	12
8	TDK	14	0	1	13	8	46	−38	1

Source: RSSSF

==== West ====
Pos	Team	Pld	W	D	L	GF	GA	GD	Pts
1	Tanabe Pharmaceuticals	14	9	5	0	22	5	+17	23
2	Toyota Motors	14	9	2	3	33	15	+18	20
3	Osaka Gas	14	6	7	1	20	13	+7	19
4	Seino Transportation	14	7	2	5	14	12	+2	16
5	Nippon Steel	14	7	1	6	23	15	+8	15
6	Kyoto Prefectural Police	14	3	2	9	15	34	−19	8
7	Kawasaki Steel	14	2	2	10	16	30	−14	6
8	NTT Kansai	14	1	3	10	12	31	−19	5

Source: RSSSF

=== Second stage ===
==== Promotion Group ====
Pos	Team	Pld	W	D	L	GF	GA	GD	Pts	Promotion
1	Sumitomo	14	9	4	1	20	4	+16	22	Promoted to First Division
2	Toyota Motors	14	6	4	4	19	12	+7	16	Promoted to First Division
3	Tanabe Pharmaceuticals	14	3	8	3	11	9	+2	14	
4	Seino Transportation	14	4	6	4	9	11	−2	14	
5	Toshiba	14	4	5	5	12	11	+1	13	
6	Osaka Gas	14	5	2	7	12	20	−8	12	
7	Kofu Club	14	5	1	8	12	15	−3	11	
8	Cosmo Oil	14	3	4	7	8	21	−13	10	

Source: RSSSF

==== Relegation Group ====
===== East =====
Pos	Team	Pld	W	D	L	GF	GA	GD	Pts	Relegation
1	Fujitsu	6	5	1	0	21	6	+15	11	
2	ANA Yokohama	6	3	1	2	13	12	+1	7	
3	Toho Titanium	6	2	2	2	8	10	−2	6	
4	TDK	6	0	0	6	5	19	−14	0	Relegated to Regional Leagues

Source: RSSSF

===== West =====
Pos	Team	Pld	W	D	L	GF	GA	GD	Pts	Relegation
1	Nippon Steel	6	4	0	2	14	7	+7	8	
2	Kawasaki Steel	6	3	1	2	13	9	+4	7	
3	NTT Kansai	6	3	0	3	13	9	+4	6	
4	Kyoto Prefectural Police	6	1	1	4	5	20	−15	3	Relegated to Regional Leagues

Source: RSSSF

===== 9th-16th Place Playoff =====
Pos	East	Score	West
9–10	Fujitsu	3-3(PK4-2)	Nippon Steel
11–12	ANA Yokohama	4-2	Kawasaki Steel
13–14	Toho Titanium	3-0	NTT Kansai
15–16	TDK	5-0	Kyoto Prefectural Police
