= 1985–86 Japan Soccer League =

Japan Soccer League
- Season: 1985-86
- Teams: 12
- Champions: Furukawa Electric; 2nd title
- Runner up: Nippon Kokan
- Matches: 132
- Goals: 323 (2.45 per match)
- Top goalscorer: Hiroshi Yoshida (16 goals)

Statistics of Japan Soccer League for the 1985–86 season.

== First Division ==
Led by their star player Yasuhiko Okudera, who had returned to the club after successful periods in Europe, Furukawa Electric won their second title. Okudera became the first widely recognized professional Japanese player.

Sumitomo and ANA Yokohama were relegated after one season in the top division.

Pos	Team	Pld	W	D	L	GF	GA	GD	Pts	Qualification or relegation
1	Furukawa Electric	22	15	5	2	40	15	+25	35	1986 Asian Club Championship
2	Nippon Kokan	22	13	2	7	39	22	+17	28	
3	Honda	22	8	12	2	30	20	+10	28	
4	Fujita Engineering	22	9	8	5	31	17	+14	26	
5	Nissan	22	8	8	6	23	29	−6	24	
6	Yamaha Motors	22	9	5	8	20	21	−1	23	
7	Mitsubishi Motors	22	8	6	8	29	19	+10	22	
8	Hitachi	22	8	5	9	26	33	−7	21	
9	Yomiuri	22	7	5	10	28	31	−3	19	
10	Yanmar Diesel	22	6	6	10	20	27	−7	18	
11	Sumitomo	22	6	3	13	21	32	−11	15	Relegated to Second Division
12	ANA Yokohama	22	2	1	19	16	57	−41	5	Relegated to Second Division

Source: RSSSF

== Second Division ==
No relegation took place for a second wave of expansion that would bring the division's number of clubs to 16.

=== First stage ===
==== East ====
Pos	Team	Pld	W	D	L	GF	GA	GD	Pts
1	Toyota Motors	10	8	1	1	23	6	+17	17
2	Toshiba	10	6	1	3	12	7	+5	13
3	Kofu Club	10	5	0	5	22	16	+6	10
4	Fujitsu	10	4	2	4	16	12	+4	10
5	Seino Transportation	10	3	2	5	13	21	−8	8
6	TDK	10	0	2	8	10	34	−24	2

Source: RSSSF

==== West ====
Pos	Team	Pld	W	D	L	GF	GA	GD	Pts
1	Matsushita Electric	10	8	2	0	26	6	+20	18
2	Tanabe Pharmaceuticals	10	6	1	3	13	8	+5	13
3	Mazda	10	5	2	3	14	10	+4	12
4	Nippon Steel	10	5	1	4	18	9	+9	11
5	Kyoto Prefectural Police	10	2	0	8	3	28	−25	4
6	Osaka Gas	10	1	0	9	8	21	−13	2

Source: RSSSF

=== Second stage ===
==== Promotion Group ====
Pos	Team	Pld	W	D	L	GF	GA	GD	Pts	Promotion
1	Matsushita Electric	10	8	1	1	23	6	+17	17	Promoted to First Division
2	Mazda	10	6	1	3	12	7	+5	13	Promoted to First Division
3	Toshiba	10	5	0	5	22	16	+6	10	
4	Kofu Club	10	4	2	4	16	12	+4	10	
5	Tanabe Pharmaceuticals	10	3	2	5	13	21	−8	8	
6	Toyota Motors	10	0	2	8	10	34	−24	2	

Source: RSSSF

==== Relegation Group ====
===== East =====
Pos	Team	Pld	W	D	L	GF	GA	GD	Pts
1	Fujitsu	4	4	0	0	17	2	+15	8
2	Seino Transportation	4	1	1	2	5	8	−3	3
3	TDK	4	0	1	3	2	14	−12	1

Source: RSSSF

===== West =====
Pos	Team	Pld	W	D	L	GF	GA	GD	Pts
1	Nippon Steel	4	3	1	0	9	2	+7	7
2	Kyoto Prefectural Police	4	1	1	2	4	7	−3	3
3	Osaka Gas	4	1	0	3	6	10	−4	2

Source: RSSSF

===== 7-12 Playoff =====
Pos	East	Score	West
7–8	Fujitsu	0-1	Nippon Steel
9–10	Seino Transportation	1-0	Kyoto Prefectural Police
11–12	TDK	1-2	Osaka Gas
