= NKK SC =

NKK S.C.
- Full name: NKK Soccer Club (formerly Nippon Kokan S.C.)
- Nickname: Kokan
- Founded: 1932
- Dissolved: 1994
- Ground: Todoroki Athletics Stadium; Kawasaki, Kanagawa, Japan
- League: Former JFL Division 2
Home colours	Away colours

NKK Soccer Club (NKKサッカー部, Enu Kei Kei Sakka Bu, formerly Nippon Kokan Soccer Club (日本鋼管サッカー部, Nippon Kokan Sakka Bu)) was a Japanese football club which operated from 1932 to 1994. It played in the old Japan Soccer League from 1967 until its closing. It was affiliated with NKK, a steel company that today is part of the JFE Holdings conglomerate.

== History ==
The club was formed in 1932 although it did not start playing football until the mid-1930s. It played its matches at Todoroki Athletics Stadium in Kawasaki, Kanagawa and at Mitsuzawa Stadium in Yokohama. From 1985 to 1988 it was a regular contender for the JSL title, and was runners-up three times in a row.

NKK was the first club to win both the Emperor's Cup and promotion as second tier champions, achieved this in 1981. Yamaha Motor, now known as Júbilo Iwata, would follow the next year, and FC Tokyo would accomplish that as well in 2011.

When the J.League was formed in 1992, NKK decided not to turn professional and join the former Japan Football League. They were entered into the JFL's first division but were relegated at the end of the season.

With the presence of Verdy Kawasaki and the move of Toshiba's club north to become Consadole Sapporo, plus the rise of Fujitsu (which would later become Kawasaki Frontale), NKK decided to call it a day.

== League history ==
- 1967: Promoted to the Japan Soccer League
- 1979: Relegated to JSL Division 2
- 1981: JSL Division 2 champions
- 1982: Relegated to JSL Division 2
- 1983: JSL Division 2 champions
- 1985: JSL Division 1 runners-up
- 1986–87: JSL Division 1 runners-up
- 1987–88: JSL Division 1 runners-up
- 1990–91: Relegated to JSL Division 2
- 1992: League restructured. Joined Japan Football League Division 1. Relegated to JFL Division 2.
- 1993: JFL Division 2 third place. Folded.

== Honours ==
NKK SC honours
Honour	No.	Years
Shakaijin Cup	1	1965
JSL Cup	2	1980, 1987
Emperor's Cup	1	1981
Japan Soccer League Division 2	2	1981, 1983

== Other sports ==
- Volleyball — men's club was Japan National League champions multiple times in the 1960s.
- Baseball
- Basketball — NKK Sea Hawks
