= JSL Cup =

Original league cup for clubs in the top levels of Japanese football

JSL Cup (JSLカップ or JSLカップ選手権大会) was the original league cup for clubs in the Japan Soccer League, the top level of Japanese football before the creation of the J. League and its cup. The cup was first played in 1973, but only become an annual tournament in 1976.

The JSL Cup included clubs from both the First Division and the Second Division. The format varied; sometimes the clubs played small group stages, other times it was an outright elimination, including only the clubs that were not recent promotions to the Second Division. During the season timeframe change of 1985, the cup was played within the year, a rule that stayed until the advent of the J. League.

== Winners ==
Year	Winner	Score	Runner-up	Venue
1973	Towa Real Estate (shared)	1–1	Yanmar Diesel (shared)	Nishigaoka National Stadium, Tokyo
1976	Hitachi	1–0	Eidai	National Olympic Stadium, Tokyo
1977	Furukawa Electric	4–0	Yanmar Diesel	National Olympic Stadium, Tokyo
1978	Mitsubishi Motors	2–1	Fujita Industries	Kanko Stadium, Okayama
1979	Yomiuri	3–2	Furukawa Electric	Nagai Stadium, Osaka
1980	Nippon Kokan	3–1	Hitachi	Nagai Stadium, Osaka
1981	Mitsubishi Motors (shared)	4–4	Toshiba (shared)	Utsunomiya Soccer Field, Utsunomiya
1982	Furukawa Electric	3–2	Yanmar Diesel	Shizuoka Athletic Stadium, Shizuoka
1983	Yanmar Diesel	1–0	Nissan Motors	Kofu Midorigaoka Stadium, Kofu
1984	Yanmar Diesel	3–0	Toshiba	Komazawa Stadium, Tokyo
1985	Yomiuri	2–0	Nissan Motors	Toyohashi Soccer Stadium, Toyohashi
1986	Furukawa Electric	4–0	Nissan Motors	Mizuho Athletic Stadium, Nagoya
1987	Nippon Kokan	3–0	Sumitomo Metal	Mizuho Athletic Stadium, Nagoya
1988	Nissan Motors	3–0	Toshiba	Yokkaichi Stadium, Yokkaichi
1989	Nissan Motors	1–0	Yamaha Motors	Toyohashi Soccer Stadium, Toyohashi
1990	Nissan Motors	3–1	Furukawa Electric	Mizuho Athletic Stadium, Nagoya
1991	Yomiuri	4–3	Honda Motors	Mizuho Athletic Stadium, Nagoya

== Performances by team ==
Teams are named using current nomenclature, or last one if they are defunct (denoted in italics).

Club	Winners	Runners-up	Winning seasons	Runners-up seasons
Yokohama F. Marinos	3	3	1988, 1989, 1990	1983, 1985, 1986
JEF United Chiba	3	2	1977, 1982, 1986	1979, 1990
Cerezo Osaka	3	2	1973 (shared), 1983, 1984	1977, 1982
Tokyo Verdy	3	0	1979, 1985, 1991	
Urawa Red Diamonds	2	0	1978, 1981 (shared)	
NKK SC	2	0	1980, 1987	
Consadole Sapporo	1	2	1981 (shared)	1984, 1988
Shonan Bellmare	1	1	1973 (shared)	1978
Kashiwa Reysol	1	1	1976	1980
Eidai SC	0	1		1976
Kashima Antlers	0	1		1987
Júbilo Iwata	0	1		1989
Honda FC	0	1		1991

== Sources ==
- Contents of Domestic Competition of Football in Japan
- Japan – List of League Cup Winners, RSSSF.com
