= List of Asian Games medalists in football =

This is the complete list of Asian Games medalists in football from 1951 to 2022.

== Men ==
Games	Gold	Silver	Bronze
1951 New Delhi	India (IND); Berland Anthony; Syed Khwaja Azizuddin; A. M. Bachan; Sunil Chatterjee; Abhoy Ghosh; D. N. Devine Jones; Ahmed Khan; G. Y. S. Laiq; Sheikh Abdul Latif; Loganathan; Sailen Manna; Sheoo Mewalal; Santosh Nandy; Muhammad Noor; Chandan Singh Rawat; P. B. A. Saleh; Mohammad Abdus Sattar; T. Shanmugham; Runu Guha Thakurta; Kenchappa Varadaraj; Thenmaddom Varghese; Pansanttom Venkatesh	Iran (IRN); Nader Afshar Alavinejad; Nader Afshar Naderi; Amir Aghahosseini; Mohsen Azad; Mahmoud Bayati; Masoud Boroumand; Amir Eraghi; Hossein Fekri; Aref Gholizadeh; Mansour Hajian; Parviz Kouzehkanani; George Markarian; Mehdi Masoud-Ansari; Mehdi Nassiroghloo; Mahmoud Shakibi; Hossein Soroudi; Ghorban Ali Tari	Japan (JPN); Ko Arima; Toshio Iwatani; Taro Kagawa; Takashi Kano; Nobuyuki Kato; Seki Matsunaga; Koji Miyata; Hirokazu Ninomiya; Ken Noritake; Yoshio Okada; Shigeo Sugimoto; Megumu Tamura; Masanori Tokita; Yukio Tsuda
1954 Manila	Republic of China (ROC); Chan Fai-hung; Chou Wen-chi; Chu Chin-ching; Chu Wing-keung; Hau Ching-to; Hau Yung-sang; Ho Ying-fan; Hsu Wei-po; King Loh-sung; Lau Yee; Lee Tai-fai; Li Chun-fat; Lo Ching-hsiang; Mok Chun-wah; Ng Kee-cheung; Pau King-yin; Szeto Man; Tang Sum; Teng Sheung; Tse Tsu-kuo; Yen Shih-hsin; Yiu Cheuk-yin	South Korea (KOR); Choi Chung-min; Choi Kwang-seok; Chu Yung-kwang; Chung Kook-chin; Chung Nam-sik; Ham Heung-chul; Han Chang-wha; Hong Deok-young; Kang Chang-gi; Kim Ji-sung; Lee Sang-yi; Li Jong-kap; Min Byung-dae; Park Il-kap; Park Kyu-chung; Sung Nak-woon	Burma (BIR); Seaton Aukim; Ba Kyu; Perry Dwe; Gordon Samuel; Hla Maung; Htoowa Dwe; Kyaw Zaw; Pe Myint; Maung Aung; Sein Myint; Sein Pe; Douglas Steward; Thein Aung; Tin Kyi; Tun Aung; Robert Yin Gyaw; Suk Bahadur
1958 Tokyo	Republic of China (ROC); Chan Fai-hung; Chow Siu-hung; Ho Chi-kwan; Ho Ying-fan; Kwok Chow-ming; Kwok Kam-hung; Kwok Moon-wah; Kwok Yau; Lam Sheung-yee; Lau Kin-chung; Lau Sui-wah; Lau Tim; Lau Yee; Law Pak; Lee Kwok-wah; Lo Kwok Tai; Loh Kwok-leun; Mok Chun-wah; Tang Sum; Wong Chi-keung; Yeung Wai-too; Yiu Cheuk-yin	South Korea (KOR); Cha Tae-sung; Choi Chung-min; Choi Kwang-seok; Ham Heung-chul; Kim Chan-ki; Kim Dong-keun; Kim Hong-bok; Kim Jin-woo; Kim Ji-sung; Kim Sang-jin; Kim Young-il; Kim Young-jin; Lee Soo-nam; Moon Jung-sik; Park Kyung-ho; Sim Keun-taek; Sung Nak-woon; Woo Sang-kwon	Indonesia (INA); Bakir; Fattah Hidayat; Muhammad Ilyas; Kurnia; Kwee Kiat Sek; Mardjoso; Paidjo; Phwa Sian Liong; Ramang; Muhammad Rasjid; Saari; Maulwi Saelan; Rukma Sudjana; Wowo Sunaryo; Omo Suratmo; Suryadi; Tan Liong Houw; Thio Him Tjiang; Henky Timisela
1962 Jakarta	India (IND); D. M. K. Afzal; Tulsidas Balaram; P. K. Banerjee; Prodyut Burman; O. Chandrashekar; Ram Bahadur Chhetri; D. Ethiraj; Fortunato Franco; Arun Ghosh; Chuni Goswami; Yousuf Khan; Arumai Nayagam; Jarnail Singh; Trilok Singh; Prasanta Sinha; Peter Thangaraj	South Korea (KOR); Cha Tae-sung; Cha Yong-man; Cho Nam-soo; Cho Yoon-ok; Chung Soon-chun; Chung Yeong-hwan; Ham Heung-chul; Jang Ji-eon; Jang Suk-woo; Kim Chan-ki; Kim Doo-sun; Kim Duk-joong; Kim Hong-bok; Lee Hyun; Moon Jung-sik; Park Kyung-hwa; Park Seung-ok; Son Kyung-ho	Malaya (MAL); Kamaruddin Ahmad; Mahat Ambu; Boey Chong Liam; Roslan Buang; Richard Choe; Robert Choe; Edwin Dutton; Foo Fook Choon; Stanley Gabrielle; M. Govindarajoo; Tunku Ismail; Arthur Koh; Sexton Lourdes; Abdul Ghani Minhat; Ibrahim Mydin; Ahmad Nazari; Abdullah Nordin; I. J. Singh; Yee Seng Choy
1966 Bangkok	Burma (BIR); Ba Pu; Han Thein; Hla Htay; Hla Kyi; Hla Pe; Hla Shwe Kay; Khin Maung Lay; Kyaw Thaung; Maung Maung; Maung Maung Aye; Maung Tin Han; Ohn Pe; Soe Myint; Suk Bahadur; Than Lwin; Thein Aung; Tin Aung; Tin Aye; Win Kyi	Iran (IRN); Hamid Aminikhah; Mostafa Arab; Aziz Asli; Homayoun Behzadi; Akbar Eftekhari; Fariborz Esmaeili; Gholam Hossein Farzami; Parviz Ghelichkhani; Hassan Habibi; Goudarz Habibi; Ali Jabbari; Hamid Jasemian; Parviz Mirzahassan; Mohammad Ranjbar; Abdollah Saedi; Mehrab Shahrokhi; Hamid Shirzadegan; Jalal Talebi; Faramarz Zelli	Japan (JPN); Masahiro Hamazaki; Kazuo Imanishi; Shio Kada; Kunishige Kamamoto; Hisao Kami; Hiroshi Katayama; Takeo Kimura; Yasuyuki Kuwahara; Ikuo Matsumoto; Masakatsu Miyamoto; Teruki Miyamoto; Takaji Mori; Aritatsu Ogi; Ryuichi Sugiyama; Ryozo Suzuki; Masashi Watanabe; Shigeo Yaegashi; Yoshitada Yamaguchi; Kenzo Yokoyama
1970 Bangkok	South Korea (KOR); Choi Jae-mo; Choi Kil-soo; Choi Sang-chul; Chung Gang-ji; Chung Kyu-poong; Hong In-woong; Kim Chang-il; Kim Ho; Kim Jung-nam; Kim Ki-bok; Kim Ki-hyo; Lee Hoe-taik; Lee Se-yeon; Lim Guk-chan; Oh In-bok; Park Byung-joo; Park Lee-chun; Park Soo-duk; Park Soo-il; Seo Yoon-chan	Shared gold	India (IND); Altaf Ahmed; Amar Bahadur; Jerry Bassi; Subhash Bhowmick; Shiv Das; Sukalyan Ghosh Dastidar; Mohammed Habib; Bandya Kakade; Sudhir Karmakar; Abdul Latif; Syed Nayeemuddin; Doraiswamy Nataraj; Chandreshwar Prasad; Magan Singh Rajvi; Kalyan Saha; Kuppuswami Sampath; Surajit Sengupta; Ajaib Singh; Manjit Singh; Shyam Thapa
1970 Bangkok	Burma (BIR); Aung Kyi; Aye Maung I Aye Maung II; Aye Maung Gyi; Aye Maung Lay; Khin Maung Tint; Maung Hla Htay; Maung Maung Myint; Maung Maung Tin; Myo Win Nyunt; Pe Khin; Soe Paing; Suk Bahadur; Than Soe; Tin Aung; Tin Aung Moe; Tin Sein; Tin Win; Win Maung; Ye Nyunt	Shared gold	India (IND); Altaf Ahmed; Amar Bahadur; Jerry Bassi; Subhash Bhowmick; Shiv Das; Sukalyan Ghosh Dastidar; Mohammed Habib; Bandya Kakade; Sudhir Karmakar; Abdul Latif; Syed Nayeemuddin; Doraiswamy Nataraj; Chandreshwar Prasad; Magan Singh Rajvi; Kalyan Saha; Kuppuswami Sampath; Surajit Sengupta; Ajaib Singh; Manjit Singh; Shyam Thapa
1974 Tehran	Iran (IRN); Nasser Hejazi; Bahram Mavaddat; Mansour Rashidi; Jafar Kashani; Ebrahim Ashtiani; Mohsen Houshangi; Ezzat Janmaleki; Akbar Kargarjam; Masih Masihnia; Mahmoud Etemadi; Parviz Ghelichkhani; Ali Parvin; Ali Jabbari; Mohammad Sadeghi; Mohammad Dastjerdi; Hassan Roshan; Ghafour Jahani; Mohammad Reza Adelkhani; Gholam Hossein Mazloumi; Karo Haghverdian	Israel (ISR); Itzhak Vissoker; Meir Nimni; Zvi Rosen; Avraham Lev; Yeshaayahu Schwager; Menahem Bello; Yehoshua Feigenbaum; Itzhak Shum; Moshe Schweizer; Gidi Damti; Shalom Schwarz; Moshe Onana; Eli Leventhal; Yoel Massuari	Malaysia (MAL); R. Arumugam; Wong Hee Kok; Hanafiah Ali; Wong Kuw Fou; P. Umaparam; Mohamed Chandran; Soh Chin Aun; Shukor Salleh; Wan Zawawi; Ali Bakar; Mohammed Bakar; Syed Ahmad; Mokhtar Dahari; Harun Jusoh; Namat Abdullah; Santokh Singh
1978 Bangkok	South Korea (KOR); Kim Hwang-Ho; Hong Sung-Ho; Kim Ho-Gon; Cho Kwang-Rae; Hwang Jae-Man; Park Sung-Hwa; Shin Hyun-Ho; Cho Young-Jeung; Lee Young-Moo; Lee Gang-Jo; Cha Bum-Kun; Choi Jong-Duk; Huh Jung-Moo; Park Sang-In; Kim Sung-Nam; Kim Gang-Nam; Oh Seok-Jae; Kim Hee-Chun; Kim Hee-Tae; Cho Byung-Deuk	Shared gold	China (CHN); Li Fusheng; He Jia; Lin Lefeng; Liu Zhicai; Xiang Hengqing; Yang Anli; Wang Feng; Chi Shangbin; Rong Zhixing; Li Fubao; Yang Yumin; Shen Xiangfu; Liu Jinshan; Liu Lifu; Wang Changtai
1978 Bangkok	North Korea (PRK); An Chang-nam; An Se-uk; Cha Jong-sok; Hong Song-nam; Hwang Sang-hoi; Jon Gwang-hwan; Kim Bok-man; Kim Gang-il; Kim In-chan; Kim Jong-min; Kim Mu-gil; Kim Mun-chol; Myong Dong-chan; Pak Jong-hun; Pak Kyong-won; Ri Chang-ha; Ri Sung-gil; Ri Sung-gun	Shared gold	China (CHN); Li Fusheng; He Jia; Lin Lefeng; Liu Zhicai; Xiang Hengqing; Yang Anli; Wang Feng; Chi Shangbin; Rong Zhixing; Li Fubao; Yang Yumin; Shen Xiangfu; Liu Jinshan; Liu Lifu; Wang Changtai
1982 New Delhi	Iraq (IRQ); Mehdi Abdul-Sahib; Hassan Ali; Karim Allawi; Khalil Allawi; Wathiq Aswad; Faisal Aziz; Adnan Dirjal; Raad Hammoudi; Natik Hashim; Ali Hussein; Sadiq Jabir; Emad Jassim; Saad Jassim; Haris Mohammed; Osama Noori; Ayoub Odisho; Ahmed Radhi; Hussein Saeed	Kuwait (KUW); Ahmad Al-Tarabulsi; Naeem Saad; Mahboub Juma'a; Jamal Al-Qabendi; Waleed Al-Jasem; Fathi Kameel; Abdullah Al-Buloushi; Abdulaziz Al-Anberi; Nassir Al-Ghanim; Yussef Al-Suwayed; Mubarak Marzouq; Muayad Al-Haddad; Anbar Saeed; Hamoud Al-Shemmari; Mohammad Karam; Abdulaziz Al-Buloushi; Adam Marjan; Jasem Bahman	Saudi Arabia (SAU); Khalid Al-Dosari; Hussein Al-Bishi; Nawaf Khamis; Sameer Abdulshaker; Saleh Nu'eimeh; Othman Marzouq; Saleh Khalifa; Abdulrahman Al-Qahtani; Majed Abdullah; Fahad Al-Musaibeah; Adel Abdulrahim; Jamal Farhan; Ahmed Bayazid; Shaye Al-Nafisah; Amin Dabo; Hamed Subhi; Mohammed Al-Mutlaq; Abdullah Al-Deayea
1986 Seoul	South Korea (KOR); Byun Byung-joo; Cho Byung-deuk; Cho Kwang-rae; Cho Min-kook; Cho Young-jeung; Choi Soon-ho; Chung Jong-soo; Chung Yong-hwan; Huh Jung-moo; Kang Deuk-soo; Kim Joo-sung; Kim Pyung-seok; Kim Sam-soo; Kim Yong-se; Lee Moon-young; Lee Tae-ho; Noh Soo-jin; Park Chang-sun; Park Kyung-hoon; Yoo Byung-ok	Saudi Arabia (SAU); Mohammed Abduljawad; Majed Abdullah; Bassem Abu-Dawood; Fahad Al-Bishi; Hussein Al-Bishi; Saad Al-Dosari; Abdullah Al-Hathloul; Mohaisen Al-Jam'an; Fahad Al-Musaibeah; Abdulrahman Al-Roomi; Mohammed Al-Shehrani; Abdulrahman Al-Tekhaifi; Yousuf Al-Thunayan; Ismail Hakami; Saleh Khalifa; Salem Marwan; Abdullah Masood; Saleh Nu'eimeh; Samir Sulaimani	Kuwait (KUW); Adel Abbas; Abdulaziz Al-Buloushi; Nassir Al-Ghanim; Muayad Al-Haddad; Abdulaziz Al-Hajeri; Salah Al-Hasawi; Waleed Al-Jasem; Jamal Al-Qabendi; Khalid Al-Sharidah; Hamoud Al-Shemmari; Khaled Al-Shemmari; Yussef Al-Suwayed; Jabir Al-Zanki; Naeem Saad; Wael Sulaiman
1990 Beijing	Iran (IRN); Ahmad Reza Abedzadeh; Javad Zarincheh; Mojtaba Moharrami; Mehdi Fonounizadeh; Mohammad Panjali; Sirous Ghayeghran; Morteza Kermani Moghaddam; Shahrokh Bayani; Mehdi Abtahi; Samad Marfavi; Nasser Mohammadkhani; Shahin Bayani; Mohsen Ashouri; Reza Hassanzadeh; Nader Mohammadkhani; Ali Eftekhari; Farshad Pious; Majid Namjoo-Motlagh; Mohammad Hassan Ansarifard; Behzad Gholampour	North Korea (PRK); Kim Chi-won; Kim Kwang-min; O Yong-nam; Kim Kyong-il; Jong Yong-man; Kim Jong-man; Han Hyong-il; Yun Chol; Yun Jong-su; Kim Yun-chol; Ri Jong-man; Tak Yong-bin; Kim Yong-nam; Jo In-chol; Choi Yong-son; Ryu Song-gun; Pang Gwang-chol; Kim Chung; Kim Jong-song; Kim Pung-il	South Korea (KOR); Choi In-young; Park Kyung-hoon; Chung Jong-soo; Yoon Deok-yeo; Chung Yong-hwan; Kim Sang-ho; Lee Young-jin; Kim Pan-keun; Hwangbo Kwan; Kim Joo-sung; Byun Byung-joo; Noh Jung-yoon; Jung Kwang-seok; Choi Soon-ho; Kim Poong-joo; Ko Jeong-woon; Gu Sang-bum; Hwang Sun-hong; Seo Jung-won; Hong Myung-bo
1994 Hiroshima	Uzbekistan (UZB); Yuriy Sheykin; Fevzi Davletov; Andrei Fyodorov; Mirjalol Qosimov; Farkhad Magametov; Ilkhom Sharipov; Abdukahhor Marifaliev; Sergey Lebedev; Igor Shkvyrin; Azamat Abduraimov; Shukhrat Maqsudov; Rustam Durmonov; Abdusamat Durmonov; Ulugbek Ruzimov; Stepan Atayan; Berdakh Allaniyazov; Aleksandr Tikhonov	China (CHN); Xu Tao; Wei Kexing; Jiang Feng; Fan Zhiyi; Xu Hong; Li Bing; Wang Dongning; Gao Zhongxun; Wang Tao; Gao Feng; Xie Yuxin; Li Ming; Hu Zhijun; Li Xiao; Jin Guangzhu; Peng Weiguo; Cao Xiandong; Ou Chuliang	Kuwait (KUW); Hussain Al-Mekaimi; Ali Falah Sadoun; Khaled Jarallah; Yousef Al-Dokhi; Mohammad Al-Adwani; Wael Sulaiman; Naser Al-Sohi; Obaid Al-Shammari; Ali Marwi; Nawaf Jadid Al-Enezi; Bashir Salboukh; Fawaz Al-Ahmad; Abdullah Al-Dousari; Mohammad Edailem; Nawaf Al-Dhafairi; Ayman Al-Hussaini; Salamah Al-Enezi; Mansour Basha; Falah Al-Majidi; Khaled Al-Fadhli
1998 Bangkok	Iran (IRI); Behzad Gholampour; Mehdi Mahdavikia; Javad Zarincheh; Mohammad Khakpour; Nader Mohammadkhani; Karim Bagheri; Alireza Mansourian; Sattar Hamedani; Hamid Estili; Ali Daei; Ali Mousavi; Dariush Yazdani; Ali Janmaleki; Mohammad Navazi; Vahid Hashemian; Ali Karimi; Rasoul Khatibi; Mahmoud Fekri; Nima Nakisa; Hamid Reza Babaei	Kuwait (KUW); Khaled Al-Fadhli; Naser Al-Omran; Jamal Mubarak; Ali Abdulreda Asel; Nohair Al-Shammari; Hussain Al-Khodari; Bader Haji; Mohammad Al-Buraiki; Ayman Al-Hussaini; Hani Al-Saqer; Faraj Laheeb; Nawaf Al-Khaldi; Ahmad Al-Mutairi; Khaled Abdulqoddus; Saleh Al-Buraiki; Mohammad Jasem; Esam Sakeen; Naser Al-Othman; Jasem Al-Huwaidi; Ahmad Al-Jasem	China (CHN); Jiang Jin; Ma Yongkang; Zhang Enhua; Sun Jihai; Fan Zhiyi; Li Tie; Zhao Junzhe; Ma Mingyu; Hao Haidong; Yang Chen; Bian Jun; Sui Dongliang; Wang Peng; Shu Chang; Huang Yong; Yao Xia; Li Weifeng; Li Jinyu; Chen Dong; Chi Rongliang
2002 Busan	Iran (IRI); Ebrahim Mirzapour; Mehdi Amirabadi; Yahya Golmohammadi; Saeid Lotfi; Javad Nekounam; Iman Mobali; Javad Kazemian; Ali Daei; Alireza Vahedi Nikbakht; Mehdi Rahmati; Hossein Kaebi; Moharram Navidkia; Abolfazl Hajizadeh; Mohsen Bayatinia; Ali Badavi; Siavash Akbarpour; Jalal Kameli Mofrad; Mohammad Nosrati; Hamid Azizzadeh; Ershad Yousefi	Japan (JPN); Yosuke Fujigaya; Teruyuki Moniwa; Shohei Ikeda; Daisuke Nasu; Yuichi Komano; Yuki Abe; Yoshito Okubo; Kazuyuki Morisaki; Daisuke Matsui; Ryoichi Maeda; Tatsuya Tanaka; Yuichi Nemoto; Keita Suzuki; Naohiro Ishikawa; Hikaru Mita; Takuya Nozawa; Hayuma Tanaka; Takaya Kurokawa; Satoshi Nakayama; Takeshi Aoki	South Korea (KOR); Lee Woon-jae; Cho Byung-kuk; Hyun Young-min; Park Yo-seb; Kim Young-chul; Park Yong-ho; Byun Sung-hwan; Kim Do-heon; Lee Chun-soo; Park Ji-sung; Choi Tae-uk; Lee Young-pyo; Kim Dong-jin; Park Kyu-seon; Cho Sung-hwan; Kim Yong-dae; Choi Sung-kuk; Kim Eun-jung; Park Dong-hyuk; Lee Dong-gook
2006 Doha	Qatar (QAT); Mohamed Saqr; Abdulrahman Mesbeh; Abdulla Al-Berik; Majdi Siddiq; Ali Nasser; Mesaad Al-Hamad; Hussein Yasser; Magid Mohamed; Ibrahim Al-Ghanim; Talal Al-Bloushi; Adel Lami; Wesam Rizik; Waleed Jassem; Yusef Ahmed; Abdulla Koni; Qasem Burhan; Sebastián Soria; Khalfan Ibrahim; Younes Ali; Bilal Mohammed	Iraq (IRQ); Mohammed Noor Al-Deen; Mohammed Ali; Haidar Raheem; Mustafa Karim; Samer Saeed; Ali Mansour; Younis Mahmoud; Jassim Mohammed; Haidar Sabah; Ali Rehema; Ali Khudhair; Alaa Abdul-Zahra; Karrar Jassim; Salam Shaker; Haidar Aboodi; Mohammed Gassid; Ahmed Abid Ali; Muayad Khalid; Osama Ali; Ahmed Jabbar	Iran (IRI); Alireza Haghighi; Mohsen Arzani; Jalal Akbari; Jalal Hosseini; Pejman Montazeri; Behshad Yavarzadeh; Milad Nouri; Maziar Zare; Mehrdad Oladi; Arash Borhani; Mohammad Gholamin; Sheys Rezaei; Saeid Chahjouei; Hossein Mahini; Mohammad Nouri; Khosro Heidari; Ehsan Khorsandi; Adel Kolahkaj; Mehrdad Pouladi; Hassan Roudbarian
2010 Guangzhou	Japan (JPN); Takuya Masuda; Yuki Saneto; Jun Sonoda; Takefumi Toma; Yusuke Higa; Shoma Kamata; Ryohei Yamazaki; Kazuya Yamamura; Masato Kurogi; Kota Mizunuma; Kensuke Nagai; Shunya Suganuma; Daisuke Suzuki; Shohei Otsuka; Keigo Higashi; Hotaru Yamaguchi; Kyohei Noborizato; Shunsuke Ando; Masato Kudo; Takamitsu Tomiyama	United Arab Emirates (UAE); Ali Khasif; Saad Surour; Abdullah Mousa; Amer Abdulrahman; Ali Al-Amri; Mohamed Al-Shehhi; Hamdan Al-Kamali; Ahmed Ali; Theyab Awana; Ahmed Khalil; Abdelaziz Sanqour; Saeed Al-Kathiri; Adel Al-Hosani; Mohamed Fawzi; Mohamed Ahmed; Abdulaziz Haikal; Ahmed Mahmoud; Mohammed Jamal; Haboush Saleh; Omar Abdulrahman	South Korea (KOR); Kim Seung-gyu; Hong Chul; Shin Kwang-hoon; Kim Ju-young; Kim Young-gwon; Hong Jeong-ho; Koo Ja-cheol; Yoon Bit-garam; Park Hee-seong; Park Chu-young; Cho Young-cheol; Kim Min-woo; Jang Suk-won; Kim Jung-woo; Oh Jae-suk; Seo Jung-jin; Yun Suk-young; Ji Dong-won; Kim Bo-kyung; Lee Bum-young
2014 Incheon	South Korea (KOR); Kim Seung-gyu; Choi Sung-keun; Kim Jin-su; Kim Min-hyeok; Lee Joo-young; Son Jun-ho; An Yong-woo; Park Joo-ho; Lee Yong-jae; Kim Seung-dae; Yun Il-lok; No Dong-geon; Kwak Hae-seong; Kim Young-uk; Rim Chang-woo; Lee Jong-ho; Lee Jae-sung; Kim Shin-wook; Moon Sang-yun; Jang Hyun-soo	North Korea (PRK); Ri Myong-guk; Jong Kwang-sok; Jang Song-hyok; Kim Chol-bom; Jang Kuk-chol; Kang Kuk-chol; Jo Kwang; Ju Jong-chol; Rim Kwang-hyok; Kim Ju-song; Jong Il-gwan; Ri Yong-jik; Sim Hyon-jin; Yun Il-gwang; Ri Hyok-chol; Kim Yong-il; So Hyon-uk; An Tae-song; Pak Kwang-ryong; So Kyong-jin	Iraq (IRQ); Ali Yasin; Mahdi Karim; Ali Bahjat; Mustafa Nadhim; Saad Natiq; Ali Adnan; Saad Abdul-Amir; Saif Salman; Dhurgham Ismail; Younis Mahmoud; Humam Tariq; Jalal Hassan; Sameh Saeed; Amjad Kalaf; Salam Shaker; Marwan Hussein; Farhan Shakor; Bashar Resan; Mahdi Kamil; Mohammed Hameed
2018 Jakarta–Palembang	South Korea (KOR); Song Bum-keun; Hwang Hyun-soo; Kim Min-jae; Kim Jin-ya; Jeong Tae-wook; Kim Moon-hwan; Son Heung-min; Lee Jin-hyun; Hwang Hee-chan; Hwang In-beom; Na Sang-ho; Lee Si-young; Cho Yu-min; Jang Yun-ho; Lee Seung-mo; Hwang Ui-jo; Lee Seung-woo; Jo Hyeon-woo; Kim Geon-ung; Kim Jung-min	Japan (JPN); Ryosuke Kojima; Yoichi Naganuma; Makoto Okazaki; Ko Itakura; Daiki Sugioka; Ryo Hatsuse; Teruki Hara; Kaoru Mitoma; Reo Hatate; Koji Miyoshi; Keita Endo; Powell Obinna Obi; Yuto Iwasaki; Taishi Matsumoto; Ayase Ueda; Kota Watanabe; Yuta Kamiya; Daizen Maeda; Takuma Ominami; Yugo Tatsuta	United Arab Emirates (UAE); Sultan Al-Mantheri; Abdullah Hassan Al-Noubi; Ahmed Rashed; Salem Sultan; Ismael Khaled; Majed Suroor; Ahmed Al-Attas; Jassem Yaqoub; Khaled Ibrahim; Ali Eid; Abdulrahman Al-Ameri; Abdullah Ghanem; Mohammed Al-Attas; Hussain Abdullah; Mohamed Al-Shamsi; Hamad Jassim; Mohammed Khalfan; Shahin Suroor; Zayed Al-Ameri; Rashed Mohammed
2022 Hangzhou	South Korea (KOR); Lee Gwang-yeon; Hwang Jae-won; Choi Jun; Park Jin-seop; Lee Jae-ik; Hong Hyun-seok; Jeong Woo-yeong; Paik Seung-ho; Park Jae-yong; Cho Young-wook; Um Won-sang; Min Seong-jun; Goh Young-joon; Lee Han-beom; Jeong Ho-yeon; Kim Tae-hyeon; Song Min-kyu; Lee Kang-in; Seol Young-woo; An Jae-jun; Kim Jeong-hoon; Park Kyu-hyun	Japan (JPN); Kazuki Fujita; Hayato Okuda; Manato Yoshida; Taichi Yamasaki; Seiya Baba; Daiki Matsuoka; Ibuki Konno; Masato Shigemi; Shun Ayukawa; Jun Nishikawa; Yuta Matsumura; Yuma Obata; Kein Sato; Yota Komi; Teppei Yachida; Kakeru Yamauchi; Shota Hino; Taiki Yamada; Kotaro Uchino; Koshiro Sumi; Kenta Nemoto; Hiroki Sekine	Uzbekistan (UZB); Otabek Boymurodov; Saidazamat Mirsaidov; Makhmud Makhamadzhonov; Shokhzhakhon Sultonmurodov; Mukhammadkodir Khamraliev; Bekhzod Shamsiev; Khojimat Erkinov; Ibrokhim Ibrokhimov; Ulugbek Khoshimov; Jasurbek Jaloliddinov; Otabek Jurakuziev; Vladimir Nazarov; Eldorbek Begimov; Ibrokhimkhalil Yuldoshev; Sherzod Esanov; Asadbek Rakhimzhonov; Diyor Kholmatov; Alibek Davronov; Khusayin Norchaev; Ruslanbek Jiyanov; Khamidullo Abdunabiev; Alisher Odilov

== Women ==
Games	Gold	Silver	Bronze
1990 Beijing	China (CHN); Chen Xia; Gu Pingjuan; Li Sa; Li Xiufu; Liu Ailing; Ma Li; Niu Lijie; Sun Qingmei; Tang Kunyuan; Wei Haiying; Wen Lirong; Wu Weiying; Zhang Yan; Zheng Maomei; Zhong Honglian; Zhou Hua; Zhou Yang; Zhu Tao	Japan (JPN); Etsuko Handa; Kazuko Hironaka; Midori Honda; Mayumi Kaji; Futaba Kioka; Kyoko Kuroda; Michiko Matsuda; Tomoko Matsunaga; Yuriko Mizuma; Kaori Nagamine; Akemi Noda; Megumi Sakata; Masae Suzuki; Yoko Takahagi; Asako Takakura; Takako Tezuka; Yumi Watanabe; Sayuri Yamaguchi	North Korea (PRK); Hong Kum-suk; Im Hyon-suk; Ju Jong-ae; Kim Gwang-suk; Kim Hye-ran; Kim Kum-sil; Kim Myong-suk; Kim Tak-sun; Pak Un-suk; Ri Ae-gyong; Ri Chu-wol; Ri Hong-sil; Ri Kyong-ae; Rim Sun-bong; Sin Yong-suk; Suk Yu-ran; Yang Mi-sun
1994 Hiroshima	China (CHN); Cao Yao; Chen Yufeng; Fan Yunjie; Gu Pingjuan; Liu Ailing; Niu Lijie; Shi Guihong; Shui Qingxia; Sun Qingmei; Sun Wen; Wang Liping; Wei Haiying; Wen Lirong; Yu Hongqi; Zhao Lihong; Zhong Honglian; Zhou Hua; Zhou Yang	Japan (JPN); Etsuko Handa; Maki Haneta; Kaoru Kadohara; Futaba Kioka; Kyoko Kuroda; Tsuru Morimoto; Terumi Nagae; Kaori Nagamine; Akemi Noda; Shiho Onodera; Nami Otake; Junko Ozawa; Homare Sawa; Asako Takakura; Inesu Emiko Takeoka; Yumi Tomei; Tamaki Uchiyama; Rie Yamaki	Chinese Taipei (TPE); Chang Hsiu-ling; Chen Chu-chi; Chen Shu-chin; Chou Tai-ying; Hsu Chia-cheng; Hsu Ching-hsin; Huang Yu-chuan; Hung Mei-hsiu; Ko Chiao-lin; Lan Lan-fen; Lee Mei-chin; Lin Hui-fang; Lin Mei-chun; Lin Mei-jih; Shieh Su-jean; Wu Huey-shwu; Wu Min-hsun; Yeh Huei-chen
1998 Bangkok	China (CHN); Bai Jie; Fan Yunjie; Gao Hong; Jin Yan; Liu Ailing; Liu Ying; Man Yanling; Qiu Haiyan; Shui Qingxia; Sun Qimin; Sun Wen; Wang Jingxia; Wang Liping; Wen Lirong; Xie Huilin; Zhang Ouying; Zhao Lihong; Zhao Yan	North Korea (PRK); Jin Pyol-hui; Jo Jong-ran; Jo Song-ok; Kim Hye-ran; Kim Kum-sil; Kim Song-ryo; Kim Sun-hui; Kim Sun-hye; Kye Yong-sun; Pak Jong-ae; Ri Ae-gyong; Ri Hyang-ok; Ri Jong-hui; Ri Kum-suk; Ri Kyong-ae; Sol Yong-suk; Yang Kyong-hui; Yun In-sil	Japan (JPN); Mito Isaka; Hiromi Isozaki; Kazumi Kishi; Tomomi Mitsui; Mai Nakachi; Kae Nishina; Yumi Obe; Shiho Onodera; Nami Otake; Tomoe Sakai; Homare Sawa; Miki Sugawara; Yumi Tomei; Tamaki Uchiyama; Yasuyo Yamagishi; Nozomi Yamago; Rie Yamaki; Miyuki Yanagita
2002 Busan	North Korea (PRK); Ri Jong-hui; Yun In-sil; Jo Song-ok; Sin Kum-ok; Ra Mi-ae; Ri Kum-suk; Pak Kum-chun; Ho Sun-hui; Jin Pyol-hui; Yun Yong-hui; Jang Ok-gyong; Song Jong-sun; O Kum-ran; Ri Un-gyong; Yang Kyong-hui; Chon Kyong-hwa; Ri Hyang-ok; Kim Un-ok	China (CHN); Xiao Zhen; Sun Rui; Li Jie; Gao Hongxia; Fan Yunjie; Zhao Lihong; Pu Wei; Bai Lili; Bai Jie; Sun Wen; Xie Caixia; Zhou Xiaoxia; Meng Jun; Bi Yan; Ren Liping; Liu Yali; Pan Lina; Zhao Yan	Japan (JPN); Nozomi Yamago; Yuka Miyazaki; Yoshie Kasajima; Yasuyo Yamagishi; Tomoe Sakai; Yumi Obe; Yayoi Kobayashi; Mai Nakachi; Tomomi Miyamoto; Homare Sawa; Mio Otani; Mai Aizawa; Kanako Ito; Mito Isaka; Naoko Kawakami; Miyuki Yanagita; Karina Maruyama; Miho Fukumoto
2006 Doha	North Korea (PRK); Phi Un-hui; Jang Ok-gyong; Om Jong-ran; Sonu Kyong-sun; Song Jong-sun; Ri Un-suk; Kim Yong-ae; Ri Un-gyong; Ho Sun-hui; Kim Hye-yong; Kim Tan-sil; Kong Hye-ok; Ri Kum-suk; Jong Pok-sim; Ri Un-hyang; Jon Myong-hui; Kim Kyong-hwa; Kil Son-hui	Japan (JPN); Nozomi Yamago; Hiromi Isozaki; Aya Shimokozuru; Akiko Sudo; Kyoko Yano; Tomoe Sakai; Kozue Ando; Miyuki Yanagita; Eriko Arakawa; Homare Sawa; Miho Fukumoto; Maiko Nakaoka; Azusa Iwashimizu; Karina Maruyama; Aya Miyama; Shinobu Ono; Yuki Nagasato; Mizuho Sakaguchi	China (CHN); Han Wenxia; Liu Huana; Li Jie; Weng Xinzhi; Pu Wei; Yuan Fan; Bi Yan; Yue Min; Han Duan; Ma Xiaoxu; Zhang Tong; Wang Dandan; Wang Kun; Ren Liping; Liu Yali; Pan Lina; Zhang Yanru; Qu Feifei
2010 Guangzhou	Japan (JPN); Nozomi Yamago; Azusa Iwashimizu; Kyoko Yano; Yukari Kinga; Aya Sameshima; Mizuho Sakaguchi; Megumi Kamionobe; Aya Miyama; Ayako Kitamoto; Homare Sawa; Shinobu Ono; Ayumi Kaihori; Saki Kumagai; Mami Yamaguchi; Kana Osafune; Nahomi Kawasumi; Manami Nakano; Megumi Takase	North Korea (PRK); Hong Myong-hui; Kim Kyong-hwa; Choe Yong-sim; Song Jong-sun; Ro Chol-ok; Ho Un-byol; Jo Yun-mi; Ri Ye-gyong; Kim Yong-ae; Ra Un-sim; Ri Un-gyong; Kim Chung-sim; Yun Hyon-hi; Yu Jong-hui; Jon Myong-hwa; Jo Yun-mi; Jong Pok-sim; Kong Hye-ok	South Korea (KOR); Jun Min-kyung; Shim Seo-yeon; Lee Eun-mi; Kim Do-yeon; Hong Kyung-suk; Yu Ji-eun; Kwon Hah-nul; Park Eun-jung; Park Hee-young; Ji So-yun; Kim Soo-yun; Moon So-ri; Jeon Ga-eul; Kwon Eun-som; Kim Na-rae; Yoo Young-a; Cha Yun-hee; Kim Hye-ri
2014 Incheon	North Korea (PRK); Hong Myong-hui; Yun Song-mi; Ho Un-byol; Choe Mi-gyong; Ri Un-yong; Kim Un-hyang; Kim Su-gyong; Kim Un-ju; Jong Yu-ri; Ra Un-sim; Ri Ye-gyong; Kim Yun-mi; Wi Jong-sim; Jon Myong-hwa; Kim Nam-hui; Kim Un-ha; Jo Yun-mi; Ra Sol-ju	Japan (JPN); Ayumi Kaihori; Saori Ariyoshi; Azusa Iwashimizu; Kana Kitahara; Kana Osafune; Mizuho Sakaguchi; Emi Nakajima; Aya Miyama; Nahomi Kawasumi; Megumi Takase; Chinatsu Kira; Rika Masuya; Yuika Sugasawa; Nanase Kiryu; Rie Usui; Hisui Haza; Hikaru Naomoto; Erina Yamane	South Korea (KOR); Jun Min-kyung; Song Su-ran; Kim Hye-ri; Shim Seo-yeon; Kim Do-yeon; Lim Seon-joo; Jeon Ga-eul; Cho So-hyun; Jung Seol-bin; Ji So-yun; Park Hee-young; Yoo Young-a; Kwon Hah-nul; Lee So-dam; Choe Yu-ri; Lee Young-ju; Shin Dam-yeong; Kim Jung-mi
2018 Jakarta–Palembang	Japan (JPN); Sakiko Ikeda; Risa Shimizu; Aya Sameshima; Shiori Miyake; Hikari Takagi; Saori Ariyoshi; Emi Nakajima; Mana Iwabuchi; Yuika Sugasawa; Yuka Momiki; Mina Tanaka; Rika Masuya; Yu Nakasato; Yui Hasegawa; Moeno Sakaguchi; Rin Sumida; Aimi Kunitake; Ayaka Yamashita	China (CHN); Zhao Lina; Han Peng; Huang Yini; Lou Jiahui; Wu Haiyan; Lin Yuping; Wang Shuang; Li Jiayue; Ren Guixin; Li Ying; Wang Shanshan; Wang Yan; Li Tingting; Zhao Rong; Xiao Yuyi; Yang Lina; Gu Yasha; Li Mengwen; Bi Xiaolin; Zhang Rui	South Korea (KOR); Yoon Young-geul; Jang Sel-gi; Shin Dam-yeong; Shim Seo-yeon; Hong Hye-ji; Lim Seon-joo; Lee Min-a; Cho So-hyun; Jeon Ga-eul; Ji So-yun; Lee Geum-min; Moon Mi-ra; Han Chae-rin; Choe Yu-ri; Jang Chang; Son Hwa-yeon; Lee Hyun-young; Jung Bo-ram; Lee Eun-mi; Kim Hye-ri
2022 Hangzhou	Japan (JPN); Natsumi Asano; Shinomi Koyama; Haruna Tabata; Wakaba Goto; Reina Wakisaka; Rio Sasaki; Yuzuki Yamamoto; Chihiro Ishida; Mami Ueno; Yuzuho Shiokoshi; Yoshino Nakashima; Shu Ohba; Mei Shimada; Momoko Tanikawa; Remina Chiba; Suzu Amano; Toko Koga; Mamiko Matsumoto; Maya Hijikata; Haruka Osawa; Kotono Sakakibara	North Korea (PRK); Kim Un-hui; Yu Son-gum; Pak Ju-mi; Ri Myong-gum; Ri Kum-hyang; Pong Song-ae; Pak Sin-Jong; Son Ok-ju; Ri Pom-Hyang; Ri Hye-gyong; Myong Yu-jong; Ri Su-jong; Ju Hyo-sim; Choe Kum-ok; Kim Chungmi; Wi Jong-sim; Kim Hye-yong; Sung Hyang-sim; Ri Hak; An Myong-song; Hong Song-ok; Kim Kyong-yong	China (CHN); Zhu Yu; Li Mengwen; Dou Jiaxing; Wang Linlin; Liu Yanqiu; Zhang Xin; Wang Shuang; Yao Wei; Shen Mengyu; Zhang Rui; Wang Shanshan; Xu Huan; Yang Lina; Lou Jiahui; Chen Qiaozhu; Yao Lingwei; Yan Jinjin; Zhang Linyan; Ou Yiyao; Wu Ri Gu Mu La; Gu Yasha; Pan Hongyan
