= Football at the 1951 Asian Games – Men's team squads =

Below are the squads for the Football at the 1951 Asian Games in New Delhi, India.

== Afghanistan ==
No.	Pos.	Player	Date of birth (age)	Club
10	MF	Hamid Afzal		(Afghanistan Football Federation)
1	GK	Abdul Ghafoor Assar		(Afghanistan Football Federation) Mahmoudiyeh
9	FW	Sarwar Ayubi		(Afghanistan Football Federation)
7	MF	Farid Ahmad Maulawi		(Afghanistan Football Federation)
5	MF	Rahman Jahangir		(Afghanistan Football Federation)
15	MF	Yar Mohammed Barakzai		(Afghanistan Football Federation)
2	DF	Ata Mohammad		(Afghanistan Football Federation)
11	FW	Anwar Quadahri		(Afghanistan Football Federation)
8	MF	Khalil Ullah		(Afghanistan Football Federation)
6	DF	Abdul Ghafoor Yusufzai		(Afghanistan Football Federation)
4	DF	Hamid Yusufzai		(Afghanistan Football Federation)

== Burma ==
No.	Pos.	Player	Date of birth (age)	Club
	GK	Seaton Aukim		(Myanmar Football Federation)
	DF	R. Rodricks		(Myanmar Football Federation)
	DF	Pe Myint		(Myanmar Football Federation)
	MF	Ba Kyu		(Myanmar Football Federation)
	DF	Hla Kyaing		(Myanmar Football Federation)
	MF	H.G. Munro (c)		(Myanmar Football Federation)
	FW	T. van Dockum		(Myanmar Football Federation)
	FW	Gwan Shein		(Myanmar Football Federation)
	FW	Cham Sein		(Myanmar Football Federation)
	FW	Ba Than		(Myanmar Football Federation)
	FW	Sein Hline		(Myanmar Football Federation)

== India ==
Coach: Syed Abdul Rahim

No.	Pos.	Player	Date of birth (age)	Club
	GK	Berland Anthony		(All India Football Federation) Bengal
	DF	T.M. Varghese		(All India Football Federation) Bombay
	DF	Sailen Manna (c)	1 September 1924 (aged 26)	(All India Football Federation) Mohun Bagan
	MF	Sheikh Abdul Latif	15 August 1928 (aged 22)	(All India Football Federation) Mohammedan Sporting
	DF	Chandan Singh Rawat	26 July 1928 (aged 22)	(All India Football Federation) Services
	MF	Noor Mohammed		(All India Football Federation) Hyderabad City Police
	FW	Pansanttom Venkatesh		(All India Football Federation) East Bengal
	FW	Sahu Mewalal	1 July 1926 (aged 24)	(All India Football Federation) Eastern Railway
	FW	Ahmed Khan	24 December 1926 (aged 24)	(All India Football Federation) Bengal
	FW	P. B. A. Saleh	28 November 1928 (aged 22)	(All India Football Federation) Bengal
	GK	Kenchappa Varadaraj	7 May 1924 (aged 26)	(All India Football Federation) Mysore
	MF	T. Shanmugham	19 June 1920 (aged 30)	(All India Football Federation) Mysore
	FW	Santosh Nandy		(All India Football Federation) Bengal
	DF	Syed Khwaja Azizuddin	12 July 1930 (aged 20)	(All India Football Federation) Hyderabad City Police
	DF	Sunil Chatterjee		(All India Football Federation) Bengal
	MF	Abhoy Ghosh		(All India Football Federation) Bengal
	MF	D.N. Devine Jones	15 August 1928 (aged 22)	(All India Football Federation) Services
	FW	G.Y.S. Laiq		(All India Football Federation) Hyderabad City Police
	FW	Loganathan		(All India Football Federation) Madras
	FW	Madar Abdus Sattar		(All India Football Federation) Bengal
	FW	Runu Guha Thakurta		(All India Football Federation) Bengal
	FW	A. M. Bachan		(All India Football Federation) Orissa

== Indonesia ==
Coach: (Singapore) Choo Seng-Quee

No.	Pos.	Player	Date of birth (age)	Club
1	GK	Maulwi Saelan	8 August 1928 (aged 22)	(Football Association of Indonesia) PSM
2	DF	Chaeruddin Siregar	7 August 1929 (aged 21)	(Football Association of Indonesia) Persidja
3	DF	Sunar	1924	(Football Association of Indonesia) Persib
4	MF	Jahja		(Football Association of Indonesia) Persib
5	DF	M. Sidhi (c)		(Football Association of Indonesia) Persebaja
6	MF	Tan Liong Houw	26 July 1930 (aged 20)	(Football Association of Indonesia) Persidja
7	FW	Aang Witarsa	12 March 1930 (aged 20)	(Football Association of Indonesia) Persib
8	FW	Tee San Liong	3 March 1922 (aged 29)	(Football Association of Indonesia) Persebaja
9	FW	Darmadi		(Football Association of Indonesia) Persis Solo
10	FW	Bhe Ing Hien	1925	(Football Association of Indonesia) Persebaja
11	FW	Sugiono		(Football Association of Indonesia) PSIS
12	GK	Tan Mo Heng	28 February 1913 (aged 38)	(Football Association of Indonesia) Persebaja
13	MF	Aten	1918	(Football Association of Indonesia) Persib
14	FW	Ramlan Jatim	10 September 1922 (aged 28)	(Football Association of Indonesia) PSMS Medan
15	FW	Ramli Jatim	12 July 1921 (aged 29)	(Football Association of Indonesia) PSMS Medan
16	FW	Soleh		(Football Association of Indonesia)

== Iran ==
Coach: Hossein Sadaghiani

No.	Pos.	Player	Date of birth (age)	Club
	MF	Nader Afshar Alavinejad		(Football Federation Islamic Republic of Iran) Taj Tehran
	DF	Nader Afshar Naderi		(Football Federation Islamic Republic of Iran) Shahin Tehran
	GK	Amir Aghahosseini (c)		(Football Federation Islamic Republic of Iran) Shahin Tehran
	MF	Mohsen Azad		(Football Federation Islamic Republic of Iran) Shahin Tehran
	MF	Mahmoud Bayati	22 March 1928 (aged 22)	(Football Federation Islamic Republic of Iran) Taj Tehran
	FW	Masoud Boroumand	12 November 1928 (aged 22)	(Football Federation Islamic Republic of Iran) Shahin Tehran
	DF	Amir Eraghi		(Football Federation Islamic Republic of Iran) Shahin Tehran
	MF	Hossein Fekri	15 March 1924 (aged 26)	(Football Federation Islamic Republic of Iran) Daraei Tehran
	DF	Aref Gholizadeh		(Football Federation Islamic Republic of Iran) Taj Tehran
	DF	Mansour Hajian		(Football Federation Islamic Republic of Iran) Daraei Tehran
	MF	Parviz Kouzehkanani		(Football Federation Islamic Republic of Iran) Taj Tehran
	FW	George Markarian		(Football Federation Islamic Republic of Iran) Taj Tehran
	FW	Mehdi Masoud-Ansari		(Football Federation Islamic Republic of Iran) Shahin Tehran
	DF	Mehdi Nassiroghloo		(Football Federation Islamic Republic of Iran) Shahin Tehran
	MF	Mahmoud Shakibi		(Football Federation Islamic Republic of Iran) Shahin Tehran
	FW	Hossein Soroudi		(Football Federation Islamic Republic of Iran) Daraei Tehran
	GK	Ghorban Ali Tari		(Football Federation Islamic Republic of Iran) Daraei Tehran

== Japan ==
Coach: Hirokazu Ninomiya (player-coach)

No.	Pos.	Player	Date of birth (age)	Club
	GK	Yukio Tsuda	15 August 1917 (aged 33)	(Japan Football Association) East Japan Heavy Industries
	DF	Megumu Tamura	10 January 1927 (aged 24)	(Japan Football Association) Nippon Oil & Fats
	DF	Yoshio Okada	22 June 1926 (aged 24)	(Japan Football Association) Rokko Club
	MF	Koji Miyata	11 August 1926 (aged 24)	(Japan Football Association) Tanabe Pharmaceuticals
	DF	Nobuyuki Kato	2 January 1920 (aged 31)	(Japan Football Association) Tanabe Pharmaceuticals
	MF	Ko Arima	22 August 1917 (aged 33)	(Japan Football Association) Sankyo Pharmaceuticals
	MF	Shigeo Sugimoto	4 December 1926 (aged 24)	(Japan Football Association) Hankyu Railways
	FW	Masanori Tokita	24 June 1925 (aged 25)	(Japan Football Association) Tanabe Pharmaceuticals
	FW	Taro Kagawa	8 September 1922 (aged 28)	(Japan Football Association) Tanabe Pharmaceuticals
	FW	Hirokazu Ninomiya (c)	22 November 1917 (aged 33)	(Japan Football Association) Keio BRB
	FW	Toshio Iwatani	24 October 1925 (aged 25)	(Japan Football Association) Osaka SC
	FW	Takashi Kano	31 October 1920 (aged 30)	(Japan Football Association) Waseda WMW
	FW	Ken Noritake	18 June 1922 (aged 28)	(Japan Football Association) Nippon Yusen
	FW	Seki Matsunaga	25 June 1928 (aged 22)	(Japan Football Association) Hitachi
