= Iran at the 1951 Asian Games =

- IOC code: IRN
- NOC: National Olympic Committee of the Islamic Republic of Iran

in New Delhi
- Competitors: 49 in 5 sports
- Flag bearer: Mahmoud Namjoo
- Medals Ranked 3rd: Gold 8 Silver 6 Bronze 2 Total 16

Asian Games appearances (overview)
- 1951; 1954; 1958; 1962; 1966; 1970; 1974; 1978; 1982; 1986; 1990; 1994; 1998; 2002; 2006; 2010; 2014; 2018; 2022; 2026

Iran participated in the 1951 Asian Games held in the capital city of New Delhi, India from March 4, 1951, to March 11, 1951. This country is ranked 3rd with 8 gold medals in this edition of the Asiad. Ahmad Ordoubadi was the flagbearer for Iran in the opening ceremony.

== Competitors ==
Sport	Men	Women	Total
Athletics	8		8
Basketball	10		10
Cycling	1		1
Diving	2		2
Football	17		17
Swimming	2		2
Weightlifting	11		11
Total	49	0	49

- Ahmad Ordoubadi participated in both athletics and weightlifting.
- Hossein Soroudi participated in both basketball and football.

== Medal summary ==
=== Medals by sport ===
Sport	Gold	Silver	Bronze	Total
Athletics	1	1		2
Basketball			1	1
Diving		1	1	2
Football		1		1
Weightlifting	7	3		10
Total	8	6	2	16

=== Medalists ===
Medal	Name	Sport	Event
Gold	Ali Baghbanbashi	Athletics	Men's 5000 m
Gold	Mahmoud Namjoo	Weightlifting	Men's 56 kg
Gold	Jafar Salmasi	Weightlifting	Men's 60 kg
Gold	Hassan Ferdos	Weightlifting	Men's 67.5 kg
Gold	Firouz Pojhan	Weightlifting	Men's 75 kg
Gold	Hassan Rahnavardi	Weightlifting	Men's 82.5 kg
Gold	Rasoul Raeisi	Weightlifting	Men's 90 kg
Gold	Leon Kurukchian	Weightlifting	Men's +90 kg
Silver	Ali Baghbanbashi	Athletics	Men's 3000 m steeplechase
Silver	Taghi Asgari	Diving	Men's 10 m platform
Silver	Nader Afshar Alavinejad; Nader Afshar Naderi; Amir Aghahosseini; Mohsen Azad; Mahmoud Bayati; Masoud Boroumand; Amir Eraghi; Hossein Fekri; Aref Gholizadeh; Mansour Hajian; Parviz Kouzehkanani; George Markarian; Mehdi Masoud-Ansari; Mehdi Nassiroghloo; Mahmoud Shakibi; Hossein Soroudi; Ghorban Ali Tari	Football	Men
Silver	Ali Mirzaei	Weightlifting	Men's 56 kg
Silver	Jalal Mansouri	Weightlifting	Men's 75 kg
Silver	Ahmad Ordoubadi	Weightlifting	Men's +90 kg
Bronze	Hassan Khaleghpour; Kamal Mashhoun; Reza Masoumi; Kambiz Mokhberi; Alireza Oshar; Hossein Razi; Mashallah Safiyar; Hossein Saoudipour; Abolfazl Solbi; Hossein Soroudi	Basketball	Men
Bronze	Taghi Asgari	Diving	Men's 3 m springboard

== Results by event ==
=== Aquatics ===
==== Diving ====
Athlete	Event	Score	Rank
Taghi Asgari	Men's 3 m springboard	271.45	3rd place, bronze medalist(s)
Taghi Asgari	Men's 10 m platform	325.35	2nd place, silver medalist(s)
Manouchehr Khamoush	Men's 10 m platform	250.85	4

==== Swimming ====
Athlete	Event	Time	Rank
Mousa Boroumand	Men's 100 m freestyle		?
Tofigh Yousefzadeh	Men's 200 m breaststroke	3:11.2	4

=== Athletics ===
Men

Athlete	Event	Heat			Semifinal			Final		Rank
Athlete	Event	Heat	Time	Rank	Heat	Time	Rank	Time	Rank	Rank
Hossein Ali Archin	100 m	3		3	2		5	did not advance		?
Hossein Ali Archin	200 m	3		3						?
Ali Baghbanbashi	5000 m							15:54.2	1	1st place, gold medalist(s)
Ali Baghbanbashi	3000 m steeplechase							9:31.8	2	2nd place, silver medalist(s)

Athlete	Event	Result	Rank
Ahmad Ordoubadi	Shot put		?
Ahmad Ordoubadi	Discus throw		?

=== Basketball ===
Men

Squad list	Round 1	Round 2	Round 3	Round 4	Rank
Hossein Soroudi; Kamal Mashhoun; Alireza Oshar; Reza Masoumi; Mashallah Safiyar; Kambiz Mokhberi; Abolfazl Solbi; Hossein Saoudipour; Hossein Razi; Hassan Khaleghpour; Coach: Kazem Rahbari	Japan; L 34–40	India; W 63–52	Philippines; L 41–65	Burma; W 84–38	3rd place, bronze medalist(s)

=== Cycling ===
==== Road ====
Men

Athlete	Event	Time	Rank
Jasem Jasemzadeh	Road race		?

==== Track ====
Men

Athlete	Event	Heats		Semifinal	Final	Rank
Athlete	Event	Time	Rank	Semifinal	Final	Rank
Jasem Jasemzadeh	Sprint	did not start		did not advance		—

=== Football ===
Men

Squad list	Quarterfinal	Semifinal	Final	Rank
Nader Afshar Alavinejad; Nader Afshar Naderi; Amir Aghahosseini; Mohsen Azad; Mahmoud Bayati; Masoud Boroumand; Amir Eraghi; Hossein Fekri; Aref Gholizadeh; Mansour Hajian; Parviz Kouzehkanani; George Markarian; Mehdi Masoud-Ansari; Mehdi Nassiroghloo; Mahmoud Shakibi; Hossein Soroudi; Ghorban Ali Tari; Coach: Mostafa Salimi	Burma; W 2–0	Japan; W 0–0, 3–2 Rep	India; L 0–1	2nd place, silver medalist(s)

=== Weightlifting ===
Athlete	Event	Press (lb)	Snatch (lb)	Jerk (lb)	Total (lb)	Rank
Ali Mirzaei	Men's 56 kg	205	200	250	655	2nd place, silver medalist(s)
Mahmoud Namjoo	Men's 56 kg	205.25	214.75	280	700	1st place, gold medalist(s)
Arsham Khachikian	Men's 60 kg				620	6
Jafar Salmasi	Men's 60 kg	210	210	255	675	1st place, gold medalist(s)
Hassan Ferdos	Men's 67.5 kg	210	220	265	695	1st place, gold medalist(s)
Jalal Mansouri	Men's 75 kg	230	230	295	755	2nd place, silver medalist(s)
Firouz Pojhan	Men's 75 kg	225	230	310	765	1st place, gold medalist(s)
Hassan Rahnavardi	Men's 82.5 kg	265	255	325	845	1st place, gold medalist(s)
Rasoul Raeisi	Men's 90 kg	255	240	310	805	1st place, gold medalist(s)
Leon Kurukchian	Men's +90 kg	235	230	310	775	1st place, gold medalist(s)
Ahmad Ordoubadi	Men's +90 kg	215	225	285	725	2nd place, silver medalist(s)
