= Iran national football team results (1941–1959) =

This is a list of official football games played by Iran national football team between 1941 and 1959.

== 1941 ==
Friendly

25 August 1941

Afghanistan	0–0	Iran
	Report

Ghazi Stadium, Kabul
Attendance: 10,000

== 1949 ==
Friendly

26 October 1949

Iran	4–0	Afghanistan
Mobasher; Boroumand	Report

Amjadieh Stadium, Tehran

== 1950 ==
Friendly

28 May 1950

Turkey	6–1	Iran
Eken 16', 38', 39'; Deringör 21', 87'; Küçükandonyadis 48'	Report	Khalili 3'

İnönü Stadium, Istanbul

Friendly

27 October 1950

Iran	5–1	Pakistan
Boroumand; Khatami; Shakibi	Report	Wahid

Amjadieh Stadium, Tehran
Attendance: 17,000

== 1951 ==
1951 Asian Games – Quarterfinal

5 March 1951
15:00

Iran	2–0	Burma
Afshar 17'; Kouzehkanani 60'	Report

National Stadium, New Delhi
Attendance: 17,000

1951 Asian Games – Semifinal

7 March 1951
15:00

Iran	0–0 (a.e.t.)	Japan
	Report

National Stadium, New Delhi
Attendance: 15,000

1951 Asian Games – Semifinal (Replay)

8 March 1951
17:00

Iran	3–2	Japan
Masoud-Ansari 21', 42'; Boroumand 58'	Report	Tokita 40'; Ninomiya 50'

National Stadium, New Delhi
Attendance: 15,000

1951 Asian Games – Final

10 March 1951

India	1–0	Iran
Mewalal 34'	Report

National Stadium, New Delhi
Attendance: 25,000

== 1952 ==
Friendly

23 April 1952

Pakistan	0–0	Iran
	Report

YMCA Ground, Karachi
Attendance: 35,000

== 1958 ==
1958 Asian Games – Preliminary round

26 May 1958
14:00

Israel	4–0	Iran
Glazer 21'; Stelmach 30', 78'; Reznik 66' (pen.)	Report

Metropolitan Stadium, Tokyo
Attendance: 7,500
Referee: Shigeaki Murakata (Japan)

1958 Asian Games – Preliminary round

28 May 1958

South Korea	5–0	Iran
Lee Soo-nam 6'; Kim Young-jin 33'; Moon Jung-sik 50'; Choi Chung-min 53'; Woo Sang-kwon 84'	Report

Metropolitan Stadium, Tokyo
Attendance: 7,000

== 1959 ==
1960 AFC Asian Cup qualifier

5 December 1959

Israel	0–3	Iran
	Report	Hajari 49'; Barmaki 59'; Dehdari 65'

Maharaja's College Stadium, Kochi
Attendance: 30,000
Referee: P. Chakravarthy (India)

1960 AFC Asian Cup qualifier

9 December 1959

Iran	1–4	Pakistan
Haji Mokhtar 10'	Report	Umer 21', 35', 37'; Faqir 28'

Maharaja's College Stadium, Kochi
Attendance: 15,000

1960 AFC Asian Cup qualifier

11 December 1959

India	3–1	Iran
Goswami 64'; Khan 66' (pen.); Balaram 80'	Report	Dehdari 62'

Maharaja's College Stadium, Kochi
Attendance: 20,000
Referee: Masudur Rahman (Pakistan)

1960 AFC Asian Cup qualifier

12 December 1959

Israel	1–1	Iran
Menchel 9'	Report	Hajari 49'

Maharaja's College Stadium, Kochi
Attendance: 15,000
Referee: P. Chakravarthy (India)

1960 AFC Asian Cup qualifier

14 December 1959

Pakistan	1–4	Iran
Qayyum	Report	Hajari; Jamali

Maharaja's College Stadium, Kochi
Attendance: 16,000

1960 AFC Asian Cup qualifier

18 December 1959

India	1–2	Iran
Khan 64'	Report	Dehdari

Maharaja's College Stadium, Kochi
Attendance: 25,000

== Statistics ==
=== Results by year ===
Year	Pld	W	D	L	GF	GA	GD
1941	1	0	1	0	0	0	0
1949	1	1	0	0	4	0	+4
1950	2	1	0	1	6	7	−1
1951	4	2	1	1	5	3	+2
1952	1	0	1	0	0	0	0
1958	2	0	0	2	0	9	−9
1959	6	3	1	2	12	10	+2
Total	17	7	4	6	27	29	−2

=== Managers ===
Name	First match	Last match	Pld	W	D	L	GF	GA	GD
(Iran) Hossein Sadaghiani	25 August 1941	27 October 1950	4	2	1	1	10	7	+3
(Iran) Mostafa Salimi	5 March 1951	2 April 1952	5	2	2	1	5	3	+2
(Iran) Hossein Sadaghiani	26 May 1958	28 May 1958	2	0	0	2	0	9	−9
(Hungary) Francisc Mészáros	5 December 1959	18 December 1959	6	3	1	2	12	10	+2
Total			17	7	4	6	27	29	−2

=== Opponents ===
Team	Pld	W	D	L	GF	GA	GD
Afghanistan	2	1	1	0	4	0	+4
India	3	1	0	2	3	5	−2
Israel	3	1	1	1	4	5	−1
Japan	2	1	1	0	3	2	+1
Korea, South	1	0	0	1	0	5	−5
Myanmar	1	1	0	0	2	0	+2
Pakistan	4	2	1	1	10	6	+4
Turkey	1	0	0	1	1	6	−5
Total	17	7	4	6	27	29	−2
