= 1954 in Japanese football =

1954 season

Japanese football in 1954.

== Emperor's Cup ==
May 25, 1954

Keio BRB	5–3	Toyo Industries
? ?' ? ?' ? ?' ? ?' ? ?'		? ?' ? ?' ? ?'

Yamanashi Prefectural Stadium

== National team ==
=== Results ===
1954.03.07	Japan	1–5	South Korea	Tokyo, Japan
	Naganuma 16'	JFA	? ?' ? ?' ? ?' ? ?' ? ?'	Stadium: Meiji Jingu Gaien Stadium; Attendance: 8,000

1954.03.14	Japan	2–2	South Korea	Tokyo, Japan
	Iwatani 16', 60'	JFA	? ?' ? ?'	Stadium: Meiji Jingu Gaien Stadium; Attendance: 13,000

1954.05.01	Japan	3–5	Indonesia	Manila, Philippines
	Kano 13'; Tokita 70'; Takabayashi 79'	JFA	? ?' ? ?' ? ?' ? ?' ? ?'

1954.05.03	Japan	2–3	India	Manila, Philippines
	Takabayashi 47'; Kano 78'	JFA	? ?' ? ?' ? ?'

=== Players statistics ===
Player	-1953	03.07	03.14	05.01	05.03	1954	Total
Taizo Kawamoto	6(4)	-	O	O	O	3(0)	9(4)
Toshio Iwatani	3(2)	-	O(2)	O	-	2(2)	5(4)
Masanori Tokita	3(1)	-	O	O(1)	O	3(1)	6(2)
Hirokazu Ninomiya	3(1)	O	-	O	O	3(0)	6(1)
Takashi Kano	3(0)	O	O	O(1)	O(1)	4(2)	7(2)
Yoshio Okada	3(0)	O	O	O	O	4(0)	7(0)
Koji Miyata	3(0)	O	-	O	O	3(0)	6(0)
Taro Kagawa	2(0)	O	O	O	-	3(0)	5(0)
Shigeo Sugimoto	2(0)	O	-	-	-	1(0)	3(0)
Takashi Takabayashi	0(0)	-	O	O(1)	O(1)	3(2)	3(2)
Ryuzo Hiraki	0(0)	-	O	O	O	3(0)	3(0)
Nobuo Matsunaga	0(0)	-	O	O	O	3(0)	3(0)
Masao Ono	0(0)	-	O	O	O	3(0)	3(0)
Ken Naganuma	0(0)	O(1)	-	-	O	2(1)	2(1)
Hiroto Muraoka	0(0)	O	-	O	-	2(0)	2(0)
Arawa Kimura	0(0)	O	-	-	O	2(0)	2(0)
Hidemaro Watanabe	0(0)	-	O	-	O	2(0)	2(0)
Osamu Yamaji	0(0)	O	-	-	-	1(0)	1(0)
Takeshi Inoue	0(0)	O	-	-	-	1(0)	1(0)

== Births ==
- April 2 – Yuji Kishioku
- April 5 – Yoshiichi Watanabe
- May 13 – Hideki Maeda
- September 13 – Shigeharu Ueki
- October 29 – Hisao Sekiguchi
