= Basketball at the 1951 Asian Games =

- Venue: National Stadium
- Date: 5–10 March 1951
- Nations: 5

Basketball was one of the six initial disciplines which was held at the 1951 Asian Games in New Delhi, India, wherein five Asian teams—Burma, India, Iran, Japan and Philippines—participated. In the matches, round-robin format was employed and on the basis of final points table top three podium places were decided. Philippines team without losing a single match topped the points table and grabbed the gold medal, their first of their basketball supremacy in the Asian Games. (They eventually won the next three editions, until 1962.) Japanese squad finished behind it and won a silver medal, Iranian team with two wins finished third and won a bronze. Host nation India, finished fourth with only single win over Burma, which came last without winning a single match.

== Medalists ==
Event	Gold	Silver	Bronze
Men	Philippines; Francisco Calilan; Andres dela Cruz; Genaro Fernandez; Jose Gochangco; Rafael Hechanova; Moro Lorenzo; Carlos Loyzaga; Antonio Martinez; Lauro Mumar; Ignacio Ramos; Meliton Santos; Mariano Tolentino	Japan; Makoto Arai; Mitsugu Hachiya; Hiroshi Ikeda; Junichi Iwao; Michio Katayama; Fumio Matsuoka; Kasaburo Ogura; Shuzo Okubo; Shigeru Saito; Minoru Takahashi; Mitsuhide Tsudi	Iran; Hassan Khaleghpour; Kamal Mashhoun; Reza Masoumi; Kambiz Mokhberi; Alireza Oshar; Hossein Razi; Mashallah Safiyar; Hossein Saoudipour; Abolfazl Solbi; Hossein Soroudi

== Results ==
Pos	Team	Pld	W	L	PF	PA	PD	Pts
1	Philippines	4	4	0	271	129	+142	8
2	Japan	4	3	1	224	156	+68	7
3	Iran	4	2	2	222	195	+27	6
4	India	4	1	3	184	266	−82	5
5	Burma	4	0	4	123	278	−155	4

Source: Results

5 March

Burma	19–63	Philippines

National Stadium, New Delhi

5 March

Iran	34–40	Japan

National Stadium, New Delhi

6 March

India	52–63	Iran

National Stadium, New Delhi

6 March

Burma	19–81	Japan

National Stadium, New Delhi

7 March

Iran	41–65	Philippines

National Stadium, New Delhi

7 March

India	46–70	Japan

National Stadium, New Delhi

8 March

Burma	47–50	India

National Stadium, New Delhi

9 March

Japan	33–57	Philippines

National Stadium, New Delhi

10 March

Burma	38–84	Iran

National Stadium, New Delhi

10 March

India	36–86	Philippines

National Stadium, New Delhi

== Final standing ==
Rank	Team	Pld	W	L
1st place, gold medalist(s)	Philippines	4	4	0
2nd place, silver medalist(s)	Japan	4	3	1
3rd place, bronze medalist(s)	Iran	4	2	2
4	India	4	1	3
5	Burma	4	0	4
