= Weightlifting at the 1951 Asian Games =

- Venue: National Stadium
- Dates: 5–8 March 1951

Weightlifting was contested from 5 to 8 March at the 1951 Asian Games in National Stadium, New Delhi, India. The competition included only men's events for seven different weight categories. Iranians dominated in all events and claimed 10 medals in total including seven golds.

== Medalists ==
Event	Gold	Silver	Bronze
Bantamweight (56 kg)	Mahmoud Namjoo; Iran	Ali Mirzaei; Iran	Pedro Landero; Philippines
Featherweight (60 kg)	Jafar Salmasi; Iran	Rodrigo del Rosario; Philippines	Yukio Iguchi; Japan
Lightweight (67.5 kg)	Hassan Ferdos; Iran	Peter Ho; Singapore	Minoru Kubota; Japan
Middleweight (75 kg)	Firouz Pojhan; Iran	Jalal Mansouri; Iran	Ba Thein; Burma
Light heavyweight (82.5 kg)	Hassan Rahnavardi; Iran	Cheong Kok Cheong; Singapore	Thein Han; Burma
Middle heavyweight (90 kg)	Rasoul Raeisi; Iran	Kamineni Eswara Rao; India	Maung Maung Lwin; Burma
Heavyweight (+90 kg)	Leon Kurukchian; Iran	Ahmad Ordoubadi; Iran	Dandamudi Rajagopal; India

== Medal table ==
Rank	Nation	Gold	Silver	Bronze	Total
1	Iran (IRN)	7	3	0	10
2	Singapore (SIN)	0	2	0	2
3	India (IND)	0	1	1	2
3	Philippines (PHI)	0	1	1	2
5	Burma (BIR)	0	0	3	3
6	Japan (JPN)	0	0	2	2
Totals (6 entries)		7	7	7	21
