= Hidemaro =

- Gender: Male

Origin
- Origin: Japanese
- Meaning: Different meanings depending on the kanji used

Hidemaro (written: 秀麿 or 英麿) is a masculine Japanese given name. Notable people with the name include:

- Hidemaro Fujibayashi (藤林 秀麿; born 1972), Japanese video game designer
- Hidemaro Konoye (近衛 秀麿; 1898–1973), Japanese classical composer and conductor
- Hidemaro Watanabe (渡部 英麿; 1924–2011), Japanese footballer
