= Ko Arima =

Japanese footballer (born 1917)

Ko Arima 有馬 洪
Personal information
- Full name: Ko Arima
- Date of birth: August 22, 1917
- Place of birth: Empire of Japan
- Position: Midfielder

Youth career
- Tokyo Imperial University

Senior career*
Years	Team	Apps	(Gls)
- Sankyo Pharmaceuticals

International career
1951	Japan	3	(0)
Medal record
University of Tokyo LB
Winner	Emperor's Cup	1949
Representing Japan
Asian Games
Bronze medal – third place	1951 New Delhi	Team
- * Club domestic league appearances and goals

Ko Arima (有馬 洪, Arima Kō; born August 22, 1917) is a Japanese former football player. He played for Japan national team.

== Club career ==
Arima was born on August 22, 1917. After graduating from Tokyo Imperial University (currently University of Tokyo), he played for Sankyo Pharmaceuticals. He also played for University of Tokyo LB, which was composed of his alma mater University of Tokyo players and graduates. At University of Tokyo LB, he won the 1949 Emperor's Cup with Masao Ono and the rest of the team.

== National team career ==
In March 1951, when Arima was 33 years old, he was selected for the Japan national team for Japan's first game after World War II in the 1951 Asian Games. At this competition, on March 7, he first played against Iran, and in total played three games for Japan in 1951.

== National team statistics ==
Japan national team
Year	Apps	Goals
1951	3	0
Total	3	0

== Honours ==
Japan

- Asian Games Bronze medal: 1951
