= Masao Ono =

Japanese footballer

Masao Ono 大埜 正雄
Personal information
- Full name: Masao Ono
- Date of birth: March 2, 1923
- Place of birth: Kanagawa, Empire of Japan
- Date of death: February 11, 2001 (aged 77)
- Place of death: Japan
- Position: Midfielder

Youth career
- Shonan High School
- 1940–????: University of Tokyo

Senior career*
Years	Team	Apps	(Gls)
- University of Tokyo LB
- Nissan Chemical

International career
1954	Japan	3	(0)
Medal record
University of Tokyo LB
Winner	Emperor's Cup	1949
- * Club domestic league appearances and goals

Masao Ono (大埜 正雄, Ono Masao; March 2, 1923 – February 11, 2001) was a Japanese football player. He played for Japan national team.

== Club career ==
Ono was born in Kanagawa Prefecture on March 2, 1923. After graduating from University of Tokyo, he joined Nissan Chemical. He also played for University of Tokyo LB was consisted of his alma mater University of Tokyo players and graduates. At University of Tokyo LB, he won 1949 Emperor's Cup with Ko Arima and so on.

== National team career ==
In March 1954, Ono was selected Japan national team for 1954 World Cup qualification. At this qualification, on March 14, he debuted against South Korea. He also played at 1954 Asian Games. He played 3 games for Japan in 1954.

On February 11, 2001, Ono died of ruptured aneurysm of abdomen at the age of 77.

== National team statistics ==
Japan national team
Year	Apps	Goals
1954	3	0
Total	3	0
