= Sattar Basheer =

Indian footballer

Personal information
- Full name: Sattar A Basheer
- Date of birth: 1924
- Place of birth: Bangalore, British India
- Date of death: 1987 (aged 62–63)

Senior career*
Years	Team	Apps	(Gls)
- Mysore

International career
- India
- * Club domestic league appearances and goals

Sattar Basheer (1924–1987) was an Indian footballer. He competed in the men's tournament at the 1948 Summer Olympics.

== Honours ==
Mysore

- Santosh Trophy: 1946–47, 1952–53
