= Berland Anthony =

Indian footballer

Personal information
- Full name: Berland Anthony
- Date of birth: 1923
- Place of birth: Maharashtra, India
- Position: Goalkeeper

Senior career*
Years	Team	Apps	(Gls)
- East Bengal

International career
- India
Medal record
Men's football
Representing India
Asian Games
Gold medal – first place	1951 New Delhi	Team
- * Club domestic league appearances and goals

Berland Anthony (born 1923) was an Indian professional footballer who played as a goalkeeper for East Bengal and India in both the 1951 Asian Games and 1952 Summer Olympics.

== International ==
Anthony was part of the India side that participated and won gold during the 1951 Asian Games held in India. He was also part of the India squad that participated in the 1952 Summer Olympics in Helsinki. He started in India's only match that tournament against Yugoslavia on 15 July 1952. India were knocked-out as they lost 10–1.

== Honours ==
India

- Asian Games Gold medal: 1951
