= K. V. Varadaraj =

Indian footballer

Kenchappa Varadaraj
- Kenchappa Varadaraj in the India National Football Team at 1948 London Olympics

Personal information
- Full name: Kenchappa Varadaiah Varadaraj
- Date of birth: 7 May 1924
- Place of birth: Mysore
- Date of death: 20 December 2011 (aged 87)
- Place of death: Basaveshwaranagar, Bangalore, Karnataka, India
- Position: Goalkeeper

Senior career*
Years	Team	Apps	(Gls)
- Mysore

International career
- India
Medal record
Men's football
Representing India
Asian Games
Gold medal – first place	1951 New Delhi	Team
- * Club domestic league appearances and goals

Kenchappa Varadaiah Varadaraj (7 May 1924 – 20 December 2011) was an Indian footballer. He competed for India at the 1948 Summer Olympics.

== Honours ==
India

- Asian Games Gold medal: 1951
- Asian Quadrangular Football Tournament: 1953

Mysore

- Santosh Trophy: 1952–53

== See also ==
- Football at the 1948 Summer Olympics
