= 1952–53 Santosh Trophy =

Tournament details
- Country: India
- Dates: November 8, 1952

Final positions
- Champions: Mysore (2nd title)
- Runners-up: Bengal
- 60 minute matches

The 1952–53 Santosh Trophy was the 9th edition of the Santosh Trophy, the main State competition for football in India. It was held in 1952 in Bangalore, Karnataka. Mysore won their second title beating Bengal 1–0 in the final. This ended a sequence of four consecutive wins for Bengal.

== Final ==
8 November 1952

Mysore	1–0	Bengal
Nizamuddin 10'	Report

Madras
Referee: B. Srinivas

== Squads ==
- Mysore : Varadaraj; Yesudoss and Muthoo; Thammiah, Basheer and Shanmugam; Nizamuddin, Sampangi, Nari, Bernard and Mari
- Bengal : Ghatak; Barman and Manna; Latif, Chandan Singh and Gokul; Babu, Banerji, Raman, Ahmed and Antony
