= Ken Noritake =

Japanese footballer

Ken Noritake 則武 謙
Personal information
- Full name: Ken Noritake
- Date of birth: July 18, 1922
- Place of birth: Empire of Japan
- Date of death: March 6, 1994 (aged 71)
- Place of death: Japan
- Position: Forward

Youth career
- Kobe Daiichi High School
- Kobe University of Economics

Senior career*
Years	Team	Apps	(Gls)
- Nippon Yusen

International career
1951	Japan	1	(0)
Medal record
All Keio
Winner	Emperor's Cup	1952
Representing Japan
Asian Games
Bronze medal – third place	1951 New Delhi	Team
- * Club domestic league appearances and goals

Ken Noritake (則武 謙, Noritake Ken; July 18, 1922 – March 6, 1994) was a Japanese football player who played for the Japan national team.

== Club career ==
Noritake was born on July 18, 1922. After graduating from Kobe University of Economics, he played for Nippon Yusen. He also played for All Keio and won 1952 Emperor's Cup.

== National team career ==
In March 1951, Noritake was selected Japan national team for Japan team first game after World War II, 1951 Asian Games. At this competition, on March 9, he debuted against Afghanistan.

Noritake died on March 6, 1994, at the age of 71.

== National team statistics ==
Japan national team
Year	Apps	Goals
1951	1	0
Total	1	0

== Honours ==
Japan

- Asian Games Bronze medal: 1951
