= D. N. Devine Jones =

Indian Brigadier of the Indian Army

Personal information
- Full name: Desmond Neville Devine-Jones
- Date of birth: 15 August 1928
- Date of death: 11 July 2010 (aged 81)
- Place of death: Pune

Senior career*
Years	Team	Apps	(Gls)
- Services

International career
- India
Medal record
Men's football
Representing India
Asian Games
Gold medal – first place	1951 New Delhi	Team
- * Club domestic league appearances and goals

Desmond Neville Devine-Jones (15 August 1928 – 11 July 2010) was a Brigadier in the Army Physical Training Corps (APTC) of the Indian Army. He was part of the 1951 Indian Men's Football team at the 1951 Asian Games which won the gold medal in Delhi.

Devine-Jones was also the boxing coach for the Indian Olympic team for the 1972 Munich Olympics, as well as the country's flag bearer. He was elected secretary of the Indian Amateur Boxing Federation in 1976 and then reelected in 1980. He was an AIBA qualified Referee and Judge and officiated many international boxing championships. He was also elected as an executive committee member of AIBA in 1986.

== Honours ==
India

- Asian Games Gold medal: 1951

Olympic Games
Preceded by Gurbachan Singh Randhawa	Flagbearer for India; Munich 1972	Succeeded by Zafar Iqbal
