= Burma at the 1951 Asian Games =

- IOC code: BIR

in New Delhi
- Medals Ranked 8th: Gold 0 Silver 0 Bronze 3 Total 3

Asian Games appearances (overview)
- 1951; 1954; 1958; 1962; 1966; 1970; 1974; 1978; 1982; 1986; 1990; 1994; 1998; 2002; 2006; 2010; 2014; 2018; 2022; 2026

Burma, now known as Myanmar, participated in the 1951 Asian Games held in the city of New Delhi, India from 4 March 1951 to 11 March 1951. This country is ranked 8th with 3 bronze medals in this edition of the Asiad.

== Medal summary ==
=== Medal table ===
Sport	Gold	Silver	Bronze	Total
Weightlifting	0	0	3	3
Total	0	0	3	3

=== Medalists ===
Medal	Name	Sport	Event
Bronze	Ba Thein	Weightlifting	Men's Middleweight (75kg)
Bronze	Thein Han	Weightlifting	Men's Light Heavyweight (82.5 kg)
Bronze	Maung Manug Lwin	Weightlifting	Men's Middle Heavyweight (90kg)
