= T. Shanmugham =

Indian footballer

Personal information
- Full name: Thulukhanam Shanmugham
- Date of birth: 19 June 1920
- Place of birth: Austin Town, Bangalore, India
- Date of death: 13 December 2012 (aged 92)
- Place of death: Bengaluru, Karnataka, India
- Position: Left-half

Senior career*
Years	Team	Apps	(Gls)
- Maharaja Socials
- Bangalore Student FC
- Sullivan Police SC
1944–1954	Mysore		

International career
- India

Managerial career
- 1964–1978: Karnataka
- 1979–1996: Salgaocar FC
Medal record
Men's football
Representing India
Asian Games
Gold medal – first place	1951 New Delhi	Team
- * Club domestic league appearances and goals

Thulukhanam Shanmugham (19 June 1920 – 13 December 2012) was an Indian footballer who represented his country in the 1952 Olympic Games.

== Playing career ==
Born in Austin Town, Bangalore, Shanmugham played for Mysore State for most of his career, spurning offers to play for teams from Kolkata. He was a gold medalist at the first Asian Games in 1951.

== Coaching career ==
Shanmugham was part of the first batch of coaches that came out of the National Institute of Sports, Patiala, in 1961. He was also one of the earliest to attend the 93-day FIFA coaching under Dettmar Cramer in Tokyo in 1969. He was the coach of four Santosh Trophy winning sides and won two Federation Cup victories as manager of Salgaocar. He was also a national selector.

== Career outside football ==
Shanmugham was a police officer by profession and served the Mysore city police for 35 years, working as a security officer to two state governors.

== Honours ==
=== Player ===
India

- Asian Games Gold medal: 1951

Mysore

- Santosh Trophy: 1946–47, 1952–53

=== Manager ===
Salgaocar

- Federation Cup: 1988–89, 1989–90

Mysore

- Santosh Trophy: 1967–68, 1968–69

Goa

- Santosh Trophy: 1982–83, 1983–84
