= A. M. Bachan =

Indian association football player

Personal information
- Full name: Mohammad Abdul Majid
- Place of birth: Cuttack, Orissa, British India
- Position: Forward

Senior career*
Years	Team	Apps	(Gls)
- Mohammedan
- Orissa

International career
1951	India		
Medal record
Men's football
Representing India
Asian Games
Gold medal – first place	1951 New Delhi	Team
- * Club domestic league appearances and goals

Abdul Majid "Bachan" was an Indian association football player who played as a forward for Mohammedan SC and the India football team. He is the first footballer from Odisha to play internationally for India. The Bachan Memorial Football Tournament, organised by the Cuttack District Athletic Association (CDAA) at Cuttack is held in his memory.

== Club career ==
Bachan played for the Calcutta club Mohammedan SC and was the captain of the squad that won their 8th Calcutta Football League title in 1948. He was the top scorer of that season with 21 goals.

Bachan represented the Orissa state in the Santosh Trophy. He was part of the team which reached the semi-finals of the Santosh Trophy for the first time in the 1950–51 edition held at Calcutta.

== International career ==
Bachan was part of the India national squad that played at the 1951 Asian Games.

== Honours ==
India

- Asian Games Gold medal: 1951

Mohammedan Sporting

- Calcutta Football League: 1948
