= Jafar Salmasi =

Iranian weightlifter (1918–2000)

Jafar Salmassi
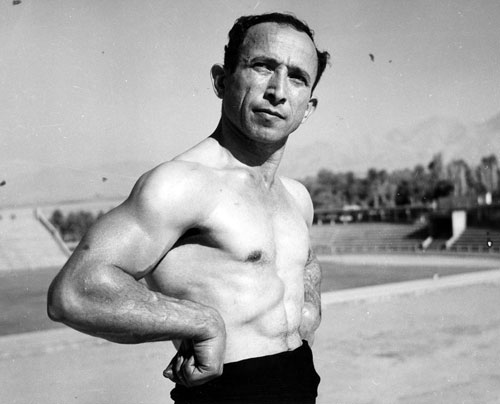
Medal record
Representing Iran
Men's weightlifting
Olympic Games
Bronze medal – third place	1948 London	60 kg
Asian Games
Gold medal – first place	1951 New Delhi	60 kg

Jafar Salmassi (Persian: محمدجعفر سلماسی, 22 September 1918 – 31 January 2000) was an Iranian weightlifter who won Iran's first Olympic medal at 1948 Summer Olympics.

== Early life ==
Jafar Salmassi was born in Kadhimiya, Iraq but was originally from Salmas in northwestern Iran. Before he began his career as a weightlifter, he was a teacher at an Iranian school in Baghdad. An accomplished athlete, he taught himself gymnastics moves by reading illustrated books.

He discovered weightlifting in his late 20s during a trip to Tehran and later was asked by the Iranian government to compete in a national weightlifting tournament. He won, and in 1948 went to London to compete for Iran's first Olympic team.

== International weightlifting career ==
On 7 July 1948, he won the bronze medal in the 56 – 60 kg featherweight event.

He was the Iranian champion in the featherweight weight class for five years, 1944 through 1948.

Salmassi returned to Baghdad after the Olympics. Later, won the gold medal at the 1951 Asian Games in New Delhi.

== Later life ==
Later, Salmassi trained Iraqi weightlifters and continued teaching Iranian students there. When Saddam Hussein took power, Salmassi left Iraq and moved to Iran with his family.

He died in Tehran in January 2000.

Olympic Games
Preceded by Mahmoud Namjoo	Flagbearer for Iran; Rome 1960	Succeeded by Nosratollah Shahmir
