= Takashi Takabayashi =

Japanese footballer

Takashi Takabayashi 高林 隆
Personal information
- Full name: Takashi Takabayashi
- Date of birth: August 2, 1931
- Place of birth: Saitama, Empire of Japan
- Date of death: December 27, 2009 (aged 78)
- Place of death: Saitama, Japan
- Height: 1.64 m (5 ft 4 1/2 in)
- Position: Forward

Youth career
- 1947–1949: Kasukabe High School
- 1950–1953: Rikkyo University

Senior career*
Years	Team	Apps	(Gls)
1954–?	Tanabe Pharmaceutical		
- Osaka SC

International career
1954–1958	Japan	9	(2)
- * Club domestic league appearances and goals

Takashi Takabayashi (高林 隆, Takabayashi Takashi; August 2, 1931 – December 27, 2009) was a Japanese football player. He played for Japan national team.

== Club career ==
Takabayashi was born in Saitama on August 2, 1931. After graduating from Rikkyo University, he played for Tanabe Pharmaceutical. He also played for Osaka SC.

== National team career ==
In March 1954, when Takabayashi was a Rikkyo University student, he was selected Japan national team for 1954 World Cup qualification. At this qualification, on March 14, he debuted against South Korea. In May, he played at 1954 Asian Games and scored 2 goals. In 1956, he was selected Japan for 1956 Summer Olympics, but he did not compete. He also played at 1958 Asian Games. He played 9 games and scored 2 goals for Japan until 1954.

On December 27, 2009, Takabayashi died of heart failure in Saitama at the age of 78.

== National team statistics ==
Japan national team
Year	Apps	Goals
1954	3	2
1955	5	0
1956	0	0
1957	0	0
1958	1	0
Total	9	2
