= Thenmadom Varghese =

Indian footballer

Personal information
- Full name: Thenmadom Mathew Varghese
- Date of birth: 1920
- Place of birth: Tiruvalla, Kerala, British India
- Date of death: 10 January 1979
- Place of death: Parel, Mumbai
- Position: Defender

Senior career*
Years	Team	Apps	(Gls)
- Thiruvalla Police
- Travancore State
- Tata Sports Club

International career
1948–1962	India		
Medal record
Men's football
Representing India
Asian Games
Gold medal – first place	1951 New Delhi	Team
- * Club domestic league appearances and goals

Thenmadom Mathew Varghese (1920 – 10 January 1979) was an Indian professional footballer who played as a defender and was also known as Thiruvalla Pappan and Tata Pappan.

He began his football career at the age of 16 by playing for Thiruvalla Town Club. He was inducted into Travancore State Police team by the first Inspector-general of police Khan Bahadur Sayid Abdul Karim Sahib Suhrawady. Then he was handpicked into Tata Sports Club, Mumbai. He represented Bombay in Santosh Trophy tournaments. From there he found his way to the India national football team.

T. Varghese represented India at the 1948 Summer Olympics and was considered one of the best defenders for India during the 1940s and 1950s. He is the first Malayali to participate in a team event in Olympic Games (1948 Olympics) and also the second Malayali to ever participate in Olympics. He was part of the Indian football team which won gold medal in Asian Games 1951.

After retiring from field he was associated with Tata Football Academy in Bombay for some period as a trainer. He died in 1979 while at Bombay.

He was married to Saramma and the family had four children including three daughters namely Lilian, Shanta Alex and Ann and a son named Mathew Varghese, who also died.

== Honours ==
India

- Asian Games Gold medal: 1951

Bombay

- Santosh Trophy: 1954–55

== See also ==
- List of Kerala Olympians
- C. K. Lakshmanan
