= Megumu Tamura =

Japanese footballer

Megumu Tamura 田村 恵
Personal information
- Full name: Megumu Tamura
- Date of birth: January 10, 1927
- Place of birth: Empire of Japan
- Date of death: October 8, 1986 (aged 59)
- Place of death: Chuo, Tokyo, Japan
- Position: Defender

Youth career
- Shonan High School
- Waseda University

Senior career*
Years	Team	Apps	(Gls)
- Nippon Oil & Fats

International career
1951	Japan	3	(0)
Medal record
Representing Japan
Asian Games
Bronze medal – third place	1951 New Delhi	Team
- * Club domestic league appearances and goals

Megumu Tamura (田村 恵, Tamura Megumu; January 10, 1927 – October 8, 1986) was a Japanese football player. He played for Japan national team.

== Club career ==
Tamura was born on January 10, 1927. He played for Nippon Oil & Fats.

== National team career ==
In March 1951, Tamura was selected Japan national team for Japan team first game after World War II, 1951 Asian Games. At this competition, on March 7, he debuted against Iran. He played 3 games for Japan in 1951.

On October 8, 1986, Tamura died of cancer in Chuo, Tokyo at the age of 59.

== National team statistics ==
Japan national team
Year	Apps	Goals
1951	3	0
Total	3	0

== Honours ==
Japan

- Asian Games Bronze medal: 1951
