= Meliton Santos =

Filipino basketball player (1928–1999)

Personal information
- Born: February 14, 1928
- Died: 1999 (aged 70–71) U.S.
Medals
Men's basketball
Representing Philippines
Asian Games
Gold medal – first place	1951 New Delhi	Team

Meliton Vizcarra Santos (February 14, 1928 – 1999) was a Filipino basketball player who competed in the 1952 Summer Olympics.
