= Santosh Nandy =

Indian footballer (born 1932)

Personal information
- Position: Forward

Senior career*
Years	Team	Apps	(Gls)
- Eastern Railway

International career
- India
Medal record
Men's football
Representing India
Asian Games
Gold medal – first place	1951 New Delhi	Team
- * Club domestic league appearances and goals

Santosh Nandy is a former football player, who played for India men's national football team. He was part of the team that won gold medal at the 1951 Asian Games. He scored a goal against Afghanistan in a 3–0 win.

== Honours ==
India

- Asian Games Gold medal: 1951
- Santosh Trophy: 1945–46, 1947–48, 1949–50
