= Hossein Saoudipour =

Iranian basketball player

Hossein Soudipour
- Born: 21 March 1922; Tehran, Iran
- Died: 13 September 2017 (aged 95)

Hossein Saoudipour
Medal record

Men's basketball

Representing Iran

Asian Games
| Bronze medal – third place | 1951 New Delhi | Team |

Hossein Soudipour (Persian: حسین صعودی‌پور; 21 March 1922 – 13 September 2017) was a medical doctor and former basketball player and head coach of Iran's national basketball team. He was the former director of Iran's ministry of health before the Iranian Revolution.

== Basketball career ==
Hossein was a part of Iran's national basketball team at the 1948 Summer Olympics in London, the first time that Iran's team qualified for the competition. He was also a member of the team when they won the bronze medal in the 1951 Asian Games in New Delhi. He was chosen personally by the late Shah Mohammad Reza Pahlavi to be on the team. His favorite player of all time was Bob Cousy. He was the head coach of the Iranian national basketball team from 1966 until 1968.
