= Takashi Kano =

Japanese footballer

Takashi Kano 加納 孝
Personal information
- Full name: Takashi Kano
- Date of birth: October 31, 1920
- Place of birth: Tokyo, Empire of Japan
- Date of death: June 4, 2000 (aged 79)
- Place of death: Ota, Tokyo, Japan
- Position: Forward

Youth career
- 1936–1938: Tokyo Daihachi High School
- 1939–1945: Waseda University

Senior career*
Years	Team	Apps	(Gls)
- Waseda WMW

International career
1951–1954	Japan	7	(2)
Medal record
Representing Japan
Asian Games
Bronze medal – third place	1951 New Delhi	Team
- * Club domestic league appearances and goals

Takashi Kano (加納 孝, Kano Takashi; October 31, 1920 – June 4, 2000) was a Japanese football player. He played for Japan national team.

== Club career ==
Kano was born in Tokyo on October 31, 1920. He played for Waseda WMW, which was composed alumni players from his alma mater, Waseda University. In 1940, he won second place at the 1940 Emperor's Cup. That tournament was the last Emperor's Cup before World War II, when it was suspended from 1941 to 1945.

== National team career ==
In March 1951, when Kano was 30 years old, he was selected for the Japan national team and their first game since the end of World War II, the 1951 Asian Games. At that competition, he debuted against Iran on March 7. He also played at the 1954 Asian Games and scored two goals. He played seven games and scored two goals for Japan until 1954.

On June 4, 2000, Kano died of heart failure in Ota, Tokyo at the age of 79.

== National team statistics ==
Japan national team
Year	Apps	Goals
1951	3	0
1952	0	0
1953	0	0
1954	4	2
Total	7	2

== Honours ==
Japan

- Asian Games Bronze medal: 1951
