= Ali Mirzaei (weightlifter) =

Iranian weightlifter (1929–2020)

- Mirzaei at the 1952 Summer Olympics

Personal information
- Nationality: Iranian
- Born: 28 January 1929 Tehran, Iran
- Died: 18 July 2020 (aged 91) Tehran, Iran

Sport
- Country: Iran
- Sport: Weightlifting
Medal record
Men's weightlifting
Representing Iran
Olympic Games
Bronze medal – third place	1952 Helsinki	56 kg
World Championships
Silver medal – second place	1951 Milan	56 kg
Bronze medal – third place	1954 Vienna	56 kg
Asian Games
Silver medal – second place	1951 New Delhi	56 kg

Ali Mirzaei (Persian: علی میرزایی, 28 January 1929 – 18 July 2020) was an Iranian weightlifter who competed in the 56 kg category. His greatest achievement was winning the bronze medal in the 1952 Summer Olympics in Helsinki). He won twice a medal at the World Championships. The silver medal in Milan at the 1951 World Weightlifting Championships and the bronze medal three years later in Vienna at the 1954 World Weightlifting Championships. He won the silver medal at the 1951 Asian Games. During his career Mirzaei set 1 world record.
