= Koji Miyata =

Japanese footballer and manager

Koji Miyata 宮田 孝治
Personal information
- Date of birth: January 15, 1923
- Place of birth: Empire of Japan
- Position: Midfielder

Youth career
- Kobe Daiichi High School
- Waseda University

Senior career*
Years	Team	Apps	(Gls)
1946–?	Tanabe Pharmaceutical		

International career
1951–1954	Japan	6	(0)

Managerial career
- 1961–1973: Tanabe Pharmaceuticals
Medal record
Representing Japan
Asian Games
Bronze medal – third place	1951 New Delhi	Team
- * Club domestic league appearances and goals

Koji Miyata (宮田 孝治, Miyata Koji; born January 15, 1923) is a Japanese former football player. He played for Japan national team.

== Club career ==
Miyata was born on January 15, 1923. After graduating from Waseda University, he joined Tanabe Pharmaceutical in 1946.

== International career ==
In March 1951, Miyata was selected Japan national team for Japan team first game after World War II, 1951 Asian Games. At this competition, on March 7, he debuted against Iran. He also played at 1954 Asian Games. He played 6 games for Japan until 1954.

== Coaching career ==
After retirement, Miyata became a manager for Tanabe Pharmaceutical in 1961. The club joined Japanese Regional Leagues in 1968 and new division Japan Soccer League Division 2. In 1972 season, he led the club 2nd place and promoted Division 1. However, in 1973 season, the club was the lowest place and he resigned.

== Career statistics ==
Japan national team
Year	Apps	Goals
1951	3	0
1952	0	0
1953	0	0
1954	3	0
Total	6	0

== Honours ==
Japan

- Asian Games Bronze medal: 1951
