= Wang Jingxia =

Chinese football player

Personal information
- Date of birth: 11 November 1976 (age 50)
- Position: Defender

International career
Years	Team	Apps	(Gls)
- China
Medal record
Women's football
Representing China
Asian Games
Gold medal – first place	1998 Bangkok	Team

Wang Jingxia is a Chinese football player. She was part of the Chinese team at the 1999 FIFA Women's World Cup.
