= Rasoul Raeisi =

Iranian weightlifter (1924–2015)

Personal information
- Full name: Seyyed Mir Rasoul Raeisi
- Born: 8 October 1924
- Died: 23 July 2015 (aged 90) Tehran, Iran
- Weight: 81 kg (179 lb)
Medal record
Representing Iran
World Championships
Bronze medal – third place	1949 Scheveningen	82.5 kg
Asian Games
Gold medal – first place	1951 New Delhi	90 kg

Rasoul Raeisi (Persian: رسول رئیسی, 8 October 1924 – 23 July 2015) was an Iranian weightlifter who competed in the 1948 Summer Olympics. He died on 23 July 2015.
