= Hassan Ferdos =

Iranian weightlifter (1929–1997)

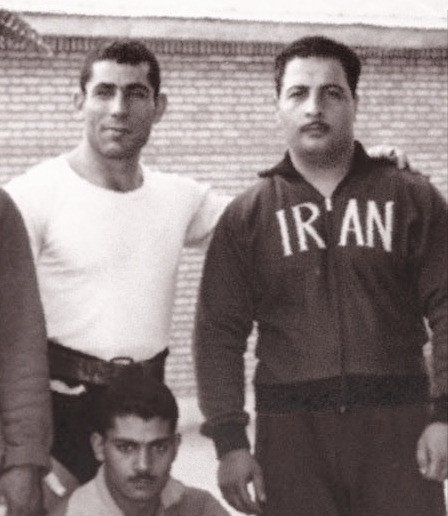
- Ferdos (right) in 1960

Personal information
- Born: امير حسن فردوس; 29 September 1929
- Died: 1997 (aged 67–68)

Sport
- Sport: Weightlifting
Medal record
Representing Iran
World Weightlifting Championships
Bronze medal – third place	1951 Milan	-67.5 kg
Asian Games
Gold medal – first place	1951 New Delhi	-67.5 kg

Amir Hassan Ferdos (29 September 1929 – 1997) was an Iranian lightweight weightlifter. In 1951 he won a gold medal at the Asian Games and a bronze at the world championships. Next year he placed fifth at the 1952 Summer Olympics.
