= Yoshio Okada =

Japanese footballer

Yoshio Okada 岡田 吉夫
Personal information
- Full name: Yoshio Okada
- Date of birth: August 11, 1926
- Place of birth: Kobe, Hyogo, Empire of Japan
- Date of death: June 22, 2002 (aged 75)
- Place of death: Hachioji, Tokyo, Japan
- Position: Defender

Youth career
- Kobe Daiichi High School
- Waseda University

Senior career*
Years	Team	Apps	(Gls)
- Kwangaku Club
- Rokko Club

International career
1951–1954	Japan	7	(0)
Medal record
Representing Japan
Asian Games
Bronze medal – third place	1951 New Delhi	Team
- * Club domestic league appearances and goals

Yoshio Okada (岡田 吉夫, Okada Yoshio; August 11, 1926 – June 22, 2002) was a Japanese football player. He played for Japan national team.

== Club career ==
Okada was born in Kobe on August 11, 1926. He played for Kwangaku Club and Rokko Club.

== National team career ==
In March 1951, Okada was selected Japan national team for Japan team first game after World War II, 1951 Asian Games. At this competition, on March 7, he debuted against Iran. He also played at 1954 Asian Games. He played 7 games for Japan until 1954.

On June 22, 2002, Okada died of heart failure in Hachioji at the age of 75.

== National team statistics ==
Japan national team
Year	Apps	Goals
1951	3	0
1952	0	0
1953	0	0
1954	4	0
Total	7	0

== Honours ==
Japan

- Asian Games Bronze medal: 1951
