= Hidemaro Watanabe =

Japanese footballer

Hidemaro Watanabe 渡部 英麿
Personal information
- Full name: Hidemaro Watanabe
- Date of birth: September 24, 1924
- Place of birth: Hiroshima, Hiroshima, Japan
- Date of death: October 12, 2011 (aged 87)
- Place of death: Hiroshima, Hiroshima, Japan
- Position: Goalkeeper

Youth career
- Hiroshima Daiichi High School
- Kokugakuin University

Senior career*
Years	Team	Apps	(Gls)
- Chugoku Electric Power

International career
1954	Japan	2	(0)
- * Club domestic league appearances and goals

Hidemaro Watanabe (渡部 英麿, Watanabe Hidemaro; September 24, 1924 – October 12, 2011) was a Japanese football player. He played for Japan national team.

== Club career ==
Watanabe was born in Hiroshima on September 24, 1924. After graduating from Kokugakuin University, he played for Chugoku Electric Power.

== National team career ==
In March 1954, Watanabe was selected Japan national team for 1954 World Cup qualification. At this qualification, on March 14, he debuted against South Korea. He also played at 1954 Asian Games. He played 2 games for Japan in 1954.

On October 12, 2011, Watanabe died of pancreatic cancer in Hiroshima at the age of 87.

== National team statistics ==
Japan national team
Year	Apps	Goals
1954	2	0
Total	2	0
