= 1949 Emperor's Cup =

Tournament details
- Country: Japan

Final positions
- Champions: University of Tokyo LB
- Runners-up: Kandai Club
- Semifinalists: Toyo Industries; Nittetsu Futase

Statistics of Emperor's Cup in the 1949 season.

== Overview ==
It was contested by 5 teams, and University of Tokyo LB won the championship.

== Results ==
=== Quarterfinals ===
- Kandai Club 5–2 Aisho Club

=== Semifinals ===
- University of Tokyo LB 7–1 Toyo Industries
- Nittetsu Futase 0–4 Kandai Club

=== Final ===
- University of Tokyo LB 5–2 Kandai Club

University of Tokyo LB won the championship.
