= Abolfazl Solbi =

Iranian basketball player (1924–2020)

Personal information
- Nationality: Iranian
- Born: 28 November 1924
- Died: 26 April 2020 (aged 95); Tehran, Iran

Sport
- Sport: Basketball

Abolfazl Solbi (Persian: ابوالفضل صلبی, 28 November 1924 – 26 April 2020) sometimes known as Abolfazl Salabi was an Iranian basketball player. He competed in the men's tournament at the 1948 Summer Olympics.
