= Mostafa Salimi =

Iranian footballer & manager (1904–1994)

Personal information
- Full name: Mostafa Salimi
- Date of birth: February 12, 1904
- Place of birth: Lahijan, Iran
- Date of death: February 13, 1994 (aged 90)
- Place of death: Lahijan, Iran
- Position: Forward

Senior career*
| Years | Team | Apps | (Gls) |
| 1924–1940 | Ferdowsi Club | | |

Managerial career
- 1941–1951: Iran (Assistant)
- 1951–1952: Iran
- * Club domestic league appearances and goals

Mostafa Salimi (12 February 1904 – 13 February 1994) was an Iranian football player and manager. He was head coach of Iran national football team from 1951 to 1952 after served as assistant coach of the national team for more than ten years. He was President of Football Federation of Iran from 1955 to 1956.
