= Aref Gholizadeh =

Iranian footballer (1932-2015)

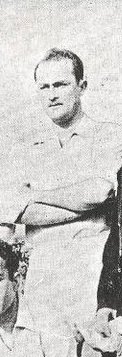

Personal information
- Full name: Aref Gholizadeh
- Date of birth: 1932 2 May
- Place of birth: Tabriz, Iran
- Date of death: 14 April 2015 (aged 83)
- Place of death: Tehran, Iran
- Position: Defender

Senior career*
Years	Team	Apps	(Gls)
1950–1963	Docharkhe Savaran / Taj		

International career
1951–1962	Iran	9	(0)
- * Club domestic league appearances and goals

Aref Gholizadeh (Persian: عارف قلی‌زاده, romanized: 'Âref Qolizâde, born in Tabriz, Iran), was a former Iranian football player. He played for Iran national football team in 1951 Asian Games and 1958 Asian Games.

He died in April 2015.

== Club career ==
He previously played for the Taj until 1962.

== Honours ==
Iran

- Asian Games Silver medal: 1951
