= Hossein Fekri =

Iranian footballer and coach

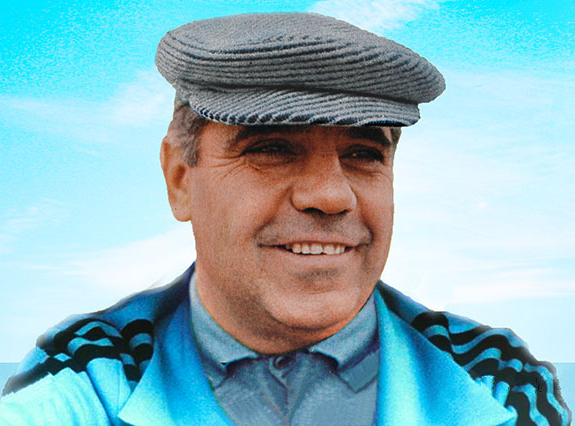

Personal information
- Full name: Hossein Fekri
- Date of birth: March 15, 1924
- Place of birth: Tehran, Iran
- Date of death: July 1, 2003 (aged 79)
- Place of death: Tehran, Iran
- Position: Midfielder

Senior career*
Years	Team	Apps	(Gls)
1939–1943	Daraei		
1943–1944	Shahin		
1944–1953	Tehranjavan		

International career
1951	Iran	2	(0)

Managerial career
- 1953–1961: Tehranjavan
- 1961–1966: Iran
- 1970–1971: Persepolis
- 1971–1975: Oghab
- 1975–1977: Tractor
- 1980–1995: Machine Sazi
- 1995–1996: Aboomoslem
- 1998: Payam
- 1999–2000: Adonis Mashhad
- * Club domestic league appearances and goals

Hossein Fekri (Persian: حسین فکری, March 15, 1924 – July 1, 2003) was an Iranian football player and coach for the Iran national football team. As an international player he won a silver medal at the 1951 Asian Games. At the club level he competed for Daraei and Shahin and then established Tehranjavan. He is third manager in the history of Persepolis, and managed football teams until he was 77 years old.

Fekri had two brothers, Hassan and Mohammad, and five sons, Saeed, Masoud, Hamid, Pirouz and Iran; Masoud played football at the national level.

== Honours ==
Iran

- Asian Games Silver medal: 1951
