= Mahmoud Bayati =

Iranian footballer and manager (1928–2022)

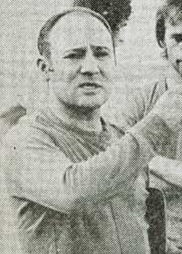

Personal information
- Date of birth: 22 March 1928
- Place of birth: Tehran, Iran
- Date of death: 2 December 2022 (aged 94)
- Position: Forward

Youth career
- 1946–1949: Taj SC

Senior career*
| Years | Team | Apps | (Gls) |
| 1949–1960 | Taj | | |

International career
| 1949–1951 | Iran Olympics | | |
| 1950–1959 | Iran | 7 | (0) |

Managerial career
- 1966–1967: Taj
- 1967–1969: Iran
- 1972–1974: Iran
Medal record
Men's football
Representing Iran (as manager)
AFC Asian Cup
| Winner | 1968 Iran |
- * Club domestic league appearances and goals

Mahmoud Bayati (Persian: محمود بیاتی; 22 March 1928 – 2 December 2022) was an Iranian football player and coach.

== Early life ==
Bayati was born on 22 March 1928 in Tehran. He was a member and captain of Tehran Students Team when he was a student. He was also a member of Tehran Youth team.

== Playing career ==
Bayati signed a contract with Taj in 1946 and played for senior squad from 1949. He was one of the best players during this time and was invited to the Iran national team in 1950. He retired from international career in 1959 and a year later, he also retired from club career.

== Coaching career ==
Six years after retirement from his club career, Bayati was named as Taj's head coach in 1966. After good results with the team, he was appointed head coach of the Iran national team in 1967 and led the team in the 1968 AFC Asian Cup in which Iran won the title without any loss or draw. He resigned after the tournaments in protest to the then President of Iran Football Federation and was succeeded by Zdravko Rajkov. He returned to the national team after four years and was re-appointed head coach in 1972 after the resignation of Mohammad Ranjbar. Bayati led the team in the 1972 Summer Olympics with bad results and was unable to be qualified to the 1974 FIFA World Cup. He was sacked as national football team head coach in 1974.

== Personal life and death ==
Bayati died on 2 December 2022, at the age of 94.

== Honours ==
=== Player ===
Taj

- Tehran Provincial League: 1955–56, 1957–58, 1959–60; runner-up: 1950–51, 1956–57

Iran

- Asian Games Silver medal: 1951

=== Manager ===
Iran

- AFC Asian Cup: 1968
