= Mansour Hajian =

Iranian footballer

Personal information
- Full name: Mansour Hajian
- Place of birth: Iran
- Position: Midfielder

Senior career*
Years	Team	Apps	(Gls)
- Daraei
1948–1951	Shahin FC		
1951–1952	Taj SC		

International career
1947–1951	Iran	6	(0)
- * Club domestic league appearances and goals as of 27 May 2013

Mansour Hajian (Persian: منصور حاجیان, is a former Iranian football player. He played for Iran national football team in 1951 Asian Games.

== Club career ==
He previously played for the Daraei and Shahin and Taj.

== Honours ==
Iran

- Asian Games Silver medal: 1951
