= George Markarian =

Iranian footballer

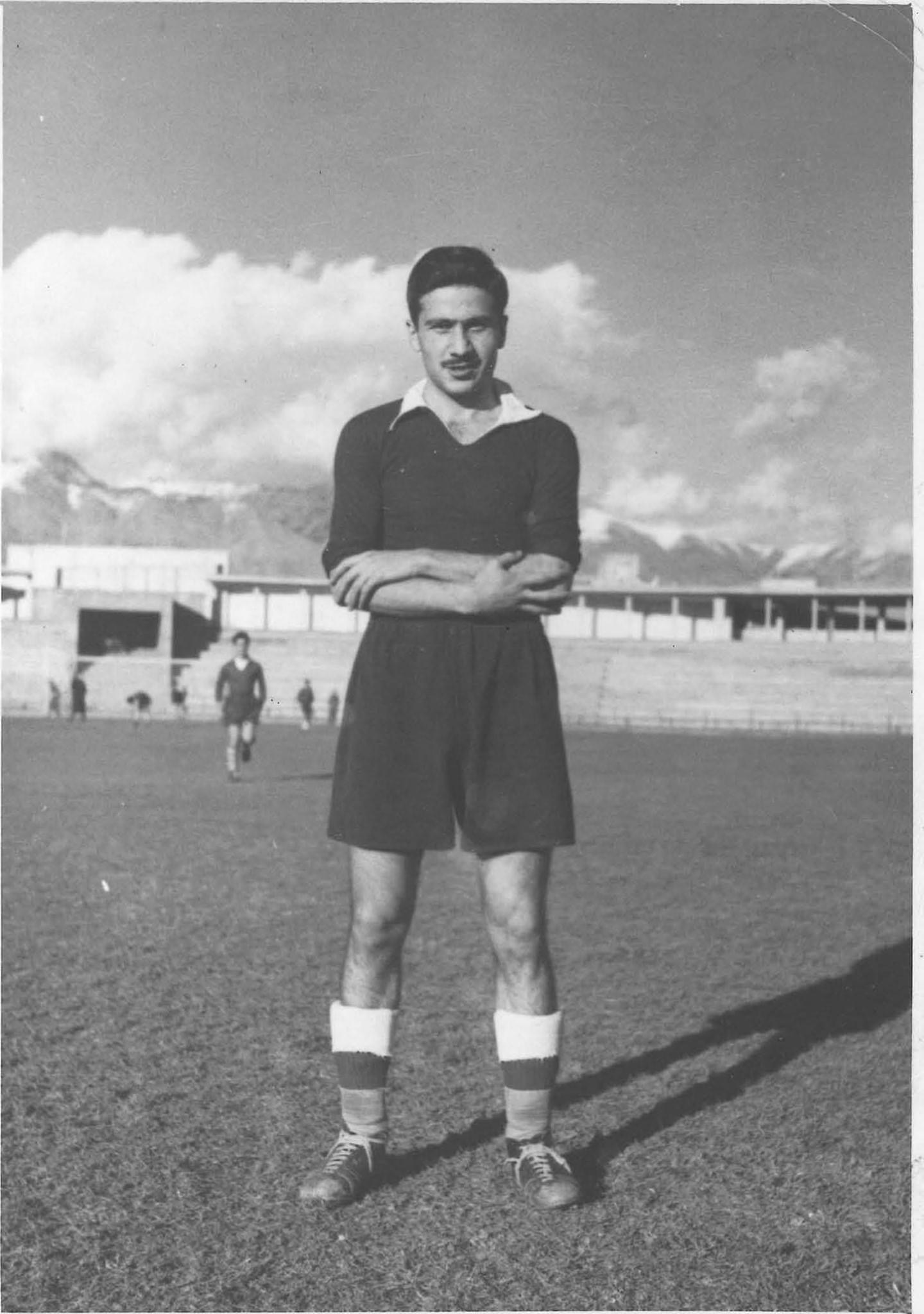

Personal information
- Full name: George Markarian
- Place of birth: Iran

Senior career*
Years	Team	Apps	(Gls)
–1952	Docharkheh Savaran / Taj		

International career
1951	Iran	4	(0)
- * Club domestic league appearances and goals as of 27 May 2013

George Markarian (Persian: ژرژ مارکاریان), is a former Iranian football player. He played for Iran national football team in 1951 Asian Games As captain of the national team he led the 1951 Iranian squad to a silver medal in the Asia Olympic Games (Asian Cup). He was also the premier center forward for the top club team in Iran called Taj. This team annually finished number one in the Iranian league while he was a member. He played alongside other Iranian greats like Khatemi, Boyuk Jedikar, and Mahmoud Bayati.

== Club career ==
He previously played for Docharkheh Savaran and Taj until 1952.

== Honours ==
Iran

- Asian Games Silver medal: 1951
