= Mohsen Azad =

Iranian footballer

Personal information
- Full name: Mohsen Azad
- Place of birth: Iran
- Position: Midfielder

Senior career*
Years	Team	Apps	(Gls)
1950–1951	Shahin FC		
1951–1952	Taj SC		

International career
1951–1952	Iran	6	(0)
- * Club domestic league appearances and goals as of 27 May 2013

Mohsen Azad (Persian: محسن آزاد), is a former Iranian football player. He played for the Iran national football team at the 1951 Asian Games.

== Club career ==
He previously played for the Shahin from 1950 to 1951 and Taj from 1951 to 1952.

== Honours ==
Iran

- Asian Games Silver medal: 1951
