= Hossein Soroudi =

Iranian footballer (died 1992)

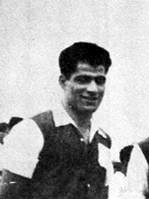
- before 1970

Personal information
- Full name: Hossein Soroudi
- Date of birth: 1925
- Place of birth: Iran
- Date of death: October 1991 (aged 65–66)
- Place of death: Tehran/Iran
- Position: Defender

Senior career*
Years	Team	Apps	(Gls)
1951–1954	Taj SC		
1954–1955	Nirooye Havaei		

International career
1951–1952	Iran	4	(0)
- * Club domestic league appearances and goals as of 27 May 2013

Hossein Soroudi (Persian: حسین سرودی; died 1992) was an Iranian football and basketball player. He played for Iran national football team in 1951 Asian Games. He also competed in the men's basketball tournament at the 1948 Summer Olympics. Soroudi died in 1992.

== Club career ==
Soroudi previously played for the Taj from 1951 to 1954 and Nirooye Havaei from 1954 to 1955.

== Honours ==
Iran

- Asian Games Silver medal: 1951
