= Mahmoud Shakibi =

Iranian footballer (1922–2021)

Personal information
- Full name: Mahmoud Shakibi
- Date of birth: 1922
- Place of birth: Tehran, Persia
- Date of death: 12 July 2021 (aged 98–99)
- Place of death: Tehran
- Position: Defender

Senior career*
Years	Team	Apps	(Gls)
1943–1947	Shahbaz F.C.		
1948–1959	Shahin F.C.		

International career
1950–1952	Iran	6	(1)
- * Club domestic league appearances and goals

Mahmoud Shakibi (1922 – 12 July 2021) was an Iranian footballer who played for the Iran national team and Shahin F.C. in the 1940s and 1950s.

== Club career ==
As a student of Firouz Bahram High School located in Tehran, Shakibi was discovered by Abbas Ekrami his physics and Physical Education teacher. Dr. Ekrami was the founder of Shahin Football Family of Clubs, i.e. Shahbaz F.C., Shahin F.C., Oghab F.C., etc. In 1943, Shakibi joined Shahbaz F.C. He then joined Shahin F.C. in 1948 and enjoyed 11 years of playing for that club.

== International career ==
Shakibi scored one goal for the Iran national team in a match against the Pakistan national football team on 27 October 1950 in a friendly match in Tehran that ended 5–1 for Iran.

He also participated in the 1951 Asian Games.

== Honours ==
Shahin FC

- Iranian Hazfi Cup: 1948, 1949, 1950; runner-up 1953, 1957, 1959
- Tehran Football League: 1951, 1958; runner-up 1947, 1949, 1956

Iran

- Asian Games Silver medal: 1951
