= Masanori Tokita =

Japanese footballer

Masanori Tokita 鴇田 正憲
Personal information
- Full name: Masanori Tokita
- Date of birth: June 24, 1925
- Place of birth: Kobe, Hyogo, Empire of Japan
- Date of death: March 5, 2004 (aged 78)
- Place of death: Hyogo, Japan
- Position: Forward

Youth career
- 1938–1943: Kobe Daiichi High School
- 1944–1949: Kwansei Gakuin University

Senior career*
Years	Team	Apps	(Gls)
1950–1959	Tanabe Pharmaceutical		

International career
1951–1959	Japan	12	(2)
Medal record
All Kwangaku
Winner	Emperor's Cup	1950
Winner	Emperor's Cup	1953
Winner	Emperor's Cup	1955
Kwangaku Club
Winner	Emperor's Cup	1959
Representing Japan
Asian Games
Bronze medal – third place	1951 New Delhi	Team
- * Club domestic league appearances and goals

Masanori Tokita (Japanese 鴇田 正憲, Tokita Masanori; June 24, 1925 – March 5, 2004) was a Japanese football player. He played for the Japan national team.

== Youth career ==
Tokita joined the Kobe Daiich High School team in 1938 and was a member of teams who won Hyogo Prefecture Tournament in 1941 and 1944. The team also won the Meiji Jingu Tournament two years in a row in 1941, and 1942, and the inaugural Kashihara Jingu tournament in 1942. In 1943, his final year at the school, he played as captain of the school team.

Tokita joined the Kwansei Gakuin University team in 1944. There was some disruption during this period, with the club being suspended in 1944 due to wartime conditions. In 1945 Tokita joined the army, where he served until the end of the war in 1945. When the team was reinstated in 1946, after the end of the war, Tokita belonged to the team which won the 1946 Student National Football Club tournament, which they also won in 1948. The team also won two consecutive Kansai Student League championships in 1946 and 1947.

== Club career ==
After graduating from Kwansei Gakuin University, he joined Tanabe Pharmaceutical in 1950. He retired from club soccer in 1959. While playing for the Tanabe Pharmaceuticals team, he also played for the amateur Kwangaku Club, which consisted of players belonging to his alma mater Kwansei Gakuin University - both current University student players and graduates. He won the Emperor's Cup 4 times as a member of the Kwangaku Club, in 1950, 1953, 1955 and 1959.

The Tanabe Pharmaceuticals team won the All Japan Business Group Championship for 7 consecutive years, between 1950, the year Tanabe joined the team, and 1956. They also won the All Japan Championship 4 times.

Upon his retirement, Tanabe held an unbeaten record in official career games in the Kansai Business Group competition, with 94 wins and one draw.

== National team career ==
In March 1951, Tokita was selected for the Japan national team for the Japanese team’s first international game since the end of World War II, at the 1951 Asian Games. At this competition, on March 7, he debuted against Iran. He also played at the 1954 Asian Games. In November 1956, he was selected for Japan for the 1956 Summer Olympics where he played as captain. He played 12 games and scored 2 goals for Japan between 1951 and 1959.

On March 5, 2004, Tokita died of esophageal cancer in Hyogo Prefecture at the age of 78. In 2006, he was selected for the Japan Football Hall of Fame.

== National team statistics ==
Japan national team
Year	Apps	Goals
1951	3	1
1952	0	0
1953	0	0
1954	3	1
1955	1	0
1956	2	0
1957	0	0
1958	0	0
1959	3	0
Total	12	2

== Post-football career ==
After finishing football, Tokita served at Tanabe Pharmaceuticals as director of the Niigata branch office, Sapporo branch manager, and head office director. In 1986 he joined Okayama’s Ryoko Pharmaceuticals as president, and in 1990 became chairman of Sankei Co. Ltd.

== Honours ==
Japan

- Asian Games Bronze medal: 1951

Individual

- Japan Football Hall of Fame: Inducted in 2006
