= Nader Afshar Alavinejad =

Iranian footballer

Nader Afshar
Personal information
- Full name: Nader Afshar Alavinejad Aromi
- Place of birth: Iran
- Position: Defender

Senior career*
Years	Team	Apps	(Gls)
–1952	Taj		

International career
1950–1958	Iran	8	(1)
- * Club domestic league appearances and goals as of 27 May 2013

Nader Afshar Alavinejad Aromi (Persian: نادر افشارعلوی‌نژاد ارومی) is a former Iranian football player. He played for the Iran national football team in the 1951 Asian Games and the 1958 Asian Games.

He previously played for the Docharkheh Savaran and Taj until 1952.

== Honours ==
Iran

- Asian Games Silver medal: 1951
