= Masoud Boroumand =

Iranian footballer (1928–2011)

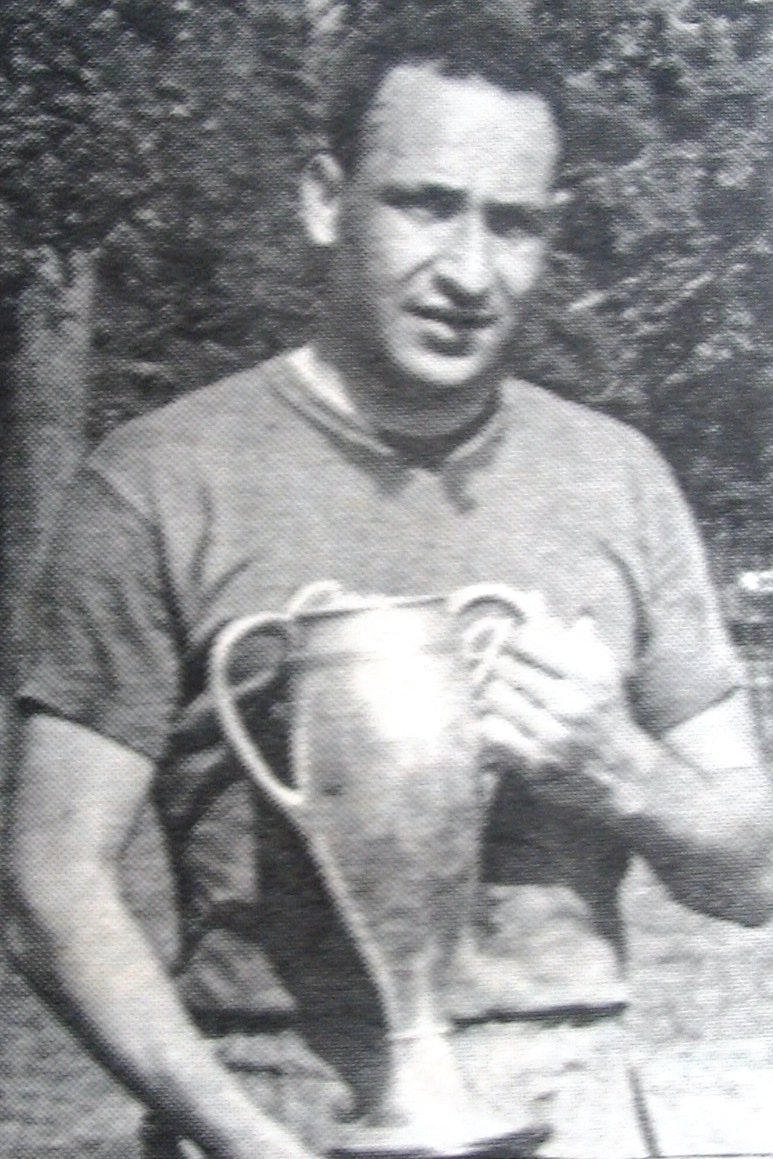
- Boroumand with Shahin in 1958

Personal information
- Full name: Amir Masoud Boroumand
- Date of birth: 12 November 1928
- Place of birth: Tehran, Iran
- Date of death: 8 March 2011 (aged 82)
- Place of death: Tehran, Iran
- Position: Striker

College career
Years	Team	Apps	(Gls)
1958	Washington University Bears		

Senior career*
Years	Team	Apps	(Gls)
1945	Shahbaz		
1946–1957	Shahin		
1962–1963	Shahin		

International career
1947–1958	Iran	11	(7)
- * Club domestic league appearances and goals

Amir Masoud Boroumand (Persian: امیرمسعود برومند; 12 November 1928 – 8 March 2011) was an Iranian footballer who played as a striker. He was the Iran national team's captain during the 1950s.

== Club career ==
In 1945, Boroumand he started his club career with Shahbaz, the third team of Shahin. The following year, he became a reserve player for Shahin, before becoming a starter in 1947. He stayed at the club until 1958.

Whilst studying for a PhD at Washington University in the United States, he played for the university's football team, the Washington University Bears, and won the double 1958 Eastern USA Soccer League and Eastern USA Soccer Cup.

Boroumand played football whilst studying at the American University of Beirut in Lebanon, between 1959 and 1961, and became known as "the Iranian Prince" (Arabic: امیر الایرانی).

== International career ==
=== Iran ===
Boroumand won his first cap for the Iran national team on 26 October 1947, in a friendly match played in Tehran between Iran and Turkey. He scored Iran's only goal in that match when Iran lost 3–1. Boroumand scored a hat-trick against Pakistan on their international debut on 27 October 1950. Boroumand also captained the Iran national football team during the 1950s. He participated in the 1951 and 1958 Asian Games.

=== Lebanon ===
Some Iranian sources, such as Tarafdari, claim that Boroumand played several matches for the Lebanon national team while studying in Beirut, including a 3–2 loss against Yugoslavia in which he allegedly scored twice. However, contemporary match reports only record a 3–2 defeat of the Lebanese club Homenetmen to Yugoslav club NK Rijeka on 5 February 1961, and no evidence exists of a Lebanon national team fixture against Yugoslavia during this period.

== Personal life ==
Boroumand studied at the University of Tehran, holding a bachelor in judicial law and a PhD. In 1958 Boroumand studied for a PhD in administrative management at Washington University, in the United States. Between 1959 and 1961 Boroumand lived in Lebanon, and majored in management at the American University of Beirut, holding a bachelor's and master's degree. He had been part of Board of Directors of Shahin, from 1984 until his death in 2011.

On 8 March 2011, Boroumand was taken to a hospital in Tehran, Iran, due to a lung infection and myocardial infarction, where he died. He was laid to rest at the Behesht-e Zahra cemetery in Tehran.

== Career statistics ==
=== International ===
Scores and results list Iran's goal tally first, score column indicates score after each Boroumand goal.

List of international goals scored by Masoud Boroumand
No.	Date	Venue	Opponent	Result	Competition
1	26 October 1947	Tehran, Iran	Turkey	1–3	Friendly
2	28 October 1948	Tehran, Iran	Turkey	1–1	Friendly
3	30 May 1950	Istanbul, Turkey	Turkey	2–2	Friendly
4	26 October 1950	Tehran, Iran	Afghanistan	4–0	Friendly
5	26 October 1950	Tehran, Iran	Afghanistan	4–0	Friendly
6	27 October 1950	Tehran, Iran	Pakistan	5–1	Friendly
7	9 March 1951	New Delhi, India	Japan	3–2	1951 Asian Games

== Honours ==
Shahin FC

- Tehran Hazfi Cup: 1948, 1949, 1950; runner-up: 1953, 1957
- Tehran Football League runner-up: 1947, 1949, 1951, 1956

Washington University Bears

- Eastern USA Soccer League: 1958
- Eastern USA Soccer Cup: 1958

Iran

- Asian Games Silver medal: 1951
