= Mehdi Masoud-Ansari =

Iranian footballer

Personal information
- Full name: Mehdi-Gholi Masoud-Ansari
- Place of birth: Iran
- Date of death: 22 March 1978
- Position: Striker

Senior career*
Years	Team	Apps	(Gls)
1948–1951	Shahin FC		
1951–1952	Taj SC		

International career
1951–1952	Iran	4	(2)
- * Club domestic league appearances and goals as of 27 May 2013

Mehdi-Gholi Masoud-Ansari (Persian: مهدی‌قلی مسعودانصاری, is a former Iranian football player. He played for Iran national football team in 1951 Asian Games.

== Club career ==
He previously played for the Shahin from 1948 to 1951 and Taj from 1951 to 1952.

== Honours ==
Iran

- Asian Games Silver medal: 1951
