= Parviz Koozehkanani =

Iranian footballer (1929–2025)

Parviz Kouzehkanani
Personal information
- Date of birth: 1 July 1929
- Place of birth: Tehran, Persia
- Date of death: 5 August 2025 (aged 96)
- Place of death: Los Angeles, California, U.S.
- Height: 1.83 m (6 ft 0 in)
- Positions: Winger; forward

Senior career*
Years	Team	Apps	(Gls)
1950–1957	Tâj SC		
1957?	1. FC Köln		
1958?	Bayer Leverkusen		
1962–1965	Tâj SC		

International career
1951–1962	Iran	7	(2)
- * Club domestic league appearances and goals

Parviz Koozehkanani (Persian: پرویز کوزه کنانی; 1 July 1929 – 5 August 2025) was an Iranian footballer. He played for Tâj SC in Iran and also had brief stints with 1. FC Köln and Bayer Leverkusen in Germany. He played for the Iran national football team from 1951 to 1962 and helped them win the silver medal at the 1951 Asian Games. He later worked as a coach, including for Tâj, before moving to the United States, where he spent his last years.

== Biography ==
Koozehkanani was born on 1 July 1929 in Tehran, Persia. He became interested in football due to his brother, Mahmoud, who was a fan of the sport. He grew up competing in football, basketball and athletics and played those sports while attending Hakim Nezami High School. He later attended Iranshahr High School where he played football. There, he played with two members of the Tâj SC youth club, and he later joined the youth club himself. In 1947, he served as captain of their junior squad.

Koozehkanani made the senior squad for Tâj in 1950 and spent almost the entirety of his career there. He played as a striker and was one of their top players during his career, serving as captain during several seasons while leading the Tehran Football League in scoring three times. With the club, he participated in their first international tour, to Afghanistan, in Solar Hijri year 1329 (1950/1951 Gregorian) and later participated in a series of friendlies against Russian teams in 1956, scoring the game-winning goal in one of them. He won league championships in 1952, 1956 and 1957 and helped his club win the league cup tournament in 1950.

In the mid-1950s, Koozehkanani was visited by an Austrian coach who subsequently recommended him to a friend working at the club Real Madrid in Spain. The coach said of Koozehkanani: "If you recruit this Iranian player and monitor him for a year, I promise you that he will become one of the regular players of the Real Madrid team". In 1957, he left Iran for Germany, joining the club 1. FC Köln while studying at a university. After playing a season with them, he moved to Bayer Leverkusen in 1958. However, while at Leverkusen, he was called up to the Iran national team for a friendly against an English team and afterwards did not return to Germany. Koozehkanani was still under contract and thus was fined 4,500 German Marks by his club for leaving, and then had his contract terminated. Afterwards, he returned to Tâj and played until 1965 with them, retiring due to a knee injury.

Koozehkanani was a member of the national football team for 12 years. He helped them win the silver medal at the 1951 Asian Games in New Delhi and also participated at the 1958 Asian Games. He is recorded as having played seven FIFA-sanctioned matches for the national team from 1951 to 1962, scoring two goals. After his retirement as a player, he served as a coach, working for Tâj for eight years and helping them win the 1970 Asian Champion Club Tournament. He later moved to the United States, dying in Los Angeles on 5 August 2025, at the age of 96, from cardiac arrest.

== Honours ==
Iran

- Asian Games Silver medal: 1951
