= Major Dhyan Chand National Stadium =

Field Hockey stadium, New Delhi, India

- National Stadium
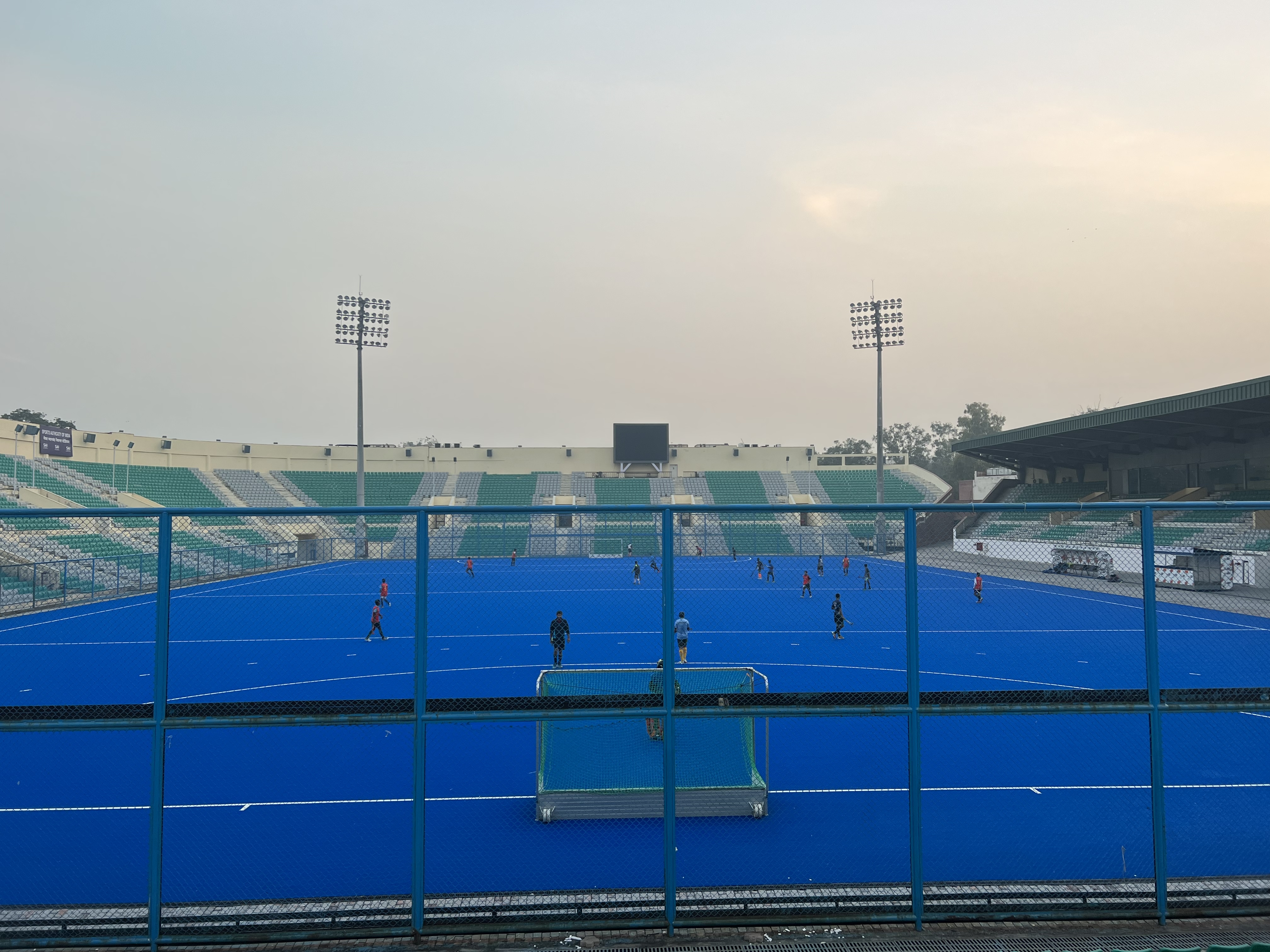
- The stadium in 2021
- Interactive map of Major Dhyan Chand National Stadium
- Full name: Major Dhyan Chand National Stadium
- Former names: Irwin Amphitheatre; National Stadium
- Location: New Delhi, India
- Coordinates: 28°36′45″N 77°14′14″E
- Owner: Sports Authority of India
- Operator: Sports Authority of India
- Capacity: 16,200

Construction
- Opened: 1933
- Rebuilt: 2010

Tenants
- India men's national field hockey team Delhi SG Pipers (2024–present); Delhi Wave Riders (2013–2016); Delhi Wizards (2011)

The Major Dhyan Chand National Stadium, commonly known by its former name National Stadium, is a field hockey stadium in New Delhi, India. The stadium is named after former Indian field hockey player, Dhyan Chand. It served as the venue for the 1st Asian Games in 1951.

== History ==
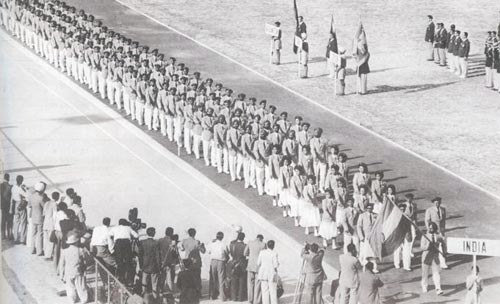
Indian athletes at the first Asiad

The stadium was built in 1933 as a gift for Delhi from the Maharaja of Bhavnagar. It was originally a multipurpose stadium named the Irwin Amphitheatre. It was designed by Anthony S. DeMillo and opened by Lord Willingdon. As per the original plans of architect of New Delhi Edwin Lutyens, there was to be a garden at the site, to provide a clear view of the historic Purana Quila (Old Fort) in the backdrop, as it lay perpendicular to the axis beginning from Rashtrapati Bhavan (President's House) through Rajpath and ending at the India Gate. His plans were however overruled. It was renamed National Stadium before the 1951 Asian Games, Dhyan Chand's name was added in 2002.

== Major renovations ==
The Dhyan Chand Stadium was the host venue for the 2010 Men's Hockey World Cup. It was also the field hockey venue of the 2010 Commonwealth Games. The stadium underwent a major reconstruction project before the Hockey World Cup 2010.

On 24 January 2010 it became the first venue for the 2010 Commonwealth Games to be unveiled. The stadium was revamped at a cost of ₹262 crore, ₹50 crore more than originally budgeted. The stands, which were earthen embankments, were demolished and a new rectangular seating bowl was constructed in its place.

From 8–10 December 2017 it hosted the fourth edition of Jashn-e-Rekhta, the Urdu festival of India by Rekhta Foundation led by Rajiv Saraf.

== Stadium features ==
The stadium is spread over 17,500 square metres in the 150,000-square-metre (37-acre) complex. It has three synthetic pitches — two conform to international standards and a third is for practice. It is located adjacent to the Indian Coast Guard Headquarters. A new polygrass turf was laid on all pitches equipped with new sprinkler systems. The main field has a capacity to seat about 16,200 spectators. The second pitch outside the main arena has 900 permanent seats and with a provision of 1,600 temporary seats. The two competitive pitches are flood-lit with foldable floodlight towers (hinged mast lights) which will provide 2,200 lux illumination during the competition. This will enable high definition TV transmission.

Both the pitches are equipped with facilities for the players like change rooms, relaxation lounges and a VVIP lounge.

The stadium is air-conditioned and fitted with lifts. There are barrier free provisions for athletes and spectators who are physically challenged. The stadium will get its power supply from two grids with a backup based on generator sets and battery uninterrupted power supply.
