= Japan national football team results (1950–1959) =

This article lists the results for the Japan national football team between 1950 and 1959.

== 1951 ==
Date	Opponent	Result	Score	Venue	Competition	Ref
7 March 1951	Iran	D	0–0	National Stadium, New Delhi, India	1951 Asian Games Football	
8 March 1951	Iran	L	2–3	National Stadium, New Delhi, India	1951 Asian Games Football	
9 March 1951	Afghanistan	W	2–0	National Stadium, New Delhi, India	1951 Asian Games Football	

== 1954 ==
Date	Opponent	Result	Score	Venue	Competition	Ref
7 March 1954	South Korea	L	1–5	Meiji Jingu Gaien Stadium, Tokyo, Japan	1954 FIFA World Cup qualification (AFC – Group 13)	
14 March 1954	South Korea	D	2–2	Meiji Jingu Gaien Stadium, Tokyo, Japan	1954 FIFA World Cup qualification (AFC – Group 13)	
1 May 1954	Indonesia	L	3–5	Rizal Memorial Stadium, Manila, Philippines	1954 Asian Games Football	
3 May 1954	India	L	2–3	Rizal Memorial Stadium, Manila, Philippines	1954 Asian Games Football	

== 1955 ==
Date	Opponent	Result	Score	Venue	Competition	Ref
2 January 1955	Burma	D	1–1^{1}	(Myanmar) Rangoon, Burma	International Friendly	
5 January 1955	Burma	L	0–3^{1}	(Myanmar) Rangoon, Burma	International Friendly	
8 January 1955	Burma	D	1–1^{1}	(Myanmar) Rangoon, Burma	International Friendly	
11 January 1955	Burma	W	1–0^{1}	(Myanmar) Rangoon, Burma	International Friendly	
9 October 1955	Burma	D	0–0	Korakuen Velodrome, Tokyo, Japan	International Friendly	
1:Not recognized

== 1956 ==
Date	Opponent	Result	Score	Venue	Competition	Ref
3 June 1956	South Korea	W	2–0	Korakuen Velodrome, Tokyo, Japan	1956 Olympic Games Qualification	
10 June 1956	South Korea	L	0–2	Korakuen Velodrome, Tokyo, Japan	1956 Olympic Games Qualification	
20 November 1956	(Socialist Federal Republic of Yugoslavia) Yugoslavia Olympic football team	L	2–7^{1}	Melbourne, Australia	International Friendly	
27 November 1956	Australia	L	0–2	Olympic Park, Melbourne, Australia	1956 Olympic Games Football	
1:Not recognized by FIFA, because at that time, countries from UEFA didn't include professional players in Olympic teams.

== 1958 ==
Date	Opponent	Result	Score	Venue	Competition	Ref
26 May 1958	Philippines	L	0–1	Tokyo Metropolitan Stadium, Tokyo, Japan	1958 Asian Games Football	
28 May 1958	Hong Kong	L	0–2	National Stadium, Tokyo, Japan	1958 Asian Games Football	
25 December 1958	Hong Kong	L	2–5	Hong Kong	International Friendly	
28 December 1958	Malaya	L	2–6	(Federation of Malaya) Kuala Lumpur, Malaya	International Friendly	

== 1959 ==
Date	Opponent	Result	Score	Venue	Competition	Ref
4 January 1959	Malaya	W	3–1	(Federation of Malaya) George Town, Malaya	International Friendly	
10 January 1959	Singapore	W	4–3	Singapore	International Friendly	
11 January 1959	Singapore	L	2–3	Singapore	International Friendly	
31 August 1959	Hong Kong	D	1–1	(Federation of Malaya) Kuala Lumpur, Malaya	Merdeka Tournament	
2 September 1959	Hong Kong	L	2–4	(Federation of Malaya) Kuala Lumpur, Malaya	Merdeka Tournament	
3 September 1959	Singapore	W	4–1	(Federation of Malaya) Kuala Lumpur, Malaya	Merdeka Tournament	
5 September 1959	South Korea	D	0–0	(Federation of Malaya) Kuala Lumpur, Malaya	Merdeka Tournament	
6 September 1959	South Korea	L	1–3	(Federation of Malaya) Kuala Lumpur, Malaya	Merdeka Tournament	
13 December 1959	South Korea	L	0–2^{1}	Korakuen Velodrome, Tokyo, Japan	1960 Olympic Games Qualification	
20 December 1959	South Korea	W	1–0^{1}	Korakuen Velodrome, Tokyo, Japan	1960 Olympic Games Qualification	
1:Not recognized by FIFA.
