= Football at the 1951 Asian Games =

- Venue: National Stadium
- Date: 5–10 March
- Nations: 6

Medalists
gold medal	India
silver medal	Iran
bronze medal	Japan

Football was contested as part of the programme for the 1951 Asian Games which was hosted in New Delhi, India from 4 to 11 March 1951. It was the inaugural edition of the men's football tournament at the multi-sport event organised by the Asian Games Federation.

The football tournament began with the quarter-final matches on 5 March 1951 and ended with the gold medal match on 10 March 1951. Hosts India and Iran contested the final. Sheoo Mewalal scored the only goal of the match as India defeated Iran 1–0 to win the gold medal. In the bronze medal match, Japan defeated Afghanistan 2–0.

== Background ==
The first edition of the Asian Games was held in New Delhi, India.

== Format ==
Matches lasted only 60 minutes and were played on narrower pitches than were typically allowed by international regulations. Extra time, if required, would last 15 minutes. The Fédération Internationale de Football Association (FIFA) was notified in advance and sanctioned the tournament.

The competition was played as a single-elimination tournament. Four of the six teams were drawn to contest the two quarter-final ties and the other two teams received a bye. The winners of the quarter-finals would contest the semi-finals alongside the two teams which received a bye. The winners of the semi-finals then contested the gold medal match and the losers contested the bronze medal match.

=== Participants ===
- Afghanistan
- Burma
- India
- Indonesia
- Iran
- Japan

== Draw ==
The draw for the football tournament was held on 25 February 1951 at a conference chaired by Guru Dutt Sondhi, who headed an executive committee for the purpose, in New Delhi. Japan and Afghanistan received byes in the quarter-finals; the former would play the winner of the Iran vs Burma tie and the latter to play the winner of the India vs Indonesia tie. During the conference, it was announced that the matches would be played in two halves of 30 minutes each with a five-minute interval and that extra time would be two seven-and-a-half-minute halves with a one-minute interval, when a result is not produced in regulation time.

== Quarter-finals ==
Iran defeated Burma and India defeated Indonesia to advance to the semi-finals.

5 March 1951
15:00

Iran	2–0	Burma
Alavinejad 17'; Kouzehkanani 60'

National Stadium, New Delhi

5 March 1951
16:15

India	3–0	Indonesia
Mewalal 27'; Siregar 42' (o.g.); Venkatesh 45'

National Stadium, New Delhi

== Semi-finals ==
India defeated Afghanistan to advance to the gold medal match. Iran and Japan played out a goalless draw after extra time so a replay was organised the following day. A brace from Mehdi Masoud-Ansari helped Iran to a 3–2 win as they advanced to the gold medal match.

7 March 1951
15:00

Iran	0–0 (a.e.t.)	Japan

National Stadium, New Delhi

7 March 1951
16:15

India	3–0	Afghanistan
Venkatesh 10'; Mewalal 16'; Nandy 55'

National Stadium, New Delhi

=== Replay ===
8 March 1951
15:00

Iran	3–2	Japan
Masoud-Ansari 21', 42'; Boroumand 58'		Tokita 40'; Ninomiya 50'

National Stadium, New Delhi

== Bronze medal match ==
Japan defeated Afghanistan 2–0 to win the bronze medal. Both Toshio Iwatani and Masanori Tokita are credited with scoring the first goal.

9 March 1951
17:00

Japan	2–0	Afghanistan
Iwatani 40', 45'

National Stadium, New Delhi

== Gold medal match ==
India defeated Iran to win the gold medal.

10 March 1951
17:00

Iran	0–1	India
		Mewalal 34'

National Stadium, New Delhi

== Goalscorers ==
There were 16 goals scored in 7 matches, for an average of 2.29 goals per match.

3 goals

- (India national football team) Sheoo Mewalal

2 goals

- (India national football team) Pansanttom Venkatesh
- (Iran national football team) Mehdi Masoud-Ansari
- (Japan national football team) Toshio Iwatani

1 goal

- (India national football team) Santosh Nandy
- (Iran national football team) Nader Afshar Alavinejad
- (Iran national football team) Masoud Boroumand
- (Iran national football team) Parviz Kouzehkanani
- (Japan national football team) Hirokazu Ninomiya
- (Japan national football team) Masanori Tokita

1 own goal

- (Indonesia national football team) Chairuddin Siregar
