= 1979 in Japanese football =

1979 season

Japanese football in 1979

== Japan Soccer League ==
=== Division 1 ===
Pos	Team	Pld	W	PKW	PKL	L	GF	GA	GD	Pts	Qualification
1	Fujita Engineering	18	12	1	3	2	36	15	+21	53	Champions
2	Yomiuri	18	10	0	4	4	48	26	+22	44	
3	Hitachi	18	8	5	2	3	23	18	+5	44	
4	Yanmar Diesel	18	9	1	2	6	28	21	+7	40	
5	Furukawa Electric	18	7	5	2	4	28	22	+6	40	
6	Toyo Kogyo	18	5	4	5	4	20	19	+1	33	
7	Mitsubishi Motors	18	5	5	2	6	16	20	−4	32	
8	Nippon Steel	18	6	2	1	9	23	25	−2	29	
9	Nippon Kokan	18	1	1	4	12	17	43	−26	10	To promotion/relegation series
10	Nissan	18	1	2	1	14	9	39	−30	9	To promotion/relegation series

=== Division 2 ===
Pos	Team	Pld	W	PKW	PKL	L	GF	GA	GD	Pts	Qualification
1	Toshiba	18	10	3	2	3	36	23	+13	48	To promotion/relegation series with Division 1
2	Yamaha Motors	18	10	2	3	3	33	19	+14	47	To promotion/relegation series with Division 1
3	Fujitsu	18	11	0	3	4	29	18	+11	47	
4	Honda	18	10	1	2	5	31	25	+6	44	
5	Yanmar Club (Yanmar Diesel B-Team)	18	8	2	0	8	37	30	+7	36	Folded
6	Tanabe Pharmaceuticals	18	7	0	0	11	21	21	0	28	
7	Toyota Motors	18	5	3	2	8	21	29	−8	28	
8	Kofu Club	18	5	2	2	9	26	42	−16	26	
9	Teijin SC Matsuyama	18	5	1	3	9	24	30	−6	25	To promotion/relegation series with Regional Series finalists
10	Sumitomo	18	2	3	0	13	15	36	−21	14	To promotion/relegation series with Regional Series finalists

== Emperor's Cup ==
January 1, 1980

Fujita Industries	2–1	Mitsubishi Motors
? (?) ? (?)		? (?)

National Stadium

== National team ==
=== Results ===
1979.03.04	Japan	2–1	South Korea	Tokyo, Japan
	Usui 21'; Nakamura 26'	JFA	? (?)	Stadium: Tokyo National Stadium

1979.05.31	Japan	4–0	Indonesia	Tokyo, Japan
	62' (o.g.); Ochiai 64'; Nagai 76'; Maeda 79'	JFA		Stadium: Nishigaoka Soccer Stadium

1979.06.16	Japan	1–4	South Korea	Seoul, South Korea
	Nagai 47'	JFA	? (?) ? (?) ? (?) ? (?)

1979.06.27	Japan	1–1	Malaysia	Kuala Lumpur, Malaysia
	Maeda 27'	JFA	? (?)

1979.06.29	Japan	2–1	Thailand	Kuala Lumpur, Malaysia
	1' (o.g.); Usui 39'	JFA	? (?)

1979.07.01	Japan	1–0	Burma	Kuala Lumpur, Malaysia
	Maeda 62'	JFA

1979.07.11	Japan	0–0	Indonesia	Kuala Lumpur, Malaysia
		JFA

1979.07.13	Japan	3–1	Singapore	Kuala Lumpur, Malaysia
	Usui 25'; Y. Watanabe 46'; Nagai 82'	JFA	? (?)

1979.08.23	Japan	0–0	North Korea	Pyongyang, North Korea
		JFA

=== Players statistics ===
Player	-1978	03.04	05.31	06.16	06.27	06.29	07.01	07.11	07.13	08.23	1979	Total
Nobuo Fujishima	62(7)	O	O	-	-	-	-	-	-	O	3(0)	65(7)
Yoshikazu Nagai	58(6)	O	O(1)	O(1)	O	O	O	O	O(1)	O	9(3)	67(9)
Hiroshi Ochiai	49(8)	O	O(1)	O	O	O	O	O	O	O	9(1)	58(9)
Eijun Kiyokumo	28(0)	O	O	O	O	O	O	O	O	O	9(0)	37(0)
Mitsuo Watanabe	22(4)	O	O	O	O	O	O	-	-	-	6(0)	28(4)
Mitsuhisa Taguchi	22(0)	O	O	O	O	O	O	O	O	-	8(0)	30(0)
Hiroyuki Usui	21(7)	O(1)	O	O	O	O(1)	O	O	O(1)	O	9(3)	30(10)
Hideki Maeda	21(3)	O	O(1)	O	O(1)	O	O(1)	O	O	O	9(3)	30(6)
Keizo Imai	16(0)	O	O	O	O	O	O	O	O	O	9(0)	25(0)
Nobutoshi Kaneda	15(1)	-	O	O	-	-	-	-	-	O	3(0)	18(1)
Shigemi Ishii	9(0)	O	-	O	O	O	O	O	-	-	6(0)	15(0)
Hiromi Hara	6(1)	-	-	-	-	-	O	O	-	-	2(0)	8(1)
Haruhisa Hasegawa	4(0)	-	O	-	-	-	-	-	-	-	1(0)	5(0)
Yoshiichi Watanabe	0(0)	-	-	O	O	O	O	O	O(1)	-	6(1)	6(1)
Kazuyoshi Nakamura	0(0)	O(1)	-	O	O	O	O	-	-	-	5(1)	5(1)
Yuji Kishioku	0(0)	-	O	-	O	O	-	-	O	O	5(0)	5(0)
Kozo Tashima	0(0)	-	-	-	O	-	O	O	O	-	4(0)	4(0)
Kazushi Kimura	0(0)	-	O	O	-	-	-	-	-	O	3(0)	3(0)
Katsuyuki Kawachi	0(0)	-	-	O	-	-	-	O	O	-	3(0)	3(0)
Shigeharu Ueki	0(0)	-	-	-	-	-	-	-	O	-	1(0)	1(0)
Michio Yasuda	0(0)	-	-	-	-	-	-	-	-	O	1(0)	1(0)
Shigemitsu Sudo	0(0)	-	-	-	-	-	-	-	-	O	1(0)	1(0)
Mitsuo Kato	0(0)	-	-	-	-	-	-	-	-	O	1(0)	1(0)
Masafumi Yokoyama	0(0)	-	-	-	-	-	-	-	-	O	1(0)	1(0)

== Births ==
- 5 April: Mitsuo Ogasawara
