= 1980 in Japanese football =

1980 season

Japanese football in 1980

== Japan Soccer League ==
=== Division 1 ===
Pos	Team	Pld	W	D	L	GF	GA	GD	Pts	Qualification or relegation
1	Yanmar Diesel	18	13	4	1	29	13	+16	30	Champions
2	Fujita Engineering	18	10	3	5	33	19	+14	23	
3	Furukawa Electric	18	9	4	5	26	21	+5	22	
4	Mitsubishi Motors	18	7	6	5	24	20	+4	20	
5	Hitachi	18	8	3	7	32	28	+4	19	
6	Yomiuri	18	8	1	9	37	29	+8	17	
7	Toyo Kogyo	18	6	3	9	22	26	−4	15	
8	Nippon Steel	18	6	3	9	21	27	−6	15	
9	Yamaha Motors	18	5	3	10	28	39	−11	13	To promotion/relegation Series
10	Nissan	18	2	2	14	11	41	−30	6	Relegated to Second Division

=== Division 2 ===
Pos	Team	Pld	W	D	L	GF	GA	GD	Pts	Promotion or relegation
1	Honda	18	13	2	3	43	17	+26	28	Promoted to First Division
2	Fujitsu	18	10	5	3	45	12	+33	25	To promotion/relegation Series with First Division
3	Toshiba	18	8	6	4	30	17	+13	22	
4	Nippon Kokan	18	7	6	5	23	17	+6	20	
5	Toyota Motors	18	7	4	7	29	34	−5	18	
6	Tanabe Pharmaceuticals	18	6	5	7	15	22	−7	17	
7	Teijin Matsuyama	18	7	3	8	20	24	−4	17	
8	Sumitomo	18	4	5	9	22	33	−11	13	
9	Kofu Club	18	4	2	12	17	33	−16	10	To promotion/relegation Series with Regional Series
10	Daikyo Oil	18	5	0	13	27	46	−19	10	Relegated to Regional Leagues

== Emperor's Cup ==
January 1, 1981

Mitsubishi Motors	1–0	Tanabe Pharmaceutical
? (?)

National Stadium

== National team ==
=== Results ===
1980.03.22	Japan	1–3	South Korea	Kuala Lumpur, Malaysia
	Takahara 89'	JFA	? (?) ? (?) ? (?)

1980.03.24	Japan	10–0	Philippines	Kuala Lumpur, Malaysia
	Yokoyama 8'; Kaneda 21'; Maeda 25'; Kishioku 43', 51'; Usui 44'; Hasegawa 59', 66'; Kimura 82'; Takahara 87'	JFA

1980.03.28	Japan	2–0	Indonesia	Kuala Lumpur, Malaysia
	Maeda 20'; Kimura 87'	JFA

1980.03.30	Japan	1–1	Malaysia	Kuala Lumpur, Malaysia
	Usui 7'	JFA	? (?)

1980.04.02	Japan	2–1	Brunei	Kuala Lumpur, Malaysia
	Yokoyama 13'; Usui 76'	JFA	? (?)

1980.06.09	Japan	3–1	Hong Kong	Guangdong, China PR
	Tashima 5'; Hara 17'; Hasegawa 70'	JFA	? (?)

1980.06.11	Japan	0–1	China PR	Guangdong, China PR
		JFA	? (?)

1980.06.18	Japan	2–0	Hong Kong	Guangdong, China PR
	Hara 51'; Kaneda 64'	JFA

1980.12.22	Japan	1–0	Singapore	Hong Kong
	Kimura 20'	JFA

1980.12.26	Japan	0–1	China PR	Hong Kong
		JFA	? (?)

1980.12.28	Japan	3–0	Macau	Hong Kong
	Kimura 70'; Maeda 80'; Hasegawa 85'	JFA

1980.12.30	Japan	0–1 (a.e.t.)	North Korea	Hong Kong
		JFA	? (?)

=== Players statistics ===
Player	-1979	03.22	03.24	03.28	03.30	04.02	06.09	06.11	06.18	12.22	12.26	12.28	12.30	1980	Total
Yoshikazu Nagai	67(9)	O	-	-	O	-	-	-	-	-	-	-	-	2(0)	69(9)
Hiroshi Ochiai	58(9)	O	O	O	O	O	-	-	-	-	-	-	-	5(0)	63(9)
Eijun Kiyokumo	37(0)	O	O	O	O	O	-	-	-	-	-	-	-	5(0)	42(0)
Hiroyuki Usui	30(10)	O	O(1)	O	O(1)	O(1)	-	-	-	-	-	-	-	5(3)	35(13)
Hideki Maeda	30(6)	O	O(1)	O(1)	O	O	O	O	-	O	O	O(1)	O	11(3)	41(9)
Mitsuhisa Taguchi	30(0)	-	O	O	O	O	-	-	-	-	-	-	-	4(0)	34(0)
Keizo Imai	25(0)	O	-	O	O	O	-	-	-	-	-	-	-	4(0)	29(0)
Tatsuhiko Seta	24(0)	O	-	-	-	-	-	-	-	-	-	-	-	1(0)	25(0)
Nobutoshi Kaneda	18(1)	O	O(1)	O	O	O	O	O	O(1)	O	O	O	O	12(2)	30(3)
Hiromi Hara	8(1)	-	-	-	-	-	O(1)	O	O(1)	-	O	-	O	5(2)	13(3)
Hisashi Kato	5(1)	-	-	-	-	-	O	O	O	-	-	-	-	3(0)	8(1)
Haruhisa Hasegawa	5(0)	-	O(2)	O	-	-	O(1)	O	O	O	O	O(1)	O	9(4)	14(4)
Yuji Kishioku	5(0)	O	O(2)	O	O	O	-	-	-	-	-	-	-	5(2)	10(2)
Kozo Tashima	4(0)	-	-	-	-	-	O(1)	O	O	-	-	-	-	3(1)	7(1)
Kazushi Kimura	3(0)	O	O(1)	O(1)	O	O	-	-	-	O(1)	O	O(1)	O	9(4)	12(4)
Masafumi Yokoyama	1(0)	O	O(1)	O	O	O(1)	O	O	O	O	O	O	O	12(2)	13(2)
Shigemitsu Sudo	1(0)	-	O	-	-	-	O	O	O	O	O	O	O	8(0)	9(0)
Tetsuo Sugamata	1(0)	-	-	-	-	-	O	O	O	O	O	O	O	7(0)	8(0)
Yukitaka Omi	1(0)	O	O	O	O	O	-	-	-	-	-	-	-	5(0)	6(0)
Ikuo Takahara	0(0)	O(1)	O(1)	O	-	O	-	-	-	-	-	-	-	4(2)	4(2)
Shinji Tanaka	0(0)	-	-	-	O	O	-	-	-	-	-	O	O	4(0)	4(0)
Yasuhito Suzuki	0(0)	-	-	-	-	-	-	-	-	O	O	O	O	4(0)	4(0)
Tetsuya Totsuka	0(0)	-	-	-	-	-	-	-	-	O	O	O	O	4(0)	4(0)
Yahiro Kazama	0(0)	-	-	-	-	-	-	-	-	O	O	O	O	4(0)	4(0)
Yoshio Kato	0(0)	-	-	-	-	-	O	O	O	-	-	-	-	3(0)	3(0)
Hiroshi Soejima	0(0)	-	-	-	-	-	O	O	O	-	-	-	-	3(0)	3(0)
Takeshi Okada	0(0)	-	-	-	-	-	O	O	O	-	-	-	-	3(0)	3(0)
Satoshi Tsunami	0(0)	-	-	-	-	-	-	-	-	O	O	O	-	3(0)	3(0)
Takayoshi Yamano	0(0)	-	-	-	-	-	-	O	O	-	-	-	-	2(0)	2(0)
Satoshi Tezuka	0(0)	-	-	-	-	-	-	O	O	-	-	-	-	2(0)	2(0)
Masakuni Yamamoto	0(0)	-	-	-	-	-	-	-	-	-	O	-	O	2(0)	2(0)
Akihiro Nishimura	0(0)	-	-	-	-	-	-	-	O	-	-	-	-	1(0)	1(0)
Takeshi Koshida	0(0)	-	-	-	-	-	-	-	-	O	-	-	-	1(0)	1(0)
Hiroyuki Sakashita	0(0)	-	-	-	-	-	-	-	-	-	-	O	-	1(0)	1(0)

== Births ==
- 13 January: Akira Kaji
