= Yoshio Kato =

Japanese footballer (born 1957)

Yoshio Kato 加藤 好男
Personal information
- Full name: Yoshio Kato
- Date of birth: August 1, 1957 (age 69)
- Place of birth: Saitama, Saitama, Japan
- Height: 1.80 m (5 ft 11 in)
- Position: Goalkeeper

Youth career
- 1973–1975: Hongo High School
- 1976–1979: Osaka University of Commerce

Senior career*
| Years | Team | Apps | (Gls) |
| 1980–1993 | JEF United Ichihara | 87 | (0) |
| Total | | 87 | (0) |

International career
| 1980–1981 | Japan | 8 | (0) |
Medal record
JEF United Ichihara
| Winner | Japan Soccer League | 1985/86 |
| Winner | JSL Cup | 1982 |
| Winner | JSL Cup | 1986 |
| Runner-up | JSL Cup | 1990 |
| Runner-up | Emperor's Cup | 1984 |
- * Club domestic league appearances and goals

Yoshio Kato (加藤 好男, Katō Yoshio; born August 1, 1957) is a former Japanese football player. He played for Japan national team.

== Club career ==
Kato was born in Saitama on August 1, 1957. After graduating from Osaka University of Commerce, he joined Furukawa Electric (later JEF United Ichihara) in 1980. The club won the league champions in 1985–86. The club also won 1982 and 1986 JSL Cup. However, he could not play in the game much, as he was the team's reserve goalkeeper behind Choei Sato. Kato became a regular goalkeeper in later 1980s. He retired in 1993. He played 87 games in the league.

== National team career ==
On June 9, 1980, Kato debuted for Japan national team against Hong Kong. He played 8 games for Japan until 1981.

== Coaching career ==
After retirement, Kato started a coaching career at JEF United Ichihara in 1994. During the 2000s, he became a goalkeeper coach for the youth team of the Japan national team. In 2006, he became a goalkeeper coach for the Japan national team. He coached Japan until the 2010 World Cup under managers Ivica Osim and Takeshi Okada. In 2011, Kato moved to Thailand and became a goalkeeper coach for Chonburi. In 2013, he also became a goalkeeper coach for the Thailand football team. He returned to Japan in 2015 and coached at the JFA Academy.

== Club statistics ==
| Club performance | | | League | | Cup | | League Cup | | Total | |
| Season | Club | League | Apps | Goals | Apps | Goals | Apps | Goals | Apps | Goals |
| Japan | | | League | | Emperor's Cup | | J.League Cup | | Total | |
|---|---|---|---|---|---|---|---|---|---|---|
| 1980 | Furukawa Electric | JSL Division 1 | 1 | 0 | | | | | 1 | 0 |
| 1981 | Furukawa Electric | JSL Division 1 | 1 | 0 | | | | | 1 | 0 |
| 1982 | Furukawa Electric | JSL Division 1 | 0 | 0 | | | | | 0 | 0 |
| 1983 | Furukawa Electric | JSL Division 1 | 0 | 0 | | | | | 0 | 0 |
| 1984 | Furukawa Electric | JSL Division 1 | 3 | 0 | | | | | 3 | 0 |
| 1985/86 | Furukawa Electric | JSL Division 1 | 0 | 0 | | | | | 0 | 0 |
| 1986/87 | Furukawa Electric | JSL Division 1 | 17 | 0 | | | | | 17 | 0 |
| 1987/88 | Furukawa Electric | JSL Division 1 | 19 | 0 | | | | | 19 | 0 |
| 1988/89 | Furukawa Electric | JSL Division 1 | 19 | 0 | | | | | 19 | 0 |
| 1989/90 | Furukawa Electric | JSL Division 1 | 2 | 0 | | | 2 | 0 | 4 | 0 |
| 1990/91 | Furukawa Electric | JSL Division 1 | 1 | 0 | | | 5 | 0 | 6 | 0 |
| 1991/92 | Furukawa Electric | JSL Division 1 | 6 | 0 | | | 1 | 0 | 7 | 0 |
| 1992 | JEF United Ichihara | J1 League | - | | | | 4 | 0 | 4 | 0 |
| 1993 | JEF United Ichihara | J1 League | 18 | 0 | 0 | 0 | 3 | 0 | 21 | 0 |
| Total | | | 87 | 0 | 0 | 0 | 15 | 0 | 102 | 0 |

== National team statistics ==
Japan national team
| Year | Apps | Goals |
|---|---|---|
| 1980 | 3 | 0 |
| 1981 | 5 | 0 |
| Total | 8 | 0 |
