= Choei Sato =

Japanese footballer and manager

Choei Sato 佐藤 長栄
Personal information
- Full name: Choei Sato
- Date of birth: April 15, 1951 (age 75)
- Place of birth: Yamagata, Japan
- Height: 1.78 m (5 ft 10 in)
- Position: Goalkeeper

Youth career
- 1967–1969: Yonezawa Chuo High School
- 1970–1973: Chuo University

Senior career*
Years	Team	Apps	(Gls)
1974–1988	Furukawa Electric	142	(0)
Total		142	(0)

International career
1978	Japan	1	(0)

Managerial career
- 1996: Brummell Sendai
Medal record
Furukawa Electric
Winner	Japan Soccer League	1976
Winner	Japan Soccer League	1985/86
Winner	JSL Cup	1977
Winner	JSL Cup	1982
Winner	JSL Cup	1986
Runner-up	JSL Cup	1979
Winner	Emperor's Cup	1976
Runner-up	Emperor's Cup	1984
- * Club domestic league appearances and goals

Choei Sato (佐藤 長栄, Satō Chōei; born April 15, 1951) is a former Japanese football player and manager. He played for Japan national team.

== Club career ==
Sato was born in Yamagata Prefecture on April 15, 1951. After graduating from Chuo University, he joined Furukawa Electric in 1974. He debuted in 1976 and the club won Japan Soccer League and Emperor's Cup. The club also won 1985–86 Japan Soccer League, 1986 JSL Cup. He retired in 1988. He played 142 games in the league.

== National team career ==
On July 21, 1978, Sato debuted for Japan national team against Malaysia.

== Coaching career ==
After retirement, Sato started coaching career at Furukawa Electric (later JEF United Ichihara) in 1991 and he coached until 1994. In 1995, he moved to Shimizu S-Pulse. In 1996, he moved to Brummell Sendai and became a manager. In 1998, he signed with Urawa Reds and coached until 1999.

== Club statistics ==
Club performance			League	
Season	Club	League	Apps	Goals
Japan			League	
1974	Furukawa Electric	JSL Division 1	0	0
1975	Furukawa Electric	JSL Division 1	0	0
1976	Furukawa Electric	JSL Division 1	16	0
1977	Furukawa Electric	JSL Division 1	12	0
1978	Furukawa Electric	JSL Division 1	12	0
1979	Furukawa Electric	JSL Division 1	9	0
1980	Furukawa Electric	JSL Division 1	1	0
1981	Furukawa Electric	JSL Division 1	10	0
1982	Furukawa Electric	JSL Division 1	18	0
1983	Furukawa Electric	JSL Division 1	18	0
1984	Furukawa Electric	JSL Division 1	15	0
1985/86	Furukawa Electric	JSL Division 1	22	0
1986/87	Furukawa Electric	JSL Division 1	5	0
1987/88	Furukawa Electric	JSL Division 1	3	0
Total			142	0

== National team statistics ==
Japan national team
Year	Apps	Goals
1978	1	0
Total	1	0
