= Takashi Kuwahara =

Japanese footballer and manager (born 1948)

Takashi Kuwahara 桑原 隆
Personal information
- Full name: Takashi Kuwahara
- Date of birth: May 5, 1948 (age 78)
- Place of birth: Fujieda, Shizuoka, Japan
- Height: 1.69 m (5 ft 6 1/2 in)
- Position: Midfielder

Youth career
- 1964–1966: Fujieda Higashi High School

Senior career*
Years	Team	Apps	(Gls)
1967–1982	Furukawa Electric	215	(30)
Total		215	(30)

Managerial career
- 1993–1994: PJM Futures
- 1997: Júbilo Iwata (caretaker)
- 1999: Júbilo Iwata
- 2004: Júbilo Iwata
- 2008: Yokohama F. Marinos
Medal record
Furukawa Electric
Winner	Japan Soccer League	1976
Runner-up	Japan Soccer League	1967
Winner	JSL Cup	1977
Winner	JSL Cup	1982
Runner-up	JSL Cup	1979
Winner	Emperor's Cup	1976
- * Club domestic league appearances and goals

Takashi Kuwahara (桑原 隆, Kuwahara Takashi; born May 5, 1948) is a Japanese former football player and manager. His brother Katsuyoshi Kuwahara is also former footballer.

== Playing career ==
Kuwahara was born in Fujieda on May 5, 1948. After graduating from high school, he played for Furukawa Electric from 1967 to 1982.

== Coaching career ==
In 1979, player Kuwahara also became an assistant coach at Furukawa Electric and he left the club in 1983. He managed Japan Football League club PJM Futures from 1993 to 1994. He moved to J1 League club Júbilo Iwata in 1996 and he became assistant coach under manager Luiz Felipe Scolari in 1997. In July 1997, Scolari resigned. However, the club could not find a successor. So, Kuwahara managed the club as assistant coach (He could not become a manager because he didn't have a coaching license for J1 League manager). He led the club to won the champion. In 1998, he got a license for J1 League manager and he became manager in 1999. In 1999, he led the club to won the champion again. In 2004, he came back as manager, but in September he resigned and he left the club. In 2008, he signed with Yokohama F. Marinos, but in June he resigned. He was elected AFC Coach of the Year in 1998.

== Managerial statistics ==
Team	From	To	Record				
Team	From	To	G	W	D	L	Win %
Júbilo Iwata	1997	1997	21	17	0	4	80.95
Júbilo Iwata	1999	1999	30	17	1	12	56.67
Júbilo Iwata	2004	2004	19	11	2	6	57.89
Yokohama F. Marinos	2008	2008	16	5	3	8	31.25
Total			86	50	6	30	58.14

== Honours as manager ==
- J1 League - 1997, 1999
- Japanese Super Cup - 2004
- Asian Club Championship - 1999
- Asian Super Cup - 1999
