= Eijun Kiyokumo =

Japanese footballer and manager

Eijun Kiyokumo 清雲 栄純
Personal information
- Full name: Eijun Kiyokumo
- Date of birth: September 11, 1950 (age 76)
- Place of birth: Koshu, Yamanashi, Japan
- Height: 1.80 m (5 ft 11 in)
- Position: Defender

Youth career
- 1966–1968: Hikawa High School

College career
Years	Team	Apps	(Gls)
1969–1972	Hosei University		

Senior career*
Years	Team	Apps	(Gls)
1973–1982	Furukawa Electric	149	(6)
Total		149	(6)

International career
1974–1980	Japan	42	(0)

Managerial career
- 1984–1990: Furukawa Electric
- 1994–1995: JEF United Ichihara
- 1998: Japan U-20
- 2003: Omiya Ardija
Medal record
Furukawa Electric
Winner	Japan Soccer League	1976
Winner	JSL Cup	1977
Winner	JSL Cup	1982
Runner-up	JSL Cup	1979
Winner	Emperor's Cup	1976
- * Club domestic league appearances and goals

Eijun Kiyokumo (清雲 栄純, Kiyokumo Eijun; born September 11, 1950) is a former Japanese football player and manager. He played for Japan national team.

== Club career ==
Kiyokumo was born in Koshu on September 11, 1950. After graduating from Hosei University, he joined Furukawa Electric in 1973. In 1976, the club won the championship in the Japan Soccer League and the Emperor's Cup. The club also won the 1977 and 1982 JSL Cups. He retired in 1982. He played 149 games and scored 6 goals in the league. He was selected as one of the Best Eleven in 1974, 1975, and 1976.

== National team career ==
On September 28, 1974, Kiyokumo debuted for Japan national team against South Korea. He played at 1976 Summer Olympics qualification, 1978 World Cup qualification and 1980 Summer Olympics qualification. He played 42 games for Japan until 1980.

== Coaching career ==
After retirement, Kiyokumo became a manager for Furukawa Electric as Masao Uchino successor in 1984. He led the club to won 1985–86 Japan Soccer League, 1986 JSL Cup. In Asia, the club won 1986 Asian Club Championship. This is first Asian champion as a Japanese club. He resigned in 1990. In 1992, he served a coach for Japan national team under manager Hans Ooft. In 1994, he returned to JEF United Ichihara (former Furukawa Electric) and managed the club until 1995. In 1998, became a manager for Japan U-20 national team. In 1999, he signed with Omiya Ardija and became a general manager. In October 2003, he became a manager as Masaaki Kanno's successor.

== Club statistics ==
Club performance			League	
Season	Club	League	Apps	Goals
Japan			League	
1973	Furukawa Electric	JSL Division 1	17	0
1974	Furukawa Electric	JSL Division 1	17	0
1975	Furukawa Electric	JSL Division 1	18	0
1976	Furukawa Electric	JSL Division 1	18	2
1977	Furukawa Electric	JSL Division 1	16	2
1978	Furukawa Electric	JSL Division 1	10	0
1979	Furukawa Electric	JSL Division 1	18	1
1980	Furukawa Electric	JSL Division 1	12	1
1981	Furukawa Electric	JSL Division 1	18	0
1982	Furukawa Electric	JSL Division 1	5	0
Total			149	6

== National team statistics ==
Japan national team
Year	Apps	Goals
1974	1	0
1975	13	0
1976	9	0
1977	5	0
1978	0	0
1979	9	0
1980	5	0
Total	42	0

== Managerial statistics ==
Team	From	To	Record				
Team	From	To	G	W	D	L	Win %
JEF United Ichihara	1994	1995	96	47	0	49	48.96
Omiya Ardija	2003	2003	6	4	0	2	66.67
Total			102	51	0	51	50.00
