= Shigemi Ishii =

Japanese footballer (born 1951)

Shigemi Ishii 石井 茂巳
Personal information
- Full name: Shigemi Ishii
- Date of birth: July 7, 1951 (age 75)
- Place of birth: Japan
- Height: 1.78 m (5 ft 10 in)
- Position: Defender

Youth career
- Sendai High School
- Chuo University

Senior career*
| Years | Team | Apps | (Gls) |
| 1976–1986 | Furukawa Electric | 149 | (5) |
| Total | | 149 | (5) |

International career
| 1974–1979 | Japan | 15 | (0) |
Medal record
Furukawa Electric
| Winner | Japan Soccer League | 1976 |
| Winner | Japan Soccer League | 1985/86 |
| Winner | JSL Cup | 1977 |
| Winner | JSL Cup | 1982 |
| Winner | JSL Cup | 1986 |
| Runner-up | JSL Cup | 1979 |
| Winner | Emperor's Cup | 1976 |
| Runner-up | Emperor's Cup | 1984 |
Representing Japan
AFC U-19 Championship
| Silver medal – second place | 1973 Iran |
- * Club domestic league appearances and goals

Shigemi Ishii (石井 茂巳, Ishii Shigemi; born July 7, 1951) is a former Japanese football player. He played for Japan national team.

== Club career ==
Ishii was born on July 7, 1951. After graduating from Chuo University, he joined Furukawa Electric in 1976. The club won the league champions in 1976 and 1985–86. The club also won 1976 Emperor's Cup, 1977, 1982 and 1986 JSL Cup. He retired in 1986. He played 149 games and scored 5 goals in the league. He was selected Best Eleven in 1976.

== National team career ==
On February 12, 1974, when Ishii was a Chuo University student, he debuted for the Japan national team against Singapore. In September, he was selected by Japan for the 1974 Asian Games. He also played in the 1978 World Cup qualification. He played 15 games for Japan until 1979.

== Club statistics ==
| Club performance | | | League | |
| Season | Club | League | Apps | Goals |
| Japan | | | League | |
|---|---|---|---|---|
| 1976 | Furukawa Electric | JSL Division 1 | 18 | 0 |
| 1977 | Furukawa Electric | JSL Division 1 | 18 | 2 |
| 1978 | Furukawa Electric | JSL Division 1 | 18 | 0 |
| 1979 | Furukawa Electric | JSL Division 1 | 18 | 1 |
| 1980 | Furukawa Electric | JSL Division 1 | 18 | 1 |
| 1981 | Furukawa Electric | JSL Division 1 | 16 | 0 |
| 1982 | Furukawa Electric | JSL Division 1 | 17 | 0 |
| 1983 | Furukawa Electric | JSL Division 1 | 13 | 0 |
| 1984 | Furukawa Electric | JSL Division 1 | 12 | 1 |
| 1985/86 | Furukawa Electric | JSL Division 1 | 1 | 0 |
| Total | | | 149 | 5 |

== National team statistics ==
Japan national team
| Year | Apps | Goals |
|---|---|---|
| 1974 | 4 | 0 |
| 1975 | 1 | 0 |
| 1976 | 0 | 0 |
| 1977 | 4 | 0 |
| 1978 | 0 | 0 |
| 1979 | 6 | 0 |
| Total | 15 | 0 |
