= Masaaki Kanno =

Japanese footballer and manager

Masaaki Kanno 菅野 将晃
Personal information
- Full name: Masaaki Kanno
- Date of birth: August 15, 1960 (age 66)
- Place of birth: Kanagawa, Japan
- Height: 1.75 m (5 ft 9 in)
- Position: Midfielder

Youth career
- 1976–1978: Asahi High School

Senior career*
Years	Team	Apps	(Gls)
1979–1993	JEF United Ichihara	212	(35)
1994	Kyoto Purple Sanga	8	(1)
Total		220	(36)

Managerial career
- 2001–2002: Mito HollyHock
- 2003: Omiya Ardija
- 2006–2008: Shonan Bellmare
- 2009–2011: TEPCO Mareeze
- 2012–2018: Nojima Stella Kanagawa Sagamihara
Medal record
JEF United Ichihara
Winner	Japan Soccer League	1985/86
Winner	JSL Cup	1982
Winner	JSL Cup	1986
Runner-up	JSL Cup	1979
Runner-up	JSL Cup	1990
Runner-up	Emperor's Cup	1984
- * Club domestic league appearances and goals

Masaaki Kanno (菅野 将晃, Kanno Masaaki; born August 15, 1960) is a former Japanese football player and manager. His son Shota Kanno in also former footballer and who is the current head coach WE League club of Nojima Stella Kanagawa.

== Playing career ==
Kanno was born in Kanagawa Prefecture on August 15, 1960. After graduating from high school, he joined Japan Soccer League club Furukawa Electric (later JEF United Ichihara) in 1979. He played many matches from first season. The club won the champions 1985–86 Japan Soccer League, 1982 and 1986 JSL Cup. In 1992, Japan Soccer League was folded and founded new league J1 League. However his opportunity to play decreased and he left the club. He played 210 matches in the league in 15 seasons. In 1994, he joined Japan Football League club Kyoto Purple Sanga. He played in 1 season and retired end of 1994 season.

== Coaching career ==
After retirement, Kanno started coaching career at Kyoto Purple Sanga in 1995. He mainly served as manager for youth team. He moved to Mito HollyHock and served as assistant coach. In July, he became a manager as Hiroshi Kobayashi successor and managed until 2002. He moved to Omiya Ardija in 2003 and served as manager. However the club performance was bad and he was sacked in October. In 2004, he signed with Urawa Reds and became a manager for youth team until August. In 2005, he signed with Shonan Bellmare and became a coach. In June 2006, he became a manager as Eiji Ueda successor and managed until 2008. In 2009, he moved to L.League club TEPCO Mareeze. The club won the 3rd place in 2009 and 2010 season. However the club was disbanded for Fukushima Daiichi nuclear disaster in 2011, he was the last manager for the club. In 2012, he signed with new club Nojima Stella Kanagawa (later Nojima Stella Kanagawa Sagamihara). The club was promoted to Division 2 in 2013 and Division 1 in 2017. The club also won the 2nd place 2017 Empress's Cup. He resigned end of 2018 season.

== Club statistics ==
Club performance			League		Cup		League Cup		Total	
Season	Club	League	Apps	Goals	Apps	Goals	Apps	Goals	Apps	Goals
Japan			League		Emperor's Cup		J.League Cup		Total	
1979	Furukawa Electric	JSL Division 1	11	1	3	1	0	0	14	2
1980	Furukawa Electric	JSL Division 1	8	0			2	0	10	0
1981	Furukawa Electric	JSL Division 1	15	1	2	1	3	1	20	3
1982	Furukawa Electric	JSL Division 1	10	1	3	2	3	1	16	4
1983	Furukawa Electric	JSL Division 1	16	2	1	1	1	0	18	3
1984	Furukawa Electric	JSL Division 1	15	5	2	1	0	0	17	6
1985/86	Furukawa Electric	JSL Division 1	16	4	2	3	2	2	20	9
1986/87	Furukawa Electric	JSL Division 1	16	1	-		5	1	21	2
1987/88	Furukawa Electric	JSL Division 1	20	5	4	4	2	1	26	10
1988/89	Furukawa Electric	JSL Division 1	19	6	2	0	1	0	22	6
1989/90	Furukawa Electric	JSL Division 1	21	3	0	0	2	0	23	3
1990/91	Furukawa Electric	JSL Division 1	22	4			5	1	27	5
1991/92	Furukawa Electric	JSL Division 1	21	2			1	0	22	2
1992	JEF United Ichihara	J1 League	-				7	0	7	0
1993	JEF United Ichihara	J1 League	2	0	0	0	1	0	3	0
1994	Kyoto Purple Sanga	Football League	8	1	0	0	0	0	8	1
Total			220	36	20	13	35	7	275	56

== Managerial statistics ==
Team	From	To	Record				
Team	From	To	G	W	D	L	Win %
Mito HollyHock	2001	2002	68	18	8	42	26.47
Omiya Ardija	2003	2003	38	14	7	17	36.84
Shonan Bellmare	2006	2008	119	49	22	48	41.18
Total			225	81	37	107	36.00
