= Shigemi =

- Gender: unisex

Origin
- Origin: Japanese
- Meaning: Different meanings depending on the kanji used

Shigemi (written: 茂巳,繁美 etc.) is a unisex Japanese given name. Notable people with the name include:

- Shigemi Inaga (稲賀 繁美; born 1957), Japanese scholar
- Shigemi Ishii (石井 茂巳; born 1951), Japanese footballer
- Shigemi Saito (斎藤 繁美; born 1937), Japanese sport shooter
- Shigemi Tamura (田村 滋美; born 1938), Japanese rower

== See also ==
- 7597 Shigemi, a main-belt asteroid
