= 1986 JSL Cup final =

Furukawa Electric	Nissan Motors
4	0
- Date: July 13, 1986
- Venue: Nagoya Mizuho Athletics Stadium, Aichi

1986 JSL Cup final was the 11th final of the JSL Cup competition. The final was played at Nagoya Mizuho Athletics Stadium in Aichi on July 13, 1986. Furukawa Electric won the championship.

== Overview ==
Furukawa Electric won their 3rd title, by defeating Nissan Motors 4–0.

== Match details ==
July 13, 1986

Furukawa Electric	4-0	Nissan Motors
? ?' ? ?' ? ?' ? ?'

Nagoya Mizuho Athletics Stadium

== See also ==
- 1986 JSL Cup
