= Hiroshi Kobayashi (footballer) =

Japanese footballer and manager

Hiroshi Kobayashi 小林 寛
Personal information
- Date of birth: March 17, 1959 (age 67)
- Place of birth: Ibaraki, Japan
- Height: 1.70 m (5 ft 7 in)
- Position: Defender

Youth career
- 1974–1976: Hitachi Daiichi High School
- 1977–1980: Chuo University

Senior career*
Years	Team	Apps	(Gls)
1981–1989	Furukawa Electric	111	(2)
Total		111	(2)

Managerial career
- 1990–1998: ALO's Hokuriku
- 2000: Kawasaki Frontale
- 2001: Mito HollyHock
Medal record
Furukawa Electric
Winner	Japan Soccer League	1985/86
Winner	JSL Cup	1982
Winner	JSL Cup	1986
Runner-up	Emperor's Cup	1984
- * Club domestic league appearances and goals

Hiroshi Kobayashi (小林 寛, Kobayashi Hiroshi; born March 17, 1959) is a Japanese former football player and manager.

== Playing career ==
Kobayashi was born in Ibaraki Prefecture on March 17, 1959. After graduating from Chuo University, he played in the Japan Soccer League for Furukawa Electric from 1981 to 1989.

== Coaching career ==
Kobayashi began his soccer coaching career in 1990 as manager of new club ALO's Hokuriku, which he coached through 1998 leading the team to promotion in the league. He then coached for the second half of 2001 for J2 League club Kawasaki Frontale and the first 20 games of the 2002 season for Mito HollyHock before becoming Mito's general manager. He was the president of Mito HollyHock from 2002 to 2007.

== Managerial statistics ==
Team	From	To	Record				
Team	From	To	G	W	D	L	Win %
Kawasaki Frontale	2000	2000	5	2	0	3	40.00
Mito HollyHock	2001	2001	20	1	3	16	5.00
Total			25	3	3	19	12.00
