= 1977 JSL Cup final =

Furukawa Electric	Yanmar Diesel
4	0
- Date: May 25, 1977
- Venue: National Stadium, Tokyo

1977 JSL Cup final was the second final of the JSL Cup competition. The final was played at National Stadium in Tokyo on May 25, 1977. Furukawa Electric won the championship.

== Overview ==
Furukawa Electric won their 1st title, by defeating Yanmar Diesel 4–0.

== Match details ==
May 25, 1977

Furukawa Electric	4-0	Yanmar Diesel
? (?) ? (?) ? (?) ? (?)

National Stadium

== See also ==
- 1977 JSL Cup
