= Hideki Maeda =

Japanese footballer and manager

Hideki Maeda 前田 秀樹
Personal information
- Full name: Hideki Maeda
- Date of birth: May 13, 1954 (age 72)
- Place of birth: Kyoto, Kyoto, Japan
- Height: 1.69 m (5 ft 6 1/2 in)
- Position: Midfielder

Youth career
- 1970–1972: Kyoto Shogyo High School

College career
Years	Team	Apps	(Gls)
1973–1976	Hosei University		

Senior career*
Years	Team	Apps	(Gls)
1977–1989	Furukawa Electric	209	(35)
Total		209	(35)

International career
1975–1984	Japan	65	(11)

Managerial career
- 1998–1999: Yokogawa Electric
- 2003–2007: Mito HollyHock
Medal record
Furukawa Electric
Winner	Japan Soccer League	1985/86
Winner	JSL Cup	1977
Winner	JSL Cup	1982
Winner	JSL Cup	1986
Runner-up	JSL Cup	1979
Runner-up	Emperor's Cup	1984
- * Club domestic league appearances and goals

Hideki Maeda (前田 秀樹, Maeda Hideki; born May 13, 1954) is a former Japanese football player and manager. He played for Japan national team.

== Club career ==
Maeda was born in Kyoto on May 13, 1954. After graduating from Hosei University, he joined Furukawa Electric in 1977. The club won the champions in 1985–86 Japan Soccer League and 1986 JSL Cup and 1986 Asian Club Championship. He retired in 1989. He played 209 games and scored 35 goals in the league. He was selected Best Eleven in 1980 and 1982.

== National team career ==
On August 4, 1975, when Maeda was a Hosei University student, he debuted for Japan national team against Bangladesh. In 1978, he was selected Japan for 1978 Asian Games. In early 1980s, he served as captain. He played 65 games and scored 11 goals for Japan until 1984.

== Coaching career ==
After retirement, Maeda started coaching career at JEF United Ichihara (former Furukawa Electric) in 1994. He managed youth team at the club in 1997. In 1998, he moved to Yokogawa Electric and managed the club until 1999. In 2003, he signed with Mito HollyHock and managed the club until 2007.

== Club statistics ==
Club performance			League	
Season	Club	League	Apps	Goals
Japan			League	
1977	Furukawa Electric	JSL Division 1	16	0
1978	Furukawa Electric	JSL Division 1	18	0
1979	Furukawa Electric	JSL Division 1	18	7
1980	Furukawa Electric	JSL Division 1	16	8
1981	Furukawa Electric	JSL Division 1	15	1
1982	Furukawa Electric	JSL Division 1	13	7
1983	Furukawa Electric	JSL Division 1	13	1
1984	Furukawa Electric	JSL Division 1	18	5
1985/86	Furukawa Electric	JSL Division 1	20	4
1986/87	Furukawa Electric	JSL Division 1	16	1
1987/88	Furukawa Electric	JSL Division 1	15	0
1988/89	Furukawa Electric	JSL Division 1	22	1
1989/90	Furukawa Electric	JSL Division 1	9	0
Total			209	35

== National team statistics ==
Japan national team
Year	Apps	Goals
1975	5	1
1976	6	1
1977	3	0
1978	7	1
1979	9	3
1980	11	3
1981	11	0
1982	3	0
1983	7	2
1984	3	0
Total	65	11

== Managerial statistics ==
Team	From	To	Record				
Team	From	To	G	W	D	L	Win %
Mito HollyHock	2003	2007	228	56	62	110	24.56
Total			228	56	62	110	24.56
