= 1977 Japanese Super Cup =

Furukawa Electric	Yanmar Diesel
3	2
- Date: April 10, 1977
- Venue: National Stadium, Tokyo

1977 Japanese Super Cup was the inaugural Japanese Super Cup competition. The match was played at National Stadium in Tokyo on April 10, 1977. Furukawa Electric, who qualified as the 1976 Japan Soccer League champions, won the title against Yanmar Diesel. Yanmar qualified as 1976 Emperor's Cup runners-up, lost to Furukawa in the final.

== Match details ==
April 10, 1977

Furukawa Electric	3–2	Yanmar Diesel

National Stadium
