= Takeshi Okada =

Japanese footballer and manager

Takeshi Okada 岡田 武史
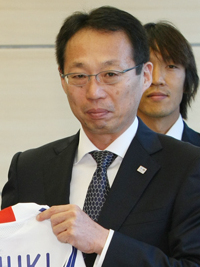
- 25 May 2010

Personal information
- Date of birth: 25 August 1956 (age 70)
- Place of birth: Osaka, Osaka, Japan
- Height: 1.75 m (5 ft 9 in)
- Position: Defender

Youth career
- 1972–1974: Tennoji High School

College career
Years	Team	Apps	(Gls)
1976–1979	Waseda University		

Senior career*
Years	Team	Apps	(Gls)
1980–1990	Furukawa Electric	189	(9)
Total		189	(9)

International career
1980–1985	Japan	24	(1)

Managerial career
- 1997–1998: Japan
- 1999–2001: Consadole Sapporo
- 2003–2006: Yokohama F. Marinos
- 2007–2010: Japan
- 2012–2013: Hangzhou Greentown
Medal record
Furukawa Electric
Winner	Japan Soccer League	1985/86
Winner	JSL Cup	1982
Winner	JSL Cup	1986
Runner-up	Emperor's Cup	1984
- * Club domestic league appearances and goals

Takeshi Okada (岡田 武史, Okada Takeshi; born August 25, 1956) is a Japanese football manager and former player who played as a defender. He is currently the owner of FC Imabari.

== Club career ==
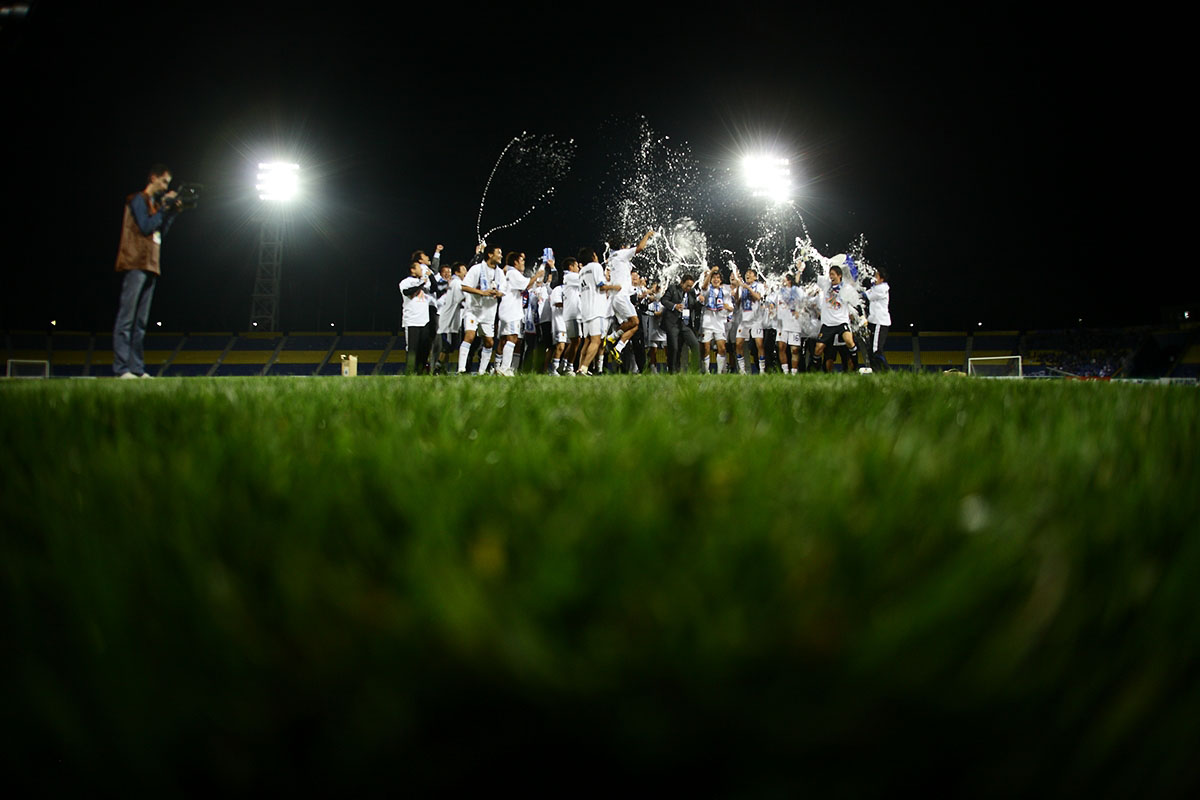
On 6 June 2009, Japan players celebrate qualifying for the 2010 FIFA World Cup in South Africa with head coach Takeshi Okada after winning the 2010 FIFA World Cup Asian Qualifiers Final round Group 1 match between Uzbekistan 0-1 Japan at Pakhtakor Stadium in Tashkent, Uzbekistan.

Okada was born in Osaka on August 25, 1956. After graduating from Waseda University, he joined Japan Soccer League (JSL) club Furukawa Electric in 1980. In 1982, the club won 1982 JSL Cup. In 1986, the club won JSL and JSL Cup and he was selected Best Eleven. The club also won 1986 Asian Club Championship. This is the first Asian champions as Japanese club. He retired in 1990. He played 189 games and scored 9 goals in the league.

== International career ==
On June 9, 1980, Okada debuted for Japan national team against Hong Kong. In 1982, he selected Japan for 1982 Asian Games. At the Asian Games, he played two games and scored a goal against South Korea. He also played in the 1980 Summer Olympics qualification and in the 1986 FIFA World Cup qualification. He played 24 games and scored 1 goal for Japan until 1985.

== Coaching career ==
After retirement, Okada started his coaching career at Furukawa Electric (later JEF United Ichihara) in 1990. In 1995, he became a coach for the Japan national team. During the 1998 World Cup qualification Final round in October 1997, Japan's manager Shu Kamo was sacked and Okada was named his successor. In November, Okada led Japan to qualify for the 1998 World Cup for the first time in Japan's history. At the 1998 World Cup, Japan lost all 3 matches and he resigned after the World Cup.

In 1999, Okada signed with J2 League club Consadole Sapporo. In 2000, he led the club to win the J2 League and promoted the club to the J1 League. He resigned at the end of the 2001 season. In 2003, he signed with Yokohama F. Marinos. The club won the league title and he was also awarded Best Manager for 2 years in a row in 2003 and 2004. From 2005, the club performance was sluggish and he resigned in August 2006.

In November 2007, Japan national team manager Ivica Osim suffered a cerebral infarction. In December, Okada was named a new manager for Japan. In 2008, he selected numerous new young players, including Atsuto Uchida, Shinji Kagawa, Yuto Nagatomo, Keisuke Honda, Shinji Okazaki and many others. In 2009, Japan qualified for the 2010 World Cup. Okada gained worldwide attention for leading Japan to ninth-place finish in the 2010 World Cup. He was commended for turning his Japanese team of young, inexperienced players into a slick passing, talented squad of youngsters. He resigned after the 2010 World Cup. In November, he was awarded AFC Coach of the Year.

Okada signed a contract with Chinese Super League side Hangzhou Greentown on 14 December 2011. He extended his contract for two years in the end of 2012 season. However, he resigned from Hangzhou on 5 November 2013.

In November 2014, he bought a majority stake in FC Imabari and became a chairman of the club. In March 2016, he became a vice-president of Japan Football Association and served until March 2018.

== Career statistics ==
=== Club ===
Appearances and goals by club, season and competition
Club	Season	League			Emperor's Cup		JSL Cup		Total	
Club	Season	Division	Apps	Goals	Apps	Goals	Apps	Goals	Apps	Goals
Furukawa Electric	1980	JSL Division 1	14	0					14	0
Furukawa Electric	1981	JSL Division 1	17	0					17	0
Furukawa Electric	1982	JSL Division 1	18	0					18	0
Furukawa Electric	1983	JSL Division 1	15	1					15	1
Furukawa Electric	1984	JSL Division 1	17	0					17	0
Furukawa Electric	1985–86	JSL Division 1	22	4					22	4
Furukawa Electric	1986–87	JSL Division 1	21	1					21	1
Furukawa Electric	1987–88	JSL Division 1	22	1					22	1
Furukawa Electric	1988–89	JSL Division 1	21	1					21	1
Furukawa Electric	1989–90	JSL Division 1	22	1			2	0	24	1
Career total			189	9	0	0	2	0	191	10

=== International ===
Appearances and goals by national team and year
National team	Year	Apps	Goals
Japan	1980	3	0
Japan	1981	5	0
Japan	1982	2	1
Japan	1983	7	0
Japan	1984	4	0
Japan	1985	3	0
Total		24	1

== Managerial statistics ==
As of match played 3 November 2013

Managerial record by team and tenure
Team	Nat	From	To	Record				
Team	Nat	From	To	G	W	D	L	Win %
Japan	(Japan)	5 October 1997	31 July 1998	15	5	4	6	33.33
Consadole Sapporo	(Japan)	1 February 1999	31 January 2002	112	60	16	36	53.57
Yokohama F.Marinos	(Japan)	1 February 2003	24 August 2006	153	72	36	45	47.06
Japan	(Japan)	10 December 2007	30 June 2010	50	26	13	11	52.00
Hangzhou Greentown	(China)	15 December 2011	5 November 2013	66	21	19	26	31.82
Career Total				396	184	88	124	46.46

== Honours ==
=== As player ===
Furukawa Electric

- Japan Soccer League: 1985–86
- Asian Club Championship: 1986

Individual

- Japan Soccer League Best Eleven: 1985–86

=== As Manager ===
Yokohama F. Marinos

- J.League Division 1: 2003, 2004

Individual

- AFC Coach of the Month: November 1997
- J.League Manager of the Year: 2003, 2004
- AFC Coach of the Year: 2010
- Japan Football Hall of Fame: Inducted in 2019
