= Kozo Tashima =

Japanese footballer (born 1957)

Kozo Tashima 田嶋幸三
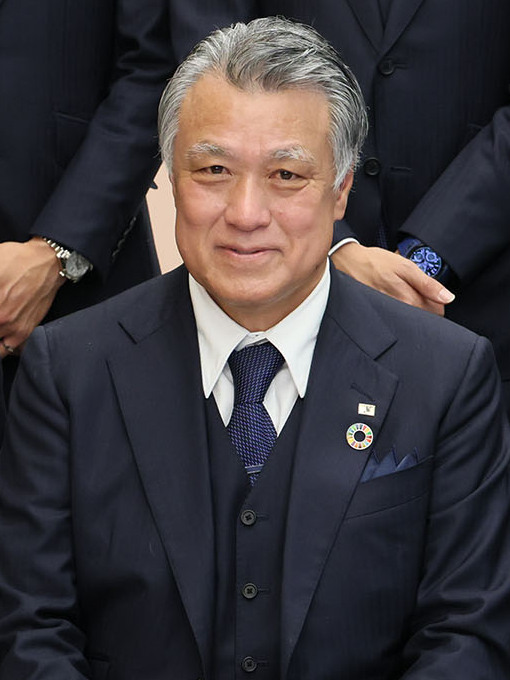
- Tashima in 2022

Personal information
- Date of birth: 21 November 1957 (age 68)
- Place of birth: Amakusa District, Kumamoto, Japan
- Positions: Midfielder; forward

Youth career
- 1973–1975: Saitama Urawa Minami High School
- 1976–1979: University of Tsukuba

Senior career*
Years	Team	Apps	(Gls)
1980–1982	Furukawa Electric	39	(6)
Total		39	(6)

International career
1979–1980	Japan	7	(1)

Managerial career
- 1999–2001: Japan U17
- 2002: Japan U19
Medal record
Furukawa Electric
Winner	JSL Cup	1982
- * Club domestic league appearances and goals

Kozo Tashima (Japanese: 田嶋 幸三, Hepburn: Tashima Kōzō; born 21 November 1957) is a Japanese football administrator and former player. He played for the Japan national team. He was the president of the Japan Football Association from 2016 to 2024 and East Asian Football Federation from 2016 to 2017.

== Early life and education ==
Tashima was born in Amakusa District, Kumamoto on 21 November 1957. In 1976, he won the Japanese high school championship with his team from Urawa-South high school. He studied sports science at the University of Tsukuba.

== Playing career ==
On 27 June 1979, when Tashima was a University of Tsukuba student, he debuted for the Japan national team against Malaysia. He played 7 games and scored 1 goal for Japan.

After graduating, he joined Furukawa Electric in 1980. The club won the 2nd place in 1982 JSL Cup. He retired in 1982. He played 39 games and scored 6 goals in the league.

== Management career ==
From 1983 to 1986, Tashima studied at the German Sport University Cologne and received a B coaching license. As he returned, he was a technical coach for the football club of his alma mater, and taught for several years at Rikkyo University. In 2001, he coached the Japan U-17 national team, to which he led for the first time since 1995 in the first round of the 2001 U-17 World Championship.

In July 2010, Tashima served as vice-president of Japan Football Association (JFA). Since January 2011, he has been a member of the Asian Football Confederation Executive Committee. He has been a FIFA Council member since April 2015. In March 2016, he became president of JFA. In April 2016, he also became president of East Asian Football Federation and served until March 2018.

In November 2026, Tashima announced his candidacy to be elected FIFA President in a vote that will be held on 18 March 2027, in Rabat, Morocco.

== Career statistics ==
=== Club ===
Club performance			League	
Season	Club	League	Apps	Goals
Japan			League	
1980	Furukawa Electric	JSL Division 1	14	4
1981	Furukawa Electric	JSL Division 1	14	1
1982	Furukawa Electric	JSL Division 1	11	1
Total			39	6

=== International ===
Japan national team
Year	Apps	Goals
1979	4	0
1980	3	1
Total	7	1

== Honours ==
- Medal with Blue Ribbon (2020)

== Personal life ==
Tashima is an uncle of Keita Hidaka, who currently plays as a midfielder for FC Osaka.
