= Haruhisa Hasegawa =

Japanese footballer

Haruhisa Hasegawa 長谷川 治久
Personal information
- Full name: Haruhisa Hasegawa
- Date of birth: April 14, 1957 (age 69)
- Place of birth: Hyogo, Japan
- Height: 1.78 m (5 ft 10 in)
- Position: Forward

Youth career
- 1973–1975: Hokuyo High School
- 1976–1979: Osaka University of Commerce

Senior career*
Years	Team	Apps	(Gls)
1980–1987	Yanmar Diesel	75	(24)
Total		75	(24)

International career
1978–1981	Japan	15	(4)
Medal record
Yanmar Diesel
Winner	Japan Soccer League	1980
Winner	JSL Cup	1983
Winner	JSL Cup	1984
Runner-up	JSL Cup	1982
Runner-up	Emperor's Cup	1983
- * Club domestic league appearances and goals

Haruhisa Hasegawa (長谷川 治久, Hasegawa Haruhisa; born April 14, 1957) is a former Japanese football player. He played for Japan national team.

== Club career ==
Hasegawa was born in Hyogo Prefecture on April 14, 1957. After graduating from Osaka University of Commerce, he joined Yanmar Diesel in 1980. The club won the league championship in 1980. Yanmar Diesel also won the 1983 and 1984 JSL Cup. He retired in 1987, having played 75 games and scored 24 goals in the league. He was named to the Best Eleven in 1982.

== National team career ==
On November 19, 1978, while still a student at Osaka University of Commerce student, Hasegawa made his debut for the Japan national team in a match against the Soviet Union. He was selected to represent Japan for the 1978 Asian Games. In 1980, he also played at 1980 Summer Olympics qualification rounds and 1982 World Cup qualification. He played 15 games and scored 4 goals for Japan until 1981.

== National team statistics ==
Japan national team
Year	Apps	Goals
1978	4	0
1979	1	0
1980	9	4
1981	1	0
Total	15	4
