= Kazuyoshi Nakamura =

Japanese footballer

Kazuyoshi Nakamura 中村 一義
Personal information
- Full name: Kazuyoshi Nakamura
- Date of birth: April 8, 1955 (age 71)
- Place of birth: Fujieda, Shizuoka, Japan
- Height: 1.70 m (5 ft 7 in)
- Position: Forward

Youth career
- 1971–1973: Fujieda Higashi High School
- 1974–1977: Hosei University

Senior career*
Years	Team	Apps	(Gls)
1978–1981	Fujitsu		

International career
1979	Japan	5	(1)
Medal record
Representing Japan
AFC U-19 Championship
Silver medal – second place	1973 Iran
- * Club domestic league appearances and goals

Kazuyoshi Nakamura (中村 一義, Nakamura Kazuyoshi; born April 8, 1955) is a former Japanese football player. He played for Japan national team.

== Club career ==
Nakamura was born in Fujieda on April 8, 1955. After graduating from Hosei University, he joined Fujitsu in 1978. In 1978 season, however he played 11 games and scored 3 goals, the club was relegated to Division 2. He retired in 1981.

== National team career ==
On March 4, 1979, Nakamura debuted for Japan national team against South Korea. In this match, he scored a goal and Japan won the match. He played 5 games and scored 1 goal for Japan in 1979.

== National team statistics ==
Japan national team
Year	Apps	Goals
1979	5	1
Total	5	1
