= Yoshiichi Watanabe =

Japanese footballer

Yoshiichi Watanabe 渡辺 由一
Personal information
- Full name: Yoshiichi Watanabe
- Date of birth: April 5, 1954 (age 72)
- Place of birth: Japan
- Height: 1.70 m (5 ft 7 in)
- Position: Midfielder

Youth career
- 1970–1972: Tohoku High School
- 1973–1976: Sendai University

Senior career*
Years	Team	Apps	(Gls)
1977–1982	Mazda	81	(3)
Total		81	(3)

International career
1979	Japan	6	(1)
Medal record
Mazda
Runner-up	Emperor's Cup	1978
- * Club domestic league appearances and goals

Yoshiichi Watanabe (渡辺 由一, Watanabe Yoshiichi; born April 5, 1954) is a former Japanese football player. He played for Japan national team.

== Club career ==
Watanabe was born on April 5, 1954. After graduating from Sendai University, he joined Toyo Industries (later Mazda) in 1977. The club won the 2nd place in 1978 Emperor's Cup. He retired in 1982. He played 81 games and scored three goals in the league.

== National team career ==
On June 16, 1979, Watanabe debuted for Japan national team against South Korea. He played six games and scored one goal for Japan in 1979.

== National team statistics ==
Japan national team
Year	Apps	Goals
1979	6	1
Total	6	1
