= Shigemi Inaga =

Japanese scholar

Shigemi Inaga (稲賀 繁美 1957 in Hiroshima) is a Japanese scholar in comparative literature, culture, and the history of cultural exchange.

== Education ==
Inaga studied for a Master of Arts degree in comparative literature and 19th-century French art history at the University of Tokyo before earning a Doctor of Philosophy degree (博士 hakushi) in 1988 at Paris Diderot University.

== Career ==
From 1988 to 1990, Inaga was employed as an assistant in the Department of Liberal Arts of Tokyo University. He then took a position as associate professor at Mie University, a position he held from 1990 to 1997. In 1997, Inaga was appointed to International Research Center for Japanese Studies and was promoted to full professor in 2004. From 2006 to 2007, he was a visiting scholar at the John W. Kluge Center in the Library of Congress, Washington, D.C. Between 2013 and 2015, Inaga was Dean of the School of Cultural and Social Studies at the Graduate University for Advanced Studies in Japan. Between 2016 and 2018, Inaga was the Deputy Director-General of the International Research Center for Japanese Studies. In September 2020, he was appointed dean of the newly installed Faculty of Global Culture at Kyoto Seika University, which was to open in April 2021.

== Bibliography ==
=== As author ===
- Modernity of Japanese Art History and its Exterior (Nihon Bijutsu no Kindai to sono Gaibu), Tokyo: NHK Publishing
- In Search of haptic Plasticity: Soul Touching each Other, Forms Interwoven (Sesshoku zoukeiron, Fureau Tamashii, Tsumugareru Katachi), Nagoya, The University of Nagoya Press
- Images on the Edge: A Historical Survey of East-Asian Trans-Cultural Modernities (kaiga no Rinkai : Kindai Higashi Azia Bijutushi no Shikkoku to Meiun), Nagoya, The University of Nagoya Press
- L’Orient de la peinture : de l’Orientalisme au Japonisme (Kaiga no Tôhô, Orientarizumu kara Jyaponisumu he) Nagoya, The University of Nagoya Press
- Le Crépuscule de la peinture; la lutte posthume d’Édouard Manet (Kaiga no Tasogare : Edowâdo Mane Botsugo no Tôsô), Nagoya, The University of Nagoya Press

=== As editor ===
- Pirate's View of the World History, A Reversed Perception of the Order of Things (Kaizoku-Shikan kara mita Sekaishi no Sai-Kôchiku), Kyoto: Shibunkaku Shuppan Ltd.
- Vocabulaire de la spatialité japonaise (Nihon no seikatsu kūkan), coédité avec Philippe Bonnin et Nishida Masatsugu (dir.), Paris, CNRS Éditions
- Oriental Consciousness between Reverie and Reality 1887-1953 (Tôyô-Ishiki, Musô to Genjitsu no Aida, 19887-1953), Kyoto, Minerva Publishing Co. Ltd.
- A Not-yet ending “Moderninty”: Yagi Kazuo and the Objet-Cuit (Owarikirenai “Kindai”-Yagi Kazuo to Obuje-yaki) Co-edited with Hida Toyorô, Tokyo, Bigaku Shuppan
- Books on Ukiyoe and Japanese Arts in English by Yone Noguchi, Tokyo, Edition Synapse (in 3 volumes)
- Traditional Japanese Arts & Crafts; A Reconsideration from Inside and Outside Kyoto (Dentô Kôgei Saikô, Kyô no Uchi-soto), Kyoto, Shibunkaku Shuppan Ltd.
- Toward an Ethics in Inter-Cultural Understanding (Ibunka Rikai no Rinri ni Mukete), Nagoya, The University of Nagoya Press

=== As proceedings editor ===
- A Pirate's View of World History--A Reversed Perception of the Order of Things From a Global Perspective. The 50th International Research Symposium：IRCJS
- Pour un Vocabulaire de la Spatialité Japonaise. The 43rd International Research Symposium (edited with Philippe Bonnin and Nishida Masatsugu), IRCJS
- Questioning Oriental Aesthetics and Thinking: Conflicting Visions of “Asia” under the Colonial Empires. The 38th International Research Symposium, IRCJS
- Artistic Vagabondage and New Utopian Projects: Transnational Poïetic Experience in East-Asian Modernity (1905-1960) :Selected Papers from the XIXth Congress of the International Comparative Literature Association, Seoul, 2010, Expanding the Frontiers of Comparative Literature, Kyoto, IRCJS, Uno Printing Ltd. .
- Traditional Japanese Arts and Crafts in the 21st Century -Reconsidering the Future from an International Perspective (edited with Patricia Fister), International Research Symposium Proceedings 27: IRCJS
- Crossing Cultural Borders: Toward an Ethics of Intercultural Communication -Beyond Reciprocal Anthropology (edited with Kenneth L. Richard), International Research Symposium Proceedings 14, IRCJS

=== As periodicals guest editor ===
- Depiction and Description: Morphology of Modern Visuality and Marketplace in Transition—Methodological Reflections, Art History Forum, special issue, Vol.20.
- The making of Art History, History of Architecture and Archaeology ib Modernizing East-Asia, Nihon-Kenkyû, Bulletin of the International Research Center for Japanese Studies, No.26.

=== As translator ===
- Pierre Bourdieu, Ce que parler veut dire, économie des échanges lingusitiques (en japonais), as Hanasu to iukoto, Gengoteki Kôkan no Ekonomi, Tokyo, Fujiwara Shoten Ltd.
- Rachel Burns, Edgar Degas (into Japanese), as Doga, Tokyo, Nikkei Pocket Gallery

== Awards ==
- Price for Publication、the Académie de l'Architecture 2014
- Watsuji Tetsuro Culture Award 2000
- Suntory Prize for Social Sciences and Humanities 1997
- Ringa Art Incentive Award 1997
- Special Award, Shibusawa-Claudel Prize 1997
- Japonaiserie Study Society Award 1980
- 4th Black Belt in Aikidô, Akikikai

== Academic society memberships ==
- Association for Asian Studies
- European Association for Japanese Studies
- International Comparative Literature Association
- Word and Image, Sociologie de l'art
- Japonisme Research Society
- Société franco-Japonaise d'art et d'archéologie
- Japan Comparative Literature Association
- Meiji Art Association
- Japan Art History Society
