= Yuji Kishioku =

Japanese footballer

Yuji Kishioku 岸奥 裕二
Personal information
- Full name: Yuji Kishioku
- Date of birth: April 2, 1954 (age 72)
- Place of birth: Muroran, Hokkaido, Japan
- Height: 1.71 m (5 ft 7 1/2 in)
- Position: Defender

Youth career
- 1970–1972: Muroran Otani High School

Senior career*
Years	Team	Apps	(Gls)
1973–????	Nippon Steel		

International career
1979–1980	Japan	10	(2)
- * Club domestic league appearances and goals

Yuji Kishioku (岸奥 裕二, Kishioku Yuji; born April 2, 1954) is a former Japanese football player. He played for Japan national team.

== Club career ==
Kishioku was born in Muroran on April 2, 1954. After graduating from high school, he joined Nippon Steel in 1973. He played 121 games and scored 1 goal in Japan Soccer League Division 1.

== National team career ==
On May 31, 1979, Kishioku debuted for Japan national team against Indonesia. He played at 1980 Summer Olympics qualification. He played 10 games and scored 2 goals for Japan until 1980.

== National team statistics ==
Japan national team
Year	Apps	Goals
1979	5	0
1980	5	2
Total	10	2
