= 1976 Emperor's Cup =

Japanese football tournament

Tournament details
- Country: Japan
- Teams: 26

Final positions
- Champions: Furukawa Electric
- Runners-up: Yanmar Diesel
- Semifinalists: Nippon Steel; Fujita Industries

Statistics of Emperor's Cup in the 1976 season.

== Overview ==
It was contested by 26 teams, and Furukawa Electric won the cup.

== Results ==
=== 1st round ===
- Fukuoka University 2–1 Tanabe Pharmaceuticals
- Nippon Kokan 1–3 Yomiuri
- Teijin Matsuyama 0–4 Toyo Industries
- Yamaguchi Teachers 0–2 Kyoto Shiko
- Nihon University 0–2 Yamaha Motors
- Chuo University 2–0 Gonohe Town Hall
- Yanmar Club 2–1 Honda
- Fujita Industries 5–0 Dainichi Cable Industries
- Niigata Eleven 1–4 Toyota Motors
- Sapporo University 0–6 Waseda University

=== 2nd round ===
- Yanmar Diesel 5–2 Fukuoka University
- Yomiuri 1–2 Toyo Industries
- Eidai 2–0 Kyoto Shiko
- Yamaha Motors 3–3 (PK 2–3) Nippon Steel
- Hitachi 2–0 Chuo University
- Yanmar Club 0–2 Furukawa Electric
- Fujita Industries 3–0 Toyota Motors
- Waseda University 0–1 Mitsubishi Motors

=== Quarterfinals ===
- Yanmar Diesel 2–1 Toyo Industries
- Eidai 0–1 Nippon Steel
- Hitachi 2–3 Furukawa Electric
- Fujita Industries 2–0 Mitsubishi Motors

=== Semifinals ===
- Yanmar Diesel 1–0 Nippon Steel
- Furukawa Electric 4–0 Fujita Industries

=== Final ===
- Yanmar Diesel 1–4 Furukawa Electric

Furukawa Electric won the cup.
