= 1977 JSL Cup =

Tournament details
- Country: Japan

Final positions
- Champions: Furukawa Electric
- Runners-up: Yanmar Diesel
- Semifinalists: Fujita Industries; Furukawa Electric

The 1977 JSL Cup was contested by 20 teams, and Furukawa Electric won the championship.

== Results ==
=== East-A ===
	Nippon Kokan	Furukawa Electric	Hitachi	Fujitsu	Sumitomo Metals
Nippon Kokan	-	1-0	1-0	3-0	1-0
Furukawa Electric	0-1	-	2-1	6-2	4-1
Hitachi	0-1	1-2	-	1-0	5-0
Fujitsu	0-3	2-6	0-1	-	1-0
Sumitomo Metals	0-1	1-4	0-5	0-1	-

=== East-B ===
	Fujita Industries	Mitsubishi Motors	Kofu	Nissan Motors	Yomiuri
Fujita Industries	-	3-0	1-0	1-0	5-0
Mitsubishi Motors	0-3	-	2-0	4-0	3-2
Kofu	0-1	0-2	-	1-0	1-1
Nissan Motors	0-1	1-4	0-1	-	5-1
Yomiuri	0-5	2-3	1-1	1-5	-

=== West-A ===
	Yanmar Diesel	Kyoto Shiko	Tanabe Pharmaceuticals	Toyota Motors
Yanmar Diesel	-	4-1	2-1	2-0
Kyoto Shiko	1-4	-	1-1	2-1
Tanabe Pharmaceuticals	1-2	1-1	-	1-1
Toyota Motors	0-2	1-2	1-1	-

=== West-B ===
	Nippon Steel	Honda	Yanmar Club	Toyo Industries	Teijin
Nippon Steel	-	1-1	2-0	1-1	3-1
Honda	1-1	-	2-4	2-0	2-1
Yanmar Club	0-2	4-2	-	2-1	1-2
Toyo Industries	1-1	0-2	1-2	-	2-1
Teijin	1-3	1-2	2-1	1-2	-

=== Quarterfinals ===
- Nippon Kokan 0-2 Honda
- Yanmar Diesel 1-0 Mitsubishi Motors
- Fujita Industries 4-0 Kyoto Shiko
- Nippon Steel 0-2 Furukawa Electric

=== Semifinal ===
- Honda 2-3 Yanmar Diesel
- Fujita Industries 1-2 Furukawa Electric

=== Final ===
- Yanmar Diesel 0-4 Furukawa Electric

Furukawa Electric won the championship
