= 1986 JSL Cup =

Tournament details
- Country: Japan

Final positions
- Champions: Furukawa Electric
- Runners-up: Nissan Motors FC
- Semifinalists: Honda; Yanmar Diesel

Statistics of JSL Cup in the 1986 season.

== Overview ==
It was contested by 27 teams, and Furukawa Electric won the championship.

== Results ==
=== 1st round ===
- Furukawa Electric 4-1 Tanabe Pharmaceuticals
- Fujita Industries 4-0 Osaka Gas
- Yamaha Motors 3-1 Seino Transportations
- Honda 9-0 Kyoto Police
- Mitsubishi Motors 3-2 Mazda
- Fujitsu 2-2 (PK 4–3) Toho Titanium
- Nippon Kokan 1-1 (PK 3–0) Matsushita Electric
- Kawasaki Steel 2-0 TDK
- Toshiba 2-1 Nippon Steel
- Sumitomo Metals 3-1 Toyota Motors
- Yomiuri 0-2 Nissan Motors

=== 2nd round ===
- NTT Kansai 0-10 Furukawa Electric
- Fujita Industries 3-0 Yamaha Motors
- Honda 1-0 Mitsubishi Motors
- Kofu 2-1 Cosmo Oil
- Yanmar Diesel 3-0 Fujitsu
- Nippon Kokan 2-0 Kawasaki Steel
- Toshiba 2-0 Sumitomo Metals
- Nissan Motors 1-0 Hitachi

=== Quarterfinals ===
- Furukawa Electric 1-0 Fujita Industries
- Honda 2-2 (PK 5–4) Kofu
- Yanmar Diesel 2-1 Nippon Kokan
- Toshiba 0-3 Nissan Motors

=== Semifinals ===
- Furukawa Electric 0-0 (PK 4–3) Honda
- Yanmar Diesel 1-1 Nissan Motors (PK 3–4)

=== Final ===
- Furukawa Electric 4-0 Nissan Motors

Furukawa Electric won the championship
