= 1982 JSL Cup =

Tournament details
- Country: Japan

Final positions
- Champions: Furukawa Electric
- Runners-up: Yanmar Diesel
- Semifinalists: Nippon Kokan; Yamaha Motors

Statistics of JSL Cup in the 1982 season.

== Overview ==
It was contested by 20 teams, and Furukawa Electric won the championship.

== Results ==
=== 1st round ===
- Furukawa Electric 3–1 Yomiuri
- Teijin 2–1 Saitama Teachers
- Hitachi 0–1 Nippon Steel
- Fujita Industries 10–0 Kofu

=== 2nd round ===
- Mitsubishi Motors 4–1 Toyota Motors
- Furukawa Electric 6–1 Nissan Motors
- Sumitomo Metals 1–1 (PK 4–1) Teijin
- Nippon Kokan 1–1 (PK 5–4) Fujitsu
- Yamaha Motors 1–0 Tanabe Pharmaceuticals
- Nippon Steel 1–1 (PK 3–4) Toshiba
- Yanmar Diesel 1–1 (PK 7–6) Fujita Industries
- Mazda 1–3 Honda

=== Quarterfinals ===
- Mitsubishi Motors 3–4 Furukawa Electric
- Sumitomo Metals 0–6 Nippon Kokan
- Yamaha Motors 1–0 Toshiba
- Yanmar Diesel 3–0 Honda

=== Semifinals ===
- Furukawa Electric 1–1 (PK 4–3) Nippon Kokan
- Yamaha Motors 0–0 (PK 2–4) Yanmar Diesel

=== Final ===
- Furukawa Electric 3–2 Yanmar Diesel

Furukawa Electric won the championship
