= JEF United Chiba =

Japanese football club

JEF United Chiba ジェフユナイテッド千葉
- Full name: JEF United Ichihara Chiba
- Nicknames: JEF, Inu (The Dogs)
- Founded: 1946; 80 years ago as Furukawa Electric SC
- Stadium: Fukuda Denshi Arena; Chiba
- Capacity: 19,781
- Owner(s): East Japan Railway Company (50%); Furukawa Electric (50%)
- Chairman: Akira Shimada
- Manager: Yoshiyuki Kobayashi
- League: J1 League
- 2026: J1 League, 20th of 20
- Website: jefunited.co.jp
| Home colours | Away colours |

JEF United Chiba (ジェフユナイテッド千葉, Jefu Yunaiteddo Chiba), full name JEF United Ichihara Chiba (ジェフユナイテッド市原・千葉, Jefu Yunaiteddo Ichihara Chiba), also known as JEF Chiba (ジェフ千葉, Jefu Chiba), is a Japanese professional football club based in Chiba, capital of Chiba Prefecture. They currently play in the J1 League, the top tier of the Japanese football league system, after promotion from the J2 League in 2025.

== History ==
=== Furukawa Electric SC (1946–1991) ===
The club began as the company team, Furukawa Electric Soccer Club (古河電気工業サッカー部) in 1946. As the company team, it won the Japan Soccer League twice, the Emperor's Cup four times and the JSL League Cup three times. Furukawa also won the 1986–87 Asian Club Championship, the top club honour in Asia; they were the first Japanese club to do so.

The club was a founding member ("Original Eight" (Note: The Original Eight of the Japan Soccer League (JSL) in 1965 were Mitsubishi, Furukawa, Hitachi, Yanmar, Toyo Industries, Yahata Steel, Toyota Industries and Nagoya Mutual Bank.)) of the Japan Soccer League (JSL) in 1965. Since the league's inception, the club had always played in the top flight in Japan and was the only Japanese club to never be relegated from the JSL Division 1, a record they kept into the J1 years. They did finish the 1978 season in a relegation position (last of 10) but stayed up after beating Honda FC 1–0 on aggregate in a two-legged playoff. The last place was not automatically relegated until the 1980 season.

=== JEF United Ichihara (1992–2004) ===
In 1991, it merged with the JR East's company team to become East Japan JR Furukawa Football Club (東日本ジェイアール古河サッカークラブ) and rebranded itself as JEF United Ichihara upon the J.League's founding in 1993. JEF United Ichihara was an original member ("Original Ten" (Note: The Original Ten of the J.League in 1992 were Kashima Antlers, Urawa Red Diamonds, JEF United Ichihara, Verdy Kawasaki, Yokohama Marinos, Yokohama Flügels, Shimizu S-Pulse, Nagoya Grampus Eight, Gamba Osaka and Sanfrecce Hiroshima.)) of the J.League in 1993. The club initially built itself around the former Germany national team player Pierre Littbarski.

From 1998 to 2000, the club struggled to stay in the J.League and it began a series of efforts to be a competitive team. Since the hiring of Ivica Osim in 2003, JEF United has contended for the league title each year despite limited resources and struggling attendance.

=== JEF United Chiba (2005–present) ===
On 1 February 2005, the club changed its name from JEF United Ichihara to the current name after Chiba city had joined Ichihara, Chiba as its hometown in 2003. Of its club name, JEF is taken from the JR East and Furukawa Electric companies and United is meant to represent the unity of the club and its home city. Also, JEF United is the only team in J.League whose corporate name survived the transition from the JSL in 1992, as J.League mandated that "corporate teams are not allowed in the J.League", and that any corporate teams need to adapt a hometown and name themselves after it, rather than their owner companies.

On 16 July 2006, Osim left the club to take over as coach of the Japan national team and was succeeded by Bosnian manager Amar Osim, his son and assistant coach. On December 5, 2007, it was announced that Amar Osim had been sacked after the club's lowly 13th-place finish in the 2007 season.

After 13 games in the 2008 season Josip Kuže was sacked as team manager. On 8 May 2008, the club then announced Scottish Alex Miller as the club new manager. The Furukawa Electric is no longer the main sponsor of the club, a job these days taken over by Fuji Electric.

==== Downfall of the club ====
On 8 November 2009, JEF United Chiba was relegated to J2 after 44 seasons in Japan's top division, and from 2010 to 2025, they competed in the J.League Division 2.

JEF United Chiba was close to being promoted to J.League Division 1 during the 2012 season. The club was considered one of the favourites to be automatically promoted to J1. However, after defeats to clubs considered lesser than them such as FC Gifu and Machida Zelvia, JEF played the playoffs, making their road to the final. They defeated Yokohama FC by 4–0, but lost the final match to Oita Trinita by 1–0, at Tokyo National Stadium.

==== Near miss promotion ====
In the 2013 season, JEF United Chiba played in the promotion to J1 playoffs. They lost the semi-final match to Tokushima Vortis by 1–1 (Chiba was placed 6th place and Tokushima was placed 3rd in the league; regulations stipulated that the higher-ranked club would advance to the final in the event of a draw.)

In the 2014 season, JEF United Chiba played in the promotion playoffs to J1 again. The club did not have to play in the semi-final (Chiba was 4th place but the 3rd place club named Giravanz Kitakyushu had a J League original stadium problem so Kitakyushu could not go to the promotion play off). In the final against Montedio Yamagata, they lost by 0–1, at Ajinomoto Stadium.

==== Back to the top flight ====
JEF United Chiba finished the 2025 J2 League season in third place putting them in the promotion play-offs. In the semi-finals, the club then faced off against RB Omiya Ardija, as the clock was in the 80th minute of the match with JEF United Chiba being 3–2 down, Makoto Himeno then equalised the game in the 83rd minute where 4 minutes later, Takashi Kawano scored the winner to secured a 4–3 win putting the club in the final. JEF United Chiba then won the promotion play-offs against Tokushima Vortis 1–0, returning to the J1 League after 17 years of absence from the top flight division.

== Team image ==
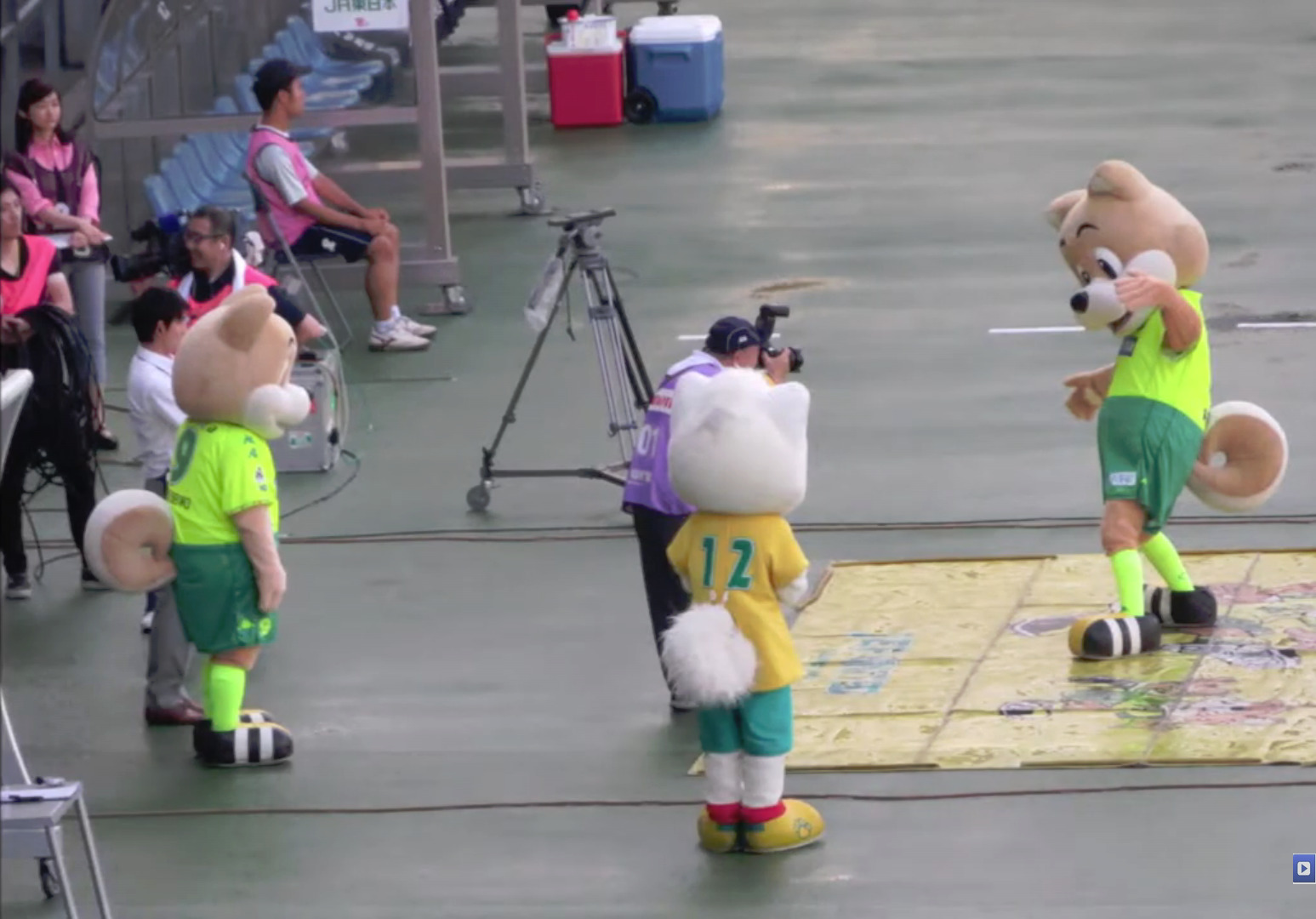
Akitas and Mina

=== Mascot ===
JEF United Ichihara's mascot characters are Akita Inu brothers named Jeffy and Unity. The squad number of Jeffy is 2 and that of Unity is 9. They are also joined by a third mascot named Mina, or Mina-chan. Her backstory was that she one day came to Soga Station (the railway station nearest to Fukuda Denshi Arena) and offered to work alongside Jeffy and Unity. Her squad number is 12.

=== Slogan ===
JEF United considers its philosophy to be encapsulated in its tagline "Win By All" since 2001.

=== Rivalries ===
==== Marunouchi Gosanke ====
Historically, JEF United's fiercest rivals have been Kashiwa Reysol and Urawa Reds, both close neighbors. The three were co-founders ("Original Eight") of the Japan Soccer League (JSL) in 1965, and spent most seasons in the top tier through the JSL era. Because of their former parent companies' headquarters being all based in Marunouchi, Tokyo, the three clubs were known as the Marunouchi Gosanke (丸の内御三家) and fixtures among them were known as the Marunouchi derbies.

==== Chiba derby ====
JEF United and Reysol first met in 1941 in ancient Kanto regional football league. The two clubs both now based in Chiba Prefecture, and their rivalry is known as the Chiba derby. They annually contest a pre-season friendly match well known as the Chibagin Cup (i.e., Chiba Bank Cup) since 1995.

== Stadium ==
It had played its home matches at Ichihara Seaside Stadium, but has since moved to the larger, football-specific and more conveniently located Fukuda Denshi Arena, which opened in Chiba during the 2005 season. The club had initially practiced at Urayasu, Chiba planning to base itself in Narashino, Chiba before opposition by those living around Akitsu Stadium forced it to be based in Ichihara. Since 2000, training has been held at Footpark Anesaki in Ichihara in normally. Since 1 October 2009, they made new practice place UNITED PARK near the Fukuda Denshi Arena.

== Kit and colours ==
The club colours of JEF United Chiba are yellow, green and red.

=== Kit evolution ===
Home - 1st
| 1993 - 1996 | 1997 - 1998 | 1999 - 2000 | 2001 | 2002 |
| 2003 | 2004 | 2005 | 2006 | 2007 |
| 2008 | 2009 | 2010 | 2011 | 2012 |
| 2013 | 2014 | 2015 | 2016 | 2017 |
| 2018 | 2019 | 2020 | 2021 | 2022 |
| 2023 | 2024 | 2025 - | | |

Away - 2nd
| 1993 - 1995 | 1996 | 1997 - 1998 | 1999 - 2000 | 2001 - 2002 |
| 2003 | 2004 | 2005 | 2006 | 2007 |
| 2008 | 2009 | 2010 | 2011 | 2012 |
| 2013 | 2014 | 2015 | 2016 | 2017 |
| 2018 | 2019 | 2020 | 2021 | 2022 |
| 2023 | 2024 | 2025 - | | |

Other Kits - 3rd
| 2012 3rd | 2015; 10th Anniversary of Fukuda Denshi Arena | 2016; 25th Anniversary | 2018; 15th Anniversary of Hometown Expansion | 2019; Factory Night View Ver. |
| 2022; Osimzhev Legend | 2022; OSIM Japan Legend | 20th Anniversary of Hometown Expansion | 2024 SP | |

== Affiliated clubs ==
=== Furukawa Electric Chiba ===
This was JEF's reserve team during the JSL years. They were formed in 1967 and were first promoted to the JSL Second Division in 1975. They still exist, although they are no longer affiliated on paper, and play in the Kanto Regional League. In 2008 they renamed themselves S.A.I. Ichihara and in 2011 they adopted the name Vonds Ichihara. Now separate from Furukawa Electric control, they aim to form its power base in Ichihara as JEF is now based in Chiba city.

=== JEF Reserves ===
JEF's reserve team played until 2011 in the Japan Football League, the third tier of Japanese football. But in 2011, the club announced the end of the B team because of financial problems.

== Honours ==
As Furukawa Electric SC (1946–1992), JEF United Ichihara (1992–2004), and JEF United Chiba (2005–present)

JEF United Chiba honours
| Honour | No. | Years |
|---|---|---|
| JSL Division 1 | 2 | 1976, 1985 |
| All Japan Works Football Championship | 3 | 1959, 1961, 1962 (shared) |
| All Japan Inter-City Football Championship | 4 | 1959, 1960, 1961, 1964 |
| Emperor's Cup | 4 | 1960, 1961, 1964 (shared), 1976 |
| JSL Cup / J.League Cup | 5 | 1977, 1982, 1986, 2005, 2006 |
| Japanese Super Cup | 1 | 1977 |
| Asian Club Championship | 1 | 1986 |

== Players ==
=== First-team squad ===
As of 16 September 2026.

Note: Flags indicate national team as defined under FIFA eligibility rules; some limited exceptions apply. Players may hold more than one non-FIFA nationality.

| No. | Pos. | Nation | Player |
|---|---|---|---|
| 2 | DF | JPN | Boniface Nduka (on loan from Vissel Kobe) |
| 3 | DF | JPN | Ryota Kuboniwa |
| 4 | MF | JPN | Taishi Taguchi (vice-captain) |
| 5 | MF | JPN | Yusuke Kobayashi |
| 6 | MF | BRA | Eduardo |
| 7 | FW | JPN | Kazuki Tanaka |
| 8 | MF | JPN | Takumi Tsukui |
| 9 | FW | JPN | Hiroto Goya |
| 11 | MF | JPN | Koki Yonekura |
| 13 | DF | JPN | Daisuke Suzuki (captain) |
| 14 | MF | JPN | Naoki Tsubaki |
| 15 | DF | JPN | Takayuki Mae |
| 18 | MF | JPN | Naohiro Sugiyama |
| 19 | GK | ESP | José Aurelio Suárez |
| 20 | FW | JPN | Daichi Ishikawa |
| 21 | GK | JPN | Haruto Usui |
| 22 | DF | JPN | Takahiro Iida |
| 23 | GK | JPN | Ryota Suzuki |
| 24 | DF | JPN | Koji Toriumi |
| 25 | MF | BRA | Matheus Índio |

| No. | Pos. | Nation | Player |
|---|---|---|---|
| 26 | DF | JPN | Yuta Ueda (on loan from Kyoto Sanga) |
| 28 | DF | JPN | Takashi Kawano |
| 29 | FW | JPN | Ken Yamura |
| 30 | FW | JPN | Takumi Matsumura |
| 31 | GK | JPN | Michiya Okamoto |
| 37 | MF | JPN | Makoto Himeno |
| 38 | MF | JPN | Taiki Amagasa |
| 39 | DF | JPN | Rikuto Ishio |
| 40 | DF | JPN | Yuzuta Sato ^{DSP} |
| 41 | MF | JPN | Takuya Yasui |
| 42 | MF | JPN | Zain Issaka |
| 44 | MF | JPN | Manato Shinada |
| 45 | FW | POR | Leonardo Rocha |
| 46 | DF | JPN | Shunji Saito ^{Type 2} |
| 47 | MF | JPN | Haru Ito ^{Type 2} |
| 55 | MF | JPN | Hinata Kida |
| 66 | DF | FIJ | Dan Hall |
| 67 | MF | JPN | Masaru Hidaka |
| 99 | FW | BRA | Erison |

=== Out on loan ===
Note: Flags indicate national team as defined under FIFA eligibility rules; some limited exceptions apply. Players may hold more than one non-FIFA nationality.

| No. | Pos. | Nation | Player |
|---|---|---|---|
| — | MF | JPN | Takuro Iwai (at Blaublitz Akita) |
| — | MF | JPN | Yuma Igari (at Vanraure Hachinohe) |
| — | MF | JPN | Gentaro Yoshida (at FC Osaka) |

| No. | Pos. | Nation | Player |
|---|---|---|---|
| — | FW | JPN | Masamichi Hayashi (at Ehime FC) |
| — | DF | JPN | Soshiro Tanida (at Reilac Shiga) |

== Management and staff ==
Club officials for 2025.

| Position | Name |
|---|---|
| Manager | (Japan) Yoshiyuki Kobayashi |
| Assistant manager | (Japan) Masataka Sakamoto |
| Coaches | (Japan) Masashi Owada (Japan) Shunta Nagai |
| Goalkeeper coach | (Japan) Motoki Kawahara |
| Physical coach | (Japan) Ryota Mizuguchi |
| Analyst | (Japan) Shunsuke Nakano |
| Interpreter | (Brazil) Fabricio |
| Chief trainer | (Japan) Yusuke Nakao |
| Athletic trainer | (Japan) Yuya Okamoto (Japan) Toshifumi Goto |
| Physiotherapist | (Japan) Naoki Akiyoshi |
| Competent | (Japan) Yuma Fukushima |
| Side affairs | (Japan) Yusuke Hata |
| Kit man | (Japan) Kosuke Tomitani |

== Award winners ==
As of the end of the 2025 season.

- J.League Best XI:
- J1 League

- (Japan) Yuki Abe (2005, 2006)
- (Bulgaria) Ilian Stoyanov (2005)

- J2 League
  - (Japan) Taishi Taguchi (2023)
  - (Japan) Hiiro Komori (2023, 2024)
  - (Japan) Kazuki Tanaka (2024)
- Individual Fair Play Award
  - (Japan) Satoru Yamagishi (2006)

== Former players ==
=== International capped players ===
JFA

- (Japan) Yuki Abe
- (Japan) Takayuki Chano
- (Japan) Toshiya Fujita
- (Japan) Naotake Hanyu
- (Japan) Nozomi Hiroyama
- (Japan) Shoji Jo
- (Japan) Kengo Kawamata
- (Japan) Naoya Kondo
- (Japan) Teruaki Kurobe
- (Japan) Seiichiro Maki
- (Japan) Tadatoshi Masuda
- (Japan) Koki Mizuno
- (Japan) Shigeyoshi Mochizuki
- (Japan) Takayuki Morimoto
- (Japan) Shinji Murai
- (Japan) Eisuke Nakanishi
- (Japan) Takafumi Ogura
- (Japan) Tomoyuki Sakai
- (Japan) Yuji Sakakura
- (Japan) Hisato Sato
- (Japan) Yuto Sato
- (Japan) Daisuke Suzuki
- (Japan) Takayuki Suzuki
- (Japan) Taishi Taguchi
- (Japan) Nobuhiro Takeda
- (Japan) Michihiro Yasuda
- (Japan) Koki Yonekura

AFC/ CAF/ OFC

- (Australia) Matthew Bingley
- (Australia) Jason Geria
- (Australia) Mark Milligan
- (North Korea) An Byong-jun
- (South Korea) Kim Dae-eui
- (South Korea) Choi Yong-Soo
- (Ghana) Owusu Benson
- (New Zealand) Wynton Rufer

UEFA

- (Austria) Mario Haas
- (Bosnia and Herzegovina) Edin Mujčin
- (Bosnia and Herzegovina) Mirko Hrgović
- (Bulgaria) Ilian Stoyanov
- (Czech Republic) Ivan Hašek
- (Czech Republic) Pavel Řehák
- (Germany) Pierre Littbarski
- (Germany) Frank Ordenewitz
- (Montenegro) Nenad Maslovar
- (Netherlands) Peter Bosz
- (Romania) Gabriel Popescu
- (Serbia) Rade Bogdanovic
- (Serbia) Nenad Đorđević
- (Slovakia) Ľubomír Moravčík
- (Slovenia) Željko Milinovič
- (Slovenia) Nejc Pečnik

CONMEBOL

- (Brazil) Kléber
- (Paraguay) Eduardo Aranda

== Managerial history ==
| Manager | Nationality | Tenure | |
| Manager | Nationality | Start | Finish |
|---|---|---|---|
| Yoshikazu Nagai | Japan | 1 January 1992 | 31 December1993 |
| Eijun Kiyokumo | Japan | 1 January 1994 | 31 December1995 |
| Yasuhiko Okudera | Japan | 1 January 1996 | 31 December 1996 |
| Jan Versleijen | Netherlands | 1 January 1997 | 31 December 1998 |
| Gert Engels | Germany | 1 February 1999 | 31 May 1999 |
| Nicolae Zamfir | Romania | 1 July 1999 | 7 August 2000 |
| Sugao Kambe (interim) | Japan | 10 August 2000 | 14 October 2000 |
| Zdenko Verdenik | Slovenia | 15 October 2000 | 31 December 2001 |
| Sugao Kambe (interim) | Japan | 1 December 2001 | 31 December 2001 |
| Jozef Vengloš | Slovakia | 1 January 2002 | 31 December 2002 |
| Ivica Osim | Bosnia and Herzegovina | 23 January 2003 | 19 July 2006 |
| Amar Osim | Bosnia and Herzegovina | 20 July 2006 | 31 December 2007 |
| Josip Kuže | Croatia | 1 February 2008 | 7 May 2008 |
| Shigeo Sawairi (interim) | Japan | 8 May 2008 | 18 May 2008 |
| Alex Miller | Scotland | 19 May 2008 | 28 July 2009 |
| Atsuhiko Ejiri | Japan | 1 August 2009 | 31 January 2011 |
| Dwight Lodeweges | Netherlands | 1 January 2011 | 21 October 2011 |
| Sugao Kambe | Japan | 21 October 2011 | 31 December 2011 |
| Takashi Kiyama | Japan | 1 February 2012 | 31 January 2013 |
| Jun Suzuki | Japan | 1 February 2013 | 23 June 2014 |
| Kazuo Saito (interim) | Japan | 24 June 2014 | 7 July 2014 |
| Takashi Sekizuka | Japan | 8 July 2014 | 25 July 2016 |
| Shigetoshi Hasebe (interim) | Japan | 25 July 2016 | 31 January 2017 |
| Juan Esnáider | Argentina | 1 February 2017 | 17 March 2019 |
| Atsuhiko Ejiri | Japan | 18 March 2019 | 31 January 2020 |
| Yoon Jong-hwan | South Korea | February 2020 | 31 January 2022 |
| Yoshiyuki Kobayashi | Japan | 1 February 2023 | Current |

== Season by season record ==
| Champions | Runners-up | Third place | Promoted | Relegated |

| Season | Division | Teams | Position | P | W (PKW / OTW) | D | L (PKL / OTL) | F | A | GD | Pts | Attendance/G | J.League Cup | Emperor's Cup |
|---|---|---|---|---|---|---|---|---|---|---|---|---|---|---|
JEF United Ichihara
| 1992 | – | – | – | | | | | | | | | – | Group stage | Quarter-final |
| 1993 | J1 | 10 | 8th | 36 | 14 | – | 22 | 51 | 67 | –16 | – | 20,273 | Group stage | Quarter-final |
| 1994 | J1 | 12 | 9th | 44 | 19 | – | 25 | 69 | 85 | –16 | – | 22,262 | 2nd round | 2nd round |
| 1995 | J1 | 14 | 5th | 52 | 28 (0 / -) | - | 20 (4 / -) | 97 | 91 | 6 | 88 | 15,418 | – | 1st round |
| 1996 | J1 | 16 | 9th | 30 | 13 (0 / -) | - | 16 (1 / -) | 45 | 47 | –2 | 40 | 12,008 | Group stage | 3rd round |
| 1997 | J1 | 17 | 13th | 32 | 6 (0 / 5) | - | 17 (1 / 3) | 43 | 66 | –23 | 28 | 5,693 | Quarter-finals | 4th round |
| 1998 | J1 | 18 | 16th | 34 | 8 (1 / 0) | - | 20 (1 / 4) | 49 | 75 | –26 | 25 | 5,365 | Final | 3rd round |
| 1999 | J1 | 16 | 13th | 30 | 6 (0 / 4) | 2 | 14 (0 / 4) | 41 | 56 | –15 | 28 | 5,774 | 2nd round | 3rd round |
| 2000 | J1 | 16 | 14th | 30 | 8 (0 / 1) | 2 | 14 (0 / 5) | 37 | 49 | -12 | 28 | 6,338 | 2nd round | Quarter-final |
| 2001 | J1 | 16 | 3rd | 30 | 14 (0 / 3) | 2 | 9 (0 / 2) | 60 | 54 | 6 | 50 | 7,818 | Quarter-finals | Quarter-final |
| 2002 | J1 | 16 | 7th | 30 | 12 (- / 1) | 3 | 14 | 38 | 42 | –4 | 41 | 7,897 | Quarter-finals | Semi-final |
| 2003 | J1 | 16 | 3rd | 30 | 15 | 8 | 7 | 57 | 38 | 19 | 53 | 9,709 | Group stage | Quarter-final |
| 2004 | J1 | 16 | 4th | 30 | 13 | 11 | 6 | 55 | 45 | 10 | 50 | 10,012 | Group stage | 4th round |
JEF United Chiba
| 2005 | J1 | 18 | 4th | 34 | 16 | 11 | 7 | 56 | 42 | 14 | 59 | 9,535 | Winner | 5th round |
| 2006 | J1 | 18 | 11th | 34 | 13 | 5 | 16 | 57 | 58 | –1 | 44 | 13,393 | Winner | 4th round |
| 2007 | J1 | 18 | 13th | 34 | 12 | 6 | 16 | 51 | 56 | –5 | 42 | 14,149 | Group stage | 4th round |
| 2008 | J1 | 18 | 15th | 34 | 10 | 8 | 16 | 36 | 53 | 17 | 38 | 14,084 | Quarter-finals | 4th round |
| 2009 | J1 | 18 | 18th | 34 | 5 | 12 | 17 | 32 | 56 | –24 | 27 | 14,730 | Group stage | 4th round |
| 2010 | J2 | 19 | 4th | 36 | 18 | 7 | 11 | 58 | 37 | 21 | 61 | 11,689 | Not eligible | 4th round |
| 2011 | J2 | 20 | 6th | 38 | 16 | 10 | 12 | 46 | 39 | 7 | 58 | 9,680 | Not eligible | Quarter-final |
| 2012 | J2 | 22 | 5th | 42 | 21 | 9 | 12 | 61 | 33 | 28 | 72 | 9,281 | Not eligible | Quarter-final |
| 2013 | J2 | 22 | 5th | 42 | 18 | 12 | 12 | 68 | 49 | 19 | 66 | 10,004 | Not eligible | 3rd round |
| 2014 | J2 | 22 | 3rd | 42 | 18 | 14 | 10 | 55 | 44 | 11 | 68 | 9,333 | Not eligible | Semi-final |
| 2015 | J2 | 22 | 9th | 42 | 15 | 12 | 15 | 50 | 45 | 5 | 57 | 10,725 | Not eligible | 3rd round |
| 2016 | J2 | 22 | 11th | 42 | 13 | 14 | 15 | 52 | 53 | –1 | 53 | 10,292 | Not eligible | 3rd round |
| 2017 | J2 | 22 | 6th | 42 | 20 | 8 | 14 | 70 | 58 | 12 | 68 | 9,983 | Not eligible | 3rd round |
| 2018 | J2 | 22 | 14th | 42 | 16 | 7 | 19 | 72 | 72 | 0 | 55 | 9,858 | Not eligible | 3rd round |
| 2019 | J2 | 22 | 17th | 42 | 10 | 13 | 19 | 46 | 64 | –18 | 43 | 9,701 | Not eligible | 2nd round |
| 2020 † | J2 | 22 | 14th | 42 | 15 | 8 | 19 | 47 | 51 | –4 | 53 | 2,778 | Not eligible | Did not qualify |
| 2021 † | J2 | 22 | 8th | 42 | 17 | 15 | 10 | 48 | 36 | 12 | 66 | 4,068 | Not eligible | 3rd round |
| 2022 | J2 | 22 | 10th | 42 | 17 | 10 | 15 | 44 | 42 | 2 | 61 | 5,775 | Not eligible | 2nd round |
| 2023 | J2 | 22 | 6th | 42 | 19 | 10 | 13 | 61 | 53 | 8 | 67 | 8,523 | Not eligible | 2nd round |
| 2024 | J2 | 20 | 7th | 38 | 19 | 4 | 15 | 67 | 48 | 19 | 61 | 10,431 | 1st round | Quarter-final |
| 2025 | J2 | 20 | 3rd | 38 | 20 | 9 | 9 | 56 | 34 | 22 | 69 | 15,549 | 1st round | 2nd round |
| 2026 | J1 | 10 | 10th | 18 | 3 | 0 | 12 (3 / -) | 18 | 31 | -13 | 12 | 14,085 | N/A | |
| 2026-27 | J1 | 20 | TBD | 38 | | | | | | | | | TBD | TBD |

Key

- Pos. = Position in league; P = Games played; W = Games won; D = Games drawn; L = Games lost; F = Goals scored; A = Goals conceded; GD = Goals difference; Pts = Points gained
- OTW / PKW = Overtime wins / Penalty kicks wins 1997 & 1998 seasons - 1999, 2000, 2001 & 2002 Overtime wins only
- OTL / PKL = Overtime losses / Penalty kicks losses 1997 and 1998 seasons - 1999, 2000 & 2001 Overtime losses only
- Attendance/G = Average home league attendance
- † 2020 & 2021 seasons attendances reduced by COVID-19 worldwide pandemic
- Source: J.League Data Site

== League history ==
- Division 1 (JSL Div. 1): 1965–1992
- Division 1 (J1): 1993–2009
- Division 2 (J2): 2010–2025
- Division 1 (J1): 2026–present

== Notes ==
Achievements
| Preceded by Daewoo Royals (South Korea) | Champions of Asia; 1986–87 | Succeeded by Yomiuri (Japan) |
