= 1993 Nagoya Grampus Eight season =

Nagoya Grampus Eight
1993 season
- Manager: Ryūzō Hiraki
- Stadium: Nagoya Mizuho Athletics Stadium (under repair)
- J.League: 9th
- Emperor's Cup: Quarterfinals
- J.League Cup: GL-B 4th
- Top goalscorer: League: Jorginho (9); All: Jorginho (10)
- Highest home attendance: 56,335 (vs Verdy Kawasaki, 9 June 1993, Tokyo National Stadium)
- Lowest home attendance: 10,898 (vs Kashima Antlers, 19 June 1993, Nagoya Mizuho Football Stadium)
- Average home league attendance: 19,858
Home colours	Away colours

1993 Nagoya Grampus Eight season

== Review and events ==
=== League results summary ===
Overall								Home						Away					
Pld	W	D	L	GF	GA	GD	Pts	W	D	L	GF	GA	GD	W	D	L	GF	GA	GD
36	12	0	24	48	66	−18	36	8	0	10	30	29	+1	4	0	14	18	37	−19

Source: J.LEAGUE OFFICIAL RECORD & DATA 1994. ISBN 4-09-102309-6.

=== League results by round ===
J.League Suntory series (first stage)
Round	1	2	3	4	5	6	7	8	9	10	11	12	13	14	15	16	17	18
Ground	A	A	H	H	A	H	A	H	A	H	H	A	H	A	H	A	H	A
Result	L	W	W	L	W	L	L	W	L	W	L	W	W	L	L	L	L	L
Position	10	8	6	8	6	8	9	8	8	8	9	7	6	7	8	8	9	9

Source: J.LEAGUE OFFICIAL RECORD & DATA 1994. ISBN 4-09-102309-6.
A = Away; H = Home; W = Win; D = Draw; L = Loss

J.League NICOS series (second stage)
Round	1	2	3	4	5	6	7	8	9	10	11	12	13	14	15	16	17	18
Ground	H	A	A	H	H	A	H	A	H	H	A	A	A	H	A	H	A	H
Result	L	L	L	W	L	L	L	L	W	W	L	W	L	L	L	L	L	W
Position	6	9	9	8	10	10	10	10	9	9	9	9	9	9	9	9	9	8

Source: J.LEAGUE OFFICIAL RECORD & DATA 1994. ISBN 4-09-102309-6.
A = Away; H = Home; W = Win; D = Draw; L = Loss

== Competitions ==
Competitions	Position
J.League	9th / 10 clubs
Emperor's Cup	Quarterfinals
J.League Cup	GL-B 4th / 6 clubs

== Domestic results ==
=== J.League ===
==== Suntory series ====
16 May 1993 1st-1	Kashima Antlers	5–0	Nagoya Grampus Eight	Kashima
16:00 JST (UTC+09)	Zico 25', 30', 63'; Alcindo 53', 64'	J. League	Pita (yellow card) 70'	Stadium: Kashima Soccer Stadium; Attendance: 10,898; Referee: Masahiro Sogawa; Assistant referees: Hisashi Uemura, Masahiro Katagiri

19 May 1993 1st-2	Urawa Red Diamonds	0–3	Nagoya Grampus Eight	Saitama
19:00 JST (UTC+09)		J. League	Moriyama 34', 48'; Jorginho (yellow card) 74'; Gotō 85'	Stadium: Urawa Komaba Stadium; Attendance: 9,259; Referee: Tetsuya Hamana; Assistant referees: Mitsuru Satō, Toshiyuki Mayuzumi; Fourth official: Morihiko Yamaji

22 May 1993 1st-3	Nagoya Grampus Eight	1–1 (sudden-death) (a.e.t.) (4–3 p)	Yokohama Marinos	Nagoya
15:02 JST (UTC+09)	Garça (yellow card) 63'; Sawairi 77'	J. League	Ihara (yellow card) 17'; Everton 22'; Noda (yellow card) 49'; Díaz (yellow card) 103'	Stadium: Nagoya Mizuho Football Stadium; Attendance: 11,267; Referee: Martin Bodenham; Assistant referees: Fumikazu Shioyazono, Yoshimi Ogawa; Fourth official: Takayoshi Kashino
	Penalties
	Yonekura (penalty missed); Sawairi (penalty scored); Moriyama (penalty scored); Lineker (penalty scored); Fujikawa (penalty scored)		(penalty missed) Everton; (penalty scored) Ihara; (penalty scored) Bisconti; (penalty scored) Díaz; (penalty missed) Miura

26 May 1993 1st-4	Nagoya Grampus Eight	1–2	Yokohama Flügels	Nagoya
19:01 JST (UTC+09)	Garça (yellow card) 76'; Lineker 89'	J. League	Maeda 47'; Edu 60' (pen.)	Stadium: Nagoya Mizuho Football Stadium; Attendance: 12,544; Referee: Hitoshi Yamada; Assistant referees: Toshiyuki Mayuzumi, Yoshio Sawada; Fourth official: Takayoshi Kashino

29 May 1993 1st-5	Shimizu S-Pulse	0–0 (sudden-death) (a.e.t.) (5–6 p)	Nagoya Grampus Eight	Tokyo National Stadium
18:59 JST (UTC+09)		J. League		Attendance: 50,475; Referee: Masahiro Sogawa; Assistant referees: Keiichi Sunakawa, Takeshi Ōkura; Fourth official: Takuji Fukazawa
	Penalties
	Toninho (penalty missed); Hasegawa (penalty scored); Marco Antonio (penalty missed); Ōenoki (penalty scored); Sawanobori (penalty scored); Ōta (penalty scored); Hiraoka (penalty scored); Naitō (penalty missed)		(penalty scored) Fujikawa; (penalty missed) Iijima; (penalty scored) Lineker; (penalty scored) Gotō; (penalty missed) Yonekura; (penalty scored) Asano; (penalty scored) Nakanishi; (penalty scored) Tsuruta

2 June 1993 1st-6	Nagoya Grampus Eight	1–4	Sanfrecce Hiroshima	Nagoya
19:00 JST (UTC+09)	Tsuruta (yellow card) 34'; Pita 55' (pen.); Garça (yellow card) 64'	J. League	Takagi 6'; Kojima 47'; Kazama 72'; Moriyasu 78'	Stadium: Nagoya Mizuho Football Stadium; Attendance: 11,466; Referee: Kōetsu Kikuchi; Assistant referees: Yoshio Sawada, Yasushi Tsuchimoto; Fourth official: Takayoshi Kashino

5 June 1993 1st-7	Gamba Osaka	3–1	Nagoya Grampus Eight	Suma-ku
18:30 JST (UTC+09)	Kajino (yellow card) 8'; Nagashima 15', 37', 84'; Ishii (yellow card) 48'	J. League	Jorginho 9'	Stadium: Kobe Universiade Memorial Stadium; Attendance: 38,304; Referee: Shinichirō Obata; Assistant referees: Yoshitsugu Katayama, Toyohide Kanda; Fourth official: Kazuya Yanagisawa

9 June 1993 1st-8	Nagoya Grampus Eight	3–1	Verdy Kawasaki	Tokyo
19:04 JST (UTC+09)	Sawairi 15', 39'; Ogawa (yellow card) 50'; Yonekura 59'; Egawa (yellow card) 89'	J. League	Totsuka 70'	Stadium: Tokyo National Stadium; Attendance: 56,335; Referee: Tetsuya Hamana; Assistant referees: Toshiyuki Mayuzumi, Masahiro Katagiri; Fourth official: Takayoshi Kashino

12 June 1993 1st-9	JEF United Ichihara	3–1	Nagoya Grampus Eight	Atsubetsu-ku
12:35 JST (UTC+09)	Ejiri 32'; Pavel 46'; Niimura 57'; Nakanishi (yellow card) 58'; Sakakura (yellow card) 67'; Mysliveček (yellow card) 89'	J. League	Gotō 45'	Stadium: Sapporo Atsubetsu Stadium; Attendance: 20,947; Referee: Martin Bodenham; Assistant referees: Shizuo Takada, Hiroshi Fukuda; Fourth official: Kenichi Koshiyama

16 June 1993 1st-10	Nagoya Grampus Eight	3–1	Urawa Red Diamonds	Nagoya
19:00 JST (UTC+09)	Jorginho 25'; Egawa 49'; Sawairi 61'	J. League	Motoyoshi 62'	Stadium: Nagoya Mizuho Football Stadium; Attendance: 12,227; Referee: Hitoshi Yamada; Assistant referees: Yoshio Sawada, Yoshikazu Hiroshima; Fourth official: Takayoshi Kashino

19 June 1993 1st-11	Nagoya Grampus Eight	0–4	Kashima Antlers	Nagoya
19:02 JST (UTC+09)	Yonekura (yellow card) 56'; Havenaar (yellow card) 78'	J. League	Alcindo 18', 31', 57'; Hasegawa 78'; Honda (yellow card) 81'	Stadium: Nagoya Mizuho Football Stadium; Attendance: 10,898; Referee: Yōtarō Moritsu; Assistant referees: Kazuya Yanagisawa, Yasushi Tsuchimoto; Fourth official: Takayoshi Kashino

23 June 1993 1st-12	Yokohama Flügels	1–2 (sudden-death) (a.e.t.)	Nagoya Grampus Eight	Kumamoto
19:03 JST (UTC+09)	Maeda 56'	J. League	Iijima (yellow card) 74'; Mori 75' (o.g.); Hirano 94'	Stadium: Kumamoto Suizenji Stadium; Attendance: 15,328; Referee: Martin Bodenham; Assistant referees: Shizuo Takada, Hideaki Harada; Fourth official: Takatsugu Nakayama

26 June 1993 1st-13	Nagoya Grampus Eight	3–1	Shimizu S-Pulse	Gifu
15:04 JST (UTC+09)	Fujikawa (yellow card) 56'; Tsuruta 63'; Yonekura (yellow card) 82'; Sawairi 85'; Gotō 89'	J. League	Saito (yellow card) 11'; Hasegawa 15'; Naitō (yellow card) 54'; Sawanobori (yellow card) 80'	Stadium: Gifu Nagaragawa Stadium; Attendance: 29,102; Referee: Hiroyuki Umemoto; Assistant referees: Yoshikazu Hiroshima, Yasushi Tsuchimoto; Fourth official: Takayoshi Kashino

30 June 1993 1st-14	Sanfrecce Hiroshima	2–0	Nagoya Grampus Eight	Hiroshima
19:01 JST (UTC+09)	Moriyasu 39', (yellow card) 66'; Takagi 62'; Katanosaka (yellow card) 88'	J. League	Yonekura (yellow card) 81'	Stadium: Hiroshima Stadium; Attendance: 9,709; Referee: Martin Bodenham; Assistant referees: Kōetsu Kikuchi, Masanori Watanabe; Fourth official: Mamoru Ueda

3 July 1993 1st-15	Nagoya Grampus Eight	2–3	Gamba Osaka	Suzuka
18:30 JST (UTC+09)	Tsuruta (yellow card) 29'; Gotō 64'; Pita 71'; Egawa (yellow card) 73'	J. League	Müller 51', 85'; Nagashima 87'	Stadium: Mie Sports Garden; Attendance: 12,167; Referee: Tetsuya Hamana; Assistant referees: Takeshi Ōkura, Yoshimi Ogawa; Fourth official: Takayoshi Kashino

7 July 1993 1st-16	Verdy Kawasaki	5–0	Nagoya Grampus Eight	Kawasaki
19:02 JST (UTC+09)	Kitazawa 6', 13'; Nagai 19'; Hanssen 71'; Miura 83'	J. League	Jorginho (yellow card) 27'; Egawa (yellow card) 57'; Yonekura (yellow card) 84'	Stadium: Kawasaki Todoroki Stadium; Attendance: 10,225; Referee: Masayoshi Okada; Assistant referees: Yū Nakamura, Noboru Ishiyama; Fourth official: Mineo Takada

10 July 1993 1st-17	Nagoya Grampus Eight	0–1	JEF United Ichihara	Gifu
18:34 JST (UTC+09)		J. League	Littbarski 89'	Stadium: Gifu Nagaragawa Stadium; Attendance: 26,370; Referee: Hiroyuki Umemoto; Assistant referees: Yoshikazu Hiroshima, Yoshimi Ogawa; Fourth official: Takayoshi Kashino

14 July 1993 1st-18	Yokohama Marinos	1–0	Nagoya Grampus Eight	Yokohama
19:01 JST (UTC+09)	Koizumi 14'; Zaizen (yellow card) 21'; Jinno (yellow card) 51'; Hirakawa (yellow card) 69'	J. League	Yonekura (yellow card) 50'	Stadium: Yokohama Mitsuzawa Football Stadium; Attendance: 12,280; Referee: Fumikazu Shioyazono; Assistant referees: Noboru Ishiyama, Naotsugu Fuse

==== NICOS series ====
24 July 1993 2nd-1	Nagoya Grampus Eight	1–2	Yokohama Flügels	Kobe
18:31 JST (UTC+09)	Jorginho 29'; Garça (yellow card) 74'; Iijima (yellow card) 82'	J. League	Maeda 8'; Edu 44'	Stadium: Kobe Universiade Memorial Stadium; Attendance: 38,757; Referee: Kenji Tanaka; Assistant referees: Yasuhiro Hemmi, Toyohide Kanda; Fourth official: Keiji Hayashi

31 July 1993 2nd-2	Kashima Antlers	1–1 (sudden-death) (a.e.t.) (5–3 p)	Nagoya Grampus Eight	Kashima
18:34 JST (UTC+09)	Ono (yellow card) 4'; Santos 34'; Ishii (yellow card) 69'; Gaya (yellow card) 112'	J. League	Garça (yellow card) 5'; Gotō 24'; Yonekura (yellow card) 40'; Jorginho (yellow card) 54'; Iijima (yellow card) 60' (yellow-red card) 89'; Shimamura (yellow card) 66'	Stadium: Kashima Soccer Stadium; Attendance: 14,747; Referee: Martin Bodenham; Assistant referees: Yū Nakamura, Noboru Ishiyama; Fourth official: Ichirō Inukai
	Penalties
	Santos (penalty scored); Kurosaki (penalty scored); Akita (penalty scored); Sugiyama (penalty scored); Alcindo (penalty scored)		(penalty scored) Fujikawa; (penalty missed) Sawairi; (penalty scored) Tsuruta; (penalty scored) Ogawa

4 August 1993 2nd-3	JEF United Ichihara	5–2	Nagoya Grampus Eight	Ichihara
19:01 JST (UTC+09)	Gotō 20'; Pavel 28' (pen.), 83'; Otze 42', 75'; H. Miyazawa (yellow card) 70'; M. Miyazawa (yellow card) 73'	J. League	Asano 8'; Ogawa (red card) 27'; Fujikawa (yellow card) 30'; Okayama 68'	Stadium: Ichihara Stadium; Attendance: 10,551; Referee: Tetsuya Hamana; Assistant referees: Hiroshi Fukuda, Toshiyuki Mayuzumi; Fourth official: Junichi Kurisawa

7 August 1993 2nd-4	Nagoya Grampus Eight	4–1	Urawa Red Diamonds	Suzuka
18:31 JST (UTC+09)	Taniguchi (yellow card) 21'; Tsuruta 29'; Garça (yellow card) 43', (goal) 89'; Shimamura 48', (yellow card) 88'; Hirano 56', (yellow card) 89'; Jorginho (yellow card) 59'	J. League	Uehara 1', (yellow card) 88'; Hori (yellow card) 17'; Trivisonno (yellow card) 17'; Sawada (yellow card) 30'	Stadium: Mie Sports Garden; Attendance: 11,858; Referee: Martin Bodenham; Assistant referees: Fumikazu Shioyazono, Kōetsu Kikuchi; Fourth official: Takayoshi Kashino

14 August 1993 2nd-5	Nagoya Grampus Eight	0–1 (sudden-death) (a.e.t.)	Shimizu S-Pulse	Gifu
19:04 JST (UTC+09)	Yonekura (yellow card) 75'	J. League	Kato (yellow card) 83'; Tajima 94'	Stadium: Gifu Nagaragawa Stadium; Attendance: 25,301; Referee: Kenji Tanaka; Assistant referees: Yasuhiro Hemmi, Yoshio Sawada; Fourth official: Takayoshi Kashino

19 August 1993 2nd-6	Verdy Kawasaki	3–1	Nagoya Grampus Eight	Tokyo
19:03 JST (UTC+09)	Kato (yellow card) 43'; Miura 67' (pen.); 72' (o.g.); Nakamura 89'	J. League	Ogawa 5'; Egawa (yellow card) 33'; Jorginho (yellow card) 64'	Stadium: Tokyo National Stadium; Attendance: 54,977; Referee: Kōetsu Kikuchi; Assistant referees: Hiroshi Fukuda, Kimio Izaki; Fourth official: Hideaki Ishii

25 August 1993 2nd-7	Nagoya Grampus Eight	0–2	Gamba Osaka	Hakata-ku
19:02 JST (UTC+09)	Hirano (yellow card) 73'; Ogawa (yellow card) 85'	J. League	Campos (yellow card) 11'; Wada 39'; Matsuyama 77'	Stadium: Hakatanomori Athletic Stadium; Attendance: 27,356; Referee: Kiichirō Tachi; Assistant referees: Masato Nogami, Hideaki Harada; Fourth official: Hiroyuki Izumi

28 August 1993 2nd-8	Yokohama Marinos	2–0	Nagoya Grampus Eight	Yokohama
18:33 JST (UTC+09)	Jinno 13', (yellow card) 43'; Omura (yellow card) 17'; Bisconti 47'; Nagayama (yellow card) 59'; Ai (yellow card) 59'; Miura (yellow card) 71'	J. League	Takamoto (yellow card) 61'; Iijima (yellow card) 67'; Okayama (red card) 77'	Stadium: Yokohama Mitsuzawa Football Stadium; Attendance: 14,450; Referee: Kenji Tanaka; Assistant referees: Noboru Ishiyama, Takashi Kunori; Fourth official: Mitsuo Ōno

3 September 1993 2nd-9	Nagoya Grampus Eight	1–0	Sanfrecce Hiroshima	Nagoya
19:01 JST (UTC+09)	Ogawa (yellow card) 25'; Yonekura 50'	J. League		Stadium: Nagoya Mizuho Football Stadium; Attendance: 11,016; Referee: Hideo Kikuchi; Assistant referees: Yoshio Sawada, Yasushi Tsuchimoto; Fourth official: Takayoshi Kashino

6 November 1993 2nd-10	Nagoya Grampus Eight	2–1	Kashima Antlers	Nagoya Mizuho Football Stadium
16:04 JST (UTC+09)	Sawairi 7'; Jorginho 61'	J. League	Manaka 77'	Attendance: 11,584; Referee: Yōtarō Moritsu; Assistant referees: Kazuya Yanagisawa, Yoshimi Ogawa; Fourth official: Takayoshi Kashino

10 November 1993 2nd-11	Yokohama Flügels	1–0	Nagoya Grampus Eight	Nagasaki Stadium
19:04 JST (UTC+09)	Maezono 83'	J. League		Attendance: 13,205; Referee: Juan Carlos Crespi; Assistant referees: Masayoshi Okada, Hideaki Harada; Fourth official: Shigehisa Yamaguchi

13 November 1993 2nd-12	Urawa Red Diamonds	0–5	Nagoya Grampus Eight	Urawa Komaba Stadium
15:03 JST (UTC+09)		J. League	Jorginho 3', 62'; Elivélton 28'; Garça 40' (pen.), 44'	Attendance: 9,347; Referee: Tetsuya Hamana; Assistant referees: Naotsugu Fuse, Hisashi Uemura; Fourth official: Satoru Tanigawa

17 November 1993 2nd-13	Shimizu S-Pulse	2–0	Nagoya Grampus Eight	Kusanagi Athletic Stadium
19:00 JST (UTC+09)	Edu 29'; Hasegawa 34'	J. League		Attendance: 16,889; Referee: Fumikazu Shioyazono; Assistant referees: Toyohide Kanda, Yoshimi Ogawa; Fourth official: Teruhito Kudō

20 November 1993 2nd-14	Nagoya Grampus Eight	1–2	Verdy Kawasaki	Gifu Nagaragawa Stadium
19:05 JST (UTC+09)	Jorginho 35'	J. League	Bismarck 63'; Miura 85'	Attendance: 26,584; Referee: Yōtarō Moritsu; Assistant referees: Kazunori Okada, Yasuhiro Hemmi; Fourth official: Takahiko Sugiyama

27 November 1993 2nd-15	Gamba Osaka	2–2 (a.s.d.e.t.) (6–5 p)	Nagoya Grampus Eight	Kyoto Nishikyogoku Stadium
15:01 JST (UTC+09)	Ishii 68'; Matsuyama 86'	J. League	Moriyama 18'; Gotō 83'	Attendance: 13,069; Referee: Shinichirō Obata; Assistant referees: Yoshitsugu Katayama, Yoshikazu Hiroshima; Fourth official: Hiroyuki Ishida
	Penalties
	(penalty missed) Isogai; (penalty scored) Matsuyama; (penalty scored) Wada; (penalty scored) Matsunami; (penalty scored) Kondō; (penalty scored) Shimada; (penalty scored) Aleinikov		(penalty scored) Fujikawa; (penalty scored) Jorginho; (penalty scored) Garça; (penalty scored) Elivélton; (penalty missed) Gotō; (penalty scored) Asano; (penalty missed) Egawa

1 December 1993 2nd-16	Nagoya Grampus Eight	1–2	Yokohama Marinos	Nagoya Mizuho Football Stadium
19:04 JST (UTC+09)	Jorginho 15'	J. League	Díaz 30'; Mizunuma 56'	Attendance: 11,446; Referee: Kenji Tanaka; Assistant referees: Yoshikazu Hiroshima, Yoshimi Ogawa; Fourth official: Takayoshi Kashino

8 December 1993 2nd-17	Sanfrecce Hiroshima	1–0 (a.s.d.e.t.)	Nagoya Grampus Eight	Hiroshima Stadium
19:03 JST (UTC+09)	Černý 106'	J. League		Attendance: 9,672; Referee: Juan Carlos Crespi; Assistant referees: Fumikazu Shioyazono, Yoshikazu Hiroshima; Fourth official: Shinji Saga

15 December 1993 2nd-18	Nagoya Grampus Eight	6–0	JEF United Ichihara	Nagoya Mizuho Football Stadium
19:02 JST (UTC+09)	Moriyama 22'; Mori 33'; Hirano 41', 58'; Jorginho 52'; Elivélton 83'	J. League		Attendance: 11,173; Referee: Yoshimi Ogawa; Assistant referees: Takeshi Ōkura, Yasushi Tsuchimoto; Fourth official: Takayoshi Kashino

=== Emperor's Cup ===
5 December 1993 1st Round	Nagoya Grampus Eight	2–1 (a.e.t.)	Júbilo Iwata	Gifu Nagaragawa Stadium
: JST (UTC+09)	Kosugi ?'; Hirano ?'		Ōishi ?'	Attendance: 27,300

11 December 1993 2nd Round	Nagoya Grampus Eight	3–2	Gamba Osaka	Kyoto Nishikyogoku Stadium
: JST (UTC+09)	Yonekura ?', ?'; Jorginho ?'		Yamaguchi ?'; Matsuyama ?'	Attendance: 13,211

19 December 1993 Quarterfinals	Kashima Antlers	5–3 (a.e.t.)	Nagoya Grampus Eight	Expo '70 Commemorative Stadium
: JST (UTC+09)	Alcindo 39', 70'; Hasegawa 49', 100'; Kurosaki 92'		Moriyama 6'; Mori 25'; Asano 36'	Attendance: 19,409

==== J.League Cup ====
10 September 1993 GL-B-1	Shimizu S-Pulse	2–1	Nagoya Grampus Eight	Suruga-ku
19:01 JST (UTC+09)	Marco Antonio (yellow card) 9', (goal) 44'; Edu 75', (yellow card) 87'	J. League	Iijima (yellow card) 35'; Lineker 76'; Mori (yellow card) 81'	Stadium: Kusanagi Athletic Stadium; Attendance: 17,932; Referee: Shizuo Takada; Assistant referees: Hisashi Uemura, Yoshimi Ogawa; Fourth official: Teruhito Kudō

GL-B-2	bye

18 September 1993 GL-B-3	Nagoya Grampus Eight	1–3	Júbilo Iwata	Nagoya
18:01 JST (UTC+09)	Garça (yellow card) 55'; Okayama 81'	J. League	Walter (yellow card) 4'; Endō 31'; Iwasaki (yellow card) 35'; Vanenburg 67'; Carlos Alberto 77'	Stadium: Nagoya Minato Stadium; Attendance: 15,113; Referee: Hiroyuki Umemoto; Assistant referees: Yasushi Tsuchimoto, Yoshimi Ogawa; Fourth official: Takayoshi Kashino

25 September 1993 GL-B-4	Nagoya Grampus Eight	4–1	Yokohama Marinos	Tokyo
18:31 JST (UTC+09)	Lineker 16' (pen.), 56'; Garça (yellow card) 59'; Yonekura (yellow card) 74'; Tsuruta (yellow card) 79'; Hirano 82'; Egawa 88'	J. League	Suzuki (yellow card) 44'; Díaz 89' (pen.)	Stadium: Tokyo National Stadium; Attendance: 52,063; Referee: Kōetsu Kikuchi; Assistant referees: Noboru Ishiyama, Naotsugu Fuse; Fourth official: Takayoshi Kashino

2 October 1993 GL-B-5	Urawa Red Diamonds	3–2	Nagoya Grampus Eight	Ōmiya-ku
18:30 JST (UTC+09)	Hirose 23'; Mizuuchi 37'; Rummenigge 51', (yellow card) 61'; Nishino (yellow card) 56'	J. League	Ogawa (yellow card) 13'; Okayama 47'; Pita (yellow card) 63'; Lineker 73' (pen.)	Stadium: Omiya Football Stadium; Attendance: 9,470; Referee: Kōetsu Kikuchi; Assistant referees: Toshiyuki Mayuzumi, Naotsugu Fuse; Fourth official: Izumi Okada

GL-B-6	bye

16 October 1993 GL-B-7	Nagoya Grampus Eight	1–0 (sudden-death) (a.e.t.)	Yokohama Flügels	Nagoya
19:02 JST (UTC+09)	Garça (yellow card) 106'; Pita 110'	J. League	Takada (yellow card) 31' (yellow-red card) 82'	Stadium: Nagoya Minato Stadium; Attendance: 14,560; Referee: Kenji Tanaka; Assistant referees: Kazuo Kakihana, Yoshimi Ogawa; Fourth official: Takayoshi Kashino

== Player statistics ==
No.	Pos	Nat	Player	Total		J-League		Emperor's Cup		J-League Cup	
No.	Pos	Nat	Player	Apps	Goals	Apps	Goals	Apps	Goals	Apps	Goals
	GK	(Netherlands) NED	Dido Havenaar	19	0	19	0	0	0	0	0
	GK	(Japan) JPN	Yūji Itō	25	0	17	0	3	0	5	0
	GK	(Japan) JPN	Ken Ishikawa	0	0	0	0	0	0	0	0
	GK	(Japan) JPN	Tsuneyoshi Ōsaki	0	0	0	0	0	0	0	0
	GK	(Japan) JPN	Hiroki Mizuhara	0	0	0	0	0	0	0	0
	DF	(Japan) JPN	Hisataka Fujikawa	39	0	33	0	3	0	3	0
	DF	(Japan) JPN	Shigemitsu Egawa	32	2	24	1	3	0	5	1
	DF	(Brazil) BRA	Garça	36	3	29	3	3	0	4	0
	DF	(Japan) JPN	Norifumi Takamoto	10	0	9	0	0	0	1	0
	DF	(Japan) JPN	Toshiyuki Kosugi	23	1	20	0	2	1	1	0
	DF	(Japan) JPN	Kazuhisa Iijima	21	0	18	0	0	0	3	0
	DF	(Japan) JPN	Shinji Ishihara	0	0	0	0	0	0	0	0
	DF	(Japan) JPN	Takayuki Akiyama	0	0	0	0	0	0	0	0
	DF	(Japan) JPN	Seiichi Ogawa	40	1	32	1	3	0	5	0
	DF	(Japan) JPN	Naoki Mori	11	2	3	1	3	1	5	0
	DF	(Japan) JPN	Kazuhito Yamamoto	0	0	0	0	0	0	0	0
	DF	(Japan) JPN	Seiji Kubo	0	0	0	0	0	0	0	0
	DF	(Japan) JPN	Kei Taniguchi	7	0	5	0	0	0	2	0
	DF	(Japan) JPN	Mitsutoshi Tsushima	1	0	1	0	0	0	0	0
	MF	(Brazil) BRA	Pita	10	3	8	2	0	0	2	1
	MF	(Brazil) BRA	Jorginho	31	10	27	9	3	1	1	0
	MF	(Japan) JPN	Tetsuya Asano	23	2	20	1	3	1	0	0
	MF	(Japan) JPN	Michihiro Tsuruta	28	2	24	2	0	0	4	0
	MF	(Japan) JPN	Nariyasu Yasuhara	5	0	3	0	0	0	2	0
	MF	(Japan) JPN	Tetsuo Nakanishi	6	0	4	0	2	0	0	0
	MF	(Japan) JPN	Takehiro Iwagiri	0	0	0	0	0	0	0	0
	MF	(Japan) JPN	Makoto Yonekura	39	4	31	2	3	2	5	0
	MF	(Japan) JPN	Masashi Shimamura	14	1	14	1	0	0	0	0
	MF	(Japan) JPN	Yoshimi Hamasaki	0	0	0	0	0	0	0	0
	MF	(Japan) JPN	Hideyoshi Akita	0	0	0	0	0	0	0	0
	FW	(England) ENG	Lineker	12	5	7	1	0	0	5	4
	FW	(Japan) JPN	Shigeo Sawairi	24	6	22	6	0	0	2	0
	FW	(Japan) JPN	Akiyoshi Yoshida	5	0	5	0	0	0	0	0
	FW	(Japan) JPN	Yasuyuki Moriyama	13	5	12	4	1	1	0	0
	FW	(Japan) JPN	Tarō Gotō (Note: His position was MF in Suntory series.)	21	6	21	6	0	0	0	0
	FW	(Japan) JPN	Kimihiko Kiyono	0	0	0	0	0	0	0	0
	FW	(Japan) JPN	Kazutoshi Ishiyama	0	0	0	0	0	0	0	0
	FW	(Japan) JPN	Tetsuya Okayama (Note: His position was MF in Suntory series.)	10	3	7	1	0	0	3	2
	FW	(Japan) JPN	Minehide Kimura	0	0	0	0	0	0	0	0
	FW	(Japan) JPN	Hiroshi Asō	0	0	0	0	0	0	0	0
	FW	(Japan) JPN	Takashi Hirano	25	6	19	4	3	1	3	1
	FW	(Brazil) BRA	Elivélton †	12	2	9	2	3	0	0	0

- † player(s) joined the team after the opening of this season.

== Transfers ==
In:

No.	Pos.	Nation	Player
—	GK	JPN	Hiroki Mizuhara (from Yokkaichi Chuo Technical High School)
—	GK	JPN	Tsuneyoshi Ōsaki (from Nagoya Grampus Eight youth)
—	FW	ENG	Gary Lineker (from Tottenham Hotspur)
—	DF	JPN	Norifumi Takamoto (from Toshiba)
—	DF	JPN	Shinji Ishihara (from Tokai University)
—	DF	JPN	Takayuki Akiyama (from Rissho University)
—	DF	JPN	Kei Taniguchi (from Minamiuwa High School)
—	DF	JPN	Mitsutoshi Tsushima (from Shimizu Commercial High School)
—	MF	JPN	Hideyoshi Akita (from Sakuyo High School)
—	MF	JPN	Takehiro Iwagiri (from Senshu University)
—	MF	JPN	Yoshimi Hamasaki (from Shoin High School)
—	FW	JPN	Takashi Hirano (from Shimizu Commercial High School)
—	FW	JPN	Hiroshi Asō (from Maebashi Commercial High School)
—	MF	BRA	Pita (from Fujita)

Out:

No.	Pos.	Nation	Player
—	GK	JPN	Akiyoshi Ōhashi
—	DF	JPN	Otohiko Kiyono
—	FW	JPN	Takafumi Ogura (loan to Excelsior)
—	MF	BRA	Pedro
—	FW	BRA	Marcio
—	FW	JPN	Shinji Ogura
—	MF	JPN	Yūji Sugano

== Transfers during the season ==
=== In ===
- (Brazil) Elivélton (from São Paulo FC on October)

=== Out ===
- (Brazil) Pita (on October)

== Other pages ==
- (in Japanese) J. League official site
- (in Japanese) Nagoya Grampus official site
