= 1992 Nagoya Grampus Eight season =

Nagoya Grampus Eight
1992 season
- Manager: Ryūzō Hiraki
- Stadium: Nagoya Mizuho Athletics Stadium (under repair)
- Emperor's Cup: 1st Round
- J.League Cup: Semifinals
- Top goalscorer: League: All: Takafumi Ogura (5)

The 1992 Nagoya Grampus Eight season was the club's first season as members of the J.League. Due to the transition period between the Japan Soccer League and the J.League no league games were played, however Nagoya Grampus Eight did take part in the newly founded J.League Cup and Emperor's Cup, reaching the First Round of the Emperor's Cup and the Semi-Final of the J.League Cup.

== Squad ==
Note: Flags indicate national team as defined under FIFA eligibility rules; some limited exceptions apply. Players may hold more than one non-FIFA nationality.

No.	Pos.	Nation	Player
—	GK	(Netherlands) NED	Dirk Havenaar (Note: His name is Dido Havenaar. But his name is listed with Dirk Havenaar on J.League official books in 1992.)
—	GK	(Japan) JPN	Akiyoshi Ōhashi
—	GK	(Japan) JPN	Yūji Itō
—	GK	(Japan) JPN	Ken Ishikawa
—	DF	(Japan) JPN	Shigemitsu Egawa
—	DF	(Japan) JPN	Garça
—	DF	(Japan) JPN	Kazuhisa Iijima
—	DF	(Japan) JPN	Otohiko Kiyono
—	DF	(Japan) JPN	Toshiyuki Kosugi
—	DF	(Japan) JPN	Seiji Kubo
—	DF	(Japan) JPN	Naoki Mori
—	DF	(Japan) JPN	Seiichi Ogawa
—	DF	(Japan) JPN	Kazuhito Yamamoto
—	MF	(Japan) JPN	Tetsuya Asano
—	MF	(Japan) JPN	Hisataka Fujikawa
—	MF	(Brazil) BRA	Jorginho
—	MF	(Japan) JPN	Tetsuo Nakanishi

No.	Pos.	Nation	Player
—	MF	(Japan) JPN	Tetsuya Okayama
—	MF	(Japan) JPN	Masashi Shimamura
—	MF	(Japan) JPN	Yūji Sugano
—	MF	(Japan) JPN	Tarō Gotō
—	MF	(Japan) JPN	Michihiro Tsuruta
—	MF	(Japan) JPN	Nariyasu Yasuhara
—	MF	(Japan) JPN	Makoto Yonekura
—	FW	(Japan) JPN	Shinji Ogura
—	FW	(Japan) JPN	Shigeo Sawairi
—	FW	(Japan) JPN	Akiyoshi Yoshida
—	FW	(Japan) JPN	Yasuyuki Moriyama
—	FW	(Brazil) BRA	Pedro
—	FW	(Brazil) BRA	Marcio
—	FW	(Japan) JPN	Kimihiko Kiyono
—	FW	(Japan) JPN	Takafumi Ogura
—	FW	(Japan) JPN	Kazutoshi Ishiyama
—	FW	(Japan) JPN	Minehide Kimura

== Transfers ==
In: Note: Flags indicate national team as defined under FIFA eligibility rules; some limited exceptions apply. Players may hold more than one non-FIFA nationality.

No.	Pos.	Nation	Player
—	GK	(Netherlands) NED	Dirk Havenaar (from (Japan) Toyota GK coach)
—	GK	(Japan) JPN	Ken Ishikawa (from (Japan) Okinawa International University)
—	GK	(Japan) JPN	Yūji Itō (from (Japan) Yanmar Diesel)
—	DF	(Brazil) BRA	Garça (from (Brazil) Grêmio Maringá)
—	DF	(Japan) JPN	Kazuhisa Iijima (from (Japan) Tokai University)
—	DF	(Japan) JPN	Toshiyuki Kosugi (from (Japan) Doshisha University)
—	DF	(Japan) JPN	Otohiko Kiyono (from (Japan) Teikyo Senior High School)
—	DF	(Japan) JPN	Seiji Kubo (from (Japan) Koga First High School)
—	MF	(Japan) JPN	Tarō Gotō (from (Japan) Tokai University)
—	MF	(Japan) JPN	Tetsuo Nakanishi (from (Japan) Doshisha University)
—	MF	(Brazil) BRA	Pedro (from (Brazil) XV de Jaú)
—	FW	(Japan) JPN	Kazutoshi Ishiyama (from (Japan) Hanasaki Tokuharu High School)
—	FW	(Japan) JPN	Minehide Kimura (from (Japan) Osaka Sangyo University Senior High School)
—	FW	(Japan) JPN	Kimihiko Kiyono (from (Japan) Teikyo Senior High School)
—	FW	(Brazil) BRA	Marcio (from (Brazil) Araçatuba)
—	FW	(Japan) JPN	Yasuyuki Moriyama (from (Japan) Juntendo University)
—	FW	(Japan) JPN	Takafumi Ogura (from (Japan) Yokkaichi Chuo Technical High School)
—	FW	(Japan) JPN	Tetsuya Okayama (from (Japan) Chukyo Senior High School)
—	FW	(Japan) JPN	Kazuhito Yamamoto (from (Japan) Mito Commercial High School)

Out: Note: Flags indicate national team as defined under FIFA eligibility rules; some limited exceptions apply. Players may hold more than one non-FIFA nationality.

No.	Pos.	Nation	Player
—	GK	(Japan) JPN	Tomoaki Sano (to (Japan) NKK), during the season

== Results ==
=== Emperor's Cup ===
5 December 1992 1st Round	Nagoya Grampus Eight	1–3	Fujita	Toyota Athletic Stadium
: JST (UTC+09:00)	Moriyama 7'		T. Iwamoto 44'; Wagner 83'; Noguchi 88'	Attendance: 8,000

=== J.League Cup ===
==== Group stage ====
Team	Pts	W	L	GF	GA	GD
Verdy Kawasaki	29	6	3	18	11	7
Shimizu S-Pulse	27	5	4	16	12	4
Nagoya Grampus	27	6	3	14	10	4
Kashima Antlers	25	4	5	25	20	5
Urawa Reds	25	5	4	15	16	-1
JEF Ichihara	22	5	4	8	7	1
Yokohama Marinos	22	5	4	14	14	0
Gamba Osaka	21	4	5	13	18	-5
Sanfrecce Hiroshima	18	3	6	15	18	-3
Yokohama Flügels	10	2	7	10	22	-12

5 September 1992 1	Nagoya Grampus Eight	3–0	Shimizu S-Pulse	Nagoya Mizuho Football Stadium
15:30 JST (UTC+09:00)	Jorginho 54'; T.Ogura 65'; Asano 70', (yellow card) 82'; Garça (yellow card) 83'; Tsuruta (yellow card) 89'	J. League	Mirandinha (yellow card) 43'; Miura (yellow card) 58'; Antônio (yellow card) 67'	Attendance: 8,029; Referee: Kōetsu Kikuchi; Assistant referees: Tatsumi Ōno; Naoyuki Mori; Fourth official: Takayoshi Kashino

9 September 1992 2	Nagoya Grampus Eight	2–1 (gg) (a.e.t.)	Yokohama Flügels	Nagoya Mizuho Football Stadium
19:00 JST (UTC+09:00)	T.Ogura 25'; Gotō 94'	J. League	Jermaniš (yellow card) 17'; Ishizue (yellow card) 44'; Gliha 51'	Attendance: 5,165; Referee: Fumikazu Shioyazono; Assistant referees: Keiichi Sunakawa; Naoyuki Mori; Fourth official: Takayoshi Kashino

12 September 1992 3	Yokohama Marinos	1–0	Nagoya Grampus Eight	Hiratsuka Stadium
18:00 JST (UTC+09:00)	Noda (yellow card) 5'; Everton 22'	J. League		Attendance: 7,047; Referee: Hitoshi Yamada; Assistant referees: Hiroshi Fukuda; Masato Nogami; Fourth official: Katsunori Moriya

18 September 1992 4	JEF United Ichihara	0–1	Nagoya Grampus Eight	Hiratsuka Stadium
19:01 JST (UTC+09:00)	Sandro (yellow card) 88'	J. League	Shimamura (yellow card) 38', (goal) 66'	Attendance: 4,049; Referee: Masayoshi Okada; Assistant referees: Tetsuya Hamana; Hiroshi Fukuda; Fourth official: Hiromitsu Hirayama

23 September 1992 5	Nagoya Grampus Eight	3–0	Sanfrecce Hiroshima	Nagoya Mizuho Football Stadium
15:00 JST (UTC+09:00)	Sawairi 1', 44'; Garça (yellow card) 9'; T.Ogura 79'; Jorginho (yellow card) 89'	J. League		Attendance: 12,070; Referee: Morihisa Yamaguchi; Assistant referees: Yōzō Tanaka; Naoyuki Mori; Fourth official: Noriaki Fukunaga

26 September 1992 6	Gamba Osaka	0–3	Nagoya Grampus Eight	Kyoto Nishikyogoku Stadium
18:00 JST (UTC+09:00)	Wada (yellow card) 39'; Müller (yellow card) 44'; Asano (yellow card) 50'; Morikawa (yellow card) 76'	J. League	Shimamura 37'; T.Ogura 60', 89'; Garça (yellow card) 66'	Attendance: 14,341; Referee: Shinichirō Obata; Assistant referees: Mitsuyoshi Nakaguma; Yasuhiro Hemmi; Fourth official: Morihisa Yamaguchi

3 October 1992 7	Nagoya Grampus Eight	1–7	Kashima Antlers	Nagoya Mizuho Football Stadium
15:00 JST (UTC+09:00)	Fujikawa (yellow card) 58'; Shimamura 69'	J. League	Kurosaki 10', 73'; Ono (yellow card) 13'; Santos 49'; Hasegawa 68', 82', 89'; Zico 72'	Attendance: 11,728; Referee: Kenji Tanaka; Assistant referees: Morihisa Yamaguchi; Yasushi Tsuchimoto; Fourth official: Takao Wakahara

7 October 1992 8	Urawa Red Diamonds	0–1	Nagoya Grampus Eight	Omiya Football Stadium
19:00 JST (UTC+09:00)	Muramatsu (yellow card) 42'	J. League	37' (o.g.); Egawa (yellow card) 41'; Yonekura (yellow card) 70'	Attendance: 9,696; Referee: Masahiro Sogawa; Assistant referees: Masayoshi Okada; Yū Nakamura; Fourth official: Morihiko Yamaji

11 October 1992 9	Nagoya Grampus Eight	0–1	Verdy Kawasaki	Mie Sports Garden
14:03 JST (UTC+09:00)	Garça (yellow card) 3'	J. League	Miura 16' (pen.)	Attendance: 11,794; Referee: Yū Nakamura; Assistant referees: Yoshio Sawada; Yasushi Tsuchimoto; Fourth official: Mikio Fukuoka

==== Knockout phase ====
16 October 1992 Semifinal	Shimizu S-Pulse	1–0	Nagoya Grampus Eight	Kusanagi Athletic Stadium
19:00 JST (UTC+09:00)	Naitō 9'; Santos (yellow card) 40'; Yamada (yellow card) 63'	J. League	Fujikawa (yellow card) 24'; Egawa (yellow card) 67'; Yonekura (yellow card) 73'	Attendance: 13,391; Referee: Shinichirō Obata; Assistant referees: Morihisa Yamaguchi; Hiroyuki Umemoto; Fourth official: Yoshimi Ogawa

== Squad statistics ==
=== Appearances and goals ===
No.	Pos	Nat	Player	Total		J-League Cup		Emperor's Cup	
No.	Pos	Nat	Player	Apps	Goals	Apps	Goals	Apps	Goals
	GK	(Netherlands) NED	Dirk Havenaar	11	0	10	0	1	0
	DF	(Japan) JPN	Shigemitsu Egawa	4	0	3	0	1	0
	DF	(Brazil) BRA	Garça	9	0	9	0	0	0
	DF	(Japan) JPN	Kazuhisa Iijima	1	0	1	0	0	0
	DF	(Japan) JPN	Toshiyuki Kosugi	7	0	7	0	0	0
	DF	(Japan) JPN	Naoki Mori	1	0	0	0	1	0
	DF	(Japan) JPN	Seiichi Ogawa	11	0	10	0	1	0
	MF	(Japan) JPN	Tetsuya Asano	2	1	2	1	0	0
	MF	(Japan) JPN	Hisataka Fujikawa	10	0	10	0	0	0
	MF	(Brazil) BRA	Jorginho	9	1	8	1	1	0
	FW	(Japan) JPN	Yasuyuki Moriyama	5	1	4	0	1	1
	MF	(Japan) JPN	Tetsuo Nakanishi	11	0	10	0	1	0
	MF	(Japan) JPN	Masashi Shimamura	9	3	8	3	1	0
	MF	(Japan) JPN	Tarō Gotō	7	1	7	1	0	0
	MF	(Japan) JPN	Michihiro Tsuruta	3	0	3	0	0	0
	MF	(Japan) JPN	Makoto Yonekura	11	0	10	0	1	0
	FW	(Japan) JPN	Kimihiko Kiyono	5	0	4	0	1	0
	FW	(Japan) JPN	Takafumi Ogura	10	5	10	5	0	0
	FW	(Japan) JPN	Yūji Sugano	11	2	10	2	1	0
Players who left Nagoya Grampus Eight during the season:

=== Top scorers ===
Place	Position	Nation	Name	J-League Cup	Emperor's Cup	Total
1	FW	(Japan)	Takafumi Ogura	5	0	5
2	MF	(Japan)	Masashi Shimamura	3	0	3
3	FW	(Japan)	Shigeo Sawairi	2	0	2
4	MF	(Brazil)	Jorginho	1	0	1
4	MF	(Japan)	Tetsuya Asano	1	0	1
4	MF	(Japan)	Tarō Gotō	1	0	1
4	FW	(Japan)	Yasuyuki Moriyama	0	1	1
4			Own goal	1	0	1
			TOTALS	14	1	15

=== Disciplinary record ===
Position	Nation	Name	J-League Cup		Emperor's Cup		Total	
Position	Nation	Name	Booked	Sent off (straight red)	Booked	Sent off (straight red)	Booked	Sent off (straight red)
DF	(Brazil)	Garça	4	0	0	0	4	0
MF	(Brazil)	Jorginho	1	0	0	0	1	0
MF	(Japan)	Shigemitsu Egawa	2	0	0	0	2	0
MF	(Japan)	Hisataka Fujikawa	2	0	0	0	2	0
MF	(Japan)	Tetsuya Asano	1	0	0	0	1	0
MF	(Japan)	Masashi Shimamura	0	0	0	0	0	0
MF	(Japan)	Michihiro Tsuruta	1	0	0	0	1	0
MF	(Japan)	Makoto Yonekura	2	0	0	0	2	0
		TOTALS	14	0	0	0	14	0

== Other pages ==
- (in Japanese) J. League official site
- (in Japanese) Nagoya Grampus official site
