= Michihiro Tsuruta =

Japanese footballer

Michihiro Tsuruta 鶴田 道弘
Personal information
- Full name: Michihiro Tsuruta
- Date of birth: January 4, 1968 (age 58)
- Place of birth: Aichi, Japan
- Height: 1.71 m (5 ft 7 1/2 in)
- Position: Midfielder

Youth career
- 1983–1985: Chukyo University Chukyo High School
- 1986–1989: Osaka University of Health and Sport Sciences

Senior career*
Years	Team	Apps	(Gls)
1990–1994	Nagoya Grampus Eight	51	(2)
1995–1996	Vissel Kobe	26	(2)
2000	Ventforet Kofu	4	(0)
Total		81	(4)
- * Club domestic league appearances and goals

Michihiro Tsuruta (鶴田 道弘, Tsuruta Michihiro; born January 4, 1968) is a former Japanese football player.

== Playing career ==
Tsuruta was born in Aichi Prefecture on January 4, 1968. After graduating from Osaka University of Health and Sport Sciences, he joined his local club Toyota Motors (later Nagoya Grampus Eight) in 1990. He played many matches as midfielder from first season. However he could hardly play in the match in 1994 and he moved to Japan Football League club Vissel Kobe in 1995. However his opportunity to play decreased in 1996 and he retired end of 1996 season. In July 2000, he returned as a player at Ventforet Kofu and played for the club until end of season.

== Coaching career ==
After retirement, Tsuruta started coaching career at Nagoya Grampus Eight in 1997. He mainly coached for youth team until 1999. In 2000, he moved to Ventforet Kofu and became a physical coach. He resigned end of 2000 season.

== Club statistics ==
Club performance			League		Cup		League Cup		Total	
Season	Club	League	Apps	Goals	Apps	Goals	Apps	Goals	Apps	Goals
Japan			League		Emperor's Cup		J.League Cup		Total	
1990/91	Toyota Motors	JSL Division 1	8	0			2	0	10	0
1991/92	Toyota Motors	JSL Division 1	13	0			0	0	13	0
1992	Nagoya Grampus Eight	J1 League	-				3	0	3	0
1993	Nagoya Grampus Eight	J1 League	24	2	0	0	4	0	28	2
1994	Nagoya Grampus Eight	J1 League	6	0	0	0	0	0	6	0
1995	Vissel Kobe	Football League	21	2	0	0	-		21	2
1996	Vissel Kobe	Football League	5	0	2	0	-		7	0
2000	Ventforet Kofu	J2 League	4	0	0	0	0	0	4	0
Total			81	4	2	0	9	0	92	4
