= Pita (footballer) =

Brazilian footballer

Personal information
- Full name: Edvaldo Oliveira Chaves
- Date of birth: 4 August 1958 (age 68)
- Place of birth: Rio de Janeiro, Brazil
- Height: 1.72 m (5 ft 8 in)
- Position: Midfielder

Senior career*
Years	Team	Apps	(Gls)
1977–1984	Santos		
1985–1988	São Paulo		
1988–1989	Strasbourg		
1989–1990	Guarani		
1991–1992	Fujita Industries		
1993	Nagoya Grampus Eight		
1994	Inter de Limeira		

International career
1980–1987	Brazil	7	(0)

Managerial career
- 1999: São Paulo U20
- 2000: Santos
- 2001: Urawa Red Diamonds
Medal record
Men's football
Representing Brazil
Pan American Games
Gold medal – first place	1987 Indianapolis	Team competition
- * Club domestic league appearances and goals

Edvaldo Oliveira Chaves (born 4 August 1958 in Nilópolis, Rio de Janeiro State, Brazil), best known as Pita, is a former association footballer in offensive midfielder role, currently works as General Manager by Desportivo Brasil.

== Career ==
In career he played for clubs Santos FC (1978–1984), São Paulo (1985–1988), RC Strasbourg in France (1988–1989), Guarani (1989–1990), in Japan Japan Soccer League, Japan Football League and J1 League with Fujita Industries and Nagoya Grampus Eight (1990–1993), and closed career with Inter Limeira in 1994.

== Titles ==
He won three São Paulo State League (1978, 1985, 1987), and one Brazilian League (1986). For Brazil national football team he got 7 international caps from 1980 and won the 1987 Pan American Games. As manager, he also won the Copa São Paulo de Futebol Júnior for São Paulo in 2000.

== Club statistics ==
Club performance			League	
Season	Club	League	Apps	Goals
Brazil			League	
1977	Santos	Série A	3	1
1978	Santos	Série A	13	3
1979	Santos		0	0
1980	Santos	Série A	18	1
1981	Santos	Série A	4	1
1982	Santos	Série A	15	3
1983	Santos	Série A	24	4
1984	Santos	Série A	17	3
1985	São Paulo	Série A	20	4
1986	São Paulo	Série A	30	5
1987	São Paulo	Série A	14	2
1988	São Paulo	Série A	0	0
France			League	
1988/89	Strasbourg	Division 1	20	6
Brazil			League	
1989	Guarani	Série A	15	0
1990	Guarani	Série B	0	0
Japan			League	
1991/92	Fujita Industries	JSL Division 2	27	12
1992	Fujita Industries	Football League	15	4
1993	Nagoya Grampus Eight	J1 League	8	2
Country	Brazil		173	27
Country	France		20	6
Country	Japan		50	16
Total			243	49

== National team statistics ==
Brazil national team
Year	Apps	Goals
1980	2	0
1981	1	0
1982	0	0
1983	2	0
1984	0	0
1985	0	0
1986	0	0
1987	2	0
Total	7	0

== Managerial statistics ==
Team	From	To	Record				
Team	From	To	G	W	D	L	Win %
São Paulo	1999	1999	2	1	1	0	50.00
Urawa Reds	2001	2001	12	3	3	6	25.00
Total			14	4	4	6	28.57
