= Norifumi =

Norifumi is a masculine Japanese given name. Notable people with the name include:

- Norifumi Abe (阿部 典史, 1975–2007), Japanese motorcycle road racer, previously a 500 cc/MotoGP rider
- Norifumi Nishimura (西村 徳文, born 1960), former Nippon Professional Baseball player and current manager
- Norifumi Shima (島 紀史, born 1970), lead guitar in Concerto Moon, a Japanese neo-classical/power metal band
- Norifumi Suzuki (鈴木 則文, 1933–2014), Japanese film director and screenwriter
- Norifumi Takamoto (高本 詞史, born 1967), former Japanese football player
- Norifumi Yamamoto (山本 徳郁, 1977–2018), Japanese mixed martial artist and kickboxer known as Kid Yamamoto
- Norifumi Yamashita (山下 訓史, born 1962), retired Japanese triple jumper
