= 1994 Nagoya Grampus Eight season =

Nagoya Grampus Eight
1994 season
- Manager: Gordon Milne; Tetsurō Miura (acting manager, October 1994)
- Stadium: Nagoya Mizuho Athletics Stadium
- J.League: 11th
- Emperor's Cup: 2nd Round
- J.League Cup: 1st Round
- Top goalscorer: League: Yasuyuki Moriyama (13); All: Yasuyuki Moriyama (14)
- Highest home attendance: 21,753 (vs Kashima Antlers, 3 September 1994); 50,375 (vs Gamba Osaka, 17 August 1994, Tokyo National Stadium)
- Lowest home attendance: 19,137 (vs Júbilo Iwata, 21 September 1994); 11,488 (vs Bellmare Hiratsuka, 14 May 1994, Nagoya Mizuho Football Stadium)
- Average home league attendance: 21,842
Home colours	Away colours

1994 Nagoya Grampus Eight season

== Review and events ==
=== League results summary ===
Overall								Home						Away					
Pld	W	D	L	GF	GA	GD	Pts	W	D	L	GF	GA	GD	W	D	L	GF	GA	GD
44	15	0	29	56	82	−26	45	11	0	11	34	38	−4	4	0	18	22	44	−22

Source: J.LEAGUE OFFICIAL 1995 RECORD & DATA. ISBN 4-09-102317-7.

=== League results by round ===
J.League Suntory series (first stage)
Round	1	2	3	4	5	6	7	8	9	10	11	12	13	14	15	16	17	18	19	20	21	22
Ground	A	A	H	A	H	A	H	H	A	A	H	H	A	H	A	H	A	A	H	H	A	H
Result	L	L	L	L	W	L	W	W	L	L	L	W	L	L	W	W	L	L	W	L	W	W
Position	9	10	12	12	10	11	8	7	8	9	9	7	10	11	10	8	9	10	8	9	9	8

Source: J.LEAGUE OFFICIAL 1995 RECORD & DATA. ISBN 4-09-102317-7.
A = Away; H = Home; W = Win; D = Draw; L = Loss

J.League NICOS series (second stage)
Round	1	2	3	4	5	6	7	8	9	10	11	12	13	14	15	16	17	18	19	20	21	22
Ground	A	A	H	A	H	A	H	H	A	A	H	H	A	H	A	H	A	A	H	H	A	H
Result	L	W	L	W	W	L	L	L	L	L	W	W	L	L	L	L	L	L	L	L	L	W
Position	12	8	9	7	5	6	9	10	11	11	10	9	9	10	12	12	12	12	12	12	12	12

Source: J.LEAGUE OFFICIAL 1995 RECORD & DATA. ISBN 4-09-102317-7.
A = Away; H = Home; W = Win; D = Draw; L = Loss

== Competitions ==
Competitions	Position
J.League	11th / 12 clubs
Emperor's Cup	2nd round
J.League Cup	1st round

== Domestic results ==
=== J.League ===
==== Suntory series ====
12 March 1994 1st-1	Sanfrecce Hiroshima	2–0	Nagoya Grampus Eight	Hiroshima Big Arch
14:33 JST (UTC+09)	Noh 87'; Takagi 89'	J. League		Attendance: 11,503; Referee: Yoshimi Ogawa; Assistant referees: Yoshikazu Hiroshima, Hiroshi Tanabe; Fourth official: Shinya Sasamoto

16 March 1994 1st-2	Júbilo Iwata	1–0	Nagoya Grampus Eight	Júbilo Iwata Stadium
19:01 JST (UTC+09)	Ōishi 80'	J. League		Attendance: 13,529; Referee: Fumikazu Shioyazono; Assistant referees: Yasushi Tsuchimoto, Tetsu Karakida; Fourth official: Tōru Nagata

19 March 1994 1st-3	Nagoya Grampus Eight	0–2	Gamba Osaka	Nagoya Mizuho Football Stadium
15:02 JST (UTC+09)		J. League	Protassov 45'; Mita 62'	Attendance: 11,519; Referee: Bengt Borjesson; Assistant referees: Yoshitsugu Katayama, Yasuhiro Matsuzaki; Fourth official: Takao Wakahara

23 March 1994 1st-4	Yokohama Flügels	1–0	Nagoya Grampus Eight	Yokohama Mitsuzawa Football Stadium
19:03 JST (UTC+09)	Edu 59'	J. League		Attendance: 10,624; Referee: Kiichirō Tachi; Assistant referees: Kazuaki Hamaguchi, Masato Nogami; Fourth official: Kanichi Takahashi

26 March 1994 1st-5	Nagoya Grampus Eight	7–2	Urawa Red Diamonds	Nagoya Mizuho Football Stadium
15:03 JST (UTC+09)	Fujikawa 16'; Moriyama 39', 43'; Jorginho 64' (pen.), 79'; Elivélton 73', 78'	J. League	4' (o.g.); Okano 70'	Attendance: 11,488; Referee: Masayoshi Okada; Assistant referees: Yasushi Tsuchimoto, Kazuya Yanagisawa; Fourth official: Yūji Kōda; Man of the Match: Yasuyuki Moriyama

2 April 1994 1st-6	Bellmare Hiratsuka	2–0	Nagoya Grampus Eight	Tokyo National Stadium
15:02 JST (UTC+09)	Betinho 54' (pen.); Noguchi 88'	J. League		Attendance: 48,640; Referee: Bengt Borjesson; Assistant referees: Kiyoshi Ōta, Hiroshi Fukuda; Fourth official: Katsunori Moriya

6 April 1994 1st-7	Nagoya Grampus Eight	2–1 (V-goal) (a.e.t.)	Kashima Antlers	Nagoya Mizuho Football Stadium
18:59 JST (UTC+09)	Elivélton 54'; Hirano 105'	J. League	Akita 81'	Attendance: 11,981; Referee: Shinichirō Obata; Assistant referees: Morihisa Yamaguchi, Yasushi Tsuchimoto; Fourth official: Hisao Sugata; Man of the Match: Dido

9 April 1994 1st-8	Nagoya Grampus Eight	1–0	Verdy Kawasaki	Nagoya Mizuho Football Stadium
15:01 JST (UTC+09)	Yonekura 61'	J. League		Attendance: 12,214; Referee: Kiichirō Tachi; Assistant referees: Yasuhiro Hemmi, Toyohide Kanda; Fourth official: Naoto Kuwahara; Man of the Match: Makoto Yonekura

13 April 1994 1st-9	Yokohama Marinos	3–2	Nagoya Grampus Eight	Yokohama Mitsuzawa Football Stadium
19:02 JST (UTC+09)	Díaz 13', 26', 86'	J. League	Moriyama 24'; Hirano 81'	Attendance: 13,142; Referee: Tatsumi Ōno; Assistant referees: Noboru Ishiyama, Tetsu Karakida; Fourth official: Hideaki Kobayashi

16 April 1994 1st-10	Shimizu S-Pulse	2–1	Nagoya Grampus Eight	Nihondaira Sports Stadium
15:04 JST (UTC+09)	Horiike 46'; Toninho 55'	J. League	Jorginho 74'	Attendance: 9,652; Referee: Yoshimi Ogawa; Assistant referees: Yoshikazu Hiroshima, Kazuya Yanagisawa; Fourth official: Masakazu Hōjō

23 April 1994 1st-11	Nagoya Grampus Eight	0–1	JEF United Ichihara	Nagoya Mizuho Football Stadium
15:03 JST (UTC+09)		J. League	Kizawa 22'	Attendance: 11,716; Referee: Kōetsu Kikuchi; Assistant referees: Keiichi Sunakawa, Mikio Fukuoka; Fourth official: Noriaki Fukunaga

27 April 1994 1st-12	Nagoya Grampus Eight	1–0	Júbilo Iwata	Tokyo National Stadium
19:00 JST (UTC+09)	Gotō 4'	J. League		Attendance: 49,028; Referee: Shizuo Takada; Assistant referees: Kazuaki Hamaguchi, Hiroshi Fukuda; Fourth official: Keizō Yamazaki; Man of the Match: Tarō Gotō

30 April 1994 1st-13	Gamba Osaka	3–0	Nagoya Grampus Eight	Kobe Universiade Memorial Stadium
15:03 JST (UTC+09)	Protassov 36', 38'; Isogai 59'	J. League		Attendance: 36,280; Referee: Kenji Tanaka; Assistant referees: Yoshikazu Hiroshima, Sōichirō Kaneko; Fourth official: Kazuya Yanagisawa

4 May 1994 1st-14	Nagoya Grampus Eight	0–2	Yokohama Flügels	Tecnoport Fukui Stadium
14:02 JST (UTC+09)		J. League	Maezono 62'; Watanabe 87'	Attendance: 15,206; Referee: Hideo Kikuchi; Assistant referees: Kimio Izaki, Yasushi Tsuchimoto; Fourth official: Masao Nakajō

7 May 1994 1st-15	Urawa Red Diamonds	0–1	Nagoya Grampus Eight	Tokyo National Stadium
18:30 JST (UTC+09)		J. League	Elivélton 61'	Attendance: 52,440; Referee: Yōtarō Moritsu; Assistant referees: Hitoshi Yamada, Mitsuru Satō; Fourth official: Keiji Kamiara; Man of the Match: Elivélton

14 May 1994 1st-16	Nagoya Grampus Eight	2–1	Bellmare Hiratsuka	Nagoya Mizuho Football Stadium
19:02 JST (UTC+09)	Elivélton 17'; Moriyama 80'	J. League	Noguchi 76'	Attendance: 11,488; Referee: Shinichirō Obata; Assistant referees: Hiroshi Fukuda, Mikio Fukuoka; Fourth official: Toshiya Narita; Man of the Match: Yūji Itō

18 May 1994 1st-17	Kashima Antlers	2–1	Nagoya Grampus Eight	Kashima Soccer Stadium
19:03 JST (UTC+09)	Santos 73'; Alcindo 77'	J. League	Moriyama 14'	Attendance: 15,578; Referee: Masayoshi Okada; Assistant referees: Yū Nakamura, Satoru Ishizawa; Fourth official: Ichirō Inukai

1 June 1994 1st-18	Verdy Kawasaki	2–1	Nagoya Grampus Eight	Kawasaki Todoroki Stadium
19:04 JST (UTC+09)	Hashiratani 55'; Takeda 69'	J. League	Moriyama 78'	Attendance: 10,591; Referee: Masayoshi Okada; Assistant referees: Noboru Ishiyama, Masahiro Katagiri; Fourth official: Tetsuo Yamaki

4 June 1994 1st-19	Nagoya Grampus Eight	2–0	Yokohama Marinos	Nagoya Mizuho Football Stadium
14:01 JST (UTC+09)	Hirano 10'; 26' (o.g.)	J. League		Attendance: 12,190; Referee: Fumikazu Shioyazono; Assistant referees: Yasushi Tsuchimoto, Naoyuki Mori; Fourth official: Tsutomu Suda; Man of the Match: Garça

8 June 1994 1st-20	Nagoya Grampus Eight	0–1 (V-goal) (a.e.t.)	Shimizu S-Pulse	Kobe Universiade Memorial Stadium
19:03 JST (UTC+09)		J. League	Toninho 113'	Attendance: 38,239; Referee: Shinichirō Obata; Assistant referees: Morihisa Yamaguchi, Toyohide Kanda; Fourth official: Yasuhiro Hemmi

11 June 1994 1st-21	JEF United Ichihara	0–1	Nagoya Grampus Eight	Ichihara Stadium
18:31 JST (UTC+09)		J. League	Jorginho 64'	Attendance: 10,516; Referee: Zoran Petrović; Assistant referees: Takashi Kunori, Kimio Izaki; Fourth official: Tatsuya Sakata; Man of the Match: Yūji Itō

15 June 1994 1st-22	Nagoya Grampus Eight	1–0	Sanfrecce Hiroshima	Nagoya Minato Stadium
19:03 JST (UTC+09)	Moriyama 66'	J. League		Attendance: 16,547; Referee: Kenji Tanaka; Assistant referees: Yasushi Tsuchimoto, Naoyuki Mori; Fourth official: Akihiko Kakei; Man of the Match: Kazuhisa Iijima

==== NICOS series ====
10 August 1994 2nd-1	Sanfrecce Hiroshima	4–0	Nagoya Grampus Eight	Hiroshima Stadium
19:03 JST (UTC+09)	Černý 6'; 7' (o.g.); Hašek 34', 66'	J. League		Attendance: 11,796; Referee: Shinichirō Obata; Assistant referees: Morihisa Yamaguchi, Hideaki Harada; Fourth official: Kōji Ueno

13 August 1994 2nd-2	Júbilo Iwata	2–3 (V-goal) (a.e.t.)	Nagoya Grampus Eight	Júbilo Iwata Stadium
19:02 JST (UTC+09)	M. Suzuki 84'; Schillaci 87'	J. League	Lineker 52' (pen.); Jorginho 72'; Ogura 116'	Attendance: 14,592; Referee: Kōetsu Kikuchi; Assistant referees: Tetsu Karakida, Kōji Taniuchi; Fourth official: Tōru Nagata; Man of the Match: Takafumi Ogura

17 August 1994 2nd-3	Nagoya Grampus Eight	2–3 (V-goal) (a.e.t.)	Gamba Osaka	Tokyo National Stadium
19:00 JST (UTC+09)	Kosugi 83'; Hirano 89'	J. League	Yamaguchi 33'; Protassov 52'; Flavio 104'	Attendance: 50,375; Referee: Shizuo Takada; Assistant referees: Noboru Ishiyama, Hiroshi Fukuda; Fourth official: Takeyoshi Takahashi

20 August 1994 2nd-4	Yokohama Flügels	1–2 (V-goal) (a.e.t.)	Nagoya Grampus Eight	Yokohama Mitsuzawa Football Stadium
19:02 JST (UTC+09)	Maeda 68'	J. League	Nakanishi 58'; Jorginho 96'	Attendance: 13,319; Referee: Tetsuya Hamana; Assistant referees: Hitoshi Yamada, Mitsuo Kadota; Fourth official: Kenji Ōgiya; Man of the Match: Jorginho

27 August 1994 2nd-5	Nagoya Grampus Eight	4–2	Urawa Red Diamonds	Gifu Nagaragawa Stadium
18:01 JST (UTC+09)	Moriyama 0', 84'; Binić 49', 69'	J. League	Lulu 15'; Y. Satō 74'	Attendance: 25,096; Referee: Zoran Petrović; Assistant referees: Yasuhiro Matsuzaki, Naoyuki Mori; Fourth official: Yasushi Tsuchimoto; Man of the Match: Binić

31 August 1994 2nd-6	Bellmare Hiratsuka	2–0	Nagoya Grampus Eight	Hiratsuka Stadium
19:03 JST (UTC+09)	Betinho 23' (pen.); Almir 84'	J. League		Attendance: 15,486; Referee: Kiyoshi Ōta; Assistant referees: Keiichi Sunakawa, Mitsuru Satō; Fourth official: Junichi Takahashi

3 September 1994 2nd-7	Nagoya Grampus Eight	2–4	Kashima Antlers	Nagoya Mizuho Athletics Stadium
18:30 JST (UTC+09)	Lineker 24'; Jorginho 81'	J. League	Hasegawa 32'; Leonardo 59'; Masuda 66'; Alcindo 68'	Attendance: 21,753; Referee: Tetsuya Hamana; Assistant referees: Naoyuki Mori, Mikio Fukuoka; Fourth official: Tsuyoshi Ogura

7 September 1994 2nd-8	Nagoya Grampus Eight	1–2	Verdy Kawasaki	Nagoya Mizuho Athletics Stadium
19:05 JST (UTC+09)	Lineker 45'	J. League	Takeda 36'; Bismarck 63'	Attendance: 21,316; Referee: Kōetsu Kikuchi; Assistant referees: Masahiro Katagiri, Mitsuo Kadota; Fourth official: Toshiya Narita

10 September 1994 2nd-9	Yokohama Marinos	2–1	Nagoya Grampus Eight	Yokohama Mitsuzawa Football Stadium
19:02 JST (UTC+09)	Bisconti 48' (pen.); Díaz 87'	J. League	Moriyama 89'	Attendance: 13,652; Referee: Kiichirō Tachi; Assistant referees: Hiroshi Fukuda, Kazuaki Hamaguchi; Fourth official: Junichi Sasaki

14 September 1994 2nd-10	Shimizu S-Pulse	2–1	Nagoya Grampus Eight	Hakatanomori Athletic Stadium
19:01 JST (UTC+09)	Toninho 2'; Ronaldo 9'	J. League	Mori 5'	Attendance: 20,077; Referee: Zoran Petrović; Assistant referees: Hiroshi Tanabe, Tōru Yamashiro; Fourth official: Hiroyuki Izumi

17 September 1994 2nd-11	Nagoya Grampus Eight	3–1	JEF United Ichihara	Gifu Nagaragawa Stadium
18:00 JST (UTC+09)	Binić 57', 68'; Stojković 74'	J. League	Ordenewitz 67'	Attendance: 24,157; Referee: Yōtarō Moritsu; Assistant referees: Kazuya Yanagisawa, Sōichirō Kaneko; Fourth official: Yasushi Tsuchimoto; Man of the Match: Stojković

21 September 1994 2nd-12	Nagoya Grampus Eight	4–1	Júbilo Iwata	Nagoya Mizuho Athletics Stadium
19:03 JST (UTC+09)	Binić 3'; Ogura 6'; Stojković 44' (pen.), 89' (pen.)	J. League	Yonezawa 46'	Attendance: 19,137; Referee: Hiroyuki Umemoto; Assistant referees: Morihisa Yamaguchi, Tetsu Karakida; Fourth official: Kazuo Koyake; Man of the Match: Yūji Itō

19 October 1994 2nd-13	Gamba Osaka	5–3	Nagoya Grampus Eight	Expo '70 Commemorative Stadium
19:03 JST (UTC+09)	Karashima 59'; Aleinikov 67'; Yamaguchi 77', 79'; Protassov 85'	J. League	Garça 11'; Jorginho 51'; Ogura 61'	Attendance: 17,330; Referee: Shinichirō Obata; Assistant referees: Kazuya Yanagisawa, Kazunori Ōtoshi; Fourth official: Akira Okada

22 October 1994 2nd-14	Nagoya Grampus Eight	0–3	Yokohama Flügels	Gifu Nagaragawa Stadium
18:34 JST (UTC+09)		J. League	Válber 11', 65'; Edu 44' (pen.)	Attendance: 24,817; Referee: Yoshimi Ogawa; Assistant referees: Kazuaki Hamaguchi, Satoru Ishizawa; Fourth official: Takahiko Sugiyama

26 October 1994 2nd-15	Urawa Red Diamonds	1–1 (V-goal) (a.e.t.) (4–3 p)	Nagoya Grampus Eight	Omiya Football Stadium
19:04 JST (UTC+09)	Nakashima 27'	J. League	Yonekura 83'	Attendance: 9,885; Referee: Alberto Tejada; Assistant referees: Kazuaki Hamaguchi, Kazuhisa Osada; Fourth official: Ichirō Kuwabara
	Penalties
	(penalty missed) Fukuda; (penalty scored) Lulu; (penalty scored) S. Kikuhara; (penalty scored) Buchwald; (penalty scored) Asano		(penalty scored) Ogura; (penalty missed) Hirano; (penalty scored) Lineker; (penalty scored) Egawa; (penalty missed) Garça

29 October 1994 2nd-16	Nagoya Grampus Eight	0–4	Bellmare Hiratsuka	Gifu Nagaragawa Stadium
14:33 JST (UTC+09)		J. League	Betinho 50' (pen.); Nishiyama 51'; Noguchi 64'; Almir 79'	Attendance: 23,899; Referee: Masahiro Sogawa; Assistant referees: Keiichi Sunakawa, Satoru Ishizawa; Fourth official: Tatsuo Gotō

2 November 1994 2nd-17	Kashima Antlers	3–3 (V-goal) (a.e.t.) (5–4 p)	Nagoya Grampus Eight	Kashima Soccer Stadium
19:03 JST (UTC+09)	Masuda 38', 89'; Hasegawa 53'	J. League	Moriyama 36'; Yonekura 66'; Ogura 86'	Attendance: 15,608; Referee: Keiichi Sunakawa; Assistant referees: Masato Nogami, Yasuhiro Matsuzaki; Fourth official: Ichirō Inukai
	Penalties
	(penalty scored) Alcindo; (penalty scored) Kurosaki; (penalty scored) Hasegawa; (penalty scored) Manaka; (penalty scored) Honda		(penalty scored) Yonekura; (penalty missed) Hirano; (penalty scored) Ogura; (penalty scored) Stojković; (penalty scored) Fujikawa

5 November 1994 2nd-18	Verdy Kawasaki	2–1 (V-goal) (a.e.t.)	Nagoya Grampus Eight	Kawasaki Todoroki Stadium
19:04 JST (UTC+09)	Ramos 77'; Fujiyoshi 93'	J. League	Moriyama 67'	Attendance: 15,547; Referee: Zoran Petrović; Assistant referees: Hiroshi Fukuda, Masahiro Katagiri; Fourth official: Hideaki Ishii

9 November 1994 2nd-19	Nagoya Grampus Eight	1–6	Yokohama Marinos	Gifu Nagaragawa Stadium
18:33 JST (UTC+09)	Ogura 49'	J. League	Zapata 18'; Miura 33', 70', 81'; Díaz 53' (pen.), 68'	Attendance: 23,072; Referee: Kenji Tanaka; Assistant referees: Yasushi Tsuchimoto, Naoyuki Mori; Fourth official: Takahiko Sugiyama

12 November 1994 2nd-20	Nagoya Grampus Eight	0–2	Shimizu S-Pulse	Gifu Nagaragawa Stadium
15:03 JST (UTC+09)		J. League	Hasegawa 22'; Sawanobori 89'	Attendance: 23,774; Referee: Tatsumi Ōno; Assistant referees: Hitoshi Yamada, Mikio Fukuoka; Fourth official: Tatsuo Gotō

16 November 1994 2nd-21	JEF United Ichihara	2–0	Nagoya Grampus Eight	Ichihara Stadium
19:03 JST (UTC+09)	Ordenewitz 70'; Jō 75'	J. League		Attendance: 14,106; Referee: Yoshimi Ogawa; Assistant referees: Takashi Kunori, Satoru Ishizawa; Fourth official: Yoshitoshi Watanabe

19 November 1994 2nd-22	Nagoya Grampus Eight	1–0 (V-goal) (a.e.t.)	Sanfrecce Hiroshima	Nagoya Mizuho Athletics Stadium
15:03 JST (UTC+09)	Moriyama 100'	J. League		Attendance: 21,506; Referee: Yashitsugu Katayama; Assistant referees: Sōichirō Kaneko, Hideaki Harada; Fourth official: Eiji Murakami; Man of the Match: Kazuhisa Iijima

=== Emperor's Cup ===
4 December 1994 1st Round	NEC Yamagata	2–3	Nagoya Grampus Eight	Kōriyama Kaiseizan Athletic Stadium
: JST (UTC+09)	Hirosawa ?', ?'		Moriyama ?'; Stojković ?'; Okayama ?'

11 December 1994 2nd Round	Yokohama Marinos	1–0	Nagoya Grampus Eight	Tochigi Utsunomiya Green Stadium
: JST (UTC+09)	Díaz 79'			Attendance: 18,014

=== J.League Cup ===
27 July 1994 1st Round	Nagoya Grampus Eight	1–3	JEF United Ichihara	Nagoya Mizuho Athletics Stadium
19:03 JST (UTC+09)	Mori 57'	J. League	Jō 5'; Gotō 26'; Niimura 36'	Attendance: 23,765; Referee: Keiichi Sunakawa; Assistant referees: Naoyuki Mori, Mikio Fukuoka; Fourth official: Yūji Kōda

== Player statistics ==
No.	Pos	Nat	Player	Total		J-League		Emperor's Cup		J-League Cup	
No.	Pos	Nat	Player	Apps	Goals	Apps	Goals	Apps	Goals	Apps	Goals
	GK	(Japan) JPN	Dirk Havenaar (Note: His name is Dido Havenaar. But his name is listed with Dirk Havenaar on J.League official books in 1994. He was naturalized in Japan in January 1994.)	27	0	27	0	0	0	0	0
	GK	(Japan) JPN	Yūji Itō	22	0	19	0	2	0	1	0
	GK	(Japan) JPN	Ken Ishikawa	0	0	0	0	0	0	0	0
	GK	(Japan) JPN	Tsuneyoshi Ōsaki	0	0	0	0	0	0	0	0
	GK	(Japan) JPN	Hiroki Mizuhara	0	0	0	0	0	0	0	0
	DF	(Japan) JPN	Hisataka Fujikawa	38	1	37	1	0	0	1	0
	DF	(Japan) JPN	Shigemitsu Egawa	13	0	12	0	0	0	1	0
	DF	(Brazil) BRA	Garça	25	1	23	1	2	0	0	0
	DF	(Japan) JPN	Toshiyuki Kosugi	37	1	36	1	0	0	1	0
	DF	(Japan) JPN	Kazuhisa Iijima	34	0	31	0	2	0	1	0
	DF	(Japan) JPN	Shinji Ishihara	0	0	0	0	0	0	0	0
	DF	(Japan) JPN	Seiichi Ogawa	26	0	24	0	2	0	0	0
	DF	(Japan) JPN	Naoki Mori	31	2	28	1	2	0	1	1
	DF	(Japan) JPN	Otohiko Kiyono	0	0	0	0	0	0	0	0
	DF	(Japan) JPN	Kazuhito Yamamoto	0	0	0	0	0	0	0	0
	DF	(Japan) JPN	Seiji Kubo	1	0	1	0	0	0	0	0
	DF	(Japan) JPN	Kei Taniguchi	4	0	3	0	1	0	0	0
	DF	(Japan) JPN	Mitsutoshi Tsushima	10	0	10	0	0	0	0	0
	MF	(Brazil) BRA	Jorginho	41	8	38	8	2	0	1	0
	MF	(Japan) JPN	Tetsuya Asano	3	0	3	0	0	0	0	0
	MF	(Japan) JPN	Michihiro Tsuruta	6	0	6	0	0	0	0	0
	MF	(Japan) JPN	Nariyasu Yasuhara	1	0	1	0	0	0	0	0
	MF	(Japan) JPN	Tetsuo Nakanishi	37	1	37	1	0	0	0	0
	MF	(Japan) JPN	Makoto Yonekura	26	3	25	3	0	0	1	0
	MF	(Japan) JPN	Masashi Shimamura	0	0	0	0	0	0	0	0
	MF	(Japan) JPN	Hiroyasu Ibata	0	0	0	0	0	0	0	0
	MF	(Japan) JPN	Hideyoshi Akita	1	0	1	0	0	0	0	0
	FW	(England) ENG	Lineker	12	3	11	3	0	0	1	0
	FW	(Japan) JPN	Shigeo Sawairi	11	0	11	0	0	0	0	0
	FW	(Japan) JPN	Akiyoshi Yoshida	0	0	0	0	0	0	0	0
	FW	(Japan) JPN	Yasuyuki Moriyama	42	14	39	13	2	1	1	0
	FW	(Japan) JPN	Tarō Gotō	26	1	24	1	2	0	0	0
	FW	(Brazil) BRA	Elivélton	15	5	15	5	0	0	0	0
	FW	(Japan) JPN	Kazutoshi Ishiyama	0	0	0	0	0	0	0	0
	FW	(Japan) JPN	Tetsuya Okayama	4	1	2	0	2	1	0	0
	FW	(Japan) JPN	Hiroshi Asō	0	0	0	0	0	0	0	0
	FW	(Japan) JPN	Takashi Hirano	39	4	36	4	2	0	1	0
	FW	(Japan) JPN	Takaki Kanda	0	0	0	0	0	0	0	0
	FW	(Japan) JPN	Takafumi Ogura †	26	5	23	5	2	0	1	0
	FW	(Japan) JPN	Hiromasa Yamaguchi †	0	0	0	0	0	0	0	0
	MF	(Federal Republic of Yugoslavia) YUG	Dragiša Binić †	8	5	8	5	0	0	0	0
	MF	(Federal Republic of Yugoslavia) YUG	Stojković †	17	4	14	3	2	1	1	0

- † player(s) joined the team after the opening of this season.

== Transfers ==
In:

No.	Pos.	Nation	Player
—	DF	JPN	Otohiko Kiyono (loan return from Osnabrück)
—	MF	JPN	Hiroyasu Ibata (from Muroran Otani High School)
—	FW	JPN	Takaki Kanda (from Niigata Kogyo High School)

Out:

No.	Pos.	Nation	Player
—	DF	JPN	Norifumi Takamoto (to Kyoto Purple Sanga)
—	DF	JPN	Takayuki Akiyama
—	MF	JPN	Takehiro Iwagiri
—	MF	JPN	Yoshimi Hamasaki
—	FW	JPN	Kimihiko Kiyono
—	FW	JPN	Minehide Kimura

== Transfers during the season ==
=== In ===
- (Japan) Takafumi Ogura (loan return from Excelsior)
- (Japan) Hiromasa Yamaguchi (from Chukyo University)
- (Federal Republic of Yugoslavia) Dragan Stojković (from Olympique de Marseille on July)
- (Federal Republic of Yugoslavia) Dragiša Binić (from APOEL F.C. on July)

=== Out ===
- (Japan) Tetsuya Asano (loan to Urawa Red Diamonds on April)
- (Brazil) Elivélton (on September)

== Awards ==
none

== Other pages ==
- (in Japanese) J. League official site
- (in Japanese) Nagoya Grampus official site
