= Mitsutoshi =

- Gender: Male

Origin
- Word/name: Japanese
- Meaning: Different meanings depending on the kanji used

Mitsutoshi (written: 充寿, 光年 or 三敏) is a masculine Japanese given name. Notable men with it include:

- Mitsutoshi Furuya (古谷 三敏, 1936–2021), manga artist
- Mitsutoshi Shimabukuro (島袋 光年) (born 1975), manga artist
- Mitsutoshi Tsushima (津島 三敏, born 1974), footballer
- Mitsutoshi Watada (和多田 充寿) (born 1976), footballer
