= Shigemitsu Egawa =

Japanese footballer and manager

Shigemitsu Egawa 江川 重光
Personal information
- Full name: Shigemitsu Egawa
- Date of birth: January 31, 1966 (age 60)
- Place of birth: Yokkaichi, Mie, Japan
- Height: 1.72 m (5 ft 7 1/2 in)
- Position: Midfielder

Youth career
- 1981–1983: Yokkaichi Chuo Technical High School

Senior career*
Years	Team	Apps	(Gls)
1984–1991	Honda	104	(11)
1991–1994	Nagoya Grampus Eight	57	(1)
1995–1997	Vissel Kobe	57	(5)
Total		218	(17)

International career
1989	Japan Futsal		

Managerial career
- 2002–2005: Iga FC Kunoichi
- * Club domestic league appearances and goals

Shigemitsu Egawa (江川 重光, Egawa Shigemitsu; born January 31, 1966) is a former Japanese football player and manager.

== Playing career ==
Egawa was born in Yokkaichi on January 31, 1966. After graduating from high school, he joined Honda in 1984. He played as regular player as midfielder. The club won the 3rd place in 1985–86 and 1990–91 Japan Soccer League. In 1991, he moved to Toyota Motors (later Nagoya Grampus Eight). Although he played as regular player, his opportunity to play decreased in 1994. In 1995, he moved to Japan Football League club Vissel Kobe. The club won the 2nd place in 1996 and was promoted to J1 League. He retired end of 1997 season.

== Futsal career ==
In 1989, Egawa selected Japan national futsal team for 1989 Futsal World Championship in Netherlands.

== Coaching career ==
In 2002, Egawa became a manager for L.League club Iga FC Kunoichi based in his local Mie Prefecture. He managed the club until 2005.

== Club statistics ==
Club performance			League		Cup		League Cup		Total	
Season	Club	League	Apps	Goals	Apps	Goals	Apps	Goals	Apps	Goals
Japan			League		Emperor's Cup		J.League Cup		Total	
1984	Honda	JSL Division 1	0	0	0	0	0	0	0	0
1985/86	Honda	JSL Division 1	20	5	2	1	3	1	25	7
1986/87	Honda	JSL Division 1	18	1	2	0	4	0	24	1
1987/88	Honda	JSL Division 1	18	2	1	0	3	0	22	2
1988/89	Honda	JSL Division 1	12	1	1	1	1	0	14	2
1989/90	Honda	JSL Division 1	20	1	2	0	0	0	22	1
1990/91	Honda	JSL Division 1	16	1			4	0	20	1
1991/92	Toyota Motors	JSL Division 1	21	0			2	2	23	2
1992	Nagoya Grampus Eight	J1 League	-		1	0	3	0	4	0
1993	Nagoya Grampus Eight	J1 League	24	1	3	0	5	1	32	2
1994	Nagoya Grampus Eight	J1 League	12	0	0	0	1	0	13	0
1995	Vissel Kobe	Football League	24	3	2	0	-		26	3
1996	Vissel Kobe	Football League	19	1	1	0	-		20	1
1997	Vissel Kobe	J1 League	14	1	2	0	3	1	19	2
Total			218	17	17	2	29	5	264	24
