= Hisataka Fujikawa =

Japanese footballer (born 1964)

Hisataka Fujikawa 藤川 久孝
Personal information
- Full name: Hisataka Fujikawa
- Date of birth: May 1, 1964 (age 62)
- Place of birth: Kanagawa, Japan
- Height: 1.80 m (5 ft 11 in)
- Position: Midfielder

Youth career
- 1980–1982: Narashino High School
- 1983–1986: Hosei University

Senior career*
Years	Team	Apps	(Gls)
1987–1994	Nagoya Grampus Eight		
1995–1996	JEF United Ichihara	26	(1)
- * Club domestic league appearances and goals

Hisataka Fujikawa (藤川 久孝, Fujikawa Hisataka; born May 1, 1964) is a former Japanese football player.

== Playing career ==
Fujikawa was born in Kanagawa Prefecture on May 1, 1964. After graduating from Hosei University, he joined Toyota Motors in 1987. He became a regular player as defensive midfielder and center back. In 1995, he moved to JEF United Ichihara. However his opportunity to play decreased and he retired end of 1996 season.

== Club statistics ==
Club performance			League		Cup		League Cup		Total	
Season	Club	League	Apps	Goals	Apps	Goals	Apps	Goals	Apps	Goals
Japan			League		Emperor's Cup		J.League Cup		Total	
1987/88	Toyota Motors	JSL Division 1	18	0					18	0
1988/89	Toyota Motors	JSL Division 2								
1989/90	Toyota Motors	JSL Division 2	21	2			0	0	21	2
1990/91	Toyota Motors	JSL Division 1	19	0			2	0	21	0
1991/92	Toyota Motors	JSL Division 1	22	0			2	0	24	0
1992	Nagoya Grampus Eight	J1 League	-				10	0	10	0
1993	Nagoya Grampus Eight	J1 League	33	0	3	0	3	0	39	0
1994	Nagoya Grampus Eight	J1 League	37	1	0	0	1	0	38	1
1995	JEF United Ichihara	J1 League	15	1	0	0	-		15	1
1996	JEF United Ichihara	J1 League	11	0	0	0	3	0	14	0
Total			176	4	3	0	21	0	200	4
