= Jorginho Putinatti =

Brazilian footballer

Personal information
- Full name: Jorge Antônio Putinatti
- Date of birth: 23 August 1959 (age 67)
- Place of birth: Marília, Brazil
- Height: 1.72 m (5 ft 8 in)
- Position: Midfielder

Senior career*
Years	Team	Apps	(Gls)
1976–1979	Marília		
1979–1987	Palmeiras	100	(29)
1988	Corinthians	9	(0)
1989	Grêmio	21	(3)
1989	Guarani	0	(0)
1989	Santos	10	(1)
1990	XV de Piracicaba	0	(0)
1990–1994	Nagoya Grampus Eight	107	(30)

International career
1983–1985	Brazil	16	(2)
- * Club domestic league appearances and goals

Jorge Antônio Putinatti, or better known as Jorginho Putinatti (born 23 August 1959 in Marília, Brazil) is a Brazilian former footballer who played as a midfielder.

== Club career ==
At club level, Jorginho started his career with his hometown team Marília in 1976, and went on to play for several other Brazilian clubs, spending most of his career with Palmeiras, and later winning the 1989 Campeonato Gaúcho with Grêmio. He ended his career in 1994, after playing in Japan for four years with Nagoya Grampus Eight.

== International career ==
At international level, Jorginho represented the Brazil national football team on 16 occasions between 1983 and 1985, scoring two goals. He was a member of the side that reached the final of the 1983 Copa América.

== Style of play ==
Jorginho was an offensive–minded midfielder, who usually played as a right winger, although he was also capable of playing in a more central role as an attacking midfielder, or even as a forward.

== Career statistics ==
=== Club ===
Club performance			League		Cup		League Cup		Total	
Season	Club	League	Apps	Goals	Apps	Goals	Apps	Goals	Apps	Goals
Brazil			League		Copa do Brasil		League Cup		Total	
1979	Palmeiras	Série A	5	2					5	2
1980	Palmeiras	Série A	17	5					17	5
1981	Palmeiras	Série A	4	0					4	0
1982	Palmeiras	Série B	0	0					0	0
1983	Palmeiras	Série A	20	5					20	5
1984	Palmeiras	Série A	13	6					13	6
1985	Palmeiras	Série A	18	5					18	5
1986	Palmeiras	Série A	23	2					23	2
1987	Corinthians Paulista	Série A	9	0					9	0
1988	Corinthians Paulista	Série A	0	0					0	0
1988	Grêmio	Série A	21	3					21	3
1989	Guarani	Série A	0	0					0	0
1989	Santos	Série A	10	1					10	1
1990	XV Novembro-Piracicaba	Série B	0	0					0	0
Japan			League		Emperor's Cup		J.League Cup		Total	
1990/91	Toyota Motors	JSL Division 1	22	8			0	0	22	8
1991/92	Toyota Motors	JSL Division 1	20	5			1	0	21	5
1992	Nagoya Grampus Eight	J1 League	-		1	0	8	1	9	1
1993	Nagoya Grampus Eight	J1 League	27	9	3	1	1	0	31	10
1994	Nagoya Grampus Eight	J1 League	38	8	2	0	1	0	41	8
Country	Brazil		140	29					140	29
Country	Japan		107	30	6	1	11	1	124	32
Total			247	59	6	1	11	1	264	61

=== International ===
Brazil national team
Year	Apps	Goals
1983	12	2
1984	0	0
1985	4	0
Total	16	2

== Honours ==
=== Club ===
Marília

- Copa São Paulo de Futebol Júnior: 1979

Grêmio

- Campeonato Gaúcho: 1989

=== International ===
Brazil

- Copa América (runner-up): 1983

=== Individual ===
- Bola de Prata: 1979, 1983, 1986
- Japan Soccer League Team of the Year: 1990–91, 1991–92
