= Shigeo Sawairi =

Japanese footballer and manager

Shigeo Sawairi 澤入 重雄
Personal information
- Full name: Shigeo Sawairi
- Date of birth: May 8, 1963 (age 63)
- Place of birth: Shizuoka, Shizuoka, Japan
- Height: 1.82 m (6 ft 0 in)
- Positions: Midfielder; forward

Youth career
- 1979–1981: Shimizu Higashi High School
- 1982–1985: Hosei University

Senior career*
Years	Team	Apps	(Gls)
1986–1995	Nagoya Grampus Eight		

Managerial career
- 2008: JEF United Chiba (caretaker)
- 2015: Kataller Toyama
Medal record
Nagoya Grampus Eight
Winner	Emperor's Cup	1995
- * Club domestic league appearances and goals

Shigeo Sawairi (澤入 重雄, Sawairi Shigeo; born May 8, 1963) is a former Japanese football player and manager.

== Playing career ==
Sawairi was born in Shizuoka on May 8, 1963. After graduating from Hosei University, he joined Toyota Motors (later Nagoya Grampus Eight) in 1986. He played as an offensive midfielder and as a forward. He also served as captain. However his opportunity to play decreased from 1994 and he retired at the end of the 1995 season.

== Coaching career ==
After retirement, Sawairi started his coaching career at Nagoya Grampus Eight in 1996. He mainly served as scout. From 2000, he coached for university and high school teams until 2008. In May 2008, he signed with JEF United Chiba and he became a coach under new manager Alex Miller. Sawairi managed in 2 matches as caretaker until Miller's registration is completed. However the club performance was bad and he was sacked with Miller in September 2009. From 2010, he managed university teams until 2014. In November 2014, he signed with Kataller Toyama and became a general manager. In August 2015, manager Yasuyuki Kishino was sacked and Sawairi became a new manager. He managed the club until end of 2015 season and left the club end of 2016 season.

== Club statistics ==
Club performance			League		Cup		League Cup		Total	
Season	Club	League	Apps	Goals	Apps	Goals	Apps	Goals	Apps	Goals
Japan			League		Emperor's Cup		J.League Cup		Total	
1986/87	Toyota Motors	JSL Division 2								
1987/88	Toyota Motors	JSL Division 1	21	1			1	0	22	1
1988/89	Toyota Motors	JSL Division 2	28	11			2	3	30	14
1989/90	Toyota Motors	JSL Division 2	29	27			1	1	30	28
1990/91	Toyota Motors	JSL Division 1	22	5			2	0	24	5
1991/92	Toyota Motors	JSL Division 1	19	6			2	2	21	8
1992	Nagoya Grampus Eight	J1 League	-		1	0	10	2	11	2
1993	Nagoya Grampus Eight	J1 League	22	6	0	0	2	0	24	6
1994	Nagoya Grampus Eight	J1 League	11	0	0	0	0	0	11	0
1995	Nagoya Grampus Eight	J1 League	0	0	0	0	-		0	0
Total			152	56	1	0	20	8	173	64

== Managerial statistics ==
Team	From	To	Record				
Team	From	To	G	W	D	L	Win %
JEF United Chiba	2008	2008	2	2	0	0	100.00
Kataller Toyama	2015	2015	12	5	4	3	41.67
Total			14	7	4	3	50.00
