= Tetsuya Asano =

Japanese footballer and manager

Tetsuya Asano 浅野 哲也
Personal information
- Full name: Tetsuya Asano
- Date of birth: February 23, 1967 (age 59)
- Place of birth: Hokota, Ibaraki, Japan
- Height: 1.85 m (6 ft 1 in)
- Position: Midfielder

Youth career
- 1982–1984: Hokota Daiichi High School

Senior career*
Years	Team	Apps	(Gls)
1985–1986	Toyota Shukyudan		
1987–1999	Nagoya Grampus Eight	245	(29)
1994	→Urawa Reds (loan)	29	(2)
2000	FC Tokyo	8	(0)
2001	Kawasaki Frontale	8	(0)
Total		290	(31)

International career
1991–1994	Japan	8	(1)

Managerial career
- 2011: Avispa Fukuoka
- 2013–2014: Iga FC Kunoichi
- 2015–2016: Kagoshima United FC
- 2017–2018: AC Nagano Parceiro
- 2024: Kagoshima United FC
Medal record
Nagoya Grampus Eight
Runner-up	J1 League	1996
Winner	Emperor's Cup	1995
Winner	Emperor's Cup	1999
- * Club domestic league appearances and goals

Tetsuya Asano (浅野 哲也, Asano Tetsuya; born February 23, 1967) is a Japanese professional football manager and former player who is the head coach of J3 League club Kagoshima United FC. He also played for the Japan national team.

== Club career ==
Asano was born in Hokota on February 23, 1967. After graduating from high school, he joined Japan Soccer League club Toyota Motors (later Nagoya Grampus Eight) in 1987. In 1992, Japan Soccer League was folded and founded new league J1 League. In 1994, he moved to Urawa Reds on loan. In 1995, he returned and the club won 1995 and 1999 Emperor's Cup. Toward the end of his career, he played at FC Tokyo (2000) and Kawasaki Frontale (2001). He retired in 2001.

== National team career ==
On June 2, 1991, Asano debuted for Japan national team against Thailand. He played 8 games and scored 1 goal for Japan until 1994.

== Coaching career ==
After retirement, Asano started coaching career at Shonan Bellmare in 2007. He moved to Avispa Fukuoka in 2010 and he became a manager as Yoshiyuki Shinoda successor in August 2011. However the club was relegated to J2 League and he resigned end of the season. In 2013, he signed with L.League club Iga FC Kunoichi and managed until September 2014. In 2015, he signed with Japan Football League club Kagoshima United FC. In 2015 season, the club won 4th place and was promoted to J3 League. In 2017, he moved to J3 League club AC Nagano Parceiro. He resigned in June 2018.

In May 2024, Asano returned to manage Kagoshima United FC after eight years, replacing outgoing manager Yasuaki Oshima.

== Career statistics ==
=== Club ===
Appearances and goals by club, season and competition
Club	Season	League			Emperor's Cup		J.League Cup		Total	
Club	Season	Division	Apps	Goals	Apps	Goals	Apps	Goals	Apps	Goals
Toyota Motors	1987/88	JSL Division 1	1	0			0	0	1	0
Toyota Motors	1988/89	JSL Division 2	10	2			1	0	11	2
Toyota Motors	1989/90	JSL Division 2	29	3	—		3	0	32	3
Toyota Motors	1990/91	JSL Division 1	22	6	—		2	0	24	6
Toyota Motors	1991/92	JSL Division 1	16	1	2	0	1	0	19	1
Toyota Motors	Total		77	12	2	0	7	0	87	12
Nagoya Grampus Eight	1992	J1 League	—		0	0	2	1	2	1
Nagoya Grampus Eight	1993	J1 League	20	1	3	1	0	0	23	2
Nagoya Grampus Eight	1994	J1 League	3	0	0	0	0	0	3	0
Nagoya Grampus Eight	Total		23	1	3	1	2	1	28	3
Urawa Reds	1994	J1 League	29	2	3	1	2	0	34	3
Nagoya Grampus Eight	1995	J1 League	50	4	5	3	—		55	7
Nagoya Grampus Eight	1996	J1 League	29	5	1	0	13	2	43	7
Nagoya Grampus Eight	1997	J1 League	29	4	1	0	10	0	40	4
Nagoya Grampus Eight	1998	J1 League	23	2	4	0	1	0	28	2
Nagoya Grampus Eight	1999	J1 League	13	1	0	0	2	0	15	1
Nagoya Grampus Eight	Total		144	16	11	3	26	2	181	21
FC Tokyo	2000	J1 League	8	0	0	0	0	0	8	0
Kawasaki Frontale	2001	J2 League	8	0	5	0	1	0	14	0
Total			290	31	24	5	38	3	352	39

=== International ===
Appearances and goals by national team and year
National team	Year	Apps	Goals
Japan	1991	2	0
Japan	1992	3	0
Japan	1993	0	0
Japan	1994	3	1
Total		8	1

=== Managerial ===
As of

Managerial record by team and tenure
Team	From	To	Record				
Team	From	To	P	W	D	L	Win %
Avispa Fukuoka	2011	2011	15	4	2	9	26.67
Kagoshima United FC	2016	2016	30	15	5	10	50.00
AC Nagano Parceiro	2017	2018	44	15	17	12	34.09
Kagoshima United FC	2024	Present	0	0	0	0	—
Total			89	34	24	31	38.20
