= Makoto Yonekura =

Japanese footballer

Makoto Yonekura 米倉 誠
Personal information
- Full name: Makoto Yonekura
- Date of birth: 28 December 1970 (age 55)
- Place of birth: Gunma, Japan
- Height: 1.76 m (5 ft 9 1/2 in)
- Position: Midfielder

Youth career
- 1986–1988: Maebashi Commercial High School

Senior career*
Years	Team	Apps	(Gls)
1989–1991	NKK	33	(2)
1991–1995	Nagoya Grampus Eight	114	(10)
1996–1998	Cerezo Osaka	41	(3)
Total		188	(15)
Medal record
Nagoya Grampus Eight
Winner	Emperor's Cup	1995
- * Club domestic league appearances and goals

Makoto Yonekura (米倉 誠, Yonekura Makoto; born 28 December 1970) is a former Japanese football player.

== Playing career ==
Yonekura was born in Gunma Prefecture on 28 December 1970. After graduating from high school, he joined NKK in 1989. He played many matches from first season. However the club was relegated to Division 2 in 1991 and he moved to Toyota Motors (later Nagoya Grampus Eight). He became a regular player and the club won the 3rd place in 1995. In 1996, he moved to Cerezo Osaka. However his opportunity to play decreased year by year. In 1998, he could hardly play in the match and retired end of 1998 season.

== Club statistics ==
Club performance			League		Cup		League Cup		Total	
Season	Club	League	Apps	Goals	Apps	Goals	Apps	Goals	Apps	Goals
Japan			League		Emperor's Cup		J.League Cup		Total	
1989/90	NKK	JSL Division 1	17	0			2	0	19	0
1990/91	NKK	JSL Division 1	16	2			2	0	18	2
1991/92	Toyota Motors	JSL Division 1	19	2			2	0	21	2
1992	Nagoya Grampus Eight	J1 League	-				10	0	10	0
1993	Nagoya Grampus Eight	J1 League	31	2	3	2	5	0	39	4
1994	Nagoya Grampus Eight	J1 League	25	3	0	0	1	0	26	3
1995	Nagoya Grampus Eight	J1 League	39	3	0	0	-		39	3
1996	Cerezo Osaka	J1 League	22	2	2	1	14	3	38	6
1997	Cerezo Osaka	J1 League	16	0	2	0	6	1	24	1
1998	Cerezo Osaka	J1 League	3	1	0	0	2	0	5	1
Total			188	15	7	3	44	4	239	22
