= Seiichi Ogawa =

Japanese footballer

Seiichi Ogawa 小川 誠一
Personal information
- Full name: Seiichi Ogawa
- Date of birth: 21 July 1970 (age 56)
- Place of birth: Chiba, Japan
- Height: 1.70 m (5 ft 7 in)
- Position: Defender

Team information
- Current team: Wyvern FC (manager)

Youth career
- 1986–1988: Funabashi High School

Senior career*
Years	Team	Apps	(Gls)
1989–2000	Nagoya Grampus Eight	217	(4)
Total		217	(4)

Managerial career
- 2020–2021: Wyvern FC (assistant)
- 2021–: Wyvern FC
Medal record
Nagoya Grampus Eight
Runner-up	J1 League	1996
Winner	Emperor's Cup	1995
Winner	Emperor's Cup	1999
- * Club domestic league appearances and goals

Seiichi Ogawa (小川 誠一, Ogawa Seiichi; born July 21, 1970) is a Japanese football manager and former player who plays as a defender. He currently manager of Wyvern FC.

== Club career ==
Ogawa was born in Chiba on July 21, 1970. After graduating from high school, he joined Toyota Motors (later Nagoya Grampus Eight) in 1989. He played many matches as left side back from first season and became a regular player from 1991. The club won the champions 1995 first major title in his history. In Asia, the club also won the 2nd place 1996–97 Asian Cup Winners' Cup. In 1998, he could not play at all in the match for injury. In 1999, he came back and the club won the champions 1999 Emperor's Cup. He retired at the end of the 2000 season.

== Managerial career ==
On 1 January 2021, Ogawa begin career as assistant manager of Wyvern FC until 31 August 2021. One day later, he promoted to manager his club on same year. On 13 November 2022, Ogawa brought his club promotion to the Tōkai Soccer League Division 1 for the first time in history after 2021 season finished in runner-up as well Tōkai Soccer League Division 2 champions.

== Club statistics ==
Club performance			League		Cup		League Cup		Total	
Season	Club	League	Apps	Goals	Apps	Goals	Apps	Goals	Apps	Goals
Japan			League		Emperor's Cup		J.League Cup		Total	
1989/90	Toyota Motors	JSL Division 2	21	0			3	0	24	0
1990/91	Toyota Motors	JSL Division 1	9	0			2	0	11	0
1991/92	Toyota Motors	JSL Division 1	17	1			0	0	17	1
1992	Nagoya Grampus Eight	J1 League	-		1	0	10	0	11	0
1993	Nagoya Grampus Eight	J1 League	32	1	3	0	5	0	40	1
1994	Nagoya Grampus Eight	J1 League	24	0	2	0	0	0	26	0
1995	Nagoya Grampus Eight	J1 League	33	0	5	0	-		38	0
1996	Nagoya Grampus Eight	J1 League	26	0	0	0	10	0	36	0
1997	Nagoya Grampus Eight	J1 League	27	1	0	0	7	0	34	1
1998	Nagoya Grampus Eight	J1 League	0	0	0	0	0	0	0	0
1999	Nagoya Grampus Eight	J1 League	11	1	5	0	1	0	17	1
2000	Nagoya Grampus Eight	J1 League	17	0	0	0	0	0	17	0
Total			217	4	16	0	38	0	271	4

== Managerial statistics ==
As of the start of 2023 season.

Managerial record by club and tenure
Team	From	To	Record				
Team	From	To	G	W	D	L	Win %
Wyvern FC	1 September 2021	present	23	21	1	1	91.30
Total			23	21	1	1	91.30

== Honours ==
=== Manager ===
Wyvern FC

- Tōkai Adult Soccer League Division 2: 2022
