= Ken Ishikawa (footballer) =

Japanese footballer (born 1970)

Ken Ishikawa 石川 研
Personal information
- Full name: Ken Ishikawa
- Date of birth: February 6, 1970 (age 56)
- Place of birth: Uruma, Japan
- Height: 1.82 m (5 ft 11 1/2 in)
- Position: Goalkeeper

Youth career
- 1985–1987: Ishikawa High School
- 1988–1991: Okinawa International University

Senior career*
Years	Team	Apps	(Gls)
1992–1996	Nagoya Grampus Eight	3	(0)
1997–2000	Vegalta Sendai	71	(0)
2001–2002	Mito HollyHock	32	(0)
2003	JEF United Ichihara	0	(0)
Total		106	(0)
Medal record
Nagoya Grampus Eight
Runner-up	J1 League	1996
Winner	Emperor's Cup	1995
- * Club domestic league appearances and goals

Ken Ishikawa (石川 研, Ishikawa Ken; born February 6, 1970) is a former Japanese football player.

== Playing career ==
Ishikawa was born in Uruma on February 6, 1970. After graduating from Okinawa International University, he joined Nagoya Grampus Eight in 1992. However he did not play as much as teammates Dido Havenaar and Yuji Ito. In 1996, he moved to the Japan Football League club Brummell Sendai (later Vegalta Sendai). He became a regular goalkeeper and the club was promoted to the J2 League in 1999. However he lost his regular position to Norio Takahashi. In 2001, he moved to Mito HollyHock and he played often over two seasons. In 2003, he moved to JEF United Ichihara. However he did not play as much as teammate Ryo Kushino and retired at the end of the 2003 season.

== Coaching career ==
After retirement, Ishikawa became a goalkeeper coach for JEF United Ichihara (later JEF United Chiba) in 2004. In 2007, he moved to Rissho University and became a manager. In 2009, he moved to his old club Nagoya Grampus and became a goalkeeper coach for the youth team. In 2016, he moved to Avispa Fukuoka and became a goalkeeper coach. He resigned at the end of 2016.

== Career statistics ==
Appearances and goals by club, season and competition
Club	Season	League			Emperor's Cup		J.League Cup		Total	
Club	Season	Division	Apps	Goals	Apps	Goals	Apps	Goals	Apps	Goals
Nagoya Grampus Eight	1992	J1 League	-		0	0	0	0	0	0
Nagoya Grampus Eight	1993	J1 League	0	0	0	0	0	0	0	0
Nagoya Grampus Eight	1994	J1 League	0	0	0	0	0	0	0	0
Nagoya Grampus Eight	1995	J1 League	2	0	2	0	-		4	0
Nagoya Grampus Eight	1996	J1 League	1	0	0	0	9	0	10	0
Brummell Sendai	1997	Football League	15	0	1	0	2	0	18	0
Brummell Sendai	1998	Football League	26	0	4	0	2	0	32	0
Vegalta Sendai	1999	J2 League	24	0	2	0	0	0	26	0
Vegalta Sendai	2000	J2 League	6	0	0	0	1	0	7	0
Mito HollyHock	2001	J2 League	15	0	2	0	0	0	17	0
Mito HollyHock	2002	J2 League	17	0	3	0	-		20	0
JEF United Ichihara	2003	J1 League	0	0	0	0	0	0	0	0
Career total			106	0	14	0	14	0	134	0
