= Masashi Shimamura =

Japanese footballer

Masashi Shimamura 島村 征志
Personal information
- Full name: Masashi Shimamura
- Date of birth: June 3, 1971 (age 55)
- Place of birth: Kumamoto, Japan
- Height: 1.67 m (5 ft 5 1/2 in)
- Position: Midfielder

Youth career
- 1987–1989: Ozu High School

Senior career*
Years	Team	Apps	(Gls)
1990–1995	Nagoya Grampus Eight		
Medal record
Nagoya Grampus Eight
Winner	Emperor's Cup	1995
- * Club domestic league appearances and goals

Masashi Shimamura (島村 征志, Shimamura Masashi; born June 3, 1971) is a former Japanese football player.

== Playing career ==
Shimamura was born in Kumamoto Prefecture on June 3, 1971. After graduating from Ozu High School, he joined Toyota Motors (later Nagoya Grampus Eight) in 1990. He played many matches as midfielder in 1992 J.League Cup and Grampus qualified to semifinals. He also played many matches in 1993 season. However he could not play at all in the match from 1994 and retired end of 1995 season.

== Career statistics ==
Appearances and goals by club, season and competition
Club	Season	League			Emperor's Cup		J.League Cup		Total	
Club	Season	Division	Apps	Goals	Apps	Goals	Apps	Goals	Apps	Goals
Toyota Motors	1990–91	JSL Division 1								
Toyota Motors	1991–92	JSL Division 1								
Nagoya Grampus Eight	1992	J1 League	—				8	3	8	3
Nagoya Grampus Eight	1993	J1 League	14	1	0	0	0	0	14	1
Nagoya Grampus Eight	1994	J1 League	0	0			0	0	0	0
Nagoya Grampus Eight	1995	J1 League	0	0			—		0	0
Career total			14	1	0	0	8	3	22	4
