= Elivélton (footballer, born 1971) =

Brazilian footballer

Personal information
- Full name: Elivélton Alves Rufino
- Date of birth: 31 July 1971 (age 55)
- Place of birth: Serrania, Brazil
- Height: 1.72 m (5 ft 8 in)
- Position: Midfielder

Youth career
- Esportivo de Passos

Senior career*
Years	Team	Apps	(Gls)
1990–1993	São Paulo	49	(2)
1993–1994	Nagoya Grampus Eight	46	(7)
1995	Corinthians	20	(2)
1996	Palmeiras	23	(2)
1997	Cruzeiro	20	(5)
1998	Vitória	20	(2)
1999–2000	Internacional	28	(5)
2001–2003	Ponte Preta	44	(6)
2003–2004	São Caetano	8	(0)
2004–2005	Bahia		
2006	Uberlândia		
2006	Vitória-ES		
2006–2007	União Rondonópolis		
2007–	Francana		

International career
1991–1992	Brazil Olympic team	4	(2)
1991–1993	Brazil	13	(1)
- * Club domestic league appearances and goals

Elivélton Alves Rufino, commonly known simply as Elivélton (born 31 July 1971), is a Brazilian former footballer who played as a midfielder for several Campeonato Brasileiro Série A clubs. He also played for the Brazil national team.

== Club career ==
Born in Serrania, Minas Gerais state, Elivélton started his professional career in 1990, when he joined São Paulo, after leaving his youth club Esportiva de Passos. Defending São Paulo, he won the Campeonato Paulista in 1991 and in 1992, the Série A in 1991, the Copa Libertadores in 1992 and in 1993, and the Intercontinental Cup in 1993. In 1994, he won the J1 League, being awarded as the best foreigner player in the league, while playing for Nagoya Grampus Eight. He then was transferred to Corinthians, and won that season's Copa do Brasil and the Campeonato Paulista. Elivélton won the Campeonato Paulista again, in 1996, this time with Corinthians' biggest rival, Palmeiras. After joining Cruzeiro in 1997, he won the Copa Libertadores again, and also won the Campeonato Mineiro. In the subsequent years, he played for several clubs, Internacional, Ponte Preta, São Caetano, Bahia, Uberlândia, Vitória-ES, and União Rondonópolis. Elivélton won the Campeonato Capixaba in 2006, while defending Vitória-ES. He joined Francana in 2007, after spending some time training in his academy in Alfenas, Minas Gerais state.

== International career ==
He played four games, between 1991 and 1992, scoring two goals for the Brazilian Olympic team. Both goals were scored on January 22, 1991, against the United States team. Elivélton played eleven games for the Brazilian main team, including two Copa América games in 1993, respectively against Peru on June 18, and Chile on June 21. The first game was played on October 30, 1991, against Yugoslavia, while the last game was played on August 8, 1993, against Mexico. His only goal was scored on December 18, 1991, against Czechoslovakia.

== Career statistics ==
=== Club ===
Club performance			League	
Season	Club	League	Apps	Goals
Brazil			League	
1990	São Paulo	Série A	14	1
1991	São Paulo	Série A	19	1
1992	São Paulo	Série A	16	0
Japan			League	
1993	Nagoya Grampus Eight	J1 League	9	2
1994	Nagoya Grampus Eight	J1 League	15	5
Brazil			League	
1995	Corinthians Paulista	Série A	20	2
1996	Palmeiras	Série A	23	2
1997	Cruzeiro	Série A	20	5
1998	Vitória	Série A	20	2
1999	Internacional	Série A	12	0
2000	Internacional	Série A	16	4
2001	Ponte Preta	Série A	22	1
2002	Ponte Preta	Série A	22	5
2003	Ponte Preta	Série A	0	0
2003	São Caetano	Série A	8	0
Country	Brazil		212	23
Country	Japan		24	7
Total			236	30

=== International ===
Brazil national team
Year	Apps	Goals
1991	2	1
1992	3	0
1993	8	0
Total	13	1
