= Naoki Mori (footballer, born 1972) =

Japanese footballer

Naoki Mori 森 直樹
Personal information
- Full name: Naoki Mori
- Date of birth: May 5, 1972 (age 54)
- Place of birth: Nagasaki, Japan
- Height: 1.82 m (5 ft 11 1/2 in)
- Position: Defender

Youth career
- Kunimi High School

Senior career*
| Years | Team | Apps | (Gls) |
| ????–1995 | Nagoya Grampus Eight | | |
| 1996–1997 | Vissel Kobe | | |
| 1998 | Omiya Ardija | | |
Medal record
Nagoya Grampus Eight
| Winner | Emperor's Cup | 1995 |
- * Club domestic league appearances and goals

Naoki Mori (森 直樹, Mori Naoki; born May 5, 1972) is a former Japanese football player.

== Playing career ==
Mori was born in Nagasaki Prefecture on May 5, 1972. He played for Nagoya Grampus Eight. He played many matches as center back from 1994. The club won the champions 1995 Emperor's Cup first major title in club history. In 1996, he moved to Japan Football League (JFL) club Vissel Kobe. The club won the 2nd place in 1996 and was promoted to J1 League. In 1998, he moved to JFL club Omiya Ardija and retired at the end of the 1998 season.

== Career statistics ==
Appearances and goals by club, season and competition
| Club | Season | League | | | Emperor's Cup | | J.League Cup | | Total | |
| Club | Season | Division | Apps | Goals | Apps | Goals | Apps | Goals | Apps | Goals |
|---|---|---|---|---|---|---|---|---|---|---|
| Nagoya Grampus Eight | 1992 | J1 League | — | | | | 0 | 0 | 0 | 0 |
| Nagoya Grampus Eight | 1993 | J1 League | 3 | 1 | 3 | 1 | 5 | 0 | 11 | 2 |
| Nagoya Grampus Eight | 1994 | J1 League | 28 | 1 | 2 | 0 | 1 | 1 | 31 | 2 |
| Nagoya Grampus Eight | 1995 | J1 League | 15 | 2 | 4 | 1 | — | | 19 | 3 |
| Vissel Kobe | 1996 | Football League | | | | | | | | |
| Vissel Kobe | 1997 | J1 League | 6 | 0 | 0 | 0 | 4 | 0 | 10 | 0 |
| Omiya Ardija | 1998 | Football League | | | | | | | | |
| Career total | | | 52 | 4 | 9 | 2 | 10 | 1 | 71 | 7 |
