= Garça (footballer) =

Brazilian footballer (born 1967)

Personal information
- Full name: Edson Rodrigues
- Date of birth: March 13, 1967 (age 59)
- Place of birth: Brazil
- Height: 1.83 m (6 ft 0 in)
- Position: Defender

Senior career*
Years	Team	Apps	(Gls)
1992–1994	Nagoya Grampus Eight	52	(4)
- * Club domestic league appearances and goals

Edson Rodrigues (born March 13, 1967) is a former Brazilian football player. He has played for Nagoya Grampus Eight.

== Career statistics ==
Appearances and goals by club, season and competition
Club	Season	League			Emperor's Cup		J.League Cup		Total	
Club	Season	Division	Apps	Goals	Apps	Goals	Apps	Goals	Apps	Goals
Nagoya Grampus Eight	1992	J1 League	—				9	0	9	0
Nagoya Grampus Eight	1993	J1 League	29	3	3	0	4	0	36	3
Nagoya Grampus Eight	1994	J1 League	23	1	2	0	0	0	25	1
Career total			52	4	5	0	13	0	70	0
