= Toshiyuki Kosugi =

Japanese footballer

Toshiyuki Kosugi 小杉 敏之
Personal information
- Full name: Toshiyuki Kosugi
- Date of birth: June 20, 1968 (age 58)
- Place of birth: Tokyo, Japan
- Height: 1.70 m (5 ft 7 in)
- Position: Defender

Youth career
- Gyosei High School
- Doshisha University

Senior career*
Years	Team	Apps	(Gls)
1992–1995	Nagoya Grampus Eight	63	(2)
1996–1997	Brummell Sendai	21	(0)
Total		84	(2)
Medal record
Nagoya Grampus Eight
Winner	Emperor's Cup	1995
- * Club domestic league appearances and goals

Toshiyuki Kosugi (小杉 敏之, Kosugi Toshiyuki; born June 20, 1968) is a former Japanese football player.

== Playing career ==
Kosugi was born in Tokyo on June 20, 1968. After graduating from Doshisha University, he joined the J1 League club Nagoya Grampus Eight in 1992. He played often, mainly as side back, during his first season. However his opportunity to play decreased in 1995. He moved to the Japan Football League club Brummell Sendai in 1996. Although he played often in 1996, his opportunity to play decreased in 1997 and he retired at the end of the 1997 season.

== Career statistics ==
Appearances and goals by club, season and competition
Club	Season	League			Emperor's Cup		J.League Cup		Total	
Club	Season	Division	Apps	Goals	Apps	Goals	Apps	Goals	Apps	Goals
Nagoya Grampus Eight	1992	J1 League	—				7	0	7	0
Nagoya Grampus Eight	1993	J1 League	20	0	2	1	1	0	23	1
Nagoya Grampus Eight	1994	J1 League	36	1	0	0	1	0	37	1
Nagoya Grampus Eight	1995	J1 League	7	1	0	0	—		7	1
Brummell Sendai	1996	Football League	16	0	3	0	—		19	0
Brummell Sendai	1997	Football League	5	0	0	0	6	0	11	0
Career total			84	2	5	1	15	0	104	3
