= Kazuhisa Iijima =

Japanese footballer (born 1970)

Kazuhisa Iijima 飯島 寿久
Personal information
- Full name: Kazuhisa Iijima
- Date of birth: January 6, 1970 (age 56)
- Place of birth: Machida, Tokyo, Japan
- Height: 1.77 m (5 ft 9 1/2 in)
- Position: Defender

Youth career
- 1985–1987: Teikyo High School
- 1988–1991: Tokai University

Senior career*
Years	Team	Apps	(Gls)
1992–2000	Nagoya Grampus Eight	179	(1)
2001	Kawasaki Frontale	43	(1)
2002	Avispa Fukuoka	34	(1)
Total		256	(3)
Medal record
Nagoya Grampus Eight
Runner-up	J1 League	1996
Winner	Emperor's Cup	1995
Winner	Emperor's Cup	1999
- * Club domestic league appearances and goals

Kazuhisa Iijima (飯島 寿久, Iijima Kazuhisa; born January 6, 1970) is a former Japanese football player.

== Playing career ==
Iijima was born in Machida on January 6, 1970. After graduating from Tokai University, he joined Nagoya Grampus Eight in 1992. He played often as right side back during the 1993 season. In 1995, the club won the Emperor's Cup, the first major title in club history. In 1997, the club won second place in the Asian Cup Winners' Cup. However, he did not play as much in 1998, less than Ko Ishikawa, who came to the club in 1998. In 2001, he moved to the J2 League club Kawasaki Frontale and he played in many matches. In 2002, he moved to the J2 club Avispa Fukuoka. Although he played in many matches, he left the club and he retired at the end of the 2002 season.

== Club statistics ==
Club performance			League		Cup		League Cup		Total	
Season	Club	League	Apps	Goals	Apps	Goals	Apps	Goals	Apps	Goals
Japan			League		Emperor's Cup		J.League Cup		Total	
1992	Nagoya Grampus Eight	J1 League	-				1	0	1	0
1993	Nagoya Grampus Eight	J1 League	18	0	0	0	3	0	21	0
1994	Nagoya Grampus Eight	J1 League	31	0	2	0	1	0	34	0
1995	Nagoya Grampus Eight	J1 League	45	0	5	0	-		50	0
1996	Nagoya Grampus Eight	J1 League	29	1	1	0	11	0	41	1
1997	Nagoya Grampus Eight	J1 League	30	0	1	0	10	0	41	0
1998	Nagoya Grampus Eight	J1 League	12	0	3	0	3	0	18	0
1999	Nagoya Grampus Eight	J1 League	9	0	2	0	2	0	13	0
2000	Nagoya Grampus Eight	J1 League	5	0	1	0	1	0	7	0
2001	Kawasaki Frontale	J2 League	43	1	6	0	3	0	52	1
2002	Avispa Fukuoka	J2 League	34	1	1	0	-		35	1
Total			256	3	22	0	35	0	313	3
