= Yasuyuki Moriyama =

Japanese footballer

Yasuyuki Moriyama 森山 泰行
Personal information
- Full name: Yasuyuki Moriyama
- Date of birth: May 1, 1969 (age 57)
- Place of birth: Gifu, Japan
- Height: 1.71 m (5 ft 7 1/2 in)
- Position: Forward

Youth career
- 1985–1987: Teikyo High School
- 1988–1991: Juntendo University

Senior career*
Years	Team	Apps	(Gls)
1992–2004	Nagoya Grampus Eight	182	(63)
1998	→ Bellmare Hiratsuka (loan)	4	(0)
1998–1999	→ HIT Gorica (loan)	10	(1)
1999	→ Sanfrecce Hiroshima (loan)	11	(3)
2000	→ Kawasaki Frontale (loan)	14	(0)
2002–2003	→ Consadole Sapporo (loan)	9	(0)
2005–2008	FC Gifu	40	(8)
2019–2020	Maruyasu Okazaki	0	(0)
Total		230	(75)

International career
1997	Japan	1	(0)
Medal record
Nagoya Grampus Eight
Runner-up	J1 League	1996
Winner	Emperor's Cup	1995
Sanfrecce Hiroshima
Runner-up	Emperor's Cup	1999
Kawasaki Frontale
Runner-up	J.League Cup	2000
- * Club domestic league appearances and goals

Yasuyuki Moriyama (森山 泰行, Moriyama Yasuyuki; born May 1, 1969) is a former Japanese football player. He played for Japan's national team.

== Club career ==
Moriyama was born in Gifu on May 1, 1969. After graduating from Juntendo University, he joined Nagoya Grampus Eight in 1992. The club won the champions at 1995 Emperor's Cup. In Asia, the club won the 2nd place at 1996–97 Asian Cup Winners' Cup. From the late 1990s, he moved to many clubs Bellmare Hiratsuka (1998), HIT Gorica (1998–99), Sanfrecce Hiroshima (1999), Kawasaki Frontale (2000) and Consadole Sapporo (2002–03).

In July 2004, he announced his retirement at Nagoya Grampus Eight. In 2005, he came back as player at his local club FC Gifu played in Regional Leagues. The club was promoted to Japan Football League in 2007 and J2 League in 2008. He retired end of 2008 season.

In February 2019, he took the job of player-team director at Japan Football League club FC Maruyasu Okazaki. Although he was registered as a player for two seasons until 2020, he did not play in the match.

== National team career ==
On June 15, 1997, Moriyama debuted for Japan national team against Turkey.

== Club statistics ==
Club performance			League		Cup		League Cup		Total	
Season	Club	League	Apps	Goals	Apps	Goals	Apps	Goals	Apps	Goals
Japan			League		Emperor's Cup		J.League Cup		Total	
1992	Nagoya Grampus Eight	J1 League	-		1	1	4	0	5	1
1993	Nagoya Grampus Eight	J1 League	12	4	1	1	0	0	13	5
1994	Nagoya Grampus Eight	J1 League	39	13	2	1	1	0	42	14
1995	Nagoya Grampus Eight	J1 League	42	14	4	0	-		46	14
1996	Nagoya Grampus Eight	J1 League	26	11	1	0	14	4	41	15
1997	Nagoya Grampus Eight	J1 League	29	9	1	0	5	1	35	10
1998	Bellmare Hiratsuka	J1 League	4	0	2	0	0	0	6	0
Slovenia			League		Pokal Hervis		League Cup		Total	
1998/99	HIT Gorica	PrvaLiga	10	1					10	1
Japan			League		Emperor's Cup		J.League Cup		Total	
1999	Sanfrecce Hiroshima	J1 League	11	3	3	0	0	0	14	3
2000	Kawasaki Frontale	J1 League	14	0	1	0	5	0	20	0
2001	Nagoya Grampus Eight	J1 League	26	12	1	0	3	0	30	12
2002	Nagoya Grampus Eight	J1 League	7	0	0	0	5	0	12	0
2002	Consadole Sapporo	J1 League	4	0	3	0	0	0	7	0
2003	Consadole Sapporo	J2 League	5	0	0	0	-		5	0
2004	Nagoya Grampus Eight	J1 League	1	0	0	0	0	0	1	0
2005	FC Gifu	JRL (Tōkai)	8	2	-		-		8	2
2006	FC Gifu	JRL (Tōkai)	11	5	2	1	-		13	6
2007	FC Gifu	JFL	8	0	3	1	-		11	1
2008	FC Gifu	J2 League	13	1	0	0	-		13	1
2019	Maruyasu Okazaki	JFL	0	0	-		-		0	0
2020	Maruyasu Okazaki	JFL	0	0	0	0	-		0	0
Country	Japan		260	74	23	5	39	5	322	84
Country	Slovenia		10	1					10	1
Total			270	75	23	5	39	5	332	85

== National team statistics ==
Japan national team
Year	Apps	Goals
1997	1	0
Total	1	0

== Honours ==
- Slovenian PrvaLiga Runner-up: 1998-99
