= Yuji Sugano =

Japanese footballer

Yuji Sugano 菅野 裕二
Personal information
- Full name: Yuji Sugano
- Date of birth: April 14, 1961 (age 65)
- Place of birth: Aichi, Japan
- Height: 1.74 m (5 ft 8 1/2 in)
- Position: Midfielder

Youth career
- Okazaki Josei High School
- Osaka University of Commerce

Senior career*
Years	Team	Apps	(Gls)
????–1992	Nagoya Grampus Eight		

International career
1988	Japan	1	(0)
- * Club domestic league appearances and goals

Yuji Sugano (菅野 裕二, Sugano Yuji; born April 14, 1961) is a former Japanese football player. He played for Japan national team.

== Club career ==
Sugano was born in Aichi Prefecture on April 14, 1961. After graduating from Osaka University of Commerce, he joined his local club Toyota Motors (later Nagoya Grampus Eight). In 1992, Japan Soccer League was folded and founded new league J1 League. However, he retired in 1992 without playing in J1 League.

== National team career ==
On February 2, 1988, Sugano debuted for Japan national team against Oman.

== Club statistics ==
Club performance			League		Cup		League Cup		Total	
Season	Club	League	Apps	Goals	Apps	Goals	Apps	Goals	Apps	Goals
Japan			League		Emperor's Cup		J.League Cup		Total	
1987/88	Toyota Motors	JSL Division 1	16	0						
1988/89	Toyota Motors	JSL Division 2								
1989/90	Toyota Motors	JSL Division 2	16	1			1	1	17	2
1990/91	Toyota Motors	JSL Division 1	7	0			2	0	9	0
1991/92	Toyota Motors	JSL Division 1	3	0			2	0	5	0
1992	Nagoya Grampus Eight	J1 League	-				0	0	0	0
Total			42	1	0	0	5	1	47	2

== National team statistics ==
Japan national team
Year	Apps	Goals
1988	1	0
Total	1	0
