= Taro Goto =

Japanese footballer (born 1969)

Taro Goto 後藤 太郎
Personal information
- Full name: Taro Goto
- Date of birth: December 24, 1969 (age 56)
- Place of birth: Hiroshima, Japan
- Height: 1.64 m (5 ft 4 1/2 in)
- Positions: Forward; midfielder

Youth career
- 1985–1987: Tokai University Daigo High School
- 1988–1991: Tokai University

Senior career*
Years	Team	Apps	(Gls)
1992–1995	Nagoya Grampus Eight	45	(7)
1995–1996	JEF United Ichihara	12	(1)
1997–1998	Sagan Tosu	37	(2)
Total		94	(10)
Medal record
Nagoya Grampus Eight
Winner	Emperor's Cup	1995
- * Club domestic league appearances and goals

Taro Goto (後藤 太郎, Gotō Tarō; born December 24, 1969) is a former Japanese football player.

== Playing career ==
Goto was born in Hiroshima Prefecture on December 24, 1969. After graduating from Tokai University, he joined Nagoya Grampus Eight in 1992. He played many matches as forward and offensive midfielder from first season. However he lost his opportunity to play in 1995 and he moved to JEF United Ichihara. However he could hardly play in the match in 1996. In 1997, he moved to Japan Football League club Sagan Tosu. He played for the club many matches in 2 seasons and retired end of 1998 season.

== Club statistics ==
Club performance			League		Cup		League Cup		Total	
Season	Club	League	Apps	Goals	Apps	Goals	Apps	Goals	Apps	Goals
Japan			League		Emperor's Cup		J.League Cup		Total	
1992	Nagoya Grampus Eight	J1 League	-		0	0	7	1	7	1
1993	Nagoya Grampus Eight	J1 League	21	6	0	0	0	0	21	6
1994	Nagoya Grampus Eight	J1 League	24	1	2	0	0	0	26	1
1995	Nagoya Grampus Eight	J1 League	0	0	0	0	-		0	0
1995	JEF United Ichihara	J1 League	12	1	1	0	-		13	1
1996	JEF United Ichihara	J1 League	0	0	0	0	3	0	3	0
1997	Sagan Tosu	Football League	15	1	1	0	5	0	21	1
1998	Sagan Tosu	Football League	22	1	0	0	-		22	1
Total			94	10	4	0	15	1	113	11
