= Yuji Ito (footballer) =

Japanese footballer

Yuji Ito 伊藤 裕二
Personal information
- Full name: Yuji Ito
- Date of birth: May 20, 1965 (age 61)
- Place of birth: Kuwana, Mie, Japan
- Height: 1.82 m (5 ft 11 1/2 in)
- Position: Goalkeeper

Youth career
- 1981–1983: Yokkaichi Chuo Technical High School

Senior career*
Years	Team	Apps	(Gls)
1984–1992	Yanmar Diesel	85	(0)
1992–1999	Nagoya Grampus Eight	182	(0)
2000–2002	Shonan Bellmare	79	(0)
Total		346	(0)
Medal record
Yanmar Diesel
Winner	JSL Cup	1984
Nagoya Grampus Eight
Runner-up	J1 League	1996
Winner	Emperor's Cup	1995
Winner	Emperor's Cup	1999
- * Club domestic league appearances and goals

Yuji Ito (伊藤 裕二, Itō Yūji; born May 20, 1965) is a former Japanese football player.

== Playing career ==
Ito was born in Kuwana on May 20, 1965. After graduating from high school, he joined Yanmar Diesel in 1984. He became a regular goalkeeper in 1989. In 1992, he moved to Nagoya Grampus Eight. He played many often while battling with Dido Havenaar for the position. In 1995, Havenaar left the club and Ito became a completely regular goalkeeper. The club won the championship in the 1995 Emperor's Cup, the first major title in the club's history. The club also won second place in the 1996 J1 League and the 1996–97 Asian Cup Winners' Cup. However, the club gained Japan national team goalkeeper Seigo Narazaki in 1999 and Ito lost his regular position. He moved to the J2 League club Shonan Bellmare in 2000. He retired at the end of the 2002 season.

== Club statistics ==
Club performance			League		Cup		League Cup		Total	
Season	Club	League	Apps	Goals	Apps	Goals	Apps	Goals	Apps	Goals
Japan			League		Emperor's Cup		J.League Cup		Total	
1984	Yanmar Diesel	JSL Division 1								
1985/86	Yanmar Diesel	JSL Division 1								
1986/87	Yanmar Diesel	JSL Division 1								
1987/88	Yanmar Diesel	JSL Division 1								
1988/89	Yanmar Diesel	JSL Division 1								
1989/90	Yanmar Diesel	JSL Division 1	20	0			2	0	22	0
1990/91	Yanmar Diesel	JSL Division 1	22	0			2	0	22	0
1991/92	Yanmar Diesel	JSL Division 2	30	0			1	0	31	0
1992	Nagoya Grampus Eight	J1 League	-		0	0	0	0	0	0
1993	Nagoya Grampus Eight	J1 League	17	0	3	0	5	0	25	0
1994	Nagoya Grampus Eight	J1 League	19	0	2	0	1	0	22	0
1995	Nagoya Grampus Eight	J1 League	49	0	3	0	-		52	0
1996	Nagoya Grampus Eight	J1 League	29	0	1	0	5	0	35	0
1997	Nagoya Grampus Eight	J1 League	32	0	1	0	10	0	43	0
1998	Nagoya Grampus Eight	J1 League	29	0	2	0	4	0	35	0
1999	Nagoya Grampus Eight	J1 League	7	0	0	0	2	0	9	0
2000	Shonan Bellmare	J2 League	22	0	0	0	0	0	22	0
2001	Shonan Bellmare	J2 League	38	0	2	0	1	0	41	0
2002	Shonan Bellmare	J2 League	19	0	0	0	-		19	0
Total			333	0	14	0	33	0	380	0
