= Serrania =

Brazilian city in the state of Minas Gerais

Coordinates: 21.5478°S 46.04°W

- Municipality
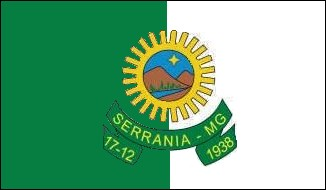
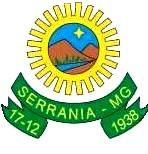
- Flag Coat of arms
- Interactive map of Serrania
- Country: Brazil
- State: Minas Gerais
- Region: Southeast
- Time zone: UTC−3 (BRT)

Location of Serrania within Minas Gerais

Serrania is a Brazilian municipality in the state of Minas Gerais. As of 2020, its population was estimated to be 7,668. The city has an area of 211,48 square kilometers. The population density is about 37/km^{2}. The elevation is 895 meters.

The city belongs to the mesoregion of Sul/Sudoeste de Minas and to the microregion of Alfenas.

== See also ==
- List of municipalities in Minas Gerais
