= Norifumi Takamoto =

Japanese footballer

Norifumi Takamoto 高本 詞史
Personal information
- Full name: Norifumi Takamoto
- Date of birth: December 31, 1967 (age 58)
- Place of birth: Miyazaki, Japan
- Height: 1.94 m (6 ft 4 1/2 in)
- Position: Defender

Youth career
- 1983–1985: Miyazaki Technical High School
- 1986–1989: Fukuoka University

Senior career*
Years	Team	Apps	(Gls)
1990–1992	Toshiba		
1993	Nagoya Grampus Eight	9	(0)
1994–1996	Kyoto Purple Sanga	21	(3)
Total		30	(3)
- * Club domestic league appearances and goals

Norifumi Takamoto (高本 詞史, Takamoto Norifumi; born December 31, 1967) is a former Japanese football player.

== Playing career ==
Takamoto was born in Miyazaki Prefecture on December 31, 1967. After graduating from Fukuoka University, he joined Toshiba in 1990. He played for the club in 2 seasons. In 1993, he moved to Nagoya Grampus Eight. In 1994, he moved to Japan Football League club Kyoto Purple Sanga. Although he played as mainly defender, he also played as forward. The club was promoted to J1 League in 1996. He retired end of 1996 season.

== Club statistics ==
Club performance			League		Cup		League Cup		Total	
Season	Club	League	Apps	Goals	Apps	Goals	Apps	Goals	Apps	Goals
Japan			League		Emperor's Cup		J.League Cup		Total	
1990/91	Toshiba	JSL Division 1								
1991/92	Toshiba	JSL Division 1								
1993	Nagoya Grampus Eight	J1 League	9	0	0	0	1	0	10	0
1994	Kyoto Purple Sanga	Football League	8	1	0	0	-		8	1
1995	Kyoto Purple Sanga	Football League	10	2	1	0	-		11	2
1996	Kyoto Purple Sanga	J1 League	3	0	0	0	0	0	3	0
Total			30	3	1	0	1	0	32	3
