= Pedro Pedrucci =

Uruguayan footballer (born 1961)

Personal information
- Full name: Pedro Catalino Pedrucci Valerio
- Date of birth: 30 September 1961 (age 65)
- Place of birth: Montevideo, Uruguay
- Height: 1.80 m (5 ft 11 in)
- Position: Midfielder

Senior career*
Years	Team	Apps	(Gls)
1979–1982	C.A. Progreso		
1983-1984	Nacional	44	(16)
1984–1986	Stade Lavallois	35	(6)
1987	C.A. Progreso		
1988	Deportivo Quito		
1988	Defensor Sporting		
1989	C.A. Progreso		
1990–1992	Toshiba	40	(14)
1992	C.A. Peñarol		
1993–1995	Toshiba		
1996–1997	C.A. Rentistas		
1998	Villa Española		
1999	C.A. Progreso		
2000	River Plate Montevideo		
2001–2002	Liverpool Montevideo		
2003	C.A. Rentistas		

International career
1990	Uruguay	2	(1)
- * Club domestic league appearances and goals

Pedro Catalino Pedrucci Valerio (born 30 September 1961) is a Uruguayan former football player.

== Career statistics ==
=== International ===
Appearances and goals by national team and year
National team	Year	Apps	Goals
Uruguay	1990	2	1
Total		2	1

Scores and results list Uruguay's goal tally first, score column indicates score after each Pedrucci goal.

List of international goals scored by Pedro Pedrucci
No.	Date	Venue	Opponent	Score	Result	Competition
1	3 February 1990	Miami Orange Bowl, Miami, United States	Colombia	1–0	2–0	Friendly
