= Otohiko Kiyono =

Japanese footballer

Otohiko Kiyono 清野 乙彦
Personal information
- Full name: Otohiko Kiyono
- Date of birth: April 23, 1973 (age 53)
- Place of birth: Kanagawa, Japan
- Height: 1.72 m (5 ft 7 1/2 in)
- Position: Defender

Youth career
- 1989–1991: Teikyo High School

Senior career*
Years	Team	Apps	(Gls)
1992–1995	Nagoya Grampus Eight	0	(0)
1993	→Osnabrück (loan)		
Medal record
Nagoya Grampus Eight
Winner	Emperor's Cup	1995
- * Club domestic league appearances and goals

Otohiko Kiyono (清野 乙彦, Otohiko Kiyono; born April 23, 1973) is a former Japanese football player.

== Club career ==
Kiyono was born in Kanagawa on April 23, 1973. After graduating from high school, he joined Nagoya Grampus Eight in 1992. He debuted in 1992 J.League Cup. In 1992, he moved to German Osnabrück on loan. In 1993, he returned to Grampus Eight. However he could not play at all in the match and retired at the end of the 1995 season.

== Club statistics ==
Club performance			League		League Cup		Total	
Season	Club	League	Apps	Goals	Apps	Goals	Apps	Goals
Japan			League		J.League Cup		Total	
1992	Nagoya Grampus Eight	J1 League	-		4	0	4	0
1994	Nagoya Grampus Eight	J1 League	0	0	0	0	0	0
1995	Nagoya Grampus Eight	J1 League	0	0	-		0	0
Total			0	0	4	0	4	0
