= Mitsutoshi Tsushima =

Japanese footballer

Mitsutoshi Tsushima 津島 三敏
Personal information
- Full name: Mitsutoshi Tsushima
- Date of birth: July 30, 1974 (age 52)
- Place of birth: Shizuoka, Japan
- Height: 1.71 m (5 ft 7 1/2 in)
- Position: Defender

Youth career
- 1990–1992: Shimizu Commercial High School

Senior career*
Years	Team	Apps	(Gls)
1993–1995	Nagoya Grampus Eight	38	(0)
2005	FC Gifu	14	(0)
Total		52	(0)
Medal record
Nagoya Grampus Eight
Winner	Emperor's Cup	1995
- * Club domestic league appearances and goals

Mitsutoshi Tsushima (津島 三敏, Tsushima Mitsutoshi; born July 30, 1974) is a former Japanese football player.

== Playing career ==
Tsushima was born in Shizuoka Prefecture on July 30, 1974. After graduating from Shimizu Commercial High School, he joined Nagoya Grampus Eight in 1993. He played many matches as side back. However he retired at the end of the 1995 season. In 2005, he came back as player at Regional Leagues club FC Gifu and played in 1 season.

== Club statistics ==
Club performance			League		Cup		League Cup		Total	
Season	Club	League	Apps	Goals	Apps	Goals	Apps	Goals	Apps	Goals
Japan			League		Emperor's Cup		J.League Cup		Total	
1993	Nagoya Grampus Eight	J1 League	1	0	0	0	0	0	1	0
1994	Nagoya Grampus Eight	J1 League	10	0	0	0	0	0	10	0
1995	Nagoya Grampus Eight	J1 League	27	0	0	0	-		27	0
2005	FC Gifu	Regional Leagues	14	0	-		-		14	0
Total			52	0	0	0	0	0	52	0
