= Márcio (footballer, born 1971) =

Brazilian footballer and agent (1971–2007)

Personal information
- Full name: Márcio Rogério de Andrade
- Date of birth: July 30, 1971
- Place of birth: Brazil
- Date of death: 17 July 2007 (aged 35)
- Height: 1.78 m (5 ft 10 in)
- Position: Forward

Senior career*
Years	Team	Apps	(Gls)
–1992	Araçatuba		
1992	Nagoya Grampus Eight		
- * Club domestic league appearances and goals

Márcio Rogério de Andrade (July 30, 1971 – July 17, 2007) was a Brazilian football player and a FIFA accredited football agent. Márcio and his family died on July 17, 2007, in the crash of an Airbus A320 operating as TAM Airlines Flight 3054.

== Death ==
Andrade was one of the 199 fatal victims of the TAM Airlines Flight 3054 crash at São Paulo, Brazil (the deadliest air disaster in Brazilian territory), along with his family (including his spouse Melissa Ura Andrade, his daughter Alanis Ura Andrade and his brother-in-law André Doná Ura).

They went to Porto Alegre, where they attended a party at a farmhouse owned by the football player Ronaldinho Gaúcho, while Andrade was making a deal about a contract with the player, along with Gaúcho's brother and agent, Assis Moreira, and they were returning home on an Airbus A320 that crashed during landing at Congonhas Airport.
