= Mie Suzuka Sports Garden =

Athletic complex in Suzuka, Mie, Japan

Coordinates: 34°50′04″N 136°30′57″E

Mie Sports Garden
- 三重県営鈴鹿スポーツガーデン
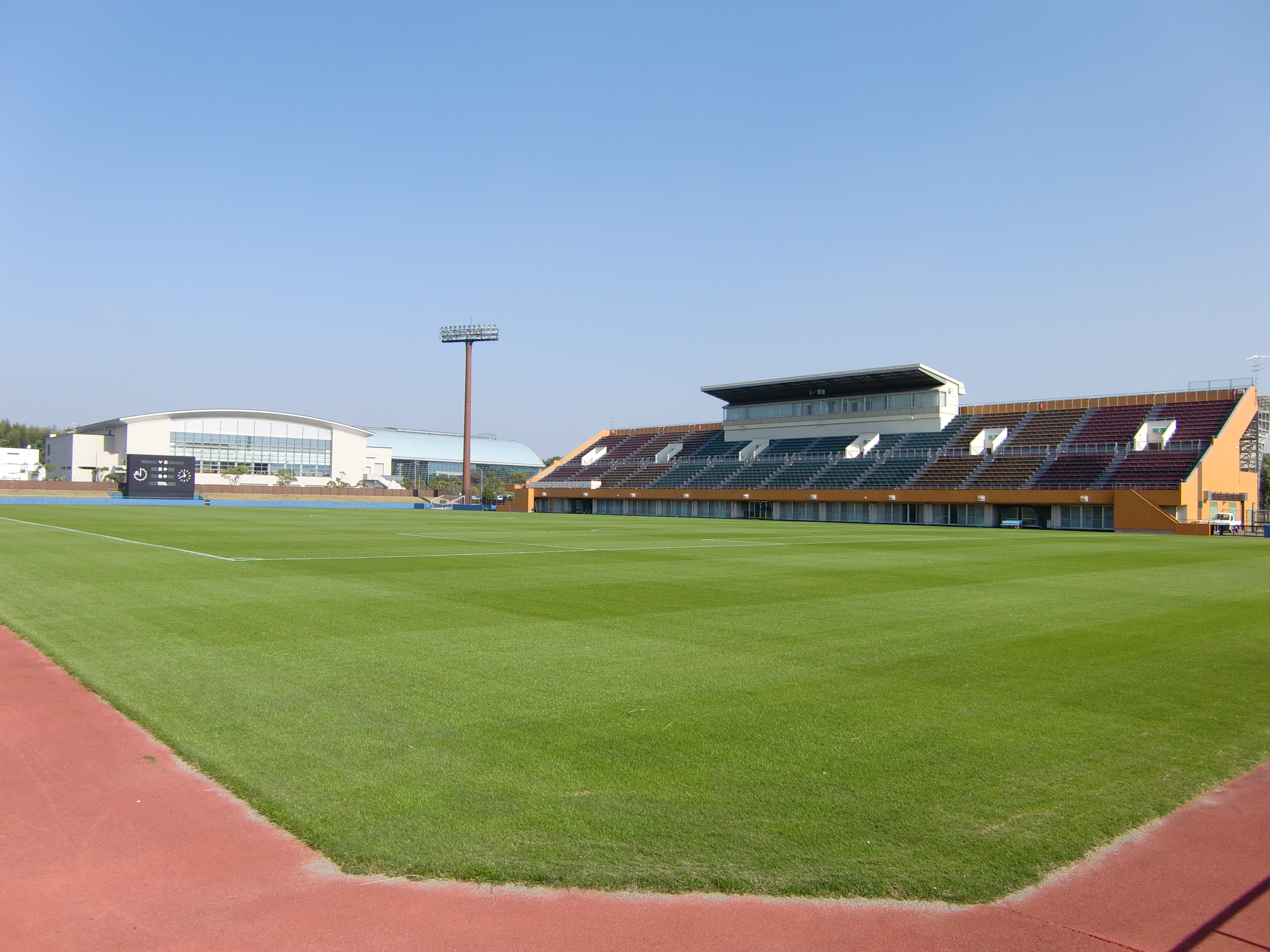
- Location: Suzuka, Mie, Japan
- Owner: Mie Prefecture
- Capacity: 12,000
- Opened: 1992

Tenants
- FC Suzuka Rampole, Veertien Mie

Mie Sports Garden (三重県営鈴鹿スポーツガーデン) is a Multi-purpose stadium and indoor/outdoor athletic complex in Suzuka, Mie, Japan. It was opened in 1992. It includes an indoor swimming pool, multiple gyms and climbing wall and multiple rugby/soccer fields. The main stadium is also the home of the Honda Heat who play in Japan Rugby League One and the Suzuka Point Getters of the Japan Football League. It has a capacity of 12,000.
