= 1991–92 Japan Soccer League =

The 1991–92 season in Japanese football was the last of the old Japan Soccer League before the transition period into the J.League.

== League tables ==
=== First Division ===
Japan Soccer League First Division
- Season: 1991–92
- Champions: Yomiuri SC; 5th title
- Relegated: Yamaha Motors; Toshiba; Hitachi; Honda
- Asian Club Championship: Yomiuri SC
- Asian Cup Winners' Cup: Nissan Motors SC
- Matches: 132
- Goals: 318 (2.41 per match)
- Top goalscorer: Toninho (18 goals)
- Average attendance: 6,707

Pos	Team	Pld	W	D	L	GF	GA	GD	Pts	Qualification
1	Yomiuri SC	22	15	6	1	43	13	+30	51	Form J.League and 1992–93 Asian Club Championship
2	Nissan Motors	22	12	7	3	25	14	+11	43	Form J.League and 1992–93 Asian Cup Winners' Cup (Note: By winning 1991 Emperor's Cup)
3	Yamaha Motors	22	11	3	8	30	31	−1	36	Form Japan Football League Division 1
4	Toshiba	22	7	9	6	26	24	+2	30	Form Japan Football League Division 1
5	Matsushita Electric	22	7	8	7	25	27	−2	29	Form J.League
6	Mazda	22	7	6	9	30	23	+7	27	Form J.League
7	JR Furukawa	22	8	3	11	30	38	−8	27	Form J.League
8	ANA Club	22	6	7	9	20	23	−3	25	Form J.League
9	Hitachi	22	6	7	9	22	30	−8	25	Form Japan Football League Division 1
10	Honda	22	5	8	9	18	25	−7	23	Form Japan Football League Division 1
11	Mitsubishi Motors	22	5	6	11	25	40	−15	21	Form J.League
12	Toyota Motors	22	4	8	10	24	30	−6	20	Form J.League

Source: RSSSF

==== Topscorers ====
Rank	Player	Goals
1	(Brazil) Toninho (Yomiuri Club)	18
2	(Japan) Masashi Nakayama (Yamaha Motor)	15
3	(Uruguay) Pedro Pedrucci (Toshiba)	12
4	(Japan) Takuya Takagi (Mazda)	9

=== Second Division ===
Pos	Team	Pld	W	D	L	GF	GA	GD	Pts	Qualification
1	Fujita Engineering	30	24	2	4	79	17	+62	74	Champions (not promoted, form Japan Football League Division 1)
2	Sumitomo	30	21	2	7	66	24	+42	65	Promoted to new J.League
3	Yanmar Diesel	30	20	5	5	56	17	+39	65	Form Japan Football League Division 1
4	Nippon Kokan	30	18	6	6	51	24	+27	60	Form Japan Football League Division 1
5	Fujitsu	30	17	8	5	46	26	+20	59	Form Japan Football League Division 1
6	Otsuka Pharmaceutical	30	15	5	10	45	32	+13	50	Form Japan Football League Division 1
7	Tokyo Gas	30	12	10	8	30	28	+2	46	Form Japan Football League Division 1
8	Kawasaki Steel	30	12	9	9	31	23	+8	45	Form Japan Football League Division 2
9	NTT Kanto	30	9	6	15	37	44	−7	33	Form Japan Football League Division 2
10	Kofu Club	30	9	6	15	35	66	−31	33	Form Japan Football League Division 2
11	Cosmo Oil Yokkaichi	30	8	5	17	27	53	−26	29	Form Japan Football League Division 2
12	Chuo Bohan	30	7	6	17	33	52	−19	27	Form Japan Football League Division 2
13	Toho Titanium	30	7	6	17	32	59	−27	27	Form Japan Football League Division 2
14	Kyoto Shiko Club	30	5	7	18	21	57	−36	22	Form Japan Football League Division 2
15	Tanabe Pharmaceutical	30	6	3	21	18	50	−32	21	Form Japan Football League Division 2
16	Yomiuri SC Juniors	30	5	4	21	20	55	−35	19	Folded (Note: Merges with parent club to form Verdy Kawasaki)

Source: RSSSF

== Successor seasons ==
- 1992 Japan Football League
- 1993 J.League
