= 1994 Urawa Red Diamonds season =

Urawa Red Diamonds
1994 season
- Manager: Kenzō Yokoyama
- Stadium: Urawa Komaba Stadium
- J.League: 12th
- Emperor's Cup: Quarterfinals
- J.League Cup: Quarterfinals
- Top goalscorer: League: Rummenigge (11); All: Rummenigge (12)
- Highest home attendance: 9,822 (vs Yokohama Marinos, 15 June 1994); 55,125 (vs Verdy Kawasaki, 17 September 1994, Tokyo National Stadium)
- Lowest home attendance: 7,854 (vs Sanfrecce Hiroshima, 23 March 1994)
- Average home league attendance: 18,475
Home colours	Away colours

1994 Urawa Red Diamonds season

== Review and events ==
=== League results summary ===
Overall								Home						Away					
Pld	W	D	L	GF	GA	GD	Pts	W	D	L	GF	GA	GD	W	D	L	GF	GA	GD
44	14	0	30	59	94	−35	42	10	0	12	31	38	−7	4	0	18	28	56	−28

Source: J.LEAGUE OFFICIAL 1995 RECORD & DATA. ISBN 4-09-102317-7.

=== League results by round ===
J.League Suntory series (first stage)
Round	1	2	3	4	5	6	7	8	9	10	11	12	13	14	15	16	17	18	19	20	21	22
Ground	A	H	A	H	A	H	A	A	H	A	H	A	H	A	H	A	H	H	A	H	A	H
Result	L	L	L	L	L	W	L	L	W	L	L	L	L	L	L	W	W	L	W	L	L	W
Position	9	11	11	11	12	12	12	12	11	12	12	12	12	12	12	12	12	12	12	12	12	12

Source: J.LEAGUE OFFICIAL 1995 RECORD & DATA. ISBN 4-09-102317-7.
A = Away; H = Home; W = Win; D = Draw; L = Loss

J.League NICOS series (second stage)
Round	1	2	3	4	5	6	7	8	9	10	11	12	13	14	15	16	17	18	19	20	21	22
Ground	A	H	A	H	A	H	A	A	H	A	H	A	H	A	H	A	H	H	A	H	A	H
Result	L	W	W	L	L	W	W	L	L	L	L	L	W	L	W	L	W	W	L	L	L	L
Position	10	7	5	5	8	7	5	6	9	10	11	11	10	11	10	11	9	8	9	10	11	11

Source: J.LEAGUE OFFICIAL 1995 RECORD & DATA. ISBN 4-09-102317-7.
A = Away; H = Home; W = Win; D = Draw; L = Loss

== Competitions ==
Competitions	Position
J.League	12th / 12 clubs
Emperor's Cup	Quarterfinals
J.League Cup	Quarterfinals

== Domestic results ==
=== J.League ===
==== Suntory series ====
12 March 1994 1st-1	Yokohama Marinos	2–0	Urawa Red Diamonds	Yokohama Mitsuzawa Football Stadium
15:02 JST (UTC+09)	Medina Bello 53'; Noda 89'	J. League		Attendance: 13,991; Referee: Shizuo Takada; Assistant referees: Hitoshi Yamada, Takeshi Ōkura; Fourth official: Susumu Takeda

16 March 1994 1st-2	Urawa Red Diamonds	0–2	Shimizu S-Pulse	Urawa Komaba Stadium
19:00 JST (UTC+09)		J. League	Sawanobori 14'; Hasegawa 21'	Attendance: 9,290; Referee: Masahiro Sogawa; Assistant referees: Toshiyuki Mayuzumi, Kazuaki Hamaguchi; Fourth official: Izumi Okada

19 March 1994 1st-3	JEF United Ichihara	3–2	Urawa Red Diamonds	Ichihara Stadium
15:01 JST (UTC+09)	Littbarski 22'; Jō 87'; Echigo 89'	J. League	Mizuuchi 28'; Hori 69'	Attendance: 9,837; Referee: Tetsuya Hamana; Assistant referees: Mitsuru Satō, Kazuhisa Osada; Fourth official: Yoshihiko Nishimaki

23 March 1994 1st-4	Urawa Red Diamonds	0–1	Sanfrecce Hiroshima	Urawa Komaba Stadium
19:02 JST (UTC+09)		J. League	Noh 27'	Attendance: 7,854; Referee: Shizuo Takada; Assistant referees: Hitoshi Yamada, Toshiyuki Mayuzumi; Fourth official: Masahisa Kajiwara

26 March 1994 1st-5	Nagoya Grampus Eight	7–2	Urawa Red Diamonds	Nagoya Mizuho Football Stadium
15:03 JST (UTC+09)	Fujikawa 16'; Moriyama 39', 43'; Jorginho 64' (pen.), 79'; Elivélton 73', 78'	J. League	4' (o.g.); Okano 70'	Attendance: 11,488; Referee: Masayoshi Okada; Assistant referees: Yasushi Tsuchimoto, Kazuya Yanagisawa; Fourth official: Yūji Kōda

2 April 1994 1st-6	Urawa Red Diamonds	2–1	Gamba Osaka	Urawa Komaba Stadium
15:01 JST (UTC+09)	Okano 20'; Fukuda 40'	J. League	Protassov 59'	Attendance: 9,157; Referee: Tatsumi Ōno; Assistant referees: Takeshi Ōkura, Kazuaki Hamaguchi; Fourth official: Keiji Kamiara; Man of the Match: Masayuki Okano

6 April 1994 1st-7	Yokohama Flügels	2–1 (V-goal) (a.e.t.)	Urawa Red Diamonds	Kagoshima Kamoike Stadium
19:03 JST (UTC+09)	Amarilla 22' 107'	J. League	Mochizuki 10'	Attendance: 10,130; Referee: Shizuo Takada; Assistant referees: Toshiyuki Mayuzumi, Hideaki Harada; Fourth official: Shōji Hamada

9 April 1994 1st-8	Júbilo Iwata	1–0 (V-goal) (a.e.t.)	Urawa Red Diamonds	Júbilo Iwata Stadium
14:00 JST (UTC+09)	Paus 90'	J. League		Attendance: 13,842; Referee: Hiroyuki Umemoto; Assistant referees: Kazunori Ōtoshi, Yasushi Tsuchimoto; Fourth official: Tōru Nagata

13 April 1994 1st-9	Urawa Red Diamonds	4–1	Bellmare Hiratsuka	Urawa Komaba Stadium
19:02 JST (UTC+09)	Fukuda 6' (pen.), 42' (pen.), 48', 82'	J. League	Betinho 40' (pen.)	Attendance: 9,408; Referee: Fumikazu Shioyazono; Assistant referees: Mitsuru Satō, Toshiyuki Mayuzumi; Fourth official: Satoru Tanigawa; Man of the Match: Masahiro Fukuda

16 April 1994 1st-10	Kashima Antlers	4–2	Urawa Red Diamonds	Kashima Soccer Stadium
15:01 JST (UTC+09)	Kurosaki 10'; Hasegawa 61'; Alcindo 66' (pen.), 85' (pen.)	J. League	Fukuda 82'; N. Ikeda 89'	Attendance: 14,057; Referee: Hideo Kikuchi; Assistant referees: Kazuaki Hamaguchi, Takashi Kunori; Fourth official: Ichirō Inukai

23 April 1994 1st-11	Urawa Red Diamonds	0–1 (V-goal) (a.e.t.)	Verdy Kawasaki	Tokyo National Stadium
19:03 JST (UTC+09)		J. League	Miura 98'	Attendance: 52,028; Referee: Kiyoshi Ōta; Assistant referees: Toshiyuki Mayuzumi, Tetsu Karakida; Fourth official: Izumi Okada

27 April 1994 1st-12	Shimizu S-Pulse	2–1 (V-goal) (a.e.t.)	Urawa Red Diamonds	Kusanagi Athletic Stadium
19:01 JST (UTC+09)	Nagashima 48'; Sawanobori 119'	J. League	Y. Satō 22'	Attendance: 17,789; Referee: Hideo Kikuchi; Assistant referees: Yasushi Tsuchimoto, Naoyuki Mori; Fourth official: Teruhito Kudō

30 April 1994 1st-13	Urawa Red Diamonds	0–2	JEF United Ichihara	Urawa Komaba Stadium
15:01 JST (UTC+09)		J. League	Otze 72'; Jō 87'	Attendance: 9,393; Referee: Kiyoshi Ōta; Assistant referees: Toshiyuki Mayuzumi, Masahiro Katagiri; Fourth official: Akio Hayashi

4 May 1994 1st-14	Sanfrecce Hiroshima	1–0	Urawa Red Diamonds	Hiroshima Big Arch
18:33 JST (UTC+09)	Hašek 89'	J. League		Attendance: 21,077; Referee: Kenji Tanaka; Assistant referees: Yoshikazu Hiroshima, Hideaki Harada; Fourth official: Kōji Ueno

7 May 1994 1st-15	Urawa Red Diamonds	0–1	Nagoya Grampus Eight	Tokyo National Stadium
18:30 JST (UTC+09)		J. League	Elivélton 61'	Attendance: 52,440; Referee: Yōtarō Moritsu; Assistant referees: Hitoshi Yamada, Mitsuru Satō; Fourth official: Keiji Kamiara

14 May 1994 1st-16	Gamba Osaka	1–2	Urawa Red Diamonds	Kobe Universiade Memorial Stadium
19:01 JST (UTC+09)	Karashima 55'	J. League	Rummenigge 65' (pen.); Mizuuchi 84'	Attendance: 37,292; Referee: Kiichirō Tachi; Assistant referees: Morihisa Yamaguchi, Sōichirō Kaneko; Fourth official: Keiji Hayashi; Man of the Match: Hisashi Tsuchida

18 May 1994 1st-17	Urawa Red Diamonds	3–0	Yokohama Flügels	Tokyo National Stadium
19:02 JST (UTC+09)	Y. Satō 32'; Asano 54'; N. Ikeda 66'	J. League		Attendance: 48,466; Referee: Tetsuya Hamana; Assistant referees: Kazuaki Hamaguchi, Kenichi Koshiyama; Fourth official: Ichirō Kuwabara; Man of the Match: Nobuyasu Ikeda

1 June 1994 1st-18	Urawa Red Diamonds	0–1	Júbilo Iwata	Urawa Komaba Stadium
19:00 JST (UTC+09)		J. League	Yonezawa 89'	Attendance: 9,408; Referee: Zoran Petrović; Assistant referees: Takashi Kunori, Toshiyuki Mayuzumi; Fourth official: Keiji Kamiara

4 June 1994 1st-19	Bellmare Hiratsuka	2–4	Urawa Red Diamonds	Hiratsuka Stadium
15:00 JST (UTC+09)	Watanabe 16'; Betinho 38' (pen.)	J. League	Y. Satō 9', 69'; Lulu 46'; N. Ikeda 65'	Attendance: 14,832; Referee: Kenji Tanaka; Assistant referees: Hitoshi Yamada, Kenichi Koshiyama; Fourth official: Akio Dobashi; Man of the Match: Masayuki Okano

8 June 1994 1st-20	Urawa Red Diamonds	1–4	Kashima Antlers	Urawa Komaba Stadium
19:01 JST (UTC+09)	Rummenigge 77' (pen.)	J. League	Hasegawa 13'; Alcindo 51', 56' (pen.); Zico 78'	Attendance: 9,674; Referee: Zoran Petrović; Assistant referees: Mitsuru Satō, Toshiyuki Mayuzumi; Fourth official: Masahisa Kajiwara

11 June 1994 1st-21	Verdy Kawasaki	3–0	Urawa Red Diamonds	Kawasaki Todoroki Stadium
19:03 JST (UTC+09)	Miura 32'; Takeda 42', 54'	J. League		Attendance: 10,597; Referee: Fumikazu Shioyazono; Assistant referees: Hitoshi Yamada, Hiroshi Fukuda; Fourth official: T. Katō (加藤 恒夫)

15 June 1994 1st-22	Urawa Red Diamonds	2–1 (V-goal) (a.e.t.)	Yokohama Marinos	Urawa Komaba Stadium
19:02 JST (UTC+09)	Hirose 25'; Asano 108'	J. League	Noda 67'	Attendance: 9,822; Referee: Kiyoshi Ōta; Assistant referees: Kimio Izaki, Satoru Ishizawa; Fourth official: Izumi Okada; Man of the Match: Osamu Hirose

==== NICOS series ====
10 August 1994 2nd-1	Yokohama Marinos	3–0	Urawa Red Diamonds	Yokohama Mitsuzawa Football Stadium
19:01 JST (UTC+09)	Miura 48'; Medina Bello 65', 74'	J. League		Attendance: 13,639; Referee: Hideo Kikuchi; Assistant referees: Yū Nakamura, Yasushi Tsuchimoto; Fourth official: Noriyuki Sasaki

13 August 1994 2nd-2	Urawa Red Diamonds	2–0	Shimizu S-Pulse	Omiya Football Stadium
18:30 JST (UTC+09)	Rummenigge 75'; Y. Satō 83'	J. League		Attendance: 9,488; Referee: Fumikazu Shioyazono; Assistant referees: Hitoshi Yamada, Takeshi Ōkura; Fourth official: Akio Hayashi; Man of the Match: Buchwald

17 August 1994 2nd-3	JEF United Ichihara	3–4	Urawa Red Diamonds	Ichihara Stadium
19:02 JST (UTC+09)	Maslovar 17'; Jō 61'; Echigo 85'	J. League	Rummenigge 29', 58'; Y. Satō 63', 87'	Attendance: 10,502; Referee: Kiichirō Tachi; Assistant referees: Yū Nakamura, Toshiyuki Mayuzumi; Fourth official: Yoshitoshi Watanabe; Man of the Match: Rummenigge

20 August 1994 2nd-4	Urawa Red Diamonds	0–2	Sanfrecce Hiroshima	Omiya Football Stadium
18:30 JST (UTC+09)		J. League	Hašek 32'; Noh 83'	Attendance: 9,367; Referee: Kōetsu Kikuchi; Assistant referees: Yū Nakamura, Kimio Izaki; Fourth official: Masahisa Kajiwara

27 August 1994 2nd-5	Nagoya Grampus Eight	4–2	Urawa Red Diamonds	Gifu Nagaragawa Stadium
18:01 JST (UTC+09)	Moriyama 0', 84'; Binić 49', 69'	J. League	Lulu 15'; Y. Satō 74'	Attendance: 25,096; Referee: Zoran Petrović; Assistant referees: Yasuhiro Matsuzaki, Naoyuki Mori; Fourth official: Yasushi Tsuchimoto

31 August 1994 2nd-6	Urawa Red Diamonds	1–0	Gamba Osaka	Omiya Football Stadium
19:00 JST (UTC+09)	Lulu 5'	J. League		Attendance: 9,611; Referee: Hiroyuki Umemoto; Assistant referees: Kazuaki Hamaguchi, Toshiyuki Mayuzumi; Fourth official: Satoru Tanigawa; Man of the Match: Lulu

3 September 1994 2nd-7	Yokohama Flügels	0–1	Urawa Red Diamonds	Yokohama Mitsuzawa Football Stadium
15:30 JST (UTC+09)		J. League	Buchwald 89' (pen.)	Attendance: 14,083; Referee: Kenji Tanaka; Assistant referees: Kimio Izaki, Masahiro Katagiri; Fourth official: Haruo Suzuki; Man of the Match: Hisashi Tsuchida

7 September 1994 2nd-8	Júbilo Iwata	2–1	Urawa Red Diamonds	Júbilo Iwata Stadium
19:01 JST (UTC+09)	Fujita 63'; Vanenburg 84'	J. League	Rummenigge 25'	Attendance: 14,163; Referee: Masayoshi Okada; Assistant referees: Yoshimi Ogawa, Kazuhisa Osada; Fourth official: Toshiaki Futamata

10 September 1994 2nd-9	Urawa Red Diamonds	1–4	Bellmare Hiratsuka	Omiya Football Stadium
18:32 JST (UTC+09)	Rummenigge 80'	J. League	Edson 14'; Betinho 27', 43'; Narahashi 30'	Attendance: 9,230; Referee: Tetsuya Hamana; Assistant referees: Takeshi Ōkura, Kimio Izaki; Fourth official: Toshimitsu Yasumoto

14 September 1994 2nd-10	Kashima Antlers	2–0	Urawa Red Diamonds	Kashima Soccer Stadium
19:03 JST (UTC+09)	Leonardo 31' (pen.), 48'	J. League		Attendance: 15,661; Referee: Tatsumi Ōno; Assistant referees: Kazuaki Hamaguchi, Takashi Kunori; Fourth official: Ichirō Inukai

17 September 1994 2nd-11	Urawa Red Diamonds	1–3	Verdy Kawasaki	Tokyo National Stadium
18:32 JST (UTC+09)	Y. Satō 71'	J. League	Pereira 44', 47'; Bentinho 63'	Attendance: 55,125; Referee: Masayoshi Okada; Assistant referees: Hitoshi Yamada, Takeshi Ōkura; Fourth official: Keiji Kamiara

21 September 1994 2nd-12	Shimizu S-Pulse	5–4 (V-goal) (a.e.t.)	Urawa Red Diamonds	Kusanagi Athletic Stadium
19:02 JST (UTC+09)	Shirai 39'; Toninho 44', 74'; Djalminha 61' 97'	J. League	Lulu 12', 22', 80'; Rummenigge 16'	Attendance: 19,001; Referee: Yoshimi Ogawa; Assistant referees: Yoshikazu Hiroshima, Naoyuki Mori; Fourth official: Teruhito Kudō

19 October 1994 2nd-13	Urawa Red Diamonds	3–2 (V-goal) (a.e.t.)	JEF United Ichihara	Hakatanomori Athletic Stadium
19:03 JST (UTC+09)	Lulu 69'; 89' (o.g.); Rummenigge 102'	J. League	Shin 2'; Ordenewitz 64'	Attendance: 10,915; Referee: Shizuo Takada; Assistant referees: Sōichirō Kaneko, Tōru Yamashiro; Fourth official: Masatoshi Shibata; Man of the Match: Rummenigge

22 October 1994 2nd-14	Sanfrecce Hiroshima	1–0	Urawa Red Diamonds	Hiroshima Big Arch
18:35 JST (UTC+09)	Noh 31'	J. League		Attendance: 15,903; Referee: Zoran Petrović; Assistant referees: Yoshikazu Hiroshima, Mitsuo Kadota; Fourth official: Yutaka Miyake

26 October 1994 2nd-15	Urawa Red Diamonds	1–1 (V-goal) (a.e.t.) (4–3 p)	Nagoya Grampus Eight	Omiya Football Stadium
19:04 JST (UTC+09)	Nakashima 27'	J. League	Yonekura 83'	Attendance: 9,885; Referee: Alberto Tejada; Assistant referees: Kazuaki Hamaguchi, Kazuhisa Osada; Fourth official: Ichirō Kuwabara; Man of the Match: Hisashi Tsuchida
	Penalties
	(penalty missed) Fukuda; (penalty scored) Lulu; (penalty scored) S. Kikuhara; (penalty scored) Buchwald; (penalty scored) Asano		(penalty scored) Ogura; (penalty missed) Hirano; (penalty scored) Lineker; (penalty scored) Egawa; (penalty missed) Garça

29 October 1994 2nd-16	Gamba Osaka	4–1	Urawa Red Diamonds	Expo '70 Commemorative Stadium
19:04 JST (UTC+09)	Kitamura 0'; Matsunami 70'; Flavio 75'; Tsveiba 89'	J. League	Buchwald 80'	Attendance: 18,318; Referee: Hideo Kikuchi; Assistant referees: Hiroshi Tanabe, Naoki Esumi; Fourth official: Akio Okutani

2 November 1994 2nd-17	Urawa Red Diamonds	3–1	Yokohama Flügels	Omiya Football Stadium
19:01 JST (UTC+09)	Bein 4', 16'; Okano 83'	J. League	Aldro 6'	Attendance: 9,901; Referee: Rune Larsson; Assistant referees: Noboru Ishiyama, Kenichi Koshiyama; Fourth official: Noboru Shioi; Man of the Match: Bein

5 November 1994 2nd-18	Urawa Red Diamonds	2–0	Júbilo Iwata	Kobe Universiade Memorial Stadium
15:03 JST (UTC+09)	Lulu 30'; Hirose 80'	J. League		Attendance: 23,195; Referee: Yōtarō Moritsu; Assistant referees: Morihisa Yamaguchi, Kazuo Kakihana; Fourth official: Tsuneo Murakami; Man of the Match: Osamu Hirose

9 November 1994 2nd-19	Bellmare Hiratsuka	2–0	Urawa Red Diamonds	Hiratsuka Stadium
19:03 JST (UTC+09)	Betinho 57'; Almir 87'	J. League		Attendance: 15,013; Referee: Naotsugu Fuse; Assistant referees: Kazuaki Hamaguchi, Toshiyuki Mayuzumi; Fourth official: Masaki Yoshihara

12 November 1994 2nd-20	Urawa Red Diamonds	2–4	Kashima Antlers	Omiya Football Stadium
14:32 JST (UTC+09)	Hirose 18', 25'	J. League	Masuda 22'; Kurosaki 63'; Alcindo 84', 89'	Attendance: 9,962; Referee: Zoran Petrović; Assistant referees: Noboru Ishiyama, Satoru Ishizawa; Fourth official: Izumi Okada

16 November 1994 2nd-21	Verdy Kawasaki	2–1	Urawa Red Diamonds	Tokyo National Stadium
19:03 JST (UTC+09)	Takeda 30', 42'	J. League	Rummenigge 87'	Attendance: 52,480; Referee: Naotsugu Fuse; Assistant referees: Mitsuru Satō, Toshiyuki Mayuzumi; Fourth official: Kazuhiko Uchida

19 November 1994 2nd-22	Urawa Red Diamonds	3–6	Yokohama Marinos	Toyama Stadium
15:04 JST (UTC+09)	Rummenigge 18'; Taguchi 81'; Yamada 84'	J. League	Zapata 40'; Bisconti 45', 62'; Jinno 55'; Miura 68'; Omura 73'	Attendance: 22,838; Referee: Yōtarō Moritsu; Assistant referees: Kazuya Yanagisawa, Kōji Taniuchi; Fourth official: Kinji Sakō

=== Emperor's Cup ===
4 December 1994 1st Round	Senshu University	1–3	Urawa Red Diamonds	Omiya Football Stadium
12:01 JST (UTC+09)	Arai 37'		Mizuuchi 6'; Fukuda 70'; Asano 88'	Attendance: 11,551; Referee: Satoru Ishizawa

11 December 1994 2nd Round	Yokohama Flügels	0–2	Urawa Red Diamonds	Hiratsuka Stadium
14:01 JST (UTC+09)			Fukuda 6'; Mizuuchi 82'	Attendance: 15,180; Referee: Keiichi Sunakawa

18 December 1994 Quarterfinals	Urawa Red Diamonds	0–1 (a.e.t.)	Cerezo Osaka	Hakatanomori Athletic Stadium
13:01 JST (UTC+09)			Marquinhos 106' (pen.)	Attendance: 23,233; Referee: Kenji Tanaka

=== J.League Cup ===
27 July 1994 1st Round	Kashima Antlers	1–2	Urawa Red Diamonds	Kashima Soccer Stadium
18:59 JST (UTC+09)	Santos 60'	J. League	Rummenigge 56'; Mizuuchi 80'	Attendance: 16,078; Referee: Naotsugu Fuse; Assistant referees: Masahiro Katagiri, Masato Nogami; Fourth official: Atsushi Fujigasaki

30 July 1994 Quarterfinals	Gamba Osaka	3–0	Urawa Red Diamonds	Expo '70 Commemorative Stadium
19:00 JST (UTC+09)	Aleinikov 19'; Shimada 42'; Morioka 78'	J. League		Attendance: 20,556; Referee: Shinichirō Obata; Assistant referees: Morihisa Yamaguchi, Kazuo Kakihana; Fourth official: Akio Okutani

== Player statistics ==
No.	Pos	Nat	Player	Total		J-League		Emperor's Cup		J-League Cup	
No.	Pos	Nat	Player	Apps	Goals	Apps	Goals	Apps	Goals	Apps	Goals
	GK	(Slovakia) SVK	Miro	1	0	1	0	0	0	0	0
	GK	(Japan) JPN	Hisashi Tsuchida	48	0	43	0	3	0	2	0
	GK	(Japan) JPN	Yūki Takita	0	0	0	0	0	0	0	0
	GK	(Japan) JPN	Norio Takahashi	0	0	0	0	0	0	0	0
	GK	(Japan) JPN	Hiroki Aratani	0	0	0	0	0	0	0	0
	DF	(Japan) JPN	Kōichi Hashiratani	7	0	7	0	0	0	0	0
	DF	(Japan) JPN	Yoshinori Taguchi	33	1	29	1	2	0	2	0
	DF	(Japan) JPN	Takeshi Motoyoshi	4	0	4	0	0	0	0	0
	DF	(South Korea) KOR	Cho Ki-je (Note: His name is Cho Kwi-Jea. But his name is listed with Cho Kije on J.League official books in 1994. In J.League and domestic competitions, he was considered as a Japanese player.)	44	0	39	0	3	0	2	0
	DF	(Japan) JPN	Yukinori Muramatsu	2	0	1	0	0	0	1	0
	DF	(Japan) JPN	Futoshi Ikeda	30	0	27	0	1	0	2	0
	DF	(Japan) JPN	Makoto Yamazaki	0	0	0	0	0	0	0	0
	DF	(Japan) JPN	Tsutomu Nishino	0	0	0	0	0	0	0	0
	DF	(Japan) JPN	Yūta Nakazawa	1	0	0	0	1	0	0	0
	DF	(Japan) JPN	Kiyonobu Okajima	8	0	8	0	0	0	0	0
	DF	(Japan) JPN	Hiroyuki Sawada	0	0	0	0	0	0	0	0
	DF	(Japan) JPN	Yoshinori Matsuda	0	0	0	0	0	0	0	0
	DF	(Japan) JPN	Tomo Satō	0	0	0	0	0	0	0	0
	DF	(Japan) JPN	Kenji Sakaguchi	0	0	0	0	0	0	0	0
	DF	(Japan) JPN	Naohiko Noro	0	0	0	0	0	0	0	0
	DF	(Japan) JPN	Ken Iwase	0	0	0	0	0	0	0	0
	MF	(Japan) JPN	Atsushi Natori	3	0	3	0	0	0	0	0
	MF	(Germany) GER	Rummenigge	29	12	27	11	0	0	2	1
	MF	(Japan) JPN	Satoru Mochizuki	8	1	6	1	2	0	0	0
	MF	(Japan) JPN	Osamu Hirose	20	4	18	4	0	0	2	0
	MF	(Japan) JPN	Takafumi Hori	43	1	41	1	0	0	2	0
	MF	(Japan) JPN	Akinori Mikami	5	0	5	0	0	0	0	0
	MF	(Japan) JPN	Shirō Kikuhara	11	0	8	0	3	0	0	0
	MF	(Peru) PER	Edwin Uehara (Note: He was naturalized in Japan on 23 May 1994.)	4	0	4	0	0	0	0	0
	MF	(Japan) JPN	Nobuyuki Hosaka	17	0	17	0	0	0	0	0
	MF	(Japan) JPN	Hideki Kanō	0	0	0	0	0	0	0	0
	MF	(Japan) JPN	Kōichi Nakazato	0	0	0	0	0	0	0	0
	MF	(Japan) JPN	Yasunori Tsukao	0	0	0	0	0	0	0	0
	MF	(Japan) JPN	Naoto Sakurai	0	0	0	0	0	0	0	0
	MF	(Japan) JPN	Nobuhisa Yamada	18	1	15	1	3	0	0	0
	MF	(Japan) JPN	Hideto Saitō	0	0	0	0	0	0	0	0
	FW	(Germany) GER	Rahn	0	0	0	0	0	0	0	0
	FW	(Japan) JPN	Masahiro Fukuda	28	8	25	6	3	2	0	0
	FW	(Slovakia) SVK	Lulu	16	8	16	8	0	0	0	0
	FW	(Japan) JPN	Hiroshi Ninomiya	0	0	0	0	0	0	0	0
	FW	(Japan) JPN	Yoshiaki Satō	29	9	27	9	2	0	0	0
	FW	(Japan) JPN	Shinichi Kawano	0	0	0	0	0	0	0	0
	FW	(Japan) JPN	Nobuyasu Ikeda	27	3	27	3	0	0	0	0
	FW	(Japan) JPN	Kōichi Sugiyama	35	0	31	0	3	0	1	0
	FW	(Japan) JPN	Masayuki Okano	40	3	35	3	3	0	2	0
	FW	(Japan) JPN	Hideyuki Imakura	0	0	0	0	0	0	0	0
	FW	(Japan) JPN	Takeshi Mizuuchi	25	5	20	2	3	2	2	1
	FW	(Japan) JPN	Noriaki Shimura	0	0	0	0	0	0	0	0
	FW	(Japan) JPN	Yūichi Sonoda	0	0	0	0	0	0	0	0
	FW	(Japan) JPN	Masahiro Sukigara †	1	0	1	0	0	0	0	0
	MF	(Japan) JPN	Nobuo Kikuhara †	0	0	0	0	0	0	0	0
	MF	(Japan) JPN	Tetsuya Asano †	34	3	29	2	3	1	2	0
	MF	(Germany) GER	Bein †	12	2	10	2	0	0	2	0
	DF	(Germany) GER	Buchwald †	25	2	20	2	3	0	2	0
	GK	(Japan) JPN	Akihisa Sonobe †	0	0	0	0	0	0	0	0
	DF	(Japan) JPN	Takeshi Nakashima †	8	1	8	1	0	0	0	0

- † player(s) joined the team after the opening of this season.

== Transfers ==
In:

No.	Pos.	Nation	Player
—	DF	JPN	Kiyonobu Okajima (from Chuo University)
—	DF	JPN	Yoshinori Taguchi (from Sanfrecce Hiroshima)
—	DF	KOR	Cho Ki-je (from Kashiwa Reysol)
—	MF	JPN	Hideki Kanō (from National Institute of Fitness and Sports in Kanoya)
—	MF	JPN	Nobuyuki Hosaka (from Verdy Kawasaki)
—	MF	JPN	Shirō Kikuhara (loan from Verdy Kawasaki)
—	DF	JPN	Naohiko Noro (from Yokkaichi Chuo Technical High School)
—	DF	JPN	Ken Iwase (from Narashino High School)
—	MF	JPN	Naoto Sakurai (from Omiya Higashi High School)
—	MF	JPN	Nobuhisa Yamada (from Fujieda Higashi High School)
—	MF	JPN	Hideto Saitō (from Fukaya High School)
—	FW	SVK	Lulu (from Inter Bratislava)
—	FW	JPN	Yoshiaki Satō (from Gamba Osaka)
—	FW	JPN	Kōichi Sugiyama (from Osaka University of Commerce)
—	FW	JPN	Masayuki Okano (from Nihon University)
—	DF	JPN	Yūta Nakazawa (from Hosei University)
—	FW	JPN	Yūichi Sonoda (from Chukyo High School)
—	GK	JPN	Hiroki Aratani (from Toyama Daiichi High school)

Out:

No.	Pos.	Nation	Player
—	GK	JPN	Akihisa Sonobe (retired)
—	GK	JPN	Motohiro Takamura (retired)
—	DF	JPN	Shinji Tanaka (to Kyoto Purple Sanga)
—	DF	ARG	Trivisonno
—	MF	JPN	Seiichi Makita (to Fujitsu)
—	MF	JPN	Eiji Satō (Fukushima FC)
—	MF	JPN	Hiromichi Satō (retired)
—	MF	JPN	Yasuki Hashimoto (Chuo Bohan)
—	FW	JPN	Tsuyoshi Kino (retired)
—	FW	JPN	Yoshimasa Suda (Kofu soccer club)
—	FW	JPN	Yasushi Matsumoto (to Fukuoka Blux)
—	FW	JPN	Masato Suzuki (retired)
—	FW	JPN	Ichirō Sugiura (retired)

== Transfers during the season ==
=== In ===
- (Japan) Masahiro Sukigara (from Verdy Kawasaki on March)
- (Japan) Nobuo Kikuhara (from University of Tsukuba on March)
- (Japan) Tetsuya Asano (loan from Nagoya Grampus Eight on April)
- (Germany) Uwe Bein (from Eintracht Frankfurt on July)
- (Germany) Guido Buchwald (from VfB Stuttgart on July)
- (Japan) Akihisa Sonobe (from Urawa Red Diamonds GK coach)
- (Japan) Takeshi Nakashima (from Waseda University on September)

=== Out ===
- (Japan) Kōichi Hashiratani (to Kashiwa Reysol on June)
- (Slovakia) Miro (on September)

== Awards ==
none

== Other pages ==
- (in Japanese) J. League official site
- (in Japanese) Urawa Red Diamonds official site
