= Takeshi Mizuuchi =

Japanese footballer

Takeshi Mizuuchi 水内 猛
Personal information
- Full name: Takeshi Mizuuchi
- Date of birth: November 19, 1972 (age 53)
- Place of birth: Kanagawa, Japan
- Height: 1.70 m (5 ft 7 in)
- Position: Forward

Youth career
- 1988–1990: Asahi High School

Senior career*
Years	Team	Apps	(Gls)
1991–1995	Urawa Reds	50	(10)
1996–1997	Brummell Sendai	43	(18)
Total		93	(28)
- * Club domestic league appearances and goals

Takeshi Mizuuchi (水内 猛, Mizuuchi Takeshi; born November 19, 1972) is a former Japanese football player.

== Playing career ==
Mizuuchi was born in Kanagawa Prefecture on November 19, 1972. After graduating from high school, he joined Mitsubishi Motors (later Urawa Reds) in 1991. Although initially he could hardly play in the match, he played many matches instead Masahiro Fukuda and Koichi Hashiratani who got hurt. He moved to Japan Football League club Brummell Sendai in 1996. He retired end of 1997 season.

== Club statistics ==
Club performance			League		Cup		League Cup		Total	
Season	Club	League	Apps	Goals	Apps	Goals	Apps	Goals	Apps	Goals
Japan			League		Emperor's Cup		J.League Cup		Total	
1990/91	Mitsubishi Motors	JSL Division 1	1	0	0	0	0	0	1	0
1991/92	Mitsubishi Motors	JSL Division 1	1	0	0	0	0	0	1	0
1992	Urawa Reds	J1 League	-		0	0	0	0	0	0
1993	Urawa Reds	J1 League	18	7	2	3	4	1	24	11
1994	Urawa Reds	J1 League	20	2	3	2	2	1	25	5
1995	Urawa Reds	J1 League	10	1	0	0	-		10	1
1996	Brummell Sendai	Football League	21	15	3	3	-		24	18
1997	Brummell Sendai	Football League	22	3	2	3	3	0	27	6
Total			93	28	10	11	9	2	112	41
