= Makoto Yamazaki =

Japanese footballer and manager

Makoto Yamazaki 山崎 真
Personal information
- Full name: Makoto Yamazaki
- Date of birth: October 31, 1970 (age 56)
- Place of birth: Kagoshima, Japan
- Height: 1.72 m (5 ft 7 1/2 in)
- Positions: Midfielder; defender

Youth career
- 1986–1988: Okuchi High School
- 1989–1992: National Institute of Fitness and Sports in Kanoya

Senior career*
Years	Team	Apps	(Gls)
1993–1994	Urawa Reds	6	(0)
1995	Tokyo Gas	19	(4)
1996–1997	Mito HollyHock	16	(2)
Total		41	(6)

Managerial career
- 2018–: Albirex Niigata Ladies
- * Club domestic league appearances and goals

Makoto Yamazaki (山崎 真, Yamazaki Makoto; born October 31, 1970) is a former Japanese football player and manager.

== Playing career ==
Yamazaki was born in Kagoshima Prefecture on October 31, 1970. After graduating from National Institute of Fitness and Sports in Kanoya, he joined Urawa Reds in 1993. Although he played several matches as left side back in first season, he could not play at all in the match behind newcomer Koichi Sugiyama in 1994. In 1995, he moved to Japan Football League (JFL) club Tokyo Gas and played many matches. In 1996, he moved to Regional Leagues club Prima Ham Tsuchiura (later Mito HollyHock). Although he could hardly play in the match in 1996, the club was promoted to JFL. In 1997, he played many matches as midfielder and he retired end of 1997 season.

== Coaching career ==
After retirement, Yamazaki started coaching career at Oita Trinita in 1998. From 1999, he worked at many club, FC Tokyo (1999-02), Montedio Yamagata (2003–06), Albirex Niigata (2008), Sanfrecce Hiroshima (2009–12) and Nagoya Grampus (2016–17). He mainly coached youth team these clubs. In 2018, he signed with L.League club Albirex Niigata Ladies and became a manager.

== Club statistics ==
Club performance			League		Cup		League Cup		Total	
Season	Club	League	Apps	Goals	Apps	Goals	Apps	Goals	Apps	Goals
Japan			League		Emperor's Cup		J.League Cup		Total	
1993	Urawa Reds	J1 League	6	0	2	0	4	0	12	0
1994	Urawa Reds	J1 League	0	0	0	0	0	0	0	0
1995	Tokyo Gas	Football League	19	4	1	0	-		20	4
1996	Prima Ham Tsuchiura	Regional Leagues	0	0	1	0	-		1	0
1997	Mito HollyHock	Football League	16	2	0	0	-		16	2
Total			41	6	4	0	4	0	49	6
