= Eiji Sato =

Japanese footballer

Eiji Sato 佐藤 英二
Personal information
- Full name: Eiji Sato
- Date of birth: April 8, 1971 (age 55)
- Place of birth: Tokyo, Japan
- Height: 1.65 m (5 ft 5 in)
- Position: Midfielder

Senior career*
Years	Team	Apps	(Gls)
1990–1993	Urawa Reds	26	(1)
1995	Fukushima FC	23	(1)
1996–2002	Sony Sendai	97	(4)
Total		146	(6)

Managerial career
- 2004–2007: Sony Sendai
- * Club domestic league appearances and goals

Eiji Sato (佐藤 英二, Satō Eiji; born April 8, 1971) is a former Japanese football player and manager.

== Playing career ==
Sato was born in Tokyo on April 8, 1971. He joined Mitsubishi Motors (later Urawa Reds) in 1990. Although he played many matches in first season, his opportunity to play decreased and he left the club in 1993. In 1995, he joined Japan Football League club Fukushima FC. In 1996, he moved to Regional Leagues club Sony Sendai and played for the club until 2002.

== Coaching career ==
Sato started coaching career at Sony Sendai in 2003. In 2004, he became a manager for the club and managed until 2007.

== Club statistics ==
Club performance			League		Cup		League Cup		Total	
Season	Club	League	Apps	Goals	Apps	Goals	Apps	Goals	Apps	Goals
Japan			League		Emperor's Cup		J.League Cup		Total	
1990/91	Mitsubishi Motors	JSL Division 1	13	0			0	0	13	0
1991/92	Mitsubishi Motors	JSL Division 1	5	1			0	0	5	1
1992	Urawa Reds	J1 League	-		2	0	2	0	4	0
1993	Urawa Reds	J1 League	8	0	0	0	0	0	8	0
1995	Fukushima FC	Football League	23	1	0	0	-		23	1
1996	Sony Sendai	Regional Leagues	0	0	2	0	-		2	0
1997	Sony Sendai	Regional Leagues	0	0	0	0	-		0	0
1998	Sony Sendai	Football League	21	0	2	0	-		23	0
1999	Sony Sendai	Football League	24	2	3	0	-		27	2
2000	Sony Sendai	Football League	17	0	1	0	-		18	0
2001	Sony Sendai	Football League	23	2	1	0	-		24	2
2002	Sony Sendai	Football League	12	0	1	0	-		13	0
Total			146	6	12	0	2	0	160	6
