= Trivisonno =

Trivisonno is a surname. Notable people with the surname include:

- Marcelo Trivisonno (born 1966), Argentine footballer
- Mike Trivisonno (1947–2021), American radio broadcaster
