= 1993 Urawa Red Diamonds season =

Urawa Red Diamonds
1993 season
- Manager: Takaji Mori
- Stadium: Urawa Komaba Stadium
- J.League: 10th
- Emperor's Cup: 2nd Round
- J.League Cup: GL-B 6th
- Top goalscorer: League: Takeshi Mizuuchi (7); All: Takeshi Mizuuchi (11)
- Highest home attendance: 9,771 (vs Verdy Kawasaki, 3 September 1993); 50,348 (vs Shimizu S-Pulse, 27 November 1993, Tokyo National Stadium)
- Lowest home attendance: 8,258 (vs Sanfrecce Hiroshima, 10 November 1993)
- Average home league attendance: 11,459
Home colours	Away colours

1993 Urawa Red Diamonds season

== Review and events ==
=== League results summary ===
Overall								Home						Away					
Pld	W	D	L	GF	GA	GD	Pts	W	D	L	GF	GA	GD	W	D	L	GF	GA	GD
36	8	0	28	26	78	−52	24	6	0	12	14	36	−22	2	0	16	12	42	−30

Source: J.LEAGUE OFFICIAL RECORD & DATA 1994. ISBN 4-09-102309-6.

=== League results by round ===
J.League Suntory series (first stage)
Round	1	2	3	4	5	6	7	8	9	10	11	12	13	14	15	16	17	18
Ground	A	H	A	A	H	H	A	A	H	A	H	H	A	A	H	H	A	H
Result	L	L	L	L	W	L	L	L	W	L	L	L	L	L	W	L	L	L
Position	9	10	10	10	9	10	10	10	10	10	10	10	10	10	10	10	10	10

Source: J.LEAGUE OFFICIAL RECORD & DATA 1994. ISBN 4-09-102309-6.
A = Away; H = Home; W = Win; D = Draw; L = Loss

J.League NICOS series (second stage)
Round	1	2	3	4	5	6	7	8	9	10	11	12	13	14	15	16	17	18
Ground	A	H	A	A	H	H	A	A	H	A	H	H	A	A	H	H	A	H
Result	L	W	W	L	L	L	L	L	L	L	L	L	W	L	L	W	L	W
Position	10	8	6	7	9	9	9	9	10	10	10	10	10	10	10	10	10	10

Source: J.LEAGUE OFFICIAL RECORD & DATA 1994. ISBN 4-09-102309-6.
A = Away; H = Home; W = Win; D = Draw; L = Loss

== Competitions ==
Competitions	Position
J.League	10th / 10 clubs
Emperor's Cup	2nd round
J.League Cup	GL-B 6th / 6 clubs

== Domestic results ==
=== J.League ===
==== Suntory series ====
16 May 1993 1st-1	Gamba Osaka	1–0	Urawa Red Diamonds	Expo '70 Commemorative Stadium
19:04 JST (UTC+09)	Wada 29'	J. League		Attendance: 19,580; Referee: Kenji Tanaka; Assistant referees: Kazuo Kakihana, Yoshitsugu Katayama; Fourth official: Sōichirō Kaneko

19 May 1993 1st-2	Urawa Red Diamonds	0–3	Nagoya Grampus Eight	Urawa Komaba Stadium
19:00 JST (UTC+09)		J. League	Moriyama 34', 48'; Gotō 85'	Attendance: 9,259; Referee: Tetsuya Hamana; Assistant referees: Mitsuru Satō, Toshiyuki Mayuzumi; Fourth official: Morihiko Yamaji

22 May 1993 1st-3	Yokohama Flügels	3–1	Urawa Red Diamonds	Yokohama Mitsuzawa Football Stadium
18:35 JST (UTC+09)	Takada 27'; Maeda 44', 59'	J. League	Mochizuki 72'	Attendance: 7,469; Referee: Kōetsu Kikuchi; Assistant referees: Yū Nakamura, Noboru Ishiyama; Fourth official: Takashi Aoki

26 May 1993 1st-4	JEF United Ichihara	1–0	Urawa Red Diamonds	Tokyo National Stadium
19:02 JST (UTC+09)	Franta 42'	J. League		Attendance: 45,033; Referee: Tatsumi Ōno; Assistant referees: Mitsuru Satō, Kazuaki Hamaguchi; Fourth official: Morio Okamoto

29 May 1993 1st-5	Urawa Red Diamonds	1–1 (a.s.d.e.t.) (4–2 p)	Verdy Kawasaki	Urawa Komaba Stadium
19:04 JST (UTC+09)	Kawano 49'	J. League	Hashiratani 6'	Attendance: 9,690; Referee: Masayoshi Okada; Assistant referees: Naotsugu Fuse, Kimio Izaki; Fourth official: Morihiko Yamaji
	Penalties
	(penalty scored) Trivisonno; (penalty scored) Hirose; (penalty scored) Fukuda; (penalty scored) Hori		(penalty missed) Hashiratani; (penalty scored) Miura; (penalty scored) Kitazawa; (penalty missed) Pereira

2 June 1993 1st-6	Urawa Red Diamonds	0–1	Yokohama Marinos	Urawa Komaba Stadium
19:02 JST (UTC+09)		J. League	Noda 77'	Attendance: 9,088; Referee: Hitoshi Yamada; Assistant referees: Toshiyuki Mayuzumi, Kazuaki Hamaguchi; Fourth official: Morihiko Yamaji

5 June 1993 1st-7	Sanfrecce Hiroshima	1–0	Urawa Red Diamonds	Hiroshima Stadium
18:32 JST (UTC+09)	Moriyama 71'	J. League		Attendance: 14,605; Referee: Yōtarō Moritsu; Assistant referees: Yoshikazu Hiroshima, Hiroshi Tanabe

9 June 1993 1st-8	Kashima Antlers	3–1	Urawa Red Diamonds	Kashima Soccer Stadium
19:03 JST (UTC+09)	Kurosaki 2', 33'; Alcindo 59'	J. League	Fukuda 2'	Attendance: 15,050; Referee: Kōetsu Kikuchi; Assistant referees: Naotsugu Fuse, Masato Nogami; Fourth official: Ichirō Inukai

12 June 1993 1st-9	Urawa Red Diamonds	2–1	Shimizu S-Pulse	Urawa Komaba Stadium
18:34 JST (UTC+09)	Fukuda 61' (pen.); Mizuuchi 66'	J. League	Aoshima 34'	Attendance: 9,590; Referee: Tetsuya Hamana; Assistant referees: Mitsuru Satō, Hisashi Uemura; Fourth official: Morihiko Yamaji

16 June 1993 1st-10	Nagoya Grampus Eight	3–1	Urawa Red Diamonds	Nagoya Mizuho Football Stadium
19:00 JST (UTC+09)	Jorginho 25'; Egawa 49'; Sawairi 61'	J. League	Motoyoshi 62'	Attendance: 12,227; Referee: Hitoshi Yamada; Assistant referees: Yoshio Sawada, Yoshikazu Hiroshima; Fourth official: Takayoshi Kashino

19 June 1993 1st-11	Urawa Red Diamonds	1–3	Gamba Osaka	Urawa Komaba Stadium
15:31 JST (UTC+09)	Fukuda 84' (pen.)	J. League	Nagashima 22'; Isogai 46'; Matsunami 73'	Attendance: 8,953; Referee: Hideo Kikuchi; Assistant referees: Kimio Izaki, Naotsugu Fuse; Fourth official: Morihiko Yamaji

23 June 1993 1st-12	Urawa Red Diamonds	2–3	JEF United Ichihara	Urawa Komaba Stadium
19:03 JST (UTC+09)	Mochizuki 17'; Mizuuchi 51'	J. League	Pavel 39', 49', 71'	Attendance: 8,514; Referee: Kōetsu Kikuchi; Assistant referees: Takashi Kunori, Naotsugu Fuse; Fourth official: Morihiko Yamaji

26 June 1993 1st-13	Verdy Kawasaki	1–0	Urawa Red Diamonds	Kawasaki Todoroki Stadium
19:03 JST (UTC+09)	Miura 83'	J. League		Attendance: 10,078; Referee: Kiyoshi Ōta; Assistant referees: Hiroshi Fukuda, Masahiro Katagiri; Fourth official: Norio Nishiura

30 June 1993 1st-14	Yokohama Marinos	5–1	Urawa Red Diamonds	Yokohama Mitsuzawa Football Stadium
19:00 JST (UTC+09)	Díaz 9', 47', 53'; Bisconti 36'; K. Kimura 39'	J. League	Mizuuchi 52'	Attendance: 12,110; Referee: Shizuo Takada; Assistant referees: Mitsuru Satō, Keiichi Sunakawa; Fourth official: Mitsuo Ōno

3 July 1993 1st-15	Urawa Red Diamonds	1–0	Sanfrecce Hiroshima	Urawa Komaba Stadium
18:31 JST (UTC+09)	Matsumoto 59'	J. League		Attendance: 9,013; Referee: Fumikazu Shioyazono; Assistant referees: Takashi Kunori, Naotsugu Fuse; Fourth official: Morihiko Yamaji

7 July 1993 1st-16	Urawa Red Diamonds	0–2	Kashima Antlers	Urawa Komaba Stadium
19:04 JST (UTC+09)		J. League	Ishii 9'; Kurosaki 55'	Attendance: 9,325; Referee: Martin Bodenham; Assistant referees: Tetsuya Hamana, Fumikazu Shioyazono; Fourth official: Morihiko Yamaji

10 July 1993 1st-17	Shimizu S-Pulse	0–0 (a.s.d.e.t.) (6–5 p)	Urawa Red Diamonds	Nihondaira Sports Stadium
18:59 JST (UTC+09)		J. League		Attendance: 9,448; Referee: Fumikazu Shioyazono; Assistant referees: Morihisa Yamaguchi, Yasushi Tsuchimoto; Fourth official: Takuji Fukazawa
	Penalties
	(penalty scored) Sanada; (penalty missed) Hasegawa; (penalty missed) Saitō; (penalty scored) Ōta; (penalty scored) Miura; (penalty scored) Horiike; (penalty scored) Sawanobori; (penalty scored) Mukōjima		(penalty scored) Hirose; (penalty scored) Mochizuki; (penalty missed) Matsumoto; (penalty missed) Trivisonno; (penalty scored) Tanaka; (penalty scored) E. Satō; (penalty scored) Nishino; (penalty missed) Imakura

14 July 1993 1st-18	Urawa Red Diamonds	0–2	Yokohama Flügels	Urawa Komaba Stadium
19:01 JST (UTC+09)		J. League	Watanabe 17'; Iwai 30'	Attendance: 8,905; Referee: Masayoshi Okada; Assistant referees: Kazuaki Hamaguchi, Masahiro Katagiri; Fourth official: Morihiko Yamaji

==== NICOS series ====
24 July 1993 2nd-1	Sanfrecce Hiroshima	4–0	Urawa Red Diamonds	Hiroshima Stadium
18:33 JST (UTC+09)	Kazama 17', 73'; Noh 36'; Kenichi Uemura 40'	J. League		Attendance: 13,067; Referee: Martin Bodenham; Assistant referees: Kōetsu Kikuchi, Hiroshi Tanabe; Fourth official: Satoshi Hanashige

31 July 1993 2nd-2	Urawa Red Diamonds	0–0 (a.s.d.e.t.) (4–2 p)	Yokohama Marinos	Urawa Komaba Stadium
18:32 JST (UTC+09)		J. League		Attendance: 9,375; Referee: Kiichirō Tachi; Assistant referees: Naotsugu Fuse, Kimio Izaki; Fourth official: Keiji Kamiara
	Penalties
	(penalty scored) Mochizuki; (penalty scored) Fukuda; (penalty scored) Hori; (penalty scored) Trivisonno		(penalty missed) Bisconti; (penalty scored) Ihara; (penalty scored) Mizunuma; (penalty missed) Koizumi

4 August 1993 2nd-3	Gamba Osaka	0–1	Urawa Red Diamonds	Expo '70 Commemorative Stadium
18:59 JST (UTC+09)		J. League	Hashiratani 3'	Attendance: 20,259; Referee: Hiroyuki Umemoto; Assistant referees: Yoshikazu Hiroshima, Sōichirō Kaneko; Fourth official: Tsuyoshi Miyake

7 August 1993 2nd-4	Nagoya Grampus Eight	4–1	Urawa Red Diamonds	Mie Sports Garden
18:31 JST (UTC+09)	Tsuruta 29'; Shimamura 48'; Hirano 56'; Garça 89'	J. League	Uehara 1'	Attendance: 11,858; Referee: Martin Bodenham; Assistant referees: Fumikazu Shioyazono, Kōetsu Kikuchi; Fourth official: Takayoshi Kashino

14 August 1993 2nd-5	Urawa Red Diamonds	2–3	JEF United Ichihara	Urawa Komaba Stadium
18:31 JST (UTC+09)	Mochizuki 34'; Hashiratani 47'	J. League	Otze 4', 16'; Pavel 84'	Attendance: 9,366; Referee: Hiroyuki Umemoto; Assistant referees: Toshiyuki Mayuzumi, Hisashi Uemura; Fourth official: Ichirō Kuwabara

20 August 1993 2nd-6	Urawa Red Diamonds	0–1	Yokohama Flügels	Urawa Komaba Stadium
19:00 JST (UTC+09)		J. League	Maeda 14'	Attendance: 9,267; Referee: Hideo Kikuchi; Assistant referees: Takashi Kunori, Naotsugu Fuse; Fourth official: Morihiko Yamaji

25 August 1993 2nd-7	Shimizu S-Pulse	3–0	Urawa Red Diamonds	Nihondaira Sports Stadium
18:59 JST (UTC+09)	Sawanobori 53'; Edu 67', 69'	J. League		Attendance: 8,699; Referee: Masayoshi Okada; Assistant referees: Yoshimi Ogawa, Yasushi Tsuchimoto; Fourth official: Masami Urayama

28 August 1993 2nd-8	Kashima Antlers	2–0	Urawa Red Diamonds	Kashima Soccer Stadium
19:05 JST (UTC+09)	Yoshida 38'; Santos 66'	J. League		Attendance: 14,353; Referee: Kiyoshi Ōta; Assistant referees: Naotsugu Fuse, Masato Nogami; Fourth official: Masao Komada

3 September 1993 2nd-9	Urawa Red Diamonds	0–6	Verdy Kawasaki	Urawa Komaba Stadium
19:03 JST (UTC+09)		J. League	Bismarck 7'; Ramos 38'; Miura 44'; Takeda 56', 88'; Y. Katō 79'	Attendance: 9,771; Referee: Masahiro Sogawa; Assistant referees: Toshiyuki Mayuzumi, Satoru Ishizawa; Fourth official: Morihiko Yamaji

6 November 1993 2nd-10	Yokohama Marinos	3–2 (a.s.d.e.t.)	Urawa Red Diamonds	Yokohama Mitsuzawa Football Stadium
15:01 JST (UTC+09)	Miura 48'; Díaz 73' (pen.); Everton 97'	J. League	F. Ikeda 23'; Hirose 85'	Attendance: 14,207; Referee: Tatsumi Ōno; Assistant referees: Takashi Kunori, Naotsugu Fuse; Fourth official: Tsuyoshi Karasawa

10 November 1993 2nd-11	Urawa Red Diamonds	1–2	Sanfrecce Hiroshima	Urawa Komaba Stadium
19:01 JST (UTC+09)	Hirose 33'	J. League	Noh 11'; Černý 23'	Attendance: 8,258; Referee: Shizuo Takada; Assistant referees: Yū Nakamura, Mitsuru Satō; Fourth official: Hisaharu Kitamura

13 November 1993 2nd-12	Urawa Red Diamonds	0–5	Nagoya Grampus Eight	Urawa Komaba Stadium
15:03 JST (UTC+09)		J. League	Jorginho 3', 62'; Elivélton 28'; Garça 40' (pen.), 44'	Attendance: 9,347; Referee: Tetsuya Hamana; Assistant referees: Naotsugu Fuse, Hisashi Uemura; Fourth official: Satoru Tanigawa

17 November 1993 2nd-13	JEF United Ichihara	2–3 (a.s.d.e.t.)	Urawa Red Diamonds	Tokyo National Stadium
19:00 JST (UTC+09)	Nakanishi 25'; Otze 75' (pen.)	J. League	Fukuda 69'; Rahn 86' (pen.); Mizuuchi 107'	Attendance: 53,570; Referee: Juan Carlos Crespi; Assistant referees: Kiyoshi Ōta, Toshiyuki Mayuzumi; Fourth official: Tatsuya Sakata

20 November 1993 2nd-14	Yokohama Flügels	2–1	Urawa Red Diamonds	Kagoshima Kamoike Stadium
14:02 JST (UTC+09)	Amarilla 17'; Edu 73' (pen.)	J. League	Mizuuchi 14'	Attendance: 15,121; Referee: Kenji Tanaka; Assistant referees: Yū Nakamura, Mitsuru Satō; Fourth official: Shōji Hamada

27 November 1993 2nd-15	Urawa Red Diamonds	0–2	Shimizu S-Pulse	Tokyo National Stadium
15:01 JST (UTC+09)		J. League	Sawanobori 22'; Edu 42'	Attendance: 50,348; Referee: Hideo Kikuchi; Assistant referees: Naotsugu Fuse, Takashi Kunori; Fourth official: Morihiko Yamaji

1 December 1993 2nd-16	Urawa Red Diamonds	2–1 (a.s.d.e.t.)	Kashima Antlers	Urawa Komaba Stadium
19:02 JST (UTC+09)	Rummenigge 4'; Motoyoshi 104'	J. League	Santos 43'	Attendance: 9,256; Referee: Tatsumi Ōno; Assistant referees: Toshiyuki Mayuzumi, Kazuaki Hamaguchi; Fourth official: Keiji Kamiara

8 December 1993 2nd-17	Verdy Kawasaki	4–0	Urawa Red Diamonds	Tokyo National Stadium
19:05 JST (UTC+09)	Miura 17', 27', 82'; Fujiyoshi 79'	J. League		Attendance: 50,310; Referee: Shizuo Takada; Assistant referees: Yū Nakamura, Mitsuru Satō; Fourth official: Kazuhiko Uchida

15 December 1993 2nd-18	Urawa Red Diamonds	2–0	Gamba Osaka	Urawa Komaba Stadium
19:00 JST (UTC+09)	Mizuuchi 39', 64'	J. League		Attendance: 8,940; Referee: Kiyoshi Ōta; Assistant referees: Yū Nakamura, Mitsuru Satō; Fourth official: Izumi Okada

=== Emperor's Cup ===
5 December 1993 1st Round	Otsuka Pharmaceutical	0–3	Urawa Red Diamonds	Yokohama Mitsuzawa Football Stadium
12:00 JST (UTC+09)	Mizuuchi 13', 59'; Fukuda 79'			Attendance: 14,000; Referee: Noboru Ishiyama

11 December 1993 2nd Round	Yokohama Flügels	4–3 (a.e.t.)	Urawa Red Diamonds	Tochigi Utsunomiya Green Stadium
13:02 JST (UTC+09)	Maeda 2'; Edu 42', 71', 97'		Fukuda 4', 35'; Mizuuchi 11'	Attendance: 14,702; Referee: Masahiro Sogawa; Assistant referees: ,

=== J.League Cup ===
11 September 1993 GL-B-1	Júbilo Iwata	4–0	Urawa Red Diamonds	Hamamatsu Stadium
14:00 JST (UTC+09)	Koga 15'; Endō 40'; Ōishi 55'; Tabata 88'	J. League		Attendance: 9,132; Referee: Fumikazu Shioyazono; Assistant referees: Yū Nakamura, Yoshio Sawada; Fourth official: Tōru Nagata

GL-B-2	bye

18 September 1993 GL-B-3	Urawa Red Diamonds	1–1 (a.s.d.e.t.) (4–5 p)	Yokohama Flügels	Omiya Football Stadium
18:31 JST (UTC+09)	Kawano 55'	J. League	Aldro 59'	Attendance: 9,743; Referee: Tetsuya Hamana; Assistant referees: Toshiyuki Mayuzumi, Satoru Ishizawa; Fourth official: Hisaharu Kitamura
	Penalties
	(penalty missed) Hashiratani; (penalty scored) Hori; (penalty scored) Trivisonno; (penalty scored) Mochizuki; (penalty scored) Rahn; (penalty missed) Uehara		(penalty scored) Edu; (penalty scored) Moner; (penalty scored) Maeda; (penalty missed) Watanabe; (penalty scored) Iwai; (penalty scored) Maezono

25 September 1993 GL-B-4	Shimizu S-Pulse	3–2	Urawa Red Diamonds	Sapporo Atsubetsu Stadium
14:03 JST (UTC+09)	Iwashita 34' (pen.), 53'; Marco Antonio 44'	J. League	Rummenigge 60' (pen.), 77'	Attendance: 20,237; Referee: Juan Carlos Crespi; Assistant referees: Fumikazu Shioyazono, Kimio Izaki; Fourth official: Kenichi Koshiyama

2 October 1993 GL-B-5	Urawa Red Diamonds	3–2	Nagoya Grampus Eight	Omiya Football Stadium
18:30 JST (UTC+09)	Hirose 23'; Mizuuchi 37'; Rummenigge 51'	J. League	Okayama 47'; Lineker 73' (pen.)	Attendance: 9,470; Referee: Kōetsu Kikuchi; Assistant referees: Toshiyuki Mayuzumi, Naotsugu Fuse; Fourth official: Izumi Okada

GL-B-6	bye

16 October 1993 GL-B-7	Urawa Red Diamonds	1–2	Yokohama Marinos	Omiya Football Stadium
18:30 JST (UTC+09)	Mochizuki 10'	J. League	Yamada 38'; Everton 76'	Attendance: 9,092; Referee: Fumikazu Shioyazono; Assistant referees: Toshiyuki Mayuzumi, Naotsugu Fuse; Fourth official: Masahisa Kajiwara

== Player statistics ==
No.	Pos	Nat	Player	Total		J-League		Emperor's Cup		J-League Cup	
No.	Pos	Nat	Player	Apps	Goals	Apps	Goals	Apps	Goals	Apps	Goals
	GK	(Japan) JPN	Akihisa Sonobe	0	0	0	0	0	0	0	0
	GK	(Japan) JPN	Hisashi Tsuchida	13	0	13	0	0	0	0	0
	GK	(Japan) JPN	Yūki Takita	17	0	14	0	0	0	3	0
	GK	(Japan) JPN	Norio Takahashi	0	0	0	0	0	0	0	0
	GK	(Japan) JPN	Motohiro Takamura	0	0	0	0	0	0	0	0
	DF	(Japan) JPN	Shinji Tanaka	22	0	22	0	0	0	0	0
	DF	(Argentina) ARG	Trivisonno	28	0	26	0	0	0	2	0
	DF	(Japan) JPN	Takeshi Motoyoshi	19	2	14	2	2	0	3	0
	DF	(Japan) JPN	Akinori Mikami	9	0	8	0	1	0	0	0
	DF	(Japan) JPN	Yukinori Muramatsu	13	0	13	0	0	0	0	0
	DF	(Japan) JPN	Futoshi Ikeda	23	1	18	1	0	0	5	0
	DF	(Japan) JPN	Makoto Yamazaki	12	0	6	0	2	0	4	0
	DF	(Japan) JPN	Tsutomu Nishino	20	0	18	0	0	0	2	0
	DF	(Japan) JPN	Hiroyuki Sawada	17	0	11	0	1	0	5	0
	DF	(Japan) JPN	Yoshinori Matsuda	0	0	0	0	0	0	0	0
	DF	(Japan) JPN	Tomo Satō	0	0	0	0	0	0	0	0
	MF	(Japan) JPN	Atsushi Natori	31	0	28	0	2	0	1	0
	MF	(Japan) JPN	Satoru Mochizuki	38	4	31	3	2	0	5	1
	MF	(Japan) JPN	Osamu Hirose	29	3	26	2	2	0	1	1
	MF	(Argentina) ARG	Morales	3	0	3	0	0	0	0	0
	MF	(Japan) JPN	Takafumi Hori	34	0	27	0	2	0	5	0
	MF	(Japan) JPN	Seiichi Makita	6	0	6	0	0	0	0	0
	MF	(Peru) PER	Edwin Uehara	21	1	19	1	0	0	2	0
	MF	(Japan) JPN	Eiji Satō	8	0	8	0	0	0	0	0
	MF	(Japan) JPN	Hiromichi Satō	0	0	0	0	0	0	0	0
	MF	(Japan) JPN	Yasuki Hashimoto	0	0	0	0	0	0	0	0
	MF	(Japan) JPN	Yasunori Tsukao	0	0	0	0	0	0	0	0
	MF	(Japan) JPN	Noriaki Shimura	0	0	0	0	0	0	0	0
	MF	(Japan) JPN	Kenji Sakaguchi	1	0	1	0	0	0	0	0
	FW	(Japan) JPN	Kōichi Hashiratani	22	2	18	2	1	0	3	0
	FW	(Argentina) ARG	Ferreyra	4	0	4	0	0	0	0	0
	FW	(Japan) JPN	Masahiro Fukuda	29	7	27	4	2	3	0	0
	FW	(Japan) JPN	Tsuyoshi Kino	0	0	0	0	0	0	0	0
	FW	(Japan) JPN	Yoshimasa Suda	4	0	4	0	0	0	0	0
	FW	(Japan) JPN	Hiroshi Ninomiya	22	0	17	0	1	0	4	0
	FW	(Japan) JPN	Yasushi Matsumoto	9	1	6	1	0	0	3	0
	FW	(Japan) JPN	Shinichi Kawano	8	2	7	1	0	0	1	1
	FW	(Japan) JPN	Nobuyasu Ikeda	12	0	12	0	0	0	0	0
	FW	(Japan) JPN	Masato Suzuki	0	0	0	0	0	0	0	0
	FW	(Japan) JPN	Hideyuki Imakura	2	0	2	0	0	0	0	0
	FW	(Japan) JPN	Takeshi Mizuuchi	24	11	18	7	2	3	4	1
	FW	(Japan) JPN	Kōichi Nakazato	0	0	0	0	0	0	0	0
	FW	(Japan) JPN	Ichirō Sugiura	0	0	0	0	0	0	0	0
	FW	(West Germany) FRG	Rahn †	13	1	7	1	2	0	4	0
	GK	(Czechoslovakia) TCH	Miro †	13	0	9	0	2	0	2	0
	MF	(West Germany) FRG	Rummenigge †	11	4	6	1	2	0	3	3

- † player(s) joined the team after the opening of this season.

== Transfers ==
In:

No.	Pos.	Nation	Player
—	MF	ARG	Marcelo Morales (from Emelec)
—	MF	JPN	Seiichi Makita (from NTT Kanto)
—	FW	ARG	Victor Ferreyra (from Dundee United)
—	FW	JPN	Hiroshi Ninomiya (loan return from Danubio)
—	FW	JPN	Shinichi Kawano (loan return from Argentino de Rosario)
—	DF	JPN	Futoshi Ikeda (from Aoyama Gakuin University)
—	DF	JPN	Tsutomu Nishino (from Kobe University)
—	DF	JPN	Yoshinori Matsuda (from Omiya Higashi High School)
—	DF	JPN	Tomo Satō (from Aomori Yamada High School)
—	DF	JPN	Kenji Sakaguchi (from Bunan Senior High School)
—	DF	JPN	Makoto Yamazaki (from National Institute of Fitness and Sports in Kanoya)
—	MF	JPN	Yasunori Tsukao (from Aomori Yamada High School)
—	MF	JPN	Noriaki Shimura (from Nirasaki Technical High School)
—	FW	JPN	Yoshimasa Suda (from Tokyo Gas)
—	FW	JPN	Nobuyasu Ikeda (from Waseda University)
—	DF	JPN	Hiroyuki Sawada (from Honda)
—	FW	JPN	Ichirō Sugiura (from Kanezuka FC)
—	FW	JPN	Masato Suzuki (from Urawa Nishi High School)

Out:

No.	Pos.	Nation	Player
—	DF	JPN	Katsuyoshi Shintō (to Fujita)
—	DF	JPN	Tadashi Sasaki (retired)
—	DF	JPN	Yoshinori Senbiki (to NEC Yamagata)
—	MF	ARG	Sergio Ariel Escudero (retired)
—	FW	JPN	Kazuo Ozaki (to Verdy Kawasaki)
—	FW	ARG	Osvaldo Escudero (to Platense)
—	FW	JPN	Tsutomu Satō (to Seino Transportation)
—	FW	JPN	Akihiro Kameda (to Kofu soccer club)
—	MF	JPN	Tsuyoshi Sanbuichi (retired)
—	DF	JPN	Kei Hatakeyama (to TDK)
—	DF	JPN	Hajime Kamo (retired)
—	DF	JPN	Jun Togari (retired)
—	MF	JPN	Shinichirō Nakajima (to Hakuhodo)
—	GK	JPN	Sadato Nishizuka (to Aoyama Gakuin University)

== Transfers during the season ==
=== In ===
- (West Germany) Uwe Rahn (from Eintracht Frankfurt on August)
- (West Germany) Michael Rummenigge (from Borussia Dortmund on September)
- (Czechoslovakia) Miro (from Dunajská Streda on September)
- (Japan) Kōichi Nakazato (loan return from Danubio on December)

=== Out ===
- (Japan) Kōichi Nakazato (lone to Danubio on March)
- (Argentina) Victor Ferreyra (released on June)
- (Argentina) Marcelo Morales (released on July)

== Other pages ==
- (in Japanese) J. League official site
- (in Japanese) Urawa Red Diamonds official site
