= 1992 Urawa Red Diamonds season =

Urawa Red Diamonds
1992 season
- Manager: Takaji Mori
- Stadium: Urawa Komaba Stadium (under repair)
- Emperor's Cup: Semifinals
- J.League Cup: GL 5th
- Top goalscorer: League: All: Kōichi Hashiratani (10)

1992 Urawa Red Diamonds season

== Team name ==
Club name
Mitsubishi Urawa Football Club
Nickname
Red Diamonds

== Competitions ==
Competitions	Position
Emperor's Cup	Semifinals
J.League Cup	GL 5th / 10 clubs

== Domestic results ==
=== Emperor's Cup ===
5 December 1992 1st Round	Urawa Red Diamonds	2–1	Ẽfini Sapporo	Omiya Football Stadium
14:00 JST (UTC+09:00)	Mochizuki 30'; Hashiratani 39'		F. K. Yamaguchi 18'	Attendance: 5,000; Referee: Toshiyuki Mayuzumi

6 December 1992 2nd Round	Urawa Red Diamonds	3–0	Fujitsu	Omiya Football Stadium
13:00 JST (UTC+09:00)	Hashiratani 36', 71', 76'			Attendance: 3,500; Referee: Tetsuya Hamana

20 December 1992 Quarterfinals	Urawa Red Diamonds	2–1	Kashima Antlers	Himeji Athletic Stadium
13:05 JST (UTC+09:00)	Fukuda 59'; Hirose 62'		Kurosaki 76'	Attendance: 15,000; Referee: Yōtarō Moritsu

23 December 1992 Semifinals	Verdy Kawasaki	2–2 (a.e.t.) (4–3 p)	Urawa Red Diamonds	Tokyo National Stadium
13:10 JST (UTC+09:00)	Takeda 31'; Miura 53'		Hirose 36'; Fukuda 41'	Attendance: 48,000; Referee: Hideo Kikuchi

=== J.League Cup ===
5 September 1992 GL-1	Urawa Red Diamonds	2–3 (sudden-death) (a.e.t.)	JEF United Ichihara	Omiya Football Stadium
18:02 JST (UTC+09:00)	Mochizuki 65'; Hashiratani 82'	J. League	Pavel 35' 93'; Sasaki 74'	Attendance: 4,934; Referee: Hideo Kikuchi; Assistant referees: Hitoshi Yamada; Kimio Izaki; Fourth official: Morihiko Yamaji

9 September 1992 GL-2	Sanfrecce Hiroshima	2–3 (sudden-death) (a.e.t.)	Urawa Red Diamonds	Hiroshima Stadium
18:30 JST (UTC+09:00)	Černý 55' (pen.); 77' (o.g.)	J. League	Fukuda 20'; Uehara 68'; Hashiratani 104'	Attendance: 3,128; Referee: Shizuo Takada; Assistant referees: Takayuki Kimura; Hiroshi Tanabe; Fourth official: 佐々木 仲也

12 September 1992 GL-3	Verdy Kawasaki	1–0	Urawa Red Diamonds	Kawasaki Todoroki Stadium
19:00 JST (UTC+09:00)	Miura 88' (pen.)	J. League		Attendance: 9,022; Referee: Kiyoshi Ōta; Assistant referees: Masayoshi Okada; Noboru Ishiyama; Fourth official: Michio Nakahara

19 September 1992 GL-4	Urawa Red Diamonds	3–2	Kashima Antlers	Omiya Football Stadium
18:00 JST (UTC+09:00)	Hashiratani 19', 86'; Fukuda 77'	J. League	Santos 44'; Milton 75'	Attendance: 8,948; Referee: Masahiro Sogawa; Assistant referees: Masahiko Natsui; Kimio Izaki; Fourth official: Morihiko Yamaji

22 September 1992 GL-5	Yokohama Flügels	1–2	Urawa Red Diamonds	Hiratsuka Stadium
19:00 JST (UTC+09:00)	Ikenoue 46'	J. League	Hashiratani 15'; Hori 74'	Attendance: 5,684; Referee: Fumikazu Shioyazono; Assistant referees: Masayoshi Okada; Noboru Ishiyama; Fourth official: Senri Takahashi

27 September 1992 GL-6	Urawa Red Diamonds	2–1	Yokohama Marinos	Kawagoe Stadium
14:00 JST (UTC+09:00)	Fukuda 46'; Hori 63'	J. League	Everton 10'	Attendance: 7,199; Referee: Yū Nakamura; Assistant referees: Hideo Kikuchi; Kiyoshi Ōta; Fourth official: Morihiko Yamaji

3 October 1992 GL-7	Shimizu S-Pulse	4–1	Urawa Red Diamonds	Nihondaira Sports Stadium
16:00 JST (UTC+09:00)	Ōenoki 9', 81'; Hasegawa 49', 89'	J. League	Ozaki 42'	Attendance: 5,321; Referee: Masayoshi Okada; Assistant referees: Yoshio Sawada; Yoshimi Ogawa; Fourth official: Takeshi Sakai

7 October 1992 GL-8	Urawa Red Diamonds	0–1	Nagoya Grampus Eight	Omiya Football Stadium
19:00 JST (UTC+09:00)		J. League	37' (o.g.)	Attendance: 9,696; Referee: Masahiro Sogawa; Assistant referees: Masayoshi Okada; Yū Nakamura; Fourth official: Morihiko Yamaji

11 October 1992 GL-9	Gamba Osaka	1–2 (sudden-death) (a.e.t.)	Urawa Red Diamonds	Kobe Universiade Memorial Stadium
14:01 JST (UTC+09:00)	Minobe 44'	J. League	Hashiratani 36'; Fukuda 107'	Attendance: 15,871; Referee: Morihisa Yamaguchi; Assistant referees: Kenji Tanaka; Akira Okada; Fourth official: Tetsuo Ebara

== Player statistics ==
No.	Pos	Nat	Player	Total		Emperor's Cup		J-League Cup	
No.	Pos	Nat	Player	Apps	Goals	Apps	Goals	Apps	Goals
	GK	(Japan) JPN	Akihisa Sonobe	0	0	0	0	0	0
	GK	(Japan) JPN	Hisashi Tsuchida	13	0	4	0	9	0
	GK	(Japan) JPN	Yūki Takita	0	0	0	0	0	0
	GK	(Japan) JPN	Norio Takahashi	0	0	0	0	0	0
	GK	(Japan) JPN	Sadato Nishizuka	0	0	0	0	0	0
	GK	(Japan) JPN	Motohiro Takamura	0	0	0	0	0	0
	DF	(Japan) JPN	Katsuyoshi Shintō	1	0	0	0	1	0
	DF	(Japan) JPN	Shinji Tanaka	13	0	4	0	9	0
	DF	(Japan) JPN	Yoshinori Senbiki	0	0	0	0	0	0
	DF	(Japan) JPN	Tadashi Sasaki	2	0	1	0	1	0
	DF	(Japan) JPN	Fujio Yamamoto	0	0	0	0	0	0
	DF	(Argentina) ARG	Trivisonno	13	0	4	0	9	0
	DF	(Japan) JPN	Takeshi Motoyoshi	8	0	3	0	5	0
	DF	(Japan) JPN	Kei Hatakeyama	0	0	0	0	0	0
	DF	(Japan) JPN	Hajime Kamo	0	0	0	0	0	0
	DF	(Japan) JPN	Jun Togari	0	0	0	0	0	0
	DF	(Japan) JPN	Akinori Mikami	0	0	0	0	0	0
	DF	(Japan) JPN	Yukinori Muramatsu	8	0	0	0	8	0
	MF	(Argentina) ARG	Osvaldo Escudero	11	0	4	0	7	0
	MF	(Japan) JPN	Atsushi Natori	13	0	4	0	9	0
	MF	(Argentina) ARG	Sergio Escudero	0	0	0	0	0	0
	MF	(Japan) JPN	Satoru Mochizuki	13	2	4	1	9	1
	MF	(Japan) JPN	Osamu Hirose	10	2	3	2	7	0
	MF	(Japan) JPN	Tsuyoshi Sanbuichi	0	0	0	0	0	0
	MF	(Japan) JPN	Takafumi Hori	11	2	4	0	7	2
	MF	(Japan) JPN	Shinichirō Nakajima	0	0	0	0	0	0
	MF	(Peru) PER	Edwin Uehara	10	1	2	0	8	1
	MF	(Japan) JPN	Eiji Satō	4	0	2	0	2	0
	MF	(Japan) JPN	Hiromichi Satō	0	0	0	0	0	0
	MF	(Japan) JPN	Yasuki Hashimoto	0	0	0	0	0	0
	FW	(Japan) JPN	Kazuo Ozaki	6	1	2	0	4	1
	FW	(Japan) JPN	Kōichi Hashiratani	12	10	4	4	8	6
	FW	(Japan) JPN	Akihiro Kameda	0	0	0	0	0	0
	FW	(Japan) JPN	Masahiro Fukuda	13	6	4	2	9	4
	FW	(Japan) JPN	Tsuyoshi Kino	0	0	0	0	0	0
	FW	(Japan) JPN	Tsutomu Satō	0	0	0	0	0	0
	FW	(Japan) JPN	Yasushi Matsumoto	2	0	2	0	0	0
	FW	(Japan) JPN	Hideyuki Imakura	0	0	0	0	0	0
	FW	(Japan) JPN	Takeshi Mizuuchi	0	0	0	0	0	0
	FW	(Japan) JPN	Kōichi Nakazato	1	0	0	0	1	0

- J.LEAGUE OFFICIAL GUIDE 1992-1993. ISBN 4-09-102301-0.
- J.LEAGUE OFFICIAL GUIDE 1993 Suntory series. 小学館. 1993. ISBN 4-09-102303-7.
- 浦和レッドダイヤモンズ; ベースボールマガジン社 (30 April 2002). URAWA REDS Official History 1992-2002 浦和レッズ10年史. ベースボール・マガジン社. ISBN 4-583-03685-X.
- J.LEAGUE YEARBOOK 1999. トランスアート. April 1999. ISBN 4-88752-099-9.

== Transfers ==
In:

No.	Pos.	Nation	Player
—	GK	JPN	Yūki Takita (from NTT Kanto)
—	GK	JPN	Norio Takahashi (from Nissan farm)
—	DF	JPN	Shinji Tanaka (from Nissan)
—	DF	JPN	Yukinori Muramatsu (from Tokyo University of Agriculture)
—	MF	JPN	Satoru Mochizuki (from NKK)
—	MF	JPN	Takafumi Hori (from Toshiba)
—	MF	PER	Edwin Uehara (from Deportivo Aelu)
—	MF	ARG	Sergio Escudero (from Atlanta)
—	FW	JPN	Kōichi Hashiratani (from Nissan)
—	FW	JPN	Akihiro Kameda (from Mazda)
—	DF	JPN	Jun Togari (from University of Tsukuba)
—	GK	JPN	Sadato Nishizuka (from Aoyama Gakuin University)
—	GK	JPN	Motohiro Takamura (from Nissan youth)
—	MF	JPN	Yasuki Hashimoto (from Shizuoka Gakuen Senior High School)
—	FW	JPN	Kōichi Nakazato (from Maebashi Ikuei High School)
—	FW	JPN	Hiroshi Ninomiya (from University of Tsukuba)
—	FW	JPN	Shinichi Kawano (from Osaka University of Commerce)

Out:

No.	Pos.	Nation	Player
2	DF	JPN	Makoto Taguchi
4	DF	JPN	Hisataka Ikuta
7	MF	JPN	Hiroyuki Tsujiya
9	FW	JPN	Hiromi Hara (retired)
11	FW	JPN	Yasushi Yoshida (retired)
12	DF	JPN	Morihiko Yamaji
15	FW	ARG	Carlos Mac Allister
17	FW	JPN	Norihiro Yasuda
23	GK	JPN	Hiroyuki Takahashi
31	DF	JPN	Akio Mashiko
32	DF	JPN	Daisuke Kitano (retired)
—	FW	JPN	Hiroshi Ninomiya (loan to Danubio)
—	FW	JPN	Shinichi Kawano (loan to Argentino de Rosario)

== Transfers during the season ==
=== In ===
none

=== Out ===
none

== Other pages ==
- (in Japanese) J. League official site
- (in Japanese) Urawa Red Diamonds official site
