= Hashiratani =

Hashiratani (written: 柱谷) is a Japanese surname. Notable people with the surname include:

- Koichi Hashiratani (柱谷 幸一, born 1961), Japanese footballer and manager
- Tetsuji Hashiratani (柱谷 哲二, born 1964), Japanese footballer and manager
