= Edwin Uehara =

Peruvian footballer (born 1969)

Edwin Uehara 上原 エドウィン
Personal information
- Full name: Edwin Uehara
- Date of birth: July 21, 1969 (age 57)
- Place of birth: Lima, Peru
- Height: 1.69 m (5 ft 6 1/2 in)
- Position: Midfielder

Senior career*
Years	Team	Apps	(Gls)
1987–1988	Deportivo AELU		
1989	Sporting Cristal		
1990–1992	Deportivo AELU		
1992–1995	Urawa Reds	23	(1)
1996	Tosu Futures	21	(4)
Total		44+	(5+)
- * Club domestic league appearances and goals

Edwin Uehara (上原 エドウィン, Uehara Edwin; born July 21, 1969) is a Peruvian former football player. His professional career lasted from 1987–1996.

== Playing career ==
Uehara was born in Lima, Peru on July 21, 1969. He is a Japanese Peruvian and sansei (third-generation Japanese immigrant), with roots in Okinawa Prefecture. Uehara played for Deportivo AELU and Sporting Cristal in Peru until 1992. He moved to Japan in June 1992 and joined Urawa Reds. Although he played many matches in 1992, his opportunity to play decreased due to restrictions on foreign players from 1993. In 1994, he again made limited appearances due to injury. Uehara moved to the Japan Football League club Tosu Futures in 1996, before retiring at the end of the 1996 season.

== Club statistics ==
Club performance			League		Cup		League Cup		Total	
Season	Club	League	Apps	Goals	Apps	Goals	Apps	Goals	Apps	Goals
Japan			League		Emperor's Cup		J.League Cup		Total	
1992	Urawa Reds	J1 League	-		2	0	8	1	10	1
1993	Urawa Reds	J1 League	19	1	0	0	2	0	21	1
1994	Urawa Reds	J1 League	4	0	0	0	0	0	4	0
1995	Urawa Reds	J1 League	0	0	0	0	-		0	0
1996	Tosu Futures	Football League	21	4	3	2	-		24	6
Total			44	5	5	2	10	1	59	8
