= Takeshi Motoyoshi =

Japanese footballer

Takeshi Motoyoshi 本吉 剛
Personal information
- Full name: Takeshi Motoyoshi
- Date of birth: July 26, 1967 (age 59)
- Place of birth: Yokohama, Kanagawa, Japan
- Height: 1.80 m (5 ft 11 in)
- Position: Defender

Youth career
- 1983–1985: Kamakura High School
- 1986–1989: Chuo University

Senior career*
| Years | Team | Apps | (Gls) |
| 1990–1991 | Fujita Industries | 25 | (3) |
| 1991–1994 | Urawa Reds | 34 | (3) |
| 1995–1996 | Otsuka Pharmaceutical | 44 | (4) |
| 1997–1998 | Tokyo Gas | 32 | (2) |
| Total | | 135 | (12) |
- * Club domestic league appearances and goals

Takeshi Motoyoshi (本吉 剛, Motoyoshi Takeshi; born July 26, 1967) is a former Japanese football player.

== Club career ==
Motoyoshi was born in Yokohama on July 26, 1967. After graduating from Chuo University, he joined Fujita Industries in 1990. He became a regular player as center back. In 1991, he moved to Mitsubishi Motors (later Urawa Reds). However, his opportunity to play decreased in 1994 and he moved to Japan Football League club Otsuka Pharmaceutical in 1995. He moved to Tokyo Gas in 1997. Although the club was promoted to new league J2 League end of 1998 season, he retired end of 1998 season.

== National team career ==
In 1988, when Motoyoshi was a Chuo University student, he was selected Japan national "B team" for 1988 Asian Cup. At this competition, he played 1 game. However, Japan Football Association don't count as Japan national team matches because this Japan team was "B team" not "top team"

== Club statistics ==
| Club performance | | | League | | Cup | | League Cup | | Total | |
| Season | Club | League | Apps | Goals | Apps | Goals | Apps | Goals | Apps | Goals |
| Japan | | | League | | Emperor's Cup | | J.League Cup | | Total | |
|---|---|---|---|---|---|---|---|---|---|---|
| 1990/91 | Fujita Industries | JSL Division 2 | 25 | 3 | 2 | 0 | 1 | 0 | 28 | 3 |
| 1991/92 | Mitsubishi Motors | JSL Division 1 | 16 | 1 | 3 | 0 | 0 | 0 | 19 | 1 |
| 1992 | Urawa Reds | J1 League | - | | 3 | 0 | 5 | 0 | 8 | 0 |
| 1993 | Urawa Reds | J1 League | 14 | 2 | 2 | 0 | 3 | 0 | 19 | 2 |
| 1994 | Urawa Reds | J1 League | 4 | 0 | 0 | 0 | 0 | 0 | 4 | 0 |
| 1995 | Otsuka Pharmaceutical | Football League | 27 | 1 | 1 | 0 | - | | 28 | 1 |
| 1996 | Otsuka Pharmaceutical | Football League | 17 | 3 | 3 | 1 | - | | 20 | 4 |
| 1997 | Tokyo Gas | Football League | 25 | 1 | 6 | 1 | - | | 31 | 2 |
| 1998 | Tokyo Gas | Football League | 7 | 1 | 0 | 0 | - | | 7 | 1 |
| Total | | | 135 | 12 | 17 | 2 | 9 | 0 | 161 | 14 |
