= Atsushi Natori =

Japanese footballer

Atsushi Natori 名取 篤
Personal information
- Full name: Atsushi Natori
- Date of birth: November 12, 1961 (age 64)
- Place of birth: Saitama, Saitama, Japan
- Height: 1.71 m (5 ft 7 1/2 in)
- Position: Midfielder

Youth career
- 1977–1979: Teikyo High School

Senior career*
| Years | Team | Apps | (Gls) |
| 1980–1994 | Urawa Reds | 246 | (9) |
| Total | | 246 | (9) |

International career
| 1988–1989 | Japan | 6 | (0) |
Medal record
Mitsubishi Motors
| Winner | Japan Soccer League | 1982 |
| Winner | JSL Cup | 1981 |
| Winner | Emperor's Cup | 1980 |
- * Club domestic league appearances and goals

Atsushi Natori (名取 篤, Natori Atsushi; born November 12, 1961) is a former Japanese football player. He played for the Japan national team.

== Club career ==
Natori was born in Saitama on November 12, 1961. After graduating from high school, he joined Mitsubishi Motors (later Urawa Reds) in 1980. The club won the champions in 1980 Emperor's Cup, 1981 JSL Cup and 1982 Japan Soccer League. Although he played as regular player from first season, he also played Division 2 because from the end of the 1980s the club performance was not good. In 1993 and 1994, the club finished at bottom place and he retired in end of 1994 season.

== National team career ==
In August 1979, when Natori was a high school student, he was selected Japan U-20 national team for 1979 World Youth Championship. But, he did not play in the match. On October 26, 1988, he debuted for Japan national team against South Korea. In 1989, he also played at 1990 World Cup qualification. He played 6 games for Japan until 1989.

== Club statistics ==
| Club performance | | | League | | Cup | | League Cup | | Total | |
| Season | Club | League | Apps | Goals | Apps | Goals | Apps | Goals | Apps | Goals |
| Japan | | | League | | Emperor's Cup | | J.League Cup | | Total | |
|---|---|---|---|---|---|---|---|---|---|---|
| 1980 | Mitsubishi Motors | JSL Division 1 | 18 | 3 | 5 | 0 | 1 | 0 | 24 | 3 |
| 1981 | Mitsubishi Motors | JSL Division 1 | 15 | 1 | 2 | 0 | 4 | 1 | 21 | 2 |
| 1982 | Mitsubishi Motors | JSL Division 1 | 14 | 1 | 2 | 0 | 0 | 0 | 16 | 1 |
| 1983 | Mitsubishi Motors | JSL Division 1 | 14 | 1 | 1 | 0 | 1 | 0 | 16 | 1 |
| 1984 | Mitsubishi Motors | JSL Division 1 | 18 | 0 | 1 | 0 | 2 | 0 | 21 | 0 |
| 1985/86 | Mitsubishi Motors | JSL Division 1 | 21 | 0 | 3 | 1 | 2 | 0 | 26 | 1 |
| 1986/87 | Mitsubishi Motors | JSL Division 1 | 22 | 2 | 2 | 0 | 0 | 0 | 24 | 2 |
| 1987/88 | Mitsubishi Motors | JSL Division 1 | 21 | 0 | 2 | 0 | 3 | 0 | 26 | 0 |
| 1988/89 | Mitsubishi Motors | JSL Division 1 | 17 | 1 | 1 | 0 | 4 | 1 | 22 | 2 |
| 1989/90 | Mitsubishi Motors | JSL Division 2 | 25 | 0 | 1 | 0 | 1 | 0 | 27 | 0 |
| 1990/91 | Mitsubishi Motors | JSL Division 1 | 19 | 0 | 2 | 0 | 2 | 0 | 23 | 0 |
| 1991/92 | Mitsubishi Motors | JSL Division 1 | 21 | 0 | 2 | 0 | 1 | 0 | 24 | 0 |
| 1992 | Urawa Reds | J1 League | - | | 4 | 0 | 9 | 0 | 13 | 0 |
| 1993 | Urawa Reds | J1 League | 28 | 0 | 2 | 0 | 1 | 0 | 31 | 0 |
| 1994 | Urawa Reds | J1 League | 3 | 0 | 0 | 0 | 0 | 0 | 3 | 0 |
| Total | | | 246 | 9 | 30 | 1 | 31 | 2 | 307 | 12 |

== National team statistics ==
Japan national team
| Year | Apps | Goals |
|---|---|---|
| 1988 | 1 | 0 |
| 1989 | 5 | 0 |
| Total | 6 | 0 |
