= Miroslav Mentel =

Slovak footballer (born 1962)

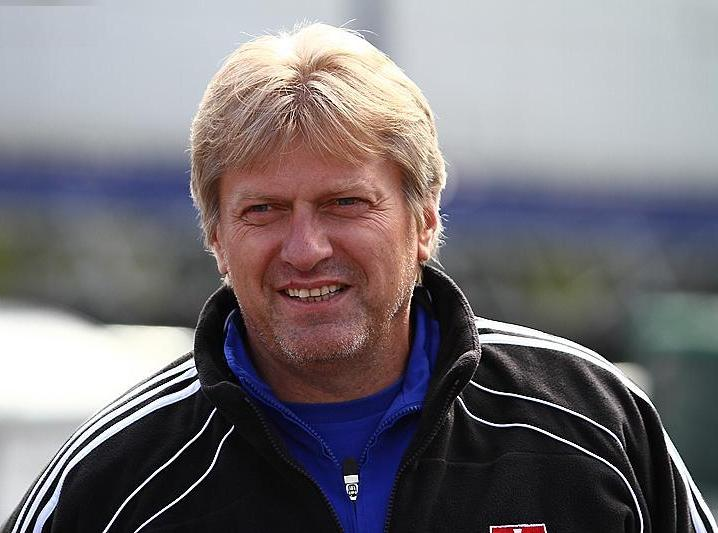

Personal information
- Date of birth: 2 December 1962 (age 63)
- Place of birth: Šurany, Czechoslovakia
- Height: 1.91 m (6 ft 3 in)
- Position: Goalkeeper

Senior career*
Years	Team	Apps	(Gls)
1980–1983	Inter Bratislava	51	(0)
1983–1985	Dukla Banská Bystrica	28	(0)
1985–1989	Inter Bratislava	48	(0)
- Agro Hurbanovo
1992–1993	DAC Dunajská Streda	28	(0)
1993–1994	Urawa Reds	10	(0)
1995–1996	FC Kaučuk Opava	29	(0)
- ZTS Dubnica

Managerial career
- 2001–2002: SFC Opava
- 2009–2016: FK Senica (assistant)
- 2016–2017: FK Senica
- 2019–: FC Petržalka (goalkeeping coach)
- 2020-2022: FK Senica (assistant)
- 2022-: FK Inter Bratislava (goalkeeping coach)
- * Club domestic league appearances and goals

Miroslav "Miro" Mentel (born 2 December 1962) is a Slovak former footballer who is coach of goalkeepers in Slovakia national football team and also FK Inter Bratislava.

Mentel was born in Šurany. He played as a goalkeeper for FK Inter Bratislava, Dukla Banská Bystrica and DAC Dunajská Streda in the Czechoslovak First League. He also played a season in the Gambrinus liga following the dissolution of Czechoslovakia for FC Kaučuk Opava.

He coached SFC Opava.

== Career statistics ==
Club performance			League		Cup		League Cup		Total	
Season	Club	League	Apps	Goals	Apps	Goals	Apps	Goals	Apps	Goals
Japan			League		Emperor's Cup		J.League Cup		Total	
1993	Urawa Reds	J1 League	9	0	2	0	2	0	13	0
1994	Urawa Reds	J1 League	1	0	0	0	0	0	1	0
Total			10	0	2	0	2	0	14	0
