= Yoshinori Matsuda =

Japanese footballer

Yoshinori Matsuda 松田 考功
Personal information
- Full name: Yoshinori Matsuda
- Date of birth: August 14, 1974 (age 52)
- Place of birth: Misato, Saitama, Japan
- Height: 1.75 m (5 ft 9 in)
- Position: Defender

Youth career
- 1990–1992: Omiya Higashi High School

Senior career*
Years	Team	Apps	(Gls)
1993–1994	Urawa Reds	0	(0)
1995–2002	Sagan Tosu	131	(4)
Total		131	(4)
- * Club domestic league appearances and goals

Yoshinori Matsuda (松田 考功, Matsuda Yoshinori; born August 14, 1974) is a former Japanese football player.

== Playing career ==
Matsuda was born in Misato on August 14, 1974. After graduating from high school, he joined his local club Urawa Reds in 1993. However he could not play at all in the match in 2 seasons. In 1995, he moved to Japan Football League club Tosu Futures (later Sagan Tosu). He played many matches as defender and the club was promoted to J2 League in 1999. His opportunity to play decreased in 2002 and he retired at the end of the 2002 season.

== Career statistics ==
Appearances and goals by club, season and competition
Club	Season	League			Emperor's Cup		J.League Cup		Total	
Club	Season	Division	Apps	Goals	Apps	Goals	Apps	Goals	Apps	Goals
Urawa Reds	1993	J1 League	0	0	0	0	0	0	0	0
Urawa Reds	1994	J1 League	0	0	0	0	0	0	0	0
Tosu Futures	1995	Football League	10	0	1	0	-		11	0
Tosu Futures	1996	Football League	24	2	3	0	-		27	2
Sagan Tosu	1997	Football League	14	0	3	0	3	0	20	0
Sagan Tosu	1998	Football League	13	1	3	0	3	0	19	1
Sagan Tosu	1999	J2 League	12	1	1	0	1	0	14	1
Sagan Tosu	2000	J2 League	28	0	3	0	2	0	33	0
Sagan Tosu	2001	J2 League	21	0	0	0	2	0	23	0
Sagan Tosu	2002	J2 League	9	0	0	0	-		9	0
Career total			131	4	14	0	11	0	156	4
