= Futoshi Ikeda =

Japanese footballer and manager

Futoshi Ikeda 池田 太
Personal information
- Full name: Futoshi Ikeda
- Date of birth: 4 October 1970 (age 56)
- Place of birth: Koganei, Tokyo, Japan
- Height: 1.77 m (5 ft 9 1/2 in)
- Position: Defender

Youth career
- 1986–1988: Bunan High School
- 1989–1992: Aoyama Gakuin University

Senior career*
Years	Team	Apps	(Gls)
1993–1996	Urawa Reds	53	(1)
Total		53	(1)

Managerial career
- 2012: Avispa Fukuoka (caretaker)
- 2017–2022: Japan U-20 women
- 2018: Japan U-17 women
- 2021–2024: Japan women
- 2025: Thailand women
- * Club domestic league appearances and goals

Futoshi Ikeda (池田 太, Ikeda Futoshi; born 4 October 1970) is a Japanese football manager and former player.

He was the head coach of the Japan women's national football team from 2021 until 2024.

== Playing career ==
Ikeda was born in Koganei on 4 October 1970. After graduating from Aoyama Gakuin University, he joined the Urawa Reds football club in 1993. He played many matches as a left side back during the first season. However, he did not play as much in 1995 and retired at the end of the 1996 season.

== Coaching career ==
After retirement, Ikeda started his coaching career with the Urawa Reds in 1997. He mainly coached the youth team (1997–2001) and the senior team (2002–2008). In 2012, he moved to Avispa Fukuoka and served as coach for the top team until 2016. In October 2012, manager Koji Maeda was dismissed and Ikeda managed as caretaker until the end of the season. In 2017, he became a manager for Japan women's U-20 national team. He led Japan to win the championship at the 2017 AFC U-19 Championship and qualified for the 2018 U-20 World Cup. In 2018, U-20 Japan won the championship at the U-20 World Cup. In November, he became the manager for the Japan women's U-17 national team for the 2018 FIFA U-17 Women's World Cup as Naoki Kusunose's successor. He was appointed as a head coach of Thailand women's team in January 2025, but after so many disappointing results, especially didn't qualify for the 2026 Asian Cup (which also a qualification for the 2027 World Cup and 2028 Olympics) and a fourth placed at the 2025 ASEAN Women's Championship (which lead the Thai team for the first time since 2013 not to achieve any medals in the tournament), he was dismissed from his job after seven months.

== Career statistics ==
Appearances and goals by club, season and competition
Club	Season	League			Emperor's Cup		J.League Cup		Total	
Club	Season	Division	Apps	Goals	Apps	Goals	Apps	Goals	Apps	Goals
Urawa Reds	1993	J1 League	18	1	0	0	5	0	23	1
Urawa Reds	1994	J1 League	27	0	1	0	2	0	30	0
Urawa Reds	1995	J1 League	8	0	0	0	—		8	0
Urawa Reds	1996	J1 League	0	0	0	0	0	0	0	0
Career total			53	1	1	0	7	0	61	1

== Managerial statistics ==
As of 19 August 2025

Managerial record by team and tenure
Team	From	To	Record							
Team	From	To	P	W	D	L	GF	GA	GD	Win %
Japan	1 October 2021	21 August 2024	44	27	6	11	107	34	+73	61.36
Thailand	8 January 2025	22 August 2025	15	7	1	7	46	22	+24	46.67
Career totals			59	34	7	18	153	56	+97	57.63

== Honours ==
=== Manager ===
Japan U20 women

- AFC U-19 Women's Championship: 2017
- FIFA U-20 Women's World Cup: 2018
