= Nobuyasu Ikeda =

Japanese footballer

Nobuyasu Ikeda 池田 伸康
Personal information
- Full name: Nobuyasu Ikeda
- Date of birth: 18 May 1970 (age 56)
- Place of birth: Saitama, Japan
- Height: 1.70 m (5 ft 7 in)
- Position: Midfielder

Team information
- Current team: Urawa Red Diamonds (Assistant Manager)

Youth career
- 1986–1988: Teikyo High School
- 1989–1992: Waseda University

Senior career*
Years	Team	Apps	(Gls)
1993–1999	Urawa Red Diamonds	107	(4)
2000	Kawasaki Frontale	9	(1)
2001–2002	Mito HollyHock	29	(1)
Total		145	(6)

Managerial career
- 2017–2019: Urawa Red Diamonds (assistant)
- 2023–: Urawa Red Diamonds (assistant)
- 2024: Urawa Red Diamonds (caretaker)
Medal record
Kawasaki Frontale
Runner-up	J.League Cup	2000
- * Club domestic league appearances and goals

Nobuyasu Ikeda (池田 伸康, Ikeda Nobuyasu; born 18 May 1970) is a former Japanese football player. He is currently the assistant manager of J1 League club, Urawa Red Diamonds.

== Playing career ==
Ikeda was born in Saitama on 18 May 1970. After graduating from Waseda University, he joined his local club,Urawa Red Diamonds, in 1993. He played often as an offensive midfielder. However, he did not play as much in 1997. In 2000, he moved to the newly promoted J1 League club, Kawasaki Frontale. However, he still did not play very often and he moved to the J2 League club Mito HollyHock in 2001. He retired at the end of the 2002 season.

== Personal life ==
Ikeda married wrestler Miyuu Yamamoto in 1995. They divorced in 1999.

== Career statistics ==
Appearances and goals by club, season and competition
Club	Season	League			Emperor's Cup		J.League Cup		Total	
Club	Season	Division	Apps	Goals	Apps	Goals	Apps	Goals	Apps	Goals
Urawa Reds	1993	J1 League	12	0	0	0	0	0	12	0
Urawa Reds	1994	J1 League	27	3	0	0	0	0	27	3
Urawa Reds	1995	J1 League	21	0	2	0	—		23	0
Urawa Reds	1996	J1 League	17	0	0	0	5	0	22	0
Urawa Reds	1997	J1 League	9	0	0	0	0	0	9	0
Urawa Reds	1998	J1 League	6	0	2	0	0	0	8	0
Urawa Reds	1999	J1 League	15	1	0	0	0	0	15	1
Kawasaki Frontale	2000	J1 League	9	1	1	0	0	0	10	1
Mito HollyHock	2001	J2 League	8	1	2	0	1	0	11	1
Mito HollyHock	2002	J2 League	21	0	2	0	—		23	0
Career total			145	6	9	0	5	0	159	6
