= Akinori Mikami =

Japanese footballer

Akinori Mikami 三上 明紀
Personal information
- Full name: Akinori Mikami
- Date of birth: June 12, 1969 (age 57)
- Place of birth: Yaizu, Shizuoka, Japan
- Height: 1.74 m (5 ft 8 1/2 in)
- Position: Forward

Youth career
- 1985–1987: Fujieda Higashi High School

Senior career*
Years	Team	Apps	(Gls)
1988–1994	Urawa Reds	27	(1)
Total		27	(1)
- * Club domestic league appearances and goals

Akinori Mikami (三上 明紀, Mikami Akinori; born June 12, 1969) is a former Japanese football player.

== Playing career ==
Mikami was born in Yaizu on June 12, 1969. After graduating from high school, he joined Mitsubishi Motors (later Urawa Reds) in 1988. Although he also played as left side back not only forward, he could not play many matches. He retired end of 1994 season.

== Club statistics ==
Club performance			League		Cup		League Cup		Total	
Season	Club	League	Apps	Goals	Apps	Goals	Apps	Goals	Apps	Goals
Japan			League		Emperor's Cup		J.League Cup		Total	
1988/89	Mitsubishi Motors	JSL Division 1	0	0	0	0			0	0
1989/90	Mitsubishi Motors	JSL Division 2	1	0	0	0	0	0	1	0
1990/91	Mitsubishi Motors	JSL Division 1	5	1	0	0	0	0	5	1
1991/92	Mitsubishi Motors	JSL Division 1	8	0	0	0	0	0	8	0
1992	Urawa Reds	J1 League	-		0	0	0	0	0	0
1993	Urawa Reds	J1 League	8	0	1	0	0	0	9	0
1994	Urawa Reds	J1 League	5	0	0	0	0	0	5	0
Total			27	1	1	0	0	0	28	1
