= Hiroshi Ninomiya (footballer, born 1969) =

Japanese footballer and manager

Hiroshi Ninomiya 二宮 浩
Personal information
- Full name: Hiroshi Ninomiya
- Date of birth: April 11, 1969 (age 57)
- Place of birth: Kumamoto, Japan
- Height: 1.75 m (5 ft 9 in)
- Position: Forward

Youth career
- 1985–1987: Kunimi High School

College career
Years	Team	Apps	(Gls)
1988–1991	University of Tsukuba		

Senior career*
Years	Team	Apps	(Gls)
1992–1994	Urawa Reds	17	(0)
1992	→ Danubio (loan)		
1995–1997	Mito HollyHock		

Managerial career
- 1999: Mito HollyHock
- * Club domestic league appearances and goals

Hiroshi Ninomiya (二宮 浩, Ninomiya Hiroshi; born April 11, 1969) is a Japanese manager and former footballer.

== Playing career ==
Ninomiya was born in Kumamoto Prefecture on April 11, 1969. After graduating from the University of Tsukuba, he joined Urawa Reds in 1992. In 1992, he moved to Uruguayan club Danubio on loan. In 1993, he returned to Urawa Reds and played many matches as a forward. In 1994, he did not make any appearances and so he moved to Regional Leagues club Prima Ham Tsuchiura (later Mito HollyHock). In 1997, the club was promoted to Japan Football League. He retired at the end of the 1997 season.

== Coaching career ==
After retirement, Ninomiya started his coaching career at Mito HollyHock in 1998. He served as coach under manager Toshiya Miura. In 1999, he succeeded Miura as manager. The club finished in 3rd place in 1999 Japan Football League and was promoted to J2 League. However, he did not have a license to manage in the J.League, and returned to being a coach. He left the club at the end of the 2000 season.

== Career statistics ==
Appearances and goals by club, season and competition
Club	Season	League			Emperor's Cup		J.League Cup		Total	
Club	Season	Division	Apps	Goals	Apps	Goals	Apps	Goals	Apps	Goals
Urawa Reds	1993	J1 League	17	0	1	0	4	0	22	0
Urawa Reds	1994	J1 League	0	0	0	0	0	0	0	0
Prima Ham Tsuchiura	1995	Regional Leagues			—		—			
Prima Ham Tsuchiura	1996	Regional Leagues					—			
Mito HollyHock	1997	Football League	17	4	0	0	—		17	4
Career total			34	4	1	0	4	0	39	4
