= Yoshiaki Sato =

Japanese footballer

Yoshiaki Sato 佐藤 慶明
Personal information
- Full name: Yoshiaki Sato
- Date of birth: June 19, 1969 (age 57)
- Place of birth: Osaka, Japan
- Height: 1.88 m (6 ft 2 in)
- Position: Forward

Youth career
- 1985–1987: Hokuyo High School
- 1988–1991: Doshisha University

Senior career*
Years	Team	Apps	(Gls)
1992–1993	Gamba Osaka	0	(0)
1994–1995	Urawa Reds	27	(9)
1995–1996	Kyoto Purple Sanga	20	(4)
Total		47	(13)

International career
1994	Japan	1	(0)
- * Club domestic league appearances and goals

Yoshiaki Sato (佐藤 慶明, Satō Yoshiaki; born June 19, 1969) is a former Japanese football player. He played for Japan national team.

== Club career ==
Sato was born in Osaka Prefecture on June 19, 1969. After graduating from Doshisha University, he joined Gamba Osaka in 1992. However he did not play in the match. In 1994, he moved to Urawa Reds and debuted in J1 League. However he lost opportunity to play in 1995. In July 1995, he moved to Japan Football League club Kyoto Purple Sanga. The club won the 2nd place and was promoted to J1 League. He retired end of 1996 season.

== National team career ==
On May 22, 1994, Sato debuted for Japan national team against Australia.

== Career statistics ==
=== Club ===
Appearances and goals by club, season and competition
Club	Season	League			Emperor's Cup		J.League Cup		Total	
Club	Season	Division	Apps	Goals	Apps	Goals	Apps	Goals	Apps	Goals
Gamba Osaka	1992	J1 League	—		0	0	0	0	0	0
Gamba Osaka	1993	J1 League	0	0	0	0	0	0	0	0
Urawa Reds	1994	J1 League	27	9	2	0	0	0	29	9
Urawa Reds	1995	J1 League	0	0	0	0	—		0	0
Kyoto Purple Sanga	1995	Football League	16	3	1	1	—		17	4
Kyoto Purple Sanga	1996	J1 League	4	1	0	0	5	1	9	2
Career total			47	13	3	1	5	1	55	15

=== International ===
Japan national team
Year	Apps	Goals
1994	1	0
Total	1	0
