= Tsutomu Nishino =

Japanese footballer

Tsutomu Nishino 西野 努
Personal information
- Full name: Tsutomu Nishino
- Date of birth: March 13, 1971 (age 55)
- Place of birth: Ikoma, Nara, Japan
- Height: 1.86 m (6 ft 1 in)
- Position: Defender

Youth career
- 1986–1988: Nara High School
- 1989–1992: Kobe University

Senior career*
Years	Team	Apps	(Gls)
1993–2001	Urawa Reds	134	(10)
Total		134	(10)
- * Club domestic league appearances and goals

Tsutomu Nishino (西野 努, Nishino Tsutomu; born March 13, 1971) is a former Japanese football player.

== Playing career ==
Nishino was born in Ikoma on March 13, 1971. After graduating from Kobe University, he joined Urawa Reds in 1993. He played many matches as center back from first season. In 1997, he became a regular player. In 1999, he could not play many matches and the club was relegated to J2 League. In 2000, he played many matches and the club was returned to J1 League in a year. He retired at the end of the 2001 season.

== Career statistics ==
Appearances and goals by club, season and competition
Club	Season	League			Emperor's Cup		J.League Cup		Total	
Club	Season	Division	Apps	Goals	Apps	Goals	Apps	Goals	Apps	Goals
Urawa Reds	1993	J1 League	18	0	0	0	2	0	20	0
Urawa Reds	1994	J1 League	0	0	0	0	0	0	0	0
Urawa Reds	1995	J1 League	17	0	2	0	—		19	0
Urawa Reds	1996	J1 League	0	0	0	0	3	0	3	0
Urawa Reds	1997	J1 League	25	3	1	0	5	0	31	3
Urawa Reds	1998	J1 League	27	2	3	0	4	0	34	2
Urawa Reds	1999	J1 League	9	1	0	0	0	0	9	1
Urawa Reds	2000	J2 League	27	4	4	0	2	0	33	4
Urawa Reds	2001	J1 League	11	0	0	0	2	0	13	0
Career total			134	10	10	0	18	0	162	10
