= Yoshinori Sembiki =

Japanese footballer and manager

Yoshinori Sembiki 千疋 美徳
Personal information
- Full name: Yoshinori Sembiki
- Date of birth: January 5, 1964 (age 62)
- Place of birth: Kitakyushu, Japan
- Height: 1.65 m (5 ft 5 in)
- Position: Defender

Youth career
- Kyushu Kyoritsu University

Senior career*
Years	Team	Apps	(Gls)
1985–1990	Yomiuri	35	(1)
1990–1992	NKK	32	(1)
1992	Urawa Reds	0	(0)
1993–1994	NEC Yamagata		
1995	Fukuoka Blux		
Total		67	(2)

Managerial career
- 2003: Sagan Tosu
- 2005–2006: New Wave Kitakyushu
Medal record
Yomiuri
Winner	Japan Soccer League	1986/87
Runner-up	Japan Soccer League	1989/90
Winner	JSL Cup	1985
Winner	Emperor's Cup	1986
Winner	Emperor's Cup	1987
- * Club domestic league appearances and goals

Yoshinori Sembiki (千疋 美徳, Sembiki Yoshinori; born January 5, 1964) is a former Japanese football player and manager.

== Playing career ==
Sembiki was born in Kitakyushu on January 5, 1964. After graduating from Kyushu Kyoritsu University, he joined Japan Soccer League club Yomiuri in 1985. Although he played many matches as left side back in 1986-87 season, he could not become a regular player behind Satoshi Tsunami. He moved to NKK in 1990 and played many matches. In 1992, Japan Soccer League was folded and founded new league J1 League. He moved to J1 League club Urawa Reds in 1992. However he could not play in the match. From 1993, he played for NEC Yamagata (1993–94) and his local club Fukuoka Blux (1995). He retired at the end of the 1995 season.

== Coaching career ==
After retirement, Sembiki managed Avispa Fukuoka (former Fukuoka Blux) youth team (1996–99) and his alma mater Kyushu Kyoritsu University (2000–02). In 2003, he signed with Sagan Tosu. Although he managed the club, the club won only 3 matches out of 44 matches, and he resigned at the end of the 2003 season. In 2005, he signed with his local club New Wave Kitakyushu in the Regional Leagues. He managed the club until the end of the 2006 season.

== Club statistics ==
Club performance			League		Cup		League Cup		Total	
Season	Club	League	Apps	Goals	Apps	Goals	Apps	Goals	Apps	Goals
Japan			League		Emperor's Cup		J.League Cup		Total	
1985/86	Yomiuri	JSL Division 1	2	0	0	0	0	0	2	0
1986/87	Yomiuri	JSL Division 1	19	1	3	1	1	0	23	2
1987/88	Yomiuri	JSL Division 1	8	0	1	0	0	0	9	0
1988/89	Yomiuri	JSL Division 1	2	0	0	0	0	0	2	0
1989/90	Yomiuri	JSL Division 1	4	0	0	0	0	0	4	0
1990/91	NKK	JSL Division 1	11	0			2	0	13	0
1991/92	NKK	JSL Division 2	21	1	-		2	0	23	1
1992	Urawa Reds	J1 League	-		0	0	0	0	0	0
Total			67	2	4	1	5	0	76	3

== Managerial statistics ==
Team	From	To	Record				
Team	From	To	G	W	D	L	Win %
Sagan Tosu	2003	2003	44	3	11	30	6.82
Total			44	3	11	30	6.82
