= Norio Takahashi =

Japanese footballer (born 1971)

Norio Takahashi 高橋 範夫
Personal information
- Full name: Norio Takahashi
- Date of birth: March 15, 1971 (age 55)
- Place of birth: Yachiyo, Chiba, Japan
- Height: 1.81 m (5 ft 11 1/2 in)
- Position: Goalkeeper

Youth career
- 1986–1988: Chiba Kita High School
- 1989–1990: Chiba University

Senior career*
Years	Team	Apps	(Gls)
1991	Nissan Motors	0	(0)
1992–1995	Urawa Red Diamonds	0	(0)
1996–2002	Brummell Sendai / Vegalta Sendai	135	(0)
2003	Sagan Tosu	12	(0)
2004	Unión San Felipe		
2005–2006	Tokushima Vortis	47	(0)
2007–2008	Albirex Niigata Singapore		
Total		194	(0)

Managerial career
- 2018–: Japan U-20 (GK coach)
- * Club domestic league appearances and goals

Norio Takahashi (高橋 範夫, Takahashi Norio; born March 15, 1971) is a former Japanese football player.

His son Yuriya is also a footballer.

== Playing career ==
Takahashi was born in Yachiyo on March 15, 1971. Through Chiba University, he joined Nissan Motors in 1991 and he played at reserve team. He moved to Urawa Red Diamonds in 1992. However he could not play in the match. He moved to Japan Football League club Brummell Sendai (later Vegalta Sendai) in 1996. He played many matches in 1996. Although he could hardly play in the match in 1997, his opportunity to play increased and he became a regular goalkeeper in 2000. In 2001, he played full time in all matches and the club was promoted to J1 League. He moved to Sagan Tosu in 2003. He moved to Chile and joined Unión San Felipe in 2004. In 2005, he returned to Japan and played for Tokushima Vortis until 2006. In 2007, he moved to Albirex Niigata Singapore. He retired end of 2008 season.

== Club statistics ==
Club performance			League		Cup		League Cup		Total	
Season	Club	League	Apps	Goals	Apps	Goals	Apps	Goals	Apps	Goals
Japan			League		Emperor's Cup		J.League Cup		Total	
1992	Urawa Red Diamonds	J1 League	-		0	0	0	0	0	0
1993	Urawa Red Diamonds	J1 League	0	0	0	0	0	0	0	0
1994	Urawa Red Diamonds	J1 League	0	0	0	0	0	0	0	0
1995	Urawa Red Diamonds	J1 League	0	0	0	0	-		0	0
1996	Brummell Sendai	Football League	23	0	3	0	-		26	0
1997	Brummell Sendai	Football League	0	0	1	0	0	0	1	0
1998	Brummell Sendai	Football League	4	0	0	0	3	0	7	0
1999	Vegalta Sendai	J2 League	12	0	0	0	2	0	14	0
2000	Vegalta Sendai	J2 League	34	0	1	0	1	0	36	0
2001	Vegalta Sendai	J2 League	44	0	1	0	2	0	47	0
2002	Vegalta Sendai	J1 League	18	0	0	0	3	0	21	0
2003	Sagan Tosu	J2 League	12	0	0	0	-		12	0
2004	Unión San Felipe		0	0					0	0
2005	Tokushima Vortis	J2 League	23	0	0	0	-		23	0
2006	Tokushima Vortis	J2 League	24	0	0	0	-		24	0
2007	Albirex Niigata Singapore	S.League								
2008	Albirex Niigata Singapore	S.League	32	0	1	0	0	0	33	0
Total			226	0	7	0	11	0	244	0
