= Seiichi Makita =

Japanese footballer

Seiichi Makita 巻田 清一
Personal information
- Full name: Seiichi Makita
- Date of birth: July 11, 1968 (age 58)
- Place of birth: Tokyo, Japan
- Height: 1.82 m (5 ft 11 1/2 in)
- Positions: Defender; midfielder

Youth career
- 1984–1986: Teikyo High School
- 1987–1990: Tokai University

Senior career*
Years	Team	Apps	(Gls)
1991–1992	NTT Kanto	38	(3)
1993	Urawa Reds	6	(0)
1994–1996	Fujitsu	73	(4)
1997–1998	Mito HollyHock	49	(0)
Total		166	(7)
- * Club domestic league appearances and goals

Seiichi Makita (巻田 清一, Makita Seiichi; born July 11, 1968) is a former Japanese football player.

== Playing career ==
Makita was born in Tokyo on July 11, 1968. After graduating from Tokai University, he joined NTT Kanto in 1991. He played as regular player from first season. In 1993, he moved to Urawa Reds. However he could hardly play in the match. In 1994, he moved to Japan Football League (JFL) club Fujitsu. He played as regular player in 3 seasons. In 1997, he moved to JFL club Mito HollyHock. He played as regular player in 2 seasons and he retired end of 1998 season.

== Club statistics ==
Club performance			League		Cup		League Cup		Total	
Season	Club	League	Apps	Goals	Apps	Goals	Apps	Goals	Apps	Goals
Japan			League		Emperor's Cup		J.League Cup		Total	
1991/92	NTT Kanto	JSL Division 2	27	2	-		1	0	28	2
1992	NTT Kanto	Football League	11	1	-		-		11	1
1993	Urawa Reds	J1 League	6	0	0	0	0	0	6	0
1994	Fujitsu	Football League	18	0	-		-		18	0
1995	Fujitsu	Football League	30	1	1	0	-		31	1
1996	Fujitsu	Football League	25	3	4	1	-		29	4
1997	Mito HollyHock	Football League	27	0	2	0	-		29	0
1998	Mito HollyHock	Football League	22	0	2	0	-		24	0
Total			266	7	9	1	1	0	276	8
