= Yoshimasa Suda =

Japanese footballer

Yoshimasa Suda 須田 芳正
Personal information
- Full name: Yoshimasa Suda
- Date of birth: August 22, 1967 (age 59)
- Place of birth: Tokyo, Japan
- Height: 1.68 m (5 ft 6 in)
- Position: Forward

Youth career
- 1993–1995: Gyosei High School
- 1986–1989: Keio University

Senior career*
Years	Team	Apps	(Gls)
1990–1992	Tokyo Gas		
1993	Urawa Reds	4	(0)
1994	Kofu SC	25	(1)
Total		29	(1)
- * Club domestic league appearances and goals

Yoshimasa Suda (須田 芳正, Suda Yoshimasa; born August 22, 1967) is a former Japanese football player.

== Playing career ==
Suda was born in Tokyo on August 22, 1967. After graduating from Keio University, he joined Regional Leagues club Tokyo Gas in 1990. He played many matches as a forward and the club was promoted to the Japan Soccer League in 1991. In 1993, he moved to Urawa Reds. However, he could hardly play in the match. In 1994, he moved to Japan Football League club Kofu SC. Although he played many matches in 1994, he retired at the end of the season.

== Club statistics ==
Club performance			League		Cup		League Cup		Total	
Season	Club	League	Apps	Goals	Apps	Goals	Apps	Goals	Apps	Goals
Japan			League		Emperor's Cup		J.League Cup		Total	
1990	Tokyo Gas	Regional Leagues								
1991/92	Tokyo Gas	JSL Division 2	26	1			1	0	27	1
1993	Urawa Reds	J1 League	4	0	0	0	0	0	4	0
1994	Kofu SC	Football League	25	1	0	0	-		25	1
Total			55	2	0	0	1	0	56	2
