= Yasushi Matsumoto =

Japanese footballer

Yasushi Matsumoto 松本 安司
Personal information
- Full name: Yasushi Matsumoto
- Date of birth: June 17, 1969 (age 57)
- Place of birth: Mie, Japan
- Height: 1.72 m (5 ft 7 1/2 in)
- Position: Midfielder

Youth career
- 1985–1987: Yokkaichi Chuo Technical High School

Senior career*
Years	Team	Apps	(Gls)
1988–1993	Urawa Reds		
- * Club domestic league appearances and goals

Yasushi Matsumoto (松本 安司, Matsumoto Yasushi; born June 17, 1969) is a former Japanese football player.

== Playing career ==
Matsumoto was born in Mie Prefecture on June 17, 1969. After graduating from high school, he joined Japan Soccer League club Mitsubishi Motors (later Urawa Reds) in 1988. In 1992, Japan Soccer League was folded and founded new league J1 League. He played several matches in J1 League. However he could not play many matches and retired end of 1993 season.

== Club statistics ==
Club performance			League		Cup		League Cup		Total	
Season	Club	League	Apps	Goals	Apps	Goals	Apps	Goals	Apps	Goals
Japan			League		Emperor's Cup		J.League Cup		Total	
1988/89	Mitsubishi Motors	JSL Division 1								
1989/90	Mitsubishi Motors	JSL Division 2								
1990/91	Mitsubishi Motors	JSL Division 1								
1991/92	Mitsubishi Motors	JSL Division 1								
1992	Urawa Reds	J1 League	-		2	0	0	0	2	0
1993	Urawa Reds	J1 League	6	1	0	0	3	0	9	1
Total			6	1	2	0	3	0	11	1
