= Masahiro Fukuda =

Japanese footballer (born 1966)

Masahiro Fukuda 福田 正博
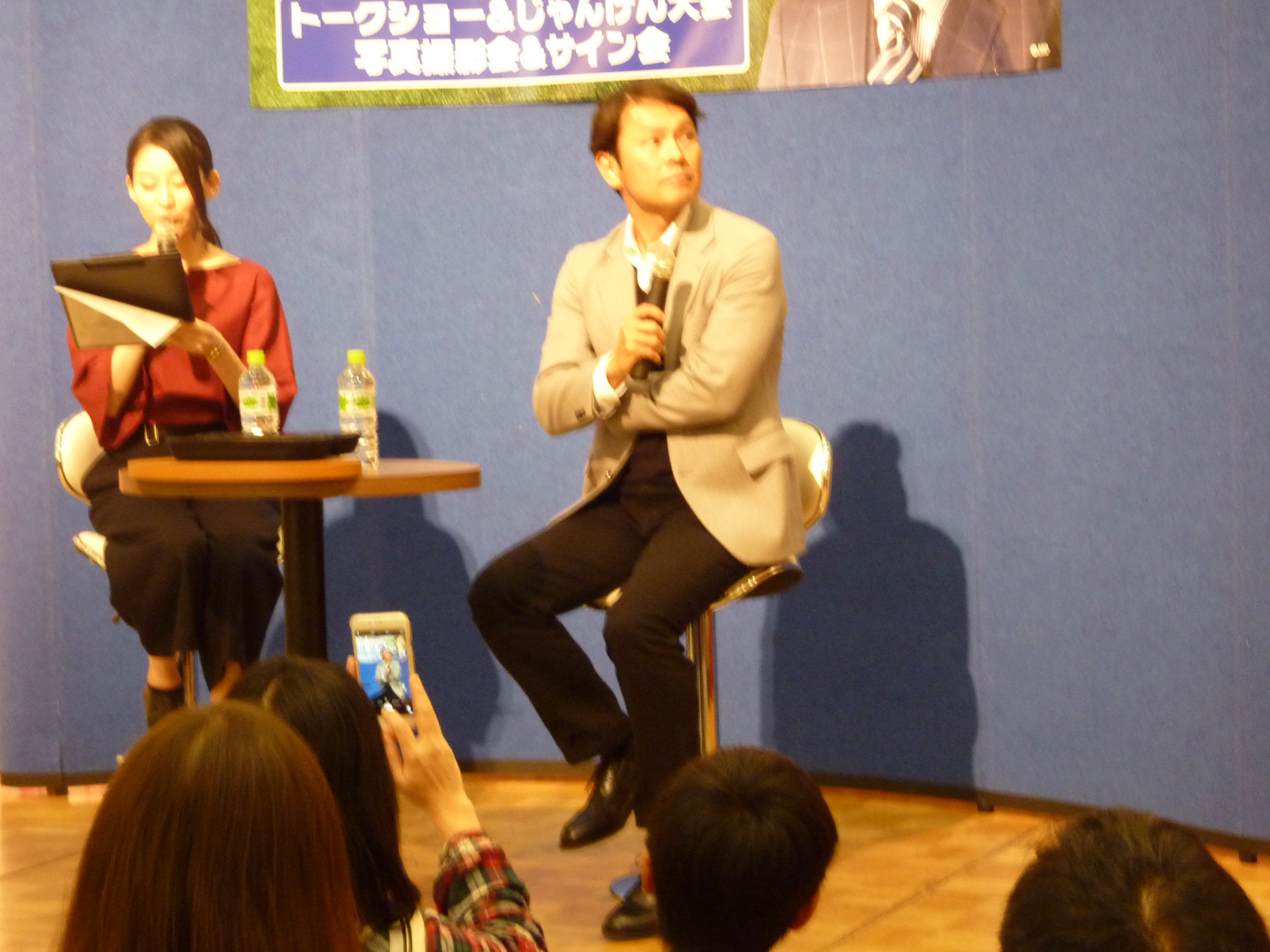

Personal information
- Full name: Masahiro Fukuda
- Date of birth: December 27, 1966 (age 59)
- Place of birth: Yokohama, Kanagawa, Japan
- Height: 1.76 m (5 ft 9 1/2 in)
- Position: Forward

Youth career
- 1982–1984: Sagami Institute of Technology High School

College career
| Years | Team | Apps | (Gls) |
| 1985–1988 | Chuo University | | |

Senior career*
| Years | Team | Apps | (Gls) |
| 1989–2002 | Urawa Red Diamonds | 287 | (143) |
| Total | | 287 | (143) |

International career
| 1990–1995 | Japan | 45 | (9) |
Medal record
Urawa Red Diamonds
| Runner-up | J.League Cup | 2002 |
Representing Japan
AFC Asian Cup
| Gold medal – first place | 1992 Japan |
- * Club domestic league appearances and goals

Masahiro Fukuda (福田 正博, Fukuda Masahiro; born December 27, 1966) is a former Japanese football player. He played for Japan national team. He was normally a forward but sometimes also played in midfield.

== Club career ==
After studying at and playing for Sagami Institute of Technology High School and Chuo University, Fukuda joined Mitsubishi Motors in 1989 and started to play for their football club that played in the Japan Soccer League Division 2. In his rookie season, he scored 36 goals and helped the club to gain the promotion to Division 1.

When Japan's first-ever professional league J1 League started in the early 1990s, Mitsubishi was transferred to the Urawa Red Diamonds. He turned professional and continued to play for the club. He scored his first J1 League goal on June 9, 1993 against the Kashima Antlers at Kashima Soccer Stadium. All the Urawa players except the goalkeeper flocked around Fukuda to celebrate the goal. While the celebration was prolonged, the referee signaled the restart and Kashima's Hisashi Kurosaki equalized immediately.

In the 1995 season, Fukuda scored 32 goals, which made him the League's top scorer and a member of the J.League Best XI. Urawa was fighting the relegation battle in the 1998 season. In order to stay up, Urawa needed to win the last match in the normal 90 minutes. The J1 League employed extra time with the golden goal rule even for a league match at that time, and 2 points were awarded for an extra win while a regulation win earned 3 points. Urawa failed to win in the 90 minutes and the players fielded for the extra time knowing that they had already been relegated. Fukuda scored the golden goal, which fans now remember as the "saddest golden goal in the world."

He retired from the game after the 2002 season. He played his senior club football with one club. He was the symbolic player of Urawa Red Diamonds and the fans refer to him as Mr. Reds. At the beginning of 2003, the testimonial match for Fukuda was held at Saitama Stadium where more than 50,000 supporters attended to bid farewell.

== National team career ==
Fukuda was capped 45 times and scored 9 goals for the Japan national team between 1990 and 1995. His first international appearance came on July 27, 1990 in a Dynasty Cup match against South Korea in Beijing. He scored his first goal for his country on August 24, 1992 in another Dynasty Cup match against China in Beijing.

He was a member of the Japan team that won the 1992 Asian Cup and he played 4 games and scored 1 goal in the semi-final against China.

Under national coach Hans Ooft, Japan reached the 1994 World Cup qualification for the 1994 World Cup. He was on the pitch, after replacing Kenta Hasegawa in the 59th minute, when Japan's hope to play in the finals in the USA was dashed by an injury-time Iraqi equaliser in the last qualifier, the match that the Japanese fans now refer to as the Agony of Doha.

== After retirement ==
He works as a football commentator and columnist for various programs and magazines. He also acquired the S-Class Coaching license that was a prerequisite to manage a J.League club in 2007. He became an assistant coach at Urawa in 2008 and he resigned in 2010.

== Club statistics ==
| Club performance | | | League | | Cup | | League Cup | | Total | |
| Season | Club | League | Apps | Goals | Apps | Goals | Apps | Goals | Apps | Goals |
| Japan | | | League | | Emperor's Cup | | J.League Cup | | Total | |
|---|---|---|---|---|---|---|---|---|---|---|
| 1989/90 | Mitsubishi Motors | JSL Division 2 | 26 | 36 | 0 | 0 | 1 | 0 | 27 | 36 |
| 1990/91 | Mitsubishi Motors | JSL Division 1 | 18 | 7 | 2 | 0 | 0 | 0 | 20 | 7 |
| 1991/92 | Mitsubishi Motors | JSL Division 1 | 15 | 7 | 3 | 2 | 0 | 0 | 18 | 9 |
| 1992 | Urawa Red Diamonds | J1 League | - | | 4 | 2 | 9 | 4 | 13 | 6 |
| 1993 | Urawa Red Diamonds | J1 League | 27 | 4 | 2 | 3 | 0 | 0 | 29 | 7 |
| 1994 | Urawa Red Diamonds | J1 League | 25 | 6 | 3 | 2 | 0 | 0 | 28 | 8 |
| 1995 | Urawa Red Diamonds | J1 League | 50 | 32 | 3 | 2 | - | | 53 | 34 |
| 1996 | Urawa Red Diamonds | J1 League | 4 | 3 | 0 | 0 | 7 | 4 | 11 | 7 |
| 1997 | Urawa Red Diamonds | J1 League | 29 | 21 | 0 | 0 | 8 | 4 | 37 | 25 |
| 1998 | Urawa Red Diamonds | J1 League | 17 | 7 | 3 | 4 | 0 | 0 | 20 | 11 |
| 1999 | Urawa Red Diamonds | J1 League | 23 | 13 | 2 | 1 | 4 | 0 | 29 | 14 |
| 2000 | Urawa Red Diamonds | J2 League | 12 | 2 | 0 | 0 | 0 | 0 | 12 | 2 |
| 2001 | Urawa Red Diamonds | J1 League | 14 | 2 | 4 | 0 | 3 | 0 | 21 | 2 |
| 2002 | Urawa Red Diamonds | J1 League | 27 | 3 | 1 | 0 | 9 | 1 | 37 | 4 |
| Total | | | 287 | 143 | 27 | 16 | 41 | 13 | 355 | 172 |

== National team statistics ==
Japan national team
| Year | Apps | Goals |
|---|---|---|
| 1990 | 5 | 0 |
| 1991 | 2 | 0 |
| 1992 | 8 | 3 |
| 1993 | 15 | 3 |
| 1994 | 0 | 0 |
| 1995 | 15 | 3 |
| Total | 45 | 9 |

== Honors and awards ==
=== Individual honors ===
- J.League Top Scorer: 1995
- J.League Best XI: 1995
- AFC Player of the Month: 1995
- Urawa Red Diamonds Top Scorer: 152

=== Team honors ===
- 1992 Asian Cup (Champions)
