= Kyushu Kyoritsu University =

Coordinates: 33°52′19″N 130°42′18″E

Kyushu Kyoritsu University (九州共立大学, Kyūshū kyōritsu daigaku) is a private university in Kitakyushu, Fukuoka, Japan, established in 1965.
