= Marcelo Trivisonno =

Argentine footballer

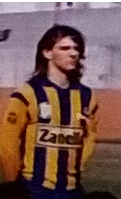

Personal information
- Full name: Marcelo Angel Trivisonno
- Date of birth: 8 June 1966 (age 60)
- Place of birth: Argentina
- Height: 1.82 m (5 ft 11 1/2 in)
- Position: Defender

Senior career*
Years	Team	Apps	(Gls)
1992–1993	Urawa Reds	26	(0)
- * Club domestic league appearances and goals

Marcelo Trivisonno (born 8 June 1966) is a former Argentine football player.

== Career statistics ==
Appearances and goals by club, season and competition
Club	Season	League			Emperor's Cup		J.League Cup		Total	
Club	Season	Division	Apps	Goals	Apps	Goals	Apps	Goals	Apps	Goals
Urawa Reds	1992	J1 League	—		4	0	9	0	13	0
Urawa Reds	1993	J1 League	26	0	0	0	2	0	28	0
Career total			26	0	4	0	11	0	41	0
