= Koichi Hashiratani =

Japanese footballer and manager

Koichi Hashiratani 柱谷 幸一
Personal information
- Full name: Koichi Hashiratani
- Date of birth: 1 March 1961 (age 65)
- Place of birth: Kyoto, Kyoto, Japan
- Height: 1.78 m (5 ft 10 in)
- Position: Forward

Youth career
- 1976–1978: Kyoto Commercial High School
- 1979–1982: Kokushikan University

Senior career*
Years	Team	Apps	(Gls)
1983–1992	Nissan Motors	140	(52)
1992–1994	Urawa Reds	25	(2)
1994–1996	Kashiwa Reysol	72	(7)
Total		237	(61)

International career
1979	Japan U-20	2	(0)
1981–1986	Japan	29	(3)

Managerial career
- 2001–2003: Montedio Yamagata
- 2004–2006: Kyoto Purple Sanga
- 2007–2008: Tochigi SC
- 2013–2016: Giravanz Kitakyushu
Medal record
Nissan Motors
Winner	Japan Soccer League	1988/89
Winner	Japan Soccer League	1989/90
Runner-up	Japan Soccer League	1983
Runner-up	Japan Soccer League	1984
Runner-up	Japan Soccer League	1990/91
Runner-up	Japan Soccer League	1991/92
Winner	JSL Cup	1988
Winner	JSL Cup	1989
Winner	JSL Cup	1990
Runner-up	JSL Cup	1983
Runner-up	JSL Cup	1985
Runner-up	JSL Cup	1986
Winner	Emperor's Cup	1983
Winner	Emperor's Cup	1985
Winner	Emperor's Cup	1988
Winner	Emperor's Cup	1989
Winner	Emperor's Cup	1991
Runner-up	Emperor's Cup	1990
- * Club domestic league appearances and goals

Koichi Hashiratani (柱谷 幸一, Hashiratani Koichi; born 1 March 1961) is a former Japanese football player and manager. He played for Japan national team. His younger brother Tetsuji Hashiratani is also a former footballer.

== Club career ==
Hashiratani was born in Kyoto on 1 March 1961. After graduating from Kokushikan University, he started his senior career with Nissan Motors since 1983 and played with Nissan for 9 seasons until transferred to Urawa Reds in 1992, right before J1 League's inauguration. He experienced another transfer to Kashiwa Reysol, then playing in Japan Football League in June 1994. Kashiwa was promoted to J.League as of the end of 1994 season, and he also made his return to the top flight. After 2 1/2 seasons playing with Kashiwa, he retired as a player.

== National team career ==
In August 1979, when Hashiratani was a Kokushikan University student, he was selected Japan U-20 national team for 1979 World Youth Championship. On 8 February 1981, he debuted for Japan national team against Malaysia. In 1982, he was selected Japan for 1982 Asian Games. He also played at 1984 Summer Olympics qualification and 1986 World Cup qualification. In September 1986, he was selected Japan for 1986 Asian Games. This Game was his last game for Japan. He played 29 games and scored 3 goals for Japan until 1986.

== Coaching career ==
After obtaining J.League's S-grade coach license in 1999, Hashiratani started his coaching career with Montedio Yamagata, where he managed for 3 years from 2001 season to 2003 season. After 6 months of absence, he was named as a manager of Kyoto Purple Sanga in June 2004 when Kyoto was playing in the 2nd division, then contributed to Kyoto's promotion back to the top flight after the 2005 season. However, due to the poor performances and turnouts of the club, he was dismissed on 3 October about 2 months before the end of 2006 season.

He was named as a manager of Tochigi SC playing in Japan Football League in 2007. After two seasons, he made Tochigi eligible to be promoted to J2 League as the club finished 2nd in 2008 season, but was dismissed because he was unable to reach the consent with top managements about his pay, as well as recruiting of new players.

He was named as a General Manager of Urawa in December 2009, but was dismissed due to Urawa's poor performance in 2011 season.

After spending one season as a commentator in 2012, he was named manager of Giravanz Kitakyushu, which had a J2 License. The team was aiming to be promoted to the J1 League in 2017, when a new stadium was to be completed, however, the team was ranked bottom in 2016 J2 League thus relegated to the 2017 J3 League, then Hashiratani resigned, instead.

== Club statistics ==
Club performance			League		Cup		League Cup		Total	
Season	Club	League	Apps	Goals	Apps	Goals	Apps	Goals	Apps	Goals
Japan			League		Emperor's Cup		J.League Cup		Total	
1983	Nissan Motors	JSL Division 1	18	7	5	5	4	2	27	14
1984	Nissan Motors	JSL Division 1	17	8	4	2	0	0	21	10
1985/86	Nissan Motors	JSL Division 1	22	8	5	6	1	0	28	14
1986/87	Nissan Motors	JSL Division 1	22	11	4	1	1	0	27	12
1987/88	Nissan Motors	JSL Division 1	13	3	3	1	1	0	17	4
1988/89	Nissan Motors	JSL Division 1	22	9	5	2	5	1	32	12
1989/90	Nissan Motors	JSL Division 1	11	2	5	1	4	1	20	4
1990/91	Nissan Motors	JSL Division 1	5	0			4	2	9	2
1991/92	Nissan Motors	JSL Division 1	10	4			2	0	12	4
1992	Urawa Reds	J1 League	-		4	4	8	6	12	10
1993	Urawa Reds	J1 League	18	2	1	0	3	0	22	2
1994	Urawa Reds	J1 League	7	0	0	0	0	0	7	0
1994	Kashiwa Reysol	Football League	16	1	0	0	1	0	17	1
1995	Kashiwa Reysol	J1 League	31	4	2	1	-		33	5
1996	Kashiwa Reysol	J1 League	25	2	1	0	13	1	39	3
Total			237	61	39	23	47	13	323	97

== National team statistics ==
Japan national team
Year	Apps	Goals
1981	9	0
1982	3	0
1983	1	0
1984	5	1
1985	9	2
1986	2	0
Total	29	3

== Managerial statistics ==
Team	From	To	Record				
Team	From	To	G	W	D	L	Win %
Montedio Yamagata	2001	2003	132	48	33	51	36.36
Kyoto Purple Sanga	2004	2006	96	48	18	30	50.00
Giravanz Kitakyushu	2013	2016	168	57	40	71	33.93
Total			396	153	91	152	38.64
