= Fukushima FC =

Fukushima F.C.
- Full name: Fukushima F.C.
- Founded: 1951 (as Fukushima Teachers SC)
- Dissolved: 1997
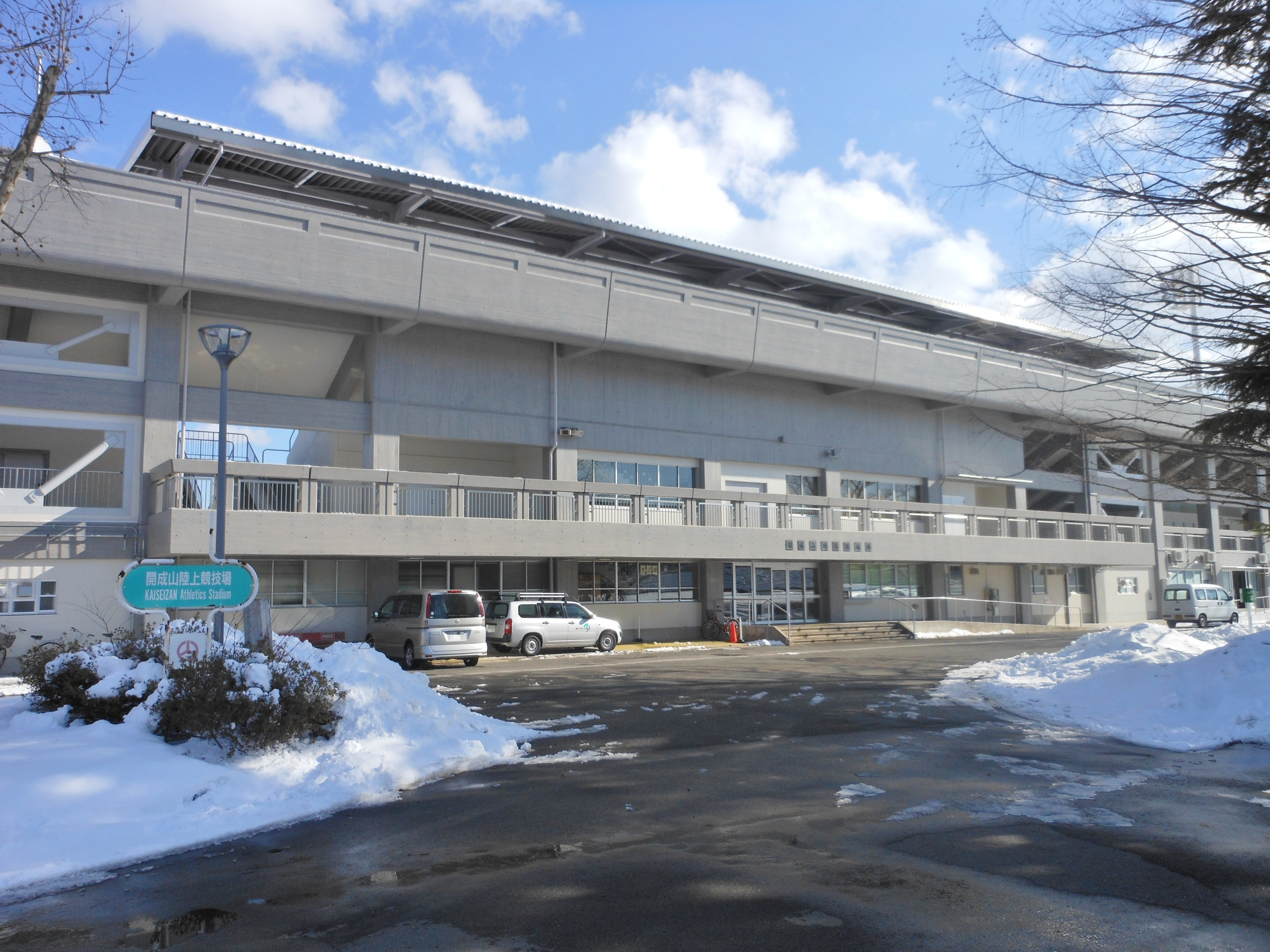
- Ground: Kōriyama Kaiseizan Athletic Stadium; Koriyama, Fukushima, Japan

Fukushima F.C. was a Japanese football club based in Koriyama, Fukushima. The club played in the old Japan Football League in the 1990s.

== Club name ==
- 1951–1981 : Fukushima Teachers SC
- 1982–1997 : Fukushima FC
