= 1996 Japanese Regional Leagues =

Japanese amateur leagues football season

Japanese Regional Leagues
- Season: 1996

Statistics of Japanese Regional Leagues for the 1996 season.

== Champions list ==
Region	Champions
Hokkaido	Hokuden
Tohoku	Sony Sendai
Kanto	Honda Luminozo Sayama
Hokushinetsu	Albireo Niigata
Tokai	Jatco
Kansai	NTT Kansai
Chugoku	Hiroshima Fujita
Shikoku	Teijin
Kyushu	NTT Kyushu

== League standings ==
=== Hokkaido ===
Division 1
Pos	Team	Pld	W	PKW	PKL	L	GF	GA	GD	Pts
1	Hokuden	14	12	1	0	1	70	11	+59	38
2	Sapporo University OB	14	10	1	0	3	47	24	+23	32
3	Sapporo	14	9	0	1	4	52	23	+29	28
4	Nippon Steel Muroran	14	8	0	1	5	45	37	+8	25
5	Ẽfini Sapporo	14	5	1	0	8	32	48	−16	17
6	Nippon Paper Tomakomai	14	4	1	1	8	17	37	−20	15
7	Asahikawa Daisetsu Club	14	2	0	1	11	22	71	−49	7
8	Sapporo First Club	14	1	1	1	11	18	52	−34	6

Source: RSSSF

Division 2
Pos	Team	Pld	W	PKW	PKL	L	GF	GA	GD	Pts
1	Blackpecker Hakodate	7	6	1	0	0	26	8	+18	20
2	BIG 1	7	6	0	0	1	24	9	+15	18
3	JSW Muroran	7	3	2	0	2	18	17	+1	13
4	Otaru Shuyukai	7	3	1	1	2	21	12	+9	12
5	Hakodate Mazda	7	2	0	3	2	12	15	−3	9
6	Kyokushukai	7	1	2	1	3	12	18	−6	8
7	Nippon Oil Muroran	7	1	0	1	5	9	19	−10	4
8	Komazawa University OB	7	0	0	0	7	6	30	−24	0

Source: RSSSF

=== Tohoku ===
Pos	Team	Pld	W	D	L	GF	GA	GD	Pts
1	Sony Sendai	14	11	1	2	47	16	+31	23
2	Akita City Government	14	6	5	3	25	19	+6	17
3	Matsushima	14	5	6	3	28	19	+9	16
4	NEC Tokin	14	6	4	4	23	21	+2	16
5	TDK	14	6	2	6	25	24	+1	14
6	Yamagata	14	2	7	5	14	21	−7	11
7	Morioka Zebra	14	2	6	6	15	30	−15	10
8	Tsuruoka TDK	14	0	5	9	14	41	−27	5

Source: RSSSF
Rules for classification: 2 points for a win; 1 point for a draw; 0 points for a loss.

=== Kanto ===
Pos	Team	Pld	W	D	L	GF	GA	GD	Pts
1	Honda Luminozo Sayama	18	13	4	1	51	22	+29	43
2	Prima Meat Packers	18	12	4	2	58	15	+43	40
3	Kanagawa Teachers	18	10	2	6	33	34	−1	32
4	Yokogawa Electric	18	8	2	8	31	24	+7	26
5	Kuyo	18	6	5	7	28	44	−16	23
6	Saitama Teachers	18	6	2	10	22	30	−8	20
7	Aries Tokyo	18	5	4	9	24	32	−8	19
8	Toho Titanium	18	3	8	7	16	24	−8	17
9	Ome	18	4	5	9	27	36	−9	17
10	Ibaraki Hitachi	18	3	4	11	23	52	−29	13

Source: RSSSF

=== Hokushin'etsu ===
Pos	Team	Pld	W	D	L	GF	GA	GD	Pts
1	Albireo Niigata	9	8	1	0	49	5	+44	25
2	ALO's Hokuriku	9	8	1	0	37	4	+33	25
3	YKK	9	6	1	2	22	11	+11	19
4	Renaiss College	9	4	0	5	14	17	−3	12
5	Yamaga	9	3	2	4	9	19	−10	11
6	Kanazawa	9	3	1	5	15	29	−14	10
7	Fukui Teachers	9	3	0	6	9	24	−15	9
8	Ueda Gentian	9	1	5	3	14	19	−5	8
9	Teihens	9	2	2	5	12	25	−13	8
10	Macky	9	0	1	8	4	32	−28	1

Source: RSSSF

=== Tokai ===
Pos	Team	Pld	W	D	L	GF	GA	GD	Pts
1	Jatco	15	13	1	1	56	13	+43	27
2	Hitachi Shimizu	15	12	3	0	51	14	+37	27
3	Yazaki Valente	15	10	2	3	43	16	+27	22
4	Fujieda City Government	15	10	2	3	40	20	+20	22
5	Maruyasu	15	8	3	4	36	23	+13	19
6	Toyota	15	7	4	4	28	21	+7	18
7	Yamaha Motors	15	7	3	5	36	34	+2	17
8	Nagoya Bank	15	5	6	4	35	30	+5	16
9	Mind House	15	5	3	7	24	29	−5	13
10	Kawasaki Heavy Industries Gifu	15	2	7	6	17	43	−26	11
11	Nagoya	15	3	3	9	24	37	−13	9
12	Toyoda Machine Works	15	3	3	9	17	37	−20	9
13	Toyoda Automatic Loom Works	15	3	3	9	16	38	−22	9
14	Minolta	15	2	4	9	20	39	−19	8
15	Fujitsu Numazu	15	1	5	9	22	38	−16	7
16	Oigawa Government	15	1	4	10	19	52	−33	6

Source: RSSSF
Rules for classification: 2 points for a win; 1 point for a draw; 0 points for a loss.

=== Kansai ===
Pos	Team	Pld	W	D	L	GF	GA	GD	Pts
1	NTT Kansai	18	13	0	5	42	26	+16	39
2	Tanabe Pharmaceuticals	18	10	4	4	37	30	+7	34
3	Osaka Gas	18	10	3	5	41	21	+20	33
4	Sanyo Electric Sumoto	18	9	4	5	47	35	+12	31
5	Osaka University of Health and Sport sciences Club	18	8	6	4	33	25	+8	30
6	Mitsubishi Motors Kyoto	18	8	3	7	36	29	+7	27
7	West Osaka	18	8	2	8	38	28	+10	26
8	Central Kobe	18	5	6	7	31	42	−11	21
9	Takada	18	2	3	13	19	43	−24	9
10	Kyoto Police	18	0	3	15	17	62	−45	3

Source: RSSSF

=== Chugoku ===
Pos	Team	Pld	W	D	L	GF	GA	GD	Pts
1	Hiroshima Fujita	14	10	1	3	46	12	+34	31
2	Mazda	14	8	2	4	42	22	+20	26
3	Mitsubishi Motors Mizushima	14	8	2	4	40	26	+14	26
4	Hiroshima Teachers	14	8	2	4	34	22	+12	26
5	Mitsubishi Oil	14	5	5	4	23	26	−3	20
6	Yamaguchi Teachers	14	3	6	5	17	35	−18	15
7	Ẽfini Hiroshima	14	3	1	10	24	65	−41	10
8	Yamako	14	1	1	12	12	30	−18	4

Source: RSSSF

=== Shikoku ===
Pos	Team	Pld	W	D	L	GF	GA	GD	Pts
1	Teijin	14	13	1	0	43	5	+38	40
2	Kagawa Shiun	14	10	1	3	41	19	+22	31
3	Ehime	14	9	1	4	32	15	+17	28
4	Himawari Milk Nangoku Club	14	5	3	6	24	26	−2	18
5	Otsuka Pharmaceuticals	14	3	5	6	32	33	−1	14
6	Prima Meat Packers	14	4	1	9	25	43	−18	13
7	NTT Shikoku	14	2	3	9	15	37	−22	9
8	Kuroshio	14	2	1	11	15	49	−34	7

Source: RSSSF

=== Kyushu ===
Pos	Team	Pld	W	PKW	PKL	L	GF	GA	GD	Pts
1	NTT Kyushu	16	12	0	1	3	35	10	+25	37
2	Blaze Kumamoto	16	11	1	0	4	44	13	+31	35
3	Volca Kagoshima	16	10	1	1	4	37	18	+19	33
4	Nippon Steel Yawata	16	8	4	1	3	24	11	+13	33
5	Mitsubishi Chemical Kurosaki	16	6	0	3	7	26	29	−3	21
6	Mitsubishi Heavy Industries Nagasaki	16	5	2	1	8	25	35	−10	20
7	Kumamoto Teachers	16	4	1	1	10	17	40	−23	15
8	Fukuoka Dreams	16	3	1	1	11	17	34	−17	12
9	Kyushu Mitsubishi Motors	16	2	1	2	11	16	51	−35	10

Source: RSSSF
