= 1995 Nagoya Grampus Eight season =

Nagoya Grampus Eight
1995 season
- Manager: Arsène Wenger
- Stadium: Nagoya Mizuho Athletics Stadium
- J.League: 3rd
- Emperor's Cup: Champions
- Top goalscorer: League: Stojković (15); All: Takafumi Ogura (19)
- Highest home attendance: 22,573 (vs Júbilo Iwata, 12 August 1995); 36,770 (vs Urawa Red Diamonds, 13 May 1995, Tokyo National Stadium)
- Lowest home attendance: 18,819 (vs Kashiwa Reysol, 5 April 1995); 11,139 (vs Yokohama Flügels, 15 July 1995, Mizuho Rugby Stadium)
- Average home league attendance: 21,463
Home colours	Away colours

1995 Nagoya Grampus Eight season

== Review and events ==
=== League results summary ===
Overall								Home						Away					
Pld	W	D	L	GF	GA	GD	Pts	W	D	L	GF	GA	GD	W	D	L	GF	GA	GD
52	32	0	20	99	82	+17	97	20	0	6	60	33	+27	12	0	14	39	49	−10

Source: J.LEAGUE OFFICIAL RECORD & DATA 1996. ISBN 4-09-102323-1.

=== League results by round ===
J.League Suntory series (first stage)
Round	1	2	3	4	5	6	7	8	9	10	11	12	13	14	15	16	17	18	19	20	21	22	23	24	25	26
Ground	A	A	H	A	H	H	A	A	H	A	H	A	H	H	A	H	A	A	H	H	A	H	A	H	A	H
Result	L	L	L	W	L	L	L	L	W	L	W	L	W	W	L	W	W	W	W	W	W	W	L	W	W	W
Position	14	12	14	12	13	13	13	14	13	14	11	14	11	10	12	12	11	11	9	8	8	8	8	7	6	4

Source: J.LEAGUE OFFICIAL RECORD & DATA 1996. ISBN 4-09-102323-1.
A = Away; H = Home; W = Win; D = Draw; L = Loss

J.League NICOS series (second stage)
Round	1	2	3	4	5	6	7	8	9	10	11	12	13	14	15	16	17	18	19	20	21	22	23	24	25	26
Ground	H	A	H	H	A	H	A	A	H	H	A	H	A	H	A	A	H	A	H	H	A	A	H	A	H	A
Result	W	W	W	W	L	W	L	W	L	W	W	W	L	W	W	W	L	L	W	W	L	W	L	W	W	L
Position	2	1	1	1	1	1	3	3	5	3	2	2	4	3	3	3	3	3	2	2	2	2	2	2	2	2

Source: J.LEAGUE OFFICIAL RECORD & DATA 1996. ISBN 4-09-102323-1.
A = Away; H = Home; W = Win; D = Draw; L = Loss

== Competitions ==
Competitions	Position
J.League	3rd / 14 clubs
Emperor's Cup	Champions

== Domestic results ==
=== J.League ===
18 March 1995 1st-1	Gamba Osaka	3–1	Nagoya Grampus Eight	Expo '70 Commemorative Stadium
15:02 JST (UTC+09)	Yamaguchi 45'; Protassov 72'; Isogai 75'	J. League	Stojković 53'	Attendance: 14,007; Referee: Juan Carlos Crespi; Assistant referees: Yoshikazu Hiroshima, Takashi Kunori; Fourth official: Tsuyoshi Miyake

22 March 1995 1st-2	Cerezo Osaka	2–2 (V-goal) (a.e.t.) (4–3 p)	Nagoya Grampus Eight	Osaka Nagai No.2 Stadium
19:04 JST (UTC+09)	Kizawa 9'; Valdés 75'	J. League	Moriyama 1'; Ogura 69'	Attendance: 9,239; Referee: Yoshitsugu Katayama; Assistant referees: Yasuhiro Hemmi, Akio Okutani; Fourth official: Kazuo Kakihana
	Penalties
	(penalty scored) Marquinhos; (penalty missed) Valdés; (penalty scored) Yamahashi; (penalty scored) Kanda; (penalty missed) Murata; (penalty scored) Kizawa		(penalty scored) Durix; (penalty missed) Torres; (penalty scored) Yonekura; (penalty scored) Moriyama; (penalty missed) Asano; (penalty missed) Ogura

25 March 1995 1st-3	Nagoya Grampus Eight	2–6	Júbilo Iwata	Nagoya Mizuho Athletics Stadium
15:03 JST (UTC+09)	Yonekura 35'; Durix 70'	J. League	Vanenburg 5' (pen.); Schillaci 44', 85'; Nakayama 54', 72'; Fujita 73'	Attendance: 20,660; Referee: Fumikazu Shioyazono; Assistant referees: Hideaki Harada, Takuji Fukazawa; Fourth official: Noriaki Fukunaga

29 March 1995 1st-4	Urawa Red Diamonds	0–0 (V-goal) (a.e.t.) (9–10 p)	Nagoya Grampus Eight	Tokyo National Stadium
19:04 JST (UTC+09)		J. League		Attendance: 44,464; Referee: Kiyoshi Ōta; Assistant referees: Takeshi Ōkura, Tetsu Karakida; Fourth official: Noritake Sakurada; Man of the Match: Yūji Itō
	Penalties
	(penalty scored) Fukuda; (penalty scored) Taguchi; (penalty missed) Buchwald; (penalty missed) Tsuchihashi; (penalty scored) Yamada; (penalty scored) Hori; (penalty scored) Hirose; (penalty scored) Sugiyama; (penalty missed) Okano; (penalty missed) F. Ikeda; (penalty scored) Tsuchida; (penalty scored) Fukuda; (penalty scored) Taguchi; (penalty missed) Buchwald		(penalty scored) Durix; (penalty missed) Passi; (penalty scored) Torres; (penalty scored) Moriyama; (penalty missed) Asano; (penalty scored) Iijima; (penalty scored) Nakanishi; (penalty scored) Sakakura; (penalty missed) Hirano; (penalty missed) Katō; (penalty scored) Y. Itō; (penalty scored) Durix; (penalty scored) Passi; (penalty scored) Torres

1 April 1995 1st-5	Nagoya Grampus Eight	0–1 (V-goal) (a.e.t.)	Bellmare Hiratsuka	Nagoya Mizuho Athletics Stadium
14:03 JST (UTC+09)		J. League	Sorimachi 109'	Attendance: 20,509; Referee: Tatsumi Ōno; Assistant referees: Masahiro Katagiri, Yasuhiro Hemmi; Fourth official: Tsuyoshi Ogura

5 April 1995 1st-6	Nagoya Grampus Eight	1–4	Kashiwa Reysol	Nagoya Mizuho Athletics Stadium
19:01 JST (UTC+09)	Okayama 76'	J. League	Müller 6'; N. Katō 65', 89'; Careca 87'	Attendance: 18,819; Referee: Juan Carlos Crespi; Assistant referees: Kazuhisa Osada, Naoyuki Mori; Fourth official: Takao Wakahara

8 April 1995 1st-7	Yokohama Marinos	2–0	Nagoya Grampus Eight	Yokohama Mitsuzawa Football Stadium
15:00 JST (UTC+09)	T. Yamada 9', 58'	J. League		Attendance: 13,254; Referee: Naotsugu Fuse; Assistant referees: Mitsuru Satō, Satoru Ishizawa; Fourth official: Hiroshi Yamaguchi

12 April 1995 1st-8	Sanfrecce Hiroshima	4–0	Nagoya Grampus Eight	Hiroshima Stadium
19:01 JST (UTC+09)	Hašek 43', 77' (pen.), 84'; Mori 61'	J. League		Attendance: 7,012; Referee: Hideo Kikuchi; Assistant referees: Hideaki Harada, Kōji Minami; Fourth official: Shinji Saga

15 April 1995 1st-9	Nagoya Grampus Eight	2–0	Shimizu S-Pulse	Nagoya Mizuho Athletics Stadium
15:05 JST (UTC+09)	Mori 3'; Stojković 80'	J. League		Attendance: 20,548; Referee: Armando Perez; Assistant referees: Noboru Ishiyama, Yasushi Tsuchimoto; Fourth official: Naoto Kuwahara; Man of the Match: Passi

22 April 1995 1st-10	Kashima Antlers	4–0	Nagoya Grampus Eight	Kashima Soccer Stadium
15:04 JST (UTC+09)	Hasegawa 4'; Kurosaki 17', 27'; Jorginho 89'	J. League		Attendance: 15,273; Referee: Yōtarō Moritsu; Assistant referees: Kazuaki Hamaguchi, Toshimitsu Yoshida; Fourth official: Shigemi Tominaga

26 April 1995 1st-11	Nagoya Grampus Eight	4–3 (V-goal) (a.e.t.)	Verdy Kawasaki	Nagoya Mizuho Athletics Stadium
19:03 JST (UTC+09)	Mori 15'; Passi 35'; Hirano 56'; Moriyama 95'	J. League	Fujiyoshi 54'; Pereira 73' (pen.); Bismarck 82'	Attendance: 21,557; Referee: Fumikazu Shioyazono; Assistant referees: Kazuya Yanagisawa, Akio Okutani; Fourth official: Toshiya Narita; Man of the Match: Takashi Hirano

29 April 1995 1st-12	Yokohama Flügels	4–3	Nagoya Grampus Eight	Yokohama Mitsuzawa Football Stadium
15:00 JST (UTC+09)	Yoshida 19'; Watanabe 63'; Evair 69'; Zinho 83'	J. League	Ogura 37'; Asano 41'; Kosugi 88'	Attendance: 13,381; Referee: Naotsugu Fuse; Assistant referees: Kazuaki Hamaguchi, Kenichi Koshiyama; Fourth official: Kazuhiko Uchida

3 May 1995 1st-13	Nagoya Grampus Eight	2–2 (V-goal) (a.e.t.) (4–3 p)	JEF United Ichihara	Gifu Nagaragawa Stadium
15:03 JST (UTC+09)	Torres 4'; Hirano 21'	J. League	Maslovar 30'; Nakanishi 88'	Attendance: 20,293; Referee: Tatsumi Ōno; Assistant referees: Morihisa Yamaguchi, Mikio Fukuoka; Fourth official: Toyotaka Ogawa; Man of the Match: Stojković
	Penalties
	(penalty scored) Durix; (penalty missed) Torres; (penalty scored) Iijima; (penalty missed) Moriyama; (penalty scored) Stojković; (penalty scored) Nakanishi		(penalty missed) Rufer; (penalty missed) Jō; (penalty scored) Ejiri; (penalty scored) Y. Gotō; (penalty scored) Maslovar; (penalty missed) M. Miyazawa

6 May 1995 1st-14	Nagoya Grampus Eight	6–0	Cerezo Osaka	Nagoya Mizuho Athletics Stadium
15:02 JST (UTC+09)	Hirano 28'; Passi 57'; Ogura 64'; Stojković 74'; Okayama 82'; Moriyama 83'	J. League		Attendance: 20,775; Referee: Lutz Fröhlich; Assistant referees: Noboru Ishiyama, Takuji Fukazawa; Fourth official: Tsutomu Suda; Man of the Match: Passi

10 May 1995 1st-15	Júbilo Iwata	1–0	Nagoya Grampus Eight	Júbilo Iwata Stadium
18:59 JST (UTC+09)	Fujita 71'	J. League		Attendance: 14,291; Referee: Masayoshi Okada; Assistant referees: Tetsu Karakida, Yasushi Tsuchimoto; Fourth official: Takuya Okada

13 May 1995 1st-16	Nagoya Grampus Eight	2–2 (V-goal) (a.e.t.) (7–6 p)	Urawa Red Diamonds	Tokyo National Stadium
16:03 JST (UTC+09)	Stojković 50', 82' (pen.)	J. League	Fukuda 68' (pen.); Taguchi 74'	Attendance: 36,770; Referee: Juan Carlos Crespi; Assistant referees: Kazuya Yanagisawa, Ichirō Inukai; Fourth official: Tsutomu Anazawa; Man of the Match: Stojković
	Penalties
	(penalty scored) Durix; (penalty scored) Stojković; (penalty scored) Iijima; (penalty missed) Okayama; (penalty scored) Yonekura; (penalty scored) Asano; (penalty scored) Ogawa; (penalty scored) Mori		(penalty scored) Fukuda; (penalty scored) Buchwald; (penalty scored) Hirose; (penalty missed) Sugiyama; (penalty scored) Yamada; (penalty scored) N. Ikeda; (penalty scored) Okano; (penalty missed) Tsuchihashi

17 June 1995 1st-17	Bellmare Hiratsuka	3–4 (V-goal) (a.e.t.)	Nagoya Grampus Eight	Hiratsuka Stadium
18:33 JST (UTC+09)	Almir 8', 37'; T. Iwamoto 43'	J. League	Okayama 10'; Stojković 22'; Hirano 48'; Torres 116'	Attendance: 14,163; Referee: Yōtarō Moritsu; Assistant referees: Hiroshi Fukuda, Masato Nogami; Fourth official: Susumu Takeda; Man of the Match: Takashi Hirano

21 June 1995 1st-18	Kashiwa Reysol	0–1	Nagoya Grampus Eight	Kashiwa Hitachi Stadium
19:00 JST (UTC+09)		J. League	Okayama 50'	Attendance: 11,388; Referee: Hideo Kikuchi; Assistant referees: Toshiyuki Mayuzumi, Kōji Minami; Fourth official: Terunobu Kakinuma; Man of the Match: Stojković

24 June 1995 1st-19	Nagoya Grampus Eight	3–2	Yokohama Marinos	Gifu Nagaragawa Stadium
19:03 JST (UTC+09)	Durix 39'; Okayama 53'; Yonekura 77'	J. League	T. Suzuki 55'; T. Yamada 63'	Attendance: 24,071; Referee: Hiroyuki Umemoto; Assistant referees: Sōichirō Kaneko, Satoru Kawano; Fourth official: Takahiko Sugiyama; Man of the Match: Durix

28 June 1995 1st-20	Nagoya Grampus Eight	2–1 (V-goal) (a.e.t.)	Sanfrecce Hiroshima	Nagoya Mizuho Athletics Stadium
19:00 JST (UTC+09)	Yonekura 70'; Moriyama 118'	J. League	Michiki 1'	Attendance: 19,616; Referee: Masayoshi Okada; Assistant referees: Masahiro Katagiri, Tōru Yamashiro; Fourth official: Yukio Fujita; Man of the Match: Makoto Yonekura

1 July 1995 1st-21	Shimizu S-Pulse	1–2	Nagoya Grampus Eight	Nihondaira Sports Stadium
19:01 JST (UTC+09)	Toninho 54'	J. League	Torres 53'; Hirano 80'	Attendance: 18,917; Referee: Kiyoshi Ōta; Assistant referees: Kimio Izaki, Toshimitsu Yoshida; Fourth official: Naoki Uchiyama; Man of the Match: Torres

8 July 1995 1st-22	Nagoya Grampus Eight	2–0	Kashima Antlers	Nagoya Mizuho Athletics Stadium
18:30 JST (UTC+09)	Stojković 81'; Moriyama 84'	J. League		Attendance: 21,794; Referee: Yoshitsugu Katayama; Assistant referees: Morihisa Yamaguchi, Yasushi Tsuchimoto; Fourth official: Yūji Kōda; Man of the Match: Gō Ōiwa

12 July 1995 1st-23	Verdy Kawasaki	2–1 (V-goal) (a.e.t.)	Nagoya Grampus Eight	Kawasaki Todoroki Stadium
19:01 JST (UTC+09)	Takeda 31'; Fujiyoshi 107'	J. League	Torres 36'	Attendance: 12,035; Referee: Armando Perez; Assistant referees: Masato Nogami, Akihisa Makino; Fourth official: Mineo Takada

15 July 1995 1st-24	Nagoya Grampus Eight	2–1	Yokohama Flügels	Mizuho Rugby Stadium
18:32 JST (UTC+09)	Durix 54'; Moriyama 58'	J. League	Kaetsu 78'	Attendance: 11,139; Referee: Shinichirō Obata; Assistant referees: Naoyuki Mori, Takuji Fukazawa; Fourth official: Yukiyoshi Miyashita; Man of the Match: Durix

19 July 1995 1st-25	JEF United Ichihara	0–5	Nagoya Grampus Eight	Ichihara Stadium
19:03 JST (UTC+09)		J. League	Durix 44' (pen.); Moriyama 66', 72', 74'; Okayama 79'	Attendance: 13,865; Referee: Juan Carlos Crespi; Assistant referees: Kimio Izaki, Tetsu Karakida; Fourth official: Eita Horikawa; Man of the Match: Yasuyuki Moriyama

22 July 1995 1st-26	Nagoya Grampus Eight	3–0	Gamba Osaka	Nagoya Mizuho Athletics Stadium
19:01 JST (UTC+09)	Hirano 32'; Nakanishi 83'; Okayama 85'	J. League		Attendance: 21,816; Referee: Yōtarō Moritsu; Assistant referees: Morihisa Yamaguchi, Satoru Kawano; Fourth official: Akihiko Kakei; Man of the Match: Durix

12 August 1995 2nd-1	Nagoya Grampus Eight	4–0	Júbilo Iwata	Nagoya Mizuho Athletics Stadium
19:03 JST (UTC+09)	Okayama 13'; Ogura 27'; Stojković 61'; Durix 87'	J. League		Attendance: 22,573; Referee: Yoshitsugu Katayama; Assistant referees: Takeshi Ōkura, Kimio Izaki; Fourth official: Yukio Fujita; Man of the Match: Stojković

16 August 1995 2nd-2	JEF United Ichihara	2–3	Nagoya Grampus Eight	Ichihara Stadium
19:02 JST (UTC+09)	Niimura 40'; Jō 53'	J. League	Durix 21'; Ogura 22'; Nakanishi 89'	Attendance: 12,584; Referee: Keiichi Sunakawa; Assistant referees: Kenichi Koshiyama, Toshimitsu Yoshida; Fourth official: Terunobu Kakinuma; Man of the Match: Durix

19 August 1995 2nd-3	Nagoya Grampus Eight	3–1	Gamba Osaka	Gifu Nagaragawa Stadium
19:03 JST (UTC+09)	Ogura 11'; Asano 35'; Nakanishi 79'	J. League	Tsveiba 36'	Attendance: 21,734; Referee: Alfredo Trentalange; Assistant referees: Yasuhiro Matsuzaki, Naoyuki Mori; Fourth official: Katsuyasu Masui; Man of the Match: Stojković

23 August 1995 2nd-4	Nagoya Grampus Eight	2–1	Kashima Antlers	Nagoya Mizuho Athletics Stadium
19:00 JST (UTC+09)	Durix 21'; Nakanishi 63'	J. League	Masuda 68'	Attendance: 22,028; Referee: Naotsugu Fuse; Assistant referees: Tōru Yamashiro, Akio Okutani; Fourth official: N. Yoshida (吉田 文久); Man of the Match: Tetsuya Okayama

26 August 1995 2nd-5	Verdy Kawasaki	3–2	Nagoya Grampus Eight	Kawasaki Todoroki Stadium
19:03 JST (UTC+09)	Alcindo 37'; Takeda 70'; Bismarck 89'	J. League	Ogura 12'; Moriyama 85'	Attendance: 15,503; Referee: Kenji Tanaka; Assistant referees: Mitsuru Satō, Tetsu Karakida; Fourth official: Tatsuo Kamekura

2 September 1995 2nd-6	Nagoya Grampus Eight	2–1 (V-goal) (a.e.t.)	Yokohama Flügels	Gifu Nagaragawa Stadium
18:30 JST (UTC+09)	Stojković 22'; Durix 92'	J. League	Harada 26'	Attendance: 22,024; Referee: Masayoshi Okada; Assistant referees: Kazuya Yanagisawa, Ichirō Inukai; Fourth official: Tatsuo Gotō; Man of the Match: Durix

6 September 1995 2nd-7	Shimizu S-Pulse	2–0	Nagoya Grampus Eight	Nihondaira Sports Stadium
19:02 JST (UTC+09)	Massaro 14'; T. Itō 89'	J. League		Attendance: 17,005; Referee: Fumikazu Shioyazono; Assistant referees: Naoyuki Mori, Kōji Minami; Fourth official: Masakazu Hōjō

9 September 1995 2nd-8	Kashiwa Reysol	1–2	Nagoya Grampus Eight	Kashiwa Hitachi Stadium
19:03 JST (UTC+09)	Sugano 89'	J. League	31' (o.g.); Torres 70'	Attendance: 14,152; Referee: Armando Perez; Assistant referees: Satoru Ishizawa, Masato Nogami; Fourth official: Katsuhiko Takayama; Man of the Match: Torres

13 September 1995 2nd-9	Nagoya Grampus Eight	0–1	Cerezo Osaka	Nagoya Mizuho Athletics Stadium
19:00 JST (UTC+09)		J. League	89' (o.g.)	Attendance: 21,485; Referee: Hiroyuki Umemoto; Assistant referees: Sōichirō Kaneko, Tōru Kamikawa; Fourth official: Tsutomu Suda

16 September 1995 2nd-10	Nagoya Grampus Eight	1–0	Sanfrecce Hiroshima	Nagoya Mizuho Athletics Stadium
19:05 JST (UTC+09)	Passi 37'	J. League		Attendance: 19,735; Referee: Kenji Tanaka; Assistant referees: Morihisa Yamaguchi, Mitsuyoshi Nakaguma; Fourth official: Takao Wakahara; Man of the Match: Seiichi Ogawa

23 September 1995 2nd-11	Urawa Red Diamonds	1–2	Nagoya Grampus Eight	Urawa Komaba Stadium
15:01 JST (UTC+09)	Fukuda 42' (pen.)	J. League	Okayama 2'; Durix 35' (pen.)	Attendance: 21,101; Referee: Alfredo Trentalange; Assistant referees: Toshiyuki Mayuzumi, Toshimitsu Yoshida; Fourth official: Akio Hayashi; Man of the Match: Tetsuya Okayama

27 September 1995 2nd-12	Nagoya Grampus Eight	4–0	Bellmare Hiratsuka	Nagoya Mizuho Athletics Stadium
19:00 JST (UTC+09)	Durix 12'; Hirano 26'; Ogura 36', 69'	J. League		Attendance: 21,135; Referee: Zoran Petrović; Assistant referees: Tōru Yamashiro, Ichirō Inukai; Fourth official: Eiji Murakami; Man of the Match: Takafumi Ogura

30 September 1995 2nd-13	Yokohama Marinos	5–0	Nagoya Grampus Eight	Yokohama Mitsuzawa Football Stadium
15:03 JST (UTC+09)	Matsuda 3'; Bisconti 9', 61'; Medina Bello 10', 63'	J. League		Attendance: 12,591; Referee: Armando Perez; Assistant referees: Hiroshi Fukuda, Kō Ōishi; Fourth official: Toshiya Kumagai

4 October 1995 2nd-14	Nagoya Grampus Eight	5–0	JEF United Ichihara	Nagoya Mizuho Athletics Stadium
19:00 JST (UTC+09)	Ogura 18', 83'; Stojković 67', 72'; Hirayama 81'	J. League		Attendance: 21,174; Referee: Hiroyuki Umemoto; Assistant referees: Yoshikazu Hiroshima, Takuji Fukazawa; Fourth official: Hisao Sugata; Man of the Match: Stojković

7 October 1995 2nd-15	Gamba Osaka	1–2 (V-goal) (a.e.t.)	Nagoya Grampus Eight	Saga Stadium
17:00 JST (UTC+09)	Isogai 43' (pen.)	J. League	Stojković 39' (pen.); Okayama 94'	Attendance: 8,008; Referee: Tatsumi Ōno; Assistant referees: Hideaki Harada, Tōru Yamashiro; Fourth official: Kōki Ōba; Man of the Match: Kei Taniguchi

14 October 1995 2nd-16	Kashima Antlers	1–3	Nagoya Grampus Eight	Tokyo National Stadium
15:03 JST (UTC+09)	86' (o.g.)	J. League	Stojković 66'; Hirano 77'; Moriyama 81'	Attendance: 50,093; Referee: Tatsumi Ōno; Assistant referees: Kazuya Yanagisawa, Naoyuki Mori; Fourth official: Yoshikazu Ozaki; Man of the Match: Stojković

18 October 1995 2nd-17	Nagoya Grampus Eight	0–1	Verdy Kawasaki	Gifu Nagaragawa Stadium
19:03 JST (UTC+09)		J. League	Alcindo 34'	Attendance: 22,293; Referee: Zoran Petrović; Assistant referees: Yasushi Tsuchimoto, Kōji Taniuchi; Fourth official: Tatsuo Gotō

21 October 1995 2nd-18	Yokohama Flügels	2–0	Nagoya Grampus Eight	Yokohama Mitsuzawa Football Stadium
15:00 JST (UTC+09)	Miura 45'; Evair 89'	J. League		Attendance: 13,232; Referee: Yoshitsugu Katayama; Assistant referees: Yū Nakamura, Tōru Kamikawa; Fourth official: Mitsune Yamaguchi

1 November 1995 2nd-19	Nagoya Grampus Eight	2–1	Shimizu S-Pulse	Nagoya Mizuho Athletics Stadium
19:05 JST (UTC+09)	Asano 61'; Ogura 70'	J. League	Sawanobori 17' (pen.)	Attendance: 22,329; Referee: Masayoshi Okada; Assistant referees: Yoshikazu Hiroshima, Hiroyuki Izumi; Fourth official: Kazuo Koyake; Man of the Match: Tetsuya Asano

4 November 1995 2nd-20	Nagoya Grampus Eight	3–1	Kashiwa Reysol	Nagoya Mizuho Athletics Stadium
15:33 JST (UTC+09)	Moriyama 64', 69'; Stojković 82' (pen.)	J. League	Careca 44'	Attendance: 19,484; Referee: Yōtarō Moritsu; Assistant referees: Yasuhiro Hemmi, Naoki Esumi; Fourth official: Takahiro Murakami; Man of the Match: Yasuyuki Moriyama

8 November 1995 2nd-21	Cerezo Osaka	1–0	Nagoya Grampus Eight	Osaka Nagai No.2 Stadium
19:01 JST (UTC+09)	Marquinhos 69'	J. League		Attendance: 10,181; Referee: Armando Perez; Assistant referees: Morihisa Yamaguchi, Takuji Fukazawa; Fourth official: Sōichirō Kaneko

11 November 1995 2nd-22	Sanfrecce Hiroshima	0–2	Nagoya Grampus Eight	Hiroshima Big Arch
14:03 JST (UTC+09)		J. League	Asano 27'; Ogura 57'	Attendance: 12,170; Referee: Tetsuya Hamana; Assistant referees: Hideaki Harada, Hiroyuki Izumi; Fourth official: Satoshi Hanashige; Man of the Match: Tetsuya Asano

15 November 1995 2nd-23	Nagoya Grampus Eight	2–4	Urawa Red Diamonds	Nagoya Mizuho Athletics Stadium
19:05 JST (UTC+09)	Stojković 15'; Ogura 48'	J. League	Fukuda 27', 84'; Nakashima 53'; Bein 65'	Attendance: 21,579; Referee: Yoshitsugu Katayama; Assistant referees: Kazuaki Hamaguchi, Kōji Taniuchi; Fourth official: Tsutomu Sugiura

18 November 1995 2nd-24	Bellmare Hiratsuka	2–3 (V-goal) (a.e.t.)	Nagoya Grampus Eight	Hiratsuka Stadium
15:00 JST (UTC+09)	Nishiyama 34', 62'	J. League	Hirano 10'; Nakanishi 68'; Torres 90'	Attendance: 11,953; Referee: Yoshimi Ogawa; Assistant referees: Hideaki Harada, Ichirō Inukai; Fourth official: Sakae Ikeda; Man of the Match: Torres

22 November 1995 2nd-25	Nagoya Grampus Eight	1–0	Yokohama Marinos	Nagoya Mizuho Athletics Stadium
19:02 JST (UTC+09)	Moriyama 71'	J. League		Attendance: 22,092; Referee: Kazuo Kakihana; Assistant referees: Sōichirō Kaneko, Kōji Minami; Fourth official: Motoyoshi Matsumoto; Man of the Match: Torres

25 November 1995 2nd-26	Júbilo Iwata	2–1 (V-goal) (a.e.t.)	Nagoya Grampus Eight	Júbilo Iwata Stadium
15:03 JST (UTC+09)	M. Suzuki 42' 106'	J. League	Nakanishi 1'	Attendance: 17,672; Referee: Yōtarō Moritsu; Assistant referees: Takashi Kunori, Mikio Fukuoka; Fourth official: Takuya Okada

=== Emperor's Cup ===
3 December 1995 1st Round	Kyoto Purple Sanga	1–2	Nagoya Grampus Eight	Nagoya Mizuho Athletics Stadium
: JST (UTC+09)	Satō ?'		Mori ?'; Ogura ?'	Attendance: 20,285

10 December 1995 2nd Round	Yokohama Flügels	1–4	Nagoya Grampus Eight	Miyagi Athletic Stadium
: JST (UTC+09)	Zinho ?'		Asano ?'; Okayama ?'; Stojković ?'; Hirano ?'	Attendance: 8,729

17 December 1995 Quarterfinals	Vissel Kobe	0–2	Nagoya Grampus Eight	Gifu Nagaragawa Stadium
: JST (UTC+09)			Stojković ?'; Asano ?'	Attendance: 20,461

23 December 1995 Semifinals	Kashima Antlers	1–5	Nagoya Grampus Eight	Tokyo National Stadium
: JST (UTC+09)	Hasegawa 42'		Ogura 18', 32'; Asano 54'; Okayama 66'; Durix 85'	Attendance: 34,803

1 January 1996 Final	Nagoya Grampus Eight	3–0	Sanfrecce Hiroshima	Tokyo National Stadium
: JST (UTC+09)	Ogura ?', ?'; Hirano ?'			Attendance: 47,021

== Player statistics ==
No.	Pos	Nat	Player	Total		J-League		Emperor's Cup	
No.	Pos	Nat	Player	Apps	Goals	Apps	Goals	Apps	Goals
	GK	(Japan) JPN	Yūji Itō	52	0	49	0	3	0
	GK	(Japan) JPN	Akira Kawaguchi	2	0	2	0	0	0
	GK	(Japan) JPN	Ken Ishikawa	4	0	2	0	2	0
	GK	(Japan) JPN	Hiroki Mizuhara	1	0	1	0	0	0
	DF	(Brazil) BRA	Torres	40	6	36	6	4	0
	DF	(Japan) JPN	Yūji Sakakura	18	0	18	0	0	0
	DF	(Japan) JPN	Toshiyuki Kosugi	7	1	7	1	0	0
	DF	(Japan) JPN	Kazuhisa Iijima	50	0	45	0	5	0
	DF	(Japan) JPN	Seiichi Ogawa	38	0	33	0	5	0
	DF	(Japan) JPN	Naoki Mori	19	3	15	2	4	1
	DF	(Japan) JPN	Masaru Hirayama	17	1	16	1	1	0
	DF	(Japan) JPN	Gō Ōiwa	42	0	38	0	4	0
	DF	(Japan) JPN	Seiji Kami	0	0	0	0	0	0
	DF	(Japan) JPN	Otohiko Kiyono	0	0	0	0	0	0
	DF	(Japan) JPN	Seiji Kubo	0	0	0	0	0	0
	DF	(Japan) JPN	Kei Taniguchi	7	0	7	0	0	0
	DF	(Japan) JPN	Mitsutoshi Tsushima	27	0	27	0	0	0
	DF	(Japan) JPN	Yasuaki Katō	5	0	5	0	0	0
	DF	(Japan) JPN	Mitsuru Mukōjima	0	0	0	0	0	0
	MF	(Japan) JPN	Shigeo Sawairi	0	0	0	0	0	0
	MF	(France) FRA	Gérald Passi	25	3	25	3	0	0
	MF	(Federal Republic of Yugoslavia) YUG	Dragan Stojković	45	17	40	15	5	2
	MF	(France) FRA	Franck Durix	53	11	48	10	5	1
	MF	(Japan) JPN	Tetsuya Asano	55	7	50	4	5	3
	MF	(Japan) JPN	Tetsuo Nakanishi	38	6	33	6	5	0
	MF	(Japan) JPN	Hiroto Takahashi	0	0	0	0	0	0
	MF	(Japan) JPN	Makoto Yonekura	39	3	39	3	0	0
	MF	(Japan) JPN	Masashi Shimamura	0	0	0	0	0	0
	MF	(Japan) JPN	Junji Kawabata	0	0	0	0	0	0
	MF	(Japan) JPN	Toshihiro Uchida	1	0	1	0	0	0
	MF	(Japan) JPN	Hiroyasu Ibata	0	0	0	0	0	0
	MF	(Japan) JPN	Takashi Hirano	55	11	50	9	5	2
	MF	(Japan) JPN	Tetsuhiro Kina	5	0	5	0	0	0
	FW	(Japan) JPN	Yasuyuki Moriyama	46	14	42	14	4	0
	FW	(Japan) JPN	Tarō Gotō	0	0	0	0	0	0
	FW	(Japan) JPN	Takafumi Ogura	42	19	37	14	5	5
	FW	(Japan) JPN	Tetsuya Okayama	45	12	40	10	5	2
	FW	(Japan) JPN	Takaki Kanda	0	0	0	0	0	0
	GK	(Japan) JPN	Seiji Honda †	0	0	0	0	0	0
	MF	(Japan) JPN	伊藤 亘 †	0	0	0	0	0	0
	MF	(Japan) JPN	Tomoya Yamagami †	0	0	0	0	0	0

- † player(s) joined the team after the opening of this season.

== Transfers ==
In:

No.	Pos.	Nation	Player
—	GK	JPN	Akira Kawaguchi (from Sanfrecce Hiroshima)
—	DF	BRA	Carlos Alexandre Torres (from Vasco da Gama)
—	DF	JPN	Yūji Sakakura (from JEF United Ichihara)
—	DF	JPN	Masaru Hirayama (from Chuo University)
—	DF	JPN	Gō Ōiwa (from University of Tsukuba)
—	DF	JPN	Seiji Kami (from Sendai College)
—	DF	JPN	Yasuaki Katō (from Shimizu Commercial High School)
—	DF	JPN	Mitsuru Mukōjima (from Shizuoka Gakuen Senior High School)
—	MF	FRA	Gérald Passi (from Saint-Étienne)
—	MF	JPN	Tetsuya Asano (loan return from Urawa Red Diamonds)
—	MF	JPN	Hiroto Takahashi (from FC Niederau)
—	MF	JPN	Toshihiro Uchida (from Meiji University)
—	MF	JPN	Tetsuhiro Kina (from Naha Nishi High School)

Out:

No.	Pos.	Nation	Player
—	GK	JPN	Dido Havenaar (to Júbilo Iwata)
—	GK	JPN	Tsuneyoshi Ōsaki
—	DF	JPN	Hisataka Fujikawa (to JEF United Ichihara)
—	DF	JPN	Shigemitsu Egawa (to Vissel Kobe)
—	DF	BRA	Garça
—	DF	JPN	Shinji Ishihara
—	DF	JPN	Kazuhito Yamamoto
—	MF	BRA	Jorginho
—	MF	JPN	Michihiro Tsuruta (to Vissel Kobe)
—	MF	JPN	Nariyasu Yasuhara
—	MF	JPN	Hideyoshi Akita
—	MF	YUG	Dragiša Binić
—	FW	ENG	Gary Lineker (retired)
—	FW	JPN	Akiyoshi Yoshida
—	FW	BRA	Elivélton
—	FW	JPN	Kazutoshi Ishiyama
—	FW	JPN	Hiroshi Asō
—	FW	JPN	Hiromasa Yamaguchi

== Transfers during the season ==
=== In ===
- (Japan) Seiji Honda (from Chukyo University)
- (Japan) 伊藤 亘 (from Kokushikan University)
- (Japan) Tomoya Yamagami (from Chukyo High School)

=== Out ===
- (Japan) Tarō Gotō (to JEF United Ichihara)
- (Japan) Takaki Kanda (retired)

== Awards ==
- J.League Most Valuable Player: (Federal Republic of Yugoslavia) Stojković
- J.League Best XI: (Federal Republic of Yugoslavia) Stojković

== Other pages ==
- (in Japanese) J. League official site
- (in Japanese) Nagoya Grampus official site
