= 1995 Urawa Red Diamonds season =

Urawa Red Diamonds
1995 season
- Manager: Holger Osieck
- Stadium: Urawa Komaba Stadium
- J.League: 4th
- Emperor's Cup: Quarterfinals
- Top goalscorer: League: Masahiro Fukuda (32); All: Masahiro Fukuda (34)
- Highest home attendance: 22,150 (vs Júbilo Iwata, 9 September 1995); 56,652 (vs Verdy Kawasaki, 3 May 1995, Tokyo National Stadium)
- Lowest home attendance: 19,044 (vs Cerezo Osaka, 7 October 1995); 9,168 (vs Sanfrecce Hiroshima, 8 July 1995, Omiya Football Stadium)
- Average home league attendance: 19,560
Home colours	Away colours

1995 Urawa Red Diamonds season

== Review and events ==
=== League results summary ===
Overall								Home						Away					
Pld	W	D	L	GF	GA	GD	Pts	W	D	L	GF	GA	GD	W	D	L	GF	GA	GD
52	29	0	23	85	72	+13	90	16	0	10	41	36	+5	13	0	13	44	36	+8

Source: J.LEAGUE OFFICIAL RECORD & DATA 1996. ISBN 4-09-102323-1.

=== League results by round ===
J.League Suntory series (first stage)
Round	1	2	3	4	5	6	7	8	9	10	11	12	13	14	15	16	17	18	19	20	21	22	23	24	25	26
Ground	A	H	A	H	A	H	A	A	H	A	H	A	H	A	H	A	H	A	H	H	A	H	A	H	A	H
Result	L	W	L	L	L	L	W	W	W	L	L	L	W	W	W	L	W	L	W	W	W	W	W	W	L	W
Position	11	8	11	10	12	12	12	9	9	9	9	9	9	9	9	9	7	7	7	6	6	5	4	3	4	3

Source: J.LEAGUE OFFICIAL RECORD & DATA 1996. ISBN 4-09-102323-1.
A = Away; H = Home; W = Win; D = Draw; L = Loss

J.League NICOS series (second stage)
Round	1	2	3	4	5	6	7	8	9	10	11	12	13	14	15	16	17	18	19	20	21	22	23	24	25	26
Ground	A	H	A	H	A	A	H	H	A	A	H	A	H	A	H	A	H	H	A	A	H	H	A	H	A	H
Result	W	L	W	L	W	W	W	W	L	L	L	L	L	L	L	W	W	L	W	L	W	W	W	L	W	W
Position	1	4	3	6	5	4	2	2	3	4	6	7	7	9	11	7	7	9	8	10	9	9	6	10	8	8

Source: J.LEAGUE OFFICIAL RECORD & DATA 1996. ISBN 4-09-102323-1.
A = Away; H = Home; W = Win; D = Draw; L = Loss

== Competitions ==
Competitions	Position
J.League	4th / 14 clubs
Emperor's Cup	Quarterfinals

== Domestic results ==
=== J.League ===
18 March 1995 1st-1	Yokohama Flügels	1–0	Urawa Red Diamonds	Yokohama Mitsuzawa Football Stadium
15:03 JST (UTC+09)	Maeda 27'	J. League		Attendance: 12,236; Referee: Armando Perez; Assistant referees: Noboru Ishiyama, Masahiro Katagiri; Fourth official: Toshiya Kumagai

22 March 1995 1st-2	Urawa Red Diamonds	1–0	JEF United Ichihara	Omiya Football Stadium
19:03 JST (UTC+09)	Bein 72'	J. League		Attendance: 9,704; Referee: Tatsumi Ōno; Assistant referees: Satoru Ishizawa, Tōru Kamikawa; Fourth official: Izumi Okada; Man of the Match: Masaki Tsuchihashi

25 March 1995 1st-3	Gamba Osaka	2–0	Urawa Red Diamonds	Expo '70 Commemorative Stadium
14:59 JST (UTC+09)	Isogai 51'; Morioka 68'	J. League		Attendance: 13,356; Referee: Shinichirō Obata; Assistant referees: Kazuo Kakihana, Mitsuyoshi Nakaguma; Fourth official: Sōichirō Kaneko

29 March 1995 1st-4	Urawa Red Diamonds	0–0 (V-goal) (a.e.t.) (9–10 p)	Nagoya Grampus Eight	Tokyo National Stadium
19:04 JST (UTC+09)		J. League		Attendance: 44,464; Referee: Kiyoshi Ōta; Assistant referees: Takeshi Ōkura, Tetsu Karakida; Fourth official: Noritake Sakurada
	Penalties
	(penalty scored) Fukuda; (penalty scored) Taguchi; (penalty missed) Buchwald; (penalty missed) Tsuchihashi; (penalty scored) Yamada; (penalty scored) Hori; (penalty scored) Hirose; (penalty scored) Sugiyama; (penalty missed) Okano; (penalty missed) F. Ikeda; (penalty scored) Tsuchida; (penalty scored) Fukuda; (penalty scored) Taguchi; (penalty missed) Buchwald		(penalty scored) Durix; (penalty missed) Passi; (penalty scored) Torres; (penalty scored) Moriyama; (penalty missed) Asano; (penalty scored) Iijima; (penalty scored) Nakanishi; (penalty scored) Sakakura; (penalty missed) Hirano; (penalty missed) Katō; (penalty scored) Y. Itō; (penalty scored) Durix; (penalty scored) Passi; (penalty scored) Torres

1 April 1995 1st-5	Júbilo Iwata	2–0	Urawa Red Diamonds	Júbilo Iwata Stadium
14:02 JST (UTC+09)	Nakayama 5'; Schillaci 7'	J. League		Attendance: 17,621; Referee: Keiichi Sunakawa; Assistant referees: Yū Nakamura, Takayoshi Kashino; Fourth official: Takuya Okada

5 April 1995 1st-6	Urawa Red Diamonds	0–1	Bellmare Hiratsuka	Omiya Football Stadium
19:02 JST (UTC+09)		J. League	Almir 83'	Attendance: 9,630; Referee: Lutz Fröhlich; Assistant referees: Noboru Ishiyama, Toshimitsu Yoshida; Fourth official: Shigeru Kimura

8 April 1995 1st-7	Cerezo Osaka	0–1 (V-goal) (a.e.t.)	Urawa Red Diamonds	Osaka Nagai No.2 Stadium
15:03 JST (UTC+09)		J. League	Fukuda 110'	Attendance: 11,763; Referee: Yōtarō Moritsu; Assistant referees: Kazuya Yanagisawa, Hiroshi Tanabe; Fourth official: Tsuyoshi Miyake; Man of the Match: Masahiro Fukuda

12 April 1995 1st-8	Yokohama Marinos	2–3 (V-goal) (a.e.t.)	Urawa Red Diamonds	Tokyo National Stadium
19:02 JST (UTC+09)	M. Suzuki 44'; Díaz 66'	J. League	Rummenigge 0'; Bein 68' (pen.) 104'	Attendance: 48,710; Referee: Armando Perez; Assistant referees: Yū Nakamura, Tōru Kamikawa; Fourth official: Keizō Yamazaki; Man of the Match: Bein

15 April 1995 1st-9	Urawa Red Diamonds	4–0	Kashiwa Reysol	Omiya Football Stadium
14:59 JST (UTC+09)	Bein 22', 47' (pen.); Fukuda 37'; Buchwald 58'	J. League		Attendance: 9,759; Referee: Juan Carlos Crespi; Assistant referees: Tetsu Karakida, Takayoshi Kashino; Fourth official: Toshimitsu Yasumoto; Man of the Match: Bein

22 April 1995 1st-10	Sanfrecce Hiroshima	1–1 (V-goal) (a.e.t.) (4–2 p)	Urawa Red Diamonds	Hiroshima Big Arch
15:03 JST (UTC+09)	Moriyasu 3'	J. League	Bein 44'	Attendance: 12,387; Referee: Hiroyuki Umemoto; Assistant referees: Hiroshi Tanabe, Naoki Esumi; Fourth official: Kōji Hanaguchi
	Penalties
	(penalty scored) Van Loen; (penalty scored) Mori; (penalty scored) Moriyasu; (penalty scored) Kuwabara		(penalty scored) Fukuda; (penalty missed) Taguchi; (penalty scored) Hirose; (penalty missed) Hori

26 April 1995 1st-11	Urawa Red Diamonds	2–3	Shimizu S-Pulse	Omiya Football Stadium
19:04 JST (UTC+09)	Mizuuchi 45'; Fukuda 75' (pen.)	J. League	Sawanobori 26'; Toninho 64'; Dias 85'	Attendance: 9,739; Referee: Tetsuya Hamana; Assistant referees: Hitoshi Yamada, Mitsuru Satō; Fourth official: Noboru Shioi

29 April 1995 1st-12	Kashima Antlers	1–0 (V-goal) (a.e.t.)	Urawa Red Diamonds	Kashima Soccer Stadium
15:01 JST (UTC+09)	Leonardo 94' (pen.)	J. League		Attendance: 15,962; Referee: Armando Perez; Assistant referees: Takashi Kunori, Masato Nogami; Fourth official: Toshimitsu Teruyama

3 May 1995 1st-13	Urawa Red Diamonds	2–2 (V-goal) (a.e.t.) (4–3 p)	Verdy Kawasaki	Tokyo National Stadium
19:03 JST (UTC+09)	Bein 42'; Okano 85'	J. League	Pereira 18'; Kitazawa 68'	Attendance: 56,652; Referee: Kiyoshi Ōta; Assistant referees: Mitsuru Satō, Ichirō Inukai; Fourth official: Noritake Sakurada; Man of the Match: Masayuki Okano
	Penalties
	(penalty missed) Fukuda; (penalty scored) Taguchi; (penalty scored) Hirose; (penalty scored) Buchwald; (penalty scored) Mizuuchi		(penalty scored) Pereira; (penalty missed) Hashiratani; (penalty scored) Bismarck; (penalty missed) Hayashi; (penalty scored) Kitazawa

6 May 1995 1st-14	JEF United Ichihara	0–1	Urawa Red Diamonds	Tokyo National Stadium
15:03 JST (UTC+09)		J. League	Taguchi 89'	Attendance: 52,149; Referee: Yoshimi Ogawa; Assistant referees: Kazuaki Hamaguchi, Toshimitsu Yoshida; Fourth official: Hide Lii; Man of the Match: Yoshinori Taguchi

10 May 1995 1st-15	Urawa Red Diamonds	4–2	Gamba Osaka	Omiya Football Stadium
19:02 JST (UTC+09)	Fukuda 10', 75'; Bein 58'; Tsuchihashi 89'	J. League	Yamaguchi 32'; Gillhaus 89'	Attendance: 9,589; Referee: Tetsuya Hamana; Assistant referees: Toshiyuki Mayuzumi, Takashi Kunori; Fourth official: Izumi Okada; Man of the Match: Masahiro Fukuda

13 May 1995 1st-16	Nagoya Grampus Eight	2–2 (V-goal) (a.e.t.) (7–6 p)	Urawa Red Diamonds	Tokyo National Stadium
16:03 JST (UTC+09)	Stojković 50', 82' (pen.)	J. League	Fukuda 68' (pen.); Taguchi 74'	Attendance: 36,770; Referee: Juan Carlos Crespi; Assistant referees: Kazuya Yanagisawa, Ichirō Inukai; Fourth official: Tsutomu Anazawa
	Penalties
	(penalty scored) Durix; (penalty scored) Stojković; (penalty scored) Iijima; (penalty missed) Okayama; (penalty scored) Yonekura; (penalty scored) Asano; (penalty scored) Ogawa; (penalty scored) Mori		(penalty scored) Fukuda; (penalty scored) Buchwald; (penalty scored) Hirose; (penalty missed) Sugiyama; (penalty scored) Yamada; (penalty scored) N. Ikeda; (penalty scored) Okano; (penalty missed) Tsuchihashi

17 June 1995 1st-17	Urawa Red Diamonds	2–1	Júbilo Iwata	Niigata Stadium
18:32 JST (UTC+09)	Bein 4'; Fukuda 35' (pen.)	J. League	Schillaci 48'	Attendance: 14,122; Referee: Hideo Kikuchi; Assistant referees: Mitsuru Satō, Kōji Taniuchi; Fourth official: Naoki Nakamura; Man of the Match: Buchwald

21 June 1995 1st-18	Bellmare Hiratsuka	3–1	Urawa Red Diamonds	Hiratsuka Stadium
19:03 JST (UTC+09)	T. Iwamoto 4'; Betinho 56'; Nakata 89'	J. League	Fukuda 84' (pen.)	Attendance: 13,673; Referee: Fumikazu Shioyazono; Assistant referees: Takashi Kunori, Akihisa Makino; Fourth official: Jōji Kashihara; Man of the Match: Kazuaki Tasaka

24 June 1995 1st-19	Urawa Red Diamonds	2–0	Cerezo Osaka	Omiya Football Stadium
18:33 JST (UTC+09)	Bein 62'; Fukuda 78' (pen.)	J. League		Attendance: 9,912; Referee: Tatsumi Ōno; Assistant referees: Masato Nogami, Hisaharu Kitamura; Fourth official: Shigeru Kimura; Man of the Match: Buchwald

28 June 1995 1st-20	Urawa Red Diamonds	2–1 (V-goal) (a.e.t.)	Yokohama Marinos	Omiya Football Stadium
19:02 JST (UTC+09)	Bein 67'; Hirose 99'	J. League	Medina Bello 51'	Attendance: 9,924; Referee: Lutz Fröhlich; Assistant referees: Peter Augar, Olaf Blumenstein; Fourth official: Izumi Okada; Man of the Match: Osamu Hirose

1 July 1995 1st-21	Kashiwa Reysol	1–2	Urawa Red Diamonds	Kashiwa Hitachi Stadium
19:00 JST (UTC+09)	N. Katō 85' (pen.)	J. League	Fukuda 49' (pen.), 89' (pen.)	Attendance: 12,329; Referee: Armando Perez; Assistant referees: Yū Nakamura, Ichirō Inukai; Fourth official: Shigeaki Yoshiya; Man of the Match: Masahiro Fukuda

8 July 1995 1st-22	Urawa Red Diamonds	3–2 (V-goal) (a.e.t.)	Sanfrecce Hiroshima	Omiya Football Stadium
18:33 JST (UTC+09)	Fukuda 23' 93'; Fukunaga 89'	J. League	Uemura 61'; Michiki 89'	Attendance: 9,168; Referee: Keiichi Sunakawa; Assistant referees: Toshiyuki Mayuzumi, Kō Ōishi; Fourth official: Toshimitsu Yasumoto; Man of the Match: Masahiro Fukuda

12 July 1995 1st-23	Shimizu S-Pulse	2–3 (V-goal) (a.e.t.)	Urawa Red Diamonds	Nihondaira Sports Stadium
19:02 JST (UTC+09)	Sawanobori 13', 59' (pen.)	J. League	Taguchi 34'; Fukunaga 44'; Fukuda 111'	Attendance: 18,643; Referee: Juan Carlos Crespi; Assistant referees: Kazuya Yanagisawa, Yoshikazu Hiroshima; Fourth official: Toshiyuki Asanuma; Man of the Match: Masahiro Fukuda

15 July 1995 1st-24	Urawa Red Diamonds	2–1	Kashima Antlers	Omiya Football Stadium
18:33 JST (UTC+09)	Buchwald 61'; Okano 85'	J. League	Honda 43'	Attendance: 10,019; Referee: Kiyoshi Ōta; Assistant referees: Hiroshi Fukuda, Tetsuya Hamana; Fourth official: Keiichi Sunakawa; Man of the Match: Masayuki Okano

19 July 1995 1st-25	Verdy Kawasaki	2–1 (V-goal) (a.e.t.)	Urawa Red Diamonds	Kawasaki Todoroki Stadium
19:00 JST (UTC+09)	Sugawara 54'; Alcindo 102'	J. League	Buchwald 75'	Attendance: 12,761; Referee: Fumikazu Shioyazono; Assistant referees: Yū Nakamura, Takuji Fukazawa; Fourth official: Nobutaka Fukamiya

22 July 1995 1st-26	Urawa Red Diamonds	2–2 (V-goal) (a.e.t.) (5–3 p)	Yokohama Flügels	Omiya Football Stadium
19:02 JST (UTC+09)	Fukuda 18'; Taguchi 22'	J. League	Miura 13'; Yamaguchi 41' (pen.)	Attendance: 10,354; Referee: Juan Carlos Crespi; Assistant referees: Kazuaki Hamaguchi, Toshimitsu Yoshida; Fourth official: Masahisa Kajiwara; Man of the Match: Hisashi Tsuchida
	Penalties
	(penalty scored) Fukuda; (penalty scored) Taguchi; (penalty scored) Hirose; (penalty scored) Yamada; (penalty scored) Buchwald		(penalty scored) Evair; (penalty missed) Miura; (penalty scored) Kuboyama; (penalty scored) Kaetsu

12 August 1995 2nd-1	Yokohama Flügels	0–6	Urawa Red Diamonds	Nagasaki Stadium
19:03 JST (UTC+09)		J. League	6' (o.g.); Buchwald 62'; Fukuda 66' (pen.), 89' (pen.); Toninho 75'; Yamada 77'	Attendance: 11,954; Referee: Hiroyuki Umemoto; Assistant referees: Kōji Minami, Hiroyuki Izumi; Fourth official: Shigehisa Yamaguchi; Man of the Match: Buchwald

16 August 1995 2nd-2	Urawa Red Diamonds	1–2	Shimizu S-Pulse	Urawa Komaba Stadium
19:07 JST (UTC+09)	Fukuda 3'	J. League	Massaro 74'; T. Itō 80'	Attendance: 21,559; Referee: Alfredo Trentalange; Assistant referees: Yasuhiro Matsuzaki, Satoru Ishizawa; Fourth official: Toshimitsu Yasumoto

19 August 1995 2nd-3	Cerezo Osaka	0–1 (V-goal) (a.e.t.)	Urawa Red Diamonds	Osaka Nagai No.2 Stadium
19:00 JST (UTC+09)		J. League	Fukuda 115' (pen.)	Attendance: 12,091; Referee: Naotsugu Fuse; Assistant referees: Morihisa Yamaguchi, Naoyuki Mori; Fourth official: Tsuyoshi Miyake; Man of the Match: Osamu Hirose

23 August 1995 2nd-4	Urawa Red Diamonds	0–2	Kashiwa Reysol	Tokyo National Stadium
19:03 JST (UTC+09)		J. League	Hashiratani 32', 42'	Attendance: 51,580; Referee: Yoshitsugu Katayama; Assistant referees: Hitoshi Yamada, Kō Ōishi; Fourth official: Hide Lii

26 August 1995 2nd-5	Sanfrecce Hiroshima	0–1 (V-goal) (a.e.t.)	Urawa Red Diamonds	Hiroshima Big Arch
18:30 JST (UTC+09)		J. League	Fukuda 92'	Attendance: 14,545; Referee: Masayoshi Okada; Assistant referees: Satoru Kawano, Kōji Minami; Fourth official: Katsuya Motoyasu; Man of the Match: Masahiro Fukuda

2 September 1995 2nd-6	Gamba Osaka	1–4	Urawa Red Diamonds	Expo '70 Commemorative Stadium
19:00 JST (UTC+09)	Gillhaus 56'	J. League	Bein 42', 84'; Fukuda 53', 89'	Attendance: 15,181; Referee: Hiroyuki Umemoto; Assistant referees: Naoyuki Mori, Mikio Fukuoka; Fourth official: Tsuyoshi Miyake; Man of the Match: Bein

6 September 1995 2nd-7	Urawa Red Diamonds	3–2	Bellmare Hiratsuka	Urawa Komaba Stadium
19:01 JST (UTC+09)	Fukuda 2', 77' (pen.); Toninho 66'	J. League	Noguchi 11'; Betinho 17'	Attendance: 20,417; Referee: Naotsugu Fuse; Assistant referees: Kazuaki Hamaguchi, Toshiyuki Mayuzumi; Fourth official: Ichirō Kuwabara; Man of the Match: Masaki Tsuchihashi

9 September 1995 2nd-8	Urawa Red Diamonds	1–0	Júbilo Iwata	Urawa Komaba Stadium
18:33 JST (UTC+09)	Toninho 69'	J. League		Attendance: 22,150; Referee: Kiyoshi Ōta; Assistant referees: Kenichi Koshiyama, Kō Ōishi; Fourth official: Shigeru Kimura; Man of the Match: Toninho

13 September 1995 2nd-9	Yokohama Marinos	3–1	Urawa Red Diamonds	Yokohama Mitsuzawa Football Stadium
19:03 JST (UTC+09)	Bisconti 68', 77'; Medina Bello 74'	J. League	Toninho 38'	Attendance: 13,205; Referee: Zoran Petrović; Assistant referees: Hitoshi Yamada, Takayoshi Kashino; Fourth official: Kazuhiko Uchida

16 September 1995 2nd-10	JEF United Ichihara	1–0 (V-goal) (a.e.t.)	Urawa Red Diamonds	Niigata Stadium
19:03 JST (UTC+09)	Jō 116'	J. League		Attendance: 14,543; Referee: Hideo Kikuchi; Assistant referees: Masahiro Katagiri, Sōichirō Kaneko; Fourth official: Masaaki Shimomura

23 September 1995 2nd-11	Urawa Red Diamonds	1–2	Nagoya Grampus Eight	Urawa Komaba Stadium
15:01 JST (UTC+09)	Fukuda 42' (pen.)	J. League	Okayama 2'; Durix 35' (pen.)	Attendance: 21,101; Referee: Alfredo Trentalange; Assistant referees: Toshiyuki Mayuzumi, Toshimitsu Yoshida; Fourth official: Akio Hayashi

27 September 1995 2nd-12	Kashima Antlers	2–0	Urawa Red Diamonds	Kashima Soccer Stadium
19:00 JST (UTC+09)	Leonardo 8', 66'	J. League		Attendance: 15,819; Referee: Kenji Tanaka; Assistant referees: Kazuaki Hamaguchi, Kimio Izaki; Fourth official: Toshio Itō

30 September 1995 2nd-13	Urawa Red Diamonds	0–2	Verdy Kawasaki	Urawa Komaba Stadium
19:04 JST (UTC+09)		J. League	Miura 46'; Bismarck 56'	Attendance: 20,938; Referee: Masayoshi Okada; Assistant referees: Toshiyuki Mayuzumi, Mitsuyoshi Nakaguma; Fourth official: Izumi Okada

4 October 1995 2nd-14	Shimizu S-Pulse	2–1 (V-goal) (a.e.t.)	Urawa Red Diamonds	Nihondaira Sports Stadium
19:03 JST (UTC+09)	Marco 22'; Santos 98'	J. League	Toninho 16'	Attendance: 17,934; Referee: Armando Perez; Assistant referees: Masahiro Katagiri, Toshimitsu Yoshida; Fourth official: Masakazu Hōjō

7 October 1995 2nd-15	Urawa Red Diamonds	1–3	Cerezo Osaka	Urawa Komaba Stadium
15:03 JST (UTC+09)	Fukuda 37' (pen.)	J. League	Fukagawa 51'; Bernardo 61'; Morishima 86'	Attendance: 19,044; Referee: Fumikazu Shioyazono; Assistant referees: Kazuaki Hamaguchi, Kimio Izaki; Fourth official: Keiji Kamiara

14 October 1995 2nd-16	Kashiwa Reysol	2–5	Urawa Red Diamonds	Kashiwa Hitachi Stadium
15:03 JST (UTC+09)	Tanada 64'; Bentinho 89'	J. League	Okano 10', 34'; Bein 29'; Fukunaga 59'; Toninho 68'	Attendance: 13,061; Referee: Hiroyuki Umemoto; Assistant referees: Hideaki Harada, Satoru Kawano; Fourth official: Eita Horikawa; Man of the Match: Masayuki Okano

18 October 1995 2nd-17	Urawa Red Diamonds	2–1	Sanfrecce Hiroshima	Urawa Komaba Stadium
19:03 JST (UTC+09)	Hirose 9'; Tsuchihashi 25'	J. League	Huistra 55'	Attendance: 19,878; Referee: Yasuhiro Matsuzaki; Assistant referees: Yū Nakamura, Noboru Ishiyama; Fourth official: Toshimitsu Yasumoto; Man of the Match: Buchwald

21 October 1995 2nd-18	Urawa Red Diamonds	0–1	Gamba Osaka	Urawa Komaba Stadium
15:01 JST (UTC+09)		J. League	Isogai 63' (pen.)	Attendance: 19,712; Referee: Naotsugu Fuse; Assistant referees: Kimio Izaki, Ichirō Inukai; Fourth official: Shigeru Kimura

1 November 1995 2nd-19	Bellmare Hiratsuka	2–3	Urawa Red Diamonds	Tokyo National Stadium
19:03 JST (UTC+09)	Betinho 22' (pen.); Noguchi 68'	J. League	Okano 9'; Hori 32'; Fukuda 39'	Attendance: 42,191; Referee: Tetsuya Hamana; Assistant referees: Hitoshi Yamada, Takuji Fukazawa; Fourth official: Masao Yamanaka; Man of the Match: Masayuki Okano

4 November 1995 2nd-20	Júbilo Iwata	2–1	Urawa Red Diamonds	Júbilo Iwata Stadium
14:00 JST (UTC+09)	65' (o.g.); Fujita 81'	J. League	Fukunaga 11'	Attendance: 15,758; Referee: Shinichirō Obata; Assistant referees: Kimio Izaki, Masahiro Katagiri; Fourth official: Toshiaki Futamata

8 November 1995 2nd-21	Urawa Red Diamonds	2–2 (V-goal) (a.e.t.) (5–4 p)	Yokohama Marinos	Urawa Komaba Stadium
19:05 JST (UTC+09)	Sugiyama 43'; Bein 69'	J. League	Medina Bello 37'; Bisconti 89'	Attendance: 19,455; Referee: Fumikazu Shioyazono; Assistant referees: Yasushi Tsuchimoto, Hisaharu Kitamura; Fourth official: Izumi Okada; Man of the Match: Takafumi Hori
	Penalties
	(penalty scored) Fukuda; (penalty scored) Hirose; (penalty scored) Toninho; (penalty scored) Yamada; (penalty scored) Bein		(penalty scored) Bisconti; (penalty scored) Medina Bello; (penalty scored) M. Suzuki; (penalty scored) Ihara; (penalty missed) Noda

11 November 1995 2nd-22	Urawa Red Diamonds	2–1	JEF United Ichihara	Urawa Komaba Stadium
15:06 JST (UTC+09)	Fukuda 79'; Bein 86'	J. League	Ejiri 28'	Attendance: 19,433; Referee: Yasuhiro Matsuzaki; Assistant referees: Hiroshi Fukuda, Naoki Esumi; Fourth official: Toshimitsu Yasumoto; Man of the Match: Yasushi Fukunaga

15 November 1995 2nd-23	Nagoya Grampus Eight	2–4	Urawa Red Diamonds	Nagoya Mizuho Athletics Stadium
19:05 JST (UTC+09)	Stojković 15'; Ogura 48'	J. League	Fukuda 27', 84'; Nakashima 53'; Bein 65'	Attendance: 21,579; Referee: Yoshitsugu Katayama; Assistant referees: Kazuaki Hamaguchi, Kōji Taniuchi; Fourth official: Tsutomu Sugiura; Man of the Match: Masahiro Fukuda

18 November 1995 2nd-24	Urawa Red Diamonds	0–2	Kashima Antlers	Urawa Komaba Stadium
15:03 JST (UTC+09)		J. League	Kumagai 43'; Mazinho 89'	Attendance: 19,660; Referee: Masayoshi Okada; Assistant referees: Takeshi Ōkura, Kazuhisa Osada; Fourth official: Masahisa Kajiwara

22 November 1995 2nd-25	Verdy Kawasaki	0–2	Urawa Red Diamonds	Kawasaki Todoroki Stadium
19:05 JST (UTC+09)		J. League	Bein 39'; Fukuda 87'	Attendance: 20,392; Referee: Jamal Al-Sharif; Assistant referees: Hiroshi Fukuda, Kenichi Koshiyama; Fourth official: Michio Nakahara; Man of the Match: Hisashi Tsuchida

25 November 1995 2nd-26	Urawa Red Diamonds	2–1	Yokohama Flügels	Urawa Komaba Stadium
15:04 JST (UTC+09)	Fukuda 75' (pen.); Hori 82'	J. League	Miura 85'	Attendance: 20,591; Referee: Tetsuya Hamana; Assistant referees: Morihisa Yamaguchi, Ichirō Inukai; Fourth official: Akio Hayashi; Man of the Match: Masahiro Fukuda

=== Emperor's Cup ===
3 December 1995 1st Round	Urawa Red Diamonds	2–0	Sapporo University	Urawa Komaba Stadium
13:02 JST (UTC+09)	Fukuda 67' (pen.); Bein 76'			Attendance: 18,999; Referee: Tatsumi Ōno

10 December 1995 2nd Round	Urawa Red Diamonds	1–0	Kashiwa Reysol	Tochigi Utsunomiya Green Stadium
12:59 JST (UTC+09)	Bein 31'			Attendance: 14,342; Referee: Yōtarō Moritsu

17 December 1995 Quarterfinals	Urawa Red Diamonds	1–2 (V-goal) (a.e.t.)	Gamba Osaka	Expo '70 Commemorative Stadium
13:00 JST (UTC+09)	Fukuda 44'		Aleinikov 1'; Gillhaus 110'	Attendance: 7,326; Referee: Yoshimi Ogawa

== Player statistics ==
No.	Pos	Nat	Player	Total		J-League		Emperor's Cup	
No.	Pos	Nat	Player	Apps	Goals	Apps	Goals	Apps	Goals
	GK	(Japan) JPN	Hisashi Tsuchida	50	0	47	0	3	0
	GK	(Japan) JPN	Yūki Takita	5	0	5	0	0	0
	GK	(Japan) JPN	Masahiro Ōta	0	0	0	0	0	0
	GK	(Japan) JPN	Norio Takahashi	0	0	0	0	0	0
	GK	(Japan) JPN	Hiroki Aratani	0	0	0	0	0	0
	DF	(Germany) GER	Guido Buchwald	54	4	51	4	3	0
	DF	(Japan) JPN	Yoshinori Taguchi	36	4	36	4	0	0
	DF	(Japan) JPN	Masanaga Kageyama	0	0	0	0	0	0
	DF	(South Korea) KOR	Cho Kwi-Jea (Note: In J.League and domestic competitions, he was considered as a Japanese player.)	26	0	26	0	0	0
	DF	(Japan) JPN	Yukinori Muramatsu	0	0	0	0	0	0
	DF	(Japan) JPN	Futoshi Ikeda	8	0	8	0	0	0
	DF	(Japan) JPN	Tsutomu Nishino	19	0	17	0	2	0
	DF	(Japan) JPN	Kiyonobu Okajima	0	0	0	0	0	0
	DF	(Japan) JPN	Kōichi Sugiyama	45	1	44	1	1	0
	DF	(Japan) JPN	Yūta Nakazawa	0	0	0	0	0	0
	DF	(Japan) JPN	Naohiko Noro	0	0	0	0	0	0
	DF	(Japan) JPN	Ken Iwase	9	0	9	0	0	0
	DF	(Japan) JPN	Nobuhisa Yamada	45	1	42	1	3	0
	DF	(Japan) JPN	Takeshi Nakashima	11	1	8	1	3	0
	MF	(Germany) GER	Uwe Bein	41	20	38	18	3	2
	MF	(Germany) GER	Michael Rummenigge	9	1	9	1	0	0
	MF	(Japan) JPN	Satoru Mochizuki	0	0	0	0	0	0
	MF	(Japan) JPN	Osamu Hirose	51	2	49	2	2	0
	MF	(Japan) JPN	Takafumi Hori	34	2	31	2	3	0
	MF	(Japan) JPN	Shirō Kikuhara	1	0	1	0	0	0
	MF	(Japan) JPN	Edwin Uehara	0	0	0	0	0	0
	MF	(Japan) JPN	Nobuyuki Hosaka	0	0	0	0	0	0
	MF	(Japan) JPN	Masaki Tsuchihashi	54	2	51	2	3	0
	MF	(Japan) JPN	Yasushi Fukunaga	29	4	26	4	3	0
	MF	(Japan) JPN	Naoto Sakurai	5	0	5	0	0	0
	MF	(Japan) JPN	Hideto Saitō	0	0	0	0	0	0
	FW	(Japan) JPN	Masahiro Fukuda	53	34	50	32	3	2
	FW	(Japan) JPN	Yoshiaki Satō	0	0	0	0	0	0
	FW	(Japan) JPN	Shinichi Kawano	0	0	0	0	0	0
	FW	(Japan) JPN	Nobuyasu Ikeda	23	0	21	0	2	0
	FW	(Japan) JPN	Masayuki Okano	47	5	44	5	3	0
	FW	(Japan) JPN	Takeshi Mizuuchi	10	1	10	1	0	0
	FW	(Japan) JPN	Yūichi Sonoda	0	0	0	0	0	0
	FW	(South Korea) KOR	Kwak Kyung-Keun †	0	0	0	0	0	0
	FW	(Brazil) BRA	Toninho †	28	6	26	6	2	0

- † player(s) joined the team after the opening of this season.

== Transfers ==
In:

No.	Pos.	Nation	Player
—	GK	JPN	Masahiro Ōta (from JEF United Ichihara)
—	DF	JPN	Masanaga Kageyama (from JEF United Ichihara)
—	MF	JPN	Masaki Tsuchihashi (from Kokushikan University)
—	MF	JPN	Yasushi Fukunaga (from Aoyama Gakuin University)

Out:

No.	Pos.	Nation	Player
—	GK	JPN	Akihisa Sonobe (retired)
—	FW	GER	Uwe Rahn
—	DF	JPN	Takeshi Motoyoshi (to Otsuka Pharmaceutical)
—	DF	JPN	Makoto Yamazaki (to Tokyo Gas)
—	DF	JPN	Hiroyuki Sawada (to Kyoto Purple Sanga)
—	DF	JPN	Yoshinori Matsuda (to PJM Futures)
—	DF	JPN	Tomo Satō (retired)
—	DF	JPN	Kenji Sakaguchi (to Kofu soccer club)
—	MF	JPN	Atsushi Natori (retired)
—	MF	JPN	Akinori Mikami (retired)
—	MF	JPN	Hideki Kanō (to NTT Kyushu)
—	MF	JPN	Kōichi Nakazato (retired)
—	MF	JPN	Yasunori Tsukao (retired)
—	MF	JPN	Nobuo Kikuhara (retired)
—	MF	JPN	Tetsuya Asano (loan return to Nagoya Grampus Eight)
—	FW	SVK	Lulu
—	FW	JPN	Hiroshi Ninomiya (to Prima Ham F.C.)
—	FW	JPN	Hideyuki Imakura (to Yono Shukonkai)
—	FW	JPN	Noriaki Shimura (retired)
—	FW	JPN	Masahiro Sukigara (to Fukushima FC)

== Transfers during the season ==
=== In ===
- (South Korea) Kwak Kyung-Keun (from Fukuoka Blux on May)
- (Brazil) Toninho (loan from Shimizu S-Pulse on August)

=== Out ===
- (Japan) Satoru Mochizuki (to Kyoto Purple Sanga on June)
- (Japan) Kiyonobu Okajima (to Tokyo Gas on July)
- (Japan) Yoshiaki Satō (to Kyoto Purple Sanga on July)
- (South Korea) Kwak Kyung-Keun (to Fukushima FC on July)

== Awards ==
- J.League Top Scorer: (Japan) Masahiro Fukuda
- J.League Best XI: (Germany) Guido Buchwald, (Japan) Masahiro Fukuda

== Other pages ==
- (in Japanese) J. League official site
- (in Japanese) Urawa Red Diamonds official site
