= 1996 Nagoya Grampus Eight season =

Nagoya Grampus Eight
1996 season
- Manager: (France) Arsène Wenger; (Portugal) José Alberto Costa (acting manager, September 1996); (Portugal) Carlos Queiroz (October 1996)
- Stadium: Nagoya Mizuho Athletics Stadium
- J.League: Runners-up
- Emperor's Cup: 3rd Round
- J.League Cup: GL-B 7th
- Super Cup: Winner
- Suntory Cup: Champions
- Asian Cup Winners' Cup: Runners-up
- Top goalscorer: League: (Federal Republic of Yugoslavia) Dragan Stojković (11) (Japan) Yasuyuki Moriyama (11); All: (Federal Republic of Yugoslavia) Dragan Stojković (16)
- Highest home attendance: 22,613 (vs Verdy Kawasaki, 17 April 1996); 23,861 (vs Yokohama Flügels, 4 May 1996, Gifu Nagaragawa Stadium)
- Lowest home attendance: 20,679 (vs JEF United Ichihara, 2 November 1996)
- Average home league attendance: 21,699
Home colours	Away colours

1996 Nagoya Grampus Eight season

== Review and events ==
=== League results summary ===
Overall								Home						Away					
Pld	W	D	L	GF	GA	GD	Pts	W	D	L	GF	GA	GD	W	D	L	GF	GA	GD
30	21	0	9	63	39	+24	63	10	0	5	30	17	+13	11	0	4	33	22	+11

Source: J.LEAGUE OFFICIAL GUIDE 1997. ISBN 4-09-102329-0.

=== League results by round ===
Round	1	2	3	4	5	6	7	8	9	10	11	12	13	14	15	16	17	18	19	20	21	22	23	24	25	26	27	28	29	30
Ground	H	A	H	A	H	A	H	H	A	A	H	H	A	H	A	A	H	A	H	A	H	A	H	A	H	A	A	H	A	H
Result	W	W	W	W	L	W	W	W	L	L	W	L	W	L	W	W	W	W	W	W	L	W	W	W	L	W	L	W	L	W
Position	1	2	2	1	5	4	4	3	4	4	4	5	5	5	6	6	5	3	3	2	3	3	2	1	2	2	3	3	4	2

Source: J.LEAGUE OFFICIAL GUIDE 1997. ISBN 4-09-102329-0.
A = Away; H = Home; W = Win; D = Draw; L = Loss

== Competitions ==
Competitions	Position
J.League	Runners-up / 16 clubs
Emperor's Cup	3rd round
J.League Cup	GL-B 7th / 8 clubs
Super Cup	Champions
Suntory Cup	Champions
Asian Cup Winners' Cup	Runners-up

== Domestic results ==
=== J.League ===
16 March 1996 1	Nagoya Grampus Eight	4–1	Bellmare Hiratsuka	Nagoya Mizuho Athletics Stadium
15:03 JST (UTC+09)	Stojković 20'; Kina 47'; Asano 66'; Mochizuki 77'	J. League	Sorimachi 82'	Attendance: 22,021; Referee: Shinichirō Obata; Assistant referees: Morihisa Yamaguchi, Akihisa Makino; Fourth official: Tsuyoshi Ogura

20 March 1996 2	Kashiwa Reysol	2–3 (V-goal) (a.e.t.)	Nagoya Grampus Eight	Tokyo National Stadium
15:04 JST (UTC+09)	Edílson 38'; Yokoyama 60'	J. League	Hirano 6'; Stojković 12'; Moriyama 109'	Attendance: 25,948; Referee: Yoshimi Ogawa; Assistant referees: Mitsuru Satō, Naoyuki Mori; Fourth official: Hide Lii

23 March 1996 3	Nagoya Grampus Eight	3–1	Avispa Fukuoka	Nagoya Mizuho Athletics Stadium
19:02 JST (UTC+09)	Moriyama 2', 12'; Hirano 57'	J. League	Troglio 45'	Attendance: 20,793; Referee: Fumikazu Shioyazono; Assistant referees: Hiroyuki Izumi, Masatoshi Shibata; Fourth official: Motoyoshi Matsumoto

30 March 1996 4	Yokohama Marinos	0–1	Nagoya Grampus Eight	Yokohama Mitsuzawa Football Stadium
15:05 JST (UTC+09)		J. League	Durix 2'	Attendance: 12,013; Referee: Zoran Petrović; Assistant referees: Kazuaki Hamaguchi, Takuji Fukazawa; Fourth official: Haruo Suzuki

3 April 1996 5	Nagoya Grampus Eight	1–2	Júbilo Iwata	Nagoya Mizuho Athletics Stadium
19:01 JST (UTC+09)	Mochizuki 72'	J. League	Takeda 76'; Fujita 78'	Attendance: 21,576; Referee: Hiroyuki Umemoto; Assistant referees: Sōichirō Kaneko, Kazuhiko Matsumura; Fourth official: Yūji Kōda

6 April 1996 6	Urawa Red Diamonds	0–2	Nagoya Grampus Eight	Urawa Komaba Stadium
14:02 JST (UTC+09)		J. League	Asano 61'; Moriyama 89'	Attendance: 19,608; Referee: Yoshimi Ogawa; Assistant referees: Akihisa Makino, Hitoshi Nakagomi; Fourth official: Akio Hayashi

13 April 1996 7	Nagoya Grampus Eight	2–0	Gamba Osaka	Nagoya Mizuho Athletics Stadium
15:03 JST (UTC+09)	Hirano 3'; Stojković 72'	J. League		Attendance: 22,105; Referee: Yasuhiro Matsuzaki; Assistant referees: Yoshikazu Hiroshima, Ichirō Inukai; Fourth official: Takafumi Igarashi

17 April 1996 8	Nagoya Grampus Eight	3–1	Verdy Kawasaki	Nagoya Mizuho Athletics Stadium
19:04 JST (UTC+09)	Okayama 2'; Olivier 21'; Stojković 54'	J. League	56' (o.g.)	Attendance: 22,613; Referee: Kazuo Kakihana; Assistant referees: Morihisa Yamaguchi, Satoru Ishizawa; Fourth official: Yūki Noda

20 April 1996 9	JEF United Ichihara	3–0	Nagoya Grampus Eight	Niigata Stadium
15:03 JST (UTC+09)	Ejiri 58'; 66' (o.g.); Maslovar 78'	J. League		Attendance: 10,156; Referee: Yoshitsugu Katayama; Assistant referees: Noboru Ishiyama, Masaaki Shimomura; Fourth official: Hiroshi Abe

27 April 1996 10	Cerezo Osaka	3–2 (V-goal) (a.e.t.)	Nagoya Grampus Eight	Osaka Nagai No.2 Stadium
14:03 JST (UTC+09)	Kanda 13' 119'; Morishima 19'	J. League	Durix 47'; Moriyama 85'	Attendance: 11,046; Referee: Kiyoshi Ōta; Assistant referees: Kazuaki Hamaguchi, Akio Okutani; Fourth official: Tamotsu Ōnishi

1 May 1996 11	Nagoya Grampus Eight	3–1	Kashima Antlers	Nagoya Mizuho Athletics Stadium
19:01 JST (UTC+09)	12' (o.g.); Stojković 17', 31'	J. League	Mazinho 38'	Attendance: 21,438; Referee: Piotr Werner; Assistant referees: Naoki Esumi, Hiroyuki Ōnishi; Fourth official: Tsutomu Suda

4 May 1996 12	Nagoya Grampus Eight	2–3	Yokohama Flügels	Gifu Nagaragawa Stadium
15:03 JST (UTC+09)	Moriyama 77'; Iijima 89'	J. League	Maezono 37', 55'; Zinho 80'	Attendance: 23,861; Referee: Naotsugu Fuse; Assistant referees: Yasushi Tsuchimoto, Takao Onshi; Fourth official: Katsuyasu Masui

11 May 1996 13	Shimizu S-Pulse	1–4	Nagoya Grampus Eight	Nagasaki Stadium
15:00 JST (UTC+09)	Y. Matsubara 64'	J. League	Stojković 26'; Okayama 49'; Hirano 66'; Durix 77'	Attendance: 7,348; Referee: Yasuhiro Matsuzaki; Assistant referees: Hideaki Harada, Masatoshi Shibata; Fourth official: Shigehisa Yamaguchi

15 May 1996 14	Nagoya Grampus Eight	1–2	Sanfrecce Hiroshima	Nagoya Mizuho Athletics Stadium
19:03 JST (UTC+09)	Stojković 64'	J. League	Huistra 69'; Takagi 80'	Attendance: 21,303; Referee: Shinichirō Obata; Assistant referees: Kazuya Yanagisawa, Ichirō Inukai; Fourth official: Yasuhiro Takeichi

18 May 1996 15	Kyoto Purple Sanga	2–3	Nagoya Grampus Eight	Tottori Stadium
17:05 JST (UTC+09)	Y. Satō 8'; Noguchi 24'	J. League	Asano 44'; Moriyama 47'; Stojković 60'	Attendance: 9,023; Referee: Hiroyuki Umemoto; Assistant referees: Kōji Minami, Hiroyuki Izumi; Fourth official: Jun Kagemoto

28 August 1996 16	Yokohama Flügels	1–2	Nagoya Grampus Eight	Tokyo National Stadium
19:05 JST (UTC+09)	Sampaio 89'	J. League	Asano 24'; Durix 89'	Attendance: 30,128; Referee: Zoran Petrović; Assistant referees: Yū Nakamura, Akihisa Makino; Fourth official: Keizō Yamazaki

31 August 1996 17	Nagoya Grampus Eight	2–1	Shimizu S-Pulse	Nagoya Mizuho Athletics Stadium
19:05 JST (UTC+09)	Torres 28'; Hirano 56'	J. League	Y. Matsubara 37'	Attendance: 21,008; Referee: Bemard Saules; Assistant referees: Naoyuki Mori, Kō Ōishi; Fourth official: Takao Wakahara

7 September 1996 18	Sanfrecce Hiroshima	2–3	Nagoya Grampus Eight	Hiroshima Big Arch
18:33 JST (UTC+09)	Takagi 12'; Fue 67'	J. League	Okayama 44'; Moriyama 70'; Stojković 72'	Attendance: 10,185; Referee: Hiroshi Tanabe; Assistant referees: Akio Okutani, Takashi Aoki; Fourth official: Keiichi Nadamoto

14 September 1996 19	Nagoya Grampus Eight	3–0	Kyoto Purple Sanga	Nagoya Mizuho Athletics Stadium
16:05 JST (UTC+09)	Okayama 72'; Moriyama 75'; Asano 87'	J. League		Attendance: 21,181; Referee: Leslie Mottram; Assistant referees: Tōru Yamashiro, Masatoshi Shibata; Fourth official: Kōji Katō

21 September 1996 20	Bellmare Hiratsuka	2–3 (V-goal) (a.e.t.)	Nagoya Grampus Eight	Hiratsuka Stadium
15:01 JST (UTC+09)	Seki 44'; Betinho 88'	J. League	Okayama 8', 41' 104'	Attendance: 7,537; Referee: Hideo Kikuchi; Assistant referees: Masahiro Katagiri, Kenichi Koshiyama; Fourth official: Hiroshi Yamaguchi

28 September 1996 21	Nagoya Grampus Eight	1–2 (V-goal) (a.e.t.)	Kashiwa Reysol	Nagoya Mizuho Athletics Stadium
15:03 JST (UTC+09)	Moriyama 80'	J. League	N. Katō 44'; Katanosaka 93'	Attendance: 21,295; Referee: Hiroyuki Umemoto; Assistant referees: Naoki Esumi, Susumu Takeda; Fourth official: Yukiyoshi Miyashita

2 October 1996 22	Avispa Fukuoka	1–3	Nagoya Grampus Eight	Kumamoto Suizenji Stadium
19:00 JST (UTC+09)	Báez 56'	J. League	Mochizuki 12'; Durix 35'; 60' (o.g.)	Attendance: 7,247; Referee: Leslie Mottram; Assistant referees: Tōru Yamashiro, Kōji Taniuchi; Fourth official: Kōji Uehara

5 October 1996 23	Nagoya Grampus Eight	2–0	Yokohama Marinos	Nagoya Mizuho Athletics Stadium
19:33 JST (UTC+09)	Okayama 5'; Hirano 12'	J. League		Attendance: 21,984; Referee: Masayoshi Okada; Assistant referees: Morihisa Yamaguchi, Yū Nakamura; Fourth official: Toshiya Narita

16 October 1996 24	Júbilo Iwata	0–2	Nagoya Grampus Eight	Júbilo Iwata Stadium
19:00 JST (UTC+09)		J. League	Mochizuki 75'; Durix 85'	Attendance: 13,512; Referee: Kenji Tanaka; Assistant referees: Kazuya Yanagisawa, Toshimitsu Yoshida; Fourth official: Takuya Okada

19 October 1996 25	Nagoya Grampus Eight	0–1	Urawa Red Diamonds	Gifu Nagaragawa Stadium
15:00 JST (UTC+09)		J. League	27' (o.g.)	Attendance: 22,267; Referee: Zoran Petrović; Assistant referees: Yasushi Tsuchimoto, Hiroyuki Ōnishi; Fourth official: Katsuyasu Masui

26 October 1996 26	Gamba Osaka	0–3	Nagoya Grampus Eight	Ishikawa Kanazawa Stadium
15:04 JST (UTC+09)		J. League	Stojković 38'; Mochizuki 60'; Hirano 63'	Attendance: 13,517; Referee: Bemard Saules; Assistant referees: Hisaharu Kitamura, Kō Ōishi; Fourth official: Tsutomu Kaji

30 October 1996 27	Verdy Kawasaki	1–0	Nagoya Grampus Eight	Kawasaki Todoroki Stadium
19:04 JST (UTC+09)	K. Miura 73'	J. League		Attendance: 12,258; Referee: Shinichirō Obata; Assistant referees: Noboru Ishiyama, Susumu Takeda; Fourth official: Yasuhiro Mineshita

2 November 1996 28	Nagoya Grampus Eight	1–1 (V-goal) (a.e.t.) (4–2 p)	JEF United Ichihara	Nagoya Mizuho Athletics Stadium
15:03 JST (UTC+09)	Ōiwa 37'	J. League	Niimura 3'	Attendance: 20,679; Referee: Kiyoshi Ōta; Assistant referees: Akio Okutani, Kazuhiko Matsumura; Fourth official: Tsuyoshi Ogura
	Penalties
	(penalty scored) Durix; (penalty scored) Torres; (penalty scored) Nishigaya; (penalty scored) Iijima		(penalty scored) Rufer; (penalty scored) Hašek; (penalty missed) Ejiri; (penalty missed) Bosz

6 November 1996 29	Kashima Antlers	4–2	Nagoya Grampus Eight	Kashima Soccer Stadium
19:00 JST (UTC+09)	Manaka 29', 39'; Mazinho 65'; Sōma 66'	J. League	Torres 7'; Moriyama 85'	Attendance: 16,234; Referee: Leslie Mottram; Assistant referees: Toshiyuki Mayuzumi, Akihisa Makino; Fourth official: Kunihiro Ōtsuki

9 November 1996 30	Nagoya Grampus Eight	2–1	Cerezo Osaka	Nagoya Mizuho Athletics Stadium
14:30 JST (UTC+09)	Okayama 25'; Ogura 45'	J. League	Manoel 12'	Attendance: 21,358; Referee: Masayoshi Okada; Assistant referees: Kimio Izaki, Sōichirō Kaneko; Fourth official: Takao Shimizu

=== Emperor's Cup ===
1st Round	bye

2nd Round	bye

17 November 1996 3rd Round	Nagoya Grampus Eight	0–1	Cosmo Oil	Nagoya Mizuho Athletics Stadium
: JST (UTC+09)			? ?'	Attendance: 6,638

=== J.League Cup ===
1 June 1996 GL-B-1-1	Nagoya Grampus Eight	1–1	Yokohama Flügels	Nagoya Mizuho Athletics Stadium
16:04 JST (UTC+09)	Hirano 50'	J. League	Zinho 16'	Attendance: 21,713; Referee: Archundia; Assistant referees: Noboru Ishiyama, Masahiro Katagiri; Fourth official: Yukio Fujita

5 June 1996 GL-B-1-2	Yokohama Flügels	1–1 (2–2 agg.)	Nagoya Grampus Eight	Yokohama Mitsuzawa Football Stadium
19:00 JST (UTC+09)	Zinho 19'	J. League	Moriyama 83'	Attendance: 8,065; Referee: Yoshimi Ogawa; Assistant referees: Takashi Kunori, Hisaharu Kitamura; Fourth official: Katsunori Moriya

8 June 1996 GL-B-2-1	Verdy Kawasaki	4–0	Nagoya Grampus Eight	Niigata Stadium
19:01 JST (UTC+09)	Kitazawa 4'; Bismarck 12'; Nunobe 37'; Caíco 41'	J. League		Attendance: 14,208; Referee: Masayoshi Okada; Assistant referees: Mitsuru Satō, Masaaki Shimomura; Fourth official: Hiroshi Abe

12 June 1996 GL-B-2-2	Nagoya Grampus Eight	0–3 (0–7 agg.)	Verdy Kawasaki	Gifu Nagaragawa Stadium
19:00 JST (UTC+09)		J. League	Nunobe 24'; Fujiyoshi 87'; Ishizuka 88'	Attendance: 23,637; Referee: Piotr Werner; Assistant referees: Yasushi Tsuchimoto, Ichirō Inukai; Fourth official: Takahiko Sugiyama

15 June 1996 GL-B-3-1	Nagoya Grampus Eight	1–1	JEF United Ichihara	Nagoya Mizuho Athletics Stadium
16:04 JST (UTC+09)	Stojković 70'	J. League	Ejiri 89'	Attendance: 21,172; Referee: Shinichirō Obata; Assistant referees: Morihisa Yamaguchi, Kōji Minami; Fourth official: Noriaki Fukunaga

19 June 1996 GL-B-3-2	JEF United Ichihara	1–0 (2–1 agg.)	Nagoya Grampus Eight	Ichihara Stadium
19:01 JST (UTC+09)	Hašek 69'	J. League		Attendance: 6,023; Referee: Archundia; Assistant referees: Tetsu Karakida, Kō Ōishi; Fourth official: Atsushi Nakamura

22 June 1996 GL-B-4-1	Kashima Antlers	2–0	Nagoya Grampus Eight	Kashima Soccer Stadium
18:02 JST (UTC+09)	Kurosaki 6'; Mazinho 30'	J. League		Attendance: 15,612; Referee: Kenji Tanaka; Assistant referees: Hisaharu Kitamura, Keiji Kamiara; Fourth official: Shigemi Tominaga

26 June 1996 GL-B-4-2	Nagoya Grampus Eight	0–2 (0–4 agg.)	Kashima Antlers	Nagoya Mizuho Athletics Stadium
19:01 JST (UTC+09)		J. League	Leonardo 26'; Masuda 89'	Attendance: 19,929; Referee: Zoran Petrović; Assistant referees: Sōichirō Kaneko, Tōru Yamashiro; Fourth official: Tsuyoshi Ogura

29 June 1996 GL-B-5-1	Shimizu S-Pulse	2–0	Nagoya Grampus Eight	Nihondaira Sports Stadium
16:04 JST (UTC+09)	Oliva 20', 58'	J. League		Attendance: 19,283; Referee: Tatsumi Ōno; Assistant referees: Kazuhisa Osada, Hitoshi Nakagomi; Fourth official: Masakazu Hōjō

3 July 1996 GL-B-5-2	Nagoya Grampus Eight	6–1 (6–3 agg.)	Shimizu S-Pulse	Nagoya Mizuho Athletics Stadium
19:04 JST (UTC+09)	Okayama 4', 68'; Hirano 7', 42'; Tomasz 75'; Moriyama 84'	J. League	Oliva 69'	Attendance: 18,034; Referee: Yasuhiro Hemmi; Assistant referees: Kazuaki Hamaguchi, Hiroyuki Ōnishi; Fourth official: Kōta Kurimoto

10 August 1996 GL-B-6-1	Avispa Fukuoka	1–0	Nagoya Grampus Eight	Hakatanomori Football Stadium
18:31 JST (UTC+09)	Yamashita 84'	J. League		Attendance: 10,480; Referee: Naotsugu Fuse; Assistant referees: Naoki Esumi, Kazuhiko Matsumura; Fourth official: Syungo Matsufuji

14 August 1996 GL-B-6-2	Nagoya Grampus Eight	3–3 (3–4 agg.)	Avispa Fukuoka	Nagoya Mizuho Athletics Stadium
19:03 JST (UTC+09)	Asano 2'; Hirano 54'; Moriyama 76'	J. League	Yamashita 20'; Ishimaru 39'; Troglio 59'	Attendance: 17,611; Referee: Kenji Tanaka; Assistant referees: Naoyuki Mori, Akio Okutani; Fourth official: Hisao Sugata

17 August 1996 GL-B-7-1	Nagoya Grampus Eight	6–1	Cerezo Osaka	Gifu Nagaragawa Stadium
19:03 JST (UTC+09)	Stojković 10', 84'; Hirano 19'; Ogura 34', 43'; Moriyama 88'	J. League	Yonekura 48'	Attendance: 19,268; Referee: Keiichi Sunakawa; Assistant referees: Ichirō Inukai, Keiji Kamiara; Fourth official: Tatsuo Gotō

21 August 1996 GL-B-7-2	Cerezo Osaka	3–1 (4–7 agg.)	Nagoya Grampus Eight	Osaka Nagai Stadium
19:00 JST (UTC+09)	Nishizawa 35'; Morishima 77'; Manoel 84'	J. League	Asano 66'	Attendance: 7,129; Referee: Shinichirō Obata; Assistant referees: Kōji Taniuchi, Masaaki Shimomura; Fourth official: Tamotsu Ōnishi

=== Super Cup ===
9 March 1996	Yokohama Marinos	0–2	Nagoya Grampus Eight	Tokyo National Stadium
14:03 JST (UTC+09)		J. League	Okayama 29'; Fukuda 39'	Attendance: 39,570; Referee: Yoshimi Ogawa; Assistant referees: Noboru Ishiyama, Yū Nakamura; Fourth official: Tōru Kamikawa

=== Suntory Cup ===
13 November 1996 Semifinals	Shimizu S-Pulse	0–0 (V-goal) (a.e.t.) (1–3 p)	Nagoya Grampus Eight	Nihondaira Sports Stadium
19:00 JST (UTC+09)		J. League		Attendance: 15,285; Referee: Bemard Saules; Assistant referees: Kazuya Yanagisawa, Hideaki Harada; Fourth official: Yoshimi Ogawa
	Penalties
	(penalty scored) Sawanobori; (penalty missed) Santos; (penalty missed) Saitō; (penalty missed) Ōenoki		(penalty scored) Durix; (penalty missed) Torres; (penalty scored) Stojković; (penalty scored) Nishigaya

20 November 1996 Final	Nagoya Grampus Eight	1–0 (V-goal) (a.e.t.)	Kashima Antlers	Tokyo National Stadium
19:05 JST (UTC+09)	Stojković 110'	J. League		Attendance: 25,017; Referee: Leslie Mottram; Assistant referees: Morihisa Yamaguchi, Noboru Ishiyama; Fourth official: Yasuhiro Matsuzaki

== International results ==
=== Asian Cup Winners' Cup ===
1st Round	bye

11 September 1996 2nd Round-1	(Vietnam) Haiphong Police	1–1	(Japan) Nagoya Grampus Eight	Hai Phong, Vietnam
	? ?'		Fukuda ?'	Stadium: Hai Phong Center Stadium; Attendance: 5,000

18 September 1996 2nd Round-2	(Japan) Nagoya Grampus Eight	3–0 (4–1 agg.)	(Vietnam) Haiphong Police	Nagoya, Japan
	Mochizuki ?' (pen.); Fukuda ?'; Satō ?'			Stadium: Mizuho Rugby Stadium; Attendance: 2,449

9 October 1996 Quarterfinals-1	(Japan) Nagoya Grampus Eight	2–0	(Hong Kong) South China	Gifu, Japan
	Nakanishi ?'; Kina ?'			Stadium: Gifu Nagaragawa Stadium; Attendance: 1,566

22 October 1996 Quarterfinals-2	(Hong Kong) South China	2–2 (2–4 agg.)	(Japan) Nagoya Grampus Eight	Hong Kong
	? ?' ? ?'		Satō ?'; Olivier ?'	Stadium: Hong Kong Stadium; Attendance: 19,500

24 November 1996 Semifinals	(Japan) Nagoya Grampus Eight	5–0	(South Korea) Ulsan Hyundai	Riyadh
	Olivier ?'; Nakanishi ?'; Stojković ?'; Mochizuki ?'; Fukuda ?'			Stadium: King Fahd International Stadium; Attendance: 5,000

26 November 1996 Final	(Japan) Nagoya Grampus Eight	1–3	(Saudi Arabia) Al-Hilal	Riyadh
	Nakanishi ?'		? ?' ? ?' ? ?'	Stadium: King Fahd International Stadium; Attendance: 40,000

== Player statistics ==
No.	Pos	Nat	Player	Total		J.League		Emperor's Cup		J.League Cup		Super Cup		Suntory Cup		Asian Cup Winners' Cup	
No.	Pos	Nat	Player	Apps	Goals	Apps	Goals	Apps	Goals	Apps	Goals	Apps	Goals	Apps	Goals	Apps	Goals
	GK	(Japan) JPN	Yūji Itō	40	0	29	0	1	0	5	0	1	0	2	0	2	0
	GK	(Japan) JPN	Ken Ishikawa	10	0	1	0	0	0	9	0	0	0	0	0	0	0
	GK	(Japan) JPN	Hiroki Mizuhara	3	0	0	0	0	0	0	0	0	0	0	0	3	0
	GK	(Japan) JPN	Seiji Honda	1	0	0	0	0	0	0	0	0	0	0	0	1	0
	DF	(Brazil) BRA	Torres	48	2	29	2	1	0	13	0	1	0	2	0	2	0
	DF	(Japan) JPN	Kazuhisa Iijima	46	1	29	1	1	0	11	0	1	0	2	0	2	0
	DF	(Japan) JPN	Seiichi Ogawa	37	0	26	0	0	0	10	0	1	0	0	0	0	0
	DF	(Japan) JPN	Masaru Hirayama	1	0	0	0	0	0	0	0	0	0	0	0	1	0
	DF	(Japan) JPN	Gō Ōiwa	45	1	27	1	1	0	12	0	1	0	2	0	2	0
	DF	(Japan) JPN	Mitsunori Yamao	1	0	0	0	0	0	0	0	0	0	0	0	1	0
	DF	(Japan) JPN	Takayuki Nishigaya	29	0	13	0	1	0	7	0	0	0	2	0	6	0
	DF	(Japan) JPN	Kei Taniguchi	6	0	2	0	0	0	0	0	0	0	0	0	4	0
	DF	(Japan) JPN	Yasuaki Katō	9	0	1	0	0	0	3	0	0	0	0	0	5	0
	DF	(Japan) JPN	Mitsuru Mukōjima	6	0	0	0	0	0	0	0	0	0	0	0	6	0
	MF	(Federal Republic of Yugoslavia) YUG	Stojković	35	16	19	11	1	0	10	3	1	0	2	1	2	1
	MF	(France) FRA	Durix	37	6	24	6	0	0	10	0	1	0	2	0	0	0
	MF	(Japan) JPN	Tetsuya Asano	45	7	29	5	1	0	13	2	1	0	1	0	0	0
	MF	(Japan) JPN	Tetsuo Nakanishi	34	3	16	0	1	0	9	0	1	0	1	0	6	3
	MF	(Japan) JPN	Toshihiro Uchida	4	0	0	0	0	0	0	0	0	0	0	0	4	0
	MF	(Japan) JPN	Shigeyoshi Mochizuki	44	7	26	5	1	0	11	0	1	0	2	0	3	2
	MF	(Japan) JPN	Hiroyasu Ibata	0	0	0	0	0	0	0	0	0	0	0	0	0	0
	MF	(Japan) JPN	Takashi Hirano	46	12	29	7	0	0	14	5	1	0	2	0	0	0
	MF	(Japan) JPN	Suguru Itō	0	0	0	0	0	0	0	0	0	0	0	0	0	0
	MF	(Japan) JPN	Tomoya Yamagami	4	0	0	0	0	0	0	0	0	0	0	0	4	0
	MF	(Japan) JPN	Tetsuhiro Kina	45	2	24	1	1	0	13	0	0	0	2	0	5	1
	MF	(Japan) JPN	Yusuke Satō	4	2	0	0	0	0	0	0	0	0	0	0	4	2
	FW	(Japan) JPN	Yasuyuki Moriyama	45	15	26	11	1	0	14	4	1	0	2	0	1	0
	FW	(Japan) JPN	Takafumi Ogura	20	3	14	1	0	0	4	2	0	0	2	0	0	0
	FW	(Japan) JPN	Tetsuya Okayama	46	12	26	9	1	0	14	2	1	1	2	0	2	0
	FW	(Japan) JPN	Kenji Fukuda	12	4	4	0	1	0	2	0	1	1	0	0	4	3
	MF	(Ivory Coast) CIV	Olivier †	23	3	16	1	1	0	2	0	0	0	0	0	4	2
	FW	(Poland) POL	Tomasz †	7	1	0	0	0	0	7	1	0	0	0	0	0	0
	FW	(Japan) JPN	Kunihiko Shiotake †	2	0	0	0	0	0	0	0	0	0	0	0	2	0
	MF	(Japan) JPN	Yukio Shinbara †	1	0	0	0	0	0	0	0	0	0	0	0	1	0

- † player(s) joined the team after the opening of this season.

== Transfers ==
In:

No.	Pos.	Nation	Player
—	DF	JPN	Mitsunori Yamao (from Aichi Gakuin University)
—	DF	JPN	Takayuki Nishigaya (from University of Tsukuba)
—	MF	JPN	Shigeyoshi Mochizuki (from University of Tsukuba)
—	MF	JPN	Suguru Itō (from Kokushikan University)
—	MF	JPN	Yusuke Satō (from Omiya Higashi High School)
—	FW	JPN	Kenji Fukuda (from Narashino High School)

Out:

No.	Pos.	Nation	Player
—	GK	JPN	Akira Kawaguchi (to Fukushima FC)
—	DF	JPN	Yūji Sakakura (to Brummel Sendai)
—	DF	JPN	Toshiyuki Kosugi (to Brummel Sendai)
—	DF	JPN	Naoki Mori (to Vissel Kobe)
—	DF	JPN	Seiji Kami
—	DF	JPN	Otohiko Kiyono
—	DF	JPN	Seiji Kubo
—	DF	JPN	Mitsutoshi Tsushima
—	MF	JPN	Shigeo Sawairi (retired)
—	MF	FRA	Passi
—	MF	JPN	Hiroto Takahashi (retired)
—	MF	JPN	Makoto Yonekura (to Cerezo Osaka)
—	MF	JPN	Masashi Shimamura
—	MF	JPN	Junji Kawabata (to Seino Transportation)
—	MF	JPN	伊藤 亘
—	FW	JPN	Takaki Kanda (retired)

== Transfers during the season ==
=== In ===
- (Ivory Coast) Sié Donald Olivier (on March)
- (Poland) Tomasz Frankowski (on May)
- (Japan) Kunihiko Shiotake (Nagoya Grampus Eight youth)
- (Japan) Yukio Shinbara (Nagoya Grampus Eight youth)

=== Out ===
- (Poland) Tomasz Frankowski (on July)
- (Japan) Hiroyasu Ibata (to Honda Motor)

== Awards ==
- J.League Best XI: (Federal Republic of Yugoslavia) Stojković

== Other pages ==
- (in Japanese) J. League official site
- (in Japanese) Nagoya Grampus official site
