= 1991–92 AJ Auxerre season =

AJ Auxerre
1991–92 season
- President: Jean-Claude Hamel
- Head coach: Guy Roux
- Stadium: Stade de l'Abbé-Deschamps
- Division 1: 4th
- Coupe de France: Round of 32
- UEFA Cup: Second round
- Top goalscorer: League: Christophe Cocard (9); All: Christophe Cocard (10)
Home colours	Away colours

The 1991–92 season was the 87th season in the history of AJ Auxerre and the club's 12th consecutive season in the second division of French football. In addition to the domestic league, Auxerre participated in this season's edition of the Coupe de France and the UEFA Cup.

== Competitions ==
=== Overall record ===
Competition	First match	Last match	Starting round	Final position	Record							
Competition	First match	Last match	Starting round	Final position	Pld	W	D	L	GF	GA	GD	Win %
Division 1	20 July 1991	1 May 1992	Matchday 1	4th	38	16	12	10	55	32	+23	42.11
Coupe de France	23 February 1992	13 March 1992	Round of 64	Round of 32	2	1	1	0	4	2	+2	50.00
UEFA Cup	17 September 1991	6 November 1991	First round	Second round	4	3	0	1	8	4	+4	75.00
Total					44	20	13	11	67	38	+29	45.45

Source: Competitions

=== Division 1 ===
==== League table ====
Pos	Team	Pld	W	D	L	GF	GA	GD	Pts	Qualification or relegation
2	Monaco	38	22	8	8	55	33	+22	52	Qualification to Cup Winners' Cup first round (Note: Monaco qualified for the 1992–93 European Cup Winners' Cup as finalists of the 1991–92 Coupe de France.)
3	Paris Saint-Germain	38	15	17	6	43	27	+16	47	Qualification to UEFA Cup first round
4	Auxerre	38	16	12	10	55	32	+23	44	Qualification to UEFA Cup first round
5	Caen	38	17	10	11	45	44	+1	44	Qualification to UEFA Cup first round
6	Montpellier	38	12	18	8	40	32	+8	42	

Rules for classification: 1) points; 2) goal difference; 3) number of goals scored.
Victory: 2 points, Draw: 1 point, Defeat: 0 points
Notes:

Promoted from Ligue 2, who will play in Division 1 season 1992/1993

- Bordeaux:Champion of Division 2, winner of Division 2 group B
- Valenciennes FC:Runner-up, winner of Division 2 group A
- RC Strasbourg:Third place, winner of barrages against Stade Rennais

==== Results summary ====
Overall								Home						Away					
Pld	W	D	L	GF	GA	GD	Pts	W	D	L	GF	GA	GD	W	D	L	GF	GA	GD
38	16	12	10	55	32	+23	60	14	5	0	42	10	+32	2	7	10	13	22	−9

Source: French Division 1

==== Results by round ====
Round	1	2	3	4	5	6	7	8	9	10	11	12	13	14	15	16	17	18	19	20	21	22	23	24	25	26	27	28	29	30	31	32	33	34	35	36	37	38
Ground	H	A	H	A	H	A	H	A	H	A	A	H	A	H	A	H	A	H	A	H	A	H	A	H	A	H	A	H	H	A	H	A	H	A	H	A	H	A
Result	W	D	W	L	D	L	W	D	W	L	L	D	L	W	D	D	D	W	L	D	W	W	D	W	W	W	D	W	D	L	W	L	W	L	W	L	W	D
Position	2	3	2	6	7	10	6	7	5	6	8	10	12	9	9	8	7	7	8	9	8	6	7	6	6	4	5	3	3	4	4	4	4	4	4	5	4	4

Source: Division 1
A = Away; H = Home; W = Win; D = Draw; L = Loss

==== Matches ====
20 July 1991 1	Auxerre	3–1	Rennes	Auxerre

27 July 1991 2	Paris Saint-Germain	1–1	Auxerre	Paris

31 July 1991 3	Auxerre	1–0	Toulon	Auxerre

3 August 1991 4	Caen	1–0	Auxerre	Caen

10 August 1991 5	Auxerre	0–0	Nîmes	Auxerre

17 August 1991 6	Sochaux	1–0	Auxerre	Montbéliard

24 August 1991 7	Auxerre	3–0	Toulouse	Auxerre

28 August 1991 8	Saint-Étienne	1–1	Auxerre	Saint-Étienne

7 September 1991 9	Auxerre	1–0	Lens	Auxerre

12 September 1991 10	Metz	2–1	Auxerre	Metz

21 September 1991 11	Nantes	2–0	Auxerre	Nantes

27 September 1991 12	Auxerre	1–1	Marseille	Auxerre

5 October 1991 13	Le Havre	1–0	Auxerre	Le Havre

18 October 1991 14	Auxerre	3–1	Nancy	Auxerre

26 October 1991 15	Montpeller	1–1	Auxerre	Montpellier

31 October 1991 16	Auxerre	1–1	Monaco	Auxerre

9 November 1991 17	Cannes	1–1	Auxerre	Cannes

16 November 1991 18	Auxerre	3–0	Lyon	Auxerre

23 November 1991 19	Lille	1–0	Auxerre	Lille

30 November 1991 20	Auxerre	2–2	Paris Saint-Germain	Auxerre

7 December 1991 21	Toulon	0–3	Auxerre	Toulon

14 December 1991 22	Auxerre	5–1	Caen	Auxerre

18 December 1991 23	Nîmes	0–0	Auxerre	Nîmes

21 December 1991 24	Auxerre	4–0	Sochaux	Auxerre

18 January 1992 25	Toulouse	2–3	Auxerre	Toulouse

25 January 1992 26	Auxerre	2–0	Saint-Étienne	Auxerre

1 February 1992 27	Lens	0–0	Auxerre	Lens

7 February 1992 28	Auxerre	3–0	Metz	Auxerre

15 February 1992 29	Auxerre	2–2	Nantes	Auxerre

29 February 1992 30	Marseille	2–0	Auxerre	Marseille

7 March 1992 31	Auxerre	3–0	Le Havre	Auxerre

21 March 1992 32	Nancy	2–1	Auxerre	Tomblaine

28 March 1992 33	Auxerre	1–0	Montpellier	Auxerre

4 April 1992 34	Monaco	2–0	Auxerre	Monaco

11 April 1992 35	Auxerre	3–1	Cannes	Auxerre

18 April 1992 36	Lyon	1–0	Auxerre	Lyon

25 April 1992 37	Auxerre	1–0	Lille	Auxerre

1 May 1992 38	Rennes	1–1	Auxerre	Rennes

=== UEFA Cup ===
==== First round ====
17 September 1991 First leg	Ikast (Denmark)	0–1	(France) Auxerre	Ikast, Denmark
18:00				Stadium: Ikast Stadion; Attendance: 2,000

2 October 1991 Second leg	Auxerre (France)	5–1 (6–1 agg.)	(Denmark) Ikast	Auxerre
20:45				Stadium: Stade de l'Abbé-Deschamps; Attendance: 6,000
