= Mukojima =

Mukojima (Japanese: 向島) is a Japanese surname. It may refer to:

- Mitsuru Mukojima (向島 満, born 1976), Japanese footballer
- Tatsuru Mukojima (向島 建, born 1966), Japanese footballer
- Mukojima Islands, a subgroup of the Bonin Islands
- Mukojima, a former ward that is now part of the special ward of Sumida, Tokyo, Japan
  - Higashi-Mukōjima Station, a station named after the former ward
