= 1991–92 Coupe de France =

Tournament details
- Country: France

The 75th edition of the Coupe de France was held in 1991–92. For the first time since its creation, the final was unplayed due to 18 people being killed after a temporary stand collapsed during the semi-final game between SC Bastia and Olympique de Marseille. Thus, the trophy was not awarded that season.

== Round of 64 ==
Team 1	Score	Team 2
Sochaux (D1)	0–3	Monaco (D1)
Metz (D1)	0–2	Auxerre (D1)
Rennes (D1)	1–0	Nantes (D1)
Marseille (D1)	1–0	Bordeaux (D2)
Martigues (D2)	0–2	Montpellier (D1)
Istres (D2)	1–1 (a.e.t.) (4–3 p)	Lyon (D1)
Valenciennes (D2)	2–1	Lille (D1)
Sète (D3)	1–2	Cannes (D1)
Angoulême (D3)	0–2	Nancy (D1)
Boulogne (D3)	1–4	Paris Saint-Germain (D1)
Béziers (D4)	1–3	Toulon (D1)
Stade Poitevin (D3)	0–2	Toulouse (D1)
Noisy-le-Sec (D3)	0–4	Saint-Étienne (D1)
Vire (DH)	0–3	Le Havre (D1)
Colmar (DH)	0–3	Lens (D1)
Pont-l'Abbé (DH)	0–2	Caen (D1)
Choisy-le-Roi (DHR)	0–2	Nîmes (D1)
Alès (D2)	0–0 (a.e.t.) (4–3 p)	Perpignan (D2)
Bourges (D2)	2–1	Laval (D2)
Châteauroux (D2)	0–2	Guingamp (D2)
Mulhouse (D2)	2–0	Rouen (D2)
Pau (D3)	2–1	La Roche (D2)
Nice (D2)	1–0	Valence (D3)
Angers (D2)	1–0	Thouars (D3)
Dunkerque (D2)	3–1	Saint-Dié (D4)
Château-Thierry (DH)	2–3 (a.e.t.)	Gazélec Ajaccio (D2)
Cambrai (DH)	0–3	Red Star (D2)
Fesches-le-Châtel (DH)	0–1	Bastia (D2)
Troyes (D3)	2–0	Saint-Priest (D3)
Lorient (D3)	3–1	Joué-lès-Tours (D4)
Marcq-en-Barœul (PH)	0–4	Saint-Omer (D3)
Massy 91 (PH)	1–0	Brive (D3)

== Round of 32 ==
Team 1	Score	Team 2
Auxerre (D1)	2–2 (a.e.t.) (1–4 p)	Monaco (D1)
Caen (D1)	5–4 (a.e.t.)	Lens (D1)
Montpellier (D1)	2–0	Rennes (D1)
Nancy (D1)	3–2	Paris Saint-Germain (D1)
Dunkerque (D2)	0–3	Saint-Étienne (D1)
Istres (D2)	1–2	Marseille (D1)
Le Havre (D1)	0–1 (a.e.t.)	Bourges (D2)
Bastia (D2)	2–0	Toulouse (D1)
Gazélec Ajaccio (D2)	1–0	Toulon (D1)
Cannes (D1)	3–1 (a.e.t.)	Angers (D2)
Pau (D3)	3–3 (a.e.t.) (5–4 p)	Nîmes (D1)
Alès (D2)	0–0 (a.e.t.) (4–5 p)	Red Star (D2)
Mulhouse (D2)	1–1 (a.e.t.) (4–5 p)	Guingamp (D2)
Lorient (D3)	0–3	Valenciennes (D2)
Massy 91 (PH)	1–2	Nice (D2)
Saint-Omer (D3)	0–0 (a.e.t.) (3–2 p)	Troyes (D3)

== Round of 16 ==
Team 1	Score	Team 2
Cannes (D1)	2–1 (a.e.t.)	Montpellier (D1)
Valenciennes (D2)	0–2	Marseille (D1)
Nancy (D1)	2–1	Bourges (D2)
Gazélec Ajaccio (D2)	2–1	Saint-Étienne (D2)
Caen (D1)	0–0 (a.e.t.) (5–3 p)	Pau (D3)
Saint-Omer (D3)	2–4	Monaco (D1)
Nice (D2)	0–1	Bastia (D2)
Red Star (D2)	2–1 (a.e.t.)	Guingamp (D2)

== Quarter-finals ==
22 April 1992	Caen (1)	1–3	Marseille (1)	Caen
	Dangbeto 14'		Sauzée 44' (pen.); Papin 47'; Pelé 58'	Stadium: Stade de Venoix; Attendance: 11,568; Referee: Marcel Lainé

22 April 1992	Gazélec Ajaccio (2)	0–3	Monaco (1)	Ajaccio
			Gnako 50'; Sivebaek 61'; Passi 76'	Stadium: Stade Mezzavia; Attendance: 10,000; Referee: Jean-Marie Lartigot

22 April 1992	Bastia (2)	0–0 (a.e.t.) (3–0 p)	Nancy (1)	Bastia
				Stadium: Stade Furiani; Attendance: 8,737; Referee: Rémi Harrel
	Penalties
	Taberner (penalty scored); Mangione (penalty scored); Burnier (penalty scored)

22 April 1992	Cannes (1)	1–0 (a.e.t.)	Red Star (2)	Lyon
	Omam-Biyik 92'			Stadium: Stade de Gerland; Attendance: 1,179; Referee: Antoine De Pandis

== Semi-finals ==
28 April 1992	Cannes (1)	0–0 (a.e.t.) (3–5 p)	Monaco (1)	Cannes
				Stadium: Stade Pierre de Coubertin; Attendance: 5,000; Referee: Gérard Biguet
	Penalties
	Langers (penalty scored); Koot (penalty missed); Ravera (penalty scored); Durix (penalty scored)		(penalty scored) Passi; (penalty scored) Djorkaeff; (penalty scored) Gnako; (penalty scored) Weah; (penalty scored) Petit

5 May 1992	Bastia (2)	Cancelled	Marseille (1)	Bastia
		Report		Stadium: Stade Furiani; Attendance: N/A; Referee: N/A
Note: The match was not played due to the Furiani disaster which happened before the match.
