= Toshihiro Uchida =

Japanese footballer

Toshihiro Uchida 内田 利広
Personal information
- Full name: Toshihiro Uchida
- Date of birth: August 12, 1972 (age 54)
- Place of birth: Nagasaki, Japan
- Height: 1.74 m (5 ft 8 1/2 in)
- Position: Midfielder

Youth career
- 1988–1990: Kunimi High School
- 1991–1994: Meiji University

Senior career*
Years	Team	Apps	(Gls)
1995–1996	Nagoya Grampus Eight	1	(0)
1997–2000	Cerezo Osaka	66	(1)
Total		67	(1)
Medal record
Nagoya Grampus Eight
Runner-up	J1 League	1996
Winner	Emperor's Cup	1995
- * Club domestic league appearances and goals

Toshihiro Uchida (内田 利広, Uchida Toshihiro; born August 12, 1972) is a former Japanese football player.

== Playing career ==
Uchida was born in Nagasaki Prefecture on August 12, 1972. After graduating from Meiji University, he joined Nagoya Grampus Eight in 1995. On April 22, he debuted against Kashima Antlers. However he could only play this match until 1996. In 1997, he moved to Cerezo Osaka. He played many matches as defensive midfielder. He retired end of 2000 season.

== Career statistics ==
Appearances and goals by club, season and competition
Club	Season	League			Emperor's Cup		J.League Cup		Total	
Club	Season	Division	Apps	Goals	Apps	Goals	Apps	Goals	Apps	Goals
Nagoya Grampus Eight	1995	J1 League	1	0	0	0	—		1	0
Nagoya Grampus Eight	1996	J1 League	0	0			0	0	0	0
Cerezo Osaka	1997	J1 League	23	1	0	0	2	0	25	1
Cerezo Osaka	1998	J1 League	2	0			3	0	5	0
Cerezo Osaka	1999	J1 League	28	0			4	0	32	0
Cerezo Osaka	2000	J1 League	13	0			1	0	14	0
Career total			67	1	0	0	10	0	77	1
