= Furiani disaster =

1992 French football stadium collapse

- Date: 5 May 1992
- Time: 20:23
- Venue: Stade Armand-Cesari
- Location: Furiani, Corsica, France; 42°39′5″N 9°26′34″E
- Cause: Collapse of a terrace
- Deaths: 18
- Injuries: 2,300

The Furiani disaster happened on 5 May 1992 at the Stade Armand-Cesari in Furiani, a commune near Bastia on the French island of Corsica. 18 people were killed when one of the stadium's terraces collapsed.

== Collapse ==
On that day, SC Bastia faced Olympique de Marseille for a semi-final match in the Coupe de France. Marseille was unarguably the best team in France at the time, and the board of Bastia wanted to take advantage of it by adding a large-capacity stand, to increase the number of seats by 50%. Local authorities approved the project without restrictions.

The announcer had repeatedly asked the fans not to stamp their feet on the stands, but they disobeyed this order.

Before the game, the stand collapsed, killing 18 and leaving over 2,300 injured.

Structural problems, such as instability, were noticeable in the hour before the match. The structure collapsed at 20:23 CEST, shortly before the scheduled start of the match. Supporters and media were trapped in the wreckage. The match was never played. All medical resources on the island were fully committed to dealing with the injured and many of the victims were eventually evacuated to the mainland; the airport was reported as resembling a field hospital.

== Investigation ==
An investigation was opened into the disaster. The investigation concluded there had been a number of violations of rules concerning the construction of the temporary terrace, and in the management of ticketing, and that the attitude of sporting and municipal executives had been problematic.

The report concluded "Le soir du 5 mai, il n'y a pas eu de fatalité" (transl. On the evening of 5 May there was no fatality). After a trial a number of those found responsible served short sentences.

== Later developments ==
Since the disaster, Armand-Césari slowly improved, leaving only one of the four stands from 1992. This "under construction" stadium surprised the players from S.L. Benfica in 1997, as they believed this was the training pitch. Some major improvements finally started at the end of 1996, for a final capacity of 18,000.
