= Mitsuru Mukojima =

Japanese footballer

Mitsuru Mukojima 向島 満
Personal information
- Full name: Mitsuru Mukojima
- Date of birth: May 5, 1976 (age 50)
- Place of birth: Fujieda, Shizuoka, Japan
- Height: 1.77 m (5 ft 9 1/2 in)
- Position: Defender

Youth career
- 1992–1994: Shizuoka Gakuen High School

Senior career*
| Years | Team | Apps | (Gls) |
| 1995–1997 | Nagoya Grampus Eight | 1 | (0) |
| 1998–2006 | Honda | 233 | (9) |
| Total | | 234 | (9) |
Medal record
Nagoya Grampus Eight
| Runner-up | J1 League | 1996 |
| Winner | Emperor's Cup | 1995 |
- * Club domestic league appearances and goals

Mitsuru Mukojima (向島 満, Mukojima Mitsuru; born May 5, 1976) is a former Japanese football player.

== Playing career ==
Mukojima was born in Fujieda on May 5, 1976. After graduating from Shizuoka Gakuen High School, he joined Nagoya Grampus Eight in 1995. On August 9, 1997, he debuted against Kashima Antlers. However he could hardly play in the match in 3 seasons until 1997. In 1998, he moved to Honda. He became a regular player and the club won the champions in 2001, 2002 and 2006. He retired at the end of the 2006 season.

== Career statistics ==
Appearances and goals by club, season and competition
| Club | Season | League | | | Emperor's Cup | | J.League Cup | | Total | |
| Club | Season | Division | Apps | Goals | Apps | Goals | Apps | Goals | Apps | Goals |
|---|---|---|---|---|---|---|---|---|---|---|
| Nagoya Grampus Eight | 1995 | J1 League | 0 | 0 | 0 | 0 | - | | 0 | 0 |
| Nagoya Grampus Eight | 1996 | J1 League | 0 | 0 | 0 | 0 | 0 | 0 | 0 | 0 |
| Nagoya Grampus Eight | 1997 | J1 League | 1 | 0 | 0 | 0 | 1 | 0 | 2 | 0 |
| Honda | 1998 | Football League | 30 | 1 | 3 | 0 | - | | 33 | 1 |
| Honda | 1999 | Football League | 24 | 1 | 3 | 0 | - | | 27 | 1 |
| Honda | 2000 | Football League | 16 | 2 | 3 | 0 | - | | 19 | 2 |
| Honda | 2001 | Football League | 29 | 1 | 3 | 0 | - | | 32 | 1 |
| Honda | 2002 | Football League | 16 | 0 | 3 | 0 | - | | 19 | 0 |
| Honda | 2003 | Football League | 29 | 0 | 3 | 1 | - | | 32 | 1 |
| Honda | 2004 | Football League | 30 | 1 | 3 | 1 | - | | 33 | 2 |
| Honda | 2005 | Football League | 30 | 2 | 1 | 0 | - | | 31 | 2 |
| Honda | 2006 | Football League | 29 | 1 | 1 | 0 | - | | 30 | 1 |
| Career total | | | 234 | 9 | 23 | 2 | 1 | 0 | 258 | 11 |
