= Osamu Hirose =

Japanese footballer

Osamu Hirose 広瀬 治
Personal information
- Full name: Osamu Hirose
- Date of birth: June 6, 1965 (age 61)
- Place of birth: Saitama, Japan
- Height: 1.76 m (5 ft 9 1/2 in)
- Position: Midfielder

Youth career
- 1981–1983: Teikyo High School

Senior career*
| Years | Team | Apps | (Gls) |
| 1984–2000 | Urawa Red Diamonds | 326 | (31) |
| Total | | 326 | (31) |
- * Club domestic league appearances and goals

Osamu Hirose (広瀬 治, Hirose Osamu; born June 6, 1965) is a former Japanese football player.

His son Rikuto is also a footballer.

== Playing career ==
Hirose was born in Saitama on June 6, 1965. After graduating from high school, he joined Japan Soccer League club Mitsubishi Motors (later Urawa Reds) in 1984. He played many matches as offensive midfielder in first season, and became a regular player from next season. The club also won the 3rd place 1986–87 and 1987–88 season. After that, the club performance was sluggish for long time. In 1992, Japan Soccer League was folded and founded new league J1 League. However the club finished at bottom place in 1993 and 1994 season. In 1995, he was converted to defensive midfielder by new manager Holger Osieck and the club finished at 4th place. He retired end of 2000 season. He played 326 matches and scored 31 goals for the club in 17 seasons.

== Career statistics ==
Appearances and goals by club, season and competition
| Club | Season | League | | | Emperor's Cup | | J.League Cup | | Total | |
| Club | Season | Division | Apps | Goals | Apps | Goals | Apps | Goals | Apps | Goals |
|---|---|---|---|---|---|---|---|---|---|---|
| Mitsubishi Motors | 1984 | JSL Division 1 | 13 | 1 | 1 | 1 | 2 | 0 | 16 | 2 |
| Mitsubishi Motors | 1985/86 | JSL Division 1 | 20 | 5 | 3 | 1 | 2 | 0 | 25 | 6 |
| Mitsubishi Motors | 1986/87 | JSL Division 1 | 22 | 0 | 2 | 2 | 2 | 0 | 26 | 2 |
| Mitsubishi Motors | 1987/88 | JSL Division 1 | 15 | 2 | 1 | 0 | 3 | 0 | 19 | 2 |
| Mitsubishi Motors | 1988/89 | JSL Division 1 | 16 | 0 | 2 | 0 | 3 | 1 | 21 | 1 |
| Mitsubishi Motors | 1989/90 | JSL Division 2 | 25 | 6 | 1 | 0 | 0 | 0 | 26 | 6 |
| Mitsubishi Motors | 1990/91 | JSL Division 1 | 18 | 1 | 2 | 0 | 1 | 0 | 21 | 1 |
| Mitsubishi Motors | 1991/92 | JSL Division 1 | 18 | 3 | 2 | 0 | 1 | 0 | 21 | 3 |
| Urawa Red Diamonds | 1992 | J1 League | — | | 3 | 2 | 7 | 0 | 10 | 2 |
| Urawa Red Diamonds | 1993 | J1 League | 26 | 2 | 2 | 0 | 1 | 1 | 29 | 3 |
| Urawa Red Diamonds | 1994 | J1 League | 18 | 4 | 0 | 0 | 2 | 0 | 20 | 4 |
| Urawa Red Diamonds | 1995 | J1 League | 49 | 2 | 2 | 0 | — | | 51 | 2 |
| Urawa Red Diamonds | 1996 | J1 League | 24 | 4 | 4 | 0 | 9 | 0 | 37 | 4 |
| Urawa Red Diamonds | 1997 | J1 League | 19 | 1 | 0 | 0 | 4 | 0 | 23 | 1 |
| Urawa Red Diamonds | 1998 | J1 League | 23 | 0 | 2 | 0 | 4 | 1 | 29 | 1 |
| Urawa Red Diamonds | 1999 | J1 League | 13 | 0 | 2 | 0 | 3 | 0 | 18 | 0 |
| Urawa Red Diamonds | 2000 | J2 League | 7 | 0 | 0 | 0 | 0 | 0 | 7 | 0 |
| Career total | | | 326 | 31 | 29 | 6 | 44 | 3 | 399 | 40 |
