= Masaki Tsuchihashi =

Japanese footballer

Masaki Tsuchihashi 土橋 正樹
Personal information
- Full name: Masaki Tsuchihashi
- Date of birth: July 23, 1972 (age 54)
- Place of birth: Yokohama, Kanagawa, Japan
- Height: 1.75 m (5 ft 9 in)
- Position: Midfielder

Youth career
- 1988–1990: Tohoku Gakuin High School
- 1991–1994: Kokushikan University

Senior career*
Years	Team	Apps	(Gls)
1995–2003	Urawa Reds	184	(5)
Total		184	(5)

International career
1996	Japan	1	(0)
Medal record
Urawa Reds
Winner	J.League Cup	2003
Runner-up	J.League Cup	2002
- * Club domestic league appearances and goals

Masaki Tsuchihashi (土橋 正樹, Tsuchihashi Masaki; born July 23, 1972) is a former Japanese football player. He played for Japan national team.

== Club career ==
Tsuchihashi was born in Yokohama on July 23, 1972. After graduating from Kokushikan University, he joined Urawa Reds in 1995. He played as a defensive midfielder from the first season. However his opportunity to play decreased from the late 1990s. He retired at the end of 2003 season.

== National team career ==
On May 26, 1996, Tsuchihashi debuted for Japan national team against Yugoslavia.

== Career statistics ==
=== Club ===
Appearances and goals by club, season and competition
Club	Season	League			Emperor's Cup		J.League Cup		Total	
Club	Season	Division	Apps	Goals	Apps	Goals	Apps	Goals	Apps	Goals
Urawa Reds	1995	J1 League	51	2	3	0	—		54	2
Urawa Reds	1996	J1 League	22	1	4	0	13	0	39	1
Urawa Reds	1997	J1 League	31	0	2	0	8	3	41	3
Urawa Reds	1998	J1 League	20	0	3	0	1	0	24	0
Urawa Reds	1999	J1 League	18	1	0	0	0	0	18	1
Urawa Reds	2000	J2 League	17	1	4	1	0	0	21	2
Urawa Reds	2001	J1 League	22	0	2	0	5	0	29	0
Urawa Reds	2002	J1 League	3	0	0	0	0	0	3	0
Urawa Reds	2003	J1 League	0	0	0	0	0	0	0	0
Career total			184	5	18	1	27	3	229	9

=== International ===
Japan national team
Year	Apps	Goals
1996	1	0
Total	1	0
