= Gérald Passi =

French footballer (born 1964)

Personal information
- Date of birth: 21 January 1964 (age 62)
- Place of birth: Albi, France
- Height: 1.74 m (5 ft 9 in)
- Position: Midfielder

Senior career*
Years	Team	Apps	(Gls)
1981–1985	Montpellier	72	(6)
1985–1990	Toulouse	148	(41)
1990–1992	Monaco	59	(10)
1992–1994	Saint-Étienne	63	(9)
1995	Nagoya Grampus Eight	25	(3)
Total		367	(69)

International career
1987–1988	France	11	(2)
- * Club domestic league appearances and goals

Gérald Passi (born 21 January 1964) is a French former professional footballer who played as a midfielder.

== Personal life ==
Passi was born in Albi, Tarn. He comes from a family of footballers. His father, Camille, was a Congolese former footballer, and coach in his later career. His brother, Franck, was also a professional footballer. His nephew, Bryan, is a professional footballer who has also played for Montpellier.

== Career statistics ==
=== Club ===
Appearances and goals by club, season and competition
Club	Season	League		
Club	Season	Division	Apps	Goals
Montpellier	1981–82	Division 1	4	0
Montpellier	1982–83	Division 2	16	1
Montpellier	1983–84	Division 2	29	2
Montpellier	1984–85	Division 2	23	3
Montpellier	Total		72	6
Toulouse	1985–86	Division 1	35	10
Toulouse	1986–87	Division 1	37	12
Toulouse	1987–88	Division 1	22	8
Toulouse	1988–89	Division 1	28	3
Toulouse	1989–90	Division 1	26	8
Toulouse	Total		148	41
Monaco	1990–91	Division 1	29	4
Monaco	1991–92	Division 1	30	6
Monaco	Total		59	10
Saint-Étienne	1992–93	Division 1	36	5
Saint-Étienne	1993–94	Division 1	14	2
Saint-Étienne	1994–95	Division 1	13	2
Saint-Étienne	Total		63	9
Nagoya Grampus Eight	1995	J1 League	25	3
Career total			367	69

=== International ===
Appearances and goals by national team and year
National team	Year	Apps	Goals
France	1987	4	0
France	1988	7	2
Total		11	2

== Honours ==
Monaco

- Coupe de France: 1991
- UEFA Cup Winners' Cup runner-up: 1992
