= Alexandre Torres =

Brazilian footballer (born 1966)

Personal information
- Full name: Carlos Alexandre Torres
- Date of birth: 22 August 1966 (age 60)
- Place of birth: Rio de Janeiro, Brazil
- Height: 1.87 m (6 ft 1 1/2 in)
- Position: Defender

Youth career
- 1980–1985: Fluminense

Senior career*
Years	Team	Apps	(Gls)
1985–1990	Fluminense	75	(3)
1991–1994	Vasco da Gama	42	(3)
1995–1999	Nagoya Grampus Eight	142	(11)
2000–2001	Vasco da Gama	10	(0)
Total		269	(17)

International career
1992	Brazil	1	(0)
- * Club domestic league appearances and goals

Carlos Alexandre Torres (born 22 August 1966), known as Alexandre Torres, is a Brazilian retired professional footballer who played as a defender. His father was former footballer Carlos Alberto Torres.

== Career ==
=== Club career ===
Torres played professionally in Brazil and Japan for Fluminense, Vasco da Gama and Nagoya Grampus Eight. At Nagoya Grampus he was signed by the manager Arsène Wenger, who seemed to recognise his agent's face from somewhere – bemused to find out it was his father and Brazil legend Carlos Alberto.

=== International career ===
Torres was called up to the Brazil national squad in 1992, making one international appearance.
