= Franck Durix =

French footballer (born 1965)

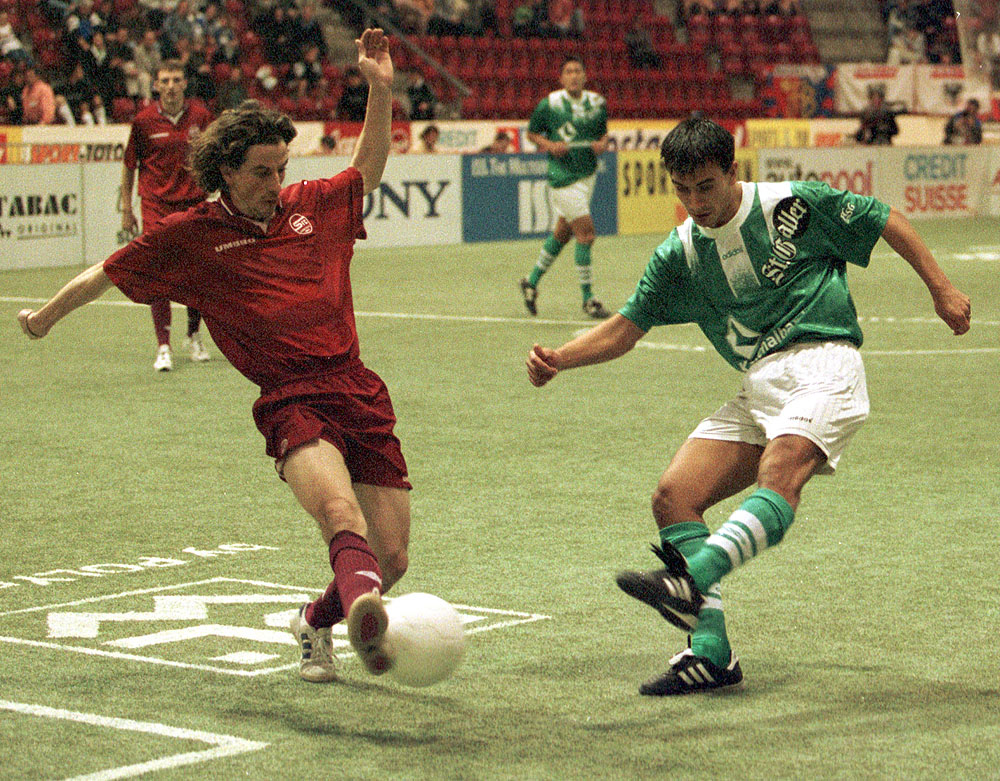

Personal information
- Date of birth: October 20, 1965 (age 61)
- Place of birth: Belleville, France
- Height: 1.75 m (5 ft 9 in)
- Position: Midfielder

Youth career
- 1979–1984: Belleville sur Saône

Senior career*
Years	Team	Apps	(Gls)
1984–1988	Olympique Lyonnais	104	(30)
1988–1995	Cannes	179	(13)
1995–1996	Nagoya Grampus Eight	72	(16)
1997–2000	Servette	77	(13)
2000–2001	Sochaux-Montbéliard	38	(3)
2001–2002	Cannes	29	(6)
- * Club domestic league appearances and goals

Franck Durix (born 20 October 1965) is a French former professional footballer. He is the brother of fellow player David Durix.

== Career ==
=== Club career ===
Beginning as an apprentice at Belleville sur Saône, Durix played professionally in France, Japan, and Switzerland for Olympique Lyonnais, Cannes, Nagoya Grampus Eight, Servette and Sochaux-Montbéliard.

=== International career ===
Durix was called up to the France national team in 1995, but never made an appearance for the national team.
