= Japan at the AFC Asian Cup =

Since the 1988 tournament, Japan has qualified for ten consecutive AFC Asian Cups from 1992 to 2027. Japan is also the most successful team in the tournament, with four titles.

Despite being a current football powerhouse in Asia, Japan was not considered a continental football power until 1988. Outside the 1968 Summer Olympics shock, Japan had been regarded as a weak team in the continent. In fact, Japan had missed eight first editions before qualifying in 1988. Yet, in qualifying for the 1988 edition, combined with hosting the 1992 AFC Asian Cup, Japanese football grew rapidly and soon replaced traditional powerhouses like South Korea, Iran and Saudi Arabia as the emerging and eventually, a dominant football power in Asia, although the recent rise of Australia has posed a challenge for Japan's dominant position.

== Overall record ==
AFC Asian Cup record									Qualification record					
Year	Result	Position	Pld	W	D	L	GF	GA	Pld	W	D	L	GF	GA
(Hong Kong) 1956	Withdrew								Withdrew					
(South Korea) 1960	Withdrew								Withdrew					
(Israel) 1964	Withdrew								Withdrew					
(Iran) 1968	Did not qualify								4	3	1	0	8	4
(Thailand) 1972	Withdrew								Withdrew					
(Iran) 1976	Did not qualify								5	2	1	2	4	4
(Kuwait) 1980	Withdrew								Withdrew					
(Singapore) 1984	Withdrew								Withdrew					
(Qatar) 1988	Group stage	10th	4	0	1	3	0	6	4	2	1	1	6	3
(Japan) 1992	Champions	1st	5	3	2	0	6	3	Qualified as hosts					
(United Arab Emirates) 1996	Quarter-finals	5th	4	3	0	1	7	3	Qualified as defending champions					
(Lebanon) 2000	Champions	1st	6	5	1	0	21	6	3	3	0	0	15	0
(China) 2004	Champions	1st	6	4	2	0	13	6	Qualified as defending champions					
(Indonesia) (Malaysia) (Thailand) (Vietnam) 2007	Fourth place	4th	6	2	3	1	11	7	6	5	0	1	15	2
(Qatar) 2011	Champions	1st	6	4	2	0	14	6	6	5	0	1	17	4
(Australia) 2015	Quarter-finals	5th	4	3	1	0	8	1	Qualified as defending champions					
(United Arab Emirates) 2019	Runners-up	2nd	7	6	0	1	12	6	8	7	1	0	27	0
(Qatar) 2023	Quarter-finals	6th	5	3	0	2	12	8	8	8	0	0	46	2
(Saudi Arabia) 2027	Qualified								6	6	0	0	24	0
Total	4 Titles	11/19	53	33	12	8	104	52	50	41	4	5	162	19

== 1988 AFC Asian Cup ==
Japan made debut at 1988 Asian Cup and it was the historical achievement that would put milestone for Japan to envision and develop its football, which was then-limited in amateur football. Japan entered the 1988 AFC Asian Cup and its qualifiers with a B team, made up mostly of university players, as the Japan Football Association kept the senior national team players at home for domestic league and cup competitions. In the whole tournament however, Japan ended up finishing last, with just one draw and three defeats, scoring zero goal and conceded six goals.

Team	Pts	Pld	W	D	L	GF	GA	GD
South Korea	8	4	4	0	0	9	2	+7
Iran	5	4	2	1	1	3	3	0
Qatar	4	4	2	0	2	7	6	+1
United Arab Emirates	2	4	1	0	3	2	4	−2
Japan	1	4	0	1	3	0	6	−6

4 December 1988
15:00

Japan	0–0	Iran
	Report

Qatar SC Stadium, Doha
Attendance: 4,000
Referee: Samuel Chan (Hong Kong)

6 December 1988
15:00

South Korea	2–0	Japan
Hwang Sun-Hong 13'; Kim Joo-Sung 35'	Report

Qatar SC Stadium, Doha
Referee: Salah Mohammed (Iraq)

10 December 1988
15:00

United Arab Emirates	1–0	Japan
A.A. Mohamed 86'	Report

Al-Ahly Stadium, Doha
Referee: Ahmad Bash (Jordan)

12 December 1988
17:00

Japan	0–3	Qatar
	Report	Khamis 58', 82'; Muftah 90'

Al-Ahly Stadium, Doha
Referee: Yusuf Namoğlu (Turkey)

Although it was not a successful tournament, qualifying to the Asian Cup had been the source of Japan's football renaissance in the country, and subsequent tournaments later would have proven this.

== 1992 AFC Asian Cup ==
Japan was the host of the 1992 tournament, and placed together with North Korea, Iran and the UAE. Japan was expected to pass through semi-finals only, however Japan had done even better than that.

Japan opened their account with two draws against the UAE and North Korea, before winning the first ever match in the Asian Cup, 1–0, over Iran, effectively eliminated Iran and North Korea. Japan kept firing by a 3–2 thrilling victory over China, before defeating Saudi Arabia 1–0 in the final. With the win, Japan claimed their first Asian title, marked the begin of a new Asian football power that would have a huge consequence for the next years.

Team	Pts	Pld	W	D	L	GF	GA	GD
Japan	5	3	1	2	0	2	1	+1
United Arab Emirates	5	3	1	2	0	2	1	+1
Iran	4	3	1	1	1	2	1	+1
North Korea	1	3	0	1	2	2	5	−3

30 October 1992
19:00

Japan	0–0	United Arab Emirates
	Report

Bingo Sports Park, Onomichi
Attendance: 10,000
Referee: Wei Jihong (China)

1 November 1992
14:00

Japan	1–1	North Korea
Nakayama 80'	Report	Kim Gwang-Min 29' (pen.)

Hiroshima Big Arch, Hiroshima
Attendance: 32,000
Referee: Rasheed Al-Jassas (Kuwait)

3 November 1992
14:00

Japan	1–0	Iran
Miura 87'	Report

Hiroshima Big Arch, Hiroshima
Attendance: 37,000
Referee: Jamal Al Sharif (Syria)

=== Knockout stage ===
Semi-finals

6 November 1992
16:30

Japan	3–2	China
Fukuda 48'; Kitazawa 57'; Nakayama 84'	Report	Xie Yuxin 1'; Li Xiao 70'

Hiroshima Stadium, Hiroshima
Attendance: 15,000
Referee: Hossein Khoshkhan (Iran)

Final

8 November 1992
14:30

Japan	1–0	Saudi Arabia
Takagi 36'	Report

Hiroshima Big Arch, Hiroshima
Attendance: 60,000
Referee: Jamal Al Sharif (Syria)

Ironically, in spite of the victory, Japan failed to qualify for 1994 World Cup, despite being Asian champion, and Hans Ooft, the manager who helped Japan win maiden Asian Cup, was fired later after the failure.

== 1996 AFC Asian Cup ==
Having won the previous edition, Japan was expected to become a contender for the Asian title twice. That's said, however, Japan's performance turned to be a great disappointment. Japan won all three matches in the group stage against Syria, China and Uzbekistan and won the group with full nine points. Even though their group stage performances were impressive, the quarter-final match against Kuwait proved to be a disaster when they lost 0–2, eventually ended Japan's hope to defend the title.

Team	Pts	Pld	W	D	L	GF	GA	GD
Japan	9	3	3	0	0	7	1	+6
China	3	3	1	0	2	3	3	0
Syria	3	3	1	0	2	3	6	−3
Uzbekistan	3	3	1	0	2	3	6	−3

6 December 1996
16:45

Japan	2–1	Syria
Abbas 85' (o.g.); Takagi 88'	Report	Jokhadar 8'

Tahnoun Bin Mohamed Stadium, Al Ain
Attendance: 10,000
Referee: Mohd Nazri Abdullah (Malaysia)

9 December 1996
16:45

Japan	4–0	Uzbekistan
Nanami 7'; Miura 37'; Maezono 86', 90'	Report

Tahnoun Bin Mohamed Stadium, Al Ain
Attendance: 3,000
Referee: Jalal Moradi (Iran)

12 December 1996
16:45

Japan	1–0	China
Soma 90'	Report

Tahnoun Bin Mohamed Stadium, Al Ain
Attendance: 2,000
Referee: Abdul Rahman Al-Zeid (Saudi Arabia)

=== Knockout stage ===
Quarter-finals

15 December 1996
19:30

Kuwait	2–0	Japan
Al-Huwaidi 17', 54'	Report

Tahnoun Bin Mohamed Stadium, Al Ain
Attendance: 2,000
Referee: Pirom Un-Prasert (Thailand)

Manager Shu Kamo was allowed to keep his job, but 1998 World Cup qualification under his tenure was not successful and he was replaced by Takeshi Okada, his assistant, for the remaining crucial matches. Japan would have qualified to the World Cup for the first time.

== 2000 AFC Asian Cup ==
Japan came to Lebanon 2000 with high hope to win the Asian Cup, having participated in their maiden World Cup in France. In there, Japan was placed with defending champions Saudi Arabia, Qatar and Uzbekistan. For Japan, the tournament was seen as perpetration for 2002 World Cup to be held in their home soil.

Japan proved to be so strong when they demolished defending champion Saudi Arabia 4–1 and Uzbekistan 8–1. After two matches, Japan drew Qatar 1–1. Qatar would go on to be the only team that didn't lose to Japan in the tournament. Japan kept on their impressive running by beating Iraq 4–1, China 3–2 before won the final against Saudi Arabia for the second times, 1–0. Japan claimed their second title and had officially established themselves as a new Asian football powerhouse.

Team	Pts	Pld	W	D	L	GF	GA	GD
Japan	7	3	2	1	0	13	3	+10
Saudi Arabia	4	3	1	1	1	6	4	+2
Qatar	3	3	0	3	0	2	2	0
Uzbekistan	1	3	0	1	2	2	14	−12

14 October 2000
17:00

Saudi Arabia	1–4	Japan
Morioka 90' (o.g.)	Report	Yanagisawa 22'; Takahara 37'; Nanami 53'; Ono 88'

Saida Municipal Stadium, Sidon
Attendance: 5,000
Referee: Ali Bujsaim (United Arab Emirates)

17 October 2000
17:00

Japan	8–1	Uzbekistan
Morishima 7'; Nishizawa 14', 25', 49'; Takahara 18', 20', 57'; Kitajima 79'	Report	Lushan 29'

Saida Municipal Stadium, Sidon
Attendance: 2,000
Referee: Shamsul Maidin (Singapore)

20 October 2000
19:30

Japan	1–1	Qatar
Nishizawa 61'	Report	Al-Obaidly 22'

Sports City Stadium, Beirut
Attendance: 2,000
Referee: Nabil Ayad (Lebanon)

=== Knockout stage ===
Quarter-finals

24 October 2000
16:45

Japan	4–1	Iraq
Nanami 8', 29'; Takahara 11'; Myojin 62'	Report	A. Obeid 4'

Sports City Stadium, Beirut
Attendance: 2,000
Referee: Tajaddin Fares (Syria)

Semi-finals

26 October 2000
19:45

China	2–3	Japan
Qi Hong 30'; Yang Chen 48'	Report	Fan Zhiyi 21' (o.g.); Nishizawa 53'; Myojin 61'

Sports City Stadium, Beirut
Attendance: 5,000
Referee: Shamsul Maidin (Singapore)

Final

29 October 2000
19:45

Japan	1–0	Saudi Arabia
Mochizuki 30'	Report

Sports City Stadium, Beirut
Attendance: 47,400
Referee: Ali Bujsaim (UAE)

This impressive running in 2000 Asian Cup proved to be useful for Japan two years later, when Japan passed through the group stage for the first time, before losing to later third-place Turkey 0–1 in the round of sixteen.

== 2004 AFC Asian Cup ==
Japan, having established themselves as a football powerhouse in the continent, was placed in Group D with Iran, Thailand and debutant Oman. Japan, however, had a hard beginning with just a 1–0 win to Oman, before demolished Thailand 4–1 next. Japan, like 2000 edition, drew the last match with Iran 0–0 and qualified to the quarter-finals when they faced up another debutant, Jordan. Jordan however proved to be a tough team when they held on Japan for 120 minutes with a 1–1 draw, before Japan won on the penalty shootout. In the semi-finals, Japan also needed 120 minutes to defeat another Arab team, Bahrain, in a 4–3 thriller.

In the final, Japan faced host China, and despite being thought to be even much harder than with Jordan and Bahrain since China was the host, Japan surprisingly defeated China 3–1 in just 90 minutes, including a hand goal from Koji Nakata, which was controversial aftermath. Thus, Japan for the second times won the title, continued to be the dominant force in Asia.

Team	Pts	Pld	W	D	L	GF	GA	GD
Japan	7	3	2	1	0	5	1	+4
Iran	5	3	1	2	0	5	2	+3
Oman	4	3	1	1	1	4	3	+1
Thailand	0	3	0	0	3	1	9	−8

20 July 2004
18:00

Japan	1–0	Oman
Nakamura 33'	Report

Chongqing Olympic Sports Center, Chongqing
Attendance: 35,000
Referee: Mark Shield (Australia)

24 July 2004
20:30

Thailand	1–4	Japan
Suksomkit 12'	Report	Nakamura 21'; Nakazawa 57', 87'; Fukunishi 68'

Chongqing Olympic Sports Center, Chongqing
Attendance: 45,000
Referee: Fareed Al-Marzouqi (UAE)

28 July 2004
18:15

Japan	0–0	Iran
	Report

Chongqing Olympic Sports Center, Chongqing
Attendance: 52,000
Referee: Mark Shield (Australia)

=== Knockout stage ===
Quarter-finals

31 July 2004
18:00

Japan	1–1 (a.e.t.)	Jordan
Suzuki 14'	Report	Shelbaieh 11'
Penalties
Nakamura (penalty missed); Alex (penalty missed); Fukunishi (penalty scored); Nakata (penalty scored); Suzuki (penalty scored); Nakazawa (penalty missed); Miyamoto (penalty scored)	4–3	(penalty scored) Abu Zema; (penalty scored) Al-Awadat; (penalty scored) Aqel; (penalty missed) Al-Shboul; (penalty missed) Ibrahim; (penalty missed) Al-Zboun; (penalty missed) Bani Yaseen

Chongqing Olympic Sports Center, Chongqing
Attendance: 52,000
Referee: Subkhiddin Mohd Salleh (Malaysia)

Semi-finals

3 August 2004
18:00

Bahrain	3–4 (a.e.t.)	Japan
A. Hubail 7', 71'; Naser 85'	Report	Nakata 48'; Tamada 55', 93'; Nakazawa 90'

Shandong Sports Center, Jinan
Attendance: 32,000
Referee: Shamsul Maidin (Singapore)

Final

7 August 2004
20:00

China	1–3	Japan
Li Ming 31'	Report	Fukunishi 22'; Nakata 65'; Tamada 90+1'

Workers Stadium, Beijing
Attendance: 62,000
Referee: Saad Kamil Al-Fadhli (Kuwait)

== 2007 AFC Asian Cup ==
In the next editions, Japan seemed to be placed in a much easier group than three years ago, when Japan was drawn with host Vietnam, Qatar and the UAE. Qatar and the UAE had also won 2006 Asian Games and 18th Arabian Gulf Cup, effectively putting Japan on board with two other champions outside host Vietnam.

However, Japan opened their accounts unimpressive with just a 1–1 draw to Qatar, which made Ivica Osim to label his players as "amateur". Japan went on to beat the UAE 3–1 and Vietnam 4–1, the latter would join Japan into the quarter-finals. Japan later took vengeance on Australia by defeating the Socceroos 4–3 in the penalty shootout in Hanoi. However, within the same stuff, Japan lost to eventual runners-up Saudi Arabia 2–3 and had to play the third-place match, when they lost on penalty shootout this time, 5–6, to rival South Korea.

Team	Pld	W	D	L	GF	GA	GD	Pts
Japan	3	2	1	0	8	3	+5	7
Vietnam	3	1	1	1	4	5	−1	4
United Arab Emirates	3	1	0	2	3	6	−3	3
Qatar	3	0	2	1	3	4	−1	2

9 July 2007
17:15 UTC+7

Japan	1–1	Qatar
Takahara 61'	Report	Soria 88'

Mỹ Đình Stadium, Hanoi
Attendance: 5,000
Referee: Matthew Breeze (Australia)

13 July 2007
20:30 UTC+7

United Arab Emirates	1–3	Japan
Al-Kass 66'	Report	Takahara 22', 27'; S. Nakamura 42' (pen.)

Mỹ Đình Stadium, Hanoi
Attendance: 5,000
Referee: Satop Tongkhan (Thailand)

16 July 2007
17:15 UTC+7

Vietnam	1–4	Japan
Suzuki 8' (o.g.)	Report	Maki 12', 59'; Endō 31'; S. Nakamura 53'

Mỹ Đình Stadium, Hanoi
Attendance: 40,000
Referee: Matthew Breeze (Australia)

=== Knockout stage ===
Quarter-finals

21 July 2007
17:15 UTC+7

Japan	1–1 (a.e.t.)	Australia
Takahara 72'	Report	Aloisi 70'
Penalties
Nakamura (penalty scored); Endō (penalty scored); Komano (penalty scored); Takahara (penalty missed); Nakazawa (penalty scored)	4–3	(penalty missed) Kewell; (penalty missed) Neill; (penalty scored) Cahill; (penalty scored) Carle; (penalty scored) Carney

Mỹ Đình Stadium, Hanoi
Attendance: 25,000
Referee: Saad Kamil Al-Fadhli (Kuwait)

Semi-finals

25 July 2007
20:15 UTC+7

Japan	2–3	Saudi Arabia
Nakazawa 37'; Abe 53'	Report	Y. Al-Qahtani 35'; Mouath 47', 57'

Mỹ Đình Stadium, Hanoi
Attendance: 10,000
Referee: Matthew Breeze (Australia)

Third-place match

28 July 2007
19:30 UTC+7

South Korea	0–0 (a.e.t.)	Japan
	Report
Penalties
Cho Jae-Jin (penalty scored); Oh Beom-Seok (penalty scored); Lee Chun-Soo (penalty scored); Lee Ho (penalty scored); Kim Jin-Kyu (penalty scored); Kim Chi-Woo (penalty scored)	6–5	(penalty scored) S. Nakamura; (penalty scored) Endō; (penalty scored) Abe; (penalty scored) Komano; (penalty scored) Nakazawa; (penalty missed) Hanyu

Gelora Sriwijaya Stadium, Palembang
Attendance: 10,000
Referee: Ali Al-Badwawi (United Arab Emirates)

== 2011 AFC Asian Cup ==
After just won 4th place four years before, Japan had to take part on the qualification round, where they won first to qualify for the tournament. Once again, Japan was placed with Saudi Arabia, alongside Jordan and Syria, both had not participated four years ago.

However, Japan was stunned by Jordan after just a 1–1 draw, drew criticisms from the fans and coach Alberto Zaccheroni had to change tactics to suit the situation. The match with Syria had also drawn criticisms later due to poor performance of Japanese players, despite winning 2–1. Nonetheless, these criticisms vanished when Japan destroyed Saudi Arabia 5–0 to march into the quarter-finals facing host Qatar.

In the quarter-final match, Japan suffered even a red card and two goals-lead by Qatar, but in the end Japan fought back and won 3–2, eliminated host Qatar from the tournament. Japan would make up meeting with old rival South Korea, where they drew 2–2 after 120 minutes before winning 3–0 on penalty shootout and went into the final.

In the final, Japan met Asia's no.1 ranking team, Australia. Nonetheless, despite heavy pressures from the Socceroos, Japan withstood and at the extra time, Tadanari Lee scored the only goal in the match, helping Japan to claim the title for the fourth times, became the most successful team in the tournament's history.

Team	Pld	W	D	L	GF	GA	GD	Pts
Japan	3	2	1	0	8	2	+6	7
Jordan	3	2	1	0	4	2	+2	7
Syria	3	1	0	2	4	5	−1	3
Saudi Arabia	3	0	0	3	1	8	−7	0

9 January 2011
Japan	1–1	Jordan
13 January 2011
Syria	1–2	Japan
17 January 2011
Saudi Arabia	0–5	Japan

=== Knockout stage ===
Quarter-finals

21 January 2011
16:30

Japan	3–2	Qatar
Kagawa 29', 71'; Inoha 89'	Report	Soria 13'; Fábio César 63'

Al-Gharafa Stadium, Doha
Attendance: 19,479
Referee: Subkhiddin Mohd Salleh (Malaysia)

Semi-finals

25 January 2011
16:30

Japan	2–2 (a.e.t.)	South Korea
Maeda 36'; Hosogai 97'	Report	Ki Sung-Yueng 23' (pen.); Hwang Jae-Won 120'
Penalties
K. Honda (penalty scored); Okazaki (penalty scored); Nagatomo (penalty missed); Konno (penalty scored)	3–0	(penalty missed) Koo Ja-Cheol; (penalty missed) Lee Yong-Rae; (penalty missed) Hong Jeong-Ho

Al-Gharafa Stadium, Doha
Attendance: 16,171
Referee: Khalil Al Ghamdi (Saudi Arabia)

Final

29 January 2011
18:00

Australia	0–1 (a.e.t.)	Japan
	Report	Lee 109'

Khalifa International Stadium, Doha
Attendance: 37,174
Referee: Ravshan Irmatov (Uzbekistan)

Keisuke Honda was awarded as the most valuable player in the tournament.

== 2015 AFC Asian Cup ==
Having won four titles, Japan was considered as the contender for the next title in the 2015 Asian Cup, where they were drawn with debutant Palestine, 2011 rival Jordan and former champion Iraq. With experiences, Japan was not hard to dominate the group stage. Japan defeated Palestine 4–0, Iraq 1–0 and Jordan 2–0 to win the group with full nine points and no goal conceded. This led to popular belief that Japan would have won the tournament again. However, the quarter-final encounter over the UAE was a shocking humiliation, when they just earned a 1–1 draw to the Gulf side after 120 minutes before losing 4–5 on the penalty shootout. The UAE would go on to win bronze medal in the tournament. It was Japan's worst finish ever since 1996.

Pos	Team	Pld	W	D	L	GF	GA	GD	Pts	Qualification
1	Japan	3	3	0	0	7	0	+7	9	Advance to knockout stage
2	Iraq	3	2	0	1	3	1	+2	6	Advance to knockout stage
3	Jordan	3	1	0	2	5	4	+1	3	
4	Palestine	3	0	0	3	1	11	−10	0	

Source: Asian Cup Australia 2015
Rules for classification: Tiebreakers

12 January 2015
Japan	4–0	Palestine	Newcastle Stadium, Newcastle
16 January 2015
Iraq	0–1	Japan	Brisbane Stadium, Brisbane
20 January 2015
Japan	2–0	Jordan	AAMI Park, Melbourne

=== Knockout stage ===
Quarter-finals

23 January 2015
20:30 AEDT (UTC+11)

Japan	1–1 (a.e.t.)	United Arab Emirates
Shibasaki 81'	Report	Mabkhout 7'
Penalties
Honda (penalty missed); Hasebe (penalty scored); Shibasaki (penalty scored); Toyoda (penalty scored); Morishige (penalty scored); Kagawa (penalty missed)	4–5	(penalty scored) O. Abdulrahman; (penalty scored) Mabkhout; (penalty missed) Esmaeel; (penalty scored) Hassan; (penalty scored) Fardan; (penalty scored) I. Ahmed

Stadium Australia, Sydney
Attendance: 19,094
Referee: Alireza Faghani (Iran)

== 2019 AFC Asian Cup ==
Japan made their ninth appearance in the Asian Cup after they were drawn with Uzbekistan, Oman and Turkmenistan. As usual, Japan was regarded as one of the favourite teams to win the tournament.

Pos	Team	Pld	W	D	L	GF	GA	GD	Pts	Qualification
1	Japan	3	3	0	0	6	3	+3	9	Advance to knockout stage
2	Uzbekistan	3	2	0	1	7	3	+4	6	Advance to knockout stage
3	Oman	3	1	0	2	4	4	0	3	Advance to knockout stage
4	Turkmenistan	3	0	0	3	3	10	−7	0	

Source: AFC
9 January 2019
15:00

Japan	3–2	Turkmenistan
Osako 56', 60'; Dōan 71'	Report	Amanow 26'; Ataýew 79' (pen.)

Al Nahyan Stadium, Abu Dhabi
Attendance: 5,725
Referee: Alireza Faghani (Iran)

13 January 2019
17:30

Oman	0–1	Japan
	Report	Haraguchi 28' (pen.)

Zayed Sports City Stadium, Abu Dhabi
Attendance: 12,110
Referee: Mohd Amirul Izwan Yaacob (Malaysia)

17 January 2019
17:30

Japan	2–1	Uzbekistan
Muto 43'; Shiotani 58'	Report	Shomurodov 40'

Khalifa bin Zayed Stadium, Al Ain
Attendance: 7,005
Referee: Mohammed Abdulla Hassan Mohamed (United Arab Emirates)

=== Knockout stage ===
Round of 16

21 January 2019
15:00

Japan	1–0	Saudi Arabia
Tomiyasu 20'	Report

Sharjah Stadium, Sharjah
Attendance: 6,832
Referee: Ravshan Irmatov (Uzbekistan)

Quarter-finals

24 January 2019
17:00

Vietnam	0–1	Japan
	Report	Dōan 57' (pen.)

Al Maktoum Stadium, Dubai
Attendance: 8,954
Referee: Mohammed Abdulla Hassan Mohamed (United Arab Emirates)

Semi-finals

28 January 2019
18:00

Iran	0–3	Japan
	Report	Osako 56', 67' (pen.); Haraguchi 90+1'

Hazza bin Zayed Stadium, Al Ain
Attendance: 23,262
Referee: Chris Beath (Australia)

Final

1 February 2019
18:00

Japan	1–3	Qatar
Minamino 69'	Report	Ali 12'; Hatem 27'; Afif 83' (pen.)

Zayed Sports City Stadium, Abu Dhabi
Attendance: 36,776
Referee: Ravshan Irmatov (Uzbekistan)

== 2023 AFC Asian Cup ==
=== Group D ===
Pos	Team	Pld	W	D	L	GF	GA	GD	Pts	Qualification
1	Iraq	3	3	0	0	8	4	+4	9	Advance to knockout stage
2	Japan	3	2	0	1	8	5	+3	6	Advance to knockout stage
3	Indonesia	3	1	0	2	3	6	−3	3	Advance to knockout stage
4	Vietnam	3	0	0	3	4	8	−4	0	

Source: AFC
Rules for classification: Group stage tiebreakers
14 January 2024
14:30

Japan	4–2	Vietnam
Minamino 11', 45'; Nakamura 45+4'; Ueda 85'	Report	Nguyễn Đình Bắc 16'; Phạm Tuấn Hải 33'

Al Thumama Stadium, Doha
Attendance: 17,385
Referee: Kim Jong-hyeok (South Korea)

19 January 2024
14:30

Iraq	2–1	Japan
Hussein 5', 45+4'	Report	Endo 90+3'

Education City Stadium, Al Rayyan
Attendance: 38,663
Referee: Khalid Al-Turais (Saudi Arabia)

24 January 2024
14:30

Japan	3–1	Indonesia
Ueda 6' (pen.), 52'; Hubner 88' (o.g.)	Report	Walsh 90+1'

Al Thumama Stadium, Doha
Attendance: 26,453
Referee: Khamis Al-Marri (Qatar)

=== Knockout stage ===
==== Round of 16 ====
31 January 2024
14:30

Bahrain	1–3	Japan
Ueda 64' (o.g.)	Report	Dōan 31'; Kubo 49'; Ueda 72'

Al Thumama Stadium, Doha
Attendance: 31,832
Referee: Ahmad Al-Ali (Kuwait)

==== Quarter-finals ====
3 February 2024
14:30

Iran	2–1	Japan
Mohebi 55'; Jahanbakhsh 90+6' (pen.)	Report	Morita 28'

Education City Stadium, Al Rayyan
Attendance: 35,640
Referee: Ma Ning (China)

== See also ==
- Japan at the Copa América
- Japan at the FIFA World Cup

== Head-to-head record ==
Opponent	Pld	W	D	L	GF	GA	GD	Win %
Australia	2	1	1	0	2	1	+1	50.00
Bahrain	2	2	0	0	7	4	+3	100.00
China	4	4	0	0	10	5	+5	100.00
Indonesia	1	1	0	0	3	1	+2	100.00
Iran	5	2	2	1	5	2	+3	40.00
Iraq	3	2	0	1	6	3	+3	66.67
Jordan	3	1	2	0	4	2	+2	33.33
Kuwait	1	0	0	1	0	2	−2	0.00
North Korea	1	0	1	0	1	1	+0	0.00
Oman	2	2	0	0	2	0	+2	100.00
Palestine	1	1	0	0	4	0	+4	100.00
Qatar	5	1	2	2	6	10	−4	20.00
Saudi Arabia	6	5	0	1	14	4	+10	83.33
South Korea	3	0	2	1	2	4	−2	0.00
Syria	2	2	0	0	4	2	+2	100.00
Thailand	1	1	0	0	4	1	+3	100.00
Turkmenistan	1	1	0	0	3	2	+1	100.00
United Arab Emirates	4	1	2	1	4	3	+1	25.00
Uzbekistan	3	3	0	0	14	2	+12	100.00
Vietnam	3	3	0	0	9	3	+6	100.00
Total	53	33	12	8	104	52	+52	62.26
