= List of AFC Cup and AFC Champions League Two finals =

- Founded: 2004; 22 years ago
- Region: Asia (AFC)
- Teams: 36–48 (group stage); 2 (finalists)
- Current champions: (Japan) Gamba Osaka (1st title)
- Most championships: Al-Kuwait (Iraq) Al-Quwa Al-Jawiya (3 titles each)

The AFC Champions League Two, formerly the AFC Cup, is an association football competition established in 2004 by Asian Football Confederation. It is considered the second most important international competition for Asian clubs, after the AFC Champions League Elite. Clubs qualify for the AFC Champions League Two based on their performance in national leagues and cup competitions. For the first 5 years of the competition, the final was contested over two legs, one at each participating club's stadium, but since 2009, the final is held as a single match. Syrian side Al-Jaish won the inaugural competition in 2004, defeating Syrian side Al-Wahda on away goals.

Al-Kuwait and Al-Quwa Al-Jawiya are the most successful clubs in the competition's history, having won three titles each. Clubs from Kuwait won four titles, making them the most successful nation in the competition. The tournament is dominated by clubs from West Asia, with the only winners from outside that region being Uzbek side FC Nasaf in 2011, Malaysian side Johor Darul Ta'zim in 2015 and Australian side Central Coast Mariners in 2024. The current champions are Gamba Osaka, who beat Al-Nassr 1–0 in the 2026 final.

== List of finals ==
List of AFC Cup and AFC Champions League Two finals
Season	Winners	Score	Runners-up	Venue	Attendance
AFC Cup era (2004–2024)
Two-legged format
2004	(Syria) Al-Jaish	3–2	(Syria) Al-Wahda	Abbasiyyin Stadium, Damascus, Syria	
2004	(Syria) Al-Jaish	0–1	(Syria) Al-Wahda	Abbasiyyin Stadium, Damascus, Syria	
2004	Aggregate 3–3, Al-Jaish won on away goals.				
2005	(Jordan) Al-Faisaly	1–0	(Lebanon) Nejmeh	Amman International Stadium, Amman, Jordan	
2005	(Jordan) Al-Faisaly	3–2	(Lebanon) Nejmeh	Rafic Hariri Stadium, Beirut, Lebanon	
2005	Al-Faisaly won 4–2 on aggregate.				
2006	(Jordan) Al-Faisaly	3–0	(Bahrain) Al-Muharraq	Amman International Stadium, Amman, Jordan	7,000
2006	(Jordan) Al-Faisaly	2–4	(Bahrain) Al-Muharraq	Bahrain National Stadium, Riffa, Bahrain	3,000
2006	Al-Faisaly won 5–4 on aggregate.				
2007	(Jordan) Shabab Al-Ordon	1–0	(Jordan) Al-Faisaly	Amman International Stadium, Amman, Jordan	5,500
2007	(Jordan) Shabab Al-Ordon	1–1	(Jordan) Al-Faisaly	Amman International Stadium, Amman, Jordan	7,500
2007	Shabab Al-Ordon won 2–1 on aggregate.				
2008	(Bahrain) Al-Muharraq	5–1	(Lebanon) Safa	Bahrain National Stadium, Riffa, Bahrain	6,000
2008	(Bahrain) Al-Muharraq	5–4	(Lebanon) Safa	Sports City Stadium, Beirut, Lebanon	2,000
2008	Al-Muharraq won 10–5 on aggregate.				
Single match format
2009	Al-Kuwait	2–1	(Syria) Al-Karamah	Al Kuwait Sports Club Stadium, Kuwait City, Kuwait	17,400
2010	(Syria) Al-Ittihad	1–1 (a.e.t.) (4–2 p)	(Kuwait) Al-Qadsia	Jaber International Stadium, Kuwait City, Kuwait	58,604
2011	(Uzbekistan) Nasaf	2–1	Al-Kuwait	Markaziy Stadium, Qarshi, Uzbekistan	15,753
2012	Al-Kuwait	4–0	(Iraq) Erbil	Franso Hariri Stadium, Erbil, Iraq	30,000
2013	Al-Kuwait	2–0	(Kuwait) Al-Qadsia	Al-Sadaqua Walsalam Stadium, Kuwait City, Kuwait	10,000
2014	(Kuwait) Al-Qadsia	0–0 (a.e.t.) (4–2 p)	(Iraq) Erbil	Maktoum Bin Rashid Al Maktoum Stadium, Dubai, UAE	5,240
2015	(Malaysia) Johor Darul Ta'zim	1–0	(Tajikistan) Istiklol	Pamir Stadium, Dushanbe, Tajikistan	18,000
2016	(Iraq) Al-Quwa Al-Jawiya	1–0	(India) Bengaluru	Suheim Bin Hamad Stadium, Doha, Qatar	5,806
2017	(Iraq) Al-Quwa Al-Jawiya	1–0	(Tajikistan) Istiklol	Hisor Central Stadium, Hisor, Tajikistan	20,000
2018	(Iraq) Al-Quwa Al-Jawiya	2–0	(Turkmenistan) Altyn Asyr	Basra International Stadium, Basra, Iraq	24,665
2019	(Lebanon) Al-Ahed	1–0	(North Korea) April 25	Kuala Lumpur Stadium, Kuala Lumpur, Malaysia	500
2020	Cancelled due to the COVID-19 pandemic in Asia.				
2021	(Bahrain) Al-Muharraq	3–0	(Uzbekistan) Nasaf	Al-Muharraq Stadium, Arad, Bahrain	9,060
2022	(Oman) Al-Seeb	3–0	(Malaysia) Kuala Lumpur City	Bukit Jalil National Stadium, Kuala Lumpur, Malaysia	27,722
2023–24	(Australia) Central Coast Mariners	1–0	(Lebanon) Al-Ahed	Sultan Qaboos Sports Complex, Muscat, Oman	1,930
AFC Champions League Two era (2024–present)
2024–25	(United Arab Emirates) Sharjah	2–1	(Singapore) Lion City Sailors	Bishan Stadium, Singapore	9,737
2025–26	(Japan) Gamba Osaka	1–0	(Saudi Arabia) Al-Nassr	King Saud University Stadium, Riyadh	25,207

== Performances ==
=== By club ===
Performances in the AFC Cup and AFC Champions League Two by club
Club	Winners	Runners-up	Years won	Years runners-up
Al-Kuwait	3	1	2009, 2012, 2013	2011
(Iraq) Al-Quwa Al-Jawiya	3	0	2016, 2017, 2018	
(Jordan) Al-Faisaly	2	1	2005, 2006	2007
(Bahrain) Al-Muharraq	2	1	2008, 2021	2006
(Kuwait) Al-Qadsia	1	2	2014	2010, 2013
(Uzbekistan) Nasaf Qarshi	1	1	2011	2021
(Lebanon) Al-Ahed	1	1	2019	2023–24
(Syria) Al-Jaish	1	0	2004	
(Jordan) Shabab Al-Ordon	1	0	2007	
(Syria) Al-Ittihad	1	0	2010	
(Malaysia) Johor Darul Ta'zim	1	0	2015	
(Oman) Al-Seeb	1	0	2022	
(Australia) Central Coast Mariners	1	0	2023–24	
(United Arab Emirates) Sharjah	1	0	2024–25	
(Japan) Gamba Osaka	1	0	2025–26	
(Iraq) Erbil	0	2		2012, 2014
(Tajikistan) Istiklol	0	2		2015, 2017
(Syria) Al-Wahda	0	1		2004
(Lebanon) Nejmeh	0	1		2005
(Lebanon) Safa	0	1		2008
(Syria) Al-Karamah	0	1		2009
(India) Bengaluru	0	1		2016
(Turkmenistan) Altyn Asyr	0	1		2018
(North Korea) April 25	0	1		2019
(Malaysia) Kuala Lumpur City	0	1		2022
(Singapore) Lion City Sailors	0	1		2024–25
(Saudi Arabia) Al-Nassr	0	1		2025–26

=== By nation ===
Nation	Titles	Runners-up	Total
Kuwait	4	3	7
Iraq	3	2	5
Jordan	3	1	4
Syria	2	2	4
Bahrain	2	1	3
Lebanon	1	2	3
Uzbekistan	1	1	2
Malaysia	1	1	2
Australia	1	0	1
Japan	1	0	1
Oman	1	0	1
United Arab Emirates	1	0	1
Tajikistan	0	2	2
India	0	1	1
Turkmenistan	0	1	1
North Korea	0	1	1
Saudi Arabia	0	1	1
Singapore	0	1	1

== See also ==
- List of Asian Club Championship and AFC Champions League finals
- List of Asian Cup Winners' Cup finals
