= List of Asian Cup Winners' Cup finals =

- Founded: 1990
- Abolished: 2002
- Region: Asia (AFC)
- Teams: 2 (finalists)
- Last champions: (Saudi Arabia) Al-Hilal (2nd title)
- Most championships: (Saudi Arabia) Al-Hilal (Japan) Yokohama F. Marinos (2 titles each)
- Website: the-afc.com

The Asian Cup Winners' Cup was a seasonal association football competition contested between member associations of Asian football's governing body, the Asian Football Confederation (AFC). It was open to winners of domestic cup competitions. In the first four editions of the Cup, the final match was played in two legs. After that, the final was always held as a single game and hosted by one of the two finalist teams or in a neutral country. The first competition was won by Persepolis, from Iran, who defeated Bahrain's Al-Muharraq 1–0 over two legs to win the 1991 final. The competition was abolished in 2002; Saudi Arabian team Al-Hilal were the last team to win the competition when they beat Jeonbuk Hyundai Motors 2–1.

Al-Hilal and Yokohama F. Marinos are the most successful clubs in the competition's history, having won it on two occasions each. Teams from Saudi Arabia won the competition six times, more than any other country.

== List of finals ==
Key
†	Match was won after extra time

- The "Season" column refers to the season the competition was held, and wikilinks to the article about that season.
- The two-legged finals are listed in the order they were played.

Asian Cup Winners' Cup finals
Season	Nation	Winners	Score	Runners-up	Nation	Venue
Two-legged format
1990–91	Iran	Persepolis	0–0	Al-Muharraq	Bahrain	Bahrain National Stadium, Riffa, Bahrain
1990–91	Iran	Persepolis	1–0	Al-Muharraq	Bahrain	Azadi Stadium, Tehran, Iran
1990–91	Persepolis won 1–0 on aggregate.					
1991–92	Japan	Nissan FC	1–1	Al-Nassr	Saudi Arabia	Prince Faisal bin Fahd Stadium, Riyadh, Saudi Arabia
1991–92	Japan	Nissan FC	5–0	Al-Nassr	Saudi Arabia	Hiratsuka Stadium, Hiratsuka, Japan
1991–92	Nissan FC won 6–1 on aggregate.					
1992–93	Japan	Yokohama Marinos	1–1	Persepolis	Iran	National Stadium, Tokyo, Japan
1992–93	Japan	Yokohama Marinos	1–0	Persepolis	Iran	Azadi Stadium, Tehran, Iran
1992–93	Yokohama Marinos won 2–1 on aggregate.					
1993–94	Saudi Arabia	Al-Qadsiah	4–2	South China	Hong Kong	Hong Kong Stadium, Hong Kong
1993–94	Saudi Arabia	Al-Qadsiah	2–0	South China	Hong Kong	Prince Saud bin Jalawi Stadium, Khobar, Saudi Arabia
1993–94	Al-Qadsiah won 6–2 on aggregate.					
Single match format
1994–95	Japan	Yokohama Flügels	2–1^{†}	Al-Shaab	UAE	Khalid bin Mohammed Stadium, Sharjah, UAE
1995–96	Japan	Bellmare Hiratsuka	2–1	Al-Talaba	Iraq	Mitsuzawa Stadium, Yokohama, Japan
1996–97	Saudi Arabia	Al-Hilal	3–1	Nagoya Grampus Eight	Japan	King Fahd International Stadium, Riyadh, Saudi Arabia
1997–98	Saudi Arabia	Al-Nassr	1–0	Suwon Samsung Bluewings	South Korea	King Fahd International Stadium, Riyadh, Saudi Arabia
1998–99	Saudi Arabia	Al-Ittihad	3–2^{†}	Jeonnam Dragons	South Korea	National Stadium, Tokyo, Japan
1999–2000	Japan	Shimizu S-Pulse	1–0	Al-Zawraa	Iraq	700th Anniversary Stadium, Chiang Mai, Thailand
2000–01	Saudi Arabia	Al-Shabab	4–2	Dalian Shide	China	Prince Abdullah Al-Faisal Stadium, Jeddah, Saudi Arabia
2001–02	Saudi Arabia	Al-Hilal	2–1^{†}	Jeonbuk Hyundai Motors	South Korea	Al-Sadd Stadium, Doha, Qatar

== Performances ==
=== By club ===
Performances in the Asian Cup Winners' Cup by club
Club	Title(s)	Runners-up	Seasons won	Seasons runner-up
(Saudi Arabia) Al-Hilal	2	0	1996–97, 2001–02	—
(Japan) Yokohama F. Marinos^{1}	2	0	1991–92, 1992–93	—
(Iran) Persepolis	1	1	1990–91	1992–93
(Saudi Arabia) Al-Nassr	1	1	1997–98	1991–92
(Saudi Arabia) Al-Qadisiyah	1	0	1993–94	—
(Japan) Yokohama Flügels^{2}	1	0	1994–95	—
(Japan) Shonan Bellmare	1	0	1995	—
(Saudi Arabia) Al-Ittihad	1	0	1998–99	—
(Japan) Shimizu S-Pulse	1	0	1999–2000	—
(Saudi Arabia) Al-Shabab	1	0	2000–01	—
(Bahrain) Al-Muharraq	0	1	—	1990–91
(Hong Kong) South China	0	1	—	1993–94
(United Arab Emirates) Al-Shaab	0	1	—	1994–95
(Iraq) Al-Talaba	0	1	—	1995
(Japan) Nagoya Grampus	0	1	—	1996–97
(South Korea) Suwon Samsung Bluewings	0	1	—	1997–98
(South Korea) Jeonnam Dragons	0	1	—	1998–99
(Iraq) Al-Zawraa	0	1	—	1999–2000
(China) Dalian Shide	0	1	—	2000–01
(South Korea) Jeonbuk Hyundai Motors	0	1	—	2001–02

^{1} including Nissan FC.
^{2} Yokohama Flügels was merged with Yokohama Marinos to Yokohama F. Marinos in 1999.

=== By nation ===
Performances in finals by nation
Nation	Titles	Runners-up	Total
Saudi Arabia	6	1	7
Japan	5	1	6
Iran	1	1	2
South Korea	0	3	3
Iraq	0	2	2
Bahrain	0	1	1
China	0	1	1
Hong Kong	0	1	1
United Arab Emirates	0	1	1

== See also ==
- List of Asian Club Championship and AFC Champions League finals
