= Tetsuhiro =

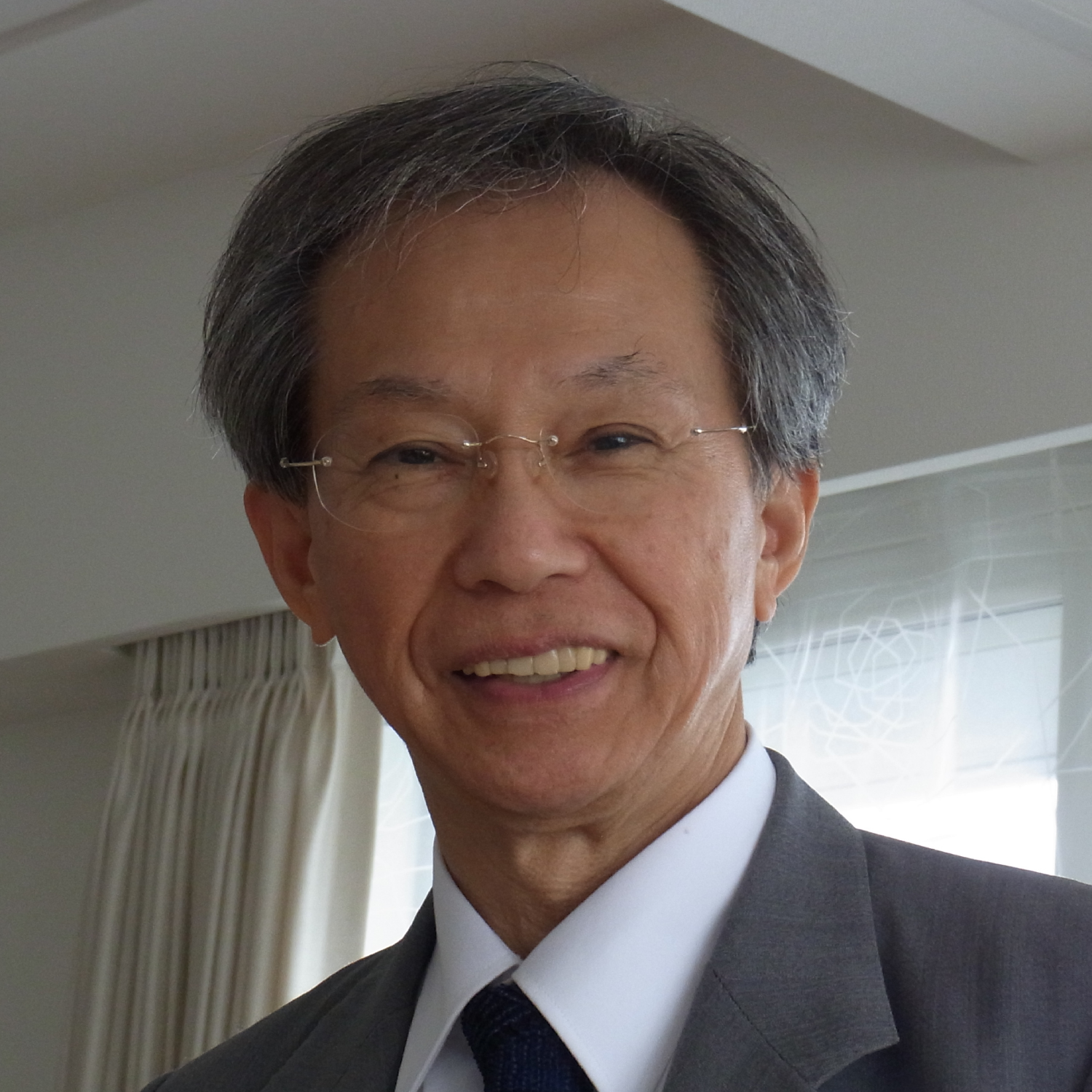
- Tetsuhiro Ito (1940–2021), Japanese neuropsychiatrist
- Pronunciation: tetsɯçiɾo (IPA)
- Gender: Male

Origin
- Origin: Japanese
- Meaning: Different meanings depending on the kanji used

Other names
- Alternative spelling: Tetuhiro (Kunrei-shiki) Tetuhiro (Nihon-shiki) Tetsuhiro (Hepburn)

Tetsuhiro is a masculine Japanese given name.

== Written forms ==
Tetsuhiro can be written using different combinations of kanji characters. Some examples:

- 鉄弘, "iron, vast"
- 鉄広, "iron, wide"
- 鉄廣, "iron, wide"
- 鉄寛, "iron, generosity"
- 鉄博, "iron, doctor"
- 鉄大, "iron, big"
- 鉄裕, "iron, abundant"
- 鉄洋, "iron, ocean"
- 鉄宏, "iron, wide"
- 鉄尋, "iron, look for"
- 哲弘, "philosophy, vast"
- 哲広, "philosophy, wide"
- 哲廣, "philosophy, wide"
- 哲寛, "philosophy, generosity"
- 哲大, "philosophy, big"
- 哲裕, "philosophy, abundant"
- 哲洋, "philosophy, ocean"
- 哲紘, "philosophy, vast"
- 哲宏, "philosophy, wide"
- 哲尋, "philosophy, look for"
- 徹弘, "penetrate, vast"

The name can also be written in hiragana てつひろ or katakana テツヒロ.

== Notable people with the name ==
- Tetsuhiro Ito (伊藤 哲寛; 1940–2021), Japanese neuropsychiatrist
- Tetsuhiro Kina (喜名 哲裕; born 1976), Japanese footballer
- Tetsuhiro Kuroda (黒田 哲広; born 1971), Japanese professional wrestler
