= Japan at the Copa América =

Country at the Copa America

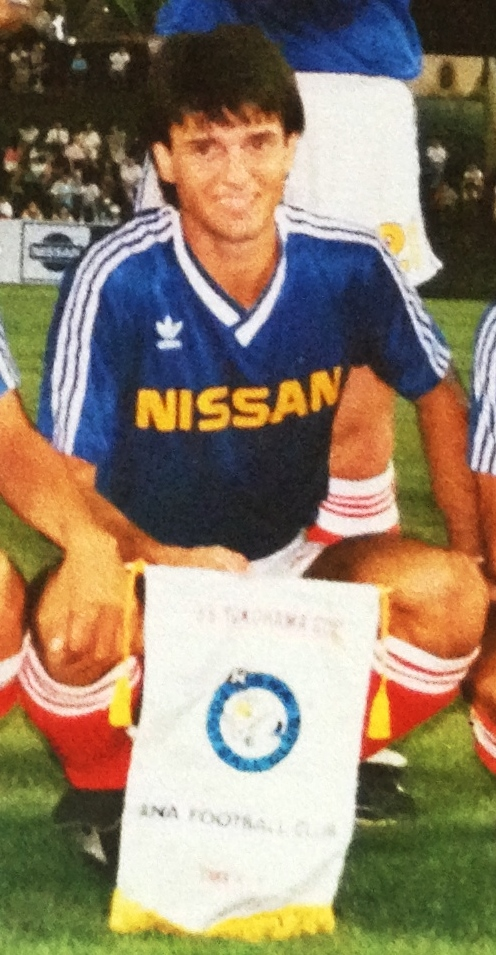
Brazilian-born striker Wagner Lopes played in Japan for ten year before gaining Japanese citizenship in 1997. At the Copa América two years later, he scored two goals in three matches.

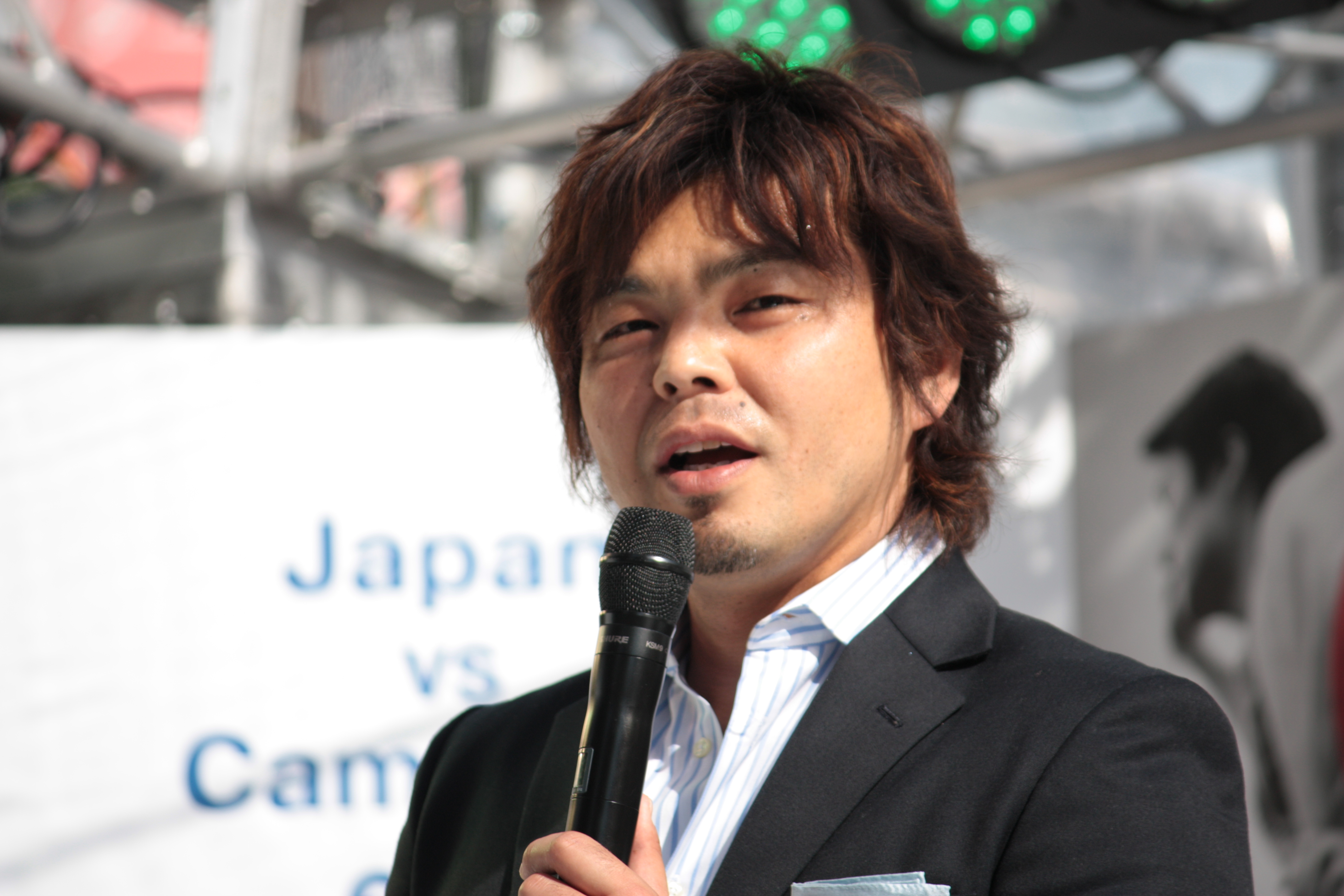
Shoji Jo (here in 2010) was Lopes' partner in the Japanese offense.

The Copa América is South America's major tournament in senior men's football and determines the continental champion. Until 1967, the tournament was known as South American Championship. It is the oldest continental championship in the world.

Japan are not members of the South American football confederation CONMEBOL. But because CONMEBOL only has ten member associations, guest nations have regularly been invited since 1993.

Japan has competed as invitee in 1999 and 2019, but were eliminated in the group stage on both occasions. In 1999, two out of three Japanese goals were scored by Wagner Lopes, who was born in South America and only naturalized two years prior.

In 2019, head coach Hajime Moriyasu called up a squad consisting mostly of uncapped players under 23 years of age in preparation for the 2020 Summer Olympics hosted in Japan. This decision was considered as a lack of respect, a concern voiced by Venezuelan coach Rafael Dudamel among others.

In their home confederation, the AFC, Japan is the most successful team with four continental titles. The second of those titles was won in 2000, only one year after the disappointing results at the 1999 Copa América.

== Record at the Copa América ==
Copa América record
Year	Round	Position	Pld	W	D*	L	GF	GA
1916 - 1997	Not invited							
(Paraguay) 1999	Group stage	10th	3	0	1	2	3	8
2004 - 2016	Not invited							
(Brazil) 2019	Group stage	9th	3	0	2	1	3	7
2021 - 2024	Not invited							
Total	2 participations	17/20	6	0	3	3	6	15

== Squads ==
Just like at the 1998 FIFA World Cup one year prior, the national squad only consisted of players from the J1 League. The 2019 squad consisted mostly of U23-players who would be eligible to play at the 2020 Summer Olympics.

== Match results ==
Tournament	Round	Opponent	Score
(Paraguay) 1999	Group stage	Peru	2–3
(Paraguay) 1999	Group stage	Paraguay	0–4
(Paraguay) 1999	Group stage	Bolivia	1–1
(Brazil) 2019	Group stage	Chile	0–4
(Brazil) 2019	Group stage	Uruguay	2–2
(Brazil) 2019	Group stage	Ecuador	1–1

== Goalscorers ==
Rank	Player	Goals	Tournaments
1	Wagner Lopes	2	1999
1	Kōji Miyoshi	2	2019
3	Atsuhiro Miura	1	1999
3	Shōya Nakajima	1	2019

== See also ==
- Japan at the FIFA World Cup
- Japan at the AFC Asian Cup
