= Tetsuo Nakanishi =

Japanese footballer and commentator

Tetsuo Nakanishi 中西 哲生
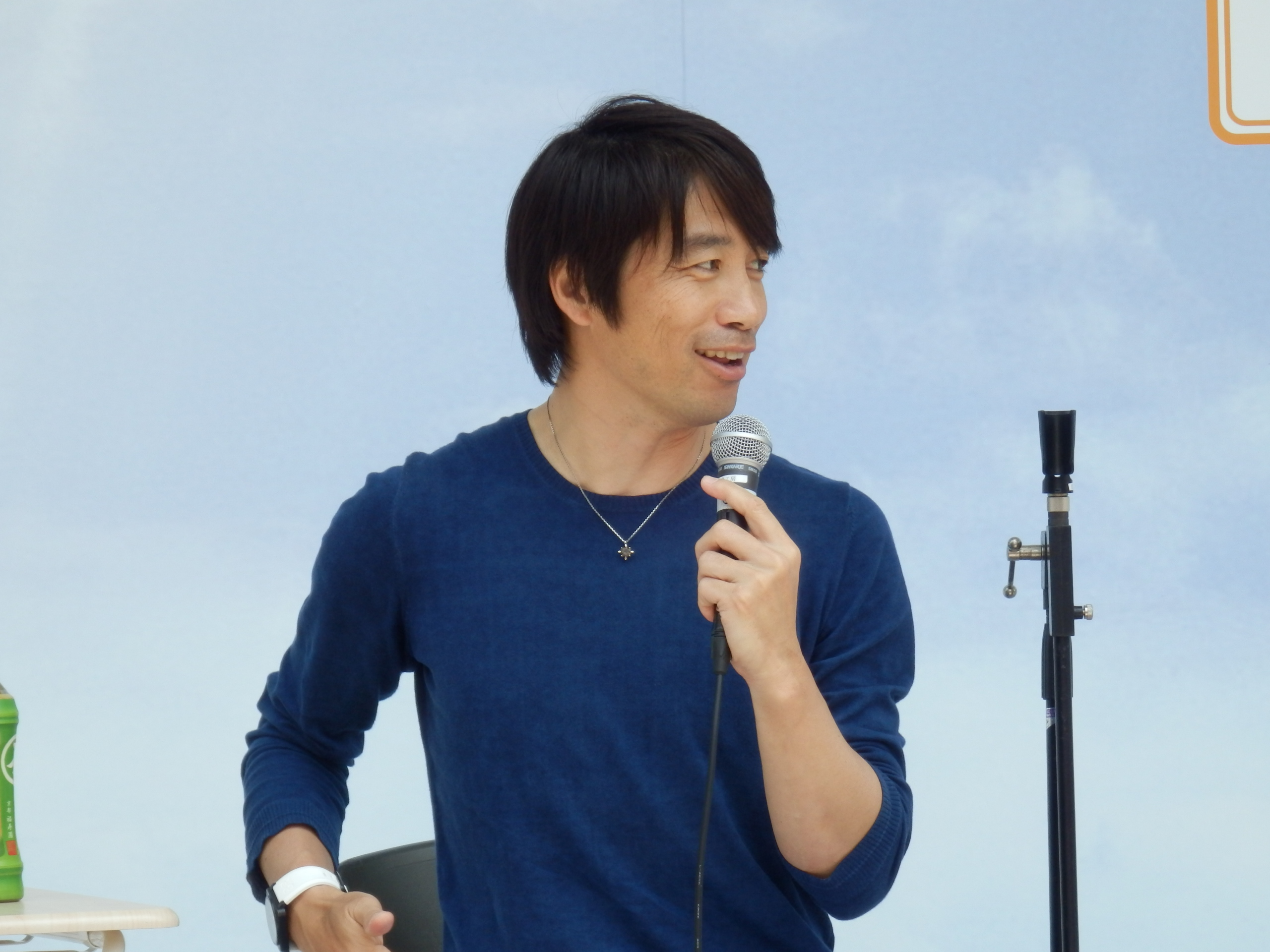

Personal information
- Full name: Tetsuo Nakanishi
- Date of birth: 8 September 1969 (age 57)
- Place of birth: Nagoya, Aichi, Japan
- Height: 1.77 m (5 ft 9 1/2 in)
- Positions: Defender; midfielder

Youth career
- 1985–1987: Aichi FC

College career
Years	Team	Apps	(Gls)
1988–1991	Doshisha University		

Senior career*
Years	Team	Apps	(Gls)
1992–1996	Nagoya Grampus Eight	90	(7)
1997–2000	Kawasaki Frontale	96	(5)
Total		186	(12)
Medal record
Nagoya Grampus Eight
Runner-up	J1 League	1996
Winner	Emperor's Cup	1995
Kawasaki Frontale
Runner-up	J.League Cup	2000
- * Club domestic league appearances and goals

Tetsuo Nakanishi (中西 哲生, Nakanishi Tetsuo; born 8 September 1969) is a former Japanese football player. He currently works on television as a football commentator.

== Playing career ==
Nakanishi was born in Nagoya on 8 September 1969. After graduating from Doshisha University, he joined his local club Nagoya Grampus Eight in 1992. He played many matches as midfielder from first season. Although he could hardly play in the match in 1993, he played many matches from 1994. The club also won the champions 1995 Emperor's Cup first major title in club history. In Asia, the club won the 2nd place 1996–97 Asian Cup Winners' Cup. At the final on 26 November 1996, he scored a goal. In 1997, he moved to Japan Football League club Kawasaki Frontale. He played in all matches as defender and defensive midfielder in 1997 and 1998. In 1998, the club won the 2nd place and was promoted to J2 League. In 1999, the club won the champions and was promoted to J1 League. However he lost regular position in 2000 and retired end of 2000 season.

== Private life ==
In March 2007, Nakanishi is married to model and actress Fumina Hara. In January 2014, he announced divorce with Hara.

== Club statistics ==
Club performance			League		Cup		League Cup		Total	
Season	Club	League	Apps	Goals	Apps	Goals	Apps	Goals	Apps	Goals
Japan			League		Emperor's Cup		J.League Cup		Total	
1992	Nagoya Grampus Eight	J1 League	-				10	0	10	0
1993	Nagoya Grampus Eight	J1 League	4	0	2	0	0	0	6	0
1994	Nagoya Grampus Eight	J1 League	37	1	0	0	0	0	37	1
1995	Nagoya Grampus Eight	J1 League	33	6	5	0	-		38	6
1996	Nagoya Grampus Eight	J1 League	16	0	1	0	9	0	26	0
1997	Kawasaki Frontale	Football League	30	5	3	0	-		33	5
1998	Kawasaki Frontale	Football League	30	0	3	0	3	0	36	0
1999	Kawasaki Frontale	J2 League	31	0	4	0	2	0	37	0
2000	Kawasaki Frontale	J1 League	5	0	0	0	0	0	5	0
Total			186	12	18	0	24	0	238	12
