= 1996–97 Asian Cup Winners' Cup =

Tournament details
- Teams: 26

Final positions
- Champions: (Saudi Arabia) Al Hilal (1st title)
- Runners-up: (Japan) Nagoya Grampus Eight
- Third place: (South Korea) Ulsan Hyundai Horang-i
- Fourth place: (Iran) Esteghlal

The 1996–97 Asian Cup Winners' Cup was the seventh edition of association football competition run by the Asian Football Confederation specifically for its members cup holders.

== First round ==
=== West Asia ===
Team 1	Agg.	Team 2	1st leg	2nd leg
Navbahor Namangan (Uzbekistan)	6–6 (a)	(Iraq) Jawiya	4–1	2–5
Pakhtakor Dzhabarrasulovsk (Tajikistan)	1–5	(Kyrgyzstan) Semetei Kyzyl-Kiya	0–2	1–3
Turan Daşoguz (Turkmenistan)	1–5	(Kazakhstan) Ordabasy-SKIF Chimkent	0–0	1–5
Al Hilal (Saudi Arabia)	(w/o)^{1}	(Bahrain) Al Qadisiyah		
Al Arabi (Kuwait)	1–1 (3–0p)	(Lebanon) Al Ansar	0–1	1–0
Baniyas Club (United Arab Emirates)	3–4	(Qatar) Al Ittihad	3–3	0–1
Esteghlal (Iran)	bye			
Al-Nasr (Oman)	bye			

^{1} Al Qadisiyah withdrew

=== East Asia ===
Team 1	Agg.	Team 2	1st leg	2nd leg
Valencia (Maldives)	(w/o)^{1}	(Sri Lanka) Old Benedictines	1–0	
Mohammedan (Bangladesh)	12–1^{2}	(Laos) Electricity of Lao	8–0	4–1
Pahang (Malaysia)	1–5	(Indonesia) Mastrans Bandung Raya	0–1	1–4
Hai Phong (Vietnam)	(w/o)^{3}	(Macau) Lam Pak		
Bellmare Hiratsuka (Japan)	bye			
Nagoya Grampus Eight (Japan)	bye			
South China (Hong Kong)	bye			
Ulsan Hyundai Horang-i (South Korea)	bye			

^{1} Old Benedictines withdrew after 1st leg
^{2} 2nd leg also reported 0–1
^{3} Lam Pak withdrew before 1st leg

== Second round ==
=== West Asia ===
Team 1	Agg.	Team 2	1st leg	2nd leg
Esteghlal (Iran)	4–4 (a)	(Uzbekistan) Navbahor Namangan	1-4	3–0
Semetei Kyzyl-Kiya (Kyrgyzstan)	3–7	(Kazakhstan) Ordabasy-SKIF Chimkent	1–0	2–7
Al Hilal (Saudi Arabia)	6–1	(Kuwait) Al Arabi	6–0	0–1
Al Ittihad (Qatar)	4–4 (a)	(Oman) Al-Nasr	3–2	1–2

=== East Asia ===
Team 1	Agg.	Team 2	1st leg	2nd leg
Bellmare Hiratsuka (Japan)	(w/o)^{1}	(Maldives) Valencia	7–0	
Ulsan Hyundai Horang-i (South Korea)	8–1^{2}	(Bangladesh) Mohammedan	5–0	3–1
Mastrans Bandung Raya (Indonesia)	1–5	(Hong Kong) South China	1–1	0–4
Hai Phong (Vietnam)	1–4	(Japan) Nagoya Grampus Eight	1–1	0–3

^{1} Valencia withdrew after 1st leg
^{2} 1st leg also reported as 5–1

== Quarterfinals ==
=== West Asia ===
Team 1	Agg.	Team 2	1st leg	2nd leg
Esteghlal (Iran)	2–1	(Kazakhstan) FC SKIF Ordabasy	1–0	1–1
Al-Nasr (Oman)	(w/o)^{1}	(Saudi Arabia) Al Hilal	0–5	

^{1} Al Nasr withdrew after 1st leg

=== East Asia ===
Team 1	Agg.	Team 2	1st leg	2nd leg
Bellmare Hiratsuka (Japan)	1–2	(South Korea) Ulsan Hyundai Horang-i	1–0	0–2
Nagoya Grampus Eight (Japan)	4–2	(Hong Kong) South China	2–0	2–2

== Semifinals ==
24 November 1996

Al Hilal (Saudi Arabia)	0–0 (a.e.t.)	(Iran) Esteghlal
Penalties
	5–4

King Fahd International Stadium, Riyadh
Referee: Saeed Abdullah (United Arab Emirates)
24 November 1996

Ulsan Hyundai Horang-i (South Korea)	0–5	(Japan) Nagoya Grampus Eight
		Donald-Olivier Sié 11'; Tetsuo Nakanishi 36'; Dragan Stojković 58'; Shigeyoshi Mochizuki 71'; Kenji Fukuda 89'

Riyadh, Saudi Arabia

== Third place match ==
26 November 1996

Ulsan Hyundai Horang-i (South Korea)	1–0	(Iran) Esteghlal
Kim Ki-Nam 7'

Riyadh, Saudi Arabia

== Final ==
26 November 1996

Al Hilal (Saudi Arabia)	3–1	(Japan) Nagoya Grampus Eight
Al Jaber 17'; Al Thunayan 76'; Bassir 82'	Report	Tetsuo Nakanishi 57'

King Fahd International Stadium, Riyadh
Attendance: 26,104
Referee: Ali Mandani (Kuwait)
