= Takayuki Nishigaya =

Japanese footballer and manager

Takayuki Nishigaya 西ヶ谷 隆之
Personal information
- Full name: Takayuki Nishigaya
- Date of birth: 12 May 1973 (age 53)
- Place of birth: Shizuoka, Japan
- Height: 1.80 m (5 ft 11 in)
- Positions: Midfielder; defender

Youth career
- 1989–1991: Shimizu Commercial High School

College career
Years	Team	Apps	(Gls)
1992–1995	University of Tsukuba		

Senior career*
Years	Team	Apps	(Gls)
1996–1997	Nagoya Grampus Eight	35	(0)
1998	Avispa Fukuoka	25	(0)
1999	Verdy Kawasaki	3	(0)
2000	JEF United Ichihara	0	(0)
2001	Albirex Niigata	37	(0)
Total		100	(0)

Managerial career
- 2003–2004: Tsukuba University (assistant)
- 2004–2010: Tokyo Verdy (assistant)
- 2010–2012: Chukyo University (assistant)
- 2012: Albirex Niigata (assistant)
- 2015–2017: Mito HollyHock
- 2018: SC Sagamihara
- 2019–2020: Matsumoto Yamaga U18
- 2020–2021: Matsumoto Yamaga (assistant)
- 2022–2024: Singapore
- 2024–2025: Thailand U23
Medal record
Nagoya Grampus Eight
Runner-up	J1 League	1996
- * Club domestic league appearances and goals

Takayuki Nishigaya (西ヶ谷 隆之, Nishigaya Takayuki; born 12 May 1973) is a Japanese professional manager and former footballer.

== Playing career ==
Nishigaya was born in Shizuoka on 12 May 1973. After graduating from the University of Tsukuba, he joined J1 League club Nagoya Grampus Eight with teammate Shigeyoshi Mochizuki in 1996. He mostly played as a centre-back during that first season. In 1998, he moved to Avispa Fukuoka. He became a regular player as the left-back of a three back defence. In 1999, he moved to Verdy Kawasaki, where he did not play much. In 2000, he moved to JEF United Ichihara. Here, too, he did not play much. In 2001, he moved to J2 League club Albirex Niigata. There, he played a variety of positions, such as defensive midfielder, centre-back and left-back. He retired at the end of the 2001 season.

== Coaching career ==
After retiring, Nishigaya started his coaching career at his alma mater, the University of Tsukuba, in 2003. In 2004, he signed with Tokyo Verdy. He coached for their youth team until 2009. In 2010, he became a manager for Meiji University.

Nishigaya went on to become assistant coach at Albirex Niigata under Hisashi Kurosaki at 2012, and Mito Hollyhock between 2013 and 2015 under Tetsuji Hashiratani, before being promoted to head coach at the latter, after Hashiratani was sacked. In February 2018, Nishigaya became the head coach of SC Sagamihara before moving on to Matsumoto Yamaga, where he was under-18 head coach, and then becoming first-team assistant under Kei Shibata in 2020.

=== Singapore ===
In April 2022, Nishigaya was appointed as the manager of the Singapore national team in a two-year contract. He failed to bring Singapore to qualify for the 2023 AFC Asian Cup after losing to Kyrgyzstan 1–2 and losing to Tajikistan 1–0 despite winning against Myanmar 6–2 in third round of 2023 AFC Asian Cup qualification. Nishigaya also led the team to a disappointing AFF Cup run, despite a narrow win against Laos and Myanmar, a scoreless draw with Vietnam, the Lions failed to qualify to the semi-finals after a heavy 4–1 humiliation against Malaysia. Despite calls for him to be replaced, he has continued as head coach.

In June 2023, Nishigaya only managed to get two draw results in the friendly matches against Oceania countries, Papua New Guinea and Solomon Island. Chants of "Sack the coach" was being chanted so loudly at the National Stadium to the point Nishigaya had to called for security to protect him.

Nishigaya narrowly led Singapore to a 3–1 win on aggregate against Guam in the 2026 FIFA World Cup qualification first round. Nishigaya led Singapore with a disastrous results in the first two matches of the second round of the World Cup qualifiers. As Singapore lost 5–0 to South Korea away and lost 3–1 to Thailand in home ground. On 29 January 2024, Nishigaya was sacked from his duty as Singapore head coach with only 8 wins from 21 matches, thus making him as one of the worst foreign head coach to managed Singapore.

=== Thailand U23 ===
On 4 September 2024, Nishigaya was appointed as the head coach for the Thailand U-23 team. Nishigaya had an awful start as he lost all his first 5 matches in charge including a lost against Hong Kong U-23 2–3 which they were down by 0–3 at half-time. On 27 June 2025, he was eventually sacked as Thailand U-23 head coach due to his dismal record of losing every single game.

== Career statistics ==
Appearances and goals by club, season and competition
Club	Season	League			Emperor's Cup		J.League Cup		Total	
Club	Season	Division	Apps	Goals	Apps	Goals	Apps	Goals	Apps	Goals
Nagoya Grampus Eight	1996	J1 League	13	0	1	0	7	0	21	0
Nagoya Grampus Eight	1997	J1 League	22	0	1	0	7	0	30	0
Avispa Fukuoka	1998	J1 League	25	0	3	1	3	1	31	2
Verdy Kawasaki	1999	J1 League	3	0	0	0	0	0	3	0
JEF United Ichihara	2000	J1 League	0	0	0	0	2	0	2	0
Albirex Niigata	2001	J2 League	37	0	0	0	2	0	39	0
Career total			100	0	21	1	5	1	126	2

== Managerial statistics ==
As of 27 June 2025

Managerial record by team and tenure
Team	Nat	From	To	Record				
Team	Nat	From	To	G	W	D	L	Win %
Mito HollyHock	(Japan)	27 June 2015	31 January 2018	114	33	42	39	28.95
SC Sagamihara	(Japan)	1 February 2018	31 January 2019	32	12	6	14	37.50
Singapore	(Singapore)	25 April 2022	29 January 2024	21	8	5	8	38.10
Thailand U23	(Thailand)	4 September 2024	27 June 2025	5	0	0	5	0.00
Career Total				172	53	53	66	30.81
