= 2000 AFC Asian Cup final =

Association football match

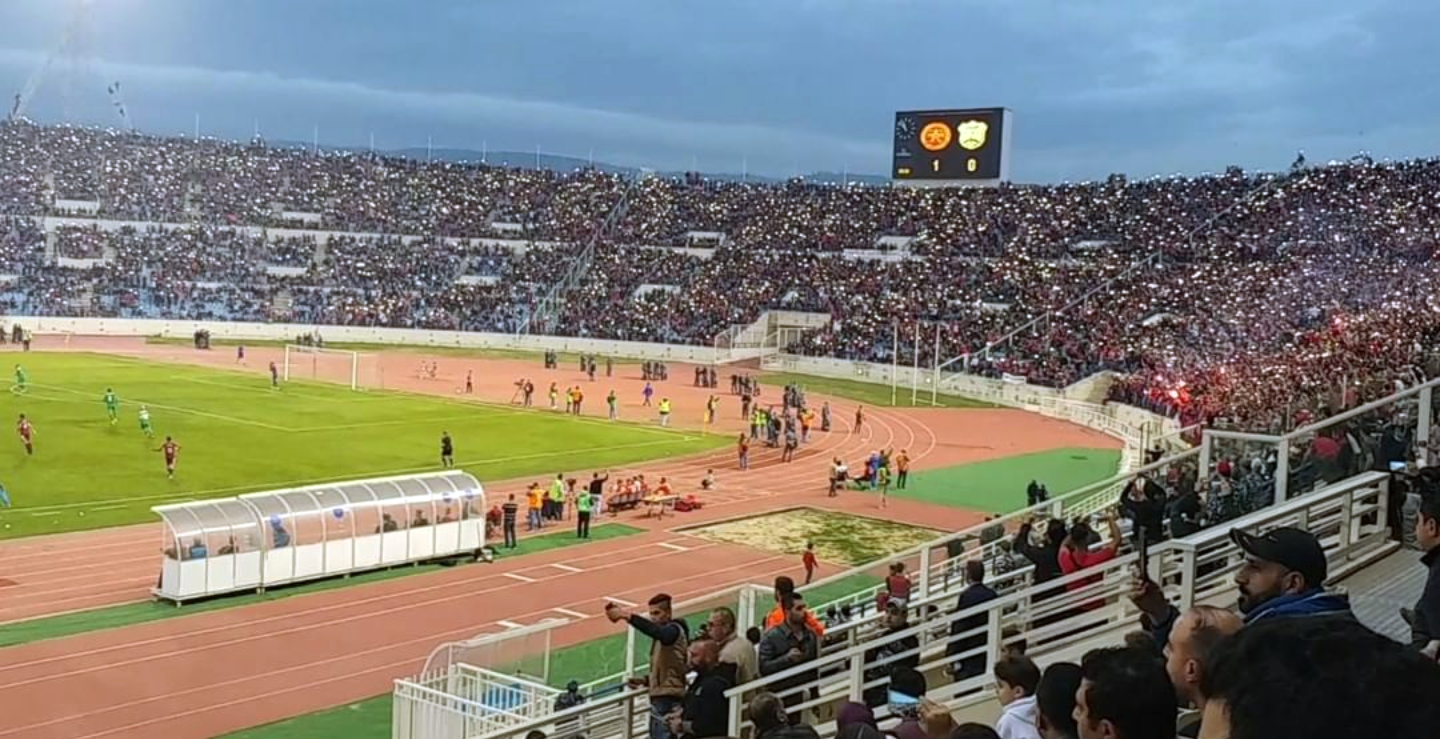
- The Camille Chamoun Sports City Stadium (pictured in 2018) hosted the final
- Event: 2000 AFC Asian Cup
Japan	Saudi Arabia
(Japan)	(Saudi Arabia)
1	0
- Date: 20 October 2000
- Venue: Camille Chamoun Sports City Stadium, Beirut
- Man of the Match: Yoshikatsu Kawaguchi (Japan)
- Referee: Ali Bujsaim (United Arab Emirates)
- Attendance: 49,500
- Weather: Partly cloudy 21 °C (70 °F); 68% humidity

The 2000 AFC Asian Cup final was a football match which determined the winner of the 2000 AFC Asian Cup, the 12th edition of the AFC Asian Cup, a quadrennial tournament contested by the men's national teams of the member associations of the Asian Football Confederation. The match was held at the Camille Chamoun Sports City Stadium in Beirut, Lebanon, on 20 October 2000 and was contested by Japan and Saudi Arabia.

Japan had won its only previous appearance in an AFC Asian Cup final, when they hosted the 1992 tournament, while Saudi Arabia were playing their fifth consecutive, and in total. The 2000 final was set up to be a repeat of the 1992 final, in which Japan beat Saudi Arabia 1–0. Indeed, 1–0 would also be the scoreline of the 2000 final: after Saudi Arabia's Hamzah Falatah missed a penalty, Japan scored in the first half thanks to a Shigeyoshi Mochizuki goal in the first half. Yoshikatsu Kawaguchi's numerous saves, which denied Saudi Arabia from scoring, earned him the Man of the Match award.

== Venue ==
The Camille Chamoun Sports City Stadium, located in Beirut, Lebanon, hosted the 2000 AFC Asian Cup Final. The 49,500-seat stadium was built in 1957, and is primarily used by the Lebanon national football team. It was the main stadium used to host the 2000 Asian Cup; six matches were played in the stadium including the opening match and the final.

== Route to the final ==
Japan
Round
Saudi Arabia
Opponents
Result
Group stage
Opponents
Result
Saudi Arabia
4–1
Match 1
Japan
1–4
Uzbekistan
8–1
Match 2
Qatar
0–0
Qatar
1–1
Match 3
Uzbekistan
5–0
Group C winners

Pos	Team	Pld	Pts
1	Japan	3	7
2	Saudi Arabia	3	4
3	Qatar	3	3
4	Uzbekistan	3	1

Source: RSSSF
Final standings
Group C runners-up

Pos	Team	Pld	Pts
1	Japan	3	7
2	Saudi Arabia	3	4
3	Qatar	3	3
4	Uzbekistan	3	1

Source: RSSSF
Opponents
Result
Knockout stage
Opponents
Result
Iraq
4–1
Quarter-finals
Kuwait
3–2 (a.e.t.)
China
3–2
Semi-finals
South Korea
2–1

== Match ==
=== Summary ===
The match kicked off at 16:00 local time in Beirut at the Camille Chamoun Sports City Stadium, in front of an announced attendance of 49,500 spectators. In the 10th minute of play, Japanese midfielder Shigeyoshi Mochizuki fouled opposing midfielder Talal Al-Meshal in the box; however, Saudi Arabian striker Hamzah Idris missed the subsequent penalty. The Japanese side came close to scoring twice, with two attacking opportunities by striker Naohiro Takahara, before Mochizuki scored from close range after a free kick by Shunsuke Nakamura from the left. In the 42nd minute Japan had an opportunity to double the lead after Nakamura hit the crossbar.

In the second half of the game, Saudi Arabia responded with their own attacking play, moving the momentum in their favour. Substitute Mohammad Al-Shalhoub and midfielder Nawaf Al-Temyat both missed from long range, before Al-Shalhoub forced Japanese goalkeeper Yoshikatsu Kawaguchi to produce a "spectacular" save in the 59th minute. Five minutes later, Kawaguchi saved a header from Al-Meshal. Japan's attacking occasions in the second half came from counterattacks.

Japanese striker Atsushi Yanagisawa was subbed on in the 80th minute, before being subbed off only seven minutes later; Philippe Troussier, Japan's manager, stated: "[Yanagisawa] didn't do what I asked him to". Noted as the "best save of the match", in the 87th minute Kawaguchi dove to his right to save a 25-meter shot by Nawaf Al-Temyat. The match ended 1–0 to Japan and Kawaguchi was awarded the Man of the Match award.

=== Details ===
29 October 2000
16:00 UTC+3

Japan	1–0	Saudi Arabia
Mochizuki 30'	Report

Sports City Stadium, Beirut
Attendance: 49,500
Referee: Ali Bujsaim (United Arab Emirates)

Japan	Saudi Arabia

GK	1	Yoshikatsu Kawaguchi
CB	3	Naoki Matsuda
CB	4	Ryuzo Morioka (c)	(yellow card) 54'
CB	6	Toshihiro Hattori
RM	8	Shigeyoshi Mochizuki	(yellow card) 10'
CM	24	Tomokazu Myojin
CM	10	Hiroshi Nanami
LM	12	Hiroaki Morishima		(substituted off) 89'
AM	14	Shunsuke Nakamura
CF	29	Naohiro Takahara	(yellow card) 76'	(substituted off) 80'
CF	9	Akinori Nishizawa
Substitutions:
FW	13	Atsushi Yanagisawa		(substituted on) 80'	(substituted off) 88'
MF	15	Daisuke Oku	(yellow card) 90'		(substituted on) 88'
MF	30	Shinji Ono		(substituted on) 89'
Manager:
(France) Philippe Troussier

GK	1	Mohamed Al-Deayea
CB	3	Mohammed Al-Khilaiwi
CB	12	Ahmed Dokhi	(yellow card) 29'
CB	13	Saleh Al-Saqri
RWB	16	Fouzi Al-Shehri		(substituted off) 72'
LWB	23	Ahmed Khalil Al-Dosari (c)
RM	19	Hamzah Idris		(substituted off) 46'
CM	17	Abdullah Al-Waked
LM	29	Talal Al-Meshal
AM	18	Nawaf Al-Temyat
CF	9	Sami Al-Jaber
Substitutions:
MF	20	Mohammad Al-Shalhoub		(substituted on) 46'
MF	14	Marzouk Al-Otaibi		(substituted on) 72'
Manager:
(Czech Republic) Milan Máčala

Man of the Match:
Yoshikatsu Kawaguchi (Japan)
