= List of Asian Club Championship and AFC Champions League Elite finals =

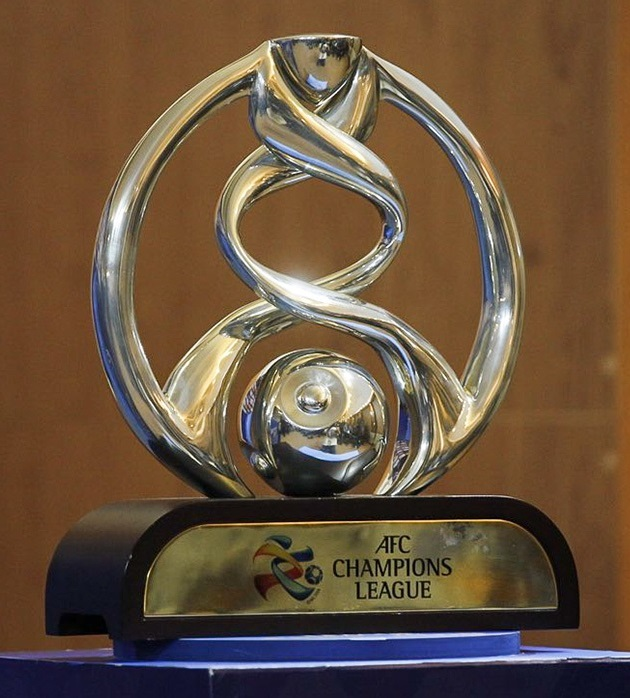
- AFC Champions League trophy, used until 2024
- Founded: 1967
- Region: Asia (AFC)
- Teams: 32 (league stage)
- Current champions: (Saudi Arabia) Al-Ahli (2nd title)
- Most championships: (Saudi Arabia) Al-Hilal (4 titles)
- 2025–26 AFC Champions League Elite

The AFC Champions League Elite is a seasonal football competition established in 1967. It is open to the league champions and cup winners of Asian Football Confederation member associations, as well as to the clubs finishing in second and third position in the stronger leagues of each zone. Prior to the 2002–03 season, the tournament was named the Asian Club Championship. Originally, only the champions of their respective national league and the defending champion of the competition were allowed to participate. However, this was changed in 2002 to allow the national cup winners to compete as well. In 2024, the competition rebranded again, and was renamed as the AFC Champions League Elite.

Al-Hilal hold the record for the most victories, with four wins since the competition's inception. Thai Farmers Bank, Pohang Steelers, Suwon Samsung Bluewings, Al-Ittihad and Al-Ahli are the five teams that have won the competition consecutively. Al-Hilal has contested the most finals, nine, winning four and losing five, while Yokohama F. Marinos, FC Seoul and Persepolis are the only three clubs to reach the finals more than once without winning. Overall, 25 clubs have won the competition since its inception in 1967. Clubs from South Korea have won the most titles with twelve, while Japanese and Saudi Arabian clubs are second with eight wins each. The current champions are Al-Ahli, who beat Machida Zelvia 1–0 in the 2026 final.

== List of finals ==
Key
#	Finals not played
‡	Ties decided on away goals
†	Matches won after extra time
*	Matches decided on penalties

- The "Year" column refers to the season the competition was held, and wikilinks to the article about that season.
- Official season orthography of Asian Club Championship is reset. Both one-year and two-year seasons listed separately.
- Finals are listed in the order they were played.

Asian Champion Club Tournament era (1967–1972)
Year	Winners	Score	Runners-up	Venue	Attendance
1967	Hapoel Tel Aviv (Israel)	2–1	(Malaysia) Selangor	Supachalasai National Stadium, Bangkok	
1969	Maccabi Tel Aviv (Israel)	1–0^{†}	(South Korea) Yangzee FC	Supachalasai National Stadium, Bangkok	
1970	Taj Tehran (Iran)	2–1	(Israel) Hapoel Tel Aviv	Amjadieh Stadium, Tehran	35,000
1971	Maccabi Tel Aviv (Israel)	w/o^{[A]}^{#}	(Iraq) Aliyat Al-Shorta	Supachalasai National Stadium, Bangkok	
1972	Cancelled				
Asian Club Championship era (1985–2002)
1985–86	Daewoo Royals (South Korea)	3–1^{†}	(Saudi Arabia) Al-Ahli	Abdullah Al Faisal Stadium, Jeddah	
1986	Furukawa Electric (Japan)	RR^{[B]}	(Saudi Arabia) Al-Hilal	N/A	
Year	Home team	Score	Away team	Venue	Attendance
1987	Al-Hilal (Saudi Arabia)	w/o	(Japan) Yomiuri FC	Faisal bin Fahd Stadium, Riyadh	N/A
1987	Yomiuri FC (Japan)	w/o	(Saudi Arabia) Al-Hilal	Ajinomoto Field Nishigaoka, Tokyo	N/A
1987	Yomiuri FC won the title.^{[C]}^{#}				
1988–89	Al-Rasheed (Iraq)	3–2	(Qatar) Al-Sadd	Al-Shaab Stadium, Baghdad	10,000
1988–89	Al-Sadd (Qatar)	1–0	(Iraq) Al-Rasheed	Jassim bin Hamad Stadium, Doha	5,000
1988–89	Al-Sadd won 3–3 on away goals.^{‡}				
1989–90	Nissan Yokohama FC (Japan)	1–2	(China) Liaoning	Mitsuzawa Stadium, Yokohama	
1989–90	Liaoning (China)	1–1	(Japan) Nissan Yokohama FC	Tiexi New District Sports Center, Shenyang	
1989–90	Liaoning won 3–2 on aggregate.				
Year	Winners	Score	Runners-up	Venue	Attendance
1990–91	Esteghlal (Iran)	2–1	(China) Liaoning	Bangabandhu National Stadium, Dhaka	
1991	Al-Hilal (Saudi Arabia)	1–1*^{[D]}	(Iran) Esteghlal	Khalifa International Stadium, Doha	
1992–93	PAS Tehran (Iran)	1–0	(Saudi Arabia) Al-Shabab	Al Ahli Stadium, Manama	
1993–94	Thai Farmers Bank (Thailand)	2–1	Oman Club	Supachalasai National Stadium, Bangkok	
1994–95	Thai Farmers Bank (Thailand)	1–0	(Qatar) Al-Arabi	Supachalasai National Stadium, Bangkok	
1995	Ilhwa Chunma (South Korea)	1–0^{†}	(Saudi Arabia) Al-Nassr	King Fahd Stadium, Riyadh	
1996–97	Pohang Steelers (South Korea)	2–1^{†}	(South Korea) Cheonan Ilhwa Chunma	Bukit Jalil National Stadium, Kuala Lumpur	
1997–98	Pohang Steelers (South Korea)	0–0*^{[E]}	(China) Dalian Wanda	Hong Kong Stadium, Hong Kong	
1998–99	Júbilo Iwata (Japan)	2–1	(Iran) Esteghlal	Azadi Stadium, Tehran	121,000
1999–2000	Al-Hilal (Saudi Arabia)	3–2^{†}	(Japan) Júbilo Iwata	King Fahd Stadium, Riyadh	40,000
2000–01	Suwon Samsung Bluewings (South Korea)	1–0	(Japan) Júbilo Iwata	Suwon World Cup Stadium, Suwon	
2001–02	Suwon Samsung Bluewings (South Korea)	0–0*^{[F]}	(South Korea) Anyang LG Cheetahs	Azadi Stadium, Tehran	
AFC Champions League era (2002–2024)
Year	Home team	Score	Away team	Venue	Attendance
2002–03	Al Ain (United Arab Emirates)	2–0	(Thailand) BEC Tero Sasana	Tahnoun Bin Mohamed Stadium, Al Ain	
2002–03	BEC Tero Sasana (Thailand)	1–0	(United Arab Emirates) Al Ain	Rajamangala Stadium, Bangkok	
2002–03	Al Ain won 2–1 on aggregate.				
2004	Al-Ittihad (Saudi Arabia)	1–3	(South Korea) Seongnam Ilhwa Chunma	Abdullah Al Faisal Stadium, Jeddah	
2004	Seongnam Ilhwa Chunma (South Korea)	0–5	(Saudi Arabia) Al-Ittihad	Seongnam Stadium, Seongnam	
2004	Al-Ittihad won 6–3 on aggregate.				
2005	Al Ain (United Arab Emirates)	1–1	(Saudi Arabia) Al-Ittihad	Tahnoun Bin Mohamed Stadium, Al Ain	
2005	Al-Ittihad (Saudi Arabia)	4–2	(United Arab Emirates) Al Ain	Abdullah Al Faisal Stadium, Jeddah	
2005	Al-Ittihad won 5–3 on aggregate.				
2006	Jeonbuk Hyundai Motors (South Korea)	2–0	(Syria) Al-Karamah	Jeonju World Cup Stadium, Jeonju	25,830
2006	Al-Karamah (Syria)	2–1	(South Korea) Jeonbuk Hyundai Motors	Khaled bin Walid Stadium, Homs	40,000
2006	Jeonbuk Hyundai Motors won 3–2 on aggregate.				
2007	Sepahan (Iran)	1–1	(Japan) Urawa Red Diamonds	Foolad Shahr Stadium, Fuladshahr	30,000
2007	Urawa Red Diamonds (Japan)	2–0	(Iran) Sepahan	Saitama Stadium 2002, Saitama	59,034
2007	Urawa Red Diamonds won 3–1 on aggregate.				
2008	Gamba Osaka (Japan)	3–0	(Australia) Adelaide United	Osaka Expo '70 Stadium, Suita, Osaka	21,000
2008	Adelaide United (Australia)	0–2	(Japan) Gamba Osaka	Hindmarsh Stadium, Adelaide	17,000
2008	Gamba Osaka won 5–0 on aggregate.				
Year	Winners	Score	Runners-up	Venue	Attendance
2009	Pohang Steelers (South Korea)	2–1	(Saudi Arabia) Al-Ittihad	National Stadium, Tokyo	25,743
2010	Seongnam Ilhwa Chunma (South Korea)	3–1	(Iran) Zob Ahan	National Stadium, Tokyo	27,308
2011	Al-Sadd (Qatar)	2–2*^{[G]}	(South Korea) Jeonbuk Hyundai Motors	Jeonju World Cup Stadium, Jeonju	41,805
2012	Ulsan Hyundai (South Korea)	3–0	(Saudi Arabia) Al-Ahli	Ulsan Munsu Football Stadium, Ulsan	42,153
Year	Home team	Score	Away team	Venue	Attendance
2013	FC Seoul (South Korea)	2–2	(China) Guangzhou Evergrande	Seoul World Cup Stadium, Seoul	55,501
2013	Guangzhou Evergrande (China)	1–1	(South Korea) FC Seoul	Tianhe Stadium, Guangzhou	55,847
2013	3–3 on aggregate, Guangzhou Evergrande won on away goals.^{‡}				
2014	Western Sydney Wanderers (Australia)	1–0	(Saudi Arabia) Al-Hilal	Parramatta Stadium, Sydney	20,053
2014	Al-Hilal (Saudi Arabia)	0–0	(Australia) Western Sydney Wanderers	King Fahd International Stadium, Riyadh	66,225
2014	Western Sydney Wanderers won 1–0 on aggregate.				
2015	Al-Ahli (United Arab Emirates)	0–0	(China) Guangzhou Evergrande	Al-Rashid Stadium, Dubai	9,480
2015	Guangzhou Evergrande (China)	1–0	(United Arab Emirates) Al-Ahli	Tianhe Stadium, Guangzhou	42,499
2015	Guangzhou Evergrande won 1–0 on aggregate.				
2016	Jeonbuk Hyundai Motors (South Korea)	2–1	(United Arab Emirates) Al Ain	Jeonju World Cup Stadium, Jeonju	36,158
2016	Al Ain (United Arab Emirates)	1–1	(South Korea) Jeonbuk Hyundai Motors	Hazza Bin Zayed Stadium, Al Ain	23,239
2016	Jeonbuk Hyundai Motors won 3–2 on aggregate.				
2017	Al-Hilal (Saudi Arabia)	1–1	(Japan) Urawa Red Diamonds	King Fahd International Stadium, Riyadh	59,136
2017	Urawa Red Diamonds (Japan)	1–0	(Saudi Arabia) Al-Hilal	Saitama Stadium 2002, Saitama	57,727
2017	Urawa Red Diamonds won 2–1 on aggregate.				
2018	Kashima Antlers (Japan)	2–0	(Iran) Persepolis	Kashima Soccer Stadium, Kashima	35,022
2018	Persepolis (Iran)	0–0	(Japan) Kashima Antlers	Azadi Stadium, Tehran	100,000
2018	Kashima Antlers won 2–0 on aggregate.				
2019	Al-Hilal (Saudi Arabia)	1–0	(Japan) Urawa Red Diamonds	King Saud University Stadium, Riyadh	22,549
2019	Urawa Red Diamonds (Japan)	0–2	(Saudi Arabia) Al-Hilal	Saitama Stadium 2002, Saitama	58,109
2019	Al-Hilal won 3–0 on aggregate.				
Year	Winners	Score	Runners-up	Venue	Attendance
2020	Ulsan Hyundai (South Korea)	2–1	(Iran) Persepolis	Al Janoub Stadium, Al Wakrah	8,517
2021	Al-Hilal (Saudi Arabia)	2–0	(South Korea) Pohang Steelers	King Fahd International Stadium, Riyadh	50,171
Year	Home team	Score	Away team	Venue	Attendance
2022	Al-Hilal (Saudi Arabia)	1–1	(Japan) Urawa Red Diamonds	King Fahd International Stadium, Riyadh	50,881
2022	Urawa Red Diamonds (Japan)	1–0	(Saudi Arabia) Al-Hilal	Saitama Stadium 2002, Saitama	53,574
2022	Urawa Red Diamonds won 2–1 on aggregate.				
2023–24	Yokohama F. Marinos (Japan)	2–1	(United Arab Emirates) Al Ain	Nissan Stadium, Yokohama	53,704
2023–24	Al Ain (United Arab Emirates)	5–1	(Japan) Yokohama F. Marinos	Hazza bin Zayed Stadium, Al Ain	24,826
2023–24	Al Ain won 6–3 on aggregate.				
AFC Champions League Elite era (2024–present)
Year	Winners	Score	Runners-up	Venue	Attendance
2024–25	Al-Ahli (Saudi Arabia)	2–0	(Japan) Kawasaki Frontale	King Abdullah Sports City, Jeddah	58,281
2025–26	Al-Ahli (Saudi Arabia)	1–0^{†}	(Japan) Machida Zelvia	King Abdullah Sports City, Jeddah	58,984

== Performances ==
=== By club ===
Performances in the Asian Club Championship and AFC Champions League Elite by club
Club	Title(s)	Runners-up	Seasons won	Seasons runner-up
(Saudi Arabia) Al-Hilal	4	5	1991, 1999–2000, 2019, 2021	1986, 1987, 2014, 2017, 2022
(South Korea) Pohang Steelers	3	1	1996–97, 1997–98, 2009	2021
(Japan) Urawa Red Diamonds	3	1	2007, 2017, 2022	2019
(Iran) Esteghlal	2	2	1970, 1990–91	1991, 1998–99
(South Korea) Seongnam FC	2	2	1995, 2010	1996–97, 2004
(United Arab Emirates) Al Ain	2	2	2002–03, 2023–24	2005, 2016
(Saudi Arabia) Al-Ahli	2	2	2024–25, 2025–26	1985–86, 2012
(Saudi Arabia) Al-Ittihad	2	1	2004, 2005	2009
(South Korea) Jeonbuk Hyundai Motors	2	1	2006, 2016	2011
(Israel) Maccabi Tel Aviv	2	0	1969, 1971	—
(Qatar) Al-Sadd	2	0	1988–89, 2011	—
(Thailand) Thai Farmers Bank	2	0	1993–94, 1994–95	—
(South Korea) Suwon Samsung Bluewings	2	0	2000–01, 2001–02	—
(South Korea) Ulsan HD	2	0	2012, 2020	—
(China) Guangzhou	2	0	2013, 2015	—
(Japan) Júbilo Iwata	1	2	1998–99	1999–2000, 2000–01
(Israel) Hapoel Tel Aviv	1	1	1967	1970
(China) Liaoning	1	1	1989–90	1990–91
(South Korea) Busan IPark	1	0	1985–86	—
(Japan) JEF United Chiba	1	0	1986	—
(Japan) Tokyo Verdy	1	0	1987	—
(Iran) PAS Tehran	1	0	1992–93	—
(Japan) Gamba Osaka	1	0	2008	—
(Australia) Western Sydney Wanderers	1	0	2014	—
(Japan) Kashima Antlers	1	0	2018	—
(Japan) Yokohama F. Marinos	0	2	—	1989–90, 2023–24
(South Korea) FC Seoul	0	2	—	2001–02, 2013
(Iran) Persepolis	0	2	—	2018, 2020
(Malaysia) Selangor	0	1	—	1967
(South Korea) Yangzee	0	1	—	1969
(Iraq) Aliyat Al-Shorta	0	1	—	1971
(Iraq) Al-Rasheed	0	1	—	1988–89
(Saudi Arabia) Al-Shabab	0	1	—	1992–93
Oman Club	0	1	—	1993–94
(Qatar) Al-Arabi	0	1	—	1994–95
(Saudi Arabia) Al-Nassr	0	1	—	1995
(China) Dalian Shide	0	1	—	1997–98
(Thailand) Police Tero	0	1	—	2002–03
(Syria) Al-Karamah	0	1	—	2006
(Iran) Sepahan	0	1	—	2007
(Australia) Adelaide United	0	1	—	2008
(Iran) Zob Ahan	0	1	—	2010
(United Arab Emirates) Shabab Al-Ahli	0	1	—	2015
(Japan) Kawasaki Frontale	0	1	—	2024–25
(Japan) Machida Zelvia	0	1	—	2025–26

=== By nation ===
Performances in finals by nation
Nation	Titles	Runners-up	Total
South Korea	12	7	19
Saudi Arabia	8	10	18
Japan	8	7	15
Iran	3	6	9
China	3	2	5
Israel	3	1	4
United Arab Emirates	2	3	5
Qatar	2	1	3
Thailand	2	1	3
Australia	1	1	2
Iraq	0	2	2
Malaysia	0	1	1
Oman	0	1	1
Syria	0	1	1

== See also ==
- List of Asian Club Championship and AFC Champions League Elite winning managers
- List of Asian Cup Winner's Cup finals

== Notes ==
A. The final was scratched and Maccabi Tel Aviv were awarded the championship after Aliyat Al-Shorta refused to play the Israeli side for political reasons.

B. The championship was decided in a final group round-robin of four teams.

C. The final was scratched and Yomiuri FC were awarded the championship as Al-Hilal was unable to field a team after several of their starting players were selected for the Saudi national team's preparation camp, which clashed with the first leg.

D. Score was 1–1 after 90 minutes and extra time. Al-Hilal won the penalty-shootout 4–3.

E. Score was 0–0 after 90 minutes and extra time. Pohang Steelers won the penalty-shootout 6–5.

F. Score was 0–0 after 90 minutes and extra time. Suwon Samsung Bluewings won the penalty-shootout 4–2.

G. Score was 2–2 after 90 minutes and extra time. Al-Sadd won the penalty-shootout 4–2.
