= Shigeyoshi Mochizuki =

Japanese footballer and manager

Shigeyoshi Mochizuki 望月 重良
Personal information
- Full name: Shigeyoshi Mochizuki
- Date of birth: 9 July 1973 (age 53)
- Place of birth: Shizuoka, Japan
- Height: 1.76 m (5 ft 9 1/2 in)
- Position: Midfielder

Youth career
- 1989–1991: Shimizu Commercial High School

College career
Years	Team	Apps	(Gls)
1992–1995	University of Tsukuba		

Senior career*
Years	Team	Apps	(Gls)
1996–2000	Nagoya Grampus Eight	119	(16)
2000	Kyoto Purple Sanga	9	(0)
2001–2002	Vissel Kobe	49	(1)
2003–2004	JEF United Ichihara	7	(0)
2003	→Vegalta Sendai (loan)	14	(1)
2005–2006	Yokohama FC	2	(0)
Total		200	(18)

International career
1997–2001	Japan	15	(1)

Managerial career
- 2011: SC Sagamihara
Medal record
Nagoya Grampus Eight
Runner-up	J1 League	1996
Winner	Emperor's Cup	1999
Representing Japan
AFC Asian Cup
Gold medal – first place	2000 Lebanon
- * Club domestic league appearances and goals

Shigeyoshi Mochizuki (望月 重良, Mochizuki Shigeyoshi; born 9 July 1973) is a former Japanese football player and manager. He played for Japan national team.

== Club career ==
Mochizuki was born in Shizuoka on 9 July 1973. After graduating from the University of Tsukuba, he joined Nagoya Grampus Eight with teammate Takayuki Nishigaya in 1996. The club were runners-up in the 1996–97 Asian Cup Winners' Cup. In July 2000, he moved to Kyoto Purple Sanga with Takashi Hirano. However, the club was relegated to the J2 League, and he moved to Vissel Kobe in 2001. In 2003, he moved to JEF United Ichihara and in August, he moved to Vegalta Sendai on loan. He returned to JEF United Ichihara in 2004. However, he was diagnosed with idiopathic osteonecrosis of the femoral head (ja) in 2004. Although he went on to play for J2 League club Yokohama FC (2005–06), he made two appearances and retired in August 2006.

== National team career ==
On 15 June 1997, Mochizuki debuted for the Japan national team against Turkey. He played at the 1999 Copa América and at the 2000 Asian Cup. At the Asian Cup, he played in 4 games and scored the winning goal in the 2000 AFC Asian Cup Final against Saudi Arabia. Earlier in the match, he had fouled Talal Al-Meshal resulting in a penalty being given to the Saudis, but Hamzah Idris missed from the spot. Overall, he played 15 games for the national team.

== After retirement ==
After retirement, in February 2008, Mochizuki founded football club SC Sagamihara and became a chairman of the club. In 2011, he also served as manager from June to September.

== Career statistics ==
=== Club ===
Appearances and goals by club, season and competition
Club	Season	League			Emperor's Cup		J.League Cup		Total	
Club	Season	Division	Apps	Goals	Apps	Goals	Apps	Goals	Apps	Goals
Nagoya Grampus Eight	1996	J1 League	26	5	1	0	11	0	38	5
Nagoya Grampus Eight	1997	J1 League	17	3	1	1	10	3	28	7
Nagoya Grampus Eight	1998	J1 League	34	2	4	0	4	2	42	4
Nagoya Grampus Eight	1999	J1 League	29	6	5	1	6	1	40	8
Nagoya Grampus Eight	2000	J1 League	13	0	0	0	0	0	13	0
Kyoto Purple Sanga	2000	J1 League	9	0	1	0	2	0	12	0
Vissel Kobe	2001	J1 League	24	0	2	1	4	0	30	1
Vissel Kobe	2002	J1 League	25	1	1	0	6	0	32	1
JEF United Ichihara	2003	J1 League	7	0	0	0	3	0	10	0
Vegalta Sendai	2003	J1 League	14	1	0	0	0	0	14	1
JEF United Ichihara	2004	J1 League	0	0	0	0	0	0	0	0
Yokohama FC	2005	J2 League	2	0	0	0	—		2	0
Yokohama FC	2006	J2 League	0	0	0	0	—		0	0
Career total			200	18	15	3	46	6	261	27

=== International ===
Japan national team
Year	Apps	Goals
1997	2	0
1998	1	0
1999	2	0
2000	9	1
2001	1	0
Total	15	1

Scores and results list Japan's goal tally first, score column indicates score after each Mochizuki goal.

List of international goals scored by Shigeyoshi Mochizuki
No.	Date	Venue	Opponent	Score	Result	Competition
1	29 October 2000	Camille Chamoun Sports City Stadium, Beirut, Lebanon	Saudi Arabia	1–0	1–0	2000 AFC Asian Cup

== National team ==
- 2000 Asian Cup (Champions)

== Honors ==
Nagoya Grampus Eight

- Emperor's Cup : 1999

Japan National Team

- AFC Asian Cup : 2000
