= King Fahd Sports City Stadium =

Multi-purpose sports venue in Riyadh, Saudi Arabia

Coordinates: 24°47′18″N 46°50′21″E

- Pearl of the stadiums
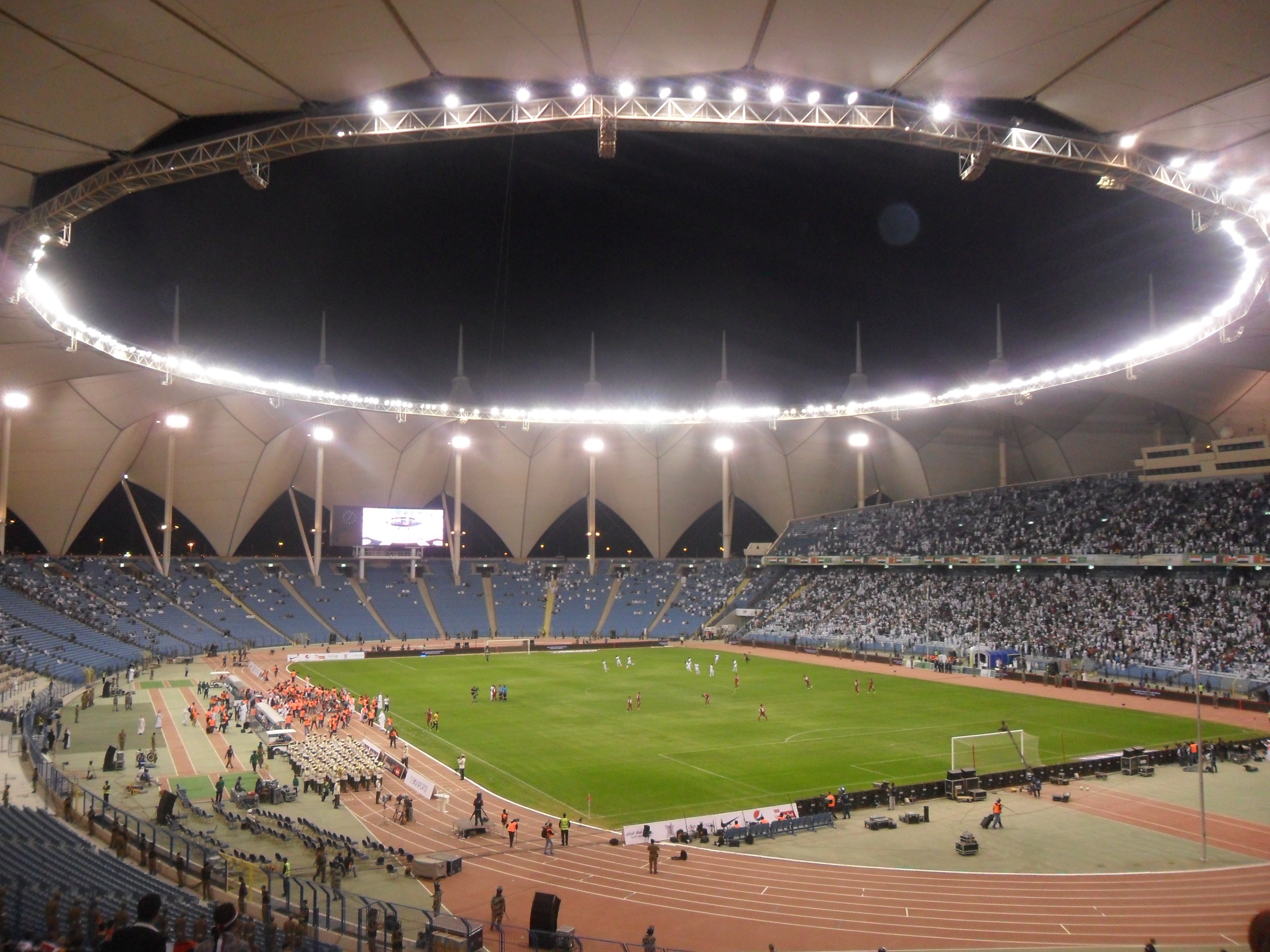
- Interactive map of King Fahd Sports City Stadium
- Former names: King Fahd International Stadium (1982–2023)
- Location: Riyadh, Saudi Arabia
- Owner: Ministry of Sport
- Operator: Ministry of Sport
- Capacity: 58,398 (to be expanded to 70,200)
- Surface: Hybrid grass
- Record attendance: 67,000 (Al-Hilal vs Al-Ahli, 16 February 2000) Saudi Founder's Cup
- Field size: Field of play: 105m × 68m Pitch area: 125m × 85m
- Public transit: 2 King Fahd Sports City Station

Construction
- Groundbreaking: 1982; 44 years ago
- Opened: 1987; 39 years ago
- Renovated: 2023; 3 years ago
- Closed: 2023; 3 years ago
- Cost: 1.72 billion
- Architects: Ian Fraser, John Roberts, Michael K.C. Cheah and Partners

Tenants
- Al-Hilal (1987–2018, 2020–2023); Al-Shabab (1987–2023); Al-Nassr (1987–2020); Saudi Arabia national football team: Major sporting events hosted; 2027 AFC Asian Cup (planned) 2034 FIFA World Cup (planned)

The King Fahd Sports City Stadium (Arabic: ملعب مدينة الملك فهد الرياضية) is a multi-purpose stadium and the main stadium of the sports city in Riyadh, Saudi Arabia. The stadium is currently closed for reconstruction, which will expand its capacity to approximately 70,200 seats by late 2026.

== Overview ==
The stadium was built in 1982 and opened in 1987, with Majed Abdullah scoring the first goal there. It hosted matches of the 1989 FIFA World Youth Championship, including the final.

In September 2017, as part of Saudi Vision 2030, there was a celebration of the 87th anniversary of the foundation of Saudi Arabia with concerts and performances. For the first time, women were allowed into the stadium.

The stadium has been included in the FIFA series of video games since the 2013 edition, when the Saudi Pro League began featuring in the game, while a modified version with two tiers all around was featured in the Pro Evolution Soccer series during the PlayStation 2 era under the name "Nakhon Ratchasima", due to its resemblance (or lack thereof) to the 80th Birthday Stadium that hosted the 2007 SEA Games in the homonymous city in Thailand.

The cost of construction was about 1.912 billion Saudi riyals or $510 million. The stadium's roof covers an area of 47,000 square feet and held up by 24 columns arranged in a 247-metre diameter circle, creating an umbrella effect that shades spectators from the hot desert sun. A special pavilion for members of the royal family is also included.

== Events ==
The stadium's first major musical event was holding a concert by BTS, which was their first concert in the Middle East, as part of their Love Yourself: Speak Yourself World Tour on 11 October 2019. This made the band the first international act to perform in the stadium. They played to an audience of 31,899 people.

The stadium hosted WWE's event Crown Jewel on 31 October 2019.

The stadium also hosted all the three matches of the 2022 Supercopa de España, which was won by Real Madrid. The semi-final between Barcelona and Real Madrid was the first official Clásico to be held in a stadium outside of Spain.

On 28 October 2022, David Guetta performed during the opening ceremony of Saudi Games 2022.

On 15 January 2023, the 2023 Supercopa de España final was hosted in the stadium with Barcelona winning the cup. Three days later, the stadium hosted the 2022 Supercoppa Italiana between AC Milan and Inter Milan.

== 2027 AFC Asian Cup ==
The King Fahd Sports City Stadium will host eight matches of the 2027 AFC Asian Cup, including the opening match and the final.

Date	Time	Team No. 1	Result	Team No. 2	Round	Attendance
7 January 2027	20:00	Saudi Arabia	–	Palestine	Group A	
9 January 2027	19:30	Syria	–	Kyrgyzstan	Group C	
12 January 2027	19:30	Oman	–	Saudi Arabia	Group A	
15 January 2027	19:30	Yemen	–	United Arab Emirates	Group E	
18 January 2027	16:30	Iran	–	Syria	Group C	
24 January 2027	15:30	Winner Group F	–	Runner-up Group E	Round of 16	
29 January 2027	15:30	Winner Match 44	–	Winner Match 43	Quarter-finals	
5 February 2027	20:00	Winner Match 49	–	Winner Match 50	Final	

== See also ==
- List of things named after Saudi kings
- List of football stadiums in Saudi Arabia

Preceded by None	King Fahd Cup; Final venue 1992, 1995	Succeeded by Itself (as FIFA Confederations Cup final venue)
Preceded by Suphachalasai Stadium; Bangkok	Asian Club Championship; Final venue 1995	Succeeded by Stadium Merdeka; Kuala Lumpur
Preceded by Itself (as King Fahd Cup final venue)	FIFA Confederations Cup; Final venue 1997	Succeeded by Estadio Azteca; Mexico City
Preceded by Azadi Stadium; Tehran	Asian Club Championship; Final venue 2000	Succeeded by Suwon Sports Complex; Suwon
Preceded by Lusail Stadium; Lusail	AFC Asian Cup; Final venue 2027	Succeeded by TBD; TBD
